= 2000 New Zealand rugby league season =

Seasons
- 1999 2001

The 2000 New Zealand rugby league season was the 93rd season of rugby league that had been played in New Zealand. The main feature of the year was the inaugural season of the Bartercard Cup competition that was run by the New Zealand Rugby League. The Canterbury Bulls won the Cup by defeating the Otahuhu Leopards 38–24 in the Grand Final.

== International competitions ==
The New Zealand national rugby league team did not play any test matches in New Zealand in 2000, losing the ANZAC Test 0–52 in Sydney and then heading to Europe in October for the 2000 World Cup. They lost to Australia 12–40 in the final of the World Cup. Coached by Frank Endacott New Zealands World Cup squad included; captain Richie Barnett, Richie Blackmore, Tonie Carroll, Nathan Cayless, Brian Jellick, Stacey Jones, Stephen Kearney, Ali Lauitiiti, Tasesa Lavea, Henry and Robbie Paul, Quentin Pongia, Tony Puletua, Matt Rua, Richard Swain, Logan Swann, Willie Talau, David Vaealiki, Joe and Nigel Vagana, Lesley Vainikolo and Ruben Wiki. Craig Smith, Jason Lowrie, David Kidwell and Tyran Smith all played in the ANZAC Test but did not make the World Cup squad.

The New Zealand Māori side also participated in the World Cup, losing to Samoa and Ireland but defeating Scotland. Earlier in the year they had participated in a three match series against Fiji, defeating them 3–0. New Zealand Māori were coached by Cameron Bell and included Billy Weepu, Hare Te Rangi, Steve Berryman, Boycie Nelson, Solomon Kiri and Doc Murray. The World Cup squad was captained by Tawera Nikau and included Alex Chan, Jamie Cookthcote, Luke Goodwin, Terry Hermansson, Sean Hoppe, David Kidwell, Toa Kohe-Love, Wairangi Koopu, Kylie Leuluai, Odell Manuel, Martin Moana, Jared Mills, Chris Nahi, Boycie Nelson, Gene Ngamu, Henry Perenara, Paul Rauhihi, Tahi Reihana, Jeremy Smith, Tyran Smith, Clinton Toopi, Paul Whatuira and Hare Te Rangi.

The New Zealand Residents toured Australia twice, conducting a three match tour in July and then returning to play Australia in October. The Residents defeated Victoria 64-0 and Dubbo Combined 82-10 before losing to Sydney Metropolitan 24–22. The Residents were coached by Gerard Stokes and included players such as; Lusi Sione, Motu Tony, captain Esau Mann, Paul and David Fisiiahi, Boycie Nelson, George Tuakura, Hare Te Rangi, Phillip Leuluai, Ben Lythe, Peter Lewis, Solomon Kiri, Jonathan Smith, Anthony Seu Seu and Shane Beyers. Aaron Whittaker was the team trainer. The Residents teams were selected by Stokes, John Ackland and Dominic Clarke.

The Residents then returned to play Australia in Gosford in October. The Residents had a weakened team, as World Cup sides such as Cook Islands, Western Samoa and Tonga had first call on players. In front of 16,200 fans Australia won 108–0.

Auckland played a home and away series with the Cook Islands in October. The series replaced a planned two-match tour of Fiji in June which was cancelled following the coup d'état. Dominic Clark coached the Auckland team.

The Kiwi Ferns competed in the first Women's World Cup, winning the tournament by defeating Great Britain 26–4 in the final.

== National competitions ==
=== Rugby League Cup ===
Taranaki defended the Rugby League Cup by defeating Northland 28–22 on 3 September.

=== Bartercard Cup ===
The 2000 Bartercard Cup was the inaugural season of the Bartercard Cup competition run by the New Zealand Rugby League. The competition was the first large scale attempt to replace the Lion Red Cup and involved eight Auckland Rugby League clubs and four regional teams. Eventual winners Canterbury were the only full provincial side in the competition. Waikato were the surprise omission.

==== The teams ====
- Hibiscus Coast were coached by Brian McClennan and Tony Benson and included Aaron Heremaia, Scott Coxon and Anthony Seuseu.
- Northcote were coached by Marty Rudolph and included Tony Tuimavave, Jamie Cook and Keneti Asiata.
- Glenora, led by player-coach Duane Mann, included captain Steve Buckingham, Aaron Tucker, Wairangi Koopu and Gavin Bailey.
- The Mt Albert Lions were coached by John Ackland and included Paul Staladi, Carl Doherty, Awen Guttenbeil, Ben Lythe and Peter Lewis.
- Marist Richmond included Motu Tony, Jason Williams, Francis Meli and Lee Finnerty.
- The Eastern Tornadoes included David and Paul Fisiiahi and Phillip Leuluai and were coached by James Leuluai.
- Otahuhu, who also drew from Manukau and Mangere East, were led by player-coach Dean Clark in his first year as a senior grade coach. The team included George Carmont, Clinton Toopi, Hare Te Rangi, captain Esau Mann, Solomon Kiri, Boycie Nelson, Jonathan Smith and George Tuakura.
- The Manurewa Marlins included Channerith and Channerath Ly.
- The Ngongotaha Chiefs included Doc Murray and Andrew Leota.
- The Porirua Pumas were coached by Mike Kuiti and included Phil Bergman.
- The Wainuiomata Lions included Billy Weepu, Paul Whatuira, Steve Berryman and David Faiumu.
- The Canterbury Bulls were coached by Gerard Stokes and included Lusi Sione, Scott Nixon, Tangia Tongiia, Robert Henare, captain Maurice Emslie and Shane Beyers.

==== Season standings ====
Team	Pld	W	D	L	PF	PA	PD	Pts
Otahuhu Leopards	22	18	0	4	782	440	342	36
Canterbury Bulls	22	15	0	7	658	525	133	30
Eastern Tornadoes	22	15	0	7	584	516	68	30
Wainuiomata Lions	22	13	0	9	668	542	126	26
Glenora Bears	22	13	0	9	608	519	89	26
Mt Albert Lions	22	12	1	9	593	584	9	25
Manurewa Marlins	22	11	2	9	633	521	112	24
Hibiscus Coast Raiders	22	7	5	10	544	578	-34	19
Marist Richmond Brothers	22	9	0	13	558	707	-149	18
Northcote Tigers	22	7	1	14	490	654	-164	15
Ngongotaha Chiefs	22	4	0	18	424	685	-261	8
Porirua Pumas	22	3	1	18	506	777	-271	7

==== The playoffs ====
This was the only year in the eight years of the competition that two sides from outside of Auckland made the playoffs. The two teams, the Canterbury Bulls and the Wainuiomata Lions, met in the Preliminary Final with Canterbury prevailing 36–6.

Qualifying and elimination finals
2	Canterbury Bulls	38
3	Eastern Tornadoes	25
4	Wainuiomata Lions	18
5	Glenora Bears	10

Semi-finals
1	Otahuhu Leopards	51
Canterbury Bulls	28
Eastern Tornadoes	20
Wainuiomata Lions	25

Preliminary final
Canterbury Bulls	36
Wainuiomata Lions	6

Grand final
Otahuhu Leopards	24
Canterbury Bulls	38

Match	Winner		Loser
Elimination Play-off	Wainuiomata Lions	18	Glenora Bears	10
Preliminary Semifinal	Canterbury Bulls	38	Eastern Tornadoes	25
Elimination Semifinal	Wainuiomata Lions	25	Eastern Tornadoes	20
Qualification Semifinal	Otahuhu Leopards	51	Canterbury Bulls	28
Preliminary Final	Canterbury Bulls	36	Wainuiomata Lions	6

==== Grand final ====
Otahuhu	Position	Canterbury
Corey Palmer	FB	Lusi Sione
George Carmont	WG	Scott Woodgate
Chris Magele	CE	Gafa Tuiloma
Scott Niwa	CE	Raymond Hubbard
Mark Elder	WG	Gareth Cook
Shane Edwards	FE	Scott Nixon
Hare Te Rangi	HB	Maurice Elmslie (C)
George Tuakura	PR	Kevin Te Hau
Esau Mann (C)	HK	Shane Beyers
Haemish Reid	PR	Craig Barrow
Herman Lemafa	SR	Shaun Norton
Tyson Majoribanks	SR	Graeme Emslie
Chris Peau	LK	Jonny Limmer
Lance Kouka	Bench	Clayton Harris
Solomon Kiri	Bench	Malafa Pua'avase
Eric Pele	Bench	Robert Henare
Tusa Lafaele	Bench	Enoka Mamoe
Dean Clark	Coach	Gerard Stokes

Canterbury won $50,000 prize money, with Otahuhu receiving $30,000. The curtain raiser was between New Zealand Students and Great Britain Students.

Team	Halftime	Total
Canterbury Bulls	20	38
Otahuhu Leopards	8	24

==== Awards ====
- Captain of the Year: Esau Mann (Otahuhu)
- Best and Fairest: George Tuakura (Otahuhu)
- Referee of the Year: Bill Shrimpton
- Most Points: Carl Doherty (215; Mt Albert)
- Most Tries: Hare Te Rangi (Otahuhu) and Remus Gentles (Eastern)
- Most Field Goals: Mark Murray (Eastern)

=== North Island Second Division ===
An Auckland side consisting of Fox Memorial players dominated the North Island Second Division competition, winning all six matches. The team was coached by Del Hughes and included Tevita Latu. Auckland defeated Coastline, Wellington, Manawatu, Taranaki, Northland and Waikato.

=== Mainland Super 10 ===
A Mainland Super 10 competition was held between Canterbury Rugby League clubs and the South Island provincial teams. The teams involved included the Tasman Orcas (featuring coach Paul Bergman and player Phil Bergman), Otago Storm, the West Coast Chargers and from Canterbury: the Haswell Hornets (who included Mike Dorreen, Glenn Coughlan and Aaron Whittaker), Hornby Panthers (including Corey Lawrie), Eastern Sea Eagles, Papanui Tigers, Sydenham Swans, Riccarton Knights and Linwood Kews.

Team	Pld	W	D	L	PF	PA	PD	Pts
Halswell Hornets	9	9	0	0	323	116	207	18
Eastern Sea Eagles	9	6	1	2	270	196	74	13
Tasman Orcas	9	6	0	3	292	154	138	12
Hornby Panthers	9	5	2	2	226	151	75	12
Papanui Tigers	9	6	0	3	262	196	66	12
Otago Storm	9	4	1	4	220	208	12	9
Sydenham Swans	9	2	1	6	206	338	-132	5
West Coast Chargers	9	2	0	7	170	306	-136	4
Linwood Keas	9	2	0	7	172	322	-150	4
Riccarton Knights	9	0	1	8	170	324	-154	1

Team Mainland Super 10 "dream team" was: Warren Donaldson (West Coast), Eddie Hei Hei (Papanui), Joe Fatuleai (Eastern), Clinton Fraser (Tasman), Linkoln Newson (Hornby), Phil Bergman (Tasman), Aaron Whittaker (Halswell), Danny Champion (Halswell), Leon Stone (Papanui), Vince Whare (Riccarton), Riki Ashwell (Otago), Tim Sione (Hornby), Brad Williams (Halswell).

Tasman and Hornby made the final after they defeated Easts 51-36 and Halswell 20-14 respectively. Tasman won the inaugural season's championship by defeating Hornby 20–0 in the Grand Final.

== Australian competitions ==
The Auckland Warriors competed in the National Rugby League competition. They finished 13th out of 14 teams and failed to make the playoffs.

== Club competitions ==
=== Auckland ===
The Otahuhu Leopards won the Fox Memorial, despite also fielding a Bartercard Cup side. They defeated Richmond 21–14 in the grand final. Richmond won the Rukutai Shield (minor premiership). Richmond included Tevita Latu and Daniel Vasau, who won the Best and Fairest award.

=== Wellington ===
The Wellington City Council announces that Rugby League Park will be shared by the Wellington Rugby League and the Wellington Rugby Union, following the sale of Athletic Park.

=== Canterbury ===
Halswell won the Canterbury Rugby League title.

=== Other Competitions ===
Turangawaewae won the 2000 Waikato Rugby League competition, defeating the Hamilton City Tigers.

The Waitara Bears defeated Marist 24–12 in the Taranaki Rugby League grand final.

Preceded by None	Bartercard Cup; 2000	Succeeded by 2001 Bartercard Cup
