= 2001 New Zealand rugby league season =

Seasons
- 2000 2002

The 2001 New Zealand rugby league season was the 94th season of rugby league that had been played in New Zealand. The main feature of the year was the second season of the Bartercard Cup competition that was run by the New Zealand Rugby League. The Hibiscus Coast Raiders won the Cup by defeating the Eastern Tornadoes 28–18 in the Grand Final.

== International competitions ==
The New Zealand national rugby league team played a one-off test match against France and defeated them 36–0 at Ericsson Stadium. The Kiwis then played Australia at the new Westpac Stadium in Wellington and lost 28–10. New Zealand were coached by Gary Freeman.

The French team also played three matches against regional selections; Northern Districts, Central Districts and the South Island. France won all three of these games, defeating the South Island 24–11 at Lancaster Park, Central Districts 28–26 at the Palmerston North Showgrounds and Northern Districts 40–16 in Huntly. Jeff Whittaker coached the South Island team that featured mainly Canterbury Bulls players. The team was captained by Shane Beyers and included Aaron Whittaker. Northern Districts included Lance Hohaia and Hare Te Rangi.

The Junior Kiwis included Vince Mellars, Richard Utai and Robert Tanielu.

Auckland conducted a two match trip to Sydney in September 2001. Auckland defeated Northern Māori 48-6 before losing to Sydney Metropolitan 34–12. They were coached by Stan Martin and included Daniel Floyd, Karl Te Mata, Tyrone Pau, Jeremy Smith, Joe Galuvao, Jason Temu, Hare Te Rangi and Cliff Beverley.

== National competitions ==
=== Rugby League Cup ===
Tasman defeated Coastline in Tauranga to win the Rugby League Cup.

=== Bartercard Cup ===
The 2001 Bartercard Cup was the second season of the Bartercard Cup competition run by the New Zealand Rugby League. After losing every match, the Ngongotaha Chiefs withdrew from the competition after round sixteen. All teams scheduled to play them after this were awarded two points for a bye. The Auckland teams were again dominant with only defending champions, the Canterbury Bulls, making the finals from outside of Auckland.

==== The Teams ====
- Hibiscus Coast were coached by Brian McClennan and Tony Benson and included captain Anthony Seuseu, Aaron Heremaia, Karl Te Mata, Jeremy Smith, Tyrone Pau, Iafeta Paleaaesina and Daniel Floyd.
- Northcote were coached by Del Hughes and included Aaron Tucker, Jared Trott, Jamie Cook and Keneti Asiata.
- Glenora were coached by player-coach Duane Mann and included Cliff Beverley, David and Gavin Bailey, Ben Lythe, Steve Buckingham and Shontayne Hape.
- The Marist Richmond Brothers included Motu Tony, Daniel Vasau, Matthew Tuisamoa, Vae Kololo and Jason Temu.
- Mount Albert were coached by John Ackland and included Sala and David Fa'alogo, Carl Doherty, Wayne McDade, Hutch Maiava, Fuifui Moimoi, Lee Finnerty and Andreas Bauer.
- The Otahuhu Leopards featured Jonathan Smith, Dean Clark, Boycie Nelson, Rusty Matua and George Carmont.
- The Eastern Tornadoes featured identical twins David and Paul Fisiiahi, Jeremiah Pai, Justin Murphy, Phillip Leuluai and Hare Te Rangi. They were coached by James Leuluai.
- The Manurewa Marlins included Mark Tookey, Kevin Campion, Cheyenne Motu, Lance Hohaia, Joe Galuvao, Channerith and Channerath Ly and Richard Utai.
- The Ngongotaha Chiefs were coached by Cameron Bell and included Mark Woods.
- Porirua included Robert Piva.
- Wainuiomata were coached by John Lomax and included Billy Weepu, Tony Lomax, Yogi Rogers and Vince Mellars.
- The Canterbury Bulls were coached by Ged Stokes, who was assisted by Phil Prescott. The team included Shane Beyers, Lusi Sione, Robert Henare, Scott Woodgate, Tangia Tongiia and Maurice Emslie.

==== Seasons Standings ====
Team	Pld	W	D	L	B	PF	PA	PD	Pts
Hibiscus Coast Raiders	21	16	1	4	1	742	425	317	35
Eastern Tornadoes	21	13	3	5	1	641	490	151	31
Canterbury Bulls	22	14	1	7	0	882	489	393	29
Otahuhu Leopards	22	14	1	7	0	691	528	163	29
Manurewa Marlins	22	13	1	8	0	657	513	144	27
Wainuiomata Lions	22	11	1	10	0	688	628	60	23
Northcote Tigers	21	10	1	10	1	566	508	58	23
Marist Richmond Brothers	21	8	2	11	1	675	595	80	20
Glenora Bears	22	9	0	13	0	630	675	-45	18
Mt Albert Lions	21	8	0	13	1	414	630	-216	18
Porirua Pumas	21	4	1	16	1	421	808	-387	11
Ngongotaha Chiefs	16	0	0	16	0	282	1000	-718	0

==== The Playoffs ====
Qualifying and elimination finals
2	Eastern Tornadoes	10
3	Canterbury Bulls	12
4	Otahuhu Leopards	42
5	Manurewa Marlins	43

Semi-finals
1	Hibiscus Coast	48
Canterbury Bulls	16
Eastern Tornadoes	24
Manurewa Marlins	20

Preliminary final
Canterbury Bulls	30
Eastern Tornadoes	38

Grand final
Hibiscus Coast	28
Eastern Tornadoes	18

Match	Winner		Loser
Elimination Play-off	Manurewa Marlins	43	Otahuhu Leopards	42
Preliminary Semifinal	Canterbury Bulls	12	Eastern Tornadoes	10
Elimination Semifinal	Eastern Tornadoes	24	Manurewa Marlins	20
Qualification Semifinal	Hibiscus Coast Raiders	48	Canterbury Bulls	16
Preliminary Final	Eastern Tornadoes	38	Canterbury Bulls	30

===== Grand Final =====
Team	Half-time	Total
Hibiscus Coast Raiders	12	28
Eastern Tornadoes	18	18

Jeremy Smith (Hibiscus Coast) was man of the match.

==== Awards ====
- Captain of the Year: Richard White (Hibiscus Coast)
- Best and Fairest: Daniel Floyd (Hibiscus Coast)
- Coach of the Year: Brian McClennan (Hibiscus Coast)
- Most Points: Daniel Floyd (308; Hibiscus Coast)
- Most Tries: Daniel Floyd (25; Hibiscus Coast)
- Referee of the Year: Andy Cook (Auckland)

=== North Island Super Seven Series ===
A North Island Super Seven Series was held between seven district sides in the North Island. This competition included Northland, Auckland, Waikato, Coastline-Bay of Plenty Mariners, Taranaki, Manawatu and Wellington. Taranaki and Wellington made the final after defeating Manawatu and Auckland respectively in the semi-finals. Wellington won the competition, defeating Taranaki 30–24.

The Coastline Mariners were coached by Tony Gordon and included Andrew Leota.

=== Mainland Super 10 ===
The second Mainland Super 10 competition was held between Canterbury Rugby League clubs and the South Island provincial teams. The teams involved included the Tasman Orcas (coached by Paul Bergman), Otago Raiders, Southland Rams and seven clubs from Canterbury: the Haswell Hornets, Hornby Panthers, Eastern Sea Eagles, Papanui Tigers, Riccarton Knights, Sydenham Swans and the Linwood Kews. The West Coast Chargers withdrew after the competition was moved to the first half of the season.

The Papanui Tigers were the minor premiers while defending champions Tasman finished fifth. The final was contested between the Linwood Keas and the Eastern Suburbs Sea Eagles.

== Australian competitions ==
The New Zealand Warriors competed in the National Rugby League competition. They finished 8th out of 14 teams, making the finals for the first time. In the Qualifying Final they were thrashed 56-12 by the minor premiers, the Parramatta Eels.

== Club competitions ==
=== Auckland ===
The Northcote Tigers won the Fox Memorial trophy, defeating Richmond 30–29 in the grand final. Richmond had earlier won the Rukutai Shield (minor premiership). The grand final was played at 11:50am before the Bartercard Cup grand final at Carlaw Park but still attracted 6,000 fans.

Hutch Maiava played for the Point Chevalier Pirates while Matthew Tuisamoa and Marcus Perenara played for the Richmond Bulldogs.

=== Wellington ===
Robert Piva played for the Kapati Coast Bears while Vince Mellars played for the Petone Panthers. Billy Weepu and John Lomax represented the Wainuiomata Lions.

=== Canterbury ===
Hornby won the Canterbury Rugby League title.

=== Other Competitions ===
The Hamilton City Tigers won the Waikato Rugby League minor premiership. Hukanui defeated Turangawaewae in the grand final.

The Waitara Bears defeated Marist 14–10 in the Taranaki Rugby League grand final.

Preceded by 2000 Bartercard Cup	Bartercard Cup; 2001	Succeeded by 2002 Bartercard Cup
