= 1998 New Zealand rugby league season =

Seasons
- 1997 1999

The 1998 New Zealand rugby league season was the 91st season of rugby league that had been played in New Zealand. The main feature of the year was the National Provincial competition that was run by the New Zealand Rugby League. Auckland won the National Provincial Competition by defeating Canterbury 44-8 while Waikato ended the season holding the Rugby League Cup.

== International competitions ==
The New Zealand national rugby league team played in six Test matches in 1998, defeating Australia 22–16 at North Harbour Stadium in the Anzac Test on 24 April before losing 12-30 and 16–36 in October. New Zealand were coached by Frank Endacott and included; captain Matthew Ridge, Sean Hoppe, Richard Blackmore, Ruben Wiki, Richie Barnett, Robbie Paul, Stacey Jones, John Lomax, Henry Paul, Quentin Pongia, Jarrod McCracken, Tony Iro, Logan Swann, Nigel Vagana, Terry Hermansson, Kevin Iro, Syd Eru, Stephen Kearney, Gene Ngamu, Tony Puletua, Nathan Cayless and Joe Vagana.

New Zealand then conducted a tour of Great Britain. They won the first two Test matches 22-16 and 36-16 before being held to a 23-all draw in the third and final Test match. New Zealand were coached by Frank Endacott and included; Richie Barnett, Nathan Cayless, Syd Eru, Daryl Halligan, Sean Hoppe, Kevin and Tony Iro, Stacey Jones, Stephen Kearney, Jarrod McCracken, Henry and Robbie Paul, captain Quentin Pongia, Tony Puletua, Craig Smith, Logan Swann, Joe Vagana and Ruben Wiki.

During the National Rugby League playoffs two trial matches were held, with the Auckland Warriors playing the New Zealand Residents. The Warriors won both matches, 66-4 and 60-16 respectively at Rugby League Park and Carlaw Park respectively.

A New Zealand Sevens team traveled to Fiji to compete in the Oceania Sevens. The team was coached by Gerard Stokes and included Brian Jellick and Phil Bergman. New Zealand won the tournament.

The New Zealand Māori team, excited by the news that they would participate in the 2000 World Cup, toured both the Cook Islands and Papua New Guinea. Included in the squads were Frank Watene, Brian Jellick, Dallas Mead, Boycie Nelson, Jason Williams, Chris Nahi, Phil Bergman, Kyle Leuluai, Artie Shead and Tawera Nikau. The Māori finished third in the Papua New Guinea 50th Jubilee Tournament. Earlier in the season the New Zealand Māori had traveled to the Cook Islands. Included in this squad was Hare Te Rangi, Jellick, Odell Manuel, Nelson, Paul Rauhihi, Watene and Jonathan Smith.

The Kiwi Ferns played three test matches against the Great Britain national side, winning all three tests.

The Junior Kiwis played the Junior Kangaroos home and away, losing both matches. The squad was coached by Gary Kemble and featured David Vaealiki, Lesley Vainikolo, Glen Turner, Peter Lewis, Jeremy Smith, Wairangi Koopu, Aaron Trinder, Henry Fa'afili, Ali Lauitiiti, Jason Williams and Jonathan Smith.

The Under 18 secondary schools team hosted the Australian secondary schools team and lost both matches. The team was coached by Bill Robb and included Shontayne Hape, Henry Perenara, Jason Williams, Henry Fa'afili and James Stosic. St Pauls College won the national secondary schools competition. An Under 19 Academy Team won the inaugural Oceania tournament. This team was coached by Jeff Whittaker and included James Stosic and Clinton Toopi.

Quentin Pongia was named the NZRL player of the year.

== National competitions ==
=== Rugby League Cup ===
Waikato accepted three challenges for the Rugby League Cup early in the season. They defeated Coastline 64-14 and Hawkes Bay 50-8 before facing a competitive challenge from Taranaki. Taranaki were leading 16–12 with thirteen minutes to go before Waikato scored twice to win 22–16.

Having already defended the trophy three times, Waikato did not put the Rugby League Cup on the line when they hosted Auckland in the National Provincial Competition.

=== National Provincial Competition ===
All 15 districts competed in the New Zealand Rugby League's 1998 Provincial Competition with teams playing in regional zones.

==== First Division ====
The First Division consisted of six teams divided into two regional zones. The winner of each zone met in the final.

===== Northern Zone =====
Auckland were coached by Dominic Clarke and captained by Ben Lythe. Other notable players included Cliff Beverley, Boycie Nelson, Don Stewart and Brian Jellick.

Waikato were coached by Bill Kells and featured Tama Hohaia, captain Tukere Barlow and Wairangi Koopu.

Team	Pld	W	D	L	PF	PA	Pts
Auckland	4	4	0	0	242	34	8
Waikato Cougars	4	2	0	2	93	162	4
Bay of Plenty Stags	4	0	0	4	54	193	0

===== Southern Zone =====
Alan Jackson coached the newly renamed Taranaki Sharks for the first time in 1998. Taranaki used six imports throughout the season, all from Auckland. They were Iva Ropati, Paul Rauhihi, Lamond Copestake, Phil and Artie Shead and John Edmonds. James Stosic played in the Sharks team as a 17-year-old 100 kg prop.

Canterbury were coached by Gerard Stokes and featured Aaron Whittaker, Paul Koloi, Brent Stuart, Jason Palmada, David Vaealiki, Shane Beyers, Phil Bergman.

Team	Pld	W	D	L	PF	PA	Pts
Canterbury Reds	4	3	0	1	126	90	6
Taranaki Sharks	4	2	0	2	122	104	4
Wellington Pumas	4	1	0	3	102	156	2

===== Final =====
This was Auckland's biggest win over Canterbury since 1989 when it defeated them 50–12. Ben Lythe played in the final despite getting married the day before.

Team	Halftime	Total
Auckland	18	44
Canterbury	4	8

Tries (Auckland)	1: B.Nelson, J.Fiu, C.Beverley, K.Asiata, L.Tamatoa, B.Fahey, D.Stewart
Tries (Canterbury)	1: G.Cook, L.Sione
Goals (Auckland)	8: B.Lythe
Goals (Canterbury)	0
Date	1 November
Referee	Steven Church
Venue	Carlaw Park

==== Second Division ====
Nine teams competed in the second division, in three regional zones. The winner of each of the regional zones, plus the worst performing first division side competed in an inter-zonal play off for a spot in 1999's First Division.

===== Northern Zone =====
Northland were coached by Phil Marsh and included Haemish Reid and Anthony Clyde who had previously played reserve grade for the Canterbury Bankstown Bulldogs and Auckland Warriors respectively.

Team	Pld	W	D	L	PF	PA	Pts
Northland Wild Boars	4	4	0	0	254	60	8
Coastline Mariners	4	2	0	2	172	152	4
Gisborne East Coast Lions	4	0	0	4	58	272	0

===== Central Zone =====
Manawatu were again coached by Paul Sixtus and were strengthened by several imports from Wellington. Despite this, and Hawke's Bay's Lion Red Cup experience, the Tasman Orcas, who were only formed in 1997, won the pool by defeating Manawatu in the final match.

Tasman included former Kiwi Simon Angell and were coached by Wayne McCann.

Team	Pld	W	D	L	PF	PA	Pts
Tasman Orcas	4	3	0	1	138	132	6
Manawatu Mustangs	4	2	0	2	150	128	4
Hawkes Bay Unicorns	4	1	0	3	134	162	2

===== Southern Zone =====
To celebrate the 150 years since the European settlement of Otago a combined Otago-Southland side played a New Zealand Army team and defeated them 54–6 in Dunedin. This was the first time a combined Otago-Southland team had played since 1984.

Otago defeated West Coast for the first time since 1927. Southland also recorded its first ever win over the Coast. The second West Coast v Otago match was canceled due to bad weather.

Team	Pld	W	D	L	PF	PA	Pts
Otago 45er's	3	3	0	0	106	60	6
West Coast Chargers	3	1	0	2	80	74	2
Southland Rams	4	1	0	3	76	138	2

===== Inter-Zonal playoffs =====
The Bay of Plenty were able to retain their spot in the first division by defeating Northland and Otago, both teams who were previously undefeated.

Semi-finals
Bay of Plenty Stags	48
Northland Wild Boars	32
Tasman Orcas	18
Otago 45er's	22

Final
Bay of Plenty Stags	56
Otago 45er's	10

== Australian competitions ==
The Auckland Warriors competed in the National Rugby League competition. They finished 15th out of 20 teams and failed to make the playoffs.

The Auckland Warriors reserve team played in a series of matches against New Zealand Provincial sides, winning most of them by large margins.

== Club competitions ==
=== Auckland ===
The Glenora Bears defended their Fox Memorial title and also won the Rukutai Shield (minor premiership). Glenora defeated Mangere East 35–6 in the grand final. The Mangere East Hawks won the pre-season Roope Rooster trophy. Ten teams competed in the Super 10 first division.

The Bears were coached by Del Hughes and included Duane Mann, Cliff Beverley, Brian Jellick, Boycie Nelson, Steve Buckingham and Ben Lythe in their side. Mangere East were coached by Joe Gwynne and included Tama Hohaia, Dean Clark, Tukere Barlow, Anthony Seuseu, Des Maea and Esau Mann.

Fred Robarts from Te Atatu won the season's best and fairest award. Ben Lythe was the season's top point scorer with 324 points.

The Hibiscus Coast Raiders won the second division Regional Cup while Mount Albert won the Phelan Shield.

=== Wellington ===
The Upper Hutt Tigers defeated Petone 24–20 in the Wellington Grand Final, winning the Appleton Shield for the second consecutive year. Upper Hutt were also the minor premiers while Paremata won the Plate final.

Tino Brown from Marist Northern won the Colin O'Neil Trophy.

=== Canterbury ===
Seven teams competed in Canterbury Rugby League's premier grade. The Papanui Tigers won the Pat Smith Challenge Trophy 27–22 over the Halswell Hornets. The Wayne Wallace coached Hornby Panthers won the Massetti Cup (minor premiership). Halswell featured Aaron Whittaker while Simon Angell played for Hornby, Blair Harding played for Papanui, David Vaealiki played for Sydenham and Phil Bergman and Paul Koloi played for Riccarton-Lincoln.

=== Other Competitions ===
In Northland three district club competitions were staged after costs forced the abandonment of the Northland-wide competition that had run in 1996 and 1997. The Takahiwai Warriors, celebrating their 65th year, won the Whangarei title while the Hokianga Pioneers won the Bay of Islands title.

Turangawaewae won the Waikato club competition, beating the Hamilton City Tigers 35–18 in the final. The Tigers won the minor premiership.

The Ngongotaha Chiefs won the combined Bay of Plenty-Coastline Super 10 competition, defeating Welcome Bay 33–24 in the Grand Final. Te Paamu won the Coastline competition, finishing as minor premiers before defeating Kawerau 62–10 in the final.

The Maraenui Phoenix dominated the Hawke's Bay competition, winning the Nines, pre-season, minor premiership and premiership titles. They defeated Taradale-Tamatea United 34–20 in the Grand Final.

The Waitara Bears defeated Midhirst Magpies 43–10 in the Taranaki Grand Final at Pukekura Park. The Bears also won the minor premiership.

Linton Army won their first premiership since 1992, by defeating Wanganui's Castlecliff 50–16 in the Grand Final.

In the South Island, the Whakatu Firebirds defeated the Motueka Tigers 32–28 to win the Nelson-Marlborough title.

The Marist Saints won the West Coast League in their 75th season, defeating minor premiers, the Waro-rakau Hornets, 23–12 in the Grand Final. The grand final was former Kiwi Wayne Dwyer's final match. He made his debut for the West Coast in 1978.

The Invercargill Stormers won the 150th Otago-Southland premier competition, defeating the South Pacific Raiders 23–18. The South Pacific Raiders won the Ellis Cup as the premier Otago champions.
