= 1999 New Zealand rugby league season =

Seasons
- 1998 2000

The 1999 New Zealand rugby league season was the 92nd season of rugby league that had been played in New Zealand. The main feature of the year was the National Provincial competition that was run by the New Zealand Rugby League.

== International competitions ==
The New Zealand national rugby league team competed in and co-hosted the inaugural Tri-Nations tournament. They lost the final to Australia after defeating both Australia and Great Britain in pool play. Earlier in the season the Kiwis had lost the Anzac Test to Australia and had defeated Tonga in a Test Match notable for Stacey Jones breaking his arm during the match. New Zealand were coached by Frank Endacott and included; Tri-Nations captain Richie Barnett, Sean Hoppe, Willie Talau, Ruben Wiki, Lesley Vainikolo, Robbie and Henry Paul, Stacey Jones, Jason Lowrie, Nigel and Joe Vagana, Nathan Cayless, Anzac Test captain Jarrod McCracken, Logan Swann, David Kidwell, Matt Rua, Terry Hermansson, Richard Swain, Brian Jellick, Tony Puletua, Stephen Kearney, Gene Ngamu and Craig Smith.

The New Zealand Māori rugby league team played, and lost to, Great Britain in the curtain raiser to the Tri-Nations final. The team was: Alex Chan, Steve Matthews, Lewis, Steve Berryman, Jared Mills, Luke Goodwin, Willie Rangi, Paul Rauhihi, Tukere Barlow, John Edmonds, Robert Henare, Darren Rameka, Andrew Wynyard. Substitutions: Gavin Bailey, Martin Moana, Frank Watene, Wairangi Koopu. Coach: Cameron Bell. Referee: David Pakieto. The Māori's had already toured Papua New Guinea earlier in the year. This team included Henry Perenara, Jamie Cook, Shontayne Hape and James Stosic.

The Junior Kiwis included Henry Perenara.

The New Zealand Universities team attended the Student World Cup in Great Britain. They won Pool B, accounting for Wales and Canada, and advanced through the finals. They defeated the England Students team 46–16 at The Boulevard, winning the World Cup.

== National competitions ==
=== Rugby League Cup ===
Waikato started the year holding the Rugby League Cup. Taranaki then challenged for the trophy, defeating Waikato 68–8 on 24 April.

=== National Provincial Competition ===
The New Zealand Rugby League ran a National Provincial Competition throughout the season. Auckland was divided into North and South. However a combined Auckland side defeated New South Wales Country 33–6. This side was coached by Stan Martin and included 8 Glenora Bears players, including Boycie Nelson and Steve Buckingham.

==== The Teams ====
- Northland Wild Boars.
- Auckland North were coached by the Dominic Clark (Glenora). The squad was: Jarrod Trott (Northcote), Steve Matthews (Glenora), Peter Lewis (Warriors), David Bailey (Glenora), Boycie Nelson (Glenora), Len Macginley (Hibiscus), Aaron Tucker (Glenora), Reece Guy (Hibiscus), Junior Fiu (Glenora), Brett Kingham (Glenora), Kosta Malamatinos (Glenora), Richard White (Hibiscus), Keneti Asiata (Northcote), Wairangi Koopu (Glenora), Greg Ashby (Glenora), Henry Perenara (Warriors), Cliff Beverley (Warriors), Lee Weatherill (Marist/Bay Roskill), Clinton Pouesi (Glenora), Jamie Cook (Northcote), Shane Endacott (Warriors). Gene Ngamu was later bought into the squad.
- Auckland South were coached by Stan Martin (Mangere East). The squad was: Tama Hohaia (Mangere East), Corey Palmer (Otahuhu), Charlie Kennedy (Mangere East), Ben Fahey (Otahuhu), Loni Filimeohala (Otahuhu), Fergie Edwards (Mangere East), Gus Malietoa-Brown (Tornadoes), Lionel Pereira (Manurewa), Scott Welsh (Manurewa), Dean Clark (Otahuhu), Channerith Ly (Manurewa), Shane Edwards (Otahuhu), Gaivin Welsh (Manurewa), Sam Hanson (Ellersllie), Eric Pele (Manukau), Jason Arama (Manurewa), Esau Mann (Mangere East), Bryan Henare (Warriors), Phillip Leuluai (Otahuhu), Sinave Gasu (Otahuhu), Clinton Toopi (Warriors), Wayne Barnett (Manurewa), Herman Lomafa (Mangere East), Eneasi Finefeuiaki (Mangere East), Aleo Kapua (Ellerslie). Henry Fa'afili and Hare Te Rangi also played for the side.
- Waikato were coached by Dennis Beazley and included Tukere Barlow.
- The Bay of Plenty Stags included former Kiwi Mark Woods.
- The Taranaki Sharks included James Stosic and three NSWRL First Division players signed from the Cronulla Sharks. They also named Tino Brown and Billy Weepu, who had both already played for Wellington. They were both ruled ineligible by the NZRL Appeals committee.
- Wellington included Paul Whatuira, Billy Weepu and Paul Howell. Wellington also lost to New South Wales Country 44–10.
- Canterbury were coached by Gerard Stokes and included Maurice Emslie, Lusi Sione and Mike Dorreen. Aaron Whittaker made a comeback halfway through the season, despite having retired from representative football.

==== Finals ====
Semifinals
1	Auckland South	22
2	Auckland North	0
3	Canterbury	32
4	Taranaki	41

Qualifying Final
Auckland North	20
Taranaki	18

Grand Final
Auckland South	24
Auckland North	22

Canterbury, Taranaki, Auckland North and Auckland South all qualified for the finals.

In a MacIntyre final four playoff system Taranaki defeated Canterbury 41–32 in the first round.

Auckland North defeated Taranaki 20–18 to qualify for the grand final against Auckland South.

The final was won by Auckland South who defeated Auckland North 24–22.

== Australian competitions ==
The Auckland Warriors competed in the National Rugby League competition. They finished 11th out of 20 teams and failed to make the playoffs.

== Club competitions ==
=== Auckland ===
The Glenora Bears won the pre-season Roope Rooster, the minor premiership Rukutai Shield and the grand final Fox Memorial to complete a clean sweep of the Auckland Rugby League club trophies. In the final, played at Carlaw Park, Glenora defeated Otahuhu 24–4. Glenora included Henry Perenara, David Bailey, Boycie Nelson, Steve Buckingham and Wairangi Koopu. The Super 12 tournament had been expanded to include two new teams; the Eastern Tornadoes and the Hibiscus Coast Raiders.

Gus Malietoa-Brown played for the Eastern Tornadoes while Dean Clark and Phillip Leuluai played for Otahuhu and Esau Mann represented Mangere East.

The Mount Albert Lions won the Sharman Cup.

=== Canterbury ===
Halswell and Horby met in the Canterbury Rugby League grand final which was held at Rugby League Park on 19 September. Halswell won 30–12. Mike Dorreen and Aaron Whittaker played for Halswell

Scott Codyre was named the outstanding player of the year.

Aranui High School won the Canterbury secondary schools senior competition.

=== Other Competitions ===
Turangawaewae won the Waikato Rugby League grand final, defeating Hukanui 32–22 at Davies Park in Huntly. Former Kiwi Kelly Shelford played for the Hamilton City Tigers.

Marist defeated the Waitara Bears 28–20 in the Taranaki Rugby League grand final.
