= Mark Woods (rugby league) =

New Zealand international rugby league footballer and coach

Personal information
- Full name: Mark Anthony Woods
- Born: 4 July 1965 (age 61)

Playing information
- Position: Prop, Second-row
Club
Years	Team	Pld	T	G	FG	P
	Ngongotaha Chiefs
1989–93	Upper Hutt Tigers
1994	Taranaki Rockets	22	2	0	0	8
1995–96	Waikato Cougars	26	0	0	0	0
1996	Bay of Plenty Stags	20	5	0	0	20
	Total	68	7	0	0	28
Representative
Years	Team	Pld	T	G	FG	P
19??–89	Bay of Plenty
1986–87	Northern Districts
1986–95	New Zealand Māori
1988–93	Wellington
1992	New Zealand	3	0	0	0	0

Mark Anthony Woods is a New Zealand former rugby league footballer who represented New Zealand in 1992.

== Playing career ==
Woods is a Ngongotaha Chiefs junior in the Bay of Plenty Rugby League district. He represented the Bay of Plenty and also played for the New Zealand Māori side, including at the 1986 Pacific Cup. Woods later captained the side.

After moving to Wellington, Woods represented New Zealand in 1992, playing in three Test matches - including one that counted towards the 1992 World Cup standings. He trialled for the Kiwis again in 1993 but was not selected for the tour of Great Britain.

In 1993 Woods captained the Upper Hutt Tigers to a Wellington Rugby League grand final victory and also represented the province in the National Provincial Championship.

In 1994 he joined the Taranaki Rockets in the new Lion Red Cup however he was not retained for the 1995 season, instead joining the Waikato Cougars. He represented both the Lion Red Cup XIII and the New Zealand Māori side that year.

Wood joined the Bay of Plenty Stags for the final season of the Lion Red Cup in 1996 and he represented them again in 1999 in the National Provincial Competition. In the three years of the Lion Red Cup, Woods made 60 appearances for Taranaki, Waikato and Bay of Plenty.

In 2001 Woods played for the Ngongotaha Chiefs in the Bartercard Cup, becoming the player-coach when Cameron Bell left midway through the season.

The Chiefs left the Bartercard Cup competition late in the 2001 season however Woods continued to play for the club until 2005, as they competed in the Bay of Plenty Rugby League and Waicoa Bay competitions.
