= Bartercard Cup seasons 2000–2002 =

The Bartercard Cup was a rugby league club competition in New Zealand that ran from 2000 until 2007. Bartercard Cup seasons 2000–2002 may refer to:

- 2000 Bartercard Cup
- 2001 Bartercard Cup
- 2002 Bartercard Cup
