= Doc Murray =

New Zealand rugby league footballer and coach

Personal information
- Full name: David Murray
- Born: 10 August 1972 (age 54)
- Height: 183 cm (6 ft 0 in)
- Weight: 83 kg (13 st 1 lb)

Playing information
- Position: Fullback, Centre
Club
Years	Team	Pld	T	G	FG	P
1994	Auckland City Vulcans	22	11	20	0	84
1996	Auckland Warriors	1	0	0	0	0
1997	Wigan Warriors	8	0	0	0	0
1997	Warrington Wolves	3	0	0	0	0
1998–00	Lancashire Lynx	48	23	9	0	110
	Total	82	34	29	0	194
Representative
Years	Team	Pld	T	G	FG	P
1993–94	Auckland	5	2	4	0	16
1996–00	New Zealand Māori
- Source: As of 8 December 2008

David "Doc" Murray (born 10 August 1972) is a New Zealand rugby league coach and former rugby league footballer. His position of preference was as a fullback.

== New Zealand career ==
Murray started his rugby league career playing for the Ellerslie Eagles club in the Auckland Rugby League competition. Between 1993 and 1994 he was an Auckland representative (playing 5 games and scoring 2 tries and 4 goals) and was a Kiwi trialist in 1993. In 1994 he played for the Auckland City Vulcans in the Lion Red Cup before signing with the Auckland Warriors.

Murray made his début in the then Optus Cup for the Auckland Warriors in 1996, starting as a fullback. It was the only first grade appearance he was to make for the side that year. He toured Papua New Guinea with the New Zealand Māori.

== Later years ==
In 1997 he moved to England, signing a two-year contract with the prestigious Wigan Warriors. However he did not find a place in the first grade side and late in the season he was loaned to the Warrington Wolves. Murray then spent 1998 loaned to the Lancashire Lynx club in the second division. During this time, he also had some trials with rugby union club, the London Wasps.

He returned to New Zealand in 2000, playing one season with the Ngongotaha Chiefs in the Bartercard Cup. During the season he was again selected to represent New Zealand Māori.

== Coaching career ==
Between 2006 and 2008 Murray coached the Otumoetai Eels in the Bay of Plenty Rugby League competition.
