= Jeremiah Pai =

New Zealand rugby league footballer

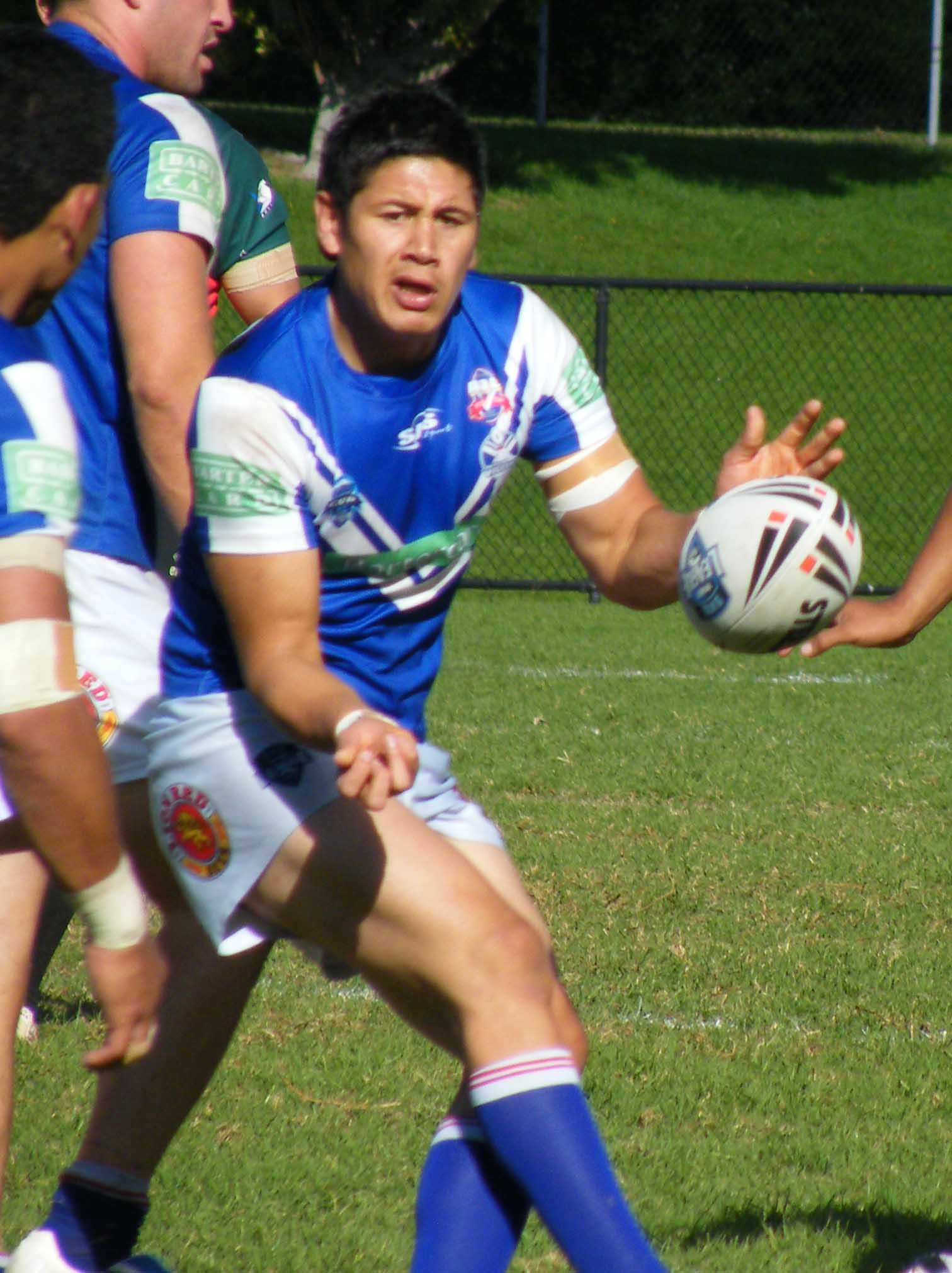

Personal information
- Full name: Jeremiah Pai
- Born: 18 April 1982 (age 44) New Zealand

Playing information
- Position: Five-eighth, Lock
Club
Years	Team	Pld	T	G	FG	P
2002	New Zealand Warriors	2	0	0	0	0
- Source: As of 6 November 2023

Jeremiah Pai is a New Zealand former professional rugby league footballer who plays for the Hibiscus Coast Raiders in the Sharman Cup (2024).

== Early years ==
He was first noticed when playing for the Eastern Tornadoes in the Bartercard Cup before making his National Rugby League debut for the New Zealand Warriors in 2002.

== Australia ==
After leaving the club he had stints with the Wests Tigers and in Parramatta and Melbourne but could not break into the first grade side. During his time with Melbourne he played for the North Sydney Bears due to a feeder agreement between the two clubs.

== Return to New Zealand ==
He then returned to New Zealand where played for the East Coast Bays Barracudas, Northcote Tigers and Hibiscus Coast Raiders and represented Auckland in both the New South Wales Cup and the Bartercard Premiership.

In 2006 Pai represented the New Zealand Māori side in a three match series against the Cook Islands.

In 2011, while playing for the Northcote Tigers, Pai won the Auckland Rugby League's Player of the Year award and was named at standoff in the Team of the Year. In 2012 Pai moved clubs, joining the Point Chevalier Pirates.

He was named in the New Zealand Māori squad in 2015 to play Auckland.
