= Jamie Cook =

Jamie Cook may refer to:

- Jamie Cook (born 1985), guitarist for the English band Arctic Monkeys
- Jamie Cook (footballer) (born 1979), English association football player
- Jamie Cook (rower) (born 1992), English rower
- Jamie Cook (rugby league), New Zealand rugby league footballer
