= Peter Lewis (rugby league) =

Cook Islands international rugby league footballer

Personal information
- Born: 30 May 1979 (age 47) Auckland, New Zealand

Playing information
- Height: 1.80 m (5 ft 11 in)
- Weight: 98 kg (15 st 6 lb)
- Position: Centre
Club
| Years | Team | Pld | T | G | FG | P |
|---|---|---|---|---|---|---|
| 1999 | Auckland Warriors | 11 | 1 | 0 | 0 | 4 |
| 2003 | Penrith Panthers | 2 | 0 | 0 | 0 | 0 |
| 2006 | Parramatta Eels | 2 | 0 | 0 | 0 | 0 |
| | Total | 15 | 1 | 0 | 0 | 4 |
Representative
| Years | Team | Pld | T | G | FG | P |
| 1999 | New Zealand Māori |
| 2000 | Cook Islands | 3 | 0 | 0 | 0 | 0 |

Peter Lewis (30 May 1979) is a former professional rugby league footballer who played as a centre in the 1990s, and 2000s. He played at representative level for New Zealand Māori and Cook Islands, and at club level for the Auckland Warriors, Penrith Panthers and the Parramatta Eels.

== Background ==
Lewis was born in Auckland, New Zealand, and is of Cook Islanders descent.

== Early years ==
A junior from Wellington's Upper Hutt, Lewis was signed by the Auckland Warriors in 1998 and moved to Auckland. In Auckland he played for the Warriors unbeaten reserve grade side in 1998 and was good enough to be selected for the Junior Kiwis. He attracted some interest from Australian clubs in 1999 but opted to remain with the Warriors. His decision was rewarded as he finally cracked first grade and played eleven games for the club. In the weeks he was not selected by the Warriors he played for Brisbane Souths in the Queensland Cup or Auckland North in the National Provincial Competition. In 2000 he played for the Mt Albert Lions in the Bartercard Cup.

== In Australia ==
Not wanted by the Warriors, Lewis moved to Australia in 2003, signing with the Penrith Panthers. Here he played two first grade games and also turned out for the St Mary's Cougars in the NSWRL Premier League.

He left the Panthers in 2005, signing a one-year contract with the Parramatta Eels. He played in pre-season trials for the first grade team but spent the season in the Premier League. However his form was good enough to earn a new contract for 2006. In 2006 he returned to first grade, playing two games for the Eels. However he then returned to Premier League competition.

== International ==
In 1999 he was selected by the New Zealand Māori and played against Great Britain.

However, in 2000 he decided to represent the Cook Islands, playing in the 2000 World Cup.

In 2004 he was again the subject of a tug of war, with the NSW Māori and the Cook Islands both selecting him in their squads for the 2004 Oceanic Pacifica Rugby League Tournament. He opted to play for the Cook Islands.

In 2006 Lewis again represented the Cook Islands, playing in the team that failed to qualify for the 2008 World Cup.
