= Vae Kololo =

Samoa international rugby league footballer

Personal information
- Full name: Faávae Kololo
- Born: 1972 (age 53–54) New Zealand

Playing information
- Position: Prop, Second-row
Representative
Years	Team	Pld	T	G	FG	P
2000	Samoa	1	0	0	0	0

Faávae Kololo is a former Samoa international rugby league footballer.

== Playing career ==
Kololo was contracted to the Auckland Warriors in 2000 but suffered a knee injury and did not play a first grade match.

Kololo played for Samoa in the 2000 World Cup.

From the Richmond Bulldogs, in 2001 he played for the Marist Richmond Brothers in the Bartercard Cup.
