= Billy Weepu =

New Zealand rugby league footballer and news camera operator

Personal information
- Born: Wellington, New Zealand

Playing information
- Height: 190 cm (6 ft 3 in)
- Weight: 130 kg (20 st 7 lb)
- Position: Prop
Club
Years	Team	Pld	T	G	FG	P
	Wainuiomata Lions
1995–97	Manly Sea Eagles	13	0	0	0	0
	Total	13	0	0	0	0
Representative
Years	Team	Pld	T	G	FG	P
2000	New Zealand Māori	2
- Relatives: Piri Weepu (brother)

Billy Weepu is a New Zealand former rugby league footballer who played for the Manly Sea Eagles in the NRL, and is now a news camera operator.

He is the brother of rugby union player Piri Weepu.

== Playing career ==
=== Early years ===
Weepu started his career with the Wainuiomata Lions in the Wellington Rugby League competition.

=== Manly Sea Eagles ===
He was then scouted by Manly and joined the club in 1994. He went on to play 13 first grade games for the club in 1995 and 1997 as well as becoming a regular in reserve grade.

He was regarded as one of the heaviest players to play in the Australian competition.

=== Return to New Zealand ===
Weepu played for both Wellington and Taranaki in the 1999 National Provincial Competition, becoming the subject of a NZRL appeal. Along with fellow Wellington prop, Tino Brown, Weepu was later ruled ineligible to play for the Taranaki Sharks.

With the start of the Bartercard Cup in 2000 Weepu was part of the Wainuiomata Lions side that participated in the first two seasons.

In 2002, with the demise of the Lions, he moved to the Central Falcons.

== Representative career ==
Weepu was selected for the Junior Kiwis in 1994.

In 2000 Weepu represented New Zealand Māori.

== Later years ==
Weepu worked as a Camera operator for TV3's Campbell Live until 2015. He previously worked on 60 Minutes. He remains with Newshub as of 2020.
