= Phillip Leuluai =

Samoa international rugby league footballer

Phil Leuluai
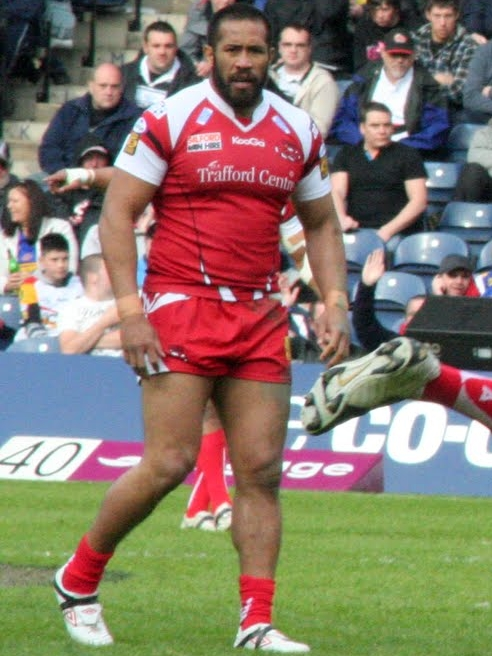

Personal information
- Full name: Phillip Leuluai
- Born: 16 July 1977 (age 49) Auckland, New Zealand

Playing information
- Height: 6 ft 2 in (1.87 m)
- Weight: 16 st 3 lb (103 kg)
- Position: Prop, Second-row
Club
Years	Team	Pld	T	G	FG	P
2005–07	Cronulla Sharks	30	1	0	0	4
2007–10	Salford City Reds	87	7	0	0	28
2010–11	Lézignan Sangliers	13	2	0	0	0
	Total	130	10	0	0	32
Representative
Years	Team	Pld	T	G	FG	P
2000–09	Samoa	6	0	0	0	0
- Education: St Paul's College, Auckland
- Relatives: James Leuluai (brother); Thomas Leuluai (nephew); Macgraff Leuluai (nephew); Kylie Leuluai (nephew); Marley Leuluai (great nephew)

Phillip Leuluai (born 16 July 1977) is a former Samoa international rugby league footballer who played as a second-row or occasional prop for the Salford City Reds in the Super League.

== Background ==
Leuluai in Greenlane, Auckland, New Zealand. He is of Samoan heritage.

== Playing career ==
An Otahuhu Leopards junior, Leuluai previously played for the Eastern Tornadoes, Newtown Jets and Cronulla Sharks.

He joined Salford City Reds on 27 August 2007 after their Aussie head coach Shaun McRae signed him on a 2 1/2-year contract for an undisclosed figure.

He joined the French club Lézignan Sangliers for the 2010/11 season.

== Representative career ==
Leuluai represented Auckland in the 1997 Super League Challenge Cup, and Auckland South in the 1999 National Provincial Competition.

He toured Australia with the New Zealand Residents in 2000.

In 2002 Leuluai toured France and the United States with New Zealand 'A'.

Leuluai was named in the Samoa training squad for the 2008 Rugby League World Cup but did not make the final squad.

In 2009 he was named as part of the Samoan side for the Pacific Cup.
