= Christchurch City Shiners =

Defunct New Zealand rugby league club

Club information
- Founded: 1994; 32 years ago
- Exited: 1996; 30 years ago

Former details
- Grounds: Addington Showgrounds; Queen Elizabeth II Park; Warren Park
- Coach: Wayne Wallace / Lex Clarke
- Competition: Lion Red Cup

The Christchurch City Shiners were a New Zealand rugby league club that represented Christchurch in the Lion Red Cup from 1994 to 1996. They were administered by the Canterbury Rugby League.

Feeder clubs included Addington, Sydenham and Linwood.

== Players ==
Notable players included Simon Angell, Blair Harding, Richard Morris, Brett Roger, Andrew Koro Vincent, Shane Endacott, Phil Bergman, Vii Mulipola, and Marty Crequer.

== Coaches ==
The Shiners had four different coaches over the three years of the competition: Wayne Wallace, Mark Vincent, Lex Clark and Jeff Carr. Kiwis coach Frank Endacott assisted Wallace in the first year of the competition.

== Season Results ==
Season	Pld	W	D	L	PF	PA	PD	Pts	Position	Finals
1994	22	6	0	16	358	630	-272	12	Eleventh	N/A
1995	22	12	1	9	455	419	36	25	Sixth	N/A
1996	22	3	0	19	360	643	-283	6	Wooden Spoon	N/A
