= Andrew Leota =

Tongan rugby footballer (born 1988)

Andrew Pauli David Leota
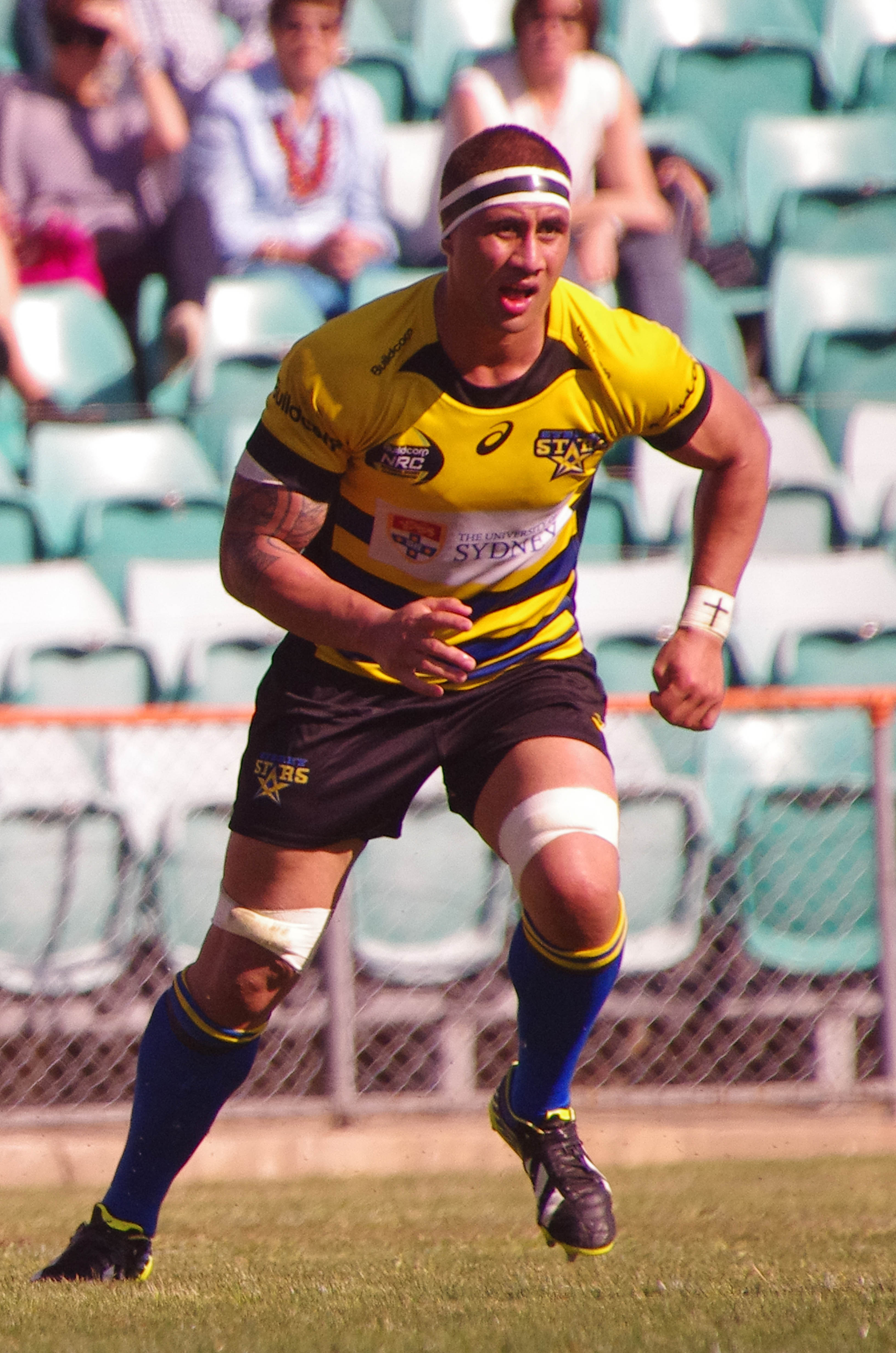
- Andrew Leota

Personal information
- Full name: Andrew P. Leota
- Born: 1975/01/23

Playing information

Rugby league
- Position: Prop
Representative
Years	Team	Pld	T	G	FG	P
2000	Tonga

Rugby union
- Position: Flanker
Club
Years	Team	Pld	T	G	FG	P
2004–2005	Bay of Plenty

Andrew Leota is a Tongan rugby footballer who represented Tonga in rugby league at the 2000 World Cup.

== Playing career ==
Leota originally played rugby league, playing for the Sydney Tigers U21 1995-1996 and being named in the Tonga squad for the 2000 World Cup and representing Coastline between 1997 and 2001. He played for the Ngongotaha Chiefs in the 2000 Bartercard Cup.

Leota played for the Te Paamu club in Coastline Rugby League and Waicoa Bay competitions.

In 2003, Leota switched codes to rugby union and in 2004 represented the Bay of Plenty sevens team and he also made his debut for the Bay of Plenty Rugby Union in the National Provincial Championship. By 2006 Leota was playing for Bay of Plenty B.
