= Masoe =

Masoe is a Samoan surname. Notable people with the surname include:

- Chris Masoe (born 1979), Samoan-born New Zealand rugby union player
- Maselino Masoe (born 1966), Samoan boxer
- Mose Masoe (born 1989), New Zealand-born Samoan international rugby league player
