= Phil Bergman =

NZ Maori international rugby league player

Personal information
- Born: 12 February 1971 (age 55) New Zealand

Playing information
- Position: Stand-off
Club
Years	Team	Pld	T	G	FG	P
1995	Christchurch City	5	0	0	0	0
1997	Paris Saint-Germain	21	14	0	0	56
	Total	26	14	0	0	56
Representative
Years	Team	Pld	T	G	FG	P
1992–??	Canterbury
1998	New Zealand Māori

Phil Bergman (born 12 February 1971) is a New Zealand former rugby league footballer who represented New Zealand Māori and played professionally for Paris Saint-Germain in the Super League.

== Playing career ==
Bergman signed with the Auckland Warriors in 1995 and played three games for the Auckland Warriors Colts team in the 1995 Lion Red Cup. He also played five matches for the Christchurch City Shiners.

Bergman also had a stint with the Sydney Roosters reserve grade.

In 1996 he moved to France and played for Paris Saint-Germain in the Super League.

After returning to New Zealand, Bergman played for the Riccarton-Lincoln club and represented Canterbury.

In 2000 he represented the Tasman Orcas and was named in the Mainland Super 10 dreamteam. Tasman were coached by his brother, Paul Bergman. He was later called up to the 2000 Bartercard Cup, joining the Porirua Pumas.

== Representative career ==
Bergman was a New Zealand Residents player in 1995.

Bergman represented New Zealand in the 1998 Oceania Sevens tournament. He also toured the Cook Islands with the 1998 New Zealand Māori squad.

== Later years ==
After retiring Bergman worked as a player agent for the Sydney Roosters.

He coached the Tasman Titans in the 2011 South Island zone competition.
