= Richie Blackmore (rugby league) =

New Zealand rugby league coach

Personal information
- Full name: James Richard Blackmore
- Born: 2 July 1969 (age 57) New Zealand

Playing information
- Height: 188 cm (6 ft 2 in)
- Weight: 104 kg (16 st 5 lb)

Rugby league
- Position: Centre, Wing
Club
Years	Team	Pld	T	G	FG	P
	Otahuhu Leopards
1991–94	Castleford	111	64	0	0	256
1995–96	Auckland Warriors	27	11	0	0	44
1998–00	Leeds Rhinos	78	29	0	0	116
2001	New Zealand Warriors	8	2	0	0	8
	Total	224	106	0	0	424
Representative
Years	Team	Pld	T	G	FG	P
1991–??	Auckland
1991–00	New Zealand	25	15	0	0	60

Rugby union
- Position: Centre
Club
Years	Team	Pld	T	G	FG	P
2000	Leeds Tykes

Coaching information
Club
Years	Team	Gms	W	D	L	W%
2006–10	Otahuhu Leopards	0	0	0	0
Representative
Years	Team	Gms	W	D	L	W%
2010	New Zealand Māori	0	0	0	0
2011	Auckland Vulcans	0	0	0	0
2015	Auckland	0	0	0	0

James Richard "Richie" Blackmore (born 2 July 1969) is a rugby league coach, and former professional footballer who represented New Zealand. His position of preference was as a centre.

== Early years ==
An Otahuhu junior, Blackmore also played rugby union until he was 21. He was regarded as a promising loose forward.

== Castleford ==
Blackmore joined Castleford at the start of the 1991-92 season and quickly established himself in the team. He played 111 senior games for the club, leaving at the end of the 1994–1995 season. It was in Castleford that Blackmore had an off field incident with Tawera Nikau that resulted in Nikau refusing to play for the New Zealand national rugby league team if Blackmore was in the same team.

Richie Blackmore played at centre and scored a try in Castleford's 12–28 defeat by Wigan in the 1992 Challenge Cup Final during the 1991–92 season at Wembley Stadium, London on Saturday 2 May 1992, in front of a crowd of 77,386.

Richie Blackmore played at centre in Castleford Tigers' 33–2 victory over Wigan in the 1993–94 Regal Trophy Final during the 1993–94 season at Headingley, Leeds on Saturday 22 January 1994.

== Auckland Warriors ==
Blackmore joined the new Auckland Warriors side in 1995, however he missed the opening rounds due to the overlap with the British season. As a result, he found it hard to secure a place in the starting line up and played only ten first grade games in 1995.

Blackmore played another seventeen games for the Auckland Warriors in 1996 before deciding to return to England.

== Leeds Rhinos ==
Blackmore joined the Leeds Rhinos in 1997, joining the Super League competition. He played for Leeds Rhinos at centre, scoring their sole try in the 1998 Super League Grand Final loss to Wigan Warriors. He went on to play 45 first grade games for the club.

In mid-1999 Blackmore suffered a serious leg injury that kept him out for most of the season.

In 2000, while recovering from injury, Blackmore played rugby union for the Leeds Tykes against Sale in Round Four of the Tetley's Bitter Cup.

== Return & Retirement ==
At the end of the 2000 season Blackmore signed a one-year deal with the renamed New Zealand Warriors who were looking for an experience back to help shape their youthful squad. Blackmore played eight first grade games for the club, before retiring at the end of the season.

He continued to play in the Auckland Rugby League competition, moving into the second row. In 2005 he was the player-coach of the Manurewa Marlins when they won the Fox Memorial. He retired properly at the end of that season, taking up the head coach position at Otahuhu in 2006.

== International career ==
Richie Blackmore was a New Zealand international, making his début for the Kiwis in 1991. Blackmore represented the Kiwis in both the 1995 and 2000 Rugby League World Cups.

== Coaching ==
After retiring from playing Blackmore remained involved with the Warriors, and was often seen running out water to the team during matches.

In 2006 Blackmore accepted a role as head coach of the Otahuhu Leopards in the Auckland Rugby League competition. He held this position until the end of 2010, leading the team to a Fox Memorial grand final victory over the Mt Albert Lions.

In 2008 Blackmore joined the New Zealand Māori team as assistant coach. He was co-coach in 2010 along with Mark Horo.

In 2011 Blackmore was appointed as head coach of the Auckland Vulcans in the NSW Cup, and coached the team to the Grand Final.

In 2012 he was to be appointed coach of the Leigh Centurions, however visa concerns meant he was instead appointed as the club's Business Development Manager, starting his position in April 2012.

In 2014 he coached the Papakura Sea Eagles in the Auckland Rugby League competition. He coached Auckland in 2015.
