= Bay of Plenty Rugby League =

Local sporting body in New Zealand

Bay of Plenty Rugby League is the local sporting body responsible for the administration of Rugby league in the Bay of Plenty region of New Zealand. Following the restructuring of the New Zealand Rugby League they are part of the Upper Central Zone along with Waikato Rugby League, Coastline Rugby League and Gisborne Tairawhiti Rugby League.

== Current domestic teams ==
=== Premier Division clubs 2024 ===
- Arataki Bears (Tauranga) - Arataki Park
- Forestland Falcons (Tokoroa) - Memorial Sports Ground
- Pacific Sharks (Tokoroa) - Memorial Sports Ground
- Pikiao Warriors (Mourea) - Pukaretu Reserve
- Mangakino Hawks (Mangakino) - Mangakino Sports Fields
- Taupō Phoenix (Taupō) - Hickling Park
- Te Paamu/TePuke Tigers (Te Puke) - Pakowhai Park

=== Championship Division clubs for 2024 ===
- Central Pride (Rotorua) - Puketāwhero Park
- Forestland Falcons (Tokoroa) - Memorial Sports Ground
- Ngongotahā Chiefs (Rotorua) - Puketāwhero Park
- Pacific Sharks (Tokoroa) - Memorial Sports Ground
- Pāpāmoa Bulldogs (Pāpāmoa) - Gordon Spratt Reserve
- Pikiao Warriors (Mourea) - Pukaretu Reserve
- Tauranga Whalers (Tauranga) - Arataki Park
- Tauhara Te Maunga (Taupō) - Hickling Park
- Te Paamu/TePuke Tigers (Te Puke) - Pakowhai Park

Past winners Premier & Championship Grades
Season	Premiership Grandfinal			Minor Premiers	Competition	Season	Championship Grandfinal		
Season	Premiers	Score	Runners up	Minor Premiers	Competition	Season	Champions	Score	Runners up
2024	Arataki	28-20	Pacific	Arataki	Bay of Plenty	2024	Pāpāmoa	36-30	Pikiao
2023	Forestlands	42-12	Pikiao	Forestlands	Bay of Plenty	2023	Te Paamu		Tauranga
2022	Forestlands	30-22	Mangakino	Forestlands	Bay of Plenty	2022	Pāpāmoa		
2021	Pacific	32-22	Mangakino	Mangakino	Bay of Plenty	2021	Forestlands		
2020	Taupō	46-20	Pikiao	Taupō	Bay of Plenty	2020	No Grade (COVID 19)		
2019	Taupō	32-24	Pacific	Taupō	Bay of Plenty	2019	Pacific		
2018	Ngongotahā		Mangakino	Mangakino	Bay of Plenty	2018	Tauhara		
2017	Pikiao	10-8	Pacific	Pikiao	Bay of Plenty	2017			
2016	Pacific	Ces Mountford Winners (Local)			Bay of Plenty	2016			
2016	Hamilton City	24-19	Pacific	Hamilton City	WaiCoa Bay				
2015	Pacific	34-30	Taupō	Pacific	Bay of Plenty	2015			
2014	Pikiao	30-26	Pacific	Pacific	Bay of Plenty	2014	Reporoa		Pacific
2013	Pacific		Pikiao	Pacific	Bay of Plenty	2013	Central		Pikiao
2012	Pacific	Ces Mountford Winners (Local)			Bay of Plenty	2012			
2012	Hamilton City	26-12	Ngaruawāhia	Hamilton City	WaiCoa Bay				
2011	Tauranga	24-18	Pacific	Pikiao	Bay of Plenty	2011			
2011	Hamilton City	26-6	Taniwharau	Hamilton City	WaiCoa Bay				
2010	Ōtumoetai	24-18	Ngongotahā	Ōtumoetai	Bay of Plenty	2010			

== Previous National Competitions ==
Between 1994 and 1996, the Bay of Plenty region was represented by the Bay of Plenty Stags in the Lion Red Cup competition.

=== Lion Red Cup results ===
Season	Pld	W	D	L	PF	PA	PD	Pts	Position	Finals
1994	22	2	0	20	262	800	-538	4	Wooden Spoon	N/A
1995	22	2	1	19	304	752	-448	5	Wooden Spoon	N/A
1996	22	11	3	8	440	441	-1	25	Fifth	Lost Elimination Play-off

=== Bartercard Premiership results ===
Season	Pld	W	D	L	PF	PA	PD	Pts	Position	Finals
2008	5	1	0	4	114	186	-72	2	Fifth	N/A
2008	5	0	0	5	70	254	-184	0	Wooden Spoon	N/A

== Bartercard Cup ==
The Bay of Plenty region has been represented by two separate teams in the Bartercard Cup competition.

- The Ngongotaha Chiefs competed in the 2000 and 2001 seasons. The team is notable for losing the first sixteen matches of the 2001 season, causing the Chiefs to withdraw from the competition six rounds before the completion of the season.
- The Waicoa Bay Stallions, a co-operative team involving players from Waikato, Coastline and Bay of Plenty federations, joined the competition in 2004, replacing the Taranaki Wildcats. The team is notable for having former international Tawera Nikau as head coach for their inaugural year. The Stallions folded along with the competition at the end of the 2007 season.

Team	Season	Pld	W	D	L	PF	PA	PD	Pts	Position	Finals
Chiefs	2000	22	4	0	18	424	685	-261	8	Eleventh (Twelve)	N/A
Chiefs	2001	16	0	0	16	282	1000	-718	0	Twelfth (Twelve)	N/A
Stallions	2004	16	4	2	10	380	455	-75	10	Ninth (Twelve)	N/A
Stallions	2005	16	3	0	13	368	620	-252	6	Wooden Spoon (Twelve)	N/A
Stallions	2006	18	5	2	11	494	662	-168	12	Eighth (Ten)	N/A
Stallions	2007	18	5	1	12	418	682	-264	11	Seventh (10)	N/A
