= Tangia Tongiia =

Cook Island rugby league footballer

Playing information
- Position: Wing
Representative
Years	Team	Pld	T	G	FG	P
2000	Cook Islands	2	0	0	0	0

Tangia Tongiia is a Cook Islands former professional rugby league footballer who played as a winger in the 1990s and 2000s. He played at representative level for the Cook Islands, and at club level in New Zealand for the Papanui Tigers and the Canterbury Bulls.

== Playing career ==
Tongiia played for the Papanui club in the Canterbury Rugby League competition during the 1998 and 1999 seasons.

He then was picked to represent the Canterbury Bulls in the 2000, 2001 and 2002 Bartercard Cups.

== Representative career ==
Tongiia won caps for Cook Islands in the 2000 Rugby League World Cup.

== Note ==
Tangia's surname is variously spelt with one, or two i's, i.e. Tongia, or Tongiia.

== Conviction ==
On 27 August 2026, Taongiia was sentenced to eight years and three months in prison after a jury found him guilty of rape and sexual violation by unlawful sexual connection in June 2026.
