= Hare Te Rangi =

New Zealand rugby league footballer

Personal information
- Born: 24 July 1977 (age 49) Rotorua, New Zealand

Playing information
- Height: 170 cm (5 ft 7 in)
- Weight: 73 kg (11 st 7 lb)
- Position: Halfback
Representative
Years	Team	Pld	T	G	FG	P
1998–00	New Zealand Māori	2	1	0	0	4

Hare Te Rangi is a New Zealand former rugby league footballer who represented New Zealand Māori at the 2000 World Cup.

== Playing career ==
Te Rangi started his career with the Piako Warriors, who won the Bay of Plenty Rugby League grand final in 1995. He was then selected for the Auckland Warriors development program in 1996.

In 1997 he was the leading try scorer in the Auckland Rugby League competition, winning the Tetley Trophy for the Otahuhu Leopards.

He played for the Leopards in the 2000 Bartercard Cup grand final before switching in 2001 to the Eastern Tornadoes. As a Bay of Plenty representative, in 2001 he was selected for the Northern Districts team that played the touring French side.

== Representative career ==
Te Rangi represented the New Zealand at Under 17s, Under 18s and Under 19s.

In 1998 he was selected for the New Zealand Māori tour of the Cook Islands. He again represented the Māori in 2000 against Fiji and at the World Cup.

Te Rangi also toured Australia in 2000 with the New Zealand Residents.

== Personal life ==
Te Rangi has also represented the Bay of Plenty in Lawn Bowls.
