= Gisborne Tairawhiti rugby league team =

New Zealand rugby league team

Gisborne Tairawhiti
Club information
- Nickname: Lions

Current details
- Ground: Awapuni Stadium
- Competition: New Zealand Rugby League

Records
- Rugby League Cup: 2007

The Gisborne Tairawhiti rugby league team are New Zealand rugby league team that represents the Gisborne Tairawhiti Rugby League. In the past they were known as the Gisborne East Coast Lions.

== History ==
The Gisborne and East Coast region has not been a strong rugby league area and as a result the team has not been very strong at a national level. For example, the team was winless between 1991 and 1994.

The team did not compete in the Lion Red Cup, with the region being represented by the Hawke's Bay Unicorns. In 1995 Gisborne-East Coast defeated Northland for the first time ever.

The region was not represented in the Bartercard Cup.

In 2007 Gisborne Tairawhiti won the Rugby League Cup, eventually losing the challenge trophy to the Hawke's Bay 58-6 on 15 September 2007.

Currently the region is represented in the National Zonal Competition by the Waicoa Bay Stallions.
