= Wainuiomata Lions =

NZ rugby league club, based in Wainuiomata

Current details
- Ground: Wise Park
- Competition: Wellington Rugby League

Records
- Premierships: 1989, 1991, 1992, 1999, 2004, 2007, 2023, 2024
- National Club Champions: 1990, 1992, 2007

The Wainuiomata Lions are a New Zealand rugby league club based in Wainuiomata, Wellington. They compete in the Wellington Rugby League competition.

In the early 1990s, prior to the creation Lion Red Cup national league competition based on provincial teams, Wainuiomata was one of the strongest rugby league teams in New Zealand. They made the final of the 1989 national club competition but went down 10–4 to Northcote. They returned to Carlaw Park the following year to beat Otahuhu 34–12 to win the 1990 title.

A match was also organised against the National Rugby League team Manly Warringah Sea Eagles and played at Fraser Park, Lower Hutt in January 1991. Manly, featuring international stars such as Matthew Ridge and Martin Bella, were the victors 20 points to 8.

In 1992 Wainuiomata beat Northcote 25–18 to again win the national club championship.

== Notable players ==
Notable past players include:

- Ali Davys
- David Faiumu
- Marvin Karawana
- Ken Laban
- David Lomax
- John Lomax
- Yogi Rogers
- Ava Seumanufagai
- Tana Umaga
- Earl Va’a
- Billy Weepu
- Piri Weepu
- Paul Whatuira

== Bartercard Cup ==
Between 2000 and 2001 they competed in the national Bartercard Cup competition before being replaced by the Wellington Orcas.

Season	Pld	W	D	L	PF	PA	PD	Pts	Position (Teams)	Finals
2000	22	13	0	9	668	542	126	26	Fourth (Twelve)	Lost Preliminary Final
2001	22	11	1	10	688	628	60	23	Sixth (Twelve)	N/A
