= Coastline rugby league team =

NZ rugby league club, based in the Bay of Plenty

Club information
- Nickname: Mariners
- Founded: 1995; 31 years ago

Current details
- Competition: New Zealand Rugby League

Records
- Rugby League Cup: 2000-01

The Coastline rugby league team are New Zealand rugby league team that represents the Coastline Rugby League. They have been nicknamed the Mariners.

== History ==
The first time Coastline competed as an independent district was in 1995, previously they had been represented by the Bay of Plenty side. They recorded their first ever win when they defeated Gisborne-East Coast 41–32 in their debut season.

In 2000 Coastline won the Rugby League Cup. They lost the Cup to Tasman in early 2001.

Between 2004 and 2007 they were represented by the Waicoa Bay Stallions in the Bartercard Cup.

=== Notable players ===
In 2001 the Mariners were coached by former Kiwi Tony Gordon and included Tongan international Andrew Leota.
