= Porirua Pumas =

Defunct NZ rugby league club, based in Porirua

Club information
- Founded: 2000
- Exited: 2002

Former details
- Ground: Porirua Park
- Coach: Mike Kuiti

The Porirua Pumas were a team representing the Porirua region in New Zealand's Bartercard Cup Rugby league competition. The Pumas were one of two Wellington-based teams in the competition, the other being the Wainuiomata Lions. They were replaced in 2002 by the Wellington Orcas. The Porirua Pumas Club is now defunct, with the region now represented at national domestic level by the Wellington Rugby League representative team in the National Provincial Competition.

== Bartercard Cup ==
Season	Pld	W	D	L	PF	PA	PD	Pts	Position (Teams)	Finals
2000	22	3	1	18	506	777	-271	7	Wooden Spoon (Twelve)	N/A
2001	21	4	1	16	421	808	-387	11*	Eleventh (Twelve)	N/A

* The Ngongotaha Chiefs withdrew from the competition after round sixteen. All teams scheduled to play them after this were awarded two points for a bye.
