= Anthony Seuseu =

New Zealand rugby league footballer

Personal information
- Born: 24 March 1979 (age 47) New Zealand

Playing information
- Position: Prop
Club
| Years | Team | Pld | T | G | FG | P |
|---|---|---|---|---|---|---|
| 2001 | New Zealand Warriors | 1 | 0 | 0 | 0 | 0 |
| 2003 | Halifax | 12 | 1 | 0 | 0 | 4 |
| 2003 | Doncaster |
| | Total | 13 | 1 | 0 | 0 | 4 |
- Source: As of 3 December 2008
- Relatives: Jerry Seu Seu (brother)

Anthony Seuseu (born 24 March 1979) is a New Zealand former professional rugby league footballer. His position of choice was as a prop. He is the younger brother of Jerry Seuseu.

== Playing career ==
=== Early years ===
A Counties Manukau Heroes player in the Lion Red Cup, in 1998 Seuseu played for the Mangere East Hawks in the Auckland Rugby League competition.

=== In New Zealand ===
Seuseu then joined the Hibiscus Coast Raiders, playing in New Zealand's Bartercard Cup. He toured Australia with the New Zealand Residents in 2000. Like his brother Jerry he eventually made the New Zealand Warriors squad, playing one National Rugby League game in 2001. In 2002 he was again in the squad however he did not play any first grade games.

=== Move to England ===
Seuseu signed for the Halifax in 2003, a club in the English Super League. However, due to work permit problems his arrival was held up and he was rushed into the squad, playing his first game the week he arrived. He played twelve games for Halifax.

He joined Doncaster for the remainder of the year, playing in the National Leagues.

== Retirement ==
Seuseu has since returned to New Zealand. In 2007 he was the trainer for the Auckland Harbour U/18's side.

Anthony is currently the CEO of Digicel Samoa Limited and joined Digicel in 2019 after working in the telecommunication industry in New Zealand for over 15 years.
