= Jonathan Smith (rugby league) =

New Zealand rugby league footballer

Personal information
- Born: 28 February 1979 (age 47)
- Height: 183 cm (6 ft 0 in)
- Weight: 91 kg (14 st 5 lb)

Playing information
- Position: Second-row
Club
Years	Team	Pld	T	G	FG	P
2000–01	Auckland Warriors	7	0	0	0	0
Representative
Years	Team	Pld	T	G	FG	P
1998	New Zealand Māori
- Source: As of 23 December 2008

Jonathan Smith (born 28 February 1979) is a former New Zealand rugby league footballer. His position of preference was in the second row.

== Playing career ==
A junior from the Mangere East Hawks, Smith was a Junior Kiwi in 1998. He was then signed by the Auckland Warriors in 2000. While at the Warriors he played in the Queensland Cup for Wynnum Manly Seagulls and Brisbane Souths due to a feeder agreement between the clubs and also played for the Otahuhu Leopards in the Bartercard Cup. He went on to make seven first grade appearances for the club between 2000 and 2001. Confusingly there was also a Jonathon Smith at the club at the same time, although he did not make any first grade appearances. He came off contract at the end of the 2001 season and was not offered a new deal.

He played for Otahuhu in the 2002 Bartercard Cup.

== Representative career ==
Smith toured the Cook Islands in 1998 with the New Zealand Māori.
