= Wellington Rugby League =

New Zealand sports body

- Sport: Rugby League
- Founded: 12 May 1912
- Affiliation: New Zealand Rugby League
- Location: Wellington Region, NZL

Official website
- www.sporty.co.nz/wellingtonleague/Home-1
- (New Zealand)

Wellington Rugby League is the local sporting body responsible for the administration of Rugby league in the Greater Wellington region. It is responsible for the local competition of the same name, as well as its representative team, the Wellington rugby league team.

== Domestic Competition ==
The Senior WRL competition involves 9 teams in the Premier Grade with most fielding a Reserve Grade team also:

- Petone Panthers (Lower Hutt)
- Porirua Vikings (Porirua)
- Randwick Kingfishers (Lower Hutt)
- St George Dragons (Porirua)
- Te Aroha Eels (Lower Hutt)
- University Hunters (Wellington City)
- Upper Hutt Tigers (Upper Hutt)
- Wainuiomata Lions (Lower Hutt)
- Whiti Te Rā (Otaki)
- TOA Rugby league (Porirua)

The 5 other clubs that aren't in the Senior WRL are:

- Harbour City Eagles (Wellington City)
- Kapiti Bears (Kapiti Coast)
- Porirua City Phoenix (Porirua)
- Titahi Bay Marlins (Porirua)
- Trentham Titans (Upper Hutt)

The winner is awarded the Appleton Shield, which has been in use since 1940. In 1912 four teams played for the Seigel Cup; Petone, Hutt, Athletic and Newtown. Petone won the first ever Wellington club competition.

== History ==
Wellington played its first game on 24 August 1908 when they took on Auckland at Victoria Park, Auckland in the first provincial game of rugby league in New Zealand.

During 1909, 1910 and 1911 Wellington continued to play a number of provincial games and, in 1909, defeated Auckland in Auckland, 22-19, the first of only five victories over Auckland in over 100 years.

=== Foundation ===
The Wellington Rugby League Association was officially formed on 23 May 1912 at the Trades Hall in Wellington when 1907-08 All Golds captain, Hercules Richard (Bumper) Wright presided over a meeting of 75 footballers and supporters, many of them prominent rugby union players in Wellington.

The founding committee was chaired by W J Riorden and included Daniel Fraser.

=== Post War years ===
Will Appleton was president of the Wellington Rugby Football League between 1940 and 1958 and presented the Appleton Shield, which is used to this day as the premier club trophy.

=== 1990-1994 :Touring teams ===
In 1990 Wellington defeated the touring Great Britain side 30-22. This is Wellington's only victory over a touring side.

=== 1994-2000: Lion Red Cup ===
Between 1994 and 1996, Wellington was represented by the Wellington City Dukes and Hutt Valley Firehawks in the Lion Red Cup. One player from the Dukes, Earl Va'a, later went on to represent Samoa in Rugby union. Both teams folded along with the competition in 1996.

Team	Season	Pld	W	D	L	PF	PA	PD	Pts	Position	Finals
Hutt Valley	1994	22	9	0	13	458	489	-30	18	Eighth	N/A
Wellington City	1994	22	8	0	14	470	508	-38	16	Ninth	N/A
Hutt Valley	1995	22	13	0	9	544	443	101	26	Fifth	Lost Elimination Play-off
Wellington City	1995	22	10	2	10	440	514	-74	22	Seventh	N/A
Hutt Valley	1996	22	11	2	9	444	469	-25	24	Sixth	N/A
Wellington City	1996	22	9	0	13	536	532	4	18	Eighth	N/A

=== 2000-2007: Bartercard Cup ===
Wellington initially had two sides in the Bartercard Cup competition - the Porirua Pumas and the Wainuiomata Lions, based in the city of Porirua and Lower Hutt suburb of Wainuiomata respectively. Results between the two were dissimilar - with Wainuiomata reaching the preliminary final in the first season, and Porirua coming last place in theirs. However, in 2002 it was decided that one team (later to be named the Wellington Orcas) was needed in the competition. They narrowly missed out on a finals spot in 2002, being on equal points but with a lower For and Against than the Marist Richmond Brothers. Unfortunately this was a high point for the franchise with the team never making the play-offs.

In 2006, the then-unnamed Bartercard Cup franchises adopted the name of Wellington Orcas, after the unsuccessful NRL expansion bid.

Team	Season	Pld	W	D	L	PF	PA	PD	Pts	Position (Teams)	Finals
Porirua	2000	22	3	1	18	506	777	-271	7	Wooden Spoon (Twelve)	N/A
Wainuiomata	2000	22	13	0	9	668	542	126	26	Fourth (Twelve)	Lost Preliminary Final
Porirua	2001	21	4	1	16	421	808	-387	11	Eleventh (Twelve)	N/A
Wainuiomata	2001	22	11	1	10	688	628	60	23	Sixth (Twelve)	N/A
Wellington	2002	16	9	1	6	547	449	98	19	Sixth (Twelve)	N/A
Wellington	2003	16	4	1	11	460	646	-186	6	Eleventh (Twelve)	N/A
Wellington	2004	16	8	1	7	465	409	56	17	Sixth (Twelve)	N/A
Wellington	2005	16	5	3	8	418	459	-41	13	Eighth (Twelve)	N/A
Wellington	2006	18	6	0	12	452	549	-97	12	Seventh (Ten)	N/A
Wellington	2007	18	10	0	8	509	529	-20	20	Sixth (10)	N/A

=== 2008-2009: Bartercard Premiership ===
The Wellington Rugby League were awarded a place in the new six-team National Provincial Competition as the region Wellington. The team plays its home matches at Porirua Park.

Season	Pld	W	D	L	PF	PA	PD	Pts	Position	Finals
2008	5	2	1	2	146	138	8	5	Fourth	N/A
2009	5	2	0	3	142	120	22	4	Fourth	Lost Semi Final

=== 2010-present: NZRL National Competition ===
Wellington Rugby League was then placed in the NZRL National Competition as the replacement competition for the Bartercard Premiership, known as the "Wellington Orcas".

== NRL Bid ==
In 2004, working with the Wellington Rugby League, a consortium called the Southern Orcas was involved in bidding for a National Rugby League franchise to be based in the city. The franchise ultimately went to the Gold Coast who joined the NRL for the 2007 season.

In 2007 reports emerged that the consortium was looking at the possibility of joining Super League however nothing ever eventuated.

== Notable juniors competed in the NRL ==
Petone Panthers

- Vince Mellars
- Issac Luke

Randwick Kingfishers

- Mose Masoe
- Sika Manu
- Ben Matulino
- Danny Levi
- Sione Katoa

Upper Hutt Tigers

- Nelson Asofa-Solomona
- Jordan Pereira

Wellington Orcas

- Simon Mannering (New Zealand Warriors)
- Jahrome Hughes (Melbourne Storm)
