= Robert Henare =

New Zealand rugby league footballer

Personal information
- Full name: Robert Kopa Henare
- Born: 7 March 1978 (age 48) New Zealand

Playing information
- Position: Lock
Club
| Years | Team | Pld | T | G | FG | P |
|---|---|---|---|---|---|---|
| 1997 | St. George Dragons | 3 | 0 | 0 | 0 | 0 |
Representative
| Years | Team | Pld | T | G | FG | P |
| 1999 | New Zealand Māori |
- Source: RLP

Robert Henare (born 7 March 1978) is a New Zealand former rugby league footballer who played professionally for the St. George Dragons.

== Playing career ==
In 1996 Henare was a junior with the Illawarra Steelers and also captained the Junior Kiwis.

Henare spent 1997, 1998 and 1999 in Australia with the St. George Dragons where he played three first grade games.

In 2000 and 2001 he played in the Bartercard Cup with the Canterbury Bulls and was part of their 2000 Grand Final winning side.

In 2002 he played with the Port Kembla Blacks in the Illawarra Rugby League competition. He played well enough to rejoin the St George Illawarra Dragons in 2004 and played in the NSWRL Premier League.

== Representative career ==
Henare represented the New Zealand Māori in 1999. In 2001 he was picked for the South Island in a match against France.
