= Manurewa Marlins =

NZ rugby league club, based in Manurewa

Club information
- Full name: Manurewa Rugby League Football & Sports Club (Marlins)
- Nickname(s): Marlins
- Colours: Gold, Red & Black
- Founded: 1960
- Website: http://www.sporty.co.nz/manurewamarlins

Current details
- Ground(s): Mountfort Park (Jack Shelly Field); Leabank Park
- Chairman: Darrell Woodhouse
- Coach: James Hema & Neecrom Areaiiti
- Manager: Dan Pinn
- Captain: Mariota Mariota
- Competition: Auckland Rugby League

Records
- Premierships: 2005, 2007
- Roope Rooster: 1996
- Sharman Cup: 1996, 2006
- Kiwi Shield: 2005
- Nines: 2007

The Manurewa Marlins are a rugby league club based in Manurewa, New Zealand. In 2018 the Marlins will compete in Auckland Rugby League's Sharman Cup competition.

Between 2000 and 2003 they competed in the national Bartercard Cup competition.

== Notable players ==
Notable Former Players include Henry Fa'afili, Joe Galuvao, Greg Eastwood, Jesse Bromwich, Kenny Bromwich, Peta Hiku, Ligi Sao and Sitaleki Akauola.

Erin Clark who studied at Manurewa High school and has played for the New Zealand Warriors and the Gold Coast Titans.

Lance Hohaia and Mark Tookey also spent time at Manurewa whilst playing for the New Zealand Warriors in the NRL.

Another former NRL, Super League and Kiwi test representative who spent time at Manurewa was Richard Blackmore, who acted as a player/coach before moving to Ōtāhuhu, where he coached the Premier team from 2006–2010.

- Owen Wright
- Joe Galuvao (1998-2013 New Zealand Warriors, Penrith, South Sydney, Parramatta & Manly)
- Henry Fa'afili (2007-07 New Zealand Warriors & Warrington Wolves)
- Greg Eastwood (2005- Brisbane Broncos & Canterbury Bulldogs)
- Daniel O'Regan (2009 New Zealand Warriors)
- Jesse Bromwich (2010- Melbourne Storm)
- Kenny Bromwich (2013- Melbourne Storm)
- Sitaleki Akauola (2013- Wests Tigers & Penrith Panthers)
- Peter Hiku (2013- Manly Sea Eagles)
- Ligi Sao (2013- Manly Sea Eagles)
- Siliva Havili (2014- New Zealand Warriors)
- Ata Mariota (2022- Canberra Raiders)
- Neccrom Areaiiti
- Erin Clark (New Zealand Warriors and Gold Coast Titans)
- Salesi Foketi (2025- Sydney Roosters)

== Bartercard Cup ==
The Marlins played four season in the Bartercard cup, making the playoffs just once. They did however win in their first finals appearance, beating the Otahuhu Leopards, before going down against eventual runners up, the Eastern Tornadoes. In 2004 their place was taken by the Counties Manukau Jetz.

== Manurewa Senior Team Records (2000-03 +2022) ==
The season record for the most senior men’s team in the club.

Season	Grade	Name	Pld	W	D	L	PF	PA	PD	Pts	Position (Teams)
2000	Bartercard Cup	Manurewa Marlins	22	11	2	9	633	521	112	24	Seven (Twelve)
2001	Bartercard Cup	Manurewa Marlins	22	13	1	8	657	513	144	27	Fifth (Twelve), Lost Elimination Semifinal
2002	Bartercard Cup	Manurewa Marlins	16	5	1	10	377	511	-134	11	Eighth (Twelve)
2003	Bartercard Cup	Manurewa Marlins	16	6	1	9	480	544	-64	13	Seventh (Twelve)
2022	1st Grade (Fox Memorial)	Manurewa Marlins	8	1	0	7	132	286	-154	2	8th of 9 in sect. 1, L v Northcote 28-18 in champ prel final, L v Hibiscus Coast 34-10 in champ QF
2000-2003 +2022	TOTAL		84	36	5	43	2279	2375	-96	79	
