= Jared Mills =

New Zealand rugby league footballer

Personal information
- Full name: Jared Kyle Mills
- Born: 11 February 1976 (age 50) Whangārei, New Zealand

Playing information
- Height: 1.816 m (5 ft 11.5 in)
- Weight: 95 kg (15 st 0 lb)
- Position: Wing
Club
Years	Team	Pld	T	G	FG	P
1998–99	Western Suburbs	22	6	0	0	24
Representative
Years	Team	Pld	T	G	FG	P
1999–00	New Zealand Māori	2	0	0	0	0

Jared Kyle Mills (born 11 February 1975) is a former New Zealand professional rugby league footballer who represented Aotearoa Māori in the 2000 World Cup.

== Playing career ==
Mills played 22 first grade games for the Western Suburbs Magpies in 1998 and 1999. In 2000 he played for the Newtown Jets.

Mills first played for the New Zealand Māori in their one off match against Great Britain in 1999. He was then named part of the Aotearoa Māori squad for the 2000 World Cup, where he played in their match against Samoa.
