= Lusi Sione =

New Zealand rugby league footballer

Personal information
- Born: 26 December 1974 (age 50)

Playing information
- Position: Fullback
Club
Years	Team	Pld	T	G	FG	P
1995–96	Canterbury Country
2004–06	Workington Town
	Total	0	0	0	0	0

Lusi Sione is a New Zealand former professional rugby league footballer who played for Workington Town and represented the Canterbury and New Zealand 'A'.

== Playing career ==
Sione started his career in the Lion Red Cup, playing for the Canterbury Country Cardinals.

A Haswell Hornets club member, Sione represented New Zealand 'A' and played for the Canterbury Bulls in the Bartercard Cup, being part of the Bulls' grand final wins in 2000 and 2003.

He spent the 2002 season with Wellington, after following coach Gerard Stokes, but returned to Canterbury at the end of the year.

In 2004 he moved to England, playing for Workington Town. He spent two years in England and during this time trialled for the Super League club the Wigan Warriors. However, because Sione will not play on Saturday due to religious beliefs he was not signed. Sione won the 2004 overseas player of the year award. Sione returned to New Zealand when his working visa expired in 2006.

Sione returned to the Bartercard Cup in 2006, again making the New Zealand Residents side.
