= Jamie Cook (rugby league) =

New Zealand rugby league footballer

Personal information
- Full name: Jamie Cook

Playing information
- Position: Halfback, Hooker
Representative
Years	Team	Pld	T	G	FG	P
1999–02	New Zealand Māori	1	0	0	0	0

Jamie Cook is a former professional rugby league footballer who played as a hooker at the 2000 World Cup with the Aotearoa Māori side.

== Playing career ==
Cook played for the Northcote Tigers and Marist Richmond Brothers in the Bartercard Cup.

Cook represented the Aotearoa Māori side at the 2000 World Cup, playing in one match. He was again picked for New Zealand Māori in 2002, playing against Tonga.
