= Eastern Tornadoes =

Defunct NZ rugby league club, based near Auckland

Club information
- Full name: Eastern Manukau Tornadoes RLFC
- Founded: 1999
- Exited: 2006; 20 years ago

Former details
- Ground: Ericsson No. 2
- Competition: Bartercard Cup

Records
- Runners-up: 2001

The Eastern Tornadoes were a New Zealand rugby league franchise that competed in the New Zealand Rugby League's Bartercard Cup and Auckland Rugby League's Super 12 competitions. They were formed to represent the rugby league clubs of East Auckland.

== History ==
The Eastern Tornadoes were formed in 1999 to compete in the Auckland Rugby League's Super 12 competition. They were a merger of the Mt Wellington, Otara and Pakuranga senior sides.

In 2000 they joined the new national Bartercard Cup competition. The team originally included players from the Ellerslie Eagles but in 2004 they joined the Otahuhu Leopards to form the Otahuhu Ellerslie Leopards, being replaced by the Manurewa Marlins. In 2006 the competition was revamped and they were merged with the Otahuhu Ellerslie Leopards to form the Tamaki Leopards.

== Notable players ==
Notable players included: Jeremiah Pai, Gary Tupou, Herewini Rangi, Zebastian Lucky Luisi, David and Paul Fisiiahi and Hare Te Rangi.

They were coached by James Leuluai.

== Bartercard Cup ==
The team was always a force in the early years, losing the Grand Final in 2001. However, in 2004 and 2005 the club was a shadow of its former self and failed to qualify for the playoffs.

Season	Pld	W	D	L	PF	PA	PD	Pts	Position (Teams)	Finals
2000	22	15	0	7	584	516	68	30	Third (Twelve)	Lost Elimination Semifinal
2001	21	13	3	5	641	490	151	31*	Second (Twelve)	Lost Grand Final
2002	16	10	0	6	512	465	47	20	Fourth (Twelve)	Lost Elimination Play-off
2003	16	11	1	4	675	381	294	23	Fifth (Twelve)	Lost Elimination Semifinal
2004	16	6	1	9	378	584	-206	13	Eighth (Twelve)	N/A
2005	16	3	1	12	339	558	-219	7	Eleventh (Twelve)	N/A

*Two points for a bye awarded as the Ngongotaha Chiefs left the competition.
