= Hibiscus Coast Raiders =

NZ rugby league club, based in Hibiscus Coast

Club information
- Full name: Hibiscus Coast Raiders Rugby League & Sports Club
- Colours: maroon, gold and white
- Founded: 1982; 44 years ago

Current details
- Ground: Stanmore Bay Reserve
- Coach: Herman David
- Competition: Auckland Rugby League

Records
- Premierships: 2002
- Bartercard Cup: 2001
- Roope Rooster: 2003
- Phelan Shield: 2006, 2012

The Hibiscus Coast Raiders are a rugby league club based on the Hibiscus Coast, New Zealand. They compete in Auckland Rugby League's Fox Memorial competition and between 2000 and 2005 were also involved in the Bartercard Cup competition.

== History ==
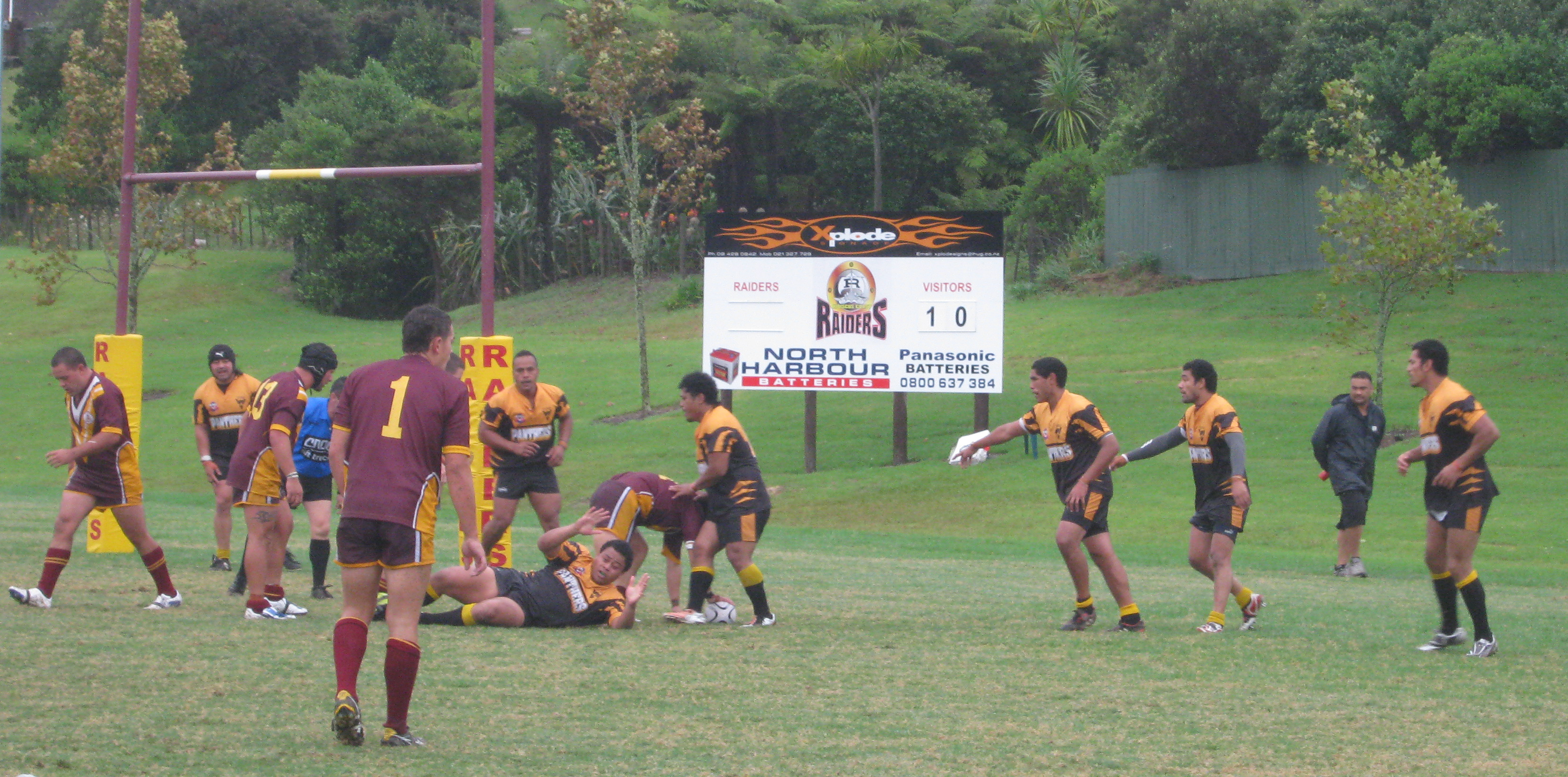
The Raiders play Papatoetoe at Stanmore Bay Reserve

The club was formed in 1982 by a group of players that included former Kiwi Ken Stirling.

In 1997 the club moved from its original location at Edith Hopper Park to Stanmore Bay Reserve.

Before Brian McClennan took over as coach in the late 1990s they were a third division side, but the club enjoyed success and growth to the point where in 1998, the Premiers won the Northern Regional Cup and we were invited to move up into the Fox Memorial Tournament. They were then invited to be part of the New Zealand Rugby League's new Bartercard Cup in 2000 and the club won the 2001 Bartercard Cup.

== Bartercard Cup ==
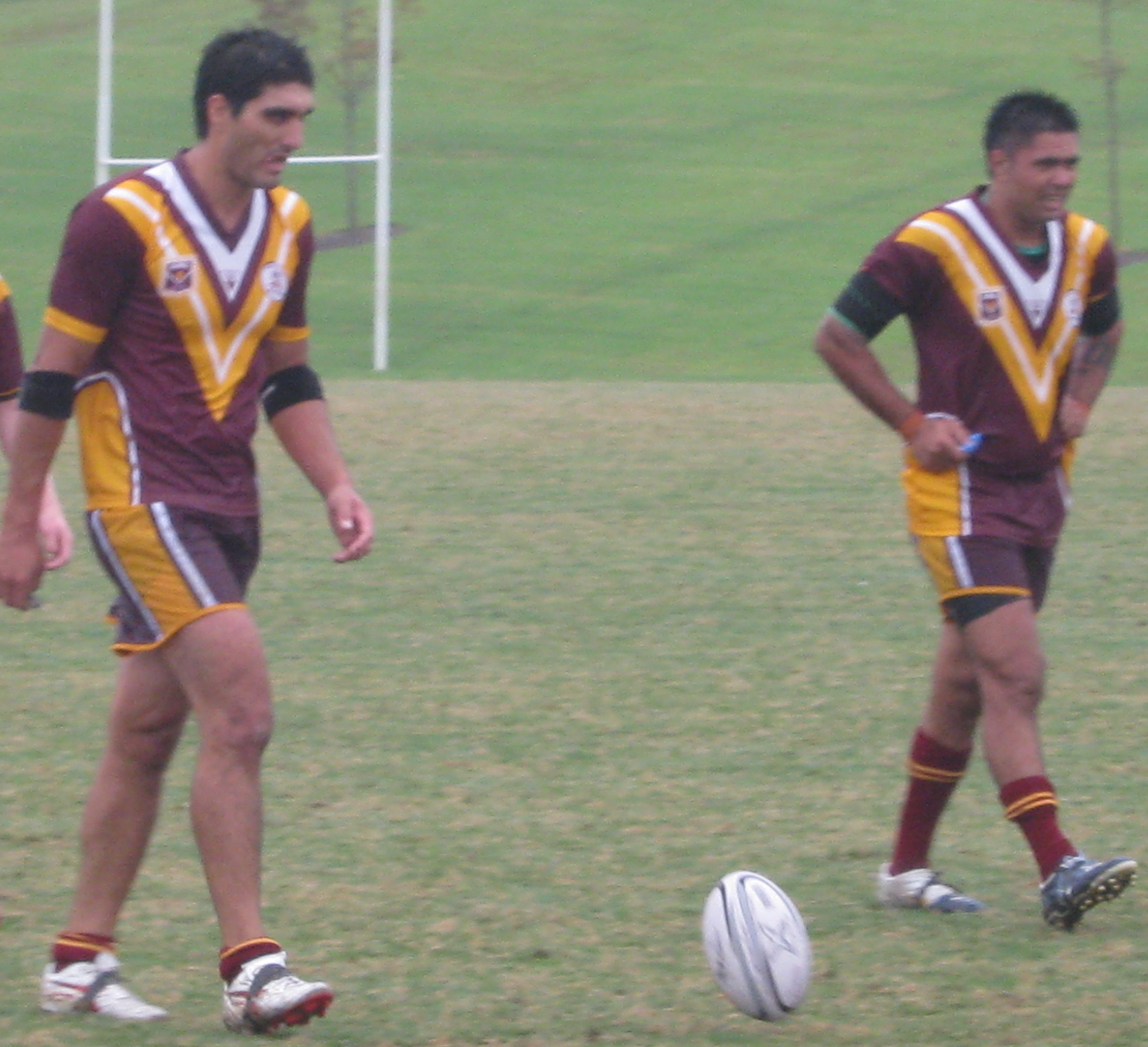
The Raiders 2011 uniform

The Raiders were invited to be part of the inaugural Bartercard Cup in 2000 and competed in the competition until they were replaced by Harbour League in 2006. Harbour League represented all of the North Shore clubs.

The Raiders missed out on a top five spot in their debut year but turned things around so much in 2001 that they dominated the competition, winning the Grand Final. They made the Grand Final again in 2002, losing to the Mt Albert Lions. They were never a major threat in the competition after this however, either bowing out in the first round or not making the play-offs at all. In a way they were a victim of their own success, many players were bought up into the New Zealand Warriors squad and their coach was headhunted by Mt Albert.

== Hibiscus Coast Senior Team Records (2000-03 +2022) ==
The season record for the most senior men’s team in the club.

| Season | Grade | Name | Pld | W | D | L | PF | PA | PD | Pts | Position (Teams) |
|---|---|---|---|---|---|---|---|---|---|---|---|
| 2000 | Bartercard Cup | Hibiscus Coast | 22 | 7 | 5 | 10 | 544 | 578 | -34 | 19 | 8th of 12 |
| 2001 | Bartercard Cup | Hibiscus Coast | 21 | 16 | 1 | 4 | 742 | 425 | 317 | 35* | Champions, 2pts awarded for bye due to Ngongotaha Chiefs leaving comp |
| 2002 | Bartercard Cup | Hibiscus Coast | 16 | 11 | 0 | 5 | 536 | 377 | 159 | 22 | 2nd of 12, lost grand final |
| 2003 | Bartercard Cup | Hibiscus Coast | 16 | 12 | 0 | 4 | 573 | 319 | 254 | 24 | 4th of 12, lost elimination play off |
| 2004 | Bartercard Cup | Hibiscus Coast | 16 | 3 | 0 | 13 | 266 | 503 | -237 | 6 | last of 12 |
| 2005 | Bartercard Cup | Hibiscus Coast | 16 | 9 | 2 | 5 | 512 | 362 | 150 | 20 | 5th of 12, lost elimination play off (Twelve) |
| 2022 | 1st Grade (Fox Memorial) | Hibiscus Coast | 8 | 1 | 0 | 7 | 110 | 320 | -210 | 2 | 9th of 9 in sect. 1, W v Manurewa 34-10 in champ QF, L v Pakuranga in champ SF |
| 2000-2005 +2022 | TOTAL | | 115 | 59 | 8 | 48 | 3305 | 2850 | 455 | 126 | |

== Notable players ==
Notable former players include; Shannon Stowers, Daniel Floyd, Karl Temata, Aaron Heremaia, Ben Te'o, Iafeta Paleaaesina, Odell Manuel and Shaun Johnson.

== Life members ==
In 2011 the Raiders appointed the club's first two life members; administrators Ces Moyle and Owen Kirby.
