= Ngongotaha Chiefs =

NZ rugby league club, based in Rotorua, Bay of Plenty

Club information
- Full name: Ngongotaha Rugby League
- Founded: 1938; 88 years ago
- Website: ngongotaharugbyleague.com

Current details
- Ground: Puketewhero Park
- Competition: Bay of Plenty Rugby League

The Ngongotaha Chiefs are a New Zealand rugby league club. They are from Rotorua in the Bay of Plenty. In 2000 and 2001 they competed in the Bartercard Cup but now they compete in the Bay of Plenty Rugby League competition.

== Notable players ==
Over the years the club has seen many talented players but the most famous name associated with the club would be the Orchard brothers; Robert, Phillip, Eddie and John. Robert and Phillip represented NZ, Phillip has recently been inducted into the NZRL Hall Of Fame.

== Bartercard Cup ==
The Chiefs took part in the 2000 and 2001 Bartercard Cup competitions. In 2000 they won four games, enough to finish above the Porirua Pumas. However, in 2001 they were not at all competitive, losing the first sixteen games convincingly. After this, they pulled out of the competition and did not compete in the final six rounds.

Season	Pld	W	D	L	PF	PA	PD	Pts	Position (Teams)
2000	22	4	0	18	424	685	-261	8	Eleventh (Twelve)
2001	16	0	0	16	282	1000	-718	0	Twelfth (Twelve)
