= Otahuhu Leopards =

New Zealand rugby league club, based in Ōtāhuhu

Club information
- Full name: Otahuhu Rovers Rugby League Football Club
- Nickname: Leopards
- Founded: 1911; 115 years ago
- Website: otahuhuroversrugbyleague.co.nz

Current details
- Competition: Auckland Rugby League, New Zealand Rugby League

Records
- Premierships: (14) 1945, 1964, 1970, 1971, 1975, 1977, 1978, 1983, 1990, 1995, 2000, 2010, 2025, 2026
- Runners-up: (14) 1958, 1967, 1973, 1979, 1980, 1982, 1984, 1991, 1994, 1996, 1999, 2002, 2008, 2011
- Minor premierships: (18) 1942, 1945, 1964, 1966, 1969, 1971, 1975, 1977, 1978, 1979, 1984, 1994, 1996, 2008, 2009, 2010, 2025, 2026
- National Club Champions: 1964, 1983
- Roope Rooster: 1957, 1965, 1967, 1970, 1974, 1975, 1977, 1981, 1982, 1987, 1994, 2009, 2010, 2025, 2026
- Stormont Shield: 1965, 1971, 1975, 1977, 1978, 1982, 1984, 1988, 1994, 1995, 1996, 2010, 2012, 2026
- Sharman Cup: 1935, 1938, 1939, 1940, 1941, 1950, 2017
- Stallard Cup: 1925

The Otahuhu Leopards are a rugby league club based in Ōtāhuhu, Auckland. Founded in 1911, the club has produced 49 New Zealand national rugby league team players. The club competes in the Fox Memorial competition run by Auckland Rugby League. Otahuhu has won the Fox Memorial Shield 12 times, the Rukatai Shield 16 times, Roope Rooster 12 times and the Stormont Shield 12 times.

== History ==
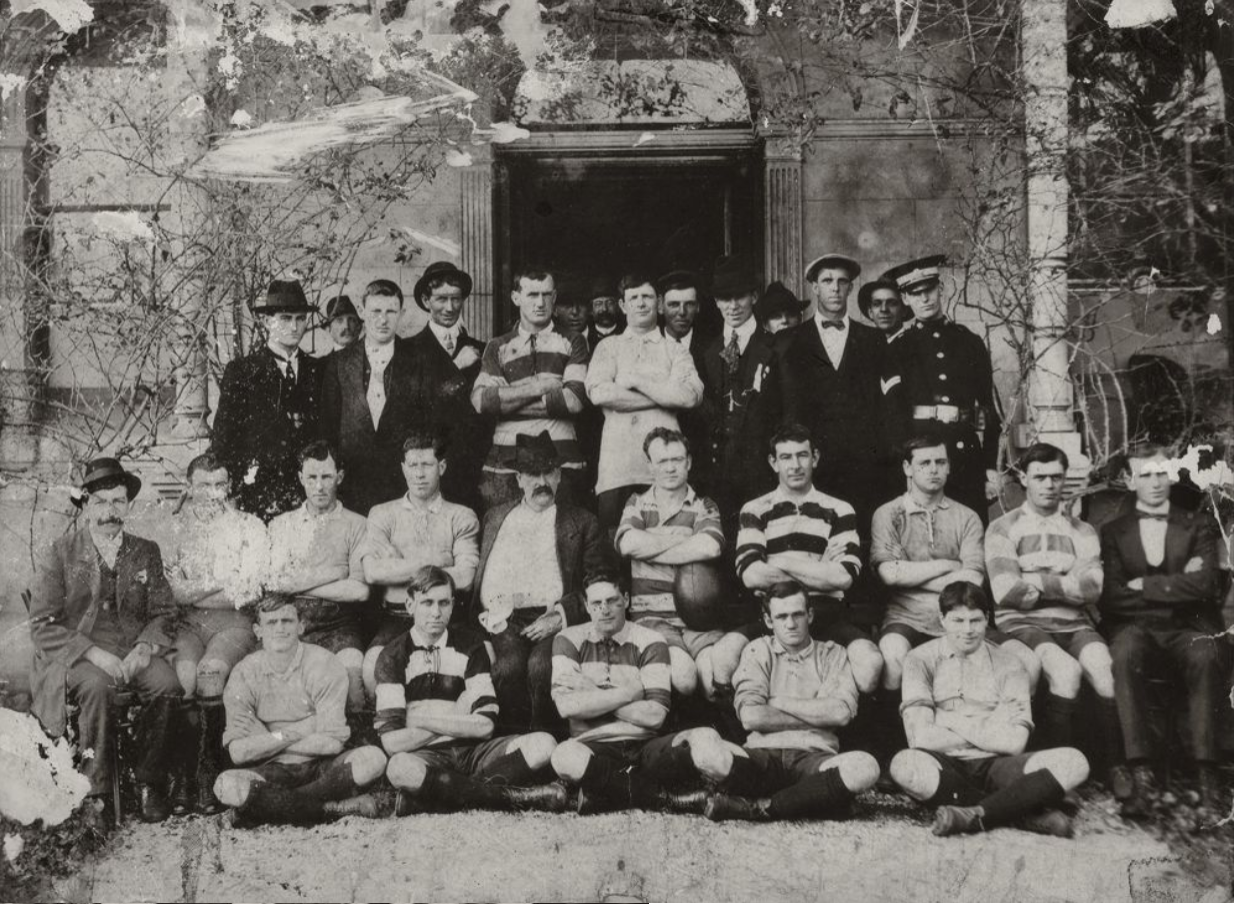
Otahuhu second grade team in 1915.

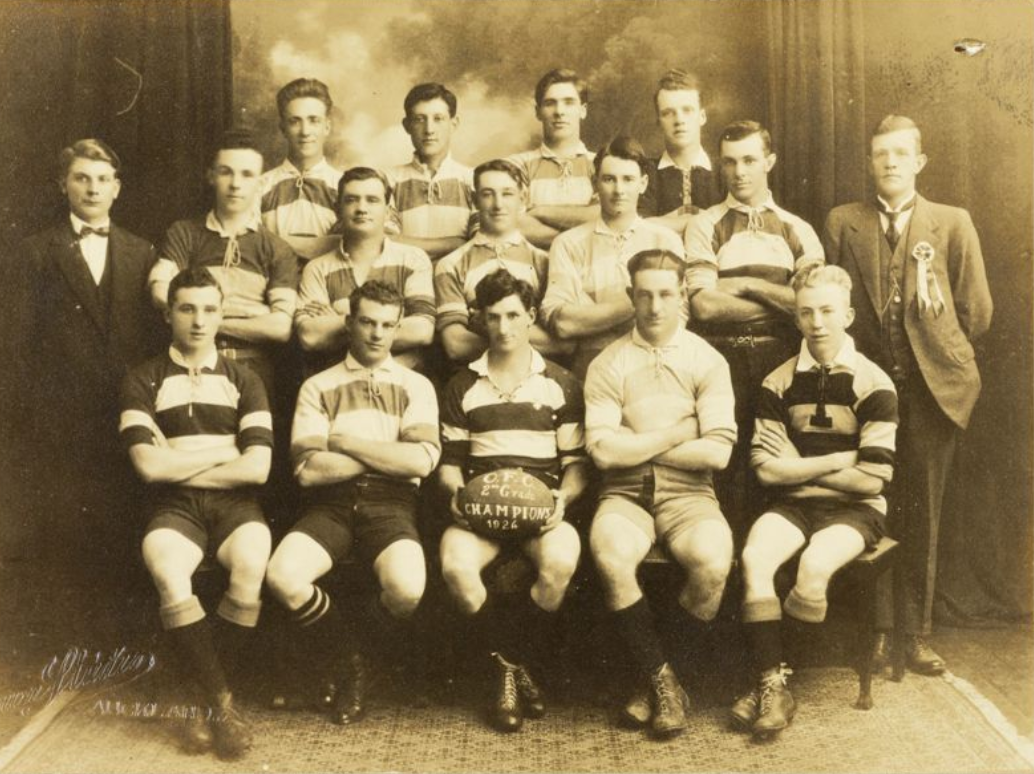
Otahuhu 1924 second grade champions

The Otahuhu Leopards were founded in 1911. Their first ever Kiwi was selected in 1914 when Arthur Hardgrave played against the touring England side. He had joined Otahuhu at the start of the season after the Manukau side he was with had dropped out of first grade the season prior.

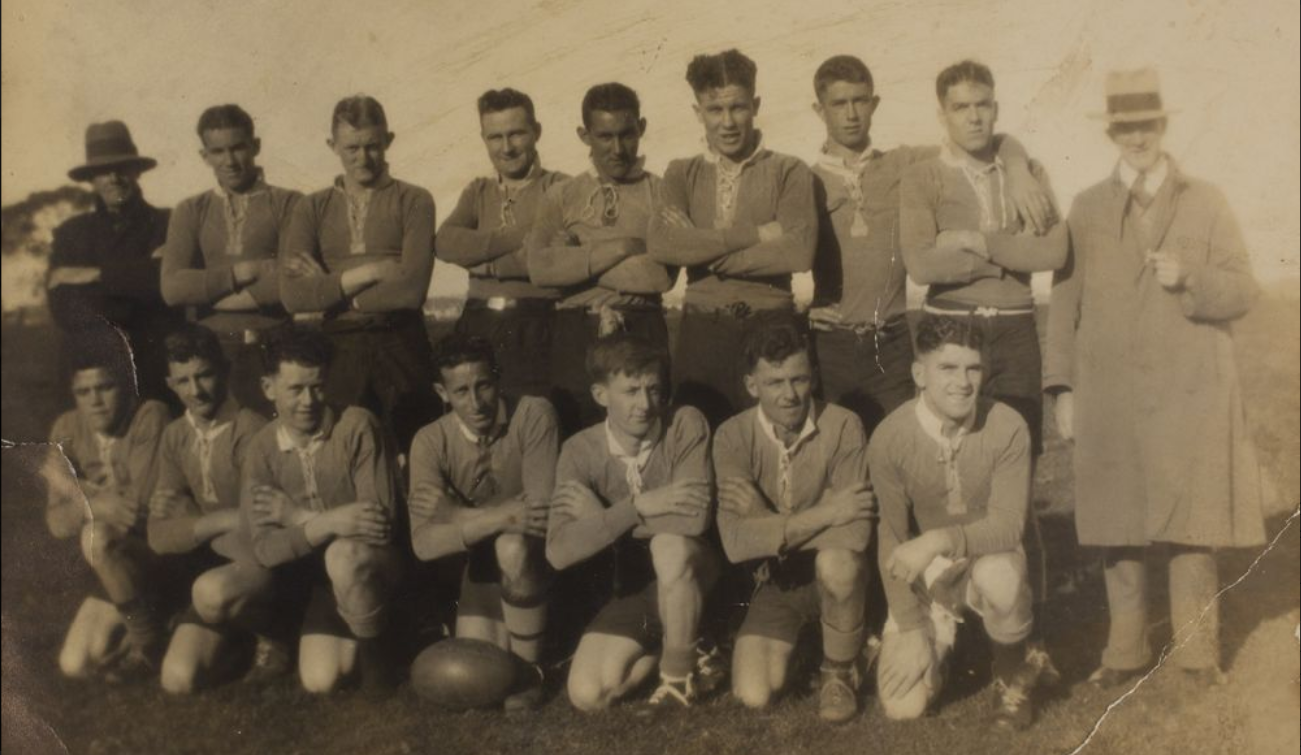
1934 second grade champions.

1930 saw the club win its first ever senior grade trophy when their top side won the Senior B competition. In 1943, playing in blue and white, Otahuhu produced their first Fox Memorial side though they had played as a combined City Rovers-Otahuhu side in the Fox Memorial competition in 1942 due to there being so many players away at World War II. The Auckland Rugby League forced several mergers for that season. By 1945 Otahuhu had won their first Fox Memorial title. In that year the team featured four brothers Ivan, Joffre, Mick, and Norm Johnson, along with brothers Dick and Jim Fogarty (also captain), and Royce and J. Speedy. Their main point scorer was Colin Riley who was the leading goal kicker in the competition in 1944 and 1945. In 1947 their first Kiwi's were selected since Arthur Hardgrave in 1914. They were Joffre Johnson and Claude Hancox who toured Britain and France in 1947–48.

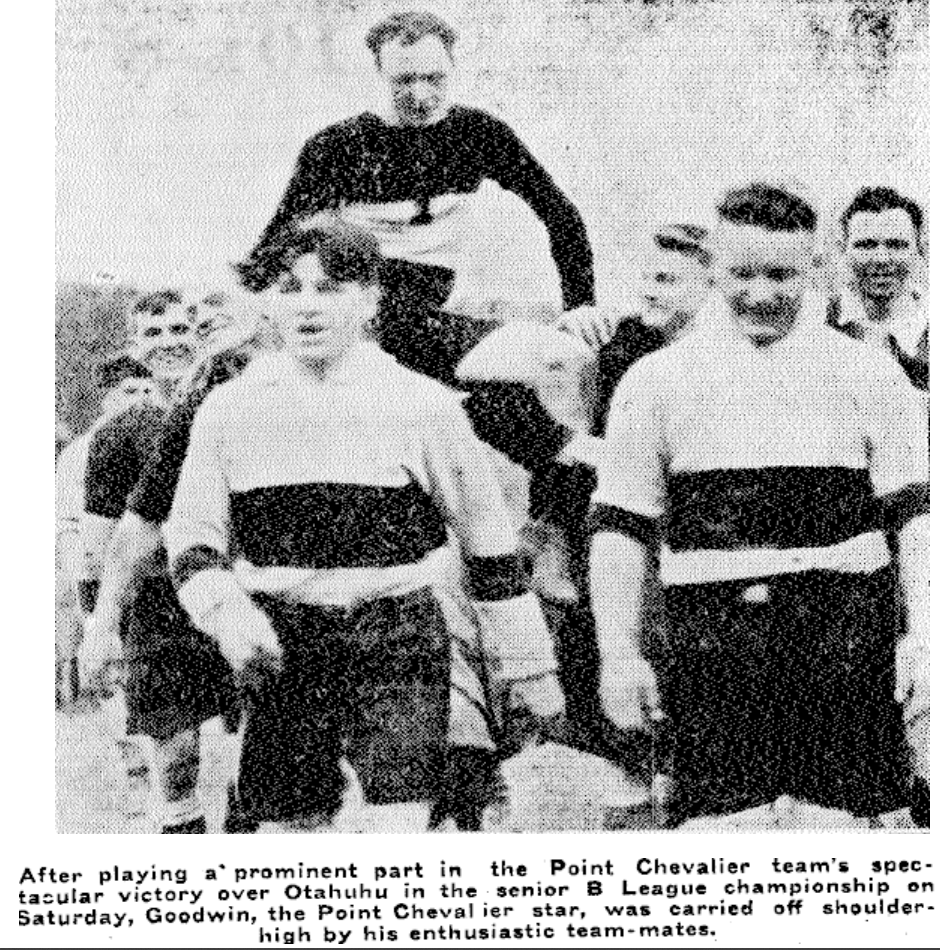

Otahuhu Leopards is where Kiwi coach Graham Lowe first made a name for himself coaching U18s in 1974 and becoming a first grade coach in 1977, winning the Fox Memorial competition in his first year.

=== Bartercard Cup ===
With the creation of the Bartercard Cup in 2000 by the New Zealand Rugby League the Leopards were one of the seven Auckland sides invited to join. They dominated the competition in the inaugural season, finishing up Minor Premiers before going down to the Canterbury Bulls in the Grand Final. More heartbreak was to follow for the club, losing in the Elimination Play-off and the Preliminary Final the next two seasons before missing the final series all together in 2003.

=== Otahuhu Ellerslie Leopards ===
In 2004 the Counties Manukau Jetz replaced the Manurewa Marlins in the competition. As a result, the number of clubs involved with the Eastern Tornadoes increased and the clubs orientation shifted southwards. The Ellerslie Eagles left this franchise and joined with Otahuhu to form the Otahuhu Ellerslie Leopards. The club made the finals again, again losing in the Preliminary Final. In 2005 the club missed the finals for the second time in three seasons.

=== Tamaki Leopards ===
In 2006 the number of Auckland Bartercard Cup sides was reduced from eight to five. This resulted in the Otahuhu-Ellerslie Leopards and the Eastern Tornadoes merging to form the Tamaki Leopards franchise. In 2007 the side was renamed the Tamaki Titans and finished fifth.

=== Fox Memorial ===
The club competes in the Fox Memorial competition run by Auckland Rugby League. Otahuhu has won the Fox Memorial Shield 12 times, the Rukatai Shield 16 times, Roope Rooster 12 times and the Stormont Shield 12 times.

As a junior, Richard Blackmore who started his rugby league at Otahuhu became head coach from 2006 to 2010 successfully taking ownership of the Stormont Shield and Roope Rooster and leading the team to a Fox Memorial grand final victory over Mt Albert in 2010.

== Notable players ==
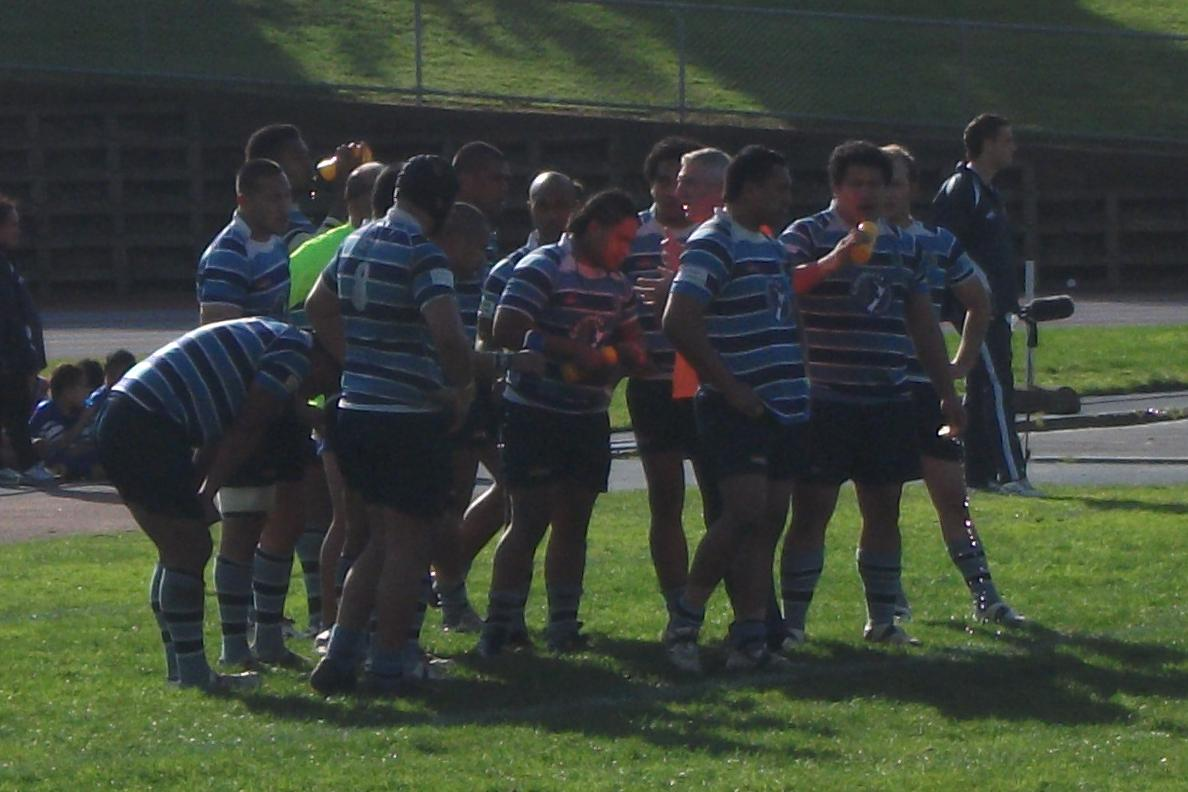
Otahuhu in the 2010 grand final

The Otahuhu Club has a history of skilled rugby league players.

=== Kiwi Captains ===
To date the Leopards have produced five captains of the New Zealand national rugby league team:

- Roy Christian (1970–1972)
- Mark Graham (1980–1986)
- Hugh McGahan (1985–1990)
- Richard Barnett (1999–2000)
- Ruben Wiki (2003–2005)

=== Other players ===
- Arthur Hardgrave – debuted in 1914
- Bill Cloke – debuted in 1917
- Leeson Ah Mau
- Tawera Nikau – debuted in 1989
- Manu Vatuvei – debuted in 2005
- Thomas Leuluai – debuted in 2003
- Clinton Toopi – debuted in 2001
- Sam Kasiano – debuted in 2012
- Frank Paul Nuuausala – debuted in 2009
- Elijah Taylor – debuted in 2011
- Roger Tuivasa-Sheck – debuted in 2013
- George Carmont – debuted in 2004
- Cooper Vuna – debuted in 2004
- Motootua Gray – debuted in 2001

== Season records ==
=== Otahuhu Senior Team Records (1912–1945, 1990–2007, 2022–26) ===
The season record for the most senior men’s team in the club.

Season	Grade	Team	Play	W	D	L	PF	PA	PD	Pts	Position (Teams)
1912	2nd Grade	Otahuhu Rovers	9	6	0	3	94	51	43	12	Approx 2nd of 8 (incomplete records)
1913	2nd Grade	Otahuhu Rovers	9	7	1	1	76	37	39	15	2nd of 7
1914	1st Grade (Myers Cup)	Otahuhu Rovers	9	1	1	7	64	115	−51	3	6th of 6
1915	1st Grade	Otahuhu Rovers	9	1	0	8	48	111	−63	2	6th of 6
1916	1st Grade	Otahuhu Rovers	10	2	1	7	62	175	−113	5	5th of 6
1917	1st Grade	Otahuhu Rovers	4	0	0	4	12	55	−43	0	6th of 6 (withdrew after R4 default)
1918	2nd Grade	Otahuhu Rovers	2	2	0	0	28	0	28	4	1st of 5, full results unknown
1919	1st Grade	Otahuhu Rovers	1	0	0	1	3	28	−25	0	8th of 8 (withdrew after R1)
1920	4th Grade	Otahuhu Rovers	4	2	1	1	33	13	20	5	Approximately 4th of 10, full results unknown
1921	2nd Grade	Otahuhu Rovers	4	2	0	2	18	24	−6	4	Approximately 3rd of 10, full results unknown
1922	2nd Grade	Otahuhu Rovers	2	1	0	2	15	5	9	2	Approximately 9th of 13, full results unknown
1923	2nd Grade	Otahuhu Rovers	14	7	0	6	35	17	+18	14	Approximately 3rd of 12, full results unknown
1924	2nd Grade	Otahuhu Rovers	4	4	0	0	60	16	44	8	1st of 12, lost KO final v Kingsland 3–6
1925	B Division	Otahuhu Rovers	11	6	1	4	85	48	+37	13	2nd of 5
1926	B Division	Otahuhu Rovers	14	4	2	8	68	124	−56	10	5th of 6
1927	B Division	Otahuhu Rovers	12	2	0	9	63	123	−60	4	7th of 7
1928	B Division	Otahuhu Rovers	12	7	1	4	123	115	+8	15	2nd of 7
1929	B Division	Otahuhu Rovers	11	8	1	2	223	44	+179	17	2nd of 6
1930	B Division	Otahuhu Rovers	13	11	1	1	183	81	+102	23	1st of 7
1931	1st Grade (Fox)	Otahuhu-Ellerslie	12	1	1	10	85	237	−152	3	7th of 7 (combined side with Ellerslie)
1932	2nd Grade	Otahuhu Rovers	17	12	0	5	89	54	35	24	2nd of 9 (lost final to Papakura 2–5, lost KO final 11–2 to Māngere United)
1933	2nd Grade	Otahuhu Rovers	12	9	1	2	130	42	88	19	2nd of 7 (lost final to Māngere United 8–11)
1934	2nd Grade	Otahuhu Rovers	14	11	2	1	82	34	48	24	1st of 6
1935	Sen. B (Sharman)	Otahuhu Rovers	9	8	0	1	135	16	+119	16	1st of 4
1936	Sen. B (Sharman)	Otahuhu Rovers	8	5	0	3	77	67	+10	10	2nd of 5
1937	3rd Grade	Otahuhu Rovers	-	-	-	-	-	-	-	-	1st of 13 (won final over Richmond 13–6)
1938	Sen. B (Sharman)	Otahuhu Rovers	12	9	1	2	85	61	+24	19	1st of 6
1939	Sen. B (Sharman)	Otahuhu Rovers	8	6	1	1	83	21	+62	13	1st of 6
1940	Sen. B (Sharman)	Otahuhu Rovers	9	7	0	2	105	54	+51	14	1st of 5
1941	Sen. B (Sharman)	Otahuhu Rovers	7	7	0	0	97	26	+71	14	1st of 9, Roope Rooster: W v Papakura 25–5, L v City 13–12, Phelan Shield: L v Richmond 18–14
1942	1st Grade (Fox)	City-Otahuhu	15	10	0	5	247	132	115	20	2nd of 6 (combined side with City due to loss of players during WW2)
1943	1st Grade (Fox)	Otahuhu Rovers	15	4	2	9	122	204	−82	10	6th of 9
1944	1st Grade (Fox)	Otahuhu Rovers	18	10	0	8	222	159	63	20	7th of 10
1945	1st Grade (Fox)	Otahuhu Rovers	14	11	1	2	266	103	163	23	1st of 10
	Playoffs	Otahuhu Rovers	2	1	0	1	29	33			L 18–28 v Ponsonby in Major SF, W 11–5 v Richmond in Major Championship Final
1990	Lion Red Prem	Otahuhu Leopards	21	11	0	10	484	336	132.2	22	3rd of 8
	Playoffs	Otahuhu Leopards	3	3	0	0	67	32			W v 39–18 Glenora in SF, W v Northcote, W 28–14 v Te Atatū in GF
1991	Lion Red Prem	Otahuhu Leopards	18	12	2	4	492	307	160.3	26	2nd of 10
	Playoffs	Otahuhu Leopards	3	1	0	2	-	-	-		
1992	Lion Red Prem	Otahuhu Leopards	-	-	-	-	-	-	-	-	
1993	Lion Red Prem	Otahuhu Leopards	18	8	2	8	359	357	100.6	18	6th of 10
1994	Lion Red Prem	Otahuhu Leopards	22	16	1	5	561	464	120.9	33	1st of 12
	Playoffs	Otahuhu Leopards	3	1	0	2	46	52			L 10–20 v Northcote, W 24–0 v Hibiscus Coast, L 12–32 v Northcote
1995	Lion Red Prem	Otahuhu Leopards	24	18	1	5	814	457	178.1	41	2nd of 13
	Playoffs	Otahuhu Leopards	1	1	0	0	32	0			W 32–0 v Marist in the Grand Final
1996	Lion Red Prel	Otahuhu Leopards	13	9	1	3	392	211	185.8	19	3rd of 14
	Lion Red Rukutai Shield	Otahuhu Leopards	7	6	0	1	182	108	168.5	12	1st of 8
	Playoffs	Otahuhu Leopards	1	0	0	1	28	36			L 28–36 v Otara in GF after triple over time
1997	Lion Red Super 10	Otahuhu Leopards	18	12	0	6	631	381	165.6	24	2nd of 10
	Playoffs	Otahuhu Leopards	-	-	-	-	-	-			
1998	Super 10	Otahuhu Leopards	18	9	0	9	501	485	103.3	18	5th of 10
1999	Rukutai Shield Super 12	Otahuhu Leopards	22	15	0	7	737	455	162	30	4th of 12
2000	Mad Butcher Fox Memorial Top 8	Otahuhu Leopards	14	11	2	1	589	216	272.7	24	2nd of 8
	Playoffs	Otahuhu Leopards	2	2	0	0	47	24			W 26–10 v Richmond in minor SF, W 21–14 v Richmond in GF
2001	Mad Butcher Fox Memorial Top 8	Otahuhu Leopards	14	8	0	6	390	408	95.6	16	5th of 8
	Playoffs	Otahuhu Leopards	3	2	0	1	62	66			W 32–28 v Manukau in prelim SF, W 16–10 v Ponsonby in minor SF, L 14–28 v Northcote in major SF
2002	Fox Memorial Top 8	Otahuhu Leopards	14	9	0	5	402	337	119.3	18	3rd of 8
	Playoffs	Otahuhu Leopards	4	2	0	2	98	129			L 10–42 v Hib. Coast in prelim SF, W 22–19 v Marist in minor SF, W 26–24 v Papakura in major SF, L 40–44 v Hib. Coast in GF in double extra time
2004	Mad Butcher Fox Memorial	Otahuhu Leopards	14	2	1	11	378	586	64.51	5	8th of 8
2000	Bartercard Cup	Otahuhu Leopards	22	18	0	4	782	440	342	36	1st of 12, L v Canterbury Bulls in the GF
2001	Bartercard Cup	Otahuhu Leopards	22	14	1	7	691	528	163	29	4th of 12, lost elimination play off
2002	Bartercard Cup	Otahuhu Leopards	16	10	0	6	636	393	243	20	3rd of 12, lost preliminary final
2003	Bartercard Cup	Otahuhu Leopards	16	5	1	10	432	594	−162	11	
2004	Bartercard Cup	Otahuhu Ellerslie Leopards	16	12	0	4	476	321	155	24	2nd of 12
2005	Bartercard Cup	Otahuhu Ellerslie Leopards	19	9	0	7	442	412	30	18	6th of 12
2006	Bartercard Cup	Tamaki Leopards	18	9	2	7	546	440	106	20	
2007	Bartercard Cup	Tamaki Titans	18	10	1	7	526	464	62	21	5th of 10
2022	1st Grade, (Fox Memorial)	Otahuhu Leopards	9	8	0	1	504	140	364	16	2nd of 9 in sect. 2, W v Richmond 20–12 in Fox QF, L v Glenora in Fox SF
	Playoffs	Otahuhu Leopards	2	1	0	1	38	38	0		W 20–12 v Richmond in QF, L 18–26 v Glenora in SF
2023	Fox Memorial Qualifying	Otahuhu Leopards	3	3	0	0	96	62	154.8	6	1st of 4
	Fox Memorial Premiership	Otahuhu Leopards	11	7	0	4	368	128	287.5	14	5th of 12
	Playoffs	Otahuhu Leopards	1	0	0	1	10	14			L 10–14 v Papakura in QF
2024	Fox Memorial Qualifying	Otahuhu Leopards	3	3	0	0	116	28	-	6	1st of 4
	Fox Memorial	Otahuhu Leopards	11	7	0	4	340	239	-	14	4th of 10
	Fox Memorial Playoffs	Otahuhu Leopards	1	0	0	1	16	23	-	0	L v Pt Chevalier 16-23
2025	Fox Memorial Qualifying	Otahuhu Leopards	3	3	0	0	272	10	-	6	1st of 4
	Fox Memorial	Otahuhu Leopards	12	12	0	0	522	88	-	24	1st of 12
	Fox Memorial Playoffs	Otahuhu Leopards	2	2	0	0	29	18	11	-	W v Papakura 21-14 in SF, W v Mt Albert 8-4 in the GF
2026	Fox Memorial Premiership	Otahuhu Leopards	14	14	0	0	576	138	+438	28	1st of 8
	Fox Memorial Playoffs	Otahuhu Leopards	2	2	0	0	74	28	+46	-	W v Manukau 44-12 in Maj. SF, W v Mt Albert 20-16 in GF
1912–45, 1990–2007, 2022–2026	TOTAL	-	804	491	34	275	17930	12448	+5482	984	

== Club titles (1912–43) ==
21 championship titles

- 1913 Fourth Grade
- 1916 Second Grade
- 1918 Second Grade and Fifth Grade
- 1921 Fourth Grade
- 1924 Second Grade
- 1926 Schoolboys (Senior)
- 1927 Schoolboys (Senior)
- 1930 B Division (Norton Cup)
- 1934 Second Grade (Wright Cup)
- 1935 Senior B (Sharman Cup)
- 1936 Seventh Grade
- 1937 Third Grade and Fifth Grade
- 1938 Senior B (Sharman Cup)
- 1939 Senior B (Sharman Cup) and Third Grade (Open)
- 1940 Senior B (Sharman Cup) and Third Grade (Open)
- 1941 Senior B (Sharman Cup) and Third Grade (Open)

=== All time top point scorers (1914–17, 1919, 1931, 1941–45) ===
The point scoring lists are compiled from matches played in matches from the first grade championship, the Roope Rooster, Phelan Shield, and Sharman Cup only. One off matches and exhibition matches are not included. The matches and point scorers includes the combined Otahuhu-Ellerslie side of 1931, and the combined Otahuhu-City side of 1942.

Top point scorers
No	Player	Start	End	Games	Tries	Con	Pen	DG	Mark	Pts
1	Colin Riley	1943	1945	56	3	87	42	0	0	267
2	Alan Donovan	1942	-	17	8	25	12	1	0	100
3	Ray Halsey	1942	1945	58	29	0	0	0	0	87
4=	K Simons	1942	1945	52	23	0	0	0	0	69
4=	Cliff Wellm	1943	1945	34	23	0	0	0	0	69
6	Jimmy Mullins	1941	1944	36	4	15	12	0	0	66
7	John (Jack) Speedy	1943	1945	61	17	1	2	0	0	57
8	Mick Johnson	1942	1945	43	17	0	0	0	0	51
9	Hugh Brady	1944	1945	22	11	3	5	0	0	49
10	Norm Johnson	1942	1945	61	11	0	0	0	0	33
11	George Cook	1914	-	7	7	2	2	0	0	29
12	Bernard Farrelly	1915	1916	21	0	4	8	0	1	26
13=	Royce Speedy	1945	-	11	7	0	0	0	0	21
13=	John Fischer	1915	1916	18	7	0	0	0	0	21
13=	Jim Fogarty	1944	1945	34	7	0	0	0	0	21
16=	C.W. Allen	1941	1945	15	2	3	4	0	0	20
16=	R Keat	1944	1945	22	6	0	1	0	0	20
18	Arthur Hardgrave	1914	1916	15	2	0	6	0	0	18
19=	Stan Webb	1931	-	11	3	0	4	0	0	17
19=	A Hickey	1931	-	14	5	0	1	0	0	17
21	R Seymour	1945	-	14	4	1	1	0	0	16
22=	Kenneth Finlayson	1941	1943	19	5	0	0	0	0	15
22=	Joffre Johnson	1942	1945	29	5	0	0	0	0	15

=== Head to Head records all time ===
Opponent	Start	End	Games	Wins	Draws	Losses	For	Against	
Grafton Athletic	1914	1916	6	1	0	5	30	76	-46
Kingsland Rovers	1925	1928	11	3	0	8	72	14	-69
Māngere United	1925	1930	17	13	0	3	199	73	+73
Parnell	1926	1930	13	8	0	5	175	85	+90
Kingsland Rovers	1928	-	4	1	0	3	43	59	-16
TOTAL			10	5	0	5	0	69	78
