= Bartercard Cup =

2000–2007 rugby league competition in New Zealand

- Sport: Rugby league
- Inaugural season: 2000
- Ceased: 2007
- Replaced by: Bartercard Premiership
- Number of teams: 10
- Country: New Zealand
- Last Premiers: Auckland Lions (2007)
- Most titles: Mount Albert Lions (3 titles)
- Website: leaguenet.co.nz

The Bartercard Cup (successor of the Lion Red Cup) was the top level rugby league club competition in New Zealand from 2000 until 2007. For the entire life of the tournament it was sponsored by Bartercard. The cup was administered by the New Zealand Rugby League. The tournament was discontinued by the NZRL in 2007 and was replaced by the Bartercard Premiership in 2008.

== Franchises ==
The format of the competition changed several times over the life of the competition and in total 24 clubs or franchises competed. In the first season half of the clubs were from Auckland but as the competition went on more and more franchises represented the provinces. The Canterbury Bulls were the only franchise to compete in every season.

Club	Seasons	Premiers	Runners-Up	Minor Premiers	Wooden Spoon
Auckland Lions	2006–2007	2		2
Tamaki Titans	2006–2007
Waitakere Rangers	2006–2007
Northern Storm	2006–2007				1
Canterbury Bulls	2000–2007	2	2	1
Central Falcons	2002–2007				1
Wellington Orcas	2002–2007
Waicoa Bay Stallions	2004–2007				1
Harbour League	2006–2007		1
Counties Manukau Jetz	2004–2007
Hibiscus Coast Raiders	2000–2005	1	1	1	1
Northcote Tigers	2000–2002
North Harbour Tigers	2003–2005
Glenora Bears	2000–2005
Mt Albert Lions	2000–2005	3		2
Marist Richmond Brothers	2000–2005		2	1
Otahuhu Leopards	2000–2003		1	1
Otahuhu Ellerslie Leopards	2004–2005
Eastern Tornadoes	2000–2005		1
Manurewa Marlins	2000–2003
Ngongotaha Chiefs	2000–2001				1
Taranaki Wildcats	2002–2003				2
Porirua Pumas	2000–2001				1
Wainuiomata Lions	2000–2001

== Seasons ==
Year	Champions	Score	Score	Defeated	Minor Premiers	Wooden Spoon
2000	Canterbury Bulls	38	24	Otahuhu Leopards	Otahuhu Leopards	Porirua Pumas
2001	Hibiscus Coast Raiders	28	18	Eastern Tornadoes	Hibiscus Coast Raiders	Ngongotaha Chiefs
2002	Mt Albert Lions	24	20	Hibiscus Coast Raiders	Mt Albert Lions	Taranaki Wildcats
2003	Canterbury Bulls	32	28	Marist Richmond Brothers	Canterbury Bulls	Taranaki Wildcats
2004	Mt Albert Lions	40	20	Marist Richmond Brothers	Marist Richmond Brothers	Hibiscus Coast Raiders
2005	Mt Albert Lions	24	20	Canterbury Bulls	Mt Albert Lions	Waicoa Bay Stallions
2006	Auckland Lions	25	18	Canterbury Bulls	Auckland Lions	Northern Storm
2007	Auckland Lions	28	4	Harbour League	Auckland Lions	Central Falcons

== See also ==
- New Zealand Rugby League
- Rugby league in New Zealand
