= 1995 Trans-Tasman Test series =

Rugby League

The 1995 Trans-Tasman Test series was an international rugby league, three test series played in Australia between the Australian Kangaroos and New Zealand national rugby league team. As the series was played in the middle of the 1995 ARL season and most of the Kiwis selected came from Australian Rugby League (ARL) clubs, New Zealand did not play in any tour matches while in Australia (of their first test team, only Lock forward Brendon Tuuta (Featherstone Rovers) and reserve back Henry Paul (Wigan) were playing for non-ARL clubs), but prior to the series against Australia they had a two test home series against France.

The series was shrouded in controversy due to the ARL's refusal to select Super League (SL) aligned players to play for the Kangaroos, due to the Super League war. However, ARL loyal players playing for SL aligned clubs were still eligible for selection while the ARL did not stand in the way of New Zealand selecting SL loyal players from the ARL premiership.

== Australia ==
The Kangaroos, coached by Bob Fulton in his 7th year in charge of the national team, and coming off their successful 1994 Kangaroo Tour, were clouded with controversy due to the ARL's stance on SL players in the wake of the Super League War. 1994 Kangaroo test players such as Brett Mullins, Laurie Daley, Ricky Stuart, Steve Walters and Bradley Clyde (Canberra) and Brisbane Broncos players Michael Hancock, Steve Renouf, Allan Langer, Glenn Lazarus and Kevin Walters, along with Cronulla's Andrew Ettingshausen, Manly-Warringah's Ian Roberts and Canterbury-Bankstown's Dean Pay, were ruled ineligible to play representative football (though Pay would be one of four Bulldogs players to go back on their SL contracts and re-join the ARL, thus he was eligible and selected for the World Cup at the end of the 1995 ARL season). Stuart was a central figure in the controversy, with the ARL trying to entice the test halfback to their side with a promise of the Australian captaincy should he stick with the establishment (the Kangaroos captaincy being vacant as Mal Meninga had retired at the end of the Kangaroo Tour). However, Stuart ultimately decided to stick with both Canberra and the Super League.

The stance by the ARL also ruled the SL players out of the 1995 State of Origin series, won 3-0 by the underdog Queenslanders, coached by former Qld and Manly premiership winning captain, Paul "Fatty" Vautin, in his first coaching role after being part of Channel 9's league commentary team since his retirement at the end of 1991. Despite Qld's series whitewash, the make up of the Kangaroos first test team saw an even spread with eight Queenslander's and seven New South Welshmen selected.

With the SL players missing, eleven players were on debut for the Kangaroos for the first test in Brisbane with only fullback Tim Brasher, winger Rod Wishart and five-eighth Brad Fittler keeping their places in the team from the one that defeated France 74-0 in the last game of the Kangaroo Tour (Wishart remained on the wing, new captain Brad Fittler moved from lock to five-eight and Brasher moved from being the utility back on the bench to starting fullback). The eleven players on test debut were - winger Brett Dallas (Canterbury-Bankstown), centres Mark Coyne (St. George) and Terry Hill (Manly-Warringah), hooker Wayne Bartrim (St. George), second-rowers Steve Menzies (Manly) and Gary Larson (North Sydney), and lock Jason Smith (Canterbury-Bankstown), plus all four reserves Trevor Gillmeister (South Queensland), Adam Muir (Newcastle), Danny Moore (Manly) and Robbie O'Davis (Newcastle). Of the eleven, only Hill, Menzies and Smith were members of the 1994 Kangaroo Tour. The match represented the most test debuts in one game for Australia since the mid-season series against the Kiwis in 1978. In addition, Matt Sing (Penrith), 1994 Kangaroo tourist Jim Serdaris (Western Suburbs), Matthew Johns and Jamie Ainscough (both Newcastle), all made their Test debut over the series. Reserve forward and Qld captain Trevor Gillmeister became the oldest forward to make his test debut for Australia at the age of 31.

Following the retirement of Mal Meninga, Penrith's 14 test veteran and NSW captain, Brad Fittler, was installed as Australia's new test captain. At just 23 years of age, Fittler became Australia's youngest test captain since Reg Gasnier captained Australia against Great Britain in the 1962 Ashes series at the age of 22. Fittler, the youngest ever Kangaroo Tourist when chosen for the 1990 Kangaroo Tour at age 18 years and 229 days, and in his last year with Penrith before joining the Sydney City Roosters in 1996, became the first Panthers junior to ever captain his country.

== New Zealand ==
New Zealand were coached by Frank Endacott, who had been in charge since replacing Howie Tamati following the 1993 season. New Zealand were fresh from an unimpressive two test series win (one win, one draw) against France played in New Zealand prior to the three test series against the Kangaroos. Captaining his country was Canberra's tough prop-forward John Lomax, who had been given the captaincy for the series against France at the expense of long time captain Gary Freeman. Lomax however was injured early in the first test against Australia at Suncorp Stadium, ruling him out for 10 weeks and the captaincy fell to Freeman for the rest of the game and series. With Freeman and Australian captain Brad Fittler both playing for Penrith at the time, it was the first time the opposing test captains had come from the same club.

As the New Zealand Rugby League was aligned with the Super League, they were free to select Super League aligned players. Despite the ARL's stance on Australia's SL players, they did not stand in the way of SL aligned players playing in the ARL premiership being selected for New Zealand. This included the selection of in-form goal kicking fullback Matthew Ridge, who played with the ARL-loyal Manly-Warringah who were coached by Australian coach and ARL power-broker Bob Fulton. New Zealand went into the first test with an unchanged line up from their 16-all second test draw with the un-fancied French at Palmerston North.

The New Zealand squad for the three match tour was; John Lomax (c), Gary Freeman (c), Richard Blackmore, Logan Edwards, Syd Eru, Daryl Halligan, Sean Hoppe, Tony Iro, Stephen Kearney, Jason Lowrie, Jarrod McCracken, Gene Ngamu, Henry Paul, Quentin Pongia, Matthew Ridge, Brent Stuart, Tony Tatupu, John Timu, Tony Tuimavave, Brendon Tuuta, Ruben Wiki and Jason Williams.

== First Test ==
23 June 1995

Australia	26 – 8	New Zealand
Tries: Brett Dallas (2); Terry Hill; Adam Muir; Goals: Rod Wishart (5/5)		Tries: Stephen Kearney Goals: Matthew Ridge (2/2)

Suncorp-Metway Stadium, Brisbane
Attendance: 25,309
Referee: Dennis Hale (New Zealand)
Player of the Match: Mark Carroll

Australia	New Zealand

FB	1	Tim Brasher
RW	2	Brett Dallas
RC	3	Mark Coyne
LC	4	Terry Hill
LW	5	Rod Wishart
FE	6	Brad Fittler (c)
HB	7	Geoff Toovey
PR	8	Mark Carroll
HK	9	Wayne Bartrim
PR	10	David Gillespie
SR	11	Steve Menzies
SR	12	Gary Larson
LF	13	Jason Smith
Substitutions:
IC	14	Trevor Gillmeister
IC	15	Adam Muir
IC	16	Danny Moore
IC	17	Robbie O'Davis
Coach:
(Australia) Bob Fulton

FB	1	Matthew Ridge
LW	2	Sean Hoppe
RC	3	Jarrod McCracken
LC	4	Richie Blackmore
RW	5	Jason Williams
FE	6	Gene Ngamu
HB	7	Gary Freeman
PR	8	John Lomax (c)
HK	9	Syd Eru
PR	10	Brent Stuart
SR	11	Quentin Pongia
SR	12	Stephen Kearney
LK	13	Brendon Tuuta
Substitutions:
IC	14	Jason Lowrie
IC	15	Henry Paul
IC	16	Logan Edwards
IC	17	Daryl Halligan
Coach:
(New Zealand) Frank Endacott

With eleven players on debut, and three players who hadn't played a test in 2 years (David Gillespie), 4 years (Geoff Toovey) and 5 years (Mark Carroll) respectively, the Kangaroos had what most publicly believed to be a 'second string' side and opinions were divided on their chances against New Zealand, despite the Kiwis' less than convincing test series performance against France. Indeed, many critics were predicting the Kiwis first series win over Australia since 1952. Only four Kiwis, Jarrod McCracken, Richie Blackmore, Jason Williams and Gary Freeman, had played in their last test win over Australia in the first test of the 1991 Trans-Tasman series.

Someone forgot to tell Bob Fulton's charges that they were supposed to be a second-string side as they dismantled the Kiwis with four tries to one with all players scoring for Australia being on debut. Brett Dallas scored a double while Terry Hill and Adam Muir added their own. Rod Wishart had a perfect night with the boot, kicking 5/5, as did NZ fullback Matthew Ridge, who landed 2/2, including conversion of his side's only try scored by Stephen Kearney.

Brett Dallas left former test players in shock, including 19 test veteran Steve "Blocker" Roach who interviewed him immediately after the game for television broadcaster Channel 9, when he swapped his debut test jumper with that of his Canterbury-Bankstown team mate, Kiwi winger Jason Williams, at the end of the game. Dallas confessed to being unaware of a long-standing tradition of keeping your debut test jumper, rather than swap it for one from an opposition player.

== Second Test ==
Injuries forced two changes to the Australian back line. After some inspirational performances on the flank for Queensland, Penrith's Matt Sing come in for the injured Brett Dallas, while Danny Moore replaced his injured Manly team mate Terry Hill in the centres. Onto the bench to make his test debut was Newcastle Five-eighth Matthew Johns, while 1994 Kangaroo Tourists Paul Harragon and Greg Florimo earned themselves a test recall. For New Zealand, 26 test All Black veteran John Timu made his rugby league test debut becoming New Zealand's 34th dual-rugby international.

7 July 1995

Australia	20 – 10	New Zealand
Tries: Wayne Bartrim; Steve Menzies; Goals: Rod Wishart (5/5); Field Goal(s); Greg Florimo (1); Brad Fittler (1)		Tries: Sean Hoppe Goals: Matthew Ridge (3/3)

Sydney Football Stadium, Sydney
Attendance: 27,568
Referee: Phil Houston (New Zealand)
Player of the Match: Brad Fittler

Australia	New Zealand

FB	1	Tim Brasher
RW	2	Matt Sing
RC	3	Mark Coyne
LC	4	Danny Moore
LW	5	Rod Wishart
FE	6	Brad Fittler (c)
HB	7	Geoff Toovey
PR	8	Mark Carroll
HK	9	Wayne Bartrim
PR	10	David Gillespie
SR	11	Steve Menzies
SR	12	Gary Larson
LF	13	Jason Smith
Substitutions:
IC	14	Paul Harragon
IC	15	Greg Florimo
IC	16	Matthew Johns
IC	17	Trevor Gillmeister
Coach:
(Australia) Bob Fulton

FB	1	Matthew Ridge
LW	2	Sean Hoppe
RC	3	Jarrod McCracken
LC	4	Ruben Wiki
RW	5	Henry Paul
FE	6	Gene Ngamu
HB	7	Gary Freeman (c)
PR	8	Jason Lowrie
HK	9	Syd Eru
PR	10	Quentin Pongia
SR	11	Tony Tatupu
SR	12	Tony Iro
LK	13	Brendon Tuuta
Substitutions:
IC	14	Brent Stuart
IC	15	Tony Tuimavave
IC	16	John Timu
IC	17	Daryl Halligan
Coach:
(New Zealand) Frank Endacott

Australia won the test 20-10 win over a gallant Kiwi side in the second test in Sydney in front of a healthy crowd of 27,568. The first half, which saw a 10-all scoreline after tries to Wayne Bartrim (Australia) and Sean Hoppe (NZ) plus 3 goals each to Wishart and Ridge, was halted a couple of minutes early due to an ambulance on the ground in the south-west corner of the Sydney Football Stadium to tend to a spectator who was taken to hospital with a suspected heart attack.

Manly-Warringah's prolific try scoring second rower Steve Menzies scored the only try in the second half (and his first in test football) with Wishart contributing another two goals taking his tally to 10/10 for the series. Australian captain Brad Fittler and replacement Greg Florimo each kicked a field goal to lift the home side to a 20-10 win with Australia wrapping up the series 2-0.

By wrapping up the series in Sydney, the Kangaroos kept alive their series winning streak (not including one-off tests) over New Zealand. Australia had not lost a test series to the Kiwis since 1952.

== Third Test ==
Injuries forced changes to both line ups for the third test in Brisbane, while Australia had two more players on debut, 1994 Kangaroo hooker Jim Serdaris (Western Suburbs) and replacement outside back Jamie Ainscough (Newcastle).

14 July 1995

Australia	46 – 10	New Zealand
Tries: Steve Menzies (2); Jamie Ainscough; David Gillespie; Paul Harragon; Billy Moore; Robbie O'Davis; Rod Wishart; Goals: Rod Wishart (7/9)		Tries: Gene Ngamu Goals: Matthew Ridge (2/3); Daryl Halligan (1/1)

Suncorp-Metway Stadium, Brisbane
Attendance: 20,803
Referee: Phil Houston (New Zealand)
Player of the Match: Tim Brasher

Australia	New Zealand

FB	1	Tim Brasher
RW	2	Robbie O'Davis
RC	3	Greg Florimo
LC	4	Danny Moore
LW	5	Rod Wishart
FE	6	Brad Fittler (c)
HB	7	Geoff Toovey
PR	8	Mark Carroll
HK	9	Jim Serdaris
PR	10	David Gillespie
SR	11	Steve Menzies
SR	12	Gary Larson
LF	13	Jason Smith
Substitutions:
IC	14	Paul Harragon
IC	15	Jamie Ainscough
IC	16	Trevor Gillmeister
IC	17	Matthew Johns
Coach:
(Australia) Bob Fulton

FB	1	Matthew Ridge
LW	2	Sean Hoppe
RC	3	Jarrod McCracken
LC	4	Ruben Wiki
RW	5	Henry Paul
FE	6	Gene Ngamu
HB	7	Gary Freeman (c)
PR	8	Jason Lowrie
HK	9	Syd Eru
PR	10	Quentin Pongia
SR	11	Stephen Kearney
SR	12	Tony Iro
LK	13	Tony Tatupu
Substitutions:
IC	14	Daryl Halligan
IC	15	Brent Stuart
IC	16	Brendon Tuuta
IC	17	John Timu
Coach:
(New Zealand) Frank Endacott

New Zealand did well to hold Australia and only be down 10–6 at half time after losing fullback Matthew Ridge who was concussed trying to tackle powerful Australian winger Rod Wishart. In a brave act, Ridge had put his body on the line to stop a flying Wishart, and while coming off second best after hitting his head on Wishart's thigh, he did stop the Steelers winger from scoring. The Kiwis lost nothing in goal kicking though with Canterbury-Bankstown sharp shooter Daryl Halligan came on to the wing to replace Ridge, and Wigan utility back Henry Paul moving from the wing to fullback. What they lost was Ridge's experience and directional orders to the defensive line and it showed in the second half as Australia ran in 6 tries to nil to run out 46–10 winners and take the Trans-Tasman Test series 3-0.

== Aftermath ==
Both sides were preparing for the 1995 World Cup. Before leaving for the World Cup New Zealand played the New Zealand Residents XIII at Ericsson Stadium and defeated them 20-4.

At the World Cup, New Zealand topped their pool (despite some lackluster performances and almost losing to Tonga in a boilover at Warrington), while Australia finished second in Pool A. The two teams met the Semi-finals at the McAlpine Stadium in Huddersfield, with Australia winning 30-20 after extra time after the scores had been locked 20-all at the end of the regulation 80 minutes.

The Australian's, still minus the Super League players, would go on to defeat England 16-8 in the World Cup Final at London's Wembley Stadium. The Kangaroos made the final the hard way, losing the tournament's opening game to England at Wembley, and finally after defeating New Zealand 30-20 after extra-time in the Semi-finals. The Australian SL players, led by Canberra's Daley, Stuart, Clyde, Walters and Mullins, won a court order against the ARL making SL players eligible for representative games. However, despite assurances from the ARL that all players were considered, it came as no surprise when only ARL loyal players made the Kangaroos World Cup squad. As one unnamed ARL official allegedly said, the court decision only forced the ARL to consider Super League players, not select them. It remains unknown how many, if any, SL players were actually considered for World Cup selection.

New Zealand would next defeat Australia in the 1998 ANZAC Test and not defeat them in a series until the winning the final of the 2005 Tri-Nations 24-0 at Elland Road in Leeds. The 2005 Tri-Nations win by New Zealand brought to an end Australia's 52 year series win streak over the Kiwis. New Zealand had not defeated Australia in a series (not including one-off tests) since 1952.

== See also ==
Australian national rugby league team
New Zealand national rugby league team
Australia vs New Zealand in rugby league
