= 1993 Trans-Tasman Test series =

Rugby League Test Series

The 1993 Trans-Tasman Test series was an international rugby league test series played in Australia between Australia and New Zealand. The series, which started on 20 June in Auckland and finished on 30 June in Brisbane, consisted of three test matches. The three Tests attracted a total of 74,494 fans. Due to sponsorship, the series was known as the Lion Red Test Series.

The Test series was broadcast into Australia via the Seven Network with commentary provided by Graeme Hughes, Graham Lowe and John Monie with recently retired former Australian dual-rugby international Michael O'Connor the sideline reporter.

== Australia ==
The Australians, coached by Bob Fulton, had been crowned Rugby League World Cup champions for the 7th time after winning the 1992 Rugby League World Cup final at Wembley Stadium. Mal Meninga captained the side in the final two tests of the Trans-Tasman series but was forced to miss the first test after being suspended by the NSWRL for the use of an elbow on Manly-Warringah's Welsh import centre John Devereux in a club game. Ironically, Manly's coach was also Australian coach Bob Fulton. The captaincy for the first test fell to Meninga's Canberra Raiders team mate and New South Wales captain Laurie Daley.

The test series took place following the 1993 State of Origin series which was won by NSW. Dale Shearer's performances at fullback for Qld saw him earn a test recall in front of well performed World Cup and NSW fullback Tim Brasher (though Shearer had been selected at centre for all 3 Ashes series tests in 1992 but withdrew from all 3 with injury). Bradley Clyde, who had not played in the Origin series due to injury was also recalled to the team.

== New Zealand ==
The Kiwis, coached by Howie Tamati and captained by Gary Freeman had lost their 1992 home series against the touring Great Britain Lions. New Zealand would be without their goal kicking fullback Matthew Ridge who had suffered a season ending knee injury in a club game for Manly-Warringah, but would lack for nothing in goal kicking thanks to the presence of North Sydney Bears superboot winger Daryl Halligan as well as Canterbury-Bankstown's goal kicking forward Gavin Hill.

== First Test ==
Australia went into the game without regular captain Mal Meninga who had been suspended for 2 games. It would be the first test Meninga had missed since 1988. With Meninga out, the captaincy for the test was handed to NSW captain, Meninga's Canberra Raiders team mate Laurie Daley. Dale Shearer made his return to test football after starring at fullback for Queensland in the final 2 games of the State of Origin series to beat out well performed New South Wales and 1992 World Cup final fullback Tim Brasher. The Kiwis were captained by veteran halfback Gary Freeman, but would be without goal kicking dual-rugby international fullback Matthew Ridge who had suffered a season ending knee injury playing for the Bob Fulton coached Manly-Warringah in a Winfield Cup game with coach Howie Tamati handing the #1 jumper to Balmain's utility back Morvin Edwards. Despite the loss of Ridge, the Kiwis lost nothing in goal kicking with the selection of North Sydney Bears winger Daryl Halligan.

The Australians created history with the selection of all three Walters brothers, five-eighth Kevin, hooker Steve and reserve hooker Kerrod for the test, though Kerrod Walters did not get off the bench.

20 June 1993

New Zealand	14 – 14	Australia
Tries: Sean Hoppe (2) Goals: Daryl Halligan (3/3)		Tries: Dale Shearer; Steve Walters; Goals: Dale Shearer (2/2); Field Goals: Laurie Daley (2)

Mt Smart Stadium, Auckland
Attendance: 22,994
Referee: Russell Smith (England)
Player of the Match: Sean Hoppe

New Zealand	Australia

FB	1	Morvin Edwards
LW	2	Sean Hoppe
RC	3	Jarrod McCracken
LC	4	Dave Watson
RW	5	Daryl Halligan
FE	6	Tea Ropati
HB	7	Gary Freeman (c)
PR	8	Se'e Solomona
HK	9	Duane Mann
PR	10	Brent Todd
SR	11	Gary Mercer
SR	12	Quentin Pongia
LK	13	Tawera Nikau
Substitutions:
IC	14	Tony Kemp
IC	15	Brendon Tuuta
IC	16	Jason Donnelly
IC	17	John Lomax
Coach:
(New Zealand) Howie Tamati

FB	1	Dale Shearer
LW	2	Michael Hancock
RC	3	Laurie Daley (c)
LC	4	Brad Fittler
RW	5	Willie Carne
FE	6	Kevin Walters
HB	7	Allan Langer
PR	8	Glenn Lazarus
HK	9	Steve Walters
PR	10	Paul Harragon
SR	11	Paul Sironen
SR	12	Bob Lindner
LF	13	Bradley Clyde
Substitutions:
IC	14	Ian Roberts
IC	15	Kerrod Walters
IC	16	Brad Mackay
IC	17	Steve Renouf
Coach:
(Australia) Bob Fulton

The first test at Auckland's Mt Smart Stadium almost produced a shock result. After three first half goals from Daryl Halligan and two tries from winger Sean Hoppe, one an intercept off a Dale Shearer pass that saw him race 80 metres and out-pace Shearer and Willie Carne, the Kiwis led 14-13 at half time. The Australians scored two tries next to the posts through both Shearer and Steve Walters (who scored with only seconds left in the half) with Shearer easily kicking both conversions, while a field goal from Laurie Daley after Shearers try gave the Australians a 7-2 lead until Hoppe's first try.

Midway through the first half, English referee Russell Smith earned the ire of the Australians when he ignored a Gary Mercer spear tackle on Bradley Clyde, then on the next tackle also ignored a high tackle by Tawera Nikau on Paul Harragon which caused the Australian front rower to lose the ball with Smith ruling a knock-on. Smith also denied both sides what looked to be legitimate tries with Steve Walters denied one in the first half following a dart from the dummy half, and replacement Kiwi forward John Lomax denied in the second half despite television replays showing that he clearly got the ball down on the Australian line.

The second half was scoreless until the 77th minute when a cool under pressure Laurie Daley (who had already missed one attempt to tie the scores) slotted his second field goal to salvage a 14-all draw for the reigning World Champions.

== Second Test ==
The Australians made several changes to their line up for the second test. Captain Mal Meninga returned from suspension with Laurie Daley moved from the centres to 5/8 in place of Kevin Walters who moved to the bench at the expense of his brother and Brisbane Broncos team mate Kerrod Walters. Ian Roberts was ruled out with injury with David Gillespie replacing him on the bench while Andrew Ettingshausen returned to the side on the bench in place of Steve Renouf. The only change made by New Zealand coach Howie Tamati was promoting Tony Kemp to start at 5/8 with Tea Ropati dropping to the bench.

25 June 1993

New Zealand	8 – 16	Australia
Tries: Gary Freeman Goals: Daryl Halligan (2)		Tries: Bradley Clyde; Willie Carne; Michael Hancock; Goals: Dale Shearer (2)

Palmerston North Showgrounds, Palmerston North
Attendance: 19,500
Referee: Russell Smith (England)
Player of the Match: Bradley Clyde

New Zealand	Australia

FB	1	Morvin Edwards
LW	2	Sean Hoppe
RC	3	Jarrod McCracken
LC	4	Dave Watson
RW	5	Daryl Halligan
FE	6	Tony Kemp
HB	7	Gary Freeman (c)
PR	8	Se'e Solomona
HK	9	Duane Mann
PR	10	Brent Todd
SR	11	Gary Mercer
SR	12	Quentin Pongia
LK	13	Tawera Nikau
Substitutions:
IC	14	Tea Ropati
IC	15	John Lomax
IC	16	Brendon Tuuta
IC	17	Jason Donnelly
Coach:
(New Zealand) Howie Tamati

FB	1	Dale Shearer
LW	2	Michael Hancock
RC	3	Mal Meninga (c)
LC	4	Brad Fittler
RW	5	Willie Carne
FE	6	Laurie Daley
HB	7	Allan Langer
PR	8	Glenn Lazarus
HK	9	Steve Walters
PR	10	Paul Harragon
SR	11	Paul Sironen
SR	12	Bob Lindner
LF	13	Bradley Clyde
Substitutions:
IC	14	David Gillespie
IC	15	Kevin Walters
IC	16	Brad Mackay
IC	17	Andrew Ettingshausen
Coach:
(Australia) Bob Fulton

After a day of torrential rain, the second test was played on a very wet Palmerston North Showgrounds. The overflow crowd of 19,500 were allowed onto the speedway track (a blunder by the organisers who actually sold more tickets than the venue was licensed to hold), and close to the pitch. A number of times in the second half play was halted as a result of balls being lost in the crowd which had been souvenired by spectators. This (at one stage in the second half the game was held up for almost 5 minutes while a replacement ball was located), and the conditions prompted rival captains Garry Freeman and Mal Meninga to appeal to English referee Russell Smith to actually abandon the game. However, the game continued and the Australia's eventually took a 1-0 lead in the series with a 16-8 win.

== Third Test ==
Australia's series win extended their series streak over New Zealand to 40 years with the Kangaroos not having lost a test series to the Kiwis since 1952.

30 June 1993

Australia	16 – 4	New Zealand
Tries: Brad Fittler; Michael Hancock; Mal Meninga; Goals: Dale Shearer (2)		Tries: Goals: Gavin Hill (2)

Lang Park, Brisbane
Attendance: 32,000
Referee: Russell Smith (England)
Player of the Match: Laurie Daley

Australia	New Zealand

FB	1	Dale Shearer
LW	2	Michael Hancock
RC	3	Mal Meninga (c)
LC	4	Brad Fittler
RW	5	Willie Carne
FE	6	Laurie Daley
HB	7	Allan Langer
PR	8	Glenn Lazarus
HK	9	Steve Walters
PR	10	Paul Harragon
SR	11	Paul Sironen
SR	12	Bob Lindner
LF	13	Bradley Clyde
Substitutions:
IC	14	David Gillespie
IC	15	Andrew Ettingshausen
IC	16	Kevin Walters
IC	17	Ian Roberts
Coach:
(Australia) Bob Fulton

FB	1	Morvin Edwards
RW	2	Sean Hoppe
RC	3	Jarrod McCracken
LC	4	Dave Watson
LW	5	Jason Donnelly
FE	6	Tony Kemp
HB	7	Gary Freeman (c)
PR	8	Gavin Hill
HK	9	Duane Mann
PR	10	Brent Todd
SR	11	Gary Mercer
SR	12	Brendon Tuuta
LK	13	Tawera Nikau
Substitutions:
IC	14	Stephen Kearney
IC	15	John Lomax
IC	16	Tea Ropati
IC	17	Daryl Halligan
Coach:
(New Zealand) Howie Tamati

The only test match played in Australia in 1993 saw some 32,000 turn out at Lang Park in Brisbane to see Australia wrap up the Trans-Tasman series 2-0. Scoring three times themselves, the Kangaroos kept their line intact to run out 16-4 winners and send retiring forward Bob Lindner out on a winning note.

== See also ==
- Australian national rugby league team
- New Zealand national rugby league team
- Australia vs New Zealand in rugby league
