= 1993 New Zealand rugby league tour of Great Britain and France =

1993 Kiwis tour of Great Britain and France
- Date: 4 October 1993 – 21 November 1993
- Manager: Richard Bolton
- Coach: Howie Tamati
- Tour captain: Gary Freeman
- Top point scorer: Daryl Halligan (83)
- Top try scorer: Jason Mackie (8)
Summary
P	W	D	L
Total
15	10	0	5
Test match
5	2	0	3
Opponent
P	W	D	L
Wales
1	1	0	0
Great Britain
3	0	0	3
France
1	1	0	0

Tour chronology
- ← 1989 1998 →

The 1993 New Zealand rugby league tour of Great Britain and France was a tour by the New Zealand national rugby league team. The New Zealand national rugby league team lost a series 0-3 against Great Britain but defeated Wales and France in one-off test matches. They also won games against Wigan, St Helens, Widnes, Leeds and the Great Britain under 21's.

== Background ==
New Zealand last toured Great Britain in 1989.

Earlier in 1993, New Zealand had drawn 14-all with the Kangaroos at Mt Smart Stadium. This was the first ever draw between the two countries. They then lost 8-16 on a very wet Palmerston North Showgrounds before finishing the 1993 Trans-Tasman Test series by going down 4-16 at Lang Park in Brisbane.

The New Zealand squad for those matches was: Morvin Edwards, Sean Hoppe, Jarrod McCracken, Dave Watson, Daryl Halligan, Tea Ropati, Gary Freeman (C), Se'e Solomona, Duane Mann, Brent Todd, Gary Mercer, Quentin Pongia, Tawera Nikau, Tony Kemp, Brendon Tuuta, Jason Donnelly, Stephen Kearney, Gavin Hill and John Lomax while Howie Tamati was the coach and Richard Bolton was the manager. All of this squad, with the exception of Gavin Hill and Tony Kemp, were also selected for the tour of Great Britain and France. However, before the tour, they lost McCracken (surgery) and Brent Todd (injury). The Kiwis would also be without first choice goal kicking fullback Matthew Ridge who had suffered a season ending knee injury earlier in the year while playing for Manly. However, with the presence of other known Superboots Daryl Halligan and Wigan's Frano Botica, the Kiwi squad lacked nothing for goal kicking.

The Frank Endacott-coached Junior Kiwis toured Great Britain at the same time as the senior Kiwis, winning 11 of their 12 matches.

== Squad ==
A 26-man touring squad was selected in September 1993. Jarrod McCracken and Brent Todd both withdrew before the tour due to injuries, and were replaced by Blair Harding and Paul Johnson. Howie Tamati was the coach and Richard Bolton was the manager.

New Zealand players contracted to British clubs were not included in the touring squad, but could still be selected for the three Tests against Great Britain.

Junior Kiwis captain Henry Paul was called up to join the main squad mid-tour as a replacement for the injured Robert Piva.

Name	Club/District	Games	Tests	Tries	Goals	FGs	Points
Simon Angell	(New Zealand) Canterbury		0	0	0	0	0
Richie Blackmore	(England) Castleford		1	0	0	0	0
Frano Botica	(England) Wigan		2	0	5	0	10
Jason Donnelly	(Australia) St. George		0	0	0	0	0
Logan Edwards	(New Zealand) Canterbury		1	0	0	0	0
Morvin Edwards	(Australia) Balmain		3	0	0	0	0
Peter Edwards	(New Zealand) Wellington		1	0	0	0	0
Gary Freeman (c)	(Australia) Eastern Suburbs		4	1	0	0	4
Daryl Halligan	(Australia) North Sydney		3	1	12	0	28
Blair Harding	(New Zealand) Canterbury		0	0	0	0	0
Sean Hoppe	(Australia) Canberra		3	1	0	0	4
Kevin Iro	(England) Leeds		4	2	0	0	8
Paul Johnson	(New Zealand) Canterbury		0	0	0	0	0
Denvour Johnston	(New Zealand) Wellington		2	0	0	0	0
Stephen Kearney	(Australia) Western Suburbs		4	0	0	0	0
Tony Kemp	(England) Castleford		2	0	0	0	0
David Lomax	(New Zealand) Wellington		2	0	0	0	0
John Lomax	(Australia) Canberra		5	0	0	0	0
Jason Lowrie	(Australia) Eastern Suburbs		2	0	0	0	0
Jason Mackie	(New Zealand) Northland		5	2	0	0	8
Duane Mann	(New Zealand) Auckland		3	0	0	0	0
Gary Mercer	(England) Leeds		1	0	0	0	0
Gene Ngamu	(Australia) Manly-Warringah		2	0	0	0	0
Tawera Nikau	(England) Castleford		1	0	0	0	0
Mark Nixon	(New Zealand) Canterbury		0	0	0	0	0
Henry Paul	(New Zealand) Auckland		0	0	0	0	0
Robert Piva	(New Zealand) Wellington		1	0	0	0	0
Quentin Pongia	(Australia) Canberra		5	0	0	0	0
Iva Ropati	(New Zealand) Auckland		4	2	0	0	8
Se'e Solomona	(England) Oldham		2	0	0	0	0
Brent Stuart	(New Zealand) Canterbury		5	0	0	0	0
Whetu Taewa	(New Zealand) Canterbury		5	1	0	0	4
Dave Watson	(England) Bradford Northern		3	1	0	0	4
Aaron Whittaker	(New Zealand) Canterbury		1	0	0	0	0
Jason Williams	(Australia) Canterbury-Bankstown		5	1	0	0	4

== Fixtures ==
The New Zealand side played a total of five test matches while on their European tour and one test in New Zealand before leaving.

== Great Britain ==
=== Test Venues ===
The three Great Britain vs New Zealand tests took place at the following venues.

London	Wigan	Leeds
Wembley Stadium	Central Park	Headingley
Capacity: 82,000	Capacity: 25,000	Capacity: 22,000

=== Wales Test ===
The Kiwis opened their tour with what was their first test against Wales since the 1975 Rugby League World Cup. That game, won 25-24 by the Welsh, was also played in Swansea but at the St. Helen's Rugby and Cricket Ground. This game was played at the Vetch Field.

Monday 4 October 1993

Wales	19 – 24	New Zealand
Tries: Gerald Cordle (2) Goals: Jonathan Davies (5/7); Field Goals: Jonathan Griffiths (1)		Tries: Jason Mackie; Iva Ropati; Sean Hoppe; Goals: Daryl Halligan (6/7)

Vetch Field, Swansea
Attendance: 6,073
Referee: John Connolly (England)
Player of the Match: Quentin Pongia

Wales	New Zealand

FB	1	Phil Ford
RW	2	Gerald Cordle
RC	3	Allan Bateman
LC	4	John Devereux
LW	5	Anthony Sullivan
SO	6	Johnathan Davies (c)
SH	7	Kevin Ellis
PR	8	Mark Jones
HK	9	Barry Williams
PR	10	Dai Young
SR	11	Ian Marlow
SR	12	Rowland Phillips
LK	13	Jonathan Griffiths
Substitutions:
IC	14	Adrian Hadley
IC	15	Rob Ackerman
IC	16
IC	17
Coach:
(Wales) Clive Griffiths

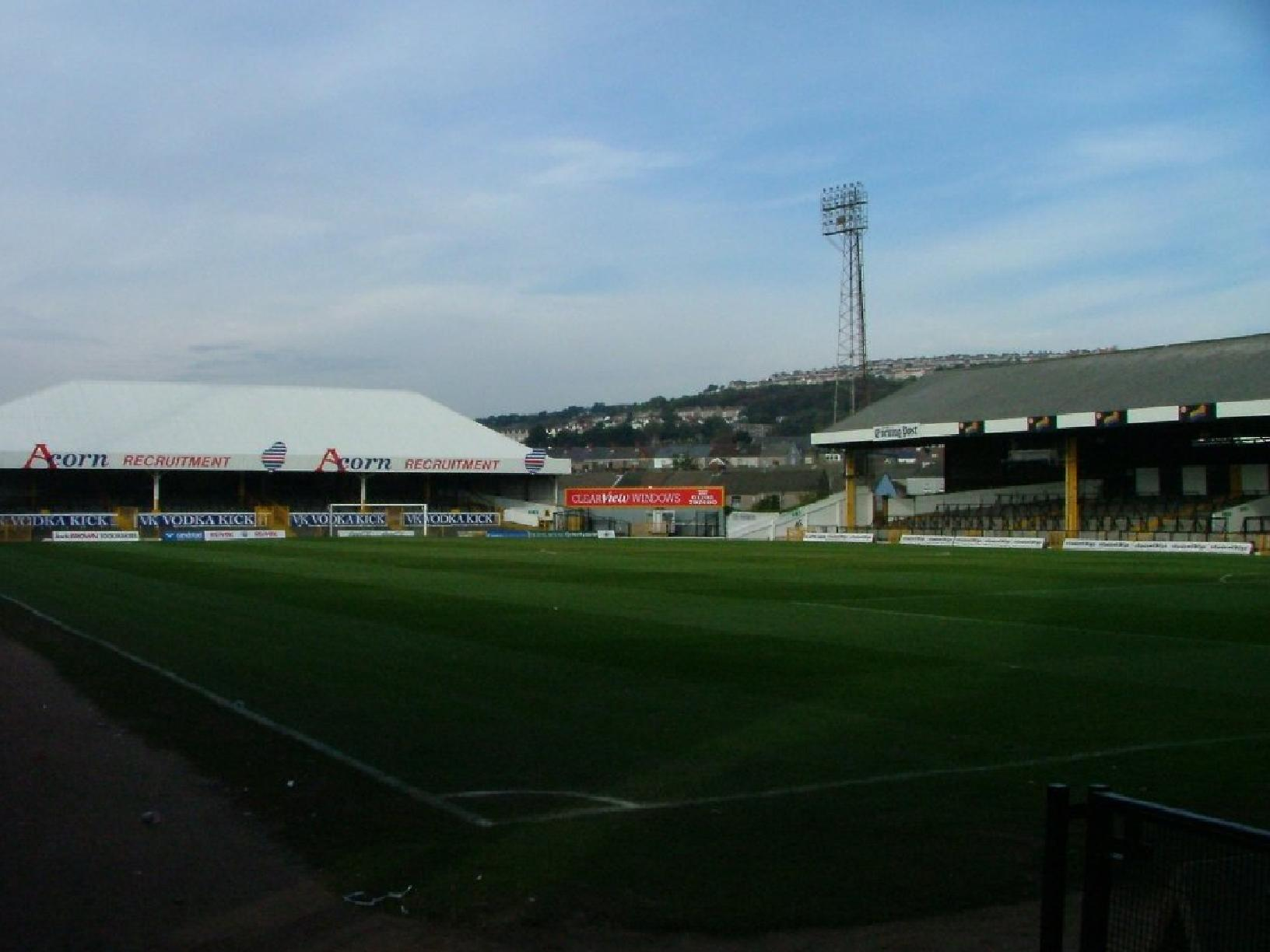

FB	1	Morvin Edwards
RW	2	Daryl Halligan
RC	3	Iva Ropati
LC	4	Whetu Taewa
LW	5	Sean Hoppe
FE	6	Gene Ngamu
HB	7	Gary Freeman (c)
PR	8	John Lomax
HK	9	Duane Mann
PR	10	Brent Stuart
SR	11	Stephen Kearney
SR	12	Quentin Pongia
LK	13	Jason Mackie
Substitutions:
IC	14	Jason Williams
IC	15	Robert Piva
IC	16
IC	17
Coach:
(New Zealand) Howie Tamati

Wales led for much of the first half. Two kicked penalties from Jonathan Davies and a drop goal from John Griffiths gave the impetus and on 27 minutes Davies put in a fantastic 40 yard kick to set up the flying Gareth Cordle to score Wales' first try.

However New Zealand were kept in the game by a succession of goals from the classy kicker Daryl Harrigan, and when Quentin Pongia punished a rare weak kick from Davies to set up Mackie just before half-time, the Kiwis took a narrow lead.

Ropati extended the lead to 7 points after the restart before Jiffy's magic took hold on the game again. He kicked a penalty and then repeated the trick of the first half, sending another long kick over the defence to give Cordle his second. Wales smelt victory at 17-16 but almost immediately a lost ball from Devereux allowed Mackie to set up the strong running Sean Hoppe. Both sides exchanged penalties and with a few minutes to go John Devereux took advantage of a hoisted bomb to send Wales into rapture with what they thought was the winning try. Agonisingly for the home side, reserve back Adrian Hadley was correctly ruled offside and Wales' last chance to steal the match was gone.

Although Wales did not record a notable victory, their performances in the lead-up to the World Cup suggested they were becoming increasingly competitive.

Tuesday 5 October

Bradford Northern	17 – 10	New Zealand
Tries: Goals:		Tries: Goals:

Odsal Stadium, Bradford
Attendance: 5,015
Referee: Russell Smith
Player of the Match: Deryck Fox

Bradford Northern: Dave Watson, Gerald Cordle, Steve McGowan, Darrel Shelford, Brimah Kebbie, Neil Summers, Deryck Fox, Paul Grayshon, Trevor Clark, Jon Hamer, Roy Powell, Paul Medley, Karl Fairbank. Res – Daio Powell, Carl Winterburn, Adam Greenwood, Keith Mumby. Coach – Peter Fox

New Zealand: Peter Edwards, Whetu Taewa, Jason Williams, Blair Harding, Jason Donnelly, Mark Nixon (c), Aaron Whittaker, Robert Piva, Denvour Johnston, Jason Lowrie, Simon Angell, David Lomax, Logan Edwards. Res – Gary Freeman, Quentin Pongia, Daryl Halligan, Paul Johnson

Kiwi forward Quentin Pongia was suspended for one game after being sent off for a high tackle.

Sunday 10 October

Wigan	18 – 25	New Zealand
Tries: Shaun Edwards, Neil Cowie, Martin Hall; Goals: Andy Farrell (3/3)		Tries: Sean Hoppe (2), Gene Ngamu, Whetu Taewa, Jason Mackie; Goals: Gene Ngamu (1/5); Field Goals: Daryl Halligan (1)

Central Park, Wigan
Attendance: 13,669
Referee: Robin Whitfield

Wigan: Joe Lydon, Jason Robinson, Dean Bell (c), Gary Connolly, Sam Panapa, Frano Botica, Shaun Edwards, Neil Cowie, Martin Hall, Ian Gildart, Denis Betts, Andy Farrell, Phil Clarke. Res - Paul Stevens, Barrie-Jon Mather, Mick Cassidy, Martin Dermott. Coach - John Dorahy

New Zealand: Daryl Halligan, Sean Hoppe, Iva Ropati, Whetu Taewa, Jason Williams, Gene Ngamu, Gary Freeman (c), John Lomax, Duane Mann, Brent Stuart, Stephen Kearney, Robert Piva, Jason Mackie. Res - Aaron Whittaker, David Lomax, Jason Donnelly, Jason Lowrie

Surprisingly, Kiwi coach Howie Tamati elected to have Gene Ngamu kicking the goals despite the presence of 'superboot' Daryl Halligan at fullback in place of Morvin Edwards who was suffering from the flu. The ploy almost backfired as Ngamu only kicked one goal from five attempts. The match was highlighted by Sean Hoppe's 90 metre intercept try in the second half in which he left both Gary Connolly and Sam Panapa in his wake. Frano Botica, who would represent the Kiwis later in the test series, played against his national squad for Wigan.

Tuesday 12 October

Castleford	16 – 4	New Zealand
Tries: St. John Ellis (3), Simon Middleton; Goals:		Tries: Goals:

Wheldon Road, Castleford
Attendance: 4,927
Referee: David Campbell

Castleford: Graham Steadman, St. John Ellis, Richie Blackmore, Grant Anderson, Simon Middleton, Tony Kemp, Mike Ford, Lee Crooks (c), Richard Russell, Tony Morrison, Mike Ketteridge, Andrew Hay, Ian Smales. Res – Jason Flowers, Keith England, Tony Smith, Dean Sampson. Coach – John Joyner

=== 1st Test ===
Saturday 16 October 1993

Great Britain	17 – 0	New Zealand
Tries: Jason Robinson (2); John Devereux; Goals: Jonathan Davies (2); Field Goals: Jonathan Davies (1)		Tries: Goals:

Wembley Stadium, London
Attendance: 36,131
Referee: Greg McCallum (Australia)

Great Britain	New Zealand

FB	1	Johnathan Davies
LW	2	Jason Robinson
RC	3	Paul Newlove
LC	4	Gary Connolly
RW	5	John Devereux
SO	6	Garry Schofield (c)
SH	7	Shaun Edwards
PR	8	Karl Harrison
HK	9	Martin Dermott
PR	10	Karl Fairbank
SR	11	Denis Betts
SR	12	Chris Joynt
LK	13	Phil Clarke
Substitutions:
IC	14	Daryl Powell
IC	15	Richard Eyres
IC	16	Alan Tait
IC	17	Sonny Nickle
Coach:
(England) Mal Reilly

FB	1	Morvin Edwards
RW	2	Daryl Halligan
RC	3	Kevin Iro
LC	4	Dave Watson
LW	5	Sean Hoppe
FE	6	Gene Ngamu
HB	7	Gary Freeman (c)
PR	8	John Lomax
HK	9	Duane Mann
PR	10	Brent Stuart
SR	11	Stephen Kearney
SR	12	Quentin Pongia
LK	13	Tawera Nikau
Substitutions:
IC	14	Jason Mackie
IC	15	Jason Williams
IC	16	Whetu Taewa
IC	17	Jason Lowrie
Coach:
(New Zealand) Howie Tamati

Wednesday 20 October

St Helens	8 – 14	New Zealand
Tries: Goals:		Tries: Goals:

Knowsley Road, St Helens
Attendance: 8,170

St Helens: David Lyon, Mike Riley, Phil Veivers, Paul Loughlin, Alan Hunte, Tea Ropati, Jonathan Griffiths, Jon Neill, Bernard Dwyer, George Mann, Chris Joynt, Sonny Nickle, Shane Cooper (c). Res – Les Quirk, Adam Fogerty, Augustine O'Donnell. Coach – Eric Hughes

Sunday 24 October

Leeds	6 – 35	New Zealand
Tries: Kevin Iro; Goals: Simon Irving		Tries: Goals:

Headingley, Leeds
Attendance: 6,820
Referee: John Holdsworth

Leeds: Alan Tait, Jim Fallon, Kevin Iro, Simon Irving, Jonathan Scales, Garry Schofield (c), Gareth Stephens, Neil Harmon, James Lowes, Gary Rose, Ian Scott, Richie Eyres, Gary Mercer. Res – Graham Holroyd, Andy Gregory, Jim Leatham, Francis Cummins. Coach – Doug Laughton

Tuesday 26 October

Great Britain U/21	24 – 37	New Zealand
Tries: Goals:		Tries: Goals:

Derwent Park, Workington
Attendance: 3,099

=== 2nd Test ===
Saturday 30 October 1993

Great Britain	29 – 12	New Zealand
Tries: John Devereux (2); Paul Newlove; Martin Offiah; Garry Schofield; Goals: Jonathan Davies (4/7); Field Goals: Garry Schofield (1)		Tries: Iva Ropati; Dave Watson Goals: Frano Botica (2/3)

Central Park, Wigan
Attendance: 16,502
Referee: Greg McCallum (Australia)

Great Britain	New Zealand

FB	1	Johnathan Davies
RW	2	John Devereux
RC	3	Paul Newlove
LC	4	Gary Connolly
LW	5	Martin Offiah
SO	6	Garry Schofield (c)
SH	7	Shaun Edwards
PR	8	Karl Harrison
HK	9	Lee Jackson
PR	10	Karl Fairbank
SR	11	Sonny Nickle
SR	12	Chris Joynt
LK	13	Phil Clarke
Substitutions:
IC	14	Daryl Powell
IC	15	Richard Eyres
IC	16	Alan Tait
IC	17	Michael Jackson
Coach:
(England) Mal Reilly

FB	1	Morvin Edwards
RW	2	Frano Botica
RC	3	Kevin Iro
LC	4	Iva Ropati
LW	5	Sean Hoppe
FE	6	Tony Kemp
HB	7	Gary Freeman (c)
PR	8	Se'e Solomona
HK	9	Duane Mann
PR	10	Brent Stuart
SR	11	Stephen Kearney
SR	12	Quentin Pongia
LK	13	Jason Mackie
Substitutions:
IC	14	Jason Williams
IC	15	John Lomax
IC	16	Whetu Taewa
IC	17	Gary Mercer
Coach:
(New Zealand) Howie Tamati

Martin Offiah's standing as the fastest player in rugby league took a beating during the second half when after making a break, he was unceremoniously bundled into touch after a 40-metre run by Kevin Iro. Offiah, recalled to the Lions test side after missing the first test at Wembley through injury, had a 3-metre head start on the Kiwi centre.

Tuesday 2 November

Widnes	10 – 18	New Zealand
Tries: Goals:		Tries: Goals:

Naughton Park, Widnes
Attendance: 8,170

Widnes: Stuart Spruce, David Myers, Dave Ruane, Karle Hammond, Adrian Hadley, Christian Tyrer, Bobbie Goulding, Andy Ireland, Steve McCurrie, Rodney Howe, Esene Faimalo, Jon Grieve, Paul Hulme (c). Res – Jason Hunter, Paul Harris, David Smith. Coach – Phil Larder

=== 3rd Test ===
Great Britain wrapped up the series 3-0 with a commanding 29-10 win at Headingley in Leeds.

Saturday 6 November 1993

Great Britain	29 – 10	New Zealand
Tries: Phil Clarke; Jonathan Davies; Karl Fairbank; Andy Farrell; Martin Offiah; Goals: Jonathan Davies (4/6); Field Goals: Jonathan Davies (1)		Tries: Jason Williams Goals: Frano Botica (3/4)

Headingley, Leeds
Attendance: 15,139
Referee: Greg McCallum (Australia)

Great Britain	New Zealand

FB	1	Johnathan Davies
RW	2	John Devereux
RC	3	Paul Newlove
LC	4	Gary Connolly
LW	5	Martin Offiah
SO	6	Garry Schofield (c)
SH	7	Shaun Edwards
PR	8	Karl Harrison
HK	9	Lee Jackson
PR	10	Karl Fairbank
SR	11	Andy Farrell
SR	12	Chris Joynt
LK	13	Phil Clarke
Substitutions:
IC	14	Daryl Powell
IC	15	Sonny Nickle
IC	16	Alan Tait
IC	17	Michael Jackson
Coach:
(England) Mal Reilly

FB	1	Dave Watson
RW	2	Frano Botica
RC	3	Kevin Iro
LC	4	Iva Ropati
LW	5	Sean Hoppe
FE	6	Tony Kemp
HB	7	Aaron Whittaker
PR	8	Se'e Solomona
HK	9	Denvour Johnston
PR	10	Brent Stuart
SR	11	Stephen Kearney (c)
SR	12	Quentin Pongia
LK	13	Jason Mackie
Substitutions:
IC	14	Richie Blackmore
IC	15	John Lomax
IC	16	Whetu Taewa
IC	17	David Lomax
Coach:
(New Zealand) Howie Tamati

After New Zealand lost the second test, and the series, coach Howie Tamati selected Aaron Whittaker at halfback over the incumbent captain, Gary Freeman. After the match Tamati stated "I didn't believe I could win with Gary, it didn't come off but I believe the decision I made gave us a chance, whereas before we had no chance."

The match was highlighted by an 80-metre try to Lions fullback Jonathan Davies.

== France ==
11 November 1993

Roussillon	22 – 24	New Zealand

Stade Gilbert Brutus, Perpignan
Attendance: 5,000

14 November 1993

France B	4 – 45	New Zealand

Stade de la Roseraie, Marseille
Attendance: 2,300
Referee: Pierre Gonzales

17 November 1993

Midi-Pyrenees XIII	2 – 30	New Zealand

Stade Jules Ribet, Saint-Gaudens
Attendance: 1,700

=== French Test ===
The Kiwis restored some pride by defeating France 36-11 in the test in Carcassonne.

Sunday 21 November 1993

France	11 – 36	New Zealand
Tries: Bernard Llong; Claude Sirvent Goals: Pierre Chamorin (1); Field Goals: Pierre Chamorin (1)		Tries: Kevin Iro (2); Gary Freeman; Daryl Halligan; Jason Mackie; Whetu Taewa; Goals: Daryl Halligan (6)

Stade d'Albert Domec, Carcassonne
Attendance: 3,500
Referee: John Holdsworth (England)

France	New Zealand

FB	1	Frantz Martial
RW	2	Claude Sirvent
RC	3	Pierre Chamorin
LC	4	David Fraisse
LW	5	Pascal Bomati
SO	6	Jean-Marc Garcia
SH	7	Patrick Entat (c)
PR	8	Bernard Llong
HK	9	Mathieu Khedemi
PR	10	Lilian Hébert
SR	11	Ezzedine Attia
SR	12	Mark Bourneville
LK	13	Daniel Divet
Substitutions:
IC	14	Pascal Jampy
IC	15	Thierry Valero
IC	16	Jean Frison
IC	17
Coach:
(France) Jean-Christophe Vergeynst

FB	1	Morvin Edwards
RW	2	Daryl Halligan
RC	3	Kevin Iro
LC	4	Whetu Taewa
LW	5	Jason Williams
FE	6	Tony Kemp
HB	7	Gary Freeman (c)
PR	8	Brent Stuart
HK	9	Denvour Johnston
PR	10	John Lomax
SR	11	Jason Lowrie
SR	12	Quentin Pongia
LK	13	Jason Mackie
Substitutions:
IC	14	Iva Ropati
IC	15	Logan Edwards
IC	16	Peter Edwards
IC	17	David Lomax
Coach:
(New Zealand) Howie Tamati

== Aftermath ==
The tourists were the first New Zealand team to be whitewashed by Great Britain since the 1951–52 Kiwis tour. The tour made a profit of NZ$238,175.

Due to the disappointing results against Great Britain, and in the Trans-Tasman Test series against Australia earlier in the year, Howie Tamati was sacked as New Zealand's head coach. Frank Endacott was appointed the new New Zealand coach from 1994. The Kiwis were next in Great Britain for the 1995 Rugby League World Cup.
