= 1998 New Zealand rugby league tour of Great Britain =

The 1998 New Zealand rugby league tour of Great Britain was a tour by the New Zealand national rugby league team. The New Zealand national rugby league team defeated Great Britain 2–0 in the three match test series.

== Background ==
New Zealand arrived in Great Britain for the first time since the 1995 World Cup, having already lost a test series 1–2 with Australia. It was the first full tour of Great Britain by a New Zealand side since 1993.

Many of the squad, including coach Frank Endacott, had been involved in the Auckland Warriors' 1998 season, where they had finished 15th out of 20 clubs. In addition to this the Auckland Rugby League were looking to sell the club during the tour.

== Squad ==
A 22-man squad was named by coach Frank Endacott. Shortly before the tour, captain Matthew Ridge announced his retirement from international rugby league, and Quentin Pongia was appointed as his replacement. Centres Willie Talau and Richie Blackmore were unavailable due to injury.

The squad included two sets of brothers; the Iros, Kevin and Tony and the Pauls, Robbie and Henry.

Name	Test1	Test2	Test3	Games	Tries	Goals	FGs	Points	Club
Richie Barnett	FB	FB	FB	3	2	0	0	8	Sydney Roosters
Nathan Cayless	BE	BE	BE	3	0	0	0	0	Parramatta Eels
Syd Eru	HK	HK	HK	3	0	0	0	0	Auckland Warriors
Daryl Halligan	WG	WG	WG	3	0	14	0	28	Canterbury Bulldogs
Sean Hoppe	WG	WG	WG	3	1	0	0	4	Auckland Warriors
Kevin Iro	CE	CE	CE	3	0	0	0	0	Auckland Warriors
Tony Iro	BE	BE		2	0	0	0	0	Adelaide Rams
Stacey Jones	HB	HB	HB	3	1	0	1	5	Auckland Warriors
Stephen Kearney	SR	SR	SR	3	1	0	0	4	Auckland Warriors
Jarrod McCracken	SR	SR	SR	3	0	0	0	0	Parramatta Eels
Henry Paul	BE	BE	BE	3	2	0	0	8	Wigan Warriors
Robbie Paul	FE	FE	FE	3	3	0	0	12	Bradford Bulls
Quentin Pongia (c)	PR	PR	PR	3	0	0	0	0	Auckland Warriors
Tony Puletua	BE	BE	BE	3	1	0	0	4	Penrith Panthers
Craig Smith			BE	1	0	0	0	0	Illawarra Steelers
Logan Swann	LK	LK	LK	3	0	0	0	0	Auckland Warriors
Joe Vagana	PR	PR	PR	3	1	0	0	4	Auckland Warriors
Ruben Wiki	CE	CE	CE	3	1	0	0	4	Canberra Raiders

== Fixtures ==
They won the first two test matches 22–16 and 36–16 before being held to a 23-all draw in the third and final test match. Australian referee Bill Harrigan controlled all three Test matches.

In the second test match Great Britain were ahead 16–8 at halftime before letting in 28 points in the second half to lose the match and the series.

Date	Opponent	Venue	Result	Score	Attendance	Report
31 October 1998	Great Britain	Alfred McAlpine Stadium, Huddersfield	Won	22–16	18,500	
7 November 1998	Great Britain	Reebok Stadium, Bolton	Win	36–16	27,486	
14 November 1998	Great Britain	Vicarage Road, Watford	Draw	23–23	13,217	

== Aftermath ==
New Zealand next competed against Great Britain in the 1999 Tri-Nations but did not tour Great Britain again until the 2000 World Cup. The next full tour was conducted in 2002 which saw a drawn test series 1-all.

The Auckland Warriors were sold to a consortium that included majority investor the Tainui tribe as well as Graham Lowe and Malcolm Boyle. Kiwi coach Frank Endacott was replaced as Warriors coach and several Kiwis left the club included Stephen Kearney, Quentin Pongia, and Kevin Iro. Endacott's next coaching assignment would be the 1999 ANZAC Test on 23 April.
