= 1991 Trans-Tasman Test series =

The 1991 Trans-Tasman Test series was an international rugby league test series played in Australia between Australia and New Zealand. The series, which started on 3 July in Melbourne and finished on 31 July in Brisbane, consisted of three test matches, with the third test doubling as a 1989–1992 Rugby League World Cup tournament match. New Zealand did not play in any other matches while on tour.

The test series was broadcast throughout Australia by the Seven Network with commentary provided by Pat Welsh, Roy Masters and Jon Harker. Paul Vautin provided sideline commentary during the first test in Melbourne but was replaced from the second test by Harker to allow Wally Lewis to join the team following his omission from the Australian test team. Also doing sideline reporting during the series was John Brady. The series was broadcast in New Zealand by TV3 with commentary provided by Australia's Graeme Hughes and former New Zealand and then-Manly-Warringah coach Graham Lowe with sideline comments from former Kiwi test captain Hugh McGahan.

== Australia ==
The Australians, coached by Bob Fulton and captained by Mal Meninga, had come out of the successful 1990 Kangaroo Tour, while all players selected for the three Kiwi tests had recently participated in the 1991 State of Origin series, won by Queensland 2–1 over New South Wales (Queensland were actually coached by former Kiwi test coach Graham Lowe). Queensland captain Wally Lewis made his return to the test team for the first test at Olympic Park, after missing most of 1990 and all that year's tests with torn hamstring and later a broken right forearm. Lewis had been controversially ruled out of the Kangaroo Tour by team doctor Nathan Gibbs. Melbourne would prove to be his final test in the Green and Gold, Lewis being one of four players dropped from the side after the 8–24 loss to the Kiwis (second row forward Bob Lindner, voted as the player of the Kangaroo Tour, also missed the final two tests after breaking his leg at Olympic Park).

The series saw the start of the international careers of Canberra Raiders hooker Steve Walters, who beat out Kangaroo incumbent and NSW captain Benny Elias for first test hooking role (Walters had actually been lucky to get the Qld hooking role as his younger brother, former test hooker Kerrod Walters, had been suspended), and wingers Willie Carne (Brisbane Broncos) and Rod Wishart (Illawarra Steelers), who made their debut in the second test in Sydney, with all three scoring tries on debut. Also making his Australian debut in Sydney was Eastern Suburbs front row forward Craig Salvatori, who played his only two career tests during the series. The series would be the last appearance in an Australian jumper of veteran test players Wally Lewis and Des Hasler as well as Penrith forward Mark Geyer. Giant (6 ft 6 in; 198 cm) Broncos and Queensland fullback Paul Hauff, the tallest ever recorded fullback in Australian premiership history, made his only appearance in an Australian jumper in the first test after starring for Qld in the Origin series. It was to be his only test however, with Andrew Ettingshausen preferred for the final two tests.

== New Zealand ==
The New Zealand test team was coached by Bob Bailey and captained by Balmain Tigers halfback Gary Freeman, who had actually been dropped to Reserve Grade at the time by Tigers (and former Wallabies) coach Alan Jones. The Kiwis came into the series on the back of a two-test series win over France, and consisted of players playing in New Zealand, Australia and in the UK, while the Australian team consisted of players only from the Winfield Cup.

Goal kicking former All Blacks and now Wigan-based utility back Frano Botica, who 3 weeks earlier had made his Kiwi debut in the first test against France at Carlaw Park becoming New Zealand's 30th dual rugby international, was the Kiwis fullback for the three tests. Australian coach Bob Fulton rated Botica as good as any fullback in the Winfield Cup. The only Kiwi on debut in Melbourne was Christchurch-born, South Sydney Rabbitohs winger Jason Williams, playing the first of 12 career tests.

The Kiwis were managed by Ray Haffenden. Unlike the Australians whose squad all played in the NSWRL premiership, the Kiwis squad for the tour included those playing in New Zealand, Australia and England. The Kiwis squad was: Gary Freeman (Balmain), Richie Blackmore (Castleford), Frano Botica (Wigan) Peter Brown (Halifax), Clayton Friend (Carlisle), Kevin Iro (Manly-Warringah), Tony Kemp (Newcastle), Emosi Koloto (Widnes), Dean Lonergan (Auckland), Duane Mann (Warrington), George Mann (St. Helens), Jarrod McCracken (Canterbury-Bankstown), Gary Mercer (Warrington), Tawera Nikau (Castleford), Mike Patton (Glenora), Brent Todd (Canberra), Dave Watson (Halifax) and Jason Williams (South Sydney).

Several ex-rugby union players playing in the Winfield Cup, including former All Blacks John Schuster (Newcastle), Matthew Ridge (Manly-Warringah) and Kurt Sherlock (Eastern Suburbs), as well as Daryl Halligan (North Sydney), were unavailable due to a dispute between their respective clubs and the NZRL over compensation, though Manly, Newcastle and the NZRL did manage to come to an agreement over Kevin Iro (who had only joined the Sea Eagles a month before the series) and Tony Kemp respectively. Despite the unavailability of Winfield Cup 'superboots' Ridge and Halligan, the Kiwis lost nothing in goal kicking due to the selection of Wigan 'superboot' Frano Botica.

With around-the-corner style kicker Botica doing the goal kicking for New Zealand, and Australia relying on the older style (and less accurate) toe-poke style of kicking employed by captain Mal Meninga, goal kicking was one area where the Kiwis were thought to have an advantage over the Australian's going into the series.

== Test Venues ==
The three tests took place at the following venues.

Melbourne	Sydney	Brisbane
Olympic Park	Sydney Football Stadium	Lang Park
Capacity: 26,900	Capacity: 42,500	Capacity: 32,500

== First Test ==
The first test of the 1991 series was also the first-ever rugby league test match to be played in Australia not held in either New South Wales or Queensland.

Wednesday, 3 July 1991

Australia	8 – 24	New Zealand
Tries: Steve Walters Goals: Mal Meninga (2/3)		Tries: Jarrod McCracken; Richie Blackmore; Clayton Friend; Tawera Nikau; Goals: Frano Botica (4/6)

Olympic Park, Melbourne
Attendance: 26,900
Referee: John Holdsworth (England)
Player of the Match: Jarrod McCracken

Australia	New Zealand

FB	1	Paul Hauff
LW	2	Dale Shearer
CE	3	Mal Meninga (c)
CE	4	Chris Johns
RW	5	Andrew Ettingshausen
FE	6	Wally Lewis
HB	7	Allan Langer
PR	8	Steve Roach
HK	9	Steve Walters
PR	10	Martin Bella
SR	11	Ian Roberts
SR	12	Bob Lindner
LK	13	Bradley Clyde
Substitutions:
IC	14	David Gillespie
IC	15	John Cartwright
IC	16	Des Hasler
IC	17	Peter Jackson
Coach:
(Australia) Bob Fulton

FB	1	Frano Botica
RW	2	Richie Blackmore
CE	3	Jarrod McCracken
CE	4	Dave Watson
LW	5	Jason Williams
FE	6	Tony Kemp
HB	7	Gary Freeman (c)
PR	8	Brent Todd
HK	9	Duane Mann
PR	10	Peter Brown
SR	11	Emosi Koloto
SR	12	Dean Lonergan
LF	13	Tawera Nikau
Substitutions:
IC	14	Clayton Friend
IC	15	George Mann
IC	16	Gary Mercer
IC	17	Mike Patton
Coach:
(New Zealand) Bob Bailey

New Zealand pulled off an upset 24–8 win in front of 26,900 fans in Melbourne, beating the Australians in their first test at home for the third straight time following a successful Kangaroo Tour after also defeating the Kangaroos at Lang Park in both 1983 and 1987.

Australian second-row forward Bob Lindner broke his right leg during the second half of the game. Neither English referee John Holdsworth, nor the touch judges, saw Kiwi front rower Peter Brown deliberately knock the ball from Lindner's hands as he was lying on the ground in pain. Despite Lindner lying on the ground crying out in pain, Holdsworth ruled play-on believing the Australian second rower had simply lost the ball. The Kiwis then swept the ball out to the left, where winger Richie Blackmore beat a Dale Shearer tackle to score. Champion pivot Wally Lewis played the last of his 34 tests for Australia as age and injuries were finally catching up with the 31-year-old 1986 Kangaroos captain, though he went close to scoring in the second half but was held up over the line by a desperate Gary Freeman. It was also the last of 19 tests for veteran Aussie prop forward Steve Roach, while fullback Paul Hauff played his only test match after the Kiwis exposed the tall fullback's problem handling balls around his feet with constant grubber kicks on the greasy surface. The Kiwis' game plan was to avoid using the bomb as Hauff and wingers Dale Shearer and Andrew Ettingshausen (also noted fullbacks) were considered safe under the high ball, and it worked to perfection. On debut, Canberra and Queensland hooker Steve Walters was one of Australia's best in a losing side, scoring his team's only try with a determined drive from dummy half midway through the first half.

Lewis, Hauff and 16-test veteran Dale Shearer were widely touted never to play for Australia again after poor performances. Shearer missed two tackles on Kiwi winger Richie Blackmore in the second half; the first allowed him to make a 30-metre break down the touchline before passing to Man of the match Jarrod McCracken who dived over for the Kiwis' first try despite a last-ditch tackle from Ettingshausen who had raced across from the far wing. Later Shearer failed to stop Blackmore only five metres from his line, letting the winger in for New Zealand's second try. Shearer had also bombed a try early in the first half: after receiving a pass from Meninga and making a break down the left wing he chip kicked but dropped over Frano Botica but the ball was over the line as he attempted to catch it.

The opening tackle of the game saw an accidental head clash between Steve Roach and Kiwi second rower Dean Lonergan which left Lonergan convulsing on the ground (he would recover and finish the game) while Roach received a cut which needed eight stitches.

Both captains, first Gary Freeman and then Mal Meninga, were sent to the sin-bin in the second half by English referee Holdsworth.

== Second Test ==
The attendance of 34,911 at the Sydney Football Stadium was the largest for a test match in Australia since 1977.

Wednesday, 24 July 1991

Australia	44 – 0	New Zealand
Tries: Laurie Daley (2); Mark Geyer; Bradley Clyde; Rod Wishart; David Gillespie; Willie Carne; Des Hasler; Goals: Mal Meninga (6/8)		Tries: Goals: Frano Botica (0/1)

Sydney Football Stadium, Sydney
Attendance: 34,911
Referee: John Holdsworth (England)
Player of the Match: Bradley Clyde

Australia	New Zealand

FB	1	Andrew Ettingshausen
RW	2	Willie Carne
CE	3	Mal Meninga (c)
CE	4	Laurie Daley
LW	5	Rod Wishart
FE	6	Peter Jackson
HB	7	Allan Langer
PR	8	Craig Salvatori
HK	9	Steve Walters
PR	10	Martin Bella
SR	11	Mark Geyer
SR	12	David Gillespie
LK	13	Bradley Clyde
Substitutions:
IC	14	Des Hasler
IC	15	Chris Johns
IC	16	John Cartwright
IC	17	Ian Roberts
Coach:
(Australia) Bob Fulton

FB	1	Frano Botica
LW	2	Richie Blackmore
CE	3	Jarrod McCracken
CE	4	Kevin Iro
RW	5	Jason Williams
FE	6	Dave Watson
HB	7	Gary Freeman (c)
PR	8	Brent Todd
HK	9	Duane Mann
PR	10	Peter Brown
SR	11	Emosi Koloto
SR	12	Dean Lonergan
LF	13	Tawera Nikau
Substitutions:
IC	14	Clayton Friend
IC	15	George Mann
IC	16	Gary Mercer
IC	17	Mike Patton
Coach:
(New Zealand) Bob Bailey

The Australians, with a new-look side including six new faces following the first test loss (three of them on debut), ran in eight tries to nil to level the series at one all with a resounding 44–0 win. Illawarra Steelers winger Rod Wishart became the second player from the club to represent Australia after Queensland winger Alan McIndoe, and scored a try on debut. Wishart, like his coach Bob Fulton, was an Illawarra region junior where he played for Gerringong where he was coached by long serving Parramatta, NSW and Australian goal kicking centre Mick Cronin. Australia's other winger on debut was Brisbane Broncos 1990 Rookie of the Year Willie Carne, who also scored a try in a confident display. With Australia going into the match with two specialist wingers, Andrew Ettingshausen was moved from the wing to his preferred fullback spot for his first test in the position after playing nine of his previous ten tests on the flank. The other player on debut was Eastern Suburbs front row forward Craig Salvatori who replaced Balmain's Steve Roach.

Recalled Australian five-eight Peter Jackson, and Kiwi centre Jarrod McCracken were both sent off in the first half for fighting following a high tackle on Wishart by Kiwi five-eighth Dave Watson. After scoring 24 points in the first test, New Zealand's only scoring opportunity in the game was a missed penalty goal by Frano Botica in the first half, Australia's defence remaining rock solid while their attack, led by Allan Langer, Laurie Daley and man of the match Bradley Clyde, ran riot.

== Third Test ==
The third and final match of the 1991 Trans-Tasman Test series, played at Brisbane's Lang Park, also doubled as a 1989–1992 Rugby League World Cup tournament match.

Wednesday, 31 July 1991

Australia	40 – 12	New Zealand
Tries: Willie Carne; Mal Meninga; Steve Walters; Rod Wishart; Bradley Clyde; Andrew Ettingshausen; Laurie Daley; Goals: Mal Meninga (6/9)		Tries: Jarrod McCracken; Richie Blackmore Goals: Frano Botica (2/2)

Lang Park, Brisbane
Attendance: 29,139
Referee: John Holdsworth (England)
Player of the Match: Mark Geyer

Australia	New Zealand

FB	1	Andrew Ettingshausen
RW	2	Willie Carne
CE	3	Mal Meninga (c)
CE	4	Laurie Daley
LW	5	Rod Wishart
FE	6	Peter Jackson
HB	7	Allan Langer
PR	8	Craig Salvatori
HK	9	Steve Walters
PR	10	Martin Bella
SR	11	Mark Geyer
SR	12	David Gillespie
LK	13	Bradley Clyde
Substitutions:
IC	14	Des Hasler
IC	15	Chris Johns
IC	16	John Cartwright
IC	17	Ian Roberts
Coach:
(Australia) Bob Fulton

FB	1	Frano Botica
LW	2	Richie Blackmore
CE	3	Jarrod McCracken
CE	4	Kevin Iro
RW	6	Dave Watson
FE	7	Gary Freeman (c)
HB	14	Clayton Friend
PR	8	Brent Todd
HK	9	Duane Mann
PR	10	Peter Brown
SR	15	George Mann
SR	17	Gary Mercer
LF	13	Tawera Nikau
Substitutions:
IC	5	Jason Williams
IC	11	Emosi Koloto
IC	12	Esene Faimalo
IC	16	Mike Patton
Coach:
(New Zealand) Bob Bailey

Carrying on from their 44–0 win in Sydney only a week before, the Australians, who went into the match with an unchanged lineup, ran in seven tries to two, defeating New Zealand 40–12 to win the World Cup points.

Australian captain Mal Meninga broke the Australian test point-scoring record of Michael Cronin (201 points) with his first-half try. Meninga justified coach Bob Fulton's decision for his captain to be the team's goal kicker when he landed 14/20 for the series, despite the addition of goal-kicking winger Rod Wishart to the team from the second test. Wishart had kicked 33 of 43 goals (76.7%) for the Steelers in the 1991 Winfield Cup before making his test debut, while Meninga had kicked 34 of 60 goals (56.6%) for his side Canberra.

Giant Penrith back row forward Mark Geyer, playing in what would prove to be his last test match, was named as Man of the Match.

== Aftermath ==
Following the 1991 NSWRL season, the Kangaroos embarked on their first (and as of 2024, only) Tour of Papua New Guinea. The Kangaroos would win all 5 games played on the tour including the two tests against Papua New Guinea.

Australia went on to finish undefeated in World Cup pool play, with eight victories. New Zealand finished third, equal with Great Britain on points, with five wins and three losses, but behind on points differential.

In the 1992 World Cup final, held in front of an international record 73,631 fans at the famous Wembley Stadium in London, England, Australia defeated Great Britain 10–6 to win their seventh Rugby League World Cup.

New Zealand would next defeat Australia in the 1998 Anzac Test at the North Harbour Stadium in Auckland. They would not defeat them in a series until defeating them 24–0 in the 2005 Tri-Nations Final at the Elland Road stadium in Leeds, England.

== See also ==
- Australian national rugby league team
- New Zealand national rugby league team
- Australia vs New Zealand in rugby league
- Rugby League World Cup
