= Morvin Edwards =

New Zealand international rugby league footballer

Personal information
- Full name: Morvin Renata Tewhetu Aroha Edwards
- Born: 8 May 1968 (age 58) Wellington, New Zealand

Playing information
- Height: 183 cm (6 ft 0 in)
- Weight: 87 kg (13 st 10 lb)
- Position: Fullback, Centre, Wing
Club
Years	Team	Pld	T	G	FG	P
19??	Upper Hutt Tigers
1988–89	Swinton	10	5	0	0	20
1991–93	Leeds	37	7	0	0	28
1993–94	Balmain Tigers	26	6	2	0	28
1995–98	Penrith Panthers	38	4	0	0	16
	Total	111	22	2	0	92
Representative
Years	Team	Pld	T	G	FG	P
1988–91	Wellington	27
1990	New Zealand Māori	1	0	2	0	4
1989–93	New Zealand	11	0	2	0	4
- Education: Hato Paora College

Morvin Renata Tewhetu Aroha Edwards (born 8 May 1968) is a New Zealand former professional rugby league footballer who represented New Zealand. His position of preference was at fullback.

== Early life ==
Contrary to some reports, Edwards is not the son of fellow Kiwis representative Sam Edwards.

== Playing career ==
Edwards played for the Upper Hutt club and represented Wellington before moving to England. He won a premiership with Upper Hutt and captained Wellington to their first ever win over a touring international side.

In England he played for both Swinton and Leeds.

After leaving Leeds he attracted interest from Oldham but ultimately decided to move to Australia and join Balmain. He moved to Penrith in 1995, playing thirty eight games for the club before retiring.

== Representative career ==
In 1990, Morvin Edwards played his first two Tests for New Zealand against the touring Great Britain Lions, playing from the bench in the 1st Test at the Palmerston North Showgrounds and again from the bench in the 3rd Test at the Queen Elizabeth II Park in Christchurch. He was a member of the 1989 New Zealand tour of Great Britain and France, but did not play a Test on tour.

In 1990 he also played two Test series win over Papua New Guinea in Papua New Guinea, playing at fullback against the Kumuls in Goroka where he kicked 2 goals scoring his only Test points, and then from the bench at the Lloyd Robson Oval in Port Moresby. He was then selected on the wing for the Kiwis in their single Test against Australia at the Athletic Park in Wellington.

Edwards wasn't to see Test football again until 1993 following a season ending knee injury to regular Kiwis Test fullback Matthew Ridge while playing for Manly-Warringah. This saw coach Howie Tamati recall Edwards to the No.1 jumper which he kept throughout the year including the 0–2 1993 Trans-Tasman Test series loss to Australia in June (the first test at Mount Smart in Auckland was a 14–all draw but Australia won the last two tests 16–8 in Palmerston and 16–4 at Lang Park in Brisbane), as well as the 0–3 whitewash handed to the Kiwis by Great Britain on the 1993 New Zealand rugby league tour of Great Britain and France. To start their 1993 Britain and France tour, the Kiwis had played a test against Wales at the Vetch Field in Swansea, winning 24–19. Then came reality as the Lions won the 1st Test 17–0 at the famous Wembley Stadium in London, the 2nd Test 29–12 at Central Park in Wigan before wrapping up their series whitewash with a 29–10 win at Headingley in Leeds.

Morvin Edwards played his last test for New Zealand in their 36–11 win over France at the Stade d'Albert Domec in Carcassonne to end the 1993 tour.

== Sources ==
- Alan Whiticker & Glen Hudson (2007). The Encyclopedia of Rugby League Players. Wetherill Park, New South Wales: Gary Allen Pty Ltd. ISBN 978-1-877082-93-1.
