= Tony Kemp (rugby league) =

NZ international rugby league footballer & coach (born 1968)

Personal information
- Full name: Anthony Edward Ellis Kemp
- Born: 18 January 1968 (age 58) New Zealand

Playing information
- Height: 178 cm (5 ft 10 in)
- Weight: 98 kg (15 st 6 lb)
- Position: Fullback, Centre, Five-eighth, Lock
Club
Years	Team	Pld	T	G	FG	P
19??–85	Waitara (TRL)
1986–87	Randwick (WRL)
1986–87	Doncaster	30	26	0	1	105
1988–93	Newcastle Knights	87	20	1	0	81
1993–95	Castleford Tigers	63	27	4	3	119
1995	South Qld Crushers	8	2	15	0	38
1995–98	Leeds Rhinos	47	10	0	2	42
1999–00	Wakefield Trinity Wildcats	22	2	0	1	9
	Total	257	87	20	7	394
Representative
Years	Team	Pld	T	G	FG	P
19??–85	Taranaki
1986–87	Wellington	12	8	2	0	36
1989–95	New Zealand	25	6	0	0	36

Coaching information
Club
Years	Team	Gms	W	D	L	W%
2000	Wakefield Trinity Wildcats
2004–05	New Zealand Warriors	37	13	0	24	35
	Total	37	13	0	24	35

Tony Kemp (born 18 January 1968) is a New Zealand former rugby league test representative and former coach of the New Zealand Warriors. He is a commentator for Māori Television's coverage of the Auckland Rugby League competition and also serves as the Football Manager for the New Zealand Rugby League.

== Background ==
Kemp was born in Whangārei but raised in Waitara, and attended Waitara High School. He played rugby league for the Randwick Kingfishers in the Wellington Rugby League competition and in 1987 made the Junior Kiwis.

== Playing career ==
=== 1980s ===
In 1986/87 he joined the Doncaster for a season before taking up a professional career full-time when he joined the Newcastle Knights in 1988. During the 1988 Great Britain Lions tour Newcastle hosted a match against the visiting British national team with Kemp playing at centre and scoring a try in the Knights' 12 – 28 loss. Kemp first made the New Zealand national rugby league team in 1989. He later played for the Castleford Tigers, South Queensland Crushers, Leeds Rhinos and Wakefield Trinity Wildcats (captain). Kemp was selected to play for New Zealand at centre in all three Test matches of the 1989 Kangaroo tour of New Zealand.

=== 1990s ===
During the 1990 Great Britain Lions tour Kemp was selected to play for New Zealand in all three Test matches against the visiting British national team. Kemp was selected to play for New Zealand in the 1991 Trans-Tasman Test series making one appearance at stand-off in the first match. During the 1992 Great Britain Lions tour of Australasia Kemp was selected to play for the Kiwis at centre in both Test matches against the touring British national team, scoring a try in the first game victory. He was selected to play in all three games of the 1993 Trans-Tasman Test series. Kemp was selected to go on the 1993 New Zealand rugby league tour of Great Britain and France, playing in two Test matches. During the 1993–94 season Kemp played at stand-off and scored a drop goal in Castleford's 33–2 victory over Wigan in the 1993–94 Regal Trophy Final at Headingley, Leeds on Saturday 22 January 1994. During the 1994 Kangaroo tour of Great Britain and France, Castleford hosted a match against the Australian side with Kemp at stand-off in the Tigers' 12 – 38 loss. During the 1995 ARL season Kemp played for the South Queensland Crushers.

Kemp joined Leeds in 1995, appearing 47 times in four seasons at the club. Kemp was selected to play for New Zealand at the 1995 Rugby League World Cup. He retired having played twenty-five games for New Zealand. While at Leeds in 1998 he coached the Alliance team to a championship win. In 2000 Kemp, along with all of the other players aged over 24, had his contract with the Wakefield Trinity Wildcats terminated due to the club's financial crisis.

== Coaching career ==
After two years of playing for Wakefield Trinity Wildcats Kemp retired to take over from Andy Kelly as head coach. He helped save the club from relegation before leaving to return home to New Zealand. In 2001 Kemp became the assistant coach behind Daniel Anderson at the New Zealand Warriors. He openly said that he wanted to be the next head coach after Anderson. Kemp got his wish, taking over from Anderson when he was sacked halfway through the 2004 NRL season. Kemp was in charge for a season and a half before being sacked himself. In 2008 he was named in the Taranaki Rugby League Team of the Century.

In 2010 Kemp was appointed team manager of the New Zealand national rugby league team. In 2012 he was named in the Wellington Rugby League's Team of the Century.
