= John Holdsworth (referee) =

English rugby league referee (1947–2023)

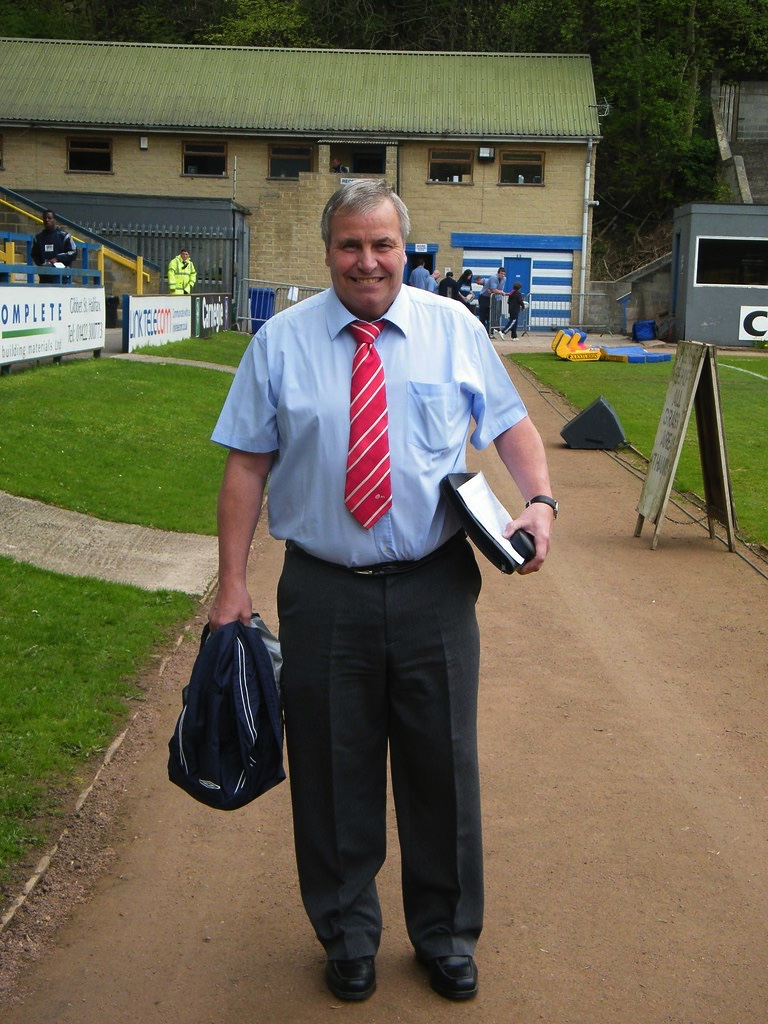
- Holdsworth in 2020

Personal information
- Born: 25 January 1947 Kippax, West Riding of Yorkshire, England
- Died: 17 February 2023 (aged 76)

Refereeing information
Years	Competition	Apps
1978–95	Rugby Football League Championship
1980–93	Internationals
- Source: As of 17 February 2023

John Holdsworth (25 January 1947 – 17 February 2023) was a rugby league referee from Kippax, West Riding of Yorkshire, England.

== Career ==
Holdsworth took charge of matches during the 1980s and 1990s, and was the referee for the 1987 World Club Challenge, and Wigan's 36–14 victory over Warrington in the 1990 Challenge Cup Final during the 1989–90 season at Wembley Stadium, London on Saturday 28 April 1990.

== International referee ==
Holdsworth refereed a number of international Test matches during his career. His first international came on 20 March 1980 when England defeated Wales 17–4 at Boothferry Park in Hull. His last test as a referee was at the Stade d'Albert Domec in Carcassonne, France on 21 November 1993 in a game which saw New Zealand defeat hosts France 36–11 as part of the Kiwis 1993 tour of Great Britain and France.

== Death ==
Holdsworth died on 17 February 2023, at the age of 76.
