= Gary Freeman (rugby league) =

New Zealand international rugby league footballer and coach

Gary Freeman MNZM
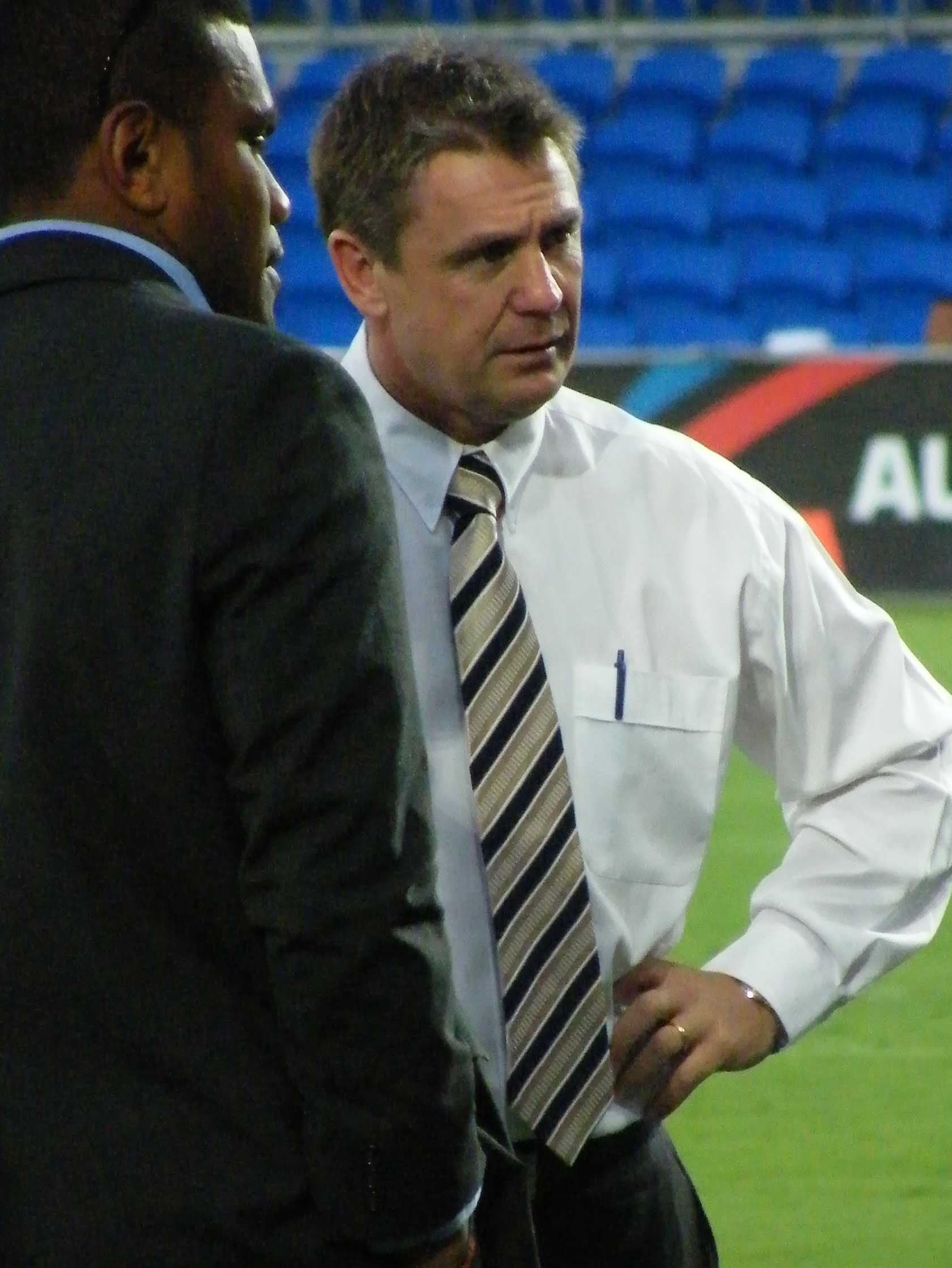
- Freeman in 2008
- Born: Gary Ross Freeman; 4 December 1962 (age 63); Auckland, New Zealand
- Rugby league career

Playing information
- Height: 175 cm (5 ft 9 in)
- Weight: 83 kg (13 st 1 lb)
- Position: Halfback
Club
Years	Team	Pld	T	G	FG	P
1981–87	Northcote Tigers
1983	Kent Invicta	9	2	0	0	8
1983–84	Castleford Tigers	17	4	0	0	16
1988–91	Balmain Tigers	51	19	0	0	76
1992–93	Eastern Suburbs	35	11	0	0	44
1994–95	Penrith Panthers	44	21	0	0	84
1996	Parramatta Eels	21	2	0	0	8
	Total	177	59	0	0	236
Representative
Years	Team	Pld	T	G	FG	P
19??–87	Auckland
1986–95	New Zealand	45	10	0	0	40

Coaching information
Representative
Years	Team	Gms	W	D	L	W%
2001–02	New Zealand	3	1	0	2	33

Gary Ross Freeman MNZM (born 4 December 1962) is a New Zealand former professional rugby league footballer who played in the 1980s and 1990s, and coached in the 2000s, who both captained and coached the New Zealand national team. He was arguably one of New Zealand's greatest Test halfbacks and at the time of his retirement he was the most-capped New Zealand test player and also held the record for most consecutive tests for New Zealand with 37.

Freeman played his club football in New Zealand for Auckland's Northcote club, in the UK for England's Kent Invicta and Castleford clubs, and in Australia for Sydney's Balmain (with whom he reached the 1988 and 1989 Grand Finals), Eastern Suburbs (with whom he won the 1992 Dally M Medal), Penrith and Parramatta clubs.

== Biography ==
Freeman was born in Auckland, New Zealand, on 4 December 1962. He played rugby league as a Bay Roskill Vikings junior.

=== Playing career ===
==== 1980s ====
In 1982, Freeman was graded by the Northcote Tigers as a nineteen-year-old in the Auckland Rugby League competition and played there for most of the 1980s, gaining representative selection for the Auckland rugby league team. He also played in England for Kent Invicta at the start of the 1983-84 season. Freeman also spent a season playing for English club Castleford. He was selected to go on the 1986 New Zealand rugby league tour of Australia and Papua New Guinea and made his debut for the Kiwis at halfback in the second Test against Australia. He was retained for the third Test against Australia and for both Tests against Papua New Guinea.

Freeman moved to Australia to play for Sydney club Balmain Tigers in the 1988 NSWRL season. During the mid-season 1988 Great Britain Lions tour, Freeman played from the bench for New Zealand in the sole Test match in Christchurch, scoring two tries that helped the Kiwis to a victory that booked their place in the final of the 1985–1988 Rugby League World Cup. Before that, however, Freeman was selected to play at halfback for the Balmain Tigers in the 1988 NSWRL Grand Final. He played for New Zealand in the halves at the 1988 World Cup final which was lost to Australia.

Freeman played in all three Tests of the 1989 Kangaroo tour of New Zealand. Later that year, he made it two consecutive Grand Finals when he again played at halfback for Balmain in the 1989 NSWRL season's Premiership decider.

==== 1990s ====
In all three Tests of the 1990 Great Britain Lions tour, Freeman was selected to play at halfback for the Kiwis. He was selected to captain New Zealand at halfback for the 1991 Trans-Tasman Test series in Australia. Freeman commenced playing for Eastern Suburbs Roosters for the 1992 NSWRL season. During the 1992 Great Britain Lions tour of Australasia, Freeman captained New Zealand from halfback in both Test matches, being named man-of-the-match in the first and scoring a try in the second. At the end of the 1992 NSWRL season, Freeman was awarded the Dally M Medal as the competition's player of the year for his performance as Eastern Suburbs' halfback.

Nicknamed "Whiz", Freeman was selected to captain the Kiwis from halfback for the 1993 Trans-Tasman Test series against Australia. He then captained the Kiwis from halfback for the 1993 New Zealand rugby league tour of Great Britain and France. For the 1994 NSWRL season, Freeman transferred to the Penrith Panthers. For the first game of the 1995 Trans-Tasman Test series, Freeman was replaced as captain of the New Zealand national team by John Lomax, but regained the position for the remaining two games. At the end of that year, he travelled with the Kiwis to the UK for the 1995 World Cup, playing his 45th and final international at hooker against Papua New Guinea.

Freeman began the 1996 ARL season as captain of his new club, the Parramatta Eels. Freeman retired from playing at the end of this season, with the Eels' captaincy being transferred to fellow Kiwi Jarrod McCracken.

=== Post-playing ===
On 31 December 1996, Freeman was included in the 1997 New Year Honours, being appointed a Member of the New Zealand Order of Merit, for services to rugby league. He later became a rugby league commentator. At the end of the 1997 Super League season, Freeman provided commentary for the Grand Final. He did the same for the 1998 Anzac Test.

==== Coaching career ====
At the close of the 2000 World Cup, in which New Zealand lost the tournament final to Australia, Freeman was selected to replace Frank Endacott as Kiwis coach. Under Freeman in 2001, New Zealand played a one-off Test match against France and defeated them 36–0 at Ericsson Stadium. The Kiwis then played Australia at the new Westpac Stadium in Wellington and lost 28–10.

Freeman was also coach for the 2002 New Zealand rugby league tour of Great Britain and France, although it was to be his last in charge of the national team. In 2003, Daniel Anderson was named as the new Kiwis coach. Freeman later became coach of the New South Wales "Young Achievers" team.

=== Later years ===
In 2007, Freeman was inducted as one of the NZRL's Legends of League. He is also an Auckland Rugby League Immortal. Freeman further worked as the co-host of Fox Sports' NRL coverage and panel member of NRL on FOX until 2011.
