= Gary Rose (rugby league) =

English rugby league footballer

Personal information
- Born: 25 July 1965 (age 59); Leeds, England

Playing information
- Position: Prop, Second-row
Club
Years	Team	Pld	T	G	FG	P
1987–88	Keighley	44	6	0	0	24
1989–93	Featherstone Rovers	106	5	0	0	20
1993–94	Leeds	28	1	0	0	4
1994–95	Hull FC	22	1	0	0	4
1996–99	Dewsbury Rams	68	2	0	0	8
	Total	268	15	0	0	60

Gary Rose (born 25 July 1965) is an English professional rugby league footballer who played in the 1980s and 1990s. He played at club level for Yew Tree ARLFC (in East End Park, Leeds), Keighley, Featherstone Rovers, Leeds, Hull FC, and the Dewsbury Rams, as a prop, or second-row.

== Background ==
Gary Rose was born in Leeds, West Riding of Yorkshire, England.

== Playing career ==
Gary Rose made his début for Featherstone Rovers on Sunday 31 December 1989, and he played his last match for Featherstone Rovers during the 1992–93 season.
