= Brent Stuart =

New Zealand rugby league footballer and coach

Personal information
- Full name: Brent Clifford Stuart
- Born: 19 August 1965 (age 61) Greymouth, West Coast Region, New Zealand

Playing information
- Position: Prop
Club
Years	Team	Pld	T	G	FG	P
19??–89	Marist (WCRL)
1990–??	Addington (CRL)
1992–93	Halifax	14	2	0	0	8
1994–96	Western Suburbs	38	2	0	0	8
	Total	52	4	0	0	16
Representative
Years	Team	Pld	T	G	FG	P
19??–89	West Coast
	South Island
1990–98	Canterbury
1992–95	New Zealand	13	1	0	0	4

Brent Clifford Stuart is a rugby league coach and former player who represented New Zealand.

== Playing career ==
Stuart was originally from the West Coast. He was educated at Marist Brothers High School, Greymouth.

A West Coast and Canterbury representative, Stuart spent two years in the Northern Territory in the mid-1980s and represented the Territory against Parramatta. He spent four months with English club Halifax during the 1992–93 season.

In 1993 he was invited to be part of an Auckland Invitational XIII side that drew 16-all with the Balmain Tigers. Stuart was then selected to go on the 1993 New Zealand rugby league tour of Great Britain and France, playing in all five test matches. He then played for the Western Suburbs Magpies in the Australian competition.

Brent Stuart was a New Zealand international and played at the 1995 Rugby League World Cup.

In 1998 he returned to play for Canterbury.

== Coaching career ==
Since 2007 Stuart has been coaching the Canterbury Bulls in New Zealand's Bartercard Premiership. Since 2008 Stuart has coached the Papanui Tigers. In 2009 he was named to coach the Bartercard Premiership Selection that took on Samoa.

Since 2010 Stuart has also coached the South Island side in the National Zonal Competition.

Canterbury's 44–16 defeat by Auckland on 4 June 2012 was Stuart's last match coaching representative football.
