= Jason Williams (rugby league, born 1966) =

New Zealand international rugby league footballer and coach

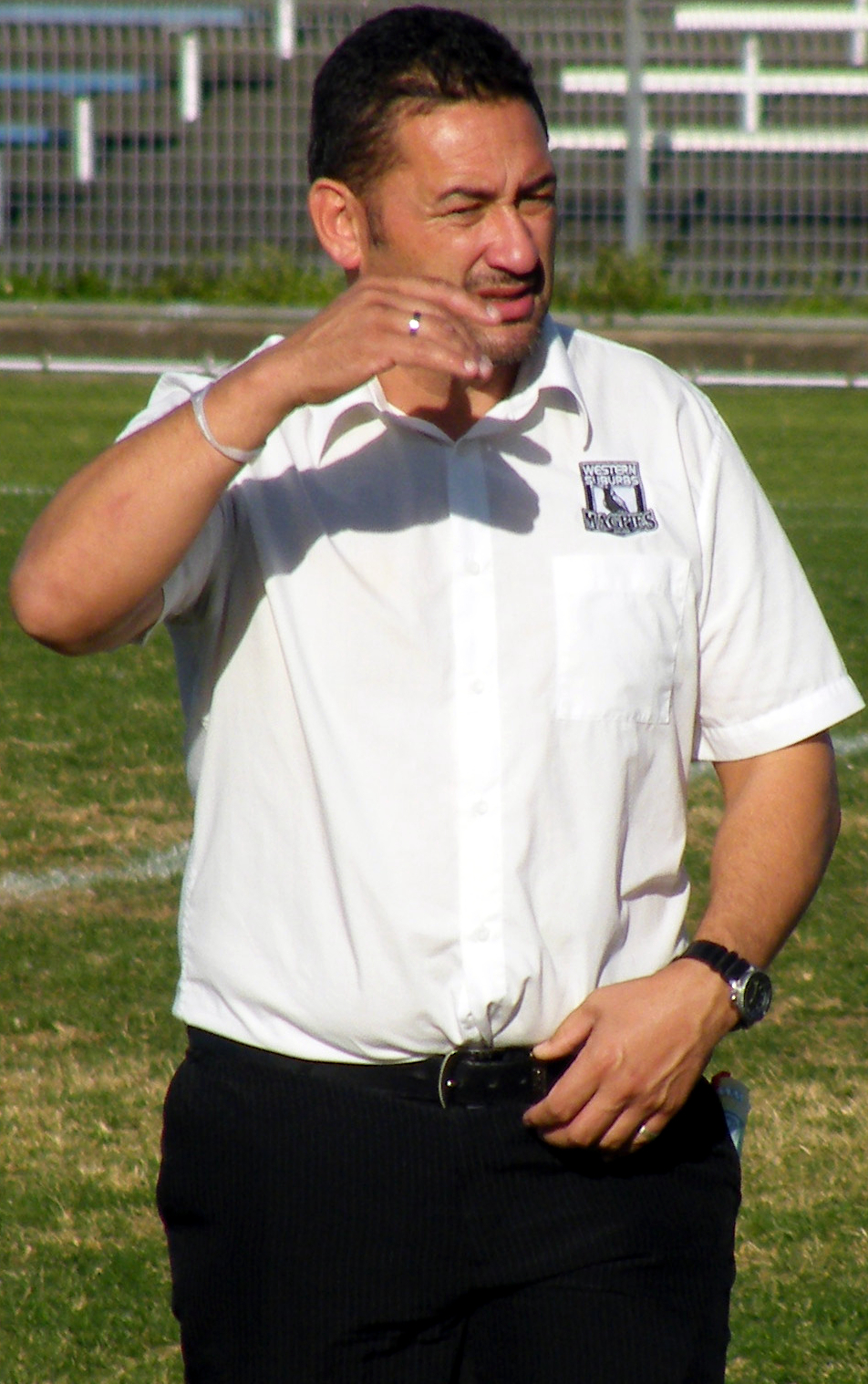

Personal information
- Full name: Jason Paul Williams
- Born: 23 April 1966 (age 59) Christchurch, New Zealand

Playing information
- Height: 181 cm (5 ft 11 in)
- Weight: 90 kg (14 st 2 lb)
- Position: Wing
Club
Years	Team	Pld	T	G	FG	P
1987	Western Suburbs	7	2	0	0	8
1988	Eastern Suburbs	8	1	0	0	4
1991	South Sydney	16	12	0	0	48
1992–95	Sydney Bulldogs	73	34	0	0	136
1994–95	Salford Reds	11	6	0	0	24
1996–98	Penrith Panthers	41	14	0	0	56
	Total	156	69	0	0	276
Representative
Years	Team	Pld	T	G	FG	P
1989–??	Canterbury
1991–95	New Zealand	12	1	0	0	4
1998	New Zealand Māori

Jason Paul Williams (born 23 April 1966) is a New Zealand former professional rugby league footballer who played in the 1980s and 1990s. A New Zealand international representative winger, he played his club football in Australia for Sydney's Western Suburbs Magpies, Eastern Suburbs Roosters, South Sydney Rabbitohs, Canterbury-Bankstown Bulldogs and the Penrith Panthers as well as in England for Salford. Williams played 145 games in the Australian competition from 1987–88 and 1991–98, scoring a total of 63 tries and winning the 1995 ARL Premiership with the Canterbury club. Williams played in 12 test matches for New Zealand between 1991 and 1995, scoring one try. He played in one non-test international on the 1993 Kiwis tour against Wales and two World Cup matches (1991, 1995).

== Background ==
Williams was born in Christchurch, New Zealand.

== Playing career ==
Jason Williams was a Christchurch junior who moved to Australia at the age of 15. He was signed by the Western Suburbs Magpies for the 1987 NSWRL season, but after a poor season which saw only 2 tries in just 7 games, Williams was released by the Magpies and he was signed by the Eastern Suburbs Roosters for the 1988 season. His time with the Roosters was similar to his season at Wests, playing only 8 games and scoring just a single try.

Following the season, Williams spent 1989 and 1990 playing in the Metropolitan Cup. He made the most of another chance when the South Sydney Rabbitohs offered him a contract for 1991, going on to play 16 games and scoring 12 tries for the season. His performances on the wing for Souths saw him make his test début for New Zealand against Australia at Olympic Park in Melbourne for the first test of the 1991 Trans-Tasman Test series, the Kiwi's upsetting the Aussies 24-8. He played all three tests of the series, won 2-1 by Australia

Now a Kiwi test player, Jason Williams was signed by Canterbury-Bankstown Chief Executive Peter "Bullfrog" Moore. Williams had to wait until the 1993 New Zealand Kiwis Tour of Great Britain and France before he was re-called into the test lineup. During the three test series against Great Britain, Williams would score his only test try in the third and final test at the Headingley Stadium in Leeds (Great Britain won the match 29-10 and the series 3-0). He then played on the wing in the final test of the tour, a 36-11 victory over France. He went on to play in 73 games for the Bulldogs between 1992 and 1995, scoring 34 tries, including scoring a 70m intercept try in Canterbury's 12-36 loss to the Canberra Raiders in the Grand Final, and on the wing in Canterbury's 17-4 Grand Final win over Manly-Warringah at the Sydney Football Stadium.

After the Grand Final loss to the Raiders, Williams spent a season in England playing for Salford, before returning to Canterbury for their 1995 premiership campaign.

Before the end of the 1995 season it was announced that Williams had signed with the Penrith Panthers for 1996 and he was promptly dropped to Reserve Grade by coach Chris Anderson after Round 17. Williams won a reprieve and was brought back into the team on the interchange bench for Canterbury's 25-6 win over Canberra in the Preliminary final before taking his place on the wing in the Grand Final victory over Manly following an injury to flying winger Brett Dallas.

Williams was selected as part of the New Zealand team for the 1995 Rugby League World Cup and played in just one game during the tournament. The game against Papua New Guinea at Knowsley Road in St. Helens, England, saw the Kiwis win 22-6 on their way to a Semi-final berth against the eventual champions, Australia.

Williams left Canterbury following the Grand Final to join Penrith for the 1996 season. He would spend three seasons at the foot of the Blue Mountains, all in three different competitions. 1996 was in the ARL's Optus Cup. 1997 was spent while the Panthers were part of the breakaway Super League competition while his last season before retirement was in the new National Rugby League in 1998.

== Coaching career ==
In 2012, Williams coached the Western Suburbs Magpies in the NSW Cup. In 2013 he joined the Wests Tigers as an assistant coach for the club's NSW Cup team.

== Sources ==
- Whiticker, Alan & Hudson, Glen (2006) The Encyclopedia of Rugby League Players, Gavin Allen Publishing, Sydney
