= Jason Donnelly =

New Zealand rugby league footballer

Personal information
- Full name: Jason Luke Donnelly
- Born: 28 June 1970 (age 55) Christchurch, New Zealand

Playing information
- Height: 183 cm (6 ft 0 in)
- Weight: 96 kg (15 st 2 lb)
- Position: Wing, Centre
Club
Years	Team	Pld	T	G	FG	P
	Frankton (WRL)
1990–91	Keighley	24	6	0	0	24
1992–96	St George Dragons	55	16	0	0	64
1997	Adelaide Rams	6	0	0	0	0
	Total	85	22	0	0	88
Representative
Years	Team	Pld	T	G	FG	P
1988	Waikato
1993	New Zealand	3	0	0	0	0

Jason Donnelly is a New Zealand former professional rugby league footballer who represented New Zealand. His position of preference was on the wing.

== Early years ==
Jason Donnelly was born on 28 June 1970. Donnelly was originally an athletics champion and was the New Zealand junior decathlon champion before rugby league took precedence.

== Playing career ==
A Waikato Rugby League player, Donnelly started his professional career in England playing for Keighley before moving to Australia. There, Donnelly played most of his career with the St George Dragons, scoring sixteen first grade tries. The Dragons made the Grand Final in both 1992 and 1993. He then later played for the Bulldogs.

In 1993 he because a New Zealand tourist and played in three test matches. While on tour in France he was injured along with Stephen Kearney when a balcony they were on collapsed.

He was linked with the new Auckland Warriors franchise in 1994 but negotiations ultimately fell through and he stayed with the Dragons. In 1997 he moved to the new Adelaide Rams side in the rebel Super League competition, playing just 6 games and scoring no tries for the club before retiring at the end of the year.
