= Gavin Hill =

NZ international rugby footballer

- Born: Gavin Hill; 11 December 1965 (age 60) Ōkato, New Zealand
- Height: 191 cm (6 ft 3 in)
- Weight: 110 kg (17 st 5 lb; 240 lb)

Rugby union career
- Position: Flanker / Number 8
Amateur team(s)
Years	Team	Apps	(Points)
1983–86	Eltham	63	(502)
1986–87	Kirwee	34	(79)
1988–90	Shirley	50	(108)
1990–91	Hutt Old Boys	48	(180)
1998-00	Oriental Rongotai	48	(91)
Senior career
Years	Team	Apps	(Points)
1998–99	Terenure College	28	(60)
2001–02	Velox Valhallians	18	(18)
Provincial / State sides
Years	Team	Apps	(Points)
1982–86	Taranaki	24	(58)
1986–90	Canterbury	25	(102)
1990–91	Wellington	43	(104)
International career
Years	Team	Apps	(Points)
1991	Māori All Blacks	1	(4)
1991	Southern Maori	1	(8)
National sevens teams
Years	Team		Comps
1984–86	Taranaki		
1986–90	Canterbury		
1990–91	Wellington		
Coaching career
- Years: Team
- 2001–02: Velox Valhallians
- 2003–04: Greytown Tuhirangi
- 2005–06: Oriental Rongotai
- 2007: Greytown Tuhirangi
- 2008: College Rifles
- Auckland Storm
- Rugby league career

Playing information
- Position: Prop, Second-row
Club
Years	Team	Pld	T	G	FG	P
1992–93	Canterbury Bulldogs	43				210
1993	Featherstone Rovers	8				15
1994	Waikato	16				164
1995–96	Auckland Warriors	14				18
1997	Northcote
	Total	81	0	0	0	407
Representative
Years	Team	Pld	T	G	FG	P
1992–96	NZ Kiwis	8				24
1994	NZ Residents	4				42
1996	NZ Māori	2				12
1996	NZ Nines	6				16

Gavin Lyle Hill (born 11 December 1965) is a New Zealand former rugby union and rugby league footballer who played in the 1980s, 1990s and 2000s, and coached rugby union the 2000s. He resided in Wellington for 10-years before moving back to Auckland in 2008 to take a coaching position in the Air New Zealand Cup.

He was a flanker and number eight in rugby union and then a prop/second-row in league when he switched codes in 1991. In both rugby and league he was unusual, being a forward who kicked goals. Hill was also a promising fast bowler and belligerent batsman in cricket for both Taranaki and Canterbury before rugby took over his career.

== Rugby union ==
He originally played rugby union as a flanker for the Taranaki, Canterbury and Wellington. He also represented the New Zealand Māori Team. Hill returned to rugby union in 1998 and played out the rest of his playing career in Wellington and alternating in the off seasons to Europe and Canada playing club rugby. He first made a name for himself as a 17-year-old when beat the cream of New Zealand rugby in a national goal kicking competition. Participants included Grant Fox, Richard Wilson, Mark Finlay, Allan Hewson, Richard Dunn and Robbie Deans – notable for being All Blacks. Hill comes from a prominent sporting family – 5 of his great uncles (Warbrick) were part of the first ever New Zealand team to leave New Zealand (1884 Native team). One of those brothers – Joe Warbrick went on to become an All Black and play a major part in the beginnings of All Black rugby. Other notables were the famous All Black lock cum flanker during the 1950s Stan "Tiny" Hill who later went on to be an All Black selector. Tiny's two sons' Stan and John went on to represent New Zealand in Basketball and Stans' son Ben now is a current Tall Black. Hills father Brian was a prominent flanker for Taranaki and another uncle – Greg Hill played for the New Zealand Armed Services and Wanganui. His brother David was a New Zealand Armed Services representative. Another cousin Wayne Hill was a New Zealand Colt and prominent winger for North Harbour and Auckland during the 1980s. Hill coached club rugby in the Wairarapa domestic club competition. He is now residing in Auckland coaching the Auckland Storm in the Air New Zealand Cup for 2008.

== Rugby league ==
He switched to rugby league in 1992, as union was not professional at that time. He played for the Canterbury Bankstown Bulldogs (1992–93), Featherstone Rovers (1993), Waikato Cougars (1994), Auckland Warriors (1995–96) and for the New Zealand Kiwis (1992–96) national side. He also represented New Zealand national rugby league team in the 1996 World Champion nines side in Fiji, the New Zealand Residents in 1994 and the New Zealand Māori league team notable for defeating the British Lions team and Papua New Guinea teams in 1996. After Hill finished with the Auckland Warriors, he played a season in the domestic club competition in Auckland with the Northcote Tigers before he moved to Wellington and returned to rugby union successfully. Hill's transition from rugby union to rugby league was even more remarkable because he is one of the few forwards in rugby union to successfully make the switch. Hill made the New Zealand Kiwis only after three games of rugby league for the Canterbury Bankstown Bulldogs.
