= Matthew Ridge =

New Zealand international dual code rugby footballer and TV broadcaster

Personal information
- Full name: Matthew John Ridge
- Born: 27 August 1968 (age 58) Rotorua, New Zealand

Playing information
- Height: 181 cm (5 ft 11 in)
- Weight: 92 kg (14 st 7 lb)

Rugby union
- Position: Fullback
Club
Years	Team	Pld	T	G	FG	P
	Ponsonby
Representative
Years	Team	Pld	T	G	FG	P
1988–89	Auckland
1989–90	New Zealand Colts

Rugby league
- Position: Fullback
Club
Years	Team	Pld	T	G	FG	P
1990–96	Manly Sea Eagles	122	32	477	11	1093
1997–99	Auckland Warriors	37	8	103	0	238
	Total	159	40	580	11	1331
Representative
Years	Team	Pld	T	G	FG	P
1990–98	New Zealand	25	6	71	2	168

Matthew John Ridge (born 27 August 1968) is a New Zealand television presenter, and a former rugby union and rugby league footballer.

A fullback in both codes, Ridge played rugby union for Auckland and became an All Black, but never won an international cap. He turned professional in 1990 with the Manly-Warringah Sea Eagles of the New South Wales Rugby League, and was one of two Manly-Warringah Sea Eagles to sign with the Super League which led to him winning the 1996 ARL Premiership. He later captained the Auckland Warriors and New Zealand national team (the Kiwis). An accurate goal-kicker, he set several scoring records in rugby league.

He is now best known for his work in television alongside his partner Marc Ellis in shows including Game of Two Halves and Marc & Matthew's Rocky Road to….

== Rugby union career ==
Before his well-known "defection" to rugby league, Ridge had a brief but significant rugby union. He attended Auckland Grammar School and advanced through the representative ranks, landing a spot on the New Zealand Secondary Schools team in 1986 and then the New Zealand Colts in 1988 and 1989.

At the age of 19, he made his first-class debut for Auckland in 1988 when he replaced the injured Lindsay Harris in a historic Ranfurly Shield defence against Canterbury. Ridge had established himself as Auckland's undisputed first-choice fullback by 1989, and national selectors were drawn to his fearless defensive play and offensive flair. He demonstrated the scoring instincts that would later define his professional career by scoring 11 tries in 18 games during the 1989 season alone while he was with Auckland.

The highlight of his union career came in late 1989 when he was selected for the All Blacks tour of Canada, Ireland, and Wales. As All Black number 903, he played six matches on the tour against various club and provincial sides, including Cardiff, Swansea, and Ulster. Despite his success in those fixtures-which included scoring a try against Swansea-he remained the understudy to the great John Gallagher and did not receive an official international Test cap. It was during this time that Ridge honed his goal-kicking skills, often training alongside the master kicker Grant Fox for hours, although this particular talent went largely unrequired in high-level union matches. In 1990, just as he was poised to become the next great All Black fullback, he shocked all by signing a professional contract with the Manly-Warringah Sea Eagles, thereby ending his union career at the age of 21.

== Rugby league career ==
Despite never having played a game of rugby league in his life, Ridge was signed by the Manly-Warringah Sea Eagles and their Kiwi coach Graham Lowe to play in the New South Wales Rugby League's Winfield Cup competition from mid-1990 (according to Ridge in a 2024 podcast, he signed for AU$35,000 for his first half year and that would increase to $60,000 from 1991 while getting $2,000 for a win and $1,000 for a loss. At the time he was only on $15 a day and described himself as "poor" and openly said he switched codes for the money). Ridge made his debut at fullback for the Sea Eagles in their Round 10 clash with Cronulla at Manly's home ground, Brookvale Oval. He became the team's first choice goal kicker ahead of captain and dual rugby international Michael O'Connor and part-time kicker Mal Cochrane when he kicked 6/7 in his first game helping 10th placed Manly to a 24–8 win over the third-placed Cronulla Sharks. Ridge ended the 1990 season as Manly's leading scorer with 94 points (2 tries, 43/57 goals) in 11 games.

Just six games into his rugby league career, Ridge played his first test for New Zealand against the touring Great Britain Lions. He made his test debut in the 2nd test played at the Mount Smart Stadium in Auckland, displacing Manly team mate Darrell Williams in the No.1 jumper (Williams was moved to the centres). Although the Kiwis lost the match 14–16 and subsequently the series, Ridge established himself as the Kiwis first choice kicker whenever he played, kicking 5/8 on debut. He would kick another 6/7 in the 3rd and last test in Christchurch as the Kiwis salvaged some pride with a 21–18 win.

Despite good form for Manly in 1991, Ridge missed selection for the mid-season Trans-Tasman Test series against Australia due to a dispute over compensation between clubs and the New Zealand Rugby League (NZRL) which also ruled out Daryl Halligan, John Schuster and Kurt Sherlock.

Ridge's 'defection' from rugby union to rugby league was the subject of a TV documentary, In a Different League. It was hosted and narrated by his friend and former teammate John Kirwan who himself switched to league with the Auckland Warriors in 1995. The documentary, broadcast in 1991, showed Ridge's early days with Manly and his introduction to test football with the New Zealand team, as well as the reaction when All Blacks first choice fullback John Gallagher also switched to league a week after Ridge when he signed for famous English club Leeds.

After an injury-interrupted 1992 season when Ridge regained his place as the Kiwis' fullback for the two tests against the touring Great Britain team, the 1993 season started solidly. However a serious knee injury against Balmain in Round 10 of the season would rule him out until 1994. This would also see him miss selection in the mid-season tests against Australia as well as the Kiwis end of season tour of Great Britain and France.

Ridge returned to form in 1994, playing 23 games for Manly and scoring 234 points (5 tries, 106/132 goals) for the season. He also regained the Kiwi #1 jumper when he was selected for the two tests against Papua New Guinea in October.

Ridge finished the 1995 ARL season as the league's top point-scorer with a club record 257 points (11 tries, 106 goals and 1 field goal), breaking Graham Eadie's record of 242 points. At the end of the season he played for the Sea Eagles at fullback in their 4–17 Grand final loss against the Sydney Bulldogs. Ridge captained the New Zealand team at the 1995 Rugby League World Cup in England and Wales.

In 1996, Ridge a prominent supporter of Super League in the dispute which split the sport, sat out nine weeks of the season when the new competition was put on hold. However, Manly won the ARL Grand Final, defeating the Dragons, with Ridge playing a major part. In 1997, Ridge moved to the Auckland Warriors who had switched to the Super League during the Super League war.

Along the way, he set the Sea Eagles' records for single season scoring (257 points in 1995 from 11 tries, 106 goals and 1 field goal), and points in a match – 30 points (2 tries, 11 goals) against Western Suburbs in 1996.

Ridge spent the 1997 Super League season as captain of the Warriors, though injuries kept him to just 9 games.

In 1998 he wrote an autobiography with Angus Gillies, Take No Prisoners, published by Hodder Moa Beckett. He continued as captain of the Warriors in the 1998 NRL season and he captained New Zealand, kicking 3 goals in their victory over Australia in the 1998 ANZAC Test. Ridge retained the Warriors' captaincy for the first half of their 1999 season. However, in the 1999 season he was sent off and suspended three times, missing twelve weeks, and he retired after the season.

In total he scored 238 points in 37 first grade games for the New Zealand Warriors between 1997 and his retirement in 1999 (8 tries, 103 goals). At the time of his retirement he was the all-time top scorer in international matches for the New Zealand national rugby league team with 168 points (6 tries, 71 goals) from 25 test appearances.

== Post-playing career ==
In 2002, Matthew Ridge was chosen to host the original New Zealand version of television game show The Chair which first broadcast on ABC in January 2002 in the United States hosted by former tennis champion John McEnroe.

Ridge later became a television presenter, working with his partner Marc Ellis in various sports-related shows like 'Game of Two Halves', and 'Marc & Matthew's Rocky Road to ...'. In 2021 he presented a TV series Designing Dreams on six New Zealand architects: Roger Walker, Pip Cheshire, Julie Stout, Nicholas Dalton, Anna Maria Chin and Michael O'Sullivan.

He was involved in a car accident in 2009, fracturing his pelvis and hip.

== Personal life ==
Ridge's first wife was Sally Ridge, an interior designer and television presenter for TVNZ's Homefront. In November 2010, Ridge and his then-partner Carly Binding had a son, London Luca Ridge. In December 2017, Ridge and his second wife Chloe Alexa Liggins also had a son.

== See also ==
- List of New Zealand television personalities
