= Se'e Solomona =

Former NZ & Samoa international rugby league footballer

Personal information
- Full name: Maseese David Solomona
- Born: 9 March 1965 (age 61) New Zealand

Playing information
- Height: 193 cm (6 ft 4 in)
- Weight: 123 kg (19 st 5 lb)
- Position: Prop
Club
Years	Team	Pld	T	G	FG	P
19??	Richmond Bulldogs
19??	Glenora Bears
1986–89	Sheffield Eagles
1991–92	Widnes	14	2	0	0	8
1992–94	Oldham	42	2	0	0	8
1995	Auckland Warriors	9	0	0	0	0
1996	North Qld Cowboys	4	0	0	0	0
	Total	69	4	0	0	16
Representative
Years	Team	Pld	T	G	FG	P
1988–93	Auckland	21
1993	New Zealand	4	0	0	0	0
1990–95	Western Samoa	2	0	0	0	0

Maseese (Se'e) David Solomona (born 9 March 1965) is a New Zealand former professional rugby league footballer who represented both New Zealand and Western Samoa.

== Background ==
Solomona was born in New Zealand.

== Playing career ==
Solomona started his career with the Richmond Bulldogs, and the Glenora Bears, playing 21 games for Auckland between 1988 and 1993. Solomona spent 1989 with the Canterbury-Bankstown Bulldogs as part of the New Zealand Rugby League's "Rookie Scheme".

Solomona played the majority of his career in England. He played for Oldham from 1992 to 1994. before returning home to play for the Auckland Warriors in their début season in the Australian Rugby League competition. He spent 1996 with the North Queensland Cowboys, and still resides in Australia.

== Representative career ==
Solomona represented the Kiwi Colts in 1991.

His four tests for the New Zealand national rugby league team came in 1993. He also represented Western Samoa at the 1990 Pacific Cup, and in the 1995 World Cup.

== Personal life ==
Se'e Solomona is the father of the rugby league footballer who has played for the North Queensland club and has represented the Queensland Under-19s as a centre in 2003, and the Queensland Country side in 2007; Wallace Solomona, and he is the uncle of Malo Solomona.
