= Bradley Clyde =

Australia international rugby league footballer

Brad Clyde
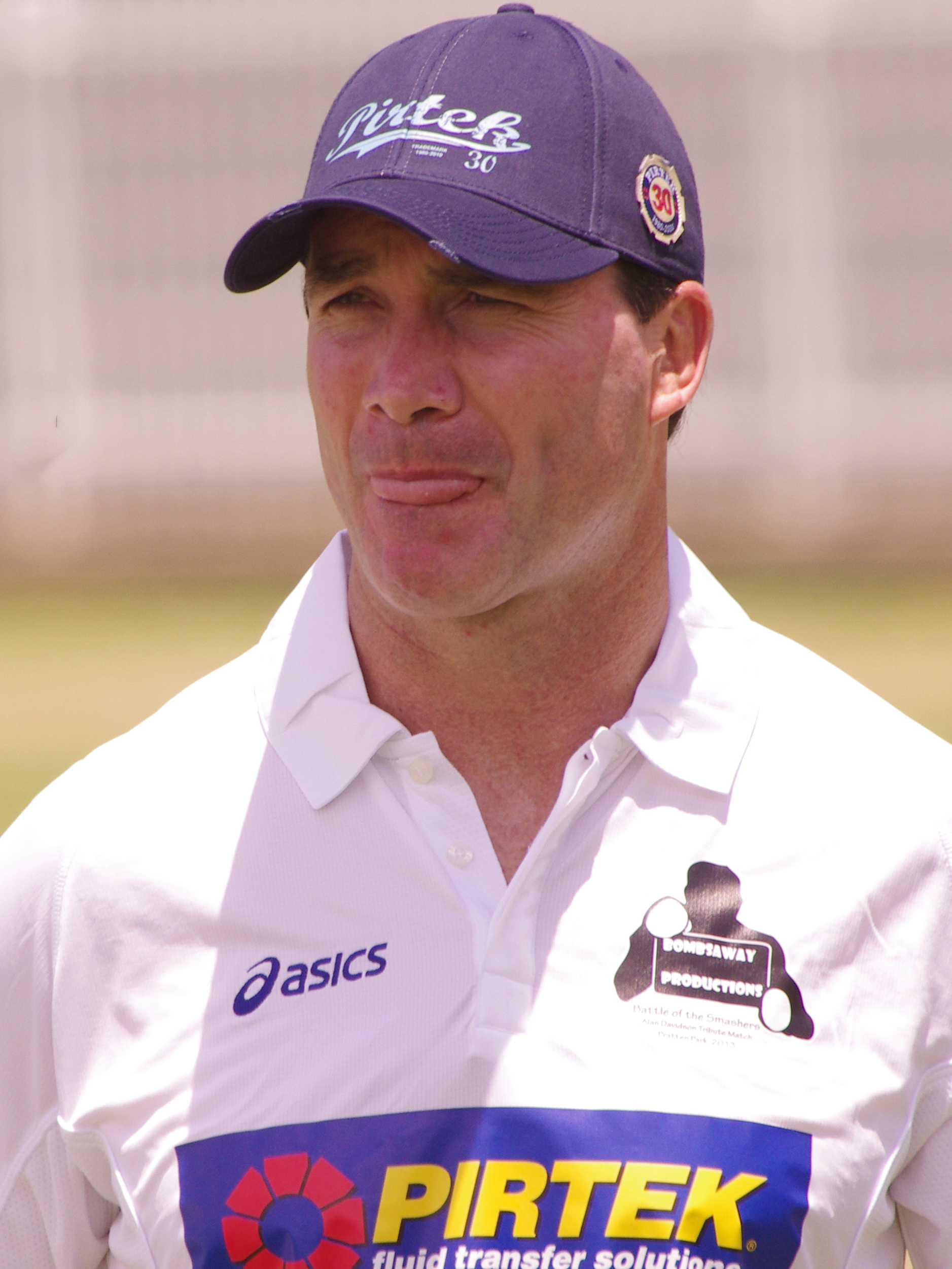
- Clyde c. 2013

Personal information
- Full name: Bradley Clyde
- Born: 27 January 1970 (age 56) Culcairn, New South Wales, Australia
- Height: 186 cm (6 ft 1 in)
- Weight: 99 kg (15 st 8 lb)

Playing information
- Position: Lock, Second-row
Club
Years	Team	Pld	T	G	FG	P
1988–98	Canberra Raiders	178	38	0	0	156
1999–00	Canterbury Bulldogs	36	8	0	0	32
2001	Leeds Rhinos	15	4	0	0	16
	Total	229	50	0	0	204
Representative
Years	Team	Pld	T	G	FG	P
1989–90	NSW City	2	0	0	0	0
1989–94	New South Wales	12	2	0	0	8
1992–94	NSW Country	2	1	0	0	4
1997	New South Wales (SL)	2	0	0	0	0
1989–94	Australia	19	6	0	0	24
1997	Australia (SL)	2	0	0	0	0

Bradley Clyde (born 27 January 1970) is an Australian former professional rugby league footballer who played in the 1980s, 1990s and 2000s who, at the peak of his playing career was widely acknowledged as the best lock in the game. He represented both New South Wales, and played for the Australian national side, and played his club football in Australia for the Canberra Raiders and Canterbury-Bankstown Bulldogs, and in England for Leeds Rhinos.

Clyde is one of only three players, along with Billy Slater and Nathan Cleary, to have twice won the Clive Churchill Medal as the best player in the Grand Final.

Bradley Clyde is an inductee into both the NSW Blues Hall of Fame and the NRL Hall of Fame.

== Early life and junior football ==
Clyde was born in Culcairn, New South Wales but was raised in Canberra, Australian Capital Territory where his parents were from.

Clyde began playing Australian rules football with West Canberra in the ACTAFL and dreamed of playing for the Collingwood Football Club in the Australian Football League. Once he started playing rugby league at school, his mother asked him to make a decision to choose between the codes due to the cost. He began his football career playing in the local ACT competition for the Belconnen United Sharks and was an Australian Schoolboy Representative in 1985,1986 and 1987. While attending Hawker College, Clyde played for the Australian Schoolboys team in 1986 and 1987. It was during this time that he decided to focus on rugby league.

In 1988, Clyde was graded by the Canberra Raiders, winning the club's rookie of the year award, and soon established himself as an indispensable player for the club. He played in three Grand finals (1989, 1991 and 1994) and was the recipient of the Clive Churchill Medal for the Best and Fairest Player in the Grand Final twice (1989 and 1991). Along with Brad Mackay (St George in 1993), Daly Cherry-Evans (Manly in 2013), and Jack Wighton (Canberra in 2019), he is also one of only four players to win the Clive Churchill Medal whilst on a losing Grand Final side (1991).

He was also a member of Canberra's premiership winning sides of 1989 (also winning the club's player of the year award that year). In the 1989 post season, he travelled with the Raiders to England for the 1989 World Club Challenge which was lost 30–18 to the 1988–89 Rugby Football League champions Widnes at the Old Trafford stadium in Manchester, England.

Clyde's 1990 season ended when he tore his anterior cruciate ligament in a Round 20 match against the Eastern Suburbs Roosters at Henson Park. This proved to be a double whammy for Clyde as it caused him to not only miss Canberra's 18–14 win over the Penrith Panthers in the Grand Final, but his injury meant his unavailability for the 1990 Kangaroo tour of Great Britain and France for which he would otherwise have been considered a certain selection.

Clyde returned to the field in Round 7 of the 1991 season, and his form quickly returned. He went on to play in the Raiders 19–12 loss to Penrith the Grand Final. He then started for Canberra in their 36–12 win over Canterbury in the 1994 Grand Final. At the end of the 1994 NSWRL season, he was selected for the 1994 Kangaroo tour. In a career spanning eleven seasons with the Raiders, Clyde scored 39 tries in a total of 178 games.

Clyde moved from the Raiders to the Bulldogs in 1999, playing with the Belmore (Sydney) based club and scoring 8 tries in 36 games.

English Super League club Leeds Rhinos signed Clyde on a two-year deal starting in 2001. He moved to the club alongside fellow Australians Brett Mullins and Tonie Carroll, finishing his playing career there.

== Representative career ==
He made 12 appearances for New South Wales in State of Origin games between 1989 and 1994 at lock forward. During his State of Origin career, Brad scored 2 tries for a total of 8 points. He was well regarded as a Clyde was recalled to the New South Wales team for the 1999 series but a horse-riding accident in a team bonding exercise before the series opener ruled him out for eight weeks with a damaged shoulder.

He represented the Kangaroos in 19 Tests over five years scoring six tries. He was named Man-of-the Series in 1989 with his debut tour v New Zealand. Injury in 1990 would prevent him from playing in the mid-season test against France in Parkes, however, his anterior cruciate ligament (ACL) knee injury suffered in Round 20 of the NSWRL season would prevent his selection for the one off Test against New Zealand at the Athletic Park stadium in Wellington (played only a week after his knee injury), as well as the 1990 Kangaroo tour.

Clyde returned to the Australian team for the 1991 Trans-Tasman Test series against New Zealand where he was one of Australia's best in the 2–1 series win. After starring in the 1991 Grand Final loss, Clyde was named as vice-captain of the Australian team for the tour of Papua New Guinea at the end of the year and was named Man of the Series also.

During the 1992 Great Britain Lions tour of Australia and New Zealand, he helped Australia retain The Ashes, and was awarded the Harry Sunderland Medal for the Player of the Series. He was also selected to play at lock for Australia in the 1992 Rugby League World Cup final at London's Wembley Stadium following the 1992 NSWRL season. Although Australia retained its World Champions crown with a 10–6 win over Great Britain, Clyde had an unhappy game after dislocating his shoulder midway through the second half.

== Post-playing ==
Bradley Clyde is an inductee into the NRL Hall of Fame and also the NSW Blues Hall of Fame alongside Bob Fulton, Andrew Johns, Ron Coote, Laurie Daley, Bob McCarthy, and Brad Fittler.

Clyde is also an inductee into the ACT Sports Hall of Fame and the Albury-Wodonga Sports Hall of Fame. He was recognised by the Australian Government for his contribution to Rugby League by being awarded the Australian Sports Medal.

In 2002, Clyde was named in a 90s Team of the Decade. In 2005, on the 25th anniversary of State of Origin, he was named by Rugby League Week as one of NSW's 25 greatest players.

Clyde also made a cameo appearance in the 2006 film, Footy Legends.

In February 2008, Clyde was named in the list of Australia's 100 Greatest Players (1908–2007) which was commissioned by the NRL and ARL to celebrate the code's centenary year in Australia.

Also following retirement Clyde served on the NRL Match Review Committee, the NRL Judiciary, and on the NRL Anti-Doping Tribunal.
