= Tawera Nikau =

Former NZ & NZ Māori international rugby league footballer

Tawera Nikau MNZM
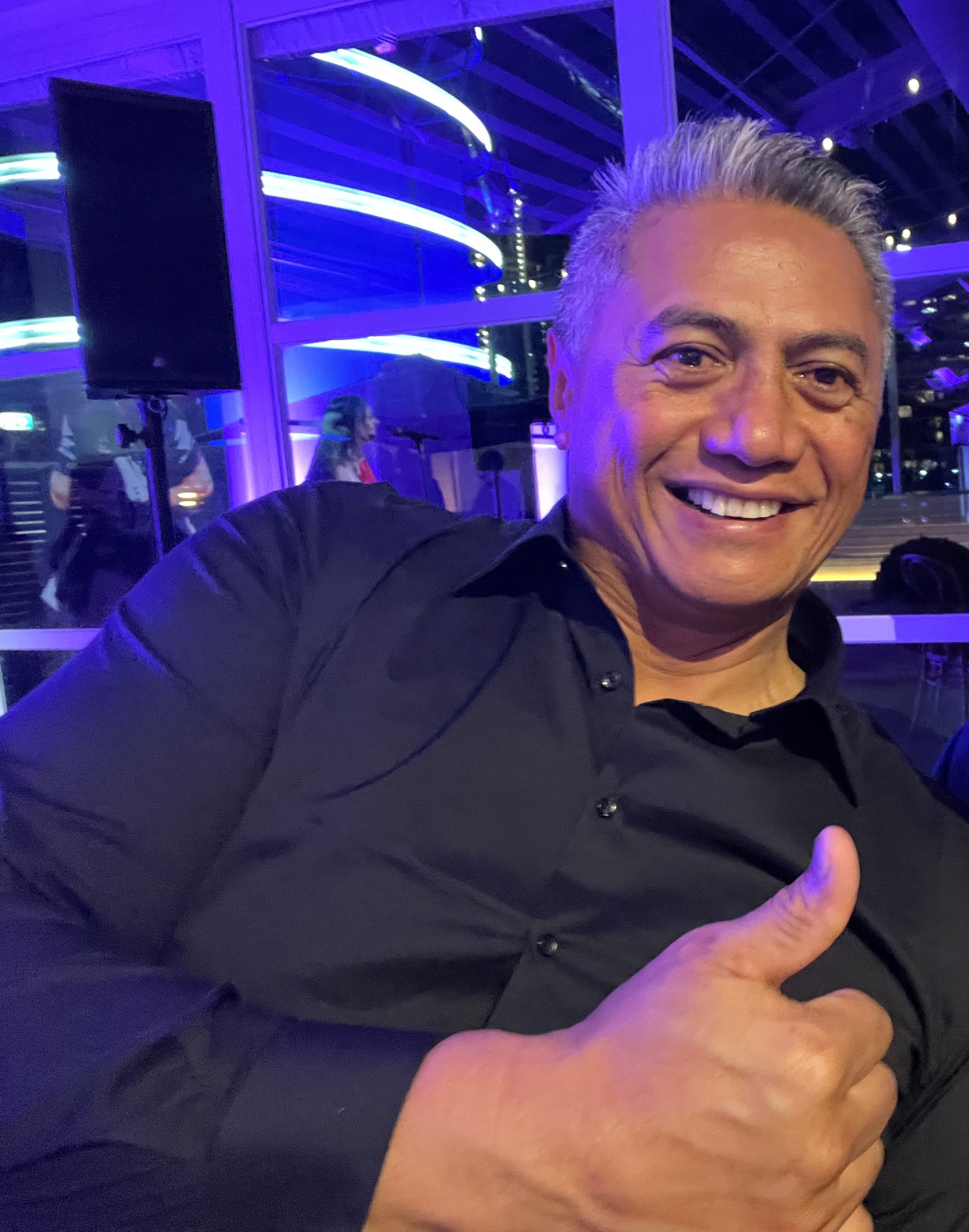
- Nikau in 2023
- Born: 1 January 1967 (age 59); Huntly, New Zealand
- Rugby league career

Playing information
- Position: Lock
Club
Years	Team	Pld	T	G	FG	P
1988–90	Canterbury-Bankstown	10	5	0	0	20
1990–91	Ryedale York	25	3	0	0	12
1991–96	Castleford Tigers	164	25	0	0	100
1995–97	Cronulla Sharks	67	7	0	0	28
1998–99	Melbourne Storm	53	8	0	0	32
2000–01	Warrington Wolves	59	9	0	0	36
	Total	378	57	0	0	228
Representative
Years	Team	Pld	T	G	FG	P
1986–87	Waikato	14	2	0	0	8
1989–93	Auckland	22	7	0	0	28
1990–97	New Zealand	19	4	0	0	16
1990–00	New Zealand Māori	8	1	0	0	4
2008	Pacific Island Barbarians (Wheelchair)

Coaching information
Representative
Years	Team	Gms	W	D	L	W%
2004–05	New Zealand Māori	0	0	0	0

Tawera Nuieia Nikau MNZM (born 1 January 1967) is a New Zealand former professional rugby league footballer who played in the 1990s and 2000s. A New Zealand international representative forward, he played club football at a number of different clubs in New Zealand, England and Australia during his career, including the Melbourne Storm's victory in the 1999 NRL season Grand Final.

== Early years ==
Nikau was born in Huntly, New Zealand. He began his career playing rugby league for the Otara Scorpions and rugby union for the East Tamaki Rugby Union club in Auckland before his family moved to the Waikato.

== Playing career ==
A Waikato and Auckland representative, Nikau played his early club football for the Otahuhu Leopards, Sheffield Eagles, York Wasps (1990-1) and Castleford Tigers. Tawera Nikau played loose forward in New Zealand's 0–17 defeat by Great Britain at Wembley Stadium on Saturday 16 October 1993. Tawera Nikau played loose forward in Castleford's 12–28 defeat by Wigan in the 1992 Challenge Cup Final during the 1991–92 season at Wembley Stadium, London on Saturday 2 May 1992, in front of a crowd of 77,386. Tawera Nikau played loose forward in Castleford Tigers' 33–2 victory over Wigan in the 1993–94 Regal Trophy Final during the 1993–94 season at Headingley, Leeds on Saturday 22 January 1994. He spent the 1988 season with the Canterbury Bulldogs on the New Zealand Rugby League's "Rookie Scheme". Having already spent several seasons playing in England, during which time he earned representative honours for New Zealand, from 1996 to 1999, Nikau played in the Australian NRL, spending the 1996–1997 with the Cronulla Sharks, losing the 1997 Super League Grand Final to the Broncos in Brisbane. He joined the Melbourne Storm team in its 1998 inaugural year, helping the team reach a third-place finish in the minor premiership. Melbourne also did well the following season and Nikau played as a lock in the 1999 NRL Grand Final victory over the St. George-Illawarra Dragons. Nikau's performance has been credited with sparking Melbourne's second-half comeback. From 1999 to 2001, Nikau was under contract with Super League franchise, the Warrington Wolves.

As a player, he was known for his high energy, fearless charges and his sometimes terrifying facial expressions while playing. In defense he was often seen to be "everywhere"; making a tackle on one side of the field and the following the ball to complete a tackle on the other.

Nikau suffered a personal tragedy on 5 April 2001, when his wife Letitia died by suicide. After taking some time from rugby to spend with his children in New Zealand, Nikau completed the season. He won in a charity boxing match in June 2002 against Samoan rugby union footballer Peter Fatialofa, supporting the Yellow Ribbon Fight for Life to prevent youth suicide.

== Representative career ==
Between 1989 and 1997 Nikau was a New Zealand national rugby league team representative, although his international career was hindered by a dispute with Richie Blackmore that resulted in his refusal to play in the same side as Blackmore.

Nikau toured with the New Zealand Māori side in 1996 and 1998 and played at the 1986 Pacific Cup.

Nikau attended the 2000 World Cup as captain of the Aotearoa Māori side.

In 2008, Nikau was part of the Pacific Island Barbarians team at the Wheelchair Rugby League World Cup.

== Coaching & RL Administration ==
In 2004 Nikau was the inaugural coach of the Waicoa Bay Stallions in the Bartercard Cup. In 2004 and 2005 he coached the New Zealand Māori rugby league team.

In November 2006, Tawera was appointed New Zealand and Islander Liaison Officer with the South Sydney Rabbitohs.

In 2010 Nikau was appointed a New Zealand national rugby league team selector for two years. Nikau also completed the New York City Marathon with Frank Bunce.

In 2011 he was added as a consultant to the board of directors of the newly formed USARL.

== Later years ==
In 2003 Nikau had a motorcycle accident which resulted in an amputation of his right leg. Nevertheless, he participated in the 2004 Yellow Ribbon Fight for Life, defeating Tea Ropati. In that same year, his athletic career to date and the details of the tragedies he had survived were described in the biography Standing Tall.

In 2012, Nikau was found guilty of assaulting his estranged daughter Heaven-Leigh outside the Huntly police station, he was convicted and fined after he failed to get a discharge without conviction. This conviction was later quashed on appeal.

Nikau previously worked for Māori Television and previously provided NRL match commentary for Sky Sports. He is the chief executive of Aotearoa Construction and owner and managing director of Team One Corporate Development, a training company.

In 2022, Nikau was the coach that led the Rugby League team in Match Fit 2 in 2022 after the Rugby Union team was unable to secure an alumni match with the Wallabies alumni due to border restrictions in place due to COVID-19 pandemic. They also played a two-day multisport tournament instead of full contact rugby due to social-distancing concerns.

In 2023, Nikau participated in season 3 of Match Fit, where former rugby league players return to play against the Australian counterparts. He officially joined in the first season that featured former rugby league stars as the Head Coach. He also admitted that he started becoming a heavy drinker after 2001 when he lost his wife.

In 2024, Nikau returned in Nikau participated in season 4 of Match Fit, where former rugby league players return to play against the All Black alumni. He is the Head Coach and narrator for the series.

== Honours and awards ==
In the 2006 Queen's Birthday Honours, Nikau was appointed a Member of the New Zealand Order of Merit, for services to rugby league and the community.

In 2008 Nikau was inducted as one of the NZRL Legends of League.

Nikau is also a Tigers Hall Of Fame Inductee.

He won a Sir Peter Blake Leadership Award for emerging leaders in 2011.

In 2023, Nikau was inducted as a life member of the Melbourne Storm.
