= Quentin Pongia =

NZ international rugby league footballer (1970–2019)

Personal information
- Full name: Quentin Lee Pongia
- Born: 9 July 1970 Christchurch, Canterbury, New Zealand
- Died: 18 May 2019 (aged 48) Greymouth, New Zealand

Playing information
- Height: 182 cm (6 ft 0 in)
- Weight: 102 kg (16 st 1 lb)
- Position: Prop
Club
Years	Team	Pld	T	G	FG	P
1993–97	Canberra Raiders	74	3	0	0	12
1998	Auckland Warriors	18	0	0	0	0
1999–01	Sydney Roosters	43	3	0	0	12
2003	St George Illawarra	2	0	0	0	0
2003	Villeneuve Leopards
2003–04	Wigan Warriors	30	0	0	0	0
	Total	167	6	0	0	24
Representative
Years	Team	Pld	T	G	FG	P
1992–00	New Zealand	35	2	0	0	8
- Relatives: Brendon Pongia (brother); Jim Calder (grandfather)

Quentin Lee Pongia (9 July 1970 – 18 May 2019) was a New Zealand rugby league footballer who represented New Zealand in the 1990s and 2000s.

== Background ==
He was the grandson of fellow Kiwi international Jim Calder. His sister Megan Tahapeehi has represented the Kiwi Ferns, and his older brother Brendon represented New Zealand as a professional basketball player.

== Playing career ==
Originally from the West Coast, Pongia transferred east in 1988. He registered and played for the Riccarton Knights Rugby League Football Club in the Canterbury Rugby League competition, representing the province in 1991 and 1992.

Pongia later played for the Canberra Raiders, and was part of the 1994 Grand Final winning premiership team. He also became a New Zealand international and was selected to go on the 1993 New Zealand rugby league tour of Great Britain and France, playing in all five test matches. He played at the 1995 Rugby League World Cup. Pongia played for the Auckland Warriors and was the NZRL player of the year in 1998. He joined the Sydney Roosters of the National Rugby League before heading to France. Pongia went to France as player coach of Paris Chattilon, but it didn't work out and he moved to Villeneuve, winning both the Championship and the Lord Derby Cup with the club.

In 2003, after the French season had finished, Pongia returned to Australia and played two matches for the St. George Illawarra Dragons. He then finished his career in England playing for the Wigan Warriors. Pongia played for the Wigan Warriors at prop forward in the 2003 Super League Grand Final which was lost to the Bradford Bulls. He was forced to retire from rugby league after it was discovered that he suffered from hepatitis B.

== Post playing ==
In 2009 Pongia was the strength and conditioning coach for the Canberra Raiders Toyota Cup (Under-20s) team. He was promoted to assistant coach for the Raiders National Rugby League team for the 2010 season. During the 2009 Four Nations Pongia was an assistant trainer and mentor for the New Zealand national rugby league team. He was replaced as a Raiders assistant coach for the 2012 season by Justin Morgan.

Quentin Pongia was the wellbeing officer for the Manly-Warringah Sea Eagles in 2017.

== Death ==
Pongia died of bowel cancer on 18 May 2019 in Greymouth, at the age of 48.
