= Daryl Halligan =

NZ international rugby league & union footballer

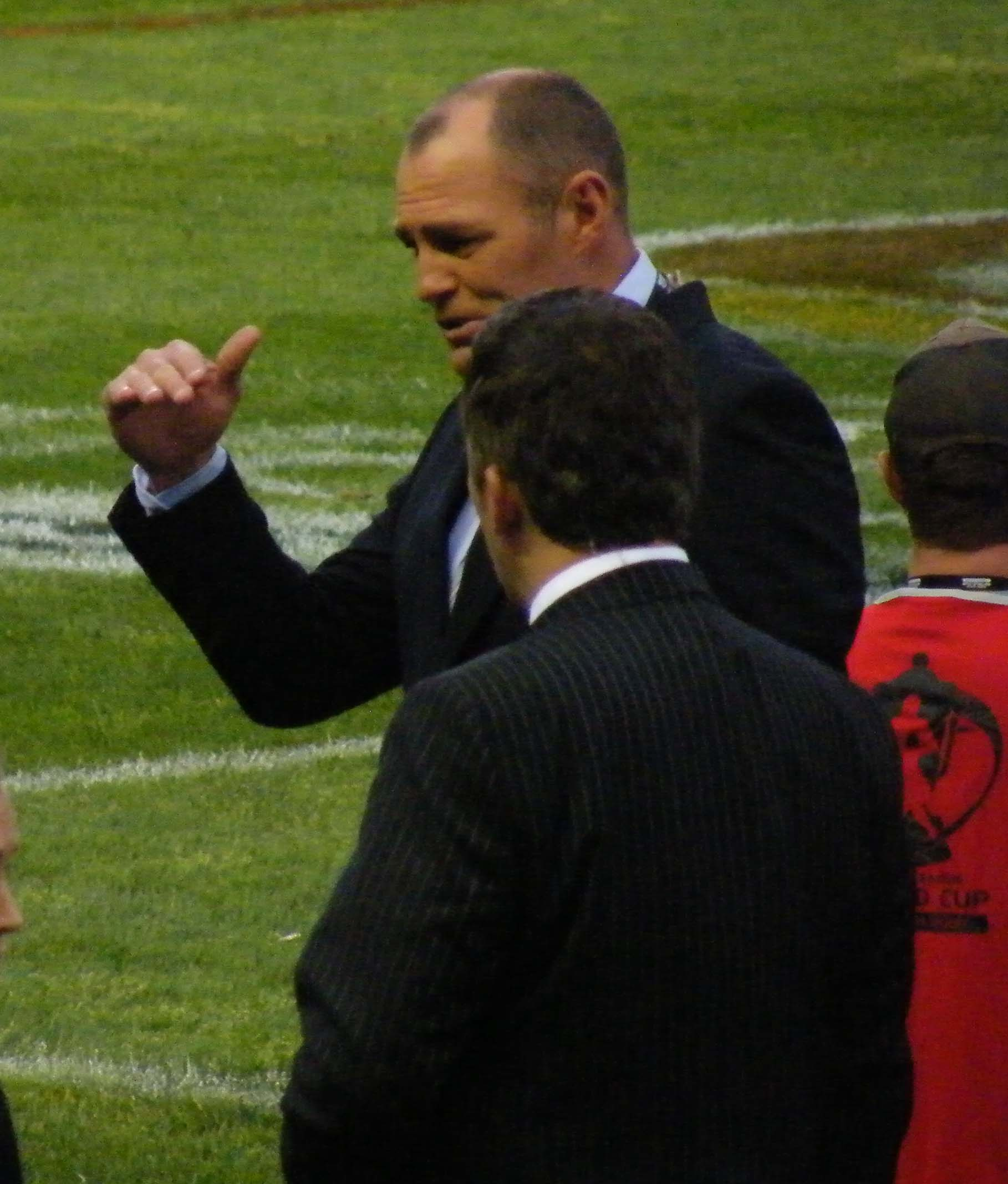

Personal information
- Full name: Daryl John Halligan
- Born: 25 July 1966 (age 60) Waikato, New Zealand

Playing information
- Height: 192 cm (6 ft 4 in)
- Weight: 96 kg (15 st 2 lb)

Rugby union
- Position: Fullback
Club
Years	Team	Pld	T	G	FG	P
1986–90	Waikato	56	32	97		360

Rugby league
- Position: Wing
Club
Years	Team	Pld	T	G	FG	P
1991–93	North Sydney	64	23	225	2	544
1994–00	Canterbury Bulldogs	166	57	630	2	1490
	Total	230	80	855	4	2034
Representative
Years	Team	Pld	T	G	FG	P
1992–98	New Zealand	20	4	60	1	137

Daryl John Halligan (born 25 July 1966) is a rugby league commentator and former professional rugby player. A New Zealand international winger, he was the preeminent goal-kicker of his era, retiring as the highest point scorer in Australian premiership history. Halligan played club football in Australia for the North Sydney Bears and Canterbury-Bankstown Bulldogs, winning the 1995 ARL Premiership with the latter.

== Rugby union ==
Halligan attended Hamilton Boys' High School and made the New Zealand national schoolboy rugby union team in 1984.

He played representative rugby union for Waikato.

== Rugby league career ==
Halligan made his first-grade rugby league debut for North Sydney against the Canberra Raiders in Round 1, 1991, at North Sydney Oval.

Halligan made 25 appearances for Norths as they enjoyed one of their best-ever seasons, finishing third on the table. In the minor preliminary semifinal, Halligan kicked six goals as Norths defeated arch rivals Manly 28–16. The following week, Norths' opponents were minor premiers, the Penrith Panthers, with the winner qualifying for the grand final. Penrith led Norths 12–0 at halftime before Norths fought back with Halligan scoring a try. Unfortunately for Norths, Halligan had one of his worst performances in his career as a goal kicker as he only kicked one goal from five attempts. Norths would lose the match 16-14 despite scoring more tries than Penrith and fell short of their first grand final appearance since 1943. The following week in the preliminary final, Norths were defeated 30–14.

Halligan spent two further seasons at Norths, but they failed to reach the finals. Halligan then joined Canterbury in 1994, and in his first season there played in the club's grand final loss against Canberra. In 1995, Halligan became a premiership-winning player as Canterbury defeated Manly 17–4 in the 1995 ARL grand final. Canterbury had defied the odds as they came from sixth place on the table to defeat minor premiers Manly in the decider, who had lost only two games all season.

In 1998, he played on the wing for Canterbury in their loss in the 1998 NRL grand final to the Brisbane Broncos. In the preliminary final a week before, Canterbury were losing to arch-rivals the Parramatta Eels 18–2 with less than 10 minutes to play until Canterbury staged one of the biggest comebacks in finals history, scoring three tries in nine minutes and Halligan kicking two goals from the sideline, one of which would take the game into extra time, which Canterbury would go on to win 32–20 at the Sydney Football Stadium.

Halligan retired at the conclusion of the 2000 season, with his final game being in round 26, 2000, against the Newcastle Knights, where he kicked four goals from four attempts.

== Playing style ==
Halligan is considered a good goalkicker, scoring 855 first-grade goals with 80% accuracy. Halligan is noted for revolutionising goal-kicking by using a plastic tee from which to kick, instead of the old method where kickers would set the ball upon a mound of sand or earth. He has since worked to design the widely used "Supertee" line of kicking tees.

== Records ==
In 2000, Halligan became the first person to score 2,000 points in the NRL. That same year he overtook Mick Cronin's record for the most points scored in an NSWRFL career (1,971)—a record that had stood since 1986; Halligan's eventual total of 2,034 was bettered by Jason Taylor in 2001. Halligan also scored 80 tries and kicked 4 field goals to amass that total.

== Post playing ==
Halligan is currently a commentator with Sky Network Television in New Zealand.

Preceded by Mick Cronin (1985)	Record-holder; Most points in an NRL career 2000 (1,972) - 2001 (2,034)	Succeeded by Jason Taylor (2001)
