= 1995 New Zealand rugby league season =

Seasons
- 1994 1996

The 1995 New Zealand rugby league season was the 88th season of rugby league that had been played in New Zealand. The main feature of the year was the second season of the Lion Red Cup competition that was run by the New Zealand Rugby League. The North Harbour Sea Eagles won the Cup by defeating the Auckland Warriors Colts 28–21 in the Grand Final.

== International competitions ==
The New Zealand national rugby league team played a two test series against France with tests being played at Ericsson Stadium in Auckland and FMG Stadium in Palmerston North. New Zealand won the first match 22-6 before drawing the second 16-all. The Kiwis then played a three match series in Australia, losing all three matches; 8-26, 10-20 and 10-46 respectively. New Zealand was coached by Frank Endacott and included; Richard Blackmore, Logan Edwards, Syd Eru, Gary Freeman, Daryl Halligan, Sean Hoppe, Tony Iro, Stephen Kearney, John Lomax, Jason Lowrie, Jarrod McCracken, Gene Ngamu, Henry Paul, Quentin Pongia, Matthew Ridge, Brent Stuart, Tony Tatupu, John Timu, Tony Tuimavave, Brendon Tuuta, Ruben Wiki and Jason Williams.

New Zealand then headed to England for the World Cup. They finished first in their pool, defeating Tonga and Papua New Guinea, before losing a Semifinal against Australia 30-20 after extra time. Coached by Frank Endacott, the World Cup squad included; Richie Barnett, Richie Blackmore, Syd Eru, Gary Freeman, Daryl Halligan, Sean Hoppe, Mark Horo, Kevin Iro, Tony Iro, Stacey Jones, Stephen Kearney, Tony Kemp, John Lomax, Jason Lowrie, Gene Ngamu, Hitro Okesene, Henry Paul, Quentin Pongia, captainMatthew Ridge, Brent Stuart, John Timu, Brendon Tuuta, Ruben Wiki and Jason Williams.

Before leaving for the World Cup the squad played the New Zealand Residents XIII at Ericsson Stadium and defeated them 20–4.

The Lion Red Cup XIII played twice, against the Kiwis and against Tongan Residents side. The squad against Tonga was: Glen Coughlan, Walter Wilson, Aaron Whittaker, Richard Broughton, Blair Harding, Brett Rodger, Anthony Swann, Nigel Vagana, Willie Swann, Aaron Lester, Julian O'Neill, Logan Swann, Paul Johnson, Darryn Avery, Jason Palmada, Matthew Sturm and Mark Faumuina. Gary Kemble was the coach.

For the game against New Zealand Gerard Stokes took over as coach after Kemble was appointed as one of the Kiwis assistant coaches. Newcomers to the Residents squad for the match included Willie McLean, Dean Clark, Phil Bergman, Patrick Kiely, Aaron Tucker, Heston Patea and Mark Woods.

The New Zealand Sevens team competed in the World Sevens. The squad was: Vinnie Weir (c), Peter Edwards, Solomon Kiri, Mike Doreen, Aaron Lester, Gus Malietoa-Brown, Martin Moana, Willie Swann, Hitro Okesene and Tecofe Kaufa. Despite the Auckland Warriors having first pick of players, New Zealand defeated the Warriors 26-10 during pool play.

The New Zealand Māori side made a three match internal tour in May–June, winning all three which included a 12–0 defeat of Auckland and a 20–8 defeat of Waikato. The squad was coached by Cameron Bell and included Darryl Beazley, Dean Clark, Blair Harding, Bryan Henare, Matthew Sturm, Frank Watene and Mark Woods.

The Junior Kangaroos toured New Zealand playing, and defeating, New Zealand Secondary Schools and the Junior Kiwis. The Junior Kiwis were coached by Stan Martin and included David Kidwell, Willie Talau and Steve Buckingham.

The New Zealand under 18's Academy Team was coached by Lex Clarke and included Frank Watene, Monty Betham and Odell Manuel. They won the first test 52-10 and the second match 44–0 against the touring British Amateur Rugby League Association youth side.

The under 17 team featured Monty Betham and Artie Shead while the Secondary Schools team featured Phillip Leuluai, Lesley Vainikolo and David Solomona. Henry Perenara and Wairangi Koopu both featured in the Under 15 national tournament with Koopu being named the player of the tournament.

The New Zealand Women's Rugby League Federation was registered in February 1995 and the first tour of Australia commenced in June. The Team played seven matches, winning all of them including defeating Australia 18-14 and 14–6.

Matthew Ridge was the New Zealand Rugby League player of the year.

== National competitions ==
=== Rugby League Cup ===
Canterbury defeated the West Coast 28–14 in their first defence of the season.

Auckland then won the Rugby League Cup, defeating Canterbury 21–18. This was Canterbury's first loss at home since 1989. Auckland were coached by Dominic Clark and included Leroy Joe, Mark Faumuina, Matthew Sturm and Jerry Seuseu. Canterbury included David Kidwell, Blair Harding and Glen Coughlan.

=== Lion Red Cup ===
==== The Teams ====
- The North Harbour Sea Eagles successfully defended their title despite losing 21 players from the 1994 season. Again coached by Graeme Norton, North Harbour also defeated the touring French side 40–10 in a mid-week match. The squad included Latham Tawhai, captain Don Stewart, Jason Palmada, Mike Setefano and Paki Tuimavave.
- The Waitakere City Raiders again finished last of the four Auckland based sides in the competition. However they were competitive for most of the season before losing their last five games and missing the playoffs. They were again coached by Ron O'Regan and the squad included Ben Lythe, Willie McLean, Cliff Beverley, Brian Jellick and Fred Robards.
- The Auckland Warriors Colts replaced the Auckland City Vulcans in the 1995 competition. This led to a reshuffle of the other Auckland franchises boundaries. The Warrior Colts used the facilities of the professional team at Ericsson Stadium. Coached by John Ackland the Colts won the minor premiership before slipping up in the Grand Final. Colts players included Phil Bergman, Steve Buckingham, David Fatialofa, Bryan Henare, Solomon Kiri, Aaron Lester, Des Maea, Brady Malam, Doc Murray, Boycie Nelson, Meti Noovao, Julian O'Neill, Paul Rauhihi, Paul Staladi, Anthony Swann, Logan Swann, Willie Swann, Nigel Vagana and Frank Watene.
- The Counties Manukau Heroes were coached by Stan Martin. They again finished in the top three, despite having only six players return from the 1994 squad. Players included Dean Clark, Mark Faumuina, Leroy Joe, Esau Mann, Matthew Sturm, Vinnie Weir and Jerry Seuseu.
- The Waikato Cougars were again coached by Joe Gwynne and again finished fourth. The team also played France, losing 2-24. The squad included Tukere Barlow, Darryl Beazley, Tama Hohaia, Butch Tua, captain Aaron Tucker, Tony Waikato and former Kiwi Mark Woods.
- The Bay of Plenty Stags again finished bottom of the table. Coach Neil Joyce resigned halfway through the season and he was replaced by former Kiwi coach Tony Gordon and Lawrence Brydon.
- The Taranaki Rockets concentrated on local talent, a tactic which did not play off as the team finished a disappointing 11th. Coach Allan Marshall retired at the end of the season. The squad included Blair Nickson and Willie Talau.
- the Hawkes Bay Unicorns were coached by Gary Kemble, who also coached the New Zealand Residents and was a New Zealand Kiwis assistant coach. The squad included Richard Broughton, Nathan Picchi and captain Alan Mason.
- The Hutt Valley Hawks were coached by Tyrone Paikea, Kara Puketapu and Mike Edmonds throughout the season. The team included Zane Clark, Denvour Johnston, Arnold Lomax and Yogi Rogers.
- The Wellington City Dukes were coached by Ken Laban and based largely around his 1994 champion Marist Northern club side. The team included Earl Va'a, who won the Best and Fairest award, and captain George Fa'alogo.
- The Christchurch City Shiners were coached by Lex Clarke and included former Kiwi Blair Harding, Shane Endacott and Paul Bergman. The team was greatly improved from the 1994 season and only just missed out on the finals.
- The Canterbury Country Cardinals were again coached by Ged Stokes but could not repeat their 1994 result of finishing third after injuries and player transfers altered the squad. The squad included Glen Coughlan, Marty Crequer, Paul Johnson, David Kidwell and Aaron Whittaker.

==== Season standings ====
Team	Pld	W	D	L	PF	PA	PD	Pts
Auckland Colts	22	18	0	4	675	356	319	36
Counties Manukau	22	14	1	7	573	413	160	29
North Harbour	22	13	1	8	601	379	222	27
Waikato	22	13	1	8	471	379	92	27
Hutt Valley	22	13	0	9	544	443	101	26
Christchurch City	22	12	1	9	455	419	36	25
Wellington City	22	10	2	10	440	514	-74	22
Waitakere City	22	10	1	11	430	386	44	21
Hawkes Bay	22	10	1	11	467	486	-19	21
Canterbury	22	9	2	11	446	448	-2	20
Taranaki	22	2	1	19	339	770	-431	5
Bay of Plenty	22	2	1	19	304	752	-448	5

==== The Playoffs ====
Qualifying and elimination finals
2	Counties Manukau	30
3	North Harbour	16
4	Waikato	28
5	Hutt Valley	14

Semi-finals
1	Auckland Colts	15
Counties Manukau	14
North Harbour	32
Waikato	16

Preliminary final
Counties Manukau	19
North Harbour	28

Grand final
Auckland Colts	21
North Harbour	28

Match	Winner		Loser
Elimination Play-off	Waikato Cougars	28	Hutt Valley Unicorns	14
Preliminary Semifinal	Counties Manukau Heroes	30	North Harbour Sea Eagles	16
Elimination Semifinal	North Harbour Sea Eagles	32	Waikato Cougars	16
Qualification Semifinal	Auckland Warriors Colts	15	Counties Manukau Heroes	14
Preliminary Final	North Harbour Sea Eagles	28	Counties Manukau Heroes	19

===== Grand Final =====
North Harbour	Position	Auckland Colts
Quinten Dane	FB	Nigel Vagana
Auvae Tapuai	WG	Paul Staladi
Paki Tuimavave	CE	Stuart Lester
Jason Kaulima	CE	Anthony Swann
Steve Barry	WG	Tacofe Kalauta
Aleki Maea	FE	Meti Noovao (C)
Latham Tawhai	HB	Willie Swann
Donald Stewart (C)	PR	Dallas Mead
Sean Wilson	HK	Aaron Lester
Darren Kohlhase	PR	David Fatialofa
Mike Setefano	SR	Bryan Henare
Keniti Asiata	SR	Frank Watene
Jason Palmada	LK	Logan Swann
Frank Fuimaono	Bench	Charlie Kennedy
Cory Jamieson	Bench	Des Maea
Lafaelle Filipo	Bench	Druce Nilsen
Brent Snooks	Bench	Steve Buckingham
Graeme Norton	Coach	John Ackland

After trailing 15–2 at halftime the North Harbour Sea Eagles came from behind to defeat the Warrior Colts 28–21 in the second Lion Red Cup Grand Final. The match included an eight-point try scored by Paki Tuimavave in the 48th minute. Tuimavave was tackled high by Aaron Lester while he was grounding the ball. Lester was then sin-binned for back chatting the referee after the incident.

Team	Halftime	Total
North Harbour Sea Eagles	2	28
Auckland Warriors Colts	15	21

Tries (North Harbour)	1: F. Fuimaono, S. Wilson, P. Tuimavave, J. Palmada
Tries (Auckland Colts)	1: N.Vagana, B.Henare, M.Noovao, W.Swann
Goals (North Harbour)	6: Q.Dane
Goals (Auckland Colts)	1: S.Buckingham, M.Noovao
Field Goals Goals (Auckland Colts)	1: M.Noovao
Date	16 September
Referee	Dennis Hale
Venue	Ericsson Stadium
Broadcast	TVNZ

==== Awards ====
- Best and Fairest: Earl Va'a (Wellington City)
- Coach of the Year: Graeme Norton (North Harbour)
- Captain of the Year: Don Stewart (North Harbour)
- Referee of the Year: Dennis Hale

Top Try Scorers

- 23 Shane Edwards (Counties-Manukau)
- 19 Anthony Swann (Warriors)
- 18 Richard Broughton (Hawkes Bay)
- 16 Don Stewart (North Harbour)
- 15 Heston Patea (Hutt Valley)
- 14 Aaron Tucker (Waikato)
- 14 Paul Staladi (Warriors)
- 13 Steve Ekepati (Counties-Manukau)
- 13 Paki Tuimavave (North Harbour)
- 13 Darryl Rolleston (Wellington City)
- 13 Steve Barry (North Harbour)

Top Point Scorers

- 182 Glen Coughlan (Canterbury Country)
- 164 Blair Nickson (Taranaki)
- 160 Greg Bright (Waikato)
- 150 Earl Va'a (Wellington City)
- 136 Paul Howell (Hutt Valley)
- 112 Latham Tawhai (North Harbour)
- 96 Meti Noovao (Warriors)
- 96 Te Manawa Loza (Counties-Manukau)
- 92 Jamie Stevens (Hawkes Bay)
- 92 Shane Edwards (Counties-Manukau)
- 76 Anthony Swann (Warriors)

=== National Provincial Championship ===
The NPC was conducted on an invitational basis, with all districts being invited to participate. Because Wellington and Canterbury also had teams in the Lion Red Cup, these sides were selected from only playing in their local club competitions.

==== Northern Division ====
This was the first time Coastline had competed as an independent district and they recorded their first ever win when they defeated Gisborne-East Coast 41–32. Gisborne-East Coast also defeated Northland for the first time ever.

Team	Pld	W	D	L	PF	PA	Pts
Wellington	4	4	0	0	154	82	8
Northland	4	2	0	2	145	105	4
Manawatu	4	2	0	2	98	99	4
Gisborne-East Coast	4	1	0	3	115	157	2
Coastline	4	1	0	3	99	168	2

==== Southern Division ====
This was the first time Nelson-Marlborough had competed as an independent district. Otago recorded their first win over Canterbury in 35 years.

Team	Pld	W	D	L	PF	PA	Pts
West Coast	3	3	0	0	112	40	6
Otago	3	2	0	1	44	46	4
Canterbury	3	1	0	2	86	44	2
Nelson-Marlborough	3	0	0	3	10	122	0

==== Finals ====
The Grand Final was played in Christchurch with Wellington winning 32-20 after being down 10–14 at halftime.

Semifinals
Wellington	30
Northland	4
West Coast	30
Otago	16

Finals
Wellington	32
West Coast	20

=== National Secondary Schools Tournament ===
Eighty Two schools competed in the National tournament with St. Paul's College, De La Salle College, New Plymouth Boys High School and Hillmorton High School all making the semi-finals. St Paul's won the trophy for the second year in a row, defeating New Plymouth 38–6 in the final.

== Australian competitions ==
The Auckland Warriors competed in the Australian Rugby League competition for the first time. The team finished tenth, missing the finals by only two points. The Reserve Grade team made the finals but lost in the quarterfinals.

== Club competitions ==
=== Auckland ===
The Otahuhu Leopards won the Fox Memorial, their tenth, by defeating the Marist Saints 32–0 in the grand final. City Pt Chevalier won the Rukutai Shield as minor premiers.

The Manurewa Marlins defeated the Waitemata Seagulls to win the Sharman Cup second division. As a result, they were promoted to the Fox Memorial for 1996. Otahuhu won the Stormont Shield.

Otahuhu were coached by Trevor McLeod while Marist were coached by Del Hughes. Richmond included Greg Wolfgram, Ben Lythe and Boycie Nelson played for Mt Albert and Steve Buckingham and Lee Tamatoa played for Glenora.

=== Wellington ===
Marist Northern won the grand final of the Wellington Rugby League competition, defeating St George 48–22. The Randwick Kingfishers were the minor premiers.

=== Canterbury ===
The Halswell Hornets won the Canterbury Rugby League's Pat Smith Challenge Trophy grand final 20–19 over Linwood. Halswell were coached by Phil Prescott and included Glen Coughlan. The two teams had earlier shared the minor premiership.

The West Coast Waro-rakau Hornets won the Thacker Shield by defeating Canterbury's Haswell Hornets 48–16.

=== Northland ===
The Moerewa Tigers won the Bay of Islands competition, by defeating the Kaikohe Lions 16–12.

The West End Jumbos won the Whangarei City & Districts title, by defeating the Otaika Eagles 30–24 at Jubilee Park, Whangārei.

The East Coast Rebels won the Far North Districts title by defeating the Te Paatu United Warriors 32–28.

=== Other Competitions ===
Turangawaewae won the minor premiership and the championship in the Waikato Rugby League competition, defeating Taniwharau Rugby League 20–15 in the grand final.

The Piako Warriors defeated the Tokoroa Pacific Sharks 34–20 in the Bay of Plenty Rugby League grand final. Piako featured Hare Te Rangi.

The Waitara Bears won the Taranaki Rugby League competition 16–14 over the defending champions, the Western Suburbs Tigers. The Bears featured Blair Nickson while the Tigers included Willie Talau. Kia Ora, coached by Peter Sixtus, defeated Otaki 14–4 in the Manawatu Rugby League grand final.

Taradale Eagles defeated the Omahu Huia 51–10 in the Hawke's Bay Rugby League grand final while the Kaiti Knights won the Gisborne-East Coast grand final, defeating Uawa 34–26.

The Motueka Tigers won the Nelson-Marlborough grand final, defeating the Blenheim Knights 42–24. Cobden-Kohinoor won the West Coast Rugby League grand final, defeating minor premiers Waro-rakau 12–10. The Waitati Warriors won the Otago grand final 14–10 over the South Pacific Raiders while Bluff defeated He Tauaa 20–14 in the Southland championship match.
