= 1995 Auckland Warriors season =

Rugby league team season

- ARL rank: 10th
- 1995 record: Wins: 13; draws: 0; losses: 9
- Points scored: For: 538; against: 501

Team information
- CEO: Ian Robson
- Coach: John Monie
- Captains: Dean Bell; Stephen Kearney Duane Mann
- Stadium: Ericsson Stadium
- Avg. attendance: 26,450

Top scorers
- Tries: Sean Hoppe (19)
- Goals: Gene Ngamu (36)
- Points: Gene Ngamu (84)
1996 →

The 1995 Auckland Warriors season was the inaugural season of the newly-formed club. Competing the 1995 Australian Rugby League premiership, they were coached by John Monie and captained by Dean Bell. The Warriors' home ground for their first season was Ericsson Stadium. They finished their first premiership regular season 10th (out of 20), so failed to make the finals.

== Milestones ==
- 10 March - Round One: The Warriors play their inaugural game against the Brisbane Broncos. A crowd of 29,220 watch the Warriors go down 25-22 to the Broncos, after leading them throughout the game.
- 16 March - Round Three: The Warriors are docked two competition points for using an extra interchange player in a win over the Western Suburbs Magpies. They would ultimately miss out on the finals by two points. The fifth interchange player was sent on as a blood bin replacement, with the coaching staff not realising this was against the rules.
- A total of 110,252 attended the first four matches at Ericsson Stadium, an average of 27,563.
- 23 April - Round Seven: Stacey Jones makes his debut for the Warriors, scoring six points in a win over Parramatta.
- 4 June - Round Eleven: The final two members of the squad, Frano Botica and Denis Betts, make their debuts for the Warriors after completing the English season for Wigan.
- October: 18 players from the club participated in the World Cup: Denis Betts, Andy Platt (England), Richie Blackmore, Syd Eru, Sean Hoppe, Stacey Jones, Stephen Kearney, Gene Ngamu, Hitro Okesene (New Zealand), Duane Mann (Tonga), Willie Poching, Tea Ropati, Se'e Solomona, Willie Swann, Tony Tatupu, Tony Tuimavave, Joe Vagana and Nigel Vagana (Western Samoa). In addition, Frank Endacott coached New Zealand.

== Jersey and sponsors ==

The Warriors inaugural jersey was produced by Canterbury of New Zealand. The Jersey was blue with a Green, Red and White "V". In part, the colours were based on the traditional Auckland colours of Blue and White. The main sponsor was DB Bitter, with Ansett Australia as the sleeve sponsor. Asics, Coca-Cola and Mitsubishi also had sponsorship deals.

== Fixtures ==
The Warriors used Ericsson Stadium as their home ground in 1995, and it remained the only Home Ground the club used in the competition until they played a match at Eden Park in 2011.

=== Pre-season ===
Three pre-season matches were played before the World Sevens and another three were played after the World Sevens.

Date	Round	Opponent	Venue	Result	Score	Tries	Goals	Attendance	Report
18 January	Match 1	Canterbury	Addington Showgrounds, Christchurch	Win	26 - 12			12,811	
January	Match 2	Central Districts	Palmerston North Showgrounds, Palmerston North	Win	36 - 16				
January	Match 3	Auckland	Carlaw Park, Auckland	Win	46 - 20				
February	Match 4	Northland	Kaikohe	Win	66 - 6				
14 February	Match 5	Canberra Raiders	Carlaw Park, Auckland	Win	23 - 16			16,000	
25 February	Match 6	Western Reds	West Wyong	Loss	28 - 40				

=== World Sevens ===
The Warriors participated in the 1995 Rugby League World Sevens, losing in the Trophy Quarterfinals.

Squad: Phil Blake (c), Sean Hoppe, Manoa Thompson, Tea Ropati, Whetu Taewa, Gene Ngamu, Syd Eru, Stephen Kearney, Tony Tatupu, Des Maea.

Date	Round	Opponent	Venue	Result	Score	Tries	Goals	Attendance	Report
3 February	Round 1	Canberra Raiders	Suncorp Stadium, Brisbane	Win	22 - 4	Blake (2), Hoppe, Ngamu	Ngamu (3)		
3 February	Round 2	New Zealand 'A'	Suncorp Stadium, Brisbane	Loss	10 - 26	Eru, Ropati	Ngamu (1)		
5 February	Trophy; Quarterfinals	Sydney Tigers	Sydney Football Stadium, Sydney	Loss	12 - 16	Ngamu (2)	Ngamu (2)		

=== Tooheys Challenge Cup ===
Team: Phil Blake (c), Sean Hoppe, Dean Bell, Manoa Thompson, Whetu Taewa, Martin Moana, Gene Ngamu, Gavin Hill, Duane Mann, Hitro Okesene, Stephen Kearney, Tony Tatupu, Tony Tuimavave. Bench: Tea Ropati, Se'e Solomona, Mike Dorreen, Jason Mackie.

Date	Round	Opponent	Venue	Result	Score	Tries	Goals	Attendance	Report
19 February	Round 1	North Sydney Bears	Parramatta Stadium, Sydney	Loss	14 - 12	Taewa, Ngamu	Hill (1), Ngamu (1)	8211	

=== Regular season ===
Date	Round	Opponent	Venue	Result	Score	Tries	Goals	Attendance	Report
10 March	Round 1	Brisbane Broncos	Ericsson Stadium, Auckland	Loss	22 - 25	Blake, Hoppe, Ropati, Tatupu	Ngamu (3)	29,220	
18 March	Round 2	Illawarra Steelers	Steelers Stadium, Wollongong	Loss	28 - 40	Blake (2), Hoppe (2), Ropati	Ngamu (4)	12,127	
26 March	Round 3	Western Suburbs Magpies	Ericsson Stadium, Auckland	Win*	46 - 12	Blake (4), Alexander, Kearney, Ngamu, Ropati	Ngamu (7)	21,446	
1 April	Round 4	North Sydney Bears	North Sydney Oval, Sydney	Loss	10 - 48	Blake (2)	Ngamu (1)	14,683	
7 April	Round 5	Manly-Warringah Sea Eagles	Ericsson Stadium, Auckland	Loss	14 - 26	Hoppe (2), Moana	Ngamu (1)	30,112	
16 April	Round 6	Illawarra Steelers	Ericsson Stadium, Auckland	Win	38 - 12	Hoppe (2), Ropati, Alexander, Bell, Mann, Taewa	Ngamu (5)	29,474	
23 April	Round 7	Parramatta Eels	Parramatta Stadium, Sydney	Win	40 - 4	Blake, Hoppe, Jones, Mann, Ngamu, Ropati, Tatupu	Ngamu (4), Alexander (1), Jones (1)	10,426	
30 April	Round 8	Sydney City Roosters	Ericsson Stadium, Auckland	Win	26 - 22	Bell (2), Mann, Ropati, Tatupu	Ngamu (3)	29,048	
7 May	Round 9	Newcastle Knights	Marathon Stadium, Newcastle	Loss	6 - 48	Blake, Hoppe, Ropati, Tatupu	Ngamu (3)	29,220	
14 May	Round 10	Cronulla Sharks	Caltex Field, Sydney	Win	23 - 18	Hoppe, Dorreen, Kirwan, Okesene	Ngamu (1), Jones (FG)	10,142	
4 June	Round 11	Sydney Tigers	Ericsson Stadium, Auckland	Win	36 - 12	Hoppe (2), Betts (2) Jones, Ropati	Botica (6)	28,713	
18 June	Round 12	Penrith Panthers	Ericsson Stadium, Auckland	Loss	16 - 34	Blackmore (2), Okesene, Ropati		24,723	
25 June	Round 13	Western Suburbs Magpies	Campbelltown SG, Sydney	Win	16 - 12	Jones, Tuimavave, Tatupu	Jones (2)	10,700	
1 July	Round 14	South Sydney Rabbitohs	SFS, Sydney	Win	38 - 20	Eru (2), Alexander, Betts, Botica, Edwards, Tatupu	Botica (5)	6,954	
9 July	Round 15	Gold Coast Seagulls	Ericsson Stadium, Auckland	Win	44 - 16	Ropati (3), Alexander, Botica, Dorreen, Hoppe, Kirwan	Botica (6)	20,493	
16 July	Round 16	Western Reds	Ericsson Stadium, Auckland	Win	34 - 10	Alexander, Betts, Eru, Hoppe, Jones, Ropati	Jones (3), Botica (2)	19,244	
23 July	Round 17	South Queensland Crushers	Suncorp Stadium, Brisbane	Win	22 - 10	Hoppe (2), Blake, Blackmore	Jones (3)	28,928	
29 July	Round 18	North Queensland Cowboys	Stockland Stadium, Townsville	Win	28 - 10	Alexander (2), Betts, Blackmore, Hoppe, Kirwan	Ngamu (2)	23,521	
6 August	Round 19	St George Dragons	Ericsson Stadium, Auckland	Loss	14 - 47	Blackmore, Hoppe, Jones	Alexander (1)	28,973	
11 August	Round 20	Sydney Bulldogs	Parramatta Stadium, Sydney	Win	29 - 8	Blake (2), Alexander, Kearney, Poaching	Alexander (2), Hill (1), Ngamu (1), Jones (FG)	10,416	
18 August	Round 21	Canberra Raiders	Ericsson Stadium, Auckland	Loss	8 - 15	Hoppe	Ngamu (2)	29,500	
27 August	Round 22	Brisbane Broncos	ANZ Stadium, Brisbane	Loss	6 - 44	Ngamu	Ngamu (1)	54,645	

*The Warriors were stripped the 2 competition points from winning this game due to exceeding the replacement limit.

== Ladder ==
	Team	Pld	W	D	L	PF	PA	PD	Pts
1	Manly	22	20	0	2	687	248	+439	40
2	Canberra	22	20	0	2	634	255	+379	40
3	Brisbane	22	17	0	5	600	364	+236	34
4	Cronulla	22	16	0	6	516	287	+229	32
5	Newcastle	22	15	0	7	549	396	+153	30
6	Sydney Bulldogs	22	14	0	8	468	352	+116	28
7	St. George	22	13	0	9	583	382	+201	26
8	North Sydney	22	11	2	9	542	331	+211	24
9	Sydney City	22	12	0	10	466	406	+60	24
10	Auckland	22	13	0	9	544	493	+51	24*
11	Western Reds	22	11	0	11	361	549	-188	22
12	Illawarra	22	10	1	11	519	431	+88	21
13	Western Suburbs	22	10	0	12	459	534	-75	20
14	Penrith	22	9	0	13	481	484	-3	18
15	Sydney Tigers	22	7	0	15	309	591	-282	14
16	South Queensland	22	6	1	15	303	502	-199	13
17	Gold Coast	22	4	1	17	350	628	-278	9
18	South Sydney	22	4	1	17	319	686	-367	9
19	Parramatta	22	3	0	19	310	690	-380	6
20	North Queensland	22	2	0	20	269	660	-391	4

*Auckland Warriors were stripped of 2 competition points due to exceeding the replacement limit in one game.

== Squad ==
Twenty Eight players were used by the club in 1995.

No.	Name	Nationality	Position	Warriors debut	App	T	G	FG	Pts
1	Dean Bell	(New Zealand)	CE / LK	10 March	19	3	0	0	12
2	Phil Blake	(Australia)	FB / HK	10 March	17	14	0	0	56
3	Sean Hoppe	(New Zealand)	WG	10 March	22	19	0	0	76
4	Manoa Thompson	(Fiji)	CE	10 March	7	0	0	0	0
5	Whetu Taewa	(New Zealand)	CE	10 March	11	1	0	0	4
6	Gene Ngamu	(New Zealand)	FE	10 March	21	3	36	0	84
7	Greg Alexander	(Australia)	FB / HB	10 March	21	8	4	0	40
8	Gavin Hill	(New Zealand)	PR	10 March	7	0	1	0	2
9	Duane Mann	(New Zealand) / (Tonga)	HK	10 March	13	3	0	0	12
10	Hitro Okesene	(New Zealand)	PR / HK	10 March	17	2	0	0	8
11	Stephen Kearney	(New Zealand)	SR	10 March	20	2	0	0	8
12	Tony Tatupu	(New Zealand) / (Samoa)	SR	10 March	16	5	0	0	20
13	Tony Tuimavave	(New Zealand) / (Samoa)	PR / LK	10 March	21	1	0	0	4
14	Se'e Solomona	(New Zealand) / (Samoa)	PR	10 March	9	0	0	0	0
15	Tea Ropati	(New Zealand) / (Samoa)	CE / FE	10 March	21	12	0	0	48
16	Jason Mackie	(New Zealand)	LK	10 March	5	0	0	0	0
17	Martin Moana	(New Zealand)	LK / FE	10 March	6	1	0	0	4
18	Joe Vagana	(New Zealand) / (Samoa)	PR	18 March	8	0	0	0	0
19	Syd Eru	(New Zealand)	HK	28 March	15	3	0	0	12
20	Willie Poching	(New Zealand) / (Samoa)	SR	28 March	2	1	0	0	4
21	Logan Edwards	(New Zealand)	SR / LK	7 April	15	1	0	0	4
22	John Kirwan	(New Zealand)	WG	16 April	16	3	0	0	12
23	Andy Platt	(England)	PR	23 April	14	0	0	0	0
24	Stacey Jones	(New Zealand)	HB	23 April	14	5	9	2	40
25	Mike Dorreen	(New Zealand)	CE	7 May	4	2	0	0	8
26	Richie Blackmore	(New Zealand)	CE	14 May	10	5	0	0	20
27	Frano Botica	(New Zealand)	WG	4 June	5	2	19	0	46
28	Denis Betts	(England)	SR	4 June	11	5	0	0	20

== Staff ==
- Chairman: Peter McLeod
- Chief executive Officer: Ian Robson
- Football manager: Laurie Stubbing

=== Coaching staff ===
- Head coach: John Monie
- Reserve grade coach: Frank Endacott
- Coaching & development manager: Bob Hall
- U16 grade coach & development officer: John Ackland
- U16 grade co-coach: Brian McClennan

== Other teams ==
The Warriors participated in the ARL's Reserve grade competition that mirrored the senior draw. The Reserve grade side made the top eight, finishing eighth, but lost to Penrith 8-14 in the Quarterfinals.

In the Club Championship the Warriors finished seventh overall.

=== Warriors Colts ===
In addition a Warriors Colts side was fielded in NZRL's Lion Red Cup. The Warrior Colts made the grand final but lost to the North Harbour Sea Eagles.

North Harbour	Position	Auckland Colts
Quinten Dane	FB	Nigel Vagana
Auvae Tapuai	WG	Paul Staladi
Paki Tuimavave	CE	Stuart Lester
Jason Kaulima	CE	Anthony Swann
Steve Barry	WG	Tacofe Kalauta
Aleki Maea	FE	Meti Noovao (C)
Latham Tawhai	HB	Willie Swann
Donald Stewart (C)	PR	Dallas Mead
Sean Wilson	HK	Aaron Lester
Darren Kohlhase	PR	David Fatialofa
Mike Setefano	SR	Bryan Henare
Keniti Asiata	SR	Frank Watene
Jason Palmada	LK	Logan Swann
Frank Fuimaono	Bench	Charlie Kennedy
Cory Jamieson	Bench	Des Maea
Lafaelle Filipo	Bench	Druce Nilsen
Brent Snooks	Bench	Steve Buckingham
Graeme Norton	Coach	John Ackland

After trailing 15–2 at halftime the North Harbour Sea Eagles came from behind to defeat the Warrior Colts 28–21 in the second Lion Red Cup Grand Final. The match included an eight-point try scored by Paki Tuimavave in the 48th minute. Tuimavave was tackled high by Aaron Lester while he was grounding the ball. Lester was then sin-binned for back chatting the referee after the incident.

Team	Halftime	Total
North Harbour Sea Eagles	2	28
Auckland Warriors Colts	15	21

Tries (North Harbour)	1: F. Fuimaono, S. Wilson, P. Tuimavave, J. Palmada
Tries (Auckland Colts)	1: N.Vagana, B.Henare, M.Noovao, W.Swann
Goals (North Harbour)	6: Q.Dane
Goals (Auckland Colts)	1: S.Buckingham, M.Noovao
Field Goals Goals (Auckland Colts)	1: M.Noovao
Date	16 September
Referee	Dennis Hale
Venue	Ericsson Stadium
Broadcast	TVNZ

== Awards ==
Tea Ropati won the club's Player of the Year award.

== Super League ==
The Auckland Warriors, along with seven other clubs, signed with News Limited to form a new competition in 1996, the Super League. Thirteen players signed with the new competition on 2 April 1995, after the Warriors' Round 4 loss to the North Sydney Bears, with coach John Monie having signed in late March. The club as a whole signed with News Limited on 20 April. This decision meant that Auckland Warriors players became ineligible for the New South Wales and Queensland State of Origin sides and the Australian Kangaroos. The New Zealand Rugby League and English Rugby Football League organisations had also signed with News Limited and so the majority of Warriors players were still eligible to represent their countries at the 1995 Rugby League World Cup.
