= 1997 Auckland Warriors season =

- SL rank: 7th
- 1997 record: Wins: 7; draws: 0; losses: 11
- Points scored: For: 332; against: 406

Team information
- CEO: Bill MacGowan
- Coach: John Monie; Frank Endacott
- Captain: Matthew Ridge
- Stadium: Ericsson Stadium
- Avg. attendance: 15,442

Top scorers
- Tries: Sean Hoppe (11)
- Goals: Marc Ellis (25)
- Points: Marc Ellis (71)
← 1996	1998 →

The Auckland Warriors 1997 season was the Auckland Warriors 3rd first-grade season. The club competed in Australasia's Super League. The coach of the team was John Monie until he was replaced by Frank Endacott after Round 9 while Matthew Ridge was the club's captain.

== Milestones ==
- 12 April – Round 7: Sean Hoppe plays his 50th match for the club.
- 19 April – Round 8: Gene Ngamu and Tea Ropati play in their 50th match for the club.
- 27 April – Round 9: Stephen Kearney plays his 50th match for the club.
- 6 July – Round 14: Stacey Jones plays his 50th match for the club.

== Jersey and sponsors ==

The Warriors adopted a new jersey in 1997 that matched the Super League style used by the other nine teams in the competition. The jerseys were made by Nike, Inc.

== Fixtures ==
The Warriors used Ericsson Stadium as their home ground in 1997, their only home ground since they entered the competition in 1995.

=== Regular season ===
Date	Round	Opponent	Venue	Result	Score	Tries	Goals	Attendance	Report
1 March	Round 1	Brisbane Broncos	ANZ Stadium, Brisbane	Loss	2–14		Ridge (1)	42,361	
8 March	Round 2	Hunter Mariners	Ericsson Stadium, Auckland	Win	18–14	Hoppe (2), Eru	Ridge (3)	20,300	
17 March	Round 3	Cronulla Sharks	Shark Park, Sydney	Loss	8–34	Betts	Ridge (2)	16,860	
21 March	Round 4	Adelaide Rams	Ericsson Stadium, Auckland	Loss	12–16	Jones, Tuimavave	Ellis (2)	13,000	
29 March	Round 5	Penrith Panthers	Ericsson Stadium, Auckland	Win	16–14	Betts, Hoppe, T.Ropati	Ellis (1), Ridge (1)	19,400	
7 April	Round 6	Canberra Raiders	Bruce Stadium, Canberra	Win	31–24	Henare, Hoppe, Jones, Kearnery, I.Ropati	Ellis (5 + FG)	15,061	
12 April	Round 7	Hunter Mariners	Topper Stadium, Newcastle	Loss	10–18	Hoppe, I.Ropati	Ellis (1)	7,719	
19 April	Round 8	Canterbury Bulldogs	Ericsson Stadium, Auckland	Loss	24–38	Eru, Jones, I.Ropati, T.Ropati	Ellis (4)	17,000	
27 April	Round 9	North Queensland Cowboys	Stockland Stadium, Townsville	Loss	22–30	Endacott, Hoppe, T.Ropati	Ellis (5)	12,464	
4 May	Round 10	Brisbane Broncos	Ericsson Stadium, Auckland	Loss	18–34	Hoppe (2), T.Ropati	Ellis (3)	16,471	
26 May	Round 11	Canberra Raiders	Ericsson Stadium, Auckland	Loss	10–20	Ellis, Ridge	Ellis (1)	15,100	
1 June	Round 12	Western Reds	WACA Ground, Perth	Loss	12–24	Eru, Hoppe	Ngamu (2)	10,203	
6 June	WCC 1	St Helens R.F.C.	Knowsley Road, St. Helens	Win	42–14	Hoppe (2), A.Swann (2), Jones, Kearney, T.Ropati	Ridge (7)	8,911	
14 June	WCC 2	Bradford Bulls	Odsal Stadium, Bradford	Win	20–16	Jones, Ridge, Staladi	Ridge (4)	13,133	
23 June	WCC 3	Warrington Wolves	Wilderspool Stadium, Warrington	Win	56–28	T.Ropati (4), A.Swann (2), Kearney, Ngamu, Ridge, Vagana	Ridge (8)	4,428	
29 June	Round 13	Penrith Panthers	Penrith Stadium, Sydney	Loss	22–26	Eru (2), Jones, Staladi	Ngamu (3)	4,446	
6 July	Round 14	Cronulla Sharks	Ericsson Stadium, Auckland	Win	11–8	Ellis	Ridge (3), Jones (FG)	12,568	
11 July	Round 15	Adelaide Rams	Adelaide Oval, Adelaide	Win	18–8	Oudenryn, T.Ropati	Ellis (3)	13,278	
18 July	WCC 4	Bradford Bulls	Ericsson Stadium, Auckland	Win	64–14	T.Ropati (3), Hoppe (2), Betts, Ellis, Eru, Ngamu, Oudenryn	Ngamu (12)	12,500	
25 July	WCC 5	St Helens R.F.C.	Ericsson Stadium, Auckland	Win	70–6	Ngamu (3), Eru (2), Hoppe (2), Oudenryn (2), Betts, Ellis, Jones	Ridge (11)	18,354	
3 August	WCC 6	Warrington Wolves	Lancaster Park, Christchurch	Win	16–4	Eru, Jones, Kearney	Ridge (2)	5,500	
11 August	Round 16	Canterbury Bulldogs	Belmore Sports Ground, Sydney	Loss	18–40	Hoppe, Oudenryn, A.Swann	Ridge (3)	5,126	
16 August	Round 17	Western Reds	Ericsson Stadium, Auckland	Win	30–22	Ridge (2), Betts, Jones, Kearney	Ridge (5)	13,142	
24 August	Round 18	North Queensland Cowboys	Ericsson Stadium, Auckland	Win	50–22	Ellis (3), Jones (2), Bailey, Hoppe, Oudenryn, A.Swann	Ngamu (7)	12,000	

=== World Club Challenge Finals ===
Date	Round	Opponent	Venue	Result	Score	Tries	Goals	Attendance	Report
3 October	Qualifying Final	Bradford Bulls	Ericsson Stadium, Auckland	Win	62–14	Hoppe (2), Ridge (2), Ellis, Eru, Jones, Malam, Ngamu, A.Swann, L.Swann	Ridge (9)	12,063	
10 October	Semi-final	Brisbane Broncos	ANZ Stadium, Brisbane	Loss	16–22	Oudenryn (2), Endacott	Ridge (2)	9,686	

== Ladder ==
Pos	Team	Pld	W	D	L	PF	PA	PD	Pts
1	Brisbane Broncos (P)	18	14	1	3	481	283	+198	29
2	Cronulla Sharks	18	12	0	6	403	230	+173	24
3	Canberra Raiders	18	11	0	7	436	337	+99	22
4	Canterbury Bulldogs	18	10	0	8	453	447	+6	20
5	Penrith Panthers	18	9	0	9	431	462	-31	18
6	Hunter Mariners	18	7	0	11	350	363	-13	14
7	Auckland Warriors	18	7	0	11	332	406	-74	14
8	Perth Reds	18	7	0	11	321	456	-135	14
9	Adelaide Rams	18	6	1	11	303	402	-99	13
10	North Queensland Cowboys	18	5	2	11	328	452	-124	12

- (P) - Premiers

=== WCC Australasia Pool A ===
Club	Played	Won	Lost	Drawn	For	Against	Diff.	Points
Brisbane Broncos	6	6	0	0	270	52	218	12
Auckland Warriors	6	6	0	0	268	82	186	12
Cronulla Sharks	6	6	0	0	230	54	176	12
Penrith Panthers	6	6	0	0	256	120	136	12
Canberra Raiders	6	5	1	0	302	108	194	10
Canterbury Bulldogs	6	4	2	0	218	121	97	8

== Squad ==
The Warriors used 29 players in 1997, including four players making their first grade debuts.

No.	Name	Nationality	Position	Warriors debut	App	T	G	FG	Pts
2	Phil Blake	(Australia)	FB / HK	10 March 1995	2	0	0	0	0
3	Sean Hoppe†	(New Zealand)	WG	10 March 1995	18	11	0	0	44
6	Gene Ngamu†	(New Zealand)	FE	10 March 1995	17	0	12	0	24
10	Hitro Okesene	(New Zealand)	PR / HK	10 March 1995	1	0	0	0	0
11	Stephen Kearney†	(New Zealand)	SR	10 March 1995	17	2	0	0	8
13	Tony Tuimavave†	(New Zealand) / (Samoa)	PR / LK	10 March 1995	7	1	0	0	4
15	Tea Ropati†	(New Zealand) / (Samoa)	CE / FE	10 March 1995	16	5	0	0	20
18	Joe Vagana†	(New Zealand) / (Samoa)	PR	18 March 1995	17	0	0	0	0
19	Syd Eru†	(New Zealand)	HK	28 March 1995	18	5	0	0	20
24	Stacey Jones†	(New Zealand)	HB	23 April 1995	18	7	0	1	29
28	Denis Betts†	(England)	SR	4 June 1995	14	3	0	0	12
29	Marc Ellis†	(New Zealand)	FB / WG	31 March 1996	16	5	25	1	71
30	Mark Horo†	(New Zealand)	PR / SR	31 March 1996	15	0	0	0	0
33	Awen Guttenbeil†	(New Zealand) / (Tonga)	SR	14 April 1996	4	0	0	0	0
35	Iva Ropati	(New Zealand)	CE	19 April 1996	5	3	0	0	12
36	Anthony Swann†	(New Zealand) / (Samoa)	CE	23 June 1996	18	2	0	0	8
37	Brady Malam†	(New Zealand)	PR	23 June 1996	15	0	0	0	0
38	Bryan Henare	(New Zealand)	SR	23 July 1996	11	1	0	0	4
40	Matthew Ridge†	(New Zealand)	FB	1 March 1997	9	3	18	0	48
41	Grant Young	(New Zealand)	PR	1 March 1997	9	0	0	0	0
42	Logan Swann†	(New Zealand)	SR	1 March 1997	13	0	0	0	0
43	Steve Buckingham	(New Zealand)	FE	17 March 1997	2	0	0	0	0
44	Shane Endacott†	(New Zealand)	FE	29 March 1997	8	1	0	0	4
45	Paul Staladi†	(New Zealand)	WG	27 April 1997	4	1	0	0	4
46	Meti Noovao	(Cook Islands)	CE / LK	1 June 1997	1	0	0	0	0
47	Lee Oudenryn†	(Australia)	WG	6 July 1997	5	4	0	0	16
48	Aaron Whittaker	(New Zealand)	HB	29 June 1997	1	0	0	0	0
49	David Bailey	(New Zealand)	CE	11 August 1997	3	1	0	0	4
50	Jerry Seu Seu	(New Zealand) / (Samoa)	PR	16 August 1997	1	0	0	0	0

- A cross (†) next to a name denotes that the player played in the 1997 World Club Championship.

== Staff ==
- Chief Executive Officer: Ian Robson, replaced by Bill MacGowan in February 1997

=== Coaching staff ===
- Head Coach: John Monie, replaced by Frank Endacott in late April 1997.
- Reserve Grade Coach: Frank Endacott, replaced by Gary Kemble.
- Under 19 Coach: John Ackland

== Transfers ==
=== Gains ===
Player	Previous club	Length	Notes
Matthew Ridge	Manly Sea Eagles		Had initially signed and trained with the side in 1996, until the Super League season was postponed.
Grant Young	South Queensland Crushers		
Shane Endacott	Canterbury Country Cardinals		
Lee Oudenryn	Gold Coast Seagulls		

=== Losses ===
Player	Club	Notes
Aaron Lester	Whitehaven	
Doc Murray	Wigan Warriors	
Nigel Vagana	Warrington Wolves	
Mark Carter	Auckland Rugby Football Union	
Andy Platt	Salford City Reds	
John Kirwan	NEC Green Rockets	
Tony Tatupu	Warrington Wolves	
Gavin Hill	Retired	
Greg Alexander	Penrith Panthers	
Richie Blackmore	Leeds Rhinos	

== Awards ==
Stacey Jones won the club's Player of the Year award.

== Other teams ==
The Warriors fielded teams in both Super League's reserve grade and the Under-19 competition (The Mal Meninga Cup). The Reserve Grade side finished fourth and then beat Cronulla, Perth and North Queensland to make the Grand Final while the Under 19's finished the regular season as minor premiers, beating Penrith to make the Grand Final. Ultimately however both sides lost their respective Grand Finals, with the reserve grade going down 12–40 and the Under-19's losing 12–27.

=== Grand Final Teams ===
Reserve Grade: Glen Coughlan, Iva Ropati, David Bailey, Joe Galuvao, Paul Staladi, Meti Noovao, Aaron Whittaker, Hitro Okesene, Steve Buckingham, Grant Young, Tony Tuimavave, Jerry Seu Seu, Bryan Henare. Bench: Ben Fahey, Frank Watene, Paul Rauhihi, Ricky Henry. Coach: Gary Kemble.

Under-19: Junior Lemafa, Odell Manuel, Tai Savea, Peter Lewis, Mark Fakahua, Monty Betham, Anthony Clyde, David Solomona, Lee Wetherill, Pewhairangi Jones, Kylie Leuluai, Filimone Lolohea, Ali Lauitiiti. Bench: Steve Murray, Scott Dewhurst, Fale Falemoe, Jonathan Smith. Coach: John Ackland.
