= 1998 Auckland Warriors season =

- NRL rank: 15th
- 1998 record: Wins: 7; draws: 0; losses: 15
- Points scored: For: 233; against: 243

Team information
- CEO: Bill MacGowan
- Coach: Frank Endacott
- Captain: Matthew Ridge
- Stadium: Ericsson Stadium
- Avg. attendance: 8,858

Top scorers
- Tries: Nigel Vagana (13)
- Goals: Matthew Ridge (51)
- Points: Matthew Ridge (110)
| ← 1997 | 1999 → |

The 1998 Auckland Warriors season was the 4th in the club's history. Coached by Frank Endacott and captained by Matthew Ridge, they competed in the 1998 NRL season, finishing the regular season 15th (out of 20 teams).

== Milestones ==
- 10 April – Round 5: Joe Vagana plays his 50th match for the club.
- 19 April – Round 6: Syd Eru plays his 50th match for the club.

== Jersey and sponsors ==

For 1998 the Warriors again used a similar style of jersey, produced by Nike, Inc. DB Bitter remained the major sponsor while Bartercard joined as the sleeve sponsor.

== Fixtures ==
The Warriors used Ericsson Stadium as their home ground in 1997, their only home ground since they entered the competition in 1995.

=== Pre-season trials ===
| Date | Round | Opponent | Venue | Result | Score | Tries | Goals | Attendance | Report |
|---|---|---|---|---|---|---|---|---|---|
| 13 February | Trial 1 | North Queensland Cowboys | Ericsson Stadium, Auckland | Lost | 22–26 | | | | |
| 22 February | Trial 2 | Auckland selection | Carlaw Park, Auckland | Win | 22–4 | | | | |
| 28 February | Trial 3 | Canterbury Bulldogs | Queen Elizabeth II Park, Christchurch | Win | 20–8 | Ngamu, Eru, N.Vagana | Ngamu (4) | | |

=== Regular season ===
| Date | Round | Opponent | Venue | Result | Score | Tries | Goals | Attendance | Report |
|---|---|---|---|---|---|---|---|---|---|
| 13 March | Round 1 | South Sydney Rabbitohs | Ericsson Stadium, Auckland | Loss | 18–24 | Ngamu, Kearney | Ngamu (5) | 9,500 | |
| 21 March | Round 2 | Newcastle Knights | EnergyAustralia Stadium, Newcastle | Loss | 4–33 | Hoppe | | 23,503 | |
| 27 March | Round 3 | Sydney City Roosters | Ericsson Stadium, Auckland | Win | 25–14 | Hoppe, Jones, Seuseu, N.Vagana | Ridge (4), Ngamu (FG) | 9,000 | |
| 4 April | Round 4 | St. George Dragons | Oki Jubilee Stadium, Sydney | Loss | 24–28 | N.Vagana (2), Ropati, Smith | Ridge (4) | 10,003 | |
| 10 April | Round 5 | Melbourne Storm | Ericsson Stadium, Auckland | Win | 16–12 | Hoppe, Jones, Tatupu | Ridge (2) | 14,503 | |
| 19 April | Round 6 | North Sydney Bears | North Sydney Oval, Sydney | Loss | 26–44 | Jones, Lauitiiti, Tatupu, N.Vagana | Ridge (5) | 10,945 | |
| 26 April | Round 7 | Newcastle Knights | Ericsson Stadium, Auckland | Loss | 14–38 | Ropati, N.Vagana | Ridge (3) | 7,500 | |
| 2 May | Round 8 | Sydney City Roosters | Sydney Football Stadium, Sydney | Loss | 4–22 | Oudenryn | | 5,308 | |
| 8 May | Round 9 | Cronulla Sharks | Ericsson Stadium, Auckland | Loss | 8–20 | Ropati | Ridge (2) | 7,500 | |
| 16 May | Round 10 | Canterbury Bulldogs | Belmore Sports Ground, Sydney | Win | 20–6 | Jones, Oudenryn, A.Swann | Ridge (4) | 5,224 | |
| 24 May | Round 11 | Canberra Raiders | Ericsson Stadium, Auckland | Win | 25–14 | Hoppe (2), N.Vagana (2) | Ridge (4), Whittaker (FG) | 8,000 | |
| 30 May | Round 12 | Parramatta Eels | Parramatta Stadium, Sydney | Loss | 6–14 | Kearney | Whittaker (1) | 13,218 | |
| 7 June | Round 13 | Penrith Panthers | Ericsson Stadium, Auckland | Win | 15–14 | Ngamu, Whittaker | Ngamu (3 & FG) | 7,000 | |
| 13 June | Round 14 | Western Suburbs Magpies | Campbelltown Sports Ground, Sydney | Loss | 16–18 | Jones, Oudenryn, Jones | Ngamu (2) | 5,933 | |
| 21 June | Round 15 | St. George Dragons | Ericsson Stadium, Auckland | Win | 31–14 | Eru, Jones, Kearney, Ropati, L.Swann | Ngamu (5 & FG) | 8,300 | |
| 27 June | Round 16 | Melbourne Storm | Olympic Park Stadium, Melbourne | Win | 24–21 | Eru, Galuvao, Ngamu, Tatupu | Ngamu (4) | 13,127 | |
| 4 July | Round 17 | Illawarra Steelers | Ericsson Stadium, Auckland | Loss | 17–14 | Eur, Kearney, J.Vagana | Jones (1) | 12,500 | |
| 11 July | Round 18 | Gold Coast Chargers | Carrara Stadium, Gold Coast | Loss | 18–31 | Endacott, Eru, Staladi | Ridge (3) | 5,490 | |
| 17 July | Round 19 | Balmain Tigers | Ericsson Stadium, Auckland | Win | 21–20 | Ridge, Tatupu, N.Vagana | Ridge (4), Jones (FG) | 6,000 | |
| 26 July | Round 20 | Adelaide Rams | Hindmarsh Stadium, Adelaide | Loss | 20–22 | Ridge, N.Vagana, J.Vagana | Ridge (4) | 7,445 | |
| 31 July | Round 21 | North Queensland Cowboys | Ericsson Stadium, Auckland | Win | 34–18 | N.Vagana (3), Iro (2), Staladi | Ridge (5) | 4,500 | |
| 9 August | Round 22 | South Sydney Rabbitohs | Sydney Football Stadium, Sydney | Loss | 18–20 | Lauitiiti (2), Seuseu | Ridge (3) | 3,733 | |
| 16 August | Round 23 | Brisbane Broncos | ANZ Stadium, Brisbane | Loss | 4–16 | | Ridge (2) | 16,456 | |
| 23 August | Round 24 | Manly Sea Eagles | Ericsson Stadium, Auckland | Loss | 12–38 | Kearney, Lauitiiti | Ridge (2) | 12,000 | |

=== Kiwi Trial matches ===
After the National Rugby League season had finished the Warriors played in two trial matches against a New Zealand XIII. These matches acted as a trial for the New Zealand national rugby league team before the October test against Australia and the tour of Great Britain.

| Date | Opponent | Venue | Result | Score | Report |
|---|---|---|---|---|---|
| 17 September | New Zealand XIII | Rugby Park, New Plymouth | Win | 66–4 | |
| 23 September | New Zealand XIII | Carlaw Park, Auckland | Win | 60–16 | |

== Ladder ==
1998 NRL season
| Pos | Team | Pld | W | D | L | PF | PA | PD | Pts |
|---|---|---|---|---|---|---|---|---|---|
| 1 | Brisbane Broncos (P) | 24 | 18 | 1 | 5 | 688 | 310 | +378 | 37 |
| 2 | Newcastle Knights | 24 | 18 | 1 | 5 | 562 | 381 | +181 | 37 |
| 3 | Melbourne Storm | 24 | 17 | 1 | 6 | 546 | 372 | +174 | 35 |
| 4 | Parramatta Eels | 24 | 17 | 1 | 6 | 468 | 349 | +119 | 35 |
| 5 | North Sydney Bears | 24 | 17 | 0 | 7 | 663 | 367 | +296 | 34 |
| 6 | Sydney City Roosters | 24 | 16 | 0 | 8 | 680 | 383 | +297 | 32 |
| 7 | Canberra Raiders | 24 | 15 | 0 | 9 | 564 | 429 | +135 | 30 |
| 8 | St. George Dragons | 24 | 13 | 1 | 10 | 486 | 490 | −4 | 27 |
| 9 | Canterbury-Bankstown Bulldogs | 24 | 13 | 0 | 11 | 489 | 411 | +78 | 26 |
| 10 | Manly Warringah Sea Eagles | 24 | 13 | 0 | 11 | 503 | 473 | +30 | 26 |
| 11 | Cronulla-Sutherland Sharks | 24 | 12 | 1 | 11 | 438 | 387 | +51 | 25 |
| 12 | Illawarra Steelers | 24 | 11 | 1 | 12 | 476 | 539 | −63 | 23 |
| 13 | Balmain Tigers | 24 | 9 | 1 | 14 | 381 | 463 | −82 | 19 |
| 14 | Penrith Panthers | 24 | 8 | 2 | 14 | 525 | 580 | −55 | 18 |
| 15 | Auckland Warriors | 24 | 9 | 0 | 15 | 417 | 518 | −101 | 18 |
| 16 | North Queensland Cowboys | 24 | 9 | 0 | 15 | 361 | 556 | −195 | 18 |
| 17 | Adelaide Rams | 24 | 7 | 0 | 17 | 393 | 615 | −222 | 14 |
| 18 | South Sydney Rabbitohs | 24 | 5 | 0 | 19 | 339 | 560 | −221 | 10 |
| 19 | Gold Coast Chargers | 24 | 4 | 0 | 20 | 289 | 654 | −365 | 8 |
| 20 | Western Suburbs Magpies | 24 | 4 | 0 | 20 | 371 | 802 | −431 | 8 |

(P) Premiers

== Squad ==
Twenty nine players were used by the club in 1998, including four players who made their first grade debuts.

| No. | Name | Nationality | Position | Warriors debut | App | T | G | FG | Pts |
|---|---|---|---|---|---|---|---|---|---|
| 3 | Sean Hoppe | (New Zealand) | WG | 10 March 1995 | 15 | 5 | 0 | 0 | 20 |
| 6 | Gene Ngamu | (New Zealand) | FE | 10 March 1995 | 17 | 3 | 19 | 3 | 53 |
| 11 | Stephen Kearney | (New Zealand) | SR | 10 March 1995 | 21 | 5 | 0 | 0 | 20 |
| 12 | Tony Tatupu | (New Zealand) | SR | 10 March 1995 | 19 | 4 | 0 | 0 | 16 |
| 13 | Tony Tuimavave | (New Zealand) | PR / LK | 10 March 1995 | 9 | 0 | 0 | 0 | 0 |
| 15 | Tea Ropati | (New Zealand) | CE / FE | 10 March 1995 | 15 | 4 | 0 | 0 | 16 |
| 18 | Joe Vagana | (New Zealand) | PR | 18 March 1995 | 22 | 2 | 0 | 0 | 8 |
| 19 | Syd Eru | (New Zealand) | HK | 28 March 1995 | 13 | 4 | 0 | 0 | 16 |
| 24 | Stacey Jones | (New Zealand) | HB | 23 April 1995 | 24 | 6 | 1 | 1 | 27 |
| 29 | Marc Ellis | (New Zealand) | FB / WG | 31 March 1996 | 2 | 0 | 0 | 0 | 0 |
| 32 | Nigel Vagana | (New Zealand) | CE | 4 April 1996 | 23 | 13 | 0 | 0 | 52 |
| 33 | Awen Guttenbeil | (New Zealand) | SR | 14 April 1996 | 10 | 0 | 0 | 0 | 0 |
| 36 | Anthony Swann | (New Zealand) | CE | 23 June 1996 | 9 | 1 | 0 | 0 | 4 |
| 37 | Brady Malam | (New Zealand) | PR | 23 June 1996 | 24 | 0 | 0 | 0 | 0 |
| 38 | Bryan Henare | (New Zealand) | SR | 23 July 1996 | 1 | 0 | 0 | 0 | 0 |
| 40 | Matthew Ridge | (New Zealand) | FB | 1 March 1997 | 18 | 2 | 51 | 0 | 110 |
| 42 | Logan Swann | (New Zealand) | SR | 1 March 1997 | 24 | 1 | 0 | 0 | 4 |
| 44 | Shane Endacott | (New Zealand) | FE | 29 March 1997 | 17 | 1 | 0 | 0 | 4 |
| 45 | Paul Staladi | (New Zealand) | WG | 27 April 1997 | 11 | 2 | 0 | 0 | 8 |
| 47 | Lee Oudenryn | (Australia) | WG | 6 July 1997 | 20 | 3 | 0 | 0 | 12 |
| 48 | Aaron Whittaker | (New Zealand) | HB | 29 June 1997 | 7 | 1 | 1 | 1 | 7 |
| 50 | Jerry Seu Seu | (New Zealand) | PR | 16 August 1997 | 17 | 2 | 0 | 0 | 8 |
| 51 | Kevin Iro | (New Zealand) | CE | 13 March 1998 | 16 | 2 | 0 | 0 | 8 |
| 52 | Quentin Pongia | (New Zealand) | PR | 13 March 1998 | 18 | 0 | 0 | 0 | 0 |
| 53 | Tyran Smith | (New Zealand) | SR | 13 March 1998 | 10 | 1 | 0 | 0 | 4 |
| 54 | Zane Clarke | (Cook Islands) | HK | 13 March 1998 | 5 | 0 | 0 | 0 | 0 |
| 55 | Ali Lauitiiti | (New Zealand) | SR | 19 April 1998 | 8 | 4 | 0 | 0 | 16 |
| 56 | Joe Galuvao | (New Zealand) | FB / CE | 2 May 1998 | 11 | 1 | 0 | 0 | 4 |
| 57 | Frank Watene | (New Zealand) | PR | 23 August 1998 | 1 | 0 | 0 | 0 | 0 |

== Staff ==
- Chief Executive Officer: Bill MacGowan

=== Coaching staff ===
- Head Coach: Frank Endacott

== Transfers ==
=== Gains ===
| Player | Previous club | Length | Notes |
|---|---|---|---|
| Tony Tatupu | Warrington Wolves | | Warrior 1995–1996 |
| Nigel Vagana | Warrington Wolves | | Warrior 1996 |
| Kevin Iro | Hunter Mariners | | |
| Quentin Pongia | Canberra Raiders | | |
| Tyran Smith | North Queensland Cowboys | | |

=== Losses ===
| Player | Club | Notes |
|---|---|---|
| Aaron Lester | Whitehaven | |
| Phil Blake | Retired | |
| Hitro Okesene | Wigan Warriors | |
| Denis Betts | Wigan Warriors | |
| Mark Horo | Retired | |
| Iva Ropati | Retired | |
| Grant Young | London Broncos | |
| Steve Buckingham | Mount Albert Lions | |
| Meti Noovao | Adelaide Rams | |

==== Mid-Season Losses ====
| Player | Club | Notes |
|---|---|---|
| Marc Ellis | North Harbour Rugby Union | |

== Other teams ==
Due to the axing of the Reserve grade competition the Auckland Warriors reserve team played in a series of matches against New Zealand Provincial sides.

| Date | Opponent | Result | Score | Venue | Report |
|---|---|---|---|---|---|
| March–April | Auckland | Win | 26–24 | Auckland | |
| March–April | Auckland | Win | 26–24 | Auckland | |
| 26 April | Waikato Cougars | Win | 54–0 | Ericsson Stadium, Auckland | |
| 2 May | Canterbury Reds | Win | 35–0 | Rugby League Park, Christchurch | |
| 24 May | Canterbury Reds | Win | 38–14 | Ericsson Stadium, Auckland | |
| | Northland Wild Boars | Win | 54–12 | Jubilee Park, Whangarei | |
| | Waikato Cougars | Win | 76–0 | Resthills Park, Hamilton | |
| | Coastline Mariners | Win | 66–6 | Tauranga Domain, Tauranga | |
| | West Coast Chargers | Win | 56–2 | Ericsson Stadium, Auckland | |
| | West Coast Chargers | Win | 46–8 | Wingham Park, West Coast | |
| | Hawkes Bay Unicorns | Win | 90–10 | Nelson Park, Hastings | |
| | Manawatu Mustangs | Win | 32–10 | Ericsson Stadium, Auckland | |
| | Manawatu Mustangs | Win | 54–4 | Foxton | |
| | Wellington Pumas | Win | 50–18 | Ericsson Stadium, Auckland | |
| | Wellington Pumas | Win | 44–10 | Hutt Valley | |
| | Taranaki Sharks | Win | 42–8 | New Plymouth | |
| | Taranaki Sharks | Win | 56–10 | Ericsson Stadium, Auckland | |
| August | Auckland | Win | 28–24 | Ericsson Stadium, Auckland | |

== Awards ==
Joe Vagana was the Player of the Year.
