= List of New Zealand Warriors representatives =

This is an incomplete list of rugby league players who have represented their country or representative team while playing for the Auckland Warriors or New Zealand Warriors and the years they achieved their honours, if known.

== International ==
=== New Zealand ===
Player	Years	Notes
Whetu Taewa	1995–1996	Never played a test match.
Richard Blackmore	1995–1997	Including 1995 World Cup.
Sean Hoppe	1995–1999	Including 1995 World Cup.
Stephen Kearney	1995–1997	Including 1995 World Cup.
Gene Ngamu	1995–1999	
Logan Edwards	1995	
Tony Tatupu	1995	
Hitro Okesene	1995	Including 1995 World Cup.
Syd Eru	1995–1998	Including 1995 World Cup.
Tony Tuimavave	1995	
Stacey Jones	1995–2005	Including 1995 & 2000 World Cups. Represented the All Golds in 2007.
Mark Horo	1996	
Marc Ellis	1996	
Joe Vagana	1996–2000	Including 2000 World Cup.
Anthony Swann	1996	
Tea Ropati	1995–1997	
Matthew Ridge	1997–1998	
Grant Young	1997	
Logan Swann	1996–2003	Including 2000 World Cup.
Kevin Iro	1998	
Quentin Pongia	1998	
Tyran Smith	1998	
Nigel Vagana	1998–2000	Including 2000 World Cup. Represented the All Golds in 2007.
Terry Hermansson	1999	
Ali Lauitiiti	2000–2004	Including 2000 World Cup. Represented the All Golds in 2007.
Motu Tony	2001–2003	
Henry Fa'afili	2001–2004	
Clinton Toopi	2001–2006	Represented the All Golds in 2007.
Francis Meli	2001–2004	
Monty Betham	2001–2005	
Jerry Seu Seu	2001–2004	
Lance Hohaia	2002–2011	Including 2008 World Cup.
Awen Guttenbeil	2002–2005	Represented the All Golds in 2007.
Vinnie Anderson	2003–2005	
Sione Faumuina	2003–2004	
Thomas Leuluai	2003–2016	Represented the All Golds in 2007. Including 2008 and 2013 World Cups.
Tevita Leo-Latu	2004	
Brent Webb	2004–2006	
Louis Anderson	2004–2007	Represented the All Golds in 2007.
Wairangi Koopu	2004–2005	
Ruben Wiki	2005–2006	Captained the All Golds in 2007.
Jerome Ropati	2005–2009	Including 2008 World Cup.
Manu Vatuvei	2005–2015	Including 2008 and 2013 World Cups.
Iafeta Paleaaesina	2005	
Simon Mannering	2006–2017	Including 2008, 2013 and 2017 World Cups.
Nathan Fien	2006–2009	Including 2008 World Cup.
Epalahame Lauaki	2007	Represented the All Golds in 2007.
Sam Rapira	2007–2011	Including 2008 World Cup.
Evarn Tuimavave	2008	Including 2008 World Cup.
Ben Matulino	2009–2015	Including 2013 World Cup.
Aaron Heremaia	2010	
Lewis Brown	2011	
Kevin Locke	2011-2013	Including 2013 World Cup.
Russell Packer	2011	
Elijah Taylor	2011-2013	Including 2013 World Cup.
Bill Tupou	2011	
Shaun Johnson	2012-2017	Including 2013 and 2017 World Cups.
Ben Henry	2014	
Siliva Havili	2014	
Suaia Matagi	2014	
Tuimoala Lolohea	2015	
Issac Luke	2016-2017	
David Fusitu'a	2016	
Solomone Kata]	2016	
Roger Tuivasa-Sheck	2017	Including 2017 World Cup.
Kieran Foran	2017	

=== Australia ===
Player	Years	Notes
Richard Villasanti	2003	
Steve Price	2005–2009	Including 2008 World Cup.
Brent Tate	2008-2010	Including 2008 World Cup.

=== Cook Islands ===
Player	Years	Notes
Dominique Peyroux	2013	Including 2013 World Cup.
Hikule'o Malu	2013	Including 2013 World Cup.
Charnze Nicoll-Klokstad	2017	

=== England ===
Player	Years	Notes
Denis Betts	1995	Including 1995 World Cup.
Andy Platt	1995	Including 1995 World Cup.
Sam Tomkins	2014	

=== Fiji ===
Player	Years	Notes
Meli Koliavu	2009	

=== Great Britain ===
Player	Years	Notes
Denis Betts	1996–1997	

=== Italy ===
Player	Years	Notes
Paul Dezolt	2004	

=== Tonga ===
Player	Years	Notes
Duane Mann	1995	Including 1995 World Cup.
Talite Liava'a	2000	Including 2000 World Cup.
Epalahame Lauaki	2008	Including 2008 World Cup.
Ukuma Ta'ai	2009-10	
Siuatonga Likiliki	2009	
Sione Lousi	2010	
Glen Fisiiahi	2013	Including 2013 World Cup.
Konrad Hurrell	2013-2015	Including 2013 World Cup.
Siliva Havili	2013	Including 2013 World Cup.
Solomone Kata	2014-2017	Including 2017 World Cup.
Agnatius Paasi	2014	
Tuimoala Lolohea	2015-2017	
Albert Vete	2015	
David Fusitua	2016-2017	Including 2017 World Cup.
Manu Vatuvei	2017	
Mafoa'aeata Hingano	2017	Including 2017 World Cup.

=== (Western) Samoa ===
Player	Years	Notes
Tony Tatupu	1995–1996	Including 1995 World Cup.
Tony Tuimavave	1995–1997	Including 1995 World Cup.
Joe Vagana	1995	Including 1995 World Cup.
Tea Ropati	1995–1996	Including 1995 World Cup.
Se'e Solomona	1995	Including 1995 World Cup.
Willie Poching	1995	Including 1995 World Cup.
Logan Swann	1997	
Henry Fa'afili	2000	Including 2000 World Cup.
Monty Betham	2000	Including 2000 World Cup.
Francis Meli	2000	Including 2000 World Cup.
Jerry Seu Seu	1997–2000	Including 2000 World Cup.
Joe Galuvao	2000	
Malo Solomona	2006	
Wayne McDade	2008	Including 2008 World Cup.
Patrick Ah Van	2009	
Carlos Tuimavave	2013-2014	
Pita Godinet	2013	Including 2013 World Cup.
Michael Sio	2013-2014	Including 2013 World Cup.
Suaia Matagi	2013-2014	Including 2013 World Cup.
Dominique Peyroux	2014-2015	
Sam Lisone	2015-2017	Including 2017 World Cup.
Erin Clark	2016	
Ken Maumalo	2016-2017	Including 2017 World Cup.
Mason Lino	2016	
Bunty Afoa	2016-2017	Including 2017 World Cup.
James Gavet	2016	
Jazz Tevaga	2017	Including 2017 World Cup.

=== Scotland ===
Player	Years	Notes
Ian Henderson	2008	Including 2008 World Cup.
James Bell	2017	Including 2017 World Cup.

=== United States ===
Player	Years	Notes
Bureta Faraimo	2017	Including 2017 World Cup.

=== Wales ===
Player	Years	Notes
Justin Morgan	2002	

== Other honours ==
=== All Golds ===
Player	Years	Notes
Louis Anderson	2007	
Ruben Wiki	2007-2008	
Steve Price	2007	
Epalahame Lauaki	2007	
Logan Swann	2008	
Lance Hohaia	2008	
Jerome Ropati	2008	
Manu Vatuvei	2008	
Nathan Fien	2008	
Evarn Tuimavave	2008	

=== Australian Prime Minister's XIII ===
Player	Years	Notes
Steve Price	2005-2006	
Micheal Luck	2010	
James Maloney	2010	
Joshua Curran	2022	

=== Indigenous All Stars ===
Player	Years	Notes
Joel Moon	2011	
Dane Nielsen	2013	

=== New South Wales ===
Player	Years	Notes
Ryan Hoffman	2015	

=== New South Wales City ===
Player	Years	Notes
Wade McKinnon	2009	
Feleti Mateo	2012-2013	

=== New Zealand Māori ===
Player	Years	Notes
Gavin Hill	1996	
Terry Hermansson	2000	Including 2000 World Cup.
Clinton Toopi	2000	Including 2000 World Cup.
Paul Whatuira	2000	Including 2000 World Cup.
Henry Perenara	2000	Including 2000 World Cup.
Odell Manuel	2000	Including 2000 World Cup.
Wairangi Koopu	2000–2008	Including 2000 World Cup.
Kevin Locke	2008-2010	
Aaron Heremaia	2010	
Lewis Brown	2010	

=== World/NRL All Stars ===
Player	Years	Notes
Manu Vatuvei	2010, 2012, 2015	
Feleti Mateo	2011, 2013	
Shaun Johnson	2013	
Nathan Friend	2015	
Konrad Hurrell	2016	
Ryan Hoffman	2016	
Sam Lisone	2017	

=== Queensland ===
Player	Years	Notes
Kevin Campion	2001–2002	
PJ Marsh	2002–2003	
Steve Price	2005–2009	
Brent Tate	2008	
Jacob Lillyman	2011-2017	

== Representative Captains ==
=== New Zealand ===
Player	Years	Notes
Stephen Kearney	1997	
Matthew Ridge	1997	
Quentin Pongia	1998	
Stacey Jones	2002	
Ruben Wiki	2005-2006	
Simon Mannering	2013-2015	

=== All Golds ===
Player	Years	Notes
Ruben Wiki	2007-2008	

== Coaching staff ==
=== International ===
==== New Zealand ====
Player	Years	Notes
Frank Endacott	1995–1998	Warriors Reserve Coach 1995–1997, Warriors Head Coach 1997–1998. Including 1995 World Cup.
Daniel Anderson	2003–2004	Warriors Head Coach.

==== Samoa ====
Player	Years	Notes
John Ackland	2006–2008	Warriors Assistant Coach. Including 2008 World Cup.
