= Steve Buckingham =

Steven or Steve Buckingham may refer to:

- Steve Buckingham (rugby league), New Zealand rugby league footballer who played in the 1990s, and coach
- Steve Buckingham (record producer), American record producer
