= List of Auckland Vulcans results =

This is a page listing the results of the Auckland Vulcans in the New South Wales Cup Rugby League competition. The Vulcans were known as the Auckland Lions in 2007.

== NSWRL Premier League ==
=== 2007 ===
- Round 1 vs Parramatta Eels, won 27-8, Mt Smart Stadium
- Round 2 vs Newtown Jets, lost 18–38, Mt Smart Stadium
- Round 3 vs Canterbury Bulldogs, lost 28–32, Telstra Stadium
- Round 4 vs Manly Sea Eagles, won 29-16, Brookvale Oval
- Round 5 vs St George Illawarra Dragons, won 26-20, Mt Smart Stadium
- Round 6 vs Bye
- Round 7 vs North Sydney Bears, lost 10–46, North Sydney Oval
- Round 8 vs Cronulla Sharks, lost 24–26, Mt Smart Stadium
- Round 9 vs Newcastle Knights, lost 4–14, EnergyAustralia Stadium
- Round 10 vs Balmain Ryde Eastwood Tigers, lost 18–28, Mt Smart Stadium
- Round 11 vs Parramatta Eels, lost 22–30, Parramatta Stadium
- Round 12 vs Canterbury Bulldogs, lost 16–36, Mt Smart Stadium
- Round 13 vs Manly Sea Eagles, won 10-8, Mt Smart Stadium
- Round 14 vs Cronulla Sharks, lost 16–34, Toyota Park
- Round 15 vs Penrith Panthers, lost 14–36, Mt Smart Stadium
- Round 16 vs Bye
- Round 17 vs Balmain Ryde Eastwood Tigers, won 28-26, Leichhardt Oval
- Round 18 vs St George Illawarra Dragons, lost 20–24, Mt Smart Stadium
- Round 19 vs Western Suburbs Magpies, won 42-22, Campbelltown Sports Ground
- Round 20 vs Newcastle Knights, won 54-26, Mt Smart Stadium
- Round 21 vs Newtown Jets, won 19-16, Henson Park
- Round 22 vs Canterbury Bulldogs, won 27-26, Mt Smart Stadium
- Round 23 vs Canberra Raiders, lost 10–36, Canberra Stadium
- Round 24 vs Bye
- Round 25 vs Penrith Panthers, lost 16–38, CUA Stadium

== New South Wales Cup ==
=== 2008 ===
- Round 1 vs Central Coast Storm, lost 20–22, Henham Park (Auckland)
- Round 2 vs Wentworthville Magpies, lost 10–34, Ringrose Park
- Round 3 vs Central Newcastle Knights, won 44–18, Henham Park
- Round 4 vs Newtown Jets, won 23–22, Henson Park
- Round 5 vs Balmain Ryde Eastwood Tigers, lost 18–30, Leichhardt Oval
- Round 6 vs Cronulla Cobras, won 33–30, Harold Moody Park (Auckland)
- Round 7 vs Windsor Wolves, won 41–24, venue unknown, (Auckland)
- Round 8 vs North Sydney Bears, lost 18–48, North Sydney Oval
- Round 9 vs Manly Sea Eagles, lost 34–37, Brookvale Oval
- Round 10 vs Western Suburbs Magpies, lost 16–46, Mt Smart #2
- Round 11 vs Wentworthville Magpies, lost 16–34, Mt Smart #2
- Round 12 vs Central Newcastle Knights, lost 4-52, venue unknown (Newcastle)
- Round 13 vs Central Coast Storm, won 40-24, Morry Breen Oval
- Round 14 vs Canterbury Bulldogs, won 40-26, Mt Smart #2
- Round 15 vs North Sydney Bears, lost 16–54, Mt Smart #2
- Round 16 vs Cronulla Cobras, lost 20–26, Toyota Park
- Round 17 vs Newtown Jets, won 32-12, Mt Smart #2
- Round 18 vs Windsor Wolves, won 24-18, Windsor Sports Complex
- Round 19 vs Western Suburbs Magpies, lost 24–30, Campbelltown Sports Ground
- Round 20 vs Balmain-Ryde Eastwood Tigers, lost 26–30, Mt Smart #2
- Round 21 vs Canterbury Bulldogs, lost 16–46, Crest Stadium
- Round 22 vs Manly Sea Eagles, won 34-26, Mt Smart #2

=== 2009 ===
- Round 1 vs Balmain-Ryde Eastwood Tigers, lost 20–21, Western Springs Stadium (Auckland)
- Round 2 vs Windsor Wolves, won 30-18, Windsor Sports Complex
- Round 3 vs Central Coast Storm, draw 20-20, Henham Park
- Round 4 vs Shellharbour Dragons, won 20-12, Ron Costello Oval
- Round 5 vs Newtown Jets, lost 24–26, Walter Massey Park (Auckland)
- Round 6 vs Bankstown City Bulldogs, lost 26–46, Terry Lamb Sports Complex
- Round 7 vs North Sydney Bears, lost 12–36, North Sydney Oval
- Round 8 vs Bye
- Round 9 vs Balmain-Ryde Eastwood Tigers, lost 12–42, Leichhardt Oval
- Round 10 vs Wentworthville Magpies, won 32-16, Mt Smart #2
- Round 11 vs Cronulla Sharks, lost 16–38, Toyota Park
- Round 12 vs Windsor Wolves, won 46-6, Mt Smart #2
- Round 13 vs Bye
- Round 14 vs Central Coast Storm, lost 6-50, Morry Breen Oval
- Round 15 vs Western Suburbs Magpies, lost 20–30, Mt Smart #2
- Round 16 vs Newtown Jets, lost 26–36, Henson Park
- Round 17 vs North Sydney Bears, lost 8-28, Mt Smart #2
- Round 18 vs Wentworthville Magpies, lost 0-58, Ringrose Park
- Round 19 vs Cronulla Sharks, lost 22–38, Mt Smart #2
- Round 20 vs Shellharbour Dragons, lost 20–44, Mt Smart #2
- Round 21 vs Western Suburbs Magpies, lost 12–66, Campbelltown Sports Ground
- Round 22 vs Bankstown City Bulls, lost 8-68, Henham Park

=== 2010 ===
- Round 1 vs Cronulla Sharks, lost 18–36, Windsor Sports Complex
- Round 2 vs Windsor Wolves, lost 28–46, Windsor Sports Complex
- Round 3 vs Shellharbour Dragons, lost 18–48, Ron Costello Oval
- Round 4 vs Balmain-Ryde Eastwood Tigers, won 38-14, Mt Smart #2
- Round 5 vs Newtown Jets, lost 22–44, Henson Park
- Round 6 vs Canterbury Bankstown Bulldogs, lost 28–40, Mt Smart #2
- Round 7 vs Cronulla Sharks, won 38-34, Toyota Park
- Round 8 vs Melbourne Storm, lost 22–24, Mt Smart #2
- Round 9 vs Windsor Wolves, lost 24–44, Windsor Sports Complex
- Round 10 vs North Sydney Bears, won 34-10, Mt Smart #2
- Round 11 vs Shellharbour Dragons, won 41-18, Mt Smart #2
- Round 12 vs Central Coast Centurions, won 37-24, Morry Breen Oval
- Round 13 vs Wentworthville Magpies, won 34-22, Mt Smart #2
- Round 14 vs Western Suburbs Magpies, lost 20–30, Campbelltown Sports Ground
- Round 15 vs Windsor Wolves, lost 16–40, Mt Smart #2
- Round 16 vs Balmain-Ryde Eastwood Tigers, lost 14–48, Leichhardt Oval
- Round 17 vs Bye
- Round 18 Canterbury Bulldogs, lost 0-54, Crest Stadium
- Round 19 vs Central Coast Centurions, lost 16–38, Mt Smart #2
- Round 20 vs Wentworthville Magpies, lost 24–32, Ringrose Park
- Round 21 vs Cronulla Sharks, won 44-34, Mt Smart #2
- Round 22 vs Shellharbour Dragons, lost 20–50, Ron Costello Oval
- Round 23 vs Newtown Jets, lost 22–26, Mt Smart Stadium
- Round 24 vs Melbourne Storm, lost 24–34, Olympic Park Stadium
- Round 25 vs Western Suburbs Magpies, lost 28–29, Mt Smart Stadium
- Round 26 vs North Sydney Bears, won 32-28, North Sydney Oval
