= Glen Coughlan =

New Zealand rugby league footballer

Personal information
- Born: 3 February 1963 (age 63) New Zealand

Playing information
- Position: Fullback
Club
Years	Team	Pld	T	G	FG	P
	Halswell (CRL)
1989–94	Dewsbury Rams	133	34	0	0	136
1994–95	Canterbury Cardinals
	Total	133	34	0	0	136
Representative
Years	Team	Pld	T	G	FG	P
	Canterbury

Glen Coughlan is a New Zealand rugby league player who played professionally for the Dewsbury Rams.

== Playing career ==
Coughlan was a Halswell Hornets junior and played in the Canterbury Rugby League competition. He spent 1984 playing in the Illawarra Rugby League for the Dapto Canaries, where he won their under-21 award.

Coughlan spent both the 1989–90 and 1993-94 seasons with the Dewsbury Rams in England. He returned to New Zealand in 1994, playing for the Canterbury Country Cardinals in the new Lion Red Cup competition. In 1995 Coughlan scored 182 points for the Cardinals, being the top point scorer in the 1994 Lion Red Cup. That year he represented both Canterbury and a Lion Red XIII that played Tonga.

Coughlan joined the Auckland Warriors in 1997 and was part of their side that lost the 1997 Reserve Grade grand final.
