= Zane Clark =

Cook Islands international rugby league footballer

Zane Clarke
Personal information
- Born: New Zealand
- Weight: 76 kg (12 st 0 lb)

Playing information
- Position: Hooker
Club
Years	Team	Pld	T	G	FG	P
1994–96	Hutt Valley Firehawks	35	2	0	0	8
1998	Auckland Warriors	5	0	0	0	0
	Total	40	2	0	0	8
Representative
Years	Team	Pld	T	G	FG	P
2000	Cook Islands	3	0	0	0	0

Zane Clark is a former Cook Islands international rugby league footballer who played as a hooker in the 1990s and 2000s. He at club level for the Randwick Kingfishers, Hutt Valley Firehawks, Auckland Warriors and the Cessnock Goannas.

== Background ==
Clark was born in New Zealand.

He is of Cook Islands descent.

== Early years ==
A product of the Randwick Kingfishers club in the Wellington local competition, Clark made the Junior Kiwis in 1994 while played for the Hutt Valley Firehawks in the Lion Red Cup.

== Warriors ==
Clark was signed by the Auckland Warriors for the 1998 season as a backup to Syd Eru. When Eru was injured Clark made five first grade appearances for the Warriors.

He was not re-signed for the 1999 season and instead moved to Australia and played for Cessnock Goannas in the local Newcastle Rugby League competition.

== World Cup ==
Clark was named in the Cook Islands squad for the 2000 Rugby League World Cup and played in all three of the team's matches.
