= Mike Setefano =

Samoa international rugby league player

Personal information
- Full name: Michael Setefano

Playing information
- Position: Prop
Club
Years	Team	Pld	T	G	FG	P
1994	Auckland City	19	5	0	0	20
1995–96	North Harbour	29	6	0	0	24
	Total	48	11	0	0	44
Representative
Years	Team	Pld	T	G	FG	P
1992–96	Western Samoa	7	3	0	0	12

Mike Setefano is a former Samoa international rugby league footballer who played at the 1995 Rugby League World Cup.

== Playing career ==
In 1987, Setefano was selected for the Junior Kiwis tour of Great Britain.

Setefano played for the Auckland City Vulcans in the 1994 Lion Red Cup, and toured New Zealand with Western Samoa in 1994. In 1995 he joined the North Harbour Sea Eagles, and was part of the team that won the 1995 Lion Red Cup.

Setefano represented Western Samoa at international level, and played in the 1992 Pacific Cup, scoring two tries in their 18–12 win against Tonga in the final. He was also part of the squad for the 1994 Pacific Cup and 1996 Pacific Challenge.
