= North Harbour Sea Eagles =

Defunct NZ rugby league club, based in Auckland

Club information
- Founded: 1994; 32 years ago
- Exited: 1996; 30 years ago

Former details
- Grounds: Birkenhead War Memorial; Onewa Domain
- Coach: Graeme Norton / Dominic Clark
- Competition: Lion Red Cup

Records
- Premierships: 1994, 1995

The North Harbour Sea Eagles were a New Zealand rugby league club that represented the North Shore and Rodney District in the Lion Red Cup from 1994 to 1996. For the first two seasons they were coached by Graeme Norton.

There two main feeder clubs were the Northcote Tigers and the Hibiscus Coast Raiders who both played in the first division of the Auckland Rugby League competition.

== Notable players ==
Notable players included Ken McIntosh, Brian McClennan, 1994 captain Duane Mann, Fa'ausu Afoa, Paul Rauhihi, 1995 captain Don Stewart, Mike Setefano, Paki Tuimavave, Tony Tatupu, Latham Tawhai and Joe Vagana.

== Notable Matches ==
In 1995 the Sea Eagles defeated the touring French side 40–10.

They also won the 1994 Lion Red Cup grand final against the Counties Manukau Heroes 24-16 and the 1995 Lion Red Cup grand final against the Auckland Warriors Colts 28–21. In the 1996 Lion Red Cup they lost the Elimination Semifinal 14–20 to the Waikato Cougars.

== Season results ==
Season	Pld	W	D	L	PF	PA	PD	Pts	Position	Finals
1994	22	16	0	6	514	295	219	32	Third	Champions
1995	22	13	1	8	601	379	222	27	Third	Champions
1996	22	15	0	7	624	393	231	30	Third	Lost Elimination Semifinal
