= John Monie =

Australian former RL coach and professional rugby league footballer

Personal information
- Full name: John Stephen Monie
- Born: 6 October 1946 (age 79) Woy Woy, New South Wales, Australia

Playing information
- Position: Stand-off
Club
Years	Team	Pld	T	G	FG	P
1968–70	Cronulla-Sutherland	48	10	0	1	32

Coaching information
Club
Years	Team	Gms	W	D	L	W%
1984–89	Parramatta Eels	149	86	1	62	58
1989–93	Wigan	172	136	4	32	79
1995–97	Auckland Warriors	61	30	0	31	49
1998–99	Wigan Warriors	46	37	0	9	80
2000	London Broncos	28	6	0	22	21
	Total	456	295	5	156	65
Representative
Years	Team	Gms	W	D	L	W%
2005–08	France	7	1	0	6	14

John Stephen Monie (born 6 October 1946) is an Australian former professional rugby league footballer who played in the 1960s and 1970s, and coached in the 1980s, 1990s and 2000s. He is probably best known for his coaching career where he won premierships in both Australia and England.

== Playing career ==
Monie was a Standoff who played for his local club on the Central Coast, Woy Woy. After playing in over 100 first grade games for Woy Woy, in 1968 he moved to the Cronulla-Sutherland Sharks. In 1968, in a game against Newtown, he became the first Cronulla player to score four tries in a match. He was named the Sharks' Player of the Year in 1969.

Monie played for the Cronulla side for three seasons, almost making the Australian touring team.

== Coaching career ==
Monie began his coaching career at his old Woy Woy club. However he soon moved back to Parramatta to act as an assistant coach under the legendary Jack Gibson. When Gibson retired in 1984 Monie took over and he led Parramatta to a Grand Final victory in 1986 over Canterbury, winning 4–2.

He moved to Wigan in 1989. He guided the team to four consecutive league Championship and Challenge Cup doubles. During the 1991–92 Rugby Football League season, Monie coached defending champions Wigan to their 1991 World Club Challenge victory against the visiting Penrith Panthers. During the 1992–93 Rugby Football League season Monie coached Wigan, again defending RFL champions, in the 1992 World Club Challenge against the visiting Brisbane Broncos but lost.

In 1995 he returned to the Australasian competition, being made head coach of the new Auckland Warriors franchise. Monie left halfway through the 1997 season.

Monie then returned to Wigan for the 1998 season and guided them to a Super League Grand Final victory but failed to land the double after losing 17–8 to Sheffield in the Challenge Cup final. Monie stayed with Wigan until the end of 1999 when he moved to the London Broncos. Monie left London at the end of the 2000 season. He assisted coach Wayne Bennett while he was coaching Newcastle Knights . In 2006 he was hired by the Cronulla-Sutherland Sharks to review the club after a series of very poor performances.

Between 2005 and 2008 Monie was the head coach of the France national rugby league team.
