= Auckland Lions =

Defunct NZ rugby league club, based in Auckland

Club information
- Founded: 2006
- Exited: 2008; 17 years ago

Former details
- Grounds: Mt Smart Stadium; Fowlds Park
- Coach: Graeme Norton, Brent Gemmell
- Competition: Bartercard Cup

Records
- Premierships: 2006, 2007
- Minor premierships: 2006, 2007

The Auckland Lions were a rugby league club that had teams in both the New Zealand Bartercard Cup and the NSWRL Premier League. They were mostly drawn from the Mt Albert Lions Rugby League club. Mt Albert had a proud tradition in Auckland and had previously won two Bartercard Cup competitions as a stand-alone club.

The Bartercard franchise wore a yellow jersey with a blue V, while the Premier League side wore royal blue jerseys with a white V.

In 2008 the Bartercard Cup was discontinued and the Auckland franchise in the New South Wales Cup was renamed the Auckland Vulcans.

== NSWRL Premier League ==
=== 2007 Results ===
Premier League Logo

In 2007 the Lions competed in the Sydney-based NSWRL Premier League. Graeme Norton was appointed coach for the side in 2007. The Lions acted as the official reserve grade side for the New Zealand Warriors. The team was composed of Auckland Rugby League talent and Warriors players not taking part in first grade action. The New Zealand national rugby league team coach at the time, Brian McClennan, served as Director of Football for the first few weeks of the season before stepping down to concentrate on the National side.

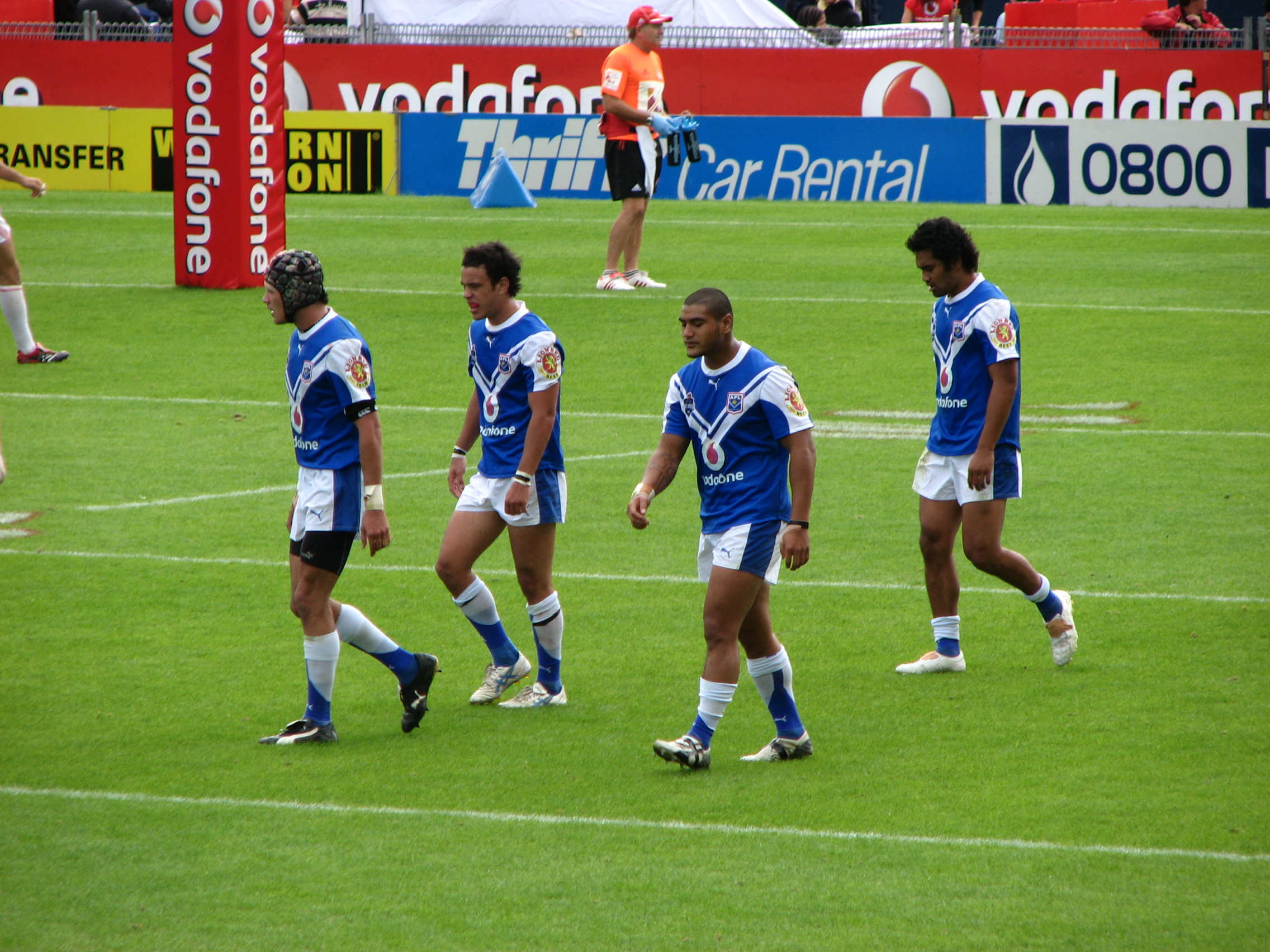
Auckland Lions Premier League players during a match against St George Illawarra

Their first game was a stunning 27–8 victory over the reigning Premiers, the Parramatta Eels. After several good early performances including upsetting a Dragons team with a lot of first grade talent, the Lions season started to slide with a six match losing streak that was broken in Round 13 with a 10–8 victory over the Manly Sea Eagles at Mt Smart Stadium. Following another two game slump, the Lions embarked on a streak, winning four out of five games to re-enter unlikely finals contention. A loss to Canberra in their penultimate game of the season saw their finals hopes evaporate, and a depleted Lions squad lost heavily to Penrith to end their first season in Premier League. The Lions finished a creditable 10th spot, just two wins outside of the top eight.

The Lions were renamed the Auckland Vulcans in 2008, as they no longer had any affiliation with Mt Albert.

| Season 2007 | Pld | W | D | L | B | PF | PA | PD | Pts |
|---|---|---|---|---|---|---|---|---|---|
| Finished 10th (13 Teams) | 22 | 9 | 0 | 13 | 3 | 478 | 586 | -108 | 24 |

== Bartercard Cup ==
=== 2006 Results ===
| Season 2006 | Pld | W | D | L | PF | PA | PD | Pts |
|---|---|---|---|---|---|---|---|---|
| Finished First (10 Teams) | 18 | 16 | 1 | 1 | 888 | 217 | 617 | 33 |

The Lions started 2006 where Brian McClennan left off in 2005, on a winning note. They dominated the competition, losing only two matches in 2006 and claiming the Minor Premiership. They then defeated the Canterbury Bulls 27–14, earning another bye and qualifying for the Grand Final. They won the Grand Final 25–18, again defeating the Canterbury Bulls..

=== 2007 Results ===
The 2007 Bartercard Cup kicked off on April 14 and despite now fielding a Premier League side the Lions were still able to dominate the Bartercard Cup. Unbeaten after eight rounds they racked up some big scores including thrashings of the Counties Manukau Jetz (62-0), Waicoa Bay Stallions (64-4), Central Falcons (84-0) and Northern Storm (70-8). They again won the minor premiership and after the major semi final against Harbour League went 117 minutes they won 44-40 and advanced to the Grand Final when they again accounted for Harbour League to win the last Bartercard Cup.

| Season 2007 | Pld | W | D | L | PF | PA | PD | Pts |
|---|---|---|---|---|---|---|---|---|
| Finished First (10 Teams) | 18 | 16 | 1 | 1 | 888 | 217 | 617 | 33 |

== See also ==
- Rugby league in New Zealand
