= Graeme Norton =

New Zealand rugby league footballer and coach

Playing information
Club
Years	Team	Pld	T	G	FG	P
	Northcote

Coaching information
Club
Years	Team	Gms	W	D	L	W%
1990–92	Northcote
1994–95	North Harbour
	Total	0	0	0	0
Representative
Years	Team	Gms	W	D	L	W%
1997	New Zealand (Tri-Series)	2	0	0	2	0

Graeme Norton is a New Zealand former professional rugby league footballer and coach. He became coach of the New Zealand national rugby league team in 1997.

== Initial career ==
After a playing career with the Northcote Tigers, Norton became the Tigers' head coach. He led Northcote to two Fox Memorial grand final wins and a National Club knockout championship.

Norton first came to national attention while in charge of the North Harbour Sea Eagles in the Lion Red Cup. He was in charge for both the 1994 & 1995 seasons, in which they won back-to-back premierships. In both years he also won the Sam Johnson Cup for Harbour Sports' Coach of the Year.

With the New Zealand Rugby League joining Super League, Norton was appointed to coach the New Zealand nines team in the Super League World Nines competition. The team won the competition in Fiji in 1996 and again in Townsville in 1997.

In 1997, he also coached the New Zealand side in the Super League Tri-series. The team lost to both Queensland and New South Wales.

After this, Norton all but retired from coaching. His contribution to the game was limited to his son's Under-16s team.

== Later years ==
Norton returned to national prominence when he was appointed assistant coach of the New Zealand national rugby league team by Brian McClennan in 2005. The Kiwis were hugely successful, winning the 2005 Rugby League Tri-Nations tournament.

In 2007, he stepped down from this position to coach the Auckland Lions club in the NSWRL Premier League.

In 2014, he again coached the Northcote Tigers in the Auckland Rugby League competition.
