= Willie Swann =

Samoa international rugby league footballer

Personal information
- Full name: William Swann
- Born: 25 February 1974 (age 52) Auckland, New Zealand

Playing information
- Position: Scrum-half
Club
Years	Team	Pld	T	G	FG	P
1996–97	Warrington Wolves	37	13	0	0	52
2001–04	Leigh Centurions	99	32	0	0	128
	Total	136	45	0	0	180
Representative
Years	Team	Pld	T	G	FG	P
1995–00	Samoa	6	2	0	0	8
- Relatives: Anthony Swann (brother); Logan Swann (cousin)

Willie Swann (born 1974) is a New Zealand former professional rugby league footballer and coach of Samoan heritage. He currently coaches the Auckland Vulcans in the New South Wales Cup. He is a former Samoa international and vice-captain. He also played for the Warrington Wolves, Leigh Centurions and the Auckland Warriors.

== Playing career ==
Swann was a Marist Saints junior who played fifteen matches for the Waitakere City Raiders in the 1994 Lion Red Cup, scoring 29 points. He was a Junior Kiwi in 1993. He played for the Auckland Warriors Colts in 1995. He was an Auckland Warrior 1995-1996 where he played a crucial role in laying a platform for the reserve grade to reach the 1996 grand final.

For Samoa, he played in both the 1995 and 2000 World Cups scoring 5 points.

== Later years ==
In 2006 and 2007 Swann worked as a supply and rugby teacher in Great Sankey High School, Cheshire, England. He coached the G.S.H.S Year 10 (2006–07), rugby league team to both the North West and National finals, narrowly losing 19–18 in Uxbridge.

Between 2009 and 2010 he was the head coach of the East Coast Bays Barracudas alongside Joe Vagana. He was an old boy at Liston College, and is now a teacher and dean there.

In 2012, he was appointed the New Zealand Warriors new Development coach. He was originally appointed the Warriors Toyota Cup assistant coach for the 2013 season before taking a role as the Auckland Vulcans NSW Cup head coach. He was an assistant NSW Cup coach for the Warriors in 2015 and in 2016 he coached the Mount Albert Lions.

== Personal life ==
His brother, Anthony Swann, and cousin, Logan Swann, both also played rugby league professionally.
