= Don Stewart (rugby league) =

Western Samoa international rugby league footballer

Personal information
- Full name: Donald Stewart
- Born: 11 April 1967 (age 58)
- Height: 185 cm (6 ft 1 in)
- Weight: 113 kg (17 st 11 lb)

Playing information
- Position: Centre, Prop, Second-row
Club
Years	Team	Pld	T	G	FG	P
	Northcote Tigers
1994–96	North Harbour	65	34	0	0	136
	Total	65	34	0	0	136
Representative
Years	Team	Pld	T	G	FG	P
1986–98	Auckland
1994	Western Samoa

Donald Stewart (born 11 April 1967) is a former Western Samoa international rugby league footballer.

== Playing career ==
A Northcote Tigers junior, Stewart began his career at Centre before moving into the forward pack. He won four Fox Memorial titles with Northcote between 1989 and 1993.

In 1994 Stewart joined the North Harbour Sea Eagles in the new Lion Red Cup, and was part of the Grand Final winning team. He was also picked by Western Samoa when they conducted a tour of New Zealand in the middle of the year.

Stewart captained the Sea Eagles in 1995, scoring 16 tries and again being part of a grand final winning side. Stewart was again part of the side in 1996, although they couldn't manage a third consecutive championship win. When the Lion Red Cup ended in 1996, Stewart had played in 65 matches and scored 34 tries.

In 1997 and 1998 Stewart represented Auckland in the National Provincial Competitions.
