= Stuart Lester =

New Zealand rugby league footballer

Personal information
- Born: 8 February 1975 (age 50); New Zealand

Playing information
- Position: Second-row
Club
Years	Team	Pld	T	G	FG	P
1996	Counties Manukau	8	0	0	0	0
1997	Wigan Warriors	8	0	0	0	0
	Total	16	0	0	0	0
- Source: RLP rlfans.com
- Relatives: Aaron Lester (brother)

Stuart Lester (born 8 February 1975) is a New Zealand former professional rugby league footballer who played professionally for Wigan.

His brother, Aaron, played professionally for the Auckland Warriors and Whitehaven.

== Playing career ==
Lester made the Junior Kiwis in 1994 and was part of the side that defeated the Australian Schoolboys side for the first time.

In 1995 Lester was signed by the new Auckland Warriors franchise and played for the Warriors Colts in the Lion Red Cup. He was part of the side that lost the Grand Final that year. He remained with the Warriors in 1996, however he was limited to reserve grade appearances.

In August 1996 he was signed by the Wigan Warriors on a three-year contract, however due to a delay in a work permit he was not allowed to join the club until January 1997. Lester played eight games for the club during 1997's Super League II.
