= Odell Manuel =

New Zealand rugby league player and powerlifter

Personal information
- Born: 12 January 1978 (age 48) New Zealand

Playing information
- Height: 185 cm (6 ft 1 in)
- Weight: 99 kg (15 st 8 lb)
- Position: Wing
Club
| Years | Team | Pld | T | G | FG | P |
|---|---|---|---|---|---|---|
| 1999–00 | New Zealand Warriors | 39 | 13 | 0 | 0 | 52 |
| 2001–02 | Canberra Raiders | 19 | 6 | 0 | 0 | 24 |
| | Total | 58 | 19 | 0 | 0 | 76 |
Representative
| Years | Team | Pld | T | G | FG | P |
| 1997 | Junior Kiwis | 5 | 5 | 0 | 0 | 20 |
| 1998–08 | New Zealand Māori | 3 | 0 | 0 | 0 | 0 |

Odell Manuel is a New Zealand former professional rugby league footballer and the Australian Powerlifting champion.

== Early years ==
Growing up in Auckland, Manuel was an Otahuhu Leopards junior and in 1997 was selected for the Junior Kiwis.

== Rugby league career ==
Manuel played for the Warriors for two seasons, winning the Rookie of the Year award in 1999. In 2000 he represented the New Zealand Māori at the World Cup. He then spent two years at Canberra which were much less successful. Mid way through his first season he was injured in a collision with Lesley Vainikolo in training and he spent much of his second year in reserve grade.

He then returned to New Zealand to play for the Hibiscus Coast Raiders in the Bartercard Cup before a swansong season in Australia with the Central Comets. However, after only six games he was diagnosed with arthritis and forced to retire.

== Powerlifting career ==
In January 2009 Manuel entered his first powerlifting event. In March he won the Queensland title at the Queensland Open in Brisbane, lifting 892.5 kg, and in July 2009 he won the Australian national title by lifting 916 kg to break the Australian record by more than 20 kg and claim the overall title.

However Manuel tested positive to methylhexanamine at the Australian Powerlifting National Championships and was disqualified from the powerlifting events he competed in at the 2009 National Championships. He was banned for three months for the use of a banned substance, instead of the usual two-year suspension due to the Australian Sports Anti-Doping Authority (ASADA) being satisfied that he used the substance as part of a supplement and not to boost his performance in the sport.

November 2012 after time off with knee injury Manuel returned to competition mode in Melbourne's ProRaw powerlifting event posting a huge 932.5 kg raw total made up of a 350 kg (squat) 215 kg (bench) 367.5 kg (deadlift) @129 kg body weight. This event made him the first man in Australian history to go over 900 kg raw in his weight class.

In June 2013 Manuel made history again at the GPC Australia National Powerlifting titles. He squatted 390 kg, bench pressed 230 kg and deadlifted 400 kg at 137 kg body weight raw. This added up to a 1020 kg total, making him the first Australian to total over 1000 kg raw, across any powerlifting federation. In October 2018 Manual took part in Big Dogs 3 event where he took 2nd place with 1115 kg Total.
