= Joe Galuvao =

NZ & Samoa international rugby league footballer

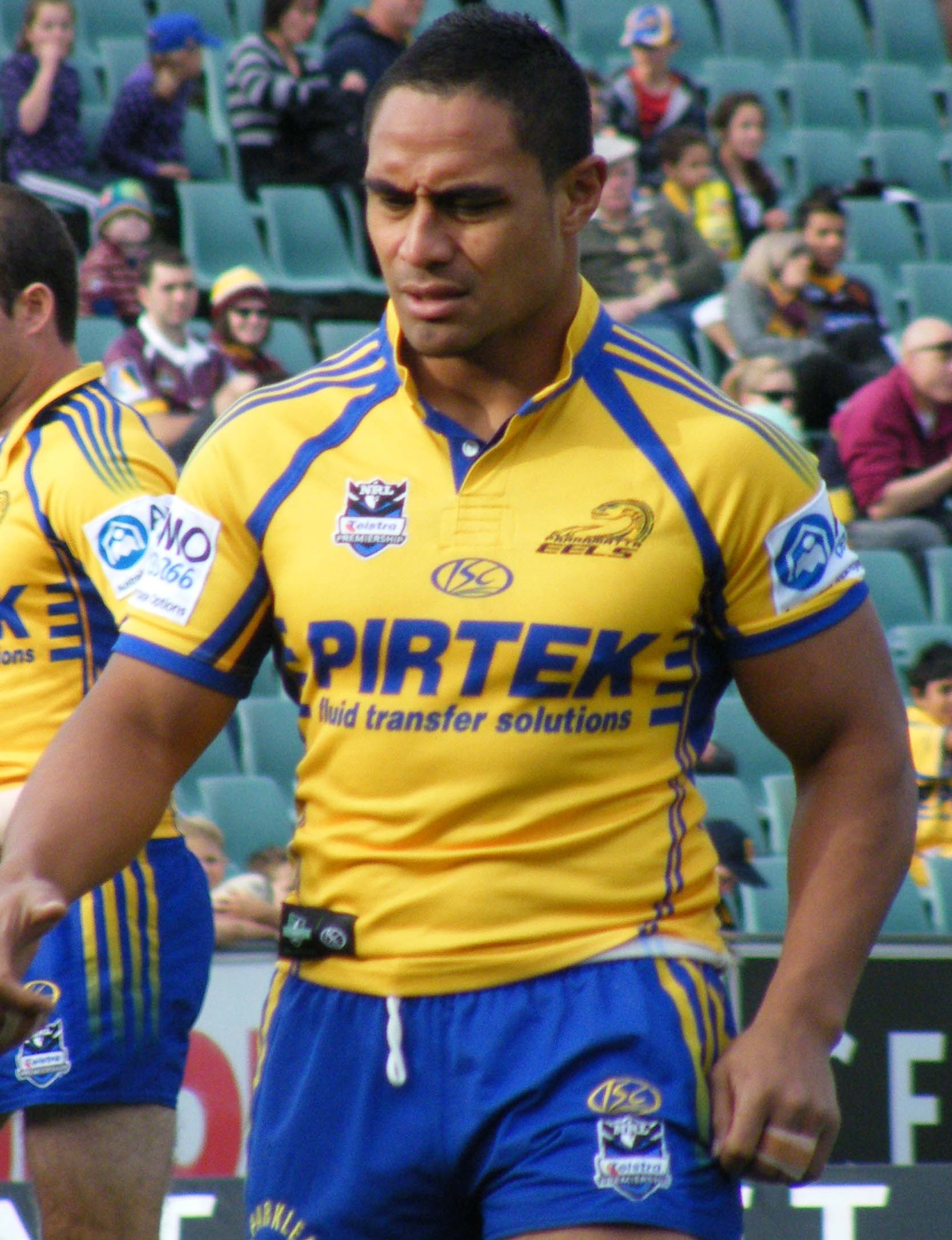

Personal information
- Full name: Joseph Frederick Galuvao
- Born: 8 July 1978 (age 48) Auckland, New Zealand

Playing information
- Height: 181 cm (5 ft 11 in)
- Weight: 106 kg (16 st 10 lb)
- Position: Second-row, Centre
Club
Years	Team	Pld	T	G	FG	P
1998–00	Auckland Warriors	27	4	0	0	16
2001–05	Penrith Panthers	78	15	0	0	60
2006–07	South Sydney	23	3	0	0	12
2008–09	Parramatta Eels	34	4	0	0	16
2010–13	Manly Sea Eagles	78	1	0	0	4
	Total	240	27	0	0	108
Representative
Years	Team	Pld	T	G	FG	P
2000	Samoa	2	0	0	0	0
2003–04	New Zealand	4	0	0	0	0

Joe Galuvao (born 8 July 1978) is a former professional rugby league footballer who played in the 1990s, 2000s, and 2010s in the NRL. A Samoa and New Zealand international second row forward, he played for the Auckland Warriors, Parramatta Eels, South Sydney Rabbitohs, Penrith Panthers (with whom he won the 2003 NRL Premiership) and Manly-Warringah Sea Eagles (with whom he won the 2011 NRL Premiership).

== Background ==
Galuvao was born in Auckland, New Zealand.

== Playing career ==
After starting his playing career in the late 1990s with the Auckland Warriors, Galuvao was a member of the 2003 NRL premiership-winning Panthers team which defeated the Sydney Roosters in the 2003 NRL grand final. With fellow second-rower Tony Puletua, Galuvao was known as one of the "Hair Bears" and was rated one of the best second-rowers in the world in 2003. As 2003 NRL premiers, the Panthers travelled to England to face Super League VIII champions, the Bradford Bulls in the 2004 World Club Challenge. Galuvao played as second-row forward in the Panthers' 22-4 loss.

Galuvao joined South Sydney from 2006 on a three-year deal. Galuvao was released in September 2007 after a campaign to encourage him to retire, reportedly being told by Souths to swap "the paddock for the pulpit". Galuvao signed a two-year contract with Parramatta, keeping him with the Eels through the 2009 NRL season.

In the 2008 NRL season, he only played in six NRL games for Parramatta. In 2009, however he matched that total in the first six games of the season. In August, 2009, Galuvao extended his playing career by signing a three-year deal with Manly-Warringah Sea Eagles. On October 4, 2009, Galuvao played for Parramatta in the 2009 NRL Grand Final defeat by Melbourne. In 2010, Melbourne were subsequently stripped of the premiership they won against Parramatta for major and deliberate breaches of the salary cap.

Despite being concussed in a pre-season match, Galuvao made his debut for Manly against his old club Parramatta in round 2 of the 2010 NRL season. Galuvao won a second premiership as part of Manly's victorious 2011 NRL Grand Final squad. He, along with Shane Rodney have played in the same premiership team twice, Rodney having been a teammate of Galuvao's in Penrith's victorious 2003 NRL Grand Final squad. In 2013, after suffering a season-ending injury, Galuvao announced his retirement.

== Career highlights ==
- First Grade Debut: 1998 – Round 8, Auckland v Sydney Roosters at Aussie Stadium, 2 May
- Representative Selection: 2003 – Australia vs New Zealand at Aussie Stadium, 25 July
- Premierships: 2003 – member of the Grand final winning Penrith Panthers, defeated Sydney Roosters, 18–6. Galuvao won a second premiership when Manly beat the New Zealand Warriors 24-10 in the 2011 NRL Grand Final
