= Grant Young (rugby league) =

New Zealand international rugby league footballer

Personal information
- Full name: Grant Edward Young
- Born: 30 July 1970 (age 54); Palmerston North, New Zealand

Playing information
- Height: 196 cm (6 ft 5 in)
- Weight: 112 kg (17 st 9 lb)
- Position: Prop
Club
Years	Team	Pld	T	G	FG	P
1995–96	South Qld Crushers	33	0	3	0	6
1997	Auckland Warriors	9	0	0	0	0
1998–99	London Broncos	32	4	0	0	8
	Total	74	4	3	0	14
Representative
Years	Team	Pld	T	G	FG	P
1996–97	New Zealand	6	1	0	0	4

Grant Edward Young is a New Zealand former professional rugby league footballer who played in the 1990s, as a prop.

== Playing career ==
Young grew up in Wanganui, shifting to Queensland when he was a teenager. He played for a local Sunshine Coast club, the Beerwah Bulldogs, and from here made the Australian Residents side in 1994. In 1995 he was signed by the new South Queensland Crushers and made his first grade début in their inaugural season. He made the New Zealand national rugby league team in 1996, playing in the series win over PNG and Great Britain.

In 1997, during the Super League war, Young aligned himself with Super League and signed with the Auckland Warriors. He played only nine games in the Super League competition that year, although he again earned national selection. Alongside fellow international Hitro Okesene Young was released by the Warriors at the end of the year.

Young moved to England in 1998, joining the London Broncos. In 1998 he played 22 games in the Super League competition. However just two games into the 1999 season he broke his leg and was sidelined for the rest of the season. He did not re-sign with the Broncos for 2000, being unhappy with the contract he was offered.

Instead Young returned home to Queensland and reunited with his junior club, the Beerwah Bulldogs, becoming the player-coach. In 2005 he moved to join the Ipswich Jets in the Queensland Cup competition. In 2008 he returned to Ipswich to participate in the International Legends of League match.
