= Bryan Henare =

New Zealand rugby league footballer

Personal information
- Born: 24 September 1974 (age 52) Auckland, New Zealand
- Height: 6 ft 4 in (192 cm)
- Weight: 14 st 7 lb (92 kg)

Playing information
- Position: Hooker, Second-row
Club
Years	Team	Pld	T	G	FG	P
1982	Otahuhu Leopards
1996–99	Auckland Warriors	22	3	0	0	12
2000–01	St Helens	20	1	0	0	4
2001–02	Oldham	44	14	0	0	56
2003	Leigh Centurions	18	2	0	0	8
2004	Featherstone Rovers	20	1	0	0	4
	Total	124	21	0	0	84
Representative
Years	Team	Pld	T	G	FG	P
1995	New Zealand Māori

Bryan Henare (born 24 September 1974 in Auckland, New Zealand) is a former professional rugby league footballer. Henare was usually a hooker or a second-rower.

== Playing career ==
=== Auckland Rugby League ===
An Otahuhu Leopards junior, Henare toured Great Britain in 1993 with the Junior Kiwis and he represented a New Zealand President's XIII in 1996. Henare also toured with the New Zealand Māori rugby league team in 1995. Henare played in the Lion Red Cup in 1995 for the Auckland Warriors colts side. Early on in his career Henare attracted interest from the Wigan Warriors but eventually opted to remain in Auckland.

=== National Rugby League ===
Henare played for the Auckland Warriors, making their first grade squad in 1996. He played in 22 games for the club, although a serious knee injury hampered his 1998 season. In 1999 Henare represented Auckland South in the National Provincial Competition.

=== Super League ===
Henare moved to England, signing with St. Helens at the start of the 2000 season. Having won the 1999 Championship, St. Helens contested in the 2000 World Club Challenge against National Rugby League Premiers the Melbourne Storm, with Henare playing at second-row forward in the loss. He was with the club for two years before moving to the Oldham Bears in 2002, initially on loan.

Henare then moved to the Leigh Centurions at the start of 2003.
