= Paul Staladi =

NZ rugby league footballer

Personal information
- Born: 29 March 1975 (age 51) Auckland, New Zealand
- Height: 170 cm (5 ft 7 in)
- Weight: 80 kg (12 st 8 lb)

Playing information
- Position: Wing
Club
Years	Team	Pld	T	G	FG	P
19??	Mt Albert Lions
1997–98	Auckland Warriors	15	3	0	0	12
	Total	15	3	0	0	12

Paul Staladi (born 29 March 1975) is a New Zealand former rugby league footballer. His position of preference was on the Wing.

== Early career ==
A Mt Albert Lions junior in the Auckland competition, Staladi was signed by the new Auckland Warriors franchise. He stood out playing for the Warriors Colts team in the 1995 Lion Red Cup, although he did not make the first grade side until 1997. He played four first grade games for the Warriors in the 1997 Super League season. In 1998 he played eleven games for the Warriors in the new National Rugby League competition.

== Later career ==
Staladi originally signed for the Warrington Wolves for the 1999 Super League season. However, because he had only played eleven games for the Warriors this was not enough to secure a work permit and he could not join the Warrington squad. Staladi then signed for the South Sydney Rabbitohs for the 2000 season, only for them to be excluded from the National Rugby League. After contemplating giving the game away Staladi returned to the Mt Albert Lions who entered the new Bartercard Cup competition in 2000.

== Rugby Union ==
Later he played rugby union, representing Northland in New Zealand's National Provincial Championship.
