= Steve Buckingham (rugby league) =

New Zealand rugby league footballer and coach

Personal information
- Born: New Zealand

Playing information
- Position: Halfback, Five-eighth
Club
Years	Team	Pld	T	G	FG	P
1997	Auckland Warriors	2	0	0	0	0

Steve Buckingham is a New Zealand rugby league coach and former rugby league footballer. His position of preference was at Halfback. He is currently the head coach of the Mount Albert Lions.

== Early years ==
Buckingham started his career playing for the Glenora Bears. Here he won his first two Fox Memorial titles. A longtime Warriors scholarship player, who playing in the 1995 Lion Red Cup Grand Final loss, he played two Super League first grade games under coach John Monie in early 1997. However Monie was fired halfway through the season and Buckingham did not play for the Warriors again.

== Bartercard Cup ==
In the late 1990s Buckingham left Glenora after a dispute over match payments. He then joined the Mt Albert Lions, a club he was to enjoy great success with. In the seven years of the national Bartercard Cup competition Buckingham played in four Cup-winning sides, winning with Mt Albert three times and once with the Auckland Lions. He also captained the 2004 winning side.

During this time he played for several National Residents selections, including the 2003 New Zealand 'A' tour of Great Britain and captaining New Zealand 'A' in 2004.

== Later years ==
With the launch of the Auckland Lions in the NSWRL Premier League competition in 2007 Buckingham once again became involved in a Trans-Tasman competition.

In 2008 he returned to playing in the local Auckland competition and was a part of Mt Albert's Fox Memorial winning side. He also received the club's best half award. Buckingham continued to play for Mt Albert in 2009 and came out of retirement as player-coach in 2011.

== Coaching career ==
While still playing in 2009 Buckingham served as an assistant coach under Brett Gemmell. In 2010 Buckingham became the Lions head coach when Gemmell was appointed the coach of the Auckland Vulcans. In 2013, 2014 and 2015 he coached the Akarana Falcons in the National Competition.
