= Jerry Seuseu =

New Zealand and Samoa international rugby league footballer

Personal information
- Born: 19 April 1974 (age 52) Auckland, New Zealand

Playing information
- Height: 188 cm (6 ft 2 in)
- Weight: 108 kg (17 st 0 lb)
- Position: Prop
Club
Years	Team	Pld	T	G	FG	P
1995–96	Counties Manukau	37	6	0	0	20
1997–04	New Zealand Warriors	132	10	0	0	40
2005–06	Wigan Warriors	40	1	0	0	4
	Total	209	17	0	0	64
Representative
Years	Team	Pld	T	G	FG	P
2000	Samoa	4	0	0	0	0
2001–04	New Zealand	11	1	0	0	4
- Relatives: Anthony Seu Seu (brother)

Jerry Seuseu (born 19 April 1974) is a former professional rugby league footballer who played in the 1990s and 2000s as a prop. He represented New Zealand and Samoa at international level. After retirement he became Wellbeing and Education manager at the New Zealand Warriors and the manager for the Junior Warriors. He is the current Junior Kiwis Manager as well as the Senior Wellbeing Manager for the New Zealand Warriors

== Playing career ==
A Mangere East Hawks junior, Seuseu represented the Counties Manukau Heroes in the Lion Red Cup in 1995 and 1996, where he was Lion Red Cup player of the year in 1996 before joining the Auckland Warriors where he was named Reserve Grader of the Year in 1997. Seuseu then became a stalwart in the Auckland Warriors front row after Joe Vagana left the club to join Bradford Bulls in 2000. Seuseu played for Samoa at the 2000 World Cup. Seuseu played for the New Zealand Warriors at prop forward in their 2002 NRL Grand Final loss against the Sydney Roosters. He went on to make over 120 appearances for the New Zealand Warriors, scoring 8 tries.

In 2004 he was banned for seven matches after pleading guilty to reckless high tackling.

Seuseu joined English club Wigan Warriors at the start of the 2005 Super League season. His younger brother, Anthony Seuseu, also played in Super League VIII with strugglers Halifax. Seuseu retired from rugby league at the end of the 2006 Super League season after two years playing for Wigan Warriors.

== Post playing ==
Between 2007 and 2009 he worked as a Football Development Officer for the Auckland Rugby League focusing on grassroots juniors. He then took up a similar position at the New Zealand Warriors, becoming the Welfare and Education manager for the 2010 season.

In 2023, Seuseu participated in season 3 of Match Fit, where former rugby players return to play against the Australian counterparts. He joined in the first season that featured former rugby league stars. He also revealed that he had undergone hip replacement in the last year. On episode 5, he revealed the true reason that he entered his current job was mostly due to losing his father when Jerry was just six-years-old.
