= Tony Tatupu =

New Zealand & Samoa international rugby league footballer

Personal information
- Full name: Kuripitone Tatupu
- Born: 26 July 1969 (age 57) New Zealand

Playing information
- Height: 190 cm (6 ft 3 in)
- Weight: 98 kg (15 st 6 lb)
- Position: Centre, Second-row
Club
Years	Team	Pld	T	G	FG	P
	Mt Albert Lions
1994	North Harbour	23	9	0	0	26
1995–96	Auckland Warriors	27	6	0	0	24
1997	Warrington Wolves	26	7	0	0	28
1998–99	Auckland Warriors	40	4	0	0	16
2000–01	Wakefield Trinity Wildcats	25	3	0	0	12
	Total	141	29	0	0	106
Representative
Years	Team	Pld	T	G	FG	P
1991–94	Auckland	12
1990–00	Western Samoa	6	2	0	0	8
1994–95	New Zealand	4	0	0	0	0
- Relatives: Matthew Wright (nephew)

Kuripitone "Tony" Tatupu is a former professional rugby league footballer. He played as a centre and in the second-row and represented both New Zealand and Western Samoa. Tatupu is the uncle of the rugby league footballer; Matthew Wright.

== Playing career ==
Tatupu first played for the Mt Albert Lions in the Auckland competition before joining the North Harbour Sea Eagles for the 1994 Lion Red Cup season. Between 1991 and 1993 he played 12 games for Auckland. From there he joined the Auckland Warriors for their inaugural season in the Australian Rugby League competition. Along with Nigel Vagana he joined the Warrington Wolves in the Super League competition in 1997 before returning to the Warriors for another two seasons.

In 2000 he returned to England to finish his career at the Wakefield Trinity Wildcats. He stayed with the club during a time of financial turbulence mid-way through the 2000 season which saw all players aged over 24 released and then re-signed on limited wages.

== Representative career ==
Tatupu represented the Kiwis tour of PNG 1994 in 4 tour matches + was capped with 4 Official test matches - Samoa at two World Cups, and two Pacific Cups. He was named in the 1992 Pacific Cups team of the tournament.

== Later years ==
He now serves as a New Zealand Police officer and represented the New Zealand Police at the inaugural Police World Cup.

Tatupu's son Shem spent some time with Australian Football League (AFL) club Hawthorn as an international rookie.
