= Sean Hoppe =

NZ international rugby league footballer

Personal information
- Full name: Sean Edward Hoppe
- Born: 19 January 1971 (age 55) Auckland, New Zealand

Playing information
- Height: 185 cm (6 ft 1 in)
- Weight: 95 kg (14 st 13 lb)
- Position: Wing, Centre
Club
Years	Team	Pld	T	G	FG	P
1988	Northcote Tigers
1992–93	Canberra Raiders	39	22	0	0	88
1994	North Sydney Bears	25	15	0	0	60
1995–99	Auckland Warriors	88	44	0	0	176
1999–02	St Helens	98	36	0	0	144
	Total	250	117	0	0	468
Representative
Years	Team	Pld	T	G	FG	P
	Auckland
1990–00	New Zealand Māori	4	3
1992–02	New Zealand	35	17	0	0	68
1997	New Zealand (TS)	2	0	0	0	0

Sean "Shoppe" Edward Hoppe (born 19 January 1971) is a New Zealand former professional rugby league footballer who represented New Zealand.

== Early years ==
As a junior, he played for the Glen Innes Falcons, a feeder club to Ellerslie during the 1980s.

Hoppe then joined the Northcote Tigers and played for them in the Auckland Rugby League competition. In 1989 he was part of the Tigers Fox Memorial and Lion Red National Knockout title winning side. He was a part of several other Northcote winning teams during these years and scored two tries in the 1991 Lion Red League final. In 1992 he played for Auckland in a preseason match against the Canberra Raiders. Auckland lost 14–32, but the Raiders, who had been looking for a quality winger since the retirement of John Ferguson, saw enough of Hoppe to offer him a contract and he moved to Canberra before the end of the year.

== Playing career ==
=== 1990s ===
Hoppe played 17 games in his first season and won the Raiders' 1992 Rookie of the year award. Hoppe was the New Zealand Player of the Year in 1993. However at the end of the 1993 season it was announced that Hoppe had signed for the new Auckland Warriors side who were to enter the competition in 1995. Canberra Raiders were unwilling to sign Hoppe for just one more year and so he joined the North Sydney Bears for the 1994 season and thus missed the Canberra Raiders 1994 Grand Final win over Canterbury-Bankstown (North Sydney lost the Grand Final qualifier to the Canberra Raiders). He was part of the Auckland Warriors inaugural side in 1995 and became a regular first team player. He was voted the competition's best winger in 1995 and his 19 tries in the 1995 season remained a club record until 2003 (when it was surpassed by Francis Meli). He is currently fourth on the club's all-time try scoring list with 44.

Signed for a five-year contract, he was released by the Auckland Warriors near the end of the 1999 season so he could join St. Helens in the Super League competition. Hoppe joined St. Helens on a short-term deal but then signed a two-year deal with the club. Hoppe played for St. Helens from the interchange bench in their 1999 Super League Grand Final victory over Bradford Bulls.

=== 2000s ===
Having won the 1999 Championship, St. Helens contested in the 2000 World Club Challenge against National Rugby League Premiers the Melbourne Storm, with Hoppe playing at centre and scoring a try in the loss. He played for St Helens at centre, scoring a try in their 2000 Super League Grand Final victory over Wigan Warriors. As Super League V champions, St. Helens played against 2000 NRL Premiers, the Brisbane Broncos in the 2001 World Club Challenge. Hoppe played on the wing in Saints' victory. His contract was later extended for another year and he retired at the end of the 2002 season. Hoppe played for St. Helens from the interchange bench in their 2002 Super League Grand Final victory against the Bradford Bulls. His last two matches in 2002 were a Test match against France for the New Zealand national rugby league team followed up by playing against the Kiwis for his club side, St Helens. Hoppe captained St. Helens in his last match.

== Later years ==
After retirement Hoppe moved to Bundaberg and is a referee in the Bundaberg Rugby League competition as well as serving as an assistant coach for their representative team. Sean is currently working as part of Bullgang in the WestConnex M4-M5 Link Tunnels

His daughter Kaitlyn Hoppe starred in Season 8 of The Bachelor Australia and came 5th.

https://m.imdb.com/name/nm7031353/

== Representative career ==
Hoppe was a Junior Kiwi in 1989 and played for the New Zealand Māori rugby league team from 1990.

Hoppe played in 35 test matches for New Zealand between 1992 and 2002, including the 1995 World Cup. His test career originally ended in 1999 however in 2002 he was called up into the squad touring Europe as an injury replacement and played in the final test against Great Britain and the one-off test against France. In these matches he played for the Kiwis in the Centres, rather than his usual Wing position.

Hoppe also represented New Zealand in the Super League Tri-series in 1997 and played for Aotearoa Māori at the 2000 World Cup.
