= Logan Swann =

New Zealand international rugby league footballer

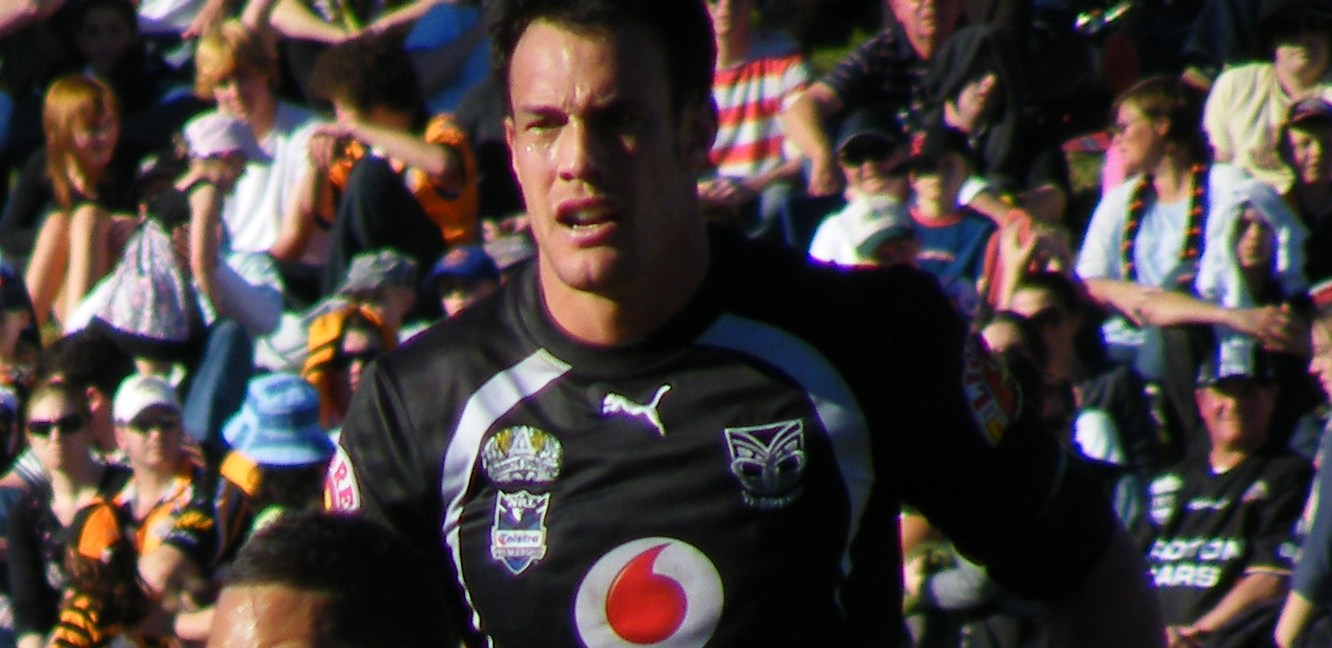

Personal information
- Full name: Logan Douglas Swann
- Born: 10 February 1975 (age 51) Auckland, New Zealand

Playing information
- Height: 193 cm (6 ft 4 in)
- Weight: 104 kg (16 st 5 lb)
- Position: Second-row, Lock
Club
Years	Team	Pld	T	G	FG	P
1997–03	New Zealand Warriors	146	34	1	0	138
2004	Bradford Bulls	26	6	0	0	24
2005–06	Warrington Wolves	52	20	0	0	80
2007–08	New Zealand Warriors	49	2	0	0	8
	Total	273	62	1	0	250
Representative
Years	Team	Pld	T	G	FG	P
1996–04	New Zealand	29	5	0	0	20
2008	All Golds	1	0	1	0	2
- Relatives: Anthony Swann (cousin); Willie Swann (cousin)

Logan Swann (born 10 February 1975) is a New Zealand former professional rugby league footballer who represented New Zealand. Swann is related to several other international rugby league players, notably cousins Willie Swann and Anthony Swann.

== Early years ==
Swann was born in Auckland, New Zealand, on 10 February 1975. He was educated at Sacred Heart College, Auckland. He started his junior career in New Zealand with the Mt Wellington club, then moved to the Ōtāhuhu club, completing his amateur league years with the Ellerslie Eagles.

== Playing career ==
=== National Rugby League ===
Swann joined the Auckland Warriors Colts side in 1995 and later went on to play in the Reserves team in 1996. At the end of the 1996 season Swann had impressed the Reserve grade coach Frank Endacott so much that he was picked for the New Zealand national rugby league team squad. Swann was picked for the New Zealand national rugby league team in 1996 straight from the Reserve Grade of the Auckland Warriors. His test début was against the Great Britain team. Swann went on to play for New Zealand twenty nine times over nine years from 1996–2004. Swann made his first grade début in 1997. In 1998 he represented Samoa in the Super League World Nines, and played in the final. Swann was selected for the New Zealand team to compete in the end of season 1999 Rugby League Tri-Nations tournament. In the final against Australia he played as a loose forward in the Kiwis' 22–20 loss.

Swann played for New Zealand in the 2000 Rugby League World Cup. He stayed with the Warriors for seven seasons, winning the Minor Premiership in 2002. He played from the interchange bench in the 2002 NRL grand final which the Warriors lost to the Sydney Roosters.

In May 2003, Swann and two associates assaulted a man on Queen Street, Auckland. The victim was left with a swollen eye and facial grazes. In December 2004, Swann appeared before Judge Avinash Deobhakta for sentencing after earlier pleading guilty to common assault. Saying that he was "very, very reluctantly" granting him a discharge without conviction, Judge Deobhakta ordered Swann to pay the victim $500. "People have the wrong impression that guys like you with celebrity status can get away with bad behaviour under the influence of high intoxicants, just because you are sporting celebrities," he said, before noting that it was "glowing testimonies", a desire not to ruin Swann's career and no previous convictions that had tipped the balance in Swann's favour.

=== Super League ===
In 2004 Swann moved to England, joining the Bradford Bulls. Having won Super League VIII, Bradford played against 2003 NRL Premiers, the Penrith Panthers in the 2004 World Club Challenge. Swann played as a loose forward and scored a try in the Bulls' 22–4 victory. He played for Bradford at second-row in their 2004 Super League Grand Final loss against the Leeds Rhinos. In 2005 he joined the Warrington Wolves where he spent two seasons.

=== Return to the NRL ===
Swann returned home to play for the New Zealand Warriors in the 2007 and 2008 seasons. This means that Swann has been involved in five of the seven playoff campaigns for the New Zealand Warriors up to end of the 2008 year; 2001, 2002, 2003, 2007 and 2008. On 8 April 2007 Swann became the third player to play 150 first grade games for the Warriors. In 2008 he played for the All Golds in their match against the New Zealand Māori that served as a buildup game to the 2008 World Cup.

== Post playing ==
After retiring at the end of 2008 Swann became a real estate salesperson. He currently works for Ray White New Zealand in the suburb of Remuera.

In November 2020 he was named one of the best dressed men on David Hartnell MNZM's Best Dressed List.
