= Anthony Swann =

NZ & Samoa international rugby league footballer

Personal information
- Full name: Anthony Gilbert Swann
- Born: 27 March 1975 (age 51) Auckland, New Zealand

Playing information
- Position: Centre
Club
Years	Team	Pld	T	G	FG	P
1994	Waitakere City	6	0	0	0	0
1996–98	Auckland Warriors	36	6	0	0	24
1999	North Sydney Bears	8	1	0	0	4
2000–01	Canberra Raiders	19	6	0	0	24
2001	Warrington Wolves	3	1	0	0	4
	Total	72	14	0	0	56
Representative
Years	Team	Pld	T	G	FG	P
1996	New Zealand	3	0	0	0	0
2000	Samoa	4	0	0	0	0
- Relatives: Willie Swann (brother); Logan Swann (cousin)

Anthony Gilbert Swann (born 27 March 1975) is a former professional rugby league footballer who represented both New Zealand and Samoa in international rugby league.

== Background ==
He was educated at Liston College, Henderson.

== Playing career ==
Swann's career started with the Waitakere City Raiders in the 1994 Lion Red Cup, before he signed with the Auckland Warriors, joining their reserve grade side. He made the Warriors' first grade side in 1996 and played 36 times for the club. He was a New Zealand representative in 1996, playing in three test matches.

After this Swann spent a year with the North Sydney Bears where he was in the lineup for North Sydney's last ever first grade game against The North Queensland Cowboys in Townsville scoring a try.

He spent a season and a half with the Canberra Raiders before moving to England to join the Warrington Wolves. Swann played for Samoa at the 2000 World Cup.

In 2002 he switched to rugby union, and played for the Bay of Plenty Steamers.

In 2004 Swann returned to Auckland, playing rugby league for the Mt Albert Lions in the Bartercard Cup, and representative football for the Auckland side.

== Later years ==
After retiring from rugby Swann became a teacher at Glen Eden Intermediate School.

== Personal life ==
His brother, Willie, and his cousin, Logan Swann, both played for the Auckland Warriors.
