= Stephen Kearney =

New Zealand rugby league player and coach

Stephen Kearney ONZM
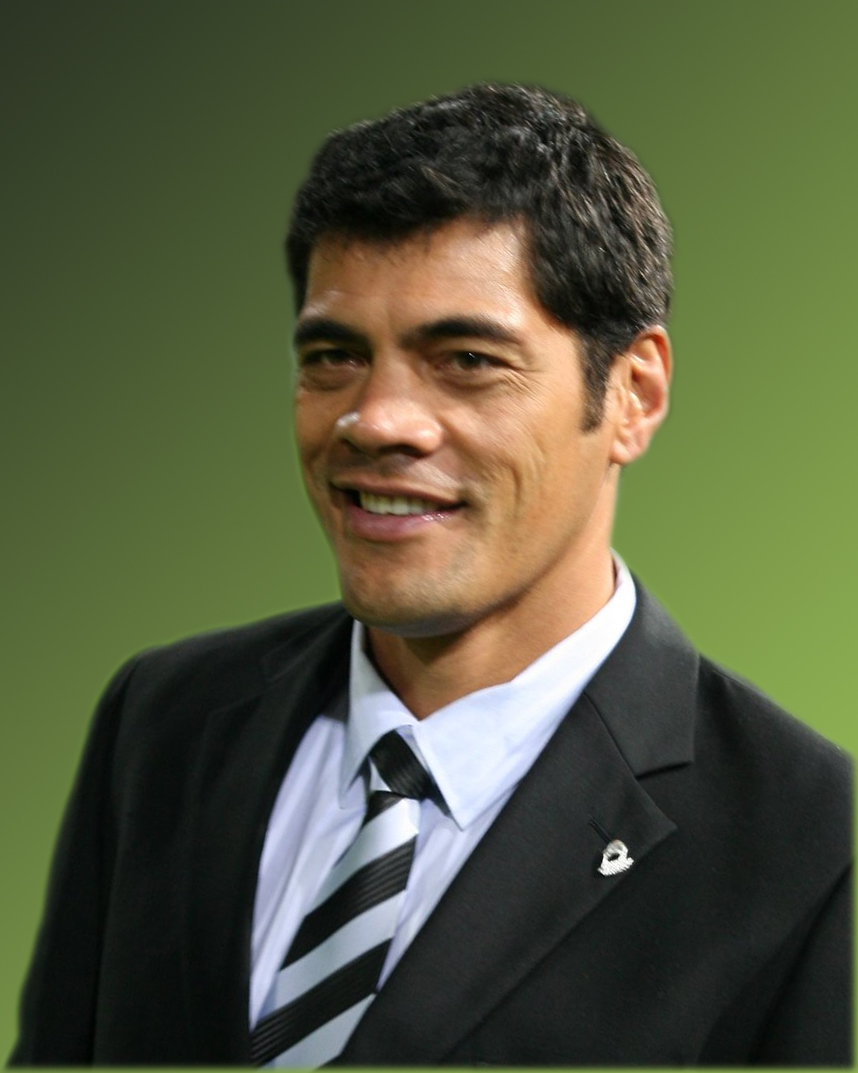

Personal information
- Full name: Stephen Peter Kearney
- Born: 11 June 1972 (age 54) Paraparaumu, New Zealand
- Height: 191 cm (6 ft 3 in)
- Weight: 103 kg (16 st 3 lb)

Playing information
- Position: Second-row
Club
Years	Team	Pld	T	G	FG	P
1991	Randwick Kingfishers
1992–94	Western Suburbs	46	6	0	0	24
1995–98	Auckland Warriors	79	11	0	0	44
1999–04	Melbourne Storm	139	20	0	0	80
2005	Hull F.C.	24	5	0	0	20
	Total	288	42	0	0	168
Representative
Years	Team	Pld	T	G	FG	P
1991	Wellington	7	0	0	0	0
1993–04	New Zealand	45	9	0	0	36

Coaching information
Club
Years	Team	Gms	W	D	L	W%
2011–12	Parramatta Eels	42	10	1	31	24
2017–20	New Zealand Warriors	79	32	1	46	41
	Total	121	42	2	77	35
Representative
Years	Team	Gms	W	D	L	W%
2008–16	New Zealand	42	23	1	18	55
- Source: As of 21 September 2019

Stephen Peter Kearney ONZM (born 11 June 1972) is a New Zealand professional rugby league football coach who until 2020 was the head coach of the New Zealand Warriors in the NRL and a former player.

A New Zealand national captain and second-row forward, Kearney's club football career, which spanned from the early 1990s to the mid-2000s, was played for the Randwick Kingfishers, Western Suburbs Magpies, Auckland Warriors, Melbourne Storm (with whom he won the 1999 NRL Premiership), and Hull F.C. (with whom he won the 2005 Challenge Cup).

Kearney was previously the head coach of the New Zealand national team, with whom he won the 2008 World Cup and 2011 Four Nations tournaments. He also previously coached the Parramatta Eels in the National Rugby League.

== Background ==
Kearney was born in Paraparaumu, New Zealand.

== Playing career ==
A Kapiti Bears junior, Kearney played for the Junior Kiwis between 1989 and 1991, becoming the side's captain for the 1991 series against Great Britain. He made his senior début in 1991 for the Randwick Kingfishers and also played for Wellington that year. Randwick lost the Wellington Rugby League Grand Final 6–14 to the Wainuiomata Lions.

Turning professional he moved to Australia to play for the Western Suburbs Magpies in 1992 in what is now the NSWRL Premiership. In 1993 he became the New Zealand national rugby league team' youngest test captain, aged 21. He left the Magpies at the end of 1994, returning home to play for the Auckland Warriors in their inaugural season. At the end of that season he travelled to England to represent New Zealand in the 1995 World Cup. He missed the first test match against a re-unified Australian team in 1998 due to suspension. Kearney remained a Warrior until 1998, when he moved to Australia to join the Melbourne Storm. In the Melbourne club's second ever season Kearney played at second-row forward in their victory in the 1999 NRL Grand Final. Kearney was selected for the New Zealand team to compete in the end of season 1999 Rugby League Tri-Nations tournament. In the final against Australia he played at second-row forward in the Kiwis' 22–20 loss.

Having won the 1999 Premiership, the Melbourne Storm travelled to England to contest the 2000 World Club Challenge against Super League Champions St Helens R.F.C., with Kearney playing at second-row forward in the victory. In 2002 Kearney missed the series-deciding match against Great Britain as he had to rush back home to Melbourne to be with his sick five-year-old daughter, who needed emergency surgery. While captaining the Storm in 2004, Kearney became the first New Zealand footballer to play 250 Australian first-grade matches. He also played his last test match for the Kiwis in 2004, in a game that marked the début of Sonny Bill Williams. Kearney finished his playing career with English club Hull F.C. in the Super League competition, playing in their 2005 Challenge Cup-winning side.

== Coaching career ==
In 2006 Kearney retired from playing and returned to Australia to take up a role as assistant coach at his old club, the Melbourne Storm, under Craig Bellamy. In 2008 Kearney was appointed as the New Zealand national rugby league team head coach on a two-year contract.

Kearney (with assistant Wayne Bennett) coached the Kiwis to their first World Cup win. On 22 November 2008, they defeated Australia 34–20 in the final, at Suncorp Stadium in Brisbane. Following this achievement, he was appointed an Officer of the New Zealand Order of Merit, for services to rugby league, in the 2009 Queen's Birthday Honours.

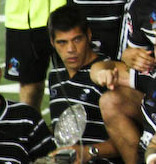
Kearney in 2008

For the 2010 Anzac Test, Kearney coached New Zealand in their loss against Australia. In the 2010 post-season Kearney was announced as Daniel Anderson's replacement as head coach of the Parramatta Eels for three years beginning in 2011. Shortly after that, he took the Kiwis to victory in the 2010 Four Nations Final against Australia.

In 2011 he failed to coach the Parramatta NRL team to any success, with the Eels achieving just six wins and one draw in 24 matches, and only just missing out on the wooden spoon when they beat the Gold Coast Titans in the last game of the regular season.

Things didn't get any better for Kearney in the 2012 NRL season. With the Eels struggling in last place on the NRL ladder after 16 rounds, Melbourne Storm's inaugural coach, and two time premiership winning coach Chris Anderson was appointed as a mentor to Kearney to help him turn the club's fortunes around. However this did not eventuate and Kearney was forced to resign only three rounds later on 20 July, after achieving only 3 wins from 19 matches in the season. He left the Eels with just 10 wins from 42 matches, a very poor winning percentage of 24 percent.

In October 2012 Kearney signed a two-year contract as Brisbane Broncos assistant coach from 2013.

Kearney coached the holders, New Zealand in the 2013 World Cup where they were beaten in the final by Australia.

In November 2014, he guided New Zealand to their second Four Nations championship, defeating Australia 22–18 in the final.

In March 2015, he signed a new deal to remain as coach of the Kiwis until the conclusion of the 2017 Rugby League World Cup.

At the end of 2015, his 23 test wins as coach and five wins over Australia is the most out of any that has coached New Zealand in the past, in stark contrast to his record as an NRL head coach.

On 12 September 2016, Kearney stepped down from his role as coach of New Zealand after accepting a return to head coaching in the NRL as coach of the New Zealand Warriors on a three-year deal. He replaced Andrew McFadden who remained at the Warriors as his assistant.

In his first season coaching the Warriors, 2017, the team finished 13th on the table, after managing only 7 wins from their 24 games, a win percentage of 29%.

In 2018, however, Kearney's season started brightly, with the club winning their first 5 matches of the season, for the first time in the club's history. Slipping slowly down the ladder through the season, from starting right at the top, they finally secured eighth spot, with 15 wins out of 24, a 62% win percentage. They then crashed out of their first finals match since 2011 with a 27–12 loss to the Penrith Panthers at ANZ Stadium in Sydney.

At the halfway point of the 2019 season, Kearney's Warriors had four wins from 12 starts, a 33% win percentage.

He signed a contract to extend his time as head coach of the Warriors until 2022 at the end of February 2019.

On 20 June 2020, he was sacked by the New Zealand Warriors, due to poor results, and was replaced by his assistant coach Todd Payten.

Kearney returned to the Melbourne Storm for the 2021 NRL season, signing a one-year deal as an assistant coach.

In September 2021 his contract was extended for a further two years.

=== Kiwis coaching record ===
Opponent	Played	Won	Drew	Lost	Win ratio (%)
Australia	20	5	1	14	25.00
England	10	6	0	4	60.00
Papua New Guinea	3	3	0	0	100
Tonga	2	2	0	0	100
France	2	2	0	0	100
Samoa	3	3	0	0	100
Wales	1	1	0	0	100
Scotland	1	1	0	0	100
TOTAL	42	23	1	18	54.76

== Legacy ==
In 2007 Kearney was named in the Melbourne Storm team of the decade.

In 2012 he was named as one of the New Zealand Rugby League's Legends of League. Born in Wellington, he was also named in the Wellington Rugby League's Team of the Century.

As part of their 20-year celebrations in 2018, Melbourne Storm named Kearney part of their team of the Melbourne Storm Team for the first 20 years.
