= Syd Eru =

NZ international rugby league footballer

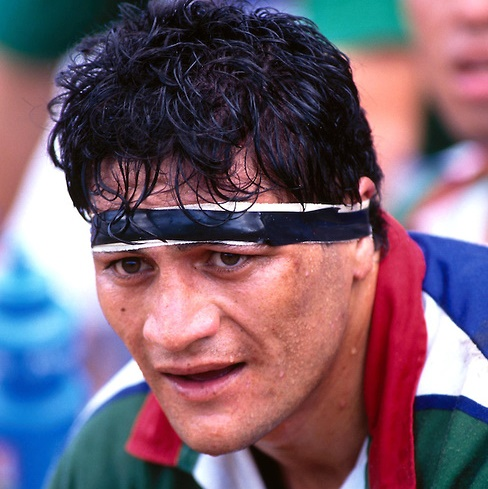

Personal information
- Full name: Sydney Wiremu Eru
- Born: 26 July 1971 (age 55) Rotorua, New Zealand

Playing information
- Height: 175 cm (5 ft 9 in)
- Weight: 90 kg (14 st 2 lb)
- Position: Hooker
Club
Years	Team	Pld	T	G	FG	P
19?? (WRL)	Upper Hutt Tigers
1995–99	Auckland Warriors	59	15	0	0	60
	Total	59	15	0	0	60
Representative
Years	Team	Pld	T	G	FG	P
1990–93	Wellington	10
1992–93	New Zealand Māori
1995–98	New Zealand	18	4	0	0	16

Sydney Wiremu "Syd" Eru (born 26 July 1971) is a New Zealand former professional rugby league footballer who played the 1990s. A Kiwi representative hooker, he played club football for the Auckland Warriors.

== Background ==
Eru was born in Rotorua, New Zealand.

== Playing career ==
Eru played for the Upper Hutt Tigers in the Wellington Rugby League and Rockingham and Perth in Australia. In 1993 he was part of Upper Hutt's premiership winning team and played for Wellington in their 27–22 victory over Auckland. He was then invited to be part of an Auckland Invitational XIII side that drew 16-all with the Balmain Tigers.

He was signed by the Auckland Warriors for their debut season in the Australian Rugby League competition in 1995 as the backup hooker. However, by the end of the season he had replaced Duane Mann, the New Zealand national rugby league team captain, as both the Auckland Warriors and the New Zealand hooker. He was subsequently rewarded with an improved contract. In 1998 he was targeted by a Welsh rugby league franchise, but the club - and the offer - did not eventuate.

His career was frequently marred by injury, Eru played 59 games over five seasons for the Warriors. Eru remained with the Warriors until the end of the 1999 season, retiring to Western Australia. His retirement was forced due to a serious wrist-injury.

== Representative career ==
Eru first came to national attention in 1990 when he played for the Junior Kiwis and made his debut for Wellington. In 1991 he played for the Kiwi Colts side who defeated France 28–8.

Eru represented the New Zealand Māori in 1992 and 1993, debuting at the 1992 Pacific Cup. He was a Kiwi trialist in 1993, but missed selection for the 1993 tour of Great Britain and France.

Eru made his New Zealand national rugby league team debut in 1995 and was selected to represent New Zealand at the 1995 Rugby League World Cup. At the tournament Eru tested positive for ephedrine. He played in twenty tests for New Zealand between 1995 and 1998, including stand out performances in victories over Great Britain in 1996 and Australia in 1997.
