= 2002 New Zealand rugby league season =

Seasons
- 2001 2003

The 2002 New Zealand rugby league season was the 95th season of rugby league that had been played in New Zealand. The main feature of the year was the third season of the Bartercard Cup competition that was run by the New Zealand Rugby League. The Mt Albert Lions won the Cup by defeating the Hibiscus Coast Raiders 24–20 in the Grand Final.

== International competitions ==
The New Zealand national rugby league team played Australia at Wellington's Westpac Stadium in October and lost 24-32 before embarking on a five match tour of Great Britain and France. Coached by Gary Freeman the squad included: Monty Betham, Jason Cayless, Henry Fa'afili, Awen Guttenbeil, Lance Hohaia, Sean Hoppe, captain Stacey Jones, Stephen Kearney, Ali Lauitiiti, Andrew Lomu, Francis Meli, Robbie Paul, Tony Puletua, Paul Rauhihi, Jerry Seuseu, Michael Smith, David Solomona, Richard Swain, Logan Swann, Motu Tony, Clinton Toopi, Matt Utai, David Vaealiki, Nigel Vagana and Ruben Wiki.

The New Zealand Māori rugby league team hosted Tonga at Rotorua International Stadium on 5 October, defeating them 50–6. The team was coached by Bernie Perenara and included Chris Nahi, Aaron Heremaia and Jamie Cook. The Tongan side had earlier defeated Auckland Māori 36-24 and the Waicoa Bay Stallions 38–30. The Waicoa Bay side was coached by Tawera Nikau and included Andrew Leota.

New Zealand A toured France and the United States. They won matches against France A, France Juniors and the United States but lost 16–19 to France. The team was coached by Gary Kemble with Aaron Whittaker serving as trainer. The squad was Gavin Bailey, Wayne Barnett, Steve Buckingham, George Carmont, David Fa'alogo, Chris Faifua, Lee Finnerty, Daniel Floyd, Karl Guttenbeil, Eddie Hei Hei, Ricky Henry, Archie Ikihele, Tevita Latu, Phillip Leuluai, Jonny Limmer, captain Ben Lythe, Hutch Maiava, Fuifui Moimoi, Tyrone Pau, George Tuakura and Regan Wigg.

Twenty six games were played between various New Zealand youth teams and equivalent Australian teams, with New Zealand winning twenty of them. Richard Bolton was the National Development Manager. Notable matches included the under-18 Junior Kiwis defeating the Wests Tigers elite training squad 34-26 and the Australian Institute of Sport side 58–10. The Junior Kiwis were coached by James Leuluai, managed by Kevin Fisher and included Vince Mellars, Karl Johnson, Zebastian Lucky Luisi, Toshio Laiseni, Danny Bernard, Jerome Ropati, Thomas Leuluai, Evarn Tuimavave, Epalahame Lauaki, Kane Ferris, Roger Eliu, Louie Anderson, William Raston, Jason McDougall, Herewini Rangi, Andrew Auimatagi, Manu Vatuvei, Shaun Metcalf, Izraal Lo-Tam and Aoterangi Herangi. Shaun Metcalf, Iosia Soliola, Rangi Chase, Samuela Moa, Frank Paul Nuuausala, Eliakim Uasi, Adam Blair, Dion Te Ahu and William Heta were included in the under-16 New Zealand side.

== National competitions ==
=== Rugby League Cup ===
Otago defeated Tasman 42–28 to win the Rugby League Cup on 8 September. Otago then defeated Canterbury "A" 52-34 and Southland 20–16.

=== Bartercard Cup ===
The 2002 Bartercard Cup was the third season of the Bartercard Cup competition run by the New Zealand Rugby League. After the Ngongotaha Chiefs had withdrawn from the competition halfway through 2001 the New Zealand Rugby League had to consider the future of franchises. As part of this reorganisation the two Wellington teams, the Porirua Pumas and the Wainuiomata Lions both withdrew and were replaced by a combined Wellington Franchise. The Central Falcons, from Manawatu, and Taranaki Wildcats both joined the competition. 2002 saw the Mt Albert Lions win their first championship after an all Auckland final series.

==== The Teams ====
- Hibiscus Coast were coached by Tony Benson and included Aaron Heremaia, Vinny Dunn, Daniel Floyd, Iafeta Paleaaesina, Tyrone Pau, captain Anthony Seuseu, Jeremy Smith, Shannon Stowers, Karl Te Mata and Regan Wigg.
- Northcote were coached by Geoff Morton and included Karl Johnson, captain Ken McIntosh, Matthew Spence, Jared and Damon Trott and Brent Webb.
- Glenora were coached by Dean Hunter and included captain Gavin Bailey, Karl Edmonson, Sione Faumuina, Fuifui Moimoi and Lee Tamatoa.
- Marist-Richmond were coached by Bernie Perenara and included Jamie Cook, Karl Guttenbeil, Ricky Henry, Tevita Latu, Marcus Perenara, Jerome Ropati, Evarn Tuimavave, Matthew Tuisamoa and Daniel Vasau.
- Mt Albert, in their 75th season, were coached by John Ackland and included Vinnie Anderson, Keneti Asiata, Andreas Bauer, co-captain Steve Buckingham, Sala and David Fa'alogo, Lee Finnerty, Peter Lewis, co-captain Ben Lythe, Hutch Maiava, Wayne McDade and David Myles.
- Otahuhu were coached by Dean Clark and included Isaak Ah Mau, George Carmont, co-captain Esau Mann, Odell Manuel, Vince Mellars, co-captain Boycie Nelson, Meti Noovao, Jonathan Smith, Butch Tua and George Tuakura.
- Eastern were coached by James Leuluai and included David and Paul Fisiiahi, Eddie and Phillip Leuluai, Zebastian Lucky Luisi, Jeremiah Pai, Herewini Rangi and Logan Swann.
- Manurewa were coached by Trevor Clark and included Henry Fa'afili, Cheyenne Motu and Neville Ramsey.
- Taranaki were coached by Alan Jackson and included Cheaf Lee Fakavamoenga. Jackson himself played in one match, coming on as a substitute when his side was reduced to twelve men.
- Central were coached by John Lomax and Peter Sixtus and included Weller Hauraki, David Lomax, Billy Weepu and Sonny Whakarau.
- Wellington were coached by Gerard Stokes and included Lusi Sione.
- Canterbury were coached by Phil Prescott who was assisted by Brent Stuart. The team included Chris Bamford, captain Shane Beyers, Charlie Herekotukutuku, Corey Lawrie, Tangia Tongiia and Vince Whare. Before the season started the Bulls played pre-season matches against the Cronulla Sharks in Timaru at Fraser Park and against a Mainland XIII selection in Christchurch.

==== Seasons Standings ====
Team	Pld	W	D	L	PF	PA	PD	Pts
Mt Albert Lions	16	15	0	1	620	270	350	30
Hibiscus Coast Raiders	16	11	0	5	536	377	159	22
Otahuhu Leopards	16	10	0	6	636	393	243	20
Eastern Tornadoes	16	10	0	6	512	465	47	20
Marist Richmond Brothers	16	9	1	6	581	449	132	19
Wellington Franchise	16	9	1	6	547	449	98	19
Northcote Tigers	16	8	0	8	401	472	-71	16
Glenora Bears	16	5	2	9	394	515	-121	12
Manurewa Marlins	16	5	1	10	377	511	-134	11
Canterbury Bulls	16	5	0	11	386	531	-145	10
Central Falcons	16	3	1	12	330	586	-256	7
Taranaki Wildcats	16	2	2	12	334	636	-302	6

==== The Playoffs ====
Qualifying and elimination finals
2	Hibiscus Coast	40
3	Otahuhu Leopards	16
4	Eastern Tornadoes	22
5	Marist Richmond	56

Semi-finals
1	Mt Albert Lions	24
Hibiscus Coast	26
Otahuhu Leopards	66
Marist Richmond	16

Preliminary final
Mt Albert Lions	36
Otahuhu Leopards	20

Grand final
Hibiscus Coast	20
Mt Albert Lions	24

Match	Winner		Loser
Elimination Play-off	Marist Richmond Brothers	56	Eastern Tornadoes	22
Preliminary Semifinal	Hibiscus Coast Raiders	40	Otahuhu Leopards	16
Elimination Semifinal	Otahuhu Leopards	66	Marist Richmond Brothers	16
Qualification Semifinal	Hibiscus Coast Raiders	26	Mt Albert Lions	24
Preliminary Final	Mt Albert Lions	36	Otahuhu Leopards	20

===== Grand Final =====
Around 5000 watched the match, the last played at Carlaw Park. Sala Fa'alogo was the man of the match.

Team	Half-time	Total
Mt Albert Lions	10	24
Hibiscus Coast Raiders	4	20

==== Awards ====
- Captain of the Year: Ben Lythe (Mt Albert)
- Best Back: Lee Finnerty (Mt Albert)
- Best Forward: Hutch Maiava (Mt Albert)
- Best and Fairest Player: Hutch Maiava (Mt Albert)
- Coach of the Year: John Ackland (Mt Albert)
- Most Points: Boycie Nelson (256; Otahuhu)
- Most Tries: 27; Lee Finnerty (Mt Albert) and Archie Ikihele (Otahuhu)
- Referee of the Year: Bill Shrimpton

=== North Island Super Six ===
Coastline, Taranaki, Waikato, Manawatu, Bay of Plenty and Wellington competed in the North Island Super 6. Wellington and Manawatu did not select players from the Wellington Franchise or Central Falcons respectively.

Team	Pld	W	D	L	PF	PA	Pts
Wellington	5	4	0	1	223	162	8
Manawatu	5	3	0	2	232	172	6
Waikato	5	3	0	2	188	153	6
Coastline	5	3	0	2	169	174	6
Bay of Plenty	5	1	0	4	131	189	2
Taranaki	5	1	0	4	145	238	2

Waikato defeated minor premiers Wellington 46–30 at the Grand Final, held in Wellington.

Waikato were coached by Tawera Nikau and included Herewini Rangi. Manawatu included Rangi Chase and Weller Hauraki. Taranaki were coached by Howie Tamati.

=== South Island Provincial Championship ===
Canterbury A, Otago, Southland, Tasman and the West Coast competed in the South Island Provincial Championship.

Otago won the title, defeating Canterbury A 23–22 in the Grand Final.

Phil Bergman played for Tasman.

=== Mainland Super Ten ===
The Riccarton Knights defeated the Linwood Keas 42–22 to win the Mainland Super 10 championship.

The Thacker Shield was contested as part of the Mainland Super 10, with the holder defending it at every home game. In 2003 the Thacker Shield returned to its original once a year inter-district challenge format.

Super 10 Dreamteam; Fa'atali Sa (Papanui), Charlie Herekotukutuku (Kaiapoi), Clinton Fraser (Sydenham), Hamish Barclay (Riccarton), Sam Lemalie (Linwood), Josh Reuben (Kaiapoi), Aaron Whittaker (Riccarton), Leon Hallie (Otago), Andrew Auimatagi (Linwood), Mathias Pitama (Kaiapoi), Andrew Tallott (Hornby), George Taunga (Southland) and Corey Lawrie (Hornby). Coach: Brent Ringdahl (Riccarton).

=== National Junior Competitions ===
The Kiwi Cup was the National Junior Competition for under-18s and was held between Akarana, Counties-Manukau, Waikato, Canterbury, Wellington and Manawatu. Akarana, who included Jerome Ropati, Epalahame Lauaki, Marcus Perenara and Evarn Tuimavave, defeated Counties-Manukau 42–22 in the final. Counties-Manukau included Toshio Laiseni.

The Foundation Cup was the National Junior Competition for under-16s. The invited teams were Counties-Manukau, Wellington, Akarana, Canterbury, Waikato and Northland. Counties-Manukau, who included Kim Uasi and Willie Heta, defeated Wellington 28–6.

== Australian competitions ==
The New Zealand Warriors competed in the National Rugby League competition. They finished as minor premiers and went on to make the Grand Final before losing to the Sydney Roosters 30–8.

St. Paul's College participated in the Australian Schoolboys Nutri-Grain Cup and made the quarter finals, defeating Erindale College 30-10 and St Dominics College 13–12, before being eliminated 10-6 by Patrician Brothers' College. St Paul's had won a National Schools competition to qualify for the Nutri-Grain Cup, defeating Kelston Boys' High School 20–12 in the Semifinal and Aranui High School 16–6 in the grand final.

== Club competitions ==
=== Auckland ===
The Hibiscus Coast Raiders won the Fox Memorial trophy, defeating Otahuhu 44–40 in double extra time. The Papakura Sea Eagles won the Rukutai Shield (minor premiership). Earlier in the season the Hibiscus Coast Raiders had won the Roope Rooster cup, defeating Marist 64–4 in the final. Ellerslie won the Sharman Cup while the Mount Wellington Warriors won the Phelan Shield.

The Hibiscus Coast's Willie Bishop won the Best and Fairest award and the Bert Humphries Memorial Trophy as best back in the competition. Junior Asiata from Otahuhu won the Bert Humphries Memorial Trophy as best forward while Papakura's Stuart Heslop won the Most Improved award. Asiata also won the Rothville Trophy as player of the year while Bishop was awarded the Lance Painter Rosebowl as top goal kicker. Otahuhu's Shane Dance won the Lipscombe Cup as Sportsman of the Year.

Papakura were coached by Kelly Shelford while Mount Albert included Carl Doherty and Manukau included Ben Vaeau.

=== Wellington ===
The Randwick Kingfishers won the Wellington Rugby League title, defeating the Wainuiomata Lions in the grand final.

=== Canterbury ===
Riccarton won the Canterbury Rugby League title, defeating Linwood 54–14 in the grand final.

Aaron Whittaker and Logan Edwards played for Riccarton. Kane Ferris played for Linwood.

=== Other Competitions ===
Turangawaewae and the Taniwharau Rugby League Club met in the inaugural Waicoa Bay grand final with Taniwharau winning 28–26. Turangawaewae won the Waikato Rugby League Premiership. The Ngongotaha Chiefs defeated Pikiao to win the Bay of Plenty Rugby League competition. Te Paamu, who included Andrew Leota, defeated Kawerau 46–22 in the Coastline final.

The Waitara Bears defeated Marist 26–12 in the Taranaki Rugby League grand final. Linton, who included Jesse Royal, defeated Levin 48–26 in the Manawatu Rugby League grand final.

Blenheim Central defeated Nelson 32–12 in the Tasman grand final while Suburbs won the West Coast Rugby League title by defeating Cobden-Kohinoor 28–20.

Preceded by 2001 Bartercard Cup	Bartercard Cup; 2002	Succeeded by 2003 Bartercard Cup
