= 2004 New Zealand rugby league season =

Seasons
- 2003 2005

The 2004 New Zealand rugby league season was the 97th season of rugby league that had been played in New Zealand. The main feature of the year was the fifth season of the Bartercard Cup competition that was run by the New Zealand Rugby League. The Mt Albert Lions won the Cup by defeating the Marist Richmond Brothers 40–20 in the Grand Final.

== International competitions ==
The New Zealand national rugby league team played Australia at North Harbour Stadium as part of the Tri-Nations tournament. The match was drawn 16-all. New Zealand finished third in the tournament, after failing to win in Great Britain. Earlier in the year New Zealand had lost the ANZAC Test 37–10 in Newcastle. New Zealand were coached by Daniel Anderson and for the Tri-Nations included; Vinnie and Louis Anderson, Roy Asotasi, Jason and Nathan Cayless, Alex Chan, Joe Galuvao, Dene Halatau, Shontayne Hape, David Kidwell, Wairangi Koopu, Ali Lauiti'iti, Thomas Leuluai, Francis Meli, Robbie Paul, Tony Puletua, Paul Rauhihi, Logan Swann, Motu Tony, Clinton Toopi, Matt Utai, Nigel Vagana, Lesley Vainikolo, Brent Webb, Paul Whatuira, captain Ruben Wiki, Jamahl Lolesi, Henry Fa'afili and Sonny Bill Williams. Sione Faumuina, Tevita Latu, Stephen Kearney and Jerry Seuseu played in the ANZAC Test but did not tour at the end of the year.

2004-10-16

New Zealand	16–16	Australia

North Harbour Stadium, Auckland
Attendance: 19,118

New Zealand hosted the 2004 Pacific Cup which was played between New Zealand Māori, Fiji, Samoa, New Caledonia, Tonga and the Cook Islands. New Zealand Māori were coached by Tawera Nikau who was assisted by Terry Hermansson. The team included Aoterangi Herangi, Charlie Herekotukutuku, Herewini Rangi, Sonny Whakarau and Odell Manuel. During the season the New Zealand Māori Rugby League was put under New Zealand Rugby League administration after racking up $85,000 worth of debt.

A New Zealand A side hosted New South Wales Country and, four months later, a Jim Beam Cup selection. The team included Frank-Paul Nuuausala, Paul Atkins, David Fisiiahi, Paul Fisiiahi, Misi Taulapapa, Karl Johnson, Corey Lawrie, captain Steve Buckingham, Simon Mannering, Daniel Vasau, Kane Ferris and Lee Tamatoa. They defeated the Country side 36-18 but lost to the Jim Beam Cup side 18–6.

Both teams took on Auckland in warm up matches. Auckland were coached by Stan Martin and included Paul Fisiiahi, Karl Johnson, Misi Taulapapa, Herewini Rangi, Anthony Swann and Paul Atkins. Auckland defeated NSW Country 22-14 but lost to the Jim Beam Cup side 30–28.

A Residents team had competed at the Rugby League World Sevens earlier in the year. Coached by Graeme Norton, that team included Daniel Floyd, Steve Matai, Regan Wigg, Shannon Stowers and Gary Tupou.

The Russian team toured the South Island, playing matches against the Tasman Orcas, the West Coast, Southland and Otago. They lost to the Tasman Orcas 32–16 in the opening game of the tour.

Sonny Bill Williams was named the New Zealand Rugby League's player of the year while referee Glen Black was named referee of the year.

== National competitions ==
=== Bartercard Cup ===
The 2004 Bartercard Cup was the fifth season of the Bartercard Cup competition run by the New Zealand Rugby League. There were two major team changes before the start of the season. In Auckland, the Manurewa Marlins were replaced by the Counties Manukau Jetz franchise. Some clubs who had previously been aligned with the Marlins became affiliated with the Eastern Tornadoes. Due to the changing boundaries, the Ellerslie club left the Tornadoes and joined with the Otahuhu Leopards to form the Otahuhu Ellerslie Leopards. Outside of Auckland the Taranaki Wildcats dropped out of the competition after two dreadful seasons. In their place the Waicoa Bay Stallions were formed, representing the Waikato, Bay of Plenty and Coastlines districts. The Canterbury Bulls were again the only non-Auckland team to make the playoffs.

==== The Teams ====
- Coached by Tony Benson, Hibiscus Coast included Odell Manuel, Daniel Floyd, Shannon Stowers, Iafeta Paleaaesina and Vinny Dunn. Tony Martin and Karl Temata were assigned to the club by the New Zealand Warriors.
- North Harbour were coached by Karl Benson and Ken McIntosh and included Brent Webb, Jared Trott, Karl Johnson and Daniel Vasau. Louis Anderson was assigned to the club by the Warriors.
- Glenora had Sione Faumuina and Epalahame Lauaki assigned to the club by the Warriors. They were coached by Geoff Morton and included Lee Tamatoa and Karl Edmondson.
- Marist Richmond were coached by Bernie Perenara and included Karl Guttenbeil, Marcus Perenara, Tangi Ropati, Ricky Henry, Evarn Tuimavave and Misi Taulapapa. Tevita Latu, Francis Meli and Jerome Ropati were assigned to the club by the Warriors.
- Mount Albert were coached by Brian McClennan and included Gus Malietoa-Brown, Fabian Soutar, Andreas Bauer, captain Steve Buckingham, Anthony Swann and Tony Tuimavave. Vinnie Anderson and Mark Tookey were assigned to the club by the Warriors.
- Eastern were coached by Boss Cecil and included Justin Murphy, Zebastian Lucky Luisi, Richard Piakura and Herewini Rangi. Matt Jobson and Herewini Rangi were assigned to the club by the Warriors.
- Otahuhu-Ellerslie were coached by James Leuluai and included Thomas Leuluai, Frank-Paul Nu'uausala, Toshio Laiseni, Manu Vatuvei, Shaun Metcalf, Paul Atkins and David and Paul Fisiiahi.
- Counties Manukau were coached by Dean Hunter and included Lee Finnerty and Sala Fa'alogo. Henry Fa'afili was assigned to the club by the Warriors.
- Waicoa Bay were co-coached by Tawera Nikau and Len Reid and included Sam Rapira. Lance Hohaia and Wairangi Koopu were assigned to the club by the Warriors.
- Central included David Lomax as player-coach, Peter Sixtus as co-coach and Sonny Whakarau.
- Wellington, coached by Paul Bergman, included Simon Mannering, Earl Va'a, Vince Mellars and Issac Luke.
- Canterbury were coached by Phil Prescott and included Charlie Herekotukutuku, Kaine Manihera, Vince Whare, Corey Lawrie and Kane Ferris. Brent Stuart was the assistant coach. Richard Villasanti was assigned to the club by the Warriors.

==== Seasons Standings ====
Team	Pld	W	D	L	PF	PA	PD	Pts
Marist Richmond Brothers	16	13	1	2	500	306	194	27
Otahuhu Ellerslie Leopards	16	12	0	4	476	321	155	24
Mt Albert Lions	16	12	0	4	522	378	144	24
North Harbour Tigers	16	9	1	6	469	374	95	19
Canterbury Bulls	16	9	0	7	562	374	188	18
Wellington Franchise	16	8	1	7	465	409	56	17
Counties Manukau Jetz	16	7	1	8	448	441	7	15
Eastern Tornadoes	16	6	1	9	378	584	-206	13
Waicoa Bay Stallions	16	4	2	10	380	455	-75	10
Central Falcons	16	4	2	10	376	508	-132	10
Glenora Bears	16	3	3	10	341	530	-189	9
Hibiscus Coast Raiders	16	3	0	13	266	503	-237	6

==== The Playoffs ====
Qualifying and elimination finals
2	Otahuhu Ellerslie	28
3	Mt Albert Lions	38
4	North Harbour Tigers	45
5	Canterbury Bulls	10

Semi-finals
1	Marist Richmond	35
Mt Albert Lions	22
Otahuhu Ellerslie	25
North Harbour Tigers	6

Preliminary final
Mt Albert Lions	35
Otahuhu Ellerslie	22

Grand final
Marist Richmond	20
Mt Albert Lions	40

Match	Winner		Loser
Elimination Play-off	North Harbour Tigers	45	Canterbury Bulls	10
Preliminary Semifinal	Mt Albert Lions	38	Otahuhu Ellerslie Leopards	28
Elimination Semifinal	Otahuhu Ellerslie Leopards	25	North Harbour Tigers	6
Qualification Semifinal	Marist Richmond Brothers	35	Mt Albert Lions	22
Preliminary Final	Mt Albert Lions	35	Otahuhu Ellerslie Leopards	22

===== Grand Final =====
The final was held at Ericsson Stadium, with the Fox Memorial Grand Final as a curtain raiser.

Team	Total
Mt Albert Lions	40
Marist Richmond Brothers	20

== Australian competitions ==
The New Zealand Warriors competed in the National Rugby League competition. They finished 14th out of 15 teams and failed to make the playoffs.

== Club competitions ==
=== Auckland ===
The Mt Albert Lions won the Fox Memorial trophy, defeating the Mangere East Hawks 14–10 in the final. Mangere East won the Rukutai Shield (minor premiership). The Ellerslie Eagles won the preseason Roope Rooster trophy.

=== Canterbury ===
Riccarton won the Canterbury Rugby League title.

=== Other Competitions ===
The Ngongotaha Chiefs defeated Ngaruawahia in Rotorua to win the Waicoa Bay championship.

Preceded by 2003 Bartercard Cup	Bartercard Cup; 2004	Succeeded by 2005 Bartercard Cup
