= 2003 New Zealand rugby league season =

Seasons
- 2002 2004

The 2003 New Zealand rugby league season was the 96th season of rugby league that had been played in New Zealand. The main feature of the year was the fourth season of the Bartercard Cup competition that was run by the New Zealand Rugby League. The Canterbury Bulls won the Cup by defeating the Marist Richmond Brothers 32–28 in the Grand Final.

== International competitions ==
The New Zealand national rugby league team played Australia home and away, losing in Australia before defeating them 30–16 at North Harbour Stadium. Coached by Daniel Anderson, New Zealand included; David Vaealiki, Matt Utai, Nigel Vagana, Clinton Toopi, Francis Meli, Willie Talau, Stacey Jones, Paul Rauhihi, Richard Swain, captain Ruben Wiki, Stephen Kearney, Logan Swann, Awen Guttenbeil, Monty Betham, Jerry Seuseu, Tony Puletua, Joe Galuvao, Vinnie Anderson, Sione Faumuina, Motu Tony, Nathan and Jason Cayless, Thomas Leuluai, Ali Lauiti'iti and Henry Fa'afili.

A New Zealand 'A' side toured Great Britain. The team played in five matches with their best result being a draw. They drew with Cumbria 24-all and lost to National League Two 27–8, Warrington 28–26, National League One 40-28 and the full Great Britain side 52–18. The team was coached by Gerard Stokes and included Shane Beyers, Paul Fisiiahi, Steve Buckingham, Aoterangi Herangi, Tyrone Pau, George Tuakura, Lusi Sione, Jesse Royal, Tame Tupou, Wayne McDade, Epalahame Lauaki and Ben Lythe.

The New Zealand Māori team toured France. The team included Phillip Shead whose brother, Artie, played against him for France. Former New Zealander Vincent Wulf also played for France. Coached by Bernie Perenara, the Māori side also included Herewini Rangi, Jeremy Smith and Aaron Heremaia, who captained the side.

Ruben Wiki was named the New Zealand Rugby League player of the year. Thomas Leuluai was the Rookie of the Year.

== National competitions ==
=== Bartercard Cup ===
The 2003 Bartercard Cup was the fourth season of the Bartercard Cup competition run by the New Zealand Rugby League. There were no major team changes however the North Harbour Tigers replaced the Northcote Tigers as they now represented all of the North Shore clubs. The Canterbury Bulls finished as minor premiers and were the only non-Auckland team to make the finals.

==== The Teams ====
- Hibiscus Coast were coached by Tony Benson and included Odell Manuel, Tyrone Pau and Aaron Heremaia.
- The North Harbour side included Mark Robinson.
- Glenora included Epalahame Lauaki.
- Marist Richmond were coached by Bernie Perenara and included Ricky Henry, Karl Guttenbeil, Tangi Ropati, Evarn Tuimavave, Tevita Latu, Jerome Ropati, Marcus Perenara, Steve Matai and Motu Tony.
- Mt Albert included Steve Buckingham, Wayne McDade and Meti Noovao. John Ackland finished the season as coach after originally leaving the club to coach the Villeneuve Leopards.
- Otahuhu included Boycie Nelson and George Tuakura.
- The Eastern Tornadoes included Paul Fisi'iahi, Herewini Rangi, Zebastian Lucky Luisi and Tame Tupou.
- Manurewa were coached by Kelly Shelford.
- Taranaki were coached by Alan Jackson.
- Central were coached by Peter Sixtus and included Jesse Royal and Sonny Whakarau.
- Wellington were coached by Gerard Stokes and included John Tamanika.
- Canterbury were coached by Phil Prescott and included Kane Ferris, Richard Villasanti, Charlie Herekotukutuku, Lusi Sione, Vince Whare, Shane Beyers and Corey Lawrie.

==== Season standings ====
Team	Pld	W	D	L	PF	PA	PD	Pts
Canterbury Bulls	16	13	0	3	648	370	278	26
Mt Albert Lions	16	13	0	3	530	328	202	26
Marist Richmond Brothers	16	12	1	3	627	406	221	25
Hibiscus Coast Raiders	16	12	0	4	573	319	254	24
Eastern Tornadoes	16	11	1	4	675	381	294	23
North Harbour Tigers	16	6	2	8	496	403	93	14
Manurewa Marlins	16	6	1	9	480	544	-64	13
Glenora Bears	16	5	1	10	458	514	-56	11
Otahuhu Leopards	16	5	1	10	432	594	-162	11
Central Falcons	16	4	0	12	374	578	-204	8
Wellington Franchise	16	4	1	11	460	646	-186	6*
Taranaki Wildcats	16	1	0	15	262	932	-670	2

*Wellington were docked three points for registration infringements.

==== The Playoffs ====
Qualifying and elimination finals
2	Mt Albert Lions	30
3	Marist Richmond	33
4	Hibiscus Coast	8
5	Eastern Tornadoes	10

Semi-finals
1	Canterbury Bulls	40
Marist Richmond	18
Mt Albert Lions	42
Eastern Tornadoes	20

Preliminary final
Marist Richmond	36
Mt Albert Lions	26

Grand final
Canterbury Bulls	32
Marist Richmond	28

Match	Winner		Loser
Elimination Play-off	Eastern Tornadoes	10	Hibiscus Coast Raiders	8
Preliminary Semifinal	Marist Richmond Brothers	32	Mt Albert Lions	30
Elimination Semifinal	Mt Albert Lions	42	Eastern Tornadoes	20
Qualification Semifinal	Canterbury Bulls	40	Marist Richmond Brothers	18
Preliminary Final	Marist Richmond Brothers	36	Mt Albert Lions	26

===== Grand Final =====
The Grand Final was held at Ericsson Stadium with the Fox Memorial Grand Final as a curtain raiser.

Team	Half Time	Total
Canterbury Bulls	6	32
Marist Richmond Brothers	12	28

==== Awards ====
- Player of the Year: Shane Beyers
- Coach of the Year: Phil Prescott
- Personality of the Year: Gary Endacott

=== North Island Championship Provincial Competition ===
Four teams competed in the North Island Championship Provincial Competition; Northland, Waikato, Bay of Plenty and the Coastline Mariners.

== Australian competitions ==
The New Zealand Warriors competed in the National Rugby League competition. They finished 6th out of 15 teams and won two games before losing the Preliminary Final to eventual premiers the Penrith Panthers.

== Club competitions ==
=== Auckland ===
The Mangere East Hawks won both the Fox Memorial trophy and the Rukutai Shield (minor premiership). They defeated the Hibiscus Coast Raiders 30–29 in the Grand Final. The Raiders had earlier won the preseason Roope Rooster trophy.

The Northcote Tigers won the Sharman Cup (Division Two) while East Coast Bays won the Phelan Shield (Division Three).

=== Wellington ===
Petone and the Wainuiomata Lions contested the Wellington Rugby League Grand Final. It was played at Maidstone Park on 13 September. Marvin Karawana played in the final for the Lions.

=== Canterbury ===
Halswell won the Canterbury Rugby League title.

Riccarton hosted Runanga in the annual Thacker Shield challenge.

=== Other Competitions ===
Turangawaewae defeated Taniwharau in the Waicoa Bay championship.

The Marist Dragons and Waitara Bears met in the Taranaki Rugby League grand final.

Preceded by 2002 Bartercard Cup	Bartercard Cup; 2003	Succeeded by 2004 Bartercard Cup
