= 2005 New Zealand rugby league season =

Seasons
- 2004 2006

The 2005 New Zealand rugby league season was the 98th season of rugby league that had been played in New Zealand. The main feature of the year was the sixth season of the Bartercard Cup competition that was run by the New Zealand Rugby League. The Mt Albert Lions won the Cup by defeating the Canterbury Bulls 24–22 in the Grand Final.

== International competitions ==
The New Zealand national rugby league team played Australia at Auckland's Ericsson Stadium as part of the Tri-Nations. New Zealand lost this match 26-28 but went on to win the tournament, defeating Australia 24–0 in the final at Elland Road. Earlier in the year New Zealand had lost the ANZAC Test, 16–32. Coached by Brian McClennan, for the Tri-Nations New Zealand included; Louis Anderson, Roy Asotasi, Nathan Cayless, David Faiumu, Awen Guttenbeil, Shontayne Hape, Lance Hohaia, Stacey Jones, David Kidwell, Ali Lauiti'iti, Iafeta Paleaaesina, Frank Pritchard, Tony Puletua, Paul Rauhihi, David Solomona, Motu Tony, Clinton Toopi, Nigel Vagana, Manu Vatuvei, Brent Webb, Jake Webster, Paul Whatuira, Bronson Harrison and captain Ruben Wiki. Jerome Ropati, Matt Utai, Benji Marshall, Thomas Leuluai, Wairangi Koopu, Dene Halatau and Jamahl Lolesi played in the ANZAC Test but did not tour. Daniel Anderson coached the Kiwis in the ANZAC Test before resigning in June and being replaced by McClennan.

21 October 2005

Australia	28–26	New Zealand

Ericsson Stadium, Auckland
Attendance: 15,400

In February a New Zealand Residents team competed in the St Marys Invitational Sevens tournament in Sydney. The Team included Paul Atkins and Charlie Herekotukutuku A full Residents team then played against a New South Wales Country side and a Jim Beam Cup selection in October. The team was coached by Phil Prescott and included Shane Beyers and Corey Lawrie.

The New Zealand Māori side hosted the Cook Islands in October, the three match series was drawn 1-all and broadcast live on Māori Television. The New Zealand Māori were coached by Tawera Nikau while Kevin Iro coached the Cook Islands. The New Zealand Māori included Weller Hauraki, Kaine Manihera, Herewini Rangi and Aaron Heremaia while Cook Islands team included George Tuakura and Marty Mitchell.

New Zealand hosted the 2005 Women's Rugby League World Cup. The Kiwi Ferns won the tournament, defeating the New Zealand Māori side in the final.

== National competitions ==
=== Bartercard Cup ===
The 2005 Bartercard Cup was the sixth season of the Bartercard Cup competition run by the New Zealand Rugby League. The Mount Albert Lions claimed their third and final premiership, as in 2006 they were replaced by the Auckland Lions.

==== The Teams ====
- Hibiscus Coast were coached by Tony Benson and included Odell Manuel.
- North Harbour were coached by Karl Benson and Ken McIntosh. During a mid-season training session New Zealand A prop Ben Valeni collapsed and died from a heart attack. Gene Ngamu made a mid-season come back for the Tigers. The team included Daniel Vasau.
- Marist Richmond were coached by Bernie Perenara and included Misi Taulapapa.
- Mt Albert were coached by Brian McClennan and included Fabian Soutar, Phillip Shead, Andreas Bauer, Paul Fisiiahi and Steve Buckingham. During the season forward Paulo Teniseli died suddenly.
- Otahuhu-Ellerslie included Toshio Laiseni, Cooper Vuna, Paul Atkins, Bryan Henare and George Tuakura.
- Waicoa Bay were coached by Tawera Nikau.
- Central were coached by David Lomax and included Sonny Whakarau in his final year for the side.
- Wellington were coached by Paul Bergman .
- Canterbury were coached by Phil Prescott with Brent Stuart the assistant coach. The squad included Kaine Manihera, Shane Beyers, Lewis Brown, Charlie Herekotukutuku and Corey Lawrie. During the season the Bulls played a home game at Wingham Park on the West Coast, the first game to be played outside of Christchurch. During the season Beyers became only the second player to play 100 Bartercard Cup matches.

==== Seasons Standings ====
Team	Pld	W	D	L	PF	PA	PD	Pts
Mt Albert Lions	16	12	0	4	570	326	244	24
Canterbury Bulls	16	11	0	5	543	388	155	22
Counties Manukau Jetz	16	11	0	5	445	379	66	22
North Harbour Tigers	16	10	0	6	508	323	185	20
Hibiscus Coast Raiders	16	9	2	5	512	362	150	20
Otahuhu Ellerslie Leopards	16	9	0	7	442	412	30	18
Marist Richmond Brothers	16	8	2	6	399	387	12	18
Wellington Franchise	16	5	3	8	418	459	-41	13
Central Falcons	16	4	3	9	299	531	-232	11
Glenora Bears	16	4	1	11	388	486	-98	9
Eastern Tornadoes	16	3	1	12	339	558	-219	7
Waicoa Bay Stallions	16	3	0	13	368	620	-252	6

==== The Playoffs ====
Qualifying and elimination finals
2	Canterbury Bulls	36
3	Counties Manukau	18
4	North Harbour Tigers	30
5	Hibiscus Coast	20

Semi-finals
1	Mt Albert Lions	24
Canterbury Bulls	34
Counties Manukau	32
North Harbour Tigers	30

Preliminary final
Mt Albert Lions	39
Counties Manukau	22

Grand final
Canterbury Bulls	22
Mt Albert Lions	24

Match	Winner		Loser
Elimination Play-off	North Harbour Tigers	30	Hibiscus Coast Raiders	20
Preliminary Semifinal	Canterbury Bulls	36	Counties Manukau Jetz	18
Elimination Semifinal	Counties Manukau Jetz	32	North Harbour Tigers	30
Qualification Semifinal	Canterbury Bulls	34	Mt Albert Lions	24
Preliminary Final	Mt Albert Lions	39	Counties Manukau Jetz	22

===== Grand Final =====
The Canterbury Bulls lost the grand final when Fabian Soutar scored for Mt Albert in the last second of the match.

Team	Total
Mt Albert Lions	24
Canterbury Bulls	22

Tries (Mt Albert Lions)	2: P.Ah Van
	1: R.Baxter, P.Fisi'iahi, F.Soutar
Tries (Canterbury Bulls)	1: J.O'Brien, T.Pelenise, D.Metcalf, C.Lawrie
Goals (Mt Albert Lions)	2: S.Buckingham
Goals (Canterbury Bulls)	3: J.O'Brien
Venue	Ericsson Stadium

== Australian competitions ==
The New Zealand Warriors competed in the National Rugby League competition. They finished 11th out of 15 teams and failed to make the playoffs.

== Club competitions ==
=== Auckland ===
The Manurewa Marlins won the Fox Memorial trophy while the Papakura Sea Eagles won the Rukutai Shield (minor premiership). Manurewa, who were coached by Rusty Matua and player-coach Richie Blackmore won the Grand Final 34–24 over Papakura.

The Howick Hornets won the Sharman Cup (Division Two).

=== Wellington ===
Petone play North City at Rugby League Park in the Wellington Rugby League grand final. As of 2011, this is the last major game of rugby league to be played at the venue.

=== Canterbury ===
Linwood won the Canterbury Rugby League title.

=== Other Competitions ===
Turangawaewae defeated Taniwharau to win the Waicoa Bay grand final.

2005 was the first year of the Eastern Alliance club rugby league competition, which involved clubs from the Hawke's Bay Rugby League and Gisborne Tairawhiti Rugby League.

Preceded by 2004 Bartercard Cup	Bartercard Cup; 2005	Succeeded by 2006 Bartercard Cup
