= Bartercard Cup seasons 2003–2005 =

The Bartercard Cup was a rugby league club competition in New Zealand that ran from 2000 until 2007. Bartercard Cup seasons 2003-2005 may refer to:

- 2003 Bartercard Cup
- 2004 Bartercard Cup
- 2005 Bartercard Cup
