= Tatupu =

Tatupu is a Samoan surname that may refer to the following notable people:

- Josh Tatupu (born 1986), New Zealand-born Samoan rugby league and rugby union footballer
- Lofa Tatupu (born 1982), American football linebacker, son of Mosi
- Mosi Tatupu (1955–2010), National Football League special teamer and running back from American Samoa
- Shem Tatupu (born 1968), New Zealand rugby league and rugby union footballer
- Tony Tatupu (born 1969), New Zealand and Western Samoa rugby league footballer
