= Lee Finnerty =

New Zealand rugby league footballer

Personal information
- Born: 30 April 1978 (age 48) New Zealand

Playing information
- Position: Fullback
Club
| Years | Team | Pld | T | G | FG | P |
|---|---|---|---|---|---|---|
| 2003 | Halifax Blue Sox | 20 | 5 | 2 | 0 | 24 |

Lee Finnerty (born 30 April 1978) is a New Zealand former rugby league footballer who played professionally for the Halifax Blue Sox.

== Playing career ==
Finnerty joined the Marist Richmond Brothers in 2000 with the launch of the Bartercard Cup.

Finnerty played for the Mt Albert Lions in the 2001 and 2002 Bartercard Cups and was part of the team that won the 2002 grand final.

Finnerty joined the Halifax Blue Sox for the 2003 season of the Super League. The team was relegated at the end of the year and Finnerty left the club.

Finnerty instead returned to the Bartercard Cup a new team, the Counties Manukau Jetz. In 2004 he was bought in by Bob Bailey to play several matches for Moscow Dynamo in their Challenge Cup challenge.
