= Canterbury Rugby League =

Regional body for administering rugby league in New Zealand

Canterbury Rugby League Inc
Club information
- Nickname: CRL
- Founded: 1912; 114 years ago

Current details
- Ground: Ngā Puna Wai Sports Hub

Canterbury Rugby League is the regional body that administers rugby league in Canterbury, New Zealand. CRL manages local competitions from senior level down to age group competitions. Canterbury Rugby League also manages the Canterbury rugby league team which represents the region in New Zealand competitions. Previously teams have competed in the Bartercard Cup and Lion Red Cup. The CRL is currently part of the South Island Zone which includes the Tasman, West Coast, Otago and Southland regions.

== Club Competition ==
Eight teams currently compete in the Pat Smith Trophy Premiership;

- Celebration Lions
- Eastern Eagles (formerly Aranui)
- Halswell Hornets
- Hornby Panthers
- Linwood Keas
- Northern Bulldogs
- Papanui Tigers
- Riccarton Knights
- Greymouth Greyhounds
- Woolston Rams
- Shirley Hawks
- Sydenham Swans
- Addington Magpies
- Burnham Chevaliers
- Ashburton Barbarians
- Rolleston Warriors

The winner is awarded the Smith Trophy, which dates back to 1913. Since 1967, a playoff system has been used to determine the premiership winners.

== History ==
=== Foundation ===
The organisation was founded on 13 July 1912 at a meeting that included William Moyle, Robert Brunsden, New Zealand representative Charlie Pearce and David McPhail, who had played with St. Helens and Wigan. A.E. Hooper was elected chairman on 17 July and would serve in that position until 1922. Henry Thacker, a mayor and MP, was the first president of the CRL and served from 1912 until 1929. He donated the Thacker Shield in 1913.

Canterbury first played on 7 September 1912 at the Show Grounds against Wellington. Ernie Buckland scored the first rugby league try in Canterbury as Wellington prevailed 5–4. The first local club competition was held in 1913, with four clubs participating. Addington was founded on 31 January 1913, Sydenham one week later on 7 February, Linwood on 12 March and on 14 March St. Albans was formed. The first Canterbury Rugby League Annual General Meeting was held on 31 March 1913.

=== Touring teams ===
In 1955 Canterbury defeated the touring French side 24–12. They defeated Great Britain 18–10, in 1990.

=== Glory Years ===
The early nineties saw a regional Canterbury side that included many future stars. The side was coached by Frank Endacott and included players such as captain Mark Nixon, Mike Culley, Quentin Pongia, Aaron Whittaker, Justin Wallace, Terry Hermansson, Brent Stuart, Paul Johnson, Whetu Taewa, Logan Edwards, Brendon Tuuta, Simon Angell and Mike Dorreen. With the creation of the Lion Red Cup however, many moved franchises and eventually ended up in Australia or England.

=== Lion Red Cup ===
In the Lion Red Cup, from 1994 to 1996, Canterbury was represented by the Christchurch City Shiners and the Canterbury Country Cardinals.

| Team | Season | Pld | W | D | L | PF | PA | PD | Pts | Position | Finals |
|---|---|---|---|---|---|---|---|---|---|---|---|
| Cardinals | 1994 | 22 | 15 | 2 | 5 | 615 | 410 | 205 | 32 | Fourth | Lost preliminary final |
| Shiners | 1994 | 22 | 6 | 0 | 16 | 358 | 630 | −272 | 12 | Eleventh | N/A |
| Cardinals | 1995 | 22 | 9 | 2 | 11 | 446 | 448 | −2 | 20 | Tenth | N/A |
| Shiners | 1995 | 22 | 12 | 1 | 9 | 455 | 419 | 36 | 25 | Sixth | N/A |
| Cardinals | 1996 | 22 | 6 | 1 | 15 | 365 | 555 | −190 | 13 | Tenth | N/A |
| Shiners | 1996 | 22 | 3 | 0 | 19 | 360 | 643 | −283 | 6 | Last | N/A |

=== Bartercard Cup ===
The Canterbury Bulls competed in the Bartercard Cup from 2000 to 2007, winning the title in 2000 & 2003. They were the only franchise from the South Island and the only franchise to play in every season.

| Season | Pld | W | D | L | PF | PA | PD | Pts | Position (Teams) | Finals |
|---|---|---|---|---|---|---|---|---|---|---|
| 2000 | 22 | 15 | 0 | 7 | 658 | 525 | 133 | 30 | Second (Twelve) | Champions |
| 2001 | 22 | 14 | 1 | 7 | 882 | 489 | 393 | 29 | Third (Twelve) | Defeated in Preliminary Final |
| 2002 | 16 | 5 | 0 | 11 | 386 | 531 | −145 | 10 | Tenth (Twelve) | N/A |
| 2003 | 16 | 13 | 0 | 3 | 648 | 370 | 278 | 26 | Minor Premiers (Twelve) | Champions |
| 2004 | 16 | 9 | 0 | 7 | 562 | 374 | 188 | 18 | Fifth (Twelve) | Defeated in Elimination Play-off |
| 2005 | 16 | 11 | 0 | 5 | 543 | 388 | 155 | 22 | Second (Twelve) | Runners Up |
| 2006 | 18 | 13 | 0 | 5 | 583 | 376 | 207 | 26 | Second (Ten) | Runners Up |
| 2007 | 18 | 12 | 0 | 6 | 659 | 430 | 229 | 24 | Third (Ten) | Defeated in Preliminary Final |

=== Bartercard Premiership ===
The Canterbury Bulls competed in the 2008 and 2009 Bartercard Premiership, winning the 2009 competition.

The Canterbury side was again coached by Brent Stuart and Dave Perkins. Former Kiwis assistant coach and Bartercard cup winning Phil Prescott returned as the director of coaching. The Canterbury U16s and U18s sides were involved in curtain raiser matches before the Senior home games.

== Rugby League Park ==
Canterbury Rugby League had a long-term lease on Rugby League Park which was formerly known as the Addington Showgrounds.

In 2011 due to the Christchurch earthquake the Grand stands became too dangerous to inhabit and Canterbury Rugby League were displaced until 2019 when in conjunction with the Christchurch City council, Rugby League purpose-built facilities were built at the Ngā Puna Wai Sports Hub and will be officially opened on 23 February 2019 with an exhibition match between the NZ Warriors and the Canterbury Bulls.

== Notable Juniors ==
Aranui Eagles

- Jamayne Isaako (Melbourne Storm, Dolphins, Gold Coast Titans & Brisbane Broncos)

Greymouth Greyhounds

- Griffin Neame (North Queensland Cowboys)

Halswell Hornets

- Matt McIlwrick (Canberra Raiders & Sydney Roosters)
- Aaron Whittaker (Wakefield Trinity & Auckland Warriors)
- Brackin Karauria-Henry (Brumbies & NSW Waratahs)
- Jarred Lawrence (Canberra Raiders)
- Tanner Stowers-Smith (New Zealand Warriors)

Hornby Panthers

- David Kidwell (Adelaide Rams, Parramatta Eels, Sydney Roosters, Melbourne Storm & South Sydney Rabbitohs)
- Brendon Tuuta (Western Reds & Castleford Tigers)
- Corey Lawrie (New Zealand Warriors)
- Josh Tatupu (Western Force)
- Kaine Manihera (Brisbane Broncos)
- Rulon Nutira (St George-Illawarra Dragons)
- Tevin Arona (New Zealand Warriors)
- Nu Brown (Cronulla Sharks, Wests Tigers & Canterbury-Bankstown Bulldogs)
- Jordan Riki (Brisbane Broncos)
- Caius Fa’atili (Wakefield Trinity)

Linwood Keas

- Brent Todd (Canberra Raiders & Gold Coast Seagulls)
- Sui Pauaraisa (NZ Warriors Women)

Northern Bulldogs

- Matt Duffie (2010– Melbourne Storm)

Papanui Tigers

- Setaimata Sa (2006–14 Sydney Roosters, Catalans Dragons & Hull F.C.)
- Shane Endacott (Auckland Warriors)

Riccarton Knights

- Lewis Brown New Zealand Warriors, Penrith Panthers & Manly Sea Eagles)
- Logan Edwards (Auckland Warriors)
- Quentin Pongia (Canberra Raiders, Sydney Roosters & Auckland Warriors)
- Richie Mo’unga (Canterbury Crusaders, New Zealand All Blacks)

Burnham Chevaliers

- Jayden Nikorima (Sydney Roosters)
- Kodi Nikorima (Brisbane Broncos, New Zealand Warriors & Dolphins (NRL))
- Jazz Tevaga (New Zealand Warriors)
- Siua Wong (Burnham Chevaliers)

Sydenham Swans

- Pita Godinet (New Zealand Warriors & Wests Tigers)
