= Artie Shead =

France international & NZ Maori rugby league footballer

Personal information
- Born: 29 July 1978 (age 48) New Zealand
- Height: 195 cm (6 ft 5 in)
- Weight: 115 kg (18 st 2 lb)

Playing information
- Position: Centre, Prop, Second-row
Club
Years	Team	Pld	T	G	FG	P
1996	North Harbour	3	0	0	0	0
2008–09	Villeneuve Leopards
2009–10	Limoux Grizzlies
	Total	3	0	0	0	0
Representative
Years	Team	Pld	T	G	FG	P
1998	New Zealand Māori
2001–09	France
- Relatives: Phillip Shead (brother)

Artie Shead is a New Zealand former professional rugby league footballer who played in the 1990s, 2000s and 2010s. He played at representative level for Taranaki, New Zealand Māori, France and Harbour League, and at club level for the Northcote Tigers (Juniors), North Harbour, the Pia Donkeys, the Villeneuve Leopards in the Elite One Championship and the Limoux Grizzlies, as a centre, prop or second-row.

He was named in the France national rugby league team on the 2001 tour of New Zealand and Papua New Guinea and for the 2009 Four Nations after qualifying through residency, being born in New Zealand and spending over three years in France.

Shead was a Northcote Tigers junior and represented Harbour League in 2006.

He represented Taranaki and New Zealand Māori in 1998.

He is the younger brother of Phillip Shead.
