= Phillip Shead =

New Zealand rugby league footballer

Personal information
- Born: 15 July 1977 (age 47); New Zealand

Playing information
- Position: Second-row
Club
Years	Team	Pld	T	G	FG	P
1996	Paris Saint-Germain
	Villeneuve Leopards
	Total	0	0	0	0	0
Representative
Years	Team	Pld	T	G	FG	P
1999–03	New Zealand Māori
- Relatives: Artie Shead (brother)

Phillip Shead is a former professional rugby league footballer who played for Paris Saint-Germain and represented both New Zealand Māori and France.

== Playing career ==
Shead was a Northcote Tigers junior along with his younger brother; Artie. In 1992 he represented the New Zealand under-15 side. He went on to represent both Auckland and Taranaki alongside his brother. In 1996 he played in the Super League for the French club Paris Saint-Germain.

He represented New Zealand Māori in three "tests" in 1999 and on a tour of France in 2003. On the French tour he played against his brother, who by then had gained French residency. While playing for the Villeneuve Leopards, Shead himself qualified for France and played at the 2004 Victory Cup.

In 2005, while playing for Mount Albert, he was part of a New Zealand Rugby League's President selection that played a pre-season trial match against the New Zealand Warriors.
