= Fowlds Park =

Park in Auckland, New Zealand

Coordinates: 36.873991°S 174.728794°E

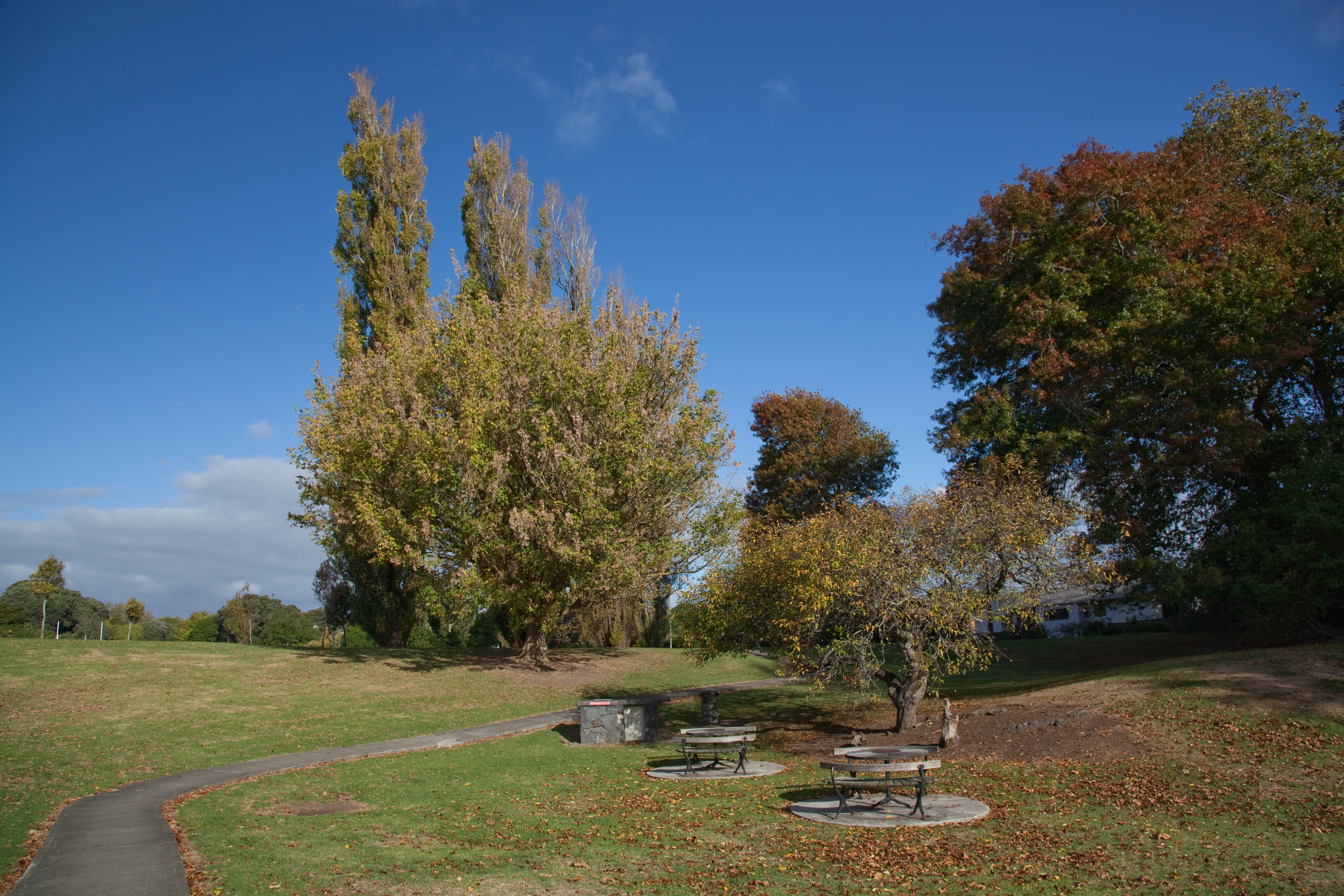
Fowlds Park in 2010.

Fowlds Park is a small public reserve in the northern part of Mount Albert, in Auckland City.

== Description ==
The park is roughly rectangular in shape and of irregular topography. An extensive stand of mature gum trees line the northern boundary at the park's highest point. There are two main playing fields with a sloping bank between them. The eastern entry to the park is dominated by a memorial gateway dedicated to Sir George Fowlds. To the south and west of the gateway are a grove of mature trees and a landscaped rock outcrop.

== History ==
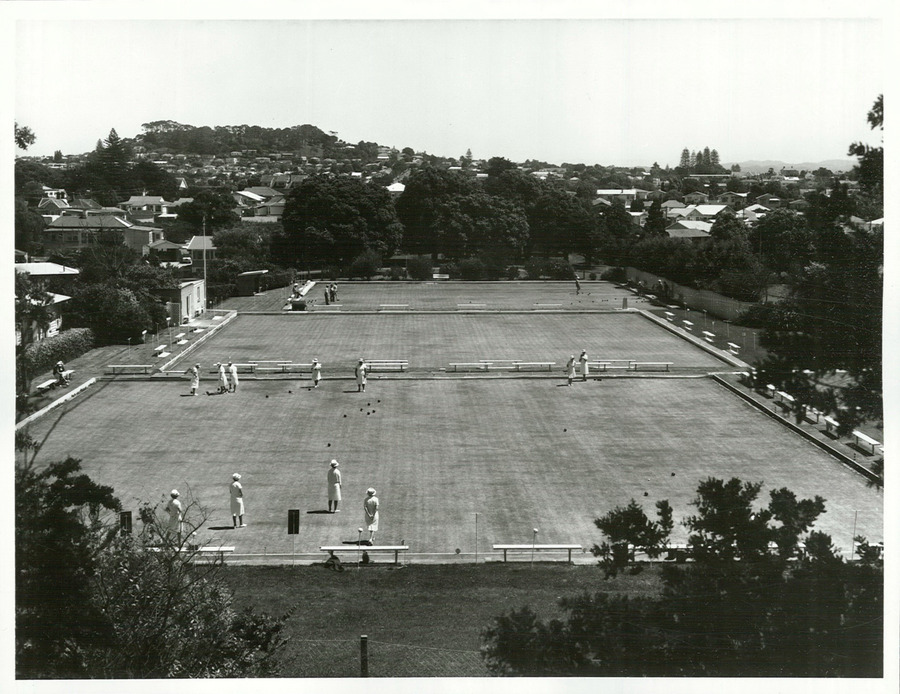
Bowls being played at Fowlds Park (1975).

Previously an asylum endowment, the land was transferred to Mt Albert Domain Board in 1912 in exchange for Council land adjoining the Avondale Mental Hospital. The land was known as the Morningside Reserve and used as a rubbish tip, becoming a scandal in Auckland newspapers in 1921, due to the pests and unpleasant odours associated with the park. After these headlines, local Mount Albert residents were motivated to clean the area, and in May 1928 a playground was constructed, paid for by the Mt Albert Aroha Progressive League.

In 1933, the park was reopened as Fowlds Park, as a tribute to Minister of Health Sir George Fowlds' contributions to the area. The park was redesigned by American landscape architect Fred Tschopp, designing a park that focused on trees that would attract birdlife, instead of more typical designs of the time that focused on flower beds. In 1937, sports fields were developed at Fowlds Park by relief workers, at the end of the Great Depression.

The Mt Albert Rugby League Club has been using the Fowlds Park grounds since before the Second World War. Other early uses of the Reserve included hockey, tennis and croquet. The Rocky Nook Bowling Club became established in the north-eastern part of the Reserve in the mid 1950s taking over an area previously used as tennis courts and croquet greens.

== Uses and amenities ==
The park has been used variously by Mt Albert Ramblers Softball Club, Auckland United Softball, Mount Albert Rovers netball club, the Rocky Nook Bowling Club and a Marching Association and Mt Albert Lions Rugby League Club. At the western end of the park, separated from the main sports fields by a stand of poplar trees, is a smaller informal playing field. In this area of the reserve there is also a children's playground and a public coin-operated barbecue.
