= Shannon Stowers =

Former Samoa international rugby league footballer

Personal information
- Born: 21 March 1980 (age 46) New Zealand

Playing information
- Position: Prop, Second-row
Club
Years	Team	Pld	T	G	FG	P
2004	New Zealand Warriors	2	0	0	0	0
Representative
Years	Team	Pld	T	G	FG	P
2006	Samoa	3	0	0	0	0
- Source: As of 9 February 2021

Shannon Stowers is a former Samoa international rugby league footballer who played as a prop for the Auckland Lions in the NSWRL Premier League competition. As youngster he was a member of the Northern District Dragons whilst in Adelaide SA Rugby League competition, where his father Alfie was the head coach.

== Playing career ==
Stowers played for the Hibiscus Coast Raiders in the 2002 Bartercard Cup.

In 2004 Stowers made two appearances for the New Zealand Warriors in the National Rugby League competition.

== International career ==
He is a Samoa international.
