= Hutch Maiava =

Samoa international rugby league footballer

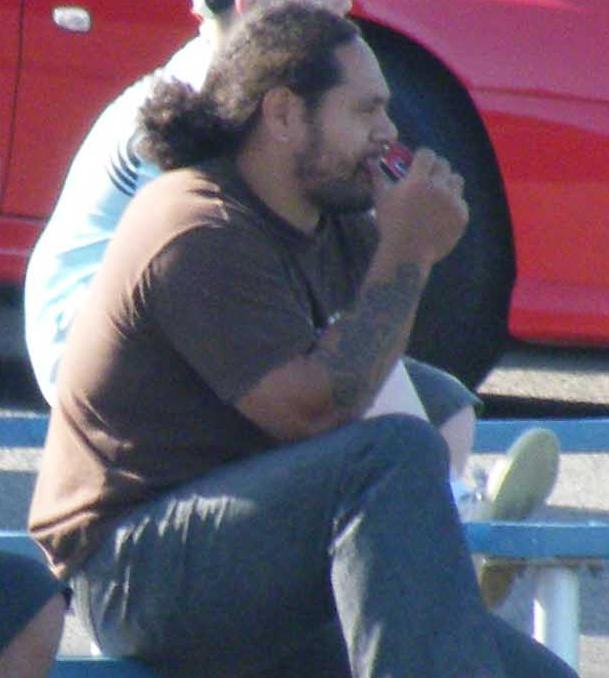

Personal information
- Full name: Edward 'Hutch' Maiava
- Born: 26 October 1976 (age 49) Auckland, New Zealand

Playing information
- Height: 6 ft 0 in (1.83 m)
- Weight: 18 st 0 lb (114 kg)
- Position: Prop
Club
Years	Team	Pld	T	G	FG	P
2004	Canterbury Bulldogs	5	2	0	0	8
2005–06	Cronulla Sharks	40	2	0	0	8
2007	Hull FC	22	2	0	0	4
	Total	67	6	0	0	20
Representative
Years	Team	Pld	T	G	FG	P
2006–08	Samoa	7	3	0	0	12

Hutch Maiava (born 26 October 1976) is a New Zealand former professional rugby league footballer who played for the Cronulla-Sutherland Sharks in the NRL as a prop. He previously played for the Canterbury-Bankstown Bulldogs and Hull FC.

== Playing career ==
A Pt Chev Pirates junior, Maiava has played in the NRL for the Canterbury-Bankstown Bulldogs, and the Cronulla-Sutherland Sharks. Maiva formerly played for Hull F.C. in the Super League but was released from his contract early due to gross misconduct.

Maiava was named in the Samoa training squad for the 2008 Rugby League World Cup. Maiava later played for NSW Sydney Shield side the Blacktown Workers Sea Eagles.
