= Karl Johnson (rugby league) =

New Zealand rugby league footballer

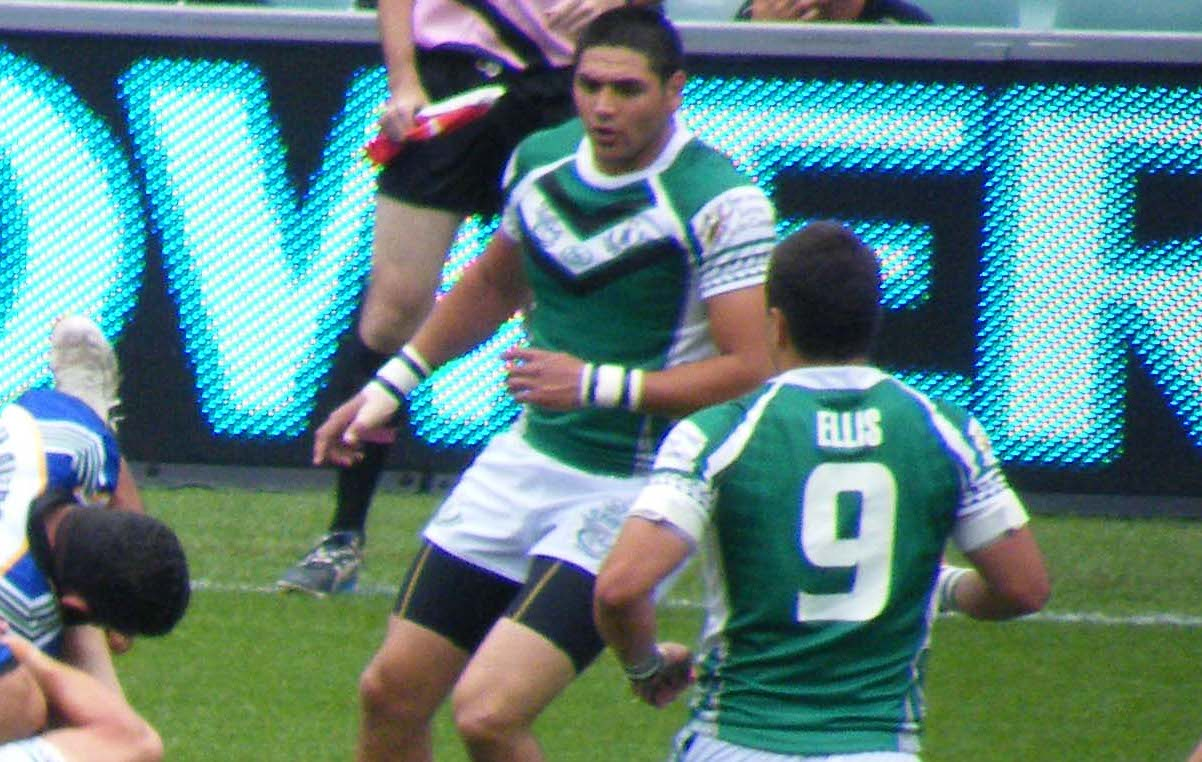

Personal information
- Born: Waiheke Island, New Zealand
- Height: 189 cm (6 ft 2 in)
- Weight: 104 kg (16 st 5 lb)

Playing information
- Position: Centre, Second-row
Representative
Years	Team	Pld	T	G	FG	P
2008	New Zealand Māori	1	0	0	0	0
- As of 10 March 2010

Karl Johnson (birth unknown), is a New Zealand rugby league footballer who currently plays for the Gladstone Past Brothers. He plays as a centre or second-row. He is a New Zealand Māori international.

== Playing career ==
A Waiheke Rams junior, Johnson played for the Northcote Tigers and North Harbour Tigers in the Bartercard Cup between 2002 and 2004 and also represented Auckland in 2004. Johnson was a Junior Kiwi and represented New Zealand 'A'.

In 2006 Johnson played for the North Sydney Bears in the NSWRL Premier League. After being the leading try scorer in the competition he signed a two-year deal with the North Queensland Cowboys in August that year. Johnson was named the '2006 North Sydney Player of the Year'.

He then played Reserve Grade for the Newcastle Knights before joining the Central Comets in the Queensland Cup in 2008. That year he was named in the Queensland Residents.

In 2011 Johnston joined the Past Brothers club in Gladstone.
