= Fabian Soutar =

Cook Islands international rugby league footballer

- Soutar (right) with Brian McClennan after winning the 2006 Bartercard Cup Grand Final

Personal information
- Born: 11 September 1986 (age 39) Wanganui, New Zealand
- Height: 186 cm (6 ft 1 in)
- Weight: 105 kg (16 st 7 lb; 231 lb)

Playing information
- Position: Prop, Second-row
Representative
Years	Team	Pld	T	G	FG	P
2006–09	Cook Islands	5	1	0	0	4
- As of Jan 2010

Fabian Soutar (born 11 September 1986) is a professional rugby league footballer who is currently with the Easts Tigers in the Queensland Cup. His usual position is prop/second row.

== Early years ==
Soutar was born in Wanganui, New Zealand on 11 September 1986. Of Māori and Cook Island descent, he lived his early years in Wanganui. During his primary school years Soutar's family relocated to Auckland. He started his high school years at Green Bay High School but switched to Kelston Boys' High School. In 2004 he was a prefect there.

== Playing career ==
Soutar first played rugby league for the New Lynn Stag under-13's. The following season he moved to the Glenora Bearsclub until the 2004 season when he was signed to the Mt Albert Lions. In 2003 Fabian was a part of the Kelston Boys rugby league team that took out the New Zealand Secondary School's championship. He also made the New Zealand Secondary School team that year. He made his Bartercard Cup debut against the Canterbury Bulls in 2004 at the age of 17. He had three successful seasons with the Brian McClennan coached Mt Albert Lions taking the premiership in 2004, 2005, 2006 (team was renamed the Auckland Lions). Soutar was called into the New Zealand Residents team in 2006 to take part in the Trans Tasman Rugby league Cup which was won by the Residents. In 2007 he was part of the Auckland Lions NSWRL Premier League team that finished in 10th place for the season. He has also played for the Cook Islands.

In 2008 he signed with Easts Tigers based in Queensland, Australia. Fabian started the season playing Fogs cup and was selected to play for a Brisbane Fogs team in the Toyota Centenary Cup Tournament. He made his first Queensland Cup appearance against Mackay Cutters on 10 May 2008. In 2008 Soutar re-signed with Easts Tigers for two more seasons.
