= Brian McClennan =

NZ rugby league footballer & coach

- McClennan with Fabian Soutar after the 2005 Bartercard Cup

Personal information
- Born: 16 February 1962 (age 64) Auckland, New Zealand

Playing information
- Position: Stand-off
Club
Years	Team	Pld	T	G	FG	P
19??–88	Mount Albert Lions
1989–??	Northcote Tigers
19??	Hibiscus Coast
1994	North Harbour	3	0	0	0	0
	Total	3	0	0	0	0
Representative
Years	Team	Pld	T	G	FG	P
1990	Auckland	1	0	0	0	0

Coaching information
Club
Years	Team	Gms	W	D	L	W%
2008–10	Leeds Rhinos	102	73	1	28	72
2012–2012	New Zealand Warriors	22	8	0	14	36
	Total	124	81	1	42	65
Representative
Years	Team	Gms	W	D	L	W%
2005–07	New Zealand	5	7	0	8	140
2011–13	Exiles	2	1	0	1	50
- Source: As of 14 July 2026
- Father: Mike McClennan

Brian "Bluey" McClennan (born 16 February 1962) is a New Zealand former professional rugby league footballer and coach. He was previously the head coach of the New Zealand national team (with whom he won the 2005 Tri-nations) and then England's Leeds Rhinos club (with whom he won the 2008 and 2009 Super League championships).

McClennan also coached the Exiles team in the inaugural International Origin match in 2011 before being appointed head coach of National Rugby League club, the New Zealand Warriors but failing to complete the first season of his contract. McClennan is the son of former St. Helens coach Mike McClennan.

== Playing career ==
McClennan started his playing career at Mt Albert under the guidance of his dad, Mike. He played at Stand Off and also kicked goals. When his dad moved to Northcote in 1989, Brian also moved and was a part of the team which won the Auckland Rugby League grand final that year.

McClennan also represented Auckland and in what was to be his final representative game he captained the province to a win over the touring Great Britain side. However he played for Auckland again, including in the Rugby League Cup challenge against Canterbury in 1994.

In 1994, while player-coach at the Hibiscus Coast Raiders he played several games for the North Harbour Sea Eagles.

== Coaching career ==
=== New Zealand ===
Appointed the North Harbour rugby league development officer in 1994, McClennan assisted U16 Coach John Ackland at the Auckland Warriors in 1995. He then took over as coach of third division Auckland side, the Hibiscus Coast Raiders, and led them to repeated Auckland Rugby League successes until they were invited to be part of the national Bartercard Cup.

He coached the Hibiscus Coast Raiders and Mt Albert Lions to championships in the Bartercard Cup, and was then assistant coach for the Kiwis under Daniel Anderson.

Despite this, his appointment in June 2005 as national coach of New Zealand was controversial, mainly because he had no top-level experience in Australia or Great Britain. However, he led New Zealand to an upset triumph in the 2005 Tri-Nations series. New Zealand won the series final against Australia 24–0 at Elland Road, England. It was Australia's first defeat in a series or tournament since 1978. The margin equalled Australia's biggest ever losing margin.

In 2006, he coached the Auckland Lions to the minor premiership in the Bartercard Cup. However the Kiwis lost both mid-season tests to the Kangaroos and Lions. That year he received the Rugby League International Federation's coach of the year award. In 2007 he served as Director of Football to help the Auckland Lions prepare for their entrance into the NSWRL Premier League before leaving to concentrate on the Kiwis for the rest of the season. In mid-2007 reports emerged that he was looking for a job in the National Rugby League.

=== Super League ===
In July 2007, Leeds Rhinos announced that New Zealand national coach Brian McClennan would be joining the club as Head Coach on a two-year contract from 1 December 2007. McClennan subsequently resigned as national coach, his position taken up by Gary Kemble in August 2007. In his first season as coach, the Rhino's won the 2008 World Club Challenge, beating Melbourne Storm 11–4 at Elland Road. Later that year he coached Leeds to the 2008 Super League Grand Final victory over St Helens.

The following year he achieved the same feat, beating St Helens 18–10 in the 2009 Super League Grand Final at Old Trafford.

He coached Leeds to the 2010 Challenge Cup Final defeat by the Warrington Wolves at Wembley Stadium.

McClennan resigned after 2010's Super League XV, returning to New Zealand and working for the Auckland Rugby League as their development and coaching manager.

In 2011, McClennan was announced as the first coach of the Exiles, a team made up of Australian and New Zealand players contracted to Super League clubs. The Exiles defeated England in June in the first International Origin Match, a fixture intended to become an annual contest.

=== NRL ===
On 1 August 2011, McClennan was appointed Ivan Cleary's replacement as head coach of National Rugby League side, the New Zealand Warriors for the 2012 and 2013 seasons, as Cleary had signed on to coach the Penrith Panthers at the end of the 2011 season. After eight wins in 22 matches, including two losses after leading by 18 points, a 45–4 loss at home to the Sharks and a 52–12 loss to the Cowboys in consecutive weeks, McClennan was sacked by the Warriors.
