= Jarred Lawrence =

NZ rugby league footballer (born 1977)

Personal information
- Full name: Jarred Lawrence
- Born: 14 May 1977 (age 49)

Playing information
- Position: Hooker
Club
Years	Team	Pld	T	G	FG	P
2001–04	Canberra Raiders	4	0	0	0	0

Jarred Lawrence (born 14 May 1977) is a former professional rugby league footballer who played for the Canberra Raiders in the National Rugby League.

== Early life ==
Lawrence grew up in Christchurch, New Zealand and was playing rugby league in Queensland when recruited by Canberra.

== Playing career ==
Lawrence made his first-grade debut in Newcastle against the Knights in Round 21 of the 2001 season.

Over the next two years he was restricted to the reserves and featured in Canberra's 2003 Premier League grand final win over Penrith.

In 2004, he returned to first-grade for the first two rounds of the season, then made his fourth and final appearance in the qualifying final loss to the Sydney Roosters, as a replacement hooker for suspended captain Simon Woolford.
