= Wayne McDade =

Samoa international rugby league footballer

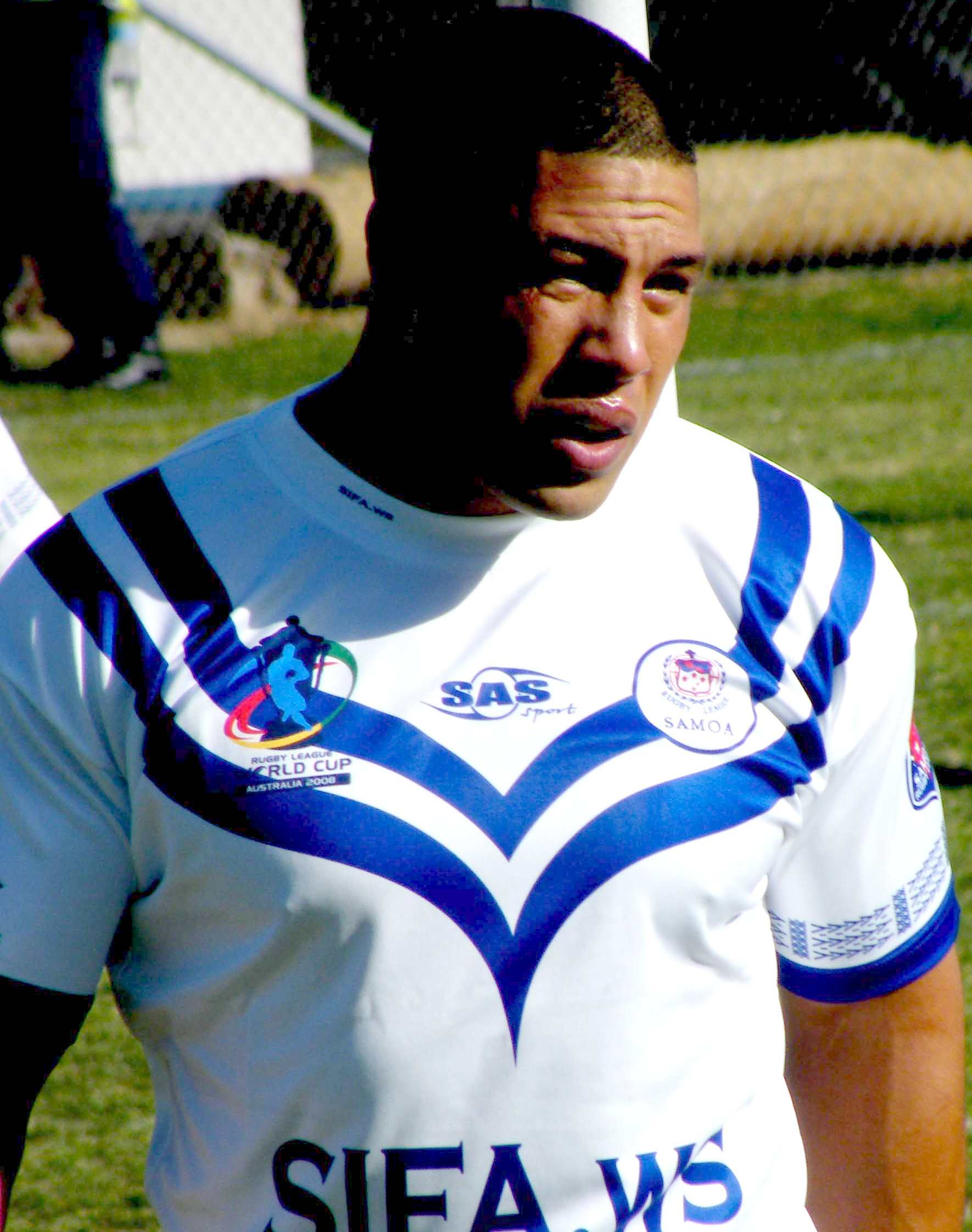

Personal information
- Born: 1 July 1981 (age 44); New Zealand
- Height: 180 cm (5 ft 11 in)
- Weight: 105 kg (16 st 7 lb)

Playing information
- Position: Prop
Representative
Years	Team	Pld	T	G	FG	P
2008	Samoa	2	0	0	0	0
- Source: As of 25 March 2007

Wayne McDade (born 1 July 1981) is a former Samoa international rugby league footballer who played as a prop.

== Background ==
McDade was born in New Zealand.

== Playing career ==
A Richmond Bulldogs junior, McDade has appeared in the NSWRL Premier League for the North Sydney Bears, and the Auckland Lions. In 2008 he was contracted to the New Zealand Warriors but did not play a first grade game. McDade has since played for the Mt Albert Lions and Auckland Vulcans.

== Representative career ==
McDade was named in the Samoa squad for the 2008 Rugby League World Cup, and played in two matches.
