= Josh Tatupu =

Former Samoa dual-code international rugby footballer

Personal information
- Born: Joshua James Tatupu; 6 November 1986 (age 40) Christchurch, New Zealand
- Height: 1.85 m (6 ft 1 in)
- Weight: 102 kg (16 st 1 lb)

Playing information
Club
Years	Team	Pld	T	G	FG	P
2006–07	Baroudeurs de Pia XIII
Representative
Years	Team	Pld	T	G	FG	P
2006	Samoa	1

Rugby union career
- Position: Centre
Senior career
Years	Team	Apps	(Points)
2010–11	Castres	14	(0)
2011–13	Exeter Chiefs	9	(5)
2013	US Carcassonne		
Provincial / State sides
Years	Team	Apps	(Points)
2010	Otago	13	(5)
Super Rugby
Years	Team	Apps	(Points)
2008–10	Western Force	13	(15)
International career
Years	Team	Apps	(Points)
2010–	Samoa	1	(0)

Josh Tatupu (born 6 November 1986) is a New Zealand-born Samoan rugby league and rugby union footballer. It was announced on 31 March 2011 that Tatupu had signed for Aviva Premiership side Exeter Chiefs.

== Career ==
Tatupu started playing Rugby league for Australian Rugby League outfit Melbourne Storm before transferring to Rugby Union to join Super Rugby side Western Force.

Tatupu made his debut for the Western Force in 2008 against the Lions in Johannesburg. Tatupu is also a former league player having represented Samoa. After leaving Western Force he joined Otago in the NPC before joining French side Castres. It was announced on 31 March 2011 that Tatupu will join English side Exeter Chiefs.

On 16 May 2013 French Pro D2 side US Carcassonne side announced on their official website that they had signed Tatupu on a two-year deal.
