= Daniel Vasau =

Tonga international rugby league footballer (born 1982)

Personal information
- Born: 1 August 1982 (age 44)

Playing information
- Position: Halfback
Representative
Years	Team	Pld	T	G	FG	P
2000	Tonga
- Source: RLP

Daniel Vasau (born 1 August 1982) is a Tongan rugby league footballer who represented Tonga at the 2000 World Cup.

== Playing career ==
Vasau was a Richmond Bulldogs junior and won the Auckland Rugby League's best and fairest award in 2000. He was then included in the Tongan side for the 2000 World Cup. In 2001 he was promoted to play for the Marist Richmond Brothers side in the Bartercard Cup. Later that year he won a Prime Minister's scholarship to help his rugby league career.

In 2004 and 2005 he played for the North Harbour Tigers, earning selection for the NZRL's Presidents selection that played the New Zealand Warriors at North Harbour Stadium on 27 February 2005.
