= Kane Ferris =

New Zealand rugby league footballer

Personal information
- Born: 18 September 1984 (age 41) Christchurch, New Zealand

Playing information
- Position: Prop
Club
Years	Team	Pld	T	G	FG	P
2004	New Zealand Warriors	1	0	0	0	0

Kane Ferris is a New Zealand rugby league footballer who previously played in the National Rugby League. His position of preference is Prop.

== Playing career ==
A longtime representative of Canterbury age groups, he made the Junior Kiwis in 2002. He played two matches for the Junior Kiwis, starting at hooker.

After playing for the Canterbury Bulls in the Bartercard Cup he was spotted by the New Zealand Warriors and bought into the 25-man squad for 2004. During that season he played his one and only NRL game, against the Sydney Roosters. Later that year he represented New Zealand 'A' against a Jim Beam Cup Selection.

Since then he returned to Canterbury and played for his original club the Linwood Keas. He was part of the 2008 Canterbury Rugby League squad that competed in the Bartercard Premiership. In 2009 the Linwood Keas reached the grand final.

Ferris transferred to Celebration Centre Lions for the 2011 season, helping guide the Celebration Centre Lions Premiers to their first club Grand Final appearance.
