= Andreas Bauer (rugby league) =

Samoa international rugby league footballer

Personal information
- Born: 26 September 1982 (age 43) Auckland, New Zealand
- Height: 6 ft 0 in (1.83 m)
- Weight: 14 st 7 lb (92 kg)

Playing information
- Position: Centre, Wing
Club
Years	Team	Pld	T	G	FG	P
2007	Hull Kingston Rovers	13	6	0	0	24
2008–09	Doncaster	47	19	0	0	76
2009–10	Barrow Raiders	29	10	0	0	40
2011–12	Whitehaven	26	7	0	0	28
	Total	115	42	0	0	168
Representative
Years	Team	Pld	T	G	FG	P
2007	Samoa	2	1	0	0	4
- Source: As of 15 July 2008

Andreas Bauer (born 26 September 1982) is a former Samoa international rugby league footballer who last played for Whitehaven. Standing 180 cm and weighing 92 kg, he plays in the centre position. He has also played for Hull Kingston Rovers.

== Background ==
Bauer was born in Auckland, New Zealand.

== Career ==
He played for the New Lynn Stags, and for Bartercard Cup side Mt Albert Lions.

In 2005 he represented New Zealand Universities at the Student World Cup which they won. He attended the University of Auckland.

Bauer is of Samoan heritage.
