= Tyrone Pau =

Cook Islands international rugby league footballer

Personal information
- Born: unknown
- Height: 5 ft 11 in (180 cm)
- Weight: 17 st 9 lb (112 kg)

Playing information
- Position: Prop, Second-row
Club
Years	Team	Pld	T	G	FG	P
2002–06	Limoux Grizzlies
2006	Leigh Centurions
2019	Villegailhenc-Aragon XIII
	Total	0	0	0	0	0
Representative
Years	Team	Pld	T	G	FG	P
2000	Cook Islands	2	0	0	0	0
- Source: As of 13 April 2012

Tyrone Pau (birth unknown) is a former professional rugby league who played in the 2000s. He played at representative level for the Cook Islands, Auckland and the New Zealand Residents, and at club level for the Hibiscus Coast Raiders, Limoux Grizzlies, AS Carcassonne, the Leigh Centurions and Villegailhenc-Aragon XIII in the Elite Two Championship, as a centre, prop or second-row.

== Playing career ==
Pau played for the Hibiscus Coast Raiders in 2001 and 2002, being selected in 2001 for Auckland, and in 2002, and 2003 for New Zealand Residents.

Pau then spent five years in France, playing for the Limoux Grizzlies. In 2006 Pau signed with the Leigh Centurions.

== Representative career ==
Tyrone Pau won caps for Cook Islands in the 2000 Rugby League World Cup.
