= Tevita Leo-Latu =

NZ & Tonga international rugby league footballer

Tevita Latu
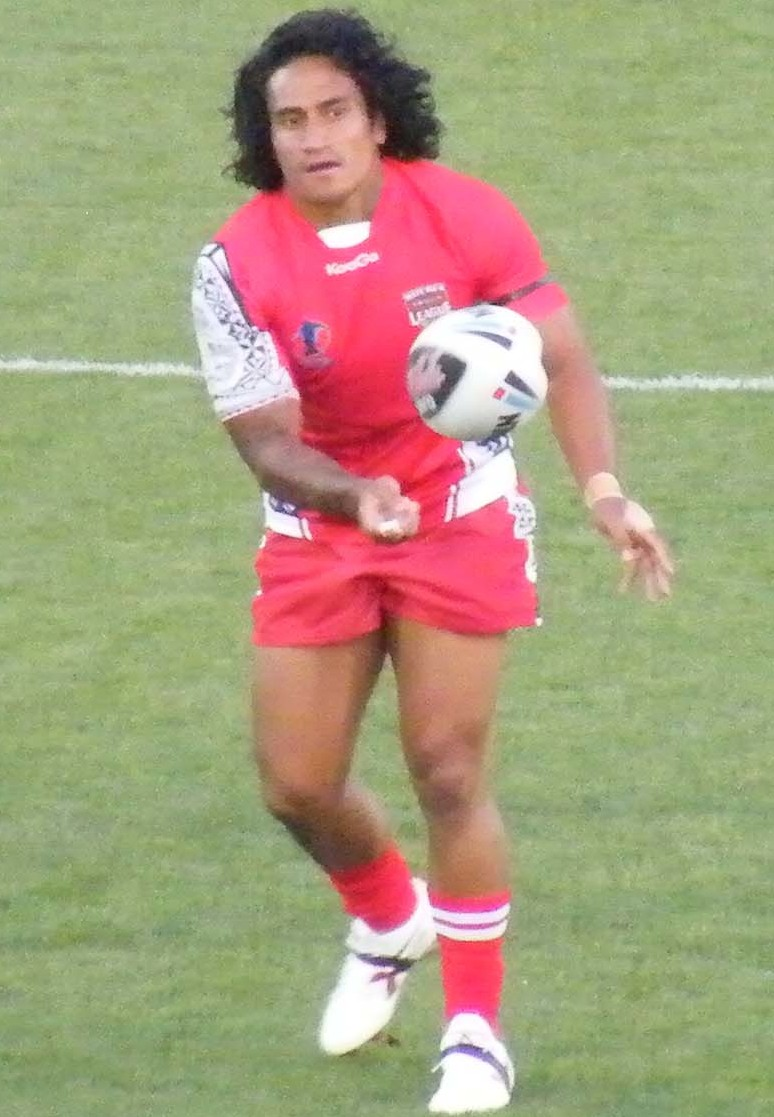

Personal information
- Full name: Tevita Pakai Leo-Latu
- Born: 3 July 1981 (age 45) Auckland, New Zealand
- Height: 173 cm (5 ft 8 in)
- Weight: 88 kg (13 st 12 lb)

Playing information
- Position: Hooker
Club
Years	Team	Pld	T	G	FG	P
2003–05	New Zealand Warriors	22	3	0	0	12
2006	Cronulla Sharks	10	1	0	0	4
2006–10	Wakefield Trinity Wildcats	82	14	0	0	56
2012–22	Point Chevalier Pirates		3			12
	Total	114	21	0	0	84
Representative
Years	Team	Pld	T	G	FG	P
2004	New Zealand	1	0	0	0	0
2008–10	Tonga	3	1	0	0	4
- Source: As of 17 June 2011

Tevita Leo-Latu (born 3 July 1981) is a professional rugby league footballer who plays as a hooker for the Point Chevalier Pirates. He previously played for the New Zealand Warriors and the Cronulla-Sutherland Sharks in the NRL and the Wakefield Trinity Wildcats in the Super League.

== Background ==
Leo-Latu was born in Auckland, New Zealand.

== Childhood and early career ==
Latu began playing rugby league at a young age in Auckland for his local club side Richmond Rovers, though he did not start to seriously contemplate a professional career in league until his late teens when he started playing for the Brothers club in the New Zealand Bartercard Cup competition. It was there where his skills were noticed by the New Zealand Warriors whom immediately signed him up to their playing roster for the beginning of the 2003 season.

== New Zealand Warriors ==
Latu made his début for the New Zealand side coming off the bench during round twelve of the 2003 season against the Cronulla-Sutherland Sharks, a match in which Latu helped his club to a good victory of 23 to 6.

He spent the next two seasons at the club falling both in and out of favour with the team's selectors seeing him make only a further thirteen appearances from 2003 to 2004 for the club after his début.

After some impressive performances for his club during the 2004 season Latu was called up to the New Zealand national rugby league team international side for the middle of the year one-off test match against the Australians. Latu started on the bench eventually coming on to make his international début.

After some loss of form and falling out of favour with the Warriors coaching staff during the 2005 season where he was only given a mere eight appearances, the club decided to release Latu at the completion of the NRL season.

== Cronulla-Sutherland Sharks ==
Tevita signed for the Cronulla-Sutherland Sharks at the beginning of the 2006 season, immediately becoming a regular selection in the Sharks seventeen. He was often used as an interchange hooker often replacing Kevin Kingston on the field for the Sharks adding a much needed attacking spark. Latu played a total of ten games for the club before being involved in an off field assault and subsequently having his contract terminated by the club.

On 23 May 2006 it was reported that Latu had been involved in an altercation in the early hours of the morning before with a 19-year-old woman in Cronulla.

As further details emerged, it was revealed that Latu and the alleged victim Brooke Peninton had both been present at Cronulla's Kingsway BP service station at 3.am. the previous Sunday. Allegedly the two individuals had been in discussion before an altercation arose ending with Latu assaulting Peninton, punching her in the face, resulting in a broken nose and other minor injuries.

Latu was arrested the following day at 11.30 p.m. and charged by police with assault occasioning actual bodily harm. He had been granted police bail to face Sutherland Local Court on 15 June.

Latu had his contract with the Cronulla-Sutherland Sharks terminated as a result of the incident. On Wednesday, 24 May The Sydney Morning Herald announced that the NRL had de-registered Latu as a player, and stated that it would refuse to register him if he signed with another club. Other sporting codes were urged to follow the NRL's lead.

He was sentenced to eight months' periodic detention for his actions but was later reduced to community service after an appeal on 10 July 2006.

== Wakefield Trinity ==
After serving his time, Latu was signed by Super League club Wakefield Trinity Wildcats.

On 7 August 2007 Tevita Leo-Latu received a six-match ban for making a racist remark toward Warrington Wolves' Kevin Penny on 17 June earlier that year.

In August 2008, Leo-Latu was named in the Tonga training squad for the 2008 Rugby League World Cup, and in October 2008 he was named in the final 24-man Tonga squad.

== Later years ==
In 2011 Latu spent the season with the Central Queensland Comets in the Queensland Cup. He returned to New Zealand in 2012 and played for the Point Chevalier Pirates in the Auckland Rugby League competition and the Auckland Vulcans in the NSW Cup. In 2013 he played for the Akarana Falcons in the National Competition. In 2015, while playing for Point Chevalier, he was selected for Auckland.

He was convicted of drink-driving in 2015 and banned from driving for the mandatory minimum of six months.

In 2016, he was named to play for the New Zealand Residents side.
