= Toshio Laiseni =

Tonga international rugby league footballer

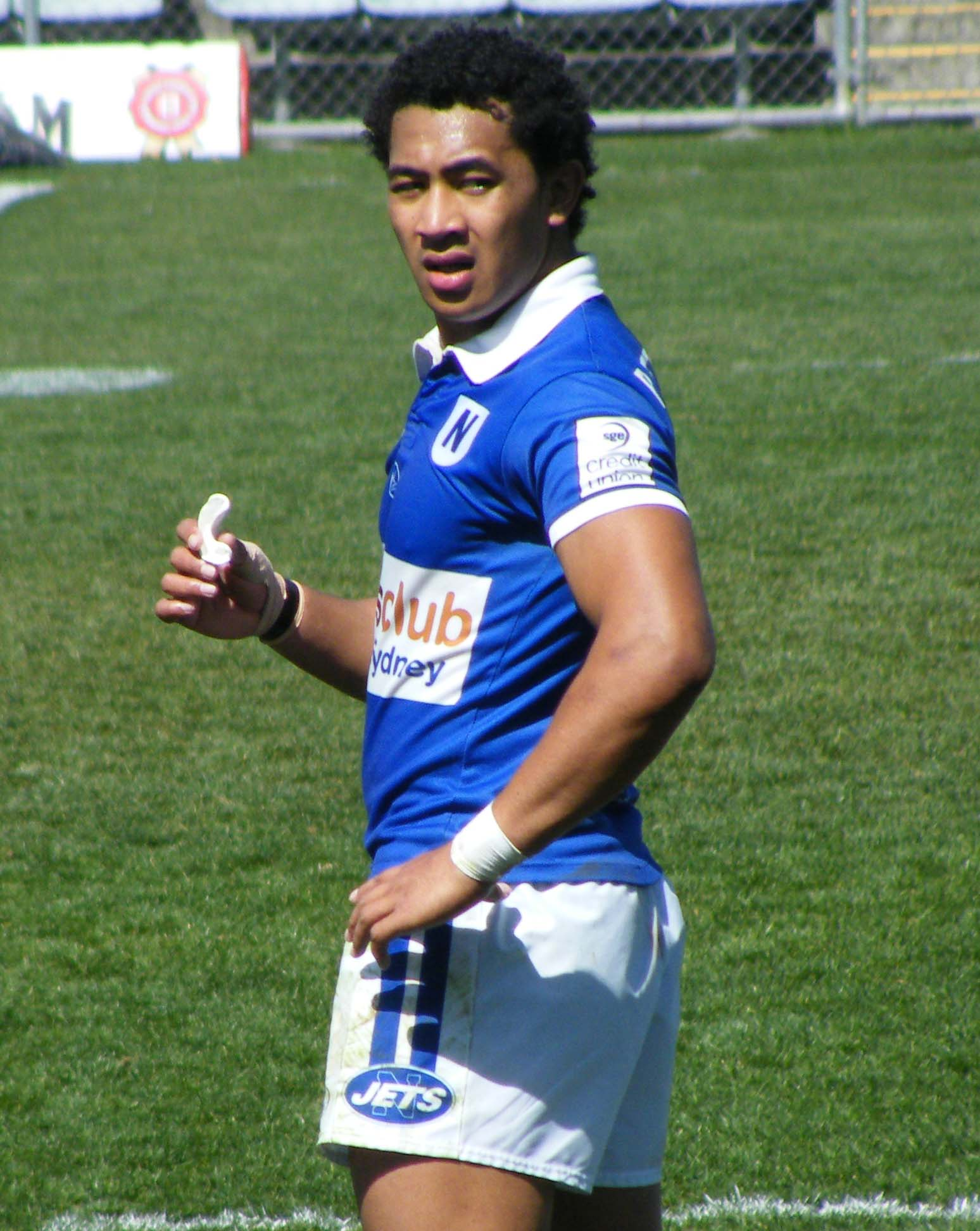
- Toshio Laiseni playing for the Newtown Jets

Personal information
- Full name: Toshio Laiseni
- Born: 19 June 1985 (age 41) Nukuʻalofa, Tonga
- Height: 181 cm (5 ft 11 in)

Playing information
- Position: Fullback, Wing
Club
Years	Team	Pld	T	G	FG	P
2006	Cronulla-Sutherland	1	0	0	0	0
Representative
Years	Team	Pld	T	G	FG	P
2008–09	Tonga	3	0	0	0	0
- Source: As of 21 January 2019

Toshio Laiseni (born 19 June 1985) is a Tongan former professional rugby league footballer who played as fullback or winger.

== Early career ==
Laiseni was born in Nukuʻalofa, Tonga.

Laiseni started his football at the Otahuhu Leopards before being selected to represent the Otahuhu-Ellerslie Leopards in the Bartercard Cup. From this competition he was signed by the New Zealand Warriors although he did not play any NRL matches for the club.

== Playing career ==
=== 2006 ===
Laiseni made his first-grade debut for the Cronulla-Sutherland Sharks in round 18 of the 2006 NRL season on 9 July 2006 at Toyota Park against the Wests Tigers. On his debut, Laiseni played a part in his side's first and only try of the game, making a break and setting up Kevin Kingston to score between the posts. Despite Cronulla losing the match 22-10, Laiseni made a solid beginning to his professional rugby league career.

=== 2007 ===
Laiseni signed with the North Queensland Cowboys for the 2007 season, playing mostly for the Young Guns in the Queensland Cup.

=== 2008 ===
In 2008, he played for Newtown in the NSW Cup.

In August 2008, Laiseni was named in the Tonga training squad for the 2008 Rugby League World Cup, and in October 2008 he was named in the final 24-man Tonga squad.

=== Later years ===
In 2009, Laiseni returned to New Zealand and played for the Papakura Sea Eagles in the 2009 Fox Memorial. He again represented Tonga in a Test against the New Zealand national rugby league team. In 2010 he was part of the Auckland Vulcans squad in the NSW Cup. He later returned to play for his junior club, the Ellerslie Eagles.
