= George Tuakura =

Cook Islands international rugby league player (born 1975)

Personal information
- Born: 11 October 1975 (age 51) Auckland, New Zealand
- Height: 187 cm (6 ft 2 in)
- Weight: 117 kg (18 st 6 lb)

Playing information
- Position: Prop
Club
Years	Team	Pld	T	G	FG	P
2005–07	New Zealand Warriors	1	0	0	0	0
Representative
Years	Team	Pld	T	G	FG	P
2000–06	Cook Islands	4	0	0	0	0
- Source: As of 23 February 2009

George Tuakura (born 11 October 1975) is a former Cook Islands international rugby league footballer who played as a prop in the 2000s and 2010s. He played at representative level Cook Islands, and at club level for the Central Comets in the Queensland Cup,.

== Early years ==
Tuakura was born in South Auckland, New Zealand. He is of Cook Islanders descent.

He first played rugby league for the Mangere East Hawks in the Auckland Rugby League competition.

== Playing career ==
In 2000 he joined the Otahuhu Leopards for the inaugural Bartercard Cup.

In 2004 Tuakura moved to Australia and played for the Central Comets in the Queensland Cup. Tuakura has also spent time playing in France.

== Warriors ==
Tuakura signed a two-year contract with the New Zealand Warriors in 2005. Returning to New Zealand, he played for the Otahuhu Ellerslie Leopards in the Bartercard Cup, hoping to impress the Warriors coaching staff.

In 2006 he was in the 25-man squad for the Warriors. Despite starting several trial games and being named 18th man several times, George managed one appearance for 11 minutes of game time .

== Queensland ==
Tuakura was released by the Warriors after the 2006 season and he returned to the Central Comets. In 2007 he fell out of favour with coach Steve Anderson but made a comeback and returned to the side in 2008. Tuakura maintained his spot in the Comets lineup for the 2009 and 2010 seasons.

== International ==
In 2000 he represented the Cook Islands at the 2000 Rugby League World Cup, playing in all three games.

In 2002 Tuakura toured France and the United States with New Zealand 'A'. He again played for New Zealand 'A' in 2003 when they toured Great Britain.

He again represented the Cook Islands in 2005.

In 2006 he played for the New Zealand Residents in the Trans Tasman Quadrangular Series and also played for the Residents against the New Zealand national rugby league team in a warm up match for the 2006 Rugby League Tri Nations.
