= Ruben Wiki =

New Zealand international rugby league footballer

Ruben Wiki ONZM
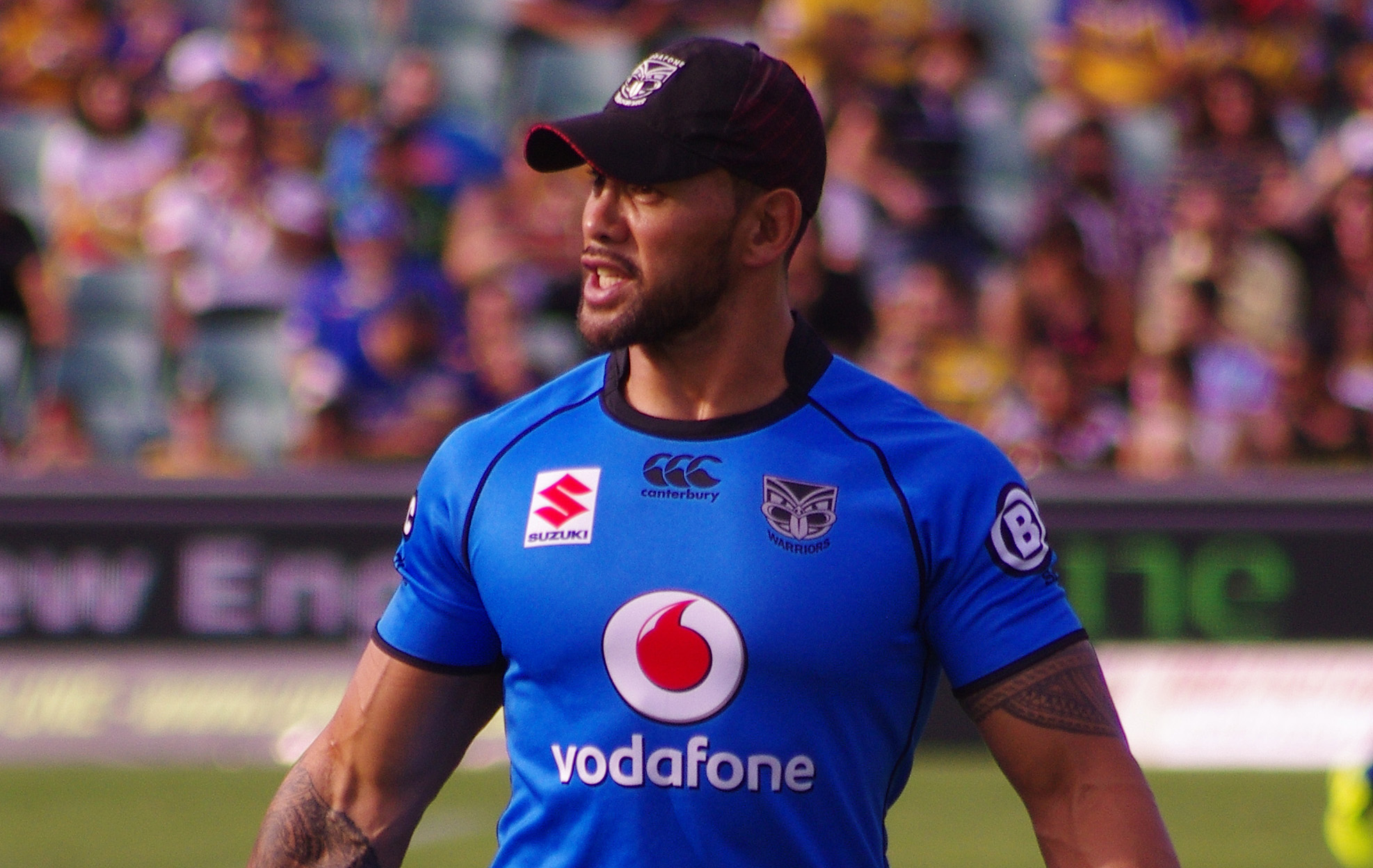

Personal information
- Full name: Ruben James Wiki
- Born: 21 January 1973 (age 53) Auckland, New Zealand

Playing information
- Height: 186 cm (6 ft 1 in)
- Weight: 104 kg (16 st 5 lb)
- Position: Prop, Centre, Second-row
Club
| Years | Team | Pld | T | G | FG | P |
|---|---|---|---|---|---|---|
| 1991–92 | Otahuhu Leopards |
| 1993–04 | Canberra Raiders | 224 | 60 | 0 | 0 | 240 |
| 2005–08 | New Zealand Warriors | 87 | 12 | 0 | 0 | 48 |
| | Total | 311 | 72 | 0 | 0 | 288 |
Representative
| Years | Team | Pld | T | G | FG | P |
| 1993 | Auckland |
| 1992–93 | New Zealand Māori |
| 1994–06 | New Zealand | 55 | 15 | 0 | 0 | 60 |

Ruben James Wiki ONZM (born 21 January 1973) is a New Zealand former professional rugby league footballer who played in the 1990s and 2000s. A New Zealand international representative centre-turned-prop forward, he retired with the record for most international appearances of any rugby league player in history. As of 2023, he is still the highest capped Kiwi player ever. At club level Wiki played for the Canberra Raiders, winning the 1994 NSWRL Premiership with them before finishing his career with the New Zealand Warriors. He currently works as the NZRL's High Performance Manager and a High Performance Assistant with the New Zealand Warriors.

== Background ==
Of Samoan and Māori heritage, Wiki was an Otahuhu Leopards junior. Alongside future All Black captain Tana Umaga, Wiki wreaked havoc for the Junior Kiwis in 1992. He represented the New Zealand Māori side in 1992 and 1993, playing on the wing at the 1992 Pacific Cup.

== Professional playing career ==
=== 1990s ===
Wiki commenced playing in Australia's Winfield Cup for the Canberra Raiders' first grade side in the 1993 NSWRFL season. In 1993 he played for Auckland.

In 1994, he teamed up with Mal Meninga as centre to score a premiership win for the Canberra Raiders. He was then involved in controversy when both the Canberra Raiders and new Auckland Warriors tried to register him for the 1995 season. After a long dispute Wiki stayed with Canberra. Wiki was selected for the New Zealand team to compete in the end of season 1999 Rugby League Tri-Nations tournament. In the final against Australia he played at centre in the Kiwis' 22–20 loss.

=== 2000s ===
In 2001 Wiki was banned for two matches after pleading guilty to a dangerous throw charge on Sydney prop Scott Logan. Wiki played for Canberra until 2004 before moving to the Warriors.

Wiki joined the New Zealand Warriors in 2005. Wiki will probably be remembered most as the captain of the Kiwi team that scored an historic 24–0 victory over the Kangaroos in the 2005 Tri-nations. This was the first series win since 1978 and the first time in 20 years that New Zealand had kept Australia scoreless in a test match. In the final Wiki was named man-of-the-match and became the first player of any nation to reach fifty test caps. After playing his 55th test match in the 2006 Tri Nations final Ruben Wiki announced his retirement from the international game along with other New Zealand veterans Nigel Vagana and Stacey Jones. New Zealand lost the final in golden point extra time 12–16 after the scores were locked at 12-all after 80 minutes. Wiki retired having played 55 test matches for New Zealand between 1994 and 2006, at the time the most test matches played by any rugby league footballer in the world. He captained the New Zealand national rugby league team in 18 of those tests. Wiki's biography, Ruben Wiki, was published in 2006. He became only the tenth player and first New Zealander to play 300 first grade games in the NRL when he started at prop in the Warriors 28–26 victory against the Wests Tigers on 29 June 2008. He played, what was meant to be his final game with the All Golds as part of the 2008 Rugby League World Cup against the New Zealand Māori rugby league team. Later that year he was an assistant to the New Zealand team which won the Rugby League World Cup. Wiki snubbed the chance to join a Super League side for the 2009 season, and entered into retirement from first grade rugby league in 2008.

In 2009 Wiki came out of retirement to play for the Samoan Residents, a team representing his Mother's homeland, in a one-off match which raised money for the Samoan tsunami relief fund.

=== Highlights ===
- 2017 - Played for the New Zealand Warriors in the Auckland Nines Tournament at the age of 44
- 2008 – New Zealand Warriors upsetting minor premiers the Melbourne Storm 18–15 in what was the first time an 8th placed team had defeated the 1st placed since 1999.
- 2008 – First New Zealander to reach 300 first grade NRL games
- 2008 – The oldest player in the NRL at 35 years and 250 days.
- 55 test caps for Kiwis 1994–2006 before retiring from representative football
- 18 tests as Kiwi captain 2003–2006
- 2006 – Set a record for the most first grade NRL games by a New Zealander, surpassing Stephen Kearney's mark of 264 games.
- 2005 – Was awarded man of the match in his 50th test for the Kiwis. In the same match he also became the first player ever to receive 50 test caps for their country. New Zealand won this historic test against Australia 24–0 and consequently beat Australia for the first time in a series since 1953.
- 1994 – Won a premiership with the Canberra Raiders club.
- First Grade Debut: Round 11, Canberra v South Sydney at Canberra Stadium, 13 June 1993

== Post playing ==
In August 2009, Wiki appeared on the New Zealand travel programme Intrepid Journeys with a trip to Laos. In 2010 Wiki took up a role as a High Performance Assistant with the Warriors. On 22 January Wiki was named the New Zealand Rugby League's national High Performance Manager, a role which will ensure he is involved with the New Zealand national rugby league team. Since 2008, he opened a youth gym back in Otahuhu, Auckland.

In 2023, Wiki participated in season 3 of Match Fit, where former rugby players return to play against the Australian counterparts. He joined in the first season that featured former rugby league stars. He was the assistant coach for the team, and became an emergency substitute player against NZ Women's Open Tag team. He was also named on the bench and played as a substitute against Kangaroos due to Shontayne Hape and Henry Fa'afili deemed medically ineligible to play contact rugby.

In 2024, Wiki returned in season 4 of Match Fit: Union vs. League as a technical coach to teach the rules of rugby league to the rugby union players. He also became a player for the final game against the combined Wallabies and Kangaroos alumni team.

== Honours ==
In 2002 and 2003 Wiki was named the Canberra Raiders' player of the year. In 2006, he was named in a Kiwi All Time XIII at a gala awards dinner celebrating New Zealand's centenary of rugby league alongside his good friend Stacey Jones. Wiki and Jones are the only recent players to be named in the side with the majority of the players being from the "immortal" 1950-60s side and the destructive 1980s team.

Wiki was appointed an Officer of the New Zealand Order of Merit, for services to rugby league, in the 2007 Queen's Birthday Honours.

== Personal life ==
Wiki drank a bowl of the Pacific island drink kava after each match, which he credits for his longevity in the game. This became not only a personal ritual but was embraced by the team as a post match tradition.

His sister, Germaine Wiki, has represented the Kiwi Ferns.

He is married with two children, including daughter Mackenzie who represents Cook Islands in rugby league and from 2023 plays for the Canberra Raiders NRLW team.

| Preceded by Paul Rauhihi | New Zealand national rugby league team captain 2005–2007 | Succeeded by Roy Asotasi |
