= Herewini Rangi =

NZ rugby league footballer & coach

Personal information
- Born: 14 May 1984 (age 42) Huntly, New Zealand

Playing information
- Position: Hooker
Club
Years	Team	Pld	T	G	FG	P
2004	New Zealand Warriors	1	0	0	0	0
Representative
Years	Team	Pld	T	G	FG	P
2004	NZ Māori	1	0	0	0	0

Herewini Rangi is a New Zealand rugby league coach and former player who played one match in the NRL. He played as a hooker or lock, who could also kick goals.

== Early years ==
Rangi grew up in Huntly and played for the Taniwharau Rugby League Club. In 2001 he played for the Waikato Under-17s and also made the National U-17 team. He made the Junior Kiwis in 2002, playing both games.

== Playing career ==
Rangi joined the New Zealand Warriors 25-man squad for 2004, moving to Auckland. The club assigned him to play for the Eastern Tornadoes in the Bartercard Cup. He played only one NRL game for the Warriors, against the Canberra Raiders. However, he was named Clubman of the Year at the end of season awards dinner. In 2004 he was also the leading scorer for the Tornadoes with 62 points and represented Auckland.

In 2005 he travelled across the Tasman to join the Central Comets in the Queensland Cup. He moved to the Wynnum Manly Seagulls in 2007, playing five Queensland Cup games and also representing the FOGS Cup team.

In Round one of the 2008 FOGS Cup Herewini suffered a serious spinal injury when he collided with the goal post. It was originally feared he may have suffered permanent damage but this was later downgraded when he began to regain feeling in his arms and legs. He was still expected to require at least six months in hospital, but was released in May and returned to New Zealand.

== Later years ==
In 2011 Rangi is coached the Taniwharau side in the Waicoa Bay competition. In 2012 he coached the Gisborne Tairawhiti team and was appointed the Gisborne KiwiSport Officer.
