= Marist Richmond Brothers =

Club information
- Founded: 2000
- Exited: 2005

Former details
- Grounds: Grey Lynn Park; Murray Halberg Park
- Competition: Auckland Rugby League

Records
- Runners-up: 2003, 2004
- Minor premierships: 2004

The Marist Richmond Brothers were a New Zealand rugby league franchise that played in the Bartercard Cup. They were a joint venture between two Auckland Rugby League clubs, the Richmond Bulldogs and the Marist Saints. In 2005 the competition was reorganised and the club, along with the Mt Albert Lions, formed the Auckland Lions. Despite this many former players and the coach instead became involved in the Waitakere Rangers franchise.

== Notable players ==
Notable players included: Motu Tony, Misi Taulapapa, Karl Guttenbeil, Marcus Perenara, Tevita Latu, Steve Matai, Jerome Ropati, Paletasala Ale, Evarn Tuimavave, Saia Makisi, Daniel Vasau, Vae Kalolo and Tangi Ropati.

== Results ==
The Brothers started the competition poorly, missing the playoffs in the first two years. However they turned things around for 2002 and made the playoffs for the first time. In 2003 they finished third on the table but then went on the qualify for the Grand Final, losing to the Canterbury Bulls. They dominated in 2004, claiming the Minor Premiership but went down to the Mt Albert Lions in the finals. They again missed the playoffs in 2005, their final season in the competition.

Season	Pld	W	D	L	PF	PA	PD	Pts	Position (Teams)	Finals
2000	22	9	0	13	558	707	-149	18	Ninth (Twelve))	N/A
2001	21	8	2	11	675	595	80	20*	Eighth (Twelve)	N/A
2002	16	9	1	6	581	449	132	19	Fifth (Twelve)	Lost Elimination Semifinal
2003	16	12	1	3	627	406	221	25	Third (Twelve)	Lost Grand Final
2004	16	13	1	2	500	306	194	27	Minor Premiers (Twelve)	Lost Grand Final
2005	16	8	2	6	399	387	12	18	Seventh (Twelve)	N/A

*Two points for a bye awarded as the Ngongotaha Chiefs left the competition.
