= Charlie Herekotukutuku =

New Zealand rugby league footballer

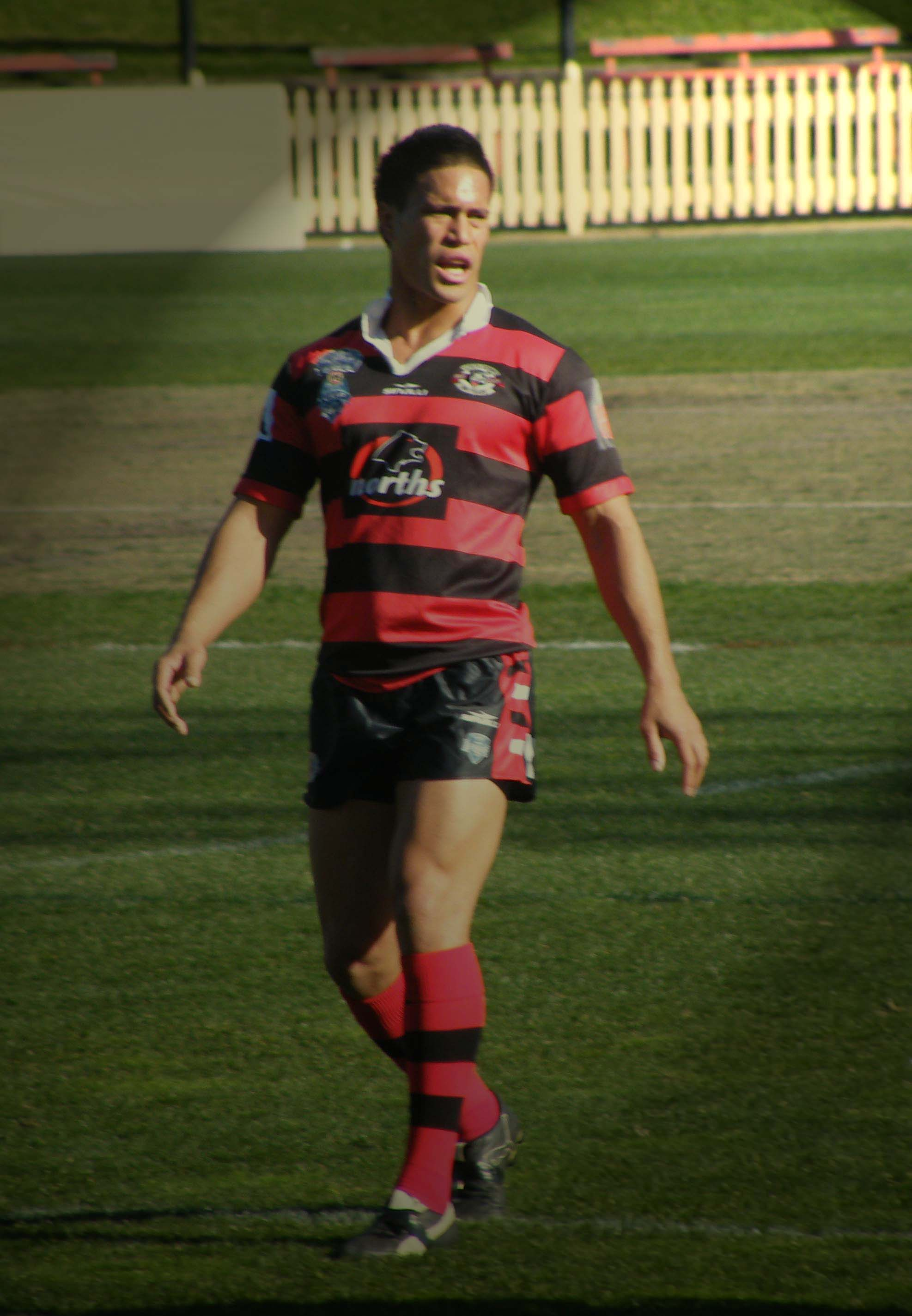
- Herekotukutuku playing for North Sydney

Personal information
- Born: New Zealand
- Height: 1.76 m (5 ft 9 1/2 in)
- Weight: 83 kg (13 st 1 lb)

Playing information
- Position: Fullback, Five-eighth, Halfback
Representative
| Years | Team | Pld | T | G | FG | P |
|---|---|---|---|---|---|---|
| 2004 | New Zealand Māori | 3 | 0 | 0 | 0 | 0 |
- As of 23 February 2010

Charlie Herekotukutuku (birth unknown) is a New Zealand rugby league footballer who played for the Balmain Ryde Eastwood Tigers in the New South Wales Cup and the Mount Pritchard Mounties in the Bundaberg Red Cup. He plays as a five-eighth, half-back or hooker and is a recognised goal-kicker. He was a New Zealand Māori international.

Herekotukutuku has previously played for the Canterbury Bulls, Western Suburbs, North Sydney Bears, Newtown Jets and was affiliated with the South Sydney Rabbitohs. He was selected in the NSW Residents representative team in 2008.
