= Northcote Tigers =

NZ rugby league club, based in Northcote

Club information
- Full name: Northcote and Birkenhead Tigers Rugby League and Sports Club Inc
- Colours: Gold and black
- Founded: 1910 as the Northcote Warriors

Current details
- Ground: Birkenhead War Memorial
- Coach: David Bhana
- Competition: Auckland Rugby League

Records
- Premierships: 1987, 1989, 1991, 1992, 1993, 1994, 2001
- Minor premierships: 1989, 1990, 1991, 1993
- National Club Champions: 1987, 1989, 1991
- Roope Rooster: 1988, 1991, 1992, 1993, 2008, 2009
- Stormont Shield: 1989, 1990, 1991, 1992
- Sharman Cup: 1979, 2003, 2007, 2022, 2024

The Northcote Tigers are a rugby league club based in Northcote, New Zealand. The club was founded in 1910 as the Northcote Warriors though they became known as the Northcote Ramblers shortly afterwards.

The Tigers compete in the Fox Memorial competition run by the Auckland Rugby League. Between 2000 and 2002 the Northcote Tigers competed in the national Bartercard Cup before being replaced by the North Harbour Tigers for three seasons. In 1994–1996 the North Harbour Sea Eagles in the Lion Red Cup were also based at the Birkenhead War Memorial. 1 1

== History ==
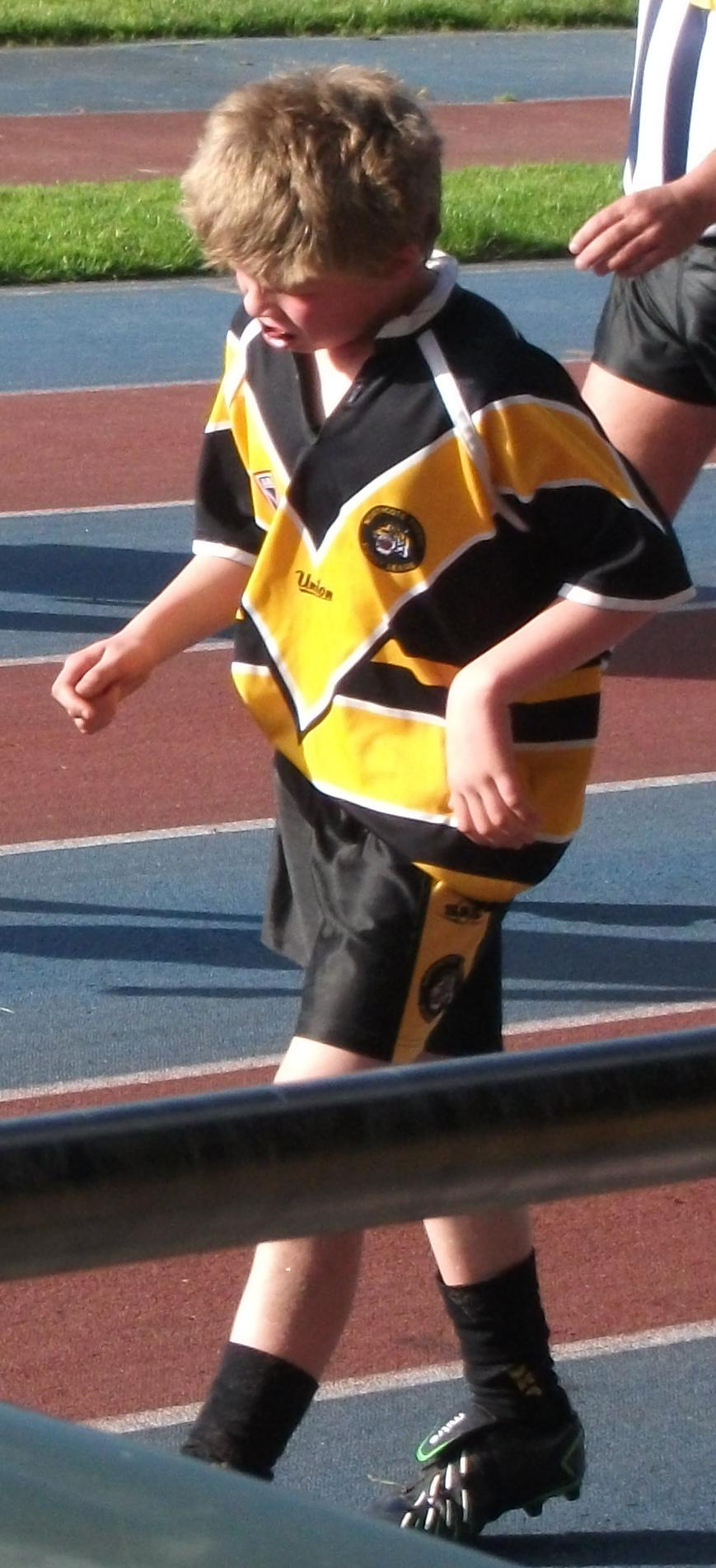
The Northcote Tigers jersey

In 1909 some members of the North Shore rugby were so impressed with the new type of football they had seen that they decided to found a club for the 1910 season. Thus in 1910 the Northcote "Ramblers" League Football Club was born. It wasn't until 1948 however that the club qualified for the first grade and earned 'senior' status. In 1987 they finally won the Fox Memorial championship, under the coaching of Graeme Birch.

== Notable players ==
Players for the Tigers have included Gary Freeman, Sean Hoppe, Jason Lowrie, Gene Ngamu, Paul Rauhihi, Tony Tuimavave and former New Zealand Warrior Kevin Locke.

=== 1Kiwi representatives ===
Thirteen players have played for the New Zealand national rugby league team:

- Tom Conroy: 1975
- Gary Freeman: 1986–92, 1994–95
- Tom Hadfield: 1956-61
- Frank Halloran*: 1937
- Sean Hoppe: 1992–99, 2002
- Len Jordan: 1946-49
- Josh Liavaa: 1975
- Jason Lowrie: 1993–95, 1999-2000
- Gene Ngamu: 1993-99
- John O'Sullivan: 1971–72, 1974–75
- Paul Rauhihi: 2002-04
- Paddy Tuimavave: 1990
- Tony Tuimavave: 1995
- Alex Glenn: 2012
- Kevin Locke: 2011
- Keano Kini 2024

Frank Halloran had transferred to the Ponsonby club at the start of the 1934 season.

The club has also had many Auckland representatives, including Shane Horo, Stuart Galbraith, Brian McLennan, Logan Campbell, Latham Tawhai, Mark Elia, Ken McIntosh, and Willie Poching.

== Bartercard Cup ==
With the creation of the Bartercard Cup in 2000 by the New Zealand Rugby League the Tigers were one of the seven Auckland sides invited to join. However they did not experience that much success, failing to make the top five in three successive attempts.

Season	Pld	W	D	L	PF	PA	PD	Pts	Position (teams)	Finals
2000	22	7	1	14	490	654	−164	15	Tenth (Twelve)	N/A
2001	21	10	1	10	566	508	58	23*	Seventh (Twelve)	N/A
2002	16	8	0	8	401	472	−71	16	Seventh (Twelve)	N/A

*two points for a Bye as the Ngongotaha Chiefs dropped out of the competition.

=== North Harbour Tigers ===
In 2003 the Bartercard Cup Franchise was renamed the North Harbour Tigers. The new side represented all of the North Shore teams and not just the Northcote club. It experienced some success in its three-year history, making the top five twice, both times losing in the Elimination Semi-final.

Season	Pld	W	D	L	PF	PA	PD	Pts	Position (teams)	Finals
2003	16	6	2	8	496	403	93	14	Sixth (Twelve)	N/A
2004	16	9	1	6	469	374	95	19	Fourth (Twelve)	Lost Elimination Semi-final
2005	16	10	0	6	508	323	185	20	Fourth (Twelve)	Lost Elimination Semi-final

=== Harbour League ===
In 2006 the number of Auckland Bartercard Cup sides was reduced from eight to five. This resulted in the North Harbour Tigers and the Hibiscus Coast Raiders leaving the competition and being replaced by the Harbour League franchise.

== Northcote and Birkenhead Senior Team Records 1910-1943, 1990, 1992-94, 2022 ==
The season record for the most senior men's team in the club.

Season	Grade	Name	Play	W	D	L	PF	PA	PD	Pts	Position (Teams)
1910	2nd Grade	Northcote & Birkenhead Ramblers	7	7	0	0	112	18	94	14	1st of 4
1911	2nd Grade	Northcote & Birkenhead Ramblers	7	7	0	0	64	35	29	14	1st of 4 (record incomplete)
1912	2nd Grade	Northcote & Birkenhead Ramblers	9	4	0	5	8	27	-19	8	Approximately 4th of 8, full results unknown.
1913	2nd Grade	Northcote & Bikenhead Ramblers	7	2	0	5	40	41	-1	4	Approximately 4th of 7, full results unknown.
1914	2nd Grade	Northcote & Birkenhead Ramblers	10	9	0	1	102	53	49	18	1st of 7 (score in R2 win over Otahuhu not reported)
1915	2nd Grade	Northcote & Birkenhead Ramblers	4	0	0	4	17	65	-48	0	8th of 8, withdrew after 5 rounds.
1916	4th Grade	Northcote & Birkenhead Ramblers B	6	0	0	6	15	89	-74	0	7th of 8 (Two sides were fielded, finishing last and second to last)
1917	3rd Grade	Northcote & Birkenhead Ramblers	5	0	0	5	8	83	-75	0	5th of 6, full results unknown
1918	3rd Grade	Northcote & Birkenhead Ramblers	5	0	0	5	25	52	-27	0	Approximately 4th of 5, full results unknown
1919	4th Grade	Northcote & Birkenhead Ramblers	4	0	1	3	0	0	0	1	Results unknown (6 teams)
1920	2nd Grade	Northcote & Birkenhead Ramblers	5	3	0	2	55	31	24	6	Approximately 4th of 10, full results unknown
1921	5th Grade	Northcote & Birkenhead Ramblers	2	0	0	2	8	21	-13	0	Approximately 7th of 10, full results unknown
1922	2nd Grade	Northcote & Birkenhead Ramblers	6	0	0	6	16	57	-41	0	Approximately 10th of 13, full results unknown
1923	2nd Grade	Northcote & Birkenhead Ramblers	2	0	0	2	0	0	0	0	12th of 12, withdrew early in the season after defaults
1924	5th Grade	Northcote & Birkenhead Ramblers	6	2	1	3	28	66	-38	5	Approximately 8th of 11
1925	B Division	Northcote & Birkenhead Ramblers	11	3	0	8	75	126	-51	6	5th of 5
1926	B Division	Northcote & Birkenhead Ramblers	14	10	1	3	166	139	27	21	1st of 6
1927	B Division	Northcote & Birkenhead Ramblers	13	7	0	6	74	66	8	14	3rd of 7
1928	B Division	Northcote & Birkenhead Ramblers	12	1	0	11	52	168	-116	2	7th of 8
1929	B Division	Northcote & Birkenhead Ramblers	9	5	0	4	66	77	-11	10	3rd of 6
1930	B Division	Northcote & Birkenhead Ramblers	12	4	0	8	67	92	-25	8	5th of 7
1931	2nd Grade	Northcote & Birkenhead Ramblers	15	4	2	4	81	58	23	10	Approximately 4th of 8
1932	2nd Grade	Northcote & Birkenhead Ramblers	16	11	0	4	62	77	-15	22	Approximately 3rd of 9
1933	3rd Grade Interim. (Walker Cup)	Northcote & Birkenhead Ramblers	15	14	1	0	346	6	340	29	1st of 10 (won championship and Murray Cup for the KO championship beating Marist 6–3).
1934	3rd Grade Interim. (Walker Cup)	Northcote & Birkenhead Ramblers	17	6	1	10	14	35	-21	19	8th of 13
1935	3rd Grade (Walker Cup)	Northcote & Birkenhead Ramblers	13	1	1	8	57	110	-53	3	11th of 14
1936	3rd Grade	Northcote & Birkenhead Ramblers	-	-	-	-	-	-	-	-	Results unknown (17 teams)
1937	Senior B (Sharman Cup)	Northcote & Birkenhead Ramblers	13	6	0	7	35	75	-40	12	5th of 9
1938	Senior B (Sharman Cup)	Northcote & Birkenhead Ramblers	11	3	0	8	62	66	-4	4	5th of 6
1939	Senior B (Sharman Cup)	Northcote & Birkenhead Ramblers	6	1	0	5	23	100	-77	2	6th of 6
1940	Senior B (Sharman Cup)	Northcote & Birkenhead Ramblers	5	2	0	3	44	41	3	4	Several results unknown (6 teams)
1941	Senior B (Sharman Cup)	Northcote & Birkenhead Ramblers	3	2	0	1	23	17	6	4	Several results unknown (11 teams)
1942	Unknown	Northcote & Birkenhead Ramblers	-	-	-	-	-	-	-	-	No draws published or results reported below Fox competition
1943	Unknown	Northcote & Birkenhead Ramblers	-	-	-	-	-	-	-	-	No draws published or results reported below Fox competition
1990	Lion Red Premiership Div 1	Northcote Tigers	21	17	0	4	493	299	164.9%	34	1st of 8
	Playoffs	Northcote Tigers	2	0	0	2	20	22	-	-	L v Te Atatū 20–22 in SF, L v Ōtāhuhu in major SF
1992	Lion Red Premiership Div 1	Northcote Tigers	18	12	1	5	517	253	204.3%	25	4th of 10
	Playoffs	Northcote Tigers	3	3	0	0	16	11	-	-	W v Richmond in SF, W v Te Atatū in SF, W 16-11 v Mt Albert in the GF
1993	Lion Red Premiership Div 1	Northcote Tigers	18	15	0	3	419	305	137.4%	30	1st of 10
	Playoffs	Northcote Tigers	2	2	0	0	47	22	-	-	W v Richmond, W v Te Atatū, W v Mt Albert 16–11 in GF
1994	Lion Red Premiership Div 1	Northcote Tigers	22	13	2	7	516	476	108.4%	28	3rd of 12
	Playoffs	Northcote Tigers	3	3	0	0	73	32	-	-	W v Hibiscus Coast 21–10, W v Ōtāhuhu 20–10, W v Ōtāhuhu 32–12 in the GF
2020	1st Grade (Fox Memorial)	Northcote Tigers	8	7	0	1	212	116	182.8%	14	3rd of 10 (season cancelled -covid)
2021	1st Grade (Fox Memorial)	Northcote Tigers	11	2	0	9	170	442	38.46%	4	11th of 12 in phase 1
2022	1st Grade (Fox Memorial)	Northcote Tigers	8	3	0	5	170	222	76.58%	6	7th of 9 in section 1
	Sharman Cup playoffs	Northcote Tigers	3	3	0	0	108	50	-	-	W v Manurewa 28–18 in PF, W v Ponsonby 48–4 in SF, W v Pakuranga 32–28 in GF
1910-1943, 1990, 1992–94, 2022	TOTAL		501	265	15	206	7712	6307	-	531	
