= Mount Albert Lions =

NZ rugby league club, based in Auckland

Club information
- Full name: Mount Albert Rugby League
- Founded: 1928

Current details
- Ground: Fowlds Park
- Coach: Trent Wallace
- Competition: Auckland Rugby League

Records
- Premierships: 1939, 1947, 1950, 1951, 1968, 1969, 1981, 1982, 1984, 1985, 1986, 2004, 2006, 2008, 2009, 2012
- Minor premierships: 1950, 1951, 1953, 1954, 1970, 1981, 1983, 1992, 2006, 2012
- Bartercard Cup: 2002, 2004, 2005
- National Club Champions: 1984, 1986
- Stormont Shield: 1939, 1947, 1948, 1964, 1969, 1970, 1981, 1985, 1987, 1993
- Sharman Cup: 1980

The Mount Albert Lions are a rugby league club based in Mount Albert, New Zealand that plays in the Auckland Rugby League. The Lions’ home ground is at Fowlds Park. Their patron is Helen Clark, a former Prime Minister of New Zealand. In 2008 and 2009 the Lions won the Fox Memorial.

As of 2025 the team is coached by Trent Wallace.

== History ==
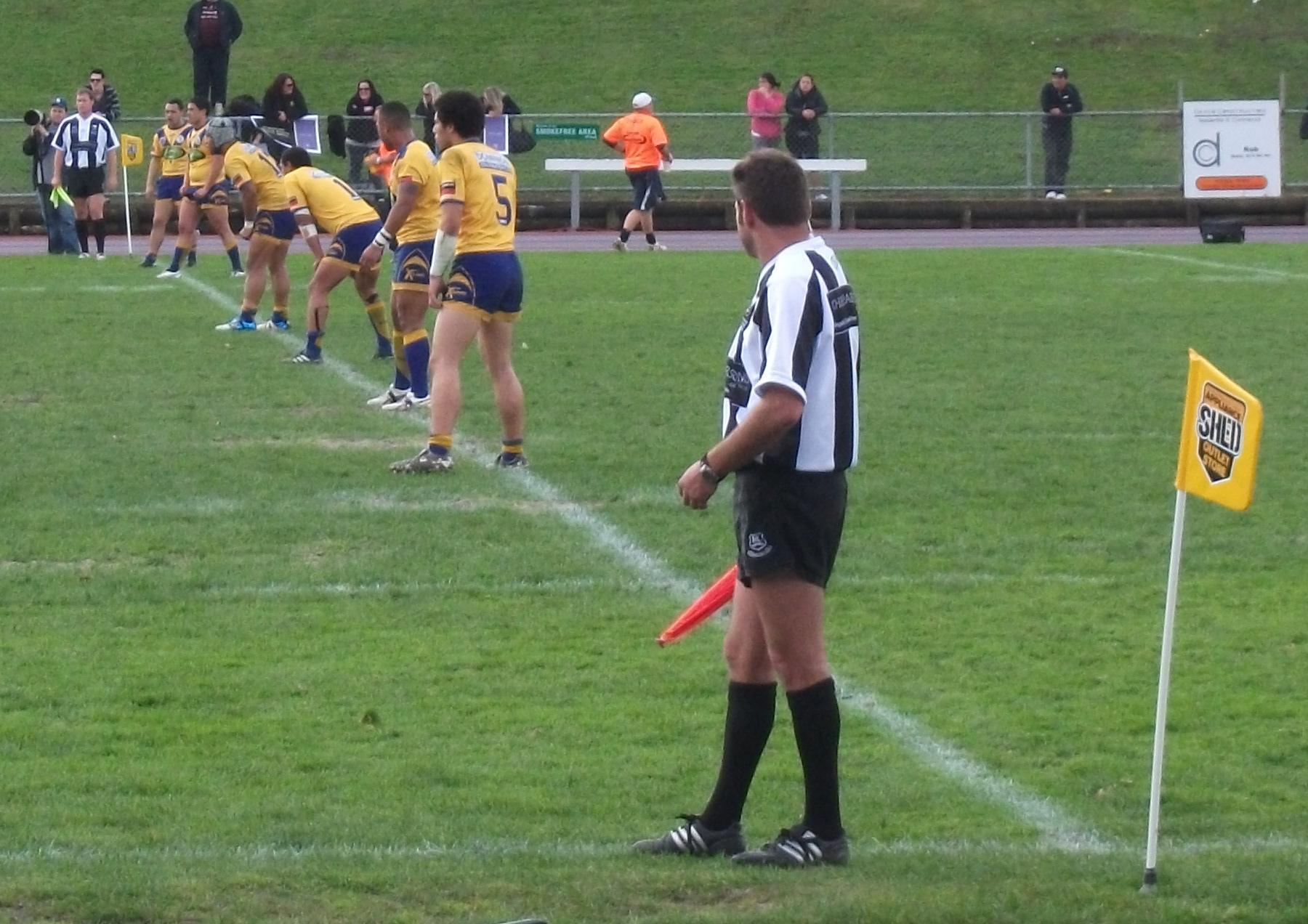
Mt Albert kick off in the 2010 grand final

The club was founded in 1928, after a meeting was held in April of that year. They fielded teams in the 3rd and 4th grades. In the early 1930s the club moved to its current location at Fowlds Park in Morningside. In their initial seasons they had trained on Springleigh Avenue at what is now Phyllis Street Reserve. Up until 1934 the club had played in mauve colours but in April of that year they applied to the junior management committee to change their club colours to blue and gold. They gained senior status from the Auckland Rugby League in 1935.

The club has won the Fox Memorial trophy fifteen times; in 1939, 1947, 1950, 1951, 1968, 1969, 1981, 1982, 1984, 1985, 1986, 2004, 2006, 2008 and 2009. In 1984 the Lions won the National Club Competition and in 2002, 2004 and 2005 they won the Bartercard Cup.

=== 2000s ===
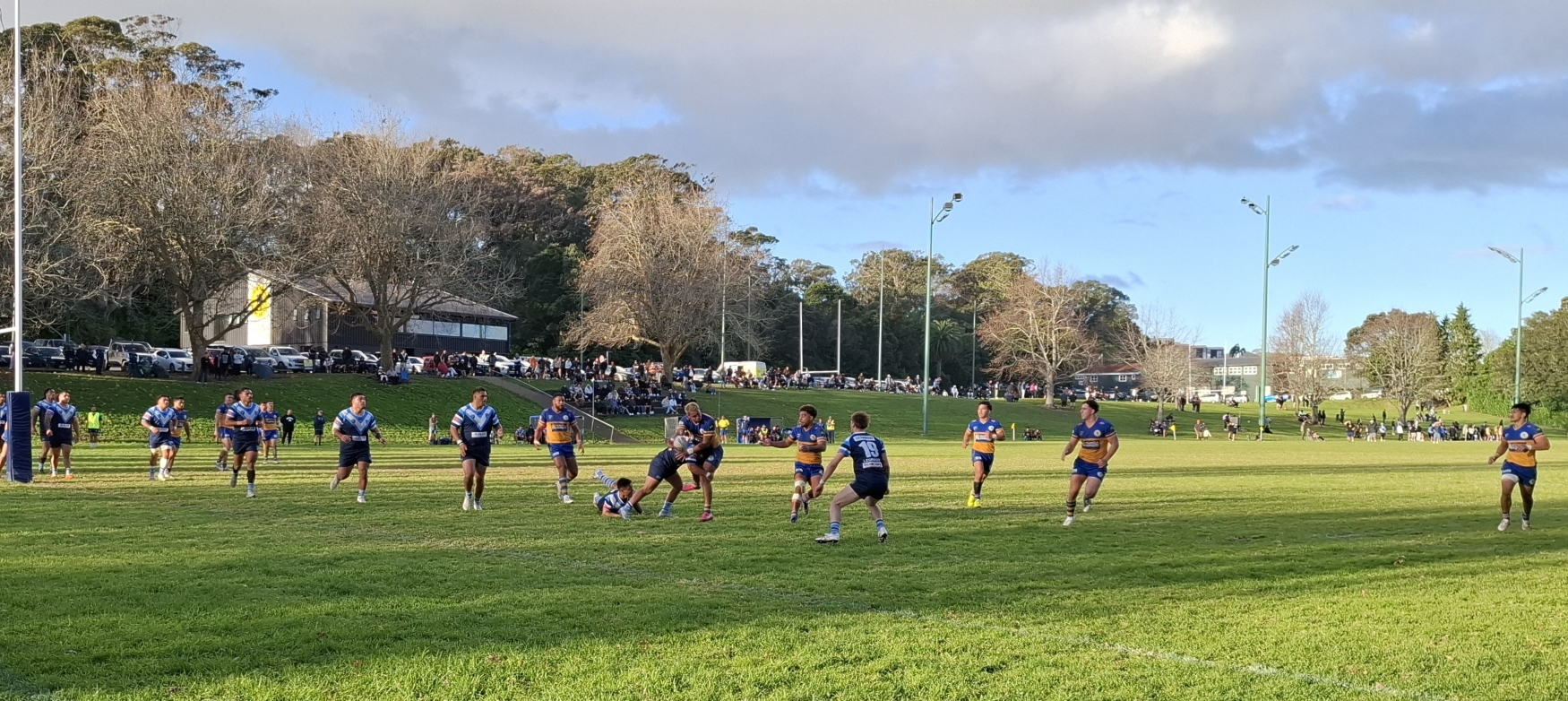
Mt Albert v Otahuhu, June 21, 2025 in their Roope Rooster loss.

In 2006 the Lions defended the Roope Rooster Challenge trophy in all eleven of their games and went on to win the Fox Memorial. In early 2007 they lost the trophy to the Te Atatu Roosters. In 2025 they won the Roope Rooster from Ponsonby Ponies at Victoria Park before losing it weeks later to Otahuhu Leopards.

== Notable players ==
=== New Zealanders ===
- Des Herring (1938)
- Clarry McNeil (1938)
- Bob Banham (1939)
- Bunty Afoa
- Bert Leatherbarrow (1939)
- Arthur McInnarney (1939)
- Moses Leota
- Ray Cranch (1951)
- Don Hammond (1959)
- Ray Wilson (1969)
- Richard Bolton (1972)
- John Ackland (1983)
- Shane Cooper (1985)

=== Australians ===
- Nathan Cleary

=== Other NZ representatives ===
Players who represented New Zealand before or after playing for Mt Albert.

- Gordon Campbell
- Claude List
- Wilf Hassan
- Roy Hardgrave
- Cliff Satherley
- Ted Mincham

=== Auckland Representatives (1935-1945) ===
- Des Herring (1935-1939)
- Robert Morrissey (1936)
- Clarrie Petersen (1936)
- Joseph Gunning (1937-1939)
- Bert Leatherbarrow (1937)
- William McCallum (1937)
- Clarry McNeil (1938)
- Richard Shadbolt (1938-1945)
- Walter Cameron (1939)
- Bruce Donaldson (1939)
- Bill Walker (1939)
- Jack Tristram (1941)
- Les Clement (1944-1945)
- Ivan Sumich (1944)
- Bob Borich (1945)
- Alan Wiles (1945)
- Selwyn Thomassen (1945)

=== Bartercard Cup ===
Between 2000 and 2005 the Lions competed in the national Bartercard Cup competition. Under the guidance of Brian McClennan they were the most successful club in the competition's history, being champions three times and twice winning the minor premiership. However the club had a slow start to the competition, not making the playoffs in the first two years. Their place in the Bartercard Cup was taken over by the Auckland Lions, an entity which represented Mount Albert as well as other neighbouring clubs. In 2007 the Auckland Lions also competed in the NSWRL Premier League but they were replaced in 2008 by the Auckland Vulcans.

Season	Pld	W	D	L	PF	PA	PD	Pts	Position (Teams)	Finals
2000	22	12	1	9	593	584	9	25	Sixth (Twelve)	N/A
2001	21	8	0	13	414	630	-216	18*	Tenth (Twelve)	N/A
2002	16	15	0	1	620	270	350	30	Minor Premiers (Twelve)	Champions
2003	16	13	0	3	530	328	202	26	Second (Twelve)	Defeated in Preliminary Final
2004	16	12	0	4	522	378	144	24	Third (Twelve)	Champions
2005	16	12	0	4	570	326	244	24	Minor Premiers (Twelve)	Champions

*Two points for a Bye as the Ngongotaha Chiefs withdrew from the competition

== Mount Albert Senior Team Records (1928-1944) & (2022-26) ==
The season record for the most senior men’s team in the club.

Season	Grade	Name	Play	W	D	L	PF	PA	PD	Pts	Finishing position & notes
1928	3rd Grade	Mount Albert United	15	11	1	3	148	31	117	23	2nd of 14
1929	2nd Grade	Mount Albert United	12	10	0	2	141	37	+104	20	2nd of 7
1930	B Grade	Mount Albert United	11	4	1	6	82	101	-19	2	3rd of 7
1931	2nd Grade	Mount Albert United	15	11	0	4	128	26	102	22	2nd of 8
1932	2nd Grade	Mount Albert United	16	8	1	5	96	52	44	17	4th of 9, lost Ko final 15-18 to Māngere United
1933	2nd Grade	Mount Albert United	12	4	1	7	56	105	-49	9	5th of 7
1934	2nd Grade	Mount Albert United	14	6	1	7	81	96	-15	13	3rd of 6, lost semi final of KO competition 5-13 to Papakura
1935	1st Grade (Fox)	Mount Albert United	13	8	3	2	184	148	36	19	2nd of 7 (lost Phelan Shield final 8-11 v Ponsonby)
1936	1st Grade (Fox)	Mount Albert United	13	7	1	5	155	149	6	15	4th of 8
1937	1st Grade (Fox)	Mount Albert United	14	10	0	4	219	124	95	20	2nd of 8 (lost Phelan Shield final 18-22 v North Shore)
1938	1st Grade (Fox)	Mount Albert United	16	11	0	5	277	205	72	22	2nd of 9
1939	1st Grade (Fox)	Mount Albert United	16	13	1	2	284	165	119	27	1st of 9 (lost Roope Rooster final 11-13 v Marist, won Stormont Shield 21-9 v Marist)
1940	1st Grade (Fox)	Mount Albert United	16	10	0	6	285	206	79	20	3rd of 9 (lost Phelan Shield final 14-20 v Manukau)
1941	1st Grade (Fox)	Mount Albert United	15	5	0	10	187	238	-51	10	8th of 9
1942	1st Grade (Fox)	Newton-Mount Albert	15	6	0	9	160	208	-48	12	4th of 6 (combined side with Newton due to WW2 weakening senior playing numbers)
1943	1st Grade (Fox)	Mount Albert United	16	9	0	7	207	162	45	18	5th of 9
1944	1st Grade (Fox)	Mount Albert United	19	11	4	4	190	158	32	26	2nd of 10 (lost championship final to City 7-17, won v Otahuhu in RR R1, lost v Ponsonby 2-17 in RR SF.
1945	Fox Memorial	Mount Albert United	14	9	0	5	175	139	36	18	4th of 10
	Roope Rooster	Mount Albert United	3	2	0	1	49	45	4		W v Manukau 18-15, W v Ponsonby 19-13, L v North Shore 12-17 in SF
	Phelan Shield	Mount Albert United	1	0	0	1	5	25	-20		L v City 5-25 in SF
2022	1st Grade (Fox)	Mt Albert Lions	8	5	0	3	274	170	104	10	3rd of 9 in section 1
	Playoffs		1	1	0	1	58	62	-4		W v Otara 36-18 in PF, L v Pt Chevalier 40-22 in QF
2023	Fox Qualifiers	Mt Albert Lions	3	1	0	2	36	90	-54	2	3rd of 4 Pool B
	Fox Memorial		11	4	1	6	219	260	-41	9	7th of 12
2024	Fox Qualifiers	Mt Albert Lions	3	3	0	0	96	20	+76	6	1st of 4 Pool B
	Fox Memorial		11	5	1	5	302	280	+22	11	6th of 12
	Playoffs		1	0	0	1	10	22	-12	11	L v Te Atatu 10-22 in SF
2025	Fox Memorial	Mt Albert Lions	12	9	0	3	320	171	+149	18	2nd of 10
	Playoffs		2	1	0	1	26	24	+2	2	W v Manukau 22-16 in SF, L v Otahuhu 4-8 in Final
2026	Fox Memorial	Mt Albert Lions	14	7	1	6	270	293	-23	15	3rd of 8
	Playoffs		3	2	0	1	70	50	+20	-	W v Pt Chevalier 32-18 in min. SF, W v Manukau 22-12 in maj. SF, L v Otahuhu 16-20 in Grand Final
1928-44 + 2022-2026	TOTAL		445	236	22	185	7,330	6,527	+803	480	

== All time top point scorers (1935-1945) ==
The point scoring lists are compiled from all matches played in matches for the first grade side irrespective of whether they were organised Auckland Rugby League competition games, games against touring sides, or friendly matches outside of Auckland. The matches and point scorers includes the combined Newton-Mount Albert side of 1942.

Top point scorers
No	Player	Start	End	Games	Tries	Con	Pen	DG	Pts
1	Basil Cranch	1935	1945	143	47	84	62	0	433
2	Bert Leatherbarrow	1937	1943	101	48	23	13	0	220
3	Les Clement	1939	1945	119	45	15	5	0	175
4	Des Herring	1934	1940	88	35	21	10	0	167
5	Robert Morrissey	1935	1936	30	5	29	24	0	121
6	Bruce Donaldson	1939	-	20	9	29	16	1	119
7	Joseph Gunning	1935	1941	111	36	3	1	0	116
8	Bob Banham	1939	1940	32	3	26	17	0	95
9	Richard Shadbolt	1935	1945	146	29	1	0	0	89
10	Cliff Satherley	1936	1937	18	1	28	10	0	79
11	Colin Cowley	1939	1943	55	23	2	1	0	75
12	Arthur McInnarney	1938	1941	53	24	0	0	0	72
13=	Jack Tristram	1937	1941	90	20	0	0	0	60
13=	Clarry McNeil	1935	1939	34	20	0	0	0	60
15	William McCallum	1937	1938	20	19	0	0	0	57
16	Roy Hardgrave	1934	1939	26	18	0	0	0	54
17=	Martin Hansen	1937	1939	44	16	0	1	0	50
17=	Roy Niwa	1942	-	11	2	11	11	0	50
19	Ted Mincham	1938	-	8	3	10	6	0	41
20	Arnold Jones	1943	1944	36	13	0	0	0	39
