= 1994 New Zealand rugby league season =

Seasons
- 1993 1995

The 1994 New Zealand rugby league season was the 87th season of rugby league in New Zealand. The main feature of the season was the inaugural Lion Red Cup competition that was run by the New Zealand Rugby League. The North Harbour Sea Eagles won the Cup by defeating the Counties Manukau Heroes 24–16 in the Grand Final. At the end of the season the New Zealand national team was also assembled for a tour of Papua New Guinea.

== International competitions ==
The New Zealand national rugby league team did not play at home in 1994, instead embarking on a two test tour of Papua New Guinea. The Kiwis won all five matches, including a match against the Port Moresby Vipers. New Zealand included; Gary Freeman, Daryl Halligan, Terry Hermansson, Sean Hoppe, Stephen Kearney, John Lomax, Duane Mann, Jarrod McCracken, Gene Ngamu, Tawera Nikau, Hitro Okesene, Matthew Ridge, Tony Tatupu, Brendon Tuuta, Aaron Whittaker, Ruben Wiki and Jason Williams.

The New Zealand Residents toured Australia, winning all four games, before defeating Western Samoa 64–2 at Carlaw Park in Auckland. The team was Peter Edwards, Mike Dorreen, Tevita Vaikona, Maea David, Aaron Whittaker, Whetu Taewa, Solomon Kiri, Brett Roger, Henry Paul, David Bailey, Aaron Tucker, Faausu Afoa, Duane Mann (captain), Tony Tatupu, Jason Temu, Des Maea, Hitro Okesene, Simon Angell, Gavin Hill, Martin Moana, Aaron Lester and Logan Edwards. Kiwis coach Frank Endacott was also the Residents coach.

The New Zealand Māori side competed at the 1994 Pacific Cup in Fiji. The side was coached by John Solomon and included Blair Harding, Alex Chan, Tane Manihera, Leroy Joe, Mark Woods and Darren Rameka. The team failed to make the semi-finals for the first time, finishing third in a five team pool after losing to Tonga and the Australian Aborigines.

New Zealand sent a national team to the World Sevens for the first time. The team defeated France and the USA before losing to Fiji in the quarter-finals. The team included Earl Va'a, Jorgen Rogers, Richard Stewart and Jason Mackie and was coached by Paul Sixtus. The Wainuiomata Lions won the New Zealand Sevens competition held before the World Sevens.

The Junior Kiwis went on a five-match tour of Australia, winning four matches, including defeating the Australian Schoolboys in Australia for the first time ever. Coached by Gary Kemble the squad was: Spiro Tuilaepa, Gus Malietoa-Brown, Robbie Paul, Danny Lima, Nigel and Joe Vagana, Stacey Jones (captain), Justin Ngamoto, Ben Lythe, Stuart Lester, John Mann, Billy Weepu, Arti Mamoe, Takofe Kalauta, John Couling, Brad Williams, Clive Arona, Luke Johnstone, Dean Johnsen, Zane Clark, Chris Faifua and Regan Avery.

Duane Mann was the New Zealand Rugby League player of the year after leading the New Zealand national rugby league team and New Zealand Residents sides and captaining the North Harbour Sea Eagles to the Lion Red Cup. The other finalists were Daryl Halligan, John Lomax, Whetu Taewa and Aaron Whittaker.

=== Western Samoa tour ===
Western Samoa conducted a three match tour of New Zealand, its first ever. They defeated Wellington 22–14 and Manawatu XIII 36–22 before losing to the New Zealand Residents 64-2.

The team was Raymond Tusa, Ola Loau, Earl Va'a, Lokeni Savelio, Paki Tuimavave, Tony Tuimavave, Vinnie Winterstein, Mark Faumuina, Mike Setefano, Matthew Tuisamoa, Don Stewart, Henry Suluvale, Gafa Tuiloma, Ron Siami, Willie Poching, Mualia Fuiava, Wayne Schuster, Tafunai Alaelua, Toka Tofaeano, Muse Galuvao and Veli Patu. The coach was Steve Kaiser. Tony Tuimavave was the captain while Willie Poching led the team against Manawatu. Tea Ropati was originally named in the squad but withdrew due to injury. Maika Felise was later added to the squad.

== National competitions ==
=== Rugby League Cup ===
Auckland and Wellington both unsuccessfully challenged Canterbury for the Rugby League Cup during the season.

First, Wellington were thrashed 72–14 by Cup holders Canterbury on Anzac Day. The Wellington side was weakened the day before the match when the four Hutt Valley Firehawks players selected withdrew after a Lion Red Cup match. Wellington included Paul Howell while Canterbury included Tevita Vaikona, Phil Bancroft, Aaron Whittaker, Marty Crequer, Henry Suluvale and Shane Endacott.

Then Auckland, coached by Dominic Clark, lost 20–28 to Canterbury on Queen's Birthday. The Auckland team included Solomon Kiri, Whetu Taewa, Bryan Laumatia, Brian McClennan, Fa'ausu Afoa, Jason Palmada, Stacey Jones, Duane Mann, Tony Tatupu, Doc Murray and Hitro Okesene. Canterbury included Mark Nixon, Logan Edwards, Marty Crequer, Tevita Vaikona and Shane Endacott.

=== Lion Red Cup ===
Buoyed by the acceptance of an Auckland team into the 1995 Australian Rugby League competition, the New Zealand Rugby League launched a twelve-team national club competition in 1994. Known as the Lion Red Cup for sponsorship reasons, this competition proved to be hugely expensive and lost a million dollars in 1994.

==== The Teams ====
- The North Harbour Sea Eagles were sponsored by Just Jeans and coached by Graeme Norton. Their two main feeder clubs were the Fox Memorial-winning Northcote Tigers and the Hibiscus Coast Raiders. Notable players included Ken McIntosh, Brian McClennan, captain Duane Mann, Fa'ausu Afoa, Paul Rauhihi, Jason Palmada, Don Stewart, Richard Stewart, Tony Tatupu, Latham Tawhai and Joe Vagana.
- Despite making the final of the pre-season competition, the Waitakere City Raiders were easily the worst of the Auckland sides, especially in the first round of the competition. Coach Ron O'Regan blooded a group of young players in the second round and performances improved enough for them to finish in seventh place. Forty Four players were used overall in their season, including Tony Tuimavave, Peter Lima, Robbie and Henry Paul, Willie Swann, Willie McLean, Julian O'Neill, David Bailey, Brady Malam, Anthony Swann and Paki Tuimavave.
- After winning the Pepsi Max Knockout Cup the Auckland City Vulcans started the season as favourites. However the Gary Prohm coached side ended the season in fifth place and were then quickly eliminated from the playoffs by the Canterbury Cardinals in Christchurch. Stacey Jones foreshadowed his 1995 season with the Auckland Warriors by taking over the halfback position during the season from established New Zealand Sevens captain Vinnie Weir. Other notable players included Mark Faumuina, Aaron Lester, Eugene Bourneville, Danny Lima, Jason Mackie, Doc Murray, Meti Noovao and Mike Setefano.
- The Counties Manukau Heroes started the season as the least favoured Auckland club but ended up in the grand final and produced five New Zealand Residents representatives, two New Zealand national rugby league team, the coach of the year and the competition's top pointscorer. They were coached by former Marist coach Stan Martin and ended up losing 10 players to professional clubs at the end of the season. The players were: Des Maea, Gus Malietoa-Brown, Hitro Okesene, Whetu Taewa and Solomon Kiri to the Auckland Warriors, Jason Temu and Wilson Marsh to Oldham, Kerry Pomare to Widnes, Paul Okesene to France and Bryan Laumatia to the Cronulla Sharks. Other notable players included Esau Mann, Matthew Sturm, Matthew Tuisamoa and Willie Wolfgramm.
- The Waikato Cougars were coached by Joe Gwynne and captained by Tukere Barlow. The team finished second after the regular season but a series of injuries saw them perform poorly in the playoffs and they were quickly eliminated. Notable players included Gavin Hill, Tama Hohaia, Francis Leota, Martin Moana and Aaron Tucker.
- The Bay of Plenty Stags finished the season in last place, winning only two matches in twenty two rounds. They were coached by Neil Joyce and the squad included Alex Chan and Russell Stewart. The Stags drew players from both the Bay of Plenty Rugby League and the Coastlines Rugby League competitions.
- The Taranaki Rockets were widely regarded as the competitions easy beats until they made the semifinals of the pre-season competition. They performed well for the first nine weeks, with five wins and four losses until they suffered a run of injuries and coach Teri Tamati stepped down for health reasons. Despite this, under caretaker coach Alan Marshall, the Rockets recovered to finish sixth and just miss the playoffs. Notable players included Robert Piva, Mark Woods and Willie Talau.
- Coached by Gary Kemble, the Hawkes Bay Unicorns finished a disappointing tenth. Notable players included captain Mike Dorreen and 17-year-old Charlie Kennedy, who both signed contracts with the Auckland Warriors at the end of the season, as well as Joe Faimalo, who signed with Oldham, and Nathan Picchi.
- The Firestone Hutt Valley Firehawks finished a disappointing eighth in the Lion Red Cup. They were coached by Tyrone Paikea and included Zane Clark, captain Peter Edwards, David Ewe and Denvour Johnston.
- The Wellington City Dukes were coached by James Leuluai and included Paul Howell, Earl Va'a, Riki Cowan, Darren Rameka and Arnold Lomax.
- Coached by former Kiwi Wayne Wallace, the Christchurch City Shiners were clearly the "second" Canterbury team in the competition and finished in eleventh place. The team included Simon Angell, Tane Manihera, Andrew Vincent and Marty Crequer.
- The Canterbury Country Cardinals were coached by Gerard Stokes and included few players from the champion 1993 Canterbury provincial side after many accepted contracts overseas or with other Lion Red Cup teams. Notable players included Glen Coughlan, Logan Edwards, Shane Endacott, Paul Johnson, Mark Nixon, Phil Bancroft, Maea David, Blair Harding, Henry Suluvale, Tevita Vaikona and Aaron Whittaker.

==== Challenge Cup ====
Before the season began a pre-season "Pepsi Max Challenge Cup" was held. This involved all twelve teams and was held on a knock out basis. Auckland City won the tournament, defeating Waitakere City 22–18 in the final on March 13. North Harbour and Taranaki were the two defeated semi-finalists.

==== Season standings ====
The Counties Manukau Heroes finished the season as minor premiers.

Team	Pld	W	D	L	PF	PA	PD	Pts
Counties Manukau Heroes	22	16	2	4	563	334	219	34
Waikato Cougars	22	16	1	5	589	405	184	33
North Harbour Sea Eagles	22	16	0	6	524	299	225	32
Canterbury Country Cardinals	22	15	2	5	615	410	205	32
Auckland City Vulcans	22	14	1	7	517	363	154	29
Taranaki Rockets	22	10	1	11	481	536	-55	21
Waitakere City Raiders	22	9	1	12	530	487	43	19
Hutt Valley Firehawks	22	9	0	13	474	499	-25	18
Wellington City Dukes	22	8	0	14	470	508	-38	16
Hawkes Bay Unicorns	22	7	0	15	377	485	-108	14
Christchurch City Shiners	22	6	0	16	358	634	-276	12
Bay of Plenty Stags	22	2	0	20	262	800	-538	4

==== The Playoffs ====
Qualifying and elimination finals
2	Waikato	10
3	North Harbour	24
4	Canterbury Country	30
5	Auckland City	22

Semi-finals
1	Counties Manukau	22
North Harbour	25
Waikato	6
Canterbury Country	32

Preliminary final
Counties Manukau	34
Canterbury Country	16

Grand final
North Harbour	24
Counties Manukau	16

Match	Winner		Loser
Elimination Play-off	Canterbury Cardinals	30	Auckland City Vulcans	22
Preliminary Semifinal	North Harbour Sea Eagles	24	Waikato Cougars	10
Elimination Semifinal	Canterbury Cardinals	32	Waikato Cougars	6
Qualification Semifinal	North Harbour Sea Eagles	25	Counties Manukau Heroes	22
Preliminary Final	Counties Manukau Heroes	34	Canterbury Cardinals	16

===== Grand Final =====
North Harbour	Position	Counties Manukau
Quinten Dane	FB	Wilson Marsh
Steve Johnston	WG	Bryan Laumatia
Tony Tatupu	CE	Gus Malietoa-Brown
Jason Kaulima	CE	Whetu Taewa
Richard Stewart	WG	Solomon Kiri
Ken McIntosh	FE	Matthew Tuisamoa
Latham Tawhai	HB	Vinnie Clark
Faausu Afoa	PR	Kerry Pomare
Duane Mann (C)	HK	Hitro Okesene (C)
Lafaele Filipo	PR	Jason Temu
Joe Vagana	SR	Paul Okesene
Don Stewart	SR	Matthew Sturm
Glen Palmer	LK	Esau Mann
Jeff Thurston	Bench	Willy Wolfgramm
Jason Palmada	Bench	Fred Morunga
Michael Patterson	Bench	Des Maea
Patrick Hellesoe	Bench	Steve Ekepai
Graeme Norton	Coach	Stan Martin

Counties Manukau started the match as favourites, however by halftime the North Harbour Sea Eagles had opened up a 20-6 lead and held on to win 24–16.

Team	Halftime	Total
North Harbour Sea Eagles	20	24
Counties Manukau Heroes	6	16

Tries (North Harbour)	2: J.Kaulima
	1: F.Afoa, L.Filipo, J.Palmada
Tries (Counties Manukau)	1: G.Malietoa-Brown, E.Manu, S.Ekepati
Goals (North Harbour)	1: Q.Dane, L.Tawhai
Goals (Counties Manukau)	2: W.Marsh
Date	25 September
Referee	Phil Houston
Venue	Carlaw Park
Broadcast	TVNZ

==== Awards ====
- Player of the Year: Duane Mann (North Harbour)
- Coach of the Year: Stan Martin (Counties Manukau)
- Captain of the Year: Duane Mann (North Harbour)
- Best and Fairest: Paul Howell (Wellington City)
- Referee of the Year: Phil Houston

Team of the Year

- Fullback: Peter Edwards (Hutt Valley)
- Wing: Solomon Kiri (Counties Manukau)
- Centre: Whetu Taewa (Counties Manukau)
- Standoff: David Bailey (Waitakere City)
- Scrumhalf: Aaron Tucker (Waikato)
- Loose forward: Martin Moana (Waikato)
- Second row: Tony Tatupu (North Harbour)
- Prop forward: Jason Temu (Counties Manukau)
- Hooker: Duane Mann (North Harbour)

Top Try Scorers

- 18 Henry Suluvale (Canterbury Country)
- 16 David Bailey (Waitakere City)
- 16 Bryan Laumatia (Counties Manukau)
- 16 Whetu Taewa (Counties Manukau)
- 14 Paul Howell (Wellington City)
- 14 Martin Moana (Waikato)
- 14 Tevita Vaikona (Canterbury Country)
- 13 Steve Johnston (North Harbour)
- 12 Solomon Kiri (Counties Manukau)
- 12 Tukere Barlow (Waikato)
- 12 Geoffrey Tangira (Taranaki)

Top Point Scorers

- 223 Wilson Marsh (Counties Manukau)
- 160 Paul Howell (Wellington)
- 152 Gavin Hill (Waikato)
- 136 Aaron Whittaker (Canterbury Country)
- 118 Jason Gilbert (Hutt Valley)
- 101 Dave Mackintosh (North Harbour)
- 85 Earl Va'a (Wellington City)
- 84 David Bailey (Waitakere City)
- 84 David Murray (Auckland City)
- 81 Blair Nickson (Taranaki)
- 80 Wayne Trainor (Auckland City)

=== National Provincial Championship ===
With the advent of the Lion Red Cup, the National Provincial Championship was run as a second division for provincial sides who did not have a team in the Cup. Six teams participated with the West Coast winning the Championship after an undefeated season. The Gisborne-East Coast Lions won their first game since May 1991.

Team	Pld	W	D	L	PF	PA	Pts
West Coast	5	5	0	0	242	65	10
Northland	5	3	1	1	117	113	7
Manawatu	5	3	0	2	170	136	6
Gisborne-East Coast Lions	5	1	1	3	106	172	3
Southland	5	1	0	4	103	199	2
Otago	5	1	0	4	80	159	2

=== National Secondary Schools Cup ===
St. Paul's College won the National Secondary Schools Cup after they defeated Wainuiomata College 33–10 in the final. 23 Schools took part in the inaugural national competition with Huntly College and Aranui High School also making the semi-finals. The final was played as a curtain-raiser to the Lion Red Cup grand final. St. Paul's included Stacey Jones in their side and also won the Auckland Rugby League title.

== Club competitions ==
=== Auckland ===
The Northcote Tigers won the Fox Memorial in 1994 for the fourth consecutive year defeating the Otahuhu Leopards 32–12. Otahuhu won the Rukutai Shield (minor premiership) and also won the Stormont Shield and preseason Roope Rooster tournament. Northcote included Paul Rauhihi and Ken McIntosh while Otahuhu included Leroy Joe, Danny Lima, Brian Henare and Meti Noovao.

Hibiscus Coast were the main surprise, finishing second in the minor premiership with Brian McClennan as the player-coach.

Leroy Joe from Otahuhu won the Lipscombe Cup as the Premier One sportsman of the year.

=== Wellington ===
Marist-Northern, coached by Ken Laban, won the Grand Final 37–26 over the Upper Hutt Tigers. The Wainuiomata Lions were the minor premiers but lost twice in the playoffs to be quickly eliminated.

Maika Felise from Wainuiomata won the Colin O'Neil Trophy as the best and fairest in the competition.

=== Canterbury ===
The Papanui Tigers won the Pat Smith Challenge Trophy by defeating last years champions, the Haswell Hawks, 14–4 in the Canterbury Rugby League grand final. Papanui, who featured Shane Endacott and Blair Harding, also won the minor premiership.

Aaron Whittaker was named the Canterbury Rugby League's player of the year.

=== Northland ===
The Moerewa Tigers won the Northland Super Six Series by defeating the Takahiwai Warriors 34–28.

The Portland Panthers won the Whangarei City & Districts title, by defeating the Takahiwai Warriors 30–20 in Whangarei.

The Kaikohe Lions won the Bay of Islands title, by defeating the Moerewa Tigers.

The Te Paatu Warriors won the Far North Districts title, by defeating the Whangatauatia Mountain Men.

=== Other competitions ===
Minor premiers Turangawaewae defeated the Hamilton City Tigers 30–23 to win the Waikato Rugby League Final. Taniwharau, led by Tama Hohaia, won the Pre-season tournament while Hamilton Boys' High School won the High School Shield.

Piako dominated the Bay of Plenty Rugby League season, winning the early season Ces Mountford Trophy round before finishing with the minor premiership and winning the grand final 22-10 over Turangi.

The Western Suburbs Tigers defeated the Waitara Bears 22–20 in the Taranaki Rugby League grand final to end the Bears dominance of the region. The Kia Ora Warriors, coached by Peter Sixtus, won the Manawatu Rugby League grand final 20–16 over Linton.

The Taradale Eagles upset Tamatea 38-22 in the Hawke's Bay final to deny them their third consecutive premiership in front of 1500 fans. Minor premiers, the Repongaere Eels, defeated the Turanga Panthers 36–24 to win the Gisborne-East Coast grand final.

The Golden Bay Boars defeated the Motueka Tigers 22-19 in the Nelson competition before defeating the Blenheim Knights 42–4 to win the Top of the South competition. Blenheim were the Marlborough champions. This was the first time a team in any sport from Takaka had ever won a Nelson competition. The Golden Bay Boars women also won their respective competition in the same year making it a clean sweep for the Boars.

Waro-Rakau smashed Papanui to 40–4 to win the Thacker Shield and bring it to the West Coast for the first time since 1982. Former Kiwi Blair Harding scored the only try for Papanui. The Waro-Rakau Hornets had earlier won the West Coast competition for the second consecutive year when they defeated Runanga 42–8 in the grand final. The Hornets were also the competitions minor premiers and scored 862 points throughout the season while only conceding 146.

He Tauaa defeated the South Pacific Raiders 29-26 to win the Otago-Southland Swains Trophy. However, He Tauaa lost the Southland grand final to the Coalshop Leopards. The South Pacific Raiders were undefeated in Otago and won the grand final 18-8 against Kiatoa.
