= 1992 New Zealand rugby league season =

Seasons
- ← 1991 1993 →

The 1992 New Zealand rugby league season was the 85th season of rugby league that had been played in New Zealand. The main feature of the year was the National Provincial Competition that was won by Auckland.

== International competitions ==
The New Zealand national rugby league team defeated the touring Papua New Guinea side 66-10 before drawing a Test series against the Great Britain Lions 1-all. They first defeated Great Britain 15–14 in Palmerston North before losing the second Test 16–19 at Carlaw Park.

Coached by new coach Howie Tamati and managed by Richard Bolton, the squad for the three Test matches was: Matthew Ridge, Richard Blackmore, Gary Freeman, Dean Clark, Tony Kemp, Sean Hoppe, Daryl Halligan, Gavin Hill, Brent Stuart, Duane Mann, Brent Todd, Kevin Iro, Quentin Pongia, Brendon Tuuta, Mark Woods, Tea Ropati, Mike Kuiti and Tawera Nikau.

Before the Test matches the Possibles drew with the Probables 20-all in a Kiwis trial. Craig Innes was the surprise inclusion in the Probables team.

Papua New Guinea played four matches in New Zealand. They first lost to a Hawke's Bay XIII 14-10 before defeating the Kiwi Colts (under 23's) 36–16. They then lost 43–36 to a Northland XIII before losing the Test match 66–10. The Kumuls then headed to Australia for a three match tour. Both Invitational sides were coached by Gary Kemble while Joe Gwyne coached the Kiwi Colts. Hawke's Bay included Tukere Barlow while Northland included Jason Mackie.

Great Britain then arrived after thirteen games in Australia and Papua New Guinea. They opened their tour with a 14–8 defeat of Auckland, their first victory over Auckland since 1979. The Kiwis won the first Test, coming from 14-6 behind for a 15–14 victory. The Lions then defeated Canterbury 17-6 before winning the second Test 19–16 to tie the series and finish the tour.

Three more high-profile New Zealand rugby union players switched to rugby league during the year. They were Craig Innes (Leeds), Eion Crossan (South Sydney) and Gavin Hill (Canterbury-Bankstown). Hill played for the Kiwis after only 10 first grade games of rugby league.

New Zealand hosted the Pacific Cup. The tournament was won by Western Samoa, who defeated Tonga 18–14 in the final at Carlaw Park, after double extra time. The New Zealand Māori squad, who finished third, consisted of Peter Edwards, Richie Barnett, Whetu Taewa, Ruben Wiki, Jason Kaulima, David Ewe, David Bailey, Dean Clark, Ken McIntosh, Daryl Beazley, Mark Chambers, John Lomax, Syd Eru, Tukere Barlow, captain Mark Woods and Jason Mackie. Quentin Pongia was unavailable.

The Junior Kiwis hosted the Australian Schoolboys in September. The Schoolboys opened the tour by defeating a Taranaki XIII 60-6 before defeating the Junior Kiwis 26–24 in the first "Test". They then defeated the Auckland under-19s, who were missing their Junior Kiwis representatives, 32–12. In the final game of the tour, the Junior Kiwis defeated the Australian Schoolboys 36–14. The match was the first the Schoolboys had lost to either New Zealand or Great Britain since 1972. The Junior Kiwis were coached by Frank Endacott and named the same side for both matches. The team was: Justin Paul, Gafa Tuiloma, Tana Umaga, Ruben Wiki, Peter Lima, Gene Ngamu, Tane Manihere, David Fatialofa, Brady Malam, Barry Feuu, Joe Vagana, Willie Poching, Martin Moana. Bench: Shannon Lee, Aaron Lester, Alex Chan and Robert Pokoati.

Meti Noovao played for the Auckland under-19s. Frank Watene, captain David Kidwell and Phillip Shead were all named in the New Zealand under-15 team. Billy Weepu, Gus Malietoa-Brown, Robbie Paul, Danny Lima and Awen Guttenbeil all made the under-17 team.

New Zealand referee Dennis Hale became the first referee to control six Test matches in a twelve-month period between 1991 and 1992. Hale also equaled the record of five Test matches within a calendar year.

Dean Bell was the New Zealand Rugby League's player of the year. Ray Haffenden was voted onto the New Zealand Rugby League's board during the year, while former Kiwi Ken Stirling was one of the four directors who lost their positions.

== National competitions ==
=== Rugby League Cup ===
Holders Canterbury easily defeated Bay of Plenty 28-8 before surprisingly losing to Wellington 36–26 on 17 May. Three weeks later Canterbury regained the Rugby League Cup by defeating Wellington 31–22.

=== National Provincial Competition ===
==== First Division ====
- Auckland were coached by Owen Wright and included Faausu Afoa, David Bailey, Logan Campbell, Dean Clark, Mark Elia, Clayton Friend, Stu Galbraith, Sean Hoppe, Francis Leota, Jason Lowrie, Brady Malam, Ken McIntosh, Jason Palmada, Mike Patton, James Pickering, Willie Poching, Iva Ropati, Don Stewart, Tony Tatupu, Tony Tuimavave and Matthew Tuisamoa. George Mann was called up for the match against Great Britain but instructed by his club, St Helens R.F.C., not to play.
- The Bay of Plenty were coached by Tony Gordon and included Gary Mercer, debutant Alex Chan and Russell Stewart. Gordon retired from representative coaching at the end of the season.
- Wellington included Mike Kuiti, George Lajpold, Barry Harvey, Morvin Edwards, captain John Lomax, Mark Woods, David Ewe, Peter Edwards, Yogi Rogers, Syd Eru, Ricky Cowan, Tana Umaga, David Lomax and Denvour Johnston.
- Canterbury were coached by Frank Endacott and included Simon Angell, Phil Bergman, Maea David, Mike Dorreen, Shane Endacott, Terry Hermansson, captain Mark Nixon, Quentin Pongia, Brent Stuart, Whetu Taewa, Brendon Tuuta, Justin Wallace and Andrew Vincent. Bergman, David and Endacott all made their debuts for Canterbury during the year.

Team	Pld	W	D	L	PF	PA	Pts
Auckland	6	5	1	0	164	63	11
Canterbury	6	3	1	2	131	110	7
Wellington	6	3	0	3	173	137	6
Bay of Plenty	6	0	0	6	48	206	0

==== Second Division ====
===== North Island =====
- Northland were again coached by Anthony Murray and included Jason Mackie.
- Waikato were coached by Cecil Kells and included Martin Moana and new captain Tukere Barlow. During the season Tama Hohaia made his debut for Waikato.

Team	Pld	W	L	PF	PA	Pts
Northland	5	4	1	157	72	8
Waikato	5	4	1	166	86	8
Taranaki	5	3	2	118	118	6
Hawkes Bay	5	2	3	145	119	4
Manawatu	5	2	3	116	130	4
Gisborne-East Coast	5	0	5	40	217	0

===== South Island =====
- Gerard Stokes coached the Canterbury Emerging Players side that included Paul Johnson and Blair Harding.
- West Coast included Wayne Dwyer.

Team	Pld	W	D	L	PF	PA	Pts
West Coast	3	3	0	0	87	40	6
Canterbury Emerging Players	3	2	0	1	120	45	4
Southland	3	0	1	2	56	118	1
Otago	3	0	1	2	36	106	1

=== National Club Competition ===
The Wainuiomata Lions defeated the Northcote Tigers 25-18at Carlaw Park in the Lion Red National Cup's Grand Final.

Instead of a knock out competition, the National Club Competition consisted of eight teams from the four first division districts, split into two pools.

Earlier in the season the first New Zealand club sevens tournament had been held. This was also won by the Wainuiomata Lions, who earned the right to represent New Zealand at the World Sevens.

==== Pool A ====
Team	Pld	W	L	PF	PA	Pts
Wainuiomata Lions	3	2	1	118	48	4
Ngongotaha Chiefs	3	2	1	55	48	4
Mount Albert Lions	3	2	1	70	86	4
Sydenham Swans	3	0	3	48	109	0

==== Pool B ====
Team	Pld	W	L	PF	PA	Pts
Northcote Tigers	3	3	0	95	54	6
Otahuhu Leopards	3	2	1	67	37	4
Upper Hutt Tigers	3	1	2	56	73	0
Papanui Tigers	3	0	3	36	90	0

== Australian competitions ==
Twenty Five New Zealand players played in the Winfield Cup in 1992. Gary Freeman won the Dally M Medal for the Eastern Suburbs Roosters. The other twenty four players were; Eion Crossan (Souths), Ali Davys (Gold Coast), Jason Donnelly (St George), Stu Galbraith (Parramatta), Daryl Halligan (Norths), Gavin Hill (Canterbury), Sean Hoppe (Canberra), Mark Horo (Parramatta), Kevin Iro (Manly), Tony Iro (Manly), Stephen Kearney (Wests), Tony Kemp (Newcastle), Jarrod McCracken (Canterbury), Gene Ngamu (Manly), Matthew Ridge (Manly), John Schuster (Newcastle), Kurt Sherlock (Easts), Paul Simonsson (Norths), Sam Stewart (Newcastle), Brent Todd (Gold Coast), Aaron Whittaker (Illawarra), Darrell Williams (Manly), Jason Williams (Canterbury) and Iain Wood (Gold Coast).

Eight of the Sixteen Winfield Cup teams played matches in New Zealand, including both semi finals of the pre-season Tooheys Challenge Cup. The Brisbane Broncos defeated the Western Suburbs Magpies at Athletic Park while the Illawarra Steelers defeated the Cronulla Sharks at Carlaw Park. The Manly Sea Eagles then took their first round match against the Newcastle Knights to Carlaw Park, the first time a Winfield Cup match had been held in New Zealand.

During the pre season, Hugh McGahan ended his career in Christchurch, playing for the Eastern Suburbs Roosters as they defeated a South selection 28–4. The Manly Sea Eagles defeated a Hawke's Bay-Wellington Invitational XIII team 42–2 in Hastings and the Canberra Raiders defeated Auckland 32–14 at Carlaw Park in front of a capacity 17,000 crowd.

== Club competitions ==
=== Auckland ===
The Northcote Tigers defended their Fox Memorial title, defeating the Mount Albert Lions 11–6 in the Grand Final. Northcote also won the Roope Rooster while Mount Albert won the Rukutai Shield.

James Pickering and Joe Vagana played for Richmond, Tony Tatupu Willie Poching and Franklin Fonua played for the Mount Albert Lions and Iva Ropati and Brian Laumatia played for the Mangere East Hawks. Des Maea, Tawera Nikau, Richie Blackmore, Dean Clark, Richie Barnett and Ruben Wiki played for the Otahuhu Leopards. Phil Bancroft played for City-Point Chev while Te Atatu were coached by Ron O'Regan and included David Bailey. Fa'ausu Afoa, Ken McIntosh, Stu Galbraith, Sean Hoppe, Gene Ngamu, Mark Elia, captain Tony Tuimavave, Logan Campbell, Jason Lowrie and Don Stewart played for the Northcote Tigers, who were coached by Graeme Norton.

=== Wellington ===
The Wainuiomata Lions won the Wellington Rugby League grand final, their third in four years, when they defeated the Upper Hutt Tigers 24–10.

Peter Edwards, David Ewe, Syd Eru and Mark Woods played for Upper Hutt while Denvour Johnston and George Lajpold played for Randwick. John, Arnold, Tony and David Lomax played for the Wainuiomata Lions, as did Yogi Rogers, Ali Davys, Tana Umaga and Earl Va'a. Craig Innes also played in two promotional games for the Lions during the season.

=== Canterbury ===
Minor premiers Papanui won the Canterbury Rugby League grand final, defeating Sydenham 28–12.

The Papanui Tigers then defended the Thacker Shield for Canterbury, defeating Cobden-Kohinoor 46–28.

Maea David, Paul Johnson and Blair Harding played for Papanui while Shane Endacott played for Sydenham.

=== Other Competitions ===
The Takahiwai Warriors, who included Jason Mackie won the Northland Rugby League title, defeating the Moerewa Tigers 28–10. The Hokianga Pioneers defeating the Kaikohe Lions 24–22 to win the Bay of Islands championship in front of 2,000 fans.

Turangawaewae won the Waikato Rugby League grand final, defeating the Hamilton City Tigers, who included Tukere Barlow, 7–6. Turangawaewae also won the pre-season competition. The Ngongotaha Chiefs dominated the Bay of Plenty Rugby League competition, winning the Grand Final 30–2 over the Turangi Dambusters. The Chiefs included former All Black Gary Braid, who had switched codes during the off-season, and player-coach Russell Stewart, while Alex Chan played for Taupo.

The Waitara Bears defended their Taranaki Rugby League championship with a 42-8 grand final win over the Western Suburbs team. The Linton Army team won the Manawatu Rugby League title, defeating Kia Ora 22–16 in the final.

The Repongaere Eels won the Gisborne-East Coast Rugby League title, defeating the Paikea Whalers 22–18 in the Grand Final. Minor premiers Tamatea won the Hawke's Bay Rugby League title 32–24 over the Flaxmere Falcons in a 100-minute Grand Final that went into double over time.

Suburbs won the West Coast Rugby League grand final, defeating Cobden-Kohinoor. Marist were coached by Tony Coll and included Wayne Dwyer while Suburbs included Glen Gibb. The St Kilda Sharks won the Otago Rugby League grand final while He Tauaa won the Southland Rugby League's title.
