= Stan Martin (rugby league) =

New Zealand rugby league footballer (1953–2025)

Personal information
- Full name: Stanley Alexander Martin
- Born: 15 April 1953 New Zealand
- Died: 10 September 2025 (aged 72)

Playing information
Club
Years	Team	Pld	T	G	FG	P
1959–81	Richmond Bulldogs

Coaching information
Club
Years	Team	Gms	W	D	L	W%
1992–93	Marist Saints
1994–95	Counties Manukau	50	32	3	15	64
1995–99	Whitehaven
	Total	50	32	3	15	64
Representative
Years	Team	Gms	W	D	L	W%
2000	Cook Islands	3	0	1	2	0
2008	New Zealand Women

Stanley Alexander Martin (15 April 1953 – 10 September 2025) was a New Zealand rugby league footballer who played in the 1950s through to the 1980s, and coached in the 1990s and 2000s. He coached at representative level for the Cook Islands at the 2000 World Cup and New Zealand Women (Kiwi Ferns) to victory in the 2008 Women's Rugby League World Cup, and at club level for Marist Saints, Counties Manukau and Whitehaven.

== Playing career ==
A Richmond Bulldogs player in the Auckland Rugby League competition, Martin won the Rothville Trophy in 1980 as the Premier One player of the year. He toured Australia in 1973 with the Auckland under-23 side.

== Coaching career ==
Martin began his career coaching the Marist Saints in the Auckland Rugby League.

Martin was the inaugural coach of the Counties Manukau Heroes in the Lion Red Cup between 1994 and 1995. At the end of the 1994 season he was named the coach of the year. In 1995 Martin was also the coach of the Junior Kiwis.

Martin then left New Zealand, signing with Whitehaven in England. He coached Whitehaven for four years before returning to New Zealand. During his time at Whitehaven he enticed a number of New Zealand players to join the club; Aaron Lester, David Fatialofa, Leroy Joe, Siose Muliumu and Gus Malietoa-Brown. He still retained close links with the club.

At the 2000 World Cup Martin coached the Cook Islands team.

In 1999, 2001, 2004 and 2005 Martin coached the Auckland side.

In 2005, Martin was appointed coach of the Kiwi Ferns, the New Zealand women's national team. He remained in this position until 2010, when he shifted to the role of technical advisor.

Beginning in 2009, Martin was a registered player agent for the NRL.

== Death ==
Martin died on 10 September 2025, at the age of 72.
