= Faumuina =

Faumuina is a surname. Notable people with the surname include:

- Beatrice Faumuina (born 1974), New Zealand discus thrower.
- Charlie Faumuina (born 1986), rugby union player.
- Mark Faumuina (born 1971), New Zealand rugby league player.
- Sione Faumuina (born 1981), New Zealand rugby league player.
- Wilson Faumuina (1954–1986), American football defensive lineman.
- Faumuina Sikuka Lomitusi Samoan genealogist and historian

Faumuina
