= Paki Tuimavave =

Former Samoa international rugby league footballer

Personal information
- Born: Western Samoa

Playing information
- Position: Fullback
Club
Years	Team	Pld	T	G	FG	P
1994	Waitakere City	16	11	0	0	44
1995–96	North Harbour	21	13	0	0	52
	Total	37	24	0	0	96
Representative
Years	Team	Pld	T	G	FG	P
1992–96	Western Samoa
- Relatives: Paddy Tuimavave (brother); Tony Tuimavave (brother)

Paki Tuimavave is a Samoan former professional rugby league footballer who played in the 1980s and 1990s. He played at representative level for Western Samoa, and at club level for Waitakere City and North Harbour, as a fullback.

== Background ==
Also see Category:Tuimavave family.

He is the brother of fellow internationals Tony and Paddy Tuimavave.

== Playing career ==
Tuimavave played for the Waitakere City Raiders in the 1994 Lion Red Cup and toured New Zealand with Western Samoa in 1994.

In 1995 and 1996 he played for the North Harbour Sea Eagles in the Lion Red Cup, scoring a try in the 1995 grand final. He represented Auckland in the 1997 Super League Challenge Cup. He scored 26 tries over the three seasons of the Lion Red Cup.

== Representative career ==
Tuimavave played at the 1995 World Cup for Western Samoa. He also represented Western Samoa in the 1992 Pacific Cup, where he was named at fullback in the team of the tournament, and in the 1996 Pacific Challenge.
