= Ron O'Regan =

NZ international rugby league footballer & coach

Personal information
- Full name: Ronald Phillip O'Regan
- Born: 4 July 1960 (age 66) Auckland, New Zealand

Playing information
- Position: Centre, Stand-off, Lock
Club
Years	Team	Pld	T	G	FG	P
	City Newton
1981–83	Barrow Raiders	38	11	0	0	44
	Mt Albert Lions
	Te Atatu Roosters
	Total	38	11	0	0	44
Representative
Years	Team	Pld	T	G	FG	P
	Auckland	60
1983	New Zealand Māori
1983–86	New Zealand	8	0	0	0	0

Coaching information
Club
Years	Team	Gms	W	D	L	W%
1988–93	Te Atatu Roosters
1994–95	Waitakere City Raiders	44	19	2	23	43
	Total	44	19	2	23	43

Ronald Phillip O'Regan is a New Zealand former rugby league footballer, and coach who represented New Zealand between 1983 and 1986. His nephew, Daniel, played for the New Zealand Warriors.

== Playing career ==
As a young boy he idolised players such as Roger Bailey.

In 1981 and 1983, while playing for City Newton, O'Regan won the Rothville Trophy, awarded to the player of the year in the Auckland Rugby League competition.

He toured England with the New Zealand Māori side in 1983.

As a 17 year old was offered a contract to play league at Wigan but did not take it up. He was selected as an 18 year old to play for the Auckland representative team in the Amco Cup against professional New South Wales Rugby league clubs and other Australian teams.

Between 1983 and 1986 O'Regan represented New Zealand, playing in eight Test Matches for New Zealand. He and Dean Bell debuted in the first test in 1983 against Australia at Carlaw Park. They lost to Australia in the first test but won the second test which was played in Lang Park, Brisbane.

O'Regan spent the 1981–82 and 1982-83 off seasons in England, playing for the Barrow Raiders in the North of England. At age 21 he captained the team.

He also represented the Mt Albert Lions.

In 1987 O'Regan toured England again, this time with the Auckland side. coached by Bob Bailey. The Auckland team beat a Wigan team containing some greats of the game such as Andy Gregory, Martin Offiah, Ellery Hanley, Shaun Edwards, Andy Goodway and Joe Lydon by 10 points to 6.

In 1988 O'Regan was the player-coach of the Te Atatu Roosters and guided them to winning the Fox Memorial Grand Final. He won the Hyland Memorial Cup that year as coach of the year.

== Coaching career ==
O'Regan later became a full-time coach of the Roosters and in 1993 nearly repeated the feat, as the Roosters lost the Fox Memorial grand final 10–29 to the Northcote Tigers.

O'Regan was the coach of the Waitakere City Raiders in the Lion Red Cup in 1994 and 1995.

== Later years ==
O'Regan now trains greyhounds in Paeroa. In 2006 he was involved with a doping scandal that saw a vet banned from the sport for 10 years.
