= Willie Wolfgramm =

Tonga international rugby league footballer and coach

Personal information
- Born: 20 September 1970 (age 55)

Playing information
- Position: Halfback
Club
Years	Team	Pld	T	G	FG	P
1994	Counties Manukau	19	9	0	0	36
1996	Swinton Lions	21	15	0	0	60
	Total	40	24	0	0	96
Representative
Years	Team	Pld	T	G	FG	P
1992–06	Tonga	8	5	0	0	20
- Relatives: Greg Wolfgramm (cousin)

Willie Wolfgramm is a former professional rugby league and rugby union player who represented Tonga at two Rugby League World Cups and the 1993 Rugby World Cup Sevens.

== Background ==
He is the cousin of fellow Tongan international Greg Wolfgramm.

== Playing career ==
Wolfgramm played for Tonga in the 1992 Pacific Cup.

He then spent some time at Manly before joining the Counties Manukau Heroes in the new Lion Red Cup. He came off the bench in the 1994 Lion Red Cup grand final loss to the North Harbour Sea Eagles.

Following the World Cup Wolfgramm signed with Swinton.

Wolfgramm played in the 1997 Super League Nines for Tonga.

Wolfgramm also won the 1999 Group 20 Rugby League premiership with the Narrandera Lizards as their Captain/Coach.

He was then included in the 2000 World Cup side.

In 2001, 2003 and 2004 Wolfgramm was part of the West Belconnen Warriors side in the Canberra Raiders Cup. Wolfgramm spent 2002 with the Valley Dragons.

== Return to New Zealand ==
Wolfgramm returned to New Zealand, playing for the Counties Manukau Jetz in the 2006 Bartercard Cup. He played for Tonga in the 2006 Pacific Cup and was man of the match in the final.

He played for the Bay Roskill Vikings between 2010 and 2011 in the Auckland Rugby League's Sharman Cup competition, serving as player-coach.

Wolfgramm, who works as a butcher, was arrested in December 2011 for being involved in a plot to import methamphetamine into New Zealand.
