= Jason Temu =

Cook Islands international rugby league footballer

Personal information
- Born: 17 April 1972 (age 54) Auckland, New Zealand

Playing information
- Height: 180 cm (5 ft 11 in)
- Weight: 100 kg (15 st 10 lb)
- Position: Prop
Club
Years	Team	Pld	T	G	FG	P
19??	Marist Saints
1994	Counties Manukau	22	5	0	0	24
1995–97	Oldham Bears	77	3	0	0	12
1998	Hull Sharks	15	1	0	0	4
1999–00	Newcastle Knights	3	0	0	0	0
2001	New Zealand Warriors	4	0	0	0	0
	Total	121	9	0	0	40
Representative
Years	Team	Pld	T	G	FG	P
1995–00	Cook Islands	3	0	0	0	0

Jason Temu (born 17 April 1972) former Cook Islands rugby league footballer who played as a prop in the 1990s and 2000s. He played at representative level for Cook Islands, and club level for the Marist Saints, Counties Manukau, Oldham Bears, Hull FC, Newcastle Knights and the New Zealand Warriors.

== Background ==
Temu was born in Auckland, New Zealand and is of Cook Islanders descent.

== Early years ==
Temu grew up in New Zealand and played for the Marist Saints in the Auckland Rugby League. In 1994 he followed his coach, Stan Martin, to the Counties Manukau Heroes in the new Lion Red Cup competition. After several strong seasons with the Heroes he was offered a professional contract to play for Oldham in the Championship, and then for the renamed Oldham Bears in the Super League. At Oldham Bears, Temu made an immediate impression, playing the first 22 consecutive games. Temu was to play for the club for the next three years.

In 1995, after his first season with Oldham Bears, Temu was selected for the Cook Island to play in the Emerging Nations Tournament. The Cook Islands won the tournament.

== Hull Sharks and Newcastle Knights ==
In 1998 Temu made the move to the Hull Sharks and the Super League. Temu played 15 games for the club that year.

In 1999 Temu moved to Australia and joined the Newcastle Knights in the National Rugby League competition. His time at the club was plagued by injury and over two seasons he only played 3 first grade games. He was released at the end of 2000.

== World Cup and Warriors ==
At the end of 2000 Temu was selected in the Cook Island team for the World Cup and was made vice-captain of the squad.

The Wigan Warriors were interested in signing Temu, who did not count as a quota player due to the time he had spent in Great Britain. However he was denied a work permit due to the little game time he had had at Newcastle and so the deal fell through.

Instead, Temu signed with the new New Zealand Warriors club and provided experience to the younger props in the side. When not selected by the first grade side he played for the Marist Richmond Brothers in the Bartercard Cup. He played four first grade games for the Warriors and subsequently decided to retire at the end of the 2001 season.
