= Afoa =

Afoa is a surname. Notable people with the surname include:

- Bunty Afoa (born 1996), New Zealand professional rugby league footballer
- Evelina Afoa (born 1998), Samoan Olympic swimmer
- Fa'ausu Afoa (born 1967), former Samoan rugby league footballer
- John Afoa (born 1983), New Zealand rugby union footballer
- Afoa Moega Lutu (born 1947), former American Samoan politician and lawyer
- Nick Afoa (born 1986), New Zealand tenor and former rugby union footballer
