= Wellington City Dukes =

Club information
- Founded: 1994
- Exited: 1996

Former details
- Grounds: Basin Reserve; Rugby League Park
- Coach: James Leuluai/Ken Laban
- Competition: Lion Red Cup

The Wellington City Dukes were a New Zealand rugby league club that represented Wellington City in the Lion Red Cup from 1994 to 1996. In 1997 one of the two Wellington Rugby League sides that competed in the Super League Challenge Cup was also called the Dukes.

== Notable players ==
- Earl Va'a
- Paul Howell
- Arnold Lomax.

== Season Results ==
Season	Pld	W	D	L	PF	PA	PD	Pts	Position	Finals
1994	22	8	0	14	470	508	-38	16	Nine	N/A
1995	22	10	2	10	440	514	-74	22	Seventh	N/A
1996	22	9	0	13	536	532	4	18	Eighth	N/A
