= Auckland City Vulcans =

Club information
- Founded: 1994
- Exited: 1994

Former details
- Ground: Carlaw Park
- Coach: Gary Prohm
- Competition: Lion Red Cup

The Auckland City Vulcans were a New Zealand rugby league club that represented Auckland City in the 1994 Lion Red Cup. They were replaced in 1995 by the Auckland Warriors' Colts team.

== Notable players ==
Notable players included Stacey Jones, Vinnie Weir, Mark Faumuina, Aaron Lester, Danny Lima, Jason Mackie, Doc Murray, Meti Noovao and Mike Setefano.

== Season results ==
Season	Pld	W	D	L	PF	PA	PD	Pts	Position	Finals
1994	22	14	1	7	517	363	154	29	Fifth	Lost Elimination Play-off

== See also ==
- Rugby league in New Zealand
- List of Auckland Vulcans Results
