= Solomon Kiri =

New Zealand rugby league footballer

Personal information
- Born: 26 October 1972 (age 53) Auckland, New Zealand

Playing information
- Position: Centre
Club
Years	Team	Pld	T	G	FG	P
	Mangere East
1994	Counties Manukau	23	12	0	0	48
1996	Western Reds	2	0	0	0	0
1997	Adelaide Rams	10	2	0	0	8
	Total	35	14	0	0	56
Representative
Years	Team	Pld	T	G	FG	P
1991–00	New Zealand Māori

Solomon Kiri (born 26 October 1972) is a New Zealand former professional rugby league footballer who played in the 1990s and 2000s for the Adelaide Rams and the Western Reds.

== New Zealand ==
Kiri played for the Counties Manukau Heroes in the 1994 Lion Red Cup before joining the Auckland Warriors and playing for the Warriors Colts in the 1995 Lion Red Cup grand final. Kiri also represented the New Zealand Māori rugby league team

== Australia ==
In 1996 Kiri played for the Western Reds, playing two first grade games for the club. Kiri joined the new Adelaide Rams franchise in the 1997 Super League (Australia) competition. Kiri played in Adelaide's first ever match which was against North Queensland in round 1 at Dairy Farmers Stadium. Kiri played ten times for the Rams in total.

== Later years ==
Kiri then returned to New Zealand and played for the Otahuhu Leopards. He represented Auckland and the New Zealand Residents in 2000. Kiri was again selected for New Zealand Māori but did not make the team for the World Cup.
