= Aaron Lester =

New Zealand rugby league footballer

Personal information
- Full name: Aaron Lester
- Born: 16 May 1973 (age 53)

Playing information
- Height: 180 cm (5 ft 11 in)
- Weight: 94 kg (14 st 11 lb)
- Position: Hooker
Club
Years	Team	Pld	T	G	FG	P
1994	Auckland City Vulcans	20	9	0	0	36
1996	Auckland Warriors	3	0	0	0	0
1997–07	Whitehaven
	Total	23	9	0	0	36
- Relatives: Stuart Lester (brother)

Aaron Lester (born 16 May 1973) is a New Zealand former professional rugby league footballer. His preferred position was hooker.

His brother, Stuart, played for Wigan.

== New Zealand ==
A Junior Kiwi in 1992, Lester went on to play for the New Zealand Residents in 1994. An Ellerslie junior, he played for the Auckland City Vulcans in the Lion Red Cup in 1994 before being signed to an Auckland Warriors development contract. He debuted for the Warriors in the Australian Rugby League competition in 1996. He played 3 first grade games for the club, starting all of them at Hooker, however he was not re-signed for the 1997 season.

== Whitehaven ==
Instead Lester moved to England, signing for the Whitehaven where he was to become a legend. He went on play for the club for over ten years and formed a strong combination with fellow Kiwis David Fatialofa and Leroy Joe. Lester was the captain of the side from 2000 until his retirement. He led the side to their first ever final in 2004 when Whitehaven made the National League One Grand Final. Injury, including a broken arm in 2006, slowed him down in later years. He finally announced his retirement at the end of the 2007 season. New coach Ged Stokes talked to Lester about coming out of retirement for the 2008 season, however he decided against it.

== Honoured at Whitehaven ==
Aaron Lester is a Whitehaven Hall Of Fame Inductee. He was named at hooker in Whitehaven's Immortals team.
