= Jorgen Rogers =

NZ Maori rugby league player

Personal information
- Born: 11 October 1964 (age 62)
- Height: 177 cm (5 ft 10 in)
- Weight: 85 kg (13 st 5 lb)

Playing information
- Position: Fullback
Club
| Years | Team | Pld | T | G | FG | P |
|---|---|---|---|---|---|---|
| 1989 | Petone Panthers |
| 1990–93 | Wainuiomata Lions |
| 1994 | Manly Sea Eagles | 1 | 0 | 0 | 0 | 0 |
| 1995–96 | Hutt Valley Hawks | 42 | 10 | 9 | 0 | 58 |
| | Total | 43 | 10 | 9 | 0 | 58 |
Representative
| Years | Team | Pld | T | G | FG | P |
| | Wellington |
| | New Zealand Māori |

Jorgen Rogers (born 11 October 1964) is a New Zealand former rugby football player who played rugby league for the Manly-Warringah Sea Eagles.

== Playing career ==
Rogers played both rugby league and rugby union in his youth, representing the Wainuiomata Rugby Club in 1988 before switching codes and playing rugby league for the Wainuiomata Lions. Rogers switched codes because he was stuck behind All Black John Gallagher. With the Lions, Rogers was part of Wellington Rugby League grand final winning sides in 1990 and 1992. Rogers also represented Wellington and the New Zealand Māori side.

Rogers moved to Australia in 1994, joining the Manly-Warringah Sea Eagles. He played one first grade game for the club, starting at fullback.

In 1995 Rogers returned to New Zealand, playing for the Hutt Valley Hawks in the Lion Red Cup.

In 2000 and 2001 Rogers played for the Wainuiomata Lions in the Bartercard Cup.

He played a season of rugby union in 2002 with Oriental Rongotai before retiring. In 2008 he came out of retirement to play several matches for the Wainuiomata Rugby Club premiers.

In 2010 he played for Kapiti-Horowhenua in the New Zealand Touch nationals, making the over-45 men's national team.
