= Henry Suluvale =

Samoan rugby league player (born 1971)

Personal information
- Full name: Henry Suluvale
- Born: 16 September 1971 (age 55) Christchurch, New Zealand

Playing information
- Position: Wing
Club
Years	Team	Pld	T	G	FG	P
1995	Eastern Suburbs	1	0	0	0	0
1996–98	Gold Coast	19	3	0	0	12
	Total	20	3	0	0	12
Representative
Years	Team	Pld	T	G	FG	P
1995	Western Samoa
- Source: As of 4 January 2024

Henry Suluvale (born 16 September 1971) is a former professional rugby league footballer who represented Western Samoa at the 1995 Rugby League World Cup and also the 1995 world sevens. Suluvale played on the wing or in the centres.

== Early years ==
Suluvale was born on 16 September 1971, in Christchurch.

== Playing career ==
Suluvale played 22 games for the Canterbury Country Cardinals in the 1994 Lion Red Cup, scoring 18 tries. He also toured New Zealand and Fiji with Western Samoa in 1994 and represented Canterbury in their Rugby League Cup defence.

Suluvale joined Eastern Suburbs in 1995 later renamed the "Sydney City Roosters" and played mostly reserve grade before signing for Super League.

In 1996, Suluvale signed with the Hunter Mariners before the Superleague war ended the club's season before it began. He instead moved to the Gold Coast, spending two years with the Gold Coast Chargers and played 19 first grade games. Suluvale's last game in first grade was against Parramatta in Round 8 1998 which the Gold Coast lost 24-2.
