= Matthew Tuisamoa =

Western Samoa international rugby league footballer

Personal information
- Born: New Zealand

Playing information
- Position: Stand-off
Club
Years	Team	Pld	T	G	FG	P
	Unknown (ARL)
1994	Counties Manukau	19	4	0	0	16
	Total	19	4	0	0	16
Representative
Years	Team	Pld	T	G	FG	P
1991–9?	Auckland
1994	Western Samoa

Matthew Tuisamoa is a former Western Samoa international rugby league footballer.

== Playing career ==
Tuisamoa played for Auckland in 1991 and 1992. In 1994 he played for the Counties Manukau in the Lion Red Cup, and was selected for Western Samoa when they conducted a tour of New Zealand. That year Tuisamoa also played in the World Sevens for Western Samoa.

In 2001 Tuisamoa played for the Marist-Richmond Brothers in the Bartercard Cup, and the Richmond Bulldogs in the Auckland Rugby League competition.
