= Greg Wolfgramm =

Tonga international rugby league footballer

Personal information
- Born: 20 June 1974 (age 52)

Playing information
- Position: Wing, Centre
Club
Years	Team	Pld	T	G	FG	P
2000–02	Canberra Raiders	29	6	0	0	24
Representative
Years	Team	Pld	T	G	FG	P
1994–00	Tonga	5	0	0	0	0
- Spouse: Victoria Wolfgramm
- Relatives: Willy Wolfgramm (cousin)

Greg Wolfgramm is a New Zealand former professional rugby league footballer who represented Tonga at the 2000 World Cup. He is the cousin of fellow Tongan international Willie.

== Playing career ==
Wolfgramm attended St Paul's College where he played in the halves alongside Stacey Jones.

He played for the Richmond Bulldogs in the 1995 Auckland Rugby League competition.

A former Marist Saints player, Wolfgramm played for the Narrandera Lizards in Group 20 Rugby League in which he won a premiership with the Lizards in 1999.

Wolfgramm joined the Canberra Raiders in 2000 and spent three seasons at the club.

== Representative career ==
Wolfgramm played for Tonga in the 1999 test match against New Zealand. He was then part of the squad for the 2000 World Cup.
