= Meti Noovao =

Cook Islands international rugby league footballer

Personal information
- Born: 8 March 1974 (age 52) Auckland, New Zealand
- Height: 180 cm (5 ft 11 in)
- Weight: 90 kg (14 st 2 lb)

Playing information
- Position: Centre, Five-eighth, Halfback, Hooker, Lock
Club
Years	Team	Pld	T	G	FG	P
19??	Otahuhu Leopards
1994	Auckland City	3	0	0	0	0
1996	Counties Manukau	3	1	5	0	14
1997	Auckland Warriors	1	0	0	0	0
1998	Adelaide Rams	1	0	0	0	0
2000	Burleigh Bears
2002	Otahuhu Leopards
	Total	8	1	5	0	14
Representative
Years	Team	Pld	T	G	FG	P
1995–00	Cook Islands	1	0	0	0	0
- Source: As of 15 December 2008

Meti Noovao is a former Cook Islands international rugby league footballer who played in the 1990s and 2000s. He played at club level for Otahuhu Leopards (two spells), Auckland City, Counties Manukau, Auckland Warriors, Adelaide Rams and Burleigh Bears, as a left-footed goal-kicking centre, or five-eighth, halfback, hooker, lock. His position of preference was at lock, although he was something of a utility player.

His sister Ana was a former netball player, and was the coach of the Cook Islands.

== Background ==
He was born in Auckland, New Zealand.

He is of Cook Island descent.

== New Zealand ==
While growing up in New Zealand Meti played rugby league for the Otahuhu Leopards in the local Auckland tournament. He joined the Auckland City Vulcans in 1994 in the new Lion Red Cup competition. With the entry of the Auckland Warriors into the Australian Rugby League competition he was signed up as a junior. In 1995 he was the captain of the Warriors Colts side, a team which played in the Lion Red Cup, replacing the Vulcans. The team lost the 1995 Grand Final however he managed to score a try, kick a goal and score a field goal for his team. Throughout his junior years he was an outside back, playing in the centres, at five eighth and at half back. He made the Junior Kiwis in 1993.

Again in 1996 he could not break into the Warriors first grade side, although he moved into the forward pack for the first time - playing at both hooker and lock forward. Meti again played in a losing grand final side, this time at Reserve Grade level.

In 1997 he made his first grade rugby league debut, in the new Super League competition. He was limited to only one game off the bench for the Warriors, although he was also involved in the 1997 World Club Championship.

== Australia ==
In 1998 he found himself surplus to requirements in Auckland and so he moved to Australia, signing with the Adelaide Rams. His season was not a success and he played only one first grade game in the new National Rugby League competition. For this game he started at five-eighth.

In 1999 he moved to Queensland and played for the Burleigh Bears in the Queensland Cup.

He played for Otahuhu in the 2002 Bartercard Cup.

== Cook Islands ==
In 1995 Meti represented the Cook Islands, his country of heritage, playing for the Cook Islands at the 1995 Emerging Nations tournament. He was to go on to be a regular fixture in the side, notably representing his nation at the 1996 and 1997 Super League World Nines and the 2000 Rugby League World Cup.
