= Francis Leota =

New Zealand international rugby league footballer

Personal information
- Full name: Francis Poipoi Leota
- Born: 28 May 1964 (age 62) Auckland, New Zealand

Playing information
- Position: Wing, Prop, Second-row
Club
Years	Team	Pld	T	G	FG	P
	Otahuhu
1989–91	Sheffield Eagles
	Salford City Reds
1994	Waikato Cougars	19	4	0	0	16
1996	Counties Manukau	2	1	0	0	4
	Total	21	5	0	0	20
Representative
Years	Team	Pld	T	G	FG	P
1988–93	Auckland
1989–90	New Zealand	3	0	0	0	0

Francis Poipoi Leota is a New Zealand rugby league player who represented New Zealand between 1989 and 1990, including in games that counted towards the 1992 World Cup.

== Early years ==
Leota attended De La Salle College and played rugby union until he was 20.

== Playing career ==
Leota was an Otahuhu Leopards junior, in the Auckland Rugby League competition. He originally played on the wing until he moved into the second row in 1987. He was an Auckland representative and played in three Test matches for the New Zealand national rugby league team between 1989 and 1990. He was a New Zealand Residents representative in 1990 and 1992.

Leota played for the Sheffield Eagles between 1989 and 1991 and also represented the Salford City Reds in England.

In 1993 Leota won the Rothville Trophy for Otahuhu, which is awarded to the ARL's player of the year. Also in 1993 Leota played for Auckland and represented an Otago Invitational XIII that played the New Zealand Māori side.

In 1994 Leota played for the Waikato Cougars in the new Lion Red Cup. He played for the champion Counties Manukau Heroes in 1996.
