= Ben Lythe =

New Zealand rugby league footballer

Personal information
- Born: 14 October 1975 (age 51) West Auckland, New Zealand
- Height: 173 cm (5 ft 8 in)
- Weight: 88 kg (194 lb; 13 st 12 lb)

Playing information
- Position: Halfback
Club
Years	Team	Pld	T	G	FG	P
1995–96	Waitakere City	33	6	139	2	304
1997	Widnes Vikings	9	0	26	1	53
2000	Auckland Warriors	5	0	4	0	8
	Total	47	6	169	3	365
- Source: As of 31 December 2008

Ben Lythe (born 14 October 1975 in New Zealand) is a former professional rugby league footballer. His position of preference was at Halfback. He was also a noted goalkicker.

== Early years ==
Hailing from West Auckland, Lythe played for the Mt Albert Lions and Glenora Bears in the Auckland Rugby League competition and also played for the Waitakere City Raiders in the national Lion Red Cup. He was part of the team that lost the 1996 Lion Red Cup Grand Final, although he kicked three goals in that game. In the Auckland competition he also had some game time at hooker, swapping positions with Duane Mann.

His good performances earned him minor rep honours in 1996, being selected for both the North Zone in the inter zone challenge and the New Zealand XIII in the Pacific Challenge. He was also part of the Lion Red Cup selection that embarrassed the touring Great Britain Lions, drawing with the much more powerful side.

In 1997 he joined the Widnes Vikings in England, linking up with former Raiders teammate Boycie Nelson.

He then returned to New Zealand in 1998 and led the Glenora Bears to the Fox Memorial title, scoring 324 points (more than 130 clear of the next best on the points-scoring list). He also was involved in the Auckland representative side, scoring 98 points in only five games. He married Mardie Harkness in November 1998, however the honeymoon had to be postponed due to an Auckland-Canterbury match the next day.

== Australian competitions ==
In 1999 his point scoring reputation earned him interest from overseas and he joined the Burleigh Bears in the Queensland Cup. The Bears won the competition that year and Lythe was the competition's leading scorer, with over 200 points.

He was signed to a one-year contract in 2000 by the Auckland Warriors, who needed a replacement for the injured Stacey Jones. He played five games for the club, however after Jones returned from injury he found himself surplus to requirements at the Warriors. Due to the Warriors feeder agreements, when he was not selected by the first grade side he was sent to Brisbane Souths to play in the Queensland Cup. He toured Australia with the New Zealand Residents in 2000.

== Return to domestic competition ==
In 2000 he joined the Mt Albert Lions in the new Bartercard Cup competition. At Mt Albert he formed a strong halves combination with Steve Buckingham and the pair led the Lions to three Bartercard Cup titles.

His return to domestic competitions again earned him representative selections and he was part of the New Zealand 'A' side that toured France and the United States in 2002 and was selected for the New Zealand 'A' 2003 tour of Great Britain. However he ended up withdrawing from the 2003 tour due to family reasons. In 2005 he was selected to be part of a Presidents XIII that played a warm up game against the New Zealand Warriors.

He changed codes in 2007, joining the Mahurangi rugby union club as a player-coach. Mahurangi compete in the North Harbour competition.
