= Matthew Sturm =

NZ rugby league footballer

Personal information
- Born: 13 December 1972 (age 53) New Zealand

Playing information
- Height: 177 cm (5 ft 10 in)
- Weight: 95 kg (14 st 13 lb)
- Position: Prop, Second-row
Club
Years	Team	Pld	T	G	FG	P
1987–1993	Marist Saints
1994–1996	Counties Manukau	72	8	25	0	82
1998–1999	Huddersfield Giants	46	8	0	0	32
2000–2002	Workington Town		0	0	0	0
2002–2004	Warrington Wolves	19	0	0	0	0
2004–2005	Leigh Centurions	45	3	0	0	12
	Total	182	19	25	0	126
Representative
Years	Team	Pld	T	G	FG	P
1995–1996	New Zealand Māori

Matthew Sturm (born 13 December 1972) is a former professional rugby league footballer who played in New Zealand and in the Super League. Since 2007 he has been part of the Mount Albert Lions, as a player till 2012 and now part of the coaching staff.

== Playing career ==
=== Early years ===
Sturm was a Marist Saints junior. He played in the inaugural Lion Red Cup season with the Counties Manukau Heroes, starting for the Heroes in the grand final which they lost to North Harbour.

=== English career ===
After standing out in New Zealand, Sturm moved to England and joined the Huddersfield Giants in the Super League. After playing in 46 games for the Giants, Sturm joined Workington Town in the Northern Ford Premiership for the 2000 season.

In 2002 Sturm left Workington for the Warrington Wolves. He played another 19 Super League games over three seasons before again moving on.

In 2004 Sturm joined Leigh and helped them win promotion into the Super League. Sturm played in 45 games for Leigh over the 2004 & 2005 seasons but were relegated at the end of the year.

=== Return to New Zealand ===
Sturm played for the Auckland Lions in the 2007 Bartercard Cup grand final.

He then joined the Mt Albert Lions and played in the Auckland Rugby League competition till 2012 where he retired on a 58–10 win against Glenora Bears in the fox memorial shield grand final. After retirement, he joined the coaching staff at Mt Albert Lions Where he still is at the current day.

== Representative career ==
Sturm represented New Zealand Māori in 1995 and 1996 and the Lion Red Cup XIII in 1995. In 1995 he was part of the Auckland side that won the Rugby League Cup.
