= David Bailey (rugby league) =

New Zealand rugby league footballer

Personal information
- Born: 5 December 1969 (age 56) Auckland, New Zealand

Playing information
- Height: 184 cm (6 ft 0 in)
- Weight: 86 kg (13 st 8 lb; 190 lb)
- Position: Centre
Club
Years	Team	Pld	T	G	FG	P
19??–92	Te Atatu Roosters
1994–95	Rochdale Hornets	6	7	0	0	28
1994–96	Waitakere City	31	29	10	1	137
1995–96	Wakefield Trinity	14	5	0	1	21
1997	Auckland Warriors	3	1	0	0	4
	Total	54	42	10	2	190
Representative
Years	Team	Pld	T	G	FG	P
1991–96	Auckland
1992–93	New Zealand Māori
- Father: Roger Bailey
- Relatives: Bob Bailey (uncle)

David Bailey is a New Zealand former professional rugby league footballer who played in the 1990s and 2000s, as a centre, and also as a five-eighth. He is the son of New Zealand international rugby league footballer; Roger Bailey.

== Early years ==
Bailey was a Te Atatu Roosters junior and played for them in the Auckland competition. Bailey also represented Ponsonby. He made his début for Auckland in 1991 and represented the New Zealand Māori side at the 1992 Pacific Cup.

In the early-nineties he travelled to England and played for the Rochdale Hornets, before returning to New Zealand for the 1994 Lion Red Cup. He played in 17 matches for the Waitakere City Raiders that year, scoring 84 points. At the end of the season he was signed by Wakefield Trinity.

In 1996 he returned to New Zealand, playing again for the Waitakere City Raiders in the Lion Red Cup. He was part of the side that lost the 1996 Grand Final, although he did score a try in that match.

He was an Auckland representative between 1992 and 1996.

== Warrior ==
Bailey joined the Auckland Warriors in 1997 and was expected to push hard for a first grade centre berth. Despite this he only played three games in the Super League that year, starting one at centre.

== Later years ==
In 2001 Bailey played for the Glenora Bears in the Bartercard Cup.

Bailey was then involved with the Ponsonby Ponies of the Auckland Rugby League.
