= Tukere Barlow =

New Zealand rugby league footballer

Personal information
- Born: 17 September 1970 (age 56)

Playing information
- Height: 178 cm (5 ft 10 in)
- Weight: 90 kg (14 st 2 lb)
- Position: Hooker
Club
Years	Team	Pld	T	G	FG	P
	Hamilton City Tigers
1994–96	Waikato Cougars	58
1994–95	Warrington	26	9	0	0	36
	Total	84	9	0	0	36
Representative
Years	Team	Pld	T	G	FG	P
1989–99	Waikato
1992–99	New Zealand Māori

Tukere Barlow (born 17 September 1970) is a New Zealand former professional rugby league footballer who played for Warrington and represented New Zealand Māori.

== Playing career ==
In 1993 Barlow played for the Hamilton City Tigers, who won the Waikato Rugby League Grand Final. He was also selected to play for Waikato. Barlow started as a centre and also played as a lock and stand-off before moving to hooker.

With the launch of the Lion Red Cup in 1994, Barlow joined the Waikato Cougars and scored 12 tries for the club in its first season. Barlow then spent the off season in England with the Warrington Wolves before returning for the 1995 Lion Red Cup season. Tukere Barlow played hooker in Warrington's 10-40 defeat by Wigan in the 1994–95 Regal Trophy Final during the 1994–95 season at Alfred McAlpine Stadium, Huddersfield on Saturday 28 January 1995.

In 1997 he joined the Mangere East Hawks in the Auckland Rugby League competition, the Hawks lost the grand final but Barlow won the competition's Best and Fairest award. Barlow then returned to Waikato, captaining the side to a Grand Final and Rugby League Cup win over Canterbury.

In 1998 Barlow again led Waikato in the New Zealand Rugby League's National Provincial Competition.

In 1999 Barlow, while playing for Otahuhu, made one appearance for Auckland South before moving to Australia and joining the Kellyville Bush Rangers in the Metropolitan Cup.

== Representative career ==
Barlow represented the New Zealand Māori during his long career, making his début in 1992 during the Māori Queen's coronation celebrations. He also played at the 1992 Pacific Cup and against the Great Britain touring side in 1996. His last appearance also came against Great Britain, in 1999.
