= Des Maea =

New Zealand rugby league footballer

Personal information
- Born: 22 March 1969 (age 57)

Playing information
Club
Years	Team	Pld	T	G	FG	P
1990–92	Sheffield Eagles	26	14	0	0	56
1994	Counties Manukau	21	9	0	0	36
1995–96	Hunslet Hawks	33	9	0	0	36
	Total	80	32	0	0	128
Representative
Years	Team	Pld	T	G	FG	P
1995	Western Samoa	1	0	0	0	0

Des Maea (born 22 March 1969) is a New Zealand former professional rugby league footballer.

He played for the Sheffield Eagles in 1993 and in 1994 returned to New Zealand to play for the Counties Manukau Heroes in the Lion Red Cup where he played in 21 matches, scoring 9 tries for the club. He played for the Mangere East Hawks in the Auckland Rugby League competition.

Des Maea was a Samoan international and played at the 1995 Rugby League World Cup. He was in the Auckland Warriors squad for the 1995 Rugby League World Sevens but never played a first grade game for the club. He played 15 Lion Red Cup games for their Colts team in 1995. He also played for the Hunslet Hawks between 1995 and 1996.
