= Hutt Valley Firehawks =

Defunct NZ rugby league club, based in Hutt Valley

Club information
- Nickname: The Dolphins
- Founded: 1994; 32 years ago
- Exited: 1996; 30 years ago

Former details
- Ground: Fraser Park
- Coach: Tyrone Paikea/Mike Edmonds
- Competition: Lion Red Cup

The Hutt Valley Firehawks were a New Zealand rugby league club that represented Hutt Valley in the Lion Red Cup from 1994 to 1996. In 1995 their nickname was shortened to "Hawks" and 1996 they were known as the Hutt Valley Dolphins.

The Wainuiomata Lions were the main feeder club.

== Notable players ==
Notable players included Zane Clark, Paul Howell, Peter Edwards and Denvour Johnston.

== Season Results ==
| Season | Pld | W | D | L | PF | PA | PD | Pts | Position | Finals |
|---|---|---|---|---|---|---|---|---|---|---|
| 1994 | 22 | 9 | 0 | 13 | 458 | 489 | -30 | 18 | Eighth | N/A |
| 1995 | 22 | 13 | 0 | 9 | 544 | 443 | 101 | 26 | Fifth | Lost Elimination Play-off |
| 1996 | 22 | 11 | 2 | 9 | 444 | 469 | -25 | 24 | Sixth | N/A |
