= Waitakere City Raiders =

Defunct NZ rugby league club, based in Waitakere

Club information
- Founded: 1994
- Exited: 1996; 29 years ago

Former details
- Ground(s): Central Park Stadium
- Coach: Ron O'Regan / Del Hughes
- Competition: Lion Red Cup

Records
- Runners-up: 1996
- Minor premierships: 1996

The Waitakere City Raiders were a New Zealand rugby league club that represented Waitakere City in the Lion Red Cup from 1994 to 1996.

== Notable players ==
Notable players included; Boycie Nelson, David Bailey, Ben Lythe, Tony Tuimavave, Robbie and Henry Paul, Willie Swann, Julian O'Neill, Brady Malam, Anthony Swann, Cliff Beverley, Brian Jellick, Fred Robarts and Paki Tuimavave.

== Season Results ==
Season	Pld	W	D	L	PF	PA	PD	Pts	Position	Finals
1994	22	9	1	12	530	487	43	19	Seventh	N/A
1995	22	10	1	11	430	386	44	21	Eighth	N/A
1996	22	19	0	3	697	342	355	38	Minor Premiers	Lost Grand Final
