= Hawke's Bay rugby league team =

Rugby League team

Club information
- Nickname(s): The Unicorns

Current details
- Ground(s): Nelson Park; Park Island
- Coach: Alan Mason
- Competition: New Zealand Rugby League

Records
- Rugby League Cup: 2007

The Hawke's Bay rugby league team are a New Zealand rugby league team that represents the Hawke's Bay Rugby League in New Zealand Rugby League competitions. They are nicknamed the Unicorns. They competed in the Lion Red Cup between 1994 and 1996.

== Lion Red Cup ==
The team competed in all three seasons of the Lion Red Cup but were not very successful, twice finishing ninth out of the twelve teams. Mike Dorreen was part of the 1994 Unicorns side that was coached by Gary Kemble.

Season	Pld	W	D	L	PF	PA	PD	Pts	Position	Finals
1994	22	7	0	15	373	476	-103	14	Tenth	N/A
1995	22	10	1	11	467	486	-19	21	Ninth	N/A
1996	22	7	1	14	377	583	-206	15	Ninth	N/A
