= Martin Moana =

New Zealand rugby league footballer

Personal information
- Born: 13 August 1973 (age 52) Huntly, New Zealand
- Height: 182 cm (6 ft 0 in)
- Weight: 96 kg (15 st 2 lb)

Playing information
- Position: Five-eighth, Loose forward
Club
Years	Team	Pld	T	G	FG	P
	Huntly South (WRL)
1994	Waikato Cougars	22	14	0	0	56
1995	Auckland Warriors	12	1	0	0	4
1996–01	Halifax Blue Sox	186	119	0	1	476
2001	Huddersfield Giants	6	2	0	0	8
2001	Doncaster	14	7	0	0	28
2002	Wakefield Trinity Wildcats	21	10	0	0	40
2003	Halifax Blue Sox	16	7	0	0	28
2003–04	Salford City Reds	9	6	0	0	24
2004–05	Doncaster	39	22	0	0	88
2006–09	Swinton Lions	88	40	0	0	160
	Total	413	228	0	1	912
Representative
Years	Team	Pld	T	G	FG	P
1992–93	Waikato
1994–00	New Zealand Māori	3	0	0	0	0

Martin Moana (born 13 August 1973) is a New Zealand former professional rugby league footballer who was an international representative and played club football in England and New Zealand.

== Early years ==
Moana started his senior career in 1989, playing for Waikato in New Zealand domestic competitions. He made the Northern Zone U13's team in 1986, the New Zealand U15's Schoolboy Kiwis in 1988 and the New Zealand U17's in 1989. He was a Junior Kiwi in 1992, being part of a successful team who defeated the Junior Kangaroos. In 1993 Moana signed with Auckland Warriors, and toured Australia with their development side.

== Waikato and Auckland ==
In the 1994 Lion Red Cup Moana scored 14 tries in 22 games for the Waikato Cougars. He was then selected for the New Zealand Residents' tour of Australia and named in the New Zealand Māori side for the 1994 Pacific Cup in Fiji.

In 1995 he played for the Auckland Warriors, and was in the inaugural side. He also represented New Zealand in the 1995 World Sevens.

== England ==
Moana was not retained by the Warriors at the end of the year and in 1996 he joined Halifax Blue Sox in the Super League competition. He played there for five years and became a legend around Halifax. Moana competed for the Aotearoa Māori at the 2000 Rugby League World Cup.

At the end of 2000 Moana left Halifax, and became something of a rugby league nomad. He spent 2001 at both the Huddersfield Giants and Doncaster, 2002 at the Wakefield Trinity Wildcats, returned briefly to Halifax for the start of 2003 before finishing the season with the Salford City Reds. In 2005 he moved again re-joining Doncaster before seemingly settling at Swinton Lions where he was player of the year in 2006. He remained with the Swinton Lions until his retirement at the end of the 2009 season.

Later life - BBEC

Martin is now employed at a BBEC school as a pastoral manager. He has built a positive rapport with the people of the school. One staff member was quoted as saying "Martin is a top guy,"out.
