= Peter Edwards (rugby league) =

New Zealand international rugby league footballer

Personal information
- Born: 4 July 1969 (age 56) Canterbury Region, New Zealand
- Height: 174 cm (5 ft 9 in)
- Weight: 81 kg (12 st 11 lb)

Playing information
- Position: Fullback, Hooker, Loose forward
Club
Years	Team	Pld	T	G	FG	P
	Upper Hutt Tigers
1994	Hutt Valley Firehawks	21	9	0	2	38
1996–98	Salford City Reds
	Doncaster
	Total	21	9	0	2	38
Representative
Years	Team	Pld	T	G	FG	P
	Wellington
	New Zealand Māori
1993	New Zealand	1	0	0	0	0

Peter Edwards (born 4 July 1969) is a New Zealand former professional rugby league footballer who represented New Zealand in 1993.

== Playing career ==
A product of Manawatu, Edwards played for the Upper Hutt Tigers in the Wellington Rugby League, and was part of the side that won the Appleton Shield in 1993. He then played for Wellington in the 1993 National Provincial Competition, and was selected to trial for the New Zealand national rugby league team. Edwards was subsequently selected to tour Great Britain with the national side and made his Test début against France. Edwards has also represented the New Zealand Māori side.

In 1994 Edwards joined the Hutt Valley Firehawks in the new Lion Red Cup. He was named as Fullback in the Lion Red Cup team of the year and toured Australia with the New Zealand Residents.

Edwards then joined the new Auckland Warriors franchise in the Australian competition, but could not break into the first grade side. Instead Edwards played in the reserve grade team.

In 1995 Edwards moved to England and joined the Salford City Reds in the Super League. Whilst playing for Salford City Reds, Edwards moved into the forward pack, playing at Hooker and Loose forward.

Edwards later played with Doncaster and York before retiring.
