= Bob Bailey (rugby league) =

NZ international rugby league footballer and coach

Personal information
- Full name: Robert Bailey
- Born: New Zealand

Playing information
Club
Years	Team	Pld	T	G	FG	P
	Ponsonby

Coaching information
Representative
Years	Team	Gms	W	D	L	W%
1983–87	Auckland
1990–91	New Zealand	6	3	0	3	50
- Relatives: Roger Bailey (brother); David Bailey (nephew)

Robert Bailey is a New Zealand former rugby league footballer, and coach of the New Zealand national rugby league team.

== Career ==
Bailey played for Ponsonby with his three brothers. Two of them, Roger and Gary, played for New Zealand.

From the Bay Roskill Vikings club, Bailey coached Auckland between 1983 and 1987. During this time Auckland did not lose a provincial or inter-district match, the worst result being a 12-all draw with the South Island in 1985.

Bailey later coached the New Zealand national rugby league team between 1990 and 1991. This included matches that counted towards the 1992 World Cup. He finished his coaching career with an even record of three wins and three losses.

In 2003 Bailey assisted the Russian side in their tour of New Zealand and at the Victory Cup, which they won by defeating British Amateur Rugby League Association.

In 2004 Bailey spent time in Russia, working as the coaching advisor to the Moscow Dynamo club as they competed in the Challenge Cup. He returned later in the year for a one-year spell with the national side.
