= David Fatialofa =

New Zealand rugby league footballer

Personal information
- Born: New Zealand
- Height: 5 ft 11 in (180 cm)
- Weight: 16 st 7 lb (105 kg)

Playing information
- Position: Prop
Club
Years	Team	Pld	T	G	FG	P
1996–08	Whitehaven	293	26	0	0	108

David Fatialofa is a New Zealand rugby league player who played professionally in England for Whitehaven.

== Playing career ==
Fatialofa was an Auckland Warriors junior and played in the 1995 Lion Red Cup final. He also represented the Junior Kiwis in 1992 and 1993 and played in France during the 1995/96 season.

He then moved to England, joining the Whitehaven under New Zealand coach Stan Martin.

He was named in the 2000 World Cup train on squad for Samoa but did not make the final squad.

In 2005 Fatialofa won the club's Player of Year award.

He retired at the end of the 2008 season.

He returned in 2010 to play for Whitehaven in a testimonial match for Neil Frazer.
