= Brian Laumatia =

Samoa international rugby league footballer

Playing information
- Position: Wing
Club
Years	Team	Pld	T	G	FG	P
	Mangere East Hawks
1994	Counties Manukau	25	16	0	0	34
1995–97	Cronulla Sharks	7	1	0	0	4
	Total	32	17	0	0	38
Representative
Years	Team	Pld	T	G	FG	P
1994	Auckland	1	0	0	0	0
1992–95	Samoa	2	1	0	0	4

Brian Laumatia is a former professional rugby league footballer who played for the Cronulla Sharks in the Super League in Australia.

== Playing career ==
In 1994 he played for the Counties Manukau Heroes in the Lion Red Cup, and represented Auckland.

Laumatia was a Samoan international and played at the 1992 Pacific Cup, and the 1995 World Cup.

== Later years ==
Since retiring he has joined the New Zealand Police, and currently is the Captain-Coach of the Counties-Manukau Police rugby league team.
