= Maika Felise =

Samoa international rugby league footballer

Personal information
- Born: Western Samoa

Playing information
Representative
Years	Team	Pld	T	G	FG	P
1994–00	Western Samoa/Samoa

Maika Felise is a Samoan former professional rugby league footballer who played in the 1990s and 2000s. He represented Samoa in the 2000 World Cup.

== Playing career ==
Felise played for Wainuiomata Lions in the Wellington Rugby League competition, representing the Lions at the 1993 Rugby League World Sevens.

In 1994 he won the Colin O'Neil Trophy as the best and fairest player in the competition.

In 2000 Felise played for Beacon Hill Bears in the Manly Warringhah A grade competition.

In 2004 he was named in the Manly A Grade representative team that played a touring British Amateur Rugby League Association side.

== Representative career ==
Felise made his debut for Western Samoa when he was called up to the Samoan squad during their 1994 tour of New Zealand as injury cover.

He was named in the Samoa squad for the 2000 Rugby League World Cup but did not play a game.

== Later years ==
Felise represented Samoa in surfing at the 2007 South Pacific Games.
