= Simon Angell =

New Zealand international rugby league footballer (born 1970)

Personal information
- Full name: Simon Alexander Angell
- Born: 12 November 1970 (age 55) Balclutha, New Zealand
- Height: 194 cm (6 ft 4 in)
- Weight: 110 kg (17 st 5 lb)

Playing information
- Position: Prop, Second-row
Club
Years	Team	Pld	T	G	FG	P
1989–98	Hornby (CRL)
1994	Christchurch City	15	10	0	1	41
1995–96	Featherstone Rovers	7	0	0	0	0
1996–97	Salford City Reds	6
	Total	28	10	0	1	41
Representative
Years	Team	Pld	T	G	FG	P
1989–97	Canterbury	32	7	0	0	28
1993	New Zealand	0	0	0	0	0

Simon Alexander Angell is a New Zealand former professional rugby league footballer who played in the 1980s and 1990s. He played representative level for New Zealand and Canterbury, and at club level for Hornby (of the Canterbury Rugby League), Christchurch City, Featherstone Rovers and Salford City Reds, as a prop or second-row.

== Playing career ==
From the Hornby club, Angell played for the Canterbury side that bet Auckland in 1993, starting in the second row in the Provincial grand final.

He played for the Christchurch City Shiners in the 1994 Lion Red Cup.

Angell was then signed to the Auckland Warriors in 1995 but did not play in the first grade team. He signed with Featherstone Rovers for the 1995/96 season but in February 1996 Featherstone had to cut his contract as a cost-cutting measure. Angell played the rest of the 1996 season with the Salford City Reds and remained there for 1997.

He then returned to Canterbury and resumed his provincial representative career. In 1998 he played for the Tasman Orcas as an import player while playing for the Hornby Panthers in the Canterbury Rugby League.

Between 1999 and 2003 Angell played for the Canning Bulldogs in the Western Australia Rugby League competition.

== Representative career ==
Angell was named in the touring squad for the 1993 New Zealand national rugby league team tour of Great Britain and France, however Angell did not play a test while on tour. He did however wear the Kiwis colours on several tour matches and is Kiwi number 651.
