= Jason Mackie =

New Zealand rugby league footballer

Personal information
- Full name: Jason James Mackie
- Born: 25 December 1968 (age 57) New Zealand

Playing information
- Height: 183 cm (6 ft 0 in)
- Weight: 100 kg (15 st 10 lb)
- Position: Lock
Club
Years	Team	Pld	T	G	FG	P
	Takahiwai Warriors
1994	Auckland City	9	2	0	0	8
1995	Auckland Warriors	5	0	0	0	0
	Total	14	2	0	0	8
Representative
Years	Team	Pld	T	G	FG	P
1990–97	Northland	18	14	0	0	56
1990–93	New Zealand Māori
1993	New Zealand	5	2	0	0	8

Jason James Mackie (born 25 December 1968) is a New Zealand former rugby league footballer.

== Playing career ==
He represented Northland 18 times between 1990 and 1993 scoring 14 tries. During the 1991 season he was based in Devonport with the Navy and traveled to Whangarei for matches and training. In 1993 he captained the province to the North Island Second Division title and was also the player-coach of the Takahiwai Warriors who won the Northland Rugby League club competition. In 1990 Mackie represented the New Zealand Māori side against the touring Great Britain side. He later played in the 1992 Pacific Cup.

In 1993 he was the only second division player to be selected on the New Zealand national rugby league team tour of Great Britain and France and became Northland's first ever test player. He played in all four tests on tour, and was the Kiwis' leading try-scorer.

In 1994 he was signed by the Auckland Warriors who were to enter the Australian Rugby League premiership in 1995. He moved south to Auckland and played for the Auckland City Vulcans in the 1994 Lion Red Cup. He was in the inaugural team for the Warriors when they made their debut in March, 1995. However, he played the majority of his Warriors career in the reserve grade team and was released in June 1996.

In 1997 he again represented Northland.
