= Roger Bailey (rugby league) =

Former NZ & Maori international rugby league coach & player

Personal information
- Full name: Roger Wayne Bailey
- Born: 1 January 1942 (age 84)

Playing information
- Position: Centre
Club
Years	Team	Pld	T	G	FG	P
	Ponsonby United
	Maritime
	Total	0	0	0	0	0
Representative
Years	Team	Pld	T	G	FG	P
	Auckland
1961–70	New Zealand	30	12	0	0	36
	New Zealand Māori
- Relatives: David Bailey (son); Bob Bailey (brother)

Roger Wayne Bailey is a New Zealand former rugby league footballer and coach who represented New Zealand thirty times between 1961 and 1970. His brother Gary also played for New Zealand while his brother Bob later coached New Zealand and his son David was also a professional player. Bailey is of New Zealand Māori descent.

== Playing career ==
A member of the Ponsonby club, Bailey was an Auckland representative and was first picked for the New Zealand national rugby league team in 1961. He went on to play thirty test matches for the Kiwis and, in 1967, captained the Kiwis in two matches. Bailey also represented the New Zealand Māori side.

In 1973 Bailey won the Hyland Memorial Cup as coach of the year in the Auckland Rugby League competition.

He joined the Maritime club in 1975.

== Awards ==
Bailey was inducted as a New Zealand Rugby League "Legend of League" in 1995 and is an Auckland Rugby League Immortal.

In 2007 he was named in the New Zealand Rugby League Team of the Century at centre.
