= Mark Faumuina =

Western Samoa international rugby league rubgbyman

Personal information
- Born: 2 October 1971 (age 54)
- Height: 187 cm (6 ft 2 in)
- Weight: 102 kg (16 st 1 lb)

Playing information
- Position: Prop, Second-row
Club
Years	Team	Pld	T	G	FG	P
1988–93	Otahuhu Leopards
1994	Auckland City	19	1	0	0	4
1995–96	Counties Manukau
1996–98	Penrith Panthers
1998–03	Toulouse Olympique
2003–05	Villefranche XIII Aveyron
2006–06	Gratentour XIII
	Total	19	1	0	0	4
Representative
Years	Team	Pld	T	G	FG	P
1993–95	Auckland
1992	Western Samoa

Coaching information
Club
Years	Team	Gms	W	D	L	W%
2021–21	Villefranche XIII Aveyron	4			4

Mark Faumuina (born 2 October 1971) is a former Western Samoa international rugby league footballer.

== Playing career ==
An Otahuhu Leopards junior, Faumuina represented Auckland, playing for the Under 17's in 1987 and the under 18's in 1991.

In 1993 Faumuina played for the Probables side in the New Zealand national rugby league team trial match. He did not however make the national side.

In 1994 he played for the Auckland City Vulcans in the new Lion Red Cup. He was then picked to be part of the Western Samoan side as it conducted a tour of New Zealand. He then played in the 1992 Pacific Cup.

In 1995 Faumuina played for the Counties Manukau Heroes. He was picked to play for the Lion Red XIII against a Tongan Residents side and also represented Auckland in its Rugby League Cup challenge.

Faumuina played against the touring Great Britain side in 1996, again representing the New Zealand Residents. He then signed a contract with the Penrith Panthers but did not make the first grade side.

Faumuina later played in France before retiring. In 2003 he played for a French Selection against a touring New Zealand Māori side.
