= Jason Palmada =

New Zealand rugby league footballer

Personal information
- Born: 26 December 1969 (age 56) New Zealand

Playing information
- Height: 185 cm (6 ft 1 in)
- Weight: 95 kg (14 st 13 lb)
- Position: Second-row
Club
Years	Team	Pld	T	G	FG	P
	Runanga (WCRL)
	Northcote Tigers
1994–95	North Harbour	44	15	0	0	60
1996	Workington Town
	Total	44	15	0	0	60
Representative
Years	Team	Pld	T	G	FG	P
	West Coast
1992–??	Auckland
- Source: RLP

Jason Palmada (born 26 December 1969) is a New Zealand former rugby league footballer.

== Playing career ==
A West Coast representative before moving to Auckland, Palmada was also a Junior Kiwi.

Palmada played for the North Harbour Sea Eagles in the first two season of the Lion Red Cup. He played in both of the Grand Finals which were both won by the Sea Eagles. In 1995 he was selected in the New Zealand Residents side.

In 1996 Palmada moved to England, joining Workington Town in the Super League competition.

Palmada returned to New Zealand in 1998, joining Canterbury.

He now lives in Australia.
