= Paul Howell (rugby league) =

New Zealand rugby league footballer

Personal information
- Born: 6 December 1969 (age 56) New Zealand

Playing information
- Position: Stand-off, Halfback, Hooker
Club
| Years | Team | Pld | T | G | FG | P |
|---|---|---|---|---|---|---|
| | Petone |
| 1994 | Wellington City | | 14 | | | 160 |
| 1995 | Hutt Valley | | | | | 136 |
| 1996 | Wellington City | | | | | 204 |
| 1997–98 | Widnes | 16 | 6 | 35 | 0 | 94 |
| | Total | 16 | 20 | 35 | 0 | 594 |
Representative
| Years | Team | Pld | T | G | FG | P |
| 1993–99 | Wellington |
| 1993–98 | New Zealand Māori | 2 | 1 | 10 | 0 | 24 |

Paul Howell (born 6 December 1969) is a New Zealand former professional rugby league footballer who played in the Lion Red Cup, and for the Widnes Vikings.

== Playing career ==
Howell played for the Petone Panthers, and represented Wellington.

With the creation of the Lion Red Cup in 1994, Howell joined the Wellington City Dukes club. Howell was named the Lion Red Cup's best and fairest after the 1994 season, scoring 160 points, including 14 tries.

Howell joined the Hutt Valley Hawks for the 1995 season, scoring 136 points that year. He returned to the Dukes side for 1996, and again won the best and fairest award.

At the conclusion of the Lion Red Cup, Howell was the competition's leading point scorer, with 500 points, the leading try scorer, with 36, and fourth on the all-time appearances list, with 66.

In 1998 Howell played for the Widnes Vikings.

== Representative career ==
In 1993 Howell was selected for the New Zealand Māori team that toured New Zealand. He then was part of the side that competed at the 1994 Pacific Cup.

In 1996 Howell played for the New Zealand Māori side that upset the touring Great Britain side 40–28. Howell kicked six goals in the victory. He also played for the Māori in the 1996 Pacific Challenge and in a match against Papua New Guinea.

In 1998, Howell captained New Zealand Māori tours of the Cook Islands and Papua New Guinea.
