= Ken McIntosh =

New Zealand rugby league footballer and coach

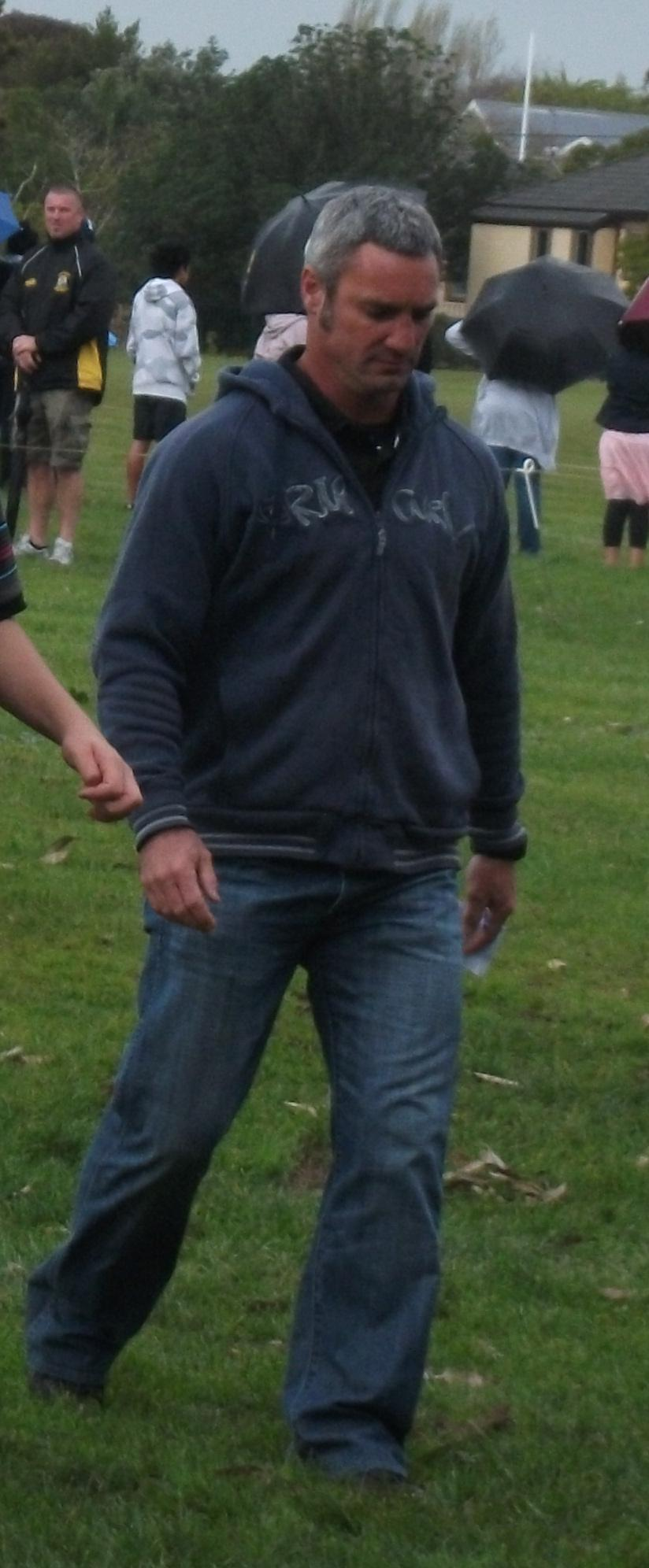

Personal information
- Full name: Kenneth McIntosh
- Born: New Zealand

Playing information
Club
| Years | Team | Pld | T | G | FG | P |
|---|---|---|---|---|---|---|
| | Northcote Tigers |
| 1990–91 | Carlisle RLFC |
| 1994 | North Harbour | 24 | 3 | 1 | 1 | 15 |
| 1995 | Penrith Panthers | 2 | 0 | 0 | 0 | 0 |
| | Total | 26 | 3 | 1 | 1 | 15 |
Representative
| Years | Team | Pld | T | G | FG | P |
| 1992 | Auckland |
| | New Zealand Māori |
- Source: As of 2 November 2025

Kenneth McIntosh is a New Zealand rugby league coach and former player who currently coaches the East Coast Bays Barracudas. He played professionally with the Penrith Panthers.

== Playing career ==
McIntosh began his career with the Northcote Tigers in the Auckland Rugby League. He was part of the Tigers team that won the Fox Memorial trophy, something which he rates the highlight of his career. He also represented Auckland and New Zealand Māori while playing for the Tigers, including at the 1992 Pacific Cup.

McIntosh then joined the North Harbour Sea Eagles and was part of the team that won the inaugural Lion Red Cup in 1994. After this he was signed by the Penrith Panthers in the Australian Rugby League. However he only played two first grade games in 1995 and was not retained by the club.

McIntosh finished his career with the Wentworthville Magpies, where he won two Metropolitan Cups.

McIntosh then returned to his Northcote Tigers club and played in the Bartercard Cup.

== Coaching career ==
McIntosh moved into coaching and coached his old club, the Northcote Tigers. He won a Prime Minister's scholarship in 2006 and spent three days at the Brisbane Broncos with Wayne Bennett.

He was the coach of the North Harbour Tigers and Harbour League in the Bartercard Cup.

In 2010 he was appointed the coach of Auckland for the inaugural Albert Baskerville Trophy competition.

Since 2012 he has coached the East Coast Bays Barracudas.
