= Peter Lima =

Samoan rugby league footballer

Personal information
- Born: Western Samoa

Playing information
- Position: Wing, Centre
Club
Years	Team	Pld	T	G	FG	P
1994	Waitakere City	14	2	0	0	8
1996	Gold Coast Chargers	2	0	0	0	0
	Total	16	2	0	0	8
Representative
Years	Team	Pld	T	G	FG	P
1993	Auckland
2000	Samoa	2	0	0	0	0

Peter Lima is a Samoan former professional rugby league footballer who played in the 1990s and 2000s, representing Samoa at the 2000 World Cup.

== Playing career ==
Lima played for the Auckland side in the 1993 National Provincial Competition, and also made the Junior Kiwis. Lima also played for Western Samoa at the 1993 World Sevens.

Lima played two matches for the Gold Coast Chargers in 1996. He played for the Burleigh Bears in the 1998 Queensland Cup.

In 2000 Lima was selected for the Samoan squad for the World Cup, and played in two matches for his country.
