= Brady Malam =

New Zealand international rugby league footballer

Personal information
- Born: 14 March 1973 (age 53) New Zealand

Playing information
- Height: 185 cm (6 ft 1 in)
- Weight: 105 kg (16 st 7 lb)
- Position: Prop, Hooker
Club
Years	Team	Pld	T	G	FG	P
	Glenora Bears
1994	Waitakere City	1	0	0	0	0
1996–99	Auckland Warriors	55	0	0	0	0
2000	Wigan Warriors	25	1	0	0	4
	Total	81	1	0	0	4
Representative
Years	Team	Pld	T	G	FG	P
1992–93	Auckland	12	2	0	0	8
1997	New Zealand (TS)	2	0	0	0	0
- Source: RLP

Brady Malam (born 14 March 1973) is a New Zealand former rugby league footballer. His preferred position was prop.

== Early years ==
A junior from the Glenora club, Malam played for Auckland at hooker before bulking up and moving to prop in his late teens. He played for the Junior Kiwis in 1992 and 1993. In the 1994 Lion Red Cup Malam played one match for the Waitakere City Raiders.

== Auckland Warriors ==
In 1996 he made his Australian Rugby League début for the Auckland Warriors and was a key part of the reserve grade team that made the grand final. He was also named Development Player of the Year. He went on to play 55 games for the Warriors, both from the bench and starting at prop. In 1997, during the Super League war, he made his début for New Zealand in the triseries against Queensland and New South Wales.

== Wigan Warriors ==
In 2000 he moved to England to play for the Wigan Warriors in the Super League. He made 25 appearances and played for the Wigan Warriors from the interchange bench in their 2000 Super League Grand Final loss against St Helens R.F.C. He was released by the club at the end of the year.
