= Gus Malietoa-Brown =

Western Samoa international rugby league footballer

Personal information
- Born: 28 July 1975 (age 51)
- Height: 180 cm (5 ft 11 in)
- Weight: 95 kg (14 st 13 lb)

Playing information
- Position: Centre, Five-eighth, Lock
Club
Years	Team	Pld	T	G	FG	P
1994	Counties Manukau	13	4	0	0	16
1996	Counties Manukau	13	14	0	0	56
	Total	26	18	0	0	72
Representative
Years	Team	Pld	T	G	FG	P
	Western Samoa

Gus Mailetoa-Brown (born 28 July 1975) is a former Western Samoa international rugby league footballer.

== Playing career ==
A Manurewa and Papakura junior, Mailetoa-Brown first attracted interest from the Brisbane Broncos. However, by 1994 he was playing for the Counties Manukau Heroes in the Lion Red Cup. He was signed with the Auckland Warriors in 1995 but never played a first grade game for the club and was released in June 1996. He scored two tries in the 1996 Lion Red Cup grand final, being part of the Counties Manukau side that lifted the trophy.

While playing for the Eastern Tornadoes in 1999, Malietoa-Brown represented Auckland South.

He played for the Mt Albert Lions in the 2004 Bartercard Cup. Malietoa-Brown later played club games for the Manurewa Marlins in the Auckland Rugby League competition, including in 2011.

== Representative career ==
Mailetoa-Brown was a Samoan international and played at the 1995 Rugby League World Cup.

== Personal life ==
Malietoa-Brown, grew up in Manurewa and is the grandson of Malietoa Tanumafili II. Malietoa-Brown is also first cousins to both Nigel and Joe Vagana. Gus attended De La Salle College in Auckland.
