= Leroy Joe =

Cook Islands international rugby league footballer

Personal information
- Full name: Leroy Joe
- Born: 31 December 1974 (age 51) New Zealand

Playing information
- Position: Halfback, Scrum-half
Club
Years	Team	Pld	T	G	FG	P
1998–99	Whitehaven R.L.F.C.	79	24	2	3	103
2000	Hull Kingston Rovers	30	9	0	1	37
2001–10	Whitehaven R.L.F.C.	270	85	4	7	355
	Total	379	118	6	11	495
Representative
Years	Team	Pld	T	G	FG	P
1994	New Zealand Māori
2000	Cook Islands	3	1	0	0	4
- Source: As of 11 June 2026

Leroy Joe is a former Cook Islands international rugby league footballer who played as a scrum-half in the 1990s, 2000s and 2010s. He played at club level in England for Whitehaven (League 1), and Hull Kingston Rovers.

== Background ==
Joe was born in New Zealand.

He is of Cook Islands descent.

== Playing career ==
While playing for the Otahuhu Leopards in 1994 Joe was selected to represent New Zealand Māori at the Pacific Cup.

In 1995 he played for the Counties Manukau Heroes in the Lion Red Cup.

He is a former Otahuhu Leopards junior and has represented the Cook Islands, including at the 2000 World Cup.
