= Danny Lima =

Samoa international rugby league footballer

Personal information
- Full name: Danny Lima
- Born: 27 July 1975 (age 51) Western Samoa

Playing information
- Height: 183 cm (6 ft 0 in)
- Weight: 110 kg (17 st 5 lb)
- Position: Prop
Club
Years	Team	Pld	T	G	FG	P
19??	Otahuhu Leopards
1994	Auckland City Vulcans	8	0	0	0	0
1995–96	Eastern Suburbs	7	0	0	0	0
1998	Canberra Raiders	2	9	0	0	0
2001–02	Northern Eagles	26	1	0	0	4
2003	Manly Sea Eagles	17	4	0	0	16
2004–06	Warrington Wolves	62	9	0	0	36
2006	Salford City Reds	9	0	0	0	0
2007	Wakefield Trinity Wildcats	3	0	0	0	0
	RC Albi	0	0	0	0	0
	SO Avignon	0	0	0	0	0
	Total	134	23	0	0	56
Representative
Years	Team	Pld	T	G	FG	P
1995–2004	Samoa	6	2	0	0	0

Danny Lima (born 27 July 1975) is a Samoan former professional rugby league footballer who played as a prop in the 1990s and 2000s. He was a Samoa international.

== Background ==
Lima was born in Samoa.

== Playing career ==
Lima played at club level in Australasia for the Otahuhu Leopards, the Auckland City Vulcans, the Sydney Roosters, the Canberra Raiders, the Manly Sea Eagles, the Northern Eagles with whom he played in the club's last ever game a 68–28 loss against Penrith and Melbourne Storm, and in the Super League for the Warrington Wolves, the Salford City Reds and the Wakefield Trinity Wildcats.

Lima coached at Warrington Wizards before taking up a playing role in France. He played for RC Albi in France but left after the club went under liquidation, as well as SO Avignon.
