= Samoa national rugby league team =

Rugby league team that represents Samoa in rugby league football

Samoa

Team information
- Nickname: Toa Samoa
- Governing body: Rugby League Samoa
- Region: Asia-Pacific
- Head coach: Ben Gardiner
- Captain: Jarome Luai & Junior Paulo
- Most caps: Junior Paulo (19)
- Top try-scorer: Tim Lafai (9)
- Top point-scorer: Stephen Crichton (77)
- IRL ranking: 4th

Uniforms
First colours	Second colours

Team results
- First game
- Western Samoa 34–12 Tokelau (Rarotonga, Cook Islands; 1986)
- Biggest win
- France 4–78 Samoa (Sydney, Australia; 16 October 2026)
- Biggest defeat
- New Zealand Māori 70-10 Samoa (Auckland, New Zealand; 21 October 2004)
- World Cup
- Appearances: 6 (first time in 1995)
- Best result: Runners-Up (2021)

The Samoa National Rugby League Team (Samoan: ʻau lakapī līkī o Sāmoa) represents Samoa in rugby league football and has participated in international competition since 1986. Known as Western Samoa (Samoan: Sāmoa i Sisifo) before 1997, the team is administered by Rugby League Samoa and are nicknamed Toa Sāmoa (Samoan: [ˈto.a ˈsaː.mo.a], lit. 'Samoan Warriors').

== History ==
Western Samoa made their debut in the 1986 Pacific Cup. Joe Raymond coached this side to a final where they went down to a strong NZ Maori side. Joe Raymond went on to coach them again in 1988 and would return again to coach them 10 years later in 1998 in a one-off game against a Samoan team of Samoan resident players at Carlaw park.

William John "Swanny" Stowers and his wife Lyndsay Stowers operated Samoa Rugby League out of their North Shore home in Auckland and from the Richmond Rugby League Club house where Lyndsay ran the canteen. This resilient couple were known to have put a mortgage on their home to assist with funding the thirty (30) men representing Samoa in the Pacific Cup held in Tonga, 1990. This commitment lead to a historical win over the Maori team for the first time and a win in the 1990 Pacific Cup. Coached by the Richmond Bulldogs Head Coach, Steve Kaiser.

Samoa then won the 1992 Pacific Cup over Tonga in an action filled thriller that went into two (2) overtimes and sent the NZ Rugby League and Polynesian rugby league public into a frenzy. The 1992 Tournament showcased all of NZ Rugby league talent and Australian Rugby league scouts were already booked to witness the 1994 Pacific Cup held in Fiji.

In 1993 Western Samoa were invited to the International Coca-Cola Sevens in Sydney. With Auckland based Samoan players such as Mark Elia, Tony Tuimavave, Tony Tatupu, Faausu Afoa and Des Maea followed by a group of up and coming players such as Matthew TuiSamoa, Lionel Perera, Aleki Maea, Paki Tuimavave, Joe Vagana, Sefo Fuimaono and Peter Lima, the team beat the Canberra Raiders and the Great Britain International team. Coached by the Richmond Bulldogs' Head Coach Steve Kaiser, this team gave Samoa the status to create the strong foundation Western Samoa Rugby League needed to move forward. Below this strong foundation however was the strength and commitment of two people: Swanny and Lyndsay Stowers. These two held together the concept of Samoa Rugby League and without their dream, Samoa RL will not be where it is today.

Steve Kaiser in his sixth year as the Samoan Coach had an array of NZ based quality players for the 1994 Pacific Cup with the likes of Se'e Solomona, Tony Tatupu, the Tuimavave brothers Paki and Tony plus consistent local team members including Mike Setefano, Matthew TuiSamoa, Alex Tupou and Mark Faumuina. Henry Suluvale and Rudy David led the contingent of first class players from Canterbury however they were matched by the Tongan players Jim Dymock, John Hopoate, Solomon Haumono and Albert Fulivai.

The 1995 Samoan team had the benefit of ex-All Blacks John Schuster and Va'aiga Tuigamala in their backline. When rugby union went openly professional players such as Apollo Perelini and Fereti Tuilagi left rugby league to return to the 15-man game.

Samoa lost the Pacific Cup in 1996.

The 1998 Pacific Cup team saw a new and old talent. Joe Raymond, one of the first Samoan Rugby League Rep coaches returned after coaching Tonga and the NZ Maori, the late Eddie Poching managed the team and the introduction of Francis Meli to Samoan Rugby League and Junior Papalii a loyal American Samoan Representative. Pati Tuimavave from the 1992 squad and Matthew TuiSamoa, the only survivor from 1990 Pacific Cup champion team returned. Samoa battled Tonga for the 1998 Pacific Cup again at Carlaw park and again Samoa regained the Pacific Champions Title.

The Pacific Cup was taken to Australia's Gold Coast in 2000 where Auckland coach John Ackland took over the reins. Ackland added another dimension to Samoa Rugby League in selecting rising stars Itikeri Samani a Canberra and Goulburn Stockmen Junior who previously represented American Samoa and Wayne McDade from the New Zealand Warriors while bringing back Matthew tuiSamoa into the Pacific Cup arena.

Samoa took on Ireland, Scotland, and the Aotearoa Māori in the 2000 Rugby League World Cup pool stages. They would lose to 'the Irish' in their opening game, but they'd beat NZ Maori, and Scotland in their next two games, sealing a place in the knock-out stages. They would take on Australia in the quarter-final. Unfortunately, they ended their tournament with a thrashing 66–10 defeat (their biggest defeat up to date), sealing an end to a respectable World Cup Campaign.

Samoa played in the Pacific Pool of the 2008 Rugby League World Cup Qualifiers. They beat the Cook Islands and Fiji, but lost to Tonga. On a points difference, Samoa came in third and had to play USA in the Repecharge Semi-final. Samoa won this match 42–10 and then played Lebanon on 14 November 2007 in the Repecharge Final to see who would take the 10th and final World Cup place. Samoa came out eventual winners of the 10th and final 2008 Rugby League World Cup place beating Lebanon 38–16 at the Chris Moyles Stadium, Featherstone.

For the 2008 Rugby League World Cup tournament Samoa's main jersey sponsor was the Samoa International Finance Authority.

Samoa took on Tonga and Ireland in the Tournament's pool stages. They beat their Pacific rivals 20–12, but they then lost to the Irish by 34–16. This big losing margin, sent the Samoans into battle against the French in the Tournament's 9th place play-off. Samoa easily won, winning 42–10 and capping off an undesirable World Cup Tournament.

In April 2013, Samoa took on Tonga in the '2013 Pacific Rugby League Test' at Penrith Stadium. The International was created as a World Cup warm-up match. Tonga targeted Samoa's weak defence, and it paid off, thrashing the Toa Samoans by 36–4.

Australian Matt Parish was appointed head coach ahead of the 2013 World Cup. In the group stage, Samoa lost to New Zealand 42–24, and defeated Papua New Guinea 38–4 and France 22–6. They lost the quarter-final to Fiji 22–4.

In May 2014, Samoa defeated Fiji 32–16 in a one-off Test match to qualify for the 2014 Four Nations. In the Four Nations, Samoa was the fourth nation and the underdogs against rugby league's three big heavyweight nations England, New Zealand and Australia. But they proved that they were anything but underdogs, losing to England by six points in a sea-sawing battle, and they were within four minutes of creating rugby league history by beating New Zealand. By the final round, Samoa still had a chance to qualify for the final, making this Four Nations the toughest ever. This Samoan performance added credential to the rugby league game showing that the game is not all about the big three. An annual series against New Zealand was proposed to run likewise to Australia's State of Origin series.

In May 2015, Samoa took on Tonga. The game was an absolute thriller with the lead alternating between the teams and the biggest margin throughout the match was only 6 points. Samoa won 18–16. The following year, in May 2016, Samoa defeated Tonga 18–12.

Samoa were winless at the 2017 World Cup, losing 38–8 to New Zealand and 32–18 Tonga, and drawing 14–14 with Scotland. However, due to the tournament structure, they advanced to the knock-out stage thanks to the draw. In the quarter-final, Samoa lost 46–0 to defending champions Australia. Former rugby league players Reni Maitua and Willie Mason were heavily critical of the team after the tournament, claiming the players were staying up late at night and had no respect for coach Matt Parish.

In February 2021, it was reported that 34 current and former Samoan players had co-signed a letter to Samoan Prime Minister Tuilaepa Aiono Sailele Malielegaoi requesting for Parish to be removed as coach, citing a lack of professionalism and success. Parish responded by claiming the players were coerced to sign the letter. In May 2021, Andrew Johns, Matthew Johns and Sonny Bill Williams voiced interest to jointly coach Samoa at the 2021 World Cup. Rugby League Samoa affirmed Parish would remain as head coach for the tournament in a statement. NRL.com noted that Samoa has approximately 85 NRL players to choose from in 2021, more than is available for the successful Tongan (60) and Fijian (40) teams, however, according to reports, there are some players not willing to represent Samoa under the current coaching set-up.

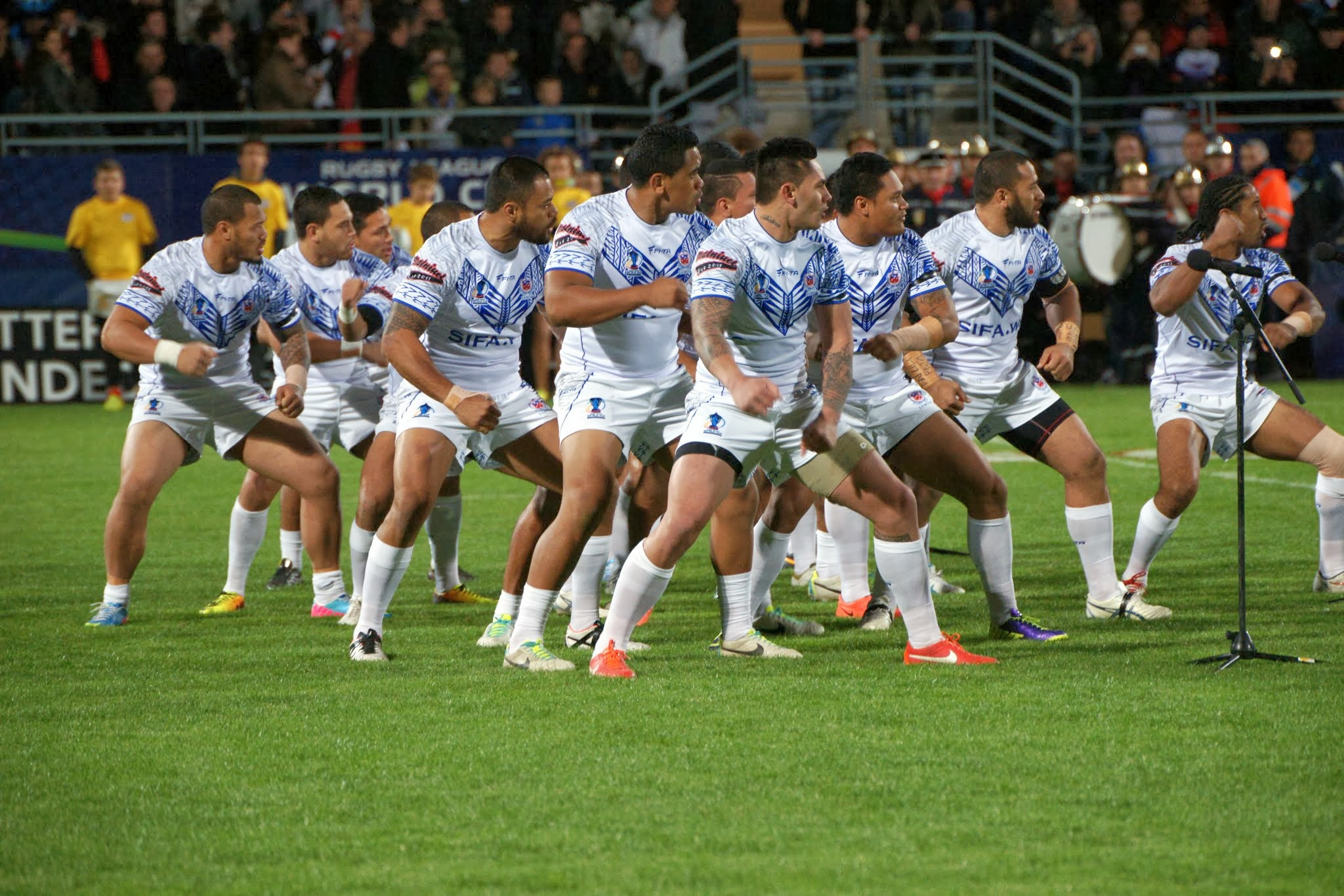
Samoa performing the Siva Tau against France at the 2013 Rugby League World Cup

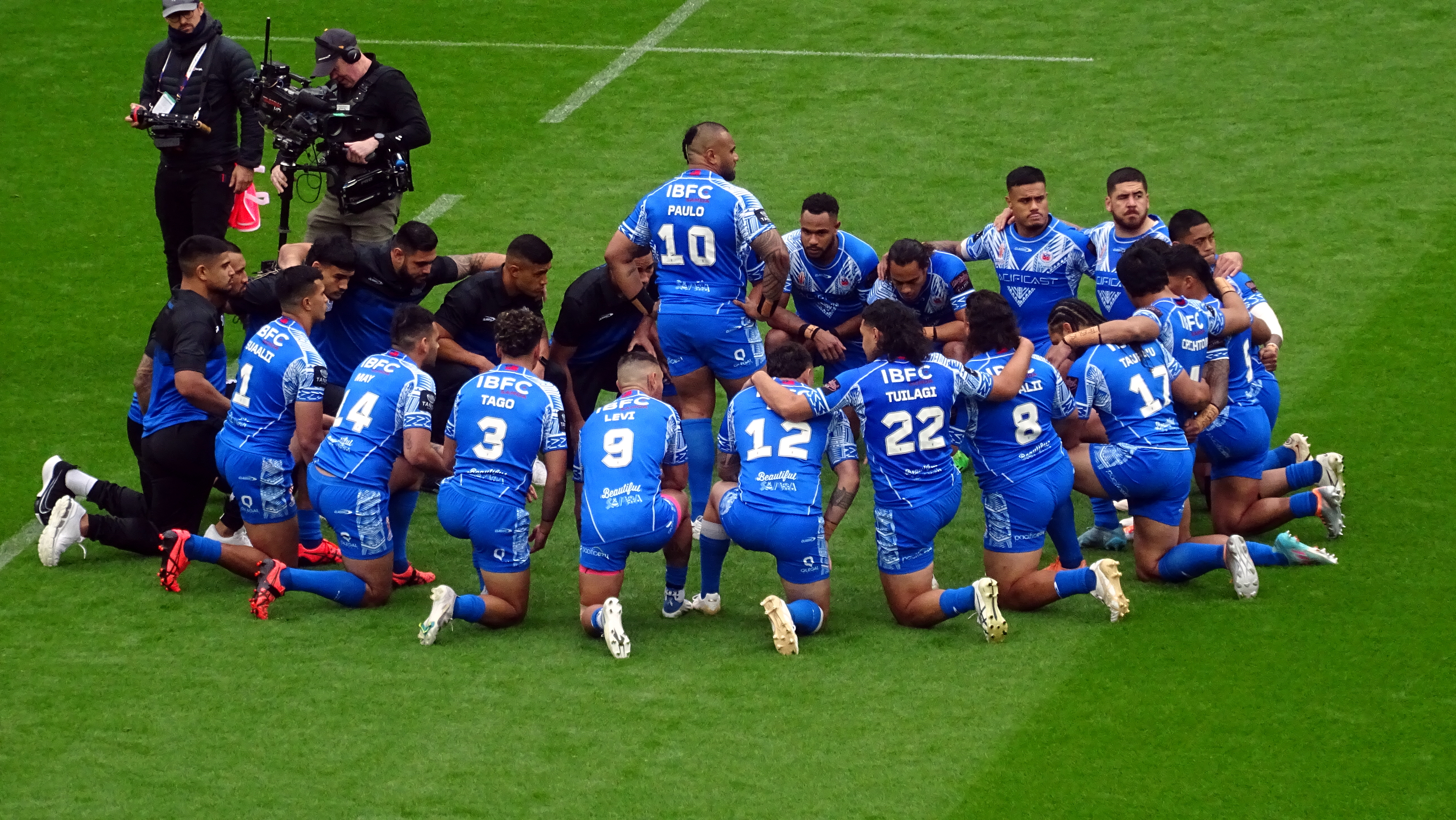
Samoa performing the Siva Tau against England at the 2021 Rugby League World Cup

In October 2022, Samoa opened the 2021 Men's Rugby League World Cup against host nation England. Despite high expectations for Samoa, due to high profile players such as Penrith Panthers premiership winning trio Jarome Luai, Brian To'o, and Stephen Crichton pledging allegiance to Samoa over Australia, Samoa went on to lose the match in embarrassing fashion, 60-6.

Samoa rebounded from the loss in the competition opener with big wins over Greece and France, 72-4 and 62-4 respectively.

Samoa qualified for the finals, coming second place in their pool behind England, and went on to face rivals Mate Ma'a Tonga in the quarter-finals. Samoa would go on to win the match despite a late resurgence from Tonga to win 20-18, qualifying for their first ever world cup semi final.

Samoa would face England in the semi-final, who they lost their first match against. In a back and forth encounter, the scores were tied at 20-20 with less than 8 minutes to go in the match but Stephen Crichton would intercept a pass from Victor Radley running more than 60 metres to score a try to put Samoa ahead. Several minutes later, with just 3 minutes left in the match, England halfback George Williams broke Samoas defence and passed to Herbie Farnworth who would complete a 90 metre long try, taking the score to 26-24. Tommy Makinson would then kick the conversion to tie the match. With the scores tied at 26-26, the match went to Golden Point, with England receiving the ball first. Jack Welsby made an error giving Samoa the ball, which would lead to an Anthony Milford field goal attempt but missed. England received the ball again but a Sam Tomkins error would give the ball back to Samoa once again and Stephen Chrichton kicked the field goal to win the match, 27-26. Sending Samoa to their first ever World Cup final against Australia, and just the fifth team to qualify for the final. (Great Britain, England, France, New Zealand)

== Identity ==
=== Kit ===
Samoa's kit consists of a blue jersey with usually a white V on the chest, paired with blue shorts and socks.

=== Kit suppliers ===
Since 2023, Samoa's kits are currently supplied by Dynasty Sport. Former suppliers were Classic Sportswear (2022), FI-TA (2013-2021), SAS (2006–2013), SportM (1995–2000), Zeus (1992–1995) and Adidas (1990–1992).

=== Sponsors ===
The current sponsors are Pacifcast.

Former sponsors were DB Bitter (1992–1996), Yazaki (Rugby League World Cup 2000), SIFA.WS (2008–2015), Investsamoa.ws, and Vailima.

== Players ==
=== Current squad ===
The Samoa national team for the 2026 Rugby League World Cup.

Jersey numbers in the table reflect team selection for the Semi-Final match against Australia.

Statistics in this table are compiled from the website, Rugby League Project. Tallies in the table include the match versus Australia on 8 November 2026.

J#	Player	Age	Position(s)	Toa Samoa						Club	NRL Matches	Other Reps
J#	Player	Age	Position(s)	Dbt	M	T	G	F	P	Club	NRL Matches	Other Reps
1	Hamiso Tabuai-Fidow	25	Fullback	2022	5	4	0	0	16	Dolphins (NRL)	127	6 13 3 1
2	Brian To'o	28	Wing	2019	16	10	0	0	40	Penrith Panthers	156	17
3	Izack Tago	24	Centre	2022	11	6	0	0	24	Penrith Panthers	114
4	Stephen Crichton	26	Centre	2022	12	7	44	1	117	Canterbury-Bankstown Bulldogs	162
5	Sualauvi Fa'alogo	23	Wing	2023	6	6	0	0	24	Melbourne Storm	46
6	Ronald Volkman	24	Five-eighth	2023	4	2	4	0	16	Parramatta Eels	26
7	Jarome Luai	29	Halfback	2017	21	3	0	0	12	Wests Tigers	172	12 1
8	Francis Molo	32	Prop	2022	10	1	0	0	4	Dolphins (NRL)	175	2 2
14	Jazz Tevaga	31	Hooker, Lock	2017	13	1	0	0	4	Wakefield Trinity	186	3
10	Junior Paulo	32	Prop	2016	25	3	0	0	12	Parramatta Eels	280	11
11	Connelly Lemuelu	28	Second-row	2023	5	0	0	0	0	Dolphins (NRL)	108
12	Jermaine McEwen	21	Second-row	2026	4	1	0	0	4	Newcastle Knights	39
13	Francis Manuleleua	22	Lock	2026	4	1	0	0	4	Newcastle Knights	14
9	Ben Ioelu	22	Hooker	2025	7	2	0	0	8	Sydney Roosters	17
15	Spencer Leniu	26	Prop	2022	11	1	0	0	4	Sydney Roosters	143	6
18	Clayton Faulalo	26	Wing, Centre	—	1	0	0	0	0	Manly Warringah Sea Eagles	25
17	Ata Mariota	24	Prop, Second-row	2025	4	1	0	0	4	Canberra Raiders	90
16	Shawn Blore	26	Second-row	2024	4	4	0	0	16	Melbourne Storm	94
19	Deine Mariner	23	Wing	2024	6	4	0	0	16	Brisbane Broncos	64
20	Pasami Saulo	28	Prop	—	0	0	0	0	0	Newcastle Knights	74	1
21	Enari Tuala	28	Centre, Wing	—	0	0	0	0	0	Canterbury-Bankstown Bulldogs	133	1
–	Eddie Ieremia-Toeava	21	Second-row	—	0	0	0	0	0	New Zealand Warriors	18
IJ	Chanel Harris-Tavita	27	Five-eighth	2019	13	6	2	0	28	New Zealand Warriors	117	1
–	Greg Marzhew	29	Wing	2023	1	0	0	0	0	Newcastle Knights	113

Notes:

- A bold number is the NRL Matches column indicates that the player has made all his NRL appearances for his current club.
- One player, Jazz Tevaga, was selected from a Super League club (Wakefield Trinity). All other players appeared in the 2026 NRL season.
- Five members of the squad have previously played for other international teams:
  - Cook Islands (1): Molo.
  - Australia (1): Tabuai-Fidow. Tabuai-Fidow and Tuala have played for the Prime Minister's XIII.
- Six members of the squad have played State of Origin.
  - NSW (4): Leniu, Luai, Paulo, and To'o.
  - Queensland (2): Molo and Tabuai-Fidow.
- Five squad members have played in All Stars matches.
  - Māori All Stars (4): Harris-Tavita, Luai, Saulo, and Tevaga.
  - Indigenous All Stars (1): Tabuai-Fidow.

=== Notable players and coaches ===
- John Ackland (World Cup 2008 Coach)
- Fa'ausu Afoa circa-1995
- Isaak Ah Mau circa-2006
- Leeson Ah Mau 2013-17
- Roy Asotasi circa-2013
- Monty Betham circa-2000
- George Carmont circa-2008
- Mark Elia circa-1995
- Henry Fa'afili circa-2000
- David Faiumu circa-2010
- Max Fala circa-2000
- Maika Felise (1994, 2000)
- Beau Gallagher circa-2000
- Joe Galuvao circa-2000
- Simon Geros circa-2000
- Harrison Hansen (2007–2013)
- Sam Kasiano (2015–2018)
- Lolani Koko circa-1995
- Vae Kololo circa-2000
- Shane Laloata circa-2000
- Ali Lauiti'iti (2007–2010)
- Brian Laumatia (1992–1995)
- Mark Leafa (2000–2008)
- Brian Leauma circa-2000
- Tuaalagi Lepupa (2008–2009)
- Kylie Leuluai (2006–2009)
- Danny Lima circa-2006
- Jeff Lima (2006–2013)
- Jamahl Lolesi circa-2000
- Graham Lowe (World Cup 1995 coach)
- Des Maea circa-1995
- Hutch Maiava (2006–2008)
- Gus Maietoa-Brown circa-1995
- Vila Matautia circa-1995
- Wayne McDade circa-2008
- Francis Meli (2000, 2008, 2010)
- Laloa Milford circa-2000
- Paul Okesene 1992
- Sam Panapa circa-1995
- Matt Parish (World Cup 2013 coach) & (World Cup 2017 coach) & (World Cup 2021/22 coach)
- Joseph Paulo (2007–2010, 2017)
- Junior Paulo 2016–2025 (World Cup 2021/22 captain)
- Apollo Perelini circa-1995
- Fred Petersen circa-2000
- Robert Piva circa-1995
- Willie Poching (1995, 2000) (World Cup 2000 Captain) (Coach 2009)
- Steve Price Coach 2010–2013
- Frank Pritchard (2014–2017) (World Cup 2017 Captain)
- Frank Puletua (2000, 2008)
- Tony Puletua (2007–2013)
- Ben Roberts (2007–2017)
- Tangi Ropati (2006–2009)
- Tea Ropati circa-1995
- Smith Samau circa-2008
- John Schuster circa-1995 (World Cup 1995 Captain)
- Mike Setefano (1992–1996)
- Lagi Setu circa-2008
- Jerry Seu Seu circa-2000
- Terrence Seu Seu (2008–2009)
- Iosia Soliola circa-2013 (World Cup 2013 Captain)
- David Solomona (2000–2010)
- Malo Solomona (2006–2008)
- Se'e Solomona circa-1995
- Miguel Start circa-2006
- Shannon Stowers circa-2006
- Henry Suluvale circa-1995
- Anthony Swann circa-2000
- Willie Swann (1995–2000)
- Willie Talau circa-2008
- Albert "Alby" Talipeau (2000–2009)
- Tony Tatupu (1992–2000)
- McConkie Tauasa circa-2006
- Misi Taulapapa (2008–2009)
- Ben Te'o circa-2008
- Junior Tia-Kilifi circa-2006
- Va'aiga Tuigamala circa-1995
- Paddy Tuimavave (1986–1992)
- Paki Tuimavave (1992–1995)
- Tony Tuimavave (1990–1995)
- Matthew TuiSamoa 1992–1994
- Tupu Ulufale circa-2008
- Matt Utai circa-2008
- Earl Va'a (1994–1995)
- Chris Vaefaga circa-2006
- Joe Vagana circa-1995
- Nigel Vagana (1995–2008) (World Cup 2008 Captain)
- Gray Viane circa-2006
- Darrell Williams (World Cup 2000 coach)
- Frank Winterstein (2006–2017)

== Records ==
- **Bold**- denotes that the player is still active.

=== Most capped players ===
#	Name	Career	Caps
1	**Junior Paulo**	2016-	22
2	Tim Lafai	2013-2022	18
3	Leeson Ah Mau	2013-2017	16
4	Ben Roberts	2008-2017	15
4	Pita Godinet	2013-2018	15
4	Joey Leilua	2013-2019	15
7	**Jarome Luai**	2017-	14
8	Anthony Milford	2013-2022	13
9	Joseph Paulo	2007-2010, 2017-2018	12
10	George Carmont	2006–2010	11
10	Martin Taupau	2013, 2019-2022	11
10	Josh Papali'i	2017, 2022-2025	11

=== Top try scorers ===
#	Name	Career	Tries
1	Tim Lafai	2013-2022	9
2	George Carmont	2006–2010	7
2	Antonio Winterstein	2013–2016	7
3	Daniel Vidot	2013-2015	6
3	**Taylan May**	2022	6

=== Top points scorers ===
#	Name	Career	Points	Tries	Goals	Field Goals
1	**Stephen Crichton**	2022-	77	4	30	1
2	Tim Lafai	2013-2022	50	9	7	0
3	Anthony Milford	2013-2022	46	4	15	0
4	Ben Roberts	2008-2017	36	5	8	0
5	Joseph Paulo	2007-2010, 2017-2018	34	1	15	0

== Competitive record ==
=== Overall ===
Below is the table of the representative rugby matches played by Samoa at international level. As of 8 November 2026

Opponent	Played	Won	Drawn	Lost	% Won	Year/s
American Samoa	1	1	0	0	100%	1994
Australia	6	0	0	6	0%	2000–2026
Australian Aborigines	3	3	0	0	100%	1990–1994
Cook Islands	8	6	0	2	75%	1986–2022
England	7	1	0	6	14.29%	2006–2024
England Knights	1	0	0	1	0%	2013
Fiji	12	4	0	8	33.33%	1992–2019
France	6	5	0	1	80%	1995–2026
Greece	1	1	0	0	100%	2022
Ireland	2	0	0	2	0%	2000–2008
Lebanon	1	1	0	0	100%	2007
New Caledonia	1	1	0	0	100%	2004
New Zealand	7	0	0	7	0%	2010–2025
Māori	6	2	0	4	33%	1986–2004
Niue	3	3	0	0	100%	1990–2004
Papua New Guinea	4	4	0	0	100%	2009–2026
Rotuma	1	1	0	0	100%	1994
Scotland	2	1	1	0	50%	2000-2017
Tokelau	4	3	0	1	75%	1986–2006
Tonga	23	11	1	11	47.83%	1986–2026
United States	2	1	0	1	100%	2007–2014
Wales	1	0	0	1	0%	1995
Total	101	48	2	51	47.52%	1986–
Note: The list excludes a 2019 match against the Canterbury Bulls.

=== World Cup ===
World Cup record
Year	Round	Position	GP	W	L	D
(France) 1954	did not enter					
(Australia) 1957	did not enter					
(United Kingdom) 1960	did not enter					
(Australia) (New Zealand) 1968	did not enter					
(United Kingdom) 1970	did not enter					
(France) 1972	did not enter					
(Australia) (France) (New Zealand) (United Kingdom) 1975	did not enter					
(Australia) (New Zealand) 1977	did not enter					
1985-88	did not enter					
1989-92	did not enter					
(England) 1995	Group stage	5/10	2	1	1	0
(England) (France) (Ireland) (Scotland) (Wales) 2000	Quarter-finals	8/16	4	2	2	0
(Australia) 2008	Group stage	9/10	2	1	1	0
(England) (Wales) 2013	Quarter-finals	5/14	4	2	2	0
(Australia) (New Zealand) (Papua New Guinea) 2017	Quarter-finals	8/14	4	0	3	1
(England) 2021	Runners Up	2/16	6	4	2	0
(Australia) (Papua New Guinea) (New Zealand) 2026	Semi-finals	4/10	4	2	2	0
Total	0 Titles	7/17	26	12	13	1

=== Four Nations ===
Four Nations record
Year	Round	Position	GP	W	L	D
(England) (France) 2009	Not invited					
(Australia) (New Zealand) 2010	Failed to qualify					
(England) (Wales) 2011	Not invited					
(Australia) (New Zealand) 2014	Fourth place	4/4	3	0	3	0
(England) 2016	Not Invited					
Total	0 Titles	1/5	3	0	3	0

=== Pacific Cup ===
Pacific Cup record
Year	Round	Position	GP	W	L	D
(Cook Islands) 1986	Second Place	2/6	5	3	2	0
(Samoa) 1988	Second Place	2/6	4	3	1	0
(Tonga) 1990	Champions	1/8	5	5	0	0
(New Zealand) 1992	Champions	1/10	6	6	0	0
(Fiji) 1994	Third Place	3/10	6	5	1	0
(New Zealand) 1997	Not invited					
(New Zealand) 2004	Group stage	5/6	2	1	1	0
(New Zealand) 2006	Group stage	6/6	3	0	3	0
(Papua New Guinea) 2009	Quarter-finals	5/5	1	0	1	0
Total	2 Titles	8/12	32	23	9	0

=== Margins and streaks ===
Biggest winning margins

Margin	Score	Opponent	Venue	Date
74	78–4	France	Western Sydney Stadium	16 Oct 2026
68	72–4	Greece	Eco-Power Stadium	23 Oct 2022
58	62–4	France	Halliwell Jones Stadium	30 Oct 2022
58	64–6	Papua New Guinea	PNG Football Stadium	24 Oct 2026
34	38–4	Papua New Guinea	Craven Park	4 Nov 2013
32	42–10	France	CUA Stadium	9 Nov 2008
32	42–10	United States	Halton Stadium	9 Nov 2007

Biggest losing margins

Margin	Score	Opponent	Venue	Date
56	10–66	Australia	Vicarage Road	11 Nov 2000
54	6–60	England	St James Park	15 Oct 2022
50	0–50	New Zealand	Eden Park	21 Oct 2023
46	0–46	Australia	TIO Stadium	17 Nov 2017
44	6–50	New Zealand	Mount Smart Stadium	16 Oct 2010
44	0–44	Cook Islands	Ericsson Stadium	2 Mar 2006

== Attendance records ==
=== Highest all-time attendances ===
Attendance	Opposing team	Venue	Tournament
67,502	Australia	Old Trafford, Manchester	2021 Rugby League World Cup Final
47,813	England	Lang Park, Brisbane	2014 Rugby League Four Nations
44,682	Tonga	Lang Park, Brisbane	2025 Pacific Championships
43,119	England	St James' Park, Newcastle	2021 Rugby League World Cup
41,529	Australia	Sydney Football Stadium, Sydney	2026 Rugby League World Cup Semi Final
40,489	England	Emirates Stadium, London	2021 Rugby League World Cup Semi-Final

=== Highest attendances per opponent ===
Attendance	Opposing team	Venue	Tournament
67,502	Australia	Old Trafford, Manchester	2021 Rugby League World Cup Final
47,813	England	Lang Park, Brisbane	2014 Rugby League Four Nations
44,682	Tonga	Lang Park, Brisbane	2025 Pacific Championships
28,084	New Zealand	Commbank Stadium, Sydney	2025 Pacific Championships
25,257	Fiji	Eden Park, Auckland	2019 Oceania Cup Group B
15,385	Wales	Vetch Field, Swansea	1995 Rugby League World Cup
15,008	Papua New Guinea	PNG Football Stadium, Port Moresby	2026 Rugby League World Cup
13,174	France	Western Sydney Stadium, Parramatta	2026 Rugby League World Cup
10,515	Cook Islands	Campbelltown Stadium, Sydney	2022 Samoa vs Cook Islands
8,602	Ireland	Parramatta Stadium, Sydney	2008 Rugby League World Cup
4,309	Scotland	Barlow Park, Cairns	2017 Rugby League World Cup
4,115	Greece	Doncaster Community Stadium, Doncaster	2021 Rugby League World Cup
4,107	Māori	Derwent Park, Workington	2000 Rugby League World Cup
1,323	Lebanon	Post Office Road, Featherstone	2008 Rugby League World Cup – Pacific Qualifying Final
753	United States	Halton Stadium, Widnes	2008 Rugby League World Cup – Pacific Qualifying

== IRL Rankings ==
IRL Men's World Rankings
Official rankings as of August 2026
Rank	Change	Team	Pts %
1	Steady	Australia	100
2	Steady	New Zealand	82
3	Steady	Tonga	70
4	Steady	Samoa	56
5	Steady	England	54
6	Steady	Papua New Guinea	47
7	Steady	Fiji	34
8	▲1	Cook Islands	24
9	▲2	Netherlands	23
10	▲2	Ukraine	21
11	▼3	France	21
12	▼2	Serbia	20
13	Steady	Wales	18
14	Steady	Ireland	17
15	Steady	Greece	14
16	Steady	Malta	14
17	▲12	Canada	13
18	▼1	Italy	11
19	▼1	Jamaica	9
20	▲7	Scotland	8
21	▲1	United States	8
22	▼3	Poland	7
23	▼3	Lebanon	7
24	▼1	Germany	7
25	▼1	Czech Republic	6
26	▼5	Norway	6
27	▼2	Chile	5
28	▲2	Philippines	5
29	▼1	South Africa	4
30	Steady	Brazil	3
31	Steady	Morocco	3
32	▲1	Argentina	3
33	▲2	Ghana	2
34	▲2	Kenya	2
35	▼1	Montenegro	2
36	▲1	Nigeria	2
37	▼5	North Macedonia	1
38	Steady	Albania	1
39	Steady	Turkey	1
40	Steady	Bulgaria	1
41	Steady	Cameroon	0
42	Steady	Japan	0
43	Steady	Spain	0
44	Steady	Colombia	0
45	Steady	Russia	0
46	Steady	El Salvador	0
47	Steady	Bosnia and Herzegovina	0
48	Steady	Hong Kong	0
49	Steady	Solomon Islands	0
50	Steady	Vanuatu	0
51	Steady	Hungary	0
52	Steady	Latvia	0
53	Steady	Denmark	0
54	Steady	Belgium	0
55	Steady	Estonia	0
56	Steady	Sweden	0
57	Steady	Niue	0
Complete rankings at www.internationalrugbyleague.com

== See also ==
- Rugby league in Samoa
- Samoa national rugby league team results
- Samoa women's national rugby league team
