= Counties Manukau rugby league team =

Rugby team

Counties Manukau
Club information
- Nickname: Stingrays

Current details
- Ground: Leebank Park
- Coach: Rod Ratu

Records
- Premierships: 2015
- Runners-up: 2010, 2012, 2013, 2016
- Minor premierships: 2012, 2013, 2015, 2016

The Counties Manukau rugby league team represents the Counties Manukau zone in the Albert Baskerville Trophy. Previously, teams representing Southern Auckland and the Franklin district of New Zealand have competed in the Lion Red Cup and Bartercard Cup. They are nicknamed the Stingrays.

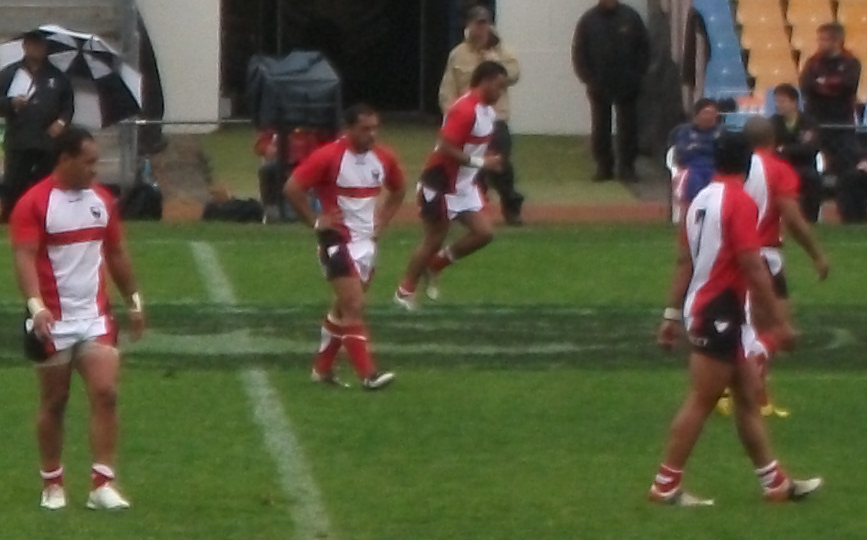
Counties Manukau in 2010

== 1994–1996: Heroes ==
Counties Manukau Heroes
Club information
- Founded: 1994
- Exited: 1996

Former details
- Ground: Greyhound Stadium
- Coach: Stan Martin / Cameron Bell
- Competition: Lion Red Cup

Records
- Premierships: 1996
- Runners-up: 1994
- Minor premierships: 1994

The Counties Manukau Heroes competed in the Lion Red Cup from 1994 to 1996.

Stan Martin coached them in 1994 and 1995 before accepting a contract with the Whitehaven. He was replaced by Cameron Bell for the 1996 season.

=== Notable players ===
Notable players included; Duane Mann, Frank Watene, 1995 captain Dean Clark, Whetu Taewa, Clayton Friend, Des Maea, Gus Malietoa-Brown, Solomon Kiri, Jason Temu, Bryan Laumatia, 1994 captain Hitro Okesene and his brother Paul, Esau Mann, Matthew Sturm, Mark Faumuina, Leroy Joe, Richard O'Connell, Te Manawa Loza, Mark Leithbridge. Jerry Seuseu and Willie Wolfgramm.

=== Season results ===
Season	Pld	W	D	L	PF	PA	PD	Pts	Position	Finals
1994	22	16	2	4	563	332	231	34	Minor Premiers	Lost Grand Final
1995	22	14	1	7	573	413	160	29	Second	Lost preliminary final
1996	22	18	0	4	766	399	367	36	Second	Champions

== 2004–2008: Jetz ==
Counties Manukau Jetz

Club information
- Founded: 2004
- Exited: 2008

Former details
- Grounds: Mt Smart Stadium; Massey Park
- Coach: Gary Kemble / Geoff Morton
- Competition: Bartercard Cup

The Counties Manukau Jetz were a franchise in the Bartercard Cup.

=== Notable players ===
New Zealand Warriors who were assigned to the club included: Sonny Fai, Nathan Fien & George Gatis

=== History ===
The Jetz entered the competition in 2004 in the place of the Manurewa Marlins. They finished a disappointing seventh and missed out on the playoffs. 2005 however was a better year with the team performing well, losing to eventual winners Mt Albert in the Preliminary Final. In 2006 they again made the playoffs but were eliminated by Tamaki in the first week. Before the 2007 season long serving head coach Gary Kemble announced his retirement to concentrate on business interests so former Northern Storm coach Geoff Morton was appointed for the season. The team's final season was its worst with it coming second to last.

Season	Pld	W	D	L	PF	PA	PD	Pts	Position (Teams)	Finals
2004	16	7	1	8	448	441	7	15	Seventh (Twelve)	N/A
2005	16	11	0	5	445	379	66	22	Third (Twelve)	Lost preliminary final
2006	18	9	1	8	522	458	64	19	Fifth (Ten)	Lost Elimination Play-off
2007	18	3	0	15	344	704	−360	6	Ninth (Tenth)	N/A

== 2010: Zone ==
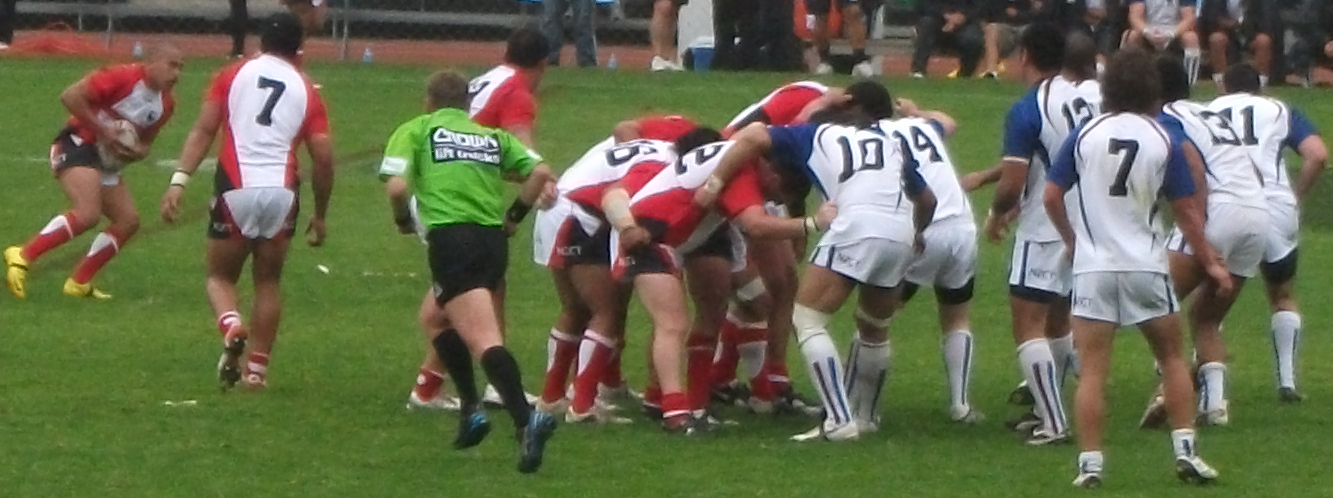
The Counties Manukau side lost 14 – 6 in the Albert Baskerville Trophy final

Following the SPARC review of the New Zealand Rugby League the new zonal competition was launched in 2010. Counties Manukau became a stand-alone zone with a team that was separate from Auckland.

Counties Manukau draws players from Mangere East, Howick, Pakuranga, Papakura, Franklin, Tuakau, Waiuku, Pukekohe, Papatoetoe, Otara, Manukau and Otahuhu.

In the 2010 season, Counties Manukau won the Under 15 and Under 17 tournaments but lost the final of the senior competition, being defeated by Auckland 14 – 6.
