= Fa'ausu Afoa =

Samoa international rugby league footballer

Personal information
- Born: 29 June 1967 (age 58) Western Samoa

Playing information
- Position: Second-row, Prop
Club
Years	Team	Pld	T	G	FG	P
	Northcote Tigers
1993–94	Bradford Northern	1	0	0	0	0
1994	North Harbour Sea Eagles	24	4	0	0	16
1995–97	Penrith Panthers	22	1	0	0	4
	Total	47	5	0	0	20
Representative
Years	Team	Pld	T	G	FG	P
1991–??	Auckland
1992–95	Western Samoa	3	0	0	0	0

Fa'ausu Afoa (born 29 June 1967) is a Samoan former professional rugby league footballer who played in the 1990s for the Penrith Panthers and North Harbour Sea Eagles, and for Western Samoa.

== Background ==
Afoa was born in Apia, Samoa.

== Career ==
Afoa had a brief spell in England with Bradford Northern during the 1993–94 season, but made only one appearance for the club before being released.

He played for the New Zealand XIII side in the 1997 Oceania Cup.
