= Lion Red Cup =

New Zealand rugby league

- Sport: Rugby league
- Inaugural season: 1994
- Ceased: 1996
- Replaced by: Bartercard Cup
- Number of teams: 12
- Country: New Zealand
- Last Premiers: Counties Manukau (1989-2007)
- Most titles: Counties Manukau (2 titles)

The Lion Red Cup was a New Zealand domestic rugby league competition that ran from 1994 to 1996 sponsored by brewers Lion Nathan. It was created due to the increase in public awareness of domestic rugby league due to the Auckland Warriors being accepted into the Winfield Cup. The competition was a huge success in its inaugural year, although it made a massive loss financially. Throughout its three-year history it continued to make a loss, eventually being scrapped by the New Zealand Rugby League.

== Teams ==
The teams that participated were:

Team	Seasons	Played	W	D	L	PF	PA	PD	Premierships	Runner up	Minor Premierships	Wooden Spoon
Auckland City Vulcans	1994	23	14	1	8	539	393	119	0	0	0	0
Auckland Warriors Colts	1995	24	19	0	5	711	398	323	0	1	1	0
Bay of Plenty Stags	1994-6	67	15	4	48	1024	2028	−1061	0	0	0	2
Canterbury Country Cardinals	1994-6	69	32	5	32	1504	1475	197	0	0	0	0
Christchurch City Shiners	1994-6	66	21	1	44	1173	1692	-519	0	0	0	1
Counties Manukau Heroes	1994-6	76	53	3	20	2115	1332	801	1	1	1	0
Hawkes Bay Unicorns	1994-6	66	24	2	40	1217	1545	-328	0	0	0	0
Hutt Valley Firehawks/Dolphins	1994-6	67	33	2	32	1460	1429	52	0	0	0	0
Manawatu Mustangs	1996	22	5	0	17	404	732	-328	0	0	0	0
North Harbour Sea Eagles	1994-6	75	50	1	24	1940	1235	1027	2	0	0	0
Taranaki Rockets	1994-6	66	23	2	41	1336	1744	-453	0	0	0	0
Waikato Cougars	1994-6	73	45	3	25	1696	1412	363	0	0	0	0
Waitakere City Raiders	1994-6	68	39	2	27	1705	1257	404	0	1	1	0
Wellington City Dukes	1994-6	66	27	2	37	1446	1554	-108	0	0	0	0

== Seasons ==
Year	Champions	Score	Score	Defeated	Minor Premiers	Wooden Spoon
1994	North Harbour Sea Eagles	24	16	Counties Manukau Heroes	Counties Manukau Heroes	Bay of Plenty Stags
1995	North Harbour Sea Eagles	28	21	Auckland Warriors Colts	Auckland Warriors Colts	Bay of Plenty Stags
1996	Counties Manukau Heroes	34	22	Waitakere City Raiders	Waitakere City Raiders	Christchurch City Shiners

== Leading Scorers ==
Top Point Scorers

- 500: Paul Howell (Wellington City/Hutt Valley)
- 405: Blair Nickson (Taranaki)
- 395: Earl Va’a (Wellington City/Hutt Valley)
- 304: Ben Lythe (Waitakere City)

Top Try Scorers

- 36: Paul Howell (Wellington City/Hutt Valley)
- 34: Don Stewart (North Harbour)
- 30: Marlon Gardner (Bay of Plenty)
- 39: David Bailey (Waitakere City)

Most Appearances

- 73: Esau Mann (Counties Manukau)
- 72: Matthew Sturm (Counties Manukau)
- 68: Darryn Avery (Canterbury Country)
- 66: Paul Howell (Wellington City/Hutt Valley)
