= 1990 New Zealand rugby league season =

Seasons
- ← 1989 1991 →

The 1990 New Zealand rugby league season was the 83rd season of rugby league that had been played in New Zealand. The main feature of the year was the National Provincial Competition that was won by Auckland.

== International competitions ==
The New Zealand national rugby league team played three matches against Great Britain, two Tests against Papua New Guinea and a Sesquicentennial Test against Australia. They lost the series to Great Britain 2–1 and lost to Australia but won the series in Papua New Guinea 2–0.

Before the Lions arrived a Probables v Possibles trial match was played. The Probables won the match 68–14. The Lions then arrived after five matches in Papua New Guinea and opened the tour with a 23–22 victory over a Presidents XIII. Great Britain then lost to Canterbury 18–10 and Auckland 24–13 before defeating the Kiwi Colts 22–10. Great Britain then defeated New Zealand 11–10 in the first Test before slumping to a 30–22 loss to Wellington. The Lions then defeated the New Zealand Māori side 20–12 and a Taranaki Invitation XIII 24–0 before winning the second Test, and the series, 16–14. The Kiwis came back to win the third Test, defeating Great Britain 21–18 to claim the two World Cup points.

Coached by Bob Bailey and managed by Ray Haffenden, the New Zealand Kiwis squad for the Great Britain series was: Darrell Williams, Sam Panapa, Kevin Iro, Tony Kemp, Tony Iro, Dean Clark, Gary Freeman, Peter Brown, Duane Mann, Brent Todd, Tawera Nikau, Mark Horo, captain Hugh McGahan, Morvin Edwards, Mark Nixon, George Mann, Matthew Ridge and Dean Lonergan.

The Kiwis then travelled to Papua New Guinea for two Test matches. A full seven match tour had initially been scheduled but was cancelled by the NZRL after the International Board ruled that Australian based played only had to be released for the Test matches. Hugh McGahan was excused from the series and Manly initially refused to release Matthew Ridge. Darrell Williams travelled with the squad but returned home after receiving news his father had died. The first Test side was: Morvin Edwards, Sam Panapa, Dave Watson, Paddy Tuimavave, Tony Iro, Tony Kemp, captain Gary Freeman, Peter Brown, Duane Mann, Brent Todd, Tawera Nikau, Mike Kuiti, Mark Horo, Mark Nixon, George Mann and Dean Lonergan. The Kiwis won the first Test 36–4 before winning the second 18–10. Matthew Ridge, Francis Leota and Mike Patton played in the second Test.

The Kiwis then hosted the Australian Kangaroos. The squad was Ridge, Edwards, Watson, Williams, Panapa, Kelly Shelford, Freeman, Brown, Mann, Todd, Longergan, Nikau and captain McGahan. The substitutes, Paddy Tuimavave, Mark Nixon, Mark Horo and George Mann were all unused. The Test was played at Athletic Park and featured the Dallas Cowboys Cheerleaders as the half time entertainment. Australia won the match 24–6 with Sam Panapa scoring New Zealand's only try and Matthew Ridge converting it. Captain Hugh McGahan announced his retirement from international football after the match.

The New Zealand Māori side that played Great Britain was captained by Kelly Shelford and included Morvin Edwards, Sean Hoppe, Dave Watson, John Lomax, Barry Harvey, Jason Lowrie, Tawera Nikau and Mike Kuiti. The side then went to Tonga to compete in the Pacific Cup. The squad included Dean Clark, Sean Hoppe, Jason Mackie and captain Kelly Shelford. New Zealand Māori lost the final 18–26 to Western Samoa.

Eight domestic rugby union players signed for professional rugby league clubs during the year. They were John Gallagher (Leeds), Frano Botica (Wigan), Darrall Shelford and Brett Iti (Bradford Northern), Matthew Ridge (Manly), John Schuster (Newcastle), Daryl Halligan and Paul Simonsson (North Sydney). Ridge, Halligan and Botica went on to play for the Kiwis.

The Junior Kiwis played two matches against a Queensland Juniors side, drawing the series one all. Coached by Ray Haffenden the Junior Kiwis included Solomon Kiri, Shane Endacott, Syd Eru and Stephen Kearney. Zane Clarke, Joe Vagana and Gus Malietoa were included in the New Zealand Schoolboys team.

Tawera Nikau was the New Zealand Rugby League's player of the year. Mark Graham, Kevin Tamati, Ron Ackland, Roger Bailey, Des White and Tommy Baxter were the first six inductees to the New Zealand Rugby League's Hall of Fame. Former Kiwi captain Colin O'Neil was appointed to the New Zealand Rugby League board during the year. The board also voted to support the Auckland Rugby League's bid to enter the Australian Winfield Cup. This finally occurred in 1995 when the Auckland Warriors joined the competition.

== National competitions ==
=== Rugby League Cup ===
Auckland, who had held the Rugby League Cup since 1986, lost the trophy to Canterbury when they lost 25–22 at the Showgrounds on 29 April. Wellington then defeated Canterbury 25–20 in Christchurch to claim the trophy. They defended it once in the remainder of the season, defeating the Bay of Plenty 70–14.

=== National Provincial Competition ===
==== First Division ====
Auckland won the competition, despite losing to Canterbury 25–22 in Christchurch. Auckland won its other five games, defeating Wellington 24–4 and 38–18, Bay of Plenty 62–8 and 64–0 and Canterbury 40–18. Wellington defeated Canterbury 42–2.

- Auckland were coached by Graham Mattson and included Peter Brown, Iva and Peter Ropati, Brian McClennan, Sam Panapa, Phil Bancroft, Tawera Nikau, Paddy and Tony Tuimavave, Se'e Solomona, Francis Leota, Mike Patton, George Mann, Richard Blackmore, Dean Clark and Hitro Okesene.
- The Bay of Plenty included Russell Stewart and Paul Nahu.
- Wellington were coached by Howie Tamati. Their win over Great Britain was the districts first over a touring team. They also drew 18-all with the Queensland Residents side. Wellington included Mike Kuiti, George Lajpold, Barry Harvey, captain Morvin Edwards, Dave Ewe, Sonny Whakarau, Robert Piva, John Lomax, Mark Woods, Esene Faimalo, Peter Edwards, Darren Rameka, Denvour Johnston, Geoffery Tangira, Paul Jones, Rangi Bell and Tom Malu.
- Canterbury were coached by Frank Endacott and included Simon Angell, Riki Cowan, Mike Dorreen, Logan Edwards, Mark Nixon, Brent Stuart, Whetu Taewa, captain Wayne Wallace, Justin Wallace, Andrew Vincent and Aaron Whittaker.

==== Second Division ====
===== Northern Zone =====
- Northland included Jason Mackie.
- Waikato included Tukere Barlow. The Waikato team also toured the South Island during Easter weekend, playing Canterbury and the West Coast.
- For the Taranaki Invitation side that played Great Britain Charlie McAlister returned from England. The side also included Dave Watson, Robert Piva and Barry Harvey.

===== Central Zone =====
- On 25 April, before the Zone competition, Manawatu defeated Taranaki for the first time since 1960. After the competition was over they played Queensland, losing 76–2 despite the Queensland side lacking their NSWRL Premiership players.
- Peter Edwards played for the Wellington Emerging Players.

===== Southern Zone =====
- The Canterbury Emerging Players side who won the title included Andrew Vincent and Blair Harding.
- Wayne Dwyer played for the West Coast.

=== National Club Competition ===
The national club competition, called the Lion Red League Nationals for sponsorship reasons, was won by the Wainuiomata Lions who defeated the Otahuhu Leopards 34–12 to win the National Club Final at Carlaw Park.

Round of 16
Wainuiomata (Wellington)	96
Taradale (H.Bay)	10
Ngongotaha (B.O.P.)	29
Turangawaewae (Waikato)	3
Te Atatu (Auckland)	68
Repongaere (Gisborne-E.C.)	0
Pikiao (B.O.P.)	22
Takahiwai (Northland)	18
Otahuhu (Auckland)	36
Waitara (Taranaki)	7
Kia Ora (Manawatu)	26
Hornby (Canterbury)	20
Upper Hutt (Wellington)	72
He Tauaa (Southland)	3
Addington (Canterbury)	26
Marist (W.Coast)	16

Quarter-finals
Wainuiomata	28
Ngongotaha	20
Te Atatu	48
Pikiao	0
Otahuhu	40
Kia Ora	10
Upper Hutt	20
Addington	6

Semi-finals
Wainuiomata	20
Te Atatu	16
Otahuhu	22
Upper Hutt	18

Grand Final
Wainuiomata	34
Otahuhu	12

== Club competitions ==
=== Auckland ===
Otahuhu won the Fox Memorial trophy, defeating the Te Atatu Roosters 28–14 in the grand final. Northcote were the minor premiers while Richmond won the Roope Rooster. Ponsonby won the Sharman Cup while the Glenfield Greyhounds won the Phelan Shield.

Tawera Nikau won the Rothville Trophy. Ponsonby and City-Pt Chev were promoted to the first Division for 1991, which was expanded from eight teams to ten.

Tawera Nikau, Richard Blackmore, Vaun O'Callaghan, Francis Leota, Mark Faumuina, Dean Clark and Des Maea played for Otahuhu, who were coached by Joe Gwynne. The Northcote Tigers were coached by Graeme Norton and included Brian McClennan, Paddy and Tony Tuimavave, Faausu Afoa and Sean Hoppe while Iva Ropati and Solomon Kiri played for Mangere East. Phil Bancroft played for the Glenora Bears and Sam Panapa, David Bailey and Peter Brown played for the Te Atatu Roosters, who were coached by player-coach Ron O'Regan.

=== Wellington ===
Upper Hutt defeated the Wainuiomata Lions 23–12 to win the Wellington Rugby League's Appleton Shield.

John, Arnold, Tony and David Lomax all played for the Wainuiomata Lions. The side also included Yogi Rogers. Upper Hutt included Sonny Whakarau, Morvin Edwards, Esene Faimalo, Peter Edwards, Syd Eru and Mark Woods. Robert Piva played for Randwick.

=== Canterbury ===
Hornby won a record 18th Canterbury Rugby League title when it defeated Addington 24–14 to lift the Pat Smith Challenge Trophy in the club's 75th year.

Hornby also won the Thacker Shield for Canterbury, defeating Marist.

Simon Angell, Mark Nixon and Blair Harding played for Hornby. Wayne Wallace was Hornby's player-coach. Logan Edwards played for Marist while Mike Dorreen and Brent Stuart played for Addington. Gordon Smith was Halswell's player-coach. Halswell also included Aaron Whittaker.

=== Other Competitions ===
The Takahiwai Warriors, who included Jason Mackie, won the Northland Rugby League title, defeating the Moerewa Tigers 34–20 in the final. The Warriors then defeated the Far North's Te Paatu Warriors in a champion of champions play off.

Turangawaewae defeated Ngaruawahia 13–12 to win the Waikato Rugby League grand final. Tukere Barlow played for the Hamilton City Tigers. The Midland and Bay of Plenty Rugby League's merged before the season began and the clubs competed in a single competition. The Ngongotaha Chiefs, who included Russell Stewart, won the newly combined competition, defeating Pikiao 33–6. The Repongaere Eels defeated the Kaiti Devils 24–4 in the Gisborne-East Coast grand final. The Gisborne-East Coast under 13 representative team included Rico Gear.

The Waitara Bears won the Taranaki Rugby League's Lile Shield, being taken to extra time by the Western Suburbs Tigers before winning 24–16. Kia Ora dominated the Manawatu Rugby League season, winning the grand final 26–0 over Wanganui.

Marist won the West Coast Rugby League title, defeating Suburbs 9–4 in the grand final. Marist were coached by Tony Coll and led by Wayne Dwyer. The West Coast Rugby League also ran a Women's competition for the first time, which was also won by the Marist club.

The University Blue side won the Otago Rugby League title while He Tauaa won its fifth Southland Rugby League title, defeating the Wakatipu Giants 37–12.
