= 1989 New Zealand rugby league season =

Seasons
- ← 1988 1990 →

The 1989 New Zealand rugby league season was the 82nd season of rugby league that had been played in New Zealand. The main feature of the year was the National Provincial Competition that was won by Auckland.

== International competitions ==
The New Zealand national rugby league team lost three tests to Australia, losing 26–6 at Queen Elizabeth II Park, 8–0 at Rotorua International Stadium and 22–14 at Mount Smart Stadium, the third test also doubling as the first game of the 1989-1992 Rugby League World Cup. The Australians had also defeated a Presidents XIII, 50–18, and Wellington, 28–10, but lost to Auckland 24–26. The Kiwis were coached by Tony Gordon and the squad for the series was Darrell Williams, Tony Iro, Kevin Iro, Tony Kemp, Mark Elia, Shane Cooper, Clayton Friend, Brent Todd, Barry Harvey, James Goulding, Hugh McGahan, Sam Stewart, Brendon Tuuta, Gary Freeman, Gary Mercer, Duane Mann, Kelly Shelford, Mark Horo, Phil Bancroft and Kurt Sherlock. Kurt Sherlock became the first New Zealand union-league dual international since Jimmy Haig in 1947.

The Kiwis then embarked on a tour of Great Britain and France. They lost the series with Great Britain 1-2 and defeated France 2–0 in a Test series. In the second Test match at Elland Road Hugh McGahan scored his 16th Test try for New Zealand, a record at the time. The touring party was: Phil Bancroft, Kelly Shelford, Dave Watson, Gary Freeman, Kurt Sherlock, Mark Elia, Kevin Iro, Mike Kuiti, captain Hugh McGahan, Whetu Taewa, Gary Mercer, Francis Leota, Morvin Edwards, Darrell Williams, Tawera Nikau, Wayne Wallace, Sam Stewart, Tony Kemp, Brendon Tuuta, Dean Clark, James Goulding, Esene Faimalo, David Ewe, Adrian Shelford, Brent Todd, Duane Mann, Tea Ropati, Dean Bell, George Mann and Kurt Sorensen. Ewe and George Mann were called in as injury replacements to Goulding and Ropati while due to their contract terms Bell and Sorensen were only available for the Test matches. The tour began with a 26–27 loss to St. Helens and a win against Castleford, 22–20. They then lost to Wigan 14-24 before defeating Bradford Northern, Leeds and Cumbria 26–8, 34-4 and 28-2 respectively. They then won the first Test against Great Britain 24–16. In the second Test they were outplayed and lost 6-26. The Kiwis then defeated Hull F.C. 44–8, Widnes 26-18 and Featherstone Rovers 44–20. Great Britain then wrapped up the Test series by winning the third Test 10–6. New Zealand then headed to France for the final leg of the tour, opening the French leg with a 36–12 win over a Midi Pyrenees regional side. They then defeated France 16–14 in the first Test after France led 14-0 after 30 minutes. The Kiwis then defeated Selection De L'aude 70–0, a then record for a Kiwis side, before beating France B 62–2. New Zealand then won the second Test match 34–0 to finish the tour and claim the two World Cup points. During the French leg of the tour David Ewe was sent home for unbecoming behaviour.

Before the Tests an Auckland v Rest of New Zealand trial was held. The Rest won 38–30. The Rest of New Zealand side was: Morvin Edwards, David Ewe, Paul Nahu, Tea Ropati, Tony Iro, Shane Cooper, Neville Woodham, Russell Tuuta, captain Barry Harvey, George Mann, Se'e Solomona, Esene Faimalo, Brendon Tuuta. Charlie McAlister, Brent Stuart, Gary Mercer and Mike Kuiti.

New Zealand attended the University World Cup. The team finished fourth, losing to France 28–16 in the third place play-off. The side was coached by Ces Mountford and included Paul and Phil Bergman, Andrew Chalmers and Vince Weir.

The Junior Kiwis conducted a six match tour to Papua New Guinea. They defeated the Junior Kumuls 34-8 and 36–10. They were coached by Ray Haffenden and included Hitro Okesene, Sean Hoppe, Jarrod McCracken, Stephen Kearney, Simon Angell, Whetu Taewa, Blair Harding and Tukere Barlow. Jason Temu was named in the under-17 side while the New Zealand under-15 side included Willie Swann.

Darrell Williams was the New Zealand Rugby League's player of the year.

== National competitions ==
=== Rugby League Cup ===
Auckland successfully defended the Rugby League Cup throughout the year.

=== National provincial competition ===
==== First Division ====
- Auckland were coached by Cameron Bell. They also defeated Australia 26-24 and the Eastern Suburbs Roosters 26-12 but lost to a Rest of New Zealand side. 31 players represented Auckland in 1989, including; Phil Bancroft, Kelly Shelford, Sam Panapa, Francis Leota, Tawera Nikau, Tea Ropati, Mark Horo, Paddy Tuimavave, Mike Patton, Peter Ropati, Dean Clark, Kevin Iro, Tony Tuimavave, Dave Watson, Peter Brown, Duane Mann, Ron O'Regan, Vaun O'Callaghan and George Mann.
- The Bay of Plenty struggled in their first season in the first Division as they had lost Mark Woods to Wellington, Justin Wallace to Canterbury and Paul Nahu to the North Sydney Bears. The team included Gary Mercer, Russell Stewart and Glenn Donaldson.
- Wellington were coached by Howie Tamati and included captain Barry Harvey, Mike Kuiti, George Lajpold, Sonny Whakarau, Morvin Edwards, David Ewe, Robert Piva, Daroa Ben Moide, Mark Woods, Charlie McAlister, John Lomax, Emosi Koloto. McAlister, Woods and Koloto all made their debuts for Wellington.
- Canterbury were coached by Frank Endacott for the first time. The side included Simon Angell, Mike Dorreen, Logan Edwards, Terry Hermansson, Mark Nixon, Whetu Taewa, Jason Williams, Justin Wallace and Wayne Wallace. Taewa had transferred from the West Coast in the off-season.

Team	Pld	W	L	PF	PA	Pts
Auckland	6	6	0	282	52	12
Wellington	6	4	2	144	82	8
Canterbury	6	2	4	136	154	4
Bay of Plenty	6	0	6	54	328	0

==== Second Division ====
===== Northern Region =====
- Waikato included Tukere Barlow.

Team	Pld	W	L	PF	PA	Pts
Waikato	3	3	0	134	72	6
Taranaki	3	2	1	63	46	4
Midlands	3	1	2	38	72	2
Northland	3	0	3	50	285	0

===== Central Region =====
Team	Pld	W	L	PF	PA	Pts
Wellington B	3	3	0	124	48	6
Gisborne East Coast	3	2	1	58	54	4
Hawkes Bay	3	1	2	66	95	2
Manawatu	3	0	3	37	88	0

===== Southern Region =====
- The West Coast, in its 75th jubilee year, also defeated Canterbury 20–14 at Wingham Park. They were captained by Brent Stuart and included Bernie Green.

Team	Pld	W	L	PF	PA	Pts
West Coast	3	3	0	160	16	6
Canterbury B	3	2	1	146	130	4
Southland	3	1	2	30	140	2
Otago	3	0	3	40	190	0

=== National club competition ===
The national club competition, called the Lion Red League Nationals for sponsorship reasons, was won by the Northcote Tigers who defeated the Wainuiomata Lions 10–4 in the final.

The Wakatipu Giants (Southland) played Kia Toa (Otago) in a qualifying match with Kia Toa winning through to the main draw.

Round of 16
Northcote (Auckland)	22
Ngongotaha (BOP)
Marist-Western (Canterbury)	22
Cobden-Kohinoor (Wst C.)	8
Mangere East (Auckland)	68
Pacific (Midlands)	14
Addington (Canterbury)	82
Kia Toa (Otago)	2
Wainuiomata (Wellington)	89
Flaxmere (H.Bay)	2
Western Suburbs (Taranaki)	22
Kaiti (Gisborne EC)	16
Upper Hutt (Wellington)	78
Wanganui (Manawatu)	2
Takahiwai (Northland)	30
Turangawaewae (Waikato)	16

Quarter-finals
Northcote	36
Marist-Western Suburbs	2
Mangere East	24
Addington	22
Wainuiomata	82
Western Suburbs	8
Upper Hutt	50
Takahiwai	14

Semi-finals
Northcote	48
Mangere East	24
Wainuiomata	40
Upper Hutt	20

Grand Final
Northcote	10
Wainuiomata	4

== Club competitions ==
=== Auckland ===
The Northcote Tigers won the Fox Memorial, defeating Mangere East 30–14. They were also minor premiers and won the Stormont Shield. The Roope Rooster was won by the Mangere East Hawks. City-Pt Chevalier won the Sharman Cup while Mt Wellington won the Phelan Shield.

Kelly Shelford of Glenora won the Rothville Trophy as player of the year while Jason Lowrie was the most improved forward and Phil Bancroft topped the points scoring charts. Tawera Nikau of Otahuhu won the Best and Fairest award.

Mike McClennan coached the Northcote Tigers and made an immediate impression. The Tigers included Marty Crequer, captain Brian McClennan, Tony and Paddy Tuimavave, Jason Lowrie and Sean Hoppe. Tea Ropati and George Mann played for Mangere East while Duane Mann, Kelly Shelford, Dean Lonergan, Mike Patton and Phil Bancroft played for Glenora. Dave Watson played for Manukau and Mark Bournville played for Mt Albert while Tawera Nikau, Vaun O'Callaghan, Francis Leota and Dean Clark played for Otahuhu, who were coached by Joe Gwynne. Te Atatu included Iva Ropati, Peter Ropati, Sam Panapa, Mark Horo and Peter Brown and were coached by Ron O'Regan.

=== Wellington ===
The Wainuiomata Lions, who only won promotion in 1988, won the Wellington Rugby League championship, defeating Upper Hutt 20–15 in the final.

The Lions included all four Lomax brothers, John, David, Arnold and Tony. Morvin Edwards, Sonny Whakarau, Mark Woods, Mike Kuiti and David Ewe played for Upper Hutt while Barry Harvey, George Lajpold and Denvour Johnston played for Randwick. Yogi Rogers, James Leuluai and Charlie McAlister played for Petone.

=== Canterbury ===
The Addington Magpies won the Pat Smith Challenge Trophy, defeating Marist-Western 27–14. It was Marist-Western's sixth grand final loss since 1969.

Addington then defeated Cobden-Kohinoor 16–10 to retain the Thacker Shield for Canterbury.

Addington included Mike Dorreen while Hornby included Wayne Wallace, who had returned from Marist-Western, and Mark Nixon. Whetu Taewa played for Halswell.

=== Other competitions ===
The Takahiwai Warriors defeated the Moerewa Tigers 26–15 in the Northland Rugby League grand final. The Orowhana Dragons won the Far North title. Jason Mackie played for Takahiwai.

Turangawaewae defeated Ngaruawahia 18–11 to win the Waikato Rugby League grand final. Junior Kiwi Tukere Barlow played for the Hamilton City Tigers. Ngongotaha defeated Pikiao, who included Gary Mercer, 18–14 in the Bay of Plenty Rugby League grand final. Pikiao however won the combined Bay of Plenty-Midlands competition, defeating Putatura 36–34 in that final.

Western Suburbs defeated the Waitara Bears 14–12 in the Taranaki Rugby League grand final to win the Adam Lile Shield. The Kaiti Devils defeated the Repongaere Eels 24–14 to win the Gisborne-East Coast Rugby League grand final. Flaxmere defeated Omahu 34–14 to win the Hawkes Bay Rugby League championship.

Cobden-Kohinoor defeated Waro-rakau in the West Coast Rugby League grand final 36–8. Marist were coached by Tony Coll and included Wayne Dwyer and Brent Stuart. Bernie Green was Runanga's player-coach.
