= 1988 New Zealand rugby league season =

Seasons
- ← 1987 1989 →

The 1988 New Zealand rugby league season was the 81st season of rugby league that had been played in New Zealand. The main feature of the year was the World Cup final that was played at Eden Park. Australia defeated New Zealand in the final 25–12. Auckland won the National Provincial Competition.

== International competitions ==
=== World Cup final ===
New Zealand met Australia in the World Cup final, the culmination of four years of competition. At the end of four years, Australia finished top of the table, and, through their victory over Great Britain in Christchurch, the Kiwis qualified to host the final. The final was played at Eden Park, the first occasion that rugby league had used the ground since 1919. Prior to kick-off Graham Brazier performed the New Zealand national anthem.

New Zealand:
1. Gary Mercer; 2. Tony Iro; 3. Kevin Iro; 4. Dean Bell (c); 5. Mark Elia; 6. Gary Freeman; 7. Clayton Friend
8. Peter Brown; 9. Mike Brady; 10. Adrian Shelford; 11. Mark Graham; 12. Kurt Sorensen; 13. Mark Horo
Replacements: Shane Cooper & Sam Stewart
Coach: Tony Gordon

Australia:
1. Garry Jack; 2. Dale Shearer; 3. Andrew Farrar; 4. Mark McGaw; 5. Michael O'Connor; 6. Wally Lewis (c); 7. Allan Langer
8. Paul Dunn; 9. Ben Elias; 10. Steve Roach; 11. Paul Sironen; 12. Gavin Miller; 13. Wayne Pearce
Replacements: David Gillespie & Terry Lamb
Coach: Don Furner

Sunday, 9 October 1988

(Australia) Australian Kangaroos	25–12	New Zealand national rugby league team
Tries: Allan Langer (2); Gavin Miller; Dale Shearer; Goals: Michael O'Connor (4); Drop goals: Ben Elias		Tries: Tony Iro; Kevin Iro; Goals: Peter Brown (2)

Eden Park, Auckland
Attendance: 47,363
Referee: G. Ainui (Papua New Guinea)

Due to the inexperience of the Australian team, the hosts went into the match as favourites in the eyes of many critics. However, the Wally Lewis-led Kangaroos – boasting the likes of Ben Elias, Allan Langer, Paul Sironen and David Gillespie among their 'inexperienced' – triumphed over the ill-disciplined Kiwis, who at least made sure the victorious Australians were bloodied and bruised for their victory lap. For the Kiwis, the Iro brothers, Dean Bell, Gary Freeman, Clayton Friend, Mark Graham, Adrian Shelford and Kurt Sorensen dished out the punishment.

The New Zealand Rugby League called for an inquiry after the result. It was revealed that Gary Mercer was carrying a rib injury before into match and, in hindsight, should not have played in the final. After the match the NZRL stated that it would use Eden Park again in the future, however it did not hold another Test match until 2010, during the Four Nations. A week before the final a Wellington Invitational side gave Australia a solid warm up match, losing 12–24.

=== Other international competitions ===
Earlier in the season the New Zealand national rugby league team played in several other Test series, included two matches that counted towards the World Cup. In February a Presidents XIII lost 38–6 to the new Brisbane Broncos franchise at Lang Park. The team was captained by Barry Harvey. An Auckland v Rest of New Zealand match was held as a Kiwis trial, with Auckland winning 32–6. An hour later Tony Gordon announced his team for the World Cup clash against Papua New Guinea. The team was: Darrell Williams, Shane Horo, Gary Mercer, captain Dean Bell, Kevin Iro, Shane Cooper, Clayton Friend, Adrian Shelford, Peter Brown, Mike Brady, Mark Graham, Sam Stewart, Mark Horo. Reserves: Esene Faimalo and Gary Freeman. The Kiwis won 66–14 in front of 9,000 fans at Carlaw Park. PNG had earlier beaten Midlands and Waikato 58-0 and 38-12 respectively. After the Test match they defeated Northland 58-14 before heading home via Australia.

The Kiwis victory set up a must win clash with Great Britain the following Sunday, with the winner advancing to the final. The final Test of the 1988 Great Britain Lions tour of Australasia, it was held at Addington Showgrounds and was won 12-10 by the Kiwis, with Gary Freeman scoring both tries. The weekend earlier Great Britain had defeated Wellington 24–18. After the Test match Great Britain ended their 18 match tour of Papua New Guinea, Australia and New Zealand by playing Auckland. Auckland, fielding a relatively inexperienced side, won 30–14.

As part of the Australian Bicentenary, the Kangaroos played a Rest of the World side coached by Graham Lowe. The side included eight players from New Zealand; Gary Mercer, Dean Bell, Kevin Iro, Shane Cooper, Wayne Wallace, Adrian Shelford, Mark Graham who captained the side and Sam Stewart.

The New Zealand Māori side, coached by Richard Bolton, played three games during the season. They defeated Hawkes Bay 82–4, Gisborne East Coast 56-0 and Taranaki 38–8. Mark Horo (twice) and Barry Harvey both captained the side, which also included Gary Mercer, David Ewe, Kelly Shelford, Morvin Edwards, Mark Woods, Tawera Nikau and Dave Watson. They then headed to Western Samoa to compete in the Pacific Cup which they won, defeating Western Samoa 26–12 in the final.

A Queensland side, excluding their NSWRL stars, toured New Zealand in May. The side defeated the West Coast 24-12 and Canterbury 26-22 before losing to Auckland 12–70.

Bob Bailey coached the Junior Kiwis who included Jason Donnelly, Jarrod McCracken, Whetu Taewa, Justin Wallace, Simon Angell, Jason Lowrie, Quentin Pongia and Hitro Okesene. Martin Moana was included in the New Zealand Schoolboy side.

Kevin Iro was the New Zealand Rugby League's player of the year. Hugh McGahan was the co-winner of the Golden Boot alongside Peter Sterling. This was the first time a New Zealander had won the award. During the year Ken Stirling was one of the new directors elected onto the NZRL Board.

== National competitions ==
=== Rugby League Cup ===
Auckland successfully defended the Rugby League Cup throughout the year.

=== National Provincial Competition ===
==== First Division ====
Auckland won the title, defeating Canterbury 30–21 in Christchurch and 20–4 at Carlaw Park and Wellington 22–18. However Wellington defeated Auckland for the first time since 1913, winning 18–10 at the Hutt Recreation Ground. Wellington and Canterbury shared a win and a loss against each other.

- Auckland had a new coach in Cameron Bell. During the year the team included captain Paddy Tuimavave, Sam Panapa, Iva Ropati, Shane Cooper, Peter Brown, Mark Horo, Se'e Solomona, Kevin Iro, Kelly Shelford, Dave Watson, Francis Leota, Shane Horo, Phil Bancroft, Brian McClennan, George Mann, Tony Tuimavave, Mark Bourneville, Mike Patton, Marty Crequer, Duane Mann and Rick Cowan. They also lost to the Canterbury-Bankstown Bulldogs 16–20.
- Wellington were coached by Howie Tamati the side included James Leuluai, Mike Kuiti, George Lajpold, Barry Harvey, Sonny Whakarau, Robert Piva, Morvin Edwards, John Lomax, Daroa Ben Moide and David Ewe. Ewe, Edwards, Ben Moide and Lomax all made their debuts during the season.
- Canterbury were coached by Ray Haffenden, in his sixth and final year. He finished with 20 wins, four draws and 12 losses since he started coaching Canterbury in 1982. Mike Dorreen, Logan Edwards, Esene Faimalo, Mark Nixon, Ross Taylor, Brendon Tuuta and Mike Brady.

Team	Pld	W	L	Pts
Auckland	4	3	1	6
Wellington	4	2	2	4
Canterbury	4	1	3	2

==== Second Division ====
===== Northern Division =====
- Northland lost all five matches they played during the year.
- Waikato were coached by Richard Bolton for the second year. The side included Jason Donnelly.
- The Bay of Plenty won the division and in September the New Zealand Rugby League announced that they would be promoted into the first Division in 1989. The team included Gary Mercer, Russell Stewart, Paul Nahu, Justin Wallace and Mark Woods.

Team	Pld	W	L	PF	PA	Pts
Bay of Plenty	3	3	0	98	35	6
Waikato	3	2	1	52	74	4
Midlands	3	1	2	54	58	2
Northland	3	0	3	35	72	0

===== Central Division =====
- After the season was over Taranaki defeated Northern Division champions, Bay of Plenty, 16–10.

Team	Pld	W	L	PF	PA	Pts
Taranaki	3	3	0	56	15	6
Manawatu	3	2	1	56	21	4
Gisborne East Coast	3	1	2	38	79	2
Hawkes Bay	3	0	3	20	55	0

===== Southern Division =====
- Coached by Tony Coll, the West Coast were captained by Brent Stuart and included Glen Gibb, Wayne Dwyer, Whetu Taewa and Jason Palmada. Taewa made his debut for the West Coast.

Team	Pld	W	L	PF	PA	Pts
West Coast	3	3	0	128	10	6
Canterbury B	3	2	1	94	28	4
Southland	3	1	2	30	126	2
Otago	3	0	3	24	112	0

=== National Club Competition ===
The national club competition, called the Lion Red League Nationals for sponsorship reasons, was won by the Te Atatu Roosters who defeated the Glenora Bears 18–8 in the final. The final was held at Eden Park as the curtain raiser to the World Cup final.

Northland Rugby League's Moerewa was eliminated before playing a match due to not having the required number of junior teams.

Round of 16
Pacific (Midlands)
Moerewa (Northland)	DSQ
Te Atatu (Auckland)	30
Ngaruawahia (Waikato)	1
Petone (Wellington)	32
Cobden-Kohinoor (Wst C.)	26
Halswell (Canterbury)	51
Foxton (Manawatu)	12
Glenora (Auckland)	54
Pikiao (B.O.P.)	6
Upper Hutt (Wellington)	46
Marist-Western (Canterbury)	26
Flaxmere (H.Bay)	31
He Tauaa (Southland)	19
Kaiti (Gisborne-EC)	14
Western Suburbs (Taranaki)	8

Quarter-finals
Pacific	0
Te Atatu	84
Petone	36
Halswell	12
Glenora	36
Upper Hutt	18
Flaxmere	22
Kaiti	10

Semi-finals
Te Atatu	14
Petone	2
Glenora	106
Flaxmere	2

Grand Final
Te Atatu	18
Glenora	8

== Club competitions ==
=== Auckland ===
The Te Atatu Roosters won the Fox Memorial title, defeating minor premiers, the Glenora Bears, 22–16 in the grand final. The Northcote Tigers won the Roope Rooster. Richmond, in their 75th year, won the pre-season competition.

Ron O'Regan was the Te Atatu Roosters player-coach, the grand final winning team was: 1. Carl Magatogia, 2. Iva Ropati, 3. Sam Panapa, 4. Grant Raynor, 5. Mark Elia, 6. Ron O'Regan (player-coach), 7. Carl Taylor, 8. Peter Brown, 9. Peter Ropati, 10. Craig Coyle, 11. Tony Botica, 12. Mark Horo, 13. Terry O'Shea, 14. Mau Tofa, 15. Graham Huggins, 16. Raymond Hall, 17. Duane Gwadenski.

Se'e Solomona played for Richmond, who were coached by Fred Ah Kuoi. Kelly Shelford, Dean Lonergan, Mike Patton and Phil Bancroft played for Glenora while Mount Albert Lions were coached by Mike McClennan and included Gary Prohm, Brian McClennan, Mark Bourneville and Kevin Iro. Shane Cooper and George Mann played for the Mangere East Hawks, Francis Leota played for Otahuhu Leopards and Dave Watson played for Manukau. Paddy Tuimavave played for Northcote.

=== Wellington ===
Minor premiers Petone won the Wellington Rugby League title after defeating Upper Hutt 26–16. St George lost to Wainuiomata in the relegation playoff and were relegated to the second division for 1989.

Morvin Edwards, Mike Kuiti, David Ewe and Sonny Whakarau played for Upper Hutt while James Leuluai, Daroa Ben Moide and Peter Mellars played for Petone. George Lajpold, Robert Piva and Barry Harvey played for Randwick.

=== Canterbury ===
Halswell defeated Marist-Western 24–12 to win the Canterbury Rugby League's Pat Smith Challenge Trophy. Addington were the minor premiers. It was the 75th anniversary year for Canterbury's three oldest clubs; Addington, Sydenham and Linwood.

Halswell defeated Marist 42–6 to retain the Thacker Shield for Canterbury.

Phil Prescott coached Halswell who included Brendon Tuuta and Aaron Whittaker while Marist-Western included Mike Brady, player-coach Gerard Stokes and Logan Edwards. Sydenham included Esene Faimalo.

=== Other Competitions ===
The Moerewa Tigers won the Northland Rugby League title, defeating the West End Jumbos 23–14. The Te Paatu Warriors won the Far North title 36–14 over the Orowhana Dragons.

Ngaruawahia defeated the Hamilton City Tigers 30–12 to win the Waikato Rugby League title. Ngaruwahia included Bill Kells, Jason Donnelly played for Frankton, Tukere Barlow played for the Hamilton City Tigers and Martin Moana played for Huntly United. Pikiao won the Bay of Plenty Rugby League grand final, defeating the Ngongotaha Chiefs 26–18. For the first time the Bay of Plenty and Midland clubs played a combined round. Pacific won the Midlands grand final, defeating Putaruru.

Foxton defeated Kia Ora 29–20 to win the Manawatu Rugby League final while Kaiti and Flaxmere won the Gisborne-East Coast and Hawke's Bay Rugby League titles respectively. Western Suburbs won the Taranaki Rugby League grand final 9–7 over the Waitara Bears.

Marist won the grand final while Cobden-Kohinoor won the main championship. Gordon Smith played for Waro-rakau while Cobden-Kohinoor included Glen Gibb. Marist, coached by Tony Coll, included Brent Stuart and captain Wayne Dwyer. Suburbs included Whetu Taewa while Runanga included Jason Palmada.

He Tauaa dominated the Southland Rugby League competition, winning all three trophies.
