= 1991 New Zealand rugby league season =

Seasons
- ← 1990 1992 →

The 1991 New Zealand rugby league season was the 84th season of rugby league that had been played in New Zealand. The main feature of the year was the National Provincial Competition that was won by Auckland.

== International competitions ==
The New Zealand national rugby league team hosted a tour by the French side before themselves touring Australia. The Kiwis won the French series 2-0 but lost to Australia 1–2.

The French opened the tour by losing to the Kiwi Colts, who were coached by Frank Endacott and included David Bailey, Whetu Taewa, captain Mark Nixon, Aaron Whittaker, Syd Eru, Jason Lowrie, Simon Angell, Des Maea and Tony Tuimavave. They then lost the first Test match, held at Carlaw Park, 60–6, before losing to a Howie Tamati coached Presidents XIII 54–2. The French then defeated the West Coast 14–6, their only victory of the tour, before losing the second Test, at the Addington Showgrounds, 32–10. The second Test counted for the 1992 World Cup and New Zealand claimed the two qualifying points. The French then carried on to Papua New Guinea, playing four matches, before heading home.

New Zealand headed to Australia to play a three match series, without any touring matches. In the first Test, held in Melbourne, New Zealand upset Australia, winning 24–8. However the Australians bounced back in the second Test, winning 44–0, before defeating New Zealand 40–12 in the third Test to win the match, the series and the World Cup points.

The Kiwis were coached by Bob Bailey and managed by Ray Haffenden. The squad for the French Tests included Frano Botica, Sam Panapa, Jarrod McCracken, Dave Watson, Richard Blackmore, Kelly Shelford, Gary Freeman, Peter Brown, Duane Mann, Brent Todd, Dean Lonergan, Emosi Koloto, Tawera Nikau, Clayton Friend, George Mann, Mike Patton and Gary Mercer. Jason Williams, Tony Kemp, Esene Faimalo and Kevin Iro were included for the Australian matches. The ex-rugby union players playing in the Winfield Cup; John Schuster, Matthew Ridge, Daryl Halligan and Kurt Sherlock were unavailable due to a dispute between the clubs and the NZRL.

Before the French touring party arrived in New Zealand a Kiwis trial was held. Emosi Koloto (Widnes), Gary Mercer and Duane Mann (Warrington), Frano Botica and Kevin Iro (Wigan), Tea Ropati and George Mann (St Helens), David Watson (Hull KR), Clayton Friend (Carlisle), Peter Brown (Halifax), Mike Kuiti (Leeds) and Brad Iti and Darrall Shelford (Bradford Northern) all returned from England for the trial. Richard Blackmore was the surprise inclusion. The Probables won 31–8.

The New Zealand Māori side played against Waikato during the year to celebrate the Māori queen's 25th jubilee. The Māori side included Frano Botica, in his first match in the country, Clayton Friend, Jason Lowrie, Sean Hoppe, Solomon Kiri and Kelly Shelford.

The Junior Kiwis defeated BARLA 2–0 in a "Test series", winning the first match 34-16 and the second match 28–0. The Junior Kiwis were coached by Howie Tamati and included Bryan Laumatia, William Poching, Solomon Kiri, Tana Umaga, Brady Malam and captain Stephen Kearney. The under-15 national side included Steve Berryman.

Brent Todd was the New Zealand Rugby League's player of the year. At the New Zealand Rugby League's AGM Bill Sorensen was awarded life membership. Sorensen began his playing career with Ponsonby in 1950 and had also served as a coach and a national selector.

== National competitions ==
=== Rugby League Cup ===
Wellington, who won the Rugby League Cup in 1990, successfully defended the cup twice, defeating the West Coast 44-10 and Bay of Plenty 40-8 before losing the trophy 24–25 to Auckland. Auckland then defeated the Bay of Plenty 58-14 before losing 24–33 to Canterbury, who ended the season holding the trophy.

=== National Provincial Competition ===
==== First Division ====
- Auckland were coached by Owen Wright. The side included Faausu Afoa, David Bailey, Phil Bancroft, Richard Blackmore, Dean Clark, Clayton Friend, Stu Galbraith, Francis Leota, Dean Lonergan, Duane Mann, Tawera Nikau, Sam Panapa, Mike Patton, James Pickering, Paul Okesene, Iva and Peter Ropati, Kelly Shelford, Se'e Solomona, Tony Tatupu, Latham Tawhai, Matthew Tuisamoa and Tony Tuimavave. Bailey made his debut for Auckland.
- The Bay of Plenty were coached by Tony Gordon and captained by Russell Stewart. The side included Gary Mercer and Glenn Donaldson.
- Wellington were coached by new coach Tyrone Paikea and included Mike Kuiti, Barry Harvey, Morvin Edwards, Sonny Whakarau, Robert Piva, John Lomax, Mark Woods, Peter Edwards, Stephen Kearney, Yogi Rogers, Syd Eru, Emosi Koloto and Riki Cowan. Eru, Kearney, Rogers and Cowan all made their debuts for Wellington.
- Canterbury were coached by Frank Endacott and included Simon Angell, Esene Faimalo, Quentin Pongia, Aaron Whittaker, Mike Dorreen, Terry Hermansson, Brent Stuart, Andrew Vincient, captain Logan Edwards, Mark Nixon, Justin Wallace and Whetu Taewa.

| Team | Pld | W | L | PF | PA | Pts |
|---|---|---|---|---|---|---|
| Auckland | 6 | 5 | 1 | 231 | 91 | 10 |
| Canterbury | 6 | 4 | 2 | 177 | 116 | 8 |
| Wellington | 6 | 3 | 3 | 162 | 158 | 6 |
| Bay of Plenty | 6 | 0 | 6 | 72 | 277 | 0 |

==== Second Division ====
In August a Northern Provinces team defeated Southern Provinces 32–10. Northern Provinces included Jason Mackie and Tukere Barlow.

===== North Island =====
- Northland were coached by former Wigan representative Anthony Murray and included Jason Mackie and went through the season undefeated. Mackie was based in Devonport with the Navy and traveled to Whangarei for matches and training.
- Waikato included Tukere Barlow.

| Team | Pld | W | L | PF | PA | Pts |
|---|---|---|---|---|---|---|
| Northland | 5 | 5 | 0 | 168 | 89 | 10 |
| Hawke's Bay | 5 | 4 | 1 | 138 | 68 | 8 |
| Waikato | 5 | 3 | 2 | 102 | 68 | 6 |
| Manawatu | 5 | 1 | 4 | 86 | 155 | 2 |
| Taranaki | 5 | 1 | 4 | 107 | 148 | 2 |
| Gisborne-E.C. | 5 | 1 | 4 | 97 | 138 | 2 |

===== Southern Zone =====
- West Coast included Wayne Dwyer.

=== National Club Competition ===
The national club competition, called the Lion Red League Nationals for sponsorship reasons, was won by the Northcote Tigers for the third time. The Tigers defeated the Randwick Kingfishers 30–12 to win the National Club Final at Carlaw Park.

The Central-Mosgiel Cobras (Southland) defeated the Wakatipu Giants (Otago) 17–16 to qualify for the tournament.

Round of 16
Northcote (Auckland) | 36
Waitara (Taranaki) | 10
Hornby (Canterbury) | 42
Central-Mosgiel (Otago) | 12
Halswell (Canterbury) | 28
Suburbs (W.Coast) | 20
Takahiwai (Northland) | 28
Pikiao (B.O.P.) | 12
Randwick (Wellington)
Flaxmere (H. Bay) | DSQ^{1}
Hamilton City (Waikato) | 20
Kaiti (Gisborne-E.C.) | 10
Wainuiomata (Wellington) | 42
Waiouru (Manawatu) | 4
Otahuhu (Auckland) | 54
Turangi (B.O.P.) | 10

Quarter-finals
Northcote | 30
Hornby | 8
Halswell | 38
Takahiwai | 12
Randwick | 26
Hamilton City | 12
Wainuiomata | 32
Otahuhu | 4

Semi-finals
Northcote | 26
Halswell | 12
Randwick | 30
Wainuiomata | 22

Grand Final
Northcote | 30
Randwick | 12

^{1} Flaxmere were disqualified for not paying the entry fee; Randwick were advanced to the quarter-finals.

== Australian competitions ==
During the pre-season to the Winfield Cup, the Manly-Warringah Sea Eagles and the Balmain Tigers played matches in New Zealand. Manly defeated the Wainuiomata Lions 20–8 at Fraser Park on 27 January in front of 10,000 fans.

On 8 March Balmain drew 16-all with an Auckland Invitational XIII. The Invitational side included four players from outside of Auckland; John Lomax, Brent Stuart, Whetu Taewa and Syd Eru.

In late September the North Sydney Bears and Western Suburbs Magpies competed in a $100,000 Lion Red Showdown at Carlaw Park along with Auckland and Canterbury. In the semi-finals Auckland defeated Canterbury 14-13 while Norths defeated Wests 30–12. Canterbury then drew with Wests 18-all while Auckland bet Norths 8–4 in the final to claim the prize money. Canterbury, who refused to recognise the matches with full representative status, drafted in Paddy Tuimavave to their side.

== Club competitions ==
=== Auckland ===
Minor premiers, the Northcote Tigers, claimed the Fox Memorial with a 23–20 win over the Otahuhu Leopards. The Tigers also won the Stormont Shield, Rukutai Shield and Roope Rooster.

Joe, John, Peter, Tea and Iva Ropati all played one match together for the Mangere East Hawks on 29 June. It was the only time all five brothers played in the same team. Tea, Joe and Peter had returned from England for Tea's wedding. Bryan Laumatia also played for Mangere East.

Dean Clark, Des Maea, Francis Leota, Richard Blackmore and Kelly Shelford played for Otahuhu Leopards, who were coached by Joe Gwynne. Richmond included Mike Setefano and James Pickering while David Bailey played for the Te Atatu Roosters and Se'e Solomona played for Glenora.

The Northcote Tigers were coached by Graeme Norton and included captain Tony Tuimavave, Fa'ausu Afoa, Don Stewart, Logan Campbell, Sean Hoppe, Ken McIntosh, Stu Galbraith, Jason Lowrie, Jason Palmada and Latham Tawhai.

=== Wellington ===
The Wainuiomata Lions finished minor premiers and met Randwick in the Wellington Rugby League's Grand Final. Wainuiomata prevailed 14–6 to win the Appleton Shield.

The Wainuiomata Lions included John Lomax, Emosi Koloto, Tana Umaga and Yogi Rogers while the Randwick Kingfishers included George Lajpold, Stephen Kearney, Robert Piva, Barry Harvey and Denvour Johnston. Morvin Edwards and Syd Eru played for Upper Hutt.

=== Canterbury ===
Hornby defeated Halswell 18–8 in the Canterbury Rugby League grand final.

Hornby defeated Suburbs 62–10 to retain the Thacker Shield for Canterbury. The score was the highest winning margin and a record total in Thacker Shield clashes.

Hornby were coached by Wayne Wallace, managed by Ross Taylor and included Simon Angell, Blair Harding and Mark Nixon.

Halswell included player-coach Gordon Smith, Whetu Taewa and Aaron Whittaker while Brent Stuart played for Addington and Logan Edwards represented Marist-Western.

=== Other competitions ===
The Takahiwai Warriors, who included Jason Mackie, again won the Northland Rugby League title, defeating the Portland Panthers 16–8 in the final. The Pawarenga Broncos were awarded the Far North title after the Ngati Kahu Sharks forfeited the final due to player illness while the Tautoro Commodores defeated the Hokianga Pioneers 32–22 in extra time to win the Bay of Islands title in front of 2,000 fans.

Hamilton City, who included Tukere Barlow, dominated the Waikato Rugby League and won the grand final 13–0 over Ngaruawahia. Martin Moana played for Huntly South. The Turangi Dambusters defeated Pikiao 30–4 in the Bay of Plenty Rugby League final. Russell Stewart played for the Ngongotaha Chiefs.

The Kaiti Devils won the Gisborne-East Coast Rugby League competition with a 28–18 win over Wairoa while the Flaxmere Falcons won the Hawke's Bay Rugby League title 12–10 over the Tamatea Eagles. The Waitara Bears defeated the Western Suburbs Tigers 12–8 to win the Taranaki Rugby League title. Waiouru defeated Linton 18–17 in the Manawatu Rugby League grand final.

Nelson, who were coached by former Kiwi Kevin Dixon, played a three match series against Marlborough, winning the first 30-20 before losing the second 24-32 and drawing the third match 26-all.

Suburbs won the West Coast Rugby League title in its 26th year. Marist included Wayne Dwyer.

The Central-Mosgiel Cobras won the Otago Premiership while He Tauaa defeated the Wakatipu Giants 24–12 in the Southland final.
