= 1987 New Zealand rugby league season =

Seasons
- 1986 1988

The 1987 New Zealand rugby league season was the 80th season of rugby league that had been played in New Zealand. The main feature of the year was the Interdistricts Series competition that was run by the New Zealand Rugby League. Auckland won the series, defeating the other three inter-district teams.

== International competitions ==
The New Zealand national rugby league team began the season poorly when a domestic based side lost to the touring Queensland side 18–14 in May. Queensland then finished their tour undefeated by thrashing Bay of Plenty 72–6.

The Kiwis then toured Papua New Guinea and Australia later in the year. Coached by Tony Gordon the side was George Lajpold, Joe Ropati, Kevin Iro, Mark Elia, Dean Bell, Shane Horo, Gary Mercer, Sam Panapa, Gary Freeman, Peter Brown, Ross Taylor, Adrian Shelford, Barry Harvey, Wayne Wallace, Dean Lonergan, Mark Horo, Sam Stewart and captain Ron O'Regan. However O'Regan had to withdraw due to injury before the touring party left New Zealand. Dean Bell replaced him as captain while Shane Cooper was called into the squad. The team defeated Northern Rivers 44-12 and Queensland 22-16 before there two test matches. Before the Queensland game the squad was joined by four Australian based professionals; Hugh McGahan, Brent Todd, Clayton Friend and Darrell Williams. As a result, four players were sent home after the Queensland game; Peter Brown and George Lajpold due to injury and Sam Panapa and Joe Ropati due to form. The Kiwis then travelled for Port Moresby and defeated Papua New Guinea 36-22 before returning to Brisbane and upsetting the Australian Kangaroos 13–6. The Kiwis had originally planned to host France in 1987 but the French withdrew from their planned tour of Papua New Guinea, Australia and New Zealand due to financial reasons.

The New Zealand XIII that played against Queensland was George Lajpold, Warren Mann, Kevin Iro, Tea Ropati, Gary Mercer, Sam Panapa, Gary Freeman, Adrian Shelford, Barry Harvey, Peter Brown, captain Sam Stewart, Peter Ropati and Mark Horo. Bench: Paddy Tuimavave and Wayne Wallace. Kiwis coach Tony Gordon coached the side. New South Wales Country conducted a two match tour of New Zealand before their annual City vs Country Origin match. They defeated Waikato 18-0 before losing to Auckland 6-44.

The Junior Kiwis made their first ever tour of Great Britain. The side was coached by Bob Bailey and the following players were selected for the tour: Carl Findlay, Stuart Simcott, Jason Lowrie, Terry Cuthbert, Jason Palmada, Tame Tagaloa, Tony Tuimavave, Michael Culley, Mike Setefano, Pecham Murray, Mike Brown, Walter Wilson, David Marsh, Jarrod McCracken, Kevin Iro, David Bailey, Thom Perenara, Dean Clark, Mark Nixon, Todd Price, Justin Wallace, Carl Hall and Tony Kemp. The Junior Kiwis won all seven games on tour, including two "Tests" against British Amateur Rugby League Association.

The under 17-year old national side included Ken McIntosh, Hitro Okesene, Blair Harding and Tukere Barlow. Maea David, Mark Bourneville (as captain) and Stephen Kearney was included in the under 15-year old side.

Auckland also toured Great Britain. They were coached by Bob Bailey, who had already announced his retirement from the position at the end of the year. The side defeated Leeds, 29–25, and Warrington, 22–16, before losing to St. Helens 52–26. They then lost to Hull F.C. 26-24 before defeating the champion Wigan club 10–6 in front of 10,743 fans at Central Park. They then lost to a Chairman's XIII 12–6 to finish the tour. The squad was: John Ropati, Warren Mann, Shane Cooper, Marty Crequer, Shane Horo, Gary Freeman, Kevin Iro, Paddy Tuimavave, Sam Panapa, Michael Patton, Tea Ropati, Clayton Friend, Peter Brown, Steve Kaiser, Mark Horo, captain Ron O'Regan, Rene Nordmeyer, George Mann, Lindsay Hooker, James Goulding, Dean Lonergan, Peter Ropati and referee Bill Shrimpton.

Dean Bell was the New Zealand Rugby League's player of the year.

== National competitions ==
=== Rugby League Cup ===
Auckland successfully defended the Rugby League Cup three times at Carlaw Park over the year. They defeated the Bay of Plenty 40–8, Wellington 40-0 and Waikato 82–4.

=== Interdistricts Series ===
Auckland defeated the South Island 26–24 at Wingham Park.

- Auckland set a world rugby league record when four brothers played for the side. Tea, John, Peter and Joe Ropati all played for Auckland against Northern Districts. Ron O'Regan became the first player to play 50 games for the district. The team was coached by Bob Bailey and also included Paddy Tuimavave, Peter Brown, Shane Horo, Gary Freeman, Kevin Iro, Dean Lonergan, Sam Panapa, Shane and Mark Horo, Marty Crequer, George Mann and Mark Elia.
- Northern Districts included Gary Mercer, Russell Stewart, Mark Woods and Tawera Nikau.
- Central Districts included George Lajpold, James Leuluai, Adrian Shelford, Barry Harvey, Sam Stewart and Mike Kuiti.
- The South Island were coached by Ray Haffenden and included Brendon Tuuta, Phil Bancroft, Ross Taylor, Wayne Wallace and Esene Faimalo. Dean Bell played one match as a guest player.

==== Seasons Standings ====
| Team | Pld | W | L | PF | PA | Pts |
|---|---|---|---|---|---|---|
| Auckland | 3 | 3 | 0 | 146 | 44 | 6 |
| Central Districts | 3 | 2 | 1 | 86 | 94 | 4 |
| Northern Districts | 3 | 1 | 2 | 43 | 122 | 2 |
| South Island | 3 | 0 | 3 | 62 | 77 | 0 |

=== National Provincial Competition ===
Wellington won the inter-zone final, defeating Bay of Plenty in the final. They then lost to Auckland in the National Provincial final.

==== North Island First Division ====
- Northland lost all five matches and ended the season being demoted to the second division.
- Waikato were coached by Richard Bolton and included Tawera Nikau, who had made his debut in 1986.
- Bay of Plenty included Mark Woods, Gary Mercer and Russell Stewart.

==== Southern Zone First Division ====
- Wellington were coached by Howie Tamati for the second year. The team included Adrian Shelford, Sam Stewart, George Lajpold, Sonny Whakarau, James Leuluai, Robert Piva, Tony Kemp, Mike Kuiti and Barry Harvey. Harvey and Leuluai both made their debuts for Wellington during the year.
- Canterbury were coached by Ray Haffenden. Canterbury conducted a three match North Island tour during the year, playing Bay of Plenty, Waikato and Wellington. They also hosted Auckland during its 75th Jubilee celebrations, losing 20–38. The Canterbury team included Esene Faimalo, Ross Taylor, Wayne Wallace, Brendon Tuuta and Phil Bancroft.
- The West Coast were coached by Tony Coll.

==== North Island Second Division ====
The Wellington Emerging players side won the second Division title for the third successive year. Midlands defeated Northland at the end of the season to earn promotion into the first Division.

==== South Island Second Division ====
West Coast B won the second Division, ending Canterbury B's nine-year domination of the division. They defeated Canterbury B, Otago and Southland on the way to the title. Glen Gibb and Bernie Green both played for West Coast B.

=== National Club Competition ===
The national club competition, called the Lion Red League Nationals for sponsorship reasons, was won by the Northcote Tigers who defeated the Mangere East Hawks 14–12 in the final. The final was held at Carlaw Park.

In a qualifying match, He Tauaa (Southland) defeated St Kilda (Otago) 33–14.

Round of 16
Mangere East (Auckland) | 80
Kaiti (Gisborne EC) | 12
He Tauaa (Southland) | 40
Runanga (West Coast) | 10
Randwick (Wellington) | 52
Halswell (Canterbury) | 12
Frankton (Waikato) | 36
Turangi (Midlands) | 10
Northcote (Auckland) | 54
Ngongotaha (B.O.P.) | 0
Upper Hutt (Wellington) | 58
Marton (Manawatu) | 8
Hornby (Canterbury) | 36
Omahu (H.Bay) | 5
Waitara (Taranaki) | 24
Portland (Northland) | 20

Quarter-finals
Mangere East | 42
He Tauaa | 6
Randwick | 62
Frankton | 14
Northcote | 34
Upper Hutt | 8
Hornby | 46
Waitara | 10

Semi-finals
Mangere East | 48
Randwick | 12
Northcote | 30
Hornby | 4

Grand Final
Mangere East | 12
Northcote | 14

== Club competitions ==
=== Auckland ===
The Northcote Tigers won their first ever Fox Memorial when they defeated minor premiers, the Mangere East Hawks, 12–8 in front of 14,000 fans at Carlaw Park. It was the first time a North Shore club had won the Fox since 1941. The Te Atatu Roosters won the pre-season tournament, defeating the Mount Albert Lions 24–20. The Otahuhu Leopards won the knock out Roope Rooster, defeating the Glenora Bears 24–8 in the final.

Jason Lowrie, Marty Crequer, Gary Freeman and Shane Horo and Todd Price Junior Kiwi played for Northcote. Tom Conroy served as the Tigers trainer. Paddy Tuimavave, Tony Tuimavave and Kevin Iro played for Mount Albert while Mike Steafano played for the Marist Saints and Fred Ah Kuoi and James Goulding played for the Richmond Bulldogs.

Jarrod McCracken, Dean Lonergan, Michael Patton and David Bailey played for Glenora Bears. At the end of the season the Glenora Bears played the North Sydney Bears in front of 12,000 fans at Carlaw Park, losing 8–11. Dean Clark, Francis Leota and Tea, Peter and Iva Ropati played for Otahuhu Leopards while Ron O'Regan, Peter Brown, Mark Horo and Sam Panapa played for Te Atatu Roosters. Shane Cooper, who had joined from Mount Albert after 21 years with the Lions, and George Mann played for Mangere East Hawks. David Watson played for the Manukau Magpies.

=== Wellington ===
The Upper Hutt Tigers won their second grand final in a row, defeating the Randwick Kingfishers 20–12. Tony Kemp, Barry Harvey, Sam Stewart and George Lajpold played for Randwick while Sonny Whakarau, Mike Kuiti and Adrian Shelford played for Upper Hutt. Robert Piva played for St. George while James Leuluai joined the Petone club mid-season.

=== Canterbury ===
Minor premiers Halswell defeated Hornby 15–14 in the Canterbury Rugby League grand final. Hornby won the pre-season tournament.

Halswell defeated Cobden-Kohinoor to retain the Thacker Shield.

Brendon Tuuta, who had signed from Hornby, and Phil Bancroft played for Halswell, who were coached by Phil Prescott in his debut year. Ross Taylor, Barry Edkins and Mark Nixon played for Hornby, who were coached by Frank Endacott. Logan Edwards played for Marist-Western while Mark Broadhurst played for Papanui.

=== Other Competitions ===
The Portland Panthers dominated the Northland Rugby League competition, winning 21 matches in a row.

The Frankton Albions won the Waikato Rugby League title, defeating Huntly South in the final. Vaun O'Callaghan played for Huntly South while Frankton included Jason Donnelly. Turangi won the Midlands grand final 5-4 while Kaiti dominated in the Gisborne-East Coast competition.

In the Bay of Plenty Rugby League grand final the two form teams of the competition met, Ngongotaha and Pikiao. Ngongotaha, who included Mark Woods won 8–7. The Waitara Bears won the Taranaki Rugby League grand final, defeating Western Suburbs 26–12. The Omahu Huias defeated the Hastings City Tigers in the Hawke's Bay Rugby League grand final.

Runanga won its ninth consecutive West Coast Rugby League title, defeating Marist 12–8. Wayne Dwyer played for Marist while Jason Palmada, Glen Gibb and Bernie Green played for Runanga.

He Tauaa won the Southland Rugby League competition.
