= 1997 New Zealand rugby league season =

Seasons
- 1996 1998

The New Zealand rugby league season 1997 was the 90th season of rugby league that had been played in New Zealand. The main feature of the year was the Super League Challenge Cup that was run by the New Zealand Rugby League. Waikato won the Challenge Cup by defeating Canterbury 34-18 and also ended the season holding the Rugby League Cup.

== International competitions ==
A New Zealand side selected from Australasian-based New Zealanders lost to a Queensland side 26–12 at Ericsson Stadium in May as part of the Super League Tri-series. The team also lost to New South Wales and failed to make the final. The side was coached by Graeme Norton and he served as a selector alongside Frank Endacott and Gary Kemble. The squad for the two matches was Anthony Swann, Sean Hoppe, Tea Ropati, Ruben Wiki, Richie Barnett, Gene Ngamu, Stacey Jones, Quentin Pongia, Syd Eru, Joe Vagana, Tony Iro, captain Stephen Kearney, Tawera Nikau, John Timu, Brady Malam, Tyran Smith and Marc Ellis.

After losing to Australia in the inaugural Anzac Test in 34-22 Sydney on 25 April, the New Zealand national rugby league team hosted Australia in September at North Harbour Stadium. They were able to defeat them 30–12, the first time they had beaten Australia since 1991. Frank Endacott coached the Kiwis. The squad for the 1997 Anzac Test was Richie Barnett, Sean Hoppe, Ruben Wiki, John Timu, Daryl Halligan, Gene Ngamu, Stacey Jones, Grant Young, Syd Eru, Quentin Pongia, Tony Iro, captain Stephen Kearney, Tawera Nikau. Bench: Tea Ropati, Tyran Smith, Robbie Paul and Joe Vagana. For the second Test match Matthew Ridge returned as captain and Richard Blackmore, Kevin Iro, John Lomax and Logan Swann all played. 17,456 fans turned out to North Harbour Stadium for the match.

In the Oceania Cup, the New Zealand XIII and the New Zealand Māori met in the final at Carlaw Park, with New Zealand XIII winning 20 – 15. New Zealand Māori were coached by Cameron Bell and included Dean Clark, Tukere Barlow, Frank Watene, Darryl Beazley and Solomon Kiri. New Zealand XIII were coached by Gary Kemble and included Glenn Coughlan, Blair Harding, Mike Dorreen, Iva Ropati, Shane Endacott, captain Aaron Whittaker, Mark Faumuina, Denvour Johnston, Hitro Okesene, Jerry Seuseu, Bryan Henare, Meti Noovao, Brad Williams, Joe Galuvao, Fa'ausu Afoa, Ben Fahey, Jason Kerapa, Keneti Asiata and Paul Staladi. Richard Stewart replaced Shane Endacott when he withdrew due to injury. Before the series began the New Zealand Māori bet the New Zealand XIII 21–19 at Ericsson Stadium.

Graham Norton again was the selector-coach for the New Zealand World Nines team. The squad was Stacey Jones, Marc Ellis, captain Stephen Kearney, Joe Vagana, Shane Endacott, Richie Barnett, Ruben Wiki, Quentin Pongia, Robbie Paul, Tony Tatupu, Tony Iro, Tyran Smith, John Timu and Jason Williams. Henry Paul, Matthew Ridge, Sean Hoppe, Grant Young and Gene Ngamu all withdrew due to injuries. New Zealand made the final and then defeated Western Samoa 16–0 to win the tournament.

The Junior Kiwis were coached by Lex Clarke and included Brian Leauma, Frank Puletua, David Solomona, Tony Puletua, Kyle Leuluai, captain Monty Betham, Odell Manuel, Ali Lauitiiti, Peter Lewis, Fred Petersen, Joe Galuvao and Lesley Vainikolo. The team won the first match 17-16 before losing 14–18 in the second to draw the series.

A New Zealand Academy side, which included Leslie Vainikolo, Wairangi Koopu, Mark Leafa, Filimone Lolohea and Ali Lauitiiti, lost to Australia under-17's 42–26 in the curtain raiser to the Super League Tri-series final.

The Kiwi Ferns defeated Australia 2–0 in an unofficial Test series. The first match was won 34–26 in Wellington while the second was hosted at Carlaw Park in Auckland. The Kiwi Ferns won 40–16. The Australian Women's side won tour matches against Gisborne East Coast and Hawkes Bay.

Stephen Kearney won the New Zealand Rugby League's player of the year award.

== National competitions ==
=== Rugby League Cup ===
Canterbury won the Rugby League Cup from Auckland 32–26 in June and then defended it against West Coast (twice), Tasman, Southland and Taranaki before losing it to Waikato 34–18 in the Challenge Cup final.

=== Super League Challenge Cup ===
The Sky Challenge Cup replaced the Lion Red Cup as the main domestic competition. It was cost conscious after the expensive Lion Red Cup and focused on regional pools to save on travel costs.

The Competition started in August and finished on the 12 October with a grand final. Sixteen teams were grouped into four regions. Each regional pool consisted of a round robin followed by a regional three-match play off series to determine quarter final rankings, the competition then moved into a knock out phases including two teams from each region.

==== Northern Region ====
The Northern Zone included two Auckland sides; the Auckland Heroes, who were coached by Brian McClennan and included captain Duane Mann, Tama Hohaia, Phillip Leuluai, Dean Clark, Ben Lythe, Anthony Seuseu, Don Stewart, Hare Te Rangi, Willie Wolfgramme, Paki Tuimavave, Charlie Kennedy, Darryl Beazley, Boycie Nelson and Lesley Vainikolo, and the Auckland Raiders, who represented Auckland Rugby League's second division and were coached by Dominic Clark. The Raiders included Tyrone Pau. Other teams included the Waikato Cougars, who were coached by Bill Kells and featured Tukere Barlow, Darryl Fisher and Kelly Shelford, and the Northland Wild Boars, who were coached by Phil Marsh and included Jason Mackie.

The Auckland Heroes were unbeaten in their six-round robin games while the Auckland Raiders won just once in the round robin. Waikato won three of their six matches.

On the 14 September Waikato defeated the Auckland Heroes at Carlaw Park for the first time since 1943, while Northland eliminated the Raiders from the competition. Northland were subsequently eliminated by the Auckland Heroes.

Northern Region
Team	Pld	W	D	L	PF	PA	PD	Pts
Auckland Heroes	6	6	0	0	251	98	153	12
Waikato Cougars	6	3	0	3	132	150	-18	6
Northland Wild Boars	6	2	0	4	130	177	-47	4
Auckland Raiders	6	1	0	5	104	192	-88	2

Ranking Playoffs
Auckland Heroes
Waikato Cougars
Northland Wild Boars
Auckland Raiders

Ranking Playoff
Auckland Heroes
Northland Wild Boars

==== Eastern Region ====
The Eastern Region featured the Bay of Plenty Stags, Hawkes Bay Unicorns, Coastline and the Gisborne-East Coast Lions. Bay of Plenty included Patrick Kuru and Mark Woods. Coastline included Andrew Leota.

Eastern Region
Team	Pld	W	D	L	PF	PA	PD	Pts
Bay of Plenty Stags	6	6	0	0	290	66	224	12
Hawkes Bay Unicorns	6	3	0	3	189	201	-12	6
Coastline	6	2	0	4	210	224	-14	4
Gisborne-East Coast	6	1	0	5	111	309	-198	2

Ranking Playoffs
Bay of Plenty Stags
Hawkes Bay Unicorns
Coastline
Gisborne-EC

Ranking Playoff
Hawkes Bay Unicorns

==== Central Region ====
The Central Zone featured the Wellington Dukes, Wellington Pumas, Taranaki Rockets, coached by Howie Tamati and including Artie Shead, and the Manawatu Mustangs. Wellington Rugby League approached the Auckland Warriors about releasing Syd Eru and Stephen Kearney for the competition, but they were unsuccessful. The Wellington Dukes included Denvour Johnston. The Wellington Pumas were a second XIII from the region.

The Dukes won the zone with the Rockets finishing second. Manawatu did not win a game.

The Rockets them eliminated the Pumas in a close zonal play-off match.

Central Region
Team	Pld	W	D	L	PF	PA	PD	Pts
Wellington Dukes	6	5	1	0	221	138	83	11
Taranaki Rockets	6	4	0	2	175	154	21	8
Wellington Pumas	6	2	1	3	173	150	23	5
Manawatu Mustangs	6	0	0	6	106	233	-127	0

Ranking Playoffs
Wellington Dukes
Taranaki Rockets
Wellington Pumas
Manawatu Mustangs

Ranking Playoff
Taranaki Rockets
Wellington Pumas

==== Southern Region ====
The Southern Zone featured the West Coast Chargers, Canterbury Reds, who included Simon Angell, Blair Harding, Mark Nixon and were coached by Gerard Stokes, the Tasman Orcas and the Southland Rams.

Southland had defeated Otago 34–20 to qualify for the round robin.

Canterbury hosted the West Coast at Lancaster Park, the first time they had played there since 1920.

Canterbury were undefeated in the round robin while Tasman failed to win a match.

Canterbury defeated West Coast in a close South zone final, 28–21, on the 14 September.

Southern Region
Team	Pld	W	D	L	PF	PA	PD	Pts
Canterbury Reds	6	6	0	0	300	64	236	12
West Coast Chargers	6	4	0	2	260	132	128	8
Southland Rams	6	2	0	4	170	244	-74	4
Tasman Orcas	6	0	0	6	100	390	-290	0

Ranking Playoffs
Canterbury Reds
West Coast Chargers
Southland Rams
Tasman Orcas

Ranking Playoff
West Coast Chargers
Southland Rams

==== Finals ====
Quarterfinals
N1	Waikato Cougars	18
E2	Hawkes Bay Unicorns	10
E1	Bay of Plenty Stags	18
N2	Auckland Heroes	20
C1	Wellington Dukes	22
S2	West Coast Chargers	34
S1	Canterbury Reds	42
C2	Taranaki Rockets	18

Semifinals
Waikato Cougars	24
Auckland Heroes	18
West Coast Chargers	24
Canterbury Reds	40

Finals
Waikato Cougars	34
Canterbury Reds	18

In the first round of finals on 28 September Canterbury defeated Taranaki while West Coast also advanced to the semi-finals with a shock 34–22 win over the Wellington Dukes.

In the semi-finals on the 5 October Canterbury defeated the West Coast 24–30. In the other semi final Waikato defeated the Auckland Heroes for the second time to eliminate them from the competition.

In the grand final on 12 October, which was played in Christchurch's Rugby League Park, Waikato defeated Canterbury 34–18 to win both the Challenge Cup and the Rugby League Cup.

After the victory, Lion Breweries' Kevin Moore declared that the Cougars deserved a public parade.

Team	Total
Waikato Cougars	34
Canterbury Reds	18

=== National School's Competition ===
Aranui High School upset St. Paul's College, defeating them 48–6 in the final held at Rugby League Park. Mark Leafa, Wairangi Koopu and Henry Perenara all competed in the competition, for De Le Salle, Rakaumanga and Lynfield College respectively.

== Australian competitions ==
The Auckland Warriors competed in the Super League's Telstra Cup Premiership and World Club Championship. They finished 7th in the Super League but made the semi-finals of the World Club Championship. The final of the World Club Championship, between Brisbane and Hunter, was held in Auckland's Ericsson Stadium.

== Club competitions ==
=== Auckland ===
The Glenora Bears won the Super 10 Fox Memorial grand final, beating the Mangere East Hawks 34–14. The Glenora side included Duane Mann, Cliff Beverley, Boycie Nelson and Ben Lythe. Mangere East had finished the season as minor premiers while Marist won the Roope Rooster pre-season trophy and Otara won the Stormont Shield. Tukere Barlow from Mangere East won the season's best and fairest award. Mangere East also included George Tuakura and Anthony Seuseu.

This was the first year of the Super 10 competition. The ten teams involved were: Glenora, Mangere East, Northcote, Marist/Roskill, Otahuhu, Manurewa, Manukau, Te Atatu, the Central Sharks and Ellerslie. Mt Albert, Mt Wellington, Hibiscus Coast and Richmond applied to join the competition but were unsuccessful. The Central Sharks consisted of Richmond, Ponsonby, Mt Albert and City-Pt Chev.

Richmond defeated Hibiscus Coast 30–20 in the final of the Sharman Cup.

Willie Wolfgramm played for Marist while Don Stewart and Paul Rauhihi played for the Northcote Tigers. Otahuhu included Dean Clark and Hare Te Rangi. In the regional cup, James Leuluai coached Mt Wellington, Brian McClennan coached the Hibiscus Coast Raiders and Fred Ah Kuoi coached the Richmond Bulldogs.

=== Wellington ===
The Upper Hutt Tigers won the Appleton Shield. The team included Denvour Johnston.

=== Canterbury ===
Hornby, coached by former Kiwi Wayne Wallace, and Papanui met in the Canterbury Rugby League grand final. Hornby defended the Pat Smith Challenge Trophy 20–12. Mark Nixon played for Hornby but missed the final due to injury however Simon Angell did appear in the final. Blair Harding played for Papanui while Phil Prescott coached Halswell.

West Coast's Cobden-Kohinoor Kea's won the Thacker Shield match against Hornby, defeating them 30–10.

=== Other Competitions ===
The Otaika Eagles, led by Jason Mackie, defeated the Hokianga Pioneers 23–20 in the Northland Rugby League grand final. This was the first year of a Northland wide competition.

The Taniwharau Rugby League Club won the Waikato Rugby League title, defeated Turangawaewae 21–20 in the grand final. Kevin Fisher coached Huntly South.

Putaruru United won the Rotorua-Midlands competition for a second year in a row, defeating Pikiao 18–10. The Turanga Panthers defeated the Paikea Whalers 44–32 to win the Gisborne-East Coast Rugby League grand final. Ranginui won the Coastline grand final 30–22 over Te Paamu. However, Te Paamu won a Rotorua/Coastline combined Super 12 competition, defeating Taupo 42–12 in the final.

The Western Suburbs Tigers defeated the Waitara Bears 30–28 in the Taranaki Rugby League grand final. Otaki defeated Castlecliff 34–18 in the Manawatu Rugby League grand final. In the Hawke's Bay, Taradale won their fourth consecutive title. They defeated the Napier Bulldogs 29–28.

In the South Island, the Whakatu Firebirds defeated the Motueka Tigers 28–4 in the Tasman Rugby League grand final and Cobden-Kohinoor won the West Coast Rugby League competition, defeating Waro-Rakau 20–6. South Pacific won the Otago Rugby League club competition, beating the Wakatipu Cougars 32–24. He Tauaa defeated Bluff 40–16 in the Southland Rugby League grand final.
