= 1996 New Zealand rugby league season =

Seasons
- 1995 1997

The 1996 New Zealand rugby league season was the 89th season of rugby league that had been played in New Zealand. The main feature of the year was the final season of the Lion Red Cup competition that was run by the New Zealand Rugby League. The Counties Manukau Heroes won the Cup by defeating the Waitakere City Raiders 34–22 in the Grand Final. With the outbreak of the Super League war the New Zealand Rugby League sided with the Super League organisation.

== International competitions ==
The New Zealand national rugby league team hosted both Papua New Guinea and Great Britain in 1996, winning all five matches. New Zealand were coached by Frank Endacott and included; Richie Barnett, Richard Blackmore, Marc Ellis, Syd Eru, Sean Hoppe, Mark Horo, Tony Iro, Stacey Jones, Stephen Kearney, Gene Ngamu, Quentin Pongia, captain Matthew Ridge, Tyran Smith, Logan and Anthony Swann, John Timu, Joe Vagana, Ruben Wiki and Grant Young. Marc Ellis became the countries 36th dual-code rugby international.

PNG toured first and were defeated 62–8 in Rotorua and 64–0 in Manawatu. They also lost tour matches to the Lion Red Cup XIII, 22–24, and New Zealand Māori side, 14–40. Great Britain then arrived for a three match series. They were defeated 17–12 at Ericsson Stadium, 18–15 in Manawatu and 32–12 at Lancaster Park in Christchurch. Great Britain drew with the Lion Red Cup XIII but lost to the New Zealand XIII and the New Zealand Māori sides.

The Lion Red Cup XIII also played both sides and embarrassed the Great Britain Lions when they held them to a 22-all draw at Carlaw Park. The team was coached by Graeme Norton and included Boycie Nelson, Tama Hohaia, Marlon Gardiner, Richard Stewart, David Bailey, captain Tukere Barlow, Ben Lythe, Don Stewart, Leamy Tato, Anthony Edwards, Gareth Adams, Jonathan Hughes, Corrie Jamieson, Cheaf Lee Fakavamoeanga, Vilai Kelemete, Vai Afoa and Gus Malietoa-Brown. Another New Zealand combination containing Warriors reserves players then managed to defeat Great Britain 30–22 at Fraser Park. The team was: David Murray, Iva Ropati, Anthony Swann, Whetu Taewa, Richard Stewart; Shane Endacott, Aaron Whittaker, Brady Malam, Denvour Johnston, Hitro Okesene, Tony Tatupu, Bryan Henare, Logan Swann. Subs: Meti Noovao, Mark Faumuina, Jerry Seuseu, Darryn Avery. Tukere Barlow captained the Lion Red Cup XIII against Papua New Guinea.

The New Zealand Māori rugby league team was involved in the 1996 Pacific Challenge, a replacement for the postponed Oceania Cup. New Zealand Māori won both their matches, defeating Tonga 28-18 and Western Samoa 39–16. The Māori side included Frank Watene, Paul Rauhihi and Matthew Sturm. Doc Murray, Whetu Taewa, Gavin Hill, Sonny Whakarau, and Tawera Nikau were all added to the squad for the match against Papua New Guinea, which the Māori won 40–14. The Māori team then finished an undefeated season by upsetting Great Britain 40–28. The New Zealand Māori side was: Doc Murray; John Farrar, Ricky Henry, Whetu Taewa, Jason Walker; Jamie Stevens, Paul Howell; Paul Rauhihi, Tukere Barlow, Gavin Hill, David Pearce, Matthew Sturm, Tawera Nikau (capt). Substitutes: Neville Ramsay, Marlon Gardiner, George Milner, Sonny Whakarau. Coach: Cameron Bell.

Graeme Norton coached the New Zealand Nines team that competed in the Super League Nines tournament in Fiji. The side won the title, New Zealand's first world trophy. The squad consisted of captain Sean Hoppe, John Kirwan, Stephen Kearney, Nigel Vagana, Gene Ngamu, Tony Tatupu, Gavin Hill, Mark Carter, Stacey Jones, Tony Iro, Richie Barnett, Henry Paul, Ruben Wiki and Latham Tawhai.

The New Zealand University side competed in the Student World Cup and finished third behind Samoa and Australia.

The Junior Kiwis played five matches as curtain raisers to the five test matches. They won all five matches. Coached by Lex Clarke and managed by Ross Taylor, the Junior Kiwis included Joe Galuvao, Lesley Vainikolo, David Kidwell, Hare Te Rangi, Robert Henare, Frank Watene, Matthew Rua, Monty Betham, Kylie Leuluai and Phillip Leuluai.

A New Zealand under-18 team coached by Trevor McLeod bet Fiji under 18s in a two match series. The squad included Joe Galuvao, Lesley Vainikolo, captain David Solomona, Odell Manuel and Kyle Leuluai.

A New Zealand under-16 team played a three match series in Australia, winning all three. The team was coached by Jeff Whittaker and included David Vaealiki, Mark Leafa, Wairangi Koopu and David Fa'alogo.

Matthew Ridge won the New Zealand Rugby League's player of the year award.

== National competitions ==
=== Inter Zone Challenge ===
A North Zone, representing the Waitakere City, Counties Makukau, North Harbour, Waikato and the Bay of Plenty franchises played a three match series against South Zone, representing the Taranaki Rockets, Manawatu Mustangs, Hawkes Bay Unicorns, Hutt Valley Dolphins, Wellington City Dukes, Christchurch City Shiners and the Canterbury Country Cardinals.

North Zone won the three matches 22–16, 21-14 and 38–16.

North Zone were coached by Brian McClennan and included Willie McLean, Brian Jellick, Boycie Nelson, Ben Lythe, captain Clayton Friend, Jerry Seuseu, Stuart Lester, Matthew Sturm and Frank Watene.

South Zone were coached by Andy Moore and included Earl Va'a, Blair Harding, Denvour Johnston and Yogi Rogers.

=== Rugby League Cup ===
Auckland defeated the West Coast 48–10 in a Rugby League Cup challenge to retain the cup. Auckland included Esau Mann, Stuart Lester and Matthew Sturm.

Auckland defeated Canterbury 24–20 at Carlaw Park to retain the Rugby League Cup. Auckland were coached by Dominic Clark and included Ben Lythe, Boycie Nelson, Duane Mann, Donald Stewart, Matthew Sturm, Willie McLean and Frank Watene. Canterbury included Blair Harding, Mark Nixon and Paul Koloi.

=== Lion Red Cup ===
Due to the postponement of Super League in Australia several top Australian referees were available to referee matches in the Lion Red Cup. These included Steve Clark.

==== Teams ====
- The North Harbour Sea Eagles had a new coach in Dominic Clark. The squad included Paki Tuimavave, Paul Rauhihi, Mike Setefano, Artie Shead, Don Stewart and Latham Tawhai.
- The Waitakere City Raiders finished the year as minor premiers and went on to make the final but could not over come Counties Manukau. The side was coached by Del Hughes and included Boycie Nelson, Willie McLean, Ben Lythe, Brian Jellick, Julian O'Neill and David Bailey.
- The champion Counties Manukau Heroes side was coached by Cameron Bell and included Clayton Friend, Esau Mann, Matthew Sturm, Charlie Kennedy, Stuart Lester, Meti Noovao, Francis Leota, Duane Mann, Frank Watene, Dean Clark, Gus Malietoa-Brown and Jerry Seuseu.
- The Waikato Cougars played their last game at Trust Bank Park in July. The team was coached by Joe Gwynne and included Darryl Fisher, Tama Hohaia and captain Tukere Barlow. Mark Woods played the first two rounds for Waikato before transferring to Bay of Plenty.
- The Bay of Plenty Stags were the big improvers of the competition, making the finals after coming last in the previous two years. They were coached by Lawrence Brydon who took over near the end of the 1995 season. During the season its business manager, former Kiwi coach Tony Gordon, was suspended and investigated by the New Zealand Rugby League. He was later cleared of all charges. The team was captained by Mark Woods and included Patrick Kuru.
- The Taranaki Rockets were coached by former Kiwi Howie Tamati. The squad included Denvour Johnston and Willie Talau.
- The Manawatu Mustangs replaced the Auckland Warriors Colts. They were coached by Peter Sixtus.
- the Hawkes Bay Unicorns were coached by Mark Elia who also played in one match.
- The Hutt Valley Dolphins abandoned the Hawks name altogether in 1996. The team were coached by Ken Laban included Earl Va'a, who moved over from Wellington, Zane Clark, Arnold Lomax and Yogi Rogers.
- The Wellington City Dukes were coached by Mike Edmonds.
- The Christchurch City Shiners were coached by Geoff Carr. Carr was sacked mid season and replaced with Mark Vincent.
- The Canterbury Country Cardinals were coached by Gerard Stokes and included Paul Koloi, Blair Harding, Lusi Sione, Mark Nixon and Paul Johnson.

==== Standings ====
| Team | Pld | W | D | L | PF | PA | PD | Pts |
|---|---|---|---|---|---|---|---|---|
| Waitakere City | 22 | 19 | 0 | 3 | 697 | 342 | 355 | 38 |
| Counties Manukau | 22 | 18 | 0 | 4 | 766 | 399 | 367 | 36 |
| North Harbour | 22 | 15 | 0 | 7 | 624 | 393 | 231 | 30 |
| Waikato | 22 | 13 | 1 | 8 | 515 | 472 | 43 | 27 |
| Bay of Plenty | 22 | 11 | 3 | 8 | 440 | 441 | -1 | 25 |
| Hutt Valley | 22 | 11 | 2 | 9 | 444 | 469 | -25 | 24 |
| Taranaki | 22 | 11 | 0 | 11 | 516 | 438 | 33 | 22 |
| Wellington City | 22 | 9 | 0 | 13 | 536 | 532 | 4 | 18 |
| Hawkes Bay | 22 | 7 | 1 | 14 | 377 | 583 | -206 | 15 |
| Canterbury | 22 | 6 | 1 | 15 | 365 | 555 | -190 | 13 |
| Manawatu | 22 | 5 | 0 | 17 | 404 | 732 | -328 | 10 |
| Christchurch City | 22 | 3 | 0 | 19 | 360 | 643 | -283 | 6 |

==== The playoffs ====
Two time defending champions the North Harbour Sea Eagles were eliminated in the second round when they lost 14–20 to Waikato, despite the Cougars having twelve men for most of the second half.

Qualifying and elimination finals
2 | Counties Manukau | 14
3 | North Harbour | 10
4 | Waikato | 35
5 | Bay of Plenty | 18

Semi-finals
1 | Waitakere City | 26
Counties Manukau | 8
North Harbour | 14
Waikato | 20

Preliminary final
Counties Manukau | 22
Waikato | 6

Grand final
Waitakere City | 22
Counties Manukau | 34

| Match | Winner | | Loser | | Venue |
|---|---|---|---|---|---|
| Elimination Play-off | Waikato Cougars | 35 | Bay of Plenty Stags | 18 | Rotorua International Stadium |
| Preliminary Semifinal | Counties Manukau Heroes | 14 | North Harbour Sea Eagles | 10 | Carlaw Park |
| Elimination Semifinal | Waikato Cougars | 20 | North Harbour Sea Eagles | 14 | Davies Park |
| Qualification Semifinal | Waitakere City Raiders | 26 | Counties Manukau Heroes | 8 | Carlaw Park |
| Preliminary Final | Counties Manukau Heroes | 22 | Waikato Cougars | 6 | Carlaw Park |

===== Grand Final =====
| Waitakere City | Position | Counties Manukau |
|---|---|---|
| Willie McLean | FB | Te Manawa Loza |
| Brian Jellick | WG | Charlie Kennedy |
| Boycie Nelson | CE | Cheaf Lee Fakavamoenga |
| David Bailey | CE | Richard O'Connell |
| Robert Ofanoa | WG | Gus Malietoa-Brown |
| Dean Broomfield (C) | FE | Duane Mann (C) |
| Ben Lythe | HB | Duane Mackwood |
| Carl Findlay | PR | Malu Autagavia |
| Junior Fiu | HK | Esau Mann |
| Greg Ashby | PR | Frank Watene |
| Gareth Adams | SR | Jerry Seuseu |
| Anthony Edwards | SR | Steve Ekepati |
| Jonathan Hughes | LK | Matthew Sturm |
| Alan Li'o | Bench | Neville Ramsay |
| George Milner | Bench | Francis Leota |
| Graham Fafuiti | Bench | Mark Lethbridge |
| Wayne Kohlhase | Bench | Ray Barchard |
| Del Hughes | Coach | Cameron Bell |

The Grand Final was played in front of a disappointing crowd of just under 2,000 fans at Carlaw Park. Jim Stokes refereed the match which Waitakere City led 16–8 at halftime. However Counties Manukau came back to win 34-22 and claim their first Lion Red Cup.

| Team | Halftime | Total |
|---|---|---|
| Counties Manukau Heroes | 6 | 34 |
| Waitakere City Raiders | 18 | 22 |

| Tries (Counties Manukau) | 2: G Malietoa-Brown |
| | 1: D. Mann, E. Mann, N. Ramsay, F. Watene, C. Kennedy |
| Tries (Waitakere City) | 3. B. Nelson |
| | 1: D. Bailey |
| Goals (Counties Manukau) | 3: T. Loza |
| Goals (Waitakere City) | 3: B. Lythe |
| Venue | Carlaw Park |

=== Awards ===
- Player of the Year: Jerry Seuseu (Counties Manukau)
- Coach of the Year: Cameron Bell (Counties Manukau)
- Rookie of the Year: Darryl Fisher (Waikato)
- Captain of the Year: Mark Woods (Bay of Plenty)
- Best and Fairest: Paul Howell (Wellington City)
- Most Tries: Cheaf Lee Fakavamoenga (21 – Counties Manukau)
- Most Goals: Ben Lythe (109 – Waitakere City)
- Most Points: Ben Lythe (240 – Waitakere City)
- Referee of the Year: Jim Stokes (Canterbury)

=== Inter-Club Knockout Series ===
Cobden-Kohinoor defeated the Kaikohe Lions 40–22 in the Inter-club knockout series. The series was for provinces which did not have a team in the Lion Red Cup.

Round of 16
Cobden-Kohinoor (W.Coast) | 44
Whakatu (Nelson-M) | 16
Waro-rakau (W.Coast) | 82
Tahunanui (Nelson-M) | 0
Pacific Raiders (Otago) | 34
Whakatipu (Sthland) | 6
He Tauaa (Sthland)
St Kilda (Otago) | Default
Kaikohe Lions (Nthland) | 40
Mt Maunganui (Coastline) | 30
Te Paamu (Coastline) | 28
Whangatautia (Nthland) | 26
Turanga (Gisborne-EC) | 38
Takahiwai (Nthland) | 36
Hokianga Pioneers (Nthland) | 54
Paikea (Gisborne-EC) | 24

Quarter-finals
Cobden-Kohinoor | 11
Waro-rakau | 10
Pacific Raiders | 18
He Tauaa | 36
Kaikohe Lions | 26
Te Paamu | 24
Turanga | 48
Hokianga Pioneers | 36

Semi-finals
Cobden-Kohinoor | 33
He Tauaa | 12
Kaikohe Lions | 60
Turanga | 22

Grand Final
Cobden-Kohinoor | 40
Kaikohe Lions | 22

== Australian competitions ==
The Auckland Warriors competed in the Australian Rugby League competition finishing 11th out of 20 teams.

The Reserve Grade team made the grand final, losing to the Cronulla Sharks reserve team 14–12.

== Club competitions ==
=== Auckland ===
The Otara Scorpions won the Auckland Rugby League Fox Memorial for the first time. They defeated Otahuhu 36-28 after the match went into triple extra time. Otahuhu were the minor premiers and also won the Stormont Shield. The Manurewa Marlins won the pre-season Roope Rooster tournament.

The Glenora Bears won the second division Sharman Cup.

Peter Feau (Otahuhu) won the Lipscombe Cup as Sportsman of the Year, Matthew Sturm won the Rothville Trophy as Player of the Year, Milton Ross (Ellerslie) won the Burt Humphries Trophy as the Most Improved Forward while Lionel Periera (Manurewa) was the Most Improved Back. Ronald Kite (Otara) won the John Hyland Memorial Cup as coach of the year.

Otahuhu included Francis Leota, Phillip Leuluai and Odell Manuel.

=== Wellington ===
The Randwick Kingfishers won the Wellington Rugby League's Appleton Shield, defeating Paremata 38–8 in the Grand Final.

Zane Clarke played for Randwick.

=== Canterbury ===
Hornby won the Canterbury Rugby League's Pat Smith Trophy, defeating Halswell 22–16 in the Grand Final.

The Thacker Shield was not contested due to Waro-rakau having other commitments.

Halswell's Darryn Avery won the Outstanding Player of the Year award. Tony Sweetman (Linwood) won sportsman of the year. Shane Beyers (Halswell) and Don Aitken (Hornby) shared the Junior Sportsman of the Year award.

Wayne Wallace coached Hornby who included Mark Nixon.

=== Other Competitions ===
The Bay of Islands defeated Whangarei 28–24 in an inter-district match. The Kaikohe Lions beat the Hokianga Pioneers 22-21 after extra time in the Bay of Islands competition while the Whangatauatia Mountain Men beat the Pawarenga Broncos 24–12 in the Far North competition and the Takahiwai Warriors beat the Otaika Eagles 12–4 at Jubilee Park in the Whangarei premiership.

Turangawaewae won the Waikato Rugby League grand final. Taniwharau were the minor premiers in all four grades. The Waitara Bears defeated Western Suburbs 29–16 in the Taranaki Rugby League grand final.

The Putaruru United beat Pikiao 35–8 in the Rotorua Midlands final while Kaiti beat Turanga 36–12 in the Gisbourne-East Coast Premiership. The Turanga Panthers won the Gisborne-East Coast title. Taradale defeated Tamatea 32–0 in the Hawke's Bay Rugby League championship. Otaki Whiti Te Ra defeated Kia Ora 27–20 in the Manawatu Rugby League Final.

Waru-rakau retained the West Coast Rugby League title, defeating Marist in the Grand Final. Marist included Wayne Dwyer. Otago did not play a representative fixture during the season for the first time in over 80 years. The Otago competition featured four teams. The Gore Cup, a fixture between the champion Otago and Canterbury clubs, was contested for the first time since 1929. Eastern Suburbs defeated South Pacific 44–32. He Tauaa won the Southland Rugby League Grand Final, defeating the Wakitipu Cougars 22–18. The Cougars had played in the Otago competition in 1995.
