= 1993 New Zealand rugby league season =

Seasons
- 1992 1994

The 1993 New Zealand rugby league season was the 86th season of rugby league that had been played in New Zealand. The main feature of the year was the National Provincial Championship competition that was run by the New Zealand Rugby League. Canterbury won the Championship by defeating Auckland 36–12 in the Final.

== International competitions ==
The New Zealand national rugby league team drew 14-all with the Kangaroos at Mt Smart Stadium. This was the first ever draw between the two countries. They then lost 8–16 at the Palmerston North Showgrounds before finishing the test series by going down 4–16 in Brisbane. The New Zealand squad was: Morvin Edwards, Sean Hoppe, Jarrod McCracken, Dave Watson, Daryl Halligan, Tea Ropati, Gary Freeman (C), Se'e Solomona, Duane Mann, Brent Todd, Gary Mercer, Quentin Pongia, Tawera Nikau, Tony Kemp, Brendon Tuuta, Jason Donnelly, Stephen Kearney, Gavin Hill and John Lomax while Howie Tamati was the coach and Richard Bolton was the manager.

New Zealand then toured Great Britain and France, beating Wales, Wigan, St Helens, Widnes, Leeds, France and the Great Britain under 23's but losing to Bradford Northern, Castleford and all three tests against Great Britain. The 26-man squad included Peter Edwards, Jason Williams, Whetu Taewa, Blair Harding, Mark Nixon, Iva Ropati, Gene Ngamu, Aaron Whittaker, Brent Stuart, Jason Lowrie, Paul Johnson, Denvour Johnston, Robert Piva, Jason Mackie, Logan Edwards, David Lomax, Simon Angell and the players from the Australian series except for Tony Kemp and Gavin Hill who had taken up contracts in England. This was the first time that no Auckland-based players were in the squad.

Before the test matches a trial match was held. The Howie Tamati coached Possibles defeated the Ken Campbell Probables 16–12 at Carlaw Park on 6 June. The Teams were; Possibles: Peter Edwards, Mike Dorreen, Dave Watson, Craig Innes, Iva Ropati, Tea Ropati, Aaron Whittaker, Se'e Solomona, Denvour Johnston, Brent Stuart, Robert Piva, Brendon Tuuta, Tawera Nikau (C). Bench: Earl Va'a, Mark Woods, Jason Walker, Duane Mann. Probables: Dave Murray, Vae Afoa, Vila Matautia, Jason Gilbert, Whetu Taewa, Mark Nixon, Darryl Beazley, Paul Johnson, Syd Eru, George Mann, Mark Faumuina, Gary Mercer, Jason Mackie.Bench: Maea David, Logan Edwards, Ken McIntosh, George Perham. Dean Clark, Richie Barnett and Simon Angell withdrew from the trial teams due to injury.

The Junior Kiwis toured Great Britain and, coached by Frank Endacott, they won 11 of their 12 matches. The squad included captain Henry Paul, Peter Lima, Meti Noovao, Gus Malietoa-Brown, David Fatialofa, Willie Swann, Alex Chan, Tevita Vaikona, Danny Lima, Bryan Henare and Joe Vagana.

The New Zealand Māori side played three matches against provincial opposition. During the year the team included Syd Eru, Arnold Lomax, Darryl Beazley, Richie Barnett, Yogi Rogers, Alex Chan, David Lomax, Phil Bergman, Jason Mackie, Blair Harding, David Bailey, Mark Woods and Tukere Barlow.

The Wainuiomata Lions represented New Zealand at the World Sevens in Sydney. The squad included Tana Umaga, Maika Felise and David Lomax. Joe Vagana, Peter Lima and Tony Tuimavave were all included in the Western Samoan team.

== National competitions ==
=== Rugby League Cup ===
Canterbury opened their season with a 40–12 defeat of Auckland to defend the Rugby League Cup. They then defeated Wellington and Bay of Plenty to hold the Cup for another season.

=== National Provincial Championship ===
The Provincial championship included a final for the first time.

==== First Division ====
- Auckland were coached by Owen Wright. For the first time in a season Auckland lost to two different provinces and lost more than two domestic games. They did however draw with the Manly Sea Eagles 16-all at Carlaw Park in a warm up match before losing twice to the Gold Coast Seagulls 4–30 and 10–18. Auckland included Richie Barnett, Ruben Wiki, Mark Elia, David Bailey, Ken McIntosh, Se'e Solomona, Iva Ropati, Darryl Beazley, Francis Leota, Tony Tatupu, Tony Tuimavave, Brady Malam, Willie Poching, Joe Vagana, Peter Lima, Des Maea, Hitro Okesene, Dean Clark and David Murray. Early in the season an Auckland Invitational XIII drew 16-all with the Balmain Tigers. The Invitational side included Syd Eru, John Lomax, Brent Stuart and Whetu Taewa from outside the district.
- Bay of Plenty included form Bradford Northern player Russell Stewart as player-coach, Junior Kiwi Alex Chan and Paul Nahu.
- Canterbury was coached by Frank Endacott and captained by Mark Nixon. The team included Phil Bergman, Brendon Tuuta, Mike Doreen, Logan Edwards, Marty Crequer, Andrew Vincent, Whetu Taewa, Aaron Whittaker, Simon Angell, Justin Wallace, Brent Stuart, Paul Johnson and Blair Harding.
- Wellington included Syd Eru, Denvour Johnston, Peter Edwards, captain Mark Woods, James Goulding, Paul Howell, Mike Kuiti, Robert Piva, Earl Va'a and David Lomax. Wellington had a chance to make the final but couldn't defeat Canterbury in their final match, gifting the final spot to Auckland.

Team	Pld	W	L	PF	PA	Pts
Canterbury	6	5	1	162	61	10
Auckland	6	4	2	118	101	8
Wellington	6	3	3	135	118	6
Bay of Plenty	6	0	6	40	175	0

===== The Final =====
For the final Auckland called up several professionals who had recently returned from England; Tawera Nikau, Se'e Solomona, Duane Mann, Tea Ropati, Craig Innes and Iva Ropati. Canterbury only called up Brendon Tuuta for the final. Canterbury won 36–12 in front of a capacity 10,000 fans at the Addington Showgrounds.

==== North Island Second Division ====
Defending champions Northland again won the North Island Second Division title. The team included Jason Mackie.

Waikato included Tukere Barlow and Martin Moana and were coached by Cecil Kells.

Taranaki included Dave Watson. Robert Piva also played for Taranaki in a one-off match against the New Zealand Māori rugby league team.

Team	Pld	W	L	PF	PA	Pts
Northland	5	4	1	152	99	8
Hawke's Bay	5	4	1	167	144	8
Waikato	5	3	2	204	122	6
Taranaki	5	3	2	152	109	6
Manawatu	5	1	4	179	158	2
Gisborne-East Coast	5	0	5	58	290	0

==== South Island Second Division ====
- The Canterbury Emerging Players team included Shane Endacott.
- After the season ended an Otago Invitation side, including Mark Elia and Francis Leota, played New Zealand Māori. The Māori won 39–18.

Team	Pld	W	L	PF	PA	Pts
Canterbury Emerging Players	3	3	0	108	24	6
West Coast	3	2	1	96	50	4
Southland	3	1	2	23	102	2
Otago	3	0	3	26	77	0

== Club competitions ==
=== Auckland ===
The Northcote Tigers, coached by Gary Kemble, won the Fox Memorial by defeating the Ron O'Regan coached Te Atatu Roosters 29–10 in the grand final. Northcote also won the Rukutai Shield (minor premiership) and pre-season Roope Rooster. The Mt Albert Lions won the Stormont Shield. Northcote included Mark Elia, Ken McIntosh, Don Stewart and Willie Poching, who had transferred from Mt Albert in the off season.

The Marist Saints defeated the Hibiscus Coast Raiders 27–16 to win the Sharman Cup while the Glenfield Greyhounds won the Phelan Shield by defeating the Manurewa Marlins 26–12.

Solomon Kiri was the top try scorer, scoring 16 tries for the Mangere East Hawks.

Marist included Willie Swann, Manukau included Hitro Okesene, the Richmond Bulldogs included Paki Tuimavave and Mike Setefano, while Te Atatu included David Bailey, Robbie Paul and Henry Paul. Glenora included Matthew Sturm, Tony Tatupu played for Mt Albert, David Murray and Aaron Lester played for Ellerslie

An Auckland Development squad toured Sydney and won all three games. The team was coached by John Ackland included Awen Guttenbeil and Stacey Jones from Pt Chevalier and Frank Watene from Otahuhu.

After the success of the 1992 Pacific Cup, the Auckland Rugby League hosted a Polynesian rugby league festival at Carlaw Park. Auckland Tonga, who included Willie Wolfgramm and Esau Mann, won the cup, defeating Auckland Māori 16–8. Auckland Māori included Solomon Kiri. An Auckland XIII defeated Auckland American Samoa 40–35 in the plate final.

=== Wellington ===
The Upper Hutt Tigers upset the Wainuiomata Lions 30–10 in the final of the Wellington Rugby League competition. Wainuiomata had suffered just one loss in the three rounds of the Appleton Shield.

David Lomax won the Colin O'Neil best and fairest award.

Upper Hutt were captained by Mark Woods and included Peter Edwards and Syd Eru. Wainuiomata included Earl Va'a, David Lomax and Jason Gilbert. Porirua City included Robert Piva while Petone were coached by James Leuluai and included Paul Howell.

=== Canterbury ===
Minor premiers Halswell, coached by Ged Stokes and including captain Glenn Coughlan, Aaron Whittaker and Whetu Taewa, defeated Hornby 8–6 in the final to win the Pat Smith Trophy. Horbny included Marty Crequer, Mark Nixon and Simon Angell.

Whetu Taewa won the Canterbury Rugby League player of the year award.

=== Northland ===
The Takahiwai Warriors, led by player-coach Jason Mackie, won the Northland superleague, defeating the Ngatikahu Sharks 38–10.

The Portland Panthers won the Whangarei City & Districts title, by defeating Takahiwai Warriors 24–8 at Jubilee Park, Whangārei.

The Hokianga Pioneers, coached by Phil Marsh, won the Bay of Islands title, by defeating the Moerewa Tigers 14–11.

Ngati Kahu Sharks won the Far North District rugby league championship title, by defeating the Te Paatu Warriors 12–6.

Tony Tuimavave played for the Kaikohe Lions in the Bay of Islands championship.

=== Other Competitions ===
The Hamilton City Tigers won the 1993 Waikato Rugby League competition, defeating Ngaruawahia 50–10 to complete the season undefeated. The Tigers included Tukere Barlow. The Taniwharau Rugby League Club included Huntly College sixth former Steve Berryman and Huntly South included Martin Moana.

The Piako Warriors defeated the Ngongotaha Chiefs 16–14 in the Bay of Plenty Rugby League final. The Waitara Bears completed an undefeated season by demolishing the Coastal Cobras 68–10 in the Taranaki Rugby League grand final, the fourth consecutive time the Bears had lifted the title.

Chagan Uawa defeated the Repangaere Eels 12–8 to win the Gisborne-East Coast championship. Defending champions Tamatea retained the Hawke's Bay Rugby League title with a 60–12 win in the grand final over the Taradale Eagles.

Kia Ora, coached by Peter Sixtus, won the Manawatu Rugby League championship by defeating Tainui 38–22 in the grand final.

The Waro-rakau Hornets won the West Coast title after defeating Cobden 22–6.
