= 1997 Oceania Cup =

- Number of teams: 6
- Host country: New Zealand
- Winner: New Zealand Residents
- Matches played: 12

The 1997 Oceania Cup was an international rugby league football tournament played in the Pacific region. The tournament was operated and contested by Super League-aligned countries during the Super League war as an alternative to the Pacific Cup.

Six teams contested the Cup. The 1997 tournament went ahead following the previous year's cancellation due to the unavailability of Australian teams when the tournament was replaced with a Pacific Challenge Series. Western Samoa withdrew from the tournament in disagreement with Super League-aligned authorities over promises that they believed were given to them.

The tournament was originally scheduled to have two pools, one based in New Zealand and one in Tonga, and the final was to be played as a curtain raiser to the Super League Tri-series final.

== Teams ==
New Zealand Māori were coached by Cameron Bell and included Dean Clark, Tukere Barlow, Frank Watene, Darryl Beazley and Solomon Kiri.

New Zealand Residents were coached by Gary Kemble and included Glenn Coughlan, Blair Harding, Mike Dorreen, Iva Ropati, Shane Endacott, captain Aaron Whittaker, Mark Faumuina, Denvour Johnston, Hitro Okesene, Jerry Seuseu, Bryan Henare, Meti Noovao, Brad Williams, Joe Galuvao, Fa'ausu Afoa, Ben Fahey, Jason Kerapa, Keneti Asiata and Paul Staladi. Richard Stewart replaced Shane Endacott when he withdrew due to injury. Before the series began the New Zealand Māori bet the New Zealand Residents 21-19 at Ericsson Stadium.

== Results ==
=== Group stage ===
==== Round 1 ====
11 May 1997

Cook Islands	22 – 14	Fiji

Carlaw Park, Auckland

11 May 1997

New Zealand Residents	21 – 18	Papua New Guinea

Carlaw Park, Auckland

11 May 1997

Māori	46 – 10	Tonga

Carlaw Park, Auckland

==== Round 2 ====
13 May 1997

Māori	32 – 12	Fiji

Carlaw Park, Auckland

13 May 1997

New Zealand Residents	32 – 10	Tonga

Carlaw Park, Auckland

13 May 1997

Papua New Guinea	34 – 12	Cook Islands

Carlaw Park, Auckland

==== Round 3 ====
15 May 1997

New Zealand Residents	46 – 2	Cook Islands

Carlaw Park, Auckland

15 May 1997

Tonga	14 – 14	Fiji

Carlaw Park, Auckland

15 May 1997

Māori	34 – 6	Papua New Guinea

Carlaw Park, Auckland

==== Table ====
	Team	Pld	W	D	L	PF	PA	PD	Pts
1	Māori	3	3	0	0	112	28	84	6
2	New Zealand Residents	3	3	0	0	99	30	69	6
3	Papua New Guinea	3	1	0	2	58	67	-9	2
4	Cook Islands	3	1	0	2	36	94	-58	2
5	Fiji	3	0	1	2	40	68	-28	1
6	Tonga	3	0	1	2	34	92	-58	1

=== Knock-out stage ===
==== 5th place play-off ====
18 May 1997

Fiji	22 – 20	Tonga

Carlaw Park, Auckland

==== 3rd place play-off ====
18 May 1997

Papua New Guinea	38 – 14	Cook Islands

Carlaw Park, Auckland

==== Final ====
18 May 1997

New Zealand Residents	20 – 15	Māori
Tries: Paul Staladi (2); Darryn Avery; Fa'asu Afoa; Goals: Glenn Coughlan (2)		Tries: Ricky Henry; Shane Edwards; Goals: Tama Hohaia (3, 1 FG)

Carlaw Park, Auckland
Referee: Jim Stokes
