= Maea David =

NZ rugby league footballer (born 1972)

Personal information
- Full name: Kuki K David
- Born: 27 February 1972 (age 53); Samoa

Playing information
- Height: 178 cm (5 ft 10 in)
- Weight: 118 kg (18 st 8 lb)

Rugby league
- Position: Centre
Club
Years	Team	Pld	T	G	FG	P
	Papanui (CRL)
1994	Canterbury Cardinals	18	4	0	0	16
1994–96	Hull FC	29	8	0	0	32
1996–97	Illawarra Steelers	11	0	0	0	0
1998	Hull FC	1	0	0	0	0
1999	Bramley RLFC	1	0	0	0	0
2000	Featherstone Rovers	25	0	0	0	0
2001–03	Doncaster RLFC	74	7	0	0	28
	Total	159	19	0	0	76
Representative
Years	Team	Pld	T	G	FG	P
1992–??	Canterbury

Rugby union
Club
Years	Team	Pld	T	G	FG	P
	Hull RUFC

Maea David (born 27 February 1972) is a New Zealand rugby union coach and former professional rugby league footballer who played professionally in England and Australia.

== Playing career ==
David played in the Canterbury Rugby League competition for the Papanui Tigers and made his Canterbury début in 1992. He also made the Kiwi Colts that year. David made the 1993 New Zealand national rugby league team trials but did not make the final squad. He played for the Canterbury Country Cardinals in the inaugural Lion Red Cup.

In 1994, he signed with Hull FC, and moved to England.

He spent the 1996 and 1997 seasons with the Illawarra Steelers, playing in 11 first grade matches.

David then returned to Hull for 1998's Super League III season.

David also played for Featherstone Rovers and Doncaster Dragons.

== Later years ==
David joined the Hull RUFC, playing for the club before becoming the backs coach under former teammate, Tevita Vaikona.
