= Canterbury Country Cardinals =

Defunct NZ rugby league club, based in Canterbury

Club information
- Nickname: The Reds
- Founded: 1994; 32 years ago
- Exited: 1996; 30 years ago

Former details
- Ground: Addington Showgrounds
- Coach: Gerard Stokes
- Competition: Lion Red Cup

The Canterbury Country Cardinals were a New Zealand rugby league club that represented Canterbury in the Lion Red Cup from 1994 to 1996. They were administered by the Canterbury Rugby League.

The Country Cardinals drew from the Halswell, Papanui, Hornby, Lincoln University and Marist-Western Suburbs clubs.

== Notable players ==
Notable players included Glen Coughlan, Phil Bancroft, Logan Edwards, Shane Endacott, Paul Johnson, Blair Harding, Mark Nixon, Henry Suluvale, David Kidwell, Marty Crequer, Tevita Vaikona and Aaron Whittaker.

== Season Results ==
Season	Pld	W	D	L	PF	PA	PD	Pts	Position	Finals
1994	22	15	2	5	615	410	205	32	Fourth	Lost Preliminary Final
1995	22	9	2	11	446	448	-2	20	Tenth	N/A
1996	22	6	1	15	365	555	-190	13	Tenth	N/A
