= Daroa Ben-Moide =

PNG international rugby league footballer

Personal information
- Born: Papua New Guinea

Playing information
- Position: Hooker, Prop, Second-row
Club
Years	Team	Pld	T	G	FG	P
	Port Moresby Vipers
1988–89	Petone
	Total	0	0	0	0	0
Representative
Years	Team	Pld	T	G	FG	P
1988–89	Wellington
1988–94	Papua New Guinea	6	0	0	0	0

Daroa Ben-Moide is a Papua New Guinean rugby league player who represented Papua New Guinea.

== Playing career ==
Ben-Moide played for the Port Moresby Vipers.

He spent the 1988 season playing for Petone in the Wellington Rugby League competition. He also represented Wellington.

He played in six Test Matches for Papua New Guinea between 1988 and 1994.
