= Patrick Kuru =

Cook Island rugby league footballer

Playing information
- Position: Second-row
Club
Years	Team	Pld	T	G	FG	P
1996	Bay of Plenty	19	4	0	0	16
Representative
Years	Team	Pld	T	G	FG	P
1997–04	Cook Islands

Patrick Kuru is a Cook Island former professional rugby league footballer who played as a second-row forward in the 1990s, 2000s and 2010s. He played at representative level for the Cook Islands, and at club level for the Bay of Plenty Stags and the Altona Roosters.

== Playing career ==
Kuru played for the Bay of Plenty Stags in the 1996 Lion Red Cup, scoring two tries in the semi-final defeat by Waikato.

As of 2010, Kuru plays for the Altona Roosters in the Victorian Rugby League competition. Kuru captained the squad to the 2010 title. He was chosen in an Australian Affiliated national side in 2005, representing Victoria.

== Representative career ==
Kuru made his début for the Cook Islands at the 1997 World Nines tournament.

He was then picked in the 2000 Rugby League World Cup squad.

Kuru later represented the Cook Islands in test series against New Zealand Māori in 2003 and Fiji in 2004.
