= Bill Kells =

New Zealand international rugby league footballer and coach

Personal information
- Full name: William Robert Kells
- Born: 11 February 1958 (age 68) New Zealand

Playing information
- Position: Stand-off
Club
Years	Team	Pld	T	G	FG	P
	Ngaruwahia (WRL)
1983–84	Bradford Northern
	Total	0	0	0	0	0
Representative
Years	Team	Pld	T	G	FG	P
	Waikato
1980	New Zealand
1984–??	Northern Districts

William Robert Kells is a New Zealand former rugby league footballer, and coach who represented New Zealand.

== Playing career ==
From the Huntly area, Kells was a Waikato representative and was selected in the New Zealand national rugby league team squad in 1980. Kells spent the 1982/83 season with Bradford Northern in England.

== Coaching career ==
In 1997 and 1998 Kells coached Waikato. Waikato won the 1997 National Provincial Competition.

He coached Northern Districts in 2001 against France. In 2003 Kells was the co-coach of the Ngaruawahia Panthers in the Waikato Rugby League.
