= Paul Johnson (rugby league, born 1970) =

New Zealand rugby league footballer (born 1970)

Personal information
- Full name: Paul Frederick Johnson
- Born: 24 July 1970 (age 55)
- Height: 179 cm (5 ft 10 in)
- Weight: 98 kg (15 st 6 lb)

Playing information
- Position: Prop
Club
Years	Team	Pld	T	G	FG	P
	Papanui (CRL)
1994–96	Canterbury Cardinals	20	2	0	0	8
	Total	20	2	0	0	8
Representative
Years	Team	Pld	T	G	FG	P
1993–95	Canterbury
1993	New Zealand		0	0	0	0

Paul Frederick Johnson (born 24 July 1970) is a New Zealand former professional rugby league footballer who represented New Zealand.

== Playing career ==
A Papanui Tigers player in the Canterbury Rugby League competition, Johnson played for Papanui Tigers from 1989 to 1993 after playing Rugby Union for the Christchurch Rugby Club. During this period Johnson played for the Canterbury Emerging Players Team in 1991 and 1992.

In 1993 to 1995 Johnson was selected in the Canterbury Team and was in the side that bet Auckland in 1993, coming off the bench in the Provincial grand final.

Johnson was then named in the touring squad for the 1993 New Zealand national rugby league team tour of Great Britain and France, replacing an injured Brent Todd. However, Paul wasn't selected to play in a test and therefore not an official Kiwi.

Johnson did not play a test while on tour but played in several tour matches against domestic sides.

Johnson played for the Canterbury Cardinals side that played in the Lion Red Cup between 1994 and 1996. His 1994 season was interrupted by a broken leg but he bounced back to make the New Zealand Residents in 1995.

In 1996 and 1997 Johnson played for the Entrance Rugby League Club in the Central Coast, New South Wales competition.
