= Andrew Vincent =

New Zealand rugby league footballer

Personal information
- Born: New Zealand

Playing information
- Position: Five-eighth
Club
Years	Team	Pld	T	G	FG	P
	Unknown (CRL)
1988	North Sydney Bears	1	0	0	0	0
1989–90	Doncaster RLFC	20	2	0	0	8
1990	Dewsbury Rams	6	1	0	3	7
1990–91	Bramley R.L.F.C.	20	4	0	0	16
1994	Christchurch City Shiners
	Total	47	7	0	3	31
Representative
Years	Team	Pld	T	G	FG	P
1990–93	Canterbury

Andrew Vincent is a New Zealand former professional rugby league footballer who played for the North Sydney Bears.

== Playing career ==
A junior in the Canterbury Rugby League competition, Vincent played for the Junior Kiwis in 1985 and 1986. He was selected for the New Zealand Māori squad at the 1986 Pacific Cup, but had to pull out due to injury. He spent the 1988 NSWRL season in Sydney with the North Sydney Bears, playing in one first grade match.

He then returned to New Zealand and became a regular in the Canterbury side. In 1994, with the launch of the Lion Red Cup, Vincent joined the Christchurch City Shiners.
