= Vaun O'Callaghan =

New Zealand international rugby league footballer

Personal information
- Full name: Vaun Jon O'Callaghan
- Born: 9 January 1966 (age 59) Waikato, New Zealand

Playing information
- Position: Fullback
Club
Years	Team	Pld	T	G	FG	P
19??–87	Huntly South (WRL)
<1989–90	Otahuhu Leopards
	Total	0	0	0	0	0
Representative
Years	Team	Pld	T	G	FG	P
	Waikato
1985	New Zealand	0	0	0	0	0
1989	Auckland

Vaun Jon O'Callaghan is a New Zealand rugby league player who represented New Zealand in 1985.

== Playing career ==
O'Callaghan played for Huntly South in the Waikato Rugby League competition and was a Waikato representative. He was selected for the New Zealand national rugby league team in 1985. O'Callaghan however did not play in any Test matches for New Zealand.

In 1989 O'Callaghan played for the Otahuhu Leopards in the Auckland Rugby League competition and represented Auckland.
