= David Ewe =

New Zealand international rugby league footballer

Personal information
- Born: 15 November 1969 (age 56)

Playing information
- Position: Wing, Centre
Club
Years	Team	Pld	T	G	FG	P
1988–??	Upper Hutt Tigers
1994	Hutt Valley Firehawks	20	3	0	0	12
	Total	20	3	0	0	12
Representative
Years	Team	Pld	T	G	FG	P
1988–??	Wellington
1988–93	NZ Māori
1989	New Zealand	1	0	0	0	0

David Ewe is a New Zealand former professional rugby league footballer who represented New Zealand.

== Playing career ==
Ewe was a Wellington representative and played one match for the New Zealand national rugby league team in 1989 on a tour of Great Britain. He represented New Zealand Māori in the 1992 Pacific Cup and in 1993.

== Later years ==
In 2010 Ewe won the 50th Golden Shears pairs competition with Carl Cocks.
