= Logan Edwards =

New Zealand international rugby league footballer

Personal information
- Full name: Samuel Logan Edwards
- Born: 18 November 1968 (age 57) New Zealand

Playing information
- Height: 182 cm (6 ft 0 in)
- Weight: 85 kg (13 st 5 lb)
- Position: Centre, Second-row, Lock
Club
Years	Team	Pld	T	G	FG	P
	Marist-Western (CRL)
1988–90	Rochdale Hornets	28	16	0	0	64
1990–91	Swinton	28	13	0	0	52
1991–92	Oldham Bears	14	5	0	0	20
1994	Canterbury Cardinals	14	6	0	0	24
1995	Auckland Warriors	15	1	0	0	4
1996–97	Rochdale Hornets	22	8	0	2	34
	Total	121	49	0	2	198
Representative
Years	Team	Pld	T	G	FG	P
1988–94	Canterbury
1993–95	New Zealand	5	0	0	0	0

Samuel Logan Edwards (born 18 November 1968) is a New Zealand former rugby league footballer.

== Domestic career ==
Edwards played for the dominating Canterbury provincial side of the early 1990s alongside such talent as Quentin Pongia, Mike Dorreen, Whetu Taewa and coach Frank Endacott. This side continued its success as the Canterbury Cardinals in the 1994 Lion Red Cup. In 1993, he was selected for the New Zealand national rugby league team tour of Britain and France.

Edwards spent the New Zealand off-season in England, playing for the Rochdale Hornets from 1988/89 to 1989/90, then Swinton from 1989/90 to 1990/91. He then played for the Oldham Bears during the 1991/92 season.

== Auckland Warriors ==
In 1995, he joined the new Auckland Warriors franchise in the Australian Rugby League. He played fourteen matches for the latest club but was not re-signed for 1996. He also forced his way back into the Kiwis in 1995, being an unused substitution in the test against France and playing against Australia. Injury, however, stopped him from making the 1995 Rugby League World Cup squad.

He was to join the Hunter Mariners in 1996 however, a court ruling during the Super League war prevented the launch of the club until 1997.

== Post-playing career ==
In 2005 Edwards was named in the Canterbury Dream Team. In 2007 he was to coach the Canterbury under-18 side alongside Mike Doreen before the competition was cancelled by the New Zealand Rugby League. In 2009 he was the Canterbury Bulls under 18 assistant coach, under Doreen.
