= Dave Watson (rugby league) =

NZ international rugby league footballer

Personal information
- Full name: David Thomas Watson
- Born: 24 May 1966 (age 59); Taranaki, New Zealand

Playing information
- Position: Fullback, Centre, Stand-off
Club
Years	Team	Pld	T	G	FG	P
	Waitara Bears (TRL)
	Manukau Magpies
1988–89	Whitehaven	40	1	0	0	4
1989–90	York	12	1	0	0	4
1990–91	Hull Kingston Rovers	29	13	0	0	52
1991–92	Halifax	32	16	0	0	64
1992–95	Bradford Northern	62	21	0	0	84
1994	Cronulla-Sutherland	9	0	0	0	0
1995	Sydney Tigers	2	0	0	0	0
1996	Gold Coast	16	6	0	0	24
1997	South Qld Crushers	13	1	0	0	4
1998–99	Sheffield Eagles	51	4	0	0	16
2000	Workington Town	1	0	0	0	0
2001	Rochdale Hornets	30	10	0	0	40
	Total	297	73	0	0	292
Representative
Years	Team	Pld	T	G	FG	P
198?–93	Taranaki
198?–91	Auckland
1986–90	New Zealand Māori
1989–93	New Zealand	15	6	0	0	24

David Thomas Watson (born 24 May 1966) is a New Zealand former rugby league footballer who represented New Zealand in the 1980s and 1990s.

== Playing career ==
Watson began his career playing for the Waitara Bears in the Taranaki Rugby League before moving north and playing in the Auckland Rugby League competition. Watson joined the Manukau Magpies and in 1986 won the ARLs most improved back award.

In 1990 he signed with Hull Kingston Rovers for the 1990/91 season. He returned to England the next winter to play for the Halifax. In 1992 he began an association with Bradford Northern that lasted three seasons. Dave Watson played fullback in Bradford Northern's 15-8 defeat by Wigan in the 1992–93 Regal Trophy Final during the 1992–93 season at Elland Road, Leeds on Saturday 23 January 1993.

In 1993 Watson returned to Taranaki and played in the North Island Second Division. This made him eligible to participate in the Kiwi trials that year and he was selected for the series against Australia.

In 1994 Watson began playing in the Australian competition, spending time with the Cronulla-Sutherland Sharks, Sydney Tigers, Gold Coast Chargers and South Queensland Crushers.

In 1998 he returned to England, joining the Sheffield Eagles. In 1998 Watson, along with fellow 1989 Kiwi Whetu Taewa, Watson played stand-off in Sheffield Eagles' 17-8 victory over Wigan in the 1998 Challenge Cup Final during Super League III at Wembley Stadium, London on Saturday 2 May 1998.

== Representative career ==
Watson was a Taranaki and Auckland representative before being selected to represent New Zealand Māori in the 1986 Pacific Cup. He again represented the Māori against Great Britain in 1990.

Watson was selected for the New Zealand national rugby league team in 1989. He went on to make 15 appearances for the Kiwis, his last being in the 1993 test series against Australia.

== Legacy ==
In 2008 he was named in the Taranaki Rugby League Team of the Century.
