= Gerard Stokes =

New Zealand international rugby league footballer (1956–2020)

Personal information
- Full name: Gerard James Stokes
- Born: 3 March 1956 Christchurch, New Zealand
- Died: 8 December 2020 (aged 64) Christchurch, New Zealand

Playing information
- Position: Prop
Club
Years	Team	Pld	T	G	FG	P
	Marist-Western (CRL)
1982	Eastern Suburbs (CRL)
1982–83	Workington Town	22
1986–??	Marist-Western (CRL)
	Total	22	0	0	0	0
Representative
Years	Team	Pld	T	G	FG	P
1980–82	Canterbury
1982	South Island
1982	New Zealand	1	0	0	0	0

Coaching information
Club
Years	Team	Gms	W	D	L	W%
1988–??	Marist-Western
1994–96	Canterbury Country
1997–2002	Canterbury Bulls
2003	Wellington Orcas
2003–07	Workington Town
2008–10	Whitehaven
	Total	0	0	0	0
Representative
Years	Team	Gms	W	D	L	W%
2008–10	Serbia	9	4	0	5	44
- Relatives: Ben Stokes (son)

Gerard James Stokes (1956 – 8 December 2020) was a New Zealand rugby league footballer who played in the 1970s and 1980s, and coached in the 1980s through to the 2010s, who represented New Zealand. He was a coach of the Serbian national side. He was the father of English international cricketer Ben Stokes.

== Playing career ==
Stokes began playing rugby league early in life. In high school, he would sneak out of his boarding school in New Zealand every Saturday morning to play rugby league for Canterbury. He was a Schoolboy Kiwi in 1971 before later representing New Zealand in four non-Test matches on the 1982 tour of Australia and playing for Workington Town in 1982–83. In one match, Stokes dislocated his finger, and asked for an amputation in order to play again more quickly.

== Coaching career ==
In 1994, he was appointed coach of the new Canterbury Country Cardinals in the Lion Red Cup. The team made the finals in 1994, but finished tenth in 1995.

In 1996, he was appointed head coach of the Canterbury Rugby League representative side, facing irregular provincial competition. In 2000, he coached the Canterbury Bulls to a victory in the inaugural Bartercard Cup grand final. He was also named New Zealand coach of the year that season.

He applied to coach New Zealand in 2001 but was overlooked for Gary Freeman. Instead he was appointed Assistant Coach and a co-selector, working under Freeman, and in 2003 he was in charge of the New Zealand 'A' tour of Great Britain.

In 2002, Stokes moved north and coached the Wellington Franchise in the Bartercard Cup. He re-applied for the job at the end of the 2003 season but wanted too much money and so was not reappointed.

Instead, at the end of the New Zealand 'A' tour, he was offered the opportunity to stay in England and coach his old club, Workington Town. The club was in a state of disrepair and only seven players were contracted to the club. Stokes rebuilt the squad. However he was later fired by the club over an alleged disciplinary breach, despite being cleared by a RFL investigation. The club later agreed to a £14,000 pay-off days before a court case brought by Stokes was due to be heard.

In early 2008, he was offered the job of coaching Whitehaven, Workington Town's bitter local rivals, after coach Paul Crarey left the club citing personal health issues.

In late 2008, he travelled to Serbia and helped the national side prepare for the RLEF Euro Med Challenge. This move quickly proved beneficial to his club side as Whitehaven signed young Serbian national Soni Radovanović in January 2009. Stokes was dismissed in August 2010, after winning only 1 game in 14, with a disastrous record 13 game losing streak that ultimately led to Whitehaven's relegation from the Championship.

In 2013, he and wife Deb had moved from rugby league and back to Christchurch to a job working with young offenders; they were also involved in the restoration of Christchurch following the 2011 earthquake.

== Personal life ==
Stokes had two children from his first marriage, to Ferne Caldwell, and a son (England international cricket player Ben Stokes) with his second wife, Deb. In August 2020 Stokes revealed that he had been diagnosed with brain cancer in January 2020. He died at his home in Christchurch on 8 December 2020, aged 64.
