= Mike Dorreen =

New Zealand rugby league footballer and coach

Personal information
- Full name: Michael Dorreen
- Born: 19 January 1967 (age 59) New Zealand

Playing information
- Height: 182 cm (6 ft 0 in)
- Weight: 85 kg (13 st 5 lb)
- Position: Wing, Centre
Club
Years	Team	Pld	T	G	FG	P
	Addington (CRL)
1994	Hawkes Bay	20	11	0	0	44
1995	Auckland Warriors	4	2	0	0	8
1996	Sydney Tigers	10	3	0	0	12
1997	Hunter Mariners	4	1	0	0	4
	Total	38	17	0	0	68
Representative
Years	Team	Pld	T	G	FG	P
1988–93	Canterbury	43	30	0	0	120
1994	New Zealand	0	0	0	0	0

Michael Thomas Dorreen (born 19 January 1967) is a New Zealand former professional rugby league footballer who played in the 1980s and 1990s. He played at representative level for New Zealand and Canterbury, and at club level for Addington (of the Canterbury Rugby League), Hawkes Bay, Auckland Warriors, Sydney Tigers and Hunter Mariners, as a centre.

== New Zealand ==
Dorreen played for the dominating Canterbury provincial side of the early 1990s alongside Quentin Pongia, Logan Edwards, Whetu Taewa and coach Frank Endacott. In 1994, he changed regions and joined the Hawkes Bay Unicorns for the inaugural Lion Red Cup. He also made the New Zealand Residents side in 1994 and played two games for the New Zealand national rugby league team.

== Australian competition ==
In 1995, he joined the new Auckland Warriors franchise in the Australian Rugby League. He played in 14 matches for the new club but was not re-signed for 1996. In 1996, he moved to Sydney to play for the Sydney Tigers. He then finished his professional career with the Hunter Mariners in the Super League competition. He played for Orange in 1998.

He returned to New Zealand in 1999, playing for Halswell and Canterbury.

== Coaching career ==
In 2007, he was to coach the Canterbury under-18 side with his former teammate Logan Edwards before the competition was cancelled by the New Zealand Rugby League. However, they have continued to be involved in age grade coaching in Canterbury and, in 2009, they coached the Canterbury Bulls under-18 side.

In 2010, Dorreen coached the South Island under 17 side in the National Zonal Competition.

In 2012, he was promoted to head coach of the South Island side. In 2013, the Canterbury Bulls replaced the South Island Scorpions in the National Competition and Dorreen became the Canterbury Bulls' head coach.
