= Shane Endacott =

New Zealand rugby league footballer and coach

Personal information
- Born: 3 September 1971 (age 55) New Zealand

Playing information
- Position: Five-eighth
Club
Years	Team	Pld	T	G	FG	P
	Papanui (CRL)
	Sydenham (CRL)
1994	Canterbury Cardinals	12	3	0	0	12
1994–95	Hull FC	17	5	0	0	20
1995	Christchurch City	8	2	0	0	8
1997–99	Auckland Warriors	42	3	0	0	12
	Total	79	13	0	0	52
Representative
Years	Team	Pld	T	G	FG	P
1992–94	Canterbury
- Source: As of 27 November 2008
- Father: Frank Endacott

Shane Endacott (born 3 September 1971) is a New Zealand rugby league coach and former rugby league footballer. His position of preference was Five Eighth; however, he was also often used at lock, hooker or in the centres. He is the son of New Zealand national rugby league team coach Frank Endacott.

== Early years ==
Endacott was a Hornby junior in the Canterbury Rugby League competition, representing Papanui and Sydenham.

He played for the Canterbury Cardinals in the new Lion Red Cup in 1994.

During this time he studied at the University of Canterbury, gaining a Bachelor of Science degree.

== Playing career ==
Endacott moved to England in 1995, leaving the day after his final university exam, and joined Hull FC. His performances were impressive enough that the then Auckland Warriors signed him for the 1996 season. Before taking up his contract he played for the Christchurch City Shiners several times in the 1995 Lion Red Cup competition.

== Warriors ==
Endacott spent 1996 playing for the Warriors reserve grade team, which at the time was coached by his father, Frank. He was the reserve team's second highest tackler. He also was selected for a New Zealand XIII team that played the touring Great Britain side. In 1997 he finally made his first grade début for the Warriors, under coach John Monie. Midway through the season Monie was fired and his father, Frank, was promoted to coach the first grade side. Endacott continued to play for the Warriors, making 42 appearances until his retirement in 1999.

== Later years ==
After retirement Endacott remained in Auckland and became involved in the As Seen on TV business.

Endacott was assistant coach for the Celebration Lions Premiers in 2009, who won the Roller Doors Pre-season tournament and the Gore Cup.

In 2011 he accepted the role of head coach of the Halswell Hornets for 2011 and 2012 taking several key players from Celebration with him. He coached Canterbury A in the 2011 South Island competition. In 2012 he was promoted to coaching Canterbury following the retirement of Brent Stuart.
