= Mike Patton (rugby league) =

New Zealand international rugby league footballer

Personal information
- Full name: Michael Patrick Patton
- Born: 10 January 1966 (age 60) New Zealand

Playing information
- Position: Stand-off
Club
Years	Team	Pld	T	G	FG	P
19??–85	Mangere East Hawks
1986	Manukau Magpies
1987–??	Glenora Bears
	Total	0	0	0	0	0
Representative
Years	Team	Pld	T	G	FG	P
	Auckland
1990–91	New Zealand

Michael Patrick Patton is a New Zealand rugby league footballer who represented New Zealand in six Test matches, including matches that counted towards the 1992 World Cup.

== Playing career ==
Patton originally played for the Mangere East Hawks in the Auckland Rugby League competition and won the Lipscombe Cup in 1985 as the ARL's sportsman of the year. Patton spent the 1986 season with the Manukau Magpies. An Auckland representative, Patton again won the Lipscombe Cup in 1987, although by this time he was playing for the Glenora Bears.

He was called up into the New Zealand in 1990 and played in six Test matches, coming off the bench in all of them.

In 1992 he won the Rothville Trophy as the ARL player of the year.

== Later years ==
Patton went on to become a self-made millionaire.
