= Denvour Johnston =

Cook Islands & New Zealand international rugby league footballer

Personal information
- Full name: Denvour Francis Johnston

Playing information
- Position: Hooker
Club
| Years | Team | Pld | T | G | FG | P |
|---|---|---|---|---|---|---|
| | Randwick Kingfishers |
| 1994–95 | Hutt Valley Firehawks |
| 1996 | Taranaki Rockets |
| | Total | 0 | 0 | 0 | 0 | 0 |
Representative
| Years | Team | Pld | T | G | FG | P |
| 1992–97 | Wellington |
| 1988–92 | Cook Islands |
| 1993 | New Zealand | 2 | 0 | 0 | 0 | 0 |

Denvour Francis Johnston is a New Zealand rugby league footballer who represented New Zealand in 1993.

== Playing career ==
Johnston played for the Randwick Kingfishers club in the Wellington Rugby League competition. He represented the Cook Islands at the 1988 and 1992 Pacific Cups.

In 1993, after playing for Wellington in the 1993 National Provincial Competition, Johnston was named in the Possibles team that trialled for the New Zealand national rugby league team. Johnston was subsequently named in the Kiwis squad for the tour of Great Britain that year. He played in two test matches, replacing Duane Mann.

In 1994, with the launch of the Lion Red Cup, Johnston joined the Hutt Valley Firehawks. He remained with them for the three years of the competition and in 1996 was named in a New Zealand Residents team that played the touring Great Britain side.

In 1996 Johnston played for the Taranaki Rockets and then spent the off season in France. Johnston made 61 appearances in the Lion Red Cup for Taranaki and Hutt Valley.

In 1997 Johnston again played for Wellington and was part of the Upper Hutt Tigers side that won the Appleton Shield.
