= Russell Stewart (rugby league) =

New Zealand rugby league footballer and coach

Personal information
- Born: New Zealand

Playing information
Club
Years	Team	Pld	T	G	FG	P
	Ngongotaha
1987–90	Bradford Northern
1994	Bay of Plenty Stags	3	0	0	0	0
	Total	3	0	0	0	0
Representative
Years	Team	Pld	T	G	FG	P
1984–93	Bay of Plenty
1984–??	Northern Districts

Coaching information
Club
Years	Team	Gms	W	D	L	W%
1992	Ngongotaha
Representative
Years	Team	Gms	W	D	L	W%
1993	Bay of Plenty
- Source: RLP

Russell Stewart is a New Zealand rugby league footballer who played professionally for Bradford Northern in England.

== Playing career ==
Stewart is from the Ngongotaha Chiefs club and represented the Bay of Plenty.

He spent three seasons in England playing for Bradford Northern between 1987 and 1990.

Stewart played stand-off in the 11–2 victory over Castleford in the 1987 Yorkshire Cup Final replay during the 1987–88 season at Elland Road, Leeds on Saturday 31 October 1987.

He became the player-coach of the Ngongotaha Chiefs in 1992 and in 1993 he was the player-coach of Bay of Plenty in the National Provincial competition.
