= Aaron Whittaker =

New Zealand international rugby league footballer and referee

Personal information
- Full name: Aaron Mervyn Rutane Whittaker
- Born: 9 July 1968 (age 58) Christchurch, New Zealand

Playing information
- Height: 163 cm (5 ft 4 in)
- Weight: 80 kg (12 st 8 lb)
- Position: Halfback, Hooker
Club
Years	Team	Pld	T	G	FG	P
1989–91	Chorley Borough	40	13	0	1	53
1992	Illawarra Steelers	2	0	0	0	0
1994–95	Canterbury Cardinals	27	9	53	9	151
1994–95	Wakefield Trinity	25	7	13	1	55
1997–98	Auckland Warriors	8	1	1	1	7
	Total	102	30	67	12	266
Representative
Years	Team	Pld	T	G	FG	P
1990–99	Canterbury	17	13	0	0	52
1993–94	New Zealand	3	0	0	0	0
2001	South Island	1	0	0	0	0

Aaron Whittaker (born 9 July 1968) is a New Zealand former professional rugby league footballer. A New Zealand international representative halfback, he played club football in Australia, England and New Zealand.

== Early years ==
Whittaker grew up in Christchurch and was a Schoolboy Kiwi in 1983 before becoming part of the dominant Canterbury rugby league side of the early nineties. The side was coached by Frank Endacott and included future stars such as Whetu Taewa, Quentin Pongia and Brent Stuart. In Christchurch he played for two clubs: the Halswell Hornets and the Riccarton Knights.

His form was impressive enough to land a contract in the NSWRL Premiership, signing with the Illawarra Steelers in 1992. Whittaker played in three games for the club, including a try-scoring effort against the Great Britain touring side, returning to New Zealand at the end of the year.

In 1993, Whittaker was selected for the New Zealand national rugby league team. He went on to play thirteen games for the national side, although only three were test matches. During this time, he trained with Gary Freeman and Daryl Halligan and this allowed him to improve his halfback and goal kicking skills. In 1994, he was part of the Kiwis tour of Papua New Guinea. Between 1990 and 1994, he played in 17 games for Canterbury, scoring thirteen tries.

== England ==
In 1994, he played for the Canterbury Cardinals in the new Lion Red Cup and at the half way stage was the competition's leading points scorer. As a result, he began to attract interest from overseas clubs and agreed to a mid-season transfer, joining Wakefield Trinity. He returned to the Cardinals in the English offseason and played in part of the 1995 Lion Red Cup.

== Return to New Zealand ==
After a spell in England, he returned to New Zealand, signing for the Auckland Warriors. He played nine games for the Warriors in the 1997 and 1998 seasons

After being released by the Warriors, he returned to local football in Canterbury, playing for his old side the Haswell Hornets. In 2001, he was involved in the South Island team that played the touring French side.

== Later years ==
In 2002, he was named the head trainer for the New Zealand 'A' sides tour of France and the United States, a position he retained for the sides 2003 tour of Australia, where he worked under former teammate Terry Hermansson.

He is now involved with the Currumbin Eagles JRL as a coach where he has steered numerous teams to finals contention. He also is involved with the Gold Coast Rugby League as a referee.
