= Robert Piva =

New Zealand international rugby league footballer

Personal information
- Born: 4 November 1966 (age 58)

Playing information
- Height: 208 cm (6 ft 10 in)
- Weight: 122 kg (19 st 3 lb)
- Position: Prop, Second-row
Club
Years	Team	Pld	T	G	FG	P
1985–87	St. George (WRL)
1988–90	Randwick (WRL)
1991–93	Porirua City (WRL)
1994	Taranaki Rockets	14	4	0	0	16
1994–95	Wakefield Trinity	18	3	0	0	12
1995	North Qld Cowboys	9	0	0	0	0
	Total	41	7	0	0	28
Representative
Years	Team	Pld	T	G	FG	P
1986–93	Wellington	40	0	0	0	0
1993	New Zealand	1	0	0	0	0

Robert Piva (born 4 November 1966 Died 24 March 2025) is a former New Zealand international rugby league footballer who played in the 1980s and 1990s. A prop forward, Piva played for Wakefield Trinity and was a foundation player for the North Queensland Cowboys.

== Playing career ==
A Junior Kiwis representative, Piva played for Waterside, St. George, Randwick, Porirua City and the Kapiti Bears in the Wellington Rugby League and represented Wellington 40 times over seven years.

In 1993, he was selected for New Zealand on their tour of Great Britain. He made his Test debut for New Zealand in their 24–19 win over Wales in Swansea. He played eight tour games before fracturing his eye socket while tackling Andy Farrell in a game against the Great Britain under-21 side.

In 1994, Piva played for the Taranaki Rockets in the Lion Red Cup. Halfway through the season he was signed by Wakefield Trinity, spending a season with the club.

In 1995, after the English season had ended, he signed with the North Queensland Cowboys in the Australian Rugby League. In Round 11 of the 1995 ARL season, he made his first grade in the Cowboys' 14–44 loss to the Newcastle Knights. He played nine games for the club that season, coming off the bench in all of them. At the end of the season, he was named in the Western Samoa squad for 1995 Rugby League World Cup but did not play a game.

In 1996, he represented Western Samoa at the Super League World Nines in Suva, Fiji.

In 2001 he played in the Bartercard Cup for the Porirua Pumas.
