= Blair Harding =

New Zealand international rugby league footballer

Personal information
- Full name: Blair Edward Harding
- Born: 12 October 1970 Auckland, New Zealand
- Died: 11 January 2004 (aged 33) Christchurch, New Zealand

Playing information
- Position: Centre, Stand-off
Club
Years	Team	Pld	T	G	FG	P
19??	Hornby
19??–98	Papanui Tigers
1994	Canterbury Country
1995	Christchurch City	9	4	0	0	16
1996	Canterbury Country	19	9	2	0	40
	Total	28	13	2	0	56
Representative
Years	Team	Pld	T	G	FG	P
1993–97	Canterbury
199?	New Zealand Māori
1993	New Zealand

Blair Edward Harding was a New Zealand rugby league player who represented New Zealand in 1993.

== Playing career ==
Harding played for Papanui in the Canterbury Rugby League competition. He played for Canterbury in 1993, being part of the side that defeated Auckland to win the National Provincial Competition. Harding was then selected by Howie Tamati to be part of the New Zealand national rugby league team squad that toured Great Britain and France that year.

In 1994 Papanui won the Canterbury Rugby League's Pat Smith Challenge Trophy. Harding also played for the Canterbury Country Cardinals in the new Lion Red Cup competition.

In 1995 Harding moved across town to join the Christchurch City Shiners, Canterbury's other Lion Red Cup team. He also played for the New Zealand Māori side.

Harding continued to represent Canterbury until 1997. He played for the Papanui Tigers during the 1998 season.

== Death ==
Harding died on 11 January 2004, in Christchurch aged 33.
