= New Zealand Residents rugby league team =

New Zealand Residents
Team information
- Governing body: New Zealand Rugby League
- Head coach: Rod Ratu

The New Zealand Residents (also previously known as New Zealand 'A', New Zealand XIII, the Lion Red Cup XIII and currently known as the Bartercard Premiership Selection) are a New Zealand rugby league football representative side that is selected from players competing on teams based in New Zealand, as compared to expat Kiwis competing with clubs based in other countries.

== History ==
In 1977, Dane Sorensen became the first New Zealander to be selected for the New Zealand national rugby league team while based overseas (Australia). Before this date all New Zealand national sides were made up entirely of residents. In 1993, New Zealand fielded its first ever national team made up entirely of overseas based players. Since 1993, with the exception of a few players from the Auckland/New Zealand Warriors team competing in the Australian National Rugby League, the New Zealand national team is predominantly filled with expat Kiwis.

In 1994, then Kiwi coach Frank Endacott led a New Zealand Residents side on a tour of Australia.

In 1996 New Zealand XIII participated in the Pacific Challenge and, as the Lion Red Cup XIII, drew in a match against the touring Great Britain side and defeated the touring Papua New Guinea side.

New Zealand XIII competed in the 1997 Oceania Cup, defeating New Zealand Māori in the final. In 1998 a Residents XIII lost two matches to the Auckland Warriors.

New Zealand 'A', coached by Gary Kemble, toured the United States and France in 2002 and, led by Ged Stokes, Great Britain in 2003. These two touring sides featured many players who would go on to have professional careers, including George Carmont, David Fa'alogo, Fuifui Moimoi, Tevita Latu, Phillip Leuluai and Hutch Maiava.

Since then team has reverted to being known as the New Zealand Residents, with a New Zealand 'A' taking the field in 2006 made up of overseas based professional players.

In 2006 the New Zealand Residents, coached by David Lomax, competed in a Trans Tasman Quadrangular Series against the Queensland Residents, New South Wales Country and a Jim Beam Cup selection. The Residents won this series. The Residents then played the New Zealand national rugby league team in a warm up match for the 2006 Tri-Nations. The senior side won 34-4.

The Residents have also competed in the World Sevens.

2016- NZ RESIDENTS VS MAORI XIII - Game played at Davies Park, Huntly, NZ 15/10/2016

FINAL SCORE - NZ Residents Win 30-10

2017- NZ RESIDENTS VS MAORI XIII - Game played at Pullman Park, Auckland, NZ 14/10/2017

FINAL SCORE - NZ Maori Win 22-16

== 2017 selection ==
The Residents side played a New Zealand Māori XIII on 14 October 2017. The Residents were coached by Rod Ratu assistant coach Andrew Auimatagi, trainer Jason McCarthy and manager Alana Lockhorst and include; Uila Aiolupo, Jethro Friend, Roman Hifo, Paulos Latu, Alan Niulevu, Raymond Talimalie, Taylor Bear (Counties Manukau Stingrays), Tevin Arona, Chris Bamford, James Baxendale, Phil Nati, Nathan Saumalu, Matthew Sauni (Canterbury Bulls), Siua Otunuku, Daniel Palavi, Cole Waaka (Air Force & NZDF), Tevita Satae (Akarana Falcons) and Nick Read (Waikato).

== Jerseys ==
The 2009 Bartercard Premiership Selection jersey
