= Frank Endacott =

NZ RL coach and former rugby league footballer

Personal information
- Full name: Frank Morris Endacott

Playing information
- Position: Stand-off
Club
Years	Team	Pld	T	G	FG	P
19??	Addington (CRL)
19??–87	Hornby (CRL)
	Total	0	0	0	0	0

Coaching information
Club
Years	Team	Gms	W	D	L	W%
1997–98	Auckland Warriors	42	16	0	26	38
1999–01	Wigan Warriors	31	25	1	5	81
2004–05	Widnes Vikings	29	7	1	21	24
	Total	102	48	2	52	47
Representative
Years	Team	Gms	W	D	L	W%
1989–93	Canterbury
1995–00	New Zealand	13	4	0	9	31
- Source: As of 24 February 2009
- Relatives: Shane Endacott (son)

Frank Morris Endacott ONZM, also known by the nickname of "Happy Frank", is a New Zealand former professional rugby league footballer, and coach.

== Background ==
His son, Shane, also played rugby league.

== Playing career ==
Endacott began as a junior at the Shirley Hawks, and later played for Addington and Hornby in the Canterbury Rugby League competition. He made the Junior Kiwis in 1963, but after marrying and having a family of four sons decided not to take his rugby league playing career any further.

== Coaching in New Zealand ==
Endacott started coaching Canterbury provincial sides in New Zealand before becoming involved with the Auckland Warriors, coaching the reserve side in the club's debut year in 1995. He continued with this role until John Monie was sacked as head coach halfway through the 1997 Super League season. He was the head coach of the Warriors for the rest of 1997 and the 1998 season, leaving after being dumped by the club's new owners prior to the 1999 season.

While coaching Canterbury he was twice named Canterbury Coach of the Year by The Sir Richard Hadlee Sports Trust.

== Coaching in England ==
Endacott joined the Wigan Warriors after the 1999 season, initially only on a one-year contract. In 2000 he was named Super League's Coach of the Year. Endacott took the Wigan Warriors to the 2000 Super League Grand Final but lost against St. Helens. He went on to coach the club until 2001. He won the Minor Premiership in 2000 and made the Grand Final but was sacked after a string of bad results in the 2001 season. However club chairman Maurice Lindsay said that Endacott had left the club in a better state than he'd found it.

In August 2004 Endacott put his player management business on hold to act as an advisor to the Widnes Vikings. He helped the Widnes Vikings to avoid relegation at the end of the season and was subsequently appointed as head coach for the 2005 Season. He left at the end of the 2005 season after the Widnes Vikings were relegated from the Super League.

== International ==
While coaching in Canterbury, Endacott led tours of both the Junior Kiwis and New Zealand Residents.

Endacott was appointed as head coach of the New Zealand national rugby league team in 1994 and continued in this role until the end of the 2000 season. His spell as head coach included two World Cups, in 1995 and 2000.

In 2008 Endacott was involved in his third World Cup, coaching the New Zealand Police team in the inaugural Police World Cup. The team lost the final 20–12.

== Player Agent & Later life ==
Endacott is a well known player agent and, alongside his business partner Peter Brown, manages many professional rugby league players.

In 2002, his biography Being Frank was published.

In December 2006 Endacott was made an Officer of the New Zealand Order of Merit, as part of the New Year Honours 2007.
