= Whetu Taewa =

NZ international rugby league footballer

Personal information
- Born: 19 October 1970 (age 55) West Coast, New Zealand

Playing information
- Height: 176 cm (5 ft 9 in)
- Weight: 89 kg (14 st 0 lb)
- Position: Wing, Centre
Club
| Years | Team | Pld | T | G | FG | P |
|---|---|---|---|---|---|---|
| 19?? | Suburbs (WCRL) |
| 1989–93 | Halswell (CRL) |
| 1994 | Counties Manukau | 23 | 16 | 0 | 0 | 64 |
| 1995 | Auckland Warriors | 11 | 1 | 0 | 0 | 4 |
| 1996 | North Qld Cowboys | 12 | 2 | 0 | 0 | 8 |
| 1997–98 | Sheffield Eagles | 53 | 12 | 0 | 0 | 48 |
| 1999–02 | Hull Kingston Rovers | 131 | 59 | 0 | 0 | 236 |
| | Total | 230 | 90 | 0 | 0 | 360 |
Representative
| Years | Team | Pld | T | G | FG | P |
| 1988 | West Coast | 4 |
| 1989–96 | New Zealand | 6 | 1 | 0 | 0 | 4 |
| 1989–93 | Canterbury | 37 |
| 1994 | Auckland | 1 | 0 | 0 | 0 | 0 |
| 1992–96 | New Zealand Māori | 2 |

Whetu Taewa (born 19 October 1970) is a New Zealand former professional rugby league footballer who represented New Zealand six times between 1989 and 1996.

== Playing career ==
=== New Zealand ===
Whetu was born on the West Coast, New Zealand and started playing rugby league there; all grades up to the West Coast Representative side. In 1987 he made the New Zealand under 17's training squad and also débuted in the West Coast rugby union side. Taewa made the Junior Kiwis in 1988. In 1989 he moved to Christchurch and played for the Hallswell club. This was the year he first made the New Zealand national rugby league team, joining their tour to Great Britain. From 1990 to 1993 he was part of the successful Canterbury side of the era and again joined the Kiwis on the 1993 tour of Great Britain and France. He played 4 games for the West Coast and 37 games for Canterbury. He played in the 1992 Pacific Cup for the New Zealand Māori side. In 1993 he was invited to be part of an Auckland Invitational XIII side that drew 16-all with the Balmain Tigers.

In 1996 he played in the GB lions tour of New Zealand playing for the New Zealand Maori at centre coming up with a brilliant 40 points to 28 victory. It was the Māoris best win in over 15 years.

=== Australian Rugby League ===
In 1994 he signed with the Auckland Warriors who were to be a new team in the Australian Rugby League premiership. He moved up to Auckland and played for the Counties Manukau Heroes in the Lion Red Cup that year and represented Auckland in their Rugby League Cup challenge. In 1995 he was in the inaugural run on side for the Warriors in their first match against the Brisbane Broncos. However, in 1996 he was released from the club and he joined the North Queensland Cowboys. Taewa toured PNG in 1996 with the New Zealand Māori.

=== England ===
In 1997 he joined the Sheffield Eagles in the Super League competition. Taewa played centre in Sheffield Eagles' 17–8 victory over Wigan in the 1998 Challenge Cup Final during Super League III at Wembley Stadium, London on Saturday 2 May 1998.

In 1999 he joined Hull Kingston Rovers who played in the Northern Ford Premiership, the division below the Super League. He became the captain in 2000, before retiring at the end of the 2002 season.

== Coaching and later years ==
In 2003 he was an assistant coach for Hull Kingston Rovers before he returned home to New Zealand. Taewa left Hull KR after a family friend fell ill in New Zealand. He now resides in Cromwell.

== Honours ==
As Taewa represented the New Zealand national rugby league team while playing for the Haswell club, he was rewarded with Honorary life membership at the club.
