= 2010 in rugby league =

Top-level rugby league in 2010 centered on Australasia's 2010 NRL season and Super League XV. High-profile representative competitions included the 2010 Four Nations (held in Australia and New Zealand), the 2010 State of Origin series and the 2010 European Cup.

== January ==
- 29 – Wrexham, Wales: Super League XV kicks off with a match between champions Leeds Rhinos and Crusaders at the Racecourse Ground before a crowd of 10,334

== February ==
- 4 – Leicester, England: Dual-code rugby international Lote Tuqiri signs with the National Rugby League's Wests Tigers club
- 13 – Gold Coast, Australia: The Inaugural NRL All Stars match is won by the Indigenous All Stars team who beat the NRL All Stars 16–12 before a crowd of 26,687 at Skilled Park
- 28 – Leeds, England: The 2010 World Club Challenge is won by the Melbourne Storm, who defeated the Leeds Rhinos 18–10 at Elland Road before a crowd of 27,697. This title is later stripped from the Storm due to salary cap breaches exposed two months later, although this title would not be officially revoked until May 2011.

== March ==
- 5 – Wrexham, Wales: Welsh Super League club Crusaders ends days of speculation when they announce the signing of 35-year-old Gareth Thomas, the most-capped Welsh rugby union player of all time
- 12 – Australia: The 2010 NRL season kicks off with St George Illawarra Dragons taking on Parramatta Eels at Parramatta Stadium in Sydney, and also the Brisbane Broncos taking on the North Queensland Cowboys at Suncorp Stadium in Brisbane

== April ==
- 22 – Sydney, Australia: NRL Premiers Melbourne Storm are stripped of their 2007 and 2009 Premierships and 2006–2008 minor Premierships, ordered to return fines and prize-money totalling $1.689 million, deducted all eight Premiership points for the 2010 season and barred from receiving Premiership points for the rest of the season by the National Rugby League after being found guilty of long-term gross salary cap breaches

== May ==
- 7 – Melbourne, Australia: The opening of the newly constructed AAMI Park saw Australia defeat New Zealand 12–8 in the 2010 ANZAC Test
- 7 – Port Macquarie, Australia: In the annual New South Wales City vs Country Origin match, Country defeat City 36–18 before a crowd of 7,688
- 26 – Sydney, Australia: Game I of the 2010 State of Origin series becomes the world's first free-to-air live 3D TV broadcast.

== June ==
- 1 – Sydney, Australia: After months of media speculation Israel Folau announces that he has signed to play Australian rules football in the Australian Football League from 2011
- 4 – Malta defeats Norway 30–20 in the Rugby League European Bowl
- 12 – Leigh, England: In a one-off test England defeat France 60–6 at Leigh Sports Village before a crowd of 7,951
- 13 – Barcelona, Spain: Barcelona University defeat CR Sant Cugat 44–18 in the Catalan Rugby League Championship
- 16 – Brisbane, Australia: The 2010 State of Origin series is won by Queensland who defeated New South Wales 34–6 in Game II at Lang Park before a crowd of 54,452

== July ==
- 17 July – Serbia win the Western European Shield

== August ==
- 20 August – London, England: The 2010 Challenge Cup tournament culminates in Warrington Wolves' 30 – 6 win against Leeds Rhinos in the final at Wembley Stadium before 85,217.
- 22 August – Auckland, New Zealand: The Mt Albert Lions defeated the Otahuhu Leopards in the Auckland Fox Memorial competition
- 28 August – Philadelphia, US: The 2010 AMNRL season culminates in the Jacksonville Axemen (United States) 34–14 win against New Haven Warriors in the championship match.

== September ==
- 7th – Sydney: The 2010 Dally M Awards are held and Todd Carney (Australia) is named NRL player of the year.
- 11th – Darwin, Australia: The Brothers Rugby League club defeated Nightcliff Dragons in the Darwin Rugby League grand final
- 13th – Perth, Australia: The Western Australia Rugby League grand final is won by South Perth Lions 22–18 against the North Beach Sea Eagles
- 18th – Russia win the Eastern European Shield
- 19th – Newcastle, New South Wales: The Newcastle Rugby League grand final is won by the Maitland Pickers defeating Cessnock Goannas 24–8
- 19th – Brisbane, Australia: The 2010 Queensland Cup season culminates in the Northern Pride' 30–20 win against the Norths Devils in the grand final.
- 23rd – Sydney, Australia: The 12th annual Tom Brock Lecture, entitled Tries and Tribulations is delivered by John Fahey, AC.
- 26th – Cheshire, England: The 2010 Rugby League Conference culminates in Warrington Wizards 23–18 grand final win against Huddersfield Rangers
- 26th – Cheshire, England: The 2010 Co-operative Championship culminates in Halifax 23–22 grand final win against Featherstone Rovers
- 27th - Manchester, England: The 2010 Man of Steel Award is won by Wigan's goal-kicking winger, Pat Richards.

== October ==
- 2 – Manchester, England: Super League XV culminates in minor premiers Wigan Warriors' 26–6 grand final win against St. Helens in front of 71,526
- 3 – Sydney: The New South Wales Rugby League culminates with the Canterbury Bankstown Bulldogs 24–12 grand final win against the Windsor Wolves
- 3 – Sydney: The National Youth Competition culminates with the New Zealand Warriors 42–28 grand final win against the South Sydney Rabbitohs
- 3 – Sydney: The 2010 NRL season culminates in the minor premiers St George Illawarra Dragons's (Australia) 32–8 grand final win against the Sydney Roosters in front of 82,334
- 16 – Auckland, New Zealand: In an international rugby league double-header at Mt Smart Stadium before a crowd of 11,512, England played a NZ Maori side, resulting in an 18–18 draw before Samoa played their first ever test match against New Zealand, which the Kiwis won 50–6
- 17 – Auckland, New Zealand: Auckland Premier defeated Counties Manukau 14–6 in the National Zonal Competition Albert Baskerville Trophy grand final
- 24 – Albi, France: Wales defeated France 12–11 to win the 2010 European Cup and qualify for promotion to the 2011 Rugby League Four Nations

== November ==
- 13 November – Brisbane, Australia: The 2010 Rugby League Four Nations tournament culminates in New Zealand's 16–14 win over Australia in the final at Suncorp Stadium before a crowd of 36,317
- 20 November – Jacksonville, US: United States defeated Canada 46–12 to win the 2010 Atlantic Cup

== December ==
- 3 December – Benji Marshall won the 2010 Rugby League World Golden Boot Award
- 3 December – The 2010 World XIII was announced, featuring James Graham (St Helens), Cameron Smith (Melbourne), David Shillington (Canberra), Sam Thaiday (Brisbane), Sam Burgess (South Sydney), Paul Gallen (Cronulla), Billy Slater (Melbourne), Jason Nightingale (St George-Illawarra) Shaun Kenny-Dowall (Roosters), Brent Tate (Warriors), Manu Vatuvei (Warriors), Benji Marshall (Wests Tigers) and Nathan Fien (St George-Illawarra)
- 14 December – The major parties that comprised the National Rugby League – New South Wales Rugby League, Queensland Rugby League and News Limited – formally accepted a new constitution to dismantle the existing NRL board and create a new independent governing body tentatively known as the Australian Rugby League Commission.

== Other results ==
Other international fixture results include: 16 October New Zealand 50 – Samoa 6 (Test Match) 16 October NZ Maori 18 – England 18 October 10 Scotland 22 – Wales 60 (European Cup) 9 October France 58 – Ireland 24 (European Cup) 6 October Wales 6 – Italy 15 October 3 England 18 – Cumbria 18 September 26 Papua New Guinea PM XIII 18 – Australian PM XIII 30 September 26 Italy 24 – Lebanon 16 September 24 Italy 8 – Lebanon 16 September 19 United States 20 – Canada 16 (Colonial Cup) 18 September Ukraine 112 – Latvia 0 (European Shield) 31 July Russia 54 – Latvia 4 (European Shield) 28 July South Africa Students 0 – GB Community Lions 70 July 24 South Africa A 22 – GB Community Lions 42 July 17 Germany 96 – Czech Republic 0 (European Shield) 3 July Almaty Academy 2 – GB Pioneers 60 (Pioneers Tour) 3 July Serbia 40 – Germany 14 (European Shield) 27 June Russia 52 – Ukraine 14 (European Shield) 26 June Czech Republic 4 – Serbia 56 (European Shield) 12 June England 60 – France 6 (Test Match) 6 June BARLA Young Lions 44 – South Africa Under 21s 30 June 4 Malta 30 – Norway XIII 20 (European Bowl) 4 June BARLA under 23's 46 – Ukraine Students 12 June 2 BARLA Young Lions 24 – South Africa Presidents 22 May 29 BARLA Young Lions 78 – South Africa Schools 0 May 26 BARLA Young Lions 76 – South Africa Junior Development 0 May 22 BARLA U19's 50 – South Africa 18 May 7 Australia 12 – New Zealand 8 (Anzac Test)

== 2010 Champions ==
Domestic Champions
Tournament	Year	Current Holder
National Rugby League	2010	St George Illawarra Dragons
Super League	2010	Wigan Warriors
Challenge Cup	2010	Warrington Wolves
World Club Challenge	2010	Melbourne Storm
Le Championnat de France Elite	2010	Lézignan Sangliers
Lord Derby Cup	2010	Lézignan Sangliers
National Zonal Competition	2010	Auckland Premier
Welsh Conference	2010	Neath Port Talbot Steelers
American National Rugby League	2010	Jacksonville Axemen
Bemobile Cup	2010	Goroka Lahanis
All Ireland	2010	Treaty City Titans
Leinster League	2010	Dublin City Exiles
Scotland Conference	2010	Carluke Tigers
Lebanon Championship	2010	LAU Immortals
Fiji NRL	2010	Sabeto Roosters
Tonga National Rugby League	2010	Lapaha Knights
Samoan Championship	2010	Marist Saints
Tom van Vollenhoven Cup	2010	Wildcats
Catalan Championship	2010	Barcelona U.C.
Catalan University Championship	2010	University Girona
Italian Championship	2010	Gladiators Roma
Jamaica Championship	2010	Vauxhall Vultures
Jamaica University	2010	GC Foster College
Czech Republic League	2010	Beroun
Rugby League Deutschland	2010	Rheinland
Netherland Grand Prix	2010	Capelle
Serbian Championship	2010	RK Dorćol
Serbian Cup	2010	RK Dorćol
Ukraine Championship	2009	Legion XIII
Norway Championship	2010	Oslo RK
Cook Islands League	2010	Avatiu Eels
National Youth Competition	2010	New Zealand Warriors
Queensland Cup	2010	Northern Pride
NSW Cup	2010	Bankstown City
Co-operative Championship	2010	Halifax
Championship One	2010	Hunslet Hawks
Northern Rail Cup	2010	Batley Bulldogs

International Champions
Tournament	Year	Current Holder
Four Nations	2010	New Zealand
European Cup	2010	Wales
Atlantic Cup	2010	United States
ANZAC Cup	2010	Australia
European Shield – Western	2010	Serbia
European Shield – Eastern	2010	Russia
European Bowl	2010	Malta
Slavic Cup	2010	Serbia
Representative Champions
Tournament	Year	Current Holder
NRL All Stars	2010	Indigenous All Stars
State of Origin	2010	Queensland
City vs Country Origin	2010	Country
PNG Origin	2010	PNG Internationals
Ireland Provincial	2010	Munster
Fiji Origin	2010	Western
Lebanon Origin	2010	Liban Espoir
Serbian Origin	2010	Belgrade City
Czech Republic Origin	2010	Moravia
