= 2010 New Zealand rugby league season =

Seasons
- 2009 2011

The New Zealand rugby league season 2010 was the 103rd season of rugby league that was played in New Zealand. The main feature of the year was the new National Zonal competition run by the New Zealand Rugby League. The premier teams competed for the Albert Baskerville Trophy, which was won by Auckland when they defeated Counties Manukau 14 - 6 in the Grand Final.

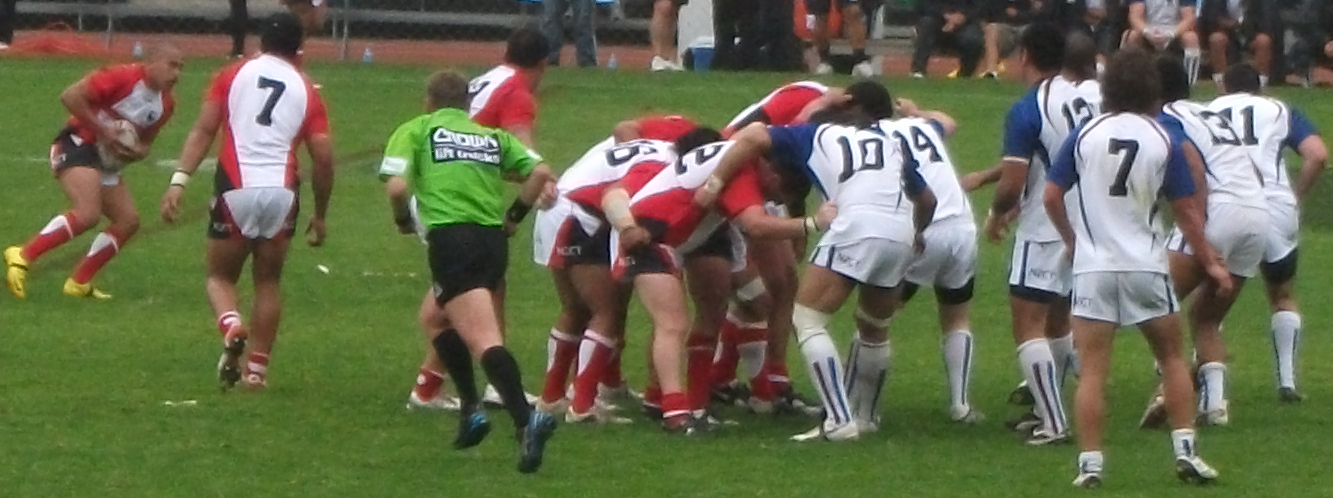
Auckland v Counties Manukau in the Albert Baskerville Trophy final

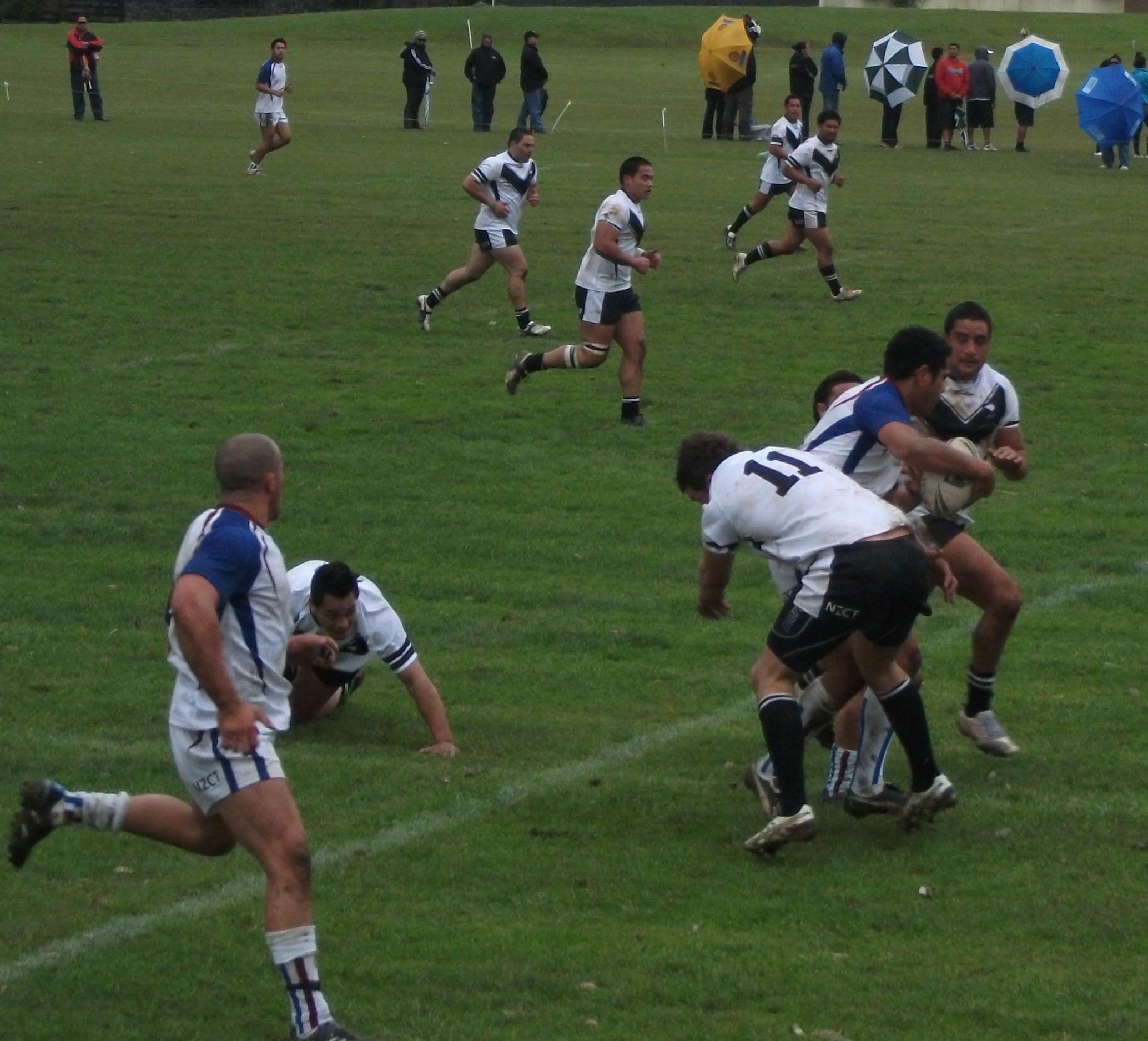
Auckland v South Island in an Albert Baskerville Trophy match

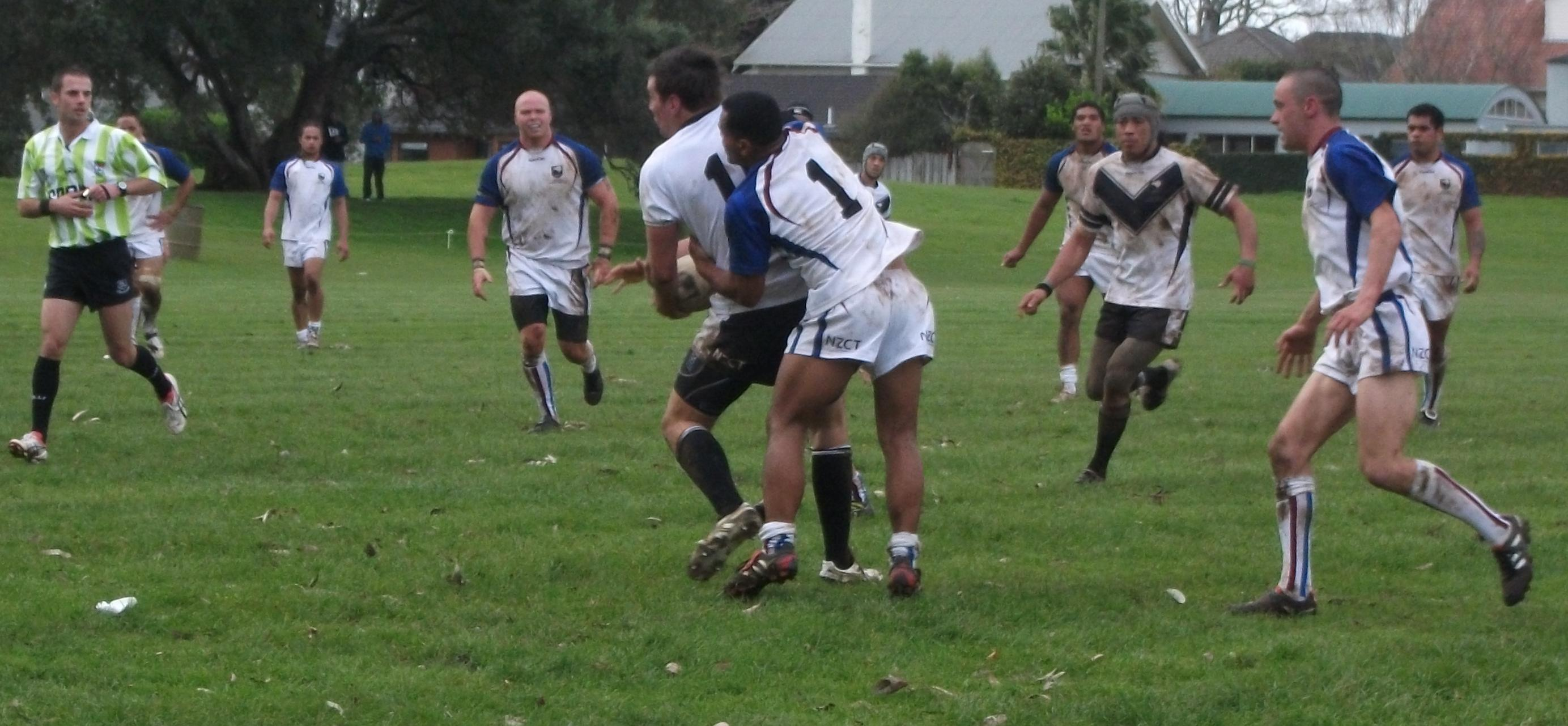
Auckland v South Island in an Albert Baskerville Trophy match

== International competitions ==
Five test matches took place in New Zealand in 2010. First New Zealand hosted Samoa in a warm up match to the 2010 Four Nations, defeating them 50–6. It was the first time the two nations had played each other in a test match. As part of the Four Nations competition New Zealand played England, Australia and Papua New Guinea in Wellington, Auckland and Rotorua respectively. England and PNG also play each other as a curtain raiser to the New Zealand vs Australia match. The match against England celebrated a centenary of international rugby league in New Zealand and the English and Kiwis both wore 1910 style jerseys to mark the occasion. New Zealand went on to win the tournament, defeating Australia 16 - 12 in the final at Suncorp Stadium.

Coached by Stephen Kearney, the team consisted of: Antonio Winterstein, Bronson Harrison, Greg Eastwood, Adam Blair, Sika Manu, Junior Sa'u, Fuifui Moimoi, Frank Pritchard, Nathan Fien, Jason Nightingale, Jeremy Smith, Issac Luke, Shaun Kenny-Dowall, Frank-Paul Nuuausala, Sam Perrett, Jared Waerea-Hargreaves, Lewis Brown, Lance Hohaia, Simon Mannering, Ben Matulino, Manu Vatuvei, Benji Marshall (C) and Thomas Leuluai.

The Samoan side featured seven former New Zealand internationals, Tony Puletua, Francis Meli, Ali Lauitiiti, David Faiumu, David Solomona, Harrison Hansen and Ben Roberts.

Earlier in the year New Zealand lost 8–12 to Australia. Aaron Heremaia, Zeb Taia and Steve Matai played in this match but did not make the Four Nations squad.

The Junior Kiwis, originally scheduled to play two matches against the England youth side, instead hosted the Junior Kangaroos in two curtain raisers to Four Nations matches. The team was coached by David Kidwell and included: Pakisonasi Afu, Martin Taupau (C), Glen Fisiiahi, Sebastine Ikahihifo, Mark Ioane, Shaun Johnson, Siuatonga Likiliki, Sam Lousi, Nafe Seluini, Carlos Tuimavave, Bill Tupou, Drury Low, Matthew McIlwrick, Sam Mataora, Isaac Maliota, Kane Morgan, Lama Tasi, Dean Whare and Jason Taumalolo. They lost to Australia 16–24 but won the second match 32–20 after trailing 0–20 at halftime.

The New Zealand Māori rugby league team played England in a curtain raiser to the New Zealand v Samoa test match. After trailing 18–0 the Māori came back to draw the match 18-all. The team was coached by Richie Blackmore and Mark Horo and consisted of: Kevin Locke, Sandor Earl, Timana Tahu, Clinton Toopi, Arana Taumata, Rangi Chase, Jeremy Smith, Willie Heta, Aaron Heremaia, Weller Hauraki, Justin Horo, Bodene Thompson, Kevin Proctor, James Tamou, Sam McKendry and Russell Packer.

The Kiwi Ferns played two matches against their English counterparts, winning the series 2–0.

A New Zealand Residents team was expected to compete in an end-of-season international fixture, but the team pulled out at the last minute. The Residents still assembled and took part in an opposed training session with the New Zealand Kiwis. The team was co-coached by Ken McIntosh and Brent Stuart and included James Blackwell (Counties Manukau), Junior Salevao (South Island), Shaun Metcalf (Auckland), Matt Wanoa (Wellington), Bureta Faraimo (Wellington), Matt Everitt (Wellington), Trent Wallace (Auckland), Karl Edmondson (Auckland), Darin Kingi (Counties Manukau), Jaye Pukepuke (South Island), Alfred Penese (Wellington), Tane Hart (Auckland), Saulala Houma (Auckland). Bench: Suaia Matagi (Auckland), George Mafi (Wellington), Hemi Kemp (Wellington) and Pauly Tuuta (Heartland).

At the New Zealand Rugby League awards Shaun Kenny-Dowall was named the International Player of the Year while Lewis Brown won the International Rookie award. Shane Rehm was the Referee of the year, Saulala Houma won the Domestic award and Matt Duffie won the Junior player of the year. Nathan Cayless was given a special recognition award. Benji Marshall later won the World Golden Boot Award as best international player while Shaun Kenny-Dowall finished second in the voting and was named at centre in the international team of the year. At the Maori Sports Awards Stephen Kearney won Coach of the Year while Henry Perenara won the umpire/referee award. Richie Blackmore won the Coach of the Year award at the Counties Manukau Sporting Excellence Awards while the Counties Manukau under 17 side, coached by Blackmore, won the Junior sportsteam award.

== National competitions ==
=== Rugby League Cup ===
Canterbury currently holds the Rugby League Cup, having won it from Auckland in 2009. The Cup was not defended in 2010.

=== National Zonal competition ===
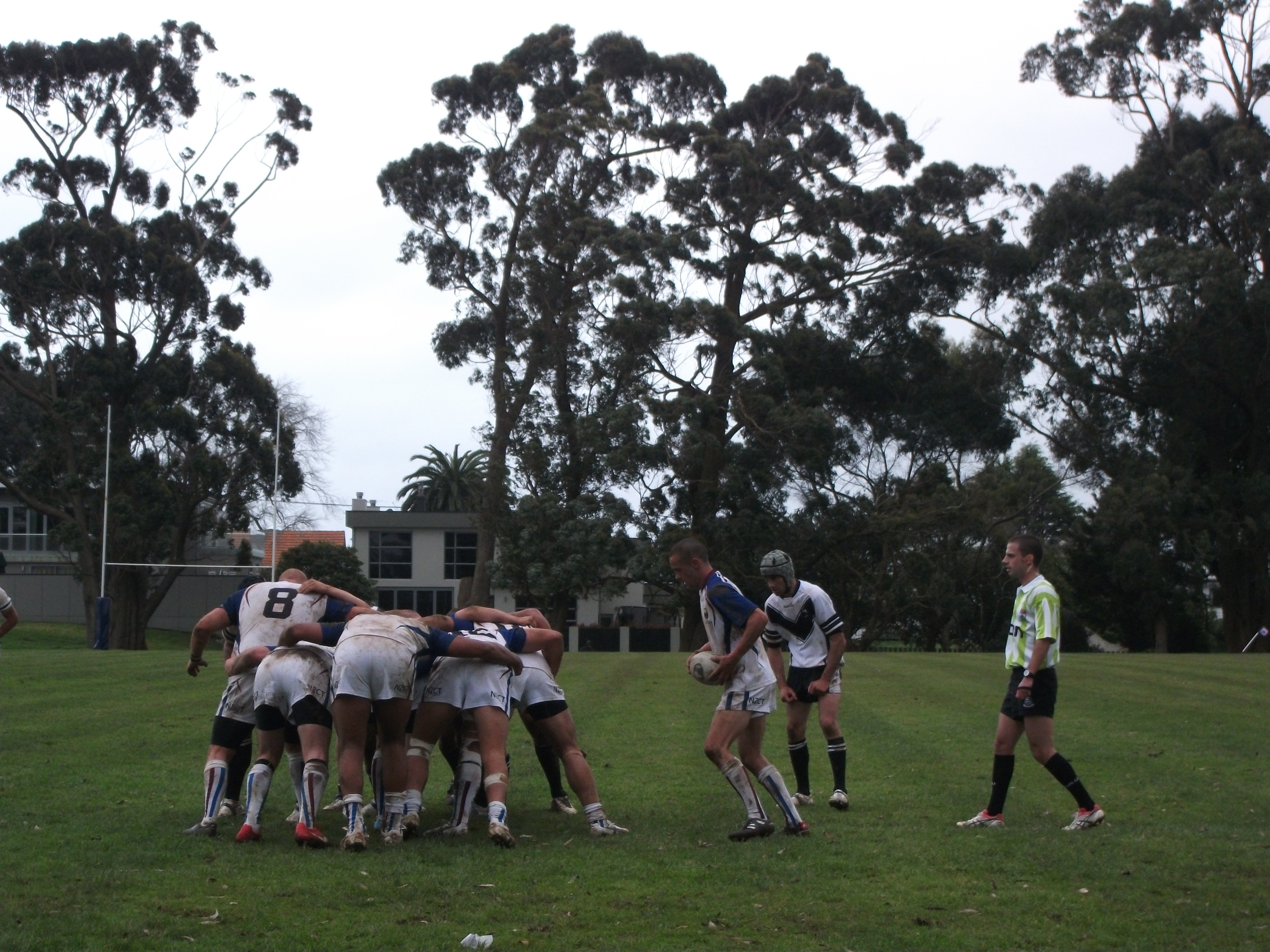
Auckland v South Island in Round Five

Following the Sparc funded review and restructure of the New Zealand Rugby League, seven new zonal teams competed in the 2010 National Zonal competition. Under 15's and Under 17's competitions were also to be held as curtain raisers to the senior matches. The Premiers competed for the Albert Baskerville Trophy which was won by Auckland, who defeated Counties Manukau 14 - 6 in the Grand Final.

==== Teams ====
The seven zones are;

- Northland Zone (Northern Swords): Consisting of the Northland and Whangarei districts, the Northern Swords were coached by Revell Neal. The Zone was initially to also include North Shore clubs but the Auckland Rugby League went to court to reduce the financial impact of a three-way split.
- Auckland Zone: Consisting of players from West, Central, North Harbour and Eastern Auckland, the Auckland team were coached by Northcote Tigers coach Ken McIntosh and included Sala Fa'alogo and Malo Solomona. The manager was Mick Lacey from the Ellerslie Eagles.
- Counties Manukau Zone: Consisting of players from South Auckland, including Otahuhu, Counties Manukau was coached by Rusty Matua with Richie Blackmore coaching the under 17's.
- Upper Central Zone (Waicoa Bay Stallions): Consisting of players from the Waikato, Coastline, Gisborne and Bay of Plenty districts the Waicoa Bay Stallions were coached by Tahe Morunga.
- Mid-Central Zone (Heartland): Consisting of players from the Taranaki, Wanganui, Hawkes Bay and Manawatu districts the Heartland premiers were coached by Mike Graham. Manawatu and Taranaki played a trial match before the squad was announced, with Manawatu victorious.
- Wellington Zone (Wellington Orcas): Drawn from the Wellington Rugby League competition the Wellington Orcas were coached by Trevor Clark while David Lomax coached the under 17s.* The side included Bureta Faraimo.
- Southern Zone (South Island): Drawn from the Tasman, West Coast, Canterbury, Otago and Southland districts the South Island team was coached by Brent Stuart with Mike Doreen coaching the under 17s. The premiers team included Jaye Pukepuke and Blair Sims. Sims later lost his life in the 2010 Pike River Mine disaster. Otago defeated Southland 26–20 in August.
- Gisborne and Hawkes Bay are included in Wellington Zone for administration purposes but their players play in the Upper Central and Mid-Central representative teams respectively.

==== Season standings ====
Team	Pld	W	D	L	B	PF	PA	Pts
Auckland	6	5	0	1	1	232	86	12
Counties Manukau	6	4	0	2	1	232	142	10
Wellington Orcas	6	4	0	2	1	188	100	10
South Island	6	4	0	2	1	196	126	10
Waicoa Bay Stallions	6	3	0	3	1	186	172	8
Heartland	6	1	0	5	1	132	146	4
Northern Swords	6	0	0	6	1	46	440	2

==== Schedule ====
===== Round 1 =====
Home	Score	Away	Match Information
Home	Score	Away	Date	Venue
South Island	28-6	Heartland	29 August	Rugby League Park, Christchurch
Wellington	22-8	Waicoa Bay	29 August	Fraser Park, Wellington
Auckland	28-16	Counties-Manukau	15 September	Mt Smart Stadium No.2, Auckland

- Bye: Northern

===== Round 2 =====
Home	Score	Away	Match Information
Home	Score	Away	Date	Venue
Northern	10-86	Counties-Manukau	5 September	Lindvart Park, Kaikohe
Auckland	18-24	Wellington	4 September	Cornwall Park, Auckland
Waicoa Bay	36-18	Heartland	5 September	Resthills Park, Hamilton

- Bye: South Island

===== Round 3 =====
Home	Score	Away	Match Information
Home	Score	Away	Date	Venue
South Island	34-36	Waicoa Bay	11 September	Burnham Military Camp
Heartland	14-24	Auckland	12 September	Clifton Park, Waitara
Wellington	74-0	Northern	12 September	Porirua Stadium, Wellington

- Bye: Counties-Manukau

===== Round 4 =====
Home	Score	Away	Match Information
Home	Score	Away	Date	Venue
Northern	16–64	South Island	19 September	Jubilee Park, Whangarei
Counties Manukau	42–12	Waicoa Bay	19 September	Bruce Pulman Park, Papakura
Heartland	10–18	Wellington	19 September	Arena Manawatu, Palmerston North

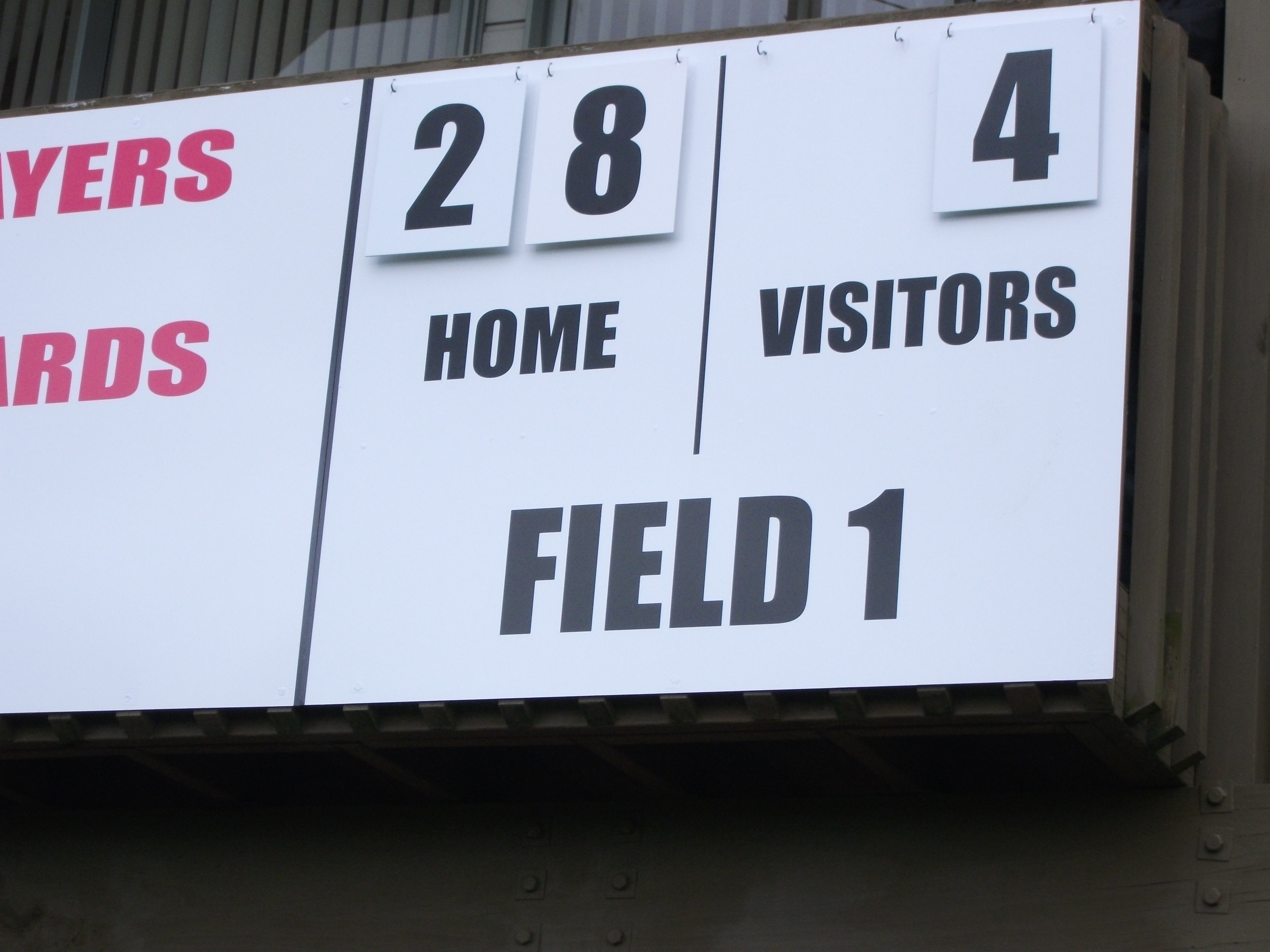
Auckland defeated the South Island 28–4 in Round Five

Bye: Auckland

===== Round 5 =====
Home	Score	Away	Match Information
Home	Score	Away	Date	Venue
Auckland	28-4	South Island	25 September	Cornwall Park, Auckland
Waicoa Bay	72-8	Northern	26 September	Blake Park, Tauranga
Counties Manukau	34-30	Wellington	26 September	Bruce Pulman Park, Papakura

Bye: Heartland

===== Round 6 =====
Home	Score	Away	Match Information
Home	Score	Away	Date	Venue
South Island	36-20	Counties Manukau	3 October	Rugby League Park, Christchurch
Heartland	58-6	Northern	3 October	Yarrow Stadium, New Plymouth
Waicoa Bay	22-48	Auckland	3 October	Puketawhero Park, Rotorua

Bye: Wellington

===== Round 7 =====
Home	Score	Away	Match Information
Home	Score	Away	Date	Venue
Wellington	20-30	South Island	10 October	Porirua Stadium, Wellington
Counties Manukau	34-26	Heartland	10 October	Bruce Pulman Park, Papakura
Northern	6-86	Auckland	10 October	Okura Park, Whangarei

Bye: Waicoa Bay

===== Grand final =====
Home	Score	Away	Match Information
Home	Score	Away	Date	Venue
Auckland	14 - 6	Counties Manukau	17 October	Mt Smart Stadium, Auckland

==== Mark Graham Cup ====
The Under 17 competition was named after Mark Graham. Counties Manukau beat Auckland 22 - 12 in the final to become the inaugural holders of the Mark Graham Cup.

==== Nathan Cayless Cup ====
The Under 15 competition was named after Nathan Cayless. Counties Manukau beat Wellington Orcas 30 - 16 in the final to become the inaugural holders of the Nathan Cayless Cup.

== Australian competitions ==
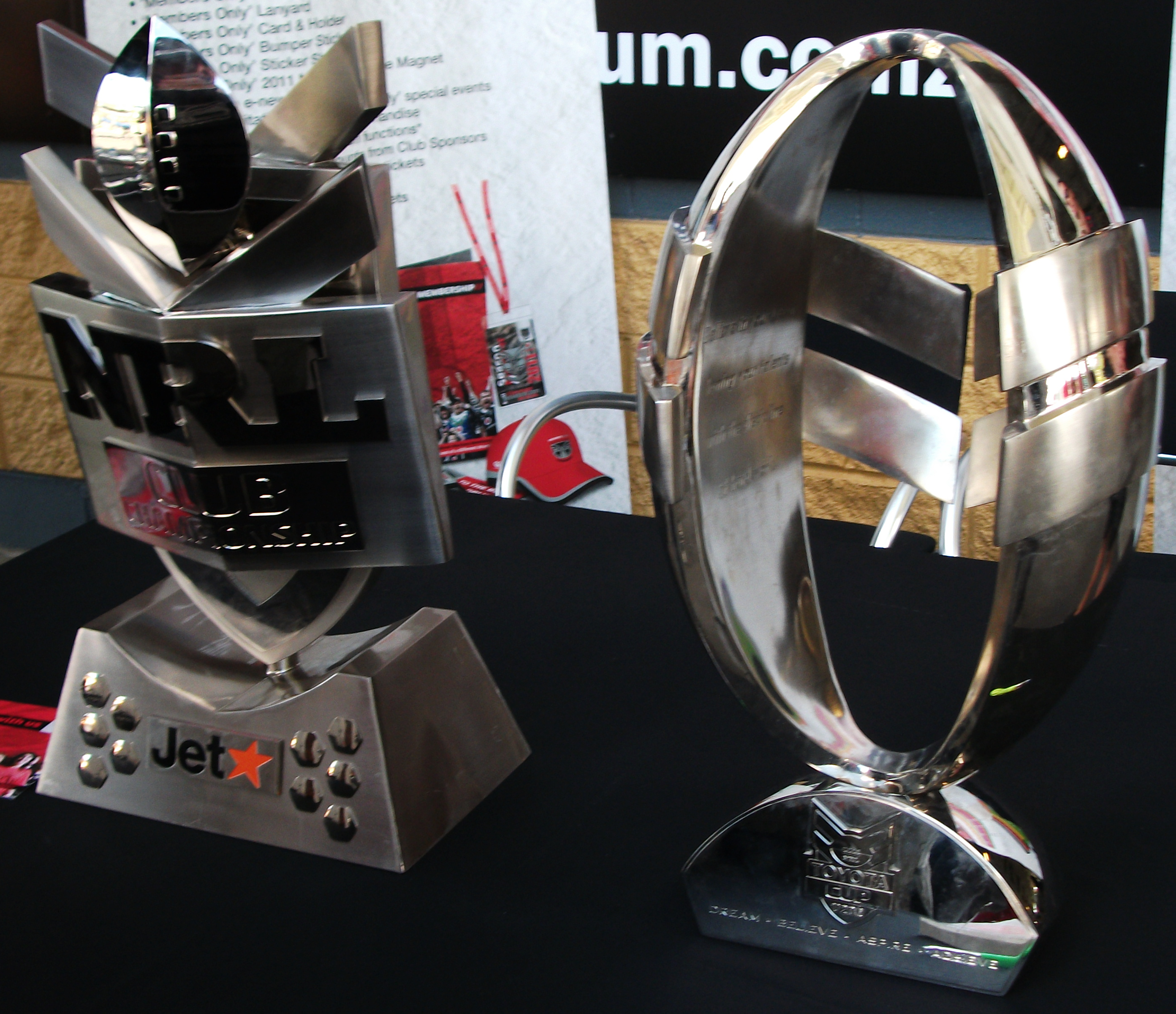
The Club Championship (left) and the Toyota Cup (right)

=== New Zealand Warriors ===
The New Zealand Warriors competed in the National Rugby League competition, finishing fifth in regular season before being eliminated after losing their Qualifying Final. The Warriors also fielded an under-20 side in the Toyota Cup who finished second in the regular season before going on to win the Toyota Cup Grand Final. This was the club's first grand final win at any level. The club also won the Club Championship for being the best performing club during the regular season (combined NRL and Toyota Cup results).

=== Auckland Vulcans ===
The Auckland Vulcans competed in the NSW Cup competition finishing ninth out of twelve teams and missing the finals by just one point.

== Club competitions ==
=== Auckland ===
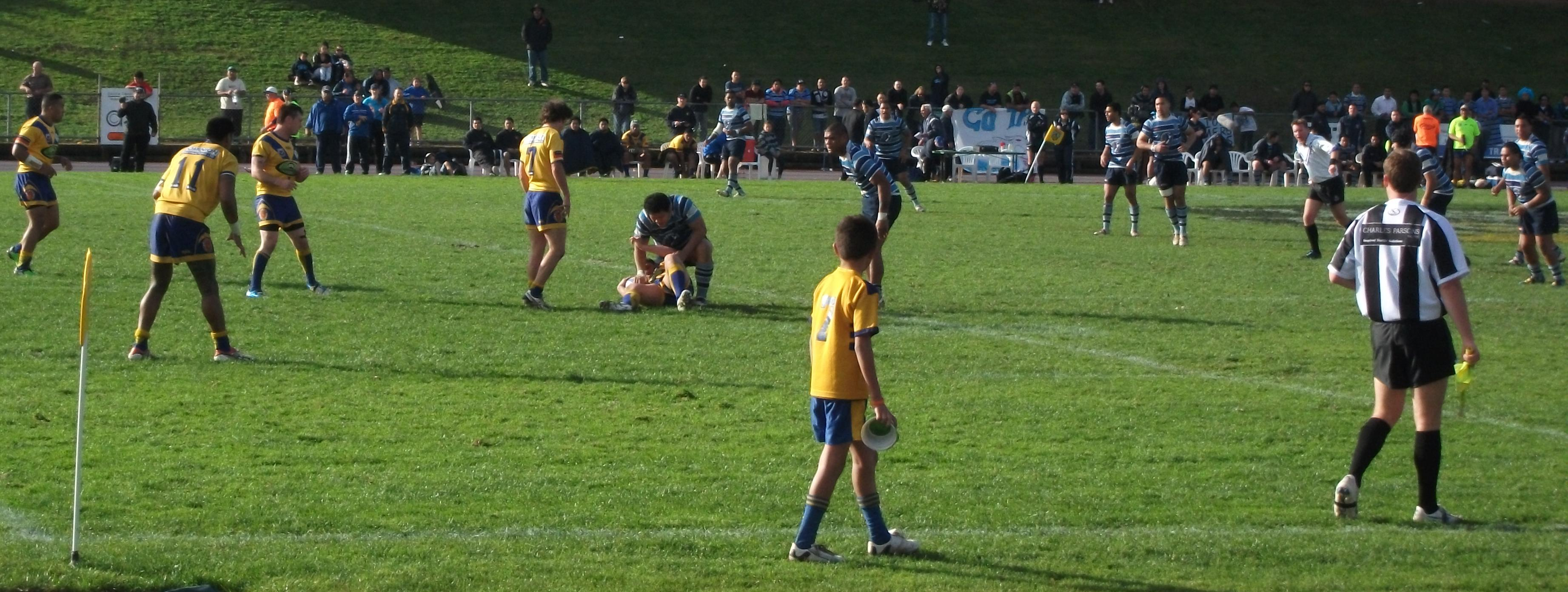
Otahuhu and Mt Albert play in the Fox Memorial grand final

Eight teams competed in the Lion Red Fox Memorial first division which was won by the minor premiers Otahuhu Leopards after they defeated the defending champions, the Mount Albert Lions, 22–18.

East Coast Bays won the Sharman Cup while the Point Chevalier Pirates, coached by Awen Guttenbeil and Stacey Jones, won the Phelan Shield.

=== Wellington ===
Eight teams competed in the Wellington Rugby League's Premier Appleton Shield in 2010. The Porirua Vikings defeated the Wainuiomata Lions 18–10 at Fraser Park on 14 August. The Lions had earlier finished the regular season as minor premiers.

Upper Hutt College won the secondary schools Stephen Kearney Cup competition by defeating Rongotai College 30–16. They are unbeaten in secondary schools rugby league since 2007.

=== Canterbury ===
Eight teams competed in the Canterbury Rugby League's Harringtons Premiership in 2010. The Papanui Tigers won the minor premiership. The Tigers lost 6–22 in the grand final which was won by the Hornby Panthers at Rugby League Park on 15 August.

In March, prop Vince Whare was banned for ten years following a positive test for cannabis after a 2009 Bartercard Premiership match. Whare had previously been warned and fined in 2005 and banned in 2006 for two years for the same offence.

Phil Prescott coached Halswell.

=== Other competitions ===
The Hamilton City Tigers won the Waikato Rugby League competition, defeating Taniwharau Rugby League 19–12 to claim the Lion Breweries Trophy.

Clubs from the Bay of Plenty, Coastline and Gisborne districts played in a full round championship. The Otumoetai Eels won the competition, defeating the Ngongotaha Chiefs 24–18. The Waikato and Tri-district champions were then scheduled to meet in a play-off however the match was called off after the Otumoetai Eels and Waikato Rugby League could not agree on sharing the revenue. Matthew Spence was the Turangi Dambusters' player-coach while David Peachey played for the Taupo Phoenix.

The Paikea Whalers and Tapuae met in the Gisborne Tairawhiti Rugby League grand final.

The Waitara Bears defeated the Marist Dragons 32–22 in the Taranaki Lile Shield premier grand final at Yarrow Stadium. The Coastal Cobras and Hawera Hawks were the semi-finalists.

The Feilding Falcons defeated the Marist Dragons 20–18 to win the combined Taranaki-Manawatu Western Division. Later in the season the Falcons defeated the Linton Cobras 32–6 to also win the Manawatu Rugby League competition.

The Stoke Cobras won the Tasman rugby league competition, defeating the Tahuna Tigers 34—26 in a grand final that was attended by Simon Mannering and Micheal Luck.

Blair Sims was named the West Coast Rugby League's player of the season.

The Lone Star Hawks won the Otago Rugby League grand final, defeating the Todd Engineering Pirates 28–12.

The Winton Warlords upset favourites He Tauaa 30–22 to win the Southland Rugby League grand final.

== See also ==
- 2010 in rugby league
