= Laurie Mills =

New Zealand rugby league player (1918–1941)

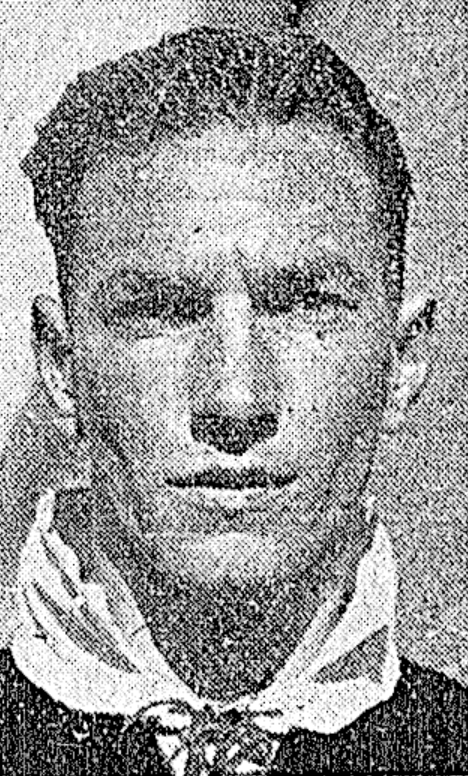

Personal information
- Full name: Laurence Douglas Mills
- Born: 12 March 1918 Auckland, New Zealand
- Died: 1 December 1941 (aged 23) Libya

Playing information
- Height: 5 ft 11 in (180 cm)
- Weight: 11 st 10 lb (164 lb; 74 kg)
- Position: Wing
Club
Years	Team	Pld	T	G	FG	P
1938–1940	Richmond Rovers	47	29	0	0	87
Representative
Years	Team	Pld	T	G	FG	P
1939	North Island	1	1	0	0	3
1939	New Zealand	1	0	0	0	0

Laurence Douglas Mills (12 March 1918 – 1 December 1941) was a rugby league player who represented New Zealand in 1939 on their tour of England becoming the 280th player to do so.

== Early life ==
Mills was born on 12 March 1918 in Auckland, New Zealand. His father was Ephraim Raymond (Ray) Mills (1886–1957), and his mother was Irene Winifred Mills (nee. Brokenshire) (1889–1972). He had one sibling, an older brother, Raymond Samuel Albert Mills (1916–2007). His father had been born in Freeman’s Bay in central Auckland and had served in World War 1. The family was living in Grey Lynn at the time of Laurie’s birth on Francis Street. Ephraim was a plumber by trade which was the profession Laurie later adopted. He attended Mount Albert Grammar School in the suburb of Mount Albert in Auckland during the early to mid 1930s. He is memorialised on their school War Memorial. The family lived at 47 Old Mill Road, Grey Lynn in the 1920s into the early 1930s when they then moved to 19 Stanmore Road in Grey Lynn.

== Playing career ==
=== Juniors 1930–1933 ===
In 1930 Mills was playing for the Richmond schoolboys team on the wing and on 17 May in a 15–0 win over Otahuhu Rovers he scored four tries. Earlier in the year he had played cricket and in a match for Richmond West in the Auckland Primary Schools Cricket Association competition he scored 31 not out against Brixton Road. His brother Ray was also in the team and in the same game scored 24 not out. They were attending Westmere Primary School and in December 1930 were selected for an Eden Park group team to play a Western Suburbs side in a game at Mount Albert.

In early August Laurie was selected in the Auckland central district side to play in the inter-provincial primary school representative matches for the Roller Mill Shield at Hamilton. At the end of the month he was selected for the Auckland Primary Schools representative team to play at Ngaruawahia on 12 September. In the side was Arthur McInnarney and the two would go on to be the first ever Auckland primary school representative players to be selected for the New Zealand. Coincidentally both players had been born on 12 March 1918.

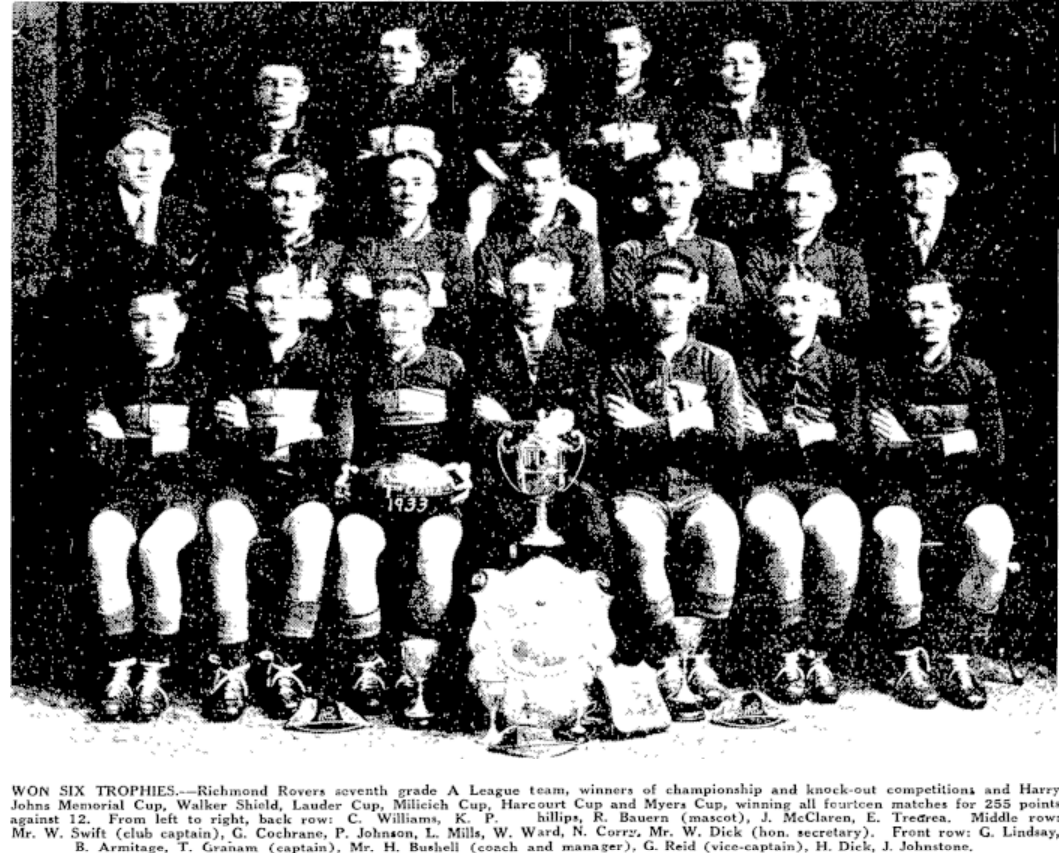
The 1933 team which won the seventh grade championship and several other trophies.

In 1933 Mills had progressed to the Richmond 7th grade team. The team won the championship (Myers Cup), the knockout competition, and was awarded the Harry Johns Memorial Cup for the best Richmond club team which had been named in honour of their young senior player who had been killed due to head injuries in a boxing match in October the year prior. They also won the Lauder Cup, Walker Shield, Milicich Cup, and Harcourt Cup. A photograph of the team appeared in the 21 October edition of the Auckland Star with Laurie in the centre of the middle row.

=== Richmond Reserves (1937) ===
It is unclear which teams Mills was playing for Richmond from 1934 to 1937 as the team lists were not published in the Auckland newspapers and there was relatively little coverage of the junior competitions. However it was stated several times in following years that he had played for Richmond throughout the grades before debuting in their senior side. In 1937 Mills was regularly listed in the Richmond reserve grade teams. On 28 August he played in their side which travelled to Kamo, a northern suburb of Whangarei to play the local competition winners, Kamo. He scored a try in a 27–17 win. Kamo were unable to field a full strength side and fielded five Hikurangi players and the game was still described as a fast, open match. When the score was 11–11 Mills “touched down at the end of a very nice passing bout”. In the meantime the Richmond reserves had won the reserve grade competition (Norton Cup). The competition did not have all of its results reported but of the ten games they had scores reported for they were unbeaten.

=== Richmond seniors (1938) ===
The 1938 season saw Mills make his senior grade debut. He was named in their squad for a preliminary round game on 2 April against Mount Albert on Carlaw Park #1 at 3pm. He scored a try in their 24–15 loss and it was said that “two new players, Mills and Graham, showed up prominently in the second half”. The Auckland Star wrote “Richmond tried out Mills and Graham, two of their junior backs, and both did impressive work…”. He impressed enough to be named in their squad for their Fox Memorial Shield championship opening game the following weekend against Papakura. He scored another try in their 17–14 win which was on the Carlaw Park #2 field with 3,000 in attendance at the games. During the second half “the [Richmond] backs supported the forwards well and Mills scored”. The New Zealand Herald said “both Graham and Mills, promoted juniors, did really well, especially the former at centre three-quarter”. He played again in round 2 with Richmond beating Ponsonby United 18–13. In the first half with the score 5–2 to Richmond they attacked and “after a run by Mills the ball came infield and [Merv] Devine scored”. In the second half “Mills lost a try for Richmond when he failed to hold his pass”. After the game it was noted that “Mills showed speed on the wing, but his handling was uncertain”. The Herald wrote “the Richmond backs made many mistakes against Ponsonby, especially in handling. It was something unusual to see [Noel] Bickerton and [Wally] Tittleton offend while Mills, on the wing, dropped three passes and missed tries”. Richmond’s next game came against Newton Rangers in round 3 which they lost 8–7. It is unclear if Mills played after his indifferent display. Their team list was not published the day before the game and he was not mentioned in the match report though several other backs were.

He definitely played in their round 4 game on 30 April against North Shore Albions as he scored a try in a 20–19 win. The match was controversial as the referee erroneously awarded an obstruction try to be converted in front of the posts rather than out wide where the offence occurred. As a result the game was ordered to be replayed later in the season if it was going to have a material effect on the championship. Mills try came early in the second half and was converted by Frank Furnell which gave Richmond a 15–14 lead. Mills was not named in their match day squads for either of the next two games against Marist Old Boys and Manukau respectively.

Mills returned to the side for their 28 May, round 7 game with Mount Albert United and scored a try in their 29–7 win. On 4 June he played in a friendly match against the Huntly club from the Waikato to celebrate the opening of Richmond’s new club rooms at the Grey Lynn Park ground. They then beat City Rovers 19–3 on 11 June. Alf Broadhead scored a try after he “profited from a fine opening by Mills”. He and Trevor Bramley, “in the three-quarter line, showed very promising form”. His next game was in a 16–10 win over Papakura at Prince Edward Park in Papakura. They then suffered a 19–13 loss to Ponsonby on 25 June with Mills scoring a controversial try. The Herald wrote “Richmond was decidedly lucky, however, when Mills, the wing three-quarter, was awarded a try. Mills lost possession and never got near to touching down. The decision caused a demonstration from the spectators in the grandstand”. In comments on the game the Auckland Star wrote that “Bramley made a great success of the centre position, going straight and drawing his marker well before sending the ball on, with the result that Mills, on the wing, got some great chances”.

Mills then played in a 16–2 loss to Newton in round 12, and an 18–5 win over North Shore in round 13. In the latter game Lyndsay Jack “was prominent on the wing and showed plenty of initiative. Mills, on the other wing, was also good”. Then in terrible conditions Richmond lost 11–3 to Mount Albert at Carlaw Park. Jack Tristram scored a try for Mount Albert where he was pulled down from behind by Mills but managed to get over the line. Later in the first half Mills nearly scored after the ball rolled clear when Merv Devine had been stopped by the Mount Albert fullback A McLachlan. The Richmond backs struggled and “only on a few occasions did [they] get into combined action, and when they did Mills, on the wing, ran strongly and gamely”.

On 30 July Mills scored a try in a 6–6 draw with Manukau but he was also badly concussed and taken to the hospital. The Auckland Star wrote a short piece which said “concussion was suffered by Lawrence Douglas Mills, an apprentice plumber, aged 20, single of 19 Stanmore Road, Grey Lynn, while playing rugby league football at Carlaw Park, in the game between Richmond and Manukau seniors”, he along with two other players were taken to Auckland Hospital. His try came in the first half before he later left the field with his injury. It came when he started a movement “with a strong side-line dash” and who then when met by the converging defence “sent the ball in-field, and others took up the running”. The ball then went to ground but Jack McLeod gathered the ball up on the run and “finally Mills was up again in position for the last pass to cross wide out”. His injury came when he “dived in to tackle when [Jack] Brodrick broke away with the ball, and although he brought his opponent down heavily, he got a hard knock in the process”. He had to be carried from the field. As a result of his injury he missed the next two games on 6 and 20 August.

Mills returned to the side on 3 September in round 2 of the Roope Rooster knockout competition. He scored a try in their 19–6 win over Ponsonby on Carlaw Park #1. A week later in their 20–7 win over North Shore in the semi final he and Maurice Potter “were prominent among the backs”. Richmond then won the final against City, winning 20–8 on 17 September with Mills scoring another try. The wings, Keith Fletcher and Mills “showed plenty of dash when chances came their way”. The pair “showed pace, enterprise and ability to penetrate”.

Richmond then played Eastern Suburbs, the Sydney club side who were touring New Zealand. They met on 1 October at Carlaw Park. Before a crowd of 11,000 Richmond won 11–9 with Mills scoring one of their three tries. He played on the right wing opposed by Rod O'Loan. In the first half Mills “made an easy try for Wally Tittleton” except that to the dismay of the crowd he lost possession when over the try line. With Richmond leading 8–3 Mills “lowered O'Loan with a good tackle”, then a while later he charged down [Jim] Norton's attempt to clear and he scored to give Richmond an 11–3 lead at halftime. His final game of the season was in the Stormont Shield (champion of champion) game on 8 October. Richmond won 9–8 with wings Lyndsay Jack and Mills, playing "splendid football with limited opportunities”.

=== New Zealand, North Island, and Richmond (1939) ===
==== Richmond ====
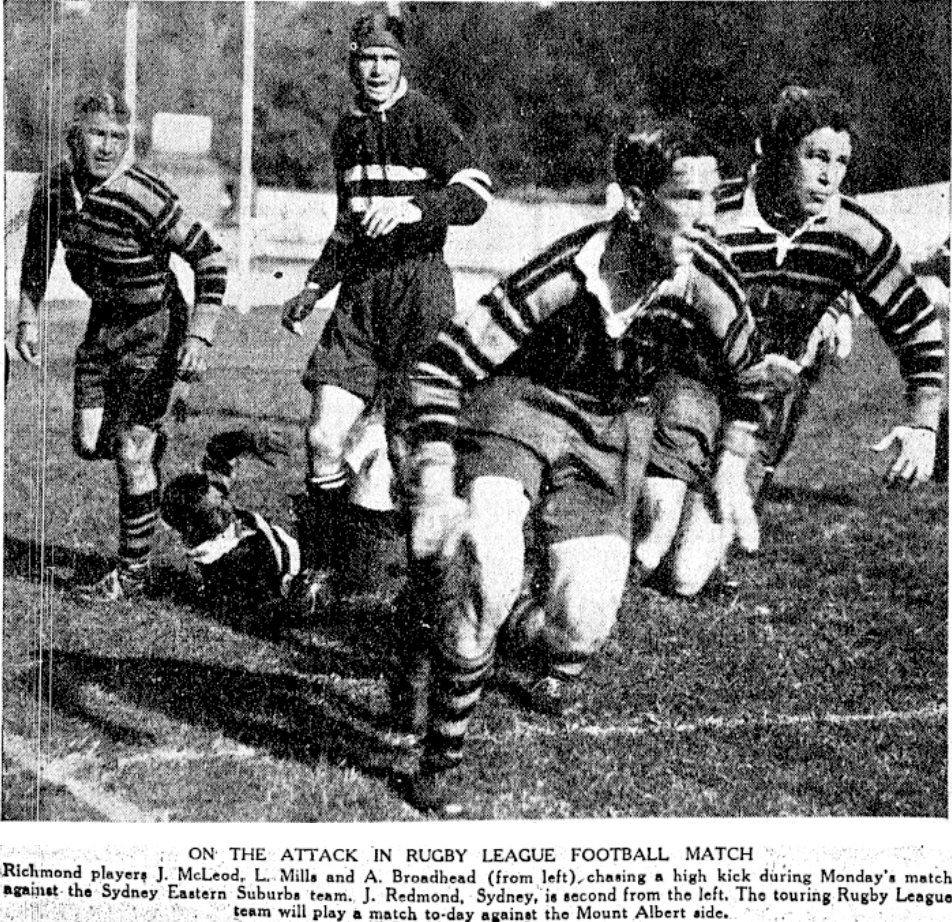

The 1939 season saw Mills continue in his now established position of winger for the Richmond senior side. He played 13 games for them and was selected for the New Zealand team to tour England at the midway point of the season. His first game was on 1 April in round 1 of the championship against City Rovers. He scored two tries in their 15–14 win. His first came a few minutes into the second half when he “gathered a weak City clearing kick, and went in practically unopposed”. Then “fortunes fluctuated until Mills finished off a Richmond passing bout to score another try”. The Herald said that his first try came when he followed up a cross kick and gathered the ball on the bounce. The second try came when Jack McLeod “started a movement, and [Lyndsay] Jack beat the defence nicely and passed to [Wally] Tittleton, who burst through, and Mills finished off the dash with a good try”. They also said that “Mills stood out as the best of the wings and is a dangerous player near the goal line”. On 10 April Richmond played a touring team from Australia. They were originally going to be the Eastern Suburbs side but several of their players could not make the trip so the side included players from several other Sydney sides and were a Sydney XIII. He was on the opposite wing to Fred Tottey. Richmond won 17–16 with Mills showing “glimpses of brilliance on the wing”. The Herald had a paragraph headed “Mills Plays Well” which included “Mills, on the wing, played a splendid game and paved the way for good tries”. A Mitchell “raced from halfway, and when a try looked certain Mills came fast and tackled the centre 10yds from the goal line”. In the second half he and Merv Devine “made great efforts to score, only to be thrown out a yard from the line”.

His next two games were against North Shore Albions on 22 April, and then Mount Albert United on 29 April. Richmond beat Manukau in round 6 on 13 May with “speed and dash by Mills in a very bright display on the wing”. During the second half Abbie Graham “easily beat [Mihaka] Panapa and play swung quickly to Mills, who sent the ball back infield and four forwards handled, only to see [George] Nēpia rush in and tackle Devine”. In general comments the Herald wrote that “the wings, Mills and [Keith] Fletcher, played well with limited opportunities”. He scored a try the following week when Richmond travelled to Prince Edward Park in Papakura to play the local side. They won 23 to 17. The former All Black Dave Solomon debuted for Richmond in the match. It was said that Graham, Mills and Furnell “played fine football”. The Franklin Times said “a great battle in the corner resulted in Mills going across” to finish the game.

The New Zealand Herald wrote a piece about players who had been showing form so far in the competition with Mills listed along with other three quarters Roy Hardgrave, Brian Riley, Arthur McInnarney, and Ray Halsey. In a 14–10 loss to Ponsonby on 27 May Mills didn’t receive much ball. Only on rare occasions was he “able to demonstrate his exceptional pace on the wing” where he “played a dashing game”. Richmond then lost 22–11 to Newton on 3 June, before a catchup game against Marist two days later on Monday 5 June. Richmond won 24 to 10. In the second half Marist winger Ray Halsey made a mistake and “Mills snapped up in the loose and passed to McLeod, who raced 40 yards to score in a good position”. In round 10 Mills scored a try in Richmond’s 8–0 win against City. He “attacked brilliantly when the ball reached him”. The herald wrote “for Richmond the outstanding player was Mills, who played a fine game on the wing. He showed plenty of determination and anticipation above the ordinary. On this form he has strong claims for a trial in one of the representative fixtures”. He then played in a 26–14 win over Marist on 17 June, and then a 9–8 loss to North Shore on 24 June. Against Shore “Mills and Kronfeld, the Richmond wings showed great pace and enterprise”. In an 11–6 loss to Mount Albert he scored both of their tries. The Auckland Star said “Mills on the wing, showed resource and great speed in attack, his two tries being splendid efforts”. His first try came when Dave Solomon grubbered a kick through which he recovered and then sent on to Mills who ran “round behind the posts for a fine try Then he “cut in cleverly from the right wing to beat the defence and score under the posts”. He and Kronfeld on the other wing “both played good games”.

==== North Island ====
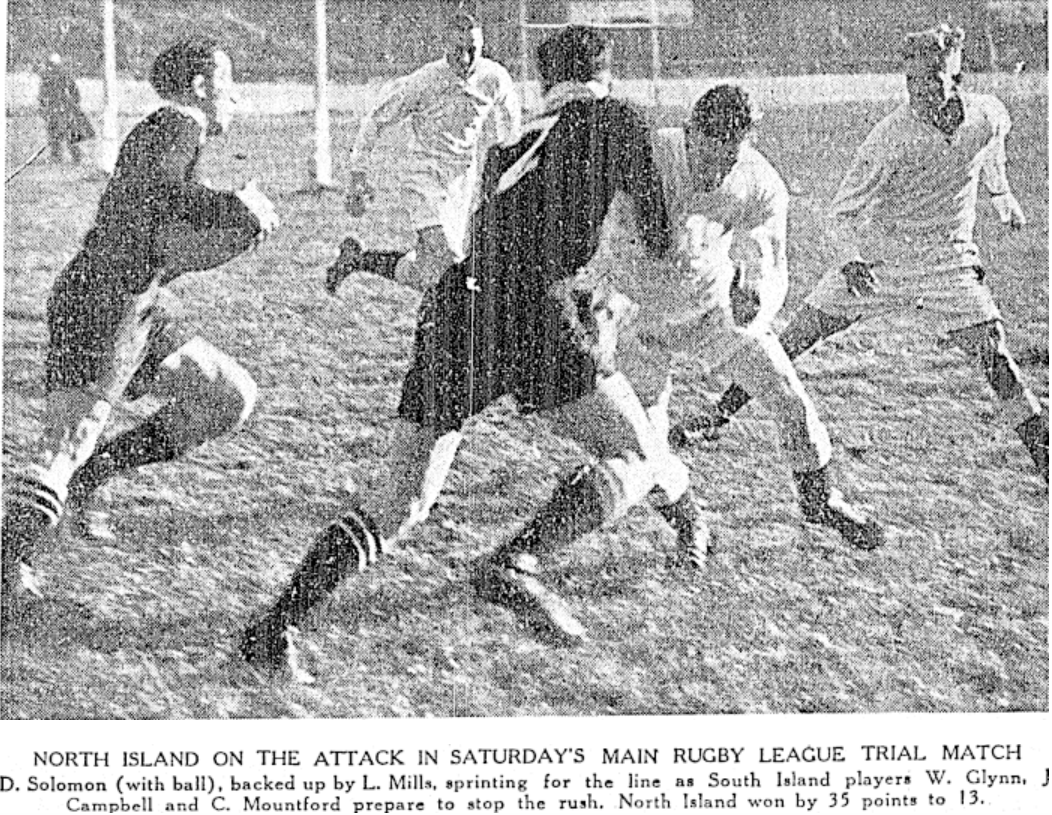
Mills running in support of North Island team mate Dave Solomon.

Mills form was good enough to see him selected in the North Island team to play the South Island in their annual inter-island fixture on 8 July. It was suggested when the team was named that the North Island side was adopting the four three-quarter approach rather than the three which was the norm in New Zealand rugby league in all teams in these decades. “on the wings will be Roy Nurse of Ponsonby and Mills, of Richmond, two young players with pace and scoring ability, whose disability in club games is that the ball does not reach them with frequency”. The selectors were Scotty McClymont, Hec Brisbane, and Gordon Hooker. The Herald wrote that the “inclusion of R. Nurse and L. Mills on the wings will give rise to criticism. Mills, however, has shown splendid form and has speed and ability to beat the defence by clever swerving. However, he, like Nurse has been given a heavy responsibility as a young player, and it will be interesting to see how they react to the test”. The North Island won the match 35 to 13 with Mills scoring a try in the match at Carlaw Park. It was reported that “of the wings, “Nurse, who scored the first tries, had more clear opportunities than Mills, and generally played well. Mills, however, did everything asked of him, and is a very promising player”. With the score 8–0 to the North Island Mills “was checked” and “sent the ball back to [Wally] Tittleton who scored”. His try came in the second half when Solomon “dummied Priest, cut past Scott, and sent Mills over for a good try”.

==== New Zealand selection ====
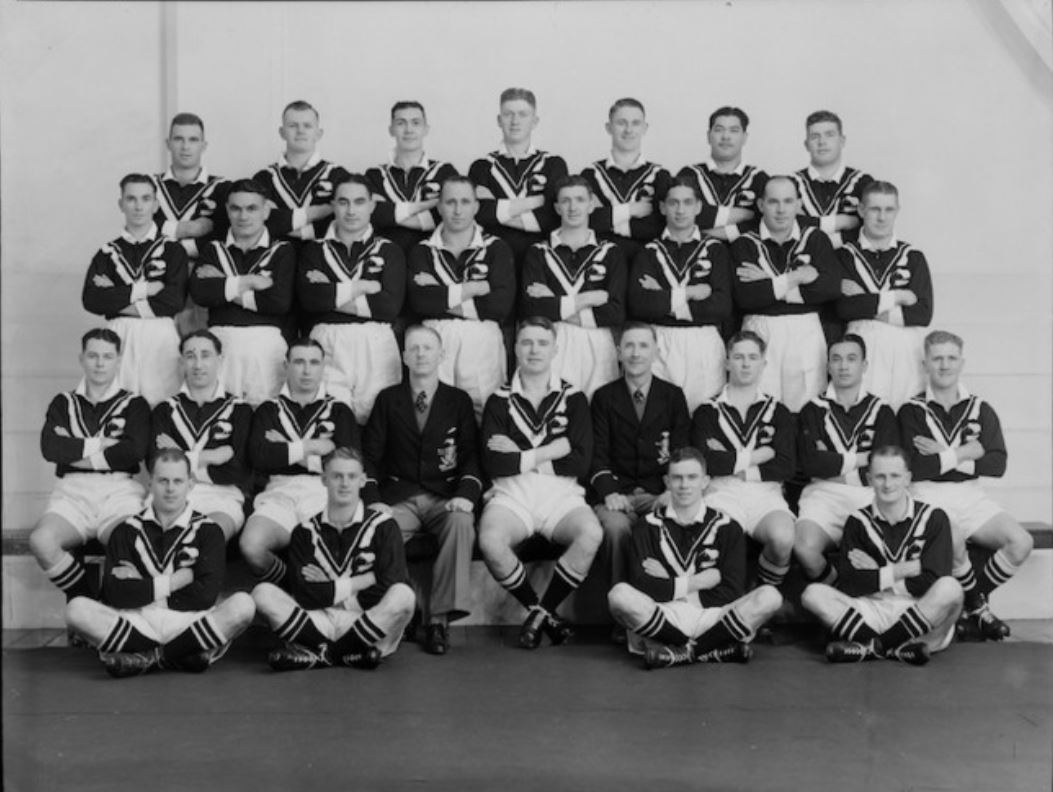
Mills on the extreme left in the second from back row.

Following the game against the South Island the New Zealand selectors, Scotty McClymont, Jack Redwood, and Jim Amos picked the New Zealand team for their tour of England with Mills named in the three-quarters. They were choosing 26 players to tour and named Mills in the initial group of 18. In brief pieces on the players it was said if Mills that he weighed 11 stone, and “is a member of the Richmond club, and is in his second year of senior football. He is one of the best players in Auckland, very fast and a good scoring back”. Along with Mills, Ces Davison was selected as a wing three-quarter in the initial 18, and then Jack Campbell and Arthur McInnarney were added. There was an opportunity for Mills to play one more game for Richmond before departing for the tour but he, Wally Tittleton, and George Mitchell were all left out of the side for their game against Manukau.

On Saturday, 22 July a parade of junior players in honour of the Auckland players chosen for the tour was held at Carlaw Park. The programme included short speeches and “the presentation of gifts from the Schoolboys’ Association to two members of the New Zealand team, A.J. McInnarney and L.D. Mills, the first products of Auckland Rugby League school grades to earn national honours with a team going overseas”. Then on 24 July a farewell dance was held at the Peter Pan Cabaret in Auckland for the team and they were presented with their ties.

On 26 July the Auckland members were farewelled at Auckland Train Station by family and supporters as they departed for Wellington.

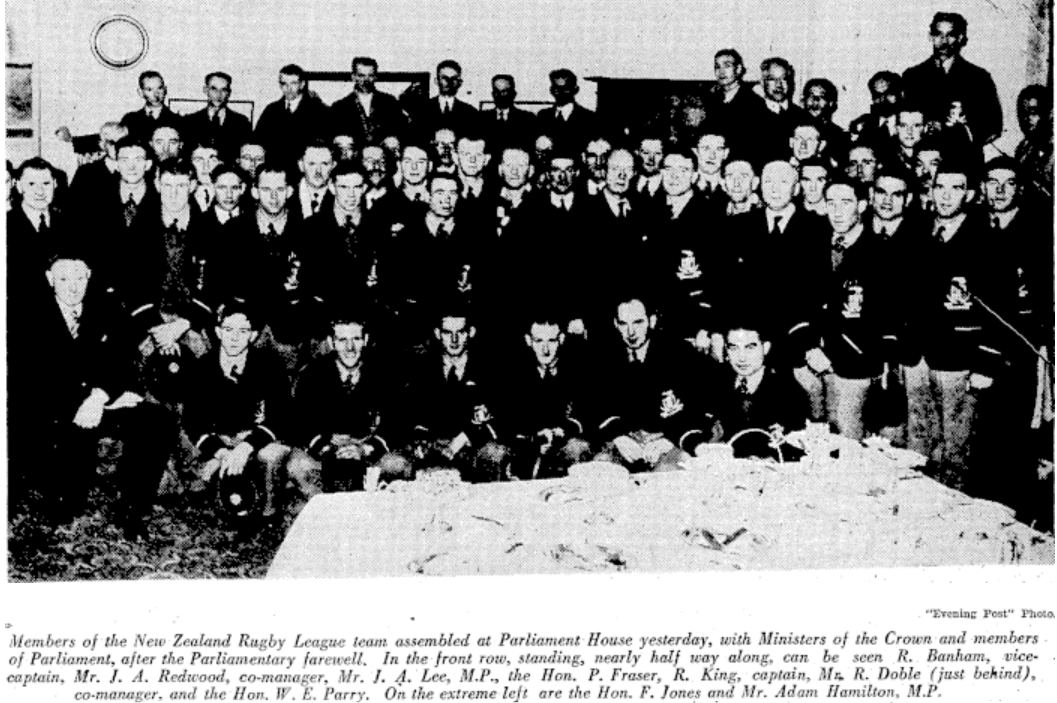
The New Zealand team at a farewell function held in the Parliament Buildings.

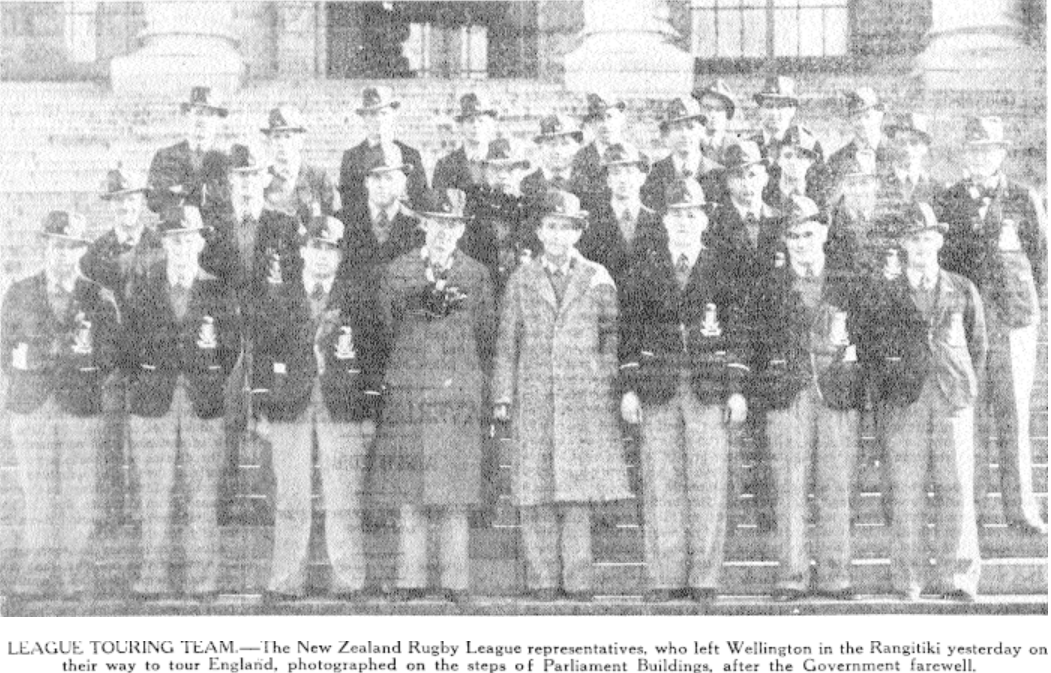
The New Zealand side on the steps of Parliament following their farewell function.

On the morning of the 27th the team and management attended a morning tea in the Parliament Buildings with "good wishes extended to the Kiwis, by Deputy-Prime Minister, the Hon. Peter Fraser, who expressed hope that they would have a successful tour".

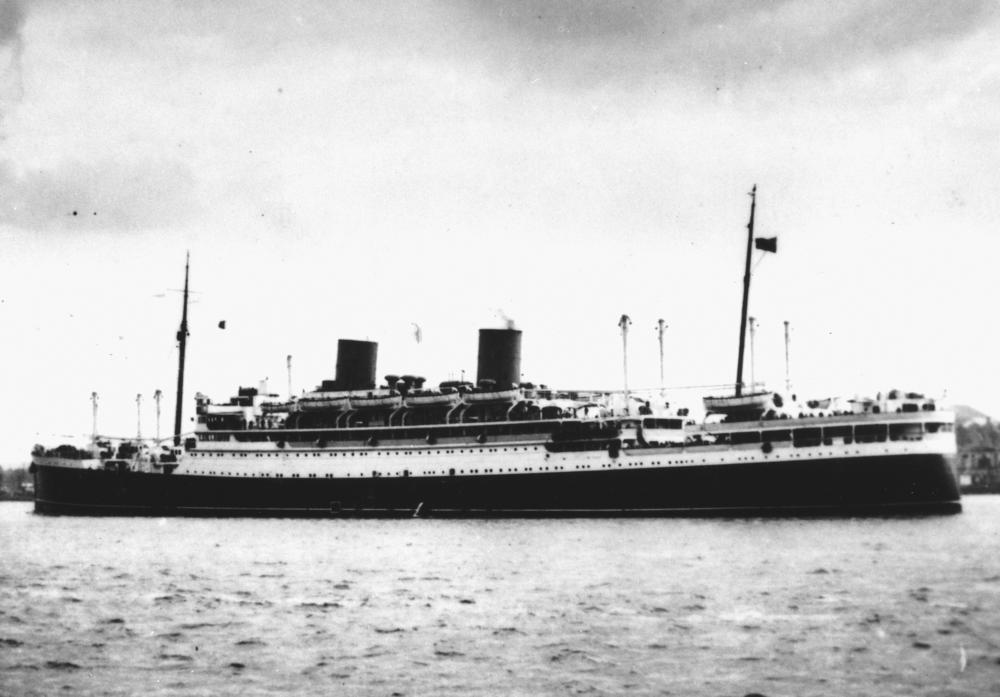
StateLibQld 1 170635 Rangitiki (ship)

The team departed Wellington for London on board the RMS Rangitiki in Tourist Class on Friday 28 July.

It was intended for the tour to consist of 23 matches in England including three tests and then six or seven matches in France however the tour was to be cut very short due the outbreak of World War 2. The war which would ultimate cost Mills his life. The first match of the tour was against St Helens on 2 September with Jack Campbell and Laurie Mills named as the wingers. New Zealand won 19 points to 3 at Knowsley Road before 4,000 spectators. A day later, on 3 September Britain declared war on Germany which effectively ended the tour. The second match against Hull Kingston Rovers scheduled for 7 September was cancelled as arrangements were hurriedly made to get the New Zealand side home.

In a letter from managers Jack Redwood and R. Doble they said after war broke out the team had to stay at Beechwood House, Harrogate in the north of England "under the insistence of the English authorities. The players went on A.R.P. (Air Raid Precaution) work, filling and stacking sandbags, and had agreed to keep together under the circumstances". The team had "experienced one air-raid scare at Harrogate" in Yorkshire. They later moved to a different city and the letter concluded "we hope to see you soon. The boys are disappointed at the turn in events, but are happy and well". They managed to organise a match against Dewsbury on 9 September just prior to their departure. The wingers for this match were Jack Smith and Tommy Chase. New Zealand won 22–10 at Crown Flatt (Dewsbury) before a crowd of 6,200. The team then returned to New Zealand on board the same liner which took them to England, the RMS Rangitiki.

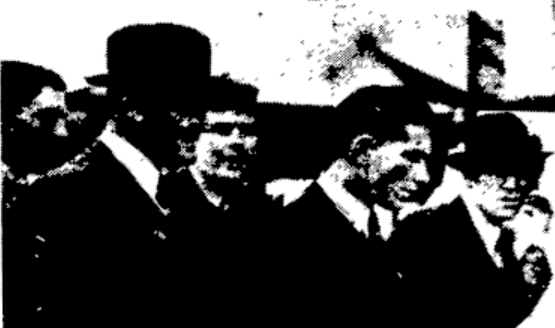
Mills in the centre side-on after returning from the tour. With him are team mates George Beadle

After their return co-manager Jack Redwood made comments to the media and he said “English critics were greatly impressed by the playing strength of the New Zealand forwards, and two outstanding players were Ross Jones and Harold Milliken. [Jack] Hemi in the backs caught the fancy of the crowds with his spectacular play and wonderful kicking. [Dave] Solomon’s all-round constructive play was very impressive, and Mills, of Richmond, and [Ivor] Stirling, of North Shore, were two of the younger players who showed great promise”. On 26 October a dinner was held for the returning players from the tour, arranged by the Auckland Rugby League ladies’ committee. It took place at the Station Hotel.

=== Richmond (1940) ===
The 1940 season saw Mills play 17 games for Richmond and was selected for Auckland Pākehā to play Auckland Māori but was not in the amended team which took the field before he left New Zealand to fight in World War 2. His first game of the season was for Richmond against Marist on 6 April. The game was a preliminary round match with Richmond and Marist drawing 8–8 and Mills scoring one try and “showed excellent form”. Then in the first round of the Fox Memorial championship Mills scored two tries in a big 56–2 win over Papakura. On the wing he “showed some of that dash and determination which won him a place in the New Zealand side last season”. Other comments said “Mills is a greatly improved wing and his play was impressive”. In an 11–6 loss to Newton he “was seen in a subdued light” along with team mates Abbie Graham and Wally Tittleton. He played in a 15–12 win over North Shore and a 4–4 draw with Manukau but was not mentioned in the match reports. He returned to the try scorers in a round 5 win over City by 19 points to 8.

Mills form was obviously good enough to be selected in the Auckland Pākehā team to play Auckland Māori on 8 June at Carlaw Park. The selectors were Hec Brisbane, Bill Cloke, and Dougie McGregor. Before the game he played in another club match for Richmond against Ponsonby on 1 June. The Auckland Pākehā side won 10–7 before a crowd of 6,000. When the match was played Mills was missing from the side and Bill McKenzie took his place in the side. There was no reason given for Mills’ absence.

He played for his Richmond side the following round on 15 June indicating that he was probably not injured. Mills scored twice in a 20–10 win against Marist on 22 June and “was prominent among the backs”. Then in their next game in round 10 he scored two more tries in a 32–2 win over Papakura on Carlaw Park #2 field. Dave Solomon “again proved that he is in a class by himself. He made many clever openings for Tittleton and Mills to bring success”. The New Zealand Herald wrote that “the outstanding Richmond back was L. Mills, who played a splendid game on the wing. He showed a lot of speed and his elusive running gained ground on many occasions”.

Another try came for Mills in their 18–7 win over Newton in round 11 on Carlaw Park #2 field again. With Mills and Wally Tittleton playing “up to their best form” according to the Auckland Star. While the Herad said “Mills, on the wing, made the most of his few opportunities”. Another two tries came for Mills in an 18–13 win against North Shore. This time the game was the feature match on the #1 field before a large crowd of 7,000. The “three-quarters were all determined attackers, with Mills and Tittleton receiving the most chances”. He scored his fifth double of the season when crossing twice in a 22–6 win over Manukau in round 13. He and Harrison on the other side of the field were “a pair of determined wingmen”.

On 3 August Richmond beat City 22–8 to close in on the Fox Memorial championship title. The Auckland Star in comments on the game said that Trevor Bramley and Mills “are high class wingers”. While the Herald wrote “Mills and Tittleton were the most impressive of the three-quarters”. Against Ponsonby in round 15 Richmond won 10–6 with backs “Williams, Graham, Solomon, Tittleton, Mills and Bramley working like a machine when they got a real chance”. It was said that he and Bramley “showed initiative on the wings”. This was the last confirmed game that Mills played for Richmond. He was named in the squads for games against Marist on 17 August but it appears that H Harrison and Andrew Kronfeld were the wings for the game. While the following weekend they had a bye and played a friendly match against Huntly South at Carlaw Park but there was no mention of Mills in the reports. Richmond was confirmed as the championship winners at this point in the season.

== World War 2 ==
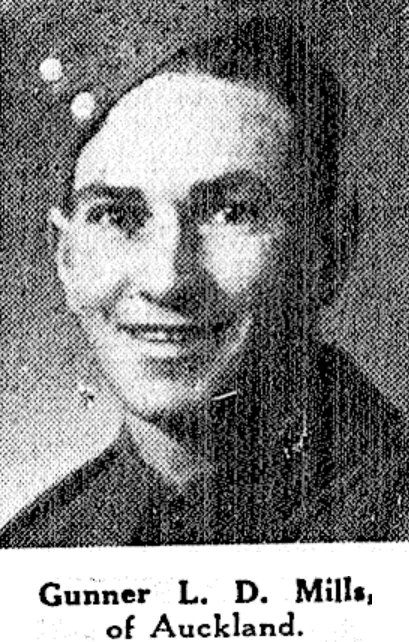

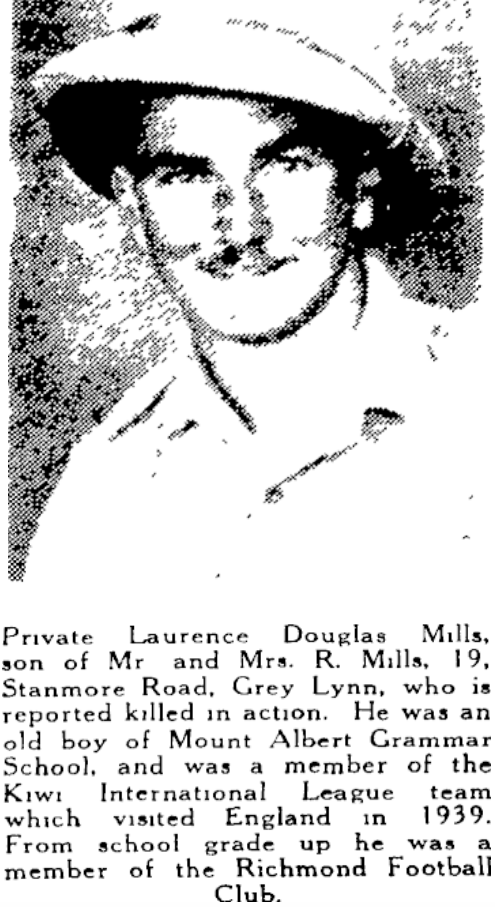

Mills did not depart for war until late in 1940 however he had enlisted several months earlier. He was part of a large group of men who enlisted for service in the Second New Zealand Expeditionary Force around early May. It was reported that the (several hundred) men were being posted “to various arms of the service in the Third Echelon, reinforcements, Training Battalion and training Regiment, and will be proceeding to Papakura, Trentham and Burnham mobilisation camps”. Mills was going to the Papakura Camp as part of the 6th Field Regiment Artillery, coincidentally his Richmond team mate Trevor Bramley was also in the same group. They were training close to Auckland which meant many were able to continue playing sport in the weekends as the forces released soldiers for such a reason. They met at the Drill Hall on Rutland Street at 9am on Wednesday, 15 May to leave by train at 10:30am for Papakura.

He embarked on 27 August 1940. At the time his next of kin was stated as “Mrs Irene Mills (mother), 19 Stanmore Road, Grey Lynn, Auckland, New Zealand”. With his rank being “gunner” and his service number 24646. His unit was New Zealand Artillery, 6 Field Regiment. On 21 June 1941 a short piece in the Auckland Star appeared which was titled “Richmond Players Overseas”. It said “three prominent rugby league players, members of the Richmond club, L.D. Mills, T. Bramley, and J Vernall, are reported safe back in the Middle East after participating in the Greece and Crete campaigns. It was a remarkable coincidence that Mills and Bramley met on the same transport in the hurried evacuation after being separated for some weeks. Mills went home to England with the New Zealand Kiwi team in 1939 and a promising career as a wing three-quarter was predicted for him. Bramley played in several Army games in Cairo and is the proud possessor of the General Freyberg Medal won by a New Zealand unit. The medal is actually in Auckland. Both Vernall and Bramley played at fullback for Richmond a few seasons ago”.

Mills was killed in action in Libya on 1 December 1941. His death was reported on 10 January 1942 in the Auckland Star. It stated “private Laurence Douglas Mills, reported killed in action, was a member of the Kiwi international league team which visited England in 1939. Son of Mrs. I. Mills, Grey Lynn. He was educated at Mount Albert Grammar School. He was a member of the Richmond football club from the school grade up”. Six days later the same newspaper posted a photograph of Mills along with a caption which included similar information. The New Zealand Herald had a similar notice in their 19 January edition.

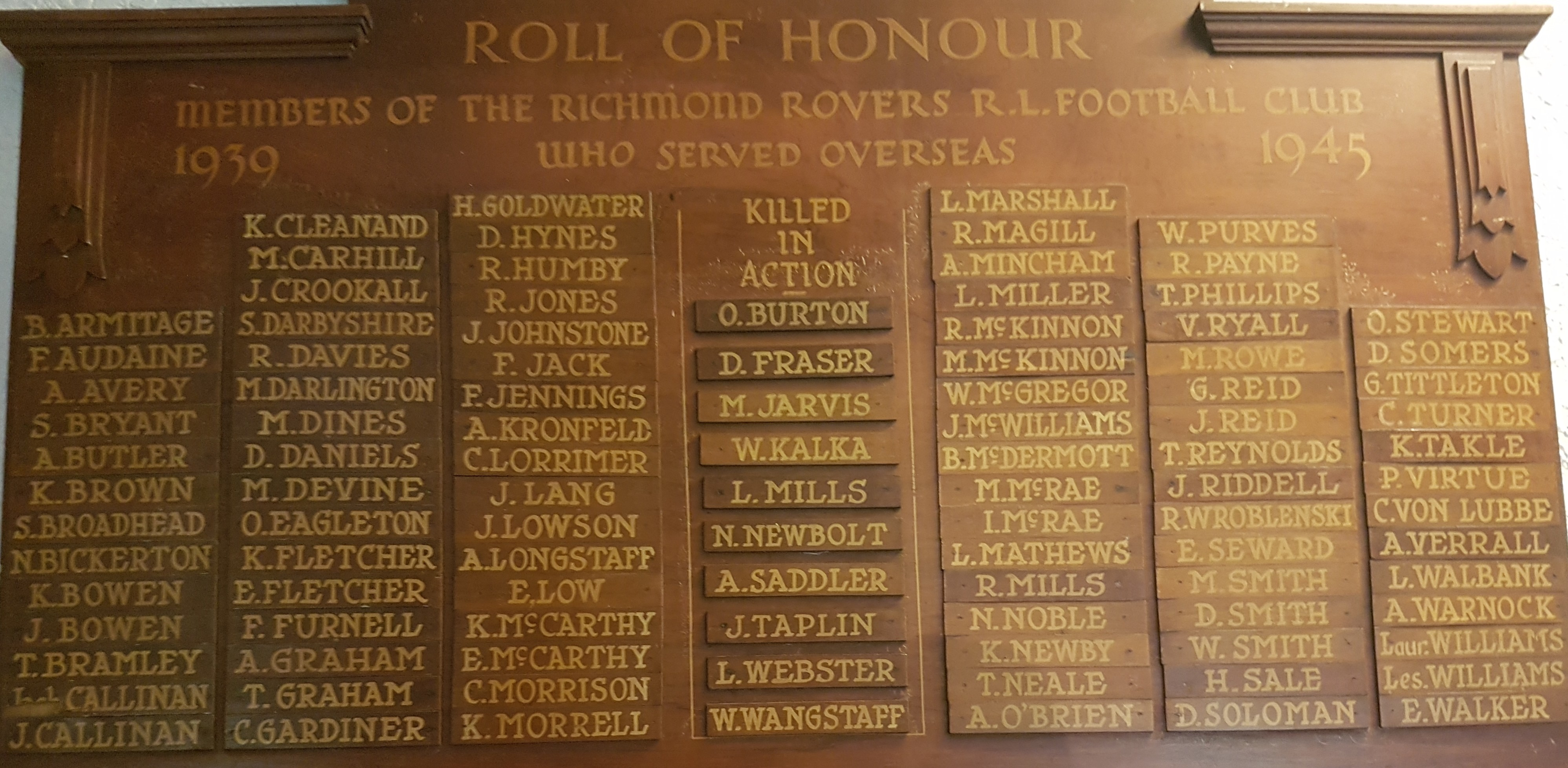
The war honour board in the Richmond club room in Grey Lynn featuring Laurie Mills name in the centre of those who were killed in action.

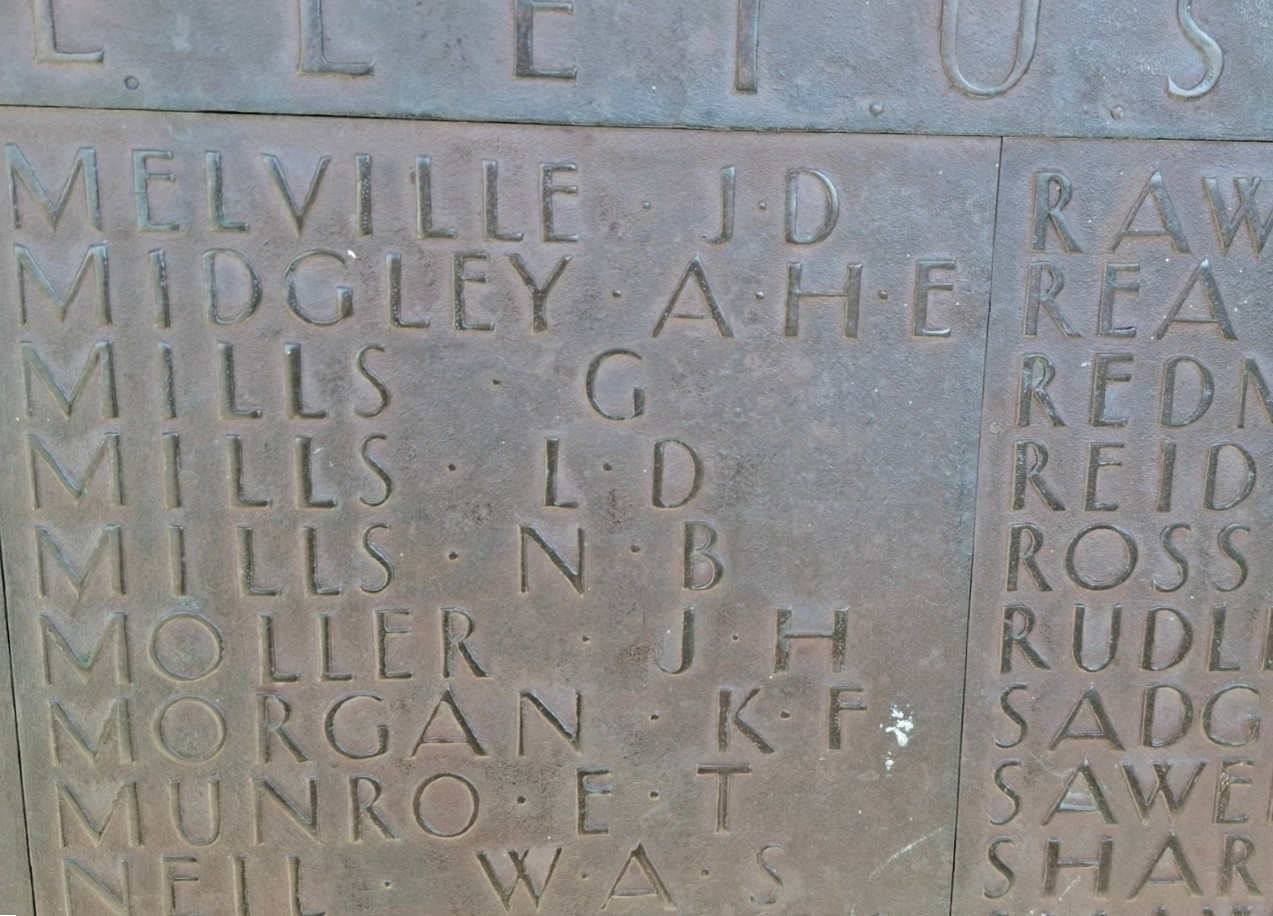
Laurie Mills name at the Mount Albert Grammar School war memorial wall (L.D. Mills).

On 13 January the Herald published a longer piece which said “gunner Laurence D. Mills, who has been reported killed in action, is well known in rugby league circles. He graduated from the Richmond schoolboy’s team though the Richmond club’s various grades to seniors and then on to the Auckland representative side. He displayed such brilliant form as a wing three-quarter that he was selected at the age of 20 years for the New Zealand team to tour England in 1939. This tour was abandoned after the playing of the first couple of matches. Gunner Mills left with the Third Echelon, and his only brother, Ray, departed with an earlier draft”. A year after his death notices were published in the Auckland Star by his parents and brother (still overseas), and by friends Mavis and Charlie. The notice from his parents mentioned that he had died in Libya.

Laurie Mills was aged 23 at the time of his death. He is commemorated at the Alamein Memorial, Column 100 in Egypt. He is also memorialised on the Richmond Rovers clubroom wall in a board honouring their members who fought in World War 2, and the Mount Albert Grammar War Memorial wall next to the sporting fields.
