= 1955 France rugby league tour of Australia and New Zealand =

The 1955 French rugby league tour of Australia and New Zealand was a tour where the France national rugby league team who played 33 matches in total in both Australia and New Zealand.

France won the Test series against Australia 2 to 1. The Test series between France and New Zealand was tied 1 to 1.

== Matches ==
15 May 1955
3:15pm

Western Australia	6–31	France
	Report

Belmont Oval, Perth
Attendance: 15,000
Referee: Roger Utting

18 May 1955
8:20pm

South Australia	10–48	France
	Report

Norwood Oval, Adelaide
Attendance: 1,074
Referee: A. Burns

21 May 1955
3:00pm

Victoria (Victoria (state))	2–44	France
	Report

Richmond Oval, Melbourne
Attendance: 2,311
Referee: T. O'Connor

25 May 1955
3:15pm

Monaro	11–3	France
	Report

Manuka Oval, Canberra
Attendance: 4,000
Referee: Harold Gillard

28 May 1955
3:00pm

Sydney	25–0	France
	Report

Sydney Cricket Ground, Sydney
Attendance: 39,445
Referee: Jack O'Brien

1 June 1955
3:00pm

Riverina	29–27	France
	Report

Narrandera Sports Ground, Riverina
Attendance: 10,000
Referee: Jerry Lane

4 June 1955
3:00pm

New South Wales	29–24	France
	Report

Sydney Cricket Ground, Sydney
Attendance: 50,488
Referee: Darcy Lawler

5 June 1955
3:00pm

Southern Division	16–9	France
	Report

Wollongong Showground, Wollongong
Attendance: 6,500
Referee: Eric McIlhatton

First Test

11 June 1955
3:00pm

Australia	20–8	France
	Report

Sydney Cricket Ground, Sydney
Attendance: 67,748
Referee: Darcy Lawler

13 June 1955
8:00pm

Brisbane	11–21	France
	Report

Brisbane Exhibition Ground, Brisbane
Attendance: 30,000
Referee: Jack Casey

15 June 1955
3:00pm

Toowoomba	35–6	France
	Report

Toowoomba Sports Ground, Toowoomba
Attendance: 7,305
Referee: Col Wright

18 June 1955
3:00pm

Queensland	17–23	France
	Report

The Gabba, Brisbane
Attendance: 14,871
Referee: Jack Casey

19 June 1955
3:30pm

Central Queensland	24–40	France
	Report

Rockhampton Showground, Rockhampton
Attendance: 7,500
Referee: Phil Mahoney

21 June 1955
3:15pm

Central West Queensland	14–29	France
	Report

Barcaldine Sports Ground, Barcaldine
Attendance: 2,250
Referee: Phil Mahoney

25 June 1955
3:00pm

Far North Queensland	21–66	France
	Report

Parramatta Park, Cairns
Attendance: 5,943
Referee: Hugh Gilbert

26 June 1955
3:00pm

North Queensland	26–42	France
	Report

Townsville Sports Reserve, Townsville
Attendance: 7,525
Referee: Hugh Gilbert

29 June 1955

Northern New South Wales	18–17	France
	Report

Queen Elizabeth Park, Casino
Attendance: 4,500
Referee: Jerry Lane

Second Test

2 July 1955
2:45pm

Australia	28–29	France
	Report

The Gabba, Brisbane
Attendance: 45,745
Referee: Darcy Lawler

3 July 1955

Wide Bay	17–46	France
	Report

Albert Park, Gympie
Attendance: 5,391
Referee: Tom Hempenstall

5 June 1955
3:30pm

Ipswich	20–10	France
	Report

North Ipswich Reserve, Ipswich
Attendance: 4,242
Referee: Neville Kelly

9 July 1955
2:45pm

Newcastle	17–15	France
	Report

Newcastle Sports Ground, Newcastle
Attendance: 20,824
Referee: Eric McIlhatton

13 July 1955
3:15pm

Sydney Colts	26–28	France
	Report

Sydney Cricket Ground, Sydney
Attendance: 13,282
Referee: Darcy Lawler

16 July 1955
3:00pm

New South Wales	37–23	France
	Report

Sydney Cricket Ground, Sydney
Attendance: 30,769
Referee: Jack O'Brien

20 July 1955
3:30pm

Western New South Wales	8–11	France
	Report

Spicer Park, Parkes
Attendance: 8,306
Referee: F. Ring

Third Test

23 July 1955
2:30pm

Australia	5–8	France
	Report

Sydney Cricket Ground, Sydney
Attendance: 62,458
Referee: Jack Casey

27 July 1955

West Coast	12–18	France
	Report

Wingham Park, Greymouth
Attendance: 5,000
Referee: Jim Griffin

30 July 1955

Canterbury	24–12	France
	Report

Lancaster Park, Christchurch
Attendance: 2,200
Referee: R. Aynsley

2 August 1955

Wellington	14–19	France
	Report

Basin Reserve, Wellington
Attendance: 4,000

4 August 1955

Taranaki	17–46	France
	Report

Pukekura Park, New Plymouth
Attendance: 4,500

First Test

6 August 1955

New Zealand	9–19	France
	Report

Carlaw Park, Auckland
Attendance: 20,500
Referee: Greg Kelly

10 August 1955

New Zealand Māori	28–20	France
	Report

Davies Park, Huntly

Second Test

13 August 1955

New Zealand	11–6	France
	Report

Carlaw Park, Auckland
Attendance: 12,000
Referee: Greg Kelly

15 August 1955

Auckland	17–15	France
	Report

Carlaw Park, Auckland
Attendance: 15,000
Referee: Roland Avery
