= 1960 France rugby league tour of Australia and New Zealand =

The 1960 French rugby league tour of Australia and New Zealand was a tour where the France national rugby league team who played 30 matches in total in both Australia and New Zealand.

The Test series between France and Australia was tied 1 to 1. France lost the Test series against New Zealand 2 to 0. The second test in Auckland was marred by unruly behaviour by several aggrieved French players who assaulted referee Vic Belsham and a linesman after disputing a second half penalty. Police investigated the incident. Two French players, André Vadon and Alain Perducat, were named and disciplined by rugby league authorities for striking the referee.

== Matches ==
14 May 1960

Northern Territory	14–42	France
	Report

Gardens Oval, Darwin
Attendance: 1,400
Referee: R. Irvine

14 May 1960

Western Australia	8–29	France
	Report

Belmont Oval, Perth
Attendance: 4,538
Referee: D. Coheen

These two games were played on the same day by two different cohorts of the touring squad.

18 May 1960

Monaro	17–25	France
	Report

Manuka Oval, Canberra
Attendance: 3,000
Referee: Jack Jewell

21 May 1960

Newcastle	10–14	France
	Report

Newcastle Sports Ground, Newcastle
Attendance: 15,096
Referee: Jack Jewell

22 May 1960

North Coast	28–23	France
	Report

Kempsey Park, Kempsey
Attendance: 6,500
Referee: Ken Barwick

25 May 1960

Riverina	14–25	France
	Report

Bolton Park, Wagga Wagga
Attendance: 11,000
Referee: A. Grew

28 May 1960
3:00pm

Sydney	23–17	France
	Report

Sydney Cricket Ground, Sydney
Attendance: 41,808
Referee: Darcy Lawler

29 May 1960

Southern Division	35–10	France
	Report

Wollongong Showground, Wollongong
Attendance: 9,038
Referee: Keith Lyons

1 June 1960

Western Division	14–7	France
	Report

Apex Oval, Dubbo
Attendance: 5,466
Referee: Ron Curtin

4 June 1960
3:01pm

New South Wales	25–7	France
	Report

Sydney Cricket Ground, Sydney
Attendance: 32,488
Referee: Col Pearce

First Test

11 June 1960
2:30pm

Australia	8–8	France
	Report

Sydney Cricket Ground, Sydney
Attendance: 49,868
Referee: Col Pearce

13 June 1960
8:00pm

Brisbane	15–12	France
	Report

Brisbane Exhibition Ground, Brisbane
Attendance: 17,425
Referee: Jack Purtell

18 June 1960

Queensland	30–18	France
	Report

Lang Park, Brisbane
Attendance: 22,533
Referee: Jack Casey

19 June 1960

Wide Bay	10–33	France
	Report

Maryborough Showgrounds, Maryborough
Attendance: 3,982
Referee: Hugh Gilbert

22 June 1960

Central Queensland	8–13	France
	Report

Browne Park, Rockhampton
Attendance: 4,000
Referee: Jack Casey

25 June 1960

Far North Queensland	15–26	France
	Report

Cazalys Oval, Cairns
Attendance: 4,329
Referee: William Gayler

26 June 1960

North Queensland	5–22	France
	Report

Townsville Sports Reserve, Townsville
Attendance: 5,457
Referee: William Gayler

Second Test

2 July 1960
3:00pm

Australia	56–6	France
	Report

Brisbane Exhibition Ground, Brisbane
Attendance: 32,644
Referee: Darcy Lawler

6 July 1960

Ipswich	–	France
	Report

North Ipswich Reserve, Ipswich
Attendance: 9,818
Referee: Col Wright

9 July 1960

Toowoomba	21–21	France
	Report

Toowoomba Sports Ground, Toowoomba
Attendance: 9,818
Referee: Col Wright

10 July 1960

Northern Division	10–24	France
	Report

Armidale Sports Ground, Armidale
Attendance: 6,200
Referee: Noel Spohr

Third Test

16 July 1960
2:32pm

Australia	5–7	France
	Report

Sydney Cricket Ground, Sydney
Attendance: 29,127
Referee: Darcy Lawler

20 July 1960

Waikato	2–32	France
	Report

Davies Park, Huntly
Attendance: 3,071
Referee: Roland Avery

First Test

23 July 1960

New Zealand	9–2	France
	Report

Carlaw Park, Auckland
Attendance: 17,914
Referee: Vic Belsham

25 July 1960

Taranaki	21–30	France
	Report

Hawera Showground, Hawera
Attendance: 1,234
Referee: John Percival

27 July 1960

Wellington	3–41	France
	Report

Wellington Showgrounds, Wellington
Attendance: 1,701
Referee: Peter Yaxley

30 July 1960

Canterbury	8–15	France
	Report

Addington Showgrounds, Christchurch
Attendance: 7,529
Referee: Bill Mountford

31 July 1960

West Coast	5–29	France
	Report

Greymouth Recreation Ground, Greymouth
Attendance: 4,500
Referee: W. Pilcher

3 August 1960

New Zealand Māori	12–23	France
	Report

Rotorua International Stadium, Rotorua
Attendance: 5,044
Referee: H. Hobman

Second Test

6 August 1960

New Zealand	9–3	France
	Report

Carlaw Park, Auckland
Attendance: 14,007
Referee: Vic Belsham

8 August 1960

Auckland	14–5	France
	Report

Carlaw Park, Auckland
Attendance: 11,431
Referee: H. Hobman

== Finances ==
The New Zealand leg of the tour turned a profit which New Zealand Rugby League shared with the French team.

Date/s	Venue	Profit
20 July 1960	Davies Park, Huntly	£61 profit
25 July 1960	Hawera Showground, Hawera	£13 loss
27 July 1960	Wellington Showgrounds, Wellington	£25 loss
30 July 1960	Addington Showgrounds, Christchurch	£334 profit
31 July 1960	Greymouth Recreation Ground, Greymouth	£166 profit
3 August 1960	Rotorua International Stadium, Rotorua	£9 loss
23 July, 6, 8 August 1960	Carlaw Park, Auckland	£1800 profit
