= Sonny Whakarau =

NZ rugby league footballer

Personal information
- Born: 13 January 1966 (age 60) Whakatāne, New Zealand
- Height: 6 ft 0 in (1.83 m)
- Weight: 15 st 0 lb (95 kg)

Playing information
- Position: Hooker, Prop, Second-row
Club
Years	Team	Pld	T	G	FG	P
1990–91	Batley	25	1	0	0	4
1991–93	Bramley	44	12	0	0	48
1993–95	Doncaster RLFC	65	16	0	0	64
1995–96	Sheffield Eagles	8	2	0	0	8
1995–96	→ Wakefield Trinity (loan)	13	6	0	0	24
1996–97	Keighley Cougars	37	7	0	0	28
1997–98	Wakefield Trinity Wildcats	51	6	0	0	24
	Total	243	50	0	0	200
Representative
Years	Team	Pld	T	G	FG	P
19??–86	Manawatu
1986–91	Wellington
1996–04	New Zealand Māori

Sonny Whakarau (born 13 January 1966) is a New Zealand former professional rugby league footballer who played professionally in England and represented the New Zealand Māori.

== Playing career ==
A Manawatu representative, Whakarau moved south in 1986, joining the Upper Hutt Tigers and playing till the 1991 season in the Wellington Rugby League and becoming a Wellington representative.

Sonny first went to the UK in 1991 and played for Batley Rugby League club, he then got signed by Bramley Rugby League club by former Great Britain Rugby League coach Maurice Bamford and had two successful seasons there in 1992 and 1993, In the 1994/1995 English season Whakarau joined Doncaster and helped them win promotion to the First Division under the coaching of former Welsh and Great Britain hard man Tony Fisher. He played for the Sheffield Eagles in 1995/96 season. Whakarau represented New Zealand Māori at the 1996 Pacific Cup and then played in their defeats of Papua New Guinea and Great Britain the same year.

In 1996 he joined the Keighley Cougars. Later in the season he was loaned to the Wakefield Trinity. He played for the Wakefield Trinity (Wildcats) in 1998, and 1999.

Whakarau then returned home and played for the Levin Knights and Manawatu. In 2000 he was appointed the player-coach of the Manawatu team but handed the coaching reins over to former coach Paul Sixtus after one game. He was later appointed the Manawatu Rugby League development officer, in 2001.

In 2002 the Central Falcons were admitted to the Bartercard Cup and Whakarau became a regular in the side, playing close to 50 games over the next three seasons until his retirement from representative football at the end of the 2005 season.

In 2004 Whakarau played for the Levin Lions in the Western Alliance club competition. Whakarau was selected for New Zealand Māori as part of the 2004 Pacific Cup squad.
