= Rugby in the Czech Republic =

Rugby in the Czech Republic may refer to:

- Rugby league in the Czech Republic
- Rugby union in the Czech Republic
