= Adam Lile =

New Zealand international rugby league footballer

Personal information
- Born: 29 December 1885 Waitara, Taranaki, New Zealand
- Died: 4 September 1954 (aged 68) New Plymouth, New Zealand

Playing information
- Height: 5 ft 11 in (1.80 m)
- Weight: 89 kg (14 st 0 lb)

Rugby union
- Position: Back row
Club
Years	Team	Pld	T	G	FG	P
	Wellington

Rugby league
- Position: Loose forward
Representative
Years	Team	Pld	T	G	FG	P
1907–09	New Zealand	32(6)	9	0	0	27
1908	Wellington	2	0	0	0	0
1908	Taranaki	1	0	0	0	0

Adam "Addie" Lile (1885–1954) was a New Zealand rugby footballer who was part of the professional 1907–1908 New Zealand rugby tour of Great Britain.

== Early years ==
Originally from Taranaki, Lile enlisted in the Army for the South African War but was sent home from South Africa when it was discovered that he was only 15. Lile remained in the Army and became an Artillery man.

== Rugby union career ==
Lile played rugby union for the Oriental club in Wellington alongside Albert Baskiville and was a Wellington representative. Lile was widely regarded as being one of the top 30 players in the country during the 1907 season and he won North Island selection that year.

== Rugby league career ==
Lile was selected by Baskiville to be part of the professional All Blacks 1907-1908 tour of Australia and Great Britain. As a result, he received a life ban from the New Zealand Rugby Union. During the tour his background as a soldier proved useful as he often led the team in training drills. While on tour Lile played in three test matches and scored two tries in all tour games.

On his return from the tour Lile was instrumental to the foundation of the Taranaki Rugby League. The team met with immediate success and in the 1909 season defeated both Wellington and Auckland, despite both teams featuring many of his fellow tourists. Lile was the Taranaki player-coach in both the 1908 and 1909 seasons.

Lile was part of the 1909 New Zealand tour of Australia, playing in all three test matches.

== Legacy ==
Lile has a street named after him, Adam Lile Drive, in New Plymouth.

The Taranaki Rugby League club trophy is also named the "Lile Shield" in his honour.

In 2008 he was named in the Taranaki Rugby League Team of the Century.

== Personal life ==
Adam Lile was born in 1885, the son of Adam Lile (Lisle) and Eliza Dandy. He had 7 siblings. In 1910 he married Ida Alberta Fleet. They had two children, Joyce Ngaere Lile in 1911 and Addie Bernard Lile in 1914.
