= Fred White (rugby league) =

New Zealand international rugby league footballer

Personal information
- Full name: Alfred Raymond White
- Born: 30 May 1941 (age 84); Masterton, New Zealand

Playing information
- Position: Wing
Representative
Years	Team	Pld	T	G	FG	P
1969	Taranaki	4	11	0	0	33
1963	New Zealand

Fred White is a New Zealand former rugby league footballer who represented New Zealand. New Zealand toured Australia that year however White did not play in any of the three test matches.

In 2008 he was named in the Taranaki Rugby League Team of the Century.
