= Spes Spartans Catania =

Italian rugby league club

Club information
- Full name: Spes Spartans Catania Rugby a XIII
- Founded: 2010; 15 years ago

Current details
- Ground(s): CUS Catania – via Santa Sofia (c/o cittadella universitaria)
- Competition: Italian Rugby Football League

Spes Spartans Catania are an Italian rugby league team based in Catania, Sicily.

== History ==
They were formed in 2010 in the new Italian Rugby League Championship competition.
