= Lance Moir =

New Zealand international rugby league footballer

Personal information
- Full name: Lancelot Ernest Moir
- Born: 18 June 1886; New Zealand
- Died: 29 July 1962 (aged 76); Auckland, New Zealand

Playing information
- Position: Centre
Representative
Years	Team	Pld	T	G	FG	P
1909–12	Taranaki
1912	New Zealand	0	0	0	0	0

Lancelot Ernest Moir (18 June 1886 – 29 July 1962) was a New Zealand rugby league player who represented New Zealand in 1912. No test matches were played on that year's tour of Australia. In 2008 he was named in the Taranaki Rugby League Team of the Century.
