= Barry Harvey =

New Zealand rugby league footballer (born 1964)

Personal information
- Full name: Barry Kenneth Harvey
- Born: 23 August 1964 (age 61) New Zealand

Playing information
- Position: Hooker
Club
Years	Team	Pld	T	G	FG	P
19??–86	Western Suburbs NZ
1987–??	Randwick
	Total	0	0	0	0	0
Representative
Years	Team	Pld	T	G	FG	P
19??–86	Taranaki
1983–87	Central Districts	5
1986–89	New Zealand	3	0	0	0	0
1987–92	Wellington	38
1988–90	New Zealand Māori

Barry Kenneth Harvey (born 1964) is a New Zealand former rugby league footballer who had represented New Zealand in three test matches, including matches that counted towards the 1988 World Cup.

== Playing career ==
A 1983 Junior Kiwi, Harvey played for the Western Suburbs club in the Taranaki Rugby League and became a Taranaki and Central Districts representative.

He was first picked for the New Zealand national rugby league team for the 1986 tour of Australia. In 1987 he moved south, joining the Randwick Kingfishers in the Wellington Rugby League. He became a Wellington representative, and later captained the side. New Zealand did not play any test matches in 1987, however, Harvey was selected in a New Zealand XIII that lost 14-18 to Queensland.

Harvey captained the New Zealand Māori team in the 1988 Pacific Cup. He was again picked for the New Zealand side in 1989 and played one test match against Australia.

== Legacy ==
In 2008 he was named in the Taranaki Rugby League Team of the Century.
