= James Parker (rugby league) =

New Zealand rugby league footballer

Personal information
- Born: New Zealand

Playing information
- Position: Prop
Club
Years	Team	Pld	T	G	FG	P
1912	Petone
1914	New Plymouth
	Total	0	0	0	0	0
Representative
Years	Team	Pld	T	G	FG	P
1913	Wellington
1914	Taranaki
1914–19	New Zealand	1	0	0	0	0

James Parker was a New Zealand rugby league footballer who represented New Zealand.

== Playing career ==
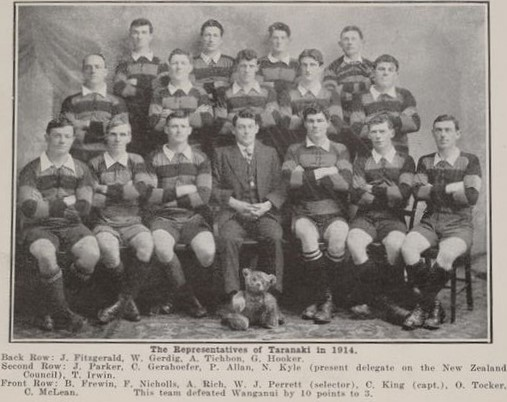
Parker, in the middle row on the left of the 1914 Taranaki representative rugby league team.

Parker played for New Zealand against the 1914 touring Great Britain Lions before going on the 1919 tour of Australia where no test matches were played.

In 2008 he was named in the Taranaki Rugby League Team of the Century.
