= Willie Southorn =

New Zealand international rugby league footballer

Personal information
- Full name: William Peter Southorn
- Born: 31 March 1944; New Zealand
- Died: 31 October 1993 (aged 49)

Playing information
- Position: Wing
Representative
| Years | Team | Pld | T | G | FG | P |
|---|---|---|---|---|---|---|
| 1959 | Taranaki |
| | New Zealand Māori |
| 1966–67 | New Zealand | 2 | 0 | 0 | 0 | 0 |

Willie Southorn is a New Zealand rugby league player who represented New Zealand.

== Playing career ==
Southorn played for Taranaki and the New Zealand Māori side.

In 1966 and 1967 Southorn played two test matches for the New Zealand national rugby league team.

== Legacy ==
In 2008 he was named in the Taranaki Rugby League Team of the Century.
