= Czech Rugby League Association =

Sports governing body in the Czech Republic

- Česká Asociace Rugby League
- Founded: 4 October 2005
- IRL affiliation: 2011
- Responsibility: Czech Republic
- Key people: Lukáš Hergott (Chair)
- Website: rugbyleague.cz

(Czech Republic)

The Czech Rugby League Association (Czech: Česká Asociace Rugby League) is the governing body for the sport of rugby league football in Czech Republic. The Association was formed during 4 October 2005. In 2011, the Czech Rugby League Association was admitted to affiliate membership of the Rugby League European Federation after reforming its governance.

In January 2024 the association was formally recognised by the Czech National Sports Agency.

== See also ==
- Rugby league in the Czech Republic
- Czech Republic national rugby league team
