= I Magnifici Firenze =

Italian rugby league team

I'Magnifici Firenze (The Firenze Magnificents)

Club information
- Full name: I Magnifici Firenze Rugby League
- Nickname: Magnifici or Magnificants
- Founded: 2010; 16 years ago

Current details
- Ground: Impianto sportivo “Padovani” viale Pasquale Paoli, 21 50137 Firenze
- CEO: Luigi Ferraro
- Competition: Italian Rugby League Championship

I'Magnifici Firenze are an Italian rugby league team in the Italia Rugby Football League.

== History ==
They were formed in 2010 in the new Italian Rugby League Championship competition.
