= Cliff Hunt =

New Zealand rugby league player

Personal information
- Full name: Charles Clifford Hunt
- Born: 31 December 1909 New Zealand
- Died: Unknown

Playing information
- Position: Fullback, Centre
Club
Years	Team	Pld	T	G	FG	P
1933	Inglewood (TRL)
Representative
Years	Team	Pld	T	G	FG	P
1933	Taranaki	2	1	0	0	3
1934	North Island	1	0	0	0	0
1935	New Zealand	2	2	0	0	6

Charles Clifford Hunt was a New Zealand rugby league player who represented New Zealand.

== Playing career ==
Hunt played for Taranaki and in 1935 was selected to represent New Zealand against Australia. He played in the second and third Test matches in the series, scoring two tries.

In 2008 he was named in the Taranaki Rugby League Team of the Century.
