= Gladiators Roma =

Italian rugby league club

Club information
- Full name: Gladiators Roma Rugby a XIII
- Founded: 2010; 15 years ago

Current details
- Competition: Italian Rugby Football League

Gladiators Roma are an Italian rugby league team in the Italia Rugby Football League.

== History ==
They were formed in 2010 in the new Italian Rugby League Championship competition.
