= Gordon Hooker =

New Zealand rugby league footballer

Personal information
- Born: 29 May 1887; New Plymouth, New Zealand
- Died: 6 December 1967 (aged 80); New Plymouth, New Zealand

Playing information
- Position: Wing
Representative
Years	Team	Pld	T	G	FG	P
1908–??	Taranaki
1909	New Zealand	2	0	0	0	0
1910	Queensland

Gordon Hooker (29 May 1887 – 6 December 1967) was a New Zealand rugby league player who represented New Zealand in 1909.

== Playing career ==
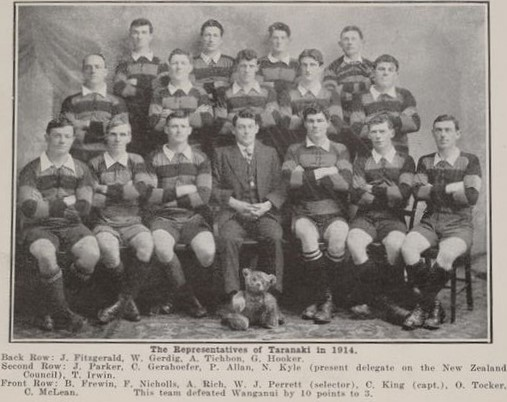
Hooker in the backrow on the right of the 1914 Taranaki representative side.

Hooker represented Taranaki in 1908 and was selected to tour Australia for New Zealand in 1909, where he played in two Test matches.

He represented Queensland against the 1910 Great Britain Lions before returning to New Zealand and playing for Taranaki against the 1914 Lions. He played until he was 36. He refereed the August 5, 1933 match between Auckland and Taranaki at Western Park.

In the 1930s Hooker helped re-establish rugby league in Taranaki. He died in 1967 and his ashes were buried at Te Henui Cemetery.

== Legacy ==
In 2008 he was named in the Taranaki Rugby League Team of the Century.
