= Taranaki Rugby League =

Regional sporting body in New Zealand

Club information
- Nickname(s): Sharks; Wildcats; Rockets

Current details
- Ground: Pukekura Park

Taranaki Rugby League is the local sporting body responsible for the administration of Rugby league in the Taranaki region of New Zealand. The TRL are represented by the Taranaki rugby league team. They are in the Mid-Central zone along with the Manawatu Rugby League.

== Regional senior competition ==
Five Taranaki senior clubs compete in the Western Alliance, alongside five clubs from the Manawatū-Whanganui region. Taranaki clubs in the Western Alliance include:

- Bell Block Marist Dragons
- Coastal Cobras
- Hawera Hawks
- Normanby/Okaiawa Knights
- Waitara Bears
- Western Suburb Tigers

== History ==
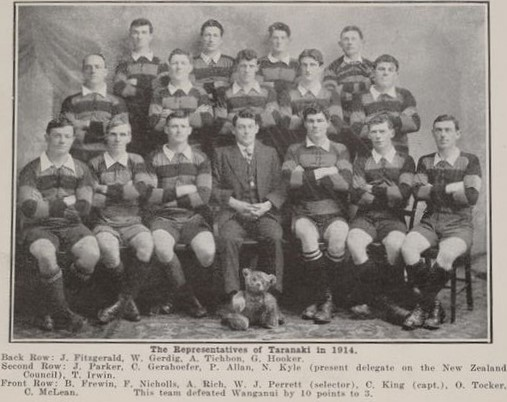
The Taranaki representative team of 1914 featuring New Zealand players James Parker and Gordon Hooker.

The Taranaki Rugby League was founded with the help of Adam Lile, one of the members of the 1907-1908 "All Golds" tour.

In 2008 the Taranaki Rugby League named its Team of the Century: Dave Watson; Babe Hooker; Ron McKay; Willie Talau; Ernest Buckland; Tony Kemp; Issac Luke; Bruce Gall; Howie Tamati; Wille Southorn; Graeme West; Adam Lile; Barry Harvey. Bench: Jack McLeod; Fred White; Lance Moir; Jim Parker; Charles Hunt.

Referee of the century: Graham Church. Coach of the century: Alan Marshall. Player of the century: Wille Southorn.

=== Lion Red Cup ===
Between 1994 and 1996, the Taranaki region was represented by the Taranaki Rockets in the Lion Red Cup competition. The Rockets were notable for having Willie Talau, John Farrar on their roster, both players played for their Club Western Tigers Wille who now competes in the Super League with St. Helens.and John Farrar who was selected and played for the New Zealand Maori Rugby league team against Great Britain and Papua New Guine.

Season	Pld	W	D	L	PF	PA	PD	Pts	Position	Finals
1994	22	10	1	11	481	536	-55	21	Sixth	N/A
1995	22	2	1	19	339	770	-431	5	Eleventh	N/A
1996	22	11	0	11	516	438	33	22	Seventh	N/A

=== Bartercard Cup ===
Taranaki was represented in the Bartercard Cup competition for two years by the Taranaki Wildcats. They finished in last place both seasons, before folding at the completion of the 2003 season.

Season	Pld	W	D	L	PF	PA	PD	Pts	Position (Teams)	Finals
2002	16	2	2	12	334	636	-302	6	Wooden Spoon (Twelve)	N/A
2003	16	1	0	15	262	932	-670	2	Wooden Spoon (Twelve)	N/A

=== National provincial competition ===
Taranaki Rugby League were awarded a place in the new six-team National Provincial Competition which began in 2008. In the first season the team finished in sixth place.

Season	Pld	W	D	L	PF	PA	PD	Pts	Position	Finals
2008	5	0	0	5	96	262	-116	0	Sixth	N/A
2009	5	1	0	4	86	212	-126	2	Fifth	N/A
