= Italia Rugby Football League =

Rugby league competition

- Federazione Italiana Rugby Football League (FIRFL)
- Sport: Rugby league
- Founded: 2010
- First season: 2010
- CEO: Davide Massitti
- Country: Italy
- Most recent champion: Gladiators Roma

The r-Evolution League as managed by the Federazione Italiana Rugby Football League (FIRFL) is a national amateur rugby league competition in Italy that began on June 19, 2010. The competition has attracted a number professional and semi-professional rugby union players from Italy.

The Italia RFL is a breakaway competition managed by the 'Federazione Italiana Rugby Football League' due to a split caused by the disagreement toward the management of the governing body 'Federazione Italiana Rugby League', which is based in the North of Italy. The original teams of Gladiators Roma (Italia RFL 2010 and Central-Southern Italia Rugby League Champions), I Magnifici Firenze and Spes Spartans Catania, along with 2 former Federation members choose to form the new competition, announced just before the 3rd and final round of the 2010 Italian Rugby League Championship, before separate finals were played.

The original Italia Northern Conference teams: XIII Del Ducato Piacenza (2010 Northern Italia Champions), Griffons Padova and Leoni Veneti choose to finish their seasons and not compete in the 'iRFLeague' Gran Finale Day, due to encompassing FIRL members.

== r-Evolution League Gran Finale ==
The iRFLeague Gran Finale, as it was called in 2010 is now named the r-Evolution League.

=== 2010: Gran Finale ===
The Gladiators Roma were the inaugural iRFLeague Champions in 2010. Their opposition in the Grand Final was the I Magnifici Firenze at the Campo dell'Unione Capitolina in Rome on July 18, 2010. The final score was Gladiators Roma 36 to 22 I Magnifici Firenze.

The Spes Spartans Catania fielded a team determined to bring home third place in the 'iRFLeague Championship' and managed to control the debutants of Arvalia Villa Pamphili Rugby Roma for much of the match. But on the final parts of the match, the Arvalia Villa Pamphili Rugby Roma put a little 'more order among their ranks' and were rescued by providing good evidence and finally managed to finish the good deeds, which ended with the conversions that had softened the final result of 42 - 14 for Spes Spartans Catania.

Exhibition Match Spes Spartans Catania vs Arvalia Villa Pamphili Rugby Roma at 3pm | Gran-Finale Gladiators Roma vs I Magnifici Firenze at 5pm

The 2010 iRFleague Gran Finale Day happened two weeks after the split, with 'Central-Southern Italia Rugby League' Conference Leaders Gladiators Roma playing second placed I Magnifici Firenze for the right to be called 'Campioni di Italia Rugby a XIII' for the 'Campionato Italia Rugby League' with the iRFL. Spes Spartans Catania based on the island of Sicily who finished third in the Central-South Conference played a newly invited Serie C Rugby club Arvalia Villa Pamphili Rugby Roma for the third place in the 'iRFLeague' finals, played as a pre-match before the iRFLeague Gran Finali.

The Grand Final appointment saw the strong rivals of Gladiators Roma play against I Magnifici Firenze for the end of the Grand Final of the 1st-2nd placed teams, while the Spes Spartans Catania challenged the men of Arvalia Villa Pamphili Rugby Roma, after the new team had accepted the invitation to participate in the 2010 'iRFLeague'.

== See also ==
- Rugby league in Italy
- Italy national rugby league team
- Italy women's national rugby league team
