= Taranaki rugby league team =

Club information
- Nickname(s): Wildcats, Rockets, Sharks
- Colours: Black, white, yellow
- Founded: 1908

Current details
- Grounds: Yarrow Stadium, New Plymouth; Pukekura Park, New Plymouth
- Coach: Stacey Lamb
- Competition: NZRL National Competition (Zone); Rugby League Cup (District)

Records
- Rugby League Cup: 1975, 1977–79, 1985, 1999–2000

The Taranaki rugby league team (also known as the Taranaki Wildcats, formerly the Taranaki Sharks and the Taranaki Rockets) are New Zealand rugby league team that represents the Taranaki Rugby League. They currently compete in the NZRL National Competition (Zonal team) and the Rugby League Cup (District team).

== History ==
=== 1908–1993 ===
Taranaki competed in the first season of provincial rugby league in New Zealand. They shared a two match series with Auckland 1-all. Taranaki was led by New Zealand international Adam Lile.

In 2008 the Taranaki Rugby League named its Team of the Century: Dave Watson; Babe Hooker; Ron McKay; Willie Talau; Ernest Buckland; Tony Kemp; Issac Luke; Bruce Gall; Howie Tamati; Wille Southorn; Graeme West; Adam Lile; Barry Harvey. Bench: Jack McLeod; Fred White; Lance Moir; Jim Parker; Charles Hunt.

=== 1994–1996: Lion Red Cup ===
As the Taranaki Rockets, Taranaki competed in the Lion Red Cup between 1994 and 1996. They were coached by Teri Tamati, Allan Marshall and Howard Tamati over the three years of the competition.

The team was originally going to be called the Taranaki Energisers but this name was vetoed by Eveready Batteries who owned the name in New Zealand.

==== Season results ====
Season	Pld	W	D	L	PF	PA	PD	Pts	Position	Finals
1994	22	10	1	11	481	536	−55	21	Sixth	N/A
1995	22	2	1	19	339	770	−431	5	Eleventh	N/A
1996	22	11	0	11	516	438	33	22	Seventh	N/A

=== 1997–2002 ===
In 1997 the Taranaki Rugby League side that competed in the Super League Challenge Cup was also called the Rockets.

They adopted the Sharks nickname in 1998 after a public competition. Notable players included Paul Rauhihi, Iva Ropati and Artie Shead.

=== 2002–2003: Bartercard Cup ===
In 2002 and 2003 the Taranaki Wildcats competed in the Bartercard Cup. They were coached by Alan Jackson.

==== Season results ====
Season	Pos	Pld	W	D	L	PF	PA	PD	Pts
2002	Wooden Spoon	16	2	2	12	334	636	−302	6
2003	Wooden Spoon	16	1	0	15	262	932	−670	2

The Wildcats entered the competition in 2002 alongside the Central Falcons. They managed to compete in most games, winning two and with two draws. This was not enough to avoid the wooden spoon but most pundits predicted they would be better for the experience in 2003.

In 2003 they again collected the wooden spoon, only managing to win one game all season.

=== 2008–2009: Bartercard Premiership ===
Taranaki were part of the Bartercard Premiership in 2008 and 2009, however they were not competitive and finished last and second to last in each year.

Season	Pld	W	D	L	PF	PA	PD	Pts	Position	Finals
2008	5	0	0	5	96	262	−116	0	Sixth	N/A
2009	5	1	0	4	86	212	−126	2	Fifth	N/A

=== 2010–present: National Competition ===
In 2010, they joined the NZRL National Competition from the defunct Bartercard Premiership.

== Notable players ==
The Taranaki team of the century was named in 2008 and included: 1. Dave Watson, 2. Babe Hooker, 3. Ron McKay, 4. Willie Talau, 5. Ernest Buckland, 6. Tony Kemp, 7. Issac Luke, 8. Bruce Gall, 9. Howie Tamati, 10. Willie Southorn, 11. Graeme West, 12. Adam Lile and 13. Barry Harvey. Bench: Jack McLeod, Fred White, Lance Moir, Jim Parker and 18. Charles Hunt. The coach was Alan Marshall and Graham Church was named as the referee of the century.

== Rugby League Tour Matches ==
Taranaki has also been a stop for touring international rugby league teams between 1912 and 1990. They played 15 games against various teams, though never once managed a victory.

Game	Date	Result	Venue	Attendance	Notes
1	29 August 1912	New South Wales def. Taranaki 24–0	Western Park, New Plymouth	1,000	1912 NSW Tour of New Zealand
2	27 August 1913	New South Wales def. Taranaki 16–5	Hāwera Showground, Hāwera	1,000	1913 NSW Tour of New Zealand
3	23 July 1914	(United Kingdom) Northern Union def. Taranaki 43–11	Taumata Park, Eltham	2,000	1914 Great Britain Lions tour
4	4 August 1936	England def. Taranaki 35–4	Pukekura Park, New Plymouth	3,000	1936 Great Britain Lions tour
5	11 August 1951	France def. Taranaki 23–7	Pukekura Park, New Plymouth	6,473	1951 French tour of Australasia
6	6 July 1953	Australia def. Taranaki 16–5	Pukekura Park, New Plymouth	1,950	1953 Kangaroo tour of New Zealand
7	4 August 1953	(United States) USA def. Taranaki 21–18	Pukekura Park, New Plymouth	3,000	1953 American All-Stars tour
8	4 August 1955	France def. Taranaki 46–17	Pukekura Park, New Plymouth	4,500	1955 French tour of Australasia
9	28 July 1958	(United Kingdom) Great Britain def. Taranaki 67–8	Pukekura Park, New Plymouth	1,200	1958 Great Britain Lions tour
10	25 July 1960	France def. Taranaki 21–30	Hāwera Showground, Hāwera	1,234	1960 French tour of Australasia
11	28 June 1961	Australia def. Taranaki 34–0	Burnside Showgrounds, Hāwera	600	1961 Kangaroo tour of New Zealand
12	5 August 1964	France def. Taranaki 22–4	Pukekura Park, New Plymouth	1,200	1964 French tour of Australasia
13	15 June 1965	Australia def. Taranaki 23–7	Pukekura Park, New Plymouth	6,473	1965 Kangaroo tour of New Zealand
14	15 August 1966	(United Kingdom) Great Britain def. Taranaki 51–17	Pukekura Park, New Plymouth	539	1966 Great Britain Lions tour
15	4 July 1990	(United Kingdom) Great Britain def. Taranaki 24–0	Pukekura Park, New Plymouth	2,000	1990 Great Britain Lions tour
