= Jack McLeod (rugby league) =

New Zealand international rugby league footballer

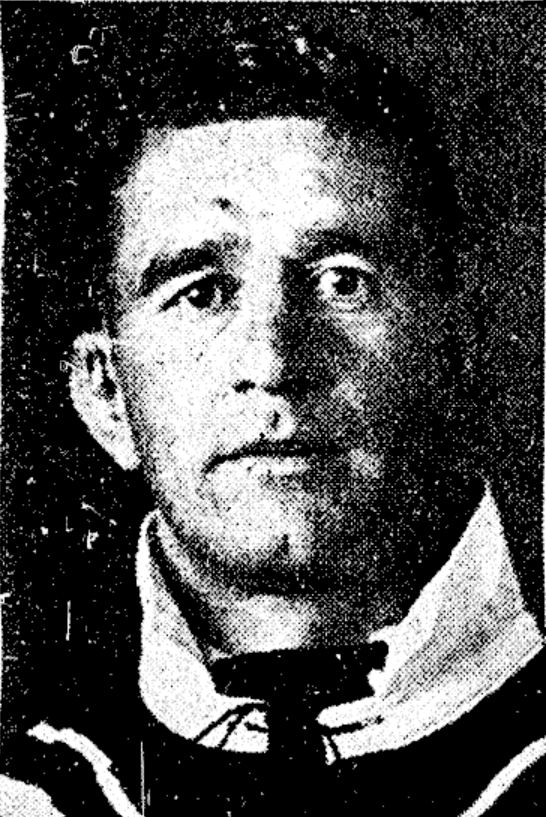

Personal information
- Full name: John McLeod
- Born: 18 March 1909 Opunake, Taranaki, New Zealand
- Died: Deceased

Playing information
- Weight: 12 st 12 lb (82 kg)

Rugby union
- Position: Centre, Wing
Club
Years	Team	Pld	T	G	FG	P
1930–32	Star (Taranaki)

Rugby league
- Position: Second-row, Loose forward
Club
Years	Team	Pld	T	G	FG	P
1933–36	Western Suburbs (TRL)	8	7	1	1	27
1933	Eastern Suburbs (preseason)	1	1	0	0	3
1937–40	Richmond Rovers	61	15	9	0	63
	Total	70	23	10	1	93
Representative
Years	Team	Pld	T	G	FG	P
1932–35	Taranaki	5	3	0	0	9
1934	North Island	1	0	0	0	0
1937–40	Auckland Māori	5	0	0	0	0
1937–39	New Zealand Trial	3	0	0	0	0
1937–38	New Zealand	8 (1)	4	0	0	12
1937	New Zealand Māori	2	1	0	0	3
1938	Auckland	1	0	0	0	0

Jack McLeod was a New Zealand rugby league footballer who represented New Zealand.

== Personal life ==
Jack McLeod was born on March 18, 1909. His parents were William Sutherland McLeod and Ada Rahunga (nee Peters) McLeod. He had several siblings and played with his older brother Jim (James) until his death in 1934. His great grandfather was Wiremu Kīngi Te Rangitāke.

== Playing career ==
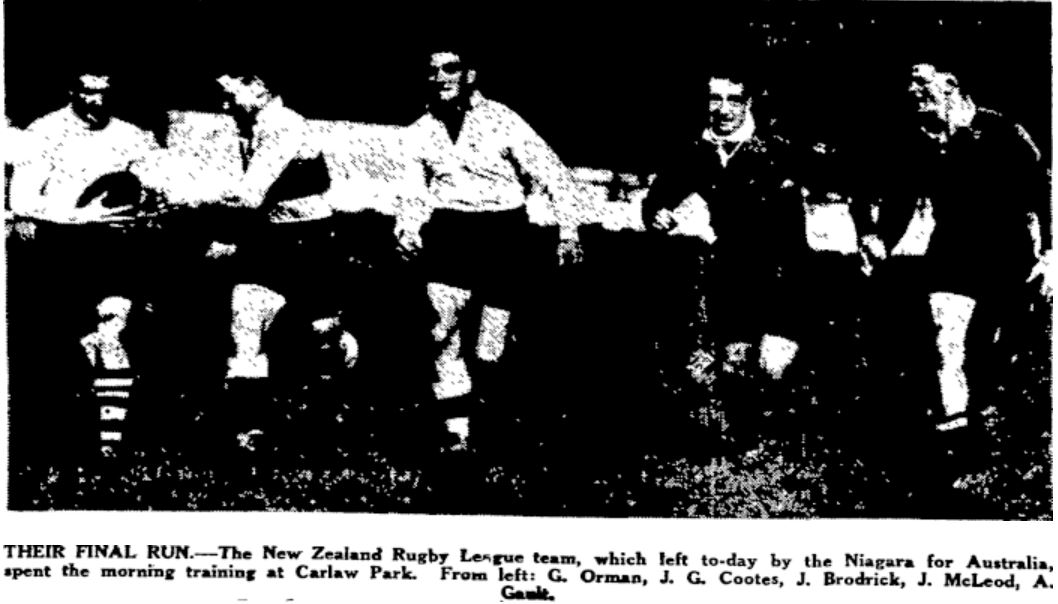
McLeod second from right, training with New Zealand at Carlaw Park before they departed for Australia in 1938.

McLeod played for Taranaki and Auckland. He was originally a rugby union player for the Star club in Taranaki but switched codes at the end of the 1932 season to join the Taranaki team which played the Marist Old Boys club side from Auckland which featured 6 New Zealand internationals at Pukekura Park. He transferred from Taranaki in 1937 and joined the Richmond Rovers club. While there McLeod was selected for the New Zealand national rugby league team in 1937, playing against Australia. Four days after the 1937 test, McLeod was part of the New Zealand Māori side that defeated Australia 16-5. He was surprisingly omitted from the second test team to Play Australia days after the New Zealand Māori win.

He toured Australia with New Zealand in 1938 however no test matches were played on the tour. He played in 7 of the 9 tour matches. The first at hooker against New South Wales, with the remainder in the second row. He then played for New Zealand in their match against Auckland following their return.

== Legacy ==
In 2008 he was named in the Taranaki Rugby League Team of the Century.
