= Darcy Lawler =

Australian rugby league referee

Darcy Thomas Elgan Lawler (1919–1994) was a NSWRFL Referee in the 1940s, 1950s and 1960s.

Darcy Lawler was a rugby league referee based in Sydney, Australia. A veteran of over 300 first class games, Lawler refereed at local, state and international level between 1944 and 1963.

His last match was the 1963 NSWRFL Grand Final.

He was later the secretary-manager of the Souths Juniors League Club for 27 years.

His son Ted played fullback in three 1st grade games for Souths in 1964.

Darcy Lawler died on 27 February 1994 after a short illness.
