= Rugby league in the Czech Republic =

Rugby league in the Czech Republic began in 2006. The Czech national team played their first game on August 5, 2006 in Prague, losing 34-28 to the Netherlands.

In 2007, the Czech Republic took part in the European Shield tournament. This tournament involved two other second-tier nations, Germany and Serbia. The Czechs lost 44-22 to Germany in Prague on August 4, and 56-16 to Serbia in Belgrade on August 18, and finished third.

In 2011, Czech rugby league's governing body, the Czech Rugby League Association (CZRLA), was given affiliate membership of the Rugby League European Federation.

In 2024, the state-run Národní sportovni agentura (Czech National Sports Agency) formally recognized CZRLA as a governing body.

Czech rugby league's top club competition is the 1. liga ("1st League"). The current 1. liga champions are Mad Squirrels Vrchlabí, who beat Orlí Havlíčkův Brod, 52-6, in the 2026 Grand Final.

== See also ==
- Czech Rugby League Association
- Czech Republic national rugby league team
