= Manawatu Rugby League =

Manawatu Rugby League was formed in 1957. They are currently part of the Mid-Central zone along with Taranaki Rugby League.

== Kiwi Players ==
Only one player from Manawatu has ever made the New Zealand national rugby league team. This was Kiwi number 456, Dick Uluave, who played two tests in 1979.

== National Competitions ==
In 1997 Manawatu had a team in the Lion Red Cup. This team was known as the Manawatu Mustangs.

Between 2002 and 2007 Manawatu Rugby League fielded a side in the national Bartercard Cup. This team was known as the Central Falcons. However Manawatu was not invited to field a side in 2008's new Bartercard Premiership.

== Club Competitions ==
The club senior competition folded in 2018 due to a lack of teams, and the remaining clubs competed in the Taranaki Rugby League instead. The competition was revived in 2021.

=== Premier Grade ===
- Feilding Stags
- Kia Ora Warriors
- Levin Wanderers
- Linton Cobras
- Takaro Taniwha
- Whanganui Boxon

== Western Alliance League ==
Western Alliance was created in 2003 when clubs from Taranaki, Wellington and Manawatu competed in a 12-team regional competition. However, in 2004 all Wellington clubs pulled out to work on their own local competition. In 2007 Kia Ora Warriors ended Waitara's two-year reign as Western Alliance champion with a resolute, 29-20 win in the grand final.

Teams that competed in the 2007 Western Alliance were:

- Waitara Bears
- Linton Cobras
- Feilding Falcons
- Coastal Cobras
- Marist Dragons
- Western Suburbs Tigers
- Kia Ora Warriors
- Hawera Hawks
- Taitoko United
- Castlecliff Seagulls
