= Roland Avery =

New Zealand rugby league referee

Personal information
- Full name: Roland Dreadon Avery
- Born: 15 June 1927
- Died: 21 May 2015 (aged 87); Huntly, New Zealand

Refereeing information
Years	Competition	Apps
1949–1962	International	8

Roland "Roly" Dreadon Avery (15 June 1927 – 21 May 2015) was a New Zealand rugby league referee.

== Referee career ==
Avery controlled his first two international test matches during Australia's 1949 tour of New Zealand. He went on to referee another three test matches involving Australia, one in 1953 and two in 1961, and two involving Great Britain, during their 1962 tour of New Zealand. As well as seven test matches, Avery also controlled a match between France and South Auckland during the 1951 French tour of New Zealand.

Avery died in Huntly on 21 May 2015, aged 87.
