= Ropati =

Ropati is a Polynesian name, and may refer to the following:

- Ropati Pitoitua (born 1985), American football player
- Le Mamea Ropati, Samoan politician
- Tea Ropati (born 1964), New Zealand former professional rugby league footballer
- Jerome Ropati (born 1984), New Zealand rugby league player
- Joe Ropati, New Zealand rugby league player
- Tangi Ropati (born 1984), New Zealand rugby league player
- Romi Ropati (born 1976), New Zealand rugby union player
- Iva Ropati, former professional rugby league footballer
- Peter Ropati, New Zealand rugby league player and commentator
