= 2020 Tahiti Championship D2 season =

2020 Tahiti Championship D2
- Countries: Tahiti
- Date: 25 July 2020 – 8 August 2020
- Matches played: 3
- Top point scorer: (France) Marc Amoretti (Moorea); 15 points
- Top try scorer: (France) Marc Amoretti (Moorea); 3 tries

Official website
- www.federationpolynesiennederugby.com/competitions/2020/resultats-2020/seniors-championnat-de-tahiti-a-xv-2020-d2-.html

The 2020 Tahiti Championship D2 is the second-level Tahitian rugby union club competition, behind the Tahiti Championship, for the 2020 season. It runs alongside the 2020 Tahiti Championship competition; both competitions are operated by the Fédération Polynésienne de Rugby (FPR).

Playing was suspended after the 2nd Matchday due to the COVID-19 pandemic in Tahiti. The season was officially suspended on 9 August

== Teams ==
Club	City	Stadium	Capacity	Previous season
Jeunesse Rugby Moorea	Paopao (Moorea-Maiao)	Stade de Pihaena	1,000	
Paea Manu Ura RC	Papeete, Paea	Stade Fautaua	10,000	Relegated from Tahiti Championship (5th)
AS Manu Ura	Papeete, Paea	Stade Fautaua	10,000	

== Number of teams by regions ==
All but one team this season are from Paea, a suburb of the Papeete Urban Area.

Teams	Region or island	Team(s)
2	Tahiti	Paea(AS Manu Ura), Paea(Manu Ura)
1	Mo'orea	Moorea

== Table ==
2020 Tahiti Championship D2 table
Pos	Team	Pld	W	D	L	PF	PA	PD	Pts	Result
1	Moorea	2	1	0	1	38	22	+16	6	Current league leader
2	Paea (Manu Ura RC)	1	1	0	0	22	19	+3	5	Second place
3	Paea (AS Manu Ura)	1	0	0	1	0	19	−19	1	Last place

Updated to match(es) played on unknown. Source:

There's no third division so teams face no relegation.
