= 2019 Tahiti Championship season =

2019 Tahiti Championship
- Countries: Tahiti
- Date: 19 September 2019 – 30 November 2019
- Champions: Pirae (7th Title)
- Runners-up: Arue
- Relegated: Paea
- Matches played: 23
- Top point scorer: (French Polynesia) Manahau Pautu (Pirae); 101 points
- Top try scorer: (French Polynesia) Yannick Mauahiti (Pirae); 13 tries

Official website
- www.federationpolynesiennederugby.com/competitions/2019/resultats-2019/seniors-championnat-de-tahiti-a-xv-2019.html

The 2019 Tahiti Championship competition was the 46th season of the Tahitian domestic rugby union club competition operated by the Fédération Polynésienne de Rugby (FPR).

== Teams ==
Club	City (commune)	Stadium	Capacity	Previous season
Arue	Papeete, Arue	Stade Fautaua	10,000	5th
Faʻaʻā	Papeete, Faʻaʻā	Stade Fautaua	10,000	Champions (1st in league)
Paea	Papeete, Paea	Stade Fautaua	10,000	Did not compete
Papeete	Papeete	Stade Fautaua	10,000	4th place (2nd in league)
Pirae	Papeete, Pirae	Stade Fautaua	10,000	Runners up (3rd in league)
Punaauia	Papeete, Punaauia	Stade Fautaua	10,000	3rd-place winners (4th in league)
Taravao	Taravao (Taiarapu-Est)	Taravao		6th

== Number of teams by regions ==
All but one team this season are from Papeete or suburbs of the Papeete Urban Area.

Teams	Region or island	Team(s)
7	Tahiti	Arue, Faʻaʻā, Paea, Papeete, Pirae, Punaauia and Taravao

== Competition format ==
The top four teams at the end of the regular season (after all the teams played one another once) enter a knockout stage to decide the Champions of Tahiti. This consists of two rounds. The semi-finals, with the losers meeting for 3rd place and with the winners meeting in the final at the Stade Fautaua in Pirae.

Tahiti's bonus point system operates as follows:

- 4 points for a win.
- 2 points for a draw.
- 1 point for a loss.
- No point for a forfeit.
- 1 bonus point for scoring at least 4 tries (or more).
- 1 bonus point for losing by 7 points (or fewer).

== Table ==
2019 Tahiti Championship Table
	Club	Played	Won	Drawn	Lost	Points For	Points Against	Points Diff.	Yellow Cards	Red Cards	Try Bonus	Losing Bonus	Points
1	Arue (VC)	6	5	0	1	168	44	+124	1	0	4	0	25
2	Pirae (C)	6	5	0	1	296	66	+230	2	1	5	0	25
3	Punaauia (SF)	6	4	0	2	147	87	+60	3	1	2	1	21
4	Papeete (SF)	6	3	0	3	156	108	+48	3	0	2	2	19
5	Paea (R)	6	2	0	4	106	205	-99	5	2	2	1	15
6	Faʻaʻā (DC)	6	2	0	4	82	151	-69	1	1	2	0	12
7	Taravao	6	0	0	6	38	332	-294	0	0	0	0	4
If teams are level at any stage, tiebreakers are applied in the following order: 1. Competition points earned in head-to-head matches 2. Points difference in head-to-head matches 3. Try differential in head-to-head matches 4. Points difference in all matches 5. Try differential in all matches 6. Points scored in all matches 7. Tries scored in all matches 8. Fewer matches forfeited 9. Classification in the previous Tahiti Championship season
Green background (rows 1 and 4) receive semi-final play-off places. Pink background (rows 5–7) may be relegated to Tahiti Championship D2. Final table — source:
