= Horo =

Horo may refer to:

== Places ==
- Horo (woreda), a woreda in Ethiopia
- Horo (Eswatini), a village in Eswatini

== People ==
- Justin Horo, New Zealand Rugby League player, son of Mark Horo
- Mark Horo, New Zealand rugby league footballer, father of Justin Horo
- Shane Horo, former New Zealand Rugby League player, brother of Mark Horo
- Horo is also a surname in Munda community of Jharkhand, India
- Holo (alternatively romanized as "Horo"), the main character in the light novel, manga and anime series Spice and Wolf

== Other ==
- Horo (cloak), stiffened cloaks worn by messengers and bodyguards on the battlefields of feudal Japan
- Horo (dance), a Bulgarian folk dance
- Horo language, a Bongo–Bagirmi language of Chad

== See also ==
- Khoro (disambiguation)
- Horus
