= Rugby union in French Polynesia =

- Country: Tahiti
- Governing body: Tahiti Rugby Union
- National team: Tahiti
- Nicknames: Aito (m); Hine (f)
- First played: 1971
- Registered players: 1,892
- Clubs: 18 (in 2011)

National competitions
- Rugby World Cup; Oceania Cup; Rugby World Cup Sevens; Oceania Sevens

Club competitions
- Tahiti Championship; Tahiti Championship D2; Tahitian Cup; Tahitian Cup D2; French Polynesian Cup; Tahiti Championship(Tens); Tahiti Championship(Sevens)

Rugby union is a popular team sport in French Polynesia, particularly on the main island of Tahiti. It was first introduced by British, Kiwi and Australian sailors, and also through the French and the strong presence of the game amongst Pacific Nations. Top Tahitian clubs participate in the domestic club league, the Championnat de Tahiti. Clubs also competed in friendlies versus foreign club teams from neighboring nations as far across the Pacific to Chile.

The national side competes annually in the Oceania Cup, last winning the competition in 2017. Traditionally, rugby union matches in French Polynesia tend to be held in the evening rather than the afternoon, due to the tropical climate. Because of this, rugby union organisers in Tahiti tend to put on entertainment during the day, to keep visiting rugby players etc. happy.

== Governing body ==
The Tahitian union was founded in 1989, and affiliated to the IRB in 1994.

== History ==
Rugby is greatly growing in popularity in Tahiti, but the national sport still remains football.

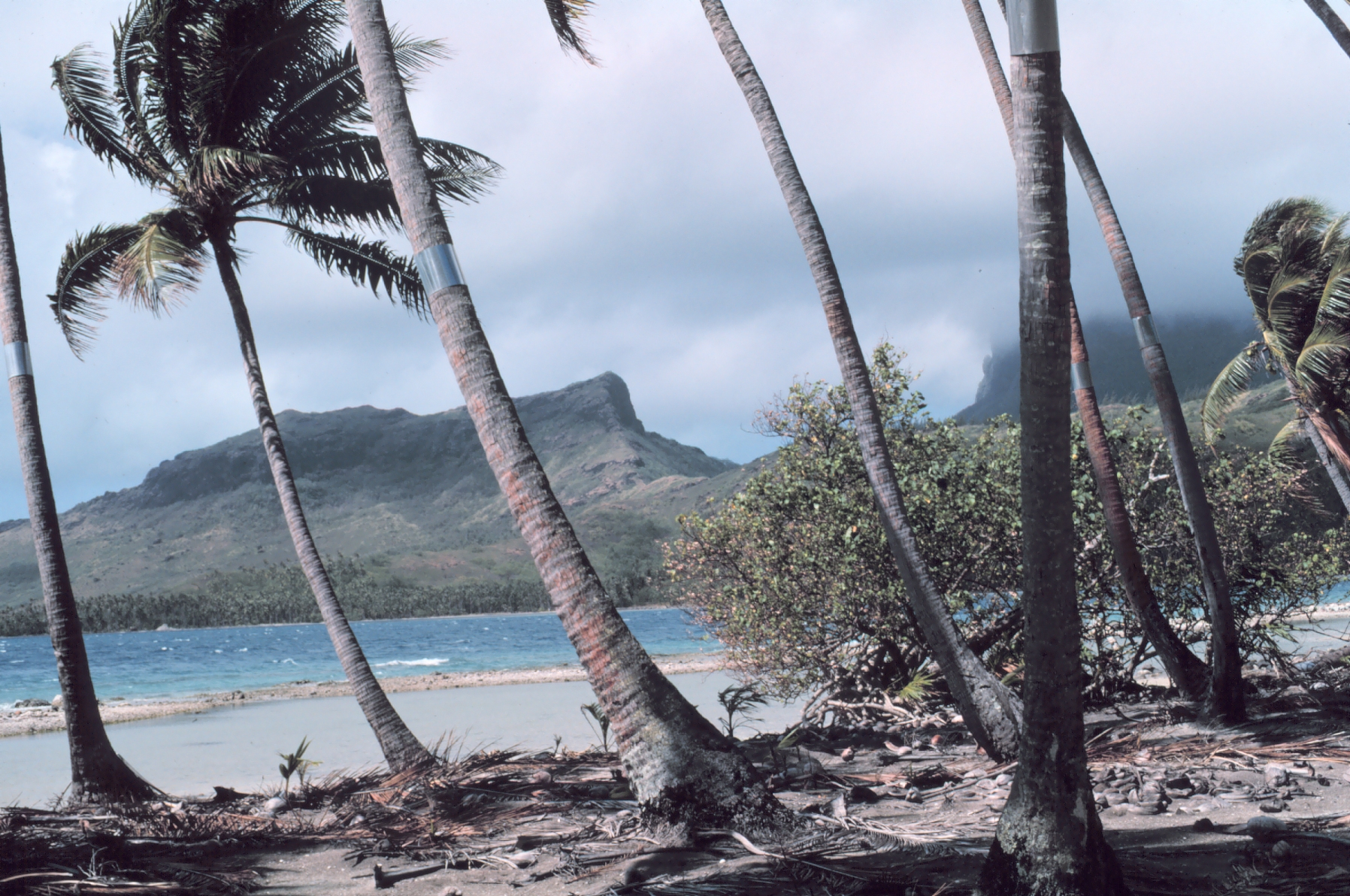
Bora Bora in French Polynesia

Rugby came to Tahiti via three separate streams, firstly, through the visits of British, New Zealand and Australian sailors; secondly, through the French presence (many of the main teams are still French military); and thirdly through contact with neighbouring Pacific islands, where the game is popular.

Up to 2003, Tahiti played in international rugby sevens (Pacific Games) and XV-a-side, in the qualifying rounds for the Rugby World Cup.

In 2006, there were fourteen clubs in the national championship and two divisions. There were also sevens competitions, women's rugby, and under-18 rugby competitions as well.

== National team ==
Lack of infrastructure and the dispersed nature of both the geography and population of Tahiti has hindered international success. The Tahiti national rugby union team had its first internationals in 1997, losing 92–6 to Papua New Guinea, and 40–0 to the Cook Islands. To be fair, Oceania is perhaps the toughest arena in World Rugby, having not just the mighty All Blacks, but also the likes of the Wallabies, Fiji, Tonga and Samoa, all of which do well in the Rugby World Cup.

Due to Tahiti being a territory of France, rugby players born in Tahiti are actually French citizens, making them eligible to represent France. The issue has been resolved with the IRB, giving the players themselves to choose which country they wish to represent.
