= 2018 Tahiti Championship season =

2018 Tahiti Championship
- Countries: Tahiti
- Date: 15 February 2018 – 23 June 2018
- Champions: Faʻaʻā (8th Title)
- Runners-up: Pirae
- Matches played: 30
- Top point scorer: (French Polynesia) Terai Tautu (Faʻaʻā); 121 points
- Top try scorer: (French Polynesia) Andrew Vanaa (Faʻaʻā); 11 tries

Official website
- www.federationpolynesiennederugby.com/competitions/2018/resultats-2018/seniors-championnat-de-tahiti-a-xv-2018.html

The 2018 Tahiti Championship competition was the 45th season of the Tahitian domestic rugby union club competition operated by the Fédération Polynésienne de Rugby (FPR).
