= 2020 Tahiti Championship season =

2020 Tahiti Championship
- Countries: Tahiti
- Date: 9 July 2020 – 6 August 2020
- Matches played: 7
- Top point scorer: (France) Mathias Delpoux (Punaauia); 23 points
- Top try scorer: (French Polynesia) Haunui Tarahu (Faʻaʻā); 3 tries

Official website
- www.federationpolynesiennederugby.com/competitions/2020/resultats-2020/seniors-championnat-de-tahiti-a-xv-2020.html

The 2020 Tahiti Championship competition is the 47th Tahitian domestic rugby union club competition operated by the Fédération Polynésienne de Rugby-Tahiti (FPR). The season was originally supposed to run from 7 March to 27 June, but due to COVID-19 pandemic in Tahiti, the season began on 9 July. Due to concerns of spreading the coronavirus, the season has been officially suspended on 9 August, with Faʻaʻā being the top team on the standings table.

== Teams ==
Club	City (commune)	Stadium	Capacity	Previous season
Arue	Papeete, Arue	Stade Fautaua	10,000	Vice Champions (1st in league)
Faʻaʻā	Papeete, Faʻaʻā	Stade Fautaua	10,000	6th
Papeete	Papeete	Stade Fautaua	10,000	Semi-finalists (4th in league)
Pirae	Papeete, Pirae	Stade Fautaua	10,000	Champions (2nd in league)
Punaauia	Papeete, Punaauia	Stade Fautaua	10,000	Semi-finalists (3rd in league)

== Number of teams by regions ==
All teams this season are from Papeete or suburbs of the Papeete Urban Area.

Teams	Region or island	Team(s)
5	Tahiti	Arue, Faʻaʻā, Papeete, Pirae and Punaauia

== Competition format ==
The top four teams at the end of the regular season (after all the teams played one another twice.) enter a knockout stage to decide the Champions of Tahiti. This consists of two rounds. The semi-finals, with the losers meeting for 3rd place and with the winners meeting in the final. All matches are held at the Stade Fautaua in Pirae.

Since as far back as 2015, Tahiti's bonus point system operates as follows:

- 4 points for a win.
- 2 points for a draw.
- 1 point for a loss.
- No point for a forfeit.
- 1 bonus point for scoring at least 4 tries (or more).
- 1 bonus point for losing by 7 points (or fewer).

== Table ==
2020 Tahiti Championship table
Pos	Team	Pld	W	D	L	PF	PA	PD	TF	TA	TB	LB	Pts	Qualification
1	Faʻaʻā	3	2	1	0	67	43	+24	5	2	1	1	12	Semi-finals
2	Punaauia	3	2	0	1	50	39	+11	2	0	1	1	10	Semi-finals
3	Pirae	3	1	1	1	77	45	+32	2	1	1	1	8	Semi-finals
4	Arue	3	0	1	2	34	82	−48	2	0	0	0	2	Semi-finals
5	Papeete	2	0	1	1	23	42	−19	0	1	0	0	2	

Rules for classification: If teams are level at any stage, tiebreakers are applied in the following order:
1. Competition points earned in head-to-head matches
2. Points difference in head-to-head matches
3. Try differential in head-to-head matches
4. Points difference in all matches
5. Try differential in all matches
6. Points scored in all matches
7. Tries scored in all matches
8. Fewer matches forfeited
9. Classification in the previous Tahiti Championship season
Due to the COVID-19 pandemic in Tahiti and the suspension of the season, teams may end up not having to be relegated to Tahiti Championship D2.
