= 2015 Tahiti Championship season =

2015 Tahiti Championship
- Countries: Tahiti
- Date: 17 September 2015 – 12 December 2015
- Champions: Pirae (5th Title)
- Runners-up: Faʻaʻā
- Matches played: 34

The 2015 Tahiti Championship competition was the 42nd season of the Tahitian domestic rugby union club competition operated by the Fédération Polynésienne de Rugby (FPR).
