= 2016 Tahiti Championship season =

2016 Tahiti Championship
- Countries: Tahiti
- Date: 1 October 2016 – 10 December 2016
- Champions: Pirae (6th Title)
- Runners-up: Punaauia
- Matches played: 14
- Top point scorer: (French Polynesia) Christopher Guilain (Pirae); 62 points
- Top try scorer: (French Polynesia) Andrew Vanaa (Faa'a); 8 tries

The 2016 Tahiti Championship competition was the 43rd season of the Tahitian domestic rugby union club competition operated by the Fédération Polynésienne de Rugby (FPR).
