= 2017 Tahiti Championship season =

2017 Tahiti Championship
- Countries: Tahiti
- Date: 25 February 2017 – 17 June 2017
- Champions: Faʻaʻā (7th Title)
- Runners-up: Pirae
- Matches played: 23
- Top point scorer: (French Polynesia) Terai Tautu (Faʻaʻā); 196 points
- Top try scorer: (French Polynesia) Roberto Reva (Papeete); 14 tries

Official website
- www.federationpolynesiennederugby.com/competitions/2017/resultats-2017/seniors-championnat-de-tahiti-a-xv-2017.html

The 2017 Tahiti Championship competition was the 44th season of the Tahitian domestic rugby union club competition operated by the Fédération Polynésienne de Rugby (FPR).
