= Polynesian Rugby Federation =

Governing body for rugby union in Tahiti

Fédération Polynésienne de Rugby
- Sport: Rugby union
- Founded: 2015
- President: Laurent Tardieu
- Men's coach: Romi Ropati
- Website: FPR.com

The Polynesian Rugby Federation (French: Fédération Polynésienne de Rugby FPR) also known as Polynesian Rugby Federation-Tahiti (French: Fédération Polynésienne de Rugby-Tahiti) is the governing body for rugby union in Tahiti. It is responsible for the Tahitian national team and the Fédération Polynésienne de Rugby-Tahiti that administers the country's professional leagues.

== History ==
Due to Many Tahitians involved in the sport not recognizing the president of the FTR, the Polynesian Rugby Federation was formed in 2015. In 2018, FTR who is affiliated with World Rugby had to pull out of the Pacific Mini Games(Pacific Games) sevens rugby tournament due to not having the government of French Polynesia's support. This is because the government instead supports FPR.

== Presidents ==
- Apolosi Foliaki (2016-2019)
- Laurent Tardieu (2019–2020)

== See also ==
- Tahiti national rugby union team
- Fédération Polynésienne de Rugby-Tahiti
