= Vaivai =

Vaivai is a surname. Notable people with the surname include:

- Apolonia Vaivai (born 1991), Fijian weightlifter
- Paterika Vaivai (born 1992), Samoan rugby player and footballer
- Taioalo Vaivai (born 1990), New Zealand-born American rugby player
