= Khoro =

Khoro may refer to:

People

- Khan Bahadur Muhammed Ayub Khoro, Chief Minister of Sindh, a province of Pakistan, in 1947–1948
- Nisar Khoro, Pakistani politician, leader of the opposition in Provincial Assembly of Sindh, member of the Tehrik-e-Istiqlal party

Places

- Khoro (rural locality), several rural localities in Russia

Other

- Horo (dance), a Bulgarian folk dance
- Khoro clan, a Hindu clan

== See also ==
- Horo (disambiguation)
