= Suaia Matagi =

New Zealand and Samoa international rugby league footballer

Sui Matagi
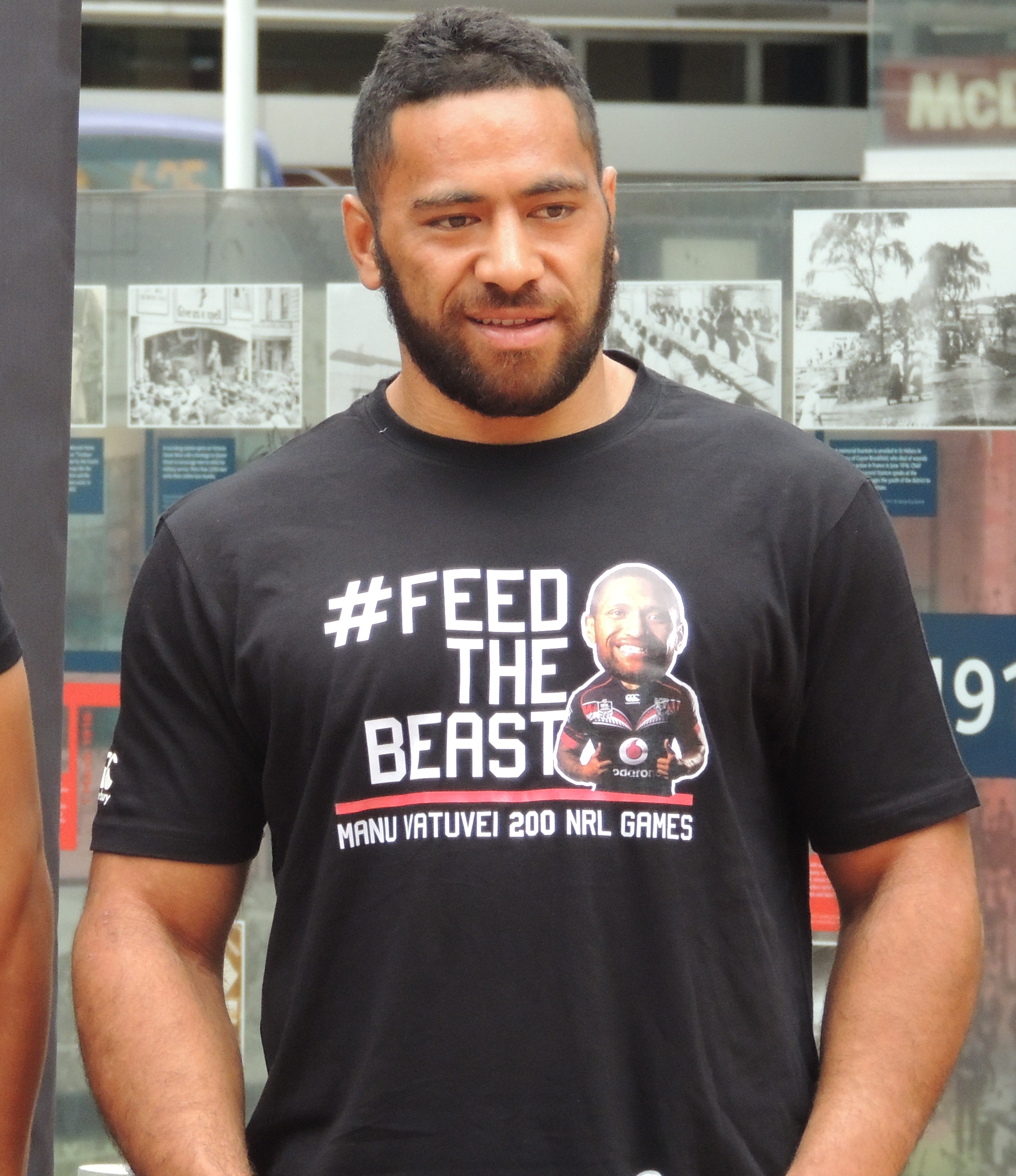

Personal information
- Full name: Suaia Matagi
- Born: 23 March 1988 (age 38) Auckland, New Zealand
- Height: 5 ft 9 in (1.75 m)
- Weight: 17 st 0 lb (108 kg)

Playing information
- Position: Prop
Club
Years	Team	Pld	T	G	FG	P
2013–15	New Zealand Warriors	36	1	0	0	4
2015	Sydney Roosters	7	0	0	0	0
2016	Penrith Panthers	23	0	0	0	0
2017–18	Parramatta Eels	35	0	0	0	0
2018–21	Huddersfield Giants	50	3	0	0	12
2021(loan)	→ Castleford Tigers	13	0	0	0	0
2022–23	Castleford Tigers	37	3	0	0	12
2023(DR)	→ Halifax Panthers	1	0	0	0	0
2024–	Doncaster	77	6	0	0	24
	Total	279	13	0	0	52
Representative
Years	Team	Pld	T	G	FG	P
2013–17	Samoa	7	2	0	0	8
2014	New Zealand	1	0	0	0	0
2018	NSW Residents	1	0	0	0	0
2021	Combined Nations All Stars	1	0	0	0	0
- Source: As of 17 November 2026
- Relatives: Chris Matagi (son)

Suaia Matagi (born 23 March 1988), also known by the nickname of "Sui", is a professional rugby league footballer who plays as a prop forward for Doncaster in the RFL Championship. He is both a New Zealand and Samoan international.

He previously played for the New Zealand Warriors, the Sydney Roosters, the Penrith Panthers and the Parramatta Eels in the NRL, and the Huddersfield Giants and the Castleford Tigers in the Super League. He has also spent time on dual registration from Castleford at Halifax Panthers in the Championship.

== Early life ==
Matagi was born in Auckland, New Zealand, to Samoan and Tuvaluan parents, the second youngest of six brothers. He attended Kelston Boys' High School before dropping out at age 14, having become involved in gang violence, and heavy alcohol abuse.

In 2006, at the age of 17, Matagi was sentenced to three years in prison for assaulting two boys during a drunken rage that occurred when he was 15. He served his sentence at Mount Eden Prison, and later Manawatu Prison; his participation in rehabilitation courses saw him granted parole after one year.

== Playing career ==
Following his release from prison, Matagi took up rugby league in 2008, having never previously played any organised sport. He played for the Te Atatu Roosters, and later the Mount Albert Lions in the Auckland Rugby League competition. Matagi was selected to play for the Auckland representative team, and the New Zealand Residents for four consecutive years between 2009 and 2012. He was named man of the match in Auckland's 44-34 victory over the South Island Scorpions in the National Competition's 2011 Grand Final.

=== New Zealand Warriors ===
Matagi made his debut for the Auckland Vulcans, the New Zealand Warriors' feeder team, in the New South Wales Cup on 3 April 2010. He played regularly for the Vulcans in 2012, and was named 2012 New Zealand domestic player of the year. Matagi trialed with the Warriors during the 2013 pre-season, impressing coach Matthew Elliott enough to earn an NRL contract.

Matagi made his NRL debut for the Warriors on 11 May 2013 against the Canterbury-Bankstown Bulldogs at Westpac Stadium. On 11 June 2013, he re-signed with the Warriors until the end of 2014. Matagi played 11 games for the Warriors in 2013, scoring a try in their match against the Penrith Panthers in round 23. On 22 September 2013, Matagi was named at prop in the 2013 New South Wales Cup Team of the Year.

Matagi was a member of the Warriors' squad that played in the 2014 and 2015 Auckland Nines pre-season tournaments. On 2 March 2014, Matagi re-signed with the Warriors until the end of 2016. He played in all 24 of the Warriors' regular season games in 2014, but played in only 1 game during the first half of 2015 before being dropped to the Warriors' New South Wales Cup team.

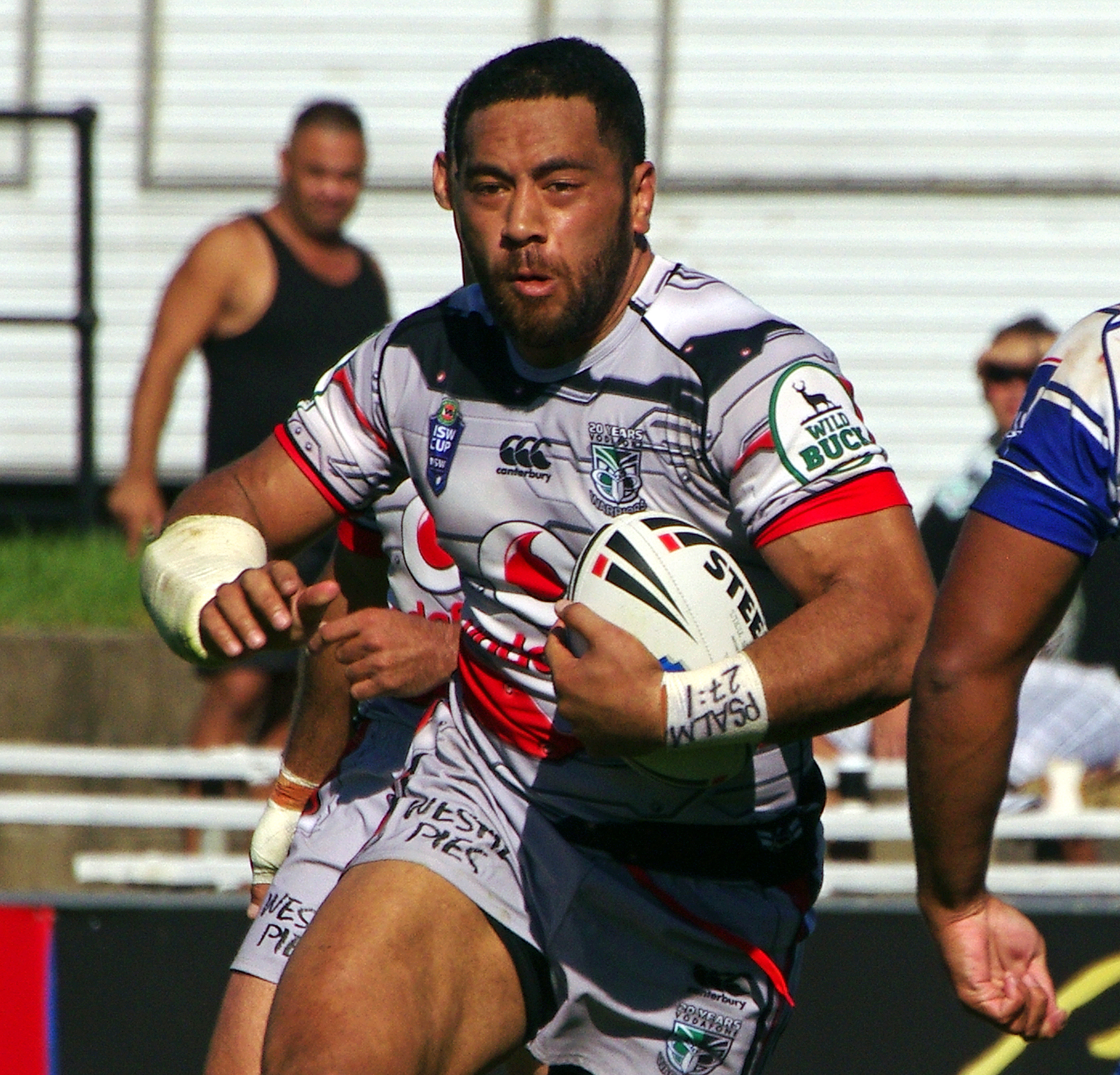
Matagi playing for the Warriors in 2015

In May 2015, Matagi requested, and was granted, a release from his contract with the Warriors in order to sign with the Sydney Roosters effective immediately.

Stuff.co.nz, and The Sydney Morning Herald described Matagi as having built a cult following during his time at the Warriors.

=== Sydney Roosters ===
Upon moving to the Roosters, Matagi played for their feeder club, the Wyong Roos, in the New South Wales Cup. An injury to Jared Waerea-Hargreaves saw Matagi play seven games for the Sydney Roosters in the back-end of 2015.

=== Penrith Panthers ===
On 4 November 2015, Matagi signed a one-year contract with the Penrith Panthers, with an option for a second year. He was a late addition to the Panthers' 2016 Auckland Nines squad following an injury to Reagan Campbell-Gillard. Matagi was a regular for the Panthers' in 2016, playing a total of 23 games.

=== Parramatta Eels ===
In November 2016, Matagi signed a two-year contract with the Parramatta Eels. Matagi was part of the Parramatta side which finished fourth on the table and made the finals for the first time since 2009. In 2018, Matagi started the first two games of the season from the interchange bench. Following Parramatta's humiliating 54-0 Round 2 up defeat by Manly, Matagi was left out of the Parramatta side by coach Brad Arthur but was recalled 5 weeks later in Round 7 where Parramatta defeated Manly 44-10. Matagi played a total of nine games for Parramatta in the 2018 NRL season as the club endured a horrid campaign finishing last on the table.

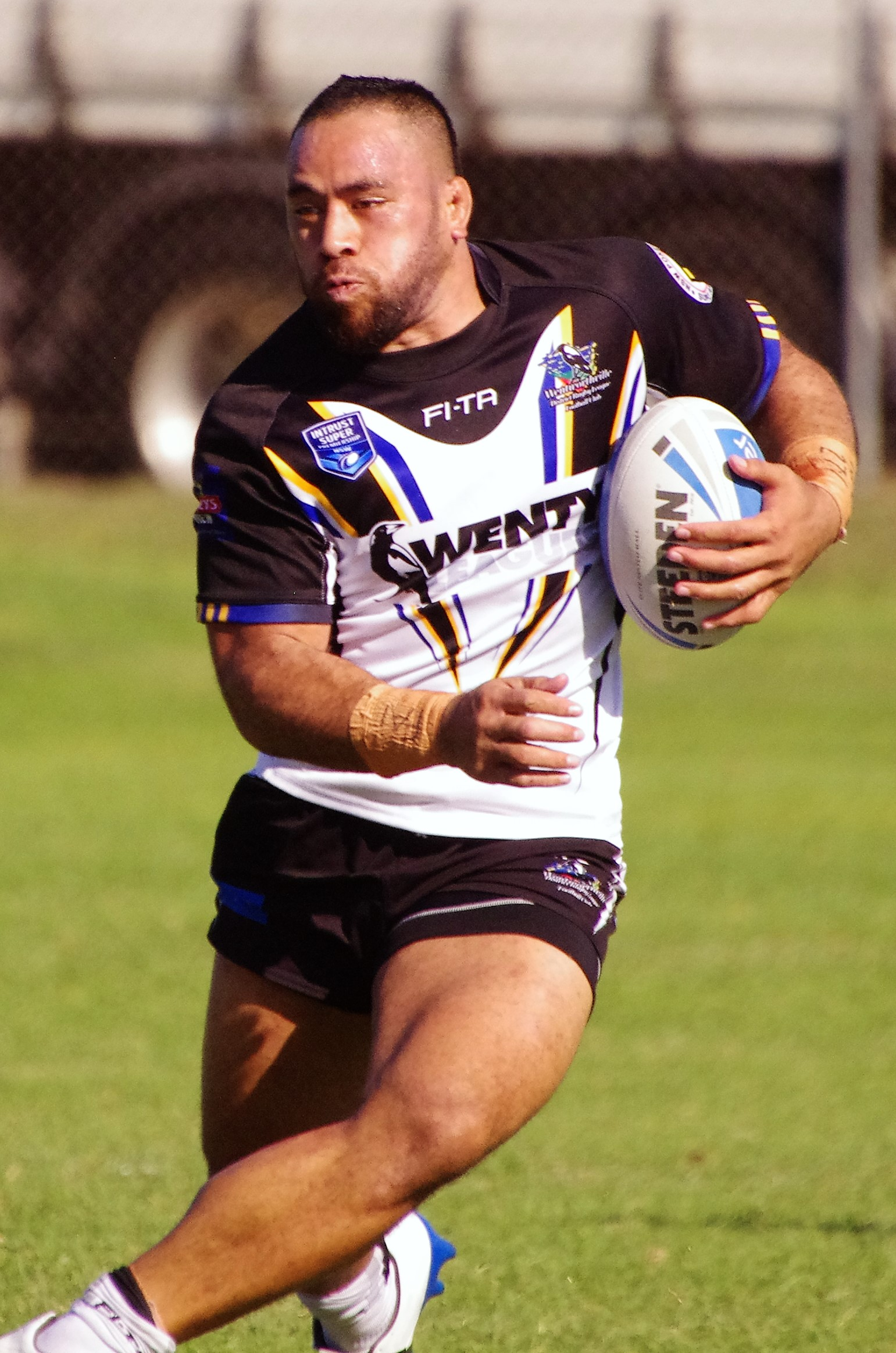
Matagi playing for the Wentworthville Magpies in 2018

In June 2018, Matagi was selected to play for NSW residents against the QLD residents side.

=== Huddersfield Giants ===
On 1 July 2018, Matagi signed a two-year deal to join English side Huddersfield beginning in 2019. Matagi said of the move "I am extremely excited to take my football to the next level under the leadership of coach Simon Woolford and I'm also looking forward to the challenge of playing in the English Super League, joining a proud club like the Huddersfield Giants is a privilege and I will represent our fans to the best of my ability".

==== Castleford Tigers (loan) ====
On 25 November 2020, it was reported that Matagi had signed for the Castleford Tigers in the Super League on a season-long loan from Huddersfield. He sustained a calf injury during pre-season training which forced him to miss the start of the season. He made his Castleford debut on 22 May against the Warrington Wolves.

=== Castleford Tigers ===
On 10 October 2021, it was announced that Matagi had signed a deal to remain at Castleford on a permanent basis, joining the Tigers on a two-year contract.

Matagi scored his first try for the Tigers against Wakefield Trinity on 14 April 2022. Later in the season, he also scored against Toulouse and Hull FC.

After a strong start to the 2023 season, Matagi was unavailable during June and July as he returned to New Zealand due to a bereavement. He played a total of 15 matches for Castleford in the 2023 season as the club finished 11th on the table narrowly avoiding relegation. On 19 September, Castleford confirmed that Matagi would depart the club upon the expiration of his contract.

=== Doncaster RLFC ===
On 4 November 2023, it was announced that Matagi would join Doncaster R.L.F.C. in the Championship for 2024.

== Representative career ==
Matagi made his international debut for Samoa at the 2013 World Cup, playing in all four of their matches, scoring tries against New Zealand and Papua New Guinea. In May 2014, Matagi played for Samoa in the 2014 Pacific Rugby League test against Fiji to qualify for the 2014 Four Nations.

In October 2014, Matagi was named in both the New Zealand and Samoan Four Nations squads. He opted to represent New Zealand, playing in one of their four matches, against Samoa.

Matagi was named in New Zealand's train-on squad for the 2016 Four Nations, but was not included in the final team.

On 25 June 2021, he played for the Combined Nations All Stars in their 26-24 victory over England, staged at the Halliwell Jones Stadium, Warrington, as part of England’s 2021 Rugby League World Cup preparation.

== Personal life ==
Matagi is a Christian. He is a father of four children with his partner Fai.
