= Dean Orr =

New Zealand international rugby league footballer

Personal information
- Born: 1964 (age 60–61) New Zealand

Playing information
- Position: Wing
Club
Years	Team	Pld	T	G	FG	P
	Te Atatu
Representative
Years	Team	Pld	T	G	FG	P
	Auckland
1983	New Zealand	1	0	0	0	0

Dean Orr is a New Zealand former rugby league footballer who represented New Zealand.

== Playing career ==
Orr grew up in Te Atatū Peninsula, attended Matipo Primary School and played for the Te Atatu Roosters in the Auckland Rugby League competition.

In 1983 he represented the New Zealand national rugby league team, playing in one test match against Papua New Guinea. He is Kiwi number 585.
