= Marvin Filipo =

New Zealand rugby league footballer

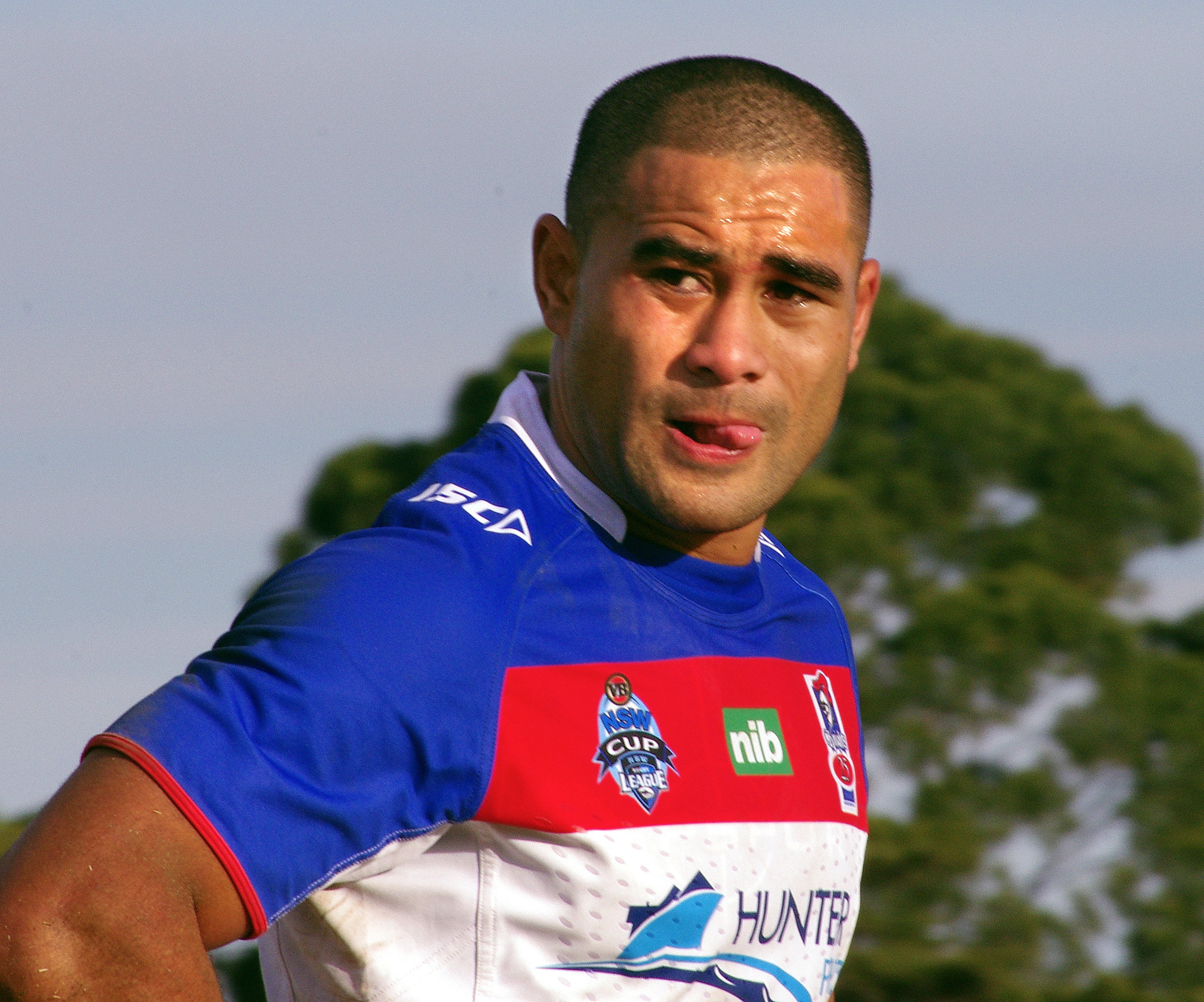
- Filipo playing for the Knights in 2012

Personal information
- Born: 20 March 1987 (age 39) Auckland, New Zealand
- Height: 179 cm (5 ft 10 in)
- Weight: 101 kg (15 st 13 lb)

Playing information
- Position: Second-row, Centre
Club
Years	Team	Pld	T	G	FG	P
2011–12	Newcastle Knights	4	0	0	0	0
- Source: Rugby League Project As of 1 October 2015

Marvin Filipo (born 20 March 1987) is a New Zealand professional rugby league footballer who currently plays for the Dora Creek Swampies in the Newcastle & Hunter Rugby League. He plays at second-row and centre. He previously played for the Newcastle Knights in the National Rugby League.

== Playing career ==
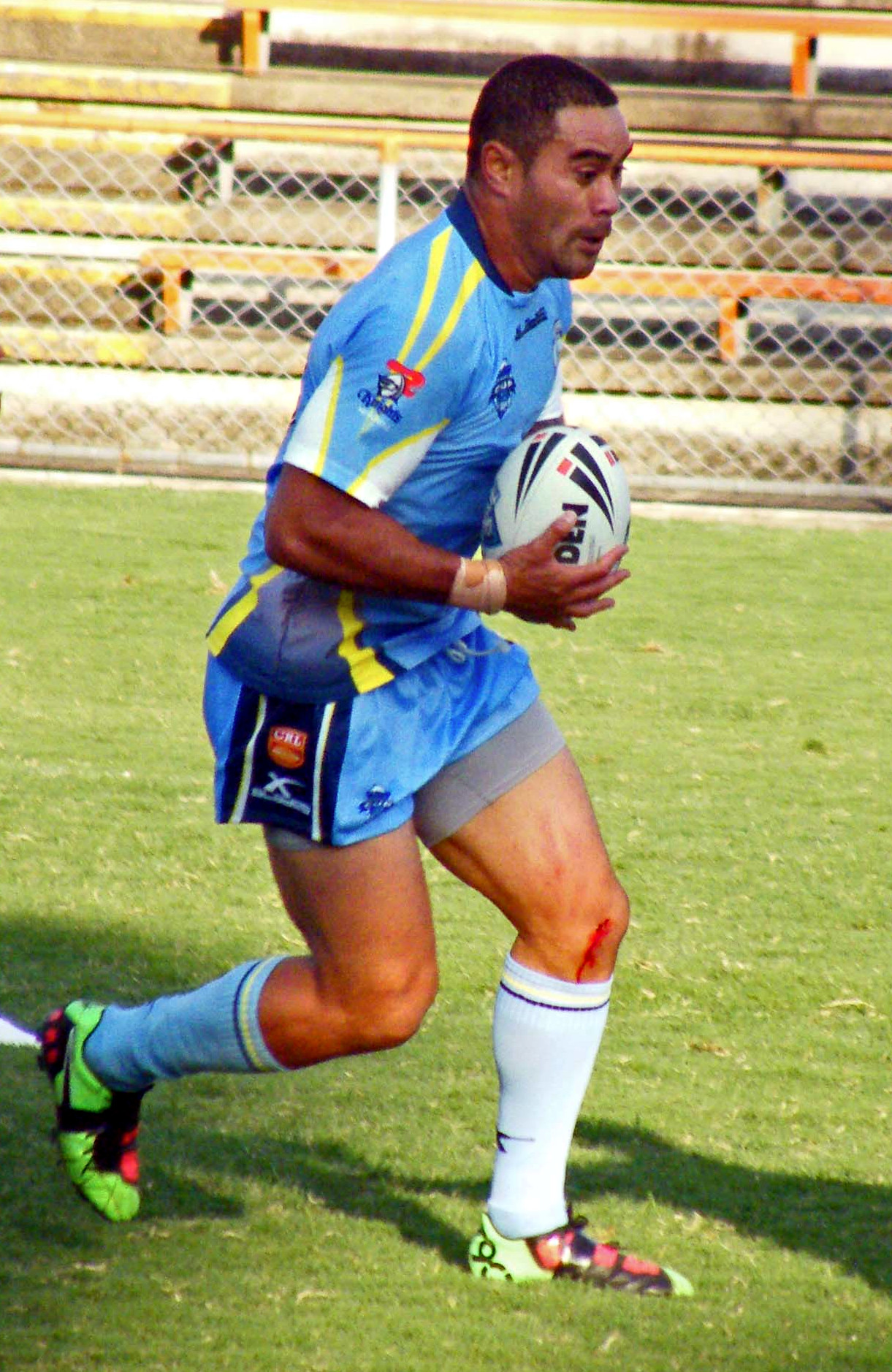
Filipo playing for the Central Coast Centurions in 2011.

Born in Auckland, New Zealand, Filipo played his junior football for the Mangere East Hawks in the Auckland Rugby League competition and the Counties Manukau Jetz in the Bartercard Cup before being signed by the New Zealand Warriors. In 2004, he played a pre-season trial match for the Warriors. In 2005 he was part of the NZRL's Presidents selection that played a trial against the Warriors. In 2006, Filipo was elevated to the Warriors first-grade squad.

He left the club at the end of that season due to lack of first-grade opportunities and instead joined a feeder club for the Brisbane Broncos. Filipo failed to settle in Brisbane so briefly switched codes to rugby union before heading home to Ōtara in New Zealand.

In 2008, Filipo returned to Australia, joining the Nelson Bay Northern Blues in the Newcastle Rugby League competition. He represented Newcastle at regional rugby league championships.

He made the 2009 Country Firsts Team, while playing for Nelson Bay, which caught the interest of the Newcastle Knights.

In 2010, Filipo joined the Newcastle Knights on a second-tier contract. He played for the Knights' NSW Cup reserve-grade team from 2010 to 2012 and was named the Centurions, Newcastle's feeder team, Player of the Year in 2010.

In round 10 of the 2011 NRL season, Filipo made his NRL debut for the Newcastle side against his former team, the New Zealand Warriors.

In August 2011, Filipo re-signed with Newcastle on a one-year contract.

On 30 August 2012, Filipo again re-signed with Newcastle on a one-year contract.

On 12 September 2012, Filipo was named at second-row in the 2012 NSW Cup Team of the Year. He also won the NSW Cup Representative Player of the Year for his performance with the NSW Residents earlier in the year.

In May 2013, Filipo was released from his Newcastle contract after being involved in an altercation, however Newcastle CEO Matthew Gidley said they would review his position at the completion of the season and would consider signing him again.

For the rest of 2013 and early 2014, Filipo played for the Wyong Roos in the New South Wales Cup and the Limoux Grizzlies in the Elite One Championship.

In December 2013, Filipo returned to Newcastle, New South Wales to talk to the club about a return when his French contract ended in May 2014.

On 24 May 2014, Filipo signed back with the Newcastle Knights for the remainder of the 2014 NRL season.

On 4 November 2014, Filipo re-signed with the Newcastle club on a one-year contract.

On 27 September 2015, Filipo played in Newcastle's 2015 New South Wales Cup Grand Final win over the Wyong Roos. In September 2015, it was revealed that he would be leaving the Newcastle outfit after their 2015 NRL State Championship match against the Ipswich Jets.

In 2016, Filipo joined the Cessnock Goannas in the Newcastle Rugby League.

== Representative career ==
In 2004 and 2005, Filipo played for the Junior Kiwis.

In 2008, while in Newcastle, Filipo represented Newcastle at regional rugby league championships and made the Country Firsts Team in 2009.

In 2012, Filipo was selected at second-row for the NSW Residents team to play the QLD Residents at Suncorp Stadium as a curtain raiser to the Game 3, State of Origin decider. After the game he was voted Players' Player.

== Controversy ==
In May 2008, he was summoned to the Newcastle Local Court after being involved in an incident at a local kebab store. He was sentenced to 300 hours of community service.
