= Pāpāmoa College =

Location
- 151 Doncaster Drive; Papamoa; Tauranga 3118; New Zealand; 37.7119°S 176.3015°E

Information
- Funding type: State
- Motto: Embracing opportunities; creating excellence
- Opened: February 2011
- Ministry of Education Institution no.: 6963
- Principal: Iva Ropati
- Years offered: 7–13
- Gender: Co-educational
- Enrolment: 1,869 (July 2026)
- Socio-economic decile: 6N
- Website: www.papamoacollege.school.nz

Pāpāmoa College is a state coeducational Year 7–13 secondary school located in the eastern suburbs of Tauranga, New Zealand. The school opened in February 2011 as the city's fifth state secondary school, serving the growing Papamoa area. As of July 2026, the school has 1,869 students from Years 7 to 13 (ages 11 to 18).

== History ==
The Government purchased the Pāpāmoa College site in 1999. The school was gazetted by the Education Minister, Anne Tolley, on 27 May 2009. Construction of the school began in October 2009, and cost $27.7 million.

Pāpāmoa College opened for the first time in February 2011, initially taking only Year 7–9 students. The school was officially opened on 15 April 2011, with Minister Tolley, Tauranga mayor Stuart Crosby, and local MP Tony Ryall in attendance. Additional school years opened as the 2011 Year 9 students moved through. The final year, Year 13, opened at the beginning of 2015.

== Enrolment ==
At the July 2012 Education Review Office (ERO) review of the school, Pāpāmoa College had 603 students enrolled. The school roll's gender composition was 51% male and 49% female, and its ethnic composition was 56% European New Zealanders (Pākehā), 26% Māori, 12% other European, 3% Indian, 2% other Asian, and 1% Pasifika.

As of 2026, Pāpāmoa College has an Equity Index of 458, placing it amongst schools whose students have average socioeconomic barriers to achievement (roughly equivalent to deciles 5 and 6 under the former socio-economic decile system).
