= Te Atatu Roosters =

NZ rugby league club, based in Te Atatū

Club information
- Full name: Te Atatu Rugby League and Sports Club
- Nickname: Roosters/Tat
- Short name: Te Atatu Roosters
- Colours: Red, white and blue
- Founded: 1955
- Website: https://www.sporty.co.nz/teataturoosters/

Current details
- Grounds: Jack Colvin Park; Te Atatu South Park
- Coach: Craig Godfrey & Lila Vaivai
- Manager: Aleesha Gordon, Toni Fauonuku (Trainer, Paterika Vaivai)
- Captain: Paterika Vaivai and Fine Vakautakakala
- Competition: Auckland Rugby League
- 2024: Fox Memorial Shield

Records
- Premierships: 1988
- Runners-up: 1986, 1990, 1993
- Rukutai Shield (minor premiership): 1986
- National Club Champions: 1986, 1988
- Roope Rooster: 2006, 2024
- Kiwi Shield: 1986, 1988
- Sharman Cup: 1970, 1973, 1974, 1976, 1978, 2016

The Te Atatu Roosters is a rugby league club based in Te Atatū, New Zealand. They participate in the Auckland Rugby League competition. They currently have 25 teams across schoolboy, junior and senior grades. The Roosters premier team is in the 2024 season Fox Memorial Shield competition after qualifying from the 3-match qualifying competition.

== Home ground ==
The Roosters play at the council owned Jack Colvin Park located on the Te Atatū Peninsula, next to the North Western Motorway. Junior teams also play at Te Atatū South Park.

== History ==
=== 1950s ===
The Te Atatū club was founded in 1955 after the opening of the North-Western motorway led to suburban growth in the Te Atatū area. The first team was a 7-aside team formed to represent Te Atatū North and South. They initially wore Glenora jerseys (who were a club based in Glen Eden), and their first game was against Wesley at Fowlds Park. The first training area was in a cow paddock on Edmonton Rd, before they were later able to move to Ramlea Park.

=== 1960s ===
In 1961, Te Atatū won their first schoolboy championship in their Te Atatū colours. In 1960–61, Te Atatū Peninsula Park was developed on Neil Avenue and in 1965, they fielded their first senior side in the Senior B grade. The ground is still commonly referred to as 'Neil Ave'.

In the late 1960s, work began on the current club rooms on Toru Avenue. However, before the club rooms could be built, the land needed to be prepared. The land was in extremely poor condition; life member Ken Pitman described the task of preparing it, stating: "What a mess, over six acres of swamp, gorse and pine trees, five feet thick. Well, we were all enthusiastic and silly enough to attempt the impossible. We chopped, scrounged, swore, drank and burned our way through the lot". The council also helped by putting a culvert under the motorway and realigning the creek, which ran through the park.

The club rooms took over 6 years to complete: the foundation stone was laid on 17 December 1962, and the official opening was held on 19 April 1969 by MP Martin Finlay.

=== 1970s ===
By the 1970s, Te Atatū were becoming more competitive on the field at senior level—they defeated all of the top clubs over a period of time, including Ellerslie Eagles, Mt Albert Lions, Glenora Bears, Richmond Bulldogs and Ponsonby Ponies. At this time, the club also began producing NZ international quality players such as Dennis Williams, who, aged only 18, famously scored a brilliant individual try with his first touch of the ball in his debut test versus Great Britain, along with John Smith and John Wilson. In 1973, they won the Senior Competition and the Phelan Shield. In the same year, they played the first ever Australian Aboriginal rugby league team in a pre-season game, losing 13–17.

Around this time, other branches of the club were formed at Ranui (which later led to the formation of the Waitemata Seagulls), and Massey. Teams playing at Moire Park in Massey were known as Te Atatū Massey. The nickname 'Roosters' was adopted along with the Eastern Suburbs (now Sydney Roosters) style jersey. In 1976, they turned 21 yrs old and celebrated with a ball at the Mandalay in the city. In 1979, club members looking for a summer activity to continue bonding and to develop player skills formed the Te Atatū Roosters Softball Club. The softball club has since relocated to the Massey Rugby Club and plays at Rosedale Park on Auckland's North Shore, but has retained the name Roosters Softball Club.

=== 1980s ===
The 1980s saw the club first begin to experience success. In 1986, they were runners-up in the Fox Memorial Shield to Mt Albert, losing 31–4, but weeks later were crowned National Club Champions after defeating the same opposition 36–10. Then, in 1988, they won the Fox Memorial Shield, beating local rivals Glenora 22–16 in the final at Carlaw Park and a month later won the National Club title for the second time by again defeating Glenora at Eden Park as a curtain-raiser to the Kiwis – Kangaroo World Cup final.

=== 2010s ===
In 2016, Te Atatū formed their first women's premier team. They played six seasons and won the 2nd division title twice (2016 and 2019).

=== 2020s ===
However, they did not field a women's team in 2022.

== Titles ==
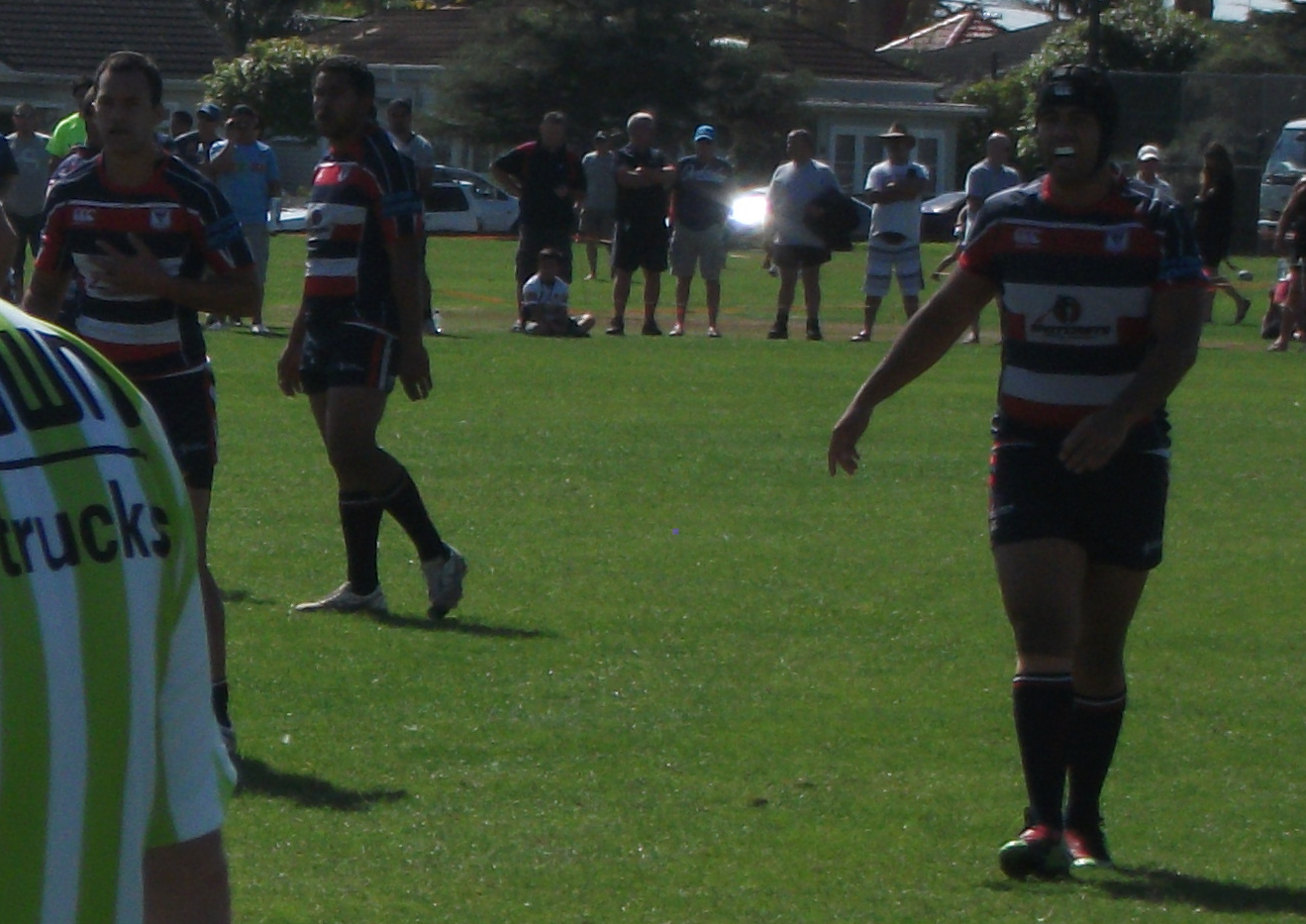
Te Atatu players in a match against Point Chevalier in 2011

Te Atatu's first-ever senior trophy was the Gillette Cup in 1968. They won it again in 1974. Another trophy won by Te Atatu early in their existence was the Sharman Cup, which they won five times: in 1970, 1973, 1974, 1976 and 1978.

Te Atatu had a historic year in 1986 when they won the Rukutai Shield for winning the minor premiership and making the Fox Memorial grand final (both for the first time), where they lost to the Mt Albert Lions 31–4. A month later, they had revenge when they beat the Lions by 36–10 to claim their first National Club title at Carlaw Park, defeating Randwick and Upper Hutt along the way.

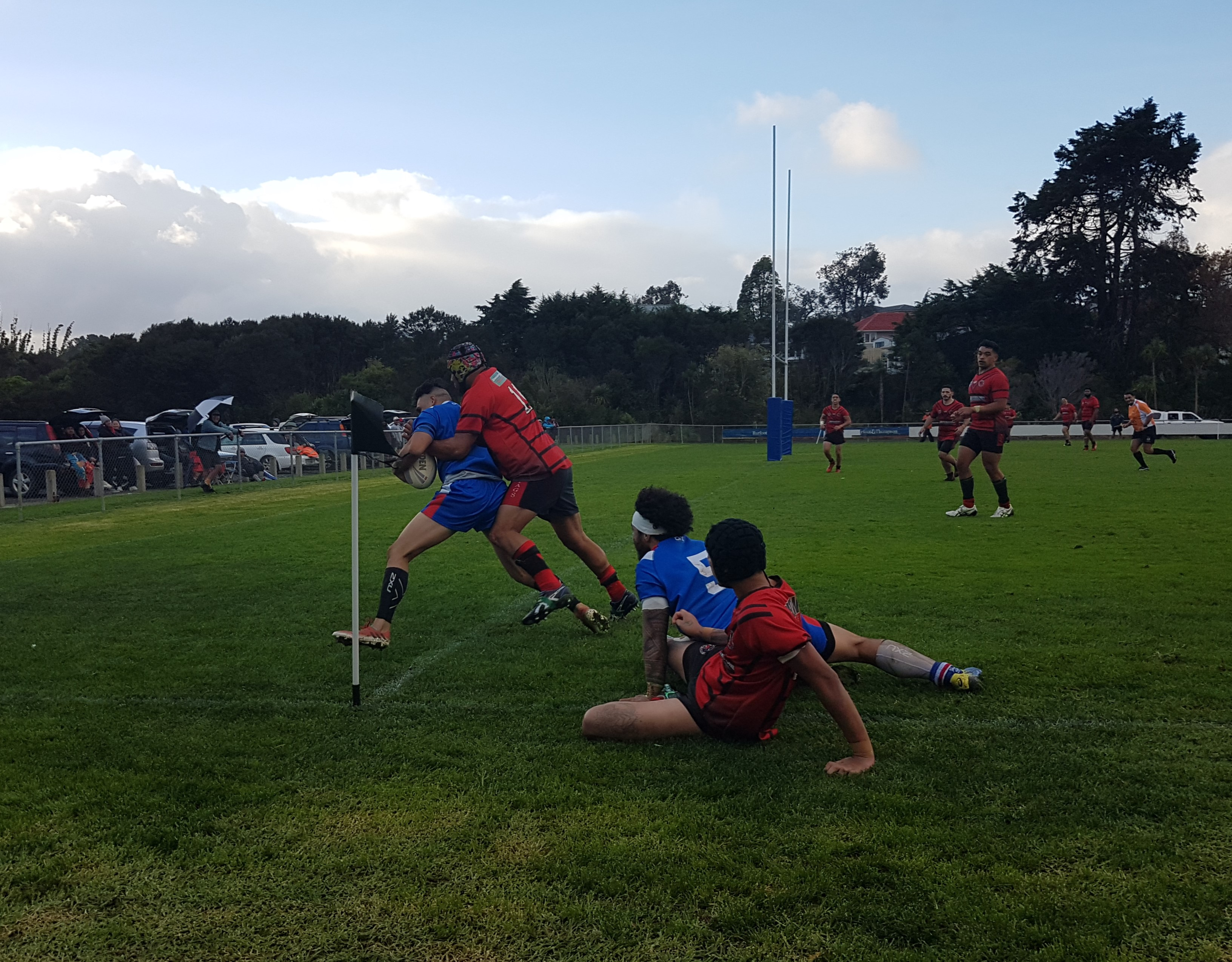
Te Atatu scoring v New Lynn in 2016

Te Atatu finally won the coveted Fox Memorial Shield, awarded to the Auckland club champions in 1988 with a win over local rivals the Glenora Bears. They also went on to win the Lion Red National Club Final against Glenora at Eden Park 18–8 in the same year. The match was televised live as it was the curtain-raiser to the New Zealand – Australia Rugby League World Cup final, which Australia went on to win 25–12 in front of 45,363 spectators.

In 1990, they again made the Fox Memorial final but lost to a Tawera Nikau inspired Otahuhu Leopards. In 1993, they made the Fox Memorial final for the 4th time but were again defeated by the Northcote Tigers 29–10.

In 2005, the Roosters celebrated their 50th Jubilee. In 2007, Te Atatu won the Roope Rooster (which by this time had become a trophy the winning team defended on their home ground). They defeated Mt Albert to win it and defended it for 3 matches before losing it to the Richmond Bulldogs.

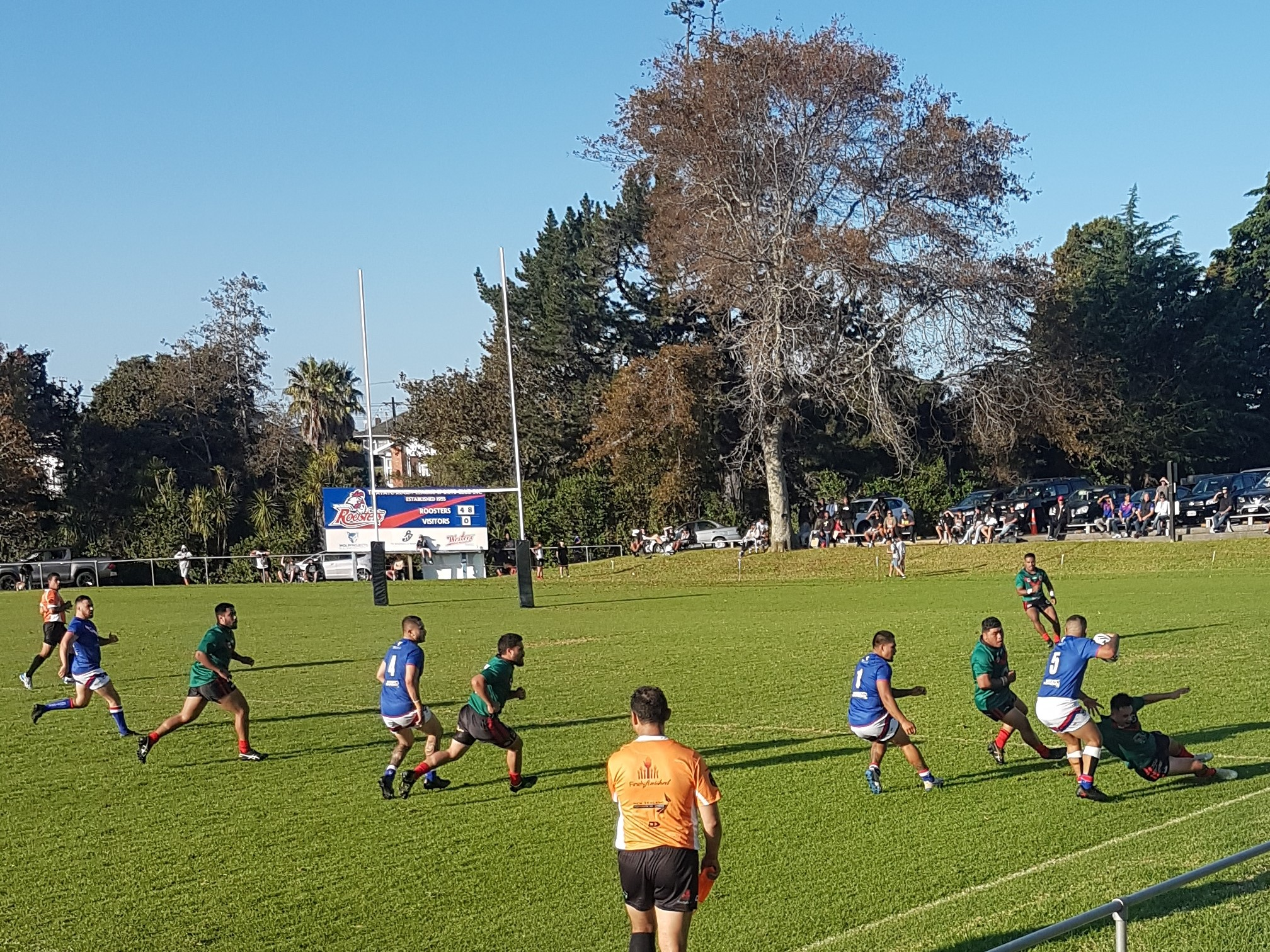
Te Atatu v Mangere East at Jack Colvin Park on May 7, 2022

In 2010, they finished 4th at the end of the regular season in the Fox Memorial and defeated 3rd placed Howick in the minor final, before losing to Otahuhu in the preliminary final. The 2011 to 2014 seasons were largely uneventful, spent in the lower divisions. The 2014 season was arguably one of the worst in the club's history, with just 2 wins from 18 games, both over the last placed Manukau Magpies.

The club rebuilt in 2015 by appointing Revell Neil and bringing in many new players to the premier team. This saw a massive reversal in results, and over the 2015 and 2016 seasons, they won a remarkable 35 games, with 2 draws and just 3 losses. In 2015, they had their 60th Jubilee, which featured a celebratory match with local rivals Glenora and was won by Te Atatu 38–28.

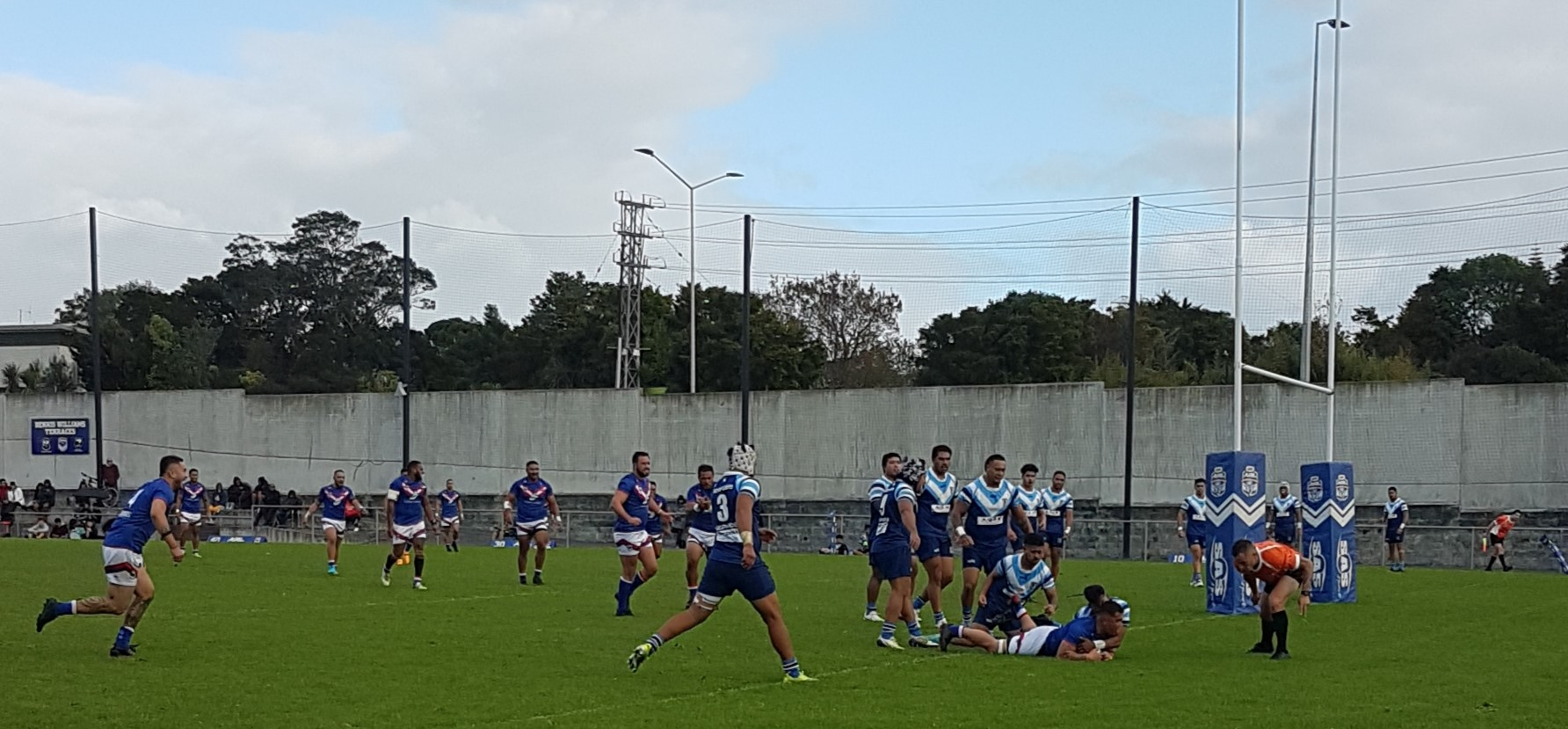
Tuteauru Maipi scoring for Te Atatu, 21 May 2022

They also won the Phelan Shield in this time. In 2016 they won the Phelan Shield again along with promotion back to the Fox Memorial when they beat the Bay Roskill Vikings 31–22 in the Sharman Cup final. In 2017 they were competitive in many matches but failed to convert this into wins. They were relegated back to the Sharman Cup and in 2018 were forced to rebuild after losing many of their players to other teams. Former Te Atatu player Lawrence Tagaloa was appointed head coach. They finished the season with a 7–7 record and lost to New Lynn in the Sharman Cup championship final. 2019 saw another change with new coaches (Keith Hanley and Phil Gordon) appointed and many new additions to the team. The 2022 season saw Phil Gordan in charge again as head coach after he had assumed sole responsibility in 2021. Te Atatu had one of their better seasons for over a decade and qualified 3rd in section 2 which included 10 sides with a 7 win, 2 loss record. They then thrashed Mangere East 62-6 in the quarterfinal before losing to eventual finalists Glenora 26-12. In 2023 they finished 8th out of 14 teams in the Fox Memorial competition. They beat Glenora 32-6 in the semi final of the Plate competition before losing to Mount Albert in the final 22-16.

In 2024 Te Atatu had a new coaching regime which changed several times during the season before settling on Lila Vaivai. They won the Denis Williams Cup from Glenora for the first time in over a decade and then on July 6 they defeated Point Chevalier Pirates 26-22 to win the Roope Rooster trophy for the first time since 2006.

| Year | Trophy |
|---|---|
| 1968 | Gillette Cup |
| 1970 | Sharman Cup |
| 1973 | Sharman Cup |
| 1974 | Sharman Cup & Gillette Cup |
| 1976 | Sharman Cup |
| 1978 | Sharman Cup |
| 1986 | Rukutai Shield, National Club Championship & Kiwi Shield |
| 1988 | Fox Memorial, National Club Championship & Kiwi Shield |
| 2007 | Roope Rooster |
| 2015 | Phelan Shield |
| 2016 | Phelan Shield & Sharman Cup |
| 2024 | Dennis Williams Cup, Roope Rooster |

== Current season and season finishing positions ==
=== Men's season records 1988–94, 2003, 2009–2024 ===
| Year | Competition | Pld | W | D | L | PF | PA | PD | Pts | Position/Notes |
|---|---|---|---|---|---|---|---|---|---|---|
| 1988 | Lion Red Rukutai Shield | 14 | 9 | 0 | 5 | 296 | 302 | 98.01% | 18 | 3rd of 8 |
| | Playoffs | 2 | 2 | 0 | 0 | 22 | 16 | - | - | W v Glenora in GF 22-16 |
| 1989 | Lion Red Rukutai Shield | 14 | 7 | 1 | 6 | 373 | 272 | 137.1% | 15 | 4th of 8 |
| | Playoffs | 2 | 1 | 0 | 1 | 36 | 48 | - | - | W v Otahuhu 26-24 in minor SF, L v Mangere East 12-30 |
| 1990 | Lion Red Premiership Div 1 | 21 | 12 | 2 | 7 | 421 | 430 | 97.9% | 26 | 2nd of 10 |
| 1990 | Lion Red Premiership Div 1 | 21 | 12 | 2 | 7 | 421 | 430 | 97.9% | 26 | 2nd of 10 |
| | Playoffs | 2 | 1 | 0 | 1 | 36 | 48 | - | - | W v Northcote in Major SF 22-20, L v Ōtāhuhu in Grand Final 14-28 |
| 1991 | Lion Red Premiership Div 1 | 18 | 7 | 0 | 11 | 350 | 397 | 88.2% | 14 | 7th of 10 |
| 1992 | Lion Red Premiership Div 1 | 18 | 13 | 0 | 5 | 399 | 316 | 126.3% | 26 | 3rd of 10 |
| | Playoffs | 2 | 0 | 0 | 2 | ? | ? | - | - | L v Ōtāhuhu in SF, L v Northcote in SF |
| 1993 | Lion Red Premiership Div 1 | 18 | 9 | 1 | 8 | 378 | 342 | 110.5 | 19 | 5th of 10 |
| | Playoffs | 4 | 3 | 0 | 1 | 95 | 71 | - | - | W v Māngere East 31-8, W v Manukau 22-6, W v Richmond 32-28, L v Northcote 10-29 in the Grand Final |
| 1994 | Lion Red Premiership Div 1 | 22 | 12 | 1 | 9 | 507 | 485 | 25 | 104.5% | 5th of 12 |
| | Playoffs | 1 | 0 | 0 | 1 | ? | ? | - | - | L v City-Pt Chevalier in a midweek playoff after they tied for 5th |
| 1995 | Lion Red Rukutai Shield | 24 | 9 | 1 | 14 | 532 | 634 | 23 | 83.9% | 9th of 13 |
| 1996 | Lion Red Preliminary Round | 13 | 3 | 0 | 10 | 266 | 317 | 6 | 83.9% | 12th of 14 |
| 1997 | Lion Red Super 10 | 18 | 5 | 1 | 12 | 394 | 555 | 71% | 11 | 9th of 10 |
| 1998 | Lion Red Super 10 | 18 | 4 | 0 | 14 | 367 | 617 | 59.5% | 8 | 8th of 10 |
| 1999 | Rukutai Shield Super 12 | 22 | 6 | 1 | 15 | 465 | 686 | 67.8% | 13 | 9th of 12 |
| 2000 | Mad Butcher Fox Memorial Top 8 | 14 | 10 | 0 | 4 | 446 | 326 | 136.8% | 20 | 3rd of 8 |
| 2000 | Playoffs | 2 | 1 | 0 | 1 | 40 | 28 | 142.9% | - | W 8-24 v Northcote in Minor SF, L 16-20 v Richmond in Major SF |
| 2001 | Mad Butcher Fox Memorial Top 8 | 14 | 2 | 0 | 12 | 385 | 452 | 85.2% | 6 | 8th of 8 |
| 2003 | Sharman Cup | 14 | 7 | 0 | 7 | - | - | - | 14 | 4th of 10, L v Northcote in elim SF 18-20 |
| 2004 | Sharman Cup | 14 | 8 | 0 | 6 | 434 | 301 | 144.2% | 16 | 4th of 8 |
| 2004 | Playoffs | 3 | 2 | 0 | 1 | 69 | 55 | - | - | W 28-10 v Glenora in Minor Final, W 21-16 v Howick in Major SF, L 20-24 v Manukau in Final |
| 2009 | Fox Qualification | 7 | 4 | 0 | 3 | - | - | - | 8 | 4th of 8, Qual for Fox Memorial |
| 2009 | Fox Memorial | 14 | 3 | 0 | 11 | - | - | - | 6 | 7th of 8, Zensei Inu (ARL Standoff of the Year), Zac Tippins (ARL Hooker of the Year), Stephen Shennan (ARL Rookie of the Year) |
| 2010 | Fox Qualification | 7 | 4 | 0 | 3 | 228 | 158 | +144 | 8 | 4th of 8, Qualified for Fox Memorial |
| 2010 | Fox Memorial | 14 | 8 | 0 | 6 | 412 | 332 | +124 | 16 | 4th of 8, W v Howick 26-8 in Minor Final, L v Otahuhu 14-28 in prel final |
| 2011 | Sharman Cup | 14 | 7 | 1 | 6 | 412 | 294 | +140 | 15 | 4th of 8, L v Mangere East 16-19 in minor final |
| 2012 | Sharman Cup | 18 | 7 | 2 | 9 | 379 | 524 | -145 | 16 | 7th of 10 |
| 2013 | Sharman Cup | 18 | 4 | 1 | 13 | 412 | 533 | -121 | 9 | 9th of 10 |
| 2014 | Sharman Cup | 18 | 2 | 0 | 16 | 290 | 723 | -523 | 4 | 9th of 10, Sala Falelua (Sharman Cup Player of the Year), Bill Norrie (ARL Volunteer of the Year) |
| 2015 | Sharman Cup | 17 | 15 | 1 | 1 | 826 | 277 | +549 | 4 | 1st of 15, W v Ellerslie 26–22 in minor final, W v Bay Roskill 32–26 in major final, L v Richmond 16–45 in GF |
| 2016 | Sharman Cup | 17 | 15 | 1 | 0 | 706 | 186 | +520 | 29* | 1st of 15, * -2 pts for a rule breach, L v Waitemata 14–21 in QF, W v Hibiscus Coast 54–18 in SF, W v Ellerslie 42–12 in major final, W v Bay Roskill 31–22 in GF |
| 2017 | Fox Memorial | 18 | 3 | 1 | 14 | 289 | 510 | -221 | 7 | 10th of 10, Johnny Falelua (ARL Rookie of the Year) |
| 2018 | Sharman Cup | 15 | 6 | 1 | 8 | 308 | 285 | +23 | 14 | 10th of 14, W v Pakuranga 30–6 in SF, L v New Lynn 24–29 in GF |
| 2019 | Fox Qualifiers | 12 | 11 | 1 | 1 | 548 | 179 | +322 | 24 | 1st of 13, Qualified 1st including 10 game winning streak (rounds 3-12) |
| 2019 | Fox Championship | 7 | 5 | 0 | 2 | 214 | 140 | +74 | 10 | 1st of 8, Qualified 1st, W v Papakura in Major SF 23-22 (aet, L v Papakura in GF 8-38. |
| 2020 | Fox Memorial | 8 | 2 | 0 | 6 | 176 | 198 | -22 | 4 | 9th of 12, season cancelled after 8 rounds due to covid-19 |
| 2021 | Fox Qualifiers | 11 | 2 | 1 | 8 | 252 | 368 | -116 | 5 | 10th of 12 |
| | Fox Championship | 6 | 3 | 0 | 3 | 172 | 90 | +82 | 6 | 4th of 8 |
| 2022 | Fox Memorial (section 2) | 9 | 7 | 0 | 2 | 438 | 121 | +317 | 14 | 3rd of 10 in sect 2, W v Mangere East 62-6 in Prel. final, L v Glenora 26-12 in QF |
| 2023 | Fox Qualifiers | 3 | 1 | 0 | 2 | 102 | 76 | 134.3% | 2 | 2nd of 4 |
| | Fox Memorial | 11 | 4 | 0 | 7 | 192 | 205 | 93-66 | 8 | 8th of 12 |
| | Fox Plate Playoffs | 2 | 1 | 0 | 1 | 48 | 28 | - | - | W v Glenora in SF 32-6, L v Mt Albert in GF 16-22 |
| 2024 | Fox Qualifiers | 3 | 3 | 0 | 0 | 122 | 34 | +88 | 6 | |
| 2024 | Fox Memorial | 11 | 9 | 0 | 2 | 348 | 156 | +192 | 18 | 3rd of 12 |
| 2024 | Playoffs | 2 | 1 | 0 | 1 | 42 | 30 | +12 | - | W v Mt Albert 22-10 in SF, L v Papakura 20-24 in Prel. final |
| 1988-2004, 2003, 2009-2024 | TOTAL | 573 | 269 | 18 | 286 | 13,689 | 12,545 | - | 467 | Includes playoff results |

=== Women's season records ===
| Year | Competition | Pld | W | BYE | D | L | PF | PA | PD | Pts | Position (Teams) | Notes |
|---|---|---|---|---|---|---|---|---|---|---|---|---|
| 2016 | Women's Pennant | 5 | 2 | 1 | 1 | 1 | 150 | 40 | +190 | 7 | 2nd of 5 | W v Pt Chevalier 18–14 in SF, L v Mangere East 22–26 in the Championship Final |
| 2017 | Women's Pennant | 8 | 5 | 2 | 0 | 1 | 272 | 82 | +190 | 14 | 1st of 5 | |
| 2018 | Women's Championship | 5 | 0 | 1 | 0 | 4 | 54 | 238 | -134 | 2 | 5th of 5 | |
| 2019 | Women's Championship | 7 | 6 | 0 | 0 | 1 | 260 | 130 | +130 | 12 | 1st of 8 | W v Glenora 32-24 in the championship SF, W v Manukau 10-8 in the grand final |

== Notable past players ==
Te Atatu's first Kiwi International was Dennis Williams in 1971. He went on to play 31 tests for New Zealand. The majority of the NZ representatives were to come from the late 1980s and early 1990s when the club experienced considerable success on the field With the likes of Peter Brown, Mark Elia, Mark Horo, Ron O'Regan, Dean Orr, and Sam Panapa in the side. In the early 1990s brothers Henry and Robbie Paul represented the Kiwi's though Robbie moved to play professionally in England at a young age and due to the difficulty for players from England being able to return to New Zealand or Australia for tests he did not represent New Zealand as many times as he would undoubtedly have. His brother Henry Paul also moved to play professionally in England and he later switched codes representing England in rugby union, and in Rugby Sevens. He was not the only Te Atatu Rooster to represent another country in Rugby Union. Shontayne Hape switched codes and was selected for the full English international side who he represented 13 times, and more recently James O'Connor who was a Te Atatu Schoolboy was selected for the Wallabies, the Australia national rugby union team.

=== New Zealand representatives ===
Kiwis

- Peter Brown (16 tests)
- Mark Elia (37 tests)
- Shontayne Hape (14 tests)
- Mark Horo (16 tests)
- Suaia Matagi (1 test)
- Ron O'Regan (8 tests)
- Dean Orr (1 test)
- Sam Panapa (8 tests)
- Henry Paul (24 tests)
- Robbie Paul (29 tests)
- John Smith (12 tests)
- Dennis Williams (31 tests)
- John Wilson (2 tests)

NZ Maori

- David Bailey
- Mark Horo
- Ron O'Regan
- Terry O'Shea
- Dennis Williams
- John Smith
- John Wilson

Junior Kiwis

- Taime Tagaloa
- Henry Paul (c)

NZ Under 19s

- Terry O'Shea
- Mark Elia

NZ Secondary Schools

- Shontayne Hape

NZ Under 16s

- Dean Orr
- Benjamen Vai

NZ Universities

- Graeme Murdoch (5 tests)

New Zealand Defence Force

- Parata Ainsley
- Beufa Brown
- Peter Lincoln
- Trevor Baker

Auckland

- David Bailey
- Allen Cunningham
- Shane Horo
- Michael Kini
- Carl Magatogia
- Neville Ramsey
- Phil Robards
- Iva Ropati
- Peter Ropati
- Wayne Robertson
- Mike Smith
- Shaun Tempest
- Jim Denyer

=== NRL ===
New Zealand Warriors

- Mark Horo (36 games)
- Iva Ropati (7 games)
- David Bailey (3 games)
- Patrick Ah Van (54 games)
- Shontayne Hape (28 games)
- Suaia Matagi (36 games)
- Isaiah Papali'i (63 games)

NZ Warriors U20s

- Peter Mills (2009)
- Zensei Inu (2010)
- Stephen Shennan (2011)

NZ Warriors Jersey Flegg (21 & Under)

- Robin Herbert (2024)

Canterbury Bulldogs

- Mark Elia (9 games)

Gold Coast Titans

- Paterika Vaivai (10 games)

Newcastle Knights

- Paterika Vaivai (6 games)
- Suaia Matagi (7 games)

Parramatta Eels

- Mark Horo (62 games)
- Isaiah Papali'i (45 games)
- Iva Ropati (4 games)
- Api Pewhairangi (4 games)
- Suaia Matagi (35 games)

Penrith Panthers

- Suaia Matagi (23 games)

Sydney Roosters

- Suaia Matagi (7 games)

Western Suburbs

- Mark Horo

Wests Tigers

- Reuben Porter (1 game)

=== New South Wales cup ===
New Zealand Warriors (NSW Cup)

- Paterika Vaivai (7 games)

=== Super League (England) ===
Bradford Bulls

- Patrick Ah Van (28 games)
- Robbie Paul (241 games)
- Shontayne Hape (136 games)

Castleford Tigers

- Shane Horo (18 games)

Featherstone Rovers

- Iva Ropati

Halifax R.L.F.C.

- Peter Brown
- Mark Elia

Huddersfield Giants

- Suaia Matagi (28 games)
- Robbie Paul (52 games)

Hunslet

- Peter Brown

Kent Invicta

- Mark Elia (34 games)

Leeds

- Peter Brown

Leigh Centurions

- Peter Brown
- Shane Horo
- Peter Ropati
- Robbie Paul (38 games)

Oldham RLFC

- Iva Ropati

Rochdale Hornets

- David Bailey

Salford Red Devils

- Peter Brown (16 games)
- Robbie Paul (27 games)
- Mark Horo (20 games)
- Sam Panapa (71 games)

Sheffield Eagles

- Sam Panapa (38 games)

St Helens R.F.C.

- Mark Elia (70 games)
- Iva Ropati

Wigan

- Sam Panapa (119 games)

Wakefield Trinity

- David Bailey

Widnes Vikings

- Patrick Ah Van (118 games)
- Mark Elia

Harlequins

- Robbie Paul (10 games)

=== International Rugby League and Rugby Union ===
Australia

- James O'Connor (44 tests)

England

- Henry Paul (6 tests)
- Shontayne Hape (13 tests)

Romania

- Stephen Shennan (17 tests)*

Samoa

- Mark Elia (2 tests)
- Sam Panapa (2 tests)
- Patrick Ah Van (1 test)
- Suaia Matagi (7 tests)
- Malo Solomona (5 tests)
- Isaiah Papali'i (1 test)

Fiji

- Fred Robarts (3 tests)

Tokelau

- Sam Panapa
