= Chris Matagi =

New Zealand rugby league footballer

Personal information
- Full name: Christopher Matagi
- Born: 24 July 2007 (age 19)
- Height: 178 cm (5 ft 10 in)
- Weight: 104 kg (16 st 5 lb)

Playing information
- Position: Prop
Club
Years	Team	Pld	T	G	FG	P
2026	St Helens	7	0	0	0	0
2027–	Cronulla Sharks	0	0	0	0	0
	Total	7	0	0	0	0
- Source: As of 9 November 2026
- Father: Suaia Matagi

Chris Matagi is a New Zealand professional rugby league footballer who plays as a prop for the Cronulla Sharks in the National Rugby League.

He previously played for St Helens in the Super League.

== Background ==
He is the son of former New Zealand and Samoa international Suaia Matagi. He played his junior rugby league for Siddal.

== Career ==
He made his Super League debut for St Helens in their round 18, 46–0 loss to Toulouse Olympique.
