= Mangere East Hawks =

NZ rugby league club, based in Māngere

Club information
- Full name: Mangere East Rugby League Club
- Founded: 1963; 63 years ago

Current details
- Ground: Walter Massey Park
- Coach: Richard Blackmore 2020

Records
- Premierships: 2003
- Minor premierships: 1987, 1997, 2002, 2004
- Roope Rooster: 1989, 1998
- Stormont Shield: 2006
- Sharman Cup: 1975, 1982, 2012

The Mangere East Hawks are a rugby league club based in Māngere, New Zealand. The Hawks compete in Auckland Rugby League's Fox Memorial competition.

== History ==
The club was formed in 1963, the first fourteen junior teams took the field in 1964. Before this, teams from the area had been attached to the Otahuhu club.

In 1969 the club won the Senior B championship and the Norton Cup and were promoted to play in the Auckland Rugby League's premier grade the following season.

In 1971 the club was able to afford a $50,000, 6000sq ft club house which was built at Walter Massey Park, the club's home ground since its foundation.

The club adopted the nickname "The Hawks" in 1973, after forming a sister club partnership with the Ryde-Eastwood Hawks in Sydney. They were one of the first clubs in Auckland to adopt a nickname.

In 1977 Olsen Filipaina became the first Hawks junior to represent his country and in 1978 the club, coached by Ernie Wiggs, made its first Fox Memorial grand final, being defeated by Otahuhu.

OPn 29 June 1991 five of the Ropati brothers; Tea, Iva, John, Joe and Peter all played together for the Mangere East senior side.

In 2003, the club's 40th jubilee season, the Hawks won their first Fox Memorial title.

== Notable players ==
Other notable former players include;

- Olsen Filipaina (1980-87 Balmain Tigers, Eastern Suburbs & North Sydney Bears)
- Joe Ropati (1986-89 Warrington Wolves & Manly Sea Eagles)
- Shane Cooper (1987-97 St. Helens & Widnes Vikings)
- George Mann (1988-00 Newcastle Knights, St. Helens & Leeds Rhinos)
- Tea Ropati (1988-98 Newcastle Knights, Auckland Warriors & Leeds Rhinos)
- Brian Laumatia (1995-97 Cronulla Sharks)
- Iva Ropati (1994-97 Parramatta Eels & Auckland Warriors)
- Lesley Vainikolo (1997-07 Canberra Raiders & Bradford Bulls)
- Jerry Seuseu (1997-06 New Zealand Warriors & Wigan Warriors)
- Ali Lauitiiti (1998-2014 New Zealand Warriors, Leeds Rhinos & Wakefield Trinity)
- Jonathan Smith (2000-01 New Zealand Warriors)
- Jeff Lima (2004-17 West Tigers, Melbourne Storm Wigan Warriors South Sydney Catalan Dragons& Canberra Raiders)
- George Tuakura (2005-07 New Zealand Warriors)
- Kim Uasi (2006-09 Tonga)
- Frank-Paul Nu'uausala (2007-17 Sydney Roosters, Wigan Warriors & Canberra Raiders)
- Sonny Fai (2008 New Zealand Warriors)
- Sam Moa (2008- Cronulla Sharks, Hull F.C. & Sydney Roosters)
- Sebastine Ikahihifo (2012- New Zealand Warriors)
- Mataupu Poching (2010 New Zealand Warriors)
- Nafe Seluini (2010-13 Penrith Panthers & Sydney Roosters)
- Jason Taumalolo (2010- North Queensland Cowboys)
- Marvin Filipo (2011- 12 Newcastle Knights)
- Peni Terepo (2013- Parramatta Eels)
- Agnatius Paasi (2014- New Zealand Warriors, Gold Coast Titans & St Helens R.F.C.)
- Albert Vete (2014- New Zealand Warriors Melbourne Storm)
- Herman Ese'ese (2015- Canterbury Bulldogs, Brisbane Broncos, Newcastle Knights Gold Coast Titans)
- Ken Maumalo (2015- New Zealand Warriors, New Zealand Kiwis & Toa Samoa)
- Francis Tualau (2016-17 Canterbury Bulldogs)
- Zane Musgrove (2016- South Sydney, West Tigers)
- Marata Niukore (2018- Parramatta Eels)
- Ofahiki Ogden (2018- Canterbury Bulldogs), Parramatta Eels
- Edward Kosi (2021- New Zealand Warriors)
- Greg Marzhew (2021 - Gold Coast Titans)
- Falakiko Manu (2021 - Canterbury Bulldogs)
- Leka Halasima (2024 - New Zealand Warriors)
- Robert Toia (2025 - Sydney Roosters)
- Peter Leitch a.k.a. "The Mad Butcher" is a noted fan of the club.
