= Tea Ropati =

New Zealand & Samoa international rugby league footballer

Personal information
- Full name: Tea Faa'tea Ropati
- Born: 7 September 1964 (age 62) Auckland, New Zealand

Playing information
- Height: 183 cm (6 ft 0 in)
- Weight: 93 kg (14 st 9 lb)
- Position: Centre, Five-eighth
Club
Years	Team	Pld	T	G	FG	P
	Otahuhu Leopards	2
1988	Newcastle Knights	2	0	1	0	2
1989–94	St Helens	132	56	24	2	352
1991	Mangere East Hawks
1995–98	Auckland Warriors	72	26	0	0	104
	Total	208	82	25	2	458
Representative
Years	Team	Pld	T	G	FG	P
	Auckland
1986–97	New Zealand	9	0	0	0	0
1994–96	Western Samoa	2	0	0	0	0
- Education: Otahuhu College
- Relatives: Joe Ropati (brother); Iva Ropati (brother); Peter Ropati (brother); Romi Ropati (brother)

Tea Faa'tea Ropati (born 7 September 1964) is a former professional rugby league footballer who represented New Zealand and Western Samoa.

== Background ==
Ropati was born in Auckland, New Zealand.

Ropati is a member of the large Ropati rugby league family that includes fellow league players Joe Ropati, John Ropati, Iva Ropati, union player Romi Ropati, and league commentator Peter Ropati.

== Early years ==
Ropati played for both the Mangere East Hawks and Otahuhu Leopards in the Auckland Rugby League competition. He was a Junior Kiwi in 1983.

During the 1987 season Ropati played for Auckland alongside three of his brothers; John, Joe and Peter.

This feat was bettered in the 1991 season when all four of them, plus brother Iva, twice lined up for Mangere East in the Auckland Rugby League competition.

== Playing career ==
Ropati started his professional career with the Newcastle Knights in 1988 before moving to England. Playing for St. Helens he made a name for himself as a centre/five eighth who kicked goals. He also won the 1992/3 British First Division player of the year award.

During the 1991–92 season he played in St. Helens' 24–14 victory over Rochdale Hornets in the 1991 Lancashire Cup Final at Wilderspool Stadium, Warrington, on 20 October 1991. During the 1992–93 season he played at Stand-off in the 4–5 defeat by Wigan in the 1992 Lancashire Cup Final at Knowsley Road, St. Helens, on 18 October 1992.

In 1995 he returned home to join the new Auckland Warriors in the first Australian Rugby League premiership. He was the Warriors' player of the year in 1995. He stayed with the Warriors for four seasons before retiring after the 1998 season.

Ropati represented the New Zealand national rugby league team from 1986 to 1997 and also played for Western Samoa at the 1995 Rugby League World Cup.

== Later years ==
Ropati participated in the charity boxing event Fight for Life on several occasions during the early 2000s.

In 2010 Ropati was the assistant coach for the Mangere East Hawks in the Auckland Rugby League competition.

== Rape trial ==
On 21 January 2008 Ropati began a trial in Auckland after being accused of rape and unlawful sexual connection, to which he pleaded not guilty. The woman stated she awoke in a car near Victoria Park. "I remember coming to. I remember an angry face over me. It was an angry, twisted face. I remember being in pain." Ropati was married at the time, and although he admitted the sexual connection he stated that it was consensual.

On 31 January 2008 a jury found him not guilty on all six charges. Multiple rugby league personalities defended the character of Ropati in court including the Mad Butcher Peter Leitch.
