= Khoro (rural locality) =

Khoro (Russian: Хоро) is the name of several rural localities in the Sakha Republic, Russia:

- Khoro, Suntarsky District, Sakha Republic, a selo in Khorinsky Rural Okrug of Suntarsky District
- Khoro, Verkhnevilyuysky District, Sakha Republic, a selo in Khorinsky Rural Okrug of Verkhnevilyuysky District
