= Peter Ropati =

New Zealand rugby league footballer and commentator

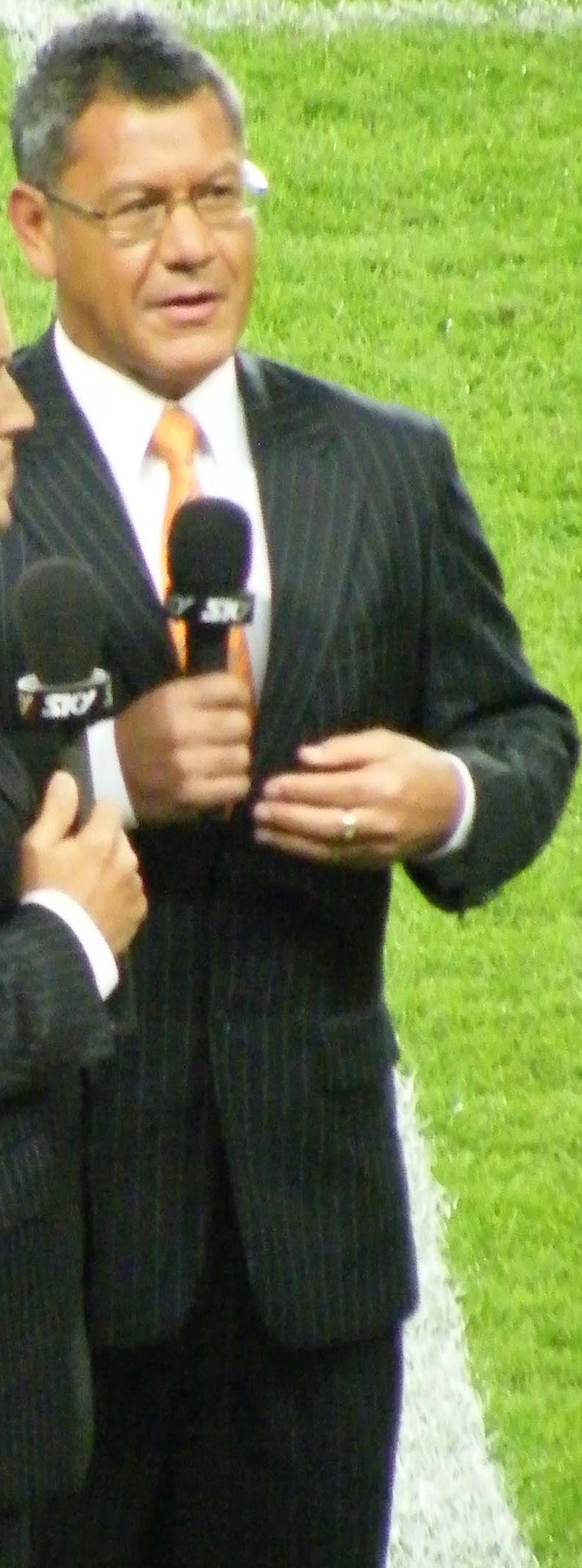

Personal information
- Born: Auckland, New Zealand

Playing information
- Position: Prop
Club
| Years | Team | Pld | T | G | FG | P |
|---|---|---|---|---|---|---|
| | Otahuhu |
| | Te Atatu |
| 1989–90 | Leigh | 83 | 19 | 0 | 0 | 76 |
| 1991 | Mangere East |
| | Total | 83 | 19 | 0 | 0 | 76 |
Representative
| Years | Team | Pld | T | G | FG | P |
| 1986–91 | Auckland |
- Education: Otahuhu College
- Relatives: Joe Ropati (brother); Iva Ropati (brother); Romi Ropati (brother); Tea Ropati (brother)

Peter Ropati is a New Zealand former rugby league footballer and commentator who played as a professional for Leigh.

Ropati is from a large rugby league family that includes brothers Joe, Iva, Tea and Romi.

== Playing career ==
Ropati began playing for the Otahuhu Leopards in the Auckland Rugby League competition. He made the Auckland side in 1986 and was selected for the New Zealand XIII in 1987.

In 1988 Ropati was part of the Te Atatu Roosters side that won the Fox Memorial grand final for the first time. He moved to England in 1989, playing for the Leigh Centurions.

In 1991 Ropati returned to New Zealand for his brother Tea's wedding. On the 29 June he played alongside four of his brothers, Joe, John, Tea and Iva Ropati, for the Mangere East Hawks. It was the only time all five brothers played in the same team.

== Later years ==
Ropati later became a rugby league commentator and fronted Sky Network Television's rugby league coverage for 15 years before being removed in 2010.
