= Joe Ropati =

New Zealand international rugby league footballer

Personal information
- Full name: Joseph Ropati
- Born: Auckland, New Zealand

Playing information
- Position: Wing, Centre
Club
Years	Team	Pld	T	G	FG	P
	Otahuhu Leopards
1986–90	Warrington
1988–89	Manly Sea Eagles	21	1	0	0	4
1991	Mangere East Hawks
	Total	21	1	0	0	4
Representative
Years	Team	Pld	T	G	FG	P
1982–87	Auckland
	New Zealand Māori
1983–86	New Zealand	13	3	3	0	18
- Relatives: Iva Ropati (brother); Peter Ropati (brother); Romi Ropati (brother); Tea Ropati (brother)

Joseph Ropati is a New Zealand former professional rugby league footballer who represented New Zealand in thirteen test matches, including in games that counted towards the 1988 World Cup. Ropati is part of a large rugby league family that includes internationals Iva, Peter, Tea and rugby union international Romi. Joe, Tea and Iva are the only set of three brothers to play test matches for the Kiwis.

== Playing career ==
Ropati began his career playing in the Auckland Rugby League competition for the Otahuhu Leopards. Between 1982 and 1985 Ropati represented Auckland and also represented New Zealand Māori. In 1983 Ropati won the ARL's award for the most improved back and in 1985 he won the Tetley Trophy as the leading try scorer.

He toured the United Kingdom in 1983 with the New Zealand Māori side.

Ropati played in thirteen test matches for the New Zealand national rugby league team between 1983 and 1986.

In 1986 Ropati moved to England, joining Warrington. He stayed with Warrington for four seasons.

Ropati played at centre in Warrington's 4–18 defeat by Wigan in the 1986–87 John Player Special Trophy Final during the 1986–87 season at Burnden Park, Bolton on Saturday 10 January 1987.

Ropati played at centre and scored a try in Warrington's 24–16 victory over Oldham in the 1989 Lancashire Cup Final during the 1989–90 season at Knowsley Road, St. Helens on Saturday 14 October 1989.

Ropati also played for the Manly Sea Eagles for two seasons, playing in 21 first grade matches.
