= Iva Ropati =

NZ international rugby league footballer

Personal information
- Full name: Iva Lewis Ropati
- Born: 18 July 1968 (age 57) Auckland, New Zealand

Playing information
- Position: Centre
Club
Years	Team	Pld	T	G	FG	P
1989–90	Featherstone Rovers	26	15	0	0	60
1991–92	Sheffield Eagles	27	30	0	0	120
1992–93	Oldham	36	25	0	0	100
1993–94	Featherstone Rovers	30	16	0	0	64
1994	Parramatta Eels	4	2	0	0	8
1996–97	Auckland Warriors	7	3	0	0	12
	Total	130	91	0	0	364
Representative
Years	Team	Pld	T	G	FG	P
	Taranaki
	Auckland
1993	New Zealand	4	2	0	0	8
- Education: Lynfield College; Otahuhu College
- Relatives: Joe Ropati (brother); Peter Ropati (brother); Romi Ropati (brother); Tea Ropati (brother)

Iva Lewis Ropati is a New Zealand former professional rugby league footballer who played in the 1980s and 1990s, and high school principal. He played at representative level for New Zealand, Auckland and Taranaki, and at club level for the Otahuhu Leopards, the Te Atatu Roosters, the Mangere East Hawks, the Sheffield Eagles, Featherstone Rovers, Oldham, the Parramatta Eels, the Auckland Warriors and the Manurewa Marlins, as a centre.

== Early life ==
Ropati attended Lynfield College in Auckland.

== Playing career ==
=== Early years ===
He grew up playing for the Otahuhu Leopards before moving to the Te Atatu Roosters where he won a Fox Memorial premiership. He later played for the Mangere East Hawks before moving to England. During the 1991 season Iva was able to twice line up alongside four of his brothers for Mangere East in the Auckland Rugby League competition. Iva played alongside Joe, John, Peter, and Tea.

=== Professional career ===
When he moved to England, Ropati played for the Sheffield Eagles, Featherstone Rovers and Oldham. Iva Ropati played at centre and scored a try in Featherstone Rovers' 14–20 defeat by Bradford Northern in the 1989 Yorkshire Cup Final during the 1989–90 season at Headingley, Leeds on Sunday 5 November 1989. He scored 30 tries for Sheffield in the 1991–92 season, which remained a club record until it was broken in 2012. He spent the 1992–93 season with Oldham, but was released in August 1993 so the club could make room in their overseas quota for new signing Bob Lindner. He re-joined Featherstone Rovers in November 1993.

In 1994, he moved to Australia to play for the Parramatta Eels in the NSWRL premiership. Ropati played four games for Parramatta but broke his leg in round 11 of the 1994 NSWRL season against Cronulla and never played for the club again. He finished his career with the new Auckland Warriors side in 1996 and 1997. In 1998 he returned to the Auckland Rugby League competition, playing with the Manurewa Marlins. As an import player, he represented Taranaki in the 1998 National Provincial Competition.

== Representative career ==
In 1993 Ropati was selected for the New Zealand national rugby league team, playing in four Test matches during the 1993 Kiwis tour.

== Later years ==
Ropati was one of six New Zealanders awarded a Sir Peter Blake emerging leadership award in 2009.

In 2009 he was appointed to the new Counties Manukau Zone board after the restructuring of the New Zealand Rugby League. He was nominated to serve on the New Zealand Rugby League board in 2012 as an independent director.

In 2003, Ropati was appointed Principal of Penrose High School (now One Tree Hill College), having previously served as Deputy Principal. In 2010, Ropati joined Howick College as Principal. After spending 12 years at Howick College, in 2022 Ropati left the school to start a new position as Principal at Tauranga's Papamoa College.

== Family ==
His family is famous in rugby league circles and includes brothers Joe, Peter, Tea and Romi. He now has a family of 4, married to Kerrie Lee Ropati with two daughters Olivia Nancy Ropati and Georgia Lee Ropati.
