= Shane Horo =

New Zealand rugby league footballer

Personal information
- Full name: Shane Heta Horo
- Born: 19 May 1960 (age 65) New Zealand

Playing information
- Position: Wing
Club
Years	Team	Pld	T	G	FG	P
19??–85	Hamilton City Tigers(WRL)
1984	Unknown (NRL)
1986	Te Atatu Roosters
1987	Northcote Tigers
1987–88	Leigh Centurions	15	9	0	0	36
1988–89	Castleford Tigers	18	11	0	0	44
1990–91	Whitehaven RLFC	30	15	0	0	60
	Total	63	35	0	0	140
Representative
Years	Team	Pld	T	G	FG	P
19??–85	Waikato
1984	Northland
1985–88	New Zealand	3	3	0	0	12
1986–??	Auckland
- Relatives: Mark Horo (brother); Justin Horo (nephew)

Shane Horo is a New Zealand rugby league player who represented New Zealand in the 1988 World Cup. His brother, Mark, was also a New Zealand international and his nephew, Justin, formerly played in the NRL.

== Playing career ==
Horo originally played in the Waikato Rugby League and represented Waikato. In 1985 he was selected for the New Zealand national rugby league team but did not play a Test Match. He spent the 1984 season in the Northland Rugby League competition and represented Northland.

He then moved to Auckland and competed in the Auckland Rugby League. In 1986, while playing for the Te Atatu Roosters, he won the ARL's Tetley Trophy after scoring the most tries in the competition. Horo later moved to the Northcote Tigers and represented Auckland. He played in three Test Matches for the New Zealand national rugby league team between 1987 and 1988.

Horo spent two seasons in England, playing for the Leigh Centurions in the 1987/88 season and the Castleford Tigers in the 1988/89 season where he played 18 game and scored 11 tries.
