= Mark Horo =

NZ and NZ Māori international rugby league footballer and coach

Personal information
- Full name: Mark Gregory Horo
- Born: 27 March 1963 (age 63)

Playing information
- Position: Second-row
Club
Years	Team	Pld	T	G	FG	P
	Te Atatu Roosters
1988–89	Salford	20	4	0	0	16
1990–94	Parramatta Eels	62	6	0	0	24
1995	Western Suburbs	22	2	0	0	8
1996–97	Auckland Warriors	36	4	0	0	16
	Total	140	16	0	0	64
Representative
Years	Team	Pld	T	G	FG	P
19??–85	Waikato
19??–85	Northern Districts
1986–89	Auckland
1986–88	New Zealand Māori
1987–96	New Zealand	16	1	0	0	4

Coaching information
Representative
Years	Team	Gms	W	D	L	W%
1986–88	New Zealand Māori	0	0	0	0
2018	New Zealand Māori	0	0	0	0
- Relatives: Shane Horo (brother); Justin Horo (son)

Mark Gregory Horo (born 27 March 1963) is a New Zealand rugby league coach and former footballer who played in the 1980s and 1990s. A New Zealand international representative, he played club football in New Zealand for Te Atatu and in Australia for Parramatta and Wests before finishing his career back in Auckland with the Warriors. Horo coached in New South Wales and is the co-coach of the New Zealand Māori team.

== Background ==
His eldest son Justin Horo played for Catalans Dragons & Wakefield Trinity in the Super League, Parramatta Eels & was part of the Manly-Warringah Sea Eagles team that played in the 2013 Grand Final loss to the Sydney Roosters.

== Playing career ==
Horo played at the 1985-1988 Rugby League World Cup and the 1995 Rugby League World Cup. In New Zealand he played for the Te Atatu Roosters in the Auckland Rugby League competition and he later represented the Parramatta Eels, Western Suburbs Magpies and the Auckland Warriors in Australian competitions. He played for the New Zealand Māori side at the 1986 Pacific Cup.

Horo played loose forward (replaced by substitute Mick McTigue) in Salford's 17–22 defeat by Wigan in the 1988 Lancashire Cup Final during the 1988–89 season at Knowsley Road, St. Helens on Sunday 23 October 1988.

Horo played 16 tests for the Kiwis over a ten-year period. He had stunning start to his international career starring in a 13-6 upset win over Australia. He held his Kiwi spot in 1988 with his brother Shane Horo playing in the 66-14 win over Papua New Guinea and the 12-10 win over Great Britain at the Addington Show Grounds in Christchurch. The following year he played against Australia before missing the 1989 Kiwi Tour.

Horo regained his Kiwi spot in 1990 under a new Kiwi coach, however for the next four seasons injuries and being out of favour with Kiwi coaches resulted in him not being selected, including missing the Kiwi tour in 1993 (hindsight suggests he and other shock omission Tony Iro should have been selected).

== After Parramatta ==
Having difficulties at Parramatta, Horo moved to Western Suburbs. Horo played superbly and in 1995 regained his test jersey playing in all three world cup internationals for the kiwis. Horo was signed by the warriors on a 2-year contract after which he retired.

Horo played his last international in 1996.

== Later years ==
Mark Horo previously coached the Erina Eagles of the Jim Beam Cup.

In 2010, Horo was the co-coach of the New Zealand Māori side with Richie Blackmore.

Horo now coaches the Penrith Panthers S.G. Ball Cup squad.

Horo is now coaching A Grade at Glenmore Park Brumbies J.R.L.F.C

== Sources ==
- Alan Whiticker & Glen Hudson (2007). The Encyclopedia of Rugby League Players. Wetherill Park, New South Wales: Gary Allen Pty Ltd. ISBN 978-1-877082-93-1.
