= Justin Horo =

New Zealand rugby league player (born 1986)

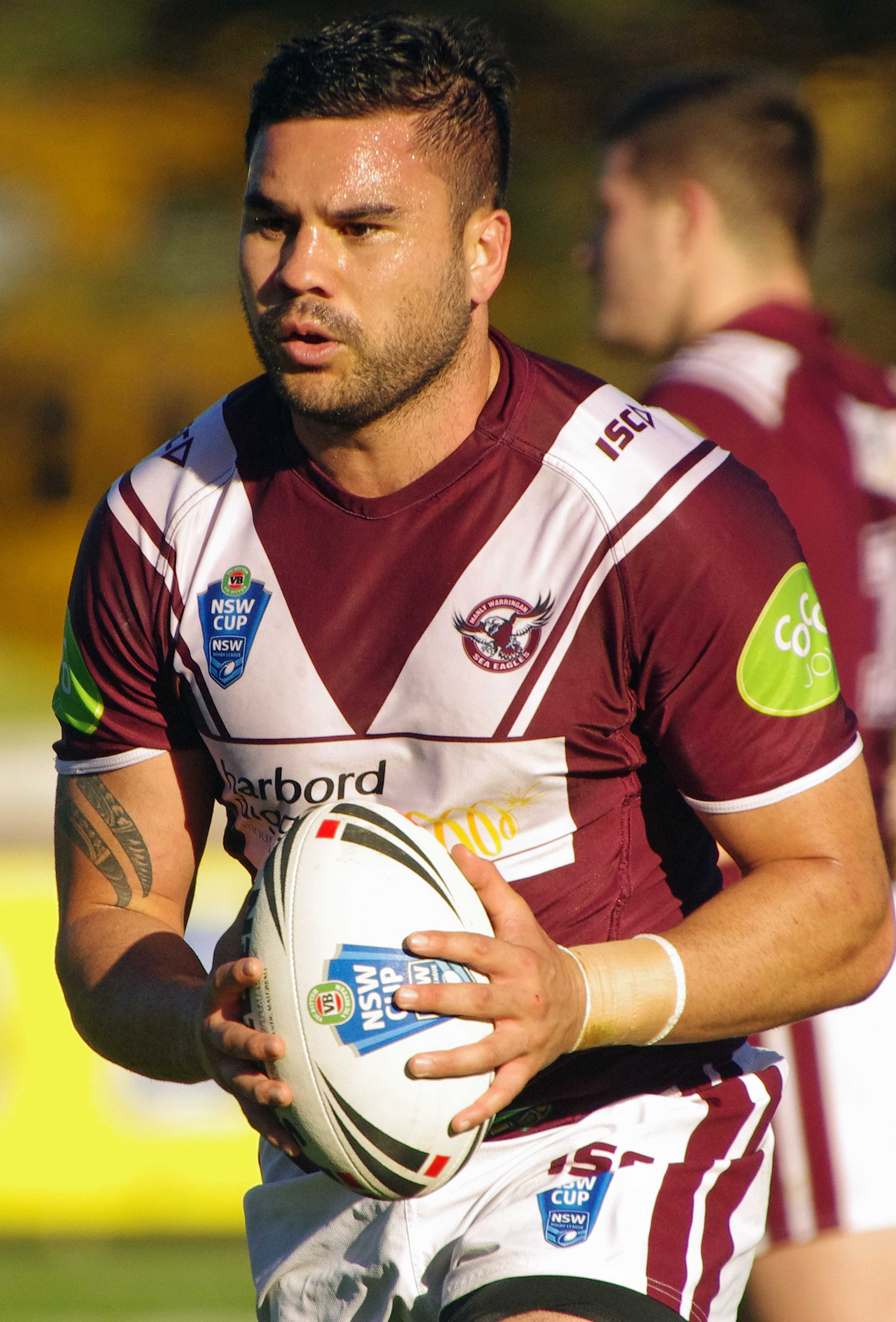

Personal information
- Born: 7 September 1986 (age 40) Auckland, New Zealand
- Height: 190 cm (6 ft 3 in)
- Weight: 100 kg (15 st 10 lb)

Playing information
- Position: Second-row, Lock, Centre
Club
Years	Team	Pld	T	G	FG	P
2010–12	Parramatta Eels	52	8	0	0	32
2013–15	Manly Sea Eagles	68	15	0	0	60
2016–17	Catalans Dragons	45	12	0	0	48
2018–19	Wakefield Trinity	38	7	0	0	28
	Total	203	42	0	0	168
Representative
Years	Team	Pld	T	G	FG	P
2010	New Zealand Māori	1	0	0	0	0
- Source: As of 19 May 2019
- Father: Mark Horo
- Relatives: Shane Horo (uncle)

Justin Horo (born 7 September 1986) is a retired New Zealand professional rugby league footballer who last played as a second-rower and lock for Wakefield Trinity in the Super League. He previously played for the Parramatta Eels and the Manly Warringah Sea Eagles in the NRL.

== Background ==
Born in Auckland, New Zealand, he is of Maori descent. His father, Mark Horo is New Zealand Maori and his mother is of Laos descent. His uncle is Shane Horo.

== Playing career ==
Horo played his junior football for the St Clair Comets and Cambridge Park, playing SG Ball & Jersey Flegg at the Sydney Roosters before signing with the Parramatta Eels.

In round 3 of the 2010 NRL season he made his NRL debut for the Parramatta Eels against the Wests Tigers. Later that year he re-signed with the Parramatta Eels on a three-year contract, knocking back offers from the Newcastle Knights, the North Queensland Cowboys and the Canterbury-Bankstown Bulldogs. After making his debut, Horo played in all the remaining games of the 2010 season and received the 2010 Parramatta Eels season's rookie of the year award.

Horo played throughout the 2011 season but in 2012 he was dropped from the Parramatta team after a first round loss, and featured in just six games for the year. Horo said, "Steve (Kearney) said I had a few things to work on and I ended up getting a few injuries after that. I tore ligaments in my ankle and then I had a rotator-cuff injury in my shoulder. Once I got back to full fitness I ended up stringing a few games together at the end but that was after Mooks had gone."

After being told he was not in Parramatta's future plans early in the 2012 season, Horo considered playing park football in France with a friend before ending up signing a two-year contract with the Manly-Warringah Sea Eagles on 12 November from the 2013 season, after being released from the final year of his Parramatta contract. In the 2013 season, he scored eight tries from 18 games (to round 20 including two byes), playing in the back row with representative forwards Anthony Watmough and Glenn Stewart. Horo played a total of 27 matches for Manly in the 2013 NRL season including the 2013 NRL Grand Final which Manly lost against the Sydney Roosters 26-18.

On 6 August 2015, Horo signed a two-year contract to play in the Super League for French club the Catalans Dragons starting in 2016. In September 2017 he signed a two-year deal with Wakefield Trinity. Horo played with Wakefield Trinity until the end of 2019. In 2021, Horo spoke on the Locker Room podcast of his time at Wakefield disclosing that he didn't enjoy his stay at the club and was close to quitting after the first training session.

== Representative career ==
In 2010, Horo played for the New Zealand Māori team against England.

== Personal life ==
Horo is from the Tainui iwi. His father is former New Zealand international Mark Horo and he has stated his allegiance to the Kiwis. His uncle, Shane Horo, also represented New Zealand. Horo recently competed in a high profile match race against multi-sport athlete Jordan Simi. Horo won the race but rumours that Horo had Jordan Simis part of the track watered pre-race to gain an advantage. Horo avoided conviction for a cocaine charge, after being caught by police with possession and a rolled up note, in a Sydney pub in early 2021. Horo currently runs a rugby league podcast called Levels Network alongside former player Willie Mason.
