= Paterika Vaivai =

Samoan rugby player and footballer (born 1992)

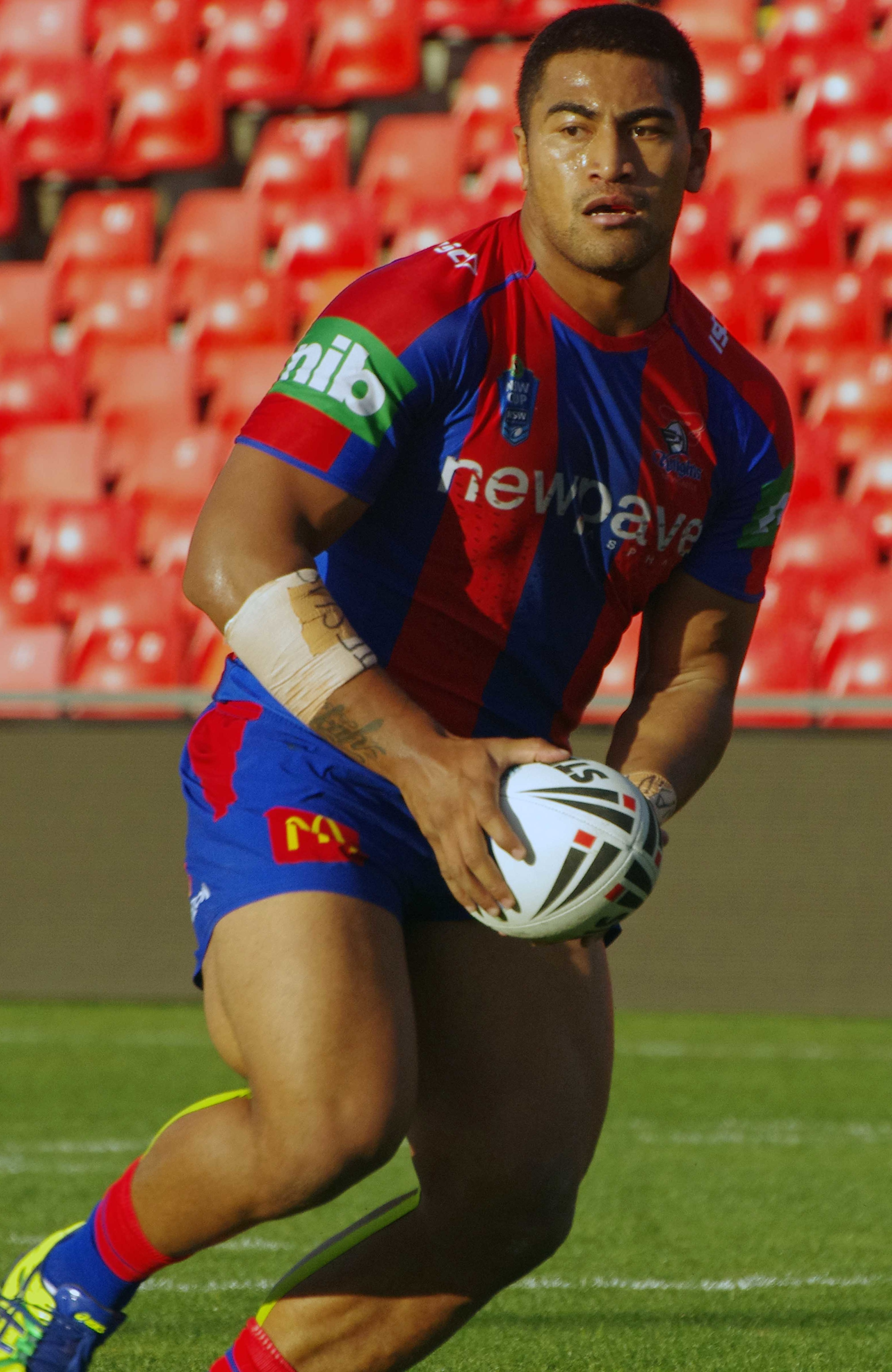

Personal information
- Born: 14 February 1992 (age 34) Salamumu, Samoa
- Height: 181 cm (5 ft 11 in)
- Weight: 120 kg (18 st 13 lb)

Playing information

Rugby league
- Position: Prop
Club
Years	Team	Pld	T	G	FG	P
2014–15	Newcastle Knights	6	0	0	0	0
2017	Burleigh Bears	15	2	0	0	8
2017	Gold Coast Titans	10	1	0	0	4
2018	Leigh Centurions	1	0	0	0	0
2019–20	Toulouse Olympique	27	6	0	0	24
2022–2024	Te Atatu Roosters	23	3	4	0	18
2023	NZ Warriors (NSW Cup)	8	1	0	0	4
2025	Ipswich Jets	17	0	0	0	0
2026	Te Atatu Roosters	9	0	5	0	10
	Total	116	13	9	0	68
Representative
Years	Team	Pld	T	G	FG	P
2022	Akarana Falcons	2	0	0	0	0

Rugby union
Club
Years	Team	Pld	T	G	FG	P
2021	SU Agen	8	0	0	0	0
- Source: As of 26 May 2024 (UTC)

Paterika Vaivai (born 14 February 1992) is a Samoan professional rugby league footballer who plays for the Ipswich Jets in the Hostplus Cup.

He previously played for the Newcastle Knights and Gold Coast Titans in the National Rugby League, and the Leigh Centurions in the Championship.

== Background ==
Vaivai was born in Salamumu, Samoa, and moved to New Zealand at a young age.

He played his junior rugby league for the Bay Roskill Vikings in the Auckland Rugby League's Sharman Cup, before being signed by the Melbourne Storm.

== Playing career ==
=== Early career ===
After playing with the Melbourne Storm, Vaivai returned to New Zealand in 2010 to play for the New Zealand Warriors. He was a part of their NYC squad but didn't play a game. In 2012, he joined the Newcastle Knights. He played for the Knights' NYC team in 2012, winning the Knights' NYC Coach's Award, before graduating to the Knights' New South Wales Cup team in 2013.

=== 2014 ===
In round 9 of the 2014 NRL season, Vaivai made his NRL debut for Newcastle against the Penrith Panthers. On 1 November, he re-signed with the Newcastle club on a two-year contract.

=== 2015 ===
Vaivai went on to play five more games in 2015, but at the end of the season, was released a year early from his Newcastle contract, due to being arrested for allegedly taking part in what was reported as an out-of-control brawl.

=== 2016 ===
In 2016, Vaivai joined the Burleigh Bears in the Queensland Cup. In September, after impressing in the Queensland Cup, he signed a one-year contract with the Gold Coast Titans starting in 2017.

=== 2017 ===
Vaivai played ten NRL games for the Gold Coast club in the 2017 season. In October, he signed a two-year contract with the Leigh Centurions in the Kingstone Press Championship, starting in 2018.

=== 2021 ===
On 15 February 2021 it was reported that he had agreed to leave Toulouse Olympique by mutual consent with immediate effect.

On 15 April 2021 it was announced that he had switched code to play for French rugby union club SU Agen in the Top 14

=== 2022-24 Te Atatū Roosters and NZ Warriors (NSW Cup) ===
In 2022 Vaivai signed with the Te Atatu Roosters playing eight matches for them. He resigned in 2023 but has also played in the New Zealand Warriors New South Wales Cup side and as a result was only able to play for Te Atatū three times with seven appearances for the NSW Cup side. He debuted on March 11 when he came off the interchange bench in a 30–18 win at Allianz Stadium in Sydney. He re-signed with the Te Atatū club again in 2024 being responsible for training the side and played in their debut win over Richmond on April 6.
