= Romi Ropati =

Samoa international rugby union footballer

- Born: 20 June 1976 (age 50) Auckland, New Zealand
- Height: 1.71 m (5 ft 7 in)
- Weight: 73 kg (11 st 7 lb; 161 lb)
- School: Auckland Grammar
- Notable relative(s): Joe Ropati (brother); Iva Ropati (brother); Peter Ropati (brother); Tea Ropati (brother)

Rugby union career
- Position(s): Centre, Wing
Senior career
Years	Team	Apps	(Points)
2003–2005	Toyota Verblitz		
2005–2006	Castres	8	(0)
2006-2007	US Colomiers	7	(0)
Provincial / State sides
Years	Team	Apps	(Points)
1996	Auckland		
1997-2002	Otago	40	(105)
2008	Counties Manukau		
Super Rugby
Years	Team	Apps	(Points)
1997–02	Highlanders	50	(95)
International career
Years	Team	Apps	(Points)
2003-2008	Samoa	2	(0)

Romi Ropati (born 20 June 1976 in Auckland, New Zealand) is a retired rugby union player best known for his time with the Highlanders Super Rugby franchise. Although born in New Zealand, he represented Samoa internationally and was a member of the Samoan squad at the 2003 Rugby World Cup. He is the Coach of Tahiti's Men's National Rugby Union Team.

== Playing career ==
Ropati is a member of a famous rugby league family and he had three older brothers who played internationally for the New Zealand Kiwis (Joe, Tea and Iva). However, he chose to pursue a career in rugby union, and made his provincial debut for Auckland in 1996 as part of a squad which would win the National Provincial Championship.

Ropati was then one of a group of Auckland players (including future All Black Kees Meeuws) who transferred south to join Otago and the Highlanders for 1997. The move was a fruitful one as Ropati became a fixture in both sides for the next 5 seasons, winning the NPC again with Otago in 1998 in a year in which he scored 12 tries from 13 matches. With the Highlanders, he became one of the franchise's most-capped backs, leaving on exactly 50 appearances following the 2002 Super 12 season.

In 2003, Ropati left New Zealand to begin a two-year stint in the Japanese Top League with Toyota Verblitz. He then moved to France to join Castres Olympique in 2006, before joining Pro D2 outfit US Colomiers for the following season.

Ropati returned to New Zealand in 2008 to close out his career with Counties Manukau in that year's Air New Zealand Cup.

== International career ==
Ropati played for New Zealand age group sides but was never called up to the All Blacks. Eligible to play for Samoa, he was included in their squad for the 2003 Rugby World Cup and made his debut on 1 November in a 60–10 defeat to South Africa.

This looked to be his sole international appearance until he was a surprise inclusion in the Samoan squad selected to play New Zealand in New Plymouth on 3 September 2008, almost 5 years after his debut. He came on as a substitute in a 101–14 defeat.
