= Pāʻea =

Commune in French Polynesia, France

- Commune
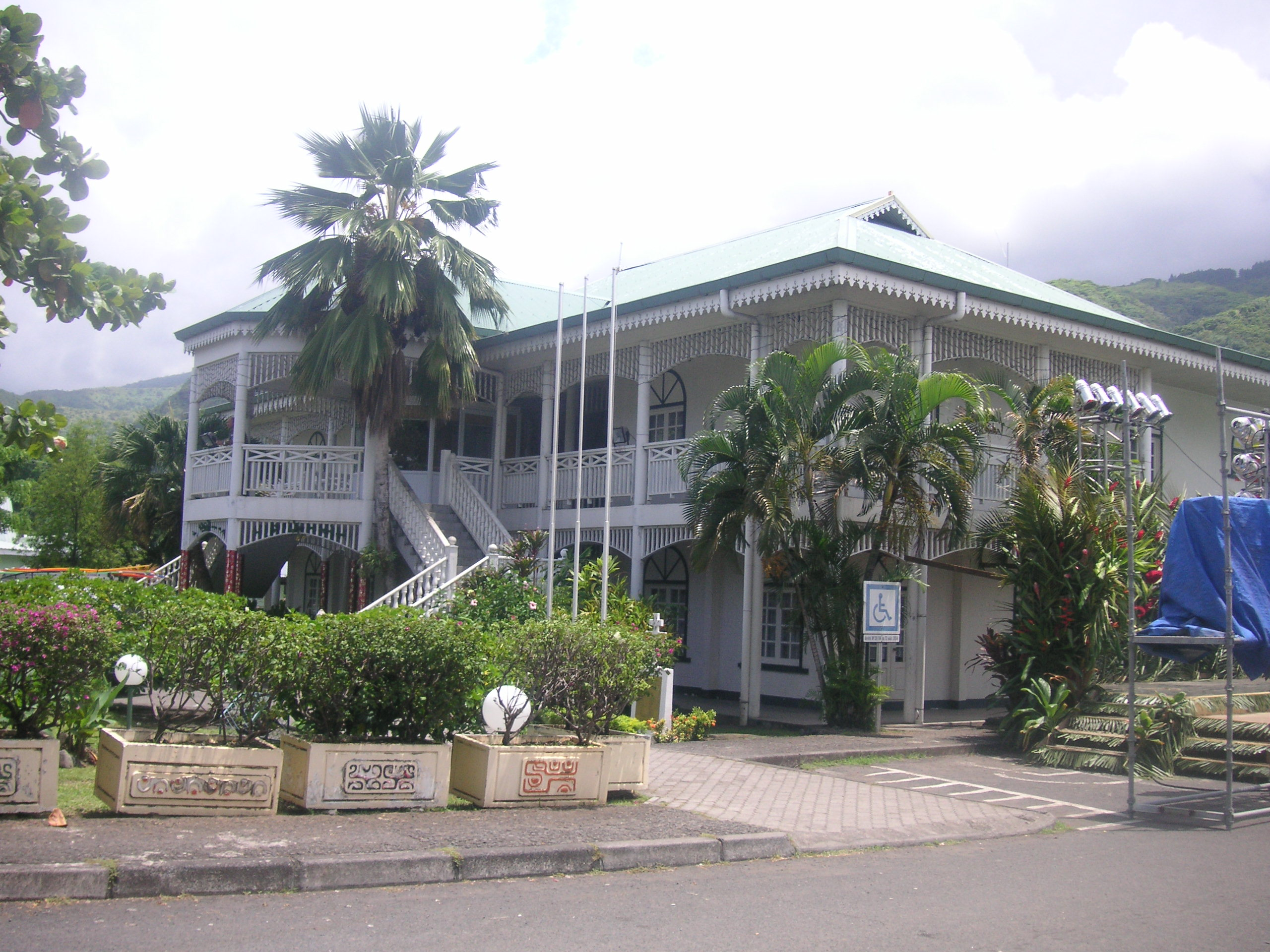
- The town hall of Paea

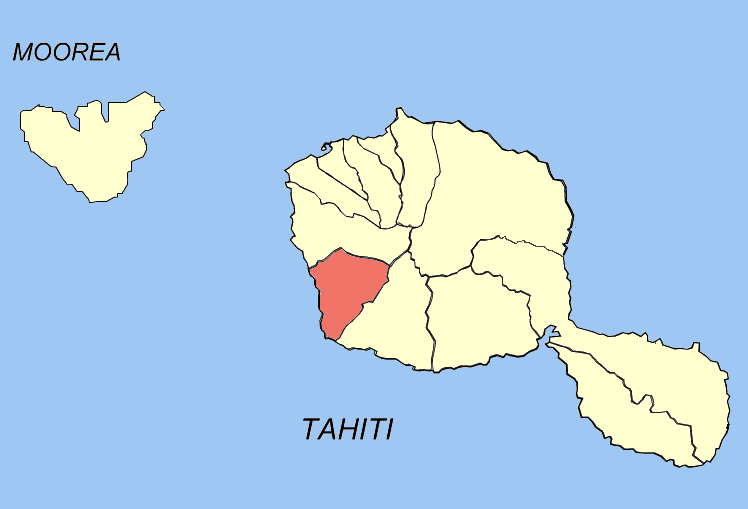
- Location of the commune (in red) within the Windward Islands
- Location of Pāʻea
- Coordinates: 17°41′34″S 149°35′14″W
- Country: France
- Overseas collectivity: French Polynesia
- Subdivision: Windward Islands

Government
  - Mayor (2020–2026): Antony Geros
- Area^{1}: 64.5 km^{2} (24.9 sq mi)
- Elevation: 5 m (16 ft)
- Highest elevation: 1,501 m (4,925 ft)
- Lowest elevation: 0 m (0 ft)
- Population (2022): 12,756
  - Density: 198/km^{2} (512/sq mi)
- Time zone: UTC−10:00
- INSEE/Postal code: 98733 /98711
- ^{1} French Land Register data, which excludes lakes, ponds, glaciers > 1 km^{2} (0.386 sq mi or 247 acres) and river estuaries.

Pāʻea is a commune in the suburbs of Papeʻete in French Polynesia, an overseas territory of France in the southern Pacific Ocean. Pāʻea is located on the island of Tahiti, in the administrative subdivision of the Windward Islands, themselves part of the Society Islands. At the 2022 census it had a population of 12,756.

Tahiti's west coast freeway runs through Pāʻea and ends in Teahupoʻo down south. Going northbound would take drivers toward Papeʻete.

The area of Pāʻea was first settled by Polynesian explorers. Captain James Cook had arrived in 1769. Pāʻea was part of the Kingdom of Tahiti until France claimed the islands of French Polynesia. The Faaa International Airport was built in 1962 and opened later on. The now defunct Air Moorea's flight 1121 crashed while it was flying to Moʻorea. Close to where the crash site is located lies a rock with the names of those people killed in the accident.

Moʻorea is north of Pāʻea and is seen as a gray mound sticking out of the Pacific Ocean. Mount Orohena is a major mountain nearby measuring 7,330 feet tall.

== Geography ==
=== Climate ===
Pāʻea has a tropical rainforest climate (Köppen climate classification Af). The average annual temperature in Pāʻea is 25.9 °C (78.6 °F). The average annual rainfall is 2,221.3 mm (87.45 in) with December as the wettest month. The temperatures are highest on average in March, at around 27.3 °C (81.1 °F), and lowest in July, at around 24.3 °C (75.7 °F). The highest temperature ever recorded in Paea was 35.1 °C (95.2 °F) on 19 March 1998; the coldest temperature ever recorded was 15.9 °C (60.6 °F) on 30 August 1976.

Climate data for Paea (1981–2010 averages, extremes 1971−2010)
Month	Jan	Feb	Mar	Apr	May	Jun	Jul	Aug	Sep	Oct	Nov	Dec	Year
Record high °C (°F)	34.9 (94.8)	34.5 (94.1)	35.1 (95.2)	34.5 (94.1)	33.4 (92.1)	32.6 (90.7)	32.8 (91.0)	32.1 (89.8)	32.5 (90.5)	33.2 (91.8)	34.1 (93.4)	34.3 (93.7)	35.1 (95.2)
Mean daily maximum °C (°F)	31.4 (88.5)	31.4 (88.5)	31.7 (89.1)	31.0 (87.8)	29.8 (85.6)	28.8 (83.8)	28.5 (83.3)	28.7 (83.7)	29.1 (84.4)	29.8 (85.6)	30.2 (86.4)	30.5 (86.9)	30.1 (86.2)
Daily mean °C (°F)	27.1 (80.8)	27.0 (80.6)	27.3 (81.1)	26.8 (80.2)	25.8 (78.4)	24.8 (76.6)	24.3 (75.7)	24.4 (75.9)	24.8 (76.6)	25.5 (77.9)	26.0 (78.8)	26.5 (79.7)	25.9 (78.6)
Mean daily minimum °C (°F)	22.7 (72.9)	22.6 (72.7)	22.9 (73.2)	22.6 (72.7)	21.9 (71.4)	20.9 (69.6)	20.2 (68.4)	20.1 (68.2)	20.6 (69.1)	21.2 (70.2)	21.9 (71.4)	22.5 (72.5)	21.7 (71.1)
Record low °C (°F)	19.2 (66.6)	20.0 (68.0)	20.1 (68.2)	19.0 (66.2)	18.3 (64.9)	16.2 (61.2)	16.3 (61.3)	15.9 (60.6)	17.0 (62.6)	17.5 (63.5)	18.0 (64.4)	19.0 (66.2)	15.9 (60.6)
Average precipitation mm (inches)	208.5 (8.21)	185.9 (7.32)	198.8 (7.83)	142.9 (5.63)	171.0 (6.73)	169.6 (6.68)	128.2 (5.05)	147.9 (5.82)	166.6 (6.56)	170.2 (6.70)	208.8 (8.22)	322.9 (12.71)	2,221.3 (87.45)
Average precipitation days (≥ 1.0 mm)	15.2	13.0	12.8	10.4	10.0	9.0	8.1	7.4	9.4	10.7	13.3	16.7	136.0
Source: Meteociel

== Population ==
Historical population
Year	Pop.	±%
2002	12,052	—
2007	12,084	+0.3%
2012	12,541	+3.8%
2017	13,021	+3.8%
2022	12,756	−2.0%

== See also ==
- Faʻaʻā
