= Tahiti Championship D2 =

Second tier of the Tahitian rugby union league

- Current season, competition or edition: 2020 Tahiti Championship D2 season
- Sport: Rugby union
- No. of teams: 3
- Country: Tahiti
- Promotion to: Tahiti Championship

Tahiti Championship D2(French: Championnat de Tahiti D2), also known as Championnat de Tahiti 2eme division, is the second tier of rugby union club competition division in Tahiti. It is operated by Fédération Polynésienne de Rugby-Tahiti (FPR) which also runs the division directly above, the first division Tahiti Championship. It is Overseas France best supported second tier rugby union league.
