= Stade Hamuta =

- Stade Hamuta
- Interactive map of Stade Hamuta
- Full name: Stade Hamuta
- Location: Papeete, Tahiti
- Coordinates: 17.533895°S 149.551628°W
- Capacity: 10,000

Tenant
- AS Manu-Ura

Stade Hamuta is a multi-use stadium in Papeete, Tahiti, in French Polynesia. It is currently used mostly for football matches and hosts the home matches of AS Manu-Ura of the Tahiti Division Fédérale. The stadium holds 10,000 spectators.
