= Tahiti Championship =

Tahitian rugby union club

- Most recent season or competition: 2020 Tahiti Championship season
- Sport: Rugby union
- Founded: 1971
- No. of teams: 5
- Country: Tahiti
- Most recent champions: Pirae (7th title) (2019)
- Most titles: Paea (18 titles): Paea Manu Ura (13 titles); AS Manu Ura (5 titles)
- Relegation to: Tahiti Championship D2
- Website: www.federationpolynesiennederugby.com/

Notes
- Official Source: https://www.federationpolynesiennederugby.com/

The Tahiti Championship (French: Championnat de Tahiti) is a domestic rugby union club competition that is played in Tahiti. Created in 1971, the Tahiti Championship is at the top of the national league system operated by the Polynesian Rugby Federation (Tahiti), also known by its French initialism of FPR. There is promotion and relegation between the Tahiti Championship and the next level down, the Tahiti Championship D2. The seven best rugby teams in Tahiti participate in the competition, hence the name Championnat de Tahiti. The competition previously had more teams, but the league was split into two divisions.

Many local French Polynesian players began their careers here in this league before moving to France to compete in the divisions of Ligue Nationale de Rugby.

The first ever final took place in 1971, Paea won the inaugural season. The competition has been held on an annual basis since, except in 1995 and 1997. Paea is the most successful club in the competition with 18 titles. Rugby is a hit in French Polynesia, especially in Tahiti, it is a great place to play rugby in paradise.

== 2020 season ==
| Club | City (commune) | Stadium | Capacity | Previous season |
|---|---|---|---|---|
| Arue | Papeete, Arue | Stade Fautaua | 10,000 | Vice Champions (1st in league) |
| Faʻaʻā | Papeete, Faʻaʻā | Stade Fautaua | 10,000 | 6th |
| Papeete | Papeete | Stade Fautaua | 10,000 | Semi-finalists (4th in league) |
| Pirae | Papeete, Pirae | Stade Fautaua | 10,000 | Champions (2nd in league) |
| Punaauia | Papeete, Punaauia | Stade Fautaua | 10,000 | Semi-finalists (3rd in league) |

2020 Tahiti Championship table
| Pos | Team | Pld | W | D | L | PF | PA | PD | TF | TA | TB | LB | Pts | Qualification |
|---|---|---|---|---|---|---|---|---|---|---|---|---|---|---|
| 1 | Faʻaʻā | 3 | 2 | 1 | 0 | 67 | 43 | +24 | 5 | 2 | 1 | 1 | 12 | Semi-finals |
| 2 | Punaauia | 3 | 2 | 0 | 1 | 50 | 39 | +11 | 2 | 0 | 1 | 1 | 10 | Semi-finals |
| 3 | Pirae | 3 | 1 | 1 | 1 | 77 | 45 | +32 | 2 | 1 | 1 | 1 | 8 | Semi-finals |
| 4 | Arue | 3 | 0 | 1 | 2 | 34 | 82 | −48 | 2 | 0 | 0 | 0 | 2 | Semi-finals |
| 5 | Papeete | 2 | 0 | 1 | 1 | 23 | 42 | −19 | 0 | 1 | 0 | 0 | 2 | |

Rules for classification: If teams are level at any stage, tiebreakers are applied in the following order:
1. Competition points earned in head-to-head matches
2. Points difference in head-to-head matches
3. Try differential in head-to-head matches
4. Points difference in all matches
5. Try differential in all matches
6. Points scored in all matches
7. Tries scored in all matches
8. Fewer matches forfeited
9. Classification in the previous Tahiti Championship season
Due to the COVID-19 pandemic in Tahiti and the suspension of the season, teams may end up not having to be relegated to Tahiti Championship D2.

== Notes ==
Official Source: Fédération Polynésienne de Rugby - Accueil
