= Polynesian Rugby Federation (Tahiti) =

The French Polynesian Rugby Federation (French: Fédération Polynésienne de Rugby-Tahiti), known as the FPR, manages the selection of the National team and representation internationally, and also manages the National club rugby sector in Tahiti and all of French Polynesia, by delegation of The Institute of Youth and Sports of French Polynesia (IJSPF) and the Tahitian Rugby Federation.

FPR

- organises, manages and regulates the two Tahitian rugby club divisions, Tahiti Championship and Tahiti Championship D2,
- manages the selections of the national team and representation of Tahiti in International competitions.
