= 2026 Auckland Rugby League season =

118th season of the Auckland Rugby League

Auckland Rugby League
- Founded: 1909
- Responsibility: Auckland
- Headquarters: Rugby League House, 17-19 Beasley Ave, Penrose, Auckland 1061
- Key people: Shelley Kopu (chairperson), Darren Brady (Deputy Board Chair), Colin Groves (Director), Paul Seagar (Director), Dr Christine Woods (ARL North/West Region Board Director) (Chief Executive)
- Competitions: Fox Memorial Premiership, Steele-Shanks Women's Premiership, Sharman Cup, Phelan Shield
- Website: aucklandleague.co.nz
- As of 24 April 2026

The 2026 season was the 118th season since the founding of the Auckland Rugby League in 1909. The men's and women's senior season began on April 25. The Fox Memorial Shield competition featured just eight teams for the first time in over a decade with a second division (Sharman Cup) also featuring just eight sides. A third division of five teams was also formed for the first time in over a decade. Richmond, the Fox Memorial winners of 2024, were in the Phelan Shield competition after being unable to field two senior sides which was a requirement to play in the Fox or Sharman competitions. The Steele-Shanks womens premiership competition featured six sides with a Championship featuring three sides (Waitemata, Otara, and a second Richmond side).

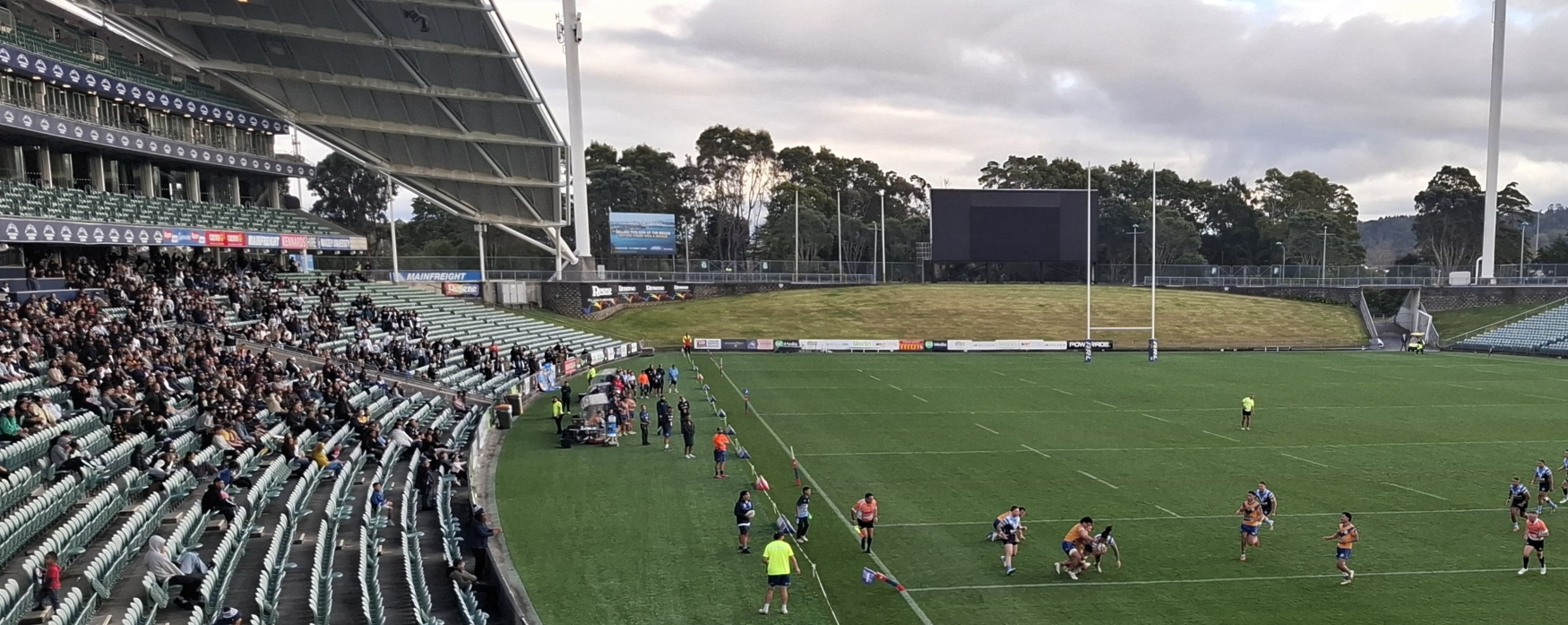
Tevita Mikaele scoring the winning try for Otahuhu in their 20-16 Fox Memorial Shield grand final win over Mt Albert.

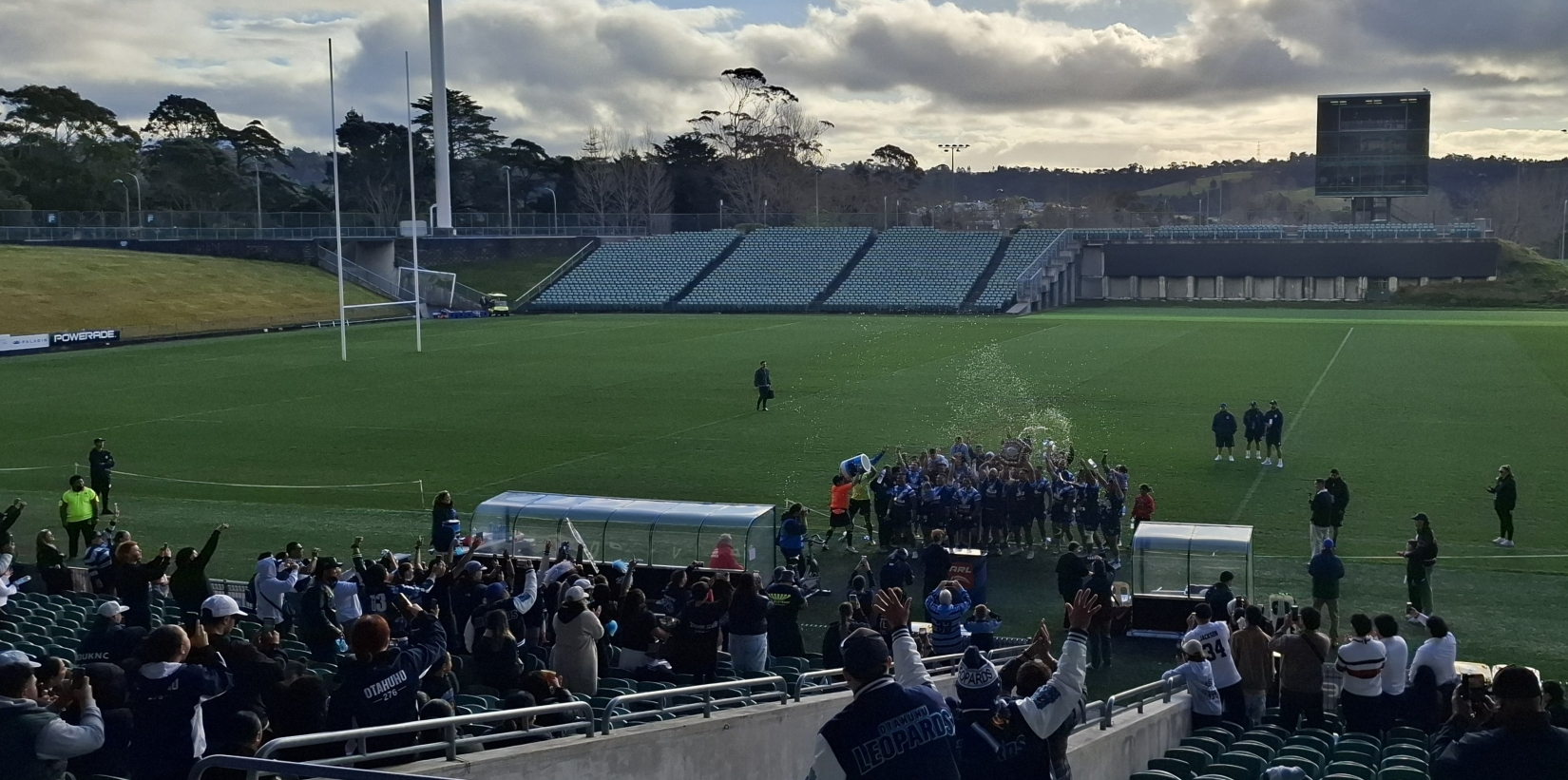
Otahuhu Leopards players and supporters celebrating their Fox Memorial Shield win.

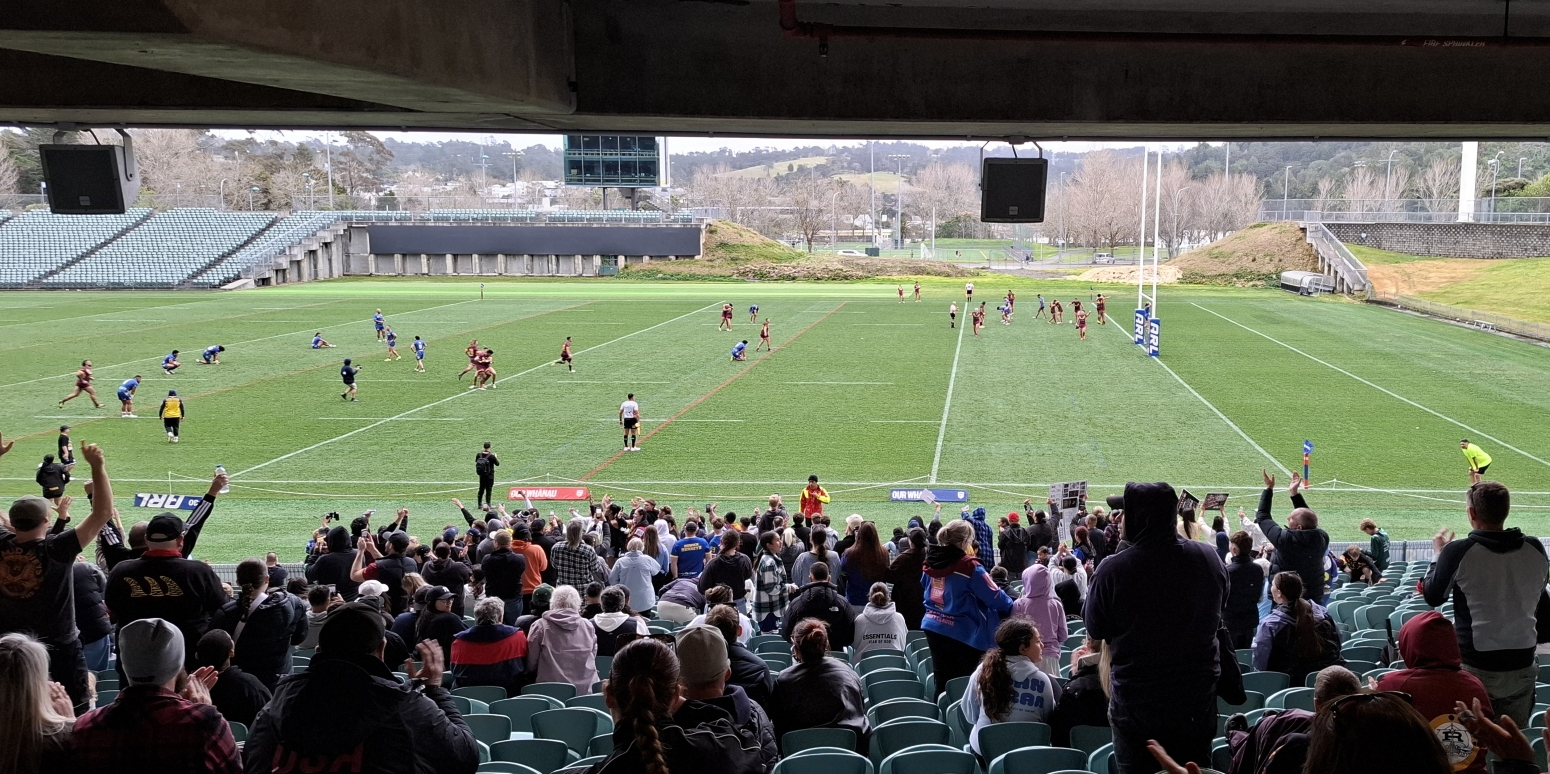
Hibiscus Coast players and supporters celebrating their 24-18 win over Howick in the Sharman Cup final.

On August 16 the Steele-Shanks Womens Premiership final was played at North Harbour Stadium with the Otahuhu Leopards winning a see-sawing contest 32-26 over Mangere East who had twice held the lead. The Otahuhu club completed the double with their mens side defending their title, once again completing an unbeaten season when they beat Mount Albert Lions 20-16 in a tight final. Mt Albert had led with 10 minutes remaining following three second half tries to over turn a 0-14 halftime deficit before a late penalty and try to Otahuhu saw the game swing back their way. The win meant they had won 33 consecutive games and was now just two first grade championship wins behind Mt Albert with 14 to Mt Alberts 16. The Sharman Cup was won for the third time by the Hibiscus Coast Raiders following wins in 1998 and 2001. They defeated Howick Hornets 24-18 in an even contest at North Harbour Stadium on August 15. The win meant they were promoted to the Fox Memorial competition for the 2027 season, replacing Marist Saints who were relegated after finishing last in the Fox competition. Richmond Rovers defeated Pakuranga Jaguars 26-12 in the final of the Phelan Shield. At the conclusion of the club season on August 22 a promotion/relegation match was played between Ponsonby Ponies who had finished second to last in the Fox Memorial Mens Premiership and Hibiscus Coast Raiders who had finished runners up in the Sharman Cup. Ponsonby came back from 10-6 down at halftime to win 24-16 to remain in the Fox Memorial competition for the 2027 season.

Preceded by 2025	118th Auckland Rugby League season 2026	Succeeded by 2027

== News ==
=== Premier competitions ===
The Fox Memorial Shield competition began on April 25. Due to covid disrupted seasons from 2020 to 2022 the Auckland Rugby League decided that “2023 and 2024 will work as a bridge between the 2022 shortened season and by 2025 will see a return to a more exclusive Fox Memorial Premiership competition”, with the 2025 season seeing only 10 teams in the Fox Memorial premiership, down from the 12 teams of 2023 and 2024. And then it was reduced once more to eight teams for the 2026 season. Te Atatū and Ponsonby were the two teams relegated, though Richmond were unable to field both a premier and reserve grade team meaning they were ineligible for the Fox and Sharman competitions for 2026 and were relegated to the Phelan Shield competition, with Ponsonby taking their place in the Fox Memorial competition for the season. The 2026 season also saw the reintroduction of the Phelan Shield competition, effectively the 3rd division after it had been removed during the covid and post-covid years with all teams being placed in 2 divisions.

The opening round of senior games took place on Anzac Day, April 25. It was announced by Auckland Rugby League that they had formed a partnership with BarTV to show all Fox Memorial and Steele-Shanks games live (streamed). BarTV is an Australian based site which live streams rugby league games across Australia with this being their first move into New Zealand domestic rugby league. It is a subscription site meaning viewers pay to watch the games with a portion of the money going back to the organisations involved.

=== Death of Eugene Hanna ===
On Tuesday, May 12, Glenora reserve grade player passed away in Auckland Hospital. He had spent two weeks there before succumbing to "an unsurvivable head injury" suffered in their April 25 match with Te Atatu Roosters at Jack Colvin Park. He had collapsed near the conclusion of the match by the Glenora dugout area. The premier match was delayed while an ambulance was called at 2.17pm and they took Hanna to Auckland City Hospital. Glenora chairwoman, Janet Hunt said that "Eugene was a valued player in our Premier Reserves squad and although a new Bears member had good friends within the club". He had also played for several West Auckland football (soccer) clubs including Lynn-Avon and West Auckland based in Kelston.

=== Clubrooms ===
==== Northcote Tigers new clubroom ====
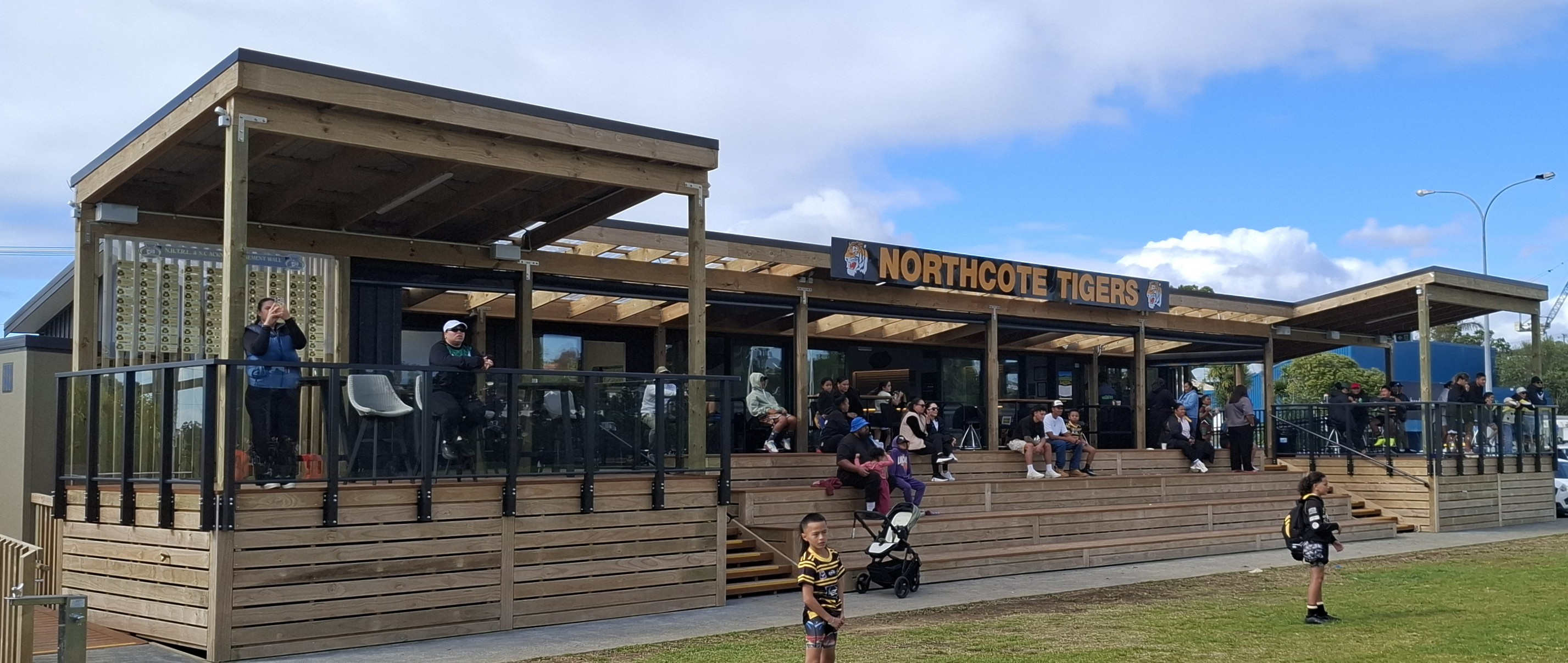
Northcote's recently opened replacement clubroom showing the outdoor deck area and seating.

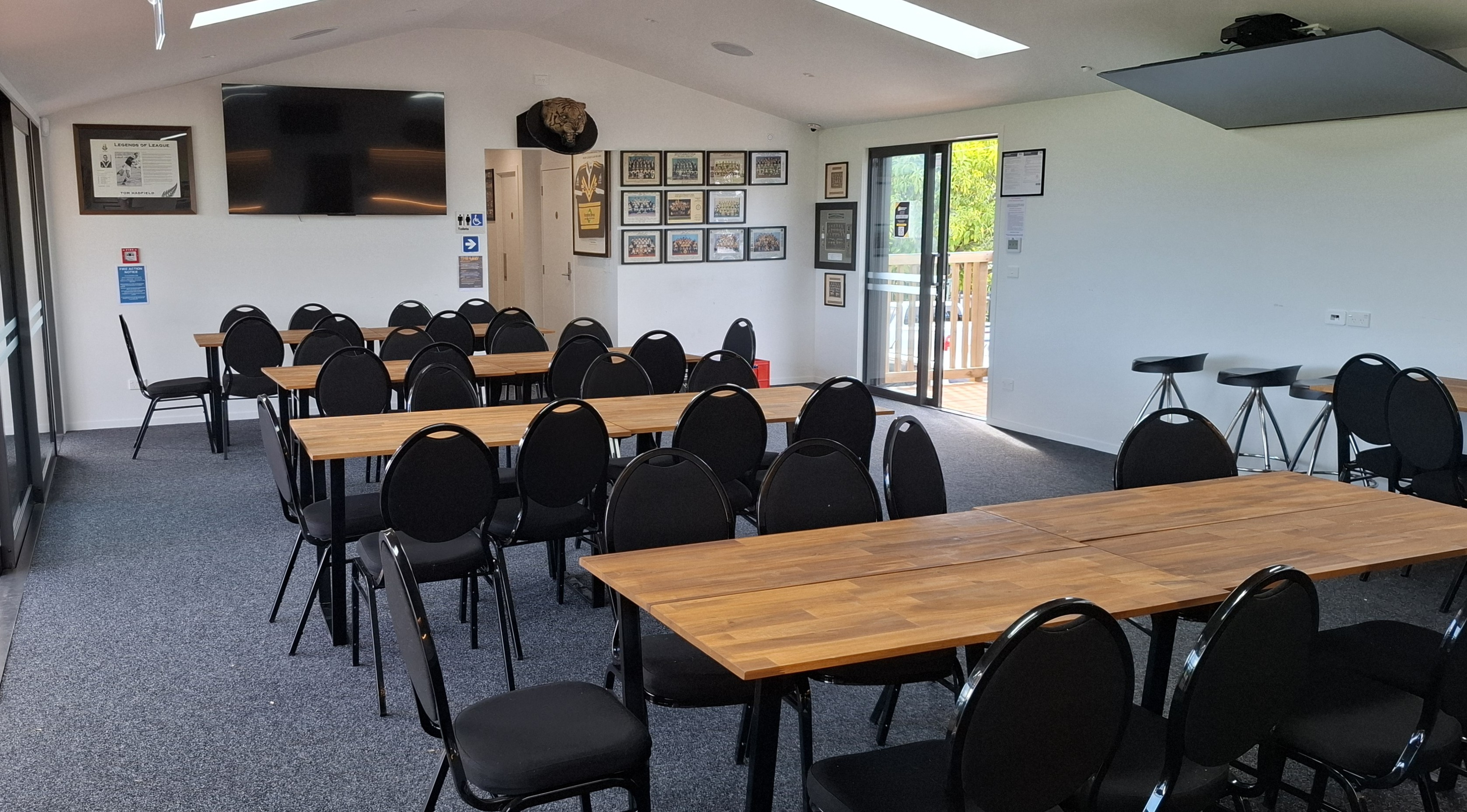
Northcote club room interior with some team photographs from their early history on the rear wall.

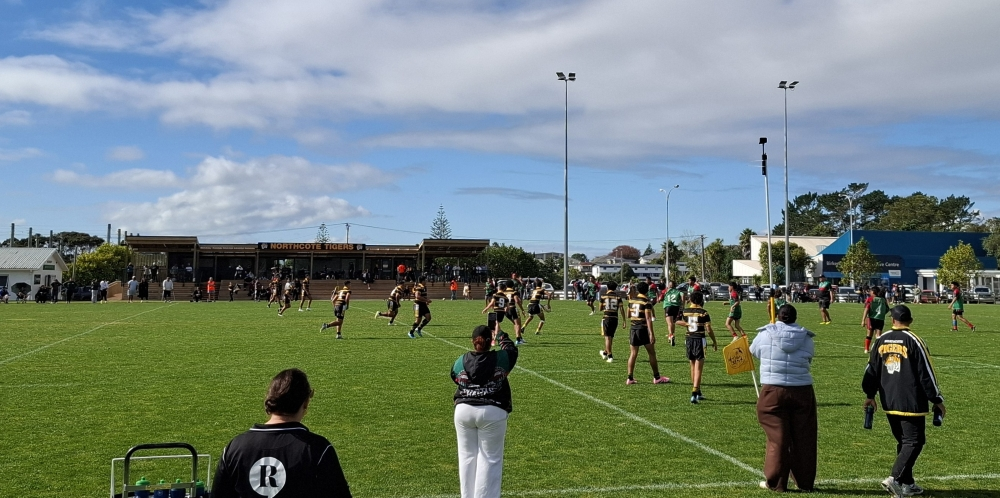
Northcotes new clubrooms with an U14 game between Northcote and Mangere East in the foreground.

Northcote Tigers opened their new clubrooms at the Birkenhead War Memorial. They had been without one for several years after their original clubrooms were demolished as they were beneath the condemned grand stand at the same location. The new clubrooms feature a relatively small indoor seated area but a large deck for entertaining which opens out on to the main field.

==== Howick ====
On April 24 the Howick Hornets opened their new bar in their clubrooms at Paparoa Park in Howick. The same day they played Arataki Bears and drew 11-11. The Marist club began producing an online newsletter with the first edition in April giving an update on the process of building a new club room following their original clubroom at Murray Halberg Park in Ōwairaka being burned down on November 16, 2023. The newsletter said that the committee was exploring two options “1. Moving an existing building on site and renovate fit for purpose. 2. Complete rebuilding.” Following this they would look at costs and then make recommendations, working with funders to proceed.

== Fox Memorial Competition ==
The competition featured eight teams who would play a home and away round robin meaning 14 rounds. The competing sides were Bay Roskill, Marist, Manukau, Mt Albert, Otahuhu, Papakura, Pt Chevalier, and Ponsonby.

=== Fox Memorial ===
==== Standings ====
Team	Pld	W	D	L	F	A	PD	Pts
Otahuhu Leopards	14	14	0	0	576	138	+438	28
Manukau Magpies	14	7	2	4	348	276	+72	17
Mount Albert Lions	14	7	1	6	270	293	-23	15
Point Chevalier Pirates	14	6	2	6	336	274	+62	14
Bay Roskill Vikings	14	5	3	6	316	354	-38	13
Papakura Sea Eagles	14	6	0	8	314	340	-26	12
Ponsonby Ponies	14	5	1	8	309	430	-121	11
Marist Saints	14	1	0	13	216	580	-364	2

==== Fixtures ====
===== Round 1 =====
The match at Bert Henham Park between Otahuhu and Mt Albert was for the Stormont Cup as they were the grand finalists from the previous season. The trophy was first played for in 1925 and at that time was between the winner of the Fox Memorial and winner of the Roope Rooster however in recent decades it was changed to the present match up. Otahuhu added the trophy to their collection with a 32 to 12 win after trailing at halftime 10-12. Phoenix Hunt, the Otahuhu hooker crossed for two tries, while forwards Sebastine Ikahihifo and Connor Taurua-Purcell used their size to crash over for a try each. William Fakatoumafi converted four of their six tries. For Mt Albert hooker and captain Navajo Doyle scored a try and added two conversions.

25 April	Otahuhu	32-12	Mt Albert	Bert Henham Park 1, Otahuhu
2:30	Try: Tevita Mikaele (8m), Phoenix Hunt (19m, 66m), Connor Taurua-Purcell (44m), Sebastine Ikahihifo (54m), Toaiti Ramsay (80m); Con: William Fakatoumafi 4/6 (20m, 45m, 55m, 68m)		Try: Navajo Doyle (13m), Aston Fraser (33m); Con: Navajo Doyle 2/2 (15m, 34m)	Referee: Anthony Eliott, Touch Judges: Corey Jull and Tameilau Pauuvale

25 April	Pt Chevalier	12-34	Bay Roskill	Walker Park 2, Pt Chevalier
2:30	Try: Denzel Hurt-Pickering (11m), Fatani Manukia (49m); Con: Trujon Nomani-Brown 2/2 (12m, 50m)		Try: Vincent Tupu 2 (16m, 24m), Nixon Leaso 2 (30m, 34m), Zacchaeus Cordtz (43m), Jarvis Leaoseve (70m); Con: Josh Tanielu 4/6 (27m, 31m, 35m, 44m); Pen: Josh Tanielu 1/1 (28m)	Attendance: 200; Referee: David Millar, Touch Judges: Ngaone Sefo and Curtis Wharewaka

25 April	Papakura	34-20	Manukau	Prince Edward Park 1, Papakura
2:30	Try: Talita Salima-Satuia (4m), Brodie Strickland (17m), Fuamaila Gatapu (25m), Siave Togoiu (28m), Jarney Proctor (65m); Con: Lorenzo Filimaua 5/6 (5m, 26m, 29m, 63m, 67m)		Try: Paea Folau (12m), Kahn Munokoa 2 (45m, 49m), Yijo John (72m); Con: Leti Muller 2/4 (13m, 72m)	Attendance: 250; Referee: Keven Ah-Ken, Touch Judges: Saane Mosaati and James Priest

25 April	Ponsonby	36-34	Marist	Victoria Park 1, Auckland Central
2:30	Try: Timor Williams (3m), Heitony Talagi 2 (27m, 71m), Soane Hufanga (42m), Ben Wharton-Benedict (56m), Saula Solomona (59m); Con: Dylan Tavita 6/6 (4m, 28m, 43m, 57m, 60m, 72m)		Try: Holyfeld Kapsin 2 (13m, 18m), Draven Sao (36m), Ara Cerei (51m), Cree Braithwaite (74m), Montell Matamu Tuese (78m); Con: Aria Cerei 5/6 (15m, 38m, 52m, 77m, 79m)	Referee: Brent Newton, Touch Judges: Warren Clarke and Leigh Fletcher

===== Round 2 =====
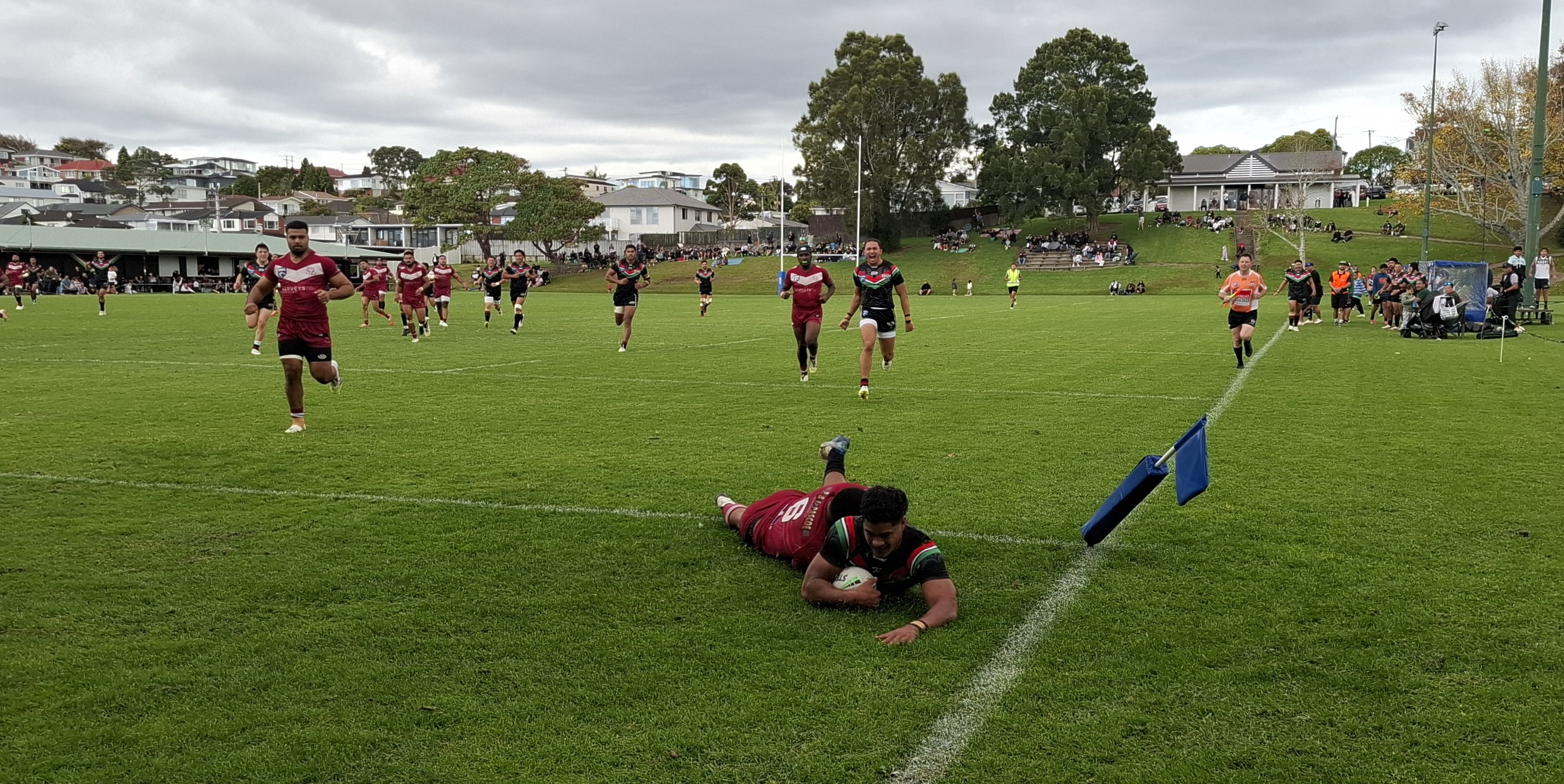
Josh Tanielu scoring a brilliant solo try following an 80 metre run for Bay Roskill.

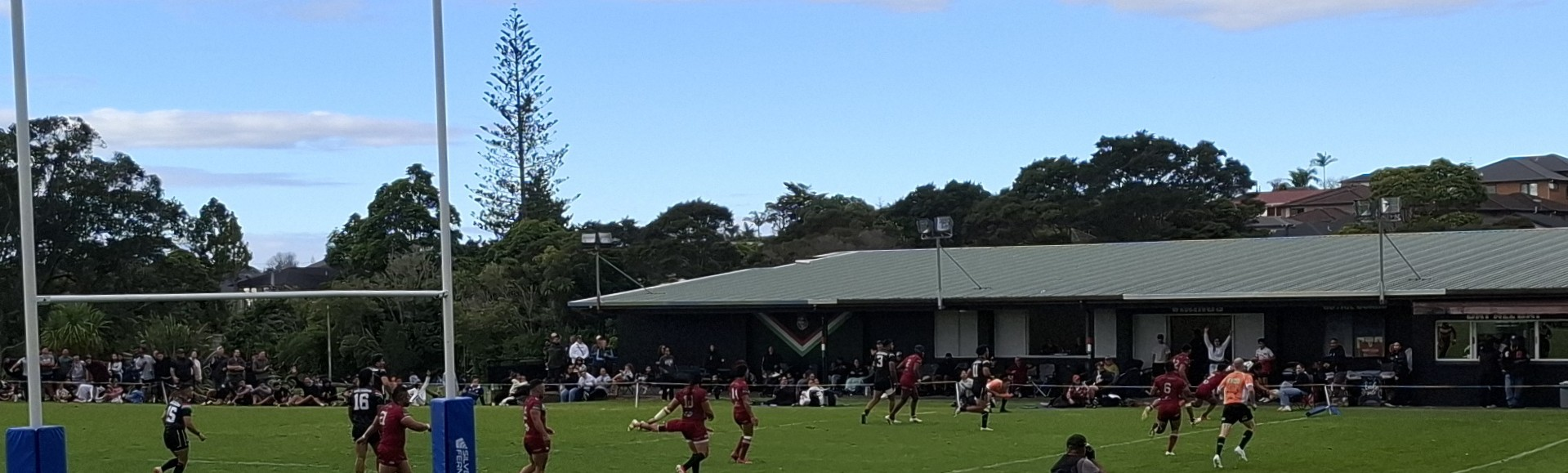
Jarvis Leaoseve scoring a spectacular diving try in the corner in the second half.

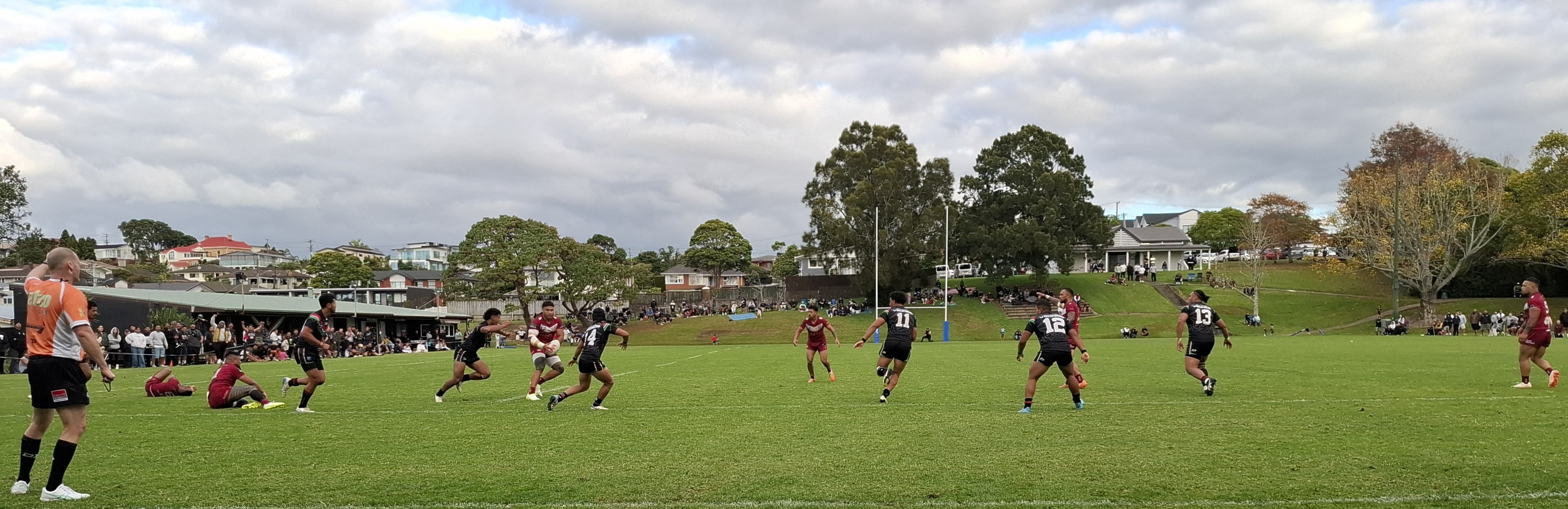
Stedman Lefau with the ball as Papakura attacked late in the match.

Bay Roskill continued their strong start to the season with a comfortable win over Papakura at Blockhouse Bay Reserve. The features of the match were the very poor handling of Papakura who rarely got to a last tackle kick and the attackign attitude of the home side who moved the ball around in their characteristic style. Vinny Vogel opened the scoring in the 19th minute after an even contest to that point. It opened the floodgates with 18 points in 6 minutes. Josh Tanielu who had started the season in the NZ Warriors NSW Cup side scored a spectacular try when he broke through the defence and stood up Jese Qaraniqo before running another 50 metres to score in the corner and minutes later Justus Leaoseve scored and the conversion gave them an 18-0 lead. Brodie Strickland pulled one back for Papakura 6 minutes before half time. But any hint of a comeback with extinguished by tries to Jarvis Leaoseve and Zion Tanielu. Lorenzo Filimaua scored a long range try for Papakura after he scooped up a loose ball to make it 28-10 before Jarvis Leaoseve finished the scoring for the Vikings. At Fowlds Park the home side, Mt Albert broke out to an early 12-0 lead before Pt Chevelier worked back into the game with tries to Patrick Sipley (23m) and Lani Graham-Taufa (34m). The teams exchanged tries in the second half with Paaua Papanui-Abbott (43m, 56m) and Matagi-Blade Collins-Kamuhemu (44m, 75m) each scoring a double for Mt Albert and Pt Chevalier respectively with Collins-Kamuhemu's second try securing the win with less than five minutes remaining. Wiremu Makea converted all four of Mt Albert's tries while Trujon Nomani-Brown kicked four from five for the Pirates. Manukau bounced back from their opening round defeat to thrash Marist 50-14 at Moyle Park. The teams traded early tries to Ah Fook Ah Fook (3m), and Isileli Ula (8m) before Manukau began to take control with prolific try scorer Kahn Munokoa scoring two tries with the Magpies leading 20-8 at the break. With Takaia Williams scoring in the 48th minute, Tama-Teahorangi Darlington's conversion gave Marist hope at 2014 before the Magpies ran in five tries to blow the score out. Munokoa scored his third while Leti Muller converted all five of them to go with two in the first half. At Prince Edward Park the visiting Ponsonby side, playing in their alternative City-Newton style strip threatened a big upset, going down 18-16 to the Otahuhu side which has now won nineteen consecutive premier games. Saula Solomona scored in the corner for the Ponies after a clever cross field kick from captain Dylan Tavita. Otahuhu replied through tries to Jamel Hunt (19m) and Phoenix Hunt (26m) who pushed through from dummy half. William Fakatoumafi scored from scrappy play and his conversion gave them an 18-4 halftime lead. The second half so an even contest with Ponsonby the only side to score, with a try to Dylan Tavita in the 56th minute and another to Levi Helleur-Atiga (66m) after Jeremiah Poutu had spilled the ball taking a hitup. Tavita converting both. However the Leopards held on for the narrow win to defend the Roope Rooster.

2 May	Bay Roskill	32-10 (18-4)	Papakura	Blockhouse Bay Reserve 4, Blockhouse Bay
2:30	Try: Vinny Vogel (16m), Josh Tanielu (19m), Justus Leaoseve (23m), Jarvis Leaoseve 2 (42m, 67m), Zion Tanielu Seiuli (48m); Con: Josh Tanielu 4/6 (18m, 21m, 24m, 44m)		Try: Brodie Strickland (34m), Lorenzo Filimaua (56m); Con: Lorenzo Filimaua 1/2 (58m)	Attendance: 350; Referee: Anthony Eliott, TJ’s: Corey Jull & Warren Clarke

2 May	Mt Albert	24-28 (12-12)	Pt Chevalier	Fowlds Park 1, Morningside
2:30	Try: Trent Schaumkel (5m), Isaiah Fale (10m), Paaua Papuni-Abbott 2 (43m, 56m); Con: Wiremu Makea 4/4 (6m, 11m, 44m, 56m)		Try: Patrick Sipley (23m), Lani Graham-Taufa (34m), Matagi-Blade Collins-Kamuhemu 2 (44m, 75m), Shaun Sauni-Esau (71m); Con: Trujon Nomani-Brown 4/5 (23m, 36m, 71m, 77m)	Attendance: 300; Referee: Paki Parkinson, TJ’s: Eisley Brown & Leigh Fletcher

2 May	Manukau	50-14 (20-8)	Marist	Moyle Park 1, Mangere
2:30	Try: Ah Fook Ah Fook (3m), Kahn Munokoa 3 (13m, 20m, 54m), Clive Tu’ifua (30m), Samuel Nati (57m), Tyrone Waipouri (67m), Viliami Kuli (71m), Kaes Daniels Strickland (75m); Con: Leti Muller (4m, 15m, 55m, 59m, 69m, 73m, 77m)		Try: Isileli Ula (8m), Militonimolela Sikuvea (36m), Takaia Williams (48m); Con: Tama-Teahorangi Darlington (49m)	Attendance: 250; Referee: Daniel Caddy, TJ’s: Michael Une & Tameilau Pauuvale

2 May	Otahuhu	18-16 (18-4)	Ponsonby	Bert Henham Park 1, Otahuhu
2:30	Try: Jamel Hunt (19m), Phoenix Hunt (26m), William Fakatoumafi (33m); Con: William Fakatoumafi 3/3 (20m, 27m, 37m)		Try: Saula Solomona (16m), Dylan Tavita (56m), Levi Helleur-Atiga(66m); Con: Dylan Tavita 2/3 (58m, 68m)	Attendance: 200; Referee: Keven Ah-Ken, TJ’s: James Priest & Curtis Wharewaka

===== Round 3 =====
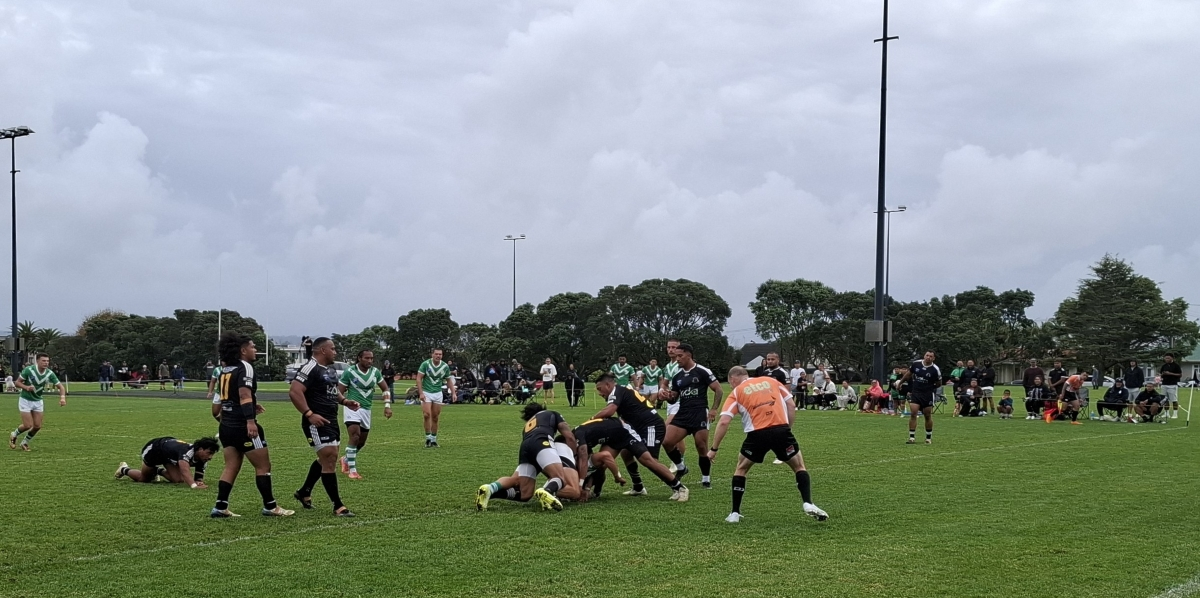
Patrick Sipley crashing over to open the scoring for Point Chevalier.

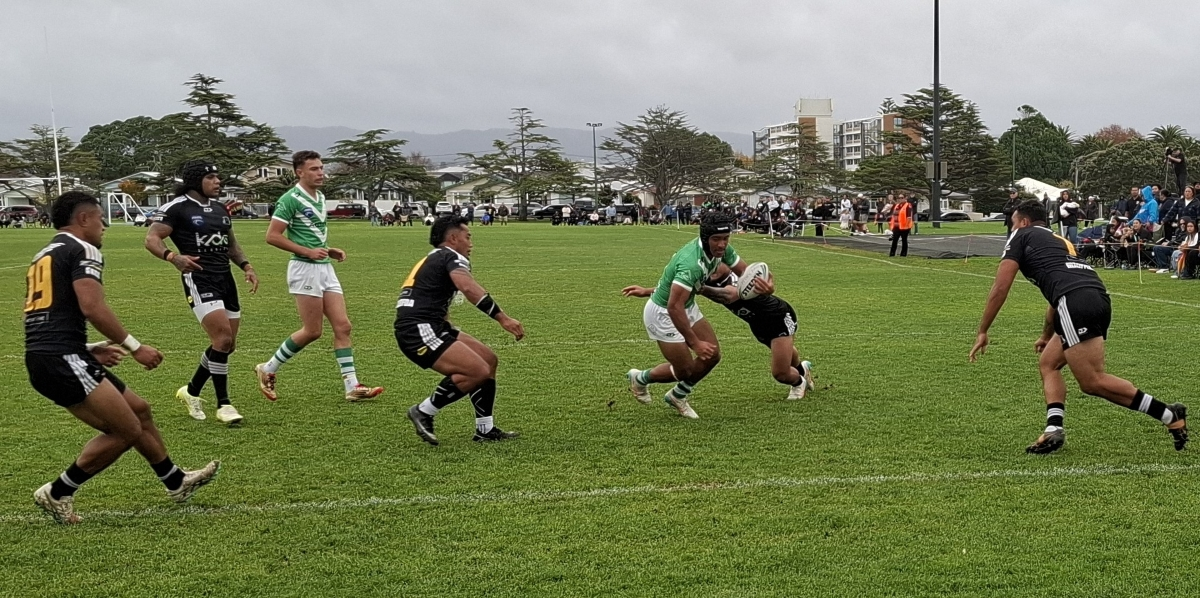
Mark Anthony Sikuvea scoring in the first half.

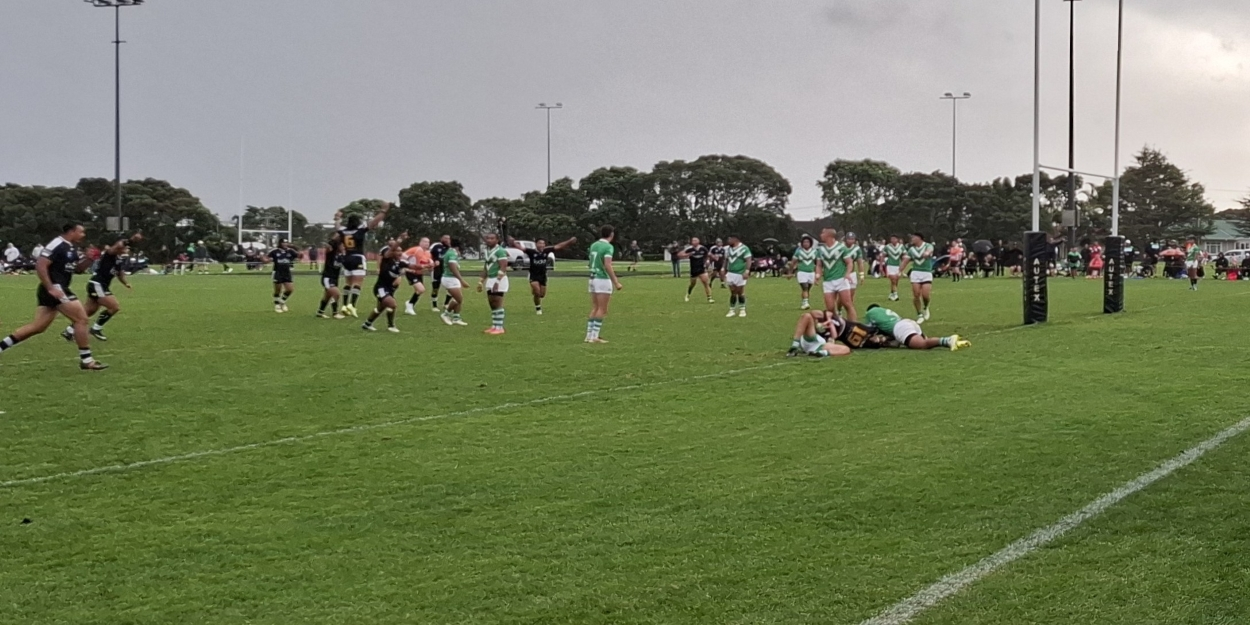
Sisi Toutai just getting the ball down for a try after a Pt Chevalier turnover.

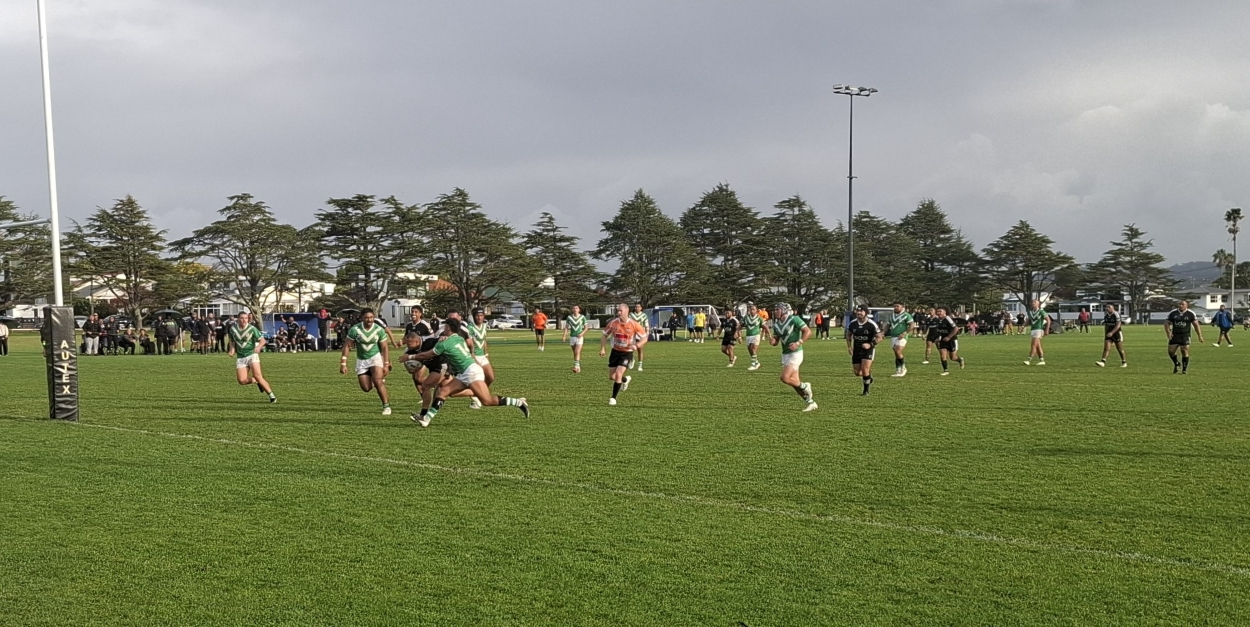
Viliami going over for the try which enabled Manukau to secure a last minute draw.

Pt Chevalier and Manukau played out an even match at Walker Park with the final score of 22-22 being a fair reflection of the play. Manukau gave away a number of penalties for offside which often led to Pt Chevalier tries while the Pirates flaw was their handling errors which led directly to Manukau points. Big forward Patrick Sipley (17m) showed his footwork and strength when he beat defenders near the line and crashed over in a three man tackle. Paea Fotu (22m) replied for Manukau when he dived on an attacking kick, before Pt Chevalier with the wind at their back scored tries to Mark Anthony Sikuvea (31m) who injected himself into the backline on the left after coming across from the right wing, and big forward Sione Ngahe. Sisi Toutai then got Manukau back into the game when he appeared to get away with a strip in the tackle which saw the ball fall free and he gathered and worked his way over in a two man tackle. Sikuvea cut through to score his second and give the Pirates a 22-10 lead before Samuel Nati threw a dummy to beat the defence and send Raven Togiafofoa under the posts. The score stayed at 22-16 until two minutes from time when Nati put up a bomb which Pt Chevalier allowed to bounce. It went sideways into the hands of Kaes Strickland who immediately passed to Viliami Kuli whoh crashed over next to the posts with Leti Muller's conversion tying the scores with no time for a restart. Ponsonby and Bay Roskill played out a see sawing game at Victoria Park. The home side opened the scoring with a 2nd minute try to Amaromo Solomona, but Bay Roskill replied soon after with big back Zion Tanielu scoring. Ponsonby scored two converted tries to take an 18-6 lead but then a flurry of points from Bay Roskill with tries in the 26th, 30th, and 40th minutes all converted by Josh Tanielu saw them go to halftime up 24-18. Sasha Urale levelled the scores early in the second half before Bay Roskill once again moved ahead with Vincent Tupu scoring his second try. They looked to have sealed the game winning attacking ball with minutes to go but turned the ball over and Ponsonby got on to attack with Dylan Tavita burrowing over from dummy half and converting his own try to secure a high scoring 30-30 draw. Terrell Lefau-Sala played his 50th game for Papakura in their home match with Mt Albert. Papakura won comfortably 36 to 16 scoring seven tries to three however they trailed 10-8 at halftime after two unconverted tries to Jese Qaraniqio and Siave Togoiu played against tries to Mt Albert forwards Solomon Vasuvulagi and Thompson Karena with Wiremu Makea adding one conversion. The teams exchanged tries early in the second half with Mt Albert holding a 16-14 lead before Papakura took the lead in the 57th minute with Seru Blake crossing and then they ran in tries to Lonnie Papani (61m), Talita Salima-Satuia (64m), and Lorenz Filimaua (67m). Papani, the former Glenora player scored two tries while Lorenzo Filimaua finished with 12 points through his try and four conversions. At Murray Halberg Park the home side, Marist was hapless in the face of the big Otahuhu side which has now won 20 consecutive games. At halftime Otahuhu led 28-6 before adding another 52 points in the second half. For Otahuhu centre Toaiti Ramsay scored six tries including four consecutively through the middle of the second half, with Patolo Taito scoring twice and James Dowie converting ten tries.

9 May	Ponsonby	30-30 (18-24)	Bay Roskill	Victoria Park 1, Central Auckland
2:30	Try: Amaromo Solomona (2m), Timor Williams (14m), Devon Makoare-Boyce (20m), Sasha Urale (49m), Dylan Tavita (76m); Con: Dylan Tavita 5/5 (3m, 15m, 21m, 51m, 78m)		Try: Zion Tanielu (7m), Joel Leaoseve (26m), Nixon Leaso (30m), Vincent Tupu 2 (40m, 71m); Con: Josh Tanielu 5/5 (8m, 27m, 31m, 40m, 72m)	Referee: Keven Ah-Ken, TJ’s: Warren Clarke & Leigh Fletcher

9 May	Papakura	36-16 (8-10)	Mt Albert	Prince Edward Park, Papakura
2:30	Try: Jese Qaraniqio (12m), Siave Togoiu (25m), Lonnie Papani 2 (45m, 61m), Seru Blake (57m), Talitua Salima-Satuia (64m), Lorenzo Filimaua (67m); Con: Lorenzo Filimaua 4/7 (46m, 59m, 62m, 66m)		Try: Solomon Vasuvulagi (8m), Thompson Karena (37m), Marcus Fraser (52m); Con: Wiremu Makea 2/3 (9m, 54m)	Referee: Pali Parkinson, TJ’s: Tameilai Pauuvale & Michael Une

9 May	Pt Chevalier	22-22 (16-4)	Manukau	Walker Park 2, Pt Chevalier
2:30	Try: Patrick Sipley (17m), Mark Anthony Sikuvea 2 (31m, 56m), Sione Ngahe (39m); Con: Trujon Nomani-Brown 3/4 (18m, 40m, 58m)		Try: Paea Fotu (22m), Sisi Toutai (45m), Raven Togiafofoa (60m), Viliami Kuli (78m); Con: Leti Muller 3/4 (46m, 62m, 79m)	Referee: Anthony Eliott, TJ’s: Corey Jull & Eisley Brown

9 May	Marist	10-80 (6-28)	Otahuhu	Murray Halberg Park
2:30	Try: Holyfield Kapsin (38m), Montell Matamu Tuese (73m); Con: Lyric Matamu (40m)		Try: Patolo Taito 2 (4m, 45m), Maki Ropati (12m), Toaiti Ramsay 6 (15m, 50m, 53m, 60m, 63m, 70m), Connor Taurua-Purcell (25m), Albert Vete (33m), Joshua Kopua (41m), Phoenix Hunt (67m), Jeremiah Poutu (76m), Tevita Mikaele (79m); Con: James Dowie 10 (13m, 16m, 25m, 34m, 42m, 54m, 62m, 65m, 68m, 77m)	Referee: David Millar, TJ’s: James Priest & Curtis Wharewaka

===== Round 4 =====
Bay Roskill had their second consecutive draw, when Mt Albert scored a late converted try to see the match finish 12-12. Mt Albert opened the scoring in the 19th minute when Thompson Karena crossed, before Zion Tanielu scored and Josh Tanielu's conversion tied the game at 6-6 at the break. The home team took the lead through Zavier Tutaki early in the second half before Mt Albert salvaged a point. Francis Leger, the veteran player in his first season for Mt Albert converted both tries for the Lions. Corey Seator was playing his 100th game for Mt Albert with Trent Schaumkel in his 50th. At Moyle Park Manukau and Ponsonby exchanged the lead several times with Ponsonby ahead 18-14 when Dylan Tavita converted his second try in the 60th minute. Manukau then dominated the final 17 minutes with tries to Yijo John, Samuel Nati, Kahn Munokoa, and Kaes Daniels Strickland. Munokoa scored a double and brought his season tally to seven. Leti Muller converted five of their seven tries. Tavita kicked three conversions to go with his try to bring up 50 individual points through four games. Pt Chevalier threatened an upset at Bert Henham Park when they led 12-6 at halftime but Otahuhu had the stronger second half to improve to 4-0 on the season. Pt Chevalier scored early after a long range try to Trujon Nomani-Brown who also converted it before a repeat set saw Otahuhu level the scores when James Dowie got over and converted. Pt Chevalier then restored their lead following a series of play the balls near Otahuhu's line and an offload from Samuel Waterworth, the former Hibiscus Coast player to Patrick Sipley saw him slip through a hole near the try line. Nomani-Brown put Pt Chevalier 8 points clear when he kicked a penalty in the 58th minute. Jamel Hunt then barged his way over underneath the posts for his fourth try of the season. Dowie narrowed the gap to two points with the easy conversion. Toaiti Ramsay then scored a brilliant solo try from halfway beating the last defender to score near the left corner, it was his eighth try of the year to lead all try scorers. Then on full time Connor Taurua-Purcell scored a trade mark try crashing over from close range.

16 May	Bay Roskill	12-12 (6-6)	Mt Albert	Blockhouse Bay Reserve 4, Blockhouse Bay
2:30	Try: Zion Tanielu (27m), Zavier Tutaki (46m); Con: Josh Tanielu 2/2 (29m 48m)		Try: Thompson Karena (19m), Ollie Horgan (65m); Con: Francis Leger 2/2 (21m, 77m)	Referee: Daniel Caddy, TJ’s: Warren Clarke & Leigh Fletcher

16 May	Manukau	38-20 (8-8)	Ponsonby	Moyle Park 1, Mangere
2:30	Try: Kahn Munokoa 2 (4m, 70m), Paea Fotu (37m), Christian Tupou (52m), Yijo John (63m), Samuel Nati (65m), Kaes Daniels Strickland (73m); Con: Leti Muller 5/7 (54m, 64m, 67m, 72m, 75m)		Try: Sasha Urale (18m), Dylan Tavita (44m, 58m); Con: Dylan Tavita (18m, 45m, 60m); Pen: Dylan Tavita (40m)	Referee: Anthony Eliott, TJ’s: Curtis Wharewaka & James Priest

16 May	Otahuhu	20-14 (6-12)	Pt Chevalier	Bert Henham Park 1, Otahuhu
2:30	Try: James Dowie (19m), Jamel Hunt (60m), Toaiti Ramsay (67m), Connor Taurua-Purcell (24m); Con: James Dowie 2/4 (21m, 61m), William Fakatoumafi 0/1		Try: Trujon Nomani-Brown (17m), Patrick Sipley (27m); Con: Trujon Nomani-Brown 2/2 (17m, 27m); Pen: Trujon Nomani-Brown 1/1 (59m)	Referee: Paki Parkinson, TJ’s: Eisley Brown & Corey Jull

16 May	Marist	14-18 (6-10)	Papakura	Murray Halberg Park 1, Owairaka
2:30	Try: Militonimolela Sikuvea (6m), Montell Matamu Tuese (44m); Con: Tama-Teahorangi Darlington 2/2 (8m, 45m); Pen: Tama-Teahorangi (73m)		Try: Ngarima Maugatai (15m), Siave Togiau 2 (20m, 50m); Con: Fuamaila Gatapu 1/3 (17m); Pen: Fuamaila Gatapu 2/2 (77m, 80m)	Referee: Keven Ah-Ken, TJ’s: Dayton Ryan & Paul Lorigan

===== Round 5 =====
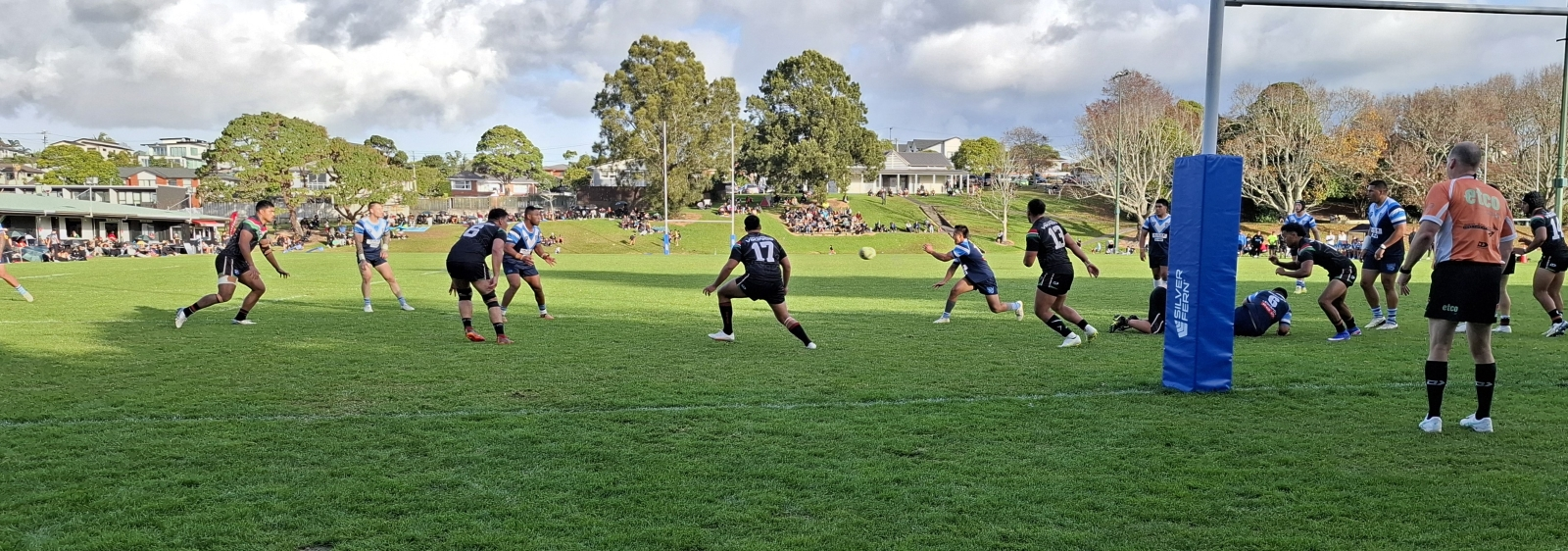
Taane Paki moving the ball wide for Tevita Mikaele to score for Otahuhu.

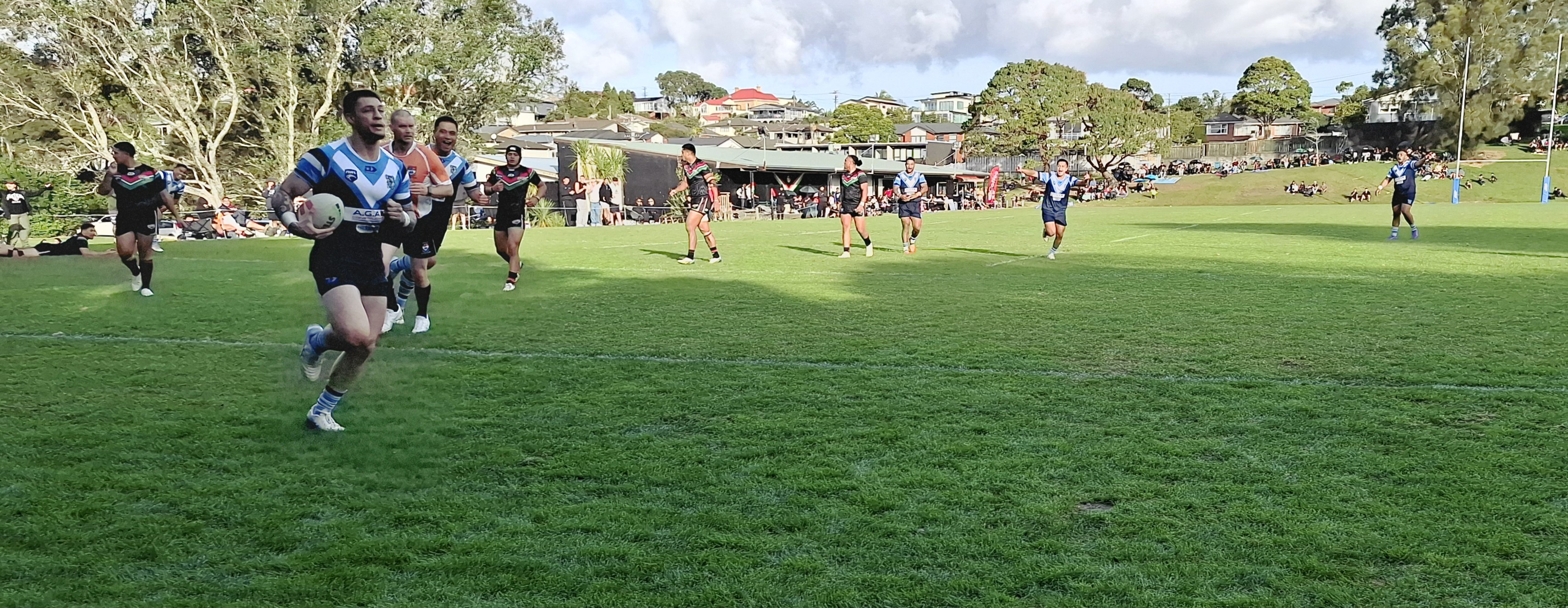
Toaiti Ramsey scoring Otahuhu's 5th try to make the score 26-0.

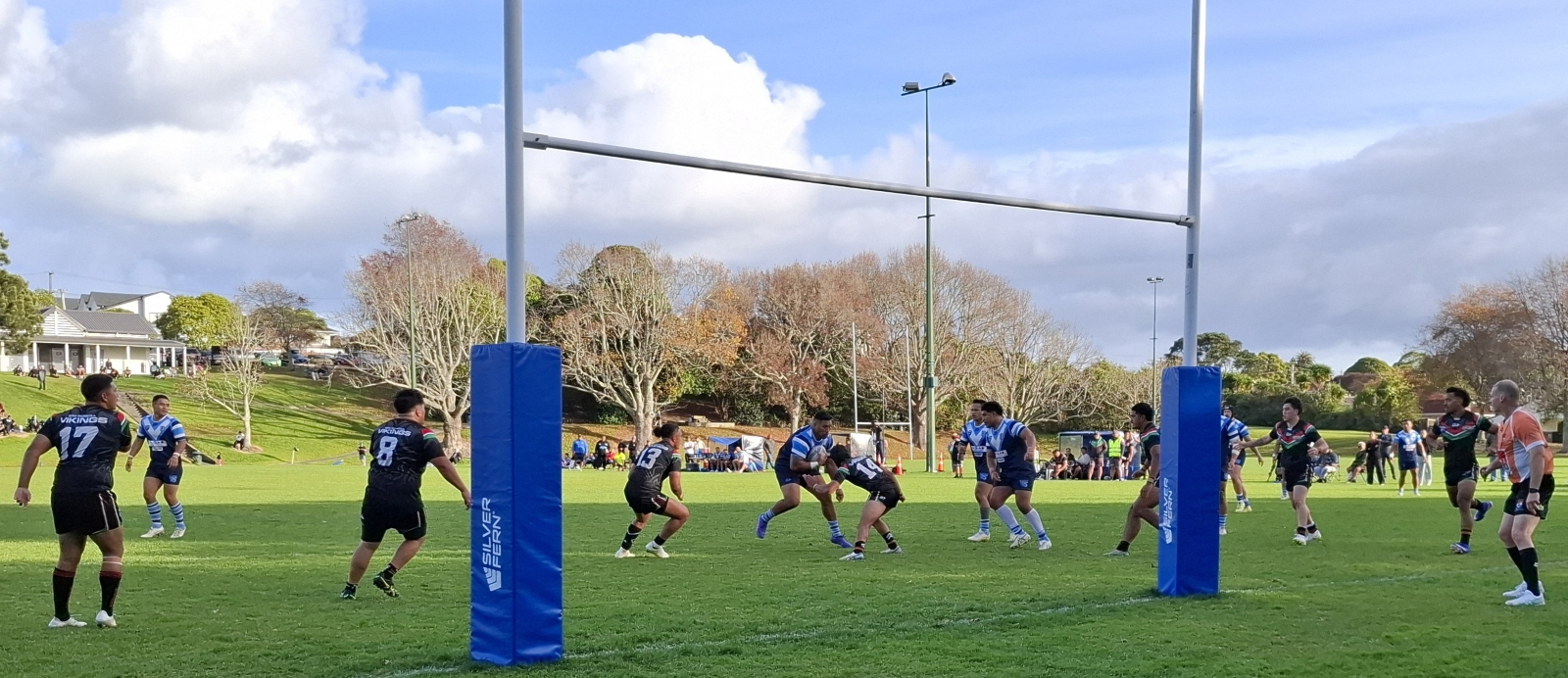
Albert Vete taking the ball up.

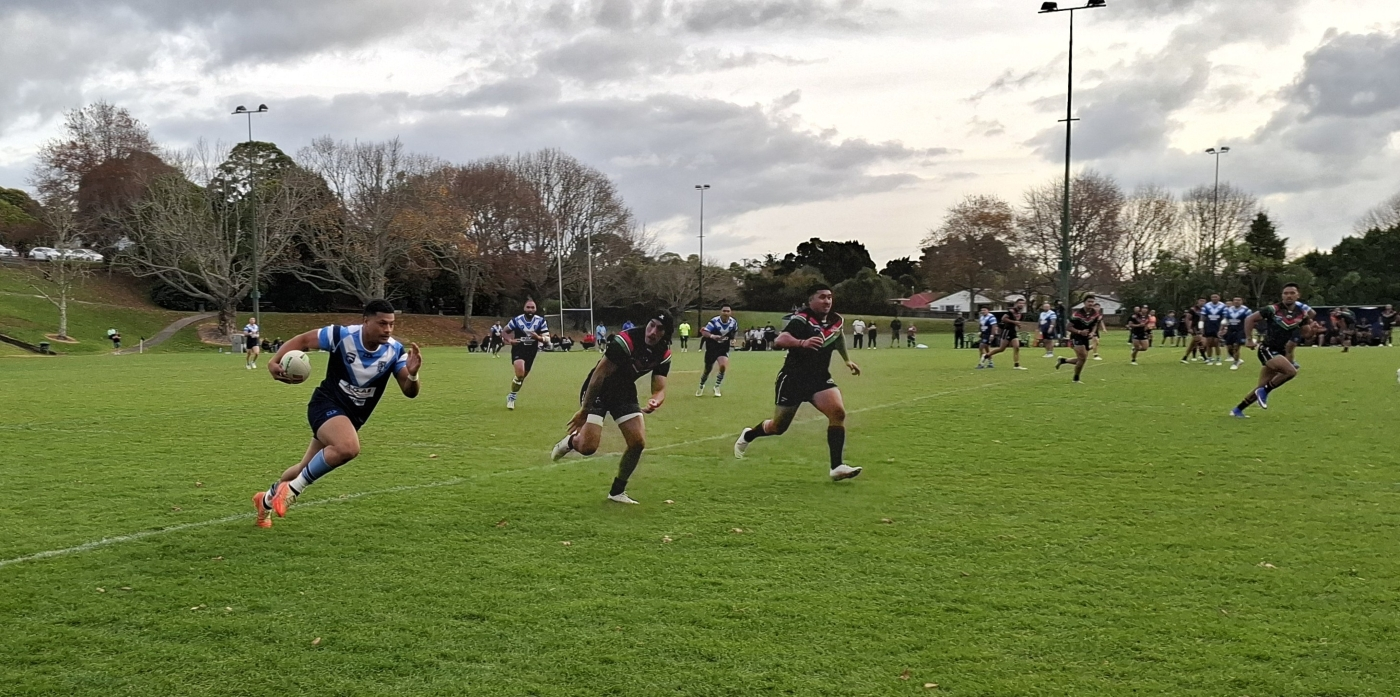
Patolo Taito making a break to score the final try after fielding the ball from a kick.

In the match of the round between the two unbeaten teams Otahuhu visited Blockhouse Bay and left easy 54-0 victors. They led 16-0 at halftime having exposed the left edge of Bay Roskill with two tries to Anthony Naitoko after their forwards had drawn the Vikings defence in. The second half saw Otahuhu running rampant, adding seven tries, including two to Toaiti Ramsay and three to Patolo Taito including a spectacular 60 metre effort when returning a kick. James Dowie added seven conversions including two from the touchline.

23 May	Bay Roskill	0-54 (0-16)	Otahuhu	Blockhouse Bay Reserve 4, Blockhouse Bay
2:30			Try: Anthony Naitoko 3 (22m, 31m, 53m), Taane Paki (36m), Tevita Mikaele (44m), Toaiti Ramsay 2 (48m, 70m), Patolo Taito 3 (59m, 65m, 80m); Con: James Dowie 7/10 (24m, 33m, 45m, 49m, 55m, 68m, 72m)	Referee: Anthony Eliott, TJ’s: Corey Jull and Tameilau Pauuvale

23 May	Mt Albert	12-10 (12-6)	Manukau	Fowlds Park 1, Morningside
2:30	Try: Phoenix Sorensen (8m), Solomon Vasuvulagi (17m), Ezekial Davidson Faaiuaso (24m); Con: Thompson Karena 0/2, Navajo Doyle 0/1		Try: Sisi Toutai (33m), Koronato John (59m); Con: Leti Muller 1/2 (35m)	Referee: Paki Parkinson, TJ’s: Liam Clayton and James Priest

23 May	Ponsonby	28-8 (10-4)	Papakura	Victoria Park 1, Central Auckland
2:30	Try: Andre Kahui-Singh (6m), Lelefu Sang Yum (23m), Dylan Tavita (62m), Li Taufoou (73m), Delano Atai (76m); Con: Dylan Tavita 4/5 (7m, 64m, 75m, 78m)		Try: Robin Proctor (38m), Isileli Matalave (44m); Con: Christopher Masina- Tuivai-Lopa 0/1, Lonnie Papani 0/1	Referee: Keven Ah Ken, TJ’s: Warren Clarke and Leigh Fletcher

23 May	Pt Chevalier	26-28 (12-22)	Marist	Walker Park 2, Pt Chevalier
2:30	Try: Jovlisi Jake Sloan (5m), Matagi-Blade Collins-Kamuhemu (37m), Lani Graham-Taufa (44m), Samuel Waterworth (75m), Compton Purcell (78m); Con: Jovlisi Jake Sloan (6m), Jamie Jnr Te Whata 2 (38m, 76m)		Try: Caleb Laiman (9m), Takaia Williams (17m), Afe Akau'ola (25m), Tama-Teahorangi Darlington 2 (32m, 71m); Con: Tama-Teahorangi Darlington 4/5 (11m, 26m, 34m, 72m)	Referee: David Millar, TJ’s: Curtis Wharewaka and Dayton Ryan

===== Round 6 =====
30 May	Marist	14-66 (8-32)	Bay Roskill	Murray Halberg Park 1, Owairaka
2:30	Try: Draven Sao (14m), William Poching (27m), Jerry Sulusi (52m); Con: Aria Cerei (52m)		Try: Xavier Tutaki 2 (1m, 73m), Jerome Vogel 2 (8m, 78m), Vincent Tupu 4 (10m, 21m, 49m, 75m), Cheoneth Henry (32m), Renouf Oge (36m), Timothy Vogel (64m), Wyatt Rangi (67m); Con: Carlos Davis 9/12 (2m, 9m, 22m, 37m, 50m, 68m, 74m, 77m, 79m)	Referee: David Millar, TJ's: Simon Bailey and Curtis Wharewaka

30 May	Mt Albert	16-25 (0-16)	Ponsonby	Fowlds Park 1, Morningside
2:30	Try: Marcus Fraser (42m), Kalepo Paualaisa (68m), Valentino Yandall (80m); Con: Navajo Doyle 2/3 (44m, 68m)		Try: Dylan Tavita (7m), Lelefu Sang Yum (22m), Tumanako Tumahai (40m), Amaramo Solomona (58m); Con: Dylan Tavita (9m, 40m, 59m); Pen: Dylan Tavita (49m); Drop: Dylan Tavita (68m)	Referee: Daniel Caddy, TJ's: Leigh Fletcher and Warren Clarke

30 May	Otahuhu	58-4 (30-0)	Manukau	Bert Henham Park 1, Ōtahuhu
2:30	Try: Mosese Faeamani 2 (6m, 34m), Patolo Taito (14m), Connor Taurua-Purcell (17m), Albert Vete (27m), Phoenix Hunt 2 (56m, 75m), Fine Vakautakakala 2 (63m, 72m), Tevita Mikaele (65m); Con: William Fakatoumafi 9/10 (7m, 15m, 18m, 28m, 35m, 58m, 63m, 73m, 76m)		Try: Karekake Holamotu (43m)	Referee: Keven Ah-Ken, TJ's: Corey Jull and Tamielau Pauuvale

30 May	Papakura	28-20 (10-8)	Pt Chevalier	Prince Edward Park 1, Papakura
2:30	Try: Jeff Tatupu (5m), Christopher James Masina Tuivai-Lopa (42m), Lonnie Papani (50m), Terrell Sala (69m), Talitua Salima-Satuia (80m); Con: Lorenzo Filimaua 3/4 (6m, 52m, 71m), Fuamaila Gatapu (80m)		Try: Parekaahu Keepa (28m), Jeriah Vagana (34m, 77m), Patrick Sipley (74m); Con: Noah Jensen 0/2, Jamie Jnr Te Whata 2/2 (75m, 78m)	Referee: Brent Newton, TJ's: James Priest and Dayton Ryan

===== Round 7 =====
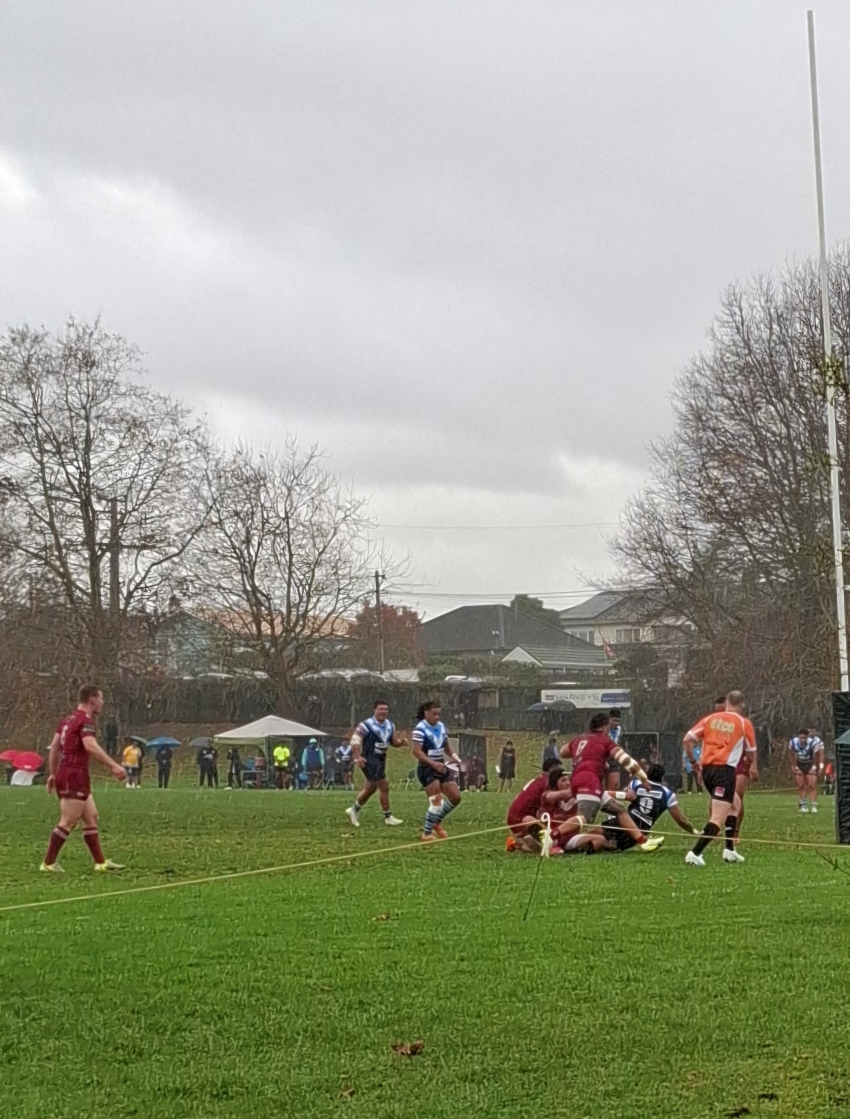
Phoenix Hunt scoring for Otahuhu.

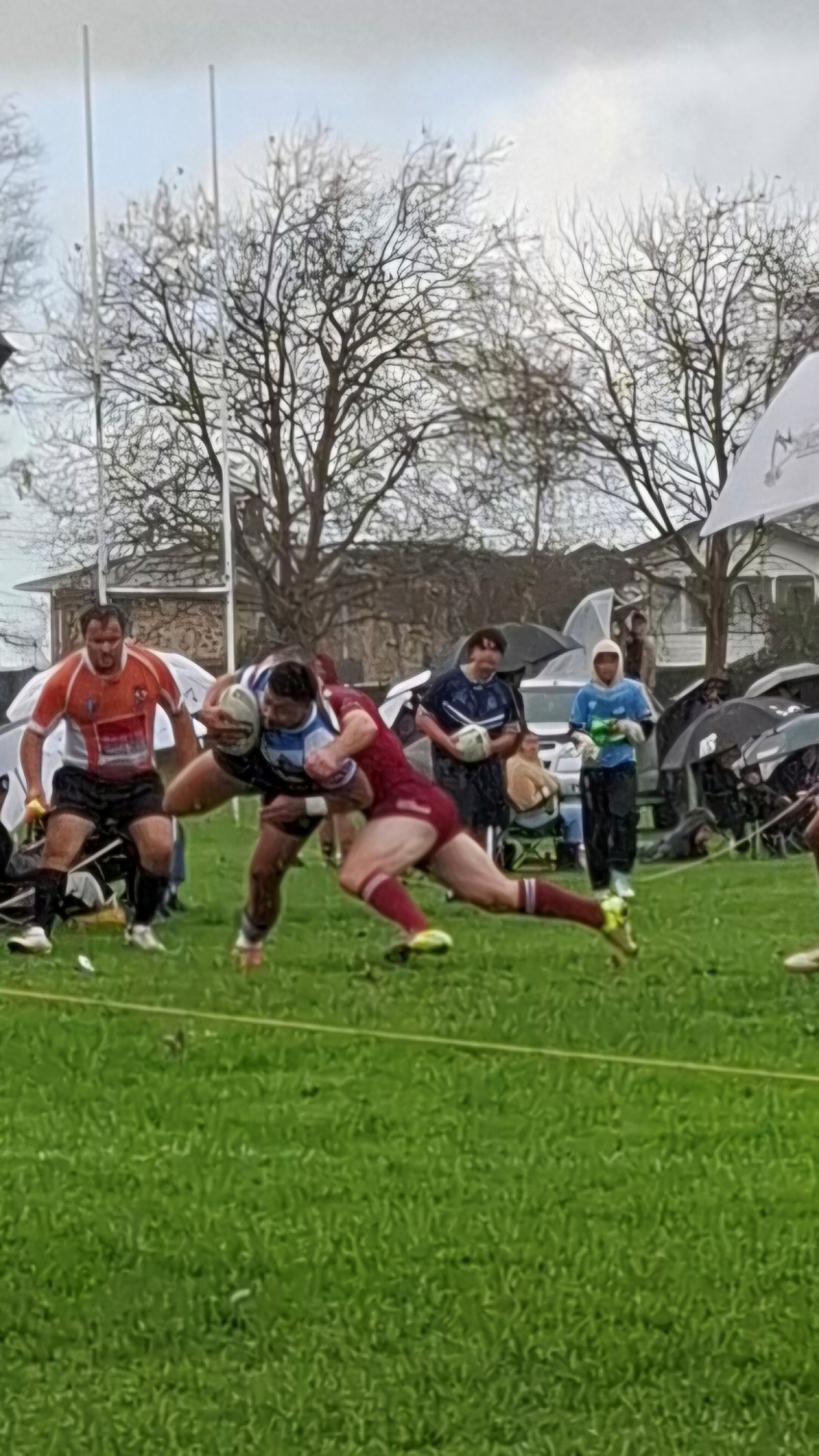
Patolo Taito scoring for Otahuhu.

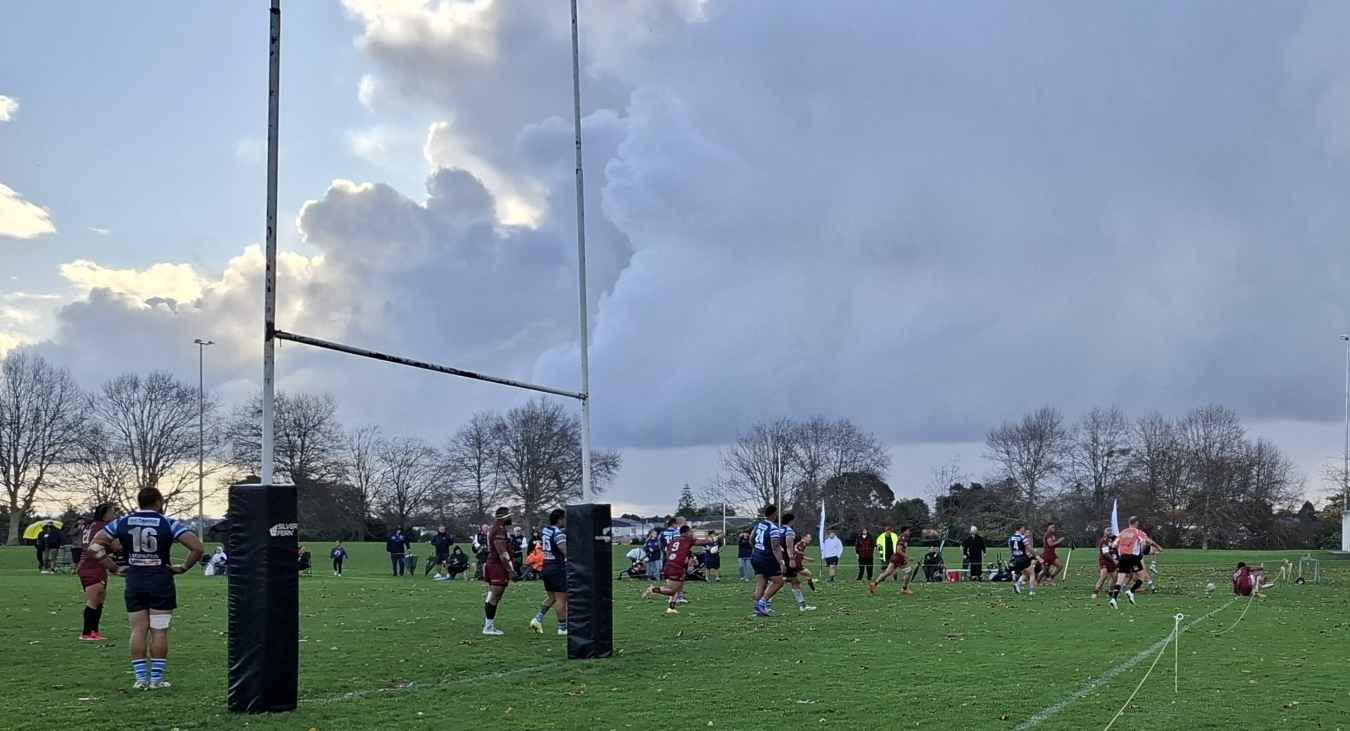
Siave Togoiu scoring after chasing a grubber kick just after the halftime siren.

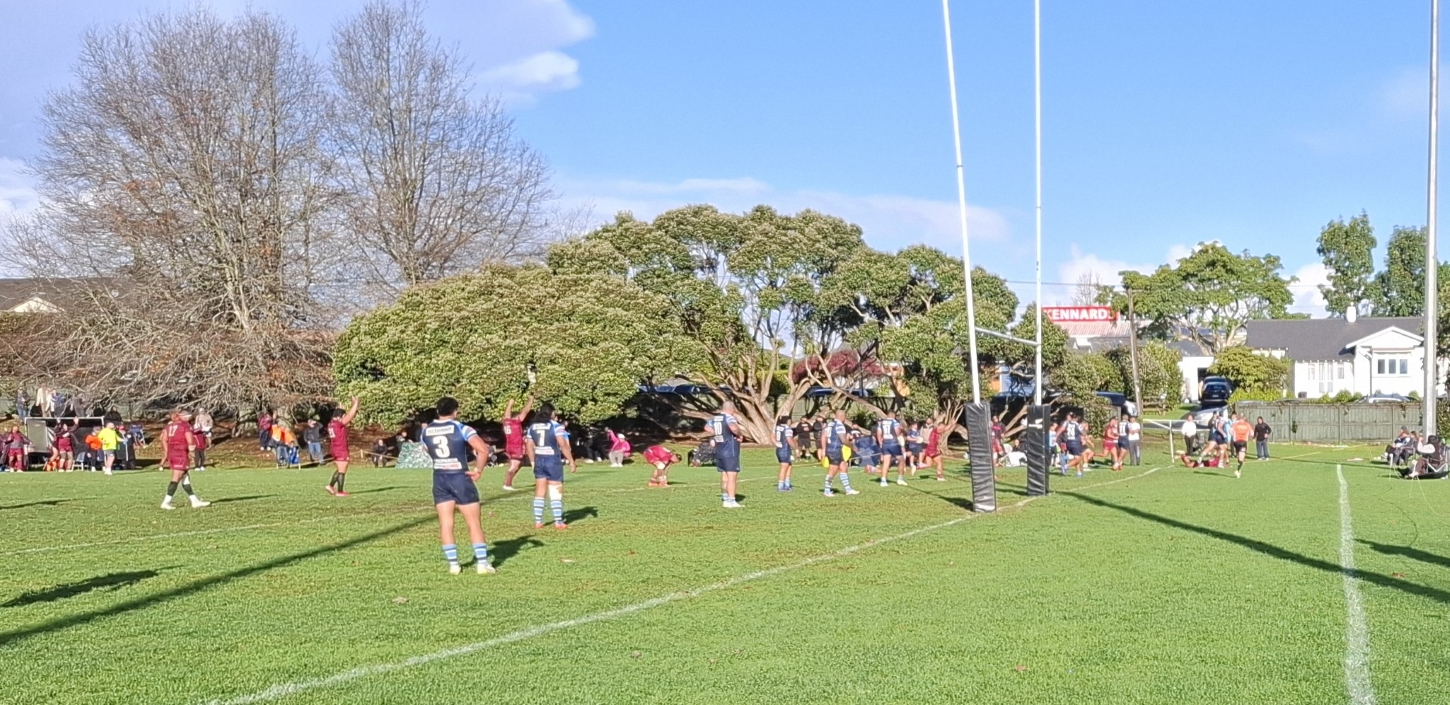
Siave Togoiu crossing for his second try for Papakura to give them a 14-10 lead.

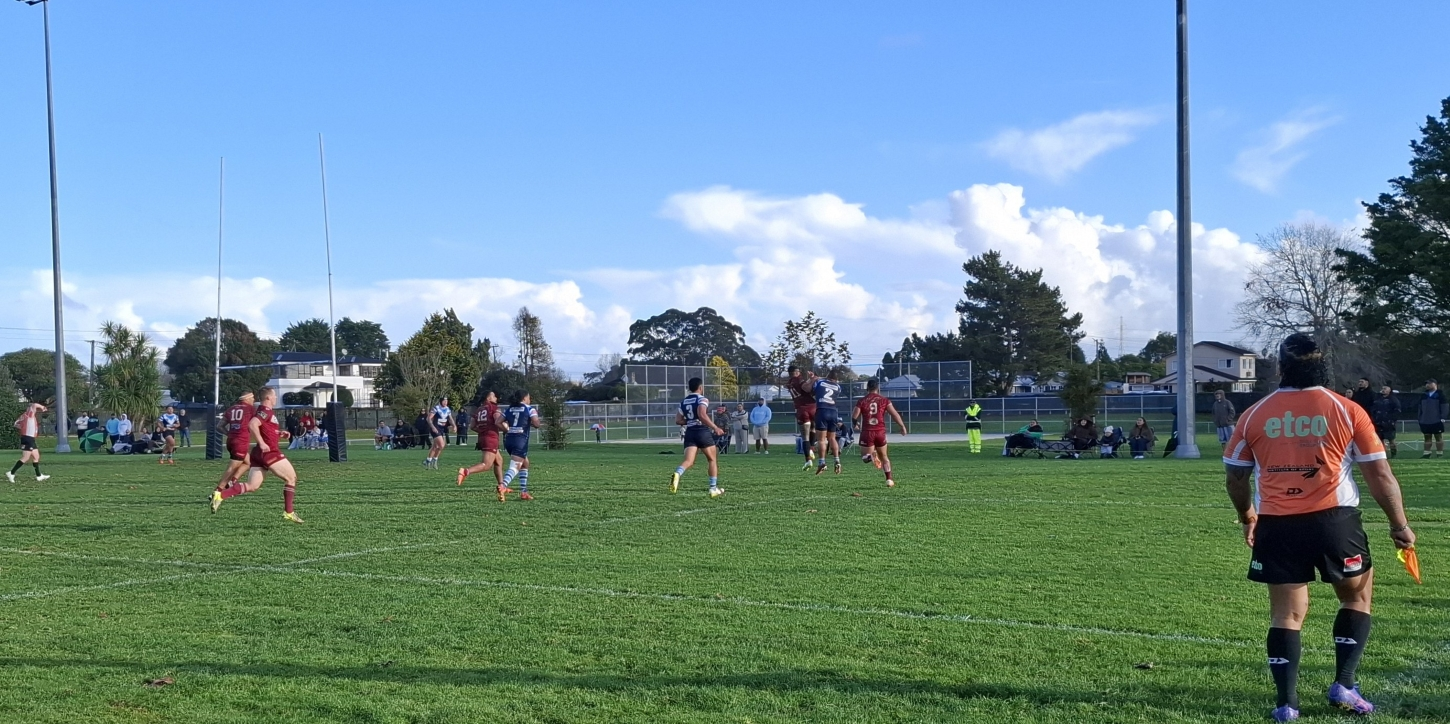
Jerry Poutu (Otahuhu) leaping to catch a kick from Luke Campbell of Papakura.

6 June	Bay Roskill	12-28 (6-8)	Manukau	Blockhouse Bay Reserve 4, Blockhouse Bay
2:30	Try: Xavier Tutaki (7m), Renouf Oge (65m); Con: Carlos Davis (8m), Cheoneth Henry (66m)		Try: Kahn Munokoa 2 (4m, 50m), Leti Muller (8m), Clive Tu'ifua (54m), Sisi Toutai 2 (70m, 75m); Con: Leti Muller 2/4 (56m, 72m)	Referee: Paki Parkinson, TJ's: Warren Clarke and Corey Jull

6 June	Marist	14-16 (6-12)	Mt Albert	Margaret Griffen Park 1, Mount Roskill
2:30	Try: William Payne (29m), Montell Tuese (43m), Ofa Ma'asi (64m); Con: Tama-Teahorangi Darlington 1/3 (30m)		Try: Thompson Karena (16m), Aston Fraser (37m), John Aitu (58m); Con: Navajo Doyle 1/2 (18m), Wiremu Makea 1/1 (39m)	Referee: Keven Ah-Ken, TJ's: James Priest and Dayton Ryan

6 June	Papakura	16-26 (10-10)	Otahuhu	Prince Edward Park 1, Ōtahuhu
2:30	Try: Lonnie Papani (9m), Siave Togoiu 2 (40m, 48m); Con: Fuamaila Gatapu 2/3 (40m, 50m)		Try: Phoenix Hunt (28m), Patolo Taito (31m), William Fakatoumafi (66m), Jamel Hunt (73m), Toaiti Ramsay (78m); Con: William Fakatoumafi 3/5 (29m, 75m, 80m)	Attendance: 250; Referee: Anthony Eliott, TJ's: Tamailau Pauuvale and Michael Une

6 June	Ponsonby	28-44 (10-24)	Pt Chevalier	Victoria Park 1, Auckland Central
2:30	Try: James Taumata 2 (13m, 45m), Andre Kahui-Singh (27m), Ben Wharton-Benedict (42m), Delano Atai (66m); Con: Dylan Tavita 4/5 (29m, 43m, 46m, 66m)		Try: Matagi-Blade Collins-Kamuhemu (4m), Mikaele Ilaiu (17m), Maxwell Wichman (22m), Daniel Smith (39m), Jovilisi Sloan (57m), Noah Jensen (62m), Shaun Sauni-esau (77m); Con: Noah Jensen 7/7 (5m, 18m, 24m, 40m, 59m, 64m, 79m); Pen: Noah Jensen 1/1 (72m)	Referee: Daniel Caddy, TJ's: Simon Bailey and Leigh Fletcher

===== Round 8 =====
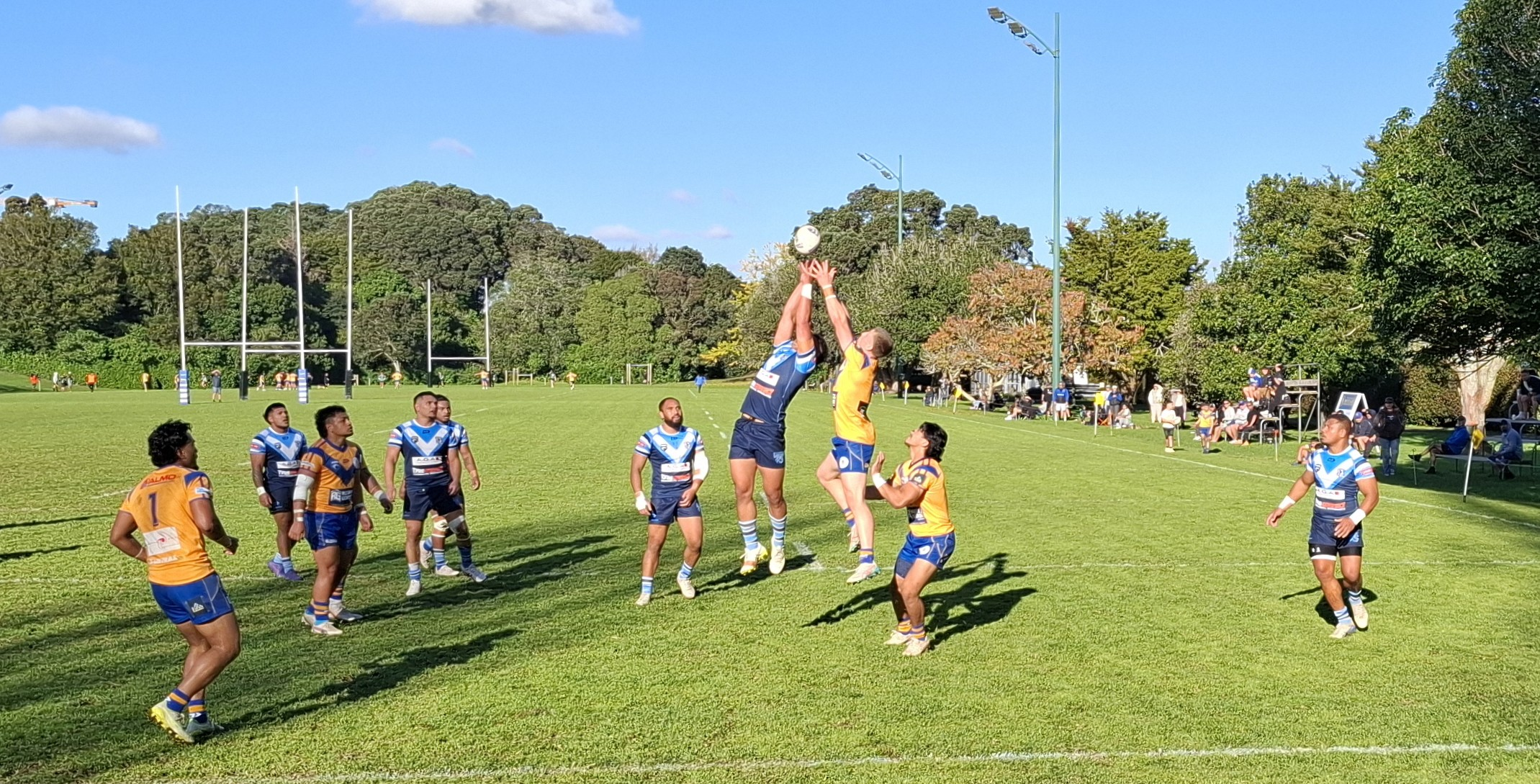
Antony Naitoko, the Otahuhu centre and Ollie Horgan on the wing for Mt Albert competing for a bomb at Fowlds Park.

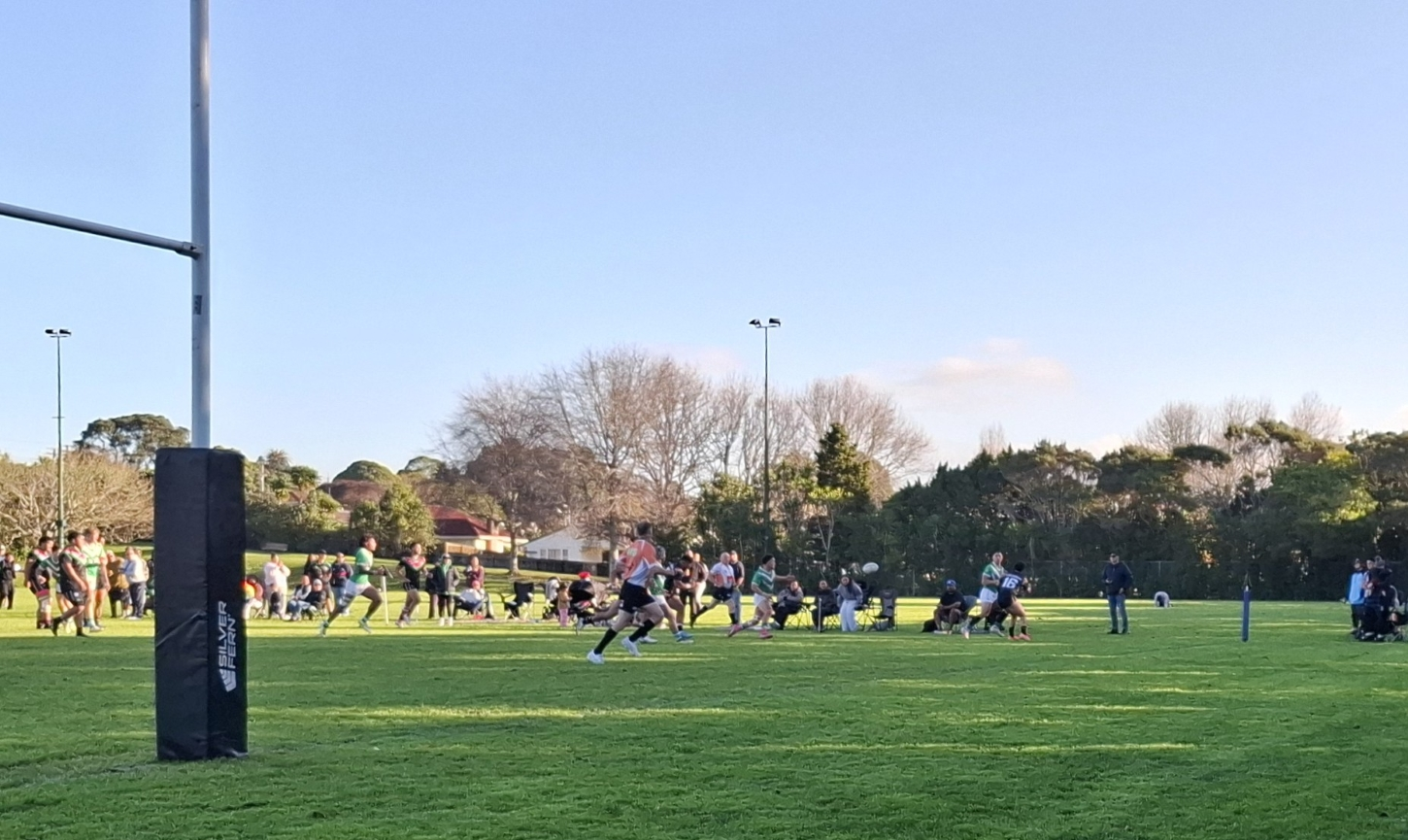
Shaun Solomona passing inside to Taipari Wikitera who scores to give Pt Chevalier a 24-0 lead over Bay Roskill.

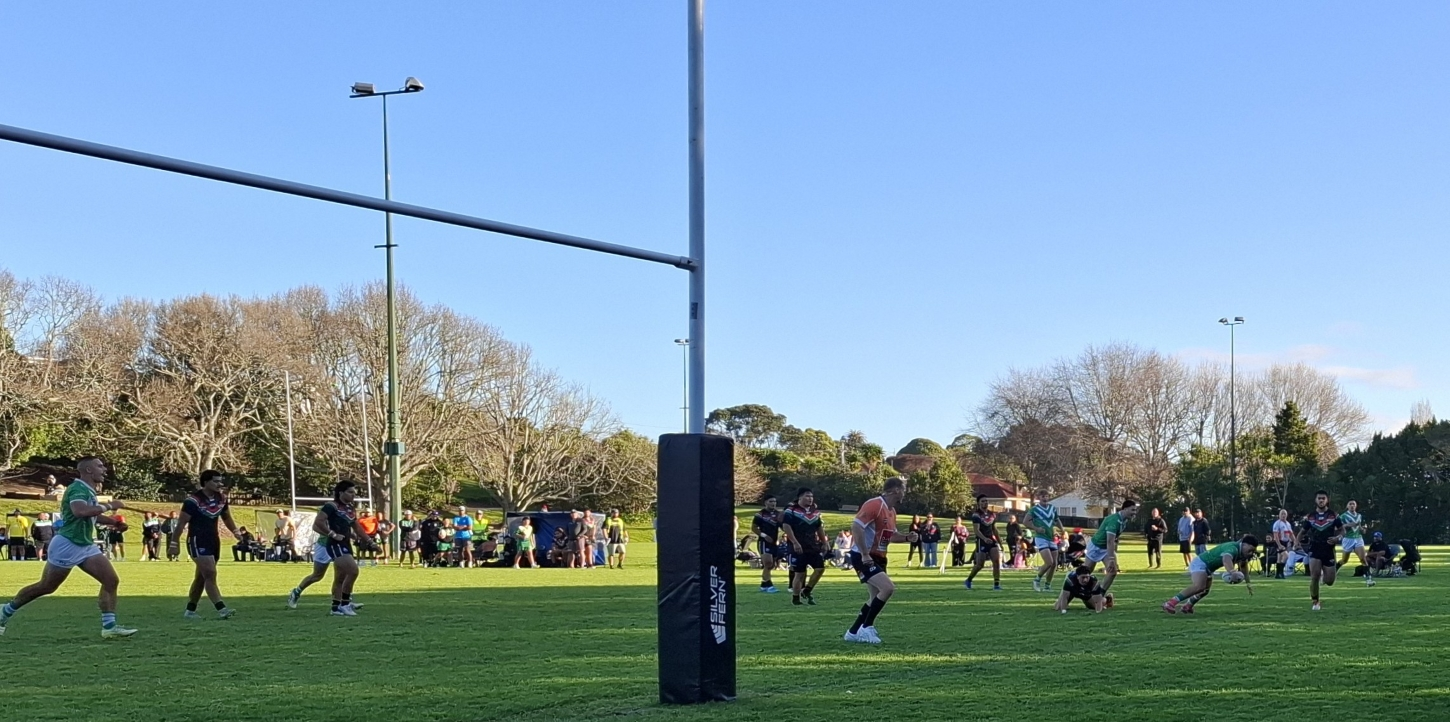
Lani Graham-Taufa scoring after collecting a Noah Jensen grubber kick.

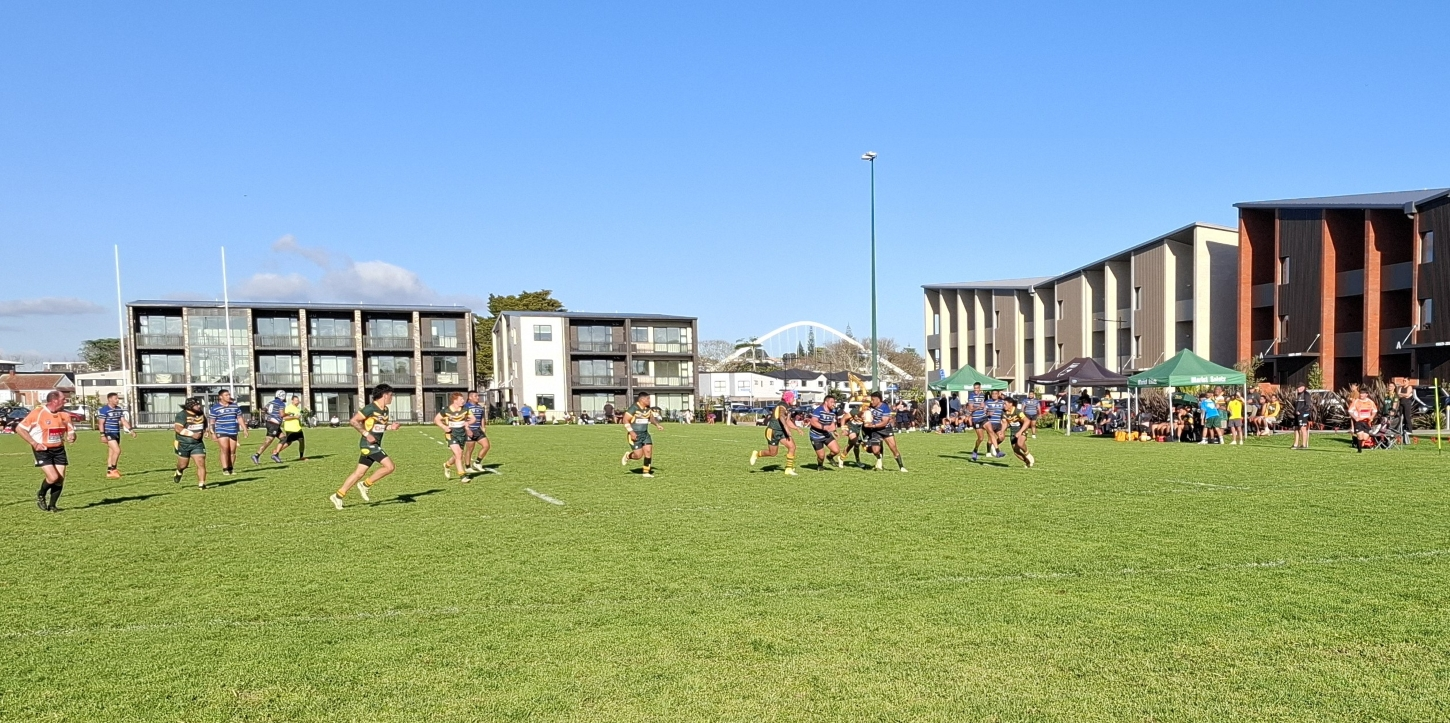
Saula Solomona carrying the ball for Ponsonby late in the first half of their 30-26 win over Marist.

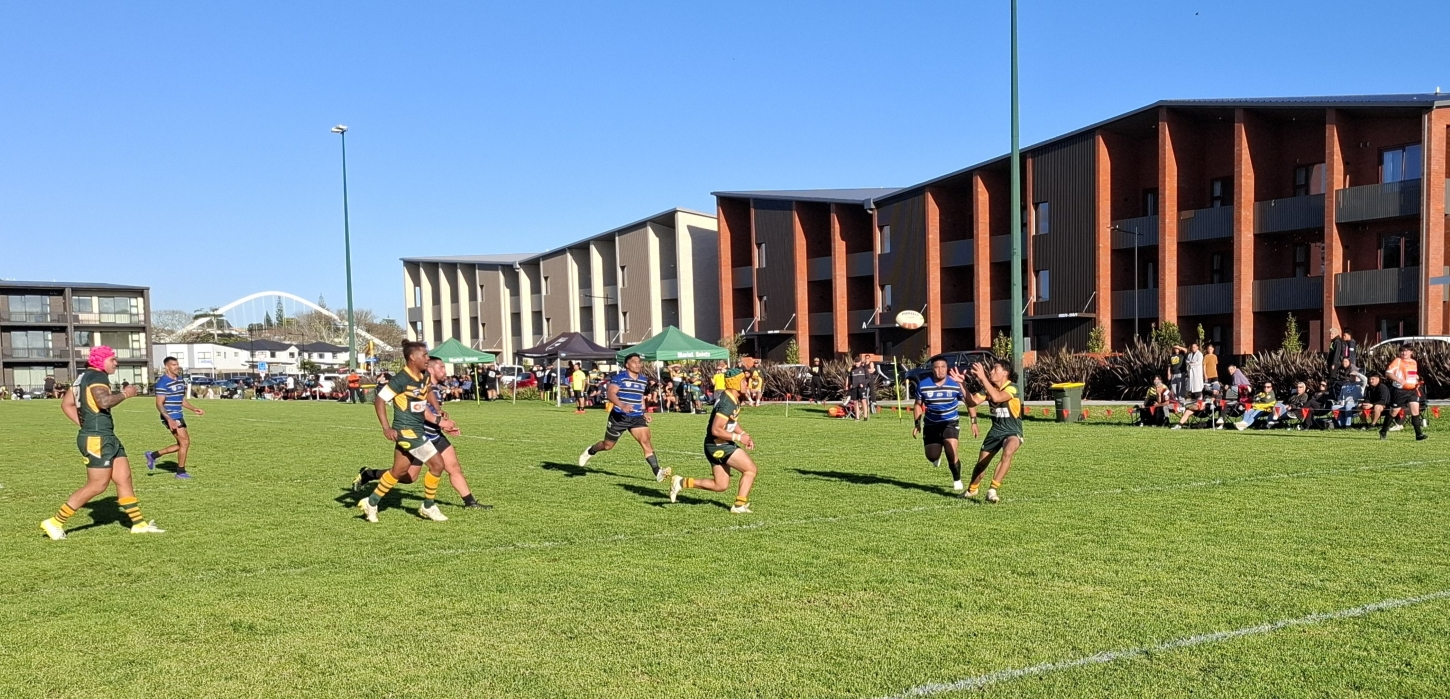
Lucas Viliamu (Marist) taking a chip bomb from Dylan Tavita (Ponsonby) near the end of the first half.

Otahuhu recorded their 25th consecutive win while Manukau and Ponsonby both leap-frogged Bay Roskill and Papakura into second and third in the standings. The visiting Point Chevalier side thrashed Bay Roskill 42-0 with three first half tries and five more in the second half to eight different players. The flood gates opened immediately in the second half with tries to Lucas Carmine (41st minute), Taipari Wikitera (44th minute), and Lani Graham-Taufa in the 47th minute. The later was laid on by Noah Jensen with a clever grubber kick, while he also added five conversions. Former Te Atatu player, Khalan Clyde also scored a try on debut for Point Chevalier with a characteristic run from dummy half. At Fowlds Park, the two finalists from 2025 met for the second time this season with Otahuhu running out 26-4 winners. Bostyn Hakaraia opened the scoring for Otahuhu in the 2nd minute after trailing in support of Toaiti Ramsay who flung the ball back in field near the try line, but Mt Albert provided staunch opposition for much of the first half before Taane Paki scored for Otahuhu just before halftime with James Dowie's conversion giving them a 10-0 lead. Habasaloma Tamarua gave Mt Albert hope of an upset when he scored in the 50th minute following a combined effort by him and John Aitu saw them run 70m in the lead up, but then Otahuhu took control as they so often have in the second half, scoring tries to Viliami Tahitua, Connor Taurua-Purcell, and Jerry Poutu on full time. At Moyle Park Isileli Matalave opened the scoring for Papakura after Manukau winger Sisi Toutai was being manhandled in a two man tackle and threw the ball away near his try line. Kahn Munokoa levelled the scores in the 23rd minute when he ran 10 metres to dive over in the right corner. Chistian-Jordan Tupou then gave them the lead late in the first half after running in support of Jahrome Falemoe-Afamasaga who he had just put through a hole in the defence. Leti Muller's conversion gave Manukau a 10-4 lead at halftime. Papakura scored first in the second half when Kahn Munokoa dropped a bomb and Christopher Tuivai-Lopa picked up the loose ball and ran in to score. Fuamaila Gatapu failed to level the scores when he missed the easy conversion. Clive Tu'ifua then ran at a hole on the last tackle in the 64th minute to score with Muller's conversion giving the home side an eight point lead. George Tuihalangingie scored in the 75th minute when Papakura failed to control a grubber kick in front of their posts and then Paea Fotu scored on full time in the left corner to give Manukau a 26-8 win. At Murray Halberg Park the visiting Ponsonby side took a 16-0 lead after just 13 minutes but Marist fought their way back into the game and only trailed 22-20 in the 65th minute when Siapo Pasene was awarded a controversial try after he appeared to have been touched by a defender with the ball carrying arm on the ground just short of the try line. Dylan Tavita's kick missed meaning Marist were still in touch and then Jahvaan Manukau Powell slipped through the defence on the left edge to score with Aria Cerei's conversion tying the score at 26-26 with six minutes to play. Marist however dropped the ball from the kickoff and Dylan Tavita scored after spinning over from dummy half and they hung on to win.

13 June	Bay Roskill	0-42 (0-14)	Pt Chevalier	Blockhouse Bay Reserve 4, Blockhouse Bay
2:30			Try: Matagi-Blade Collins-Kamuhemu (16m), Shaun Sauni-Esau (28m), Patrick Sipley (40m), Lucas Carmine (41m), Taipari Wikitera (44m), Lani Graham-Taufa (48m), Khalan Clyde (58m), Sefanaia Cowley-Lupo (71m); Con: Noah Jensen 5/8 (40m, 43m, 49m, 58m, 73m)	Attendance: 300; Referee: Anthony Eliott, TJ's: Tamailau Pauuvale and Leigh Fletcher

13 June	Mt Albert	4-26 (0-10)	Otahuhu	Fowlds Park, Morningside
2:30	Try: Habasaloma Tamarua (50m)		Try: Bostyn Hakaraia (2m), Taane Paki (38m), Viliami Tahitua (67m), Connor Taurua-Purcell (77m), Jerry Poutu (80m); Con: William Fakatoumafi 0/1, James Dowie 3/4 (38m, 68m, 80m)	Attendance: 300; Referee: David Millar, TJ's: Corey Jull and James Priest

13 June	Manukau	26-8 (10-4)	Papakura	Moyle Park, Māngere
2:30	Try: Kahn Munokoa (23m), Chistian-Jordan Tupou (34m), Clive Tu'ifua (64m), George Tuihalangingie (75m), Paea Fotu (80m); Con: Leti Muller 3/5 (36m, 66m, 76m)		Try: Isileli Matalave (5m), Christopher James Masina Tuivai-Lopa (51m); Con: Fuamaila Gatapu 0/2	Referee: Keven Ah-Ken, TJ's: Michael Une and Curtis Wharewaka

13 June	Marist	26-30 (14-16)	Ponsonby	Murray Halberg Park, Owairaka
2:30	Try: William Ian John Payne 2 (19m, 49m), Lucas Viliamu (29m), Jahvaan Manukau Powell 2 (35m, 71m); Con: Aria Cerei 3/5 (36m, 51m, 73m)		Try: Timor Williams (5m), Dylan Tavita 2 (8m, 76m), Amaramo Solomona (12m), Levi Helleur-Atiga (41m), Siapo Pasene (66m); Con: Dylan Tavita 3/6 (9m, 13m, 42m)	Referee: Brent Newton, TJ's: Dayton Ryan and Paul Lorigan

===== Round 9 =====
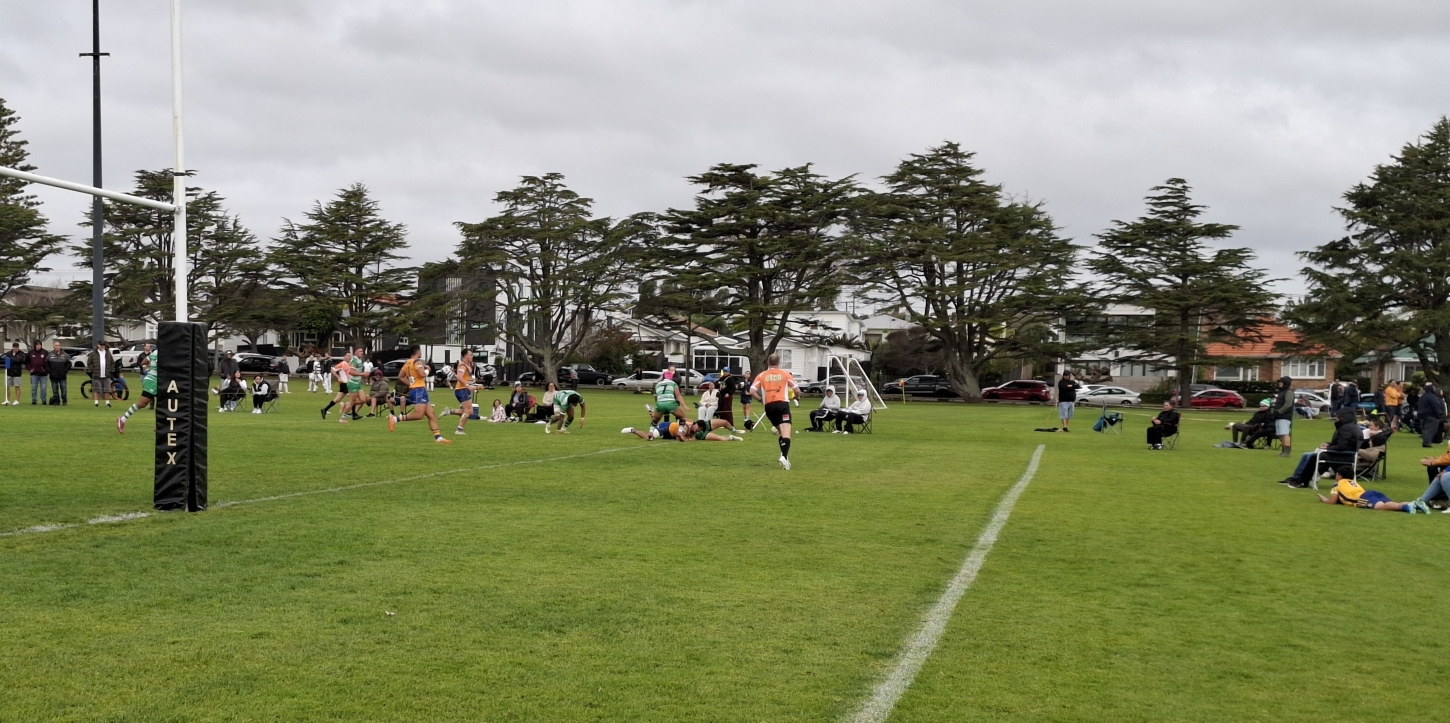
Kalepo Paualaisa losing the ball on the try line for Mt Albert after a break down the right edge.

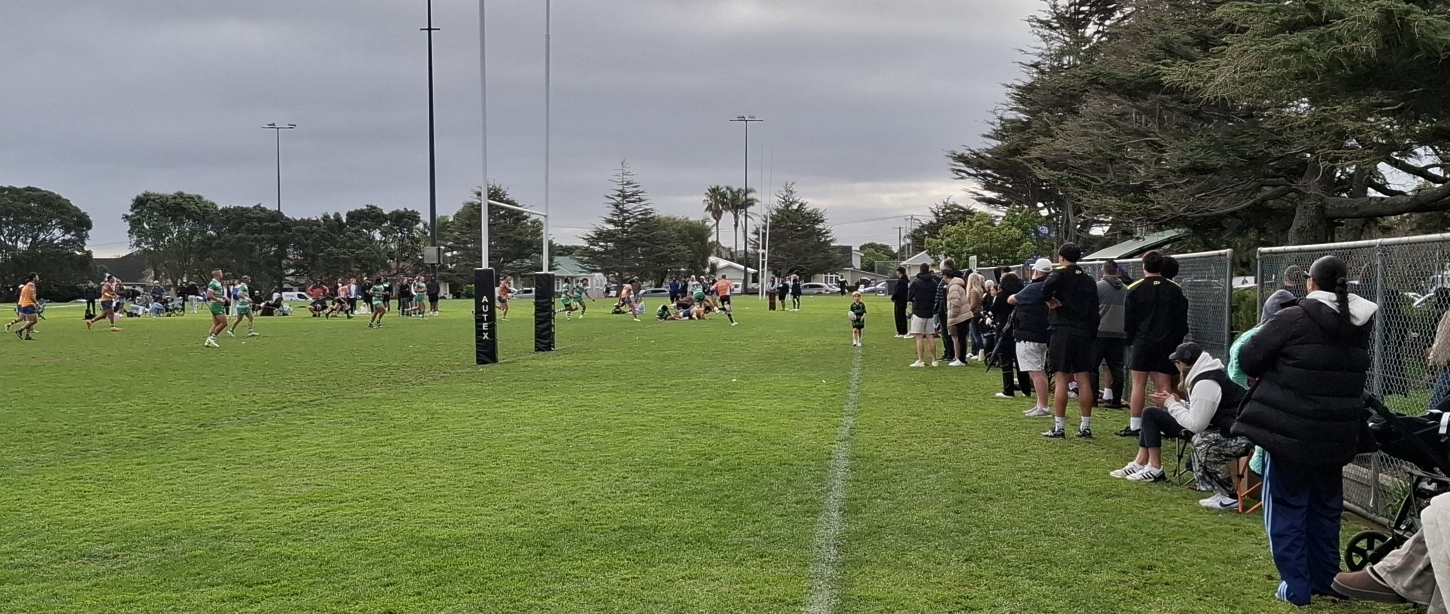
Paualaisa scoring early in the second half to give Mt Albert a 10-4 lead.

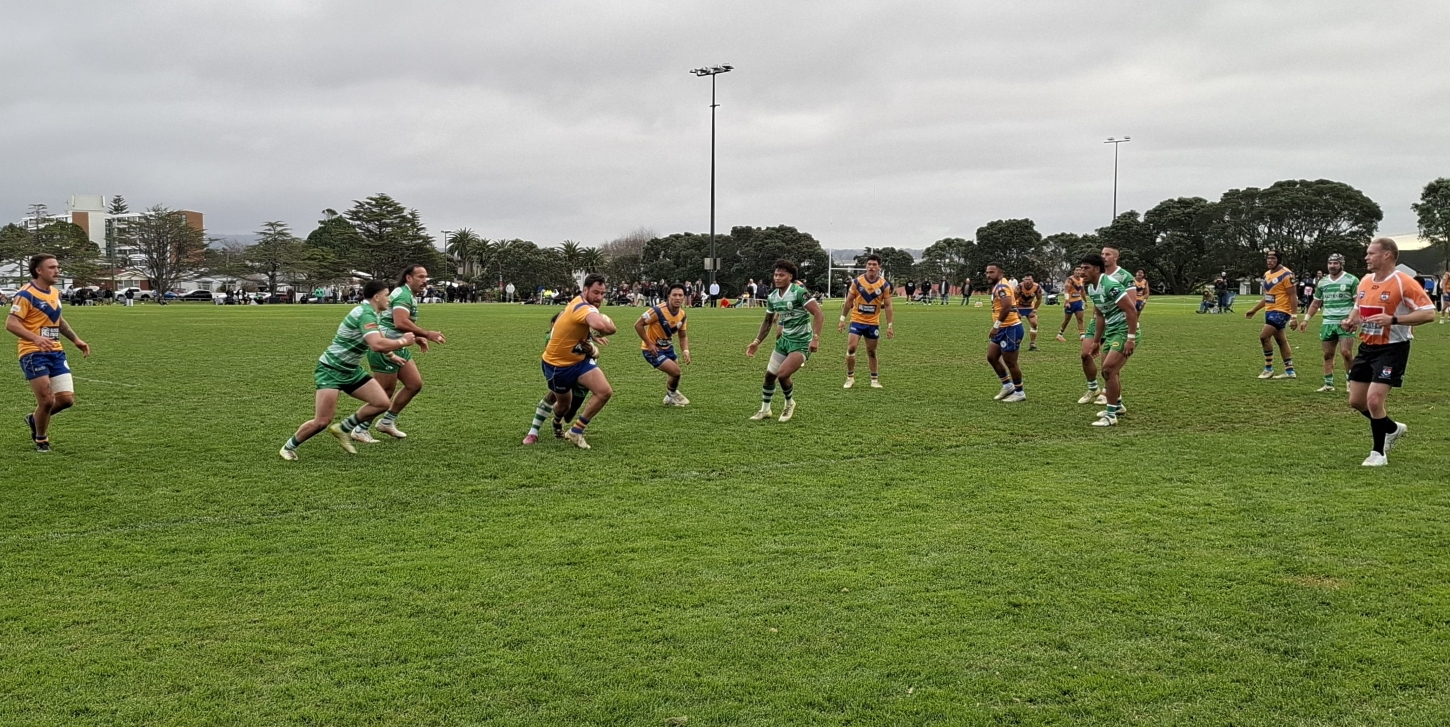
Api Pewhairangi scoring the first of his two tries in his season debut for Mt Albert.

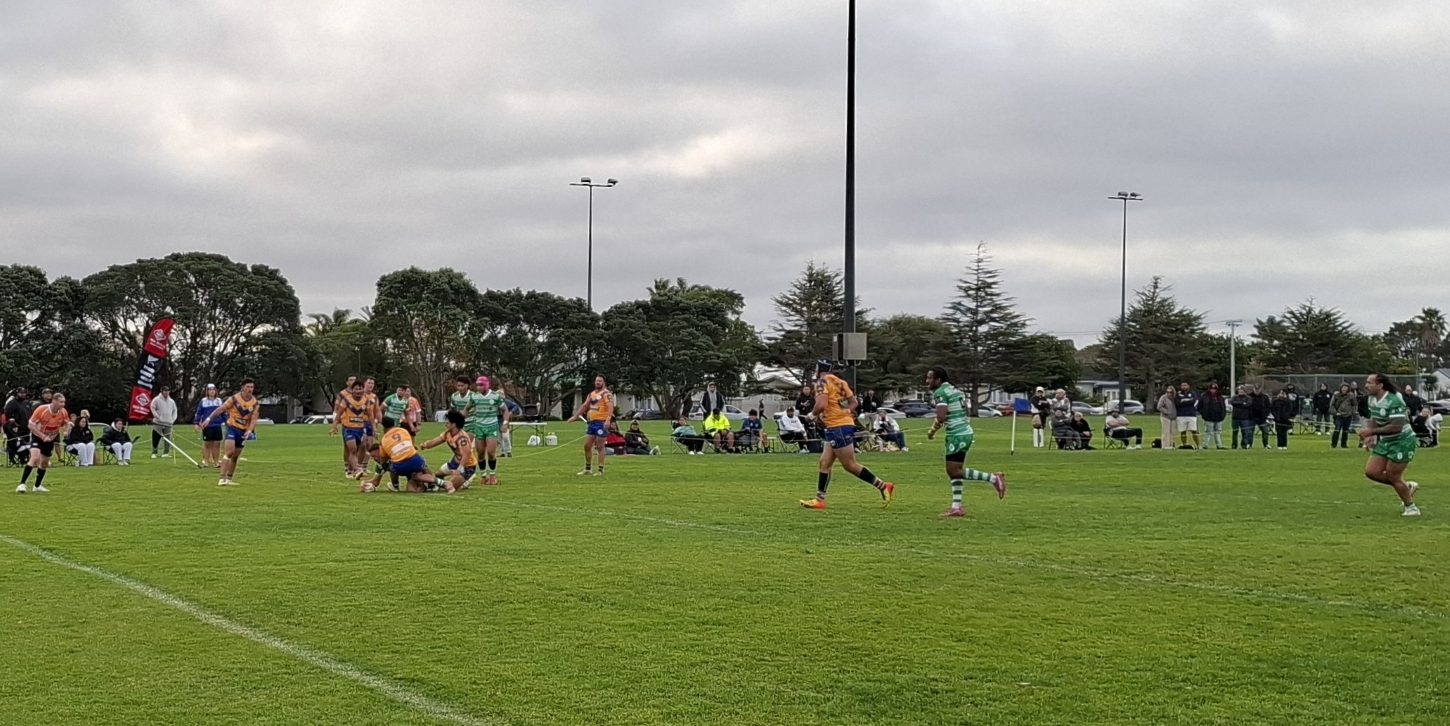
Maxwell Wichman scoring for Pt Chevalier to make the narrow the score 16-8 in the 70th minute.

Mt Albert caused a slight upset at Walker Park with a 22-8 win over Pt Chevalier. Api Pewhairangi made his first appearance of the year for Mt Albert and controlled the game for them in the halves. He also scored two tries using his fend and footwork in the second half. The game was evenly contested and Mt Albert only led by 6 points to 4 at halftime. Mt Albert was the more enterprising of the two sides though lacked finish at times. For Pt Chevalier, Pat Sipley and Daniel Sausau were dangerous when carrying the ball but were unable to break through the Lions solid defence. Maxwell scored a try in each half for the Pirates only points. Bay Roskill bounced back from their heavy defeat the week before to upset the home team at Prince Edward Park in Papakura. Papakura led 14-10 at halftime after Talita Salima-Saitua scored in the first minute, and interestingly also scored in the final minute of the game. Bay Roskill dominated the early stages of the second half running in three tries to take a 24-14 lead which they never surrendered with Utterance Tanielu's 73rd minute try and Ben Henry's conversion all but sealing the victory to move up into 3rd position in the standings. Marist were seeking just their second win of the year but fell away to lose 36-6 to Manukau. Marist scored first when William Poching scored in the 12th minute with Tama-Teahorangi Darlington converting however they were the only points they scored. Manukau took a 12-6 halftime lead when Aisake Tauatina scored both of their opening tries. Kuros Metuariki also scored twice while Leti Muller converted four of their seven tries. Ponsonby opened the scoring at Victoria Park when Timor Williams scored with competition leading point scorer Dylan Tavita converting. However Otahuhu then ran in 32 unanswered points between the 8th minute and the 47th minute with Albert Vete scoring twice. Ponsonby threatened a big comeback when Ban Wharton-Benedict and Li Taufoou scored tries and Tavita brought up his 100th point of the season when he converted Waharton-Benedict's try. With 20 minutes left they only trailled 32-18 but Otahuhu once again finished strongly and Joshua Cooper sealed the game with a 73rd minute try. James Dowie converted five of their seven tries.

20 June	Papakura	24-30 (14-10)	Bay Roskill	Prince Edward Park 1, Papakura
2:30	Try: Talitua Salima-Satuia 2 (1m, 80m), Jarney Proctor (12m), Sione Kivalu (39m), Christopher Tuivai-Lopa (64m); Con: Fuamaila Gatapu (13m, 65m)		Try: Ezra Vogel (21m), Nixon Leaso (32m), Vincent Tupu (43m), AJ Tauafao-Fa'alogo (48m), Utterance Tanielu (73m) Zion Tanielu Seiuli (54m); Con: Carlos Davis (33m, 45m), Ben Henry (75m)	Referee: Keven Ah Ken, TJ's: James Priest and Michael Une

20 June	Pt Chevalier	8-22 (4-6)	Mt Albert	Walker Park 2, Pt Chevalier
2:30	Try: Maxwell Wichman 2 (31m, 70m)		Try: Tommy Beale (18m), Kalepo Paualaisa (48m), Api Pewhairangi 2 (60m, 78m); Con: Navajo Doyle 3/4 (19m, 52m, 80m)	Referee: Anthony Eliott, TJ's: Tameilau Pauuvale and Corey Jull

20 June	Marist	6-36 (6-10)	Manukau	Murray Halberg Park 1, Owairaka
2:30	Try: William Poching (12m); Con: Tama-Teahorangi Darlington (14m)		Try: Aisake Tauatina 2 (17m, 33m), Kuros Metuariki 2 (42m, 57m), Toporo Purotu (47m), Viliami Kuli (54m), Paea Folau (66m); Con: Leti Muller (18m, 43m, 48m, 67m)	Referee: Brent Newton, TJ's: Warren Clarke and Paul Lorigan

20 June	Ponsonby	18-38 (6-22)	Otahuhu	Victoria Park 1, Auckland Central
2:30	Try: Timor Williams (3m), Ben Wharton-Benedict (51m), Li Taufoou (58m); Con: Dylan Tavita (4m, 43m, 59m)		Try: Patolo Taito (8m), Antony Naitoko (32m), Fine Vakautakakala (35m), Albert Vete 2 (38m, 46m), Viliami Tahitua (41m), Joshua Cooper (73m); Con: James Dowie 5/7 (33m, 36m, 40m, 43m, 47m)	Referee: David Millar, TJ's: Curtis Wharewaka and Leigh Fletcher

===== Round 10 =====
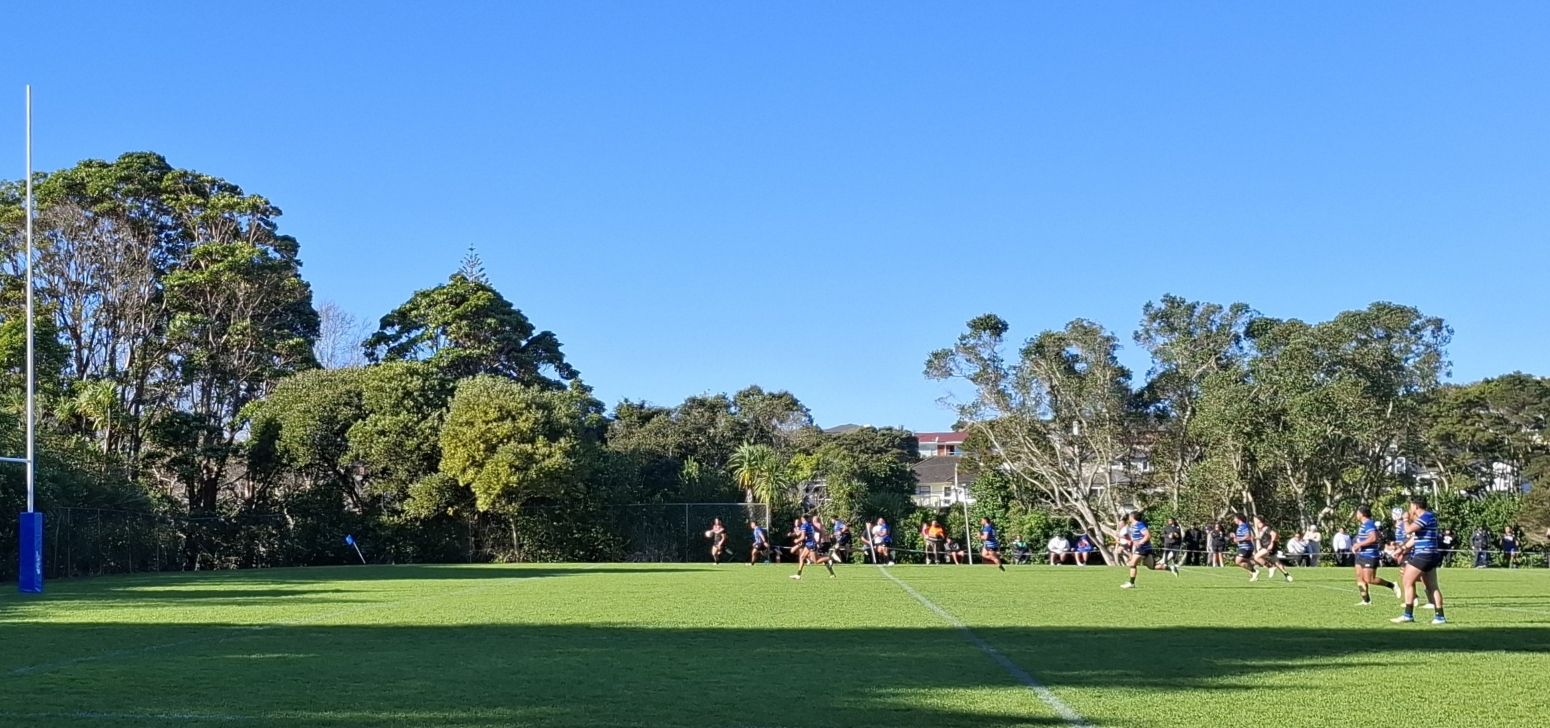
Josh Tanielu opening the scoring in the 2nd minute for Bay Roskill.

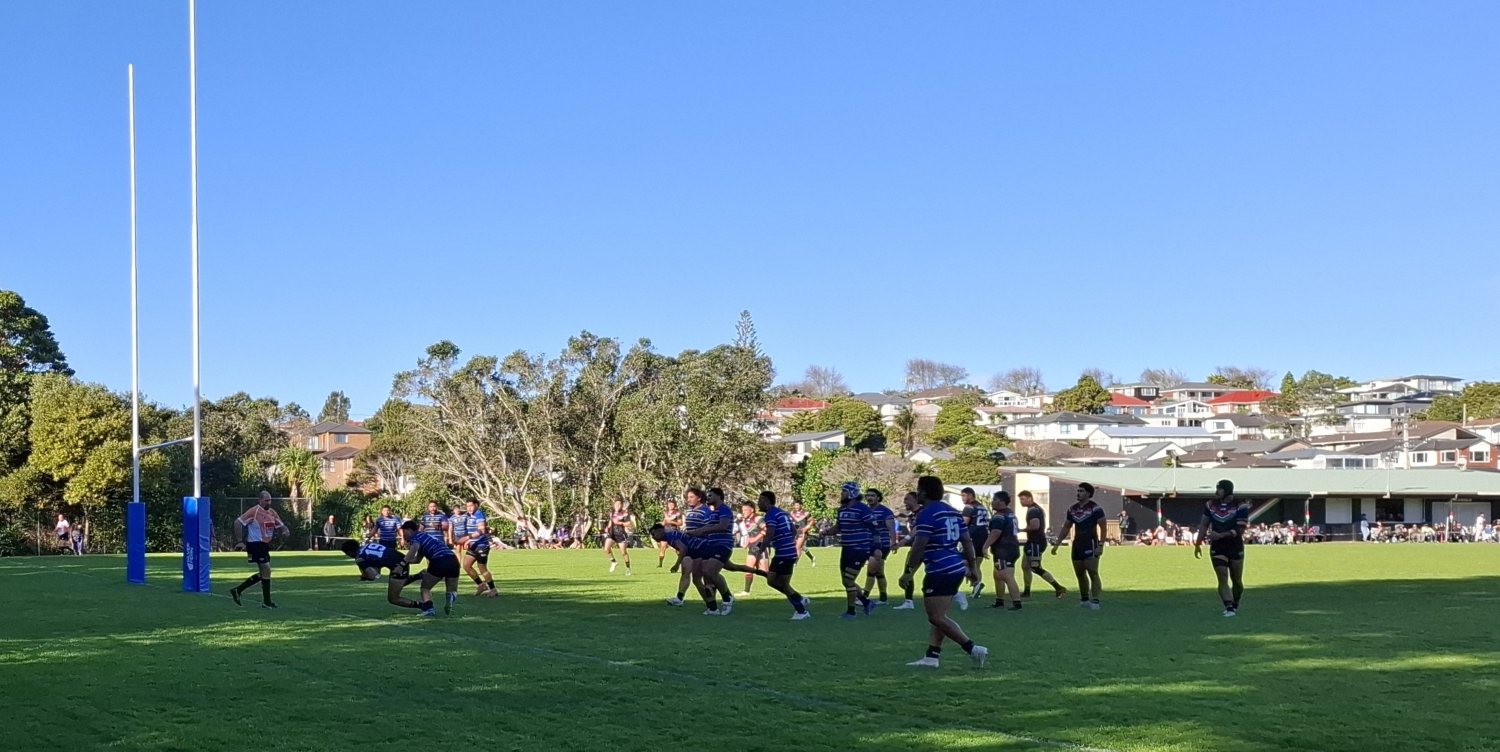
Nixon Leaso giving Bay Roskill an 8-0 lead.

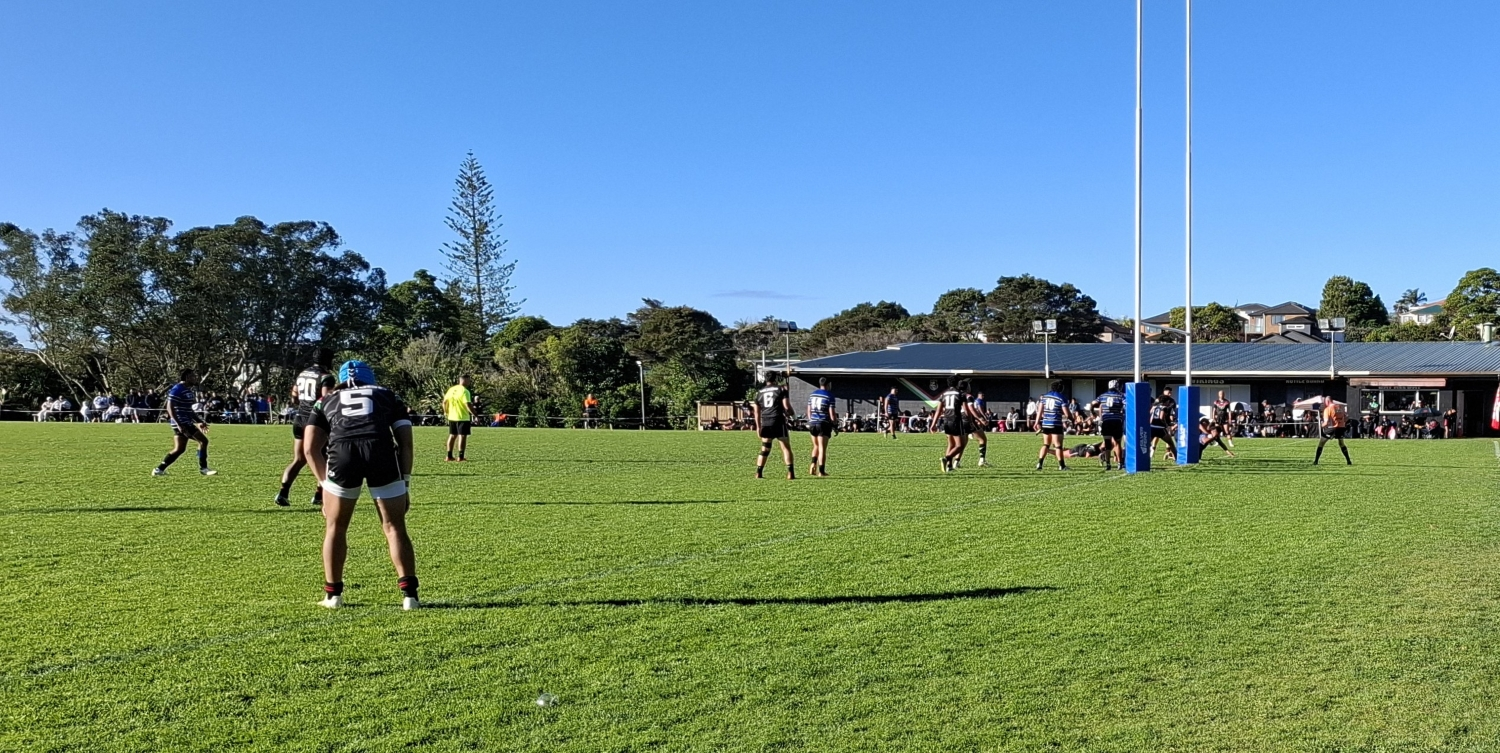
Dylan Tavita powering over next to the posts for Ponsonby.

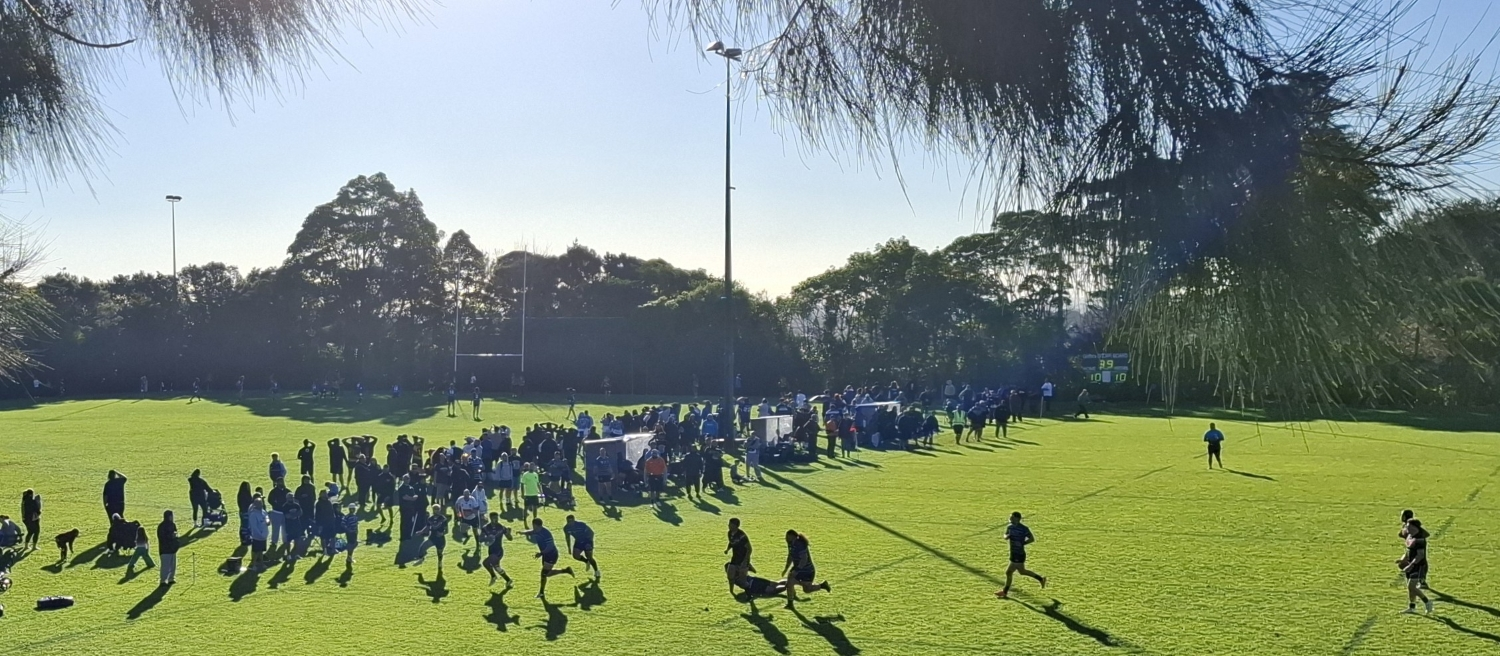
Josh Tanielu using his fend to break through and score early in the second half.

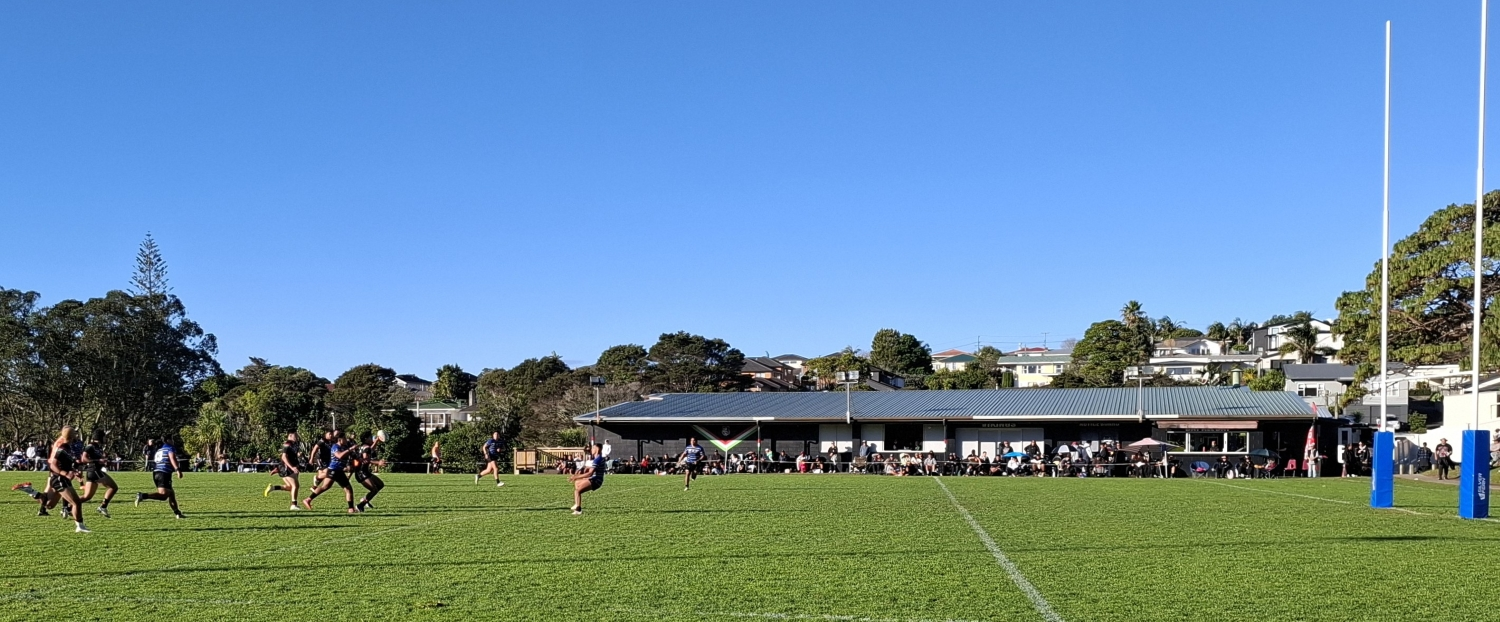
Nixon Leaso scoring his second try after retrieving a chip kick to give Bay Roskill an 18-10 lead in the 46th minute.

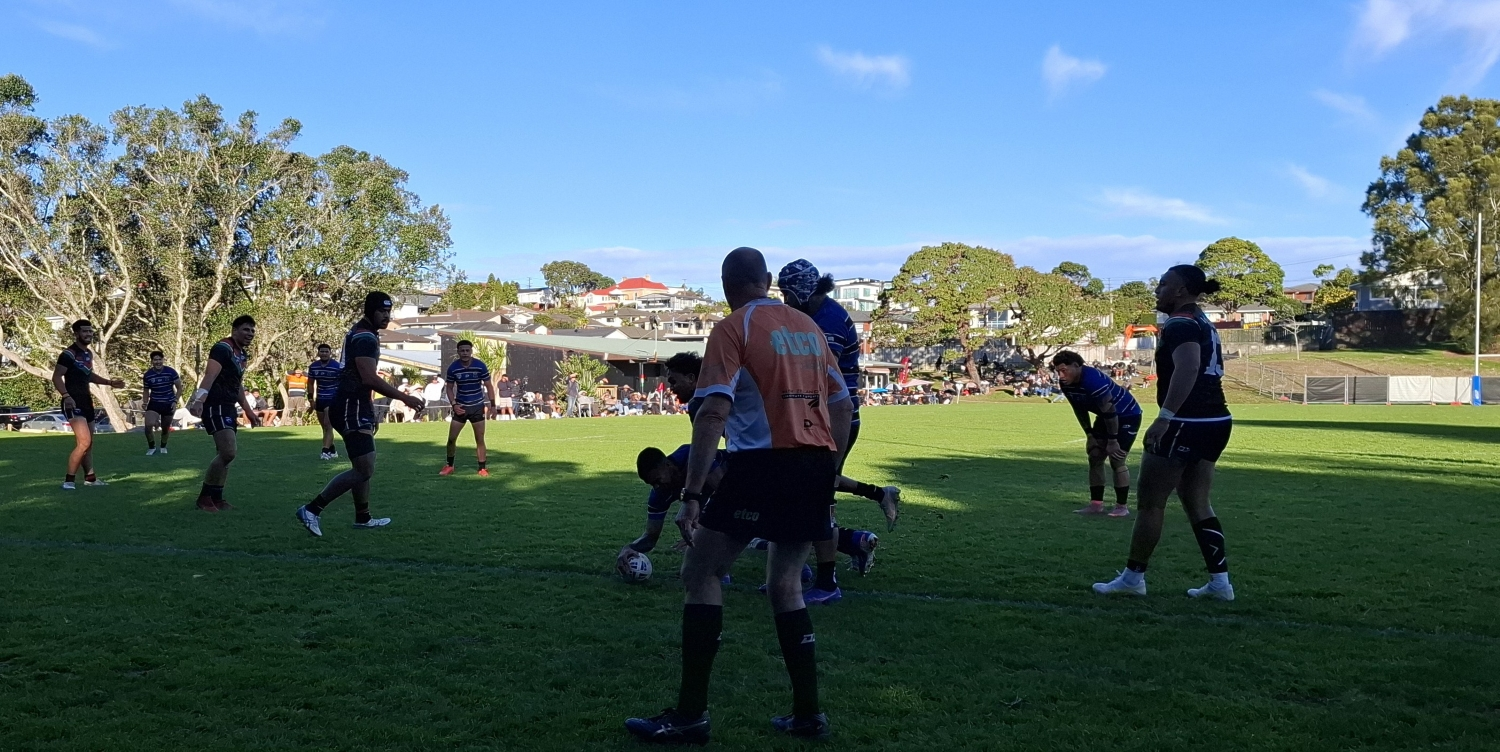
Andre Kahui-Singh bursts through from dummy half to score in the 52nd minute.

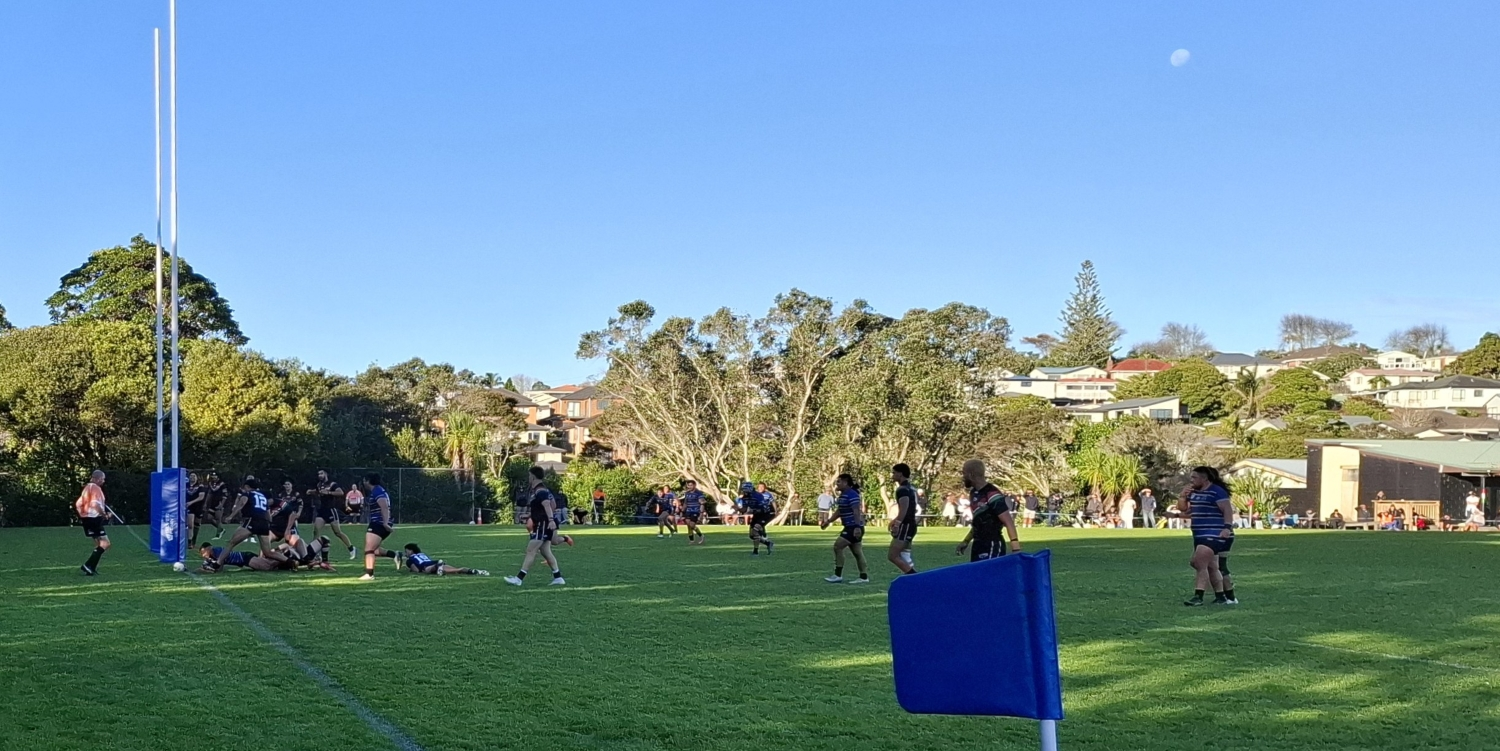
Andre Kahui-Singh seals the win for Ponsonby with his second try four minutes from full time.

Ponsonby won an entertaining match at the Blockhouse Bay Reserve against the Bay Roskill Vikings after twice coming from behind. Josh Tanielu opened the scoring with an individual try from halfway, before Nixon Leaso extended the lead in the 11th minute after also cutting through the defence from a scrum near the try line. Saula Solomona and Dylan Tavita tries leveled the scores 10-10 at halftime. The second half saw the game see-sawing with Josh Tanielu and Nixon Leaso both scoring tries, Leaso's a skillful piece of work regathering a chip kick with his left hand above his head to sprint in behind the posts to give the Vikings a 20-10 lead. Andrew Kahui-Singh dived over from dummy half for Ponsonby, then Zion Tanielu-Seiuli broke through on halfway and raced around the full back to restore their lead back to 26-16. Ponsonby then stormed home, scoring tries to Delano Atai, Victor Kenese, and Andre-Kahui-Singh with two converted by Tavita to snatch the win the leap over Bay Roskill into third in the standings. Mt Albert beat Papakura 26-22 after a Solomon Vasuvulagi try in the 76th minute. Former North Harbour rugby union representative, Luke Campbell opened the scoring for Papakura with a try where he beat the Mt Albert full back to scramble over in the 19th minute. Then after a period on attack Sione Kivalu dived over from dummy half to give the visitors a 10-0 lead nearing halftime. Tommy Beale finished off a back movement to the right in the corner with Navajo Doyle's conversion making it 10-6 to Papakura at half time. Vasuvulagi powered over ten minutes into the second half to level the scores before Doyle's conversion gave the Lions the lead for the first time. Soon after the home side attacked from their own 20 metre line with Kahu Capper finishing the movement off in the right corner. Minites later a handling error by Papakura prop Stedman Lafau saw Mt Albert pick up the ball and Kalepo Paualaisa raced 15 metres to put the Lions 22-10 in front. Papakura then came back with a try to Talitimu Salima-Satuia who was put into a hole near the line by hooker Sione Kivalu, and then Campbell went over for his second after chasing a kick and then eluding the defenders near the line with speed and footwork. Lorenzo Filimaua's conversion tied the scores 22-22 with ten minutes remaining before Vasuvulagi crashed through for his second to see Mt Albert climb from 7th to 5th in the standings. Manukau and Pt Chevalier drew 12-12 at Moyle Park in a tight contest. The only points in the first half came when Desmon To'ofohe ran left from dummy half and crashed over with Leti Muller converting. Pt Chevalier scored their first try in the 43rd minute when Khalan Clyde went over from dummy half in similar fashion but Jeriah Vagana missed the conversion. Mark Sikuvea slipped through some weak tackling to give the Pirates an 8-6 lead in the 53rd minute. Kahn Munokoa then leapt to take a Leti Muller kick on the try line to cross to put the Magpies back ahead 12-8 following the conversion from Muller. Sikuvea's second levelled the scores at 12-12 after he dove on a Matagi-Blade Collins Kamuhemu grubber kick. Crucially Pt Chevalier missed their third conversion using three different kickers, this time Sikuvea missed the chance to convert his own try and neither team could find any more points. The first placed Otahuhu easily beat the last placed Marist 78-4 at Bert Henham Park. Otahuhu led 38-0 with the only points coming to Marist through a try by Sagele Palaamo in the 48th minute. For Otahuhu, Arthur Crichton and Toaiti Ramsay scored doubles, while Tevita Mikaele crossed three times to bring his season tally to seven. Ramsay now extended his lead over Kahn Munokoa as the leading try scorer with 13 from 10 games. James Dowie converted 11 of their 14 tries and added a try of his own for 26 personal points taking his season tally to 84.

27 June	Bay Roskill	26-34 (10-10)	Ponsonby	Blockhouse Bay Reserve 4, Blockhouse Bay
2:30	Try: Josh Tanielu 2 (2m, 42m), Nixon Leaso 2 (11m, 46m), Zion Tanielu-Seiuli (60m); Con: Josh Tanielu 1/1 (12m), Carlos Davis 2/4 (47m, 61m)		Try: Saula Solomona (20m), Dylan Tavita (33m), Andre Kahui-Singh 2 (52m, 76m), Delano Atai (68m), Victor Kenese (72m); Con: Dylan Tavita 5/6 (35m, 53m, 70m, 72m, 78m)	Referee: Brent Newton, TJ's: Warren Clarke and Paul Lorigan

27 June	Mt Albert	26-22 (6-10)	Papakura	Fowlds Park 1, Morningside
2:30	Try: Tommy Beale (35m), Solomon Vasuvulagi 2 (50m, 76m), Kahu Capper (55m), Kalepo Paualaisa (59m); Con: Navajo Doyle 3/5 (36m, 51m, 64m)		Try: Luke Campbell 2 (19m, 68m), Sione Kivalu (28m), Talitimu Salima-Satuia (65m); Con: Lorenzo Filimaua 3/4 (20m, 66m, 69m)	Referee: Paki Parkinson, TJ's: James Priest and Leigh Fletcher

27 June	Manukau	12-12 (6-0)	Pt Chevalier	Moyle Park 1, Māngere
2:30	Try: Desmond To'ofohe (28m), Kahn Munokoa (56m); Con: Leti Muller 2/2 (28m, 58m)		Try: Khalan Clyde (43m), Mark Sikuvea (53m, 65m); Con: Jeriah Vagana 0/1, Parekaahu Keepa 0/1, Mark Sikuvea 0/1	Referee: David Millar, TJ's: Tameilau Pauuvale

27 June	Otahuhu	78-4 (38-0)	Marist	Bert Henham Park 1, Ōtāhuhu
2:30	Try: Jamel Hunt (1m), Arthur Crichton 2 (5m, 76m), Toaiti Ramsay 2 (9m, 33m), William Fakatoumafi (19m), Tevita Mikaele 3 (21m, 43m, 64m), James Dowie (24m), Sione Tesese (57m), Connor Taurua-Purcell (60m), Anthony Naitoko (68m), Bostyn Hakaraia (73m); Con: James Dowie 11/14 (3m, 6m, 20m, 23m, 35m, 57m, 61m, 66m, 70m, 74m, 77m)		Try: Sagele Palaamo (48m); Con: Tama-Teahorangi Darlington 0/1	Referee: Daniel Caddy, TJ's: Curtis Wharewaka and Saane Mosaati

===== Round 11 =====
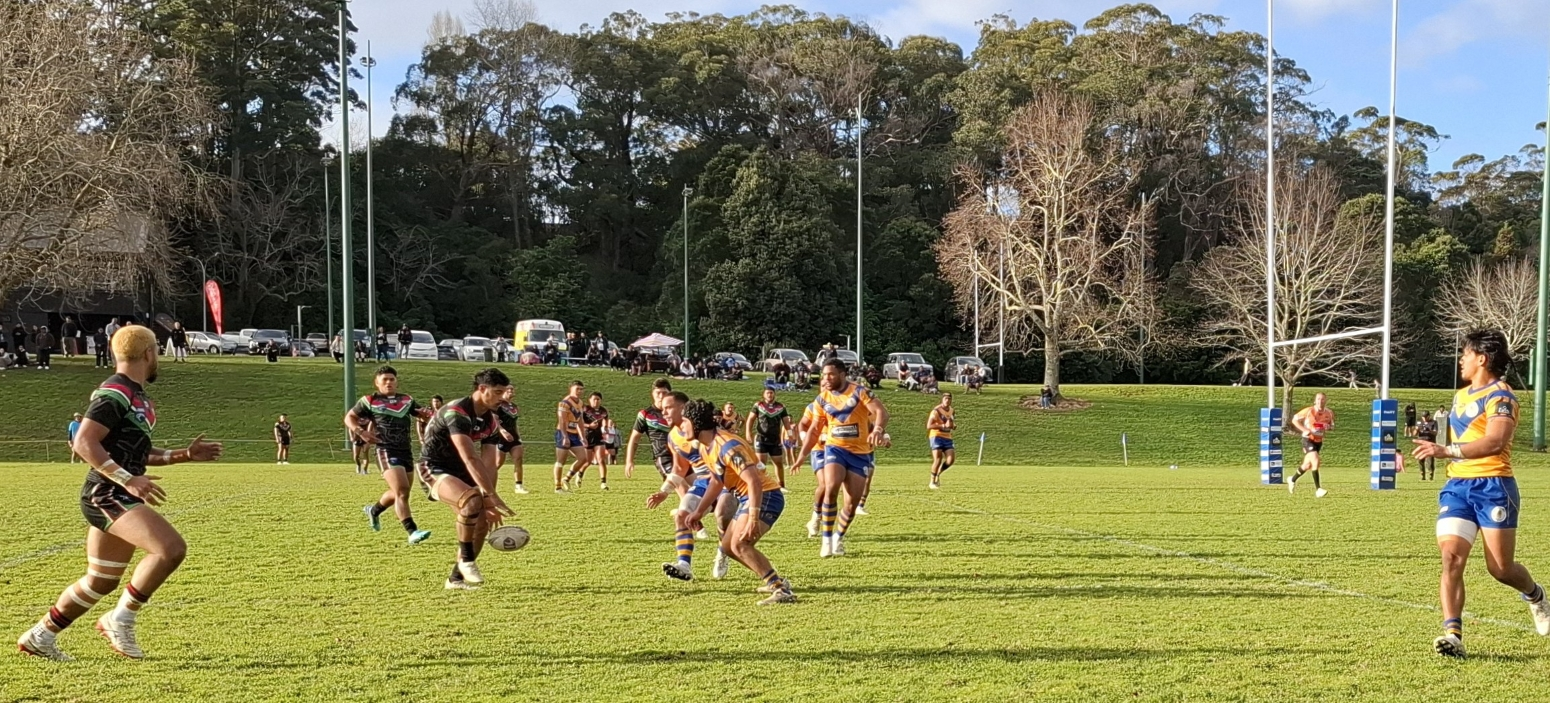
Josh Tanielu attempts an attacking kick for Bay Roskill.

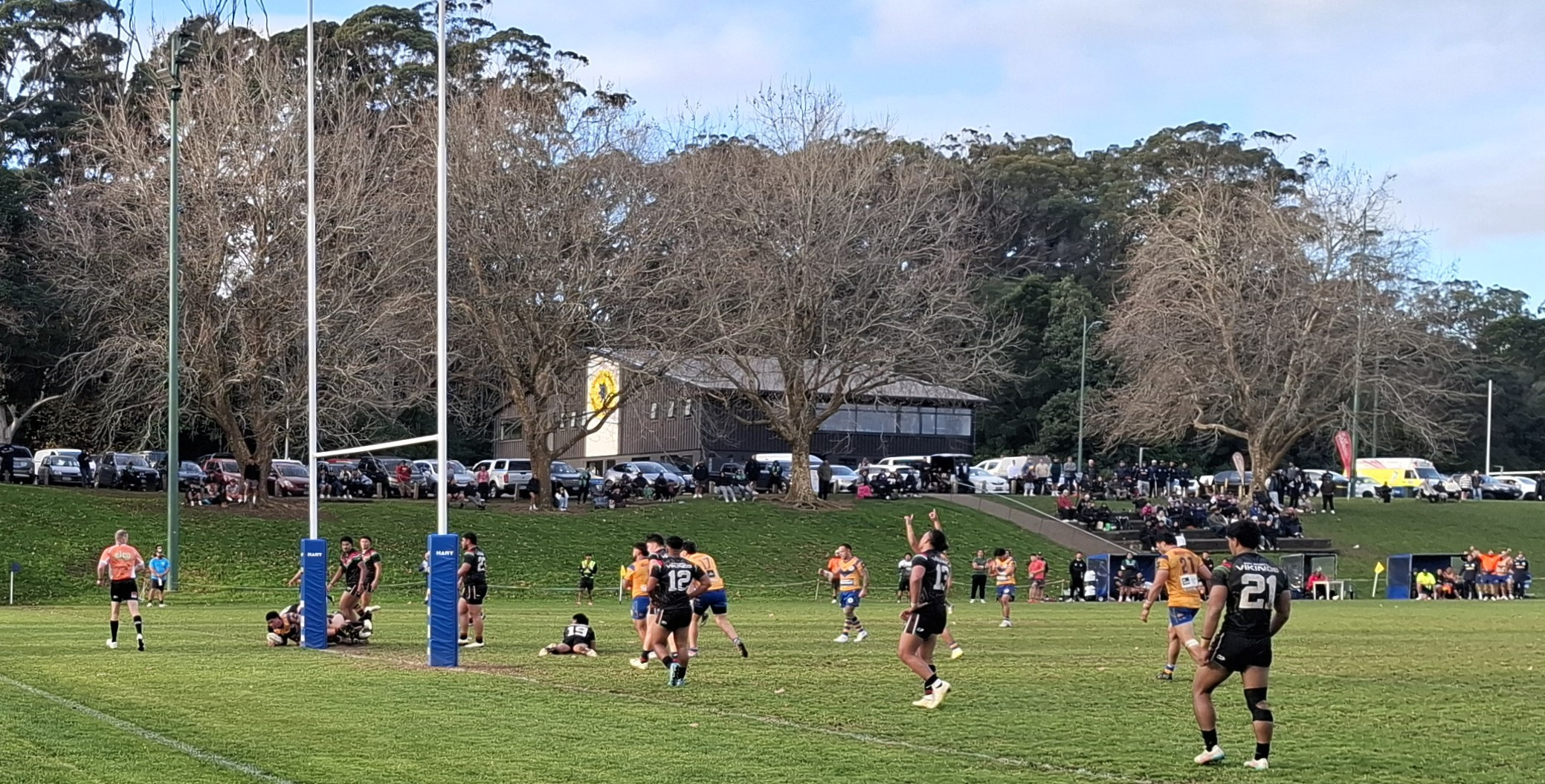

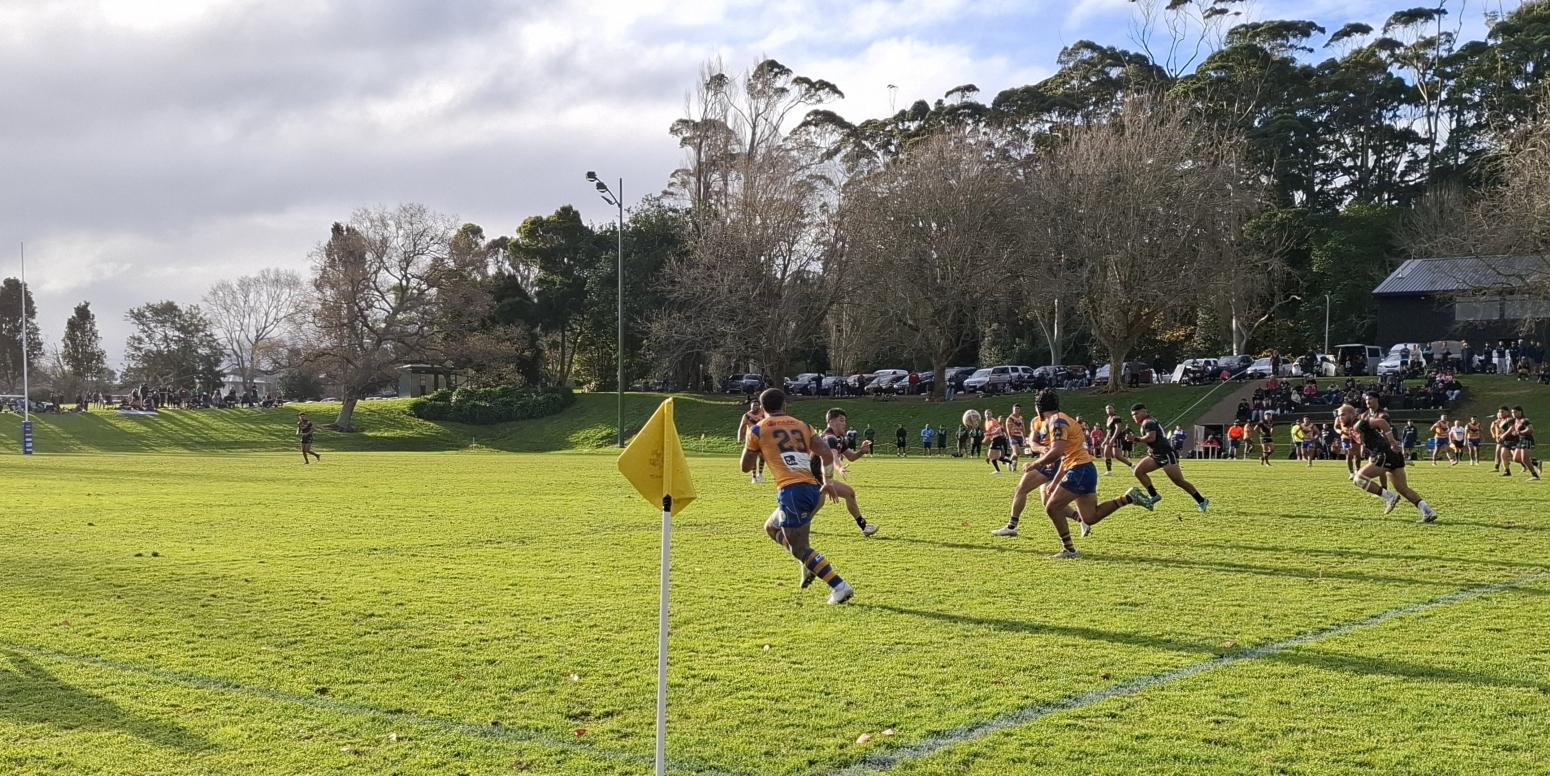
Kalepo Paualaisa links with Geronimo Doyle for Mount Albert in the second half.

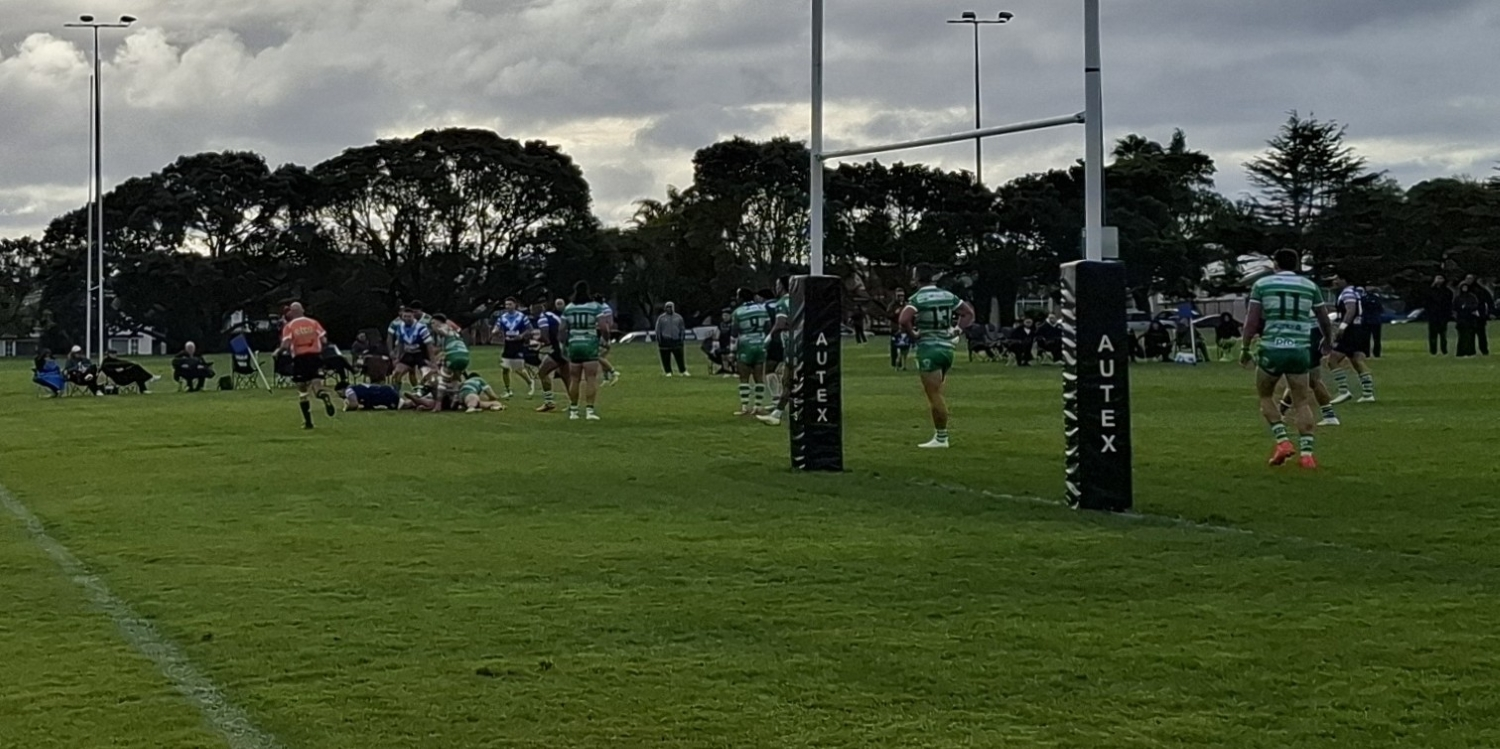
Phoenix Hunt putting Otahuhu ahead 8-0 after he dove after from dummy half.

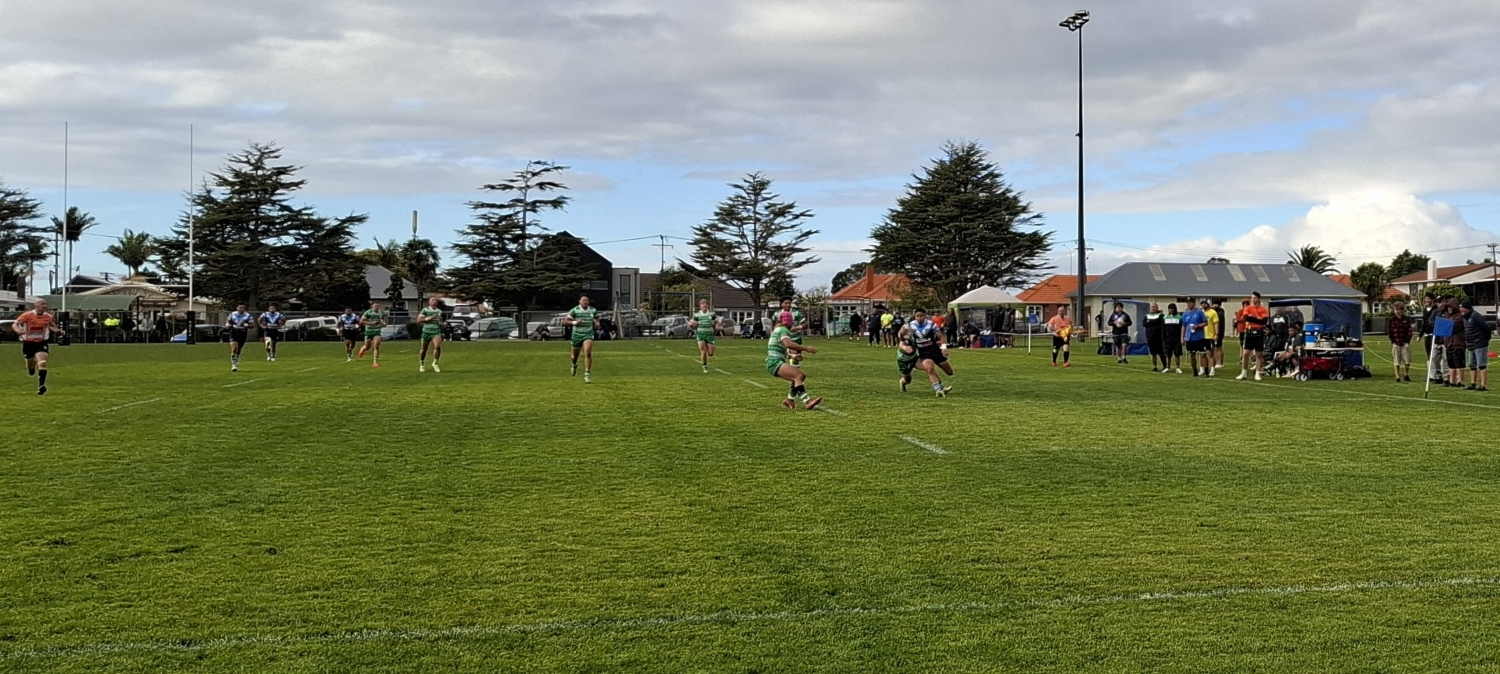
Antony Naitoko making a break for Otahuhu.

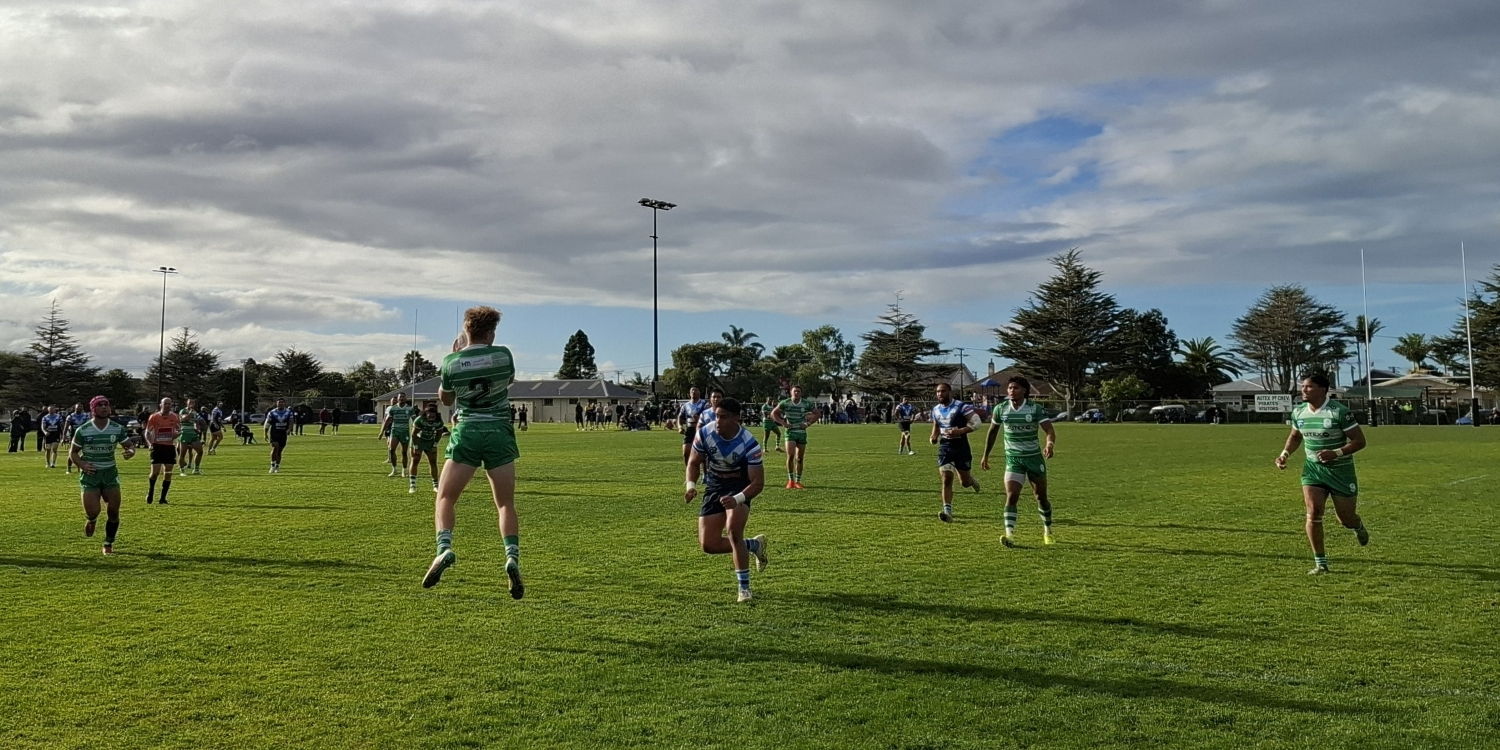
Lucas Carmine taking a bomb in goal for Point Chevalier.

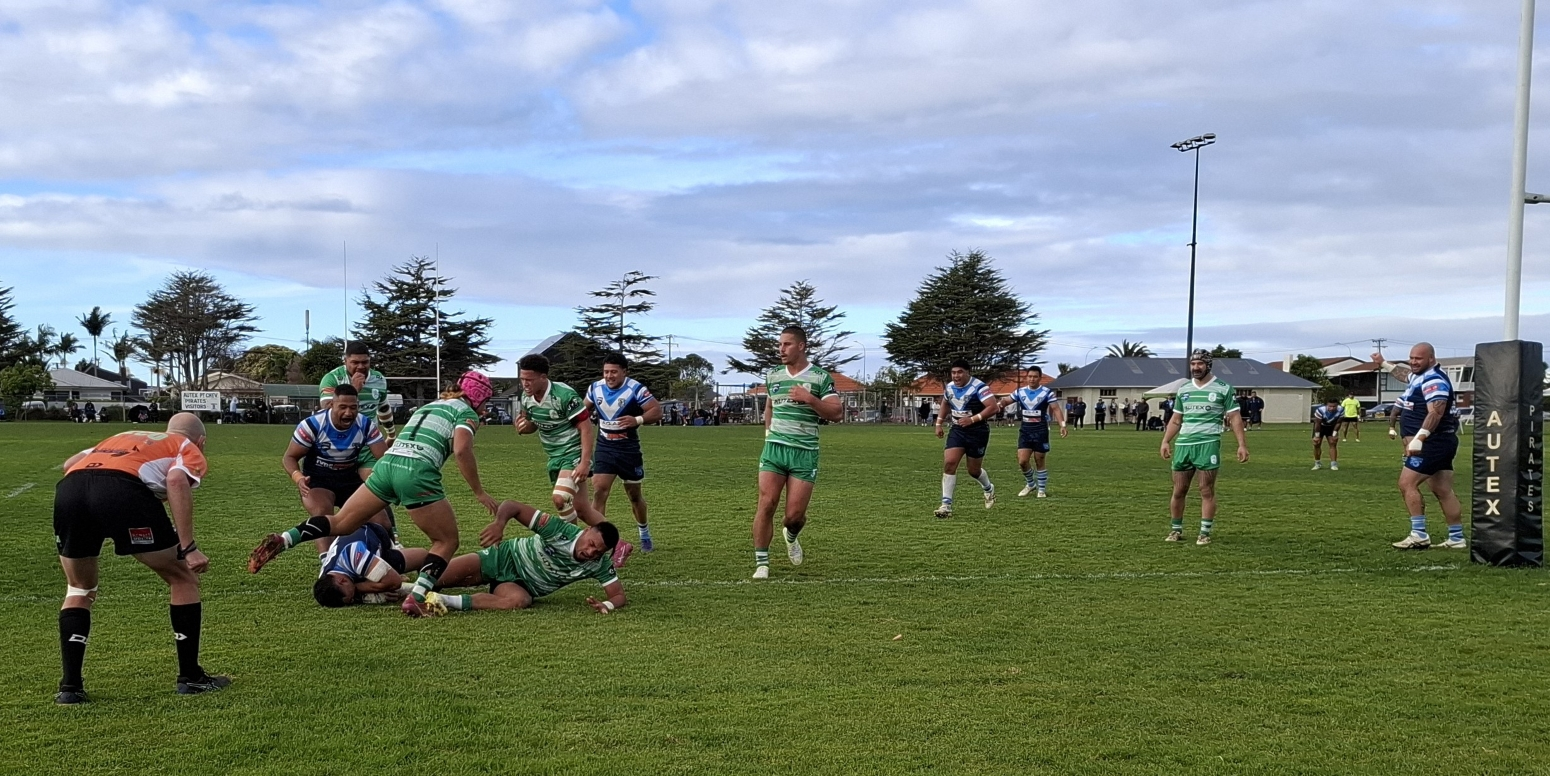
Arthur Crichton powers his way over for Otahuhu.

4 July	Mt Albert	18-6 (12-6)	Bay Roskill	Fowlds Park 1, Morningside
2:30	Try: Ezekial Davidson-Faaiuso (4m), Kalepo Paualaisa (37m), Paaua Papanui-Abbott (71m); Con: Navajo Doyle 3/3 (6m, 39m, 73m)		Try: Tua Falelua (20m); Con: Carlos Davis 1/1 (22m)	Attendance: 350; Referee: Anthony Eliott, TJ's: Warren Clarke and Leigh Fletcher

4 July	Ponsonby	6-40 (6-10)	Manukau	Victoria Park 1, Auckland Central
2:30	Try: Sitiveni Aipolo (3m); Con: Dylan Tavita 1/1 (4m)		Try: George Tuihalangi (13m), Kaes Daniels Strickland (36m), Viliami Kuli 2 (48m, 78m), Kuros Metuariki (63m), Paea Folau (73m), Paea Fotu (77m); Con: Leti Muller 6/7 (16m, 50m, 64m, 74m, 77m, 80m)	Referee: Paki Parkinson, TJ's: Simon Bailey and Jack Feavers

4 July	Pt Chevalier	6-30 (0-14)	Otahuhu	Walker Park 2, Point Chevalier
2:30	Try: Patrick Sipley (51m); Con: Noah Jensen 1/1 (53m)		Try: Antony Naitoko (3m), Phoenix Hunt (8m), Arthur Crichton (33m), Bostyn Hakaraia (44m), William Fakatoumafi (71m), James Dowie (80m); Con: William Fakatoumafi 2/4 (34m, 45m), James Dowie 1/1 (72m), Fine Vakatakakala 0/1	Attendance: 350; Referee: David Millar, TJ's: Maxine Godinet and Paul Lorigan

4 July	Papakura	36-14 (30-0)	Marist	Prince Edward Park 1, Papakura
2:30	Try: Talitua Salima-Satuia 2 (4m, 14m), James Masina Tuivai-Lopa (26m), Fuamaila Gatapu (31m), Stedman Lefau (36m), Siave Togoiu (76m); Con: Lorenzo Filimaua 6/6 (5m, 16m, 28m, 32m, 37m, 77m)		Try: Makea Amosa-Tiro (42m), Holyfield Kapsin (45m), Takaia Williams (69m); Con: Tama-Teahorangi Darlington 0/1, Aria Cerei 1/2 (46m)	Referee: Daniel Caddy, TJ's: Tammeilau Pauuvale and Michael Une

===== Round 12 =====
11 July	Otahuhu	38-10 (20-6)	Bay Roskill	Bert Henham Park, Ōtāhuhu
2:30	Try: Bostyn Hakaraia (8m), Jeremiah Poutu (16m), Phoenix Hunt (24m), James Dowie (33m), Tevita Mikaele (44m), Patolo Taito (75m), Arthur Crichton (78m); Con: William Fakatoumafi 5/7 (9m, 25m, 45m, 76m, 79m)		Try: Joshua Tanielu (38m), Masyn Paul (72m); Con: Joshua Tanielu (40m)	Referee: Keven Ah-Ken

11 July	Manukau	32-20 (12-10)	Mt Albert	Moyle Park, Māngere
2:30	Try: Aisake Tauatina (18m), Yijo John (30m), Paea Fotu (49m), Clive Tu'ifua (55m), Kahn Munokoa (68m), Paea Folau (78m); Con: Leti Muller 4/6 (20m, 32m, 59m, 79m)		Try: Ezekial Davidson Faaiuaso (11m), Solomon Vasuvulagi (36m), John Aitu (65m), Isaiah Fale (66m); Con: Navajo Doyle 2/4 (37m, 65m)	Referee: Paki Parkinson

11 July	Papakura	38-14 (16-14)	Ponsonby
2:30	Try: Royden Tupaea (1m), Siave Togoiu 2 (25m, 80m), Luke Campbell (27m), Tamehana Paruru (46m), Joseph Price (53m), Fuamaila Gatapu (78m); Con: Lorenzo Filimaua 5/8 (3m, 26m, 55m, 79m, 80m)		Try: James Taumata (16m), Zinzan Cooper-Fuimaono (20m), Epalahame Tafea (39m); Con: Dylan Tavita 1/3 (40m)	Referee: Daniel Caddy

11 July	Marist	4-28 (0-8)	Pt Chevalier	Murray Halberg Park, Owairaka
2:30	Try: Makea Amosa-Tiro (63m); Con: Tama-Teahorangi 0/1		Try: Ngana Vake (19m), Parekaahu Keepa 2 (27m, 67m), Mark Anthony Sikuvea (44m), Sefanaia Cowley-Lupo (50m), Khalan Clyde (72m); Con: Noah Jensen 0/2, Sefanaia Cowley-Lupo 1/3 (69m), Jeriah Vagana 1/1 (72m)	Referee: Eisley Brown

===== Round 13 =====
Timor Williams brought up his 100th game for Ponsonby in their loss to Mt Albert.

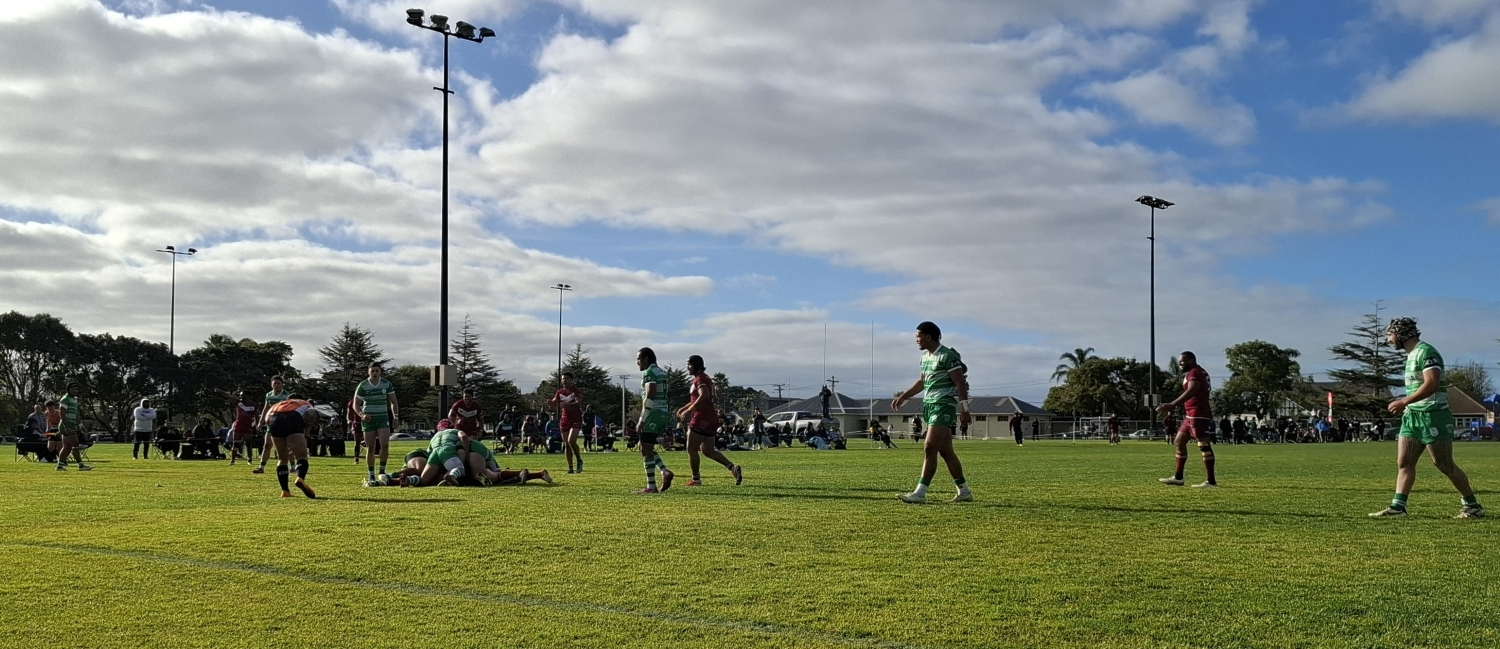
Luke Campbell scores for Papakura after throwing a dummy from dummy half and diving through the defenders.

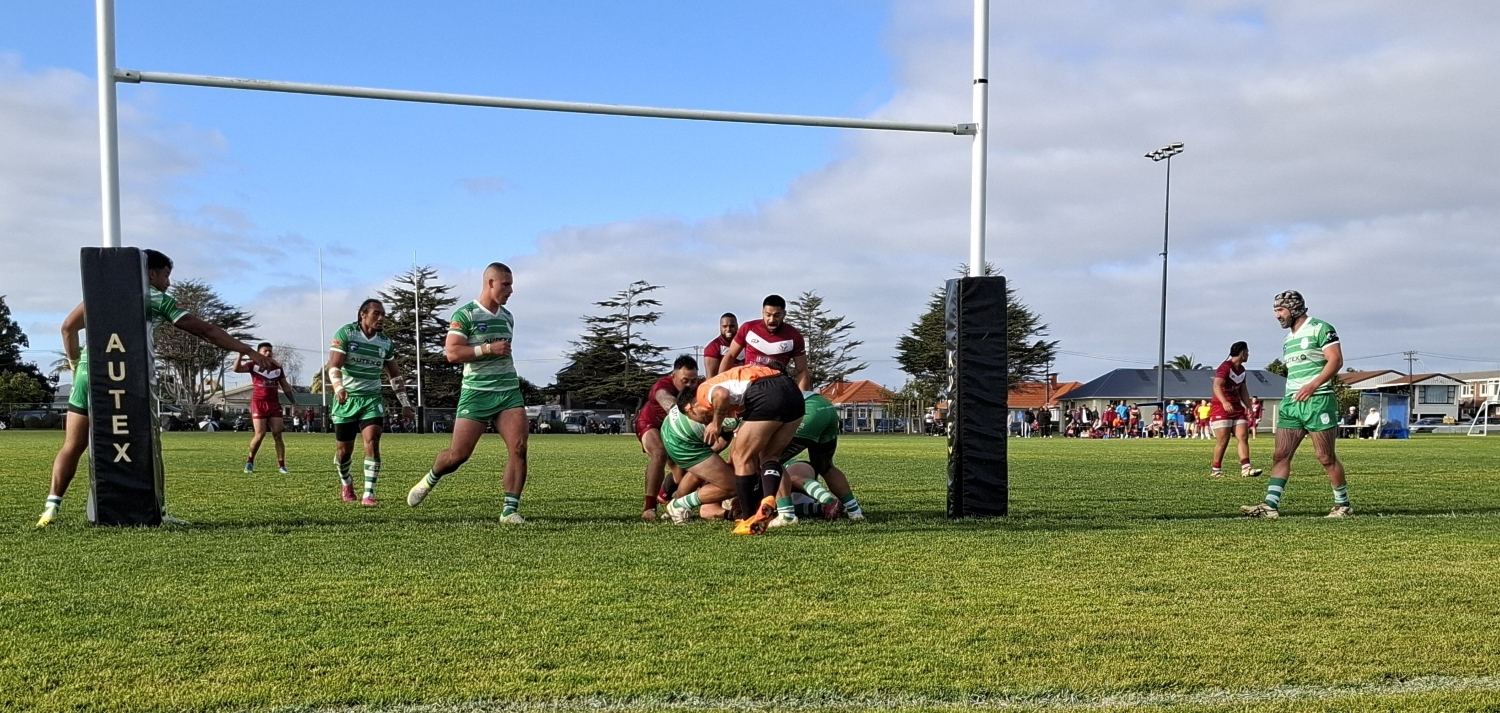
Campbell scores again after pushing through defenders and managing to plant the ball on the line.

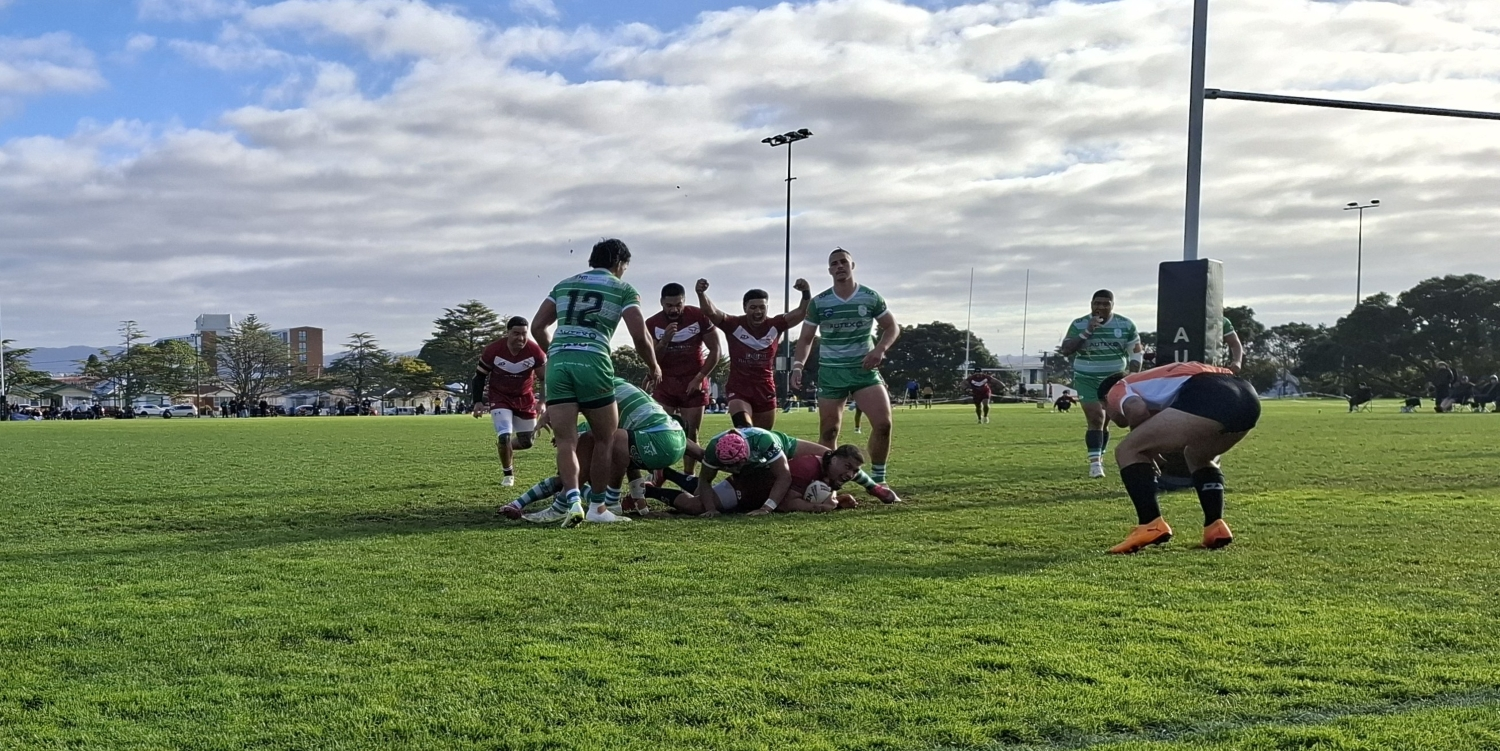
Terrell Sala putting Papakura ahead 20-14 in the second half.

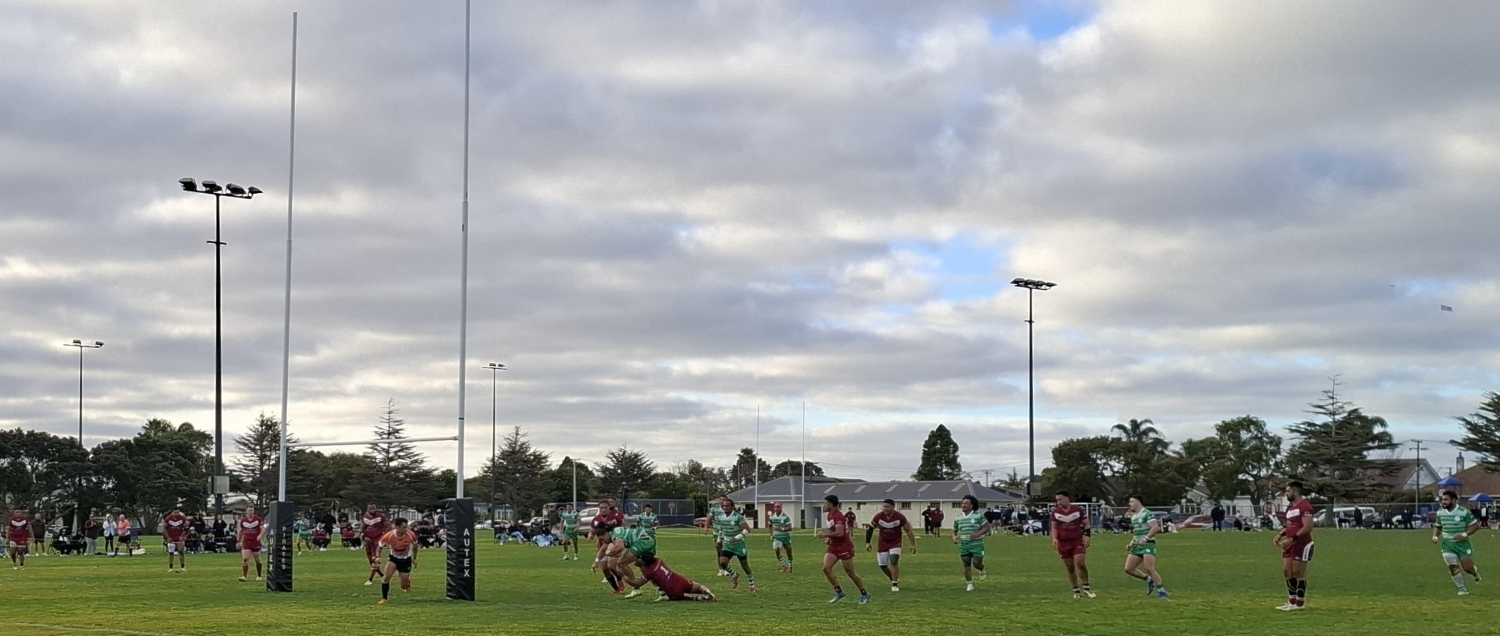
Patrick Sipley crashes through the defence to seal Point Chevalier's comeback win a minute from full time.

18 July	Bay Roskill	38-16 (22-10)	Marist	Blockhouse Bay Reserve 4, Blockhouse Bay
2:30	Try: Vincent Tupu (3m), Ezra Vogel (23m), Zion Tanielu 2 (27m, 71m), AJ Tauafao-Fa'alogo (31m), Nixon Leaso 2 (74m, 79m); Con: Joshua Tanielu 5/7 (5m, 24m, 27m, 72m, 75m)		Try: Montell Matamu Tuese (9m), Caleb Laiman (18m), Sunia Akau'ola (58m); Con: Aria Cerei 2/3 (20m, 59m)	Referee: Keven Ah-Ken, TJ's: Simon Bailey & Curtis Wharewaka

18 July	Ponsonby	24-30 (14-20)	Mt Albert	Victoria Park, Auckland Central
2:30	Try: Li Taufoou (11m), Andre Kahui-Singh (32m), Soane Hufunga (40m), Levi Helleur-Atiga (48m), Timor Williams (79m); Con: Andre Kahui-Singh 0/1, Dylan Tavita 2/4 (40m, 80m)		Try: Cassius Tia (15m), Kahu Capper (19m), John Aitu (24m), Juelz Baker (33m), Kalepo Paualaisa (53m), Ezekiel Davidson-Faaiuaso (65m); Con: Navajo Doyle 3/6 (26m, 34m, 66m)	Attendance: 250; Referee: David Millar, TJ's: Leigh Fletcher & Oliver Broadhead

18 July	Manukau	10-32 (0-10)	Otahuhu	Moyle Park 1, Māngere
2:30	Try: Viliami Kuli (61m), Desmond To'ofohe (68m); Con: Paea Fotu 1/2 (69m)		Try: Albert Vete (11m), James Dowie (38m), Connor Taurua-Purcell (53m), Tevita Mikaele (72m), Phoenix Hunt (78m), William Fakatoumafi (80m); Con: William Fakatoumafi 4/6 (12m, 55m, 79m, 80m)	Attendance: 350; Referee: Anthony Eliott, TJ's: Tameilau Pauuvale & Michael Une

18 July	Pt Chevalier	30-22 (6-16)	Papakura	Walker Park 2, Pt Chevalier
2:30	Try: Mark Sikuvea 2 (11m, 64m), Lani Graham-Taufa (43m), Taipari Wikitera (46m), Sione Ngahe (59m), Patrick Sipley (80m); Con: Blade Collins-Kamuhemu 3/6 (12m, 61m, 80m)		Try: Roydon Tupaea (5m), Luke Campbell 2 (23m, 34m), Terrell Sala (52m); Con: Lorenzo Filimaua 3/4 (24m, 36m, 54m)	Attendance: 250; Referee: Eisley Brown, TJ's: Warren Clarke & Liam Clayton

===== Round 14 =====
Marcus Fraser became the first player in Mt Albert history to play 200 games when they met Marist.

25 July	Manukau	20-20 (10-10)	Bay Roskill	Moyle Park, Māngere
2:30	Try: Yijo John (4m), Kaes Daniels Strickland (30m), Toporo Purotu (63m), Kahn Munokoa (73m); Con: Viliami Kuli 1/2 (5m), Paea Fotu 1/2 (65m)		Try: Vinny Vogel (15m), Justus Leaoseve (24m), AJ Tauafao-Fa'alogo (58m), Josh Tanielu (80m); Con: Josh Tanielu 1/4 (25m); Pen: Josh Tanielu 1/1 (53m)	Attendance: 150; Referee: Keven Ah-Ken, TJ's: Tameilau Pauuvale & Michael Une

25 July	Mt Albert	42-18 (22-6)	Marist	Fowlds Park 1, Morningside
2:30	Try: Kalepo Paualaisa 3 (1m, 53m, 65m), Api Pewhairangi (5m), Ezekial Davidson-Faaiuso 2 (26m, 74m), Valentino Yandall (30m), Phoenix Sorensen (36m), Navajo Doyle (69m); Con: Navajo Doyle 3/6 (6m, 66m, 70m), Thompson Karena 0/1, Cassius Tia 0/1, Api Pewhairangi 0/1		Try: Sunia Akau'ola (14m), Lyric Matamu (46m), Lucas Viliamu (50m); Con: Aria Cerei 3/3 (16m, 48m, 52m)	Attendance: 150; Referee: Daniel Caddy, TJ's: Warren Clarke & Dayton Ryan

25 July	Otahuhu	44-14 (20-10)	Papakura	Bert Henham Park 1, Ōtāhuhu
2:30	Try: Fine Vakautakakala 3 (2m, 10m, 61m), Antony Naitoko (18m), Phoenix Hunt (22m), William Fakatoumafi (47m), Siona Tesese (52m), Viliami Tahitua (80m); Con: William Fakatoumafi 5/7 (3m, 12m, 48m, 53m, 61m), Jamel Hunt 1/1 (80m)		Try: Isileli Matalave (25m), Fuamaila Gatapu (32m), Chris Masina Tuivai-Lopa (58m); Con: Lorenzo Filimaua 1/3 (26m)	Attendance: 150; Referee: Anthony Eliott, TJ's: James Priest & Corey Jull

25 July	Pt Chevalier	44-0 (12-0)	Ponsonby	Walker Park, Pt Chevalier
2:30	Try: Mikaele Ilaiu (16m), Parekaahu Keepa 2 (29m, 66m), Lani Graham-Taufa (43m), Jeriah Vagana 2 (60m, 80m), Taipari Wikitera (64m), Maxwell Wichman (72m); Con: Blade Collins-Kamuhemu 5/5 (17m, 29m, 45m, 62m, 74m), Noah Jensen 1/2 (65m), Sione Ngahe 0/1			Attendance: 150; Referee: Paki Parkinson, TJ's: Casey Gribble & Leigh Fletcher

===== Playoffs =====
====== Major Semi Final ======
1 August	Otahuhu	54-12 (30-0)	Manukau	Bert Henham Park 1, Ōtāhuhu
2:30	Try: Bostyn Hakaraia 2 (3m, 48m), Phoenix Hunt 2 (7m, 19m), Tevita Mikaele 2 (15m, 79m), Connor Taurua-Purcell 2 (39m, 66m), William Fakatoumafi (52m); Con: William Fakatoumafi 9/9 (4m, 8m, 17m, 20m, 40m, 49m, 53m, 67m, 80m)		Try: Paea Fotu (58m), Kahn Munokoa (69m, 74m); Con: Paea Fotu 0/3	Attendance: 300; Referee: Anthony Eliott, TJ's: Keven Ah-Ken and Poriau Uamaki

====== Minor Semi Final ======
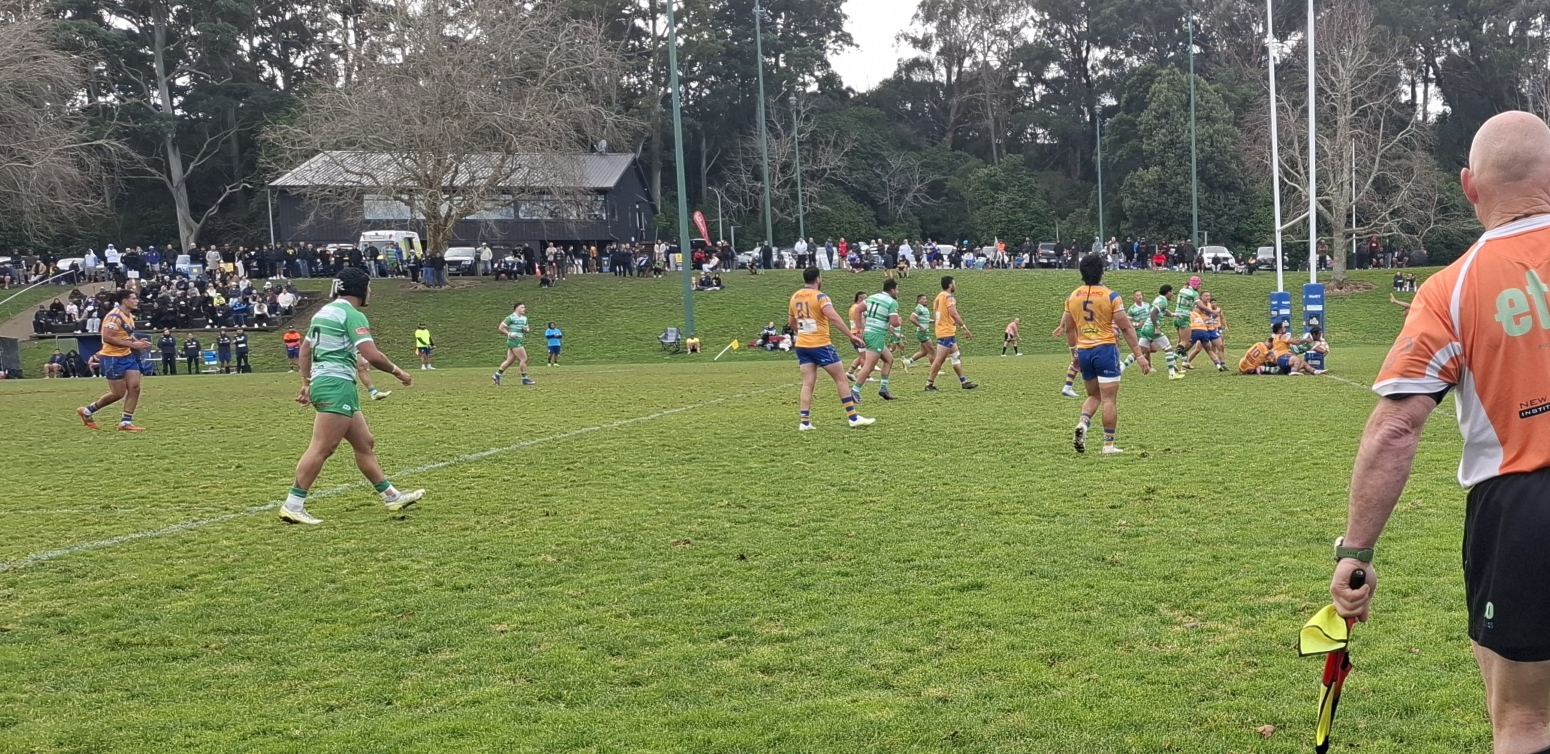
Blade Collins-Kamuhemu scoring the opening try for Point Chevalier.

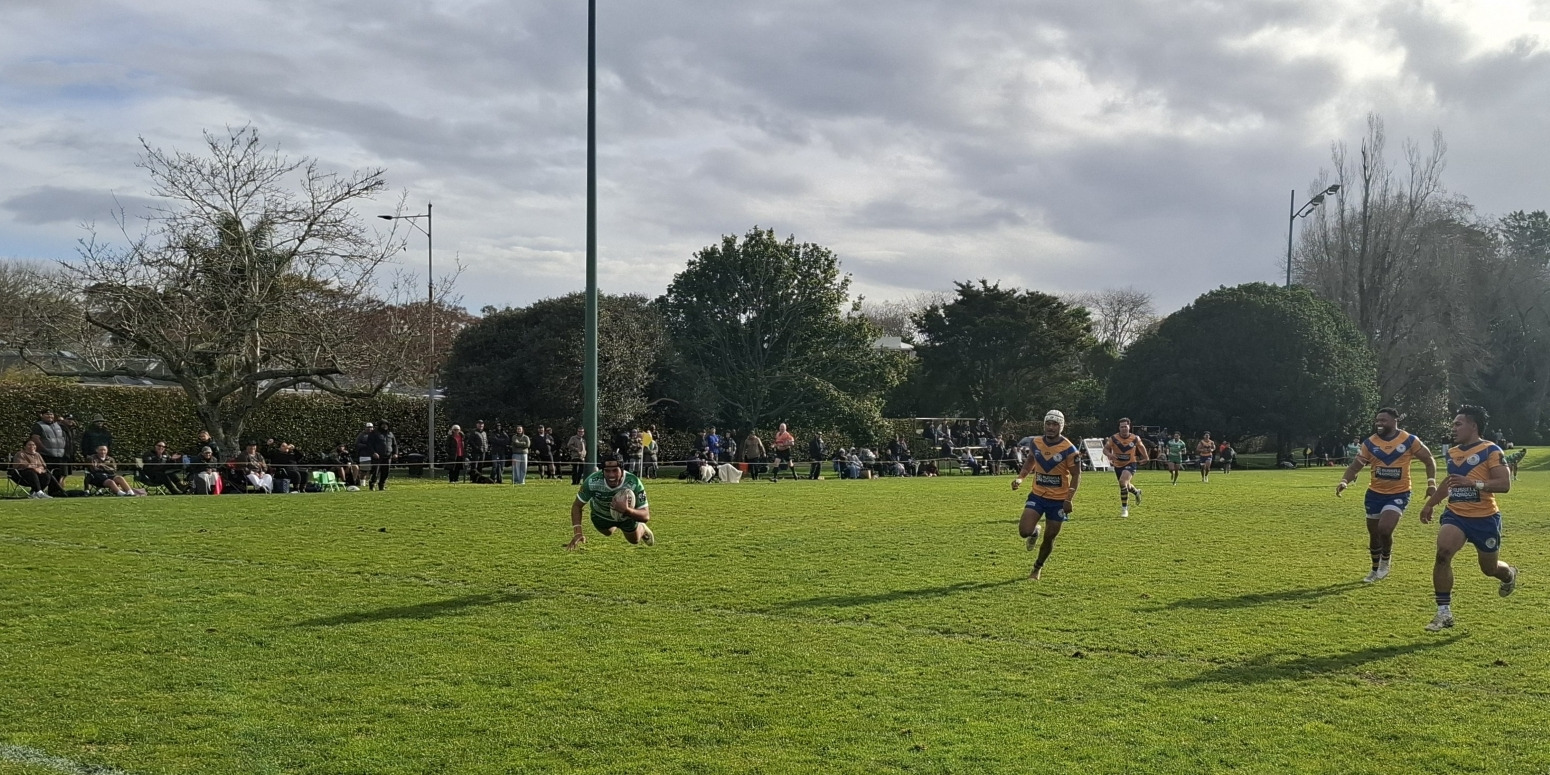
Jeriah Vagana scoring after intercepting a pass and running 60 metres.

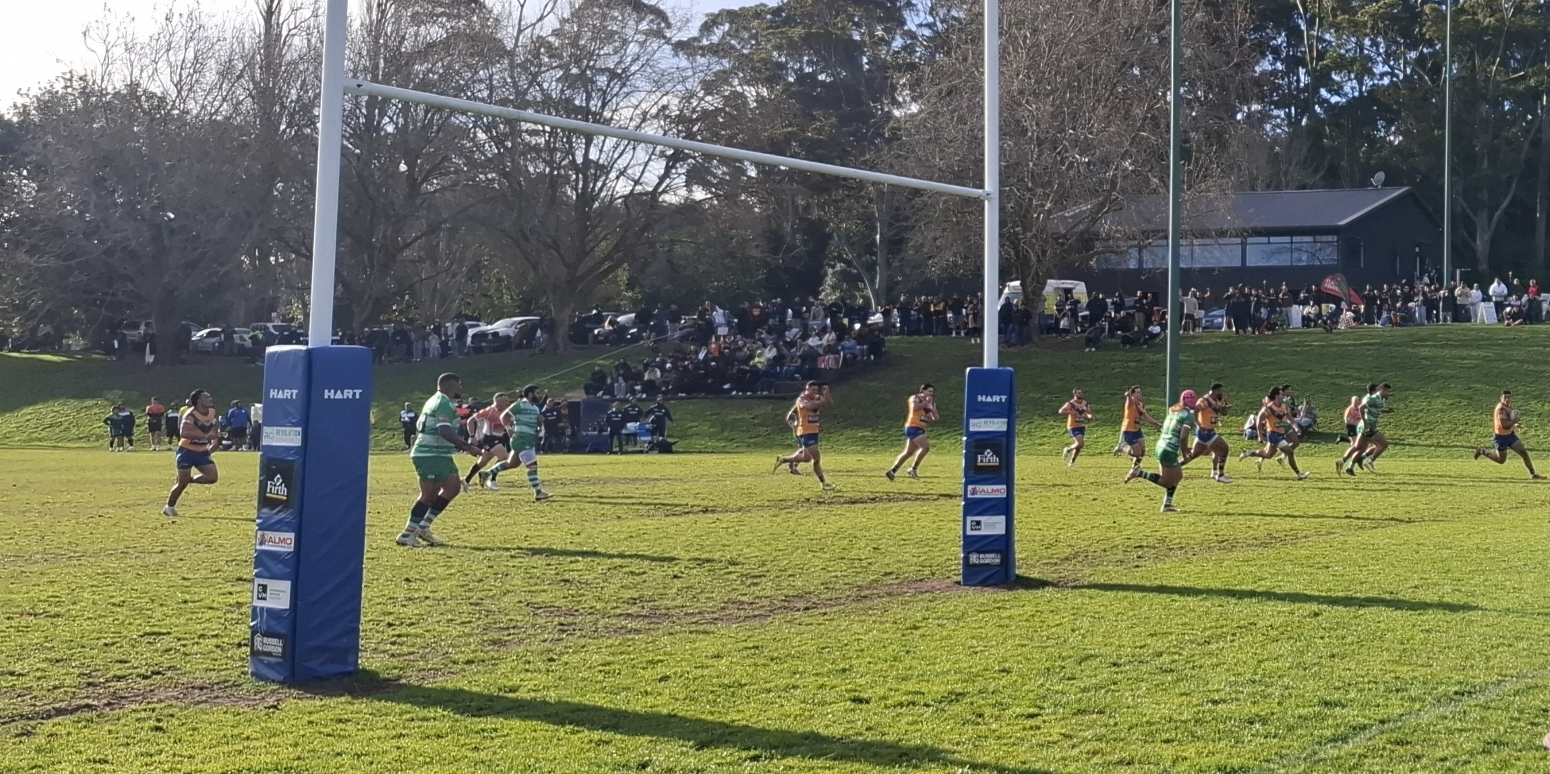
Phoenix Sorensen scoring straight from the kickoff after Pt Chevalier allowed the ball to bounce to narrow the score to 10-12.

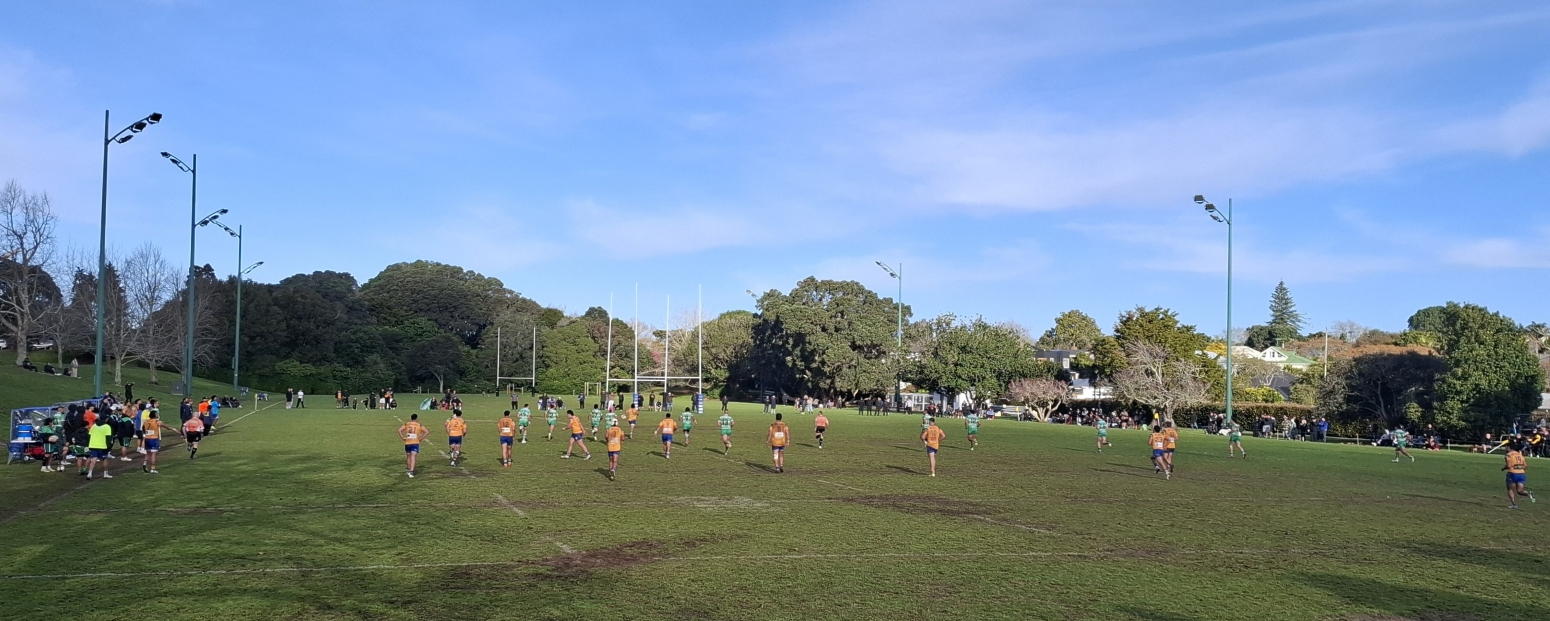
Kalepo Paualaisa running 65 metres to score after taking a pass from Navajo Doyle to give Mt Albert a 20-18 lead.

Mt Albert overcame Pt Chevalier following a strong second half. Pt Chevalier opened the scoring when Blade Collins-Kamuhemu used his strength to go over in a tackle next to the posts, before Mt Albert crossed twice with tries to backs John Aitu and Juelz Baker, both converted by hooker Navajo Doyle. Mt Albert were attacking in Pt Chevalier's half when Thompson Karena's pass was intercepted by Jeriah Vagana and run 60 metres to level the scores at 12-12 which they remained until half time. Two minutes into the second half Lani Graham-Taufa was sin binned for a high tackle on Phoenix Sorensen while he was defending his try line, and then Kahu Capper was also sin binned for abusing the referee, Paki Parkinson in the 46th minute. Ten minutes into the second half big second rower Daniel Sausau broke out of six tackle attempts to crash over and Noah Jensen's third conversion put them 18-12 ahead. The final 28 minutes was marked however by Pt Chevaliers errors from kicks. Two minutes after Sausau's try the kickoff was allowed to bounce straight into the hands of Phoenix Sorensen who ran in untouched for a try. Then in the 64th minute an attacking bomb was dropped by Lani Graham-Taufa and bounced into the hands of Navajo Doyle who passed to Kalepo Paualaisa with an open field ahead of him. He ran 65 metres to score under the posts handing the Lions a 22-18 lead after Doyle's conversion. Just four minutes later Mt Albert put up a bomb and Pt Chevalier winger Mark Sikuvea dropped it with it toed ahead by Mt Albert. In the chase Parekaahu Keepa was unable to gather the ball on his try line and Cassius Tia following up grounded the ball on the line for a try. With five minutes remaining Ezekial Davidson Faaiuso put the game beyond doubt when he leapt high to take a chip from Juelz Baker to ground the ball in the corner.

1 August	Mt Albert	32-18	Pt Chevalier	Fowlds Park 1, Otahuhu
2:30	Try: John Aitu (16m), Juelz Baker (28m), Phoenix Sorensen (52m), Kalepo Paualaisa (64m), Cassius Tia (68m), Ezekial Davidson Faaiuaso (75m); Con: Navajo Doyle 4/6 (17m, 29m, 66m, 69m)		Try: Blade Collins-Kamuhemu (10m), Jeriah Vagana (31m), Daniel Sausau (50m); Con: Noah Jensen 3/3 (12m, 33m, 52m)	Attendance: 400; Referee: Paki Parkinson, TJ's: James Priest and TBC

====== Major Semi Final ======
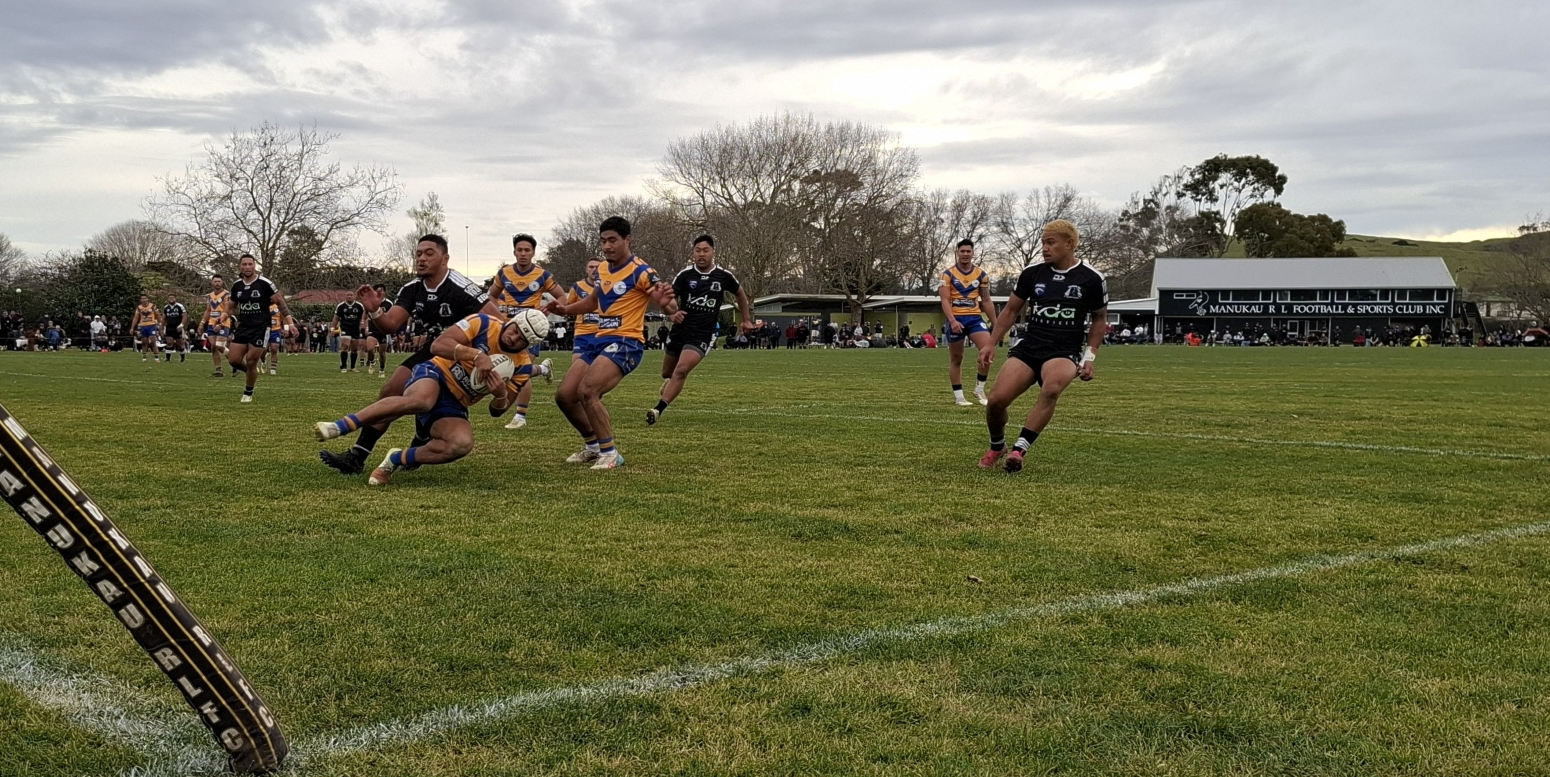
John Aitu covering up a kick for Mt Albert.

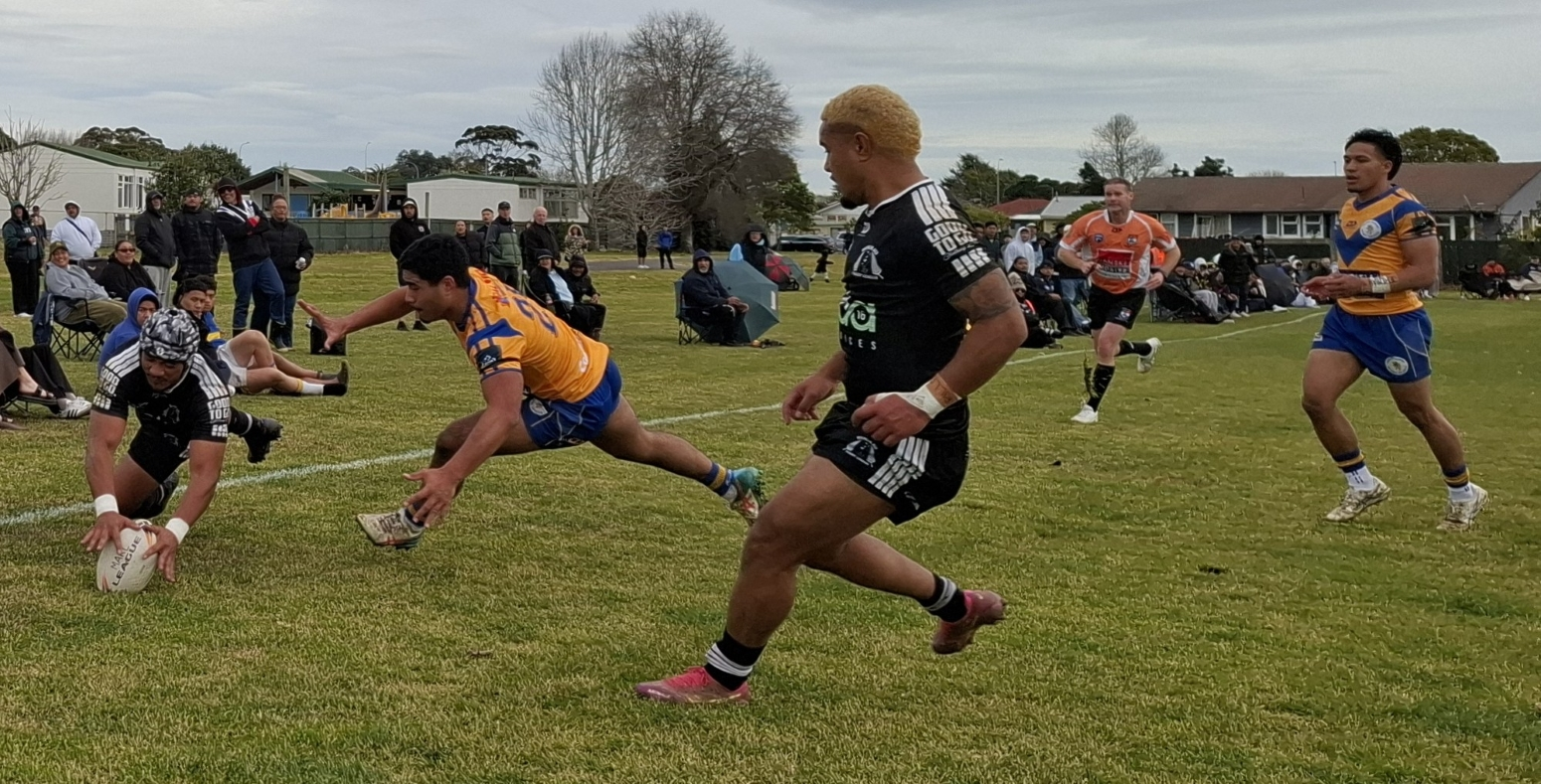
Paea Fotu scoring for Manukau after chasing a Samuel Nati grubber kick out of dummy half.

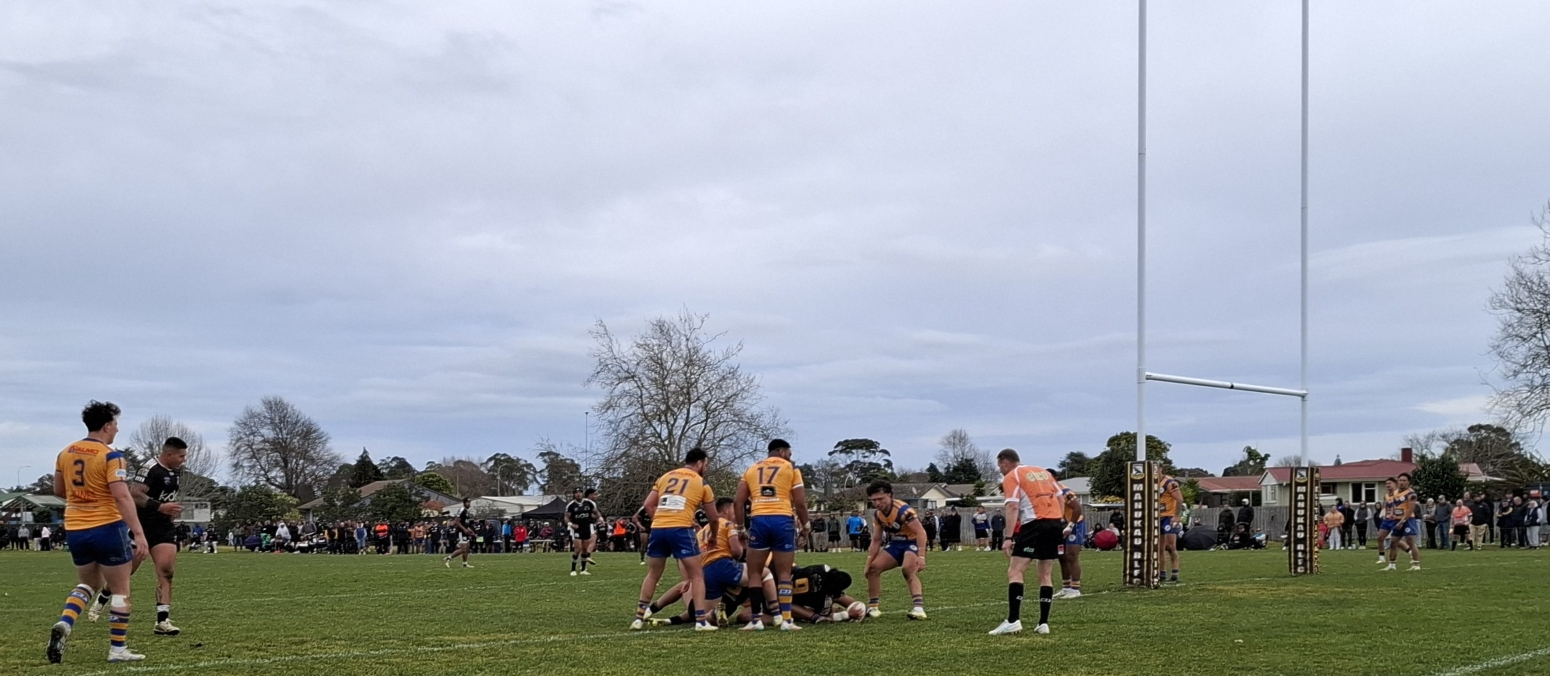
Desmond To'ofohe diving over from dummy half to score Manukau's third try.

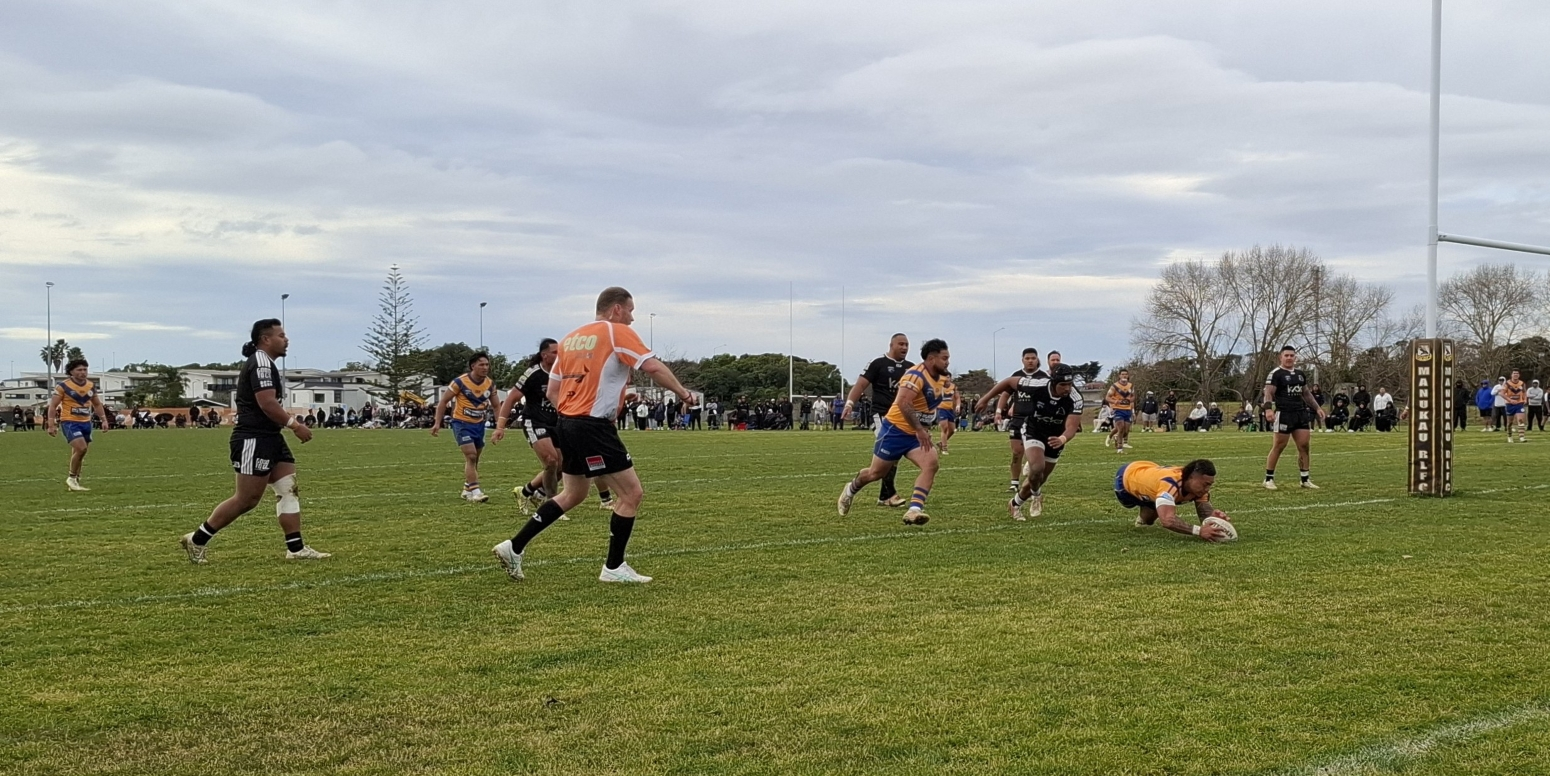
Cassius Tia diving on a loose ball following a kick from Juelz Baker to give Mt Albert a 20-12 lead.

8 August	Manukau	12-22 (8-8)	Mt Albert	Moyle Park 1, Māngere
2:30	Try: Kahn Munokoa (3m), Paea Fotu (35m), Desmond To'ofohe (57m); Con: Leti Muller 0/3		Try: Ezekial Davidson Faaiuaso (13m), Tommy Beale (24m), Juelz Baker (48m), Cassius Tia (64m); Con: Navajo Doyle 0/2, Kahu Capper 2/2 (49m, 67m); Pen: Kahu Capper 1/2 (56m)	Attendance: 450; Referee: Anthony Eliott

====== Grand Final ======
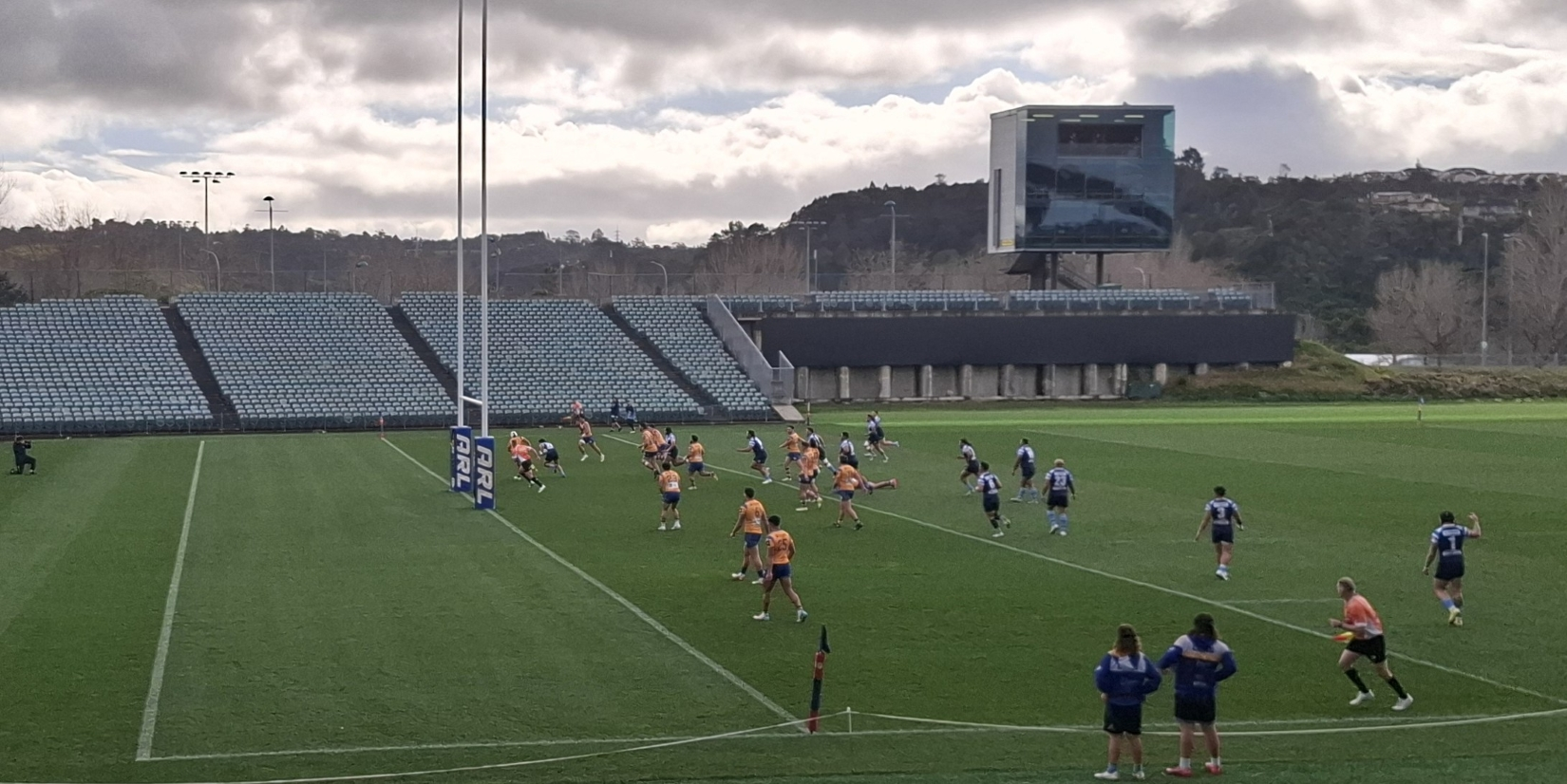
Phoenix Hunt opening the scoring for Otahuhu.

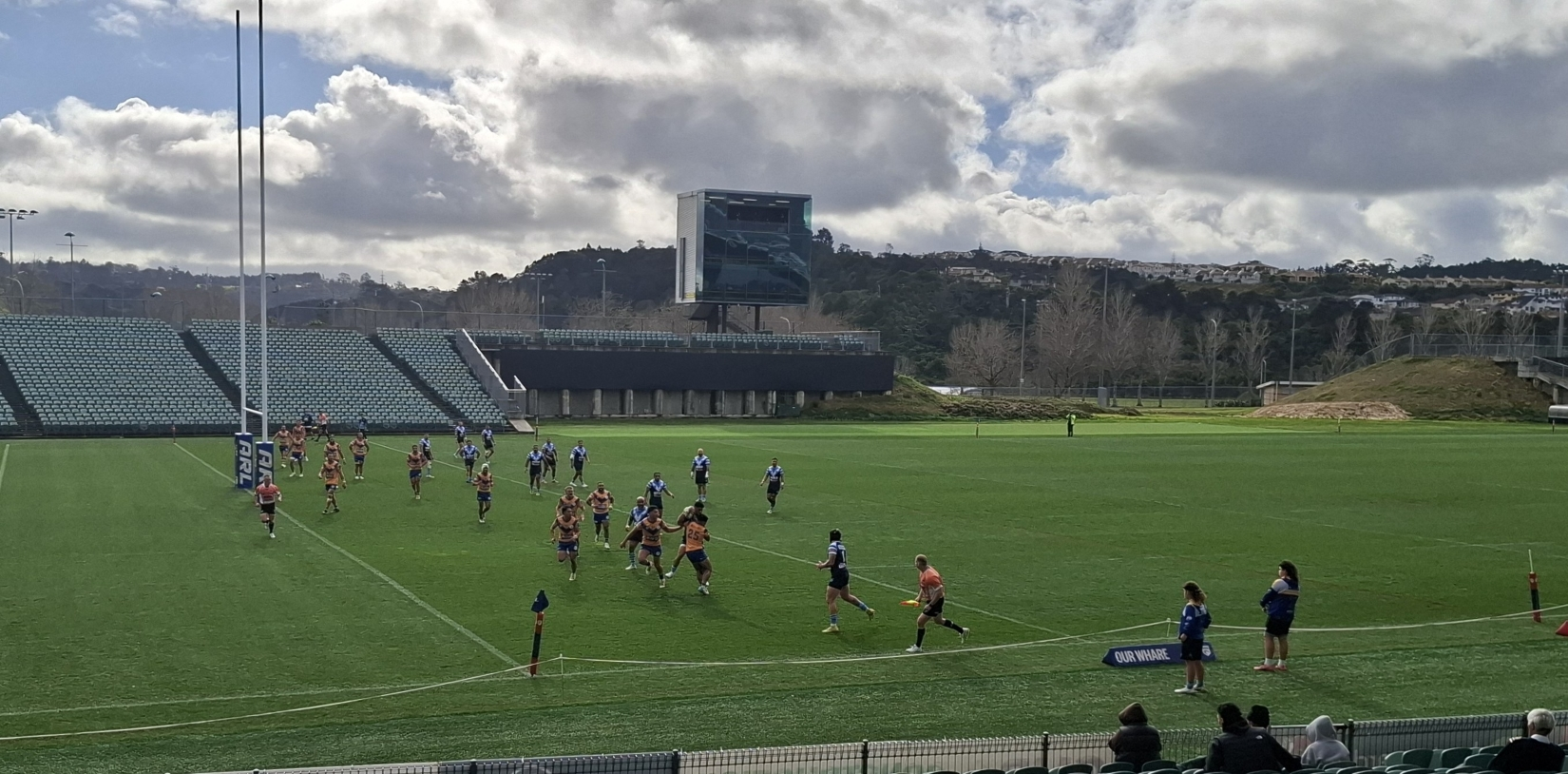
Antony Naitoko about to spin out of a tackle to give Otahuhu and 8-0 lead.

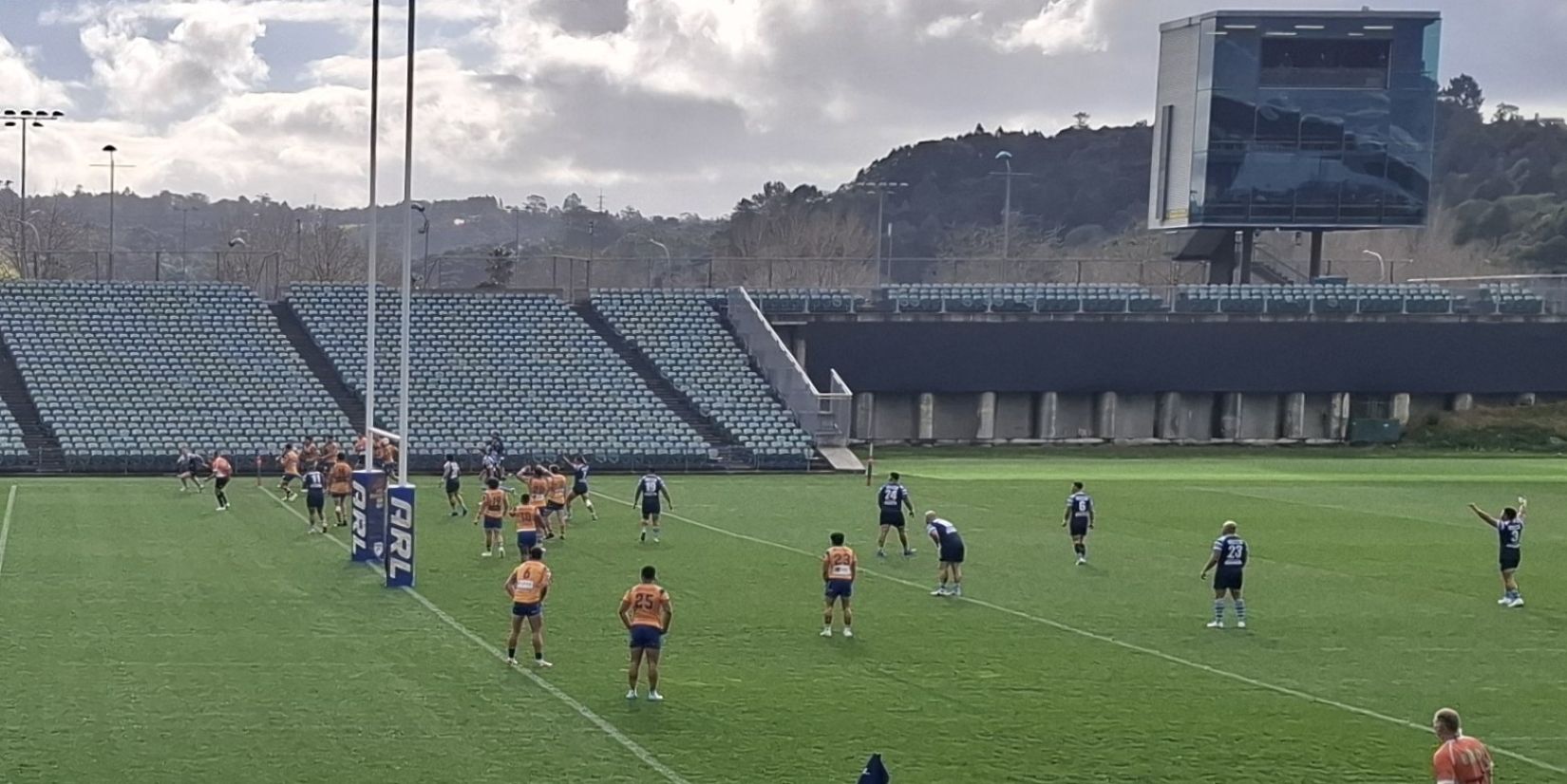
Toaiti Ramsay running in Otahuhu's third try following a Tevita Mikaele grubber kick.

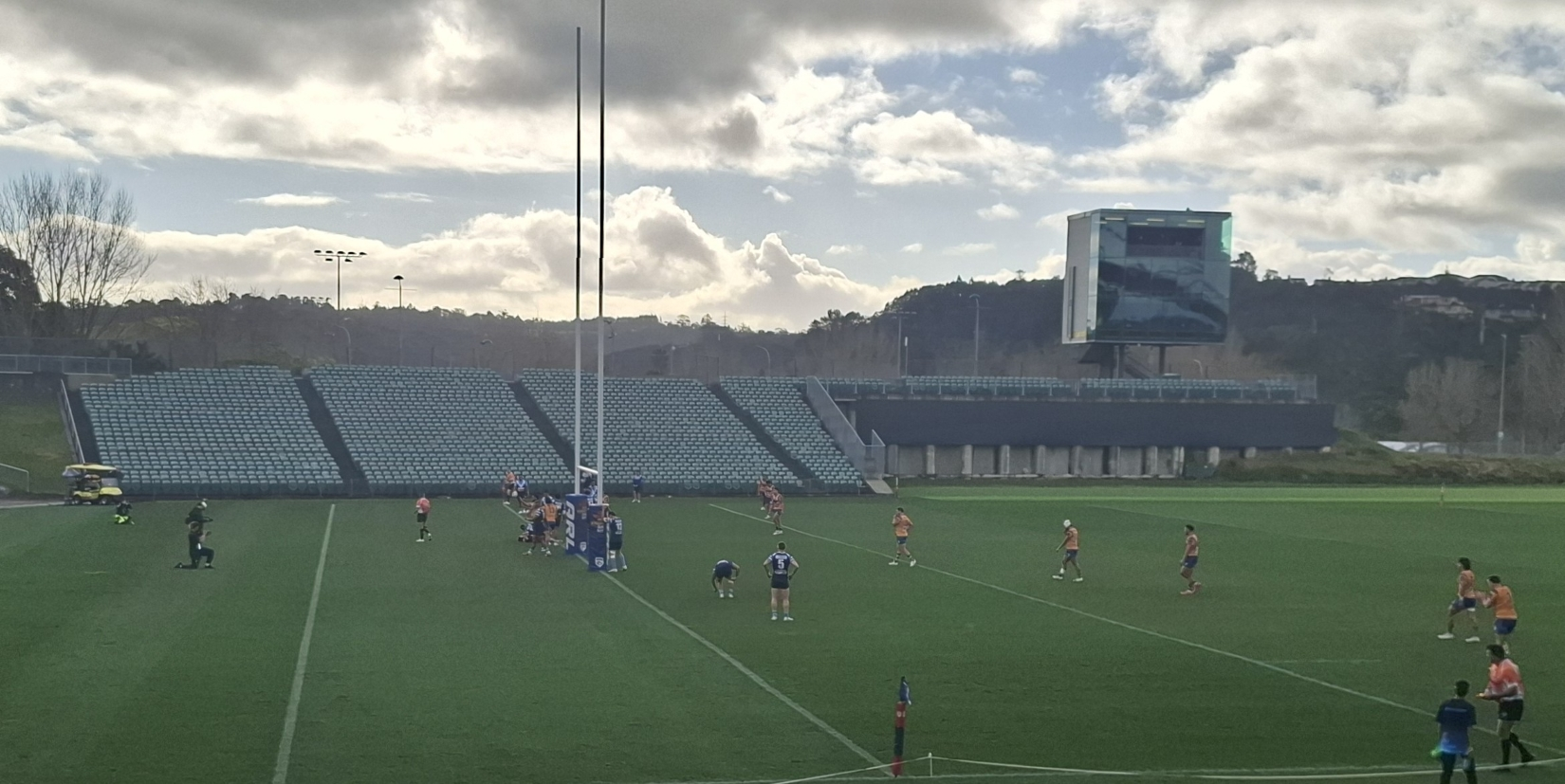
Mt Albert celebrating Navajo Doyle's try.

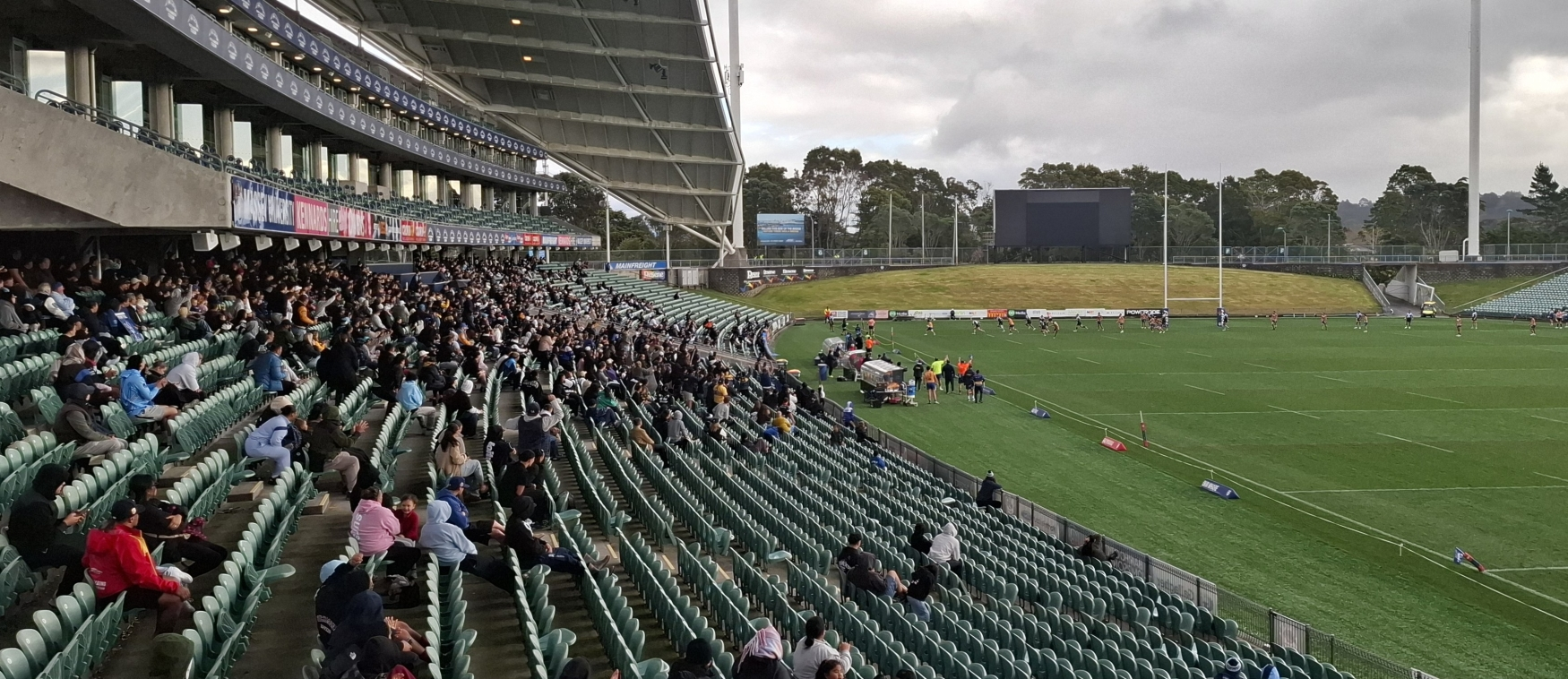
The crowd watching on as Kalepo Paualaisa crosses for a Mt Albert try.

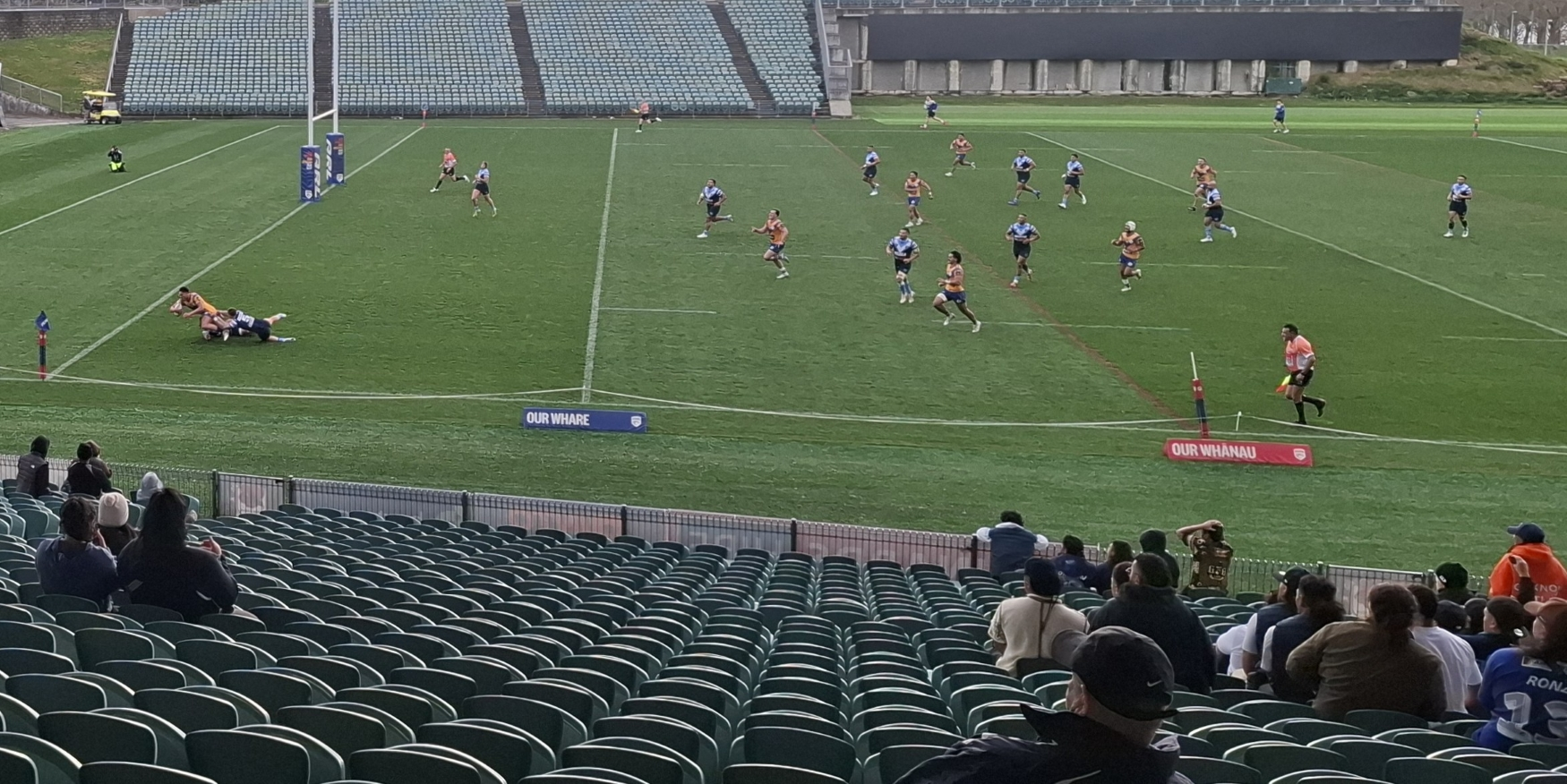
Kahu Capper putting Mt Albert 16-14 ahead with a 65 metre solo effort in the despairing tackle efforts of William Fakatoumafi and Toaiti Ramsay.

In dry conditions at North Harbour Stadium on August 16, Otahuhu opened the scoring in the 8th minute when Phoenix Hunt took a pass 15 metres out and shaped to pass but stepped hard off his right foot before sprinting through a hole and scoring 10 metres to the right of the posts. William Fakatoumafi missed the easy conversion which bounced off the right hand post after earlier missing a penalty attempt which had also hit the post and come back into the field of play. Mt Albert had some attacking opportunities over the next 15 minutes but were unable to convert before Otahuhu went over for their second try when Antony Naitoko spun out of a tackle and forced his way over to make the score 8-0 after 27 minutes. Then three minutes from halftime centre, Tevita Mikaele put in a grubber kick which took one bounce before popping up perfectly for Toaiti Ramsay to catch it and run in for a try. Fakatoumafi's first goal of the final gave the Leopards a deserved 14-0 lead at the half time break. The first 25 minutes of the second half was dominated by a desperate Mt Albert side and they went close to scoring in the 48th minute when Api Pewhairangi had the ball knocked from his hand on the tryline by James Dowie. After repeated attacking sets the Lions finally crossed when hooker, Navajo Doyle pushed his way through from dummy half on the last tackle. Kahu Cappers conversion made the score 14-6 with 22 minutes remaining. They also held a numerical advantage when Sione Feau was sinbinned after the Leopards had been penalised four times in quick succession. Just four minutes later Mt Albert again worked their way on to attack and after a left edge shift Kalepo Paualaisa dove over in the left corner. Capper converted from the touch line to narrow the margin to two. Then Mt Albert took the lead when Kahu Capper scored a brilliant solo try after running hard on to the ball 60 metres out he went through some tired defence and outpaced Fakatoumafi at fullback and Ramsay on the wing to crash over in their tackle in the left corner. His conversion attempt hit the post and bounced away with the Lions now leading 16-14 with 13 minutes remaining. Otahuhu finally turned the territory battle around and after a second penalty for a tip tackle they leveled the scored with Fakatoumafi guiding the ball through with 9 minutes remaining. The Leopards quickly moved back on to attack and forced repeat sets a shift to the right edge centre Tevita Mikaele drove through some tired defence to crash over. Fakatoumafi's conversion was unsuccessful with the Leopards leading 20-16 with 4 minutes remaining. Both teams traded sets and the full time siren sounded when Mt Albert was tackled in possession 40 metres from the Leopards line to hand Otahuhu their second successive Fox Memorial grand final. Viliami Tahitu'a was named the player of the match and awarded the Doug Price Memorial Medal.

16 August	Otahuhu	20-16 (14-0)	Mt Albert	North Harbour Stadium 1, Albany
2:45	Try: Phoenix Hunt (7m), Antony Naitoko (27m), Toaiti Ramsay (37m), Tevita Mikaele (75m); Con: William Fakatoumafi 1/4 (38m); Pen: William Fakatoumafi 1/2		Try: Navajo Doyle (57m), Kalepo Paualaisa (61m), Kahu Capper (66m); Con: Kahu Capper 2/3 (58m, 63m)	Attendance: 2,000; Referee: Paki Parkinson, TJ's: Anthony Eliott & Daniel Caddy

Team details

FB	1(7)	William Fakatoumafi
WG	2(1)	James Dowie
CE	3	Antony Naitoko
CE	4	Tevita Mikaele
WG	5	Toaiti Ramsay
SO	6	Bostyn Hakaraia
HB	7(12)	Arthur Crichton
PR	8(24)	Albert Vete
HK	9(20)	Phoenix Hunt
PR	10(13)	Jamel Hunt
SR	11(11)	Mosese Faeamani
SR	12(23)	Viliami Tahitu'a
LK	13(19)	Sebastine Ikahihifo
Emergency:
SB	14(10)	Connor Taurua-Purcell
SB	15(17)	Zion Tesese
SB	16(18)	Sione Feao
SB	17(14)	Jerry Poutu
18th	18(16)	Wes Tauti
Coach: Tusa Lafaele
Assistant Coaches: Phil Gordon and Kevin Charlie
Manager: Tania Harris
Assistant Manager: Pauline Dumper

FB	1	John Aitu
WG	2(25)	Ezekial Davidson-Faaiuso
CE	3	Thompson Karena
CE	4(6)	Kahu Capper
WG	5	Kalepo Paualaisa
SO	6(23)	Juelz Baker
HB	7(21)	Api Pewhairangi
PR	8(16)	Trent Schaumkel
HK	9	Budda Doyle (C)
PR	10	Paaua Papuni-Abbott
SR	11	Tommy Beale
SR	12	Phoenix Sorensen
LK	13	Cassius Tia
Emergency:
SB	14(15)	Aston Fraser
SB	15(18)	Marcus Fraser
SB	16(19)	AJ Balchin
SB	17(20)	Solomon Vasuvulagi
18th	18 (2)	Isaiah Fale
Coach: Trent Wallace
Assistant Coach: Paul Clarke
Manager: Matt Pene

=== Full season top try scorers and point scorers ===
==== Full season top point scorers ====
The points includes all regular season games and the semi finals and final. Dyland Tavita of Ponsonby led all scorers with 125. The former Pt Chevalier hooker scored 9 tries and kicked 44 goals and a drop goal. He achieved the feat from only regular season matches as his side failed to make the playoffs. Remarkably he was the only player in the Ponsonby side to kick any goals during the season. William Fakatoumafi was second with 120 points, though only 94 came in the regular season with 22 scored in their semi final win and 4 in the final. *In Otahuhu's first round match with Bay Roskill, James Dowie missed the final conversion attempt on full time wide to the right. However the official scorer at the game recorded it as successful. The linesmen waved the attempt away and the bartv recording shows it clearly missed, however as it is recorded as successful it has been included in the statistics.

Top point scorers
No	Player	Team	T	C	P	DG	Pts
1	Dylan Tavita	Ponsonby	9	42	2	1	125
2	William Fakatoumafi	Otahuhu	7	45	1	0	120
3	James Dowie	Otahuhu	5	40	0	0	100
4	Leti Muller	Manukau	1	39	0	0	82
5	Lorenzo Filimaua	Papakura	3	31	0	0	74
6	Josh Tanielu	Bay Roskill	5	24	2	0	72
7=	Kahn Munokoa	Manukau	16	0	0	0	64
7=	Navajo Doyle	Mt Albert	3	26	0	0	64
9=	Toaiti Ramsay	Otahuhu	14	0	0	0	56
9=	Phoenix Hunt	Otahuhu	14	0	0	0	56

==== Full season top try scorers ====
Kahn Munokoa was the leading try scorer with 16, after finishing amongst the top try scorers for three straight seasons. Unsurprisingly there were five Otahuhu players among the top 7 try scorers.

Top try scorers
No	Player	Team	Tries
1	Kahn Munokoa	Manukau	16
2=	Toaiti Ramsay	Otahuhu	14
2=	Phoenix Hunt	Otahuhu	14
4	Tevita Mikaele	Otahuhu	12
5=	Vincent Tupu	Bay Roskill	10
5=	Kalepo Paualaisa	Mt Albert	10
7=	Dylan Tavita	Ponsonby	9
7=	Patolo Taito	Otahuhu	9
7=	Connor Taurua-Purcell	Otahuhu	9
10=	Talitua Salima-Satuia	Papakura	8
10=	Nixon Leaso	Bay Roskill	8
10=	Ezekial Davidson Faaiuaso	Mt Albert	8
10=	Antony Naitoko	Mt Albert	8

===== Promotion-Relegation Match (Fox Memorial - Sharman Cup) =====
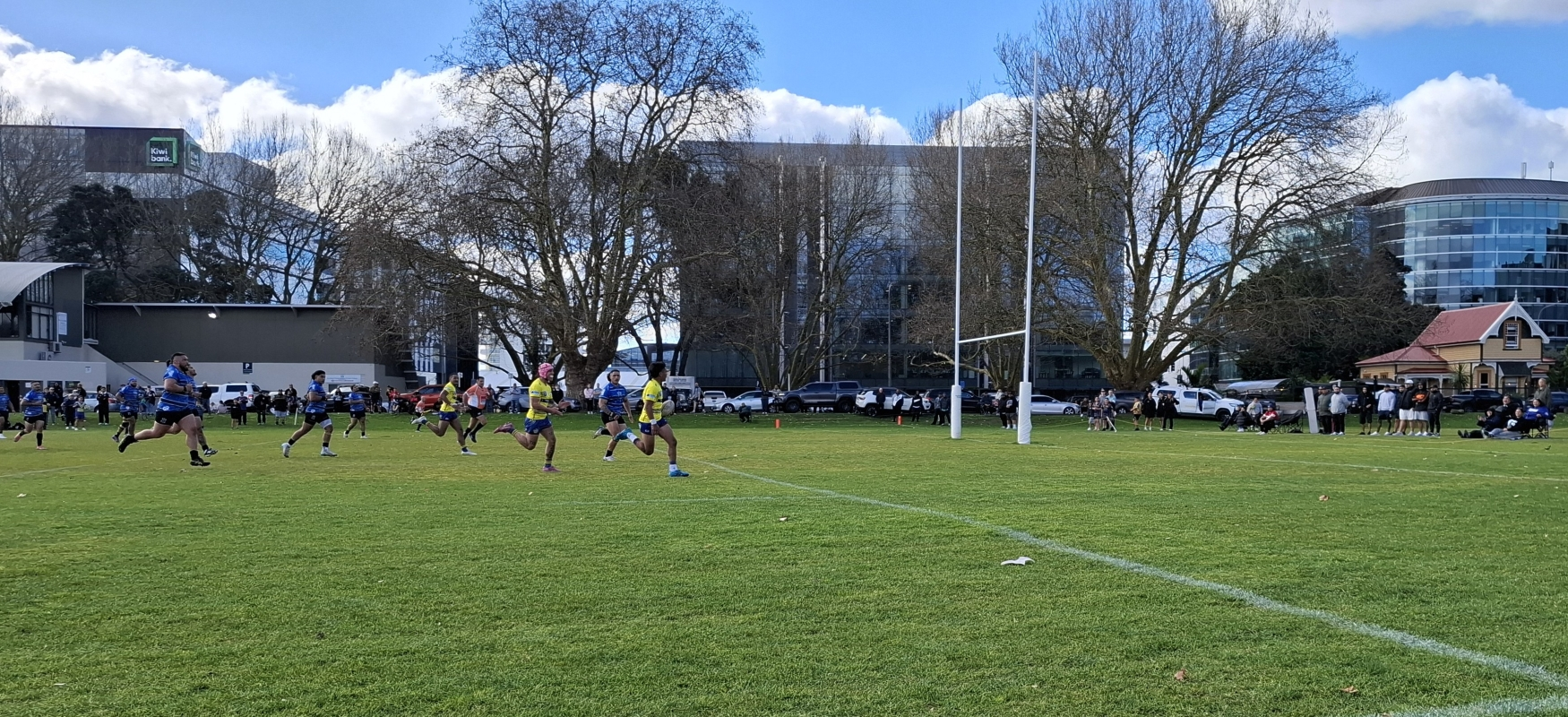
Darius Niumata opening the scoring with a solo try after breaking through the Ponsonby defence.

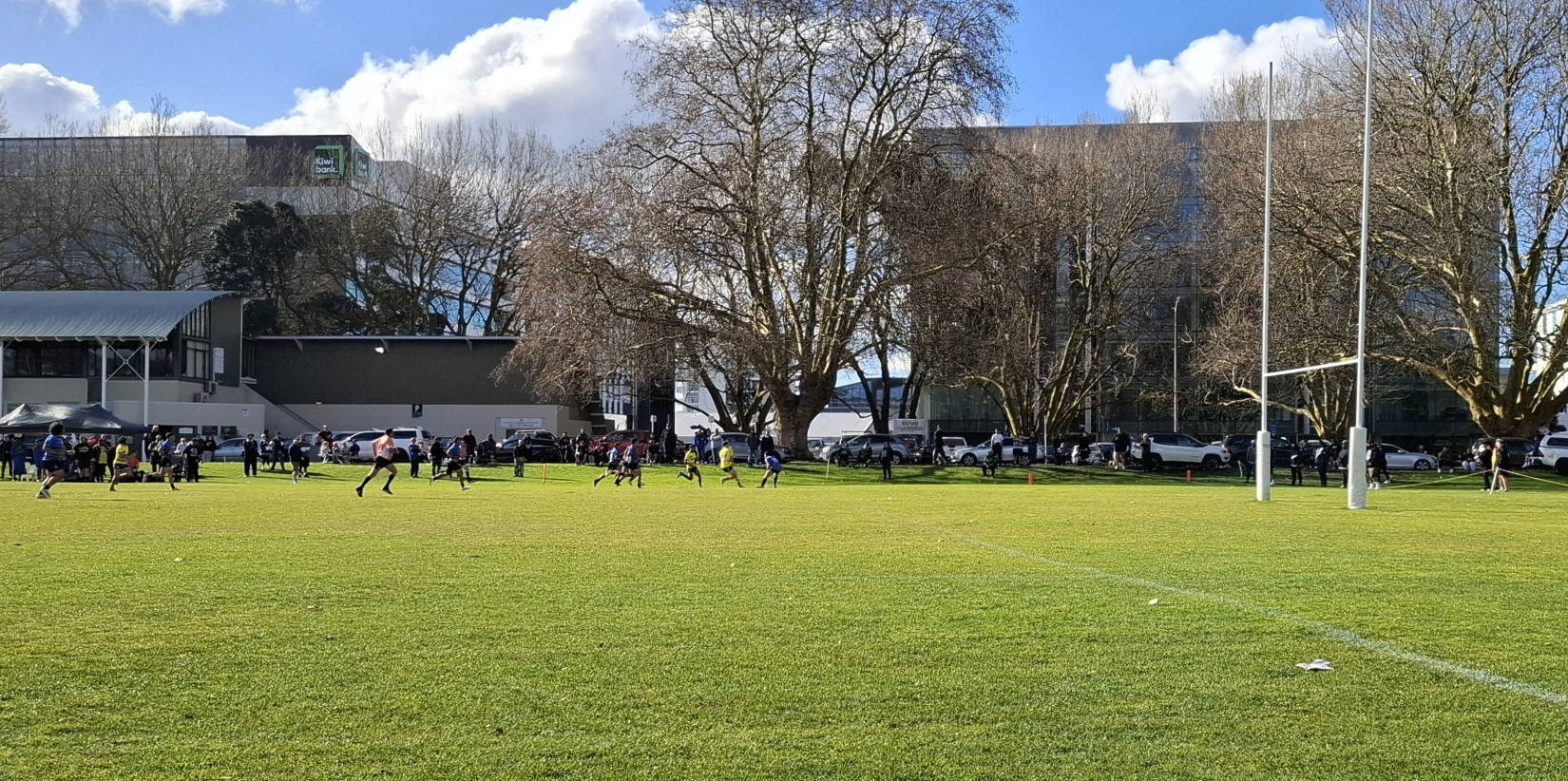
Justin Reynolds about to take the final pass to put Howick 8-6 ahead.

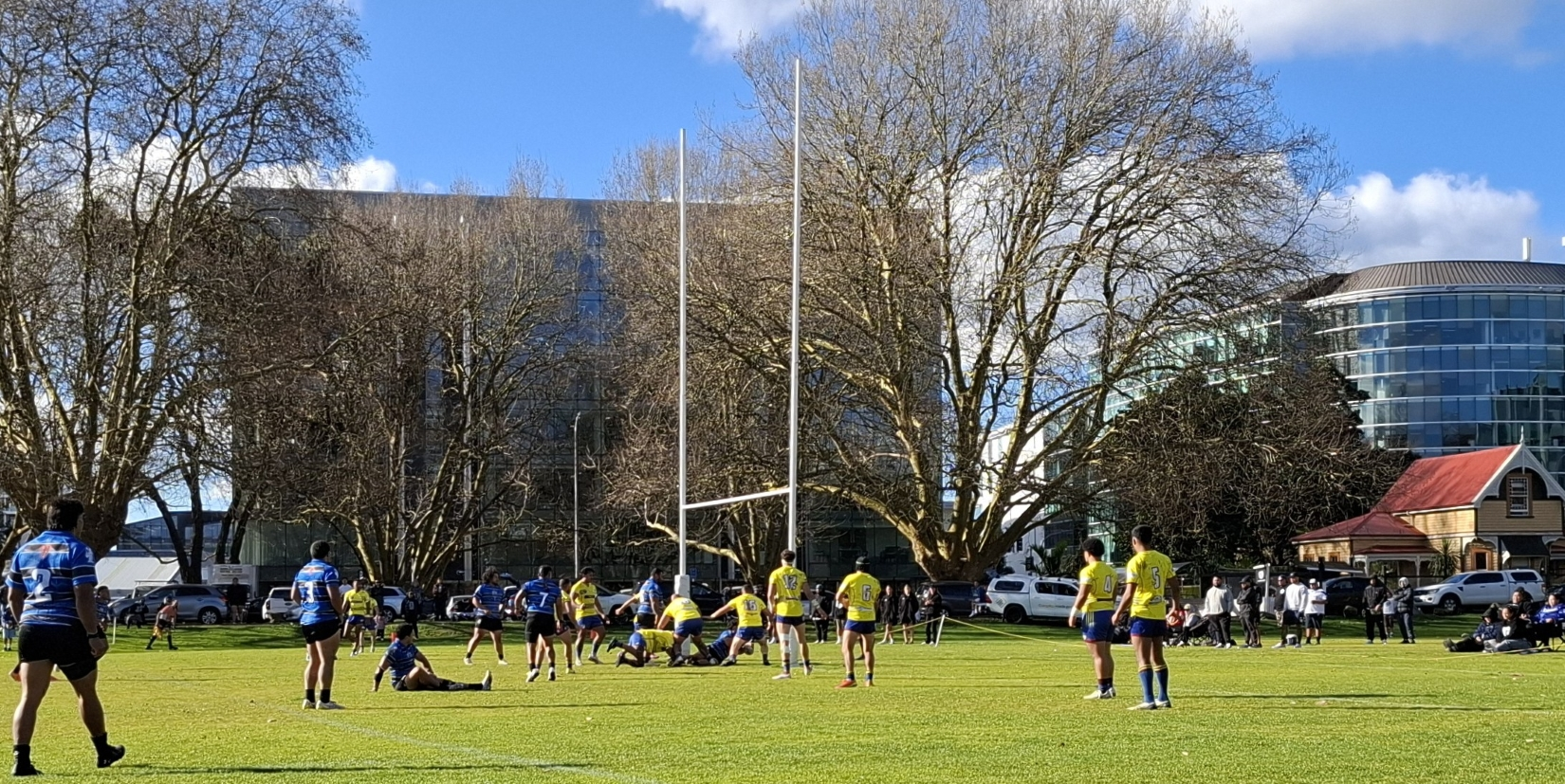
Ben Wharton-Benedict driving through the defence to score for Ponsonby.

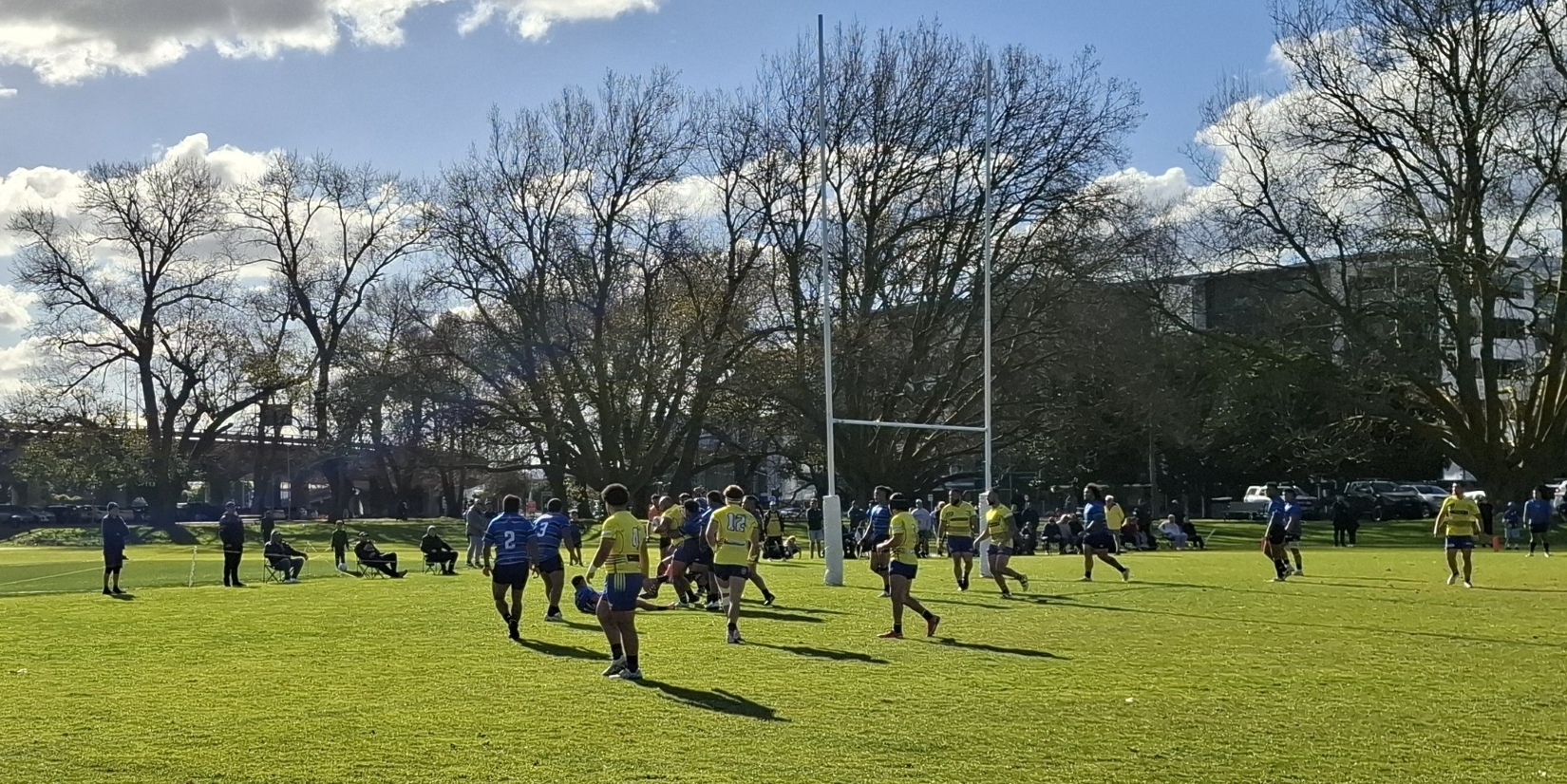
Tony Tuia after bouncing out of an attempted tackle about to push his way over to put Howick 16-12 ahead.

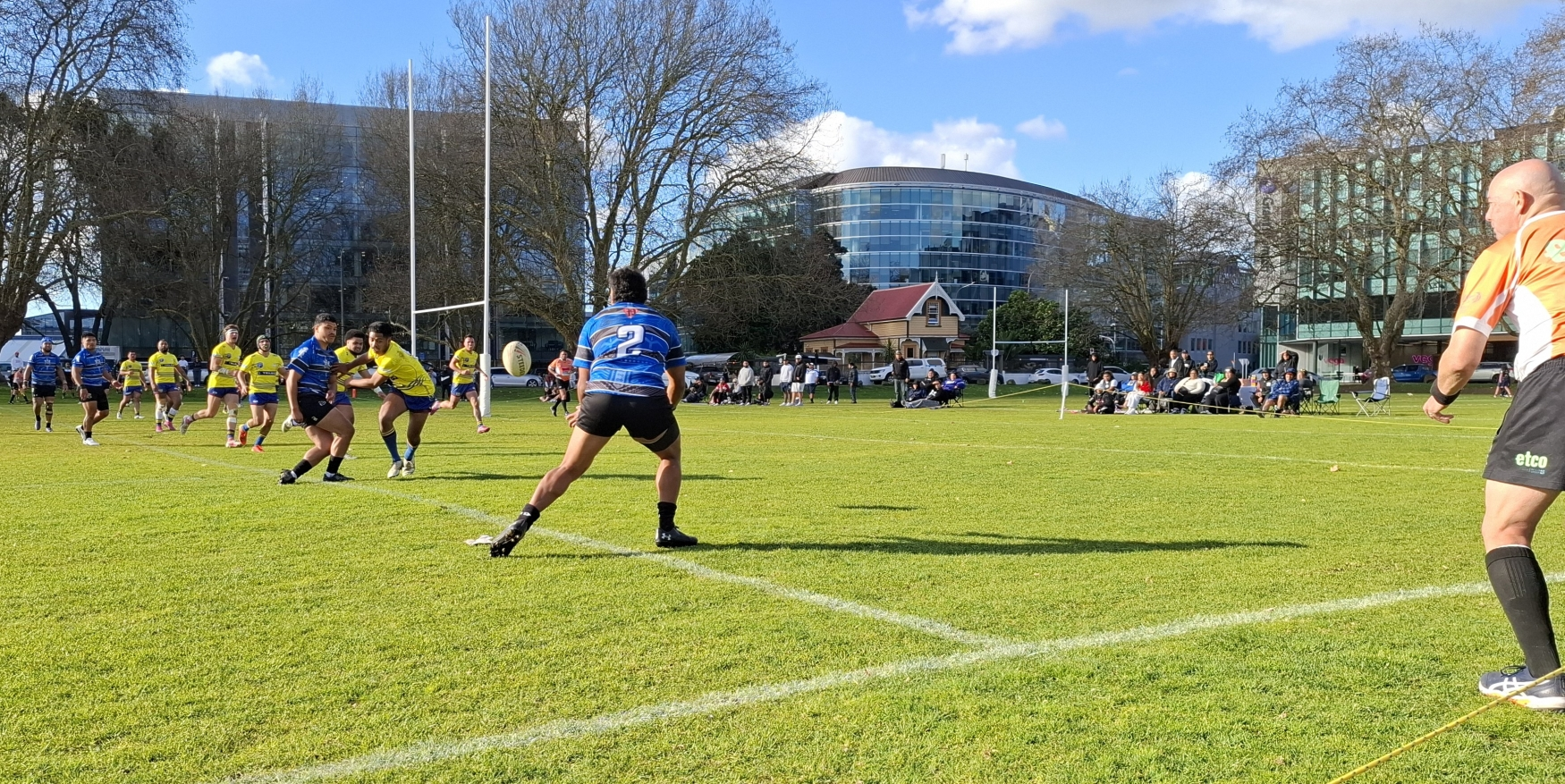
Saula Solomona taking a pass before running over to tie the scores at 16-16.

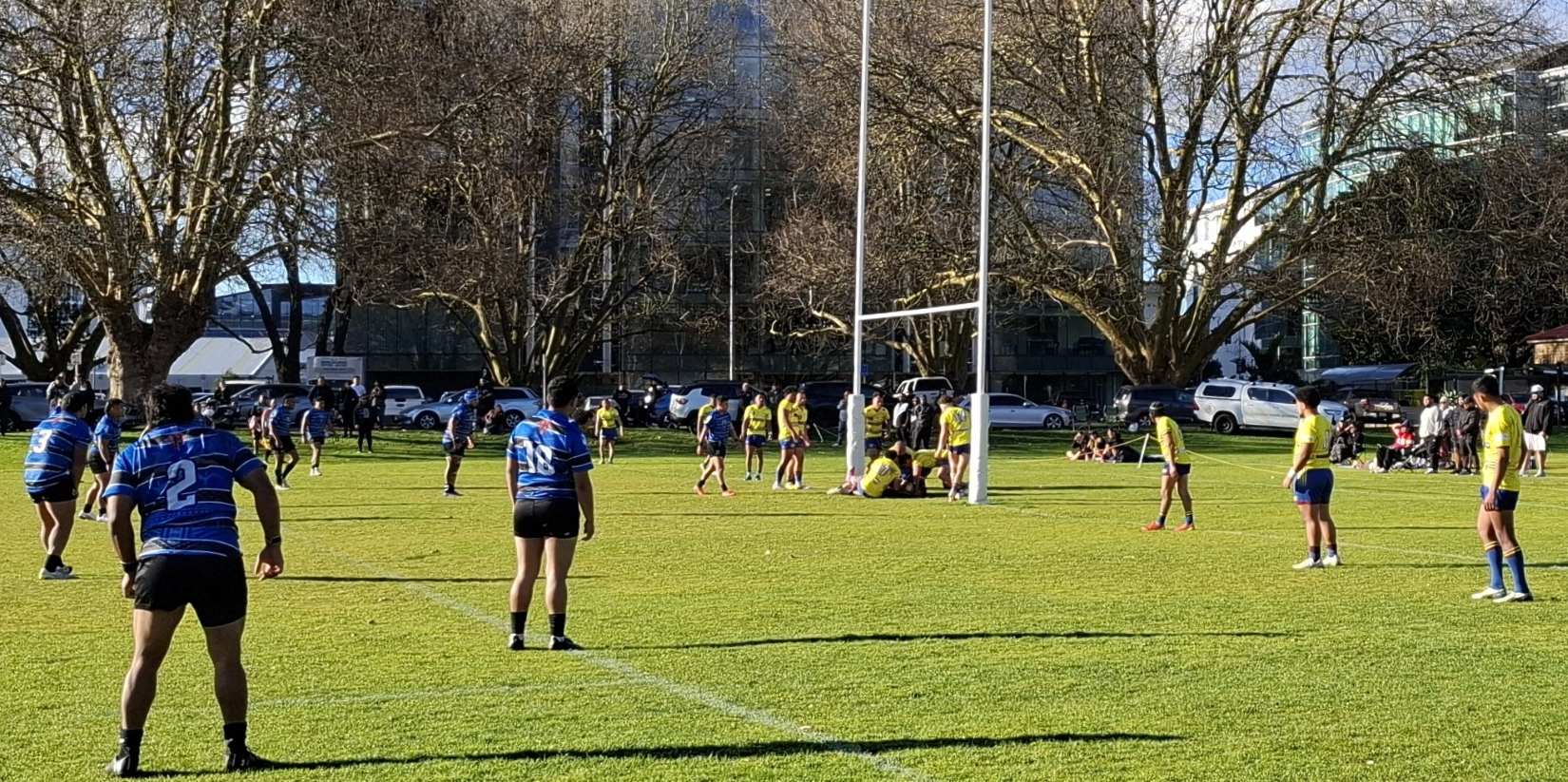
Soane Hufanga falls over the line to seal Ponsonby's win on full time.

On August 22 Ponsonby who had finished second to last in the Fox Memorial played against Howick who had finished runner up in the Sharman Cup. The match was a promotion-relegation game to find the eighth side to play in the Fox Memorial premiership for the 2027 season. It was the first time such a game had been played in well over a decade. The match was played at Victoria Park, Ponsonby's home ground. Ponsonby won 24-16 after scoring two late tries to seal victory and ensure that they stayed in the Fox Memorial competition. Howick opened the scoring in the 17th minute when Darius Niumata cut through a gap 40 metres out and ran in untouched to give the Hornets a 4-0 lead. The Ponies responded minutes later when they scored a try from close range and Dylan Tavita's conversion put them two points ahead. In the 34th minute Howick broke away on halfway and the final pass sent Justin Reynolds in to run round and score behind the posts with the conversion Howick took a 10-6 lead into half time. The second half saw the sides trade tries with Ponsonby the first to score when Ben Wharton-Benedict drove through some goal line defence to score under the posts, but then veteran prop, Tony Tuia bounced out of a tackle ten metres out and then powered over. Tuia had come out of retirement during the season to bolster Howick along with Jethro Friend who was playing at hooker. Niumata's conversion put Howick back up 16-12 with 30 minutes remaining. However Ponsonby were finishing the stronger of the two sides with their bigger forwards beginning to get on top. A right side shift saw a flat pass reach Saula Solomona and he ran in to level the scores with Tavita's conversion putting them in front 18-16. Then a minute from full time Soana Hufanga used his weight to force himself down on the tryline to seal the win before Tavita added the extras.

22 August	Ponsonby	24-16 (6-10)	Howick	Victoria Park 1, Auckland Central
2:30	Try: Unknown (21m), Ben Wharton-Benedict (41m), Saula Solomona (60m), Soane Hufanga (79m); Con: Dylan Tavita 3/3 (22m, 62m, 80m), Andre Kahui-Singh 1/1 (43m)		Try: Darius Niumata (17m), Justin Reynolds (34m), Tony Tuia (48m); Con: Darius Niumata 2/3 (35m, 49m)	Attendance: 300; Referee: Daniel Caddy, TJ's: Brent Newton & David Millar

=== Steele Shanks Women's Premiership ===
==== Standings ====
Team	Pld	W	D	L	F	A	PD	Pts
Otahuhu Women	15	14	0	1	532	222	+310	28
Manurewa Women	15	8	0	7	366	344	+22	16
Mangere East Women	15	8	0	7	384	448	-64	16
Richmond Roses	15	7	0	8	368	376	-8	14
Manukau Women	15	4	0	11	340	462	-122	8
Mt Albert Lionesses	15	4	0	11	312	450	-138	8

==== Fixtures and Results ====
===== Round 1 =====
Manurewa moved out to a 12-8 halftime lead following close range converted tries to Freesia Pokaia (7m), and Maitua Feterika (16m). Jewel Bowen dived over under the posts in the 48th minute for Mt Albert to narrow Manurewa's lead to 18-14 following Hanae Vito-Toleafoa's conversion. A Sharnyze Pihema try converted by Platinum Masters restored Manurewa's lead and then Wati Delailoloma scored on the right edge and MJ Finau scored an individual try which stared on halfway to push the result beyond doubt. Amber Kani then finished off the scoring with a try from halfway.

25 April	Otahuhu Women	42-20	Mangere East Women	Bert Henham Park 1, Otahuhu
12:45	Try: Jasmin Munro (18m), Tiana Thomson (33m), Jor-El Loto 2 (48m, 57m), Onjeurlina Hunt 2 (51m, 70m), Dayna Moon (61m), Ania Morgan (67m), Shalom Setu-Veve (73m); Con: Tiana Thomson 3/9 (35m, 53m, 71m)		Try: Akeliana-Faith Leauga (11m), Betsy Fifita (28m), Siulolovao Tauhalaliku (42m), Faryn Fitialo (79m); Con: Akeliana-Faith Leauga 2/4 (30m, 42m)	Attendance: 250; Referee: Karl Vasau, Touch Judges: Corey Jull and Chrystal Mana

25 April	Manurewa Women	36-14 (12-8)	Mt Albert Lionesses	Mountfort Park: Jack Shelly
2:30	Try: Freesia Pokaia (7m), Maitua Feterika 2 (16m, 41m), Sharnyze Pihema (52m), Wati Florence Sai Delailomaloma (55m), MJ Finau (56m), Amber Kani (62m); Con: Platinum Marsters 4/7 (8m, 17m, 42m, 53m)		Try: Kiera-Marie Sekene (12m), Patisepa Kengike (27m), Jewel Bowen (48m); Con: Kiera-Marie Sekene 0/2, Hanae Vito-Toleafoa 1/1 (49m)	Referee: Davey Misileki, Touch Judges: Moses luke Ripia and Jericho Paul

25 April	Richmond Roses	4-30	Manukau Women	Grey Lynn Park 2, Grey Lynn
2:30	Try: Maia Gorst (53m)		Try: Litia Valu (2m), Shanthie Lui 2 (12m, 51m), Josinah Filisi Tauiliili 2 (18m, 79m), Derdrey Walker-Tuiletufuga (57m); Con: Shanthie Lui 3 (19m, 52m, 58m)	Referee: Kahi Johnson, Touch Judges: Dayton Ryan and Oliver Broadhead

===== Round 2 =====
2 May	Mt Albert Lionesses	20-40	Richmond Roses	Fowlds Park 1, Morningside
12:45	Try: Patisepa Kengike (3m), Tuiala Too (18m), Jewel Bowen (33m), Anastasia Sekene (63m); Con: Hanae Vito-Toleafoa (19m, 65m)		Try: Azariah Amosa (7m), Demielle Onesemo-Tuilaepa 2 (25m, 77m), Elisapeci Matanatabu 3 (38m, 42m, 69m), Luisa Kuli 2 (59m, 80m); Con: Mikayla Suluapa 4 (26m, 39m, 43m, 78m)	Referee: Kahi Thompson

2 May	Otahuhu Women	48-20	Manukau Women	Bert Henham Park 1, Otahuhu
12:45	Try: Charlize Cairns (1m), Onjeurlina Hunt (13m), Ivana Lauitiiti 2 (21m, 25m), Alaina Lauitiiti (63m), Jasmin Munro 2 (66m, 80m), Georgie Wharton-Benedict (72m), Jor-El Loto (75m); Con: Tiana Thomson 6/9 (14m, 22m, 26m, 64m, 68m, 80m)		Try: Litia Valu (4m), Aleeya Miiariyana Opara Koi (34m), Shanthia Lui (42m), Josinah Filisi Tauliili (46m); Con: Shanthie Lui 2 (36m, 47m)	Referee: Davey Misileki, TJ’s: Curtis Wharewaka & Moses Luke Ripia

2 May	Mangere East Women	28-12	Manurewa Marlins Women	Walter Massey Park 1, Mangere
2:30	Try: Sophie-Lee Uta-atu (18m), Tiare-Anne Leauga (27m), Siulolovao Tauhalaliku (30m), Faith Tavita 2 (53m, 63m), Kyla Lynch-Brown (60m); Con: Akeliana-Faith Leauga (32m, 61m)		Try: Sharnyze Pihema (4m), Maitua Feterika (78m); Con: Platinum Marsters 2/2 (6m, 80m)	Referee: Nigel Williams, TJ’s: Saane Mosaati & Aphichart Korhomklang

===== Round 3 =====
9 May	Manurewa Women	18-28 (8-10)	Otahuhu Women	Mountfort Park: Jack Shelly Field, Manurewa
12:45	Try: Freesia Pokaia (11m), Mikayla Kalolo (37m), Daysha Tango-Rairi (62m), Maitua Feterika (72m); Con: Platinum Marsters 1/4 (73m)		Try: Nevaeh Henry 2 (17m, 48m), Alaina Lautiiti 2 (22m, 77m), Tiana Thomson (52m); Con: Tiana Thomson 4/5 (23m, 49m, 53m, 78m)	Referee: Kahi Thompson

9 May	Manukau Women	22-24 (6-12)	Mt Albert Lionesses	Moyle Park 1, Māngere
2:30	Try: Shafenior Lui 3 (18m, 44m, 58m) Josinah Filisi Tauliili (65m); Con: Shanthie Lui 3/4 (19m, 59m, 66m)		Try: Patisepa Kengike (11m), Kiera-Marie Sekene 2 (24m, 53m), Hanae Vito-Toleafoa (30m), Ocean Tierney (40m), Te Aroha Neal (77m); Con: Kiera-Marie Sekene 0/6	Referee: Davey Misileki

9 May	Richmond Roses	30-14 (10-8)	Mangere East Hawks	Grey Lynn Park 2, Grey Lynn
2:30	Try: Tyra-Lee Woodhouse (4m), Rialani Onesemo-Tuilaepa (35m), Aleisha Taylor 2 (46m, 51m), Demielle Onesemo-Tuilaepa (59m), Maeva Atatoa Carr (61m); Con: Mikayla Suluape 2 (37m, 52m); Pen: Mikayla Suluape (80m)		Try: Faith Tavita (24m), Nirvana Uta'atu (40m), Faryn Fitialo (69m); Con: Akeliana-Faith Leauga (70m)	Referee: Poriau Uamaki

===== Round 4 =====
16 May	Mangere East Women	32-30 (16-12)	Mt Albert Lionesses	Walter Massey Park 1, Mangere
12:45	Try: Tiare-Anne Leauga 2 (16m, 69m), Betsy Fifita (31m), Faith Tavita 2 (38m, 65m), Sophie-Lee Uta'atu (80m); Con: Akeliana-Faith Leauga 4/6 (32m, 39m, 71m, 80m)		Try: Kiera-Marie Sekene 2 (2m, 53m), Patisepa Kengike 2 (8m, 60m), Elxus Alo (27m), Sina Tuitupou (75m); Con: Kiera-Marie Sekene 3/6 (54m, 62m, 76m)	Referee: David Millar

16 May	Manukau Women	34-28 (16-14)	Manurewa Women	Moyle Park 1, Mangere
12:45	Try: May Fueina Sasa 2 (11m, 55m), Josinah Filisi Tauiliili 2 (19m, 25m), Lavinia Liufau (45m), Shafenior Lui (80m); Con: Shafenior Lui 5/6 (20m, 26m, 47m, 56m, 80m)		Try: Freesia Pokaia (2m), Alexis Thompson (31m), Nikita Simpson (39m), Sharnyze Pihema (64m), Maitua Feterika (69m), Carnetra Nathan (76m); Con: Platinum Marsters (3m, 77m)	Referee: James Priest

16 May	Otahuhu Women	16-28 (8-6)	Richmond Roses	Bert Henham Park 1, Otahuhu
12:45	Try: Alaina Lautiiti (30m), Jeyla Ropati (44m), Jor-El Loto (74m); Con: Tiana Thomson (31m); Pen: Tiana Thomson (40m)		Try: Aleisha Taylor (14m), Azariah Amosa (48m), Elisapeci Matanatabu (54m), Demielle Onesemo-Tuilaepa (66m), Riley Pasese (69m); Con: Mikayla Suluape (15m, 56m, 67m, 71m)	Referee: Nigel Williams

===== Round 5 =====
Otahuhu dominated Mt Albert in the first half and led 30-0 at the break at Fowlds Park. Mt Albert Lionesses proved more resilient in the second half and actually outscored Otahuhu 2 tries to 1. For Otahuhu Dayna Moon scored twice while Tiana Thomson converted all of their five tries, with Onjeurlina Hunt adding an unconverted try in the second half.

23 May	Mt Albert Lionesses	8-34 (0-30)	Otahuhu Women	Fowlds Park 1, Morningside
12:45	Try: Patisepa Kengike, Johreena Sekene		Try: Charlize Cairns, Shalom Setu-Veve, Ania Morgan, Dayna Moon 2, Onjeurlina Hunt; Con: Tiana Thomson 5	Referee: James Priest, TJ’s: Liam Clayton

23 May	Richmond Roses	24-8 (6-8)	Manurewa Women	Grey Lynn Park 1, Grey Lynn
2:30	Try: Demielle Onesemo-Tuilaepa (32m), Riley Pasese (54m), Maeva Atatoa Carr (75m), Mikayla Suluape (80m); Con: Mikayla Suluape 4 (33m, 55m, 76m, 80m)		Try: Wati Florence Sai Delailomaloma (3m), Nikita Simpson (40m)	Referee: Jordan Chand

23 May	Mangere East Women	30-26 (22-8)	Manukau Women	Walter Massey Park 1, Māngere
2:30	Try: Kyla Lynch-Brown (6m), Siulolovao Tauhalaliku (10m), Tonga Toutai (24m), Kalonikakala Fifita (27m), Akeliana-Faith Leauga (32m), Maraea Toia (47m), Faith Tavita (51m); Con: Akeliana-Faith Leauga (7m)		Try: Mya Tony 2 (18m, 59m), Abigail Sharon Aukuso 2 (38m, 71m), Salaa Jasmine Apulu (67m), Shaniah Lui (80m); Con: Josinah Filisi Tauliili (60m)	Referee: Nigel Williams

===== Round 6 =====
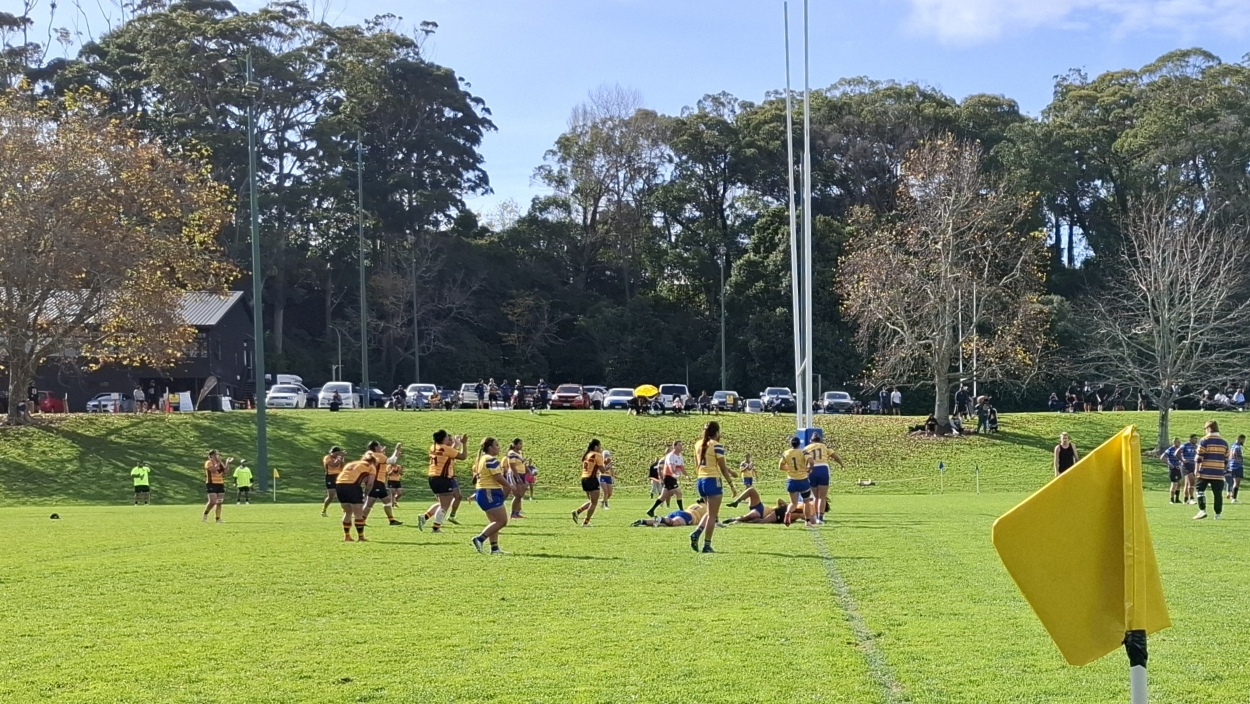
Platinum Marsters scoring the opening try for Manurewa.

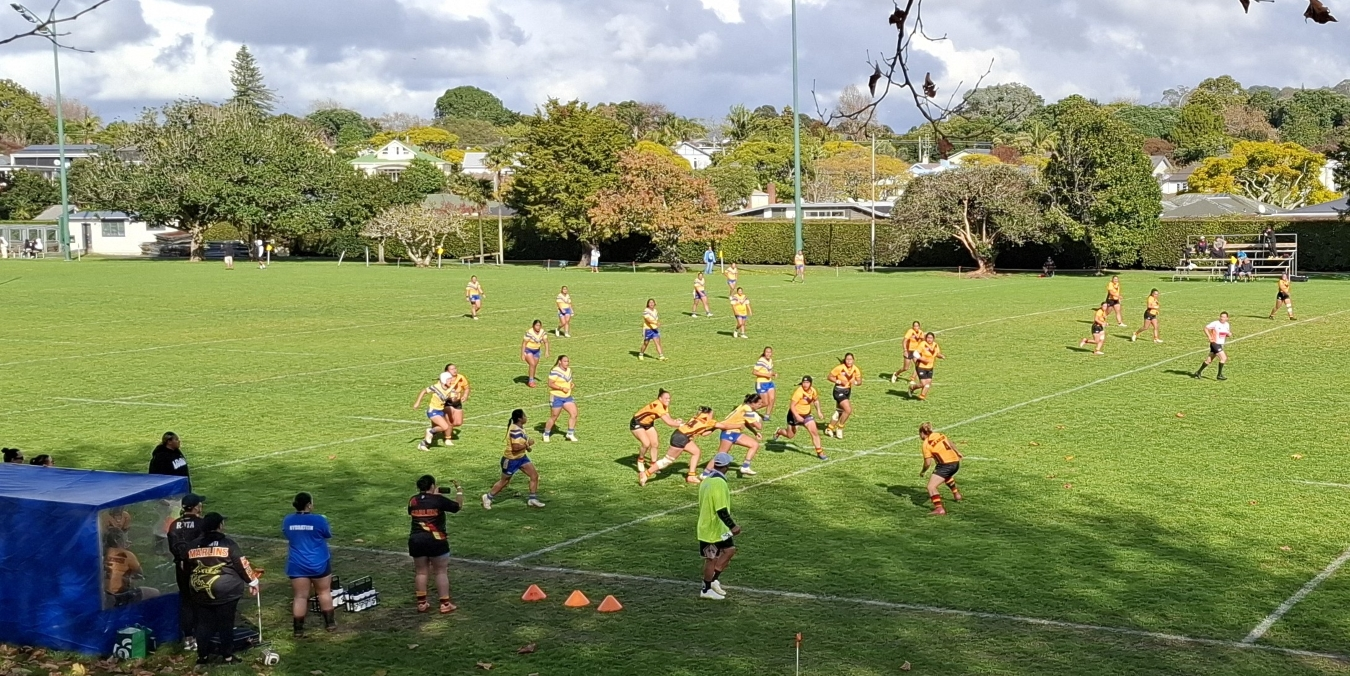
Mt Albert attacking from halfway.

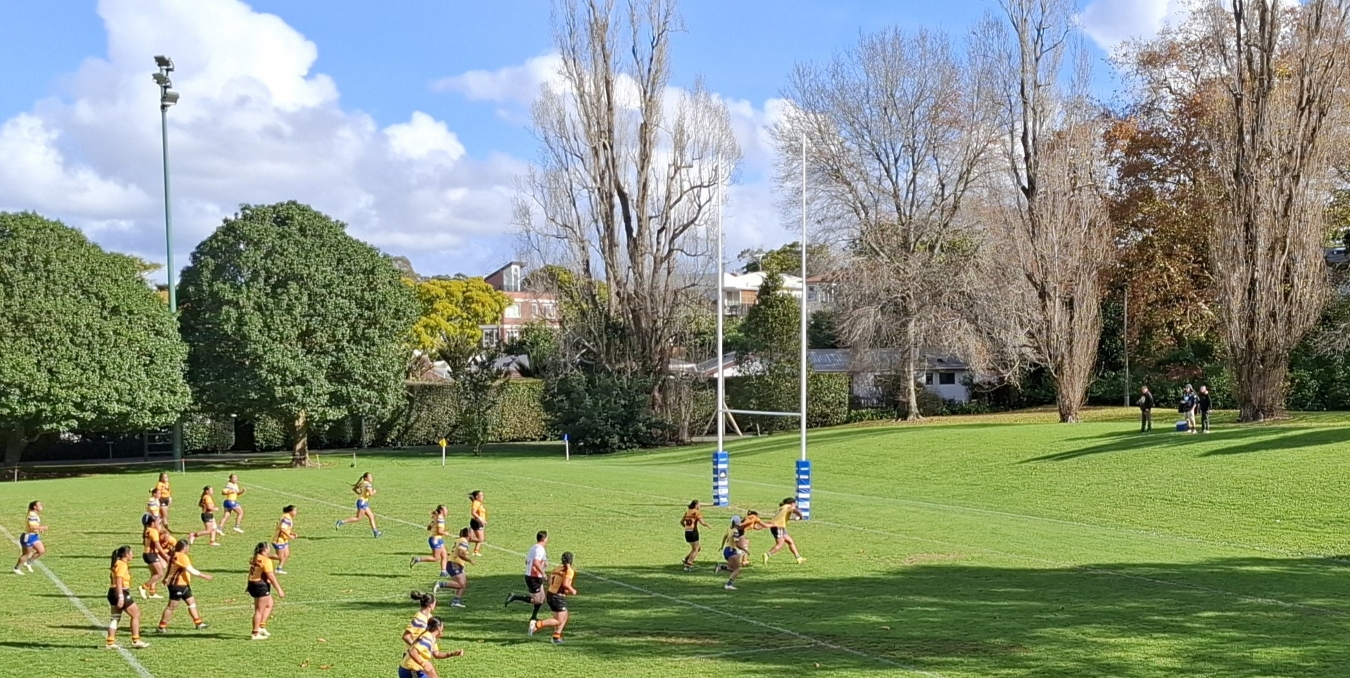
Mafi Faukafa scoring Mt Albert's opening try to level the scores.

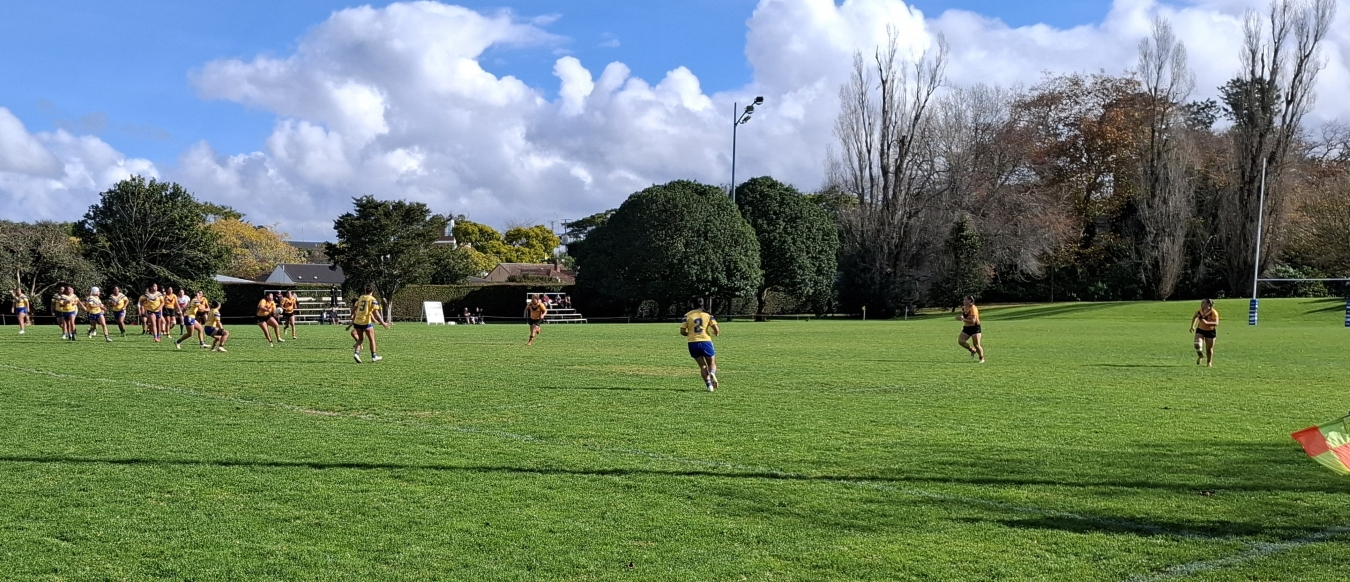
Manurewa attacking shortly before Florence Sai scored in the 18th minute.

Manurewa were too strong for the Mt Albert Lionesses securing a 22 point win. They opened the scoring after Mt Albert spilled a kick and Platinum Marsters went over from close range. Mt Albert replied when Amber Kani dropped the ball and Mafi Faukafa picked it up and carried defender Dellis Tuitupou over the line to score. The teams traded tries with Manurewa leading 18-12 at the break. They ran away with the win in the second half with a hat trick to Freesia Mokaia and Florence Sai scoring her second. Marsters converted six of their seven tries. At Walter Massey Park the home team led 16-4 at halftime but Otahuhu had levelled the scores by the 51st minute with three quick tries. They took the lead when Lourdes Tuiala scored her second try in the 69th minute and added another to Jeyla Ropati when she scored her second. At Moyle Park the home side could only manage a last minute consolation try to Josinah Filisi Tauliili and the visiting Richmond Roses ran out 46-6 winners. Genesis Atai scored a double as did Elisapeci Matanatabu with Mikayla Suluape scoring a try and kicking four conversions.

30 May	Mt Albert Lionesses	18-40 (12-18)	Manurewa Women	Fowlds Park 1, Morningside
12:45	Try: Mafi Faukafa 2 (15m, 53m), Keri Ratima (26m); Con: Kiera-Marie Sekene 3/3 (16m, 27m, 54m)		Try: Platinum Marsters (9m), Florence Sai 2 (18m, 58m), Alexis Thompson (33m), Freesia Pokaia 3 (45m, 67m, 76m); Con: Platinum Marsters 6/7 (9m, 20m, 34m, 46m, 72m, 77m)	Referee: Jordan Chand, TJ's: Dayton Ryan and ?

30 May	Mangere East Women	16-26 (16-4)	Otahuhu Women	Walter Massey Park 1, Māngere
2:30	Try: Kalonikakala Fifita (14m), Angelica Mekemeke Vahai (22m), Elenoa Havea (38m); Con: Akeliana-Faith Leauga 2 (15m, 23m)		Try: Elizabeth Bellis (3m), Jeyla Ropati 2 (43m, 73m), Lourdes Tuiala 2 (47m, 69m), Georgia Wharton-Benedict (51m); Con: Tiana Thomson (70m)	Referee: David Misileki

30 May	Manukau Women	6-46 (0-20)	Richmond Roses	Moyle Park 1, Māngere
2:30	Try: Josinah Filisi Tauliili (80m); Con: Shaniah Lui (80m)		Try: Azariah Amosa (7m), Genesis Atai 2 (29m, 41m), Demielle Onesemo-Tuilaepa (33m), Aleisha Taylor (38m), Elisapeci Matanatabu 2 (45m, 52m), Mikayla Suluapa (55m), Matireamakura Allen (65m); Con: Mikayla Suluape 4 (34m, 39m, 53m, 56m), Aleisha Taylor (68m)	Referee: Gabriel Thompson

===== Round 7 =====
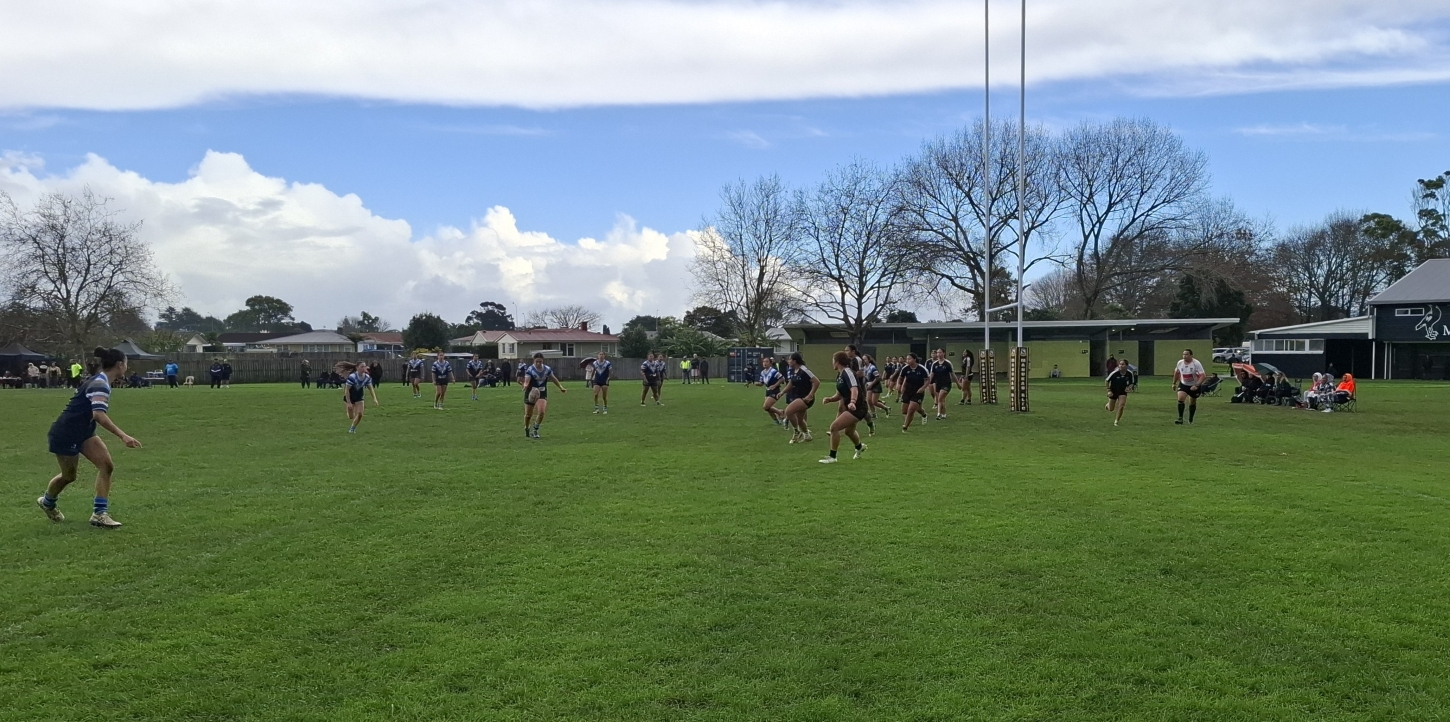
Tiana Thomson (Otahuhu) kicking for her winger Jasmin Munro at Moyle Park.

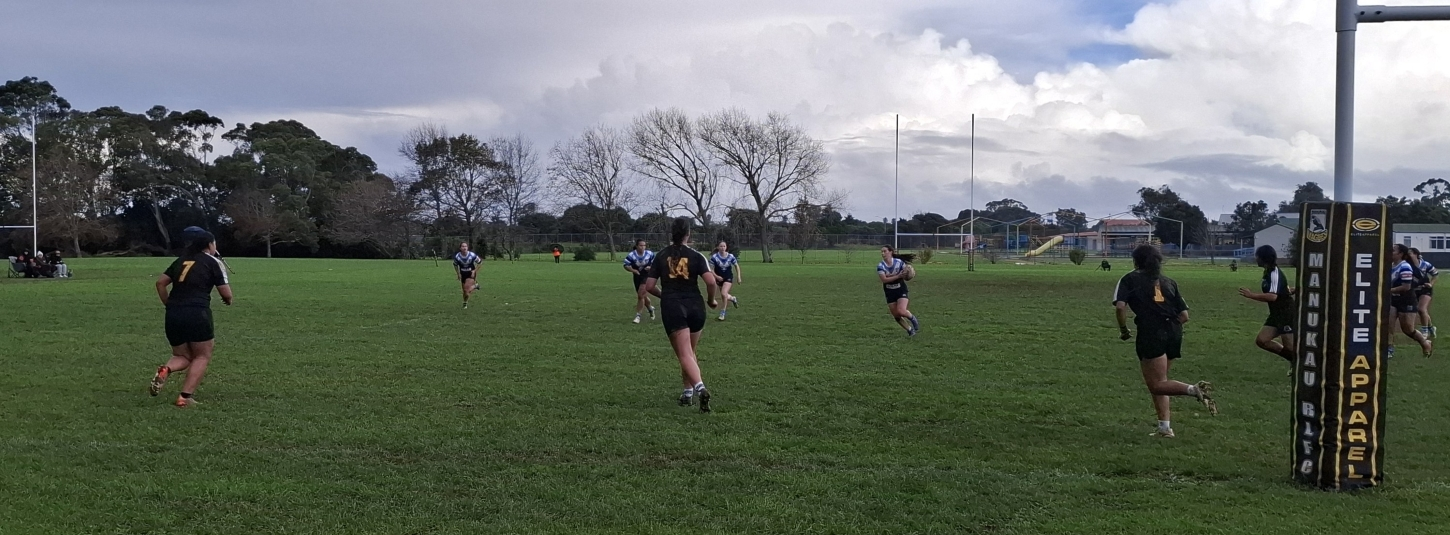
Thomson about to kick through the line for George Wharton-Benedict to chase but the ball went dead in goal.

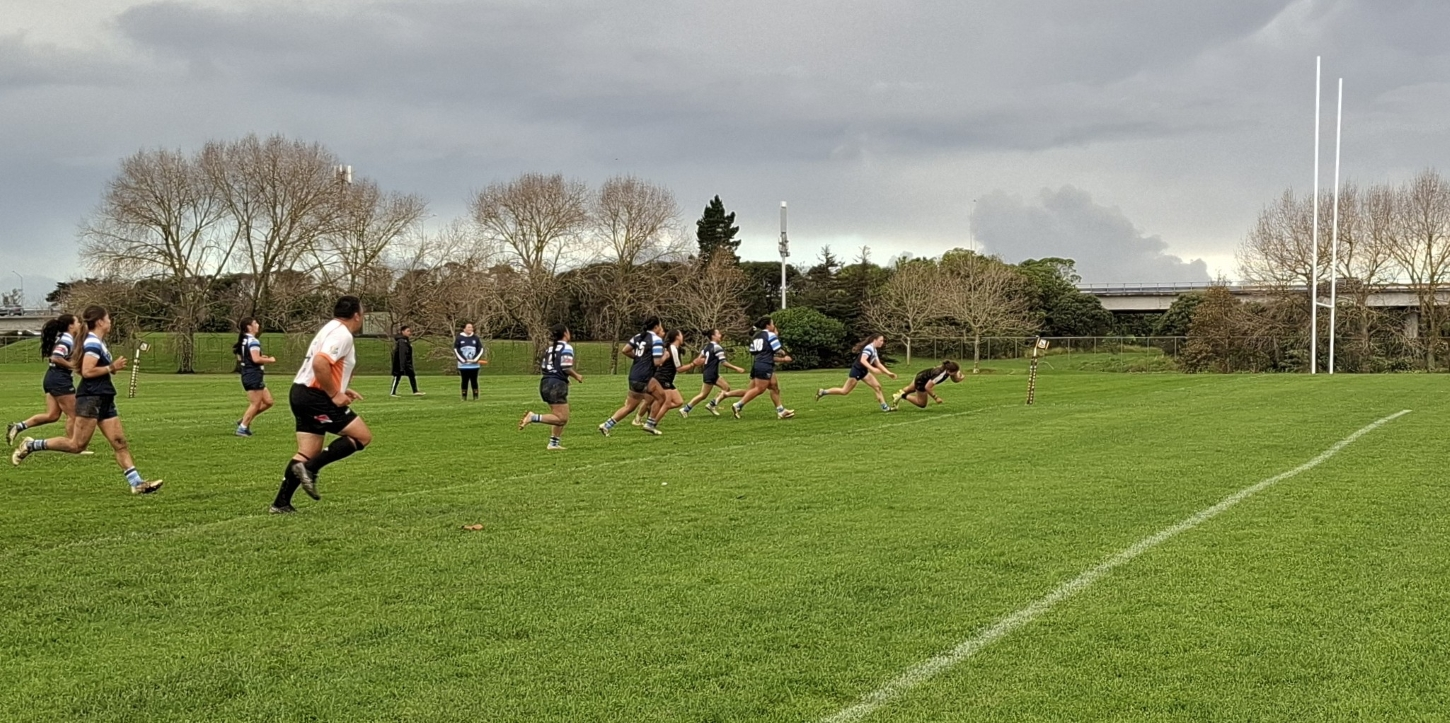
Shaniah Lui scoring in the corner for Manukau to narrow the score to 18-10.

6 June	Manukau Women	22-24 (6-18)	Otahuhu Women	Moyle Park 1, Māngere
12:45	Try: Josinah Tauliili 2 (5m, 57m), Shaniah Lui (52m), Dedrey Walker-Tuiletufuga (62m); Con: Josinah Tauliili 3/4 (6m, 58m, 63m)		Try: Monica Samita (17m), Georgine-Louise Smalley (35m), Alaina Lauitiiti (38m), Onjeurlina Hunt (71m); Con: Tiana Thomson 4/4 (18m, 36m, 40m, 73m)	Referee: Gabriel Thompson

6 June	Manurewa Women	56-4 (30-0)	Mangere East Women	Mountfort Park: Jack Shelly Field, Manurewa
12:45	Try: Nikita Simpson 2 (9m, 71m), Amber Kani 2 (12m, 49m), Florence Sai Delailomaloma 2 (19m, 43m), Freesia Pokaia (29m), Alexis Thompson 2 (33m, 62m), Maitua Feterika 2 (39m, 46m); Con: Platinum Marsters 6/11 (19m, 30m, 40m, 44m, 47m, 50m)		Try: Sophie-Lee Uta'atu (68m)	Referee: Nigel Williams

6 June	Richmond Roses	28-34 (12-16)	Mt Albert Lionesses	Grey Lynn Park 1, Grey Lynn
12:45	Try: Aleisha Taylor (16m), Mikayla Suluape 2 (29m, 71m), Riley Pasese (45m), Genesis Atai (64m); Con: Mikayla Suluape 4 (17m, 31m, 72m, +?m)		Try: Alexus Alo (4m), Rheaan Limatoa (10m), Kiera-Marie Sekene 3 (32m, 37m, 71m), Te Aroha Neal (42m), Anastacia Afu (51m); Con: Kiera-Marie Sekene 3 (6m, 38m, 78m)	Referee: Davey Misileki

===== Round 8 =====
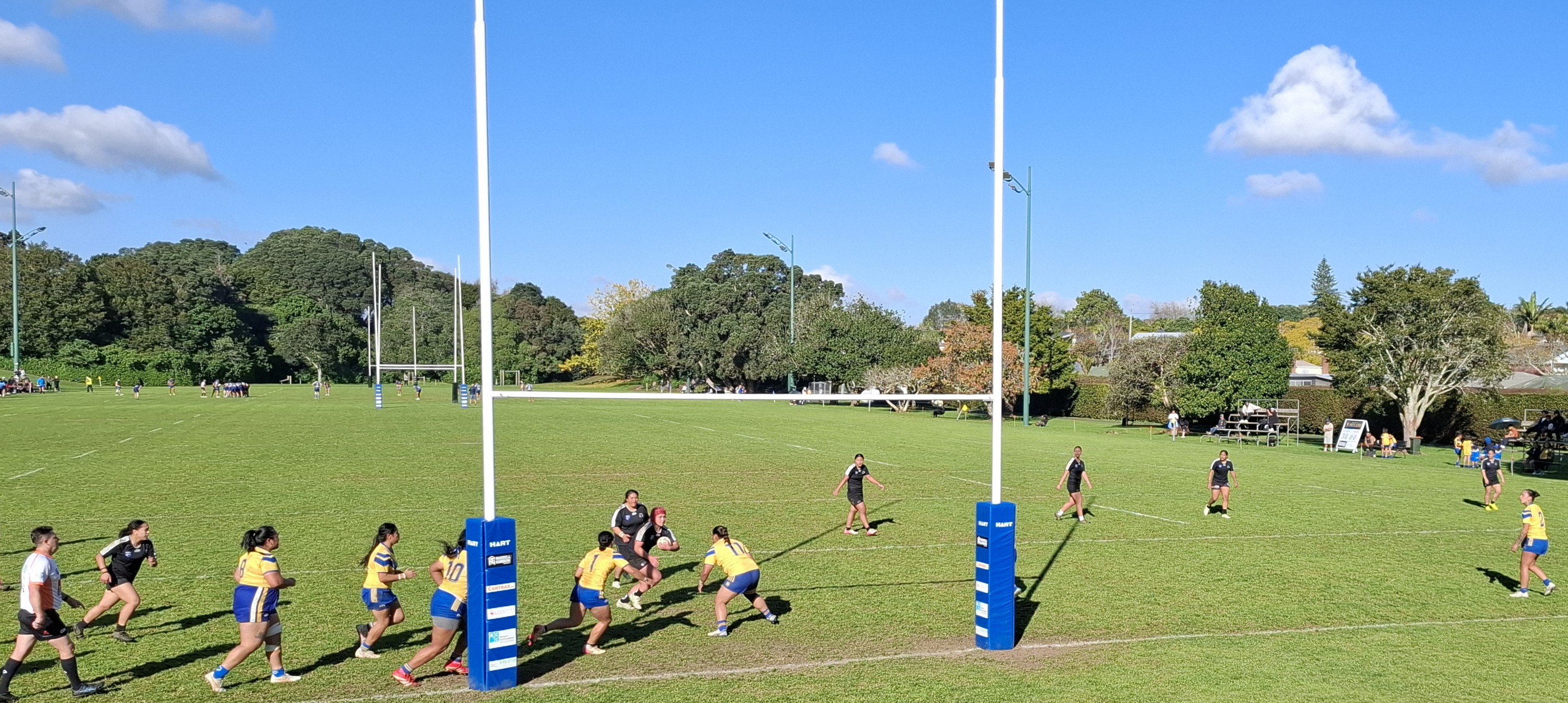
Mt Albert Lionesses defending their try line midway through the second half.

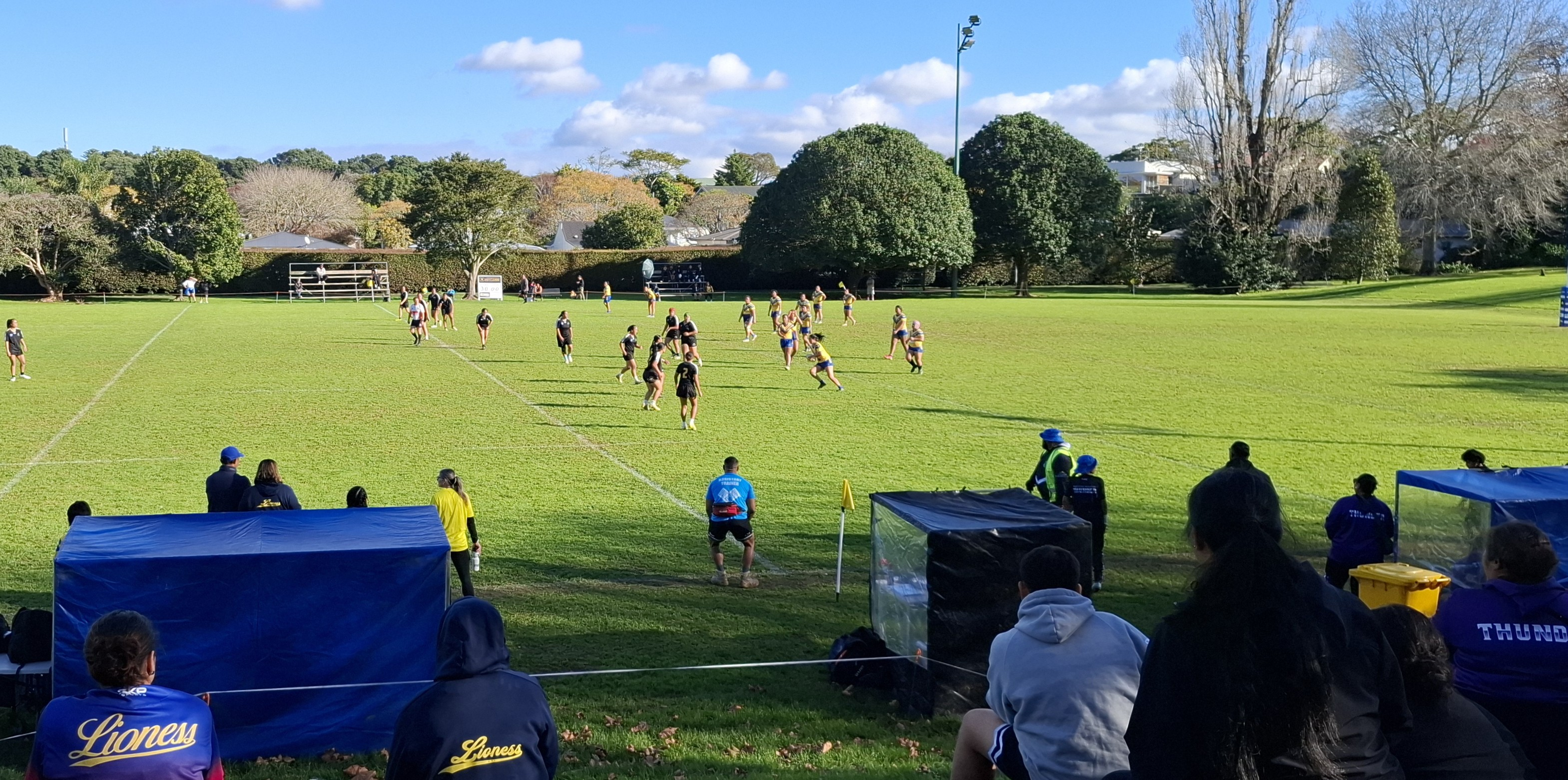
Johreena Sekene carrying the ball for Mt Albert.

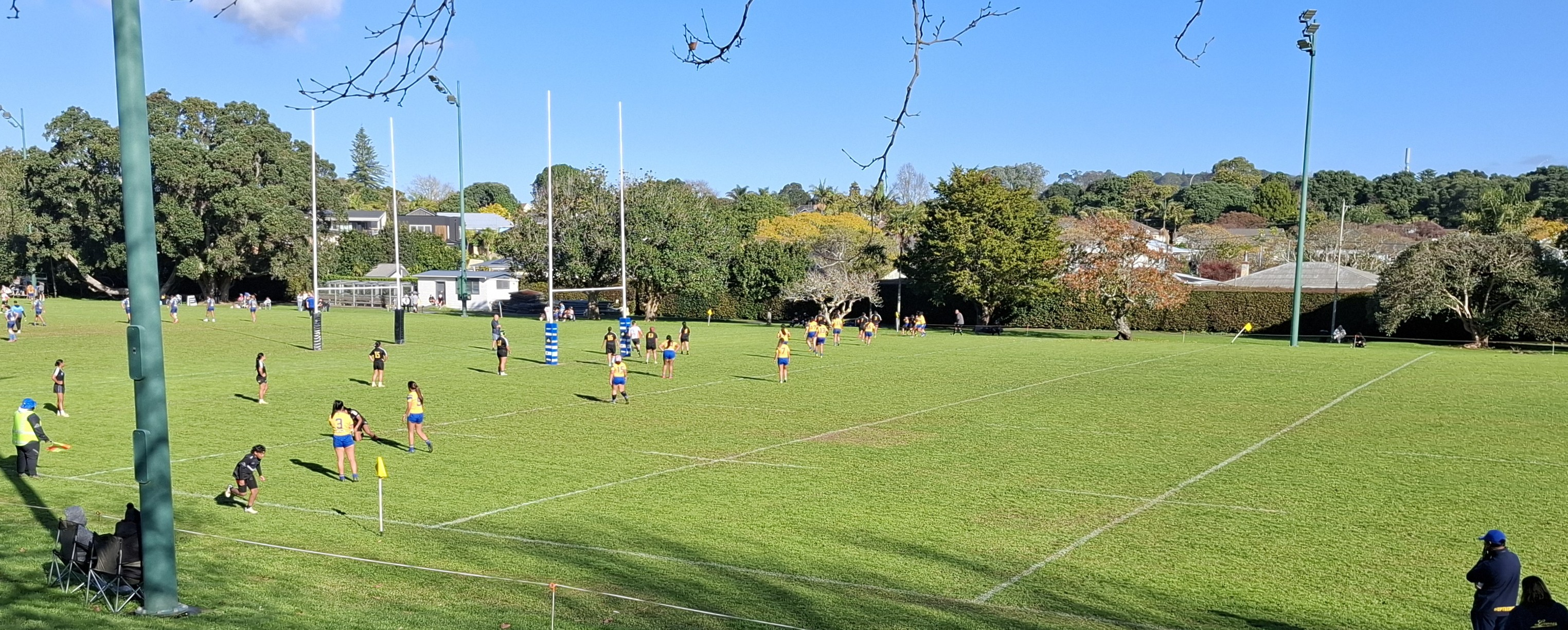
Joana Waqa scoring for Mt Albert in the 74th minute.

Mt Albert dominated the first half of their match with Manukau, leading 20-0 at halftime and 34-0 when Joana Waqa was on the end of the backline shift to score in the 74th minute, before Manukau scored their only points of the game when Moonlight Moala dummied and went over in the last minute and May Fueina Sasa converting. Many of Mt Albert's tries came from close range following Manukau errors. For Mt Albert, Kiera-Marie Sekene and Johreena Sekene both scored doubles with Sekene's second coming after an intercept and 20 metre run early in the second half. Otahuhu ran out comfortable 36-0 winners over Manurewa after doubling their 18-0 lead from halftime. They had six different try scorers with the competitions leading point scorer Tiana Thomson converting all of them.

13 June	Mt Albert Lionesses	34-6 (20-0)	Manukau Women	Fowlds Park 1, Morningside
12:45	Try: Kiera-Marie Sekene 2 (4m, 51m), Keri Ratima (9m), Mafi Faukafa (15m), Johreena Sekene 2 (25m, 46m), Joana Waqa (74m); Con: Kiera-Marie Sekene (6m, 16m, 52m)		Try: May Fueina Sasa (80m); Con: Moonlight Moala (80m)	Referee: Corey Jull

13 June	Mangere East Women	26-18 (12-8)	Richmond Roses	Walter Massey Park 1, Māngere
2:30	Try: Elispeta Gale (1m), Sophie-Lee Uta'atu (37m), Betsy Fifita (48m), Elenoa Havea (59m), Tonga Toutai (74m); Con: Akeliana-Faith Leauga 3/5 (2m, 38m, 49m)		Try: Ella Bussey-Timo (15m), Riley Pasese (33m), Mikayla Suluape 2 (53m, 69m); Con: Aleisha Taylor (70m)	Referee: Kahi Thompson

13 June	Otahuhu Women	36-0 (18-0)	Manurewa Women	Bert Henham Park 1, Ōtāhuhu
2:30	Try: Lourdes Tuiala (1m), Jor-El Loto (13m), Onjeurlina Hunt (36m), Charlize Cairns (44m), Wendy Savieti (52m), Georgia Wharton-Benedict (70m); Con: Tiana Thomson 6/6 (2m, 14m, 37m, 46m, 54m, 71m)			Referee: Saane Mosaati

===== Round 9 =====
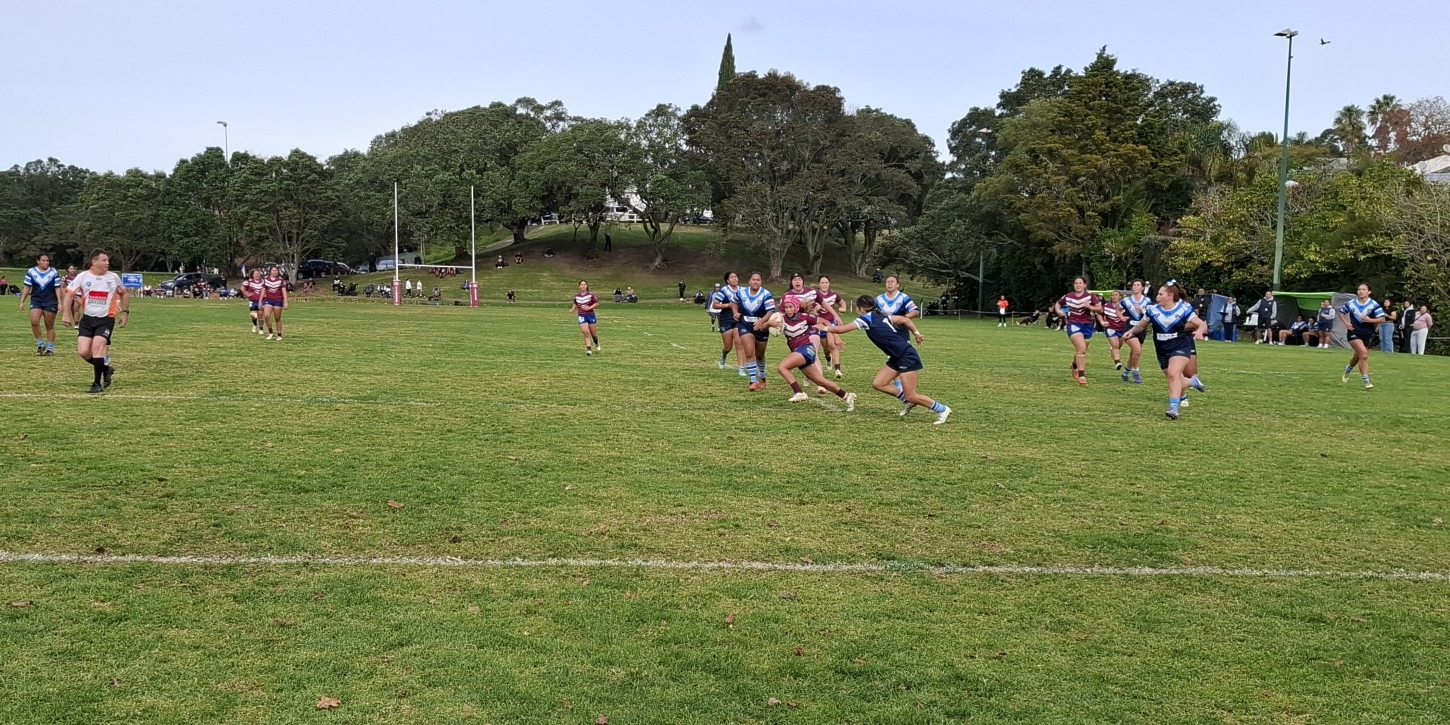
Mele Hemaloto about to score under the posts for Richmond.

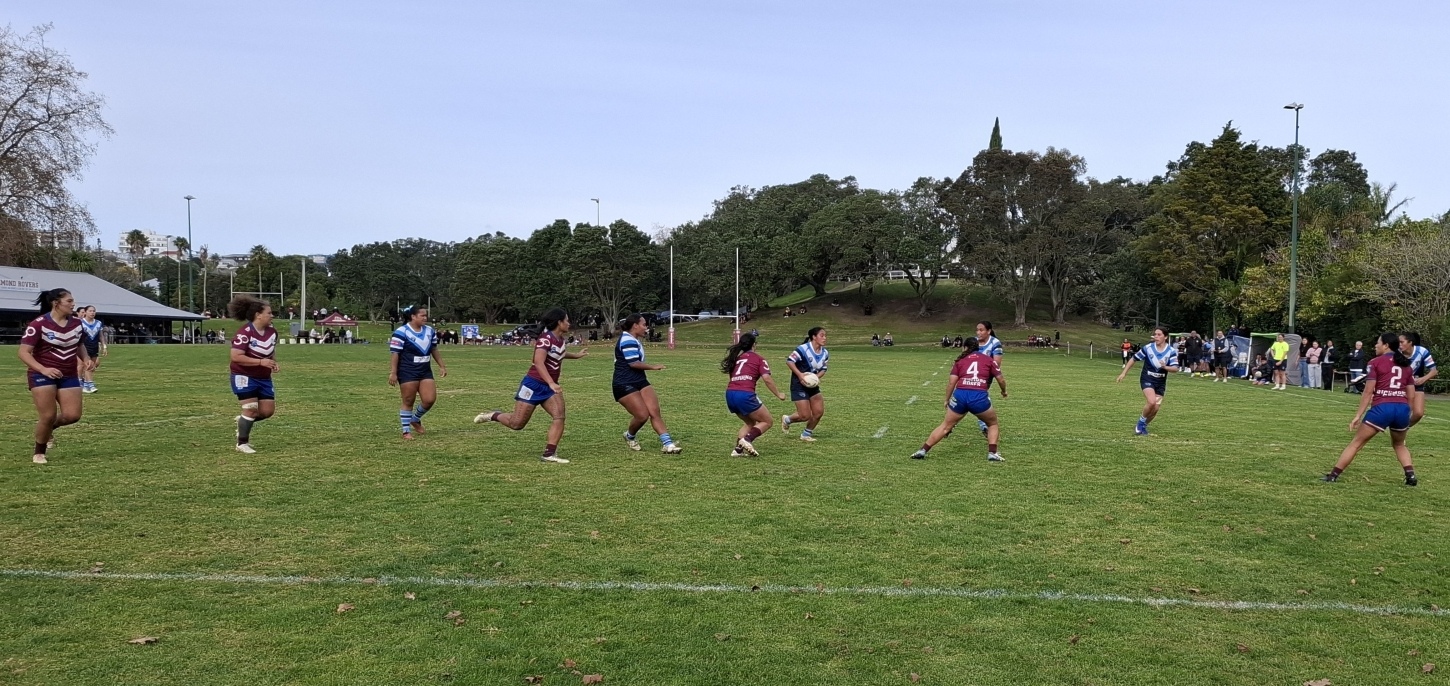
Otahuhu attacking early in the second half at Grey Lynn Park.

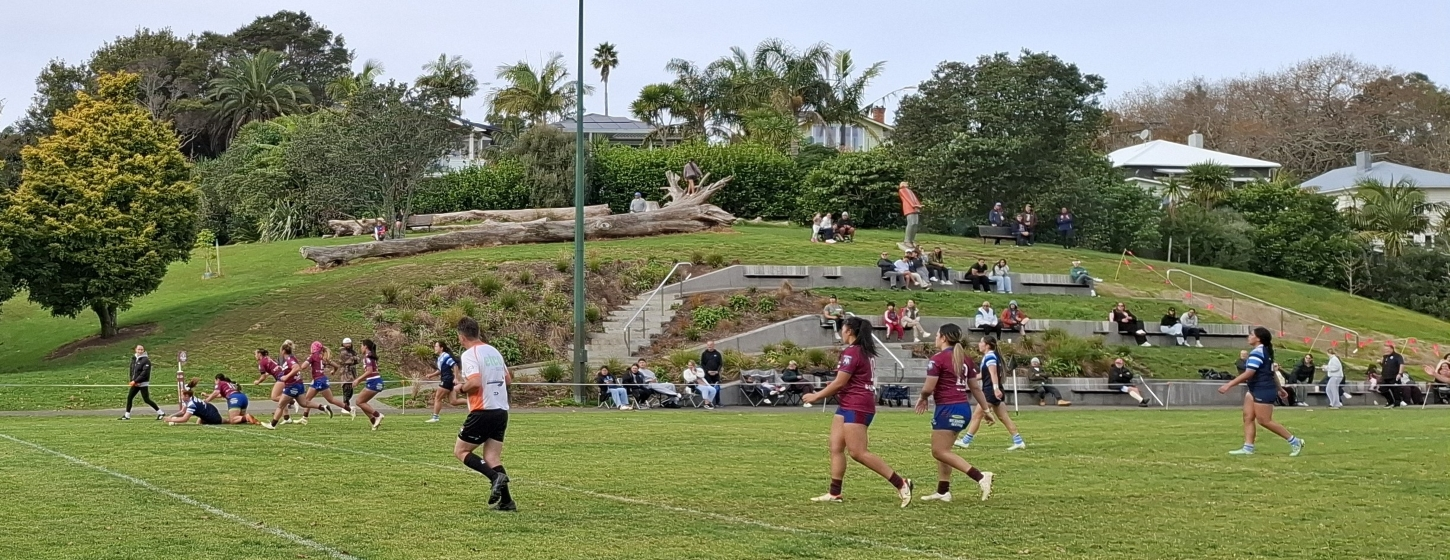
Dayna Moon scoring for Otahuhu to make the score 16-6.

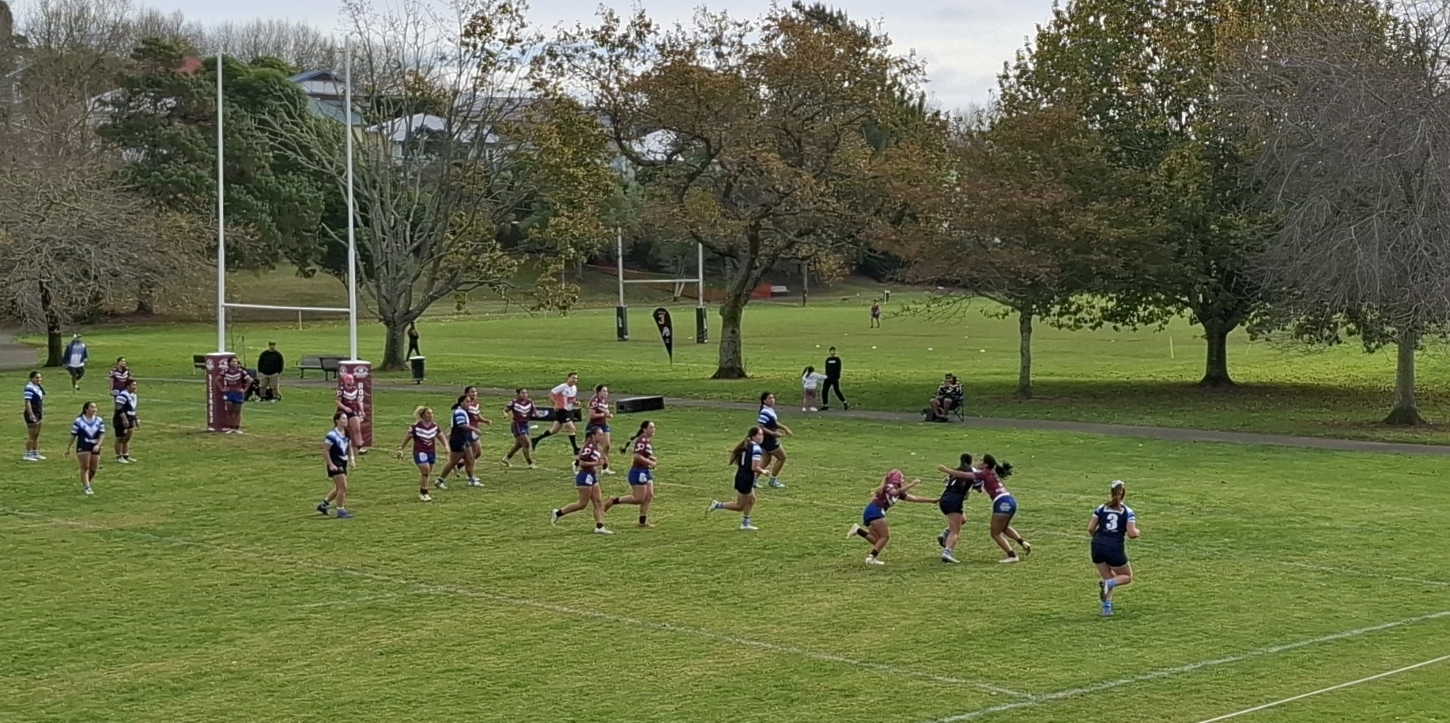
Georgia Wharton-Benedict crashing over to give Otahuhu a 20-6 lead.

Otahuhu beat Richmond Roses 24-10 at Grey Lynn Park in a physical match. Dayna Moon scored a double for Otahuhu, the second after finishing a back line shift in the corner early in the second half. Richmond trailed 12-0 after as many minutes with Moon scoring and then Tiana Thomson scored soon after and converted both tries. Richmond responded when Mele Hemaloto scored a brilliant individual try from 30 metres out when she went through a hole and beat the full back to score under the posts to narrow the score to 12-6. However two tries to Otahuhu pushed their lead back out.

20 June	Manurewa	30-6 (10-6)	Manukau	Mountfort Park: Jack Shelly Field, Manurewa
12:45	Try: Freesia Pokaia 2 (15m, 27m), Mikayla Kalolo 2 (41m, 56m), Amber Kani (61m), Alexis Thompson (79m); Con: Platinum Marsters 3 (17m, 58m, 63m)		Try: Litia Valu (6m); Con: Moonlight Moala (8m)	Referee: Poriau Uamaki

20 June	Richmond	10-24 (6-12)	Otahuhu	Grey Lynn Park 2, Grey Lynn
12:45	Try: Mele Hemaloto (34m), Luisa Kuli (80m); Con: Mikayla Suluape (35m)		Try: Dayna Moon 2 (8m, 44m), Tiana Thomson (12m), Georgia Wharton-Benedict (52m), Monica Samita (79m); Con: Tiana Thomson 2/5 (10m, 13m)	Referee: Corey Jull

20 June	Mt Albert	36-16 (26-8)	Mangere East	Fowlds Park 1, Morningside
2:30	Try: Joana Waqa (13m), Te Aroha Neal 2 (18m, 69m), Keri Ratima (22m), Alexus Alo (26m), Kiera-Marie Sekene (36m), Johreena Sekene (45m); Con: Kiera-Marie Sekene 4 (19m, 27m, 37m, 47m)		Try: Akeliana-Faith Leauga (2m), Mele Kaufusi (30m), Elenoa Havea (50m), Betsy Fifita (73m)	Referee: Ngaone Sefo

===== Round 10 =====
Otahuhu comfortably beat Mt Albert Lionesses 48-0 at Bert Jenham Park. Onjeurlina Hunt scored twice while Dayna Moon ran in three consecutive tries for them. Tiana Thomson converted five of their eight tries. Richmond's loss all but confirmed Otahuhu as the minor premiers with just four games remaining they were now eight competition points clear of second with just five games left. Manukau beat Mangere East 38-30 after leading 30-12 at halftime. The Hawks opened the scoring when Emmerson Garrett scored the first of her four tries in the 2nd minute. Manukau moved out to a 34-12 lead before Mangere East scored four tries to reduce the deficit. Goal kicker Akeliana-Faith Lauga struggled with most kicks from wide angles and only converted one of their seven tries while Moonlight Moala faired little better kicking three from eight. Manurewa won a close game against the Richmond Roses at Mountfort Park 30-24 after three tries in the last 18 minutes. They led 18-12 at halftime before a Jayne Feterika try put them level 18-all following Mikayla Suluape's conversion. Amber Kani then scored her second try for the Marlins and Mikayla Kalolo gave them an important 26-18 lead. Demielle Onesemo-Tuilaepa gave the Richmond Roses hope when she scored in the 71st minute and Heidi Aranui's conversion narrowed the score to 26-24, however on full time Jodeci Joseph put the game beyond doubt. For the winners Kani and Freesia Pokaia both scored doubles while Platinum Marsters had an off day with the boot converting just one from six. For Richmond Mikayla Suluapa converted three tries and scored one, while Heidi Aranui converted their last try.

27 June	Otahuhu Women	42-0 (10-0)	Mt Albert Lionesses	Bert Henham Park, Ōtāhuhu
12:45	Try: Onjeurlina Hunt 2 (19m, 74m), Dayna Moon 3 (33m, 48m, 53m), Jor-El Loto (60m), Lourdes Tuiala (64m), Mary Solovi (80m); Con: Tiana Thomson 5/8 (20m, 61m, 65m, 75m, 80m)			Referee: Saane Mosaati

27 June	Manukau Women	38-30 (30-12)	Mangere East Women	Moyle Park 1, Māngere
12:45	Try: Shaniah Lui (7m), Kimora-Lee Lakopo (12m), Poura Tetu (16m), Mya Tony (19m), Abigail Aukuso (24m), May Fueina Sasa (39m), Salaa Jasmine Apulu (48m), Derdrey Walker-Tuiletufuga (57m); Con: Moonlight Moala (17m, 20m, 40m)		Try: Emmerson Garrett 4 (2m, 30m, 34m, 71m), Kyla Lynch-Brown 2 (52m, 62m), Gedaliah Pulupaki (80m); Con: Akeliana-Faith Leauga (53m)	Referee: Maxine Godinet

27 June	Manurewa Women	30-24 (18-12)	Richmond Roses	Mountfort Park: Jack Shelley Field, Manurewa
2:30	Try: Maitua Feterika (2m), Freesia Pokaia 2 (11m, 36m), Amber Kani 2 (23m, 62m), Mikayla Kalolo (67m), Jodeci Joseph (80m); Con: Platinum Marsters 1/6 (3m), Freesia Pokaia 0/1		Try: Mikayla Suluape (17m), Luisa Kuli (32m), Jayne Feterika (45m), Demielle Onesemo-Tuilaepa (71m); Con: Mikayla Suluape 3/3 (18m, 34m, 47m), Heidi Aranui 1/1 (72m)	Referee: Kahi Thompson

===== Round 11 =====
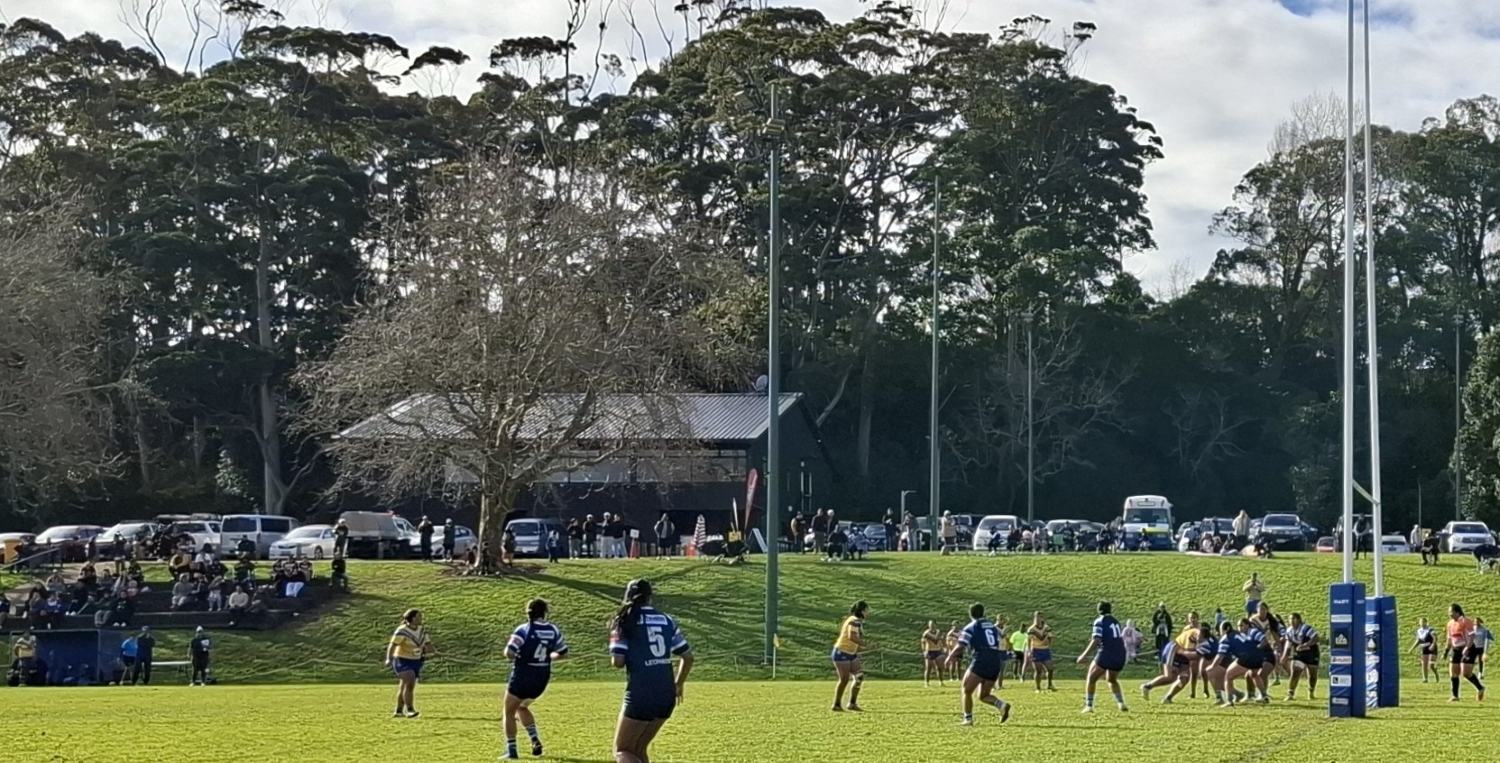
Fusiloa Sefo scoring for Mount Albert.

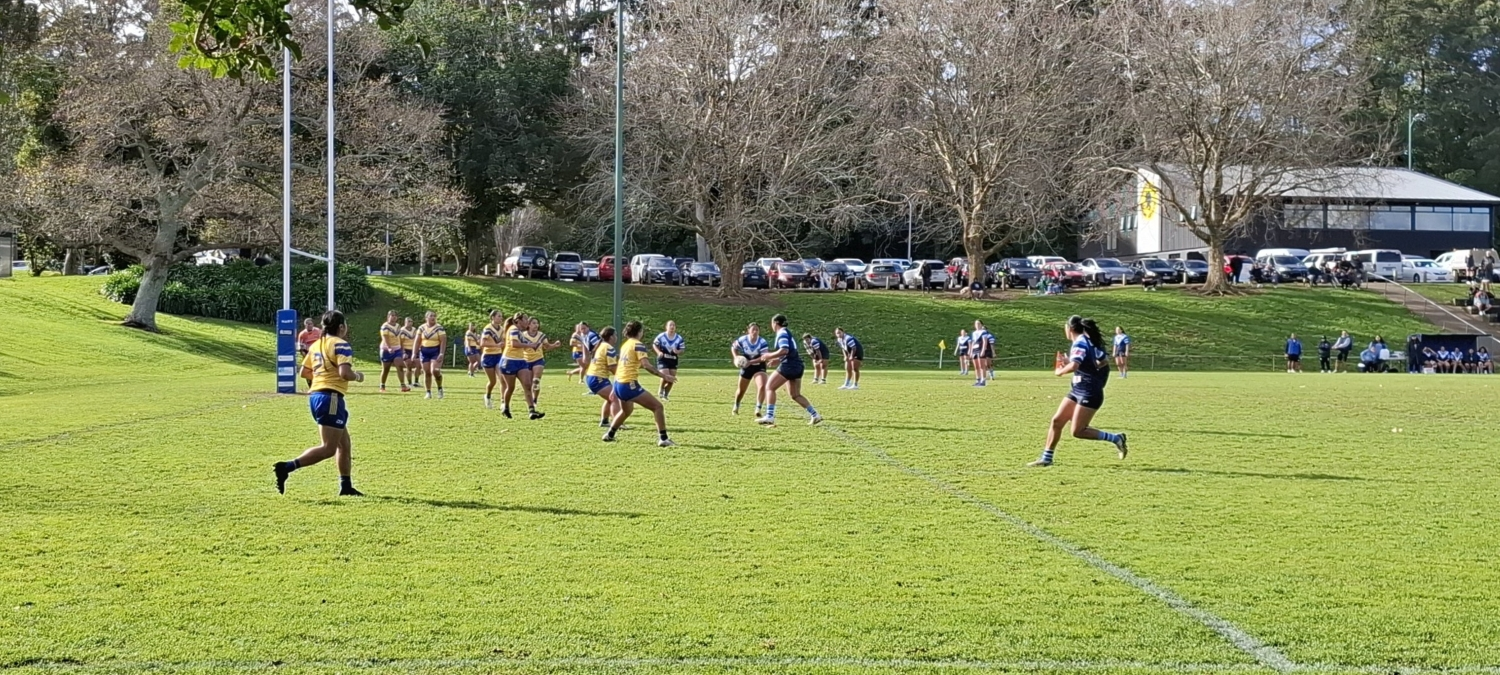
Otahuhu attacking.

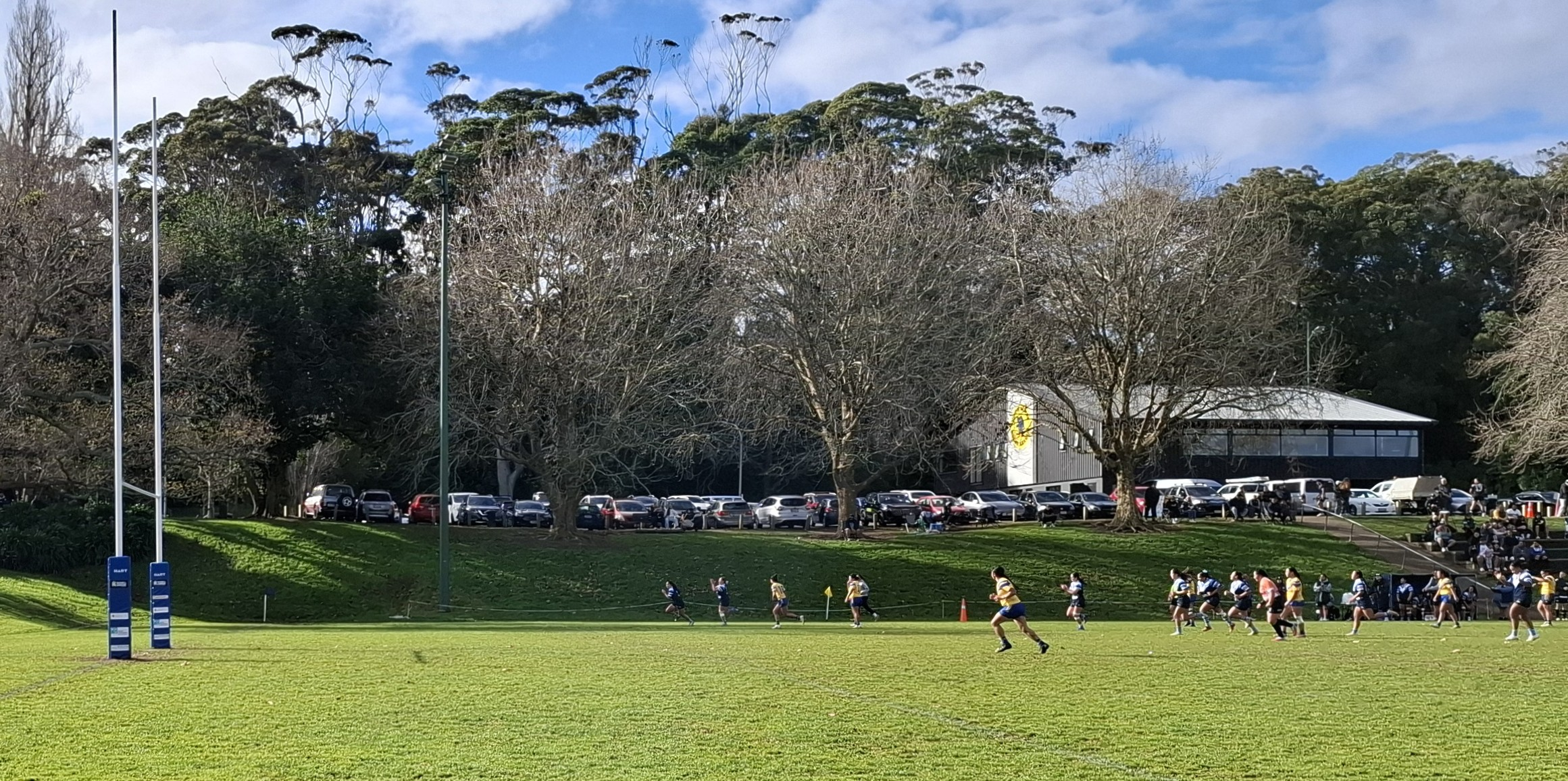
Dayna Moon running in a try after a mix up by Mount Albert players fielding a kick.

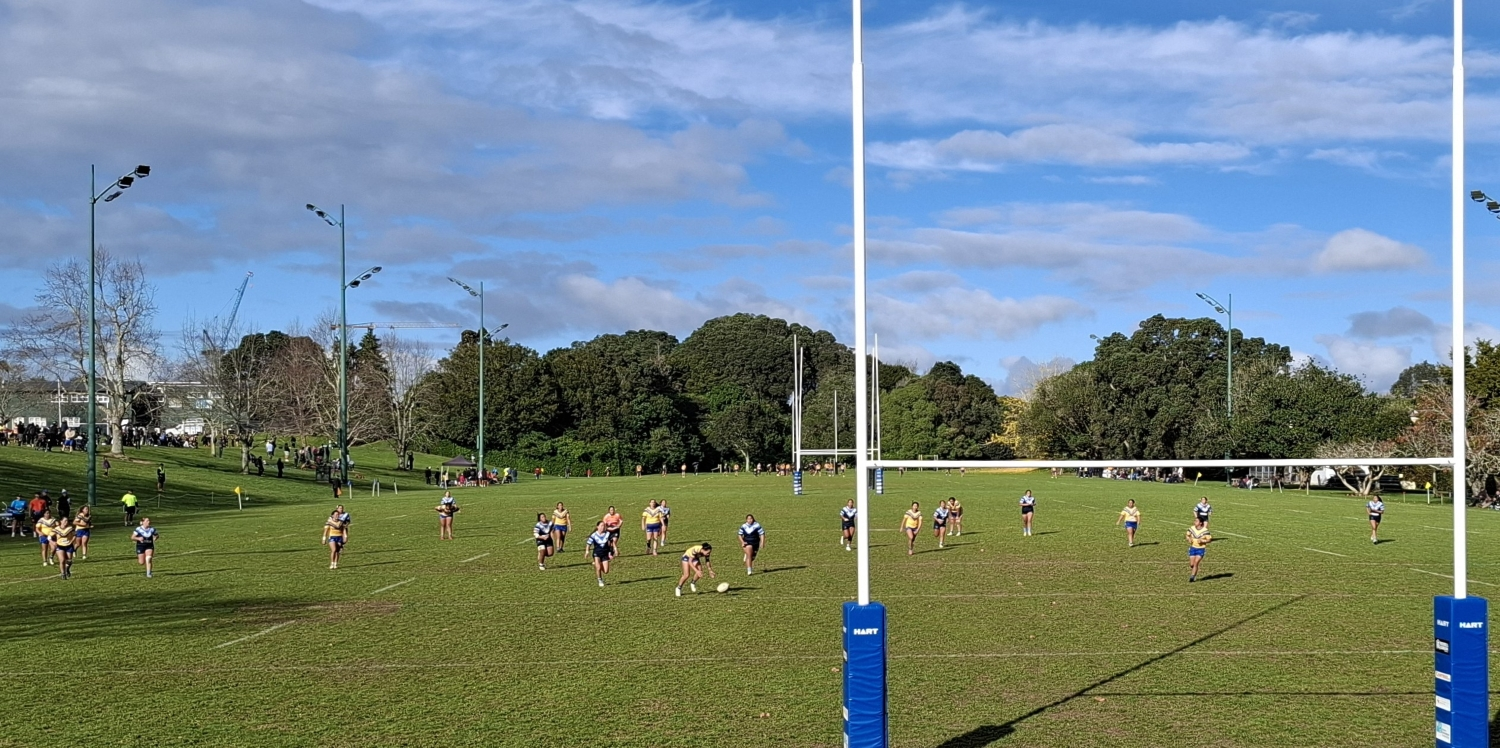
Mount Albert full back Ocean Tierney fielding a kick near the end of the match.

4 July	Manukau Women	26-34 (16-10)	Richmond Roses	Moyle Park 1, Māngere
12:45	Try: Abigail Akaroa (11m), Josinah Filisi Tauliili 2 (16m, 69m), May Fueina Sasa (36m), Moonlight Moala (63m); Con: Moonlight Moala 3/5 (12m, 17m, 71m)		Try: Harmony Ioane (7m), Natalia Hickling (21m), Felila Kia (41m), Luisa Kuli 2 (46m, 52m), Genesis Atai (49m); Con: Aleisha Taylor 1/2 (22m), Natalia Hickling 4/4 (42m, 47m, 51m, 54m)	Referee: Davey Misileki

4 July	Mt Albert Lionesses	22-26 (6-20)	Otahuhu Women	Fowlds Park 1, Morningside
12:45	Try: Kiera-Marie Sekene 2 (14m, 46m), Fusilua Sefo 2 (55m, 71m); Con: Kiera-Marie Sekene 3/4 (16m, 47m, 56m)		Try: Tiana Thomson (7m), Dayna Moon 2 (19m, 35m), Mary Solovi (40m), Georgia Wharton-Benedict (63m); Con: Tiana Thomson 3/5 (9m, 43m, 64m)	Attendance: 200; Referee: Maxine Godinet

4 July	Manurewa Women	28-32 (6-24)	Mangere East Women	Mountfort Park: Jack Shelly Field, Manurewa
12:45	Try: Latesha Mitchener (31m), MJ Finau (42m), Jayden Rogers 2 (67m, 71m), Maitua Feteriki (74m); Con: Platinum Marsters 4/5 (32m, 44m, 69m, 75m)		Try: Emmerson Garrett (2m), Jael Sefo (15m), Faith Tavita 2 (20m, 49m), Moanalemalama Uiese (35m), Akeliana Faith-Leauga (40m), Elenoa Havea (57m); Con: Akeliana Faith-Leauga 2/6 (36m, 40m)	Referee: Saane Mosaati

===== Round 12 =====
11 July	Mangere East Women	24-16 (12-10)	Mt Albert Lionesses	Walter Massey Park 1, Māngere
12:45	Try: Moanalemalama Uiese (5m), Asha Taumoepeau-Williams 2 (23m, 73m), Chrisena Nathan (38m), Elenoa Havea 2 (41m, 79m)		Try: Te Aroha Neal (9m), Anastacia Afu (29m), Kiera-Marie Sekene (64m); Con: Kiera-Marie Sekene (30m, 64m)

11 July	Otahuhu Women	34-22 (14-12)	Manukau Women	Bert Henham Park 1, Ōtāhuhu
12:45	Try: Georgina-Louise Smalley (12m), Jor-El Loto (16m), George Wharton-Benedict 2 (31m, 66m), Jeyla Ropati (57m), Alaina Lauitiiti (62m), Alyssa Malamatenios (72m); Con: Lourdes Tuiala 3 (17m, 64m, 67m)		Try: Josinah Filisi Tauliili 2 (23m, 38m), Poura Tetu (44m), La'ie Potoru-Rokeni (80m); Con: Moonlight Moala 3 (24m, 39m, 80m)

11 July	Richmond Roses	22-24 (18-6)	Manurewa Women	Grey Lynn Park 2, Grey Lynn
2:30	Try: Luisa Kuli 2 (23m, 39m), Felila Kia (35m), Casey-Lee Toese (44m); Con: Mikayla Suluape 3 (24m, 36m, 40m)		Try: Alexis Thompson (18m), Freesia Pokaia (49m), Maitua Feterika (64m), Ricshay Lemanu (79m), Platinum Marsters (80m); Con: Platinum Marsters 2/5 (19m, 50m)

===== Round 13 =====
18 July	Richmond Roses	18-44 (14-24)	Mangere East Women	Grey Lynn Park 2, Grey Lynn
12:45	Try: Maeva Atatoa Carr (1m), Riley Pasese 2 (11m, 60m), Natalia Hickling (28m); Con: Natalia Hickling (29m)		Try: Mele Kaufusi (14m), Faith Tavita (20m), Asha Williams 2 (23m, 53m), Moanalemalama Uiese (38m), Kyla Lynch-Brown 2 (67m, 76m), Elenoa Havea (73m); Con: Elenoa Havea 6/8 (15m, 22m, 25m, 39m, 68m, 78m)	Referee: Davey Misileki

18 July	Manurewa Women	14-48 (4-30)	Otahuhu Women	Mountfort Park: Jack Shelly Field, Manurewa
12:45	Try: Monica Tuala-Leaunoa (24m), Jayralee Tonga (71m), Monica Tuala-Leaunoa (76m); Con: Platinum Marsters 1/3 (71m)		Try: Fakama Thomas (4m), Lourdes Tuiala 3 (8m, 34m, 54m), Jeyla Ropati 2 (11m, 53m), Ania Morgan (29m), Alyssa Malamatenios 2 (40m, 64m), Teau Maui (80m); Con: Tiana Thomson 4 (4m, 9m, 35m, 53m)	Attendance: 200; Referee: Saane Mosaati

18 July	Mt Albert Lionesses	18-52 (18-18)	Manukau Women	Fowlds Park 1, Morningside
2:30	Try: Te Aroha Neal (3m), Keri Ratima (15m), Sharelle Leota (35m), Mafi Faukafa (40m); Con: Kiera-Marie Sekene (16m)		Try: Josinah Filisi Tauiliili 2 (7m, 78m), Dedrey Walker-Tuiletufuga (18m), Abigail Akaroa 2 (27m, 56m), Mya Tony (32m), Poura Tetu 2 (41m, 51m), Abigail Sharon Aukuso (47m), Le-Sinatapuitea Elikapo (74m); Con: Josinah Filisi-Tauiliili 6/10 (33m, 42m, 48m, 57m, 75m, 79m)	Referee: Maxine Godinet

===== Round 14 =====
25 July	Manukau Women	12-26 (12-16)	Manurewa Women	Mountfort Park: Jack Shelly Field, Manurewa
12:45	Try: May Fueina Sasa (14m), Josinah Filisi Tauliili (27m); Con: Moonlight Moala 2/2 (16m, 28m)		Try: Lavinia Tauhalaliku (2m), Amber Kani (21m), Maitua Feterika (31m), Jonesha Katipa-Blakelock (53m), Krystal Rota (80m); Con: Platinum Marsters 3/5 (22m, 32m, 54m)	Attendance: 200; Referee: Saane Mosaati

25 July	Otahuhu Women	54-16 (28-4)	Mangere East Women	Bert Henham Park, Ōtāhuhu
12:45	Try: Dayna Moon 3 (4m, 8m, 21m), Jor-El Loto (25m), Tiana Thomson (30m), Monica Samita 2 (36m, 62m), Alaina Lauitiiti (49m), Ania Morgan (65m), Onjeurlina Hunt (74m), Alyssa Malamatenios (78m); Con: Tiana Thomson 4/10 (26m, 31m, 50m, 79m), Jonsal Tautari 1/1 (75m)		Try: Akeliana-Faith Leauga (17m), Mele Kaufusi (53m), Odesza Toia (59m); Con: Elenoa Havea 2/3 (54m, 59m)	Attendance: 150; Referee: Corey Jull

25 July	Richmond Roses	36-22 (18-14)	Mt Albert Lionesses	Grey Lynn Park 2, Grey Lynn
2:30	Try: Luisa Kuli 3 (23m, 31m, 70m), Mikayla Suluape (34m), Aleisha Taylor (55m), Heidi Aranui (66m); Con: Mikayla Suluape 6/6 (29m, 32m, 36m, 57m, 68m, 71m)		Try: Keri Ratima 4 (8m, 40m, 42m, 62m), Jewel Bowen (13m), Con: Kiera-Marie Sekene 1/5 (14m)	Attendance: 100; Referee: Maxine Godinet

===== Round 15 =====
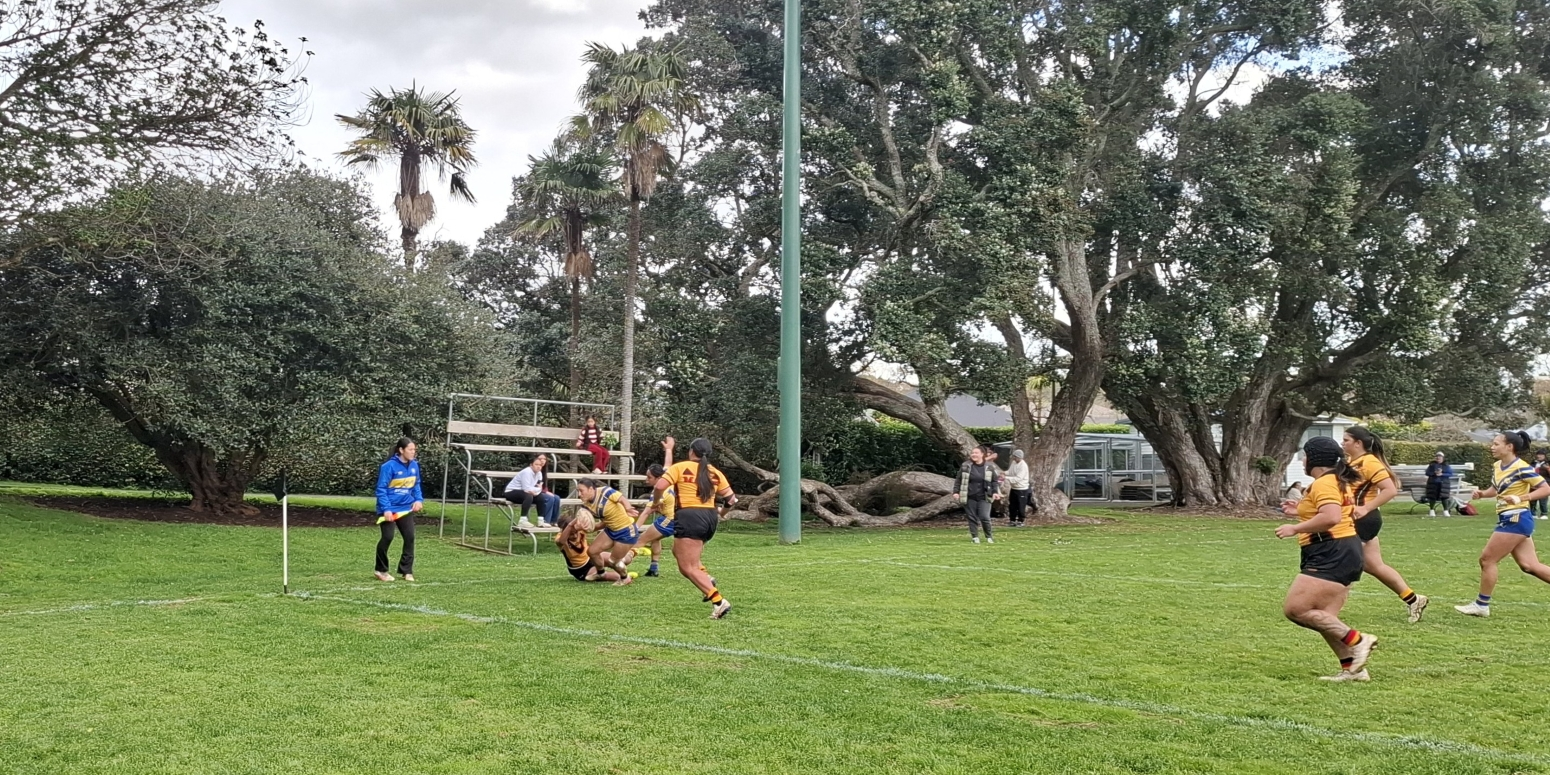
Keri Ratima scoring for Mt Albert against Manurewa.

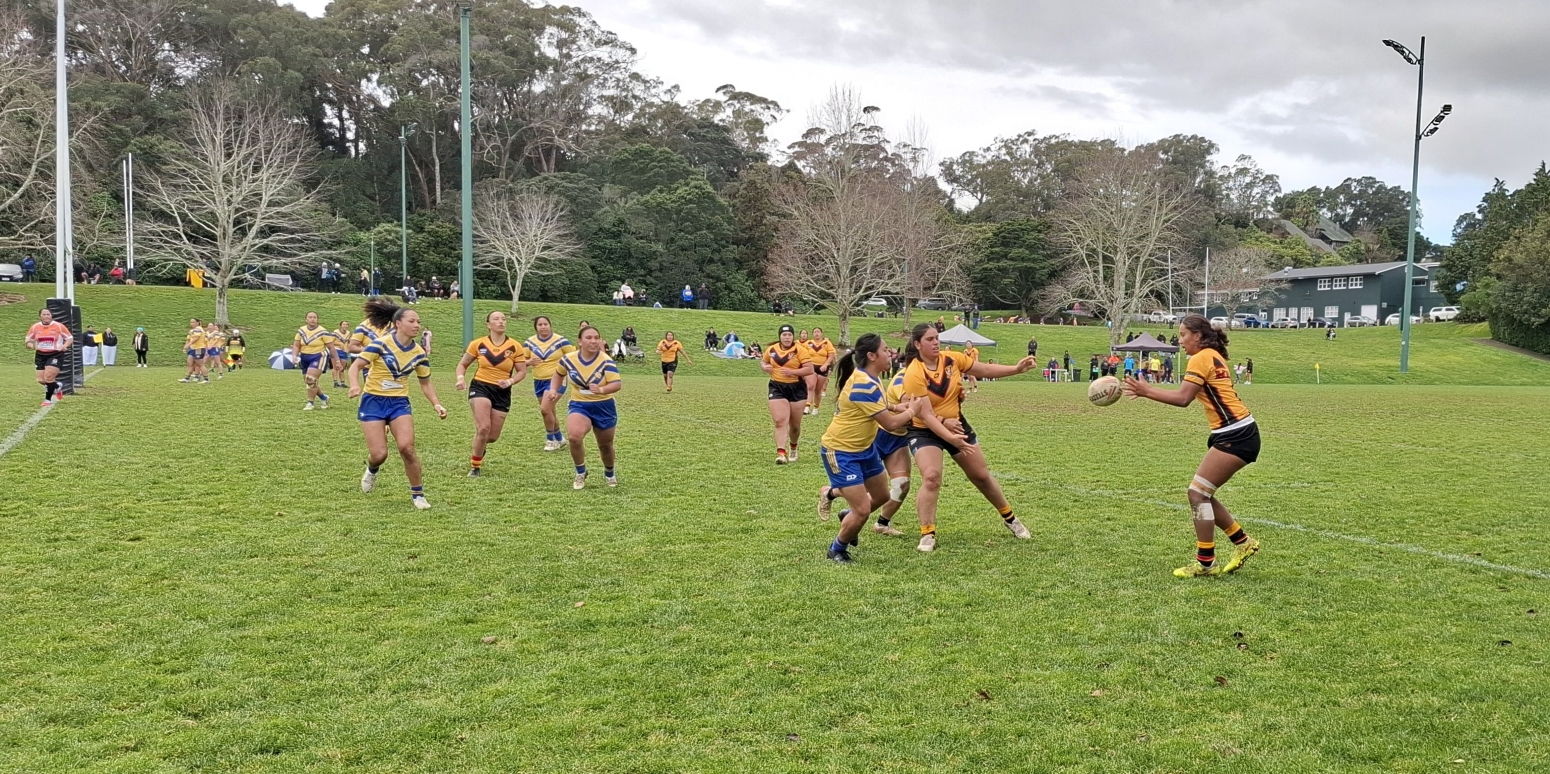
Manurewa attacking in the second half against Mt Albert.

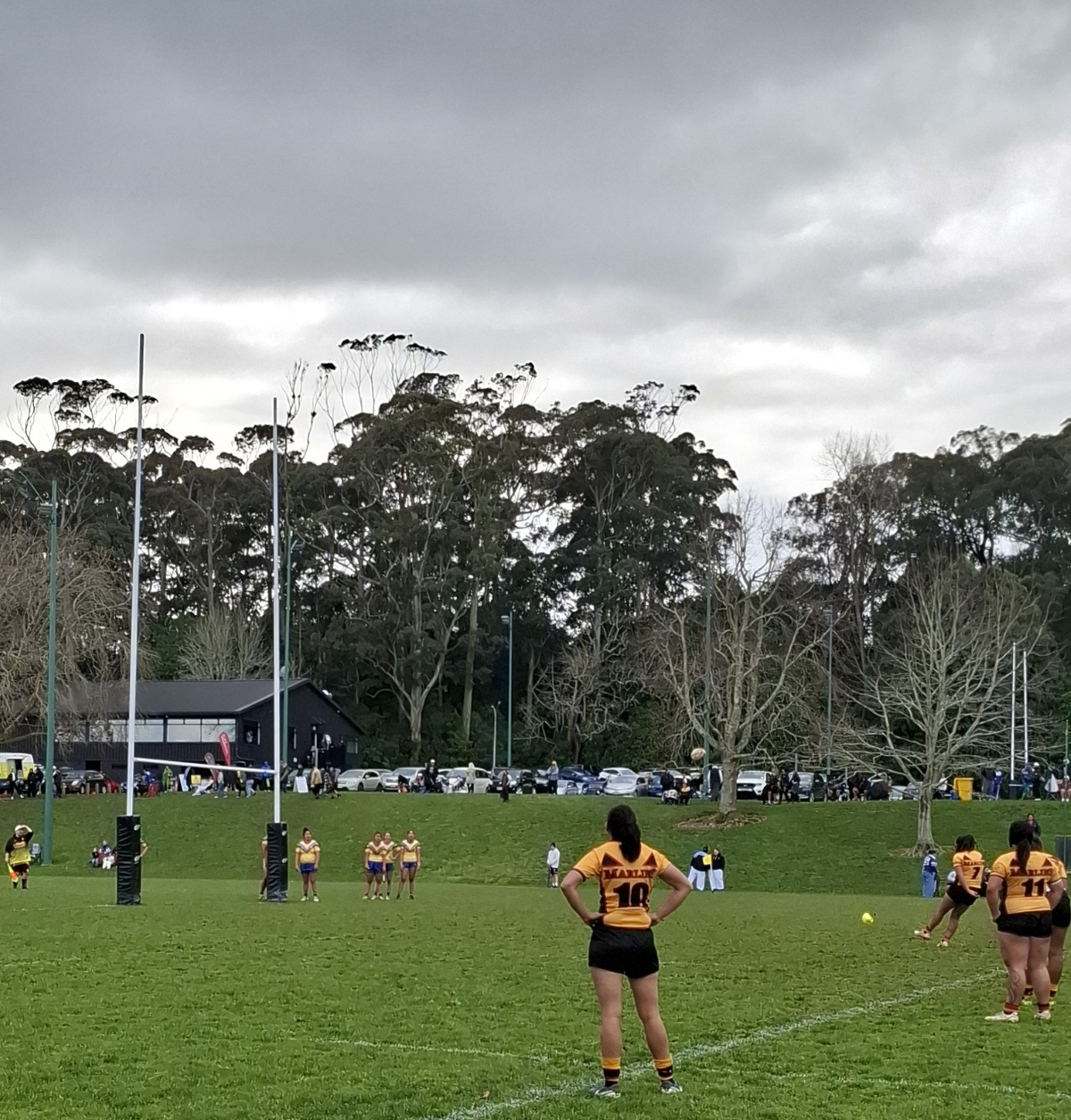
Platinum Marsters kicking a penalty after the full time siren to win the game for Manurewa 16-14.

1 August	Mt Albert Lionesses	14-16 (4-8)	Manurewa Women	Fowlds Park 1, Morningside
12:45	Try: Mafi Faukafa 2 (10m, 69m), Keri Ratima (60m); Con: Kiera-Marie Sekene 1/3 (70m)		Try: Mollie Tagaloa (2m), Jodeci Joseph (15m), Platinum Marsters (49m); Con: Platinum Marsters 1/3 (51m); Pen: Platinum Marsters 1/1 (78m)	Attendance: 100; Referee: Maxine Godinet

1 August	Mangere East Women	52-18 (12-18)	Manukau Women	Walter Massey Park 1, Māngere
12:45	Try: Asha Taumoepeau-Williams 2 (13m, 76m), Emmerson Garrett 3 (25m, 30m, 52m), Faith Tavita 4 (43m, 55m, 58m, 61m), Kyla Lynch-Brown (67m), Victoria Cocker 2 (46m, 71m), Betsy Fifita (64m); Con: Akeliana-Faith Leauga 0/2, Elenoa Havea 0/2, Asha Taumoepeau-Williams 0/2, Kalonika Kala Fifita 0/1, Betsy Fifita 0/2, Faith Tavita 0/1, Emmerson Garrett 0/2, Odesza Toia 0/1		Try: Mya Tony (6m, 38m), Josinah Filisi Tauliili (17m); Con: Moonlight Moala 3/3 (7m, 18m, 40m)	Attendance: 100; Referee: Poriau Uamaki

1 August	Otahuhu Women	50-6 (18-6)	Richmond Roses	Bert Henham Park 1, Ōtāhuhu
12:45	Try: Alaina Lauitiiti 2 (4m, 72m), Onjeurlina Hunt 3 (10m, 33m, 44m), Lourdes Tuiala (14m), Monica Samita (48m), Tiana Thomson 2 (53m, 76m), Dayna Moon (61m); Con: Tiana Thomson 5/10 (34m, 49m, 62m, 78m, 77m)		Try: Demielle Onesemo-Tuilaepa (26m); Con: Mikayla Suluapa 1/1 (27m)	Attendance: 150; Referee: Keven Ah-Ken

===== Playoffs =====
====== Semi Finals ======
8 August	Otahuhu Women	36-10 (14-4)	Richmond Roses	Bert Henham Park 1, Ōtāhuhu
12:45	Try: Alaina Lauitiiti (21m), Shalom Setu-Veve 2 (24m, 37m), Alyssa Malamatenios (43m), Jeyla Ropati (46m), Lourdes Tuiala (60m), Dayna Moon 2 (67m, 78m); Con: Tiana Thomson 2/8 (25m, 62m)		Try: Harmony Ioane (31m), Pauline Morris-Ponga (64m); Con: Mikayla Suluape 1/2 (65m)	Attendance: 150; Referee: Maxine Godinet, TJ's: Kahi Thompson & Nigel Williams

8 August	Manurewa Women	22-30 (14-4)	Mangere East Women	Mountfort Park: Jack Shelly Field, Manurewa
2:30	Try: Mikayla Kalolo (25m), Carnetra Nathan (41m), Amber Kani 2 (70m, 80m); Con: Platinum Marsters 3/4 (43m, 71m, 80m)		Try: Elenoa Havea 2 (7m, 66m), Asha Taumoepeau-Williams 2 (13m, 53m), Mele Kaufusi (16m), Tonga Toutai (61m), Emmerson Garrett (75m); Con: Elenoa Havea 1/4 (17m), Akeliana-Faith Leauga 0/3	Attendance: 200; Referee: Keven Ah-Ken, TJ's: Poriau Uamaki & Saane Mosaati

====== Grand Final ======
Otahuhu won an even contest which saw both teams trading tries throughout the match. The Leopards opened the scoring when former New Zealand Warriors W player (2018-19), Onjeurlina Hunt, ran hard through the defence to score close to the posts with Tiana Thomson converting. Betsy Fifita replied for Mangere East when she shaped to pass left from dummy half but ran and scored to the left of the posts with prop Elenoa Havea converting to level the scores. The Hawks took the lead when they moved the ball to the left edge and Tonga Toutai planted the ball over the line in a tackle. Havea slotted the conversion from the touchline to give the Hawks a six point lead. Otahuhu struck back when they got on attack and kept the ball alive on the last tackle before Dayna Moon dived over in the right corner. The conversion missed and then Mangere East moved further in front when former Sydenham Swan, Kyla Lynch-Brown went over from dummy half. In a similar effort to their second Otahuhu kept the ball alive as it went through several hands and then Teau Maui drove over. Thomson's conversion from a difficult angle leveled the scores at 16-16 after 35 minutes and the score remained that way until the half time break. Otahuhu retook the lead five minutes into the second half with Dayna Moon scoring her second try to bring her season tally to 18. They doubled their lead seven minutes later when Teau Maui crashed over in a three woman tackle and Thomson's conversion took them to a 26-16 lead. Mangere struck back when they made a break and then Akeliana-Faith Leauga went over from dummy half after a quick play the ball. With 8 minutes remaining Mangere East made a break from their own half with Asha Taumoepeau-Williams running 35 metres. Two tackles later Faith Tevita went in on the right edge to tie the match 26-26. In the closing stages of the match Otahuhu got on attack and received a penalty close to the line. Following a tap they settled play and then Alaina Lauitiiti was held up over the line, but from the play the ball Jonsal Tautari put in a left foot kick which Jeyla Ropati won the race to the ball and scored the winning try. Tiana Thompson converted from wide out to make the score 32-26. Both teams exchanged sets but Mangere East missed a golden opportunity to score in the left corner before Otahuhu wound the clock down to secure the Steele-Shanks Premiership.

16 August	Otahuhu Women	32-26 (16-16)	Mangere East Women	North Harbour Stadium 1, Albany
12:45	Try: Onjeurlina Hunt (4m), Dayna Moon 2 (21m, 44m), Alaina Lautiiti (33m), Teau Maui (51m), Jeyla Ropati (74m); Con: Tiana Thomson 4/6 (6m, 35m, 53m, 75m)		Try: Betsy Fifita (8m), Tonga Toutai (12m), Kyla Lynch-Brown (24m), Akeliana-Faith Leauga (62m), Faith Tavita (70m); Con: Elenoa Havea 3/3 (9m, 13m, 63m), Akeliana-Faith Leauga 0/2	Attendance: 400; Referee: Keven Ah-Ken, TJ's: Maxine Godinet & Poriau Uamaki

Team details

FB	1	Lourdes Tuiala
WG	2	Jeyla Ropati
CE	3	Alyssa Malamatenios
CE	4	Georgia Wharton-Benedict
WG	5	Dayna Moon
SO	6	Monica Samita
HB	7	Tiana Thomson
PR	8	Onjeurlina Hunt (C)
HK	9	Nevaeh Henry
PR	10	Wendy Savieti
SR	11	Shalom Setu-Veve
SR	12	Teau Maui
LK	13	Jor-El Loto
Substitutes:
SB	14	Jonsal Tautari
SB	15	Alaina Lautiiti
SB	16	Tajtiana Araia
SB	17	Mary Solovi
SB	18	Tuputala Ufipoa
Head Coach: George Carmont
Assistant Coach: Letitia Taylor
Manager: Ana Silao
Assistant Manager: Tyla Harris-Lafaele

FB	1	Asha Taumoepeau-Williams
WG	2	Emmerson Garrett
CE	3	Faith Tavita
CE	4	Victoria Crocker
WG	5	Tonga Toutai
SO	6	Akeliana-Faith Leauga
HB	7	Kyla Lynch-Brown
PR	8	Odesza Toia
HK	9	Betsy Fifita
PR	10	Elenoa Havea
SR	11	Faryn Fitialo
SR	12	Maraea Toia
LK	13	Mele Kaufusi
Substitutes:
EM	14	Alyssa Vaha'akolo-Ngaika
SB	15	Peyton Leota
SB	16	Moanalemalama Uiese
SB	17	Kalonikakala Fifita
SB	18	Saili Uolo
Head Coach: Dave Rewi
Assistant Coach: Neville Ngaika
Manager: Valerie Lui

=== Full season top try scorers and point scorers ===
==== Full season top point scorers ====
Tiana Thomson, the Otahuhu halfback was the top scorer for the 2026 season with 150 from 7 tries, 60 conversions, and 1 penalty (61 goals from 111 attempts for a 54% success rate). She finished well ahead of Mikayla Suluapa who scored 108 points.

Top point scorers
No	Player	Team	T	C	P	DG	Pts
1	Tiana Thomson	Otahuhu	7	60	1	0	150
2	Mikayla Suluapa	Richmond	8	37	1	0	108
3	Kiera-Maria Sekene	Mt Albert	14	24	0	0	104
4	Platinum Marsters	Manurewa	3	39	1	0	92
5	Josinah Filisi Tauliili	Manukau	17	10	0	0	88
6	Dayna Moon	Otahuhu	18	0	0	0	72
7	Akeliana-Faith Leauga	Mangere East	6	18	0	0	60
8	Elenoa Havea	Otahuhu	9	12	0	0	60
9	Faith Tavita	Mangere East	14	0	0	0	56
10	Onjeurlina Hunt	Otahuhu	13	0	0	0	52

==== Full season top try scorers ====
The top try scorer was Dayna Moon, the winger for Otahuhu with 18 tries. She scored two tries in the grand final to over take Josinah Filisi Tauliili of Manukau who finished with 17.

Top try scorers
No	Player	Team	Tries
1	Dayna Moon	Otahuhu	18
2	Josinah Filisi Tauliili	Manukau	17
3=	Kiera-Marie Sekene	Mt Albert	14
3=	Faith Tavita	Mangere East	14
5	Onjeurlina Hunt	Otahuhu	13
6	Freesia Pokaia	Manurewa	12
7=	Luisa Kuli	Richmond	11
7=	Maitua Feterika	Manurewa	11
7=	Alaina Lautiiti	Otahuhu	11
10=	Keri Ratima	Mt Albert	9
10=	Emmerson Garrett	Mangere East	9
10=	Amber Kani	Manurewa	9
10=	Alaina Lautiiti	Otahuhu	9
10=	Lourdes Tuiala	Otahuhu	9

=== Sharman Cup ===
==== Standings ====
Team	Pld	W	D	L	F	A	PD	Pts
Hibiscus Coast Raiders	14	10	2	2	440	240	+200	22
Otara Scorpions	14	9	1	4	444	280	+164	19
Howick Hornets	14	8	0	6	300	260	+40	19
Manurewa Marlins	14	8	0	6	374	322	+52	16
Mangere East Hawks	14	6	1	7	302	354	-52	13
Te Atatu Roosters	14	4	2	8	300	323	-23	10
Glenora Bears	14	4	0	10	258	415	-157	8
Northcote Tigers	14	2	1	9	258	482	-224	5

==== Fixtures and Results ====
===== Round 1 =====
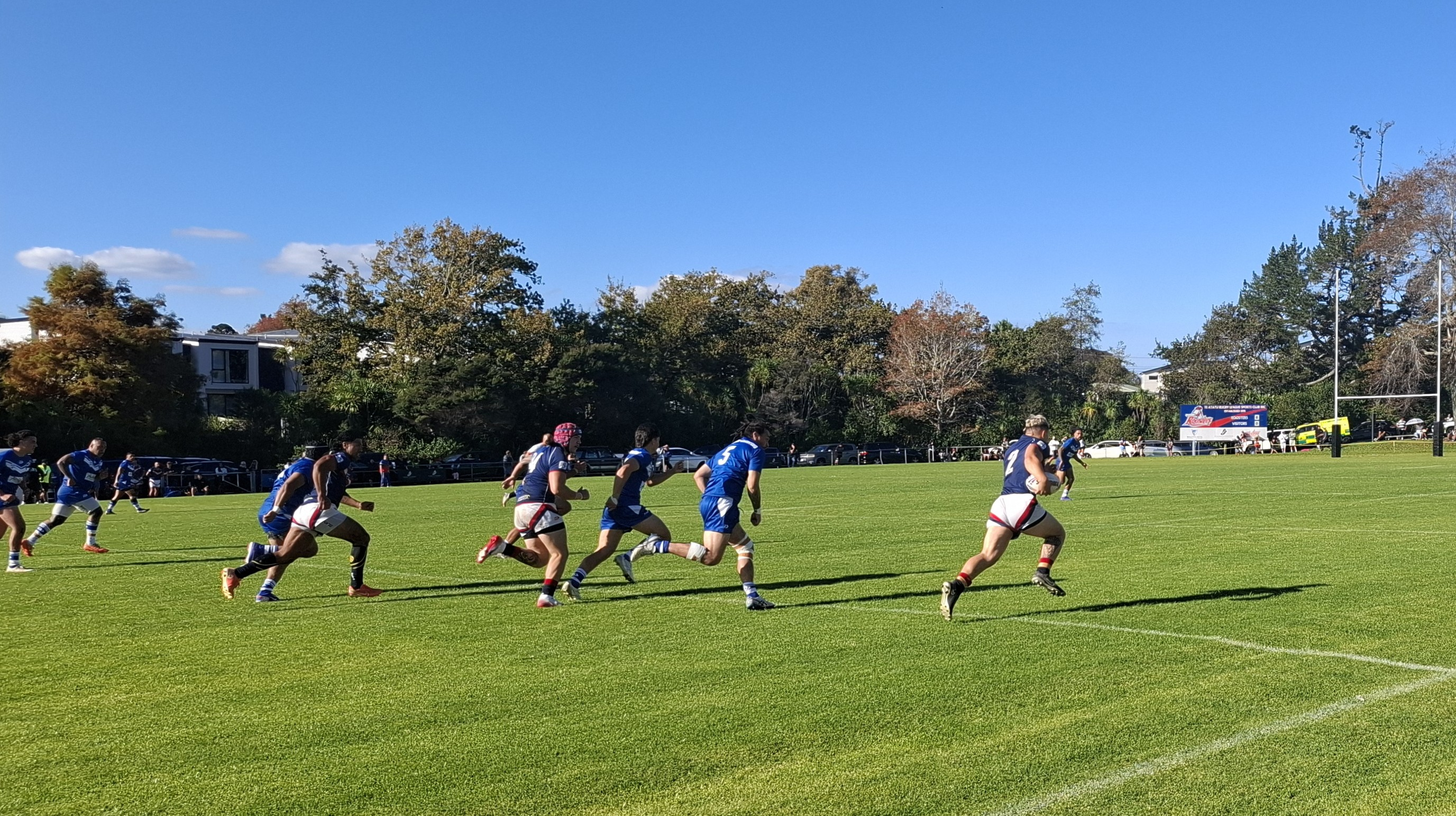
Romeo Schumann of Te Atatu making a break against Glenora.

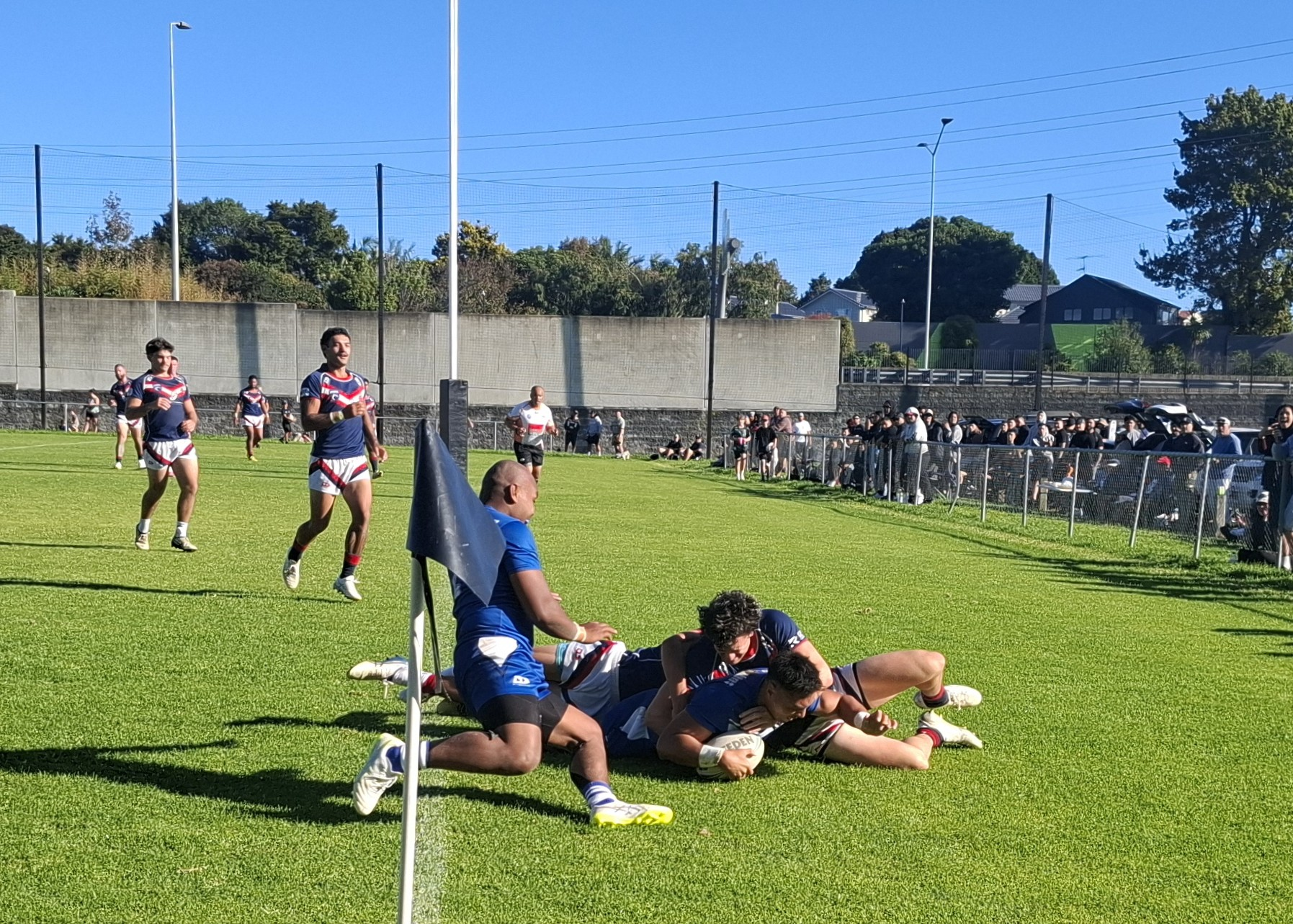
Simon Lafaele scoring for Glenora.

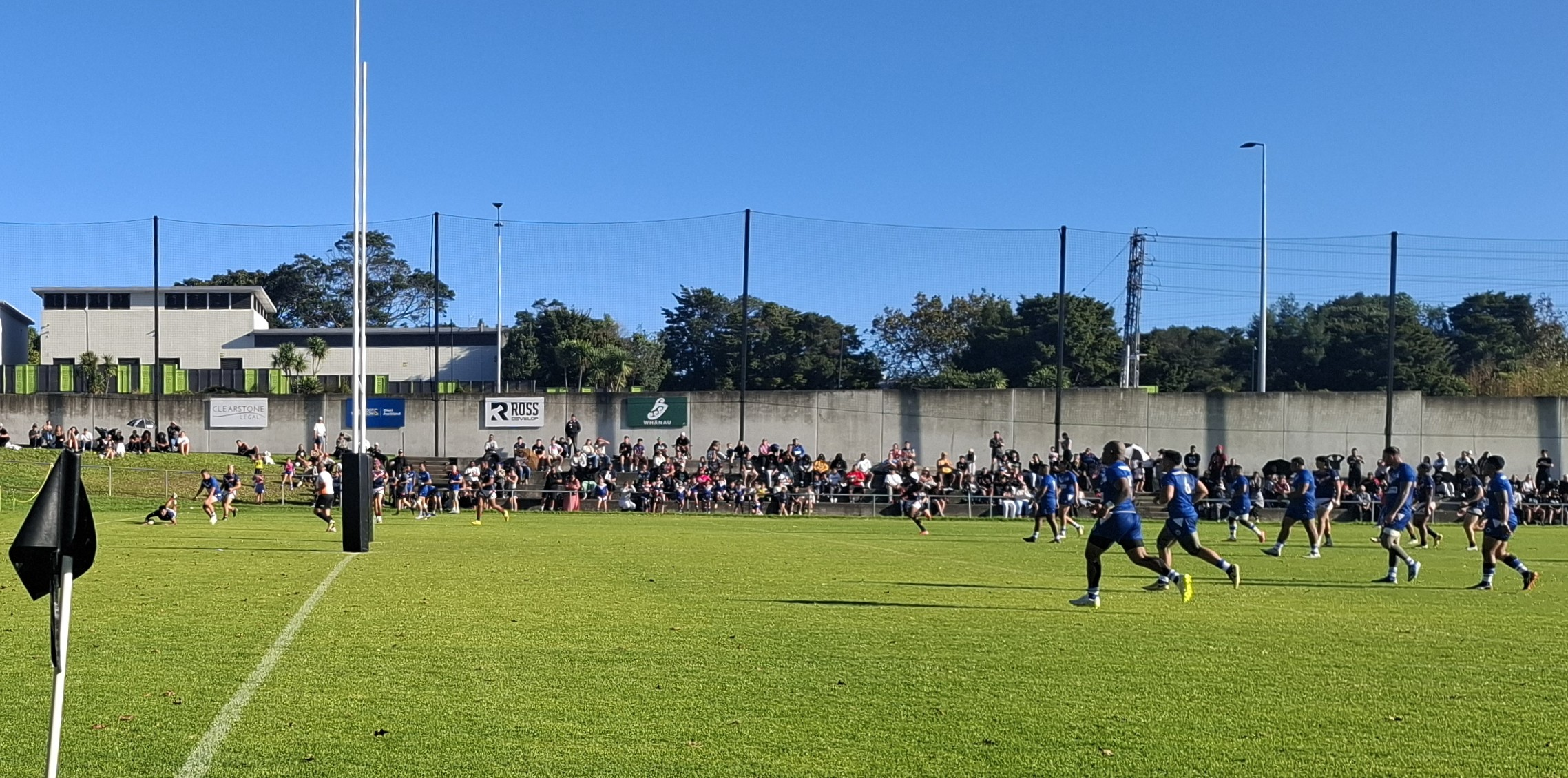
Naiki Paniora scoring a first half try for Te Atatu.

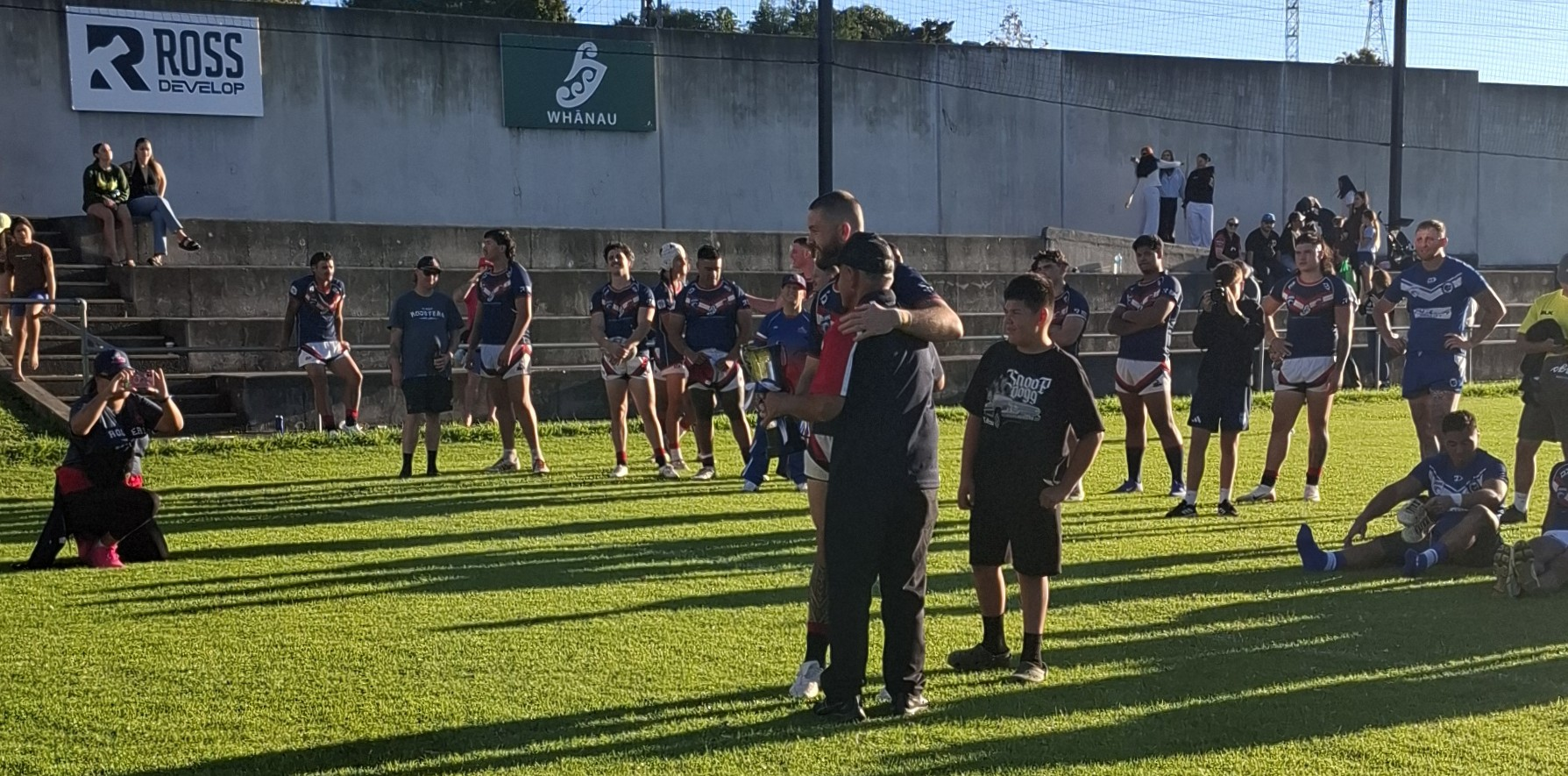
Te Atatu captain Shaun Tempest receiving the Dennis Williams Cup from Dennis Williams.

In Northcote's 18-34 loss to Manurewa, Bronson Kapi was sent off in the 38th minute when the score was 6-14 in favour of Manurewa. Manurewa went on to confortably win 34-18 with Duane Samuel scoring three tries. Hauriri Harvey scored a try and converted one try and also added a penalty near full time. For Northcote veteran Nicholas Lythgo, well known for his fine goal kicking converted all three of their tries with Hamiora Boyed-Hemopo scoring two of them. At Walter Massey Park the home side, Mangere East had a tough draw with Howick 20-20.

25 April	Northcote	18-34	Manurewa	Birkenhead War Memorial 4, Birkenhead
2:30	Try: Jason Bhana (33m), Hamiora Boyed-Hemopo 2 (49m, 61m); Con: Nicholas Lythgo 3/3 (34m, 50m, 61m)		Try: Raymond Tuilimu Jr (6m), Hauriri Harvey (15m), Duane Samuel 3 (25m, 41m, 44m), Braxton Franklyn (42m), Bodhi Hape (76m); Con: Nathan Simmons (7m), Hauriri Harvey (78m); Pen: Hauriri Harvey 1/1 (79m)	Referee: Nigel Williams

25 April	Mangere East	20-20	Howick	Walter Massey Park 1, Māngere
2:30	Try: Nukurua Ngere, Josiah Andrew 2, Jerome Tupuola; Con: Frost Mika 2		Try: Cheshire Mase Carson, Rylan Muaulu 2, Katalau Aso; Con: Joshua Setefano 2	Referee: Kone Lavea

25 April	Te Atatu	44-14 (20-10)	Glenora	Jack Colvin Park 1, Te Atatu Peninsula
2:30	Try: Naiki Paniora 2 (15m, 32m), Romeo Schumann (36m), Dante Henry 2 (40m, 76m), Zensei Inu (42m), Kane Lefleur (48m), Shaun Tempest (64m); Con: Paterika Vaivai 1/2 (16m), Dante Henry 5/7 (33m, 37m, 49m, 65m, 77m)		Try: Felise Simon Luafalealo (19m), Sione Ma’asi (23m), Luke Cunis (58m); Con: Patrick Ioane Unasa (40m)	Attendance: 200; Referee: Mina Nomani

25 April	Hibiscus Coast	16-14 (8-8)	Otara	Stanmore Bay 1, Whangaparāoa
2:30	Try: Cody Jones (14m), Taine Tekiri Ryan (18m), Korey Craig (43m), Peter Kengike (62m)		Try: Afa Sale (7m), Mana’ia Lauaki (30m), Galuafi Sega (79m); Con: Filipo Utai (80m)	Referee: Aaron Kesha

===== Round 2 =====
2 May	Glenora	20-22 (4-16)	Northcote	Harold Moody Park 1, Glen Eden
2:30	Try: Unknown (27m), Unknown (49m), Unknown (61m), Unknown (72m); Con: Unknown (50m, 73m)		Try: Jason Bhana (4m), Jonathan Little (20m), James Bates (32m), France Siakisini Ieremia (57m); Con: Nickolas Lythgo 3/4 (21m, 33m, 58m)	Referee: Mina Nomani

2 May	Otara	18-22 (10-6)	Mangere East	Ngati Ōtara Park 1, Ōtara
2:30	Try: Joshua Perez 2 (18m, 67m), Soul Misiepo (32m), Peyrce Tanaki (63m); Con: Atelea Filo (33m)		Try: Joshua Liupuhi (35m), Christopher Tuha (44m), Paul Taupau (57m), Charles Laumape (77m); Con: John Taupau 3 (37m, 45m, 59m)	Referee: Leon Williamson

2 May	Hibiscus Coast	44-10 (18-4)	Manurewa	Stanmore Bay 1, Whangaparaoa
2:30	Try: Tipene Snowden 2 (7m, 23m), Korey Craig 2 (37m, 72m), Kavana Te Kiri-Ryan (41m), Tevita Kengike (56m), Jesse Heke (61m), Notana Snowden (68m); Con: Caleb Nui 4 (9m, 24m, 38m, 42m), Tipene Snowden 2 (69m, 73m)		Try: Shaquiel Ruri (17m), Jeremiah Tamatimu (64m); Con: Nathan Simmons (66m)	Referee: David Millar

2 May	Te Atatu	12-29 (0-28)	Howick	Jack Colvin Park 1, Te Atatū Peninsula
2:30	Try: Tyson Vakalahi (52m), Kaisara Tuimauga (55m); Con: Dante Henry 2/2 (53m, 57m)		Try: Darius Niumata (19m), Cheshire Mase Carson (24m), Joshua Setefano (28m), Justin Reynolds (31m), Xander Mahu (36m); Con: Joshua Setefano 4/5 (20m, 26m, 29m, 32m); Drop: Joshua Setefano (80m)	Referee: Brent Newton

===== Round 3 =====
9 May	Northcote	12-40 (12-12)	Otara	Birkenhead War Memorial 4, Birkenhead
2:30	Try: Jason Bhana (20m), Jonathan Little (25m); Con: Nickolas Lythgo 1/2 (26m); Pen: Nickolas Lythgo 1/1 (39m)		Try: Raiden Siafolau 2 (35m, 76m), Peyrce Tanaki (39m), Makalani Hakalo (45m), Titanian Palei (56m), Joshua Perez (68m), Taylor Papalii (70m); Con: Makalani Hakalo 6/7 (37m, 40m, 46m, 57m, 72m, 78m)	Referee: Brent Newton

9 May	Glenora	14-26 (14-18)	Hibiscus Coast	Harold Moody Park 1, Glen Eden
2:30	Try: Ronnie Lui Laumatia 2 (24m, 31m), Jason Loza (38m); Con: Patrick Ioane-Unasa (40m)		Try: Cody Jones (3m), Caleb Nui (15m), Te Awa Marino (33m), Tevita Kengike (55m), Nathan Austen (73m); Con: Notana Snowden 3/5 (16m, 34m, 75m)	Referee: Simon Bailey

9 May	Mangere East	14-12 (4-12)	Te Atatu	Walter Massey Park 1, Māngere
2:30	Try: Josiah Andrew (22m), Nukurua Ngere (53m), Christopher Tuha (75m); Con: John Taupau (54m)		Try: Naiki Paniora (2m), Charvez Watts-Ikutule (14m); Con: Dante Henry 2/2 (3m, 14m)	Referee: Nigel Williams

9 May	Manurewa	22-8 (14-8)	Howick	Mountfort Park: Jack Shelly Field, Manurewa
2:30	Try: Hauriri Harvey (14m), Nathan Simmons (27m), Elijah Solomona (51m), Tamati Hebden (77m); Con: Nathan Simmons 2/4 (15m, 29m); Pen: Nathan Simmons 1/1 (37m)		Try: Mo Manu (21m), Sione Tuimoala (71m); Con: Masonryvilla Te Rore 0/2	Referee: David Devonshire

===== Round 4 =====
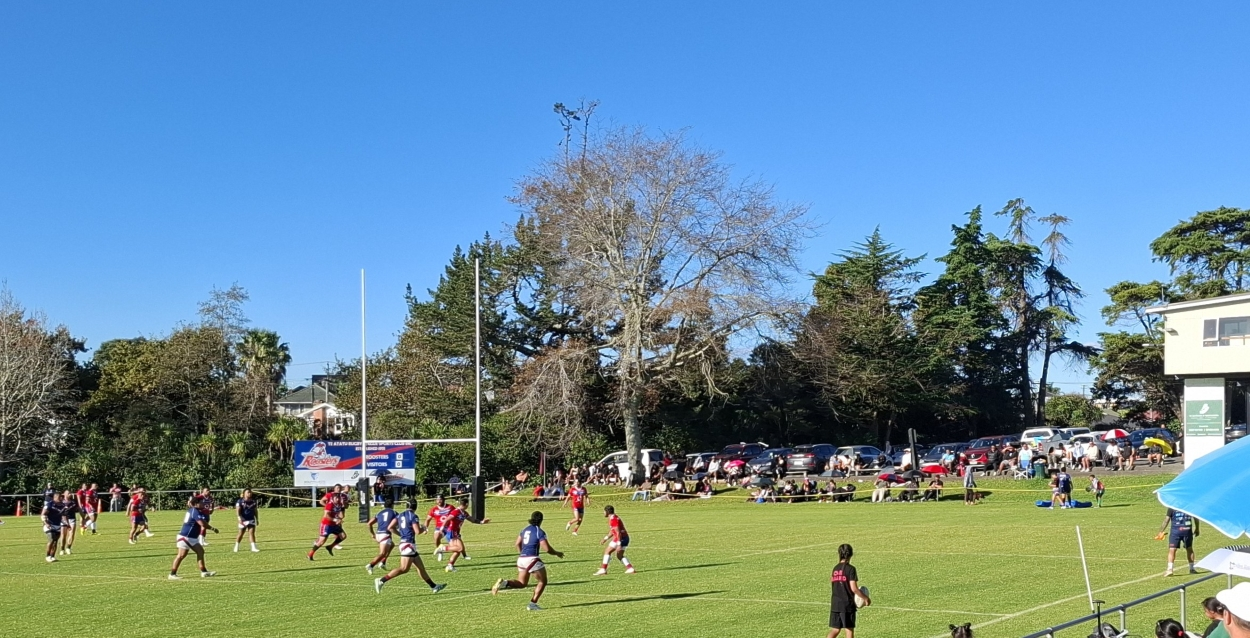
Naiki Paniora about to go through the Otara defence to score.

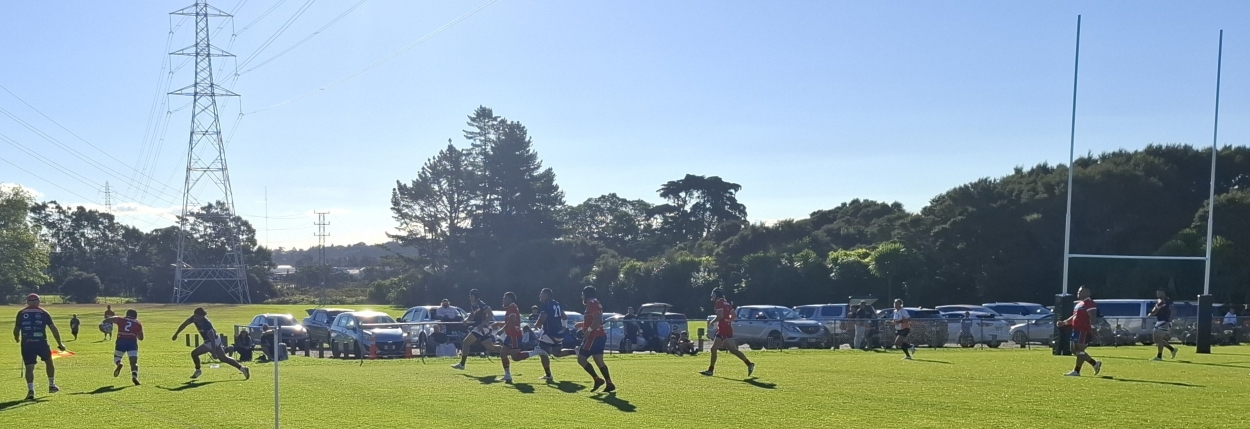
Joshua Perez scoring in the corner for Otara.

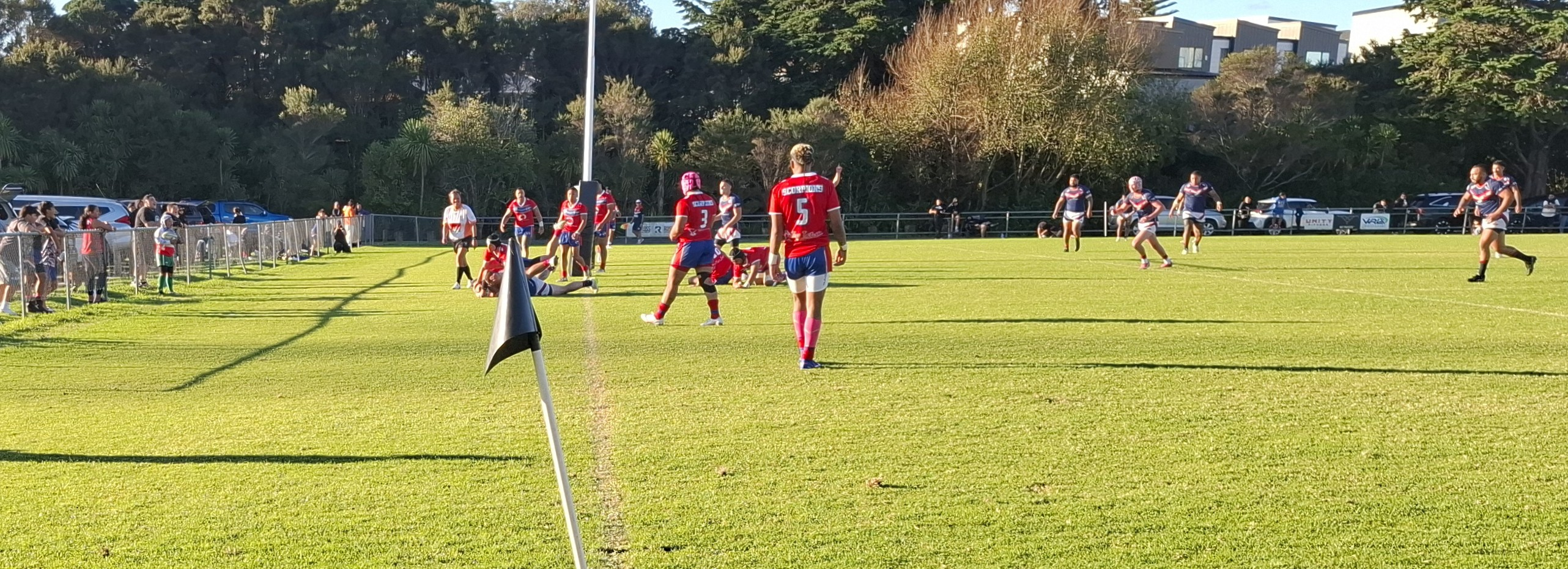
Shaun Tempest scores in the 77th minute for Te Atatu.

Te Atatu snatched a late draw with Otara at Jack Colvin Park when co-captain Shaun Tempest crashed through a tired defence and Steven Perryman's conversion tied the scores at 16-16. A draw was probably a fair reflection of the game which was characterised by solid defense and a steady stream of handling errors. Otara's strength was their ability to break tackles and get offloads away but they lacked finish at times while Te Atatu had a poor day with their last tackle kicks. Rico Toeava Ward scored twice for Otara with Makalani Hakolo kicking a penalty and a conversion but crucially missed a handy conversion in the second half. Hibiscus Coast continued their unbeaten start to the year to remain in first place with a comfortable 50-16 win over Northcote after leading 28-12 at halftime. Kavan Te Kiri-Ryan scored twice for Hibiscus Coast with Notana Snowden converting seven of their nine tries. Mangere East beat Manurewa at Walter Massey Park 32-18. Jayson Taefu scored twice while John Taupau scored a try and kicked three conversions. Manurewa threatened to make it a close finish with Jeremiah Tamatimu scoring his second try in the 6th minute to narrow the score to 26-18 but they got not score again and Taupau ran in an 80th minute try to push the margin out. Howick ground out a 16-0 win against winless Glenora at Paparoa Park with Tony Tuia who will turn 40 later in the year playing in his 250th game for Howick. He joined Howick in 2010 and had in fact played over 300 premier club games in Auckland all up. he had begun playing rugby league for the Mt Wellington Warriors before later joining Mt Albert and then Marist before then arriving at Howick. Tuia said winning the two Fox Memorial Championships with Howick are a career highlight. “I absolutely loved 2011. It was a different stage of my life. It was the first time for the town, and the town jumped on, it was crazy. It was such an awesome team to be part of. “Then we had some tough years, which is how it goes, right? A lot of people stuck around, thanks guys. And so, we won it again in 2019. It showed that we could fight back.

16 May	Hibiscus Coast	50-16 (28-12)	Northcote	Stanmore Bay 1, Whangaparaoa
2:30	Try: Kavana Te Kiri-Ryan (1m), Cody Jones (9m), Ian Mills 2 (13m, 73m), Tipene Snowden (20m), Tevita Kengike (37m), Taine Te Kiri-Ryan (51m), Korey Craig (53m), Peter Kingike (79); Con: Notana Snowden 7/9 (2m, 14m, 21m, 38m, 55m, 75m, 79m)		Try: Jonathan Little (17m), Unknown (30m), Jason Bhana (65m); Con: Nickolas Lythgo 2/3 (18m, 32m)	Referee: Brent Newton

16 May	Te Atatu	16-16 (6-10)	Otara	Jack Colvin Park 1, Te Atatu
2:30	Try: Naiki Paniora (17m), Togamau Elias Sila (34m), Shaun Tempest (77m); Con: Steven Perryman 2/3 (19m, 77m)		Try: Joshua Perez (27m), Rico Toeava Ward 2 (53m, 58m); Con: Makalani Hakalo 1/3 (60m); Pen: Makalani Hakalo 1/1 (40m)	Attendance: 200; Referee: Poriau Uamaki

16 May	Howick	16-0 (8-0)	Glenora	Paparoa Park 1, Howick
2:30	Try: Katalau Aso 2, Chesire Mase Carson; Con: Sione Tuimoala 1/3; Pen: Sione Tuimoala 1/1			Referee: Davey Misileki

16 May	Mangere East	32-18 (16-6)	Manurewa	Walter Massey Park, Mangere
2:30	Try: Numiamasasulu Tema (3m), Paul Taupau (21m), Junior Mata (27m), Jayson Taefu 2 (51m, 60m), John Taupau (80m); Con: Nazareth Vaiouga 1/1 (4m), John Taupau 3/5 (29m 53m, 80m)		Try: Elijah Solomona (7m), Jeremiah Tamatimu 2 (47m, 67m); Con: Nathan Simmons 3/3 (9m, 48m, 69m)	Referee: David Millar

===== Round 5 =====
23 May	Northcote	20-34 (4-16)	Te Atatu	Birkenhead War Memorial 4, Birkenhead
2:30	Try: Jason Bhana (37m), Jonathan Matagaono (46m), Jonathan Little (51m), Tiriaere Tiriaere (66m); Con: Nickolas Lythgo 2/4 (48m, 52m)		Try: Naiki Paniora 2 (6m, 77m), Steven Perryman (11m), Sakaria Paea (25m), Charvez Watts Ikutule 2 (41m, 56m); Con: Dante Henry 2/3 (7m, 79m), Paterika Vaivai 1/1 (26m), Zensei Inu 2/2 (42m, 57m)	Referee: David Devonshire

23 May	Hibiscus Coast	46-26 (24-4)	Howick	Stanmore Bay 1, Whangaparaoa
2:30	Try: Notana Snowden (1m), Korey Craig 2 (23m, 42m), Alipate Liava'a (27m), Nathan Austen (49m), Tipene Snowden (52m), Kavana Te Kiri-Ryan (57m), Tevita Kengike (76m); Con: Notana Snowden 7/8 (2m, 24m, 28m, 44m, 50m, 53m, 58m)		Try: Tuiloma Ioane Futi (31m), Jaz Nahu Main (42m), Juston Reynolds (62m), Chesire Mase Carson (67m), Joshua Gagiano (80m); Con: Joshua Setefano 3 (63m, 68m, 80m)	Referee: Aaron Kesha

23 May	Otara	26-22 (16-10)	Manurewa	Ngati Otara Park 1, Ōtara
2:30	Try: Makalani Hakolo (12m), Filipo Utai 2 (18m, 80m), Titanian Palei 2 (21m, 61m); Con: Makalani Hakalo 3 (19m, 22m, 80m)		Try: Jeremiah Tamatimu (6m), Anaru Thomson 3 (33m, 48m, 69m); Con: Nathan Simmons 3 (7m, 49m, 70m)	Referee: Davey Misileki

23 May	Glenora	24-54 (4-34)	Mangere East	Harold Moody Park 1, Glen Eden
2:30	Try: Sione Ma'asi (25m), Felise Simon Luafalealo (41m), Patrick Ioane-Unasa (44m), Fender Maeva (65m), Werner Faaumuumu (80m); Con: Patrick Ioane-Unasa (46m), Alifaio Lata (66m)		Try: Nukurua Ngere 3 (6m, 32m, 35m), Christopher Tuha 2 (13m, 69m), Numiamasasulu Tema (18m), Jerome Tupuola 2 (22m, 74m), Jasiah Vaiouga (51m), Jayson Taefu (57m); Con: John Taupau 7 (14m, 19m, 24m, 33m, 36m, 53m, 75m)	Referee: Brent Newton

===== Round 6 =====
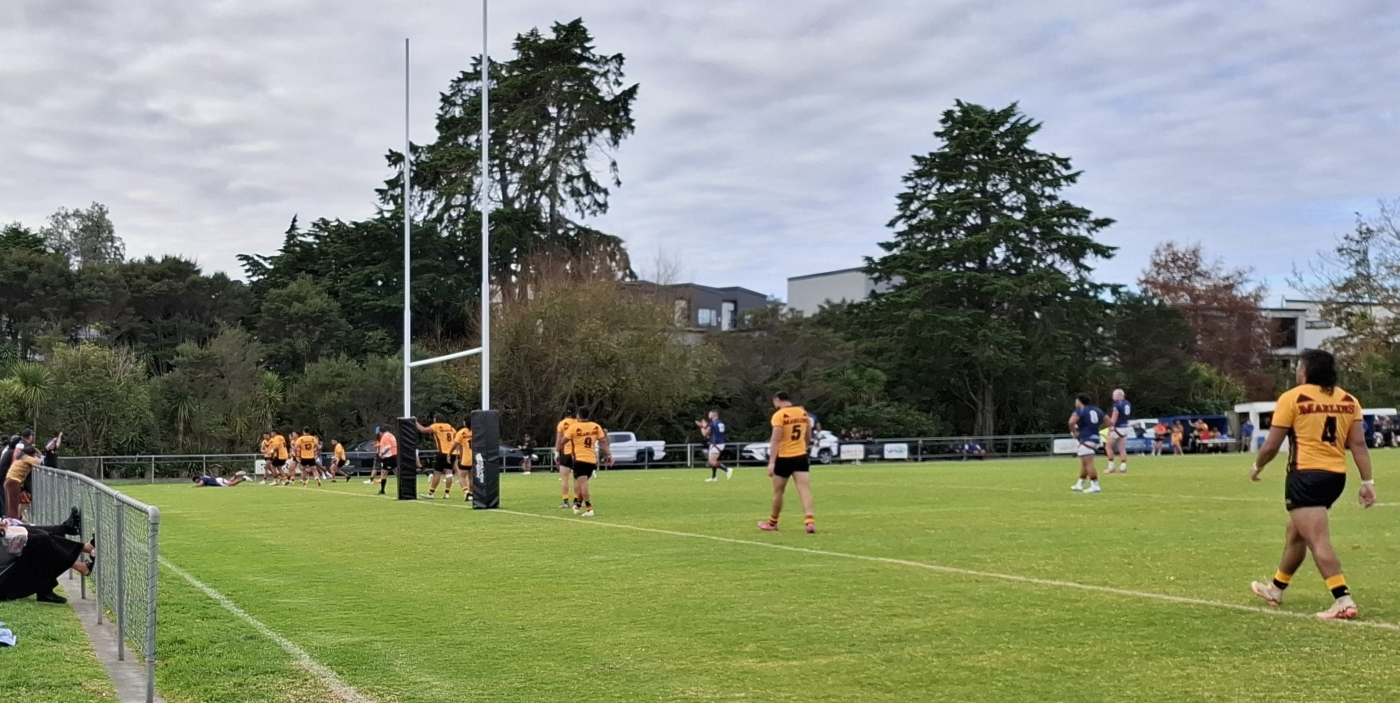
Naiki Paniora scoring Te Atatu's second try.

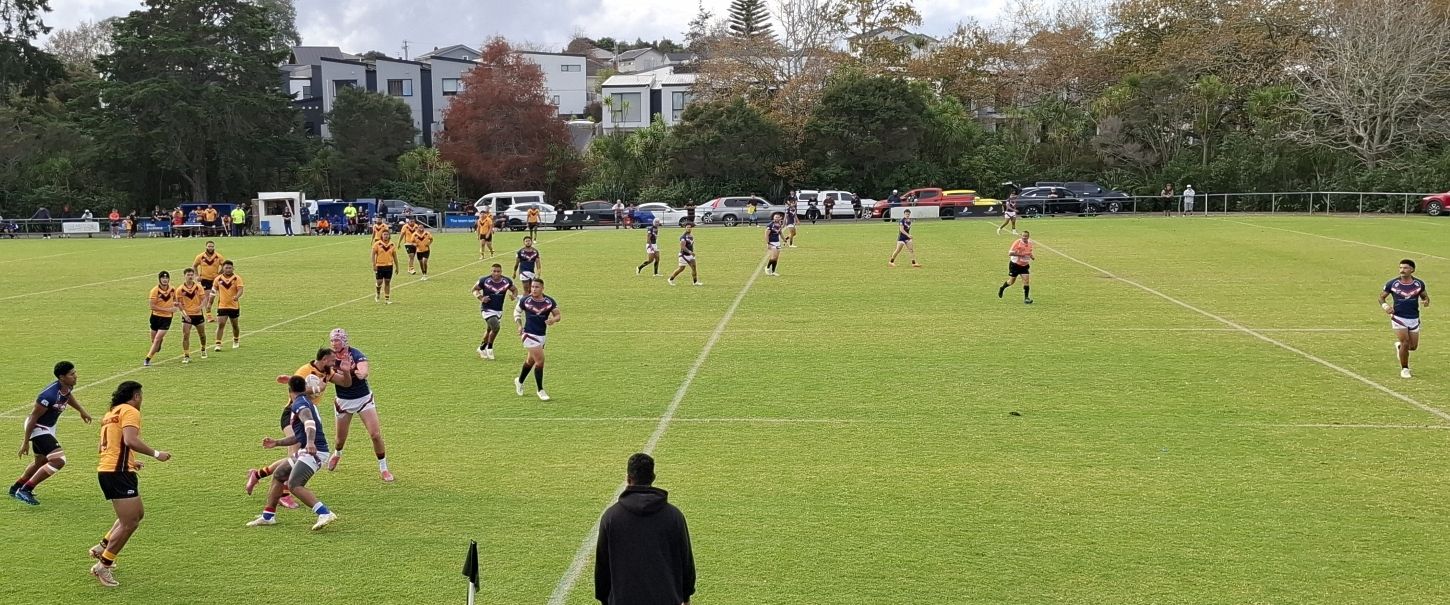
Konisitutone Kengike running into the Te Atatu defence for Manurewa.

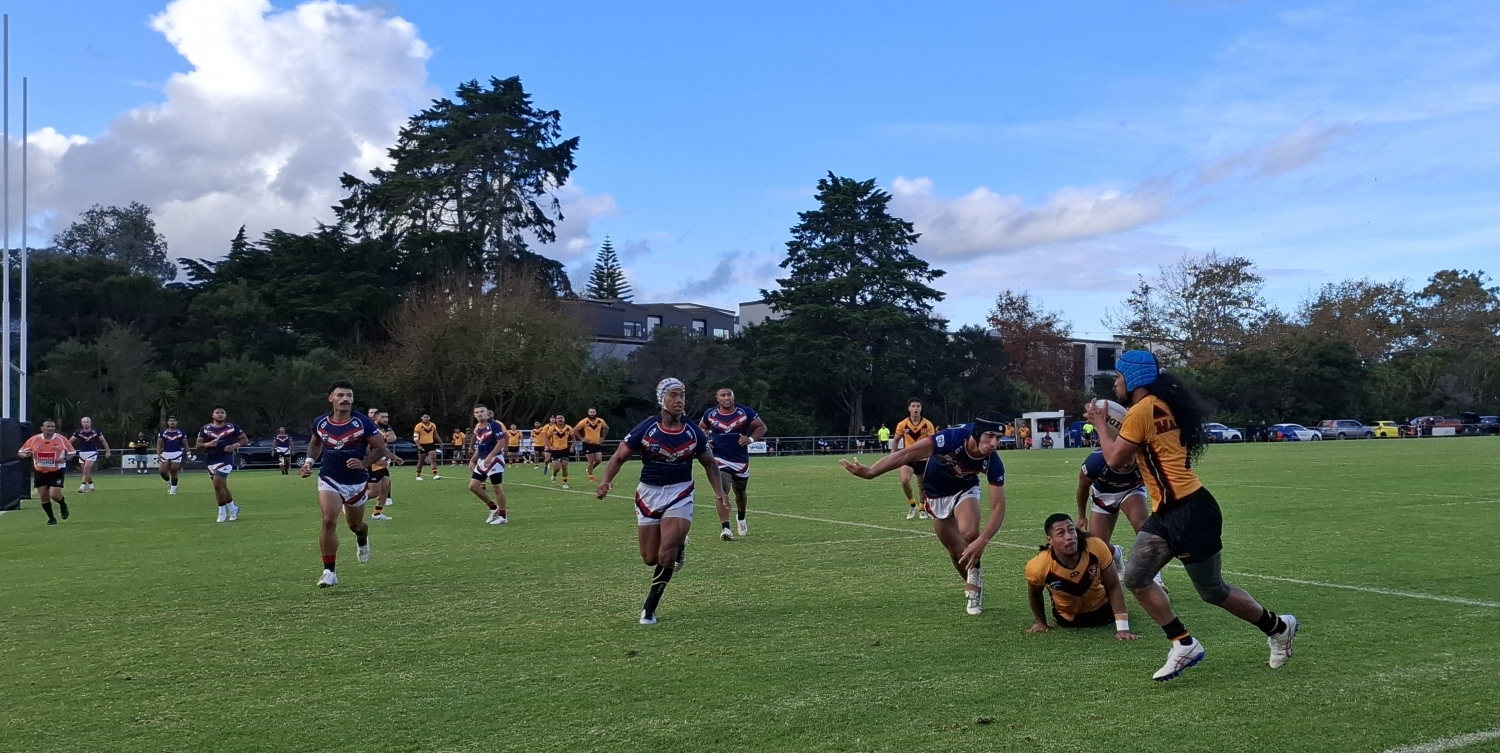
Jeremiah Margraff about to be tackled by the Te Atatu cover defence.

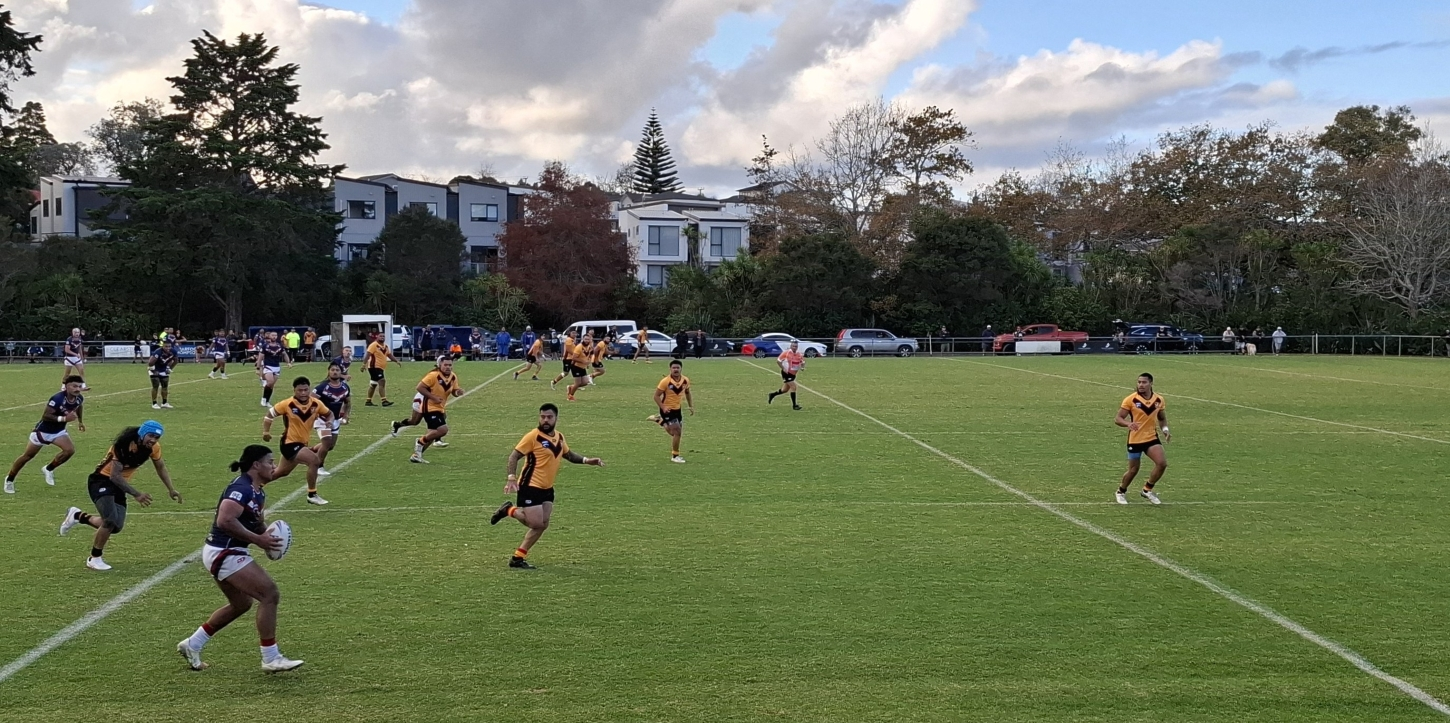
Te Atatu right winger, Sakaraia Paea running with the ball.

Te Atatu threatened to win easily against Manurewa at Jack Colvin Park when Dante Henry's conversion of Sakaria Paea's try in the 29th minute gave them a 16-0 lead but poor discipline and a lopsided penalty count in the second half saw Manurewa work their way back into the game with tries to Anaru Thomson and Harvest Tulafili. Te Atatu was forced to defend their try line multiple times through penalties and poor handling but managed to hang on to win. Captain Shaun Tempest was the standout player for the Roosters while Hauriri Harvey proved a handful when running with the ball for the Marlins. Hibiscus Coast further secured their position at the top of the standings with a 28-10 win over second placed Mangere East. Cody Jones scored a hat trick with the second and third tries sealing the match after they only led 16-10 with 7 minutes to play. Notana Snowden converted four of their five tries. At Harold Moody Park the home Glenora side threatened a big upset when they led 16-6 at halftime after being strengthened by the addition of Zak Tippins and Anthony Goulten who both scored tries. However Otara took the lead in the 50th minute when Makalani Hakalo converted Galuafi Sega's try. They added five more tries with Sam Tufue and Filipo Utai scoring doubles and Hakalo converting seven of their eight tries.

30 May	Howick	40-18 (16-4)	Northcote	Paparoa Park 1, Howick
2:30	Try: Unknown (1m), Unknown (5m), Unknown (25m), Unknown (41m), Unknown (46m), Unknown (65m), Unknown (76m); Con: Unknown (1m), Unknown (26m), Unknown (42m), Unknown (47m), Unknown (66m), Unknown (78m)		Try: JP Autagavaia 2 (20m, 56m), Peter Drought (52m), Psalm Kerehoma (60m); Con: James Bates (61m)	Referee: Poriau Uamaki

30 May	Te Atatu	16-10 (16-0)	Manurewa	Jack Colvin Park 1, Te Atatu Peninsula
2:30	Try: Trey Togo (15m), Naiki Paniora (19m), Sakaria Paea (28m); Con: Dante Henry 2/3 (20m, 29m)		Try: Anaru Thomson (43m), Harvest Tulafili (51m); Con: Nathan Simmons 1/2 (45m)	Referee: Aaron Kesha

30 May	Mangere East	10-28 (4-16)	Hibiscus Coast	Walter Massey Park 1, Māngere
2:30	Try: Junior Mata (24m), Jerome Tupuola (64m); Con: John Taupau (64m)		Try: Tevita Kengike (9m), Cody Jones 3 (15m, 73m, 78m), Korey Craig (37m); Con: Notana Snowden 4/5 (10m, 17m, 75m, 79m)	Referee: Eisley Brown

30 May	Glenora	22-46 (16-6)	Otara	Harold Moody Park 1, Glen Eden
2:30	Try: Wyllis Maihi 2 (12m, 66m), Zacharia Tippins (36m), Anthony Goulton (40m); Con: Patrick Ioane-Unasa 3/4 (14m, 40m, 67m)		Try: Peter Papalii (24m), Sam Tufue 2 (42m, 70m), Galuafi Sega (49m), Saul Tauhinu (54m), Filipo Utai 2 (59m, 78m), Tiaan Tauhinu (63m); Con: Makalani Hakalo 7/8 (25m, 43m, 50m, 56m, 61m, 64m, 79m)	Referee: David Devonshire

===== Round 7 =====
6 June	Northcote	10-42 (6-28)	Mangere East	Birkenhead War Memorial 4, Birkenhead
2:30	Try: Psalm Kerehoma (24m), James Bates (50m); Con: James Bates 1/2 (26m)		Try: Jireh Westerlund 2 (4m, 36m), Paul Taupau 3 (9m, 29m, 68m), Nukurua Ngere (31m), Christopher Tuha (40m), John Taupau (46m); Con: John Taupau 5/8 (10m, 30m, 32m, 38m, 70m)	Referee: Brent Newton

6 June	Manurewa	22-18 (18-8)	Glenora	Mountfort Park: Jack Shelly Field, Manurewa
2:30	Try: Elijah Solomona 3 (6m, 35m, 79m), Shaquiel Ruri 2 (9m, 14m); Con: Hauriri Harvey 1/5 (7m)		Try: Ronnie Lui Laumatia (27m), Daniel Reuelu-Buchanan (40m), Anthony Goulton (70m), Sione Ma'asi (78m); Con: Ronnie Lui Laumatia 0/1, Fender Maeva 1/3 (79m)	Attendance: 150; Referee: Aaron Kesha

6 June	Otara	14-10 (10-6)	Howick	Ngati Ōtara Park 1, Ōtara
2:30	Try: Atalea Filo (8m), Sam Tufue (17m), Filipo Utai (68m); Con: Makalani Hakalo (9m)		Try: Darius Niumata 2 (34m, 75m); Con: Joshua Setefano 1/2 (35m)	Referee: Eisley Brown

6 June	Hibiscus Coast	42-8 (10-4)	Te Atatu	Stanmore Bay 1, Whangaparaoa
2:30	Try: Ian Mills (6m), Korey Craig 3 (20m, 56m, 80m), Jaeden Foua (44m), Cody Jones 2 (49m, 73m), Tevita Kingike (59m); Con: Notana Snowden (23m), Tipene Snowden 4 (50m, 57m, 59m, 80m)		Try: Tyson Vakalahi (12m), Naiki Paniora (68m)	Referee: David Millar

===== Round 8 =====
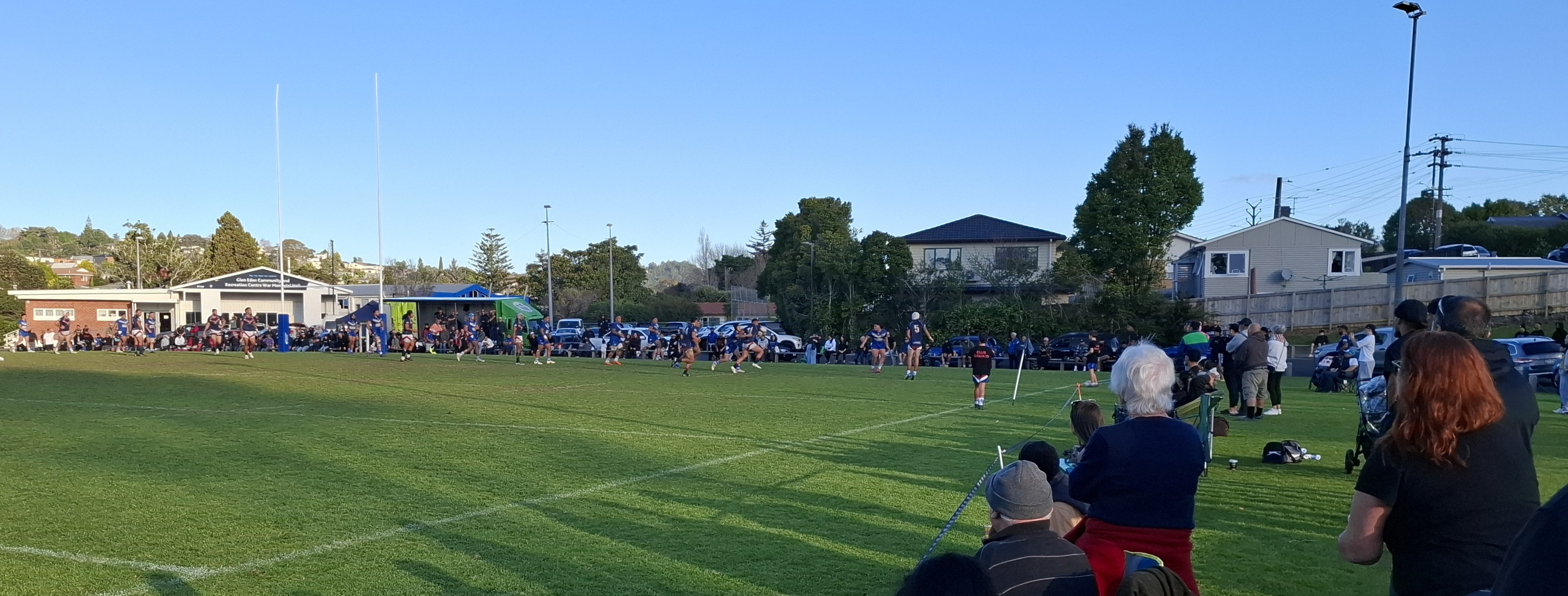
Glenora defending their try line in the last minute of their 16-14 win over Te Atatu.

Glenora recorded their first win of the season when they beat rivals Te Atatu 16-14 at Harold Moody Park. They played a steady game to take the narrow win against an opponent which once again committed a huge number of handling errors and blew several chances. Te Atatu opened the scoring early before conceding the lead. Then mid way through the second half they scored their third try to take a 14-12 lead. Jason Loza scored his second try for Glenora to put the home side back in front in the 65th minute. With a minute remaining Te Atatu defended their line and then from a resulting scrum ten metres out centre Lucas Adams made a clean break and was only brought down by the Glenora fullback beyond half way. Te Atatu bombed for the corner on the last but the winger was unable to bring the ball down cleanly and Glenora hung on for the win.

13 June	Manurewa	40-12 (20-6)	Northcote	Mountfort Park: Jack Shelly Field, Manurewa
2:30	Try: Unknown (1m, 4m, 15m, 20m, 56m, 69m, 73m, 78m); Con: Unknown (5m, 17m, 71m, 79m)		Try: James Bates (34m), Taine Neho (43m); Con: James Bates 2/2 (36m, 44m)	Referee: David Devonshire

13 June	Howick	16-12	Mangere East	Paparoa Park 1, Howick
2:30				Referee: Gabriel Thompson

13 June	Glenora	16-14 (6-4)	Te Atatu	Harold Moody 1, Glen Eden
2:30	Try: Wyllis Maihi (37m), Jason Loza 2 (44m, 65m); Con: Patrick Ioane-Unasa 2/3 (37m, 46m)		Try: Dior-Cruz Wea (16m), Kostya Boyes (49m), Tyson Vakalahi (52m); Con: Noah Godfrey (53m)	Referee: Nigel Williams

13 June	Otara	34-20 (12-14)	Hibiscus Coast	Ngati Ōtara Park 1, Ōtara
2:30	Try: Finau Fosita (7m), Titanian Palei 2 (29m, 44m), Sam Tufue 2 (36m, 56m), Makalani Hakalo (45m); Con: Makalani Hakalo 3 (45m, 48m, 57m); Pen: Makalani Hakalo 2 (53m, 61m)		Try: Taine Te Kiri-Ryan (11m), Kavana Te Kiri-Ryan 2 (20m, 40m), Peter Kengike (66m); Con: Notana Snowden (22m), Tipene Snowden (67m)	Referee: Davey Misileki

===== Round 9 =====
20 June	Northcote	16-24 (6-18)	Glenora	Birkenhead War Memorial 4, Birkenhead
2:30	Try: JP Autagavaia 2, Jonathan Little (51m); Con: JP Autagavaia, Nickolas Lythgo		Try: Zac Tippins 2, Gage Cash, Daniel Reuelu-Buchanan; Con: Patrick Ioane-Unasa 4/4	Referee: Simon Bailey

20 June	Mangere East	12-46 (8-10)	Otara	Walter Massey Park 1, Māngere
2:30	Try: Atonio Manuhaapai 2 (9m, 33m), Josiah Andrew (46m)		Try: Filpo Utai 3 (25m, 37m, 58m), Kurtis Cooper (51m), Saul Tauhinu (55m), Makalani Hakalo (65m), Taylor Papalii (75m), Titanium Palei (78m); Con: Makalani Hakalo 7/8 (26m, 52m, 56m, 59m, 67m, 77m, 78m)	Referee: Nigel Williams

20 June	Manurewa	32-26 (16-16)	Hibiscus Coast	Mountfort Park: Jack Shelly Field, Manurewa
2:30	Try: Tevita Manuika (2m), Steve Moafanua 2 (8m, 57m), Anaru Thomson (13m), Jeremiah Tamatimu (49m), Hauriri Harvey (75m); Con: Nathan Simmons 4 (3m, 15m, 58m, 76m)		Try: Cody Jones (19m), Jesse Heke (26m), Taylor Raj (37m), Korey Craig (41m), Te Awa Marino (78m); Con: Taylor Raj (27m), Tipene Snowden 2 (39m, 42m)	Referee: Aaron Kesha

20 June	Howick	12-10 (12-6)	Te Atatu	Paparoa Park 1, Howick
2:30	Try: Jethro Friend (18m), Katalau Aso (26m); Con: Joshua Setefano 2/2 (19m, 27m)		Try: Roy Mikaele (3m), Sakaria Paea (44m); Con: Paterika Vaivai (4m)	Referee: Davey Misileki

===== Round 10 =====
27 June	Otara	58-18 (30-12)	Northcote	Ngati Ōtara Park 1, Ōtara
2:30	Try: Filipo Utai 2 (1m, 66m), Patita Lakai 2 (9m, 13m), Finau Fosita (13m), Sam Tufue (17m), Kurtis Cooper 2 (20m, 69m), Rico Toeava Ward (23m), Atelea Filo (44m), Galuafi Sega (75m), Raiden Siafolau (77m); Con: Makalani Hakalo 4 (2m, 21m, 24m, 76m), Filipo Utai (78m)		Try: Jason Bhana 2 (6m, 47m), JP Autagavaia (32m); Con: Nickolas Lythgo 3/3 (7m, 34m, 48m)	Referee: Aaron Kesha

27 June	Hibiscus Coast	40-18 (18-8)	Glenora	Stanmore Bay 1, Whangaparāoa
2:30	Try: Tevita Kengike (11m), Korey Craig 3 (21m, 55m, 71m), Nathan Austen (28m), Tipene Snowden (43m), Kavana Te Kiri-Ryan (57m); Con: Notana Snowden 4 (12m, 22m, 29m, 72m), Tipene Snowden (56m); Pen: Tipene Snowden (73m)		Try: Dominique Hakeagaiki (4m), Ronnie Lui Laumatia 2 (32m, 74m), August Tofa (61m); Con: Fender Maeva (62m)	Referee: Jordan Chand

27 June	Te Atatu	34-12 (16-0)	Mangere East	Jack Colvin Park 1, Te Atatū
2:30	Try: Noah Godfrey (1m), Trey Togo (4m), Naiki Paniora (38m), Zensei Inu 2 (41m, 60m), Logan Tuimauga (56m); Con: Paterika Vaivai 1/2 (2m), Noah Godfrey 4/4 (39m, 42m, 59m, 62m)		Try: Junior Mata (46m), Atonio Manuhaapai (49m); Con: Jayson Taefu 2/2 (47m, 50m)	Referee: Nigel Williams

27 June	Howick	28-16 (20-0)	Manurewa	Paparoa Park 1, Howick
2:30	Try: Joshua Setefano (10m), Sione Tuimoala (13m), Jethro Friend (27m), Justin Reynolds (33m), Clayton Williams (54m); Con: Joshua Setefano 3 (11m, 34m, 55m); Pen: Joshua Setefano (80m)		Try: Jeremiah Margraff (49m), Corey Hebden (68m), Lyrahlle Murray (73m); Con: Nathan Simmons 2/3 (68m, 74m)	Referee: Eisley Brown

===== Round 11 =====
4 July	Northcote	16-16 (6-4)	Hibiscus Coast	Birkenhead War Memorial 4, Birkenhead
2:30	Try: Taine Neho (16m), Jonathan Little (65m), Sebastian Mortimer (78m); Con: Nickolas Lythgo 2/3 (17m, 67m)		Try: Taine Te Kiri-Ryan (22m), Korey Craig (47m), Notana Snowden (74m); Con: Notana Snowden 2/3 (49m, 75m)	Referee: Aphichart Korhomklang

4 July	Otara	28-26 (20-10)	Te Atatu	Ngati Ōtara Park 1, Ōtara
2:30	Try: Josiah Siitia (4m), Titanian Palei (17m), Filipo Utai (20m), Rico Toeava Ward (35m), Taylor Papalii (50m); Con: Titanian Palei 3/5 (5m, 36m, 52m); Pen: Titanian Palei 1/1 (58m)		Try: Trey Togo (13m), Roy Mikaele (28m), Noah Godfrey 2 (63m, 68m), Zensei Inu (74m); Con: Noah Godfrey (15m), Paterika Vaivai (64m), Dante Henry (70m)	Referee: Aaron Kesha

4 July	Glenora	16-17 (8-12)	Howick	Harold Moody Park 1, Glen Eden
2:30	Try: Anthony Goulton (29m), Alifaio Lata (38m), Nikora Wiparata-Evans (57m), Luke Cunis (72m)		Try: Clayton Williams (6m, 22m), Sione Tuimoala (64m); Con: Joshua Setafano 2/3 (7m, 23m); Drop: Joshua Setefano (79m)	Referee: Nigel Williams

4 July	Manurewa	38-14 (16-10)	Mangere East	Mountfort Park: Jack Shelly Field, Manurewa
2:30	Try: Nathan Simmons (8m), Elijah Solomona (26m), Cornelius Sua (39m), Daylee Dutton (52m), Lyrahile Murray (64m), Temanu Temanu 2 (69m, 78m); Con: Nathan Simmons 3 (9m, 39m, 53m), Jeremiah Tamatimu 2 (70m, 79m)		Try: John Taupau (23m), Jireh Westerlun (34m), Jerome Tupuloa (80m); Con: Jayson Taefu (35m)	Attendance: 250; Referee: Brent Newton

===== Round 12 =====
11 July	Te Atatu	34-36 (12-10)	Northcote	Jack Colvin Park 1, Te Atatu
2:30	Try: Dante Henry (36m), Kostya Boyes (39m), Shaun Tempest (46m), Tyson Vakalahi (52m), Filisi Crichton (56m), Kaisara Tuimauga (65m); Con: Unknown (39m, 40m), Noah Godfrey (48m, 58m), Unknown (67m)		Try: Unknown (1m, 11m, 41m, 62m, 67m, 73m, 79m); Con: Unknown (13m, 62m, 68m, 80m)

11 July	Howick	14-30 (4-12)	Hibscus Coast	Paparoa Park 1, Howick
2:30	Try: Michael Laulu (7m), Darius Niumata (53m), Richard Piper (65m); Con: Rongonui Andrews (67m)		Try: Taine TeKiri Ryan (22m), Korey Craig (27m), Tevita Kengike (58m), Tipene Snowden 2 (79m, 80m); Con: Notana Snowden 5/5 (24m, 28m, 59m, 79m, 80m)

11 July	Manurewa	36-30 (10-18)	Otara	Mountfort Park: Jack Shelly Field, Manurewa
2:30	Try: Jeremiah Margraff (8m), Elijah Solomona (36m), Temanu Temanu 2 (41m, 53m), Jeremiah Tamatimu (46m), Ashton Denton-Woodhouse (56m), Steve Moafanua (69m); Con: Steve Moafanua (37m), Ashton Denton-Woodhouse 3 (47m, 55m, 57m)		Try: Taylor Papalii (14m), Finau Fosita (21m), Raiden Siafolau (26m), Titanian Palei (76m), Lorrenzo Patane (80m); Con: Titanian Palei 5/5 (15m, 22m, 28m, 76m, 80m)

11 July	Mangere East	26-32 (14-10)	Glenora	Walter Massey Park 1, Māngere
2:30	Try: John Taupau (4m), Atonio Manuhaapai (9m), Christopher Tuha (38m), Nukurua Ngere 2 (48m, 69m); Con: Jayson Taefu 3 (39m, 49m, 70m)		Try: Dominique Hakeagaiki (17m), Kane Adams (23m), Ronnie Lui Laumatia 2 (57m, 65m), Anthony Goulton (61m), Wyllis Maihi (77m); Con: Alifaio Lata 3 (25m, 62m, 78m); Pen: Alifaio Lata 1/1 (72m)

===== Round 13 =====
18 July	Northcote	22-26 (10-10)	Howick	Birkenhead War Memorial 4, Birkenhead
2:30	Try: Sebastian Mortimer (13m), JP Autagavaia 2 (17m, 66m), Jonathan Little (70m); Con: Nickolas Lythgo 3/4 (2m, 67m, 71m)		Try: Unknown (23m, 30m, 54m, 73m, 78m); Con: Unknown (31m, 74m); Pen: Unknown (76m)	Referee: Nigel Williams

18 July	Manurewa	54-20 (26-10)	Te Atatu	Mountfort Park: Jack Shelly Field, Manurewa
2:30	Try: Ashton Denton-Woodhouse 2 (2m, 5m), Elijah Solomona (10m), Piringi Tawhai (32m), Jeremiah Margraff (36m), Anaru Thomson (45m), Hauriri Harvey 2 (54, 70m), Nathan Simmons (64m), Hurricain Roberts (77m); Con: Nathan Simmons 5 (3m, 7m, 32m, 46m, 55m), Hauriri Harvey 2 (66m, 72m)		Try: Shaun Tempest (22m), Zensei Inu (26m), Ezra Nataealofa (50m), Kaisara Tuimauga (60m); Con: Noah Godfrey 2/4 (23m, 51m)	Referee: David Devonshire

18 July	Hibiscus Coast	36-8 (12-4)	Mangere East	Stanmore Bay 1, Whangaparaoa
2:30	Try: Korey Craig 4 (35m, 41m, 54m, 58m), Kavana Te Kiri-Ryan (39m), Taine Te Kiri-Ryan (72m), Nathan Austen (80m); Con: Notana Snowden (37m, 40m, 55m), Tipene Snowden (73m)		Try: Malachi Vaiouga (20m), Liam Poe-Viviani (48m)	Referee: Aaron Kesha

18 July	Otara	52-10 (18-6)	Glenora	Ngati Ōtara Park 1, Ōtara
2:30	Try: Filipo Utai 3 (1m, 63m, 76m), Atalea Filo (6m), Saul Tauhinu (24m), Sam Tufue (44m), Josiah Siitia (48m), Titanian Palei 2 (67m, 70m), Kurtis Cooper (79m); Con: Makalani Hakalo 6 (2m, 7m, 25m, 49m, 64m, 71m)		Try: Sione Ma'Asi (30m), Wyllis Maihi (51m); Con: Alifaio Lata (32m)	Referee: Brent Newton

===== Round 14 =====
Simon Luafalealo played his 100th game for the Glenora premier side in their final round match with Manurewa.

25 July	Mangere East	24-22 (12-12)	Northcote	Walter Massey Park 1, Māngere
2:30	Try: Unknown (1m), Unknown (35m), Unknown (59m), Unknown (64m), Unknown (71m); Con: Unknown (2m, 36m)		Try: Bronson Kapi (21m), Jonathan Little (27m), JP Autagavaia (51m), Sebastian Mortimer (75m); Con: Nickolas Lythgo 3/4 (22m, 28m, 76m)	Referee: Aaron Kesha

25 July	Glenora	30-20 (14-4)	Manurewa	Harold Moody Park 1, Glen Eden
2:30	Try: Ronnie Lui Laumatia (23m), Patrick Ioane-Unasa 2 (29m, 51m), Alifaio Lata 2 (35m, 57m), Wyllis Maihi (65m); Con: Fender Maeva (25m), Wyllis Maihi 2 (57m, 65m)		Try: Jeremiah Margraff (4m), Steve Moafanua (42m), Jeremiah Tamatimu (71m), Temanu Temanu (80m); Con: Nathan Simmons 2 (44m, 80m)	Referee: Nigel Williams

25 July	Howick	38-22 (24-10)	Otara	Papaproa Park 1, Howick
2:30	Try: Justin Reynolds 2 (2m, 53m), Rongonui Andrews (11m), Peter Heretama Wikaire (15m), Katalau Aso (32m), Reuben Toa (59m), Richard Piper (62m); Con: Joshua Setefano 5 (3m, 13m, 17m, 32m, 60m)		Try: George Harris-Paniani (4m), Makalani Hakalo 3 (19m, 41m, 74m); Con: Makalani Hakalo 3/4 (20m, 42m, 75m)	Referee: Eisley Brown

25 July	Te Atatu	20-20 (10-6)	Hibiscus Coast	Jack Colvin Park 1, Te Atatū
2:30	Try: Jacob Masoe 2 (26m, 41m), Ihaka Graham (32m), Naiki Paniora (61m); Con: Dante Henry (34m), Zensei Inu (42m)		Try: Korey Craig (39m), Taine Clerke (46m), Corey Levien (53m), Tevita Kengike (57m); Con: Notana Snowden 2 (40m, 47m)	Referee: David Millar

===== Playoffs =====
====== Major Semi Final 1 ======
1 August	Hibiscus Coast	26-22 (20-6)	Otara	Stanmore Bay Park 1, Whangaparaoa
2:30	Try: Taine Te Kiri-Ryan (5m), Te Awa Marino (17m), Korey Craig 3 (28m, 34m, 58m); Con: Notana Snowden 3/5 (29m, 36m, 60m)		Try: Saul Tauhinu (20m), Filipo Utai (49m), Kurtis Cooper (64m), Rico Toeava Ward (66m); Con: Titanian Palei (22m), Makalani Hakalo 2 (50m, 66m)	Referee: Daniel Caddy

====== Minor Semi Final ======
1 August	Howick	18-6 (12-0)	Manurewa	Paparoa Park 1, Howick
2:30	Try: Joshua Setefano 3 (7m, 23m, 44m); Con: Joshua Setefano 3/3 (8m, 24m, 46m)		Try: Anaru Thomson (60m); Con: Nathan Simmons 1/1 (61m)	Referee: Eisley Brown

====== Major Semi Final 2 ======
8 August	Otara	18-48 (8-26)	Howick	Ngāti Ōtara Park 1, Ōtara
2:30	Try: Titanian Palei 2 (33m, 36m), Filipo Utai (65m), Makalani Hakalo (80m); Con: Tagasia Fulutusi (71m)		Try: Darius Niumata 2 (5m, 55m), Joshua Setefano 2 (8m, 76m), Justin Reynolds 3 (14m, 45m, 61m), Peter Heretama Wikaire (18m), Sione Tuimoala (26m); Con: Joshua Setefano 6 (9m, 15m, 27m, 47m, 56m, 63m)	Referee: Daniel Caddy, TJ's: James Priest & Michael Une

====== Grand Final ======
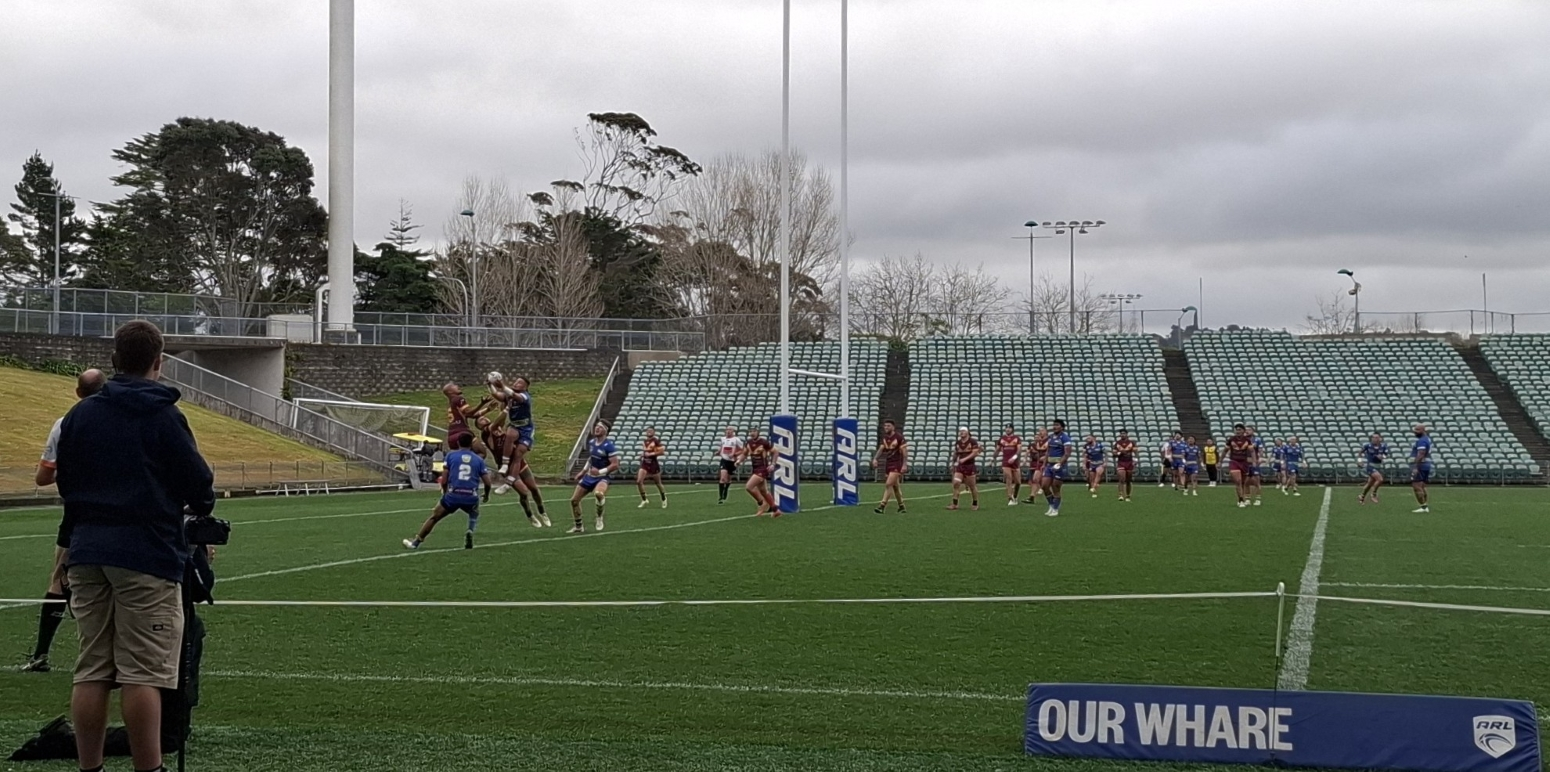
Rylan Muaulu leaping to catch a ball and then score for Howick in the first half.

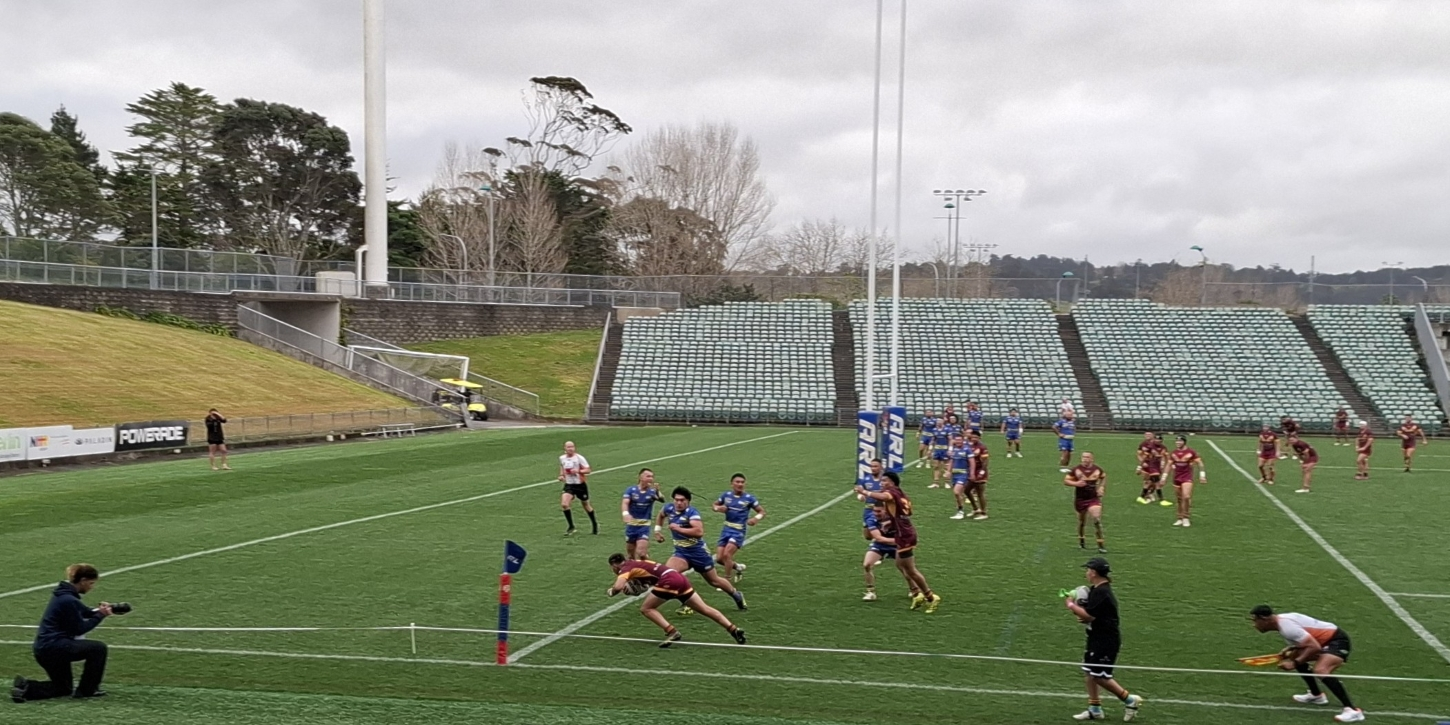
Taine Tekiri-Ryan scoring for Hibiscus Coast to give them an 18-14 lead.

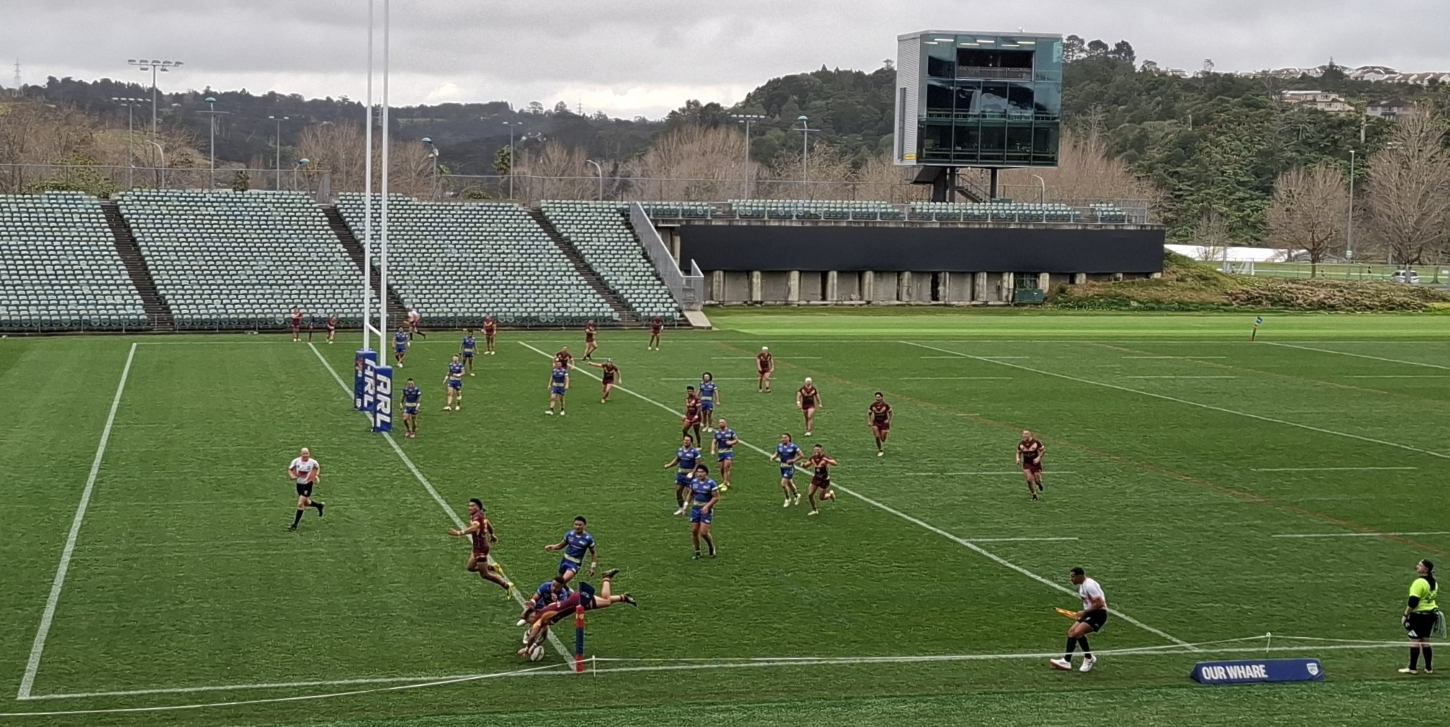
Taine Tekiri-Ryan crossing for his third try.

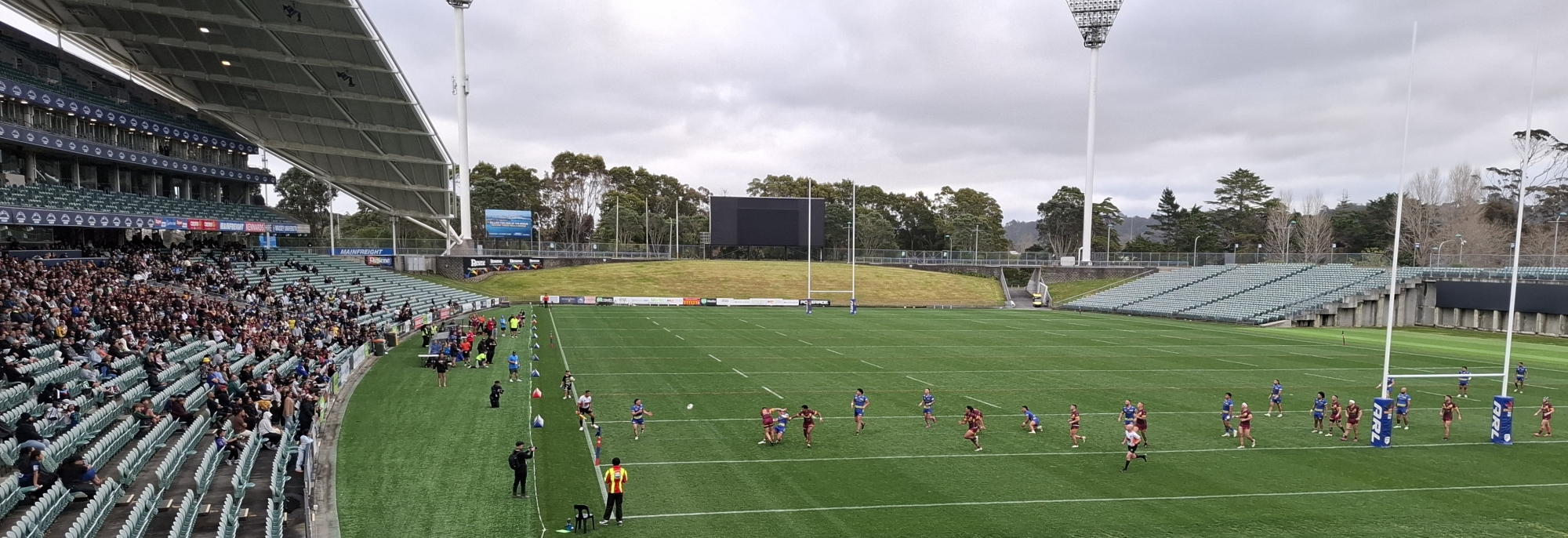
Youngblood Doyle scoring a late try for Howick.

The Sharman Cup final was played at North Harbour Stadium in cloudy but dry conditions with Hibiscus Coast winning 24-18. Howick took the opening lead after back to back penalties saw them camped on the Hibiscus Coast line and Josh Setefano stepped his way over to score under the posts and then converted his own try. Hibiscus Coast replied in the 9th minute when hooker, Tipene Snowden shaped to pass left from dummy half before running himself and going over in a tackle. Notana Snowden levelled the scores with the conversion from 15 metres to the left of the posts. The Raiders went in front in the 18th minute when Taylor Raj slid a short kick through for second rower Ian Mills to run on to and dive over. Hibiscus Coast had attacking ball but failed to take advantage of it and then Howick full back Mase Carson made a half break out of dummy half and was tackled high by Jaeden Foua. From the resulting penalty Howick went on the attack and Darius Niumata dummied his way over from 10 metres out but the conversion from close range was missed by Setefano meaning the scores were tied 10-10. Howick then received two penalties for tackle infringements and on the last tackle Setefano put up a chip bomb which came down on the Raiders try line with Rylan Muaulu leaping above the defenders to catch it and plant it over the line to put Howick in front 14-10. In the final minute of the first half Hibiscus Coast put up a bomb which was dropped and from the resulting broken play Te Awa Marino picked it up and passed to Isaiah Inamata, who offloaded in a tackle to Taylor Raj, who sent Taine Tekiri-Ryan in to level the scores once more on halftime. In the 55th minute the Raiders took the lead once more when they attacked the left edge from close range and Peter Kengike created an overlap with Taine TeKiri-Ryan crossing for his second try in the left corner. Howick came close to scoring a few times but the Raiders defence held over the next ten minutes before Hibiscus Coast got on attack through two play the ball infringements by Howick. With another shift the left the Raiders created an overlap for Tekiri-Ryan getting his hat trick in the corner. Snowden missed the conversion but the Raiders now held a 24-14 lead with just eight minutes to play. However from the kickoff Nathan Austen played the ball incorrectly 15 metres from his line and Youngblood Doyle scored in the right corner a minute later for Howick. Setefano's conversion missed and despite their best efforts they were unable to find a potential equalising try and the Raiders hung on to win the Sharman Cup for the third time in their history and gain promotion to the Fox Memorial for 2027.

15 August	Hibiscus Coast	24-18 (14-10)	Howick	North Harbour Stadium
2:45	Try: Tipene Snowden (9m), Ian Mills (18m), Taine Tekiri-Ryan 3 (40m, 55m, 70m); Con: Notana Snowden 2/5 (11m, 57m)		Try: Josh Setefano (6m), Darius Niumata (28m), Rylan Muaulu (33m), Youngblood Doyle (73m); Con: Josh Setefano 1/4 (7m)	Referee: David Millar, TJ's: Keven Ah Ken & Brent Newton

Team details

FB	1	Korey Craig
WG	2	Taine Tekiri-Ryan
CE	3	Peter Kengike
CE	4	Tevita Kengike
WG	5	Alipate Liava'a
SO	6	Taylor Raj
HB	7	Notana Snowden
PR	8	Nathan Austen
HK	9	Tipene Snowden
PR	10	Jaeden Foua
SR	11	Kavana Te Kiri-Ryan
SR	12	Ian Mills
LF	13	Te Awa Marino
Substitutes:
SB	14	Jesse Heke
SB	15	Taine Clerke
SB	16	Shaun Nielsen
SB	17	Isaiah Inamata
SB	18	Cory Levien
Coach: Jeremy Heteraka
Manager: Natasha Stil and Seth Gleeson

FB	1	Mase Carson
WG	2	Peter Heretama-Wikaire
CE	3	Mason Te Rore
CE	4	Rylan Muaulu
WG	5	Youngblood Doyle (VC)
SO	6	Josh Setefano
HB	7	Darius Niumata
PR	8	Tony Tuia
HK	9	Jethro Friend
PR	10	Clayton Wiliams (C)
SR	11	Justin Reynolds
SR	12	Rick Piper
LF	13	Va Tuimoala
Substitutes:
SB	14	Reuben Toa
SB	15	Lau Aso
SB	16	Raven Penu
SB	17	Mo Manu
SB	18	Nui Andrews
SB	19	Xander Mahu-Delamere
Head Coach: Blake Ewe
Assistant Coach: Ernie Delamere

=== Full season top try scorers and point scorers ===
The points details were taken from the Auckland Rugby League website scoring which had some matches with unknown scoring details. They included 36 unattributed points to Mangere East, 6 for Te Atatu, 82 for Howick, 40 for Manurewa, 40 for Northcote, and 20 for Glenora and as a result the below statistics are not 100% accurate for those six teams.

==== Full season top point scorers ====
Top point scorers
No	Player	Team	T	C	P	DG	Pts
1	Makalani Hakalo	Otara	8	43	3	0	124
2=	Joshua Setefano	Howick	8	32	1	2	100
2=	Notana Snowden	Hibiscus Coast	3	44	0	0	100
4	Korey Craig	Hibiscus Coast	24	0	0	0	96
5	Nathan Simmons	Manurewa	3	28	1	0	70
6=	Filipo Utai	Otara	16	2	0	0	68
6=	Titanian Palei	Otara	12	9	1	0	68
8=	Tipene Snowden	Hibiscus Coast	8	11	1	0	56
8=	John Taupau	Mangere East	4	20	0	0	56
10	Nickolas Lythgo	Northcote	0	23	1	0	48

==== Full season top try scorers ====
Top try scorers
No	Player	Team	Tries
1	Korey Craig	Hibiscus Coast	24
2	Filipo Utai	Otara	16
3	Titanian Palei	Otara	12
4=	Naiki Paniora	Te Atatu	10
4=	Taine Tekiri-Ryan	Hibiscus Coast	10
6=	Cody Jones	Hibiscus Coast	9
6=	Tevita Kengike	Mangere East	9
7=	Jeremiah Tamatimu	Manurewa	8
7=	Nukurua Ngere	Mangere East	8
7=	Elijah Solomona	Manurewa	8
7=	Ronnie Lui Laumatia	Glenora	8
7=	Justin Reynolds	Howick	8
7=	Josh Setefano	Hibiscus Coast	8
7=	Tipene Snowden	Hibiscus Coast	8
7=	Makalani Hakolo	Otara	8

=== Phelan Shield ===
==== Standings ====
Team	Pld	W	D	L	B	F	A	PD	Pts
Richmond Bulldogs	12	12	0	0	3	424	234	+190	24
Pakuranga Jaguars	12	7	0	5	3	342	324	+18	14
Ellerslie Eagles	12	6	1	5	3	354	314	+40	13
Waitemata Seagulls	12	4	0	8	3	318	378	-60	8
East Coast Bays Barricudas	12	2	1	9	3	238	438	-200	5

==== Fixtures and Results ====
===== Round 1 =====
Ellerslie outscored Pauranga 6 tries to 5 however their inability to convert a single one of them cost them at least a draw.

25 April	Ellerslie	24-26 (16-16)	Pakuranga	Ellerslie Domain 1, Ellerslie
2:30	Try: Kaedan Charlie (5m), Khobi Pekepo 2 (7m, 35m), Ethaniel Tuigamala-Leaupepe (25m), Samson Matika (44m), Makesi Alai (51m)		Try: Stanley Kuka (10m), Dylan Mana (18m), Khasey Rawiri (30m), Samuel Ilaiu (56m), Timothy Samiu (69m); Con: Stanley Kuka 3/5 (18m, 31m, 57m)	Referee: David Devonshire

25 April	Waitemata	46-18	East Coast Bays	Ranui Domain 1, Ranui
2:30	Try: Richard-Tom-Tino-How, Dason Masiutama, Renaldo Haere-Brown, Norman Iopu, Amaru Moutira, Leolo Fetu Mapu 2, Reagan Leoso-Fraser; Con: Sevele Fainu 3, Amaru Moutira 4		Try: Unknown x 3 Con: Unknown x 3	Referee: Kemo Teariki

===== Round 2 =====
2 May	Ellerslie	14-22 (8-10)	Richmond	Ellerslie Domain 1, Ellerslie
2:30	Try: Kaedan Charlie 2 (8m, 50m), Levi Charlie (13m); Con: Samson Matika (50m)		Try: Jodacee Robertson (25m), Viliami Finau (35m), Christopher Pepa (44m), Reiley Satele (73m); Con: Nutimeki Maveu Pola’apau 3/4 (25m, 71m, 75m)	Referee: David Devonshire

2 May	East Coast Bays	20-40 (6-18)	Pakuranga	Freyberg 1, Browns Bay
2:30	Try: Graham Harris (35m), Bruce Grey 2 (53m, 72m), TeWaa Spicer (76m); Con: Bruce Grey 2/4 (35m, 77m)		Try: Reece Richmond (12m), Aramus Nevalagi 4 (19m, 24m, 68m, 80), Manu Tukia 2 (37m, 46m), Tua Tevaga (63m); Con: Stanley Kuka 2 (25m, 80m), Samuel Ilaiu 2 (47m, 65m)	Referee: TBC

===== Round 3 =====
9 May	Richmond	40-36 (24-10)	Waitemata	Grey Lynn Park 2, Grey Lynn
2:30	Try: Sam Taunga (9m), Albert Talakai 2 (11m, 55m), Joshua Talataina (23m), Leon Latoa (34m), Brandyn Tupou-Leauanne (42m), Jodacee Robertson (51m); Con: Nutimeki Maveu Pola'apau 6 (9m, 14m, 25m, 36m, 43m, 57m)		Try: Unknown (15m), Unknown (39m), Unknown (45m), Unknown (59m), Unknown (71m), Unknown (76m), Unknown (80m); Con: Unknown (17m, 47m, 72m, 80m)	Referee: Ngaone Sefo

9 May	Ellerslie	54-24 (28-10)	East Coast Bays	Ellerslie Domain 1, Ellerslie
2:30	Try: Samson Matika 2 (2m, 67m), Tevita Vatuvei (5m), Jonathan Taurarii (7m), Samuel Hansen (34m), Thomas Zachan (37m), Hamatia Crichton 3 (45m, 63m, 76m), Levi Charlie (54m); Con: Samson Matika 5 (2m, 5m, 35m, 38m, 77m), Hamatia Crichton 2 (46m, 65m)		Try: John Faaee (16m), Adam Davies (40m), Trent Bray (46m), Graham Harris (63m), Kayne Puru (78m); Con: Bruce Grey 2 (40m, 47m)	Referee: Kone Lavea

===== Round 4 =====
16 May	East Coast Bays	20-36 (8-30)	Richmond	Freyberg Park 1, Browns Bay
2:30	Try: John Faaee 3 (26m, 52m, 79m), Joshua Hale (33m); Con: Graham Harris 2/4 (52m, 80m)		Try: Christopher Pepa (1m), Viliami Finau 2 (6m, 17m), Joshua Talataina (9m), Jodacee Robertson (13m), Taruna Kamoe Tupou (29m), Kavafau Nau (61m); Con: Nutimeki Maveu Pola'apau (7m, 18m, 30m, 62m)	Referee: Oliver Broadhead

16 May	Pakuranga	38-28 (10-16)	Waitemata	Ti Rakau Park 1, Pakuranga
2:30	Try: Aramus Nevalagi 3 (9m, 60m, 80m), Aigaalii Aigaalii (30m), Samuel Ilaiu (47m), Manu Tukia (71m), Timothy Samiu (77m); Con: Stanley Kuka 4/6 (10m, 31m, 72m, 78m), Samuel Ilaiu 1/1 (80m)		Try: Kyle Falekava Kava (3m), Derek Fatu 3 (7m, 27m, 59m), Jamazse Whittaker Masiutama (50m); Con: Sevele Fainu 4/5 (9m, 29m, 51m, 61m)	Referee: Abel Marsters

===== Round 5 =====
23 May	Richmond	38-28 (22-12)	Pakuranga	Grey Lynn Park 2, Grey Lynn
2:30	Try: Robert Davis (5m), Christopher Pepa (16m), Sam Taunga (22m), Julius Vaetaru (35m), Andre Nu'uali'tia (42m), Kavafau Nau (47m), Clyde Papalii (76m); Con: Nutimeki Maveu Pola'apau 5/8 (8m, 23m, 36m, 43m, 76m)		Try: Carlos Hakeai (28m), Aramus Nevalagi 2 (37m, 50m), Manu Tukia (60m), Duncan Edmonds (80m); Con: Stanley Kuka 4/5 (29m, 38m, 51m, 80m),	Referee: Simon Bailey

23 May	Waitemata	20-32 (0-20)	Ellerslie	Ranui Domain 1, Ranui
2:30	Try: Kyle Falekava Kava 2 (41m, 63m), Unknown (55m), Derek Fatu (78m); Con: Conrad Uaongo (42m), Unknown (56m)		Try: Thomas Zachan (12m), Ethaniel Tuigamala-Leaupepe (17m), Elijah Fatuleai (21m), Felise Ah-Chong 3 (32m, 46m, 49m); Con: Hamatia Crichton (13m), Samson Matika (34m), Jonathan Taurarii 2 (47m, 50m)	Referee: Eisley Brown

===== Round 6 =====
30 May	Ellerslie	50-14 (30-10)	Pakuranga	Ellerslie Domain 1, Ellerslie
2:30	Try: Samuel Alai-Stowers (7m, 64m), Ulysses Semisi (11m), Samuel Hansen 2 (24m, 30m), Felise Ah-Chong 3 (35m, 55m, 68m), Tumatauenga Brown (77m); Con: Samson Matika (9m), Jonathan Taurii 6 (11m, 25m, 31m, 36m, 57m, 79m)		Try: Manu Tukia 2 (2m, 71m), Azahryus Taofinu'u-Misiniu (16m); Con: Samuel Ilaiu (2m)	Referee: Michael Anelu

30 May	East Coast Bays	24-20 (6-8)	Waitemata	Freyburg Park 1, Browns Bay
2:30	Try: Joshua Hale, Kane Uenuku, Nikora Puhi-Royal; Con: Bruce Grey 3 Pen: Bruce Grey 3		Try: Mokoi To'angutu, Kyle Falekava Kava 3 Con: Conrad Uaongo 2	Referee: Oliver Broadhead

===== Round 7 =====
6 June	Richmond	34-32 (12-14)	Ellerslie	Grey Lynn Park 2, Grey Lynn
2:30	Try: Joseph Kau (25m), Sione Pule (40m), Albert Talakai (45m), Diaz Taihia (54m), Clyde Papalii (58m), Julius Vaetaru (72m); Con: Nutimeki Maveu Pola'apau 5/6 (25m, 40m, 54m, 58m, 73m)		Try: Samuel Alai-Stowers (1m), Ethaniel Tuigamala Leaupepe 2 (16m, 63m), Samuel Hansen (20m), Agalei Letele (43m), Clinton Carter (67m); Con: Hamatia Crichton 4/6 (21m, 43m, 64m, 68m)	Referee: David Devonshire

6 June	Pakuranga	30-18 (22-4)	East Coast Bays	Ti Rakau Park 1, Pakuranga
2:30	Try: Stanley Kuka (19m), Carlos De'Har (23m), Samuel Ilaiu (27m), Azahyrus Taofinu'u-Misiniu (38m), Khasey Rawiri (70m); Con: Stanley Kuka 4/5 (20m, 25m, 27m, 71m); Pen: Stanley Kuka 1/1 (80m)		Try: Waikaretu Thompson (1m), Bruce Grey (46m), John Faaee (58m), Kayne Puru (66m); Con: Bruce Grey (47m)	Referee: Gabriel Thompson

===== Round 8 =====
Round 8 of the Phelan Shield saw two close matches. Waitemata led Richmond 20-18 after Moko To'angutu scored in the 61st minute but the unbeaten Richmond side scored three tries in 11 minutes to move out to a 32-16 lead before the home side scored a consolation try on full time. East Coast Bays secured an upset win over Ellerslie when they won 22-18 after trailing 6-8 at halftime.

13 June	Waitemata	24-32 (10-12)	Richmond	Rānui Domain 1, Rānui
2:30	Try: Leolo Fetu Mapu 2 (7m, 38m), Kyle Falekava Kava 2 (43m, 80m), Mokoi To'angutu (61m); Con: Amaru Moutira 2 (39m, 45m)		Try: Albert Takalai (4m), Sosefo Kei 2 (37m, 67m), Clyde Papalii (52m), Nutimeki Maveu Pola'apau (73m), Andre Nu'uali'itia (78m); Con: Nutimeki Maveu Pola'apau 4 (5m, 38m, 53m, 69m)	Referee: Mina Nomani

13 June	East Coast Bays	22-18 (6-8)	Ellerslie	Freyburg Park 1, Browns Bay
2:30	Try: Liam Thomas (20m), Graham Harris (59m), Harley Morehu (68m), Calvin Tipene (75m); Con: Bruce Grey (3 21m, 69m, 76m)		Try: Clinton Carter (26m), Hamatia Crichton 2 (35m, 52m), Ulysses Semisi (49m); Con: Hamatia Crichton (50m)	Referee: ?

===== Round 9 =====
20 June	Richmond	46-6 (22-0)	East Coast Bays	Grey Lynn Park 2
2:30	Try: Christopher Pepa 2 (4m, 40m), Albert Talakai 3 (17m, 57m, 71m), Clyde Papalii (24m), Nutimeki Maveu Pola'apau (32m), Reiley Satele (44m), Taruna Kamoe Tupou (76m); Con: Nutimeki Maveu Pola'apau (18m, 40m, 58m, 72m, 77m)		Try: Matthew Anirudh (53m); Con: Zach Johnston (53m)	Attendance: 150; Referee: David Devonshire

20 June	Waitemata	38-24 (14-10)	Pakuranga	Ranui Domain, Rānui
2:30	Try: Amaru Moutira (6m), Sevele Fainu (13m), Kyle Falekava Kava 3 (21m, 41m, 56m), Sosefo Fainu (65m), Abraham Vakai (69m); Con: Leolo Fetu Mapu 2 (14m, 42m), Sevele Fainu (58m), Amaru Moutira 2 (67m, 71m)		Try: Stanley Kuka 3 (26m, 62m, 79m), Samuel Ilaiu (34m), Manu Tukia (73m); Con: Stanley Kuka (27m), Samuel Ilaiu (80m)	Referee: Mina Nomani

===== Round 10 =====
27 June	Pakuranga	16-22 (10-16)	Richmond	Ti Rakau Park 1, Pakuranga
2:30	Try: Stanley Kuka (11m), Manu Tukia (15m), Aramus Nevalagi (53m); Con: Stanley Kuka 2 (12m, 55m)		Try: Nutimeki Pola'apau (1m), Reign Kamuhemu (4m), Kavafau Nau (37m), Taruna Tupou (48m); Con: Nutimeki Pola'apau 3 (5m, 39m, 50m)	Referee: Gabriel Thompson

27 June	Ellerslie	34-22 (12-10)	Waitemata	Ellerslie Domain 1, Ellerslie
2:30	Try: Thomas Zachan (5m), Ethan Tuigamala-Leaupepe (38m), Felise Ah-Chong 3 (51m, 59m, 74m), Samuel Alai-Stowers (68m); Con: Jonathan Taurarii 4 (7m, 39m, 52m, 61m), Hamatia Crichton (76m)		Try: Leolo Mapu (19m), Kyle Kava (27m), Amaru Moutira (43m), Sosefo Fainu (79m); Con: Leolo Mapu 3 (29m, 44m, 80m)	Referee: David Devonshire

===== Round 11 =====
4 July	Pakuranga	34-22 (10-12)	Ellerslie	Ti Rakau Park 1, Pakuranga
2:30	Try: Azahryus Taofinu'u-Misiniu 2 (29m, 33m), Nafetalai Kaivelata 2 (41m, 65m), Andrew Mana 2 (50m, 73m), Taniela Ngaue (76m); Con: Stanley Kuka 2 (34m, 42m), Dylan Mana (78m)		Try: Felise Ah-Chong 3 (1m, 46m, 70m), Samson Matika (36m); Con: Jonathan Taurarii 3/4 (2m, 37m, 71m)	Referee: David Devonshire

4 July	Waitemata	30-28 (18-10)	East Coast Bays	Ranui Domain 1, Rānui
2:30	Try: Sosefo Fainu (2m), Sevel Fainu (19m), Sweet Fotu (28m), Everitt Ryder (60m), Derek Fatu (70m); Con: Sevele Fainu (4m, 20m, 29m, 40m), Amaru Moutira (72m)		Try: John Faaee (23m), Matthew Anirudh (34m), Cameron Horvath (48m), Tarquin Court (65m), Dallas Rudolph-Karena (80m); Con: Bruce Grey (35m, 49m, 66m, 80m)	Referee: Kemo Teariki

===== Round 12 =====
11 July	Ellerslie	16-34 (4-14)	Richmond	Ellerslie Domain, Ellerslie
2:30	Try: Unknown, Agalei Letele (58m), Samson Matika (71m); Con: Jonathan Taurarii 2 (59m, 72m)		Try: Unknown x 7 Con: Unknown x 3

11 July	East Coast Bays	10-50 (4-26)	Pakuranga	Freyburg Park 1, Browns Bay
2:30	Try: Liam Thomas (35m), Zach Johnston (77m); Con: Graham Harris (78m)		Try: Manu Tukia (5m), Carlos Hakeai 5 (9m, 22m, 50m, 60m, 64m), Dylan Mana 2 (17m, 32m), Khasey Rawiri (57m), Conrad Purcell (72m); Con: Stanley Kuka 4 (10m, 24m, 33m, 41m), Carlos Hakeai (65m)

===== Round 13 =====
18 July	Richmond	56-12 (28-6)	Waitemata	Grey Lynn Park 2, Grey Lynn
2:30	Try: Tremain Tagamaka 2 (3m, 11m), Kyan Alo 3 (18m, 72m, 74m), Sione Pule 2 (25m, 80m), Julius Vaetaru 2 (27m, 45m), Alekisanita Nau (66m); Con: Nutimeki Maveu Pola'apau 4 (4m, 20m, 26m, 46m), Tuipala Faaee 3 (67m, 73m, 80m); Pen: Nutimeki Maveu Pola'apau (29m)		Try: Amaru Moutira (27m), Unknown (48m); Con: Sevele Fainu (28m), Unknown (80m)	Referee: Ngaone Sefo

18 July	Ellerslie	36-36 (22-18)	East Coast Bays	Ellerslie Domain 1, Ellerslie
2:30	Try: Filo-Manuao Aholelei (12m), Felise Ah-Chong 2 (24m, 39m), Samuel Hansen 2 (36m, 56m), Khobi Pekepo (46m), Ethaniel Tuigamala-Leaupepe (66m); Con: Jonathan Taurarii (16m, 38m, 40m, 57m)		Try: Bruce Grey (3m), Calvin Tipene (7m), Shawn Hickey 2 (28m, 41m), John Faaee 2 (33m, 51m), Dallas Rudolph-Karena (61m); Con: Bruce Grey (8m), Graham Harris 2 (52m, 63m); Pen: Graham Harris (75m)	Referee: Jordan Chand

===== Round 14 =====
25 July	East Coast Bays	12-32 (8-16)	Richmond	Freyberg Park 1, Browns Bay
2:30	Try: Jinto Tomoda (28m), Arikitohia Hood (42m), Shawn Hickey (61m)		Try: Kyan Alo 2 (3m, 75m), Gerar Vili (17m), Samisoni Vaioleti (22m), Kavafau Nau (52m), Julius Vaetaru (78m); Con: Tuipala Faaee (4m, 23m, 53m, 79m)	Referee: Oliver Broadhead

25 July	Pakuranga	32-14 (16-8)	Waitemata	Ti Rakau Park, Pakuranga
2:30	Try: Reece Richmond (14m), Pacharawich Saisiri (32m), Carlos Hakeai 3 (41m, 60m, 65m), Andrew Mana (46m), Con: Stanley Kuka 4/6 (20m, 42m, 48m, 66m)		Try: De'Yonte Soloma (17m), Unknown (29m), Jamazse Whittaker Masiutama (70m); Con: Unknown (70m)	Referee: David Devonshire

===== Round 15 =====
1 August	Richmond	40-10 (6-6)	Pakuranga	Grey Lynn Park 2, Grey Lynn
2:30	Try: Diaz Taihia 2 (7m, 61m), Andre Nu'uali'itia (43m), Riley Satele (51m), Kyan Alo (57m), Tuipala Faaee (64m), Sosefo Kei (73m); Con: Nutimeki Maveu Pola'apau 6/7 (8m, 44m, 58m, 62m, 66m, 74m)		Try: Carlos De'Har (24m), Tumua Tuifao (70m); Con: Stanley Kuka 1/2 (26m)	Referee: Aaron Kesha

1 August	Waitemata	28-20 (6-8)	Ellerslie	Ranui Domain 2, Rānui
2:30	Try: Sweet Fotu 2 (23m, 41m), Richard-Tom Tino-How (68m), Vaea Fainu (75m), Everitt Ryder (79m); Con: Mikaere Marshall 3 (24m, 77m, 80m), Sweet Fotu (43m)		Try: Ethaniel Tuigamala-Leaupepe (6m), Ale Amosa (32m), Filo-Manuao Aholelei (57m), Agalei Letele (61m); Con: Sooalofaina Tamilo (58m, 62m)	Referee: David Devonshire

===== Playoffs =====
====== Semi Finals ======
8 August	Richmond	40-12 (6-6)	Waitemata	Grey Lynn Park 2, Grey Lynn
2:30	Try: Andre Nu'uali'itia (38m), Alekisanita Nau (41m), Mose Newton 2 (43m, 80m), Christopher Pepa (49m), Tuipala Faaee (60m), Julius Vaetaru (75m), Albert Talakai (78m); Con: Nutimeki Maveu Pola'apau (39m, 42m, 60m, 79m)		Try: Derek Fatu (34m), Norman Iopu (70m); Con: Sevele Fainu 1/1 (36m), Conrad Uaongo 1/1 (71m)	Referee: Davey Misileki, TJ's: Paul Lorigan & TBC

8 August	Pakuranga	20-20 (6-10) *22-20 (aet)	Ellerslie	Ti Rakau Park 1, Pakuranga
2:30	Try: Aramus Nevalagi 3 (11m, 41m, 49m), Reece Richmond (62m); Con: Stanley Kuka 2/4 (13m, 42m); Pen: Stanley Kuka 1/1 (90m)		Try: Hamatia Crichton (26m), Felise Ah-Chong 2 (31m, 51m), Filo-Manuao Aholelei (62m); Con: Sooalofaina Tamilo (32m, 64m)	Referee: Aaron Kesha, TJ's: Oliver Boradhead & Curtis Wharewaka

====== Grand Final ======
15 August	Richmond	26-12 (16-0)	Pakuranga	North Harbour Stadium 1, Albany
12:15	Try: Christopher Pepa 2 (12m, 50m), Sosefo Kei (16m), Julius Vaetaru (26m), Kavafau Nau (80m); Con: Nutimeki Maveu Pola'apau 3/5 (13m, 27m, 80m)		Try: Carlos Hakeai (60m), Dylan Mana (66m); Con: Stanley Kuka 2/2 (61m, 68m)	Referee: Aaron Kesha, TJ's: Davey Misileki & Kahi Thompson

Team details

FB	1	Kyan Alo
WG	2	Christopher Pepa
CE	3	Gerar Vili
CE	4	Albert Talakai
WG	5	Mose Newton
SO	6	Julius Vaetaru
HB	7 (9)	Kavafau Nau
PR	8 (10)	Andre Nu'uali'itia
HK	9 (11)	Nutimeki Maveu Pola'apau
PR	10(13)	Robert Davis
SR	11(8)	Brandyn Tupou-Leauanne
SR	12(12)	Alekisanita Nau
LK	13(14)	Tuipala Faaee
Emergency:
SB	15	Leon Leota
SB	16	Diaz Taihia
SB	17	Reiley Satele (C)
SB	18	Sosefo Kei
SB	21	Sione Pule
Coach: Henri Nicholas
Assistant Coach: Geoff Morton
Manager: Alexia Aoina

FB	1	Carlos De'Har
WG	2(10)	Aydan Chitty
CE	3(2)	Aramus Nevalagi
CE	4	Reece Richmond
WG	5(6)	Dylan Mana
SO	6(7)	Bronson Kingi
HB	7(8)	Duncan Edmonds
PR	8(11)	Stanley Kuka
HK	9(12)	Samuel Ilaiu
PR	10(13)	Dennis Tuagalu
SR	11(15)	Azahyrus Taofinu'u-Misiniu
SR	12(16)	Mason Wilson-Fa'aofo
LK	13(17)	Andrew Mana
Substitutes:
SB	14(18)	Nafetalai Kaivelata
SB	15(19)	Taniela Ngaue
SB	16(20)	Josiah Wright
SB	17(21)	Jared Nuku
SB	18(22)	Carlos Hakeai
Head Coach: Gary Kingi
Assistant Coach: Benjamin Arakua
Managers: Chrystal Mana and Valarie Tongia

=== Full season top try scorers and point scorers ===
The points details were taken from the Auckland Rugby League website scoring which had some matches with unknown scoring details. Unknown points are Richmond (34), Ellerslie (4), Waitemata (54), and East Coast Bays (18).

==== Full season top point scorers ====
Top point scorers
No	Player	Team	T	C	P	DG	Pts
1	Nutimeki Maveu Pola'apau	Richmond	3	52	1	0	118
2	Stanley Kuka	Pakuranga	6	35	2	0	98
3	Felise Ah-Chong	Ellerslie	16	0	0	0	64
4	Bruce Grey	East Coast Bays	4	16	3	0	54
5	Aramus Nevalagi	Pakuranga	13	0	0	0	52
6	Kyle Falekava Kava	Waitemata	12	0	0	0	48
7	Jonathan Taurarii	Ellerslie	1	21	0	0	46
8	Hamatia Crichton	Ellerslie	6	9	0	0	42
9	Carlos Hakeai	Pakuranga	10	1	0	0	42
10=	Manu Tukia	Pakuranga	9	0	0	0	36
10=	Samson Matika	Ellerslie	5	8	0	0	36
10=	Sevele Fainu	Waitemata	2	14	0	0	36

==== Full season top try scorers ====
Top try scorers
No	Player	Team	Tries
1	Felise Ah-Chong	Ellerslie	16
2	Aramus Nevalagi	Pakuranga	13
3	Kyle Falekava Kava	Waitemata	12
4=	Carlos Hakeai	Pakuranga	10
4=	Manu Tukia	Pakuranga	9
6=	John Faaee	East Coast Bays	8
6=	Albert Talakai	Richmond	8
6=	Christopher Pepa	Richmond	8
9=	Ethaniel Tuigamala-Leaupepe	Ellerslie	7
9=	Julius Vaetaru	Richmond	7

=== Championship Women ===
==== Standings ====
The standings recorded byes as default wins which distorted the win records.

Team	Pld	W	D	L	B	F	A	PD	Pts
Otara Women	8	6	1	1	1	96	52	+44	15
Waitemata Women	8	5	2	1	1	94	62	+32	13
Richmond Roses Championship	9	4	0	5	0	44	120	-76	8

==== Final ====
26 July	Otara Women	14-8 (10-0)	Waitemata Women	Ngati Ōtara Park 1
2:30	Try: Maraea Kahui (3m), Vaine Schwenke (27m), Michelle-Manukia-Savelio (44m); Con: Tahlia Aoake (4m)		Try: Enereta Timu (35m), Isadora Kini (53m)	Referee: Tameilau Pauuvale, TJ's: Taura Taura & Moses Luke Ripia

=== Fox Memorial Premier Reserve Grade ===
==== Standings ====
Team	Pld	W	D	L	Def	F	A	PD	Pts
Manukau	14	11	0	3	0	564	252	+312	22
Otahuhu	14	10	0	4	0	550	222	+328	20
Mt Albert	14	10	0	4	0	479	276	+203	20
Point Chevalier	14	9	0	5	0	598	309	+289	18
Papakura	14	9	0	5	0	486	318	+168	18
Bay Roskill	14	4	0	10	0	398	545	-56	8
Marist	14	2	0	12	1	196	739	-543	4
Ponsonby	14	1	0	13	1	233	934	-701	20

==== Final ====
15 August	Manukau	18-16 (12-12)	Otahuhu	Moyle Park 1, Māngere East
2:30	Try: Theodore Maui (1m), Paea Fotu (6m), Tyrone Waipouri (77m); Con: Tyrone Waipouri 3/3 (2m, 8m, 79m)		Try: Laeiau Sio (4m), Maddison Tekeu (14m), Joshua Cooper (54m); Con: Laeiau Sio (5m, 15m)

=== Sharman Cup Premier Reserve Grade ===
==== Standings ====
Team	Pld	W	D	L	B	F	A	PD	Pts
Otara	14	12	0	2	0	518	340	-178	24
Manurewa	14	12	0	2	0	444	272	+172	24
Mangere East	14	7	2	5	0	428	300	+128	16
Hibiscus Coast	14	7	0	7	0	434	330	+104	14
Te Atatu	14	6	1	7	0	386	344	+42	13
Howick	14	3	2	9	0	308	510	-202	8
Glenora	14	3	1	10	0	243	522	-279	7
Northcote	14	3	0	11	0	320	463	-143	7

==== Final ====
16 August	Otara	26-24 (12-12)	Mangere East	Ngāti Ōtara Park 1, Ōtara
2:30	Try: Peter Palalii (20m), Robin-John Kamana (32m), Ansley Pua 2 (64m, 69m); Con: Robin-John Kamana 1/1 (21m), Tagasia Fulutusi 1/1 (34m), Tagasia Fulutusi 2/2 (65m, 70m); Pen: Tagasia Fulutusi 1/1 (80m)		Try: Robert Lauhingoa (9m), George Tapu 2 (11m, 51m), Lenin Simi (55m); Con: George Tapu 4/4 (10m, 13m, 53m, 57m)

=== Under 18 Boys ===
==== Standings ====
These included carry over points after Mt Albert and Marist teams dropped out of the competition after a few rounds.

Team	Pld	W	D	L	B	F	A	PD	Pts
Otara Rams	9	8	0	1	366	86	+280	16	
Otahuhu Blue	9	8	0	1	340	110	+230	16	
Glenora Keli Bears	9	6	0	3	326	130	+196	12	
Otara New Era	9	6	0	3	262	172	+90	12	
Ellerslie East Eagles	9	5	0	4	276	224	+52	10	
Te Iti Reearea	9	5	0	4	216	252	-36	10	
Richmond Rovers	9	1	0	8	136	398	+262	2	

==== Under 18 Boys Final ====
25 July	Otara Rams	48-16	Glenora Keli Bears	Ngati Ōtara Park 1
2:30	Try: Unknown		Try: Unknown	Referee: Kahi Thompson, TJ's: Taura Taura and Moses Luke Ripia

=== Under 18 Girls ===
==== Standings ====
Team	Pld	W	D	L	F	A	PD	Pts
Manurewa Marlins (U18 Women)	10	10	0	0	466	36	+430	20
Mangere East Hawks Girls	10	6	0	4	208	234	-26	12
Richmond Rosebuds	10	4	0	6	232	192	+40	8
Papatoetoe Panthers U18 Ladies	10	0	0	10	48	492	-444	0

==== Under 18 Girls Final ====
25 July	Manurewa U18 Women	32-4	Mangere East Hawks Girls	Mountfort Park: Jack Shelly Field, Manurewa
2:30	Try: Unknown		Try: Unknown	Referee: Poriau Uamaki, TJ's: Saane Mosaati & Dion Griffiths

=== Under 17 Boys ===
==== Standings ====
Team	Pld	W	D	L	F	A	PD	Pts
U17 Otablu Leapards	11	11	0	0	436	40	+396	22
Papatoetoe Panthers U17 Boys	11	9	0	2	410	100	+310	18
Mt Albert U17B RC	11	8	0	3	348	138	+210	16
Manurewa Marlins	11	8	0	3	270	166	+104	16
Mangere East Hawks Boys	11	6	0	5	338	180	+158	12
Bay Roskill Vikings 17s	11	4	2	5	252	336	-84	10
Mt Albert U17B Glenfield Mt Albert	11	4	1	6	230	230	+0	9
Howick Brothers	11	2	0	9	74	526	-452	9
Papakura Kura Hard	11	1	1	9	94	406	-312	3

==== Under 17 Boys Final ====
9 August	Otablu Leopards	34-10 (12-4)	Mt Albert U17B RC	Cornwall Park 1, Epsom
12:30	Try: #5 (5m), #2 (9m, 46m), #4 (19m), #14 (42m), #3 (57m), #22 (64m), #17 (68m); Con: #7 0/4, #9 0/2, #12 1/2 (66m)		Try: #2? (28m), #? (51m); Con: #7 1/2 (42m)	Referee: Casey Gribble, TJ's: Kahi Thompson & Poriau Uamaki

=== Under 16 Boys ===
==== Standings ====
Team	Pld	W	D	L	F	A	PD	Pts
U17 Otablu Leapards	11	11	0	0	436	40	+396	22
Papatoetoe Panthers U17 Boys	11	9	0	2	410	100	+310	18
Mt Albert U17B RC	11	8	0	3	348	138	+210	16
Manurewa Marlins	11	8	0	3	270	166	+104	16
Mangere East Hawks Boys	11	6	0	5	338	180	+158	12
Bay Roskill Vikings 17s	11	4	2	5	252	336	-84	10
Mt Albert U17B Glenfield Mt Albert	11	4	1	6	230	230	+0	9
Howick Brothers	11	2	0	9	74	526	-452	9
Papakura Kura Hard	11	1	1	9	94	406	-312	3

==== Under 16 Boys Final ====
9 August	Otara	20-16 (12-10)	Glenora Westside Bears	Cornwall Park 1, Epsom
11:15	Try: #1 (6m, 10m), #13 (29m), #2 (53m); Con: #7 1/4 (55m); Pen: #7 1/2 (67m)		Try: #20 (15m), #13 (22m), #12 (60m); Con: #13 2/3 (23m, 60m)	Referee: Liam Clayton, TJ's: Kahi Thompson & Michael Une

=== Under 16 Girls (Fanamanu Davies Cup) ===
==== Standings ====
Team	Pld	W	D	L	F	A	PD	Pts
Mangere East Black Hawks	11	11	0	0	496	64	+432	22
Manurewa Marlins Magic	11	10	0	1	356	110	+246	20
Otahuhu Sisters	11	8	1	2	244	148	+96	17
Te Atatu Roosters Kōtiro	11	7	1	3	342	144	+198	15
Mangere East Hawks Girls	11	7	0	4	334	158	+176	14
Richmond Rosebuds U16s	11	5	1	5	260	178	+82	11
Manurewa Marlins	11	4	0	7	366	86	+280	8
New Lynn Stags Valkyries Mana U16	11	4	0	7	164	250	-86	8
Otara Stylaz	11	3	2	6	150	296	-146	8
Mt Albert Lionesses U16	11	2	1	8	122	426	-304	5
Ellerslie Eagles Wings of Fire	11	2	0	9	68	422	-354	4

==== Under 16 Girls Final ====
The grand final was live streamed by bartv.

1 August	Mangere East	32-18 (26-0)	Mangere East	Cornwall Park 1
12:30	Try: Number 6 (3m), Number 3 (6m, 62m), Number 5 (12m), Number 2 (15m, 30m); Con: Number 9 4/6 (6m, 17m, 31m, 63m)		Try: Number 5 (43m, 52m), Number 18 (56m); Con: Number 3 3/3 (44m, 53m, 57m)

=== Under 15 Boys ===
==== Standings ====
===== Section A =====
Team	Pld	W	D	L	F	A	PD	Pts
Point Chevalier Revenge Pirates	10	10	0	0	400	34	+366	20
Mangere East Razor Hawks	10	8	0	2	294	112	+182	16
Manurewa Marlins Mayhem	10	7	0	3	290	115	-80	14
Otahuhu Leopards	10	6	0	4	211	140	+71	12
Te Atatu Roosters Tama	10	3	0	7	194	274	-80	6
Marist Saints	10	3	0	7	124	258	-134	6
Mangere East Sky Hawks	10	3	0	7	118	318	-200	6

==== Under 15 Boys Section A Final ====
The grand final was live streamed by bartv.

9 August	Pt Chevalier Revenge Pirates	28-16 (18-0)	Manurewa Marlins Mayhem	Cornwall Park 1, Epsom
9:30	Try: Number 2 (5m), Number 10 (10m), Number 4 (14m, 20m), Number 7 (54m), Number 2 (59m); Con: Number 6 2/5 (11m, 55m), Number 7 0/1		Try: Number 5 (37m), Number 9 (53m), Number 8 (47m); Con: Number 5 0/1, Number 12 2/2 (44m, 48m)	Referee: Oliver Broadhead, TJ's: Taura Taura & Casey Gribble

===== Section B =====
Team	Pld	W	D	L	F	A	PD	Pts
Papakura Sea Eagles Maroon	10	9	0	1	460	96	+364	18
Otara Scopion Kingz	10	7	0	3	300	138	+162	14
Papakura U15	10	7	0	3	282	138	+162	14
Manurewa Marlin Brothers	10	3	0	7	178	304	-126	6
Bay Roskill Vikings	10	2	1	7	146	350	-204	5
Mt Albert Lions	10	2	1	7	102	362	-260	5

==== Under 15 Boys Section B Final ====
The grand final was live streamed by bartv.

9 August	Papakura Maroon	28-10 (12-6)	Papakura U15	Cornwall Park 2, Epsom
9:30	Try: Number 9 (8m), Number 4 (19m, 48m, 58m), Number 17 (39m), Number 3 (55m); Con: Number 6 2/3 (9m, 20m), Number 7 0/3		Try: Number 8 (28m), Number 5 (44m); Con: Number 2 1/2 (29m)	Referee: Michael Une, TJ's: Dayton Ryan & Moses Luke Ripia

=== Under 13 Girls ===
==== Standings ====
Team	Pld	W	D	L	F	A	PD	Pts
New Lynn Stags Valkyries Toki U13	10	10	0	0	340	22	+318	20
Manurewa Marlins Maidens	10	8	0	2	258	96	+162	16
Mangere East Lightning Black Hawks	10	8	0	2	242	100	+142	16
Otara Wild Scorpions	10	6	0	4	198	118	+80	12
Papatoetoe Puma Ladies	10	6	0	4	176	164	+12	12
New Lynn Stags Valkyries Taiaha U13	10	6	0	4	112	118	-6	12
Richmond Rovers Rosebuds U13	10	3	0	7	148	218	-70	6
Waitemata Kōtiro Seagulls	10	2	0	8	84	268	-184	4
Mangere East Lightning Red Hawks	10	1	0	9	84	238	-54	8

==== Under 13 Girls Final ====
The grand final was live streamed by BarTV.

1 August	New Lynn Stags Valkyries Toki U13	16-12	Mangere East Lightning Black Hawks	Cornwall Park 1
12:30	Try: Number 9 (6m), Number 4 (15m), Number 1 (20m), Number 13 (50m); Con: Number 18 0/1, Number 14 0/2, Number 8 0/1		Try: Number 7 (25m), Number 13 (36m); Con: Number 13 2/2 (24m, 37m)	Referee: Liam Clayton

=== Representative Games ===
==== National Competition ====
The North Island Premiership was played over one weekend in Hawkes Bay at the Sports Park ground. As all teams had four games scheduled (two each day) the games were played in 30 minute halves. Counties Manukau were undefeated for the second year while Akarana Falcons suffered an upset loss to Waikato on day one. They made amends somewhat when they beat Auckland Vulcans on the morning of the second day but they missed out to their opponents on a top two finish due to a worse points differential. As a result Counties Manukau and Auckland Vulcans progressed through to the final with the winner to play the winner of the South Island Premiership which also featured Wellington.

===== Standings =====
Team	Pld	W	D	L	F	A	PD	Pts
Counties Manukau Stingrays	4	4	0	0	120	28	+92	8
Auckland Vulcans	4	2	0	2	136	56	+80	4
Akarana Falcons	4	2	0	2	132	66	+66	4
Waikato	4	2	0	2	70	112	-42	4
Bay of Plenty	4	0	0	4	0	196	-196	0

===== Pool Games =====
12 September	Waikato	12-54 (6-26)	Counties Manukau	Sports Park, Hawkes Bay: Sports Park 1
9:00	Try: Jayden Erihe-Etuale (14m), Mahaki-Jay Hetet-Wairau (37m); Con: Western Tahuri 2/2 (15m, 38m)		Try: Jeremiah Poutu 3 (2m, 5m, 50m), Antony Naitoko 3 (9m, 52m, 57m), Arthur Crichton (24m), Mosese Faeamani (27m), Kruz Tupou (31m), Brodie Strickland (47m); Con: Bostyn Hakaraia 7/10 (11m, 24m, 28m, 33m, 48m, 51m, 58m)	Referee: Chris McMillan, TJ's: Eisley Brown & Gabrial Thompson

Team details

FB	1	Rex Punga-Sullivan
WG	2	Keoni Albert
CE	3	Hikurangi Keen Sadlier
CE	4	Jayden Erihe-Etuale
WG	5	Levi Smith
FE	6	Western Tahuri
HB	7	Te Maia Huirama
PR	8	Sioeli Kaho
HK	9	Tiopira Soti
PR	10	Corban McLarin
SR	11	Stephen Trangmar
SR	12	Maiki Matiu
LF	13	Jayden Flood
Reserve: Sheldon Lambert
Reserve: Lance Taitoko
Reserve: Awatea Cherrington
Reserve: Mahaki-Jay Hetet-Wairau
Coaches: Eugene Davis & Heremaia Samson
Trainers: Adrian Te Rangi & Patara Berryman

FB	1	Fuamaila Gatapu
WG	2	Patolo Taito (sent off 42m)
CE	3	Bostyn Hakaraia
CE	4	Brodie Strickland
WG	5	Jeremiah Poutu
FE	6	Antony Naitoko
HB	7	Arthur Crichton
PR	8	Stedman Lefau-Sala
HK	9	Jethro Friend
PR	10	Jamel Hunt
SR	11	Mosese Faeamani
SR	12	Viliami Tahitu'a
LF	13	Joseph Price
Reserve: Kruz Tupou
Reserve: Terrell Lefau Sala
Reserve: Talitua Salima-Satuia
Reserve: Tyrone Waipouri
Reserve: Albert Vete
Coaches: Phil Gordon & Kevin Charlie
Manager: Val Liuaga
Trainers: Tristan Waipouri & Logan Rout
Medical: David Nonoa

12 September	Akarana	74-0 (48-0)	Bay of Plenty	Sports Park, Hawkes Bay: Sports Park 2
9:00	Try: Ezekial Davidson Faaiuaso 4 (1m, 3m, 39m, 41m), Samisoni Fatu (8m), Cassius Tia 3 (15m, 23m, 31m), Tevita Kengike 2 (18m, 26m), John Aitu (21m), Lani Graham-Taufa (45m), Li Taufoou (55m); Con: Cassius Tia 11/13 (1m, 4m, 10m, 17m, 20m, 22m, 25m, 27m, 42m, 46m, 56m)			Referee: Paki Parkinson

Team details

FB	1	John Aitu
WG	2	Kalepo Paualaisa
CE	3	Lani Graham-Taufa
CE	4	Tevita Kengike
WG	5	Ezekial Davidson Faaiuaso
FE	6	Zensei Inu
HB	7	Cassius Tia
PR	8	Siliga Kepaoa-Genauer
HK	9	Delano Atai
PR	10	Aston Fraser
SR	11	Rhys Wikitera
SR	12	Daniel Smith
LF	13	Albert Balchin
Reserve:Matagi-Blade Collins-Kamuhemu
Reserve:Li Taufoou
Reserve:Peter Kengike
Reserve:Jamie Jnr Te Whata
Reserve:Samisoni Fatu
Coaches: Frank Fuimaono, Maile Hufanga, and Francis Leger
Manager: Malu Schaaf
Medical: Dillon Lal

FB	1	Wehi Te Whaiti
WG	2	Douglas Jnr Unuwai
CE	3	Hawiri Katene
CE	4	Deyshawnray Leafwicky
WG	5	Harlem Awhitu
FE	6	James Leavai
HB	7	Johnson Peri
PR	8	Shayden Andrew
HK	9	Allan Rika
PR	10	Joseph Nuku
SR	11	Justyce Waea-Allan
SR	12	Natanielu Kerisiano
LF	13	Ziah Senior
Reserve:Epi Ronaki
Reserve:Haimona Te Nahu
Reserve:Caleb Lepaio Gamlen
Reserve:Riki Collier
Coaches: Damien White & Cherie Awatere
Managers: Cherie Awatere & Janina Hinemoa Henare

12 September	Auckland Vulcans	74-0 (36-0)	Bay of Plenty	Sports Park, Hawkes Bay: Sports Park 1
11:40	Try: Andre Kahui-Singh 2 (1m, 47m), Sefanaia Cowley-Lupo 2 (10m, 37m), Samuel Waterworth (14m), Kaes Daniels Strickland 2 (17m, 31m) Leti Muller (21m), Paea Fotu (23m), Tama Darlington (34m), Jamie Henry 2 (40m, 43m), Kahn Munokoa (55m); Con: Leti Muller 10/12 (2m, 12m, 15m, 18m, 22m, 25m, 35m, 42m, 44m, 48m), Tama Darlington 1/1 (57m)			Referee: Eisley Brown, TJ's: Paki Parkinson & ?

Team details

FB	1	Andre Kahui-Singh
WG	2	Sisi Toutai
CE	3	Jahrome Falemoe-Afamasaga
CE	4	Paea Fotu
WG	5	Kahn Munokoa
FE	6	Leti Muller
HB	7	Sefanaia Cowley-Lupo
PR	8	Shaun Tempest
HK	9	Desmond Toofohe
PR	10	Samuel Waterworth
SR	11	Tommy Beale
SR	12	Kaes Daniels-Strickland
LF	13	Clive Tuifua
Reserve:Tama Darlington
Reserve:Victor Kenese
Reserve:Jamie Henry
Reserve:John Matini
Reserve:George Tuihalangingin
Coach: Sioeli Makaui
Manager: Te Mina Vila
Trainer: Devon Latoa
Medical: Cameron Todd

FB	1	Wehi Te Whaiti
WG	2	Douglas Jnr Unuwai
CE	3	Hawira Katene
CE	4	Deyshawnray Leafwick
WG	5	Harlem Awhitu
FE	6	James Leavai
HB	7	Johnson Peri
PR	8	Shayden Andrew
HK	9	Allan Rika
PR	10	Joseph Nuku
SR	11	Justyce Waea-Allan
SR	12	Natanielu Kerisiano
LF	13	Ziah Senior
Reserve:Epi Ronaki
Reserve:Haimona Te Nahu
Reserve:Caleb Lepaio Gamlen
Reserve:Riki Collier
Coaches: Damien White & Cherie Awatere
Managers: Cherie Awatere & Janina Hinemoa Henare

12 September	Akarana	22-28 (16-4)	Waikato	Sports Park, Hawkes Bay: Sports Park 2
11:40	Try: Ezekial Davidson Faaiuaso (9m), Delano Atai (18m), Matagi-Blade Collins-Kamuhemu (29m), Maxwell Wichman (50m); Con: Cassius Tia (19m, 30m, 48m)		Try: Mahaki-Jay Hetet-Wairau (2m), Rex Punga-Sullivan 2 (31m, 37m), Levi Smith (55m), Matenga Taihuka (58m); Con: Western Tahuri 4/5 (34m, 39m, 56m, 59m)	Referee: Chris McMillan

Team details

FB	1	John Aitu
WG	2	Kalepo Paualaisa
CE	3	Lani Graham-Taufa
CE	4	Vincent Tupu
WG	5	Ezekial Davidson Faaiuso
FE	6	Zensei Inu
HB	7	Cassius Tia
PR	8	Li Taufoou
HK	9	Delano Atai
PR	10	Samison Fatu
SR	11	Rhys Wikitera
SR	12	Daniel Smith
LF	13	Albert Balchin
Reserve: Matagi-Blade Collins-Kamuhemu
Reserve: Maxwell Wichman
Reserve: Jamie Jnr Te Whata
Reserve: Victory Vevesi
Reserve: Sione Ngahe
Coaches: Frank Fuimaono, Maile Hufanga, and Francis Leger
Mangager: Malu Schaaf
Medical: Dillon Lal

FB	1	Rex Punga-Sullivan
WG	2	Keoni Albert
CE	3	Hikurangi Keen Sadlier
CE	4	Jayden Erihe-Etuale
WG	5	Levi Smith
FE	6	Western Tahuri
HB	7	Te Maia Huirama
PR	8	Turangahakoa Bramley
HK	9	Tiopira Soti
PR	10	Corban McLarin
SR	11	Mahaki-Jay Hetet-Wairau
SR	12	Maiki Matiu
LF	13	Jayden Flood
Reserve: Sheldon Lambert
Reserve: Lance Taitoko
Reserve: Matenga Taihuka
Reserve: Sioeli Kaho
Reserve: Kane Meta
Coaches: Eugene Davis & Heremaia Samson
Trainer: Adrian Te Rangi & Patara Berryman

12 September	Counties Manukau	26-4 (18-0)	Auckland Vulcans	Sports Park, Hawkes Bay: Sports Park 1
2:30	Try: Toaiti Ramsay (4m), Antony Naitoko 3 (9m, 52m, 59m), Albert Vete (15m), Bostyn Hakaraia (24m); Con: Bostyn Hakaraia (17m)		Try: Kahn Munokoa (32m)	Referee: Paki Parkinson

Team details

FB	1
WG	2	Antony Naitoko
CE	3	Siave Togoiu
CE	4	Tevita Mikaela
WG	5	Toaiti Ramsay
FE	6	Bostyn Hakaraia
HB	7	Arthur Crichton
PR	8	Stedman Lefau-Sala
HK	9	Jethro Friend
PR	10	Jamel Hunt
SR	11	Viliami Tahitu'a
SR	12	Mosese Faeamani
LF	13	Joseph Price
Reserve: Kruz Tupou
Reserve: Terrell Lefau Sala
Reserve: Talitua Salima-Satuia
Reserve: William Fakatoumafi
Reserve: Albert Vete
Reserve: Isileli Matalave
Coaches: Kevin Charlie & Phil Gordon
Manager: Val Luiaga
Trainers: Tristan Waipouri & Logan Rout
Medical: David Nonoa

FB	1	Andre Kahui-Singh
WG	2	Sisi Toutai
CE	3	Nixon Leaso
CE	4	Paea Fotu
WG	5	Kahn Munokoa
FE	6	Leti Muller
HB	7	Sefanaia Cowley-Lupo
PR	8	Shaun Tempest
HK	9	Desmond Toofohe
PR	10	Samuel Waterworth
SR	11	Victor Kenese
SR	12	Kaes Daniels Strickland
LF	13	Clive Tuifua
Reserve: Jahrome Falemoe-Afamasaga
Reserve: Tama Darlington
Reserve: Jamie Henry
Reserve: John Matini
Reserve: George Tuihalangingin
Coach: Sioeli Makaui
Manager: Te Mina Vila
Trainer: Devon Latoa
Medical: Cameron Todd

13 September	Akarana Falcons	24-22 (6-22)	Auckland Vulcans	Sports Park, Hawkes Bay: Sports Park 1
9:00	Try: Kalepo Paualaisa (29m), Maxwell Wichman (40m), James Jnr Te Whata (48m), Tevita Kengike (51m); Con: Casius Tia 4/4 (33m, 40m, 48m, 53m)		Try: Samuel Waterworth (2m), Desmond Toofohe 2 (6m, 11m), Kaes Daniles Strickland (19m); Con: Leti Muller 3/4 (3m, 8m, 19m)	Referee: Paki Parkinson, TJ's: Paki Ngaira & Chris McMillan

Team details

FB	1	John Aitu
WG	2	Kalepo Paualaisa
CE	3	Lani Graham-Taufa
CE	4	Tevita Kengike
WG	5	Maxwell Wichman
FE	6	Jamie Jnr Te Whata
HB	7	Cassius Tia
PR	8	Sione Ngahe
HK	9	Matagi-Blade Collins-Kamuhemu
PR	10	Aston Fraser
SR	11	Peter Kengike
SR	12	Daniel Smith
LF	13	Albert Balchin
Reserve: Ezekial Davidson Faaiuaso
Reserve: Siliga Kepaoa-Gebauer
Reserve: Delano Atai
Reserve: Rhys Wikitera
Reserve: Li Taufoou
Coaches: Frank Fuimaono, Maile Hufanga and Francis Leger
Manager: Malu Schaaf
Medical: Dillon Lal

FB	1	Andre Kahui-Singh
WG	2	Tumua Soo Choon
CE	3	Nixon Leaso
CE	4	Paea Fotu
WG	5	Kahn Munokoa
FE	6	Leti Muller
HB	7	Sefanaia Cowley-Lupo
PR	8	Shaun Tempest
HK	9	Desmond Toofohe
PR	10	Zinzan Fuimaono
SR	11	Victor Kenese
SR	12	Kaes Daniles Strickland
LF	13	Samuel Waterworth
Reserve: Sisi Toutai
Reserve: Jahrome Falemoe-Afamasaga
Reserve: Clive Tuifua
Reserve: Tama Darlington
Reserve: George Tuihalangingie
Coach: Sioeli Makaui
Manager: Te Mina Vila
Trainer: Devon Latoa
Medical: Cameron Todd

13 September	Bay of Plenty	LBD-WBD (0-24 default score)	Counties Manukau	Sports Park, Hawkes Bay: Sports Park 2
9:00				Referee: Keven Ah Ken, TJ's: Kahi Thompson & Liam Clayton

Team details

FB	1
WG	2
CE	3
CE	4
WG	5
FE	6
HB	7
PR	8
HK	9
PR	10
SR	11
SR	12
LF	13
Reserve:
Reserve:
Reserve:
Reserve:
Reserve:
Reserve:
Coaches:
Manager:
Trainers:
Medical:

FB	1
WG	2
CE	3
CE	4
WG	5
FE	6
HB	7
PR	8
HK	9
PR	10
SR	11
SR	12
LF	13
Reserve:
Reserve:
Reserve:
Reserve:
Reserve:
Coach:
Manager:
Trainer:
Medical:

13 September	Akarana Falcons	12-16 (0-10)	Counties Manukau	Sports Park, Hawkes Bay: Sports Park 1
11:40	Try: Ezekial Davidson Faaiuaso (32m), Kalepo Paualaisa (45m), Tevita Kengike (49m); Con: Leti Muller 0/3		Try: Jamel Hunt (4m), Jethro Friend (15m), Arthur Crichton (42m); Con: William Fakatoumafi 2/3 (6m, 44m)	Referee: Paki Parkinson, TJ's: Keven Ah Ken & Paki Ngaira

Team details

FB	1	John Aitu
WG	2	Kalepo Paualaisa
CE	3	Lani Graham-Taufa
CE	4	Tevita Kengike
WG	5	Ezekial Davidson Faaiuaso
FE	6	Jamie Jnr Te Whata
HB	7	Cassius Tia
PR	8	Siliga Kepaoa-Gebauer
HK	9	Matagi-Blade Collins-Kamuhemu
PR	10	Sione Ngahe
SR	11	Rhys Wikitera
SR	12	Daniel Smith
LF	13	Albert Balchin
Reserve: Delano Atai
Reserve: Aston Fraser
Reserve: Li Taufoou
Reserve: Peter Kengike
Reserve: Maxwell Wichman
Coaches: Frank Fuimaono, Maile Hufanga and Francis Leger
Manager: Malu Schaaf
Medical: Dillon Lal

FB	1	William Fakatoumafi
WG	2	Antony Naitoko
CE	3	Siave Togoiu
CE	4	Tevita Mikaela
WG	5	Toaiti Ramsay
FE	6	Bostyn Hakaraia
HB	7	Arthur Crichton
PR	8	Stedman Lefau-Sala
HK	9	Jethro Friend
PR	10	Jamel Hunt
SR	11	Viliami Tahitu'a
SR	12	Mosese Faeamani
LF	13	Joseph Price
Reserve: Kruz Tupou
Reserve: Terrell Lefau Sala
Reserve: Talitua Salima-Satuia
Reserve: Albert Vete
Reserve: Tony Tuia
Coaches: Kevin Charlie & Phil Gordon
Manager: Val Luiaga
Trainers: Tristan Waipouri & Logan Rout
Medical: David Nonoa

13 September	Auckland Vulcans	36-6 (16-0)	Waikato	Sports Park, Hawkes Bay: Sports Park 1
11:40	Try: Tumua Soo Choon 2 (5m, 55m), Kahn Munokoa (19m), Isaiah Sofa (23), Samuel Waterworth (45m), Nixon Leaso (48m), Sisi Toutai (52m); Con: Sefanaia Cowley-Lupo 4/7 (20m, 25m, 47m, 53m)		Try: Jayden Erihe-Etuale (31m); Con: Western Tahuri 1/1 (32m)	Referee: Chris McMillan, TJ's: Liam Clayton & Michael Une

Team details

FB	1	Kurtis Cooper
WG	2	Tumua Soo Choon
CE	3	Nixon Leaso
CE	4	Jamie Henry
WG	5	Kahn Munokoa
FE	6	Leti Muller
HB	7	Sefanaia Cowley-Lupo
PR	8	Shaun Tempest
HK	9	Desmond Toofohe
PR	10	Zinzan Fuimaono
SR	11	Jahrome Falamoe-Afamasaga
SR	12	Victor Kenese
LF	13	Samuel Waterworth
Reserve: Sisi Toutai
Reserve: Clive Tuifua
Reserve: Tama Darlington
Reserve: Isaiah Sofa
Reserve: George Tuihalagingie
Coaches: Sioeli Makaui
Manager: Te Mina Vila
Trainers: Devon Latoa
Medical: Cameron Todd

FB	1	Rex Punga-Sullivan
WG	2	Keoni Albert
CE	3	Hikurangi Keen Sadlier
CE	4	Jayden Erihe-Etuale
WG	5	Levi Smith
FE	6	Western Tahuri
HB	7	Te Maia Huirama
PR	8	Turangahakoa Bramley
HK	9	Tiopara Soti
PR	10	Corban McLarin
SR	11	Lance Taitoko
SR	12	Maiki Matiu
LF	13	Jayden Flood
Reserve: Awatea Cherrington
Reserve: Matenga Taihuka
Reserve: Mahaki-Jay Hetet-Wairau
Reserve: Sioeli Kaho
Reserve: Kane Meta
Coach: Eugene Davis
Manager: Heremaia Samson
Trainer: Adrian Te Rangi and Patara Berryman

===== Semi Finals =====
Toomua Soo Choon scoring for the Auckland Vulcans to put them 14-12 ahead against Canterbury.

Nixon Leaso crossing after recovering a short kick.

Sisi Toutai finishes off the Auckland Vulcans win with try in the final minutes.

William Fakatoumafi opening the scoring for Counties Manukau in their win over Otago.

Bostyn Hakaraia angling his way to the try line to put Counties Manukau 24-0 ahead.

William Fakatoumafi's second try after he took a short ball from Bostyn Hakaraia.

The Auckland Vulcans beat Canterbury Bulls following a strong fight back. They found themselves down 12-0 after 14 minutes when the South Island champions scored tries through Cyrus Timo-Latu and Amby Pulega, both of which were converted by Jimmy Rangiawha. The Vulcans first try came when Jamie Henry crossed and then second rower Samuel Waterworth crashed over underneath the posts with captain, Leti Muller's conversion narrowing the score to 12-10. The Vulcans had more try line pressure but the halftime siren blew with the Bulls still ahead. The Vulcans played with more physicality than their opponents and gradually wore them down, with Tumua Soo Choon crossing in the left corner to put the Vulcans ahead for the first time. Then Nixon Leaso gained possession from a messy kick gather near the Bulls line and ran around behind the posts with the conversion giving them a decisive 20-12 lead with ten minutes to go. They continued to put pressure on the Canterbury line and close to full time Sisi Toutai slid over in the right corner to complete the win and book the Vulcans a place in the final which was played the following day. The second semi-final between Counties Manukau Stingrays and Otago Whalers was totally one sided. The much larger Stringrays side physically dominated on attack and defense with Otago struggling to make any running metres and the strong running Stingrays backs and forwards were hard to put on the ground. William Fakatoumafi opened the scoring in just the 5th minute after a break and Tyrone Waipouri converted from in front. Waipouri scored himself after another period of dominance and he added the extras. Then just on halftime after another break, Counties Manukau shifted the ball from the play the ball with the defence scattered and Antony Naitoko ran in an easy try untouched to make it 16-0 at halftime. The second half saw strong running Jeremiah Poutu go over in the left corner and then Bostyn Hakaraia went on an angled run to score wide to the right. Hakaraia then threw a short ball to Fakatoumafi who ran a hole and beat the fullback scoring under the posts. Minutes later hard running Poutu crashed over from dummy half after Joseph Price had nearly reached the line, and with 13 minutes still remaining in the 60 minute game they went 42-0 ahead when Antony Naitoko crossed for his second. The Stingrays had a try disallowed for obstruction and threatened to add to their lead but Otago managed to hold them out over the final period. Counties Manukau moved on to play the Auckland Vulcans in the final the next day, while Otago played Canterbury in the 3rd/4th playoff.

26 September	Auckland Vulcans	24-12 (10-12)	Canterbury Bulls	Bruce Pulman Park Papakura
12:00	Try: Jamie Henry (18m), Samuel Waterworth (22m), Tumua Soo Choon (43m), Nixon Leaso (49m), Sisi Toutai (56m); Con: Leti Muller 2/5 (25m, 50m)		Try: Cyrus Timo-Latu (9m), Amby Pulega (13m); Con: Jimmy Rangiawha 2/2 (12m, 14m)	Attendance: 200; Referee: Jack Feavers

Team details

FB	1	Sefanaia Cowley-Lupo
WG	2	Sisi Toutai
CE	3	Paea Fotu
CE	4	Nixon Leaso
WG	5	Jamie Henry
FE	6	Leti Muller (captain)
HB	7	Tama Darlington
PR	8	Shaun Tempest
HK	9(23)	Desmond Toofohe (vice-captain)
PR	10(25)	George Tuihalangingie
SR	11	Tommy Beale
SR	12	Kaes Daniels Strickland
LF	13	Samuel Waterworth
Reserve:14 Andre Kahui-Singh
Reserve:16 Jahrome Afamasaga Falemoe
Reserve:17 Victor Kenese
Reserve:22 Tumua Soo Choon
Reserve24: Isaiah Sofa
Coach: Sioeli Makaui
Manager: Te Mina Vila
Trainer: Devon Latoa

FB	1(3)	Ken Tofilau
WG	2	Hayden Thompson
CE	3	D'Angelo Siu-Tauti
CE	4	Danny Samuelu-Latu
WG	5	Julius Mumuta
FE	6(20)	Jimmy Rangiawha
HB	7	Klayton Waikato
PR	8(23)	Harold Kolose
HK	9	Thomas Irving
PR	10(8)	Kyle Leka
SR	11	Sakiusa Lomani Kaya
SR	12(15)	Joel Leka
LF	13(17)	Cyrus Timo-Latu
Reserve:6 Tahemaka Nui
Reserve:13 Jamieson Ilalio
Reserve:14 Kyan Rosie
Reserve:19 Jochden Filimoehala
Reserve:22 Amby Pulega
Coach: Sean Spooner
Assistant Coach: Sam Kelso
Manager: Stacey Reriti
Trainers: Grant Downing
Assistant Trainer: Shane Amatea

26 September	Counties Manukau Stingrays	42-0 (16-0)	Otago Whalers	Bruce Pulman Park Papakura
2:00	Try: William Fakatoumafi 2 (4m, 44), Tyrone Waipouri (20m), Antony Naitoko 2 (29m, 47m), Jeremiah Poutu 2 (31m, 43m), Bostyn Hakaraia (37m); Con: Tyrone Waipouri 5/7 6m, 21m, 45m, 49m, 52m)			Attendance: 200; Referee: Paki Parkinson, TJ's: Chris McMillan & ?

Team details

FB	1	Fuamaila Gatapu
WG	2	Patolo Taito
CE	3(6)	Antony Naitoko
CE	4	Brodie Strickland
WG	5	Jeremiah Poutu
FE	6(20)	William Fakatoumafi
HB	7(18)	Tyrone Waipouri
PR	8	Stedman Lefau-Sala
HK	9(14)	Kruz Tupou
PR	10	Jamel Hunt (captain)
SR	11	Mosese Faeamani
SR	12(22)	Viliami Tahitu'a
LF	13	Joseph Price
Reserve:3 Bostyn Hakaraia
Reserve:16 Terrell Lefau Sala
Reserve:17 Talitua Salima-Satuia
Reserve:21 Albert Vete
Reserve:27 Tony Tuia
Reserve:29 Isileli Matalave
Coaches: Kevin Charlie & Phil Gordon
Manager: Val Luiaga
Trainers: Triston Waipouri & Logan Rout
Medical: David Nonoa

FB	1(3)	Lotu Solomona
WG	2	Mavae Manuika
CE	3(1)	Daniel Dam
CE	4(15)	Amalani Taiala
WG	5	Saimone Samate
FE	6(25)	Bill Temaka
HB	7	Caleb Leef
PR	8(22)	Fatai Koloi
HK	9(21)	Jak Morton
PR	10	Petelo Amato
SR	11	Daniel Muasika
SR	12(19)	Lucas Te Rangi
LF	13(12)	Joe Cooke (captain)
Reserve:4 Te Ava-A-Katu
Reserve:9 Waka Takiari
Reserve:20 Aifala Taelega
Reserve:23 Marcel Rosflender Taani
Reserve:24 Dominic Vaalotu
Coach: Dallas Wade
Manager: Cristy Watkins

===== 3rd/4th Place Playoff =====
27 September	Canterbury Bulls	44-10 (26-0)	Otago Whalers	Bruce Pulman Park Papakura
11:00	Try: Thomas Irving (7m), Solomone Leka (17m), Joel Leka 2 (21m, 29m) Julius Mumuta 2 (24m, 39m), Kyan Rosie (34m), Danny Samuela-Latu (49m); Con: Jimmy Rangiawha 6/8 (8m, 18m, 21m, 36m, 40m, 50m)		Try: Saimone Samate (54m), Waka Takiari (60m); Con: Caleb Leef 1/2 (60m)	Attendance: 200; Referee: Jack Feavers

Team details

FB	1	Ken Tofilau
WG	2	Hayden Thompson
CE	3(24)	D'Angelo Siu-Tauti
CE	4(21)	Danny Samuela-Latu
WG	5	Julius Mumuta
FE	6(20)	Jimmy Rangiawha
HB	7	Klayton Waikato
PR	8	Kyle Leka
HK	9	Thomas Irving
PR	10(12)	Solomone Leka
SR	11	Sakiusa Lomanikaya
SR	12(15)	Joel Leka
LF	13	Jamieson Ilalio
Reserve:6 Tahemaka Nui
Reserve:14 Kyan Rosie
Reserve:17 Cyrus Timo-Latu
Reserve:22 Amby Pulega
Coaches: Sean Spooner & Samuel Kelso
Manager: Stacey Reriti
Trainers: Grant Downing & Shane Tamatea

FB	1	Lotu Solomona
WG	2	Mavae Manuika
CE	3(4)	Te Ava-A-Katu
CE	4(15)	Amalani Taiala
WG	5	Saimone Samate
FE	6(25)	Bill Temaka
HB	7	Caleb Leef
PR	8	Matthan Schaaf
HK	9 (21)	Jak Morton
PR	10(20)	Aifala Taelega
SR	11	Daniel Muasika
SR	12(19)	Lucas Te Rangi
LF	13(12)	Joe Cooke (captain)
Reserve:9 Waka Takiari
Reserve:10 Petelo Amato
Reserve:14 Ratu Berwick
Reserve:16 Jacob Day
Reserve:23 Marcel Rosflender Taani
Coach: Dallas Wade
Manager: Cristy Watkins

===== Grand Final =====
The grand final was played in very windy conditions which favoured Counties-Manukau in the first half. Albert Vete crashed over in the 3rd minute. Then Antony Naitoko ran through to score in the 10th minute with both tries being converted by William Fakatoumafi. The game was then relatively even for the remainder of the half with both teams struggling to complete sets and a lot of penalties blown for various infringements. Then close to half time Andre Kahui-Singh stepped his way through some weak try line defence and Tama Darlington's conversion narrowed the margin to just 6 points at the break. The Vulcans went on to attack early in the second half but wasted their chances before Tommy Beale ran through a hole, beat the fullback and sent Tama Darlington in behind the posts and he leveled the scores with the conversion. From the kick off they attacked down the right side and Nixon Leaso made a break. From the play the ball Leti Muller put in a grubber kick which Albert Vete dropped and Kahn Munokoa gathered the loose ball and scored in the right corner. Sisi Toutai nearly ran 80 metres to score after picking up a loose ball but was chased down by William Fakatoumafi and tackled into touch. Then with 20 minutes remaining Paea Fotu picked up a short stab kick but was called offide by the linesman in a tight call. They kept the pressure up however and on the last tackle Leti Muller's kick was partially charged down by Antony Naitoko and Tommy Beale gathered the bouncing ball before turning it back on the inside to Samuel Waterworth who drew the fullback Fuamaila Gatapu and sent Kaes Daniels Strickland in under the posts in the 68th minute. With minutes remaining Counties-Manukau attacked and Antony Naitoko looked to have been tackled just short of the line but got back up and dived over. Despite the protests of the Vulcans players Paki Parkinson awarded the try and William Fakatoumafi judged the wind perfectly to curl the conversion over from wide to the left to narrow the score to 22-18. The Vulcans held on over the final few minutes and after an attempted drop goal by Sefanaia Cowley-Lupo went wide the siren sounded before the restart to hand them an upset win. Andre Kahui-Singh was awarded the man of the match.

27 September	Counties Manukau Stingrays	18-22 (12-6)	Auckland Vulcans	Bruce Pulman Park, Papakura
1:00	Try: Albert Vete (3m), Antony Naitoko 2 (10m, 76m); Con: William Fakatoumafi 3/3 (5m, 11m, 77m)		Try: Andre Kahui-Singh (36m), Tama Darlington (47m), Kahn Munokoa (50m), Kaes Daniels Strickland (68m); Con: Tama Darlington 3/4 (38m, 48m, 70m); Drop: Sefanaia Cowley-Lupo 0/1	Attendance: 250; Referee: Paki Parkinson

Team details

FB	1	Fuamaila Gatapu
WG	2(15)	Toaiti Ramsay
CE	3	Tevita Mikaela
CE	4(6)	Antony Naitoko
WG	5	Jeremiah Poutu
FE	6(20)	William Fakatoumafi
HB	7	Arthur Crichton
PR	8(10)	Jamel Hunt
HK	9(14)	Kruz Tupou
PR	10(21)	Albert Vete
SR	11	Mosese Faeamani
SR	12(22)	Viliami Tahitu'a
LF	13	Joseph Price
Reserve:3 Bostyn Hakaraia
Reserve:8 Stedman Lefau-Sala
Reserve:16 Terrell Lefau Sala
Reserve:17 Talitua Salima-Satuia
Reserve:27 Tony Tuia
Coach: Kevin Charlie & Phil Gordon
Manager: Val Luiaga
Trainers: Triston Waipouri & Logan Rout
Medical: David Nonoa

FB	1	Sefanaia Cowley-Lupo
WG	2	Sisi Toutai
CE	3(4)	Nixon Leaso
CE	4(3)	Paea Fotu
WG	5(23)	Kahn Munokoa
FE	6	Leti Muller
HB	7	Tama Darlington
PR	8(13)	Samuel Waterworth
HK	9(10)	Desmond Toofohe
PR	10(25)	George Tuihalangingie
SR	11	Tommy Beale
SR	12	Kaes Daniels Strickland
LF	13(8)	Shaun Tempest
Reserve:5 Jamie Henry
Reserve:14 Andre Kahui-Singh
Reserve:16 Clive Tuifua
Reserve:17 Victor Kenese
Reserve:22 Tumua Soo Choon
Coach: Sioeli Makaui
Manager: Te Mina Vila
Trainer: Devon Latoa
