= 2025 Auckland Rugby League season =

117th season of the Auckland Rugby League

Auckland Rugby League
- Founded: 1909
- Responsibility: Auckland
- Headquarters: Rugby League House, 17-19 Beasley Ave, Penrose, Auckland 1061
- Competitions: Fox Memorial Premiership, Sharman Cup, Steele-Shanks Women's Premiership
- Website: aucklandleague.co.nz
- As of 05 April 2025

The 2025 season is the 117th season since the founding of the Auckland Rugby League in 1909.

The men's senior season began with a 3-round qualifying competition for the Fox Memorial Shield where there were 3 pools of 4, with the top 2 teams from each qualifying for the Fox Memorial Premier competition. Richmond Rovers, Papakura Sea Eagles, Te Atatu Roosters, and Point Chevalier Pirates automatically qualified due to finishing in the top 4 in the previous season. The six teams who finished in the top two and won qualification to join them were Otahuhu Leopards, Mount Albert Lions, Manukau Magpies, Bay Roskill Vikings, Marist Saints, and for the first time in many years the Ponsonby Ponies. The teams who had been in the first division who were in the Sharman Cup for 2025 were Howick Hornets, Glenora Bears, and Otara Scorpions. The Steele-Shanks Women's Premiership reduced from seven teams to five with Richmond Roses dropping into the championship (2nd division), and Otara, Taniwharau, and Pakuranga failing to field senior women's teams at all. The competition was made up of teams from Mount Albert, Papakura, Otahuhu, Marist, and Mangere East.

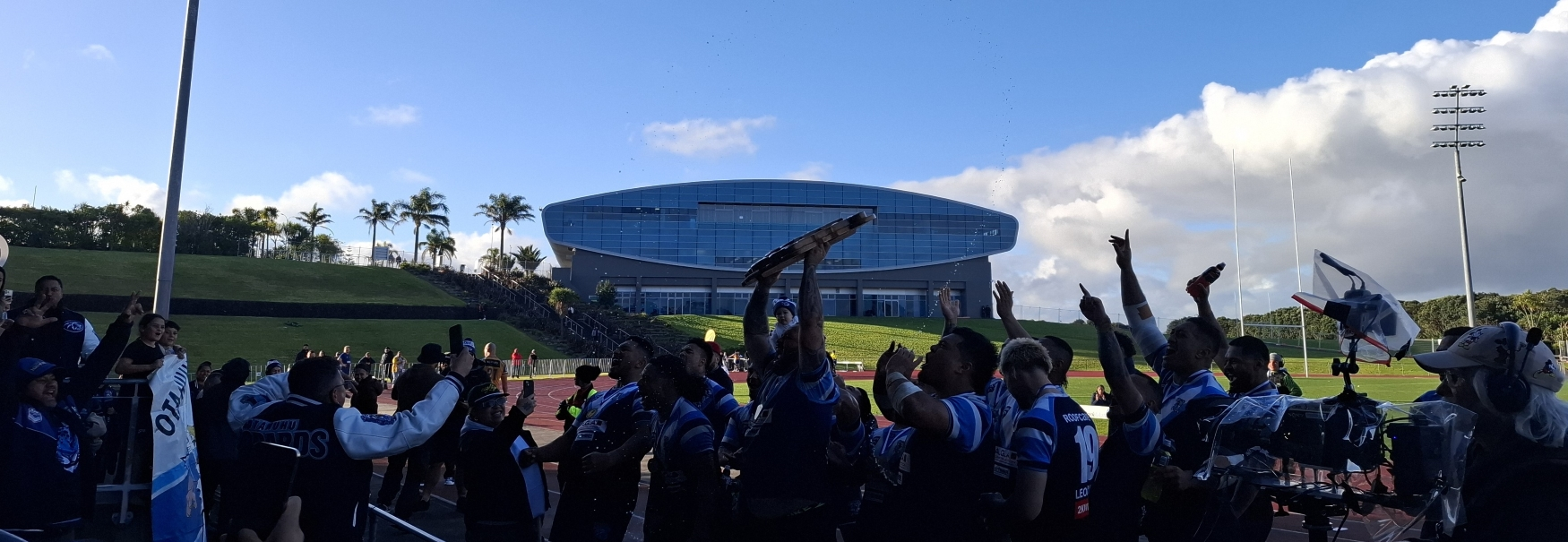
Otahuhu celebrating their Fox Memorial grand final win.

The Otahuhu Leopards completed a remarkable season when they won the Fox Memorial Shield for the 13th time following a hard fought 8-4 win over the Mt Albert Lions at Trusts Arena in Henderson on August 17. They went undefeated with 17 consecutive wins while their reserve grade side also went undefeated to win their championship. The Papakura Sea Eagles women's team went back to back when they beat the Mt Albert Lionesses 32-24.The Otara Scorpions caused an upset when they beat Hibiscus Coast Raiders 22-20 and ruined their undefeated run in the competition. It was the third time Otara had won the Sharman Cup. Joshua Tanielu was awarded the Fox Memorial Player of the Year award, being the first time in Bay Roskill's history that one of their players had won the award.

Preceded by 2024	117th Auckland Rugby League season 2025	Succeeded by 2026

== News ==
=== Premier competitions ===
The Fox Memorial Shield competition will begin after a 3-week Fox Qualifying competition. Due to covid disrupted seasons from 2020 to 2022 the Auckland Rugby League decided that “2023 and 2024 will work as a bridge between the 2022 shortened season and by 2025 will see a return to a more exclusive Fox Memorial Premiership competition”, with the 2025 season seeing only 10 teams in the Fox Memorial premiership, down from the 12 teams of 2023 and 2024.

=== Club teams and grade participation ===
Glenfield and East Coast Bays fielded a combined team in the Under 16 grade. The 55 teams in the Manurewa club was an increase of six from the previous season. Overall there was an increase of 20 teams from the 2024 season though the teams in the senior grades (men's and women's Premiers and Reserve grade sides, Senior B's and Open Age Restricted) decreased from 72 in 2024 to 66 in 2025.

Team	Prem	Res	OAR	SB	Mast	18	18G	17	16	16G	15	14	14G	13	13G	12	12G	11	10	9	8	7	6	Total
Manurewa Marlins	1	1	1	1	1	0	0	1	1	1	2	0	2	4	2	2	1	5	5	5	6	6	7	55
Mangere East Hawks	2	1	0	0	1	1	1	0	1	2	2	3	2	2	1	4	2	4	3	5	3	4	4	48
Otara Scorpions	1	1	0	1	2	0	0	2	1	0	1	1	1	2	1	3	0	2	4	4	3	4	3	37
Otahuhu Leopards	2	1	1	1	1	1	1	1	1	1	1	1	1	2	0	2	1	3	1	4	3	1	2	33
Papakura Sea Eagles	2	1	0	1	1	1	0	0	1	0	1	1	0	1	1	2	0	3	3	3	3	3	1	29
Mount Albert Lions	4	1	1	1	1	1	0	0	2	1	1	0	1	1	0	2	0	3	1	2	2	1	2	28
Richmond Rovers	2	1	0	1	1	1	1	0	0	2	2	0	2	1	0	1	2	1	2	1	2	2	3	28
Te Atatu Roosters	1	0	0	0	1	1	0	0	1	1	1	0	1	1	1	2	1	1	2	3	3	3	2	26
Glenora Bears	1	0	1	0	1	1	0	0	0	0	1	0	0	2	0	1	0	2	2	2	2	3	3	22
Ellerslie Eagles	0	0	0	0	1	0	0	1	1	0	1	1	1	1	0	2	0	1	2	2	2	1	1	18
Marist Saints	2	1	0	0	2	0	0	0	0	0	1	1	0	1	0	1	0	2	2	1	1	1	2	18
Waitemata Seagulls	2	1	0	0	1	0	0	0	0	0	0	0	0	1	0	2	1	0	3	2	1	1	1	16
Pakuranga Jaguars	1	1	0	0	1	0	1	0	0	0	1	0	0	0	0	1	0	1	2	1	2	2	1	15
Glenfield Greyhounds	1	0	0	1	1	0	0	0	0.5	0	1	0	0	0	1	1	0	1	2	1	1	1	2	14.5
Hibiscus Coast Raiders	1	1	0	0	1	0	0	0	0	0	0	0	0	0	0	1	0	1	1	2	2	2	2	14
Manukau Magpies	1	1	0	2	3	0	0	0	0	0	0	0	0	1	0	1	0	1	0	1	1	1	1	14
Point Chevalier Pirates	1	1	0	1	0	0	0	0	0	0	0	2	0	0	0	0	0	1	1	1	2	2	2	14
Northcote Tigers	1	1	0	0	1	0	0	0	0	0	0	0	0	1	0	1	0	1	1	2	1	1	2	13
Bay Roskill Vikings	1	1	0	1	1	0	0	0	1	0	1	0	0	1	0	1	0	1	0	1	0	0	2	12
New Lynn Stags	0	0	0	0	1	0	0	0	0	0	1	0	0	1	1	1	2	0	1	1	1	1	1	12
Papatoetoe Panthers	0	0	0	2	0	1	0	0	1	0	0	0	0	0	0	1	1	0	1	1	1	1	1	11
Howick Hornets	1	1	0	0	1	0	0	0	0	0	0	0	0	1	0	1	0	1	0	1	1	1	1	10
Pukekohe Pythons	1	0	0	0	0	0	0	0	0	0	0	0	1	0	0	1	0	0	0	1	0	1	1	6
East Coast Bays Barricudas	0	0	0	1	1	0	0	0	0.5	0	0	0	0	0	0	0	0	0	0	0	0	1	1	4.5
Ponsonby Ponies	1	0	0	0	0	0	0	0	0	0	0	0	0	0	0	0	0	0	0	0	1	0	1	3
Waiuku Toa	0	0	0	1	0	0	0	0	0	0	0	0	0	0	0	0	0	0	0	0	0	1	1	3
Tuakau Broncos	0	0	0	0	0	0	0	0	0	0	0	0	0	0	0	0	0	0	0	0	0	1	1	2
Mt Wellington Warriors	0	0	0	0	1	0	0	0	0	0	0	0	0	0	0	0	0	0	0	0	0	0	0	1
Rodney Rams	0	0	0	0	1	0	0	0	0	0	0	0	0	0	0	0	0	0	0	0	0	0	0	1
Te Awa O Waikato	0	0	0	0	1	0	0	0	0	0	0	0	0	0	0	0	0	0	0	0	0	0	0	1
Te Iti Reearea	0	0	0	0	0	1	0	0	0	0	0	0	0	0	0	0	0	0	0	0	0	0	0	1
Waiheke Rams	0	0	1	0	0	0	0	0	0	0	0	0	0	0	0	0	0	0	0	0	0	0	0	1
Total	30	16	5	15	28	9	4	5	12	8	18	10	12	24	8	34	11	35	39	47	44	46	51	511

== Fox Memorial Competition ==
The men's premiership competition started on April 5 with a 3-round grading competition. There were 12 teams competing divided into 3 pools based on their seeding from their finishing positions at the end of the 2024 season.

=== Fox Memorial Qualifying ===
The 3 pools for qualifying were as follows with seedings in brackets based on the 2024 finishing positions:

Pool A	Pool B	Pool C
(5) Otahuhu	(6) Mt Albert	(7) Manukau
(10) Marist	(9) Bay Roskill	(8) Howick
(11) Glenora	(12) Otara	(13) Northcote
(18) Manurewa	(15) Hibiscus Coast	(14) Ponsonby

==== Pool A Standings ====
Team	Pld	W	D	L	F	A	%	Pts
Otahuhu Leopards	3	3	0	0	272	10	262	6
Marist Saints	3	2	0	1	132	92	40	4
Manurewa Marlins	3	1	0	2	50	174	-124	2
Glenora Bears	3	0	0	3	38	216	-178	0

===== Round 1 =====
Otahuhu in all likelihood handed Glenora their heaviest senior team defeat in their 94-year history with a 110–0 victory. Thirteen separate players scored tries for Otahuhu with William Fakatoumafi kicking 16 goals to go with a try for 36 individual points. New signing Sebastine Ikahihifo, a former New Zealand Warrior and Huddersfield Giants player scored a double. Marist easily beat Manurewa 56–10 with William, Cyruss, and Elam Payne scoring the opening tries for the winners.

5 April	Otahuhu	110-0	Glenora	Bert Henham Park 1
2:30	Try: Tevita Mikaele 3 (19m, 39m, 56m), Sebastine Ikahihifo 2 (21m, 66m), Sione Feao (22m), William Fakatoumafi (22m), Viliami Kuli (23m), Kelepi Manuika 2 (23m, 75m), Sione Tesese 2 (28m, 47m), Maddison Tekeu (32m), Bostyn Hakaraia 2 (40m, 41m), Connor Taurua-Purcell (42m), Ben Wharton-Benedict (51m), Phoenix Hunt (61m), Andrew Nansen (70m); Con: William Fakatoumafi 15 (20m, 21m, 23m, 24m, 29m, 33m, 39m, 40m, 43m, 49m, 53m, 58m, 62m, 68m, 75m), Viliami Kuli (71m); Pen: William Fakatoumafi (18m)			Referee: [Match Managers: Dianna Fisiifetau and Michelle Munday]

5 April	Marist	56-10	Manurewa	Murray Halberg Park 1
2:30	Try: William Ian John Payne 2 (3m, 74m), Cyruss Payne (12m), Elam Payne (16m), Montell Matamu Tuese (35m), Lani Graham-Taufa (40m), Johnathan Aumua Falelua-Malio (41m), James Tulisi (43m), Cree Braithwaite (48m), Isileli Ula 2 (52m, 76m); Con: Isileli Ula 6/11 (17m, 36m, 40m, 42m, 45m, 49m)		Try: Elijah Solomona (25m), Corey Hebden (68m); Pen: Nathan Simmons (80m)	Referee: [Match Managers: David Telea and Paula Betham

===== Round 2 =====
The Manurewa v Otahuhu match was originally scheduled for Mountfort Park 1: Jack Shelly field but due to the wet weather it was closed and the match was transferred to Otahuhu's home ground of Bert Henham Park.

12 April	Otahuhu	92-0	Manurewa	Bert Henham Park 1
2:30	Try: Mosese Faeamani (2m), Viliami Kuli 3 (10m, 16m, 53m), Sebastine Ikahihifo (13m), Andrew Nansen 2 (19m, 31m), Unknown (22m), Sione Feao 2 (35m, 44m), Toaiti Ramsay 2 (49m, 62m), Phoenix Hunt 2 (67m, 79m), Atanasio Kuea (74m), Unknown (75m), Tevita Mikaele (76m); Con: Dylan Tavita 5 (2m, 10m, 14m, 20m, 23m), Viliami Kuli 3 (36m, 46m, 75m), Tevita Mikaele 4 (67m, 74m, 77m, 80m)			Referee: [Match Manager: Rachel Thompson, Barbie Wilson]

12 April	Marist	66-12	Glenora	Murray Halberg Park 1
2:30	Try: Lani Graham-Taufa 3 (19m, 29m, 67m), Cree Braithwaite (36m), Johnathan Aumua Falelua-Malio (41m), Cyruss Payne (45m), Elijah Sami (51m), Doux Kauhiva (59m), William Ian John Payne 3 (65m, 72m, 73m), Wallace Teaurimu (77m); Con: Isileli Ula 6 (20m, 38m, 46m, 52m, 66m, 69m), Jahvaan Manukau Powell (60m), Lani Graham-Taufa (73m), Montell Matamu Tuese (75m)		Try: Zion Watling (33m), Luke Cunis (56m); Con: Zion Watling (34m), Noah Connolly (57m)	Referee: [Match Manager: Paula Betham]

===== Round 3 =====
26 April	Glenora	26-40	Manurewa	Harold Moody 1
2:30	Try: Noah Connolly (25m), Bronson Bernard (37m), Werner Faaumuumu (44m), Hermann Santos (67m), Mark Cowan (80m); Con: Faapale Lafililo 2 (38m, 68m), Noah Connolly (80m)		Try: Elijah Solomona 3 (6m, 34m, 60m), Amerika Uili (13m), Daniel du Plessis (30m), Bronson Chan (51m), Nathan Simmons (73m), Jayson Iosefa (76m); Con: Hauriri Harvey 3 (7m, 14m, 75m), Nathan Simmons (77m)	Referee: [Match Managers: Antonia Petri and Janet Hunt]

26 April	Otahuhu	70-10	Marist	Bert Henham Park 1
2:30	Try: Viliami Kuli (1m), Jamel Hunt (23m), Maddison Tekeu 3 (33m, 56m, 80m), Dylan Tavita 2 (34m, 45m), Ben Wharton-Benedict (38m), Toaiti Ramsay (42m), Tevita Mikaele 2 (50m, 75m), Phoenix Hunt (74m), Unknown (76m); Con: Dylan Tavita 2 (4m, 24m), Unknown (34m), Bostyn Hakaraia 6 (39m, 43m, 47m, 51m, 73m, 80m)		Try: William Poching (10m), Laurence McFall (19m); Con: Doux Kauhiva (12m)	Referee: [Match Managers: Dianna Fisiifetau and Michelle Munday]

==== Pool B Standings ====
Team	Pld	W	D	L	F	A	%	Pts
Mount Albert Lions	3	3	0	0	122	28	94	6
Bay Roskill Vikings	3	2	0	1	80	84	-4	4
Otara Scorpions	3	0	1	2	58	90	-32	1
Hibiscus Coast Raiders	3	0	1	2	46	104	-58	1

===== Round 1 =====
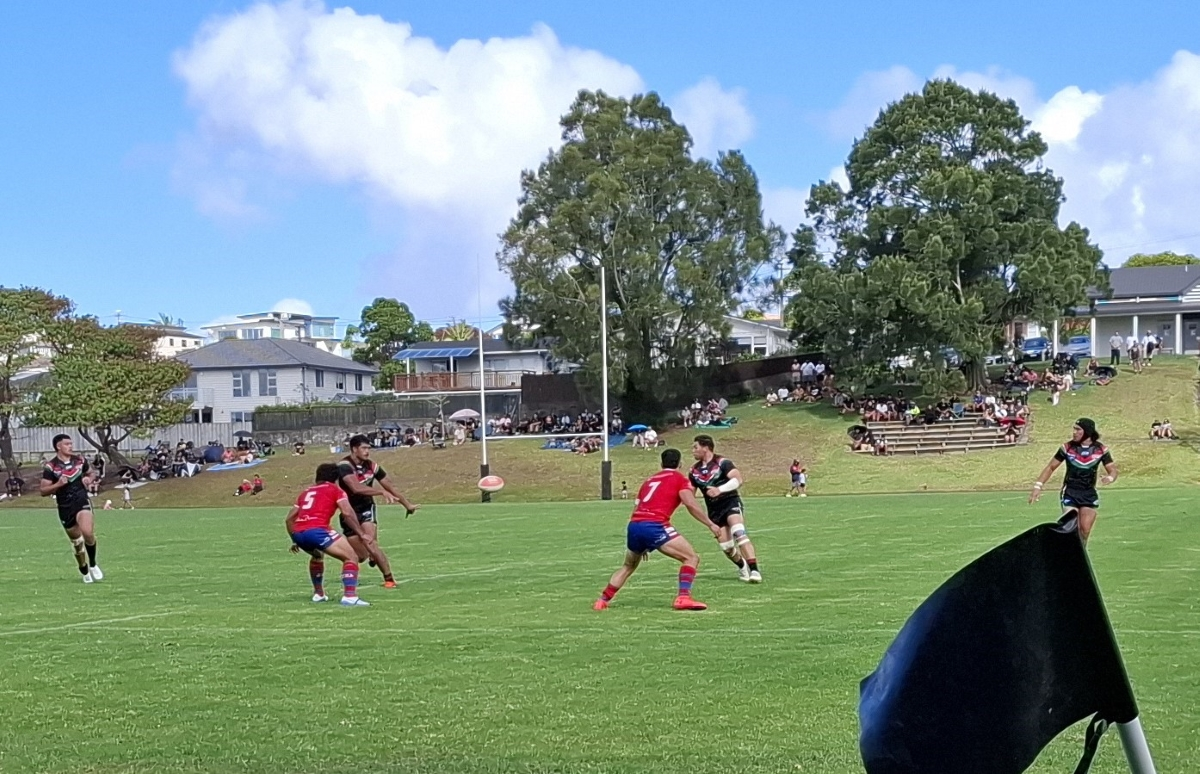
Zion Tanielu shifting the ball during the first half of Bay Roskill's comeback win over Otara.

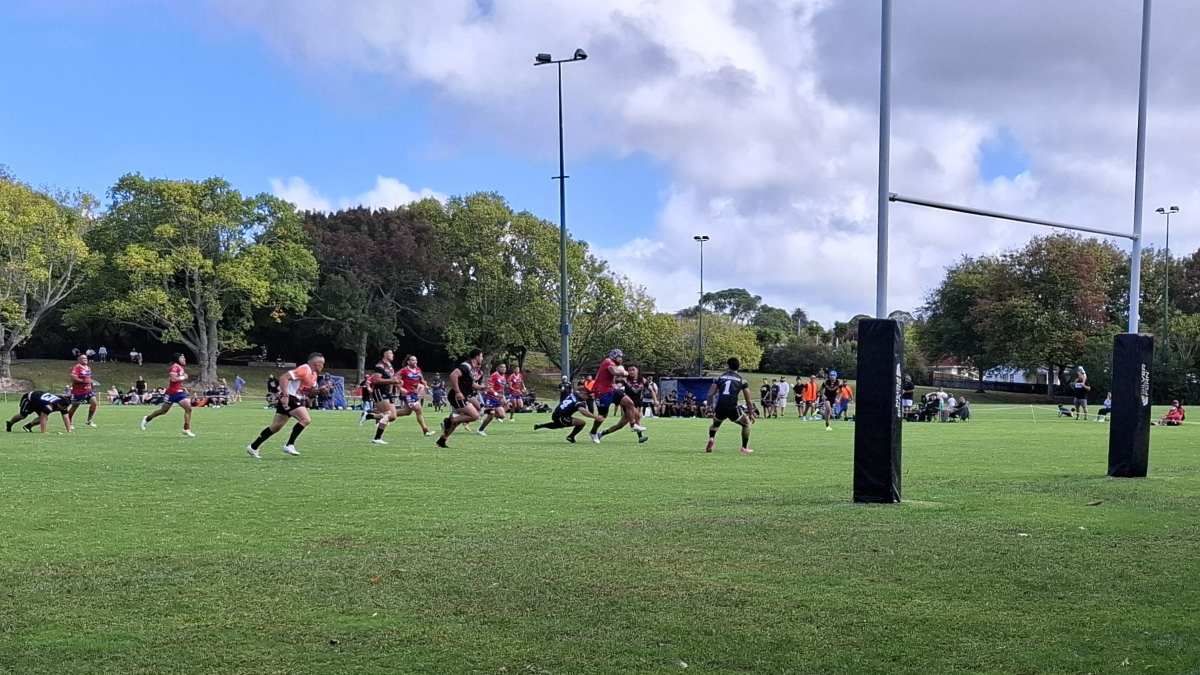
Otara attacking in the first half.

Mount Albert recorded a comfortable 42–6 over Hibiscus Coast at Stanmore Bay in a match filmed by Petes Filming. Api Pewhairangi made his debut for the Lions. He had previously played for Parramatta Eels (2013), London Broncos (2016–18), and Te Atatu Roosters (2021–23) as well as representing Ireland. He had also played rugby union for Connacht and Ngati Porou East Coast. The game at Blockhouse Bay reserve saw Bay Roskill score first before Otara ran in four unconverted tries to lead 16–6 at half time. The second half saw the Vikings come back to score five tries to one and record a 14-point win.

5 April	Hibiscus Coast	6-42	Mount Albert	Stanmore Bay 1
2:30	Try: Samuel Waterworth (38m); Con: Notana Snowden (39m)		Try: Isaiah Fale 2 (3m, 10m), Api Pewhairangi 2 (6m, 74m), Marcus Fraser 2 (25m, 79m), David Jardine-Ngauamo (20m), Kalepo Paualaisa (76m); Con: Dion Fraser 4/6 (7m, 11m, 22m, 74), Solomon Vasuvulagi 0/1, Kahil Johnson 1/1 (80m)	Attendance: 200; Referee: [Match managers: Kevin Smith and Cameron Anderson]

5 April	Bay Roskill	34-20	Otara	Blockhouse Bay Reserve 4
2:30	Try: Zion Tanielu 2 (17m, 43m), Carlos Davis 2 (41m, 69m), Jarvis Leaoseve (48m), Joshua Tanielu (76m); Con: Joshua Tanielu (19m, 41m, 45m, 50m, 70m)		Try: Saul Tauhinu (20m), Filipo Utai 2 (28m, 70m), Manaia Lauaki (32m), Germon Paulo (39m)	Referee: Paki Parkinson, [Match Managers: Paul Millar and Lael Millar]

===== Round 2 =====
12 April	Otara	22-22	Hibiscus Coast	Ngati Otara Park 1
2:30	Try: Filipo Utai 2 (7m, 36m), Jody Henry (34m), Tito Palei (40m); Con: Jody Henry 2 (9m, 38m), Kuros Metuariki (35m)		Try: Nehumi Teu 2 (53m, 70m), Kavana Te Kiri-Ryan (57m), George Prescott (62m); Con: Korey Craig 3 (58m, 63m, 71m)	Referee: [Match Manager: Neil Petaia and Ruta Petero]

12 April	Mt Albert	46-6	Bay Roskill	Fowlds Park 1
2:30	Try: Kahil Johnson (7m), Ethan Jardine-Ngauamo (27m), Solomon Vasuvulagi (34m), Kalepo Paualaisa (37m), Lyrakai-Layke Posimani (57m), John Aitu (61m), Bonowai Baledrokadroka (75m), Navajo Doyle (80m); Con: Dion Fraser 6 (8m, 34m, 38m, 58m, 75m, 80m), Kahil Johnson (28m)		Try: Joshua Tanielu (78m); Con: Joshua Tanielu (79m)	Referee: [Match Manager: Joseph Mouton]

===== Round 3 =====
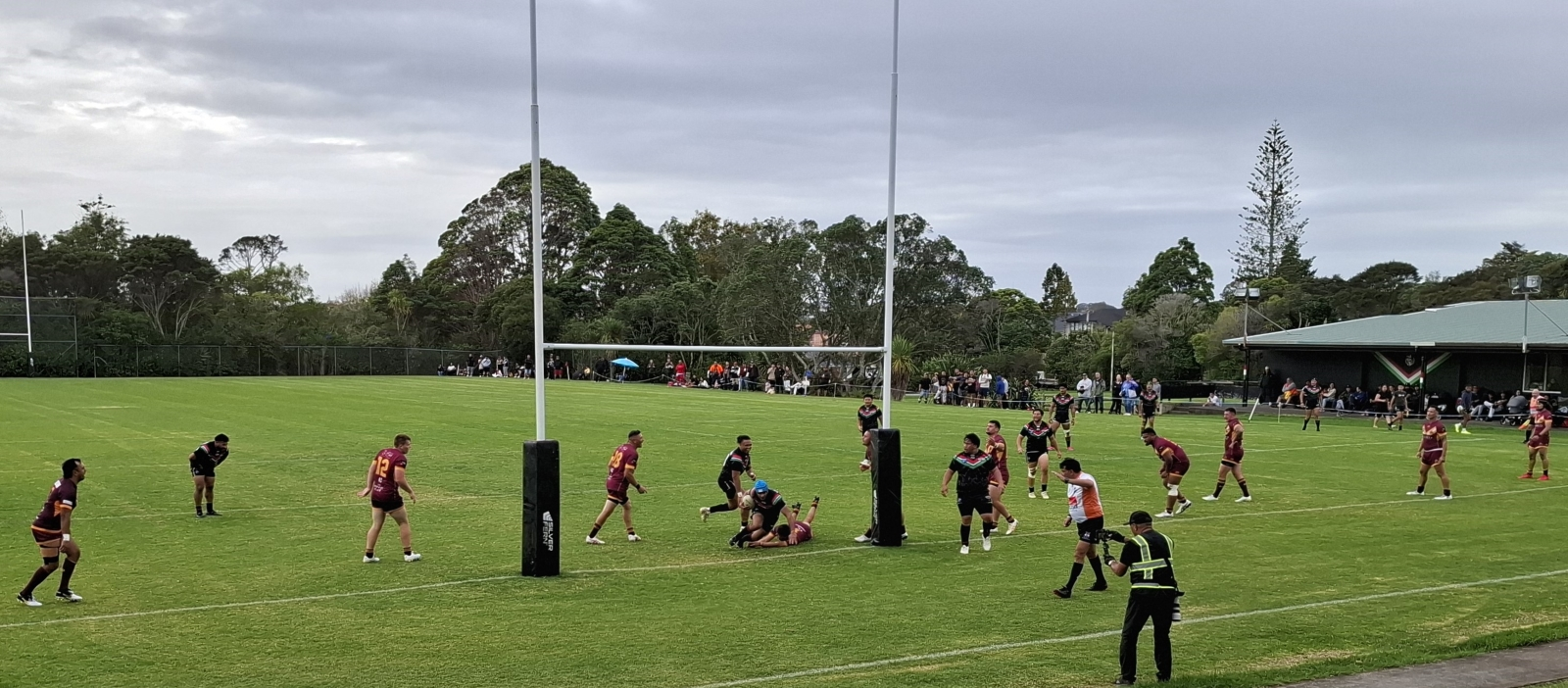
Cheoneth Henry scoring Bay Roskill's opening try.

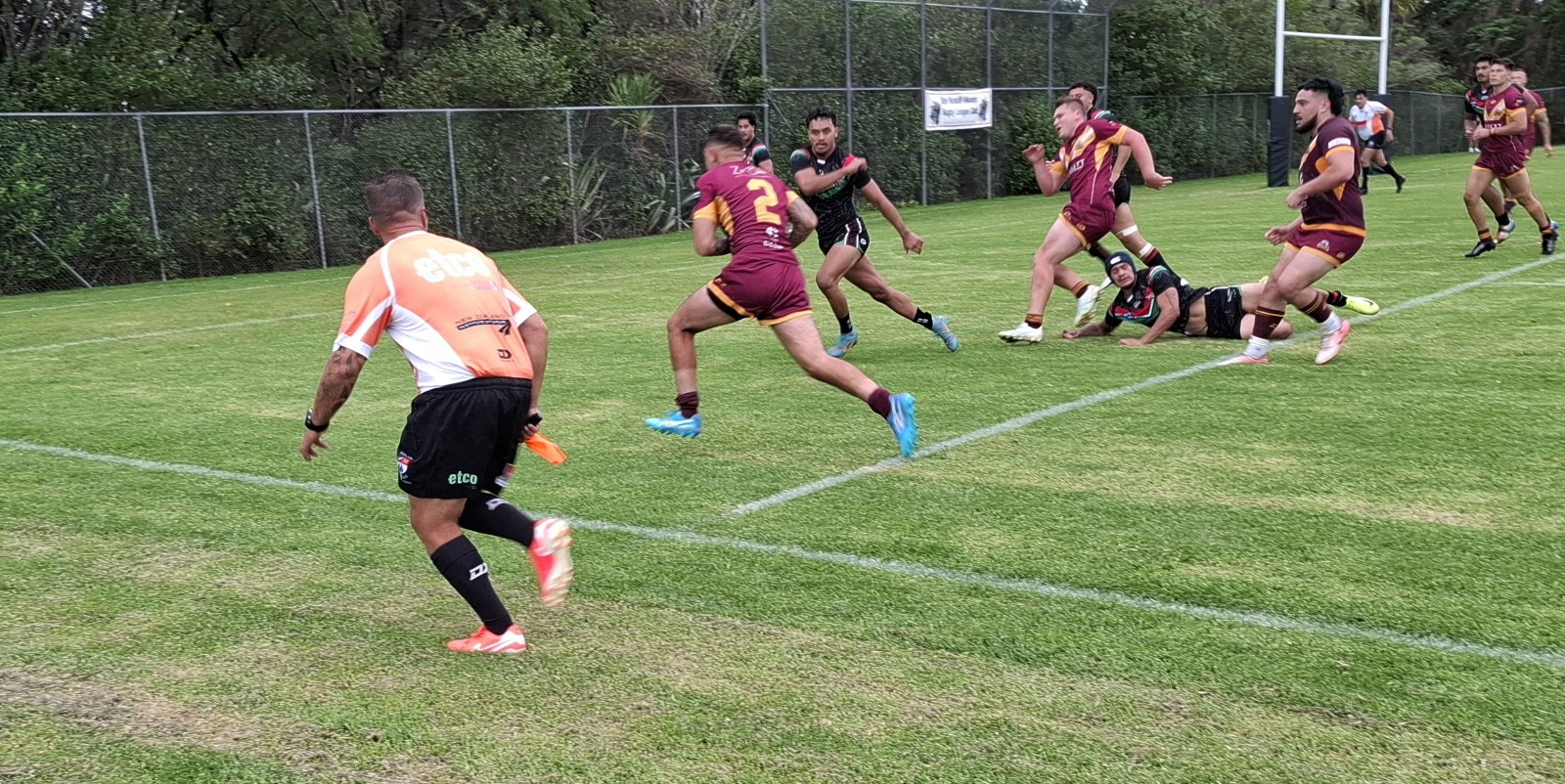
Taine Tekiri Ryan scoring in the corner for Hibiscus Coast.

Isaiah Fale scored a double for Mt Albert in their 34–16 win over Otara which secured their place in the Fox Memorial competition for 2025. Dion Fraser converted five of their six tries. Otara had led 6-4 until the 26th minute after an early converted try to Tovia Christopher Tovia. Former Bay Roskill junior, and Glenora and Richmond senior player Solomon Vasuvulagi scored one of Mount Albert's tries. At Blockhouse Bay Reserve the winner would make the Fox Memorial competition. Hibiscus Coast led 18–10 after 48 minutes following a scything run from Korey Craig for a try, however Bay Roskill rallied and scored five converted tries to win comfortably in the end. Former New Zealand Warrior, Ben Henry scoring in the 59th minute. Former professional player and NRL referee Henry Perenara scored Hibiscus Coast's opening try.

26 April	Mount Albert	34-16	Otara	Fowlds Park 1
2:30	Try: Paaua Papuni-Abbott (12m), Isaiah Fale 2 (26m, 75m), Solomon Vasuvulagi (39m), Dion Fraser (52m), Kalepo Paualaisa (60m); Con: Dion Fraser 5 (27m, 40m, 52m, 61m, 76m)		Try: Tovia Christopher Tovia (5m), Akuila Tuha (48m), Filipo Utai (70m); Con: Titanian Palei 2 (6m, 50m)	Referee: [Match Manager: Joseph Mouton]

26 April	Bay Roskill	40-18	Hibiscus Coast	Blockhouse Bay Reserve 4
2:30	Try: Cheoneth Henry (14m), Ariki Honetana-Paea (30m), Ben Henry (59m), Xavier Tutaki (63m), Ezra Vogel (69m), Justus Leaoseve (74m), Renouf Oge (77m); Con: Joshua Tanielu 5 (15m, 60m, 65m, 71m, 75m), Carlos Davis (78m)		Try: Henry Perenara (23m), Taine Tekiri Ryan (32m), Korey Craig (46m); Con: Korey Craig 2 (24m, 48m); Pen: Korey Craig (39m)	Attendance: 200; Referee: [Match Managers: Paul Millar and Lael Millar]

==== Pool C Standings ====
Team	Pld	W	D	L	F	A	%	Pts
Manukau Magpies	3	3	0	0	94	40	54	6
Ponsonby Ponies	3	2	0	1	70	60	10	4
Howick Hornets	3	1	0	2	64	92	-28	2
Northcote Tigers	3	0	0	3	56	92	-36	0

===== Round 1 =====
5 April	Manukau	32-8	Ponsonby	Moyle Park 1
2:30	Try: Bailey Vaeau (13m), Aisake Tauatina (23m), Samuel Nati (35m), Taunga Arama 2 (41m, 78m), Kahn Munokoa (57m); Con: Fred Muller 4 (37m, 44m, 59m, 79m)		Try: Tevita Faukafa (19m), Jesse Siolo (45m)	Referee: [Match Managers: Charish Luehetoa and Heath Walker]

5 April	Howick	32-28	Northcote	Paparoa Park 1
2:30	Try: Joel Iloahefaiva (16m), Mason Te Rore (2m), Unknown (41m), Peter Heretama-Wikaire 2 (53m, 59m), Anthony Gelling (63m); Con: Mason Te Rore (4m), Paula Fukofuka 3 (54m, 60m, 64m)		Try: Arno Mouton 2 (8m, 69m), Ethan Schaumkel (21m), Taine Neho (49m), Huston Holloway (80m); Con: James Bates 4 (9m, 22m, 51m, 80m)	Referee: [Match Manager: Gregory Williams]

===== Round 2 =====
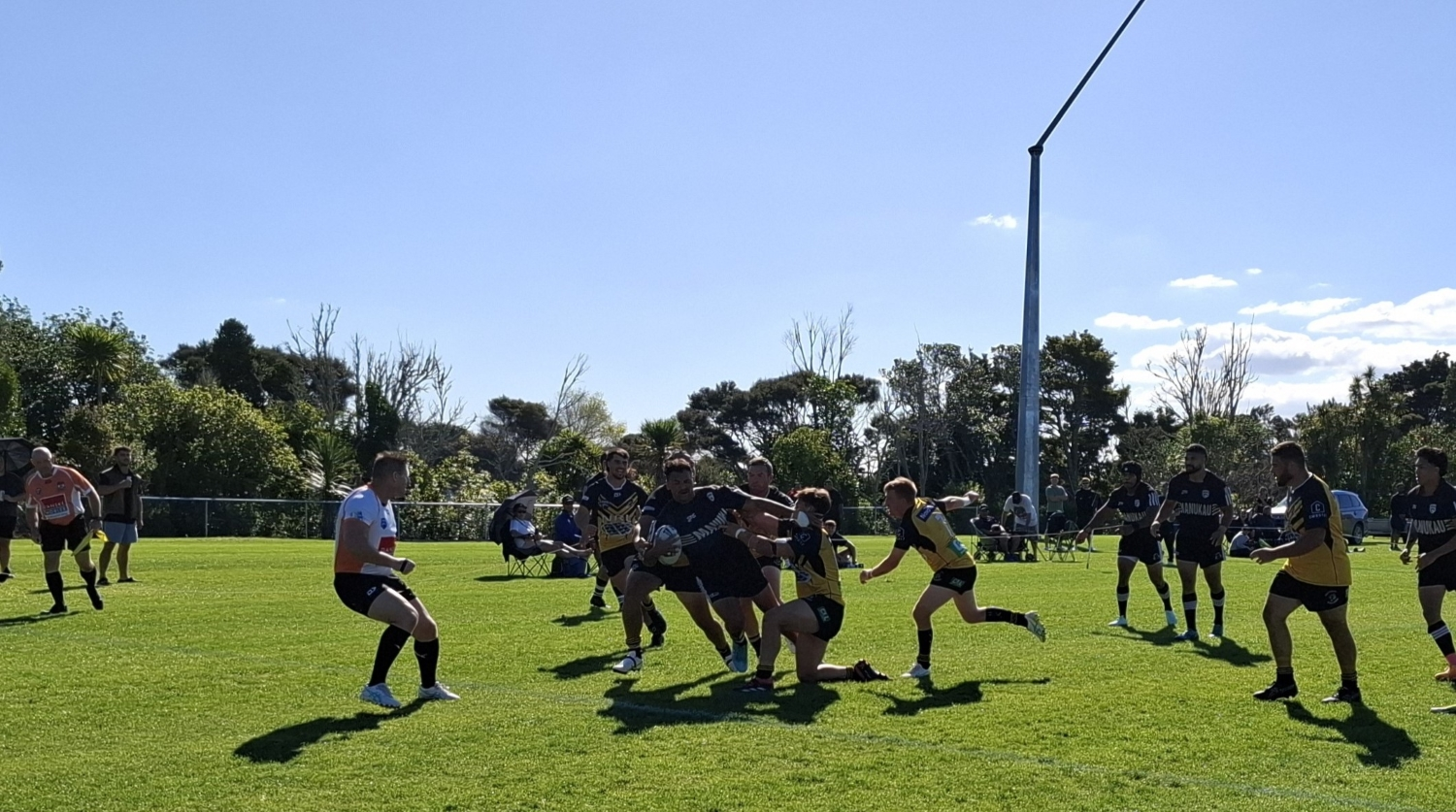
Kahn Munokoa scoring after cutting back through the Northcote defence.

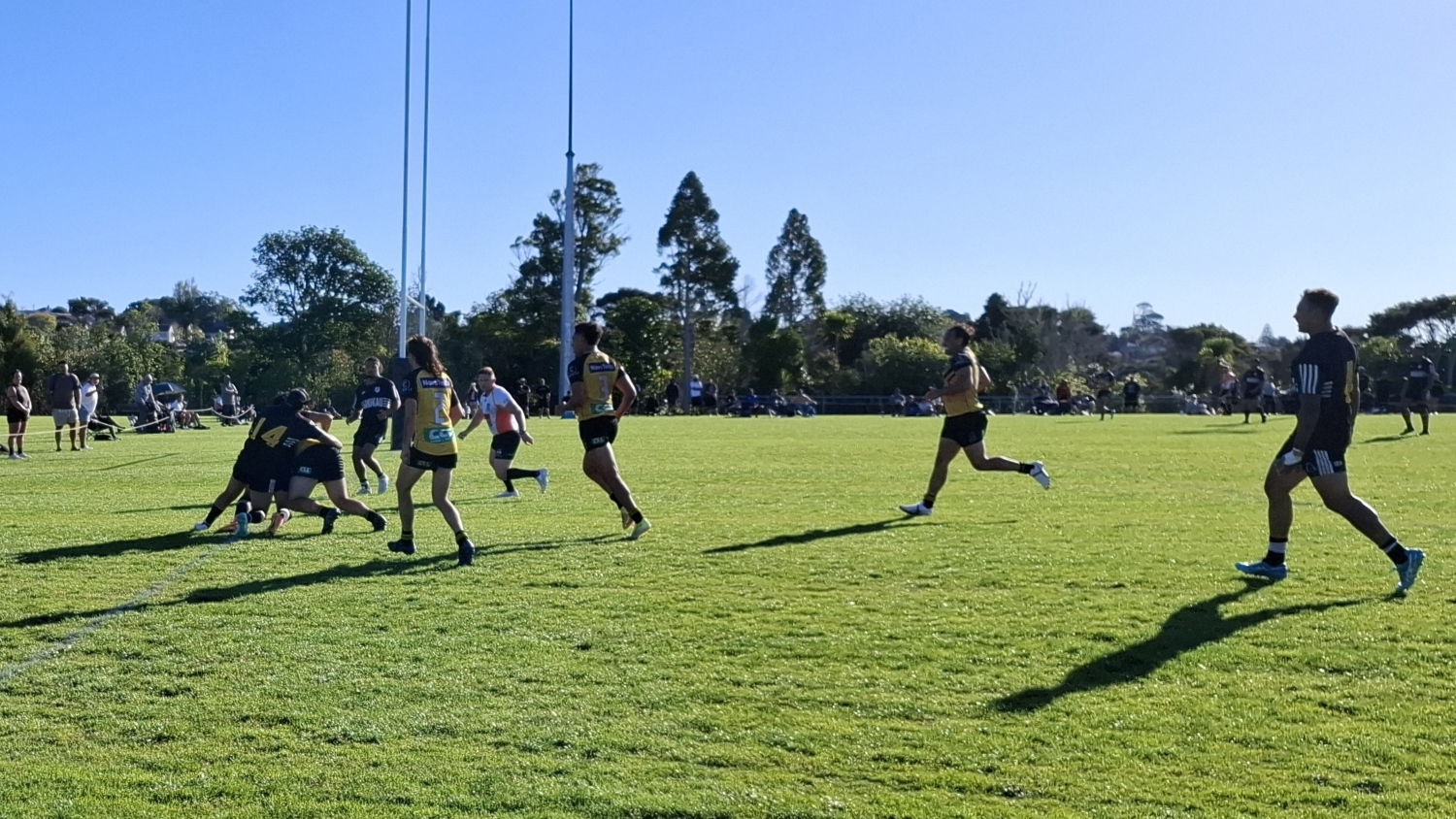
AJ Joubert scoring for Northcote late in the second half.

Manukau scored four first half tries to take an 18–0 lead at halftime. Northcote got the score to 22–12 after three unconverted tries but Manukau held them off to all but secure their place in the 2025 Fox Memorial competition. At Paparoa Park Ponsonby caused an upset 30–16 win over Howick. Amaramo Solomona scored a double for the winners with Charles Gabriel converting three of their six tries.

12 April	Northcote	16-28	Manukau	Birkenhead War Memorial 4
2:30	Try: Jason Bhana (41m), Siliga Autagavaia (47m), Jonathan Little (60m), AJ Joubert (77m)		Try: Aisake Tauatina (3m), Koronato John (13m), Kahn Munokoa (17m), Sione Toutai 2 (35m, 54m), Bailey Vaeau (71m); Con: Fred Muller 2 (5m, 56m)	Referee: [Match Managers: Tarl Cook and Niki Wallace]

12 April	Howick	16-30	Ponsonby	Paparoa Park 1
2:30	Try: Sean Churchward-Isaaka (8m), Trent Bishop (33m), Xander Mahu-Delamere (59m); Con: Rongonui Andrews 2 (34m, 61m)		Try: Lelefu Sang Yum (15m), Timor Williams (40m), Tony Siligi (43m), Amaramo Solomona 2 (49m, 80m), Rylie Williams (70m); Con: Charles Gabriel 3 (17m, 44m, 50m)	Referee: [Match Manager: Gregory Williams]

===== Round 3 =====
26 April	Manukau	34-16	Howick	Moyle Park
2:30	Try: Monnier Togiafofoa (9m), Taunga Arama 3 (29m, 55m, 79m), Sisi Toutai (40m), Paea Folau (43m); Con: Fred Muller 5 (11m, 32m, 45m, 57m, 80m)		Try: Paula Fukofuka (17m), Zephaniah Lototau (51m), Xander Mahu-Delamere (76m); Con: Mason Te Rore (19m, 77m)	Referee: [Match Manager: Charish Luehetoa and Heather Walker]

26 April	Ponsonby	32-12	Northcote	Victoria Park 1
2:30	Try: Felise Tau 2 (16m, 21m), Tevita Faukafa (36m), Timor Williams (52m), Heitony Talagi (67m), Mitchuel Elima (71m); Con: Charles Gabriel 4/6 (17m, 22m, 54m, 68m)		Try: Unknown (4m), Taylor Daniels (32m), Jason Bhana (76m)	Referee: [Match Manager: Lilite Kawaguchi]

==== Grading round top point scorers ====
Grading round top point scorers (3 games)
No	Player	Team	T	C	P	DG	Pts
1	William Fakatoumafi	Otahuhu	1	15	1	0	36
2	Dion Fraser	Mt Albert	1	15	0	0	34
3=	Tevita Mikaele	Otahuhu	6	4	0	0	32
3=	Isileli Ula	Marist	2	12	0	0	32
5	Joshua Tanielu	Bay Roskill	2	11	0	0	30

=== Fox Memorial ===
==== Standings ====
Team	Pld	W	D	L	F	A	PD	Pts
Otahuhu Leopards	12	12	0	0	522	88	+434	24
Mount Albert Lions	12	9	0	3	320	171	+149	18
Manukau Magpies	12	8	1	3	289	202	+87	17
Papakura Sea Eagles	12	8	0	4	318	277	+41	16
Richmond Rovers	12	6	0	6	312	312	0	12
Bay Roskill Vikings	12	6	0	6	288	316	-28	12
Point Chevalier Pirates	12	5	1	6	354	302	+52	11
Marist Saints	12	3	0	9	214	374	-160	6
Te Atatu Roosters	12	1	0	11	207	454	-247	2
Ponsonby Ponies	12	1	0	11	182	510	-328	2

==== Fixtures ====
===== Round 1 =====
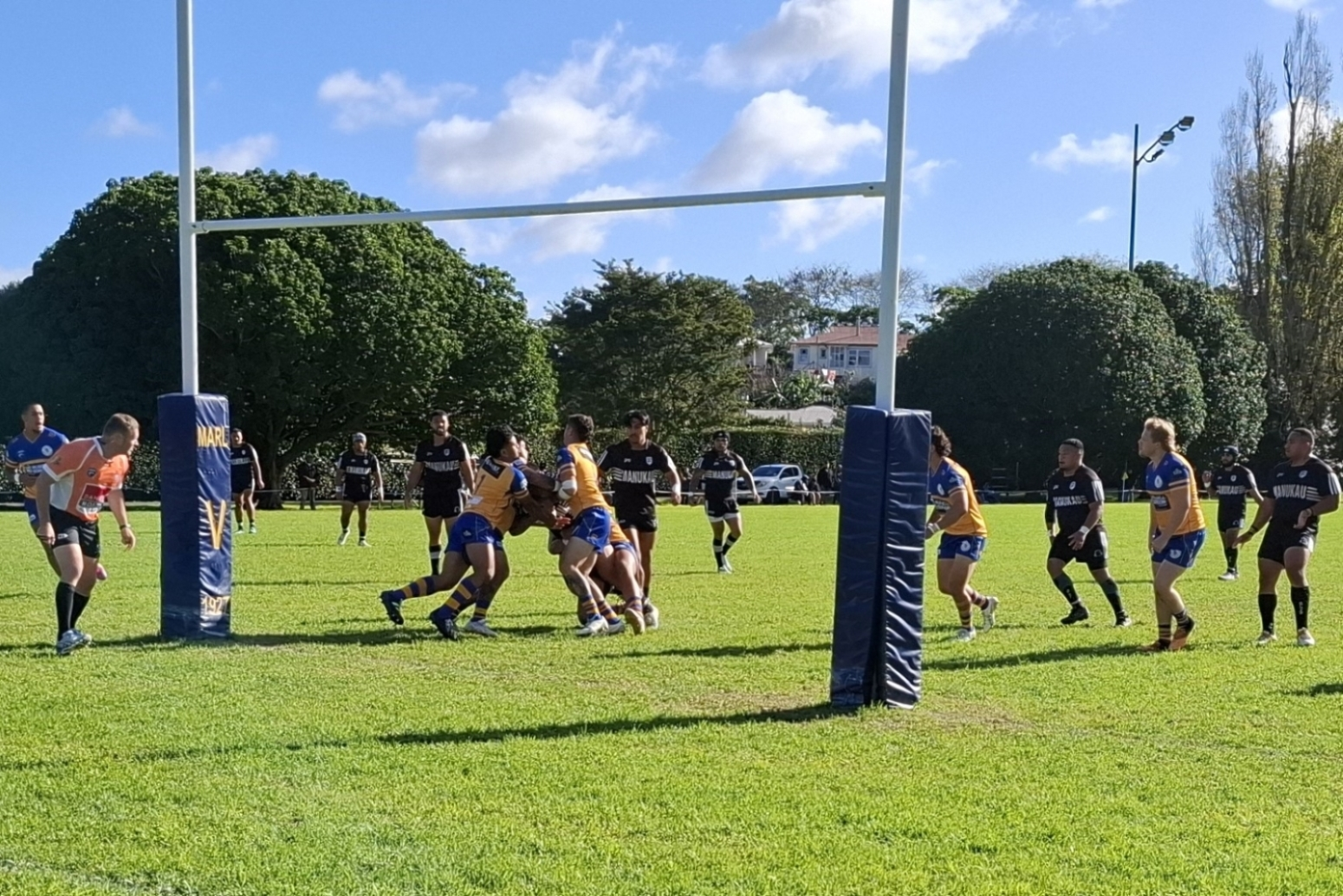
Mount Albert defending their line against Manukau during the first half.

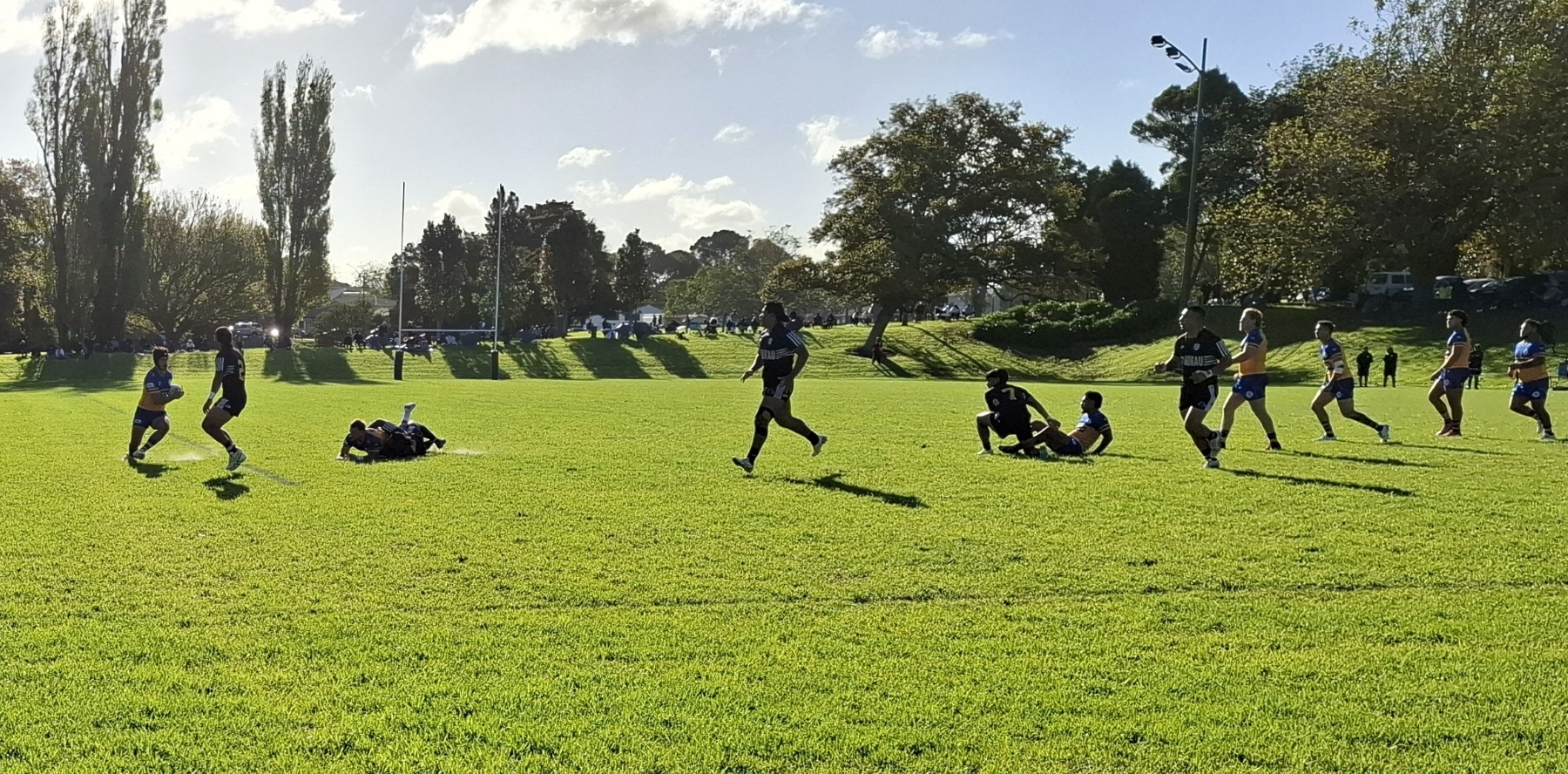
Mount Albert winger, Isaiah Fale with the ball during the second half with Sisi Toutai defending.

Papakura claimed the Stormont Shield for 2025 when they beat Richmond at Grey Lynn Park 30–26. The Stormont Shield match in recent years has been played in the opening round between the two Fox Memorial finalists from the previous season. Arthur Crichton scored a double while James Dowie kicked five goals to go with a try for the Sea Eagles. Siave Togoiu also scored against his former side. Marist caused something of an upset with a 30–26 win over Point Chevalier. Both teams scored five tries but the kicking of Doux Kauhiva was the difference with a 100% conversion rate. Second rower, Johnathan Falelua-Malio scored a double for Marist. At Jack Colvin Park, Ponsonby recorded a win in their first game in the first division for over 30 years. The match was for the Roope Rooster trophy with Ponsonby winning the trophy for the first time since 1973. Both teams also scored five tries each but Te Atatu was only able to convert one, while Charles Gabriel kicked four for the Ponies. At Fowlds Park the visiting Manukau side missed the services of injured Samuel Nati and were unable to score any tries in a 22–2 loss to a Mount Albert side which defended strongly. Dion Fraser scored a try and kicked three goals for the winners.

3 May	Richmond	26-30	Papakura	Grey Lynn Park 2
2:30	Try: Ropati Tupa'i (31m), Daniel Sausau (35m), Waikare Ratima (54m), Sione Ngahe (77m), Beau Cordtz (80m); Con: Beau Cordtz 3/5 (54m, 78m, 80m)		Try: Arthur Crichton 2 (5m, 46m), Stedman Lefau (13m), Siave Togoiu (26m), James Dowie (42m); Con: James Dowie 3/5 (5m, 14m, 27m); Pen: James Dowie 2/2 (44m, 71m)	Referee: [Match Manager: Amy Ah Kuoi-Bernard]

3 May	Te Atatu	22-28	Ponsonby	Jack Colvin Park
2:30	Try: Logan Tuimauga (19m), Rhys Wikitera (43m), Sunia Hala (59m), Charvez Watts Ikutule (69m), Luke Mayo (80m); Con: Francis Leger (60m)		Try: Felise Tau (26m), Heitony Talagi (29m), Timor Williams (39m), Tevita Faukafa (50m), Amaramo Solomona (62m); Con: Charles Gabriel 4/5 (27m, 31m, 40m, 64m)	Referee: [Match Manager: David Simpson]

3 May	Point Chevalier	26-30	Marist	Walker Park 2
2:30	Try: Tyrone Hurt-Pickering (18m), Unknown (22m), Unknown (42m), Unknown (45m), Malakai Cama (50m); Con: Unknown (19m, 23m), Caleb Laiman (43m)		Try: Johnathan Aumua Falelua-Malio 2 (9m, 59m), Elijah Lexus Tupii Sami (32m), Wallace Teaurima (53m), Doux Kauhiva (74m); Con: Doux Kauhiva 5/5 (10m, 34m, 55m, 60m, 76m)	Referee: [Match Manager: Alofa Murray]

3 May	Otahuhu	36-6	Bay Roskill	Bert Henham Park 1
2:30	Try: Tevita Mikaele (6m), Andrew Nansen 2 (11m, 42m), Sebastine Ikahihifo (48m), Maddison Tekeu (50m), Toaiti Ramsay 2 (55m, 74m); Con: Bostyn Hakaraia 4 (43m, 49m, 57m, 75m)		Try: Unknown (68m); Pen: Unknown (40m)	Referee: [Match Manager: Dianna Fisiifetau]

3 May	Mount Albert	22-2	Manukau	Fowlds Park 1
2:30	Try: Dion Fraser (18m), Marcus Fraser (28m), Kahil Johnson (57m), Thompson Karena (76m); Con: Dion Fraser 3/4 (20m, 30m, 58m)		Pen: Fred Muller (4m)	Referee: Anthony Elliot, [Match Manager: Joseph Mouton]

===== Round 2 =====
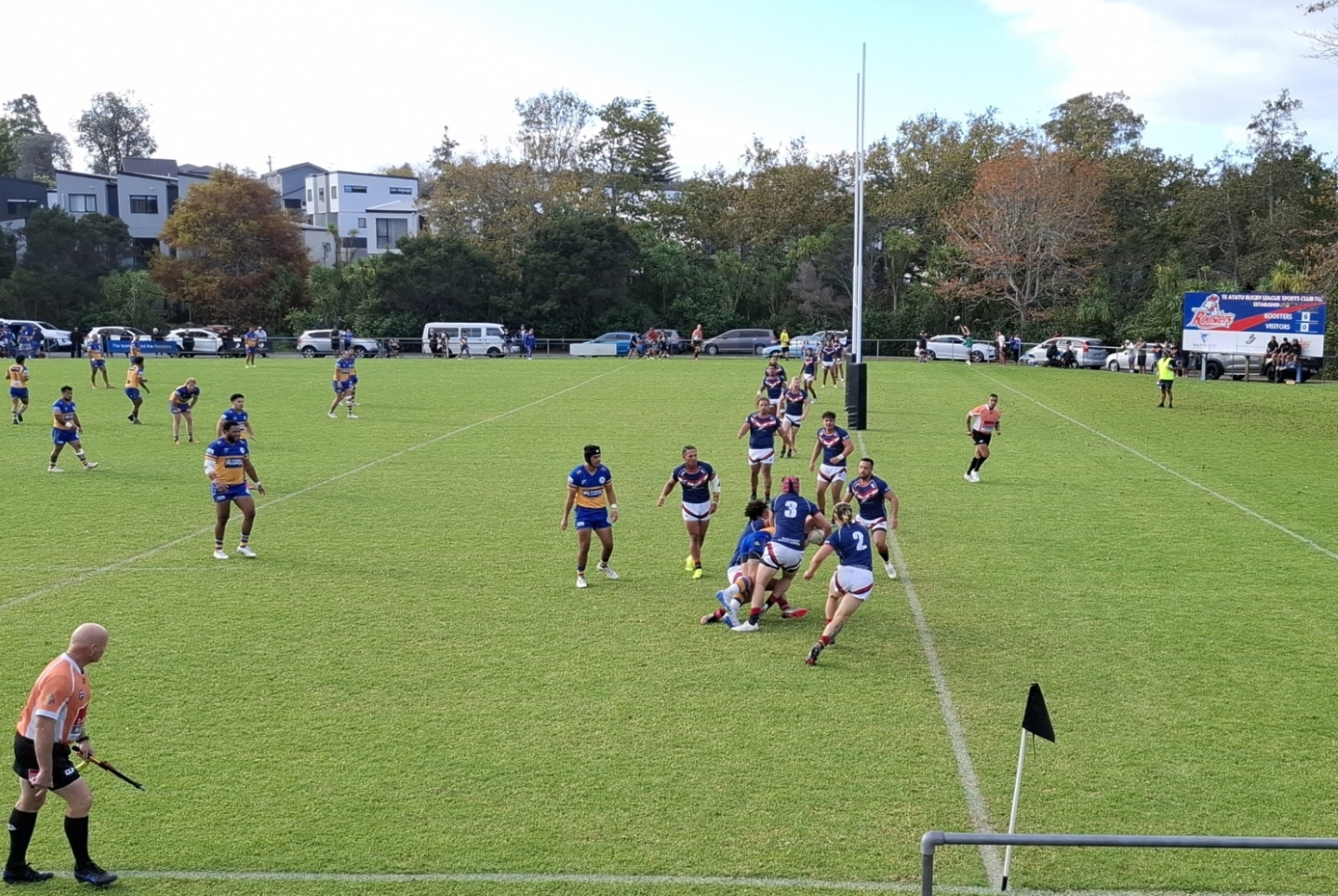
Chaz Brown (Mt Albert) tackled on the Te Atatu try line during the first half.

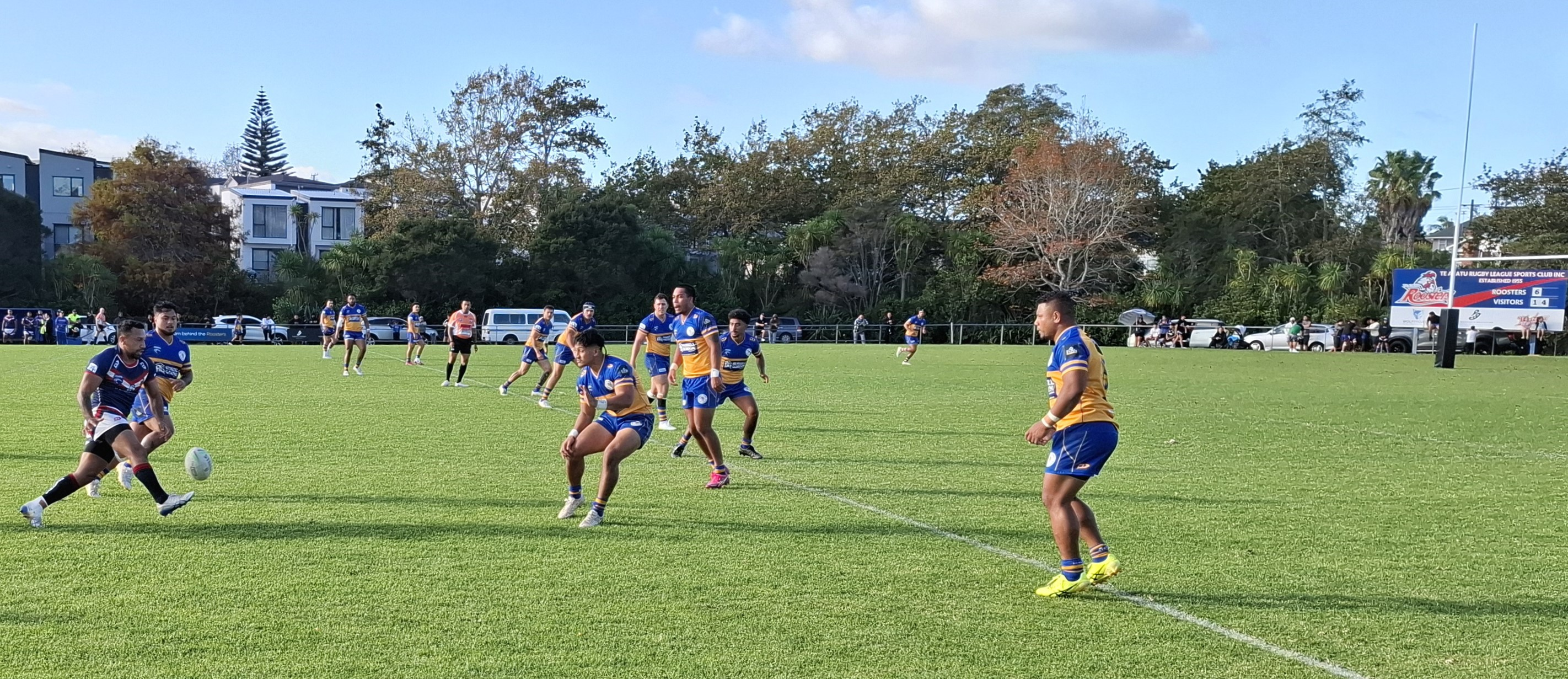
Charvez Watts Ikitule kicking ahead for Te Atatu during their second half comeback at Jack Colvin Park.

Marist trailed Richmond 30-0 after 48 minutes but fought back to make the score a more respectable 30-16. Trujon Nomani-Brown and Waikare Ratima both scored doubles for Richmond who claimed the Eddie Poching Memorial Cup. At Blockhouse Bay Reserve the teams traded tries in the first half with the Vikings taking an 18-16 lead into the break. The Vikings defence held the Ponies out for 39 second half minutes and ran in three tries to claim a ten point win. Xavier Tutaki scored twice for the home side with prolific point scorer Joshua Tanielu kicking four goals to go with a try. Manukau hung around against Papakura at Moyle Park and with 7 minutes to go only trailed 22-16 but the Sea Eagles sealed the win with a late try to Jarney Proctor. Te Atatu scored the upset of the round holding Mt Albert scoreless from the 30th minute to come back from 14-6 down to win 21-14. Zensei Inu organised the backline well with France Leger's clever kicking causing trouble and leading to Patrick Ioane-Unasa's winning try in the right corner following a Leger break and angled kick. Jeremiah Poutu scored a double for Mt Albert against his former team of the past two seasons. At Bert Henham Park, Otahuhu won their fifth straight game clearing out to a 20-6 halftime lead and scoring three more second half tries against a new look Point Chevalier side.

10 May	Marist	16-30 (0-20)	Richmond	Murray Halberg 1
2:30	Try: Jahvaan Manukau Powell (62m), Doux Kauhiva (67m), Montell Matamu Tuese (71m); Con: Doux Kauhiva 2/3 (67m, 72m)		Try: Beau Cordtz (6m), Trujon Nomani-Brown 2 (15m, 45m), Waikare Ratima 2 (29m, 48m), Daniel Sausau (32m); Con: Beau Cordtz 3/6 (17m, 33m, 46m)	Referee: Daniel Caddy (TJ's: Warren Clarke and Kemo Teariki)

10 May	Bay Roskill	32-22 (18-16)	Ponsonby	Blockhouse Bay Reserve 4
2:30	Try: Xavier Tutaki 2 (2m, 70m), Joshua Tanielu (9m), Sebastian Hindt (40m), Jerome Vogel (54m), Amanaki Veamatahau (64m); Con: Joshua Tanielu 4/6 (4m, 11m, 41m, 71m)		Try: Timor Williams (20m), Heitony Talagi (29m), Felise Tau (34m), Siapo Pasene (80m); Con: Charles Gabriel 3/4 (30m, 36m, 80m)	Referee: Paki Parkinson (TJ's: Joshua Siaki and Corey Jull)

10 May	Manukau	16-28 (6-16)	Papakura	Moyle Park 1
2:30	Try: Taunga Arama (22m), Koronato John (54m), Moreketai Moananu (72m); Con: Fred Muller 2/3 (23m, 73m)		Try: TJ Salima-Satuia (13m), Siave Togoiu 2 (31m, 60m), Christopher Masina Tuivai-Lopa (36m), Jarney Proctor (78m); Con: James Dowie 3 (15m, 32m, 80m), Jacob Paulo (61m)	Referee: Chris McMillan (TJ's: Hemana Ryan and Michael Une)

10 May	Te Atatu	21-14 (6-14)	Mt Albert	Jack Colvin 1
2:30	Try: Tasimani Lotima (9m), Romeo Schumann (56m), Kane Lefleur (61m), Patrick Ioane-Unasa (74m); Con: Francis Leger 2/4 (10m, 75m); Drop: Francis Leger (79m)		Try: Unknown (21m), Jeremiah Poutu 2 (25m, 30m); Con: Dion Fraser 1/3 (21m)	Referee: Keven Ah-Ken (TJ's: Chris Eagle and Leigh Fletcher)

10 May	Otahuhu	36-14 (20-6)	Pt Chevalier	Bert Henham Park 1
2:30	Try: Jamel Hunt (5m), Andrew Nansen (11m), Viliami Kuli (27m), Toaiti Ramsey (38m), Sebastine Ikahihifo (59m), Phoenix Hunt (62m), Mosese Faeamani (69m); Con: Bostyn Hakaraia 4/7 (7m, 29m, 61m, 64m)		Try: Unknown (15m), Garry Tuilekutu (57m), Unknown (58m); Con: Noah Jensen (17m)	Referee: Leon Williamson (TJ's: Taura Taura and Tameilau Pauuvale)

===== Round 3 =====
It took a 77th minute try to Ollie Horgan for Richmond to beat Bay Roskill who had levelled the scores minutes earlier with a converted try to Joshua Tanielu. The match was recorded for You Tube by G2G Productions. At Murray Halberg Park, Marist opened the scoring with a try to Jahvaan Powell converted by Doux Kauhiva however they scored no further points with Manukau running in three tries all converted by Fred Muller to give them their first win. Mount Albert claimed the Roope Rooster trophy for the first time since 2020 with an 18-12 win against Ponsonby at Victoria Park which had not seen a Fox Memorial competition game for decades after being the early home of Auckland rugby league in the 1910s before the creation of Carlaw Park. They only led 8-6 at halftime before edging out to victory. Rory Ropati the veteran Mt Albert forward broke his arm in two places and was ruled out for the season. Two of the competition favourites met at Prince Edward Park with Otahuhu winning comfortably 34-10 after taking a 12-6 lead into the break. William Fakatoumafi converted four of their tries. Point Chevalier took over their game in the second half against Te Atatu after only leading 16-14 at halftime. Tyrone Hurt-Pickering converted three of their six tries.

17 May	Richmond	28-24 (12-12)	Bay Roskill	Grey Lynn Park 2
2:30	Try: Mike Williams (8m), Ollie Horgan 2 (30m, 77m), Unknown (45m), Daniel Sausau (69m); Con: Hawaiiki Annandale 4/5 (9m, 32m, 46m, 71m)		Try: Joel Leaoseve (1m), Renouf Oge (17m), Ezekial Paul (64m), Joshua Tanielu (73m); Con: Joshua Tanielu 4/4 (2m, 19m, 66m, 75m)	Referee: Daniel Caddy, (TJs: Ryan Doherty and Warren Clarke)

17 May	Marist	6-18 (6-12)	Manukau	Murray Halberg 1
2:30	Try: Jahvaan Powell (14m); Con: Doux Kauhiva 1/1 (15m)		Try: Akuila Tuha (29m), Kahn Munokoa (35m), Paea Folau (59m); Con: Fred Muller 3/3 (29m 36m, 61m)	Referee: Leon Williamson, (TJ's: Hemana Ryan and Chris Eagle)

17 May	Ponsonby	12-18 (6-8)	Mt Albert	Victoria Park 1
2:30	Try: Daymon Abbey (28m), Kingston Manley (60m); Con: Charles Gabriel 2/2 (29m, 62m)		Try: John Aitu 2 (5m, 50m), Unknown (21m), Lyrakai-Layke Posimani (45m); Con: Navajo Doyle (51m)	Referee: Anthony Elliott, (TJ's: Corey Jull and Leigh Fletcher)

17 May	Papakura	10-34 (6-12)	Otahuhu	Prince Edward Park 1
2:30	Try: James Dowie (17m), Christopher Tuivai-Lopa (70m); Con: James Dowie (19m)		Try: Jamel Hunt (3m), William Fakatoumafi (35m), Ben Wharton-Benedict (43m), Andrew Nansen (52m), Sebastine Ikahihifo (64m), Phoenix Hunt (78m); Con: William Fakatoumafi 4/5 (4m, 44m, 65m, 79m), Bostyn Hakaraia 1/1 (36m)	Referee: Paki Parkinson, (TJ's: Tameilau Pauuvale and Micheal Une)

17 May	Te Atatu	20-32 (14-16)	Point Chevalier	Jack Colvin 1
2:30	Try: Clive Tu'ifua (13m), Patrick Ioane-Unasa 2 (26m, 31m), Rhys Wikitera (64m); Con: Francis Leger 2/4 (14m, 65m)		Try: Unknown (3m), Unknown (21m), Unknown (39m), Unknown (41m), Unknown (44m), Unknown (79m); Con: Unknown (27m), Tyrone Hurt-Pickering 3 (40m, 43m, 45m)	Referee: Chris McMillan, (TJ's: Kemo Teariki and Paul Lorigan)

===== Round 4 =====
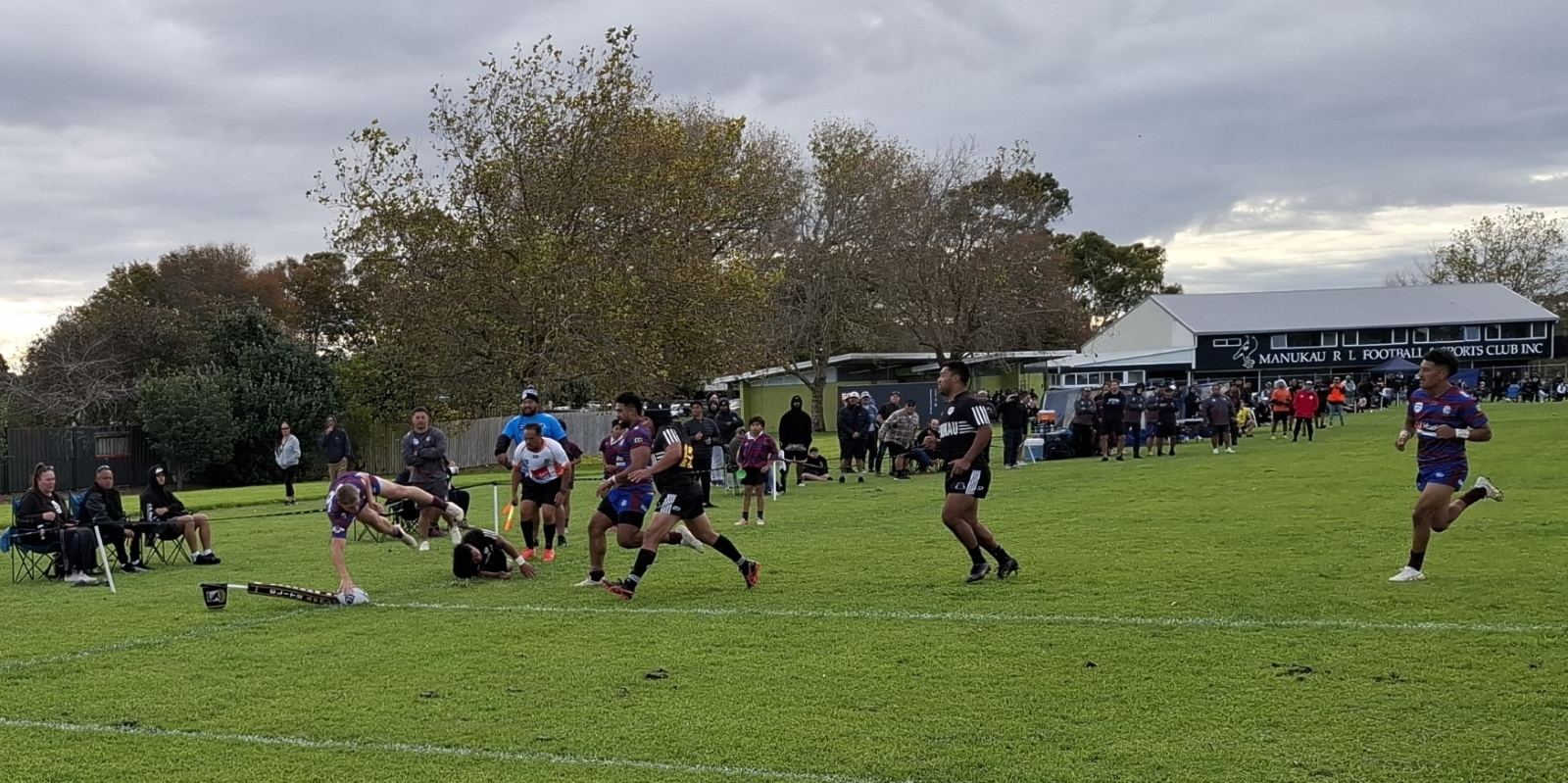
Ollie Horgan has his try for Richmond disallowed after putting a foot on the touchline before his dive.

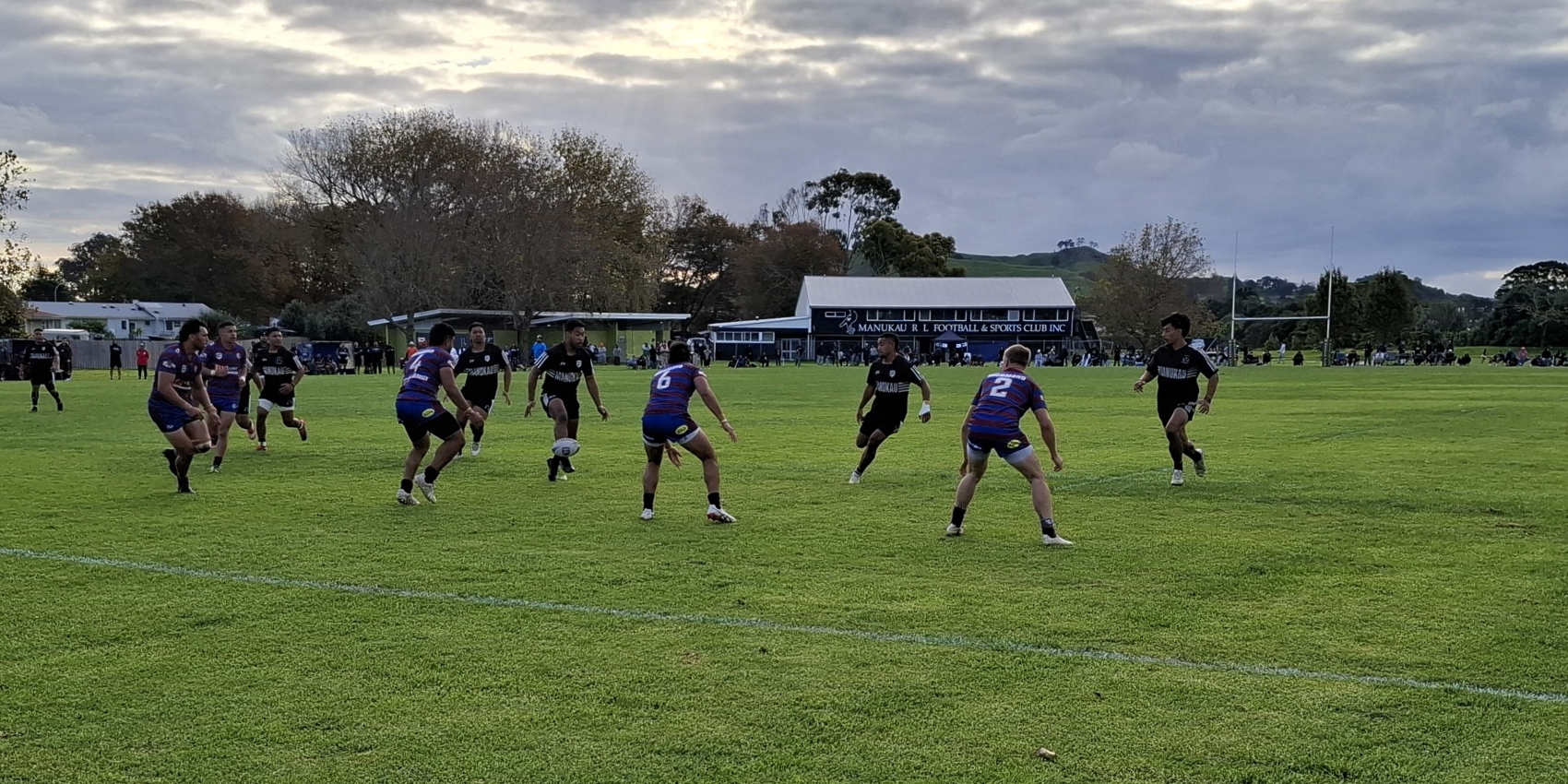
Samuel Nati sliding a kick through in the second half of Manukau's win over Richmond.

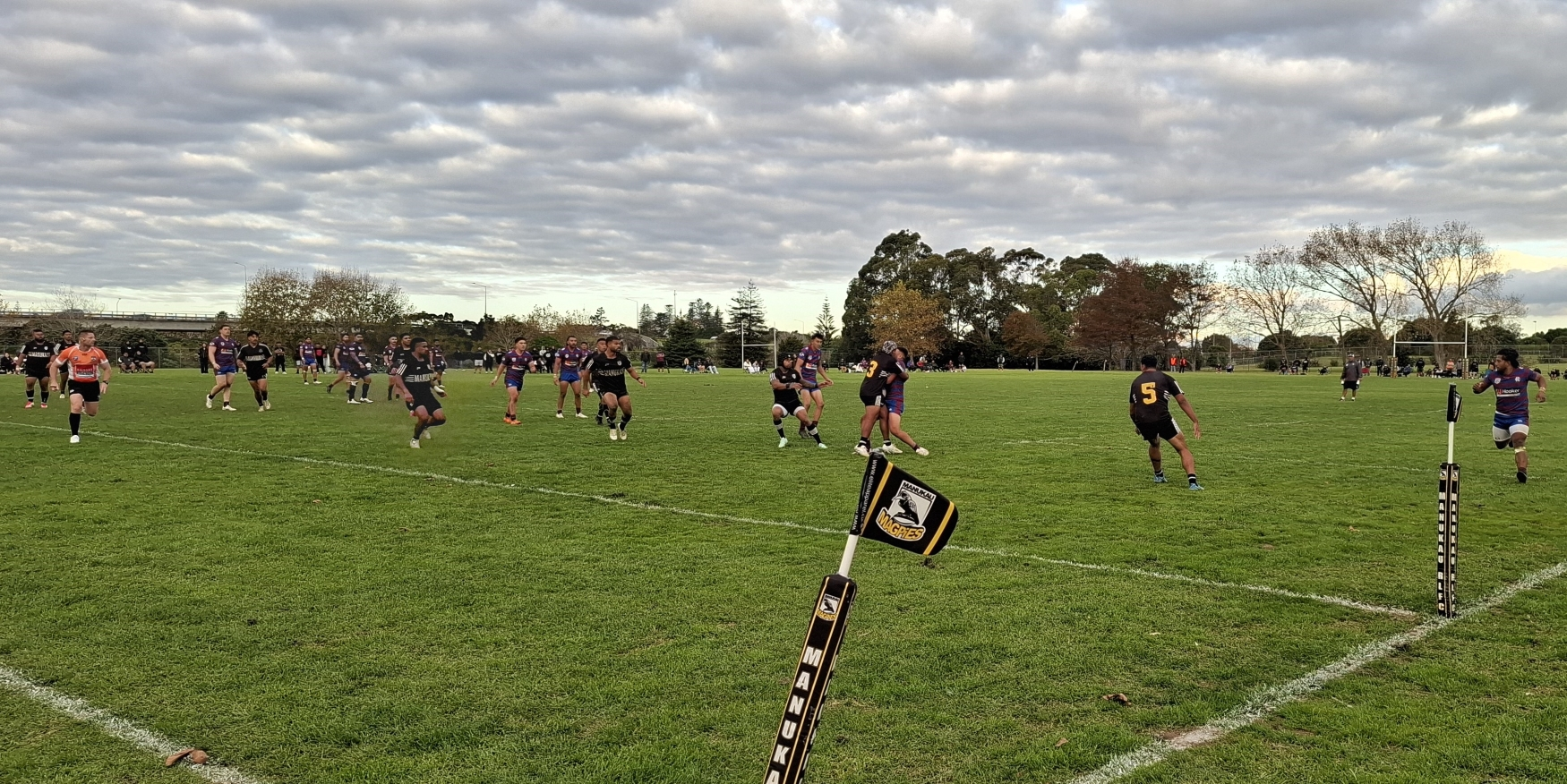
Paea Fotu in a bear hug tackle of his opposite as Manukau held a goal line stand for ten minutes late in the match.

Manukau claimed a rugged 22-6 win over Richmond at Moyle Park. They opened the scoring with a try to Taunga Arama before Richmond leveled the scores in the 32nd minute with a converted try to Delamo Atai. On the stroke of halftime the Magpies retook the lead with Paea Fotu crashing over for a 10-6 lead. The second half saw the game stopped for ten minutes after Koronato John was knocked unconscious going in low for a tackle on a Richmond centre. He was eventually able to slowly walk off the field and went to hospital as a precaution. Fred Muller extended the lead to 6 with a 64th minute penalty and then Manukau held Richmond out for repeat sets which included Richmond captain Casey Tomai busting through and nearly scoring but sustaining a head injury and having to leave the field. Manukau moved on to attack and a second try to Arama sealed the game in the 77th minute, with Desmond To'ofohe sneaking across from the play the ball on full time to blow the score out. The Manukau coach told the Counties Sports Hub that "we definitely defended our way to victory... we lost three players through injury the week before against Marist and then another three on Saturday, so we had to put forwards in the backline... through adversity they worked really hard for each other which allowed us to get the win". At Fowlds Park, Mount Albert ran away with the game in the second half with backs Thompson Karena and Isaiah Fale both scoring doubles and Navajo Doyle converting all seven of their tries. Otahuhu continued on their way with yet another thrashing, beating Marist 62-4 at Bert Henham Park after leading 26-0 at halftime. William Fakatoumafi scored twice and added nine conversions for a personal tally of 26. Last years Fox player of the year Fine Vakautakakala scored his first try for his new club in the 30th minute. Tevita Mikaele and Phoenix Hunt also scored doubles. At Prince Edward Park the visiting Te Atatu side nearly sprang a surprise, tying the score in the 76th minute with a try to Moses Oge. It capped a furious second half comeback which saw 16 points in 14 minutes to bring them back from 26-10 down. Francis Leger missed the go ahead conversion before Papakura were awarded a penalty in the 79th minute which James Dowie goaled for a 32-30 win. Tamehana Paruru scored a double for the Sea Eagles while Patrick Ioane-Unasa did the same for the Roosters.

24 May	Manukau	22-6 (10-6)	Richmond	Moyle Park 1
2:30	Try: Taunga Arama 2 (19m, 77m), Paea Fotu (39m), Desmond To'ofohe (80m); Con: Fred Muller 2/4 (21m, 78m); Pen: Fred Muller 1/1 (64m)		Try: Delamo Atai 1/1 (32m); Con: Hawaiiki Annandale (32m)	Attendance: 300; Referee: Chris McMillan, (TJ's: Hemana Ryan and Kahi Thompson)

24 May	Mt Albert	42-16 (18-12)	Bay Roskill	Fowlds Park 1
2:30	Try: Thompson Karena 2 (1m, 28m), John Aitu (4m), Isaiah Fale 2 (50m, 75m), Kalepo Paualaisa (59m), Chaz Brown (80m); Con: Navajo Doyle 7/7 (3m, 30m, 45m, 51m, 61m, 77m, 80m)		Try: Xavier Tutaki (12m), Renouf Oge (22m), Joshua Tanielu (69m); Con: Joshua Tanielu 2/3 (13, 23m)	Referee: Paki Parkinson, (TJ's: Tameilau Pauuvale and Leigh Fletcher)

24 May	Otahuhu	62-4 (26-0)	Marist	Bert Henham Park 1
2:30	Try: Jamel Hunt (3m), Siona Tesese (12m), Emeliano Mikaele (15m), William Fakatoumafi 2 (22m, 67m), Fine Vakautakakala (30m), Albert Vete (42m), Tevita Mikaele 2 (49m, 61m), Phoenix Hunt 2 (59m, 71m); Con: William Fakatoumafi 9/11 (4m, 23m, 31m, 44m, 50m, 60m, 63m, 68m, 72m)		Try: Isileli Ula (78m)	Referee: Anthony Eliott (TJ's: Nigel Williams and ?)

24 May	Point Chevalier	58-12	Ponsonby	Walker Park 2
2:30	Try: Jovilisi Jake Sloan 4, Taipari Wikitera 2, Garry Tuilekutu 2, Setu Tu, Malakai Cama, James Marriott; Con: James Marriott 7/10, Setu Tu 0/1		Try: Siapo Pasene, Kingston Bradlee Manley; Con: Charles Gabriel 2/2	Referee: Daniel Caddy (TJ's: Warren Clarke and Paul Lorrigan)

24 May	Papakura	32-30 (22-10)	Te Atatu	Prince Edward Park 1
2:30	Try: Polou Kosi (2m), Tamehana Paruru 2 (5m, 65m), Lewis Soosemea (17m), Siave Togoiu (32m), Joshua Tafili (41m); Con: James Dowie 3/6 (4m, 6m, 18m); Pen: James Dowie (79m)		Try: Patrick Ioane-Unasa 2 (9m, 46m), Josh Samuels (27m), Clive Tu'ifua (52m), Kane Lefleur (60m), Moses Oge (74m); Con: Francis Leger 3/6 (29m, 47m, 52m)	Referee: Leon Williamson

===== Round 5 =====
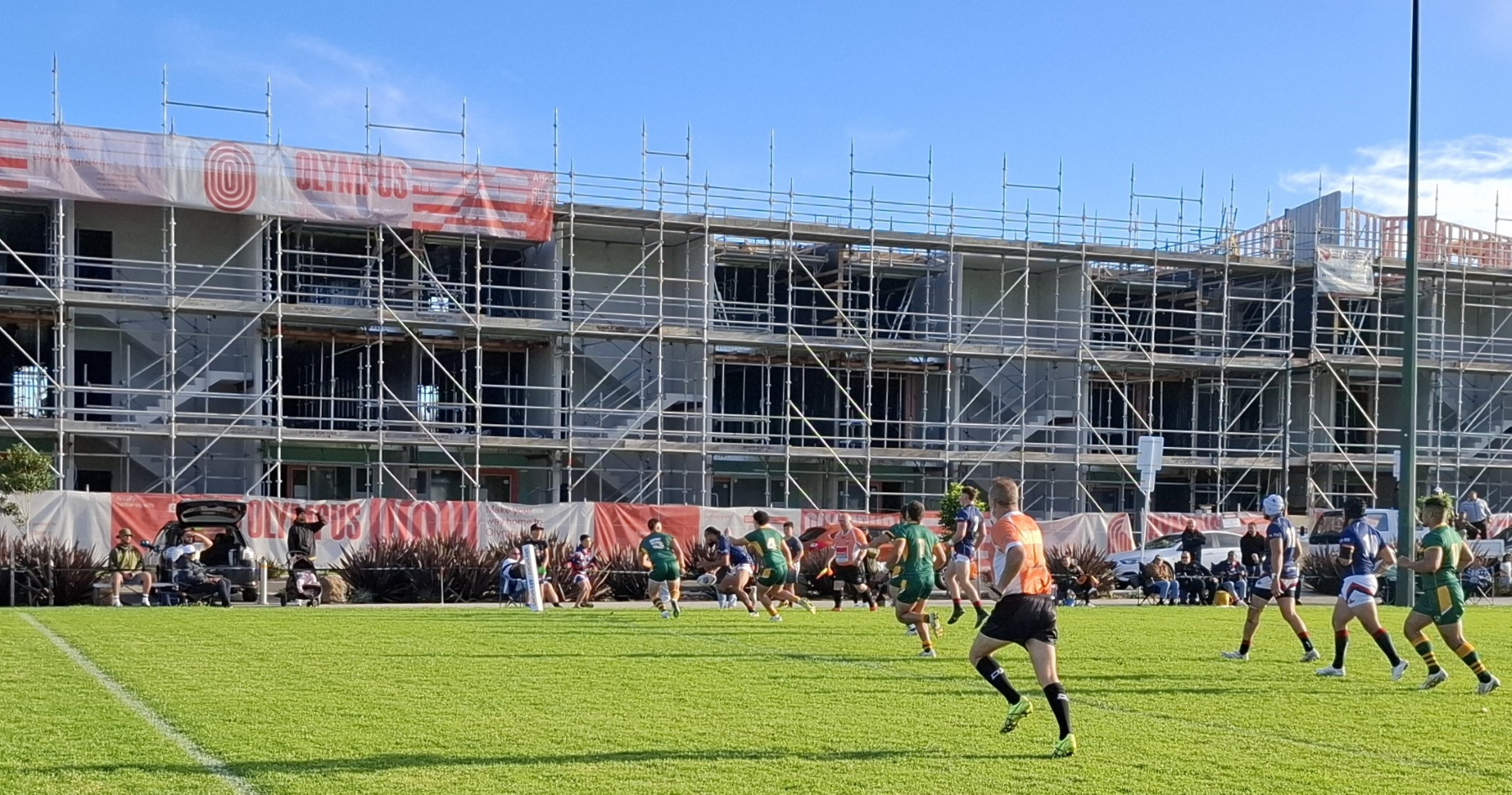
Patrick Ioane-Unasa scoring his second try in the 46th minute for Te Atatu.

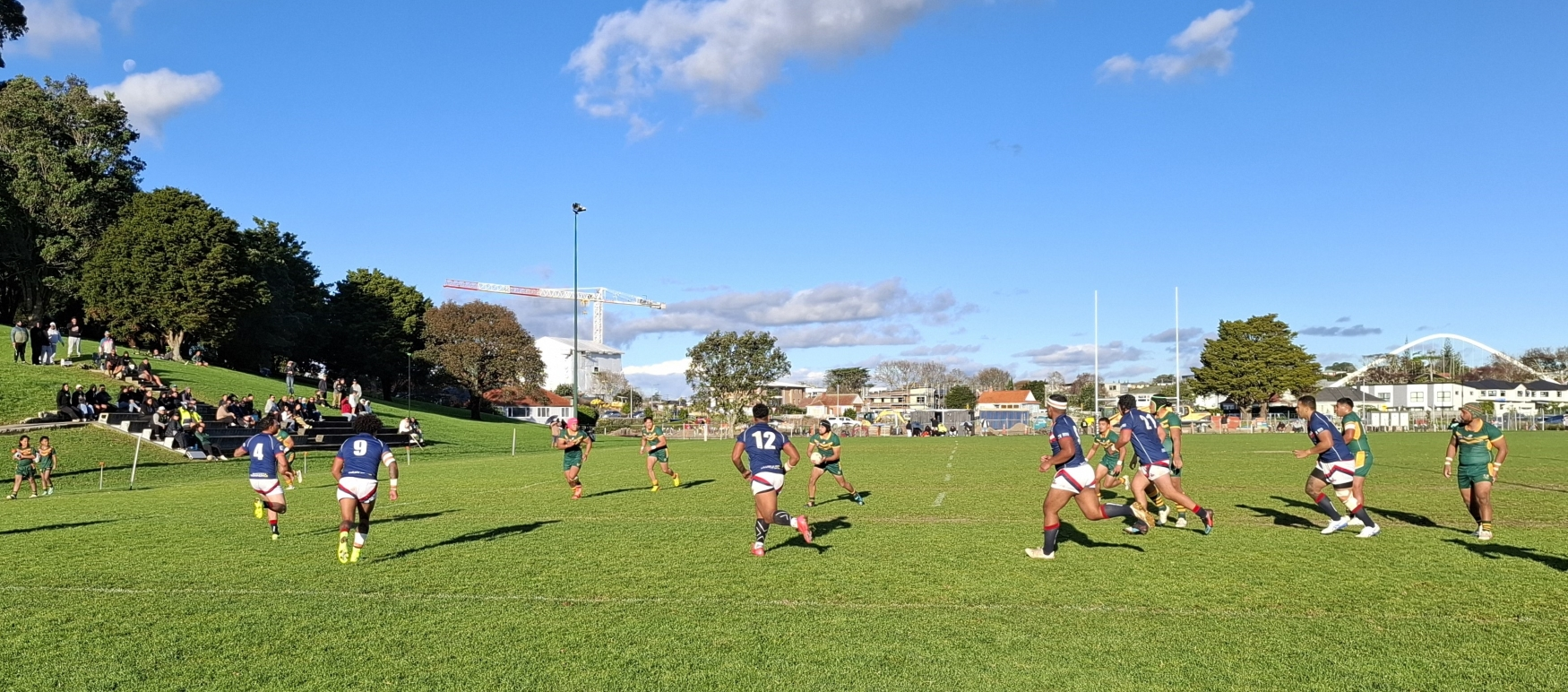
Doux Kauhiva about to grubber the ball into the in goal for Montell Tuese to follow through and score in the 55th minute.

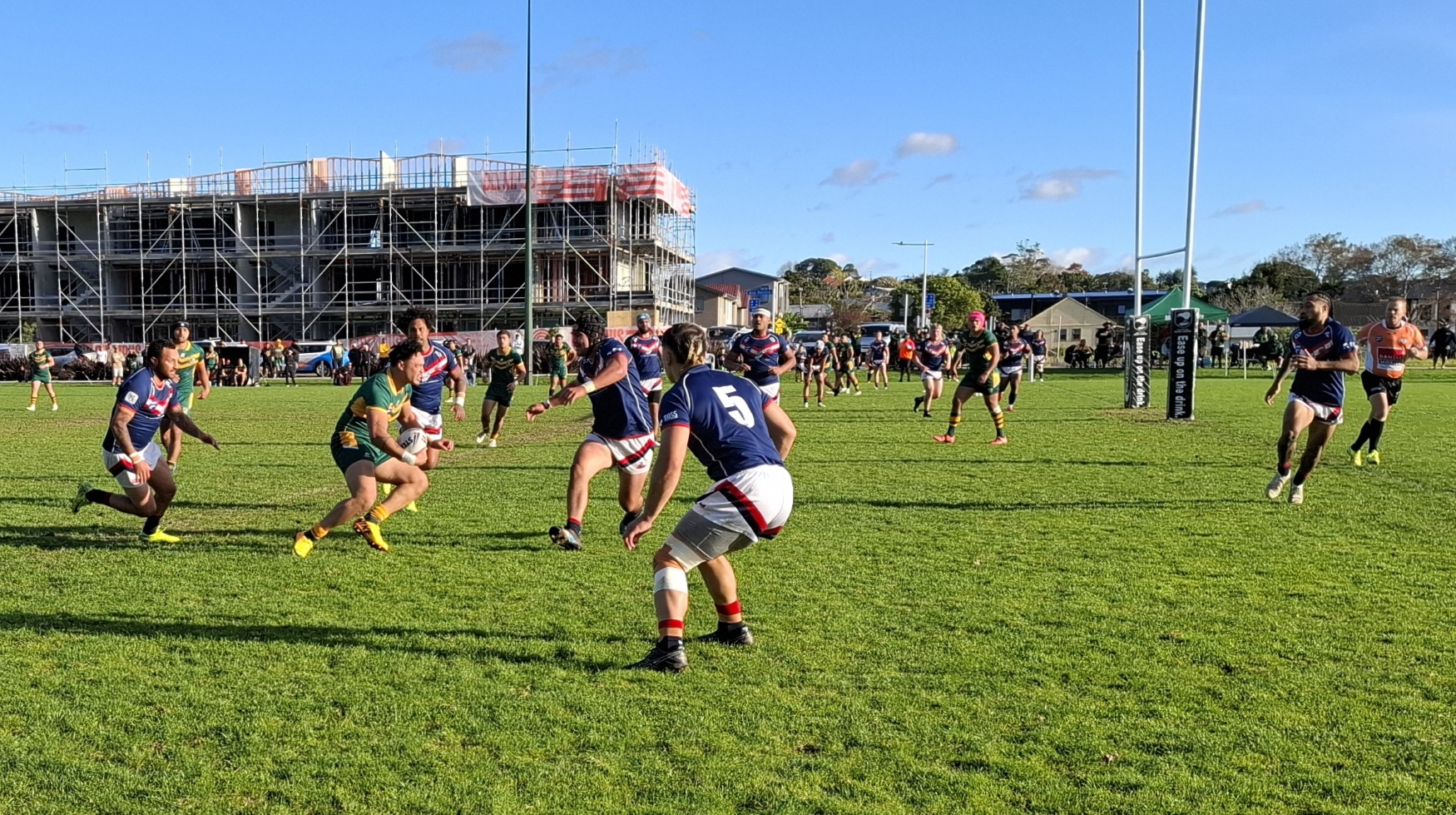
Lani Graham-Taufa surrounded by defenders during the second half of their 42-28 win over Te Atatu.

Mount Albert dominated Richmond at Grey Lynn Park, leading 18-0 at halftime and running in five more second half tries. Otahuhu continued on their winning ways with 8 straight including the grading round. The Counties Sports Hub had written prior to the game "the Leopards have been the competitions standout team through the first couple of months - breezing through the qualifiers unbeaten before winning four from four in the premiership". Phoenix Hunt played in his 50th senior game for Otahuhu and capped it with a first half try in their 42-4 over Manukau at Moyle Park. Prop, Connor Taurua-Purcell scored once in each half while William Fakatoumafi converted four tries. At Blockhouse Bay Reserve the visiting Point Chevalier side had a comfortable 52-20 after taking a 32-6 halftime lead. They had eight different try scorers with Mitchell Bebbington scoring twice. James Marriott scored a try and kicked five conversions while Etuate Fukofuka kicking three conversions to go with a try. With the win Otahuhu won the Jack Wright Cup. For Bay Roskill, veteran Ben Henry scored a try while Josh Tanielu crossed for his 4th try in as many games and also converted two tries. Marist dominated field position and possession for almost the entire game against Te Atatu but the Roosters managed to score each time they had a rare opportunity to stay in touch until the 70th minute when the Saints put the game out of reach with tries to Elijah Sami and Lani Graham-Taufa. The Marist forwards restricted Te Atatu to short set gains while marching down field when in possession. For Marist, Graham-Taufa scored twice while Doux Kauhiva scored a 70m runaway try and kicked five conversions. For Te Atatu wingers Romeo Schumann and Patrick Ioane-Unasa scored doubles. At Victoria Park the Papakura team led 22-0 at halftime and ran away with the game in the second half. There had been a long injury break in the first half when Pupi Miller was badly injured and required St John's Ambulance attention before the game could restart. For the Sea Eagles former Tongan rugby international Viliami Lolohea scored twice while James Dowie scored three tries and kicked two conversions. Jordan Kake and Joshua Tafili also scored doubles while another former Tongan rugby international Walter Fifita converted five tries.

7 June	Richmond	6-48 (0-18)	Mt Albert	Grey Lynn Park 2
2:30	Try: Ioane Iosua (74m); Con: Darius Niumata (76m)		Try: Unknown (28m), Unknown (35m), Unknown (39m), Unknown (45m), Kahil Johnson (49m), Unknown (54m), Unknown (60m), Phoenix Sorenson (71m); Con: Navajo Doyle (29m, 36m, 40m, 46m, 50m), Unknown (55m, 62m); Pen: Unknown (76m)	Attendance: 200; Referee: Paki Parkinson, (TJs: Ryan Doherty and Leigh Fletcher)

7 June	Manukau	4-42 (0-18)	Otahuhu	Moyle Park 1
2:30	Try: Bailey Vaeau (57m); Con: Bailey Vaeau 0/1		Try: Sione Feao (3m), Connor Taurua-Purcell 2 (32m, 41m), Andrew Nansen (37m), Phoenix Hunt (45m), Tevita Mikaele (67m), Viliami Kuli (71m), William Fakatoumafi (76m); Con: William Fakatoumafi 4/7 (4m, 33m, 39m, 42m), Bostyn Hakaraia 1/1 (77m)	Attendance: 300; Referee: Daniel Caddy, (TJ's: Kone Lavea and Tameilau Pauuvale, Match Manager: Heather Walker)

7 June	Bay Roskill	20-52 (6-32)	Pt Chevalier	Blockhouse Bay Reserve 4
2:30	Try: Ben Henry (28m), Mackenzie Kata (46m), Zacchaeus Cordtz (57m), Josh Tanielu (62m); Con: Josh Tanielu 2/4 (30m, 48m)		Try: Malakai Cama (7m), James Marriot (12m), Taipari Wikitera (20m), Patrick Sipley (23m), Mitchell Bebbington 2 (33m, 42m), Caleb Laiman (36m), Mikaele Ilaiu (75m), Etuate Fukofuka (80m); Con: James Marriott 5 (13m, 21m, 35m, 38m, 43m), Etuate Fukofuka 3 (25m, 76m, 80m)	Attendance: 250; Referee: Anthony Eliott, (TJ's: Warren Clarke and Maxine Godinet)

7 June	Marist	42-28 (28-10)	Te Atatu	Murray Halberg Park 1
2:30	Try: Jahvaan Powell (18m), Lani Graham-Taufa 2 (27m, 77m), Matt Halalova (30m), Doux Kauhiva (36m), Takaia Williams (38m), Montell Tuese (55m), Elijah Sami (70m); Con: Doux Kauhiva 5/8 (28m, 32m, 36m, 57m, 78m)		Try: Romeo Schumann 2 (5m, 21m), Patrick Ioane-Unasa 2 (41m, 45m), Lucas Adams (64m); Con: Francis Leger 1/2 (6m), Lucas Adams 2/2 (42m, 46m), Inoke Kupu 1/1 (66m)	Attendance: 200; Referee: Chris McMillan, (TJ's: Chris Eagle and Paul Lorigan)

7 June	Ponsonby	6-64 (0-22)	Papakura	Victoria Park 1
2:30	Try: Daymon Abbey (70m); Con: Charles Gabriel (71m)		Try: Jarney Proctor (1m), Stedman Lefau (11m), Viliami Lolohea 2 (15m, 62m), James Dowie 3 (31m, 43m, 48m), Jordan Kake 2 (53m, 65m), Joshua Tafili 2 (44m, 59m), Liam Prendergast (74m); Con: James Dowie 2 (2m, 12m), Walter Fifita 5 (16m, 43m, 49m, 53m, 60m), Joshua Tafili (66m)	Attendance: 150; Referee: Leon Williamson, (TJ's: Hemana Ryan and Michael Une)

===== Round 6 =====
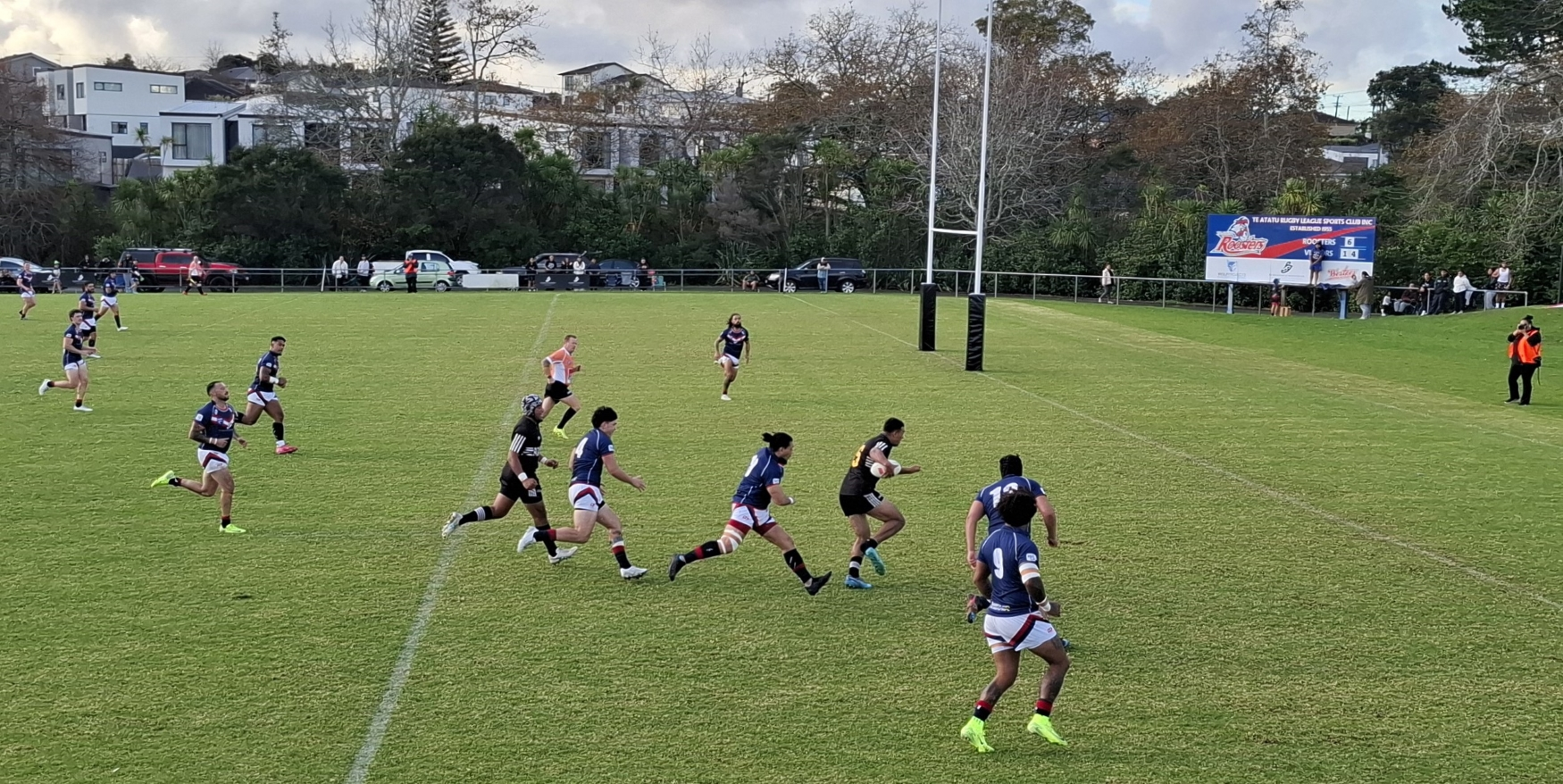
Kahn Munokoa cutting through to score the first of his three tries for Manukau.

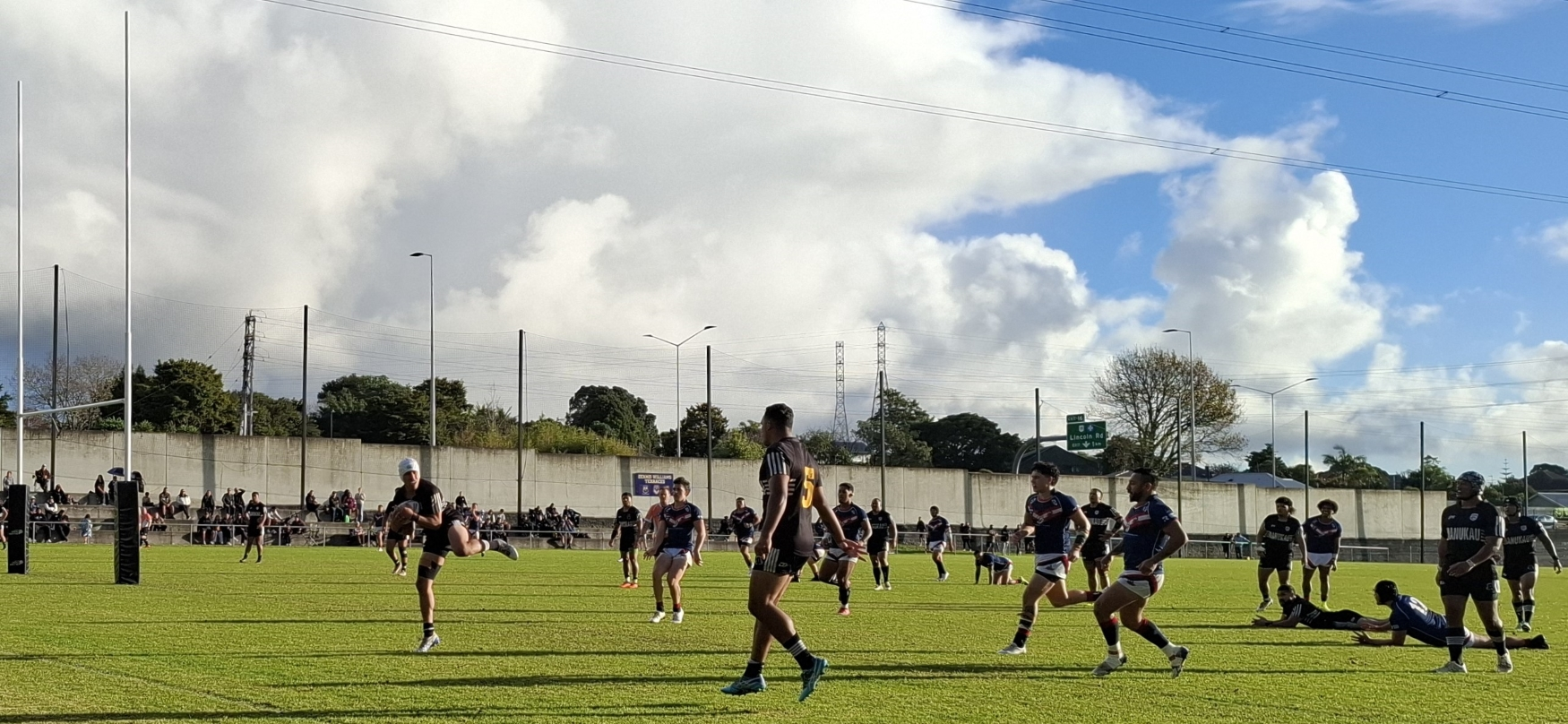
Shay Stevens (Manukau) taking a chip in his in goal during the second half of their win over Te Atatu.

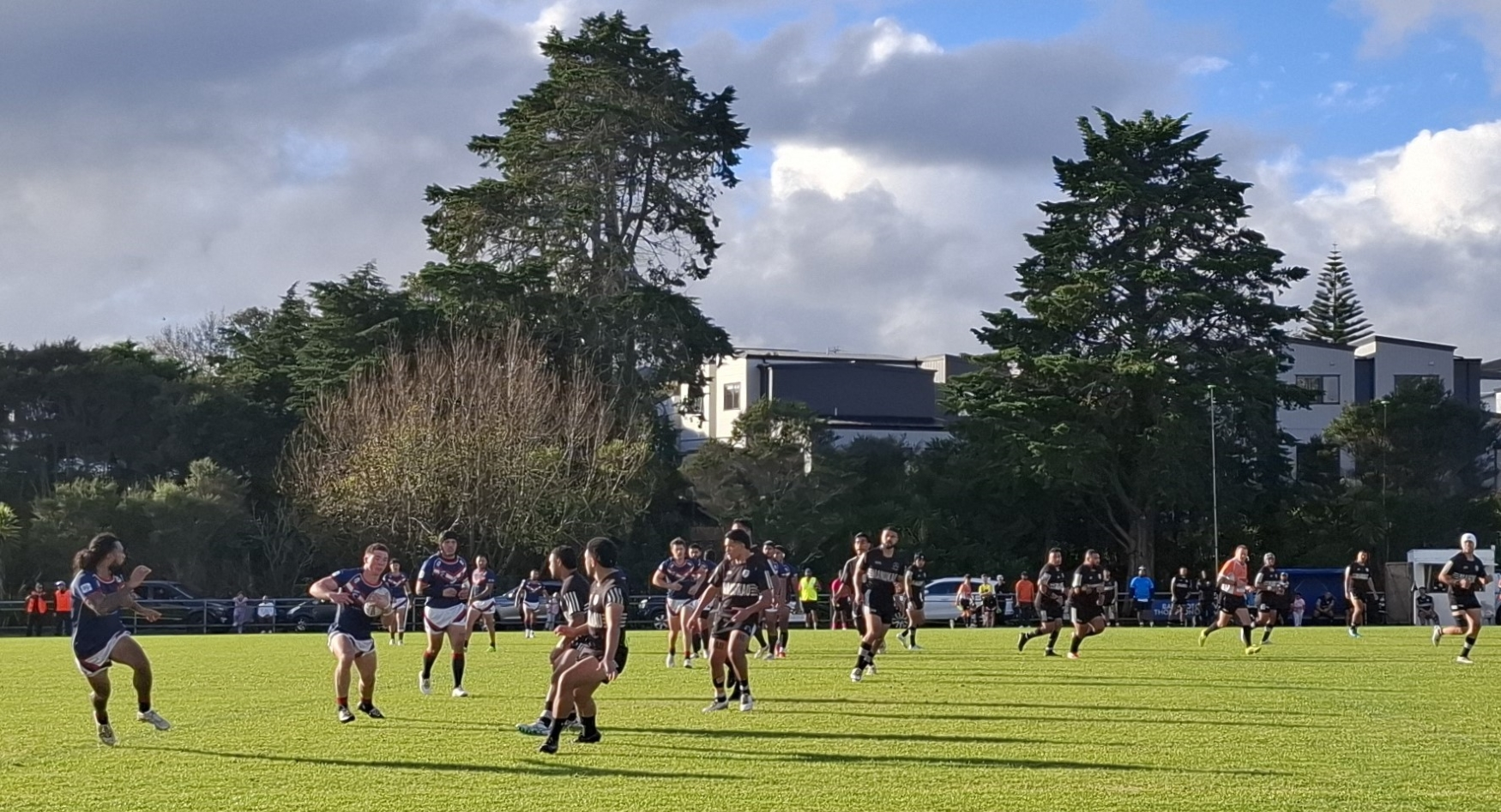
Lucas Adams, who recently debuted for Te Atatu at centre bringing the ball to the line.

Otahuhu continued their dominant run beating last years champions, Richmond, 50-0. Phoenix Hunt scored a first half hat trick with Soakai Taufa scoring tries either side of half time. William Fakatoumafi scored a try to go with 7 conversions. At Walker Park, Mt Albert were 22-14 winners in a game between two form sides with Mt Albert also claiming the Lani Latoa Cup. Latoa died after falling on a ball and breaking his wind pipe while playing for the North Harbour Sea Eagles at Carlaw Park in 1995. The Lions opened the scoring after they regained possession after contesting a kick. A shift to the left saw Kalepo Paualaisa cut through to score. The Lions moved out to a 16-0 lead before Taipari Wikitera scored twice and Garry Tuilekutu once to bring the Pirates back to 16-14. The Lions finished the game off when Kahil Johnson scored by the posts. An injury plagued Te Atatu side struggled against Manukau who had Samuel Nati back from injury. Semisini Lopeti scored a 90m intercept against the run of play early in the game but from then on it was all the Magpies with experienced players Kahn Munokoa (3), captain Desmond To'ofohe (2), Sione Toutai, and Samuel Nati scoring tries. Te Atatu scored a couple of late consolation tries. Following the 79th minute try to Kane Lefleur the referee Leon Williamson called out Manukau centre Paea Fotu from the Manukau huddle and ordered him from the field. Prior to their game with Bay Roskill, the Papakura coach, Ruka Loza told the Counties Manukau Sports Hub we are "looking forward to the game this week as we look to build on the things we did well last week... Bay Roskill have a decent back five so we need to do a good job on trying to limit their metres and be clinical on out attack". Papakura moved out to a 22-0 halftime lead before Bay Roskill mounted a comeback with three tries to narrow the score to 22-16 before late tries to Walter Fifita and Viliami Lolohea sealed the win for the Sea Eagles. At Victoria Park, Marist led 16-0 after 14 minutes but Ponsonby replied with tries to Timor Williams and Molisoni Faiva. Marist gradually widened their margin though to win 44-22. For the Saints, Lani Graham-Taufa scored three tries and Sione Langatau two with Doux Kauhiva kicking six goals.

13 June	Otahuhu	50-0 (24-0)	Richmond	Bert Henham Park 1
2:30	Try: Phoenix Hunt 3 (7m, 33m, 36m), Soakai Taufa 2 (21m, 41m), Sione Feao (45m), William Fakatoumafi (49m), Andrew Nansen 2 (60m, 71m); Con: William Fakatoumafi 7/9 (8m, 22m, 34m, 37m, 42m, 50m, 62m)			Referee: Chris McMillan, TJ's: Warren Clarke and Maxine Godinet

13 June	Pt Chevalier	14-22 (0-6)	Mt Albert	Walker Park 2
2:30	Try: Taipari Wikitera 2, Garry Tuilekutu; Con: Unknown 1		Try: Kalepo Paualaisa 2, Unknown, Kahil Johnson; Con: Unknown 3	Attendance: 250; Referee: Paki Parkinson, TJ's: Ryan Doherty and Corey Jull

13 June	Te Atatu	18-36 (6-20)	Manukau	Jack Colvin Park 1
2:30	Try: Semisini Lopeti (8m), Dorian Gaugatao (60m), Kane Lefleur (79m); Con: Francis Leger 1/1 (8m), Lucas Adams 2/2 (61m, 80m)		Try: Sione Toutai (12m), Desmond To'ofohe 2 (19m, 67m), Kahn Munokoa 3 (28m, 37m, 43m), Samuel Nati (57m); Con: Fred Muller 3/6 (22m, 38m, 68m)	Attendance: 200; Referee: Leon Williamson, TJ's: Paul Lorigan and Rhino Clayton

13 June	Papakura	32-16 (22-0)	Bay Roskill	Prince Edward Park 1
2:30	Try: Jarney Proctor 2 (15m, 40m), Siave Togoiu (31m), Arthur Crichton (36m), Walter Fifita (76m), Viliami Lolohea (79m); Con: James Dowie 4/6 (16m, 38m, 41m, 77m)		Try: Zacchaeus Cordtz (46m), Silas Toala (65m), Ariki Honetana-Paea (71m); Con: Joshua Tanielu 2/3 (46m, 73m)	Referee: Daniel Caddy, TJ's: Rebecca Ellison and Curtis Wharewaka

13 June	Ponsonby	22-44 (12-26)	Marist	Victoria Park 1
2:30	Try: Timor Williams (21m), Molisoni Faiva (23m), Sasha Urale (41m), Centurion Siulepa (64m); Con: David Otukolo 3/4 (22m, 24m, 65m)		Try: Lani Graham-Taufa 3 (3m, 51m, 74m), Sione Langatau 2 (7m, 48m), Takaia Williams (12m), Draven Sao (27m), Elam Payne (36m); Con: Doux Kauhiva 6/8 (4m, 14m, 37m, 50m, 53m, 75m)	Referee: Anthony Eliott, TJ's: Leigh Fletcher and Oliver Broadhead

===== Round 7 =====
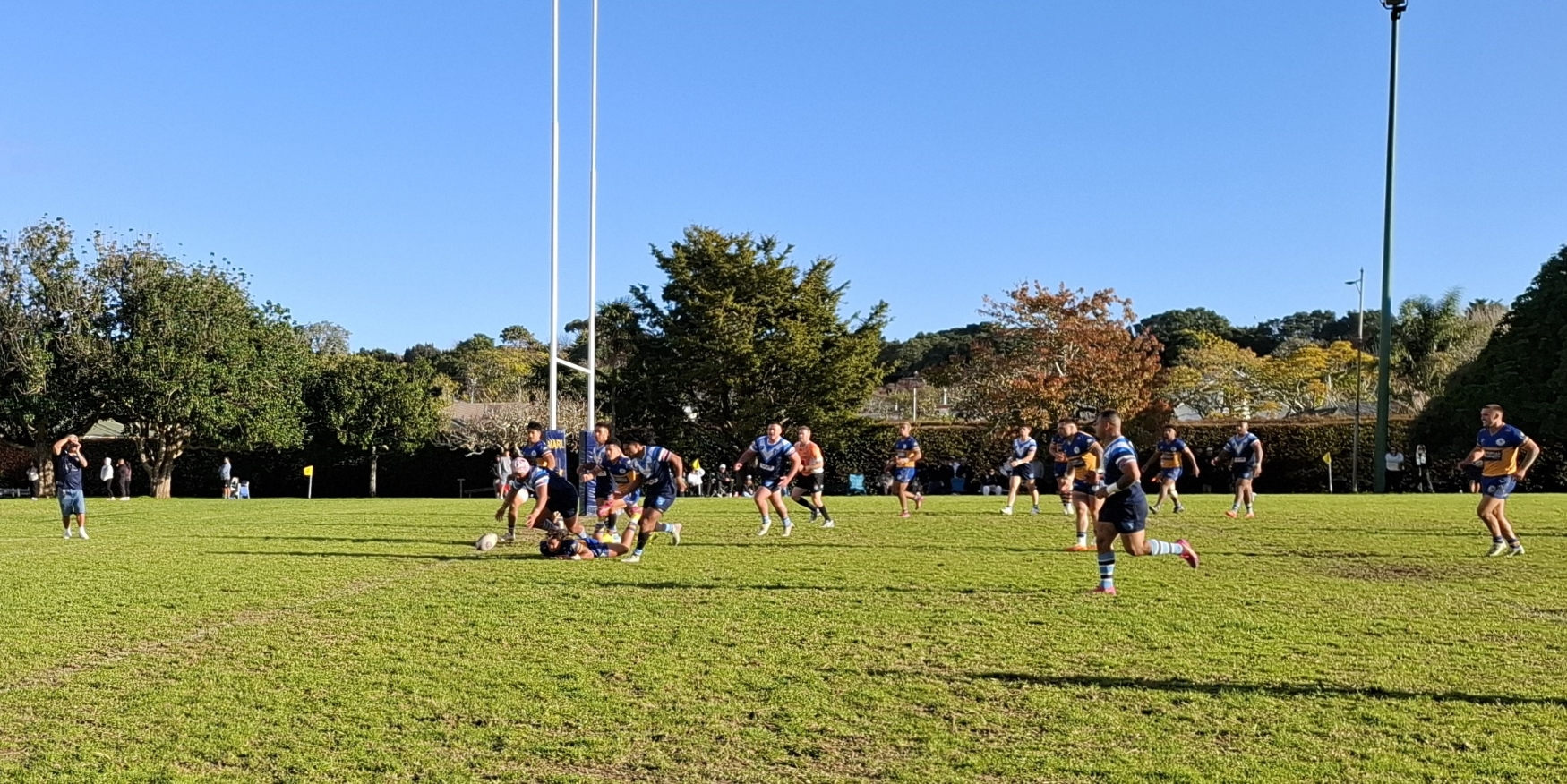
Fine Vakautakakala scoring a try to give Otahuhu a 10-8 lead.

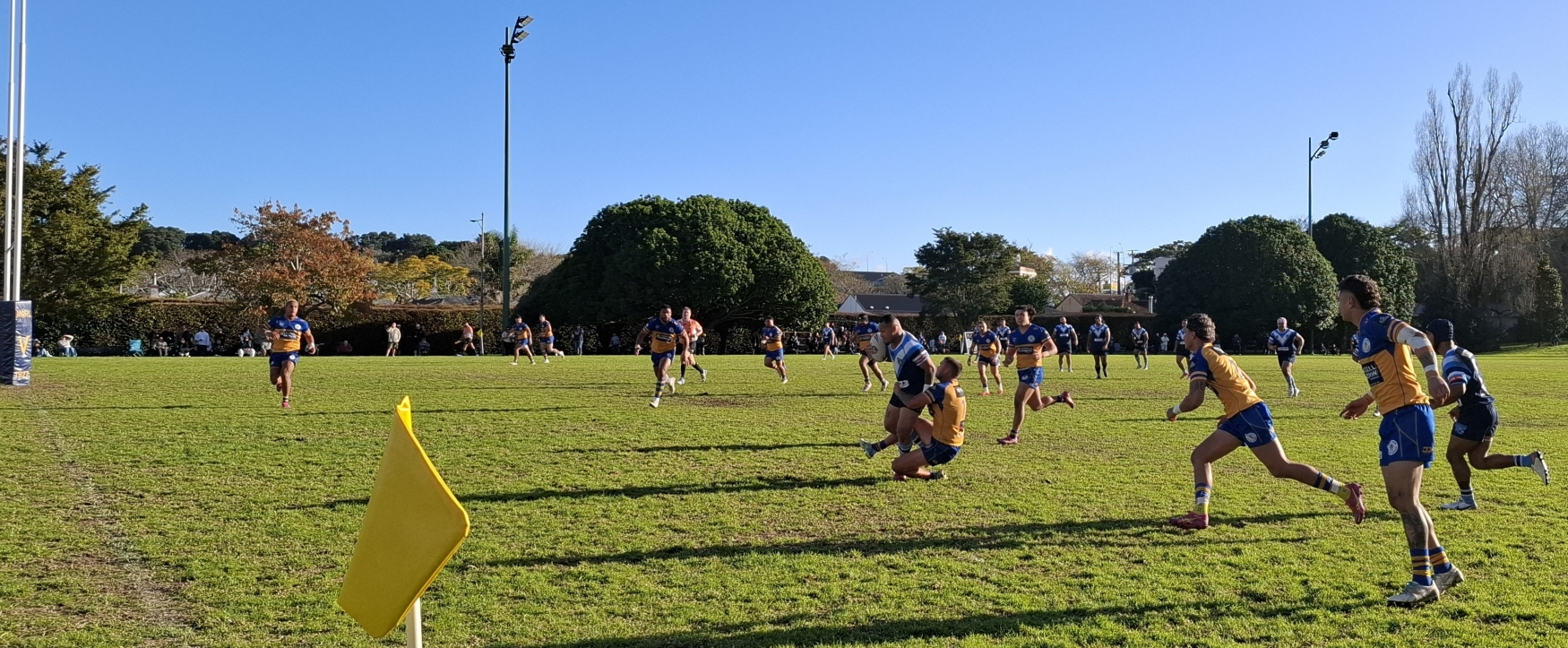
Viliami Kuli, the Otahuhu centre on attack in the second half.

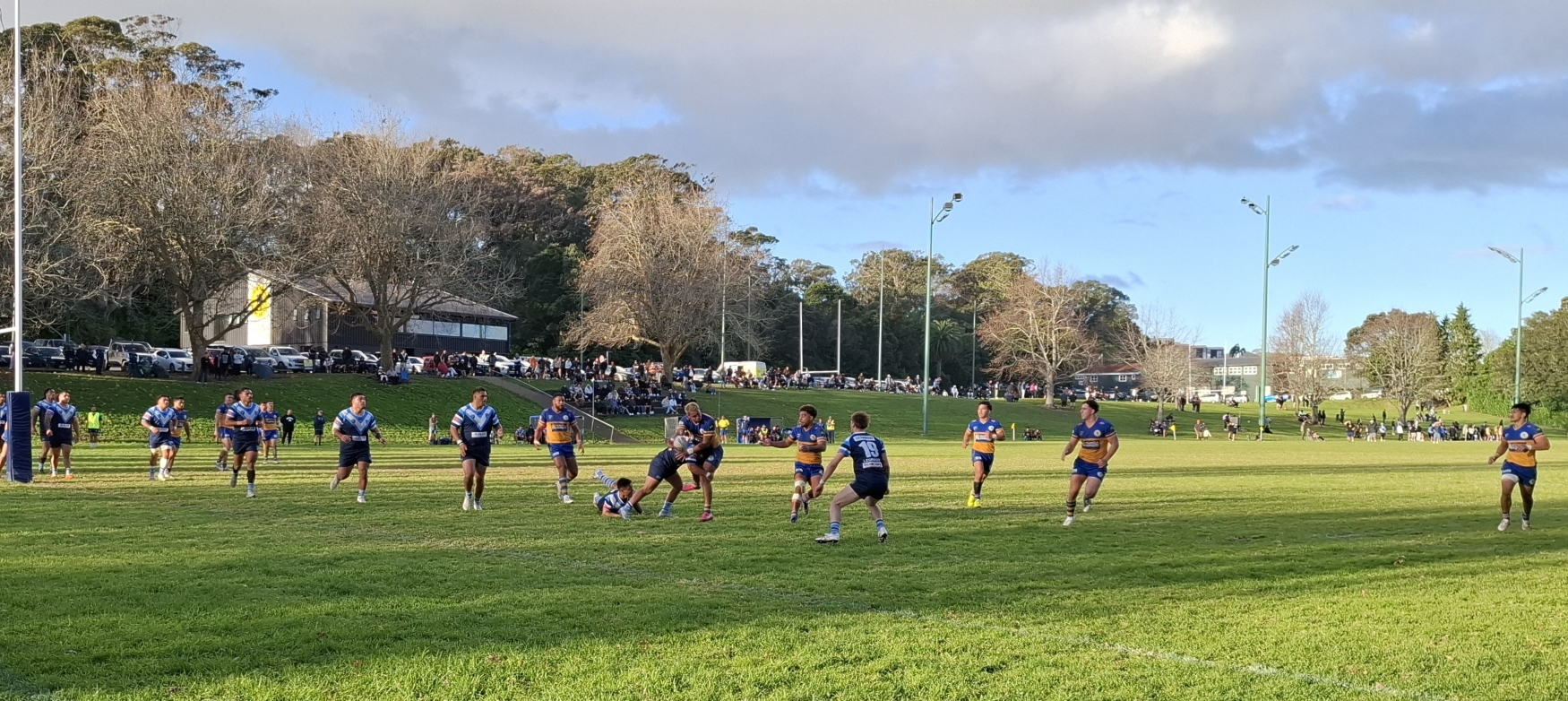
Dion Fraser about to receive the ball and score a consolation try for Mt Albert.

In the live streamed game Te Atatu suffered their 5th consecutive loss with Bay Roskill moving ahead of them on the points table through a six tries to three effort. Amanaki Veamatahau and Lawrence Mamia both scored doubles. After three consecutive losses Richmond came up against Ponsonby who had not won since round 1. Richmond scored nine tries and ran away with the game in the second half after it had been 20-16 at halftime. Mike Williams scored a double against his former team while Caleb Savelio-Thompson and Oscar Su'a also crossed twice each. For Ponsonby Max Riechelmann scored at either end of the game. The top of the table clash between Mount Albert and Otahuhu at Fowlds Park was closely fought. A penalty goal by Navajo Doyle gave the Lions an 8-6 half time lead. Midway through the second half Otahuhu took the lead through a grubber kick by Fine Vakautakakala which he fell on over the line. The Leopards continued with their simple game plan of using their size to gain yardage and wear their opponent down though they upped the tempo in the second half. Vakautakakala scored twice as did Jamel Hunt and his brother, Phoenix Hunt also crossed for a try. The win gave the Otahuhu side the Roope Rooster trophy for the first time since 2010 and was the third time it had changed hands so far this season. Marist's co-captain, Sunia Akau'ola brought up his 100th game for Marist in their match with Papakura at Murray Halberg Park. Papakura was in control of the game at halftime 18-6 and held off the Saints on the back of two tries to Walter Fifita, and one each to Stedman Lefau, Siave Togoiu and Viliami Lolohea. Manukau continued their promising season with a come from 22-14 behind midway through the second half. They scored tries to Fred Muller, Kahn Munokoa, and Paea Fotu to take the win with Muller kicking five goals.

21 June	Te Atatu	16-30 (6-20)	Bay Roskill	Jack Colvin Park 1, Te Atatu
2:30	Try: Clive Tu'ifua (16m), Sunia Hala (54m), Lucas Adams (71m); Con: Lucas Adams 2/3 (17m, 55m)		Try: Amanaki Veamatahau 2 (2m, 26m), Lawrence Mamia 2 (34m, 68m), Renouf Oge (38m), Silas Toala (80m); Con: Joshua Tanielu 2/5 (28m, 80m), Ben Henry 1/1 (39m)	Attendance: 150; Referee: Nigel Williams, TJ's: Paul Lorigan and Kemo Teariki

21 June	Ponsonby	20-44 (16-20)	Richmond	Victoria Park 1, Central City
2:30	Try: Max Riechelmann 2 (9m, 79m), Felise Tau (32m), Li Taufoou (35m); Con: Molisoni Faiva 2 (33m, 36m)		Try: Mike Williams 2 (1m, 54m), Unknown (13m), Caleb Savelio-Thompson 2 (21m, 47m), Oscar Su'a 2 (27m, 73m), Waikare Ratima (61m), Darius Niumata (65m); Con: Hawaiiki Annandale 2 (14m, 22m), Darius Niumata 2 (48m, 55m)	Referee: David Millar, TJ's: Leigh Fletcher and Oliver Broadhead

21 June	Mount Albert	12-28 (8-6)	Otahuhu	Fowlds Park 1, Morningside
2:30	Try: Tommy Beale (29m), Dion Fraser (80m); Con: Navajo Doyle (30m); Pen: Navajo Doyle (40m)		Try: Jamel Hunt 2 (14m, 64m), Fine Vakautakakala (52m, 58m), Phoenix Hunt (70m); Con: Bostyn Hakaraia 1/1 (16m), William Fakatoumafi 3/4 (54m, 65m, 71m)	Attendance: 350; Referee: Anthony Eliott, TJ's: Jordan Chand and Corey Jull

21 June	Marist	16-26 (6-18)	Papakura	Murray Halberg Park 1, Mt Albert
2:30	Try: Montell Matamu Tuese (20m), Jahvaan Manukau Powell (61m), Afe Akau'ola (74m); Con: Doux Kauhiva 2 (22m, 74m)		Try: Stedman Lefau (23m), Walter Fifita 2 (26m, 51m), Siave Togoiu (32m), Viliami Lolohea (68m); Con: James Dowie (22m, 28m, 33m)	Referee: Brent Newton, TJ's: Hemana Ryan and Kone Lavea

21 June	Manukau	30-22 (14-10)	Point Chevalier	Moyle Park 1, Māngere
2:30	Try: Daley Cassin (13m), Sisi Toutai (21m), Fred Muller (67m), Kahn Munokoa (71m), Paea Fotu (75m); Con: Fred Muller 4/5 (15m, 22m, 69m, 73m); Pen: Fred Muller 1/1 (32m)		Try: Juelz Baker (8m), Callum Jones (36m), Noah Jensen (55m), Jackson Kite (60m); Con: James Marriott (9m), Etuate Fukofuka 2 (56m, 61m)	Referee: Keven Ah-Ken, TJ's: Maxine Godinet and James Priest

===== Round 8 =====
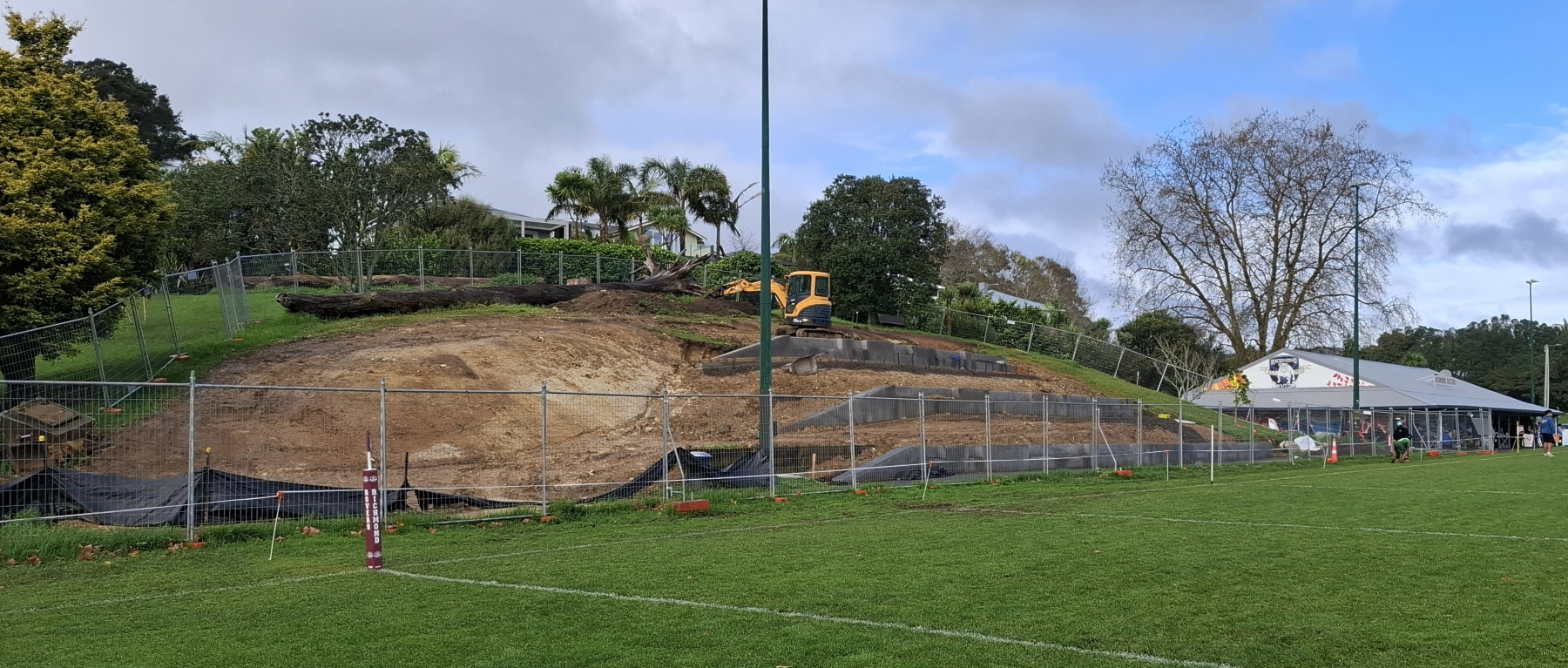
The renewal of the spectator area at Grey Lynn Park (June 28, 2025).

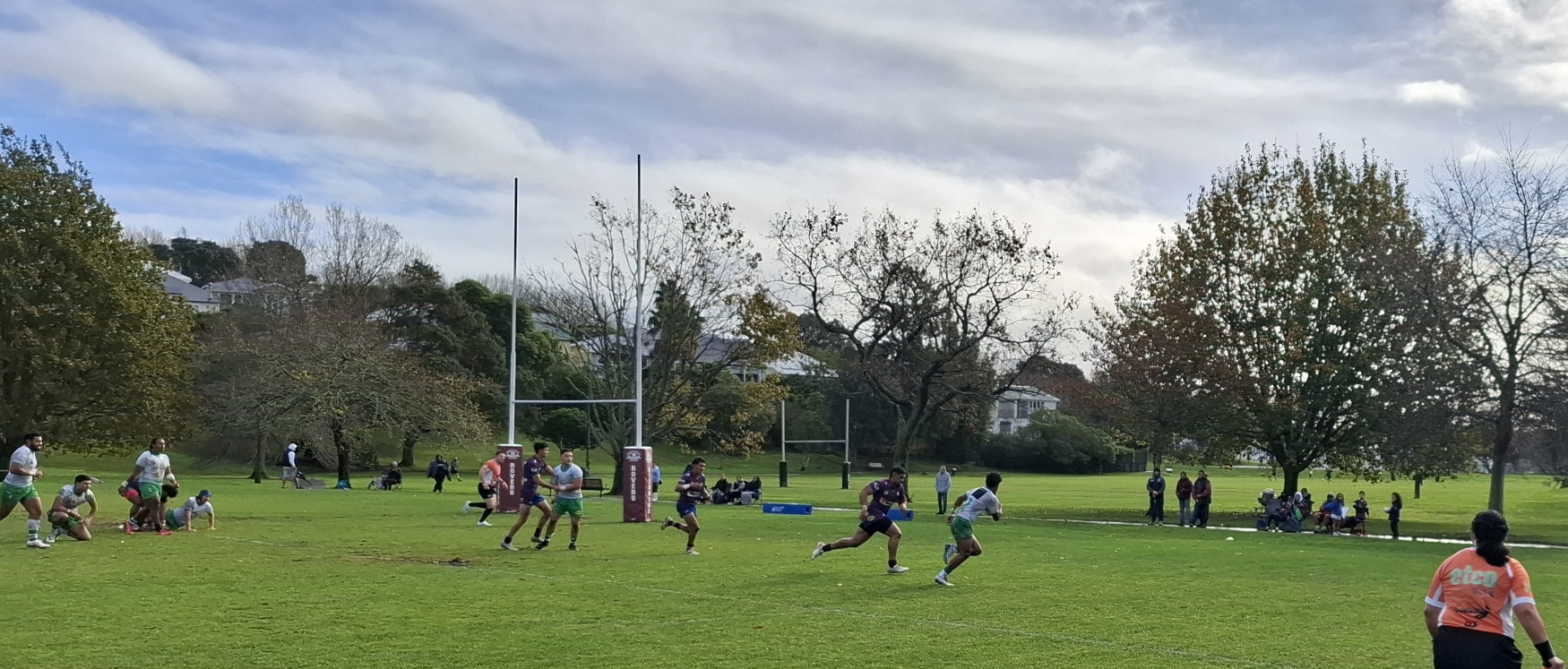
Malakai Cama (Pt Chevalier) scoring after the Richmond fullback let a kick bounce and the chasing Pirates secured the ball and shifted to the right.

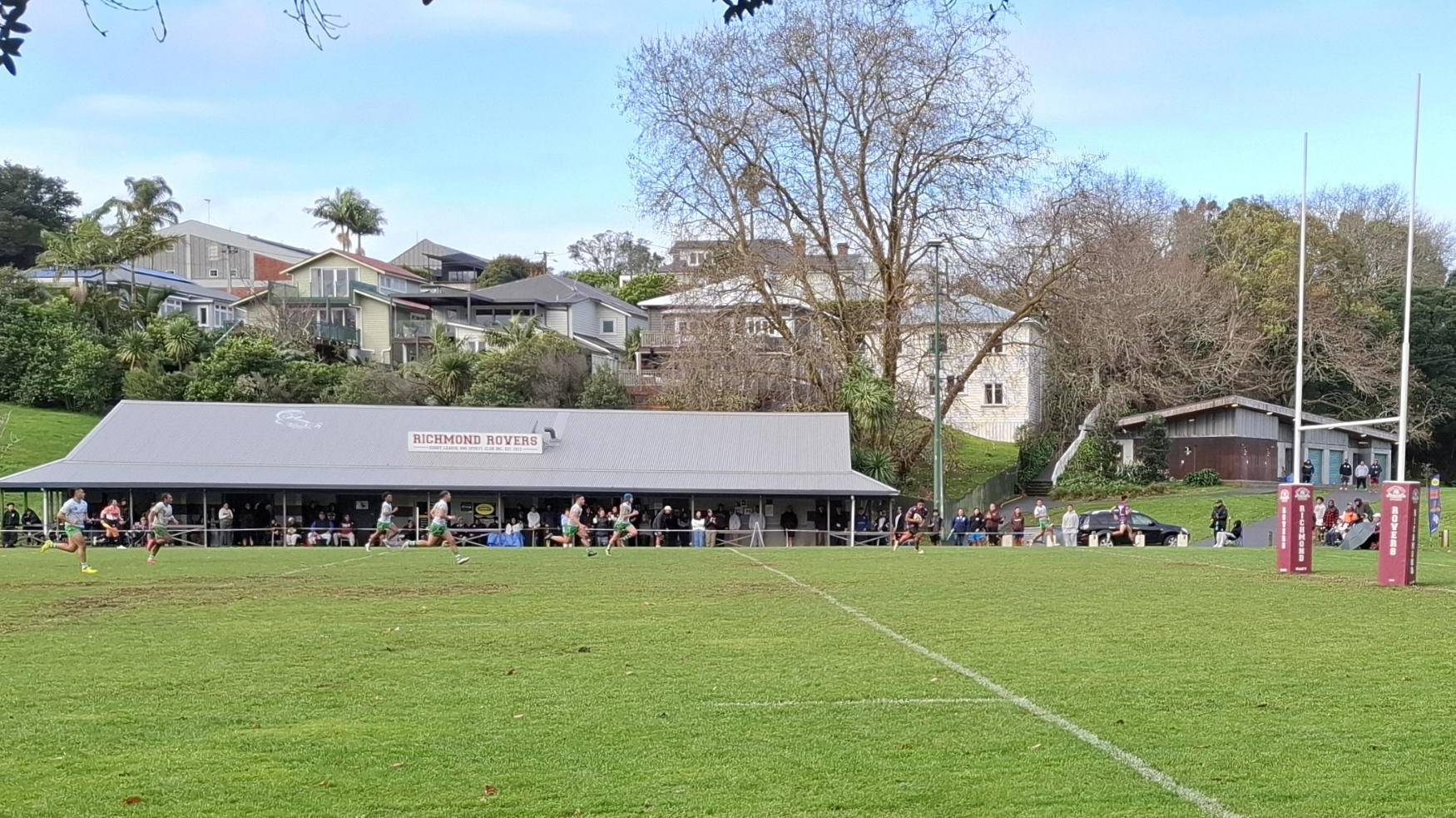
Trujon Nomani-Brown (Richmond) scoring after Kaylis Lundon charged down a kick and threw the ball infield to his support.

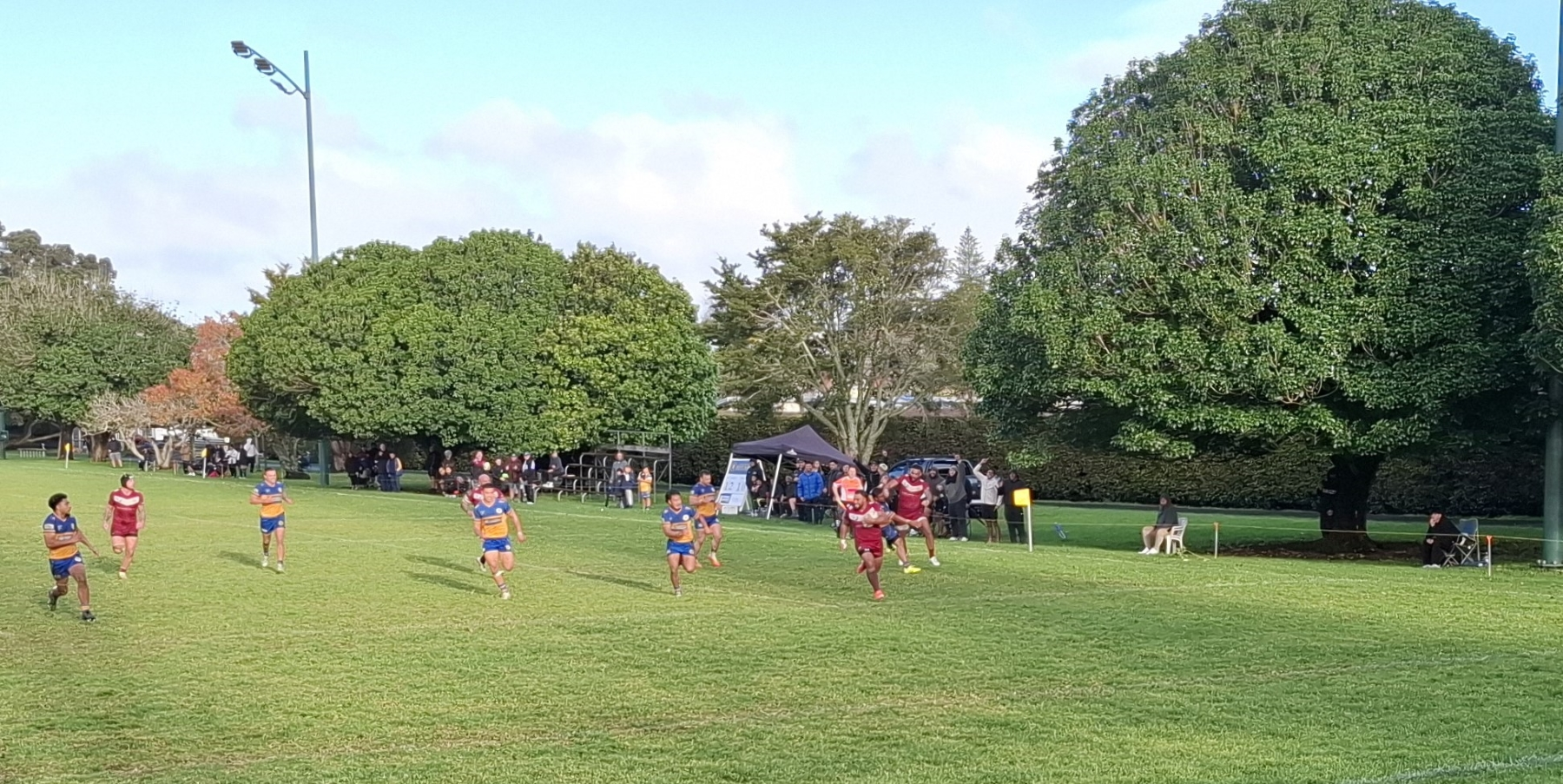
Siave Togoiu's try that was ruled out after Walter Fifita forearmed Jeremiah Poutu in backplay leading to Fifita's sin binning and Poutu leaving the field.

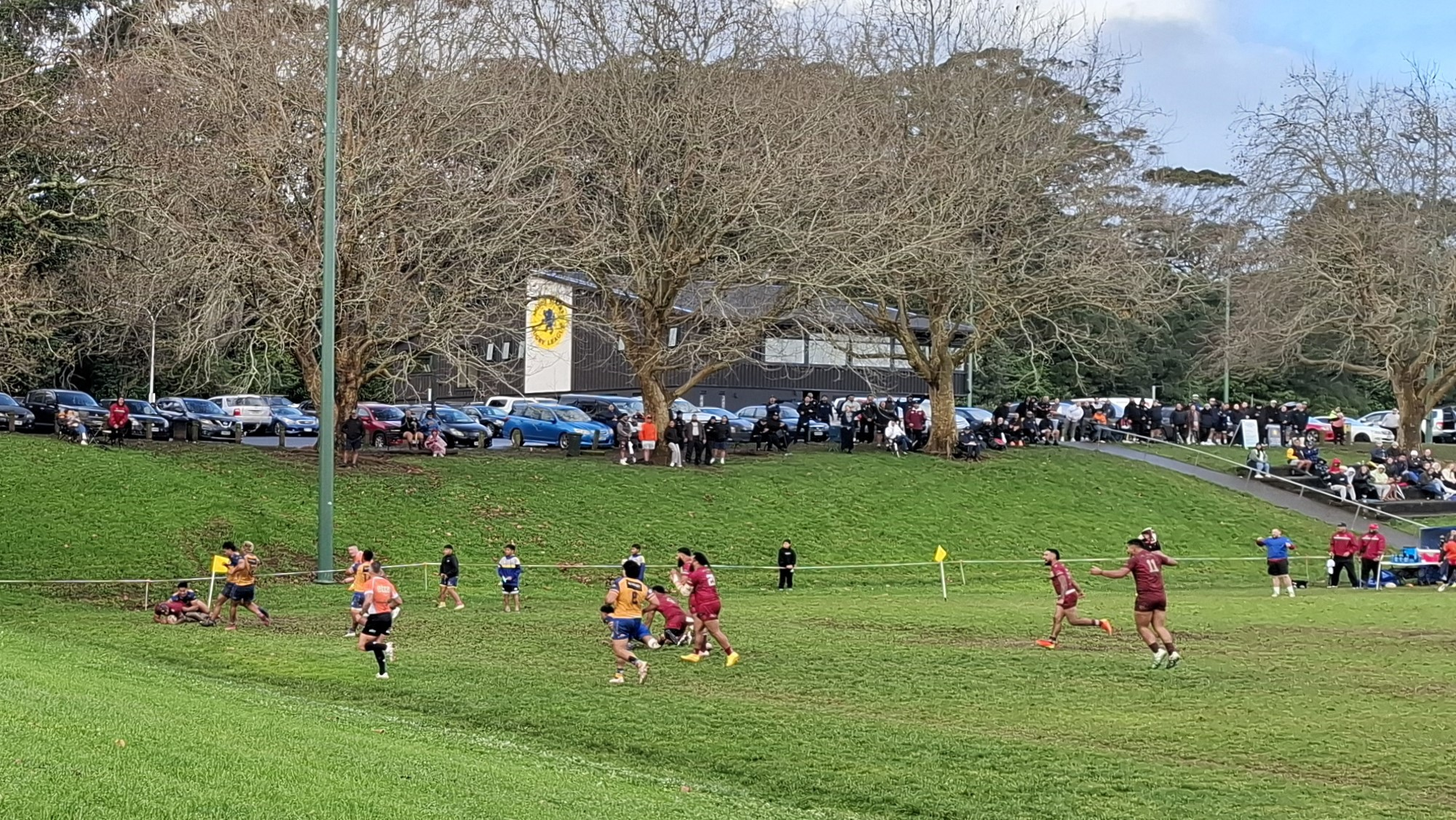
Jamie Henry, former Japanese rugby international scoring for Papakura.

The games were played in a mixture of showers and sunshine following a wet few days across Auckland. All the suburban fields were soft but in otherwise good condition. At Grey Lynn Park the visiting Pt Chevalier side prevailed in a seesaw battle with the lead changing hands four times. Pt Chevalier took an early lead after Richmond let a kick bounce and Pt Chevalier regained the ball and shifted to the right for Malakai Cama to cross easily. Later in the half Kaylis Lundon charged down a kick and threw a pass infield to the supporting Trujon Nomani-Brown who picked up the bouncing ball to score. At halftime Pt Chevalier led 16-12 but Richmond scored three converted tries to take a 28-20 lead. The Pirates finished the strongest with Blade Collins-Kamuhemu who was playing his former side dummying out of dummy half and forcing his way over with the conversion narrowing the deficit to two before a 76th minute penalty by Caleb Laiman tied the scores. He then crossed for the match winner three minutes later. At Bert Henham Park the Otahuhu side ran away with another heavy victory, 72-6 over Te Atatu. Viliami Kuli had a hat trick in 30 minutes and Toaiti Ramsay also went in for three tries while Dylan Tavita and Andrew Nansen scored doubles. William Fakatoumafi added 20 to his season tally of points with a try and 8 conversions. Te Atatu's lone points came from a try to Semisini Lopeti converted by Lucas Adams which had made the scores 6-6 through 12 minutes before the Leopards completely took over. The win also meant that Otahuhu defended the Roope Rooster for the first time after taking it off Mt Albert the previous week. Their opponents, Te Atatu had been the side which began the season with it in their possession. Papakura led 10-8 after 25 minutes following tries to Walter Fifita and Stedman Lefau at Fowlds Park however the Mt Albert side responded with a try to Tommy Beale before halftime and John Aitu in the 55th minute to take the lead. With twenty minutes to go Papakura broke away on the left edge and with Siave Togoiu going in to score Fifita threw a forearm at Jeremiah Poutu in the back play and the try was ruled out with Fifita being sent to the sin bin. Poutu was helped from the field after the incident. The game then swung further Mt Abert's way with Phoenix Sorensen scoring after a break down the left sideline before they swung the ball across the field for Sorensen to exploit the stretched defense. Papakura right winger Jamie Henry replied with a late try but James Dowie's conversion to tie the scores fell short hitting the padding of the left upright. Henry was on debut for his new side and had been playing rugby union in Japan since 2013 and had represented Japan in Sevens and one full international in 2018 against the All Blacks as well as playing for Toyota Verblitz (2017-21), Kamaishi Seawaves (2022-25), and the Sunwolves in 2019. Mt Albert then sealed victory on full time with Marcus Fraser diving over from dummy half. Kahil Johnson converted three of their four tries. At Moyle Park, Manukau won their third game in a row to solidify 4th place. Samuel Nati opened the scoring after dummying and bouncing out of a tackle and scoring under the posts. His second came just before halftime in almost identical fashion. Fred (Leti) Muller finished the scoring with a swerving run which he converted to have 5 from 5 for the afternoon. Timor Williams was the sole scorer for Ponsonby who remain at the bottom of the table on points differential from Te Atatu.

28 June	Richmond	28-34 (12-16)	Pt Chevalier	Grey Lynn Park 2, Grey Lynn
2:30	Try: Trujon Nomani-Brown (26m), Kaylis Lundon (39m), Sione Ngahe (41m), Oscar Su'a (55m), Caleb Savelio-Thompson (59m); Con: Waikare Ratima (27m), Trujon Nomani-Brown 3 (40m, 42m, 60m)		Try: Malakai Cama (7m), Juelz Baker (14m), Callum Jones (33m), Taipari Wikitera (51m), Matagi-Blade Collins-Kamuhemu (67m), Mikaele Ilaiu (79m); Con: James Marriot 3 (16m, 35m, 67m), Caleb Laiman (80m); Pen: Caleb Laiman (76m)	Attendance: 150; Referee: Chris McMillan, TJ's: Nigel Williams and Maxine Godinet

28 June	Otahuhu	72-6 (34-6)	Te Atatu	Bert Henham Park 1, Ōtāhuhu
2:30	Try: Viliami Kuli 3 (5m, 28m, 30m), Dylan Tavita 2 (15m, 79m), Toaiti Ramsay 3 (24m, 66m, 76m), Bostyn Hakaraia (36m), William Fakatoumafi (39m), Andrew Nansen 2 (45m, 69m), Connor Taurua Purcell (48m), Sione Tonga Paea Nau (73m); Con: William Fakatoumafi 8/14 (7m, 16m, 29m, 49m, 66m, 70m, 74m, 80m)		Try: Semisini Lopeti (9m); Con: Lucas Adams 1/1 (11m)	Referee: Keven Ah-Ken, TJ's: Rebecca Ellison and Michael Une

28 June	Mt Albert	22-14 (6-10)	Papakura	Fowlds Park 1, Morningside
2:30	Try: Tommy Beale (34m), John Aitu (55m), Phoenix Sorensen (65m), Marcus Fraser (79m); Con: Kahil Johnson 3/4 (35m, 56m, 80m)		Try: Walter Fifita (4m), Stedman Lefau (23m), Jamie Henry (75m); Con: James Dowie 1/3 (25m)	Attendance: 200; Referee: Paki Parkinson, TJ's: Ryan Doherty and Corey Jull

28 June	Manukau	30-4 (18-0)	Ponsonby	Moyle Park 1, Māngere
2:30	Try: Samuel Nati 2 (18m, 40m), Taunga Arama (27m), Kahn Munokoa (62m), Fred Muller (69m); Con: Fred Muller 5/5 (19m, 28m, 40m, 63m, 70m)		Try: Timor Williams (51m)	Referee: Daniel Caddy, TJ's: Kone Lavea and TBC

28 June	Bay Roskill	14-12 (14-12)	Marist	Blockhouse Bay Reserve 4, Blockhouse Bay
2:30	Try: Renouf Oge (11m), Cheoneth Henry (18m); Con: Joshua Tanielu 2/2 (13m, 19m); Pen: Joshua Tanielu (40m)		Try: Draven Sao (22m), Doux Kauhiva (30m); Con: Doux Kauhiva 2/2 (24m, 31m)	Referee: Anthony Eliott, TJ's: Leigh Fletcher and Paul Lorigan

===== Round 9 =====
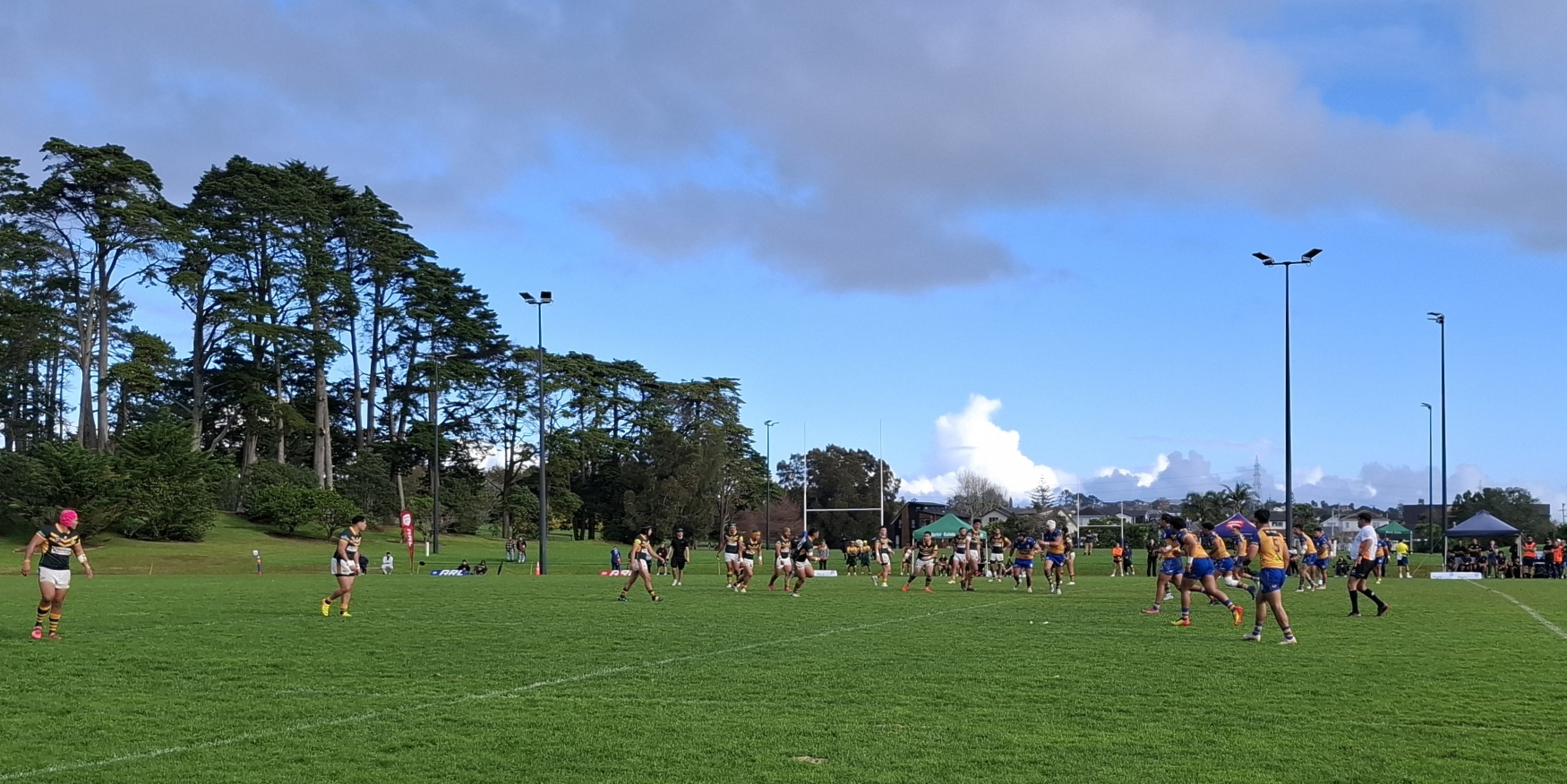
Marist v Mt Albert at Margaret Griffen Park in Mt Roskill.

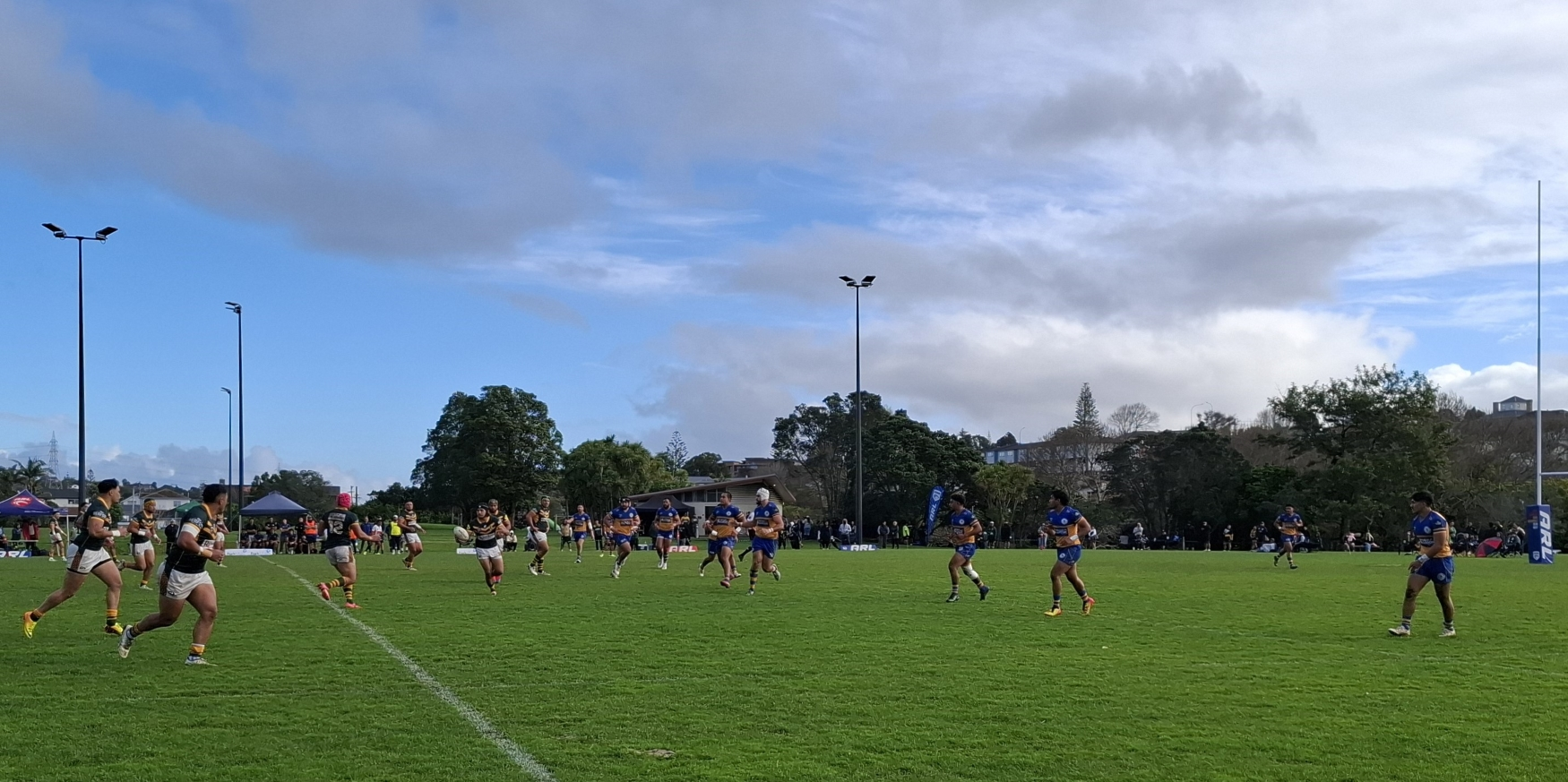
Doux Kauhiva passing for Marist shortly before they opened the scoring.

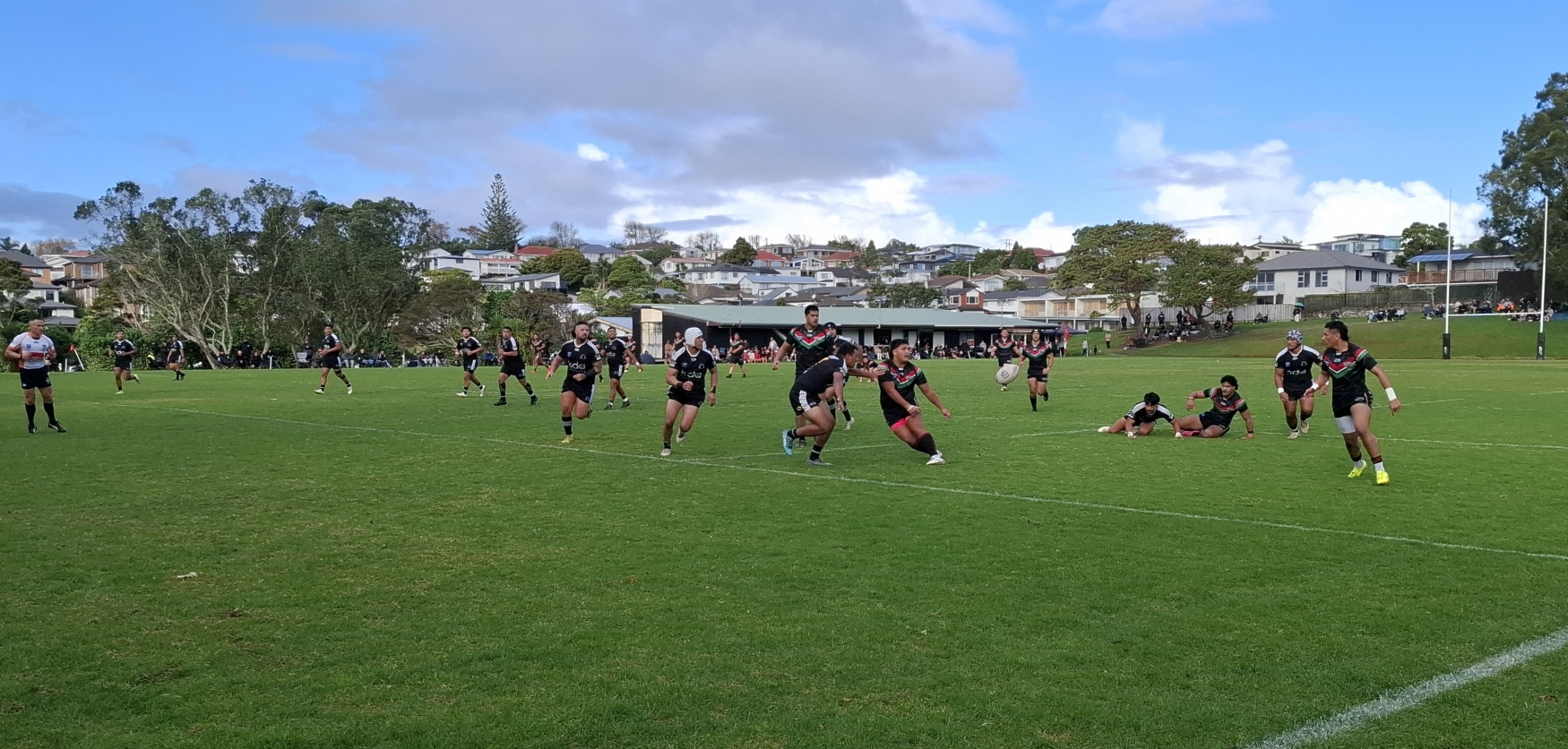
Sebastian Hindt passing for Bay Roskill v Manukau.

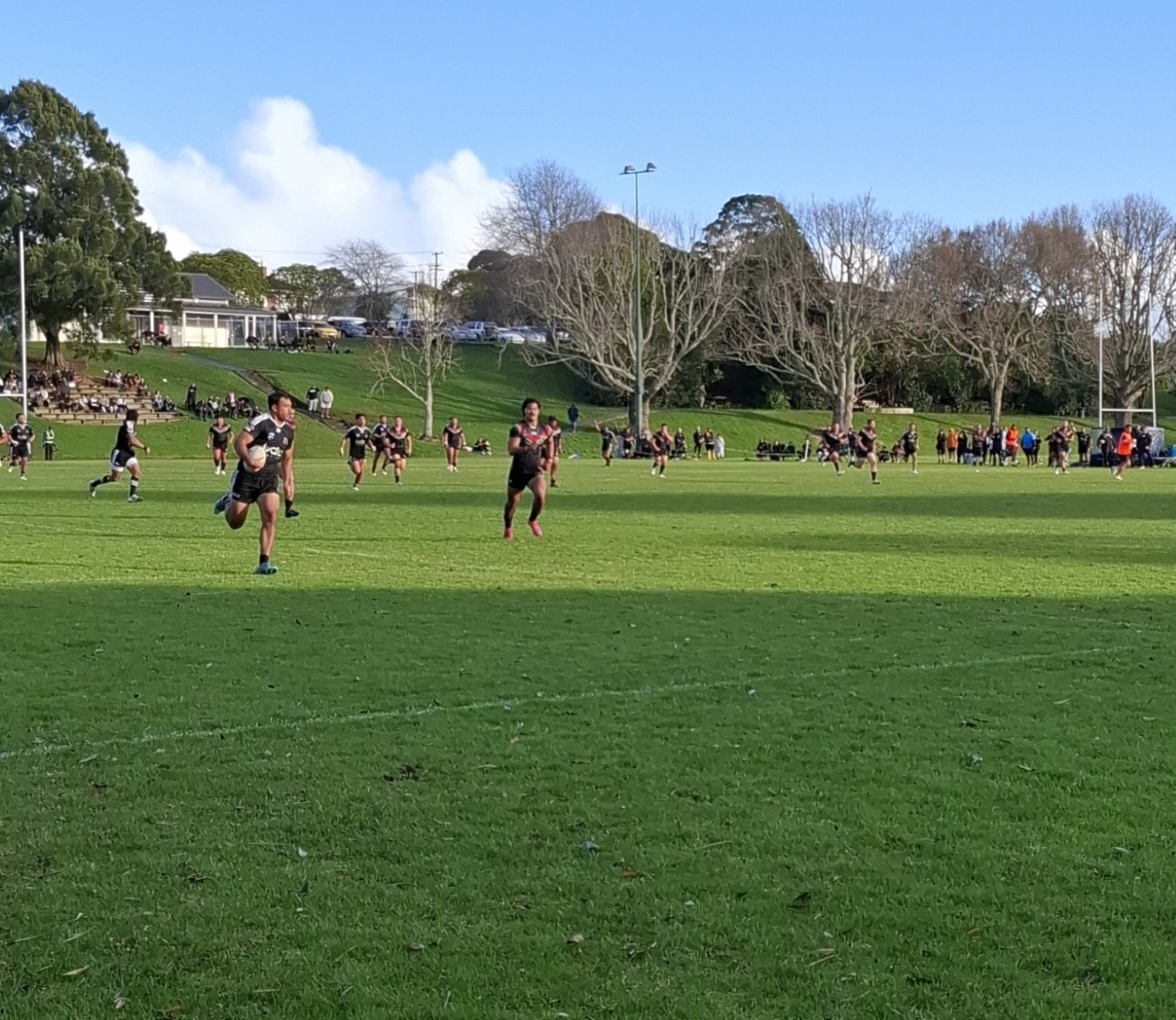
Kahn Munokoa after picking up a loose ball and running 70m to give Manukau a 20-6 lead.

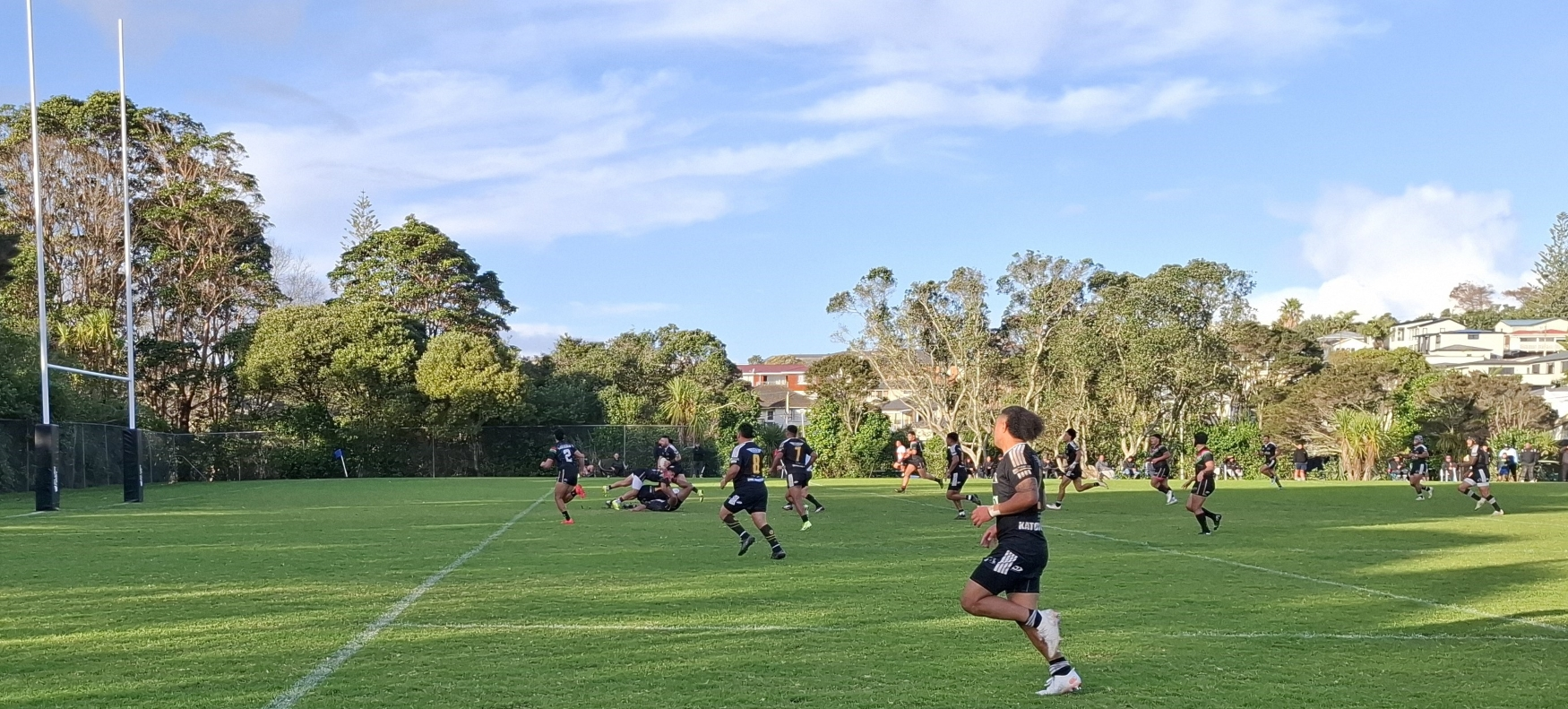
Karekake Holamotu about to score for Manukau after Samuel Nati broke through, passed to Akuila Taha who fed Holamotu.

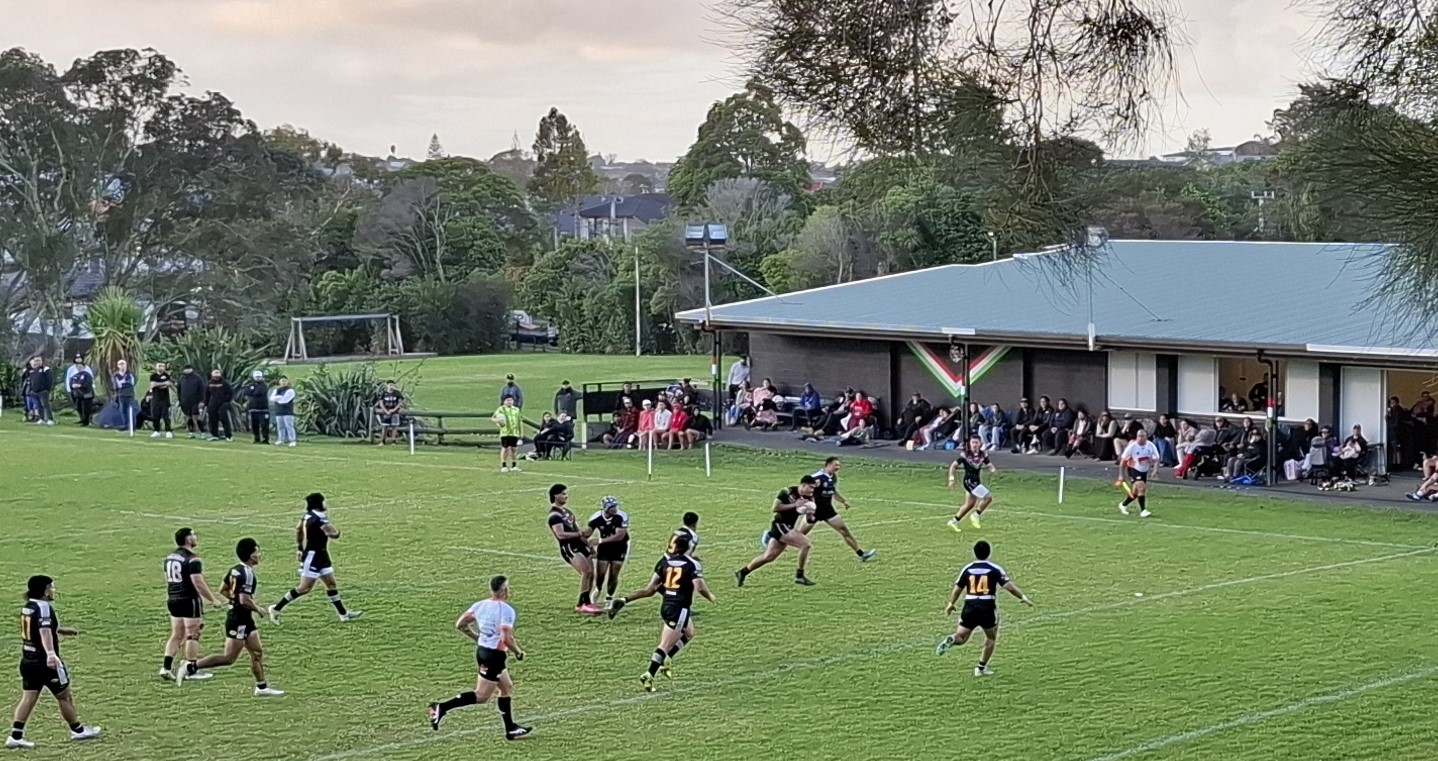
Zion Tanielu about to score after taking a pass from his brother, Joshua.

Manukau had a 30-10 win over Bay Roskill after taking a 16-0 lead at halftime. The Vikings threatened to make a game of it when Mackenzie Kata scored in the 44th minute and Joshua Tanielu converted but from the next set Tanielu tried to tap on a pass which went to ground and winger Kahn Munokoa picked up the loose ball and raced 70 metres to score. A penalty to Leti Muller and a try to Karekake Holamotu gave them an unassailable lead. At Jack Colvin Park an improving Richmond side ran in four first half tries for a 22-0 lead before Te Atatu scored their only points just after halftime with a try to Kane Lefleur. However the Bulldogs scored four more tries with Trujon Nomani-Brown finishing with seven conversions. The game between Marist and Mt Albert was transferred to Marist's second home ground, Margaret Griffen Park due to the recent wet weather. The ground was in very good condition for the live streamed game. The Saints scored twice early to take a 10-0 lead. Their first try came after Jeremiah Poutu fielded a kick but threw a wild pass infield that went to ground for Laurence McFall to eventually gather and dive over. Mt Albert replied with a brilliant piece of work from Kalepo Paualaisa which gave AJ Ulugia space to beat the remaining defence. Poutu then made a long run down the right edge before the Lions swung it to the left for Paualaisa crossed in the left corner. Paualaisa put Ulugia away down the left side who passed back to Dion Fraser in support to cap an 80 metre effort and then Poutu bumped off a defender to make the halftime score 22-10. Kahil Johnson scored for Mt Albert early in the second half when Marist dropped a bomb, before Lani Graham Taufa, the twin brother of Moala Graham-Taufa crashed over to make the score 28-14. Navajo Doyle scored a 65th minute try to go with five conversions. Paualaisa capped off an excellent attacking performance winning the race to a short grubber from Fraser close to full time. At Prince Edward Park, Papakura opened the scoring with a try to Walter Fifita before Malakai Cama, Taipari Wikitera, and Juelz Baker crossed for tries to put the Pirates in front 20-16 at the break. Stedman Lefau scored twice for the Sea Eagles while Fifita added a second in the 72nd minute. James Dowie converted five of their six tries while Tyrone Hurt-Pickering only converted two of the Pirates five tries with Juelz Baker scoring a double. At Victoria Park the Ponsonby side found themselves level with Otahuhu 8-8 after half an hour after Mitchuel Elima ripped the ball off Emeliano Mikaele and dived over with Charles Gabriel's conversion and penalty soon after. However the Leopards were ultimately too strong with Toaiti Ramsay scoring two tries as did Tevita Mikaele, while Ben Wharton-Benedict scored a try in his 100th appearance for Otahuhu. Bostyn Hakaraia converted seven of their ten tries.

5 July	Bay Roskill	10-30 (0-16)	Manukau	Blockhouse Bay Reserve 4, Blockhouse Bay
2:30	Try: Mackenzie Kata (44m), Zion Tanielu (76m); Con: Joshua Tanielu (46m)		Try: Yijo John (2m), Akuila Tuha (13m), Leti Muller (27m), Kahn Munokoa (47m), Karekake Holamotu (61m); Con: Leti Muller 4/5 (7m, 15m, 53m, 63m); Pen: Leti Muller 1/1 (55m)	Referee: Paki Parkinson, TJ's: Tameilau Pauuvale and Ryan Doherty

5 July	Te Atatu	4-46 (0-22)	Richmond	Jack Colvin Park 1, Te Atatū
2:30	Try: Kane Lefleur (41m)		Try: Unknown (7m), Caleb Savelio-Thompson (15m), Unknown (18m), Unknown (27m), Unknown (44m), Unknown (55m), Unknown 63m), Unknown (66m); Con: Trujon Nomani-Brown 7/8 (17m, 20m, 28m, 46m, 57m, 65m, 67m)	Referee: David Millar, TJ's: Maxine Godinet and Paul Lorigan

5 July	Marist	14-38 (10-22)	Mt Albert	Margaret Griffen Park 2, Mt Roskill
2:30	Try: Laurence McFall (4m), Isileli Ula (16m), Lani Graham-Taifa (51m); Con: Doux Kauhiva 1/3 (12m)		Try: AJ Ulugia (21m), Kalepo Paualaisa 2 (19m, 77m), Dion Fraser (26m), Jeremiah Poutu (28m), Kahil Johnson (45m), Navajo Doyle (65m); Con: Navajo Doyle 5/6 (16m, 27m, 35m, 47m, 78m), Kahil Johnson 0/1	Referee: Daniel Caddy, TJ's: Nigel Williams and Leigh Fletcher

5 July	Papakura	34-24 (16-20)	Pt Chevalier	Prince Edward Park 1, Papakura
2:30	Try: Walter Fifita 2 (5m, 72), Stedman Lefau 2 (18m, 61m), Isileli Matalave (31m), Jarney Proctor (48m), Con: James Dowie 5/6 (19m, 32m, 49m, 62m, 77m)		Try: Malakai Cama (15m), Taipari Wikitera (24m), Juelz Baker 2 (27m, 80m), Caleb Laiman (39m); Con: Tyrone Hurt-Pickering 2/5 (16m, 28m)	Referee: Chris McMillan, TJ's: Corey Jull and Michael Une

5 July	Ponsonby	14-54 (8-20)	Otahuhu	Victoria Park 1, Auckland Central
2:30	Try: Mitchuel Elima (12m), Timor Williams (55m); Con: Charles Gabriel 2/2 (13m, 57m); Pen: Charles Gabriel 1/1 (19m)		Try: Andrew Nansen (6m), Viliami Kuli (22m), Connor Taurua-Purcell (32m), Toaiti Ramsay 2 (36m, 75m), Maryn Murray-Tiava'asu'e (49m), Ben Wharton-Benedict (51m), Tevita Mikaele 2 (59m, 80m), Unknown (70m); Con: Bostyn Hakaraia (33m, 50m, 53m, 57m, 60m, 70m, 80m)	Referee: Brent Newton, TJ's: Curtis Wharekawa and Kemo Teariki

===== Round 10 =====
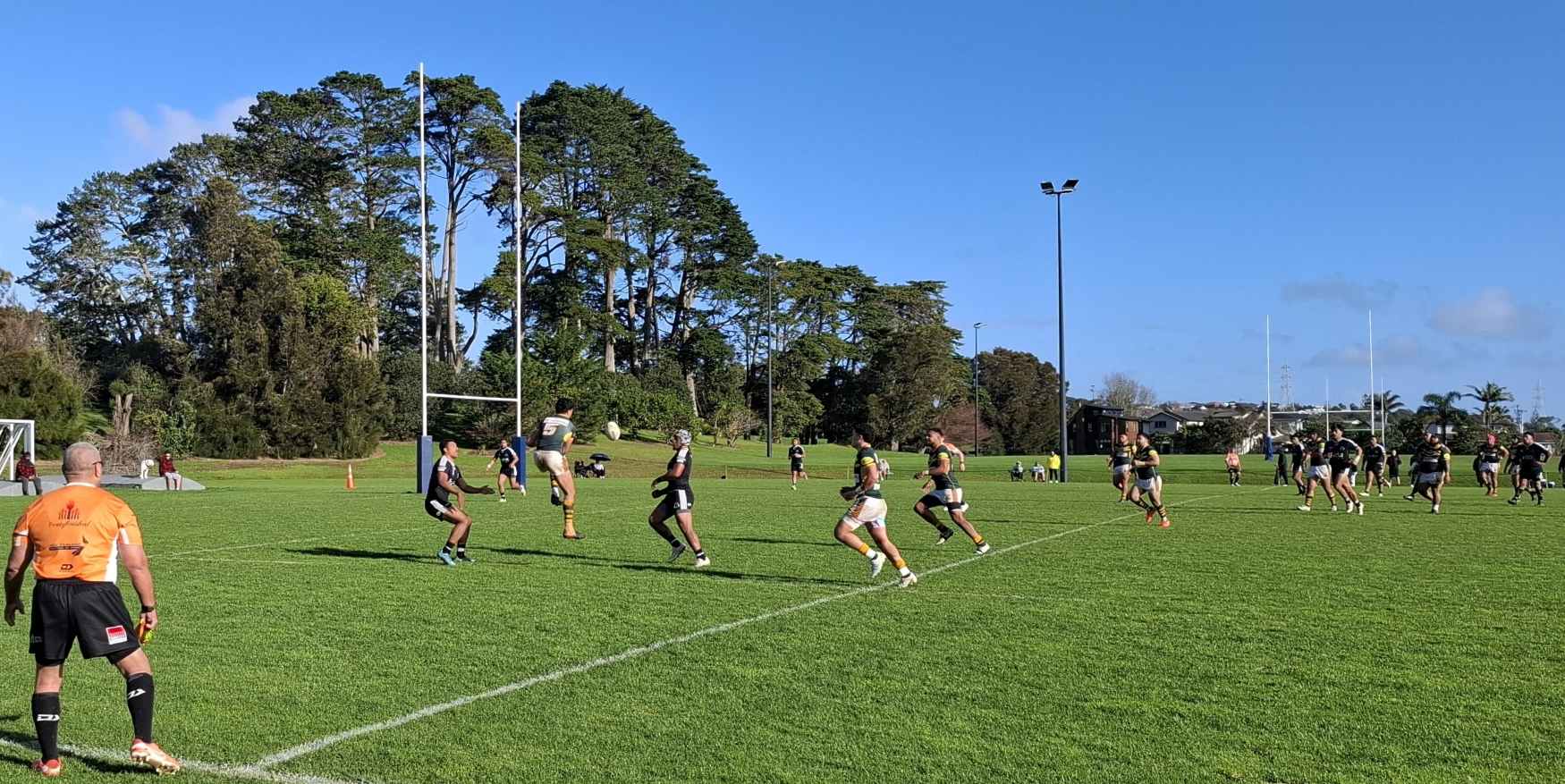
Isileli Ula spilling a kick for Marist v Manukau at Margaret Griffen Park.

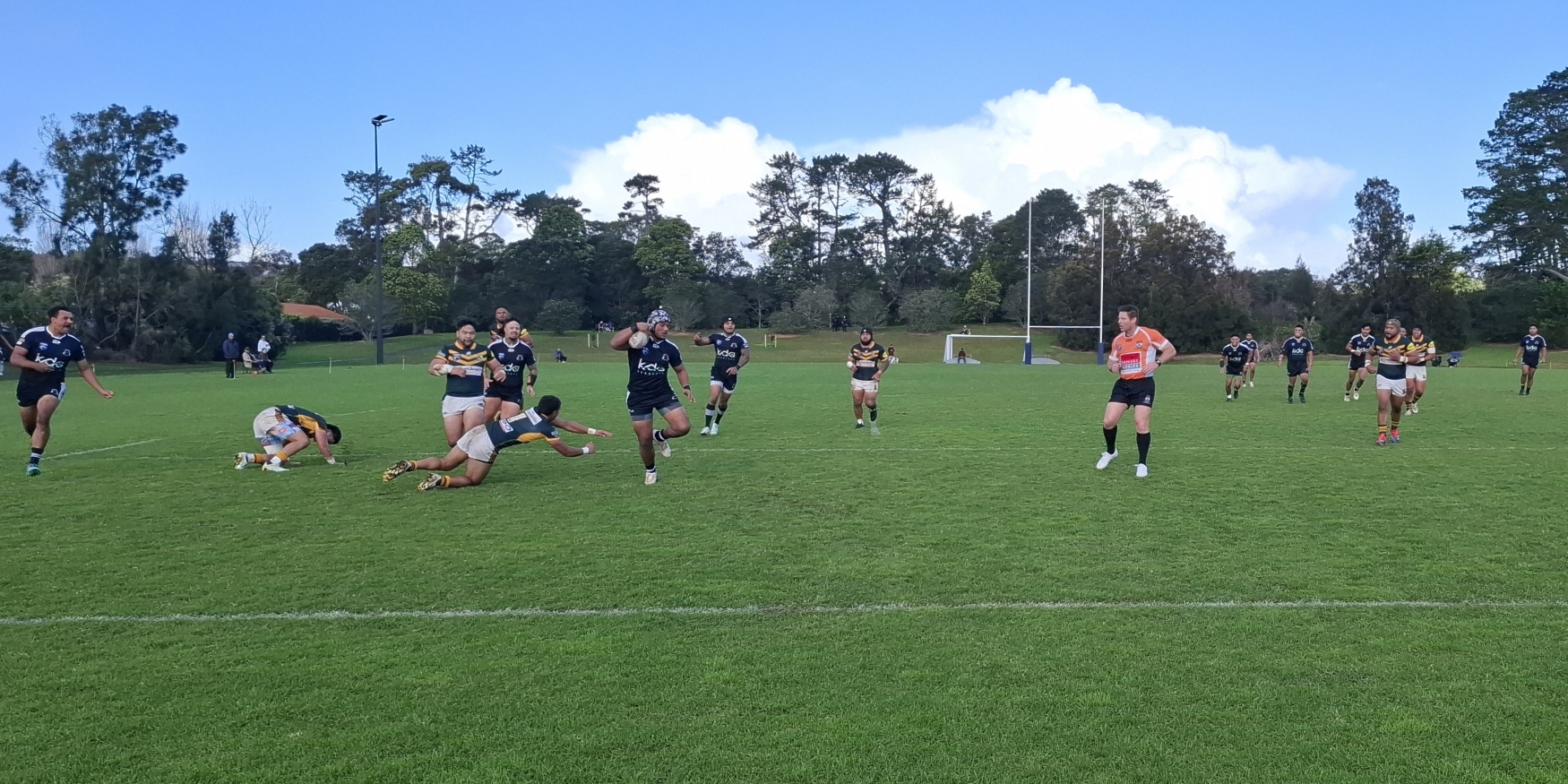
Paea Fotu scoring for Manukau.

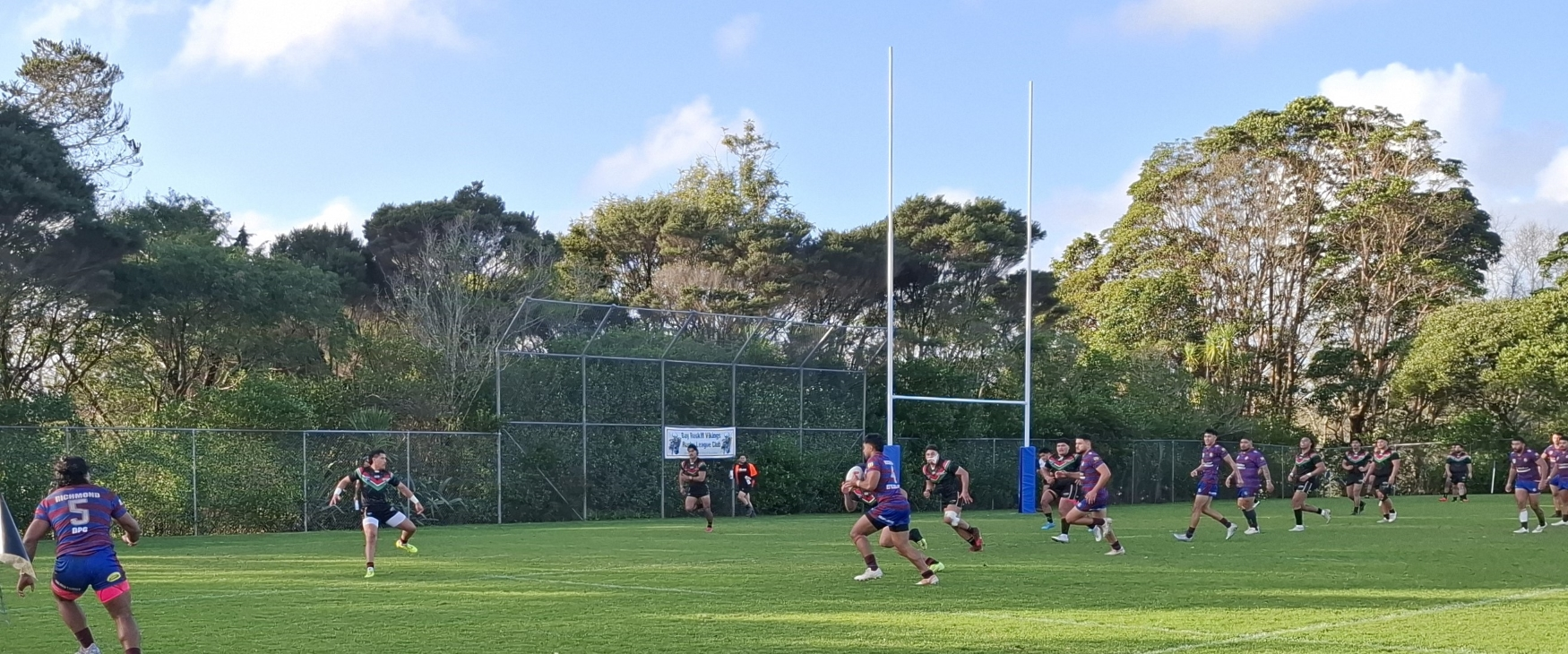
Trujon Nomani-Brown attacking with Mike Williams outside him for Richmond at Blockhouse Bay Reserve.

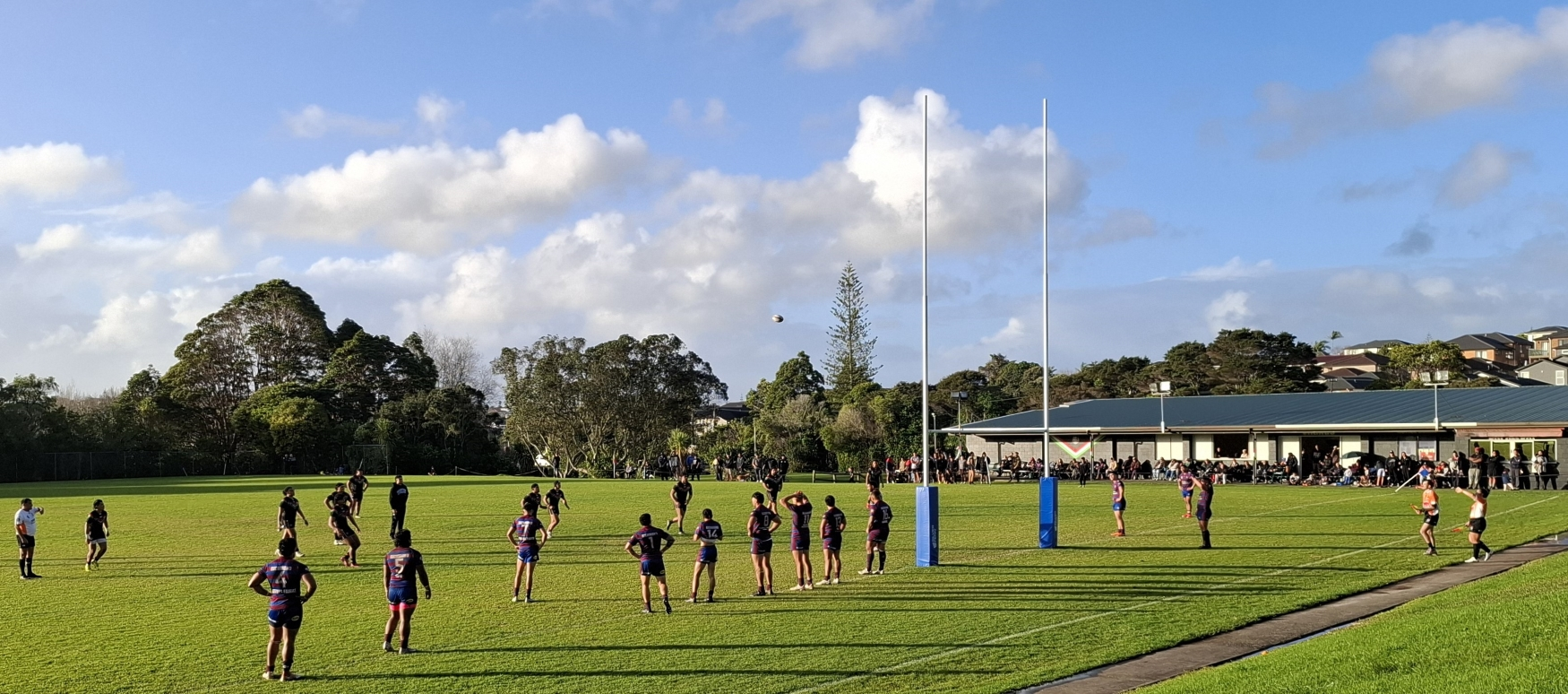
Joshua Tanielu kicking a penalty on fulltime.

Mt Albert solidified their position in second place with a 50-12 win over Ponsonby at Fowlds Park. Big winger, Jeremiah Poutu scored twice, while Navajo Doyle kicked five conversions. With Moyle Park in Māngere unfit due to recent consistent wet weather Manukau's home match against Marist was transferred to Margaret Griffen Park in Mt Roskill. Manukau continued their good form and ran out to a 32-0 halftime lead before adding another 26 points in the second half to a solitary try to Isileli Ula. Paea Fotu scored three tries, while Taunga Arama scored twice and Leti Muller converted seven of their 11 tries. At Blockhouse Bay Reserve, Bay Roskill scored a minor upset coming back from 16-6 down at halftime to win 30-22. Their win was built around towering spiral bombs from fullback Josh Tanielu with the Richmond fullback, Mose Newton either dropping or failing to get a hand on the majority of them. There were three tries which came directly from them in the same play with a noisy home crowd celebrating each of them with the last bomb from Ben Henry with Tanielu lying injured in his own half. Richmond threatened to draw the game when they made the score 28-22 with five minutes to go after a try to Mose Newton but on fulltime Bay Roskill were awarded a penalty following a one on one strip by Henry which Tanielu kicked. At Walker Park, the home Pt Chevalier side led 34-6 at halftime before Te Atatu showed some late fight by keeping the second half score to 16-10 in the Pirates favour who scored ten tries in total. At Bert Henham Park the undefeated Otahuhu team continued their trend of easy wins by beating Papakura who were in third place by 46 to 4. William Falatoumafi scored a try and kicked seven conversions. Standoff Bostyn Hakaraia scored twice for the Leopards with Walter Fifita scoring Papakura's only try.

12 July	Mt Albert	50-12 (22-8)	Ponsonby	Fowlds Park 1, Morningside
2:30	Try: Antonio Ulugia (10m), John Aitu (15m), Jeremiah Poutu 2 (21m, 77m), Solomon Vasuvulagi (33m), Dion Fraser (54m), L'ia Lafaele (75m), Tommy Beale (72m), Kalepo Paualaisa (80m); Con: Navajo Doyle 5 (12m, 16m, 70m, 73m, 78m), Dion Fraser (34m), Thompson Karena (80m)		Try: Tevita Faukafa (28m), Felise Tau (38m), Timor Williams (69m)	Referee: David Millar, TJ's: Nigel Williams and Leigh Fletcher

12 July	Manukau	58-4 (32-0)	Marist	Margaret Griffen Park 2, Mt Roskill
2:30	Try: Samuel Nati (5m), Koronato John (12m), Paea Fotu 3 (17m, 23m, 48m), Theordore Maui (30m), Taunga Arama 2 (35m, 41m), Karekake Holamotu (44m), Desmond To'ofohe (55m), Kahn Munokoa (71m); Con: Leti Muller 7/11 (8m, 18m, 31m, 36m, 42m, 45m, 56m)		Try: Isileli Ula (67m)	Attendance: 100; Referee: Chris McMillan, TJ's: Tameilau Pauuvale and Moses Luke Ripia

12 July	Bay Roskill	30-22 (6-16)	Richmond	Blockhouse Bay Reserve 4, Blockhouse Bay
2:30	Try: Josh Tanielu (16m), Justus Leaoseve (43m), Zacchaeus Cordtz (58m), Vinny Vogel (67m), Renouf Oge (71m); Con: Josh Tanielu 2/3 (17m, 45m), Ben Henry 2/2 (68m, 72m); Pen: Josh Tanielu (80m)		Try: Mike Williams 2 (19m, 29m), Seiuliali'i Harrison Sutton (26m), Mose Newton (75m); Con: Trujon Nomani-Brown 3/4 (26m, 30m, 76m)	Attendance: 200; Referee: Daniel Caddy, TJ's: Maxine Godinet and Oliver Broadhead

12 July	Pt Chevalier	50-16 (34-6)	Te Atatu	Walker Park 2, Pt Chevalier
2:30	Try: Malakai Cama (3m), Jovilisi Jake Sloan 2 (13m, 57m), Unknown (24m), Tyrone Hurt-Pickering (27m), Unknown (29m), Kalani Peyroux-Donaldson (36m), Unknown (40m), Unknown (42m), Unknown (47m); Con: Unknown (28m), Michael Bebbington (31m), Unknown (38m), Caleb Laiman (43m, 48m)		Try: Tasimani Lotima (33m), Josh Samuels (71m), Charvez Watts Ikitule (76m); Con: Lucas Adams 2/3 (34m, 77m)	Referee: Brent Newton, TJ's: Curtis Wharewaka and Paul Lorigan

12 July	Otahuhu	46-4	Papakura	Bert Henham Park 1, Otahuhu
2:30	Try: William Fakatoumafi, Phoenix Hunt, Toaiti Ramsay, Andrew Nansen, Atanasio Kuea, Bostyn Hakaraia 2, Dylan Tavita; Con: William Fakatoumafi 7		Try: Walter Fifita	Referee: Paki Parkinson, TJ's: Corey Jull and Ryan Doherty

===== Round 11 =====
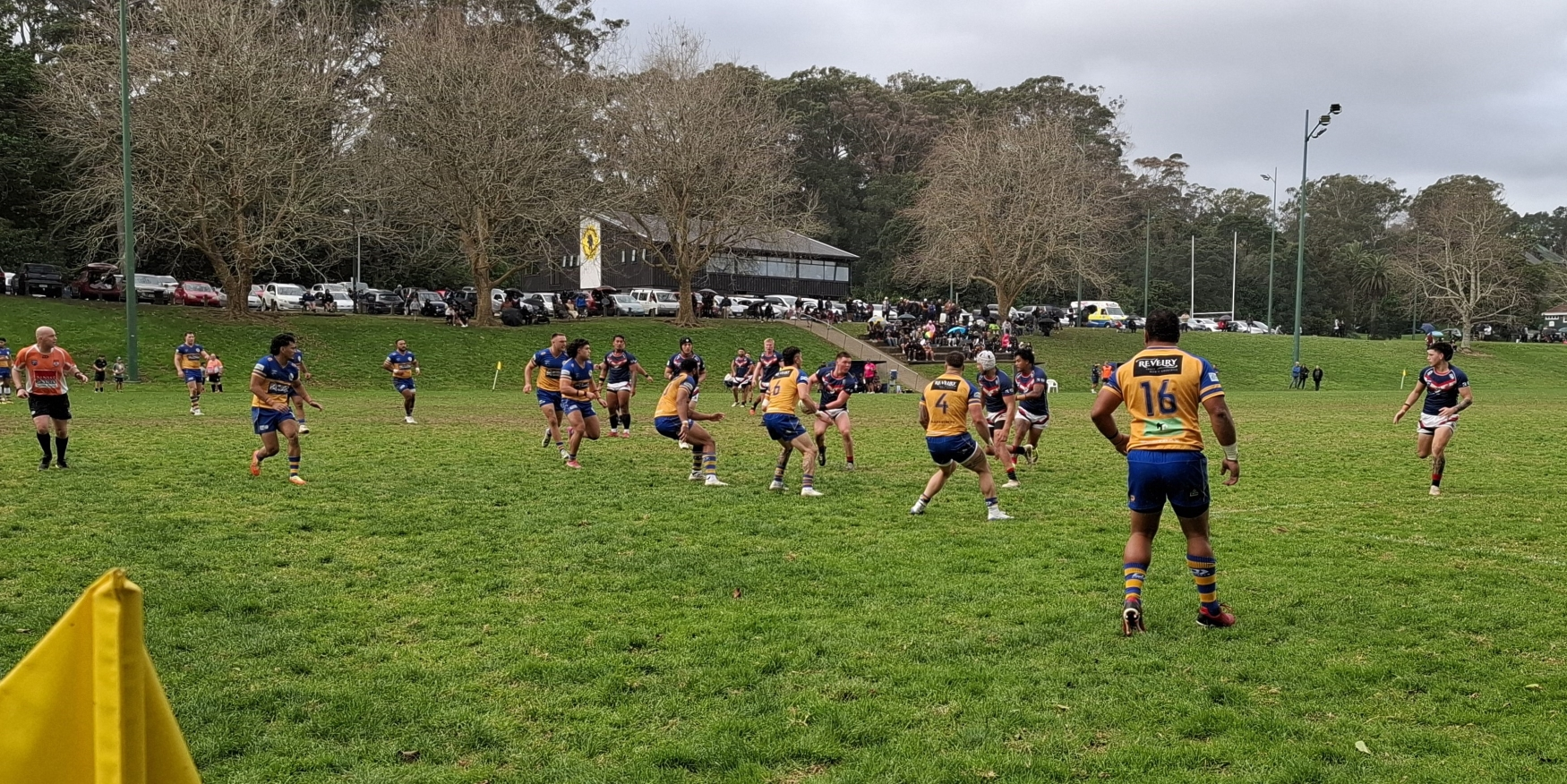
Lucas Adams (Te Atatu) passing to Francis Leger.

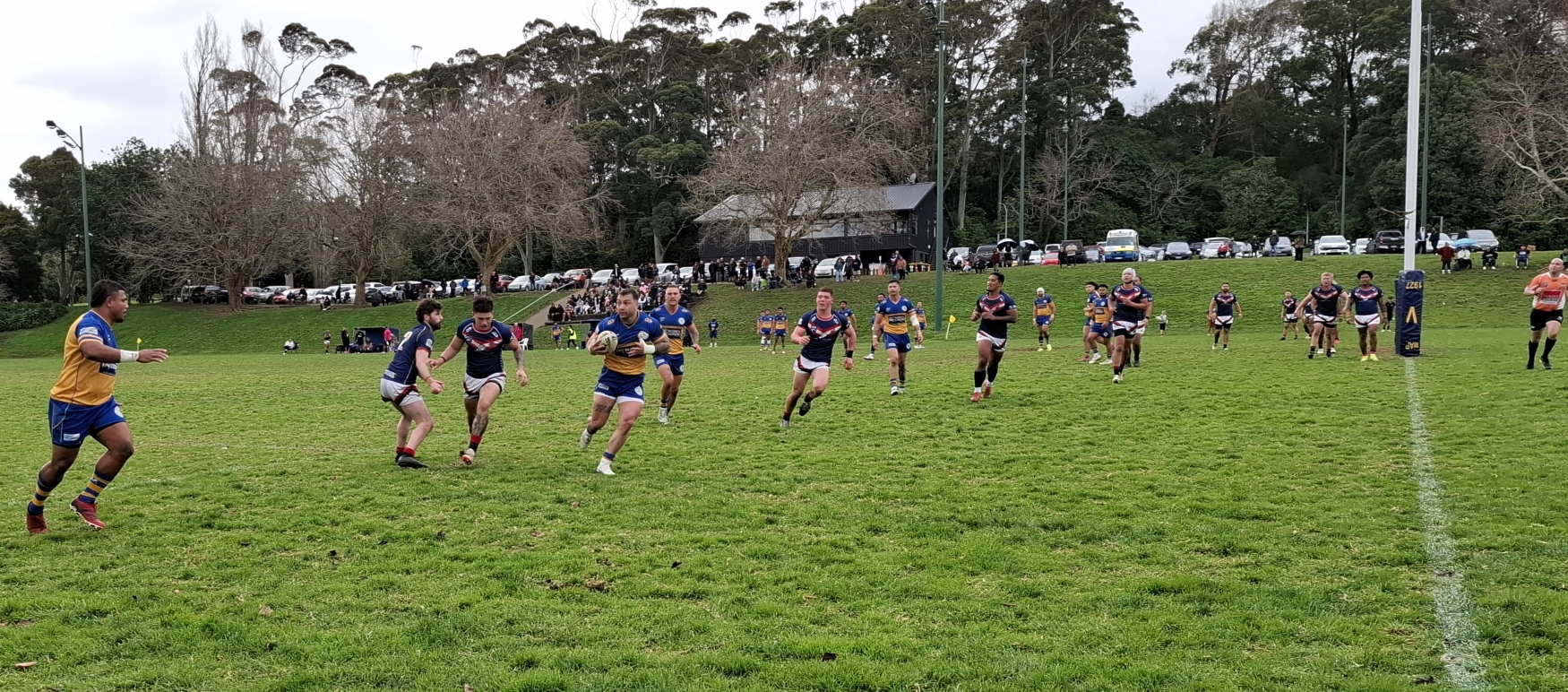
Chaz Brown passing to Jeremiah Poutu who scores in the first half for Mt Albert.

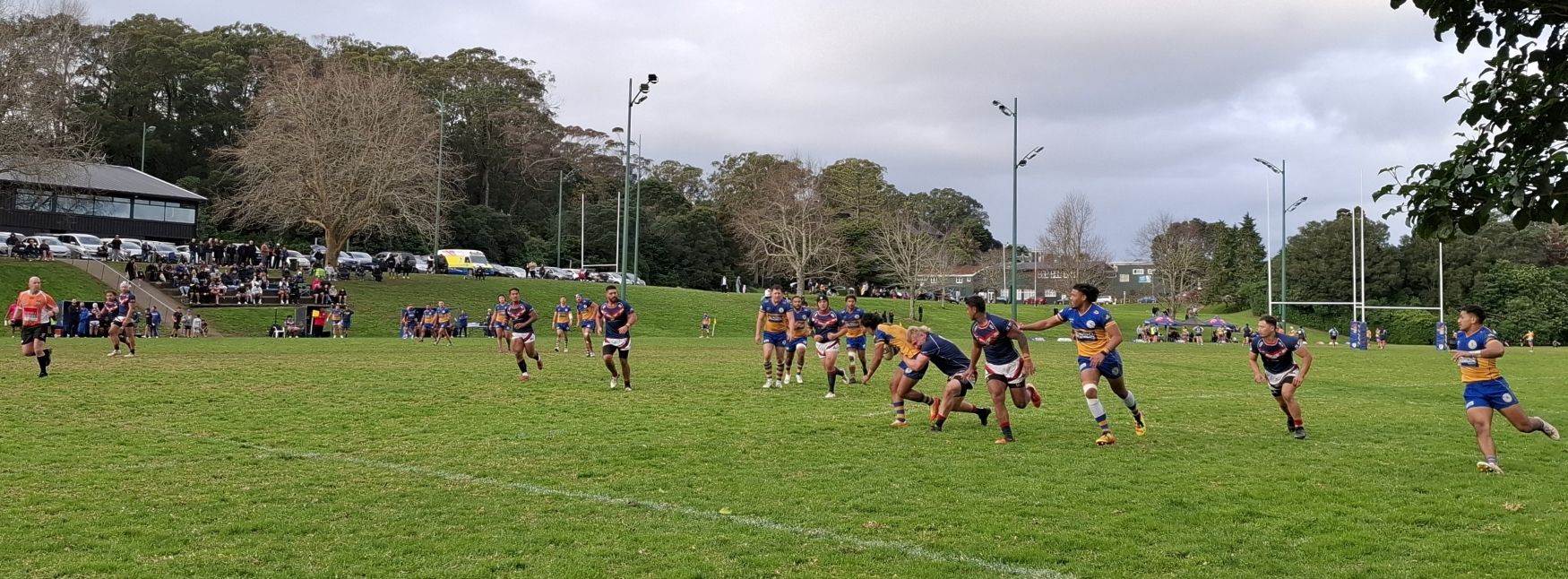
Luke Mayo making a tackle for Te Atatu.

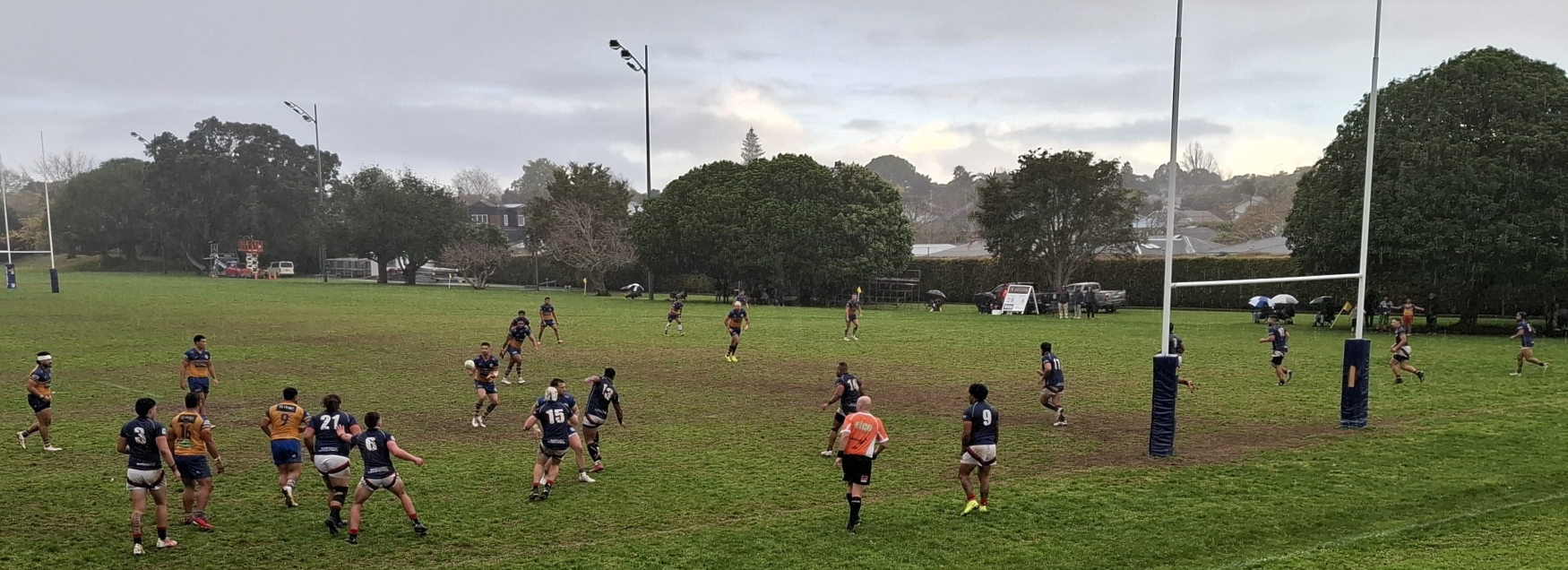
Kahil Johnson receiving a pass for Mt Albert in the final minutes.

Richmond scored two early tries to Seiulili'i Harrison Sutton and Ollie Horgan but then Marist replied with two tries of their own to narrow the score to 12-10 at halftime. However Richmond dominated the second half scoring four tries to take a 20 point win. At Victoria Park the Bay Roskill Vikings continued their good form with a 46-6 win over Ponsonby after a 20-0 halftime lead. Nixon Leaso scored twice while Jarvis Leaoseve scored three tries with Josh Tanielu converting four and Ben Henry one. The win kept their playoff hopes alive. At Prince Edward Park the home team suffered a second straight defeat going down to Manukau 25-22. The lead changed hands a few times during the match with Manukau eventually scoring the winning try in the 71st minute with Kahn Munokoa scoring his second after earlier running 80 metres to score his first. Leti Muller's conversion gave them a two point lead before he kicked a drop goal in the final stages. Raven Togiafofoa also scored twice for Manukau while for Papakura, Stedman Lefau scored two tries. Perhaps the try of the match went to Siave Togoiu who finished an attacking move which went the length of the field to score one of their other tries. Mt Albert sealed second place in the regular season with a 28-6 win over a gutsy Te Atatu side which defended well for much of the game, mainly only conceding tries on the edges. Te Atatu lost two chances to score on the left edge through a forward pass and a foot in touch, the second would have narrow the score to 16-10. Late in the first half Chaz Brown was sinbined for a leg trip on Lucas Adams who picked up a loose ball with a clear field ahead, while soon after Francis Leger was sinbinned for arguing with the referee following a penalty early in the second half. Mt Albert's points came from two tries to huge winger Jeremiah Poutu, while others went to David Jardine-Ngauamo, Thompson Karena, and Solomon Vasuvulagi, while Navajo Doyle converted four of them. Te Atatu's only try went to big prop Tasimani Lopita. Otahuhu extended their unbeaten run this season to fourteen after they ran out to a 30-0 halftime lead. Captain, Connor Taurua Purcell scored twice as did Toaiti Ramsay and Willam Fakatoumafi kicked four conversions.

19 July	Richmond	30-10 (12-10)	Marist	Grey Lynn Park 2, Grey Lynn
2:30	Try: Seiulili'i Harrison Sutton (7m), Ollie Horgan 2 (13m, 75m), Mose Newton (63m), Mike Williams (68m), Waikare Ratima (80m); Con: Hawaiiki Annandale 2 (9m, 65m), Ollie Horgan (14m)		Try: Afe Akau'ola (29m), Holyfield Kapsin (37m); Con: Holyfield Kapsin (31m)	Referee: Brent Newton, TJ's: Nigel Williams and Oliver Broadhead

19 July	Ponsonby	6-46 (0-20)	Bay Roskill	Victoria Park 1, Central City
2:30	Try: Epalahame Tafew (63m); Con: Felise Tau (64m)		Try: Nixon Leaso 2 (2m, 25m), Zion Tanielu (13m), Utterance Tanielu (21m), Zacchaeus Cordtz (51m), Jarvis Leaoseve 3 (55m, 63m, 78m), Ezekial Paul (60m); Con: Josh Tanielu 4 (15m, 27m, 61m, 65m), Ben Henry (56m)	Referee: Daniel Caddy, TJ's: Curtis Wharewaka and ?

19 July	Papakura	22-25 (12-14)	Manukau	Prince Edward Park 1, Papakura
2:30	Try: Stedman Lefau 2 (4m, 35m), Viliami Lolohea (46m), Siave Togoiu (60m); Con: James Dowie 3/4 (4m, 37m, 65m)		Try: Kahn Munokoa 2 (8m, 71m), Paea Fotu (20m), Raven Togiafofoa 2 (27m, 54m); Con: Leti Muller 2/5 (22m, 57m); Drop: Leti Muller (80m)	Referee: Anthony Eliott, TJ's: Michael Une and Moses Luke Ripia

19 July	Mt Albert	28-6 (16-6)	Te Atatu	Fowlds Park 1, Morningside
2:30	Try: David Jardine-Ngauamo (14m), Jeremiah Poutu 2 (23m, 33m), Thompson Karena (54m), Solomon Vasuvulagi (74m); Con: Navajo Doyle 4/5 (16m, 25m, 56m, 76m)		Try: Tasimani Lotima (38m); Con: Lucas Adams (40m)	Attendance: 200; Referee: David Millar, TJ's: Paul Lorigan and Chris Eagle

19 July	Pt Chevalier	10-36 (0-30)	Otahuhu	Walker Park 2, Pt Chevalier
2:30	Try: Hiraka Waitai-Haenga (46m), Jovilisi Sloan (79m); Con: Unknown (48m)		Try: Jamel Hunt (2m), Connor Taurua-Purcell 2 (22m, 26m), Sione Feao (29m), Toaiti Ramsay 2 (32m, 68m), Tevita Mikaele (39m); Con: William Fakatoumafi 4/7 (3m, 23m, 27m, 69m)	Referee: Chris McMillan, TJ's: Corey Jull and Leigh Fletcher

===== Round 12 =====
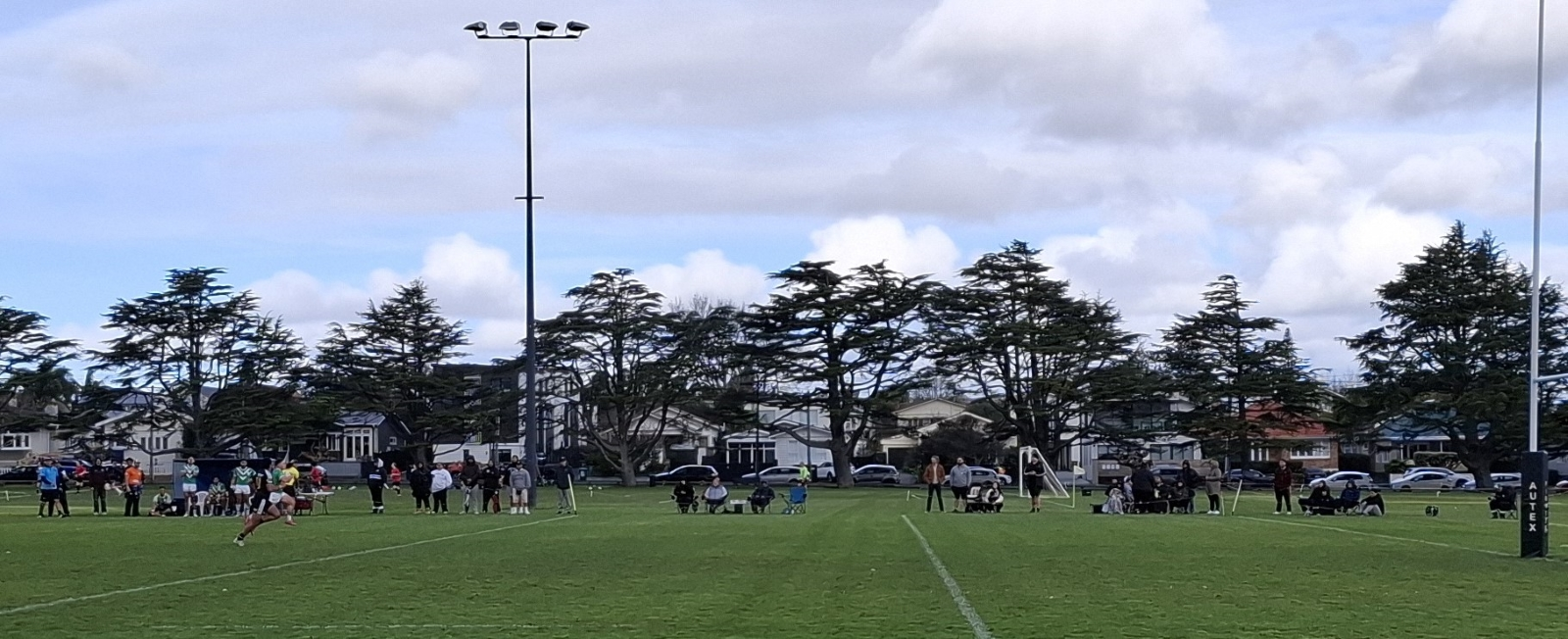
Taipari Wikitera scoring for Pt Chevalier late in the first half v Manukau.

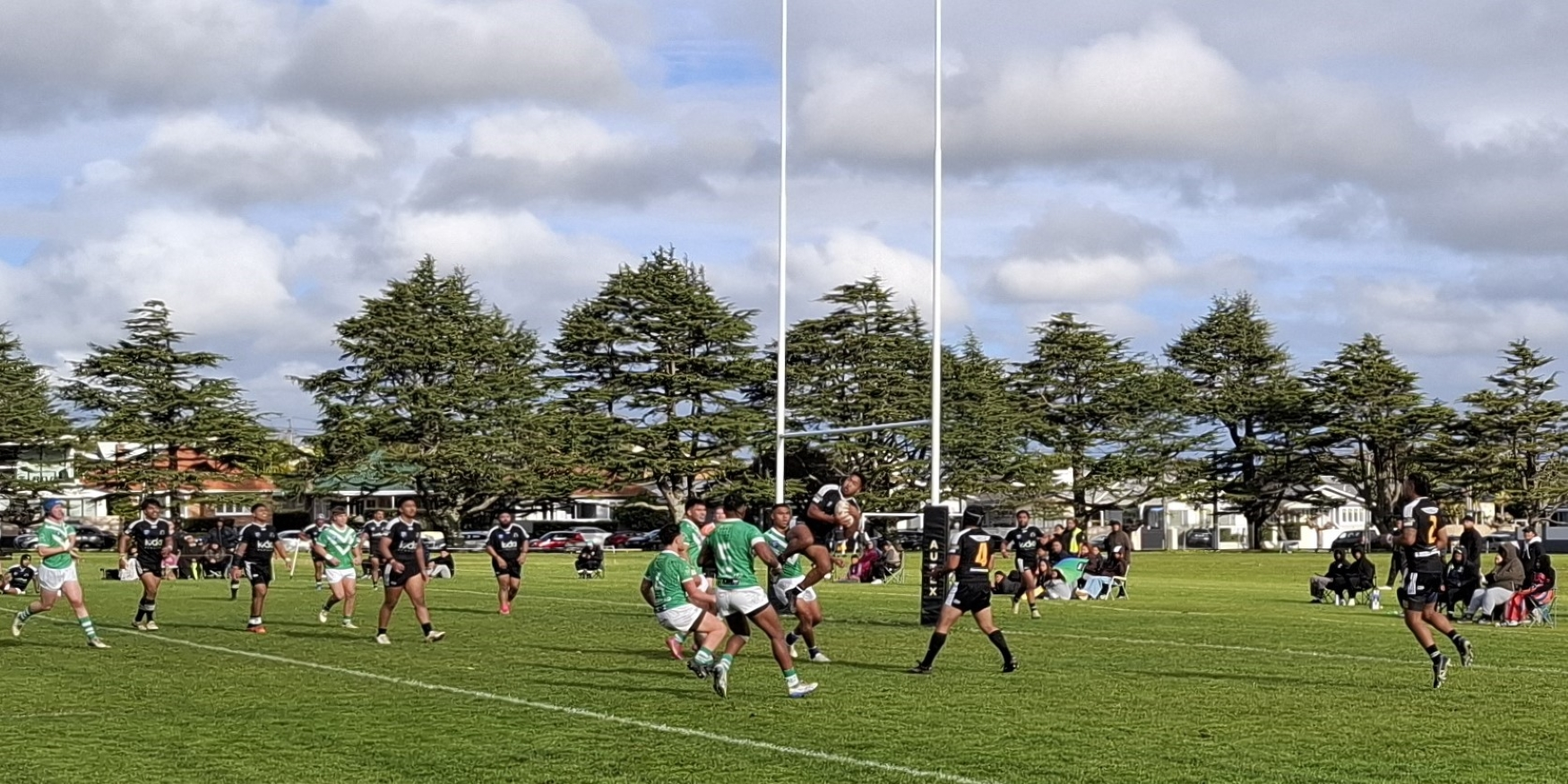
Samuel Nati leaping to catch a kick for Manukau.

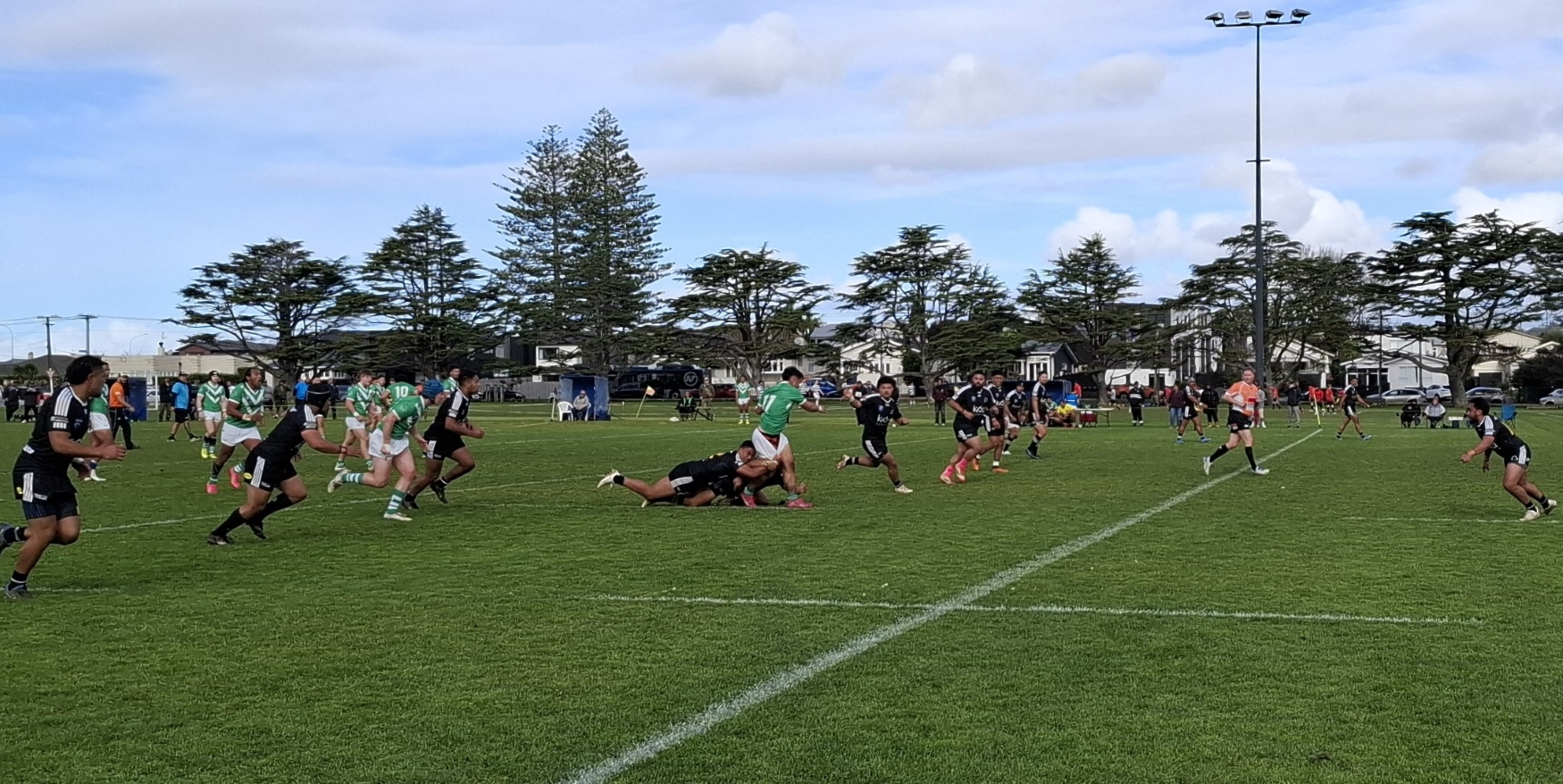
Dezman Laban carrying the ball into the Manukau line.

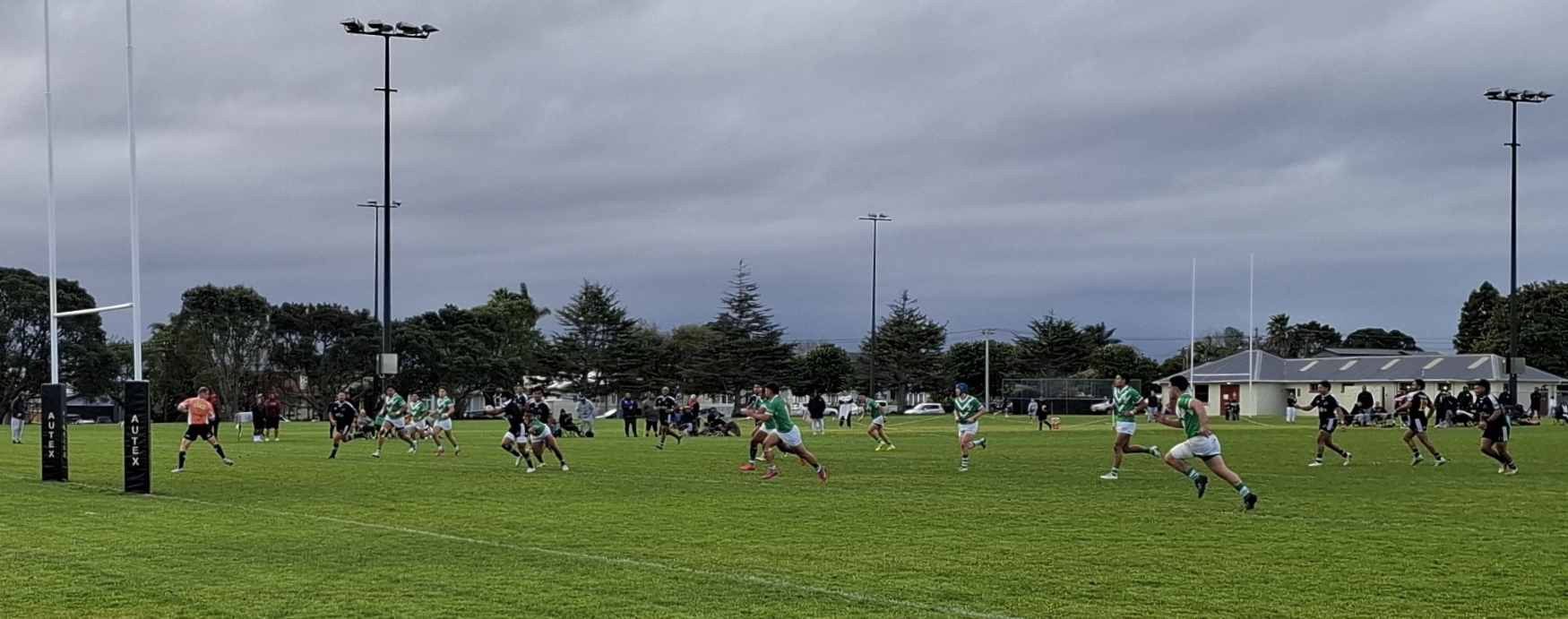
Leti Muller scoring to give Manukau a 16-12 lead in the second half.

Otahuhu defended the Roope Rooster Trophy to retain it for the summer, and were also awarded the Rukutai Shield for winning the regular season. Ben Wharton-Benedict was also presented with his 'Leopard Ring' for playing 100 games for Otahuhu. Their 26-4 win over second placed Mt Albert was also their 15th consecutive win of the season. After Jeremiah Pouto scored for the Lions in the 4th minute they may have held hopes of an upset but those were to be their only points with Otahuhu scoring four converted tries to Tevita Mikaele, Conor Taurua-Purcell, Fine Vakautakakala, and Viliami Kuli with William Fakatoumafi converting all of them and adding a penalty. Richmond struggled to overcome Ponsonby for a long time in their game at Frey Lynn Park where the new seating area had been opened. Ponsonby led 14-10 at halftime before Richmond then began to dominate running in six second half tries including two to Trujon Nomani-Brown who also kicked five conversions. The loss meant that Ponsonby finished last on points differential behind Te Atatu. Papakura fullback James Dowie was said to be playing his 50th game for the club in their narrow 22-16 win over Marist who put up a much stronger showing than recent weeks and had led 14-10 at halftime. The win for the Sea Eagles assured them of a home quarterfinal for the following week. Bay Roskill gave themselves a chance of making the playoffs with a comfortable 44-18 win over Te Atatu. Nixon Leaso scored three tries while Josh Tanielu scored two and kicked four conversions. For Te Atatu centre Lucas Adams converted all three tries, one of which was scored by Noah Godfrey who was on debut. At Walker Park Pt Chevalier needed a win to guarantee a playoff spot with Bay Roskill and Richmond both winning their games. With time nearly up Jovilisi Jake Sloan scored but the Pirates were unable to convert the try from wide out with a draw meaning they missed the playoffs for the first time in many years. Manukau secured third position with the draw. The Pirates had jumped out to an 8-0 lead after 6 minutes with a double to Juelz Baker but the Magpies quickly replied when Samuel Nati gathered a kick allowed to bounce under the crossbar and fell over the line and then Kahn Munukoa regained the ball from a kick and ran over near the posts. Then in the second half Leti Muller cut through the defence and beat Setu Tu to score under the posts.

26 July	Richmond	46-24 (10-14)	Ponsonby	Grey Lynn Park 2, Grey Lynn
2:30	Try: Trent Schaumkel (23m), Delano Atai (31m), Ollie Horgan (41m), Trujon Nomani-Brown 2 (46m, 58m), Mike Williams (54m), Sione Ngahe (70m), Caleb Savelio-Thompson (75m); Con: Trujon Nomani-Brown 5 (24m, 42m, 48m, 55m, 60m), Delano Atai 2 (71m, 77m)		Try: Jesse Siolo (7m), Heitony Talagi (27m), Tevita Faiva (38m), Timor Williams (63m), Felise Tau (80m); Con: Felise Tau (28m), Morgan Grace (80m)	Referee: Brent Newton, TJ's: Curtis Wharewaka and ?

26 July	Papakura	22-16 (10-12)	Marist	Prince Edward Park 1, Papakura
2:30	Try: Siave Togoiu (12m), Jese Qaraniqio (31m), Christopher Masina Tuivai-Lopa (52m), Walter Fifita 2 (60m, 65m); Con: James Dowie (32m)		Try: Sione Langatau (25m), Elijah Sami (36m), Kisione Fakafanua (44m); Con: Laurence McFall (27m, 38m)	Referee: David Millar, TJ's: Moses Luke Ripia and Jericho Paul

26 July	Bay Roskill	44-18 (22-12)	Te Atatu	Blockhouse Bay Reserve 4, Blockhouse Bay
2:30	Try: Nixon Leaso 3 (13m, 51m, 63m), Zacchaeus Cordtz (21m), Josh Tanielu 2 (26m, 80m), Zion Tanielu (37m), Xavier Tutaki (55m), Ezekial Paul (77m); Con: Josh Tanielu 4 (22m, 27m, 38m, 56m)		Try: Patrick Ioane-Unasa (7m), Noah Godfrey (32m), Charvez Watts Ikitule (43m); Con: Lucas Adams 3/3 (9m, 32m, 45m)	Referee: Keven Ah-Ken, TJ's: Paul Lorigan and Ngaone

26 July	Pt Chevalier	18-18 (14-12)	Manukau	Walker Park 2, Pt Chevalier
2:30	Try: Juelz Baker 2 (3m, 6m), Taipari Wikitera (32m), Jovilisi Jake Sloan (78m); Con: James Marriott (34m)		Try: Samuel Nati (10m), Kahn Munokoa (13m), Leti Muller (52m); Con: Leti Muller 3/3 (11m, 15m, 54m)	Attendance: 200; Referee: Anthony Eliott, TJ's: Hemana Ryan and Corey Jull

26 July	Otahuhu	26-4 (6-4)	Mt Albert	Bert Henham Park 1, Otahuhu
2:30	Try: Tevita Mikaele (12m), Conor Taurua-Purcell (44m), Fine Vakautakakala (57m), Viliami Kuli (69m); Con: William Fakatoumafi 4/4 (14m, 45m, 58m, 70m); Pen: William Fakatoumafi 1/1 (65m)		Try: Jeremiah Poutu (4m)	Referee: Chris McMillan, TJ's: Tameilau Pauuvale and Leigh Fletcher

==== Playoffs ====
===== Quarterfinals =====
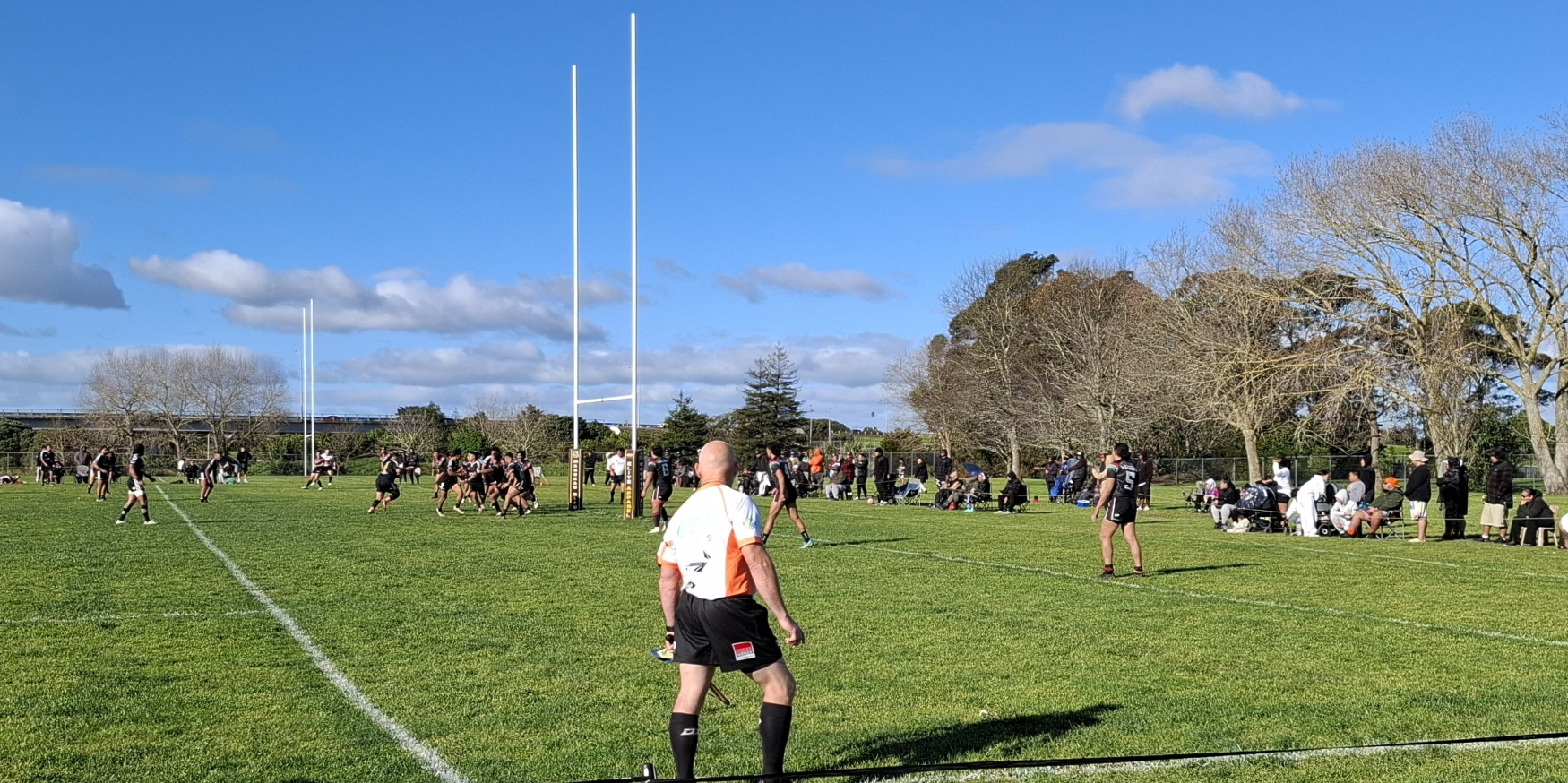
Taunga Arama about to crash through the defence to score Manukau's first try in the first half.

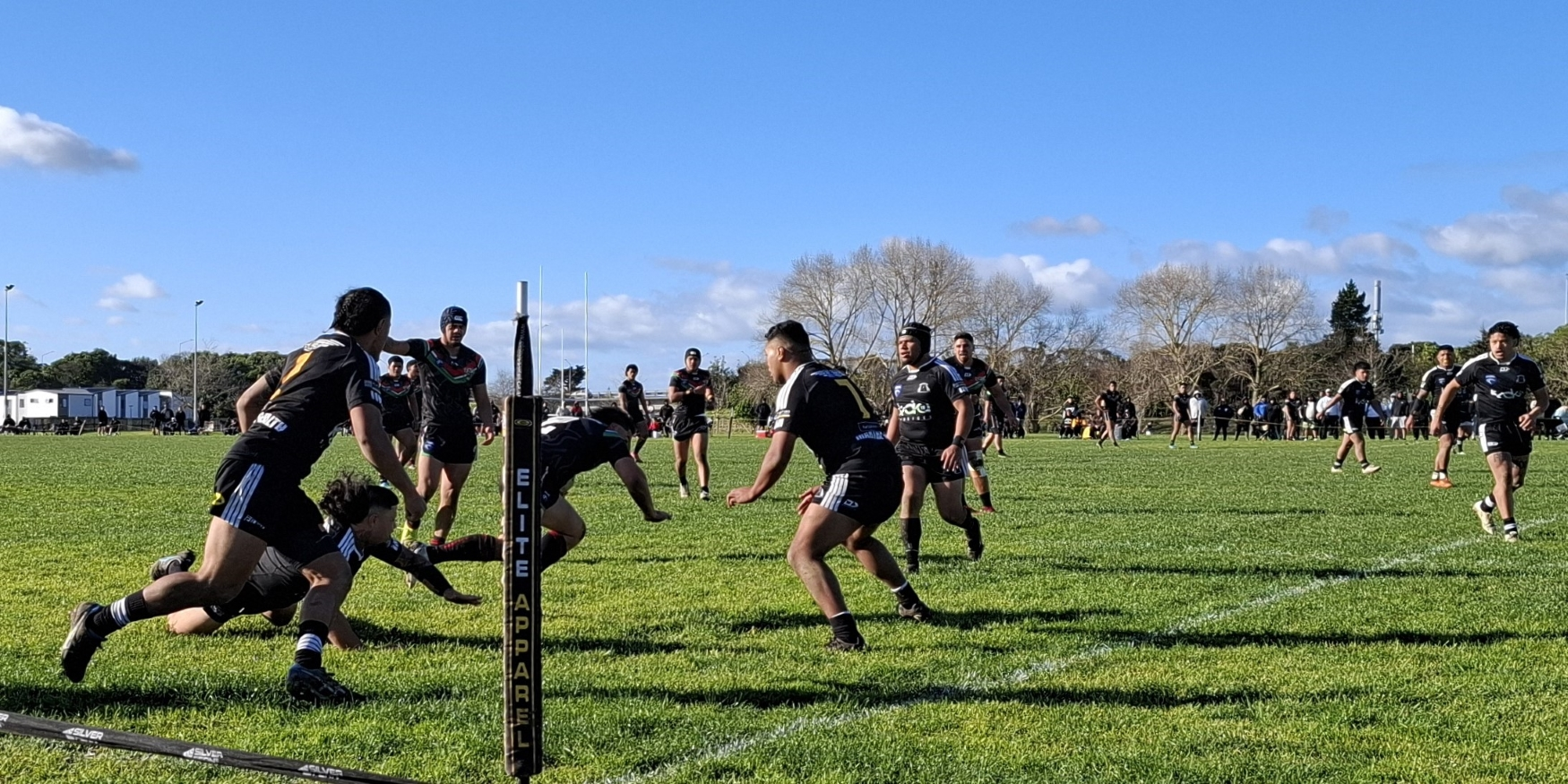
Timothy Vogel after being hit high in the second half for Bay Roskill.

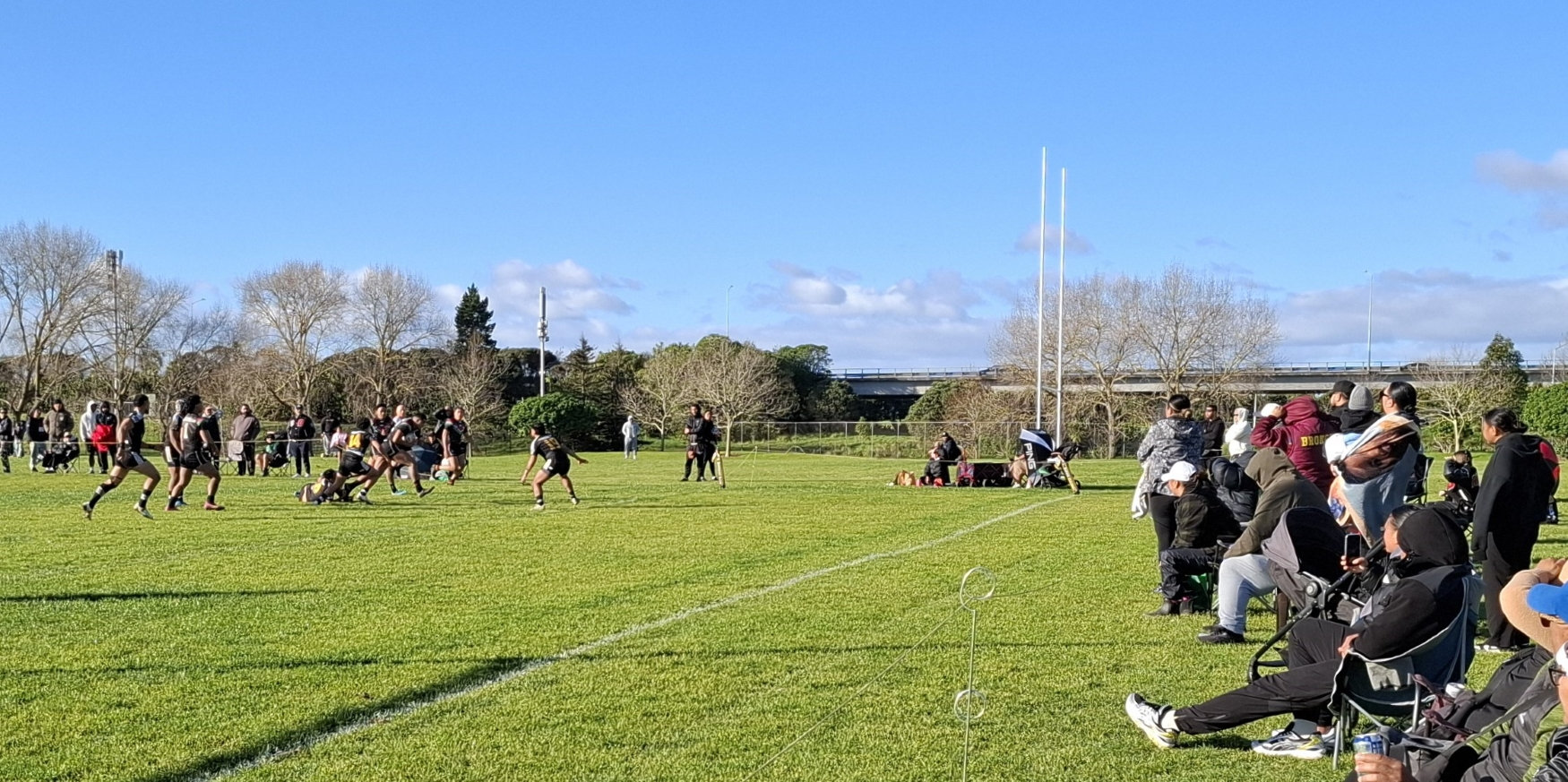
Zion Tanielu breaking through tackles to give Bay Roskill a 22-6 lead.

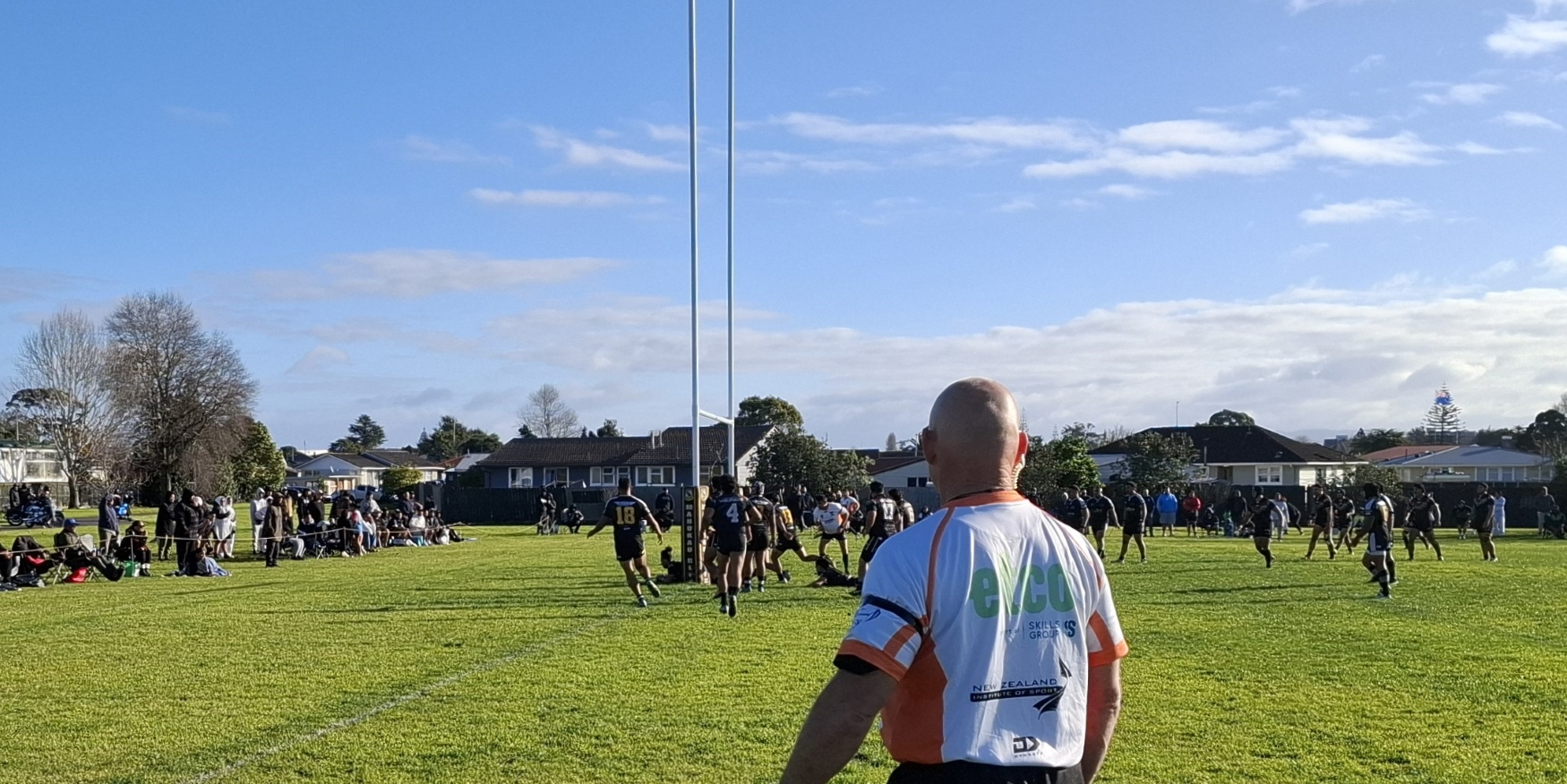
Justus Leaoseve gathers in a loose ball from a kick to make the score 26-12 with just over ten minutes remaining.

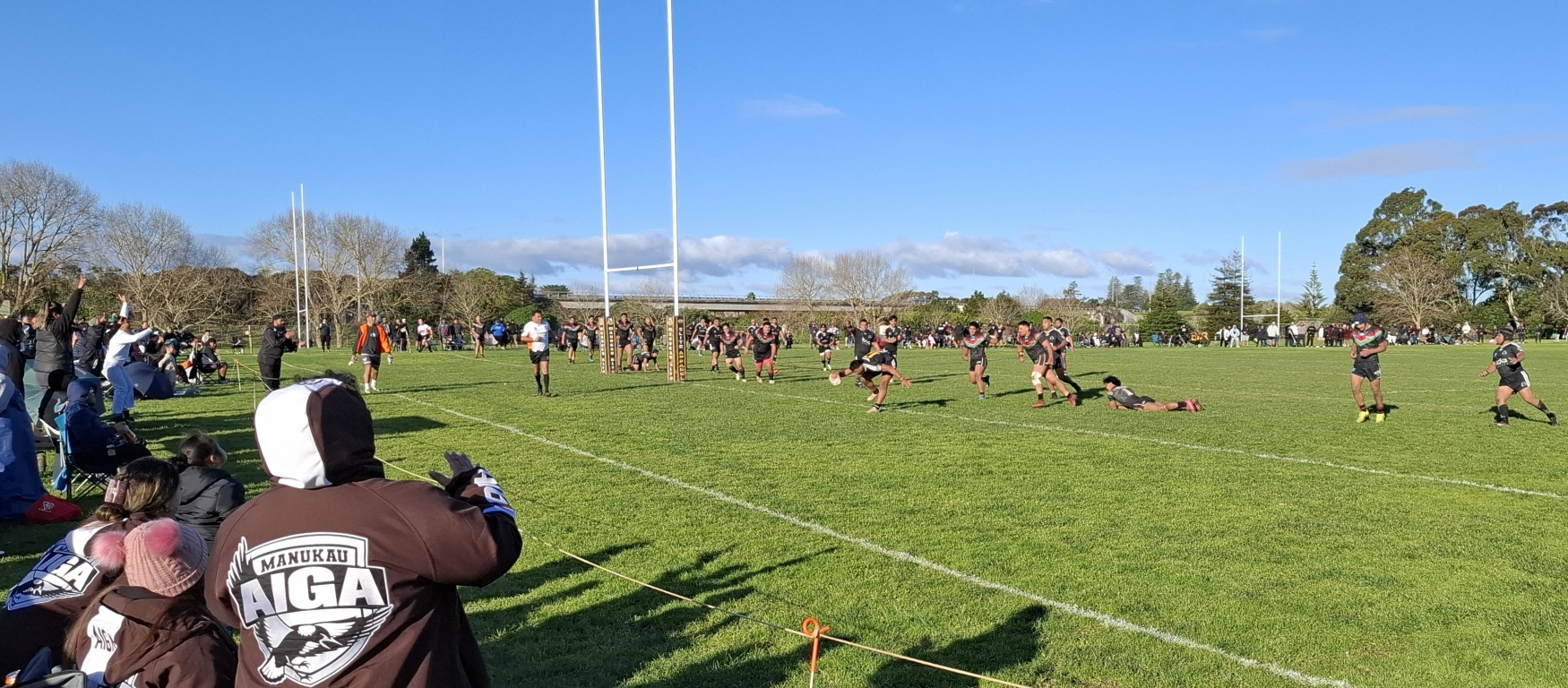
Moreketai Moananu scoring after Sameul Nati put him through a hole with four minutes left.

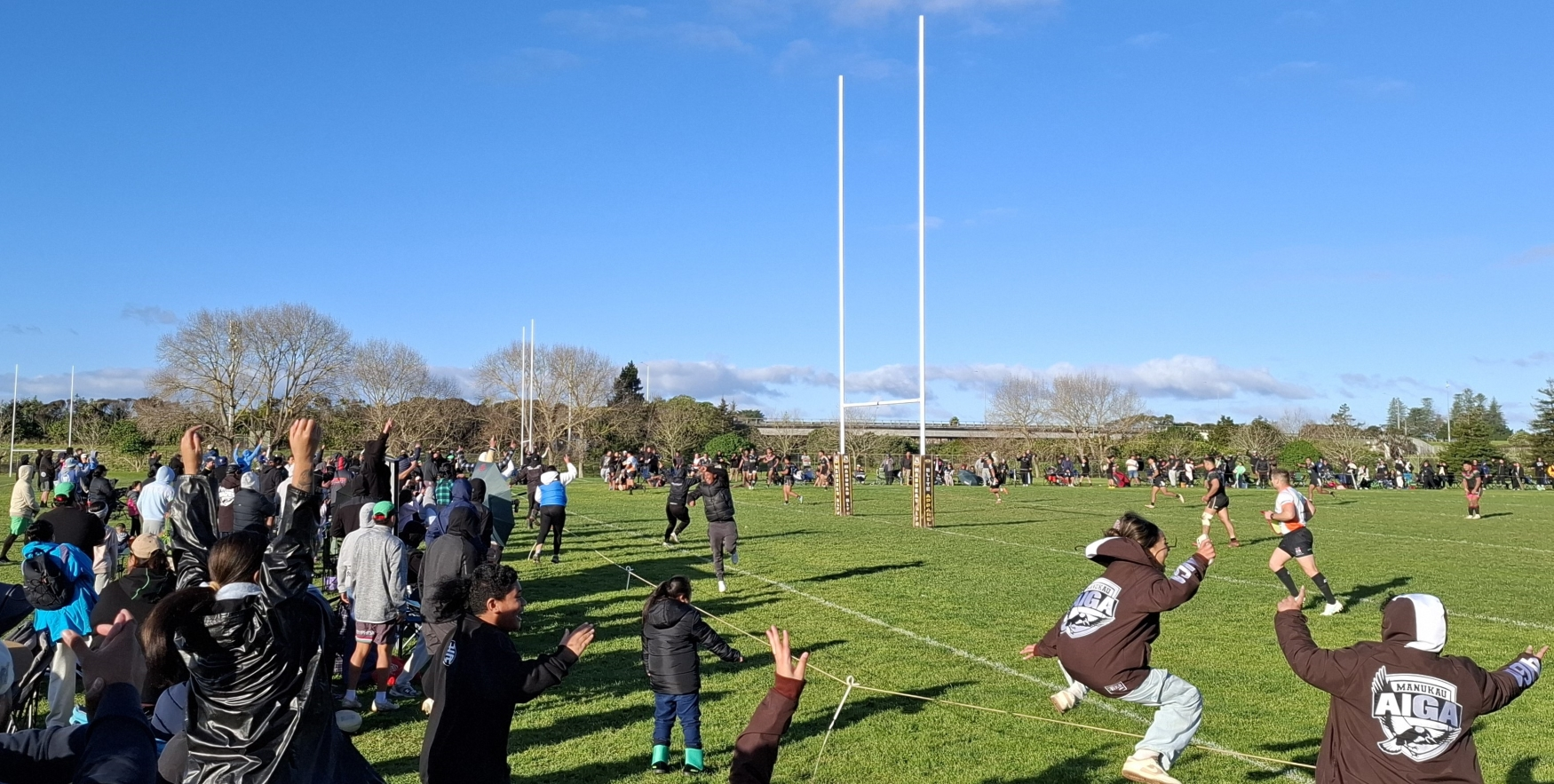
Manukau supporters celebrating the game tying try to Paea Fotu with time up. Leti Muller's conversion gave Manukau the win.

Before a crowd of around 600 at Moyle Park in Māngere, the home side, Manukau Magpies pulled off a stunning comeback win over Bay Roskill Vikings. The Vikings had dominated the majority of the game by continuously moving the ball when in possession, running in 5 tries. Zion Tanielu dived through for his second try in the 51st minute to give them a 22-6 lead, and then Justus Leaoseve recovered a loose ball from an attacking kick under the posts with Josh Tanielu's conversion making it 28-12 with ten minutes remaining. Manukau began their comeback with a try on the right edge to loose forward, Aisake Tauatina, who was put through a hole by Leti Muller, then 6 minutes later Moreketai Moananu took a pass from Samuel Nati with the Vikings defence in disarray to score to the left of the posts. Muller converted both tries to narrow the score to 28-24. Then from the kickoff they attacked down the right side with Kahn Munokoa sprinting down field before being taken to ground. He wasn't held and got to his feet to offload, the ball eventually finding its way into the hands of Paea Fotu who beat the scrambling defence in the dying seconds of the match before an excited home crowd. Muller kicked the conversion from wide out on the right to win the match and send Manukau into the Fox Memorial semi finals for the first time in many years. Their opponent would be the Mt Albert Lions. At Prince Edward Park, Papakura ended Richmond's title defence in a replay of the 2024 with a 32-24 win. The Sea Eagles opened the scoring with a try to standoff Liam Prendergast in the 3rd minute converted by James Dowie. Richmond replied soon after when Waikare Ratima crossed for Trujon Nomai-Brown to level the scores. Papakura then retook the lead when they scored tries to Dowie and Arthur Crichton. A try to Kaylis Lundon, converted by Nomani-Brown meant the home side led by just 16-12 at the break. They extended their lead when Crichton scored his second try five minutes into the second half with the teams trading points with Mike Williams try which was converted putting the game in the balance at 28-24 with 20 minutes remaining. However winger Chris Masina Tuivai-Lopa gave Papakura an eight point lead when he crossed in the 63rd minute and they were attacking on full time when the final whistle went. The win meant that they would travel to Bert Henham Park to play Otahuhu in the other semi final.

2 August	Manukau	30-28 (6-12)	Bay Roskill	Moyle Park 1, Māngere
2:30	Try: Taunga Arama (30m), Kahn Munokoa (60m), Aisake Tauatina (69m), Moreketai Moananu (76m), Paea Fotu (79m); Con: Leti Muller 5/5 (32m, 61m, 70m, 77m, 80m)		Try: Xavier Tutaki (13m), Renouf Oge (22m), Zion Tanielu 2 (46m, 51m), Justus Leaoseve (69m); Con: Josh Tanielu 4/5 (15m, 24m, 47m, 70m)	Attendance: 600; Referee: Daniel Caddy, TJ's: Chris McMillan and Leigh Fletcher

2 August	Papakura	32-24 (16-12)	Richmond	Prince Edward Park 1, Papakura
2:30	Try: Liam Prendergast (3m), James Dowie (17m), Arthur Crichton 2 (20m, 46m), Jese Qaraniqio (53m), Christopher Tuivai-Lopa (63m); Con: James Dowie 4 (4m, 21m, 47m, 54m)		Try: Waikare Ratima (10m), Kaylis Lundon (30m), Casey Tomai (50m), Mike Williams (59m); Con: Trujon Nomani-Brown 4 (13m, 30m, 50m, 59m)	Referee: Paki Parkinson, TJ's: Anthony Eliott and Corey Jull

===== Semi Finals =====
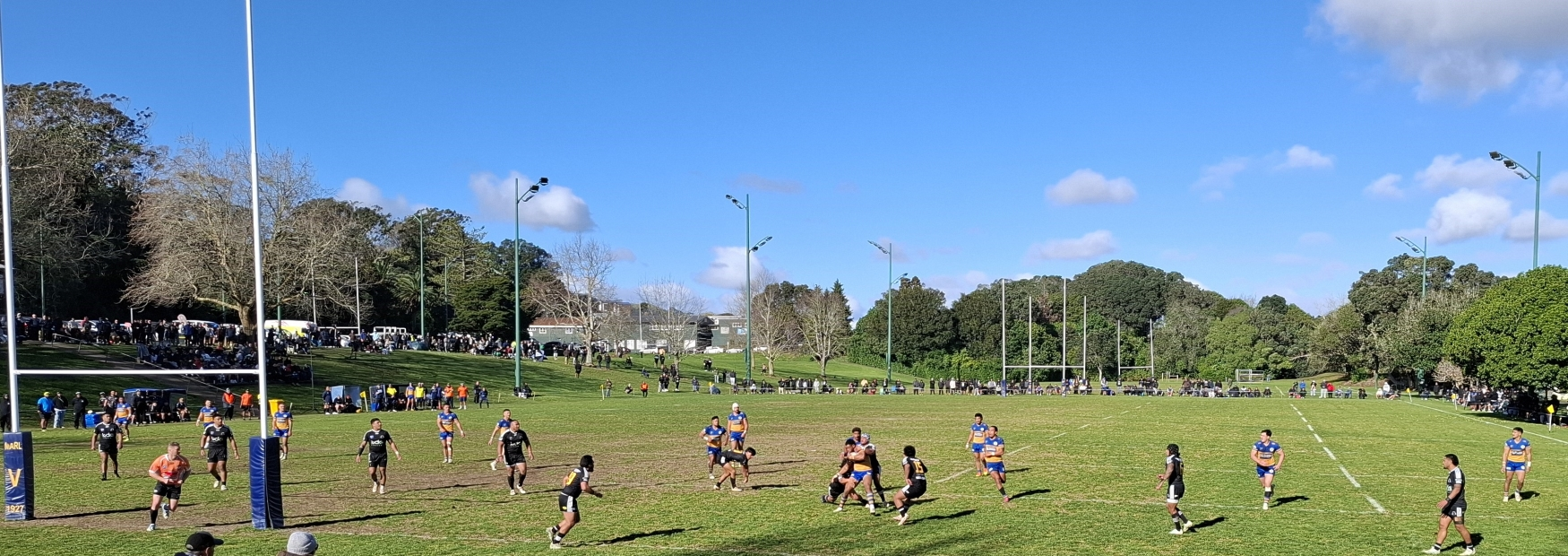
Solomon Vasuvulagi attacking for Mt Albert.

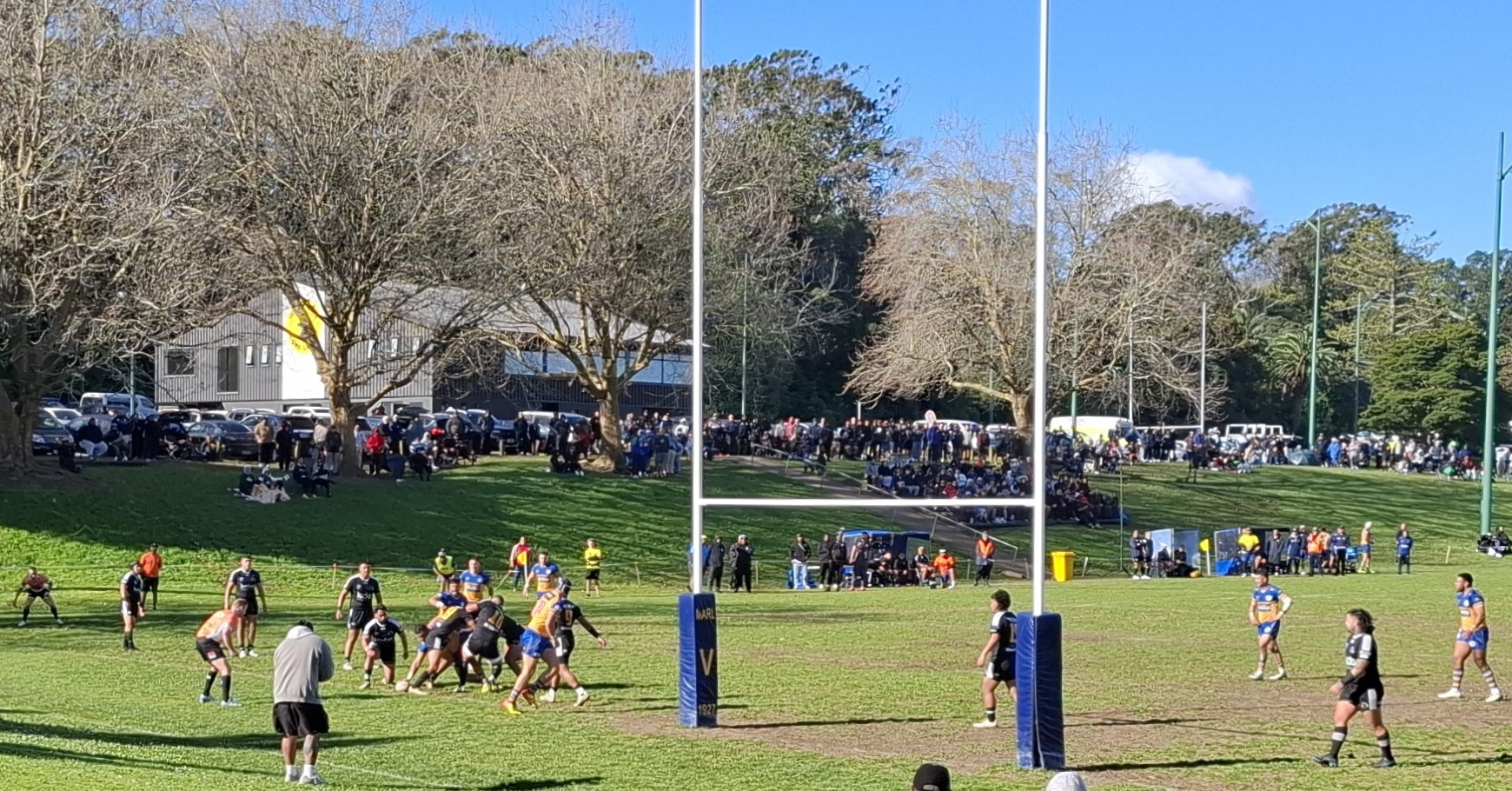
Jeremiah Poutu ruled to have grounded the ball just short by Anthony Eliott.

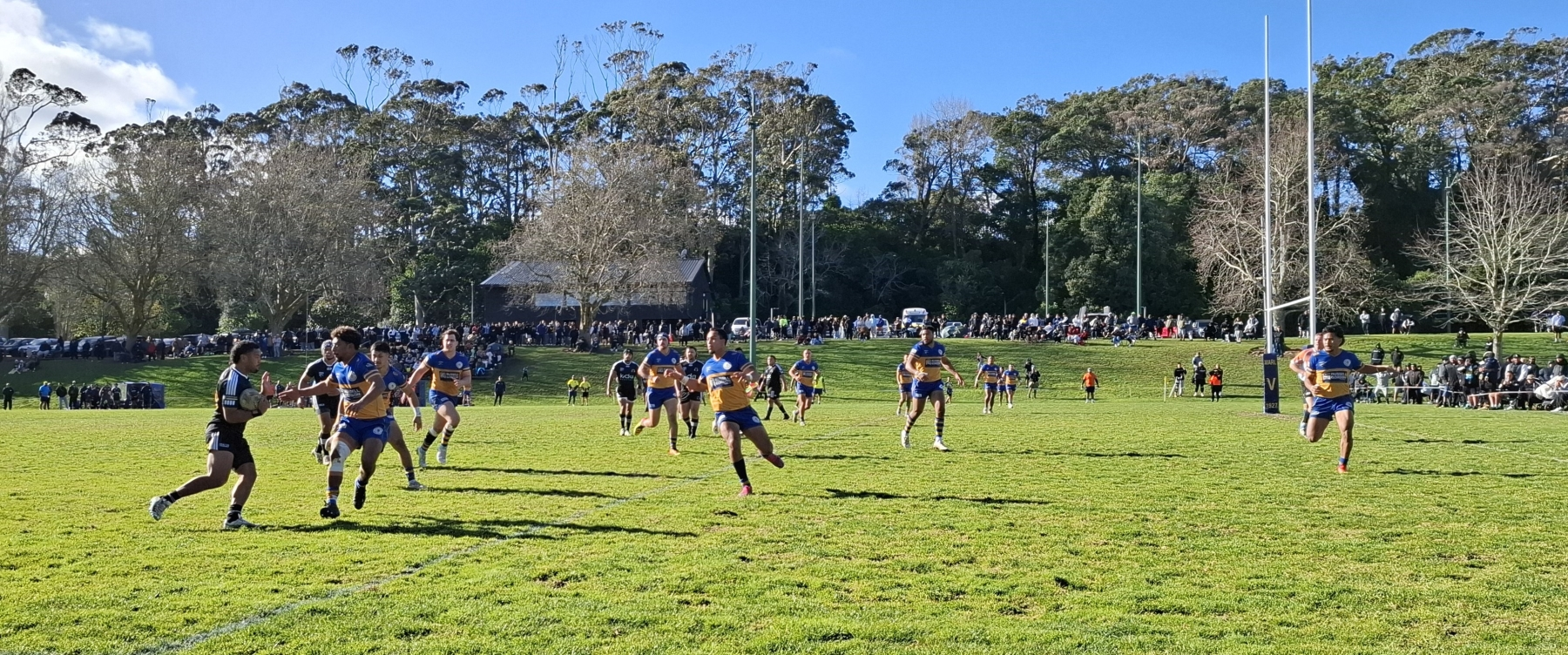
Sisi Toutai with the ball for Manukau in the first half.

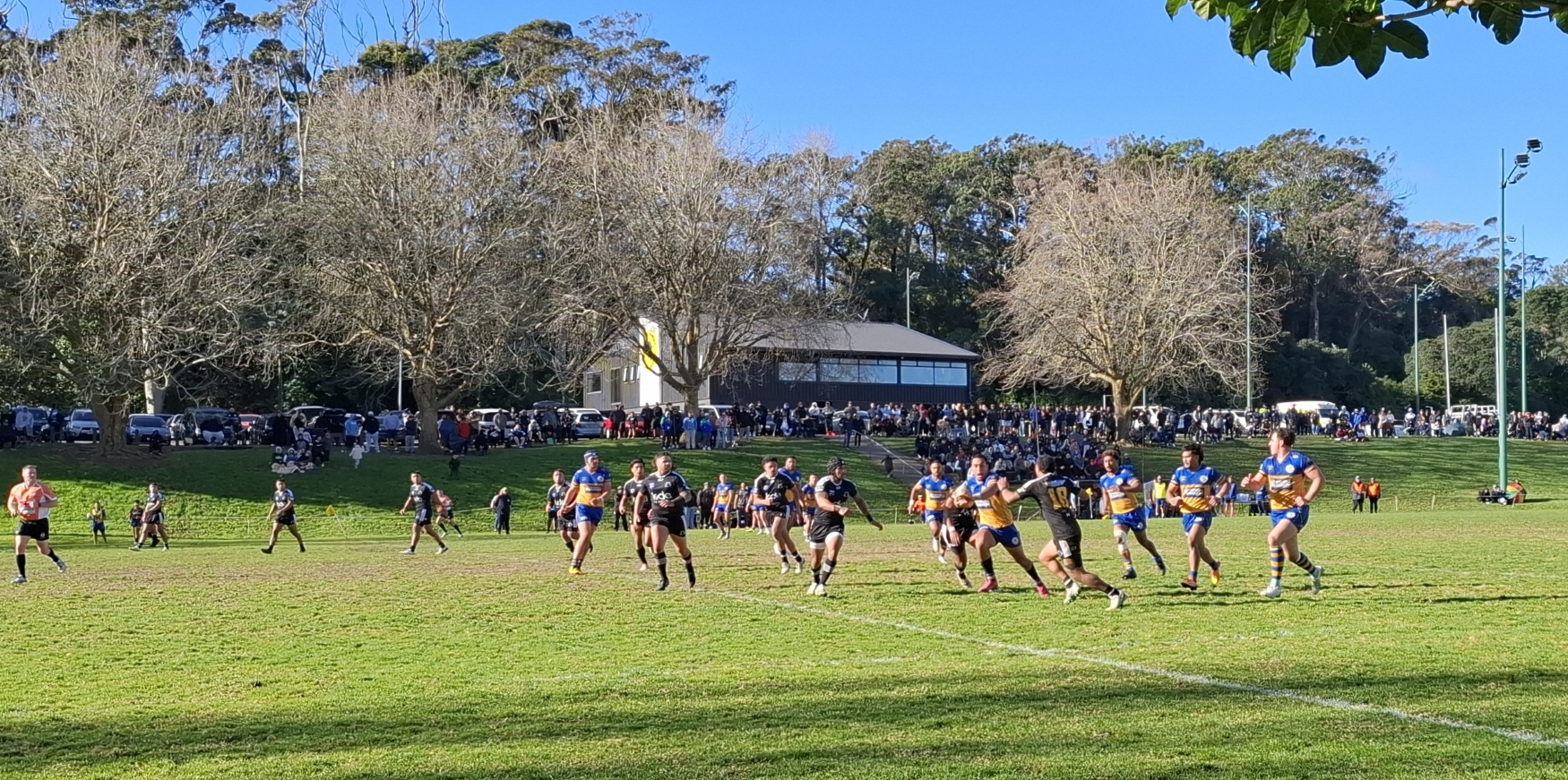
Lyrakai-Layke Posimani about to offload for Mt Albert.

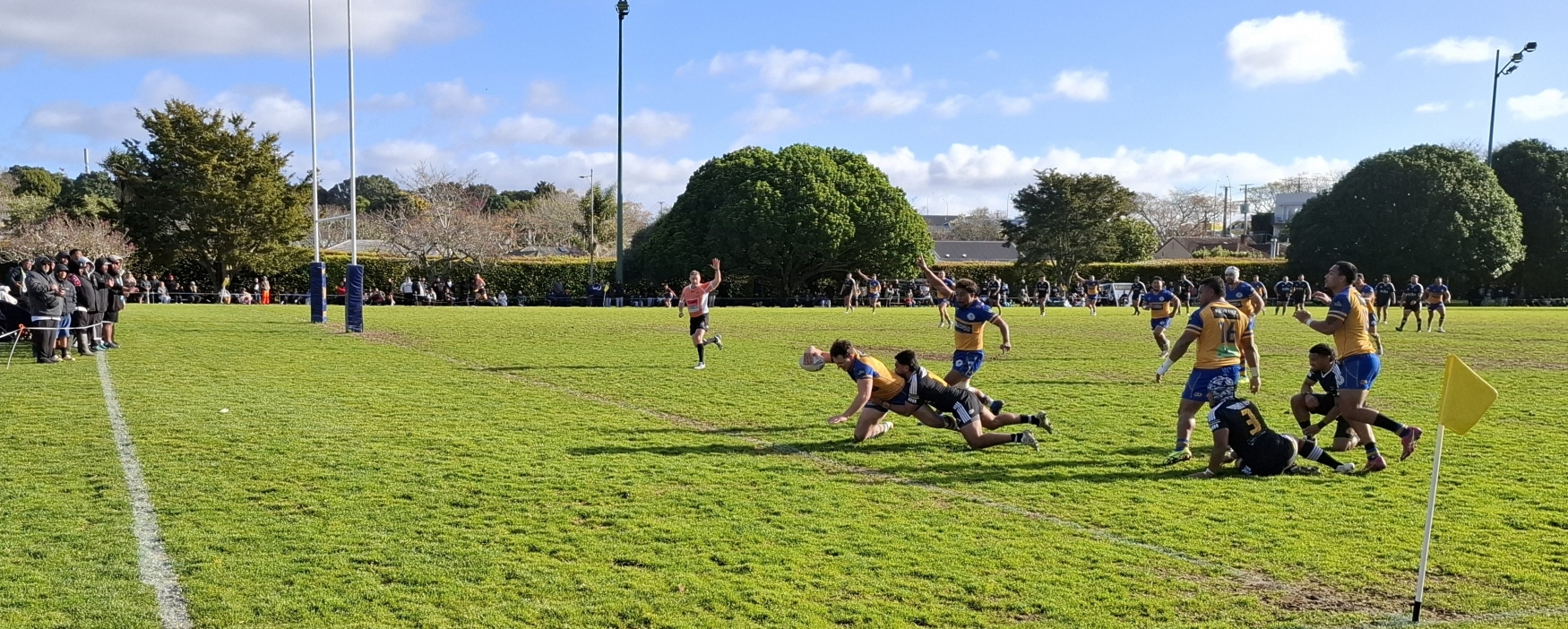
Thompson Karena scoring to give Mt Albert a 22-6 lead.

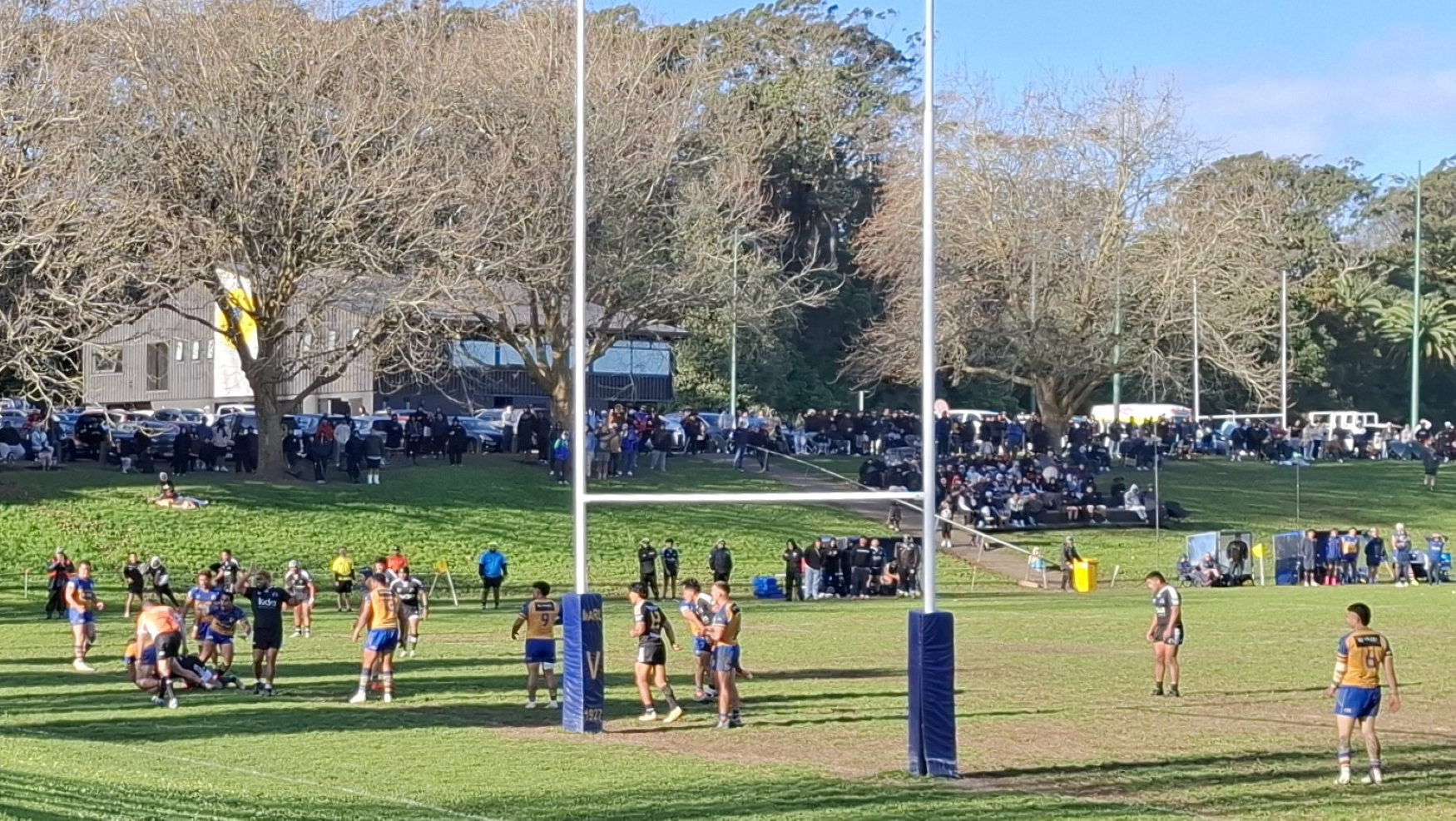
Manukau forward, Paea Folau scoring to make it 22-10 in the 73rd minute.

Mt Albert held on to win 22-16 over a Manukau side which was unable to replicate its previous weeks come back feat. The Mt Albert forwards dominated much of the game and played error free football with Solomon Vasuvulagi and Lyrakai-Layke Posimani causing problems for the Manukau defence. Posimani opened the scoring when they outnumbered the defence on the left edge. Manukau had a few opportunities on attack but made errors then on the stroke of halftime Mt Albert attacked and made a break on the right before the ball found Jeremiah Poutu who fed inside to a supporting Kahil Johnson to cross to give the home team a 12-0 lead. They went further in front when Johnson kicked a penalty and then Poutu gathered a bouncing kick to narrowly stay in field and then in a tackle he offloaded to Thompson Karena who reached out to score. Manukau got on the scoreboard when Taunga Arama crashed over and Leti Muller converted but Mt Albert restored their lead when Poutu went over in the left corner after nice lead up play. With 7 minutes remaining Paea Folau crashed over and Leti Muller converted to make the score 22-12. Then almost on full time they scored in the left corner when Koronato John went over. There was no time for the restart and Mt Albert were left to celebrate their first grand final appearance since 2019. Papakura threatened a huge upset at Bert Henham Park when they held the lead late in the match before Otahuhu levelled and then finished stronger. Papakura scored in the opening minutes when Chris Masina Tuivai-Lopa crossed. Otahuhu replied with a converted try to Jamel Hunt, with the conversion putting them ahead. Papakura regained the lead when Tuivai-Lopa scored his second, before a Dylan Tavita try, converted by William Fakatoumafi gave the Leopards a 12-8 halftime lead. The Sea Eagles retook the lead when Jese Qarantiqo crashed over in the 52nd minute and James Dowie's conversion put them 14-12 in front. They held the lead until the 67th minute when Fakatoumafi kicked a conversion to level the scores and then two minutes from time a field goal put them in front. Then on full time Jamel Hunt scored his second to seal the victory and send them to their first grand final since 2011.

9 August	Mt Albert	22-16 (12-0)	Manukau	Fowlds Park 1, Morningside
2:30	Try: Lyrakai-Layke Posimani (12m), Kahil Johnson (40m), Thompson Karena (53m), Jeremiah Poutu (63m); Con: Navajo Doyle (13m), Kahil Johnson (40m); Pen: Kahil Johnson (51m)		Try: Taunga Arama (57m), Paea Folau (73m), Koronato John (78m); Con: Leti Muller 2/3 (60m, 75m)	Attendance: 600; Referee: Anthony Eliott, TJ's: Paki Parkinson and Corey Jull

9 August	Otahuhu	21-14 (12-8)	Papakura	Bert Henham Park, Otahuhu
2:30	Try: Jamel Hunt 2 (12m, 80m), Dylan Tavita (40m); Con: William Fakatoumafi 3/3 (13m, 40m, 80m); Pen: William Fakatoumafi 1/1 (67m); Drop: William Fakatoumafi 1/1 (78m)		Try: Chris Masina Tuivai-Lopa 2 (1m, 17m), Jese Qaraniqo (52m); Con: James Dowie 1/3 (53m)	Referee: Chris McMillan, TJ's: Daniel Caddy and David Millar

===== Fox Memorial Shield Grand Final =====
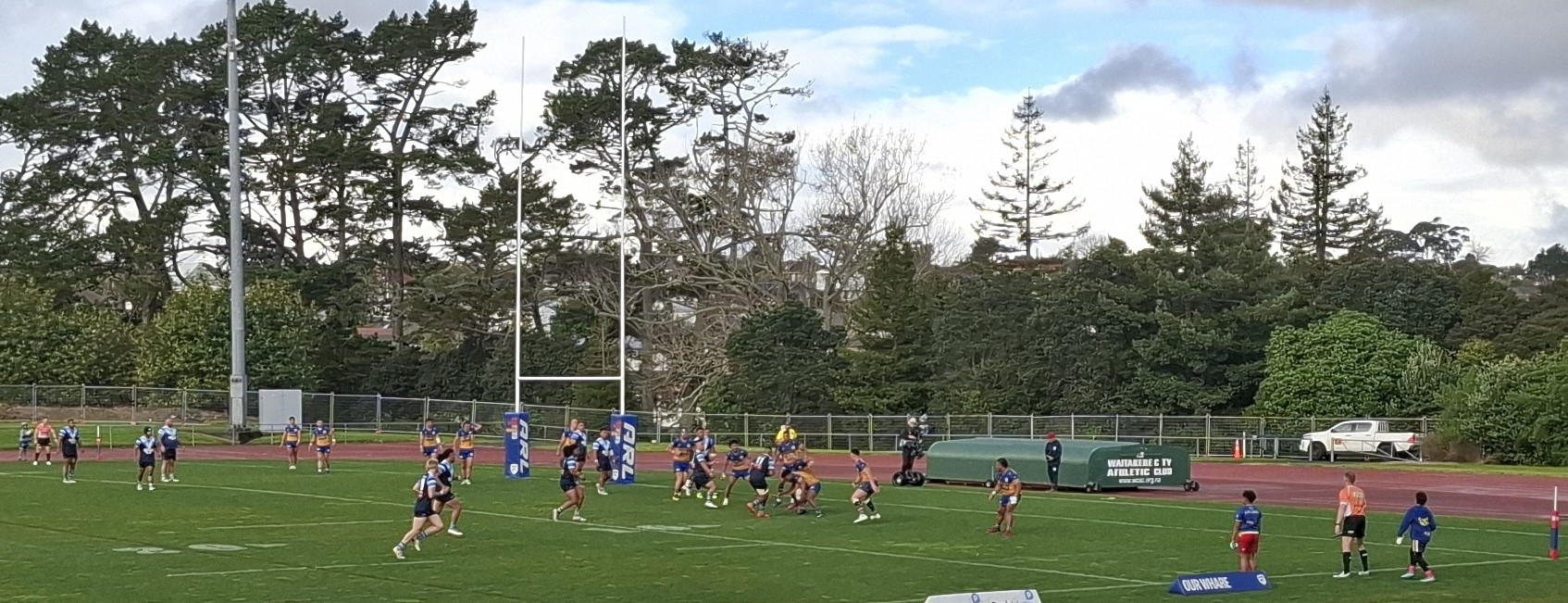
Otahuhu attacking in the first half.

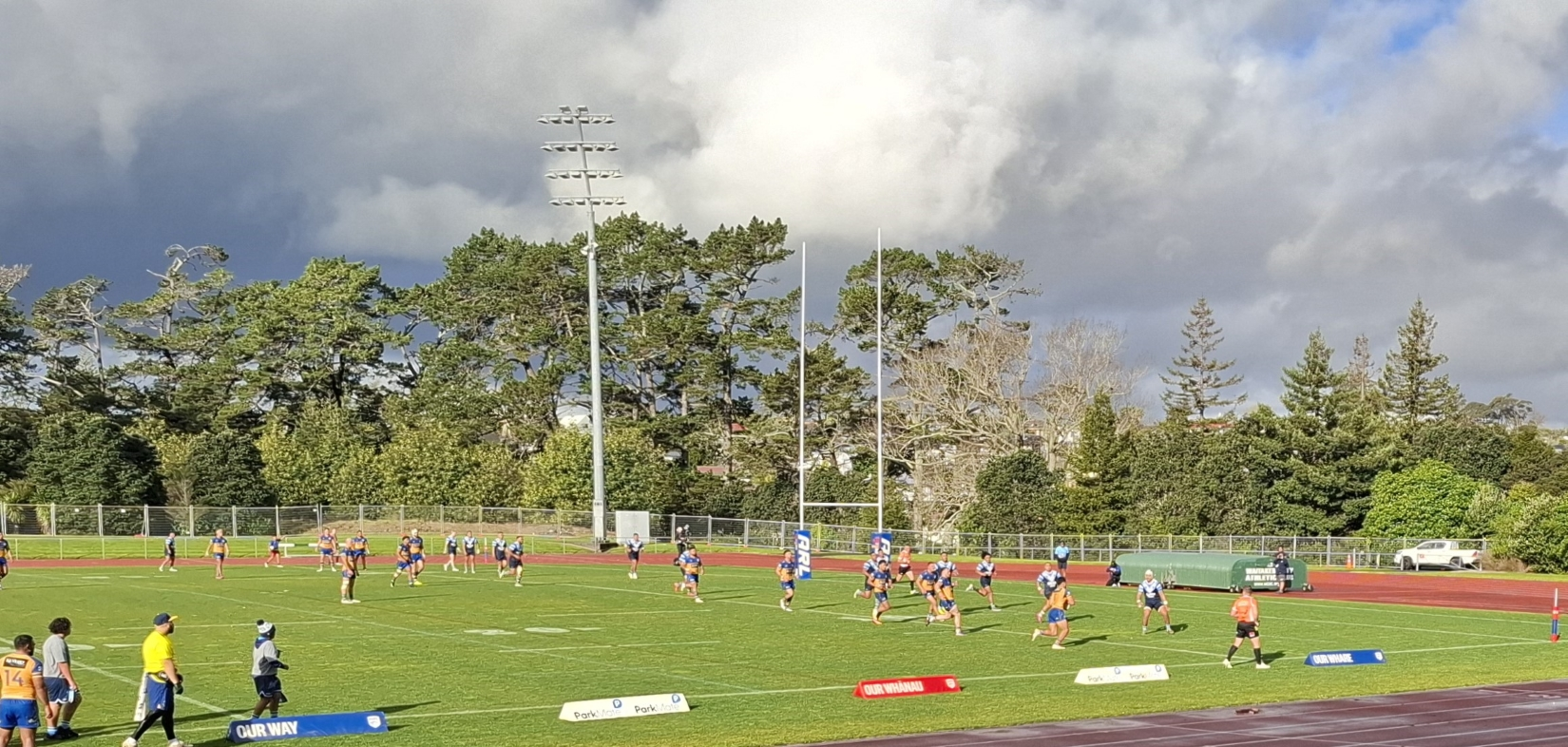
Mt Albert winger Kalepo Paualaisa on the last tackle during the second half.

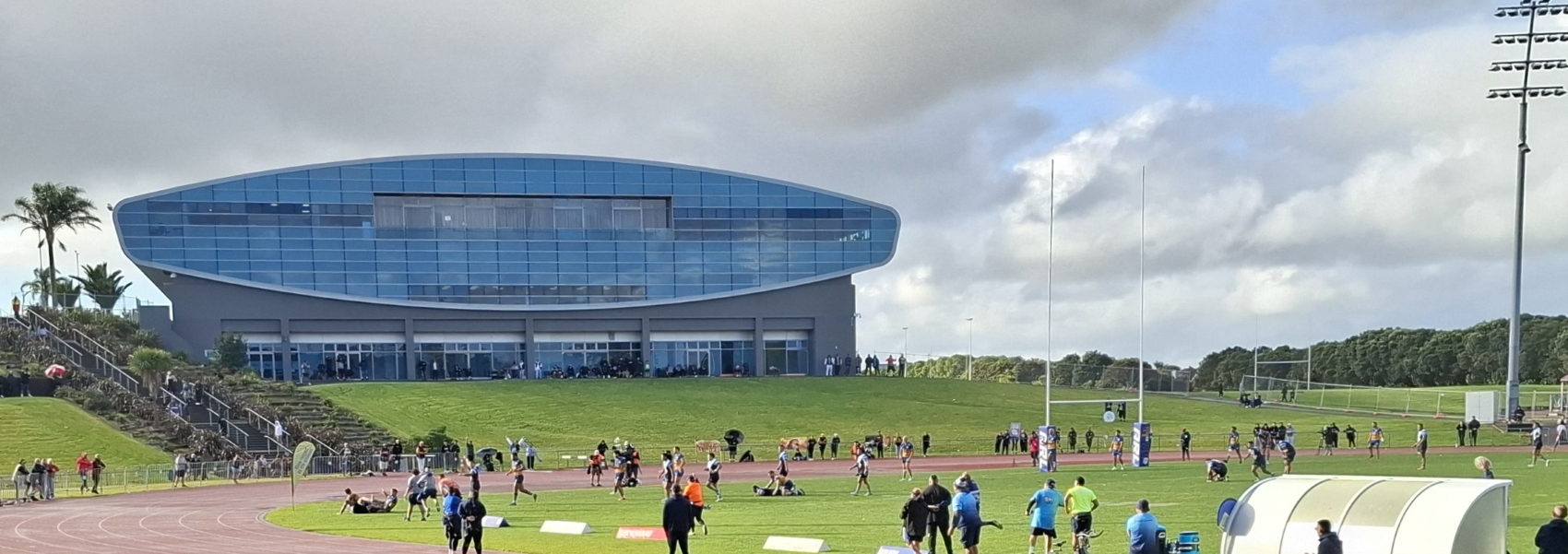
Emeliano Mikaele scoring Otahuhu's first try.

The grand final was played in West Auckland at the Trusts Arena on Sunday, August 17 in fine weather though the field was slippery with earlier rain. Otahuhu won a tightly contests match 8-4 with two second half tries to brothers Emeliano Mikaele and Tevita Mikaele. Mt Albert scored the only points of the first half when Navajo Doyle kicked a 33rd minute penalty. He doubled their lead ten minutes into the second half and when Dion Fraser broke through and passed to Jeremiah Poutu it seemed an upset win was taking shape. However the powerful Otahuhu side gradually took control making strong carries and dominating field position in the last 25 minutes forcing errors and repeat sets from Mt Albert. They came close to scoring several times before Emeliano Mikaele scored following a 60 metre run by Toaiti Ramsey before two tackles later they attacked the left edge with Sebastine Ikihihifo offloading in a tackle to William Fakatoumafi who put Mikaele over in the left corner. Toaiti Ramsey made another break running for 30 metres after breaking through the centre. Then Otahuhu forced an error from the following Mt Albert set ten metres out from their line and after shifting the ball across field Tevita Mikaele crashed through the tackle of Thompson Karena to plant the ball just inside the right corner. Ramsey made several threatening runs and Andrew Nansen was a constant threat at fullback for the Leopards. The Man of the Match was Sebastine Ikahihifo who carried strongly and offloaded several times including the crucial one for their first try. The match was live streamed on the Auckland Rugby League YouTube channel.

17 August	Otahuhu	8-4 (0-2)	Mt Albert	Trusts Arena 1, Henderson
2:45	Try: Emeliano Mikaele (57m), Tevita Mikaele (64m); Con: William Fakataumafi 0/1, Bostyn Hakaraia 0/1		Pen: Navajo Doyle 2/2 (33m, 50m)	Attendance: 1,000; Referee: Paki Parkinson, TJ's: Anthony Eliott and Chris McMillan

=== Full season top try scorers and point scorers ===
The full season point scoring and tries is from the 3 Fox qualifying games and the regular season, and then playoff games for the Fox Memorial Premiership. Several games did not have points entered into the ARL online database while some matches had individual point scorers unnamed and some scoring entries may be erroneous so the scoring is unofficial and incomplete though for the most part an accurate representation of the leading scorers. William Fakatoumafi of Otahuhu was the run away point scoring leader, while his team mates also dominated the try scoring standings with Tevita Mikaele scoring 15 and Phoenix Hunt, Andrew Nansen, and Toaiti Ramsey scoring 14 each. Last years leading scorer Kahn Munokoa scored 14 also for Manukau.

==== Full season top point scorers ====
Top point scorers
No	Player	Team	T	C	P	DG	Pts
1	William Fakatoumafi	Otahuhu	8	66	3	1	171
2	Fred (Leti) Muller	Manukau	4	53	4	1	131
3	Joshua Tanielu	Bay Roskill	9	44	2	0	128
4	James Dowie	Papakura	6	34	3	0	98
5	Navajo Doyle	Mt Albert	2	31	4	0	78
6	Doux Kauhiva	Marist	5	25	0	0	70
7=	Tevita Mikaele	Otahuhu	15	4	0	0	68
7=	Bostyn Hakaraia	Otahuhu	5	24	0	0	68
9	Trujon Nomani-Brown	Richmond	5	22	0	0	64
10	Dion Fraser	Manukau	5	20	0	0	60

==== Full season top try scorers ====
Top try scorers
No	Player	Team	Tries
1	Tevita Mikaele	Otahuhu	15
2=	Phoenix Hunt	Otahuhu	14
2=	Kahn Munokoa	Manukau	14
2=	Andrew Nansen	Otahuhu	14
2=	Toaiti Ramsey	Otahuhu	14
6	Taunga Arama	Manukau	13
7	Lani Graham-Taufa	Marist	10
8=	Walter Fifita	Papakura	9
8=	Jeremiah Poutu	Mt Albert	9
8=	Timor Williams	Mt Albert	9

=== Steele Shanks Women's Premiership ===
==== Standings ====
Team	Pld	W	D	L	B	F	A	PD	Pts
Papakura Women	8	7	0	1	2	292	102	+190	18
Otahuhu Leopards Ladies	8	7	0	1	2	222	108	+114	18
Mount Albert Lionesses	8	4	0	4	2	250	126	+124	12
Mangere Lady Hawks	8	2	0	6	2	152	256	-104	8
Marist Ladies	8	0	0	8	2	62	386	-324	4

==== Fixtures and Results ====
===== Round 1 =====
The Mt Albert Lionesses easily beat the new Mangere East Lady Hawks side at Cornwall Park 2. Anastasia Sekene scored three tries, and Lua Hakofa and Jade Tuilaepa both scored doubles for the winners. Paulina Morris-Ponga converted eight of their ten tries. In an even match on the Cornwall Park 1 field the reigning champion Papakura Sea Eagles held on for a 6 point win after leading 20-0 midway through the first half. Former New Zealand Warriors and New Zealand women's player Amber-Jessie Kani scored a try for the Sea Eagles. The match was live streamed on the Auckland Rugby League You Tube channel.

10 May	Mangere East Lady Hawks	4-56	Mt Albert Lionesses	Cornwall Park 2
2:30	Try: Unknown (26m)		Try: Lua Hakofa 2 (1m, 71m), Anastasia Sekene 3 (5m, 18m, 68m), Dysharne Pepe (10m), Aleisha Taylor (43m), Jade Tuilaepa 2 (46m, 74m), Keri Ratima (51m); Con: Paulina Morris-Ponga 8/10 (2m, 6m, 11m, 19m, 44m, 47m, 69m, 72m)	Referee: Nigel Williams (TJ's: ?)

10 May	Papakura Sea Eagles Women	20-14	Otahuhu Leopards Ladies	Cornwall Park 1
2:30	Try: Ana Taumalolo (5m), Amber-Jessie Kani (15m), Wati Delailomaloma (22m), Fresia Pokaia (28m); Con: Platinum Marsters 2/4 (16m, 29m)		Try: Oceaniah Leiataua (38m), Taylor Osborne (69m), Jeyla Ropati (76m); Con: Tiana Thomson 1/3 (39m)	Referee: David Millar (TJ's: Moses luke Ripia and ?)

===== Round 2 =====
17 May	Mangere Lady Hawks	18-42	Papakura Women	Walter Massey Park 1
2:30	Try: Tiare-Anne Leauga 2 (28m, 65m); Con: Cleo Leilua (80m)		Try: Unknown all points	Referee: Kone Jr Vaiuta Lavea

17 May	Otahuhu Leopards Ladies	52-4	Marist Saints	Bert Henham Park 1
2:30	Try: Unknown all points		Try: Unknown	Referee: Nigel Williams

===== Round 3 =====
At Fowlds Park the Lionesses scored an easy win. They led 28-10 at halftime before easing out to a 38 point win. Patisepa Kengike scored a hat-trick and Anastasia Sekene getting a double. Palina Morris-Ponga converted six of their tries. There were thirteen tries scored at Walter Massey Park though only one was converted (by Tiana Thompson). For the visiting 'Leopards Ladies' they had nine different try scorers making up their 36 points while for the 'Lady Hawks' Kalonikakala Fifita scored a second half double.

24 May	Mt Albert Lionesses	54-16 (28-10)	Marist Women	Fowlds Park 2
12:45	Try: Patisepa Kengike 3 (4m, 10m, 58m), Anastasia Sekene 2 (14m, 63m), Alice Shannon (24m), Jade Tuilaepa (27m), Mele Feaomoengalu (42m), Aleisha Taylor (52m), Keri Ratima (74m); Con: Paulina Morris-Ponga 6 (6m, 15m, 25m, 28m, 43m, 54m), Aleisha Taylor (65m)		Try: Navelzen Taupo (21m), Meletatafu Lelenoa (33m), Ella Timo (70m); Con: Ella Timo (22m); Pen: Mikayla Kalolo	Referee: David Millar

24 May	Mangere Lady Hawks	16-38 (0-8)	Otahuhu Leopards Ladies	Walter Massey Park 1
2:30	Try: Tiare-Anne Leauga (45m), Kalonikakala Fifita 2 (70m, 80m), Odesza Toia-Alaimalo (76m)		Try: Tiana Thompson (4m), Oceaniah Leiataua (8m), Tuputala Ufioa (45m), Jade Wharemate (48m), Charlize Cairns (56m), Lourdes Tuiala (67m), Jeyla Ropati (70m), Jasmin Munro (76m), Monika Fakaosilea (77m); Con: Tiana Thompson (69m)	Referee: Kone Lavea

===== Round 4 =====
Otahuhu scored three unconverted tries to Jasmin Munro, Georgia Wharton-Benedict, and Jeyla Ropati to take a 12-0 halftime lead before a Mt Albert comeback saw them get it to 12-10 in the 73rd minute when Anastasia Sekene scored. The conversion missed and Otahuhu held on for the win. Shonte To'a scored three tries for Papakura in their easy win over Marist with Tiana-Malia Kawaihoa-Marquez crossing for two tries. Platinum Marsters converted five of their ten tries.

7 June	Otahuhu Leopards Ladies	12-10 (12-0)	Mt Albert Lionesses	Bert Henham Park 1
2:30	Try: Jasmin Munro (9m), Georgia Wharton-Benedict (25m), Jeyla Ropati (35m)		Try: Mele Feaomoengalu (60m), Anastasia Sekene (73m); Con: Paulina Morris-Ponga (61m)	Referee: David Millar

7 June	Papakura Women	50-6 (26-6)	Marist Women	Prince Edward Park 1
2:30	Try: Shonte To'a 3 (2m, 45m, 72m), Wati Delailomaloma (9m), Alexis Hapuku (13m), Amber-Jessie Kani (20m), Tiana-Malia Kawaihoa-Marquez 2 (26m, 49m), Queenie E Wai Tupaea (61m), Danika Manase (67m); Con: Platinum Marsters (3m, 10m, 27m, 45m, 63m)		Try: Leila Afu (35m); Con: Sela Moala (40m)	Referee: Rebecca Ellison

===== Round 5 =====
Mt Albert Lionesses took a 28-6 lead into halftime before a big comeback by Pt Chevalier who scored four unvconverted tries but ultimately falling ten points short. For the Lionesses Pamela McHardy scored a try and kicked four conversions. At McManus Park, Onjeurlina Hunt scored a double for the Leopards including one in the 76th minute which levelled the scores with Tiana Thomson's conversion proving the winner. For Papakura, Ana Taumalolo and Shania Berryman scored two tries each but Platinum Marsters was only able to convert one of them and all 18 of their points came in the first half.

14 June	Mt Albert Lionesses	32-22 (28-6)	Mangere Lady Hawks	Fowlds Park 1
2:30	Try: Jewel Bowen (7m), Alice Shannon (12m), Patisepa Kengike (17m), Pamela McHardy (23m), Lua Hafoka (34m), Mafi Faukafa (52m); Con: Aleisha Taylor 4/6 (8m, 14m, 25m, 36m)		Try: Unknown (27m), Unknown (45m), Unknown (49m), Unknown (62m), Unknown (68m); Con: Unknown (29m)	Referee: Nigel Williams

14 June	Otahuhu Ladies	20-18 (8-18)	Papakura Women	McManus Park 1
2:30	Try: Onjeurlina Hunt 2 (24m, 76m), Jasmin Munro (28m), Oceaniah Leiataua (48m); Con: Tiana Thomson (77m); Pen: Tiana Thomson (50m)		Try: Ana Taumalolo 2 (1m, 5m), Shania Berryman 2 (16m, 22m); Con: Platinum Marsters (2m)	Referee: David Millar

===== Round 6 =====
In the only round 6 match to be played the Otahuhu Leopards Ladies won a hard fought game against the winless Mangere East Lady Hawks. They led 24-8 soon after halftime but the Lady Hawks scored two tries to one to make the score respectable.For Otahuhu Jasmin Munro scored twice while Tiana Thomson crossed for a try and kicked two conversions. For the Lady Hawks Tiare-Anne Leauga scored a double.

28 June	Marist	LBD-WBD	Mt Albert Lionesses	Margaret Griffin Park 1
2:30

28 June	Otahuhu Leopards Ladies	28-18 (20-8)	Mangere East Lady Hawks	McManus Park 1
2:30	Try: Lourdes Tuiala (1m), Jor-El Loto (6m), Jasmin Munro 2 (16m, 30m), Tiana Thomson (43m), Savannah Bacchus (69m); Con: Tiana Thomson 2 (3m, 8m)		Try: Tiare-Anne Leauga 2 (26m, 74m), Alyssa Vaha'akolo-Ngaika (35m), Shafenior Fealofani Lui (56m); Con: Ramouner Serenity Henry (57m)	Referee: Hemana Ryan

===== Round 7 =====
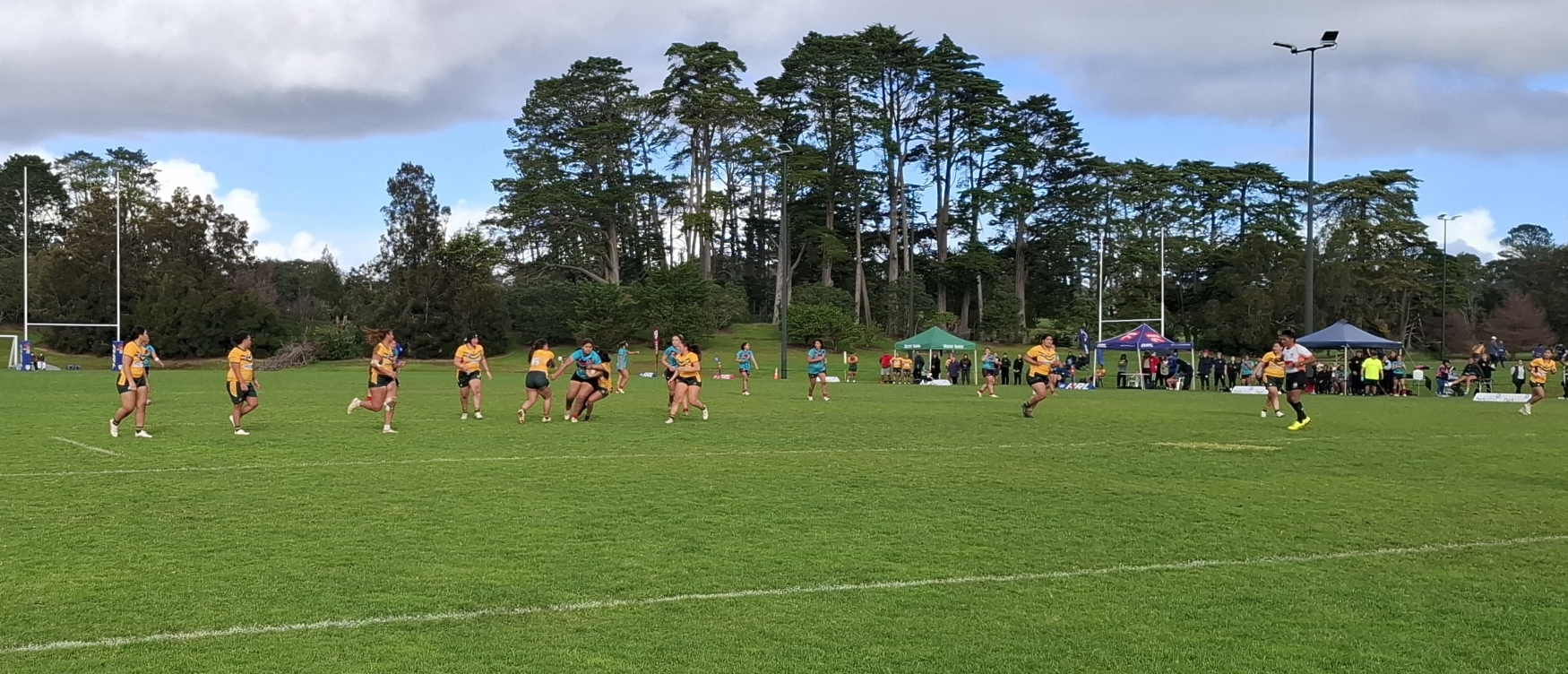
Tiani Fakauho carrying for the Mangere East Lady Hawks during the second half at Margaret Griffen Park in Mt Roskill.

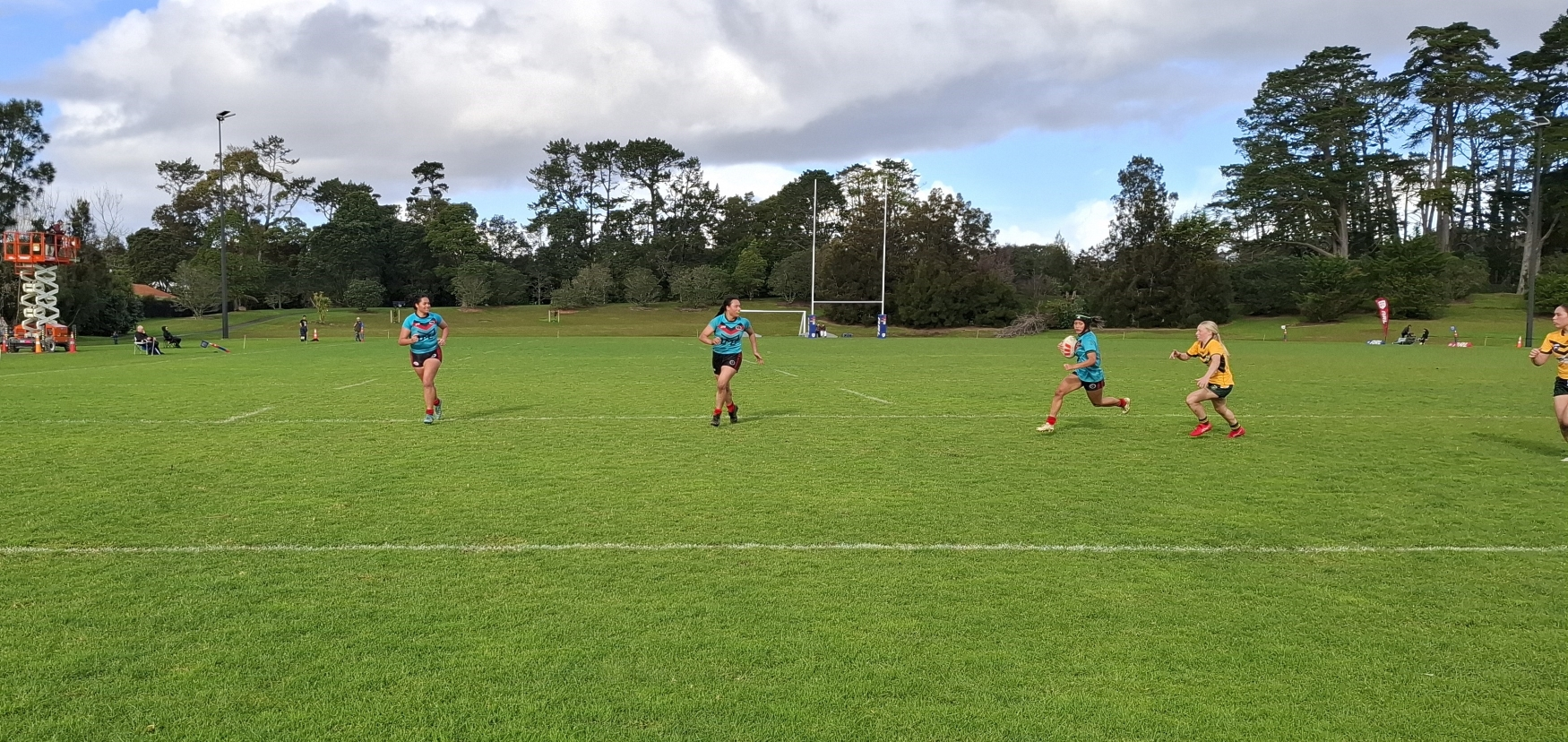
Tiare-Anne Leauga scoring her 4th try for the Lady Hawks.

In the ARL livestreamed match at Margaret Griffen Park in Mt Roskill the visiting Mangere East Lady Hawks were too strong for Marist. The match commentators were Lynley Tierney-Mani, Nigel Rattray, and Jono Ngan Woo. The game had been transferred from Murray Halberg Park after the recent wet weather. Tiare-Anne Leauga crossed twice in each half for four tries. Her first came in the second minute when she used her speed from 30 metres out to cross in the left corner. Five minutes later she took a pass 65 metres out breaking down the left before beating the Marist fullback Ella Timo to score behind the posts. Lupe Finau replied for Marist after a movement to the right and she dived over in a tackle in the right corner. At the break the score was 24-8 but immediately Leauga scored a 50 metre try cutting through the middle and scoring behind the posts. Navelzen Taupo used her power to crash over in the 51st minute which was her second try for the Saints. Ella Timo was sinbinned by referee Nigel Williams after a sideline push and shove with ten minutes to go. Latesha Mitchener scored a try and kicked three conversions. The Lady Hawks win was their first of the season and saw them move past Marist off the bottom of the standings. At Fowlds Park the Lionesses led 16-6 at halftime after tries to Anastasia Sekene, Paulina Morris-Ponga, and Claudia Hanham however Papakura took over the game after the break running in four converted tries and holding the Lionesses scoreless. With the win Papakura moved to the top of the standings with the previous leaders the Lionesses dropping down to third.

5 July	Marist Women	12-44 (8-24)	Mangere East Lady Hawks	Margaret Griffen Park 1, Mt Roskill
12:45	Try: Lupe Finau (16m), Navelzen Taupo 2 (32m, 51m); Con: Ella Timo 0/3		Try: Tiare-Anne Leauga 4 (2m, 6m, 42m, 78m), Stormy-Lee Sanft (23m), Kalonikakala Fifita (35m), Latesha Mitchener (39), Mele Kaufusi (56m), Gedaliah Pulupaki (64m); Con: May-Lepetimalo Fueina Sasa 1/1 (7m), Latesha Mitchener 3/8 (40m, 43m, 58m)	Referee: Nigel Williams

5 July	Mt Albert Lionesses	16-30 (16-6)	Papakura Women	Fowlds Park 1, Morningside
2:30	Try: Anastasia Sekene (11m), Paulina Morris-Ponga (26m), Claudia Hanham (36m); Con: Paulina Morris-Ponga (13m, 27m)		Try: Unknown (4m), Unknown (44m), Unknown (47m), Unknown (53m), Unknown (79m); Con: Unknown (5m, 44m, 48m, 67m), Platinum Marsters (80m)	Referee: Simon Bailey

===== Round 8 =====
12 July	Marist Women	8-42 (4-20)	Otahuhu Leopards Ladies	Margaret Griffen Park 1, Mt Roskill
12:45	Try: Katie-Lou Horley (26m), Mikayla Kalolo (54m)		Try: Jasmin Munro 2 (2m, 62m), Tiana Thomson (12m), Onjeurlina Hunt 3 (18m, 49m, 73m), Savannah Bacchus (33m), Georgia Wharton-Benedict (79m); Con: Tiana Thomson 2 (14m, 19m), Lourdes Tuiala 3 (50m, 75m, 80m)

12 July	Papakura Women	38-4 (20-0)	Mangere East Lady Hawks	Opaheke Sports Park 1, Papakura
2:30	Try: Shania Berryman 2 (13m, 34m), Freesia Pokaia (21m), Amber-Jessie Kani (24m), June Westerlund (56m), Wendy Savieti (60m), Daumavia Herewini (68m); Con: Platinum Marsters 5 (22m, 26m, 58m, 62m, 70m)		Try: Shafenior Fealofani (75m)	Referee: Davey Misileki

===== Round 9 =====
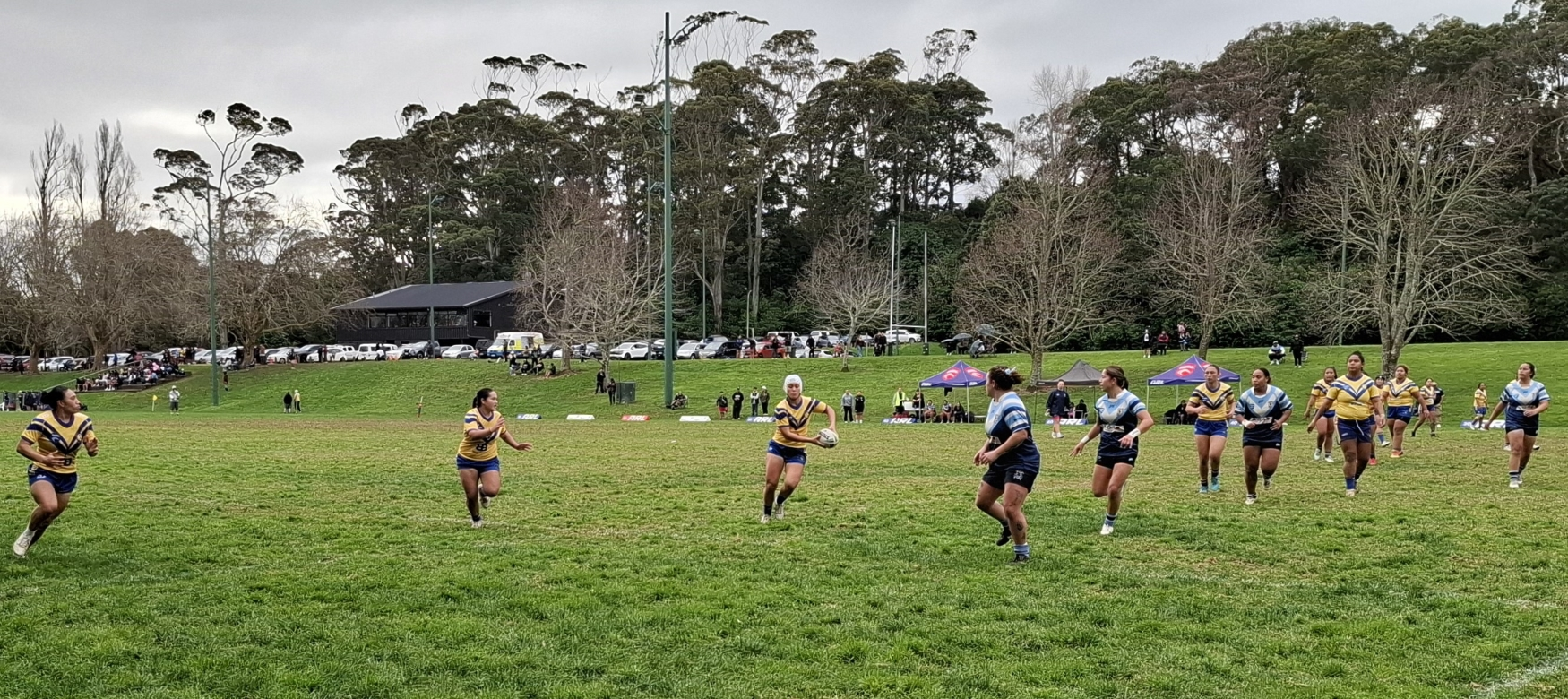
Mt Albert attacking at Fowlds Park.

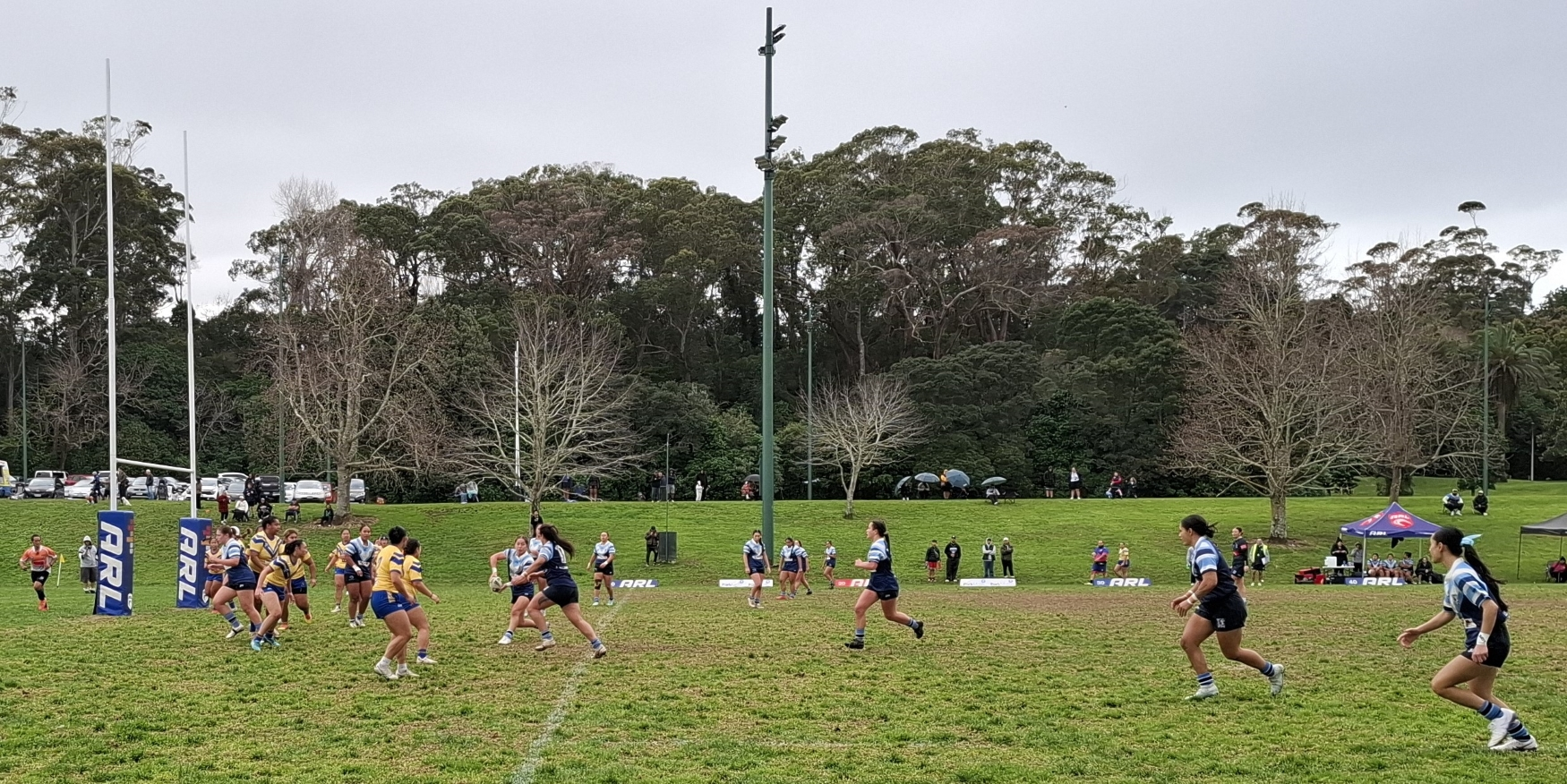
Otahuhu on attack.

In the live streamed match the second placed Otahuhu Leopards Ladies had a narrow win over Mt Albert Lionesses. The Leopards led at halftime 10-4 after tries to Jasmin Munro and Onjeurlina Hunt who crashed over. They extended their lead in the 45th minute when Tiana Thomson scored but then Mt Albert crossed twice through Anastasia Sekene and Alyssa Malamatenios. Paulina Morris-Ponga missed the conversion which would have tied the scores and Otahuhu held on for the win. At Margaret Griffen Park the Papakura side had an easy 68-6 win over Marist. For the winners Danika Manase, Queenie E Wai Putaea, Alexis Hapuku, and Tiana-Malia Kelelii Kawaihoa-Marquez all scored doubles.

19 July	Mt Albert Lionesses	14-16 (4-10)	Otahuhu Ladies	Fowlds Park 2, Morningside
2:15	Try: Keri Ratima (19m), Anastasia Sekene (60m), Alyssa Malamatenios (65m); Con: Jewel Bowen 0/1, Paulina Morris-Ponga 1/2 (62m)		Try: Jasmin Munro (4m), Onjeurlina Hunt (15m), Tiana Thomson (45m); Con: Lourde Tuiala 2/3 (16m, 47m)	Referee: Hemana Ryan

19 July	Marist Women	6-68 (0-36)	Papakura Women	Margaret Griffen Park 1, Mt Roskill
2:30	Try: Fusilua Sefo (49m); Con: Sela Moala (50m)		Try: Daumavia Herewini (1m), Danika Manase 2 (3m, 52m), Queenie E Wai Putaea 2 (7m, 72m), Wendy Savieti (21m), Alexis Hapuku 2 (28m, 38m), Wati Deleilomaloma (32m), Tiana-Malia Kelelii Kawaihoa-Marquez 2 (42m, 68m), Trinity Crosby (57m), Honor Wilson (79m); Con: Platinum Marsters 4 (2m, 5m, 30m, 80m), Fresia Pokaia 4 (23m, 54m, 59m, 69m)	Referee: John Sekene

===== Round 10 =====
26 July	Papakura Women	26-18 (10-4)	Mt Albert Lionesses	Opaheke Sports Park 1, Papakura
2:30	Try: Queenie E Wai Tupaea (11m), Danika Manase (22m), Freesia Pokaia (48m), Tiana-Malia Kawaihoa-Marquez (63m), Amber-Jessie Kani (73m); Con: Platinum Marsters 3 (12m, 49m, 75m)		Try: Jewel Bowen 2 (35m, 42m), Patisepa Kengike (55m), Paulina Morris-Ponga (68m); Con: Paulina Morris-Ponga (43m)	Referee: Nigel Williams

26 July	Mangere East Lady Hawks	26-10 (16-0)	Marist Women	Walter Massey Park 1, Māngere
2:30	Try: May-Lepetimalo Fueina Sasa (9m), Cleo Leilua (16m), Siulolovao Tauhalaliku (31m), Alyssa Vaha'akolo-Ngaika (44m), Elisapeta Gale (76m); Con: Latesha Mitchener 3 (10m, 32m, 45m)		Try: Briarn Fortress (66m), Kafo'atu Filo (70m); Con: Sela Moala (71m)	Referee: Davey Misileki

==== Playoffs ====
===== Preliminary Final =====
2 August	Papakura Women	28-14 (20-4)	Otahuhu Leopards Ladies	Prince Edward Park 1, Papakura
12:45	Try: Tiana-Malia Kawaihoa-Marquez 2 (19m, 34m), Queenie E Wai Tupaea (23m), Shonte To'a 2 (28m, 40m); Con: Platinum Marsters 2 (25m, 29m); Pen: Platinum Marsters 2 (69m, 80m)		Try: Jasmin Munro (14m), Monika Fakaosilea (57m), Jeyla Ropati (70m); Con: Tiana Thomson (59m)	Referee: Nigel Williams, TJ's: Davey Misileki and Corey Jull

===== Minor Semi-Final =====
2 August	Mt Albert Lionesses	28-16 (6-8)	Mangere East Lady Hawks	Fowlds Park 1, Morningside
2:30	Try: Anastasia Sekene 3 (27m, 44m, 71m), Jewel Bowen (60m), Claudia Hanham (67m), Paulina Morris-Ponga (78m); Con: Aleisha Taylor (29m), Alyssa Malamatenios (79m)		Try: Unknown (7m), Unknown (18m), Unknown (48m), Unknown (57m)	Referee: David Millar, TJ's: Oliver Broadhead and Paul Lorigan

===== Major Semi-Final =====
The Mt Albert Lionesses scored an upset win in the major semi-final to make the grand final. The scores were tied 8-8 at halftime following tries to Jasmin Munro and Lourdes Tuiala for Otahuhu and Patisepa Kengike and Anatasia Sekene for the Lionesses. The Lionesses then took control of the game with they scored two tries which Hanae Vito-Toleafoa converted for a 20-8 lead with 15 minutes remaining. A converted try to Jasmin Munro gave the Leopards a chance before Paulina Morris-Onga sealed the win when she crossed in the 74th minute with Vito-Toleafoa kicking her third conversion.

9 August	Otahuhu Leopards Ladies	14-26 (8-8)	Mt Albert Lionesses	Bert Henham Park 1, Otahuhu
12:45	Try: Jasmin Munro (13m, 69m), Lourdes Tuiala (34m); Con: Tiana Thomson (71m)		Try: Patisepa Kengike (19m), Anatasia Sekene (29m, 63m), Alice Shannon (55m), Paulina Morris-Ponga (74m); Con: Hanae Vito-Toleafoa (56m, 64, 75m)	Referee: Brent Newton, TJ's: David Millar and Taura Taura

===== Steele-Shanks Cup Grand Final =====
The grand final was played in West Auckland at the Trusts Arena on Sunday, August 17. Mt Albert Lionesses opened the scoring when Jade Tuilaepa broke through and ran away to score close to the posts however Papakura then totally dominated the next 40 minutes running in five tries led by loose forward Shonte To'a who carried strongly and broke several tackles. Their first was to captain Amber Kani. Ana Taumalolo crashed over for three quick tries following breaks down field. At 26-6 early in the second half following a try to Danika Manase the game looked finished as a contest but Mt Albert scored two converted tries to Anatasia Sekene and Mafi Faukafa saw the lead narrowed to eight points. Sekene's first came after a 70 metre run where she beat multiple defenders. Papakura scored a converted try in the 64th minute to Jodeci Joseph who ran out of dummy half and crashed over, and Mt Albert then replied with a consolation to Sekene with 6 minutes to go who this time ran 80 metres to score. The Sea Eagles then closed the game out for their second straight title. The match was live streamed on the Auckland Rugby League YouTube channel.

17 August	Papakura	32-24 (22-6)	Mt Albert Lionesses	Trusts Arena 1, Henderson
12:15	Try: Amber Kani (10m), Ana Taumalolo 3 (18m, 21m, 28m), Danika Manase (45m), Jodeci Joseph (64m); Con: Platinum Marsters 4/6 (19m, 23m, 29m, 68m)		Try: Jade Tuilaepa (7m), Anatasia Sekene 2 (53m, 73m), Mafi Faukafa (58m); Con: Hanae Vito-Toleafoa 4/4 (8m, 54m, 60m, 75m)	Referee: David Millar, TJ's: Tameilau Pauuvale and Nigel Williams

=== Sharman Cup ===
==== Standings ====
The Mt Albert side withdrew from the competition after two default losses midseason forcing a bye for their remaining opponents who were awarded two competition points.

Team	Pld	W	D	L	B	F	A	PD	Pts
Hibiscus Coast	11	11	0	0	0	621	80	+541	22
Northcote Tigers	11	9	0	2	0	358	207	+151	18
Otara Scorpions	10	7	0	3	1	394	144	+250	16
Manurewa Marlins	11	7	0	4	0	352	199	+153	14
Mangere East Hawks	10	6	0	4	1	336	222	+114	14
Howick Hornets	10	6	0	3	1	301	212	+89	14
Glenora Bears	11	3	0	8	0	160	546	-386	6
Pakuranga Jaguars	10	0	1	9	1	136	436	-300	3
Waitemata Seagulls	10	0	1	9	1	102	478	-376	3
Mount Albert 2nds	6	0	0	6	0	26	262	-236	0

==== Fixtures and Results ====
===== Round 1 =====
3 May	Mt Albert 2nds	8-34	Otara	Fowlds Park 1
2:30	Try: Kulima Tafea (79m); Con: Carlos Muru (80m)		Try: Titanian Palei 3 (8m, 48m, 56m), Filipo Utai 3 (29m, 39m, 59m), Kurtis Cooper (71m); Con: Titanian Palei 2 (10m, 39m), Jody Henry (58m)	Referee: [Match Manager: Neil Petaia]

3 May	Mangere East	46-16	Glenora	Walter Massey Park 1
2:30	Try: Joshua Halatanu (1m), Siale Lavuavu 3 (20m, 51m, 66m), Numiamasasulu Tema (31m), Nukurua Ngere (60m), John Paulo (64m), Lenin Simi (76m), Townsend Unaga (78m); Con: Numiamasasulu Tema 2 (2m, 20m), Howard Brown 3 (53m, 61m, 64m)		Try: Arona Tyrell (7m), Sunia Tamale (33m), Bronson Bernard (48m); Con: Noah Connolly (9m, 34m)

3 May	Pakuranga	10-58	Manurewa	Ti Rakau Park 1
2:30	Try: Elijah Fatuleai (56m), PJ Nauma (12m); Con: Anaru Thomson (58m)		Try: Te Rata Hikatangatahiko (7m), Elijah Solomona 2 (17m, 70m), Josiah Andrew (21m), Jayson Losefo (29m), Tamati Hebden (33m), Bodhi Hape (42m), Charlie Archer (48m), Sorro Malaesilia (52m), Josiah Andrew (61m), Daniel Du Plessis (66m), Jeremiah Tamatimu (78m); Con: Hauriri Harvey (19m, 31m, 54m, 72m, 80m)

3 May	Waitemata	10-52	Hibiscus Coast	Ranui Domain 1
2:30	Try: Unknown (39m), Tony Setu (62m); Con: Sevele Fainu (39m)		Try: Nathan Natano 2 (3m, 28m), Korey Craig 4 (5m, 6m, 25m, 80m), Jeremiah Pai (43m), Nathan Ashe (57m), Samuel Waterworth (69m), Te Awa Marino (75m); Con: Notana Snowden 6/10 (4m, 6m, 8m, 26m, 58m, 80m)

3 May	Northcote	28-18	Howick	Birkenhead War Memorial 4
2:30	Try: Strachan Vowles (9m), Huston Holloway 2 (11m, 59m), Kevin Locke (22m), Teremate Teremate (66m); Con: Tait Wenzlick (10m, 12m, 23m, 60m)		Try: Xander Mahu-Delamere (15m), Jaz Nahu-Main (27m), Joshua Setefano (73m); Con: Mason Te Rore 3/3 (16m, 28m, 74m)

===== Round 2 =====
The match between Mangere East and Otara was recorded for You Tube by G2G Productions.

10 May	Mangere East	22-42 (18-20)	Otara	Walter Massey Park 1
2:30				Referee: Brent Newton

10 May	Pakuranga	10-32	Northcote	Ti Rakau Park 1
2:30				Referee: Gabriel Thompson

10 May	Waitemata	12-26	Manurewa	Ranui Domain 1
2:30				Referee: Ngaone Sefo

10 May	Hibiscus Coast	66-0	Mt Albert 2nds	Stanmore Bay 2
2:30	Try: Taine Ryan 2 (1m, 79m), Max Fuller (3m), Kavana Te Kiri-Ryan (13m), Korey Craig 2 (20m, 77m), Te Awa Marino (36m), Samuel Waterworth (39m), Nathan Natano 2 (46m, 68m), Nathan Ashe (51m), Metui Kalekale (55m), Nathan Austen (74m); Con: Notana Snowden (3m), Tipene Snowden 4 (21m, 39m, 47m, 53m), Korey Craig (80m)			Referee: Jordan Chand

10 May	Howick	40-18	Glenora	Paparoa Park 1
2:30				Referee: Mina Nomani

===== Round 3 =====
17 May	Otara	74-4 (32-4)	Glenora	Ngati Otara Park 1
2:30	Try: Manaia Lauaki 3 (3m, 37m, 54m), Peyrce Tanaki (13m), Filipo Utai 2 (19m, 41m), Kurtis Cooper 2 (22m, 64m), Titanian Palei 3 (33m, 45m, 68m), Rico Toeava Ward (56m), Hansell Semau (60m), Raiden Siafolau (71m); Con: Titanian Palei 7 (14m, 20m, 35m, 38m, 43m, 61m, 66m), Kurtis Cooper 2 (55m, 58m)		Try: Independence Anetone (27m)	Referee: Gabriel Thompson

17 May	Howick	20-28 (6-16)	Hibiscus Coast	Paparoa Park 1
2:30	Try: Jarius Malu-Delamere (29m), Mason Te Rore 2 (47m, 73m), Paula Fukofuka (64m); Con: Joshua Setefano (30, 65m)		Try: Kavana Te Kiri-Ryan 2 (4m, 58m), George Prescott (9m), Korey Craig (15m), Cody Jones (68m); Con: Notana Snowden 3/5 (5m, 17m, 69m); Pen: Notana Snowden 1/1 (80m)	Referee: Keven Ah-Ken

17 May	Mt Albert	10-22 (4-6)	Manurewa	Fowlds Park 1
2:30	Try: Antonio Fruean (35m), Cole Hughes (76m); Con: Carlos Muru (77m)		Try: Jeremiah Margraff 3 (8m, 54m, 62m), Jeremiah Tamatimu (70m); Con: Nathan Simmons 3/4 (9m, 62m, 71m)	Referee: David Millar

17 May	Waitemata	20-32 (8-16)	Northcote	Ranui Domain 1
2:30	Try: Unknown (1m), Unknown (11m), Unknown (45m), Roy Siovaiata (50m), Unknown (53m)		Try: Ethan Schaumkel 2 (20m, 73m), Dante Nu'u 2 (26m, 77m), Jason Bhana (36m), Huston Holloway (61m); Con: James Bates 4/6 (21m, 36m, 61m, 78m)	Referee: Mina Nomani

17 May	Pakuranga	6-36	Mangere East	Ti Rakau Park 1
2:30	Try: Joshua Cooper (39m); Con: John Fitzgerald (39m)		Try: Nukurua Ngere (21m), Joshua Halatanu (25m), Semisi Tuipulotu (43m), Numiamasasulu Tema (47m), Jasiah Vaiouga (57m), Lemalie Seiuli (65m), Siale Lavulavu (77m); Con: Numiamasasulu Tema 3 (21m, 43m, 47m), Howard Brown (80m)	Referee: Brent Newton

===== Round 4 =====
Glenora's struggles continued losing 54-12 at home. Lemalie Seiuli and Siale Lavulavu both scored three tries for the Hawks. At Birkenhead War Memorial Northcote won 52-22 over Pakuranga with Vinnie Chan running in four tries through the middle section of the game and James Bates converting eight of their nine tries. Johnathan Kusimweray crossed twice for the Jaguars. On Jack Shelly Field the Manurewa side ran away with a 58-4 win after the scores were 16-4 at halftime. Elijah Solomona scored a second half hat-trick with Tyson Slade scoring twice and Nathan Simmons adding five conversions to his try for the Marlins. Waitemata's only try was scored by Roy Meki Siovaiata. At Ngati Ōtara Park the Scorpions burst out to a 24-0 half time lead thanks to four long range tries between the 9th and 21st minutes, and by the end of the game captain Filipo Utai (3), Kurtis Cooper (2), and Atelea Filo (2) had all crossed multiple times. Howick's points came after the break with Mason Te Rore and Lopingi Lama scoring one try each. The match was recorded for You Tube by G2G Productions.

24 May	Glenora	12-54 (4-30)	Mangere East	Harold Moody 1
2:30	Try: Sione Ma'asi (14m), Bronson Bernard (64m), Tevita Misiloi (70m)		Try: Lemalie Seiuli 3 (6m, 17m, 25m), Agapeo Ah-Young (28m), Siale Lavulavu 3 (34m, 42m, 47m), Lamonye Matu (39m), Malachi Vaiouga (59m), Texas Toleafoa (75m); Con: Christian Sifakula (7m, 29m, 35m, 44m, 49m, 60m), Michael Munday (76m)	Referee: Mina Nomani

24 May	Northcote	52-22 (28-8)	Pakuranga	Birkenhead War Memorial Park 4
2:30	Try: Taine Neho (17m), Ethan Schaumkel (19m), Vinnie Chan 4 (23m, 37m, 41m, 53m), Tait Wenzlick (34m), Huston Holloway (56m), Jason Bhana (59m); Con: James Bates 8 (17m, 24m, 35m, 38m, 42m, 55m, 57m, 61m)		Try: Fetineiai Aigaalii (13m), Johnathan Kusimweray 2 (27m, 76m), Aigaalii (Lucks) Aigaalii (46m), Unknown (80m); Con: Unknown (48m)	Referee: Brent Newton

24 May	Manurewa	58-4 (16-4)	Waitemata	Mountfort Park: Jack Shelly Field
2:30	Try: Nathan Simmons (7m), Duntaine Puna (32m), Tyson Slade 2 (35m, 72m), Jeremiah Tamatimu (44m), Amerika Uili (48m), Te Rata Hikatangatahiko (53m), Elijah Solomona 3 (60m, 62m, 76m), Nathan Simmons (67m); Con: Nathan Simmons 5 (8m, 33m, 49m, 60m, 67m), Hauriri Harvey (69m), Jeremiah Tamatimu (77m)		Try: Roy Meki Siovaiata (15m)	Referee: Keven Ah-Ken

24 May	Mt Albert	0-80	Hibiscus Coast	Fowlds Park 2
2:30				Referee: David Millar

24 May	Otara	32-8 (24-0)	Howick	Ngati Otara Park 1
2:30	Try: Kurtis Cooper 2 (9m, 71m), Filipo Utai 3 (12m, 18m, 33m), Atelea Filo 2 (21m, 66m); Con: Tino Palei 2/6 (10m, 22m), Kurtis Cooper 0/1		Try: Mason Te Rore (43m), Pingi Lama (52m); Con: Josh Setefano 0/2	Referee: Jack Feavers

===== Round 5 =====
The match between Manurewa and Northcote at Mountfort Park was recorded for You Tube by G2G Productions. Manurewa half Daniel du Plessis slipped through from close to the line and then Jeremiah Tamatimu crashed over to give Manurewa a 10-0 lead. Northcote responded with tries to Tre Stylz Te Awa and Arno Mouton. Manurewa centre Elijah Solomona scored in the right corner to give the home side a 14-12 lead at the half time break. The Tigers however dominated the second half scoring three tries, two of which James Bates converted to go with three other goals to make the score comfortable. Otara beat Pakuranga 62-14 and after the game in an interview with the Counties Sports Hub the Otara coach Willie Maea said "we needed to put in a strong effort as the bye weekend can sometimes act against us... we also have a team focus to protect our backyard by winning our home games...".

7 June	Glenora	10-8 (0-8)	Mt Albert	Harold Moody Park 1
2:30	Try: Bronson Bernard (56m), Lelu Lagaaia (72m); Con: Noah Connolly (72m)		Try: Ethan Pepper (27m), Liam Ackland (49m)	Referee: Mina Nomani

7 June	Waitemata	12-30 (8-8)	Howick	Ranui Domain 1
2:30	Try: Lorenzo Huxley (15m), Vaisigano Nuuli (34m), Dason Masiutama (52m)		Try: Lopini Lama 3 (8m, 64m, 71m), Peter Wikaire 2 (28m, 66m), Joshua Setefano (78m); Con: Rongonui Andrews (65m, 68m, 80m)	Referee: Simon Bailey

7 June	Otara	62-14 (36-6)	Pakuranga	Ngati Ōtara Park 1
2:30	Try: Tino Palei 3 (1m, 39m, 79m), Miracle Williams (9m), Unknown (11m), Manaia Lauaki 2 (18m, 61m), Josiah Siitia 2 (29m, 53m), Raiden Siafolau (31m), Filipo Utai (69m), Rico Ward (73m); Con: Tino Palei 7/12 (9m, 12m, 19m, 32m, 63m, 70m, 75m)		Try: Tailan Isaaka 2 (34m, 65m), Fetineiai Aigaalii (48m); Con: John Fitzgerald (35m)	Referee: Brent Newton

7 June	Mangere East	12-46 (0-20)	Hibiscus Coast	Walter Massey Park 1
2:30	Try: Jerome Tupuola 2 (75m, 79m); Con: Christian Sifakula 2/2 (76m, 79m)		Try: Max Fuller (1m), George Prescott (4m), Taine Te Kiri-Ryan (8m), Samuel Waterworth (19m), Nehumi Teu (42m), Kavana Te Kiri-Ryan (59m), Korey Craig (65m), George Prescott (70m); Con: Notana Snowden 6/8 (1m, 5m, 43m, 60m, 66m, 72m); Pen: Notana Snowden 1/1 (61m)	Referee: Nigel Williams

7 June	Manurewa	14-30 (14-12)	Northcote	Mountfort Park: Jack Shelly Field
2:30	Try: Daniel du Plessis (4m), Jeremiah Tamatimu (14m), Elijah Solomona (35); Con: Amerika Uili 1/3 (15m)		Try: Tre Stylz Te Awa (19m), Arno Mouton (27m), Teremate Teremate (54m), Taine Neho (66m), Alvin Tu'ione (74m); Con: James Bates 4/5 (20m, 28m, 67m, 76m); Pen: James Bates 1/1 (70m)	Attendance: 250; Referee: Keven Ah-Ken

===== Round 6 =====
The game between Hibisus Coast and Otara was recorded for You Tube by Petes Filming.

14 June	Glenora	32-30 (16-24)	Pakuranga	Harold Moody 1
2:30	Try: Faapale Lafililo (2m), Werner Faaumuumu (16m), Martin Manukia (37m), Sione Ma'asi (44m), Isaia Lilo-Latuselu (54m), Bronson Bernard (56m); Con: Memory Manu Mahe 4/6 (3m, 17m, 45m, 55m)		Try: Carlos Hakeai 2 (7m, 27m), Joshua Cooper (24m), Andrew Mana (29m), Tailan Isaaka (50m); Con: John Fitzgerald 5/5 (8m, 25m, 28m, 31m, 52m)	Referee: Brent Newton

14 June	Mangere East	62-4 (12-0)	Waitemata	Walter Massey Park 1
2:30	Try: Nukuru Ngere (3m), Townsend Umaga (20m), Morgan Misifoa (44m), Liam Poe-Viviani 2 (47m, 56m), Siale Lavulavu 3 (50m, 57m, 76m), Lemale Seiuli (67m), Lenin Simi (75m), Nazareth Vaiouga (80m); Con: Christian Sifakula 9 (4m, 20m, 45m, 48m, 56m, 58m, 67m, 77m, 80m)		Try: Dason Masiutama (62m)	Referee: Poriau Uamaki

14 June	Northcote	WBD (50) - LBD (0)	Mt Albert	Birkenhead War Memorial 4
2:30				Referee: Aaron Kesha

14 June	Manurewa	18-19 (6-10)	Howick	Mountfort Park: Jack Shelly Field
2:30	Try: Elijah Solomona (5m), Hauriri Harvey (45m), Amerika Uili (56m); Con: Hauriri Harvey 1/1 (7m), Nathan Simmons 2/2 (47m, 57m)		Try: Mason Te Rore (26m), Rongonui Andrews (40m), Paula Fukofuka (68m); Con: Liuaki Lelenoa 3/3 (28m, 40m, 69m); Drop: Ronogonui Andrews (78m)	Referee: Gabriel Thompson

14 June	Hibiscus Coast	26-6 (20-0)	Otara	Stanmore Bay 1
2:30	Try: Korey Craig (2m), Kavana Te Ryan (6m), Taine Tekiri Ryan (9m), George Prescott (32m), Samuel Waterworth (60m); Con: Notana Snowden 3/5 (3m, 10m, 61m)		Try: Patita Lakai (45m); Con: Tito Palei 1/1 (46m)	Referee: Keven Ah-Ken

===== Round 7 =====
Mangere East threatened to win easily against Manurewa, leading 28-6 at halftime but Manurewa held them in the second half for a final score of 40-18. For the Hawks Nukurua Ngere scored three tries. Both Christian Sifakula (6/7), and Nathan Simmons (3/3) kicked a combined 9 for 10 while Simmons also added a try for the Marlins. At Birkenhead War Memorial Park, the home Northcote side won comfortably over Glenora. They extended an 18-0 halftime lead to win 40-6 through nine tries, five of which were converted by Taine Neho. Teremate Teremate scored three tries. Hibiscus Coast scored 40 first half points to 0 at a wet Ti Rakau Park and didn't let up in the second half adding another 32 unanswered points. Full back Korey Craig backed up well using his pace to score four tries while Nehumi Teu, Kavana Te Kiri-Ryan, and Nathan Austen all scored doubles. Notana Snowden kicked well, converting 10 of their 13 tries. The match was streamed for YouTube by G2G Productions. Another home team suffered a heavy defeat with Waitemata going down to Otara 70-0 at the Ranui Domain. Tino Palei scored four tries for the Scorpions, while Filipo Utai scored two. Vaicane Marsters also scored twice to go with three conversions. He and Palei only converted five of their fifteen tries. Their coach, Willie Maea said "after our loss to the Raiders it was important to get back in the winning path as we prepare for our final month of games before finals". "The boys for into their job straight from kickoff and despite the weather played a good, positive game... a good team effort with strong carries in the middle to create space for the edges to score".

28 June	Mangere East	40-18 (28-6)	Manurewa	Walter Massey Park 1, Māngere
2:30	Try: Numiamasasulu Tema (16m), Siale Lavulavu (19m), Nukurua Ngere 3 (30m, 39m, 49m), Jerome Tupuola (33m), Siale Lavulavu (75m); Con: Christian Sifakula 6/7 (17m, 20m, 32m, 40m, 50m, 80m)		Try: Nathan Simmons (27m), Bodhi Hape (43m), Jeremiah Tamatimu (53m); Con: Nathan Simmons 3/3 (28m, 44m, 54m)	Referee: Brent Newton

28 June	Mt Albert	LBD-WBD	Howick	Fowlds Park 1, Morningside
2:30

28 June	Northcote	46-6 (18-0)	Glenora	Birkenhead War Memorial Park 4, Birkenhead
2:30	Try: Jonathan Little (20m), Vinnie Chan (24m), Teremate Teremate 3 (29m, 70m, 77m), Kyson Hughes (42m), Xavier Rice (53m), Huston Holloway (66m), Jackson Runga (74m); Con: Taine Neho 5/9 (21m, 26m, 30m, 53m, 67m)		Try: Faapale Lafililo (48m); Con: Memory Manu Mahe (50m)	Referee: David Millar

28 June	Pakuranga	0-72 (0-40)	Hibiscus Coast	Ti Rakau Park 1, Pakuranga
2:30			Try: Korey Craig 4 (1m, 12m, 41m, 79m), Nehumi Teu 2 (6m, 28m), Kavana Tekiri-Ryan 2 (11m, 66m), Nathan Austen 2 (17m, 51m), Tipene Snowden (40m), Cody Jones (56m), Max Fuller (73m); Con: Notana Snowden 10/13 (2m, 7m, 12m, 13m, 20m, 40m, 43m, 67m, 74m, 80m)	Referee: Poriau Uamaki

28 June	Waitemata	0-70 (0-40)	Otara	Ranui Domain 1, Rānui
2:30			Try: Tovia Christopher (7m), Galuafi Sega (11m), Raiden Siafolau (14m), Kurtis Cooper (19m), Vaicane Marsters 2 (22m, 71m), Tino Palei 4 (25m, 28m, 36m, 77m), Filipo Utai 2 (42m, 51m), Rico Toeava Ward (48m), Jaycob Ru (56m), Josiah Siitia (59m); Con: Tino Palei 2 (8m, 15m), Vaicane Marsters 3 (27m, 30m, 61m)	Referee: Mina Nomani

===== Round 8 =====
Manurewa scored an upset 20-18 win over Otara. it was four tries each but Nathan Simmons converted two tries while for Otara Vaicane Marsters only converted one of Otara's. Tamenu Temanu's 57th minute try gave them the lead which they held on to. At Paparoa Park the home team moved out to a 16-0 half time lead which they stretched to 38-0 before a late rally by the Tigers gave some respectability. Peter Heretama Wikaire scored three tries and Paula Fukofuka two, while Rongonui Andrews scored a try to go with five conversions. At Stanmore Bay the home team was up 50-0 at halftime and added another 48 points in the second half to continue Glenora's awful season. Korey Craig, the Raiders fullback scored a remarkable 50 points from six tries and 13 goals. Alipate Liava'a, Jonathan Milne, and Nathan Natano scored two tries each. At Ti Rakau Park the visiting Waitemata side scored a converted try on fulltime to Dason Masiutama to draw the match 14-14 after the Jaguars led 10-4 at halftime and 14-4 soon after. Masiutama scored a double.

5 July	Manurewa	20-18 (16-10)	Otara	Mountfort Park: Jack Shelly Field, Manurewa
2:30	Try: Jeremiah Margraff (3m), Seth Marsters (22m), Amerika Uili (37m), Temanu Temanu (57m); Con: Nathan Simmons 2 (23m, 38m)		Try: Filipo Utai (6m), Joshua Tufuga 2 (26m, 71m), Tino Palei (52m); Con: Vaicane Marsters (28m)	Referee: Baha Dib

5 July	Howick	46-16 (16-0)	Northcote	Paparoa Park 1, Howick
2:30	Try: Peter Heretama Wikaire 3 (22m, 38m, 67m), Paula Fukofuka 2 (34m, 53m), Liuaki Lelenoa (42m), Sione Tuimoala (50m), Rongonui Andrews (60m), Lopingi Lama (80m); Con: Rongonui Andrews (23m, 38m, 43m, 52m, 62m)		Try: Tait Wenzlick (64m), Caleb Arama (76m), Jackson Runga (79m); Con: Tait Wenzlick (65m, 77m)	Referee: Gabriel Thompson

5 July	Hibiscus Coast	98-0 (50-0)	Glenora	Stanmore Bay 1, Whangaparaoa
2:30	Try: Korey Craig 6 (2m, 8m, 13m, 25m, 65m, 77m), Alipate Liava'a 2 (6m, 35m), Samuel Waterworth (22m), Kavana Te Kiri-Ryan (28m), Corey Cassidy-Natano (33m), Corey Levien (42m), Jonathan Milne 2 (46m, 55m), Max Fuller (49m), Cody Jones (52m), Nathan Natano 2 (58m, 60m); Con: Korey Craig 13/18 (3m, 9m, 14m, 23m, 27m, 29m, 36m, 43m, 47m, 53m, 56m, 61m, 78m)			Referee: Grant Smith

5 July	Pakuranga	14-14 (10-4)	Waitemata	Ti Rakau Park 1, Pakuranga
2:30	Try: Carlos Hakeai (9m), Neti Falefa (26m), John Fitzgerald (45m); Con: John Fitzgerald (28m)		Try: Sevele Fainu (40m), Dason Masiutama 2 (63m, 78m); Con: Sam Tuialii (80m)	Referee: Davey Misileki

===== Round 9 =====
The game between Hibiscus Coast and Northcote at Stanmore Bay Park was streamed by Petes Filming YouTube channel.

12 July	Glenora	12-70 (6-32)	Manurewa	Harold Moody Park 1, Glen Eden
2:30	Try: Gordon Lemisio (3m), Memory Manu Mahe (73m); Con: Faapale Lafililo 2/2 (4m, 74m)		Try: Amerika Uili (8m), Tamati Hebden (11m), Temanu Temanu 3 (20m, 38m, 64m), Jayson Losefo (29m), Sione Kivalu (34m), Nathan Simmons (41m), Tyson Slade (47m), Piringi Tawhai (50m), Josiah Andrew 2 (56m, 77m), James Clay (60m); Con: Nathan Simmons 9/13 (9m, 22m, 35m, 40m, 48m, 51m, 58m, 61m, 78m)	Referee: Hemana Ryan

12 July	Hibiscus Coast	21-20 (10-16)	Northcote	Stanmore Bay 2, Whangaparaoa
2:30	Try: Kavana Te Kiri-Ryan (9m), Max Fuller (22m), Taine Te Kiri Ryan (41m), Nehumi Teu (57m); Con: Notana Snowden 2/4 (23m, 58m); Drop: Notana Snowden (78m)		Try: Jonathan Little (2m), Arno Mouton (14m), Jackson Runga (39m), Huston Holloway (30m); Con: Nickolas Lythgo 2/4 (3m, 40m)	Referee: Aaron Kesha

12 July	Otara	30-14 (14-8)	Mangere East	Ngāti Ōtara Park 1, Ōtara
2:30	Try: Tito Palei 2 (12m, 28m), Joshua Tufuga (33m), Rico Toeava Ward (46m), Filpo Utai (63m), Atelea Filo (73m); Con: Tito Palei (14m), Miracle Williams 2 (47m, 74m)		Try: Siale Lavulavu 2 (7m, 69m), Jerome Tupuola (19m); Con: Christian Sifakula (70m)	Referee: Poriau Uamaki

12 July	Howick	38-18 (20-0)	Pakuranga	Paparoa Park 1, Howick
2:30	Try: Lopingi Lama 3 (3m, 17m, 57m), Paula Fukofuka (20m), Peter Heretama Wikaire (36m), Richard Piper 2 (46m, 71m); Con: Rongonui Andrews 5 (21m, 37m, 47m, 59m, 73m)		Try: Carlos Tairawhiti (75m), Samuel Ilaiu (61m), Isaako Isaako (69m); Con: Stanley Kuka 2 (62m, 70m), Samuel Ilaiu (75m)	Referee: Gabriel Thompson

===== Round 10 =====
19 July	Glenora	10-54 (10-20)	Howick	Harold Moody Park 1, Glen Eden
2:30	Try: Faapale Lafililo (21m), Ronald Vaotuua (33m); Con: Faapale Lafililo (34m)		Try: Alexander van den Dop 3 (1m, 28m, 52m), Peter Heretama Wikaire 3 (7m, 66m, 80m), Sean Churchward-Isaaka (13m), Nepia Savage (49m), Sione Tuimoala (58m), Christian Faafoi (62m); Con: Rongonui Andrews 7/10 (1m, 14m, 49m, 58m, 64m, 66m, 80m)	Referee: Simon Bailey

19 July	Hibiscus Coast	96-0 (50-0)	Waitemata	Stanmore Bay 1, Whangaparaoa
2:30	Try: Max Fuller (3m), Taine Te Kiri-Ryan 2 (7m, 11,), Cody Jones (16m), Jaeden Foua (19m), Korey Craig 2 (23m, 72m), George Prescott (31m), Notana Snowden (34m), Joshua Hale (38m), Alipate Liava'a (42m), Nehumi Teu 3 (50m, 62m, 65m), Kavana Te Kiri-Ryan (56m), Tipene Snowden (60m), Cody Jones (76m); Con: Notana Snowden 15/17 (5m, 12m, 17m, 20m, 24m, 33m, 36m, 43m, 51m, 57m, 60m, 63m, 67m, 73m)			Referee: Grant Smith

19 July	Pakuranga	6-36 (0-12)	Manurewa	Ti Rakau Park 1, Pakuranga
2:30	Try: Neti Falefa (72m); Con: John Fitzgerald (74m)		Try: Hauriri Harvey 2 (16m, 43m), Sione Kivalu (30m), Temanu Temanu (50m), Jeremiah Margraff 2 (56m, 78m), Seth Marsters (63m); Con: Hauriri Harvey 3 (18m, 32m, 58m), Raymond Tuilimu Jr (65m)	Referee: Gabriel Thompson

19 July	Northcote	20-18 (8-10)	Mangere East	Birkenhead War Memorial Park 4, Birkenhead
2:30	Try: Ethan Schaumkel (22m), Jackson Runga (34m), Huston Holloway (74m), Vinnie Chan (78m); Con: Nickolas Lythgo 2/4 (75m, 80m)		Try: Morgan Misifoa (6m), Lenin Simi (16m), Christian Sifakula (45m), Siale Lavulavu (47m); Con: Christian Sifakula (18m)	Referee: Jordan Chand

===== Round 11 =====
26 July	Otara	26-28 (10-10)	Northcote	Ngati Ōtara Park 1, Ōtara
2:30	Try: Rico Toeava Ward (30m), Filipo Utai (33m, 67m), Patiti Lakai (59m), Manu Fatialofa (64m); Con: Filipo Utai (31m, 60m, 65m)		Try: Jason Bhana (2m), Vinnie Chan (6m), Tiriaere Tiriaere (58m), Jackson Runga (72m), Taine Neho (80m); Con: Nickolas Lythgo 4/5 (7m, 61m, 73m, 80m)	Referee: Aaron Kesha

26 July	Howick	28-32 (4-26)	Mangere East Hawks	Paparoa Park 1, Howick
2:30	Try: Lopingi Lama (3m), Joshua Setefano (42m), Sione Tuimoala 2 (63m, 75m), Peter Heretama Wikaire (78m); Con: Rongonui Andrews 4/5 (43m, 64m, 76m, 78m)		Try: Charles Laumape (9m), Morgan Misifoa (12m), Christian Sifakula (20m), Jerome Tupuloa (33m), Nazareth Vaiouga (71m); Con: Christian Sifakula 5/5 (10m, 14m, 21m, 35m, 73m); Pen: Olevainaliutoto Kini 1/1 (38m)	Referee: Poriau Uamaki

26 July	Manurewa	12-38 (6-22)	Hibiscus Coast	Mountfort Park: Jack Shelly Field, Manurewa
2:30	Try: Amerika Uili (11m), Jeremiah Tamatimu (70m); Con: Nathan Simmons (12m, 71m)		Try: George Prescott 2 (5m, 40m), Korey Craig 3 (13m, 36m, 71m), Nathan Ashe (18m), Max Fuller (43m); Con: Notana Snowden 5 (7m, 15m, 19m, 41m, 73m)	Referee: Gabriel Thompson

26 July	Waitemata	26-40	Glenora	Ranui Domain 1, Rānui
2:30	Try: Leolo Fetumapu (36m), Roy Siovaiata (47m), Jamazse Masiutama (58m), William Tutai (62m), Isaac Newman (79m); Con: Roy Siovaiata (38m), Mikaere Marshall 2 (59m, 63m)		Try: Faapale Lafililo (11m), Denzel Lepua (17m), Noah Connolly (20m), Memory Mahe (31m), Kalepo Tuifua (43m), Ian Noga (67m), Bronson Bernard (71m), Werner Faaumuumu (75m); Con: Memory Mahe (18m, 21m, 32m, 76m)	Referee: Simon Bailey

==== Playoffs ====
===== Quarterfinals =====
2 August	Otara	36-16 (28-4)	Howick	Ngati Ōtara Park 1, Ōtara
2:30	Try: Tito Palei 4 (3m, 8m, 21m, 38m), Miracle Williams (29m), Herman Retzlaff (62m), Kurtis Cooper (77m); Con: Fuamaila Gatapu 2 (5m, 9m), Filipo Utai 2 (30m, 39m)		Try: Peter Heretama Wikaire (13m), Xander Mahu-Delamere (56m), Paula Fukofuka (72m); Con: Rongonui Andrews 2 (57m, 73m)	Referee: Keven Ah Ken, TJ's: Kone Lavea and Michael Une

2 August	Manurewa	16-12 (6-6)	Mangere East	Mountfort Park: Jack Shelly Field, Manurewa
2:30	Try: Amerika Uili (17m, 80m), Seth Marsters (59m); Con: Nathan Simmons (19m, 60m)		Try: Nukurua Ngere (32m), Siale Lavulavu (52m); Con: Christian Sifakula (33m, 53m)	Referee: Brent Newton, TJ's: Taura Taura and Moses Luke Ripia

===== Semi Finals =====
9 August	Hibiscus Coast	46-22 (24-12)	Manurewa	Stanmore Bay 1, Whangaparaoa
2:30	Try: Nehumi Teu 4 (14m, 19m, 62m, 75m), Korey Craig 2 (22m, 68m), Cody Jones (26m), Taine Te-Kiri Ryan (35m), Kavana Tekiri-Ryan (52m); Con: Notana Snowden 5 (20m, 23m, 54m, 64m, 70m)		Try: Jeremiah Tamatimu 2 (1m, 33m), Sione Kivalu (41m), Charlie Archer (80m); Con: Nathan Simmons 3 (2m, 34m, 42m)	Referee: Aaron Kesha, TJ's: Warren Clarke and Jordan Chand

9 August	Northcote	14-20 (10-6)	Otara	Birkenhead War Memorial 4, Birkenhead
2:30	Try: Bronson Kapi (14m), Jackson Runga (30m), Jonathan Little (56m); Con: Nickolas Lythgo (31m)		Try: Filipo Utai (2m), Hansell Semau (44m), Mana'ia Lauaki (59m), Atelea Filo (77m); Con: Fuamaila Gatapu (46m); Pen: Fuamaila Gatapu (40m)	Referee: Keven Ah-Ken, TJ's: Hemana Ryan and Nigel Williams

===== Sharman Cup Grand Final =====
The grand final was played in West Auckland at the Trusts Arena on Sunday, August 17 with an early morning kickoff time of 9:45am. Otara led 12-4 at halftime before Hibiscus Coast came back to level the scores at 16-16. A second try to Taine Tekiri-Ryan gave Notana Snowden a chance to tie the score with ten minutes remaining but his kick fell short. Otara held on in the final stages to win the Sharman Cup for the third time in their history following wins in 2014 and 2023. The match was live streamed on the ARL YouTube channel.

17 August	Otara	22-20 (12-4)	Hibiscus Coast	Trusts Arena 1, Henderson
9:45	Try: Peyrce Tanaki (12m), Fuamaila Gatapu (27m), Tito Palei (45m), Joshua Tufuga (59m); Con: Fuamaila Gatapu 3/4 (13m, 29m, 61m)		Try: Taine Tekiri-Ryan 2 (8m, 68m), Korey Craig (49m), Samuel Waterworth (56m); Con: Notana Snowden 2/4 (51m, 57m)	Attendance: 400; Referee: Keven Ah Ken, TJ's: Corey Jull and Ryan Doherty (Hemana Ryan on standby)

=== Championship Women ===
==== Championship Women Standings ====
Team	Pld	W	D	L	B	F	A	PD	Pts
Pukekohe Pythons	9	8	0	1	0	360	42	+318	16
Mt Albert Lions	8	6	0	2	1	290	108	+182	14
Richmond Rovers	7	5	0	2	1	202	74	+128	12
Waitemata Seagulls	8	2	0	6	1	116	240	-124	6
Glenfield Greyhounds	8	2	0	6	0	86	288	-202	4

==== Fixtures and Results ====
The June 15 match between Glenfield and Richmond was declared a no result. The Glenfield team was then suspended for their next two matches which resulted in default losses. After defaulting to Pukekohe on June 22, the East Coast Bays side withdrew from the competition.

	Date		Score		Score	Referee	Venue
Round 1	10 May	Glenfield	16	Waitemata	12	Nigel Williams	Cornwall Park 12:45
	10 May	Richmond Roses	WBD	Mt Albert Ch. Lionesses	LBD	-	Cornwall Park 2, 12:45
	11 May	Pukekohe Wahine	WBD	East Coast Bays	LBD	-	Navigation Homes Stadium 2, 12:45
Round 2	18 May	Mt Albert ch. Lionesses	40	Glenfield	14	Nigel Williams	Fowlds Park 1, 2:30pm
	18 May	East Coast Bays	0	Waitemata	30	Aaron Kesha	Freyburg Park 1, 2:30
	18 May	Pukekohe Wahine	18	Richmond Roses	4	Tameilau Pauuvale	Navigation Homes Stadium 2, 2:30
Round 3	25 May	Glenfield	44	East Coast Bays	0	Nigel Williams	Sunnynook Park 1, 2:30pm
	25 May	Mt Albert ch. Lionesses	16	Pukekohe Wahine	8	Tameilau Pauuvale	Fowlds Park 1, 2:30
	25 May	Waitemata	8	Richmond Roses	24	David Millar	Ranui Domain 1, 2:30
Round 4	8 June	Pukekohe Wahine	54	Glenfield	4	Tameilau Pauuvale	Navigation Homes Stadium 2, 2:30pm
	8 June	Richmond Roses	WBD	East Coast Bays	LBD	David Millar	Fowlds Park 1, 2:30
	8 June	Waitemata	8	Mt Albert ch. Lionesses	42	Nigel Williams	Ranui Domain 1, 2:30
Round 5	15 June	Glenfield	No Result	Richmond Roses	No Result	David Millar	Sunnynook Park 1, 2:30
	15 June	Pukekohe Wahine	66	Waitemata	0	Tameilau Pauuvale	Navigation Homes Stadium 2, 2:30
	15 June	East Coast Bays	0	Mt Albert ch. Lionesses	78	Nigel Williams	Freyburg Park 1, 2:30
Round 6	22 June	Waitemata	WBD	Glenfield	LBD	-	-
	22 June	Mt Albert	18	Richmond Roses	28	-	Fowlds Park 1, 2:30
	22 June	East Coast Bays	LBD	Pukekohe Wahine	WBD	-	-
Round 7	29 June	Glenfield	LBD	Mt Albert ch. Lionesses	WBD	-	-
	29 June	Richmond Roses	6	Pukekohe Wahine	26	David Millar	Grey Lynn Park 1, 2:30
Round 8	6 July	Richmond Roses	-	Waitemata	-	David Millar	Grey Lynn Park 1, 2:30
	6 July	Pukekohe Wahine	-	Mt Albert ch. Lionesses	-	Tameilai Pauuvale	Prince Edward Park 1, 2:30
Round 9	13 July	Glenfield Women	4	Pukekohe Wahine	42	-	Sunnynook Park 1, 2:30
	13 July	Mt Albert ch. Lionesses	46	Waitemata Women	0	-	Fowlds Park 1, 2:30
Round 10	20 July	Richmond Roses	40	Glenfield Women	4	Tameilau Pauuvale	Grey Lynn Park 1, 2:30
	20 July	Waitemata Women	8	Pukekohe Wahine	46	David Millar	Ranui Domain 1, 2:30
Semi Final 1	27 July	Pukekohe Wahine	60	Waitemata Women	0	Tameilau Pauuvale	Dr John Lightbody Reserve 1, Tuakau, 2:30
Semi Final 2	27 July	Mt Albert ch. Lionesses	10	Richmond Roses	14	David Millar	Fowlds Park 1, 2:30

==== Final ====
3 August	Pukekohe Wahine	26-4 (16-0)	Richmond Roses	Cornwall Park 1, Greenlane West, Epsom
1:30	Try: Billy-Jean Ale (2m), Bobbi Walker (27m), Te Aroha Neal 2 (31m, 62m), Azania Watene (56m); Con: Cheynne Slade 3 (3m, 29m, 56m)		Try: Matireamakura Rose Allen (50m)	Referee: Tameilau Pauuvale, TJ's: David Millar and Liam Clayton

=== Fox Premier Reserves ===
The Otahuhu side, like their senior team was undefeated through the season. After an exodus of senior players in the off season the Te Atatu Roosters failed to field a reserve grade team for the first time in five decades. As in previous seasons the Ponsonby club failed to field a premier reserve team also meaning the competition was restricted to eight teams.

==== Standings ====
Team	Pld	W	D	L	F	A	PD	Pts
Otahuhu Leopards	12	12	0	0	452	130	+322	24
Mount Albert Lions	12	9	0	3	384	162	+222	18
Richmond Bulldogs	12	7	0	5	358	271	+87	14
Papakura Sea Eagles	12	7	0	5	368	282	+86	14
Manukau Magpies	12	6	1	5	238	306	-68	13
Point Chevalier Pirates	12	5	1	6	281	268	+13	11
Marist Saints	12	0	1	11	172	466	-294	1
Bay Roskill Vikings	12	0	1	11	86	454	-368	1

==== Premier Reserves Grand Final ====
16 August	Otahuhu	30-16 (14-10)	Richmond	Bert Henham Park 1, Otāhuhū
12:45	Try: Sage Shaw-Tait 2 (1m, 74m), Dylan Uate 2 (8m, 23m), Jamie Jnr Te Whata (52m), Tom Va'afusuaga (63m); Con: Jamie Jnr Te Whata 3 (2m, 54m, 64m)		Try: Kian Ah Sue (14m), Gerar Vili (20m), Siliga Kepaoa (43m); Con: Jack Mancer 2 (21m, 44m)	Referee: Ryan Doherty, TJ's: David Millar and James Priest

=== Sharman Cup Premier Reserves ===
==== Standings ====
Team	Pld	W	D	L	F	A	PD	Pts
Otara Scorpions	11	11	0	0	554	126	+428	22
Mangere East Hawks	11	8	0	3	352	226	+126	16
Hibiscus Coast Raiders	11	7	0	4	338	222	+116	14
Northcote Tigers	11	5	0	6	360	292	+68	10
Manurewa Marlins	11	5	0	6	250	340	-90	10
Howick Hornets	11	4	0	7	218	258	-140	8
Waitemata Seagulls	11	4	0	7	224	434	-210	8
Pakuranga Jaguars	11	0	0	11	144	442	-298	0

==== Sharman Cup Premier Reserves Grand Final ====
16 August	Otara	42-14 (20-4)	Mangere East	Ngati Ōtara Park 1, Ōtara
12:45	Try: Andrew Talapule (2m), Joshua Perez (6m), Robin-John Kamana (8m), Johnsim Tupa-Rangi (25m), Tagisia Fulutusi (43m), Galuafi Sega (48m), Afa Sale (64m), Masoteis Pritchard (77m); Con: Tagisia Fulutusi 4 (3m, 10m, 65m, 78m), Vaicane Marsters (45m)		Try: Atonio Manuhaapai (38m), Charles Laumape (67m), Malachi Vaiouga (71m); Con: Sione Filimoeatu (72m)	Referee: Hemana Ryan, TJ's: Gabriel Thompson and Ngaone Sefo

=== Open Age Restricted ===
==== Final ====
2 August	Waiheke	34-20	Manurewa	Cornwall Park 1, Greenlane West, Epsom
2:30				Referee: Hemana Ryan, TJ's: James Priest and Casey Gribble

=== Senior B (Ray Cranch Cup) ===
==== Ray Cranch Cup Final ====
The grand final was played between the two Manukau Magpies sides at Cornwall Park on August 9. It was recorded by G2G Productions.

9 August	Manukau Stingrays	14-20 (10-4)	Manukau Spartans	Cornwall Park 2, Greenlane West, Epsom
2:30	Try: Stephen Roberts (20m), Kehua Rahiri (26m), Raukawa Heteraka (64m); Con: George Malifa (27m)		Try: Pat Hufanga 2 (39m, 71m), Junior Tuileisu (46m), Kaes Strickland (56m); Con: Kaes Strickland (48m)	Attendance: 100

=== Under 18 Boys ===
==== Under 18 Boys Standings ====
Team	Pld	W	D	L	F	A	PD	Pts
Papatoetoe Panthers	9	9	0	0	-	-	-	18
Mount Albert Lions	9	8	0	1	-	-	-	16
Glenora Bears	9	6	0	3	-	-	-	12
Otahuhu Leopards	9	6	0	3	-	-	-	12
Te Iti Rearea	9	5	0	4	-	-	-	10
Te Atatu Roosters	9	5	0	4	-	-	-	10
Papakura Sea Eagles	9	3	0	6	-	-	-	6
Mangere East Hawks	9	2	0	7	-	-	-	4
Richmond Bulldogs	9	1	0	8	-	-	-	2

==== Under 18 Boys Final ====
The grand final was played between Papatoetoe and Glenora at Cornwall Park on August 2. It was recorded by Auckland Rugby League and live streamed.

2 August	Papatoetoe	14-8 (10-4)	Glenora	Cornwall Park 1, Greenlane West, Epsom
12:30	Try: Kaydon Fruean-Otineru (7m, 43m), Mahe Fangupo (13m); Con: Su'e Gatapu (8m)		Try: Hinckley Ioka (27m), Noah Hollands (38m)	Attendance: 200

=== Under 15 A ===
==== Standings ====
The standings are from the Round Robin which followed the grading games which featured four matches per side to qualify.

Team	Pld	W	D	L	F	A	%	Pts
Mangere East Hawks	6	4	1	1	162	92	+70	9
Otara Scorpions	6	4	1	1	142	110	+32	9
Glenora Westside Bears	6	4	0	2	184	110	+74	8
Manurewa Marlins Gold	6	2	0	4	130	126	+4	4
Richmond Southbase	6	2	0	4	126	168	-42	4
Otahuhu Leopards	6	1	0	5	96	234	-138	2

==== Final ====
	Date		Score		Score	Referee	Venue
Final	1 Aug	Mangere East Hawks Boys	6	Glenora Westside Bears	36	Casey Gribble, TJ's: Liam Clayton & Kahi Thompson	Mt Smart Stadium 1, 5:40pm

=== Under 14 B ===
==== Standings ====
The standings are from the Round Robin which followed the three grading rounds.

==== Under 14 B Final ====
	Date		Score		Score	Referee	Venue
Final	1 Aug	Manurewa	46	Glenora Roar Bears	0	-	Mountfort Park: Jack Shelly, 2pm
