= 2022 Auckland Rugby League season =

Auckland Rugby League
- Founded: 1909
- Competitions: Fox Memorial Premiership, Women's Premiership, Sharman Cup, Women's Championship, Premier Firsts, Ray Cranch Cup
- Website: aucklandleague.co.nz
- As of 6 August 2022

The 2022 Auckland Rugby League season is its 114th season since the founding of the Auckland Rugby League in 1909. Point Chevalier Pirates won the Fox Memorial Shield for the 6th time with a 14–12 win over the Glenora Bears.

Manurewa Kowhai, the Manurewa Marlins premier women's team, won the women's premiership when they defeated Point Chevalier 16 points to 6. Their championship team, the Manurewa Whero, won the championship competition.

The Akarana Falcons men's and women's teams both won the New Zealand Rugby League Premiership competitions. The men's team beat Canterbury Bulls 46–4 in the final on October 1 at North Harbour Stadium, while the women beat Counties Manukau Stingrays 24–12 at Mount Smart Stadium on April 16.

Preceded by 2021	114th Auckland Rugby League season 2022	Succeeded by 2023

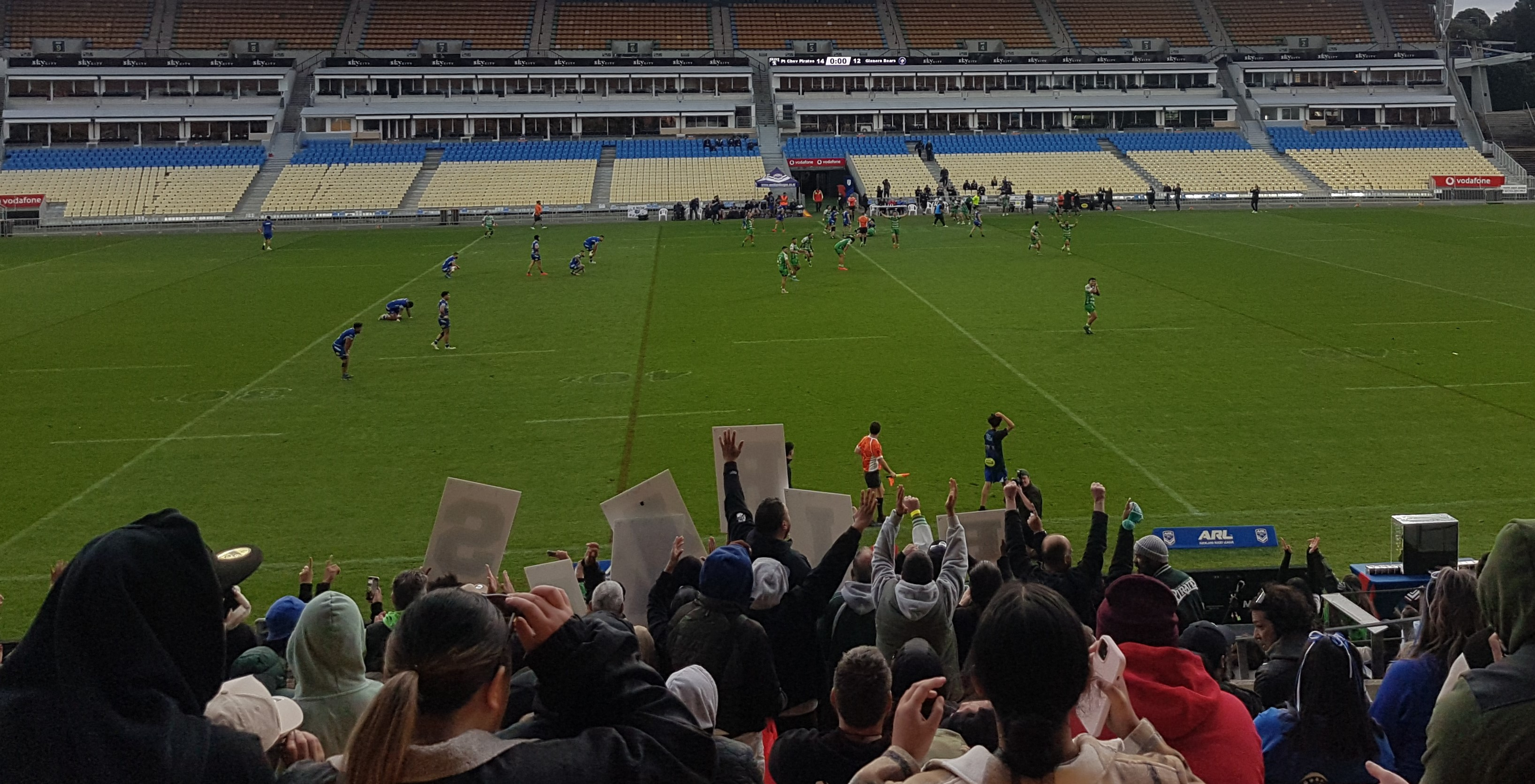
Point Chevalier wins the Fox Memorial Shield

The season began with a northern regional age group representative competition for under 16's (Shaun Johnson Shield) and under 18's (Dean Bell Cup). The finals were held on April 2 at Mount Smart Stadium in Auckland. Tāmaki ki te Tonga (South) defeated Tāmaki ki te Raki (North) 20 points to 12 to win the U16 Shaun Johnson Shield. The Under 18 Dean Bell Cup was won by Tāmaki ki te Uru (West), who beat Tāmaki ki te Raki (North) 46–12. The Ruben Wiki Cup for the New Zealand Under 20s teams was won by Akarana Falcons, representing the North Shore and West Auckland clubs. They beat the South Island Scorpions 34–16 in the final at Mt Smart Stadium on April 16. Following this match the New Zealand Women's premiership final was played between Akarana Falcons and Counties-Manukau Stingrays, with Akarana winning their first title in 11 years when they won 24–12.

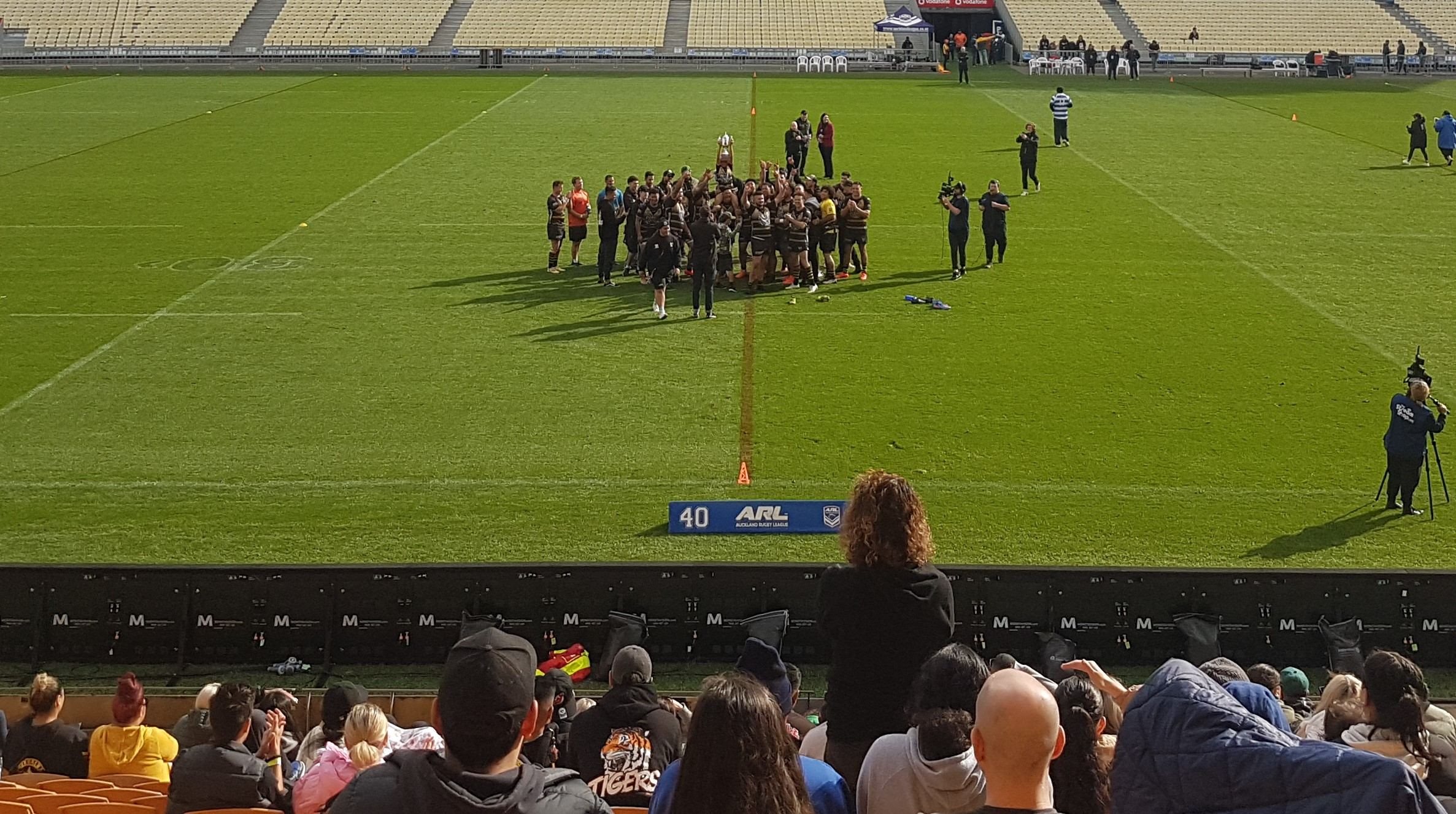
Northcote lifts the Sharman Cup.

The Fox Memorial Shield competition was split into 2 sections with 9 teams in section 1 and 10 teams in section 2. This was the first time in many years that all teams were technically eligible to win the premier senior men's title. It did however mean that there were a large number of very lopsided matches. Section 1 however was relatively competitive. In section 2 Glenora Bears and Otahuhu Leopards finished in the top 2 positions and secured home semi finals which they both won to advance to the semi-finals where they met each other with Glenora winning 28–16. In section 1 Point Chevalier Pirates and Howick Hornets met in their semi final with Point Chevalier winning 24–12. In the grand final on August 6, Point Chevalier defeated Glenora before a crowd of 1,000 at Mt Smart Stadium 1 by 14 points to 12. This was the 6th time Point Chevalier had won the Fox Memorial Shield in their history with the previous wins being in 1953, 2013, 2014, 2015, and 2018. The match doubled as the Stormont Shield final so Point Chevalier had an additional trophy to add to the cabinet. The held on to the Roope Rooster Trophy also after going undefeated in home challenges. Northcote Tigers won the Sharman Cup when they defeated Pakuranga Jaguars 32–28 in the curtain-raiser to the Fox Memorial final at Mt Smart on August 6. this was their 4th time winning the Sharman Cup after previous wins in 1979, 2003, and 2007. Point Chevalier also won the reserve grade title after beating Te Atatu Roosters 18–6 in the Fox Premier firsts final on August 5, while Bay Roskill Vikings defeated Otara Scorpions 22–14 in the Fox Championship Premier firsts final.

The Senior B, Ray Cranch Cup was won by Pukekohe Pythons who beat Takahiwai Northern (Northern Pine) 25–24 in the grand final. Richmond Tokes beat East Coast Bays in the consolation final 36–14.

In the lower grades Otara won the Under 18 boys, Marist won the Under 16 Boys and Mangere East the Under 16 Girls grades. The Under 15 Boys competition was won by Papatoetoe, while the Under 14 Boys was won by Mt Albert, and the Under 14 Girls was won by Mangere East. Ellerslie won the Under 13 Boys competition.

== Season news ==
=== Fox Memorial ===
The Fox Memorial competition for senior teams for 2022 has been shortened due to covid. It will be played over 13 weekends following a later start date than usual (May 7). There will be 2 sections with 9 teams in section 1 and 10 teams in section 2 with the sections organised based on finishing positions in the senior competitions from the 2021 season. The top 6 teams will progress to the Fox Memorial Premiership after 9 rounds and play in a series of knockout games. The top qualifying team from each section will then compete for the Fox Memorial Shield. Teams who finish in the 7–9 and 7–10 positions will playoff for the Sharman Cup. Waitemata Seagulls were originally in section 1 but withdrew a week prior to the commencement of the competition. Ponsonby Ponies was fielding a premier grade side for the first time in 3 seasons though it was in conjunction with the Glenfield Greyhounds. Their first grade side was the Ponsonby club, while the reserve grade side was from the Glenfield club.

The 2 sections were as follows:

- Section 1: Howick Hornets, Mount Albert Lions, Point Chevalier Pirates, Bay Roskill Vikings, Northcote Tigers, Otara Scorpions, Manukau Magpies, Manurewa Marlins, and Hibiscus Coast Raiders.
- Section 2: Glenora Bears, Otahuhu Leopards, Marist Saints, Richmond Rovers, Te Atatu Roosters, Mangere East Hawks, Pakuranga Jaguars, Papakura Sea Eagles, Papatoetoe Panthers, Ponsonby Ponies-(G)

After 9 rounds the 2 teams which gained first round byes from section 1 were Point Chevalier and Howick, while in section 2 Glenora and Otahuhu did the same. In the preliminary finals of the playoffs Mt Albert, Bay Roskill, Te Atatu, and Richmond secured wins to advance to what were effectively quarter final matches. In the quarter-final matches Pt Chevalier defeated Mt Albert, Howick defeated Bay Roskill, Glenora defeated Te Atatu, and Otahuhu defeated Richmond, meaning all four home sides won with no upsets. The semi finals were played at Mt Smart #2 on July 30 with the Glenora defeating Otahuhu 26-18 and the Pt Chevalier beating Howick 24 t0 12.

Pt Chevalier won a tightly contested grand final on August 6 at Mt Smart Stadium #1 by 14 points to 12 to win their 6th ever Fox Memorial title.

==== Coaching ====
The Mount Albert Lions were coached by former New Zealand international Daniel (David) Fa'alogo, and Matt Sturm. Both were ex-Mount Albert players. Sturm also represented New Zealand Māori. Hibiscus Coast Raiders were coached by former Warrior, Jeremiah Pai, who also represented New Zealand Māori. Northcote were coached by former player David Bhana. Richmond's coach was Ricky Henry. Te Atatu were coached by Phil Gordon for the 4th season, and his 2nd as sole head coach. Brian Lafaele was the Otahuhu coach, while Glenora was led by Tony Benson who had been coaching professionally in England for the past two decades as well as coaching the Kiwi Ferns in 2017–18. The Marist side was coached by Zane Pocklington. The very experienced Bernie Herenara coached the Mangere East Hawks side who were in a rebuilding phase after losing many players to other clubs in the off season. Martin Riding was the coach of the Ponsonby (G) side who were making their first appearance in the top grade for a few seasons. The Howick coach was Ruka Loza, who was head coach of Howick for the first time. Manukau's coach was Tamore Nati. Thaine Ashford was the coach of Manurewa. The coach of Pt Chevalier was Frank Fuimaono. Johnathon Paul was coaching the Bay Roskill Vikings, while Visesio Setefano was the head coach of the Papakura Sea Eagles. Pakuranga's head coach was Pila Hingano.

=== Promotion/relegation ===
After the 9 rounds of the regular season the top 12 sides were Pt Chevalier, Glenora, Otahuhu, Te Atatu, Howick, Richmond, Marist, Mt Albert, Bay Roskill, Manukau, Otara & Mangere East. While those teams who finished in the bottom 3 in section 1 and 4 in section 2 were Northcote, Pakuranga, Ponsonby, Manurewa, Hbiscus Coast, Papakura, and Papatoetoe. The top 12 were guaranteed a place in the 2023 Fox Memorial premiership with the remaining teams left to compete in the second division Sharman Cup.

=== Women's competitions ===
As in previous seasons the women's competition matches are being played on Sunday's at 2:30pm. The competing teams in the women's premier grade are: Howick Hornets, Manurewa Wahine Kowhai, Otahuhu Leopards Women, Otara Scorpion Stingers, Point Chevalier Pirates, Ponsonby Ponies, Richmond Roses, and Taniwharau.

The teams in the championship grade are: Manurewa Wahine Whero, Pukekohe Pythons, Marist Saints, Manukau Magpies, and Glenora Bears.

==== Coaching ====
In the Premier Women's competition the sides are coached by Anthony Murray (Richmond Roses), Dion Briggs (Ponsonby), Louis Papalii (Otara), James Sarah (Howick), Sefuluai Tamotu (Otahuhu), and Bronson Harden (Pt Chevalier).

In the championship competition the sides were coached by Alamoti Finau (Marist), Losi Uele (Glenora Valkyries), Joshua Siaosi (Manukau), Chris Whiumui (Pukekohe), and Anthony Matua (Manurewa Wahine Whero).

=== Premier 1st's competition ===
The reserve grade competition followed the same format as the Fox Memorial Shield premiership. Each side played as the curtain-raiser to their more senior side. The combined Ponsonby-Glenfield side was known as 'Glenfield P' but was entirely made up from players of the Glenfield club. The Manukau and Pt Chevalier sides emerged from section 1 to make up one semi final, while Te Atatu came up against Otahuhu in the section 2 semi final. In the Premier First Championship for the lower placed teams Otara and Bay Roskill emerged as the winners for each section to meet in the final.

=== Ray Cranch senior B competition ===
The Ray Cranch Cup, named after the New Zealand international was competed for by Avondale Wolves (affiliated to the Marist club), Pt Chevalier Green, Otara Scorpions Wymondley Strong, Pukekohe Pythons, Richmond Tokes, Otara Scorpions No Excuses, Ponsonby Ponies Central Stallions, Manurewa Marlins, Waitemata Seagulls, East Coast Bays Barricudas, and Otahuhu Snr A Leopards.

=== Inter-club trophies ===
In addition to the main competition for the Fox Memorial Shield there were also several trophies played for between individual senior sides. Point Chevalier beat Bay Roskill in round 1 to claim their inter-club trophy (Ernie Roiall Memorial Trophy). While Northcote defeated Hibiscus Coast in round 1 to win their inter-club trophy (Ted Dalton Cup). In round 5 on June 11 Pt Chevalier beat Mt Albert 42–16 to retain the Lani Latoa Memorial Cup. Glenora defeated Te Atatu 32–6 at Jack Colvin Park during the regular season to retain the Denis Williams Cup on June 18.

=== Club teams and grade participation ===
Marist and Mt Albert fielded a combined side in the U16 grade hence their 1.5 and 21.5 totals. Manurewa Marlins and Otara Scorpions fielded the most teams across all grades with 29. Waikato fielded one team in the Masters grade. Takahiwai were a Northland club but fielded their senior side in the Auckland Senior B competition. Avondale Wolves fielded a Senior B side but were affiliated with the Marist Saints club.

Team	Premiers	Reserves	SenB	Masters	U18	U16	U15	U14	U13	U12	U11	U10	U9	U8	U7	U6	Total
Manurewa Marlins	3	1	1	1	0	1	1	3	2	3	2	2	2	2	2	3	29
Otara Scorpions	2	1	2	2	2	1	1	3	1	3	2	2	2	1	2	2	29
Mangere East Hawks	1	1	0	1	1	2	0	3	2	3	2	4	2	2	2	2	28
Otahuhu Leopards	2	1	1	1	2	2	1	1	2	1	2	2	2	1	2	2	25
Marist Saints	2	1	0	2	0	1.5	1	2	0	2	1	2	2	1	2	2	21.5
Mount Albert Lions	1	1	0	1	1	1.5	1	2	1	1	1	2	2	2	2	2	21.5
Papakura Sea Eagles	1	1	0	1	0	1	1	2	1	1	2	2	2	2	2	2	21
Glenora Bears	2	1	0	1	0	1	0	2	0	2	1	2	2	2	2	2	20
Manukau Magpies	2	1	0	3	0	0	1	1	0	1	2	2	2	2	0	2	19
Point Chevalier Pirates	2	1	1	1	0	0	0	0	1	2	2	2	2	2	1	2	19
Te Atatu Roosters	1	1	0	1	0	0	1	0	0	2	1	2	2	2	3	2	18
Richmond Rovers	2	1	1	1	0	2	0	1	0	1	1	1	1	1	2	2	17
Northcote Tigers	1	1	0	1	0	0	1	0	0	2	1	1	2	1	2	3	16
Ellerslie Eagles	0	0	0	1	1	0	1	1	1	1	0	2	2	2	2	1	15
New Lynn Stags	0	0	0	1	0	1	0	1	1	1	1	2	2	2	1	2	15
Hibiscus Coast Raiders	1	1	0	1	0	0	0	1	0	1	0	2	1	2	2	2	14
Pakuranga Jaguars	1	1	0	1	0	0	0	1	1	1	2	2	1	2	0	1	14
Waitemata Seagulls	0	0	1	1	0	1	0	0	1	1	1	1	2	2	1	2	14
Howick Hornets	2	1	0	1	1	1	0	0	0	0	2	1	1	1	1	1	13
Papatoetoe Panthers	1	1	0	0	0	0	1	1	2	0	0	1	2	1	2	1	13
Pukekohe Pythons	1	0	1	0	0	0	1	0	0	2	0	2	0	2	0	3	12
Bay Roskill Vikings	1	1	0	1	0	0	1	0	1	1	1	1	1	1	0	1	11
Glenfield Greyhounds	0	1	0	1	0	0	0	0	1	1	1	0	1	1	2	1	10
East Coast Bays Barricudas	0	0	1	1	0	0	0	0	0	0	0	0	0	0	2	0	4
Ponsonby Ponies	2	0	1	0	0	0	0	0	0	0	0	0	0	0	0	0	3
Taniwharau Taniwha	1	0	0	0	1	1	0	0	0	0	0	0	0	0	0	0	3
Tuakau	0	0	0	0	0	0	0	0	0	0	0	0	0	0	0	3	3
Mt Wellington Warriors	0	0	0	2	0	0	0	0	0	0	0	0	0	0	0	0	2
Avondale Wolves	0	0	1	0	0	0	0	0	0	0	0	0	0	0	0	0	1
Ngāruawāhia	0	0	0	0	0	0	0	1	0	0	0	0	0	0	0	0	1
Rodney Rams	0	0	0	1	0	0	0	0	0	0	0	0	0	0	0	0	1
Takahiwai	0	0	1	0	0	0	0	0	0	0	0	0	0	0	0	0	1
Waiheke	0	0	0	0	0	0	0	0	0	0	0	0	1	0	0	0	1
Waikato Masters	0	0	0	1	0	0	0	0	0	0	0	0	0	0	0	0	1
Total	32	19	12	30	9	17	13	26	18	33	28	40	39	37	37	46	436

== SAS Fox Memorial Premiership ==
=== Section 1 Standings ===
Team	Pld	W	D	L	B	F	A	%	Pts
Point Chevalier Pirates	8	8	0	0	1	388	112	346.43%	18
Howick Hornets	8	6	0	2	1	228	172	136.56%	14
Mount Albert Lions	8	5	0	3	1	274	170	132.56%	12
Bay Roskill Vikings	8	4	1	3	1	242	222	109.01%	11
Manukau Magpies	8	4	1	3	1	180	172	104.65%	11
Otara Scorpions	8	3	0	5	1	188	236	79.66%	8
Northcote Tigers	8	3	0	5	1	170	222	76.58%	8
Manurewa Marlins	8	1	0	7	1	132	286	46.15%	4
Hibiscus Coast Raiders	8	1	0	7	1	110	320	34.38%	4

=== Section 2 Standings ===
Team	Pld	W	D	L	F	A	%	Pts
Glenora Bears	9	8	0	1	472	76	621.05%	16
Otahuhu Leopards	9	8	0	1	504	140	360.00%	16
Te Atatu Roosters	9	7	0	2	438	121	361.98%	14
Richmond Rovers	9	6	0	3	326	134	243.28%	12
Marist Saints	9	6	0	3	402	166	242.17%	12
Mangere East Hawks	9	3	0	6	212	324	65.43%	6
Pakuranga Jaguars	9	3	0	6	206	316	65.19%	6
Ponsonby (G)	9	3	0	6	228	444	51.35%	6
Papakura Sea Eagles	9	1	0	8	68	550	12.36%	2
Papatoetoe Panthers	9	0	0	9	75	660	11.36%	0

=== Fox Memorial results ===
==== Round 1 ====
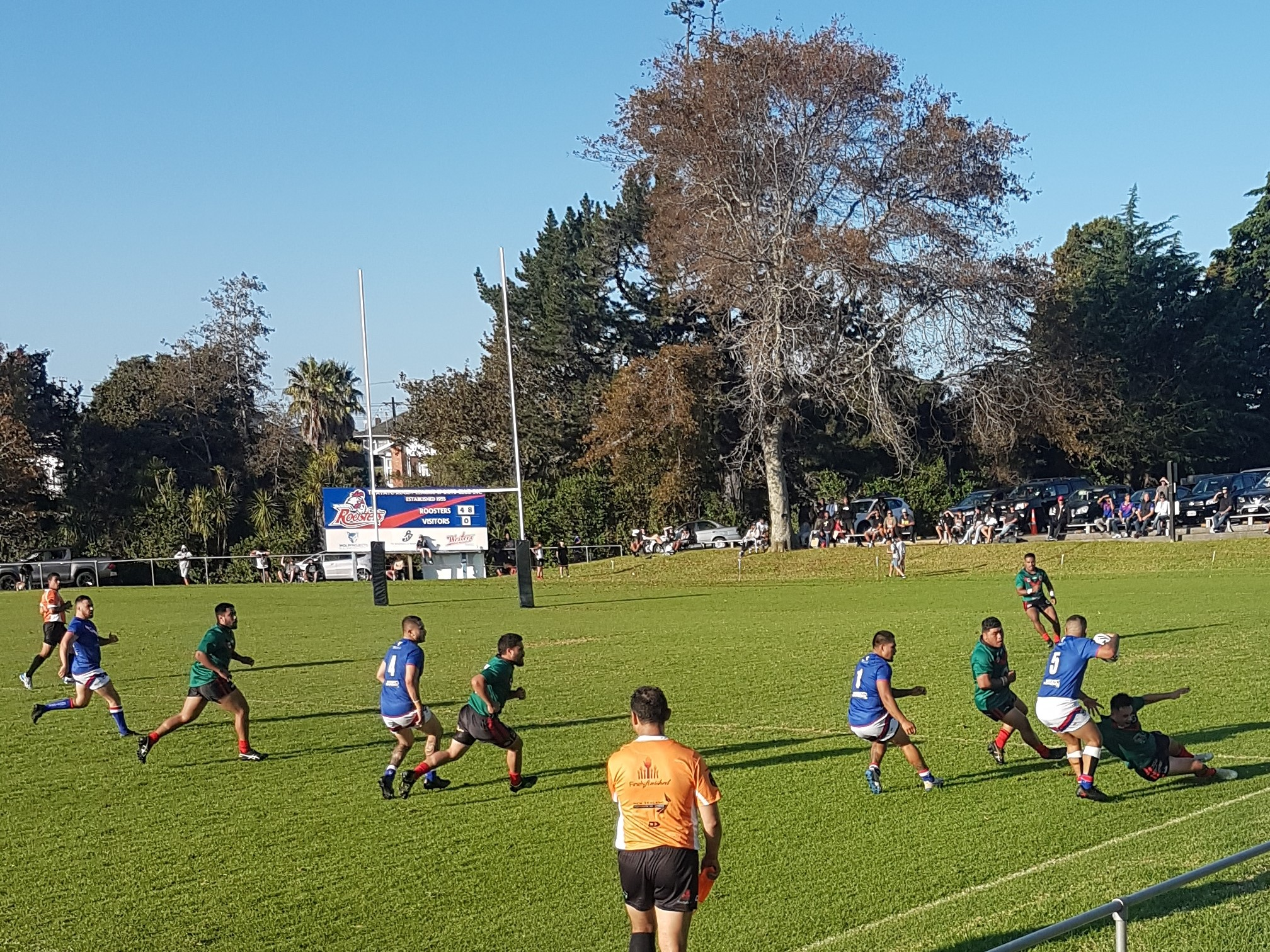
Te Atatu v Mangere East at Jack Colvin Park

Northcote won the Ted Dalton Cup with their 28–22 win over Hibiscus Coast at Stanmore Bay. Pt Chevalier won the Ernie Roiall Memorial Trophy with a 36–22 win at Walker Park over Bay Roskill. The Howick match with Mt Albert at Paparoa Park in Howick was the live streamed match of the round and saw the home team, Howick, win 32–26 with a converted try in the last few minutes to Uila Aiolupo after the scores had been tied 26–26. Te Atatu were captained once more by Api Pēwhairangi who opened the season with a 52–0 win over Mangere East. James Gavet had returned to his junior club Richmond Rovers following time at the Huddersfield Giants. Ponsonby United made their return to the first grade competition for the first time in several seasons. They were well beaten at Murray Halberg Park by Marist by 82 points to 26.

Section 1

7 May	Howick	32–26	Mt Albert	Paparoa Park 1
2:30	Try: Jerome Mika, Anthony Fuimaono, Tahi Baggaley, Michael Laulu, Jethro Friend, Uila Aiolupo; Con: Jordan Papa 2, Klayton Waikato 2		Try: Jesse Amiatu, Johnson Peters, James Aspen, Antonio Fruean, Joseph Polamalu; Con: Johnson Peters 3	Attendance: 300; Referee: Joseph Green

7 May	Pt Chevalier	36–22	Bay Roskill	Walker Park 1
2:30	Try: Patrick Sipley 2		Try: No other scorers submitted	Referee: Viggo Rasmussen

7 May	Hibiscus Coast	22–28	Northcote	Stanmore Bay 1
2:30	Try: Ian Mills, Ngamata Hererahi, Levi Craig, Korey Craig; Con: Matthew Ashe 2, Liam Ackland		Try: Ethan Schaumkel, Huston Holloway, Hemi McCarthy, Trent Schaumkel 2 Con: Martin Watson 4	Referee: Aaronk Kesha

7 May	Manukau	24–12	Manurewa	Moyle Park 1
2:30	Try: McGyver Liu Chan 2, Samuel Nati 2, Paea Folau; Con: Samuel Nati, Carlos Hotene		Try: Henry Dunn, Petelo Havili, Temanu Temanu	Referee: Andrew Harris

Section 2

7 May	Pakuranga	20–32	Richmond	Ti Rakau Park 1
2:30	Try: no scorers submitted			Referee: Brent Newton

7 May	Papakura	36–24	Papatoetoe	Prince Edward Park 1
2:30	Try: Faamanutu Luka 2, Ngarima Pita 2, Gavin Causer, Eteloma Iongi; Con: Gavin Causer 6		Try: Greg Smith, Jordyn Makiha, Peter Vaeagi Eseloma, +2 unnamed try scorers Con: Jordyn Makiha 2	Referee: David Millar

7 May	Te Atatu	52–0	Mangere East	Jack Colvin Park
2:30	Try: Cortez Taulu 3, Charvez Watts Ikitule 3, Khalan Clyde, Royden Gillett 2, Joseph Price, Semisini Lopeti; Con: Kahil Johnson 4			Attendance: 300; Referee: Keven Ah-Ken

7 May	Otahuhu	22–16	Glenora	Bert Henham Park 1
2:30	Try: Phoenix Hunt, Titanian Palei, Fiohiva Siale Faingaa, Mavae Manuika; Con: Lorenzo Filimaua 2 Pen: Lorenzo Filimaua		Try: James Taumata, Bruno Tuivai, Kadiyae Ioka; Con: Philip Kingi, Esom Ioka	Referee: Anthony Eliott

7 May	Marist	82–26	Ponsonby-G	Murray Halberg 1
2:30	Try: Emmanuel Cerei 2, Cyruss Siono Lasalo Payne 4, Elam Payne 2, Anthony Uili 3, Sione Falala, David Leilua, Malachi Tuaoi, Joshua Bradcock-Tipene; Con: Emmanuel Cerei 7, Lewis Sio, Jonpaul White, Anthony Uili 2		Try: Aleki Soonafai, + 4 unnamed tries Con: 3 unnamed conversions	Referee: ?

==== Round 2 ====
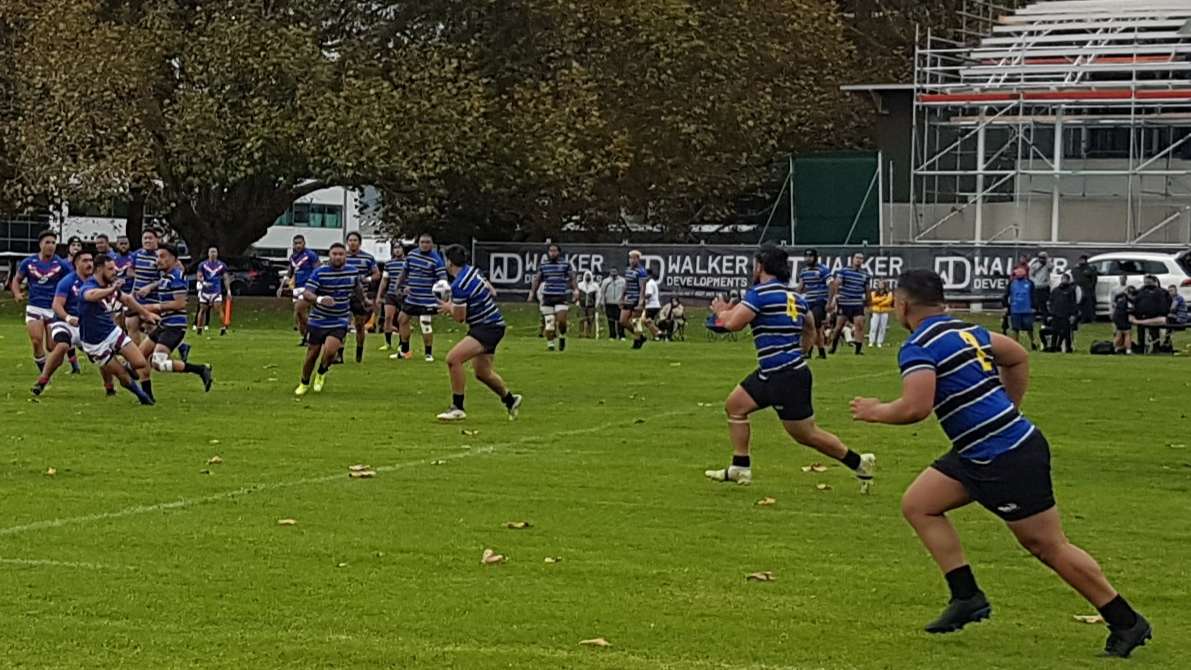
Ponsonby's first home game in the Fox Memorial for several seasons

Round 2 saw 6 of the 9 games won by the away team. Glenora's 88–0 win over Papakura saw Wyatt Rangi run in 5 tries and Kadiyae Ioka kick 10 tries to go with a try for 24 points. Former Newcastle Knights and Gold Coast Titans player Paterika Vaivai scored his first try for Te Atatu in a 66–0 win over Ponsonby who were playing their first home game in the top grade for a few years. Eiden Ackland returned to the Mt Albert side after time spent with the Manly Sea Eagles. He scored a try and kicked 5 conversions in a 30–22 win at the Birkenhead War Memorial against Northcote. Kalani Ili was playing for Mangere East. He had spent 2 seasons with the South Sydney Rabbitohs NYC side and was their captain in 2017.

Section 1

14 May	Bay Roskill	30-28	Howick	Blockhouse Bay Reserve 3
2:30	Try: Jarvis Leaoseve, Justus Leaoseve 2, Timothy Vogel, Joshua Tanielu; Con: Joshua Tanielu 5		Try: Michael Laulu 2, Josh Ka 2, Jethro Friend, unknown try scorer Con: Reuben Tolovae 2	Referee: Anthony Eliott

14 May	Northcote	22-30	Mt Albert	Birkenhead War Memorial 4
2:30	Try: Huston Holloway 2 (37m, 64m), Taylor Daniels (55m), Robert Taupau (72m); Con: Martin Watson 3 (56m, 66m, 74m)		Try: Karl Schaumkel (10m), Eiden Ackland (18m), Antonio Fruean (24m), Kristian Petty (26m), Marcus Fraser (32m); Con: Eiden Ackland 5 (12m, 20m, 26m, 31m, 34m)	Referee: Daniel Caddy

14 May	Otara	10-38	Pt Chevalier	Ngati Otara Park 1
2:30	Try: Unknown (39m), Makalani Hakalo (43m); Con: Unknown (45m)		Try: Brody Tamarua 2 (9m, 65m), Aiden McCarthy (46m), Matthew Whyte (50m), Patrick Sipley (54m), Ollie Tuimavave (70m), Lewis Soosemea (76m); Con: Brody Tamarua 5 (48m, 52m, 55m, 67m, 73m)

14 May	Manurewa	24-30	Hibiscus Coast	Mountfort Park, Jack Shelly
2:30	Try: Genesis Mosogau (2m), Nathan Simmons (12m), Corey Hebden (48m), Rory Marshall Barton (62m), Liam Nielsen (71m); Con: Henry Dunn 2 (14m, 72m)		Try: Korey Craig 3 (21m, 32m, 54m), Devon Tronel-Harris 2 (27m, 36m), Matthew Ashe (38m); Con: Liam Ackland 2 (23m, 55m), Matthew Ashe (29m)	Referee: Leon Williamson

Section 2

14 May	Papatoetoe	16-34	Pakuranga	Kohuora Park 1
2:30	Try: Aneterea Salia-Evaglia 2, Masitati Tuifua; Con: Jordyn Makiha 2		Try: Ofa Pulu, Manu Tukia, Daved Schuster-Overhoff 3, Tupou Lolo; Con: Sude Tavita, Sione Tuimoala, David Schaumkel Otukolo, Tupou Lolo, Uasi Leota	Referee: Aaronk Kesha

14 May	Mangere East	8-44	Richmond	Walter Massey Park 1
2:30	Try: Morgan Misifoa (36m), Junior Moli (53m); Con: Junior Moli (0/2)		Try: Blade Collins-Kamuhemu (1m), Ropati Tupai (13m), Isaiah Sofa (21m), Noro Taikaainga (31m), Tuipala Faaee (46m), Aaron Nootai (59m), Waikare Rautu-Ratima (62m), Michael Lemafa (74m), Amaramo Solomona (77m); Con: Tuipala Faaee 3/8 (1m, 14m, 74m), Waikare Rautu-Ratima (60m)	Attendance: 300; Referee: David Millar

14 May	Glenora	88-0	Papakura	Harold Moody 1
2:30	Try: James Taumata 2 (6m, 41m), Chaz Brown (13m), Wyatt Rangi 5 (24m, 31m, 59m, 68m, 71m), Israel Levi (29m), Esom Ioka (34m), Chaz Brown (38m), Kadiyae Ioka (45m), Daniel Reuelu-Buchanan 2 (49m, 78m), Solomon Vasuvulagi (52m), Bruno Tuivai 2 (64m, 74m); Con: Kadiyae Ioka 10 (14m, 25m, 29m, 32m, 35m, 41m, 50m, 52m, 73m, 80m)			Referee: Keven Ah-Ken

14 May	Ponsonby (G)	0-66	Te Atatu	Victoria Park 1
2:30			Try: Tuteauru Maipi 2 (18m, 75m), Paterika Vaivai (24m), Joseph Price 3 (36m, 42m, 44m), Takitau Mapapalangi (53m), Semisini Lopeti (58m), Khalan Clyde (61m), Cortez Taulu (67m), Charvez Watts Ikitule (71m), Polima Siaki (78m); Con: Api Pēwhairangi 9/11 (19m, 25m, 37m, 43m, 47m, 54m, 60m, 72m, 79m), Charvez Watts Ikutele 0/1	Attendance: 200; Referee: Brent Newton

14 May	Otahuhu	38-20	Marist	Bert Henham Park 1
2:30	Try: Mavae Manuika 3 (1m, 4m, 68m), Titanian Palei 2 (7m, 80m), Shaun Motu-Muavae (16m), Lorenzo Filimaua (31m), Bayley Poto (44m); Con: Lorenzo Filimaua (7m, 69m, 80m)		Try: Lewis Sio (11m), Christopher Sio (24m), Sagele Palaamo (40m), David Leilua (62m); Con: Lewis Sio (40m), Emmanuel Cerei (63m)	Referee: Joseph Green

==== Round 3 ====
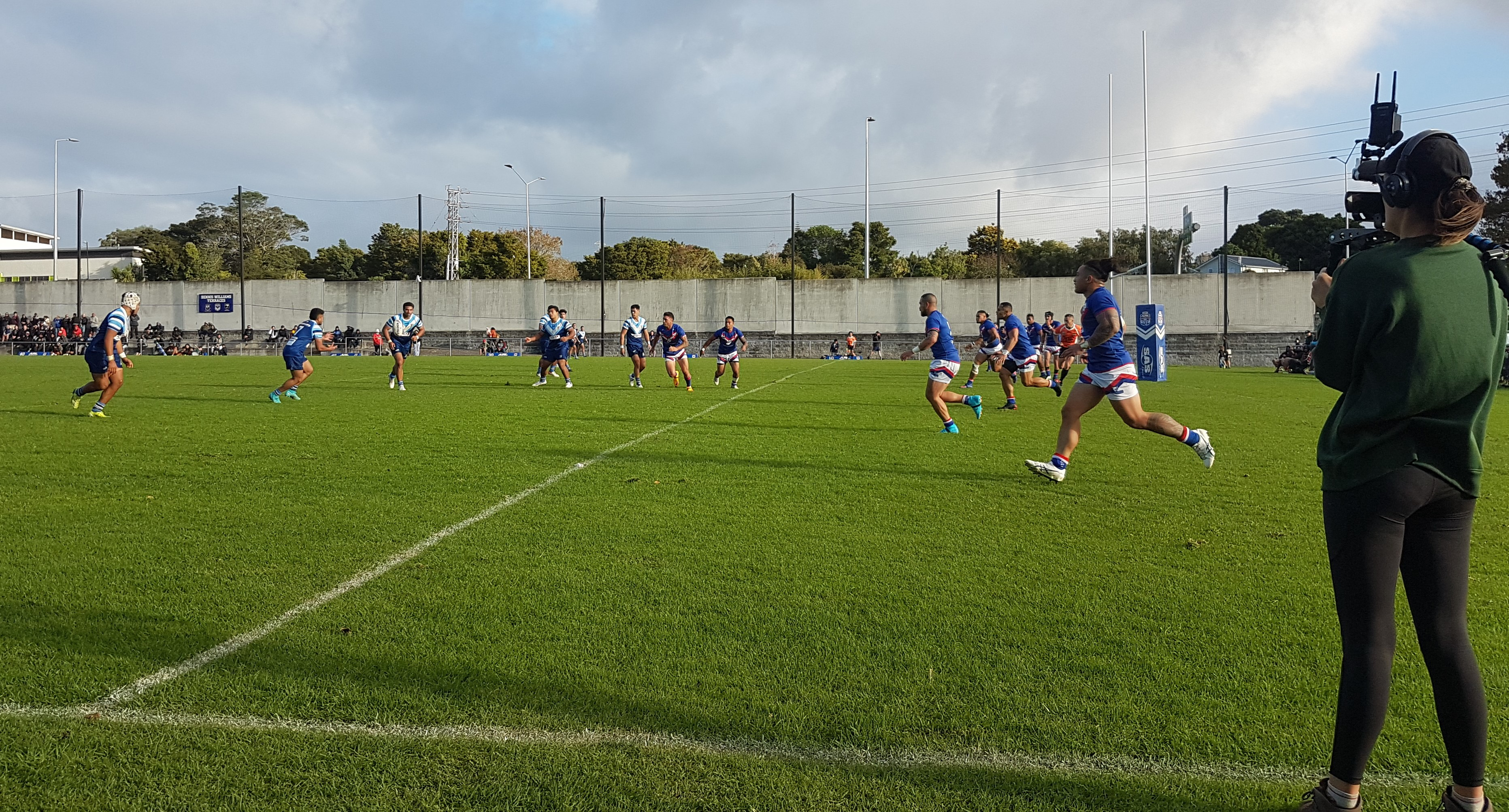
Te Atatu v Otahuhu at Jack Colvin Park

Round 3 saw some enormous scores run up in section 2. Glenora defeated Papatoetoe by the astonishing scoreline of 120 to 0 at Kohuora Park in Papatoetoe. Richmond also trounced Ponsonby 80–6 in Grey Lynn, and Marist made short work of Papakura at Prince Edward Park 84–0. In the live streamed match Te Atatu defeated Otahuhu for the first time in many years 42–22. For Te Atatu, their hooker off the bench, Khalan Clyde, formerly a Northern Sword U18 representative who had attended Westlake Boys High School in 2021 scored his second try of the year. Te Atatu's starting hooker Tuteauru Maipi scored a double which gave him 6 for the season to this point. Otahuhu hooker Phoenix Hunt scored a try in the second half. He was a former Otahuhu College player who had spent time with the South Sydney Rabbitohs NYC team before coming back to Auckland and helping Papakura win the Fox title in 2016 before then returning to his junior Otahuhu club with his brother Jamel Hunt.

Section 1

21 May	Howick	34–6	Northcote	Paparoa Park 1
2:30	Try: Anthony Fuimaono, Alan Niulevu 3, Jerome Mika, Tahi Baggaley, Klayton Waikato; Con: Drew Radich 2, Klayton Waikato		Try: Taylor Daniels; Con: Martin Watson	Referee: Rochelle Tamarua

21 May	Bay Roskill	22–42	Otara	Blockhouse Bay Reserve 3
2:30	Try: Carlos Seuseu, Timothy Vogel, Shaun Tempest; Con: Joshue Tanielu 2		Try: Kruz Tupou, Hansell Semau 2, Tagisia Fulutusi, Taylor Papalii, Makalani Hakalo; Con: Tagisua Fulutusi, Louis Papalii 4	Referee: Daniel Caddy

21 May	Mt Albert	40–4	Manurewa	Fowlds Park 1
2:30	Try: Eiden Ackland 2 (2m, 13m), Blake Wardrope (19m), Mitchell Gemmell (51m), Ethan Jardine-Ngauamo (60m), Rory Ropati (71m), Antonio Fruean (76m); Con: Eiden Ackland 6 (4m, 14m, 53m, 61m, 72m, 77m)		Try: Timothy Tiatia (40m)	Referee: Brent Newton

21 May	Pt Chevalier	40–10	Manukau	Walker Park 1
2:30	Try: Patrick Sipley 2 (16m, 64m), Harley Maynard (26m), Lewis Soosemea (39m), Soane Hufanga (41m), Matthew Whyte (55m), Ollie Tuimavave (70m), Stedman Lefau (78m); Con: Brody Tamarua 4 (18m, 28m, 42m, 65m)		Try: Paea Folau (13m), Ricardo Arama (62m); Con: Samuel Nati (62m)	Referee: Joseph Green

Section 2

21 May	Te Atatu	42–22	Otahuhu	Jack Colvin Park 1
2:30	Try: Tuteauru Maipi 2 (13m, 28m), Joseph Price (18m), Polima Siaki (23m), Khalan Clyde (33m), Fine Vakautakakala (62m), Kahil Johnson (75m); Con: Api Pēwhairangi 7/7 (14m, 19m, 24m, 29m, 34m, 63m, 77m)		Try: Mavae Manuika (37m), Connor Taurua-Purcell (44m), Filipe Vaeafisi (54m), Phoenix Hunt (68m); Con: Lorenzo Filimaua 3/4 (45m, 55m, 69m)	Attendance: 300; Referee: Paki Parkinson

21 May	Pakuranga	24–30	Mangere East	Ti Rakau Park 1
2:30	Try: Suede Tavita (19m), Junior Tuileisu (23m), Manu Tukia (26m), David Fifita (59m), Sione Tuimoala (82m); Con: David Schaumkel 2 (20m, 24m),		Try: Felise Ah Chong (1m), Viliami Vainga (36m), Tyrone Tofilau (50m), Peteroni Lilomaiava (54m), Junior Moli (74m), Jonathan Moevasa (78m); Con: Jonathan Moevasa 3 (37m, 54m, 76m)	Referee: Keven Ah-Ken

21 May	Papatoetoe	0–120	Glenora	Kohuora Park 1
2:30				Referee: David Millar

21 May	Richmond	80–6	Ponsonby	Grey Lynn Park 2
2:30	Try: Tuipala Faaee 2 (7m, 48m), Casey Lafaele (14m), Nicholas Halalilo 2 (17m, 61m), Jeremiah Poutu 2 (20m, 66m), Ropati Tupai 3 (40m, 45m, 78m), Blade Collins-Kamuhemu (54m), Waikare Rautu-Ratima (56m), Amaramo Solomona (64m), Wesley Veikoso (74m); Con: Tevin Arona 3 (15m, 18m, 21m), Tuipala Faaee 6 (41m, 46m, 54m, 64m, 68m, 79m), James Gavet (56m), Unknown 2 (80m, 80m)		Try: Mike Williams (29m); Con: Sene Niupopo (31m)	Referee: Aaronk Kesha

21 May	Papakura	0–84	Marist	Prince Edward Park 1
2:30			Try: Sione Falala (6m), Sagele Palaamo 3 (9m, 26m, 77m), Malachi Tuaoi 2 (15m, 40m), Elam Payne 2 (20m, 57m), Emmanuel Cerei (24m), Johnathan Aumua Feleua-Malio 2 (31m, 37m), Lene Neemia (44m), Xabian Payne (48m), Junior Sami 2 (54m, 60m), Afe Akau’ola (71m); Con: Emmanuel Cerei 3 (10m, 21m, 32m), Lewis Sio 7 (38m, 41m, 45m, 49m, 58m, 61m, 72m)	Referee: Leon Williamson

==== Round 4 ====
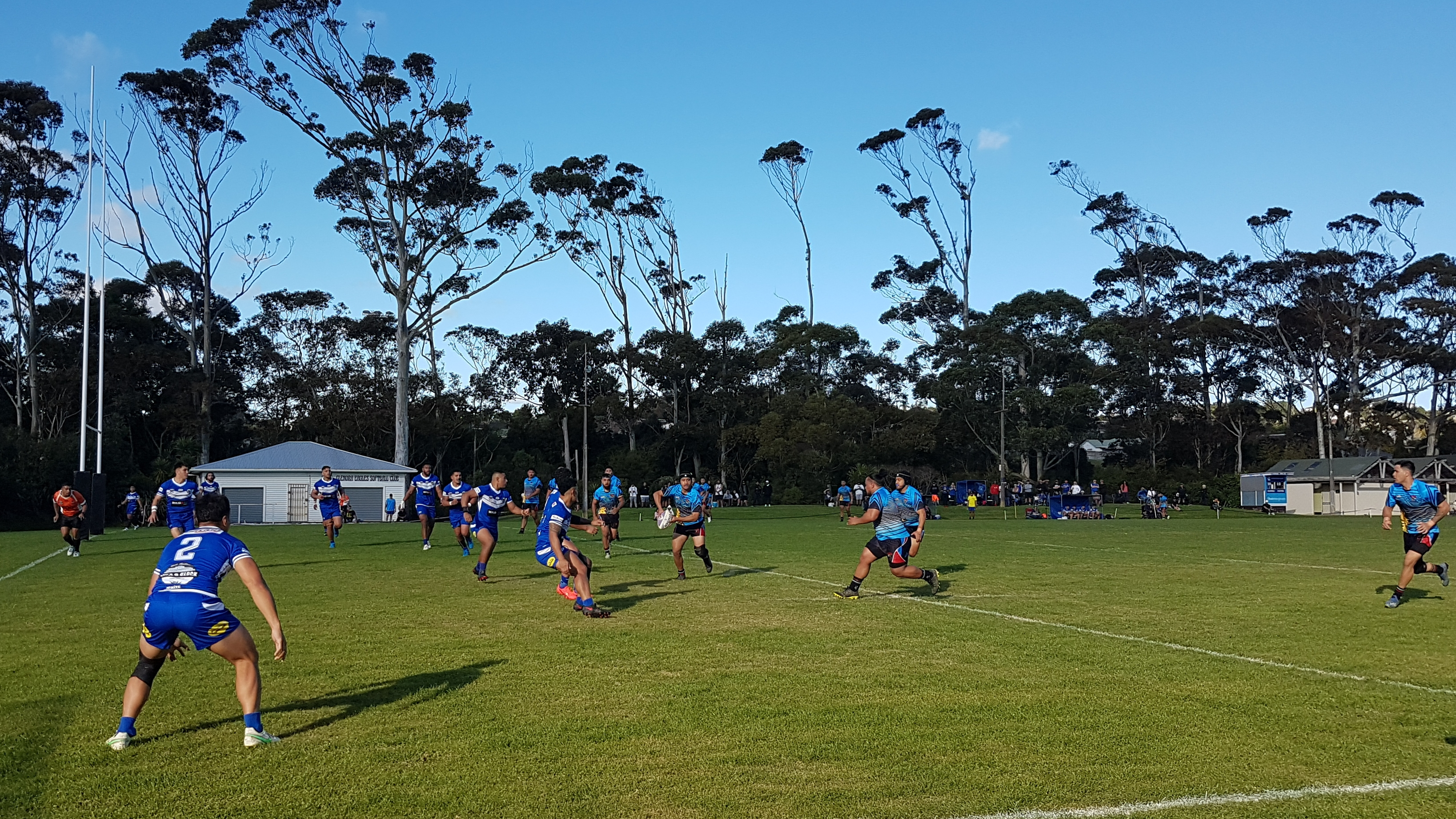
Pakuranga on attack against Glenora at Harold Moody Park in Glen Eden.

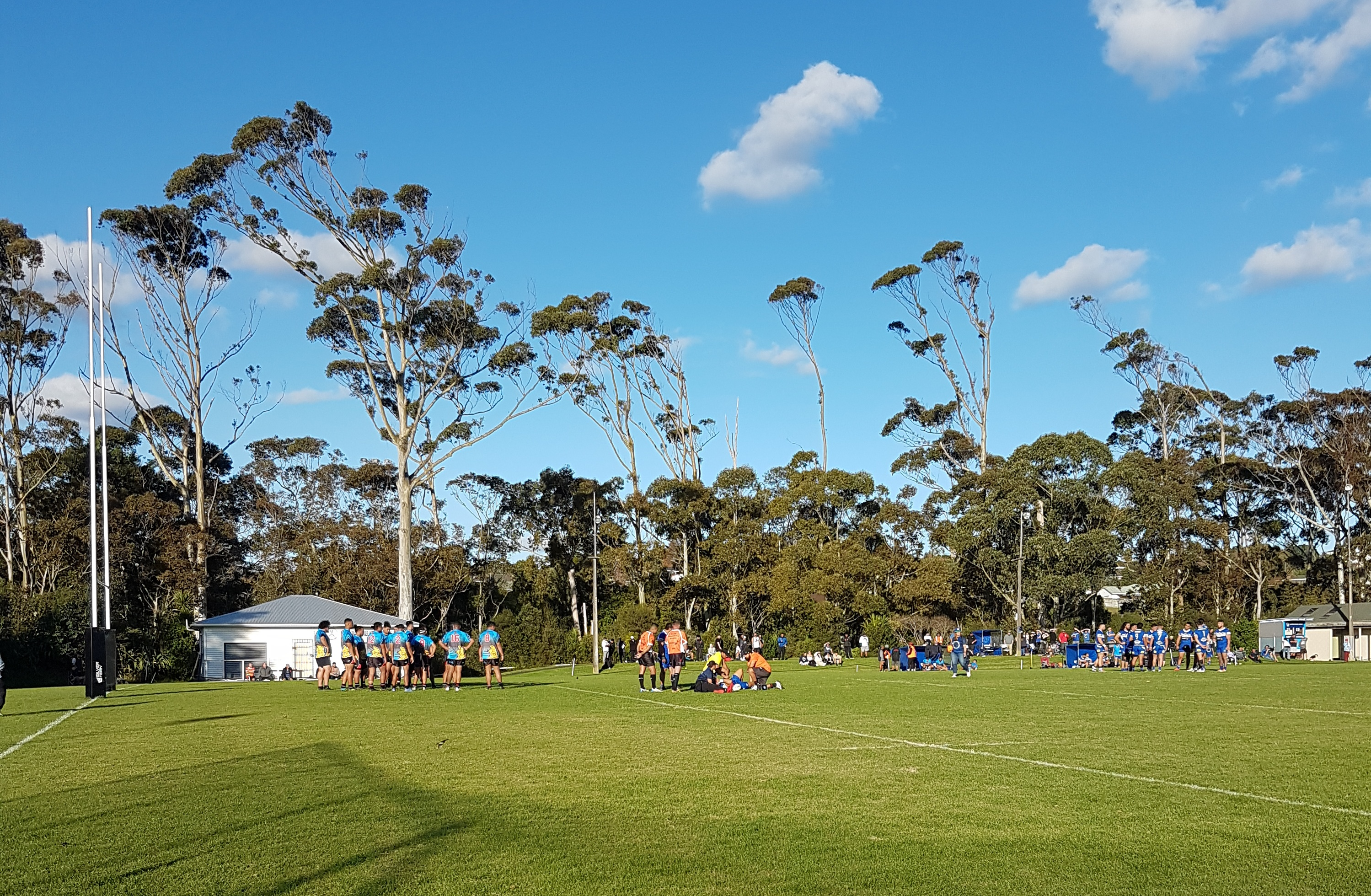
The injured Glenora player

A serious injury to a Glenora player in their match with Pakuranga at Harold Moody Park in Glen Eden saw the match finish just 8 minutes into the second half with the score 34–4 in favour of Glenora. The live streamed match was the clash between Manukau and Bay Roskill at Moyle Park which finished in a thrilling 40–40 draw with Joshua Tanielu kicking a conversion from wide out with time up to lock up the scores. Point Chevalier had an easy 72–8 win over Hibiscus Coast at Walker Park with veteran player Francis Leger scoring 2 tries and kicking 7 conversions. The match between Manurewa and Northcote at Mountford Park was also streamed on Pete's Films and saw the home side Manurewa hang on for a 26–22 win which was their first of the season. The match between Otara and Howick saw the visiting Howick side win 32–20 with 13 unconverted tries scored in the match.

Section 1

28 May	Otara	20-32	Howick	Ngati Otara Park 1
2:30	Try: Leti Fetalaiga, Louis Papalii 3, Manaia Lauaki		Try: Drew Radich 2, Anthony Fuimaono 3, Alan Niulevu, Tayhler Paora, Uila Aiolupo	Referee: Joseph Green

28 May	Manurewa	26-22	Northcote	Mountfort Park, Jack Shelly
2:30	Try: Daylee Dutton (23m), Timothy Tiatia (41m), Isileli Matalave (49m), Corey Hebden (56m), Rory Marshall Barton (62m); Con: Kikorangi Puhipi-Hibbs 2 (25m, 41m); Pen: Timothy Tiatia (72m)		Try: Trent Schaumkel (31m), Alvin Tu'ione (34m), Huston Holloway (66m), Martin Watson (77m); Con: Martin Watson 3 (32m, 36m, 66m)	Referee: Leon Williamson

28 May	Manukau	40-40	Bay Roskill	Moyle Park 1
2:30	Try: McGyver Liu Chan 2 (16m, 68m), Samuel Nati 2 (29m, 43m), Jayjay Sheung Fuk (62m), Paea Folau (71m), Joel Taime (78m); Con: Samuel Nati 6/7 (37m, 44m, 62m, 69m, 71m, 79m)		Try: Joel Leaoseve (4m), Jonny Wea (33m), Ariki Honetana-Paea 2 (39m, 54m), Victor Freeth (51m), Joshua Tanielu (65m), Nixon Leaso (80m); Con: Joshua Tanielu 6/7 (34m, 40m, 51m, 55m, 66m, 80m)	Attendance: 250; Referee: Anthony Eliott

28 May	Pt Chevalier	72-8	Hibiscus Coast	Walker Park 1
2:30	Try: Lewis Soosemea 2 (3m, 53m), Sioeli Makaui 2 (10m, 19m), Harley Maynard (22m), Ollie Tuimavave (27m), Tevita Latu (38m), Arden McCarthy (46m), Siapo Pasene 3 (48m, 62m, 65m), Francis Leger 2 (59m, 76m), Matthew Whyte (68m); Con: Francis Leger 7 (4m, 12m, 20m, 23m, 28m, 39m, 47m), Dylan Tavita (69m)		Try: Devon Tronel-Harris (14m), Mavae Muru Teutau (32m)	Referee: Aaronk Kesha

Section 2

28 May	Glenora	34-4	Pakuranga	Harold Moody Park 1
2:30	Try: Kadiyae Ioka (6m), Clive Tuifua (15m), Wyatt Rangi (18m), Bruno Tuivai 2 (21m, 33m), Simon Luafalealo (40m), Chase Bernard (42m); Con: Phillip Kingi 2/3 (7m, 19m), Chaz Brown 1/3 (42m)		Try: Manu Tukia (45m); Con: David Schaumkel Otukolo 0/1	Attendance: 200; Referee: Keven Ah-Ken

28 May	Ponsonby	36-30	Mangere East	Victoria Park 1
2:30	Try: Mike Williams 2, Timor Reese Williams 4, Damon Abbey; Con: Taani Fangupo 4		Try: Felise Ah Chong 3, Jonathan Moevasa, Siuesita Fonua, Benjamin Letoga; Con: Jonathan Moevasa 3	Referee: David Millar

28 May	Marist	64-4	Papatoetoe	Murray Halberg Park 1
2:30	Try: Takaia Williams 2 (2m, 28m), Lene Williams (10m), Anthony Uili 2 (20m, 31m), Letuia Eliu (34m), Doux Kauhiva (37m), Emmanuel Cerei (48m), Maclean Uhamaka (53m), Sagele Palaamo (57m), Johnathan Aumua Falelua-Malio 2 (68m, 78m), Jonpaul White (76m); Con: Lewis Sio 6 (21m, 29m, 32m, 35m, 38m, 69m)		Try: Unknown (44m)	Referee: Brent Newton

28 May	Otahuhu	30-16	Richmond	Bert Henham Park 1
2:30	Try: John Wesley Tauti, Unknown try, Emeliano Mikaele, Connor Taurua-Purcell 2 Con: Lorenzo Filimaua 5		Try: Amaramo Solomona, James Gavet, Hawaiiki Anandale; Con: Tuipala Faaee 2	Referee: Daniel Caddy

28 May	Papakura	0-46	Te Atatu	Prince Edward Park 1
2:30			Try: Peter Oliveti (8m), Reece Joyce (14m), Polima Siaki 2 (23m, 54m), Kahil Johnson (47m), Khalan Clyde (51m), Paorastarr Manning (64m), Takitau Mapapalangi (70m), Peauope Suli (79m); Con: Api Pēwhairangi 5/9 (9m, 15m, 24m, 52m, 73m)	Referee: Andrew Harris

==== Round 5 ====
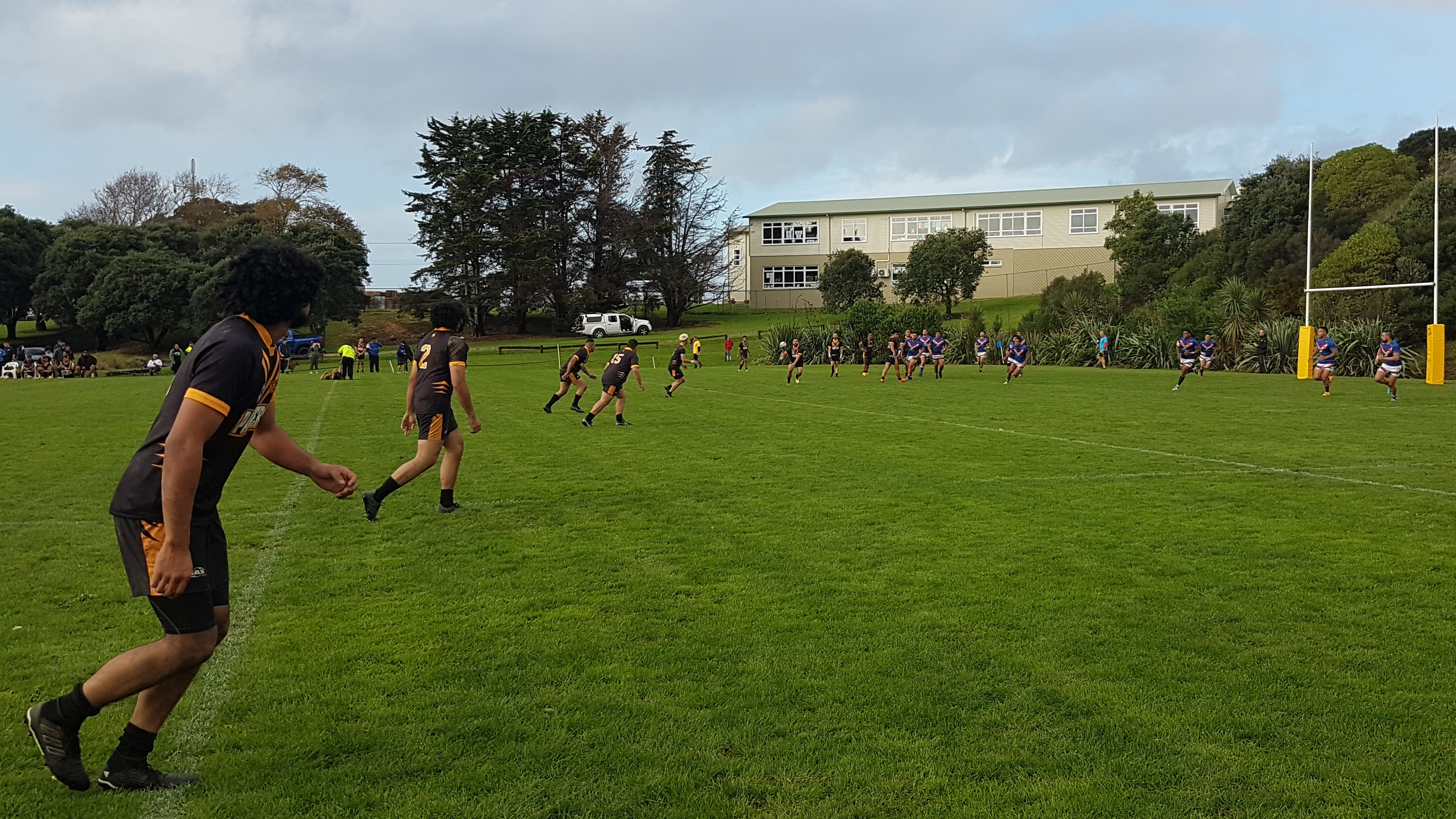
Papatoetoe on attack against Te Atatu at Kohuora Park in Papatoetoe, with Jordyn Makiha about to receive a pass

Philip Kingi played his 150th game for Glenora in their match with Marist and he kicked a conversion in their 22–12 win. Papatoetoe suffered another heavy defeat, losing to Te Atatu by the unusual score of 94 to 1. Papatoetoe's standoff Jordyn Makiha slotted a drop goal midway through the second half to make the score 70–1. He attempted another on full time but it was partially charged down and the match finished shortly after. For Te Atatu, Kahil Johnson scored 4 tries and kicked 2 goals, while Api Pēwhairangi scored 1 try and kicked 10 conversions from 12 attempts. Hikoirangi Paki scored 3 tries on debut. Nicholas Malalilo scored a hat trick in Richmond's 56–0 win over Papakura with Hawaiiki Annandale converting 6 of their 11 tries. Pakuranga secured their second win of the season when late tries to Boss Rolleston took them from 22 to 20 down to a 28–22 win. Earlier Manu Tukia had grabbed a hat trick while Timor Reese Williams had done the same for Ponsonby. The live stream match saw Pt Chevalier maintain their unbeaten record with a comfortable 42–16 win over Mt Albert at Fowld's Park with Lewis Soosemea and Saula Solomona both scoring 2 tries each. The win meant that Pt Chevalier retained the Lani Latoa Memorial Cup. Latoa had played for both clubs but tragically died in 1995 during a game at Carlaw Park between North Harbour Sea Eagles and the Auckland Warriors reserves. He fell on the ball and broke his windpipe. Sione Feao and Fiohiva Siale Faingaa also scored doubles in Otahuhu's 38–16 win over Mangere East at Walter Massey Park.

Section 1

11 June	Howick	38-18	Manurewa	Paparoa Park 1
2:30	Try: Trent Bishop (8m), Uila Aiolupo (20m), Josh Ka (26m), Alan Niulevu 2 (41m, 43m), Rahs Tuivai-Lopa (47m), Tony Tuia (81m); Con: Klayton Waikato 5 (9m, 21m, 41m, 44m, 82m),		Try: Samuel So'oalo 3 (14m, 30m, 33m), Tane Wiki (66m); Con: Kikorangi Puhipi-Hibbs (31m)	Referee: Viggo Rasmussen

11 June	Otara	22-24	Manukau	Ngati Otara Park 1
2:30	Try: Storm Tanaki 2, Stanley Tuipulotu, Jaycob Ru; Con: Louis Papalii 3		Try: Desmond Toofohe, Tamore Nati, Ricardo Arama, McGyver Liu Chan; Con: Samuel Nati 4	Referee: Daniel Caddy

11 June	Bay Roskill	38-14	Hibiscus Coast	Blockhouse Bay Reserve 3
2:30	Try: Justus Leaoseve, Renouf Oge, Jerome Vogel 3, Joshua Tanielu, Ezra Vogel, Jarvis Leaoseve; Con: Joshua Tanielu 3		Try: Ian Mills, Korey Craig, Reece Brogden; Con: Liam Ackland	Referee: Joseph Green

11 June	Mt Albert	16-42	Pt Chevalier	Fowlds Park 1
2:30	Try: Johnson Peters (14m), Isaiah Vagana (43m), Eiden Ackland (73m); Con: Eiden Ackland 2/3 (16m, 74m)		Try: Lewis Soosemea 2 (6m, 62m), Sioeli Makaui (19m), Saula Solomona 2 (30m, 78m), Matthew Whyte (38m), Stedman Lefau (58m), Arden McCarthy (66m); Con: Francis Leger 3/6 (20m, 32m, 59m), Brody Tamarua 2/2 (64m, 68m)	Referee: Anthony Eliott

Section 2

11 June	Pakuranga	28-22	Ponsonby (G)	Ti Rakau Park 1
2:30	Try: Manu Tukia 3 (8m, 47m, 52m), Taniela Tomasi (24m), Boss Rolleston 2 (68m, 72m); Con: David Schaumkel Otukolo 2 (9m, 25m)		Try: Timor Reese Williams 3 (19m, 32m, 56m), Mike Williams (34m); Con: Taani Fangupo 2 (33m, 58m)	Referee: Aaronk Kesha

11 June	Glenora	22-12	Marist	Harold Moody Park 1
2:30	Try: Mose Esera (8m), Chaz Brown 2 (14m, 76m), Kouma Samson (39m), Israel Levi (71m); Con: Philip Kingi 1/5 (9m)		Try: Anthony Uili (29m), Maclean Uhamaka (64m); Con: Doux Kauhiva 2/2 (30m, 66m)	Referee: Paki Parkinson

11 June	Mangere East	16-44	Otahuhu	Walter Massey Park 1
2:30	Try: Viliami Vainga (8m), Junior Moli (27m), Morgan Misifoa (77m); Con: Gavin Patuki (10m), Tyrone Tofilau (78m)		Try: Sione Feao 2 (14m, 73m), Fiohiva Siale Faingaa 2 (21m, 55m), Lorenzo Filimaua (48m), Fangupo Toai, Emeliano Mikaele (58m), Richard Toai (68m); Con: Lorenzo Filimaua 6 (22m, 57m, 60m, 69m, 74m, +1)	Referee: Leon Williamson

11 June	Papatoetoe	1-94	Te Atatu	Kohuora Park 1
2:30	Drop: Jordyn Makiha		Try: Hikoirangi Paki 3 (1m, 4m, 32m), Fine Vakautakakala 2 (7m, 49m), Kahil Johnson 4 (10m, 15m, 35m, 69m), Delaney Chaney 2 (17m, 63m), Royden Gillett (24m), Takitau Mapapalangi (29m), Mosese Tuivoavoa 2 (40m, 66m), Api Pēwhairangi (74m), Tyson Davies (77m); Con: Api Pēwhairangi 10/12 (2m, 6m, 8m, 11m, 16m, 18m, 30m, 33m, 75m, 77m), Kahil Johnson 2/3 (50m, 64m), Hikoiangi Paki 0/1	Referee: Keven Ah-Ken

11 June	Richmond	56-0	Papakura	Grey Lynn Park 2
2:30	Try: Blade Collins-Kamuhemu (4m), James Gavet (8m), Nicholas Halalilo 3 (11m, 40m, 66m), Silima Tia (18m), Braedyn Strang 2 (23m, 80m), Jeremiah Poutu 2 (42m, 75m), Isaiah Sofa (52m); Con: Hawaiiki Annandale 6 (1m, 10m, 13m, 19m, 40m, 44m)			Referee: Brent Newton

==== Round 6 ====
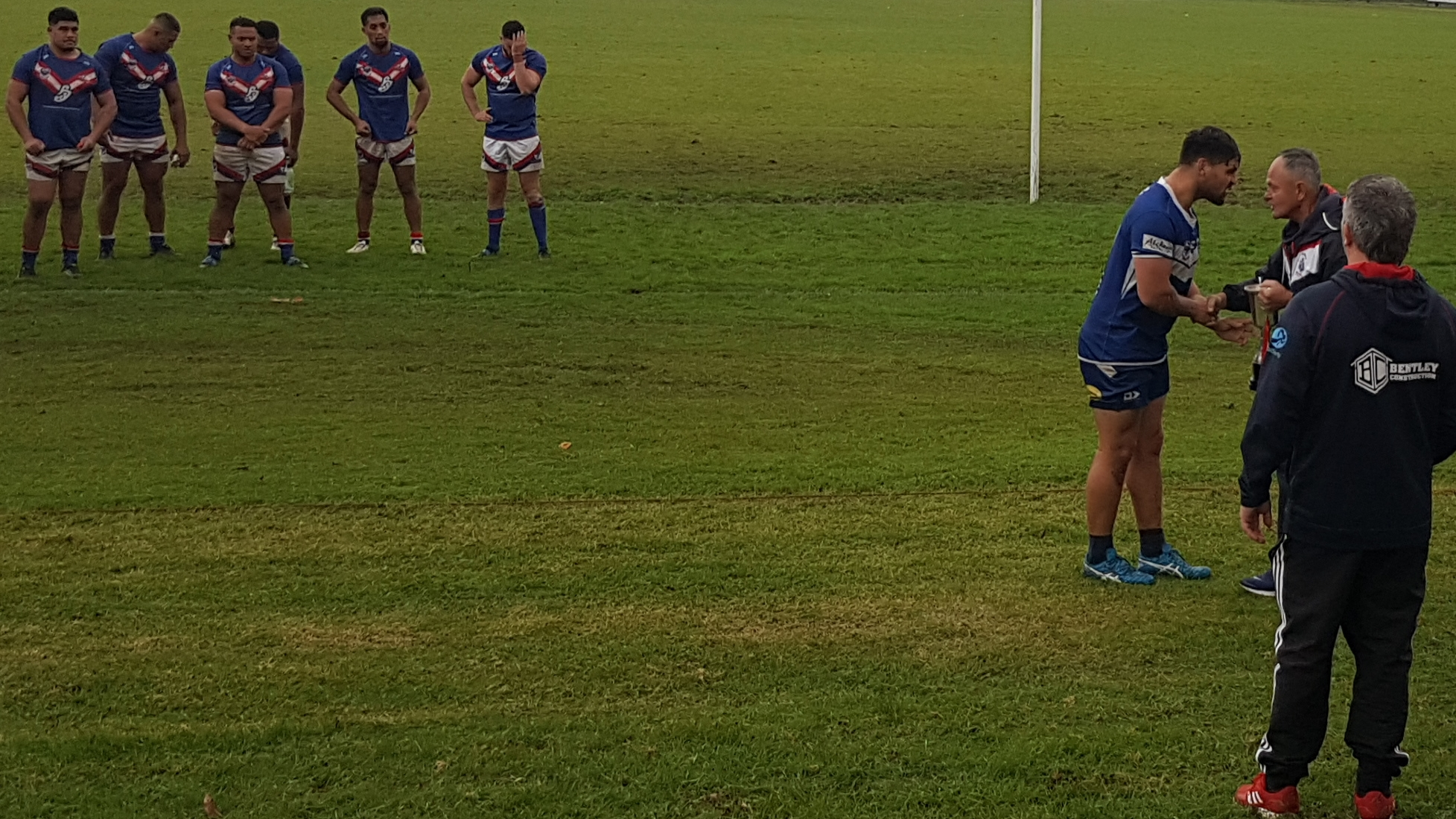
Kouma Samson receiving the Dennis Williams Cup from Dennis Williams

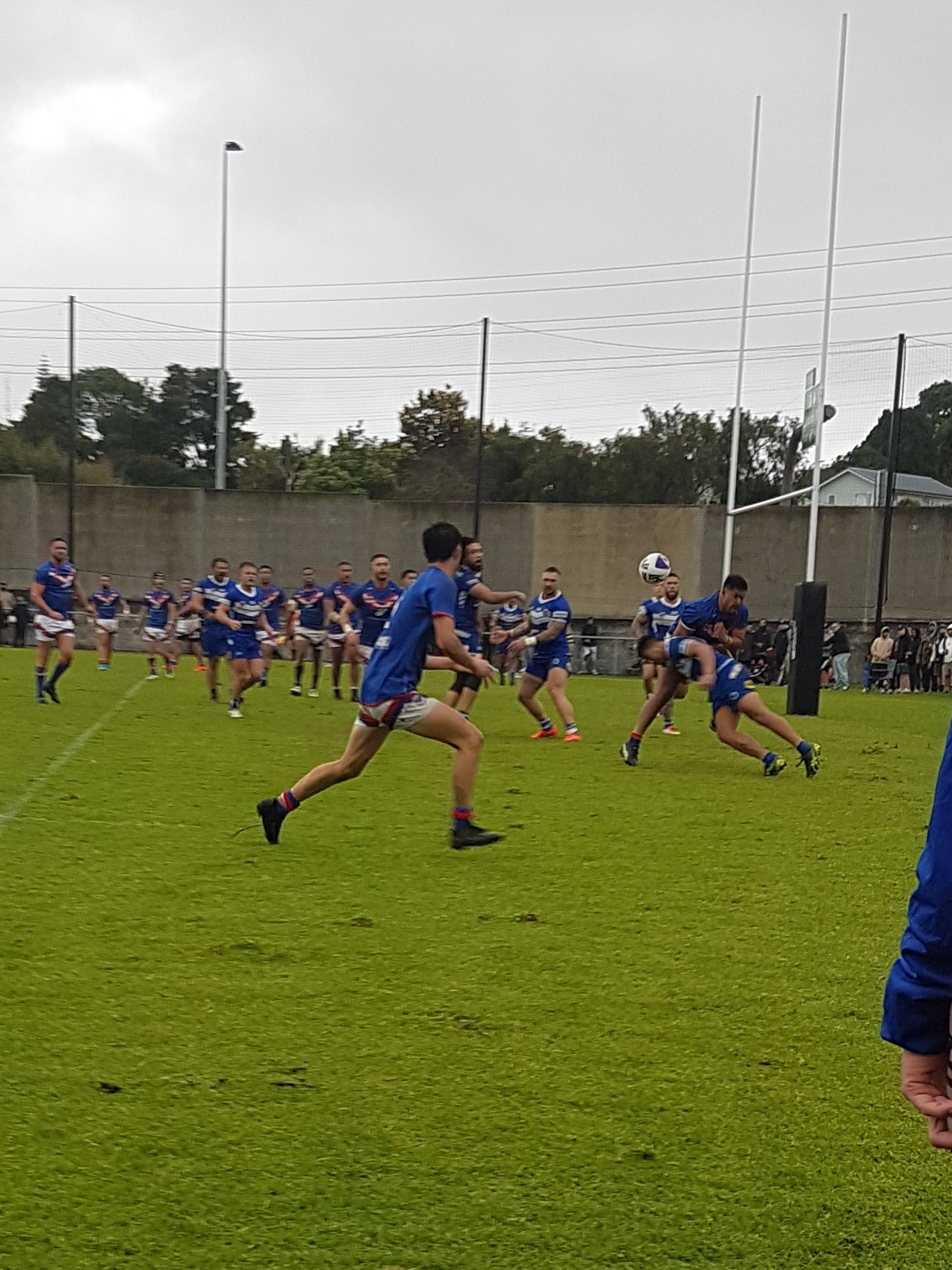
Hikoirangi Paki scoring Te Atatu's sole try

The most anticipated match of round 6 was the match between Te Atatu and Glenora at Jack Colvin Park in Te Atatu for the Denis Williams Cup. New Zealand international Dennis Williams played the majority of his career with Te Atatu but did enjoy a successful season with Glenora as well. Unfortunately it was not as tightly fought as expected and Glenora got on top early and controlled the match to win 32–6. Dennis Williams presented the trophy named in his honour to the Glenora captain Kouma Samson. Pt Chevalier beat Northcote easily at Walker Park 52 to 16 with Matthew Whyte scoring a hat trick and Brody Tamarua scoring twice to go along with 4 conversions. The live streamed match was Marist against Pakuranga which saw Marist win 50–12 with Sagele Palaamo scoring 3 tries and Doux Kauhiva kicking 6 conversions for the winners. Otahuhu beat Ponsonby 68–8 with William Stowers scoring 2 tries and kicking 7 goals for a personal tally of 22 points. Papakura scored their first points in 5 games with a converted try in a 42–6 loss to Mangere East. Brody Tamarua scored twice and kicked 4 conversions in Pt Chevalier's 52–16 win over Northcote. For Mt Albert in their 34–30 win over Bay Roskill, Eiden Ackland scored 2 tries and kicked 5 goals.

Section 1

18 June	Mt Albert	34-30	Bay Roskill	Fowld's Park 1
2:30	Try: Johnson Peters (8m), Isaiah Vagana (17m, 24m), Eiden Ackland 2 (41m, 70m), Rory Ropati (54m); Con: Eiden Ackland 5 (9m, 17m, 24m, 42m, 71m)		Try: Ariki Honetana-Paea 2 (3m, 47m), Jerome Vogel (13m), Xavier Tutaki (31m), Joel Leaoseve (49m), Mackenzie Kata (63m); Con: Joshua Tanielu 3 (14m, 51m, 64m)	Referee: Daniel Caddy

18 June	Manukau	10-22	Howick	Moyle Park 1
2:30	Try: Siosifa Tauataina, McGyver Liu Chan; Con: Samuel Nati		Try: Hurricain Roberts 2, Brandon Lee 2 Con: Klayton Waikato 3	Referee: Joseph Green

18 June	Hibiscus Coast	10-26	Otara	Stanmore Bay 1
2:30				Referee: Keven Ah-Ken

18 June	Pt Chevalier	52-16	Northcote	Walker Park 1
2:30	Try: Matthew Whyte 3 (15m, 54m, 72m), Brody Tamarua 2 (22m, 61m), Lewis Soosemea (34m), Harley Maynard (41m), Tane Rapira (46m), Francis Leger (64m), Siapo Pasene (79m); Con: Brody Tamarua 4 (17m, 62m, 65m, 73m), Francis Leger 2 (42m, 47m)		Try: Neihana Walters (39m), Hemi McCarthy (68m), Alvin Tu'ione (76m); Con: Martin Watson 2 (39m, 70m)	Referee: Viggo Rasmussen

Section 2

18 June	Te Atatu	6-32	Glenora	Jack Colvin Park 1
2:30	Try: Hikoirangi Paki (26m); Con: Api Pēwhairangi (27m)		Try: Kouma Samson 2 (21m, 68m), Mosese Faeamani (29m), Simon Luafalealo (35m), Chase Bernard (42m), Mose Esera (48m); Con: Mose Esera 4 (21m, 30m, 42m, 70m),	Attendance: 600; Referee: Anthony Eliott

18 June	Marist	50-12	Pakuranga	Murray Halberg Park 1
2:30	Try: Sagele Palaamo (3m), Lewis Sio (19m), Lene Neemia 2 (23m, 51m), Maclean Uhamaka (31m), Afe Akau'ola (55m), Cyruss Sione Lasalo Payne (58m), Christopher Sio (69m), Jonpaul White (75m); Con: Doux Kauhiva 6 (5m, 20m, 24m, 53m, 56m, 60m), David Leilua (76m)		Try: Unknown (14m), Unknown (65m); Con: Unknown (15m), Unknown (66m)

18 June	Otahuhu	68-8	Ponsonby (G)	Bert Henham Park 1
2:30	Try: Siona Tesese (1m), Shaun Moti-Muavae (8m), Sione Feao (15m), Mavae Manuika 2 (23m, 40m), Maddison Tekeu (29m), John Wesley Tauti (46m), 2 Emeliano Mikaele 2 (51m, 67m), Fangupo Fotu (54m), William Stowers 2 (57m, 69m), Fiohiva Siala Faingaa (65m); Con: Lorenzo Filimaua (27m), William Stowers 7 (29m, 47m, 52m, 55m, 58m, 68m, 69m)		Try: Octavius Toniu (61m), Li Taufoou (74m)	Referee: Andrew Harris

18 June	Papakura	6-42	Mangere East	Prince Edward Park 1
2:30	Try: Unknown (34m); Con: Amoi Singh (35m)		Try: Tyrone Tofilau (2m), Junior Moli 2 (7m, 28m), Siuesita Fonua (15m), Morgan Misifoa 2 (22m, 61m), Viliami Vainga 2 (45m, 79m), Ladejo Teau (75m); Con: Howard Brown 2 (9m, 16m), Junior Moli (76m)	Referee: Aaronk Kesha

18 June	Richmond	52-0	Papatoetoe	Grey Lynn Park 2
2:30	Try: Nicholas Halalilo 2 (9m, 26m), Ronnie David (22m), Kameli Vasu (39m), Isaiah Sofa (45m), Reiley Satele (49m), Delano Atai (59m), Carlos Henry (66m), Unknown (76m), Unknown (80m); Con: Unknown (11m, 22m, 27m, 45m), Isaac Fitzgerald 2 (59m, 78m)			Referee: Brent Newton

==== Round 7 ====
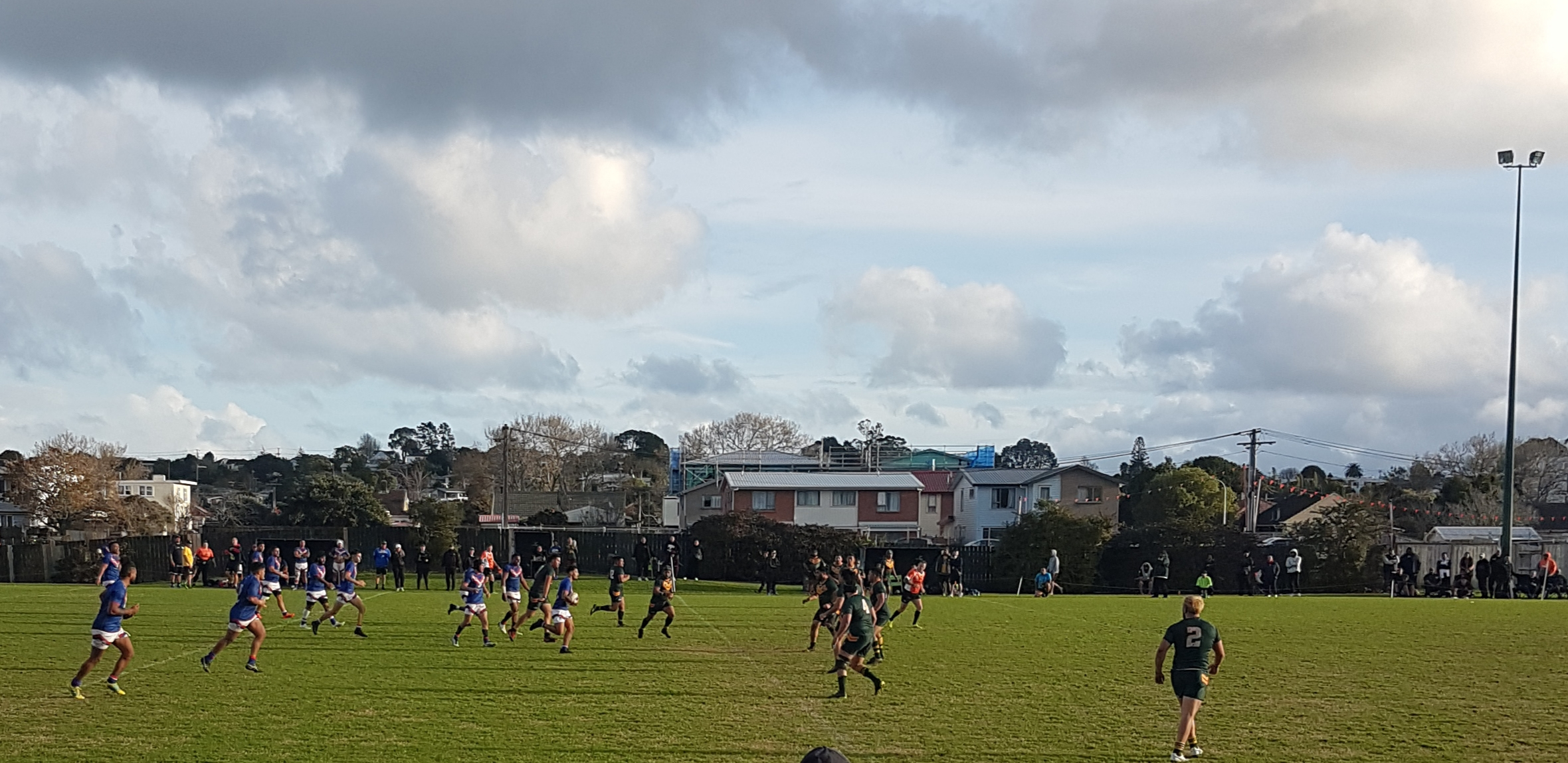
Action from Marist v Te Atatu at Murray Halberg Park in Mt Albert. Marist won 36–28.

The round started early with Ponsonby and Papakura playing on Matariki Day at Sunnynook Park. Ponsonby won easily by 52 points to 8. Levi Helleur-Atiga secured a hat trick while Taani Fangupo converted 8 of their 9 tries. Pt Chevalier had a big 58–10 win over Manurewa with Mathew Whyte scoring 4 tries. Eiden Ackland scored 3 tries and kicked 8 conversions in Mt Albert's 56–14 win over Otara. In the live streamed match Glenora had a comfortable 36–4 win over Richmond at Harold Moody Park. Chase Bernard scored a double, as did Mose Esera who also converted 4 of their 7 tries. Bay Roskill won a tight contest over Northcote 26–22. The scores were locked at 22-all before Ben Henry kicked 2 late penalties to secure a vital win for the Vikings. Pakuranga put up a plucky effort against Otahuhu with Molisoni Faiva scoring a hat trick in a 36–22 defeat. Marist handed Te Atatu their second consecutive defeat with a 36–28 win at Murray Halberg Park. Te Atatu led by 10 in the second half before 18 unanswered points to Marist including a 60-metre try to Doux Kauhiva sealed the match. Kauhiva also kicked 5 conversions and a penalty. Te Atatu were missing regular halves Api Pēwhairangi, who was out of Auckland, and Reece Joyve who was in Australia playing for the Cook Islands against Samoa.

Section 1

25 June	Manukau	50-6	Hibiscus Coast	Moyle Park 1
2:30	Try: Hayden Pokai 2 (12m, 38m), William Tere (16m), Tamore Nati (25m), El Brandon Togiatolu Togiamua 2 (27m, 43m), Paea Folau 3 (49m, 52m, 59m), Koronato John (77m); Con: Samuel Nati 5 (12m, 17m, 38m, 60m, 77m)		Try: Devon Tronel-Harris (67m); Con: Mavae Muru Teutau (67m)	Referee: Keven Ah-Ken

25 June	Manurewa	10-58	Pt Chevalier	Mountfort Park: Jack Shelley
2:30	Try: Henry Dunn, Sam Neufeldt; Con: Kikorangi Puhipi-Hibbs		Try: Siapo Pasene, Francis Leger 2, Matthew Whyte 4, Saula Solomona, Harley Maynard, Patrick Sipley, Ollie Tuimavave; Con: Francis Leger 7	Referee: Andrew Harris

25 June	Otara	14-56	Mt Albert	Ngati Otara Park 1
2:30	Try: Manaia Lauaki (7m), Storm Tanaki (17m), Robert-Alan Fatialofa (55m); Con: Louis Papalii (57m)		Try: Tyrall Waitapu (3m), Eiden Ackland 3 (22m, 42m, 69m), Johnson Peters 2 (29m, 32m), Kristian Petty (38m), Thomas Beale 2 (45m, 62m), Rory Ropati (76m); Con: Eiden Ackland 8 (4m, 23m, 30m, 33m, 45m, 47m, 63m, 70m)	Referee: Anthony Elliot

25 June	Northcote	22-26	Bay Roskill	Birkenhead War Memorial 4
2:30	Try: Hemi McCarthy (1m), James Waterson (11m), Huston Holloway (30m, 54m); Con: Martin Watson (2m, 31m, 55m)		Try: Nixon Leaso (6m), Mackenzie Kata (16m), Ariki Honetana-Paea (48m), Renouf Oge (66m); Con: Joshua Tanielu (16m, 49m), Jerome Vogel (67m); Pen: Ben Henry (74m, 77m)	Referee: Brent Newton

Section 2

25 June	Pakuranga	22-36	Otahuhu	Ti Rakau Park 1
2:30	Try: Molisoni Faiva 4 (1m, 78m, 78m, 80m), Samuel Fonua (64m); Con: Molisoni Faiva 3 (3m, 79m, 80m)		Try: Jamel Hunt (6m), Mavae Manuika 3 (11m, 42m, 48m), Phoenix Hunt 2 (17m, 58m), Antonio Adams (72m); Con: William Stowers 4 (7m, 18m, 43m, 48m)	Referee: ?

25 June	Marist	36-28	Te Atatu	Murray Halberg Park 1
2:30	Try: Sione Falala 2 (1m, 40m), Johnathon Aumua Falelua-Malio (13m), Jonpaul White (56m), Christopher Sio (61m), Doux Kauhiva (77m); Con: Doux Kauhiva 5 (3m, 14m, 41m, 57m, 78m); Pen: Doux Kauhiva (67m)		Try: Joseph Price (9m), Takitau Mapapalangi (18m), Charvez Watts Ikitule (30m), Cortez Taulu (34m), Naiki Paniora (49m); Con: Kahil Johnson 4 (10m, 20m, 31m, 51m)	Referee: Leon Williamson

24 June	Ponsonby (G)	52-8	Papakura	Sunnynook Park 1
2:30	Try: Timor Reese Williams, Li Taufoou, Mike Williams, Levi Helleur-Atiga 3, Octavius Toniu 2, Mitchell Elima; Con: Taani Fangupo 8		Try: Jason Tou, Anesi Siupolu	Referee: Nigel Williams

25 June	Glenora	36-4	Richmond	Harold Moody Park 1
2:30	Try: Wyatt Rangi (36m), Kouma Samson (40m), Chase Bernard 2 (47m, 52m), Israel Levi (61m), Mose Esera 2 (66m, 76m); Con: Mose Esera 4 (38m, 40m, 48m, 54m)		Try: Jeremiah Poutu (14m)	Referee: Aaronk Kesha

25 June	Mangere East	66-16	Papatoetoe	Walter Massey Park 1
2:30	Try: no scorers submitted		Try: no scorers submitted	Referee: Karl Vasau

==== Round 8 ====
Hibiscus Coast hosted the Howick Hornets at Stanmore Bay in their 40th anniversary celebration day. The match was also the live streamed match of the round with Lewin Hudson and Wade Brunsdon in commentary. The Raiders put up a spirited showing against the second placed Hornets with Ian Mills scoring first, before eventually going down 22–12.

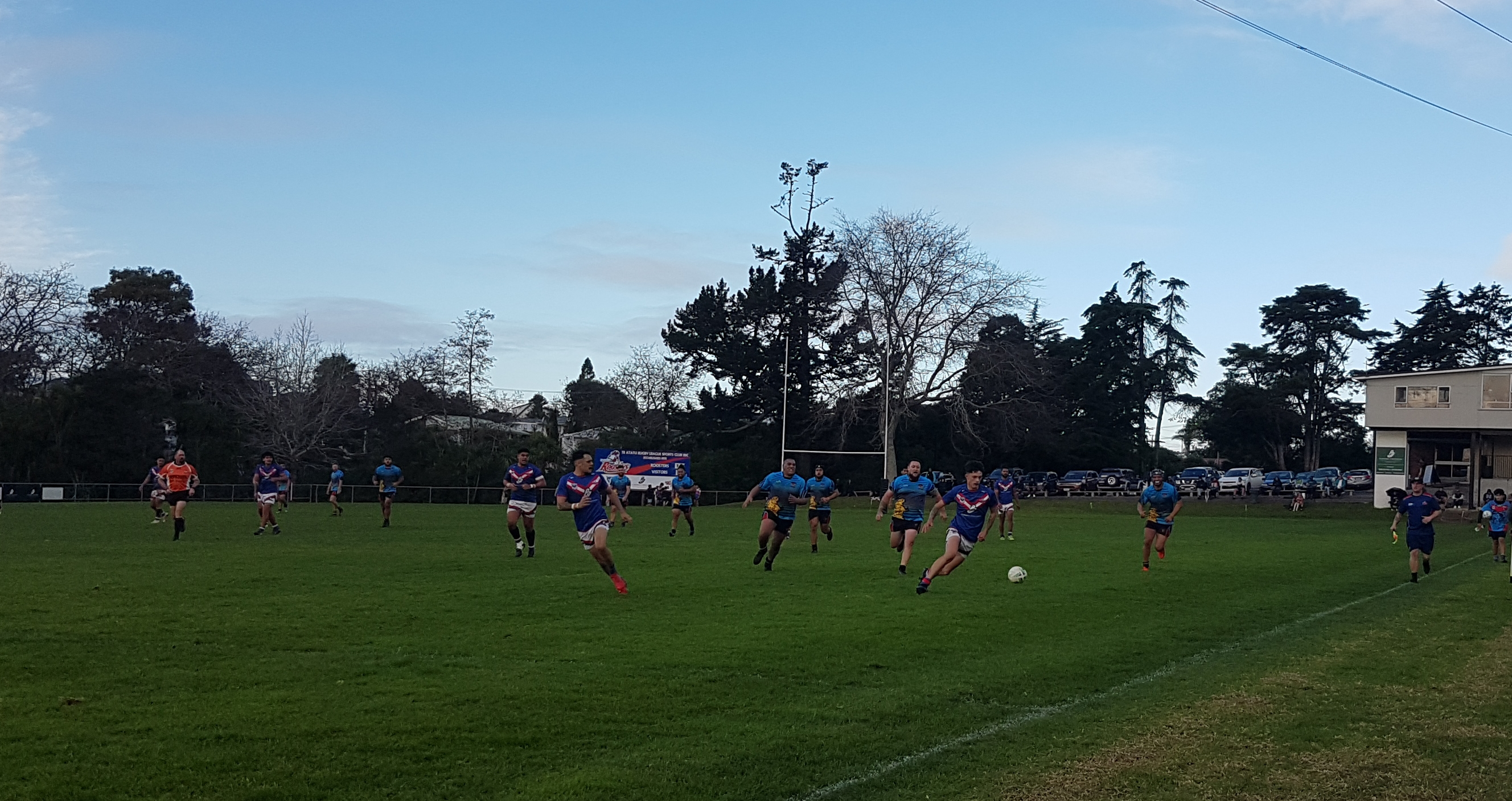
Hikoirangi Paki fielding a kick with Delaney Chaney Puata in support in Te Atatu's match with Pakuranga

Northcote notched their second win of the season when they beat Otara 36–28 to keep their slim playoff hopes alive. Martin Watson converted 5 of their 6 tries and kicked a penalty. Manukau secured a rare win over Mt Albert at Fowld's Park 18–12. A 63rd-minute penalty to Samuel Nati put them in front by 2, before Koronato John scored in the 73rd minute to give them a 6-point lead which they hung on to. Richmond and Marist met at Grey Lynn Park for the Eddie Poching Memorial Cup with Richmond running out comfortable 26–8 winners. Bay Roskill sealed a playoff spot with a 40–14 win over Manurewa. Josh Tanielu converted 6 of their 7 tries. Otahuhu racked up 104 points in their win over the struggling Papakura side while Te Atatu also made short work of Pakuranga and won 78–8 while blooding several new first grade players.

Section 1

2 July	Hibiscus Coast	12-22	Howick	Stanmore Bay 1
2:30	Try: Ian Mills (2m), Timoti Moala Liava'a (53m), Nuku Davison (66m)		Try: Anthony Fuimaono (16m, 48m), Klayton Waikato (34m), P Tuilimu 2 (56m, 63m); Con: Klayton Waikato 1/5 (49m)	Referee: David Millar

2 July	Mt Albert	12-18	Manukau	Fowld's Park 1
2:30	Try: Sebastian Su'a (28m), Blake Wardrope (49m); Con: Eiden Ackland 2 (28m, 51m)		Try: Desmond Toofohe (15m), Riccardo Arama (56m), Koronato John (73m); Con: Samuel Nati (16m), Hayden Pokai (57m); Pen: Samuel Nati (63m)	Referee: Viggo Rasmussen

2 July	Bay Roskill	40-14	Manurewa	Blockhouse Bay Reserve 4
2:30	Try: Ben Henry, Jerome Vogel, Ariki Honetana Paea, Renouf Oge, Shaun Tempest, Jarvis Leaoseve 2 Con: Joshua Tanielu 6		Try: Sam Neifeldt 2, Rory Marshall Barton; Con: Temanu Temanu	Referee: Anthony Eliott

2 July	Northcote	36-28	Otara	Birkenhead War Memorial 4
2:30	Try: Tawhirimatea Heremaia, Hemi McCarthy, Kauri Harema 2, Taine Neho, William Eriwhata; Con: Martin Watson 5 Pen: Martin Watson		Try: Joshua Fatialofa 2, Louis Papalii, Hansell Semau, Ieti Fetalaiga; Con: Louis Papalii 4	Referee: Aaronk Kesha

Section 2

2 July	Te Atatu	78-8	Pakuranga	Jack Colvin 1
2:30	Try: Ihaka Taka-Brown, Wheriko Tawhiri 2, Naiki Paniora 2, Moses Tuivoavoa, Ezra Natoealofa, Takitau Mapaplangi, Wiremu Tareha, Rhys Wikitera-Mataio, Delaney Chaney Puata; Con: Api Pēwhairangi 9, Reece Joyce 5		Try: Stanley Vaea Hingano, Davey Schuster-Overhoff	Attendance: 200; Referee: Brent Newton

2 July	Papakura	0-104	Otahuhu	Prince Edward Park 1
2:30			Try: Antonio Adams 2 (4m, 54m), Fiohiva Siale Faingaa 3 (8m, 21m, 45m), Jacob Tialavea Leniu Paulo (16m), Sione Feao (19m), Mavae Manuika (24m), Shaun Motu-Muavae (27m), Ethan Nukanuka (30m), Connor Taurua-Purcell (41m), Atanasio Kuea (45m), Filipe Vaeafisi (48m), Jamel Hunt (50m), William Stowers (53m), Unknown (58m), Phoenix Hunt (61m), Unknown (66m); Con: William Stowers 11 (8m, 17m, 19m, 21m, 24m, 27m, 30m, 41m, 45m, 46m, 50m), Fiohiva Siale Faingaa 4 (53m, 54m, 58m, 61m)	Referee: Andrew Harris

2 July	Richmond	26-8	Marist	Grey Lynn Park 2
2:30	Try: Vito Tevaga (7m), Nicholas Halalilo (23m), Unknown (57m), Unknown (58m), Amaramo Solomona (73m); Con: Hawaiiki Annandale (8m), Unknown (57m), Unknown (74m)		Try: Sagele Palaamo (62m), Unknown (77m)	Referee: Daniel Caddy

2 July	Papatoetoe	14-58	Ponsonby (G)	Kohuora Park 1
2:30	Try: no scorers submitted		Try: no scorers submitted	Referee: Tevita Pauuvale

2 July	Mangere East	8-56	Glenora	Walter Massey Park 1
2:30	Try: Ladejo Teau, Viliami Vainga		Try: Simon Luafalealo 2 (24m, 44m), Chaz Brown 2 (36m, 62m), Solomon Vasuvulagi 2 (38m, 48m), Wyatt Rangi (41m), Israel Levi (50m), Zacharia Tippins (65m), Chase Bernard (68m), James Taumata (80m); Con: Chaz Brown (40m), Wyatt Rangi 4 (48m, 51m, 63m, 67m), Solomon Vasuvulagi (80m)	Referee: Karl Vasau

==== Round 9 ====
In the final round of matches before the playoffs there were several matches that had repercussions for the final placings of teams. In Section 1 in the live streamed match Northcote beat Manukau 18 to 4. Kevin Locke joined the Northcote side for the match after returning from France earlier in the week. They finished the season with 6 competition points and a for and against percentage of 76.58% versus Otara who had a percentage of 79.66% meaning they went through in 6th place. Otara's 10 point win over Manurewa proving crucial. Pt Chevalier visited Paparoa Park and thrashed the local side 50–20 though both teams were secure in first and second place already. Mt Albert and Bay Roskill leapfrogged Manukau into 3rd and 4th respectively courtesy of a 60–8 win over Hibiscus Coast and two points for the bye in the case of Bay Roskill.

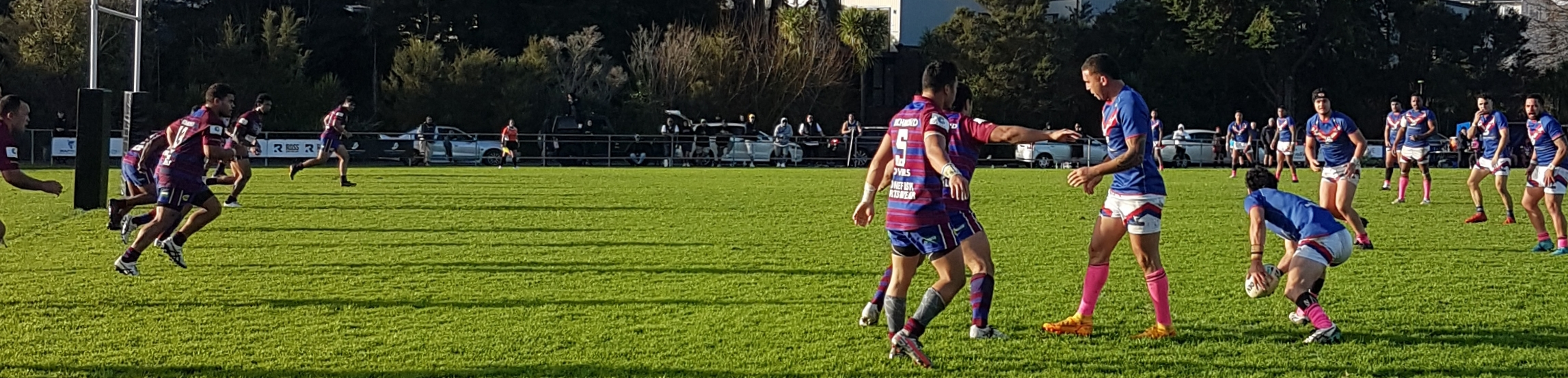
Khalan Clyde passing out of dummy half behind Roydon Gillett in Te Atatu's 26–18 win over Richmond

In Section 2 Te Atatu secured 3rd position with a gutsy 26–18 win over Richmond. Playing into a strong westerly wind blowing straight down the field Richmond played strongly and led 12–10 until a late intercept by second rower John Suli who raced 90 metres to score gave the home side a 16–12 lead at the break. Playing into the wind in the second half the Roosters were clinical, controlling possession and field position to earn a home playoff match the following week. Marist took care of Mangere East to finish 5th, tied with Richmond on 12 competitions points, just one percentage point behind Richmond (243.28% vs 242.17%). The margin was even tighter to find the final playoff team. Pakuranga beat Papakura at Ti Rakau Park 54–18 but will be wishing they had scored just one more point at some stage in the season as Mangere East's 46–12 loss to Marist meant they finished with a for and against percentage of 65.43% which shaded Pakuranga's 65.19%. With Marist's win they held on to the Roy Chan Cup.

Section 1

9 July	Howick	20-52	Pt Chevalier	Paparoa Park 1
2:30	Try: Tahi Baggaley 2 (7m, 48m), Rahs Tuivai-Lopa (77m); Con: Klayton Waikato 3/3 (8m, 48m, 78m); Pen: Klayton Waikato (40m)		Try: Patrick Sipley 2 (17m, 23m), Unknown (30m), Tevita Latu (34m), Sioeli Makaui (53m), Saula Solomona (56m), Matti Tuitama (63m), Lewis Soosemea 2 (65m, 78m), Harley Maynard (75m); Con: Francis Leger (3/4) (19m, 24m, 76m), Brody Tamarua (3/5) (54m, 57m, 64m)	Referee: Anthony Eliott

9 July	Hibiscus Coast	8-60	Mt Albert	Stanmore Bay 1
2:30	Try: no scorers submitted		Try: no scorers submitted	Referee: Brent Newton

9 July	Northcote	18-4	Manukau	Birkenhead War Memorial 4
2:30	Try: James Waterson (7m), Martin Watson (35m), Cory Haku (42m), Morgan Cook (74m); Con: Martin Watson 1/3 (37m)		Try: Kari Holamotu (48m)	Referee: Daniel Caddy

9 July	Manurewa	24-34	Otara	Mountfort Park: Jack Shelly
2:30	Try: Kikorangi Puhipi-Hibbs, Tres Von Nathan, Samuel So'oalo, Abraham Tulisi, Waru Pairama; Con: Kikorangi Puhipi-Hibbs 2		Try: Storm Tanaki, Stanley Tuipulotu, Manu Fatialofa 3, Jaycob Ru; Con: Louis Papalii 5	Referee: Leon Williamson

Section 2

9 July	Pakuranga	54-18	Papakura	Ti Rakau Park 1
2:30	Try: no scorers submitted		Try: no scorers submitted	Referee: Andrew Harris

9 July	Te Atatu	26-18	Richmond	Jack Colvin Park 1
2:30	Try: Kahil Johnson, Reece Joyce, John Suli, Joseph Price, Paorastarr Manning; Con: Api Pēwhairangi 3		Try: Jeremiah Poutu, Blade Collins-Kamuhemu, James Gavet; Con: Tuipala Faaee 3	Referee: Joseph Green

9 July	Otahuhu	136-0	Papatoetoe	Bert Henham Park 1
2:30	Try: Phoenix Hunt 3, Jacob Tialavea Leniu Paulo, Lorenzo Filimaua, William Stowers, Shaun Motu-Muavae 2, Fiohiva Siale Faingaa 2, Fangupo Fotu, Ezekial Start, Mavae Manuika 5, Sione Feao, Maddison Tekeu, Sione Tesese 2, Connor Taurua-Purcell, Antonio Adams 2 Con: Jacob Tialavea Leniu Paulo, William Stowers 4, Fiohiva Siale Faingaa 15			Referee: Nigel Williams

9 July	Marist	46-12	Mangere East	Murray Halberg Park 1
2:30	Try: Sunia Akau'loa, Sione Falala, Lene Neemia, Austin Alaia, Jonpaul White, Tulsa Saumamao, Emmanuel Cerei 3 Con: Doux Kauhiva 5		Try: Junior Moli, Robert Lauhingoa, Morgan Misifoa	Referee: Viggo Rasmussen

9 July	Ponsonby	20-68	Glenora	Victoria Park 1
2:30	Try: no scorers submitted		Try: no scorers submitted	Referee: David Millar

==== Fox Premiership preliminary finals ====
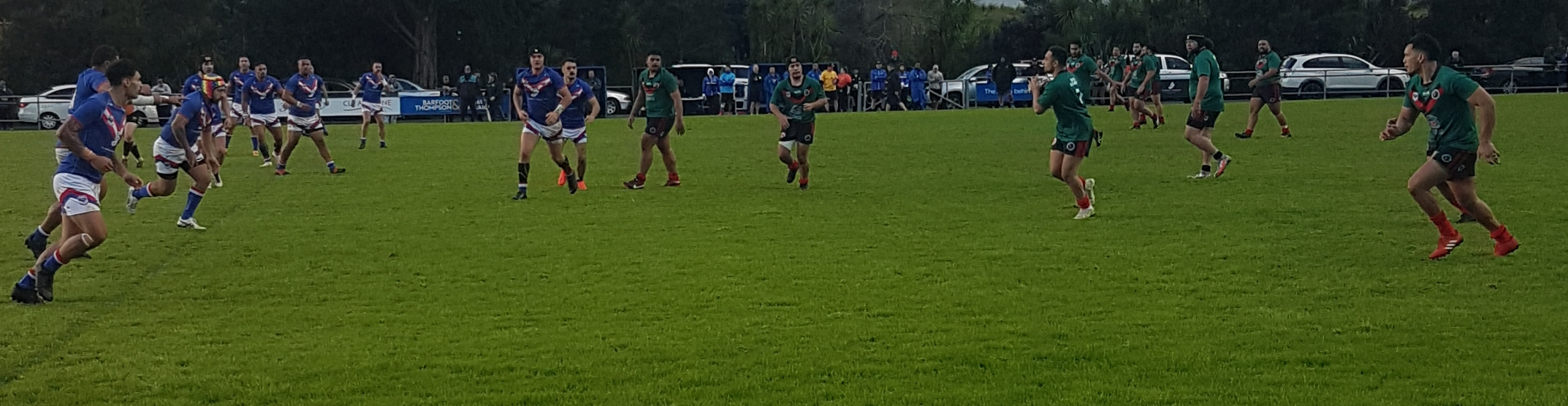
Mangere East on attack v Te Atatu in the first round of playoff matches

The first week of finals saw Pt Chevalier, Howick, Glenora, and Otahuhu have byes by virtue of finishing in the top 2 in their respective sections. The live stream match was played between Mt Albert and Otara. It was commentated by Dale Husband and Richie Barnett. Mt Albert won the match 36–18 after pushing on from an 18–10 lead with Eiden Ackland scoring 3 tries and kicking 6 conversions from 6. Sebastian Su'a who had signed on for the Newcastle Knights for 2023 scored twice. Te Atatu had a relatively easy win over Mangere East who only had 1 reserve for much of the game due to "last-minute pull-outs, illness, and a high amount of injuries" according to their social media feed. Delaney Chaney-Puata scored a second half hat trick with Cook Island international Reece Joyce converting 9 tries in Api Pēwhairangi's absence through illness. Bay Roskill held off Manukau 28–22 in the only tight match of the weekend to advance to play Howick. Marist proved far too strong for Richmond at Grey Lynn Park, winning 34–0 with Kameli Vasu scoring twice in a 6 tries to nil victory. The match was streamed by Petes Filming.

Section 1

16 July	Mt Albert	36-18	Otara	Fowlds Park 1
2:30	Try: Johnson Peters (18m), Eiden Ackland 3 (22m, 59m, 72m), Sebastian Su'a 2 (45m, 65m); Con: Eiden Ackland 6/6 (18m, 23m, 46m, 60m, 66m, 72m)		Try: Stanley Tuipolotu (28m), Josiah Aspden (45m), Joshua Perez (74m, 78m); Con: Louis Papalii 1/4 (46m)	Attendance: 400; Referee: Joseph Green, Poriau Uamaki (TJ), Corey Jull (TJ)

16 July	Bay Roskill	28-22	Manukau	Blockhouse Bay Reserve 3
2:30	Try: Unknown, Joshua Tanielu, Mackenzie Kata, Ariki Honetana-Paea, Jarvis Leaoseve; Con: Joshua Tanielu 4		Try: Raven Togiafofoa, Koronato John, Hayden Pokai, Petuiko (Patrick) Hufanga; Con: Samuel Nati 2, Hayden Pokai	Referee: Viggo Rasmussen, Simon Bailey (TJ), Rebecca Ellison (TJ)

Section 2

16 July	Te Atatu	62-6	Mangere East	Jack Colvin Park
2:30	Try: Charvez Watts Ikitule 2 (2m, 14m), Reece Joyce (11m), Douglas Veatupu (31m), Roydon Gillett (35m), Paterika Vaivai (37m), Cortez Taulu (40m), Devante Mihinui (58m), Delaney Chaney 3 (60m, 71m, 80m); Con: Reece Joyce 9 (12m, 16m, 32m, 36m, 38m, 59m, 61m, 72m, 80m)		Try: Ezra Lemusu (49m); Con: Vinnie Chan (51m)	Attendance: 200; Referee: David Millar, Paul Lorigan (TJ)

16 July	Richmond	34-0	Marist	Grey Lynn Park 2
2:30	Try: Nicholas Halalilo (10m), Kameli Vasu 2 (14m, 80m), Jeremiah Poutu (40m), Vito Tevaga (58m), Amaramo Solomona (66m); Con: Tevin Arona 4/6 (15m, 40m, 59m, 68m), Pen: Tevin Arona 1/1 (23m)			Referee: Daniel Caddy, Grant Smith (TJ), Ryan Doherty (TJ)

==== Fox Premiership quarter finals ====
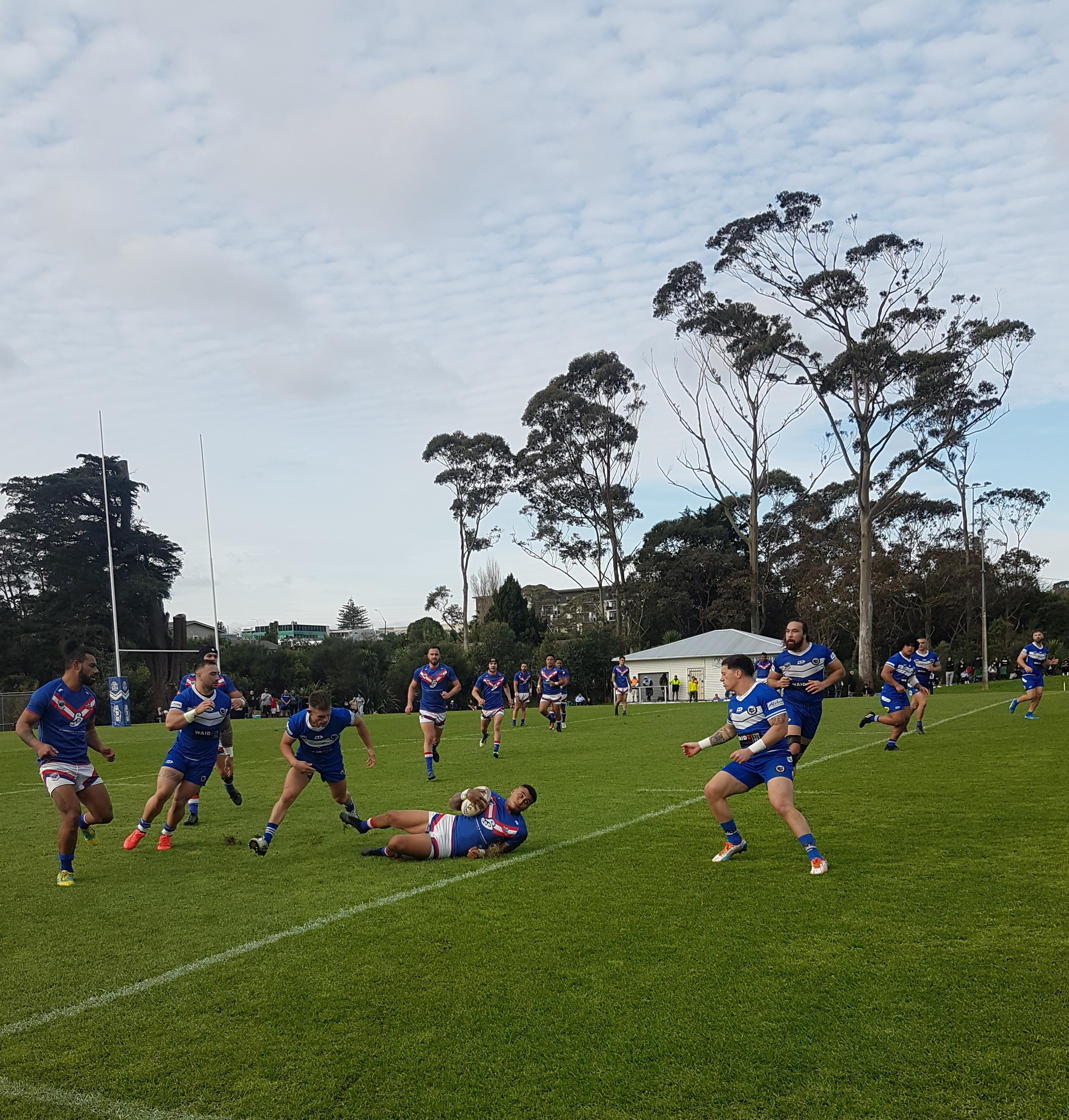
John Suli brought to ground by Phil Kingi in the Glenora-Te Atatu match at Harold Moody Field

All four home teams who came into their matches off a weeks rest won, with most margins being reasonably comfortable. The one exception was the Otahuhu win over Richmond by 20 points to 12. The score was 14–12 at halftime before a late try to Phoenix Hunt sealed the win. In the live streamed game Glenora jumped out to an early 12–0 lead, scoring 2 tries off the back of kicks. Akarana Falcons U20 full back Esom Ioka climbed to take a bomb and sprinted over and then Mosese Faeamani dived on a loose ball in the in goal to score a second. Another try to James Taumata threatened to end the game as a contest but a try to Te Atatu's Royden Gillett and conversion by Api Pēwhairangi made the half time score 16–6. The second half was relatively even but Glenora pushed on for a 26–12 win. Mt Albert made a spirited showing at Walker Park and the score was locked up at 18–18 at half time. Tevita Latu scored the go ahead try early in the second half and then Pt Chevalier came home strongly to win 40–22. Howick made fairly easy work of Bay Roskill, winning 44 points to 6 at Paparoa Park. The match was live streamed by Petes Filming.

Section 1

23 July	Pt Chevalier	40-22	Mt Albert	Walker Park 1
2:30	Try: Brody Tamarua 2 (3m, 65m), Dylan Tavita (11m), Patrick Sipley (15m), Tevita Latu (45m), Ollie Tuimavave 2 (49m, 52m); Con: Francis Leger 6 (4m, 13m, 16m, 47m, 51m, 66m)		Try: Unknown 4 (7m, 23m, 30m, 74m); Con: Unknown 3 (9m, 24m, 31m)	Referee: Joseph Green, David Millar (TJ), & Ryan Doherty (TJ)

23 July	Howick	44-6	Bay Roskill	Paparoa Park 1
2:30	Try: Uila Aiolupo (18m), Rueben Tolovae (29m), Alan Niulevu 2 (34m, 45m), Trent Bishop (43m), Tayhler Paora (61m), Jerome Mika (75m), Eliaz Marsters (79m); Con: Klayton Waikato 6/8 (19m, 30m, 44m, 46m, 62m, 80m)		Try: Joshua Tanielu (53m); Con: Joshua Tanielu 0/1; Pen: Joshua Tanielu (40m)	Referee: Rochelle Tamarua, Rebecca Ellison (TJ), & Poriau Uamaki (TJ)

Section 2

23 July	Glenora	26-12	Te Atatu	Harold Moody 1
2:30	Try: Esom Ioka (1m), Mosese Faeamani (11m), James Taumata 2 (14m, 51m), Kadiyae Ioka (62m); Con: Mose Esera 3 (2m, 13m, 63m)		Try: Royden Gillett (35m), Devante Mihinui (57m); Con: Api Pēwhairangi 2 (37m, 58m)	Attendance: 400; Referee: Viggo Rasmussen, Keven Ah-Ken (TJ), Corey Jull (TJ)

23 July	Otahuhu	20-12	Richmond	Bert Henham Park 1
2:30	Try: Sione Tesese (11m), Connor Taurua-Purcell (20m), Antonio Adams (30m), Phoenix Hunt (80m); Con: Fiohiva Siale Faingaa (12m), Lorenzo Filimaua (80m)		Try: Amaramo Solomona (6m), Netane Vi (26m); Con: Unknown (7m, 27m)	Referee: Anthony Aliott, Daniel Caddy (TJ), & Nigel Williams (TJ)

==== Fox Premiership semifinals ====
Section 1

30 July	Pt Chevalier	24-12	Howick	Mt Smart Stadium 2
2:30	Try: Francis Leger (2m), Daniel Harris-Tavita (11m), Tevita Latu (46m), Ollie Tuimavave (48m), Siapo Pasene (60m); Con: Francis Leger 2/4 (12m, 47m), Brody Tamarua 0/1		Try: Uila Aiolupo (40m), Tayhler Paora (75m); Con: Klayton Waikato 2/2 (40m, 76m)	Attendance: 400; Referee: Daniel Caddy, Anthony Eliott (TJ), Corey Jull (TJ)

Section 2

30 July	Glenora	26-18	Otahuhu	Mt Smart Stadium 2
12:45	Try: Solomon Vasuvuvulagi (2m), Esom Ioka (25m), Simon Luafalealo 2 (44m, 65m), Daniel Reuelu-Buchanan (48m), Chase Bernard (75m); Con: Mose Esera 1/4 (3m), Chaz Brown 1/2 (76m)		Try: Mavae Manuila (9m), Sione Tesese (53m), Benjamin Wharton-Benedict (77m); Con: Lorenzo Filimaua 2/3 (54m, 78m)	Attendance: 500; Referee: Viggo Rasmussen, Rochelle Tamarua (TJ), Corey Jull (TJ)

==== Fox Memorial Premiership grand final ====
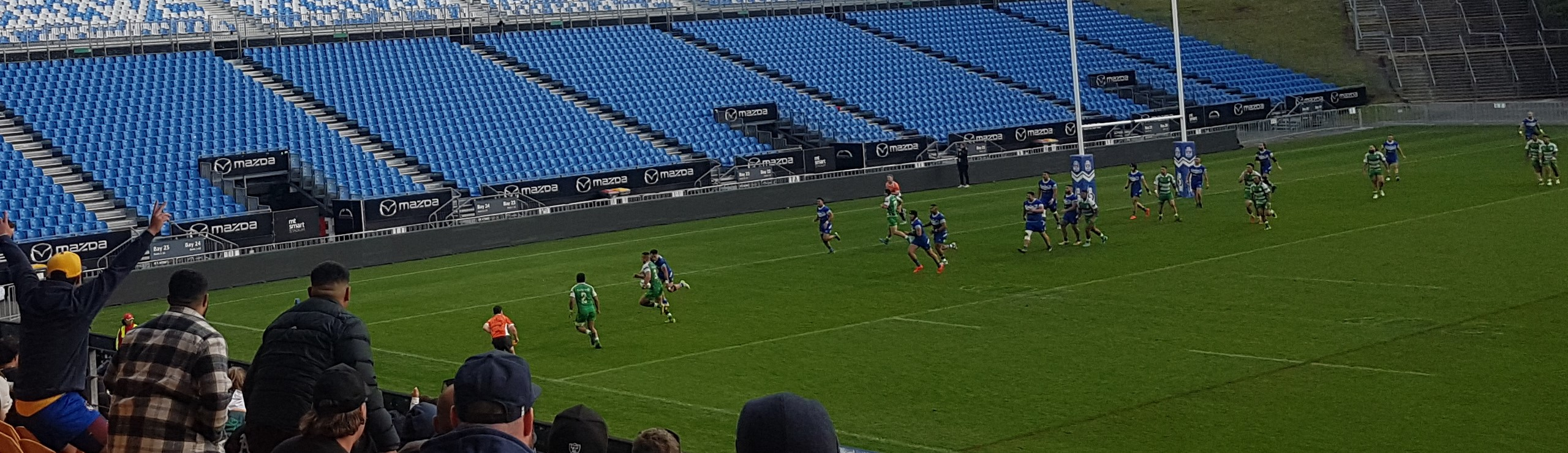
Matthew Whyte scoring to give Point Chevalier a 14–6 lead

Soape Kavaliku and Daniel Reuelu-Buchanan were both making their 100th appearance for the Glenora Bears. Point Chevalier Pirates won a closely fought Fox Memorial final 14–12 over the Glenora after taking a 10–6 lead into halftime. They scored a brilliant try after Pt Chevalier junior, Ollie Tuimavave (who brought up 50 games for the Pirates during the year) returned a kick over 50 metres before a centering grubber kick was gathered by Harley Maynard, who crashed over under the posts in the tackle of Kadiyae Ioka. They stretched their lead 3 minutes later with a try to captain Francis Leger who stepped infield and dived across.

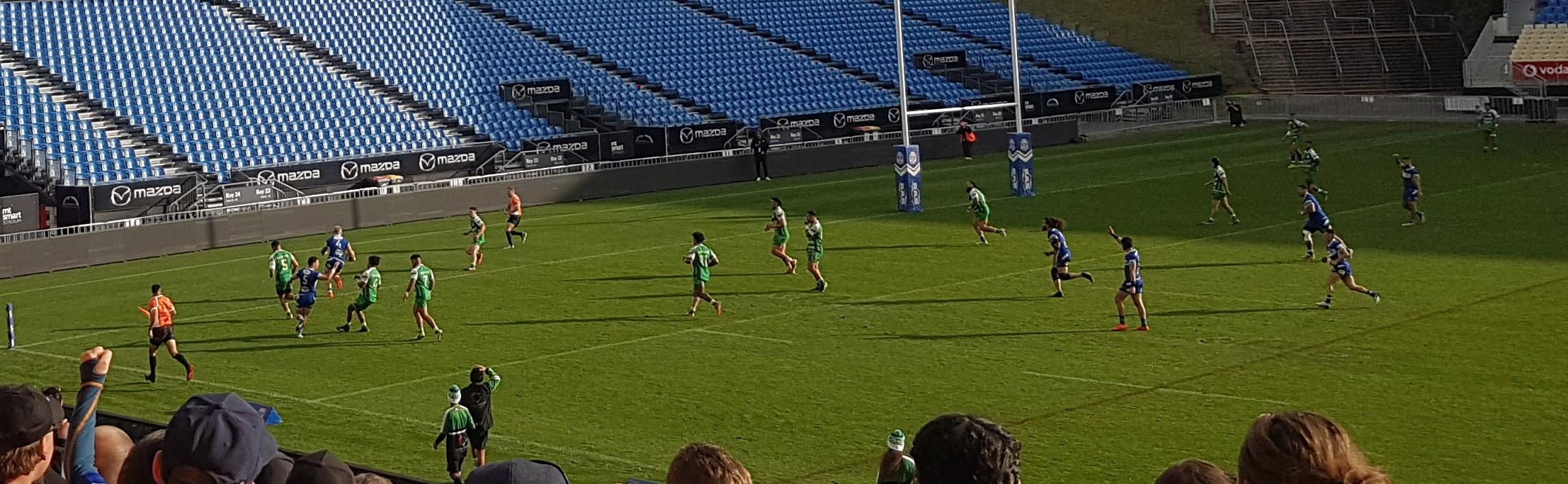
Chaz Brown crossing for Glenora to narrow the score to 10–4

Glenora narrowed the gap late in the first half with Chaz Brown beating Leger on the outside to cross, with Mose Esera converting. Point Chevalier pushed their lead back out to 8 early n the second half with a try in the left corner to Matthew Whyte. With 30 minutes remaining Glenora scored a converted try to Fatani Paea Manukia after a superb offload from former NZ Police rugby league representative, Chase Bernard. The conversion made the margin just 2 points. Despite coming close several times neither team could add further points and Pt Chevalier held out for the win. Brody Tamarua of Point Chevalier was awarded the Doug Price Memorial Medal for man of the match. The match was live streamed on YouTube and also broadcast live on Sky Sport with Glen Larmer and Wade Brunsdon commentating.

6 August	Pt Chevalier	14-12	Glenora	Mt Smart Stadium 1
3:10	Try: Harley Maynard (20m), Francis Leger (23m), Matthew Whyte (45m); Con: Francis Leger 1/3 (21m)		Try: Chaz Brown (34m), Fatani Paea Manukia (50m); Con: Mose Esera 2/2 (35m, 51m)	Referee: Anthony Eliott, Viggo Rasmussen (TJ), Corey Jull (TJ)

=== Fox Championship (Sharman Cup) ===
The Fox Championship was played between the teams which finished in the bottom 3 of Section 1 and bottom 4 of Section 2.

==== Fox Championship preliminary finals ====
Section 1

17 July	Northcote	28-18	Manurewa	Birkenhead War Memorial 4
2:30	Try: Morgan Cook, James Waterson, Martin Watson, Taylor Daniels, Kevin Locke 2 Con: Martin Watson 2		Try: Kikorangi Puhipi-Hibbs, Sam Neufeldt, Tane Wiki, Petelo Havili; Con: Henry Dunn	Referee: Aaronk Kesha

Section 2

15 July	Papakura	6-18	Papatoetoe	Prince Edward Park 1
7:30	Try: Jason Tou; Con: Ari Busby		Try: Greig Greig, Jayson Iosefa, Masitati Tuifua; Con: Jordyn Mahika 2 Pen: Jordyn Mahika	Referee: Nigel Williams

16 July	Pakuranga	46-14	Ponsonby (G)	Ti Rakau Park 1
2:30	Try: Tevita Faiva (3m), Manu Tukia (20m), Samuel Fonua 2 (22m, 76m), Molisoni Faiva 3 (23m, 48m, 79m), Ofa Pulu (40m), Unknown (43m); Con: Molisoni Faiva 5 (4m, 21m, 41m, 49m, 79m),		Try: Heitony Talagi 2 (14m, 72m), Timor Reese Williams (53m); Con: Taani Fangupo (16m)	Referee: Andrew Harris

==== Fox Championship quarter finals ====
Section 1

23 July	Manurewa	10-34	Hibiscus Coast	Mountford Park: Jack Shelly
2:30	Try: Hauriri Harvey (22m), Sam Neufeldt (64m); Con: Nathan Simmons (23m)		Try: Isaac Jones (25m), Samuel Waterworth (29m), Liam Ackland 2 (39m, 70m), Kavana Te Kiri-Ryan 2 (49m, 73m); Con: Devon Tronel-Harris 5 (26m, 31m, 40m, 50m, 80m)	Referee: Aaronk Kesha

Section 2

23 July	Ponsonby (G)	60-16	Papatoetoe	Victoria Park 1
2:30	Try: Taani Fangupo 3, Timor Reese Williams 2, Levi Helleur-Atiga 3, Mike Williams, Liam Briggs, Sasha Urale; Con: Taani Fangupo 7, Liam Briggs		Try: Greg Smith 2, Liki Iloheafaiva; Con: Jordyn Mahika 2	Referee: Brent Newton

==== Fox Championship semi finals ====
Northcote made easy work of Ponsonby at the Birkenhead War Memorial, romping away to a 48–4 win. James Waterson scored a hat trick for the home side, and Martin Watson converted 6 of their 9 tries. The match was streamed by Petes Filming. Pakuranga had to come back twice after trailing 12–0 after 15 minutes, and 18–12 after 50 minutes. Three unconverted tries to Manu Tukia, Ofa Pulu, and Samuel Fonua edged them home at Ti Rakau Park in Pakuranga.

Section 1

30 July	Northcote	48-4	Ponsonby (G)	Birkenhead War Memorial 4
2:30	Try: James Waterson 3 (7m, 21m, 56m), Alvin Tu'ione 2 (14m, 65m), Robert Taupau (27m), Kevin Locke (29m), Martin Watson (69m), Tawhirimatea Heremaia (74m); Con: Martin Watson 6 (15m, 23m, 28m, 30m, 70m, 75m)		Try: Timor Reese Williams (24m)	Referee: Brent Newton

Section 2

30 July	Pakuranga	24-18	Hibiscus Coast	Ti Rakau Park 1
2:30	Try: Sione Tuimoala (26m), David Schaumkel Otukolo (43m), Manu Tukia (53m), Ofa Pulu (60m), Samuel Fonua (80m); Con: Molisoni Faiva (27m, 43m)		Try: Isaac Jones (5m), Nukutawhiti Davison (15m), Boston Josephs (49m); Con: Devon Tronel-Harris (6m, 15m, 50m)	Referee: Joseph Green

==== Fox Championship (Sharman Cup) grand final ====
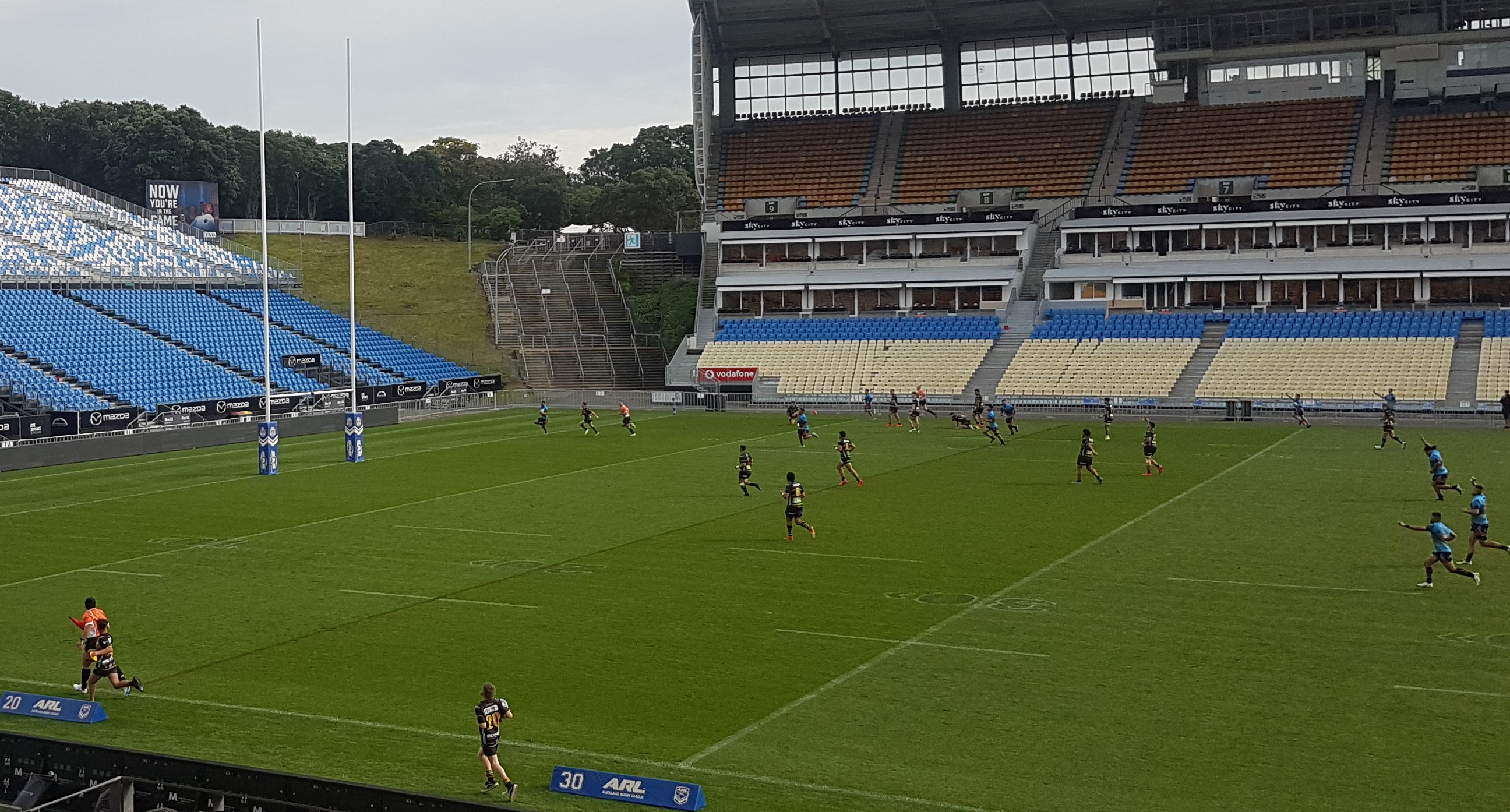
Manu Tukia scoring for Pakuranga in the 70th minute

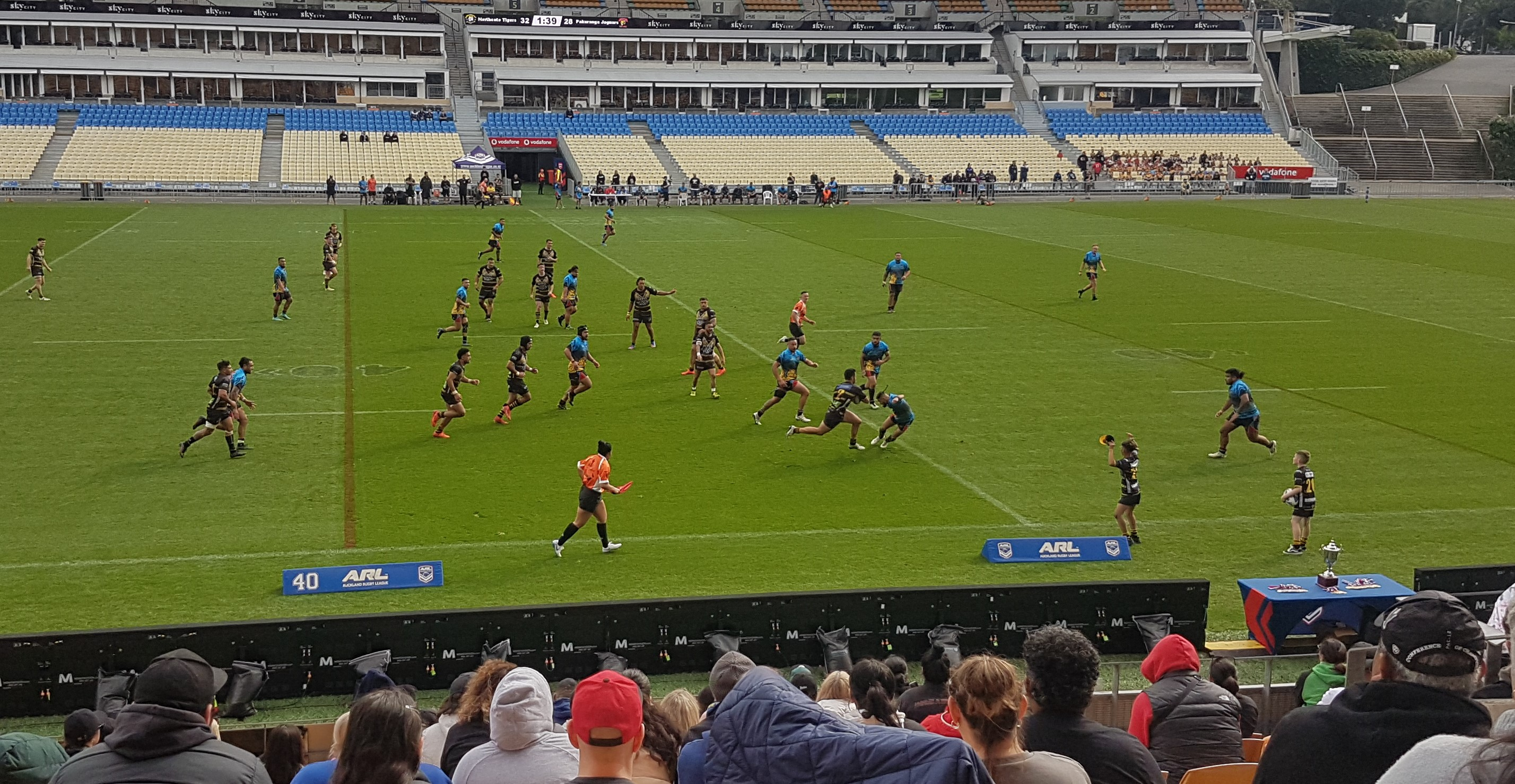
Martin Watson on attack for Northcote

The Northcote Tigers won the Sharman Cup by defeating the Pakuranga Jaguars in a thrilling match 32–28. They threatened to run away with the game when Huston Holloway scored his second try which was converted in the 61st minute to make the score 32–16. However two late tries to Pakuranga through Ofa Pulu in the 67th minute and Manu Tukia in the 70th minute narrowed the margin to just 4 points with 9 minutes remaining. Northcote held on however for the win. The match was live streamed on YouTube.

6 August	Northcote	32-28	Pakuranga	Mt Smart Stadium 1
12:45	Try: Martin Watson (3m), Taine Neho (15m), Huston Holloway 2 (21m, 61m), Neihana Walters (54m), Hsed Faaee (57m); Con: Martin Watson 4/6 (4m, 16m, 55m, 62m)		Try: Tihau Nabala (7m), Molisoni Faiva (27m), Sione Tuimoala (46m), Ofa Pulu (67m), Manu Tukia (70m); Con: Molisoni Faiva 4/5 (8m, 47m, 68m, 70m)	Referee: Joseph Green, Brent Newton (TJ), Aaronk Kesha (TJ)

== Women's Competitions ==
=== Farrelly Photos Women's Premiership ===
==== Standings ====
Team	Pld	W	D	L	F	A	%	Pts
Pt Chevalier Green	12	11	0	1	492	110	447.27%	22
Manurewa Wahine Kowhai	12	8	1	3	380	194	195.88%	17
Otara Scorpions Stingers	12	6	1	5	230	222	103.6%	13
Ponsonby Women	12	6	0	6	328	270	121.48%	12
Richmond Roses	12	6	0	6	230	258	89.15%	12
Howick Hornets Women	12	6	0	6	274	344	79.65%	12
Taniwharau Women	12	4	0	8	202	330	61.21%	8
Otahuhu Leopards Women	12	0	0	12	120	528	22.73%	0

==== Round 1 ====
Last years semi-finalists met again to open the season with Pt Chevalier winning 26–14 in Grey Lynn. Katelyn Vaha'akolo scored a run away try late in the match to seal the victory for the defending champions. For Richmond Waiana Jones scored twice. Ponsonby opened with a 34–16 win at Paparoa Park controlling the game with 7 tries, each to different players, 3 of which were converted by Mele Hufanga. Otahuhu, who were back with a new side went down to the Waikato side, Taniwharau 44–6. Ilaisaane Taufa scored Otahuhu's only points with a try and conversion. Nadia Flavell bagged 4 tries for Taniwharau, while Calista Ruruku kicked 2 conversions. Manurewa Kowhai and Otara fought out a 20–20 draw at Mountfort Park in Manurewa.

8 May	Richmond Roses	14–26	Pt Chevalier Green	Grey Lynn Park 2
2:30	Try: Waiana Jones 2, Rowena Meleisea; Con: Laishon Jones		Try: Madison Bartlett, Sharnyze Pihema, Katelyn Vaha'akolo, Sylvia Brunt 2 Con: Tatiana Finau 3	Referee: David Millar

8 May	Howick Hornets Women	16–34	Ponsonby Women	Paparoa Park 1
1:00	Try: Elisapeta Gale, Jonsal Tautari, Cilia-Marie Po’e-Tofaeono; Con: Zayde Sarah-Baldwin 2		Try: Pearl Tuitama, Mele Toki, Mele Maatuleio Fotu-Moala, Tessa Wright, Tanika-Jazz Noble-Bell, Natalee Tagavaitau, Mele Hufanga; Con: Mele Hufanga 3	Referee: Nigel Williams

8 May	Otahuhu Leopards Women	6–44	Taniwharau Women	Bert Henham Park 1
2:30	Try: Ilaisaane Taufa; Con: Ilaisaane Taufa		Try: Leah-Rhys Toka, Te Oriwa Ahuriri 2, Lakeisha Tipene, Nadia Flavell 4, Naomi Kara; Con: Calista Ruruku 3, Lakeisha Tipene	Referee: Aaronk Kesha

8 May	Manurewa Wahine Kowhai	20-20	Otara Scorpion Stingers	Mountfort Park, Jack Shelly
2:30	Try: Mackenzie Wiki 2 + others unknown Con: unknown		Try: unknown Con: unknown	Referee: Tevita Pauuvale

==== Round 2 ====
Ponsonby recorded their first win (26-16) over Manurewa since they joined the premier women's competition in 2018. They had 5 separate try scorers with Mele Hufanga complimenting her try with 3 conversions, while Danielle Apaina was the player of the day. Mackenzie Wiki scored twice for the losers. Pt Chevalier made short work of Howick at Walker Park winning 52–4 with Lavinia Tauhalaliku scoring 4 tries. Kylie Porter scored the only points for Howick. Richmond Roses beat Taniwharau 34–10 at Opaheke Sports Park with Laishon Jones scoring once and converting 3 of their 7 tries. Otara recorded their first win on the season beating Otahuhu 20–6 at Ngati Otara Park. Wati Deleilomaloma scored twice in their win with Aketule McKinley-Sadaraka converting 2 tries.

15 May	Ponsonby Women	26-16	Manurewa Wahine Kowhai	Victoria Park 1
12:45	Try: Pearl Tuitama, Milania Cairns, Mele Maatuleio Fotue-Moala, Tessa Wright, Mele Hufanga; Con: Mele Hufanga 3		Try: Alexis Hapuku, Pahu Hepana, Mackenzie Wiki 2

15 May	Taniwharau Women	10-34	Richmond Roses	Opaheke Sports Park 1
2:30	Try: Leah Rhys Toka (40m), Te Oriwa Ahuriri (71m); Con: Calista Ruruka (74m)		Try: Claudia Hanham (6m), Kaiyah Atai (19m), Laishon Jones (27m), Rowena Meleisea 2 (36m, 64m), Waiana Jones (49m), Charlize Tumu-Makara (59m); Con: Laishon Jones 3 (28m, 60m, 66m)	Referee: Michael Analu

15 May	Pt Chevalier Green	52-4	Howick Hornets Women	Walker Park 1
2:30	Try: Lavinia Tauhalaliku 4 (7m, 10m, 50m, 72m), Debnorah Moors (17m), Apii Nichols 2 (25m, 52m), Sylvia Brunt 2 (38m, 40m), Lanulangi Veainu (60m), Katelyn Vaha'akolo (77m); Con: Sylvia Brunt 4 (27m, 39m, 40m, 64m)		Try: Kylie Porter	Referee: Nigel Williams

15 May	Otara Scorpion Stingers	20-6	Otahuhu Leopards Women	Ngati Otara Park 1
	Try: Mary Solovi, Justyce Roebech, Wati Deleilomaloma 2 Con: Aketuke McKinley-Sadaraka 2		Try: Onjeurlina Leiataua; Con: Ilaisaane Taufa	Referee: Tevita Pauuvale

==== Round 3 ====
Richmond held their club day with the Richmond Roses playing curtain raiser to the premier men's match at Grey Lynn Park. Richmond won a thriller with Laishon Jones scoring twice and kicking 3 conversions. Rowena Meleisea also scored twice for Richmond, while Mele Hufanga converted 4 of Ponsonby's 5 tries. Howick had 7 separate try scorers in their 32–26 win over Taniwharau, with Zayde Sarah-Baldwin converting 3 of them. Charlette Butler and Trinity Crosby each scored twice for Taniwharau with Calista Ruruku scoring once and kicking 3 conversions.

21 May	Richmond Roses	30–28	Ponsonby Women	Grey Lynn Park 2
12:45	Try: Kaiyah Atai, Laishon Jones 2, Rowena Meleisea 2, Abigail Roache; Con: Laishon Jones 3		Try: Phoenix Pivac, Pearl Tuitama, Milania Cairns, Mele Hufanga, Mele Maatuleio Fotu-Moala; Con: Mele Hufanga 4	Referee: Hayden Price

22 May	Manurewa Wahine Kowhai	46–10	Otahuhu Leopards Women	Mountfort Park, Jack Shelly
2:30	Try: Amiria Te Iringa 4 (4m, 8m, 30m, 60m), Jodeci Joseph 2 (12m, 38m), Amber Kani (18m), Mackenzie Wiki (21m), Alexis Hapuku (35m); Con: Kerehitina Denise 5 (13m, 19m, 23m, 39m, 62m)		Try: Charlie-Kaige Kamuhemu (47m), Sade Scheumkel (72m); Con: Ilaisaana Taufu (48m)	Referee: Nigel Williams

22 May	Pt Chevalier Green	40-10	Otara Scorpion Stingers	Walker Park 1
2:30				Referee: David Millar

22 May	Howick Hornets Women	32–26	Taniwharau Women	Paparoa Park 1
1:00	Try: Lisa Edwards Rua (29m), Jazmin Walker (36m), Wendy Savieti (42m), Melvina Weilert 2 (45m, 61m), Sharelle Leota (52m), Mollie Tagaloa (55m); Con: Zayde Sarah-Baldwin 2 (38m, 53m)		Try: Charlette Butler 2 (5m, 42m), Trinity Crosby 2 (25m, 71m), Calista Ruruku (80m); Con: Calista Ruruku 3 (6m, 26m, 43m)	Referee: Tevita Pauuvale

==== Round 4 ====
Otara secured their second win with a 20–8 win away to Taniwharau, with Wati Delailomaloma scoring another double. Shannon Leota scored twice in Richmond's 18–10 win over Howick. Ponsonby thrashed Otahuhu 60–8 at Bert Henham Park with Mele Hufanga scoring 4 tries and her namesake Mele Maatuleio Fotu-Moala scoring 3. Hufanga also kicked 4 conversions for a personal haul of 24 points.

29 May	Taniwharau Women	8-20	Otara Scorpion Stingers	Opaheke Sports Park 1
2:30	Try: Charlette Butler (14m), Tia Toka (31m)		Try: Josephine Marearai (6m), Wati Delailomaloma 2 (22m, 76m), Annessa Biddle (66m); Con: Aketuke McKinley-Sadaraka 2 (8m, 68m)	Referee: Bryan Barron

29 May	Richmond Roses	18-10	Howick Hornets Women	Grey Lynn Park 1
2:30	Try: Abigail Roache (19m), Anahera Mohi (57m), Shannon Leota 2 (66m, 81m); Con: Juliana Newman (66m)		Try: Melvina Weilert (27m), Shontelle Woodman (32m); Con: Zayde Sarah-Baldwin (33m)	Referee: David Millar

29 May	Otahuhu Leopards Women	8-60	Ponsonby Women	Bert Henham Park 1
2:30	Try: Vaine Tinirau Schwenke, Onjeurlina Leiataua		Try: Alaimoana Fineaso-Levi, Jennifer Reu 2, Mele Maatuleio Fotu-Moala 3, Mele Hufanga 4, Christina Andres 2, Sarah Filimoeatu; Con: Mele Hufanga 4	Referee: Nigel Williams

29 May	Pt Chevalier Green	30-14	Manurewa Wahine Kowhai	Walker Park 1
2:30	Try: Lilieta Maumau (12m), Tatiana Finau (13m), Unknown (36m), Jaime Patuki (48m), Katelyn Vaha'akolo 2 (53m, 80m); Con: Tatiana Finau 3 (13m, 37m, 55m)		Try: Halayna Finau 2 (61m, 74m), Karley Te Kawa (69m); Con: Kerehitinia Denise (63m)

==== Round 5 ====
11 June	Richmond Roses	12-22	Manurewa Wahine Kowhai	Grey Lynn Park 1
12:45				Referee: Bryan Barron

12 June	Howick Hornets Women	40-36	Otahuhu Leopards Women	Paparoa Park 1
1:00	Try: Zayde Sarah-Baldwin 3, Melvina Weilert 2, Lisa Edwards Rua 2, Mollie Tagaloa; Con: Zayde Sarah-Baldwin 2, Mollie Tagaloa 2		Try: Sueana Tiriaera Kumar, Tafao Faaeaina Asaua 2, Ramouner Henry, Onjeurlina Leiataua, Sefuluai Tamotu; Con: Ilaisaane Taufu 6	Referee: Nigel Williams

12 June	Ponsonby Women	18-10	Otara Scorpion Stingers	Victoria Park 1
2:30	Try: Milania Cairns, Sarah Filimoeatu, Mele Toki, Metanoia Fotumoala; Con: Jhana Magele		Try: Unknown, Annessa Biddle; Con: Aketuke McKinley	Referee: David Millar

12 June	Taniwharau Women	22-66	Pt Chevalier Green	Ray Small Park 1
2:30	Try: Nadia Flavell (19m), Te Oriwa Ahuriri 2 (33m, 51m), Lakeisha Tipene (63m); Con: Lakeisha Tipene 2 (20m, 34m), Naomi Kara (52m)		Try: Laishon Albert Jones 3 (5m, 11m, 77m), Lavinia Tauhalaliku 3 (8m, 45m, 60m), Charlotte Arnopp-Scanlan 2 (14m, 68m), Katelyn Vaha'akolo (24m), Lanulangi Veainu 3 (29m, 56m, 72m), Annetta-Claudia Nuuausala (73m); Con: Tatiana Finau 7 (6m, 12m, 30m, 46m, 57m, 69m, 75m)	Referee: Michael Analu

==== Round 6 ====
19 June	Taniwharau Women	26–22	Ponsonby Women	Te Papatakaaro Park 1
1:00	Try: Te Oriwa Ahuriri (25m, 51m), Sarah Hekeiterangi Broadhurst (38m), Chyann Kaitapu (58m), Nadia Flavell (80m); Con: Calista Ruruku (40m), Naomi Kara (52m), Lakeisha Tipene (59m)		Try: Tessa Wright (1m), Moanekah Vaai (40m), Metanoia Fotumoala (41m), Milania Cairns (41m), Sarah Filimoeatu (41m); Con: Jhana Magele (1m)

19 June	Otahuhu Leopards Women	0–96	Pt Chevalier Green	Bert Henham Park 1
2:30	Try: no scorers submitted		Try: no scorers submitted	Referee: Nigel Williams

19 June	Otara Scorpion Stingers	24–8	Richmond Roses	Ngati Otara Park 1
2:30	Try: no scorers submitted		Try: no scorers submitted	Referee: Aaronk Kesha

19 June	Howick Hornets Women	10–48	Manurewa Wahine Kowhai	Paparoa Park 1
2:30	Try: Unknown, Jonsal Tautari; Con: Zayde Sarah-Baldwin		Try: Makayla Eli, Carnetra Nathan, Halayna Finau, Kaylen Ikitule, Kerehitinia Denise, Harano Te Iringa 2, Ngatokotoru Arakua 2 Con: Makayla Eli 2, Kerehitinia Denise 4	Referee: David Millar

==== Round 7 ====
26 June	Richmond Roses	WBD - LBD	Otahuhu Leopards Women	Bert Henham Park 1
2:30

26 June	Ponsonby Women	4–32	Pt Chevalier Green	Victoria Park 1
2:30	Try: Chloe Tearikimana		Try: Lavinia Tauhalaliku 3, Apii Nicholls-Pualau, Katelyn Vaha'akolo, Queenie Uiese; Con: Apii Nicholls 3	Referee: David Millar

26 June	Manurewa Wahine Kowhai	52–16	Taniwharau Women
2:30	Try: no scorers submitted		Try: no scorers submitted

26 June	Howick Hornets Women	14–36	Otara Scorpion Stingers	Paparoa Park 1
2:30	Try: Zayde Sarah-Baldwin, Lovianna Fanene, Shanita Woodman; Con: Zayde Sarah-Baldwin		Try: Corina Vai, Josephine Marearai, Marina Hagai, Wati Delailomaloma 2, Annessa Biddle 2 Con: Aketuke McKinley-Sadaraka 4

==== Round 8 ====
1 July	Howick Hornets Women	50–34	Ponsonby Women	Paparoa Park 1
7:00	Try: Cilia-Marie Po'e-Tofaeono 6 (6m, 40m, 46m, 51m, 59m, 76m), Saphire Abraham (17m), Melivina Weilert (20m), Mollie Tagaloa (40m), Gedaliah Pulupaki (71m); Con: Zayde Sarah-Baldwin 5 (21m, 40m, 42m, 46m, 73m)		Try: Mele Hufanga 3 (3m, 28m, 60m), Chloe Tearikimana (10m), Sarah Filimoeatu (38m), Mazelina Haurua (67m), Jhana Magele (80m); Con: Jhana Magele 2 (30m, 65m), Mele Hufanga (81m)	Referee: James Priest

3 July	Pt Chevalier Green	26–4	Richmond Roses	Walker Park 1
2:30	Try: no scorers submitted		Try: no scorers submitted	Referee: Warren Clarke

3 July	Taniwharau Women	34–6	Otahuhu Leopards Women	Ray Small Park 1
2:30	Try: Te Oriwa Ahuriri 2 (1m, 63m), Nyesha Hamilton 2 (14m, 30m), Lakeisha Tipene (46m), Naomi Kara (55m), Kimihia Rogers (68m), Nadia Flavell (76m); Con: Lakeisha Tipene (48m)		Try: Ilaisaane Taufa (41m); Con: Ilaisaane Taufa (41m)	Referee: Tevita Pauuvale

3 July	Otara Scorpion Stingers	8–30	Manurewa Wahine Kowhai	Ngati Otara Park 1
2:30	Try: Corina Vai (53m), Wati Delailomaloma (70m)		Try: Mackenzie Wiki (4m), Kerehitina Denise 3 (18m, 40m, 62m), Maitua Feterika 2 (23m, 67m); Con: Kerehitina Denise 3 (6m, 20m, 25m)	Referee: Bryan Barron

==== Round 9 ====
10 July	Ponsonby Women	20–34	Richmond Roses	Victoria Park 1
2:30	Try: Jennifer Reu, Sarah Filimoeatu, Phoenix Pivac, Cesca Luafalealo, Christina Andres		Try: Keri Ratima 2, Rowena Meleisea 2, Clementine Varea, Phillipa Smith, Charlize Tumu-Makara; Con: Laura Mariu 2, Clementine Varea	Referee: Aaronk Kesha

10 July	Taniwharau Women	6–36	Howick Hornets Women	Prince Edward Park 1
2:30	Try: Charlette Butler (1m); Con: Hope Parata-Kingi (2m)		Try: Melivina Weilert 2 (3m, 7m), Saphire Abraham (19m), Rebecca Taua (28m), Zayde Sarah-Baldwin (33m), Wendy Savieti (58m), Lisa Edwards Rua (59m); Con: Zayde Sarah-Baldwin 3 (35m, 59m, 62m); Pen: Zayde Sarah-Baldwin (6m)	Referee: Jason Heta

10 July	Otahuhu Leopards Women	6–60	Manurewa Wahine Kowhai	Bert Henham Park 1
2:30	Try: Unknown (9m); Con: Ilaisaane Taufa (11m)		Try: Kaylen Ikitule (1m), Harano Te Iringa (19m), Maitua Feterika 2 (24m, 32m), Terehia Matua 2 (36m, 48m), Mackenzie Wiki 2 (41m, 67m), Alexis Hapuku (54m), Lasalle Lefale (58m), Karley Te Kawa (71m), Harano Te Iringa (74m); Con: Kerehitina Denise 6 (25m, 38m, 42m, 69m, 72m, 75m)	Referee: Michael Analu

10 July	Otara Scorpion Stingers	8–24	Pt Chevalier Green	Ngati Otara Park 1
2:30	Try: Jaimee Taitoko (10m), Unknown (47m)		Try: Katelyn Vaha'akolo 2 (15m, 72m), Yasmin Puru-Tongia (27m), Va'anessa Molia-Fraser 2 (56m, 65m); Con: Tatiana Finau 2 (16m, 66m)	Referee: David Millar

==== Round 10 ====
The match between Howick and Richmond was played on Friday night, under lights at Paparoa Park, the home of Howick. Howick won a close fought game 22–14.

15 July	Howick Women	22–14	Richmond Roses	Paparoa Park 1
7:00	Try: Lovianna Fanene, Saphire Abraham, Melvina Weilert, Cilia-Maria Po'e-Tofaeono; Con: Zayde Sarah-Baldwin 3		Try: Charlize Tumu-Makara, Clementine Varea, Kahurina Cassidy; Con: Laura Mariu	Referee: Bryan Barron

17 July	Manurewa Wahine Kowhai	30–26	Pt Chevalier Green	Mountford Park: Jack Shelly
2:30	Try: Gloria-Hannah Murray-Fiu (16m), Kaylen Ikitule (21m), Alexis Hapuku (28m), Kerehitina Denise (31m), Terehia Matua (56m), Harano Te Iringa (60m); Con: Kerehitina Denise 3 (16m, 33m, 58m)		Try: Laishon Albert-Jones (2m), Katelyn Vaha'akolo 2 (10m, 75m), Unknown (43m), Unknown (66m); Con: Laishon Albert-Jones 2 (4m, 67m), Unknown (76m)	Referee: Aaronk Kesha

17 July	Otara Scorpion Stingers	52–10	Taniwharau	Ngati Otara Park 1
2:30	Try: Tessa Peace 3 (1m, 28m, 36m), Aketule McKinley-Sararaka 2 (7m, 47m), Annessa Biddle 3 (10m, 57m, 68m), Wati Delailomaloma 2 (19m, 77m); Con: Aketule McKinley-Sadaraka 5 (11m, 30m, 48m, 59m, 78m), Wati Delailomaloma (51m)		Try: Nadia Flavell (13m), Te Oriwa Ahuriri (39m); Con: Leah-Rhys Toka (40m)	Referee: Nigel Williams

17 July	Ponsonby Women	42–26	Otahuhu Women	Victoria Park 1
2:30	Try: Kathleen Noble, Debbie Ufipoa 2, Chance Vaipo, Mia Holo, Jennifer Reu, Pearl Tuitama, Kimiana Muriwai, Paige Irimana; Con: Charlotte Davis 3		Try: Onjeurlina Leiataua, Tafao Faaeaina Asaua 2, Tamara Ati, Cassius George; Con: Ilaisaane Taufa 3	Referee: Grant Smith

==== Round 11 ====
24 July	Manurewa Wahine Kowhai	64–6	Richmond Roses	Mountford Park: Jack Shelly
12:45	Try: Evelyn Tiriaere, Ricshay Lemanu 2, Lasalle Lefale, Mackenzie Wiki, Kaylen Ikutule, Kerehitina Denise 2, Kirsty Rapana, Kelly Maipi, Makayla Eli 2 Con: Kerehitina Denise 8		Try: Abigail Roache; Con: Rowena Meleisea	Referee: Nigel Williams

24 July	Howick Women	16–10	Leopards Women	Bert Henham Park 1
1:00	Try: Melvina Weilert 2 (33m, 51m), Lisa Edwards Rua (57m), Saphire Abraham (67m)		Try: Tafao Faaeaina Asaua 2 (16m, 78m); Con: Ilaisaane Taufa (80m)	Referee: Aaronk Kesha

24 July	Otara Scorpion Stingers	22–14	Ponsonby Women	Ngati Otara Park 1
2:30	Try: Christina Andres, Sarah Filimoeatu 2, Billy-Jean Ale, Moanekah Vaai; Con: Pearl Tuitama		Try: Tanika Jazz-Noble-Bell, Mele Hufanga 2, Con: Jhana Magele	Referee: David Millar

24 July	Pt Chevalier Green	WBD-LBD	Taniwharau
2:30

==== Round 12 ====
31 July	Manurewa Wahine Kowhai	30–24	Howick Women	Mt Smart Stadium 2
2:30	Try: Pahu Hepana (4m), Harano Te Iringa (42m), Kararaina Wira-Kohu 3 (50m, 63m, 76m), Carnetra Nathan (53m), Jodeci Joseph (75m); Con: Kararaina Wira-Kohu (55m), Ricshay Lemanu (64m)		Try: Melvina Weilert 2 (9m, 25m), Saphire Abraham 2 (19m, 66m), Jazmin Walker (60m); Con: Mollie Tagaloa 2 (61m, 68m)	Referee: David Millar

31 July	Ponsonby Women	26–0	Taniwharau	Victoria Park 1
1:00	Try: no scorers submitted		Try: no scorers submitted	Referee: Arnie Rongo

31 July	Pt Chevalier Green	44–0	Otahuhu Women	Walker Park 1
2:30	Try: no scorers submitted		Try: no scorers submitted	Referee: Tevita Pauuvale

31 July	Richmond Rovers	WBD-LBD	Otara Scorpion Stingers
2:30

==== Women's Premiership quarter finals ====
7 August	Pt Chevalier Green	24–20	Manurewa Wahine Kowhai	Walker Park 1
2:30	Try: Unknown (7m), Unknown (37m), Lanulangi Veainu 2 (43m, 64m), Unknown (60m); Con: Laishon Albert-Jones 2 (44m, 65m)		Try: Maitua Feterika (2m), Mackenzie Wiki (17m), Kaylen Ikutule (22m), Krystal Rota (79m); Con: Kararaina Wira-Kohu (3m), Kerehitina Denise (19m)	Referee: Aaronk Kesha

7 August	Otara Scorpions Stingers	8–20	Ponsonby Women	Ngati Otara Park 1
2:30	Try: Natasha Kennedy (57m), Tessa Peace (69m)		Try: Mele Hufanga 2, Miliania Cairns, Sarah Filimoeatu; Con: Jhana Magele 2	Referee: David Millar

==== Women's Premiership semifinal ====
14 August	Manurewa Wahine Kowhai	54–8	Ponsonby Women	Mountfort Park: Jack Shelly
2:30	Try: Amiria Te Iringa, Moana Cook, Kerehitina Denise, Krystal Rota, Harano Te Iringa, Maitua Feterika 2, Mackenzie Wiki 2 Con: Makayla Eli 2, Kerehitina Denise 5		Try: Mele Maatuleio Fotu-Moala, Mele Hufanga	Referee: Aaronk Kesha

==== Women's Premiership grand final ====
Maunurewa Kowhai won their first title with a 16–6 win over Pt Chevalier. The match had been scoreless until Monica Samita crossed for a Pt Chevalier try in the 48th minute. Manurewa retaliated with a try to Christyl Stowers before two late tries to Kararaina Wira Hohu and Kerehitina Denise gave them the lead and the win. The match was live streamed and broadcast on Sky TV.

7 August	Manurewa Kowhai	16–6	Pt Chevalier	Mt Smart #2
2:30	Try: Christyl Stowers (57m), Kararaina Wira Hohu (73m), Kerehitina Denise (80m); Con: Kerehitina Denise 2/3 (49m, 80m)		Try: Monica Samita (48m); Con: Angelina Ruaporo (50m)	Attendance: 500

=== Farrelly Photos Women's Championship ===
==== Standings ====
Team	Pld	W	D	L	B	F	A	%	Pts
Marist Saints Women	9	7	1	1	3	362	136	266.18%	21
Manukau Magpies Women	9	6	1	2	3	252	160	157.50%	19
Manurewa Wahine Whero	10	4	3	3	2	312	178	175.28%	15
Glenora Valkyries	10	3	0	7	2	194	318	61.01%	10
Pukekohe Pythons Women	10	1	1	8	2	122	450	27.11%	7

==== Round 1 ====
Manukau won a close match at Murray Halberg Park 30–28. They lost 3 players during the match to injury but hung on to win. Delainah Marsters scored twice for the winners, and Platinum Marsters kicked a crucial 5 conversions. Manurewa Whero made short work of the Pukekohe Pythons side winning 50–8, with Alexis Thompson scoring 3 tries and Kaylen Ikitule 2.

8 May	Manurewa Wahine Whero	50-8	Pukekohe Pythons Women	Mountfort Park, Jack Shelly
12:45	Try: Alexis Thompson 3, Kaylen Ikitule 2 + others unknown Con: unknown		Try: unknown	Referee: Michael Analu

8 May	Marist Saints Women	28–30	Manukau Magpies Women	Murray Halberg 1
2:30	Try: Roimata Amosa-Tiro (6m), Chantelle Schofield (31m), Christine Magele Mariner 2 (47m, 72m), Ana Mamea (61m); Con: Chantelle Schofield 4 (8m, 32m, 62m, 73m)		Try: Delainah Marsters 2 (16m, 52m), Caroline Kimi (24m), Fononga Veikoso (41m), Maraea Tupouniua (69m); Con: Platinum Marsters 5 (18m, 25m, 43m, 53m, 69m)	Referee: Warren Clarke

==== Round 2 ====
After a narrow loss the week before Marist gained a close fought 6 try to 5 win over Manurewa Whero by 28 points to 22 at Murray Halberg Park. They led 18–4 before Manurewa scored 18 unanswered points to take a 22–18 lead. Marist tied the scores and then with 3 minutes left Ana Mamea crossed for the winning try, which Chantelle Schofield converted.

15 May	Manukau Magpies Women	28-8	Glenora Valkyries	Moyle Park 2
2:30	Try: 5 tries Con: 4 conversions		Try: Faonelua Hafoka, Mafi Faukafa

15 May	Marist Saints Women	28-22	Manurewa Wahine Whero	Murray Halberg Park 1
2:30	Try: Hellen Tafa (5m), unknown (9m), Chantelle Schofield (13m), Christina Magele Mariner (28m), unknown (70m), Ana Mamea (77m); Con: Chantelle Schofield 2 (14m, 79m)		Try: Unknown (21m, 33m, 41m, 61m, 65m); Con: Unknown (41m)	Referee: Aaronk Kesha

==== Round 3 ====
Pukekohe only had 11 players put still put in a strong effort to only concede 12 tries while scoring 3 of their own, 2 of which were to Savarna Asafo-Tavita, one of which she converted. Peaches Peters scored a hat trick for Manurewa but a late converted try to Delainah Marsters meant the match finished a 22–22 draw.

22 May	Glenora Valkyries	56–14	Pukekohe Pythons Women	Harold Moody 1
2:30	Try: 12 Tries (unknown); Con: 4 Conversions (unknown)		Try: Savarna Asafo-Tavita, Ocean Tierney 2 Con: Savarna Asafo-Tavita	Referee: Warren Clarke

22 May	Manurewa Wahine Whero	22–22	Manukau Magpies Women	Mountfort Park, Jack Shelly
12:45	Try: Peaches Peters 3 (9m, 13m, 54m), Lavinia McGee-Repia (39m), Sarina Clark (71m); Con: Grace Tautahi (72m)		Try: Danika Manase (4m), Alisi Mafi (43m), Seifua Leatisolomua (50m), Delainah Marsters (75m); Con: Platinum Marsters 2 (5m, 44m), Roni Lee Nuku-Dawson (77m)	Referee: Bryan Barron

==== Round 4 ====
Chantelle Schofield scored 2 tries and kicked 4 conversions in Marists 48–14 win over Pukekohe with Christina Magele Mariner, Nevaeh-Leigh Ormsby, and Ana Mamea also scoring doubles. Glenora Valkyries scored their second consecutive win by beating Manurewa Whero 28–14 at Harold Moody Park in a 6 try performance.

29 May	Pukekohe Pythons Women	14-48	Marist Saints Women	Opaheke Sports Park 1
12:45	Try: Unknown (32m, 46m, 60m); Con: Unknown (33m)		Try: Chantelle Schofield 2 (1m, 20m), Dreya Lilo (10m), Christina Magele Mariner 2 (13m, 56m), Paris Filitonga (24m), Nevaeh-Leigh Ormsby 2 (27m, 37m), Ana Mamea 2 (52m, 64m); Con: Chantelle Schofield 4 (2m, 22m, 53m, 57m)	Referee: Tevita Pauuvale

29 May	Glenora Valkyries	28-14	Manurewa Wahine Whero	Harold Moody 1
2:30	Try: Alyssa Malamatenios (10m), Unknown (20m), Faonelua Hafoka (27m), Unknown (50m), Mafi Faukafa (64m), Monica Tuala (78m); Con: Unknown (12m), Alyssa Malamatenios (22m)		Try: Unknown (4m, 37m, 73m); Con: Unknown (74m)	Referee: Warren Clarke

==== Round 5 ====
12 June	Marist Saints Women	38-8	Glenora Valkyries	Murray Halberg Park 1
2:30	Try: Elfredda Magele (3m, 31m), Christina Magele Mariner (16m, 21m, 34m), Joanne Seumalo (42m), Ana Mamea (52m); Con: Chantelle Schofield 5 (4m, 17m, 23m, 43m, 53m)		Try: Unknown (48m), Unknown (58m)	Referee: Aaronk Kesha

12 June	Manukau Magpies Women	36-16	Pukekohe Pythons Women	Moyle Park 1
2:30	Try: Delainah Marsters 2 (4m, 40m), Jo'res Taramai-Remo (16m), Lose Mafi (19m), Alisi Mafi (30m), Daysha Tango-Rairi (33m), Seifua Leatisolomua Pio (60m), Lourdes Tuiala (63m); Con: Platinum Marsters 2 (17m, 61m)		Try: Unknown (8m), Unknown (11m), Unknown (54m); Con: Kaylia Fraser-Le'au 2 (9m, 55m)	Referee: Tevita Pauuvale

==== Round 6 ====
19 June	Manukau Magpies Women	18-22	Marist Saints Women	Moyle Park 1
2:30	Try: no scorers submitted		Try: no scorers submitted	Referee: Tevita Pauuvale

19 June	Pukekohe Pythons	28-28	Manurewa Wahine Whero	Opaheke Sports Park 2
2:30	Try: no scorers submitted		Try: no scorers submitted	Referee: Jason Heta

==== Round 7 ====
26 June	Manurewa Wahine Whero	12-12	Marist Saints Women	Mountfort Park: Jack Shelly
12:45	Try: Unknown (30m, 48m); Con: Unknown (32m, 49m)		Try: Christina Magele Mariner (42m, 74m); Con: Chantelle Schofeld (44m, 76m)	Referee: Tevita Pauuvale

26 June	Glenora Valkyries	22-26	Manukau Magpies	Harold Moody Park 1
2:30	Try: no scorers submitted		Try: no scorers submitted	Referee: Simon Bailey

==== Round 8 ====
3 July	Pukekohe Pythons Women	32-28	Glenora Valkyries	Opaheke Sports Park 1
2:30	Try: Lilliarn Asafo 2, Kaila Rapana, Azania Watene, Lauryn Rhind, Rina Paraone; Con: Savarna Asafo-Tavita 4		Try: Unknown 5 Con: Unknown 4	Referee: Jason Heta

3 July	Manukau Magpies Women	38-14	Manurewa Wahine Whero	Moyle Park 2
2:30	Try: Danika Manase (1m), Delainah Marsters 2 (6m, 63m), Cassandra Tere 2 (12m, 47m), Alisi Mafi (25m), Roseleen Rave 2 (55m, 59m); Con: Platinum Marsters 3 (7m, 14m, 49m)		Try: Alexis Hapuku (32m), Aleasha Brider (38m), Grace Tautuhi (77m); Con: Grace Tautuhi (79m)	Referee: Nigel Williams

==== Round 9 ====
10 July	Manurewa Wahine Whero	60-0	Glenora Valkyries	Mountfort Park: Jack Shelly
12:45	Try: Unknown (3m), Unknown (10m), Unknown (18m), Unknown 21m), Unknown (25m), Unknown (31m), Unknown (40m), Unknown (47m), Unknown (61m), Unknown (64m), Unknown (68m), Unknown (72m); Con: Unknown (10m, 11m, 20m, 22m, 32m, 66m)			Referee: Tevita Pauuvale

10 July	Marist Saints Women	82-8	Pukekohe Pythons Women	Margaret Griffen Park 2
1:00	Try: Paris Filitonga 2 (2m, 77m), Harmony Mariner (7m), Hayley Smith (11m), Angelina Tuese (15m), Joanne Seumalo 2 (24m, 36m), Navaeh-Leigh Ormsby 2 (40m, 67m), Christina Magele Mariner (44m), Chantelle Schofield 3 (49m, 71m, 74m), Hayley Masame (64m); Con: Chantelle Schofield 13 (3m, 8m, 12m, 16m, 25m, 37m, 40m, 45m, 50m, 65m, 72m, 75m, 78m)		Try: Unknown (53m), Unknown (59m)	Referee: Nigel Williams

==== Round 10 ====
17 July	Glenora	14-44	Marist	Harold Moody 1
2:30	Try: Unknown (46m, 67m, 74m); Con: Unknown 76m)		Try: Christina Magele Mariner 3 (2m, 20m, 50m), Elfredda Magele 2 (5m, 29m), Angelina Tuese (16m), Harmony Mariner (36m), Paris Filotonga (42m), Sini Magele (54m), Hellen Tafa (61m); Con: Chantelle Schofield 2 (3m, 21m)	Referee: David Millar

17 July	Pukekohe	no score reported	Manukau	Opaheke Sports Park 2
2:30				Referee: Tevita Pauuvale

==== Round 11 ====
24 July	Glenora	WBD-LBD	Pythons
2:30

24 July	Manurewa Wahine Whero	28–22	Manukau Women	Mountfort Park: Jack Shelly
2:30	Try: Aleasha Brider 2 (22m, 63m), France Bloomfield (25m), Lavinia Mcgee-Repia (43m), Peaches Peters (48m); Con: France Bloomfield 4 (22m, 26m, 46m, 64m)		Try: Danika Manase 2 (15m, 28m), Lourdes Tuiala 3 (53m, 76m, 80m); Con: Lourdes Tuiala (17m)	Referee: Michael Analu

==== Round 12 ====
31 July	Glenora Valkyries	0–62	Manurewa Wahine Whero	Mt Smart Stadium 2
12:45			Try: Sarina Clark 3 (6m, 14m, 48m), Arahina Boyce 2 (18m, 30m), Alix Leaupepe (24m), Peaches Peters 2 (57m, 65m), Amber Kani (57m), Lavinia McGee-Repia (70m), France Bloomfield (74m), Julian Poona (80m); Con: France Bloomfield 7 (7m, 25m, 49m, 57m, 74m, 75m, 80m)	Referee: Nigel Williams

31 July	Pukekohe Pythons	10–60	Marist Saints	Opaheke Sports Park 2
2:30	Try: Unknown (36m), Unknown 43m); Con: Unknown (44m)		Try: Cristina Magele Mariner 2 (1m, 69m), Hellen Tafa (5m), Sini Magele (15m), Margaret Vaiouga (19m), Jasmine Mckillop 2 (27m, 57m), Angelina Tuese 2 (32m, 66m), Hayley Smith (47m), Joanne Seumalo (54m); Con: Sini Magele 8 (5m, 20m, 28m, 34m, 48m, 55m, 67m, 70m)	Referee: Michael Analu

==== Women's Championship quarter finals ====
7 August	Marist Saints Women	16–24	Manukau Magpies Women	Murray Halberg Park 1
2:30	Try: Harmony Mariner (21m), Christina Magele Mariner (41m), Nevaeh-Leigh Ormsby (54m); Con: Chantelle Schofield 2 (42m, 55m)		Try: Alisi Mafi (7m), Paulina Teraitua-Siaosi (16m), Lose Mafi (27m), Salataima Frost (34m), Alisi Mafi (78m); Con: Platinum Marsters 2 (17m, 35m)	Referee: Nigel Williams

7 August	Manurewa Wahine Whero	40–12	Glenora Valkyries	Walker Park 2
2:30	Try: Unknown 8 (12m, 19m, 23m, 45m, 49m, 54m, 62m, 67m), Con: Unknown 4 (11m, 55m, 63m, 67m)		Try: Unknown 2 (15m, 78m); Con: Unknown 2 (16m, 79m)	Referee: Tevita Pauuvale

==== Women's Championship semi final ====
14 August	Marist Saints Women	6–42	Manurewa Wahine Whero	Murray Halberg Park 1
2:30	Try: Faaitiiti Nuuausala (1m); Con: Chantelle Schofield (1m)		Try: Peaches Peters 2 (8m, 15m), Cammy Ball (11m), Grace Tautuhi (28m), Shanaia Puna 2 (55m, 63m), Erikah Hewett-Martin (71m), Naumai-aaria Wall (79m); Con: France Bloomfield 5 (9m, 13m, 29m, 64m, 72m)	Referee: Nigel Williams

==== Women's Championship grand final ====
Maunurewa Whero defeated Manukau 34–18 in the championship final after leading 24 to 8 at halftime. Peaches Peters crossed for 4 tries for Manurewa. The match was live streamed and broadcast on Sky TV.

7 August	Manurewa Wahine Whero	16–6	Manukau	Mt Smart Stadium 2
2:30	Try: Peaches Peters 4 (9m, 32m, 67m, 80m), Julian Poona (12m), Shanaia Puna (16m), Maumai-Aaria Wall (34m); Con: France Bloomfield 3/7 (14m, 17m, 80m)		Try: Toakase Filimoehala (23m), Lourdes Tuiala (27m), Alice Mafi (47m), Lose Mafi (60m); Con: Platinum Marsters 0/3, Lourdes Tuiala (21m)	Attendance: 500; Referee: Aaronk Keesha

== Lower grades ==
=== Reserve grade (Premier firsts) competition ===
==== Section 1 standings ====
Team	Pld	W	D	L	B	F	A	%	Pts
Manukau Magpies	8	6	0	2	1	414	134	308.96%	14
Mt Albert Lions	8	6	0	2	1	236	157	150.32%	14
Howick Hornets	8	5	1	2	1	312	158	197.47%	13
Pt Chevalier Pirates	8	5	1	2	1	329	210	156.67%	13
Manurewa Marlins	8	4	0	4	1	250	232	107.76%	10
Northcote Tigers	8	3	2	3	1	228	214	106.54%	10
Otara Scorpions	8	2	2	4	1	200	298	67.11%	8
Bay Roskill Vikings	8	2	0	6	1	192	270	71.11%	6
Hibiscus Coast Raiders	8	0	0	8	1	46	534	8.61%	2

==== Section 1 results ====
	Date		Score		Score	Referee	Venue
Round 1	7 May	Howick	22	Mt Albert	36	Maxine Godinet	Paparoa Park 1, 12:45
		Pt Chevalier	40	Bay Roskill	26	Jaxon McGowan	Walker Park 1, 12:45
		Hibiscus Coast	4	Northcote	94	Grant Smith	Stanmore Bay 1, 12:45
		Manukau	38	Manurewa	10	Davey Misileki	Moyle Park 1, 12:45
Round 2	14 May	Bay Roskill	38	Howick	34	Nigel Williams	Blockhouse Bay Reserve 3, 12:45
		Northcote	26	Mt Albert	8	Grant Smith	Birkenhead War Memorial 4, 12:45
		Otara	32	Pt Chevalier	32	Karl Vasau	Ngati Otara 1, 12:45
		Manurewa	72	Hibiscus Coast	6	-	Mountfort Park, Jack Shelly, 12:45
Round 3	21 May	Howick	18	Northcote	18	Andrew Harris	Paparoa Park 1, 12:45
		Bay Roskill	22	Otara	42	Maxine Godinet	Blockhouse Bay Reserve 3, 12:45
		Mt Albert	30	Manurewa	20	Nigel Williams	Fowlds Park 1, 12:45
		Pt Chevalier	0	Manukau	90	Grant Smith	Walker Park 1, 12:45
Round 4	28 May	Otara	8	Howick	42	Maxine Godinet	Ngati Otara Park 1, 12:45
		Manurewa	44	Northcote	18	Davey Misileki	Mountfort Park, Jack Shelly 12:45
		Manukau	56	Bay Roskill	16	Karl Vasau	Moyle Park 1, 12:45
		Pt Chevalier	82	Hibiscus Coast	0	Nigel Williams	Walker Park 1, 12:45
Round 5	11 June	Howick	34	Manurewa	14	Andrew Harris	Paparoa Park 1, 12:45
		Otara	16	Manukau	58	Simon Bailey	Ngati Otara Park, 12:45
		Bay Roskill	WBD	Hibiscus Coast	LBD	-	Blockhouse Bay Reserve 3, 12:45
		Mt Albert	14	Pt Chevalier	25	David Millar	Fowlds Park 1, 12:45
Round 6	18 June	Manukau	18	Howick	28	Maxine Godinet	Moyle Park 1, 12:45
		Hibiscus Coast	24	Otara	38	Grant Smith	Stanmore Bay, 12:45
		Pt Chevalier	66	Northcote	4	Davey Misileki	Walker Park 1, 12:45
		Mt Albert	30	Bay Roskill	16	Nigel Williams	Fowlds Park 1, 12:45
Round 7	25 June	Manukau	82	Hibiscus Coast	12	-	Moyle Park 1, 12:45
		Manurewa	12	Pt Chevalier	52	Tevita Pauuvale	Mountfort Park: Jack Shelly, 12:45
		Otara	18	Mt Albert	54	Maxine Godinet	Ngati Otara Park 1, 12:45
		Northcote	26	Bay Roskill	8	John Darbyshire	Birkenhead War Memorial 4, 12:45
Round 8	2 July	Hibiscus Coast	0	Howick	106	John Darbyshire	Stanmore Bay 1, 12:45
		Mt Albert	34	Manukau	30	Nigel Williams	Fowld's Park 1, 12:45
		Bay Roskill	32	Manurewa	36	Simon Bailey	Blockhouse Bay Reserve 4, 12:45
		Northcote	24	Otara	24	Grant Smith	Birkenhead War Memorial 4, 12:45
Round 9	9 July	Howick	28	Pt Chevalier	26	Tevita Pauuvale	Paparoa Park 1, 12:45
		Hibiscus Coast	LBD	Mt Albert	WBD	-	Stanmore Bay 1, 12:45
		Northcote	18	Manukau	42	Grant Smith	Birkenhead War Memorial 4, 12:45
		Manurewa	42	Otara	22	Karl Vasau	Mountford Park: Jack Shelly, 12:45

==== Section 2 standings ====
Team	Pld	W	D	L	F	A	%	Pts
Te Atatu Roosters	9	9	0	0	442	86	513.95%	18
Otahuhu Leopards	9	8	0	1	348	94	370.21%	16
Marist Saints	9	7	0	2	260	150	173.33%	14
Richmond Rovers	9	6	0	3	280	182	153.85%	12
Mangere East Hawks	9	5	0	4	270	300	90%	10
Glenora Bears	9	4	0	5	306	228	134.21%	8
Pakuranga Jaguars	9	2	0	7	192	332	57.83%	6
Papatoetoe Panthers	9	2	0	7	108	314	34.39%	4
Glenfield (P)	9	1	0	8	128	306	41.83%	2
Papakura Sea Eagles	9	0	0	9	60	402	14.93%	0

==== Section 2 results ====
	Date		Score		Score	Referee	Venue
Round 1	7 May	Pakuranga	30	Richmond	36	Bryan Barron	Ti Rakau Park 1, 12:45
		Papakura	0	Papatoetoe	34	Karl Vasau	Prince Edward Park 1, 12:45
		Te Atatu	56	Mangere East	0	Johnnie Sekene	Jack Colvin Park 1, 12:45
		Otahuhu	46	Glenora	6	Nigel Williams	Bert Henham Park 1, 12:45
		Marist	48	Glenfield-P	16	Tevita Pauuvale	Murray Halberg Park 1, 12:45
Round 2	13 May	Glenfield (P)	0	Te Atatu	68	Grant Smith	Sunnynook Park 1, 7:30pm
	14 May	Papatoetoe	22	Pakuranga	24	Tevita Pauuvale	Kohuora Park 1, 12:45
		Mangere East	4	Richmond	64	Davey Misileki	Walter Massey 1, 12:45
		Glenora	64	Papakura	4	-	Harold Moody 1, 12:45
		Otahuhu	32	Marist	20	Maxine Godinet	Bert Henham Park 1, 12:45
Round 3	21 May	Pakuranga	32	Mangere East	40	Tevita Pauuvale	Ti Rakau Park 1, 12:45pm
		Papatoetoe	10	Glenora	60	Davey Misileki	Kohuora Park 1, 12:45
		Papakura	LBD	Marist	WBD	-	Prince Edward Park 1, 12:45
		Te Atatu	24	Otahuhu	16	Jaxon McGowan	Jack Colvin Park 1, 12:45
		Richmond	38	Glenfield (P)	24	Johnnie Sekene	Grey Lynn Park 1, 12:45
Round 4	28 May	Glenora	56	Pakuranga	18	Grant Smith	Harold Moody 1, 12:45pm
		Glenfield (P)	16	Mangere East	38	Vernon Nathan	Sunnynook Park 1, 12:45
		Marist	-	Papatoetoe	-	Tevita Pauuvale	Murray Halberg Park 1, 12:45
		Otahuhu	22	Richmond	6	Jaxon McGowan	Bert Henham Park 1, 12:45
		Papakura	16	Te Atatu	50	Raimona Marks	Prince Edward Park 1, 12:45
Round 5	11 June	Pakuranga	16	Glenfield (P)	6	Tevita Pauuvale	Ti Rakau Park 1, 12:45pm
		Glenora	18	Marist	20	Maxine Godinet	Harold Moody 1, 12:45
		Mangere East	24	Otahuhu	34	Grant Smith	Walter Massey Park 1, 12:45
		Papatoetoe	0	Te Atatu	80	Poriau Uamaki	Kohuora Park 1, 12:45
		Richmond	40	Papakura	10	Leigh Fletcher	Grey Lynn Park 2, 12:45
Round 6	19 June	Marist	40	Pakuranga	12	Karl Vasau	Murray Halberg Park 1, 12:45pm
		Te Atatu	42	Glenora	14	David Millar	Jack Colvin 1, 12:45
		Papakura	30	Mangere East	56	Tevita Pauuvale	Prince Edward Park 1, 12:45
		Richmond	20	Papatoetoe	0	Simon Bailey	Grey Lynn Park 1, 12:45
		Otahuhu	WBD	Glenfield (P)	LBD	-	Bert Henham Park 1, 12:45
Round 7	24 June	Glenfield (P)	WBD	Papakura	LBD	Grant Smith	Sunnynook Park 1, 12:30pm
	25 June	Pakuranga	14	Otahuhu	74	Simon Bailey	Ti Rakau Park 1, 12:45
		Marist	10	Te Atatu	28	Grant Smith	Murray Halberg Park 1, 12:45
		Glenora	20	Richmond	38	Warren Clarke	Harold Moody Park 1, 12:45
		Mangere East	52	Papatoetoe	10	Nigel Williams	Walter Massey Park 1, 12:45
Round 8	2 July	Te Atatu	58	Pakuranga	14	Davey Misileki	Jack Colvin Park 1, 12:45pm
		Papakura	0	Otahuhu	68	-	Prince Edward Park 1, 12:45
		Richmond	22	Marist	34	Maxine Godinet	Grey Lynn Park 1, 12:45
		Papatoetoe	32	Glenfield (P)	18	Tevita Pauuvale	Kohuora Park 1, 12:45
		Mangere East	34	Glenora	32	Karl Vasau	Walter Massey Park 1, 12:45
Round 9	9 July	Pakuranga	WBD	Papakura	LBD	-	Ti Rakau Park 1, 12:45pm
		Te Atatu	36	Richmond	16	Maxine Godinet	Jack Colvin Park 1, 12:45
		Otahuhu	WBD	Papatoetoe	LBD	-	Bert Henham Park 1, 12:45
		Marist	28	Mangere East	22	Davey Misileki	Murray Halberg Park 1, 12:45
		Glenfield (P)	18	Glenora	36	Warren Clarke	Sunnynook Park 1, 12:45

==== Fox Premier Firsts finals ====
The Richmond - Mangere East preliminary final was streamed by Petes Filming. In the Fox Premiership First quarter finals Te Atatu scored a last minute try, with the long serving Nick Lythgo's conversion sending the match into extra time. Lythgo kicked a penalty goal during extra time and Te Atatu hung on for a tense 36–34 win to maintain their 10–0 unbeaten record. Te Atatu had the right to play their match at Jack Colvin Park in Te Atatu due to being the higher qualifier but allowed the match to be played at Glenora's ground to allow the supporters to see both matches. Otahuhu beat Mangere East 56–16 to advance to meet Te Atatu in the section 2 playoff match. The young Manukau side beat Pt Chevalier 22–18 at Moyle Park and progressed to the section 1 final to play Howick who upset Mt Albert at Fowlds Park 30–20. In the semi-finals Te Atatu came from 4–10 down at halftime to lead 22–10 late before Otahuhu scored a consolation try. Pt Chevalier defeated the home side, Manukau, 26–20 to advance to the final. In the grand final Pt Chevalier took a 12–0 lead into halftime and extended it to 18–0 before Te Atatu scored a converted try late in the match with Pt Chevalier hanging on for an 18–6 victory, and in the process handing Te Atatu their only defeat of the season. The match was streamed on Petes Filming.

	Date		Score		Score	Referee	Venue
Section 1 preliminary final	16 July	Howick	50	Northcote	10	Karl Vasau	Paparoa Park 1, 12:45
Section 1 preliminary final		Pt Chevalier	30	Manurewa	17	Maxine Godinet	Walker Park 1, 12:45
Section 2 preliminary final	16 July	Marist	18	Glenora	20	Nigel Williams	Murray Halberg, 12:45
Section 2 preliminary final		Richmond	14	Mangere East	24	Grant Smith	Grey Lynn Park 3, 12:45
Section 1 quarter final	23 July	Manukau	22	Howick	18	Grant Smith	Moyle Park 1, 12:45
Section 1 quarter final		Mt Albert	20	Pt Chevalier	30	David Millar	Fowlds Park 1, 12:45
Section 2 quarter final	23 July	Glenora	34	Te Atatu	36	Keven Ah Ken	Harold Moody 1, 12:45
Section 2 quarter final		Otahuhu	56	Mangere East	16	Karl Vasau	Bert Henham Park 1, 12:45
Section 1 semi final	30 July	Manukau	20	Pt Chevalier	26	David Millar	Moyle Park 1, 12:45
Section 2 semi final	30 July	Te Atatu	22	Otahuhu	14	Nigel Williams	Jack Colvin Park, 2:30
Grand final	5 August	Pt Chevalier	18	Te Atatu	6	Maxine Godinet	Mt Smart Stadium 2, 8:00

==== Fox Championship Premier Firsts finals ====
The Fox Championship Premier First competition was competed for by sides who had finished in the bottom 3 of section 1 and bottom 2 of section 2. Bay Roskill Vikings defeated Otara Scorpions at Mt Smart Stadium 2 on Friday night, August 5 by 22 points to 14. The match was streamed by Petes Filming.

	Date		Score		Score	Referee	Venue
Section 1 preliminary final	16 July	Otara	16	Bay Roskill	38	Simon Bailey	Blockhouse Bay Reserve 3, 12:45
Section 2 preliminary final	16 July	Pakuranga	30	Papatoetoe	28	Tevita Pauuvale	Ti Rakau Park 1, 12:45
Section 2 preliminary final	16 July	Glenfield (P)	34	Papakura	20	John Darbyshire	Sunnynook Park 1, 12:45
Section 1 quarter final	23 July	Otara	WBD	Hibiscus Coast	LBD	-	-
Section 2 quarter final	23 July	Papatoetoe	32	Glenfield (P)	28	Davey Misileki	Kohuora Park 1
Section 1 semi final	30 July	Bay Roskill	52	Papatoetoe	10	Simon Bailey	Blockhouse Bay Reserve 1
Section 2 semi final	30 July	Pakuranga	18	Otara	34	Davey Misileki	Ti Rakau Park 1
Grand final	5 August	Bay Roskill	22	Otara	14	Nigel Williams	Mt Smart Stadium 2

=== Ray Cranch Senior B ===
There were 12 teams competing in the Ray Cranch Senior B competition with Otara entering 2 sides. The Takahiwai rugby league club based in Ruakaka, Northland entered a senior side in the competition and they took out the minor premiership. The Avondale Wolves were affiliated to the Marist Saints club but had a long history stretching back several decades. The Waitemata Seagulls side was principally their senior side which had withdrawn from the Fox Memorial competition at the start of the year. The match between Waitemata and Richmond on May 28 was ruled "null and void" by the judiciary with neither side awarded any points.

Team	Pld	W	D	L	B	F	A	%	Pts
Takahiwai (Northpine Warriors)	11	10	1	0	0	456	146	312.33%	21
Pukekohe Pythons	12	9	0	3	0	454	188	241.49%	18
Avondale Wolves	11	8	0	3	1	422	204	206.86%	18
Ponsonby Central Stallions	12	8	1	3	0	388	204	190.20%	17
Waitemata Seagulls	11	8	1	2	0	320	218	146.79%	17
Richmond Tokes	10	7	0	3	1	288	208	138.46%	16
Otahuhu Leopards	11	6	0	5	0	283	238	118.91%	14
East Coast Bays	12	4	1	7	0	276	400	69%	9
Manurewa Marlins	12	3	0	9	0	250	363	68.87%	6
Otara No Excuses	12	2	0	10	0	188	510	36.86%	4
Otara Wymondley Strong	11	0	0	11	0	138	464	29.74%	0
Point Chevalier Green	10	0	0	10	0	80	406	19%	0

==== Ray Cranch playoffs ====
The quarter finals were split into top 4 (1v2 & 3v4), and the teams who finished 5th to 8th (5v6 & 7v8). The lower ranked teams won 3 of the 4 matches with the Avondale Wolves being the only home team to win, beating Ponsonby Central Stallions 26–8 at Murray Halberg Park (they are affiliated with the Marist club). The two finalists were Pukekohe Pythons and Takahiwai Northpine Warriors who had finished first and second after the regular season. Pukekohe won the grand final 25–24 at Sunnynook Park on August 20. The curtain-raiser was for the consolation final and was won by Richmond Tokes 36–14 over East Coast Bays.

	Date		Score		Score	Referee	Venue
Quarter-final 1 v 2	6 August	Takahiwai	18	Pukekohe	32	Kelvin Rambaud	Whangateau Domain 1, 2:30
Quarter-final 3 v 4		Avondale	26	Ponsonby	8	Vernon Nathan	Murray Halberg Park 1, 2:30
Minor semi final	13 August	Takahiwai	24	Avondale	22	Vernon Nathan	Whangateau Domain 1, 2:30
Ray Cranch Premier Final	20 August	Pukekohe	25	Takahiwai	24	Vernon Nathan, David Millar (TJ)	Sunnynook Park 1, 2:30

	Date		Score		Score	Referee	Venue
Quarter-final 5 v 6	6 August	Waitemata	14	Richmond	18	John Darbyshire	Ranui Domain 1, 2:30
Quarter-final 7 v 8		Otahuhu	20	East Coast Bays	32	Greg McIntyre	Bert Henham Park 1, 2:30
Minor semi final	13 August	Waitemata	20	East Coast Bays	24	Greg McIntyre	Ranui Domain 1, 2:30
Consolation Final	20 August	Richmond	36	East Coast Bays	14	Greg McIntyre, David Millar (TJ)	Sunnynook Park 1, 12:00

=== Junior competitions ===
==== Grand finals ====
	Date					Referee	Venue
U18 Boys	20 Aug	Otara Spartans	58	Mt Albert	6	Viggo Rasmussen	Mt Smart 2, 4:00
U18 Girls	21 Aug	Otara	32	Howick Eastern United	24	Karl Vasau	Mt Smart 2, 11:00
U16 Boys	20 Aug	Marist Gold	22	Mangere East	20	Abel Marsters	Mt Smart 2, 2:30
U16 Girls	20 Aug	Mangere East	16	Howick Eastern United	12	Tevita Pauuvale	Mountfort Park, 2:30
U15 Boys	20 Aug	Papatoetoe	24	Ellerslie	16	Raimona Marks	Mt Smart 2, 1:00
U14 Boys	20 Aug	Mt Albert	18	Otahuhu	16	Kelvin Rambaud	Mt Smart 2, 11:45
U14 Girls	20 Aug	Mangere East Elite Bella Hawks	28	Richmond Rosebuds	16	Brent Newton	Mountfort Park, 11:45
U13 Boys	20 Aug	Ellerslie Easts Eagles	22	Mangere East Commando Hawks	18	James Priest	Mt Smart 2, 10:30

==== Under 18 Boys ====
Otara Scorpions won the final against Mount Albert Lions by 58 points to 6. The match was live streamed from Mt Smart #2 field. Mangere East defaulted 3 matches and Ellerslie defaulted 1 match.

Team	Pld	W	D	L	B	F	A	%	Pts
Otahuhu Leopards	8	7	0	1	1	258	72	358.33%	16
Otara Spartans	7	6	0	1	2	288	110	261.82%	16
Mount Albert Lions	7	3	0	4	2	168	190	88.42%	10
Ellerslie Eagles	7	1	1	5	1	146	260	56.15%	7
Mangere East Hawks	7	0	1	6	2	54	282	19.15%	5

==== Under 18 Girls ====
Otara defeated Howick Eastern United by 32 points to 24. The match was live streamed on sky sport and YouTube.

Team	Pld	W	D	L	B	F	A	%	Pts
Otara Scorpions	8	8	0	0	1	266	24	1108.33%	18
Howick Eastern United	7	5	0	2	2	214	126	169.84%	14
Otahuhu Leopards	7	3	0	4	2	144	122	118.03%	10
Taniwharau	7	1	0	6	2	82	304	26.97%	6

==== Under 16 Boys ====
Marist Saints came back from 20–4 down to beat Mangere East Hawks 22–20 in the final which was played on Mt Smart #2. The match was live streamed on Auckland Rugby League's YouTube channel. Marist and Waitemata both defaulted one match each.

Team	Pld	W	D	L	B	F	A	%	Pts
Marist Saints Gold	10	9	0	1	0	360	82	439.02%	18
Mangere East Hawks	9	8	0	1	1	300	74	405.41%	18
New Lynn Stags	10	6	0	3	1	344	230	149.57%	13
Papakura Sea Eagles	9	4	0	5	0	168	208	80.77%	8
Richmond Rovers	9	3	0	6	1	184	238	77.31%	8
Otara Scorpions Wolfpack	10	3	1	6	0	246	256	96.09%	7
Otahuhu Leopards	10	3	0	7	0	242	266	90.98%	6
Waitemata Seagulls	7	0	0	7	0	12	502	2.39%	0

==== Under 16 Girls ====
The Mangere East Hawks 'Queenz' won the grand final, defeating Howick Hornets 'Eastern United' by 16 points to 12 at Mountfort Park. Mt Albert Blue defaulted 2 matches as did Richmond Rosebuds, while Glenora, Manurewa and Howick all defaulted one match each.

Team	Pld	W	D	L	B	F	A	%	Pts
Howick Eastern United	9	8	0	1	1	342	78	438.46%	18
Mangere East Queenz	10	8	0	2	0	362	58	624.14%	16
Otahuhu Angels	9	7	0	2	1	216	86	251.16%	16
Mt Albert/Marist	9	6	0	3	1	222	158	140.51%	14
Manurewa Marlins	10	5	0	5	1	196	186	105.38%	10
Glenora Bears	8	3	0	5	2	178	186	95.7%	10
Taniwharau Taniwha	8	3	0	5	2	112	202	55.45%	10
Richmond Rosebuds	9	1	0	8	1	50	408	12.25%	4
Mt Albert Blue	9	0	0	9	1	48	334	14.37%	42

==== Under 15 Boys ====
Papatoetoe Panthers (Pumas) beat Ellerslie Eagles 24–16 in the grand final at Mt Smart #2 after coming back from 16 to 10 down. The match was live streamed on the Auckland Rugby League YouTube channel. Manukau withdrew from the competition after playing 3 games and defaulting one other. Pukekohe defaulted 4 matches, and Bay Roskill one.

Team	Pld	W	D	L	B	F	A	%	Pts
Ellerslie Eagles	9	9	0	0	1	284	44	645.45%	20
Papatoetoe Pumas	10	9	0	1	0	416	77	540.26%	18
Otahuhu Blue	10	8	0	2	0	304	86	353.49%	16
Marist Saints	9	7	0	2	1	308	90	342.22%	16
Northcote: Central Harbour United	9	6	0	3	1	206	128	160.94%	14
Otara Scorpions	9	4	0	5	1	240	142	169.01%	10
Te Atatu Roosters	9	4	0	5	1	206	252	81.75%	10
Manurewa Brothers	10	4	0	6	0	204	234	87.18%	8
Bay Roskill Vikings	10	4	0	6	0	190	236	80.51%	8
Mount Albert Lions	9	2	1	6	1	168	300	56%	7
Manukau Magpies	4	1	1	2	1	54	134	40.3%	5
Papakura Duckrockers	8	1	0	7	1	81	320	25.31%	4
Pukekohe Pythons	9	0	0	9	1	22	426	5.16%	2

==== Under 14 Boys ====
The Under 14 grade was split into 2 sections of 8 teams and 7 teams respectively. Otahuhu finished first in section 1 and Mt Albert first in section 2. Mt Albert won the final by 18 points to 16 over Otahuhu on Mt Smart #2. The match was live streamed on the Auckland Rugby League YouTube channel. One of the Manurewa teams (Manurewa Black) was based in Ngāruawāhia.

Section 1

Team	Pld	W	D	L	B	F	A	%	Pts
Otahuhu Leopards	10	9	1	0	0	296	32	925%	19
Ellerslie Brothers	10	7	1	2	0	248	72	391.67%	15
Papatoetoe Panthers	10	7	1	2	0	248	110	225.45%	15
Marist Saints	10	6	1	3	0	266	100	266%	13
Mangere East Hawks	10	3	0	7	0	148	238	62.18%	6
Pakuranga Brothers	10	3	0	7	0	92	260	35.38%	6
Manurewa Marlins Elite	10	2	0	8	0	102	318	32.08%	4
Otara Red Scorpions	10	1	0	9	0	58	362	16.02%	2

Section 2

Team	Pld	W	D	L	B	F	A	%	Pts
Mount Albert Lions	9	8	0	1	1	282	54	522.22%	18
Otara Lil Giants	9	7	0	2	1	340	52	653.85%	16
Manurewa Black (Ngāruawāhia)	6	6	0	2	2	156	108	144.44%	16
Papakura Ravens	9	6	0	3	1	190	112	169.64%	14
New Lynn Stags Assazinz	9	2	0	7	1	100	270	37.04%	6
Glenora Brothaz	8	1	0	7	2	82	304	26.97%	4
Richmond Bulldogs	8	0	0	8	2	42	292	14.38%	4

==== Under 14 Girls ====
The Mangere East Hawks team, nicknamed the 'Elite Bella Hawks' won the grand final, defeating Richmond Rosebuds 28–0 at Mountfort Park in Manurewa. Mangere East finished the season undefeated winning all 12 of their matches. Papakura defaulted 2 matches, while Otara, Marist, Glenora, and Hibiscus Coast all defaulted one match. Manukau had 2 points deducted.

Team	Pld	W	D	L	B	F	A	%	Pts
Mangere East Elite Bella Hawks	10	10	0	0	0	502	14	3585.71%	20
Mt Albert Lions	10	9	1	0	0	328	72	455.56%	19
Manurewa Rewa Sisters	10	7	0	3	0	296	152	194.74%	14
Mangere East Hawks	10	6	0	4	0	216	132	163.64%	12
Manukau Magpies	9	6	0	3	0	280	98	285.71%	10
Hibiscus Coast Northland Raiders	10	5	0	5	0	216	182	118.68%	10
Manurewa Marlins	9	2	1	6	0	56	326	17.18%	5
Glenora Bears	10	1	2	7	0	90	222	40.54%	4
Marist Saints	10	1	1	8	0	88	380	23.16%	3
Papakura Sea Eagles	9	1	0	8	0	36	338	10.65%	2
Otara Girls Squad	9	0	0	9	0	36	434	8.29%	0

==== Under 13 Boys ====
The Under 13 competition was split into 2 sections containing 8 and 10 teams respectively. Mangere East Hawks won section 1, while Ellerslie Eagles won section 2. After the playoffs the two teams met in the final with Ellerslie winning by 22 points to 18 at Mt Smart #2. This was Mangere Easts first defeat of the season. The match was live streamed on the Auckland Rugby League YouTube channel. In section 1 Manurewa defaulted 1 match, while in section 2 Pakuranga defaulted a match.

Section 1

Team	Pld	W	D	L	B	F	A	%	Pts
Mangere East Commando Hawks	10	10	0	0	0	418	54	774.07%	20
Otahuhu Leopards Blue	9	7	0	2	1	296	74	400%	16
Mount Albert Lions	10	7	1	2	0	378	86	439.53%	15
Glenfield Greyhounds	10	7	1	2	0	318	134	237.31%	15
Otara Scorpion Braves	10	4	0	6	0	128	276	46.38%	8
Manurewa Soldiers	10	3	0	7	0	74	278	26.62%	6
Papakura Wekas	10	1	0	9	0	66	426	15.49%	2
Papatoetoe Pumas	10	0	0	10	0	100	386	25.91%	0

Section 2

Team	Pld	W	D	L	B	F	A	%	Pts
New Lynn Stags Wolfpack	9	9	0	0	0	374	58	644.83%	18
Ellerslie Easts Eagles	9	8	0	1	0	356	68	523.53%	16
Mangere East Blazers	10	8	0	2	0	318	188	169.15%	16
Otahuhu Otablu	9	5	0	4	1	276	194	142.27%	12
Manurewa Rewa Hard	10	6	0	4	0	258	234	110.26%	12
Waitemata Seagulls	10	3	1	6	0	174	300	58%	7
Papatoetoe Panthers	10	3	0	7	0	170	248	68.55%	6
Bay Roskill Vikings	10	3	0	7	0	122	316	38.61%	6
Pt Chevalier Green	10	2	1	7	0	160	272	58.82%	5
Pakuranga Eastern United	9	0	0	9	0	20	350	5.71%	0

== Representative fixtures ==
=== Senior representative competitions ===
==== Sky Sport Men's Premiership ====
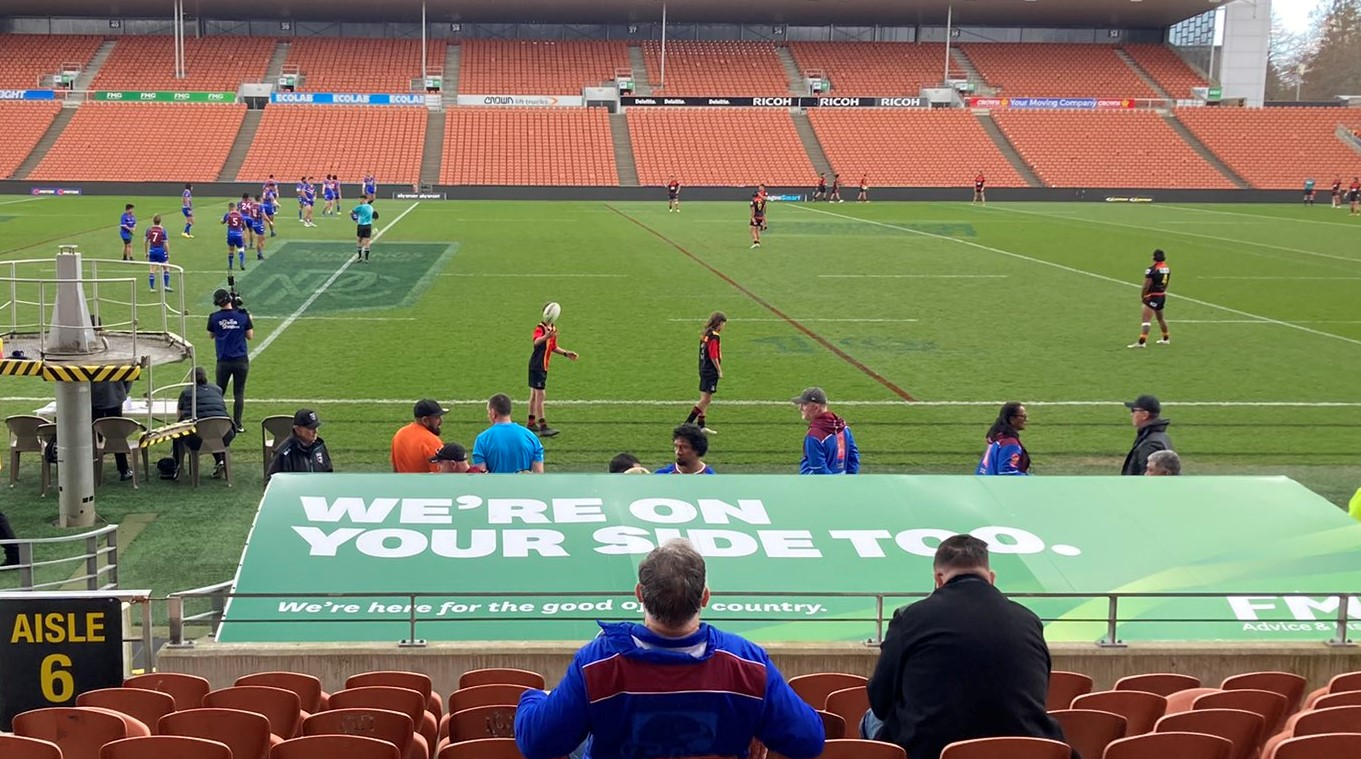
Akarana v Waikato at FMG Stadium in Hamilton on September 17

On September 10 the Men's Premiership began. It featured 4 teams with two of them representing the Tāmaki Makaurau region. Akarana Falcons represented the north, west, and central clubs and were coached by Phil Gordon who was the head coach of the Te Atatu Roosters and had held the position for a few seasons. While Counties Manukau Stingrays represented the east and south clubs and were coached by Brian (Tusa) Lafaele, the Otahuhu Leopards head coach, and Leroy Faavesi as the assistant coach. Marrin Haggie was the head coach of the Waikato Mana.

===== Table and results =====
Team	Pld	W	D	L	F	A	Diff	Pts
Akarana Falcons	3	3	0	0	150	30	+120	6
Canterbury Bulls	3	2	0	1	80	80	0	4
Counties Manukau Stingrays	3	1	0	2	68	88	-20	2
Waikato Mana	3	0	0	3	48	148	-100	0

Round 1

10 September	Akarana	32-12	Counties Manukau	Mt Smart Stadium 2
1:00	Try: Ollie Tuimavave (6m), Eiden Ackland (10m), Brody Tamarua (13m), Chaz Brown 2 (28m, 68m), Nicholas Halalilo (42m); Con: Francis Leger 4/6 (7m, 14m, 43m, 69m)		Try: Mavae Manukia 2 (25m, 75m), Anthony Fuimaono (26m), Alan Niulevu (60m); Con: Lorenzo Filimaua 2/4 (35m, 61m)	Attendance: 200

11 September	Canterbury	42-12	Waikato	Ngā Puna Wai Sports Hub, Christchurch
12:00	Try: Daniel Hartley 2 (5m, 78m), Reuben Te Amo (35m), Devaun Thompson (50m), Joshua Ifopo-Afamasaga (60m), Eti Collins (71m), D Samuela-Latu (75m); Con: Daniel Hartley 7/7 (6m, 37m, 51m, 61m, 72m, 76m, 79m)		Try: Mahinga Rangi 2 (18m, 23m); Con: Caleb McLean 2/2 (19m, 24m)	Attendance: 200

Round 2 Macgraff Leuluai made his first appearance for Counties-Manukau in their match with Canterbury. He had returned to New Zealand in 2021 and played for the Otara Scorpions for the past 2 years. Canterbury proved too strong to secure a vital win which put them in position to make the final.

17 September	Waikato	6-68	Akarana	FMG Stadium Waikato, Hamilton
1:00	Try: Aholelei Ofa Katoa (35m); Con: Rex Sullivan 1/1 (36m)		Try: Jeremiah Poutu 3 (5m, 51m, 72m), Brody Tamarua (9m), Cortez Taulu (14m), Harley Maynard (22m), Solomon Vasuvulagi 3 (26m, 30m, 44m) Matthew Whyte (39m), Nicholas Halalilo (60m), Zensei Inu (66m); Con: Brody Tamarua 10/12 (10m, 15m, 23m, 27m, 31m, 40m, 45m, 53m, 61m, 67m)	Attendance: 400; Referee: Viggo Rasmussen

18 September	Canterbury	26-18	Counties Manukau	Nga Puna Wai, Christchurch
12:05	Try: Penetito Ilalio 2 (10m, 58m), Etilani Pouli (29m), Erwin Sauni 2 (67m, 79m); Con: Daniel Hartley 3/5 (12m, 30m, 59m)		Try: Klayton Waikato (19m), Fiohiva Faingaa (32m), Jerome Mika (52m), Uila Aiolupo (76m); Con: Lorenzo Filimaua 0/3, William Stowers 1/1 (76m)	Referee: Paripari Parkinson

Round 3

24 September	Waikato	30-38	Counties Manukau	FMG Stadium Waikato, Hamilton
1:05	Try: Hemopo Te Koi (13m), Aholelei Ofa Katoa (34m), Taylor Lee (43m), Mahuta Ngataki Matthews (73m), Jordan Grace (76m); Con: R Punga-Sullivan 5/5 (14m, 35m, 44m, 74m, 78m)		Try: Mavae Manukia 2 (3m, 27m), Penehuro Toai (8m), Manu Fatialofa (40m), Klayton Waikato 2 (56m, 66m), William Stowers (69m); Con: William Stowers 5/7 (9m, 28m, 57m, 67m, 70m)

25 September	Canterbury	12-50	Akarana	Ngā Puna Wai Sports Hub, Christchurch
12:05	Try: Danny Samuelu-Latu (17m), Phil Nati (31m); Con: Taniela Leka 2/2 (18m, 32m)		Try: Joseph Price (10m), Shaun Tempest (24m), Solomon Vasuvulagi 2 (49m, 61m), James Gavet (53m), Nicholas Halililo (56m), James Taumata 2 (66m, 77m), Chaz Brown (74m); Con: Francis Leger 7/9 (11m, 25m, 50m, 54m, 62m, 75m, 78m)

===== Grand final =====
1 October	Akarana	46-4	Canterbury	North Harbour Stadium, Albany
2:30	Try: Brody Tamarua (13m), J Poutu 3 (24, 31m, 34m), Joseph Price (38m), Francis Leger 2 (47m, 79m), Blade Collins-Kamuhemu (61m), Chaz Brown (68m), James Taumata (75m); Con: Francis Leger 2/4 (14m, 33m), Eiden Ackland 0/2, K Ioka 1/2 (62m), Chaz Brown 0/1, James Gavet 0/1		Try: E Collins (57m); Con: Daniel Hartley 0/1

===== Akarana Falcons records =====
No	Name	Club	Play	Tries	Con	Pen	Points
1	Francis Leger	Pt Chevalier	4	4	13	0	42
2	Brody Tamarua	Pt Chevalier	4	3	10	0	32
3	Jeremiah Poutu	Richmond	3	6	0	0	24
4	Solomon Vasuvulagi	Glenora	4	5	0	0	20
5	Chaz Brown	Glenora	3	4	0	0	16
5	James Taumata	Glenora	2	4	0	0	16
7	Nicholas Halalilo	Richmond	4	3	0	0	12
8	Joseph Price	Te Atatu	4	2	0	0	8
9	Ollie Tuimavave	Pt Chevalier	1	1	0	0	4
9	Eiden Ackland	Mt Albert	3	1	0	0	4
9	Matthew Whyte	Pt Chevalier	3	1	0	0	4
9	Blade Collins-Kamuhemu	Richmond	4	1	0	0	4
9	Zenzei Inu	Pt Chevalier	3	1	0	0	4
9	James Gavet	Richmond	4	1	0	0	4
9	Harley Maynard	Pt Chevalier	3	1	0	0	4
9	Cortez Taulu	Te Atatu	1	1	0	0	4
9	Shaun Tempest	Bay Roskill	2	1	0	0	4
18	Kadiyae Elliott Ioka	Glenora	3	0	1	0	2
19	Esom Ioka	Glenora	4	0	0	0	0
19	Sioeli Makaui	Pt Chevalier	3	0	0	0	0
19	Lewis Soosemea	Pt Chevalier	2	0	0	0	0
19	Paterika Vaivai	Te Atatu	2	0	0	0	0
19	M Oge	Bay Roskill	1	0	0	0	0
19	Tuteauru Maipi	Te Atatu	1	0	0	0	0

===== Counties Manukau records =====
No	Name	Club	Play	Tries	Con	Pen	Points
1	William Stowers	Otahuhu	3	1	6	0	16
1	Mavae Manuika	Otahuhu	3	4	0	0	16
3	Klayton Waikato	Howick	3	3	0	0	12
4	Lorenzo Filimaua	Otahuhu	3	2	0	0	8
5	Anthony Fuimoana	Howick	3	1	0	0	4
5	Fioheva Siale Faingaa	Otahuhu	2	1	0	0	4
5	Alan Niulevu	Howick	2	1	0	0	4
5	Manu Fatialofa	Otara	3	1	0	0	4
5	Penehuro Toai	Otahuhu	2	1	0	0	4
5	Uila Aiolupo	Howick	3	1	0	0	4
5	Jerome Mika	Howick	1	1	0	0	4
12	Sione Tesese	Otahuhu	3	0	0	0	0
12	Desmond Toofohe	Manukau	3	0	0	0	0
12	Jacob Tialavea Leniu Paulo	Otahuhu	3	0	0	0	0
12	Sione Fe'ao	Otahuhu	3	0	0	0	0
12	Tayhler Paora	Howick	2	0	0	0	0
12	Tahi Baggaley	Howick	2	0	0	0	0
12	Phoenix Hunt	Otahuhu	2	0	0	0	0
12	Macgraff Leuluai	Otara	2	0	0	0	0
12	Brandon Lee	Howick	2	0	0	0	0
12	Fangupo Fotu	Otahuhu	1	0	0	0	0

==== Sky Sport Women's Premiership ====
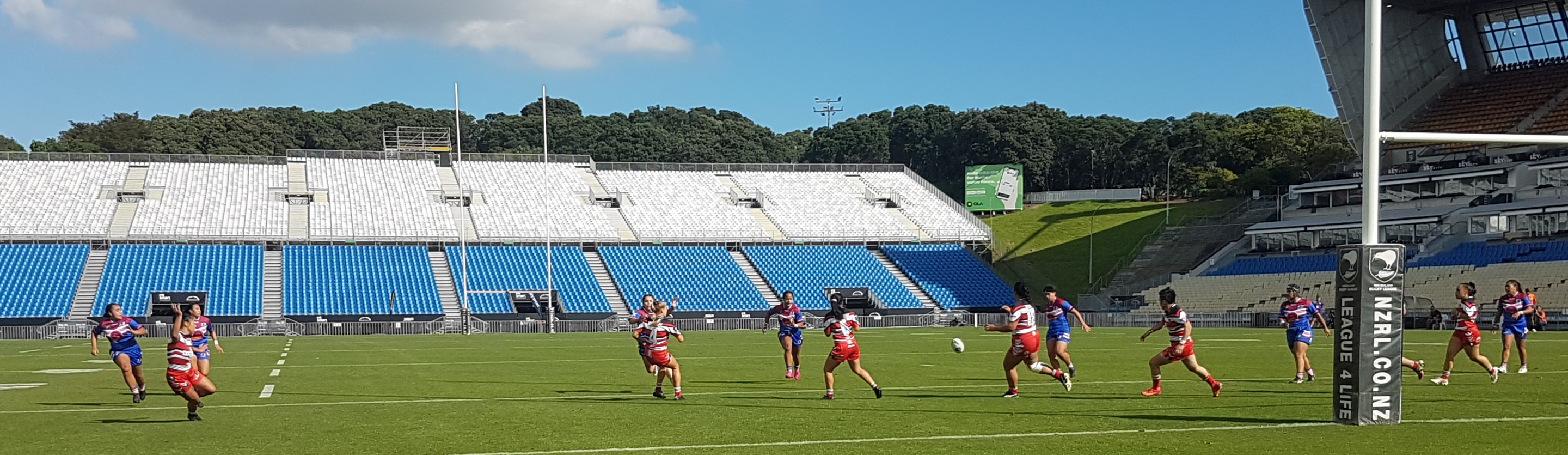
Tournament MVP Laishon Albert-Jones of Akarana kicking through the defensive line in the grand final at Mt Smart Stadium. Akarana won 24–12.

The Sky Sport Women's Premiership was played over 4 weeks in March and April. It featured 4 teams, including 2 from Auckland. These were the Akarana Falcons W and Counties-Manukau Stingrays W. The other teams from around New Zealand were Mid Central Vipers W (Taranaki, Manawatu, with added players from Wellington), and Canterbury W. The Akarana Falcons W were coached by Steve Buckingham, and Counties-Manukau Stingrays by Greg Selwyn, with James Sarah the assistant coach. The competition was scheduled at the same time as the NRLW competition for players who were unable to relocate to Australia due the covid travel restrictions. All matches were broadcast live on Sky Sports and were also uploaded to the YouTube site (links in references within the game details). The main commentator was Lavina Good with various co-commentators such as former Kiwi Fern Juliana Newman. Akarana Falcons won the competition, defeating Counties-Manukau Stingrays in the final 24–12 at Mount Smart Stadium on April 16. It was their first title in 11 efforts. The following are the fixtures that the 2 Auckland based teams were involved in.

===== Table and results =====
Team	Pld	W	D	L	F	A	Diff	Pts
Counties Manukau Stingrays	3	3	0	0	100	42	+58	6
Akarana Falcons	3	2	0	1	86	56	+30	4
Canterbury	3	1	0	2	46	86	-40	2
Mid Central Vipers	3	0	0	3	38	86	-48	0

Round 1

26 March	Counties-Manukau W	46-10	Canterbury W	Waitakere Stadium, Auckland
2:00	Try: Kere Matua 2, Amber Kani, Annessa Biddle, Alexandrea Kiriwi, Kelly-Marie Alexander, Makayla Eli 3 Con: Kere Matua (2/3), Jonsal Tautari (2/3), Makayla Eli (1/3)		Try: Gloria Su'a, Cassie Siataga; Con: Cassie Siataga (1/2)	Referee: David Miller

27 March	Akarana W	36-16	Mid Central W	Waitakere Stadium, Auckland
12:00	Try: Tatiana Finau, Rowena Maleisea, Kaiyah Atai, Capri Paekau, Mela Vili, Clementine Varea, Lavinia Tauhalaliku; Con: Laishon Albert-Jones (0/2), Tatiana Finau (4/5)		Try: Aggy Faraimo, Sarahcen Oliver 2 Con: Tawny Burgess (2/2), Kaitlyn Bates (0/1)	Referee: Keven Ah Ken

Round 2 Greg Selwyn, the Counties-Manukau coach was overseas so James Sarah, the assistant coach took head coaching duties in his absence.

2 April	Counties-Manukau W	28-10	Mid-Central W	Bruce Pulman Park, Auckland
2:30	Try: Alix Leaupepe, Annessa Biddle, Halyana Finau, Pahu Kani, Kelly-Marie Alexander; Con: Kere Matua (1/1), Makayla Eli (2/3), Jonsal Tautari (1/1)		Try: Odelle Edmonds, Agnes Faraimo; Con: Kaitlyn Bates (1/2)	Referee: Rochelle Tamarua

3 April	Canterbury W	14-28	Akarana W	Ngā Puna Wai Sports Hub, Christchurch
2:00	Try: Mikayla Werahiko 2, Sailiai Pau; Con: Dayna Napa (1/3)		Try: Roimata Amosa-Tiro, Roelien Du Plessis 2, Laishon Albert-Jones, Lavinia Tauhalaliku, Keri Ratima; Con: Laishon Albert-Jones (2/7)	Referee: Gary Smallridge

Round 3

9 April	Counties-Manukau W	26-22	Akarana W	Bruce Pulman Park, Auckland
10:30	Try: Abigail Roache 2, Teuila Fotu-Moala, Gloria Murray-Fiu, Kelly-Marie Alexander; Con: Makayla Eli (3/5)		Try: Laishon Albert-Jones 2, Lavinia Tauhalaliku, Kanyon Paul; Con: Laishon Albert-Jones (0/1), Tatiana Finau (3/3)	Referee: David Miller

===== Grand final =====
16 April	Akarana W	24-12	Counties-Manukau W	Mt Smart
2:10	Try: Harata Butler, Kaiya Atai, Tatiana Finau, Rowena Meleisea, Capri Paekau; Con: Tatiana Finau (2/5)		Try: Abigail Roache, Pahu Kani, Alexandrea Kiriwi; Con: Mikayla Eli (0/3)	Attendance: 500; Referee: Rochelle Tamarua

===== Tournament Team =====
Prior to the grand final the following Auckland players were named in the tournament team: Lavinia Tauhalalaiku, Tatiana Finau, Laishon Albert-Jones, Capri Paeku, and Kahu Cassidy from the Akarana Falcons, and Makayla Eli, Cassie Siataga, Teuila Fotu Moala, Annessa Biddle, and Christyl Stowers from the Counties-Manukau Stingrays side. Laishon Albert-Jones was named the tournament MVP.

===== Akarana Falcons W records =====
No	Name	Club Team	Played	Tries	Con	Pen	Points
1	Tatiana Finau	Pt Chevalier	3	2	9	0	26
2	Laishon Albert-Jones	Richmond	4	3	2	0	16
3	Lavinia Tauhalaliku	Pt Chevalier	4	2	0	0	8
3	Roelien Du-Plessis	Richmond	4	2	0	0	8
5	Rowena Maleisea	Richmond	3	2	0	0	8
5	Kaiyah Atai	Richmond	4	2	0	0	8
5	Capri Paekau	Pt Chevalier	4	2	0	0	8
5	Mela Vili	Richmond	4	1	0	0	4
5	Clementine Varea	Glenora	4	1	0	0	4
5	Roimata Amosa-Tiro	Marist	4	1	0	0	4
5	Keri Ratima	Richmond	4	1	0	0	4
5	Kanyon Paul	Richmond	3	1	0	0	4
5	Charlette Harata-Butler	Taniwharau	3	1	0	0	4
14	Kahurina Cassidy	Richmond	4	0	0	0	0
14	Nancy Sikei	Pt Chevalier	3	0	0	0	0
14	Pamela McHardy	Pt Chevalier	3	0	0	0	0
14	Jenna Mamea	Pt Chevalier	3	0	0	0	0
14	Avery-Rose Carmont	Marist	2	0	0	0	0
14	Melania Cairns	Ponsonby	2	0	0	0	0
14	Greig	?	1	0	0	0	0
14	Phillipa Smith	Glenora	1	0	0	0	0
14	Joana Drawe Waqa	Glenora	1	0	0	0	0

===== Counties-Manukau W records =====
No	Name	Club Team	Played	Tries	Con	Pen	Points
1	Makayla Eli	Manurewa	4	3	6	0	24
2	Kere Matua	Manurewa	4	2	3	0	14
3	Kelly-Marie Alexander	Howick	4	3	0	0	12
3	Abigail Roache	Howick	4	3	0	0	12
5	Annessa Biddle	Pakuranga	3	2	0	0	8
5	Alexandrea Kiriwi	Manurewa	3	2	0	0	8
5	Pahu Kani	Manurewa	4	2	0	0	8
8	Jonsal Tautari	Manurewa	4	0	3	0	6
9	Halayna Finau	Manurewa	4	1	0	0	4
9	Gloria Murray-Finau	Manurewa	4	1	0	0	4
9	Alix Leaupepe	Manurewa	3	1	0	0	4
9	Teuila Fotu-Moala	Manurewa	2	1	0	0	4
9	Amber Kani	Manurewa	2	1	0	0	4
14	Zayde Sarah-Baldwin	Howick	4	0	0	0	0
14	Kelly Maipi	Manurewa	4	0	0	0	0
14	Christyl Stowers	Manurewa	3	0	0	0	0
14	Charlotte Davis	Howick	3	0	0	0	0
14	Karley Te Kawa	Manurewa	3	0	0	0	0
14	Tainui (Geneva) Webber	Manurewa	3	0	0	0	0
14	Elisapeta Gale	Howick	2	0	0	0	0
14	Melvina Weilert	Howick	1	0	0	0	0
14	Alexis Hapuku	Manurewa	1	0	0	0	0

==== National Men's Championship ====
The National Championship competition was a second-tier competition below the premiership. The winner of it would qualify to gain promotion to the Premiership for 2023. Auckland competed in it despite already having the Akarana Falcons and the Counties Manukau Stingrays already representing the area in the Premiership. The Auckland Vulcans is a side which represents the entire Auckland region but is selected after the Vulcans and Stingrays sides have been chosen and is for all intents and purposes a 'C' team. Nevertheless, due to the strength and depth of the Auckland competition they won the Championship comfortably and were promoted to join the Falcons and Stingrays in the premiership in 2023. They scored a total of 168 points across 4 games and conceded only 38, winning the final against Otago by 48 points to 12 at North Harbour Stadium in Albany on October 3.

===== North Island Championship standings =====
Team	Pld	W	D	L	F	A	Pts
Auckland Vulcans	3	3	0	0	124	26	6
Upper Central Stallions	3	1	0	2	58	70	2
Mid Central Vipers	3	1	0	2	60	88	2
Wellington Orcas	3	1	0	2	40	98	2

===== South Island Championship =====
Team	Pld	W	D	L	F	A	Pts
Otago Whalers	3	3	0	0	129	60	6
Southland Rams	3	2	0	1	94	104	4
West Coast Chargers	3	1	0	2	84	61	2
Aoraki	3	0	0	3	64	146	0

===== North Island Championship results =====
	Date		Score		Score	Venue
Round 1	17 September	Auckland	40	Wellington	0	Rotorua Stadium #3, 11:15pm
Round 1	17 September	Mid Central	24	Upper Central	10	Rotorua Stadium #4, 11:15pm
Round 2	17 September	Wellington	36	Mid Central	24	Rotorua Stadium #3, 1:45pm
Round 2	17 September	Auckland	42	Mid Central	12	Rotorua Stadium #4, 1:45pm
Round 3	18 September	Auckland	42	Mid Central	12	Rotorua Stadium #3, 12:15pm
Round 3	18 September	Upper Central	34	Wellington	4	Rotorua Stadium #4, 12:45pm

===== New Zealand Championship final =====
3 October	Auckland Vulcans	48-12	Otago	North Harbour Stadium, Albany
3:00	Try: Dylan Tavita 2, Siapo Pasene 2, Mose Esera 2, Tevin Arona, James Waterson, Mike Williams; Con: Tevin Arona 6/9		Try: Cameron Brown, Samuel Wyber; Con: Haugh 2/2	Referee: Jack Feavers, Joseph Green (TJ), Anthony Elliott (TJ)

=== Junior representative competitions ===
==== Ruben Wiki Cup (U20) ====
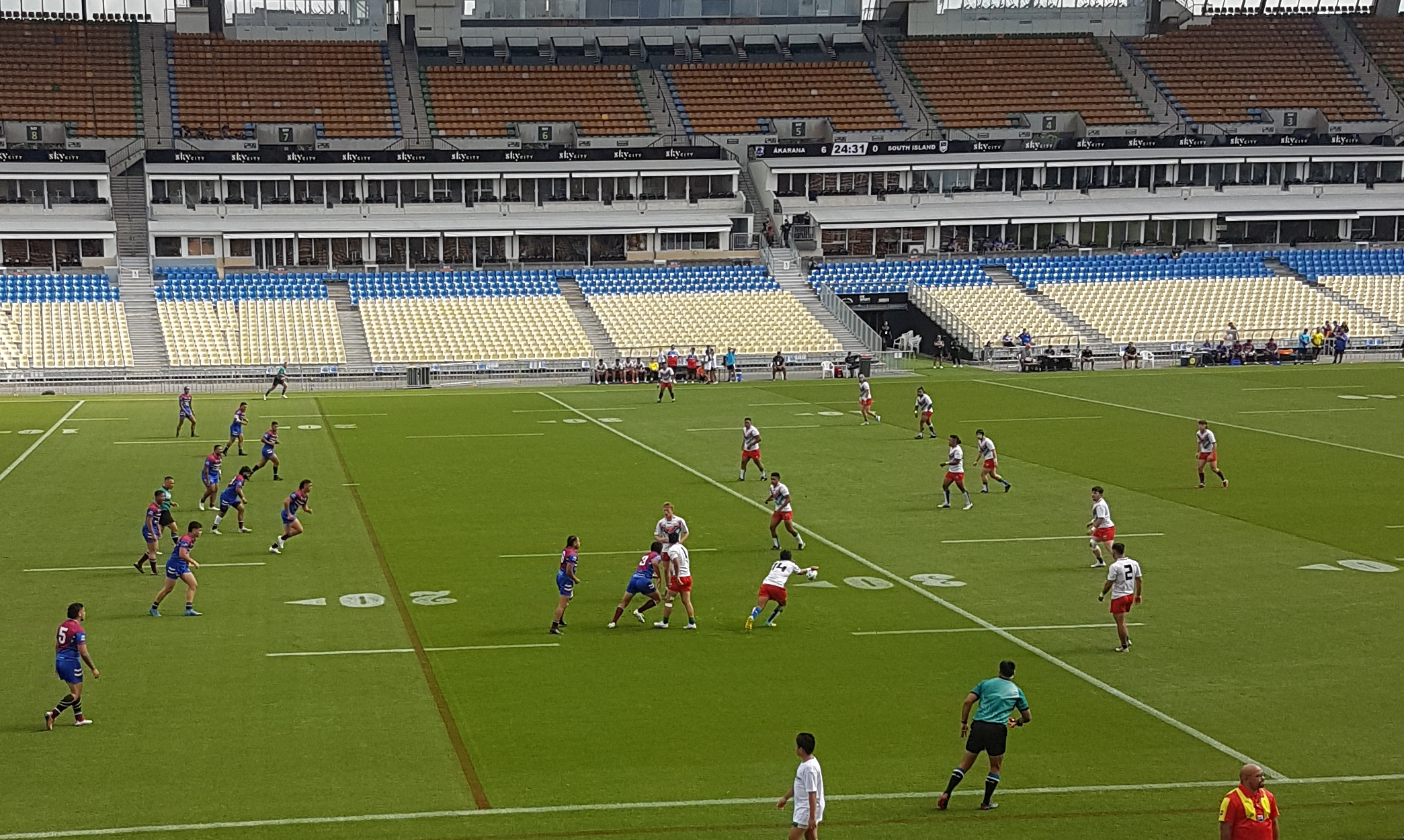
Akarana Falcons (U20) v South Island (U20) in the grand final

The Ruben Wiki Cup was played for by Akarana Falcons (North Shore and West Auckland), and Counties-Manukau Stingrays (East Auckland and South Auckland) from the Auckland region. The cup is named after former New Zealand rugby league player Ruben Wiki. He also played for the Otahuhu Leopards as a junior and played for the New Zealand Warriors. This was the second year that the competition had been run, though in its inaugural season of 2021 the teams representing the Auckland region were Auckland White and Auckland Blue. Akarana were coached by Henri Nicholas, while Counties Manukau were coached by Gary Kingi and Sean Witanga. The other teams competing were South Island Scorpions, Upper Central Vipers, and Waikato Mana. Akarana advanced to the final where they met the South Island and ran out convincing winners 34–16 at Mount Smart Stadium on April 16.

===== Ruben Wiki Cup table and fixtures =====
Team	Pld	W	D	L	F	A	Diff	Pts
Akarana Falcons	4	3	1	0	162	60	+102	7
South Island Scorpions	4	3	0	1	128	58	+70	6
Counties Manukau Stingrays	4	2	1	1	166	60	+106	5
Upper Central Stallions	4	1	0	3	66	188	-122	2
Waikato Mana	4	0	0	4	40	196	-156	0

Fixtures only involving the Auckland representative teams (Akarana Falcons and Counties-Manukau Stingrays).

Round 1

12 March	South Island	20–24	Akarana	Ngā Puna Wai Sports Hub, Christchurch
2:00	Try: Tupou Kaufononga, Makaia Tafua, Ethan Faitaua, Kiardyn Hatch; Con: Jacob Lowe (2/4)		Try: Tupala Fa-aee 2, Esom Ioka, Sebastian Su’a, Lani Graham-Taufa; Con: Tupala Fa’aee (1/3), Joshua Tanielu (1/2)	Referee: Jack Feavers

Round 2

19 March	Akarana	26–26	Counties-Manukau	Trusts Stadium, Henderson
2:00	Try: Maddison Tekeu, Sebastian Hindt, Waikare Ratima, Doux Fiatau-Kauhiva, Kenneth-Seth Henry-Taua, Paaua Papuni-Abbott; Con: Tuipala Fa’aee 3		Try: Pesalili Ma, Teariki Ford, Samuel Hansen; Con: Teariki Ford 4 Pen: Teariki Ford	Referee: Paki Parkinson

Round 3

26 March	Counties-Manukau	56–6	Upper Central	Trusts Stadium, Henderson
2:00	Try: Jarney Proctor, Tearirki Ford, Lelefu Sang-Yum, Maddison Tekeu, Zedric Timai, Pesalili Ma, 3, Heneli Luani, Timothy Tiatia; Con: Teariki Ford (5/7), Lelefu Sang-Yun (2/2), Anthony Naitoko (1/1)		Try: Rawhiri Matthew; Con: Xavier Mitchell-Winsor (1/1)	Referee: Rochelle Tamarua

Round 4

2 April	Akarana	36–14	Waikato	Bruce Pulman Park, Papakura
12:30	Try: Tuipala Fa’aee, Esom Ioka, Joshua Tanielu, Tyson Davies, Elam Payne, Kenneth-Seth Henry-Taua, Doux Fiatau-Kauhiva; Con: Tuipala Fa’aee (4/6), Doux Fiatau-Kauhiva (1/1)		Try: Western Tahuri, Noah Wood 2 Con: Jardyn Stilinovich-Watene (1/3)	Referee: Darryn Hopewell

2 April	South Island	24–12	Counties-Manukau	Ngā Puna Wai Sports Hub, Christchurch
4pm	Try: Jacob Lowe, Taani Fangupo, Makaia Tafua, Tupou Kaufononga, Vaione Siaki; Con: Matariri Halbert-Pere (2/5)		Try: Timothy Tiatia, Samuel Hansen 2 Con: Timothy Tiatia (0/3)	Referee: Paki Parkinson

Round 5

9 April	Counties-Manukau	72–4	Waikato	Bruce Pulman Park, Papakura
	Try: Ben Peni 2, Stanley Hingano, Zedric Timai 2, Jarney Proctor-Harwood, Pesalili Ma, Teariki Ford, Tyson Lelefu Sang-Yum, Jacob Hollobon, Franck Baniani Temanu, Anthony Naitoko; Con: Teariki Ford (12/12)		Try: Ramsey Finau; Con: Daniela (0/1)	Referee: Viggo Rasmussen

9 April	Akarana	76–0	Upper Central	Davies Park, Huntly
12:30	Try: Elam Payne, Louise Dehar Webster 2, Joshua Tanielu 2, Esom Ioka, Robert Davis 2, Doux Fiatau-Kauhiva 2, Seeti Kuresa-Tovao, Waikere Ratima, Sebastian Su’a, Tyson Davies; Con: Tuipala Fa'aee (10/12), Esom Ioka (0/1), Joshua Tanielu (0/1)			Referee: Joseph Green

===== Grand final =====
Akarana won the grand final 34 points to 16 after taking a 22–6 lead into halftime. The MVP of the final was Esom Ioka who scored a try in each half.

16 April	Akarana	34-16	South Island	Mt Smart Stadium
12:10	Try: Sebastian Su'a, Josh Tanielu 2, Esom Ioka 2, Faith Kalekale; Con: Tuipala Fa'aee (3/4), Josh Tanielu (1/1); Pen: Josh Tanielu (1/1)		Try: Makaia Tafua, Kiardyn Hatch, Mato Halbert-Pere; Con: Mato Halbert-Pere (2/3)	Attendance: 500; Referee: Paki Parkinson

===== Tournament team =====
Prior to the grand final the 2022 NZRL National U20s tournament team was named and included the following Auckland players; Josh Tanielu, Esom Ioka, Doux Fiatau Kauhiva, Jonpaul White, Elam Payne, Paaua Papuni-Abbott, and Sebastian Su'a from the Akarana side, and Tyson Sang-Yum, and Teariki Ford from the Counties-Manukau side. Doux Fiatau Kauhiva was named the tournament MVP.

===== Akarana Falcons U20 records =====
No	Name	Club	Play	Tries	Con	Pen	Points
1	Tuipala Fa'aee	Richmond	5	3	20	0	52
2	Joshua Tanielu	Bay Roskill	5	5	2	1	26
3	Esom Ioka	Glenora	5	5	0	0	20
4	Doux Fiatau-Kauhiva	Marist	5	4	1	0	18
5	Sebastian Su'a	Mt Albert	5	3	0	0	12
6	Waikare Ratima	Richmond	4	2	0	0	8
6	Kenneth-Seth Henry-Taua	Waitemata	5	2	0	0	8
6	Tyson Davies	Te Atatu	5	2	0	0	8
6	Elam Payne	Marist	5	2	0	0	8
6	Louis Dehar Webster	Marist	3	2	0	0	8
6	Robert Davis	Richmond	4	2	0	0	8
12	Lani Graham-Taufa	Marist	2	1	0	0	4
12	Sebastian Hindt	Bay Roskill	3	1	0	0	4
12	Paaua Papuni-Abbott	Mt Albert	5	1	0	0	4
12	Seeti Kuresa-Tovao	Marist	2	1	0	0	4
12	Faith Kalekale	Mt Albert	2	1	0	0	4
17	Jonpaul White	Marist	5	0	0	0	0
17	Marcus Nicholas	Richmond	3	0	0	0	0
17	Kyan Alo	Richmond	2	0	0	0	0
17	Khalan Clyde	Te Atatu	2	0	0	0	0
17	Daniel Smith	Pt Chevalier	2	0	0	0	0
17	Ethan Moughan	Marist	2	0	0	0	0
17	Ioane Iosua	Richmond	2	0	0	0	0
17	Nathaniel Cama	Waitemata	1	0	0	0	0
17	Jacob Rutherford	Te Atatu	1	0	0	0	0

===== Counties Manukau Stingrays U20 records =====
No	Name	Club	Play	Tries	Con	Pen	Points
1	Teariki Ford	Mangere East	4	3	21	1	56
2	Pesalili Ma	Otahuhu	3	5	0	0	20
3	Samuel Hansen	Otahuhu	3	3	0	0	12
4	Tyson Lelefu Sang-Yum	Otahuhu	4	2	2	0	12
5	Zedric Timai	Manurewa	3	3	0	0	12
6	Maddison-Isaiah Tekeu	Otahuhu	3	2	0	0	8
6	Jarney Proctor-Harwood	Manurewa	4	2	0	0	8
6	Timothy Tiatia	Manurewa	2	2	0	0	8
6	Ben Peni	Otahuhu	3	2	0	0	8
10	Anthony Naitoko	Otahuhu	3	1	1	0	6
10	Heneli Luani	Pakuranga	2	1	0	0	4
10	Stanley Vaea-Hingano	Pakuranga	2	1	0	0	4
10	Jacob Hollobon	Howick	4	1	0	0	4
10	Franck Baniani Temanu	?	4	1	0	0	4
12	Taylor Papali'i	Otara	4	0	0	0	0
12	Metanoea Saulala	Otahuhu	3	0	0	0	0
12	Carlos Tarawhiti	Pakuranga	3	0	0	0	0
12	Titanian Palei	Pakuranga	2	0	0	0	0
12	Reno Wright	Manurewa	2	0	0	0	0
12	Niualinghi Peni	Otahuhu	2	0	0	0	0
12	Jacob Leung-Wai	Otara	2	0	0	0	0
12	Jeremiah Tamatinu	Manurewa	2	0	0	0	0
12	Harlem Te Namu	Otahuhu	2	0	0	0	0
12	Ezekial Start	Otahuhu	1	0	0	0	0
12	Ariki Honetana-Pani	Manurewa	1	0	0	0	0

==== Dean Bell Cup (U18) ====
The 2022 season was the first year that the Dean Bell Cup had been competed for. It “was run by the Auckland Rugby League with support from the Sky Sport Future Warriors Academy and the New Zealand Rugby League”. The trophy is named after Dean Bell who represented the Manukau Magpies club, along with Auckland, and New Zealand from 1983 to 1989 in 26 matches. The competing teams from Auckland were Tāmaki ki to Raki (North) coached by Bevan Thomas, Tamaki ki te Rawhiti (East) coached by Philip Watson, Tāmaki ki te Tonga (South) coached by Louis Papali’i, and Tāmaki ki te Uru (West) coached by Steven Hatch.

===== Dean Bell Cup table and fixtures =====
Team	Pld	W	D	L	F	A	Pts
Tāmaki ki te Uru (West)	2	2	0	0	90	20	4
Tāmaki ki te Raki (North)	2	2	0	0	66	8	4
Tāmaki ki te Rawhiti (East)	2	1	0	1	66	36	2
Tāmaki ki te Tonga (South)	2	1	0	1	64	48	2
Northland Swords	2	0	0	2	4	92	0
Waikato Mana	2	0	0	2	14	106	0

	Date		Score		Score	Venue
Round 1	12 March	Waikato	10	Tāmaki ki te Uru (West)	52	Davies Park, Huntly, 12:00pm
Round 1	13 March	Northland	0	Tāmaki ki te Rawhiti (East)	62	Semenoff Stadium, Whangārei, 2:00pm
Round 2	19 March	Waikato	4	Tāmaki ki te Tonga (South)	54	Ngaruawahia
Round 2	20 March	Northland	4	Tāmaki ki te Raki (North)	30	Semenoff Stadium, Whangārei
Round 3	26 March	Tāmaki ki te Raki (North)	36	Tāmaki ki te Rawhiti (East)	4	Cornwall Park, 12pm
Round 3	27 March	Tāmaki ki te Tonga (South)	10	Tāmaki ki te Uru (West)	38	Cornwall Park, 12pm
3rd/4th placement game	3 April	Tāmaki ki te Tonga (South)	40	Tāmaki ki te Rawhiti (East)	16	Cornwall Park, 2:00pm
5th/6th placement game	3 April	Waikato Mana	22	Northern Swords	16	Cornwall Park, 10:00am

===== Grand final =====
The match was live streamed on Sky Sport Next and on YouTube with Dale Husband, Viggo Rasmussen, and Wade Brunsdon commentating.

2 April	Tāmaki ki te Uru (West)	46–12	Tāmaki ki te Raki (North)	Mount Smart Stadium #1
1:00	Try: Xaview Tito-Harris 2, Shaye Faa’Aoga, Selumiela Halasima 2, Jacob David Auloa, Nate Brown, Sio Kali; Con: Selumiela Halasima 4, Shaye Faa'Aoga 2 Pen: Selumiela Halasima		Try: Axel-Ray Fine-Sietu, William Piliu; Con: William Piliu 2

===== Tournament team =====
Following the grand final an Invitational Junior Warriors U18 touring squad was named to prepare for a three match upper North Island tour during the Term 1 school holidays. The squad was initially 27 players strong but was trimmed down to 23 before the tour. The 27 player squad was AJ Sea (Manurewa Marlins), Allan Talataina (Pt Chevalier), Alvin Chong-Nee (Manurewa), Ben Peni (Otahuhu), Dennis Sofara (Pt Chevalier), Devonte Mihinui (Te Atatū), Denzal Hurt-Pickering (Mt Albert), Elijah Salesa-Leaumoana (Otahuhu), Elijah Rasmussen (Pt Chevalier), Epafasi Fehoko (Manurewa), Francis Tuimauga (Mangere East), Jacob David Auloa (Pt Chevalier), Jarome Falemoe (Manurewa), Jeremiah Cullen (Manurewa), Jeriko Filipi-Talisau (Manurewa), Kayliss Fatialofa (Manurewa), Selumiela Halasima (Pt Chevalier), Ratu Naborisi (Pt Chevalier), Raphael Sio (Pt Chevalier), Regan Brown (New Lynn), Rhys Wikitera-Mataio (Mt Albert), Rodney Vea (Manurewa), Shaye Faa’Aoga (Pt Chevalier), Sio Kali (Pt Chevalier), Siale Mafi Moui Foou Siulangapo (Manurewa), Timothy Tiatia (Manurewa), William Puliu (Mt Albert). Not available for selection: Xavier Harris-Tito (Pt Chevalier).

==== Shaun Johnson Shield (U16) ====
The 2022 season was the inaugural year for the Shaun Johnson Shield which is named after New Zealand international and long time New Zealand Warriors player Shaun Johnson. He was a Hibiscus Coast Raiders junior and also played rugby league for Orewa College. The four Auckland teams competing were Tāmaki ki to Raki (North Auckland) coached by Jason Williams, Tamaki ki te Rawhiti (East Auckland) coached by Terry Morrison, Tāmaki ki te Tonga (South Auckland) coached by Ruka Loza, and Tāmaki ki te Uru (West Auckland) coached by Fletcher Butler. The other competing teams were Waitako Mana and the Northern Swords.

===== Shaun Johnson Shield table and fixtures =====
Team	Pld	W	D	L	F	A	Pts
Tāmaki ki te Raki (North)	2	2	0	0	104	4	4
Tāmaki ki te Tonga (South)	2	2	0	0	64	36	4
Tāmaki ki te Uru (West)	2	1	0	1	48	44	2
Tāmaki ki te Rawhiti (East)	2	1	0	1	18	26	2
Waikato Mana	2	0	0	2	30	62	0
Northland Swords	2	0	0	2	4	96	0

	Date		Score		Score	Venue
Round 1	12 March	Waikato Mana	10	Tāmaki ki te Uru (West)	32	Davies Park, Huntly, 10:00am
Round 1	13 March	Northland Swords	4	Tāmaki ki te Rawhiti (East)	14	Semenoff Stadium, Whangārei, 12:00pm
Round 2	19 March	Waikato Mana	20	Tāmaki ki te Tonga (South)	30	Ngaruawahia
Round 2	20 March	Northland	0	Tāmaki ki te Raki (North)	30	Semenoff Stadium, Whangārei
Round 3	26 March	Tāmaki ki te Raki (North)	22	Tāmaki ki te East (East)	4	Cornwall Park, 10:00am
Round 3	27 March	Tāmaki ki te Tonga (South)	34	Tāmaki ki te Uru (West)	16	Cornwall Park, 10:00am
3rd/4th placement game	3 April	Tāmaki ki te Uru (West)	30	Tāmaki ki te Rawhiti (East)	10	Cornwall Park, 12:00pm
5th/6th placement game	3 April	Waikato Mana	48	Northern Swords	6	Cornwall Park, 10:00am

===== Grand Final =====
2 April	Tāmaki ki te Tonga (South)	20–12	Tāmaki ki te Raki (North)	Mount Smart Stadium #1
1:00	Try: Sosaia Latu, Haami Loza 2, Sale Tatupu, Edward Pirika		Try: Demetrius Kilisimasi, Atelea Filo; Con: Ryder Williams 2

===== Tournament team =====
At the conclusion of the competition the Auckland Under 16 representative team was named for a three-game tour of the upper North Island from April 21 to May 1. The team selected was Atapana Su'a (Marist), Atelea Filo (Mangere East), Augustino Filipo (Mangere East), Austin Marsters (Marist), Demetrius Kilisimasi (Marist), Dezman Laban (Glenora), Edward Pirika (Mangere East), EJ Mahu-Delamare (Mangere East), Haami Loza (Mangere East), Jarrel Vaega (Marist), Jeremiah Tatupu (Mangere East), Kaawyn Patterson (Westlake Boys), Lucky Kali (Pt Chevalier), Matiasi Lolesio (Otara), Noah Jensen (Richmond), Peter Kengike (Mt Albert), Rico Toeava-Ward (De La Salle), Sione Lisala (Mt Albert), Taipari Wikitera (Marist), Te Paeroa Wineera (Manurewa), Terence Ieriko (Richmond), Vitalano J Roache (Manurewa).
