= List of Samoa national rugby league team results =

The following list is a complete collection of results for the Samoa national rugby league team.

== Overall ==
Below is the table of the representative rugby matches played by Samoa at international level. As of 8 November 2026

Opponent	Played	Won	Drawn	Lost	% Won	Year/s
American Samoa	1	1	0	0	100%	1994
Australia	6	0	0	6	0%	2000–2026
Australian Aborigines	3	3	0	0	100%	1990–1994
Cook Islands	8	6	0	2	75%	1986–2022
England	7	1	0	6	14.29%	2006–2024
England Knights	1	0	0	1	0%	2013
Fiji	12	4	0	8	33.33%	1992–2019
France	6	5	0	1	80%	1995–2026
Greece	1	1	0	0	100%	2022
Ireland	2	0	0	2	0%	2000–2008
Lebanon	1	1	0	0	100%	2007
New Caledonia	1	1	0	0	100%	2004
New Zealand	7	0	0	7	0%	2010–2025
Māori	6	2	0	4	33%	1986–2004
Niue	3	3	0	0	100%	1990–2004
Papua New Guinea	4	4	0	0	100%	2009–2026
Rotuma	1	1	0	0	100%	1994
Scotland	2	1	1	0	50%	2000-2017
Tokelau	4	3	0	1	75%	1986–2006
Tonga	23	11	1	11	47.83%	1986–2026
United States	2	1	0	1	100%	2007–2014
Wales	1	0	0	1	0%	1995
Total	101	48	2	51	47.52%	1986–
Note: The list excludes a 2019 match against the Canterbury Bulls.

== Results ==
=== 1980s ===
Date	Home	Score	Away	Competition	Stadium	Crowd
27 October 1986	Western Samoa	34–12	Tokelau	1986 Pacific Cup	(Cook Islands) Avaru National Stadium, Rarotonga	Unknown
29 October 1986	Western Samoa	36–16	Tonga	1986 Pacific Cup	(Cook Islands) Avaru National Stadium, Rarotonga	Unknown
2 November 1986	Cook Islands	0–48	Western Samoa	1986 Pacific Cup	(Cook Islands) Avaru National Stadium, Rarotonga	Unknown
4 November 1986	Western Samoa	46–4	Tonga	1986 Pacific Cup	(Cook Islands) Avaru National Stadium, Rarotonga	Unknown
7 November 1986	New Zealand Māori	23–16	Western Samoa	1986 Pacific Cup	(Cook Islands) Avaru National Stadium, Rarotonga	Unknown
22 October 1988	Western Samoa	52–16	Cook Islands	1988 Pacific Cup	(Samoa) Apia Park, Apia	Unknown
24 October 1988	Western Samoa	48–18	Tokelau	1988 Pacific Cup	(Samoa) Apia Park, Apia	Unknown
26 October 1988	Western Samoa	40–30	Tonga	1988 Pacific Cup	(Samoa) Apia Park, Apia	Unknown
29 October 1988	Western Samoa	18–26	New Zealand Māori	1988 Pacific Cup	(Samoa) Apia Park, Apia	Unknown

=== 1990s ===
Date	Home	Score	Away	Competition	Stadium	Crowd
21 October 1990	Tonga	14–4	Western Samoa	1990 Pacific Cup	(Tonga) Teufaiva Sport Stadium, Nukuʻalofa	Unknown
24October 1990	Western Samoa	66–8	Tokelau	1990 Pacific Cup	(Tonga) Teufaiva Sport Stadium, Nukuʻalofa	Unknown
26 October 1990	Western Samoa	52–2	Niue	1990 Pacific Cup	(Tonga) Teufaiva Sport Stadium, Nukuʻalofa	Unknown
28 October 1990	Western Samoa	26–22	Australian Aborigines	1990 Pacific Cup	(Tonga) Teufaiva Sport Stadium, Nukuʻalofa	Unknown
31 October 1990	Māori	18–26	Western Samoa	1990 Pacific Cup	(Tonga) Teufaiva Sport Stadium, Nukuʻalofa	Unknown
18 October 1992	Western Samoa	32–18	Fiji	1992 Pacific Cup	(New Zealand) Carlaw Park, Auckland	Unknown
20 October 1992	Western Samoa	20–12	Tonga	1992 Pacific Cup	(New Zealand) Carlaw Park, Auckland	Unknown
24 October 1992	Western Samoa	66–12	Cook Islands	1992 Pacific Cup	(New Zealand) Carlaw Park, Auckland	Unknown
26 October 1992	Western Samoa	41–28	Niue	1992 Pacific Cup	(New Zealand) Carlaw Park, Auckland	Unknown
28 October 1992	Western Samoa	44–26	Australian Aborigines	1992 Pacific Cup	(New Zealand) Carlaw Park, Auckland	Unknown
31 October 1992	Tonga	14–18	Western Samoa	1992 Pacific Cup	(New Zealand) Carlaw Park, Auckland	Unknown
21 October 1994	Fiji	14–16	Western Samoa	1994 Pacific Cup	(Fiji) ANZ National Stadium, Suva	Unknown
25 October 1994	Western Samoa	30–10	American Samoa	1994 Pacific Cup	(Fiji) ANZ National Stadium, Suva	Unknown
2 November 1994	Western Samoa	50–14	Rotuma	1994 Pacific Cup	(Fiji) ANZ National Stadium, Suva	Unknown
4 November 1994	Cook Islands	0–60	Western Samoa	1994 Pacific Cup	(Fiji) ANZ National Stadium, Suva	Unknown
9 November 1994	Tonga	34–16	UnknownWestern Samoa	1994 Pacific Cup	(Fiji) ANZ National Stadium, Suva	Unknown
11 November 1994	Western Samoa	29–22	Australian Aborigines	1994 Pacific Cup	(Fiji) ANZ National Stadium, Suva	Unknown
12 October 1995	Western Samoa	56–10	France	1995 World Cup	(Wales) Ninian Park, Cardiff	2,173
15 October 1995	Wales	22–10	Western Samoa	1995 World Cup	(Wales) Vetch Field, Swansea	15,385
6 July 1996	Western Samoa	16–39	Māori	1996 Pacific Challenge	(Samoa) Apia Park, Apia	Unknown
10 July 1996	Tonga	22–17	Western Samoa	1996 Pacific Challenge	(Tonga) Teufaiva Sport Stadium, Nukuʻalofa	Unknown
7 June 1998	Tonga	20–20	Samoa	Three-match series friendly	(Tonga) Teufaiva Sport Stadium, Nukuʻalofa	Unknown
30 June 1998	Tonga	24–8	Samoa	Three-match series friendly	(Tonga) Teufaiva Sport Stadium, Nukuʻalofa	Unknown
4 July 1998	Samoa	22–24	Tonga	Three-match series friendly	(Samoa) Apia Park, Apia	Unknown
28 July 1999	Fiji	10–6	Samoa	Three-match series friendly	(Fiji) ANZ National Stadium, Suva	Unknown
31 July 1999	Fiji	22–26	Samoa	Three-match series friendly	(Fiji) ANZ National Stadium, Suva	Unknown
4 August 1999	Fiji	30–4	Samoa	Three-match series friendly	(Fiji) ANZ National Stadium, Suva	Unknown

=== 2000s ===
Date	Home	Score	Away	Competition	Stadium	Attendance
28 October 2000	Ireland	30–16	Samoa	2000 World Cup	(Ireland) Windsor Park, Belfast	3,207
1 November 2000	Samoa	21–16	Māori	2000 World Cup	(England) Derwent Park, Workington	4,107
5 November 2000	Scotland	12–20	Samoa	2000 World Cup	(Scotland) Tynecastle, Edinburgh	1,579
11 November 2000	Samoa	10–66	Australia	2000 World Cup	(England) Vicarage Road, Watford	5,404
19 October 2004	Samoa	36–18	Niue	2004 Pacific Cup	(New Zealand) North Harbour Stadium, Auckland	Unknown
20 October 2004	Samoa	76–10	New Caledonia	2004 Pacific Cup	(New Zealand) North Harbour Stadium, Auckland	Unknown
21 October 2004	Māori	70–10	Samoa	2004 Pacific Cup	(New Zealand) Ericsson Stadium, Auckland	Unknown
23 October 2004	Samoa	52–18	Tonga	2004 Pacific Cup	(New Zealand) North Harbour Stadium, Auckland	Unknown
7 October 2005	Samoa	20–34	Tonga	Friendly	(Tonga) Teufaiva Sport Stadium, Nukuʻalofa	Unknown
23 February 2006	Fiji	26–16	Samoa	2006 Pacific Cup	(New Zealand) Mount Smart Stadium, Auckland	2,000
2 March 2006	Cook Islands	44–0	Samoa	2006 Pacific Cup	(New Zealand) Mount Smart Stadium, Auckland	2,000
5 March 2006	Tokelau	34–28	Samoa	2006 Pacific Cup	(New Zealand) Waitemata Stadium, Henderson	2,000
19 September 2006	Samoa	30–28	Fiji	2008 World Cup qualifying	(Australia) Campbelltown Stadium, Campbelltown	3,013
4 October 2006	Samoa	46–6	Cook Islands	2008 World Cup qualifying	(Australia) Western Stadium, Sydney	3,813
22 October 2006	Tonga	18–10	Samoa	2008 World Cup qualifying	(England) Headingley Stadium, Leeds	5,547
29 October 2006	France	28–6	Samoa	Federation Shield	(France) Stade Benichou, Colomiers	2,700
5 November 2006	England	38–14	Samoa	Federation Shield	(England) KC Stadium, Hull	5,698
9 November 2007	Samoa	42–10	United States	2008 World Cup qualifying	(England) Naughton Park, Widnes	753
14 November 2007	Samoa	38–16	Lebanon	2008 World Cup qualifying	(England) Post Office Road, Featherstone	1,323
31 October 2008	Samoa	20–12	Tonga	2008 World Cup	(Australia) Penrith Stadium, Penrith	11,787
5 November 2008	Samoa	16–34	Ireland	2008 World Cup	(Australia) Parramatta Stadium, Parramatta	8,602
9 November 2008	Samoa	42–10	France	2008 World Cup	(Australia) Penrith Stadium, Penrith	8,028
17 October 2009	Cook Islands	22–20	Samoa	2009 Pacific Cup	(Australia) Barlow Park, Cairns	4,261

=== 2010s ===
Date	Home	Score	Away	Competition	Stadium	Attendance
16 October 2010	New Zealand	60–6	Samoa	Friendly	(New Zealand) Mt Smart Stadium, Auckland	11,512
24 October 2010	Samoa	22–6	Tonga	Friendly	(Australia) Parramatta Stadium, Parramatta	11,308
20 April 2013	Tonga	36–4	Samoa	Friendly	(Australia) Penrith Stadium, Penrith	10,143
19 October 2013	England Knights	60–6	Samoa	Friendly	(England) Salford City Stadium, Salford	1,800
26 October 2013	New Zealand	42–24	Samoa	2013 World Cup	(England) Halliwell Jones Stadium, Warrington	14,965
4 November 2013	Samoa	38–4	Papua New Guinea	2013 World Cup	(England) Craven Park, Hull	6,871
11 November 2013	France	6–22	Samoa	2013 World Cup	(France) Stade Gilbert Brutus, Perpignan	11,576
17 November 2013	Samoa	4–22	Fiji	2013 World Cup	(England) Halliwell Jones Stadium, Warrington	12,766
3 May 2014	Samoa	32–16	Fiji	2014 Four Nations qualifier	(Australia) Penrith Stadium, Penrith	9,063
19 July 2014	United States	18–12	Samoa	Friendly	(United States) Garthwaite Stadium, Philadelphia	Unknown
25 October 2014	Samoa	26–32	England	2014 Four Nations	(Australia) Lang Park, Brisbane	47,814
1 November 2014	New Zealand	14–12	Samoa	2014 Four Nations	(New Zealand) Toll Stadium, Whangārei	16,912
9 November 2014	Australia	44–16	Samoa	2014 Four Nations	(Australia) WIN Stadium, Wollongong	18,456
2 May 2015	Samoa	18–16	Tonga	Friendly	(Australia) Cbus Super Stadium, Gold Coast	12,336
7 May 2016	Samoa	18–6	Tonga	Friendly	(Australia) Parramatta Stadium, Parramatta	15,225
8 October 2016	Samoa	18–20	Fiji	Friendly	(Samoa) Apia Park, Apia	6,871
6 May 2017	Samoa	10–30	England	Friendly	(Australia) Campbelltown Stadium, Sydney	18,271
26 October 2017	New Zealand	38–8	Samoa	2017 World Cup	(New Zealand) Mount Smart Stadium, Auckland	17,857
4 November 2017	Samoa	18–32	Tonga	2017 World Cup	(New Zealand) Waikato Stadium, Hamilton	18,156
11 November 2017	Samoa	14–14	Scotland	2017 World Cup	(Australia) Barlow Park, Cairns	4,309
17 November 2017	Australia	46–0	Samoa	2017 World Cup	(Australia) Marrara Oval, Darwin	13,473
23 June 2018	Samoa	22–38	Tonga	Friendly	(Australia) Campbelltown Stadium, Sydney	17,802
22 June 2019	Samoa	24–6	Papua New Guinea	2019 Oceania Shield	(Australia) Leichhardt Oval, Sydney	8,408
25 October 2019	Canterbury Bulls	10–56	Samoa	Friendly	(New Zealand) Ngā Puna Wai Sports Hub, Christchurch	Unknown
2 November 2019	Samoa	18–44	Fiji	2019 Oceania Shield	(New Zealand) Eden Park, Auckland	25,257

=== 2020s ===
Date	Home	Score	Away	Competition	Stadium	Crowd
25 June 2022	Samoa	42–12	Cook Islands	Friendly	(Australia) Campbelltown Sports Stadium, Leumeah	10,515
15 October 2022	England	60–6	Samoa	2021 World Cup	(England) St James' Park, Newcastle	43,199
23 October 2022	Samoa	72–6	Greece	2021 World Cup	(England) Keepmoat Stadium, Doncaster	4,415
30 October 2022	Samoa	62–4	France	2021 World Cup	(England) Halliwell Jones Stadium, Warrington	6,756
6 November 2022	Tonga	18–20	Samoa	2021 World Cup	(England) Halliwell Jones Stadium, Warrington	12,674
12 November 2022	England	26–27; G.P.	Samoa	2021 World Cup	(England) Emirates Stadium, London	40,489
19 November 2022	Australia	30–10	Samoa	2021 World Cup	(England) Old Trafford, Manchester	67,502
14 October 2023	Australia	38–12	Samoa	2023 Pacific Cup	(Australia) North Queensland Stadium, Townsville	18,144
21 October 2023	New Zealand	50–0	Samoa	2023 Pacific Cup	(New Zealand) Eden Park, Auckland	23,269
27 October 2024	England	34–18	Samoa	2024 Samoa tour of England	(England) Brick Community Stadium, Wigan	15,137
2 November 2024	England	34–16	Samoa	2024 Samoa tour of England	(England) Headingley, Leeds	16,068
19 October 2025	New Zealand	24–18	Samoa	2025 Pacific Cup	(New Zealand) Mount Smart Stadium, Auckland	21,251
26 October 2025	Samoa	34–6	Tonga	2025 Pacific Cup	(Australia) Lang Park, Brisbane	44,682
9 November 2025	New Zealand	36–14	Samoa	2025 Pacific Cup	(Australia) Western Sydney Stadium, Sydney	28,084
16 October 2026	Samoa	78–4	France	2026 World Cup	(Australia) Western Sydney Stadium, Sydney	13,174
24 October 2026	Papua New Guinea	6–64	Samoa	2026 World Cup	(Papua New Guinea) PNG Football Stadium, Port Moresby	15,008
1 November 2026	Tonga	20–18	Samoa	2026 World Cup	(Australia) Western Sydney Stadium, Sydney	29,411
8 November 2026	Australia	44–12	Samoa	2026 World Cup	(Australia) Sydney Football Stadium, Sydney	41,529

== See also ==
- Rugby league in Samoa
- Samoa national rugby league team
- Samoa women's national rugby league team
