= List of Tonga national rugby league team results =

The following list is a complete collection of results for the Tonga national rugby league team.

== Overall ==
Up to date as of 16 November 2026

Country	Matches	Won	Drawn	Lost	% Won	Year/s
American Samoa^	2	2	0	0	100%	1988–1998
Australia*	4	1	0	3	25%	2018–2024
Australian Aboriginies	1	0	0	1	0%	1994
Cook Islands	12	11	0	1	92%	1988–2022
England	7	1	0	6	14%	2006–2026
Fiji	13	7	1	5	54%	1992–2017
Fiji Presidents XIII	1	1	0	0	100%	1994
France	2	1	0	1	50%	2000–2006
Great Britain*	1	1	0	0	100%	2019
Ireland	1	1	0	0	100%	2008
Italy^	2	2	0	0	100%	2013–2017
Lebanon	2	2	0	0	100%	2017–2026
Māori~	10	3	0	8	30%	1986–2006
New Zealand	10	2	0	8	20%	1995–2026
New Zealand Residents	1	0	0	1	0%	1997
Niue	3	3	0	0	100%	1990–1994
Papua New Guinea~	9	1	1	7	11%	1995–2022
Samoa	23	11	1	11	50%	1986–2026
Scotland	3	2	0	1	67%	2008–2017
South Africa	1	1	0	0	100%	2000
Tokelau	4	4	0	0	100%	1986–2006
United States	1	1	0	0	100%	2012
Wales	1	1	0	0	100%	2022
Total	114	58	3	53	50.88%	1986–
*Includes two matches played as Tonga Invitational in 2019 (versus Great Britain and Australia).^Tally includes two matches not in the Rugby League Project list (1998 vs American Samoa and 2017 vs Italy). ~Tally includes two matches played by a Friendly Islands team in the 1990 Pacific Cup (versus Papua New Guinea and Māori). A Tonga team also participated in this tournament.

== Results ==
=== 1980s ===
Date	Home	Score	Away	Competition	Location	Attendance
29 October 1986	Tonga	34–16	Western Samoa	1986 Pacific Cup	(Cook Islands) Avarua Tereora Stadium, Avarua	Unknown
31 October 1986	Tokelau	22–26	Tonga	1986 Pacific Cup	(Cook Islands) Avarua Tereora Stadium, Avarua	Unknown
2 November 1986	Māori	27–18	Tonga	1986 Pacific Cup	(Cook Islands) Avarua Tereora Stadium, Avarua	Unknown
4 November 1986	Tonga	4–46	Western Samoa	1986 Pacific Cup	(Cook Islands) Avarua Tereora Stadium, Avarua	Unknown
20 October 1988	Tonga	38–14	American Samoa	1988 Pacific Cup	(Samoa) Apia Park, Apia	Unknown
22 October 1988	Māori	42–16	Tonga	1988 Pacific Cup	(Samoa) Apia Park, Apia	Unknown
26 October 1988	Western Samoa	40–30	Tonga	1988 Pacific Cup	(Samoa) Apia Park, Apia	Unknown
29 October 1988	Tonga	19–6	Cook Islands	1988 Pacific Cup	(Samoa) Apia Park, Apia	Unknown

=== 1990s ===
Date	Home	Score	Away	Competition	Location	Attendance
21 October 1990	Tonga	14–4	Western Samoa	1990 Pacific Cup	(Tonga) Teufaiva Sport Stadium, Nukuʻalofa	Unknown
24 October 1990	Tonga	58–4	Niue	1990 Pacific Cup	(Tonga) Teufaiva Sport Stadium, Nukuʻalofa	Unknown
26 October 1990	Tonga	26–10	Tokelau	1990 Pacific Cup	(Tonga) Teufaiva Sport Stadium, Nukuʻalofa	Unknown
28 October 1990	Māori	32–8	Tonga	1990 Pacific Cup	(Tonga) Teufaiva Sport Stadium, Nukuʻalofa	Unknown
18 October 1992	Tonga	24–8	Niue	1992 Pacific Cup	(New Zealand) Carlaw Park, Auckland	Unknown
20 October 1992	Western Samoa	20–12	Tonga	1992 Pacific Cup	(New Zealand) Carlaw Park, Auckland	Unknown
22 October 1992	Tonga	26–6	Cook Islands	1992 Pacific Cup	(New Zealand) Carlaw Park, Auckland	Unknown
24 October 1992	Tonga	23–20	Fiji	1992 Pacific Cup	(New Zealand) Carlaw Park, Auckland	Unknown
28 October 1992	Māori	6–18	Tonga	1992 Pacific Cup	(New Zealand) Carlaw Park, Auckland	Unknown
31 October 1992	Tonga	14–18	Western Samoa	1992 Pacific Cup	(New Zealand) Carlaw Park, Auckland	Unknown
26 October 1994	Tonga	28–2	Māori	1994 Pacific Cup	Suva, Fiji	Unknown
29 October 1994	Tonga	32–10	(Fiji) Presidents XIII	1994 Pacific Cup	Suva, Fiji	Unknown
3 November 1994	Australian Aboriginies	34–16	Tonga	1994 Pacific Cup	Suva, Fiji	Unknown
5 November 1994	Tonga	58–12	Niue	1994 Pacific Cup	Suva, Fiji	Unknown
9 November 1994	Western Samoa	16–34	Tonga	1994 Pacific Cup	Suva, Fiji	Unknown
12 November 1994	Fiji	11–34	Tonga	1994 Pacific Cup	Suva, Fiji	Unknown
8 October 1995	New Zealand	25–24	Tonga	1995 Rugby League World Cup	(England) Wilderspool Stadium, Warrington	8,083
10 October 1995	Papua New Guinea	28–28	Tonga	1995 Rugby League World Cup	(England) The Boulevard, Kingston-upon-Hull	5,121
3 July 1996	Māori	28–18	Tonga	Pacific Challenge	(New Zealand) Ericsson Stadium, Auckland	Unknown
8 July 1996	Papua New Guinea	56–19	Tonga	Pacific Challenge	(Papua New Guinea) Hubert Murray Stadium, Port Moresby	Unknown
10 July 1996	Tonga	22–17	Western Samoa	Pacific Challenge	(Tonga) Tefuaiwa Stadium, Nuku'alofa	Unknown
11 May 1997	Māori	46–10	Tonga	1997 Pacific Cup	(New Zealand) Carlaw Park, Auckland	Unknown
13 May 1997	New Zealand Residents	32–10	Tonga	1997 Pacific Cup	(New Zealand) Carlaw Park, Auckland	Unknown
15 May 1997	Tonga	14–14	Fiji	1997 Pacific Cup	(New Zealand) Carlaw Park, Auckland	Unknown
18 May 1997	Fiji	22–20	Tonga	1997 Pacific Cup	(New Zealand) Carlaw Park, Auckland	Unknown
7 June 1998	Tonga	20–20	Samoa	Friendly	(Tonga) Teufaiva Sport Stadium, Nukuʻalofa	Unknown
30 June 1998	Tonga	24–8	Samoa	Friendly	(Tonga) Teufaiva Sport Stadium, Nukuʻalofa	Unknown
1 July 1998	Tonga	14–22	Fiji	Friendly	(Tonga) Teufaiva Sport Stadium, Nukuʻalofa	Unknown
4 July 1998	Samoa	22–24	Tonga	Friendly	(Samoa) Apia Park, Apia	Unknown
11 October 1998	Papua New Guinea	44–28	Tonga	Papua New Guinea 50th Anniversary Tournament	(Papua New Guinea) PNG Football Stadium, Port Moresby	Unknown
14 October 1998	Tonga	30–22	Cook Islands	Papua New Guinea 50th Anniversary Tournament	(Papua New Guinea) PNG Football Stadium, Port Moresby	Unknown
18 October 1998	Papua New Guinea	54–12	Tonga	Papua New Guinea 50th Anniversary Tournament	(Papua New Guinea) PNG Football Stadium, Port Moresby	Unknown
30 July 1999	Tonga	42–4	Cook Islands	Three-match series friendly	(Tonga) Teufaiva Sport Stadium, Nukuʻalofa	Unknown
3 August 1999	Tonga	28–13	Cook Islands	Three-match series friendly	(Tonga) Teufaiva Sport Stadium, Nukuʻalofa	Unknown
4 August 1999	Tonga	34–4	Cook Islands	Three-match series friendly	(Tonga) Teufaiva Sport Stadium, Nukuʻalofa	Unknown
22 October 1999	New Zealand	74–0	Tonga	Friendly	(New Zealand) Carlaw Park, Auckland	4,528

=== 2000s ===
Date	Home	Score	Away	Competition	Location	Attendance
37 May 2000	Tonga	6–10	Fiji	Two-match series friendly	(Tonga) Teufaiva Sport Stadium, Nukuʻalofa	Unknown
3 June 2000	Papua New Guinea	22–18	Tonga	Two-match series friendly	(Fiji) ANZ National Stadium, Suva	Unknown
28 October 2000	Tonga	66–18	South Africa	2000 Rugby League World Cup	(France) Charlety Stadium, Paris	7,498
1 November 2000	France	28–8	Tonga	2000 Rugby League World Cup	(France) Stade d'Albert Domec, Carcassonne	10,288
6 November 2000	Papua New Guinea	30–22	Tonga	2000 Rugby League World Cup	(France) Stadium Municipal, Toulouse	3,666
4 October 2004	Tonga	10–18	Cook Islands	Friendly	(New Zealand) North Harbour Stadium, Auckland	Unknown
17 October 2004	Fiji	6–56	Tonga	Pacific Rim Championship	(New Zealand) North Harbour Stadium, Auckland	900
19 October 2004	Tonga	10–18	Cook Islands	Pacific Rim Championship	(New Zealand) North Harbour Stadium, Auckland	700
23 October 2004	Tonga	18–52	Samoa	2004 Pacific Cup (Final)	(New Zealand) North Harbour Stadium, Auckland	Unknown
7 October 2005	Samoa	20–34	Tonga	Friendly	(Tonga) Teufaiva Sport Stadium, Nuku'Alofa	Unknown
23 February 2006	Tonga	64–0	Tokelau	2006 Pacific Cup	(New Zealand) Ericsson Stadium, Auckland	2,000
26 February 2006	Tonga	42–14	Māori	2006 Pacific Cup	(New Zealand) Waitemata Stadium, Henderson	2,000
5 March 2006	Tonga	22–4	Fiji	2006 Pacific Cup	(New Zealand) Waitemata Stadium, Henderson	2,000
29 September 2006	Tonga	56–14	Cook Islands	2008 Rugby League World Cup Qualifying	(Australia) Campbelltown Stadium, Campbelltown	3,013
4 October 2006	Fiji	30–28	Tonga	2008 Rugby League World Cup Qualifying	(Australia) Western Weekender Stadium, Sydney	3,813
25 October 2006	Cumbria	28–16	Tonga	Friendly	(Cumbria) Derwent Park, Workington	1,639
22 October 2006	Tonga	18–10	Samoa	Federation Shield	(England) Headingley Rugby Stadium, Leeds	5,547
29 October 2006	England	40–18	Tonga	Federation Shield	(England) Twickenham Stoop, London	2,388
5 November 2006	France	10–48	Tonga	Federation Shield	(France) Municipal Stadium Pierre Antoine, Castres	8,500
12 November 2006	England	32–14	Tonga	Federation Shield	(England) Halton Stadium, Widnes	3,000
19 October 2007	Tonga	14–12	Fiji	Friendly	(Tonga) Teufaiva Sport Stadium, Nuku'Alofa	4,000
18 October 2008	New Zealand	56–8	Tonga	Friendly	(New Zealand) Mt Smart Stadium, Auckland	Unknown
27 October 2008	Tonga	22–20	Ireland	2008 Rugby League World Cup	(Australia) Parramatta Stadium, Sydney	6,165
31 October 2008	Samoa	20–12	Tonga	2008 Rugby League World Cup	(Australia) Penrith Stadium, Sydney	11,787
8 November 2008	Scotland	0–48	Tonga	2008 Rugby League World Cup	(Australia) Browne Park, Rockhampton	5,942
14 October 2009	New Zealand	40–24	Tonga	Friendly	(New Zealand) Rotorua International Stadium, Rotorua	8,000
25 October 2009	Papua New Guinea	44–14	Tonga	2009 Pacific Cup	(Papua New Guinea) Lloyd Robson Oval, Port Moresby	9,813
31 October 2009	Fiji	26–16	Tonga	2009 Pacific Cup	(Papua New Guinea) Lloyd Robson Oval, Port Moresby	2,000

=== 2010s ===
Date	Home	Score	Away	Competition	Location	Attendance
24 October 2010	Samoa	22–6	Tonga	Friendly	(Australia) Parramatta Stadium, Parramatta	11,308
12 May 2012	United States	20–28	Tonga	Friendly	(United States) Kaiser Stadium, Honolulu	Unknown
20 April 2013	Samoa	4–36	Tonga	Friendly	(Australia) Centrebet Stadium, Penrith	10,143
29 October 2013	Tonga	24–26	Scotland	2013 Rugby League World Cup	(England) Derwent Park, Workington	7,630
5 November 2013	Tonga	22–16	Cook Islands	2013 Rugby League World Cup	(England) Leigh Sports Village, Leigh	10,554
10 November 2013	Tonga	16–0	Italy	2013 Rugby League World Cup	(England) The Shay, Halifax	10,226
19 October 2014	Papua New Guinea	32–18	Tonga	Friendly	(Papua New Guinea) Lae Oval, Lae	Unknown
2 May 2015	Samoa	18–16	Tonga	Friendly	(Australia) Cbus Super Stadium, Robina	12,336
17 October 2015	Tonga	28–8	Cook Islands	2017 Rugby League World Cup Qualifying	(Australia) Campbelltown Stadium, Campbelltown	4,813
7 May 2016	Samoa	18–6	Tonga	Friendly	(Australia) Pirtek Stadium, Parramatta	15,225
6 May 2017	Tonga	26–24	Fiji	Friendly	(Australia) Campbelltown Stadium, Campbelltown	18,271
20 October 2017	Italy	6–16	Tonga	Friendly	(Australia) Callendar Park, Innisfail	Unknown
29 October 2017	Scotland	4–50	Tonga	2017 Rugby League World Cup	(Australia) Barlow Park, Cairns	9,216
4 November 2017	Samoa	18–32	Tonga	2017 Rugby League World Cup	(New Zealand) Waikato Stadium, Hamilton	18,156
11 November 2017	New Zealand	22–28	Tonga	2017 Rugby League World Cup	(New Zealand) Waikato Stadium, Hamilton	24,041
18 November 2017	Tonga	24–22	Lebanon	2017 Rugby League World Cup	(New Zealand) Christchurch Stadium, Christchurch	8,309
25 November 2017	Tonga	18–20	England	2017 Rugby League World Cup	(New Zealand) Mt Smart Stadium, Auckland	30,003
23 June 2018	Samoa	22–38	Tonga	Friendly	(Australia) Campbelltown Stadium, Sydney	17,802
20 October 2018	Australia	34–16	Tonga	Friendly	(New Zealand) Mt Smart Stadium, Auckland	26,144
22 June 2019	New Zealand	34–14	Tonga	2019 Oceania Cup	(New Zealand) Mt Smart Stadium, Auckland	23,634
26 October 2019	Tonga	14–6	Great Britain	2019 Lions tour	(New Zealand) Waikato Stadium, Hamilton	9,420
2 November 2019	Tonga	16–12	Australia	2019 Oceania Cup	(New Zealand) Eden Park, Auckland	25,575

=== 2020s ===
Date	Home	Score	Away	Competition	Location	Attendance
25 June 2022	New Zealand	26–6	Tonga	Friendly	(New Zealand) Mt Smart Stadium, Auckland	20,766
8 October 2022	France	12–48	Tonga	Friendly	(England) The Shay, Halifax	876
18 October 2022	Tonga	22–18	Papua New Guinea	2021 Rugby League World Cup	(England) Totally Wicked Stadium, St Helens	10,409
24 October 2022	Tonga	32–6	Wales	2021 Rugby League World Cup	(England) Totally Wicked Stadium, St Helens	7,752
30 October 2022	Tonga	92–10	Cook Islands	2021 Rugby League World Cup	(England) Riverside Stadium, Middlesbrough	8,342
6 November 2022	Tonga	18–20	Samoa	2021 Rugby League World Cup	(England) Halliwell Jones Stadium, Warrington	12,674
22 October 2023	England	22–18	Tonga	2023 Tonga rugby league tour of England	(England) Totally Wicked Stadium, St Helens	12,898
28 October 2023	England	14–4	Tonga	2023 Tonga rugby league tour of England	(England) Kirklees Stadium, Huddersfield	11,210
4 November 2023	England	26–4	Tonga	2023 Tonga rugby league tour of England	(England) Headingley, Leeds	15,477
18 October 2024	Australia	18–0	Tonga	2024 Pacific Cup	(Australia) Lang Park, Brisbane	33,196
2 November 2024	New Zealand	24–25	Tonga	2024 Pacific Cup	(New Zealand) Mount Smart Stadium, Auckland	22,363
10 November 2024	Australia	20–14	Tonga	2024 Pacific Cup	(Australia) Western Sydney Stadium, Sydney	28,728
26 October 2025	Samoa	34–6	Tonga	2025 Pacific Cup	(Australia) Lang Park, Brisbane	44,682
2 November 2025	New Zealand	40–14	Tonga	2025 Pacific Cup	(New Zealand) Eden Park, Auckland	38,114
16 October 2026	England	12–30	Tonga	2026 World Cup	(Australia) Perth Rectangular Stadium, Perth	18,302
24 October 2026	Tonga	36–0	Lebanon	2026 World Cup	(Australia) Western Sydney Stadium, Sydney	25,065
1 November 2026	Tonga	20–18	Samoa	2026 World Cup	(Australia) Western Sydney Stadium, Sydney	29,144
1 November 2026	New Zealand	34–10	Tonga	2026 World Cup	(Australia) Newcastle International Sports Centre, Newcastle	29,712

== See also ==
- Tonga National Rugby League
- Tonga national rugby league team
- Rugby league in Tonga
