= List of Cook Islands national rugby league team results =

The following is a list of Cook Islands national rugby league team results from their debut in 1986.

== All-time Record ==
Below is table of the representative rugby matches played by a Cook Islands national XIII at test level up until 23 October 2025.

Opponent	Matches	Won	Drawn	Lost	Win %	For	Aga	Diff
American Samoa	1	1	0	0	100%	22	20	+2
Fiji	15	5	1	9	33.33%	251	449	–198
Ireland	1	1	0	0	100%	22	6	+16
Lebanon	3	2	1	0	66.67%	80	66	+14
New Zealand	2	0	0	2	0%	10	134	–56
(Māori people) New Zealand Maori	12	4	1	7	33.33%	216	312	–96
New Zealand Residents	2	0	0	2	0%	10	134	–124
Niue	3	2	0	1	66.67%	67	74	–7
Papua New Guinea	8	0	0	8	0%	114	312	–198
Rotuma	1	0	0	1	0%	10	17	–17
Russia	1	1	0	0	100%	58	20	+38
Samoa	8	2	0	6	25%	112	334	–222
Scotland	1	1	0	0	100%	21	10	+11
South Africa	1	1	0	0	100%	66	6	+60
Tokelau	1	1	0	0	100%	19	10	+9
Tonga	12	1	0	11	8.33%	151	425	–274
United States	3	2	0	1	66.67%	122	56	+66
Wales	3	2	0	1	66.67%	52	74	–22
Total	78	26	3	49	33.33%	1,403	2,459	–1056

== Results ==
=== 1980s ===
Date	Home	Score	Away	Competition	Venue	Attendance
27 October 1986	Cook Islands	22–8	Niue	1986 Pacific Cup	(Cook Islands) Avarua Tereora Stadium, Rarotonga	Unknown
31 October 1986	Cook Islands	10–32	New Zealand Māori	1986 Pacific Cup	(Cook Islands) Avarua Tereora Stadium, Rarotonga	Unknown
2 November 1986	Cook Islands	0–48	Western Samoa	1986 Pacific Cup	(Cook Islands) Avarua Tereora Stadium, Rarotonga	Unknown
18 October 1988	Cook Islands	19–10	Tokelau	1988 Pacific Cup	Apia Park, Samoa	Unknown
20 October 1988	Western Samoa	52–16	Cook Islands	1988 Pacific Cup	Apia Park, Samoa	Unknown
26 October 1988	Cook Islands	20–70	New Zealand Māori	1988 Pacific Cup	Apia Park, Samoa	Unknown
29 October 1988	Cook Islands	6–19	Tonga	1988 Pacific Cup	Apia Park, Samoa	Unknown

=== 1990s ===
Date	Home	Score	Away	Competition	Venue	Attendance
2 June 1990	Cook Islands	21–15	(United Kingdom) BARLA	1990 BARLA Tour	(Cook Islands) Avarua Tereora Stadium, Rarotonga	2,500
20 October 1992	Cook Islands	23–22	Niue	1992 Pacific Cup	(New Zealand) Carlaw Park, Auckland	Unknown
22 October 1992	Cook Islands	6–26	Tonga	1992 Pacific Cup	(New Zealand) Carlaw Park, Auckland	Unknown
24 October 1992	Cook Islands	12–66	Western Samoa	1992 Pacific Cup	(New Zealand) Carlaw Park, Auckland	Unknown
26 October 1992	Cook Islands	6–58	Fiji	1992 Pacific Cup	(New Zealand) Carlaw Park, Auckland	Unknown
June 1994	Cook Islands	28–12	(United Kingdom) BARLA	1994 BARLA Tour	(Cook Islands) Avarua Tereora Stadium, Rarotonga	3,523
21 October 1994	Rotuma	17–10	Cook Islands	1994 Pacific Cup	(Fiji) ANZ National Stadium, Suva	2,000
25 October 1994	Fiji	19–11	Cook Islands	1994 Pacific Cup	(Fiji) ANZ National Stadium, Suva	4,000
28 October 1994	American Samoa	20–22	Cook Islands	1994 Pacific Cup	(Fiji) ANZ National Stadium, Suva	1,400
4 November 1994	Cook Islands	0–60	Western Samoa	1994 Pacific Cup	(Fiji) ANZ National Stadium, Suva	2,000
16 October 1995	Cook Islands	64–6	United States	1995 Rugby League Emerging Nations Tournament	(England) Post Office Road, Featherstone	3,133
18 October 1995	Cook Islands	58–20	Russia	1995 Rugby League Emerging Nations Tournament	(England) Hilton Park, Leigh	1,921
20 October 1995	Cook Islands	21–10	Scotland	1995 Rugby League Emerging Nations Tournament	(England) Wheldon Road, Castleford	2,889
24 October 1995	Cook Islands	22–6	Ireland	1995 Rugby League Emerging Nations Tournament	(England) Gigg Lane, Bury	4,147
3 July 1996	Cook Islands	8–14	Fiji	1996 Pacific Cup	(New Zealand) Mount Smart Stadium, Auckland	3,000
10 July 1996	Cook Islands	4–16	New Zealand	1996 Pacific Cup	(New Zealand) Avarua Tereora Stadium	3,000
11 May 1997	Cook Islands	22–14	Fiji	1997 Pacific Cup	(New Zealand) Carlaw Park, Auckland	Unknown
13 May 1997	Cook Islands	12–34	Papua New Guinea	1997 Pacific Cup	(New Zealand) Carlaw Park, Auckland	Unknown
15 May 1997	New Zealand	46–2	Cook Islands	1997 Pacific Cup	(New Zealand) Carlaw Park, Auckland	Unknown
18 May 1997	Cook Islands	14–38	Papua New Guinea	1997 Pacific Cup	(New Zealand) Carlaw Park, Auckland	Unknown
24 June 1998	Cook Islands	18–10	Māori	Māori Tour	(Cook Islands) Avarua Tereora Stadium, Rarotonga	1,500
28 June 1998	Cook Islands	14–24	Māori	Māori Tour	(Cook Islands) Avarua Tereora Stadium, Rarotonga	1,700
5 July 1998	Cook Islands	8–24	Māori	Māori Tour	(Cook Islands) Avarua Tereora Stadium, Rarotonga	2,300
7 October 1998	Papua New Guinea	46–6	Cook Islands	PNG RL 50th Anniversary Tournament	(Papua New Guinea) Lae Rugby League Ground, Lae	8,000
11 October 1998	Cook Islands	16–8	Māori	PNG RL 50th Anniversary Tournament	(Papua New Guinea) Kalabond Oval, Kokopo	6,000
14 October 1998	Cook Islands	22–30	Tonga	PNG RL 50th Anniversary Tournament	(Papua New Guinea) Kalabond Oval, Kokopo	6,000
18 October 1998	Cook Islands	6–28	Māori	PNG RL 50th Anniversary Tournament	(Papua New Guinea) Lloyd Robson Oval, Port Moresby	9,000
October 1998	American Samoa	40–34	Cook Islands	1998 Pacific Cup	(New Zealand) Carlaw Park, Auckland	Unknown
October 1998	Cook Islands	8–16	Tonga	1998 Pacific Cup	(New Zealand) Carlaw Park, Auckland	Unknown
October 1998	Cook Islands	22–16	Tokelau	1998 Pacific Cup	(New Zealand) Carlaw Park, Auckland	Unknown
30 July 1999	Tonga	28–13	Cook Islands	Test Series	(Tonga) Teufaiva Sport Stadium, Nukuʻalofa	Unknown
3 August 1999	Tonga	42–2	Cook Islands	Test Series	(Tonga) Teufaiva Sport Stadium, Nukuʻalofa	Unknown
4 August 1999	Tonga	34–4	Cook Islands	Test Series	(Tonga) Teufaiva Sport Stadium, Nukuʻalofa	Unknown

=== 2000s ===
Date	Home	Score	Away	Competition	Venue	Attendance
29 October 2000	Wales	38–6	Cook Islands	2000 Rugby League World Cup	(Wales) Racecourse Ground, Wrexham	5,060
2 November 2000	Cook Islands	10–84	New Zealand	2000 Rugby League World Cup	(England) Madejski Stadium, Reading	3,982
5 November 2000	Cook Islands	22–22	Lebanon	2000 Rugby League World Cup	(Wales) Millennium Stadium, Cardiff	5,500
17 August 2004	Fiji	24–36	Cook Islands	Test Series	(Fiji) ANZ National Stadium, Suva	Unknown
24 August 2004	Fiji	14–22	Cook Islands	Test Series	(Fiji) ANZ National Stadium, Suva	Unknown
4 October 2004	Cook Islands	30–38	Tonga	Friendly	Unknown	Unknown
19 October 2004	Cook Islands	18–10	Tonga	2004 Pacific Cup	(New Zealand) Mount Smart Stadium, Auckland	700
21 October 2004	Cook Islands	20–12	Fiji	2004 Pacific Cup	(New Zealand) Mount Smart Stadium, Auckland	1,000
23 October 2004	Māori	4–46	Cook Islands	2004 Pacific Cup	(New Zealand) North Harbour Stadium, Auckland	
8 October 2005	Māori	26–26	Cook Islands	International Series	Unknown	Unknown
13 October 2005	Māori		Cook Islands	International Series	Unknown	Unknown
16 October 2005	Māori	16–24	Cook Islands	International Series	Unknown	Unknown
29 September 2006	Cook Islands	14–56	Tonga	2008 Rugby League World Cup qualifying	(Australia) Campbelltown Stadium, Sydney	3,013
4 October 2006	Cook Islands	6–46	Samoa	2008 Rugby League World Cup qualifying	(Australia) St Mary's Saints Leagues Stadium, Sydney	3,813
7 October 2006	Cook Islands	4–40	Fiji	2008 Rugby League World Cup qualifying	(Australia) CUA Stadium, Penrith	1,713
4 October 2004	Cook Islands	12–50	Fiji	Friendly	Unknown	Unknown
17 October 2009	Cook Islands	22–20	Samoa	2009 Pacific Cup	(Australia) Barlow Park, Cairns	4,261
24 October 2009	Cook Islands	24–22	Fiji	2009 Pacific Cup	(Papua New Guinea) Lloyd Robson Oval, Port Moresby	3,269
1 November 2009	Papua New Guinea	42–14	Cook Islands	2009 Pacific Cup	(Papua New Guinea) Lloyd Robson Oval, Port Moresby	10,151

=== 2010s ===
Date	Home	Score	Away	Competition	Venue	Attendance
7 October 2012	Cook Islands	28–24	Lebanon	Friendly	The Crest Stadium, Sydney	2,500
20 October 2013	Cook Islands	0–50	New Zealand	Friendly	(England) Keepmoat Stadium, Doncaster	4,638
30 October 2013	Cook Islands	20–32	United States	2013 Rugby League World Cup	(England) Memorial Stadium, Bristol	7,247
5 November 2013	Cook Islands	16–22	Tonga	2013 Rugby League World Cup	(England) Leigh Sports Village, Leigh	10,554
10 November 2013	Cook Islands	28–24	Wales	2013 Rugby League World Cup	(Wales) The Gnoll, Neath	3,270
3 October 2015	Cook Islands	22–44	Niue	Friendly	Sydney	N/A
17 October 2015	Cook Islands	8–28	Tonga	2017 Rugby League World Cup qualifying	(Australia) Campbelltown Stadium, Sydney	4,813
8 May 2016	Cook Islands	30–20	Lebanon	Friendly	(Australia) Belmore Oval, Sydney	2,000
6 May 2017	Cook Islands	22–32	Papua New Guinea	International - Pacific Test	(Australia) Campbelltown Stadium, Sydney	18,271
21 June 2019	Cook Islands	66–6	South Africa	2021 Rugby League World Cup qualification – Repechage	(Australia) Ringrose Park, Sydney	2,621
16 November 2019	United States	16–38	Cook Islands	2021 Rugby League World Cup qualification – Repechage	(United States) Hodges Stadium, Jacksonville	150

=== 2020s ===
Date	Home	Score	Away	Competition	Venue	Attendance
25 June 2022	Samoa	42–12	Cook Islands	Friendly	(Australia) Campbelltown Sports Stadium, Leumeah	10,515
19 October 2022	Wales	12–18	Cook Islands	2021 Rugby League World Cup	(England) Leigh Sports Village, Leigh	6,188
25 October 2022	Papua New Guinea	32–16	Cook Islands	2021 Rugby League World Cup	(England) Halliwell Jones Stadium, Warrington	6,273
30 October 2022	Tonga	92–10	Cook Islands	2021 Rugby League World Cup	(England) Riverside Stadium, Middlesbrough	8,342
15 October 2023	Papua New Guinea	46–10	Cook Islands	2023 Pacific Bowl	(Papua New Guinea) PNG Football Stadium, Port Moresby	7,133
22 October 2023	Cook Islands	18–22	Fiji	2023 Pacific Bowl	(Papua New Guinea) PNG Football Stadium, Port Moresby	7,001
27 October 2024	Cook Islands	6–56	Fiji	2024 Pacific Bowl	(Fiji) ANZ National Stadium, Suva	5,943
3 November 2024	Papua New Guinea	42–20	Cook Islands	2024 Pacific Bowl	(Papua New Guinea) PNG Football Stadium, Port Moresby	Unknown
18 October 2025	Fiji	44–24	Cook Islands	2025 Pacific Bowl	(Papua New Guinea) PNG Football Stadium, Port Moresby	Unknown
25 October 2025	Papua New Guinea	40–28	Cook Islands	2025 Pacific Bowl	(Papua New Guinea) PNG Football Stadium, Port Moresby	14,864
9 November 2025	Cook Islands	58–6	South Africa	2026 World Cup Qualification – Southern Hemisphere Playoff	(Australia) Western Sydney Stadium, Sydney	3,245
18 October 2026	Fiji	40–12	Cook Islands	2026 Rugby League World Cup	(Australia) Newcastle International Sports Centre, Newcastle	10,604
25 October 2026	New Zealand	82–16	Cook Islands	2026 Rugby League World Cup	(New Zealand) Te Kaha, Christchurch	24,868
31 October 2026	Australia	66–6	Cook Islands	2026 Rugby League World Cup	(Australia) North Queensland Stadium, Townsville	19,172
