= Fi-Ta =

Australian sportswear clothing company

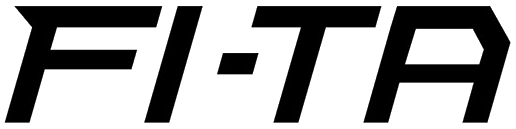
- Type: Private
- Industry: Textile
- Founded: 2010; 16 years ago
- Defunct: 2021
- Headquarters: Sydney, Australia
- Area served: Oceania, Europe
- Products: Sportswear

Fi-Ta was an Australian manufacturing company established in 2010 in the Sydney suburb of Marrickville, New South Wales. The company produced and supplied sportswear for cricket, rugby league, soccer, and field hockey teams.

== Former sponsorships ==
=== Rugby league ===
- Greece
- Lebanon
- Niue
- Italy (2013–2017)
- Papua New Guinea (2012–2021)
- Samoa (2013–2021)
- Tonga (2013–2018)
- (Australia) NRL match officials (2012–2020)
- Queensland Rugby League officials (until 2020)
- (England) Hull Kingston Rovers (2014–2016)

=== Soccer ===
- (Australia) Gold Coast United (2010–2012)
