= Pacific Cup =

Rugby league competition

- Sport: Rugby league
- Instituted: 1974
- Ceased: 2009
- Replaced by: Pacific Rugby League Championship
- Number of teams: 6
- Region: Pacific (Pacific International)
- Holders: Papua New Guinea (2009)
- Most titles: Māori (4 titles)
- Related competition: European Cup

The Pacific Cup was a rugby league football competition, inaugurated in 1974, as a development competition for national teams from the Pacific region outside of Australia and New Zealand. The tournament ceased in 2009.

In 2019, a similar competition called the "Oceania Cup" was founded. This time it featured Australia and New Zealand, in addition to many of the Pacific Cup nations, who had since established themselves in the sport. The competition has a single edition due to the COVID-19 pandemic and was re-founded in 2023 as the Rugby League Pacific Championship.

== History ==
The Pacific Cup was started in 1975 by Keith Gittoes of the New South Wales Rugby League. It was held twice in the 1970s before being abandoned due to cost.

The competition was revived in 1986 by Peter Donnelly. This was a true Pacific Cup with Polynesian players playing for their true country of origin rather than for the NZ Maoris as had previously been the case . The competition was held biennially until the 1996 competition was postponed. Instead a 1996 Pacific Challenge was held. The Super League ran an Oceania Cup in 1997.

The Pacific Cup was revived by the New Zealand Rugby League once again in 2004, this time as a secondary competition to the Pacific Rim Championship. It was again held in February and March 2006 under NZRL administration, this time as a main competition.

In the post-2008 Rugby League World Cup shake up of the international calendar by the RLIF, it was confirmed that a Pacific Cup was to be held in 2009 with the winner of the tournament entering the 2010 Four Nations tournament.

The 2009 tournament was hosted by Papua New Guinea. The competing teams were Cook Islands, Fiji, Papua New Guinea, Samoa and Tonga.

== Appearances ==
Eighteen teams from ten nations have taken part in the 12 Pacific Cup tournaments held to date:

- Māori – 11 appearances
- Tonga – 10 appearances
- Samoa – 9 appearances
- Cook Islands – 7 appearances
- Fiji – 7 appearances
- Papua New Guinea – 6 appearances
- Tokelau – 5 appearances (1986, 1988, 1990, 1992, 2006)
- Niue – 5 appearances (1986, 1990, 1992, 1994, 2004)
- American Samoa – 3 appearances (1988, 1992, 1994)
- Australian Aborigines – 3 appearances (1990, 1992, 1994)
- New Zealand Residents – 2 appearances (1996, 1997)
- Western Australia – 2 appearances (1975, 1977)
- (Victoria (state)) Victoria – 2 appearances (1975, 1977)
- Fijian Presidents XIII – 1 appearance (1994)
- Rotuma – 1 appearance (1994)
- Norfolk Island – 1 appearance (1992)
- (Tonga) Friendly Islands – 1 appearance (1990)
- Northern Territory – 1 appearance (1977)

== Finals ==
Year	Host	Winner	Score	Runner-up	Losing semi	-finalists	Number of teams
1975	Papua New Guinea	Māori	38–13	Papua New Guinea	n/a	n/a	4
1977	New Zealand	Māori	35–12	Western Australia	n/a	n/a	5
1986	Cook Islands	Māori	23–6	Samoa	Tonga	Cook Islands	6
1988	Samoa	Māori	26–16	Samoa	Tonga	Cook Islands	6
1990	Tonga	Samoa	26–18	Māori	Tonga	Australian Aboriginies	8
1992	New Zealand	Samoa	18–14	Tonga	Māori	Australian Aboriginies	10
1994	Fiji	Tonga	34–11	Fiji	Samoa	Australian Aboriginies	9
1997	New Zealand	New Zealand Residents	20–15	Māori	n/a	n/a	6
2004	New Zealand	Cook Islands	26–16	Māori	n/a	n/a	6
2006	New Zealand	Tonga	22–14	Fiji	n/a	n/a	6
2009	Papua New Guinea	Papua New Guinea	42–14	Cook Islands	Tonga	Fiji	5

=== Results ===
Team	Titles	Runners-up	Semi-finals
Māori	4 (1975, 1977, 1986, 1988)	1 (1990)	1 (1992)
Tonga	2 (1994, 2006)	1 (1992)	4 (1986, 1988, 1990, 2009)
Samoa	2 (1990, 1992)	2 (1986, 1988)	1 (1994)
Cook Islands	1 (2004)	1 (2009)	2 (1986, 1988)
Papua New Guinea	1 (2009)	1 (1975)	-
New Zealand Residents	1 (1997)	-	-
Fiji	-	2 (1994, 2007)	1 (2009)
Western Australia	-	1 (1977)	-
Australian Aboriginies	-	-	3 (1990, 1992, 1994)

== See also ==
- Pacific Rugby League Championship
