= 1998 Pacific Cup =

- Number of teams: 4
- Host country: New Zealand
- Winner: Tonga
- Matches played: 6

The 1998 Pacific Cup was an international rugby league tournament played in the Pacific region. The tournament was played in New Zealand with all matches played at Carlaw Park in Auckland. All four nations that participated picked primarily Auckland based players. The Cook Islands and Tonga also played in the Papua New Guinea 50th Anniversary Tournament played during the same month. Papua New Guinea, Fiji and Samoa declined an invitation to compete. All four nations played each other once with the top nation crowned winners. The last match between American Samoa and Tonga turned out to be, effectively, a final after both won their first two games. Tonga won that match to win the tournament.

== Results ==
- – American Samoa 40–34 Cook Islands
- – Tokelau 4–18 Tonga
- – American Samoa 54–12 Tokelau
- – Cook Islands 8–16 Tonga
- – Cook Islands 22–16 Tokelau
- – American Samoa 16–18 Tonga

== Table ==
Pos	Nation	Pld	W	D	L	PF	PA	Pts
1	Tonga	3	3	0	0	52	28	6
2	American Samoa	3	2	0	1	110	64	4
3	Cook Islands	3	1	0	2	64	72	2
4	Tokelau	3	0	0	3	32	94	0
