= John Fifita =

Tonga international rugby league footballer

Personal information
- Born: 28 July 1959 (age 66); Nuku'alofa, Tonga

Playing information
- Position: Prop, Second-row
Club
Years	Team	Pld	T	G	FG	P
1984–90	St. George Dragons	76	5	0	0	20
1987–88	Castleford	24	6	0	0	24
	Total	100	11	0	0	44
Representative
Years	Team	Pld	T	G	FG	P
1986–88	Tonga	10	2	0	0	8

John Fifita (Tongan: Sione Fifita) (born 28 July 1959) is a Tongan former professional rugby league footballer who represented Tonga in the 1986 Pacific Cup and played as a professional in England and Australia.

== Playing career ==
Fifita played for the St George Dragons between 1984 and 1990, starting in 76 first grade matches for the club.

In 1986 Fifita was part of the Tonga side that competed in the 1986 Pacific Cup. He was named in the team of the tournament. He again represented Tonga at the 1988 Pacific Cup.

In the 1987/88 off-season Fifita travelled to England and played for the Castleford club.

Fifita played at second-row in Castleford's 12-12 draw with Bradford Northern in the 1987 Yorkshire Cup Final during the 1987–88 season at Headingley, Leeds on Saturday 17 October 1987, and played at prop (replaced by Interchange Dean Sampson) in the 2-11 defeat by Bradford Northern in the 1987 Yorkshire Cup Final replay during the 1987–88 season at Elland Road, Leeds on Saturday 31 October 1987.
