= Dick Uluave =

NZ & Tonga international rugby league footballer

Personal information
- Full name: Stephen Jeffery Uluave
- Born: 6 May 1954 (age 71); Nukuʻalofa, Tonga

Playing information
- Position: Wing
Representative
Years	Team	Pld	T	G	FG	P
	Manawatu
1977–84	New Zealand Māori
1979	New Zealand	2	1	0	0	3
1986–88	Tonga

Stephen Jeffery "Dick" Uluave (born 1954) is a former rugby league footballer who represented both New Zealand and Tonga at international level.

== Early years ==
Born in Tonga in 1954, Uluave emigrated to New Zealand in 1972.

== Playing career ==
Uluave represented the Manwatu district and is known for being the only ever Manawatu representative to play for the national side.

He also played for New Zealand Māori. He toured the United Kingdom in 1983 with the New Zealand Māori side.

In 1979 he was selected for the New Zealand national rugby league team and played in two test matches, scoring one try.

Uluave played for Tonga in the 1986 Pacific Cup and was named in the team of the tournament. He again represented Tonga at the 1988 Pacific Cup.
