= 1990 Pacific Cup =

- Number of teams: 8
- Host country: Tonga
- Winner: Western Samoa (1st title)
- Matches played: 15

The 1990 Pacific Cup was the fifth edition of the Pacific Cup, a rugby league tournament held between Pacific teams. The tournament was hosted by Tonga and eventually won by Western Samoa, who defeated New Zealand Māori 26–18 in the final, a replay of the 1988 final.

== Squads ==
- The Australian Aborigines squad included Ricky Walford, Graham Lyons and Ron Gibbs.
- The New Zealand Māori squad included Dean Clark, Sean Hoppe, Jason Mackie and captain Kelly Shelford.
- The Friendly Islands side was made up mainly of local Tongan players.
- Western Samoa included Se'e Solomona, Tony Tatupu. Vae Afoa and Tony Tuimavave.

== Results ==
=== Group A ===
	Team	Pld	W	D	L	Pts
1	NZ Māori	3	3	0	0	6
2	Australian Aborigines	3	2	0	1	4
3	Papua New Guinea	3	1	0	2	2
4	Friendly Islands	3	0	0	3	0

1990

NZ Māori	24 – 13	Australian Aborigines

Nuku'alofa, Tonga

1990

Papua New Guinea	16 – 14	Friendly Islands

Nuku'alofa, Tonga

1990

NZ Māori	20 – 4	Friendly Islands

Nuku'alofa, Tonga

1990

Australian Aborigines	28 – 18	Papua New Guinea

Nuku'alofa, Tonga

1990

NZ Māori	46 – 14	Papua New Guinea

Nuku'alofa, Tonga

1990

Australian Aborigines	54 – 12	Friendly Islands

Nuku'alofa, Tonga

=== Group B ===
	Team	Pld	W	D	L	Pts
1	Western Samoa	3	3	0	0	6
2	Tonga	3	2	0	1	4
3	Tokelau	3	1	0	2	2
4	Niue	3	0	0	3	0

1990

Tokelau	26 – 16	Niue

Nuku'alofa, Tonga

1990

Western Samoa	42 – 8	Tonga

Nuku'alofa, Tonga

1990

Western Samoa	66 – 8	Tokelau

Nuku'alofa, Tonga

1990

Tonga	58 – 4	Niue

Nuku'alofa, Tonga

1990

Western Samoa	52 – 2	Niue

Nuku'alofa, Tonga

1990

Tonga	26 – 10	Tokelau

Nuku'alofa, Tonga

=== Finals ===
Semifinals
1	NZ Māori	32
2	Tonga	20
1	Western Samoa	26
2	Australian Aboriginies	22

Finals
NZ Māori	18
Western Samoa	26

==== Semi-finals ====
1990

Western Samoa	26 – 22	Australian Aboriginies

Nuku'alofa, Tonga

1990

NZ Māori	32 – 20	Tonga

Nuku'alofa, Tonga

==== Final ====
31 October 1990

Western Samoa	26 – 18	NZ Māori

Nuku'alofa, Tonga
