= Norfolk Island national rugby league team =

Norfolk Island
Team information
- Nickname: Islanders; Pine Trees
- Governing body: Australian Rugby League Commission
- Region: Asia-Pacific Rugby League Confederation
- Home stadium: Norfolk Island Central School Oval

Team results
- First game
- Māori 84-8 Norfolk Island
- First international
- American Samoa 94-2 Norfolk Island (Davies Park, Huntly, New Zealand October 1992)
- Biggest defeat
- American Samoa 94-2 Norfolk Island (Davies Park, Huntly, New Zealand October 1992)

The Norfolk Island national rugby league team (or the Pine Trees) is the representative side of Norfolk Island in rugby league football.

In the 1990s there were three senior teams on Norfolk Island, but by 2017 a lack of players meant that rugby league was only played as a junior sport. On the Rugby League International Federation website, the governing body for the sport (Norfolk Island Rugby League) was classified as an "observer nation" until 2019, when membership was changed to "pending".

== 1992 Pacific Cup ==
Norfolk Island participated in the 1992 Pacific Cup as members of the second pool, pitting them against the New Zealand Māori team, Australian Aborigines, American Samoa, and Tokelau. However, Norfolk Island failed to win a single game in the tournament, scoring 20 points in their 4 games, while conceding 296 points.

1992 Pacific Cup team

1992 Pacific Cup squad – Shaun Goudie (c), Matthew Reeves (vc), Terry Jope, Brendan Christian, Brent Singer, Brendon Cook, Jason Richards, Dylan Menzies, Peter Yager, Jeff Singer, Mickey Sanders, Darren Nicolai, George Nebauer, Kerry Nicholson, Shane Schmitz, John Adams, Ian Kiernan, Paul Dodds, Darren Trickey, Hayden Evans, Brendan King, Brian Buffett, Edan Mackie, Neil Christian and Brentt Jones. Mal Snell (coach), Paul Christian (liaison office) and John Moochie Christian (first aid).

== Results ==
Date	Opponent	Score	Competition	Venue
19 October 1992	Māori	8 – 84	1992 Pacific Cup	Carlaw Park, Auckland
21 October 1992	Australian Aborigines	2 – 72	1992 Pacific Cup	Carlaw Park, Auckland
24 October 1992	American Samoa	2 – 92	1992 Pacific Cup	Davies Park, Huntly
26 October 1992	Tokelau	8 – 44	1992 Pacific Cup	Jubilee Park, Whangārei

== See also ==
- Sport in Norfolk Island
- Rugby league in Australia

== Sources ==
- Rugby League Gazette March/April 2003
