= New Caledonia national rugby league team =

New Caledonia

Team information
- Governing body: Fédération Française de Rugby à Treize
- Region: Oceania
- Home stadium: Stade Numa-Daly Magenta

Uniforms
First colours

Team results
- First international
- Greece 58 - 8 New Caledonia (6 March 2004)
- Biggest win
- Never won a fixture
- Biggest defeat
- Samoa 76 - 0 New Caledonia (Apia, Samoa; 20 October 2004)

The New Caledonia rugby league team represents the French territory of New Caledonia at rugby league football and has been participating in international competition since 2003. Rugby League in New Caledonia is run under the auspices of the French Rugby League Federation, the Fédération Française de Rugby à Treize.

Rugby League in New Caledonia started with the defection of dissatisfied rugby union clubs. In 2004, New Caledonia hosted a tour by the Australian Universities Rugby League team.

In August 2003 New Caledonia travelled to Australia to play their first international rugby league game against Greece at Norford Park, Sydney. New Caledonia put in a respectable performance for a new league playing nation on tour against a Greek side who had many Australian players in their ranks. It took New Caledonia 32 minutes to cross the line but eventually Greece ran away with the game 26 - 10.

March 2004 saw the touring Greek side visit New Caledonia to assist with League development in the pacific area. In the one-off game played at Paitai Stadium in front of over 1200 spectators, New Caledonia were no match for a Greek side with the likes of Steve Georgallis in the ranks. The final score was 56 - 8 to the Greeks.

In October 2004 New Caledonia entered the Pacific Cup competition. They were grouped with Samoa and American Samoa. New Caledonia suffered some heavy defeats and did not progress into the finals.

New Caledonia were scheduled to take part in the 2006 Pacific Cup. For unknown reasons they pulled out of the tournament one week before it was due to start. They were subsequently replaced by Tokelau.

Dimitri Pelo who represented France in the 2008 Rugby League World Cup was originally from New Caledonia.

The Pacific nation gets plenty of exposure to Rugby League via NRL and International games that are beamed into the Pacific via free to Air TV. The recent Rugby League World Cup will hopefully provide more funding to assist with the continued development of the sport in the pacific.

== Results ==
=== 2003 ===
- Greece 26-10 New Caledonia (August)

=== 2004 ===
- Greece 58-8 New Caledonia (6 March)

==== 2004 Pacific Cup ====
- Samoa 76-0 New Caledonia (20 October)
- American Samoa 62-6 New Caledonia (23 October)
