= 1988 Pacific Cup =

- Number of teams: 6
- Host country: Western Samoa
- Winner: Māori (4th title)
- Matches played: 11

The 1988 Pacific Cup was the fourth edition of the Pacific Cup, a rugby league tournament held between Pacific teams. The tournament was hosted by Western Samoa and eventually won by the New Zealand Māori side, who defeated Western Samoa 26–16 in the final.

== Squads ==
- The Cook Islands included Denvour Johnston.
- Coached by Richard Bolton, the New Zealand Māori squad included Morvin Edwards, captain Barry Harvey, Kelly Shelford, Mark Woods and Tawera Nikau.
- Tonga included John Fifita, captain Duane Mann and Dick Uluave.
- Western Samoa included Paddy Tuimavave, Hitro Okesene and captain Olsen Filipaina.

== Results ==
=== Group 1 ===
	Team	Pld	W	D	L	PF	PA	PD	Pts
1	Western Samoa	2	2	0	0	92	34	58	4
2	Cook Islands	2	1	0	1	35	62	-27	2
3	Tokelau	2	0	0	2	28	59	-31	0

1988

Cook Islands	19 - 10	Tokelau

Western Samoa

1988

Western Samoa	52 - 16	Cook Islands

Western Samoa

1988

Western Samoa	40 - 18	Tokelau

Western Samoa

=== Group 2 ===
	Team	Pld	W	D	L	PF	PA	PD	Pts
1	Māori	2	2	0	0	84	26	58	4
2	Tonga	2	1	0	1	54	56	-2	2
3	American Samoa	2	0	0	2	24	80	-56	0

1988

Māori	42 - 10	American Samoa

Western Samoa

1988

Tonga	38 - 14	American Samoa

Western Samoa

1988

Māori	42 - 16	Tonga

Western Samoa

=== Finals ===
Semifinals
1	NZ Māori	70
2	Cook Islands	20
1	Western Samoa	40
2	Tonga	30

Finals
NZ Māori	26
Western Samoa	16
Third place
Tonga	19
Cook Islands	6

==== Fifth place play off ====
1988

Tokelau	26 - 16	American Samoa
Tries: Aloisio (2), Peleti, Isaac, Faraimo, Kapa; Goals: Koloi		Tries: Ulia, Amituanai, Tumama; Goals: Ao (2)

Western Samoa

==== Semi-finals ====
1988

Western Samoa	40 - 30	Tonga
Tries: Vili (2), Setefano, Macheche, Taogaga, Papalii, Alaimoana; Goals: Laulu (6)		Tries: Halafihi, Uluave, Fifita, Mafi, Halalilo; Goals: Halalilo (5)

Western Samoa

1988

Māori	70 - 20	Cook Islands
Tries: Makoare (5), Edwards (2), Henare (2), Nahu (2), Aramoana, Woods; Goals: O'Shea (6), Nahu (3)		Tries: McAlister, Rea, Magatogai; Goals: Koteka (4)

Western Samoa

==== Third place play off ====
1988

Tonga	19 - 6	Cook Islands

Western Samoa

==== Final ====
1988

Māori	26 - 16	Western Samoa

Western Samoa
Attendance: 4500
Player of the Match: Kelly Makoare
