= Papua New Guinea national rugby league team =

Papua New Guinea

Team information
- Nickname: The Kumuls
- Governing body: PNGRFL
- Region: Asia-Pacific
- Head coach: Jason Demetriou
- Captain: Rhyse Martin
- Most caps: Nene Macdonald (22)
- Top try-scorer: Nene Macdonald (13)
- Top point-scorer: Rhyse Martin (126)
- Home stadium: National Football Stadium
- IRL ranking: 6th

Uniforms
First colours	Second colours

Team results
- First game
- England 40–12 Papua New Guinea (Port Moresby, Papua New Guinea; 6 July 1975)
- Biggest win
- Papua New Guinea 64–0 United States (Port Moresby, Papua New Guinea; 12 November 2017)
- Biggest defeat
- Australia 82–0 Papua New Guinea (Townsville, Australia; 7 October 2000)
- World Cup
- Appearances: 7 (first time in 1985–1988)
- Best result: Quarterfinals (2000, 2017, 2021)

The Papua New Guinea national rugby league team represents Papua New Guinea in the sport of rugby league football.

In Papua New Guinea, rugby league is a highly popular sport and is regarded as the country's national sport. The national side are known as the Kumuls ("birds-of-paradise" in Tok Pisin).

== History ==
Rugby league in Papua New Guinea was first played in the late forties; it was introduced to the nation by Australian soldiers stationed there during and after the Second World War. Papua New Guinea were admitted to the game's International Federation in 1974. On 6 July 1975, at Lloyd Robson Oval, in Port Moresby the Kumuls played their first ever international. They were beaten 40-12 by England. The English team were en route to Australia and New Zealand to fulfil away fixtures during the 1975 World Cup.

They first entered the Rugby League World Cup for the 1985-88 competition, though it was not until 2000 that they won away from home. In 1987 The Kumuls staged their first full test playing tour of Britain, after playing BARLA opposition in 1979. The 1987 Tour had The Kumuls play both BARLA and for the first Professional opposition.

On Tuesday 20 October 1987, Cumbria met Papua New Guinea before a crowd of 3,750 at the Recreation Ground, Whitehaven. Cumbria won 22–4. Four days later Papua New Guinea played a Test which was also a World Cup match against Great Britain. They lost the test 42–0 at Central Park, Wigan.

During the 1988 Great Britain Lions tour of Australasia a Test match was played at Port Moresby which like the match at Wigan in 1987 was a World Cup match. Which they also lost 42-22. Later that year Papua New Guinea played a World Cup match against Australia in Wagga Wagga, the Kangaroos recording a then international record winning margin of 62 points with a 70–8 win. Australian winger Michael O'Connor crossed for four tries and kicked seven goals for a personal points haul of 30, which could have been 44 had he not missed seven kicks at goal. In 1990 Papua New Guinea played host to a touring Great Britain, the series ended in a 1–1 draw.

On Sunday 27 October 1991, Papua New Guinea met Wales at Vetch Field, Swansea. Roared on by a fervent crowd of 11,422; Wales won by a record 68-0 margin, scoring thirteen tries. Papua New Guinea never recovered and lost all five matches in Britain, conceding 232 points in the process, and won only one of their four matches in France.

Papua New Guinea wound up their 1991 tour of Europe with a World Cup rated Test match against France, which was played on Sunday 24 November at the Stade Albert Domec, Carcassonne. Despite Papua New Guinea leading 8–4 at half-time; France defeated their visitors 28–14.

The Kumuls hosted Australia for a two test series in October 1991 (won 2-0 by the Kangaroos), and also hosted Great Britain during the 1992 Lions tour of Australasia.

Papua New Guinea travelled to England to compete in the 1995 World Cup under coach Joe Tokam and captain Adrian Lam. In their group was Tonga and New Zealand, against whom they failed to win a match.

In 1996 Bob Bennett, brother of the famous Wayne Bennett, was appointed the Kumuls' coach. Also, in 1996, Adrian Lam captained the 'Papua New Guinea National Rugby League Team' against the Australian Kangaroos (52-6 win to Australia). Bob Bennett coached the 2000 World Cup Kumuls team to the qualification two the pool were the kumuls made it into the top 4 teams in the world so the 2000 World Cup Kumuls team was rated the best kumuls team.

They were granted automatic qualification to the 2008 World Cup but were placed in a pool with the top three teams, Australia, New Zealand and England, and failed to win a match in the tournament.

PNG automatically qualified for the 2021 Rugby League World Cup having reached the quarter-finals of the previous Rugby League World Cup. The 2021 tournament took place in England, the performance is detailed below.

=== 2010 controversy ===
The Papua New Guinea team experienced huge difficulties leading to the 2010 Rugby League Four Nations Tournament, as politicians clashed for control over the game and the governing body, the PNGRFL, was split over issues concerning junior development, the national team and the Papua New Guinea NRL bid. This caused Adrian Lam to retire as head coach of the Kumuls in September 2010 while recently retired captain Stanley Gene, who had never coached a side before, was named his replacement. The governing board were adamant that more Papua New Guinea-based players should be in the squad, and fewer Australia-based players should be picked. In early October the squad was announced for the tournament and consisted of 12 PNG-based players with captain Paul Aiton being the only NRL player. Whilst the Australian team for the tournament was worth an estimated A$10 million, local newspapers calculated the Kumuls value at around A$670,000.

Despite the Australian media treating the defeat of the Papua New Guinean team as a mere formality, with the team having odds of 125–1 to win the tournament, the players and journalists at home were positive that the Kumuls could make a lasting impression in the tournament. After their first up 42–0 defeat against Australia, the team's enthusiasm and crunching tackles were praised, but ball control and creativity let the team down hugely. However the team faced much more criticism after their 76-12 thrashing suffered at the hands of New Zealand, with fans angry at the poor display from the players and some questioning the credentials of new coach Stanley Gene. Days after the match a broader look at the sport in the country occurred with one assessment concluding that rugby league was poorly managed and former PNG great Marcus Bai called on clubs to supply a greater number of representative standard players especially from the New Guinea Islands region which had supplied five of this year's team. The way politics had made its way into the governing of the sport was also condemned.

=== 2015 Pacific Rugby League Test ===
In May 2015, Papua New Guinea took on Fiji in the 2015 Melanesian Cup at Cbus Super Stadium. The International was part of a triple header which also included the Polynesian Cup, between Samoa and Tonga, and the Junior Kangaroos against the Junior Kiwis. The Kumuls never really troubled the Fijians after handling errors and poor decisions led to the Bati easily winning the inaugural Melanesian Cup by 22–10.

=== 2016 Pacific Rugby League Test ===
In May 2016, Papua New Guinea took on Fiji in the 2016 Melanesian Cup at Pirtek Stadium. The International was part of a triple header which also included the Polynesian Cup, between Samoa and Tonga, and the Junior Kangaroos against the Junior Kiwis. In this year's test, the Kumuls had more experienced players and it paid off. Despite being in a similar situation with the half time score, they managed to make a miraculous comeback not many saw coming, to record their first win 24–22 on away shores since the 2000 World Cup.

=== 2017 Pacific Rugby League Test ===
The PNG Kumuls won their second consecutive Pacific Cup test victory with a 32–22 victory over the Cook Islands at Campbelltown Stadium in Sydney, Australia.

=== 2017 Rugby League World Cup ===
The PNG Kumuls won all their pool games in Port Moresby before losing to England in Melbourne in the quarter-final of the 2017 RLWC.

=== 2018 Pacific Rugby League Test ===
The PNG Kumuls won their third consecutive Ox & Palm Pacific Cup test victory with a 26–14 victory over Fiji Bati at Campbelltown Stadium in Sydney, Australia.

=== 2019 Oceania Cup and GB Lions Tour ===
The PNG Kumuls lost both their 2019 Oceania Cup (rugby league) test matches with a 24–6 loss to Toa Samoa at Leichhardt Oval in Sydney, Australia and a 22–20 loss to Fiji Bati in Christchurch, New Zealand . The Kumuls ended the season on a high defeating the Great Britain Lions 28–10 in Port Moresby.

=== 2022 Pacific Rugby League Test ===
The Kumuls defeated a full strength Fiji Bati 24-14 on June 25 at Campbelltown Stadium.

=== 2022 Rugby League World Cup ===
The PNG Kumuls were based in Warrington for the 2021 RLWC. The World Cup will be held between October 15 and November 19. Kumuls coach Stanley Tepend was guided by his mentor/ Coaching Director Shane Flanagan. The PM's XIII lost to Australia PM's XIII on September 25 at Suncorp Stadium as part of both teams world cup preparations. The Kumuls bowed out in the quarterfinals after losing to hosts, England.

== Players ==
=== Current squad ===
The PNG Kumuls squad for the 2026 Rugby League World Cup was announced on 7 October 2026.

Jersey numbers in the table reflect team selection for the Round 3 match against England.

Statistics in this table are compiled from the website, Rugby League Project. Tallies in the table include the match versus England on 30 October 2026.

J#	Player	Age	Position(s)	Kumuls						Club	Club Matches
J#	Player	Age	Position(s)	Dbt	M	T	G	F	P	Club	Tier 1	Tier 2
1	Zac Laybutt	24	Fullback, Centre	2023	8	3	6	0	24	North Queensland Cowboys	42	31
2	Robert Derby	24	Wing	2022	11	9	0	0	36	North Queensland Cowboys	20	55
3	Josh Feledy	22	Centre	2026	1	0	0	0	0	Manly Warringah Sea Eagles	15	0
16	Robert Mathias	25	Centre	2024	5	1	0	0	4	London Broncos	0	44
5	Dudley Dotoi	23	Wing	2025	4	2	0	0	8	Townsville Blackhawks	0	54
6	Gairo Voro	23	Five-eighth	2025	5	3	0	0	12	London Broncos	0	45
7	Bailey Biondi-Odo	24	Halfback	2026	3	2	0	0	8	Townsville Blackhawks	17	75
8	Epel Kapinias	28	Prop	2022	9	4	0	0	16	London Broncos	0	91
13	Liam Horne	28	Lock, Hooker	2022	10	0	0	0	0	Leigh Leopards	76	51
18	Valentine Richard	29	Prop	2023	10	1	0	0	4	Central Queensland Capras	0	71
11	Rhyse Martin	33	Second-row	2014	24	8	82	0	196	Hull Kingston Rovers	186	83
12	Nixon Putt	31	Second-row	2017	18	6	0	0	24	Central Queensland Capras	7	166
10	Luca Moretti	26	Lock, Prop	2026	2	0	0	0	0	Parramatta Eels	52	38
14	Finley Glare	23	Halfback	2025	5	1	0	0	4	London Broncos	0	55
15	Jacob Taulani	22	Second-row	2026	1	0	0	0	0	Newcastle Knights	0	23
4	Nene Macdonald	32	Centre	2013	24	15	0	0	60	St Helens R.F.C.	161	45
17	Sanny Wabo	27	Fullback	2026	1	0	0	0	0	Papua New Guinea Hunters	0	64
22	Alex Max	—	Centre	—	0	0	0	0	0	London Broncos	0	47
19	Zev John	28	Second-row, Prop	2019	1	0	0	0	0	Central Queensland Capras	0	88
20	Morea Morea	25	Fullback	2024	5	3	0	0	12	London Broncos	0	47
21	Rodrick Tai	27	Centre, Wing	2022	10	2	0	0	8	Central Queensland Capras	33	56
9	Edwin Ipape	27	Hooker	2019	13	3	0	0	12	Leigh Leopards	92	33
IJ	Jack de Belin	35	Lock, Prop	2023	10	0	0	0	0	Parramatta Eels	270	6
–	Khaiya Waiembi	—	Prop	2026	1	0	0	0	0	Central Queensland Capras	0	45
–	Sylvester Namo	26	Second-row	2022	10	3	0	0	12	Papua New Guinea Hunters	20	56
–	Kyle Laybutt	31	Five-eighth, Lock	2019	14	2	10	0	28	Townsville Blackhawks	2	125

Notes:

- Alex Max, Kyle Laybutt and Jacob Taulani were named as shadow players.
- Five members of the squad played in the second-tier 2026 RFL Championship: Glare (19 matches), Kapinias (17), Mathias (13), Morea (15), and Voro (25). All five played in the championship winning team, the London Broncos, which was also coached by Jason Demetriou.
- Four members of the squad played in the top-tier 2026 Super League season: Horne (28), Ipape (22), Macdonald (12), and Martin (22).
- Five members of the squad played in the 2026 NRL season: de Belin (18), Derby (2), Feledy (12), Laybutt (20), and Moretti (18).
  - Four of the five also played in the second-tier state competitions: Derby (13) in the Queensland Cup and de Belin (5), Feledy (7), and Moretti (2) in the NSW Cup.
- For nine members of the squad, their highest-level club football during 2026 was in the second-tier state competitions. All nine played in the Queensland Cup: Biondi-Odo (17), Dotoi (18), John (13), Namo (8), Putt (18), Richard (22), Tai (22), Wabo (16), and Waiembi (20).

== Records ==
Below is the list of Papua New Guinea's individual record holders as of 21 October 2024.

- **Bold**- denotes that the player is still active.

=== Most capped players ===
#	Name	Career	Caps
1	**Rhyse Martin**	2014-2025	20
1	**Nene Macdonald**	2013-2025	20
3	Max Tiri	1990-1996	16
3	Stanley Gene	1994-2008	16
3	John Wilshere	2000-2009	16
3	Paul Aiton	2007-2017	16
7	David Mead	2008-2022	15
8	Justin Olam	2016-2022	14
8	Bal Numapo	1984-1990	14
8	Kyle Laybutt	2019-2024	14
8	**Lachlan Lam**	2017-2025	14
8	**Nixon Putt**	2017-2025	14

=== Top try scorers ===
#	Name	Career	Tries
1	**Nene Macdonald**	2013-2024	13
2	David Mead	2008-2022	11
3	**Robert Derby**	2022-2025	8
4	Menzie Yere	2001-2013	7
4	Justin Olam	2016-2022	7

=== Top points scorers ===
#	Name	Career	Points	Tries	Goals	Field Goals
1	**Rhyse Martin**	2014-2023	126	5	53	0
2	John Wilshere	2000-2009	102	5	41	0
3	Bal Numapo	1984-1990	53	4	18	1
4	David Mead	2008-2022	40	10	0	0
5	Dairi Kovae	1986-1988	38	5	9	0

== Competitive record ==
=== Overall ===
Below is the list of Papua New Guinea's international head-to-head record as of 22 October 2026.

Country	Matches	Won	Drawn	Lost	Win percentage	For	Aga	Diff
Australia	10	0	0	10	0%	62	528	–466
Australian Aboriginies	3	0	0	3	0%	40	118	–78
Cook Islands	9	9	0	0	100%	352	142	+210
England	5	0	0	5	0%	56	190	–134
Fiji	17	12	0	5	70.59%	425	279	+146
France	14	4	1	9	28.57%	249	281	–32
Great Britain	9	2	0	7	22.22%	146	298	–152
Ireland	1	1	0	0	100%	14	6	+8
Lebanon	1	1	0	0	100%	42	18	+24
New Zealand	19	1	0	18	5.26	238	866	–628
(Māori people) New Zealand Maori	12	2	0	10	16.67%	269	396	–127
New Zealand Residents	2	0	0	2	0%	24	42	–18
Samoa	3	0	0	3	0%	28	88	–60
Scotland	1	1	0	0	100%	38	20	+18
South Africa	1	1	0	0	100%	16	0	+16
Tonga	9	7	1	1	77.78%	322	179	+143
United States	1	1	0	0	100%	64	0	+64
Wales	5	2	0	3	40.00%	104	146	–42
Total	122	44	2	76	36.07%	2,489	3,597	–1,108

Notes:

- The tally for matches against Tonga includes a 1990 match between Papua New Guinea and the Friendly Islands.

=== World Cup ===
World Cup record
Year	Round	Position	GP	W	L	D
1954–1977	did not participate					
1985–88	Fourth place	4/5	8	2	6	0
1989–92	Fifth place	5/5	8	0	8	0
(England) (Wales) 1995	Group stage	6/10	2	0	1	1
(England) (France) (Ireland) (Scotland) (Wales) 2000	Quarter-finals	6/16	4	3	1	0
(Australia) 2008	Group stage	10/10	3	0	3	0
(England) (Wales) 2013	Group stage	13/14	3	0	3	0
(Australia) (New Zealand) (Papua New Guinea) 2017	Quarter-finals	5/14	4	3	1	0
(England) 2021	Quarter-finals	7/16	4	3	1	0
(Australia) (Papua New Guinea) 2026	Group stage	6/10	3	1	2	0
Total	0 Titles		39	12	26	1

=== Tri-Nations / Four Nations ===
Tri-Nations / Four Nations record
Year	Round	Position	GP	W	L	D
1999–2006	did not participate					
(Australia) (New Zealand) 2010	Fourth place	4/4	3	0	3	0
2011–2016	did not participate					
Total	0 Titles	1/9	3	0	3	0

=== Pacific Cup ===
Pacific Cup record
Year	Round	Position	GP	W	L	D
(Papua New Guinea) 1975	Runners-up	2/4	4	2	2	0
(New Zealand) 1977	Third place	3/5	4	2	2	0
(Cook Islands) 1986	did not participate					
(Samoa) 1986	did not participate					
(Tonga) 1990	Group stage	5/8	3	1	2	0
(New Zealand) 1992	did not participate					
(Fiji) 1994	did not participate					
(New Zealand) 1997	Third place	3/6	4	2	2	0
(New Zealand) 2004	did not participate					
(New Zealand) 2006	did not participate					
(Papua New Guinea) 2009	Champions	1/5	2	2	0	0
Total	1 Title	5/12	6	4	2	0

=== Margins and streaks ===
Biggest winning margins

Margin	Score	Opponent	Venue	Date
64	64–0	United States	Oil Search National Football Stadium	12 Nov 2017
44	50–6	Wales	Oil Search National Football Stadium	28 Oct 2017
44	54–10	Fiji	Lloyd Robson Oval	22 July 2009
42	54–12	Tonga	Lloyd Robson Oval	18 Oct 1998
37	56–19	Tonga	Hubert Murray	8 July 1996
36	36–0	Wales	Eco-Power Stadium	31 Oct 2022
36	46–10	Cook Islands	Santos National Football Stadium	15 Oct 2023
32	50–18	Fiji	Santos National Football Stadium	1 Nov 2025

Biggest losing margins

Margin	Score	Opponent	Venue	Date
82	0–82	Australia	Dairy Farmers Stadium	7 Oct 2000
68	0–68	Wales	Vetch Field	27 Oct 1991
64	12–76	New Zealand	International Stadium	30 Oct 2010
64	0–64	New Zealand	Manawatu	11 Oct 1996
58	6–64	Samoa	Santos National Football Stadium	24 Oct 2026
56	2–58	Australia	Danny Leahy	6 Oct 1991
42	6–48	New Zealand	Skilled Park	1 Nov 2008
42	12–54	New Zealand	CommBank Stadium	10 Nov 2024
42	0–42	Australia	Parramatta Stadium	24 Oct 2010
40	6–46	England	DW Stadium	5 Nov 2022
40	6–46	Australia	Dairy Farmers Stadium	9 Nov 2008

== Attendance records ==
=== Highest all-time attendances ===
Attendance	Opposing team	Venue	Tournament
44,324	England	Eden Park, Auckland	2010 Rugby League Four Nations
23,179	England	Wigan Athletic Stadium, Wigan	2021 Rugby League World Cup Quarter-Final
21,000	Australia	Willows Sports Complex, Townsville	2000 – Test Match
18,271	Cook Islands	Campbelltown Sports Ground, Sydney	2017 Cook Islands vs Papua New Guinea
18,180	New Zealand	Headingley, Leeds	2013 Rugby League World Cup

=== Highest attendances per opponent ===
Attendance	Opposing team	Venue	Tournament
44,324	England	Eden Park, Auckland	2010 Rugby League Four Nations
21,000	Australia	Willows Sports Complex, Townsville	2000 – Test Match
18,271	Cook Islands	Campbelltown Sports Ground, Sydney	2017 Cook Islands vs Papua New Guinea
18,180	New Zealand	Headingley, Leeds	2013 Rugby League World Cup
17,802	Fiji	Campbelltown Sports Ground, Sydney	2018 Papua New Guinea vs Fiji
16,000	France	Lloyd Robson Oval, Port Moresby	1981 French tour of Australasia
15,008	Samoa	PNG Football Stadium, Port Moresby	2026 Rugby League World Cup
14,800	Wales	PNG Football Stadium, Port Moresby	2017 Rugby League World Cup
14,800	Ireland	PNG Football Stadium, Port Moresby	2017 Rugby League World Cup
14,800	United States	PNG Football Stadium, Port Moresby	2017 Rugby League World Cup
14,000	Māori	Lloyd Robson Oval, Port Moresby	1975 Pacific Cup
12,107	Great Britain	Lloyd Robson Oval, Port Moresby	1988 Great Britain Lions tour - Test Match
11,624	Lebanon	PNG Football Stadium, Port Moresby	2026 Rugby League World Cup
10,409	Tonga	Langtree Park, St Helens	2021 Rugby League World Cup
5,200	Aborigines	Barlow Park, Cairns	
4,313	South Africa	Stade Ernest Wallon, Toulouse	2000 Rugby League World Cup
1,412	Scotland	Post Office Road, Featherstone	Test Match

=== Highest attendances per opponent in Papua New Guinea ===
Attendance	Opposing team	Venue	Tournament
17,000	Australia	Lloyd Robson Oval, Port Moresby	1986 Kangaroo tour – Test Match
16,000	France	Lloyd Robson Oval, Port Moresby	1981 French tour of Australasia
15,008	Samoa	PNG Football Stadium, Port Moresby	2026 Rugby League World Cup
15,000	New Zealand	Lloyd Robson Oval, Port Moresby	1986 New Zealand Australasian tour – 2nd Test
15,000	Fiji	Lloyd Robson Oval, Port Moresby	2011 Papua New Guinea vs Fiji
14,800	Wales	PNG Football Stadium, Port Moresby	2017 Rugby League World Cup
14,800	Ireland	PNG Football Stadium, Port Moresby	2017 Rugby League World Cup
14,800	United States	PNG Football Stadium, Port Moresby	2017 Rugby League World Cup
14,000	Māori	Lloyd Robson Oval, Port Moresby	1975 Pacific Cup
12,107	Great Britain	Lloyd Robson Oval, Port Moresby	1988 Great Britain Lions tour - Test Match
12,000	England	Lloyd Robson Oval, Port Moresby	England 1975 Rugby League World Cup tour
11,624	Lebanon	PNG Football Stadium, Port Moresby	2026 Rugby League World Cup
9,813	Tonga	Lloyd Robson Oval, Port Moresby	2009 Pacific Cup

== IRL Rankings ==
IRL Men's World Rankings
Official rankings as of August 2026
Rank	Change	Team	Pts %
1	Steady	Australia	100
2	Steady	New Zealand	82
3	Steady	Tonga	70
4	Steady	Samoa	56
5	Steady	England	54
6	Steady	Papua New Guinea	47
7	Steady	Fiji	34
8	▲1	Cook Islands	24
9	▲2	Netherlands	23
10	▲2	Ukraine	21
11	▼3	France	21
12	▼2	Serbia	20
13	Steady	Wales	18
14	Steady	Ireland	17
15	Steady	Greece	14
16	Steady	Malta	14
17	▲12	Canada	13
18	▼1	Italy	11
19	▼1	Jamaica	9
20	▲7	Scotland	8
21	▲1	United States	8
22	▼3	Poland	7
23	▼3	Lebanon	7
24	▼1	Germany	7
25	▼1	Czech Republic	6
26	▼5	Norway	6
27	▼2	Chile	5
28	▲2	Philippines	5
29	▼1	South Africa	4
30	Steady	Brazil	3
31	Steady	Morocco	3
32	▲1	Argentina	3
33	▲2	Ghana	2
34	▲2	Kenya	2
35	▼1	Montenegro	2
36	▲1	Nigeria	2
37	▼5	North Macedonia	1
38	Steady	Albania	1
39	Steady	Turkey	1
40	Steady	Bulgaria	1
41	Steady	Cameroon	0
42	Steady	Japan	0
43	Steady	Spain	0
44	Steady	Colombia	0
45	Steady	Russia	0
46	Steady	El Salvador	0
47	Steady	Bosnia and Herzegovina	0
48	Steady	Hong Kong	0
49	Steady	Solomon Islands	0
50	Steady	Vanuatu	0
51	Steady	Hungary	0
52	Steady	Latvia	0
53	Steady	Denmark	0
54	Steady	Belgium	0
55	Steady	Estonia	0
56	Steady	Sweden	0
57	Steady	Niue	0
Complete rankings at www.internationalrugbyleague.com

== Other Papua New Guinean teams ==
- PNG Prime Minister's XIII - Development side consisting of players from the Papua New Guinea National Rugby League competition. In recent years, players from the National Rugby League, Intrust Super Cup, English Super League and English Championship have also been selected to play the Australian PM's XIII.
- PNG President XIII - PNGRFL 'select' usually playing another development side like Junior Kangaroos or New Zealand A. Rarely used to play national sides.
- PNG Residents- Papua New Guinea development side made up of solely local players. Regularly playing matches with the Junior Kangaroos, New Zealand Māoris and even national sides.
- Papua New Guinea Kundus - Papua New Guinea Junior U/19 schoolboys side.

== See also ==
- Rugby league in Papua New Guinea
- World Cup
