= Avarua Tereora Stadium =

Multi-purpose stadium in Avarua, Cook Islands

- Interactive map of Avarua Tereora Stadium
- Location: Avarua, Rarotonga, Cook Islands
- Coordinates: 21°12′21″S 159°48′25″W
- Owner: CISNOC
- Capacity: 5,000
- Surface: Grass
- Record attendance: 5,000 (1986 Pacific Games)

Construction
- Opened: 1984

The Tereora Stadium also known as the National Stadium is a multi-purpose stadium in Avarua, Cook Islands. It is currently used mostly for rugby matches. The stadium holds 5,000 people and was originally built in 1984/85. The stadium was upgraded in early 1986 so it could host both the 1986 Pacific Games and the rugby league 1986 Pacific Cup. The Stadium is managed by the National Stadium Trust Board made up of individuals from CISNOC, the Private Sector and Government. The Stadium Trust Board employs a full-time manager, Mr Rae Dyer. It is the home stadium for the Cook Islands national rugby league team.
