= Tokelau national rugby league team =

Tokelau

Team information
- Governing body: Tokelau Rugby League
- Region: Asia-Pacific
- Head coach: Mike Felise
- Captain: Isaac Misky
- Home stadium: Hemoana Stadium

Uniforms
First colours

Team results
- First international
- Western Samoa 34 - 12 Tokelau (Rarotonga, Cook Islands; 1986)
- Biggest win
- Tokelau 44 - 8 Norfolk Island (Auckland, New Zealand; October 1992)
- Biggest defeat
- Tonga 62 - 0 Tokelau (Auckland, New Zealand; October 2006)

The Tokelau national rugby league team represents Tokelau in rugby league football and first participated in international competition in 1986.

Tokelau has participated five times in the Pacific Cup: in 1986, 1988, 1990, 1992 and 2006.

In December 2011, the Tokelau National Sports Coordinator contacted the Rugby League International Federation (RLIF) to express their ambitions to form a Tokelau Rugby League Association (TRLA) with the initial goal to obtain membership of the Asia-Pacific Rugby League Confederation (APRLC). In 2015, the Asia-Pacific website listed Tokelau's membership status as pending.

== Notable players ==
- Sam Panapa: represented Tokelau at the 1986 Pacific Cup and named in the team of the tournament

== Results ==
Note: Tokelau score is given first.

Date	Opponent	Score	Tournament	Ref.
27 October 1986	Western Samoa	12–34	1986 Pacific Cup	
31 October 1986	Tonga	22–26	1986 Pacific Cup	
18 October 1988	Cook Islands	10–19	1988 Pacific Cup	
22 October 1988	Western Samoa	18–40	1988 Pacific Cup	
24 October 1988	American Samoa	26–16	1988 Pacific Cup	
21 October 1990	Niue	26–16	1990 Pacific Cup	
24 October 1990	Western Samoa	8–66	1990 Pacific Cup	
26 October 1990	Tonga	10–26	1990 Pacific Cup	
17 October 1992	American Samoa	18–26	1992 Pacific Cup	
19 October 1992	Australian Aborigines	18–46	1992 Pacific Cup	
24 October 1992	Māori	18–34	1992 Pacific Cup	
26 October 1992	Norfolk Island	44–8	1992 Pacific Cup	
23 February 2006	Tonga	0–62	2006 Pacific Cup	
2 March 2006	Māori	4–64	2006 Pacific Cup	
5 March 2006	Samoa	34–28	2006 Pacific Cup	

=== Nines ===
Date	Opponent	Score	Tournament	Ref.
8 July 2019	Cook Islands	4–22	2019 Pacific Games	
8 July 2019	Solomon Islands	8–4	2019 Pacific Games	
8 July 2019	Fiji	4–30	2019 Pacific Games	
9 July 2019	Cook Islands	20–22	2019 Pacific Games	
9 July 2019	Solomon Islands	18–24	2019 Pacific Games	

== National stadium ==
Stadium	Capacity	City
Hemoana Stadium	1,000	Nukunonu
