= American Samoa national rugby league team =

National rugby league team representing American Samoa

American Samoa

Team information
- Region: Asia-Pacific
- Home stadium: Veterans Memorial Stadium

Uniforms
First colours

Team results
- First international
- Tonga 38–14 American Samoa (Apia, Samoa; 1988)
- Biggest win
- New Caledonia 6–62 American Samoa (Auckland, New Zealand; 2004)
- Biggest defeat
- Tonga 38–14 American Samoa (Apia, Samoa; 1988)

The American Samoa national rugby league team represents American Samoa at rugby league football and has been participating in international competition since 1988.

== Competitions ==
American Samoa has participated in:

Cabramatta International Nines Rugby League competition/ Sydney: (2008, 2013, 2015)

- Pacific Cup (since 1988)
- World Sevens (1996, 1997; entered the Qualification Tournament in 2003 and 2004) and the VB Sevens in 2005

== All-time record ==
Below is the head-to-head record for the American Samoa as of 10 May 2020.

Opponent	Played	Won	Drawn	Lost	% Won	Year/s	For	Aga	Diff
Australian Aborigines	1	0	0	1	0%	1992	14	32	–18
Cook Islands	2	0	0	2	0%	1994–2004	32	50	–18
Fiji	1	0	0	1	0%	1994	14	16	–2
New Caledonia	1	1	0	0	100%	2004	62	6	+56
Māori	1	0	0	1	0%	1992	12	26	–14
Norfolk Island	1	1	0	0	100%	1992	94	2	+92
Rotuma	1	0	1	0	0%	1994	32	32	0
Samoa	1	0	0	1	0%	1994	10	30	–20
Tokelau	1	1	0	0	100%	1992	26	18	+8
Tonga	1	0	0	1	0%	2004	18	22	–4
Total	11	3	1	7	27.27%	1992–2004	314	234	+80

Winning team given first

=== Cabramatta International 9's Rugby League 2015 ===
- Plate Champions

=== Pacific Cup 2004 ===
- Tonga 22-18 American Samoa (18 October 2004)
- Cook Islands 28-12 American Samoa (20 October 2004)
- American Samoa 62-6 New Caledonia (23 October 2004)

=== Pacific Cup 1998 ===
- American Samoa 40-34 Cook Islands
- American Samoa 54-12 Tokelau
- Tonga 18-16 American Samoa

=== Pacific Cup 1992 ===
- Tokelau 26-18 American Samoa
- New Zealand Māoris 26-12 American Samoa
- American Samoa 94-2 Norfolk Island
- Australia Aborigines 22-10 American Samoa

=== Pacific Cup 1988 ===
- New Zealand Māoris 42-10 American Samoa
- Tonga 38-14 American Samoa

== Notable players ==
- Pita Godinet
- Fui Fui Moi Moi
- Ronaldo Mulitalo
- Hitro Okesene
- Paul Okesene
- Joseph Paulo
- Junior Paulo
- Eddie Pettybourne
- Tui Samoa

== Sevens results ==
=== 2005 VB Sevens ===
- NZ Residents 24-8 American Samoa
- Fiji A 18-16 American Samoa
- American Samoa 32-16 Malta
- Sydney Bulls 28-16 American Samoa

=== 2004 World Sevens Qualifier ===
- Aboriginals v American Samoa
- North Sydney Bears v American Samoa

=== 2003 World Sevens Qualifier ===
- American Samoa 28-16 Italy
- American Samoa 6-18 Newtown Jets
- American Samoa 16-22 New Zealand Māori
