= Tonga national rugby league team =

Tonga

Team information
- Nickname: Mate Ma'a Tonga
- Governing body: Tonga Rugby League XIII
- Region: Asia-Pacific
- Head coach: Kristian Woolf
- Captain: Addin Fonua-Blake & Jason Taumalolo
- Most caps: Tui Lolohea (22)
- Top try-scorer: Daniel Tupou (12)
- Top point-scorer: Isaiya Katoa (67)
- IRL ranking: 3rd

Uniforms
First colours	Second colours

Team results
- First international
- Tonga 34–16 Western Samoa (Rarotonga, Cook Islands; 29 October 1986)
- Biggest win
- Tonga 92-10 Cook Islands (Middlesbrough, England; 31 October 2022)
- Biggest defeat
- New Zealand 74–0 Tonga (Auckland, New Zealand; 23 October 1999)
- World Cup
- Appearances: 5 (first time in 1995)
- Best result: (bronze) Semifinals (2017) (2026)

The Tonga national rugby league team (Tongan: timi līki ʻakapulu fakafonua ʻa Tonga) represents Tonga in rugby league football. The team was formed to compete in the 1986 Pacific Cup, and have competed at seven Rugby League World Cups, starting in 1995 and continuing consecutively until the most recent tournament. Their best result was at the 2017 Rugby League World Cup, where they were semi-finalists.

Formerly administered by the Tonga National Rugby League, the team is now in a state of limbo with administration. They wear a predominantly red uniform with white sides and are associated with the phrase Mate Ma'a Tonga (English: Die for Tonga). They are coached by Australian Kristian Woolf, and captained by Addin Fonua-Blake.

== History ==
Rugby league first gained attention in Tonga when the Pacific Cup was partially held in the country during 1986. After this initial exposure to the Tongan people several clubs began to form or switch from rugby union to rugby league and by 1988 the nation had enough depth in their player pool to begin playing national fixtures and entered the 1988 Pacific Cup competition held in Apia, Samoa. During that Pacific Cup the Tongans played in three fixtures winning a sole match while losing the other two, with their first international victory coming against the American Samoa side a match that ended 38–14.

Over the next two years the national side sporadically played international fixtures but it was not until the 1992 Pacific Cup when they again began playing with some regularity. At the 1992 Cup competition the side showed significant improvement on their previous inaugural cup effort with victories over , Cook Islands, Fiji and the New Zealand Maori. This run of victories earned them a place in the final of the 1992 Pacific Cup against the Western Samoan side but they eventually lost a close fought match by four points 18–14. The following tournament two years later saw the Tongan side show further improvement with several comfortable victories again earning them a spot in final of the Pacific Cup this time against the Fijians who had never defeated the Tongans at that time. The Mate Ma'a were again victorious over Fiji 34–11 and claimed their maiden Pacific Cup title.

During 1995 Tonga qualified for their first World Cup and were seeded in the strong group B with both New Zealand and Papua New Guinea. They narrowly lost to the New Zealand team by a single point and earned a draw against Papua New Guinea.

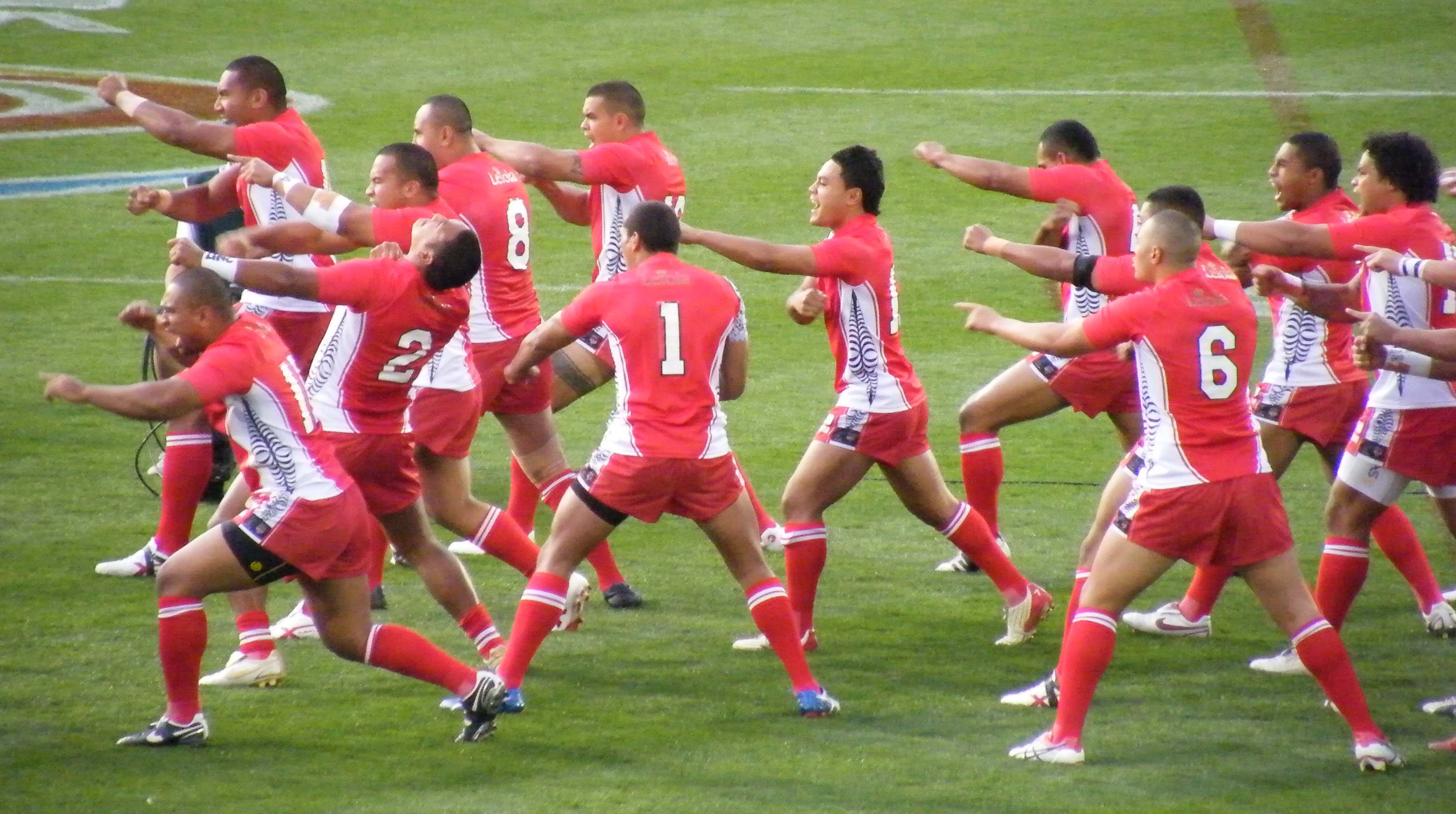
The Tongan team performing the Sipi Tau at the 2008 Rugby League World Cup.

The next four years saw the Tongan side appear in a further Pacific Cup in 1997 and then qualify for the 2000 World Cup with comfortable victories over Cook Islands, Tokelau and American Samoa. Prior to appearing at the 2000 competition the Tongans arranged a friendly fixture against the New Zealand side but lost 74–0.

After the heavy defeat to New Zealand their next international fixture was during their second World Cup where the Tongans were again placed in a group with France, Papua New Guinea again, and South Africa. Tonga faced South Africa in their first match of the tournament where they won 66–18, however they lost to both France and Papua New Guinea meaning the Tongans again failed to make it past the first stage of the tournament.

The Pacific Cup saw the Tongans again qualify for the tournament final with victories over both the Cook Islands and Fiji but the side suffered defeat at the hands of neighbouring Samoa 51–18. 2006 saw the Tongan side re-enter the Pacific Cup where again they performed strongly qualifying for their second consecutive final where this time they reversed their previous effort with a strong victory over Fiji 22–4 giving them their second Pacific Cup title. 2006 continued to be a busy year of international fixtures for the Tongans which saw them gain qualification into the 2008 World Cup after they finished top of their Pacific group ahead of the Cook Islands, Fiji and Samoa and then defeat the Samoans 18–10 in the qualifying final. They also entered the inaugural Federation Shield competition along with England, France and Samoa and eventually finish second. England to face Tonga in League final to the English in the final 32–14 after they had defeated both France and Samoa.

In April 2013, Tonga took on Samoa in the '2013 Pacific Rugby League Test' at Penrith Stadium. The International was created as a World Cup warm-up match. Tonga beat Toa Samoans by 36–4.

Tonga automatically qualified for the 2013 Rugby League World Cup after participating in the 2008 tournament. They took on Scotland, Italy and the Cook Islands in the pool stage. In their first match they took on 'the Scots'. It was a tight and intense rugby league battle, but Scotland won 26–24. Tonga then went on and beat 'the Kukis', 22–16, and Italy, 16–0, but it wasn't enough. Scotland finished the group stage unbeaten, sealing their place in the quarter-final and ending Tonga's World Cup campaign in the process.

In May 2015, Tonga took on Samoa in the 2015 Polynesian Cup at Cbus Super Stadium. The International was part of a triple header which also included the Melanesian Cup, between Papua New Guinea and Fiji, and the Junior Kangaroos against the Junior Kiwis. Samoa beat Mate Ma'a Tonga to win the Polynesian Cup by 18–16.

In October 2015, Tonga took on the Cook Islands in the Asia-Pacific elimination play-off to determine which of the two Asia-Pacific nations qualified for the 2017 Rugby League World Cup. After a tight first half, Mate Ma'a Tonga went on win the match scoring 16 points within the last 20 minutes of the game.

In May 2016, Tonga took on Samoa in the 2016 Polynesian Cup at Pirtek Stadium. The International was part of a triple header which also included the Melanesian Cup, between Papua New Guinea and Fiji, and the Junior Kangaroos against the Junior Kiwis. The match resulted in a 12-point defeat to Samoa in the 2016 Polynesian Cup.

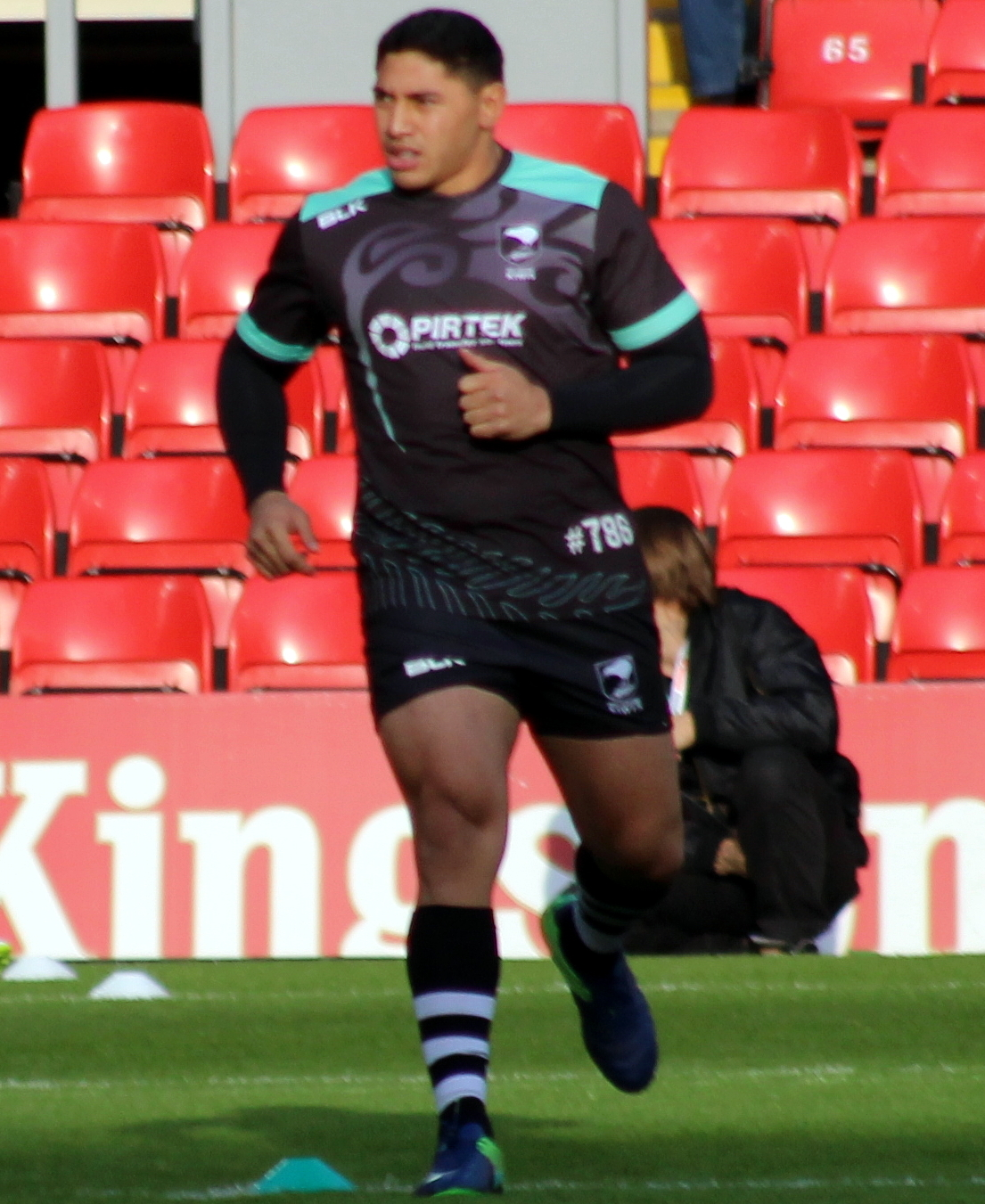
Jason Taumalolo has chosen to represent Tonga instead of New Zealand since 2017.

Tonga fielded its strongest ever team at the 2017 World Cup after Jason Taumalolo and Andrew Fifita chose to represent their Tongan heritage rather than their respective birthplaces, New Zealand and Australia. At the time, they were considered to be among the best forwards in the world. Both players cited a desire to honour family and strengthen the Tongan team as motivating factors for their defections, while Taumalolo's relationship with Tonga head coach Kristian Woolf was also acknowledged. (Note: Woolf had previously coached Taumalolo as head coach of the North Queensland Cowboys' Under-20s team in 2010 and 2011, and as assistant coach of Tonga at the 2013 World Cup.)

In addition, Manu Maʻu declined a likely position in the New Zealand squad, while David Fusitu'a, Solomone Kata, Tuimoala Lolohea, and Sio Siua Taukeiaho dismissed any possibility of a New Zealand re-call in order to represent Tonga. Michael Jennings also committed himself to Tonga after declining an opportunity to represent Fiji.

Tonga quickly became the most heavily backed team in the World Cup, dropping from $81 odds to $17. Entering into the tournament as the 11th ranked team in the world, Tonga comfortably won their opening two group matches, outclassing Scotland 50–4 and Samoa 32–18. In their third and final group match, Tonga upset New Zealand 28–22 after trailing 16–2 at half-time. This marked the first time since the introduction of the tiered-nation system that a tier-two team defeated a tier-one team, and the first time since Wales defeated England 18–16 in 1995 if applied retroactively. Tonga beat Lebanon 24–22 in a hard-fought quarter-final, and then lost 18–20 to England in the semi-final. England were leading 20–0 with 8 minutes remaining until Tonga scored three tries in quick succession, however, a contentious refereeing decision in the last seconds of the game denied them scoring a fourth try and progressing to the World Cup final.

Playing for the Kangaroos is the pinnacle in rugby league. If you make that team, you’re up there with the best in the world in your position... But it’s a very different feeling playing for Tonga. There’s more emotion in the Tongan jersey. You know what your family has been through and you think about them every time you put it on.

— Michael Jennings, AthletesVoice

After Tonga's semi-final against England, which was attended by King Tupou VI, 29 November 2018 was declared a public holiday in Tonga as Mate Ma'a Tonga Day and the entire Tongan squad was invited to the Royal Palace. Every player was honoured as Knight Commander of the Most Illustrious Order of Queen Sālote Tupou III for their contribution to sports. At the conclusion of the tournament, Tonga jumped to 4th in the RLIF world rankings.

After the tournament, several players (Note: Including Andrew Fifita, Tevita Pangai Junior, Michael Jennings, Tuimoala Lolohea, Solomone Kata, David Fusitu'a, and Jason Taumalolo.) publicly reaffirmed their allegiance to the Tongan team as the media speculated whether they would return to their tier-one nations, assuming they were to be welcomed back. Addin Fonua-Blake also announced his intention to represent Tonga after playing for New Zealand at the World Cup, commenting "I really enjoyed my time with the Kiwis but it just didn't feel like home." As a consequence, New Zealand's squad for their match against England on 24 June 2018 contained just one Tongan-eligible player, Dallin Watene-Zelezniak, who reportedly pledged his loyalty to the Kiwis to honour his great-grandfather Puti Tipene Watene, the first Māori to captain the side.

Tonga faced Australia for the first time ever on 20 October 2018, losing 34–16.

On 22 June 2019, Tonga faced New Zealand again at Mount Smart Stadium as part of the 2019 Oceania Cup. The Kiwis won 34–14 in a dominant display. After the NRL season ended, Tonga played against the touring Great Britain on 26 October, winning 14–6 at Waikato Stadium in Hamilton. This was Great Britain's first match after a twelve-year hiatus. The following week at Auckland's Eden Park, Tonga faced the Australia in an Oceania Cup match. Tonga stunned the world number one nation, winning 16–12, their best win in their history.

This match was labelled one of the greatest upsets in rugby league history, marking the first time Australia had lost to a tier 2 nation since 1978. Jason Taumalolo rated the win above his 2015 NRL Grand Final victory with the North Queensland Cowboys.

Tonga competed at the 2021 Rugby League World Cup in England, having qualified automatically as semi-finalists of the 2017 tournament. The tournament was delayed until 2022 due to the COVID-19 pandemic. The team won all three group games, before falling 18-20 against Samoa in a 'classic' quarter-final that was lauded for its 'athleticism, power and superb ball-handling skills'.

Tonga made history in 2023 with their tour of England, being the first Pacific Island nation to tour a European country.

In the 2024 Rugby League Pacific Championships, Tonga were widely praised for their performance finishing runners-up, highlighting the nation's development in recent years.

== Identity ==
=== Kit suppliers and sponsors ===
Period	Kit provider	Sponsor on front of shirt	Sponsor on top of back of shirt	Sponsor on sleeves
1995 RLWC	Classic	Royal Tongan Airlines		
2000 RLWC	Mitre	GMB Union		
2004-2005	Kombat			
2006-2012	KooGa			
2013 RLWC	BLK	Leiola		
2017	FI-TA	Oreana		Tonga Power Limited
2019 (World Cup Nines)	Dynasty Sport	Real Tonga		Digicell
2022	Dynasty Sport	Pacificast		Digicell
2023	Dynasty Sport	Pacificast		Digicell
2026	Dynasty Sport	The Kingdom of Tonga	FKZ	Digicell

== Coaching staff ==
Also see Category:Tonga national rugby league team coaches.

No.	Name	Years	G	W	L	D	%
1	(New Zealand) Graham Mattson	1994					
2	(New Zealand) Mike McClennan	1995–1998	3	0	2	1	0
3	(Australia) Murray Hurst	1998–2000	8	6	2	0	75
4	(New Zealand) (Tonga) Duane Mann	2006-2007	7	5	2	0	80
5	(Australia) (Tonga) Jim Dymock	2006–2008	8	4	4	0	50
6	(Australia) Rohan Smith	2009	3	0	0	0	0
7	Charlie Tonga	2010–2013	5	3	2	0	60
8	(Australia) Kristian Woolf	2014–present	15	9	6	0	60
9	(Australia) Dean Young (caretaker)	2022	0	0	0	0	0

== Players ==
=== Current squad ===
The Tongan squad for the 2026 Rugby League World Cup. The squad was announced on 6 October 2026.

Jersey numbers in the table reflect the team selected for the Semi-Final match versus New Zealand.

Statistics in this table are compiled from the website, Rugby League Project. They include the match against New Zeland on 7 November 2026.

J#	Player	Age	Position(s)	Tonga						Club	NRL Matches	Other Reps
J#	Player	Age	Position(s)	Dbt	M	T	G	F	P	Club	NRL Matches	Other Reps
1	Lehi Hopoate	21	Fullback	2024	9	0	0	0	0	Manly Warringah Sea Eagles	59
2	Dallin Watene-Zelezniak	31	Wing	2026	3	0	0	0	0	New Zealand Warriors	250	14 3
3	Toluta'u Koula	24	Centre	2022	13	6	0	0	24	Manly Warringah Sea Eagles	101	3
20	Paul Alamoti	22	Centre	2024	6	1	1	0	6	Penrith Panthers	75
5	Sosefo Fifita	23	Wing	2026	4	5	0	0	20	Gold Coast Titans	78	3 2 1
6	Tui Lolohea	31	Five-eighth, Halfback	2015	25	5	9	0	38	Huddersfield Giants	252	1 2
7	Isaiya Katoa	22	Halfback	2022	15	2	49	1	107	Dolphins (NRL)	89
8	Addin Fonua-Blake	31	Prop	2017	21	2	0	0	8	Cronulla-Sutherland Sharks	232	1 3
9	Salesi Foketi	21	Hooker	2026	4	0	0	0	0	Sydney Roosters	44
10	Jason Taumalolo	33	Prop, Lock	2013	22	4	0	0	16	North Queensland Cowboys	309	10 2 1
11	Haumole Olakau'atu	28	Second-row	2022	13	4	0	0	16	Manly Warringah Sea Eagles	130	3
12	Siua Wong	23	Second-row	2023	9	0	0	0	0	Sydney Roosters	66	4
13	Tyson Frizell	35	Lock	2023	6	1	0	0	4	Newcastle Knights	305	16 4 2
14	Soni Luke	30	Hooker	2022	11	1	0	0	4	North Queensland Cowboys	45
15	Stefano Utoikamanu	26	Prop	2025	5	1	0	0	4	Melbourne Storm	127	3
16	Demitric Vaimauga	22	Second-row	2025	5	1	0	0	4	New Zealand Warriors	53
17	Taniela Paseka	29	Prop	2024	6	0	0	0	0	Manly Warringah Sea Eagles	143
18	Leka Halasima	21	Second-row	2025	5	1	0	0	4	New Zealand Warriors	50
19	Latu Fainu	21	Five-eighth	2023	3	0	0	0	0	Wests Tigers	36
21	Kulikefu Finefeuiaki	22	Second-row	2025	2	0	0	0	0	Dolphins (NRL)	80	1
22	Sione Katoa	29	Wing	2022	11	6	0	0	24	Cronulla-Sutherland Sharks	148
–	Talatau Amone	24	Five-eighth	2022	4	2	0	0	8	Wynnum Manly Seagulls	54
IJ	Robert Toia	22	Centre	2025	3	1	0	0	4	Sydney Roosters	45	6
–	Moeaki Fotuaika	26	Prop	2022	11	1	0	0	4	Gold Coast Titans	187	11

Notes

- Five members of the squad have previously played for other international teams:
  - Fiji (1): Wong.
  - New Zealand (3): Fonua-Blake, Taumalolo, and Watene-Zelezniak. Taumalolo also played one match for the NRL All Stars
  - Australia (1): Frizell. Frizell and Fifita have played for the Prime Minister's XIII.
  - Wales (1): Frizell.
- Two members of the squad played in other representative matches:
  - The Tonga Invitational team in 2019 (2): Lolohea and Taumalolo.
- Nine members of the squad have played State of Origin.
  - NSW (5): Fonua-Blake, Frizell, Koula, Olakau'atu, and Utoikamanu. Frizell also played for NSW Country.
  - Queensland (4): Fifita, Finefeuiaki, Fotuaika, and Toia.

=== Notable former players ===
Since rugby league was introduced to the nation of Tonga in 1986 many players of Tongan birth or heritage have gone on to attain notability by participating in NRL or Super League, or both. Additionally many Tongan heritage players have represented other nations (mainly Australia or New Zealand) in addition to Tonga.

A list of seventeen former notable Tongan heritage players below that have played in NRL & Super League all played internationally for Tonga, with twelve of them also having played for other nations.

Player	International Team(s) Represented	Rugby League World Cup Appearances
Martin Masella (Captained)	Tonga	1995 & 2000
Tevita Vaikona	Tonga	1995 & 2000
Lopini Paea (Captained)	Tonga	2008
Etu Uaisele	Tonga	2008
Feleti Mateo	Tonga	2008
John Hopoate	Tonga, Australia	1995 (Represented Australia)
Jim Dymock	Tonga, Australia	1995 (Represented Australia)
Willie Mason	Tonga, Australia	2000
Brent Kite (Captained)	Tonga, Australia	2000, 2008 (Represented Australia) & 2013
Antonio Kaufusi	Tonga, Australia	2008
Duane Mann (Captained)	Tonga, New Zealand	1995 & 2000
George Mann	Tonga, New Zealand	1995
Awen Guttenbeil	Tonga, New Zealand	1995 & 2008
Fuifui Moimoi	Tonga, New Zealand	2013
Epalahame Lauaki	Tonga, New Zealand	2008
Tevita Latu	Tonga, New Zealand	2008
'Sika Manu (Captained)	Tonga, New Zealand	2008 (Represented New Zealand), 2013 & 2017

== Records ==
- **Bold**- denotes that the player is still active.

=== Most capped players ===
#	Name	Career	Caps
1	**Tuimoala Lolohea**	2015–2026	27
2	**Jason Taumalolo**	2013, 2017–2026	24
3	Siliva Havili	2013–2025	23
3	Daniel Tupou	2013–2025	23
3	**Addin Fonua-Blake**	2017–2026	23
6	Ben Murdoch-Masila	2013–2022	17
7	Sio Siua Taukeiaho	2014–2022	16
8	Richard Faʻaoso	2005–2016	15
8	Felise Kaufusi	2015–2025	15
8	Will Hopoate	2017–2023	15
8	**Isaiya Katoa**	2022–2026	15

=== Top try scorers ===
#	Name	Career	Tries
1	Daniel Tupou	2013–2025	13
2	Michael Jennings	2008, 2017–2019	10
3	Etuate Uaisele	2006–2013	7
4	Makasini Richter	2000–2006	6

=== Top points scorers ===
#	Name	Career	Points	Tries	Goals	Field Goals
1	**Isaiya Katoa**	2022–2026	107	2	49	1
2	Joel Taufa'ao	2004–2009	78	3	33	0
3	Takai Taulanga	1998–1999	68	1	32	0
4	Sio Siua Taukeiaho	2014–2022	60	2	26	0
5	Daniel Tupou	2013–2025	48	12	0	0

== Competitive record ==
=== Overall ===
The following table underneath shows Tonga's all-time rugby league results record. Matches include those played as the Tonga Invitational XIII side. They have been participating in International fixtures since 1986.

Up to date as of 16 November 2026

Country	Matches	Won	Drawn	Lost	% Won	Year/s
American Samoa^	2	2	0	0	100%	1988–1998
Australia*	4	1	0	3	25%	2018–2024
Australian Aboriginies	1	0	0	1	0%	1994
Cook Islands	12	11	0	1	92%	1988–2022
England	7	1	0	6	14%	2006–2026
Fiji	13	7	1	5	54%	1992–2017
Fiji Presidents XIII	1	1	0	0	100%	1994
France	2	1	0	1	50%	2000–2006
Great Britain*	1	1	0	0	100%	2019
Ireland	1	1	0	0	100%	2008
Italy^	2	2	0	0	100%	2013–2017
Lebanon	2	2	0	0	100%	2017–2026
Māori~	10	3	0	8	30%	1986–2006
New Zealand	10	2	0	8	20%	1995–2026
New Zealand Residents	1	0	0	1	0%	1997
Niue	3	3	0	0	100%	1990–1994
Papua New Guinea~	9	1	1	7	11%	1995–2022
Samoa	23	11	1	11	50%	1986–2026
Scotland	3	2	0	1	67%	2008–2017
South Africa	1	1	0	0	100%	2000
Tokelau	4	4	0	0	100%	1986–2006
United States	1	1	0	0	100%	2012
Wales	1	1	0	0	100%	2022
Total	114	58	3	53	50.88%	1986–
*Includes two matches played as Tonga Invitational in 2019 (versus Great Britain and Australia).^Tally includes two matches not in the Rugby League Project list (1998 vs American Samoa and 2017 vs Italy). ~Tally includes two matches played by a Friendly Islands team in the 1990 Pacific Cup (versus Papua New Guinea and Māori). A Tonga team also participated in this tournament.

=== Margins and streaks ===
Biggest winning margins

Margin	Score	Opponent	Venue	Date
82	92–10	Cook Islands	Riverside Stadium	30 Oct 2022
48	48–0	Scotland	Browne Park	8 Nov 2008
48	66–18	South Africa	Charlety	28 Oct 2000
46	50–4	Scotland	Barlow Park	29 Oct 2017
36	48–12	France	The Shay	9 Oct 2022
36	36–0	Lebanon	Western Sydney Stadium	23 Oct 2026

Biggest losing margins

Margin	Score	Opponent	Venue	Date
74	0–74	New Zealand	Carlaw Park	22 Oct 1999
48	8–56	New Zealand	Mount Smart Stadium	18 Oct 2008
42	4–46	Western Samoa	Avarua National Stadium	5 Nov 1986
42	12–54	Papua New Guinea	Lloyd Robson Oval	18 Oct 1998
37	19–56	Papua New Guinea	Sir Hubert Murray Stadium	8 July 1996

=== Competitions ===
World Cup Record
Year	Round	Position	Pld	Win	Draw	Loss
(France) 1954	did not enter					
(Australia) 1957	did not enter					
(United Kingdom) 1960	did not enter					
(Australia) (New Zealand) 1968	did not enter					
(United Kingdom) 1970	did not enter					
(France) 1972	did not enter					
(Australia) (France) (New Zealand) (United Kingdom) 1975	did not enter					
(Australia) (New Zealand) 1977	did not enter					
1985–88	did not enter					
1989–92	did not enter					
(England) 1995	Group Stage	7th out of 10	2	0	1	1
(England) (France) (Ireland) (Scotland) (Wales) 2000	Group Stage	9th out of 16	3	1	0	2
(Australia) 2008	Group Stage	7th out of 10	3	2	0	1
(England) (Wales) 2013	Group Stage	9th out of 14	3	2	0	1
(Australia) (New Zealand) (Papua New Guinea) 2017	Semi-final	3rd out of 14	5	4	0	1
(England) 2021	Quarter-final	5th out of 16	4	3	0	1
(Australia) (Papua New Guinea) (New Zealand) 2026	Semi-final	3rd out of 10	4	3	0	1

=== Rugby League Pacific Championship ===
Rugby League Pacific Championship record
Year	Round	Position	GP	W	L	D
2019	Third place	3/3	2	1	1	0
2024	Second place	2/3	3	1	2	0
2025	hird place	3/3	2	0	2	0
Total	0 Titles	4/5	7	2	5	0

== Attendance records ==
=== Highest all-time attendances ===
Attendance	Opposing team	Venue	Tournament
44,682	Samoa	Lang Park, Brisbane	2025 Pacific Championships
38,114	New Zealand	Eden Park, Auckland	2025 Pacific Championships
33,196	Australia	Lang Park, Brisbane	2024 Pacific Championships
30,003	England	Mount Smart Stadium, Auckland	2017 Rugby League World Cup Semi-final
29,411	Samoa	Western Sydney Stadium, Parramatta	2026 Rugby League World Cup
28,728	Australia	Western Sydney Stadium, Parramatta	2024 Pacific Championships Final

=== Highest attendances per opponent ===
Attendance	Opposing team	Venue	Tournament
44,682	Samoa	Lang Park, Brisbane	2025 Pacific Championships
38,114	New Zealand	Eden Park, Auckland	2025 Pacific Championships
33,196	Australia	Lang Park, Brisbane	2024 Pacific Championships
30,003	England	Mount Smart Stadium, Auckland	2017 Rugby League World Cup Semi-final
25,065	Lebanon	Western Sydney Stadium, Parramatta	2026 Rugby League World Cup
18,271	Fiji	Campbelltown Stadium, Sydney	2017 Pacific Tests
10,666	Italy	The Shay, Halifax	2013 Rugby League World Cup
10,554	Cook Islands	Leigh Sports Village, Leigh	2013 Rugby League World Cup
10,409	Papua New Guinea	Langtree Park, St Helens	2021 Rugby League World Cup
10,288	France	Stade Albert Domec, Carcassonne	2000 Rugby League World Cup
9,216	Scotland	Barlow Park, Cairns	2017 Rugby League World Cup
7,752	Wales	Langtree Park, St Helens	2021 Rugby League World Cup
7,498	South Africa	Stade Sébastien Charléty, Paris	2000 Rugby League World Cup
6,165	Ireland	Parramatta Stadium, Sydney	2008 Rugby League World Cup

== IRL Rankings ==
IRL Men's World Rankings
Official rankings as of August 2026
Rank	Change	Team	Pts %
1	Steady	Australia	100
2	Steady	New Zealand	82
3	Steady	Tonga	70
4	Steady	Samoa	56
5	Steady	England	54
6	Steady	Papua New Guinea	47
7	Steady	Fiji	34
8	▲1	Cook Islands	24
9	▲2	Netherlands	23
10	▲2	Ukraine	21
11	▼3	France	21
12	▼2	Serbia	20
13	Steady	Wales	18
14	Steady	Ireland	17
15	Steady	Greece	14
16	Steady	Malta	14
17	▲12	Canada	13
18	▼1	Italy	11
19	▼1	Jamaica	9
20	▲7	Scotland	8
21	▲1	United States	8
22	▼3	Poland	7
23	▼3	Lebanon	7
24	▼1	Germany	7
25	▼1	Czech Republic	6
26	▼5	Norway	6
27	▼2	Chile	5
28	▲2	Philippines	5
29	▼1	South Africa	4
30	Steady	Brazil	3
31	Steady	Morocco	3
32	▲1	Argentina	3
33	▲2	Ghana	2
34	▲2	Kenya	2
35	▼1	Montenegro	2
36	▲1	Nigeria	2
37	▼5	North Macedonia	1
38	Steady	Albania	1
39	Steady	Turkey	1
40	Steady	Bulgaria	1
41	Steady	Cameroon	0
42	Steady	Japan	0
43	Steady	Spain	0
44	Steady	Colombia	0
45	Steady	Russia	0
46	Steady	El Salvador	0
47	Steady	Bosnia and Herzegovina	0
48	Steady	Hong Kong	0
49	Steady	Solomon Islands	0
50	Steady	Vanuatu	0
51	Steady	Hungary	0
52	Steady	Latvia	0
53	Steady	Denmark	0
54	Steady	Belgium	0
55	Steady	Estonia	0
56	Steady	Sweden	0
57	Steady	Niue	0
Complete rankings at www.internationalrugbyleague.com

== Honours ==
- Pacific Cup: 3

1994, 1998, 2006

== See also ==
- Rugby league in Tonga
- Tonga women's national rugby league team
