= 1986 Pacific Cup =

- Number of teams: 6
- Host country: Cook Islands
- Winner: Māori (3rd title)
- Matches played: 10

The 1986 Pacific Cup was the 3rd Pacific Cup, a rugby league tournament held between Pacific teams. The tournament was hosted in the Cook Islands and eventually won by the New Zealand Māori side, who defeated Western Samoa in the final.

== Background ==
The 1986 Pacific Cup was the first to be held after the cancellation of the planned 1979 version. Only the New Zealand Māori side returned from the first two editions, as this Pacific Cup had a more Pacific Island focus than the first two which included Papua New Guinea (who now had Test status) and Australian lower grade sides.

== Squads ==
- The Cook Islands included John Whittaker, George Lajpold and Riki Cowan.
- Coached by Richard Bolton, the New Zealand Māori squad included Gary Mercer, Dave Watson, Adrian Shelford, Mark Woods, Anthony Murray, captain Sam Stewart, Mark Horo, Tawera Nikau and Mike Kuiti. Hugh McGahan, Ron O'Regan, Owen Wright, Tracey McGregor, Andrew Vincent and Brendon Tuuta all pulled out of the side due to injury or professional club commitments. The Māori side played a warm up game before the competition began, defeating Waikato 52–32. It was the first time in over two decades that the Māori side was comprised completely of Māori players, as the side had previously also picked Polynesian players.
- Tokelau included Sam Panapa. The rest of the squad was selected entirely from domestic players, chosen from a population of just over 1000.
- Tonga included John Fifita, George Mann, Dick Uluave and Robert Fonua.
- Western Samoa included Paddy Tuimavave, Anitelea Aiolupotea, To'o Vaega, Lomitusi Sasi, Filitoga Lameta, Esene Faimalo, Robert Moimoi, Mike Kerrigan, Richard Setu and Paul Okesene.

=== Team of the Tournament ===
The 1986 Pacific Cup Tournament team was named at the end of the tournament and included: George Huriwai (Māori), Gary Mercer (Māori), Anitelea Aiolupotea (Samoa), Robert Fonua (Tonga), Alamoni Liavaʻa (Tonga), Paddy Tuimavave (Samoa), Sam Panapa (Tokelau), Neville Ramsay (Māori), Dave Sefuiva (Samoa), Adrian Shelford (Māori), Simona Foua (Tokelau), Mick Curran (Tonga), Lafu Papalii (Samoa), Sam Stewart (Māori), John Fifita (Tonga), Lorne Greene (Māori) and Dick Uluave (Tonga).

== Results ==
=== Pool A ===
	Team	Pld	W	D	L	PF	PA	PD	Pts
1	Māori	2	2	0	0	64	26	38	4
2	Cook Islands	2	1	0	1	32	40	-8	2
3	Niue	2	0	0	2	24	54	-30	0

1986

Cook Islands	22 - 8	Niue

Rarotonga

1986

Niue	16 - 32	Māori

Rarotonga

1986

Māori	32 - 10	Cook Islands

Rarotonga

=== Pool B ===
	Team	Pld	W	D	L	PF	PA	PD	Pts
1	Tonga	2	2	0	0	60	38	22	4
2	Western Samoa	2	1	0	1	50	46	4	2
3	Tokelau	2	0	0	2	34	60	-26	0

1986

Western Samoa	34 - 12	Tokelau

Rarotonga

1986

Tonga	34 - 16	Western Samoa

Rarotonga

1986

Tokelau	22 - 26	Tonga

Rarotonga

=== Playoffs ===
Semifinals
Māori	27
Tonga	18
Western Samoa	48
Cook Islands	0

Semifinal
Tonga	4
Western Samoa	46

Final
Māori	23
Western Samoa	6

1986

Māori	27 - 18	Tonga

Rarotonga

1986

Cook Islands	0 - 48	Western Samoa

Rarotonga

1986

Tonga	4 - 46	Western Samoa

Rarotonga

==== Final ====
1986

Māori	23 - 6	Western Samoa
Tries: Kuiti, Haggie, Ramsey, Huriwai; Goals: Mercer (3); Drop goals: Ramsey		Tries: Taogaga; Goals: Ropati

Rarotonga
