= Niue national rugby league team =

Niue

Team information
- Nickname: The Rock, Coconut Crab (Uga)
- Governing body: Niue Rugby League
- Region: Asia-Pacific
- Head coach: Tuki Jackson
- Captain: Alex Seini
- Home stadium: Alofi Stadium
- IRL ranking: 57th

Uniforms
First colours

Team results
- First international
- Cook Islands 22–8 Niue (Rarotonga, Cook Islands; 1986)
- Biggest win
- Niue 58-8 Japan (Hokkaido, Japan; 19 October 2025)
- Biggest defeat
- Tonga 58–4 Niue (Nuku'alofa, Tonga; 24 October 1990)

The Niue national rugby league team represents Niue in rugby league football. The team played their first match in 1986, and their first Test match in 2013.

== History ==
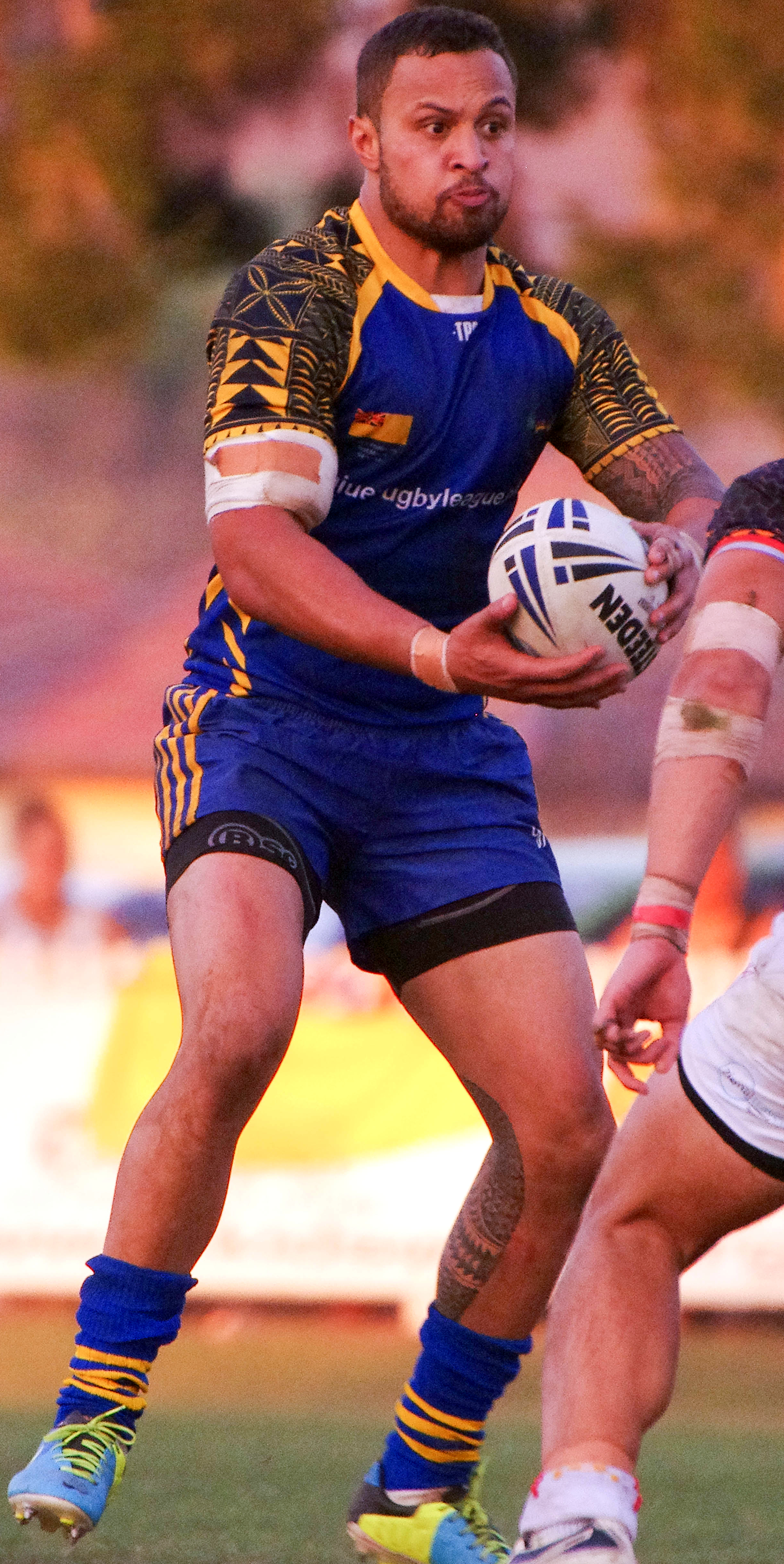
Captain Mike Filimona playing for Niue against the Philippines in 2014

The team played their first match in at the 1986 Pacific Cup, losing 22–8 to the Cook Islands. Their first ever win was 14–0 against Fiji at the 1992 Pacific Cup. Niue currently participates in the annual Cabramatta International Nines tournament. They lost their first ever Test match 22–20 against Vanuatu on 12 October 2013.

On 4 October 2014, the Niue rugby league team record their first ever international test match win defeating the Philippines 36–22. In May 2015, Niue Rugby League recorded their second international test match win against the South African Rugby League side, 48–4.

== Competitive record ==
Below is an updated list of Niue's national team record as of 23 December 2020.

=== Overall ===
Opponent	Played	Won	Drawn	Lost	Win %	For	Aga	Diff
Australian Aboriginies	1	0	0	1	0%	10	64	–54
Cook Islands	3	1	0	2	33.33%	74	67	+7
Fiji	2	1	0	1	50.00%	38	34	+4
(Fiji) Presidents XIII	1	1	0	0	100%	30	8	+22
Greece	1	1	0	0	100%	16	8	+8
Japan	1	1	0	0	100%	58	8	+50
Lebanon	1	0	0	1	0%	16	32	–16
Malta	2	1	0	1	50%	42	40	+2
Māori	3	0	0	3	0%	42	110	–68
Philippines	2	2	0	0	100%	60	34	+26
Samoa	2	0	0	2	0%	46	77	–31
South Africa	3	3	0	0	100%	142	26	+116
Tonga	2	0	0	2	0%	20	82	–62
Vanuatu	1	0	0	1	0%	20	22	–2
Total	24	10	0	14	41.67%	556	604	–48

=== Results ===
Date	Opponent	Score	Competition	Venue	Ref
27 October 1986	Cook Islands	8–22	1986 Pacific Cup	Rarotonga, Cook Islands	
29 October 1986	Māori	16–32	1986 Pacific Cup	Rarotonga, Cook Islands	
21 October 1990	Tokelau	16–26	1986 Pacific Cup	Nukuʻalofa, Tonga	
24 October 1990	Tonga	4–58	1986 Pacific Cup	Nukuʻalofa, Tonga	
26 October 1990	Western Samoa	2–52	1986 Pacific Cup	Nukuʻalofa, Tonga	
18 October 1992	Tonga	8–24	1992 Pacific Cup	Carlaw Park, Auckland, New Zealand	
20 October 1992	Cook Islands	22–23	1992 Pacific Cup	Carlaw Park, Auckland, New Zealand	
22 October 1992	Fiji	14–0	1992 Pacific Cup	Carlaw Park, Auckland, New Zealand	
26 October 1992	Western Samoa	41–28	1992 Pacific Cup	Carlaw Park, Auckland, New Zealand	
22 October 1994	Australian Aborigines	10–64	1994 Pacific Cup	Suva, Fiji	
29 October 1994	Māori	22–24	1994 Pacific Cup	Suva, Fiji	
3 November 1994	Fijian Presidents XIII	30–8	1994 Pacific Cup	Suva, Fiji	
5 November 1994	Tonga	58–12	1994 Pacific Cup	Suva, Fiji	
17 October 2004	Māori	4–54	Pacific Rim Championship	North Harbour Stadium, Auckland, New Zealand	
19 October 2004	Samoa	18–36	Pacific Rim Championship	Ericsson Stadium, Auckland, New Zealand	
23 October 2004	Fiji	24–34	Pacific Rim Championship	North Harbour Stadium, Auckland, New Zealand	
12 October 2013	Vanuatu	20–22	International	Port Vila Municipal Stadium, Port Vila, Vanuatu	
4 October 2014	Philippines	36–22	International	Wentworthville, Australia	
2 May 2015	South Africa	48–4	International	Campbelltown Stadium, Campbelltown, Australia	
3 October 2015	Cook Islands	44–22	International	Sydney, Australia	
29 October 2016	South Africa	50–22	International	Brakpan Stadium, Pretoria, South Africa	
2 November 2016	South Africa	44–0	International	Brakpan Stadium, Pretoria, South Africa	
14 October 2017	Lebanon	16–32	Friendly	Leichhardt Oval, Sydney, Australia	
4 October 2018	Malta	26–16	2018 Emerging Nations World Championship	Sydney, Australia	
7 October 2018	Philippines	24–12	2018 Emerging Nations World Championship	Sydney, Australia	
10 October 2018	Greece	16–8	2018 Emerging Nations World Championship	Sydney, Australia	
13 October 2018	Malta	16–24	2018 Emerging Nations World Championship	Sydney, Australia	
27 October 2018	Italy	32–36	Friendly	Marconi Stadium, Sydney, Australia	
19 October 2025	Japan	58–8	Friendly	Hiroo Town, Hokkaido, Japan	
4 November 2025	South Africa	28–34	Friendly	St. Marys Leagues, Penrith, Australia	

== IRL Rankings ==
IRL Men's World Rankings
Official rankings as of August 2026
Rank	Change	Team	Pts %
1	Steady	Australia	100
2	Steady	New Zealand	82
3	Steady	Tonga	70
4	Steady	Samoa	56
5	Steady	England	54
6	Steady	Papua New Guinea	47
7	Steady	Fiji	34
8	▲1	Cook Islands	24
9	▲2	Netherlands	23
10	▲2	Ukraine	21
11	▼3	France	21
12	▼2	Serbia	20
13	Steady	Wales	18
14	Steady	Ireland	17
15	Steady	Greece	14
16	Steady	Malta	14
17	▲12	Canada	13
18	▼1	Italy	11
19	▼1	Jamaica	9
20	▲7	Scotland	8
21	▲1	United States	8
22	▼3	Poland	7
23	▼3	Lebanon	7
24	▼1	Germany	7
25	▼1	Czech Republic	6
26	▼5	Norway	6
27	▼2	Chile	5
28	▲2	Philippines	5
29	▼1	South Africa	4
30	Steady	Brazil	3
31	Steady	Morocco	3
32	▲1	Argentina	3
33	▲2	Ghana	2
34	▲2	Kenya	2
35	▼1	Montenegro	2
36	▲1	Nigeria	2
37	▼5	North Macedonia	1
38	Steady	Albania	1
39	Steady	Turkey	1
40	Steady	Bulgaria	1
41	Steady	Cameroon	0
42	Steady	Japan	0
43	Steady	Spain	0
44	Steady	Colombia	0
45	Steady	Russia	0
46	Steady	El Salvador	0
47	Steady	Bosnia and Herzegovina	0
48	Steady	Hong Kong	0
49	Steady	Solomon Islands	0
50	Steady	Vanuatu	0
51	Steady	Hungary	0
52	Steady	Latvia	0
53	Steady	Denmark	0
54	Steady	Belgium	0
55	Steady	Estonia	0
56	Steady	Sweden	0
57	Steady	Niue	0
Complete rankings at www.internationalrugbyleague.com

== Women's Test Team ==
The Niue women's national rugby league team debuted on the international stage in the 2003 Women's Rugby League World Cup, in which they lost both of their matches. On 7 November 2020, they made their return to international rugby league, with a friendly match against the Tonga women's national rugby league team. The match, held at Mt Smart Stadium served as a lead up to the New Zealand Women vs Samoa Women.

== See also ==
- Niue national rugby union team
