= Indigenous All Stars (rugby league) =

Rugby league team

Team information
- Governing body: Australian Rugby League Commission
- Head coach: Ronald Griffiths
- Captain: Nicholas Hynes
- Most caps: Jack Wighton (9)
- Top try-scorer: Josh Addo-Carr (5)
- Top point-scorer: Johnathan Thurston (38)

Team results
- First international
- Indigenous Beat Papua New Guinea
- Biggest win
- Indigenous All Stars 32-6 NRL All Stars
- Biggest defeat
- Indigenous All Stars 12-44 Māori All Stars
- World Cup
- Appearances: 2008 Opening Ceremony Vs New Zealand Māori

The Indigenous Australian rugby league team (also known as the Indigenous All Stars) is a rugby league team that represents Aboriginal Australians and Torres Strait Islanders. The team was first formed in 1973 and currently plays in an annual All Stars Match against the New Zealand Māori rugby league team.

== History ==
An Aboriginal v White Australian rugby league game was held in Barcaldine in Western Queensland in 1963. These 'Blacks v Whites' games continued annually until 1984.

In 1971 there was an Aboriginal knock-out rugby league competition.

The first Australian Aboriginal rugby league team was assembled in 1973. The Aboriginal team managed to win seven of its nine matches in just 10 days. The team consisted of 34 players: 19 from NSW, 13 from Queensland and two from the Northern Territory. They went on to win games against Kiwi premiers Wellington Petone, the only all-Māori team & Auckland club & Te Atatu, which the Aboriginal side won 17–13.

The side competed in the Pacific Cup in 1990, 1992 and 1994. During this period the team contained New South Wales Rugby League first grade players such as Ricky Walford, Graham Lyons, Ron Gibbs, Darrell Trindall, Paul Davis, Wayne Alberts, George Longbottom and Will Robinson.

In the post-1999 NRL season an Aboriginal side managed by Arthur Beetson defeated the Papua New Guinea Kumuls and the future rugby league Immortal was pushing for an Australia Day match against the Australian national team.

On the same day as the All Stars announcement, the league also revealed the NRL Pre-Season Challenge would return in 2024, with the tournament kicking off on February 15 and running across two weekends.

In 2008 World Cup curtain raiser to the Australia vs. New Zealand match included an Indigenous Australian squad playing against New Zealand Māori which featured several prominent NRL players and rising stars, including Chris Sandow, Wairangi Koopu, Preston Campbell, Shaun Kenny-Dowall and Carl Webb.

Preston Campbell, a highly respected Aboriginal rugby league player, was a driving force behind the setup, in 2010, of a curtain raising match between the Indigenous All Stars, and the NRL All Stars. The Indigenous All Stars played what seems likely become an annual match against the National Rugby League All Stars on 13 February 2010. The squad was chosen in part by public vote. Aboriginal NRL player Sid Domic's artistic ability led him to be selected from a field of six artists to design the Indigenous side's jersey, as well as Johnathan Thurston's and Jamie Soward's custom headgear, for the annual All Stars matches.

2019 will see a new format of the Australian Indigenous All-Stars play the New Zealand Māori at AAMI Park in Melbourne on 15 February. It will be part of an All-Stars double header with the women's teams to play the curtain-raiser Māori and indigenous teams to the men's game. With no All-Stars game in 2017 due to the World Cup, the NRL will be hoping the inclusion of the New Zealand Māori side will spark popularity in the fixture. Four Indigenous players were eligible for both teams: Dane Gagai, Reimis Smith, Josh Hoffman and Javid Bowen.

== Multigenerational All Stars Players ==
^	Denotes current player

Father	All-Stars Games	Son	All-Stars Games
Preston Campbell	1 (2010)	Jayden Campbell	2 (2025-2026)
Tom Learoyd-Lahrs	3 (2010-2012)	Kaiden Lahrs	1 (2026)

== See also ==
- Australian national rugby league team
- List of Indigenous All Stars players
