= 2001 New Zealand Warriors season =

- NRL rank: 8th
- 2001 record: Wins: 12; draws: 2; losses: 12
- Points scored: For: 638; against: 629

Team information
- CEO: Mick Watson
- Coach: Daniel Anderson
- Assistant coach: Tony Kemp
- Captain: Stacey Jones Kevin Campion
- Stadium: Ericsson Stadium
- Avg. attendance: 12,361

Top scorers
- Tries: Henry Fa'afili (14)
- Goals: Ivan Cleary (80)
- Points: Ivan Cleary (173)
← 2000	2002 →

The New Zealand Warriors 2001 season was the New Zealand Warriors' 7th first-grade season, and their first under the new name. The club competed in Australasia's National Rugby League. The coach of the team was Daniel Anderson while Stacey Jones and Kevin Campion were the club's co-captains. The club made the final series for the first time, after finishing eighth in the regular season.

== Milestones ==
- 4 March — Round 3: Ali Lauitiiti played in his 50th match for the club.
- 24 March — Round 6: The Warriors defeat Brisbane for the first time, 13–12.
- 16 June — Round 16: Jason Death played in his 50th match for the club.
- 24 June — Round 17: Awen Guttenbeil played in his 50th match for the club.
- 15 July — Round 19: Logan Swann played in his 100th match for the club.
- 27 August — Round 25: The club reaches the play-offs for the first time when a 24–24 draw with Melbourne secures a finals berth.

== The Sale ==
In November 2000 Tainui sold many of the club's assets to businessman Eric Watson. This purchase included the club's NRL license, the intellectual property rights and the training base but controversially did not include the player contracts.

The club was re-branded as the New Zealand Warriors, with new colours of black and grey — resembling the national sporting colours. Mick Watson was hired as CEO while little known coach Daniel Anderson was appointed head coach.

== Jersey and sponsors ==

The Warriors had a new jersey in 2001, produced by Puma, similar to old designs but with the new owners adding black to the design.

== Fixtures ==
The Warriors used Ericsson Stadium as their home ground in 2001, their only home ground since they entered the competition in 1995.

=== Pre Season trials ===
Date	Opponent	Venue	Result	Score	Tries	Goals	Attendance	Report
3 February	Canterbury Bulls	Rugby League Park, Christchurch	Win	74-12	Toopi (2), Koopu (2), Myles (2), Jones (2), Beverley, Tookey, Seuseu, Fa'afili, Betham, Meli	Jones (7), Myles (2)	4,500	

=== Regular season ===
Date	Round	Opponent	Venue	Result	Score	Tries	Goals	Attendance	Report
18 February	Round 1	Canberra Raiders	Mount Smart Stadium, Auckland	Loss	8-24	Fa'afili	Cleary (2)	11,134	
25 February	Round 2	Northern Eagles	Central Coast Stadium, Gosford	Win	24-16	Beverley, Guttenbeil, Jones, Meli	Cleary (4)	8,012	
4 March	Round 3	Wests Tigers	Campbelltown Sports Ground, Sydney	Loss	10-29	Koopu, Meli	Cleary (1)	8,899	
9 March	Round 4	St. George Illawarra Dragons	Mount Smart Stadium, Auckland	Win	34-8	Betham, Campion, Cleary, Tony, Toopi	Cleary (7)	8,730	
18 March	Round 5	Parramatta Eels	Parramatta Stadium, Sydney	Loss	24-30	Betham, Meli, Morgan, Swann	Cleary (3), Jones (1)	12,141	
24 March	Round 6	Brisbane Broncos	Mount Smart Stadium, Auckland	Win	13-12	Fa'afili, Swann	Jones (2 & FG)	13,921	
31 March	Round 7	Newcastle Knights	EnergyAustralia Stadium, Newcastle	Loss	24-45	Toopi (2), Fa'afili, Meli, Wood	Cleary (2)	15,894	
7 April	Round 8	Canterbury Bulldogs	Westpac Stadium, Wellington	Draw	24-24	Fa'afili, Meli, Justin Murphy, Toopi	Jones (4)	27,724	
16 April	Round 9	Penrith Panthers	Mount Smart Stadium, Auckland	Win	52-8	Meli (2), Murphy (2), Swann (2), Toopi (2), Richard Blackmore, Fa'afili	Cleary (6)	16,876	
21 April	Round 10	Cronulla Sharks	Toyota Park, Sydney	Loss	16-26	Lauiti'iti, Swann, Villasanti	Cleary (2)	9,011	
29 April	Round 11	Sydney Roosters	Sydney Football Stadium, Sydney	Win	42-30	Seuseu (2), Fa'afili, Jones, Meli, Tony, Toopi	Cleary (7)	9,857	
12 May	Round 12	Melbourne Storm	Mount Smart Stadium, Auckland	Loss	20-40	Tony (2), Betham	Cleary (4)	15,167	
20 May	Round 13	North Queensland Cowboys	Dairy Farmers Stadium, Townsville	Loss	18-35	Blackmore, Fa'afili, Swann	Cleary (3)	10,819	
26 May	Round 14	Canberra Raiders	Manuka Oval, Canberra	Win	22-10	Death, Jones, Swann, Tony	Cleary (3)	7,112	
1 June	Round 15	Northern Eagles	Mount Smart Stadium, Auckland	Loss	30-34	Betham, Campion, Cleary, Death, Fa'afili, Toopi	Cleary (5)	12,282	
16 June	Round 16	Wests Tigers	Mount Smart Stadium, Auckland	Loss	16-21	Fa'afili (2), Jones	Cleary (2)	8,333	
24 June	Round 17	St. George Illawarra Dragons	WIN Stadium, Wollongong	Loss	18-38	Guttenbeil, Jones, Tony	Cleary (3)	9,013	
7 July	Round 18	Parramatta Eels	Mount Smart Stadium, Auckland	Win	29-18	Cleary, Hape, Jones, Paleaaesina	Cleary (6 & FG)	10,554	
15 July	Round 19	Brisbane Broncos	Carrara Stadium, Gold Coast	Loss	12-48	Fa'afili, Tookey	Cleary (2)	15,813	
22 July	Round 20	Newcastle Knights	Mount Smart Stadium, Auckland	Loss	30-37	Tony (2), Meli, Paleaaesina, Toopi	Jones (3), Cleary (2)	8,188	
28 July	Round 21	Canterbury Bulldogs	Mount Smart Stadium, Auckland	Win	34-8	Betham, Murphy, Jones, Fa'afili, Swann, Tookey	Jones (5)	10,391	
5 August	Round 22	Penrith Panthers	CUA Stadium, Sydney	Win	48-32	Jones (2), Meli (2), Fa'afili, Lauiti'iti, Swann, Toopi	Cleary (8)	8,234	
11 August	Round 23	Cronulla Sharks	Mount Smart Stadium, Auckland	Win	30-0	Koopu, Myles, Swann, Toopi, Villasanti	Cleary (5)	10,131	
18 August	Round 24	Sydney Roosters	Mount Smart Stadium, Auckland	Win	14-8	Hape, Jones	Jones (2), Cleary (1)	15,665	
27 August	Round 25	Melbourne Storm	Telstra Dome, Melbourne	Draw	24-24	Hape (2), Fa'afili, Myles	Jones (4)	13,298	
2 September	Round 26	North Queensland Cowboys	Mount Smart Stadium, Auckland	Loss	18-30	Koopu, Lauiti'iti, Tony	Jones (3)	24,568	

=== Final Series ===
Qualifying finals
1	Parramatta Eels	56
8	Canterbury Bulldogs	22
2	Newcastle Knights	40
7	Cronulla Sharks	22
3	Brisbane Broncos	6
6	Sydney Roosters	6
4	St. George Illawarra	23
5	NZ Warriors	12

Semifinals
4W	St. George Illawarra	28
2L	Brisbane Broncos	44
3W	Cronulla Sharks	52
1L	Canterbury Bulldogs	10

Preliminary finals
1W	Parramatta Eels	24
Brisbane Broncos	16
2W	Newcastle Knights	18
Cronulla Sharks	10

Final
Parramatta Eels	24
Newcastle Knights	30

Date	Round	Opponent	Venue	Result	Score	Tries	Goals	Attendance	Report
9 September	Qualifying Final	Parramatta Eels	Parramatta Stadium, Sydney	Loss	12 - 56	Koopu, Tony	Cleary (2)	17,336	

== Ladder ==
2001 NRL season
Pos	Team	Pld	W	D	L	PF	PA	PD	Pts
1	Parramatta Eels	26	20	2	4	839	406	+433	42
2	Canterbury-Bankstown Bulldogs	26	17	3	6	617	568	+49	37
3	Newcastle Knights (P)	26	16	1	9	782	639	+143	33
4	Cronulla-Sutherland Sharks	26	15	2	9	594	513	+81	32
5	Brisbane Broncos	26	14	1	11	696	511	+185	29
6	Sydney Roosters	26	13	1	12	647	589	+58	27
7	St. George Illawarra Dragons	26	12	2	12	661	573	+88	26
8	New Zealand Warriors	26	12	2	12	638	629	+9	26
9	Melbourne Storm	26	11	1	14	704	725	-21	23
10	Northern Eagles	26	11	1	14	603	750	-147	23
11	Canberra Raiders	26	9	1	16	600	623	-23	19
12	Wests Tigers	26	9	1	16	474	746	-272	19
13	North Queensland Cowboys	26	6	2	18	514	771	-257	14
14	Penrith Panthers	26	7	0	19	521	847	-326	14

== Squad ==
Twenty Seven players were used by the Warriors in 2001, including three players who made their first grade debuts.

No.	Name	Nationality	Position	Warriors debut	App	T	G	FG	Pts
24	Stacey Jones	(New Zealand)	HB	23 April 1995	26	10	24	1	89
26	Richie Blackmore	(New Zealand)	CE	14 May 1995	8	2	0	0	8
33	Awen Guttenbeil	(New Zealand) / (Tonga)	SR	14 April 1996	26	2	0	0	8
42	Logan Swann	(New Zealand)	SR	1 March 1997	22	10	0	0	40
50	Jerry Seu Seu	(New Zealand) / (Samoa)	PR	16 August 1997	23	2	0	0	8
55	Ali Lauitiiti	(New Zealand) / (Samoa)	SR	19 April 1998	26	3	0	0	12
59	Jason Death	(Australia)	HK / LK	8 March 1999	21	2	0	0	8
61	Monty Betham	(New Zealand) / (Samoa)	HK / LK	8 March 1999	24	5	0	0	20
62	Cliff Beverley	(New Zealand)	FE	21 March 1999	9	1	0	0	4
64	Wairangi Koopu	(New Zealand)	CE / SR	9 April 1999	18	4	0	0	16
65	Francis Meli	(New Zealand) / (Samoa)	WG	2 May 1999	25	11	0	0	44
66	Clinton Toopi	(New Zealand)	CE	2 May 1999	24	11	0	0	44
73	Ivan Cleary	(Australia)	FB / CE	6 February 2000	22	3	80	1	173
76	Mark Tookey	(Australia)	PR	6 February 2000	11	2	0	0	8
77	David Myles	(Australia)	CE	14 February 2000	17	2	0	0	8
80	Shontayne Hape	(New Zealand)	CE	18 March 2000	14	4	0	0	16
81	Henry Fa'afili	(New Zealand) / (Samoa)	WG	26 March 2000	27	14	0	0	56
84	Jonathan Smith	(New Zealand)	SR	24 June 2000	5	0	0	0	0
86	Kevin Campion	(Australia) / (Republic of Ireland)	LK	18 February 2001	23	2	0	0	8
87	Richard Villasanti	(Australia) / (Tonga)	PR	18 February 2001	21	2	0	0	8
88	Justin Morgan	(Wales)	PR	25 February 2001	11	1	0	0	4
89	Jason Temu	(Cook Islands)	PR	4 March 2001	4	0	0	0	0
90	Motu Tony	(New Zealand) / (Samoa)	UH	9 March 2001	19	10	0	0	40
91	Nathan Wood	(Australia)	HK / HB	24 March 2001	17	1	0	0	4
92	Justin Murphy	(France)	WG	7 April 2001	9	4	0	0	16
93	Iafeta Paleaaesina	(New Zealand) / (Samoa)	PR	1 June 2001	5	2	0	0	8
94	Anthony Seu Seu	(New Zealand)	PR	15 July 2001	1	0	0	0	0

== Staff ==
- Chief executive officer: Mick Watson

=== Coaching staff ===
- Head coach: Daniel Anderson
- Assistant coach: Tony Kemp
- Video analysis: Rohan Smith

== Transfers ==
=== Gains ===
Player	Previous club	Length	Notes
Kevin Campion	Brisbane Broncos		
Richard Villasanti	Wests Tigers		
Justin Morgan	Canberra Raiders		
Jason Temu	Newcastle Knights		
Nathan Wood	Sydney City Roosters		
Justin Murphy	Canterbury Bulldogs		

=== Losses ===
Player	Club	Notes
Jason Bell	Retired	
David Mulhall	Wests Tigers	
Henry Perenara	Melbourne Storm	
Paul Whatuira	Melbourne Storm	
Ben Lythe	Mt Albert Lions	
Matthew Spence	Retired	
Scott Coxon	Newcastle Knights	
Robbie Mears	Leeds Rhinos	
John Simon	Wests Tigers	
Talite Liava'a	Perpignan	
Scott Pethybridge	Northern Eagles	
Joe Galuvao	Penrith Panthers	
Odell Manuel	Canberra Raiders	
Terry Hermansson	Retired	
Lee Oudenryn	North Queensland Cowboys	
Nigel Vagana	Canterbury Bulldogs	
Tony Tuimavave	Retired	
Joe Vagana	Bradford Bulls	

== Other teams ==
Players not required by the Warriors each week were released to play in the 2001 Bartercard Cup. This included Anthony Seuseu, Iafeta Paleaaesina, Cliff Beverley, Shontayne Hape, Jason Temu, Motu Tony, Jonathan Smith, Justin Murphy, Mark Tookey and Kevin Campion who all played in the Bartercard Cup and the National Rugby League in 2001.

== Awards ==
Jerry Seuseu won the club's Player of the Year award.
