= 2000 Auckland Warriors season =

- NRL rank: 13th
- 2000 record: Wins: 8; draws: 2; losses: 16
- Points scored: For: 426; against: 662

Team information
- CEO: Trevor McKewen
- Coach: Mark Graham
- Captains: John Simon; Terry Hermansson Stacey Jones
- Stadium: Ericsson Stadium
- Avg. attendance: 12,246

Top scorers
- Tries: Nigel Vagana (12)
- Goals: John Simon (25)
- Points: John Simon (54)
← 1999	2001 →

The Auckland Warriors' 2000 season was the Auckland Warriors' 6th first-grade season. The club competed in Australasia's National Rugby League. The team's coach was Mark Graham, and John Simon was the club's captain.

== Milestones ==
- 20 February - Round 3: Nigel Vagana played in his 50th match for the club.
- 1 April - Round 9: Joe Vagana played in his 100th match for the club.
- 8 April - Round 10: Lee Oudenryn played in his 50th match for the club.
- 6 May - Round 14: The Warriors lost 0–54 to the St. George Illawarra Dragons at WIN Stadium, their largest defeat to date.
- 18 June - Round 20: Jerry Seuseu played in his 50th match for the club.
- October–November: 20 players from the club participated in the World Cup: Stacey Jones, Ali Lauitiiti, Logan Swann, Joe Vagana, Nigel Vagana (New Zealand), Peter Lewis (Cook Islands), Talite Liava'a (Tonga), Monty Betham, Henry Fa'afili, Joe Galuvao, Vae Kololo, Francis Meli, Jerry Seuseu (Samoa), Terry Hermansson, Wairangi Koopu, Odell Manuel, Boycie Nelson, Henry Perenara, Clinton Toopi, Paul Whatuira (Aotearoa Māori).

== Jersey and sponsors ==

For 2000, the Warriors again used a similar style of jersey, produced by Puma. A red away jersey was also used and was occasionally worn at home matches. The main sponsor is Vodafone.

== Fixtures ==
The Warriors used Ericsson Stadium as their home ground in 2000, their only home ground since they entered the competition in 1995.

=== Pre-season trials ===
Date	Opponent	Venue	Result	Score	Tries	Goals	Attendance	Report
14 January	New Zealand Māori	HopuHopu, Ngaruawahia	Win	50-18				
21 January	Canberra Raiders	Western Springs Stadium, Auckland	Win	22-8	Death, J.Vagana, Spence, Manuel	Cleary (3)	16,000	

=== Regular season ===
Date	Round	Opponent	Venue	Result	Score	Tries	Goals	Attendance	Report
6 February	Round 1	Melbourne Storm	Mt Smart Stadium, Auckland	Win	14-6	Death, Swann, Tuimavave	Cleary (1)	20,546	
14 February	Round 2	Wests Tigers	Leichhardt Oval, Sydney	Loss	16-17	N.Vagana (2), Beverley, Myles		10,807	
20 February	Round 3	Brisbane Broncos	Mount Smart Stadium, Auckland	Loss	10-28	Lauiti'iti	Cleary (3)	17,505	
26 February	Round 4	Newcastle Knights	Mt Smart Stadium, Auckland	Draw	18-18	Lauiti'iti, Tuimavave, N.Vagana	Cleary (3)	12,560	
6 March	Round 5	Canberra Raiders	Canberra Stadium, Canberra	Loss	12-56	Tuimavave (2)	Cleary (2)	8,170	
11 March	Round 6	Penrith Panthers	CUA Stadium, Sydney	Loss	24-31	Death, Beverley, Cleary	Lythe (2), Cleary (1), Pethybridge (1)	9,305	
18 March	Round 7	St. George Illawarra Dragons	Mt Smart Stadium, Auckland	Loss	8-36	Death	Lythe (2)	11,217	
26 March	Round 8	Sydney Roosters	Mt Smart Stadium, Auckland	Win	26-22	Beverley, Hermansson, Lauiti'iti, Swann	Simon (5)	11,125	
1 April	Round 9	Parramatta Eels	Parramatta Stadium, Sydney	Loss	22-24	Oudenryn (2), N.Vagana (2)	Simon (3)	12,026	
8 April	Round 10	Canterbury Bulldogs	Telstra Stadium, Sydney	Draw	18-18	Lauiti'iti, Oudenryn, N.Vagana	Simon (3)	7,132	
15 April	Round 11	North Queensland Cowboys	Dairy Farmers Stadium, Townsville	Win	18-12	N.Vagana (2), Tuimavave	Simon (3)	13,557	
24 April	Round 12	Cronulla Sharks	Mt Smart Stadium, Auckland	Win	24-20	Death, Fa'afili, Spence, Oudenryn	Simon (4)	12,286	
29 April	Round 13	Wests Tigers	Mt Smart Stadium, Auckland	Loss	4-30	N.Vagana		12,560	
6 May	Round 14	St. George Illawarra Dragons	WIN Stadium, Wollongong	Loss	0-54			7,039	
13 May	Round 15	Northern Eagles	Brookvale Oval, Sydney	Win	18-14	Lauiti'iti, Myles, N.Vagana	Simon (3)	6,106	
20 May	Round 16	Canterbury Bulldogs	Mt Smart Stadium, Auckland	Win	24-12	Hape (2), Manuel, Oudenryn, N.Vagana	Simon (2)	11,000	
27 May	Round 17	Newcastle Knights	EnergyAustralia Stadium, Newcastle	Loss	12-30	Jones, Mears	Simon (2)	13,954	
3 June	Round 18	Canberra Raiders	Mt Smart Stadium, Auckland	Loss	6-13	Oudenryn	Oudenryn (1)	9,500	
10 June	Round 19	Penrith Panthers	Mt Smart Stadium, Auckland	Loss	20-24	Hape, Mears, Swann	Jones (4)	10,305	
18 June	Round 20	Melbourne Storm	Olympic Park Stadium, Melbourne	Loss	10-56	Fa'afili, Oudenryn	Mulhall (1)	13,028	
24 June	Round 21	Sydney Roosters	Sydney Football Stadium, Sydney	Loss	4-36	Oudenryn		7,286	
30 June	Round 22	Parramatta Eels	Mt Smart Stadium, Auckland	Loss	10-11	Mears, Coxon	Jones (1)	9,220	
8 July	Round 23	Cronulla Sharks	Toyota Park, Sydney	Loss	12-22	Lauiti'iti, Spence	Jones (2)	10,635	
15 July	Round 24	North Queensland Cowboys	Mt Smart Stadium, Auckland	Win	44-12	Swann (2), Fa'afili, Jones, Lauiti'iti, Manuel, Toopi, N.Vagana	Jones (6)	8,105	
22 July	Round 25	Brisbane Broncos	ANZ Stadium, Brisbane	Loss	20-38	Jones, Manuel, Mears, J.Vagana	Jones (2)	17,545	
30 July	Round 26	Northern Eagles	Mt Smart Stadium, Auckland	Win	32-22	Mears (2), Fa'afili, Manuel, Simon, Spence	Jones (4)	13,263	

== Ladder ==
2000 NRL season
Pos	Team	Pld	W	D	L	PF	PA	PD	Pts	Qualification
1	Brisbane Broncos (P)	26	18	2	6	696	388	+308	38	Advance to finals series
2	Sydney Roosters	26	16	0	10	601	520	+81	32	Advance to finals series
3	Newcastle Knights	26	15	1	10	686	532	+154	31	Advance to finals series
4	Canberra Raiders	26	15	0	11	506	479	+27	30	Advance to finals series
5	Penrith Panthers	26	15	0	11	573	562	+11	30	Advance to finals series
6	Melbourne Storm	26	14	1	11	672	529	+143	29	Advance to finals series
7	Parramatta Eels	26	14	1	11	476	456	+20	29	Advance to finals series
8	Cronulla-Sutherland Sharks	26	13	0	13	570	463	+107	26	Advance to finals series
9	St George Illawarra Dragons	26	12	0	14	576	656	−80	24	
10	Wests Tigers	26	11	2	13	519	642	−123	24	
11	Canterbury-Bankstown Bulldogs	26	10	1	15	469	553	−84	21	
12	Northern Eagles	26	9	0	17	476	628	−152	18	
13	Auckland Warriors	26	8	2	16	426	662	−236	18	
14	North Queensland Cowboys	26	7	0	19	436	612	−176	12 (Note: North Queensland were stripped of two competition points due to a breach of the interchange rule in round 4.)	

Source: RLP
(P) Premiers

== Squad ==
Thirty-four players were used by the Warriors in 2000, including seven players who made their first-grade debut.

No.	Name	Nationality	Position	Warriors debut	App	T	G	FG	Pts
13	Tony Tuimavave	(New Zealand) / (Samoa)	PR / LK	10 March 1995	20	5	0	0	20
18	Joe Vagana	(New Zealand) / (Samoa)	PR	18 March 1995	24	1	0	0	4
24	Stacey Jones	(New Zealand)	HB	23 April 1995	19	3	19	0	50
32	Nigel Vagana	(New Zealand) / (Samoa)	CE	4 April 1996	26	12	0	0	48
33	Awen Guttenbeil	(New Zealand) / (Tonga)	SR	14 April 1996	3	0	0	0	0
42	Logan Swann	(New Zealand)	SR	1 March 1997	23	5	0	0	20
47	Lee Oudenryn	(Australia)	WG	6 July 1997	19	8	1	0	34
50	Jerry Seu Seu	(New Zealand) / (Samoa)	PR	16 August 1997	17	0	0	0	0
55	Ali Lauitiiti	(New Zealand) / (Samoa)	SR	19 April 1998	19	7	0	0	28
56	Joe Galuvao	(New Zealand) / (Samoa)	FB / CE	2 May 1998	3	0	0	0	0
58	Odell Manuel	(New Zealand)	WG	8 March 1999	15	4	0	0	16
59	Jason Death	(Australia)	HK / LK	8 March 1999	16	5	0	0	20
60	Terry Hermansson	(New Zealand)	PR	8 March 1999	15	1	0	0	4
61	Monty Betham	(New Zealand) / (Samoa)	HK / LK	8 March 1999	19	0	0	0	0
62	Cliff Beverley	(New Zealand)	FE	21 March 1999	19	3	0	0	12
64	Wairangi Koopu	(New Zealand)	CE / SR	9 April 1999	0	0	0	0	0
65	Francis Meli	(New Zealand) / (Samoa)	WG	2 May 1999	2	0	0	0	0
66	Clinton Toopi	(New Zealand)	CE	2 May 1999	4	1	0	0	4
68	Robert Mears	(Australia)	HK	16 May 1999	25	6	0	0	24
69	John Simon	(Australia)	FE	12 June 1999	20	1	25	0	54
71	Talite Liava'a	(Tonga)	PR	4 July 1999	9	0	0	0	0
72	Scott Pethybridge	(Australia)	UB	6 February 2000	14	0	1	0	2
73	Ivan Cleary	(Australia)	FB / CE	6 February 2000	5	1	10	0	24
74	Matt Spence	(New Zealand)	SR	6 February 2000	18	3	0	0	12
75	Scott Coxon	(Australia)	SR	6 February 2000	12	1	0	0	4
76	Mark Tookey	(Australia)	PR	6 February 2000	10	0	0	0	0
77	David Myles	(Australia)	CE	14 February 2000	21	2	0	0	8
78	Paul Whatuira	(New Zealand)	CE	14 February 2000	5	0	0	0	0
79	Ben Lythe	(New Zealand)	HB	26 February 2000	5	0	4	0	8
80	Shontayne Hape	(New Zealand)	CE	18 March 2000	13	3	0	0	12
81	Henry Fa'afili	(New Zealand) / (Samoa)	WG	26 March 2000	13	4	0	0	16
82	Jason Bell	(Australia)	FE / HK	13 May 2000	8	0	0	0	0
83	David Mulhall	(New Zealand)	FB	18 June 2000	3	0	1	0	2
84	Jonathan Smith	(New Zealand)	SR	24 June 2000	2	0	0	0	0
85	Henry Perenara	(New Zealand)	SR	24 June 2000	3	0	0	0	0

== Staff ==
- Chief Executive Officer: Trevor McKewen

=== Coaching staff ===
- Head coach: Mark Graham

== Transfers ==
=== Gains ===
Player	Previous club	Length	Notes
Scott Pethybridge	North Sydney Bears		
Ivan Cleary	Sydney City Roosters		
Matthew Spence	Western Suburbs Magpies		
Scott Coxon	Western Suburbs Magpies		
Mark Tookey	Parramatta Eels		
David Myles	Cronulla Sharks		

==== Mid-Season Gains ====
Player	Previous club	Length	Notes
Jason Bell	Newtown Jets		Debut Round 15
David Mulhall	Brisbane Souths		Debut Round 20

=== Losses ===
Player	Club	Notes
Tony Tatupu	Wakefield Trinity Wildcats	
Syd Eru	Retired	
Matthew Ridge	Retired	
Bryan Henare	St Helens R.F.C.	
Brady Malam	Wigan Warriors	
Shane Endacott	Retired	
Peter Lewis	Mt Albert Lions	
Carl Doherty	Mt Albert Lions	
Boycie Nelson	Otahuhu Leopards	

== Other teams ==
The Warriors had feeder agreements with the Newtown Jets in the NSWRL Premier League and Brisbane Souths in the Queensland Cup. Players not selected for the first-grade side would be sent to one of these clubs for the weekend. This arrangement also worked the other way when the Warriors signed Jason Bell from the Jets midway through the season, and the Brisbane Souths captain, David Mulhall, debuted in Round 20. Occasionally, players were also released to Bartercard Cup teams.

== Awards ==
Robert Mears won the club's Player of the Year award.
