= 1999 Auckland Warriors season =

- NRL rank: 11th
- 1999 record: Wins: 10; draws: 0; losses: 14
- Points scored: For: 538; against: 498

Team information
- CEO: Trevor McKewen
- Coach: Mark Graham
- Captains: Matthew Ridge; Stacey Jones John Simon
- Stadium: Ericsson Stadium
- Avg. attendance: 11,135

Top scorers
- Tries: Stacey Jones (15)
- Goals: Matthew Ridge (34)
- Points: Matthew Ridge (80)
← 1998	2000 →

The Auckland Warriors 1999 season was the Auckland Warriors 5th first-grade season. The club competed in Australasia's National Rugby League. The coach of the team was Mark Graham while Matthew Ridge was the club's captain.

== Milestones ==
- 13 March – Round 2: Tony Tatupu plays his 50th match for the club.
- 21 March – Round 3: Brady Malam plays his 50th match for the club.
- 16 May – Round 11: Tony Tuimavave plays his 50th match for the club.
- 30 May – Round 13: Logan Swann plays his 50th match for the club.
- 21 August – Round 25: Stacey Jones becomes the first player to appear in 100 first-grade games for the club.

== Jersey and sponsors ==

For 1999 the Warriors again used a similar style of jersey, produced by Nike, Inc., with Vodafone the shirt sponsor and Bartercard as sleeve sponsor.

== Sale to Tainui ==
Between the 1998 and 1999 seasons the Auckland Rugby League sold the Auckland Warriors to a consortium that included majority investor the Tainui tribe as well as Graham Lowe and Malcolm Boyle. The new owners cleaned out the management and coaching structures and also straightened the tongue on the Warriors logo, as a curved tongue is believed to be cursed in Māori culture.

The consortium paid $2 million in cash, $1.5 million in deferred settlement over three years and an annual development grant of $250,000. The Auckland Rugby League was forced to write off the deferred settlement in 2000 when the Auckland Warriors folded and the assets were purchased by the New Zealand Warriors.

== Fixtures ==
The Warriors used Ericsson Stadium as their home ground in 1999, their only home ground since they entered the competition in 1995.

=== Country Carnival ===
Date	Round	Opponent	Venue	Result	Score	Tries	Goals	Attendance	Report
12 February	Trial 1	Melbourne Storm	Lang Park, Brisbane	Win	16-14	Oudenryn (2), Ridge	Ridge (1)	2,500	
20 February	Trial 2	Brisbane Broncos	Toowoomba	Loss	10-22	Manuel, Jones	Ridge (1)	7,146	

=== Regular season ===
Date	Round	Opponent	Venue	Result	Score	Tries	Goals	Attendance	Report
8 March	Round 1	Sydney Roosters	Sydney Football Stadium, Sydney	Win	26-16	Ridge (2), Galuvao, Jones	Ridge (5)	10,124	
13 March	Round 2	North Sydney Bears	Ericsson Stadium, Auckland	Lost	18-22	Galuvao, Jones, Swann	Ridge (3)	20,268	
21 March	Round 3	Manly Sea Eagles	Brookvale Oval	Win	36-10	Death, Henare, Jones, Manuel, Swann, J.Vagana, N.Vagana	Jones (3), Ngamu (1)	7,077	
28 March	Round 4	Sydney Roosters	Ericsson Stadium, Auckland	Lost	14-28	Manuel, N.Vagana	Ridge (3)	17,492	
3 April	Round 5	Balmain Tigers	Leichhardt Oval, Sydney	Lost	8-17	Jones	Ridge (2)	7,460	
9 April	Round 6	Melbourne Storm	Ericsson Stadium, Auckland	10-38	10-38	Lauitiiti, Oudenryn	Jones (1)	10,343	
18 April	Round 7	North Queensland Cowboys	Ericsson Stadium, Auckland	Lost	0-24			8,954	
	Round 8	Bye							
2 May	Round 9	South Sydney Rabbitohs	Ericsson Stadium, Auckland	Lost	8-12	Beverley	Doherty (1), Jones (1)	7,241	
8 May	Round 10	Parramatta Eels	Parramatta Stadium, Sydney	Lost	6-28	Koopu	Ridge (1)	13,087	
16 May	Round 11	Canberra Raiders	Ericsson Stadium, Auckland	Win	32-30	Galuvao, Lauiti'iti, Manuel, Mears, J.Vagana	Ridge (6)	9,423	
23 May	Round 12	Canterbury Bulldogs	Telstra Stadium, Sydney	Lost	28-24	Lauiti'iti (2), Endacott, Jones	Doherty (4)	9,062	
30 May	Round 13	Parramatta Eels	Ericsson Stadium, Auckland	Lost	18-25	Jones, Swann	Doherty (5)	8,940	
	Round 14	Bye							
12 June	Round 15	Penrith Panthers	CUA Stadium, Sydney	Lost	20-34	N.Vagana (2), Mears	Doherty (4)	7,097	
19 June	Round 16	Canterbury Bulldogs	Ericsson Stadium, Auckland	Win	30-10	N.Vagana (2), Hoppe, Jones, Manuel, J.Vagana	Simon (3)	9,500	
26 June	Round 17	Balmain Tigers	Ericsson Stadium, Auckland	Win	22-4	Swann, Manuel, Seuseu, N.Vagana	Simon (1)	8,506	
4 July	Round 18	Canberra Raiders	Canberra Stadium, Canberra	Lost	22-46	Hoppe, Manuel, Mears, N.Vagana	Simon (3)	10,155	
10 July	Round 19	Brisbane Broncos	ANZ Stadium, Brisbane	Lost	16-24	Death, Lauiti'iti, Nelson	Simon (2)	14,941	
16 July	Round 20	Cronulla Sharks	Ericsson Stadium, Auckland	Lost	20-22	Jones, Oudenryn, Mears	Simon (4)	8,000	
25 July	Round 21	South Sydney Rabbitohs	Sydney Football Stadium, Sydney	Win	20-16	Jones, Manuel, Swann, Tuimavave	Ridge (2)	7,364	
1 August	Round 22	Melbourne Storm	Olympic Park Stadium, Melbourne	Lost	14-16	Lewis, Tuimavave	Simon (2), Ridge (1)	13,435	
6 August	Round 23	St. George Illawarra Dragons	Ericsson Stadium, Auckland	Win	32-18	Beverley, Jones, Lauiti'iti, Manuel, Meli, N.Vagana	Simon (4)	9,564	
14 August	Round 24	North Queensland Cowboys	Dairy Farmers Stadium, Townsville	Win	40-14	Oudenryn (3), Jones, Swann, J.Vagana, N.Vagana	Ridge (4), Simon (2)	13,832	
21 August	Round 25	Newcastle Knights	Ericsson Stadium, Auckland	Win	42-0	Death (2), Lauiti'iti, Oudenryn, Ridge, Simon, N.Vagana	Ridge (7)	15,385	
29 August	Round 26	Western Suburbs Magpies	Campbelltown Sports Ground, Sydney	Win	60-16	Jones (4), Beverley (2), Oudenryn (2), Manuel, Meli, J.Vagana, N.Vagana	Simon (5), Swann (1)	7,793	

== Ladder ==
1999 NRL season
Pos	Team	Pld	W	D	L	B	PF	PA	PD	Pts
1	Cronulla-Sutherland Sharks	24	18	0	6	2	586	332	+254	40
2	Parramatta Eels	24	17	0	7	2	500	294	+206	38
3	Melbourne Storm (P)	24	16	0	8	2	639	392	+247	36
4	Sydney City Roosters	24	16	0	8	2	592	377	+215	36
5	Canterbury-Bankstown Bulldogs	24	15	1	8	2	520	462	+58	35
6	St. George Illawarra Dragons	24	15	0	9	2	588	416	+172	34
7	Newcastle Knights	24	14	1	9	2	575	484	+91	33
8	Brisbane Broncos	24	13	2	9	2	510	368	+142	32
9	Canberra Raiders	24	13	1	10	2	618	439	+179	31
10	Penrith Panthers	24	11	1	12	2	492	428	+64	27
11	Auckland Warriors	24	10	0	14	2	538	498	+40	24
12	South Sydney Rabbitohs	24	10	0	14	2	349	556	-207	24
13	Manly Warringah Sea Eagles	24	9	1	14	2	454	623	-169	23
14	North Sydney Bears	24	8	0	16	2	490	642	-152	20
15	Balmain Tigers	24	8	0	16	2	345	636	-291	20
16	North Queensland Cowboys	24	4	1	19	2	398	588	-190	13
17	Western Suburbs Magpies	24	3	0	21	2	285	944	-659	10

== Squad ==
Thirty two players were used by the Warriors in 1999, including eight players making their first grade debuts.

No.	Name	Nationality	Position	Warriors debut	App	T	G	FG	Pts
3	Sean Hoppe	(New Zealand)	WG	10 March 1995	13	2	0	0	8
6	Gene Ngamu	(New Zealand)	FE	10 March 1995	6	0	1	0	2
12	Tony Tatupu	(New Zealand)	SR	10 March 1995	21	0	0	0	0
13	Tony Tuimavave	(New Zealand)	PR / LK	10 March 1995	16	2	0	0	8
18	Joe Vagana	(New Zealand) / (Samoa)	PR	18 March 1995	24	5	0	0	20
19	Syd Eru	(New Zealand)	HK	28 March 1995	2	0	0	0	0
24	Stacey Jones	(New Zealand)	HB	23 April 1995	24	15	5	0	70
32	Nigel Vagana	(New Zealand) / (Samoa)	CE	4 April 1996	21	12	0	0	48
33	Awen Guttenbeil	(New Zealand) / (Tonga)	SR	14 April 1996	3	0	0	0	0
37	Brady Malam	(New Zealand)	PR	23 June 1996	8	0	0	0	0
38	Bryan Henare	(New Zealand)	SR	23 July 1996	7	1	0	0	4
40	Matthew Ridge	(New Zealand)	FB	1 March 1997	10	3	34	0	80
42	Logan Swann	(New Zealand)	SR	1 March 1997	24	7	1	0	30
44	Shane Endacott	(New Zealand)	FE	29 March 1997	17	1	0	0	4
47	Lee Oudenryn	(Australia)	WG	6 July 1997	17	8	0	0	32
50	Jerry Seu Seu	(New Zealand) / (Samoa)	PR	16 August 1997	16	1	0	0	4
55	Ali Lauitiiti	(New Zealand) / (Samoa)	SR	19 April 1998	20	7	0	0	28
56	Joe Galuvao	(New Zealand) / (Samoa)	FB / CE	2 May 1998	13	3	0	0	12
58	Odell Manuel	(New Zealand)	WG	8 March 1999	24	9	0	0	36
59	Jason Death	(Australia)	HK / LK	8 March 1999	18	4	0	0	16
60	Terry Hermansson	(New Zealand)	PR	8 March 1999	24	0	0	0	0
61	Monty Betham	(New Zealand)	HK / LK	8 March 1999	3	0	0	0	0
62	Cliff Beverley	(New Zealand)	FE	21 March 1999	16	4	0	0	16
63	Peter Lewis	(New Zealand)	CE	3 April 1999	11	1	0	0	4
64	Wairangi Koopu	(New Zealand)	CE / SR	9 April 1999	6	1	0	0	4
65	Francis Meli	(New Zealand) / (Samoa)	WG	2 May 1999	3	2	0	0	8
66	Clinton Toopi	(New Zealand)	CE	2 May 1999	2	0	0	0	0
67	Carl Doherty	(New Zealand)	FB	2 May 1999	5	0	14	0	28
68	Robert Mears	(Australia)	HK	16 May 1999	15	4	0	0	16
69	John Simon	(Australia)	FE	12 June 1999	12	1	26	0	56
70	Boycie Nelson	(New Zealand)	CE	19 June 1999	5	1	0	0	4
71	Talite Liava'a	(Tonga)	PR	4 July 1999	2	0	0	0	0

== Staff ==
- Chief executive officer: Trevor McKewen
- Football manager: Hugh McGahan

=== Coaching staff ===
- Head coach: Mark Graham
- Assistant coach: Mike McClennan

== Transfers ==
=== Gains ===
Player	Previous club	Length	Notes
Jason Death	North Queensland Cowboys		
Terry Hermansson	Souths		
Boycie Nelson	Widnes Vikings		

==== Mid-Season Gains ====
Player	Previous club	Length	Notes
Robert Mears	Canterbury Bulldogs		Debut Rd 11
John Simon	Parramatta Eels		Debut Rd 15
Talite Liava'a	Balmain Tigers		Debut Rd 18

=== Losses ===
Player	Club	Notes
Stephen Kearney	Melbourne Storm	
Tea Ropati	Retired	
Marc Ellis	North Harbour Rugby Union	
Anthony Swann	North Sydney Bears	
Paul Staladi	Northland Rugby Union	
Aaron Whittaker	Canterbury Rugby League	
Kevin Iro	St Helens R.F.C.	
Quentin Pongia	Sydney Roosters	
Tyran Smith	Canberra Raiders	
Zane Clarke	Cessnock	
Frank Watene	Wakefield Trinity Wildcats	

==== Mid-Season Losses ====
Player	Future Club
Gene Ngamu	Huddersfield-Sheffield
Sean Hoppe	St Helens R.F.C.

== Other teams ==
During the 1999 season players not selected for first grade competed in the NZRL's National Provincial competition. The Warriors also sent four players a week to play for the Wynnum Manly Seagulls and Brisbane Souths.

== Awards ==
Jason Death won the club's Player of the Year award.
