= Rugby League Tri-Nations =

Competition among Australia, New Zealand and Great Britain

- Sport: Rugby league
- Instituted: 1999
- Ceased: 2006
- Replaced by: Four Nations
- Number of teams: 3
- Countries: Australia; New Zealand; United Kingdom
- Last winners: Australia (2006)
- Most titles: Australia (3 titles)

The Rugby League Tri-Nations (known as the Gillette Tri-Nations for sponsorship reasons) was a rugby league tournament involving the top three teams in the sport: Australia, Great Britain and New Zealand and is the predecessor of today's Rugby League Four Nations.

First contested in 1999 (as the Tri-Series), it is a logical continuation of the format originally used for the Rugby League World Cup in which the best teams in the world play in a round-robin tournament leading to the two top teams contesting a final. The World Cup itself is now contested by a much larger number of nations. Four Tri-Nations tournaments were held before 2009 when the competition was replaced by a Four Nations series.

== The competition ==
The tournament has been organised in two different formats. In 1999 each team played the others once, before the top two teams played each other in a final. From 2004 each team has played the others twice before the tournament final. The top two teams are calculated using a league table. Teams receive:

- 2 points for a win
- 1 point for a draw
- 0 points for a loss

The tournament begins in the middle of October, after the National Rugby League grand final. Australia and New Zealand play each other at this time, and Great Britain enters the tournament after the Super League grand final.

During the tournament, some teams have also played additional Test matches. In the southern hemisphere New Zealand has played Tonga, and in the northern hemisphere Australia and New Zealand have played France.

== History ==
The first Tri-Nations tournament was held in 1999 in Australia and New Zealand. When the Great Britain team only narrowly defeated the Queensland Cup premiers, the Burleigh Bears, it became apparent that they would not pose a serious threat to the other two teams. Accordingly, a very small crowd attended the Test between the Kangaroos and the Lions at Suncorp Stadium. Fearing a similar crowd for the tournament final, organisers moved that match from Sydney to Auckland. With the Rugby League World Cup being held in 2000, the Tri-nations tournament was put on hold indefinitely.

Australia was to dominate international rugby league over the next three years, winning the World Cup, defeating Great Britain 2–1 and 3–0 in Kangaroo Tours in 2001 and 2003, and defeating Great Britain and New Zealand by large margins in the mid-year Tests of 2002 and 2003. There was much criticism of the state of international rugby league in the media at this time. In response, Brisbane Broncos coach, Wayne Bennett, proposed that the Tri-nations tournament be resurrected (albeit without a final). Accordingly, a revamped Tri-nations tournament was played in 2004.

With the exception of the first match between Australia and New Zealand, the 2004 Tri-Nations was held in the United Kingdom. Each of the qualifying games was highly competitive, especially Australia's loss to Great Britain, who finished at the top of the Tri-Nations table. Although Australia soundly defeated Great Britain in the final, the tournament was widely considered to be a success, making a profit of £750,000.

The 2005 Tri-Nations opened with games in both Australia and New Zealand, before moving to the United Kingdom for the remainder of the tournament. Although some of the matches were not as close as the previous tournament, all three teams were in contention for the final by the last group match. New Zealand won the final, defeating Australia 24–0 at Elland Road in Leeds. This was Australia's first defeat in an international test series in 27 years. The 2006 Tri-nations tournament was held in Australia and New Zealand. Controversy erupted as Nathan Fien was determined to be ineligible to play for New Zealand. This resulted in a loss of two competition points that New Zealand gained from their win against Great Britain in Christchurch. Great Britain then went on to beat Australia in Sydney 23–12, their first win in Australia since 1992, leaving the series wide open. However Great Britain went on to suffer heavy defeats in their last two games, leaving Australia and New Zealand to again contest the final. Australia won 16–12, the game having gone to golden point extra time after finishing 12–12 after 80 minutes.

The United Kingdom and France hosted the new Four Nations series in 2009. Great Britain would not compete in the tournament, with England replacing them. The Rugby League International Federation announced on 10 November 2006 that the France would participate in the 2009 tournament.

== Results ==
=== List of Finals ===
Year	Winners	Score	Runner–up	Venue	City	Attendance
1999	Australia	22–20	New Zealand	Mount Smart Stadium	Auckland	21,204
2004	Australia	44–4	Great Britain	Elland Road	Leeds	39,120
2005	New Zealand	24–0	Australia	Elland Road	Leeds	26,534
2006	Australia	16–12	New Zealand	Sydney Football Stadium	Sydney	27,325

=== Aggregate table ===
Team	Played	Won	Drew	Lost	For	Against	Difference
Australia	14	9	1	4	334	240	94
New Zealand	14	6	1	7	299	296	3
Great Britain	14	5	0	9	211	307	−97

NOTE: Does not include finals matches, only qualifiers.

- N.B. No competition for and against points were allocated for New Zealand v Great Britain from 28 October 2006, due to New Zealand fielding an ineligible player..

== Statistics ==
=== Try scorers ===
Tries scored	Name
9	Darren Lockyer (Aus), Nigel Vagana (NZ)
8	Brent Webb (NZ)
7	Mark Gasnier (Aus)
6	Brian Carney (GB), Luke Rooney (Aus)
5	Matt Cooper (Aus), Anthony Minichiello (Aus), Keith Senior (GB), Clinton Toopi (NZ), Manu Vatuvei (NZ)
4	Greg Inglis (Aus), Stuart Reardon (GB), Paul Johnson (GB), Isoia Soliola (NZ), Brent Tate (Aus),
3	Vinnie Anderson (NZ), Karmichael Hunt (Aus), Mark O'Meley (Aus), Willie Tonga (Aus), Jake Webster (NZ)
2	Nathan Cayless (NZ), Gareth Ellis (GB), Stuart Fielden (GB), Brad Fittler (Aus), Matthew Gidley (Aus), Shontayne Hape (NZ), Sean Long (GB), Willie Mason (Aus), Terry Newton (GB), Mat Rogers (Aus), Wendell Sailor (Aus), Motu Tony (NZ), Paul Wellens (GB)
1	Louis Anderson (NZ), Shaun Berrigan (Aus), Petero Civoniceva (Aus), Alex Chan (NZ), Paul Deacon (GB), David Faiumu (NZ), Andy Farrell (GB), Lee Gilmour (GB), Martin Gleeson (GB), Iestyn Harris (GB), Justin Hodges (Aus), Richard Horne (GB), Andrew Johns (Aus), Matthew Johns (Aus), Stephen Kearney (NZ), Brett Kimmorley (Aus), Matt King (Aus), Ali Lauiti'iti (NZ), Jamie Lowrie (NZ), Francis Meli (NZ), Adrian Morley (GB), Danny McGuire (GB), Robbie Paul (NZ), Jamie Peacock (GB), Frank Pritchard (NZ), Paul Rauhihi (NZ), Robert Richardson (Aus), Jerome Ropati (NZ), Matthew Rua (NZ), Matt Sing (Aus), Jason Smith (Aus), Willie Talau (NZ), Anthony Tupou (Aus), Joe Vagana (NZ), Lesley Vainikolo (NZ), Chev Walker (GB), Paul Whatuira (NZ), Ruben Wiki (NZ), Sonny Bill Williams (NZ)

=== Venues ===
Stadium	City	Matches played	Highest Attendance
Mt Smart Stadium	Auckland	5	22,540
Elland Road	Leeds	2	39,120
Galpharm Stadium	Huddersfield	2	20,372
JJB Stadium	Wigan	2	25,004
KC Stadium	Hull	2	25,150
Loftus Road	London	2	16,752
Lang Park	Brisbane	2	44,358
Sydney Football Stadium	Sydney	2	27,325
City of Manchester Stadium	Manchester	1	38,572
Jade Stadium	Christchurch	1	17,005
North Harbour Stadium	Auckland	1	19,118
Docklands Stadium	Melbourne	1	30,372
Stadium Australia	Sydney	1	28,255
Westpac Stadium	Wellington	1	16,401

== Trivia ==
- New Zealand's win in the 2005 Rugby League Tri-Nations was the first time that Australia had not won an international test series for 27 years. It was also the Kiwis first series win over Australia since 1952.
- The tournament was not held in 2007, as New Zealand instead completed a celebratory tour of Europe, commemorating 100 years of international rugby league. Australia played Tests against New Zealand in April and October 2007.
- The tournament was not held in 2008 due to the staging of the Rugby League World Cup held in Australia, commemorating 100 years of rugby league in that country.
- No team has gone through the tournament unbeaten.
- The winning team did not finish at the top of the table in the first three Tri-Nations series: New Zealand were placed first in 1999, followed by Great Britain in 2004 and Australia in 2005. Australia broke this trend in 2006.

== See also ==
- Rugby League Four Nations
- Australia national rugby league team
- Great Britain national rugby league team
- New Zealand national rugby league team
