= Mulhall =

Mulhall may refer to:

== People ==
- Chris Mulhall (born 1988), Irish footballer
- David Mulhall, Australian rugby player
- George Mulhall (1936–2018), Scottish footballer and manager
- Jack Mulhall (1887–1979), American film actor
- Laura Mulhall (born 1957), Argentine women's field hockey player
- Lucille Mulhall (1885–1940), American rodeo performer
- Michael Mulhall (born 1962), Roman Catholic prelate
- Michael George Mulhall (1836-1900), Irish author, statistician, economist, and newspaper editor
- Stephen Mulhall (born 1962), British philosopher

== Places ==
- Mulhall, Oklahoma
