= 2006 Rugby League Tri-Nations =

2006 Tri-Nations
- Number of teams: 3
- Host countries: Australia; New Zealand
- Winner: Australia (3rd title)
- Matches played: 7
- Attendance: 178,661 (25,523 per match)
- Tries scored: 45 (6.43 per match)
- Top scorer: (Australia) Johnathan Thurston (34)
- Top try scorers: (New Zealand) Iosia Soliola (4) (Australia) Greg Inglis (4)

The 2006 Rugby League Tri-Nations (also known as the Gillette Rugby League Tri-Nations for sponsorship reasons) was the second Rugby League Tri-Nations tournament. IUt was hosted by Australia and New Zealand, and also included Great Britain. The tournament followed the same format as in 2004 and 2005, with each team meeting the other two teams twice, and the top two teams at the end of the group stages proceeding to the final. Australia won a tight final against New Zealand, winning in golden point extra time with Kangaroos captain Darren Lockyer scoring a try in the 87th minute.

== Teams ==
=== Squads ===
==== Australia ====
Coach: Ricky Stuart (Cronulla-Sutherland Sharks)
Assistant: Craig Bellamy

Club	Players
(Australia) Brisbane Broncos	Shaun Berrigan, ~~Tonie Carroll~~, Petero Civoniceva, Justin Hodges, Karmichael Hunt, Darren Lockyer (captain), Brent Tate and Sam Thaiday
(Australia) St George Illawarra Dragons	Mark Gasnier and Ben Hornby
(Australia) Manly Warringah Sea Eagles	Brent Kite, Jamie Lyon
(Australia) Sydney Roosters	Anthony Tupou
(England) St Helens R.F.C.	Jamie Lyon
(Australia) Bulldogs	Willie Mason, Mark O'Meley, Andrew Ryan, and ~~Reni Maitua~~
(Australia) North Queensland Cowboys	Luke O'Donnell, Johnathan Thurston
(Australia) Melbourne Storm	Greg Inglis, Matt King, Cameron Smith and Antonio Kaufusi
(Australia) Parramatta Eels	Nathan Hindmarsh and Jarryd Hayne

==== Great Britain ====
Coach: Brian Noble (Wigan Warriors)

Club	Players
(England) Leeds Rhinos	Rob Burrow, Gareth Ellis, Danny McGuire, Jamie Peacock (c), Keith Senior
(Australia) Newcastle Knights	Brian Carney (vc)
(England) St Helens R.F.C.	Lee Gilmour, Leon Pryce, James Roby, Paul Wellens, Jon Wilkin, Sean Long
(England) Bradford Bulls	Terry Newton
(England) Wigan Warriors	Stuart Fielden, Gareth Hock, Sean O'Loughlin
(England) Warrington Wolves	Martin Gleeson, Paul Wood
(England) Hull	Richard Horne, Gareth Raynor, Kirk Yeaman, Garreth Carvell
(Australia) Sydney Roosters	Adrian Morley
(England) Salford City Reds	Andy Coley
(England) Huddersfield Giants	Martin Aspinwall

==== New Zealand ====
Coach: Brian McClennan (Auckland Lions)

Club	Players
(Australia) Bulldogs	Roy Asotasi
(Australia) Melbourne Storm	Adam Blair, David Kidwell
(England) St Helens R.F.C.	Jason Cayless
(Australia) Parramatta Eels	Nathan Cayless
(Australia) South Sydney Rabbitohs	David Fa'alogo
New Zealand Warriors	Awen Guttenbeil, Brent Webb, Ruben Wiki (Captain), Epalahame Lauaki, Simon Mannering, Jerome Ropati, Manu Vatuvei, ~~Nathan Fien~~ and Lance Hohaia
(England) Wakefield Trinity Wildcats	~~David Solomona~~
(Australia) Sydney Roosters	Iosia Soliola
(France) Catalans Dragons	Stacey Jones
(England) Bradford Bulls	Shontayne Hape
(Australia) Wests Tigers	Dene Halatau
(Australia) Penrith Panthers	Frank Pritchard, Tony Puletua
(Australia) Manly Warringah Sea Eagles	Steve Matai
(Australia) Cronulla Sharks	Nigel Vagana
(England) Hull F.C.	Motu Tony
(Australia) Brisbane Broncos	Tame Tupou

== Venues ==
The games were played at the following venues in Australia and New Zealand. The tournament final was played in Sydney.

Sydney	Auckland	Melbourne
Sydney Football Stadium	Mount Smart Stadium	Telstra Dome
Capacity: 42,500	Capacity: 30,000	Capacity: 56,347
Christchurch	Wellington	Brisbane
Jade Stadium	Westpac Stadium	Suncorp Stadium
Capacity: 38,628	Capacity: 34,500	Capacity: 52,500

== Standings ==
Team	Played	Won	Drew	Lost	For	Against	Difference	Points
Australia	4	3	0	1	95	66	+29	6
New Zealand	4	2	0	2	85	68	+19	4
Great Britain	4	1	0	3	51	97	−46	2^{1}

== Fixtures ==
=== Group stage ===
14 October 2006
20:00 NZST

New Zealand	18–30	Australia
Tries: Nigel Vagana; Jerome Ropati; Manu Vatuvei; Goals: Stacey Jones (3/3)	Report	Tries: Karmichael Hunt 2 Mark Gasnier; Mark O'Meley; Greg Inglis; Goals: Johnathan Thurston (5/6)

Mt Smart Stadium, Auckland
Attendance: 17,887
Referee: Ashley Klein (Australia)

21 October 2006
20:00 AEST

Australia	20–15	New Zealand
Tries: Greg Inglis 2 Mark Gasnier; Goals: Johnathan Thurston (4/4)	Report	Tries: Iosia Soliola 2 Shontayne Hape; Goals: Stacey Jones (1/3); Field Goal: Stacey Jones

Telstra Dome, Melbourne
Attendance: 30,732
Referee: Ashley Klein (Australia)

28 October 2006
20:00 NZST

New Zealand	18–14	Great Britain
Tries: Brent Webb; Motu Tony; Iosia Soliola; Goals: Stacey Jones (3/3)	Report	Tries: Paul Wellens; Gareth Ellis; Goals: Sean Long 2/2; Danny McGuire (1/1)

Jade Stadium, Christchurch
Attendance: 17,005
Referee: Paul Simpkins (Australia)

This match was discounted after New Zealand were found guilty of fielding an ineligible player.

4 November 2006
20:00 AEDT

Australia	12–23	Great Britain
Tries: Greg Inglis; Darren Lockyer Goals: Darren Lockyer (2/2)	Report	Tries: Paul Wellens; Jamie Peacock; Lee Gilmour; Gareth Raynor; Goals: Sean Long (3/5); Field Goal: Sean Long

Sydney Football Stadium, Sydney
Attendance: 24,953
Referee: Ashley Klein (Australia)

Australia	Position	Great Britain
1 Karmichael Hunt	FB	1 Paul Wellens
2 Brent Tate	WG	2 Brian Carney
3 Mark Gasnier	CE	3 Keith Senior
4 Jamie Lyon	CE	4 Kirk Yeaman
5 Greg Inglis	WG	5 Gareth Raynor
6 Darren Lockyer (c)	FE/SO	6 Leon Pryce
7 Ben Hornby	HB	7 Sean Long
8 Mark O'Meley	PR	8 Stuart Fielden
9 Shaun Berrigan	HK	9 Terry Newton
10 Petero Civoniceva	PR	10 Jamie Peacock (c)
11 Willie Mason	SR	11 Gareth Ellis
12 Nathan Hindmarsh	SR	12 Gareth Hock
13 Luke O'Donnell	LK	13 Sean O'Loughlin
14 Cameron Smith	Bench	14 James Roby
15 Anthony Tupou	Bench	15 Adrian Morley
16 Brent Kite	Bench	16 Lee Gilmour
17 Sam Thaiday	Bench	17 Jon Wilkin
Ricky Stuart	Coach	Brian Noble

During the first minutes of the match Australian forward Willie Mason punched Stuart Fielden, breaking his nose and sparking a brawl, and later took Sean Long out after kicking, leading with an elbow which left Long's head bloodied and bandaged for the rest of the match. He was later charged for his punch on Fielden and had to face a Rugby League International Federation disciplinary committee the following Monday, where he was fined AUD$5000 and suspended for one game. After almost thirty minutes the Australians opened the scoring when, defending within their own ten-metre line, their scrum-half back Ben Hornby intercepted a pass and ran twenty metres before giving the ball on to winger Greg Inglis to run the remaining seventy to the line and score under the posts. Lockyer converted the try so it was 6 - 0 in favour of the Kangaroos. A few minutes later Irish winger Brian Carney left the field with a hamstring injury and was replaced by Lee Gilmour. Then Great Britain struck back with scrum-half-back Sean Long dummying his way through the defence thirty-five metres from the line then passing back inside to fullback Paul Wellens to score. Long then converted the try, so the scores were level at 6 all at the break.

On the other side of half-time, the Lions scored after about two minutes from close range when forward Jamie Peacock barged his way through the defence and over the line. The video referee gave the try 'benefit of the doubt' and Sean Long's kick didn't miss, so the score was 12 - 6 in favour of Great Britain. The Australians hit back with another long range try, the ball being moved out to Inglis on the left wing to make a break down the sideline before passing back inside to five-eighth Darren Lockyer to finish the run to the line and touch down behind the uprights. Lockyer then converted, levelling the score at 12 - 12. About ten minutes later the British struck back when Lee Gilmour hit a gap twenty metres out and ran through to dive over beneath the sticks. Sean Long converted so the Lions regained the lead at 18 - 12. With just over ten minutes remaining Great Britain got an opportunity to put themselves in front by more than a converted try when they were awarded a penalty, but Long's kick missed. Shortly after he got a chance to make amends with a drop goal but missed. However, with less than five minutes remaining he helped seal the match when he kicked a loose pass fifteen metres from his own goal-line downfield and chased after it, regathering and running just over the half-way line before passing it James Roby in support who couldn't outrun Nathan Hindmarsh. From the play-the-ball twenty metres away from Australia's goal-line, the British moved the ball through the hands out to the other side of the field to winger Gareth Raynor who dived over in the corner. Long's conversion attempt struck the post and missed, but he later kicked a field goal in the final minutes to make it a 23 - 12 victory, Great Britain's first in Australia since their 1992 tour.

11 November 2006
20:00 NZST

New Zealand	34–4	Great Britain
Tries: Brent Webb 2 Nigel Vagana; Ruben Wiki; Nathan Cayless; Manu Vatuvei; Goals: Stacey Jones (5/6)	Report	Tries: Gareth Ellis

Westpac Stadium, Wellington
Attendance: 16,401
Referee: Paul Simpkins (Australia)

18 November 2006
20:00 AEST

Australia	33–10	Great Britain
Tries: Darren Lockyer; Mark Gasnier; Karmichael Hunt; Justin Hodges; Anthony Tupou; Brent Tate; Goals: Johnathan Thurston (4/6); Field Goal: Darren Lockyer	Report	Tries: Keith Senior; Danny McGuire; Goals: Paul Wellens (1/1)

Suncorp Stadium, Brisbane
Attendance: 44,358
Referee: Paul Simpkins (Australia)

This was the last match to be played against Australia by Great Britain before they split into England, Wales and Scotland.

=== Final ===
25 November 2006
20:00 AEDT
Final

Australia	16–12 (after golden point)	New Zealand
Tries: Brent Tate; Darren Lockyer; Goals: Johnathan Thurston (4/4)	Report	Tries: Frank Pritchard; Iosia Soliola; Goals: Stacey Jones (2/4)

Sydney Football Stadium, Sydney
Attendance: 27,325
Referee: Ashley Klein (Australia)

Australia	Position	New Zealand
Karmichael Hunt	FB	Brent Webb
Brent Tate	WG	Shontayne Hape
Mark Gasnier	CE	Iosia Soliola
Justin Hodges	CE	Steve Matai
Greg Inglis	WG	Manu Vatuvei
Darren Lockyer (c)	FE	Nigel Vagana
Johnathan Thurston	HB	Stacey Jones
Brent Kite	PR	Ruben Wiki (c)
Cameron Smith	HK	Dene Halatau
Petero Civoniceva	PR	Roy Asotasi
Nathan Hindmarsh	SR	David Kidwell
Andrew Ryan	SR	Simon Mannering
Luke O'Donnell	LK	David Fa'alogo
Willie Mason	Int	Motu Tony
Mark O'Meley	Int	Nathan Cayless
Shaun Berrigan	Int	Adam Blair
Anthony Tupou	Int	Frank Pritchard
Ricky Stuart	Coach	Brian McClennan

Early penalties for infringements in the ruck by the Kiwis, gave Australia an early two points from a Johnathan Thurston kick. The Kangaroos then mirrored this, conceding consecutive penalties that allowed Stacey Jones' goal a few minutes later to even the scores at 2 all. In the tenth minute Australia had the ball in the centre of the field and passed it out to Mark Gasnier who made a break down the right then passed to his winger Brent Tate to finish. Thurston's conversion was successful, so the home side led 8 - 2. Another penalty in the ruck in the twenty-first minute led to a minor scuffle and a goal from Thurston, extending the Kangaroos' lead to 10 - 2. Five minutes later New Zealand were ten metres into the Australians' half when Stacy Jones put a little chip kick over the heads of the Kangaroos for Brent Webb to run through and catch before drawing the defence and passing it on to Frank Pritchard who diver over untouched in the left corner. Jones missed the difficult conversion attempt, leaving the score 10 - 6 in favour of Australia. In the remaining ten minutes of play before half-time no more points were scored.

After five minutes the Kiwis had made their way down to Australia's ten-metre line when they moved the ball through the hands out to the right where Nigel Vagana threw a short ball back inside for Iosia Soliola charging through to score. The scores were level at 10 - 10 and Stacy Jones' kick missed. A few minutes later Australia were given a penalty and Thurston kicked for goal, regaining his side's lead 12 - 10. In the sixty-ninth minute the Kiwis picked up a penalty in front of the posts and Jones kicked it this time, levelling the scores at 12 - 12. The Kangaroos then survived several raids on their try-line and two field goal attempts before a Cameron Smith 40-20 kick brought them up to New Zealand's end with two minutes remaining where Thurston missed a drop goal attempt as well. Jones had another shot in the final minute, and Australia nearly scored a miraculous fifty-metre try, but the match was destined for golden point extra time.

The first five-minute period of extra time featured a missed field goal attempt each from Lockyer, then Jones. The teams then changed ends and started again. After eighty-seven minutes of test football, Australia gained possession of the ball. Thurston then received it thirty-five metres from his own in-goal and dummied his way through the defensive line. After running fifty metres he passed back inside to Darren Lockyer in support who was ankle-tapped on his way to the try-line and stumbled over under the posts, giving Australia a 16-12 golden-point victory.

Kangaroos' ball twenty metres out from their own line, tackle number two. We play until we get points. There is no stoppage from here on in. We're into the 87th minute of play. Smith with the ball, now for Thurston, dummy, Thurston's through. There's support left and right, Lockyer's on the inside, Lockyer...scores the try. The Golden Boot winner, the Brisbane captain, the Queensland captain, the Australian captain has scored the try to win the Tri-Nations final. What a sensational finish sixteen points to twelve.

— Andrew Voss, commentator, Channel 9 (host broadcaster)

Australia's victory regained them the Tri-nations trophy which they had lost to New Zealand in the final of the 2005 series in England. Lockyer, who in 2006 captained Queensland to victory in the State of Origin, winning the Wally Lewis Medal for player of the series, captained the Brisbane Broncos to victory in the 2006 NRL Grand Final, then won his second Golden Boot Award for international player of the year, collected the trophy.

The New Zealand loss brought down the curtain on the test careers of captain Ruben Wiki, who retired as New Zealand's most capped international, as well as Stacey Jones and Nigel Vagana.

== Non-series matches ==
During the series, Great Britain and New Zealand played additional matches to maintain their level of fitness.

20 October 2006

Newcastle Division	6–40	Great Britain

EnergyAustralia Stadium, Newcastle
Attendance: 6,235

4 November 2006

New Zealand	34–4	New Zealand Residents

Wingham Park, Greymouth
Attendance: 4,000

== See also ==
- 2006 in rugby league
