= Carl Doherty =

New Zealand rugby league footballer

Personal information
- Born: 12 July 1975 (age 51) New Zealand
- Height: 185 cm (6 ft 1 in)
- Weight: 82 kg (12 st 13 lb)

Playing information
- Position: Fullback
Club
Years	Team	Pld	T	G	FG	P
1999	Auckland Warriors	5	0	14	0	28
- Source: As of 27 November 2008

Carl Doherty (born 12 July 1975, in New Zealand) is a former professional rugby league footballer. His position of preference was Fullback.

== Playing career ==
A Glenora Bears junior, in 1999 he shot to prominence when he was called up from the local Auckland scene by the Auckland Warriors. He played five games for the club in the National Rugby League during the 1999 season. He was one of several options trialled by the Warriors as they searched for a replacement for the injured Matthew Ridge. However, despite being one of the more successful replacements, he was not re-signed by the club for the 2000 season and instead joined the Mt Albert Lions in the new Bartercard Cup competition.

== Later years ==
In 2002 he competed in the New Zealand Marist Brothers Spillane rugby union tournament for the North Harbour side and was named in the team of the tournament.
