= Nigel Vagana =

Former New Zealand and Samoa international rugby league footballer

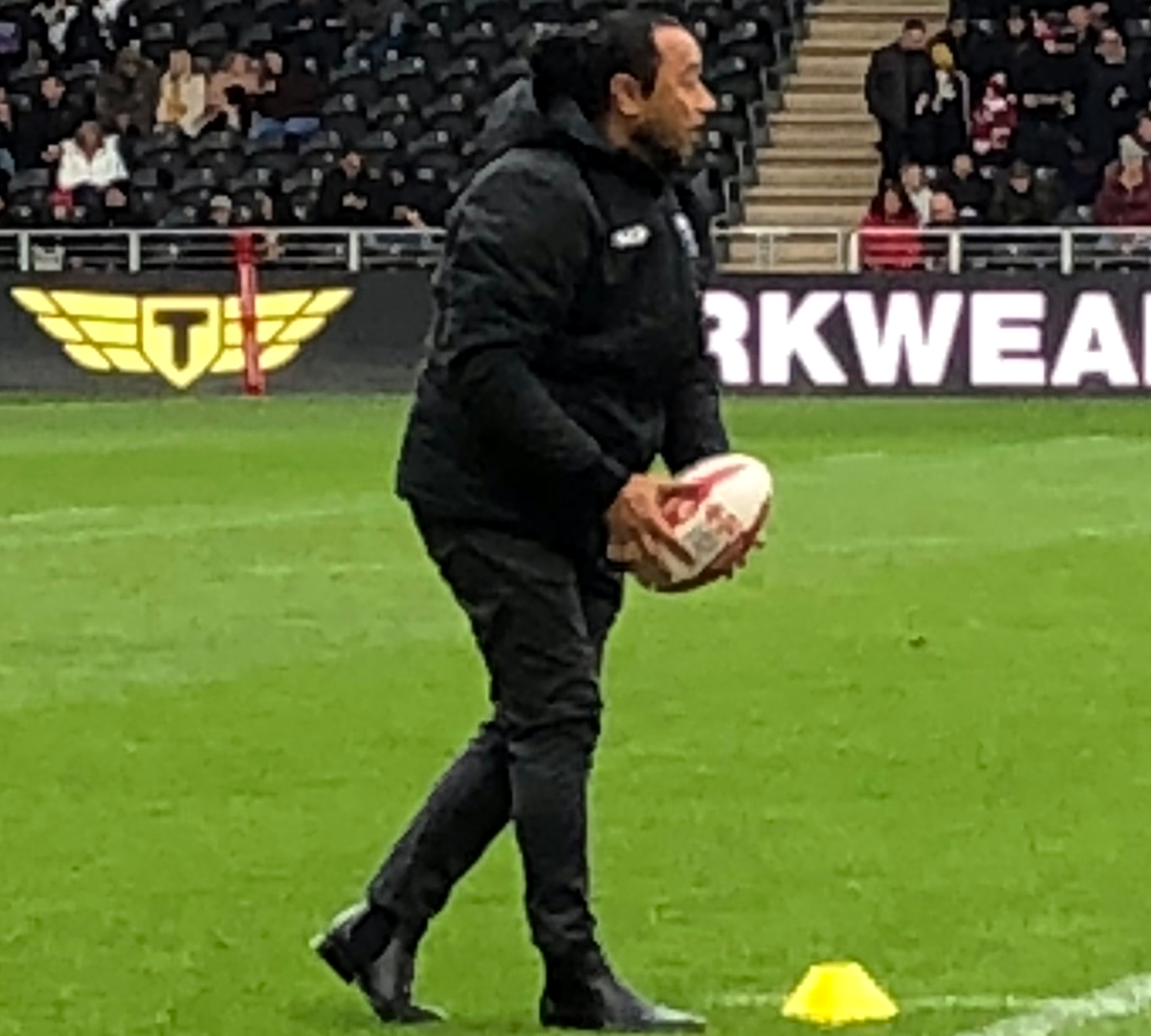

Personal information
- Full name: Nigel Faletoese Vagana
- Born: 7 February 1975 (age 51) Auckland, New Zealand

Playing information
- Height: 183 cm (6 ft 0 in)
- Weight: 87 kg (13 st 10 lb)
- Position: Wing, Centre, Five-eighth
Club
Years	Team	Pld	T	G	FG	P
1996	Auckland Warriors	1	0	0	0	0
1997	Warrington Wolves	20	17	0	0	68
1998–00	Auckland Warriors	70	37	0	0	148
2001–03	Canterbury Bulldogs	76	61	0	0	244
2004–06	Cronulla Sharks	61	32	0	0	128
2007–08	South Sydney	32	10	0	0	40
	Total	260	157	0	0	628
Representative
Years	Team	Pld	T	G	FG	P
1998–06	New Zealand	37	19	0	0	76
2007–08	Samoa	4	4	0	0	16
- Education: St Paul's College, Auckland
- Relatives: Joe Vagana (cousin); Linda Vagana (cousin)

Nigel Faletoese Vagana (born 7 February 1975), also known by the nicknames of "Pablo", and "Chiko", is a former professional rugby league footballer who played in the 1990s and 2000s, as a wing, centre and five-eighth.

A New Zealand and Samoa international representative, Vagana retired as the Kiwis' all-time top try-scorer with 19. (Note: Vagana's 19 tries for the New Zealand national team was surpassed by Manu Vatuvei in 2014.) He represented New Zealand between 1998 and 2006, including at the 2000 World Cup, and captained Samoa at the 2008 World Cup.

Vagana played club football in New Zealand for the Warriors, in England for Warrington, and in Australia for the Canterbury-Bankstown Bulldogs, Cronulla-Sutherland Sharks and the South Sydney Rabbitohs. He is the cousin of his former Warriors teammate Joe Vagana, and also of former Silver Ferns netball player Linda Vagana.

== Background ==
Of Samoan descent, Vagana was born in Auckland, New Zealand on 7 February 1975. Vagana played for the Auckland Colts at fullback in the grand final of the 1995 Lion Red Cup, scoring a try in his side's loss.

== Playing career ==
=== 1990s ===
Vagana was selected as part of the Samoa national team for the 1995 World Cup, but did not play a game. During the 1996 Auckland Warriors season Vagana made his first Premiership appearance for the club at centre. He also was selected in the New Zealand team that competed in the Super League World Nines tournament in Fiji. The side won the title, New Zealand's first world trophy.

Vagana left New Zealand to play in 1997's Super League II season for English club Warrington Wolves at five-eighth. The following year he returned to Auckland and resumed playing at centre for the Warriors in the newly formed National Rugby League alongside his cousin Joe Vagana. He was selected to make his début for the New Zealand national team in the 1998 Anzac Test against Australia from the internchange bench. Vagana finished the 1998 Auckland Warriors season as the club's top try scorer.

Vagana finished the 1999 Auckland Warriors season second only to Stacey Jones in total tries scored for the club. He was selected for the New Zealand team to compete in the end of season 1999 Tri-Nations tournament. In the final against Australia he played on the wing and scored a try in the Kiwis' 22–20 loss. He was the tournament's top try-scorer.

=== 2000s ===
Vagana was selected to play for New Zealand on the wing in the 2000 Anzac Test. He finished the 2000 Auckland Warriors season as the club's top try-scorer. Vagana was then selected in the New Zealand squad for the 2000 World Cup. The Kiwis reached the final against Australia, and he played on the wing in the loss to the Kangaroos.

Vagana commenced playing for Sydney's Canterbury-Bankstown for the 2001 NRL season. At the 2001 Dally M Awards Vagana was named the NRL's centre of the year.

In April 2002, Vagana became the first Canterbury player since 1942 to score five tries in a match. That season he was the League's top try-scorer. At the 2002 Dally M Awards Vagana was named the NRL's centre of the year. He was selected to go on the 2002 New Zealand rugby league tour of Great Britain and France, playing at centre. Clinton Toopi broke his hand in a scuffle with Vagana during a team drinking session after the second test. Team management initially tried to cover up the incident, claiming the injury occurred during the match, before media found out and had a field day. Vagana played in all five test matches of the tour.

During the 2002 NRL season the ladder-leading Canterbury were stripped of 37 competition points and given then-record breaking fines for salary cap breaches, meaning they finished the season with the wooden spoon.

Vagana moved to another Sydney club, the Cronulla-Sutherland Sharks for the 2004 NRL season. He was selected to play for New Zealand at fullback in the 2004 Anzac Test. Vagana finished the 2004 Cronulla-Sutherland Sharks season at the club's top try-scorer. In the post-season 2004 Tri-Nations tournament Vagana was selected to play in the centres for New Zealand in all four of their matches.

Vagana was selected play for New Zealand at centre in the 2005 Anzac Test. At the end of the season he was selected to go to Britain with the Kiwis for the 2005 Tri-Nations tournament, playing at five-eighth in all matches, including the final in which they defeated Australia.

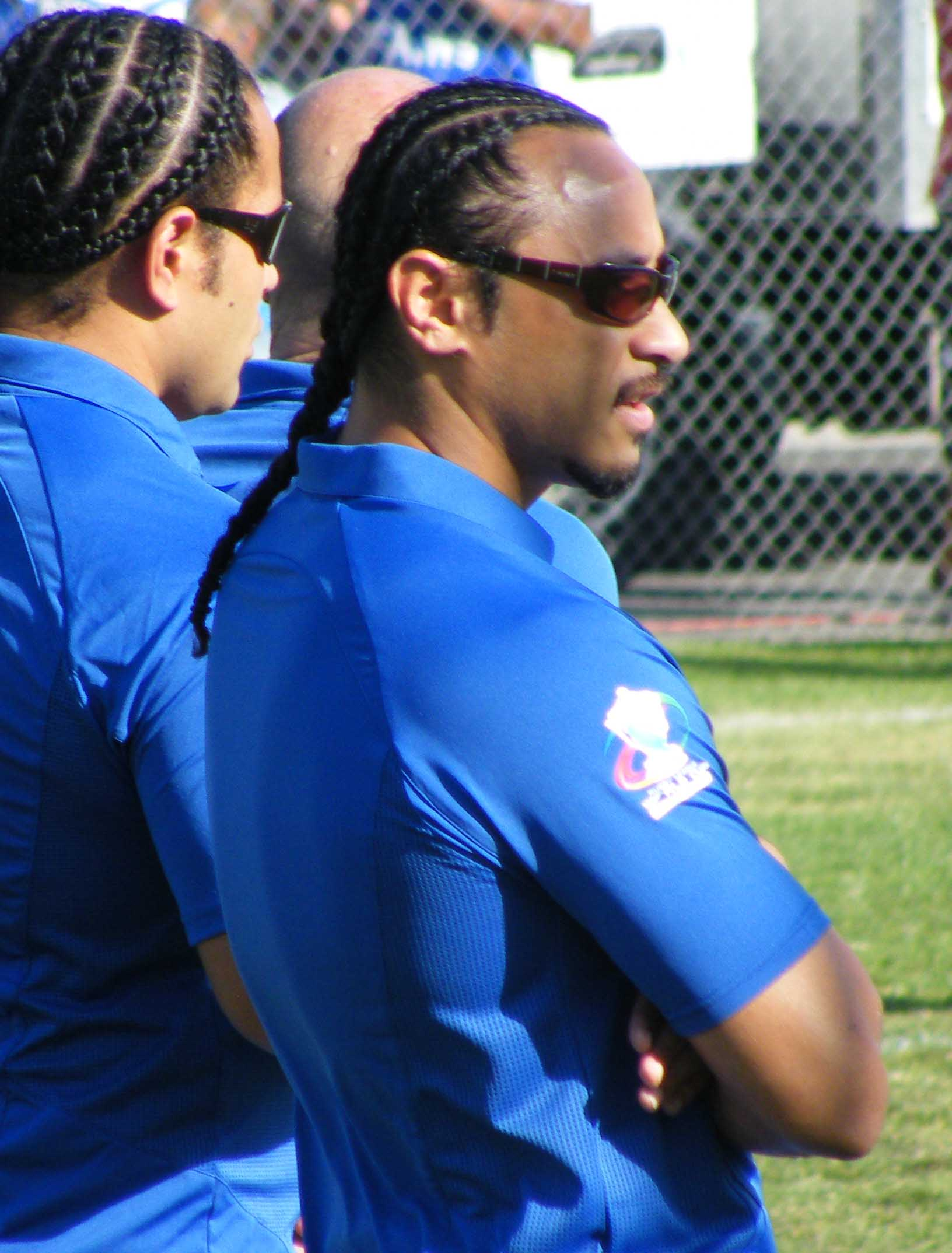
Vagana with the Samoan 2008 World Cup side.

Vagana was selected to play for New Zealand at five-eighth in the 2006 Anzac Test. He was selected to represent New Zealand in the 2006 Tri-Nations tournament, playing at five-eighth in the final which was lost to Australia. Vagana announced his retirement from international rugby league following the 2006 Tri Nations series.

Vagana signed a two-year contract with NRL club South Sydney, starting in 2007, expiring at the end of 2008. At the end of the 2007 NRL season the 2007 All Golds tour took place, celebrating the centenary of the 1907–08 New Zealand rugby tour of Australia and Great Britain, which saw the first games of rugby league ever played in the Southern hemisphere. Vagana came out of international retirement to play for an invitational "All Golds" side against Great Britain. The 2008 season was Vagana's last in the NRL. Although already retired, Vagana was named in the Samoa squad for the post-season 2008 World Cup, and captained the side in the tournament, scoring tries in both their matches.

== Honours ==
- 2001 - Dally M Centre of the Year
- 2002 - Dally M Centre of the Year

== Post playing ==
Following his retirement from the playing field, Vagana became a National Rugby League education and welfare officer.
