= Jason Death =

Australian rugby league footballer

Personal information
- Born: 25 August 1971 (age 55) Young, New South Wales, Australia

Playing information
- Height: 180 cm (5 ft 11 in)
- Weight: 93 kg (14 st 9 lb)
- Position: Hooker, Lock
Club
Years	Team	Pld	T	G	FG	P
1991–95	Canberra Raiders	57	6	0	0	24
1996–98	North Qld Cowboys	45	5	0	0	20
1999–01	New Zealand Warriors	55	11	0	0	44
2002–04	South Sydney	44	0	0	0	0
	Total	201	22	0	0	88
- Relatives: Ivan Cleary (brother-in-law); Josh Stuart (brother-in-law); Nathan Cleary (nephew)

Jason Death (pronounced /diːθ/; born 25 August 1971) is an Australian former professional rugby league footballer who played in the 1990s and 2000s. Primarily a hooker, he played for the Canberra Raiders, North Queensland Cowboys, New Zealand Warriors and South Sydney Rabbitohs throughout his 14-season career.

== Background ==
Born in Young, New South Wales, Death attended Lake Ginninderra College in Canberra, where he represented the Australian Schoolboys in 1989 and 1990, before being signed by the Canberra Raiders. He is the uncle of current Penrith Panthers co-captain Nathan Cleary.

== Playing career ==
In 1989, Death represented the New South Wales under-19 side, starting at second-row in their 22–16 win over Queensland.

=== Canberra Raiders ===
In round 2 of the 1991 NSWRL season, Death made his first grade debut for Canberra in a 48–10 win over the Parramatta Eels. At the end of the season, he was named the club's Rookie of the Year. In 1994, after just 16 games over the previous two seasons, Death played 16 games and featured in the side's qualifying final and preliminary final wins. He missed out on playing in the Grand Final winning side despite being named on the interchange bench. In 1995, Death featured prominently again, playing 21 times, including the club's preliminary final loss to the Sydney Bulldogs.

=== North Queensland Cowboys ===
In 1996, Death joined the North Queensland Cowboys after Tim Sheens, Death's coach at the Raiders who was set to join the Cowboys in 1997, recommended he sign with the club. In his first season with the Cowboys, he played 20 games, starting all but one at hooker. In 1997, Death played just eight games, stuck behind former Raiders' teammate Steve Walters.In June Death was sent home from the clubs World Club Challenge trip to the U.K and fined $10,000 after exposing himself to the Australian Cricket Team in a Leeds hotel. In 1998, his final season in Townsville, he played 17 games, mostly at lock. In Round 22 of the 1998 season, he played his 100th first grade game in a 10–22 loss to the Brisbane Broncos.

=== Warriors ===
In 1999, joined the then-Auckland Warriors, playing 18 games and winning the club's Player of the Year award. In 2001, Death played 21 games for the re-branded New Zealand Warriors, which included playing in the club's first finals game, a 12–56 loss to the Parramatta Eels.

=== South Sydney Rabbitohs ===
In 2002, Death returned to Australia, signing with the South Sydney Rabbitohs, who had just been readmitted into the competition. Death started 23 games at hooker for the Rabbitohs, winning the team's Clubman of the Year award. Over the next two seasons, Death played 21 games before retiring at the end of the 2004 season. In Round 9 of the 2004 season, Death played his 200th game, a 4–38 loss to the Penrith Panthers.

== Achievements and accolades ==
=== Individual ===
Canberra Raiders Rookie of the Year: 1991
New Zealand Warriors Player of the Year: 1999
South Sydney Rabbitohs Clubman of the Year: 2002, 2003

== Statistics ==
=== NSWRL/ARL/Super League/NRL ===
Season	Team	Matches	T	G	GK %	F/G	Pts
1991	Canberra	4	0	0	—	0	0
1992	Canberra	9	0	0	—	0	0
1993	Canberra	7	0	0	—	0	0
1994	Canberra	16	4	0	—	0	16
1995	Canberra	21	2	0	—	0	8
1996	North Queensland	20	3	0	—	0	12
1997	North Queensland	8	2	0	—	0	8
1998	North Queensland	17	0	0	—	0	0
1999	Auckland	18	4	0	—	0	16
2000	Auckland	16	5	0	—	0	20
2001	Warriors	21	2	0	—	0	8
2002	South Sydney	23	0	0	—	0	0
2003	South Sydney	13	0	0	—	0	0
2004	South Sydney	8	0	0	—	0	0
Career totals		201	22	0	—	0	88

== Personal life ==
Death is the brother-in-law of former Warriors teammate Ivan Cleary and Josh Stuart, as Death and Cleary are married to Stuart's sisters. Death's nephew, Nathan Cleary, is a New South Wales State of Origin representative.

In April 2026, Death had a serious fall which fractured his skull and caused bleeding on the brain.
