= Jason Bell (rugby league) =

Australian rugby league footballer

Personal information
- Born: 2 August 1971 (age 55) Fairfield, New South Wales, Australia

Playing information
- Height: 173 cm (5 ft 8 in)
- Weight: 79 kg (12 st 6 lb; 174 lb)
- Position: Five-eighth
Club
Years	Team	Pld	T	G	FG	P
1989–92	Parramatta Eels	53	17	0	1	69
1993	North Sydney Bears	1	0	0	0	0
1994–96	South Sydney	58	13	0	1	53
1997–99	Parramatta Eels	53	6	0	0	24
2000	Auckland Warriors	8	0	0	0	0
	Total	173	36	0	2	146

Jason Bell is an Australian former professional rugby league footballer who played in the 1980s, 1990s and 2000s in the National Rugby League. His position of preference was at five-eighth.

== Parramatta ==
A Parramatta junior, Bell made his first-grade debut in 1989 at the age of 17. He played 53 games for Parramatta before transferring to North Sydney at the start of the 1993 season. However, he only played one first-grade game for Norths during the 1993 season.

== Souths ==
Bell rejuvenated his career by moving across the harbour to South Sydney. He played 58 games in three years for the Rabbitohs, and was regarded as a senior player by the time he was 24, forming a solid halves combination with Craig Field.

== Return to the Eels ==
His strong form at South Sydney gave him the opportunity to return home to Parramatta, and he went on to play another 53 games for the club. In 1997, he won the club's Jack Boyle Tackling School Award, which is awarded to the club's best tackler each season. In 1998, Bell played 22 games for Parramatta and was a member of the side which nearly made the grand final but suffered defeat to Canterbury in the preliminary final. With less than ten minutes to left the clock, Parramatta had been winning 18-2, but lost the game 32–20 in extra time.

By 1999, however, Bell was struggling to make first grade and instead captained the Eels’ reserve-grade team to a win in the NSWRL First Division Grand Final.

== Final years ==
Bell was not re-signed by Parramatta for 2000 and instead joined the Newtown club in the NSWRL First Division. Newtown had a feeder relationship with the Auckland Warriors, and mid-season injuries to Stacey Jones and John Simon saw him signed by the Warriors. Bell played eight games to finish off the season for the Warriors.

At the end of the 2000 season, the Warriors were sold and the new owners opted not to re-sign Bell.

== Sources ==
- Alan Whiticker & Glen Hudson (2007). The Encyclopedia of Rugby League Players. Wetherill Park, New South Wales: Gary Allen Pty Ltd. ISBN 978-1-877082-93-1.
