= Scott Coxon =

Australian rugby league footballer

Personal information
- Full name: Scott Coxon
- Born: 10 October 1973 (age 52) Newcastle, New South Wales, Australia
- Height: 181 cm (5 ft 11 in)
- Weight: 93 kg (14 st 9 lb)

Playing information
- Position: Second-row
Club
Years	Team	Pld	T	G	FG	P
1998–99	Western Suburbs	39	6	0	0	24
2000	Auckland Warriors	12	1	0	0	4
	Total	51	7	0	0	28
- Source: As of 29 January 2019

Scott Coxon (born 10 October 1973) is a former professional rugby league footballer who played professionally in the National Rugby League competition. His position of preference was in the Second Row.

== Playing career ==
A Newcastle junior, Coxon played for the Knights' President's Cup and reserve grade sides but could not break into the first grade side. Seeking first grade opportunities, Coxon moved to the Western Suburbs Magpies in 1998.

Over the next two years Coxon ended up making 39 first grade appearances in the National Rugby League. Coxon played in Wests final ever game as a first grade side which was a 60–16 loss against Auckland at Campbelltown Stadium. However, when the club merged with Balmain to form the Wests Tigers for the 2000 season, Coxon was not required for the new team.

Coxon then moved across the Tasman to join the Auckland Warriors for the 2000 season. Coxon played 12 games for the Warriors. When he was not selected for the first grade side he played in the Bartercard Cup for the Hibiscus Coast Raiders. The club was sold at the end of the year and he was not re-signed by the new owners for the 2001 season. Instead, Coxon moved back to Newcastle, where he spent 2001 playing for the Knights' First Division side.
