= Matthew Spence =

New Zealand rugby league footballer and coach

Personal information
- Born: 7 April 1976 (age 50) Bay of Plenty, New Zealand

Playing information
- Height: 191 cm (6 ft 3 in)
- Weight: 98 kg (15 st 6 lb)
- Position: Second-row
Club
Years	Team	Pld	T	G	FG	P
1995–98	Parramatta Eels	35	4	0	0	16
1999	Western Suburbs	15	1	0	0	4
2000	Auckland Warriors	18	3	0	0	12
	Total	68	8	0	0	32

Matthew Spence (born 7 April 1976) is a former professional rugby league footballer and coach. His position of preference was in the second row, although he also played as prop occasionally.

== Early years ==
Born in New Zealand, Matthew grew up playing for the Turangi Dambusters in the Bay of Plenty competition.

Spence also played for the Junior Kiwis.

== Playing career ==
Spence then moved to Australia, joining the Parramatta Eels and making his first grade debut in 1995. He impressed many in his rookie season and was awarded the Eric Grothe Rookie of the Year award at Parramatta. However he needed a knee reconstruction in 1997 and this injury plagued his next two seasons at the Eels.

He signed for the Western Suburbs Magpies in 1999 and looked to rebuild his career. However, before the season had started he failed a NRL drug test, testing positive for ecstasy. He was the first player to be suspended under the NRL's new drug rules and received a seven-week suspension.

With the Magpies merging with Balmain for the 2000 season he was forced to move clubs again and returned home to New Zealand to play for the Auckland Warriors. He was not re-signed by the new owners in 2001 and retired. When not required by the Warriors in 2000, Spence was assigned to play for the Newtown Jets. He played for the Northcote Tigers in the 2002 Bartercard Cup.

== Later years ==
In 2003 Spence was the player-coach of the new Tihoi club in the Waicoa Bay club competition.

In 2009 and 2010 Spence was the player-coach for the Turangi Dambusters in the Bay of Plenty premier competition, his old junior club.

== Sources ==
- Alan Whiticker & Glen Hudson (2007). The Encyclopedia of Rugby League Players. Wetherill Park, New South Wales: Gary Allen Pty Ltd. ISBN 978-1-877082-93-1.
