= Robbie Mears =

Australian rugby league footballer and coach

Personal information
- Full name: Robert Mears
- Born: 25 September 1974 (age 52) Liverpool, New South Wales, Australia

Playing information
- Height: 173 cm (5 ft 8 in)
- Weight: 89 kg (14 st 0 lb)
- Position: Hooker
Club
Years	Team	Pld	T	G	FG	P
1993–96	Eastern Suburbs	11	1	0	0	4
1997–98	Canterbury Bulldogs	16	7	0	0	28
1999–00	Auckland Warriors	40	10	0	0	40
2001	Leeds Rhinos	24	7	0	0	28
2002–04	Wests Tigers	57	15	0	0	60
2005	Leigh Centurions	14	0	0	0	0
	Total	162	40	0	0	160

Robert Mears (born 25 September 1974) is an Australian former professional rugby league footballer. His usual position was as a hooker.

== Background ==
Mears was born in Liverpool, New South Wales, Australia.

== Early years ==
Mears played for Ingleburn Bulldogs, Eaglevale St Andrews, Campbelltown City Kangaroos, and Austral Rams in the Western Suburbs District Junior League. While attending Campbelltown's St. Gregory's College, Mears played for the Australian Schoolboys team in 1992.

== Australia ==
Mears joined the Eastern Suburbs Roosters in 1993 and made his first grade debut in Round 14, coming off the bench against the Parramatta Eels. However over the next three seasons Mears was only used sporadically by the club and he made just ten more appearances for the Roosters.

Looking for more first grade opportunities, Mears joined the Canterbury-Bankstown Bulldogs in 1997. He started in reserve grade but got an opportunity to play first grade when Jason Hetherington went down injured. In 1998 he was a regular in the reserve grade team and played in the side that defeated the Parramatta Eels' in the Grand Final.

== Auckland Warriors ==
Not wanted by the Bulldogs for 1999, Mears moved into the bush and played for the Ourimbah Magpies in the Country Rugby League Central Coast Division. His form was good enough to make the Country Firsts team for the curtain raiser to the ANZAC Test, where his performance got him noticed by several NRL clubs.

He was signed by the Auckland Warriors after injuries to both Syd Eru and Jason Death, and made his debut for the club in Round 11. He went on to play 40 first grade games for the club over the next two seasons and was a fan favourite. However, with the purchase of the club, but not the players contracts, by Eric Watson at the end of the 2000 season, Mears was left looking for another club.

== Leeds ==
Mears joined the Leeds Rhinos as their final signing for the 2001 season. However he had a horror run at the club, fracturing his collar bone in the first game of the season. While recovering from injury his house was burgled four times. He managed to recover and play 23 Super League games for the club, showing good form and being awarded the Supporters Player of the Year award. However, in the final game of the season he severely fractured his cheek bone after a high shot by Sonny Nickle. Nickle was suspended nine games for the high shot and Mears was awarded damages after a lawsuit. Mears left the Rhinos at the end of the season, unhappy with his treatment at the club.

== Wests Tigers ==
Mears joined the Wests Tigers on a one-year deal for the 2002 season. His return to the NRL proved to be a success and he played 24 games for the Wests Tigers, earning a new contract in the process. Mears played for the Wests Tigers for two more seasons, playing in 33 more games. He was released from his contract at the end of 2004 due to the emergence of Robbie Farah as a hooker at the Tigers.

== Leigh ==
Not retained by the Tigers after the 2004 season, Mears instead joined the Mittagong Lions club in the Country Rugby League Group 6 competition.

In April 2005 Mears returned to England, joining the Leigh Centurions on a one-year contract, with an option for a second year. He replaced an injured Jason Ferris as the quota player of the Centurions. Mears played in fourteen games for the Centurions however they were relegated at the end of the year and he left the club.

== Country Rugby League ==
In 2006 Mears joined the Thirlmere-Tahmoor Roosters in the CRL Group 6 competition. He captained the side and scored their only try in the Grand Final, when they defeated the Picton Magpies 6–0. He also played for the club in 2007 and 2008.

In 2009 Mears joined the Narellan Jets as the head coach. The Jets also play in Group 6.

== Coaching ==
In 2022 Mears coached a Western Suburbs Magpies Under 17 team to win the Harold Matthews Cup. The team was undefeated in their ten matches.
