= Ivan Cleary =

Australian rugby league coach and former rugby league footballer

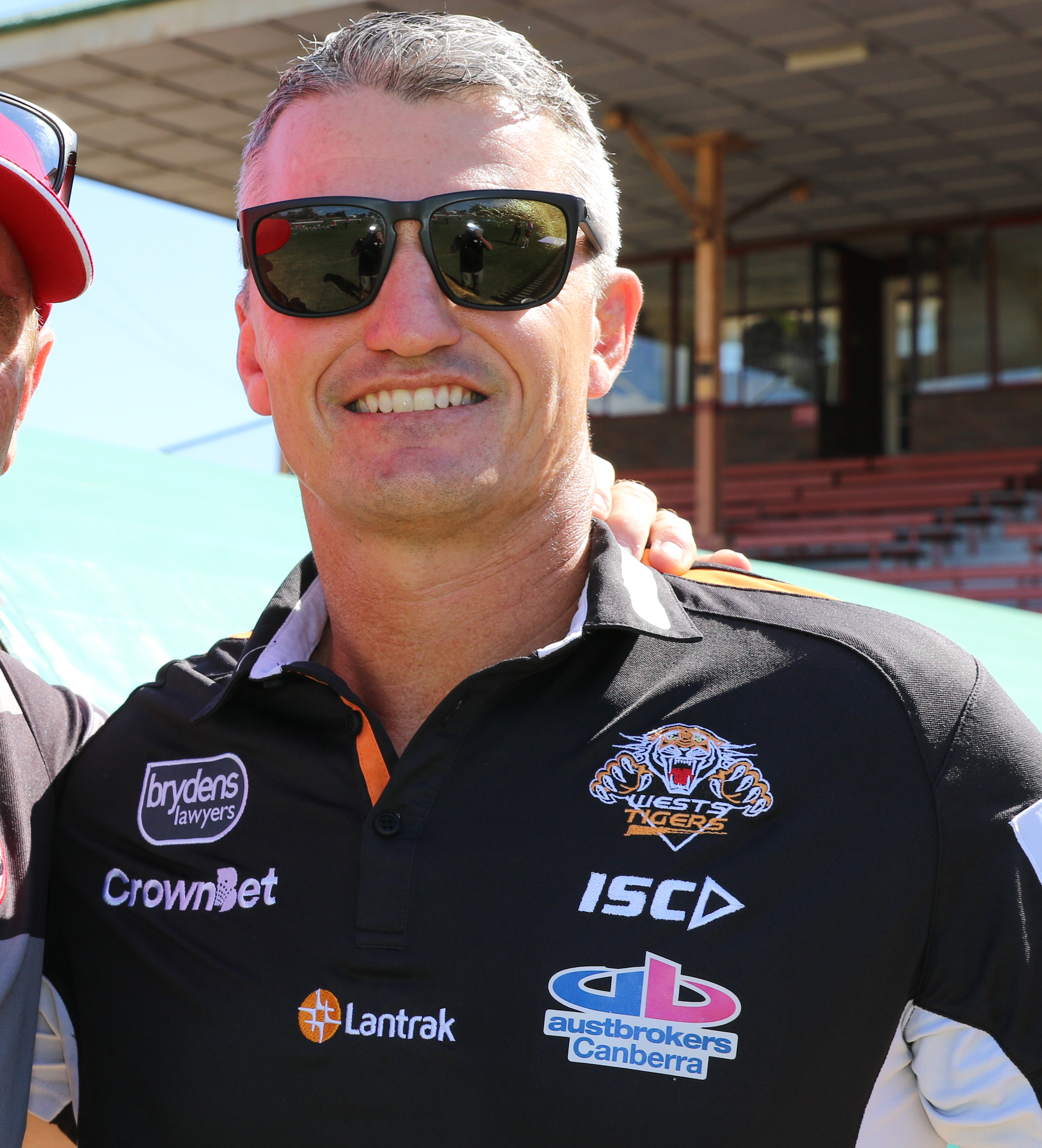

Personal information
- Born: 1 March 1971 (age 55) Sydney, New South Wales, Australia

Playing information
- Height: 182 cm (6 ft 0 in)
- Weight: 89 kg (14 st 0 lb)
- Position: Fullback, Centre
Club
Years	Team	Pld	T	G	FG	P
1992–93	Manly Sea Eagles	15	8	50	0	132
1994–95	North Sydney	37	15	5	0	70
1996–99	Sydney City Roosters	81	29	303	0	722
2000–02	New Zealand Warriors	53	12	195	1	439
	Total	186	64	553	1	1363

Coaching information
Club
Years	Team	Gms	W	D	L	W%
2006–11	New Zealand Warriors	154	77	3	74	50
2012–15	Penrith Panthers	98	44	0	54	45
2017–18	Wests Tigers	43	18	0	25	42
2019–	Penrith Panthers	209	153	2	54	73
	Total	504	292	5	207	58
Representative
Years	Team	Gms	W	D	L	W%
2015	Prime Minister's XIII	1	1	0	0	100
- Relatives: Nathan Cleary (son); Jett Cleary (son); Jason Death (brother-in-law); Josh Stuart (brother-in-law)

Ivan Cleary (born 1 March 1971) is an Australian professional rugby league coach who is the head coach of the Penrith Panthers in the National Rugby League (NRL), Dally M Coach of the year winner, and a former professional rugby league footballer who played as a fullback and centre in the 1990s and 2000s.

He is a former head coach of the Wests Tigers and New Zealand Warriors, as well as the four time NRL Premiership winning head coach of the Penrith Panthers, who led the Panthers to four straight premierships in the 2021, 2022, 2023 and 2024 NRL Grand Finals with the Penrith Panthers, becoming the first coach to do so in the NRL era. As a player, Cleary was a goal-kicking fullback who played club football in Australia and New Zealand, setting a new record for most points scored in a season during the 1998 NRL Premiership. He is the father of Panthers' co-captain Nathan Cleary and Auckland-based Warriors halfback Jett Cleary.

== Early life ==
Cleary was born in Sydney, New South Wales, Australia. He grew up in the Sydney Northern Beaches suburb of Beacon Hill and attended Beacon Hill High School.

== Playing career ==
=== Manly-Warringah Sea Eagles ===
Originally a goal-kicking fullback, Cleary was a Manly-Warringah Sea Eagles junior before moving to play Reserve Grade with the Sea Eagles in 1992 and 1993. He started his first grade career with the Manly-Warringah club in 1992 playing two games before getting his chance after the team's first choice fullback Matthew Ridge suffered a season-ending injury in mid-1993. Cleary filled the fullback spot and also proved himself an accurate goal-kicker, filling in for Ridge on both counts and helping Manly to 4th place and a finals berth where they were bundled out 4–16 by the Brisbane Broncos in the Qualifying Final.

In his 15 first grade games for Manly, Cleary scored eight tries and kicked 50 goals (from 71 attempts for 70.4%) for a total of 132 points.

=== North Sydney Bears ===
With Ridge set to return in 1994 Cleary signed with Manly's local rivals the North Sydney Bears for 1994 and 1995 seasons where he mainly played in the centres due to the emergence of fullback Matt Seers. He also was the team's second choice goal kicker behind Jason Taylor and in 37 games for the Bears he scored 15 tries but kicked only 5 goals (from 6 attempts) for a total of 70 points.

=== Sydney Roosters ===
Cleary began playing for the Sydney City Roosters from the 1996 ARL season through to the 1999 NRL season making 81 appearances for the tri-colours. In 1998, Cleary was the NRL's top point scorer with 284 points.

=== New Zealand Warriors ===
Cleary signed with the New Zealand Warriors for the 2000 NRL season before the fullback retired at the end of the 2002 NRL season following the club's 2002 NRL Grand Final loss against the Sydney Roosters.

== Coaching career ==
After leaving the Warriors, Cleary originally intended to join the Huddersfield Giants in the Super League but instead retired to take up a coaching opportunity with the Sydney Roosters. He was Sydney's NSWRL Premier League head coach in 2003 and 2004, winning the latter premiership.

=== New Zealand Warriors ===
Cleary returned to New Zealand as assistant coach for the 2005 season. In September 2005, Cleary was appointed as the club's head coach.

Cleary coached New Zealand to the 2011 NRL Grand Final against Manly; they lost 24–10. In the following weeks, Cleary announced he was leaving to join Penrith.

=== Penrith Panthers ===
Early season injuries and some poor form from the Penrith Panthers saw a tough start to Cleary's return to Sydney with Penrith sitting 15th after Round 19 of the 2012 NRL season with a 4–13 record. In 2014, Cleary took Penrith to the preliminary final before losing to Canterbury. He was named Dally M coach of the year in the same season. He was released the following season after avoiding the wooden spoon with a final round victory over Newcastle.

=== Wests Tigers ===
He was appointed as the coach of the Wests Tigers on 3 April 2017. In Round 22 of the 2017 NRL Season, Cleary coached the Wests Tigers and coached against his son, Nathan Cleary who was playing for the Penrith Panthers in a losing effort by 28–14.

In the 2018 season, Cleary guided Wests to a ninth-placed finish narrowly missing out on a finals spot. On 11 August 2018 Cleary released a prepared statement ending speculation that he would leave the Wests Tigers to coach Penrith. Cleary said: "I advised the Panthers of my ongoing contract status with the Wests Tigers....I intend to honour this contract". On 28 October 2018, following pressure from Cleary, the Wests Tigers released Cleary from the final two years of his contract. Cleary also sent a departing text message to the Tigers playing group saying "G'day boys I hope this finds you well and enjoying your time off, I was writing to you in the hope of beating the press.. to let you know that I will no longer be your coach at Wests Tigers. "This is an extremely uncomfortable situation for me as I have genuine fondness for the club, and I have loved coaching you all.. I understand that this situation has caused some pain for people that I care about, along with putting the club in an awkward situation... I do not feel good about this. "I would have preferred to do this in person but time and circumstances have made that impossible. I hope we meet again soon and I wish you all the very best in the future. You have my number and I am always open for a chat if you wish."

=== Return to the Penrith Panthers ===
On 29 October 2018, the Penrith Panthers confirmed the return of Ivan Cleary as head coach, on a 5-year deal, beginning in 2019. Ivan linked with his son Nathan Cleary and began his second stint as head coach at the Penrith Panthers.

Cleary's second spell in charge at Penrith got off to a bad start with the club winning only 2 of their first 10 matches leaving the team bottom of the table. Penrith would then go on to win their next 7 games in a row leaving them just outside the finals places. In a must win game against the Sydney Roosters in round 24, Penrith lost the match 22–6 at the Sydney Cricket Ground which meant that the club would miss out on the finals series for the first time since 2015.

In round 8 of the 2020 NRL season, Cleary coached Penrith to a 19–12 victory over the Wests Tigers. Following the full time siren, angry Wests fans shouted abuse at Cleary who was inside the coaches box. Cleary proceeded to wave and blow kisses at the Wests Tigers supporters.

Following Penrith's 28–12 round 13 victory over Canberra in the 2020 NRL season, Cleary questioned the integrity of the referees in the post match press conference by saying he felt Canberra were managed back into the game by the officials. Cleary was later fined $20,000 for his comments.

In round 19 of the 2020 NRL season, Cleary guided Penrith to victory over North Queensland 32–12 at the Queensland Country Bank Stadium. The win was Penrith's 14th in a row and also meant they had claimed the 2020 Minor Premiership, only the third time Penrith had done this in their history. On 19 October, four years since being sacked as being head coach of the Panthers, Cleary was named Dally M Coach of the Year for the second time for his efforts of Penrith's 2020 season.

Cleary guided Penrith to the 2020 NRL Grand Final on the back of a 17-game unbeaten streak. In the final, Penrith's opponents were Melbourne who raced out to a 22–0 lead. Penrith fought their way back into the game during the second half but lost the grand final 26–20.

In 2021, Cleary guided the Penrith club to a comfortable 2nd place, on 44 points. This placing them in the qualifying final against South Sydney, in which Penrith were defeated pushing them back into a knock out final the next week. After defeating both the Parramatta Eels and the Melbourne Storm, Penrith qualified for the 2021 NRL Grand Final being held at Suncorp Stadium on 3 October 2021. The Penrith club, with the guidance of Cleary, won the NRL Grand Final against South Sydney, 14–12. This made Cleary a premiership winning coach for the first time after coaching over 370 NRL games.

In 2022, Cleary won his second NRL Premiership in a row as coach of Penrith when he guided his side to a 28–12 win over the Parramatta Eels in what was considered by many experts to be one of the best all round performances from a NRL side in a Grand Final.

In the 2023 NRL season, Cleary guided Penrith to the minor premiership and also their third straight premiership as they defeated Brisbane 26–24 in the 2023 NRL Grand Final. Penrith became the first team since Parramatta in the early 1980s to win three consecutive premierships. On 24 February 2024, Penrith would lose the 2024 World Club Challenge final against Wigan 16–12 at the DW Stadium in controversial circumstances.

In 2024, he took the Penrith club to their fifth consecutive Grand Final to face Melbourne in a rematch of the 2020 Grand Final. Despite a 23rd minute try to Melbourne's Harry Grant, Penrith answered back when Sunia Turuva scored four minutes later, before eventual Clive Churchill Medalist, Liam Martin put Penrith ahead on the stroke of half time. Melbourne would be left scoreless in the second half to reverse the result of 2020 and hand Penrith and Cleary their fourth Premiership in a row. The first side to do so since St. George in 1966, as well as extending their record in the NRL era. In the 2025 NRL season, Cleary guided Penrith to a 7th-placed finish on the table after enduring a tough start to the season where at one point that club was sitting last. Penrith would eventually reach the preliminary final where they narrowly lost to Brisbane 16-14 which ended their quest for a fifth straight premiership.

On 13 May 2026, Cleary announced he would depart as coach of Penrith at the end of the 2027 season with assistant coach Peter Wallace to take over the role in 2028. The Penrith club confirmed ongoing discussions for Cleary to transition to an advisory role within the club. In the 2026 NRL season, Cleary guided Penrith to yet another minor premiership. The Penrith club would make the preliminary final but suffered a shock loss to Newcastle the previous seasons wooden spooners.

=== Statistics (First Grade) ===
Ivan Cleary – coaching results by season
Team	Year	Games	Wins	Draws	Losses	Win %	Finals
NZL	2006	24	12	0	12	50%	Finished 10th (out of 15)
NZL	2007	26	13	1	12	52%	Lost 2007 NRL Semi Final v North Queensland Cowboys 49–12
NZL	2008	27	15	0	12	56%	Lost 2008 NRL Preliminary Final v Manly-Warringah Sea Eagles 32–6
NZL	2009	24	7	2	15	33%	Finished 14th (out of 16)
NZL	2010	25	14	0	11	56%	Lost 2010 NRL Qualifying Final v Gold Coast Titans 28–16
NZL	2011	28	16	0	12	57%	Lost 2011 NRL Grand Final v Manly-Warringah Sea Eagles 24–10
NZL		154	77	3	74	51%	
PEN	2012	24	8	0	16	33%	Finished 15th (out of 16)
PEN	2013	24	11	0	13	46%	Finished 10th (out of 16)
PEN	2014	26	16	0	10	62%	Lost 2014 NRL Preliminary Final v Canterbury-Bankstown Bulldogs 18–12
PEN	2015	24	9	0	15	38%	Finished 11th (out of 16)
WST	2017	19	6	0	13	32%	Finished 14th (out of 16)
WST	2018	24	12	0	12	50%	Finished 9th (out of 16)
WST		43	18	0	25	42%	
PEN	2019	24	11	0	13	46%	Finished 10th (out of 16)
PEN	2020	23	20	1	2	89%	Lost 2020 NRL Grand Final v Melbourne Storm 26–20
PEN	2021	28	24	0	4	88%	Won 2021 NRL Grand Final v South Sydney Rabbitohs 14–12
PEN	2022	27	23	0	4	88%	Won 2022 NRL Grand Final v Parramatta Eels 28–12
PEN	2023	27	21	0	6	78%	Won 2023 NRL Grand Final v Brisbane Broncos 26–24
PEN	2024	27	20	0	7	74%	Won 2024 NRL Grand Final v Melbourne Storm 14–6
PEN	2025	27	15	1	11	56%	Lost 2025 NRL Preliminary Final v Brisbane Broncos 16-14
PEN		254	163	1	90	64	
Career		451	284	5	201	59%	

== Honours ==
=== Playing honours ===
Sydney Roosters

- NRL Leading Points Scorer: 1998 (284 points)

NZ Warriors

- NRL Grand Final: 2002
- NRL Minor Premiership: 2002

=== Coaching honours ===
Sydney Roosters

- NSW Cup Premiership: 2004

NZ Warriors

- NRL Grand Final: 2011

Penrith Panthers

- NRL Premiership: 2021, 2022, 2023, 2024
- NRL Minor Premiership: 2020, 2022, 2023
- NRL Grand Final: 2020

Individual

- Dally M Coach of the Year: 2014, 2020

Sporting positions
Preceded by Mick Cronin; 1978–1998	Record-holder; Most points in an NRL season 1998–2004	Succeeded by Hazem El-Masri; 2004–
Awards and achievements
Preceded by Trent Robinson	Dally M Coach of the Year; 2014	Succeeded by Wayne Bennett
Preceded by Craig Bellamy	Dally M Coach of the Year; 2020	Succeeded by Craig Bellamy
