= David Mulhall =

Australian rugby league footballer

Playing information
- Position: Fullback, Five-eighth, Halfback
Club
Years	Team	Pld	T	G	FG	P
2000	Auckland Warriors	3	0	1	0	2
2003–05	Toulouse Olympique
	Total	3	0	1	0	2
- Source: As of 14 December 2008

David Mulhall is a former rugby league footballer. His position of preference was at Fullback and he was also a noted goalkicker.

== Playing career ==
Mulhall played for the Souths Magpies in the Queensland Cup competition, captaining the side and scoring over 100 points for the club.

In 2000 he made his debut in the National Rugby League competition for the Auckland Warriors, who had a feeder agreement with the Magpies, starting at Fullback. He made three appearances for the team that year. When he was not selected for the Warriors he returned to the Souths Magpies or appeared for the Newtown Jets in the NSWRL Premier League, as both clubs had feeder agreements with the Warriors.

== Journey Man ==
For the 2001 Season Mulhall was not re-signed by the Warriors and so he moved to the Wests Tigers. He stayed with the squad for two years but did not manage to play another game in the National Rugby League.

In 2003 he moved to France where he signed with the Toulouse club. While he had traditionally been a fullback in France he moved into the halves and often played at halfback or five eighth. In 2005 he was part of the history-making Toulouse side that reached the semi-finals in the Challenge Cup, the first non British side to do so.

== Post Football ==
Since retiring at a young age, David has made a successful conversion into Business. He is currently the General Manager of Australian NRL team, the Wests Tigers.
