= Monty Betham =

New Zealand & Samoa international rugby league footballer

Personal information
- Full name: La’auli Montgomery Junior Betham
- Born: 12 March 1978 (age 48) Auckland, New Zealand

Playing information
- Height: 183 cm (6 ft 0 in)
- Weight: 94 kg (14 st 11 lb)
- Position: Hooker, Second-row, Lock
Club
Years	Team	Pld	T	G	FG	P
1999–05	New Zealand Warriors	101	10	0	0	40
2006	Wakefield Trinity Wildcats	26	2	0	0	8
	Total	127	12	0	0	48
Representative
Years	Team	Pld	T	G	FG	P
2000	Samoa	4	1	0	0	4
2001–06	New Zealand	9	1	0	0	4
- Father: Monty Betham Sr.

La’auli Montgomery Junior "Monty" Betham (born 12 March 1978) is a professional boxer, and former professional rugby league footballer. A New Zealand international representative hooker and lock, he played club football for the New Zealand Warriors in the National Rugby League, and for the Wakefield Trinity Wildcats (captain) in the Super League.

== Background ==
Betham was born in Auckland, New Zealand, on 12 March 1978. His father, Samoan-born Monty Betham Sr., had 53 professional fights as a middleweight or light heavyweight from 1973 to 1982.

== Rugby league career ==
Betham was a Bay Roskill Vikings junior, he was selected to play for Samoa at the 2000 World Cup. Betham went on to change his international allegiance and represent New Zealand in eight tests His position of choice was at lock but he also played at hooker and second-row. On the field Betham was known for his aggressive style of play. He was once voted the player that the opposition players least want to pick a fight with in an NRL players' poll.

Betham missed New Zealand's first ever finals appearance during the 2001 NRL season and the 2002 NRL Grand Final due to injury. Betham's final game for the club was a 22–20 victory over Manly at Brookvale Oval in round 25 of the 2005 NRL season. Betham spent one year in England with Wakefield Trinity during the 2006 Super League season.

=== Highlights ===
- Junior Club: Papatoetoe & Bay Roskill
- First Grade Debut: Round 1, Auckland v Sydney City at Aussie Stadium, 8 March 1999
- Career Stats: 101 career games to date scoring 10 tries
- Professional Boxing Debut: On 31 March 2006 Monty defeated Vai Toevai via sixth-round KO in Apia, Samoa.
- Professional Boxing Record - 5–0–0

== Boxing career ==
In December 2006, Betham announced his retirement from rugby league in order to pursue a career in boxing. Betham will start out in the cruiserweight division and hopes to work his way down to light heavyweight.

His first fight took place in Samoa on 31 March 2007. He defeated 15 fight veteran Vai Toevai in the sixth round.

In 2013, an episode of The X Factor (New Zealand series 1) was filmed at Boxing Alley gym featuring Monty Betham and contestant Whenua Patuwai.

As well as being a professional boxer, he also trained Daniella Smith who went on to become IBF World Champion.

== Professional boxing record ==
8 Wins (5 knockouts, 3 decisions), 1 Losses, 0 Draws
Res.	Record	Opponent	Type	Rd., Time	Date	Location	Notes
Win	8–1	(New Zealand) James Langton	UD	10	2015-11-03	(New Zealand) SkyCity Convention Centre, Auckland	Won NZNBF Cruiserweight title.
Win	7–1	(Australia) Adam Hollioake	TKO	4 (4)	2015-03-28	(New Zealand) Horncastle Arena, Christchurch, Canterbury	
Win	6–1	(New Zealand) Carlos Spencer	TKO	3 (4), 0:35	2014-12-06	(New Zealand) Claudelands Arena, Hamilton, Waikato	
Loss	5–1	(New Zealand) Shane Cameron	UD	6	2011-12-03	(New Zealand) Trusts Stadium, Henderson, Auckland	
Win	5–0	(Australia) James Chan	UD	6	2007-08-03	(New Zealand) SkyCity Convention Centre, Auckland	
Win	4–0	(New Zealand) Frank Asiata	UD	6	2007-07-14	(New Zealand) ASB Stadium, Kohimarama, Auckland	
Win	3–0	(New Zealand) Aaron Bartlett	TKO	1 (6), 1:56	2007-06-08	(New Zealand) SkyCity Convention Centre, Auckland City, Auckland	
Win	2–0	(Australia) Trevor Loomes	KO	2 (6), 0:44	2007-04-27	(Australia) Gold Coast Turf Club, Gold Coast, Queensland	
Win	1–0	(New Zealand) Vai Toevai	KO	6 (10), 1:25	2007-03-31	(Samoa) Faleata Sports Complex, Apia, Tuamasaga	Won vacant Samoa Cruiserweight title. Professional debut.

=== Title ===
Regional/International Titles:

- NZNBF Cruiserweight Champion (197 lbs)
- Samoa Cruiserweight Champion (196 lbs)

== Television ==
Betham was runner-up on Season 4 of New Zealand Dancing With The Stars in 2008. Betham is trained by Danny Codling and managed by Mick Watson. In 2007 Betham competed in New Zealand reality show Treasure Island:Pirates of the Pacific. In March 2008 he competed on New Zealand Celebrity Joker Poker, he made it to the final three on the final episode before being eliminated (Shortland Street actor Craig Parker was the overall winner).

=== Dancing with the Stars (New Zealand, Season 4) ===
In December 2007 it was announced that Betham would compete in season 4 of Dancing with the Stars which started in February 2008. On 28 January 2008 it was revealed on The Edge (radio station) that Betham's professional dance partner would be Nerida Jantti (girlfriend of Shane Cortese). On 15 April 2008 he was named runner-up (Temepara George being the overall winner).

=== Filmography ===
- Treasure Island: Pirates of the Pacific (2007)
- Dancing With The Stars (Season 4, 2008)
- Celebrity Joker Poker (16–30 March 2008)

=== The Shopping Channel ===
In October 2012 Betham became one of the inaugural TV presenters on The Shopping Channel (New Zealand), New Zealand's first and only home shopping channel.

=== Monty Betham's Steps for Life Foundation ===
With his sister Chante Betham-Spencer (CEO) he founded Monty Betham's Steps for Life Foundation in 2010 to "Help NZ youth and families in the fight against childhood obesity in NZ".

== Personal life ==
After returning home from competing on Treasure Island, Betham and his wife Jaymie celebrated the birth of their first child, a son. Betham's wife is currently expecting their second child.

Preceded by Megan Alatini & Jonny Williams	Dancing with the Stars (New Zealand) runner up Season 4 (2008 with Nerida Jantti)	Succeeded by Barbara Kendall & Jonny Williams
