= Shontayne Hape =

England rugby union & NZ international rugby league footballer

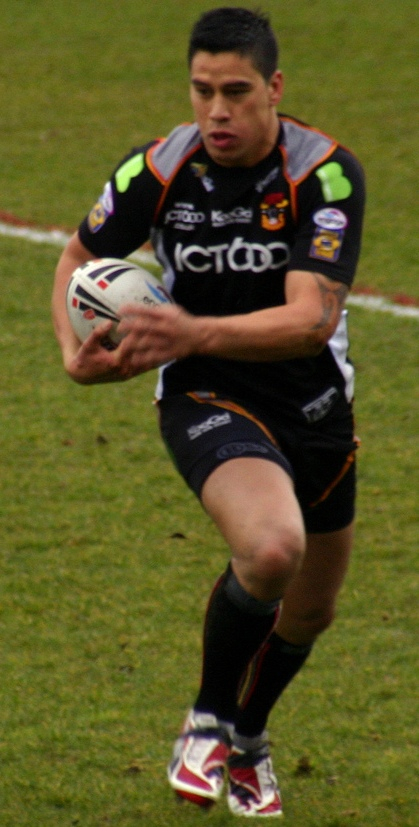

Personal information
- Born: Shontayne Edward Hape; 30 January 1981 (age 45) Auckland, New Zealand
- Height: 1.86 m (6 ft 1 in)
- Weight: 102 kg (16 st 1 lb)

Playing information
- Position: Wing, Centre
Club
Years	Team	Pld	T	G	FG	P
1999–02	New Zealand Warriors	28	9	0	0	62
2003–08	Bradford Bulls	136	85	0	0	340
	Total	164	94	0	0	402
Representative
Years	Team	Pld	T	G	FG	P
2004–07	New Zealand	15	7	0	0
1999–2000	New Zealand Maori	1	1	0	0	4

Rugby union career
- Position: Centre
Senior career
Years	Team	Apps	(Points)
2008–11	Bath	62	(30)
2011–12	London Irish	12	(10)
2012–13	Montpellier	13	(5)
International career
Years	Team	Apps	(Points)
2010–11	England	13	(10)

Shontayne Edward Hape (/ˈhɑːpeɪ/; born 30 January 1981) is a New Zealand born former professional rugby footballer, a dual-code rugby international. He played rugby union at centre for Montpellier, London Irish, Bath and England. He played rugby league for the Bradford Bulls in the Super League and the New Zealand Warriors in the National Rugby League. Hape represented New Zealand at international level rugby league by being selected for both the junior and senior squads, including the 2006 Tri-Nations New Zealand squad. His usual position is centre. He was forced to retire in 2013 after suffering several serious concussions, which left him with decreased brain function.

== Early life ==
New zA Massey High School student, Hape started his rugby education as a Te Atatu Roosters junior, which was coached by his father and managed by his mother. He played for the New Zealand Secondary Schools team in 1998. Hape played for the Glenora Bears in the 2001 Bartercard Cup.

== Rugby league career ==
=== New Zealand Warriors ===
Hape signed for the Auckland Warriors in 1999. In the same year, he played for the Junior Kiwis and New Zealand Māori. In 2000 Hape made his first grade debut for the Warriors and earned the great honour of Rookie of the Year award.

In 2001, the Warriors reached the play-offs and Hape played in the series. In round two of the 2002 season Hape injured his anterior cruciate ligament, which ruled him out for the year and he missed the Grand Final.

=== Bradford Bulls ===
Fellow New Zealander Robbie Paul pointed out Hape to Bradford Bulls, who signed him in 2003. Helped to settle into English life by Paul and his wife, Hape missed only one of the Bulls' 35 games in the 2003 season, scoring 15 tries.

Hape played for the Bradford Bulls at centre and scored a try in their 2003 Super League Grand Final victory against the Wigan Warriors. Having won Super League VIII, Bradford played against 2003 NRL Premiers, the Penrith Panthers in the 2004 World Club Challenge. Hape played at centre in the Bulls' 22–4 victory.

Hape played for the Bradford Bulls at centre and scored a try in their 2004 Super League Grand Final loss against the Leeds Rhinos. A knee injury sustained while playing for New Zealand in the 2004 Tri Nations kept Hape out until round 22 in 2005. His return coincided with the Bulls charge towards the Grand Final and the Super League Championship. His partnership with Lesley Vainikolo is seen as one of the best in the game and has yielded many tries for the Bulls. Hape played for the Bradford Bulls at centre in their 2005 Super League Grand Final victory against Leeds Rhinos

Hape played for New Zealand in their 2005 Rugby League Tri-Nations Final victory over Australia. As Super League champions Bradford faced National Rugby League premiers Wests Tigers in the 2006 World Club Challenge. Hape played at centre in the Bulls' 30–10 victory. In March 2007, Hape was ruled out for most of the season because of a cruciate ligament injury. In August 2007, he was named in Bradford's team of the century. In September 2007, Hape returned for the round 27 Match v Hull F.C. His last game was against Hull Kingston Rovers on 29 June 2008.

=== Representative career ===
In 2004, Hape was chosen to represent New Zealand in the Gillette Tri-Nations, replacing his partner on the wing at the Bulls Vainikolo who was out with a knee injury. Hape played two Tri-Nations games and against France and also represented the Kiwis in the clash with Cumbria.

Hape also appeared for New Zealand in the Tri-Nations series in 2005, where he played a starring role helping New Zealand defeat the Aussies to win the final. In 2006, Hape played in the match against Great Britain in the one-off Test match at St. Helens.

== Rugby union career ==
=== Bath Rugby ===
Hape qualified for the England team on residency grounds, having spent the last six years in England. After Bulls and New Zealand colleague Vainikolo made a successful switch to rugby union with Gloucester, Hape was initially linked with Guinness Premiership-bound Northampton Saints.

In late May 2008, it was announced that he would be joining Bath Rugby on a three-year deal.

=== London Irish ===
Coming to the end of his deal at Bath, the club and player were unable to come to an agreement over a new package. As a result, in February 2011 Hape agreed to join London Irish for the 2011–2012 season, replacing the departing Samoan centre Seilala Mapusua. After representing England in the World Cup in his native New Zealand, on his return he was cited for four weeks for a high tackle, followed by an injury plagued domestic season.

=== Montpellier Hérault Rugby ===
In April 2012 Hape terminated his contract with London Irish and signed with Montpellier Hérault Rugby, and due to multiple concussions in the 2012-2013 season, he was forced to retire and did not play for London Irish again.

=== Representative career ===
On 13 January 2010, Hape was named in the English 32-man squad for the 2010 Six Nations tournament.

On 30 May 2010, he played for England against the Barbarians at Twickenham. where he scored a try. He made his full Test debut for England two weeks later on 12 June in Perth against Australia and appeared again a week later in Sydney in the 2nd Test of that English tour.

Hape was again selected for the 2011 England six nations squad and started in all five matches seemingly sealing his place as a dependable centre for England. Although there was fear that his pairing with Mike Tindall lacked the attacking power that other centres possessed however they made up for it with excellent defence leading to the England winning the tournament although narrowly missing out on the grand slam due to a defeat by Ireland.

Hape was later selected to play in the 2011 Rugby World Cup in New Zealand, although there was doubt on the role he would play in the tournament due to the strong pairing of Mike Tindall and Manu Tulagi he did play in the 41–10 win over Georgia on 18 September scoring 2 tries in the first half.

=== International Tries ===
Try	Opposing team	Location	Venue	Competition	Date	Result	Score
1	Georgia	Dunedin, New Zealand	Otago Stadium	2011 Rugby World Cup	18 September 2011	Win	41 – 10
2	Georgia	Dunedin, New Zealand	Otago Stadium	2011 Rugby World Cup	18 September 2011	Win	41 – 10

== Personal life ==
Hape is married to Liana, a dancer who has performed with Shaggy, Pink and Natalie Imbruglia. The couple have three sons and one daughter, with the youngest son being born after Shontayne retired. As of 2019, Shontayne Hape is a Business Development Manager for EWP Technical Solutions.

His pastime is DJing, which is influenced by rap artists such as Jay-Z and Kanye West. He undertakes under the stage name DJ Shape. Hape performed in Bath in 2009 to assist those affected by the 2009 tsunami that hit Samoa.

In 2023, Hape participated in season 3 of Match Fit, where former rugby league players return to play against the Australian counterparts. He joined in the first season that featured former rugby league stars. He revealed in episode 3 that he suffered his first major concussion when he was 9, but knowledge of concussion, CTE and repetitive head trauma was minimal at the time. Owing to this, Dr John Mayhew advised him against playing contact sports, making him the second person since Rob Cribb in season 1 to be medically barred from playing contact sports.

In 2024, Hape returned to Match Fit: Union vs. League only as a guest so he can deal with his mental struggles away from the programme.

== Statistics ==
=== Club career ===
Year	Club	Apps	Pts	T	G	FG
2000	New Zealand Warriors	13	12	3	-	–
2001	New Zealand Warriors	14	16	4	-	–
2002	New Zealand Warriors	1	-	–	-	
2003	Bradford Bulls	29	48	12	-	–
2004	Bradford Bulls	26	96	24	-	–
2005	Bradford Bulls	12	48	12	–	-
2006	Bradford Bulls	31	84	21	-	–
2007	Bradford Bulls	9	20	5 –	-	-
2008	Bradford Bulls	13	16	4 -	–	–
2008–09	Bath Rugby	17	10	2 -	–	–
2009–10	Bath Rugby	16	15	3 -	–	–
2011–	London Irish	47	810	0-	–	–

=== Representative career ===
Year	Team	Matches	Tries	Goals	Field Goals	Points
2004	New Zealand	4	3	0	0	12
2005	New Zealand	3	0	0	0	0
2006	New Zealand	3	1	0	0	4
2007	New Zealand	3	2	0	0	8
2010	England	3	0	0	0	0
2011	England	1	2	0	0	0
