= John Simon (rugby league) =

Australia international rugby league footballer

Personal information
- Born: 29 May 1972 (age 52); Port Kembla, New South Wales, Australia
- Height: 177 cm (5 ft 10 in)
- Weight: 85 kg (13 st 5 lb)

Playing information
- Position: Halfback
Club
Years	Team	Pld	T	G	FG	P
1990–95	Illawarra Steelers	120	27	30	9	177
1996	Sydney City Roosters	15	5	0	0	20
1997–99	Parramatta Eels	45	12	26	13	113
1999–00	Auckland Warriors	32	2	51	0	110
2001	Wests Tigers	18	4	11	1	39
	Total	230	50	118	23	459
Representative
Years	Team	Pld	T	G	FG	P
1992–97	NSW Country	5	0	2	1	5
1992–97	New South Wales	4	0	2	1	5
1997	Australia	1	0	1	0	2
- Source: As of 8 November 2019

John "Jack" Simon (born 29 May 1972) is an Australian former rugby league footballer who played in the 1990s and 2000s. His club career was spent with the Illawarra Steelers, Easts, Parramatta, Auckland and Wests Tigers. Of Indigenous Australian descent, Simon also represented Australia and New South Wales in Origin.

His brother, Craig Simon, also was a professional rugby league player.

== Playing career ==
A Port Kembla local and Dapto junior, Simon made his first grade debut with the Steelers aged 17 and went on to make 120 appearances for the club between 1990 and 1995. He received the BHP Medal as the Illawarra Steelers' player of the year in 1994.

In 1996 Simon moved to the Sydney City Roosters but was unable to dislodge Adrian Lam from the first grade half spot and he moved to Parramatta for three seasons from 1997 to 1999.

In the 1998 preliminary final against Canterbury, Parramatta were ahead 18-2 with less than 10 minutes to play. After Canterbury scored a try to make it 18-6, Simon had two chances of a field goal that would have given Parramatta the victory but missed both attempts. After missing the second attempt, Simon was substituted off the field by a frustrated Brian Smith. Canterbury went on to win the game 32-20 in extra time.

His apparent lack of fitness found him out of favor with coach Brian Smith and midway through 1999 he gained another release to play for Auckland (he was named captain in his second match with the club).

After two seasons with the Warriors, Simon moved to the Wests Tigers where, despite some good performances for the club, he announced his retirement before the end of the 2001 season citing a lack of enthusiasm. The Tigers had been beaten 64-0 by Melbourne that weekend.

In 2003 Simon was named in the commemorative Illawarra "Team of Steel" celebrating players from 25 years of the club's history.

== Representative career ==
He was selected at half-back for City Firsts in 1991 and 1992 and in game I of the 1992 State of Origin was picked in the run-on side when Ricky Stuart was unavailable due to injury. The Blues won the match but Stuart regained his spot for game II.

It would be another five years before Simon would again wear the Blues' jumper. During the 1997 season, split at both club and representative level due to the Super League war, Simon appeared in all three games, once at half and twice off the interchange bench. Simon was the Blues' hero in game II, landing a 26-metre field goal in the 67th minute that clinched New South Wales' 1 point win.

In 1997, Simon made his sole national representative appearance, selected for Australia in the one-off Test against a Rest-of-the-World side at Suncorp Stadium.

== Post-career ==
After retiring, Simon worked in Aboriginal Education, before buying a Subway in Kiama in 1997. He coached at a local level, including the Illawarra Titans in a Koori knockout competition.

== Sources ==
- Andrews, Malcolm (2006) The ABC of Rugby League Austn Broadcasting Corpn, Sydney
- Whiticker, Alan & Collis, Ian (2006) The History of Rugby League Clubs, New Holland, Sydney
- Big League's 25 Years of Origin Collectors' Edition, News Magazines, Surry Hills, Sydney
