= Ali Lauiti'iti =

New Zealand and Samoa international rugby league footballer

Ali Lauitiiti
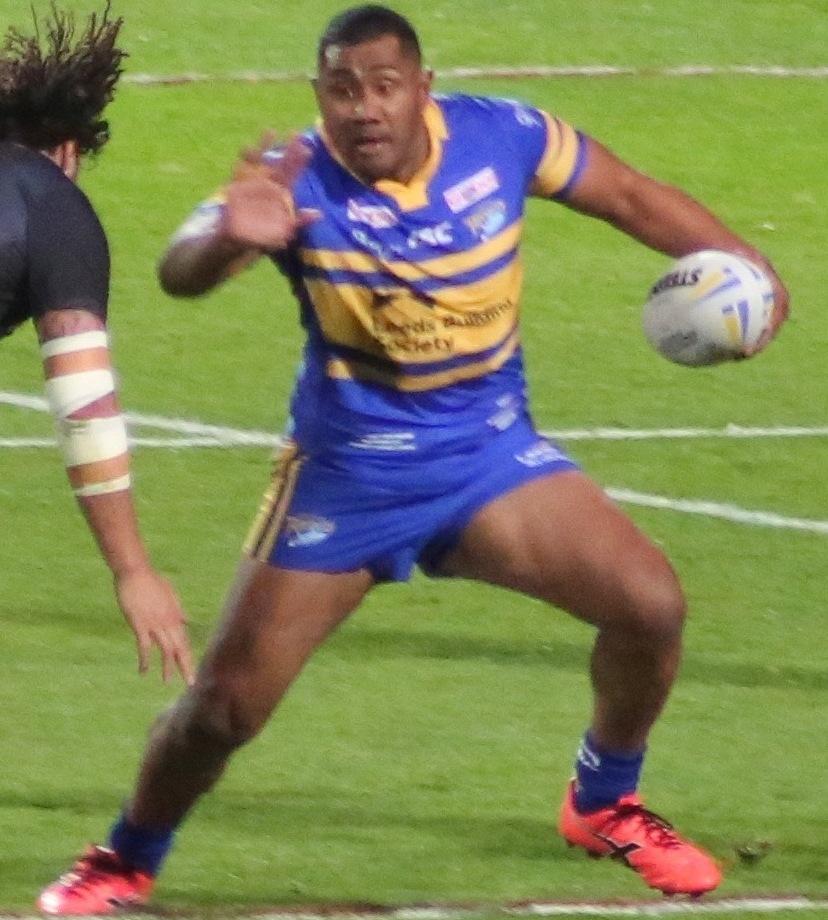

Personal information
- Full name: Alaimatagi Lauitiiti
- Born: 13 July 1979 (age 47) Auckland, New Zealand

Playing information
- Height: 188 cm (6 ft 2 in)
- Weight: 115 kg (18 st 2 lb)
- Position: Second-row
Club
Years	Team	Pld	T	G	FG	P
1998–03	New Zealand Warriors	115	33	0	0	132
2004–11	Leeds Rhinos	200	64	0	0	256
2012–15	Wakefield Trinity Wildcats	86	17	0	0	68
	Total	401	114	0	0	456
Representative
Years	Team	Pld	T	G	FG	P
2000–06	New Zealand	19	7	0	0	28
2007–10	Samoa	4	0	0	0	0
- Relatives: Ivana Lauitiiti (daughter); Ali Leiataua (nephew); Herman Ese'ese (nephew)

Alaimatagi "Ali" Lauitiiti (born 13 July 1979) is a former professional rugby league footballer who played in the 1990s, 2000s and 2010s, as a second-row. He was touted as "The Michael Jordan of Rugby League" in his playing days due to his large hands and athleticism.

Both a Samoa and New Zealand international representative forward, Lauitiiti played for the New Zealand Warriors in the National Rugby League competition and for English clubs Wakefield Trinity Wildcats and the Leeds Rhinos in the Super League. Whilst at the Leeds Rhinos, he was part of their 2004, 2007, 2008 and 2009 championship-winning sides.

== Background ==
Of Samoan descent, Lauitiiti was born in Auckland, New Zealand, on 13 July 1979. He played rugby league football for the Mangere East club in 1996, and shone as a junior in their U19 side in 1997, scoring 17 tries in 19 games. He went on to gain international honours with the Junior Kiwis that year, and again in 1998. He is the uncle of New Zealand Warriors player Ali Leiataua and Hull FC player Herman Ese'ese.

=== Auckland ===
Lauitiiti made his National Rugby League (NRL) début in April 1998 for the Auckland Warriors. He was selected for the New Zealand test squad for the 2000 ANZAC test but missed out on final selection for the match, instead making a try-scoring début against the Cook Islands at Reading in the 2000 Rugby League World Cup. He also scored against Wales in the next game at the Millennium Stadium.

In 2002 he was named the NRL's second-rower of the year. He was an integral part of the Warriors squad that reached the 2002 NRL Grand Final, the first time in the club's history, however they lost the match to the Sydney Roosters. Lauitiiti, who would go on to play 14 times for New Zealand, was part of the Kiwis side that toured Great Britain and France in 2002, featuring in seven out of the eight games on the tour, including all three tests against the Lions, plus games against St Helens, England A, Wales and France. He also scored in the third test against Great Britain.

When Lauitiiti was released from his contract with the Warriors it sparked a worldwide chase for his signature. However, the Leeds Rhinos beat competition from 14 other clubs in Australia and England to secure the second rower. He had appeared in 115 games for the Warriors and scored 33 tries by the time he left the club after the 2003 NRL season.

=== Leeds ===
Lauitiiti joined Leeds in May 2004 on a two-and-a-half-year contract. He made his début for Leeds against Salford and took little time to settle in, scoring his first try in the subsequent game against Bradford Bulls. His incredible ball-handling skills earned him a place in the Tetley's Super League Dream Team in 2004. He played for the Leeds Rhinos at second-row forward in their 2004 Super League Grand Final victory against the Bradford Bulls.

As Super League IX champions, the Rhinos faced 2004 NRL season premiers, Canterbury-Bankstown in the 2005 World Club Challenge. Lauitiiti played from the interchange bench in Leeds' 39–32 victory. In 2005 Lauitiiti scored 14 tries in 32 appearances including 17 as a replacement. His 14 tries includes an incredible five tries against Wakefield when he came off the bench to become the first forward in the summer era to score five tries. He also appeared in the 2005 Challenge Cup Final. He was subsequently named in 2005's Super League Dream Team. He helped Leeds to their second successive Super League Grand Final appearance when he scored the winning try against St Helens with an 80-metre run in the Grand Final Qualifier, then played in the 2005 Super League Grand Final which ended in defeat for Leeds. In the 2005 Tri Nations tournament Lauitiiti once again joined the New Zealand squad and scored a try against Great Britain after coming on from the bench, and was then part of the successful squad who defeated Australia in the historic final victory.

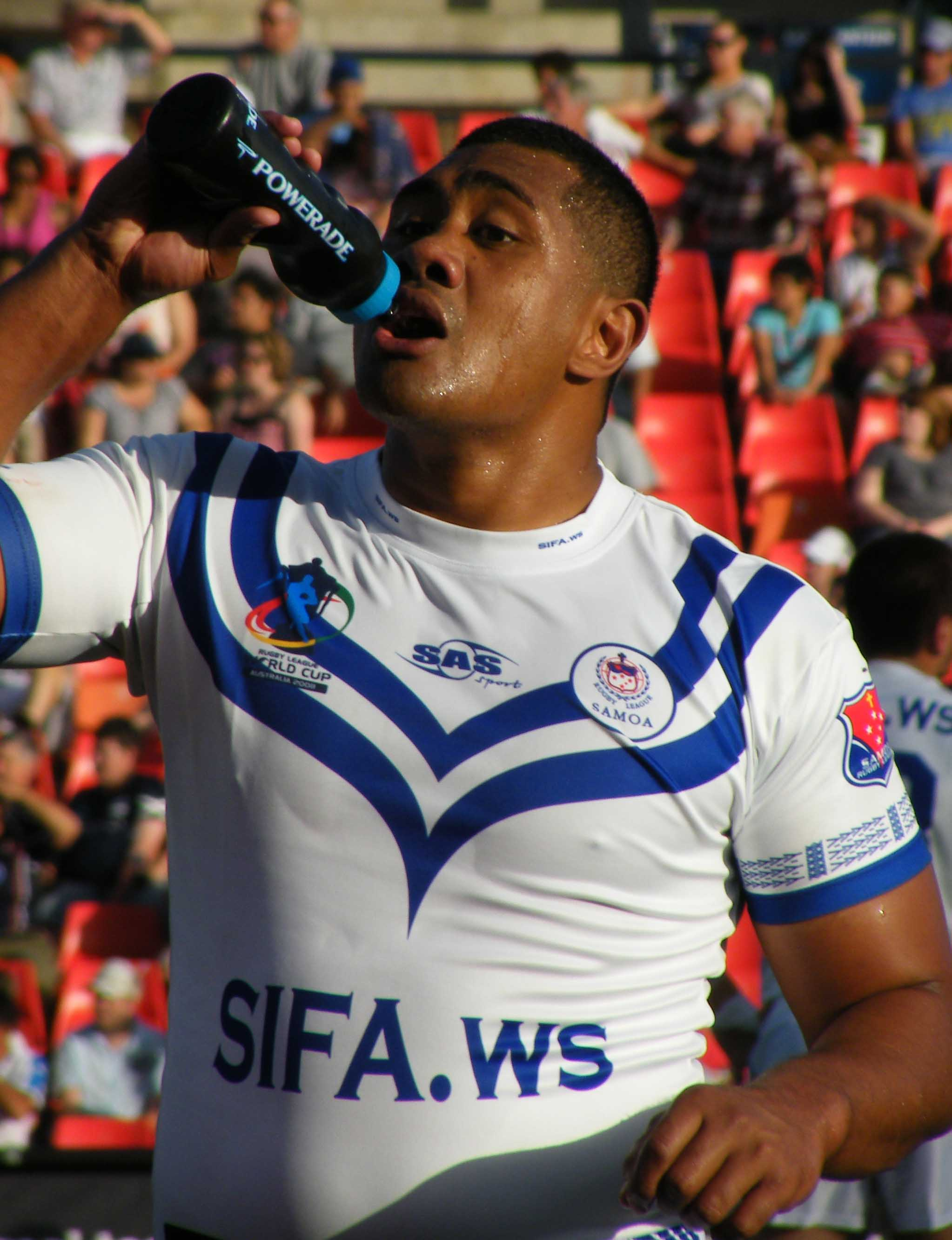
Lauitiiti playing for Samoa in 2008.

Lauitiiti played in Leeds' three Grand Final wins in a row between 2007 and 2009. He was also selected to represent the All Golds side in the match against The Northern Union at the Halliwell Jones Stadium, Warrington in October 2007, scoring two tries in the match. Lauitiiti was named in the Samoa squad for their 2008 Rugby League World Cup campaign.

He played in the 2009 Super League Grand Final victory over St. Helens at Old Trafford.

He played in the 2011 Super League Grand Final victory over St. Helens at Old Trafford.

=== Wakefield Trinity ===
Lauitiiti joined Wakefield Trinity for the 2012 season and remained with the club until the end of 2015.

On 15 October 2015, it was announced that Lauitiiti would play one more time for Leeds in a one-off exhibition match against New Zealand, one of the countries he had previously represented.

=== New Zealand Warriors ===
In November 2015 it was announced that Lauitiiti would return to the New Zealand Warriors, with the signing of a second-tier contract for 2016. He retired at the end of the season.

== Statistics ==
Year	Team	Games	Tries	Pts
1998	New Zealand Warriors	8	4	16
1999	New Zealand Warriors	20	7	28
2000	New Zealand Warriors	19	7	28
2001	New Zealand Warriors	26	3	12
2002	New Zealand Warriors	25	10	40
2003	New Zealand Warriors	12	1	4
2004	New Zealand Warriors	5	1	4
2004	Leeds Rhinos	19	9	36
2005	Leeds Rhinos	33	14	60
2006	Leeds Rhinos	30	7	28
2007	Leeds Rhinos	23	4	24
2008	Leeds Rhinos	24	10	40
2009	Leeds Rhinos	29	6	24
2010	Leeds Rhinos	21	8	32
2011	Leeds Rhinos	21	6	24
2012	Wakefield Trinity	23	8	32
2013	Wakefield Trinity	25	4	16
2014	Wakefield Trinity	17	4	16
2015	Wakefield Trinity	21	1	4
	Totals	401	114	456

== Post playing ==
In 2023, Lauitiiti participated in season 3 of Match Fit, where former rugby players return to play against the Australian counterparts. He joined in the first season that featured former rugby league stars. He revealed he retired from rugby due to arthritic knees, partially made worse by his sweet tooth and liking milk chocolate. He was exempt from doing the Bronco fitness test, the 1.2km aerobic fitness and agility test. He performed a ramp test on an exercise bike instead so body weight and gravity aren't taken into account.

In 2024, he returned for Match Fit: Union vs. League. He lost the IronMaori triathlon challenge as he fell too far behind on the cycling leg. He also admitted his competitiveness has waned due to his body slowing and breaking down. His mind was already drifted away from the game the moment he contemplated leaving the Warriors, and his overseas move was purely a way to earn more money to provide for his growing family.

On 2 February 2024, Lauitiiti had returned to the Warriors as the team's chaplain. In June 2024, Lauitiiti was inducted in the Leeds Rhinos Hall of Fame.

His daughter Ivana Lauitiiti made a try-scoring debut in the NRLW in 2025.
