= Clinton Toopi =

New Zealand dual-code rugby footballer

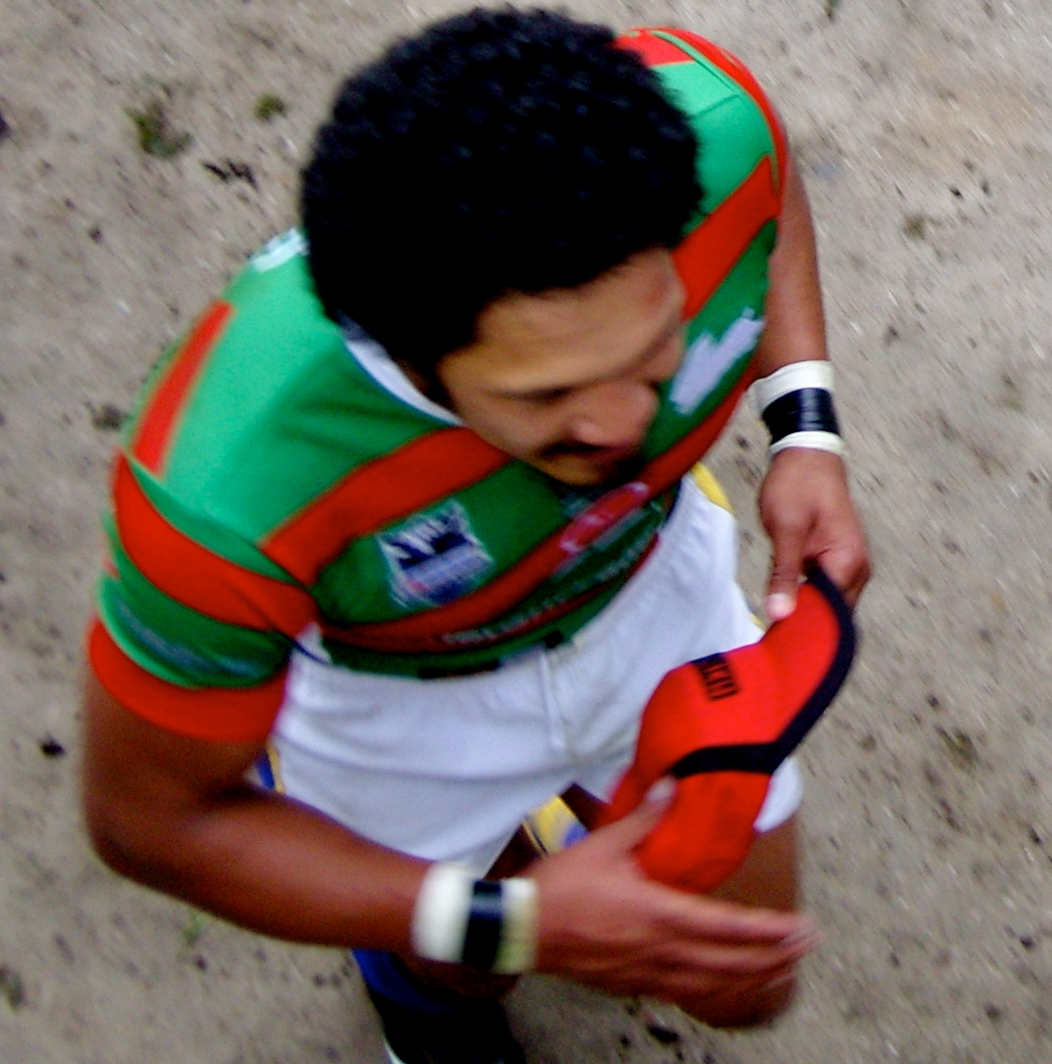

Personal information
- Full name: Clinton James Te-Whata Toopi
- Born: 29 February 1980 (age 46) Stratford, New Zealand

Playing information
- Height: 185 cm (6 ft 1 in)
- Weight: 100 kg (15 st 10 lb)

Rugby league
- Position: Centre
Club
Years	Team	Pld	T	G	FG	P
1999–06	Auckland Warriors	129	57	0	0	228
2006–08	Leeds Rhinos	47	10	0	0	40
2010–11	Gold Coast Titans	27	6	0	0	24
	Total	203	73	0	0	292
Representative
Years	Team	Pld	T	G	FG	P
2000–10	New Zealand Māori	4	2	0	0	8
2001–07	New Zealand	22	11	0	0	44

Rugby union
- Position: Centre
Club
Years	Team	Pld	T	G	FG	P
2009	Bay of Plenty	4	4	0	0	20

Clinton James Te-Whata Toopi (born 29 February 1980) is a New Zealand former professional rugby league and rugby union footballer who played in the 2000s and 2010s. A New Zealand international representative centre, he played his club football in the National Rugby League for the New Zealand Warriors and the Gold Coast Titans, and in the Super League for the Leeds Rhinos. Clinton began coaching the Helensvale Hornets in 2021 and guided them to victory in the 2022 Gold Coast A Grade Competition. Toopi won the 2007 Super League grand final with Leeds Rhinos over Saints 33-6.

== Rugby league career ==
Toopi was born in Stratford, New Zealand, and began his career playing rugby league with the junior ranks of the Mt Wellington and Otahuhu Leopards clubs. He played for Auckland South in the 1999 provincial competition. His first grade career began with the then Auckland Warriors, débuting against the South Sydney Rabbitohs on 2 May 1999. He went on to play 119 games for the club, including the 2002 NRL Grand Final loss to the Sydney Roosters.

In 2000 Toopi was part of the Aotearoa Maori side that played at the World Cup.

Toopi represented New Zealand on twelve occasions between 2001 and 2005. Toopi played for the Kiwis 14 times. He scored three tries in one match against Australia in the 2005 Tri Nations.

On 31 May 2006 Leeds Rhinos announced the capture of Toopi for the 2007 season as a replacement for Chev Walker. On 17 July he was granted an early release from the New Zealand Warriors so he could join the Rhinos for the rest of the season, this was granted the day before the deadline to register players in Super League. He made his début on 4 August 2006 against Hull FC.

== Rugby union career ==
On 23 August 2008 Leeds released Toopi, due to a knee reconstruction that would keep him out of action for 9 months. He attracted interest from the Japanese rugby union club Sanyo Wild Knights, and expressed interest in joining the Manly Sea Eagles in the National Rugby League competition however he did not secure a contract.

Toopi instead returned to New Zealand and switched to rugby union, joining the Whakatane Marist team in the Eastern Bay rugby union competition. On 18 June 2009 it was announced that he had made the Bay of Plenty Rugby Union's squad for the Air New Zealand Cup. He agreed to join the Gold Coast Titans for 2010.

== Return to league ==
During the 2010 pre-season Toopi trialed with the Gold Coast Titans. He did enough to impress management and earn a one-year contract. This was later extended for the 2011 season. He retired at the end of 2011.

Toopi again played for the New Zealand Māori in 2010, captaining the side against England.

== Match Fit ==
In 2023, Toopi participated in season 3 of Match Fit, where former rugby players return to play against the Australian counterparts. He joined in the first season that featured former rugby league stars. On episode 3, he revealed he currently resides in Gold Coast, Australia. Throughout the first third of the 15-week programme, his heart rate kept topping out even though he feels no ill effects, which suggest he has lower than expected aerobic endurance, he thought it was due to jet lag.

In 2024, he returned for Match Fit: Union vs. League. While Pita Alatini and Carlos Spencer went -15 for metabolic age vs. biological age for the best possible result, he, Lesley Vainikolo and Henry Fa'afili started out +15, which is the worst possible result. He admitted he didn't take last season seriously enough until he went -15 for metabolic age for the second initial test in a row. During the IronMaori Triathlon, he was paired in the swim leg with Louis Anderson despite being scared of swimming in open water.
