= List of Northern Eagles players =

This is a list of rugby league footballers who have played first grade for the Northern Eagles. Players are listed in the order they made their debut.

== Players ==
Club
No.	Name	Career	Appearances	Tries	Goals	Field goals	Points
1	Michael Buettner	2000	23	7	2	0	32
2	Owen Cunningham	2000	26	2	13	0	8
3	Greg Ebrill	2000−2001	33	1	0	0	4
4	Andrew Frew	2000	23	11	0	0	44
5	Daniel Gartner	2000	19	1	0	0	4
6	Jamie Goddard	2000−2002	50	9	0	0	36
7	Brett Grogan	2000	10	2	0	0	8
8	Andrew King	2000−2001	47	18	0	0	72
9	Nik Kosef	2000−2002	28	3	0	0	12
10	William Leyshon	2000−2001	11	0	0	0	0
11	Steve Menzies	2000−2002	69	29	0	0	116
12	Adam Muir	2000−2001	45	12	0	0	48
13	Mark O'Meley	2000−2001	34	0	0	0	0
14	Brendon Reeves	2000−2002	66	30	5	0	130
15	Nigel Roy	2000	13	7	0	0	28
16	Jason Taylor	2000	17	1	38	2	82
17	Geoff Toovey	2000−2001	48	0	0	0	0
18	Albert Torrens	2000−2002	60	16	0	0	64
19	Steve Trindall	2000−2001	44	3	0	0	12
20	Joel Wilson	2000	5	0	0	0	0
21	Adam Hayden	2000	6	0	0	0	0
22	Jay Bandy	2000−2001	10	1	0	0	4
23	Josh Stuart	2000−2001	22	0	0	0	0
24	Paul Stringer	2000−2001	36	3	0	0	12
25	Damian Driscoll	2000	5	0	0	0	0
26	Daniel Quinn	2000	3	0	0	0	0
27	Alex Chan	2000	3	0	0	0	0
28	Dragan Durdevic	2000	9	1	0	0	4
29	Matt Orford	2000	11	4	23	0	62
30	Josh Smith	2000	3	1	0	0	4
31	Joel Penny	2000−2001	6	1	0	0	4
32	Scott Asimus	2000−2001	6	0	0	0	0
33	Eparama Navale	2000	1	0	0	0	0
34	Michael Sullivan	2000	1	0	0	0	0
35	Lenny Beckett	2001−2002	32	7	0	0	28
36	Wayne Evans	2001	25	1	0	0	4
37	Brett Kimmorley	2001	26	11	0	0	44
38	Robert Miles	2001−2002	42	10	0	0	40
39	Ben Walker	2001	26	18	103	1	279
40	Scott Pethybridge	2001−2002	5	3	1	0	14
41	Sam Murphy	2001−2002	2	2	0	0	8
42	Ben MacDougall	2001−2002	31	10	0	0	40
43	Phil Bailey	2001	15	1	0	0	4
44	Scott McLean	2001	7	4	0	0	16
45	Steve Carew	2001	2	0	0	0	0
46	Danny Lima	2001−2002	26	1	0	0	4
47	Shayne Dunley	2001−2002	17	2	0	0	8
48	Karl Lovell	2001	2	0	0	0	0
49	John Hopoate	2001−2002	31	12	0	0	48
50	Tony Jensen	2001	4	1	0	0	4
51	Christian Hill	2001	1	0	0	0	0
52	Jason King	2001−2002	22	2	0	0	8
53	Jason Ferris	2002	18	2	7	1	23
54	Wade Forrester	2002	3	0	0	0	12
55	Brad Kelly	2002	10	1	0	0	4
56	Nathan Long	2002	11	1	0	0	4
57	John Malu	2002	2	0	0	0	0
58	Mark Shipway	2002	21	1	0	0	4
59	David Westley	2002	2	0	0	0	0
60	Tasesa Lavea	2002	5	2	5	1	19
61	Grant Wooden	2002	4	0	0	0	0
62	Luke Dorn	2002	19	2	0	0	8
63	Malupo Kaufusi	2002	19	2	0	0	8
64	Chad Randall	2002	13	0	0	0	0
65	Luke Williamson	2002	16	2	45	0	98
66	Gary Winter	2002	5	0	0	0	12
67	Aaron Cannings	2002	7	0	0	0	0
68	Anthony Watmough	2002	8	1	0	0	4
69	Mitch Creary	2002	5	4	0	0	16
