= 2001 NRL season =

Rugby league competition

2001 National Rugby League
- Duration: February 17 – September 30, 2001
- Teams: 14
- Premiers: Newcastle (2nd title)
- Minor premiers: Parramatta (4th title)
- Matches played: 191
- Points scored: 9,333
- Average attendance: 14,043
- Total attendance: 2,682,210
- Top points scorer(s): Andrew Johns (279); Ben Walker (279)
- Wooden spoon: Penrith Panthers (3rd spoon)
- Dally M Medal: Preston Campbell
- Top try-scorer: Nathan Blacklock (27)

The 2001 NRL season was the 94th season of professional rugby league football in Australia and the fourth run by the National Rugby League. Also called the 2001 Telstra Premiership (due to sponsorship from Telstra) it was contested by thirteen Australia-based clubs plus one New Zealand–based club. The Newcastle Knights claimed their second premiership in five seasons, defeating minor premiers Parramatta Eels in the NRL's first ever night-time grand final.

== Season summary ==
Early in the season NRL matches involving the Bulldogs were marred by off-field violence from the club's supporters.

The Parramatta Eels looked set to break their fifteen-year premiership drought as they compiled one of the most dominant season records in rugby league history, losing just four of their 26 regular season games with the League's best attack and defensive record. In 2001 they established the standing record for most points by a club in a season with 943, blitzing the Brisbane Broncos' previous record tally of 871 set in 1998. The Eels tally was significantly contributed to by Jason Taylor, who that year surpassed Daryl Halligan's mark of 2,034 to become the greatest point-scorer in the history of club competition in Australia.

The Warriors made the finals for the first time in their seven-year history under rookie coach Daniel Anderson, but were hammered 56-12 by the aforementioned minor premiers.

After Warren Ryan retired in 2000, the Newcastle Knights appointed former player Michael Hagan to the coaching position. Hagan proceeded to become the first coach since Phil Gould in 1988 to win a premiership in his first season as coach. Ricky Stuart would follow suit with the Roosters the following season. Tim Sheens was sacked as the coach of the North Queensland Cowboys during the season and was replaced by Murray Hurst. Mal Meninga resigned as Canberra coach following the club's disappointing season and in turn was replaced by Matthew Elliott.

Preston Campbell was a deserved winner of the Dally M medal after being an instrumental player in the Sharks' rise to fourth position on the table. Newcastle's Andrew Johns would have been clear winner but was not in contention due to missing two matches through suspension. Brian Smith was recognised as Coach of the Year whilst Braith Anasta won Rookie of the Year.

It was during the 2001 finals series that the new NRL Telstra Premiership logo was used, first seen on the field in the first qualifying final between the Sharks and the Broncos. That logo was to be used until the end of the 2006 season. Coincidentally, the Brisbane Broncos were also involved in the last match to use that logo, albeit in a modified finals version seen on the ground in the 2006 NRL Grand Final.

At the end of the season a squad of players from the NRL premiership went on the 2001 Kangaroo tour.

Every team except Penrith played at least one drawn match during the course of the season. The Bulldogs had three drawn matches, the most of any team during the season.

=== Teams ===
Auckland were renamed the New Zealand Warriors for the 2001 season.

| Brisbane Broncos; 14th season Ground: QSAC; Coach: Wayne Bennett; Captain: Gorden Tallis | Bulldogs; 67th season Ground: Sydney Showground; Coach: Steve Folkes; Captain: Darren Britt | Canberra Raiders; 20th season Ground: Canberra Stadium; Coach: Mal Meninga; Captain: Simon Woolford | Melbourne Storm; 4th season Ground Docklands Stadium; Coach: Chris Anderson → Mark Murray; Captain: Robbie Kearns & Rodney Howe | New Zealand Warriors; 7th season Ground: Ericsson Stadium; Coach: Daniel Anderson; Captain: Stacey Jones & Kevin Campion |
| Newcastle Knights; 14th season Ground: EnergyAustralia Stadium; Coach: Michael Hagan; Captain: Andrew Johns | North Queensland Cowboys; 7th season Ground: Dairy Farmers Stadium; Coach: Tim Sheens → Murray Hurst; Captain: Paul Bowman | Northern Eagles; 2nd season Ground: Brookvale Oval & Grahame Park; Coach: Peter Sharp; Captain: Geoff Toovey | Parramatta Eels; 55th season Ground: Parramatta Stadium; Coach: Brian Smith; Captain: Nathan Cayless | Penrith Panthers; 35th season Ground: CUA Stadium; Coach: Royce Simmons; Captain: Craig Gower |
| Sharks; 37th season Ground: Shark Park; Coach: John Lang; Captain: Jason Stevens | St. George Illawarra Dragons; 3rd season Ground: Kogarah Oval & WIN Stadium; Coach: Andrew Farrar; Captain: Craig Smith | Sydney Roosters; 94th season Ground: Sydney Football Stadium; Coach: Graham Murray; Captain: Brad Fittler | Wests Tigers; 2nd season Ground: Campbelltown Stadium & Leichhardt Oval; Coach: Terry Lamb; Captain: Darren Senter |

=== Advertising ===
With a new CEO in David Moffat from 2000 the NRL late that year moved their account to a new advertising agency in Saatchi & Saatchi Sydney.

There was no umbrella campaign in 2001, no season launch gala ad. NRL Marketing Director, Mark Wallace insisted that the League's marketing budget remained the same as in prior years but that the focus was to be on promoting individual games and complementing the clubs' own marketing activities.

An ad was produced to promote certain key games. The scene is a deserted, eerie CBD street. The sound of a squeaky wheel gets louder until a clown rides into the middle of shot on a tricycle and turns to camera pouting and frowning. The voice over comes up: "This Easter long weekend the Dragons v Roosters at Sydney Football Stadium. You'd be a clown to miss it".

== Regular season ==
| Team | 1 | 2 | 3 | 4 | 5 | 6 | 7 | 8 | 9 | 10 | 11 | 12 | 13 | 14 | 15 | 16 | 17 | 18 | 19 | 20 | 21 | 22 | 23 | 24 | 25 | 26 | F1 | F2 | F3 | GF |
|---|---|---|---|---|---|---|---|---|---|---|---|---|---|---|---|---|---|---|---|---|---|---|---|---|---|---|---|---|---|---|
| Brisbane Broncos | NQL +1 | **PEN** **+16** | PAR −8 | **WTI** **+18** | **NEW** **+34** | NZL −1 | CBY +28 | **MEL** **+2** | SYD −2 | **SGI** **+24** | **CRO** **+19** | CAN; 0 | **NTE** **+16** | **NQL** **+44** | PEN +13 | **PAR** **−16** | WTI +34 | NEW −44 | **NZL** **+36** | **CBY** **−7** | MEL −4 | **SYD** **−14** | SGI −2 | CRO −8 | **CAN** **−22** | NTE +28 | CRO −16 | SGI +16 | PAR −8 | |
| Canberra Raiders | NZL +16 | **CBY** **−10** | CRO −6 | SYD −7 | **SGI** **+10** | **PAR** **+16** | WTI −2 | **NEW** **−2** | **NQL** **+8** | PEN −7 | NTE −8 | **BRI**; **0** | MEL −4 | **NZL** **−12** | CBY +32 | **CRO** **−14** | **SYD** **+10** | SGI −32 | PAR −28 | **WTI** **−6** | NEW −28 | NQL +19 | **PEN** **−2** | **NTE** **−14** | BRI +22 | **MEL** **+26** | | | | |
| Canterbury-Bankstown Bulldogs | MEL +4 | CAN +10 | **NEW**; **0** | **NTE** **+20** | PEN +12 | SYD −26 | **BRI** **−28** | NZL; 0 | WTI +2 | PAR; 0 | NQL +12 | CRO +14 | **SGI** **−12** | **MEL** **+2** | **CAN** **−32** | NEW +28 | NTE +2 | **PEN** **+26** | **SYD** **+16** | BRI +7 | NZL −26 | **WTI** **+14** | **PAR** **−8** | **NQL** **+8** | **CRO** **+2** | SGI +2 | **SGI** **−1** | **CRO** **−42** | | |
| Cronulla-Sutherland Sharks | **SGI** **−24** | PAR +1 | **CAN** **+6** | MEL −10 | **NQL** **+8** | PEN +19 | NTE +6 | **SYD** **−9** | NEW −10 | **NZL** **+10** | BRI −19 | **CBY** **−14** | **WTI**; **0** | SGI; 0 | **PAR** **−30** | CAN +14 | **MEL** **+22** | NQL +30 | **PEN** **+32** | **NTE** **+22** | SYD +8 | **NEW** **+19** | NZL −30 | **BRI** **+8** | CBY −2 | WTI +24 | **BRI** **+16** | CBY +42 | NEW −8 | |
| Melbourne Storm | **CBY** **−4** | **NQL** **−4** | SGI +4 | **CRO** **+10** | WTI −30 | **NEW** **−8** | PAR −24 | BRI −2 | **NTE** **+34** | **SYD** **−1** | PEN +44 | NZL +20 | **CAN** **+4** | CBY −2 | NQL +14 | **SGI** **+6** | CRO −22 | **WTI** **+64** | NEW −32 | **PAR** **−44** | **BRI** **+4** | NTE −8 | SYD −22 | **PEN** **+4** | **NZL**; **0** | CAN −26 | | | | |
| Newcastle Knights | **NTE** **−2** | SYD +7 | CBY; 0 | **PAR** **+18** | BRI −34 | MEL +8 | **NZL** **+21** | CAN +2 | **CRO** **+10** | **WTI** **+50** | SGI +8 | **NQL** **+8** | PEN +7 | NTE −2 | **SYD** **−10** | **CBY** **−28** | PAR −40 | **BRI** **+44** | **MEL** **+32** | NZL +7 | **CAN** **+28** | CRO −19 | WTI −4 | **SGI** **−26** | NQL +16 | **PEN** **+42** | **SYD** **+34** | X | **CRO** **+8** | PAR +6 |
| New Zealand Warriors | **CAN** **−16** | NTE +8 | WTI −19 | **SGI** **+28** | PAR −6 | **BRI** **+1** | NEW −21 | **CBY**; **0** | **PEN** **+44** | CRO −10 | SYD +12 | **MEL** **−20** | NQL −17 | CAN +12 | **NTE** **+4** | **WTI** **−5** | SGI −20 | **PAR** **+11** | BRI −36 | **NEW** **−7** | **CBY** **+26** | PEN +16 | **CRO** **+30** | **SYD** **+6** | MEL; 0 | **NQL** **−12** | PAR −44 | | | |
| North Queensland Cowboys | **BRI** **−1** | MEL +4 | **SYD** **−24** | **PEN** **−14** | CRO −8 | **WTI** **+14** | SGI −36 | **PAR**; **0** | CAN −8 | **NTE** **−2** | **CBY** **−12** | NEW −8 | **NZL** **+17** | BRI −44 | **MEL** **−14** | SYD −26 | PEN +6 | **CRO** **−30** | WTI −2 | **SGI** **+24** | PAR −62 | **CAN** **−19** | NTE; 0 | CBY −8 | **NEW** **−16** | NZL +12 | | | | |
| Northern Eagles | NEW +2 | **NZL** **−8** | PEN +8 | CBY −20 | **SYD** **+1** | SGI −30 | **CRO** **−6** | **WTI** **+16** | MEL −34 | NQL +2 | **CAN** **+8** | **PAR** **−12** | BRI −16 | **NEW** **+2** | NZL −4 | **PEN** **+10** | **CBY** **−2** | SYD +22 | **SGI** **−10** | CRO −22 | WTI −32 | **MEL** **+8** | **NQL**; **0** | CAN +14 | PAR −16 | **BRI** **−28** | | | | |
| Parramatta Eels | PEN +36 | **CRO** **−1** | **BRI** **+8** | NEW −18 | **NZL** **+6** | CAN −16 | **MEL** **+24** | NQL; 0 | SGI +18 | **CBY**; **0** | WTI +54 | NTE +12 | **SYD** **+16** | **PEN** **+26** | CRO +30 | BRI +16 | **NEW** **+40** | NZL −11 | **CAN** **+28** | MEL +44 | **NQL** **+62** | **SGI** **+20** | CBY +8 | **WTI** **+14** | **NTE** **+16** | SYD +1 | **NZL** **+44** | X | **BRI** **+8** | **NEW** **−6** |
| Penrith Panthers | **PAR** **−36** | BRI −16 | **NTE** **−8** | NQL +14 | **CBY** **−12** | **CRO** **−19** | SYD +14 | **SGI** **−28** | NZL −44 | **CAN** **+7** | **MEL** **−44** | WTI +4 | **NEW** **−7** | PAR −26 | **BRI** **−13** | NTE −10 | **NQL** **−6** | CBY −26 | CRO −32 | **SYD** **+10** | SGI −22 | **NZL** **−16** | CAN +2 | MEL −4 | **WTI** **+34** | NEW −42 | | | | |
| St. George Illawarra Dragons | CRO +24 | **WTI** **−2** | **MEL** **−4** | NZL −28 | CAN −10 | **NTE** **+30** | **NQL** **+36** | PEN +28 | **PAR** **−18** | BRI −24 | **NEW** **−8** | **SYD**; **0** | CBY +12 | **CRO**; **0** | WTI +5 | MEL −6 | **NZL** **+20** | **CAN** **+32** | NTE +10 | NQL −24 | **PEN** **+22** | PAR −20 | **BRI** **+2** | NEW +26 | SYD −13 | **CBY** **−2** | CBY +1 | **BRI** **−16** | | |
| Sydney Roosters | WTI +14 | **NEW** **−7** | NQL +24 | **CAN** **+7** | NTE −1 | **CBY** **+26** | **PEN** **−14** | CRO +9 | **BRI** **+2** | MEL +1 | **NZL** **−12** | SGI; 0 | PAR −16 | **WTI** **+13** | NEW +10 | **NQL** **+26** | CAN −10 | **NTE** **−22** | CBY −16 | PEN −10 | **CRO** **−8** | BRI +14 | **MEL** **+22** | NZL −6 | **SGI** **+13** | **PAR** **−1** | NEW −34 | | | |
| Wests Tigers | **SYD** **−14** | SGI +2 | **NZL** **+19** | BRI −18 | **MEL** **+30** | NQL −14 | **CAN** **+2** | NTE −16 | **CBY** **−2** | NEW −50 | **PAR** **−54** | **PEN** **−4** | CRO; 0 | SYD −13 | **SGI** **−5** | NZL +5 | **BRI** **−34** | MEL −64 | **NQL** **+2** | CAN +6 | **NTE** **+32** | CBY −14 | **NEW** **+4** | PAR −14 | PEN −34 | **CRO** **−24** | | | | |
| Team | 1 | 2 | 3 | 4 | 5 | 6 | 7 | 8 | 9 | 10 | 11 | 12 | 13 | 14 | 15 | 16 | 17 | 18 | 19 | 20 | 21 | 22 | 23 | 24 | 25 | 26 | F1 | F2 | F3 | GF |

Bold – Home game
X – Bye
Opponent for round listed above margin

=== Ladder ===
2001 NRL season
| Pos | Team | Pld | W | D | L | PF | PA | PD | Pts |
|---|---|---|---|---|---|---|---|---|---|
| 1 | Parramatta Eels | 26 | 20 | 2 | 4 | 839 | 406 | +433 | 42 |
| 2 | Canterbury-Bankstown Bulldogs | 26 | 17 | 3 | 6 | 617 | 568 | +49 | 37 |
| 3 | Newcastle Knights **(P)** | 26 | 16 | 1 | 9 | 782 | 639 | +143 | 33 |
| 4 | Cronulla-Sutherland Sharks | 26 | 15 | 2 | 9 | 594 | 513 | +81 | 32 |
| 5 | Brisbane Broncos | 26 | 14 | 1 | 11 | 696 | 511 | +185 | 29 |
| 6 | Sydney Roosters | 26 | 13 | 1 | 12 | 647 | 589 | +58 | 27 |
| 7 | St. George Illawarra Dragons | 26 | 12 | 2 | 12 | 661 | 573 | +88 | 26 |
| 8 | New Zealand Warriors | 26 | 12 | 2 | 12 | 638 | 629 | +9 | 26 |
| 9 | Melbourne Storm | 26 | 11 | 1 | 14 | 704 | 725 | -21 | 23 |
| 10 | Northern Eagles | 26 | 11 | 1 | 14 | 603 | 750 | -147 | 23 |
| 11 | Canberra Raiders | 26 | 9 | 1 | 16 | 600 | 623 | -23 | 19 |
| 12 | Wests Tigers | 26 | 9 | 1 | 16 | 474 | 746 | -272 | 19 |
| 13 | North Queensland Cowboys | 26 | 6 | 2 | 18 | 514 | 771 | -257 | 14 |
| 14 | Penrith Panthers | 26 | 7 | 0 | 19 | 521 | 847 | -326 | 14 |

=== Ladder progression ===
- Numbers highlighted in green indicate that the team finished the round inside the top 8.
- Numbers highlighted in blue indicates the team finished first on the ladder in that round.
- Numbers highlighted in red indicates the team finished in last place on the ladder in that round

| | Team | 1 | 2 | 3 | 4 | 5 | 6 | 7 | 8 | 9 | 10 | 11 | 12 | 13 | 14 | 15 | 16 | 17 | 18 | 19 | 20 | 21 | 22 | 23 | 24 | 25 | 26 |
|---|---|---|---|---|---|---|---|---|---|---|---|---|---|---|---|---|---|---|---|---|---|---|---|---|---|---|---|
| 1 | Parramatta | 2 | 2 | 4 | 4 | 6 | 6 | 8 | 9 | 11 | 12 | 14 | 16 | 18 | 20 | 22 | 24 | 26 | 26 | 28 | 30 | 32 | 34 | 36 | 38 | 40 | 42 |
| 2 | Bulldogs | 2 | 4 | 5 | 7 | 9 | 9 | 9 | 10 | 12 | 13 | 15 | 17 | 17 | 19 | 19 | 21 | 23 | 25 | 27 | 29 | 29 | 31 | 31 | 33 | 35 | 37 |
| 3 | **Newcastle** | 0 | 2 | 3 | 5 | 5 | 7 | 9 | 11 | 13 | 15 | 17 | 19 | 21 | 21 | 21 | 21 | 21 | 23 | 25 | 27 | 29 | 29 | 29 | 29 | 31 | 33 |
| 4 | Sharks | 0 | 2 | 4 | 4 | 6 | 8 | 10 | 10 | 10 | 12 | 12 | 12 | 13 | 14 | 14 | 16 | 18 | 20 | 22 | 24 | 26 | 28 | 28 | 30 | 30 | 32 |
| 5 | Brisbane | 2 | 4 | 4 | 6 | 8 | 8 | 10 | 12 | 12 | 14 | 16 | 17 | 19 | 21 | 23 | 23 | 25 | 25 | 27 | 27 | 27 | 27 | 27 | 27 | 27 | 29 |
| 6 | Sydney | 2 | 2 | 4 | 6 | 6 | 8 | 8 | 10 | 12 | 14 | 14 | 15 | 15 | 17 | 19 | 21 | 21 | 21 | 21 | 21 | 21 | 23 | 25 | 25 | 27 | 27 |
| 7 | St George Illawarra | 2 | 2 | 2 | 2 | 2 | 4 | 6 | 8 | 8 | 8 | 8 | 9 | 11 | 12 | 14 | 14 | 16 | 18 | 20 | 20 | 22 | 22 | 24 | 26 | 26 | 26 |
| 8 | New Zealand | 0 | 2 | 2 | 4 | 4 | 6 | 6 | 7 | 9 | 9 | 11 | 11 | 11 | 13 | 15 | 15 | 15 | 17 | 17 | 17 | 19 | 21 | 23 | 25 | 26 | 26 |
| 9 | Melbourne | 0 | 0 | 2 | 4 | 4 | 4 | 4 | 4 | 6 | 6 | 8 | 10 | 12 | 12 | 14 | 16 | 16 | 18 | 18 | 18 | 20 | 20 | 20 | 22 | 23 | 23 |
| 10 | Northern Eagles | 2 | 2 | 4 | 4 | 6 | 6 | 6 | 8 | 8 | 10 | 12 | 12 | 12 | 14 | 14 | 16 | 16 | 18 | 18 | 18 | 18 | 20 | 21 | 23 | 23 | 23 |
| 11 | Canberra | 2 | 2 | 2 | 2 | 4 | 6 | 6 | 6 | 8 | 8 | 8 | 9 | 9 | 9 | 11 | 11 | 13 | 13 | 13 | 13 | 13 | 15 | 15 | 15 | 17 | 19 |
| 12 | Wests | 0 | 2 | 4 | 4 | 6 | 6 | 8 | 8 | 8 | 8 | 8 | 8 | 9 | 9 | 9 | 11 | 11 | 11 | 13 | 15 | 17 | 17 | 19 | 19 | 19 | 19 |
| 13 | North Queensland | 0 | 2 | 2 | 2 | 2 | 4 | 4 | 5 | 5 | 5 | 5 | 5 | 7 | 7 | 7 | 7 | 9 | 9 | 9 | 11 | 11 | 11 | 12 | 12 | 12 | 14 |
| 14 | Penrith | 0 | 0 | 0 | 2 | 2 | 2 | 4 | 4 | 4 | 6 | 6 | 8 | 8 | 8 | 8 | 8 | 8 | 8 | 8 | 10 | 10 | 10 | 12 | 12 | 14 | 14 |

== Finals series ==
To decide the grand finalists from the top eight finishing teams, the NRL adopted the McIntyre final eight system.

| Home | Score | Away | Match Information |
| Home | Score | Away | Date and Time | Venue | Referee | Crowd |
|---|---|---|---|---|---|---|
Qualifying Finals
| Cronulla-Sutherland Sharks | 22 – 6 | Brisbane Broncos | 7 September 2001 | Shark Park | Steve Clark | 15,508 |
| Newcastle Knights | 40 – 6 | Sydney Roosters | 8 September 2001 | Marathon Stadium | Bill Harrigan | 22,061 |
| Canterbury-Bankstown Bulldogs | 22 – 23 | St. George Illawarra Dragons | 8 September 2001 | Sydney Showground | Paul Simpkins | 17,975 |
| Parramatta Eels | 56 – 12 | New Zealand Warriors | 9 September 2001 | Parramatta Stadium | Tim Mander | 17,336 |
Semi-finals
| Brisbane Broncos | 44 – 28 | St. George Illawarra Dragons | 15 September 2001 | Sydney Football Stadium | Paul Simpkins | 19,259 |
| Canterbury-Bankstown Bulldogs | 10 – 52 | Cronulla-Sutherland Sharks | 16 September 2001 | Sydney Football Stadium | Bill Harrigan | 21,507 |
Preliminary Finals
| Newcastle Knights | 18 – 10 | Cronulla-Sutherland Sharks | 22 September 2001 | Sydney Football Stadium | Paul Simpkins | 31,438 |
| Parramatta Eels | 24 – 16 | Brisbane Broncos | 23 September 2001 | Stadium Australia | Bill Harrigan | 34,184 |

=== Chart ===
Qualifying finals
1 | Parramatta | 56
8 | New Zealand | 12
2 | Canterbury | 22
7 | St. George Illawarra | 23
3 | Newcastle | 40
6 | Sydney | 6
4 | Cronulla | 22
5 | Brisbane | 6

Semifinals
4W | St. George Illawarra | 28
2L | Brisbane | 44
3W | Cronulla | 52
1L | Canterbury | 10

Preliminary finals
1W | Parramatta | 24
Brisbane | 16
2W | Newcastle | 18
Cronulla | 10

Final
Parramatta | 24
Newcastle | 30

== Grand Final ==
The 2001 NRL Grand Final was the conclusive and premiership-deciding game of the 2001 NRL season. It was contested at Stadium Australia in Sydney by the Newcastle Knights (who had finished the regular season in third place), and the Parramatta Eels (who had finished the regular season in first place), after the other six teams that had competed in the top-eight finals series had been eliminated. The attendance of 90,414 was the third-highest ever seen at a rugby league match in Australia and it was the first nighttime grand final in the competition's 103-year history. Domestically, live free-to-air television coverage was provided by Nine's Wide World of Sports. The match was also broadcast live in the United States by Fox Sports World. Newcastle Knights won, with their captain Andrew Johns receiving the Clive Churchill Medal for man-of-the-match.

2001 NRL Grand Final

Sunday, 30 September
20:00 AEST (UTC+10)

| Parramatta Eels | 24 – 30 | Newcastle Knights |
|---|---|---|
| Tries: 4 Lyon 66', 73'; Hodgson 58', 79'; Goals: 4 Luke Burt 58', 67', 73', 80' (4/4) | 1st: 0–24; 2nd: 24–6; Report | Tries: 5 Peden 4', 21'; Simpson 7'; Kennedy 32'; Tahu 63'; Goals: 5 Johns 5', pen 13', 23', 32', pen 71' (5/7); Field goals: Johns (0/3) |

Stadium Australia, Sydney
Attendance: 90,414
Referee: Bill Harrigan
Touch judges: Steve Richards, Shayne Hayne
Clive Churchill Medal: Andrew Johns (Newcastle)

== Records and statistics ==
- Parramatta Eels scored the most points in a season by any club in history scoring 839 points in total.
- Wendell Sailor ran 4,452 metres with the ball in 2001, more than any other player in the competition.
- On July 5, the Melbourne Storm beat the Wests Tigers 64-0, which is the Storm's biggest ever win and Tigers biggest loss until the North Queensland Cowboys beat them 74-0 in 2023 . The very next day the Newcastle Knights beat the Brisbane Broncos 44-0, which set at the time, was the Broncos biggest ever loss.
- In round 23, Wests Tigers recorded their biggest comeback when they came from a 24-0 down after 30 minutes of play to win 36-32 against the Newcastle Knights which is the Knights worst collapse. Also equalled the second biggest ever comeback.

The following statistics are as of the conclusion of Round 26.

Top 5 point scorers

| Points | Player | Tries | Goals | Field Goals |
|---|---|---|---|---|
| 279 | Ben Walker | 18 | 103 | 1 |
| 254 | Hazem El Masri | 18 | 91 | 0 |
| 245 | Andrew Johns | 13 | 95 | 3 |
| 245 | Clinton Schifcofske | 10 | 102 | 1 |
| 239 | Jason Taylor | 7 | 105 | 1 |

Top 5 try scorers

| Tries | Player |
|---|---|
| 25 | Nathan Blacklock |
| 20 | Lote Tuqiri |
| 18 | Hazem El Masri |
| 18 | Ben Walker |
| 16 | Nigel Vagana |
| 16 | Timana Tahu |
| 16 | Darren Albert |
| 16 | Craig Wing |

Top 5 goal scorers

| Goals | Player |
|---|---|
| 105 | Jason Taylor |
| 103 | Ben Walker |
| 102 | Clinton Schifcofske |
| 99 | Michael De Vere |
| 95 | Andrew Johns |

== 2001 Transfers ==
=== Players ===
| Player | 2000 Club | 2001 Club |
|---|---|---|
| Jason Bell | Auckland Warriors | Retirement |
| Joe Galuvao | Auckland Warriors | N/A |
| Terry Hermansson | Auckland Warriors | Retirement |
| Odell Manuel | Auckland Warriors | Canberra Raiders |
| Robert Mears | Auckland Warriors | Super League: Leeds Rhinos |
| Lee Oudenryn | Auckland Warriors | North Queensland Cowboys |
| Scott Pethybridge | Auckland Warriors | Northern Eagles |
| John Simon | Auckland Warriors | Wests Tigers |
| Matthew Spence | Auckland Warriors | Retirement |
| Tony Tuimavave | Auckland Warriors | Retirement |
| Joe Vagana | Auckland Warriors | Super League: Bradford Bulls |
| Nigel Vagana | Auckland Warriors | Canterbury-Bankstown Bulldogs |
| Kevin Campion | Brisbane Broncos | New Zealand Warriors |
| Tonie Carroll | Brisbane Broncos | Super League: Leeds Rhinos |
| Michael Hancock | Brisbane Broncos | Super League: Salford City Reds |
| Harvey Howard | Brisbane Broncos | Super League: Wigan Warriors |
| Brad Thorn | Brisbane Broncos | Canterbury (New Zealand rugby union) |
| Ben Walker | Brisbane Broncos | Northern Eagles |
| Kerrod Walters | Brisbane Broncos | Retirement |
| Nathan Barnes | Canberra Raiders | Retirement |
| Anthony Brann | Canberra Raiders | Retirement |
| Mark Corvo | Canberra Raiders | Brisbane Broncos |
| Brandon Costin | Canberra Raiders | Super League: Huddersfield Giants |
| Laurie Daley | Canberra Raiders | Retirement |
| David Furner | Canberra Raiders | Super League: Wigan Warriors |
| Damian Kennedy | Canberra Raiders | N/A |
| Justin Morgan | Canberra Raiders | New Zealand Warriors |
| Brett Mullins | Canberra Raiders | Super League: Leeds Rhinos |
| Bradley Clyde | Canterbury-Bankstown Bulldogs | Super League: Leeds Rhinos |
| Daryl Halligan | Canterbury-Bankstown Bulldogs | Retirement |
| Jason Hetherington | Canterbury-Bankstown Bulldogs | Super League: London Broncos |
| Troy Stone | Canterbury-Bankstown Bulldogs | Super League: Huddersfield Giants |
| Ricky Stuart | Canterbury-Bankstown Bulldogs | Retirement |
| Andrew Ettingshausen | Cronulla-Sutherland Sharks | Retirement |
| Mitch Healey | Cronulla-Sutherland Sharks | Super League: Castleford Tigers |
| Brett Howland | Cronulla-Sutherland Sharks | Canterbury-Bankstown Bulldogs |
| Tim Maddison | Cronulla-Sutherland Sharks | North Queensland Cowboys |
| Wayne Evans | Melbourne Storm | Northern Eagles |
| Brett Kimmorley | Melbourne Storm | Northern Eagles |
| Paul Marquet | Melbourne Storm | Newcastle Knights |
| Tony Martin | Melbourne Storm | Super League: London Broncos |
| Lenny Beckett | Newcastle Knights | Northern Eagles |
| Tony Butterfield | Newcastle Knights | Retirement |
| David Fairleigh | Newcastle Knights | Super League: St. Helens |
| Matthew Johns | Newcastle Knights | Super League: Wigan Warriors |
| Peter Shiels | Newcastle Knights | Super League: St. Helens |
| Jason Temu | Newcastle Knights | New Zealand Warriors |
| Graham Appo | North Queensland Cowboys | Super League: Huddersfield Giants |
| Greg Bourke | North Queensland Cowboys | Burleigh Bears (Queensland Cup) |
| Brett Boyd | North Queensland Cowboys | Retirement |
| Des Clark | North Queensland Cowboys | Retirement |
| Darrien Doherty | North Queensland Cowboys | Retirement |
| Noel Goldthorpe | North Queensland Cowboys | Retirement |
| Paul Green | North Queensland Cowboys | Sydney Roosters |
| Shane Kenward | North Queensland Cowboys | Retirement |
| Martin Locke | North Queensland Cowboys | Retirement |
| Scott Prince | North Queensland Cowboys | Brisbane Broncos |
| Jeremy Schloss | North Queensland Cowboys | Retirement |
| Michael Buettner | Northern Eagles | Parramatta Eels |
| Owen Cunningham | Northern Eagles | Retirement |
| Damian Driscoll | Northern Eagles | Super League: Salford City Reds |
| Andrew Frew | Northern Eagles | Super League: Huddersfield Giants |
| Daniel Gartner | Northern Eagles | Super League: Bradford Bulls |
| Brett Grogan | Northern Eagles | Retirement |
| Nigel Roy | Northern Eagles | Super League: London Broncos |
| Jason Taylor | Northern Eagles | Parramatta Eels |
| Jim Dymock | Parramatta Eels | Super League: London Broncos |
| Stuart Kelly | Parramatta Eels | Brisbane Broncos |
| David Kidwell | Parramatta Eels | Super League: Warrington Wolves |
| Ben Kusto | Parramatta Eels | Super League: Huddersfield Giants |
| Gary Larson | Parramatta Eels | Retirement |
| David Penna | Parramatta Eels | Retirement |
| Clinton Schifcofske | Parramatta Eels | Canberra Raiders |
| Dean Schifilliti | Parramatta Eels | Retirement |
| Dallas Weston | Parramatta Eels | Retirement |
| Brad Drew | Penrith Panthers | Parramatta Eels |
| Nigel Gaffey | Penrith Panthers | Retirement |
| Mark Geyer | Penrith Panthers | Retirement |
| Nathan Brown | St. George Illawarra Dragons | Retirement |
| Anthony Mundine | St. George Illawarra Dragons | Retirement |
| Lee Murphy | St. George Illawarra Dragons | Wests Tigers |
| Luke Patten | St. George Illawarra Dragons | Canterbury-Bankstown Bulldogs |
| Wes Patten | St. George Illawarra Dragons | Retirement |
| Corey Pearson | St. George Illawarra Dragons | Wests Tigers |
| Julian Bailey | Sydney Roosters | Newcastle Knights |
| Richie Barnett | Sydney Roosters | Super League: London Broncos |
| Darren Burns | Sydney Roosters | Brisbane Broncos |
| Jack Elsegood | Sydney Roosters | Retirement |
| Brendan Hurst | Sydney Roosters | Retirement |
| Adrian Lam | Sydney Roosters | Super League: Wigan Warriors |
| Robert Miles | Sydney Roosters | Northern Eagles |
| Shane Rigon | Sydney Roosters | Super League: Bradford Bulls |
| Nathan Wood | Sydney Roosters | New Zealand Warriors |
| Ben Duckworth | Wests Tigers | Parramatta Eels |
| Shayne Dunley | Wests Tigers | Northern Eagles |
| Steve Georgallis | Wests Tigers | Super League: Warrington Wolves |
| Jarrod McCracken | Wests Tigers | Retirement |
| Adam Nable | Wests Tigers | North Queensland Cowboys |
| Karl Lovell | Super League: Huddersfield-Sheffield Giants | Northern Eagles |
| Matt Daylight | Super League: Hull F.C. | Cronulla-Sutherland Sharks |
| Ben Sammut | Super League: Hull F.C. | Cronulla-Sutherland Sharks |
| Richie Blackmore | Super League: Leeds Rhinos | New Zealand Warriors |
| Adrian Morley | Super League: Leeds Rhinos | Sydney Roosters |
| Danny Moore | Super League: London Broncos | North Queensland Cowboys |
| Darrell Trindall | Super League: St. Helens | Canterbury-Bankstown Bulldogs |
| Willie Peters | Super League: Wigan Warriors | St. George Illawarra Dragons |
