= 2001 St. George Illawarra Dragons season =

- NRL rank: 7th
- Play-off result: Semi-finals
- 2001 record: Wins: 12; draws: 2; losses: 12
- Points scored: For: 661; against: 573

Team information
- Coach: Andrew Farrar
- Captain: Craig Smith
- Stadium: Sydney Football Stadium, Wollongong Showground
- Avg. attendance: 11,829
- High attendance: 20,123 (vs. Bulldogs, round 26)

Top scorers
- Tries: Nathan Blacklock (27)
- Points: Nathan Blacklock (122)
← 2000	2002 →

The 2001 St. George Illawarra Dragons season was the third in the joint venture club's history. The Dragons competed in the NRL's 2001 premiership season. The team finished seventh in the regular season, making finals but getting knocked out in the second week against the Brisbane Broncos, losing 44–28.

== Squad gains and losses ==
▲ or ▼	Player	2000 Club	2001 Club
▲	Wade Forrester	Cronulla-Sutherland Sharks	St. George Illawarra Dragons
▲	Paul McGregor	Retirement	St. George Illawarra Dragons
▲	Willie Peters	Wigan Warriors (Super League)	St. George Illawarra Dragons
▼	Luke Branighan	St. George Illawarra Dragons	Cronulla-Sutherland Sharks
▼	Daniel Heckenberg	St. George Illawarra Dragons	Parramatta Eels
▼	Junior Langi	St. George Illawarra Dragons	Melbourne Storm
▼	Lee Murphy	St. George Illawarra Dragons	Wests Tigers
▼	Luke Patten	St. George Illawarra Dragons	Canterbury-Bankstown Bulldogs
▼	Corey Pearson	St. George Illawarra Dragons	Wests Tigers
▼	Nathan Brown	St. George Illawarra Dragons	Retirement
▼	Wes Patten	St. George Illawarra Dragons	Retirement
▼	Anthony Mundine	St. George Illawarra Dragons	Boxing

== Ladder ==
2001 NRL season
Pos	Team	Pld	W	D	L	PF	PA	PD	Pts
1	Parramatta Eels	26	20	2	4	839	406	+433	42
2	Canterbury-Bankstown Bulldogs	26	17	3	6	617	568	+49	37
3	Newcastle Knights (P)	26	16	1	9	782	639	+143	33
4	Cronulla-Sutherland Sharks	26	15	2	9	594	513	+81	32
5	Brisbane Broncos	26	14	1	11	696	511	+185	29
6	Sydney Roosters	26	13	1	12	647	589	+58	27
7	St. George Illawarra Dragons	26	12	2	12	661	573	+88	26
8	New Zealand Warriors	26	12	2	12	638	629	+9	26
9	Melbourne Storm	26	11	1	14	704	725	-21	23
10	Northern Eagles	26	11	1	14	603	750	-147	23
11	Canberra Raiders	26	9	1	16	600	623	-23	19
12	Wests Tigers	26	9	1	16	474	746	-272	19
13	North Queensland Cowboys	26	6	2	18	514	771	-257	14
14	Penrith Panthers	26	7	0	19	521	847	-326	14

=== Ladder progression ===
Round	1	2	3	4	5	6	7	8	9	10	11	12	13	14	15	16	17	18	19	20	21	22	23	24	25	26
Ladder Position	2nd	4th	9th	12th	12th	11th	8th	7th	8th	9th	9th	10th	9th	10th	8th	10th	7th	8th	7th	7th	6th	7th	7th	6th	7th	7th

== Season results ==
Round	Home	Score	Away	Match Information
Round	Home	Score	Away	Date	Venue	Referee	Attendance	Source
1	Cronulla-Sutherland Sharks	6 – 30	St. George Illawarra Dragons	18 February	Endeavour Field	Tony Archer	18,119
2	St. George Illawarra Dragons	24 – 26	Wests Tigers	25 February	Sydney Football Stadium	Bill Harrigan	12,842
3	St. George Illawarra Dragons	16 – 20	Melbourne Storm	3 March	Wollongong Showground	Tony Archer	9,480
4	New Zealand Warriors	34 – 6	St. George Illawarra Dragons	9 March	Mount Smart Stadium	Bill Harrigan	8,738
5	Canberra Raiders	32 – 22	St. George Illawarra Dragons	18 March	Canberra Stadium	Sean Hampstead	10,187
6	St. George Illawarra Dragons	48 – 18	Northern Eagles	23 March	Sydney Football Stadium	Paul Simpkins	10,429
7	St. George Illawarra Dragons	48 – 12	North Queensland Cowboys	1 April	Wollongong Showground	Tim Mander	9,583
8	Penrith Panthers	14 – 42	St. George Illawarra Dragons	8 April	Penrith Stadium	Bill Harrigan	12,744
9	St. George Illawarra Dragons	20 – 16	Parramatta Eels	14 April	Wollongong Showground	Sean Hampstead	13,404
10	Brisbane Broncos	40 – 16	St. George Illawarra Dragons	21 April	Queensland Sport and Athletics Centre	Mark Oaten	19,768
11	St. George Illawarra Dragons	24 – 32	Newcastle Knights	28 April	Sydney Football Stadium	Bill Harrigan	13,567
12	St. George Illawarra Dragons	20 – 20	Sydney Roosters	13 May	Wollongong Showground	Steve Clark	9,792
13	Canterbury-Bankstown Bulldogs	14 – 26	St. George Illawarra Dragons	20 May	Sydney Showground Stadium	Paul Simpkins	15,173
14	St. George Illawarra Dragons	26 – 26	Cronulla-Sutherland Sharks	25 May	Sydney Football Stadium	Paul Simpkins	15,226
15	Wests Tigers	22 – 27	St. George Illawarra Dragons	3 June	Leichhardt Oval	Sean Hampstead	13,152
16	Melbourne Storm	34 – 28	St. George Illawarra Dragons	17 June	Docklands Stadium	Tony Archer	11,530
17	St. George Illawarra Dragons	38 – 18	New Zealand Warriors	24 June	Wollongong Showground	Tim Mander	9,013
18	St. George Illawarra Dragons	44 – 12	Canberra Raiders	7 July	Wollongong Showground	Bill Harrigan	10,108
19	Northern Eagles	18 – 28	St. George Illawarra Dragons	14 July	Brookvale Oval	Paul Simpkins	7,017
20	North Queensland Cowboys	34 – 10	St. George Illawarra Dragons	21 July	Willows Sports Complex	Shayne Hayne	14,293
21	St. George Illawarra Dragons	28 – 6	Penrith Panthers	28 July	Sydney Football Stadium	Shayne Hayne	7,147
22	Parramatta Eels	32 – 12	St. George Illawarra Dragons	3 August	Parramatta Stadium	Paul Simpkins	23,061
23	St. George Illawarra Dragons	20 – 18	Brisbane Broncos	12 August	Wollongong Showground	Tim Mander	13,058
24	Newcastle Knights	12 – 38	St. George Illawarra Dragons	17 August	Newcastle International Sports Centre	Bill Harrigan	20,234
25	Sydney Roosters	12 – 25	St. George Illawarra Dragons	26 August	Sydney Football Stadium	Bill Harrigan	20,117
26	St. George Illawarra Dragons	22 – 24	Canterbury-Bankstown Bulldogs	31 August	Sydney Football Stadium	Paul Simpkins	20,123
FW1	Canterbury-Bankstown Bulldogs	22 – 23	St. George Illawarra Dragons	8 September	Sydney Showground Stadium	Paul Simpkins	17,975
FW2	Brisbane Broncos	44 – 28	St. George Illawarra Dragons	15 September	Sydney Football Stadium	Paul Simpkins	19,259
