= 2001 Cronulla-Sutherland Sharks season =

- NRL rank: 4th
- 2001 record: Wins: 17; draws: 2; losses: 10
- Points scored: For: 678 (119 tries, 99 goals, 4 field goals); against: 547 (95 tries, 83 goals, 1 field goal)

Team information
- Coach: John Lang
- Captain: David Peachey Jason Stevens
- Stadium: Toyota Park
- Avg. attendance: 12,409

Top scorers
- Tries: Preston Campbell (17)
- Goals: Jason Ferris (46)
- Points: Jason Ferris (121)
← 2000	2002 →

The 2001 Cronulla-Sutherland Sharks season was the 35th in the club's history. They competed in the NRL's 2001 Telstra Premiership.

== Season summary ==
The Sharks 2001 season saw them finish in the top four for the third time in five seasons (including the only Super League season). It was in their first qualifying finals match against the defending premiers Brisbane (the third year in succession the Sharks had met the Broncos at this stage) that the new Telstra Premiership logo, to be used until the end of 2006, was first seen on the field. The Sharks won this match, followed by a 54–10 win over second-placed Canterbury, which set them up for a second attempt at a Grand Final berth in three years. Despite leading at half-time, the Sharks were run down in the second half by the Andrew Johns-led Newcastle Knights, who ultimately went on to win the premiership. Yet another Sharks season of promise ended in disappointment.

The highlight of the season was Preston Campbell, who later went on to play in Penrith's 2003 premiership, winning the coveted Dally M Medal.

== Squad Movement ==
=== 2001 Gains ===
Player	Signed from
Luke Branighan	St George Illawarra Dragons
Matthew Daylight	Hull FC
Ben Sammut	Hull FC

=== 2001 Losses ===
Player	Signed from
Paul Donaghy	Retired
Andrew Ettinghausen	Retired
Wade Forrester	St George Illawarra Dragons
Mitch Healey	Castleford Tigers
Brett Howland	Canterbury Bulldogs
Keiran Kerr	St George Illawarra Dragons
Tim Maddison	North Queensland Cowboys

== Ladder ==
2001 NRL season
Pos	Team	Pld	W	D	L	PF	PA	PD	Pts
1	Parramatta Eels	26	20	2	4	839	406	+433	42
2	Canterbury-Bankstown Bulldogs	26	17	3	6	617	568	+49	37
3	Newcastle Knights (P)	26	16	1	9	782	639	+143	33
4	Cronulla-Sutherland Sharks	26	15	2	9	594	513	+81	32
5	Brisbane Broncos	26	14	1	11	696	511	+185	29
6	Sydney Roosters	26	13	1	12	647	589	+58	27
7	St. George Illawarra Dragons	26	12	2	12	661	573	+88	26
8	New Zealand Warriors	26	12	2	12	638	629	+9	26
9	Melbourne Storm	26	11	1	14	704	725	-21	23
10	Northern Eagles	26	11	1	14	603	750	-147	23
11	Canberra Raiders	26	9	1	16	600	623	-23	19
12	Wests Tigers	26	9	1	16	474	746	-272	19
13	North Queensland Cowboys	26	6	2	18	514	771	-257	14
14	Penrith Panthers	26	7	0	19	521	847	-326	14
