= 2001 Parramatta Eels season =

- NRL Rank: 1st
- Play-off result: Runners-up (Lost 24–30 vs Newcastle Knights, Grand Final)
- World Club Challenge: DNQ
- 2001 record: Wins: 20; draws: 2; losses: 4
- Points scored: For: 839; against: 406

Team information
- CEO: Denis Fitzgerald
- Coach: (Australia) Brian Smith
- Captain: (New Zealand) Nathan Cayless
- Stadium: Parramatta Stadium (Capacity: 20,741)
- High attendance: 34,184 (23 September vs Brisbane Broncos, 2nd Preliminary Final)

Top scorers
- Tries: (Australia) Brett Hodgson (21)
- Goals: (Australia) Jason Taylor (116)
- Points: (Australia) Jason Taylor (265)
← 2000	List of seasons	2002 →

The 2001 Parramatta Eels season was the 55th in the club's history. Coached by Brian Smith and captained by Nathan Cayless, they competed in the National Rugby League's 2001 Telstra Premiership, reaching the 2001 NRL Grand final.

== Summary ==
In 2001, Parramatta set a regular-season points scoring record in the premiership by scoring 839 points in 26 matches on their way to claiming the minor premiership. In their fifth consecutive Finals Series, Parramatta dominated the series, starting with a 56–12 victory over the New Zealand Warriors at Parramatta Stadium in front of 17,336. After getting a week off, Parramatta defeated the Brisbane Broncos at Stadium Australia, 24–16 in the rematch of the 2000 preliminary final.

Parramatta went into the decider as hot favourites after losing just once in 22 matches. Despite this the team was defeated in their first grand final appearance in fifteen years. They lost 30–24 against the Newcastle Knights, trailing 24–0 at half-time.

Parramatta set a number of point scoring records throughout the season which as of 2023 are yet to be broken which include, most points in a regular season (839). They also set the record for most tries (159) and most points (943) in a full premiership season. The 2001 Parramatta side also held the records for most tries in a regular season and highest points differential of any side in a regular season, however both of these records were broken by Melbourne in the 2021 NRL season.

== Standings ==
2001 NRL season
Pos	Team	Pld	W	D	L	PF	PA	PD	Pts
1	Parramatta Eels	26	20	2	4	839	406	+433	42
2	Canterbury-Bankstown Bulldogs	26	17	3	6	617	568	+49	37
3	Newcastle Knights (P)	26	16	1	9	782	639	+143	33
4	Cronulla-Sutherland Sharks	26	15	2	9	594	513	+81	32
5	Brisbane Broncos	26	14	1	11	696	511	+185	29
6	Sydney Roosters	26	13	1	12	647	589	+58	27
7	St. George Illawarra Dragons	26	12	2	12	661	573	+88	26
8	New Zealand Warriors	26	12	2	12	638	629	+9	26
9	Melbourne Storm	26	11	1	14	704	725	-21	23
10	Northern Eagles	26	11	1	14	603	750	-147	23
11	Canberra Raiders	26	9	1	16	600	623	-23	19
12	Wests Tigers	26	9	1	16	474	746	-272	19
13	North Queensland Cowboys	26	6	2	18	514	771	-257	14
14	Penrith Panthers	26	7	0	19	521	847	-326	14

== Awards ==
- Michael Cronin clubman of the year award: Brett Hodgson
- Ken Thornett Medal (Players' player): Nathan Hindmarsh
- Jack Gibson Award (Coach's award): Jamie Lyon
- Eric Grothe Rookie of the Year Award: Danny Sullivan
