= 2001 Brisbane Broncos season =

Fourteenth Brisbane Broncos season

Coordinates: 27.558333°S 153.062222°E

← 2000	2002 →

The 2001 Brisbane Broncos season was the fourteenth in the club's history. They competed in the NRL's 2001 Telstra Premiership and finished the regular season in fifth position, going on to play in the finals and coming within one match of the grand final.

== Season summary ==
As the 2000 season's premiers, the Brisbane Broncos travelled to England in January to contest the 2001 World Club Challenge. The players wore black armbands during the match in memory of the club's co-founder Paul "Porky" Morgan who had died from a heart attack the previous day. Brent Tate made his NRL debut for the Broncos this season.

In round 19, the club took a home match to the Gold Coast, playing the New Zealand Warriors at Carrara Stadium due to their regular stadium being unavailable due to hosting the 2001 World Masters Athletics Championships.

The 2001 NRL season was unusual for the Broncos in that they were unable to string together more than three wins at any time during the season. They lost six games from rounds 20 to 25, at the time the club's worst-ever losing streak. However they finished in 5th position and made it as far as the preliminary final which they lost to Parramatta, in what was a rematch of the preliminary final from the previous season in which the Broncos won 16–10.

== Match results ==
Round	Opponent	Result	Bro.	Opp.	Date	Venue	Crowd	Position
WCC	St Helens R.F.C.	Loss	18	20	26 Jan	Reebok Stadium	16,041	
1	North Queensland Cowboys	Win	18	17	17 Feb	Dairy Farmers Stadium	21,759	7/14
2	Penrith Panthers	Win	38	22	24 Feb	ANZ Stadium	17,345	1/14
3	Parramatta Eels	Loss	18	26	2 Mar	Parramatta Stadium	18,119	4/14
4	Wests Tigers	Win	24	6	10 Mar	ANZ Stadium	12,484	3/14
5	Newcastle Knights	Win	42	8	16 Mar	ANZ Stadium	22,540	2/14
6	New Zealand Warriors	Loss	12	13	24 Mar	Ericsson Stadium	13,921	3/14
7	Canterbury Bulldogs	Win	34	6	30 Mar	Sydney Showground	16,642	1/14
8	Melbourne Storm	Win	18	16	8 Apr	ANZ Stadium	17,809	1/14
9	Sydney Roosters	Loss	18	20	13 Apr	Sydney Football Stadium	21,126	2/14
10	St George Illawarra Dragons	Win	40	16	21 Apr	ANZ Stadium	19,768	2/14
11	Cronulla Sharks	Win	35	16	27 Apr	ANZ Stadium	20,571	2/14
12*	Canberra Raiders	Draw	26	26	13 May	Bruce Stadium	14,414	2/14
13	Northern Eagles	Win	22	6	20 May	ANZ Stadium	16,306	2/14
14	North Queensland Cowboys	Win	50	6	27 May	ANZ Stadium	14,174	1/14
15	Penrith Panthers	Win	29	16	2 Jun	Penrith Football Stadium	11,757	1/14
16*	Parramatta Eels	Loss	12	28	15 Jun	ANZ Stadium	28,531	2/14
17	Wests Tigers	Win	44	10	23 Jun	Campbelltown Stadium	8,362	2/14
18*	Newcastle Knights	Loss	0	44	6 Jul	Marathon Stadium	22,834	2/14
19	New Zealand Warriors	Win	48	12	15 Jul	Carrara Stadium	15,813	2/14
20	Canterbury Bulldogs	Loss	30	37	22 Jul	ANZ Stadium	25,830	3/14
21	Melbourne Storm	Loss	28	32	29 Jul	Telstra Dome	15,470	4/14
22	Sydney Roosters	Loss	16	30	5 Aug	ANZ Stadium	24,107	5/14
23	St George Illawarra Dragons	Loss	18	20	12 Aug	WIN Stadium	13,058	5/14
24	Cronulla Sharks	Loss	16	24	19 Aug	Shark Park	17,894	5/14
25	Canberra Raiders	Loss	18	40	26 Aug	ANZ Stadium	20,956	5/14
26	Northern Eagles	Win	42	14	1 Sep	Bluetongue Central Coast Stadium	10,265	5/14
Qualif. Final	Cronulla Sharks	Loss	6	22	7 Sep	Shark Park	15,508	
Semi Final	St George Illawarra Dragons	Win	44	28	15 Sep	Sydney Football Stadium	19,259	
Prelim. Final	Parramatta Eels	Loss	16	24	23 Sep	Stadium Australia	34,184	

*Game following a State of Origin match

== Ladder ==
2001 NRL season
Pos	Team	Pld	W	D	L	PF	PA	PD	Pts
1	Parramatta Eels	26	20	2	4	839	406	+433	42
2	Canterbury-Bankstown Bulldogs	26	17	3	6	617	568	+49	37
3	Newcastle Knights (P)	26	16	1	9	782	639	+143	33
4	Cronulla-Sutherland Sharks	26	15	2	9	594	513	+81	32
5	Brisbane Broncos	26	14	1	11	696	511	+185	29
6	Sydney Roosters	26	13	1	12	647	589	+58	27
7	St. George Illawarra Dragons	26	12	2	12	661	573	+88	26
8	New Zealand Warriors	26	12	2	12	638	629	+9	26
9	Melbourne Storm	26	11	1	14	704	725	-21	23
10	Northern Eagles	26	11	1	14	603	750	-147	23
11	Canberra Raiders	26	9	1	16	600	623	-23	19
12	Wests Tigers	26	9	1	16	474	746	-272	19
13	North Queensland Cowboys	26	6	2	18	514	771	-257	14
14	Penrith Panthers	26	7	0	19	521	847	-326	14

== Scorers ==
Player	Tries	Goals	FG	Points
Michael De Vere	2	99/122	0	206
Lote Tuqiri	21	0/1	0	84
Wendell Sailor	18	1/1	0	74
Chris Walker	17	0	0	68
Darren Lockyer	7	16/23	2	62
Carl Webb	9	0	0	36
Shaun Berrigan	8	0	0	32
Ashley Harrison	8	0	0	32
Dane Carlaw	7	0	0	28
Petero Civoniceva	6	0	0	24
Scott Prince	4	2/2	0	20
Justin Hodges	4	0	0	16
Stuart Kelly	4	0	0	16
Ben Ikin	3	0	0	12
Luke Priddis	3	0	0	12
Gorden Tallis	3	0	0	12
Shane Webcke	3	0	0	12
Corey Parker	2	0	0	8
Brad Meyers	1	0	0	4
Kevin Walters	1	0	0	4

== Honours ==
=== League ===
- Nil

=== Club ===
- Player of the year: Shane Webcke
- Rookie of the year: Carl Webb
- Back of the year: Darren Lockyer
- Forward of the year: Shane Webcke
- Club man of the year: Ben Ikin
