= 2001 Bulldogs RLFC season =

Canterbury-Bankstown Bulldogs
- 2001 season
- Head coach: Steve Folkes
- Captain: Darren Britt 22 games and Craig Polla-Mounter six games
- Top try scorer: Club: Hazem El Masri (19)
- Top points scorer: Club: Hazem El Masri (270)
- Highest home attendance: 21,895 v Parramatta Eels, round 23
- Average home attendance: 13,319

The 2001 Bulldogs RLFC season was the 67th in the club's history. Coached by Steve Folkes and captained by Darren Britt, they competed in the National Rugby League's 2001 Telstra Premiership, finishing the regular season 2nd. The team went on to the Semi-finals after losing the semi-final game 10-52 against the Cronulla Sharks at the Sydney Football Stadium.

== Squad movement ==
=== Gains ===
Player	Signed from	Until end of	Notes
Brett Howland	Cronulla-Sutherland Sharks	2003	
Luke Patten	St George Illawarra Dragons	Until retirement (2010)	
Paul Rauhihi	Newcastle Knights	2002	
Darrell Trindall	South Sydney Rabbitohs	2002	
Nigel Vagana	New Zealand Warriors	2003	

=== Debuts ===
- Royce Simms

=== Losses ===
Player	Signed to	Until end of	Notes
Bradley Clyde	Leeds Rhinos	?	
Jason Hetherington	London Broncos	2002	
Justin Murphy	New Zealand Warriors	2004	
Troy Stone	Huddersfield Giants	2001	

=== Left club/did not play in 2001 ===
- Daryl Halligan
- Gavin Lester
- James Pickering
- Nathan Sologinkin
- Ricky Stuart

== Fixtures ==
=== Regular season ===
Date	Round	Opponent	Venue	Score	Tries	Goals	Attendance	Ladder Position
Sunday 18 February	1	Melbourne Storm	Colonial Stadium	14-10	Darren Smith, Willie Mason	Hazem El Masri (3)	15,070	5th
Sunday 25 February	2	Canberra Raiders	Bruce Stadium	28-18	Brett Howland, Darren Britt, Shane Marteene, Brent Sherwin, Braith Anasta	Hazem El Masri (4)	11,685	2nd
Sunday 4 March	3	Newcastle Knights	Sydney Showground	28-28	Hazem El Masri, Darren Smith, Luke Patten, Paul Rauhihi, Braith Anasta	Hazem El Masri (4)	18,109	1st
Saturday 10 March	4	Northern Eagles	Sydney Showground	38-18	Hazem El Masri (3), Nigel Vagana (2), Darren Smith, Craig Polla-Mounter, Braith Anasta	Hazem El Masri (3)	14,302	1st
Saturday 17 March	5	Penrith Panthers	Penrith Football Stadium	32-20	Corey Hughes, Darren Smith, Travis Norton, Brett Howland, Willie Mason	Hazem El Masri (6)	16,010	1st
Sunday 25 March	6	Sydney Roosters	Sydney Football Stadium	12-38	Brett Howland, Nigel Vagana	Hazem El Masri (2)	15,251	1st
Friday 30 March	7	Brisbane Broncos	Sydney Showground	6-34	Braith Anasta	Hazem El Masri	16,642	4th
Saturday 7 April	8	New Zealand Warriors	Westpac Stadium, Wellington	24-24	Luke Patten (2), Hazem El Masri, Steve Reardon, Glen Hughes	Hazem El Masri (2)	27,700	5th
Saturday 14 April	9	West Tigers	Campbelltown Stadium	16-14	Hazem El Masri (2), Travis Norton	Hazem El Masri (2)	14,632	4th
Friday 20 April	10	Parramatta Eels	Parramatta Stadium	20-20	Jamie Feeney (2), Nigel Vagana	Hazem El Masri (4)	20,220	4th
Saturday 28 April	11	North Queensland Cowboys	Dairy Farmers Stadium	26-14	Darrell Trindall (2), Nigel Vagana, Braith Anasta	Hazem El Masri (5)	8,000	3rd
Friday 11 May	12	Cronulla-Sutherland Sharks	Toyota Park	20-6	Hazem El Masri, Luke Patten, Nigel Vagana, Shane Marteene	Hazem El Masri (2)	11,218	3rd
Friday 20 April	13	St George Illawarra Dragons	Sydney Showground	14-26	Willie Talau, Luke Patten	Hazem El Masri (3)	15,173	4th
Sunday 27 May	14	Melbourne Storm	Sydney Showground	28-26	Nigel Vagana (3), Hazem El Masri (2)	Hazem El Masri (4)	8,234	4th
Saturday 2 June	15	Canberra Raiders	Sydney Showground	0-32			8,155	5th
Sunday 17 June	16	Newcastle Knights	Marathon Stadium	46-18	Hazem El Masri (3), Jamie Feeney (2), Braith Anasta (2), Willie Talau	Hazem El Masri (7)	16,645	5th
Sunday 24 June	17	Northern Eagles	NorthPower Stadium	32-30	Craig Polla-Mounter (2), Hazem El Masri, Darren Smith, Brent Sherwin	Hazem El Masri (6)	13,222	3rd
Sunday 8 July	18	Penrith Panthers	Sydney Showground	40-14	Braith Anasta (2), Hazem El Masri, Dennis Scott, Luke Patten, Nigel Vagana, Darrell Trindall	Hazem El Masri (6)	8,217	3rd
Sunday 15 July	19	Sydney Roosters	Sydney Showground	34-18	Hazem El Masri, Willie Talau, Shane Marteene, Willie Mason, Braith Anasta, Darrell Trindall	Hazem El Masri (5)	13,303	3rd
Sunday 22 July	20	Brisbane Broncos	ANZ Stadium	37-30	Willie Talau, Steven Price, Darren Smith, Steve Reardon, Nigel Vagana, Braith Anasta	Hazem El Masri (6), Braith Anasta (FG)	25,830	2nd
Sunday 28 July	21	New Zealand Warriors	Ericsson Stadium	8-34	Nigel Vagana, Shane Marteene		10,391	3rd
Saturday 4 August	22	West Tigers	Sydney Showground	28-14	Luke Patten (2), Steven Price, Glenn Hughes, Shane Marteene	Hazem El Masri (4)	15,153	2nd
Friday 10 August	23	Parramatta Eels	Sydney Showground	16-24	Nigel Vagana, Shane Marteene, Braith Anasta	Hazem El Masri (2)	21,895	2nd
Saturday 18 August	24	North Queensland Cowboys	Sydney Showground	30-22	Hazem El Masri (2), Willie Talau, Steve Reardon, Jamie Feeney, Glen Hughes	Hazem El Masri (2), Braith Anasta (1)	6,715	2nd
Friday 24 August	25	Cronulla-Sutherland Sharks	Sydney Showground	16-14	Willie Talau, Craig Polla-Mounter	Hazem El Masri (4)	14,871	2nd
Friday 31 August	26	St George Illawarra Dragons	Sydney Football Stadium	24-22	Nigel Vagana (3), Rod Silva	Hazem El Masri (4)	20,123	2nd

==== Finals season ====
Date	Round	Opponent	Venue	Score	Tries	Goals	Attendance	Ladder Position
Saturday 8 September	Qualif Final	St George Illawarra Dragons	Sydney Showground	22-23	Hazem El Masri, Glen Hughes, Braith Anasta	Hazem El Masri (5)	17,975	-
Sunday 16 September	Semi-final	Cronulla-Sutherland Sharks	Sydney Football Stadium	10-52	Willie Talau, Steven Price	Hazem El Masri (1)	19,259	-

== Player statistics ==
Player	Age	App	Int	T	G	FG	Pts
Braith Anasta	19	21	3	13	1	1	55
Darren Britt	31	22	1	1	-	-	4
Hazem El Masri	25	28	-	19	97	-	270
Jamie Feeney	23	13	15	6	-	-	24
Brett Howland	25	12	-	3	-	-	12
Corey Hughes	23	14	3	1	-	-	4
Glen Hughes	28	8	6	4	-	-	16
Steven Hughes	27	3	-	-	-	-	-
Shane Marteene	24	18	-	5	-	-	20
Willie Mason	21	11	12	3	-	-	-
Travis Norton	25	8	-	2	-	-	8
Luke Patten	21	28	-	8	-	-	32
Adam Peek	23	-	10	-	-	-	-
Adam Perry	22	4	1	-	-	-	-
Shane Perry	24	-	1	-	-	-	-
Craig Polla-Mounter	29	23	-	4	-	-	16
Steven Price	27	25	1	3	-	-	12
Paul Rauhihi	28	6	11	1	-	-	4
Steve Reardon	30	17	4	3	-	-	8
Dennis Scott	25	4	13	1	-	-	4
Brent Sherwin	23	9	12	2	-	-	8
Rod Silva	33	1	-	1	-	-	4
Royce Simms	23	-	2	-	-	-	-
Darren Smith	32	23	-	6	-	-	24
Troy Stone	29	-	1	-	-	-	-
Willie Talau	25	24	2	7	-	-	28
David Thomson	23	-	1	-	-	-	-
Darrell Trindall	29	15	2	4	-	-	16
Nigel Vagana	26	26	-	16	-	-	64
Barry Ward	30	1	11	-	-	-	-

Source=

=== Notes ===
- Age = Age at the end of 2001
- App = Starting appearances
- Int = Interchange appearances
- T = Tries
- G = Goals
- FG = Field Goals
- Pts = Points

== Representatives ==
Player	Papua New Guinea vs Australia	Ashes Series	City vs Country	State of Origin	New Zealand v France	New Zealand vs Australia
Braith Anasta	Australia	Australia	-	-	-	-
Darren Britt	-	-	Country	-	-	-
Hazem El Masri	-	-	City	-	-	-
Darren Smith	-	-	-	Queensland (3)	-	-
Willie Talau	-	-	-	-	New Zealand	-
Nigel Vagana	-	-	-	-	-	New Zealand
Barry Ward	-	-	City	-	-	-

== See also ==
- List of Canterbury-Bankstown Bulldogs seasons
