= St. George Illawarra Dragons head to head record =

The St. George Illawarra Dragons are a rugby league club jointly based in Kogarah and Wollongong, New South Wales who compete in the National Rugby League. The club was formed on 23 September 1998 by a merger of the St. George Dragons and the Illawarra Steelers and they played their first competitive match in 1999 against the Parramatta Eels, losing 20–10. The club shares home games between Jubilee Oval and Wollongong Showground.

The club has played 535 matches in the NRL, winning 271, drawing 6 and losing 258, leading to a win rate of 51.21%. In the process, they have scored 11,350 points and conceded 10,509. Their best win percentages come against the Balmain Tigers, North Sydney Bears and Western Suburbs Magpies, against whom they've never lost a game. Their worst win percentage comes against the Melbourne Storm, as the Dragons have won just 28.37% (or 10 out of 37) of their matches against the Victorian side.

== Key ==
- The records include matches played in the National Rugby League, both in the regular season and the finals. Trials and nines matches do not count.
- † Teams with this background and symbol in the club column are competing in the 2020 NRL season alongside the Dragons
- P = Games played, W = Games won, D = Games drawn, L = Games lost, F = Points scored (for), A = Points conceded (against), PD = Point differential (F-A), Win% = Win percentage

== Head to head record ==
Updated as of 2 May 2020

Team	P	W	D	L	P	W	D	L	P	W	D	L	P	W	D	L	F	A	PD	Win%
Team	Home (Regular season)				Away (Regular season)				Finals				Total							Win%
Balmain Tigers	1	1	0	0	1	1	0	0	0	0	0	0	2	2	0	0	86	24	+62	100.00
Brisbane Broncos †	16	9	0	7	19	6	0	13	5	2	0	3	40	17	0	23	759	861	-102	42.50
Canberra Raiders †	14	7	1	6	16	4	0	12	0	0	0	0	30	11	1	18	640	650	-10	38.33
Canterbury-Bankstown Bulldogs †	21	7	0	14	17	7	0	10	2	1	0	1	40	15	0	25	733	847	-114	37.50
Cronulla-Sutherland Sharks †	23	13	1	9	21	8	0	13	3	2	0	1	47	23	1	23	939	832	+107	48.93
Gold Coast Titans †	11	7	0	4	13	9	0	4	0	0	0	0	24	16	0	8	544	390	+154	66.66
Manly Warringah Sea Eagles †	17	14	0	3	11	5	0	6	3	2	0	1	31	21	0	10	746	554	+192	67.74
Melbourne Storm †	18	9	1	8	17	1	0	16	3	1	0	2	38	11	1	26	706	870	-164	28.94
New Zealand Warriors †	14	12	0	2	16	9	0	7	0	0	0	0	30	21	0	9	718	489	+229	70.00
Newcastle Knights †	18	10	0	8	21	16	0	5	1	1	0	0	40	27	0	13	919	830	+89	67.50
North Queensland Cowboys †	20	13	0	7	14	4	0	10	0	0	0	0	34	17	0	17	736	719	+17	50.00
Northern Eagles	3	1	0	2	3	1	0	2	0	0	0	0	6	2	0	4	144	121	+23	33.33
North Sydney Bears	1	1	0	0	1	1	0	0	0	0	0	0	2	2	0	0	52	24	+28	100.00
Parramatta Eels †	16	11	1	4	21	5	1	15	1	0	0	1	38	16	2	20	686	749	-63	42.10
Penrith Panthers †	18	13	0	5	16	7	0	9	1	0	0	1	35	20	0	15	775	644	+131	57.14
South Sydney Rabbitohs †	16	8	0	8	17	9	0	8	1	0	0	1	34	17	0	17	804	688	+116	50.00
Sydney Roosters †	19	10	1	8	22	8	0	14	2	2	0	0	43	20	1	22	808	850	-42	50.00
Western Suburbs Magpies	1	1	0	0	0	0	0	0	0	0	0	0	1	1	0	0	44	4	+40	100.00
Wests Tigers †	18	9	0	9	17	10	0	7	3	1	0	2	38	20	0	18	876	738	+138	52.63
Total	256	151	5	100	254	108	1	145	25	12	0	13	535	271	6	258	11350	10509	+841	51.21
