= Ebrill =

Ebrill is a surname. Notable people with the surname include:

- Greg Ebrill (born 1979), Australian rugby league footballer
- Thomas Ebrill (also spelt Abrill, fl. 1820–1842), British merchant
