= Gary Winter =

Australian former rugby league footballer

Personal information
- Full name: Gary Winter
- Born: 28 April 1977 (age 48); Sydney, New South Wales, Australia
- Height: 188 cm (6 ft 2 in)
- Weight: 108 kg (17 st 0 lb)

Playing information
- Position: Second-row
Club
Years	Team	Pld	T	G	FG	P
2002	Northern Eagles	5	0	0	0	0
2003	Manly Sea Eagles	4	0	0	0	0
	Total	9	0	0	0	0

Gary Winter (born 28 April 1977) is a former professional rugby league footballer who played in the 2000s. He played as a second-row forward for the Northern Eagles and Manly-Warringah Sea Eagles in the NRL.

== Playing career ==
Winter was a Narrabeen junior. In round 7 of the 2002 NRL season, on his 25th birthday, Winter made his NRL debut for the Northern Eagles in their 34–16 loss to the Wests Tigers at Leichhardt Oval. He spent the majority of the season playing for the Eagles' NSW Cup side.

At the end of the 2002 season, the Northern Eagles were dissolved with the Manly club announcing that they had applied to the NRL to once again be a stand-alone club returning to the top grade for the first time since 1999. Winter played with the Sea Eagles until he was released from the club at the end of the 2003 season.

== Statistics ==
=== NRL ===
Statistics are correct to the end of the 2003 season

Season	Team	Matches	T	G	GK %	F/G	Pts
2002	Northern Eagles	5	0	0	0	0	0
2003	Manly	4	0	0	0	0	0
Career totals		9	0	0	0	0	0
