= Malupo Kaufusi =

Tonga international rugby league footballer

Personal information
- Full name: Malupo Kaufusi
- Born: 31 May 1979 (age 47) Tonga

Playing information
- Position: Prop
Club
Years	Team	Pld	T	G	FG	P
2002	Northern Eagles	19	2	0	0	8
2004	Parramatta Eels	1	0	0	0	0
2004	London Broncos	4	0	0	0	1
	Total	24	2	0	0	9
Representative
Years	Team	Pld	T	G	FG	P
2000	Tonga	1	0	0	0	0
- Source: As of 25 June 2019

Malupo Kaufusi (born 31 May 1979) is a Tongan former professional rugby league footballer who played in the 2000s for the Northern Eagles, the Parramatta Eels and the London Broncos, as a wing.

== Playing career ==
Kaufusi made his first grade debut for the Northern Eagles in Round 6 2002 against Canberra at Grahame Park. Kaufusi played in the Northern Eagles final ever game which was a 68-28 loss against Penrith in Round 26 2002 at Brookvale Oval.

At the end of 2002, the Northern Eagles were dissolved with Manly-Warringah announcing that they had applied to the NRL to once again be a stand alone club returning to the top grade for the first time since 1999. Kaufusi was not signed on to play with Manly in the 2003 season.

In 2004, Kaufusi signed for Parramatta and made just one appearance against the Wests Tigers at Leichhardt Oval which ended in a 33-6 loss.

Kaufusi played for London Broncos of Super League. He was a Tonga international and represented them at the 2000 Rugby League World Cup.
