= Brad Kelly =

Australian rugby league player

Personal information
- Born: 23 March 1978 (age 47)

Playing information
- Position: Centre, Second-row, Lock
Club
Years	Team	Pld	T	G	FG	P
1999–01	Canberra Raiders	18	2	0	0	8
2002	Northern Eagles	10	1	0	0	4
	Total	28	3	0	0	12

Brad Kelly (born 23 March 1978) is an Australian former professional rugby league player who played for the Canberra Raiders and Northern Eagles in the National Rugby League (NRL).

== Playing career ==
Kelly was graded by the Mal Meninga coached Canberra Raiders in 1998. He made his first grade debut from the bench in his side's 12−4 loss to the Parramatta Eels at Bruce Stadium in round 16 of the 1999 season. The following season, Kelly would play 6 games for Canberra, including his side's 38−10 semi-final loss to the Sydney Roosters in the 2000 season. His final season with Canberra would be the most successful in his 4-year career. He played in 10 games, mostly at centre and scored 2 tries. Kelly was released by Canberra at the end of the 2001 season and joined the ill-fated joint venture club the Northern Eagles.

In 2002, Kelly joined the Northern Eagles. He played 10 games in the 2002 season and scored one try. At the end of the 2002 season, the Northern Eagles were dissolved with the Manly Sea Eagles announcing that they had applied to the NRL to once again be a stand-alone club returning to the top grade for the first time since 1999. Kelly was not offered a contract to play with the returning club and never played first grade rugby league again. In total, Kelly played 28 games and scored 3 tries.

== Post playing ==
Following his retirement from the rugby league, Kelly went on to coach Endeavour Sports High School in the NRL Schoolboy Cup competition.
