= Joel Wilson (rugby) =

Australian rugby union footballer and coach, and rugby league footballer

Personal information
- Born: 7 February 1978 (age 47) Newcastle, New South Wales, Australia

Playing information
- Height: 188 cm (6 ft 2 in)
- Weight: 93 kg (14 st 9 lb)

Rugby union
Club
| Years | Team | Pld | T | G | FG | P |
|---|---|---|---|---|---|---|
| 1996–97 | Northern Suburbs |
| 2001–06 | Brumbies |
| 2006 | Kobelco Steelers |
| | Total | 0 | 0 | 0 | 0 | 0 |
Representative
| Years | Team | Pld | T | G | FG | P |
| 2001 | Australia A | 1 | 0 | 0 | 0 | 0 |

Rugby league
- Position: Centre, Fullback
Club
| Years | Team | Pld | T | G | FG | P |
|---|---|---|---|---|---|---|
| 1998–99 | North Sydney Bears | 21 | 8 | 0 | 0 | 32 |
| 2000 | Northern Eagles | 5 | 0 | 0 | 0 | 0 |
| | Total | 26 | 8 | 0 | 0 | 32 |

Coaching information
Club
| Years | Team | Gms | W | D | L | W% |
| | Northern Suburbs |

Joel Wilson (born 7 February 1978 in Newcastle, New South Wales) is an Australian rugby union coach and a former rugby union player, for the Brumbies in the Super 14 competition, and rugby league player, for the North Sydney Bears and Northern Eagles in the National Rugby League.

== Playing career ==
Wilson won the Sydney Colts premiership with Gordon in 1997, and he was subsequently invited to join the Brumbies for the 1998 pre-season. Wilson went on to play for the rugby league club the North Sydney Bears. He played for two seasons for the Bears, before joining the Northern Eagles in 2000 where he played five matches.

He returned to rugby union in 2001, signing with the Brumbies. He made his Super 12 debut that year against the Cats in Johannesburg. Wilson also went on to represent Australia A that year.

Wilson played his 50th game for the Brumbies against the Highlanders in the second last game of the 2006 regular season. He joined the Kobe Kobelco Steelers in the Top League after the end of the Super 14 season in 2006.

== Coaching career ==
Wilson turned to rugby union coaching after finishing his playing career. He had coaching appointments at Northern Suburbs and at Newington College before being named as assistant coach to the Western Sydney Rams in 2016.
