= Sam Murphy (rugby league) =

Australian rugby league player

Personal information
- Full name: Samuel Arthur Murphy
- Born: 3 June 1981 (age 43); Sydney, New South Wales, Australia

Playing information
- Position: Fullback
Club
Years	Team	Pld	T	G	FG	P
2001–02	Northern Eagles	2	2	0	0	8
2003	Manly Sea Eagles	3	1	0	0	4
	Total	5	3	0	0	12

Sam Murphy (born 3 June 1981) is an Australian former professional rugby league footballer who played as a fullback during the 2000s.

He played for the Northern Eagles and Manly Sea Eagles in the NRL.

== Playing career ==
Murphy was graded by the now defunct Northern Eagles in 2000. He made his first grade debut in his side's 42−34 victory over the Penrith Panthers at Penrith Stadium in round 3 of the 2001 season. Murphy also scored a try on debut. His only other match for the joint venture club came in their 38−12 loss to the Newcastle Knights in round 1 of the 2002 season. Murphy broke his foot during the match and was subsequently ruled out for the rest of the season. At the end of the 2002 season, the Northern Eagles were dissolved with the Manly Sea Eagles announcing that they had applied to the NRL to once again be a stand-alone club returning to the top grade for the first time since 1999. Murphy played with the Sea Eagles until he was released from the club at the end of the 2003 season. In total, he played 5 games and scored 3 tries.
