= Michael Buettner =

Australia international rugby league footballer

Michael Buettner OAM
Personal information
- Born: 30 October 1973 (age 52) Fairfield, New South Wales, Australia

Playing information
- Height: 183 cm (6 ft 0 in)
- Weight: 103 kg (16 st 3 lb)
- Position: Centre, Five-eighth
Club
Years	Team	Pld	T	G	FG	P
1992–95	Parramatta Eels	79	17	73	0	214
1996–99	North Sydney Bears	95	58	2	0	236
2000	Northern Eagles	23	7	2	0	32
2001–02	Parramatta Eels	50	12	0	0	48
2003–04	Wests Tigers	16	2	0	0	8
	Total	263	96	77	0	538
Representative
Years	Team	Pld	T	G	FG	P
1996	Australia	1	2	0	0	8
1997	New South Wales	1	0	0	0	0
1997	NSW City	1	0	0	0	0

Michael Buettner (born 30 October 1973 in Fairfield, New South Wales) is an Australian rugby league official and former professional footballer of the 1990s and 2000s. An Australian international and New South Wales State of Origin representative back, he played club football for the North Sydney Bears, the Northern Eagles, the Parramatta Eels and the Wests Tigers.

== Playing career ==
While attending Westfields Sports High School, Buettner played for the Australian Schoolboys team in 1991.

A Parramatta junior, Buettner made his first-grade début for the Eels in round 4 1992, against the Sydney Roosters at Aussie Stadium on 12 April. At the end of that season he won the Eric Grothe award, as the Eels' rookie of the year.

Buettner spent four seasons in the back-line at Parramatta before moving to the North Sydney Bears as a replacement for centre Ivan Cleary. In 1996, Buettner was selected to represent Australia at five-eighth in a match against Papua New Guinea in Port Moresby. He scored two tries. In the 1996 & 1997 seasons, Buettner was part of The Norths side which made consecutive preliminary final appearances but fell short on both occasions.

Buettner was selected to represent New South Wales as an interchange for game III of the 1997 State of Origin series. In 1998 he scored a North Sydney record 21 tries in a season. In 1999, Buettner played in North Sydney's final ever game as a first grade side which was a 28–18 victory over North Queensland in Townsville with Buettner scoring a try. In 2000, Norths and Manly-Warringah Sea Eagles merged to become the Northern Eagles. Buettner stayed for one season but, like many former North Sydney players, soon left.

For the 2001 NRL season Buettner returned to the Parramatta Eels. He played for Parramatta at five-eighth in their 2001 NRL grand final loss to the Newcastle Knights alongside former North Sydney teammate Jason Taylor. Buettner left the Eels for the Wests Tigers in 2003 but he only played sixteen games in two seasons and retired at the end of the 2004 NRL season.

== Post playing ==
Formerly the NRL's game liaison manager, Buettner is currently competition manager for the National Youth 20s tournament, the Holden Cup. He also serves on the NRL Judiciary, where he is the match review committee coordinator.

In November 2018, Buettner played for the Parramatta Eels in the Legends of League tournament which was held at the Central Coast Stadium in Gosford. The side was captained by Nathan Hindmarsh and made it to the preliminary final before being defeated by The Barbarians.

In November 2019, Buettner Played again for the Parramatta Eels in the Legends of League Tournament, which was held at McDonald Jones Stadium in Newcastle. The side was captained by Nathan Hindmarsh and won the Tournament, defeating the Canterbury-Bankstown Bulldogs in the final.

Buettner was awarded the Medal of the Order of Australia in the 2025 Australia Day Honours for "service to the community and to sport".
