= Daniel Quinn (rugby league) =

Australian rugby league footballer

Personal information
- Full name: Daniel Quinn
- Born: 24 July 1978 (age 47) Maitland, New South Wales, Australia

Playing information
- Position: Second-row, Prop
Club
Years	Team	Pld	T	G	FG	P
2000	Northern Eagles	3	0	0	0	0
2002	Newcastle Knights	1	0	0	0	0
	Total	4	0	0	0	0
- Source: As of 7 February 2019

Daniel Quinn is an Australian former professional rugby league footballer. He played for the Northern Eagles in 2000 and the Newcastle Knights in 2002.

== Background ==
Quinn was born in Maitland, New South Wales.

== Playing career ==
Quinn made his first grade debut for the now defunct Northern Eagles in Round 12 2000 against Brisbane at Brookvale Oval.

In 2002, Quinn joined Newcastle and made 1 appearance for the club which was against the Wests Tigers in Round 15 at Campbelltown Stadium.
