= Mitch Creary =

Australian rugby league footballer

Personal information
- Full name: Mitch Creary
- Born: 30 January 1976 (age 49); Sydney

Playing information
- Position: Wing
Club
| Years | Team | Pld | T | G | FG | P |
|---|---|---|---|---|---|---|
| 2002 | Northern Eagles | 5 | 4 | 0 | 0 | 12 |
| 2003–06 | Manly Sea Eagles | 10 | 4 | 0 | 0 | 16 |
| | Total | 15 | 8 | 0 | 0 | 28 |

Mitch Creary (born 30 January 1976) is an Australian former professional rugby league footballer who played in the 2000s. Creary played in the Australasian National Rugby League (NRL) for the Northern Eagles and Manly-Warringah Sea Eagles between 2002 and 2006. His main position was wing.

== Background ==
Creary was born in Sydney.

== Playing career ==
Creary made his first grade debut for the Northern Eagles in Round 17 2002 against Canterbury-Bankstown at the Sydney Showground (Olympic Park) scoring 2 tries in a 42–22 loss. Creary played in the Northern Eagles final ever game which was a 68–28 loss against Penrith in Round 26 2002 at Brookvale Oval with Creary scoring a try.

At the end of 2002, the Northern Eagles were dissolved with Manly-Warringah announcing that they had applied to the NRL to once again be a stand alone club returning to the top grade for the first time since 1999. Creary played with Manly-Warringah until the end of 2006 before retiring as a player.
