= 2002 Super League Grand Final =

British rugby league championship match

St. Helens	Bradford Bulls
19	18
	1	2	Total
ST H	12	7	19
BRA	8	10	18
- Date: 19 October 2002
- Stadium: Old Trafford
- Location: (England) Manchester
- Harry Sunderland Trophy: (England) Paul Deacon, ( Bradford Bulls)
- Referee: Russell Smith
- Attendance: 61,138

Broadcast partners
- Broadcasters: Sky Sports
- Commentators: Eddie Hemmings; Mike Stephenson

The 2002 Super League Grand Final was the fifth official grand final and conclusive and championship-deciding game of Super League VII. Held on Saturday 19 October 2002 at Old Trafford, Manchester, the game was played between St. Helens and Bradford Bulls. Refereed by Russell Smith, the match was seen by a crowd of 61,138 and was won by St Helens 19 - 18.

== Background ==
	Team	Pld	W	D	L	PF	PA	PD	Pts
1	St Helens	28	23	0	5	927	522	+405	46
2	Bradford Bulls	28	23	0	5	910	519	+391	46

=== Route to the Final ===
==== St Helens ====
St Helens, by finishing top of the table automatically qualified for the play-off semi-final where they were drawn at home to Bradford. A surprising loss saw Saints have to go the long route to the grand final by playing bitter rivals Wigan Warriors in the elimination semi-final; a match they won 24–8 to set up another game against Bradford.

St Helens
Round	Opposition	Score
Semi Final	Bradford Bulls (H)	26–28
Elimination Semi-Final	Wigan Warriors (H)	24–8
Key: (H) = Home venue; (A) = Away venue.

==== Bradford Bulls ====
Bradford as the team finishing second in the season also qualified for the play-off semi-final where they had to travel to St Helens. A close fought game saw Bradford win 28–26 to go straight through to the grand final.

== Match details ==
19 October 2002

Bradford Bulls	18 - 19	St Helens
Tries: Scott Naylor; Robbie Paul; Michael Withers; Goals: Paul Deacon (3)	Report	Tries: Mike Bennett; Sean Long; Martin Gleeson; Goals: Sean Long (3); Drop Goals: Sean Long

Old Trafford, Manchester
Attendance: 61,138
Referee: Russell Smith

Bradford Bulls		Position	St Helens	
1	(Ireland) Michael Withers	Fullback	1	(England) Paul Wellens
2	(Tonga) Tevita Vaikona	Wing	2	(Australia) Darren Albert
3	(England) Scott Naylor	Centre	3	(England) Martin Gleeson
4	(Australia) Brandon Costin	Centre	4	(England) Paul Newlove
5	(Tonga) Lesley Vainikolo	Wing	5	(England) Anthony Stewart
6	(New Zealand) Robbie Paul	Stad Off	6	(England) Paul Sculthorpe
7	(England) Paul Deacon	Scrum half	7	(England) Sean Long
	(New Zealand) Joe Vagana	Prop		(Australia) Darren Britt
9	(England) James Lowes	Fullback	9	(England) Keiron Cunningham
10	(England) Stuart Fielden	Prop		(Australia) Barry Ward
	(Australia) Daniel Gartner	Second Row		(England) Mike Bennett
11	(England) Jamie Peacock	Second Row		(Netherlands) Tim Jonkers
	(England) Mike Forshaw	Loose forward	13	(England) Chris Joynt
	(England) Leon Pryce	Interchange		(New Zealand) Sean Hoppe
	(England) Lee Gilmour	Interchange		(England) Mickey Higham
	(England) Paul Anderson	Interchange		(England) John Stankevitch
	(England) Brian McDermott	Interchange		(Australia) Peter Shiels
	(England) Brian Noble	Coaches		(Australia) Ian Millward
