= Andrew Frew =

Australian rugby league footballer

Personal information
- Born: 9 March 1975 (age 51) Australia

Playing information
- Position: Fullback, Wing, Centre
Club
Years	Team	Pld	T	G	FG	P
1997–98	Parramatta Eels	3	1	0	0	4
1999	Manly Sea Eagles	21	12	0	0	48
2000	Northern Eagles	23	11	0	0	44
2001	Huddersfield Giants	26	15	0	0	60
2002	Wakefield Trinity Wildcats	21	8	0	0	32
2003	Halifax	17	5	0	0	20
2004	St. George Illawarra	1	1	0	0	4
	Total	112	53	0	0	212

Andrew Frew (born 9 March 1975) is an Australian former professional rugby league footballer who played in the 1990s and 2000s. He played at club level for the Parramatta Eels (Note: Parramatta Heritage No. 584), Manly-Warringah Sea Eagles (Note: Manly Heritage No. 436), Northern Eagles (Note: Northern Eagles Heritage No. 4), Huddersfield Giants, Wakefield Trinity Wildcats (Note: Wakefield Trinity Heritage No. 1193), Halifax (Note: Halifax RLFC Heritage No. 1175) and St. George Illawarra Dragons (Note: St George-Illawarra Heritage No. 90), as a winger although he could play centre or fullback if needed.

== Playing career ==
Frew attended Patrician Brothers' College, Fairfield and started his professional career with Sydney's Parramatta Eels club. A noted speedster, he placed second to Newcastle Knights flyer Darren Albert in a rugby league sprint for The NRL Footy Show in 1999 at ES Marks Athletics Field, a race that featured other selected players from the NRL including Justin Loomans (3rd - Souths), Michael De Vere (Brisbane) and Matthew Rieck (Penrith).

== Arrest ==
Frew was arrested in September 2012 and charged with the blackmail of a 58-year-old Lane Cove man. The man repeatedly gave Frew money as he was concerned that Frew would send information of an alleged sexual abuse of Frew's partner (at a time she was an underage prostitute) to his friends suggesting the victim was a pedophile.

Police say Frew and another woman drove the man to ATMs between 16 June and July 2012, forcing him to withdraw thousands of dollars from ATMs.

The court heard Frew and his co-accused, a 38-year-old woman, went to the man's house, where he lived with his elderly father, and demanded money, when searched by police, the drug ice was found in his anus.

On 14 May 2013, Frew was jailed for one-year and placed on a corrections order for his role in blackmailing the 58-year-old man. On 20 May 2025, it was revealed that Frew had no showed his own sentence hearing but was still convicted following an incident that took place in April 2024. It was reported that Frew had been charged for recklessly dealing with the proceeds of crime to the amount of $13,900 and failing to appear in accordance with his bail conditions. Frew was convicted and fined $5000 after originally pleading not guilty and was also sentenced to a community corrections order of two years.

On 24 March 2025, Frew pleaded guilty to several charges including drug supply and drug possession. Frew was arrested in December 2024 after he was caught dealing 3.4 grams of methamphetamine in exchange for $500, police then found several drugs - 5.7 grams of cocaine and 9 grams of methamphetamine - and thousands of dollars inside his apartment complex in Zetland.
