= Grant Wooden =

Australian rugby league footballer (born 1979)

Personal information
- Full name: Grant Wooden
- Born: 1 August 1979 (age 45); Sydney, New South Wales, Australia

Playing information
- Position: Prop
Club
Years	Team	Pld	T	G	FG	P
2002	Northern Eagles	6	0	0	0	0
2003	Manly Warringah	4	0	0	0	0
	Total	10	0	0	0	0
- Source: As of 25 January 2023

Grant Wooden (born 1 August 1979) is an Australian former professional rugby league footballer who played in the 2000s. He played for Manly Warringah and the Northern Eagles in the NRL competition.

== Playing career ==
Wooden made his first grade debut for the Northern Eagles in round 3 of the 2002 NRL season against South Sydney. Wooden played off the bench in the Northern Eagles 44-20 loss. Wooden played a total of six games for the club including their last ever game which came in round 26 against Penrith where they lost 68-28. Following the conclusion of the 2002 season, the merger between North Sydney and Manly was dissolved with Manly regaining the NRL licence ahead of the 2003 NRL season. Wooden played in Manly's first game back in the NRL since 1999 when they faced off against North Queensland in round 2 of the competition. Wooden played a further three games for Manly before being released. Wooden would later go on to play in the QLD Cup competition and for various NSW Country teams.
