= Greg Ebrill =

Australian rugby league footballer

Personal information
- Born: 25 May 1979 (age 47) Newcastle, New South Wales, Australia

Playing information
- Position: Second-row, Lock
Club
Years	Team	Pld	T	G	FG	P
1999	Manly Warringah Sea Eagles	6	0	0	0	0
2000–01	Northern Eagles	33	1	0	0	4
2002	Salford City Reds	22	1	0	0	4
	Total	61	2	0	0	8

Greg Ebrill (born 25 May 1979) is an Australian former professional rugby league footballer who played in the 1990s and 2000s. He played for the Manly Warringah Sea Eagles, Northern Eagles, and Salford City Reds he primarily played second-row forward.

== Playing career ==
Ebrill made his first grade debut for the Manly Warringah Sea Eagles from the bench in his side's 28−22 victory over the North Sydney Bears at North Sydney Oval in round 20 of the 1999 season. With the dissolution of the Sea Eagles at season's end, Ebrill's stint at the Sea Eagles ended at the conclusion of the 1999 season, He played 6 games for the Sea Eagles.

In 2000, Ebrill joined the newly formed Northern Eagles following the Seas Eagles' merger. He played his last game for the Eagles in his side's 38-22 loss to eventual minor premiers the Parramatta Eels at Parramatta Stadium in round 25 of the 2001 season. After two seasons in which the Northern Eagles merger was wracked by internal strife and poor team performances, Ebrill left the Northern Eagles at the end of the 2001 season. He played 33 games and scored 1 try for the Northern Eagles.

In 2002, Ebrill joined English Super League side, the Salford City Reds. After playing 22 games and scoring 1 try for the Reds, Ebrill left Salford at the end of the 2002 Super League season.

== Post playing ==
Following his retirement from rugby league, Ebrill has since worked as a construction worker in the Newcastle area.
