= Barry Ward (rugby league) =

Australian rugby league footballer

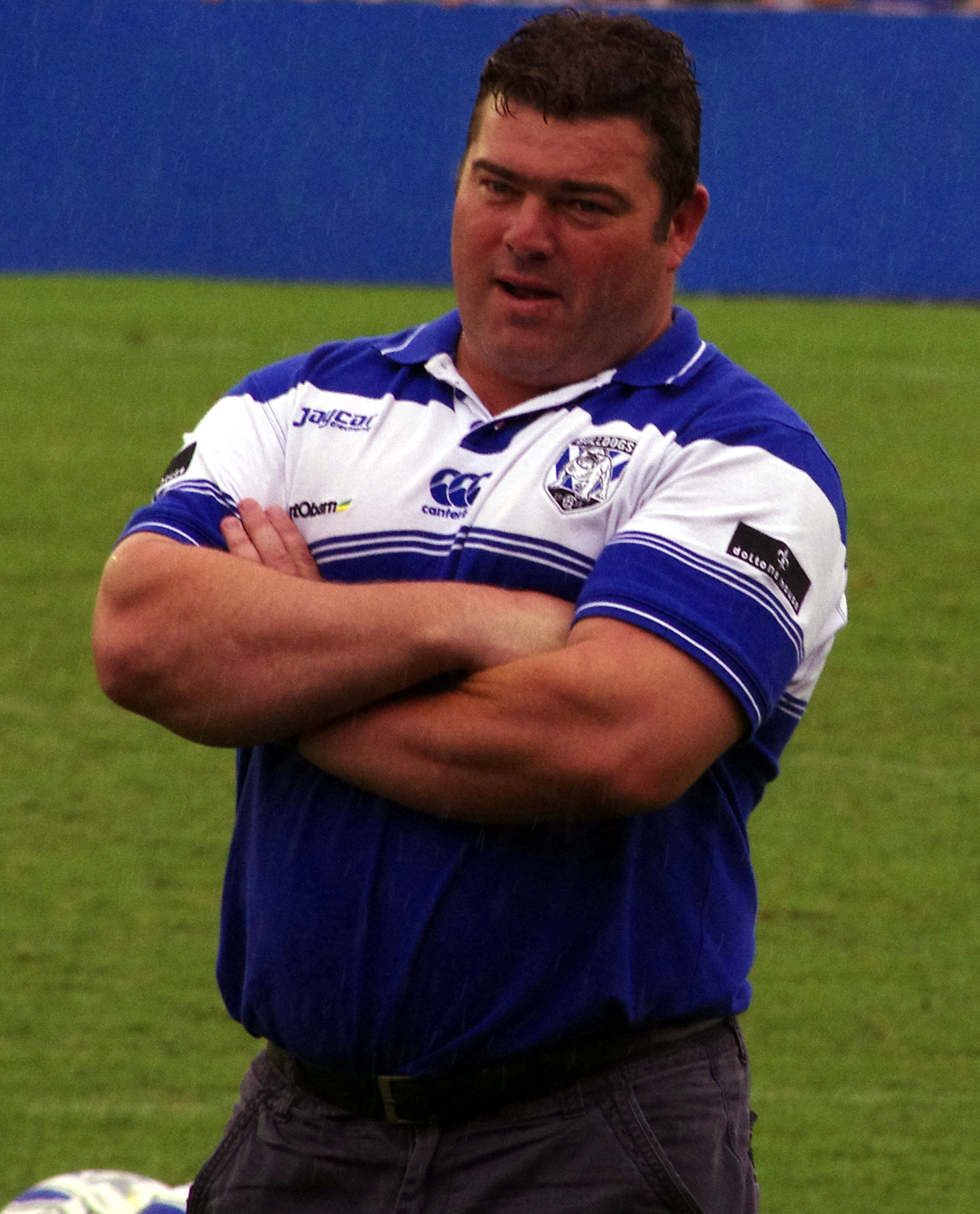

Personal information
- Full name: Barry William Ward
- Born: 13 January 1971 (age 55) New South Wales, Australia

Playing information
- Position: Prop, Second-row
Club
| Years | Team | Pld | T | G | FG | P |
|---|---|---|---|---|---|---|
| 1990–93 | Canterbury-Bankstown | 11 | 0 | 0 | 0 | 0 |
| 1994 | Illawarra Steelers | 12 | 1 | 0 | 0 | 4 |
| 1995 | Eastern Suburbs | 2 | 1 | 0 | 0 | 4 |
| 1997–01 | Canterbury-Bankstown | 80 | 4 | 0 | 0 | 16 |
| 2002–03 | St Helens | 69 | 5 | 0 | 0 | 20 |
| | Total | 174 | 11 | 0 | 0 | 44 |
Representative
| Years | Team | Pld | T | G | FG | P |
| 2001 | NSW City | 1 | 0 | 0 | 0 | 0 |
- Source: As of 23 January 2019

Barry Ward (born 13 January 1971 in New South Wales), is an Australian former professional rugby league footballer who played in the 1990s and 2000s.

He played for the Canterbury-Bankstown Bulldogs for nine seasons between 1990-1993 and 1997–2001, the Illawarra Steelers for one season in 1994, Eastern Suburbs for one season in 1995 and St. Helens as a prop and in the second-row. He played over 100 first grade games during his long NRL career.

== Playing career ==
In 1998, Ward was fined for racial vilification towards Anthony Mundine.

Ward played for St. Helens at prop forward in their 2002 Super League Grand Final victory against the Bradford Bulls. Having won Super League VI, St Helens contested the 2003 World Club Challenge against 2002 NRL Premiers, the Sydney Roosters. Ward played from the interchange bench in Saints' 38–0 loss.

== Post playing ==
In 2008, Ward became a member of the Canterbury Bulldogs Football Club board. Ward relinquished membership of the board in late 2011 when he was named coach of the NSW Cup team.
