= Damian Driscoll =

Australian rugby league footballer (b.1972)

Personal information
- Born: 12 May 1972 (age 53)

Playing information
- Position: Prop
Club
Years	Team	Pld	T	G	FG	P
1995	Western Suburbs	8	0	0	0	0
1996–98	Gold Coast Chargers	57	2	0	0	8
1999	Manly-Warringah	11	1	0	0	4
2000	Northern Eagles	5	0	0	0	0
2001	Salford	24	1	0	0	4
	Total	105	4	0	0	16

Damian Driscoll (born 12 May 1972) is a former professional rugby league footballer who played as a prop for the Western Suburbs Magpies, Gold Coast Chargers, Manly-Warringah Sea Eagles, Northern Eagles and Salford City Reds in the 1990s and 2000s.
