= Ben Walker =

Australian rugby league footballer

Personal information
- Born: 13 September 1976 (age 50) Toowoomba, Queensland, Australia

Playing information
- Height: 180 cm (5 ft 11 in)
- Weight: 89 kg (14 st 0 lb)
- Position: Five-eighth, Halfback
Club
Years	Team	Pld	T	G	FG	P
1995	Brisbane Broncos	2	0	0	0	0
1995–96	London Broncos	16	6	5	3	37
1996–00	Brisbane Broncos	70	13	95	0	242
2001	Northern Eagles	26	18	103	1	279
2002	Leeds Rhinos	28	12	119	0	286
2003	Manly Sea Eagles	16	5	59	0	138
2005–06	South Sydney	21	5	43	3	109
	Total	179	59	424	7	1091

Coaching information
Club
Years	Team	Gms	W	D	L	W%
2011–20	Ipswich Jets
2020–	Western Clydesdales
	Total	0	0	0	0
- Relatives: Shane Walker (brother); Chris Walker (brother); Sam Walker (son); Katie Walker (sister-in-law)

Ben Walker (born 13 September 1976) is an Australian professional rugby league coach who is the co-head coach of the Western Clydesdales in the Queensland Cup and a former professional rugby league footballer who played in the 1990s and 2000s. A five-eighth or halfback, he played in Australia's National Rugby League for the Brisbane Broncos, Northern Eagles, Manly-Warringah Sea Eagles and the South Sydney Rabbitohs, as well as in the Super League for the London Broncos and Leeds Rhinos.

== Background ==
Walker was born in Toowoomba in Southern Queensland on 13 September 1976, and is the eldest of a trio of brothers who would all become rugby league footballers. While attending St Mary's Christian Brothers College in Toowoomba in 1993, Walker was selected in the Australian Schoolboys team.

== Playing career ==
Walker, along with his brothers, Shane Walker and Chris Walker, all began their careers with the Brisbane Broncos. His premiership début was in round 13 of the 1995 ARL season against the Parramatta Eels at Parramatta Stadium on 25 June 1995. Walker was selected to play for the Brisbane Broncos in the 1997 Super League Grand Final from the interchange bench.

In the 1998 NRL season, Walker made 23 appearances for Brisbane and played in the club's preliminary final victory over the Sydney City Roosters but missed out on selection for the grand final team which defeated Canterbury-Bankstown at the Sydney Football Stadium.

In the 2000 NRL season, Walker was limited to only 11 games for Brisbane and missed out on playing in the club's premiership victory over the Sydney Roosters at Stadium Australia.

Playing for the Northern Eagles in the 2001 National Rugby League season, Walker was the equal competition leading point scorer (along with Newcastle's Andrew Johns) with 279 points (17 tries, 102 goals, 1 field goal) in 26 games, receiving the Dally M Award for Top Points Scorer. Walker had kicked 102 of his 125 shots on goal, a percentage of 82.40 for the season. This stands as the most ever points scored by a five-eighth in a single National Rugby League season. Walker's 279 points is also the most points ever scored for the short lived Northern Eagles (2000–02) and the most points in a season by an Eagles player. Even though he only played for the Eagles in 2001, Walker's 279 points for the season remains the club record (The Northern Eagles played from 2000 to 2002). The next highest scorer for the club is Brendon Reeves who scored 130 points (30 tries, 5/10 goals) in 66 games from 2000 to 2002.

Walker was the first player in the NRL to score during golden point (extra-time). He kicked a penalty goal for Manly against Parramatta at Brookvale Oval on 18 May 2003.

Walker later joined his brother Shane at South Sydney.

Walker spent two years at Souths and his last in the 2006 NRL season saw the club finish last on the table and claim the wooden spoon.

== Post playing ==
He resides in Toowoomba and is a real estate agent.
