= David Moffat (rugby league) =

Australian rugby league footballer

Personal information
- Full name: David Moffat
- Born: 17 June 1971 (age 55) Australia

Playing information
- Position: Second-row, Prop
Club
Years	Team	Pld	T	G	FG	P
1992–93	Runcorn Highfield	3	0	0	0	0
1996	Hull FC	18	5	0	0	20
	Total	21	5	0	0	20
Representative
Years	Team	Pld	T	G	FG	P
1996	Ireland	1	0	0	0	0
- Source: As of 21 October 2010

David "Dave" Moffat (born 17 June 1971) is a former professional rugby league footballer who played in the 1990s. He played at representative level for Ireland, and at club level for Hull FC.

== International honours ==
Dave Moffat won a cap for Ireland while at Hull during 1996.
