= Shayne Dunley =

Australian rugby league footballer

Personal information
- Full name: Shayne Dunley
- Born: 17 May 1976 (age 49); Sydney, New South Wales, Australia

Playing information
- Position: Halfback, Hooker
Club
Years	Team	Pld	T	G	FG	P
1998–99	Balmain	28	3	0	0	12
2000	Wests Tigers	1	0	0	0	0
2001–02	Northern Eagles	17	2	0	0	8
2003	Parramatta Eels	14	3	0	0	12
2004–07	Manly-Warringah	70	6	0	0	24
	Total	130	14	0	0	56

Shayne Dunley (born 17 May 1976) is an Australian former professional rugby league footballer who played in the 1990s and 2000s, he played in the National Rugby League (NRL) between 1998 and 2007. He played as either a halfback or hooker.

== Playing career ==
Dunley made his NRL debut for the Balmain Tigers in Round 1 of the 1998 season against the Gold Coast Chargers. Dunley played for Balmain in their last season as a first grade side before they merged with fellow foundation club Western Suburbs for the 2000 season. In 2001, Dunley joined the now defunct Northern Eagles and played in the club's last ever game which was a 68–28 loss against Penrith.

In 2003, Dunley joined Parramatta and played one season for them before signing with Manly-Warringah. In 2005, Dunley was charged with grade five contrary conduct for allegedly spitting at Parramatta utility PJ Marsh. Dunley was later suspended for three matches. Dunley retired at the end of the 2007 season.
