= Dallas Weston =

Australian rugby league footballer

Personal information
- Born: 25 February 1971 (age 55)

Playing information
- Position: Second-row
Club
Years	Team	Pld	T	G	FG	P
1993–95	Parramatta Eels	22	0	0	0	0
1996	North Sydney Bears	9	0	0	0	0
1998–00	Parramatta Eels	46	3	0	0	12
	Total	77	3	0	0	12
Representative
Years	Team	Pld	T	G	FG	P
1993	NSW City	1	0	0	0	0
2006	Malta	1	0	0	0	0
- Source: As of 13 June 2018

Dallas Weston (born 25 February 1971) is an Australian former professional rugby league footballer who played for the Parramatta Eels and the North Sydney Bears in the National Rugby League. Weston played as a second-row forward.

== Playing career ==
Weston made his first grade debut for Parramatta against Penrith in round 1 of the 1993 season. Weston was selected to represent New South Wales City in 1993 despite having only played five first grade games. In 1996, Weston joined North Sydney and played one season with the club before returning to Parramatta. Weston was part of the 1998 Parramatta side which suffered preliminary final heartbreak to Canterbury. After leading 18–2 with 10 minutes to go, Parramatta would go on to lose the game 32–20. Weston played two more seasons for Parramatta before being released at the end of the 2000 season. In 2006, Weston played one test for Malta against Lebanon.
