= Karl Lovell =

New Zealand rugby league footballer (1977–2026)

Personal information
- Born: 9 December 1977 Auckland, New Zealand
- Died: 11 July 2026 (aged 48)

Playing information
- Position: Prop, Second-row, Centre
Club
Years	Team	Pld	T	G	FG	P
1997–1998	Parramatta Eels	37	7	1	0	30
1999	Sheffield Eagles	26	8	0	0	32
2000	Huddersfield-Sheffield	14	5	0	0	20
2001	Northern Eagles	2	0	0	0	0
2002	Cronulla-Sutherland	16	4	0	0	16
	Total	95	24	1	0	98
- Source: As of 18 January 2019

Karl Lovell (9 December 1977 – 11 July 2026) was a New Zealand professional rugby league footballer who played for the Parramatta Eels, Northern Eagles and the Cronulla-Sutherland Sharks in the NRL between 1997 and 2002. He played for the Budgewoi Bulldogs and the Toukley Hawks as a junior. Throughout this he also played for the Sheffield Eagles and the joint Sheffield and Huddersfield merger side in the Super League between 1999 and 2000. His preferred position was either prop or second-row, however he also at times played at centre or on the wing.

== Playing career ==
Lovell made his first grade debut for Parramatta in Round 1 1997 against North Sydney. Lovell played in both finals games for the club in the same year against Newcastle and Norths which ended in defeat. This was the first time since 1986 that the club had qualified for the finals.

In 1998, Parramatta finished 4th and Lovell was a regular starter in the team. Lovell played in all 3 finals games for the club including wins against Norths and eventual premiers Brisbane and the heartbreaking preliminary final loss to arch rivals Canterbury.

With Parramatta leading 18–2 with less than 10 minutes to play, Canterbury staged a comeback scoring 3 tries in 8 minutes with Canterbury player Daryl Halligan kicking 2 goals from the sideline to tie the game at 18-18. Parramatta player Paul Carige then made a series of personal errors which cost Parramatta dearly in extra time with Canterbury going on to win 32–20. The game is often referred to as one of the biggest preliminary final chokes of all time and this would be Lovell's last match for the club.

He then moved to England and played with Huddersfield-Sheffield before returning to Australia in 2001 to play with the now defunct Northern Eagles. Lovell finished his career with Cronulla-Sutherland and his last game in first grade was the 2002 preliminary final loss against the New Zealand Warriors.

== Death ==
Lovell died on 11 July 2026, at the age of 48, after a short battle with lung cancer.
