= Julian Bailey (rugby league) =

Australian rugby league footballer

Personal information
- Full name: Julian Bailey
- Born: 17 November 1978 (age 47) Singleton, New South Wales, Australia

Playing information
- Position: Centre
Club
Years	Team	Pld	T	G	FG	P
1998–00	Eastern Suburbs	50	6	0	0	24
2001–02	Newcastle Knights	39	9	0	0	36
2003–04	Huddersfield	52	14	0	0	56
	Total	141	29	0	0	116
- Source: As of 7 February 2019

Julian Bailey is a former professional rugby league footballer who played in the 1990s and 2000s. He played for Eastern Suburbs, later renamed the "Sydney City Roosters", from 1998 to 2000 and the Newcastle Knights from 2001 to 2002. He then played for the Huddersfield Giants from 2003 to 2004.

== Background ==
Bailey was born in Singleton, New South Wales. He was a Hunter Mariners junior.

== Playing career ==
Bailey began his first grade career with Eastern Suburbs later to be renamed as the "Sydney City Roosters". Bailey played 3 seasons with the club but missed out on playing in the 2000 NRL grand final against Brisbane.

In 2001, Bailey joined Newcastle and played 24 games for the club but was not included in the club's premiership winning side who defeated Parramatta in the grand final. Bailey played on in 2002 with Newcastle and his last game for the club was the 38-12 semi final loss against his old club the Sydney Roosters.

In 2003, Bailey joined the English side Huddersfield and spent 2 years with them before retiring.
