= Brett Grogan =

Australian rugby league footballer

Personal information
- Full name: Brett Grogan
- Born: 30 August 1973 (age 52) Newcastle, New South Wales, Australia

Playing information
- Position: Wing, Centre
Club
Years	Team	Pld	T	G	FG	P
1994–98	Newcastle Knights	62	26	0	0	104
1999	Gateshead Thunder	22	3	0	0	12
2000	Northern Eagles	10	2	0	0	8
	Total	94	31	0	0	124

Brett Grogan (born 30 August 1973) is an Australian former rugby league footballer who played in the 1990s and 2000s. He played for the Newcastle Knights from 1994 to 1998, the Gateshead Thunder in 1999 and finally the Northern Eagles in 2000.

== Playing career ==
Grogan made his first grade debut for Newcastle in round 22 of the 1994 NSWRL season against Illawarra at WIN Stadium. In 1995, Grogan played 13 games including the clubs preliminary final loss to Manly. In 1997, Grogan played 12 games including two finals games against Parramatta and Manly however he did not feature in the preliminary final or grand final victory itself. Grogan's final game for Newcastle was their elimination finals loss to Canterbury in 1998. In 1999, Grogan played for the original Gateshead club in the Super League but he returned to Australia after the club folded at the end of the season. In 2000, Grogan played in the Northern Eagles first ever match which was against Newcastle in round 1 of the 2000 NRL season.

== Personal life ==
In 2009, Grogan was awarded damages in court after he was racially abused at the Sydney Junction Hotel in Newcastle. Grogan had attempted to enter the pub when the security guard stopped him and allegedly said "your kind aren't allowed in".
