= Steve Reardon =

Australian rugby league footballer

Personal information
- Full name: Steve Reardon
- Born: 5 August 1971 (age 53); Temora, New South Wales, Australia

Playing information
- Position: Second-row, Lock
Club
Years	Team	Pld	T	G	FG	P
1991–03	Canterbury Bankstown	163	15	0	0	60

Steve Reardon (born 5 August 1971) is a former professional rugby league footballer. He played his entire career for the Canterbury-Bankstown Bulldogs as a second-row and lock.

== Background ==
Reardon was born in Temora, New South Wales, Australia.

== Playing career ==
Reardon made his first grade debut for Canterbury against arch rivals Parramatta in 1991. Reardon played mainly reserve grade in his first few seasons at Canterbury and was not included in the 1994 and 1995 grand final squads. Reardon played from the interchange bench for the Canterbury-Bankstown Bulldogs in their loss at the 1998 NRL grand final to the Brisbane Broncos. Reardon played his last match for Canterbury in their 2003 preliminary final loss against the Sydney Roosters.

Reardon captain-coached the Temora Dragons to the 2004 Group 9 premiership.
