= Robert Miles (rugby league) =

Australian rugby league footballer

Personal information
- Full name: Robert Miles
- Born: 21 August 1976 (age 49) Sydney, New South Wales, Australia

Playing information
- Position: Wing, Centre, Fullback
Club
Years	Team	Pld	T	G	FG	P
1997–00	Sydney Roosters	66	27	1	0	110
2001–02	Northern Eagles	42	10	0	0	40
2003–05	Wests Tigers	28	4	0	0	16
	Total	136	41	1	0	166
- Source: As of 22 January 2019

Robert Miles (born 21 August 1976) is an Australian former professional rugby league footballer who played in 1990s and 2000s, he played in the National Rugby League (NRL) for the Sydney City Roosters, Northern Eagles and the Wests Tigers. His regular position was wing, however he also played as a centre and at fullback during his NRL career.

== Background ==
Robert Miles was born in Sydney, New South Wales, Australia.

== Playing career ==
Miles made his first grade debut for Eastern Suburbs, now known as the "Sydney Roosters" in Round 1 1997 against South Queensland. Miles spent 4 years at the club before joining the now defunct Northern Eagles in 2001. Miles played in the club's last ever game which was a 68–28 loss against Penrith with Miles scoring a try in the match. In 2003, Miles joined Wests Tigers and played 3 seasons with the club including being a part of the winning 2004 Rugby League World Sevens side. Miles retired at the end of 2005.
