= Wade Forrester =

Australian rugby league footballer

Personal information
- Full name: Wade Forrester
- Born: 23 March 1976 (age 50)

Playing information
- Position: Second-row, Lock
Club
Years	Team	Pld	T	G	FG	P
1997–99	Cronulla-Sutherland	37	3	1	0	14
2001	St. George Illawarra	2	1	0	0	4
2002	Northern Eagles	15	3	0	0	12
	Total	54	7	1	0	30

Wade Forrester (born 23 March 1976) is an Australian former rugby league footballer.

Forrester played for the Cronulla-Sutherland Sharks for three seasons between 1997 and 1999, the St. George Illawarra Dragons in 2001 and the Northern Eagles in 2002.

== Playing career ==
Forrester began his first grade career for Cronulla in 1997 during which the club had joined the rival super league competition. Forrester made 10 appearances but did not feature in the 1997 grand final. In 1999, Forrester made 6 appearances for Cronulla as the club won the minor premiership but did not play in the finals series. Forrester then went on to play 1 season for St George Illawarra in 2001 and then played a season with the now defunct Northern Eagles before retiring at the end of 2002.
