= Ben Sammut =

Former Malta international rugby league footballer

Personal information
- Born: 13 February 1975 (age 51) Australia

Playing information
- Position: Fullback, Hooker, Five-eighth
Club
Years	Team	Pld	T	G	FG	P
1993–98	Cronulla Sharks	56	9	1	0	38
1999	Gateshead	28	6	17	0	58
2000	Hull FC	23	4	78	0	172
2001	Cronulla Sharks	1	0	0	0	0
	Total	108	19	96	0	268
Representative
Years	Team	Pld	T	G	FG	P
2005–06	Malta	2	0	3	0	6

Coaching information
Representative
Years	Team	Gms	W	D	L	W%
2023–	Malta	1	1	0	0	100
- Source: As of 15 August 2026

Ben Sammut (born 13 February 1975) is a former professional rugby league footballer who played primarily as a fullback in the 1990s and 2000s, for Gateshead Thunder and Hull FC in England, and Cronulla Sharks in the NRL.

== Coaching ==
On 28 October 2023 it was reported that he had taken up the role of head-coach for Malta
