= Darren Britt =

Australia international rugby league footballer

Personal information
- Full name: Darren James Britt
- Born: 9 October 1969 (age 57) Orange, New South Wales, Australia

Playing information
- Height: 194 cm (6 ft 4 in)
- Weight: 108 kg (17 st 0 lb)
- Position: Prop
Club
Years	Team	Pld	T	G	FG	P
1989–93	Western Suburbs	59	2	0	0	8
1994–01	Canterbury Bulldogs	168	10	0	0	40
2002–03	St Helens	49	4	0	0	16
	Total	276	16	0	0	64
Representative
Years	Team	Pld	T	G	FG	P
1998–00	Australia	9	0	0	0	0
2001	NSW Country	1	1	0	0	4
- Relatives: Dean Britt (son)

Darren Britt (born 9 October 1969) is an Australian former rugby league footballer who played as a prop in the 1990s and 2000s.

He played for Western Suburbs and the Canterbury-Bankstown Bulldogs in the NRL. He also represented the Australian national side.

== Background ==
Britt was born in Orange, New South Wales, Australia.

== Career ==
Britt captained Canterbury in 92 first grade matches in 1996 and on a full-time basis during 1998–2001, second only to Terry Lamb who led them on 120 occasions.

Britt played at prop forward and captained the Canterbury-Bankstown Bulldogs in their loss at the 1998 NRL grand final to the Brisbane Broncos. Britt was selected for the Australian team to compete in the end of season 1999 Rugby League Tri-Nations tournament. In the final against New Zealand he played at prop forward in the Kangaroos' 22–20 victory.

Britt played two seasons in the Super League with English club St. Helens in 2002 and 2003. He played for St. Helens at prop in their 2002 Super League Grand Final victory against the Bradford Bulls. Having won Super League VI, St Helens contested the 2003 World Club Challenge against 2002 NRL Premiers, the Sydney Roosters. Britt played at prop in Saints' 38–0 loss.

After retirement he served on the NRL Judiciary.
