= Jason Taylor (rugby league) =

Australian rugby league footballer and coach

Jason "JT" Taylor

Personal information
- Full name: Jason Dean Taylor
- Born: 2 February 1971 (age 55) Sydney, New South Wales, Australia
- Height: 173 cm (5 ft 8 in)
- Weight: 72 kg (11 st 5 lb)

Playing information
- Position: Halfback
Club
Years	Team	Pld	T	G	FG	P
1990–93	Western Suburbs	86	6	225	12	486
1994–99	North Sydney Bears	147	32	563	20	1274
2000	Northern Eagles	17	1	38	2	82
2001	Parramatta Eels	26	8	116	1	265
	Total	276	47	942	35	2107
Representative
Years	Team	Pld	T	G	FG	P
1993	New South Wales	3	0	0	0	0
1993–95	NSW City	3	0	3	1	7

Coaching information
Club
Years	Team	Gms	W	D	L	W%
2006	Parramatta Eels	16	10	0	6	63
2007–09	South Sydney	73	31	1	41	42
2015–17	Wests Tigers	51	20	0	31	39
	Total	140	61	1	78	44

Jason Taylor (born 2 February 1971) is an Australian professional rugby league football coach who is the head coach of the Canterbury-Bankstown Bulldogs in the New South Wales Cup and a former professional rugby league footballer who played as a halfback in the 1990s and 2000s.

He was the assistant coach of the Sydney Roosters in 2018 when the club won the premiership that year. He was also previously the head coach of the Parramatta Eels, South Sydney Rabbitohs and the Wests Tigers in the National Rugby League (NRL). A New South Wales State of Origin representative goal-kicking halfback of the 1990s and early 2000s, Taylor set a number of point-scoring and appearance records in the NRL during a twelve-year career with the Western Suburbs Magpies, North Sydney Bears, Northern Eagles and Parramatta Eels.

== Background ==
Taylor was born in Sydney, New South Wales, Australia.

He spent his junior years at Green Valley JRLFC and the Ashcroft Stallions JRLFC, in Sydney's south-western suburbs. He first attended Ashcroft High School before spending his late teenage years St Gregory's College, Campbelltown.

== Playing career ==
Taylor played for Sydney's Western Suburbs Magpies from 1990 to 1993. Starting from the bench for the first two games of the 1990 season, Taylor spent most of the season playing five-eighth outside Ivan Henjak. Still a teenager, he was often called "baby-faced". In what was a poor season for the Magpies, Taylor was described as "the best of the babies" in the NSWRL for the season.

1991 saw the arrival of premiership-winning former Canterbury-Bankstown Bulldogs coach Warren Ryan and big-name, premiership-winning former Bulldogs players Andrew Farrar, David Gillespie and Paul Langmack at the Magpies. Taylor, now playing halfback, led the team to its first semi-finals appearance in nine years after starring in a play-off for fifth spot.

Wests made the final series again in 1992, but Taylor was temporarily benched mid-season. Ongoing conflict with Ryan saw Taylor seeking an early release from his contract. The release was not granted and Taylor remained for the 1993 season. Taylor said, "The press came up with some interesting reasons why I wanted to leave, but I prefer to keep most of them to myself because they have been pretty well resolved. One reason, however, was I thought our style of play was too restrictive, too structured and by the end of the year, very predictable. I wasn't the only player to think that way.”

Ryan stated in 1993, "I've made every effort to rectify the things that were buggering him up last year. I did the same thing with Benny Elias when I was at Balmain. Jason is very, very talented mentally. We've rectified the problem we had and taken every step to resurrect his game. And to his credit, when we told him he wouldn't be released, he wasn't negative at all. He's done a lot of sprint work and he's worked hard." Later that season, Ryan suspended Taylor from first grade after an "outburst" aimed at Langmack at half-time in a match. The Wests Magpies board later overturned the suspension.

In 1993, Taylor made his representative debut with City Origin, playing from the bench. Described as "the form player of the premiership" in 1994, Country Rugby League general manager David Barnhill claimed that Taylor should be eligible to play for the Country team due to his time spent at St. Gregory’s. He ended up playing halfback for City for the next two years.

Taylor was also selected to play for the New South Wales team in the 1993 State of Origin series. He was chosen on the bench for all three games, but did not take the field in the first game of the series. Coach Phil Gould said, "if anything happened to Ricky we needed a capable and experienced halfback to go in with a similar game-type to Ricky. Jason's kicking and passing game is along the same lines and would allow fellows like Daley and Fittler the same room as if they were playing with Ricky."

Taylor played with the North Sydney Bears from 1994 to 1999. While at North Sydney, Taylor played a pivotal role in the team and set numerous records. Taylor also won Rothmans Medal in 1996 as the game's best and fairest player. Taylor has scored more points for the North Sydney Bears than any other player to have ever played for the club with 1274 points.

In January 1997, Taylor was escorted from the Sydney Cricket Ground following unruly behaviour at a one-day international cricket match. It was alleged that Taylor and some of his North Sydney teammates had been backing up from a buck’s party the night before when they proceeded to urinate in plastic cups and throw it over patrons during a Mexican wave. Taylor was then axed as an Australia Day ambassador by Central Coast organisers.

In the 1997 preliminary final against the Newcastle Knights, Taylor missed three out of five conversions in North Sydney's 17–12 defeat, the most crucial when scores were locked at 12-12 after Taylor set up Michael Buettner for a try moments before. With three minutes remaining, Norths had a chance to play in their first grand final in 54 years if Taylor were to kick the subsequent goal. The normally reliable Taylor missed the conversion and Newcastle player Matthew Johns went down the other end of the field and kicked a field goal to make it 13–12. With seconds remaining, Norths frantically threw the ball around the field, only to lose possession. Newcastle player Owen Craigie swooped on a loose pass and raced away to score the match-sealing try. This was North Sydney's fourth preliminary final defeat in six years.

In the 1998 NRL season, Taylor made 26 appearances as Norths finished fifth on the table. Taylor played in both finals matches against Parramatta and Canterbury-Bankstown, both of which ended in defeat.

Taylor as coach of the Rabbitohs

Taylor captained Norths in what would be the club's last season in the top grade. He played in North Sydney's last game in the NRL which came against North Queensland at the Willows Sports Complex. Taylor scored two tries and kicked three goals in a 28–18 victory.

Taylor remained with North Sydney for their merger with the Manly-Warringah Sea Eagles to form the Northern Eagles in 2000, but was released by the club at the end of the season.

Without a club for the next year, Taylor wrote a letter to Parramatta Eels coach Brian Smith and joined the club for the 2001 season. His performance that year was described as "close to the greatest comeback ever in big-time rugby league." Taylor's last match was for Parramatta at halfback in their 2001 NRL grand final loss to the Newcastle Knights.

While at Parramatta, Taylor set a new all-time point-scoring record, breaking Daryl Halligan's mark of 2,034. Between 1992 and 2000 (and across three clubs) Taylor played 194 games in succession, also a standing record, 20 games clear of Hazem El Masri's 174.

Taylor retired with the record for most career points in the National Rugby League and its predecessors. He scored 2,107 first grade career points, a mark later surpassed by Newcastle Knights halfback Andrew Johns in July 2006, then again by Canterbury-Bankstown Bulldogs winger Hazem El Masri in March 2009, then once again by Melbourne Storm hooker Cameron Smith in April 2019. He retired holding the record for most first grade career goals at 942 a mark later surpassed by Cameron Smith in May 2016. Taylor was the Australian Rugby League's top point-scorer in seasons 1996 and 1997.

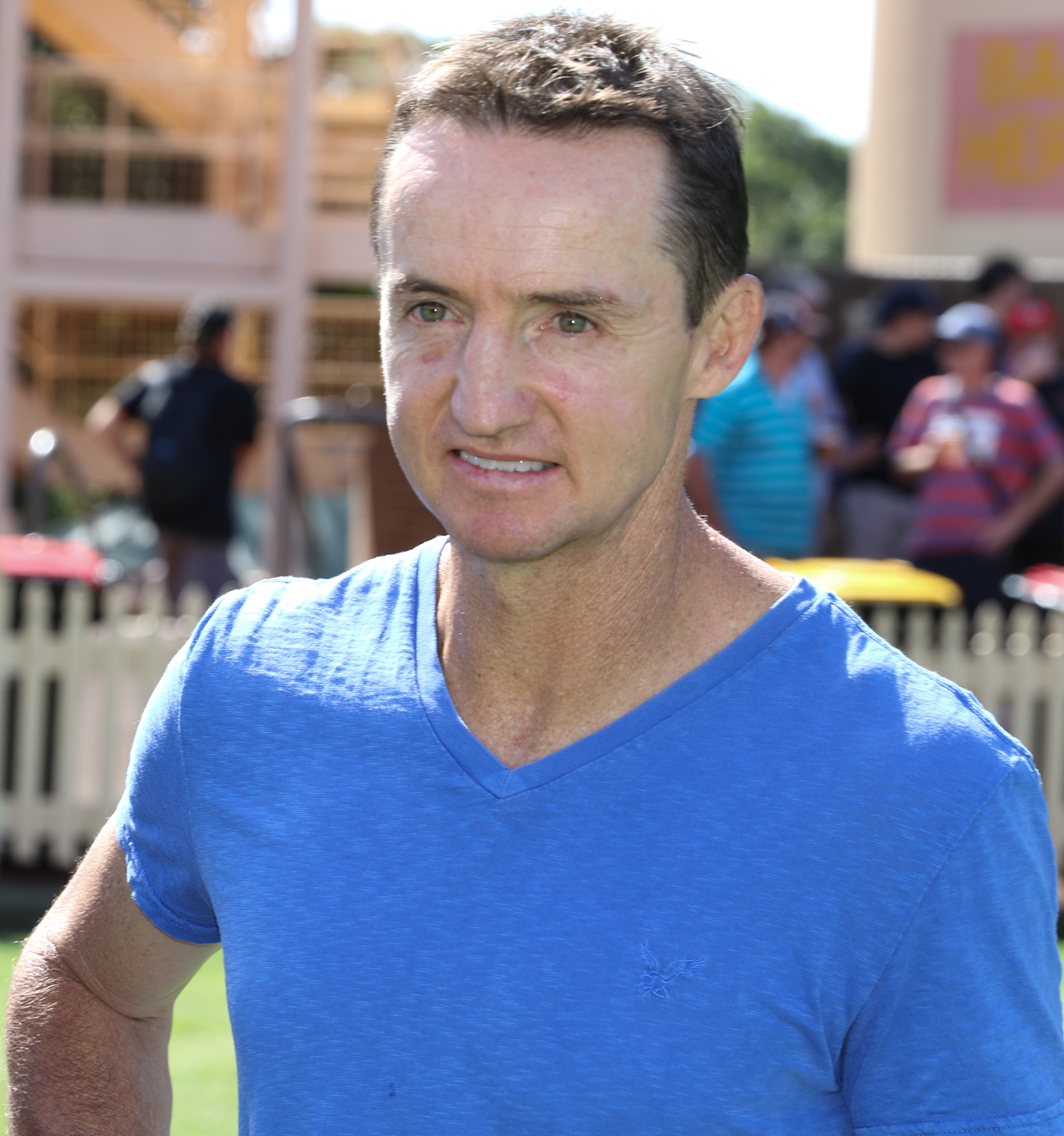
Taylor in 2018

== Coaching career ==
=== Parramatta Eels ===
Previously the assistant coach at the Parramatta Eels, he was appointed as head coach in May 2006 for the remainder of the season after Brian Smith left the club following the announcement of his sacking for season 2007. When Taylor took over as Parramatta coach, the club had only won 2 of its first 8 games. Taylor then guided Parramatta on a 9-game winning streak as the club finished in 8th place on the table and qualified for the finals. Parramatta were eliminated in the first week of the finals losing to minor premiers Melbourne 12–6.

=== South Sydney Rabbitohs ===
It was already planned that from 2007 Taylor was to join the South Sydney Rabbitohs as an assistant coach. In August 2006, it was announced he would replace Shaun McRae as head coach of the struggling South Sydney club. In his first year at Souths he took them to a top eight finish qualifying them for the finals. It was the first time since 1989 that Souths reached the finals.

On 17 September 2009 it was announced that Taylor had been sacked as coach by the club due to an altercation with second-rower David Fa'alogo during end-of-season celebrations. A visibly upset Taylor appeared on the NRL Footy Show later that evening and on a number of sport programs on Sydney radio in the following days to explain his conduct and subsequent dismay at his sacking.

=== Sydney Roosters roles ===
In 2011, Taylor returned to coaching with the Sydney Roosters Toyota Cup (Under-20s) team. His team made the semis in both 2011 and 2012.

With the sacking of Brian Smith at the end of 2012, Taylor was appointed assistant coach to new first grade coach Trent Robinson for the 2013 season.

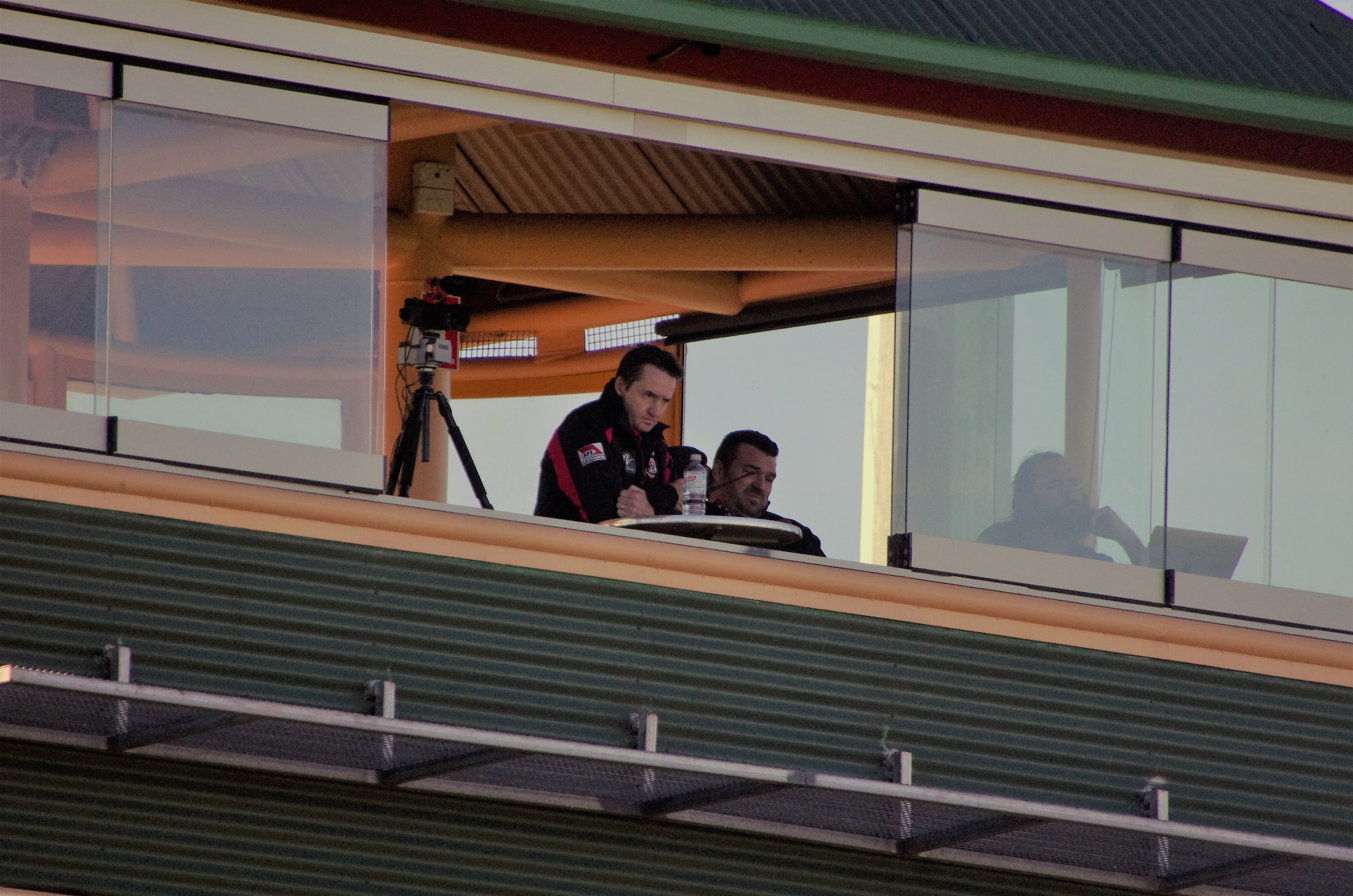
Taylor as head coach of the North Sydney Bears in 2021

=== Wests Tigers ===
On 29 September 2014 Taylor was announced as the head coach of the Wests Tigers for the next three seasons, starting from 2015.

On 20 March 2017 Taylor was sacked as Wests Tigers coach. After being terminated by Wests Tigers, it was revealed that Taylor was relieved of his duties partly due to poor results on the field but also for the fact that what the media had described as "The Big 4" at the club would not sign new contracts if Taylor was still the coach going forwards into the future. Taylor's time at Wests was also marred by an ugly feud with long time player Robbie Farah and resulted in Farah being demoted to reserve grade and then subsequently leaving the club altogether.

=== Return to Roosters staff ===
On 8 May 2017, the Sydney Roosters confirmed that Jason Taylor will be on-boarded as an assistant coach. Roosters coach, Trent Robinson, quickly clarified that Taylor would be an assistant to the coach. On 5 September 2018, Taylor was announced as the new head coach of his former club the North Sydney Bears. In Taylor's first year in charge at Norths, he guided the club to a third-placed finish at the end of the 2019 Canterbury Cup NSW regular season as they qualified for the finals for the first time since 2017. North Sydney would go on to be eliminated from the 2019 Canterbury Cup NSW finals series as they lost both matches against South Sydney and Newtown. After both of the 2020 and 2021 NSW Cup seasons were cancelled due to the COVID-19 pandemic, Taylor guided North Sydney to third on the table in the 2022 season. North Sydney would go on to lose both finals matches against Penrith and Canterbury. In the 2023 NSW Cup season, Taylor guided North Sydney to the Minor Premiership and later the grand final where they would play against South Sydney. North Sydney lead the match with five minutes remaining before Souths scored a late try to win 22-18. On 28 September, Taylor signed a two-year deal to become the new assistant coach at Canterbury.

Sporting positions
Preceded by Daryl Halligan; 2000	Record-holder; Most points in an NRL career 2001 (2,035) – 2006 (2,107)	Succeeded by Andrew Johns; 2006
