= Luke Patten =

Australian rugby league footballer

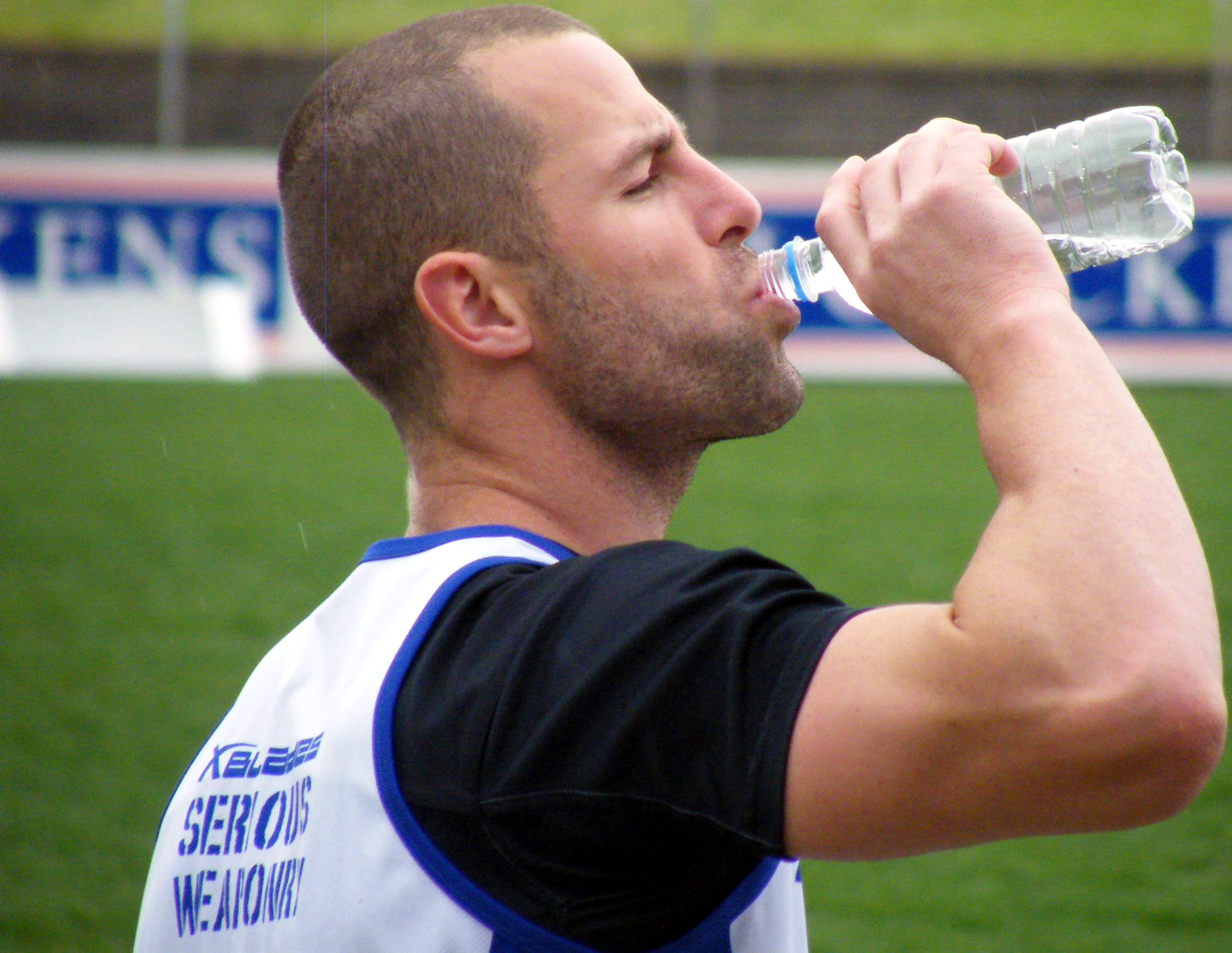

Personal information
- Born: 9 January 1980 (age 46) Bulli, New South Wales, Australia

Playing information
- Height: 188 cm (6 ft 2 in)
- Weight: 87 kg (13 st 10 lb)
- Position: Fullback
Club
Years	Team	Pld	T	G	FG	P
1998	Illawarra Steelers	13	5	0	0	20
1999–00	St. George Illawarra	44	13	0	0	52
2001–10	Canterbury Bulldogs	225	82	0	0	328
2011–12	Salford City Reds	56	16	0	0	64
	Total	338	116	0	0	464
Representative
Years	Team	Pld	T	G	FG	P
2002–09	NSW Country	3	2	0	0	8

Luke "The General" Patten (born 9 January 1980) is a former professional rugby league footballer and NRL match official. A Junior Kangaroo and Country New South Wales representative fullback he played for the Illawarra Steelers, St George Illawarra Dragons and the Canterbury-Bankstown Bulldogs in Australia and the Salford City Reds in the Super League. Patten won the 2004 NRL Premiership with the Bulldogs.

Patten played in the famous 1999 Grand Final between the St. George Illawarra Dragons and the Melbourne Storm played in front of a record crowd of 108,000 people at the Homebush Olympic Stadium.

In 2001, he joined the Canterbury-Bankstown Bulldogs and quickly made the fullback position his own. In 2004 he played in every game of the Canterbury-Bankstown premiership winning season which finished with a 16–13 victory Grand Final win over the Sydney Roosters.

A two-time winner of the clubs best and fairest in 2006 & 2007, Patten became the club's heart and soul. A back injury ended his 2008 campaign but he returned in 2009 to help a rejuvenated club reach the preliminary final against the Parramatta Eels. Unfortunately he copped a head knock early in the game in a huge blow to the Bulldogs hopes.

At the end of the 2010 NRL season he signed a 3-year deal to join the Salford City Reds in the English Super League. In his last season for the club (2012) he was voted the clubs best and fairest.

Upon returning to Australia in 2013 he joined the NRL match officials as a video referee. In all he officiated in over 400 first class games before leaving the role.

In 2015 he was voted as fullback, in the team of the decade (2000-2010) for the Canterbury-Bankstown Bulldogs.

In 2020 he accepted a role with the NRL Match Review Committee.

== Background ==
Patten was born in Bulli, New South Wales, Australia of English descent.

== Playing career ==
An Illawarra junior, Patten acquired the nickname "General" because of his surname's similarity to that of General Patton.

Patten made his first grade debut for Illawarra in round 3 of the 1998 NRL season against Newcastle at WIN Stadium. Patten played in Illawarra's final game as a stand-alone entity when they played against Canterbury-Bankstown in round 24 1998 at WIN Stadium. Patten scored two tries in a 25–24 loss. At the end of 1998, Illawarra formed a joint-venture partnership with St. George to become St. George Illawarra.

He played for St. George Illawarra at fullback in the 1999 NRL Grand Final loss to the Melbourne Storm. He moved to the Canterbury-Bankstown Bulldogs in 2001.

Patten played at fullback for Canterbury in their 2004 NRL grand final victory over cross-city rivals, the Sydney Roosters. As 2004 NRL premiers, Canterbury faced Super League IX champions, Leeds in the 2005 World Club Challenge. Patten played at fullback and scored a try in Canterbury's 32–39 loss.

Patten was selected for Country in the City vs Country Origin match on 8 May 2009. In 2009, Patten was 19th man for the New South Wales Blues in Game 3.

On 27 July 2010 it was confirmed that Patten would be moving to the Super League, linking up with English club Salford City Reds for 3 years from the 2011 season.

Patten and Trent Barrett were the joint last remaining former Illawarra Steelers players to play in the NRL.

=== Career highlights ===
- Junior Club: Corrimal Cougars
- First grade debut: Round 3, 1998 – Illawarra v Newcastle Knights, WIN Stadium.
- NSW Game 3, 18th Man – 2009.
- 100th First Grade Try, 30th July 2010..

=== Awards ===
- Canterbury Player of the Year – 2006.
- Canterbury Player of the Year – 2007.

== Refereeing career ==
Patten first showed interest in becoming a referee in 2011. In 2013 he became the first ex-player from the NRL era to officiate in a first grade grand final when he served as video referee for the 2013 NRL Grand Final.
