= Northern Eagles =

Defunct Australian rugby league club, based in Northern Sydney, NSW and Gosford, NSW

Club information
- Full name: Northern Eagles Rugby League Football Club
- Colours: Maroon, Black, Red, White
- Founded: 2000; 26 years ago
- Exited: 2002; 24 years ago

Former details
- Competition: National Rugby League
- 2002: 9th of 15
- Team colours

Records
- Most capped: 69 – Steve Menzies
- Highest points scorer: 279 – Ben Walker

The Northern Eagles were a rugby league team that competed in the National Rugby League (NRL) between 2000 and 2002. The club was formed during the rationalisation process of the NRL by forming a joint venture with the North Sydney Bears and the Manly Warringah Sea Eagles in 2000. The team shared home games between Brookvale Oval and Central Coast Stadium, Gosford, New South Wales.

Little success was had during three seasons (2000–2002), finishing 12th, 10th, and 9th, winning 30 of 76 games. Also, the new club's decision to play games in Gosford instead of the Bears home ground at North Sydney Oval alienated many North Sydney fans, despite North Sydney's planned move to the new Central Coast Stadium, which had been rebuilt for the Bears on the site of the old Grahame Park ground. In spite of this, the club provided more players for the 2001 State of Origin series' New South Wales team than any other club.

The partnership folded in 2002, with Manly emerging as the standalone entity as the licence reverted to them. That year's season was played under the Northern Eagles name, although effectively the club was the Manly Warringah Sea Eagles by another name due to Manly managing all affairs and pocketing all of the money offered by the NRL as an incentive to form joint ventures. Thus the North Sydney Bears only participated in the joint-venture for the 2000 and 2001 seasons and the Bears had no affiliation or shareholding in the Northern Eagles during the 2002 season. Halfway through the season, the Eagles even abandoned playing games at Gosford, due to a sharp decline in attendances. The people of Gosford preferred to wait until a home-grown team was based there. The Manly Warringah Sea Eagles name and colours returned to the NRL in 2003.

North Sydney now field a team in the NSW Cup, the competition immediately below NRL level, as a feeder club to the Melbourne Storm. They previously had feeder deals with both the South Sydney Rabbitohs and the Sydney Roosters.

== Home grounds ==
The Northern Eagles shared their home games between Brookvale Oval in Sydney and Grahame Park in Gosford. The record attendance for the club was 20,059 for the club's opening game against the Newcastle Knights at Grahame Park on 6 February 2000. The record attendance for the club at Brookvale Oval was 14,521 against Cronulla on 21 July 2002.

== Emblem and colours ==
Northern Eagles – Logos

2000

2001–2002

The colours of the Northern Eagles derived from both teams being maroon and white from Manly Warringah, and red and black of North Sydney. In the logo, the use of gold was to provide a point of difference and to appeal to both former teams. For the 2002 season, during which the Northern Eagles franchise was entirely owned by Manly-Warringah after the withdrawal from the joint-venture by North Sydney, the team removed the North Sydney colours of red and black from the playing kit, and played in the traditional maroon and white of Manly, with the addition of royal blue trim.

== Players ==
A total of sixty nine players played for the club. Steve Menzies played the most games for the club, with 69 caps.

=== State of Origin ===
==== New South Wales ====
- (New South Wales) Geoff Toovey (2000)
- (New South Wales) Adam Muir (2000–01)
- (New South Wales) Steve Menzies (2001–02)
- (New South Wales) Brett Kimmorley (2001)

=== City Vs Country origin ===
==== NSW City ====
- (New South Wales) Steve Menzies (2001)

==== NSW Country ====
- (New South Wales) Brett Kimmorley (2001)

== Records ==
=== Club records ===
Biggest win

- 28 points, 30–2 against Cronulla-Sutherland Sharks at Brookvale Oval on 18 March 2000

Biggest loss

- 58 points, 10–68 against New Zealand Warriors at Ericsson Stadium on 14 April 2002

Most consecutive wins

- 2 matches, 21–26 February 2000
- 2 matches, 23–29 April 2000
- 2 matches, 25 June – 2 July 2000
- 2 matches, 22–28 April 2001
- 2 matches, 23–29 June 2002
- 2 matches, 4–11 August 2002

Most consecutive losses

- 4 matches, 25 March – 15 April 2000
- 4 matches, 9–30 July 2000
- 4 matches, 25 August 2001 – 30 March 2002

Most points in a season

- Ben Walker – 279 (18 tries, 103 goals, 1 field goal) in 2001

Record attendance

- 20,059 vs Newcastle Knights at NorthPower Stadium, 6 February 2000
- 14,521 vs Cronulla-Sutherland Sharks at Brookvale Oval, 21 July 2002

== Post 2003 ==
Since the Northern Eagles folded at the end of 2002, Manly and North Sydney have gone their separate ways.

Manly officially returned to the NRL in 2003 (playing out of Brookvale Oval, though they played at least two games per season in Gosford until 2015) and have since played in four NRL Grand Finals (2007, 2008, 2011 and 2013), winning the premiership in 2008 and 2011.

North Sydney began playing in the NSW Cup (formerly known as Reserve Grade) at their traditional base, North Sydney Oval, where they are a feeder team to the Melbourne Storm. Before this, Norths were the feeder team for the Sydney Roosters from 2019 to 2023, and the South Sydney Rabbitohs from 2007 to 2018. As of 2014, there have been several attempts for the Bears to come back into the NRL by being based at the Central Coast, North Sydney, Perth, Gold Coast and Brisbane. Former North Sydney internationals Greg Florimo and David Fairleigh play a prominent role in the club's push to join the NRL. The Bears have an affiliation with the Perth Bears that will enter the National Rugby League in 2027.

== See also ==
- Central Coast Bears
