= Tuimavave =

Tuimavave is a surname. Notable people with the surname include:

- Carlos Tuimavave (born 1992), Samoan rugby league player
- Evarn Tuimavave (born 1984), New Zealand rugby league player
- Paddy Tuimavave, Samoan rugby league player
- Paki Tuimavave, Samoan rugby league player
- Tony Tuimavave (born 1969), Samoan rugby league player
