= 2000 NRL season =

Rugby league competition

2000 National Rugby League
- Duration: 5 February – 27 August 2000
- Teams: 14
- Premiers: Brisbane (5th title)
- Minor premiers: Brisbane (5th title)
- Matches played: 191
- Points scored: 8,050
- Average attendance: 15,494
- Total attendance: 2,959,390
- Top points scorer: Joel Caine (224)
- Wooden spoon: North Queensland (3rd spoon)
- Dally M Medal: Trent Barrett
- Top try-scorer: Nathan Blacklock (25)

The 2000 NRL season was the 93rd season of professional rugby league football in Australia and the third to be run by the National Rugby League. Fourteen teams competed from February until August for the NRL Premiership, culminating in the 2000 NRL Grand Final between the Brisbane Broncos and the Sydney Roosters.

== Season summary ==
The 2000 National Rugby League season started with a new CEO in rugby union's David Moffett who replaced Neil Whittaker in late 1999.

The season began in early February to accommodate the Sydney 2000 Olympic Games which were to be held during September and required the use of Stadium Australia, the grand final venue. The grand final was scheduled for late August, the first grand final in that month since 1963. The capacity of Stadium Australia for the grand final was limited due to preparations for the Opening Ceremony of the Olympic Games, which would take place just nineteen days later.

Throughout the month of February, mandatory breaks in play at the 20th and 60th minute of the game were implemented to allow players to rehydrate themselves. Due to concerns over the summer heat, the Brisbane and North Queensland clubs played their first four games away from home.

The Cowboys were stripped of two competition points after it was later revealed that they unwittingly used a fourteenth player for three minutes in their 26–18 win against the Parramatta Eels, due to an error in interchanging players.

Melbourne Storm players Stephen Kearney and Marcus Bai ended the career of Wests Tigers captain Jarrod McCracken with a spear tackle. Kearney was suspended for eight matches and Bai for two matches. The two men were also sued by McCraken, who won a six-figure damages bill.

The Canberra Raiders and the Wests Tigers became the first teams to play a premiership game in the snow. It occurred at Bruce Stadium on 28 May and it is the only premiership game played in these conditions.

=== Teams ===
The season saw the debut of the Wests Tigers (formed by the merging of the Balmain Tigers and Western Suburbs Magpies) and Northern Eagles (formed by the merging of the Manly-Warringah Sea Eagles and North Sydney Bears) in the National Rugby League. In addition, the South Sydney Rabbitohs were excluded from the competition, thereby completing the NRL's rationalisation process from 20 teams in 1998 to 14 in 2000.

For the 2000 season, the Canterbury-Bankstown Bulldogs changed their name again, this time to the geographically indistinct "Bulldogs" and the Auckland Warriors were re-branded the New Zealand Warriors at the end of the season.

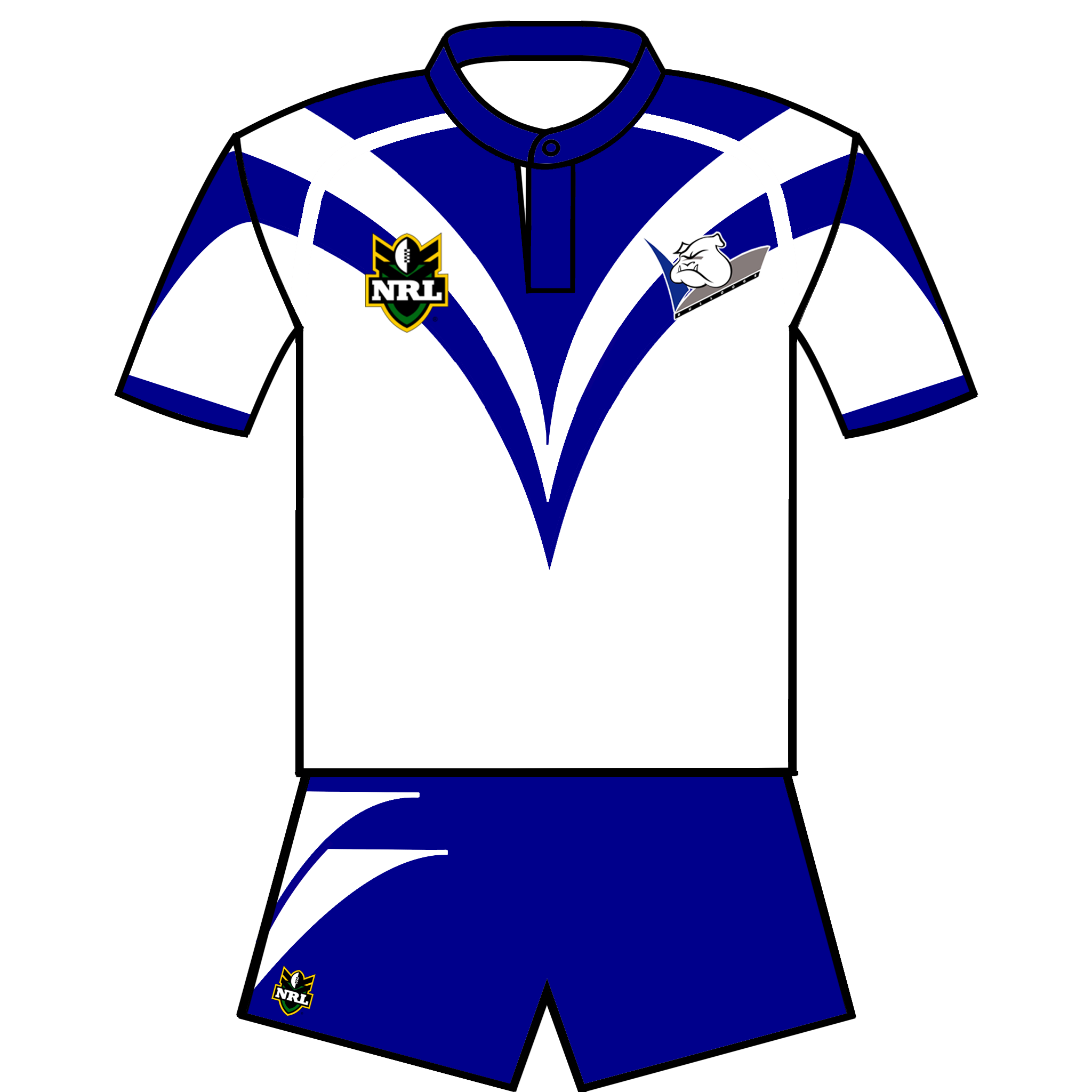
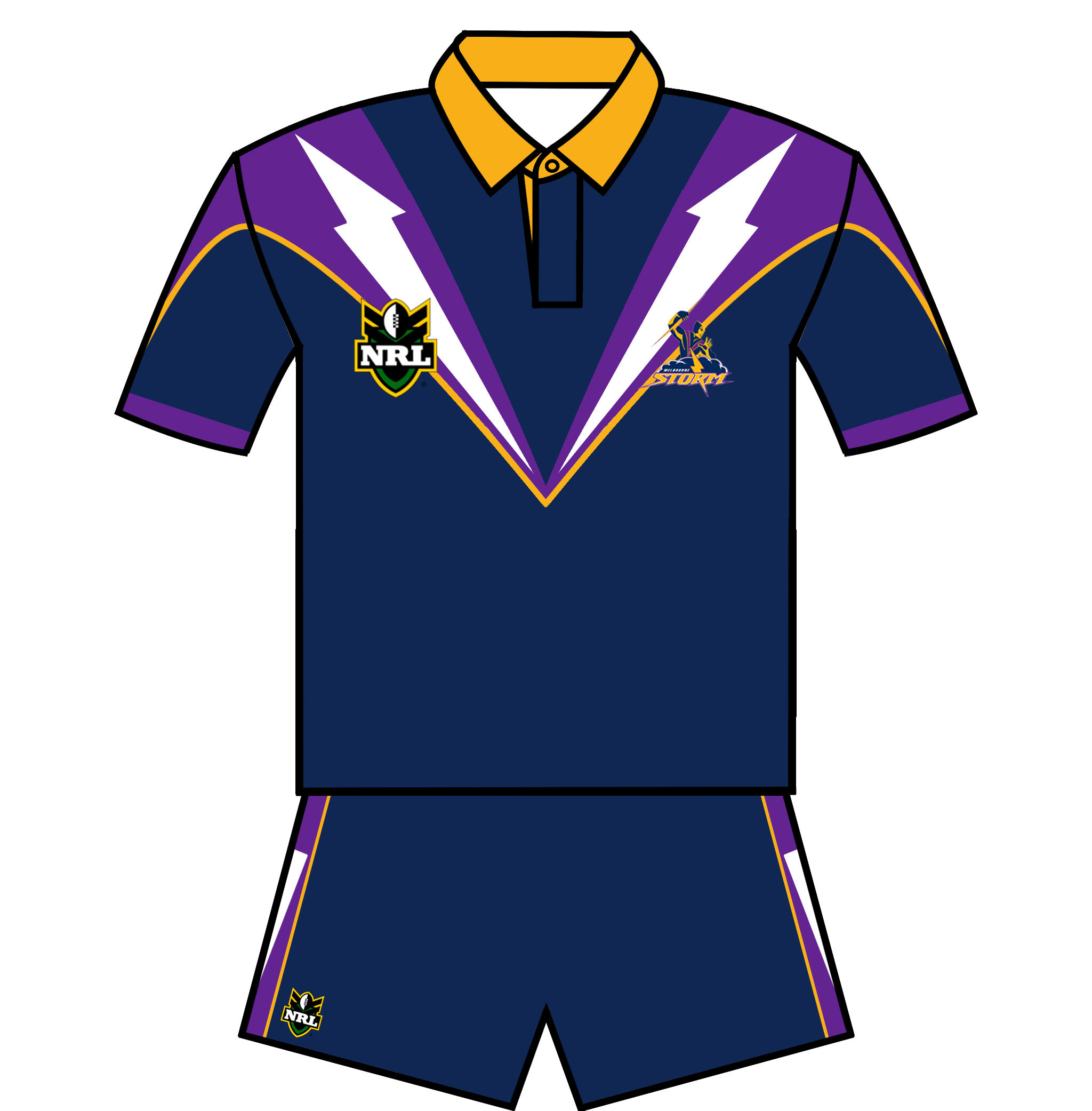
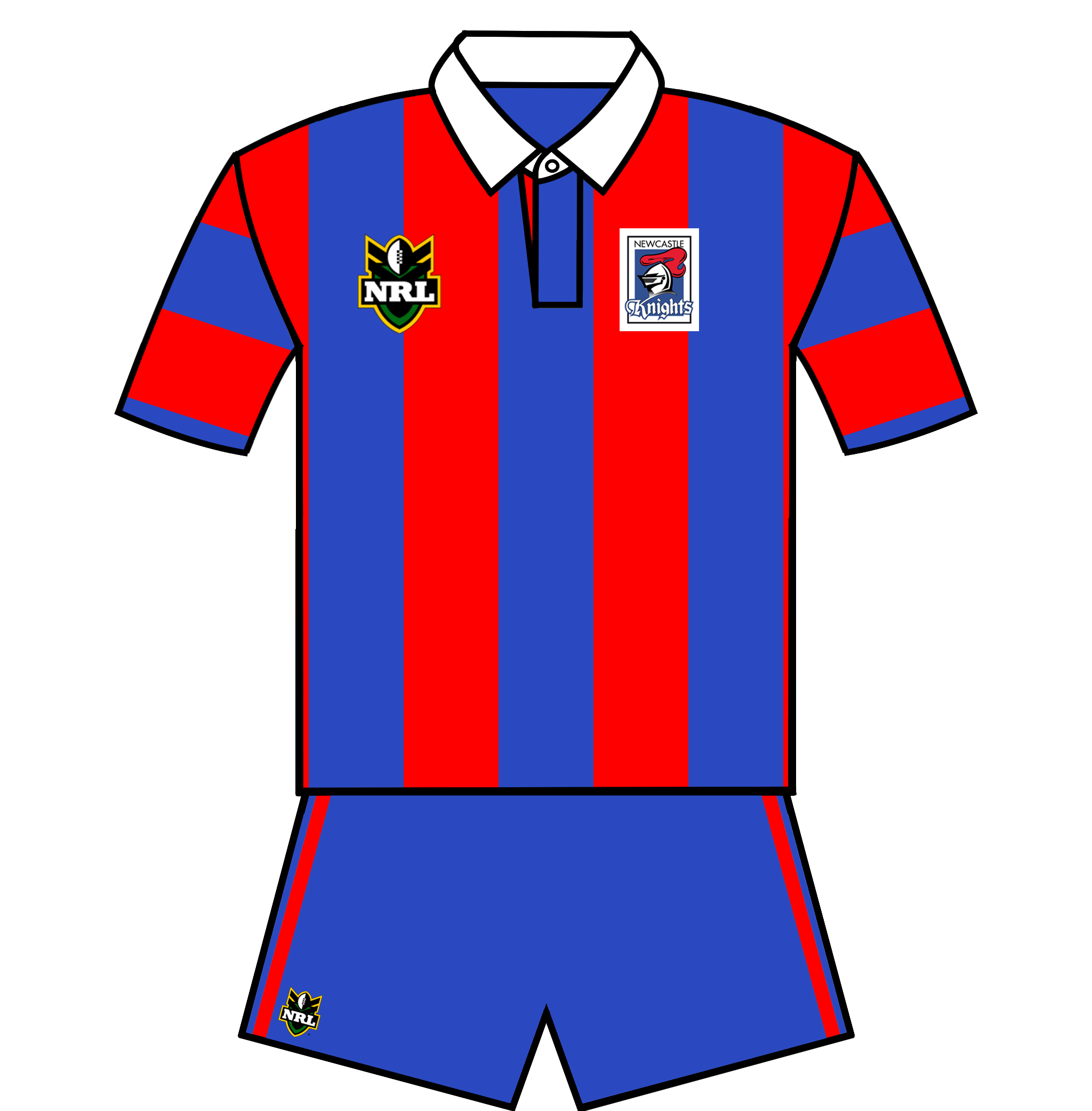
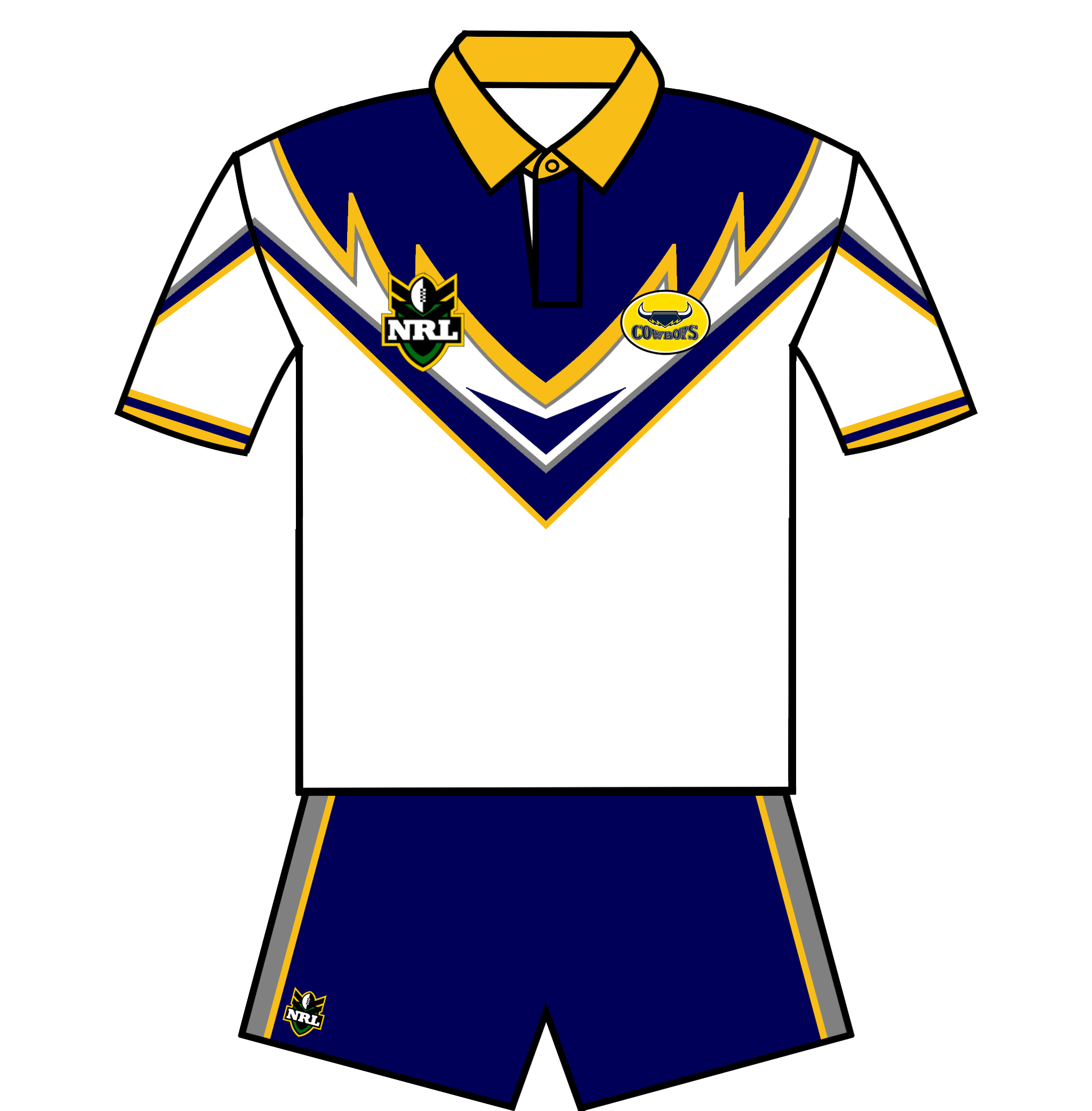
Auckland Warriors; 6th season Ground: Ericsson Stadium; Coach: Mark Graham; Captain: John Simon	Brisbane Broncos; 13th season Ground: ANZ Stadium; Coach: Wayne Bennett; Captain: Kevin Walters	Bulldogs 66th season Ground: Stadium Australia; Coach: Steve Folkes; Captain: Darren Britt	Canberra Raiders; 19th season Ground: Bruce Stadium; Coach: Mal Meninga; Captain: Laurie Daley	Melbourne Storm 3rd season Ground: Olympic Park Stadium & Melbourne Cricket Ground; Coach: Chris Anderson; Captain: Robbie Kearns
Newcastle Knights 13th season Ground: Marathon Stadium; Coach: Warren Ryan; Captain: Tony Butterfield	North Queensland Cowboys 6th season Ground: Dairy Farmers Stadium; Coach: Tim Sheens; Captain: Noel Goldthorpe / Tim Brasher	Northern Eagles; 1st season Ground: Brookvale Oval & NorthPower Stadium; Coach: Peter Sharp; Captain: Geoff Toovey	Parramatta Eels; 54th season Ground: Parramatta Stadium; Coach: Brian Smith; Captain: Nathan Cayless	Penrith Panthers; 34th season Ground: Penrith Stadium; Coach: Royce Simmons; Captain: Steve Carter
Sharks; 34th season Ground: Shark Park; Coach: John Lang; Captain: Andrew Ettingshausen	St. George Illawarra Dragons; 2nd season Ground: WIN Stadium & Sydney Football Stadium; Coach: David Waite & Andrew Farrar; Captain: Craig Smith	Sydney Roosters; 93rd season Ground: Sydney Football Stadium; Coach: Graham Murray; Captain: Brad Fittler	Wests Tigers; 1st season Ground: Campbelltown Stadium & Leichhardt Oval; Coach: Wayne Pearce; Captain: Jarrod McCracken

=== Advertising ===
For the first time since farewelling Tina Turner in 1995 the NRL used a major recording star in its promotional campaign and accessed a media budget that saw the launch ad shown regularly throughout the season. Sydney advertising agency VCD in the last of their four-year tenure on the NRL account shot an ad with Tom Jones performing on stage alongside hi-kicking female dancers, the 1993 Salt-N-Pepa hit Whatta Man with lyrics re-worked as "What A Game".

=== Records and statistics ===
- Martin Lang ran 4,571 metres with the ball in 2000, more than any other player in the competition.
- Melbourne Storm club record for their biggest ever win and most points in a game : 70–10 over St. George Illawarra Dragons in round 5.
- Melbourne Storm club record for their biggest ever loss : 50–4 loss to St. George Illawarra Dragons in round 18.
- St. George Illawarra Dragons club record for their biggest ever win : 54–0 over Auckland Warriors in round 14.
- North Queensland Cowboys scored their first ever 50 points in a game: 50–10 over Northern Eagles in round 8.

=== Ladder ===
2000 NRL season
Pos	Team	Pld	W	D	L	PF	PA	PD	Pts	Qualification
1	Brisbane Broncos (P)	26	18	2	6	696	388	+308	38	Advance to finals series
2	Sydney Roosters	26	16	0	10	601	520	+81	32	Advance to finals series
3	Newcastle Knights	26	15	1	10	686	532	+154	31	Advance to finals series
4	Canberra Raiders	26	15	0	11	506	479	+27	30	Advance to finals series
5	Penrith Panthers	26	15	0	11	573	562	+11	30	Advance to finals series
6	Melbourne Storm	26	14	1	11	672	529	+143	29	Advance to finals series
7	Parramatta Eels	26	14	1	11	476	456	+20	29	Advance to finals series
8	Cronulla-Sutherland Sharks	26	13	0	13	570	463	+107	26	Advance to finals series
9	St George Illawarra Dragons	26	12	0	14	576	656	−80	24	
10	Wests Tigers	26	11	2	13	519	642	−123	24	
11	Canterbury-Bankstown Bulldogs	26	10	1	15	469	553	−84	21	
12	Northern Eagles	26	9	0	17	476	628	−152	18	
13	Auckland Warriors	26	8	2	16	426	662	−236	18	
14	North Queensland Cowboys	26	7	0	19	436	612	−176	12 (Note: North Queensland were stripped of two competition points due to a breach of the interchange rule in round 4.)	

Source: RLP
(P) Premiers

=== Ladder progression ===
- Numbers highlighted in green indicate that the team finished the round inside the top 8.
- Numbers highlighted in blue indicates the team finished first on the ladder in that round.
- Numbers highlighted in red indicates the team finished in last place on the ladder in that round

	Team	1	2	3	4	5	6	7	8	9	10	11	12	13	14	15	16	17	18	19	20	21	22	23	24	25	26
1	Brisbane	1	3	5	7	9	11	13	15	15	16	18	18	20	20	22	22	24	24	26	28	30	32	34	36	38	38
2	Sydney	2	2	4	4	6	6	8	8	10	10	12	14	16	16	16	18	18	20	22	24	26	26	26	28	30	32
3	Newcastle	0	2	4	5	5	7	9	9	9	11	11	13	13	13	15	17	19	21	21	23	23	25	25	27	29	31
4	Canberra	2	4	6	6	8	8	8	10	10	12	12	12	12	14	16	16	18	20	22	24	24	24	26	26	28	30
5	Penrith	2	4	4	6	6	8	8	8	10	10	10	10	10	12	14	16	18	20	22	22	24	24	26	26	28	30
6	Melbourne	0	0	0	0	2	4	6	6	8	9	11	13	15	15	17	18	19	19	19	21	23	25	25	27	27	29
7	Parramatta	0	0	2	2	2	4	4	5	7	9	11	11	11	13	15	15	17	19	21	21	21	23	25	27	27	29
8	Cronulla	2	4	4	4	6	8	8	10	10	10	12	12	12	14	14	16	16	18	20	22	22	22	24	24	26	26
9	St George Illawarra	0	2	2	2	2	2	4	6	8	10	10	12	12	14	14	14	14	16	18	18	20	22	22	22	24	24
10	Wests	1	3	3	5	7	9	9	10	12	14	14	14	16	18	18	20	20	20	20	20	22	24	24	24	24	24
11	Bulldogs	0	0	2	4	6	6	6	6	8	9	11	11	13	15	15	15	17	17	17	17	17	17	19	21	21	21
12	Northern Eagles	2	2	4	6	6	6	8	8	8	8	8	10	12	12	12	12	14	14	14	14	16	18	18	18	18	18
13	Auckland	2	2	2	3	3	3	3	5	5	6	8	10	10	10	12	14	14	14	14	14	14	14	14	16	16	18
14	North Queensland	0	0	0	0	0	0	2	4	4	4	4	6	8	8	8	8	8	8	8	10	10	10	12	12	12	12

== Finals series ==
The biggest upset of the 2000 finals series was in the 3rd qualifying final when 7th placed Parramatta Eels beat 2nd placed Sydney Roosters 32–8 at the SFS. It was nearly a similar story for Minor Premiers' the Brisbane Broncos when they came from 20-6 down at halftime to win 34–20 against 8th placed Cronulla-Sutherland Sharks in the 4th qualifying final at QSAC. The Sydney Roosters also made a famous comeback when they came from 16-2 down at halftime to win 26–20 against the Newcastle Knights in the 1st preliminary final at the SFS to earn a spot in the grand final against Brisbane.

Home	Score	Away	Match information
Home	Score	Away	Date and time	Venue	Referee	Crowd
Qualifying finals
Canberra Raiders	34–16	Penrith Panthers	4 August 2000	Bruce Stadium	Steve Clark	18,479
Newcastle Knights	30–16	Melbourne Storm	5 August 2000	Marathon Stadium	Tim Mander	20,597
Sydney Roosters	8–32	Parramatta Eels	5 August 2000	Sydney Football Stadium	Bill Harrigan	21,377
Brisbane Broncos	34–20	Cronulla-Sutherland Sharks	6 August 2000	ANZ Stadium	Paul Simpkins	25,831
Semi-finals
Parramatta Eels	28–10	Penrith Panthers	12 August 2000	Sydney Football Stadium	Bill Harrigan	25,746
Canberra Raiders	10–38	Sydney Roosters	13 August 2000	Sydney Football Stadium	Tim Mander	16,441
Preliminary finals
Newcastle Knights	20–26	Sydney Roosters	19 August 2000	Sydney Football Stadium	Bill Harrigan	33,727
Brisbane Broncos	16–10	Parramatta Eels	20 August 2000	Stadium Australia	Tim Mander	31,087

=== Chart ===
Qualifying finals
1	Brisbane	34
8	Cronulla	20
2	Sydney	8
7	Parramatta	32
3	Newcastle	30
6	Melbourne	16
4	Canberra	34
5	Penrith	16

Semifinals
4W	Parramatta	28
2L	Penrith	10
3W	Canberra	10
1L	Sydney	38

Preliminary finals
1W	Brisbane	16
Parramatta	10
2W	Newcastle	20
Sydney	26

Final
Brisbane	14
Sydney	6

=== Grand final ===
2000 NRL Grand Final

Sunday, 27 August
15:00 AEDT (UTC+11)

Brisbane Broncos	14 – 6	Sydney Roosters
Tries: 2 Tuqiri 16'; Sailor 54'; Goals: 3 De Vere pen 11', 17', pen 26' (3/5)	1st: 10–2; 2nd: 4–4; Report	Tries: 1 Fitzgibbon 69' Goals: 1 Phillips pen 33' (1/1); Fitzgibbon (0/1)

Stadium Australia, Sydney
Attendance: 94,277
Referee: Bill Harrigan
Touch judges: Steve Lyons, Phil Cooley
Clive Churchill Medal: Darren Lockyer (Brisbane)

== Player statistics ==
The following statistics are as of the conclusion of Round 26.

Top 5 point scorers

Points	Player	Tries	Goals	Field goals
224	Joel Caine	15	82	0
208	Mat Rogers	18	68	0
204	Daryl Halligan	7	88	0
196	Ryan Girdler	12	73	2
186	Michael De Vere	12	69	0

Top 5 try scorers

Tries	Player
25	Nathan Blacklock
18	Timana Tahu
18	Mat Rogers
17	Wendell Sailor
17	Shannon Hegarty

Top 5 goal scorers

Goals	Player
88	Daryl Halligan
82	Joel Caine
78	Tasesa Lavea
77	Andrew Johns
73	Ryan Girdler

== 2000 transfers ==
=== Players ===
Player	1999 club	2000 club
Syd Eru	Auckland Warriors	Retirement
Brady Malam	Auckland Warriors	Super League: Wigan Warriors
Matthew Ridge	Auckland Warriors	Retirement
Tony Tatupu	Auckland Warriors	Super League: Wakefield Trinity Wildcats
John Carlaw	Balmain Tigers	Wests Tigers
Ben Duckworth	Balmain Tigers	Wests Tigers
Shayne Dunley	Balmain Tigers	Wests Tigers
Craig Field	Balmain Tigers	Wests Tigers
Michael Gillett	Balmain Tigers	Wests Tigers
Craig Hancock	Balmain Tigers	Retirement
Solomon Haumono	Balmain Tigers	St. George Illawarra Dragons
Jason Lowrie	Balmain Tigers	Wests Tigers
Laloa Milford	Balmain Tigers	Wests Tigers
Adam Nable	Balmain Tigers	Wests Tigers
Shannon Nevin	Balmain Tigers	Retirement
Mark O'Neill	Balmain Tigers	Wests Tigers
Darren Senter	Balmain Tigers	Wests Tigers
Jacin Sinclair	Balmain Tigers	Retirement
Tyran Smith	Balmain Tigers	Wests Tigers
Adam Starr	Balmain Tigers	Redcliffe Dolphins (Queensland Cup)
Mark Stimson	Balmain Tigers	Wests Tigers
Shane Walker	Balmain Tigers	Wests Tigers
Jason Webber	Balmain Tigers	Super League: Salford City Reds
Andrew Gee	Brisbane Broncos	Super League: Warrington Wolves
Allan Langer	Brisbane Broncos	Super League: Warrington Wolves
John Plath	Brisbane Broncos	Retirement
Steve Renouf	Brisbane Broncos	Super League: Wigan Warriors
Peter Ryan	Brisbane Broncos	ACT Brumbies (Super 12)
Ben Kennedy	Canberra Raiders	Newcastle Knights
Rod Maybon	Canberra Raiders	Retirement
David Westley	Canberra Raiders	Parramatta Eels
Robert Relf	Canterbury-Bankstown Bulldogs	North Queensland Cowboys
Phil Adamson	Manly Warringah Sea Eagles	Retirement
Anthony Colella	Manly Warringah Sea Eagles	Canberra Raiders
Owen Cunningham	Manly Warringah Sea Eagles	Northern Eagles
Damian Driscoll	Manly Warringah Sea Eagles	Northern Eagles
Andrew Frew	Manly Warringah Sea Eagles	Northern Eagles
Daniel Gartner	Manly Warringah Sea Eagles	Northern Eagles
Terry Hill	Manly Warringah Sea Eagles	Wests Tigers
John Hopoate	Manly Warringah Sea Eagles	Wests Tigers
Andrew King	Manly Warringah Sea Eagles	Northern Eagles
Nik Kosef	Manly Warringah Sea Eagles	Northern Eagles
Cliff Lyons	Manly Warringah Sea Eagles	Retirement
Graham Mackay	Manly Warringah Sea Eagles	Super League: Leeds Rhinos
Steve Menzies	Manly Warringah Sea Eagles	Northern Eagles
Adam Peters	Manly Warringah Sea Eagles	Canberra Raiders
Brendon Reeves	Manly Warringah Sea Eagles	Northern Eagles
Jim Serdaris	Manly Warringah Sea Eagles	Retirement
Neil Tierney	Manly Warringah Sea Eagles	Retirement
Geoff Toovey	Manly Warringah Sea Eagles	Northern Eagles
Albert Torrens	Manly Warringah Sea Eagles	Northern Eagles
Paul Bell	Melbourne Storm	Super League: Leeds Rhinos
Glenn Lazarus	Melbourne Storm	Retirement
Tawera Nikau	Melbourne Storm	Super League: Warrington Wolves
Scott Conley	Newcastle Knights	Retirement
Owen Craigie	Newcastle Knights	Wests Tigers
Paul Harragon	Newcastle Knights	Retirement
David Lomax	Newcastle Knights	Super League: Huddersfield-Sheffield Giants
Jason Moodie	Newcastle Knights	Parramatta Eels
Steve Walters	Newcastle Knights	Retirement
Jody Gall	North Queensland Cowboys	Penrith Panthers
John Lomax	North Queensland Cowboys	Melbourne Storm
Glen Murphy	North Queensland Cowboys	Retirement
Noa Nadruku	North Queensland Cowboys	Retirement
Matthew Ryan	North Queensland Cowboys	Retirement
Kris Tassell	North Queensland Cowboys	Super League: Salford City Reds
Michael Buettner	North Sydney Bears	Northern Eagles
Brett Dallas	North Sydney Bears	Super League: Wigan Warriors
David Fairleigh	North Sydney Bears	Newcastle Knights
Jamie Goddard	North Sydney Bears	Northern Eagles
Ben Ikin	North Sydney Bears	Brisbane Broncos
Gary Larson	North Sydney Bears	Parramatta Eels
William Leyshon	North Sydney Bears	Northern Eagles
Billy Moore	North Sydney Bears	Retirement
Glenn Morrison	North Sydney Bears	North Queensland Cowboys
Adam Muir	North Sydney Bears	Northern Eagles
Scott Pethybridge	North Sydney Bears	Auckland Warriors
Nigel Roy	North Sydney Bears	Northern Eagles
Matt Seers	North Sydney Bears	Wests Tigers
Mark Soden	North Sydney Bears	Retirement
Paul Stringer	North Sydney Bears	Northern Eagles
Josh Stuart	North Sydney Bears	Northern Eagles
Anthony Swann	North Sydney Bears	Canberra Raiders
Jason Taylor	North Sydney Bears	Northern Eagles
Steve Trindall	North Sydney Bears	Northern Eagles
Nathan Barnes	Parramatta Eels	Canberra Raiders
Jason Bell	Parramatta Eels	Auckland Warriors
Jarrod McCracken	Parramatta Eels	Wests Tigers
Justin Morgan	Parramatta Eels	Canberra Raiders
Dean Pay	Parramatta Eels	Retirement
Chris Quinn	Parramatta Eels	Retirement
Mark Tookey	Parramatta Eels	Auckland Warriors
Shane Whereat	Parramatta Eels	Retirement
Greg Alexander	Penrith Panthers	Retirement
Tim Brasher	South Sydney Rabbitohs	North Queensland Cowboys
Mark Carroll	South Sydney Rabbitohs	Retirement
Chris Caruana	South Sydney Rabbitohs	N/A
Peter Clarke	South Sydney Rabbitohs	Retirement
Andrew Dunemann	South Sydney Rabbitohs	Super League: Halifax Blue Sox
Sean Garlick	South Sydney Rabbitohs	Retirement
Tony Iro	South Sydney Rabbitohs	Retirement
Justin Loomans	South Sydney Rabbitohs	Central Comets (Queensland Cup)
Paul McNicholas	South Sydney Rabbitohs	Cronulla-Sutherland Sharks
Scott Murray	South Sydney Rabbitohs	Cronulla-Sutherland Sharks
Jason Nicol	South Sydney Rabbitohs	North Queensland Cowboys
Julian O'Neill	South Sydney Rabbitohs	North Queensland Cowboys
Matt Parsons	South Sydney Rabbitohs	Newcastle Knights
Wes Patten	South Sydney Rabbitohs	St. George Illawarra Dragons
Wayne Richards	South Sydney Rabbitohs	Retirement
Brett Rodwell	South Sydney Rabbitohs	Retirement
Ian Rubin	South Sydney Rabbitohs	Sydney Roosters
Jeremy Schloss	South Sydney Rabbitohs	North Queensland Cowboys
James Smith	South Sydney Rabbitohs	Super League: Salford City Reds
Robert Tocco	South Sydney Rabbitohs	Retirement
Darrell Trindall	South Sydney Rabbitohs	Super League: St. Helens
Craig Wing	South Sydney Rabbitohs	Sydney Roosters
Mark Coyne	St. George Illawarra Dragons	Retirement
Craig Fitzgibbon	St. George Illawarra Dragons	Sydney Roosters
Brad Mackay	St. George Illawarra Dragons	Super League: Bradford Bulls
Matthew Rodwell	St. George Illawarra Dragons	Penrith Panthers
Rod Wishart	St. George Illawarra Dragons	Retirement
Graham Appo	Sydney City Roosters	North Queensland Cowboys
David Barnhill	Sydney City Roosters	Super League: Leeds Rhinos
Ivan Cleary	Sydney City Roosters	Auckland Warriors
Justin Dooley	Sydney City Roosters	Super League: London Broncos
Paul Langmack	Sydney City Roosters	Retirement
Andrew Walker	Sydney City Roosters	ACT Brumbies (Super 12)
Adam Bristow	Western Suburbs Magpies	Leigh Centurions (Northern Ford Premiership)
Justin Brooker	Western Suburbs Magpies	Super League: Bradford Bulls
Scott Coxon	Western Suburbs Magpies	Auckland Warriors
Leo Dynevor	Western Suburbs Magpies	Retirement
Darren Fritz	Western Suburbs Magpies	Retirement
Matt Fuller	Western Suburbs Magpies	Retirement
Steve Georgallis	Western Suburbs Magpies	Wests Tigers
Luke Goodwin	Western Suburbs Magpies	N/A
Brett Hodgson	Western Suburbs Magpies	Parramatta Eels
Harvey Howard	Western Suburbs Magpies	Brisbane Broncos
Andrew Leeds	Western Suburbs Magpies	Retirement
Ken McGuinness	Western Suburbs Magpies	Wests Tigers
Kevin McGuinness	Western Suburbs Magpies	Wests Tigers
Ciriaco Mescia	Western Suburbs Magpies	Wests Tigers
John Skandalis	Western Suburbs Magpies	Wests Tigers
Matthew Spence	Western Suburbs Magpies	Auckland Warriors
James Pickering	Super League: Castleford Tigers	Canterbury-Bankstown Bulldogs
Brett Grogan	Super League: Gateshead Thunder	Northern Eagles
Kerrod Walters	Super League: Gateshead Thunder	Brisbane Broncos
Robbie Simpson	Super League: London Broncos	St. George Illawarra Dragons
Des Clark	Super League: St. Helens	North Queensland Cowboys
Shane Kenward	Super League: Wakefield Trinity Wildcats	North Queensland Cowboys
Bruce Mamando	Sydney City Roosters	North Queensland Cowboys

=== Coaches ===
Coach	1999 club	2000 club
Wayne Pearce	Balmain Tigers	Wests Tigers
Peter Sharp	Manly-Warringah Sea Eagles	Northern Eagles
Graham Murray	Super League: Leeds Rhinos	Sydney Roosters
