= 1994 Pacific Cup =

Rugby tournament

- Number of teams: 10
- Host country: Fiji
- Winner: Tonga (1st title)
- Matches played: 24

The 1994 Pacific Cup was the seventh staging of the Pacific Cup. It is a rugby league tournament held between Pacific teams. The tournament was hosted by Fiji and eventually won by Tonga, who defeated the hosts 34 - 11 in the final.

== Squads ==
Before the tournament began both Papua New Guinea and Tokelau pulled out due to lack of funds.

- The New Zealand Māori squad was coached by John Solomon and included Blair Harding, Alex Chan, Tane Manihera, Leroy Joe, Mark Woods and Darren Rameka.
- Tonga were coached by Graham Mattson and included Jim Dymock, John Hopoate, Albert Fulivai, Willie Wolfgramm, Franklin Fonua, Greg Wolfgramm and Matt Roiall, .
- Western Samoa squad: Rudy David, Henry Suluvale, Gafa Tuiloma, Mike Setefano, Junior Fiu, Mark Faumuina, Lani Latoa, Alex Tupou, Sefo Fuimaono, Humphrey Amiatu, Se'e Solomona, James Goulding, Steve Atoa, Earl Va'a, Ola Loau, Roy Tusa , Vae Afoa, Joe Vagana, Tony Tatupu, Des Maea, Mathew Tuisamoa, Paki Tuimavave, Tony Tuimavave, Vincent Winterstein
- Richie Barnett, Whetu Taewa, Logan Edwards, Jason Palmada, Willie Poching, Tony Tatupu and Tevita Vaikona were all unavailable for the tournament.

== Results ==
=== Pool A ===
	Team	Pld	W	D	L	Pts
1	Australian Aborigines	4	4	0	0	8
2	Tonga	4	3	0	1	6
3	Māori	4	2	0	2	4
4	Niue	4	1	0	3	2
5	Fijian Presidents XIII	4	0	0	4	0

29 October 1994

Australian Aborigines	64 – 10	Niue

Suva

29 October 1994

Māori	28 – 16	Presidents XIII
Tries: Mansson (2), Manihera (2), Rameka; Goals: Howell (3), Mansson

Suva

31 October 1994

Tonga	28 – 8	Māori
Tries: Taufa, Fonua, Wolfgramm, Amone, Tulikaki, Hopoate; Goals: Amone (2)		Tries: Tuhaka, Woods

Suva

31 October 1994

Australian Aborigines	50 – 12	Presidents XIII

Suva

2 November 1994

Māori	24 – 22	Niue
Tries: Walker (2), Morrison, Tuhaka, Aoake; Goals: Morrison (2)		Tries: Fafuti (2), Edward, Mafi; Goals: Siataga (3)

Suva

2 November 1994

Tonga	32 – 10	Presidents XIII

Suva

5 November 1994

Australian Aborigines	34 – 16	Tonga
Tries: Edward (2), Fisner, Young, P. Davis, B. Davis; Goals: Trindall (3), B. Davis, Edward		Tries: Tapueluelu, Leilua, Fulivai; Goals: Amone (2)

Suva

5 November 1994

Niue	30 – 8	Presidents XIII
Tries: Edward (3), Noue (2), Lilo, Mafi; Goals: Lilo		Tries: Matirewa; Goals: Taga, Kuansau

Suva

7 November 1994

Tonga	58 – 12	Niue

Suva

7 November 1994

Australian Aborigines	38 – 20	Māori
Tries: Edward (4), Sanders (2); Goals: Trindall (7)		Tries: Brewer, Milner, Manihera, Hemana; Goals: Howell (2)

Suva

=== Group B ===
	Team	Pld	W	D	L	Pts
1	Western Samoa	4	4	0	0	8
2	Fiji	4	3	0	1	6
3	Rotuma	4	1	1	2	3
4	Cook Islands	4	1	0	3	2
5	American Samoa	4	0	1	4	1

30 October 1994

Rotuma	17 – 10	Cook Islands

Suva

30 October 1994

Western Samoa	16 – 14	Fiji

Suva

1 November 1994

Western Samoa	30 – 10	American Samoa

Suva

1 November 1994

Fiji	19 – 11	Cook Islands

Suva

3 November 1994

Cook Islands	22 – 20	American Samoa

Suva

3 November 1994

Fiji	32 – 12	Rotuma

Suva

5 November 1994

Western Samoa	50 – 14	Rotuma
Tries: Setefano (3), Va'a (2), Tuisamoa (2), Fuimaono, Winterstein; Goals: Va'a (7)		Tries: Johnson, Wongchiu, Abraham; Goals: Abraham

Suva

5 November 1994

Fiji	16 – 14	American Samoa
Tries: Toga, Ravono, Delana, Dikidikilati		Tries: Papalii, Stewart, Mafoe; Goals: Pollard

Suva

7 November 1994

Rotuma	32 – 32	American Samoa

Suva

7 November 1994

Western Samoa	60 – 0	Cook Islands

Suva

=== Finals ===
Semifinals
1	Australian Aborigines	20
2	Fiji	21
1	Western Samoa	16
2	Tonga	34

Finals
Fiji	11
Tonga	34
Third place
Australian Aborigines	22
Western Samoa	29

==== Semi-finals ====
9 November 1994

Fiji	21 – 20	Australian Aborigines
Tries: Nayacakalou, Vatubua, Sagaitu; Goals: Nayacakalou (4); Drop goals: Taga		Tries: B. Davis, Trindall, Kennedy, Gagai; Goals: Trindall (2)

Suva

9 November 1994

Tonga	34 – 16	Western Samoa
Tries: Hopoate (4), Fulivai, Taufa; Goals: Amone (5)		Tries: Tuiloma (2), Setefano; Goals: Va'a (2)

Suva

==== Third place playoff ====
11 November 1994

Western Samoa	29 – 22	Australian Aborigines
Tries: Keresome (3), Maea, Tusa; Goals: Maea (3), Va'a; Drop goals: Tusa		Tries: Nona, R. Smith, Gagai, M. Smith; Goals: Allende (2), Trindall

Suva

==== Final ====
12 November 1994

Tonga	34 – 11	Fiji
Tries: Fulivai (2), Amone (2), Hopoate, Pinefeuaki, Pupu; Goals: Amone (2), Firth		Tries: Delana, Nayacakalou; Goals: Nayacakalou; Drop goals: Senikuraciri

Suva
