= 2000 Brisbane Broncos season =

Coordinates: 27.558333°S 153.062222°E

- 2000 NRL premiers
- NRL rank: 1st
- Play-off result: Won Grand Final (Sydney Roosters, 14–6)
- 2000 record: Wins: 21; draws: 2; losses: 6

Team information
- CEO: Shane Edwards
- Head coach: Wayne Bennett
- Captain: Kevin Walters
- Stadium: ANZ Stadium
- Avg. attendance: 26,706
- High attendance: 29,849 (Melbourne Storm, 7 April)

Top scorers
- Tries: Wendell Sailor (18); Lote Tuqiri (18)
- Goals: Michael De Vere (74)
- Points: Michael De Vere (196)
← 1999	List of seasons	2001 →

The 2000 Brisbane Broncos season was the thirteenth in the club's history. Coached by Wayne Bennett and captained by Kevin Walters, they competed in the NRL's 2000 Telstra Premiership, finishing the regular season 1st (out of 14 teams) to claim their 4th minor premiership before going on to win the 2000 NRL Grand final, their fifth title in nine years.

== Season summary ==
Brisbane spent the entire 2000 NRL season from round four in first position on the ladder. The Broncos started the season with an unbeaten run of 8 matches before going down to the Penrith Panthers in round 9. The Broncos were the first team to play the newly formed Wests Tigers (Merged team of Balmain Tigers and Western Suburbs Magpies) with both teams sharing the points with a 24-24 draw.

The Broncos went on a Win–loss run for 8 rounds before winning 7 of their last 8 regular season matches to finish Minor Premiers. Also the Broncos suffered their worst collapse in the club history when they led 22-4 at halftime to lose 26-22 against the Newcastle Knights in round 18.

The Qualifying Final was a different story when the Broncos came from 20-6 down at halftime to win 34-20 against the 8th-placed Cronulla Sharks. The Broncos had a week off to prepare for the Parramatta Eels in the Preliminary Final which the Broncos won 16-10 to go into a Grand Final against the Sydney Roosters. From the 10th minute, the Broncos led all the way when Michael De Vere landed a penalty goal to give the Broncos a 2-0 lead, erasing a 0 deficit in round 26 against Sydney when Sydney beat Brisbane 28-0. Broncos led at halftime 10-2 at halftime to go out winners 14-6 to clinch their 5th premiership in 9 years.

== Match results ==
Round	Opponent	Result	Bro.	Opp.	Date	Venue	Crowd	Position
1	Wests Tigers	Draw	24	24	6 Feb	Campbelltown Stadium	15,376	8/14
2	Parramatta Eels	Win	18	10	11 Feb	ANZ Stadium	15,366	4/14
3	Auckland Warriors	Win	28	10	20 Feb	Ericsson Stadium	17,505	2/14
4	Cronulla Sharks	Win	18	14	26 Feb	Toyota Park	15,969	1/14
5	Newcastle Knights	Win	20	14	4 Mar	ANZ Stadium	27,146	1/14
6	North Queensland Cowboys	Win	50	8	11 Mar	Dairy Farmers Stadium	27,643	1/14
7	Canberra Raiders	Win	14	6	17 Mar	ANZ Stadium	27,506	1/14
8	Canterbury Bulldogs	Win	24	14	26 Mar	ANZ Stadium	21,815	1/14
9	Penrith Panthers	Loss	2	18	31 Mar	Penrith Stadium	15,290	1/14
10	Melbourne Storm	Draw	18	18	7 Apr	ANZ Stadium	29,849	1/14
11	St George Illawarra Dragons	Win	34	18	16 Apr	ANZ Stadium	22,190	1/14
12	Northern Eagles	Loss	6	16	23 Apr	Brookvale Oval	10,781	1/14
13	Parramatta Eels	Win	28	6	28 Apr	Parramatta Stadium	20,208	1/14
14	Canberra Raiders	Loss	14	16	8 May	Canberra Stadium	12,552	1/14
15*	Sydney Roosters	Win	40	14	14 May	ANZ Stadium	15,577	1/14
16	Melbourne Storm	Loss	12	16	21 May	Olympic Park Stadium	14,054	1/14
17*	Cronulla Sharks	Win	32	4	26 May	ANZ Stadium	19,665	1/14
18	Newcastle Knights	Loss	22	26	4 Jun	Marathon Stadium	21,512	1/14
19*	North Queensland Cowboys	Win	26	16	10 Jun	ANZ Stadium	10,455	1/14
20	Wests Tigers	Win	56	12	18 Jun	ANZ Stadium	19,953	1/14
21	Canterbury Bulldogs	Win	48	18	24 Jun	Stadium Australia	12,214	1/14
22	Penrith Panthers	Win	48	6	2 Jul	ANZ Stadium	24,912	1/14
23	Northern Eagles	Win	32	22	9 Jul	ANZ Stadium	19,282	1/14
24	St George Illawarra Dragons	Win	44	14	16 Jul	WIN Stadium	14,184	1/14
25	Auckland Warriors	Win	38	20	22 Jul	ANZ Stadium	17,545	1/14
26	Sydney Roosters	Loss	0	28	28 Jul	Sydney Football Stadium	22,613	1/14
Qualif. Final	Cronulla Sharks	Win	34	20	6 Aug	ANZ Stadium	25,831	
Prelim. Final	Parramatta Eels	Win	16	10	20 Aug	Stadium Australia	31,087	
GRAND FINAL	Sydney Roosters	Win	14	6	27 Aug	Stadium Australia	94,277	

- Game following a State of Origin match

== Ladder ==
2000 NRL season
Pos	Team	Pld	W	D	L	PF	PA	PD	Pts
1	Brisbane Broncos (P)	26	18	2	6	696	388	+308	38
2	Sydney Roosters	26	16	0	10	601	520	+81	32
3	Newcastle Knights	26	15	1	10	686	532	+154	31
4	Canberra Raiders	26	15	0	11	506	479	+27	30
5	Penrith Panthers	26	15	0	11	573	562	+11	30
6	Melbourne Storm	26	14	1	11	672	529	+143	29
7	Parramatta Eels	26	14	1	11	476	456	+20	29
8	Cronulla-Sutherland Sharks	26	13	0	13	570	463	+107	26
9	St George Illawarra Dragons	26	12	0	14	576	656	−80	24
10	Wests Tigers	26	11	2	13	519	642	−123	24
11	Canterbury-Bankstown Bulldogs	26	10	1	15	469	553	−84	21
12	Northern Eagles	26	9	0	17	476	628	−152	18
13	Auckland Warriors	26	8	2	16	426	662	−236	18
14	North Queensland Cowboys	26	7	0	19	436	612	−176	12 (Note: North Queensland were stripped of 2 competition points due to a breach of the interchange rule in Round 4.)

(P) Premiers

== Grand final ==
Broncos	Position	Roosters
Darren Lockyer	1 Fullback	Luke Phillips
Lote Tuqiri	2 Wing	Matt Sing
Tonie Carroll	3 Centre	Shannon Hegarty
Michael De Vere	4 Centre	Ryan Cross
Wendell Sailor	5 Wing	Anthony Minichiello
Ben Ikin	6 Five-eighth	Brad Fittler (C)
Kevin Walters (C)	7 Halfback	Adrian Lam
Shane Webcke	8 Prop	Ian Rubin
Luke Priddis	9 Hooker	Simon Bonetti
Dane Carlaw	10 Prop	Peter Cusack
Gorden Tallis	11 Second Row	Bryan Fletcher
Brad Thorn	12 Second Row	Craig Fitzgibbon
Kevin Campion	13 Lock	Luke Ricketson
Harvey Howard	Interchange	Dallas Hood
Michael Hancock	Interchange	David Solomona
Shaun Berrigan	Interchange	Shane Rigon
Ashley Harrison	Interchange	Craig Wing
Wayne Bennett	COACH	Graham Murray

Team	Points	Team
Brisbane Broncos	14 - 6	Sydney Roosters
TRIES: Tuqiri, Sailor; GOALS: De Vere 3/5	14 - 6	TRIES: Fitzgibbon; GOALS: Phillips 1/1, Fitzgibbon 0/1

- Halftime: Brisbane 10-2
- Referee: Bill Harrigan
- Stadium: Stadium Australia
- Crowd: 94,277
- Clive Churchill Medal: Darren Lockyer (Brisbane)

== Statistics ==
Player	Tries	Goals	FG	Points
Michael De Vere	12	74/102	0	196
Lote Tuqiri	18	1/2	0	74
Wendell Sailor	18	0	0	72
Ben Walker	1	30/38	0	64
Darren Lockyer	11	5/6	0	54
Luke Priddis	9	0	0	36
Gorden Tallis	9	0	0	36
Brad Thorn	9	0	0	36
Ben Ikin	7	2/5	0	32
Tonie Carroll	7	0	0	28
Ashley Harrison	7	0	0	28
Shaun Berrigan	4	0	0	16
Chris Walker	4	0	0	16
Kevin Walters	4	0	0	16
Dane Carlaw	3	0	0	12
Petero Civoniceva	2	0	0	8
Kevin Campion	2	0	0	8
Justin Hodges	2	0	0	8
Danny Bampton	1	0	0	4
Michael Hancock	1	0	0	4
Brad Meyers	1	0	0	4
Shane Webcke	1	0	0	4
Shane Walker	1	0	0	4

== Honours ==
=== League ===
- NRL Premiership

=== Club ===
- Player of the year: Wendell Sailor
- Rookie of the year: Dane Carlaw
- Back of the year: Wendell Sailor
- Forward of the year: Brad Thorn
- Club man of the year: Michael Hancock
