= Veikoso =

Veikoso is a surname. Notable people with the surname include:

- George Veikoso (1970–2025), Fijiian-Hawaiian musician, vocalist, songwriter, producer, and actor
- Jimmy Veikoso, Tongan rugby league footballer
- Viliame Veikoso (born 1982), Fijian rugby union footballer
