= Carlos Tuimavave =

Samoa international rugby league footballer

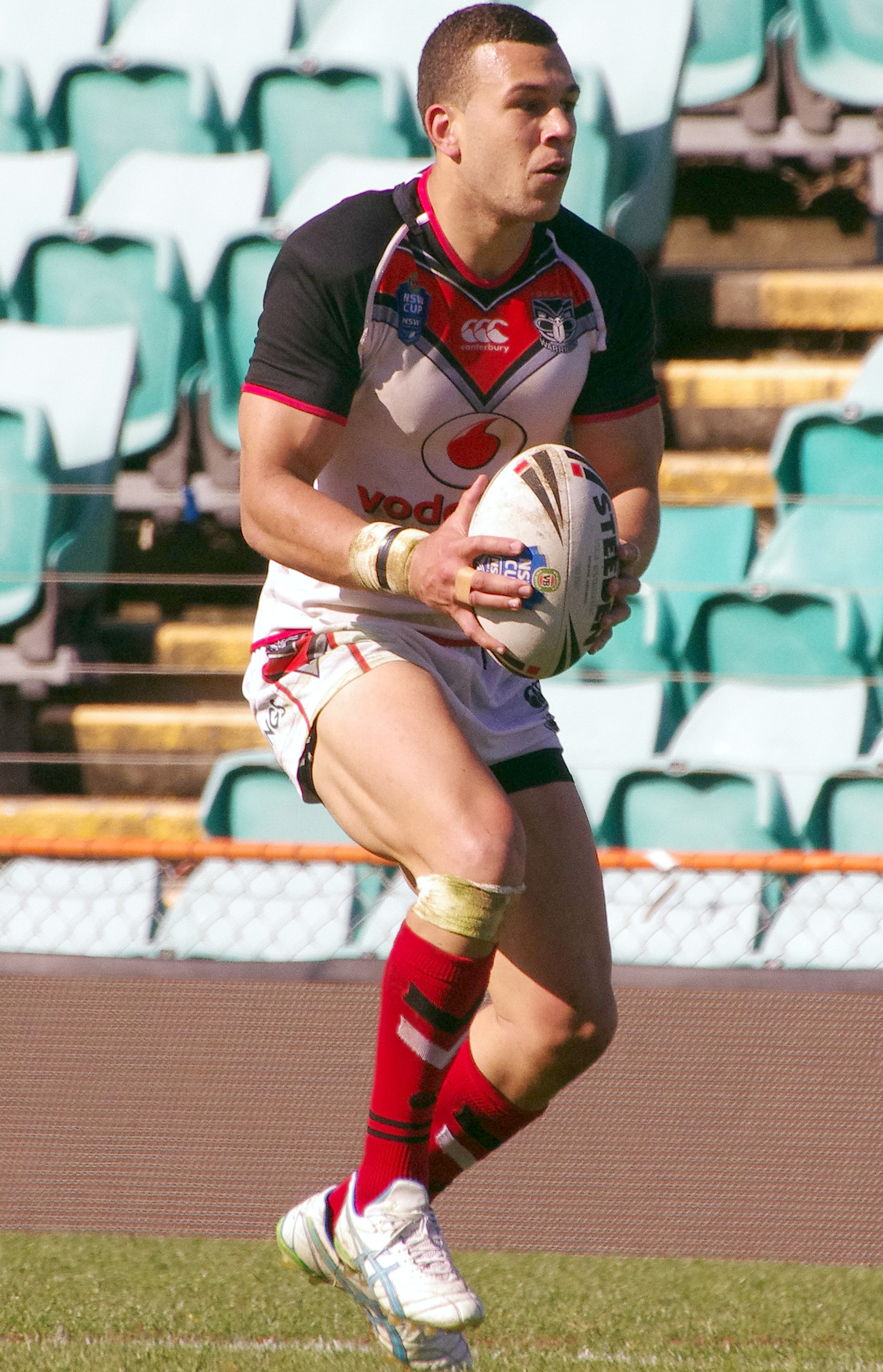

Personal information
- Full name: Carlos Chanel Courtney Tuimavave
- Born: 10 January 1992 (age 34) Auckland, New Zealand
- Height: 6 ft 1 in (1.85 m)
- Weight: 14 st 11 lb (94 kg)

Playing information
- Position: Centre, Stand-off
Club
Years	Team	Pld	T	G	FG	P
2012–14	New Zealand Warriors	9	2	0	0	8
2015	Newcastle Knights	5	1	0	0	4
2016–24	Hull F.C.	182	58	0	0	232
2025	Featherstone Rovers	5	2	0	0	8
	Total	201	63	0	0	252
Representative
Years	Team	Pld	T	G	FG	P
2013–15	Samoa	3	1	0	0	4
- Source: As of 15 November 2026
- Education: Sacred Heart College, Auckland
- Relatives: Evarn Tuimavave (cousin); Antonio Winterstein (cousin); Tony Tuimavave (uncle); Paddy Tuimavave (uncle); Mike Setefano (step-father)

Carlos Tuimavave (born 10 January 1992) is a former Samoa international rugby league footballer who last played as a centre or stand-off for Featherstone Rovers in the RFL Championship.

He previously played for Hull FC in the Super League, captaining the side in the 2023 season, and the New Zealand Warriors and the Newcastle Knights in the NRL.

== Background ==
Tuimavave was born in Auckland, New Zealand, and is of Samoan and European descent.

He played his junior football for the Mount Wellington Warriors while attending St. Patricks Catholic School and Sacred Heart College, both in east Auckland.

Tuimavave is a first cousin of former New Zealand Warriors, Newcastle Knights and Hull Kingston Rovers player, Evarn Tuimavave, Adam Tuimavave- Gerrard who also played New Zealand Warriors and, Antonio Winterstein who played for Brisbane Broncos and The Cowboys. Tuimavave and cousins mentioned above are nephew’s of former New Zealand and Samoan internationals, Tony Tuimavave and Paddy Tuimavave. Mike Setefano a known player in the league scene is Carlos Tuimavave’s step father. Setefano played for the Auckland City Vulcans in the 1994 Lion Red Cup, and toured New Zealand with Western Samoa in 1994. In 1995 he joined the North Harbour Sea Eagles, and was part of the team that won the 1995 Lion Red Cup. He was part of the Western Samoa 1992 Pacific Cup, and 1996 Pacific Challenge sides.

== Playing career ==
=== Early career ===
When he was 16, Tuimavave moved to Sydney, Australia after being signed by the Canterbury-Bankstown Bulldogs. Becoming homesick, he was offered the chance to join the New Zealand Warriors NYC squad in 2010.

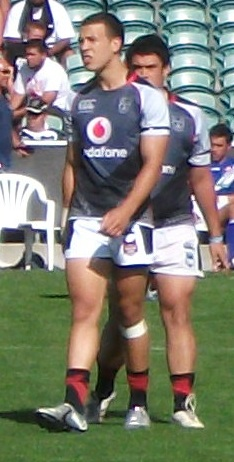
Tuimavave playing for the Junior Warriors in 2011

From 2010 to 2012, he played for the Warriors' NYC team, playing in both the Warriors' 2010 and 2011 Grand Final victories. Forming a halves partnership with Shaun Johnson, Tuimavave was named the Man of the Match in the 2010 Grand Final and also won the Warriors' Young NYC Player of the Year award. In October 2010, he played for the Junior Kiwis against the Junior Kangaroos. On 30 August 2011, he was named at five-eighth in the 2011 NYC Team of the Year. On 16 October 2011, he captained the Junior Kiwis. In 2012, he became the club's sixth player to appear in 50 NYC matches.

=== 2012 ===
In Round 22 of the 2012 NRL season, Tuimavave made his NRL debut for the Warriors against the Cronulla-Sutherland Sharks, becoming the 177th player to play for the Warriors. He came on the field after 20 minutes filling in for the injured five-eighth, James Maloney. On 21 August 2012, he was named at five-eighth in the 2012 NYC Team of the Year. On 13 October 2012, he played for the Junior Kiwis against the Junior Kangaroos for the third time. At the end of 2012, he was named one of the top ten young players of 2012 in an article by Lifestyle Uncut.

=== 2013 ===
In 2013, Tuimavave elected to play for Samoa at senior level and made his international debut in their Pacific Rugby League International clash against Tonga in Penrith.

=== 2014 ===
In May 2014, Tuimavave played for Samoa in the 2014 Pacific Rugby League International. He scored a try in Samoa's 32-16 test-match win. In June 2014, he signed a 2-year contract with the Newcastle Knights starting in 2015. On 8 September 2014, he was named in the Samoa train-on squad for the 2014 Four Nations, but didn't make the final 24-man squad.

=== 2015 ===
On 2 May, Tuimavave played for Samoa against Tonga in the 2015 Polynesian Cup. In Round 12 of the 2015 NRL season, he made his Knights debut against his former club, the New Zealand Warriors. On 25 July, it was confirmed that Tuimavave would be heading off to play in England next season for Super League side Hull F.C. On 27 September, he played in the Knights' 2015 New South Wales Cup Grand Final win over the Wyong Roos.

=== 2016 ===
Tuimavave was given the number 3 shirt for the Hull F.C. side in the 2016 season. He began his Hull FC career in a 60-20 friendly win over Hull Kingston Rovers.

On 27 August, he would go on to make history as he played in the Challenge Cup Final for Hull F.C. against Warrington Wolves. Hull, having never won at Wembley Stadium in 8 attempts had to come back from 10-0 down with 20 minutes to go to win the game 12-10, giving him his first major trophy and going down in the history books as part of the first Hull team to win at Wembley.

=== 2017 ===
On 26 August 2017, Tuimavave won the Challenge Cup for a second year in a row in Hull's 18-14 win over the Wigan Warriors at Wembley Stadium.

=== 2018 ===
Tuimavave played 18 games in the 2018 Super League season as Hull F.C. finished sixth on the table.

=== 2019 ===
Tuimavave played 23 games for Hull F.C. in the 2019 Super League season as the club finished sixth and missed the playoffs.

=== 2020 ===
Tuimavave played 17 games for Hull F.C. in the 2020 Super League season as the club got to within one game of the grand final. At the end of the 2020 season, Tuimavave won Hull FC's Player of the Year award, as well as scooping the Try of the Season for his effort against St Helens in Round 3.

=== 2021 ===
Tuimavave played 20 games for Hull F.C. and scored nine tries in the 2021 Super League season which saw the club finish 8th on the table and miss out on the playoffs.

=== 2022 ===
Tuimavave played a total of eight games for Hull F.C. in the 2022 Super League season which saw the club finish 9th on the table.

=== 2023 ===
Tuimavave played a total of 16 games for Hull F.C. for in the Super League XXVIII season as the club finished 10th on the table.

=== 2024 ===
During the 2024 Super League season, Tuimavave announced it would be his last with Hull F.C. He played a total of 15 games for the club as they finished second last on the table.

On 16 November 2024, it was reported that he had signed for Featherstone in the RFL Championship on a two-year deal.

=== 2026 ===
On 13 April 2026 he announced his retirement as a professional

== Statistics ==
Year	Team	Games	Tries	Pts
2012	New Zealand Warriors	5	1	4
2013	New Zealand Warriors	3	-	-
2014	New Zealand Warriors	1	1	4
2015	Newcastle Knights	5	1	4
2016	Hull FC	25	7	28
2017	Hull FC	28	15	60
2018	Hull FC	25	5	20
2019	Hull FC	24	5	20
2020	Hull FC	19	8	32
2021	Hull FC	20	9	36
2022	Hull FC	8	2	8
2023	Hull FC	18	5	20
2024	Hull FC	12	1	4
2025	Featherstone Rovers	5	3	12
	Totals	201	63	256

== Honours ==
=== Newcastle Knights ===
- New South Wales Cup: (1) 2015

=== Hull FC ===
- Challenge Cup: (2) 2016, 2017
