= 2000 St. George Illawarra Dragons season =

- NRL rank: 9th
- 2000 record: Wins: 12; draws: 0; losses: 14
- Points scored: For: 576; against: 656

Team information
- Coach: David Waite & Andrew Farrar
- Captain: Nathan Brown
- Stadium: Sydney Football Stadium, Wollongong Showground
- Avg. attendance: 14,922
- High attendance: 62,255 (vs. Cronulla, round 1)

Top scorers
- Tries: Nathan Blacklock (25)
- Goals: Wayne Bartrim (50)
- Points: Nathan Blacklock (124)
← 1999	2001 →

The 2000 St. George Illawarra Dragons season was the second in the joint venture club's history. The Dragons competed in the NRL's 2000 premiership season. The team finished ninth in the regular season, missing out on finals for the first time in their history.

== Squad gains and losses ==
▲ or ▼	Player	1999 Club	2000 Club	Source
▲	Jamie Fitzgerald	North Sydney Bears	St. George Illawarra Dragons	
▲	Solomon Haumono	Balmain Tigers	St. George Illawarra Dragons	
▲	Lee Hookey	South Sydney Rabbitohs	St. George Illawarra Dragons	
▲	Wes Patten	South Sydney Rabbitohs	St. George Illawarra Dragons	
▲	Robbie Simpson	London Broncos (Super League)	St. George Illawarra Dragons	
▼	Craig Fitzgibbon	St. George Illawarra Dragons	Sydney Roosters	
▼	Brad Mackay	St. George Illawarra Dragons	Bradford Bulls (Super League)	
▼	Matthew Rodwell	St. George Illawarra Dragons	Penrith Panthers	
▼	Warren Carney	St. George Illawarra Dragons	Wests Tigers	
▼	Mark Coyne	St. George Illawarra Dragons	Retirement	
▼	Paul McGregor	St. George Illawarra Dragons	Retirement	
▼	Rod Wishart	St. George Illawarra Dragons	Retirement	

== Ladder ==
2000 NRL season
Pos	Team	Pld	W	D	L	PF	PA	PD	Pts
1	Brisbane Broncos (P)	26	18	2	6	696	388	+308	38
2	Sydney Roosters	26	16	0	10	601	520	+81	32
3	Newcastle Knights	26	15	1	10	686	532	+154	31
4	Canberra Raiders	26	15	0	11	506	479	+27	30
5	Penrith Panthers	26	15	0	11	573	562	+11	30
6	Melbourne Storm	26	14	1	11	672	529	+143	29
7	Parramatta Eels	26	14	1	11	476	456	+20	29
8	Cronulla-Sutherland Sharks	26	13	0	13	570	463	+107	26
9	St George Illawarra Dragons	26	12	0	14	576	656	−80	24
10	Wests Tigers	26	11	2	13	519	642	−123	24
11	Canterbury-Bankstown Bulldogs	26	10	1	15	469	553	−84	21
12	Northern Eagles	26	9	0	17	476	628	−152	18
13	Auckland Warriors	26	8	2	16	426	662	−236	18
14	North Queensland Cowboys	26	7	0	19	436	612	−176	12 (Note: North Queensland were stripped of 2 competition points due to a breach of the interchange rule in Round 4.)

(P) Premiers

=== Ladder progression ===
Round	1	2	3	4	5	6	7	8	9	10	11	12	13	14	15	16	17	18	19	20	21	22	23	24	25	26
Ladder Position	14th	9th	12th	12th	13th	13th	12th	11th	11th	8th	11th	8th	10th	8th	11th	11th	11th	11th	10th	10th	10th	10th	10th	10th	9th	9th

== Season results ==
Round	Home	Score	Away	Match Information
Round	Home	Score	Away	Date	Venue	Referee	Attendance	Source
1	St. George Illawarra Dragons	12 – 28	Cronulla-Sutherland Sharks	5 February	Stadium Australia	Tim Mander	62,255
2	St. George Illawarra Dragons	12 – 6	North Queensland Cowboys	12 February	Wollongong Showground	Matt Hewitt	6,024
3	St. George Illawarra Dragons	14 – 16	Canterbury-Bankstown Bulldogs	18 February	Sydney Football Stadium	Sean Hampstead	16,163
4	Northern Eagles	20 – 21	St. George Illawarra Dragons	26 February	Central Coast Stadium	Tim Mander	19,092
5	Melbourne Storm	70 – 10	St. George Illawarra Dragons	3 March	Melbourne Cricket Ground	Bill Harrigan	23,239
6	St. George Illawarra Dragons	9 – 15	Wests Tigers	12 March	Wollongong Showground	Paul Simpkins	12,021
7	Auckland Warriors	8 – 36	St. George Illawarra Dragons	18 March	Mount Smart Stadium	Mark Oaten	11,129
8	Newcastle Knights	18 – 25	St. George Illawarra Dragons	24 March	Newcastle International Sports Centre	Sean Hampstead	12,842
9	St. George Illawarra Dragons	24 – 18	Canberra Raiders	2 April	Sydney Football Stadium	Sean Hampstead	9,812
10	St. George Illawarra Dragons	24 – 20	Sydney Roosters	9 April	Wollongong Showground	Steve Clark	13,221
11	Brisbane Broncos	34 – 18	St. George Illawarra Dragons	16 April	Queensland Sport and Athletics Centre	Tim Mander	22,190
12	St. George Illawarra Dragons	28 – 20	Penrith Panthers	22 April	Sydney Football Stadium	Sean Hampstead	8,949
13	North Queensland Cowboys	50 – 4	St. George Illawarra Dragons	29 April	Willows Sports Complex	Mark Oaten	13,768
14	St. George Illawarra Dragons	54 – 0	Auckland Warriors	6 May	Wollongong Showground	Tim Mander	7,039
15	Parramatta Eels	30 – 24	St. George Illawarra Dragons	14 May	Parramatta Stadium	Bill Harrigan	14,135
16	Sydney Roosters	32 – 24	St. George Illawarra Dragons	20 May	Sydney Football Stadium	Sean Hampstead	13,285
17	St. George Illawarra Dragons	12 – 22	Northern Eagles	28 May	Sydney Football Stadium	Mark Oaten	7,693
18	St. George Illawarra Dragons	50 – 4	Melbourne Storm	4 June	Wollongong Showground	Paul Simpkins	10,141
19	Wests Tigers	24 – 36	St. George Illawarra Dragons	9 June	Campbelltown Stadium	Tim Mander	15,263
20	Cronulla-Sutherland Sharks	10 – 40	St. George Illawarra Dragons	18 June	Endeavour Field	Steve Clark	19,507
21	St. George Illawarra Dragons	36 – 24	Newcastle Knights	25 June	Sydney Football Stadium	Bill Harrigan	13,270
22	Canberra Raiders	20 – 30	St. George Illawarra Dragons	1 July	Canberra Stadium	Steve Clark	14,171
23	Penrith Panthers	42 – 12	St. George Illawarra Dragons	8 July	Penrith Stadium	Bill Harrigan	19,330
24	St. George Illawarra Dragons	14 – 44	Brisbane Broncos	16 July	Wollongong Showground	Mark Oaten	14,184
25	Canterbury-Bankstown Bulldogs	10 – 28	St. George Illawarra Dragons	23 July	Stadium Australia	Steve Clark	21,609
26	St. George Illawarra Dragons	24 – 32	Parramatta Eels	29 July	Sydney Football Stadium	Tim Mander	13,317
