= Andrew Ryan (rugby league) =

Australia international rugby league footballer

Andrew "Bobcat" Ryan
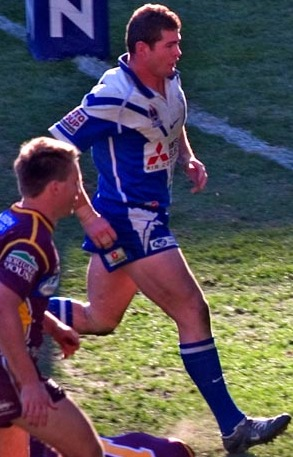

Personal information
- Full name: Andrew Ryan
- Born: 2 December 1978 (age 47) Dubbo, New South Wales, Australia

Playing information
- Height: 186 cm (6 ft 1 in)
- Weight: 105 kg (16 st 7 lb)
- Position: Second-row, Lock
Club
Years	Team	Pld	T	G	FG	P
2000–02	Parramatta Eels	73	16	0	0	64
2003–11	Canterbury Bulldogs	218	52	1	0	210
	Total	291	68	1	0	274
Representative
Years	Team	Pld	T	G	FG	P
2001–07	New South Wales	12	0	0	0	0
2002–09	NSW Country	6	1	0	0	4
2003–07	Australia	11	0	0	0	0

Coaching information
Club
Years	Team	Gms	W	D	L	W%
2022–	NSW Blues U19s	0	0	0	0

Andrew Ryan (born 2 December 1978, Dubbo, New South Wales) is an Australian former professional rugby league footballer who played in the 2000s and 2010s. An Australian international and New South Wales State of Origin representative forward, he played his club football in the National Rugby League for the Parramatta Eels and Canterbury-Bankstown Bulldogs, winning the 2004 NRL premiership with the club and becoming their captain.

== Playing career ==
Of Irish descent, A Dubbo High School, St. Johns Dubbo and Emu Plains JRLFC junior, Ryan made his debut for the Parramatta Eels against the Brisbane Broncos at Parramatta Stadium in round 2 of the 2000 NRL season. Ryan played in the club's preliminary final defeat against the Brisbane Broncos in the same year.

He was named the 2000 Parramatta Eels season's rookie of the year. In the 2001 NRL season, Ryan made 24 appearances as Parramatta finished as runaway Minor Premiers after one of the most dominant seasons in the modern era where the club set numerous point scoring records.

Ryan played from the interchange bench for Parramatta in their shock 2001 NRL grand final loss to the Newcastle Knights. After three seasons with the Parramatta Eels, the club was unable to retain Ryan due to the salary cap and the man known as 'Bobcat' accepted a deal to join arch-rivals the Canterbury-Bankstown for the 2003 NRL season.

His second season with Canterbury-Bankstown was personally and professionally his most successful – with a return to State of Origin, selection at international level, and a premiership win in the 2004 NRL grand final for Canterbury over cross-town rivals, the Sydney Roosters. Ryan pulled off a try saving tackle on the full-time siren during the match on Sydney Roosters player Michael Crocker which won Canterbury the game. Ryan also captained the Canterbury side in this match with regular captain Steve Price ruled out after sustaining an injury in the preliminary final against the 2003 premiers, the Penrith Panthers.

Ryan was selected in the Australian team to go and compete in the end of season 2004 Rugby League Tri-Nations tournament. In the final against Great Britain he played at second-row forward in the Kangaroos' 44–4 victory.

In 2005, Ryan became captain of the club following Price's move to the New Zealand Warriors. Ryan was selected to play for the Australian national team at lock forward the 2007 ANZAC Test match victory against New Zealand. In 2009, he was named Dally M Captain of the Year, after leading the club to within one game of a Grand Final appearance, after they had finished the year prior with the wooden spoon.

He was the last 2004 premiership-winning player still at the club when he retired at the conclusion of the 2011 NRL season.

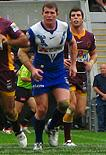
Bobcat Ryan in action against the Broncos

== Post-playing career ==
Ryan is now an ambassador and player welfare officer for the National Rugby League.

Ryan is also an Australian Apprenticeships Ambassador for the Australian Government.

Ryan works as a Group Training Field Officer for Novaskill, a not for profit organisation.

== Representative selection ==
Ryan was selected to represent New South Wales as variously a second-rower or lock in five series to the end of 2007:

- Games II and III of the 2001 State of Origin series
- Games I and II of the 2004 State of Origin series
- Games I, II and III of the 2005 State of Origin series
- Games I and II of the 2006 State of Origin series
- Games I, II and III of the 2007 State of Origin series
- He was selected at Lock for the 2008 City V Country match at WIN stadium.

Ryan was also a mainstay of the Australian Kangaroos, appearing in three Tri-Nations series in 2004, 2005 and 2006 as well as a Test against France in 2005. He was selected for Country in the City vs Country match on 8 May 2009.
