= 2000 Parramatta Eels season =

- NRL Rank: 7th
- Play-off result: Preliminary Finalists (Lost 10–16 vs Brisbane Broncos, 2nd Preliminary Final)
- World Club Challenge: DNQ
- 2000 record: Wins: 14; draws: 1; losses: 11
- Points scored: For: 476; against: 456

Team information
- CEO: Denis Fitzgerald
- Coach: (Australia) Brian Smith
- Captain: (New Zealand) Nathan Cayless
- Stadium: Parramatta Stadium (Capacity: 20,741)

Top scorers
- Tries: (Australia) Jason Moodie (12)
- Goals: (Australia) Clinton Schifcofske (38)
- Points: (Australia) Clinton Schifcofske (104)
← 1999	List of seasons	2001 →

The 2000 Parramatta Eels season was the 54th in the club's history. Coached by Brian Smith and captained by Nathan Cayless, they competed in the National Rugby League's 2000 Telstra Premiership.

== Summary ==
Parramatta finished an inconsistent 2000 season in seventh place. However, in the first week of the Finals series, Parramatta was involved in a big upset, defeating the second placed Sydney Roosters 32–8 at the Sydney Football Stadium. There was only three points which separated the two clubs on the competition ladder.

The Parramatta side managed to repeat the result against local rivals Penrith the next week in a comfortable 28–10 win in front of 25,746 at the same venue, meaning that the club reached their third straight NRL Preliminary Final. Parramatta were looking to make it "Third Time Lucky" against the former NRL premiers, Brisbane Broncos, but it ended up to be "Third Time Unlucky" as the Broncos won the match 16–10. Parramatta were known throughout the 2000 season as the "Baby Eels" due to the club having only eight players in the entire squad who were over the age of 25.

== Standings ==
2000 NRL season
Pos	Team	Pld	W	D	L	PF	PA	PD	Pts	Qualification
1	Brisbane Broncos (P)	26	18	2	6	696	388	+308	38	Advance to finals series
2	Sydney Roosters	26	16	0	10	601	520	+81	32	Advance to finals series
3	Newcastle Knights	26	15	1	10	686	532	+154	31	Advance to finals series
4	Canberra Raiders	26	15	0	11	506	479	+27	30	Advance to finals series
5	Penrith Panthers	26	15	0	11	573	562	+11	30	Advance to finals series
6	Melbourne Storm	26	14	1	11	672	529	+143	29	Advance to finals series
7	Parramatta Eels	26	14	1	11	476	456	+20	29	Advance to finals series
8	Cronulla-Sutherland Sharks	26	13	0	13	570	463	+107	26	Advance to finals series
9	St George Illawarra Dragons	26	12	0	14	576	656	−80	24	
10	Wests Tigers	26	11	2	13	519	642	−123	24	
11	Canterbury-Bankstown Bulldogs	26	10	1	15	469	553	−84	21	
12	Northern Eagles	26	9	0	17	476	628	−152	18	
13	Auckland Warriors	26	8	2	16	426	662	−236	18	
14	North Queensland Cowboys	26	7	0	19	436	612	−176	12 (Note: North Queensland were stripped of two competition points due to a breach of the interchange rule in round 4.)	

Source: RLP
(P) Premiers

== Awards ==
- Michael Cronin clubman of the year award: Michael Vella
- Ken Thornett Medal (Players' player): Nathan Hindmarsh
- Jack Gibson Award (Coach's award): Brett Hodgson
- Eric Grothe Rookie of the Year Award: Andrew Ryan
