= 2000 Cronulla-Sutherland Sharks season =

34th season in the club's history

- NRL rank: 8th
- 2000 record: Wins: 13; draws: 0; losses: 14
- Points scored: For: 590 (105 tries, 85 goals); against: 497 (85 tries, 78 goals, 1 field goal)

Team information
- Coach: John Lang
- Captain: Andrew Ettingshausen Mitch Healey David Peachey Jason Stevens Andrew Pierce
- Stadium: Toyota Park
- Avg. attendance: 13,597

Top scorers
- Tries: Mat Rogers (18)
- Goals: Mat Rogers (70)
- Points: Mat Rogers (212)
← 1999	2001 →

The 2000 Cronulla-Sutherland Sharks season was the 34th in the club's history. They competed in the NRL's 2000 Telstra Premiership.

== Ladder ==
2000 NRL season
Pos	Team	Pld	W	D	L	PF	PA	PD	Pts
1	Brisbane Broncos (P)	26	18	2	6	696	388	+308	38
2	Sydney Roosters	26	16	0	10	601	520	+81	32
3	Newcastle Knights	26	15	1	10	686	532	+154	31
4	Canberra Raiders	26	15	0	11	506	479	+27	30
5	Penrith Panthers	26	15	0	11	573	562	+11	30
6	Melbourne Storm	26	14	1	11	672	529	+143	29
7	Parramatta Eels	26	14	1	11	476	456	+20	29
8	Cronulla-Sutherland Sharks	26	13	0	13	570	463	+107	26
9	St George Illawarra Dragons	26	12	0	14	576	656	−80	24
10	Wests Tigers	26	11	2	13	519	642	−123	24
11	Canterbury-Bankstown Bulldogs	26	10	1	15	469	553	−84	21
12	Northern Eagles	26	9	0	17	476	628	−152	18
13	Auckland Warriors	26	8	2	16	426	662	−236	18
14	North Queensland Cowboys	26	7	0	19	436	612	−176	12 (Note: North Queensland were stripped of 2 competition points due to a breach of the interchange rule in Round 4.)

(P) Premiers

== Results ==
5 February 2000 Round 1	St. George Illawarra Dragons	12 – 28	Cronulla-Sutherland Sharks	Stadium Australia
				Attendance: 62,255

12 February 2000 Round 2	Cronulla-Sutherland Sharks	28 – 2	Sydney Roosters	Toyota Park, Woolooware
				Attendance: 13,112

19 February 2000 Round 3	Parramatta Eels	19 – 18	Cronulla-Sutherland Sharks	Parramatta Stadium
				Attendance: 13,243

26 February 2000 Round 4	Cronulla-Sutherland Sharks	14 – 18	Brisbane Broncos	Toyota Park, Woolooware
				Attendance: 15,969

4 March 2000 Round 5	North Queensland Cowboys	12 – 26	Cronulla-Sutherland Sharks	Dairy Farmers Stadium
				Attendance: 15,890

13 March 2000 Round 6	Cronulla-Sutherland Sharks	14 – 4	Canterbury-Bankstown Bulldogs	Toyota Park, Woolooware
				Attendance: 11,455

18 March 2000 Round 7	Northern Eagles	30 – 2	Cronulla-Sutherland Sharks	Brookvale Oval
				Attendance: 12,228

25 March 2000 Round 8	Cronulla-Sutherland Sharks	26 – 14	Melbourne Storm	Toyota Park, Woolooware
				Attendance: 15,181

1 April 2000 Round 9	Cronulla-Sutherland Sharks	12 – 16	Wests Tigers	Toyota Park, Woolooware
				Attendance: 13,137

9 April 2000 Round 10	Canberra Raiders	24 – 18	Cronulla-Sutherland Sharks	Bruce Stadium
				Attendance: 12,612

14 April 2000 Round 11	Cronulla-Sutherland Sharks	42 – 16	Newcastle Knights	Toyota Park, Woolooware
				Attendance: 13,206

24 April 2000 Round 12	Auckland Warriors	24 – 20	Cronulla-Sutherland Sharks	Ericsson Stadium
				Attendance: 11,915

30 April 2000 Round 13	Sydney Roosters	16 – 14	Cronulla-Sutherland Sharks	Sydney Football Stadium
				Attendance: 12,236

6 May 2000 Round 14	Cronulla-Sutherland Sharks	28 – 8	Northern Eagles	Toyota Park, Woolooware
				Attendance: 12,231

14 May 2000 Round 15	Cronulla-Sutherland Sharks	26 – 28	Penrith Panthers	Toyota Park, Woolooware
				Attendance: 8,736

20 May 2000 Round 16	Cronulla-Sutherland Sharks	26 – 18	Canberra Raiders	Toyota Park, Woolooware
				Attendance: 11,432

26 May 2000 Round 17	Brisbane Broncos	32 – 4	Cronulla-Sutherland Sharks	ANZ Stadium
				Attendance: 19,665

3 June 2000 Round 18	Cronulla-Sutherland Sharks	42 – 6	North Queensland Cowboys	Toyota Park, Woolooware
				Attendance: 11,101

12 June 2000 Round 19	Canterbury-Bankstown Bulldogs	14 – 26	Cronulla-Sutherland Sharks	Stadium Australia
				Attendance: 13,269

18 June 2000 Round 20	Cronulla-Sutherland Sharks	40 – 10	St. George Illawarra Dragons	Toyota Park, Woolooware
				Attendance: 19,507

23 June 2000 Round 21	Melbourne Storm	22 – 16	Cronulla-Sutherland Sharks	Melbourne Cricket Ground
				Attendance: 15,535

1 July 2000 Round 22	Wests Tigers	24 – 22	Cronulla-Sutherland Sharks	Leichhardt Oval
				Attendance: 12,719

8 July 2000 Round 23	Cronulla-Sutherland Sharks	22 – 12	Auckland Warriors	Toyota Park, Woolooware
				Attendance: 10,635

14 July 2000 Round 24	Newcastle Knights	20 – 16	Cronulla-Sutherland Sharks	Marathon Stadium
				Attendance: 25,685

23 July 2000 Round 25	Cronulla-Sutherland Sharks	34 – 18	Parramatta Eels	Toyota Park, Woolooware
				Attendance: 21,017

30 July 2000 Round 26	Penrith Panthers	44 – 6	Cronulla-Sutherland Sharks	Penrith Football Stadium
				Attendance: 20,510
