= Craig Trindall =

Australian rugby league footballer

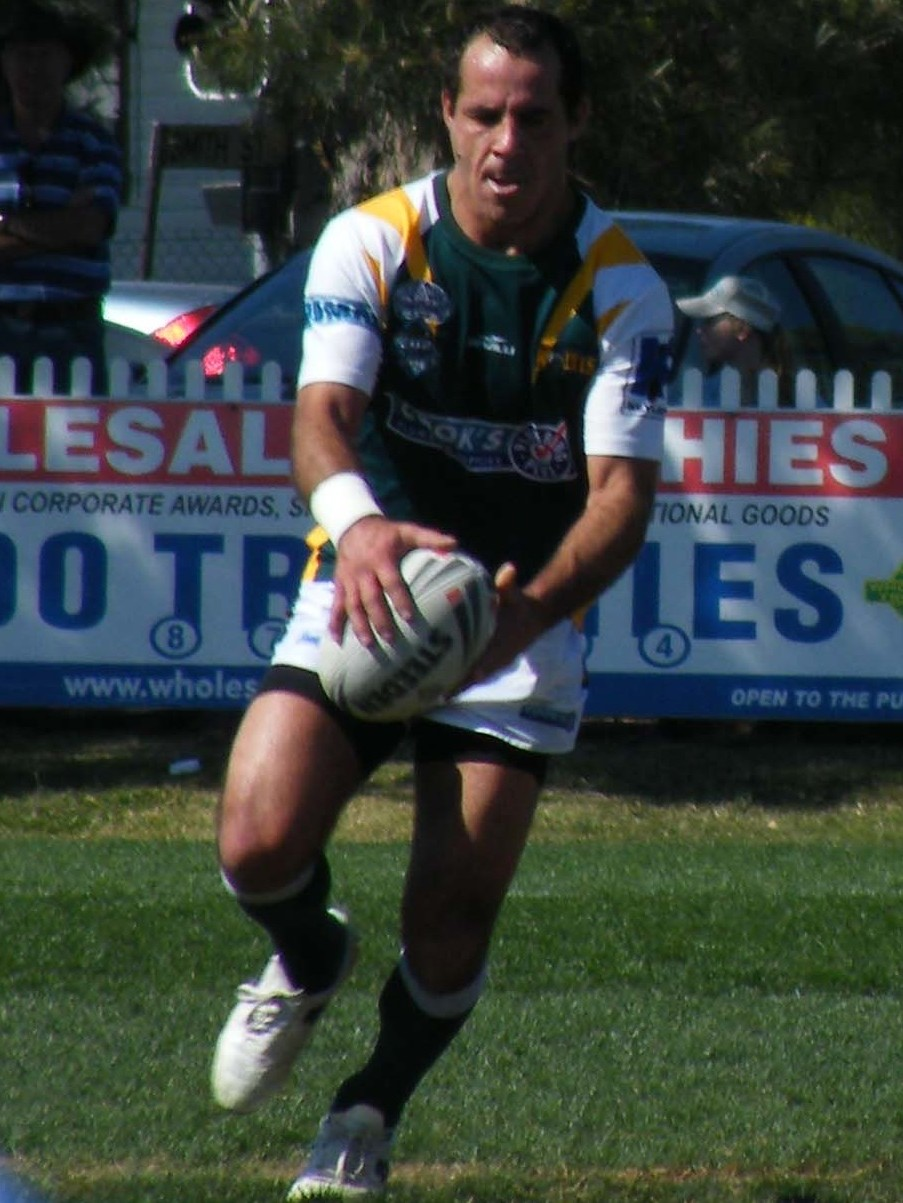

Personal information
- Born: 8 May 1979 (age 47) Wee Waa, New South Wales, Australia

Playing information
- Position: Halfback, Five-eighth
Club
Years	Team	Pld	T	G	FG	P
2006	Penrith Panthers	3	0	0	1	1
- Relatives: Darrell Trindall (brother); Steve Trindall (brother)

Craig Trindall (born 8 May 1979) is an Australian former professional rugby league footballer who played for the Penrith Panthers in the National Rugby League. His position was halfback or five-eighth. He is the brother of former South Sydney Rabbitohs player, Darrell Trindall and Steve Trindall.

== Background ==
Trindall was born in Wee Waa, New South Wales, Australia.

== Playing career ==
Trindall was part of the Under 19s Penrith Super League premiership winning team in 1997 before having lower grade stints at Parramatta and South Sydney. He then left South Sydney and began playing for the Windsor club in the Jim Beam Cup. It was from there he made a return to Penrith in 2006, playing halfback for the St. Mary’s-Penrith Cougars. Trindall made his first grade debut for Penrith in round 19 of the 2007 NRL season against North Queensland, kicking a field goal in the clubs 17-16 victory. Trindall played two further games for Penrith. In 2008, he signed with the Canterbury-Bankstown Bulldogs but was not able to make it into the first grade team and would return to Windsor, being part of their Jim Beam Cup (third tier) premiership winning team. He would remain at Windsor club for a number of seasons, playing Premier League when they were the Penrith feeder team (as a non NRL contracted player) and in 2012 was named in the Windsor Team of the Century.

== Career highlights ==
- Junior Club: Colyton Colts
- Previous Clubs: Windsor
- First Grade Debut: 2006 v Cowboys

== Controversy ==
In 2006, The National Rugby League's Anti-Doping tribunal imposed a 12-week suspended sentence on Craig Trindall for cannabis use.

In 2007, Craig Trindall was charged with maliciously inflicting grievous bodily harm after allegedly bashing a woman in the face with a children's blackboard.
