= Paul Okesene =

Samoa & American Samoa international rugby league footballer

Personal information
- Born: 14 November 1967 Auckland, New Zealand
- Died: 15 September 2012 (aged 44) France
- Relatives: Hitro Okesene (brother); Aseta Redican (aunt)
- Rugby league career

Playing information
- Position: Wing
Club
Years	Team	Pld	T	G	FG	P
	Manukau Magpies
1988–1989	Sheffield Eagles		4	0	0	16
1994	Counties Manukau	22	2	0	0	8
	Total	22	6	0	0	24
Representative
Years	Team	Pld	T	G	FG	P
1986–1991	Auckland
1986–1990	Western Samoa	3	1
1992–1994	American Samoa	2	0	0	0	0

Paul Okesene (/oʊkəsiːni/) (14 November 1967 – 15 September 2012) was a Samoan rugby league footballer who represented both Western Samoa and American Samoa.

== Background ==
His brothers, Hitro and Keneti Taogaga, also played international rugby league.

== Playing career ==
A Manukau Magpies junior in the Auckland Rugby League competition, Paul Okesene played for Western Samoa in 1986, at the Pacific Cup. He spent the 1988/89 season with the Sheffield Eagles.

In 1992, he again played in the Pacific Cup, this time for American Samoa.

In 1994, Paul Okesene played for the Counties Manukau Heroes in the new Lion Red Cup. He left the club at the end of the year, signing to play in France.

Also played Rugby league for Keighley RLFC

== Later years ==
Paul died 15 September 2012 due to a heart attack. At the time of his death, he was working as a bus driver for French rugby union club USA Perpignan.
