= George Longbottom =

Australian rugby league player (born 1961)

Personal information
- Born: 8 February 1961 (age 64); Australia

Playing information
- Position: Wing, Halfback
Club
Years	Team	Pld	T	G	FG	P
1983–85	South Sydney	14	7	2	1	33
Representative
Years	Team	Pld	T	G	FG	P
1992	Australian Aboriginies

George Longbottom is an Australian rugby league player who played professionally for the South Sydney Rabbitohs.

== Playing career ==
Between 1983 and 1985 Longbottom played fourteen matches for the South Sydney Rabbitohs, scoring thirty-three points.

In 1992 he played for the Australian Aboriginies side in the Pacific Cup.
