= Hitro Okesene =

New Zealand & Samoa international rugby league footballer and coach

Personal information
- Born: John Haitrosene Okesene; 22 September 1970 (age 56) Auckland, New Zealand
- Relatives: Paul Okesene (brother); Aseta Redican (aunt)
- Rugby league career

Playing information
- Height: 180 cm (5 ft 11 in)
- Weight: 125 kg (19 st 10 lb)
- Position: Prop, hooker
Club
Years	Team	Pld	T	G	FG	P
1980–1993	Manukau
1989–1992	Carlisle	68	17	3	0	74
1994	Counties Manukau	23	3	0	0	12
1995–1997	Auckland Warriors	22	2	0	0	8
1998	Hull Sharks	22	0	0	0	0
1999	Featherstone Rovers	32	3	0	0	12
2000	XIII Catalan
2001–2003	Workington Town	93	10	0	0	40
	Total	260	35	3	0	146
Representative
Years	Team	Pld	T	G	FG	P
1988–1989	Western Samoa	1	0	0	0	0
1992–1997	American Samoa	7	2	0	0	0
1990–1994	Auckland	9	1	1	0	6
1994–1995	New Zealand	5	1	0	0	4

Coaching information
Club
Years	Team	Gms	W	D	L	W%
2003–2005	Ellenborough RLFC

John Haitrosene "Hitro" Okesene (/haɪtroʊ oʊkəsiːni/) (born 22 September 1970), also known by the nickname "Nitro", is a former professional rugby league footballer who played in the 1990s and 2000s and represented three countries; Western Samoa, American Samoa and New Zealand.

== Background ==
He was born in Auckland, New Zealand. His brothers Paul and Keneti Taogaga also played international rugby league.

== Playing career ==
His early years saw him play in both Auckland competitions, for the Manukau club, and for Carlisle in the English competition during the New Zealand off-season. In 1994 he captained the Counties Manukau Heroes in the Lion Red Cup, and in 1995 was part of the inaugural Auckland Warriors squad. He stayed with Auckland for another two seasons before moving the England to play in the Super League. He played for both the Hull Sharks and Featherstone Rovers before settling at lower division club, Workington Town. There, as in Auckland, he became a cult figure.

=== Representative career ===
Okesene was a Junior Kiwi in 1988 and 1989. In 1988 he also represented Western Samoa in the Pacific Cup. He later represented American Samoa at the 1992 Pacific Cup alongside his brother Paul.

He played at either prop or hooker and represented the New Zealand on five occasions both on the 1994 tour of Australia and Papua New Guinea, and at the 1995 Rugby League World Cup.

== Retirement ==
In 2003 he retired due to knee troubles and became coach of the Ellenborough Rangers who competed in the Cumbria Amateur Rugby League. He was replaced in 2005 but remains in Cumbria, working in the construction industry.

== Personal life ==
Okesene now resides in Cumbria with his wife Donna and three children: Shakayla, Giovanna and Lerocco.
