= Aseta Redican =

New Zealand physiotherapist and health administrator (born 1941)

Aseta Redican MNZM
- Redican in 2020
- Born: Aseta Okesene; 26 December 1941 (age 84); Tuasivi, Savaiʻi, Samoa
- Education: University of Otago
- Occupations: Physiotherapist; health administrator
- Board member of: The Fred Hollows Foundation; National Heart Foundation of New Zealand
- Spouse: Peter Redican (m. 1966; died 2019)
- Relatives: Hitro Okesene (nephew); Paul Okesene (nephew)
- Awards: Doctor of Science (honoris causa) (Otago)

Aseta Redican MNZM (née Okesene; born 26 December 1941) is a health administrator known for being New Zealand's first Pacific graduate in physiotherapy, her creation of a physiotherapy service in Samoa, and as a leader in the development of Pacific health services in New Zealand. She is a Member of the New Zealand Order of Merit and was conferred an honorary Doctor of Science degree by the University of Otago in 2026.

== Early life and family ==
Redican was born Aseta Okesene at Tuasivi on the island of Savaiʻi in Samoa on 26 December 1941. Her mother, Matelina Okesene, was a nurse, and her father, Ioane Okesene, was a physician. Her father had changed his family name from Tilialo to Okesene, a Samoan transliteration of 'oxygen', when he graduated from medical school in Fiji, and he gave all of his children chemistry-related names; Aseta means 'acid'.

Aseta Okesene moved to New Zealand as a 14-year-old in 1956 when she was awarded a government scholarship to attend a boarding school in Stratford. She went on to study at the University of Otago, earning in 1964 a postgraduate diploma in physiotherapy, the first Pacific person to do so.

In about 1966, she married Peter Joseph Redican, and the couple had two children; Peter Redican died in 2019. She is the aunt of rugby league players Hitro and Paul Okesene.

She became a naturalised New Zealand citizen in 1969.

== Career ==
=== Physiotherapy ===
After graduating and working for a year at Auckland Hospital, Redican returned to Samoa to establish the first physiotherapy department at Apia General Hospital, which gave paraplegic patients, people affected by poliomyelitis and muscular dystrophy, and post-operative cases access to care.

She later returned to Auckland, working in the National Women's Hospital antenatal unit and then at Cornwall Hospital, before establishing a private physiotherapy practice.

=== Health services leader ===
Moving into population health services, Redican established the Pacific Heartbeat programme at the National Heart Foundation of New Zealand, where she created a model that trained Pacific people to work in their own communities rather than distributing printed material to them. Such an approach was considered radical at the time, but it has since been used across the healthcare sector.

Redican's leadership within the Northern Regional Health Authority (North Health) saw the establishment of a number of Pacific primary healthcare providers and community partnerships that still exist today. Later, as the first general manager of Pacific health with the Auckland District Health Board, she established the Pacific Family Support Service at Starship Hospital, two Pacific primary health organisations, and ensured that Pacific health was included as one of the organisation's strategic priorities.

=== Community service ===
Redican was a founder of the Pacific Medical Association, and is a founding member of PACIFICA Inc, a national organisation for Pacific women living in New Zealand, which she represented on the committee monitoring the implementation of the Cartwright Inquiry recommendations.

She is also a founding member of the National Council of Samoan Women in New Zealand.

== Honours and awards ==
In the 2020 Queen's Birthday Honours, Redican was appointed a Member of the New Zealand Order of Merit, for services to health and Pacific peoples. On 22 August 2026, the University of Otago awarded Redican an honorary Doctor of Science degree.

Redican is a life member of Physiotherapy New Zealand and patron of the Pasifika Physiotherapy Association in New Zealand.

== See also ==
- List of honorary doctors of the University of Otago
