= Darren Rameka =

New Zealand rugby league footballer

Personal information
- Full name: Darren Rameka
- Born: 10 July 1973 (age 53) Wellington, New Zealand
- Height: 181 cm (5 ft 11 in)
- Weight: 92 kg (14 st 7 lb)

Playing information
- Position: Prop, Second-row
Club
Years	Team	Pld	T	G	FG	P
1994	Wellington City Dukes	19	5	0	0	20
1995–96	Eastern Suburbs	16	1	0	0	4
1997	St. George Dragons	6	1	0	0	4
1998	Western Suburbs	7	0	0	0	0
	Total	48	7	0	0	28
Representative
Years	Team	Pld	T	G	FG	P
1990–??	Wellington
1994–99	New Zealand Māori
1997	Rest of the World	1	1	0	0	4
- Source: As of 23 January 2019

Darren Rameka is a New Zealand former professional rugby league footballer who played professionally in Australia.

== Playing career ==
Rameka played for the New Zealand Māori in the 1994 Pacific Cup. He again played for the Māori in a 1999 match against the Great Britain Lions.

In 1995, Rameka made his professional debut, playing for the Sydney City Roosters. He played two seasons for the Roosters before moving to the St. George Dragons in 1997.

During the Super League war he represented the Australian Rugby League's Rest of the World side in 1997. He then spent the 1998 season with the Western Suburbs Magpies. He remained with Wests in 1999 but did not play a first grade match.
