= John Lomax (rugby league) =

New Zealand international rugby league footballer

Personal information
- Full name: John Junior Lomax
- Born: 2 February 1966 (age 60) Wellington, New Zealand

Playing information
- Position: Prop
Club
Years	Team	Pld	T	G	FG	P
1988–92	Wainuiomata Lions
1993–96	Canberra Raiders	65	3	1	0	14
1997–99	North Qld Cowboys	44	1	0	0	4
2000	Melbourne Storm	3	0	0	0	0
	Total	112	4	1	0	18
Representative
Years	Team	Pld	T	G	FG	P
1988–92	Wellington	25
1990–92	New Zealand Māori
1993–98	New Zealand	16	0	0	0	0
- Relatives: David Lomax (brother); Willie Raston (nephew)

John Junior Lomax (born 6 February 1966) is a New Zealand former professional rugby league footballer who played in the 1980s, 1990s and 2000s. Primarily a prop, he captained New Zealand and played for the Canberra Raiders, North Queensland Cowboys and Melbourne Storm.

== Background ==
Born in Wellington, New Zealand, Lomax played his junior rugby league for the Wainuiomata Lions. His younger brother, David, was also a professional rugby league player, who represented New Zealand.

== Playing career ==
In 1989, Lomax, alongside his three brothers (Arnold, Tony and David), played for Wainuiomata in their Wellington Rugby League Grand Final win over Upper Hutt. In 1990, Wainuiomata won the Wellington Rugby League and the national Lion Red Cup competitions. That year, he represented the New Zealand Māori team against Great Britain. He later played at the 1992 Pacific Cup.

In 1992, Lomax and his three brothers represented Wellington against Bay of Plenty. All four brothers later played in the Lions 25–18 national Grand Final win over the Northcote Tigers. In 1993, he was invited to be part of an Auckland Invitational XIII side that drew 16-all with the Balmain Tigers.

=== Canberra Raiders ===
In 1993, Lomax moved to Australia, joining the Canberra Raiders in the NSWRL Premiership. In Round 1 of the 1993 NSWRL season, he made his first grade debut in Canberra's 8–22 loss to the St George Dragons. In his debut season for the club, he played 20 games, starting all 20 at prop. In June 1993, he made his debut for New Zealand, playing in their three-game series against Australia. At the end of the year, he was selected to go on the 1993 New Zealand rugby league tour of Great Britain and France, playing in all five test matches.

In 1994, Lomax played 23 games for the Raiders and won the club's Player of the Year award but missed their Grand Final win over the Canterbury-Bankstown Bulldogs due to suspension. A week earlier, he was sent off and charged for a high shot on Billy Moore in the side's 22–9 preliminary final win over the North Sydney Bears.

In 1995, he played just 10 games for the Raiders but captained New Zealand for the first time in their mid-season series against France. On 23 June 1995, he captained New Zealand for the third and final time in an 8–26 loss to Australia. In October 1995, he represented New Zealand at the 1995 Rugby League World Cup, playing one game.

In Round 12 of the 1996 ARL season, Lomax collected Parramatta's Adam Ritson with a high tackle, knocking him out. Following the incident, a routine scan discovered that Ritson had a life-threatening brain cyst, from which he would never fully recover, ending his career.

=== North Queensland Cowboys ===
In 1997, Lomax signed with the North Queensland Cowboys, joining his former Raiders' head coach Tim Sheens at the club. In his first season at the Cowboys, he played 15 games, missing three weeks due to suspension. That year, he became the club's first New Zealand international when he played in the Kiwis' 30–12 win over Australia.

In 1998, he took over as captain of the Cowboys and won the club's Player of the Year award. On 24 April 1998, he started at prop for the Kiwis in their 22–16 ANZAC Test win over Australia, his last game for his country. In 1999, Lomax played just eight NRL games due to injury.

=== Melbourne Storm ===
In 2000, Lomax moved to the Melbourne Storm, playing just three games for the club before retiring at the end of the season.

== Achievements and accolades ==
=== Individual ===
- Mal Meninga Medal: 1994
- North Queensland Cowboys Player of the Year: 1998

== Statistics ==
=== NSWRL/ARL/Super League/NRL ===
Season	Team	Matches	T	G	GK %	F/G	Pts
1993	Canberra	20	1	1	33.3	0	6
1994	Canberra	23	1	0	—	0	4
1995	Canberra	10	1	0	—	0	4
1996	Canberra	12	0	0	—	0	0
1997	North Queensland	15	1	0	—	0	4
1998	North Queensland	21	0	0	—	0	0
1999	North Queensland	8	0	0	—	0	0
2000	Melbourne	3	0	0	—	0	0
Career totals		112	4	1	33.33	0	18

=== International ===
Season	Team	Matches	T	G	GK %	F/G	Pts
1993	New Zealand	8	0	0	—	0	0
1994	New Zealand	2	0	0	—	0	0
1995	New Zealand	4	0	0	—	0	0
1997	New Zealand	1	0	0	—	0	0
1998	New Zealand	1	0	0	—	0	0
Career totals		16	0	0	—	0	0

== Post-playing career ==
After retirement, Lomax became an organiser for the Construction, Forestry, Mining and Energy Union in Australia. In 2015, he was arrested and charged with blackmail during the Royal Commission into trade union governance and corruption.

In October 2015, ACT prosecutors dropped the blackmail charge against him. He is believed to have received a large payout from the Australian Federal police for wrongful arrest

In 2012, he was named at prop in the Wellington Rugby League's Team of the Century.

== Personal life ==
Lomax's son, Tyrel, currently plays for Super Rugby club Hurricanes and represented the All Blacks in 2018.
