= Albert Fulivai =

Tonga international rugby league footballer

Personal information
- Born: 25 June 1968 (age 58)

Playing information
- Position: Wing, Centre
Club
| Years | Team | Pld | T | G | FG | P |
|---|---|---|---|---|---|---|
| 1993–98 | Canberra Raiders | 44 | 22 | 0 | 0 | 88 |
Representative
| Years | Team | Pld | T | G | FG | P |
| 1994 | Tonga | 1 | 2 | 0 | 0 | 8 |

Albert Fulivai (born 25 June 1968) is an Australian former rugby union and professional rugby league footballer who played in the 1980s and 1990s. He played representative level rugby union (RU) for Australian Schoolboys and Australia national under-21's, and representative level rugby league (RL) for Tonga, and at club level for the Canberra Raiders, as a wing or centre.

== Playing career ==
Fulivai attended St Edmund's College and originally played rugby union. In 1986 he was the vice captain of the Australian Schoolboys team that toured Belgium, The Netherlands and the British Isles. Fulivai then toured New Zealand with the Australian under-21 side.

He then switched to rugby league and joined the Canberra Raiders. He made his first grade debut in 1993, against the Illawarra Steelers. Fulivai played forty four first grade matches for the club over six seasons. He was a non-playing reserve in Canberra's 1994 grand final win.

Fulivai played for Tonga at the 1994 Pacific Cup, which Tonga won.

In 1995 he was picked for Tonga for the World Cup but had to withdraw due to injury.
