= Adam Ritson =

Australian rugby league footballer

Personal information
- Born: 6 August 1976 (age 50) Sydney
- Height: 6 ft 1 in (185 cm)

Playing information
- Position: Prop
Club
Years	Team	Pld	T	G	FG	P
1993–95	Cronulla Sharks	29	1	0	0	4
1996	Parramatta Eels	11	1	0	0	4
	Total	40	2	0	0	8
Representative
Years	Team	Pld	T	G	FG	P
1995	City Origin	1	0	0	0	0
- Source: RLP

Adam Ritson (born 6 August 1976) is an Australian former professional rugby league footballer who played for the Cronulla-Sutherland Sharks and the Parramatta Eels in the New South Wales Rugby League competition in Australia. His position of choice was at prop forward.

== Childhood and early career ==
Ritson was born in Sydney. He began playing rugby league at an early age for the Miranda Magpies in the Sutherland Shire and was quickly earmarked as a star player for his advanced skills at such a young age along with his size. He later moved on to rival club the Engadine Dragons before being signed to the Cronulla-Sutherland Sharks at an early age.

While attending De La Salle in 1993, Ritson was selected to play for the Australian Schoolboys team.

== Cronulla-Sutherland Sharks ==
His talent was noticed immediately at the Cronulla club impressing coaches at all levels, including first grade coach Arthur Beetson. Beetson immediately drafted Ritson into the Sharks first grade team while he was still only sixteen years of age in 1993, making him one of the youngest ever first grade players. Ritson then went on to make several appearances over the next three seasons for the club.

After impressing all with his talent, skill and size at such a young age and appearing in the Sharks Presidents Cup final victory in 1994, as well as tasting his first representative game with the City Origin side, Adam found himself in the middle of a battle for his signature between the Australian Rugby League and Super League competitions. Ritson decided on staying with the Australian Rugby League, essentially meaning he would have to leave his Cronulla club after they had signed on to become a Super League team making himself a free-agent after the 1995 season.

After the Super League war had begun on 30 March 1995 with the rebel competition signing a number of teams and players, it was Ritson who inadvertently alerted the ARL to what was happening. Super League were signing Cronulla players following their win over new team the Western Reds in Perth when Ritson, showing maturity belying his 18 years, balked at signing, stating that he wished to speak to his manager and his parents first. Ritson was then allowed to phone his manager back in Sydney to discuss the SL offer. Following this his manager immediately rang the ARL to inform them what was going on. After talking to his manager (as well as seeking advice from his parents) he then signed with the SL, but was given a 24-hour cooling-off period should he wish to back out of the deal. Ritson ultimately did back out of the deal and would eventually sign with the ARL.

== Parramatta Eels ==
With his signature being chased after by the majority of ARL clubs Ritson eventually agreed to sign for the Parramatta Eels for the start of the 1996 season. Adam was placed into the Eels starting line-up with immediate effect and after playing just eleven games for his new club tragedy struck in a fixture against the Canberra Raiders. Just two minutes into the game he was knocked unconscious after a dangerous high tackle from Canberra forward John Lomax and with the completion of the game and a routine scan it was discovered he had a life-threatening brain cyst. Ritson then went on to have fourteen operations over the next year, several of which nearly left him dead. Eventually he made a full recovery but was never the same and retired from the game later that year at the age of twenty.

After his career was effectively over at such a young age, a lawsuit was filed by Ritson first against Lomax for the high tackle, but was then shifted towards his club the Raiders instead. Eventually the case was settled out of court, with Ritson being given a six-figure sum.
