= Earl Va'a =

Samoa dual-code international rugby footballer

Personal information
- Born: 1 May 1972 (age 54) Wellington, New Zealand
- Height: 5 ft 5 in (166 cm)
- Weight: 79 kg (12 st 6 lb)

Playing information

Rugby league
- Position: Fullback, Five-eighth
Club
Years	Team	Pld	T	G	FG	P
	Wainuiomata Lions
1994–95	Wellington City	33	17	82	3	235
1996	Hutt Valley Dolphins	18	6	67	2	160
	Total	51	23	149	5	395
Representative
Years	Team	Pld	T	G	FG	P
1994–1995	Western Samoa

Rugby union
- Position: Flyhalf
Club
Years	Team	Pld	T	G	FG	P
	Richmond
	L'Aquila
	Worcester
	Total	0	0	0	0	0
Representative
Years	Team	Pld	T	G	FG	P
1996–03	Samoa	29				189

Earl Va'a (born 1 May 1972) is a former rugby union and rugby league footballer who played internationally for Samoa. He has played as a fly-half in union and as a fullback and five-eighth in league.

== Background ==
Va'a was born in Wellington, New Zealand.

== Rugby league ==
Va'a started his career playing rugby league for the Wainuiomata Lions in New Zealand, and made his representative debut for Wellington in 1993. In 1994 and 1995 he represented the Wellington City Dukes in the Lion Red Cup. He toured New Zealand with Western Samoa in 1994, and was named in their 1994 Pacific Cup squad. He was also selected in Samoa's squad for the 1995 Rugby League World Cup although he did not play any matches during the tournament. Va'a scored 395 points in the three years of the Lion Red Cup, playing for both Wellington and the Hutt Valley Dolphins.

== Rugby union ==
After switching to rugby union he represented Samoa from 1996 until 1999 including the 1999 Rugby World Cup. He also played for Samoa at the 2003 Rugby World Cup. He has played rugby for Richmond, L'Aquila and Worcester. He is also the top point scorer for Samoa.

At 5'5 Earl Va'a is one of the shortest professional players in world rugby and was officially the shortest player at the 2003 Rugby World Cup.

He coached the Wellington Lions in the 2015 ITM Cup but resigned in 2016.

== Sources ==
- Andrews, Malcolm (2006) The ABC of Rugby League Austn Broadcasting Corpn, Sydney
