= Willie Raston =

New Zealand rugby league footballer

Personal information
- Born: 21 April 1984 (age 42) Palmerston North, New Zealand

Playing information
- Position: Prop
Club
Years	Team	Pld	T	G	FG	P
2006	Canberra Raiders	3	0	0	0	0
- Relatives: David Lomax (uncle); John Lomax (uncle)

Willie Raston (born 21 April 1984) is a New Zealand former professional rugby league footballer who played in the 2000s for the Canberra Raiders in the National Rugby League.

== Early life ==
Born in Palmerston North, Raston is a nephew of New Zealand international John Lomax.

== Playing career ==
Raston, a prop, is a former Junior Kiwis representative and played for the New Zealand Maoris in 2005. He played in the first three rounds of the 2006 NRL season for Canberra. This included two heavy losses, where Canberra conceded over 50 points and Raston lost his place in the side.
