= Jimmy Veikoso =

Tonga international rugby league footballer

Personal information
- Born: 31 May 1971 (age 53); Tonga

Playing information
- Position: Wing
Club
Years	Team	Pld	T	G	FG	P
1993–94	Canberra Raiders	4	0	0	0	0
1995–97	Leigh	42	23	2	0	96
1997–98	Swinton Lions	37	9	0	0	36
	Total	83	32	2	0	132
Representative
Years	Team	Pld	T	G	FG	P
1992–95	Tonga	3	2	0	0	8

Jimmy Veikoso (born 31 May 1971) is a Tongan former professional rugby league footballer who represented Tonga at the 1995 World Cup.

== Playing career ==
Veikoso played for the Canberra Raiders in 1993 and 1994. He represented Tonga at the 1992 Pacific Cup and the 1995 World Cup.

In 1996 and 1997 Veikoso played for the Leigh Centurions. He then joined the Swinton Lions.

== Later years ==
Veikoso later took up rugby union, playing for the Sydney Harlequins in the New South Wales Suburban Rugby Union.

Veikoso took up bodybuilding and entered national competitions in 2007.
