= David Lomax =

New Zealand rugby league footballer and coach

Personal information
- Full name: David Walter Lomax
- Born: 21 September 1970 (age 56) Wellington, New Zealand

Playing information
- Position: Prop
Club
Years	Team	Pld	T	G	FG	P
	Wainuiomata Lions
1994–95	Canberra Raiders	4	0	0	0	0
1996	Western Reds	1	0	0	0	0
1997	Paris Saint-Germain	24	1	0	0	4
1998–99	Newcastle Knights	29	0	0	0	0
2000–01	Huddersfield-Sheffield	58	4	0	0	16
	Total	116	5	0	0	20
Representative
Years	Team	Pld	T	G	FG	P
	Wellington
1993	New Zealand Māori
1993	New Zealand	2	0	0	0	0
- Relatives: John Lomax (brother); Willie Raston (nephew)

David Walter Lomax (born 21 September 1970) is a New Zealand rugby league coach and former player who represented New Zealand. He is the brother of another international, John Lomax.

== Early years ==
Lomax grew up playing rugby league for the Wainuiomata Lions in the Wellington Rugby League competition and also represented Wellington at a provincial level.

During the 1992 season he lined up alongside three of his brothers; Tony, John and Arnold, for Wellington against Bay of Plenty. All four brothers also played for the Lions that year in their 25-18 national club grand final win over the Northcote Tigers. He represented the New Zealand Māori side in 1993.

== Playing career ==
He joined the Canberra Raiders about the same time as his brother John. However he could not break into the first grade team at Canberra and soon found himself moving around, spending seasons at the Western Reds and Paris Saint-Germain before settling at the Newcastle Knights where he played 29 matches. He then moved again, joining the merged Huddersfield-Sheffield side before retiring.

== Representative career ==
During the 1993 season, Lomax made the New Zealand national rugby league team, playing in two test matches.

== Coaching career ==
He later coached the Central Falcons in the Bartercard Cup, making sporadic appearances for the side off the bench. In 2006 he was the coach of the New Zealand Residents side that competed in the Trans Tasman Quadrangular Series. In 2007 he was appointed coach of the Junior Kiwis. He applied for the New Zealand national rugby league team coaching job in mid-2007 and was shortlisted however the job ultimately went to Gary Kemble. Lomax then relocated to Wellington where he coached the Te Aroha Eels in 2008 and 2009 before taking over the Porirua Vikings.

Lomax is coaching Wellington in the 2012 National Competition.
