= 1992 Pacific Cup (rugby league) =

- Number of teams: 10
- Host country: New Zealand
- Winner: Western Samoa (2nd title)
- Matches played: 24

The 1992 Pacific Cup was the sixth edition of the Pacific Cup, a rugby league tournament held between Pacific teams. The tournament was hosted by New Zealand and eventually won by Western Samoa, who defeated Tonga 18–12 in the final, after double extra time.

== Squads ==
- The Australian Aboriginal side included Darrell Trindall, Paul Davis, Wayne Alberts, George Longbottom and Will Robinson.
- American Samoa replaced Papua New Guinea at late notice. They included Hitro Okesene and his brothers Keneti Taogaga (who captained the squad) and Paul.
- The Cook Islands included Denvour Johnston.
- Fiji included James Pickering.
- New Zealand Māori squad: Peter Edwards, Whetu Taewa, Richie Barnett, David Ewe, Paul Nahu, Ruben Wiki, David Bailey, Jason Kaulima, Aron Conlon, Ken McIntosh, Mike Kini, Daryl Beazley, John Lomax, Mark Chambers, Dean Noble, Jason Lowrie, Syd Eru, Tukere Barlow, Anthony Edwards, captain Mark Woods, Kere Parata, Tahana Raumati, Jason Mackie and Neville Ramsey.
- Tonga included Esau Mann, Jimmy Veikoso, Willie Wolfgramm and Franklin Fonua.
- Western Samoa included Mike Setefano, Bryan Laumatia, Tony Tatupu and Paki, Paddy and Tony Tuimavave.
- Norfolk Island - Shaun Goudie (c), Matthew Reeves

Terry Jope, Brendan Christian, Brett Singer, John Adams, Brendon King, Jason Richards, Dylan Menzies, Peter Yager, Jeff Singer, Micky Saunders, Darren Nicolai, George Nabeaur, Kerry Nicholson, Shane Schmitz, Ian Kienan, Paul Dodds, Darren Trickey, Hayden Evans, Brendan King, Brian Buffett, Edan Mackie, Niel Christian and Brad Jones. Mal Snell (coach), Paul Christian (liaison office) and John Moochie Christian (first aid).[4]

=== Tournament team ===
The Tournament team was: Paki Tuimavave (Samoa), Richie Barnett (Māori), Darrell Trindall (Aboriginies), Jimmy Veikoso (Tonga), Samisoni Walai (Fiji), Steve Firth (Tonga), Darryl Beazley (Māori), John Lomax (Māori), Fred Sapata (Samoa), James Pickering (Fiji), Wayne Alberts (Aboriginies), Tony Tatupu (Samoa), Tony Tuimavave (Samoa). Bench: Will Robinson (Aboriginies), Paddy Tuimavave (Samoa), Dave Schaumkell (Tonga) and Jason Mackie (Māori).

== Results ==
=== Section 1 ===
	Team	Pld	W	D	L	Pts
1	Western Samoa	4	4	0	0	8
2	Tonga	4	3	0	1	6
3	Cook Islands	4	1	0	3	2
4	Niue	4	1	0	3	2
5	Fiji	4	1	0	3	2

18 October 1992
1300

Tonga	24 – 8	Niue
Tries: Taufa (2), Schaumkell, Vailohi; Goals: Firth (4)		Tries: Latoa, Papua

Carlaw Park, Auckland

18 October 1992
1430

Western Samoa	32 – 18	Fiji
Tries: V. Afoa (2), Elia (2), Tuisamoa, Tupou, Sapatu; Goals: Sapatu (2)		Tries: Koroi, Pickering, Cavuilati; Goals: Tuilevuka, Tabulutu (2)

Carlaw Park, Auckland

20 October 1992
1830

Cook Islands	23 – 22	Niue
Tries: Hall, Tamariki, Apai Pora; Goals: Thompson (5); Drop goals: Thompson		Tries: Saua, Manhani, Lokeni, Lavihoa; Goals: Hellisoe (2), Mautama

Carlaw Park, Auckland

20 October 1992
2000

Western Samoa	20 – 12	Tonga

Carlaw Park, Auckland

22 October 1992
1830

Niue	14 – 10	Fiji
Tries: Saua, Mautama, Tolomu; Goals: Saua		Tries: Thompson (2); Goals: Tabulutu

Carlaw Park, Auckland

22 October 1992
2000

Tonga	26 – 6	Cook Islands
Tries: S. Mafi (2), Vailohe (2), J. Veikoso, P. Mafi; Goals: P. Mafi		Tries: Dean; Goals: Thompson

Carlaw Park, Auckland

24 October 1992
1300

Western Samoa	66 – 12	Cook Islands
Tries: Tatupu (3), Sapatu (2), Simanu, V. Afoa, Campbell, Galuvao, Kaisa, Winterstein, P. Tuimavave; Goals: Galuvao (9)		Tries: Tamariki, Atatoa; Goals: Thompson (2)

Carlaw Park, Auckland

24 October 1992
1430

Tonga	23 – 20	Fiji
Tries: Fonua, Mann, J. Veikoso; Goals: Firth (5); Drop goals: Firth		Tries: Walai (3), Cavuilati; Goals: Tulekeba (2)

Carlaw Park, Auckland

26 October 1992
1300

Western Samoa	41 – 28	Niue
Tries: Maea (3), T. Tuimavave, Laumatia, F. Afoa, Palelei; Goals: Galuvao (6); Drop goals: Tuimavave		Tries: Latoa (2), Patterson, Saua, Folomu, Sekene; Goals: Saua, Sekene

Carlaw Park, Auckland

26 October 1992
1430

Fiji	58 – 6	Cook Islands
Tries: Robarts (3), Nadruku (2), Cavuilati, Nalagilagi, Taga, Tuilevuka, Pickering; Goals: Tuilevuka (6), Taga (3)		Tries: Roberts; Goals: Thompson

Carlaw Park, Auckland

=== Section 2 ===
	Team	Pld	W	D	L	Pts
1	Māori	4	4	0	0	8
2	Australian Aborigines	4	3	0	1	6
3	American Samoa	4	2	0	2	4
4	Tokelau	4	1	0	3	2
5	Norfolk Island	4	0	0	4	0

17 October 1992
1230

American Samoa	26 – 18	Tokelau
Tries: Vaisuai (2), Stewart (2), Grey; Goals: Grey (2), Vagana		Tries: Laumua (2), Ioane; Goals: Koloi (3)

Carlaw Park, Auckland

An opening ceremony was held at Carlaw Park before the New Zealand Māori v Australian Aborigines match.

17 October 1992
1530

Māori	36 – 24	Australian Aborigines
Tries: Nahu (2), Taewa, P. Edwards, Ewe, Barnett; Goals: McIntosh (6)		Tries: Trindall, Smith, Gagai, G. White; Goals: P. Davis (2), Hollingsworth, Trindall

Carlaw Park, Auckland

19 October 1992
1830

Māori	84 – 8	Norfolk Island
Tries: Woods (3), Conlon (2), Beazley (2), Ramsey (2) Mackie (2), Nahu, Wiki, Kaulima, Raumati, Parata; Goals: Nahu (5), Ewe (5)		Tries: Adams, Goudie

Carlaw Park, Auckland

19 October 1992
2000

Australian Aborigines	46 – 18	Tokelau

Carlaw Park, Auckland

21 October 1992
1830

Australian Aborigines	74 – 2	Norfolk Island
Tries: Clevin (3), G. White (2), Hollingsworth, T. White, Mareko, Longbottom, Seden, Binge, Wragg, Saunders; Goals: Hollingsworth (11)		Goals: B. Christian

Carlaw Park, Auckland

21 October 1992
2000

Māori	26 – 12	American Samoa
Tries: P. Edwards (2), Ewe, Beazley, Ramsay; Goals: McIntosh (3)		Tries: H. Okesene, Tusa; Goals: Okesene (2)

Carlaw Park, Auckland

24 October 1992
1300

American Samoa	94 – 2	Norfolk Island
Tries: Tusa (4), Grey (4), Malifa (2), Saeni (2), Stewart (2), Fanene, Pollard, Maiava; Goals: Grey (12), Machee		Goals: B. Christian

Davies Park, Huntly

24 October 1992
1430

Māori	38 – 14	Tokelau
Tries: Wiki (3), P. Edwards, Kaulima, Conlon, Raumati, Ramsay; Goals: Barlow (2), Rangi		Tries: Lia, Masi, Kalao; Goals: Fiaola

Davies Park, Huntly

26 October 1992
1300

Tokelau	44 – 8	Norfolk Island
Tries: Peau (2), Ariu (2), Koloi, Vaelia, Foua, E'Lia; Goals: Koloi (5), Ariu		Tries: Adams (2)

Jubilee Park, Whangārei

26 October 1992
1430

Australian Aborigines	32 – 14	American Samoa
Tries: Clevin, Gagai, Ardler, Alberts, Shaw, Wragge; Goals: Hollingsworth (2), B. Davis (2)		Tries: P. Okesene, Stewart, H. Okesene; Goals: Grey

Jubilee Park, Whangārei

=== Finals ===
Semifinals
1	NZ Māori	6
2	Tonga	18
1	Western Samoa	44
2	Australian Aboriginies	26

Finals
Tonga	14
Western Samoa	18
Third place
NZ Māori	44
Australian Aboriginies	12

==== Semi-finals ====
28 October 1992
1830

Western Samoa	44 – 26	Australian Aboriginies
Tries: Campbell (2), T. Tuimavave, V. Afoa, Tupou, F. Afoa, Sapatu, Tatupu, Winterstein; Goals: Tupou (3), Galuvao		Tries: B. Davis (2), Clevin (2), Trindall, Gagai; Goals: B. Davis

Carlaw Park, Auckland

28 October 1992
2000

Māori	6 – 18	Tonga
Tries: Ramsey; Goals: McIntosh		Tries: Taufa, Wolfgramm, Schaumkell; Goals: Firth (3)

Carlaw Park, Auckland

==== Third place playoff ====
31 October 1992
1300

Māori	44 – 12	Australian Aboriginies
Tries: Taewa (2), Barnett (2), Parata, McIntosh, Nahu, P. Edwards, Beazley; Goals: Nahu (4)		Tries: Saunders (2), Trindall

Carlaw Park, Auckland

==== Final ====
The six teams that did not make the semi-finals played in a Nines tournament at Jack Colvin Park on 29 October. The final was played as a curtain raiser to the Pacific Cup final and won by Tokelau who defeated Fiji. Tonga was captained by loose forward Mark Roiall

The match went into triple overtime after Tonga had led 12–4 after 55 minutes.

31 October 1992
1500

Tonga	12 – 18	Western Samoa
Tries: Matthew Roiall, J. Veikoso; Goals: Firth (2)		Tries: Setefano (2), Laumatia, Paki Tuimavave; Goals: Tupou

Carlaw Park, Auckland
