= Steve Trindall =

Australian rugby league footballer

Personal information
- Full name: Steve Trindall
- Born: 23 April 1973 (age 53) Wee Waa, New South Wales, Australia
- Height: 191 cm (6 ft 3 in)
- Weight: 113 kg (17 st 11 lb)

Playing information
- Position: Prop
Club
Years	Team	Pld	T	G	FG	P
1993–95	Canberra	5	0	0	0	0
1996–99	North Sydney	94	3	0	0	12
2000–01	Northern Eagles	44	3	0	0	12
2002–03	Wests Tigers	29	0	0	0	0
2003–06	London Broncos	64	2	0	0	8
2006–07	Whitehaven R.L.F.C.	24	0	0	0	0
	Total	260	8	0	0	32
- Source: As of 24 January 2019
- Relatives: Craig Trindall (brother); Darrell Trindall (brother)

Steve Trindall born 23 April 1973 in Wee Waa, New South Wales, Australia is a former professional rugby league footballer who played in the 1990s and 2000s. Trindall's position of choice is as a prop.

He played for the Canberra Raiders, the North Sydney Bears, the Northern Eagles and the Wests Tigers in Australia. In the Super League he played for the London Broncos and also played for Whitehaven.

== Playing career ==
Trindall made his first grade debut for Canberra in Round 20 1993 against Cronulla. In 1996, Trindall joined North Sydney and became a regular starter in the team. Trindall played in North Sydney's preliminary final loss against St George.

In 1997, Trindall made 25 appearances as Norths reached the preliminary final against Newcastle. A try by Norths player Michael Buettner levelled the scores at 12-12 and halfback Jason Taylor had the chance to kick a winning goal with 4 minutes left to play. A normally reliable kicker, Taylor missed the goal that would have sent Norths into their first grade final since 1943. In the following minutes, Newcastle kicked a field goal and scored a late try to win the match 17–12. This was Norths 4th preliminary final defeat in 7 years.

In 1998, Norths finished 5th but were eliminated from the finals series after losing to Parramatta and Canterbury. In 1999, Trindall was a member of The North Sydney side which played its final ever first grade game against The North Queensland Cowboys in Townsville.

After Norths merged with arch rivals Manly to form the Northern Eagles, Trindall was one of the Norths players signed to join the new team. Trindall made 44 appearances for the club before departing the team to join Wests Tigers. Trindall then went on to play with Wests for 2 seasons before leaving the club in 2003 to join the London Broncos.

Trindall played 64 times for London between 2003 and 2006 before finishing his career with Whitehaven.
