= Evarn Tuimavave =

New Zealand international rugby player (born 1984)

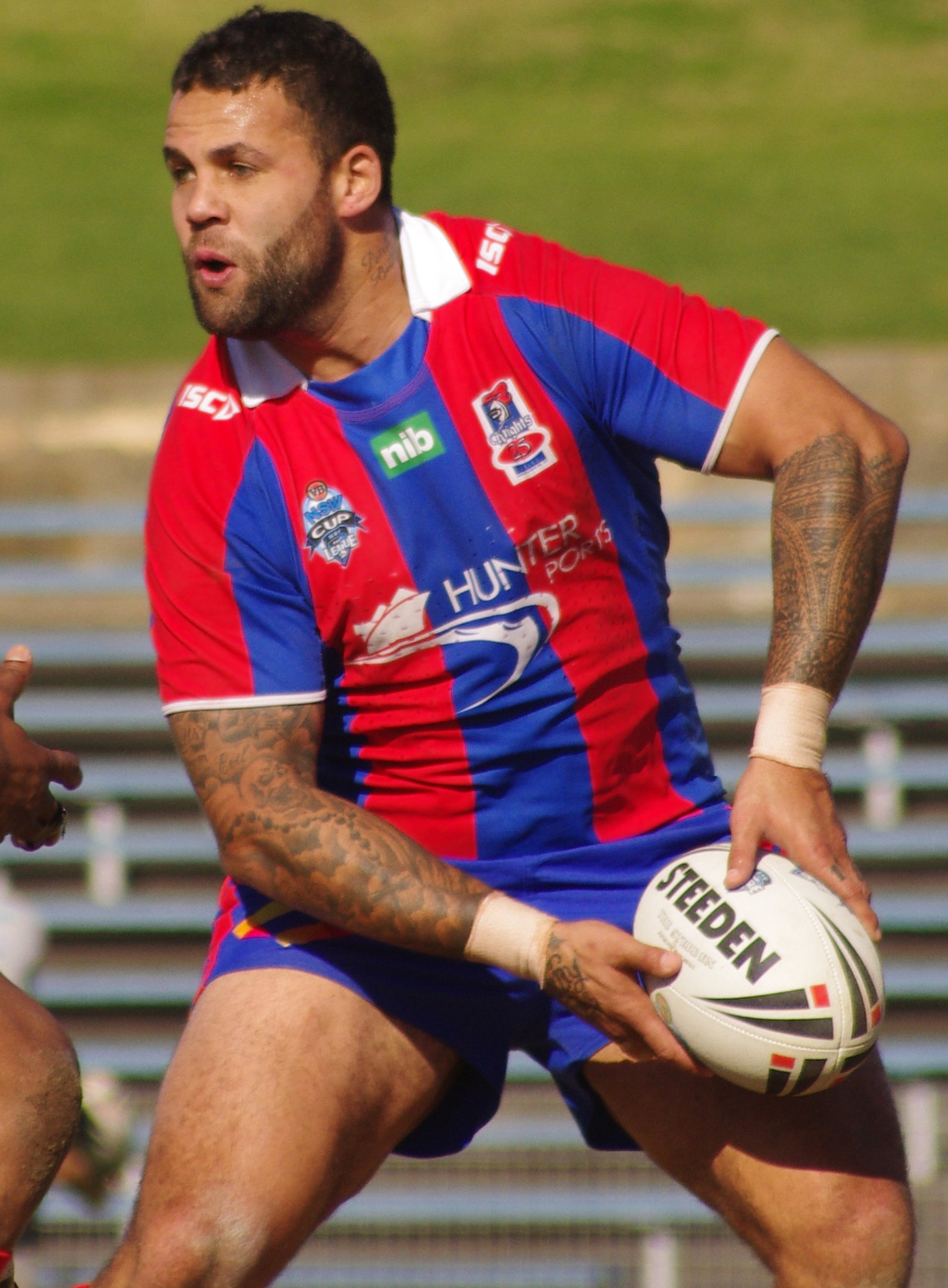

Personal information
- Born: 28 June 1984 (age 42) Auckland, New Zealand

Playing information
- Height: 184 cm (6 ft 0 in)
- Weight: 105 kg (16 st 7 lb)
- Position: Prop
Club
Years	Team	Pld	T	G	FG	P
2002–09	New Zealand Warriors	105	9	1	0	38
2010–12	Newcastle Knights	33	2	0	0	8
2013	Hull Kingston Rovers	23	2	0	0	8
	Total	161	13	1	0	54
Representative
Years	Team	Pld	T	G	FG	P
2008	New Zealand	1	0	0	0	0
- Relatives: Tony Tuimavave (uncle); Paddy Tuimavave (uncle); Carlos Tuimavave (cousin)

Evarn Tuimavave (born 28 June 1984) is a New Zealand former professional rugby league footballer who played as a prop.

== Playing career ==
Born in Auckland, New Zealand, Tuimavave played his junior football for the Pt Chev Pirates, Richmond Rovers and Bartercard Cup team, Marist Richmond Brothers while being educated at Mount Roskill Grammar School and St Paul's College, which is noted for its rugby league teams. In 2002, he followed his uncle Tony's footsteps in joining National Rugby League team, the New Zealand Warriors. In Round 25 of the 2002 NRL season he made his NRL début against the Northern Eagles. In early 2003, he was dropped and spent the next twelve months in the Bartercard Cup. In 2007, he played for the Auckland Lions in the NSWRL Premier League. He then cemented his place in the top 25-man squad and was regularly named on the bench in 2008. In 2009, Tuimavave suffered a serious injury and did not play a first-grade game until Round 21. His contract was not renewed for the 2010 season.

In September 2009, Tuimavave signed a 2-year contract with the Newcastle Knights starting in 2010. He tore his Achilles tendon in Round 10 of the 2010 NRL season which ruled him out for the rest of year. Tuimavave made his return in Round 1 of the 2011 NRL season and went on to play 20 games that season. He then extended his stay into 2012.

On 25 July 2012, Tuimavave signed a 2-year contract with English Super League club, Hull Kingston Rovers starting in 2013. He was released from his contract a year early on compassionate grounds.

== Representative career ==
In 2002, Tuimavave was named in the Junior Kiwis squad that played in two matches against touring Australian teams.

In 2006, he was selected for New Zealand A, who played and won a match against an Australian Invitational side.

He was first named in the New Zealand national rugby league team squad in 2007 when he was 18th man for the ANZAC day test. In 2008 he was named in the training squads for both the New Zealand and Samoan World Cup teams. After initially not being selected for the 24-man Kiwis squad he was called up as a replacement for the injured Jeff Lima and made his test début against England.

== Personal life ==
Tuimavave is from a famous rugby league family, two of his uncles, Tony and Paddy both played for the New Zealand national rugby league team and his father played in the Auckland Rugby League Fox Memorial competition. His cousin, Carlos Tuimavave, is currently playing for Hull FC.

In Tuimavave's early teens, he was an Auckland representative in tennis.
