= Danny Bampton =

Australian rugby league footballer

Personal information
- Full name: Danny Bampton
- Born: 6 March 1980 (age 46) Brisbane, Queensland, Australia
- Height: 187 cm (6 ft 2 in)
- Weight: 90 kg (14 st 2 lb)

Playing information
- Position: Centre
Club
Years	Team	Pld	T	G	FG	P
1998–00	Brisbane Broncos	10	1	0	0	4
- Source: As of 1 February 2019

Danny Bampton (born 6 March 1980) is an Australian former professional rugby league footballer who played in the 1990s and 2000s for the Brisbane Broncos in the Australian National Rugby League competition. He primarily played at centre.
