= Darrell Trindall =

Australian rugby league footballer

Personal information
- Born: 16 February 1972 (age 54) Narrabri, New South Wales, Australia

Playing information
- Height: 172 cm (5 ft 8 in)
- Weight: 72 kg (11 st 5 lb)
- Position: Five-eighth, Halfback, Fullback
Club
Years	Team	Pld	T	G	FG	P
1990–99	South Sydney	150	44	73	6	328
1994–95	Sheffield Eagles	19	0	3	0	6
2000	St Helens	2	0	0	0	0
2001–02	Canterbury Bulldogs	21	4	0	0	16
	Total	192	48	76	6	350
Representative
Years	Team	Pld	T	G	FG	P
1992	Indigenous All Stars	6
- Relatives: Craig Trindall (brother); Steve Trindall (brother)

Darrell Wayne 'Tricky' Trindall (born 16 February 1972) is an Australian former rugby league footballer who played in the 1990s and 2000s.

== Background ==
Trindall was born in Narrabri, New South Wales, Australia.

== Career ==
He played for the South Sydney Rabbitohs for ten seasons between 1990 and 1999, Canterbury Bulldogs for two seasons between 2001 and 2002, Sheffield Eagles in 1994 and St Helens in 2000 as a half-back, five-eighth and fullback. He rose through the ranks to become club captain at South Sydney Rabbitohs in 1997–98. He scored 328 points and played 150 first grade games with the Rabbitohs before finishing his NRL career at the Canterbury Bulldogs.

He played for the Australian Aboriginal team at the 1992 Pacific Cup, being named in the team of the tournament.

In 2003, Trindall played for one season in the Intrust Super Premiership NSW for Newtown.

== Personal life ==
In August 2002, Trindall was charged with assault occasioning actual bodily harm and high-range drink driving after an alleged assault in the Bulldogs club car park, which left a 36-year-old woman in hospital with head injuries.

In August 2003, Trindall pleaded guilty to indecently assaulting a long time friend at a pub in Sydney's CBD. Trindall allegedly punched the woman in the face three times and held her in a headlock four times. He then said "I'm a first grade footballer. Who are they going to believe, you or me?". Trindall later received a 12-month suspended jail sentence for the attack.

In April 2012, Trindall pleaded not guilty to assaulting a police officer in January 2012. The assault allegedly took place in Sydney's Eastern Suburbs.

In 2020, Trindall was remanded on charges of common assault, stalking or intimidating in a domestic violence context, and two counts of assault occasioning bodily harm.
