= Tony Tuimavave =

Former NZ & Samoa international rugby league footballer

Personal information
- Full name: Antonio Emil Tuimavave
- Born: 24 April 1969 (age 57) Apia, Western Samoa

Playing information
- Height: 182 cm (6 ft 0 in)
- Weight: 95 kg (14 st 13 lb)
- Position: Prop, Lock
Club
Years	Team	Pld	T	G	FG	P
	Mount Albert Lions
	Northcote Tigers
1991–92	Sheffield Eagles	21	13	0	2	54
1994	Waitakere City	6	0	0	1	1
1995–00	Auckland Warriors	78	9	0	0	36
	Total	105	22	0	3	91
Representative
Years	Team	Pld	T	G	FG	P
1988–94	Auckland
1995	New Zealand	1	0	0	0	0
1990–97	Western Samoa	2	0	0	0	0
- Relatives: Paddy Tuimavave (brother); Paki Tuimavave (brother); Carlos Tuimavave (nephew); Evarn Tuimavave (nephew); Antonio Winterstein (nephew)

Antonio (Tony) Emil Tuimavave (born 24 April 1969) is a former professional rugby league footballer who played in the 1990s and 2000s, who was the head coach of the Ponsonby Ponies from 2010, primarily as a prop also as a lock. He was nicknamed The Chief because he is a chief back in his native Samoa.

== Playing career ==
Until the formation of the Auckland Warriors, Tony remained largely unheard off outside of the Auckland Scene. He played for the Mt Albert Lions and Northcote Tigers in the Auckland Rugby League competition. He was an Auckland rep from 1988 to 1994 playing over 30 matches for the province. In 1994 he played for the Waitakere City Raiders in the Lion Red Cup, and captained the Western Samoa tour of New Zealand.

He was in the inaugural Warriors side in 1995 and remained a fixture in the squad until his retirement in 2000. He was the last of the inaugural team to leave the club.

== Representative career ==
A Kiwi in 1995, Tuimavave also represented Western Samoa in the 1990 Pacific Cup, 1992 Pacific Cup, and at the 1995 World Cup.

== Coaching career ==
In 2010, he was named the head coach of the Ponsonby Ponies in the Auckland Rugby League competition.

== Later years ==
After his retirement from rugby league he flirted with becoming a professional boxer, winning his only professional fight in 2001. He returned to play for the Mt Albert Lions in the Bartercard Cup in 2004.

He now runs a jet ski rental business in Apia, Western Samoa, and is involved in the grassroots of Samoan rugby league.

== Family ==
The Tuimavave family has a large presence in Auckland rugby league. He is Uncle to current players Evarn Tuimavave (Newcastle Knights), Carlos Tuimavave (Warriors) and Antonio Winterstein (Cowboys) Chanel Tuimavave played alongside Tony for the Mt Albert Lions in the Bartercard Cup, Paddy Tuimavave played for the New Zealand national rugby league team and Western Samoa and Paki Tuimavave also represented Western Samoa.
