= James Pickering (rugby league) =

Former Fiji international rugby league footballer

Personal information
- Full name: James Pickering
- Born: 11 December 1966 (age 58); Fiji

Playing information
- Position: Prop
Club
Years	Team	Pld	T	G	FG	P
	Richmond Bulldogs
1994–95	Workington Town	28	1	0	0	4
1995–97	Canterbury-Bankstown	9	1	0	0	4
1998	Eastern Suburbs	14	0	0	0	0
1999	Castleford Tigers	20	0	0	0	0
2000	Canterbury-Bankstown	1	0	0	0	0
	Total	72	2	0	0	8
Representative
Years	Team	Pld	T	G	FG	P
1991–92	Auckland
1992–94	Fiji	3	1	0	0	4

James Pickering (born 11 December 1966) is a Fijian former professional rugby league footballer who played in the 1990s and 2000s, and coached in the 2000s. He represented Fiji and Auckland. He made his name during three wonderfully successful years at the English club Workington Town, where his performances were so impressive he is now in the club's Hall of Fame.

== Background ==
Pickering was born in Fiji, he was a pupil at Onehunga High School, Auckland, New Zealand.

== Playing career ==
A Richmond junior, Pickering played for Auckland, and had a New Zealand national rugby league team trial in 1992 however was not selected. He played for Fiji at the 1992 Pacific Cup.

He made his first grade début for Workington Town in the 1992/93 English season in the old division 3 competition. He helped Town into second place behind Keighley Cougars, and to the final of the Divisional Premiership competition, when they were narrowly beaten by Featherstone Rovers, from the division above.

In 1993–94, Pickering was the driving force behind Workington Town doing the Division Two and Premiership double as they won the league in emphatic style, and beat London Crusaders at Old Trafford 30–22.

Back in the game's elite, Workington enjoyed an impressive 1994-95 campaign finishing ninth out of 16 and reaching the quarter-finals of the Challenge Cup. Once again, Pickering was the side's shining light with even the finest prop forwards in the game struggling to come to terms with the Fijian's swashbuckling style of play.

He then spent three seasons with the Canterbury Bulldogs, playing in nine first grade matches before a horrid run of injuries practically ended his career.

Pickering then spent a season each at Sydney City and Castleford Tigers before returning to the Canterbury Bulldogs for the 2000 season.

== Later years ==
In 2006 Pickering was made the chairman of the Australian Fijian Rugby League. As of 2011 he currently still serves in this position.

In 2008, when Pickering was serving as the player-coach of the Australian Fijians side, he was inducted into the Workington Town hall of fame.

Pickering has previously served as the Sydney Roosters under-20s coach and the Canterbury Bulldogs under-18s coach.
