= Paddy Tuimavave =

New Zealand & Samoa international rugby league footballer

Personal information
- Full name: Paddy Tuimavave
- Born: 4 April 1964 (age 62)
- Height: 183 cm (6 ft 0 in)
- Weight: 109 kg (17 st 2 lb)

Playing information
- Position: Fullback, Centre
Club
| Years | Team | Pld | T | G | FG | P |
|---|---|---|---|---|---|---|
| | Mount Albert Lions |
| | Northcote Tigers |
| 1985–86 | Swinton |
| 1987–88 | Leigh | 6 | 1 | 0 | 0 | 4 |
| 1990–91 | Workington Town |
| | Total | 6 | 1 | 0 | 0 | 4 |
Representative
| Years | Team | Pld | T | G | FG | P |
| | Auckland |
| 1986–95 | Western Samoa |
| 1990 | New Zealand | 2 | 0 | 0 | 0 | 0 |

Paddy Tuimavave is a former professional rugby league footballer who played as a fullback in the 1980s and 1990s and represented both New Zealand and Western Samoa.

== Background ==
He is related to Evarn and Tony, who have both also played for the New Zealand national rugby league team, and Paki Tuimavave who also represented Western Samoa.

== Playing career ==
A Mount Albert Lions and Northcote Tigers player in the Auckland Rugby League competition,. Tuimavave was part of the 1988 Auckland side that defeated Great Britain 30–14 at Carlaw Park. Tuimavave scored a try in that match. In 1991 Tuimavave played for Canterbury in the Lion Red Showdown competition against Auckland, Western Suburbs and North Sydney.

Tuimavave also played for Leigh and Workington Town in England.

== Representative career ==
Tuimavave represented New Zealand in two tests against Papua New Guinea in 1990. He also represented Samoa in the 1986, 1988 and 1992 Pacific Cups and was named in the 1986 and 1992 team of the tournament selections.
