= 2000 Bulldogs RLFC season =

Canterbury-Bankstown Bulldogs
- 2001 season
- Head coach: Steve Folkes
- Captain: Darren Britt 22 games and Ricky Stuart 4 games
- Top try scorer: Club: Hazem El Masri (10)
- Top points scorer: Club: Daryl Halligan (204)
- Highest home attendance: 21,609 v St George Illawarra Dragons, round 25
- Lowest home attendance: 8,654 v North Queensland Cowboys, round 22
- Average home attendance: 12,886

The 2000 Bulldogs RLFC season was the 66th in the club's history. Coached by Steve Folkes and captained by Darren Britt, they competed in the National Rugby League's 2000 Telstra Premiership, finishing the regular season 11th.

== Squad movement ==
=== Gains ===
Player	Signed from	Until end of
Shane Perry	Western Suburbs Magpies	2001
James Pickering	Castleford Tigers	2000
Nathan Sologinkin	Canberra Raiders	2002

=== Debuts ===
- Braith Anasta
- Willie Mason
- Brent Sherwin

=== Losses ===
Player	Signed to	Until end of
Robert Relf	North Queensland Cowboys	2001

=== Left club/did not play in 2000 ===
- Barry Berrigan

== See also ==
- List of Canterbury-Bankstown Bulldogs seasons
