= 2000 Rugby League World Cup Group C =

Group C of the 2000 Rugby League World Cup is one of the four groups in the 2000 Rugby League World Cup.

== Standings ==
Pos	Team	Pld	W	D	L	PF	PA	PD	Pts	Qualification
1	Papua New Guinea	3	3	0	0	69	42	+27	6	Advance to knockout stage
2	France	3	2	0	1	104	37	+67	4	Advance to knockout stage
3	Tonga	3	1	0	2	96	76	+20	2	
4	South Africa	3	0	0	3	24	138	−114	0	

Source: Rugby League Project

== Matches ==
=== Papua New Guinea vs France ===
28 October 2000

Papua New Guinea	23–20	France
Tries: Bai, Krewanty, Buko, Lam. Goals: Buko, Wilshere 2. Drop Goals: Lam.		Tries: Benausse, Dekkiche, Hechiche 2. Goals: Banquet 2.

Charlety Stadium, Paris
Attendance: 7,498
Referee: Steve Ganson

France
1. Freddie Banquet, 2. Yacine Dekkiche, 3. Cassin, 4. Dulac, 5. Patrice Benausse, 6. Laurent Frayssinous, 7. Devecchi
8. Rachid Hechiche, 9. Wulf, 10. Teixido, 11. Guisset, 12. Tallec, 13. Jampy.
Substitutes: El Khalouki, Carrasco, Sands, Despin.

Papua New Guinea
1. David Buko, 2. John Wiltshere, 3. Aila, 4. Songoro, 5. Marcus Bai, 6. Stanley Gene, 7. Adrian Lam
8. Kahl, 9. Marum, 10. Solbat, 11. Naawi, 12. Mamando, 13. O'Reilly.
Substitutes: Mark Mom, Alex Krewanty, Norman, Mondo.

This was the first match of a double-header in Paris for the opening round.

=== Tonga vs South Africa ===
28 October 2000

Tonga	66–18	South Africa
Try: Vaikona 5' (c); D. Mann 7' (c); Vaikona 20' (c); Liava'a ?' (m); Masella ?' (m); Moala ?' (m); E. Mann 44' (m); Vaikona 46' (m); Lomi 51' (c); Vaikona 55' (c); Kaufusi ?' (?); D. Mann ?' (?); Mason ?' (?); Con: Moala (4/9); Mason (1/1)		Try: Breytenbach 17' (m); Barnard ?' (c); Best ?' (c); Con: ? (0/1); Bloem (2/2); Pen: O'Shea (1/1)

Charlety Stadium, Paris
Attendance: 7,498
Referee: Darren Hopewell

This match formed the second part of the opening round double-header in Paris.

Tonga:
1. Paul Koloi, 2. Fifita Moala, 3. Tevita Vaikona, 4. G. Wolfgramm, 5. Lipina Kaufusi, 6. Howlett, 7. W. Wolfgramm
8. Martin Masella (c), 9. Esau Mann, 10. Talite Liava'a, 11. Willie Mason, 12. Talou, 13. Duane Mann.
Substitutes: David Fisi'iahi, Manu, Nelson Lomi, Kite.

South Africa:
1. Tim O'Shea, 2. Brian Best, 3. Leon Barnard, 4. Johnson, 5. Dames, 6. Conrad Breytenbach, 7. Jamie Bloem
8. Booysen, 9. Skelton, 10. Powell, 11. Rutgerson, 12. De Villiers, 13. Erasmus.
Substitutes: Jennings, Nel, Mulder, Cloete.
Coach: Paul Matete

Before the match a statue honouring French rugby league legend, Puig Aubert was unveiled by the French Rugby League Federation at the stadium.

=== France vs Tonga ===
1 November 2000

France	28–8	Tonga
Try: Banquet ?' (c); Sirvent ?' (c); Dulac 66' (m); Garcia ?' (c); Jampy ?' (c); Con: Banquet (4/5); Pen: Banquet (0/2)		Try: D. Fisi'iahi ?' (m); P. Fisi'iahi 60' (m); Con: Moala (0/2)

Stade d'Albert Domec, Carcassonne
Attendance: 10,288
Referee: Steve Clark

France:
1. Freddie Banquet, 2. Jean-Marc Garcia, 3. Cassin, 4. Arnaud Dulac, 5. Claude Sirvent, 6. Fabien Devecchi, 7. Rinaldi
8. Hechiche, 9. Wulf, 10. Sands, 11. Jerome Guisset, 12. Tallec, 13. Pascal Jampy.
Substitutes: Despin, Carrasco, Sort, Teixido.

Tonga:
1. Paul Koloi, 2. Fifita Moala, 3. Vaikona, 4. David Fisi'iahi, 5. L. Kaufusi, 6. Howlett,
7. Nuko Hifo, 8. Martin Masella (c), 9. E. Mann, 10. Liava'a, 11. Willie Mason, 21. Kite, 13. D. Mann.
Substitutes: Paul Fisi'iahi, Manu, Nelson Lomi, A. Masella.

Sin Bin: Lomi (25") for flopping.

=== Papua New Guinea vs South Africa ===
2 November 2000

Papua New Guinea	16–0	South Africa
Try: Aila 25' (c); Wilshere 31' (c); Paiyo 52' (m); Con: Wilshere (2/3)

Stadium de Toulouse, Toulouse
Attendance: 4,313
Referee: Darren Hopewell

=== France vs South Africa ===
5 November 2000

France	56–6	South Africa
Try: Cassin 8' (c); Banquet 21' (c); Cassin 35' (c); Guisset 38' (c); Jampy ?' (c); Jampy ?' (c); Jampy 53' (c); Sirvent ?' (c); Tallec ?' (c); Con: Banquet (9/9); Pen: Banquet (1/1) 18'		Try: De Villiers ?' (m); Con: ? (0/1); Pen: Bloem (1/1) ?'

Stadium Municipal d'Albi, Albi
Attendance: 7,969
Referee: Steve Clark

=== Papua New Guinea vs Tonga ===
6 November 2000

Papua New Guinea	30–22	Tonga
Try: Mondo 19' (c); Gene 23' (m); Buko 35' (c); Karl ?' (m); Gene ?' (c); Con: Wiltshere (3/5); Pen: Wiltshere (2/2) 5', 42'		Try: Moala 10' (c); Mason 39' (c); Moala ?' (m); Vaikona ?' (m); Con: Moala (2/2); Pen: Moala (1/1) 7'

Saint-Esteve, Perpignan
Attendance: 3,666
Referee: Steve Ganson
