= 2000 Rugby League World Cup Group B =

Group B of the 2000 Rugby League World Cup is one of the four groups in the 2000 Rugby League World Cup.

== Standings ==
Pos	Team	Pld	W	D	L	PF	PA	PD	Pts	Qualification
1	New Zealand	3	3	0	0	206	28	+178	6	Advance to knockout stage
2	Wales	3	2	0	1	80	86	−6	4	Advance to knockout stage
3	Lebanon	3	0	1	2	44	110	−66	1	
4	Cook Islands	3	0	1	2	38	144	−106	1	

Source: Rugby League Project

== Matches ==
=== New Zealand vs Lebanon ===
29 October 2000

New Zealand	64–0	Lebanon
Try: Jones (2), Carroll (2), Vainikolo (2), Talau (2), Barnett (2), Swain, Jellick; Con: Jones (6), Paul (2)

Kingsholm Stadium, Gloucester
Attendance: 2,496
Referee: Bill Harrigan

New Zealand:
1. Richie Barnett (c), 2. Leslie Vainikolo, 3. Tonie Carroll, 4. Willie Talau, 5. Brian Jellick, 6. Henry Paul, 7. Stacey Jones
8. Smith, 9. Swain, 10. Pongia, 11. Logan Swann, 12. Kearney, 13. Ruben Wiki.
Substitutes: Joe Vagana, Robbie Paul, Rua, Cayless.
Coach:Frank Endacott

Lebanon:
1. Hazem El Masri (c), 2. Najarrin, 3. Katrib, 4. Touma, 5. H. Saleh, 6. Stanton, 7. Coorey
8. Maroon, 9. Semrani, 10. Elamad, 11. Chamoun, 12. Khoury, 13. Lichaa.
Substitutes: Salem, Nohra, Tamer, S. El Masri.

=== Wales vs Cook Islands ===
29 October 2000

Wales	38–6	Cook Islands
Try: Tassell (3), Jenkins, Briers, Cunningham; Con: Harris (6/6); Pen.: Harris (1/1)		Try: Temata; Con: Piakura (1/1)

Racecourse Ground, Wrexham
Attendance: 5,016
Referee: Thierry Alibert

Wales:
1. Paul Atcheson, 2. Paul Sterling, 3. Jason Critchley, 4. Kris Tassell, 5. Anthony Sullivan, 6. Iestyn Harris (c), 7. Lee Briers
8. Anthony Farrell, 9. Keiron Cunningham, 10. Dave Whittle, 11. Justin Morgan, 12. Mick Jenkins, 13. Dean Busby.
Substitutes: Ian Watson, Wes Davies, Paul Highton, Garreth Carvell.

Cook Islands:
1. Richard Piakura, 2. Tongia, 3. Steve Berryman, 4. Kevin Iro (c), 5. Karl Temata, 6. Bowen, 7. Joe
8. Tuakuru, 9. Clark, 10. Temu, 11. Kuru, 12. Pau, 13. Anthony Samuel.
Substitutes: Andersson, Lewis, Tere Glassie, Cook.

=== New Zealand vs Cook Islands ===
2 November 2000

New Zealand	84–10	Cook Islands
Try: Vaealiki (2), Paul (2), Barnett (2), Lavea (2), Lauiti'iti, Vainikolo, Wiki, Cayless, Pongia, Vagana, Puletua; Con: Lavea (12/15)		Try: Noovao; Iro; Con: Piakura (1/2)

Madejski Stadium, Reading
Attendance: 3,982
Referee: Tim Mander

=== Wales vs Lebanon ===
2 November 2000

Wales	24–22	Lebanon
Try: Harris (2), Davies, Cunningham, Sterling; Con: Harris (2/5)		Try: Saleh (2), Coorey; El Masri; Con: El Masri (3/4)

Stradey Park, Llanelli
Attendance: 1,497
Referee: David Pakieto

=== Cook Islands vs Lebanon ===
5 November 2000

Cook Islands	22–22	Lebanon
Try: Berryman (2), Toa, Joe; Con: Berryman (2); Piakura		Try: El Masri (2), Touma, Saleh; Con: El Masri (3/4)

Millennium Stadium, Cardiff
Attendance: 17,612
Referee: Bill Shrimpton

=== Wales vs New Zealand ===
5 November 2000

Wales	18–58	New Zealand
Try: Briers, Atcheson, Farrell; Con: Harris (3/3)		Try: Vainikolo (3), Barnett (2), Lauiti'iti, Wiki, Vagana, Paul, Talau, Carroll; Con: Paul (5); Lavea (2)

Millennium Stadium, Cardiff
Attendance: 17,612
Referee: Russell Smith
