= 2000 Rugby League World Cup knockout stage =

Rugby league tournament stage

The 2000 Rugby League World Cup knockout stage took place after the group stage of the 2000 Rugby League World Cup and culminated in the 2000 Rugby League World Cup final. The quarter-finals consisted of eight teams; the top two teams from each group; Group A, Group B, Group C and Group D.

== Bracket ==
Quarter-finals
11 November – Leeds
Ireland	16
England	26
12 November – Castleford
New Zealand	54
France	6
11 November – Watford
Australia	66
Samoa	10
12 November – Widnes
Papua New Guinea	8
Wales	22

Semi-finals
18 November – Bolton
England	6
New Zealand	49
19 November – Huddersfield
Australia	46
Wales	22

Final
25 November – Manchester
New Zealand	12
Australia	40

== Quarter-finals ==
=== Quarter-final 1: Australia vs Samoa ===
11 November 2000

Australia	66–10	Samoa
	Summary

Vicarage Road, Watford
Attendance: 5,404
Referee: Stuart Cummings (England)

=== Quarter-final 2: England vs Ireland ===
11 November 2000
18:30 GMT (UTC±00:00)

England	26–16	Ireland
	Summary

Headingley Rugby Stadium, Leeds
Attendance: 15,405
Referee: Tim Mander (Australia)

England:
1. Paul Wellens, 2. Chev Walker, 3. Kris Radlinski, 4. Keith Senior, 5. Darren Rogers, 6. Sean Long, 7. Paul Deacon
8. Stuart Fielden, 9. Paul Rowley, 10. Paul Anderson, 11. Adrian Morley, 12. Mike Forshaw, 13. Andy Farrell.
Substitutes: 14. Tony Smith, 15. Scott Naylor, 16. Jamie Peacock, 17. Harvey Howard .
Coach: John Kear

Ireland
1. Steve Prescott, 2. Brian Carney, 3. Michael Withers, 4. Michael Eagar, 5. Mark Forster, 6. Tommy Martyn, 7. Ryan Sheridan
8. Terry O'Connor, 9. Danny Williams, 10. Barrie McDermott, 11. Chris Joynt, 12. Kevin Campion, 13. Luke Ricketson
Substitutes: Clinch, Mathiou, Barnhill, Southern. Coach: Steve O'Neill Andy Kelly

=== Quarter-final 3: New Zealand vs France ===
12 November 2000

New Zealand	54–6	France
	Summary

Mend-a-Hose Jungle, Castleford
Attendance: 5,158
Referee: Bill Harrigan (Australia)

=== Quarter-final 4: Wales vs Papua New Guinea ===
12 November 2000

Wales	22–8	Papua New Guinea
	Summary

Auto Quest Stadium, Widnes
Attendance: 5,211
Referee: David Pakieto (New Zealand)

== Semi-finals ==
=== Semi-final 1: New Zealand vs England ===
This was the England rugby league team's biggest ever loss. By winning this match, New Zealand had again equaled their record for consecutive victories with five.

18 November 2000

New Zealand	49–6	England
	Summary

Reebok Stadium, Bolton
Attendance: 16,032
Referee: Tim Mander (Australia)
Player of the Match: Stephen Kearney (New Zealand)

=== Semi-final 2: Australia vs Wales ===
Wales became the first team in 12 months to score more than two tries against Australia.

19 November 2000

Australia	46–22	Wales
	Summary

McAlpine Stadium, Huddersfield
Attendance: 8,114
Referee: Russell Smith (England)

== Final ==
2000 Rugby League World Cup Final

Saturday, 25 November
15:00 GMT (UTC±00:00)

Australia	40 – 12	New Zealand
Tries: 7 Sailor 66', 69'; Gidley 26'; Hindmarsh 46'; Lockyer 53'; Fittler 74'; Barrett 76'; Goals: 6 Rogers (6/7)	1st: 6–0; 2nd: 34–12; Report	Tries: 2 Vainikolo 50'; Carroll 57'; Goals: 2 H. Paul (2/2)

Old Trafford, Manchester
Attendance: 44,329
Referee: Stuart Cummings (England)
Video referee: Gerry Kershaw
Player of the Match: Wendell Sailor
