= 2000 Rugby League World Cup final =

Australia	New Zealand
(ARL)	(NZRL)
40	12
	1	2	Total
AUS	6	34	40
NZL	0	12	12
- Date: 25 November 2000
- Stadium: Old Trafford
- Location: Manchester, England
- Referee: Stuart Cummings (England)
- Attendance: 44,329

Broadcast partners
- Broadcasters: Sky Sports (United Kingdom) Nine Network (Australia)
- Commentators: Eddie Hemmings (Sky); Mike Stephenson (Sky); Andrew Voss (Nine); Phil Gould (Nine); Peter Sterling (Nine)

The 2000 Rugby League World Cup final was the conclusive game of the 2000 Rugby League World Cup tournament and was played between Australia and New Zealand on November 25, 2000, at Old Trafford, Trafford, Greater Manchester, England. The men's final was held one day after the final of the inaugural 2000 Women's Rugby League World Cup.

== Background ==
The 2000 Rugby League World Cup was the twelfth staging of the Rugby League World Cup since its inauguration in 1954, and the first since the 1995 tournament. The tournament was held in the United Kingdom, Ireland and France from 28 October, culminating in the final between Australia and New Zealand on 25 November.

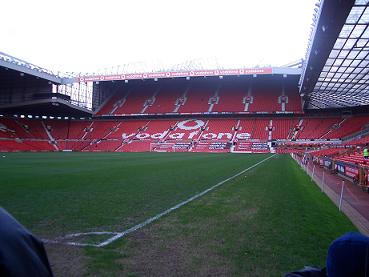
Old Trafford in Manchester hosted the World Cup final

=== Australia ===
Scores and results list Australia's points tally first.

Opposing Team	For	Against	Date	Venue	Attendance	Stage
England	22	2	28 October	Twickenham Stadium, London	33,758	Group Stage
Fiji	66	8	1 November	Gateshead International Stadium, Gateshead	4,197	Group Stage
Russia	110	4	4 November	The Boulevard, Hull	3,044	Group Stage
Samoa	66	10	11 November	Vicarage Road, Watford	5,404	Quarter-final
Wales	46	22	19 November	McAlpine Stadium, Huddersfield	8,114	Semi-final

Australia were undefeated going into the final. Their 110–4 win over Russia set a new world record test match score.

=== New Zealand ===
Scores and results list New Zealand's points tally first.

Opposing Team	For	Against	Date	Venue	Attendance	Stage
Lebanon	64	0	29 October	Kingsholm Stadium, Gloucester	2,496	Group Stage
Cook Islands	84	10	2 November	Madejski Stadium, Reading	3,982	Group Stage
Wales	58	18	5 November	Millennium Stadium, Cardiff	17,612	Group Stage
France	56	4	12 November	The Jungle, Castleford	5,158	Quarter-final
England	49	6	18 November	Reebok Stadium, Bolton	16,032	Semi-final

Like Australia, New Zealand were also undefeated going into the Final

== Summary ==
In a high-scoring final at Old Trafford, the Kangaroos overwhelmed their Trans-Tasman opponents. Wendell Sailor scored two tries and Mat Rogers had a near-perfect afternoon with the boot as the Australians ran out 40–12 winners and were crowned world champions for a sixth successive time.

== Match details ==
New Zealand second rower Stephen Kearney became the most capped forward in New Zealand test match history playing in his 36th test.

2000 Rugby League World Cup Final

Saturday, 25 November
15:00 GMT (UTC±00:00)

Australia	40 – 12	New Zealand
Tries: 7 Sailor 66', 69'; Gidley 26'; Hindmarsh 46'; Lockyer 53'; Fittler 74'; Barrett 76'; Goals: 6 Rogers (6/7)	1st: 6–0; 2nd: 34–12; Report	Tries: 2 Vainikolo 50'; Carroll 57'; Goals: 2 H. Paul (2/2)

Old Trafford, Manchester
Attendance: 44,329
Referee: Stuart Cummings (England)
Video referee: Gerry Kershaw
Player of the Match: Wendell Sailor

Australia	New Zealand

Team details
Australia		Position	New Zealand
Name	Number	Position	Number	Name
Darren Lockyer	1	Fullback	1	Richie Barnett
Mat Rogers	2	Wing	2	Nigel Vagana
Adam MacDougall	3	Centre	3	Tonie Carroll
Matt Gidley	4	Centre	4	Willie Talau
Wendell Sailor	5	Wing	5	Lesley Vainikolo
Brad Fittler (c)	6	Stand off/Five eighth	6	Henry Paul
Brett Kimmorley	7	Scrum half/Half back	7	Stacey Jones
Shane Webcke	8	Prop forward	8	Craig Smith
Andrew Johns	9	Hooker	9	Richard Swain
Robbie Kearns	10	Prop forward	10	Quentin Pongia
Gorden Tallis	11	Second row	11	Matt Rua
Bryan Fletcher	12	Second row	12	Stephen Kearney
Scott Hill	13	Loose forward/Lock forward	13	Ruben Wiki
Trent Barrett	14	Interchange	14	Robbie Paul
Nathan Hindmarsh	15	Interchange	15	Joe Vagana
Darren Britt	16	Interchange	16	Nathan Cayless
Jason Stevens	17	Interchange	17	Logan Swann
Chris Anderson		Coach		Frank Endacott
RLP

=== First half ===
Australia stepped on the gas from the kick-off, tearing into New Zealand at every opportunity. But the Kiwi defence stood firm, although they almost conceded after 22 minutes. Sailor looked to have scored the first try of the game after a burst down the right wing only for video referee Gerry Kershaw to rule that Stephen Kearney had prevented the Brisbane Broncos player from grounding the ball. The look of disbelief on Sailor's face was there for everyone to see, but he clearly did not let the decision affect his game. Three minutes later, his grubber kick was pounced on by Matt Gidley, who beat Kearney to the touch down. Rogers, assuming the kicking duties in place of the injured Ryan Girdler, landed the conversion to open up a 6–0 lead. New Zealand had few opportunities to go on the offensive, although they finished the first half strongly. But it was the favourites Australia who looked in control and deservedly went into the break in front.

=== Second half ===
The start of the second half was held up by the appearance of a male streaker. When play finally got under way, the tackles were just as ferocious as ever, neither side giving an inch. However Australia gained the edge when Brad Fittler split the defence with a pass to Nathan Hindmarsh, who scored from close range, bringing the score to 10–0. Rogers converted to make it 12–0. New Zealand were not about to throw in the towel and hit back almost immediately. Lesley Vainikolo pounced on a loose ball to dive over on 49 minutes, although the decision was again made by the video referee. When Henry Paul landed the conversion, the deficit was back down to six points. Soon after, Australian Halfback, Brett Kimmorley, made a break down the right before feeding the ball inside to fullback Darren Lockyer, who crossed for another try. Rogers' third successful kick made it 18–6 to the defending champions. However, the Kiwis quickly struck back when Tonie Carroll beat several Australian defenders to score. Henry Paul's conversion made it 18–12.

New Zealand then made several crucial errors and Australia were able to capitalise. Sailor grabbed two tries in the space of five minutes to take his tally for the tournament to 10. The first of them came on 63 minutes courtesy of a reverse pass from Gidley. Rogers missed the second of the two quick conversions. Skipper Fittler then breached the New Zealand defence on 73 minutes to score his first try of the final which was converted by Rogers. Substitute Trent Barrett then finished the scoring, with a try that was converted by Rogers.
