= Jean-Emmanuel =

Jean-Emmanuel is a French compound given name, a combination of Jean and Emmanuel. Notable people with the name include:

- Jean-Emmanuel Cassin, French rugby football player
- Jean-Emmanuel Gilibert (1741-1814), French politician, botanist, freemason and medical doctor
- Jean-Emmanuel Effa Owona (born 1983), Cameroonian football player
