= Brian Best =

Brian Best may refer to:

- Brian Best (rugby league) (fl. 2000s), South African rugby league footballer
- Brian Best (politician) (born 1959), American businessman and politician
