= Ilyasov =

Ilyasov or Ilyasova is a Slavic surname. It may refer to

- Ersan İlyasova (born 1987), Turkish basketball player who currently plays for the Milwaukee Bucks (as of February 2019)
- Robert Ilyasov (born 1973), Russian rugby league player
- Yury Ilyasov (1926–2005), Soviet high jumper
