= Anthony Samuel =

Cook Island rugby league footballer

Playing information
- Height: 5 ft 10 in (178 cm)
- Position: Second-row, Lock
Club
Years	Team	Pld	T	G	FG	P
1997	Widnes Vikings	6	0	0	0	0
2000–02	Workington Town
	Total	6	0	0	0	0
Representative
Years	Team	Pld	T	G	FG	P
2000	Cook Islands	3	0	0	0	0

Anthony Samuel is a Cook Island former professional rugby league footballer who played in the 1990s and 2000s. He played at representative level for the Cook Islands, and at club level for the Widnes Vikings and Workington Town, as a second-row or loose forward.

== Playing career ==
Between 2000 and 2002 Samuel played for Workington Town in the Northern Ford Premiership.

He made an appearance for Workington Town in a 2010 testimonial match for Neil Frazer along with other former favourites such as Hitro Okesene.

== Representative career ==
Samuel won three caps for Cook Islands in the 2000 Rugby League World Cup.

== Note ==
Anthony Samuel's surname is occasionally misspelt with a trailing "s" as Samuels.
