= Makasini Richter =

Tonga international rugby league footballer

Personal information
- Full name: Makasini Richter
- Born: 21 June 1979 (age 46) Nukuʻalofa, Tonga
- Height: 1.93 m (6 ft 4 in)
- Weight: 102 kg (16 st 1 lb)

Playing information
- Position: Fullback, Wing
Club
| Years | Team | Pld | T | G | FG | P |
|---|---|---|---|---|---|---|
| 2001–02 | Wests Tigers | 24 | 10 | 0 | 0 | 40 |
| 2005 | Canterbury-Bankstown | 2 | 0 | 0 | 0 | 0 |
| | Total | 26 | 10 | 0 | 0 | 40 |
Representative
| Years | Team | Pld | T | G | FG | P |
| 2000–06 | Tonga | 10 | 9 | 0 | 0 | 5 |
- Source: As of 17 January 2019

Makasini Richter (born 21 June 1979) is a Tongan former professional rugby league footballer who previously played for the Canterbury-Bankstown Bulldogs and the Wests Tigers in the National Rugby League.

== Background ==
Richter was born in Nukuʻalofa, Tonga.

== Playing career ==
Richter scored ten tries in his 24 appearances for the Wests Tigers in 2001 and 2002, including two tries in his first-grade debut. Unfortunately, Richter played during a particularly dire period for the club, with just 4 of his 24 appearances being victories.

Joining Canterbury in 2004, Richter spent his first season in the club in reserve grade before injury disrupted is season. In 2005, Richter played 2 first grade games, and also scored 20 tries from his 20 appearances in the lower grade, surpassing the record set by Hasan Saleh.

In 2006, Richter represented the Tonga national rugby league team at the Pacific Cup. Earlier he had played for Tonga in the 2000 World Cup.

Earlier in his career, Richter was known as Jackson Kaufusi and Lipina Kaufusi.

== Career highlights ==
- FG debut: Wests Tigers v Canberra Raiders- 1 April 2001,(Rd 7
- Played twenty-six first grade games to date.
