= Joel Rullis =

Australian rugby league footballer

Personal information
- Born: Australia

Playing information
- Position: Lock
Representative
Years	Team	Pld	T	G	FG	P
2000–06	Russia	5	2	0	0	8

Joel Rullis is an Australian former professional rugby league footballer who represented Russia at the 2000 World Cup.

== Background ==
Rullis was born in Australia.

== Playing career ==
Rullis played for Russia in all three matches at the 2000 World Cup. In 2006 he played in two qualifying matches for the 2008 World Cup.

He has played for St George Dragons, St George Illawarra, West Tigers.
