= Shane Laloata =

Samoan rugby league and rugby union footballer

Personal information
- Born: 8 December 1977 (age 48)

Playing information
- Height: 201 cm (6 ft 7 in)
- Weight: 96 kg (15 st 2 lb)
- Position: Wing, Centre
Club
| Years | Team | Pld | T | G | FG | P |
|---|---|---|---|---|---|---|
| 2002 | St. George Illawarra | 11 | 4 | 0 | 1 | 16 |
Representative
| Years | Team | Pld | T | G | FG | P |
| 2000 | Samoa | 2 | 0 | 3 | 0 | 6 |

Shane Laloata (born 8 December 1977) is a professional rugby football player. He represented Samoa in rugby league.

== Rugby League career ==
=== Playing career ===
In 1999 Laloata was with the Newcastle Knights, and played in the NSWRL Premier League. He then moved to the North-Nelson Bay Marlins in the Newcastle Rugby League in 2000.

In 2002 Laloata played for the St. George Illawarra Dragons in the National Rugby League. He played for the Knights NSWRL Premier League side in 2003.

=== Representative career ===
Laloata played for Samoa in the 2000 World Cup.

== Rugby union career ==
By 2005 Laloata had switched to rugby union, and was playing for the Warringah Rugby Club in the Tooheys New Cup.

He moved to the Newcastle and Hunter Rugby Union competition in 2007, before heading north to Brisbane in 2008. However he returned to Newcastle in 2009, playing for Nelson Bay before switching to Merewether Carlton in 2010.
