= Scott Rhodes =

Scotland international rugby league player (born 1980)

Scott Barry Rhodes
Personal information
- Born: 21 June 1980 (age 46) York, England

Playing information
- Position: Stand-off, Scrum-half
Club
Years	Team	Pld	T	G	FG	P
2000(loan)	→ Hull FC	2	0	0	0	0
2001–02	Sheffield Eagles	54	16	0	0	64
2003	Dewsbury Rams	9	1	0	0	4
2003–08	York City Knights	113	34	0	1	137
	Total	178	51	0	1	205
Representative
Years	Team	Pld	T	G	FG	P
1999–01	Scotland	5	1	0	0	4

Scott Rhodes (born 21 June 1980) is a former Scotland international rugby league footballer who played as a stand-off or scrum-half in the 1990s and 2000s. He played at representative level in the 2000 Rugby League World Cup, and at club level for Heworth A.R.L.F.C., Leeds Rhinos (academy), Hull FC (loan), Sheffield Eagles, Dewsbury Rams and the York City Knights (captain). He retired from rugby league in October 2008.

== Background ==
Rhodes was born in York, England, and he is of Scottish descent through his father.

== Career ==
Rhodes started his rugby league career with junior club Heworth A.R.L.F.C., he was an academy player at Leeds Rhinos, and made two Super League appearances in 2000 while on loan at Hull FC, while at York City Knights during the 2004 National League Two season, coached by Richard Agar, he missed only one match, and scored 15-tries in 35-appearances, and was part of the 2005 National League Two title-winning squad coached by former Sheffield Eagles player Michael "Mick" Cook.
