= Russell Smith (referee) =

English rugby league match official

Personal information
- Born: 24 January 1964 (age 62) Castleford, West Riding of Yorkshire, England

Refereeing information
Years	Competition	Apps
1990–96	Rugby Football League Championship
1996–04	Super League
2005–06	National Rugby League
1993–05	Internationals

Russell Smith is a former rugby league referee who now administers and coaches match officials.

Smith controlled his first Rugby Football League Championship match on 9 September 1990, a match between Featherstone Rovers and Hull Kingston Rovers. His first international was between Australia and New Zealand on 20 June 1993.

He controlled matches in the 1995 and 2000 Rugby League World Cups, as well as five Challenge Cup finals. In 2004 he was named the international referee of the year.

He moved to Australia in 2005, becoming a National Rugby League referee. He retired at the end of the 2006 NRL season.

After retiring, Smith became a video official and, after a stint as the interim boss, acted as a senior advisor to the referees boss, Daniel Anderson. He was a match officials coach at the 2017 Rugby League World Cup.
