= Willie Talau =

NZ & Samoa international rugby league footballer

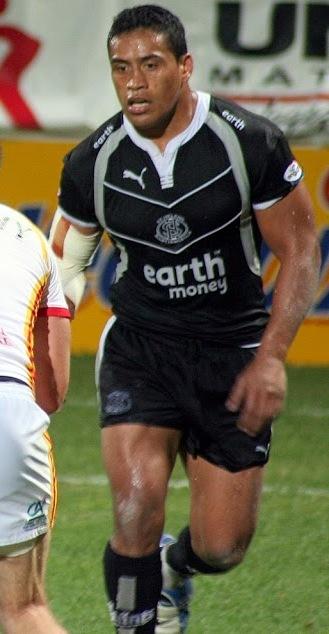

Personal information
- Full name: Viliamu Talau
- Born: 25 January 1976 (age 50) Apia, Samoa

Playing information
- Height: 5 ft 11.5 in (182 cm)
- Weight: 14 st 10 lb (93 kg)
- Position: Centre
Club
| Years | Team | Pld | T | G | FG | P |
|---|---|---|---|---|---|---|
| 1994–96 | Taranaki Rockets |
| 1998–03 | Canterbury Bulldogs | 101 | 38 | 0 | 0 | 152 |
| 2003–08 | St Helens | 149 | 65 | 0 | 0 | 260 |
| 2009–10 | Salford City Reds | 25 | 4 | 0 | 0 | 16 |
| | Total | 275 | 107 | 0 | 0 | 428 |
Representative
| Years | Team | Pld | T | G | FG | P |
| 1999–06 | New Zealand | 13 | 9 | 0 | 0 | 36 |
| 2007–08 | Samoa | 3 | 0 | 0 | 0 | 0 |
- Relatives: Tommy Talau (son)

Viliamu "Willie" Talau (born 25 January 1976) is a former professional rugby league footballer who played in the 1990s and 2000s. A Samoa and New Zealand international representative centre, he played in the National Rugby League (NRL) for the Canterbury-Bankstown Bulldogs, and in the Super League for St Helens, with whom he won the 2006 Super League Grand Final and the Challenge Cup on four occasions, and for the Salford City Reds.

== Background ==
Talau was born in Apia, Samoa.

== Club career ==
=== Early years ===
Talau attended Spotswood College. Talau played for the Taranaki Rockets in the Lion Red Cup. At 21, his father gave him a one-way ticket to Australia to try his luck playing league. While playing in the metropolitan Cup he was spotted by Canterbury, who signed him to play in the National Rugby League. In the 1994 Lion Red Cup Talau played in nine matches, scoring one try. He then played in all 22 matches for the Rockets in the 1995 season.

=== Canterbury-Bankstown Bulldogs ===
Talau made his debut for Canterbury in round 17 of the 1998 NRL season against South Sydney. Talau scored a try in Canterbury's famous 1998 preliminary final victory over arch-rivals Parramatta. Canterbury were down 18–2 with less than ten minutes of the match remaining but won the game in extra-time 32–20. He played in 101 National Rugby League games for the Canterbury club, scoring 38 tries, including one in the 1998 NRL Grand Final defeat against the Brisbane Broncos.

=== St Helens ===
He signed for St. Helens in late 2003. He made his Super League début on 24 August 2003 against Hull F.C. Talau scored two tries in the 2004 Challenge Cup Final, and participated in St Helens' 2006 treble, scoring in both the 2006 Challenge Cup Final and the 2006 Super League Grand Final. Talau scored 11 tries in 29 games during the 2006 season. As 2006 Super League champions, St Helens faced 2006 NRL Premiers the Brisbane Broncos in the 2007 World Club Challenge. Talau played at centre in the Saints' 18–14 victory. He played in 2008's Super League XIII Grand Final defeat by the Leeds Rhinos.

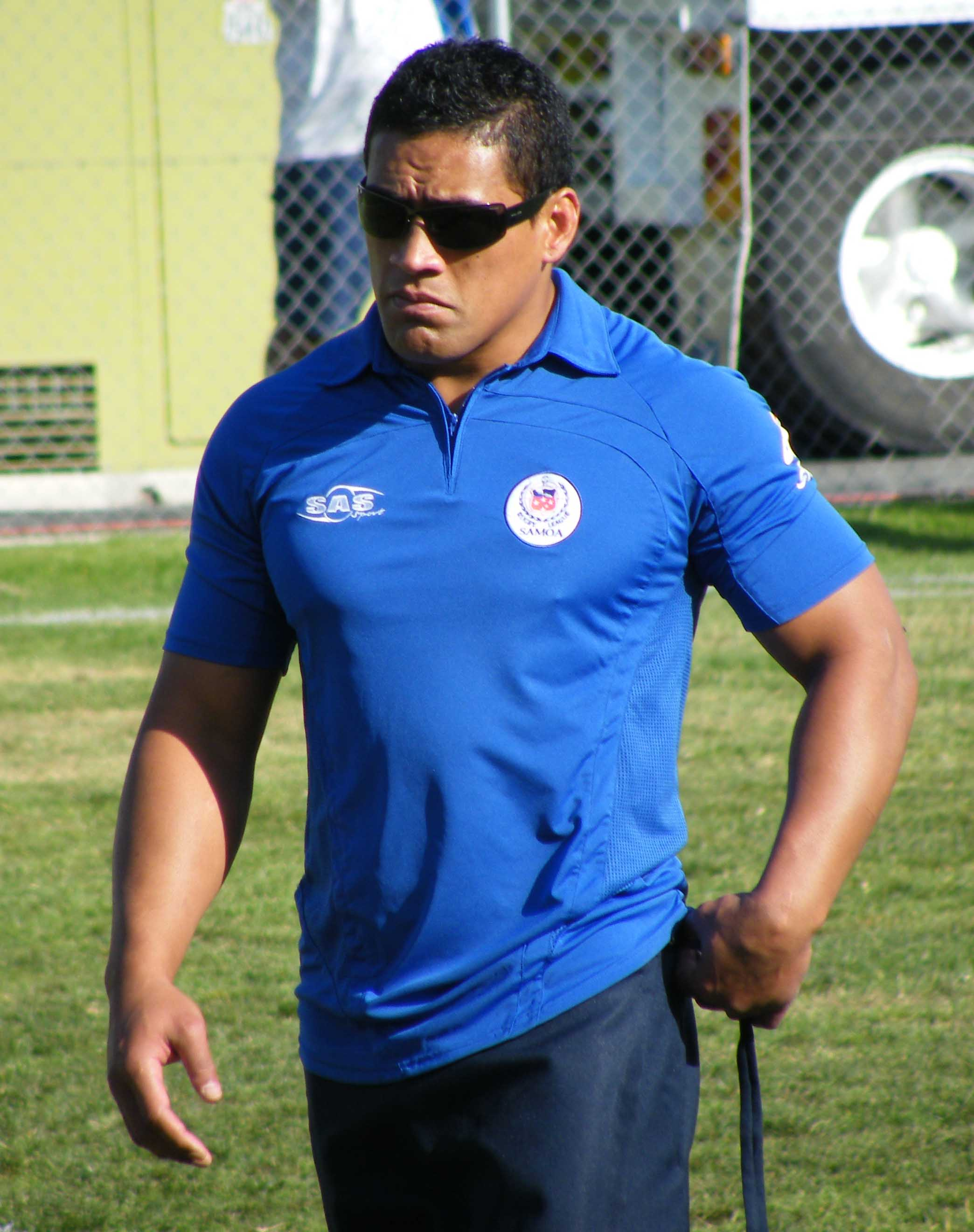
Talau with Samoa at the 2008 World Cup

=== Salford ===
Talau joined the Super League side the Salford City Reds for the start of the 2009 season. He retired from the sport at the end of the 2010 season.

== International career ==
=== New Zealand ===
He played for the Junior Kiwis as a youth.

Talau played in 13 games for the New Zealand national rugby league team from 1999 to 2006,

Talau was selected for the New Zealand team to compete in the end of season 1999 Rugby League Tri-Nations tournament. In the final against Australia he played at centre in the Kiwis' 22–20 loss.

He was selected in the Kiwis squad for the 2000 World Cup, playing in the World Cup final defeat to the Kangaroos at Old Trafford.

=== Samoa ===
In 2007 Talau switched allegiances to Samoa. The following year he represented Samoa in the 2008 Rugby League World Cup, playing two matches.

== Legacy ==
In 2008 he was named in the Taranaki Rugby League Team of the Century.
