= Robert Ilyasov =

Russian rugby league footballer (born 1973)

Robert Yurevich Ilyasov
Personal information
- Born: 8 October 1973 (age 52) Kazan, Russia

Playing information
- Position: Fullback
Club
| Years | Team | Pld | T | G | FG | P |
|---|---|---|---|---|---|---|
| 1995 | Strela Kazan |
| | RC Lokomotiv Moscow |
| | Total | 0 | 0 | 0 | 0 | 0 |
Representative
| Years | Team | Pld | T | G | FG | P |
| 2000 | Russia | | 1 | | | 4 |

Robert Yurevich Ilyasov (Russian: Роберт Юрьевич Ильясов; born 8 October 1973 in Kazan, Russia) is a Russian rugby league footballer who plays as a fullback for the Strela Kazan in the Championship of Russia competition. He was considered the leader of the backs in the Strela Kazan. He was also the captain of the Russian national rugby league team.

== Career ==
While at school, he attended the basketball, hockey, football, sambo and track and field sections. Ilyasov began his career for Strela Kazan, as a student at the Kazan Aviation Institute. He played for the Strela and Lokomotiv rugby league teams, from 1995 to 2001 he became the champion of the country five times in a row. In 1996, he played at the Student World Cup for the Russian national team, where he was voted the Player of the Tournament. He was offered to go to play abroad in the English clubs London Broncos and Warrington Wolves, but he refused first due to injury, and then for personal reasons.

For the Russian national side in 2000, Ilyasov played at the World Cup and was noted for an try in the match against Fiji. He is married to Oksana, and their daughters are Karina and Sofia. He refused to go to England, because he did not want to leave Oksana alone.
