= Michael Mondo =

PNG international rugby league footballer

Personal information
- Born: 12 November 1972 (age 53) Papua New Guinea

Playing information
- Position: Prop
Representative
| Years | Team | Pld | T | G | FG | P |
|---|---|---|---|---|---|---|
| 1996 | Papua New Guinea NRL | 1 | 0 | 0 | 0 | 0 |
| 2000–2001 | Papua New Guinea | 6 | 4 | 0 | 0 | 16 |

Michael Mondo is a Papua New Guinean rugby league footballer who represented Papua New Guinea national rugby league team in the 2000 World Cup.

== Playing career ==
Mondo played for Papua New Guinea in 1996 against Australia during the Super League war.

He later played six tests for Papua New Guinea between 2000 and 2001, including four at the 2000 World Cup.

Mondo also had two separate stints with the Narrandera Lizards in 1996 (in which he was a Group 20 grand finalist which lost 21-20 to Yanco Wamoon) and 1998 and again two separate stints with Yanco Wamoon in 1999 and 2000 (in which he won a premiership with Yanco Wamoon) and 2005 until 2008.
