= Mick Jenkins (rugby league) =

Wales international rugby league footballer

Michael Jenkins
Personal information
- Full name: Michael Jenkins
- Born: 9 June 1972 (age 53); Gold Coast, Queensland, Australia

Playing information
- Position: Hooker, Second-row, Prop
Club
Years	Team	Pld	T	G	FG	P
1998	Newcastle Knights	3	0	0	0	0
1999	Workington Town	12	7	0	0	28
1999	Gateshead Thunder	16	3	0	0	12
2000	Hull FC	27	3	0	0	12
	Total	58	13	0	0	52
Representative
Years	Team	Pld	T	G	FG	P
2000	Wales	5	1	0	0	4

Michael Jenkins (born 9 June 1972) is a former professional rugby league footballer who played in the 1990s and 2000s. A Wales international forward, Jenkins played at club level for the Newcastle Knights, Workington Town, Gateshead Thunder and Hull FC.

== Early life ==
Jenkins was born in Gold Coast, Queensland, Australia.

== Club career ==
He was signed by Workington Town having only gone to the United Kingdom to accompany close friend Evan Cochrane who had signed for Workington Town. After half a season playing at Workington Town, an offer was received from Super League club Gateshead Thunder. After signing with the Gateshead Thunder, Workington Town received a £15,000 transfer fee.

== International honours ==
Jenkins made his international début for Wales in 2000 against South Africa. Playing at Hooker, Jenkins scored two tries in the 40–12 win.

Jenkins further represented Wales at the 2000 Rugby League World Cup scoring a try in the 38–6 victory over Cook Islands.
