= Steve Berryman =

Cook Islands & NZ international rugby league footballer

Playing information
- Position: Centre, Five-eighth, Lock
Representative
Years	Team	Pld	T	G	FG	P
1999–00	New Zealand Māori	2	0	0	0	0
2000	Cook Islands	2	2	2	0	12

Steve Berryman is a former professional rugby league and rugby union footballer who played the 1990s, 2000s and 2010s. He played representative level rugby league (RL) for the New Zealand Māori team and Cook Islands, and at club level for Taniwharau, Waikato Cougars, Wainuiomata Lions, Manly Sea Eagles, Northern Eagles and Toukley Hawks, as a centre, five-eighth, or lock, and club level rugby union (RU) for the Te Whānau side.

== Background ==
He is of Cook Islanders, Māori and New Zealand descent.

== Playing career ==
Berryman attended Huntly College and started his career playing for the Taniwharau in the Waikato Rugby League competition in 1993.

Berryman quickly became a Waikato Cougars representative. Berryman moved to the Wainuiomata Lions in 2000 so he could play in the inaugural season of the Bartercard Cup. He captained the Lions, pairing David Faiumu in the halves.

Berryman signed with the Manly Sea Eagles in 2001, playing in the NSWRL First Division. He remained with the Northern Eagles in 2002.

== Representative career ==
Berryman played for New Zealand Māori in 1999, and 2000 before switching allegiance to the Cook Islands.

Berryman subsequently won caps for the Cook Islands in the 2000 Rugby League World Cup.

== Later years ==
Berryman later switched to rugby union, playing for the Te Whānau side in the Central Coast Rugby sevens Festival.

As of 2011, Berryman is the captain-coach of the Toukley Hawks in the Central Coast Division of Country Rugby League and has convinced former teammate John Hopoate to join the club.
