= Talite Liavaʻa =

Tonga international rugby league footballer

Talite Liava'a
Personal information
- Born: 18 July 1971 (age 55)

Playing information
- Height: 1.87 m (6 ft 2 in)
- Weight: 104 kg (16 st 5 lb)
- Position: Prop
Club
Years	Team	Pld	T	G	FG	P
1996	Swinton	19	7	0	0	28
1998	Balmain Tigers	6	0	0	0	0
1999–00	Auckland Warriors	11	1	0	0	4
	Total	36	8	0	0	32
Representative
Years	Team	Pld	T	G	FG	P
1995–00	Tonga	3	1	0	0	4

Talite Liava'a (born 18 July 1971) is a former international representative rugby league footballer who played as a prop.

== Representative career ==
Liava'a is one of a handful of players to have played in two World Cups, representing Tonga in 1995 and 2000. At the 1995 World Cup he was twenty four and playing for the Litchfield Bears when picked by coach Mike McClennan.

== Playing career ==
After his exposure in England at the 1995 Rugby League World Cup, Liava'a signed with the Swinton Lions, playing in the lower divisions of English National Leagues. He returned to Australia, playing for the Balmain Tigers in the National Rugby League in 1998. He was not re-signed for the 1999 season and moved to Mackay. He joined the Auckland Warriors midway through the season and stayed for the 2000 season. At the end of the year he was one of many players not re-signed by the new owners.

He later played for Perpignan in France.
