= Richard Piakura =

Cook Island rugby league and rugby union player

Personal information
- Born: 1 July 1976 (age 49) Rarotonga, Cook Islands

Playing information
- Position: Fullback
Club
Years	Team	Pld	T	G	FG	P
	Ngatangiia/Matavera Sea Eagles
Representative
Years	Team	Pld	T	G	FG	P
2000	Cook Islands	3	0	3	0	6

Richard Piakura (born 1 July 1976) is a Cook Island former high jumper, professional rugby league and rugby union footballer who played in the 1990s and 2000s. He played representative level rugby league (RL) for the Cook Islands, and at club level for Ngatangiia/Matavera Sea Eagles, and representative level rugby union (RU) for the Cook Islands at rugby sevens.

== Athletics career ==
Piakura represented the Cook Islands in the high jump, setting his personal best of 1.83m in Tereora in 1998. This is the Cook Islands record in high jump.

== Rugby league career ==
Piakura played in the domestic Cook Islands rugby league competition in 2001.

Piakura played for the Eastern Tornadoes in the 2004 Bartercard Cup.

=== Representative career ===
Piakura made his début for the Cook Islands at the Pacific Challenge. He later played at the 1997 World Nines tournament.

Piakura won caps for Cook Islands in the 2000 Rugby League World Cup.

He later represented the Cook Islands in test series against New Zealand Māori in 2003.

== Rugby union career ==
Piakura represented the Cook Islands in rugby sevens at the 2002 Commonwealth Games in Manchester and the 2006 Commonwealth Games in Melbourne.
