= Raymond Kahl =

PNG international rugby league footballer

Raymond Karl
Personal information
- Born: 28 January 1974 (age 52) Papua New Guinea

Playing information
- Position: Prop, Second-row
Club
Years	Team	Pld	T	G	FG	P
	Enga Mioks
Representative
Years	Team	Pld	T	G	FG	P
1996–2001	Papua New Guinea	11	1	0	0	4

Raymond Karl is a Papua New Guinean rugby league footballer who represented Papua New Guinea national rugby league team in the 2000 World Cup.

== Playing career ==
Karl captained the Enga Mioks to the SP Cup title in 2000.

He played in eleven test matches for Papua New Guinea between 1996 and 2001.
