= Willie Mason =

Former professional rugby league footballer

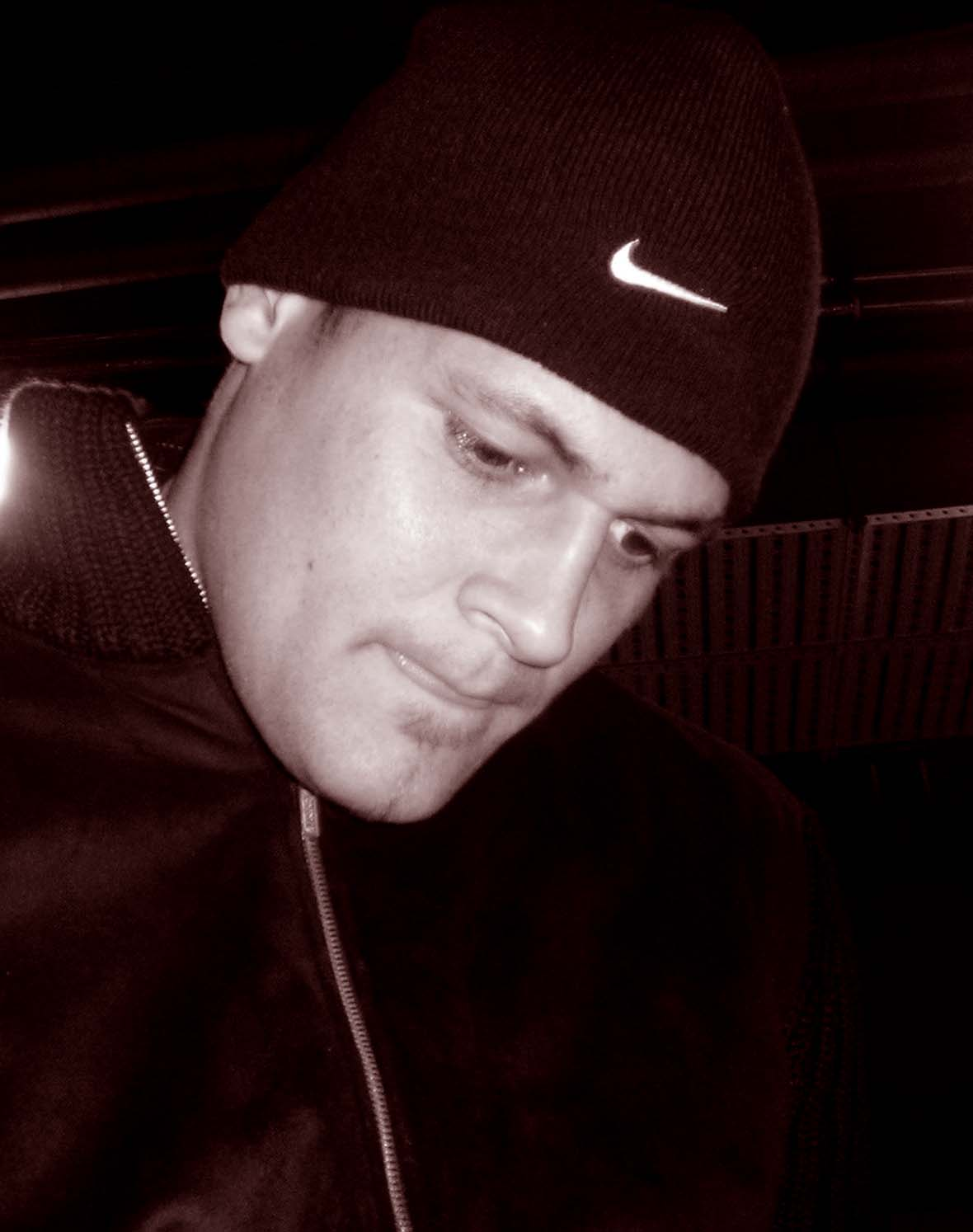

Personal information
- Full name: William Marshall Mason
- Born: 15 April 1980 (age 46) Auckland, New Zealand

Playing information
- Height: 196 cm (6 ft 5 in)
- Weight: 115 kg (18 st 2 lb)

Rugby league
- Position: Second-row, Prop
Club
Years	Team	Pld	T	G	FG	P
2000–07	Canterbury Bulldogs	148	36	0	0	144
2008–09	Sydney Roosters	40	8	0	0	32
2010	North Qld Cowboys	24	1	0	0	4
2011	Hull Kingston Rovers	6	1	0	0	4
2012–14	Newcastle Knights	60	2	0	0	8
2015	Manly Sea Eagles	20	1	0	0	4
2016	Catalans Dragons	16	1	0	0	4
	Total	314	50	0	0	200
Representative
Years	Team	Pld	T	G	FG	P
2000	Tonga	3	2	0	0	8
2002–08	Australia	24	7	0	0	28
2003–13	NSW Country	4	0	0	0	0
2003–08	New South Wales	13	1	0	0	4
2013	NRL All Stars	1	0	0	0	0

Rugby union
Club
Years	Team	Pld	T	G	FG	P
2011	Toulon	1	0	0	0	0
Representative
Years	Team	Pld	T	G	FG	P
2011	Barbarian FC	1	1	0	0	0

William Marshall Mason (born 15 April 1980), also nicknamed "Big Willie", is a former professional rugby league footballer who played in the 2000s and 2010s. An Australia and Tonga international and New South Wales State of Origin representative forward, he played in the National Rugby League for the Canterbury-Bankstown Bulldogs (with whom he won the 2004 Grand Final and Clive Churchill Medal), the Sydney Roosters, the North Queensland Cowboys, the Newcastle Knights and the Manly-Warringah Sea Eagles. Mason also played in the Super League for English club Hull Kingston Rovers and French club, the Catalans Dragons. He also played rugby union in the Top 14 for French club RC Toulonnais. During his career Mason was involved in a number of controversial off-field incidents which have received media publicity due to his high profile in the NRL.

== Early life ==
Mason was born in Auckland, New Zealand, to an Australian father of English descent and a Tongan-Samoan mother, Mason moved to Australia at a young age and grew up in Toronto, New South Wales, playing his junior football for the Toronto Macquarie Scorpions and the Lakes United Seagulls.

Mason experienced a significant growth spurt in his late teenage years; by age 16, he was approximately 6 feet 1 inch (185 cm) tall and weighed 95–100 kilograms (209–220 lb). Between the ages of 16 and 17, he grew to about 6 feet 5 inches (196 cm) and reached a weight of 115 kilograms (254 lb) naturally, without undertaking weight training, attributing this rapid development to genetics.

During his junior years, Mason primarily played in the backline, featuring as a fullback, wing, and centre until the age of 16. In addition to rugby league, he was a talented track and field athlete, competing as a state-level runner in the 100 and 200 metres, and also participating in high jump.

== Professional rugby league career ==
In 1997, Mason was signed by the Hunter Mariners and played in the lower grades until the club became defunct at the end of the year.

Despite being from Newcastle, Mason was unable to join the Newcastle Knights because the club had a policy against signing players who had been affiliated with the Hunter Mariners during the Super League war. This policy forced Mason, at 17 or 18 years old and having recently lost his father, to leave his hometown and family to pursue his rugby league career in Sydney, though he would have preferred to play his entire career for Newcastle.

=== Canterbury-Bankstown ===
In 1998, Mason signed with the Canterbury-Bankstown Bulldogs and played in the under-18s Jersey Flegg competition. In 1999, Mason suffered a leg fracture in the game before the Bulldogs' Jersey Flegg Grand Final win.

In Round 13 of the 2000 NRL season he made his NRL debut for Canterbury-Bankstown against the Penrith Panthers after first-grader Darren Britt suffered an injury. He became a regular first-grader for the rest of the season. After the 2000 season, Mason made his international debut for Tonga, his mother's country of origin, in the 2000 Rugby League World Cup played in Great Britain and Ireland.

In 2002, Mason was reported to have run from a taxi to avoid paying the fare. After the 2002 NRL season, Mason was selected to make his debut for Australia against Great Britain. He scored a try on debut.

During 2003, Mason earned a call-up to make his debut for New South Wales in Game 3 of the 2003 State of Origin series. After the 2003 NRL season, he went on the 2003 Kangaroo tour of Great Britain and France, helping Australia to victory over Great Britain in what would be the last time the two nations contested an Ashes series. In 2003, he tested positive to an illicit social drug, reported to be an amphetamine, and was fined $25,000 by his club. Mason has never commented on the issue publicly.

In 2004, Mason along with Trent Waterhouse, Craig Wing, Craig Gower and Mark O'Meley, were fined for unprofessional behaviour and for leaving the team hotel after the side had returned from the night out. Mason forged another player's signature at an autograph event, and after a heavy drinking session with teammates, reportedly visited a brothel. The next season Canterbury-Bankstown reached the 2004 NRL Grand Final and triumphed 16–13 over the Sydney Roosters. Mason was awarded the Clive Churchill Medal for Man of the Match. Reflecting on his Clive Churchill Medal win in the 2004 NRL Grand Final against the Sydney Roosters, Mason stated it was the "first time I actually felt bad of winning something" due to many opposing players being his long-time friends and former junior teammates from Newcastle, including Anthony Minichiello, Brett Finch, and Luke Ricketson.

During the late 1990s and early 2000s, Gary Carden served as a highly influential, albeit infamously tough, trainer for the Canterbury-Bankstown Bulldogs' junior and development squads. Willie Mason credits Carden with rigorously preparing players mentally and physically, stating that Carden "would train you harder mentally, physically, and drain you more than anyone in first grade." Notably, 15 out of the 17 players in the Bulldogs' 2004 Grand Final winning squad, including Mason, Sonny Bill Williams, Johnathan Thurston, and Brent Sherwin, had come through Carden's demanding training regime.

He was selected in the Australian team to go and compete in the end of season 2004 Rugby League Tri-Nations tournament. In the final against Great Britain Mason played from the interchange bench and scored a try in the Kangaroos' 44–4 victory. Also at the end of 2004, Mason played in Australia's win over the United States in an international rugby league friendly match at Philadelphia's Franklin Field but suffered a fractured ankle.

Mason was out of action during the first half of the 2005 NRL season and only played the last nine games of the season. He played in the 2005 Tri-nations tournament.

In June 2006, news speculation surfaced that Mason was considering joining the United States' National Football League (NFL), a childhood dream. He was said to be courted by several teams, including the Oakland Raiders and San Francisco 49ers. In July it was confirmed the New York Giants had offered him the opportunity to trial with them after the Rugby League Tri-Nations series finished in November. However, the Canterbury club objected to the deal, and Mason remained with the club beyond 2006. In 2006, Willie returned to become a regular member of the Bulldogs team where he managed to play 20 club matches, all three Origin games for NSW – in which he was named Man of the Match in the opening game and three Tests for Australia in the 2006 Tri-Nations series. He was a firm figure in the clubs return to finals football as the Bulldogs finished second on the ladder, Canterbury-Bankstown were beaten by eventual Premiers the Brisbane Broncos one game shy of the Grand Final. Mason was televised appearing to swear during the New Zealand haka, before game 1 of the 2006 Gillette Tri-nations Series. Later in the match Mason suffered a swollen black eye and suspected broken eye socket from a shoulder charge by David Kidwell. Mason explained that his swearing was in response to the traditional Māori dance being performed by Brent Webb, an Indigenous Australian of Torres Strait Islander origin who became a New Zealand citizen. Mason was banned for one game and fined $5,000 following an altercation with Stuart Fielden during Great Britain's victory over Australia in November 2006. In December 2006 Mason took part in a trial with the New York Jets, but still maintained he would fulfil his contract with the Canterbury club until the end of the 2009 season. Mason said "I'm probably at the time in my career now where maybe it is time for a change. New York City is the capital of the world. I'm pretty sure I could settle in there if given the opportunity..." However a Jets representative stated that Mason even being offered a contract was very unlikely, "I don't think they were even football drills, it was more of a visit. We just had a look at him and that is where we left it." The Jets coach Eric Mangini was impressed with Mason, saying "Willie is a guy that came to our attention, he is a pretty good rugby player, and it was just one of those opportunities we had, where we have to take a look at him. What we're doing is taking a look at him, seeing what potential there is for him. He seems to have been a pretty dynamic guy in that league for a long time. He seemed relatively feisty when I spoke to him." The Bulldogs never anticipated any move, saying "Willie has given us his guarantee he will be with us."

Mason was selected to play for the Australian national team at second-row forward the 2007 ANZAC Test match victory against New Zealand. A few weeks later he was involved in a nightclub altercation with the out-spoken Richie Williams, who Mason claimed shows no respect to the older players in the NRL and is a cocky kid who has yet to prove himself in the NRL. Mason was voted the most hated player by a fans poll in 2007. At Sydney Airport in 2007, Mason verbally challenged a female reporter from radio station 2GB, resulting in a complaint from 2GB to the Canterbury-Bankstown club and the ARL Mason later admitted to the outburst, which was captured on audio recordings, and apologised to 2GB journalist Michelle Keighran. Mason is sponsored by sportswear manufacturer, Champion, which almost severed its contract with the controversial footballer as a result of the incident. In 2007, Mason was selected for all three Origin games for NSW and represented Australia in the ANZAC Test match. At the conclusion of the 2007 NRL season, the media began reporting that Mason was unhappy at the Canterbury club. On 31 October 2007 The Daily Telegraph reported that Mason wanted to leave the Bulldogs after an altercation with the club's CEO, Malcolm Noad. A day later it was reported that Mason was to be released from the final two years of his contract after the club rejected his chance to fight in a professional boxing match worth up to A$100,000 and because the club claimed to be fining Mason $50,000 for failure to attend an end of season function, although this was denied by Canterbury-Bankstown. Speculation that Mason was to be released from his contract led to a number of English and Australian clubs confirming they were seeking to sign Mason to a contract for the 2008 season. After the Roosters were able to release back-rower Ashley Harrison to the Gold Coast Titans and considered releasing other players, the club was able to make an offer for Mason. On 15 November 2007 it was confirmed that Mason had signed a three-year deal with the Sydney Roosters.

=== Sydney Roosters ===
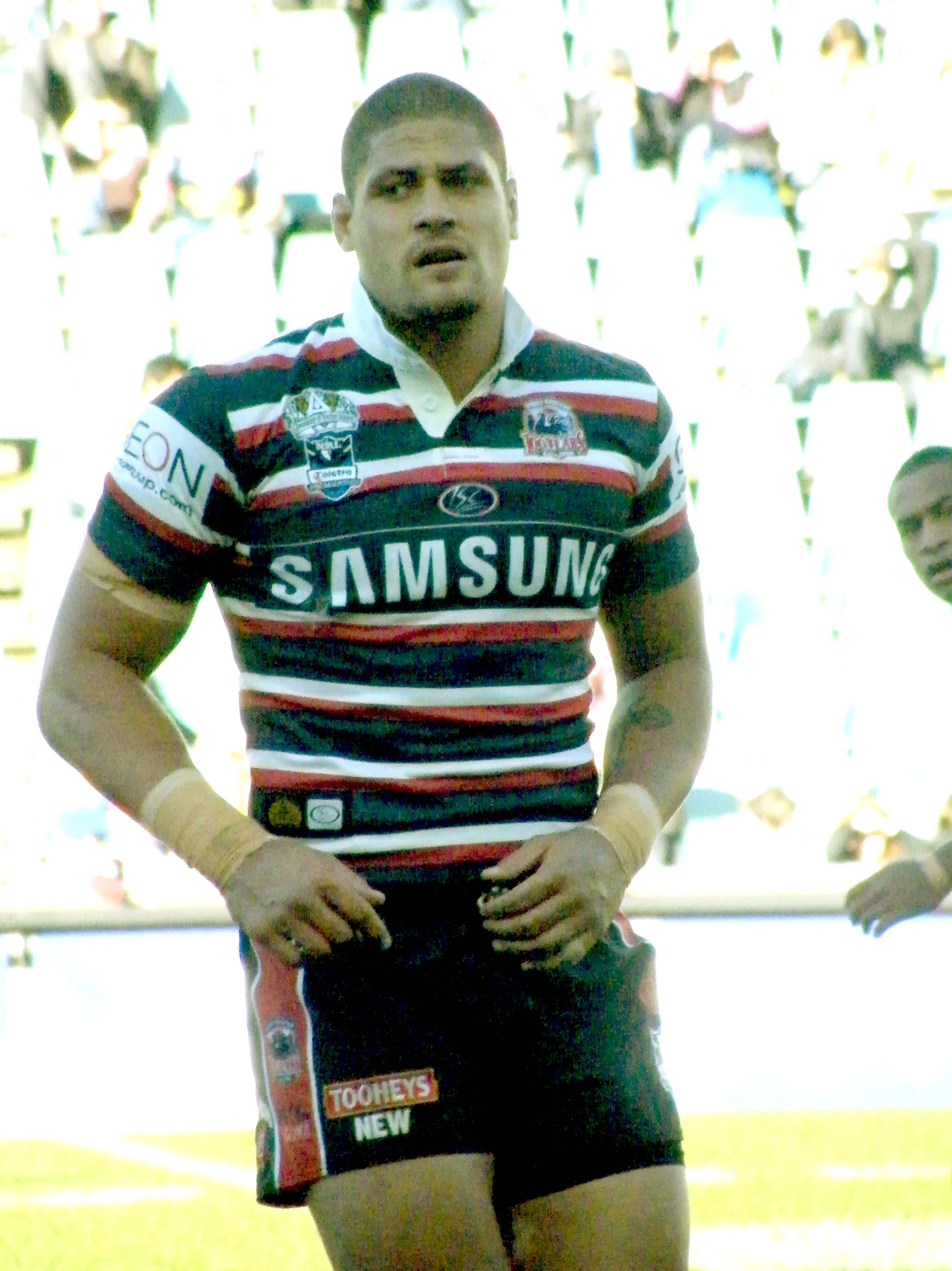
Mason while playing for the Roosters in 2008

In February 2008, Mason and his new Roosters teammate Anthony Tupou were charged with urinating in a public place during a visit to Port Macquarie.

In August 2008, Mason was named in both the preliminary 46-man Kangaroos squad for the 2008 Rugby League World Cup and the Tonga training squad. However, in the final regular game of the season Mason ruptured his anterior cruciate ligament in his knee and took no part in the Roosters Finals Campaign.

Mason missed the Roosters first game of the 2009 season after they were thrashed by South Sydney Rabbitohs 52–12. Mason returned in Round 2, against the Canberra Raiders they were victors 30–4. In May 2009 Mason was fined $2,000 by Sydney Roosters after being photographed urinating in a public place. He was also dropped to the Newtown Jets. The Roosters finished the year in last spot. When Brian Smith took over the coaching role at the Roosters he told Mason he was not in his future plans at the Roosters and his services were no long needed there. Interest in Mason was said to be high with a number of high-profile rugby union and rugby league clubs chasing Mason's signature, Japanese Rugby Union teams, French Super League team Catalans Dragons and the Queensland Reds were just some of the clubs after Mason. He was given extended leave from the Roosters to find a new club. There were also some rumours he was going to join the Newcastle Knights late in the year, but the Knights denied any relation to him. The North Queensland Cowboys made a late play for Willie Mason and held talks with him on 2 February 2010 If the Cowboys had rejected Mason the Newcastle Knights were poised to make a deal with him as they had lost prop Danny Wicks

=== North Queensland Cowboys ===
On 5 February 2010, Mason agreed to a one-year contract with the North Queensland Cowboys. He made his Cowboys debut off the bench in a 30–24 loss to the Broncos in Round 1, 2010.

=== Super League ===
In September 2011, Mason signed a three-year contract with Hull Kingston Rovers, pending a successful working visa application. Six months into his contract, Hull KR were forced to release Mason as he was unable to obtain a Tongan passport that would have enabled him to come off their overseas quota.

=== Newcastle Knights ===
On 18 April 2012, it was confirmed Mason had signed with the Wayne Bennett coached Newcastle Knights for the remainder of the 2012 NRL season. He made his Newcastle debut at Hunter Stadium in their Round 8 victory over the Penrith Panthers. Mason's younger brother Rodney was also playing rugby league with the Newcastle Knights at the time. On 15 November 2012, Mason re-signed with the Knights for two years.

On 10 March 2014, Mason was disqualified from driving for six months and fined $900 for drink driving. The offence was in relation to Australia Day of that year where after a marathon drinking session, Mason drove to training, was pulled over by police and blew a blood alcohol reading of 0.09.

=== Manly Warringah Sea Eagles ===
On 28 October 2014, after a three-year stint with the Knights, Mason signed a one-year contract with the Manly Warringah Sea Eagles starting in 2015. On 13 May 2015, Mason was in the spotlight again, this time for being grabbed by Newcastle player Korbin Sims on the genitals in Manly's 30–10 loss to Newcastle at Brookvale Oval. Sims tried to laugh off the incident by saying "I apologise to the fans, the NRL and people involved with the game and the club, if anyone found it inappropriate", Sims told Fairfax Media. "It was merely meant to be a harmless gesture between two friends."

In 2018, Mason spoke to the media about his time at Manly in relation to the ongoing saga with the board infighting and coach Trent Barrett claiming the facilities at the club were not up to date. Mason said "I spent my last year there in 2015 so I understand where a lot of the backlash is coming from, back then we were getting changed out of our cars, out of our boots. It was pretty unprofessional. Only three years ago you're getting changed out of your f****n boot. It's ridiculous and they've only got their shit together now because Trent Barrett kicked up a stink. We had to share weights with the Australian touch team and union, there was about four or five clubs in there. I'd hate to be a part of the club at the moment... it's a very proud club but it's in shambles at the moment. I feel sorry for all the players".

=== Catalans Dragons ===
On 16 February 2016, Mason returned to the Super League with Catalans Dragons, signing a one-year contract starting effective immediately.

== Rugby union ==
After being released by Hull KR, Mason signed with Top 14 rugby union side, Toulon in April 2011. He was seen by Toulon as a possible successor to former Bulldogs teammate and past Toulon centre Sonny Bill Williams. In June Mason was selected to play for Barbarian F.C. from the interchange bench in their victory against Wales.

In December Toulon agreed to release Mason as he was reportedly unhappy in rugby union. Mason was described by Toulon fans as a "Brad Thorn wannabe" in the club's history.

== Post-football career ==
In 2017, Mason was scheduled to appear as a celebrity contestant on Seven Network's Australian version of Hell's Kitchen.

In July 2017, Mason branded former professional rugby league footballer Tommy Raudonikis an idiot after Raudonikis said that Jarryd Hayne had failed in the NFL and accused him of not trying while playing for the Gold Coast Titans. Mason rushed to Hayne's defence saying "He had a contract, he sold the most jerseys in the NFL ... I just don't like it when you get uneducated people on there who hammer people about absolute rubbish, Tommy should just shut his mouth, I hate how everybody is coming out and bagging him about his money. He's earning $1.2 million, who cares?, you get these idiots from the 70s and 80s bashing him".

In June 2018, Mason claimed that when he was at Manly that nobody wanted to play alongside teammate Daly Cherry-Evans and that he was the reason there was such a divide at the club. Mason went on to say "I was there in 2015, I've never seen, never been involved in a team, that I could just see such a divide in a club, It was because of Cherry-Evans. All this shit that's been happening around him, like, something's wrong, "He then signed with the Gold Coast Titans for like 10 years", Mason said. "And then there was a big f..... meeting, Cherry-Evans has got something to say. "I just signed a deal with the Titans boys, blah blah blah". "I'm like, who gives a f..., you don't hold a meeting about that. No one cared"

Mason's comments came in the wake of former Manly player Anthony Watmough commenting on a Hello Sport Podcast calling Cherry-Evans a "fuckwit" and that he was the reason other players needed to depart the club.

In 2022, Mason was the Captain for Kangaroos alumni vs. Kiwi alumni Match Fit squad. In September 2023, Mason publicly sledged some of the Newcastle players on his LEVELS podcast saying that the club had the “worst f**king spine in the league without Kalyn Ponga”. Following Newcastle's victory in the elimination final, Newcastle player Tyson Gamble spoke to the media stating “Me, Jacko and Phoenix all saw it,” Everybody's got an opinion. It's alright, he should probably worry about his own backyard before he starts worrying about other people. He was a middle not a half, so tell him to get f***ed". After Newcastle were eliminated the following week by the New Zealand Warriors, Mason took to his social media account and wrote "There could not be a bigger hole that Tyson Gamble wants to crawl into right now. Pick ya battles boy. You are below average".

In his post-playing career, Mason co-hosts a podcast titled "Levels Network" with Justin Horo. The unscripted podcast, released twice a week on Mondays and Thursdays, covers a range of topics beyond just rugby league, allowing Mason to elaborate freely on his experiences and insights.

Aware of the potential long-term effects of head trauma from his rugby league career, Mason proactively manages his brain health by undergoing brain testing every four years. He also actively engages in activities to promote neuroplasticity and cognitive growth, including learning new skills and stepping outside his comfort zone.

=== Acting career ===
Mason launched his acting career in 2024 as ‘Terry Torres’, a main character in the Stan Australia series Sunny Nights.

== Playing style ==
Mason has stated that Gordon Tallis was his favourite player while growing up, and he emulated Tallis' playing style. This admiration influenced Mason's decision to transition to the back row position and to wear the number 11 jersey.

== Personal life ==
A defining moment in his youth was burying his father at the age of 17, which profoundly impacted his perspective on life. His mother is of Tongan descent, and he attributes his significant size and build to his family's genetics, noting several tall relatives. Mason is one of eight children, having five sisters and two brothers.

Preceded by Luke Priddis (Penrith Panthers)	Clive Churchill Medallist; 2004	Succeeded by Scott Prince (Wests Tigers)
