= Tiri Toa =

Cook Island rugby league footballer

Personal information
- Full name: Tiri Toa

Playing information
- Position: Wing
Representative
Years	Team	Pld	T	G	FG	P
2000	Cook Islands	1	1	0	0	4

Tiri Toa is a Cook Island former professional rugby league footballer who played as a winger in the 2000s. He played at representative level for Cook Islands.

== International honours ==
Tiri Toa won a cap for Cook Islands in the 2000 Rugby League World Cup.
