= Leon Barnard =

South African rugby league footballer

Personal information
- Born: South Africa

Playing information
- Position: Centre
Representative
| Years | Team | Pld | T | G | FG | P |
|---|---|---|---|---|---|---|
| 2000 | South Africa | 4 | 1 | 0 | 0 | 4 |

Leon Barnard is a South African rugby league footballer who represented South Africa at the 2000 World Cup.
