= David Buko =

Papua New Guinea international rugby league footballer

Personal information
- Full name: David Buko
- Born: 19 March 1972 Goroka, Papua New Guinea
- Died: 21 January 2002 (aged 29) Goroka, Papua New Guinea

Playing information
- Position: Fullback, Wing
Club
Years	Team	Pld	T	G	FG	P
	Goroka Lahanis
1999	Western Suburbs	8	2	0	0	8
	Total	8	2	0	0	8
Representative
Years	Team	Pld	T	G	FG	P
	Northern Zone
1993–01	Papua New Guinea	12	5	3	0	26
- Source: As of 29 January 2019

David Buko (1972–2002) was a Papua New Guinean professional rugby league footballer who represented Papua New Guinea in the 1995 and 2000 World Cups.

== Playing career ==
Buko began his career in the early 1990s and represented Northern Zone before first making the national side in 1993 after helping the Goroka Lahinis win the SP Cup grand final. He played for the national side in both the 1995 and 2000 World Cups.

In 1999, Buko joined the Western Suburbs Magpies, playing in eight games at both wing and fullback. Buko played in the club's final ever game as a first grade side which was a 60-16 loss against Auckland at Campbelltown Stadium. The club merged with Balmain in 2000 to form the Wests Tigers and Buko was not retained, instead playing in Wagga.

Buko returned to Papua New Guinea and again played for the Goroka Lahinis and the national side. In the 2001 series against France his form was so impressive that the Limoux Grizzlies offered him a contract.

Buko played a total of 17 matches for Papua New Guinea between 1993 and 2001.

Buko died in January 2002, he had contracted typhoid in 2001 and had chronic fever at the time of his death.
