= Pascal Jampy =

Former France international rugby league footballer

Personal information
- Born: 1 May 1973 (age 53) Perpignan, Pyrénées-Orientales, France

Playing information
- Height: 186 cm (6 ft 1 in)
- Position: Second-row, Loose forward
Club
Years	Team	Pld	T	G	FG	P
1990–95	XIII Catalan
1995	AS Saint-Estève
1996–97	Paris Saint-Germain
1996–00	XIII Catalan
2002–05	Union Treiziste Catalane
2006	Catalans Dragons	13	0	0	0	0
	Total	13	0	0	0	0
Representative
Years	Team	Pld	T	G	FG	P
1993–03	France	38	13	0	0	52

Pascal Jampy (born 1 May 1973) is a French former professional rugby league footballer who played for Paris Saint-Germain and the Catalans Dragons in the Super League. He represented France in the 1995 and 2000 World Cups, and also on the 2001 tour of New Zealand and Papua New Guinea.

Jampy was a substitute in Catalans first ever Super League game - a 38–30 victory over Wigan Warriors. He played 13 games for the club before retiring at the end of the season.
