= Yacine Dekkiche =

France international rugby league & union footballer

Personal information
- Born: 19 February 1980 (age 45); France
- Height: 178 cm (5 ft 10 in)
- Weight: 85 kg (13 st 5 lb)

Playing information

Rugby league
- Position: Wing, Centre
Club
Years	Team	Pld	T	G	FG	P
2000	Huddersfield-Sheffield	14	3	0	0	12
Representative
Years	Team	Pld	T	G	FG	P
1999–2000	France	4	1	0	0	4

Rugby union
- Position: Centre
Club
Years	Team	Pld	T	G	FG	P
2001–02	La Rochelle	8	0	0	0	0
2005–06	Tarbes	15	3	0	0	15
2006–08	Limoges	4	0	0	0	0
2008–10	Niort	25	2	0	0	10
2012–13	Saint-Jean d'Angely	4	1	0	0	5
	Total	56	6	0	0	30

Yacine Dekkiche is a French rugby league and rugby union footballer who played in the 1990s and 2000s. He represented France at the 2000 Rugby League World Cup.

== Playing career ==
Dekkiche originally played rugby league and in 2000 played for Huddersfield-Sheffield in the Super League. Between 1999 and 2000 he played in four matches for France, including one at the 2000 World Cup.

In 2001 Dekkiche switched codes to rugby union, joining La Rochelle in the Top 16. Between 2005 and 2010 Dekkiche played for a variety of clubs in both the Rugby Pro D2 and Fédérale 1 divisions. In the 2012–13 season he played for Saint-Jean-d'Angély.
