= Travis Touma =

Australian rugby league footballer

Personal information
- Born: Australia

Playing information
- Position: Wing, Centre
Representative
Years	Team	Pld	T	G	FG	P
2000–2003	Lebanon	7	3	0	0	12

Travis Touma is an Australian former rugby league footballer who represented Lebanon at the 2000 Rugby League World Cup.

== Background ==
Touma was born in Australia to a Lebanese father and an Indigenous Australian mother.

== Playing career ==
He played seven test matches for Lebanon between 2000 and 2003 and also competed in the 2004 World Sevens.

== Post playing ==
He now works as a physiotherapist in Sydney, Australia. He has worked for the Sydney Roosters, South Sydney Rabbitohs and currently works at the Canterbury-Bankstown Bulldogs.
