= Arnaud Dulac =

Former France international rugby league footballer

Personal information
- Born: 10 March 1973 (age 52) France
- Height: 181 cm (5 ft 11 in)
- Weight: 97 kg (15 st 4 lb)

Playing information
- Position: Centre, Five-eighth
Club
Years	Team	Pld	T	G	FG	P
	Saint-Gaudens Bears
Representative
Years	Team	Pld	T	G	FG	P
1995–2004	France	23	7	12	0	52

Arnaud Dulac is a French rugby league footballer who represented France in the 2000 World Cup.

== Playing career ==
Dulac played for the Saint-Gaudens Bears and played twenty three test matches for France between 1995 and 2004. He played in the 1997 Super League World Nines, on the 2001 tour of New Zealand and Papua New Guinea and in all four matches at the 2000 World Cup.
