= Eddie Aila =

Papua New Guinean international rugby footballer

Personal information
- Born: 21 April 1979 (age 47) Papua New Guinea

Playing information

Rugby league
- Position: Wing, Centre
Club
| Years | Team | Pld | T | G | FG | P |
|---|---|---|---|---|---|---|
| | Wynnum Manly Seagulls |
Representative
| Years | Team | Pld | T | G | FG | P |
| 2000–01 | Papua New Guinea | 5 | 1 | 0 | 4 |

Rugby union
Club
| Years | Team | Pld | T | G | FG | P |
|---|---|---|---|---|---|---|
| 2004 | Souths Rugby |
- Source: RLP As of 10 November 2023

Eddie Aila is a Papua New Guinean rugby footballer who represented Papua New Guinea at rugby league in the 2000 World Cup.

== Playing career ==
Aila began his career playing rugby union before joining the Wynnum Manly Seagulls in the Queensland Cup. From there he was selected for Papua New Guinea and he played at the 2000 World Cup. Aila finished his national career having played in five test matches.

Aila later returned to rugby union joining the Souths Rugby club. He plays for Logan City and coaches their colts side.
