= Nelson Lomi =

Tongan rugby league footballer (born 1979)

Personal information
- Born: 22 July 1979 (age 47)

Playing information
- Position: Prop
Club
| Years | Team | Pld | T | G | FG | P |
|---|---|---|---|---|---|---|
| 1999–2000 | Sydney City Roosters | 5 | 0 | 0 | 0 | 0 |
Representative
| Years | Team | Pld | T | G | FG | P |
| 1999–2000 | Tonga | 4 | 1 | 0 | 0 | 4 |
- Source: RLP

Nelson Lomi is a Tongan rugby league footballer who represented Tonga in the 2000 World Cup.

== Playing career ==
Lomi was a member of the Sydney City Roosters in 1999 and 2000, making his NRL debut in Round 23 against the Brisbane Broncos. He went on to play in five first grade matches for the Roosters.

Lomi then joined the Newtown Jets in the NSWRL Premier League.

== Representative career ==
Lomi made his debut for Tonga in 1999 in a test match against New Zealand. He was a member of the 2000 World Cup squad, getting sin-binned in the match against France. In all he played five test matches for Tonga between 1999 and 2000.

== Later years ==
Lomi now works as a carpenter, working alongside fellow-NRL player Fred Briggs in 2007.
