= Tim O'Shea (rugby) =

South African rugby union and rugby league footballer

Personal information
- Born: 1978 or 1979 (age 46–47); South Africa

Playing information

Rugby union
- Position: Centre
Club
Years	Team	Pld	T	G	FG	P
	Griquas
2003–200?	Coventry
	Total	0	0	0	0	0

Rugby league
- Position: Fullback
Representative
Years	Team	Pld	T	G	FG	P
2000	South Africa	1	0	1	0	2

Tim O'Shea (born 1978 or 1979) is a South African rugby footballer who represented his country in the 2000 Rugby League World Cup.

== Playing career ==
O'Shea originally played rugby union for Griquas.

In 2000 he played for South Africa in the 2000 Rugby League World Cup.

In 2003 he signed with the Coventry R.F.C. in England.
