= Jean-Emmanuel Cassin =

France international rugby league & union player

Personal information
- Born: 29 February 1980 (age 46) France
- Height: 176 cm (5 ft 9 in)
- Weight: 82 kg (12 st 13 lb)

Playing information
- Position: Centre
Club
Years	Team	Pld	T	G	FG	P
1986–97	Toulouse Jules-Julien XIII
1997–01	Toulouse Olympique
	Total	0	0	0	0	0
Representative
Years	Team	Pld	T	G	FG	P
1999–01	France	8	2	0	0	8

Rugby union career
- Position(s): Wing, Centre
Senior career
Years	Team	Apps	(Points)
2001-03	Biarritz Olympique	37	(30)
2003-04	US Colomiers	12	(0)
2004-06	Section Paloise	47	(10)
2006-10	US Montauban	91	(50)
2010-present	Oyonnax Rugby	54	(25)

Jean-Emmanuel Cassin is a French rugby footballer who plays rugby union for Oyonnax Rugby and represented his country at rugby league in the 2000 World Cup.

== Playing career ==
Cassin played rugby league for Toulouse Olympique and was first selected to represent France in 1999. He played at the 2000 World Cup and on the 2001 tour of New Zealand and Papua New Guinea.

Later in the 2001 season Cassin switched to rugby union. He has since played for Biarritz Olympique, US Montauban US Colomiers, Section Paloise and Oyonnax Rugby.
