= Hassan Saleh =

Former Lebanon international rugby league footballer

Personal information
- Full name: Hassan Saleh
- Born: 22 October 1979 (age 47) Sydney, New South Wales, Australia
- Height: 186 cm (6 ft 1 in)
- Weight: 92 kg (14 st 7 lb; 203 lb)

Playing information
- Position: Wing, Fullback
Club
Years	Team	Pld	T	G	FG	P
2001–02	Wests Tigers	30	11	1	0	46
2003	St. George Illawarra	11	1	0	0	4
2004	Cronulla-Sutherland	3	1	0	0	4
	Total	44	13	1	0	54
Representative
Years	Team	Pld	T	G	FG	P
1999–04	Lebanon	5	3	0	0	12

Hassan Saleh (born 22 October 1979) is an Australian former professional rugby league footballer who played in the 1990s and 2000s. He played for the Wests Tigers, St George Illawarra Dragons and the Cronulla-Sutherland Sharks in the National Rugby League competition. He also represented the Lebanon national rugby league team on several occasions, including the 2000 World Cup. Saleh's position of choice was usually on the wing but he also played at fullback.

== Background ==
Saleh was born in Sydney, New South Wales, Australia, he is of Lebanese descent.

== Playing career ==
Saleh made his first grade debut for the Wests Tigers in round 7 of the 2001 NRL season against the Canberra Raiders at Campbelltown Stadium. In 2003, Saleh signed with St George and made 11 appearances for the club before signing with rivals Cronulla-Sutherland for the 2004 season.

Saleh's final game in the top grade was for Cronulla in round 4 2004 against South Sydney at the Sydney Football Stadium. Saleh scored a try during the game which Cronulla lost 36–12.
