= Lesley Vainikolo =

NZ international rugby league & England international rugby union footballer

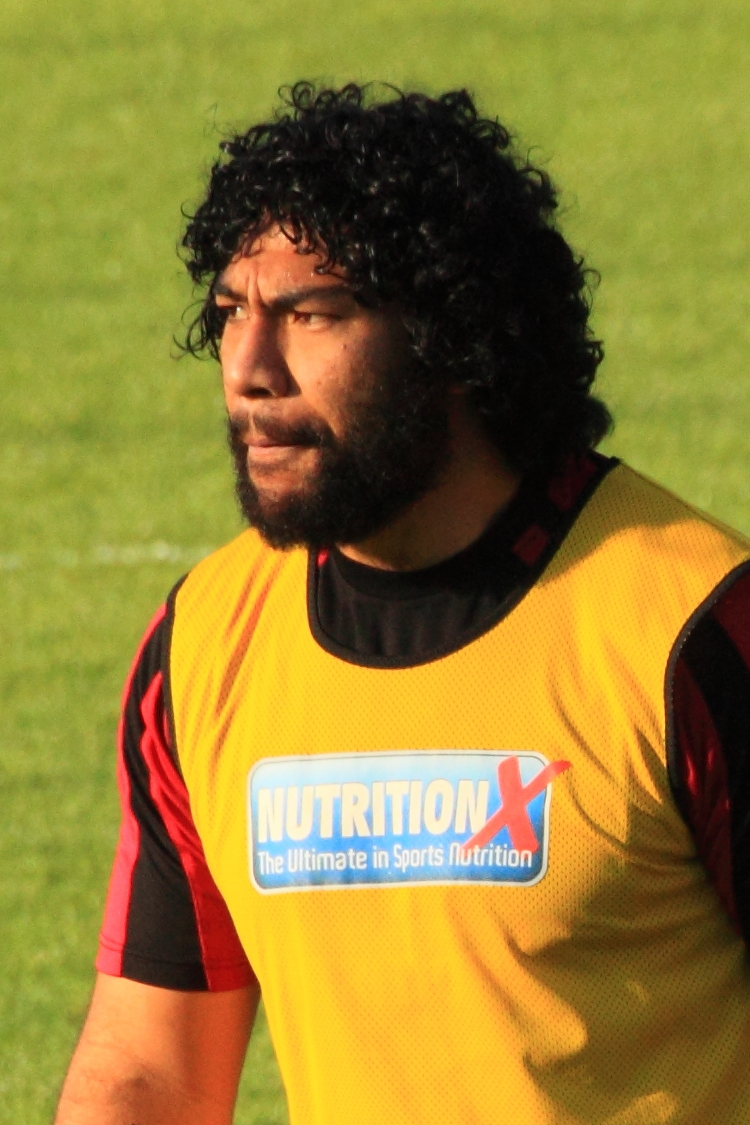

Personal information
- Born: Lesley Paea 'I'muli Vainikolo; 4 May 1979 (age 47) Nukuʻalofa, Tonga
- Height: 1.88 m (6 ft 2 in)
- Weight: 112 kg (17 st 9 lb)

Playing information
- Position: Wing
Club
Years	Team	Pld	T	G	FG	P
1997–02	Canberra Raiders	69	35	0	0	140
2002–07	Bradford Bulls	152	149	1	0	598
	Total	221	184	1	0	738
Representative
Years	Team	Pld	T	G	FG	P
1998–05	New Zealand	14	14	0	0	56

Rugby union career
- Position(s): Wing, Centre
Senior career
Years	Team	Apps	(Points)
2007–12	Gloucester Rugby	87	(180)
2012–13	La Rochelle	13	(5)
2013–14	Angerien		
International career
Years	Team	Apps	(Points)
2002	Tonga sevens		
2008	England	5	(0)

Lesley Paea 'I'muli Vainikolo (born 4 May 1979) is a former professional rugby league and rugby union footballer. A dual code international, he has played for the New Zealand Kiwis in rugby league and England in rugby union.

He began his career playing rugby league in Australia for the Canberra Raiders of the National Rugby League and later in England for the Bradford Bulls of Super League. He then moved to English rugby union club Gloucester. In both codes, he has usually played as a wing.

== Early life and career ==
Vainikolo was born on 4 May 1979 in Nukuʻalofa, Tonga. His family uprooted to Mangere, Auckland in late 1986. He grew up in South Auckland, New Zealand playing rugby union but switched to rugby league as he explains, "I first got into rugby league when I was 11. One of my mates got me into it. His team were short on numbers and my mate asked if I wanted to play. I grew up playing union, so I had the basic skills. I played the game and absolutely loved it. And I've been hooked since." Vainikolo played for the Mangere East Hawks in the Auckland Rugby League competition. He represented Auckland in the 1997 Super League Challenge Cup. He represented the Junior Kiwis in 1998.

Vainkolo attended De La Salle College, Mangere East and holds the school's 100m record of 10.90s. Vainikolo ran the 100 metres in 10.5 seconds in qualifying for the 1998 World Junior Athletics Championships.

== Rugby league ==
=== Canberra Raiders ===
Vainikolo had two big league heroes when he was younger – Allan Langer and Mal Meninga. So when Vainikolo received a call from Mal Meninga to join the Canberra Raiders, he had no hesitation. Thus, in 1998, Vainikolo began his professional rugby league career for the Canberra Raiders in the Australian National Rugby League competition. In his first season for the club, he was voted as the Canberra Raiders' rookie of the year. While playing for the Raiders, Vainikolo was dubbed by Australian rugby league commentator Peter Sterling as 'The Volcano'. This occurred because Sterling found the player's surname difficult to pronounce, and so shortened it to "Volcano" – he has been called this nickname ever since. Vainikolo was selected for the New Zealand team to compete in the end of season 1999 Rugby League Tri-Nations tournament. In the final against Australia he played on the wing in the Kiwis' 22–20 loss.

=== Bradford Bulls ===
Vainikolo made his début in the 2002 World Club Challenge. As Super League VI champions, the Bulls played against 2001 NRL Premiers, the Newcastle Knights in January 2002. He played on the wing and scored a try in Bradford's victory. His first season with the club in 2002 was disrupted by injury. He scored only 13 tries in 24 appearances. Vainikolo played for Bradford Bulls on the wing in their 2002 Super League Grand Final loss against St. Helens. In his second season with the club he scored 28 tries in 32 appearances. Vainikolo played for Bradford on the wing in their 2003 Super League Grand Final victory against the Wigan Warriors.

Having won Super League VIII, Bradford played against 2003 NRL Premiers, the Penrith Panthers in the 2004 World Club Challenge. Vainikolo played on the wing, scoring a try in the Bulls' 22–4 victory. In the 2004 season he broke the Super League try scoring record by scoring 36 tries in only 26 appearances, including five hat-tricks. Vainikolo played for the Bradford Bulls on the wing and scored a try in their 2004 Super League Grand Final loss against the Leeds Rhinos.

Again in 2005, his season was disrupted by injury, although he still managed to score 34 tries in 23 appearances. During the 2005 rugby league season his contract was due to expire at the end of the season and Vainikolo received what he says was "a very big offer" from Gloucester Rugby Club, who play in the Guinness Premiership. However, Vainikolo declined the offer and decided to remain with the Bradford Bulls until the end of the 2009 Super League season. After signing the contract, Vainikolo's coach at the time, Brian Noble stated "Lesley is a world-class player and was in big demand from both union and league clubs. To manage to keep him in rugby league says a lot for the sport and also the Bradford Bulls." At the end of the 2005 season, Vainikolo had scored 112 tries in 105 appearances for the Bulls. He played for the Bradford Bulls on the wing, scoring a try in their 2005 Super League Grand Final victory against the Leeds Rhinos. As Super League champions Bradford faced NRL premiers Wests Tigers in the 2006 World Club Challenge. Vainikolo played on the wing in the Bulls' 30–10 victory.

On 15 May 2007, it was confirmed by Bradford Bulls that he was to leave the club and join rugby union side Gloucester. Vainikolo spoke about his move saying: "First and foremost I want to take this opportunity to thank everyone connected with Bradford Bulls – including my team-mates, the staff and all the supporters – for making the last five years so memorable. "Bradford is my home and I know I'll be back. I'm determined to go out on a high and want to contribute as much as possible over the next six weeks before I make the switch." His last match at Odsal was on 17 June 2007 against Hull FC, a 34–8 win. Hooker Terry Newton took the limelight with four tries but Vainikolo was allowed a parting shot when he was given the chance to convert a last minute try from regular goal-kicker Paul Deacon; the first shot of his career and his only two-point score for Bradford Bulls. Vainikolo's last match in the Super League was against the Bulls' rivals the Leeds Rhinos at Headingley on 29 June 2007, he scored the opening try in a 38–14 win for the Bulls, leaving his Bradford Bulls career statistics at 152 games, 149 tries and 1 goal. In August 2007, he was named in Bradford's Team of the Century.

=== International rugby league career ===
Vainikolo made his first international appearance for the New Zealand in 1998. He has scored fourteen tries in twelve appearances for his nation, including nine tries in the 2000 Rugby League World Cup.

He was ruled out of both the 2005 and 2006 Rugby League Tri-Nations series through injury. He has had major surgery on his knees over recent years.

== Rugby union ==
=== Gloucester Rugby ===
In 2007, Vainikolo signed a three-year deal with rugby union Premiership side Gloucester who finished top of the Aviva Premiership in the 2006/07 season. Gloucester head coach, Dean Ryan, was delighted with the signing of Vainikolo. Vainikolo was the fourth Bradford Bulls Player to have joined rugby union in the last 6 years after Tevita Vaikona joined Saracens and Henry Paul and former teammate Karl Pryce who also joined Gloucester Rugby.

Vainikolo scored five tries on his début for Gloucester against Leeds Carnegie on 16 September 2007. He finished the 07-08 Season joint 4th top try scorer with Worcester wing Miles Benjamin with a total of 9 tries.

=== France ===
Vainikolo joined the French side La Rochelle on a two-and-a-half-year deal after leaving Gloucester Rugby at the end of the 2011/2012 season. As of 2013, Vainikolo left La Rochelle as he previously played for Rugby Athletic Club Angerien in Saint-Jean-d'Angély in France, where they compete in Federale 1 the third highest competition in France.

=== Barbarians ===
Vainikolo was selected for the Barbarians squad and played 2 matches, against a Belgium XV in Brussels, when he scored a try, and against Ireland at Kingsholm Stadium, Gloucester.

=== International rugby union career ===
While still playing rugby league, Vainikolo played rugby sevens for Tonga at the 2002 Commonwealth Games.

As a union player, Vainikolo was eligible to play for Tonga by birth, New Zealand by parentage or England by residence. He applied for a British passport and was included in the English squad for the Six Nations Championships in 2008.

He made his début for England against Wales on 2 February 2008, while his second appearance came for England against Italy in Rome on 10 February 2008. He also played against France, also in the Six Nations on 23 February 2008, Scotland on 8 March 2008 and Ireland on 15 March 2008. In total he played five test matches and did not score a try.

He was dropped by Rob Andrew for the England tour of New Zealand, and was left out of Martin Johnson's Elite Squad for 2008–2009.

== Assault charge ==
In 2009 Vainikolo was found not guilty after being accused of grievous bodily harm. On 18 December 2008 he was arrested and charged after being accused of assaulting a man in a fight outside a nightclub in Bath.

A spokesman for the Gloucester said Vainikolo had not been suspended and there was "no reason" for the star to miss the next match. The statement also said "Lesley vigorously contests this allegation and, as demonstrated this season, remains completely focused on his rugby and will not allow this matter to distract him". He appeared before the Magistrates Court on 2 January 2009, where he was found not guilty.

== Match Fit ==
In 2022, he was in the Kiwis alumni team in the season 2 finale of Match Fit as a member of the multi-sport team. In 2023, Vanikolo participated in season 3 of Match Fit, where former rugby players return to play against the Australian counterparts. He joined in the first season that featured former rugby league stars. He revealed that he lost his brother to a heart attack. His father also suffered from diabetes and asthma, while his mother died 2 years ago from complications of diabetes. His wife is Sienna and he has a 14-year-old son, Kava. He also revealed that Sienna is battling cancer, but she recovered 2 months later. In episode three, he scored a hat-trick against Ex-All Blacks and Sevens in Beach Rugby game.

In 2024, he returned for Match Fit: Union vs. League. He represented the League team despite having represented both codes. He revealed that he has worked at Wesley College as Director of Rugby and teacher's aide since last year. He is also the dorm parent in his night role. While Pita Alatini and Carlos Spencer went -15 for metabolic age vs. biological age for the best possible result, he, Clinton Toopi and Henry Fa'afili started out +15, which is the worst possible result. Despite this: He has great aerobic fitness and was able to control the pace on the vertical ski-erg machine, but ended up destroying them due to his strength. He was named a League captain for the final match as he made the most improvements in the league team and is the only player who is a dual-code international player.
