= David Pakieto =

NZ rugby league player & referee

Playing information
Club
| Years | Team | Pld | T | G | FG | P |
|---|---|---|---|---|---|---|
| 1986 | Otahuhu Leopards |

Refereeing information
| Years | Competition | Apps |
| 1999 | Tri Nations | 1 |
| 2000 | World Cup | 4 |

David Pakieto is a New Zealand former rugby league video referee and former referee. An international referee, Pakieto also controlled New Zealand Rugby League matches.

== Playing career ==
Pakieto was a junior with the Otahuhu Leopards and represented Auckland age group teams up to under-18 level. He played with the Leopards' premier side in 1986.

== Referee career ==
As New Zealand's top referee, Pakieto refereed in the 1999 Tri-Nations and at the 2000 World Cup.

Pakieto then became a video referee and was the New Zealand appointee in multiple international matches.

He later served as the Auckland Rugby League Referees president.
