= 2000 Rugby League World Cup =

12th Rugby League World Cup tournament

- Number of teams: 16
- Host countries: England; France; Ireland; Scotland; Wales
- Winner: Australia (9th title)
- Matches played: 31
- Attendance: 263,921 (8,514 per match)
- Top scorer: (Australia) Mat Rogers (70)
- Top try scorer: (Australia) Wendell Sailor (10)

The 2000 Rugby League World Cup was the twelfth World Cup for men’s national rugby league teams, held between 28 October and 25 November and hosted between the United Kingdom, Ireland and France. Australia won their ninth title by beating New Zealand 40-12 in the final at Old Trafford.

Following the success of the previous tournament, the World Cup was expanded to 16 teams and for the first time featured qualification rounds before the finals.

Alongside the men's tournament, it was also the same year when the inaugural Women's Rugby League World Cup was first played.

== Summary ==
Following the success of the 1995 Rugby League World Cup, organisers decided to expand the 2000 tournament to 16 teams, 15 were invited while seven emerging nations were invited into a qualifying tournament to determine the 16th place.

The millennium World Cup attracted a record sponsorship of over £1 million from title Lincoln Financial Group, who had also sponsored Great Britain's Tests against New Zealand the previous year. The tournament also made a £2 million profit, despite attracting small crowds.

Despite its financial success the 2000 World Cup was seen as a failure, with too many blow out score lines and the inclusion of New Zealand Māori team being invited alongside the New Zealand National team. Despite being the only team to have to qualify to play in the World Cup, Lebanon were criticised for consisting entirely of Australians of Lebanese origin, which led to derisory comments in the media. The tournament also attracted criticism of its lack of marketing and poor crowds.

France performed creditably and had healthy attendances in games they hosted, while the much-derided Lebanon team also proved the catalyst for domestic competition in that country.

== Qualifying ==
Six countries – Lebanon, the United States, Morocco, Canada, Italy and Japan – competed for one available place in the tournament. Lebanon defeated the United States 62–8 in the final play-off match.

== Teams ==
The 2000 World Cup tournament featured 16 teams:

Team	Captain	Coach
Australia	Brad Fittler	Chris Anderson
Cook Islands	Kevin Iro	(New Zealand) Stan Martin
England	Andy Farrell	John Kear
Fiji	Lote Tuqiri	(Australia) Don Furner
France	Fabien Devecchi	Gilles Dumas
Ireland	Terry O'Connor	(England) Steve O'Neill and (England) Andy Kelly
Lebanon	Darren Marroon	John Elias
New Zealand	Richie Barnett	Frank Endacott
Aotearoa Māori	Tawera Nikau	Cameron Bell
Papua New Guinea	Adrian Lam	(Australia) Bob Bennett
Russia	Ian Rubin	Evgeniy Klebanov
Samoa	Willie Poching	(New Zealand) Darrell Williams
Scotland	Danny Russell	(Australia) Shaun McRae
South Africa	Jamie Bloem	(New Zealand) Paul Matete
Tonga	Martin Masella	(Australia) Murray Hurst
Wales	Iestyn Harris	Clive Griffiths

== Venues ==
The games were played at various venues in England, Wales, Scotland, Ireland, France.

The Twickenham Stadium in London, the home of the English rugby union was the host stadium for the opening ceremony and match featuring hosts England and defending champions Australia.

(England) London	(Wales) Cardiff	(England) Trafford	(France) Toulouse	(England) Bolton
Twickenham Stadium	Millennium Stadium	Old Trafford (Venue of Final)	Stadium de Toulouse	Reebok Stadium
Capacity: 75,000	Capacity: 74,500	Capacity: 56,000	Capacity: 37,000	Capacity: 28,723
(England) Huddersfield	Locations of the 2000 Rugby League World Cup host venues in the United Kingdom Locations of the 2000 Rugby League World Cup host venues in the Republic of Ireland Locations of the 2000 Rugby League World Cup host venues in France			(England) Reading
McAlpine Stadium	Locations of the 2000 Rugby League World Cup host venues in the United Kingdom Locations of the 2000 Rugby League World Cup host venues in the Republic of Ireland Locations of the 2000 Rugby League World Cup host venues in France			Madejski Stadium
Capacity: 24,500	Locations of the 2000 Rugby League World Cup host venues in the United Kingdom Locations of the 2000 Rugby League World Cup host venues in the Republic of Ireland Locations of the 2000 Rugby League World Cup host venues in France			Capacity: 24,161
(England) Leeds	Locations of the 2000 Rugby League World Cup host venues in the United Kingdom Locations of the 2000 Rugby League World Cup host venues in the Republic of Ireland Locations of the 2000 Rugby League World Cup host venues in France			(England) Watford
Headingley	Locations of the 2000 Rugby League World Cup host venues in the United Kingdom Locations of the 2000 Rugby League World Cup host venues in the Republic of Ireland Locations of the 2000 Rugby League World Cup host venues in France			Vicarage Road
Capacity: 22,000	Locations of the 2000 Rugby League World Cup host venues in the United Kingdom Locations of the 2000 Rugby League World Cup host venues in the Republic of Ireland Locations of the 2000 Rugby League World Cup host venues in France			Capacity: 21,577
(France) Paris	Locations of the 2000 Rugby League World Cup host venues in the United Kingdom Locations of the 2000 Rugby League World Cup host venues in the Republic of Ireland Locations of the 2000 Rugby League World Cup host venues in France			(Scotland) Edinburgh
Stade Sébastien Charléty	Locations of the 2000 Rugby League World Cup host venues in the United Kingdom Locations of the 2000 Rugby League World Cup host venues in the Republic of Ireland Locations of the 2000 Rugby League World Cup host venues in France			Tynecastle Stadium
Capacity: 20,000	Locations of the 2000 Rugby League World Cup host venues in the United Kingdom Locations of the 2000 Rugby League World Cup host venues in the Republic of Ireland Locations of the 2000 Rugby League World Cup host venues in France			Capacity: 17,529
(England) St. Helens	Locations of the 2000 Rugby League World Cup host venues in the United Kingdom Locations of the 2000 Rugby League World Cup host venues in the Republic of Ireland Locations of the 2000 Rugby League World Cup host venues in France			(Northern Ireland) Belfast
Knowsley Road	Locations of the 2000 Rugby League World Cup host venues in the United Kingdom Locations of the 2000 Rugby League World Cup host venues in the Republic of Ireland Locations of the 2000 Rugby League World Cup host venues in France			Windsor Park
Capacity: 17,500	Locations of the 2000 Rugby League World Cup host venues in the United Kingdom Locations of the 2000 Rugby League World Cup host venues in the Republic of Ireland Locations of the 2000 Rugby League World Cup host venues in France			Capacity: 17,000
(England) Gloucester	Locations of the 2000 Rugby League World Cup host venues in the United Kingdom Locations of the 2000 Rugby League World Cup host venues in the Republic of Ireland Locations of the 2000 Rugby League World Cup host venues in France			(England) Widnes
Kingsholm Stadium	Locations of the 2000 Rugby League World Cup host venues in the United Kingdom Locations of the 2000 Rugby League World Cup host venues in the Republic of Ireland Locations of the 2000 Rugby League World Cup host venues in France			Autoquest Stadium
Capacity: 16,500	Locations of the 2000 Rugby League World Cup host venues in the United Kingdom Locations of the 2000 Rugby League World Cup host venues in the Republic of Ireland Locations of the 2000 Rugby League World Cup host venues in France			Capacity: 13,350
(France) Albi	Locations of the 2000 Rugby League World Cup host venues in the United Kingdom Locations of the 2000 Rugby League World Cup host venues in the Republic of Ireland Locations of the 2000 Rugby League World Cup host venues in France			(England) Gateshead
Stadium Municipal d'Albi	Locations of the 2000 Rugby League World Cup host venues in the United Kingdom Locations of the 2000 Rugby League World Cup host venues in the Republic of Ireland Locations of the 2000 Rugby League World Cup host venues in France			Gateshead International Stadium
Capacity: 13,058	Locations of the 2000 Rugby League World Cup host venues in the United Kingdom Locations of the 2000 Rugby League World Cup host venues in the Republic of Ireland Locations of the 2000 Rugby League World Cup host venues in France			Capacity: 11,800
(England) Castleford	Locations of the 2000 Rugby League World Cup host venues in the United Kingdom Locations of the 2000 Rugby League World Cup host venues in the Republic of Ireland Locations of the 2000 Rugby League World Cup host venues in France			(Wales) Llanelli
Wheldon Road	Locations of the 2000 Rugby League World Cup host venues in the United Kingdom Locations of the 2000 Rugby League World Cup host venues in the Republic of Ireland Locations of the 2000 Rugby League World Cup host venues in France			Stradey Park
Capacity: 11,743	Locations of the 2000 Rugby League World Cup host venues in the United Kingdom Locations of the 2000 Rugby League World Cup host venues in the Republic of Ireland Locations of the 2000 Rugby League World Cup host venues in France			Capacity: 10,800
(Wales) Wrexham	Locations of the 2000 Rugby League World Cup host venues in the United Kingdom Locations of the 2000 Rugby League World Cup host venues in the Republic of Ireland Locations of the 2000 Rugby League World Cup host venues in France			(England) Hull
Racecourse Ground	Locations of the 2000 Rugby League World Cup host venues in the United Kingdom Locations of the 2000 Rugby League World Cup host venues in the Republic of Ireland Locations of the 2000 Rugby League World Cup host venues in France			The Boulevard
Capacity: 10,771	Locations of the 2000 Rugby League World Cup host venues in the United Kingdom Locations of the 2000 Rugby League World Cup host venues in the Republic of Ireland Locations of the 2000 Rugby League World Cup host venues in France			Capacity: 10,500
(Scotland) Glasgow	(England) Workington	(France) Carcassonne	(Republic of Ireland) Dublin	(England) Barrow-in-Furness
Firhill Stadium	Derwent Park	Stade Albert Domec	Tolka Park	Craven Park
Capacity: 10,102	Capacity: 10,000	Capacity: 10,000	Capacity: 9,680	Capacity: 4,000

== Group stage ==
=== Group A ===
Pos	Team	Pld	W	D	L	PF	PA	PD	Pts	Qualification
1	Australia	3	3	0	0	198	14	+184	6	Advance to knockout stage
2	England	3	2	0	1	144	36	+108	4	Advance to knockout stage
3	Fiji	3	1	0	2	56	144	−88	2	
4	Russia	3	0	0	3	20	224	−204	0	

Source: Rugby League Project

28 October 2000
18:30 GMT (UTC±00:00)

England	2–22	Australia
Goals: Farrell (1/1)	Summary	Tries: Sailor (2), Gidley, MacDougall; Goals: Rogers (3/4)

Twickenham Stadium, London
Attendance: 33,758
Referee: David Pakieto (New Zealand)
Player of the Match: Brett Kimmorley (Australia)

29 October 2000

Fiji	38–12	Russia
Try: Vunivalu (3), Tuqiri (2), Kuraduadua, Sovatabua; Con: Tuqiri (5/7)	Summary	Try: Rullis, Ilyasov; Con: Zhiltsov (1/1); Mitrofanov (1/1)

Craven Park, Barrow-in-Furness
Attendance: 2,187
Referee: Russell Smith

1 November 2000

Australia	66–8	Fiji
Try: Rogers (4), Girdler (2), Kennedy (2), Hindmarsh, Barrett, MacDougall, Gidley; Con: Rogers (9/12)	Summary	Try: Cakacaka (m), Tuqiri (m); Con: ? (0/2)

Gateshead International Stadium, Gateshead
Attendance: 4,197
Referee: Robert Connolly

1 November 2000

England	76–4	Russia
Try: Sinfield (3), Jamie Peacock (2), Long (2), Rowley (2), Walker, Stephenson, Hay, Deacon, Pryce; Con: Farrell (5), Long (5)	Summary	Pen: Mitrofanov (2)

Knowsley Road, St Helens
Attendance: 5,736
Referee: Bill Shrimpton

4 November 2000

England	66–10	Fiji
Try: Jamie Peacock (3), Wellens (2), Rogers (2), Naylor, Hay, Radlinski, Smith, Farrell; Con: Farrell (9/12)	Summary	Try: Tuqiri (m), Navale (c), Con: Vunivalu (1/2)

Headingley Rugby Stadium, Leeds
Attendance: 10,052
Referee: Thierry Alibert

4 November 2000

Australia	110–4	Russia
Try: Sailor (4), Girdler (3), Croker (2), Hindmarsh (2), Barrett (2), Johns, Tallis, Fletcher, Webcke, MacDougall, Gidley; Con: Girdler (17/19)	Summary	Try: Matt Donovan; Con: Mikhail Mitrofanov (0/2)

The Boulevard, Hull
Attendance: 3,044
Referee: Stuart Cummings

=== Group B ===
Pos	Team	Pld	W	D	L	PF	PA	PD	Pts	Qualification
1	New Zealand	3	3	0	0	206	28	+178	6	Advance to knockout stage
2	Wales	3	2	0	1	80	86	−6	4	Advance to knockout stage
3	Lebanon	3	0	1	2	44	110	−66	1	
4	Cook Islands	3	0	1	2	38	144	−106	1	

Source: Rugby League Project

29 October 2000

New Zealand	64–0	Lebanon
Try: Jones (2), Carroll (2), Vainikolo (2), Talau (2), Barnett (2), Swain, Jellick; Con: Jones (6), Paul (2)

Kingsholm Stadium, Gloucester
Attendance: 2,496
Referee: Bill Harrigan

29 October 2000

Wales	38–6	Cook Islands
Try: Tassell (3), Jenkins, Briers, Cunningham; Con: Harris (6/6); Pen.: Harris (1/1)		Try: Temata; Con: Piakura (1/1)

Racecourse Ground, Wrexham
Attendance: 5,016
Referee: Thierry Alibert

2 November 2000

New Zealand	84–10	Cook Islands
Try: Vaealiki (2), Paul (2), Barnett (2), Lavea (2), Lauiti'iti, Vainikolo, Wiki, Cayless, Pongia, Vagana, Puletua; Con: Lavea (12/15)		Try: Noovao; Iro; Con: Piakura (1/2)

Madejski Stadium, Reading
Attendance: 3,982
Referee: Tim Mander

2 November 2000

Wales	24–22	Lebanon
Try: Harris (2), Davies, Cunningham, Sterling; Con: Harris (2/5)		Try: Saleh (2), Coorey; El Masri; Con: El Masri (3/4)

Stradey Park, Llanelli
Attendance: 1,497
Referee: David Pakieto

5 November 2000

Cook Islands	22–22	Lebanon
Try: Berryman (2), Toa, Joe; Con: Berryman (2); Piakura		Try: El Masri (2), Touma, Saleh; Con: El Masri (3/4)

Millennium Stadium, Cardiff
Attendance: 17,612
Referee: Bill Shrimpton

5 November 2000

Wales	18–58	New Zealand
Try: Briers, Atcheson, Farrell; Con: Harris (3/3)		Try: Vainikolo (3), Barnett (2), Lauiti'iti, Wiki, Vagana, Paul, Talau, Carroll; Con: Paul (5); Lavea (2)

Millennium Stadium, Cardiff
Attendance: 17,612
Referee: Russell Smith

=== Group C ===
Pos	Team	Pld	W	D	L	PF	PA	PD	Pts	Qualification
1	Papua New Guinea	3	3	0	0	69	42	+27	6	Advance to knockout stage
2	France	3	2	0	1	104	37	+67	4	Advance to knockout stage
3	Tonga	3	1	0	2	96	76	+20	2	
4	South Africa	3	0	0	3	24	138	−114	0	

Source: Rugby League Project

28 October 2000

Papua New Guinea	23–20	France
Tries: Bai, Krewanty, Buko, Lam. Goals: Buko, Wilshere 2. Drop Goals: Lam.		Tries: Benausse, Dekkiche, Hechiche 2. Goals: Banquet 2.

Charlety Stadium, Paris
Attendance: 7,498
Referee: Steve Ganson

28 October 2000

Tonga	66–18	South Africa
Try: Vaikona 5' (c); D. Mann 7' (c); Vaikona 20' (c); Liava'a ?' (m); Masella ?' (m); Moala ?' (m); E. Mann 44' (m); Vaikona 46' (m); Lomi 51' (c); Vaikona 55' (c); Kaufusi ?' (?); D. Mann ?' (?); Mason ?' (?); Con: Moala (4/9); Mason (1/1)		Try: Breytenbach 17' (m); Barnard ?' (c); Best ?' (c); Con: ? (0/1); Bloem (2/2); Pen: O'Shea (1/1)

Charlety Stadium, Paris
Attendance: 7,498
Referee: Darren Hopewell

1 November 2000

France	28–8	Tonga
Try: Banquet ?' (c); Sirvent ?' (c); Dulac 66' (m); Garcia ?' (c); Jampy ?' (c); Con: Banquet (4/5); Pen: Banquet (0/2)		Try: D. Fisi'iahi ?' (m); P. Fisi'iahi 60' (m); Con: Moala (0/2)

Stade d'Albert Domec, Carcassonne
Attendance: 10,288
Referee: Steve Clark

2 November 2000

Papua New Guinea	16–0	South Africa
Try: Aila 25' (c); Wilshere 31' (c); Paiyo 52' (m); Con: Wilshere (2/3)

Stadium de Toulouse, Toulouse
Attendance: 4,313
Referee: Darren Hopewell

5 November 2000

France	56–6	South Africa
Try: Cassin 8' (c); Banquet 21' (c); Cassin 35' (c); Guisset 38' (c); Jampy ?' (c); Jampy ?' (c); Jampy 53' (c); Sirvent ?' (c); Tallec ?' (c); Con: Banquet (9/9); Pen: Banquet (1/1) 18'		Try: De Villiers ?' (m); Con: ? (0/1); Pen: Bloem (1/1) ?'

Stadium Municipal d'Albi, Albi
Attendance: 7,969
Referee: Steve Clark

6 November 2000

Papua New Guinea	30–22	Tonga
Try: Mondo 19' (c); Gene 23' (m); Buko 35' (c); Karl ?' (m); Gene ?' (c); Con: Wiltshere (3/5); Pen: Wiltshere (2/2) 5', 42'		Try: Moala 10' (c); Mason 39' (c); Moala ?' (m); Vaikona ?' (m); Con: Moala (2/2); Pen: Moala (1/1) 7'

Saint-Esteve, Perpignan
Attendance: 3,666
Referee: Steve Ganson

=== Group D ===
Pos	Team	Pld	W	D	L	PF	PA	PD	Pts	Qualification
1	Ireland	3	3	0	0	78	38	+40	6	Advance to knockout stage
2	Samoa	3	2	0	1	57	58	−1	4	Advance to knockout stage
3	Aotearoa Māori	3	1	0	2	49	67	−18	2	
4	Scotland	3	0	0	3	34	55	−21	0	

Source: Rugby League Project

28 October 2000

Ireland	30–16	Samoa
Tries: Joynt, Ricketson, Eagar, Carney, Prescott. Goals: Prescott 5		Tries: Leauma, Milford, Betham. Goals: Geros 2.

Windsor Park, Belfast
Attendance: 3,207
Referee: Tim Mander
Player of the Match: Barrie McDermott

29 October 2000

Scotland	16–17	Aotearoa Māori
Tries: Penny, Maiden, Bell; Goals: Mackay, Crowther		Tries: Toopi 2, Kidwell; Goals: Ngamu 2 Drop Goals: Ngamu

Firhill Stadium, Glasgow
Attendance: 2,008
Referee: Stuart Cummings

1 November 2000

Ireland	18–6	Scotland
Tries: Sheridan, Withers. Goals: Prescott 5.		Tries: Arnold. Goals: Crowther.

Tolka Park, Dublin
Attendance: 1,782
Referee: Russell Smith

1 November 2000

Samoa	21–16	Aotearoa Māori
Tries: Faafili 2, W Swann, Milford. Goals: Poching 2.		Tries: Mathews, Nelson, Rauhihi. Goals: Goodwin 2.

Derwent Park, Workington
Attendance: 4,107
Referee: Bill Harrigan

4 November 2000

Ireland	30–16	Aotearoa Māori

Tolka Park, Dublin
Attendance: 3,164
Referee: Bill Harrigan

5 November 2000

Scotland	12–20	Samoa

Tynecastle Stadium, Edinburgh
Attendance: 1,579
Referee: David Pakieto

== Knockout stage ==
The top 2 teams from each pool advanced to the quarter-finals.

Quarter-finals
11 November – Leeds
Ireland	16
England	26
12 November – Castleford
New Zealand	54
France	6
11 November – Watford
Australia	66
Samoa	10
12 November – Widnes
Papua New Guinea	8
Wales	22

Semi-finals
18 November – Bolton
England	6
New Zealand	49
19 November – Huddersfield
Australia	46
Wales	22

Final
25 November – Manchester
New Zealand	12
Australia	40

=== Quarter-finals ===
11 November 2000

Australia	66–10	Samoa
	Summary

Vicarage Road, Watford
Attendance: 5,404
Referee: Stuart Cummings (England)

11 November 2000
18:30 GMT (UTC±00:00)

England	26–16	Ireland
	Summary

Headingley Rugby Stadium, Leeds
Attendance: 15,405
Referee: Tim Mander (Australia)

12 November 2000

New Zealand	54–6	France
	Summary

Mend-a-Hose Jungle, Castleford
Attendance: 5,158
Referee: Bill Harrigan (Australia)

12 November 2000

Wales	22–8	Papua New Guinea
	Summary

Auto Quest Stadium, Widnes
Attendance: 5,211
Referee: David Pakieto (New Zealand)

=== Semi-finals ===
18 November 2000

New Zealand	49–6	England
	Summary

Reebok Stadium, Bolton
Attendance: 16,032
Referee: Tim Mander (Australia)
Player of the Match: Stephen Kearney (New Zealand)

19 November 2000

Australia	46–22	Wales
	Summary

McAlpine Stadium, Huddersfield
Attendance: 8,114
Referee: Russell Smith (England)

=== Final ===
2000 Rugby League World Cup Final

Saturday, 25 November
15:00 GMT (UTC±00:00)

Australia	40 – 12	New Zealand
Tries: 7 Sailor 66', 69'; Gidley 26'; Hindmarsh 46'; Lockyer 53'; Fittler 74'; Barrett 76'; Goals: 6 Rogers (6/7)	1st: 6–0; 2nd: 34–12; Report	Tries: 2 Vainikolo 50'; Carroll 57'; Goals: 2 H. Paul (2/2)

Old Trafford, Manchester
Attendance: 44,329
Referee: Stuart Cummings (England)
Video referee: Gerry Kershaw
Player of the Match: Wendell Sailor

== Try scorers ==
10

- (Australia) Wendell Sailor

9

- (New Zealand) Lesley Vainikolo

6

- (Australia) Ryan Girdler
- (England) Jamie Peacock
- (New Zealand) Richie Barnett
- (New Zealand) Willie Talau

5

- (Australia) Bryan Fletcher
- (Australia) Adam MacDougall
- (New Zealand) Robbie Paul

4

- (Australia) Trent Barrett
- (Australia) Brad Fittler
- (Australia) Matthew Gidley
- (Australia) Nathan Hindmarsh
- (Australia) Mat Rogers
- (Fiji) Lote Tuqiri
- (France) Pascal Jampy
- (New Zealand) Tonie Carroll
- (Samoa) Brian Leauma
- (Tonga) Tevita Vaikona
- (Wales) Lee Briers
- (Wales) Kris Tassell

3

- (Australia) Andrew Johns
- (Australia) Ben Kennedy
- (Australia) Darren Lockyer
- (England) Kevin Sinfield
- (England) Tony Smith
- (Fiji) Atunasia Vunivialu
- (France) Claude Sirvent
- (Ireland) Michael Withers
- (Lebanon) Hazem El Masri
- (Lebanon) Hassan Saleh
- (New Zealand) Nigel Vagana
- (New Zealand) Ruben Wiki
- (Samoa) Shane Laloata
- (Samoa) Laloa Milford
- (Tonga) Fifita Moala

2

- (Australia) Jason Croker
- (Australia) Scott Hill
- (Cook Islands) Steve Berryman
- (England) Andy Hay
- (England) Sean Long
- (England) Darren Rogers
- (England) Paul Rowley
- (England) Chev Walker
- (England) Paul Wellens
- (France) Frédéric Banquet
- (France) Jean-Emmanuel Cassin
- (France) Rachid Hechiche
- (Ireland) Brian Carney
- (Ireland) Ryan Sheridan
- (New Zealand) Brian Jellick
- (New Zealand) Stacey Jones
- (New Zealand) Stephen Kearney
- (New Zealand) Ali Lauiti'iti
- (New Zealand) Tasesa Lavea
- (New Zealand) Quentin Pongia
- (New Zealand) Logan Swann
- (New Zealand) David Vaealiki
- (Māori people) Boycie Nelson
- (Māori people) Clinton Toopi
- (Papua New Guinea) David Buko
- (Papua New Guinea) Stanley Gene
- (Papua New Guinea) John Wilshere
- (Samoa) Henry Fa'afili
- (Samoa) David Solomona
- (Tonga) Duane Mann
- (Tonga) Willie Mason
- (Wales) Iestyn Harris
- (Wales) Wes Davies

1

- (Australia) Craig Gower
- (Australia) Brett Kimmorley
- (Australia) Gorden Tallis
- (Australia) Shane Webcke
- (Cook Islands) Kevin Iro
- (Cook Islands) Leroy Joe
- (Cook Islands) Meti Noovao
- (Cook Islands) Karl Temata
- (Cook Islands) Tiri Toa
- (England) Paul Deacon
- (England) Andy Farrell
- (England) Scott Naylor
- (England) Leon Pryce
- (England) Kris Radlinski
- (England) Keith Senior
- (England) Francis Stephenson
- (France) Patrice Benausse
- (France) Yacine Dekkiche
- (France) Arnaud Dulac
- (France) Jean-Marc Garcia
- (France) Jérôme Guisset
- (France) Julien Rinaldi
- (France) Gael Tallec
- (Fiji) Tabua Cakacaka
- (Fiji) Jone Kuraduadua
- (Fiji) Eparama Navale
- (Fiji) Waisale Sovatabua
- (Ireland) David Barnhill
- (Ireland) Martin Crompton
- (Ireland) Michael Eagar
- (Ireland) Mark Forster
- (Ireland) Chris Joynt
- (Ireland) Tommy Martyn
- (Ireland) Steve Prescott
- (Ireland) Luke Ricketson
- (Lebanon) Michael Coorey
- (Lebanon) Travis Touma
- (New Zealand) Richie Blackmore
- (New Zealand) Nathan Cayless
- (New Zealand) Henry Paul
- (New Zealand) Tony Puletua
- (New Zealand) Matt Rua
- (New Zealand) Craig Smith
- (Māori people) David Kidwell
- (Māori people) Wairangi Koopu
- (Māori people) Steve Matthews
- (Māori people) Paul Rauhihi
- (Māori people) Hare Te Rangi
- (Papua New Guinea) Eddie Aila
- (Papua New Guinea) Marcus Bai
- (Papua New Guinea) Raymond Karl
- (Papua New Guinea) Alex Krewanty
- (Papua New Guinea) Adrian Lam
- (Papua New Guinea) Michael Mondo
- (Papua New Guinea) Elias Paiyo
- (Papua New Guinea) Lucas Solbat
- (Russia) Matt Donovan
- (Russia) Robert Ilyasov
- (Russia) Joel Rullis
- (Samoa) Monty Betham
- (Samoa) Willie Swann
- (Scotland) Danny Arnold
- (Scotland) Geoff Bell
- (Scotland) David Maiden
- (Scotland) Lee Penny
- (Scotland) Scott Rhodes
- (Scotland) Adrian Vowles
- (Tonga) Daniel Foster
- (Tonga) Paul Fisiiahi
- (Tonga) David Fisiiahi
- (Tonga) Lipina Kaufusi
- (Tonga) Talite Liava'a
- (Tonga) Nelson Lomi
- (Tonga) Esau Mann
- (Tonga) Martin Masella
- (Tonga) Willie Wolfgramm
- (South Africa) Leon Barnard
- (South Africa) Brian Best
- (South Africa) Coenraad Breytenbach
- (South Africa) Quinton De Villiers
- (Wales) Paul Atcheson
- (Wales) Jason Critchley
- (Wales) Keiron Cunningham
- (Wales) Anthony Farrell
- (Wales) Mick Jenkins
- (Wales) Paul Sterling
- (Wales) Ian Watson
