= Tonie Carroll =

New Zealand-Australian rugby league footballer

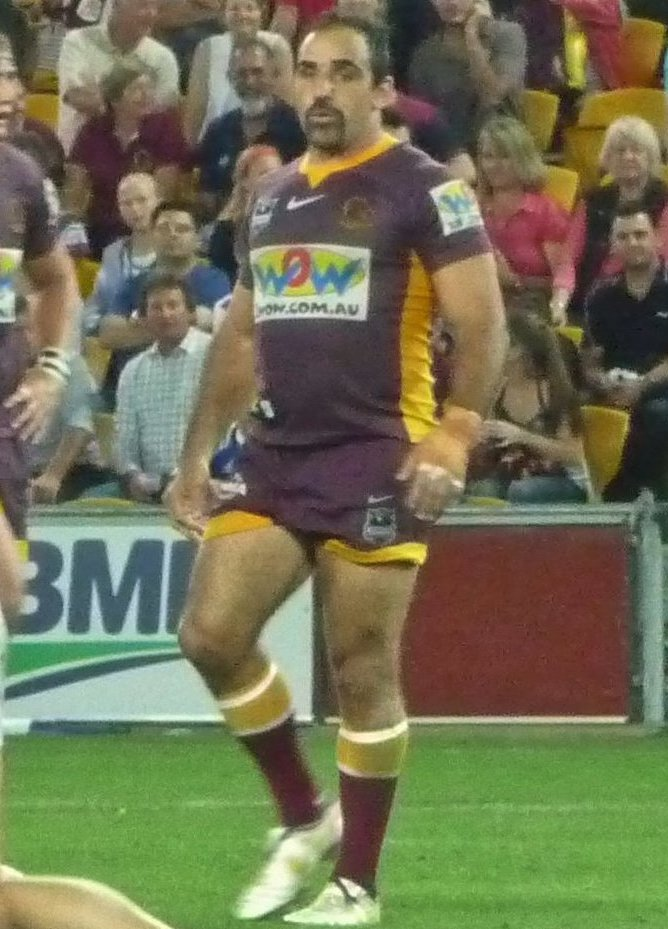

Personal information
- Full name: Tonie James Carroll
- Born: 17 February 1976 (age 49); Christchurch, New Zealand

Playing information
- Height: 186 cm (6 ft 1 in)
- Weight: 103 kg (16 st 3 lb)
- Position: Lock, Centre, Second-row
Club
| Years | Team | Pld | T | G | FG | P |
|---|---|---|---|---|---|---|
| 1996–00 | Brisbane Broncos | 97 | 32 | 0 | 0 | 128 |
| 2001–02 | Leeds Rhinos | 50 | 31 | 0 | 0 | 124 |
| 2003–09 | Brisbane Broncos | 130 | 26 | 0 | 0 | 104 |
| | Total | 277 | 89 | 0 | 0 | 356 |
Representative
| Years | Team | Pld | T | G | FG | P |
| 1997 | Queensland (SL) | 2 | 1 | 0 | 0 | 4 |
| 1998–07 | Queensland | 18 | 1 | 0 | 0 | 4 |
| 2000 | New Zealand | 5 | 4 | 0 | 0 | 16 |
| 2004–05 | Australia | 7 | 2 | 0 | 0 | 8 |

Tonie Carroll (born 17 February 1976) is a former professional rugby league footballer who played in the 1990s and 2000s. An Australian and New Zealand international and Queensland State of Origin representative, he played for the Brisbane Broncos of the NRL and Leeds Rhinos in the Super League. Carroll retired from playing at the end of 2008, before making a brief mid-season comeback to the Broncos in 2009. Carroll was a utility player, appearing at centre, five-eighth, second-row, or lock.

== Playing career ==
While attending Beenleigh State High School, Carroll played for the Waterford Demons. Nicknamed 'Tunza', he started his Australian club career with Brisbane's Easts Tigers team before being picked up by the Broncos.

=== Brisbane Broncos ===
Carroll made his first grade début for Brisbane against the North Queensland Cowboys at ANZ Stadium on 21 April 1996 and went on to win the 1996 Brisbane Broncos season's rookie of the year award. Despite his Kiwi background, Carroll was selected to represent Queensland in the Super League Tri-series. He made his State of Origin début for the Maroons from the interchange bench in the 1998 series, scoring a crucial match-winning try on debut in a game Queensland would win by 1 point with a Darren Lockyer conversion after the siren. Carroll became best known for his devastating defensive hits and scored a try in Brisbane's 1998 NRL Grand Final victory to claim his second premiership ring.

Carroll played at centre for the Broncos in their 2000 NRL grand final win over the Sydney Roosters. He then created controversy when, after first representing Queensland then representing New Zealand in the 2000 World Cup (scoring a try in the final against Australia), he played for the Australian side, due to his having played State of Origin. When selected for the Kangaroos in 2004s Tri-Nations competition, Carroll became the first player in 90 years (since Bill Kelly in 1914) to play for both New Zealand and Australia. After winning a 3rd premiership with the Broncos at the end of the 2000 season, Carroll left Australia to play with the Leeds Rhinos.

=== Leeds Rhinos ===
Carroll finished his first season in the Super League as top try-scorer for Leeds with 23 tries in 28 games, including hat-tricks in consecutive games. This earned him a place in the centres in 2001's Super League Dream Team.

The following year was a frustrating one for Carroll as he struggled with injury, however he still managed 22 appearances, scoring eight tries. After two seasons at the Rhinos he returned to the Broncos.

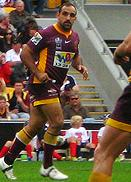
Carroll playing for the Broncos in 2008

=== Return to Brisbane ===
Carroll returned to the Broncos in 2003. Carroll was selected in the Australian team to go and compete in the end of season 2004 Rugby League Tri-Nations tournament. In the final against Great Britain he played at lock forward in the Kangaroos' 44–4 victory.

Carroll's leg was injured when playing at lock forward in the 2006 NRL Grand Final against Melbourne. Despite limping, he refused to leave the field and helped Brisbane to victory and another premiership. As 2006 NRL Premiers, the Brisbane Broncos travelled to England to face 2006 Super League champions, St Helens R.F.C. in the 2007 World Club Challenge. Carroll played at lock forward in the Broncos' 14–18 loss.

During the 2007 NRL season at the Broncos' 20-year anniversary celebration, the club announced a list of the 20 best players to play for them to date which included Carroll. In 2007, Broncos coach Wayne Bennett pulled a surprise selection by naming Carroll at five-eighth left vacant due to the season ending knee injury to captain Darren Lockyer, a position he had only played for 50 minutes in his entire career, opting for Carroll ahead of other options such as, Joel Moon, Karmichael Hunt, Shane Perry and Greg Eastwood.

Carroll retired at the end of 2008 NRL season. However, he returned in July 2009 after the Broncos suffered a series of injuries, before retiring conclusively at the end of the season.

== Statistics ==
| Year | Team | Games | Tries | Pts |
|---|---|---|---|---|
| 1996 | Brisbane Broncos | 7 | 4 | 16 |
| 1997 | Brisbane Broncos | 19 | 6 | 24 |
| 1998 | Brisbane Broncos | 19 | 4 | 16 |
| 1999 | Brisbane Broncos | 19 | 8 | 32 |
| 2000 | Brisbane Broncos | 25 | 7 | 28 |
| 2001 | Leeds | 28 | 23 | 92 |
| 2002 | Leeds | 22 | 8 | 32 |
| 2003 | Brisbane Broncos | 20 | 6 | 24 |
| 2004 | Brisbane Broncos | 21 | 5 | 20 |
| 2005 | Brisbane Broncos | 16 | 3 | 12 |
| 2006 | Brisbane Broncos | 21 | 1 | 4 |
| 2007 | Brisbane Broncos | 18 | 7 | 28 |
| 2008 | Brisbane Broncos | 22 | 4 | 16 |
| 2009 | Brisbane Broncos | 11 | | |
| | Totals | 277 | 89 | 356 |
