= Matthew Gidley =

Australia international rugby league footballer

Matt Gidley
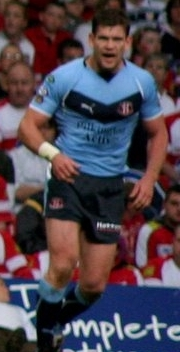

Personal information
- Full name: Matthew Gidley
- Born: 1 July 1977 (age 49) Newcastle, New South Wales, Australia

Playing information
- Height: 186 cm (6 ft 1 in)
- Weight: 94 kg (14 st 11 lb)
- Position: Centre, Five-eighth
Club
Years	Team	Pld	T	G	FG	P
1996–06	Newcastle Knights	222	69	0	1	273
2007–10	St Helens	124	48	6	0	204
	Total	346	117	6	1	477
Representative
Years	Team	Pld	T	G	FG	P
1999–04	Australia	17	11	0	0	44
2000–04	New South Wales	11	5	0	0	20
1997–05	Country Origin	2	0	0	1	1
- Relatives: Kurt Gidley (brother)

Matthew "Matt" Gidley (born 1 July 1977) is an Australian former professional rugby league footballer and administrator. Gidley played for the Newcastle Knights in the ARL Premiership and the NRL, and St Helens in the Super League, and for New South Wales in the State of Origin series and Australia at international level. He is also the former CEO of Football Operations at Newcastle.

== Background ==
Gidley was born in Newcastle, New South Wales, Australia. Matt is the older brother of the former Newcastle Knights and Warrington Wolves halfback Kurt Gidley.

Playing as a youngster in the Newcastle Rugby League for the Wests club, While attending Glendale High School, Gidley played for the Australian Schoolboys team in 1995.

== Playing career ==
=== Newcastle ===
Gidley had played all his junior football in the five-eighth position, however with Matthew Johns taking up the position in the Knights line up, he slotted in to right centre. Gidley was selected for the Australian team to compete in the end of season 1999 Rugby League Tri-Nations tournament. In the final against New Zealand, he played at centre in the Kangaroos' 22-20 victory. Gidley played at centre for Newcastle in their 2001 NRL grand final victory against the Parramatta Eels. At the end of the 2001 NRL season, he went on the 2001 Kangaroo tour. Having won the 2001 NRL Premiership, the Knights travelled to England to play the 2002 World Club Challenge against Super League champions, the Bradford Bulls. Gidley played at centre and scored a try in Newcastle's loss.

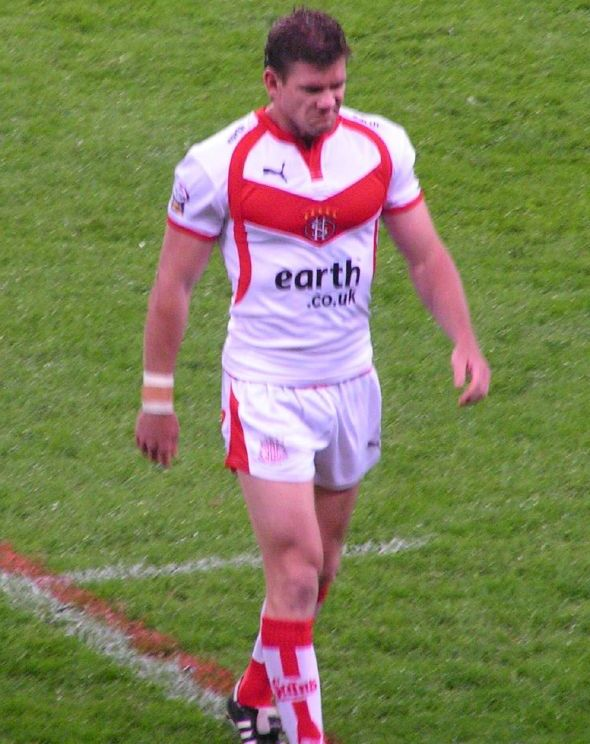
Gidley playing for St Helens in 2007

Gidley became famous for his wing/centre combination with former Knight Timana Tahu. A common play was for the ball to be sent out to the right side of the field where Gidley would run, draw one or two players in before doing the famous Gidley flick pass to Tahu or placing a grubber kick down the line. This play was used at both club and representative level.

2006 saw a rejuvenation of sorts for Gidley seeing him recapture some of his old magic flick pass play with Knights winger Brian Carney. In 2006, Gidley retired from representative football, aiming to focus on playing well at club level. This move was questionable as it was right before the annual City vs Country Origin clash, where many thought Gidley was going to make the Country side in the centre position.

He became only the 4th Newcastle Knight to play more than 200 career games.

=== St Helens ===
Gidley joined English club St Helens in the Super League as a replacement for Jamie Lyon in 2007 when Lyon returned to Australia with the Manly-Warringah Sea Eagles. His first match for the English club was their victory in the 2007 World Club Challenge over the Brisbane Broncos.

He played in the 2007 Challenge Cup Final victory over the Catalans Dragons at Wembley Stadium.

Gidley was named in the Super League Dream Team for 2008's Super League XIII.

He played in the 2008 Super League Grand Final defeat by the Leeds Rhinos.

He played in the 2009 Super League Grand Final defeat by the Leeds Rhinos at Old Trafford.

He then put pen to paper on a one-year contract to keep him at Knowsley Road for 2010.

== Administration career ==
In 2011, Gidley returned to the Newcastle Knights as the Business Development Manager before being appointed the CEO of Football Operations in June 2011 by the new owners, Hunter Sports Group. Meanwhile, his younger brother Kurt was club captain.

He stepped down as CEO on 1 November 2017.
