= Henry Paul (rugby) =

Rugby league and rugby union footballer

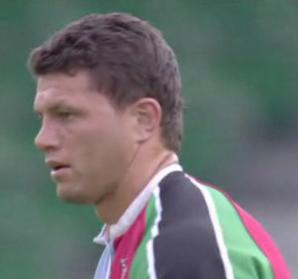

Personal information
- Full name: Henry Rangi Paul
- Born: 10 February 1974 (age 52) Tokoroa, New Zealand
- Height: 5 ft 11 in (1.80 m)
- Weight: 15 st 3 lb (97 kg)

Playing information

Rugby league
- Position: Stand-off, Loose forward
Club
Years	Team	Pld	T	G	FG	P
	Te Atatu Roosters
	Waitakere City Raiders
1993–94	Wakefield Trinity	24	7	40	1	109
1994–98	Wigan	147	78	119	0	550
1999–01	Bradford Bulls	100	32	416	7	967
2006–08	Harlequins RL	66	10	105	2	252
	Total	337	127	680	10	1878
Representative
Years	Team	Pld	T	G	FG	P
1995–01	New Zealand	24	4	52	1	121

Rugby union
- Position: Inside centre
Club
Years	Team	Pld	T	G	FG	P
1996	Bath	9	5	0	0	25
2001–06	Gloucester	116	20	357	2	802
2008–10	Leeds Carnegie	37	2	3	16	16
2010–11	Rotherham	5	0	0	0	0
	Total	167	27	360	18	843
Representative
Years	Team	Pld	T	G	FG	P
2002–04	England	6	0	3	0	6
	England sevens

Coaching information
Representative
Years	Team	Gms	W	D	L	W%
2020	Canada 7s
- Relatives: Robbie Hunter-Paul (brother)

Medal record

Men's rugby sevens

Representing England

Commonwealth Games
Silver medal – second place	2006 Melbourne	Team competition

Henry Rangi Paul (born 10 February 1974) is a rugby union coach and former rugby league and rugby union player. A dual-code international, Paul won 24 caps for New Zealand in rugby league and 6 for England in rugby union, as well as rugby sevens. Paul played as a loose forward, stand-off, fullback, and occasionally as a hooker, and as a centre and fly-half in rugby union.

He holds the record for kicking the most goals in a Super League season, with 178 for Bradford in 2001, and the record for the most goals in a game, 14, for Bradford in 2000. He is the brother of former New Zealand rugby league international Robbie Hunter-Paul.

== Playing career ==
Born in Tokoroa, New Zealand, Paul started playing rugby union at the age of three for Ponsonby Rugby Football Club and then rugby league for the Te Atatu Roosters. Later, during his time at Rutherford High School (1990), he led his team to break many Auckland club rugby league team and individual records. The following year, Paul moved to the Point Chevalier Pirates.

In the 1992 season he returned to Te Atatū, debuting in their senior premier team at 18 years of age, making the Auckland Rugby League Finals. That off season, Paul was selected as a utility player for the under-19 Auckland side, playing a major part in his team winning the national tournament. Following that success, Paul was selected as the Junior Kiwis captain to tour England that same off season.

Paul led by example when his team looked "out of sorts", guiding them to memorable victories against their Great Britain counterparts. His form was so inspiring that he earned full New Zealand representative honours on the same tour, when the senior team the (New Zealand Kiwis) hit an injury crisis on a corresponding tour of Britain. Paul, at just 18 years of age, made his test début as a substitute against France.

=== Wakefield Trinity ===
Paul's form on the Junior, and then subsequently New Zealand team tour, did not go unnoticed by scouts in England and in the off season of 1993/94 he joined Wakefield Trinity of the English Rugby Football League Championship.

=== Return to New Zealand ===
He returned to New Zealand for the 1994 season, playing five matches for the Waitakere City Raiders in the new Lion Red Cup. He originally signed for the new Auckland Warriors club who were to enter the Australian Rugby League in 1995 but they released him as part of a deal that allowed Andy Platt to join Auckland from Wigan.

=== Wigan Warriors ===
Paul joined Wigan Warriors for the 1994–95 season and quickly established himself in the squad. At the end of Super League's first season, he was named at stand-off half in the 1996 Super League Dream Team. He played at stand-off half back for Wigan Warriors in their 1998 Super League Grand Final victory against Leeds Rhinos.

Paul played fullback in Wigan's 40–10 victory over Warrington in the 1994–95 Regal Trophy final on 28 January 1995, and played stand-off, and scored two tries and 4-conversions in the 25–16 victory over St. Helens in the 1995–96 Regal Trophy on 13 January 1996.

=== Bradford Bulls ===
In September 1998, at the end of his contract, he moved to the Bradford Bulls.

Paul played for Bradford Bulls at stand-off half back and scored his team's sole try and goal in the 1999 Super League Grand Final which was lost to St. Helens. Paul scored one of the most famous tries in Super League, running from 60 metres, scoring the first try of the 1999 Super League Grand Final with one boot.

Paul was selected for the New Zealand team to compete in the end of season 1999 Rugby League Tri-Nations tournament. In the final against Australia he partnered his brother Robbie in the halves, kicking six goals in the Kiwis' 22–20 loss. He helped beat his former club Wigan in the 2001 Super League Grand Final. When he was at Bradford he set a goalkicking record for consecutive goals (35), as well as for points in a season at the club.

He won the Lance Todd Trophy for his performance in the 2000 Challenge Cup victory over the Leeds Rhinos.

Paul played for the Bradford Bulls as his brother Robbie's halves partner, kicking four goals and one drop goal in their 2001 Super League Grand Final victory against the Wigan Warriors.

Paul still holds the record for kicking the most goals in a Super League season with 178 for Bradford in 2001. He also still holds the record for the most goals ever scored in a game, being 14, from Bradford's 96 – 16 win against Salford in 2000.

=== International rugby league ===
In international rugby league he received 23 caps for New Zealand between 1995 and 2001, competing in the 1995 and 2000 Rugby League World Cups. Upon his return from rugby union in 2006 he qualified for both New Zealand and Great Britain.

=== Gloucester (rugby union) ===
Paul spoke to National Rugby League club the Canterbury Bulldogs and Super 12 clubs the Auckland Blues and the Waikato Chiefs. He was eventually tempted away from the Bradford Bulls to play rugby union for Gloucester, by Philippe Saint-André and Tom Walkinshaw.

He had a dream debut for Gloucester, scoring 28 points against Caerphilly. Paul began a four-year contract at Kingsholm in 2001 and won an England A national squad selection after just one game for the Cherry and Whites.

He was linked with a return his former club the Bradford Bulls, the Widnes Vikings and a move to NRL club the Canberra Raiders and a reunion with former coach at Bradford Matthew Elliott.

Having experimented with being a fullback and fly-half he settled into the inside centre position and his long passing stood well with Gloucester's style of play. He had his best year with Gloucester Rugby in 2004 when he won the club's season ticket holders' Player of the Year award and was also nominated for the Zurich Premiership Player of the Year award alongside Bruce Reihana, Mark Robinson, Simon Shaw and Mark van Gisbergen. Whilst at Gloucester he started in the 2002 Zurich Championship Final (the year before winning the play-offs constituted winning the English title) in which Gloucester defeated Bristol Rugby, and the 2003 Powergen Cup Final in which Gloucester defeated Northampton Saints.

=== England national team and sevens ===
With his switch to rugby union, he decided to play for England rather than New Zealand. Although he was born in New Zealand, he qualified for England through his Liverpudlian grandfather.

He won his first England cap as a replacement against France in the 2002 Six Nations Championship, but only managed to win a handful of caps thereafter, mostly during the 2004 Six Nations Championship, coming off the bench in Rome and at Murrayfield. He was also considered Man of the Match for England A against France A in March 2004 – with five penalties and a conversion. Paul's sixth and final England cap came in an Autumn International game against Australia. Paul's error-strewn performance resulted in his being substituted after just 24 minutes on the pitch. He never played for England again.

He excelled for the England Sevens side and was a member of the 2002 Commonwealth Games and 2006 Commonwealth Games squads, winning a silver medal in 2006. Paul also was the acting captain of England Sevens when it won the USA Sevens tournament in 2006 and was part of the only Rugby 7s squad to win the Hong Kong 7s with him being awarded player of the tournament. England 7s have failed to win in Hong Kong since their 2002 victory.

He was also a member of the England A team that won the 2003 Churchill Cup in Canada and returned there again on the 2004 Churchill Cup tour.

=== Harlequins RL ===
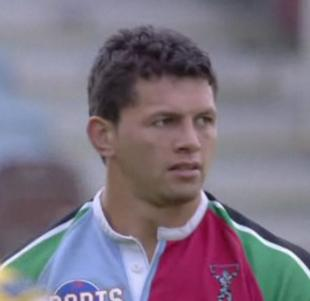
Paul in action for Harlequins RL

On 27 April 2006, Paul agreed a move back to rugby league joining Harlequins RL. The London side beat off competition from the Penrith Panthers to secure his signature.

His brother Robbie Paul played rugby league for Salford City Reds, having played with Paul at Bradford Bulls before a spell at Huddersfield Giants. Paul faced Robbie in his first game back in 2006's Super League XI on 29 April 2006.

==== Man of Steel Awards controversy ====
In 2007 Paul appeared drunk at the European Super League's Man of Steel Award's dinner. Paul slurred his acceptance speech when he received the Frontline Fairplay Index Award, awarded for good behaviour on the field, on behalf of the club. and subsequently apologised for his actions.

=== Leeds Carnegie ===
In 2008, Paul was linked with a return to rugby union with Leeds Carnegie. But the move was initially seen as unlikely due to the team being relegated from the 2007–08 English Premiership.

The 34-year-old switched codes and joined Leeds Carnegie's National League 1 campaign at the end of 2008's Super League XIII. Henry played at centre and fly-half for the two years at Carnegie. While in the RFU Championship he captained the side to their biggest victory in Carnegie history against Manchester and captained the side a numerous times, getting Man of the Match on several occasions. He helped Carnegie get promoted to the Premiership. Paul stayed with the side for one more year in the premiership before leaving the team to take up a coaching role as assistant coach for Russia's national 15's team.

=== Rotherham Titans ===
In 2010, Paul signed for RFU Championship side the Rotherham Titans. on a part-time basis.

Paul did not stay long at the club due to work commitments with Russia putting him out of the country for most of the year.

== Coaching career ==
Paul was released from Leeds in 2010 to embark on his coaching career as he signed up as the assistant coach of Russia.

Paul started his role coaching Russia at the 2010 Churchill Cup in the United States. He then coached them during the 2010–12 European Nations Cup First Division and at the 2011 Churchill Cup held in England, coming close against Italy A and the United States.

Paul took the side to the 2011 Rugby World Cup with Kingsley Jones as head coach. After two years with the Russian 15s team, Paul was appointed rugby 7s coach. After almost 4 years with Russia, Paul left to undertake a teaching role.

Paul then took a role as Rugby Programmes Manager for Queen Ethelburga's School in York for two years. Queen Ethelburga's achieved their greatest rugby success in these two years winning the British Colleges National Cup and making it to the Semi-Finals of the Rosslyn Park 7s in 2015. Paul continued his national coaching experience during this time however, coaching India's Men and Women's 15s and 7s teams for various tournaments during this time.

Paul left Queen Ethelburga's to move to be with his now wife in Dubai, United Arab Emirates taking up the role of Head Coach of the Jebel Ali Dragons in July 2016 and also being appointed Director of Rugby of the club in 2017. The club obtained their greatest success in years in the first year of Paul's coaching, with them making both the West Asia Premiership final and the UAE Premiership Final. Despite not winning either of the finals the club was crowned West Asia Premiership winners in March 2018 with Paul also being awarded coach of the season.

=== Canada ===
Paul was asked to assist the Canadian rugby team in February 2018 during the America's Rugby Championship and his performance secured him a permanent role as assistant coach of Canada Rugby alongside head coach Kingsley Jones in May 2018. The Jebel Ali Dragons Chairman Stuart Quinn said he was thrilled for Paul, despite the fact that they meant they were losing "the best coach in the region".

Paul was the 15s assistant coach for over a year helping Canada qualify for the 2019 Rugby World Cup in Japan. Paul was then asked to act as interim Canada Rugby Sevens coach following the departure of coach Damian McGrath in May 2019, coaching the team for a month before taking them to the London and Paris Sevens. Despite Paul confirming the goal was to test players for the up-and-coming qualifiers for the Olympics in the Cayman Islands, Paul's team succeeded in getting to the cup quarter finals in London and winning the Challenge Cup in Paris, achieving the team's biggest success in the 2018/19 series. Paul then took the team to the Cayman Islands where they qualified for the 2020 Olympic Games in Japan in an undefeated tournament.

Paul's "interim" status was removed and he was appointed head coach at the start of the 2019 7's series and successfully coached the team for the 2019/2020 season. Canada achieve a bronze medal in the Vancouver 7's after narrowly missing out on the final due to a last second try from Australia. Canada went on to defeat South Africa however, the first time in seven years, to get their first medal ever at their home tournament.
