= Australian Schoolboys rugby league team =

National junior sports team

Australian Schoolboys
Team information
- Nickname: The Kangaroos
- Governing body: Australian Rugby League
- Region: Oceania
- Head coach: (Australia) Adam Sargent-Wilson

Uniforms
First colours

Team results
- First game
- East Lancashire 0–30 Australia (England, 1972)
- Biggest win
- England Colleges 0–92 Australia (Kingston Park, Newcastle, England; 26 November 2018)
- Biggest defeat
- Australia 8–46 Junior Kiwis (New Zealand) (Kougari Oval, Wynnum, Australia; 30 July 2005)

The Australian Schoolboys rugby league team is the national rugby league football team for secondary school students in Australia.

The team competes against counterparts in New Zealand, known as the Junior Kiwis, England, Wales and France amongst others. Started in 1972, the Australian Schoolboys have produced over 50 Australian representatives, amongst a host of players who have represented other nations at the highest level.

== History ==
=== Early years ===
Established in 1972, the first Australian Schoolboys rugby league team featured players from New South Wales and one Western Australian player. The team did not include any Queensland players as they did not send players to the trials. The team was initially in the Under-16s division, unlike today. Coached by future Western Suburbs Magpies Team of the 20th Century coach, Roy Masters, and featuring future internationals Ian Schubert, Craig Young, Les Boyd, and Royce Ayliffe, the side toured Great Britain, going undefeated on the tour and scoring 108 tries in their 11 games to their opponents' 1. This was the last Schoolboys team until 1978.

In 1978, the first official Australian Schoolboys Championships were held, but NSW Combined Catholic Colleges did not attend. For the first time, Queensland-based high school players trialed, and the first of four 'merit teams' was selected; merit teams do not tour or play games together.

The Schoolboys returned to touring with the 1979 team, featuring future Australian internationals Ben Elias and Andrew Farrar. The team toured France and England and went undefeated.

=== 1980s ===
The first Schoolboys side of the 80's was selected in 1981, when the Schoolboys hosted the touring [Junior Kiwis] side from New Zealand. They played two games, with the Schoolboys winning both. It was the first time the Schoolboys hosted a tour and played a New Zealand side.

In 1982, the Schoolboys toured New Zealand for the first time, where they also received their first ever loss against an Auckland-based selection team, 16–10. The team was captained by future Australian international Paul Langmack and featured another future international in Andrew Ettingshausen. Another merit team was selected in 1983 and once again featured Ettingshausen. Future internationals Greg Alexander and Paul Sironen, and future first grade regulars, Tony Butterfield and Jeff Hardy, were also a part of the side.

In 1984, the Schoolboys hosted a tour by the British Upper Schools and Colleges (BUSCARLA), winning both matches. The 1984 Australian Schoolboys was also the first to feature a player who went on to represent a country other than Australia at international level. Theo Anast from Armidale High School later played six games for France between 1993 and 1994.

The team selected in 1985 went undefeated against a touring Junior Kiwis side and in 1986 went undefeated once again on their tour of England. The 1986 side featured future Australian internationals Bradley Clyde and Andrew Gee. In 1987, another merit side was selected, which featured Clyde for the second time.

In 1988, the side toured New Zealand and featured Tim Brasher, David Fairleigh and a 16-year-old Brad Fittler. The team went undefeated. Fittler was named again in 1989, as the Schoolboys hosted the British Amateur Rugby League under 19's (BARLA) for two games, winning both.

=== 1990s ===
The 1990 Schoolboys side was originally a merit team, but played a one-off game against the Australian Youth Development Squad, which they won 38–6. The 1991 team, once again, went undefeated on their tour of England.

In 1992, with a side featuring future premiership winner and Australian international Steve Menzies, the side toured New Zealand. On the tour, the Schoolboys lost their first ever Test match to a New Zealand side featuring future Kiwis Gene Ngamu, Joe Vagana and Ruben Wiki.

The 1993 Australian Schoolboys hosted BARLA and played two tests, winning both. Future NSW State of Origin player and world champion boxer Anthony Mundine was in the team.

In 1994, the Schoolboys hosted, and defeated, the touring Junior Kiwis. This marked the first appearance of a then-15-year-old Owen Craigie, who represented the Schoolboys a record three times in 1994, 1995, and 1996. Future Australian internationals Brett Kimmorley, Ben Ikin and Luke Priddis were also in the side.

The 1995 Schoolboys toured France and England and went undefeated. The side featured future Australian internationals Trent Barrett and Matthew Gidley and World Cup winning New Zealand captain Nathan Cayless. 1995 also saw the first ever Northern Territory schoolboy in Duncan MacGillivray. MacGillivary later represented Scotland at the 2008 Rugby League World Cup.

Due to the ARL and Super League war in 1996, the Schoolboys (who were supposed to tour New Zealand) toured Papua New Guinea for the first time. They went undefeated in their four matches. The team was coached by 1972 Australian Schoolboys representative Brian Hetherington. The team also featured Ben Rauter, whose father Herb also represented the Australian Schoolboys in 1972. Ben and Herb became the first father son pair to represent the Schoolboys.

The side went undefeated in their 1997 when they once again hosted BARLA, in a squad which featured future first graders and representative players Luke Bailey, Dane Carlaw and Luke Patten. In 1998, the Schoolboys toured New Zealand, playing 4 games and losing only one to an Auckland Invitational XIII. The team featured future Australian international Mark Gasnier, who played for the Schoolboys again the following year. The 1999 side toured France, England and Ireland, going undefeated. The squad featured future Australian internationals Justin Hodges, Jamie Lyon, Corey Parker and Brent Tate.

=== 2000s ===
The Schoolboys team hosted a touring New Zealand schools side in 2000, comfortably winning both games. In 2001, the Schoolboys hosted the touring England Academy side and French Schools team. The Schoolboys went undefeated in three games and featured future internationals Greg Bird and Michael Weyman (who represented again in 2002).

In 2002, on the Schoolboys tour of England and France, they lost two games for the first time on the same tour and lost a test series, when they were beaten by the England Academy side. The Schoolboys side featured a number of future Australian internationals including Weyman, Keith Galloway, Ben Hannant, Ryan Hoffman Tom Learoyd-Lahrs, future Fijian international Ashton Sims and future French international Dimitri Pelo.

The 2003 side, which featured current New Zealand captain Benji Marshall and future Australian international Karmichael Hunt, toured New Zealand winning two games and losing one. In 2004, the Schoolboys hosted the touring English and French teams. They defeated BARLA and a France Schools side but lost to the England Academy team. The 2004 side featured future international Greg Inglis.

The 2005 side played a two games test series against the Junior Kiwis in Australia, winning the first game and losing the second. The team featured future Australian international stars Michael Jennings, David Taylor, Darius Boyd and Akuila Uate. In 2006, the Schoolboys toured Wales, England and France and went undefeated for the first time since 2001. Future representative players Israel Folau, Mitchell Pearce and Chris Lawrence were on the tour.

The Schoolboys then went undefeated on their 2007 tour of New Zealand, in 2008 against the touring England Academy and French Schools sides and in 2009 against the touring Great Britain Community Lions. Over the three years the side featured future first grade players Martin Kennedy, Kieran Foran, Lachlan Coote, Andrew McCullough, William Hopoate, Jamal Idris, Aaron Woods, Jason Taumalolo, Cheyse Blair and Joseph Leilua, amongst a host of others.

=== 2010s ===
In 2010, the side toured England, Wales and France, winning 4 games and losing two (both to the England Academy). The squad featured future first graders Tautau Moga, Harry Siejka, and Jack Wighton.

In 2011, the Schoolboys toured New Zealand and played the Junior Kiwis twice, winning one game and losing one game. Richard Kennar, from Craigieburn Secondary College CAS, became the first Victorian player to play for the Australian Schoolboys.

The 2012 Schoolboys squad featured Mitchell Moses, the nephew of 1979 and 1981 schoolboy representative Ben Elias, and future first graders Dylan Walker and Kelepi Tanginoa. The team defeated the touring England Academy squad in both their encounters, 43–10 in Canberra and 42–14 in Brisbane.

The 2013 side toured New Zealand and featured Jackson Hastings, the son of Sydney Roosters player Kevin Hastings, and Sione Mata'utia, who went on to make his senior international debut for Australia a year later, becoming Australia's youngest ever representative.

The 2014 side was announced on 14 July, and toured France and England in November and December of that year. The side played 7 games, winning 6 of them. The side broke the record for biggest win by the Australian Schoolboys, defeating the Cumbria Combined Regional Academy 86–6.

In 2015, the Schoolboys hosted the touring New Zealand under-18 side, winning both games in the two-game series.

In 2018, the Schoolboys toured England. On the first match of the tour the Schoolboys set a new biggest win record beating the England Colleges team 92–0.

== Players ==
=== 2026 Australian Schoolboys ===
No.	Team	Player	School
1	NSWCHS	Liam Martin	Westfields Sports High School
2	NSWCIS	Cyrus Bloomfield	Oakhill College
3	NSWCHS	William Manning	Hunter Sports High School
4	NSWCHS	Callum Elsley	Kurri Kurri High School
5	NSWCCC	Cornelius Pupualii	Patrician Brothers' College, Blacktown
6	NSWCCC	Chase Butler	All Saints College, Maitland
7	NSWCHS	Liam Challenor	Endeavour Sports High School
8	NSWCCC	Steven Nunn	Patrician Brothers' College, Blacktown
9	QRSS	Jai Bilish	Palm Beach Currumbin State High School
10	NSWCHS	Jamie Curran	Endeavour Sports High School
11	NSWCHS	Curtis Mulherin	Hunter Sports High School
12	QRSS	Kalani Patu	Keebra Park State High School
13	NSWCCC	Charlie Xuereb	Patrician Brothers' College, Blacktown
14	QRSS	Jireh-Trey Stewart	Bass High School
15	NSWCHS	Cooper Townsend	Hunter Sports High School
16	NSWCCC	Cordell Arama	Patrician Brothers' College, Blacktown
17	NSWCHS	Hayden Bell	Westfields Sports High School
18	NSWCCC	Riley Rostron	All Saints College, Maitland

=== Team of the Century ===
On 19 September 2008, as a part of rugby league centenary celebrations, Australian Rugby League CEO Geoff Carr and ARL president Bruce Wallace announced the Australian Schoolboys Team of the Century.

No.	Team	Player	School	Years
1	NSWCHS	Tim Brasher	Grantham High School	1988
2	NSWCCC	Andrew Ettingshausen	De La Salle College, Cronulla	1982–83
3	NSWCHS	Mark Gasnier	Peakhurst High School	1998–99
4	QRSS	Justin Hodges	Cairns State High School	1998–99
5	QRSS	Greg Inglis	Wavell State High School	2004
6	NSWCCC	Brad Fittler	McCarthy Senior High School	1988–89
7	NSWCCC	Greg Alexander	Patrician Brothers' College, Fairfield	1983
8	NSWCHS	Craig Young	Corrimal High School	1972
9	NSWCCC	Danny Buderus	St Francis Xavier's College, Hamilton	1995
10	NSWCHS	Les Boyd	Nyngan High School	1972
11	NSWCHS	Steve Menzies	Narrabeen Sports High School	1992
12	NSWCCC	Paul Sironen	Holy Cross College, Ryde	1983
13	ACT	Bradley Clyde	Hawker College	1986–87
14	QSRS	Tonie Carroll	Beenleigh State High School	1993
15	NSWCHS	Ian Schubert	Wauchope High School	1972
16	NSWCHS	Matthew Gidley	Glendale Technology High School	1995
17	QRSS	Brent Tate	Clontarf Beach State High School	1999

=== Captains ===
- Royce Ayliffe (1972–1973)
- Stephen Hardy (1979–1980)
- Brett Gale (1981)
- Paul Langmack (1982)
- Jason Alchin (1984)
- David Rowles (1985)
- Mark Soden (1986)
- Brett Horsnell (1988)
- Jason Croker (1989)
- Russell Hill (1990)
- Michael Buettner (1991)
- Garen Casey (1992)
- Ben Walker (1993)
- Jason Ferris (1994)
- Ronald Davis (1995)
- Nathan Cayless (1996)
- Owen Craigie (1996)
- Ben Galea (1996)
- Ted Simpson (1996)
- Mark McLinden (1997)
- Luke Branighan (1999)
- John Rowbotham (1999)
- Kai Holland (2000)
- Michael Russo (2001)
- Michael Weyman (2002)
- Unknown (2004)
- Blake Green (2005)
- Mitchell Pearce (2006)
- Martin Kennedy (2007)
- Tim Auremi (2008)
- Cameron King (2009)
- Paul Carter (2010)
- Brenden Santi (2011)
- Adam Elliott (2012)
- Sione Mata'utia (2013)
- Ashleigh Nisbet (2014)
- Nathan Cleary (2015)
- Blayke Brailey (2016)
- Campbell Graham (2017)
- Zac Lomax (2017)
- Jock Madden (2018)
- Jackson Topine (2019)
- Harrison Hassett (2022)
- Lachlan Galvin (2023)
- Jacob Halangahu (2024)
- Thomas Dellow (2025)

=== International representatives ===
Australia

- (Australia) Jamie Ainscough
- (Australia) Greg Alexander
- (Australia) Braith Anasta
- (Australia) Royce Ayliffe
- (Australia) Luke Bailey
- (Australia) Trent Barrett
- (Australia) Greg Bird
- (Australia) Darius Boyd
- (Australia) Les Boyd
- (Australia) Tim Brasher
- (Australia) Danny Buderus
- (Australia) Michael Buettner
- (Australia) Dane Carlaw
- (Australia) Tonie Carroll
- (Australia) Nathan Cleary
- (Australia) Bradley Clyde
- (Australia) Nick Cotric
- (Australia) Reuben Cotter
- (Australia) Jason Croker
- (Australia) Ben Elias
- (Australia) Andrew Ettingshausen
- (Australia) David Fairleigh
- (Australia) Andrew Farrar
- (Australia) Brad Fittler
- (Australia) Israel Folau
- (Australia) Jake Friend

- (Australia) Keith Galloway
- (Australia) Mark Gasnier
- (Australia) Matthew Gidley
- (Australia) Campbell Graham
- (Australia) Payne Haas
- (Australia) Ben Hannant
- (Australia) Justin Hodges
- (Australia) Ryan Hoffman
- (Australia) Mark Hohn
- (Australia) Rodney Howe
- (Australia) Ben Hunt
- (Australia) Karmichael Hunt
- (Australia) Jamal Idris
- (Australia) Ben Ikin
- (Australia) Greg Inglis
- (Australia) Michael Jennings
- (Australia) Alex Johnston
- (Australia) Brett Kimmorley
- (Australia) Brent Kite
- (Australia) David Klemmer
- (Australia) Paul Langmack
- (Australia) Chris Lawrence
- (Australia) Tom Learoyd-Lahrs
- (Australia) Jamie Lyon

- (Australia) Sione Mata'utia
- (Australia) Steve Menzies
- (Australia) Brad Meyers
- (Australia) Latrell Mitchell
- (Australia) Joel Monaghan
- (Australia) Michael Morgan
- (Australia) Cameron Murray
- (Australia) Corey Parker
- (Australia) Luke Priddis
- (Australia) Russell Richardson
- (Australia) Robbie Ross
- (Australia) Ian Schubert
- (Australia) Paul Sironen
- (Australia) Kade Snowden
- (Australia) Hamiso Tabuai-Fidow
- (Australia) Brent Tate
- (Australia) David Taylor
- (Australia) James Tedesco
- (Australia) Jake Trbojevic
- (Australia) Akuila Uate
- (Australia) Dylan Walker
- (Australia) Michael Weyman
- (Australia) Aaron Woods
- (Australia) Craig Young

Chile
- (Chile) Daniel Vasquez

Cook Islands

- (Cook Islands) Troy Dargan
- (Cook Islands) Martin Mitchell
- (Cook Islands) Ngaromoana Rio
- (Cook Islands) Brendan Piakura

Fiji

- (Fiji) Tevita Cottrell
- (Fiji) Lamar Liolevave
- (Fiji) Junior Roqica
- (Fiji) Ashton Sims
- (Fiji) Akuila Uate

France

- (France) Theo Anast
- (France) Jason Baitieri
- (France) Trent Clayton
- (France) Dimitri Pelo

Great Britain

- (United Kingdom) Jackson Hastings

Greece

- (Greece) Braith Anasta
- (Greece) Michael Korkidas
- (Greece) Nick Kouparitsas

Hungary

- (Hungary) Matiu Fukofuka

Ireland

- (Republic of Ireland) Ian Herron
- (Republic of Ireland) Jamie Mathiou
- (Republic of Ireland) Danny Williams
- (Republic of Ireland) Michael Withers

Italy

- (Italy) Paul Dal Santo
- (Italy) Mark Minichiello
- (Italy) Ray Nasso
- (Italy) Christian Orsini
- (Italy) Michael Russo
- (Italy) Brenden Santi
- (Italy) Kade Snowden
- (Italy) James Tedesco

Lebanon

- (Lebanon) Jalal Bazzaz
- (Lebanon) Tim Mannah
- (Lebanon) Mitchell Moses
- (Lebanon) Jaxson Rahme
- (Lebanon) James Roumanos

Malta

- (Malta) Luke Branighan
- (Malta) Jesse Cronin

New Zealand

- (New Zealand) Tonie Carroll
- (New Zealand) Nathan Cayless
- (New Zealand) Kieran Foran
- (New Zealand) Benji Marshall
- (New Zealand) Sam Perrett
- (New Zealand) Kevin Proctor
- (New Zealand) Tony Puletua
- (New Zealand) Ben Roberts
- (New Zealand) Jason Taumalolo
- (New Zealand) Martin Taupau

Niue

- (Niue) Albert Talipeau

Papua New Guinea

- (Papua New Guinea) Jay Aston
- (Papua New Guinea) Kurt Baptiste
- (Papua New Guinea) Alex Johnston
- (Papua New Guinea) Nene Macdonald
- (Papua New Guinea) Mark Mom
- (Papua New Guinea) Lachlan Lam

Poland

- (Poland) Harry Siejka

Portugal

- (Portugal) Blake Austin

Samoa

- (Samoa) Michael Chee-Kam
- (Samoa) Stephen Crichton
- (Samoa) Mat Feagai
- (Samoa) Royce Hunt
- (Samoa) Brian Leauma
- (Samoa) Joseph Leilua
- (Samoa) Luciano Leilua
- (Samoa) Spencer Leniu
- (Samoa) Pat Mata'utia
- (Samoa) Peter Mata'utia
- (Samoa) Sione Mata'utia
- (Samoa) Steve Meredith
- (Samoa) Tautau Moga

- (Samoa) Peewee Moke
- (Samoa) Junior Moors
- (Samoa) David Nofoaluma
- (Samoa) Joseph Paulo
- (Samoa) Junior Paulo
- (Samoa) Eddy Pettybourne
- (Samoa) Frank Puletua
- (Samoa) Tony Puletua
- (Samoa) Ben Roberts
- (Samoa) Marion Seve
- (Samoa) Hamiso Tabuai-Fidow
- (Samoa) Tommy Talau
- (Samoa) Albert Talipeau
- (Samoa) McConkie Tauasa
- (Samoa) Martin Taupau
- (Samoa) Frank Winterstein
- (Samoa) Matthew Wright

Scotland

- (Scotland) Lachlan Coote
- (Scotland) Daniel Heckenberg
- (Scotland) Duncan MacGillivray

Tonga

- (Tonga) Ronnie Alovili
- (Tonga) David Fifita
- (Tonga) David Hala
- (Tonga) Solomon Haumono
- (Tonga) William Hopoate
- (Tonga) Phillip Howlett
- (Tonga) George Jennings
- (Tonga) Michael Jennings
- (Tonga) Isaiya Katoa
- (Tonga) Brent Kite
- (Tonga) Samisoni Langi
- (Tonga) Willie Mataka
- (Tonga) Feleti Mateo
- (Tonga) Tesi Niu
- (Tonga) Hame Sele
- (Tonga) Jason Taumalolo

United States

- (United States) Joseph Paulo
- (United States) Junior Paulo
- (United States) Eddy Pettybourne

=== State of Origin representatives ===
New South Wales

- (New South Wales) Jamie Ainscough
- (New South Wales) Greg Alexander
- (New South Wales) Braith Anasta
- (New South Wales) Royce Ayliffe
- (New South Wales) Luke Bailey
- (New South Wales) Trent Barrett
- (New South Wales) Bradman Best
- (New South Wales) Greg Bird
- (New South Wales) Phil Blake
- (New South Wales) Les Boyd
- (New South Wales) Tim Brasher
- (New South Wales) David Brooks
- (New South Wales) Danny Buderus
- (New South Wales) Michael Buettner
- (New South Wales) Tony Butterfield
- (New South Wales) Steve Carter
- (New South Wales) Nick Cotric
- (New South Wales) Stephen Crichton
- (New South Wales) Nathan Cleary
- (New South Wales) Bradley Clyde
- (New South Wales) Jason Croker
- (New South Wales) Ben Elias
- (New South Wales) Andrew Ettingshausen
- (New South Wales) David Fairleigh
- (New South Wales) Andrew Farrar
- (New South Wales) Brett Finch
- (New South Wales) Brad Fittler
- (New South Wales) Keith Galloway
- (New South Wales) Mark Gasnier
- (New South Wales) Matthew Gidley
- (New South Wales) Payne Haas
- (New South Wales) Brian Hetherington
- (New South Wales) Ryan Hoffman
- (New South Wales) William Hopoate
- (New South Wales) Rodney Howe
- (New South Wales) Neil Hunt
- (New South Wales) Jamal Idris
- (New South Wales) Michael Jennings
- (New South Wales) Brett Kimmorley
- (New South Wales) Brent Kite
- (New South Wales) David Klemmer
- (New South Wales) Paul Langmack
- (New South Wales) Tom Learoyd-Lahrs
- (New South Wales) Spencer Leniu
- (New South Wales) Zac Lomax
- (New South Wales) Jamie Lyon
- (New South Wales) Tim Mannah
- (New South Wales) Steve Menzies
- (New South Wales) Latrell Mitchell
- (New South Wales) Joel Monaghan
- (New South Wales) Jarrod Mullen
- (New South Wales) Anthony Mundine
- (New South Wales) Ken Nagas
- (New South Wales) Mitchell Pearce
- (New South Wales) Justin Poore
- (New South Wales) Luke Priddis
- (New South Wales) Anthony Quinn
- (New South Wales) Tony Rampling
- (New South Wales) Reece Robson
- (New South Wales) Robbie Ross
- (New South Wales) Matt Seers
- (New South Wales) Paul Sironen
- (New South Wales) Kade Snowden
- (New South Wales) Jason Taylor
- (New South Wales) James Tedesco
- (New South Wales) Jake Trbojevic
- (New South Wales) Akuila Uate
- (New South Wales) Ricky Walford
- (New South Wales) Dylan Walker
- (New South Wales) Michael Weyman
- (New South Wales) Aaron Woods
- (New South Wales) Craig Young

Queensland

- (Queensland) Jai Arrow
- (Queensland) Darius Boyd
- (Queensland) Alan Cann
- (Queensland) Dane Carlaw
- (Queensland) Tonie Carroll
- (Queensland) Reuben Cotter
- (Queensland) Tom Dearden
- (Queensland) Israel Folau
- (Queensland) David Fifita (rugby league, born 2000)
- (Queensland) Andrew Gee
- (Queensland) Ben Hannant
- (Queensland) Ashley Harrison
- (Queensland) Tony Hearn
- (Queensland) Justin Hodges
- (Queensland) Mark Hohn
- (Queensland) Ben Hunt
- (Queensland) Karmichael Hunt
- (Queensland) Ben Ikin
- (Queensland) Greg Inglis
- (Queensland) Jacob Lillyman
- (Queensland) Andrew McCullough
- (Queensland) Casey McGuire
- (Queensland) Brad Meyers
- (Queensland) Michael Morgan
- (Queensland) Clinton O'Brien
- (Queensland) Julian O'Neill
- (Queensland) Corey Parker
- (Queensland) Hamiso Tabuai-Fidow
- (Queensland) Brent Tate
- (Queensland) David Taylor
- (Queensland) Craig Teevan
- (Queensland) Chris Walker
- (Queensland) Reece Walsh
- (Queensland) Rhys Wesser

== Coaches ==
The current coach of the Australian Schoolboys team is Tim White, first grade coach at Holy Cross College, Ryde and NSW Combined Catholic Colleges (NSWCCC) Rugby League Convenor.

- Roy Masters 1972–1973
- Ray Montgomery 1979–1980
- Ray Pendrigh 1981
- Bob McGuiness 1982
- David Waite 1984, 1986
- Geoff Snowden 1985
- Arthur Sauverain 1988–1989
- Bob Cullen 1990
- Peter Sollis 1991–1992
- Bruce Wallace 1993–1995
- Brian Hetherington 1996–1997
- Mark Greer 1998–1999
- Michael McEntyre 2000–2002
- Rod Patison 2003–2004
- Simon Huntly 2005–2007
- Brendan Barlow 2008–2010
- Peter Denham 2011–2014
- Brian Battese 2015-2016
- Tony Adam 2017–2019
- Tim White 2021–2024
- Adam Sargent Wilson 2025–present

== See also ==
- Junior Kangaroos
- List of Australia Schoolboy rugby league team players
- Australian Schoolboys rugby union team
