= Gary Burns =

Gary Burns may refer to:

- Gary Burns (director) (born 1960), Canadian film writer and director
- Gary Burns (ice hockey) (born 1955), former American ice hockey forward
- Gary Burns, former commissioner of South Australia Police
- Garry Burns, Australian activist and litigant
