= Peewee Moke =

Former Samoa international rugby league footballer

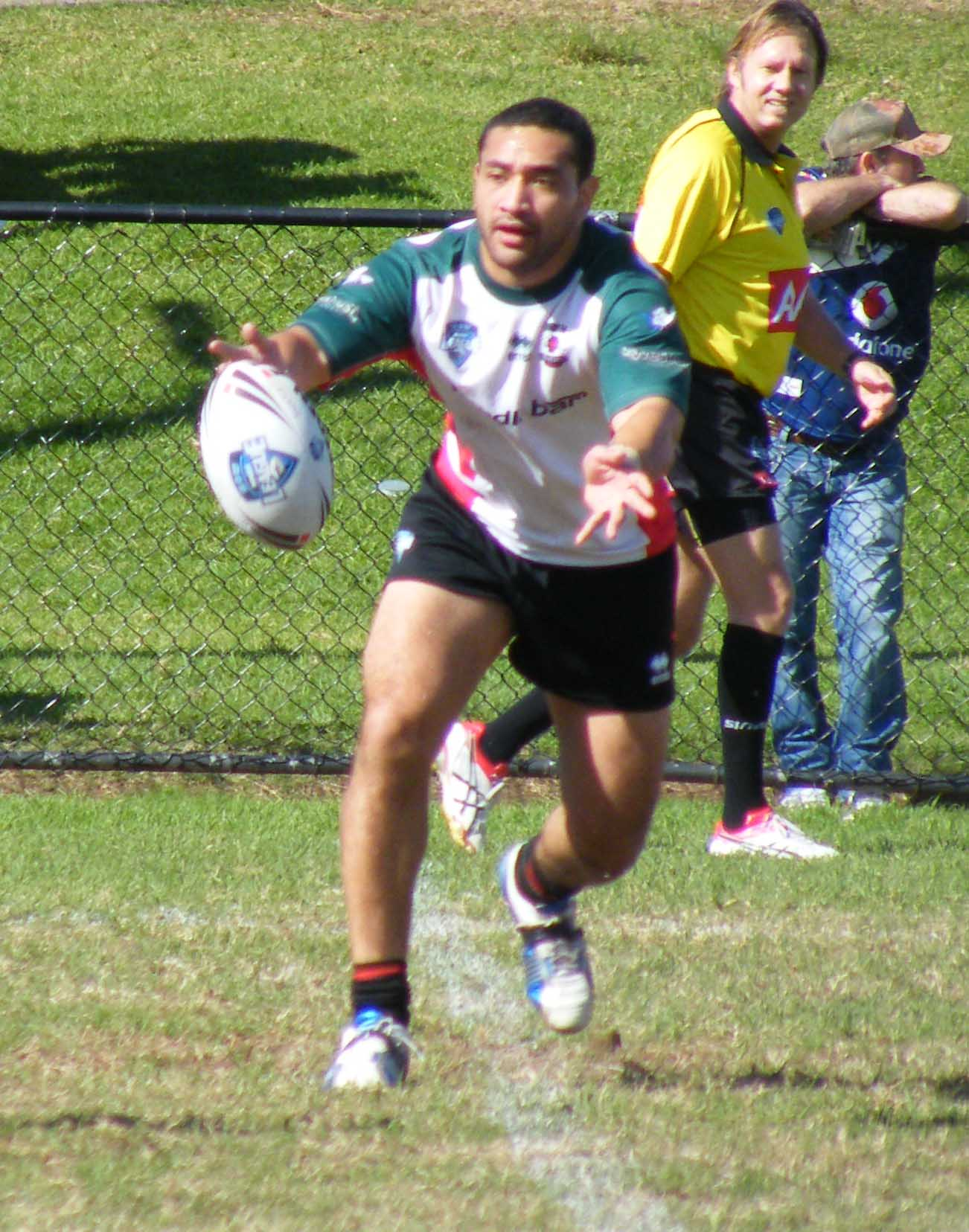

Personal information
- Full name: Peewee Keema Moke
- Born: January 12, 1986 (age 40) Apia, Samoa
- Height: 183 cm (6 ft 0 in)
- Weight: 98 kg (15 st 6 lb)

Playing information
- Position: Centre, Lock
Representative
Years	Team	Pld	T	G	FG	P
2006	Samoa	5	2	0	0	4
- Source: As of 9 February 2021 (UTC)

Peewee Moke (born January 12, 1986, in Samoa) is a Samoan rugby league footballer who plays as a centre.

== Early years ==
Moke attended Endeavour Sports High School, and his junior club was the Enfield Federals.

== Playing career ==
Moke has been with the Penrith Panthers, Cronulla Sharks, Canterbury Bulldogs and Sydney Roosters though he never represented any club at first grade level. He later played for the Temora Dragons.

After his rugby league career petered out, he began playing golf.

== International career ==
While attending Endeavour Sports High School, Moke played for the Australian Schoolboys team in 2005. In 2006 he played for Samoa as they attempted to qualify for the 2008 World Cup.
