= Stacey McManus =

Australian softball player (born 1989)

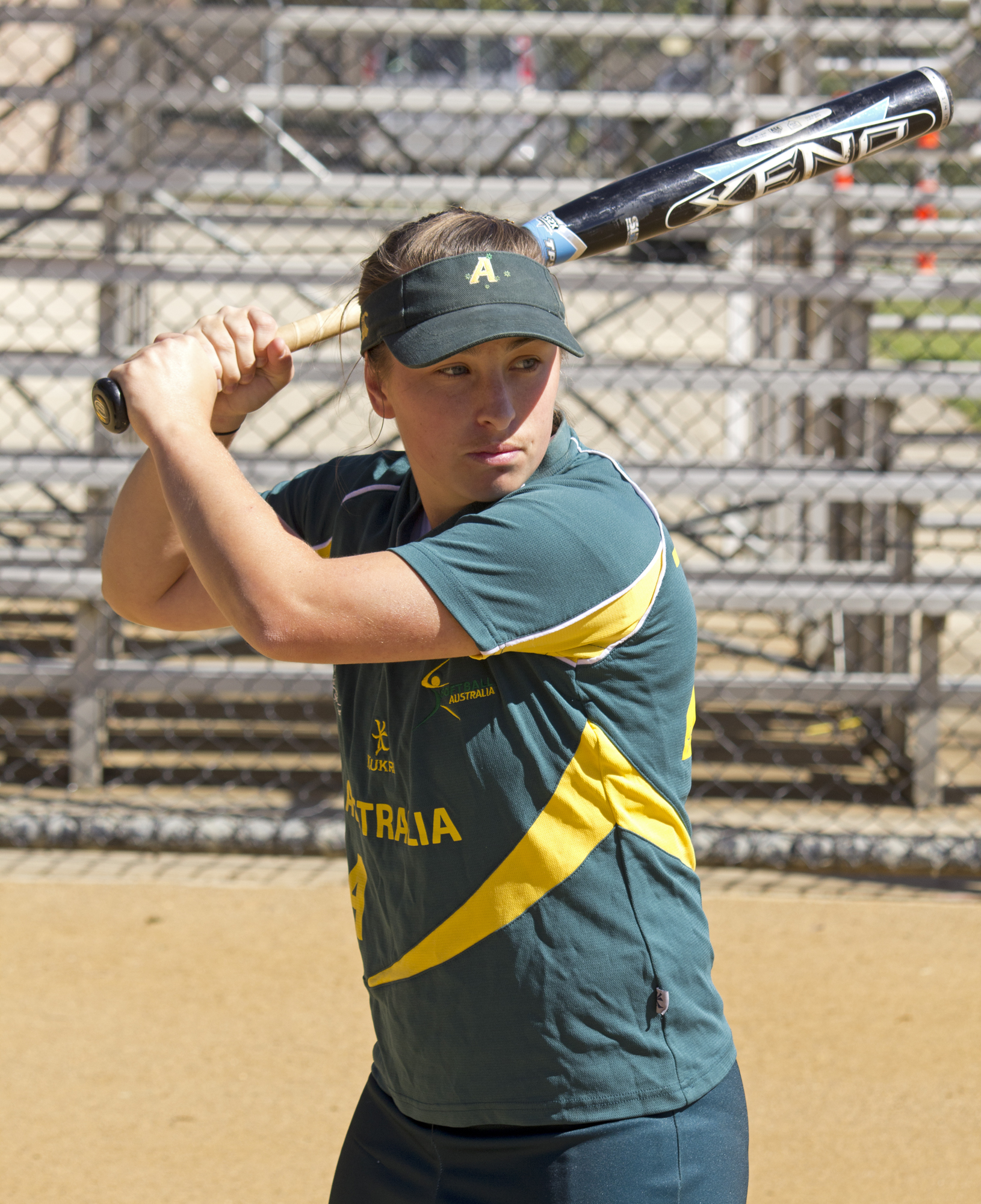
- McManus in March 2012 during a photoshoot

Personal information
- Nationality: Australian
- Born: April 12, 1989 (age 35); Sydney

Sport
- Country: Australia
- Sport: Softball
- Event: Women's team

Stacey McManus (born 12 April 1989 in Sydney) is an Australian softball player. She is a shortstop and second baseman, plays club softball and has represented New South Wales in national competitions. She is a member of Australia women's national softball team and competed at the Canadian Open Fastpitch International Series and the World Cup of Softball. She is trying to earn a spot on the team that will compete at the 2012 ISF XIII Women's World Championships.

== Personal ==
Stacey McManus was born in April 1989 in Sydney, New South Wales. Both of her parents and uncle played softball. She has 2 sisters Kristen and Brooke that both play. Brooke McManus, plays for New Zealand women's national softball team. In 2011, her sister was playing for the New South Wales team. She attended Endeavour Sports High School.

== Softball ==
McManus plays shortstop and second base. She started playing softball when she was four years old. In 2004, she was named to the New South Wales U16 team. In 2005, she represented Endeavour Sports High School in the NSW CHS girls baseball knockout final. While she hit a home run, her team lost 7-2 and finished second in the competition. She made her first New South Wales open representative team when she was sixteen years old. In 2006, she played for the New South Wales side that won the Australian All Schools Softball Championship. In 2009, she has a scholarship with and played for the Australian Institute of Sport team.

=== National team ===
McManus is a member of Australia's women national softball team. In March 2009, she participated in a Brisbane-based training camp. In July 2011, she accompanied the team on a tour of North America, the only national team player from her part of New South Wales selected for the team. During the tour, she represented Australia at the Canadian Open Fastpitch International Series and the World Cup of Softball. In January 2012, she played against her sister and New Zealand in a three-game test series that Australia won every game of. She is a member of the 2012 Australia women's national softball team and is trying to earn a spot on the team that will compete at the 2012 ISF XIII Women's World Championships.

McManus was selected for the Australian women's national softball team at the 2020 Summer Olympics. The team came away with one win out of five, beating Italy 1-0 in their second match of the Round Robin and finished fifth overall. Full details are in Australia at the 2020 Summer Olympics.

== Recognition ==
In January 2012, McManus and her sister were named 2012 monthly Leader-Tynan Honda Sportstar of the Year.
