= Andrew Dallalana =

Italy international rugby league footballer

Personal information
- Born: 31 August 1982 (age 42); Sydney, New South Wales, Australia

Playing information
- Position: Halfback
Club
Years	Team	Pld	T	G	FG	P
2003	Cronulla	5	0	0	0	0
2006–07	Villefranche XIII
	Total	5	0	0	0	0
Representative
Years	Team	Pld	T	G	FG	P
2004	Italy	1	0	0	0	16

Andrew Dallalana (born 31 August 1982) is a former Italy international rugby league footballer who played for the Cronulla-Sutherland Sharks in the NRL.

Dallalana attended Endeavour Sports High School and played junior football for Cronulla-Caringbah.

In the 2003 NRL season he made five first-grade appearances as a halfback for Cronulla, as an injury replacement for Brett Kimmorley.
