= Israel Folau =

Australian multi-code footballer

Personal information
- Full name: ʻIsileli Folau
- Born: 3 April 1989 (age 37) Minto, New South Wales, Australia

Playing information
- Height: 193 cm (6 ft 4 in)
- Weight: 103 kg (16 st 3 lb)

Rugby league
- Position: Centre, Wing
Club
Years	Team	Pld	T	G	FG	P
2007–08	Melbourne Storm	52	36	5	0	154
2009–10	Brisbane Broncos	39	37	0	0	148
2020	Catalans Dragons	15	5	0	0	20
	Total	106	78	5	0	322
Representative
Years	Team	Pld	T	G	FG	P
2010	NRL All Stars	1	0	0	0	0
2008–10	Queensland	5	5	0	0	20
2007–09	Australia	8	6	0	0	24

Rugby union
- Position: Fullback, Wing, Centre
Club
Years	Team	Pld	T	G	FG	P
2013–19	New South Wales Waratahs	96	60	0	0	300
2021–26	Urayasu D-Rocks (Note: When Folau joined the team, they had the name Shining Arcs Tokyo-Bay Urayasu.)	38	27	0	0	135
	Total	134	87	0	0	435
Representative
Years	Team	Pld	T	G	FG	P
2013–19	Australia	73	37	0	0	185
2022–23	Tonga	2	0	0	0	0

Australian rules football
- Position: Utility
Club
Years	Team	Pld	G
2011–12	Greater Western Sydney	13	2
- Relatives: John Folau (brother)

Israel 'Isileli Folau (Tongan: [fo'lɑʊ̯]; born 3 April 1989) is a former professional rugby union player, a former Australian rules football and former professional rugby league footballer. He last played as a fullback for Japan Rugby League One club Urayasu D-Rocks. Born in Australia, he played rugby league for Australia, and rugby union for Australia and Tonga after qualifying on ancestry grounds.

Folau began his professional career playing rugby league for the Melbourne Storm in the National Rugby League (NRL) from 2007 to 2008, where he broke the record for most tries in a debut year. He then played with the Brisbane Broncos from 2009 to 2010. Playing as a wing or centre, Folau represented Queensland in the State of Origin and Australia, becoming the youngest player to play for both teams. In 2020, Folau played for the French rugby league team the Catalans Dragons in the Super League.

In 2011, Folau joined the Greater Western Sydney Giants in the Australian Football League (AFL) and played for two seasons. In December 2012, Folau switched codes again, this time to rugby union, and signed a one-year contract with the Waratahs. He became the record holder for the most tries scored in Super Rugby history post the 2019 season. At international level, he made his debut for Australia in 2013 against the British & Irish Lions, and went on to earn 73 caps. In 2022, Folau switched allegiance in order to represent Tonga after World Rugby changed its eligibility rules.

Folau's statements about homosexuality brought him into conflict with the administrators of Rugby Australia, and in 2019 they terminated his contract. Alleging that Rugby Australia terminated his employment on the basis of religion, Folau commenced proceedings in the Fair Work Commission but was unable to reach a settlement with Rugby Australia. He subsequently commenced proceedings in the Federal Circuit Court of Australia and a confidential settlement between the two parties was announced on 4 December 2019.

== Early life ==
Folau was born in Minto, New South Wales, to Tongan parents, Eni and Amelia. He attended Lurnea Public School and Westfields Sports High School before his family moved to Brisbane, Queensland, in 2004, after his father obtained work there. In Brisbane, Folau attended Marsden State High School from where he was selected for the Queensland Schoolboys squad in the Australian Under-15 Championships and also represented the Australian Schoolboys team in 2006. Folau also played several seasons of junior rugby league at the Goodna Eagles in Goodna.

At the Australian championships, Folau was spotted by a Melbourne Storm scout and was invited to play his junior football with the Storm's feeder club at the time, Queensland Cup team, the Norths Devils. He won a premiership while playing with Norths and became the first player to represent Queensland Under-19's while still only 16 years old. From playing with the Queensland Schoolboys and the Devils, in 2006, while in year 12 at Marsden State High School where his classmates were Chris Sandow and Antonio Winterstein, Folau was selected to play in the Australian Schoolboys squad that toured Wales, England and France. Folau was strong, representing Australia and at the end of the tour was awarded the Australian Secondary School Rugby Leagues (ASSRL) Award for the best back of the tournament. Playing years above his age gave Melbourne the confidence to give Folau an opportunity in the NRL.

== Rugby league career ==
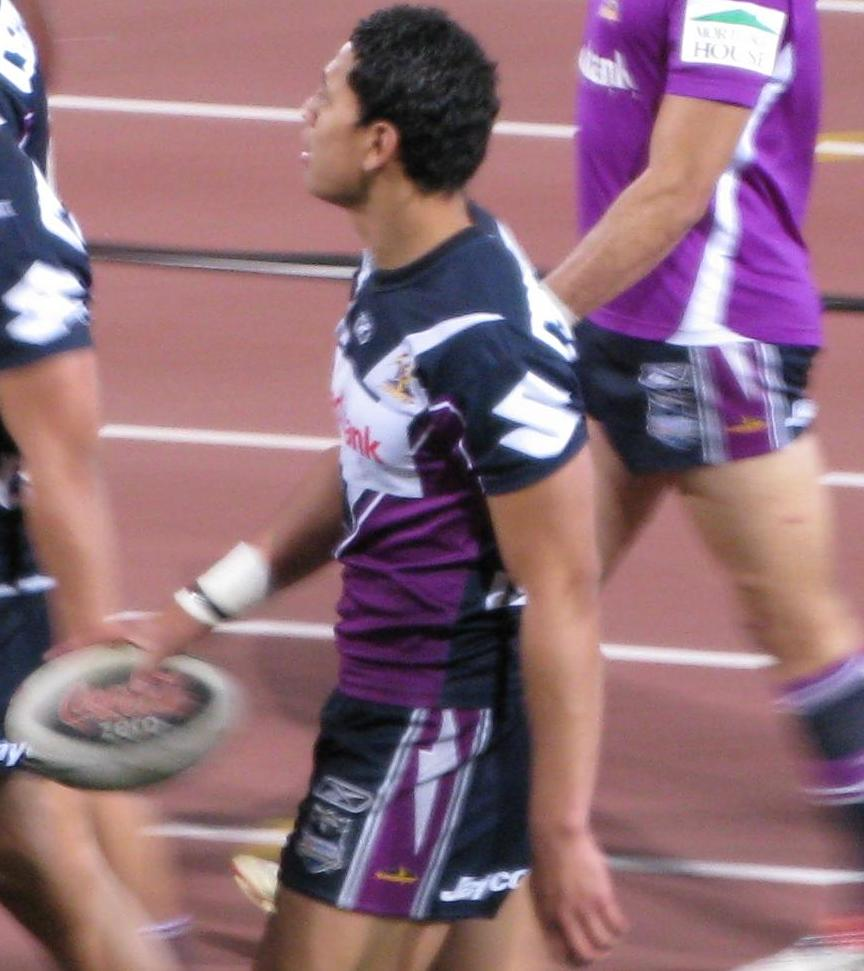
Israel Folau leaving the field following the pre-match warm-up, 15 August 2008

=== Melbourne Storm ===
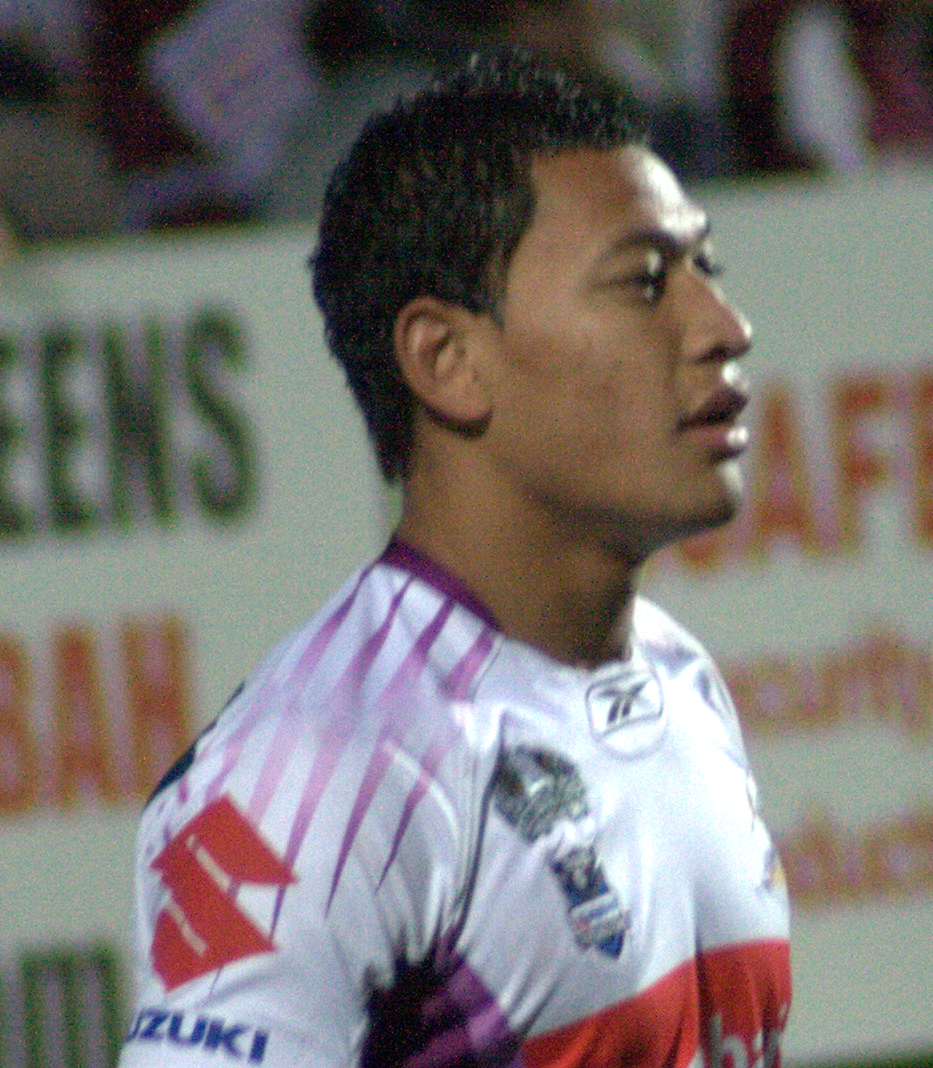
Israel Folau in 2008

==== 2007 ====
Folau was just 17 years of age when he made his debut in the 2007 NRL season. His debut came earlier than his coach Craig Bellamy intended, and he was named as a replacement on the right wing for injured Steve Turner. He started in the side's first match of the 2007 NRL season, against the Wests Tigers, and became the youngest player ever to play for the Storm. In his first game, he scored the match-winning try to help Melbourne beat the Tigers 18–16. After such a solid performance in his opening game, and an injury-free year, Folau went on to play in every match of the season, the only player to do so for Melbourne in 2007. Playing superbly on the wing, coach Craig Bellamy brought Folau in to play in the centres from time to time, where he would receive more ball and have more opportunity to score points. After 26 rounds Folau finished the regular season with 21 tries and 5 goals for a total of 94 career points. His try tally (21) saw him the equal top-try scorer for the 2007 regular season alongside North Queensland Cowboys full-back Matt Bowen.

In his rookie year Folau broke a number of club and NRL records, the most prestigious being teammate Billy Slater's previous NRL record of most tries in a debut season (Slater scored 19 in 2003). Folau capped off a magnificent first season in the NRL by winning the 2007 Dally M Rookie of the Year Award and being a part of the successful 2007 Melbourne Storm premiership side, that only lost three matches all year. This premiership was later taken away due to mass salary cap breaches.

Following an ankle injury to Brisbane Broncos centre Justin Hodges, Folau replaced him in the Australian test side to play New Zealand on 14 October 2007. On his international debut, Folau became the youngest ever player to represent Australia at 18 years and 194 days old, passing the previous record set by Brad Fittler (18 years and 247 days) in 1990. Folau then went on to score two tries in Australia's record-breaking 58–0 victory over New Zealand.

==== 2008 ====
In 2008, after Melbourne and New South Wales representative Matt King announced he would be leaving the Storm to play with the Warrington Wolves in the Super League, Folau filled the void as the starting centre for Melbourne. After seven rounds of the 2008 season, Folau was named on the wing in the starting squad to represent Australia for the second time in the Centenary Australia vs. New Zealand test, contributing a try in the 28–12 win for the Kangaroos. Folau was then selected in the starting squad as a winger in the Queensland State of Origin Team for game I of the 2008 Series. On 21 May 2008, Folau made his debut for Queensland at ANZ Stadium Sydney. In the final minutes of the match, Folau scored a try on debut, but Queensland lost 18–10 to New South Wales. Folau retained his position for game II at Suncorp Stadium in Brisbane. Folau contributed one of the Maroons' four tries in the 30-point win over the Blues, levelling the series. In the final game of the series, game III, Folau scored two leaping tries and was awarded the Man of the Match in Queensland's 16–10 win over NSW.

At the conclusion of the 2008 regular season, Folau was again honoured at the prestigious Dally M Awards night, winning the Dally M Centre of the Year award. Folau had been a part of his second minor premiership in as many years with the Melbourne Storm and played in his second consecutive grand final where they lost in a rematch of last years final to the Manly-Warringah Sea Eagles. Earlier in the year away from the field, on 30 March 2008, it was announced Folau had signed with the Brisbane Broncos for the 2009 NRL season. Folau's decision to leave the Melbourne Storm at the end of 2008 was influenced by his desire to live closer to his family in Brisbane, Queensland.

In October 2008, Folau was chosen to play for the Kangaroos in the 2008 Rugby League World Cup. Folau scored two tries in Australia's successful opening match against New Zealand but would not score another try all through the series despite starting in Australia's 52 – 4 win over England and 52 – 0 win over Fiji. On 22 November he took part in his first World Cup Grand Final starting in the centres for Australia. Unfortunately for Folau he would not add a World Cup victory to his accolades as Australia lost 34 – 20 to under-dogs New Zealand.

Folau received the Rugby League International Federation 2008 Rookie of the Year award.

=== Brisbane Broncos ===
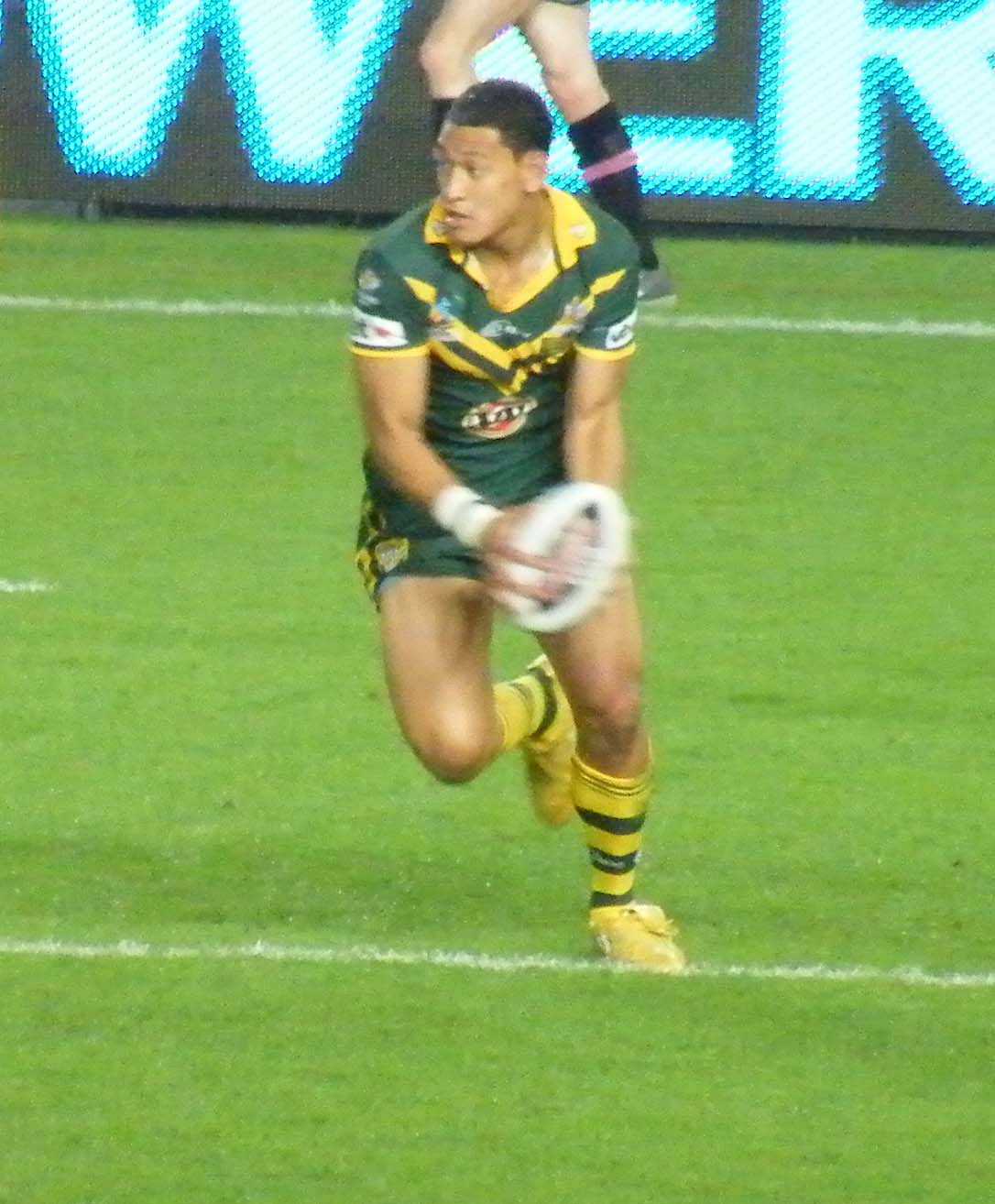
Israel Folau playing for Australia in 2008

Folau was a major signing for the Broncos at the same time several key players, as well as coach Wayne Bennett left the club.

==== 2009 ====
Folau made his debut for the Brisbane Broncos in round one of the 2009 season, scoring the team's first try in a 19–18 win over the North Queensland Cowboys. The following week, Folau again opened the scoring in the highly anticipated clash against his former club, Melbourne Storm, soaring above his former teammates to take a catch in what would be the first try in the Broncos 16–14 win – the club's first home win over the Storm since 2005. Folau continued his try-scoring feats averaging a try-a-game by Round 10. This was helped by a massive four-try haul against the Gold Coast Titans in May, equalling Brisbane Broncos Steve Renouf's record for the most tries in a single game for the Queensland club.

He was selected for Australia in the one-off test match against New Zealand on 8 May 2009.

In April 2009, he was named in the preliminary 25-man squad to represent Queensland in the opening match of the 2009 State of Origin series, and was subsequently picked on the wing for the opening State of Origin match. He also played in Game 2, scoring a try, but missed Game 3 due to injury.

==== 2010 ====
Controversially despite signing mid-year with rival code the AFL, Folau was selected and played in all three Origin games in 2010. He continued to produce try-scoring form scoring 17 tries from 16 matches with the Brisbane Broncos but his rugby league career to date was cut shorter than anticipated as the Brisbane Broncos failed to make the finals series for the first time in over a decade. Folau was also overlooked to represent Australia in the Four Nations tournament and was subsequently dis-allowed by the Australian Rugby League to play for Tonga in a warm-up match against Samoa. In a further somewhat controversial decision he was banned from being a member of the coaching staff as he had planned to run the water as a trainer for the Tongan team.

Folau training with the Catalans Dragons in February 2020

=== Catalans Dragons ===
In January 2020, Folau signed a one-year deal to play league for the Catalans Dragons. After playing just fifteen games for the Dragons, and scoring five tries, Folau was released.

Following his release, Folau was set to join the Southport Tigers in the Gold Coast Rugby League in a small stint before playing rugby union in the Japan Rugby League One, however was disallowed from being registered just three days before playing by the Queensland Rugby League (QRL).

=== Rugby league statistics ===
- denotes National Rugby League (NRL) season champions.
- denotes played in seasons NRL finals series.
- denotes played in seasons Super League finals series.

Team	Comp.	Season	Matches					Disc.		Goals		Tries	Points	Try ratio
Team	Comp.	Season	P	W	D	L	%	SB	SO	G	FG	Tries	Points	Try ratio
Melbourne Storm	NRL	2007	27	24	0	3	89	—N/a		5	0	21	94	0.778
Melbourne Storm	NRL	2008	25	19	0	6	77	—N/a		—N/a		15	60	0.600
Brisbane Broncos	NRL	2009	19	13	0	6	68	—N/a		—N/a		17	68	0.894
Brisbane Broncos	NRL	2010	20	10	0	10	50	—N/a		—N/a		20	80	1.000
NRL Total			91	66	0	25	73	—N/a		5	0	73	302	0.802
Catalans Dragons	Super League	2020	15	9	0	6	60	—N/a		—N/a		5	20	0.333
Total			106	75	0	31	71	—N/a		5	0	78	322	0.736
Team	Comp.	Season	P	W	D	L	%	SB	SO	G	FG	Tries	Points	Try ratio
Team	Comp.	Season	Matches					Disc.		Goals		Tries	Points	Try ratio

== Australian rules football career ==
Israel Folau
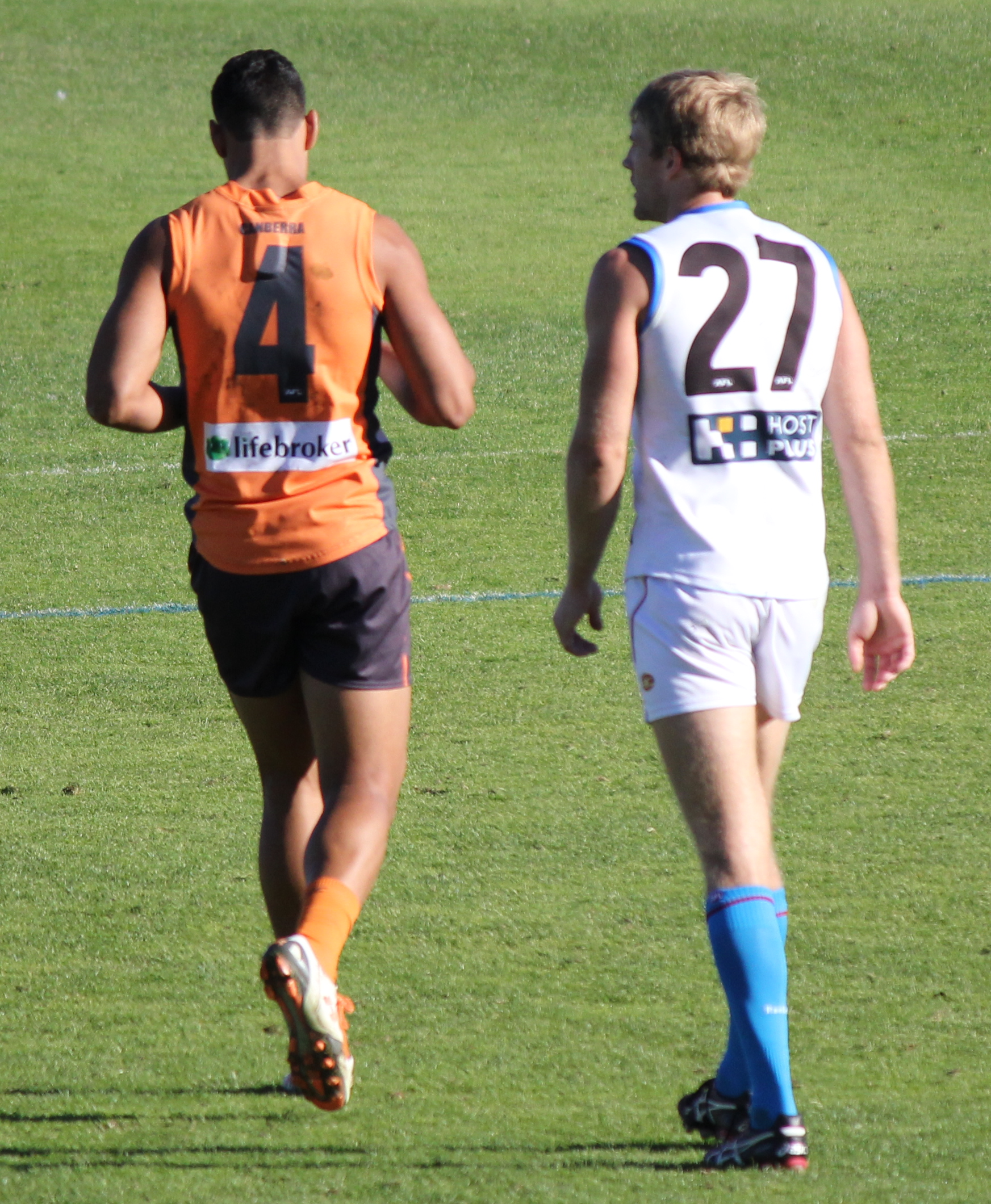
- Folau (left) in an AFL match against the Gold Coast Football Club at Manuka Oval during the 2012 season.

Personal information
- Debut: 24 March 2012, Greater Western Sydney vs. Sydney, at ANZ Stadium
- Position: Centre half-forward / Utility

Playing career^{1}
Years	Club	Games (Goals)
2011–2012	Greater Western Sydney	13 (2)
Total		13 (2)
- ^{1} Playing statistics correct to the end of Round 23, 2012.

=== Greater Western Sydney ===
As his contract with the Brisbane Broncos was set to expire at the end of the 2010 season Folau was linked to the Melbourne Rebels rugby union team in Super Rugby and had also been linked with a move to the Greater Western Sydney Giants, an Australian Football League (AFL) team. After a three-way bidding war between rugby league, rugby union and Australian rules football, Folau signed a deal with the expansion AFL team Greater Western Sydney, estimated to be worth up to $6 million over four years.

==== 2011 season ====
Folau began his Australian rules football playing career in the North East Australian Football League playing for the Greater Western Sydney Giants. Initially playing in defence and struggling to make an impact, it wasn't until GWS coach Kevin Sheedy moved him into the forward line that his performances improved, including 4 goals in a game against Queanbeyan Football Club.

==== 2012 season ====
Folau made his AFL debut in the Greater Western Sydney Giants first match in the competition, against the Sydney Swans in Round 1, 2012.

At the start of the season, Israel Folau was chosen to be one of 10 players announced by the AFL as that year's Multicultural Ambassadors. The then AFL CEO Andrew Demetriou remarked, "We're genuinely excited to provide 10 players with the opportunity to become leaders in the community, promoting the benefits of inclusion and diversity."

Folau gave up on his AFL career at the end of the 2012 season, with limited success on-field. Off-field, opinions were varied on whether the publicity surrounding him was helpful for the Giants and the AFL.

=== Australian rules football statistics ===
Season	Team	No.	Games	Disposals	Kicks	Handballs	Marks	Tackles	Hit Outs	Goals	Behinds
2011 (NEAFL)	GWS	4	15	*	*	*	*	*	*	25	1
2012 (AFL)	GWS	4	13	80	39	41	22	18	65	2	8
AFL Career Totals			13	80	39	41	22	18	65	2	8

== Rugby union career ==
=== New South Wales Waratahs ===
==== 2013–14 ====
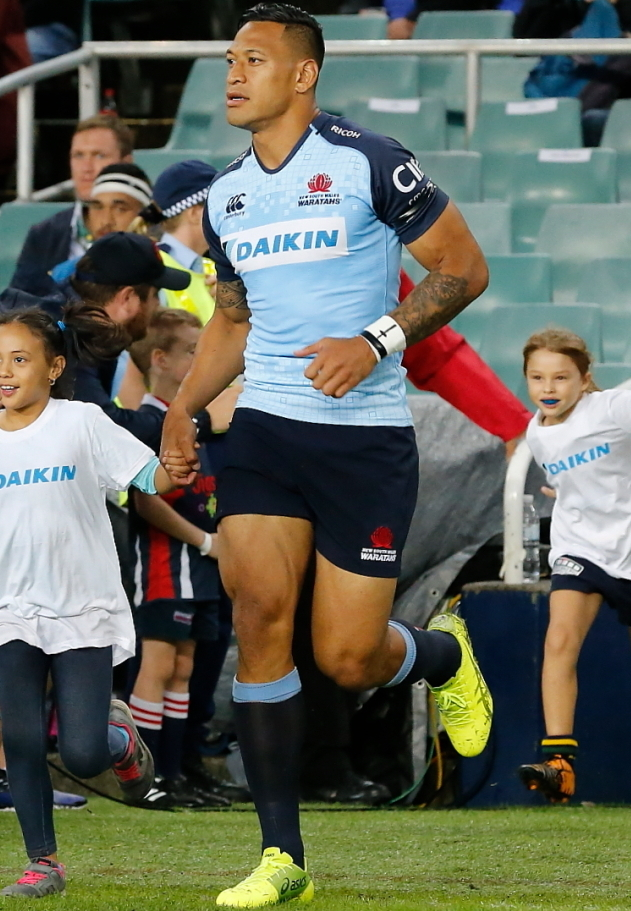
Folau with the New South Wales Waratahs

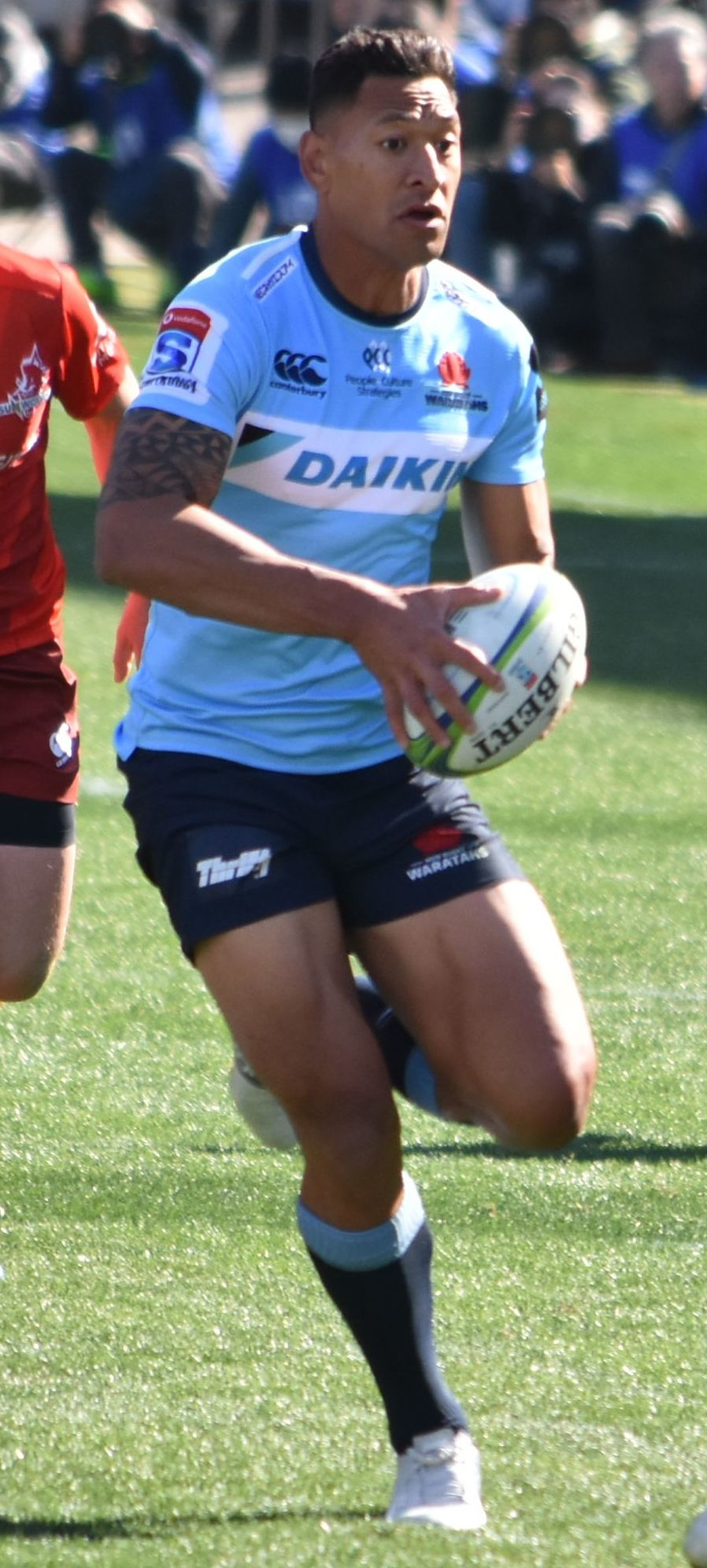
Folau against the Sunwolves in 2019.

In December 2012, it was announced that Folau, changing sports again, had joined Australian rugby union team the Sydney-based New South Wales Waratahs for the 2013 Super Rugby season, also announcing his ambition to play for the Australia national rugby team. It was also the first season for new coach Michael Cheika (whom later coached Folau as Australia coach). Melbourne Rebels Coach Damien Hill said he was sceptical about how the Waratahs, or any Super Rugby club, could fit Folau under the salary cap. Folau's potential positive impact in rugby union has been likened by several players and coaches to that of fellow league-turned-rugby star Sonny Bill Williams.

Speaking in early in 2013 about his Waratahs pre-season training, Folau said he was training at both fullback and wing. Folau also said he welcomed the advice and mentorship of dual international and former Waratah Lote Tuqiri regarding the switch between league and union. Folau scored two tries in a pre-season match against Australian conference rivals, the Melbourne Rebels.

Folau's first Super Rugby appearance for New South Wales was against long-time rivals Queensland in the second round (23 February 2013) of the season at Lang Park, Brisbane. Folau's debut try for the Waratahs came in the forty-seventh minute, and was the first Waratahs try of the match. The Waratahs lost 25–17. Folau's first home appearance with the Waratahs was in the third round against the Melbourne Rebels. Although Folau didn't score, and with the Waratahs having to fight back a ten-point deficit at half-time, the Waratahs won the match 31–26.

Overall, by season's end Folau had played a total of fourteen of the sixteen matches for the New South Wales Waratahs in his debut season. In the process, Folau racked up eight tries, tied second overall for the season. However, Folau's efforts were not enough for New South Wales to finish in a finals position. The Waratahs finished third in the Australian conference, and ninth overall (out of fifteen). Furthermore, the Waratahs had a balanced record of eight wins and eight losses, accruing a positive point differential of forty-five and taking five bonus points as well. A month post-season, Folau was named in the Australia squad against the British & Irish Lions, whom were on their 2013 tour of Australia.

==== 2015–16 ====
In July 2015, he signed a deal to play for NTT DoCoMo Red Hurricanes in the Japanese Top League. However, Folau did not play for the club due to injury and the relegation of the team to the Japanese second division.

In August 2015, Folau was named in the Wallabies 31-man squad for the 2015 Rugby World Cup in England.

Folau has been awarded the Rugby Australia John Eales Medal, the Wallabies' Player of the Year recognition, three times, in 2014, 2015 and 2017.

=== Japan ===
==== 2021–22 ====
On 5 July 2021 it was reported that Folau had switched back to play rugby union for Japanese club Shining Arcs Tokyo-Bay Urayasu (formerly NTT Communications). On his return to rugby union, Folau scored a double against Kobelco Kobe Steelers in round one of the 2022 Japan Rugby League One in Kobe Universiade Memorial Stadium. The Shining Arcs won 23–24.

2025–2026

In October 2026, Folau announced his retirement from professional rugby union.

=== Rugby union statistics ===
As of 10 May 2026

- denotes Super Rugby season champions.
- denotes played in seasons finals series.

Team	Comp.	Season	Matches					Disc.		Tries	Points	Try ratio
Team	Comp.	Season	P	W	D	L	%	(yellow card) Yel.	(red card) Red	Tries	Points	Try ratio
New South Wales Waratahs	Super Rugby	2013	14	7	0	7	50	0	0	8	40	.571
New South Wales Waratahs	Super Rugby	2014	14	12	0	2	86	1	0	12	60	.857
New South Wales Waratahs	Super Rugby	2015	17	11	0	6	65	0	0	5	25	.294
New South Wales Waratahs	Super Rugby	2016	15	8	0	7	53	1	0	11	55	.733
New South Wales Waratahs	Super Rugby	2017	15	4	0	11	27	0	0	9	45	.600
New South Wales Waratahs	Super Rugby	2018	14	7	1	6	50	0	0	11	55	.786
New South Wales Waratahs	Super Rugby	2019 (Note: The 2019 season was cut-short for Folau following his contract being terminated by Rugby Australia (RA).)	7	3	0	4	43	0	0	4	20	.571
Super Rugby Total			96	52	1	43	54	2	0	60	300	.625
Shining Arcs	League One – D1	2022	14	3	0	11	21	0	0	10	50	.714
Urayasu D-Rocks	League One – D2	2022–23	6	4	0	2	67	0	0	6	30	1.000
Urayasu D-Rocks	League One – D2	2023–24	2	2	0	0	100	0	0	1	5	.500
Urayasu D-Rocks	League One – D1	2024–25	8	1	0	7	13	0	0	2	10	.250
Urayasu D-Rocks	League One – D1	2025–26	8	2	0	6	25	1	0	8	40	1.000
Total			134	64	2	69	48	3	0	87	435	.649
Team	Comp.	Season	P	W	D	L	%	(yellow card) Yel.	(red card) Red	Tries	Points	Try ratio
Team	Comp.	Season	Matches					Disc.		Tries	Points	Try ratio

=== International rugby union ===
==== Australia ====
Folau made his international debut for Australia against the British & Irish Lions on the 2013 British & Irish Lions tour to Australia. Folau, scoring the first try of the game in the first game of the series, scored twice on 22 June at Suncorp Stadium, Brisbane, Queensland.

In the 2013 Autumn tour, Folau scored his tenth try of the season against Wales and equalled the tally of Lote Tuqiri.

Folau is the fourth highest try scoring Australian international player, behind Adam Ashley-Cooper, Chris Latham and David Campese.

==== Tonga ====
In 2021 World Rugby altered the eligibility rules for players who had already played for another country. The rule allowed players to play for a second country if they had a "stand-down period of three years", among other requirements. Given the rule change, and Folau's 'parental-link' eligibility, he would be allowed to represent Tonga from 2022 onwards. Coach Toutai Kefu, keen on having Folau play for Tonga, said of the decision: "We'd definitely be interested... We're not in a position to bypass players of Israel's calibre. We'd welcome him with open arms." Folau also expressed his eagerness to play for Tonga, in a concise quip to Kefu: 'Yeah, I'm keen to go'. The rule change would allow six or seven players to immediately represent Tonga, alongside Folau.

In 2022 it was speculated that Folau would play for Tonga in the Pacific Nations Cup, which would include Australia A. Following confirmation of a four-team Pacific Nations Cup in July 2022, namely Tonga, Samoa, Fiji and Australia A, Tonga coach Toutai Kefu said Folau's eligibility is due to be reviewed by World Rugby and hopes to bring the former Wallaby in to play in the tournament. On 27 May 2022, it was announced that Folau, along with well-known former New Zealand internationals Charles Piutau, Malakai Fekitoa and Augustine Pulu, were selected for the Tonga squad ahead of the Pacific Nations Cup in July.

Folau made his international debut for Tonga in the first round (2 July 2022) of the 2022 Pacific Nations Cup against hosts Fiji. Folau was taken off after approximately a half-hour of play having obtained a hamstring injury. Folau and Tonga were kept scoreless, losing 36–0.

== Sponsorships ==
In 2009, Folau was offered sponsorships by Adidas and Powerade and, in 2013, by Goodman Fielder.

His sponsorship deal with Asics was terminated in 2019 after he was found guilty of breaching Rugby Australia's player code of conduct.

== Personal life ==
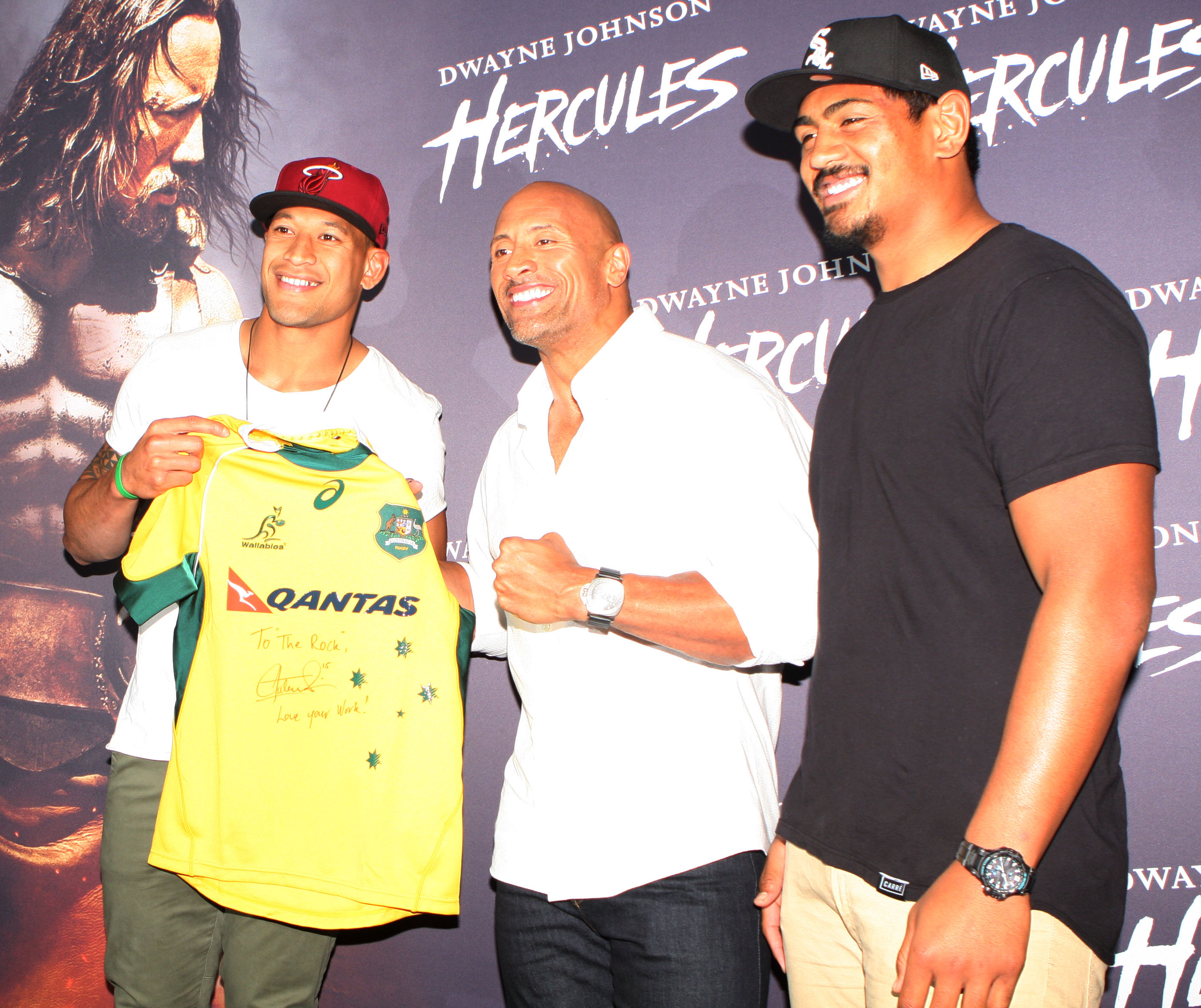
Israel Folau with Dwayne Johnson and Will Skelton in 2014

Folau has a sister and four brothers. He is the older brother of John Folau, who is also a rugby union player.

"Israel Folau Street" was named in his honour in October 2010 in a suburb of Goodna, Queensland, where Folau played junior rugby league.

On 23 October 2016, Folau announced his engagement to New Zealand netball player Maria Tuta'ia. They were married outdoors on a private estate in Kangaroo Valley, New South Wales on 15 November 2017.

== Religious views ==
Folau grew up as a Mormon, but moved to being an active member of the Assemblies of God Christian denomination in 2011. His father, Eni Folau, is a pastor. Folau has credited his relationship with God as a reason for his athletic success in the NRL, AFL and rugby union. In a 2017 article for Players Voice, Folau wrote that he reads the Bible every day and that faith in Jesus Christ is the "cornerstone of every single thing in my life" and "I believe that it is a loving gesture to share passages from the Bible with others. I do it all the time when people ask me questions about my faith or things relating to their lives, whether that's in-person or on my social media accounts." Folau is nontrinitarian. He has been described as a fundamentalist Christian.

=== Same-sex marriage ===
In 2017, the Turnbull government called a national postal survey on the question of changing Australian law to recognise same-sex marriage. In September, the ARU management declared the Wallabies in support of the change, prompting Folau to announce his personal opposition a day later on Twitter, where he wrote: "I love and respect all people for who they are and their opinions. but personally, I will not support gay marriage." Folau later wrote in Players Voice: "I didn't agree with Bill Pulver taking a stance on the same-sex marriage vote on behalf of the whole organisation, but I understand the reasons behind why he did."

=== Homosexuality ===
In March 2015, Israel Folau, playing for the New South Wales Waratahs Rugby team, told ABC radio that there was no room for homophobia in the game, amidst allegations of homophobic sledging originating from a player on his team, and denied there was homophobia in his club.

Folau's religious views became a subject of controversy in April 2018, when a follower of his Instagram account asked him what God's "plan for homosexuals" was, and Folau replied: "Hell.. unless they repent of their sins and turn to God."

Folau later wrote in Players Voice "My response to the question is what I believe God's plan is for all sinners, according to my understanding of my Bible teachings, specifically 1 Corinthians 6:9–10". The tweet led to accusations of homophobia against Folau and of religious discrimination against him by accusers. The Wallabies chief sponsor Qantas condemned Folau's comments, announcing: "We've made clear to Rugby Australia that we find the comments very disappointing." Rugby Australia's CEO, Raelene Castle, said that they accepted Folau's position, though they did not agree with his views, and he would not be sanctioned by the organisation.

Folau wrote: "Since my social media posts were publicised, it has been suggested that I am homophobic and bigoted and that I have a problem with gay people. This could not be further from the truth. I fronted the cover of the Star Observer magazine to show my support for the Bingham Cup, which is an international gay rugby competition for both men and women. I believe in inclusion. In my heart, I know I do not have any phobia towards anyone."

=== Gender optional birth certificates ===
On Wednesday, 10 April 2019, the Tasmanian Parliament passed amendments to the Birth, Deaths and Marriages Registration Act to allow gender to be changed on Birth Certificates by a simple statutory declaration. Later on that day on his personal Twitter account, Folau posted a screenshot of the news headline that read: "Tasmania becomes first Australian jurisdiction to make gender optional on birth certificates". Folau then tweeted: 'The devil has blinded so many people in this world. Repent and turn away from your evil ways. Turn to Jesus Christ who will set you free".

In response, Andy Brennan, Australia's only openly gay male professional soccer player at the time, said "If I was 16 years old and reading what he said, it would have made me feel awful", and "You can't let negativity win, otherwise what [Folau] says wins."

=== Bible verses ===
Some hours later, in his personal Instagram account, Folau posted a screenshot of a meme, quoting 1 Corinthians 6:9–10 "WARNING Drunks, Homosexuals, Adulterers, Liars, Fornicators, Thieves, Atheists, Idolators HELL AWAITS YOU. REPENT! ONLY JESUS SAVES". Folau, in the same Instagram post also quoted Galatians 5:19–21, and two verses on repentance, salvation and justification, Acts 2:38 and Acts 17:30. Rugby Australia immediately denounced the post as homophobic. The next day, (11 April 2019) Rugby Australia announced their intention to terminate his contract "in the absence of compelling mitigating factors", and said they had been unable to contact him. Folau's post and the actions of Rugby Australia divided opinion amongst players and supporters and ignited a human rights debate across Australia, with Rugby Australia arguing its "inclusiveness" policy had been breached, and others calling for tolerance of the expression of religious views. Ahead of his disciplinary hearing, Folau expressed a determination to continue playing rugby, while still holding to his beliefs.

=== Church sermons ===
Delivering a sermon at his church on Easter Sunday at the height of the controversy, he broke down while recalling the words from the Bible, Matthew 16:26, "For what shall it profit a man if he gains the whole world, and loses his own soul?"

Folau, in a church sermon, said that the devil is behind primary school children being allowed to decide if they wanted to change gender by taking away the permission of their parents. He also said homosexuality is a sin.

In November 2019, Folau was criticised following his preaching in regards to same-sex marriage and abortion. Quoting from the Book of Isaiah he said he believes the scripture is talking to Australia, and said, "Look how rapid these bushfires, these droughts, have come in a short period of time. Do you think it's a coincidence or not? God is speaking to you guys." In response, the Australian Prime Minister Scott Morrison described Folau's remarks as "appallingly insensitive".

== Legal proceedings ==
In May 2019, a Code of Conduct hearing was undertaken, during which the CEO of Rugby Australia, Raelene Castle, suggested she would have terminated Folau's contract if he had "photocopied Bible passages" and posted them to his social media. Folau was found to have breached Rugby Australia's code of conduct, and later that month he lost a sponsorship deal with ASICS. On 17 May 2019, his 4-year employment contract with Rugby Australia was terminated early, ending his career with the Waratahs and the Wallabies.

At the May 2019 hearing, Folau said that at least 15 teammates and members of the coaching staff had either provided him with messages of support and/or urged for his return to the playing field.

On 6 June 2019, Folau launched legal proceedings with the Fair Work Commission against Rugby Australia and the Waratahs under section 772 of the Fair Work Act, which makes it unlawful to terminate employment on the basis of religion. Folau launched a GoFundMe crowdfunding campaign in mid-June and sought to raise $3 million to cover his legal costs. Some of his former teammates described Folau's appeal as selfish and greedy. Folau was also criticised for seeking crowdfunded money despite accumulating a multi-million dollar fortune. The appeal included a statement that "there will be no obligations on Israel Folau to ... apply the funds in any particular way". On 24 June 2019, GoFundMe shut down Folau's fundraising campaign, stating that it violated GoFundMe's terms of service by promoting discrimination or exclusion, and that all donations would be refunded. In a response to the termination of Folau's GoFundMe campaign, the Australian Christian Lobby (ACL) announced on 25 June 2019 that it was donating $100,000 to Folau, was setting up an alternate donation site, and that any funds raised would only be used for his legal costs. The second campaign raised over $2 million in two days before being paused by the ACL with Folau's consent.

On 19 July 2019, the Fair Work Commission issued a certificate confirming all reasonable attempts to resolve the dispute between Folau and Rugby Australia had been unsuccessful. On 1 August 2019, Folau launched legal action in the Federal Circuit Court of Australia, against RA and NSW Rugby for unlawful termination on the basis of religion, breach of contract and restraint of trade. Folau sought an apology, compensation, penalties and the right to play rugby union again.

In November 2019, Folau increased his compensation claim against Rugby Australia to $14 million, claiming that he could have been a Wallabies captain. This claim was viewed with bemusement and ridicule from past and present Australian rugby union players, as Folau had never held a captaincy or vice-captaincy position with any of the football teams he had been a part of.

Folau and Rugby Australia issued a joint statement and apology on 4 December 2019 that stated no harm had been intended by either party and announced that a confidential settlement had been reached.

In December 2019, the Anti-Discrimination Board of NSW decided to investigate a complaint by homosexual activist Garry Burns that Folau had engaged in homosexuality vilification. The case was rejected and dismissed during April 2020 initial proceedings, and was found to be of collateral purpose, as a means to pressure the respondent to settle with him.

== Other controversies ==
After Folau signed for the Catalans Dragons in 2020, he caused controversy again, in the first game of the season against St Helens, being the only player of both teams refusing to take the knee, as a symbol of solidarity against police brutality and racism.

== Honours ==
=== Individual ===
==== Rugby league ====
- 2007: Dally M Rookie of the Year
- 2007: Australian Young Performer of the Year (Fairfax Sports Performer Awards)
- 2007: International Newcomer of the Year (RLIF Awards)
- 2008: State of Origin Man-of-the-Match (Game 3, 2008)
- 2008: Dally M Centre of the Year

=== Team ===
==== Rugby league ====
- 2007: NRL Premiers (Melbourne Storm) (stripped)
- 2008: NRL Minor Premiers (Melbourne Storm) (stripped)

==== Rugby union ====
- 2014: Super Rugby Winners (New South Wales Waratahs)

=== Representative ===
==== Rugby league ====
- 2007: All-time Youngest Australian International Player (18 years and 194 days)
- 2007–09: Australian Kangaroos Test Squad (3 Tests)
- 2008: Australian Rugby League World Cup Squad (5 Matches)
- 2008–10: Queensland State of Origin Squad (8 Matches)

==== Rugby union ====
- 2015: Rugby Championship Winners
- 2015: Rugby World Cup Runners-up

=== National Rugby League Records ===
- 2007: Most Tries in a Debut Season (21)
