= Mark Mom =

PNG international rugby league footballer

Personal information
- Born: 27 August 1974 (age 50); Papua New Guinea

Playing information
- Position: Five-eighth, Halfback, Hooker, Lock
Representative
Years	Team	Pld	T	G	FG	P
1996–2001	Papua New Guinea	8	0	0	0	0

Mark Mom is a Papua New Guinean rugby league footballer who represented Papua New Guinea in the 2000 World Cup.

== Playing career ==
Mom attended St John's College, Woodlawn in Australia and played for the Australian Schoolboys' side.

In 1994 he played for the Papua New Guinea side at the 1994 World Sevens.

Between 1996 and 2001 he played eight test matches for the Kumuls, including four at the 2000 World Cup.
