= List of international rugby union tries by Israel Folau =

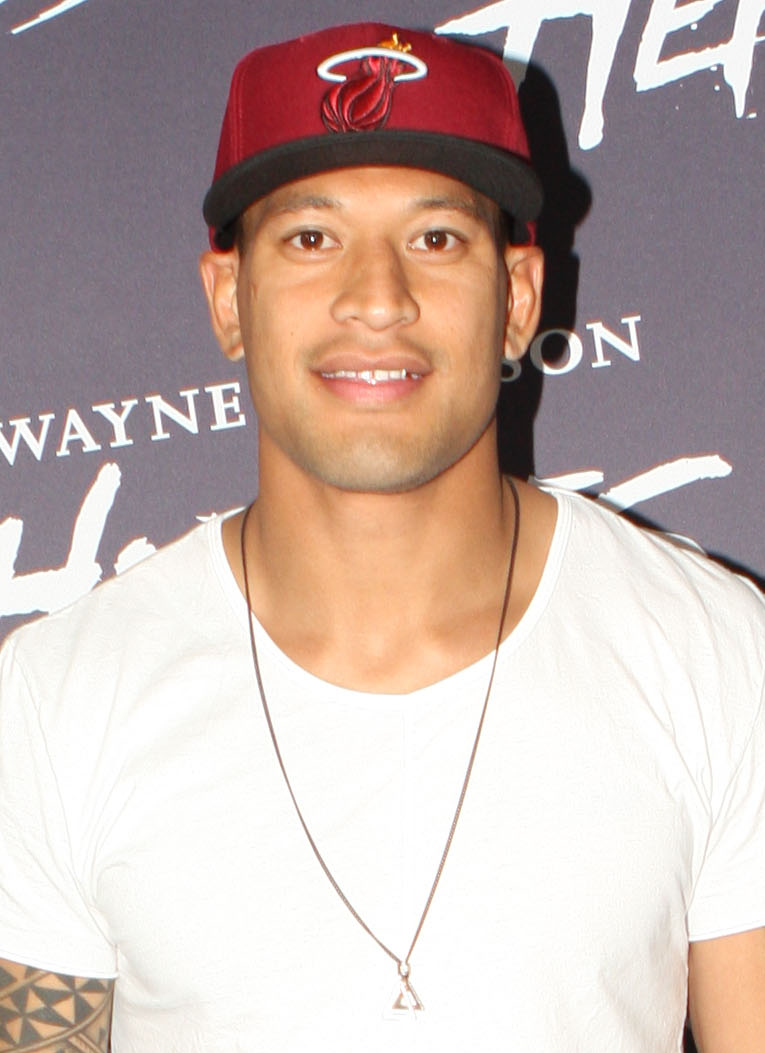
Israel Folau, 2014

Israel Folau is a Tongan Australian international rugby union player. Folau started his international career with Australia (2013–2019) and primarily played as a fullback for them, however was deployed as a wing and also an outside centre as well. While Folau was playing for Australia internationally, he played for the New South Wales Waratahs in the Super Rugby. He made his international debut for Australia against the British & Irish Lions during their 2013 tour series, scoring the first try of the match.

Folau scored thirty-seven tries in seventy-three matches for Australia, and became the fourth highest try-scoring Australian player.

In 2021, following rule changes made by World Rugby, Folau was eligible to play for Tonga. Folau was selected to the Tonga squad for the 2022 Pacific Nations Cup.

== International tries ==
=== List of International tries ===
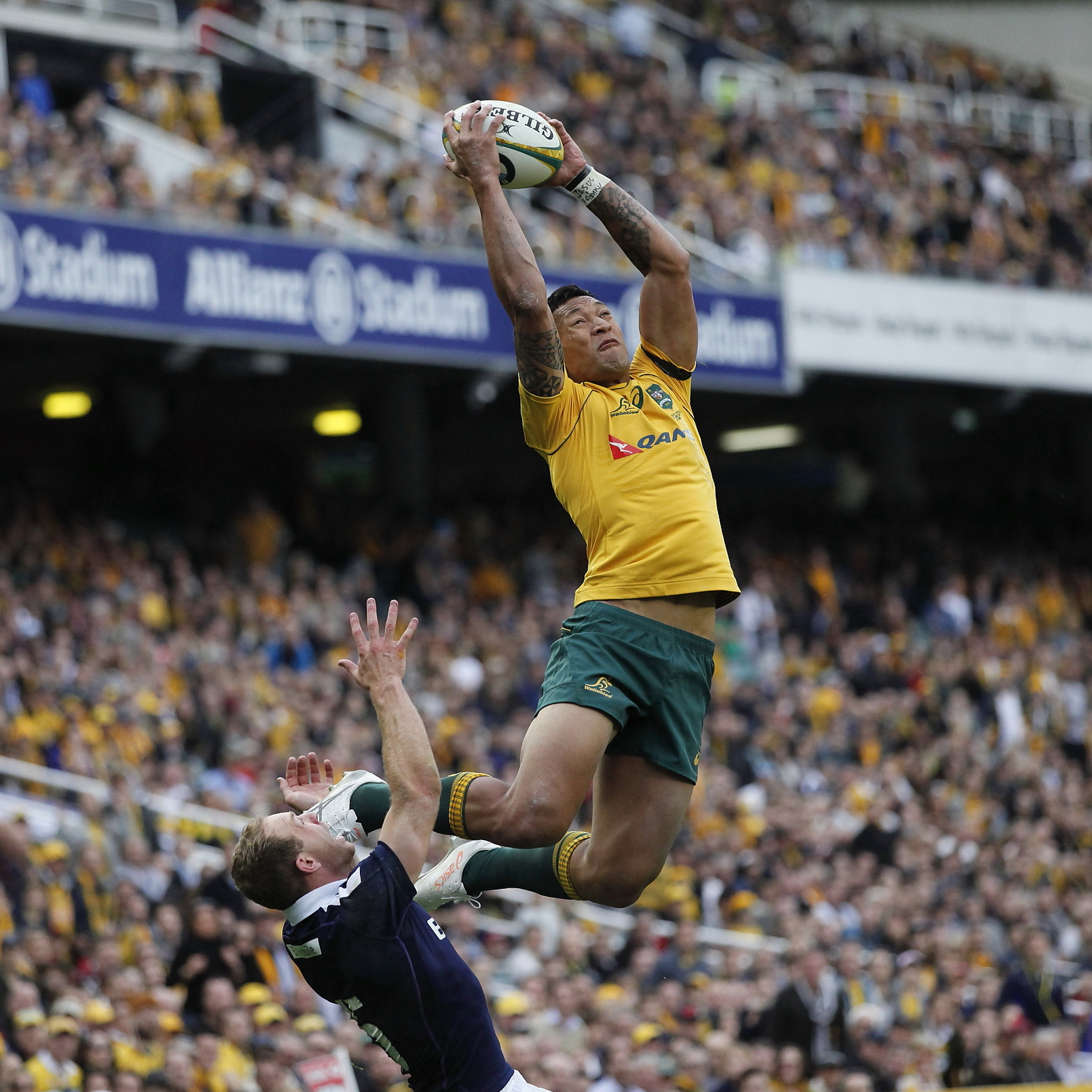
Folau in 2017 against Scotland

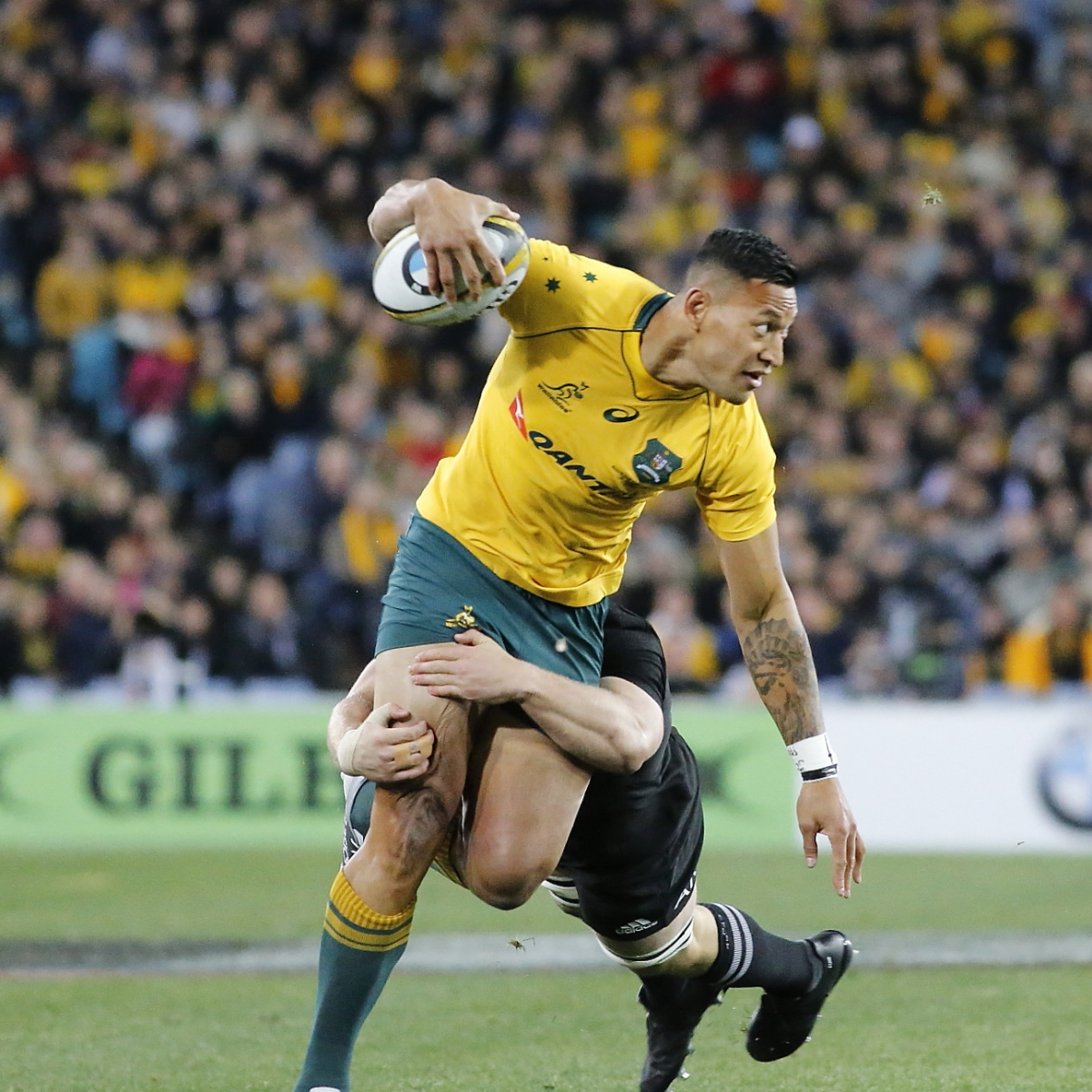
Folau against New Zealand in 2017

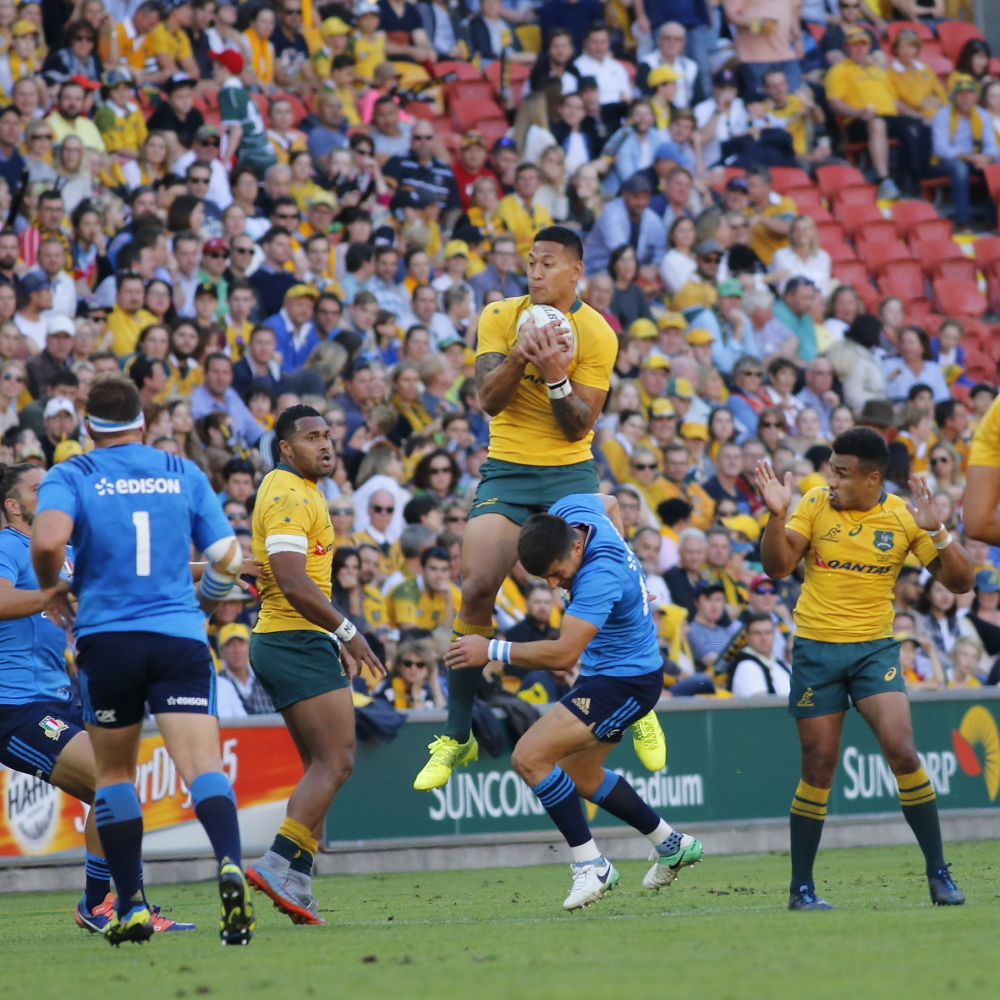
Folau catching the ball vs. Italy, 2017

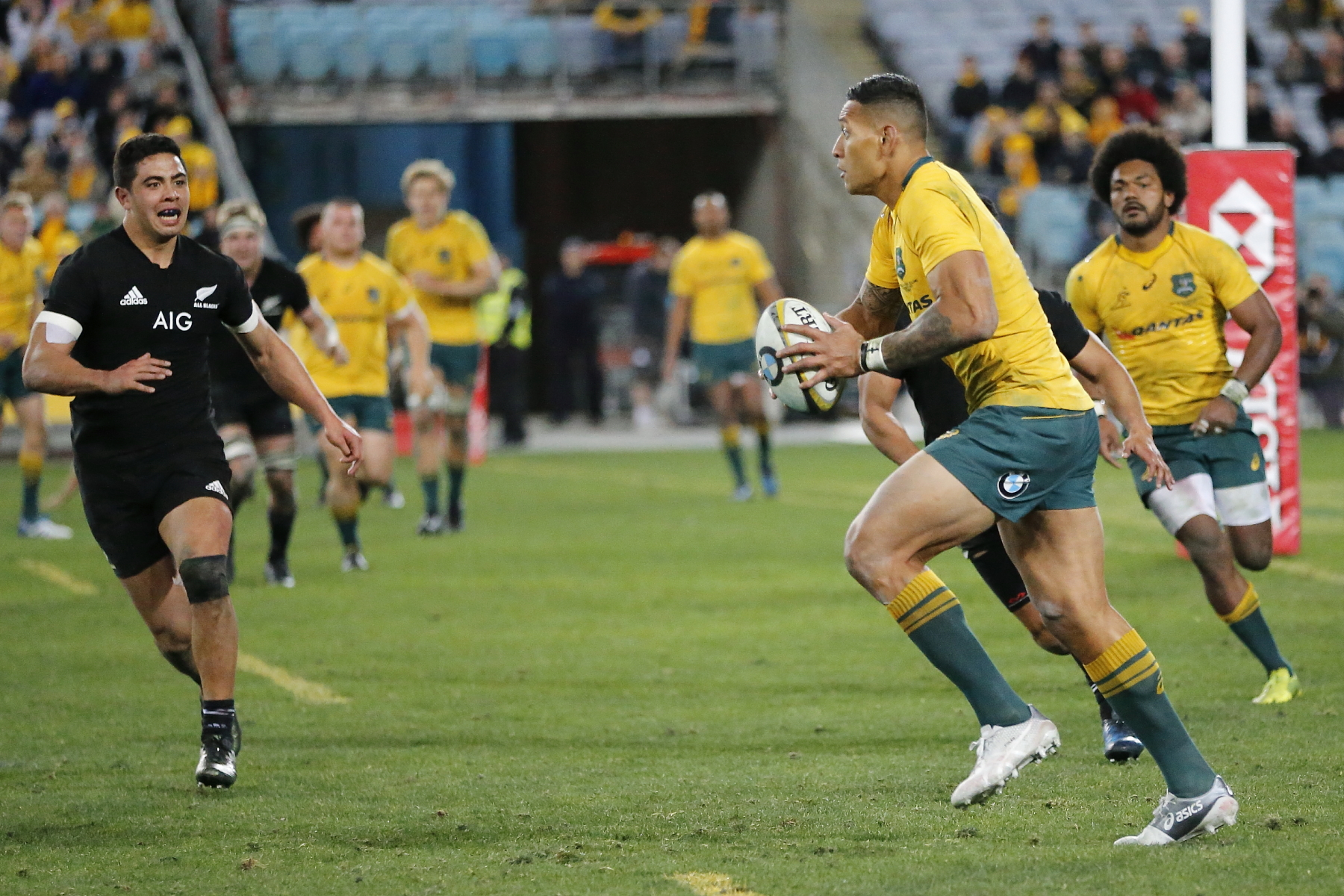
Folau in Bledisloe game I, 2017

International tries
No.	Opponent	Location	Competition	Date	Result	Ref.
Tries for Australia
1	British & Irish Lions	Lang Park, Brisbane	2013 British & Irish Lions tour of Australia	22 June 2013	21–23	
2	British & Irish Lions	Lang Park, Brisbane	2013 British & Irish Lions tour of Australia	22 June 2013	21–23	
3	New Zealand	Wellington Regional Stadium, Wellington	2013 Rugby Championship	24 August 2013	27–16	
4	Argentina	Subiaco Oval, Perth	2013 Rugby Championship	14 September 2013	14–13	
5	Argentina	Estadio Gigante de Arroyito, Rosario	2013 Rugby Championship	5 October 2013	17–54	
6	Argentina	Estadio Gigante de Arroyito, Rosario	2013 Rugby Championship	5 October 2013	17–54	
7	Argentina	Estadio Gigante de Arroyito, Rosario	2013 Rugby Championship	5 October 2013	17–54	
8	Italy	Stadio Olimpico Grande Torino, Turin	2013 Autumn International	9 November 2013	20–50	
9	Scotland	Murrayfield Stadium, Edinburgh	2013 Autumn International	23 November 2013	15–21	
10	Wales	Millennium Stadium, Cardiff	2013 Autumn International	30 November 2013	26–30	
11	France	Lang Park, Brisbane	2014 France tour of Australia	7 June 2014	50–23	
12	France	Sydney Football Stadium, Sydney	2014 France tour of Australia	21 June 2014	39–13	
13	France	Sydney Football Stadium, Sydney	2014 France tour of Australia	21 June 2014	39–13	
14	New Zealand	Eden Park, Auckland	2014 Rugby Championship	23 August 2014	51–20	
15	South Africa	Subiaco Oval, Perth	2014 Rugby Championship	6 September 2014	24–23	
16	Wales	Millennium Stadium, Cardiff	2014 Autumn International	8 November 2014	28–33	
17	Wales	Millennium Stadium, Cardiff	2014 Autumn International	8 November 2014	28–33	
18	New Zealand	Eden Park, Auckland	2015 Rugby World Cup warm-up match	15 August 2015	41–13	
19	England	Lang Park, Brisbane	2016 England tour of Australia	11 June 2016	28–39	
20	England	Sydney Football Stadium, Sydney	2016 England tour of Australia	25 June 2016	40–44	
21	Fiji	Melbourne Rectangular Stadium, Melbourne	2017 June International	10 June 2017	37–14	
22	Fiji	Melbourne Rectangular Stadium, Melbourne	2017 June International	10 June 2017	37–14	
23	Scotland	Sydney Football Stadium, Sydney	2017 June International	17 June 2017	19–24	
24	Scotland	Sydney Football Stadium, Sydney	2017 June International	17 June 2017	19–24	
25	Italy	Lang Park, Brisbane	2017 June International	24 June 2017	40–27	
26	Italy	Lang Park, Brisbane	2017 June International	24 June 2017	40–27	
27	New Zealand	Stadium Australia, Sydney	2017 Rugby Championship	19 August 2017	34–54	
28	New Zealand	Forsyth Barr Stadium, Dunedin	2017 Rugby Championship	26 August 2017	35–29	
29	Argentina	Canberra Stadium, Canberra	2017 Rugby Championship	16 September 2017	45–20	
30	Argentina	Canberra Stadium, Canberra	2017 Rugby Championship	16 September 2017	45–20	
31	South Africa	Free State Stadium, Bloemfontein	2017 Rugby Championship	30 September 2017	27–27	
32	New Zealand	Lang Park, Brisbane	2017 Autumn International	21 October 2017	23–18	
33	Argentina	Robina Stadium, Gold Coast	2018 Rugby Championship	15 September 2018	19–23	
34	Argentina	Estadio Padre Ernesto Martearena, Salta	2018 Rugby Championship	6 October 2018	34–45	
35	New Zealand	Int. Stadium Yokohama, Yokohama (Japan)	2018 Autumn International	27 October 2018	37–20	
36	England	Twickenham Stadium, London	2018 Autumn International	24 November 2018	37–18	
37	England	Twickenham Stadium, London	2018 Autumn International	24 November 2018	37–18	
Tries for Tonga
To be determined

=== Tries by opponent ===
International tries by opponent
Opponent	Matches					Tries	Try ratio
Opponent	P	W	D	L	%	Tries	Try ratio
Tries for Australia
Argentina	12	10	0	2	83	8	0.667
New Zealand	17	2	1	14	12	7	0.412
England	8	1	0	7	13	4	0.500
Italy	3	3	0	0	100	3	1.000
Scotland	3	2	0	1	67	3	1.000
France	4	3	0	1	75	3	0.750
Wales	5	4	0	1	80	3	0.600
Fiji	2	2	0	0	100	2	1.000
British & Irish Lions	3	1	0	2	33	2	0.667
South Africa	10	3	2	5	30	2	0.200
Ireland	6	2	0	4	33	0	0.000
Tries for Tonga
Australia A	1	1	0	0	0	0	0.000
Fiji	1	0	0	1	0	0	0.000
Total	75	34	3	38	45	37	0.493
Opponent	P	W	D	L	%	Tries	Try ratio
Opponent	Matches					Tries	Try ratio

Hat-tricks
Opponent	Location	Competition	Date	Result
Argentina	Estadio Gigante de Arroyito, Rosario	2013 Rugby Championship	5 October 2013	17–54

Tries per year; ratio
Year	Caps	Tries	Try ratio
2013	15	10	0.67
2014	14	7	0.50
2015	9	1	0.11
2016	14	2	0.14
2017	10	12	1.20
2018	11	5	0.45
2022	1	0	—N/a
2023	1	0	—N/a
