= McConkie Tauasa =

Samoa international rugby league footballer

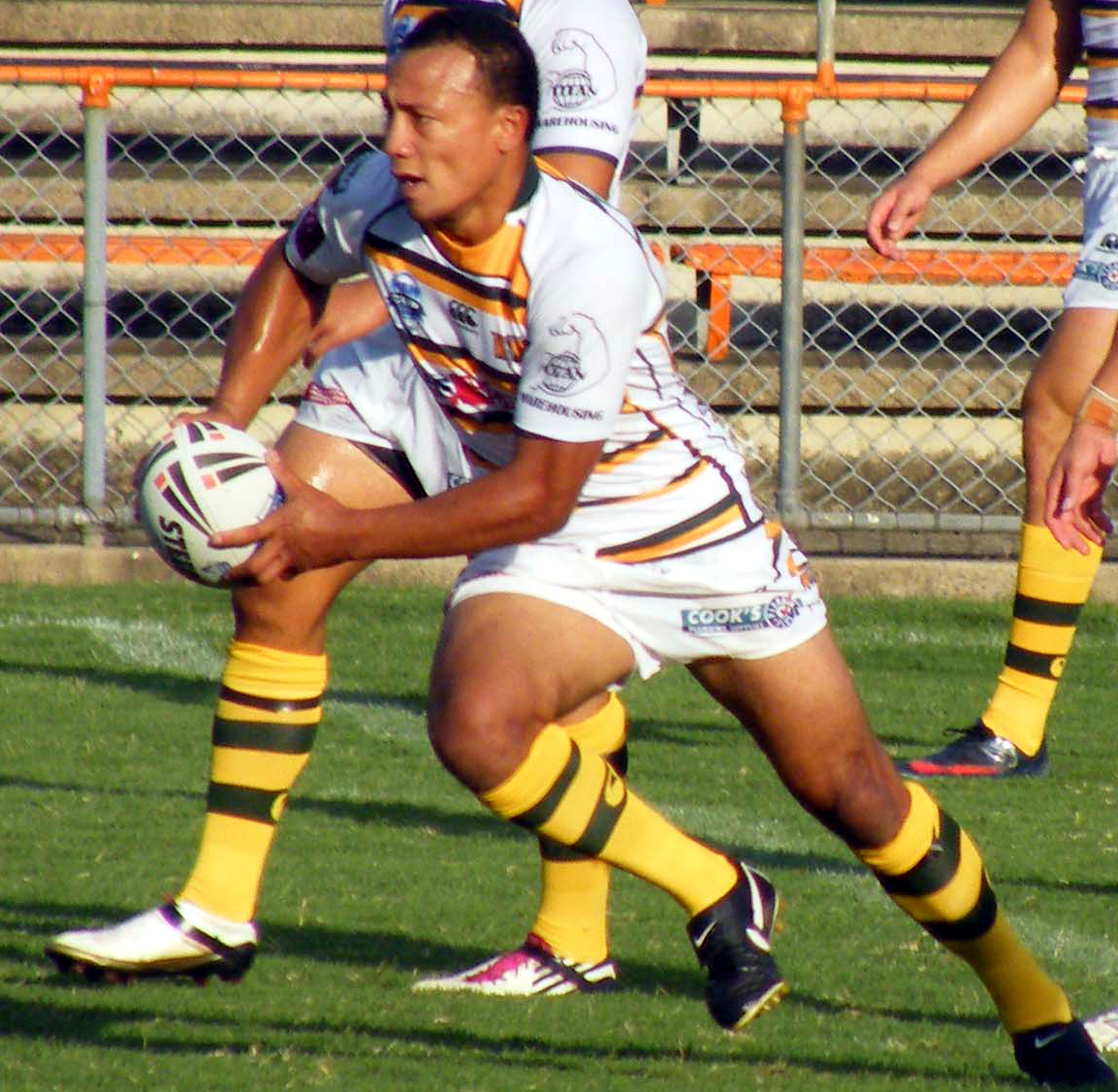

Personal information
- Born: Sauniatu, Atua, Samoa

Playing information
- Position: Wing
Representative
Years	Team	Pld	T	G	FG	P
2006	Samoa	5	1	0	0	4

McConkie Tauasa is a former Samoa international rugby league footballer who played as a centre or on the wing.

He played for the Windsor Wolves in the New South Wales Cup and was contracted to the Penrith Panthers in the NRL.
