= Endeavour Sports High School =

Location
- Caringbah, Southern Sydney, New South Wales; Australia; 34°01′50″S 151°07′04″E

Information
- Former name: Endeavour High School
- Type: Government-funded co-educational comprehensive and specialist secondary day school
- Motto: Honour Bound
- Established: 1964; 62 years ago (as Endeavour High School)
- School district: Sutherland; Metropolitan South
- Educational authority: New South Wales Department of Education
- Specialist: Sports school
- Principal: James Kozlowski
- Years: 7–12
- Enrolment: ~1,000 (2016)
- Campus type: Suburban
- Colours: Red and black
- Affiliation: NSW Sports High Schools Association
- Website: endeavour-h.schools.nsw.gov.au

Endeavour Sports High School (abbreviated as ESHS) is a government-funded co-educational comprehensive and specialist secondary day school, with speciality in sports, located in Caringbah, a southern suburb of Sydney, New South Wales, Australia.

Established in 1964 as Endeavour High School, the school caters to approximately 1,000 students from Year 7 to Year 12. It is a selective, comprehensive co-educational school which bases its enrolment on students being proficient in a targeted sport or living in the relatively small local catchment area of the school. The school is operated by the New South Wales Department of Education; the principal is James Kozlowski.

Endeavour Sports High School is a member of the NSW Sports High Schools Association. The school's alumni include many former and current sportspeople, and Endeavour Sports High School is well regarded in its sporting development of its students.

== History ==
The school was established in 1964, and became a designated sports school in 1997.

== Sports ==
Sports offered at Endeavour Sports High School include athletics, Australian rules football, gymnastics, baseball, basketball, cheerleading, cricket, dance, hockey, netball, rugby league, rugby union, softball, swimming, soccer, tennis.

== Notable alumni ==
=== Rugby league ===
- Blake Ayshford
- Reece Blayney
- Fa'amanu Brown
- Mitch Brown
- Jess Caine
- Tony Caine
- Warren Carney
- Ryan Carr
- Beau Champion
- Anthony Cherrington
- Damien Cook
- Cameron Cullen
- Andrew Dallalana
- Kurt Dillon
- Daniel Fepuleai
- Blake Ferguson
- Bryson Goodwin
- Isaac Gordon
- Jamayne Isaako
- Alex Johnston
- Adam Keighran
- William Kennedy Jr
- Cameron King
- Shaun Lane
- Joseph Leilua
- Luciano Leilua
- Rhys Lovegrove
- Billy Magoulias
- Nesiasi Mataitonga
- Penani Manumalealii
- Luke Metcalf
- Paul Momirovski
- Peewee Moke
- Tyrone Munro
- Kevin Naiqama
- Rory O'Brien
- John Olive
- Mosese Pangai
- Frank Pele
- Justin Poore
- Reece Robson
- Barry Russell
- Scott Sorensen
- Curtis Scott
- Chase Stanley
- Kyle Stanley
- Chevy Stewart
- Brad Takairangi
- Martin Taupau
- Frank Winterstein
- Dean Whare
- Reece Williams
- Teig Wilton
- Bronson Xerri

=== Soccer ===
- Antonio Arena
- Mya Callil
- Ben Folami
- Dylan Fox
- Jake Girdwood-Reich
- Ayman Gulasi
- Angelique Hristodoulou
- Aleksandar Jovanović
- Tomi Juric
- Hayden Matthews
- Themba Muata-Marlow
- Michael Neill
- Teresa Polias
- Peta Trimis
- Nikolas Tsattalios
- Max Vartuli
- Marc Warren

=== Rugby union ===
- Luke Hume
- Brackin Karauria-Henry
- Brandon Paenga-Amosa
- De Wet Roos
- Ben Volavola
- Sera Naiqama

=== Swimmer ===
- Mitchell Kilduff
- Simon Cowley
- Amanda Reid
- Craig Stevens

=== Basketball ===
- Kate Gaze
- Ashleigh Karaitiana

=== Others ===
Moisés Henriques field at Endeavour Sports High School

- James Bell, AFL player
- Moises Henriques, cricket player
- Sarah Kemp, golfer
- Abbey McCulloch, netball player
- Kaarle McCulloch, cyclist
- Stacey McManus, softball player
- Rahim Mundine, boxer
- George Kambosos, boxer

== See also ==
- List of government schools in New South Wales
- Selective school (New South Wales)
- Education in Australia
