= Garry Burns =

Anti-homosexual vilification campaigner

Garry Burns is an Australian lawfare activist, serial litigant, and LGBTIQA+ activist. He is known for complaints and litigation in relation to homosexual vilification against public figures such as Jeff Kennett, Bob Katter, and Israel Folau. His cases have tested provisions of the New South Wales Anti-Discrimination Act 1977 and the jurisdictional limitation of tribunals.

== Personal experience of hate crimes ==
In 1988, amidst a series of gay hate crimes across Sydney, three young people dragged Burns to the cliffs off Bondi's Marks Parks and threatened to throw him off for being gay. According to Burns, this experience - and other gay-hate crimes - left him with post-traumatic shock disorder and motivated him to "ensure hatred and vilification are not part of the Australian psyche".

== Activism and public commentary ==
Burns has been one of Australia's best known LGBTIQA+ activists, receiving both praise and criticism for his advocacy.

In 2010, Burns stated he would "throw a tantrum" outside Labor MP Kirsten Livermore's office if she did not address homophobia. This instance followed a Roy Morgan study that revealed 45% of her electorate thought that homosexuality was immoral. In 2013, he called on the NSW State Government to defund ACON after a rise in the state's HIV infections. In 2014, Burns claimed that Ian Thorpe had kept his homosexuality hidden because of the fear of "losing huge sponsorship deals."

In 2020, Mark Latham introduced a private member's bill in NSW Parliament to change the way that complaints are handled by the anti-discrimination board, in part due to Burns' litigation. Latham stated in an interview with the Catholic Weekly that gay activists had been targeting Christians and other vulnerable people in the community through the anti-discrimination laws.

== Australian Federal Elections ==
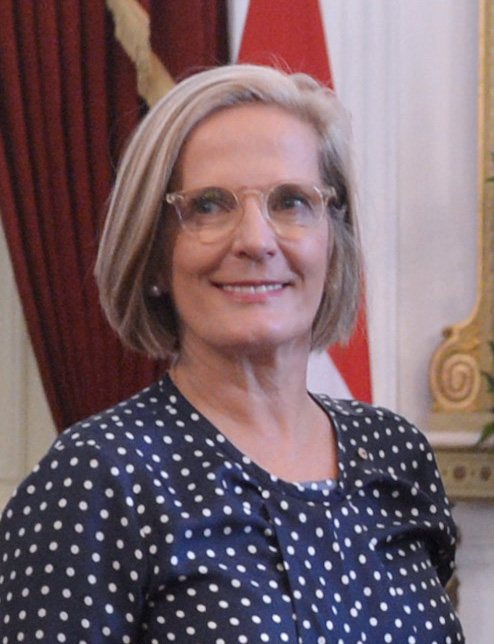
Lucy Turnbull in 2015

In the 2007 Australian Federal Election, Burns volunteered for George Newhouse, who was the Labor candidate in the seat of Wentworth, running against the incumbent and future Prime Minister, Malcom Turnbull. During the campaign, Burns allegedly verbally abused and intimidated Turnbull's wife, Lucy Turnbull. The following day, Burns sent an email to Malcolm Turnbull stating that there would be more angry homosexuals like Burns attacking Turnbull in public because of his "fascist leader" John Howard, whom Burns accused of treating gay people as second-class citizens. He described Turbull's wife as a "middle-aged, well-dressed 'fag hag' impersonator of a wife" and Turnbull as a "weak and pathetic excuse for a human being. Burns was subsequently sacked from his volunteer position. In the 2010 Australian Federal Election, Burns considered challenging Turnbull if someone provided him with the necessary funds. He criticised Turnbull for "poncing around the place wanting to become prime minister".

== Complaints and litigation ==
Burns has lodged over 100 complaints to the NSW Anti-Discrimination Board, including 36 vilification or victimisation complaints against Queensland Senate Candidate Bernard Gaynor during a period of 32 months. Gaynor stated that Burns' actions caused his life to become "a living nightmare" and resulted in over $300,000 in legal expenses, forcing Gaynor to sell his house. In 2020, Burns stated that he had won around 62 out of 65 proceedings.

The elements of homosexual vilification under NSW Anti-Discrimination legislation are that it is:

1. A public act,
2. That could incite hatred, serious contempt, or severe ridicule towards a person or group,
3. Because of the homosexuality of that person or group.

=== Burns v Dye (2008) ===
Background: Mr. Burns alleged that, while living in a public housing block, he had been abused and harassed by his neighbor, Mr. Dye, because of his sexuality.

Arguments: Burns accused Dye of discriminatory behavior, including multiple accounts of verbal abuse, homophobic graffiti, and smearing faeces and urine by his front door. Dye acknowledged that he used the terms "faggot" and "poofter" in relation to Burns, but argued that they are part of popular vernacular as general terms of insult, rather than having a meaning exclusively related to homosexuality. The terms were likened to the use of "bastard", which previously referred to a person born outside of marriage, but has become a general insult.

Judgments: The Tribunal found that verbal abuse occurring in an open hallway constituted a form of public communication because other residents and guests could overhear it. However, it did not meet the required threshold for incitement because Dye was so visibly drunk that he did not "enjoy any position of respect or influence". The Tribunal found that Dye had drawn a large penis on Burns' front door with the words "fag lives here, faggots should die", which breached anti-vilification law because it was considered public communication, and met the requirement for incitement because it promoted killing homosexuals. The depositing of faeces and urine on Burns' doorstep did not constitute vilification because even if it constituted public communication, it was not directly linked to Burns' sexuality. The Tribunal ordered Dye to send an apology letter to Burns and pay him $1,000.

A minority Tribunal member, Antony Silvia, argued that all allegations had been proven and that Burns should have been awarded $15,000. Burns stated that the judgement was a bittersweet victory. He said:

I'm a good person, I'm a decent person, I want to make society a better place for people. I don't want people put in boxes, put on the mantelpiece and knocked off by those who have hatred in their hearts.

=== Burns v Radio 2UE Sydney Pty Ltd (2003-2004) ===
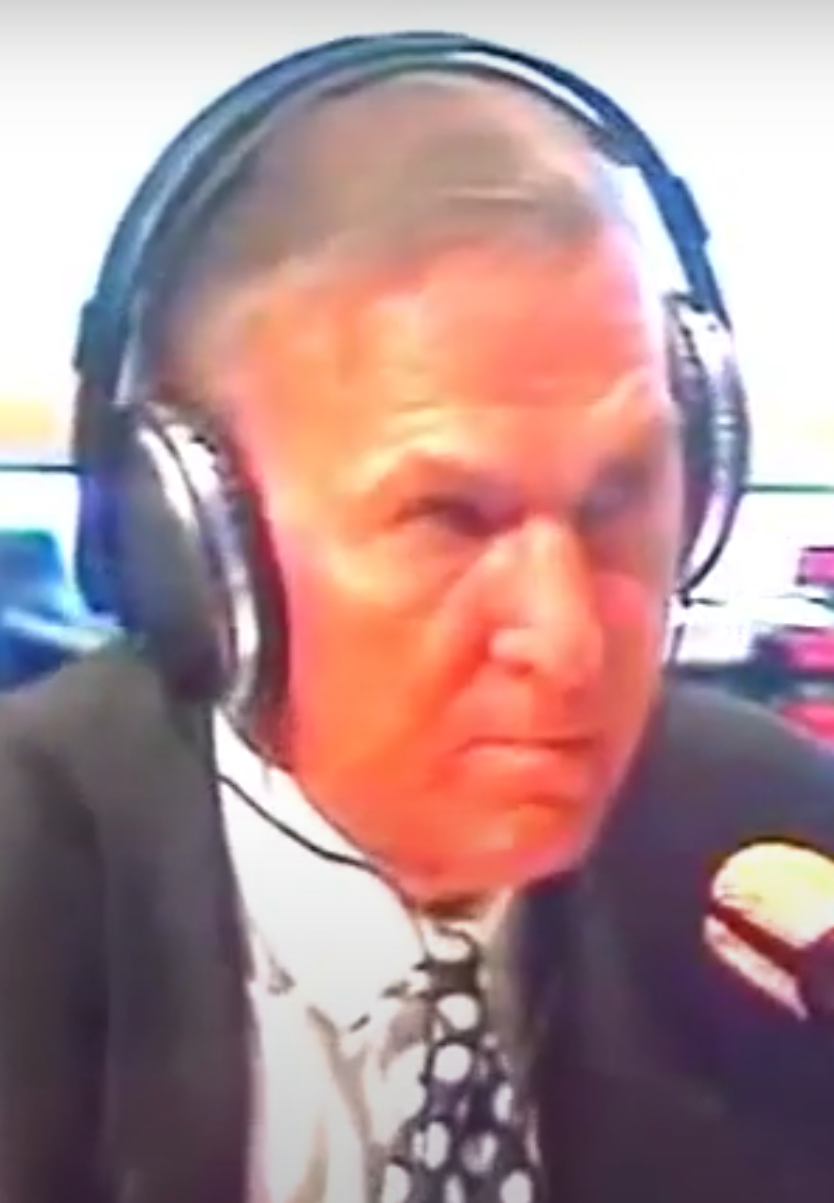
John Laws 1992

==== Burns v Radio 2UE Sydney Pty Ltd (No 1) ====
Background: On June 2, 2003, 2UE presenters John Laws and Steve Price referred to two gay contestants of the TV renovation show The Block as "poofs". They also complained that children could see the program. Burns stated that he was so angry upon hearing the program that he threw up. After the broadcast, he wrote a letter to Laws calling him a fascist, very unattractive, a right-wing reactional bigot, a creature of hate, and Adolf. Burns stated that he sought a public apology and a $10,000 donation to an HIV/AIDS charity.

Proceedings: During the proceedings, Burns requested $40,000 in damages and a written apology in the Sydney Star Observer, the Sydney Morning Herald, and The Australian. Burns was represented by the Public Interest Advocacy Centre.

Arguments: 2UE's lawyers tendered 43 pages of Sydney Star Observer articles, which contained the word "poof" in a non-offensive way. Burns stated that the word is still offensive when used by those outside the gay family. He also stated that comments like "all interior designers are gay" presented "macho simplistic attitudes".

Judgement: The tribunal found that the remarks did not constitute severe ridicule themselves, but that they could incite severe ridicule in others. Radio 2UE was ordered to make a public apology on air and in three metropolitan newspapers, and pay Burns reasonable costs on a party-party basis.

The judgment also stated that a personal apology is not sincere if it is ordered by a court, but distinguished between a personal apology and a court-ordered apology. It stated that while a court-ordered apology is not an apology as understood in moral or social terms, it functions as an acknowledgment of wrongdoing rather than a statement of genuinely held feelings. This reasoning has subsequently been adopted and applied in other cases.

==== Burns v Radio 2UE Sydney Pty Ltd (No 2) ====
Background: In November 2004, 2UE presenters John Laws called Queer Eye For the Straight Guy star Carson Kressley a "pillow biter" and "pompous little pansy prig". Laws said it was intended as tongue-in-cheek humor.

Judgement: The Tribunal unanimously agreed that Laws' comments incited severe ridicule against homosexual men, but that free speech provisions in the Anti-Discrimination Act protected Laws. A dissenting tribunal member, Ms Mooney, stated that the insulting tone and degree of harm the comments may cause was not reasonable, so she thought that Laws had not established a reasonable free speech defense.

Apology: Before the judgment, Laws apologised in a gay newspaper, Sydney Star Observer, for his comments. Burns described the apology as "limp-wristed". Laws also agreed to give airtime to the Lesbian and Gay Anti-Violence Project.

On the same day as Laws' apology, the Sydney Gay and Lesbian Mardi Gras office was vandalized with the words "pillow biters" and "pompous pansy prig" written in pink spray-paint. Considering the offices were newly established with no signage identifying the Mardi Gras tenancy, The Star Observer stated that a member could have come from the gay community to prove a point.

=== Channel Nine's Footy Show (2010) ===
Background: A mockumentary style segment appeared on Channel Nine's The Footy Show in which the show's star Matthew Johns had a brother 'Elton Johns', a reference to Elton John, who was gay. In one scene, the father took 'Elton Johns' back to the hospital, saying, "I want to return this, it's faulty".

Judgment: The Administrative Decisions Tribunal found the skit was tasteless, offensive, and unfortunate, but that it did not incite hatred or severe contempt or serious ridicule of homosexuality.

=== Burns v Corbett and Burns v Gaynor (2012) ===
Background: In 2012, the Katter's Australia Party candidate for the seat of Wannon, Tess Corbett, stated that she did not want "gays, lesbians or paedophiles working in my kindergarten" and stated that "pedophiles will be next in line to be recognised with rights similar to gays and lesbians. Queensland Senate candidate Bernard Gaynor endorsed Corbett's statements and was suspended from Katter's Australia Party for saying he would not allow gay teachers to educate his children. In a submission to the NSW inquiry into anti-discrimination laws, Gaynor claimed he had received 37 complaints against him by Burns between 2014 and 2020. Burns stated:

I'm like a vicious Rottweiler... I've got hold of his leg and I'm not letting go until the bones and blood are bare

Judgement: NSW Civil and Administrative Tribunal. found Corbett had vilified homosexuals with her comments. She was ordered to apologise in writing to Burns and publish an apology to the gay community in the Sydney Morning Herald, but did not comply.

Injunction: Burns started proceedings in the NSW Supreme Court to require Corbett to comply with the previous orders, but the court stated that the tribunal did not have the jurisdiction to deal with Corbett or Gaynor because they were not in New South Wales.

Appeal: The matter was appealed to the High Court of Australia. The Gaynor case was conjoined to the Corbett matter. The appeal raised significant constitutional issues concerning the jurisdiction of an NSW tribunal over interstate acts. The appeal was unanimously dismissed, the court finding that chapter three of the Constitution would be undermined if a state tribunal had jurisdiction over acts interstate.

Burns was ordered to pay costs of over $81,000. Burns requested an ex gratia payment from the NSW Government to cover the costs, but the request was refused. He subsequently set up a GoFundMe campaign to raise the money to pay the costs.

=== Katter's Australian Party Commercial (2012) ===
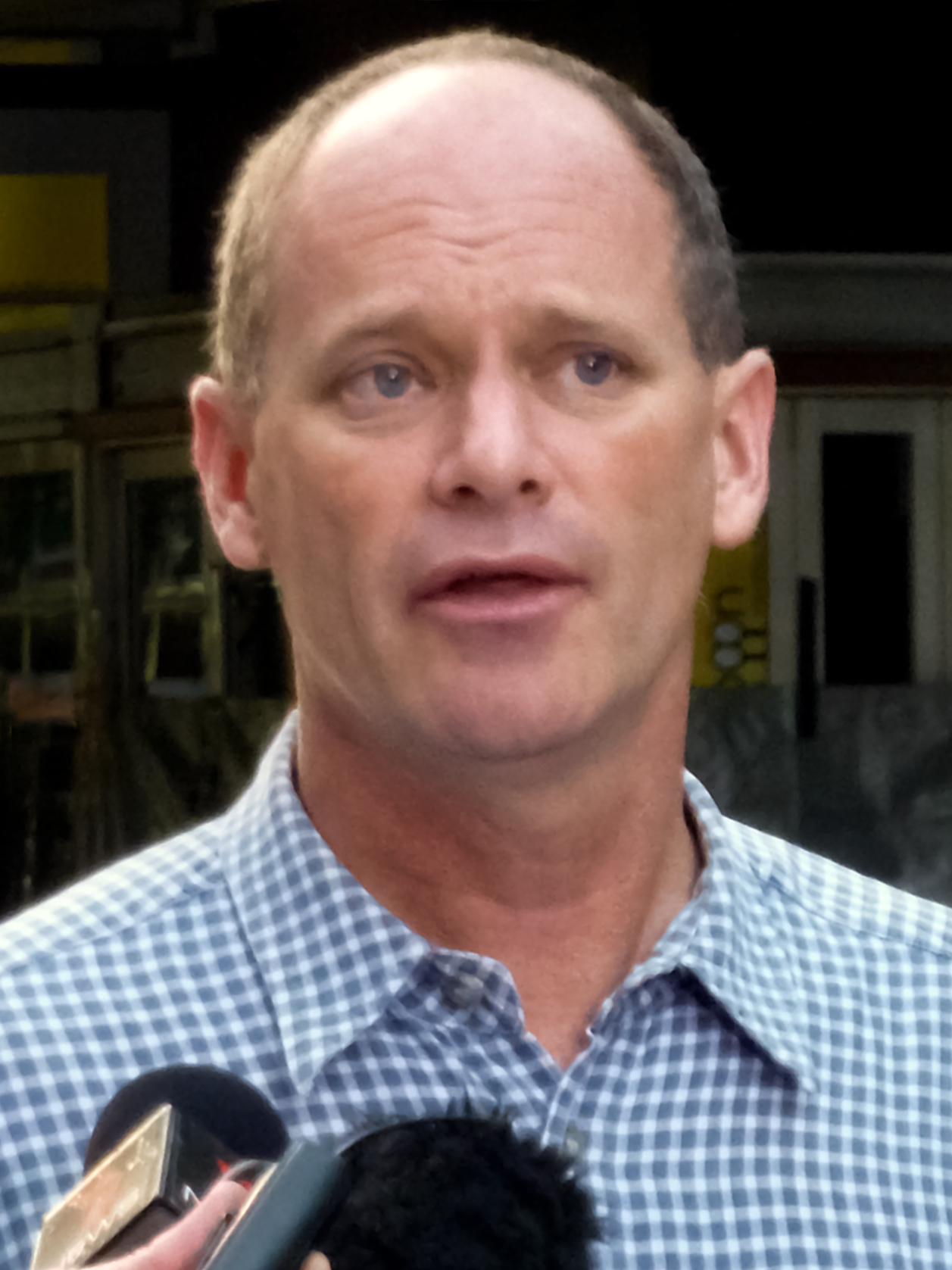
Campbell Newman being interviewed (cropped) b

In 2012, Burns said he lodged a complaint with the NSW Anti-Discrimination Board about a Katter's Australian Party commercial. The commercial highlighted Liberal National Party (LNP) leader Campbell Newman's personal views in support of gay marriage, despite his party's position against same-sex civil unions. The commercial showed Newman folding a skirt alongside images of an older shirtless man hugging and kissing a younger shirtless man. It caused outrage among the LGBTIQA+ community, with Healthy Community Queensland executive director Paul Marin describing Katter's party as a "hate group". Katter's brother, Carl Katter - who is openly gay - described it as "hatred and bigotry". Burns stated that the ad depicted homosexual people as being dirty and perverted.

=== Burns v Smith (2018) ===
Background: In April 2018, on a Facebook post by Bernard Gaynor, Blair Smith had commented that Garry Burns advocated for pedophile rights and pedophile inclusion in rainbow communities, and stated that Burns was a "filthy piece of human filth [that] needs to be put down, just like we do to sick animals". Burns reported Smiths' post to the NSW Police and contacted Smith to state that he would seek compensation and an offer to retract the comments. Smith then contacted Burns and threatened to smash his head in.

Arguments: Smith told the Anti-Discrimination Board of NSW that he had confused Gary Burns with another person called Garry and conceded that Burns had not advocated for pedophiles.

Judgment: Smith was ordered to pay $10,000 for homosexual vilification. The case confirmed that posting text on a public Facebook page that has an audience of people constitutes a "public act" in relation to the vilification law.

=== Burns v Folau (2019) ===
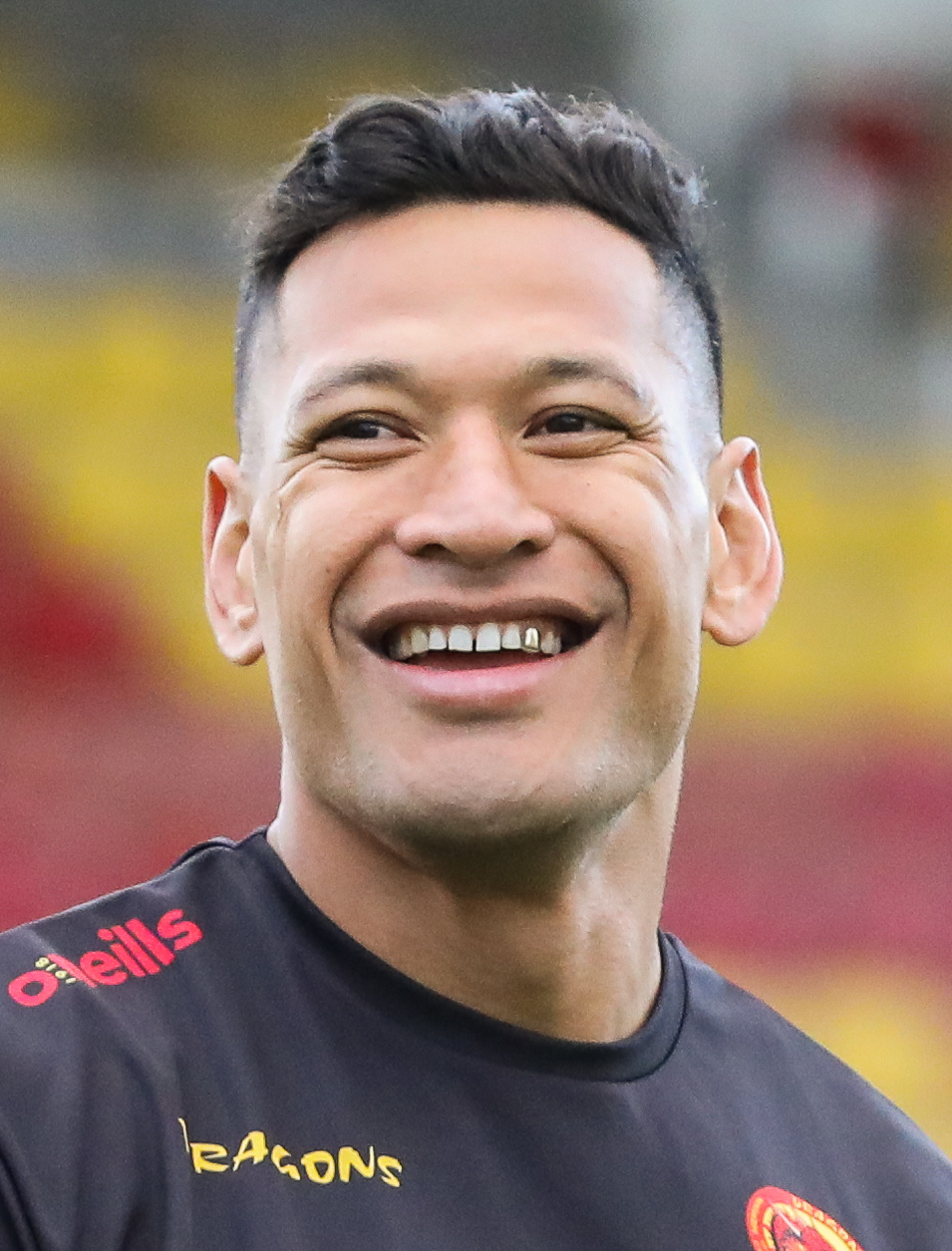
Israel Folau aux Dragons Catalans - 2020 (cropped)

Background: In 2019, Rugby player Israel Folau posted on Instagram, warning that "hell awaits homosexuals." He also made comments linking the recent Australian Bushfires to the legalization of same-sex marriage in 2017. Burns stated that Folau's statements on transgender and homosexual Australians could negatively impact teens who may suffer from low self-esteem.

Proceedings: Burns lodged a complaint with the NSW Anti-Discrimination Board relating to Folau's comments about homosexuals and transgender people. Burns had demanded an apology and a $100,000 donation to charity. The complaint was initially accepted, and Burns said in a statement that "Mr Folau is about to cop a dose of third-degree Burns".

Arguments: Burns argued that Folau had portrayed homosexuals as people who "should be shunned and/or avoided on the grounds of their homosexuality" and that the comments are "objectively capable of incitement of contempt and or hatred of homosexual persons. Folau argued that the complaint was "utterly hopeless". He referred to Burns' "continuous, inappropriate and threatening sending of emails", including 37 emails in one fortnight sent to Folau's lawyers. In one email, Burns stated: "Folau can hide behind his high-paid lawyers like some limp wrist pansy, but he will not dodge Mr Burns".

Judgment: Principal Member Anne Britton rejected Folau's argument that the complaint was "hopeless", but the complaint was declined for being vexatious. Board President Annabelle Bennet described it as a "flagrant abuse of process such that no further actions should be taken". She found that Burns had lodged the complaint to pressure Folau into settling, rather than using the processes afforded under the Anti-Discrimination Act. She also noted that Burns had disregarded the confidential nature of the proceedings by issuing a media release with the statement:

Fellas, I'm just like a vicious Alsatian dog. Once I grab hold of the leg, I don't let go until the bone is bare and bloodied. One way or another, I will get that remedy from Mr Folau.

== John Christopher Sunol ==
A blogger and taxi driver in Newcastle, John Christopher Sunol, had a history of homophobic and hateful speech. Sunol had previously made various online comments, including that the gay and feminist lobby were "anti-God" and that "faggots are all wicked evil people and God will burn Sydney to the Ground because of the evilness of these fags." A former University of Wollongong lecturer, Henry Collier, had lodged a complaint, and the NSW Civil and Administrative Tribunal found that five of Sunol's posts were generalizations of a highly insulting and offensive nature, constituting homosexual vilification. The case was the first time that an internet publication was tested to constitute a "public act" as defined in the vilification law. Sunol was ordered to refrain from commenting on the topics and ordered to pay Collier's costs.

Sunol had also previously been taken to the ACT Human Rights Commission by Ordo Templi Orientis follower David Bottrill. Sunol had described the religion as a "satanic pedophile cult" and described Botrill and other followers as pedophiles. ACT Civil and Administrative Tribunal described Sunol's comments as "archetypal hate speech" and ordered him to take down content from multiple websites that related to Bottrill. Sunol was also a respondent in a separate case of homosexual vilification.

Between 2012 and 2018, Burns lodged multiple complaints against Sunol for homosexual vilification. In 2012, Sunol was ordered to apologize publicly and pay Burns $4,500 as compensation for public comments, including that "gay marriage is wickedness". In 2014, Sunol was ordered to pay Burns $4,000 to burns after online comments accusing Burns of being a child sex abuser and "lying faggot". According to a friend of Sunol, by 2018, Burns had submitted 77 complaints against Sunol, leading to 24 tribunal or court matters and 29 days of hearings.
