= Albert Talipeau =

Niue & Samoa international rugby league footballer

Alby Talipeau
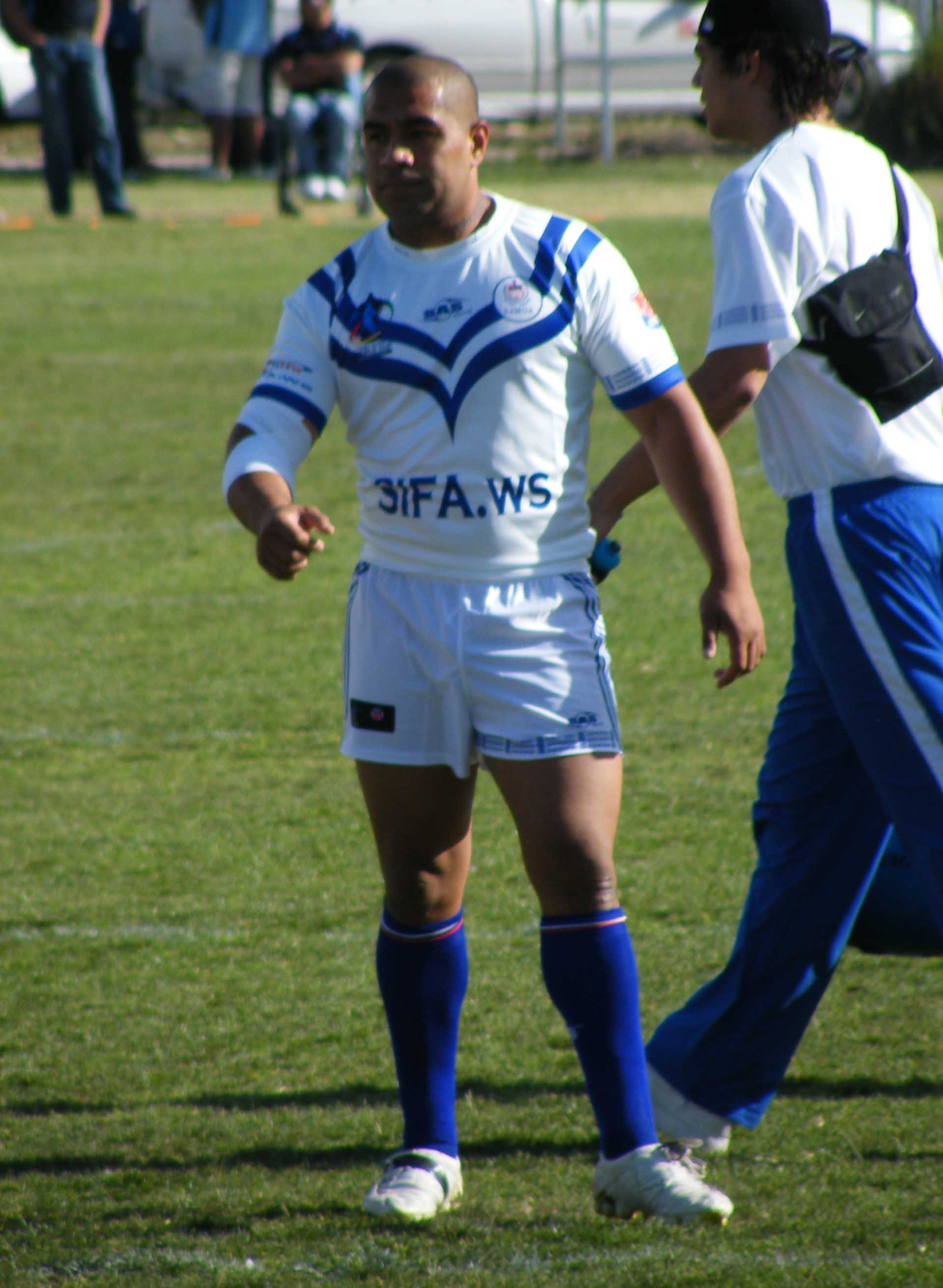

Personal information
- Full name: Albert Talipeau
- Born: 15 August 1981 (age 44)

Playing information
- Position: Hooker, Halfback
Club
Years	Team	Pld	T	G	FG	P
2000–02	Sydney Roosters	9	0	0	0	0
2004	Wakefield Trinity Wildcats	13	0	1	0	2
	Total	22	0	1	0	2
Representative
Years	Team	Pld	T	G	FG	P
2006–08	Samoa	5	0	0	0	0
2015	Niue
- Source: As of 11 August 2016

Albert "Alby" Talipeau (born 15 August 1981) is a rugby league footballer who plays as a hooker or halfback for the Eastern Suburbs Tigers in the Queensland Cup competition.

== Playing career ==
Talipeau has previously played for Cronulla De La Salle; in the National Rugby League for the Sydney Roosters; in the Queensland Cup for the Wynnum Manly Seagulls; and in the Super League for the Wakefield Trinity Wildcats.

Talipeau was awarded Man of the Match in the 2008 Queensland Cup Grand Final, when playing for the Souths Logan Magpies.

== Representative career ==
Talipeau is a Samoan international and played at the 2000 Rugby League World Cup.

He played in the 2008 Rugby League World Cup, and has been named in the squad for the 2009 Pacific Cup.

On 2 May 2015 he played for Niue in a match against South Africa.
