= 2000 Rugby League World Cup squads =

The 2000 Rugby League World Cup squads consisted of players from the national rugby league football teams of fifteen countries: Australia, England, Fiji, Russia, New Zealand, Wales, Lebanon, Cook Islands, Papua New Guinea, France, Tonga, South Africa, Ireland, Samoa and Scotland.

All teams were permitted to name a squad of up to 24 players.

== Australia ==
Australia named their squad on 28 August, and opted to select only 22 players out of a possible 24.

Head coach: (Australia) Chris Anderson

| Player | Games | Tries | Goals | Points | Position | Club |
|---|---|---|---|---|---|---|
| Brad Fittler (captain) | 5 | 4 | 0 | 16 | FE | Sydney Roosters |
| Trent Barrett | 4 | 4 | 0 | 16 | FE | St. George Illawarra Dragons |
| Darren Britt | 3 | 0 | 0 | 0 | PR | Canterbury-Bankstown Bulldogs |
| Jason Croker | 4 | 2 | 0 | 8 | SR | Canberra Raiders |
| Bryan Fletcher | 5 | 5 | 0 | 20 | SR | Sydney Roosters |
| Matthew Gidley | 6 | 4 | 0 | 16 | CE | Newcastle Knights |
| Ryan Girdler | 5 | 6 | 18 | 60 | CE | Penrith Panthers |
| Craig Gower | 3 | 1 | 0 | 4 | HB | Penrith Panthers |
| Scott Hill | 6 | 2 | 0 | 8 | FE | Melbourne Storm |
| Nathan Hindmarsh | 4 | 4 | 0 | 16 | SR | Parramatta Eels |
| Andrew Johns | 5 | 3 | 0 | 12 | HB | Newcastle Knights |
| Robbie Kearns | 6 | 0 | 0 | 0 | PR | Melbourne Storm |
| Ben Kennedy | 3 | 3 | 0 | 12 | LF | Newcastle Knights |
| Brett Kimmorley | 5 | 1 | 0 | 4 | HB | Melbourne Storm |
| Darren Lockyer | 5 | 3 | 4 | 20 | FB | Brisbane Broncos |
| Adam MacDougall | 6 | 5 | 0 | 20 | UB | Newcastle Knights |
| Mat Rogers | 4 | 4 | 27 | 70 | UB | Cronulla-Sutherland Sharks |
| Wendell Sailor | 5 | 10 | 0 | 40 | WG | Brisbane Broncos |
| Jason Stevens | 4 | 0 | 0 | 0 | PR | Cronulla-Sutherland Sharks |
| Gorden Tallis | 5 | 1 | 0 | 4 | SR | Brisbane Broncos |
| Michael Vella | 3 | 0 | 0 | 0 | SR | Parramatta Eels |
| Shane Webcke | 6 | 1 | 0 | 4 | PR | Brisbane Broncos |

== England ==
England named their squad on 18 September. Francis Cummins and Simon Haughton withdrew due to injury, and were replaced by Paul Wellens and Andy Hay.

Head coach: (England) John Kear

| Player | Games | Tries | Goals | Points | Position | Club |
|---|---|---|---|---|---|---|
| Andy Farrell (captain) | 5 | 1 | 21 | 46 | LF | Wigan Warriors |
| Paul Anderson | 4 | 0 | 0 | 0 | PR | Bradford Bulls |
| Paul Deacon | 4 | 1 | 0 | 4 | HB | Bradford Bulls |
| Stuart Fielden | 5 | 0 | 0 | 0 | PR | Bradford Bulls |
| Darren Fleary | 3 | 0 | 0 | 0 | FR | Leeds Rhinos |
| Mike Forshaw | 3 | 0 | 0 | 0 | LF | Bradford Bulls |
| Andy Hay | 3 | 2 | 0 | 8 | SR | Leeds Rhinos |
| Harvey Howard | 5 | 0 | 0 | 0 | PR | Brisbane Broncos |
| Sean Long | 5 | 2 | 5 | 18 | HB | St. Helens |
| Nathan McAvoy | 0 | 0 | 0 | 0 | WG | Bradford Bulls |
| Adrian Morley | 2 | 0 | 0 | 0 | PR | Leeds Rhinos |
| Scott Naylor | 4 | 1 | 0 | 4 | CE | Bradford Bulls |
| Jamie Peacock | 4 | 6 | 0 | 24 | PR | Bradford Bulls |
| Leon Pryce | 2 | 1 | 0 | 4 | SO | Bradford Bulls |
| Kris Radlinski | 4 | 1 | 0 | 4 | FB | Wigan Warriors |
| Darren Rogers | 3 | 2 | 0 | 8 | WG | Castleford Tigers |
| Paul Rowley | 3 | 2 | 0 | 8 | HK | Halifax Blue Sox |
| Paul Sculthorpe | 1 | 0 | 0 | 0 | LF | St. Helens |
| Keith Senior | 4 | 1 | 0 | 4 | CE | Leeds Rhinos |
| Kevin Sinfield | 3 | 3 | 0 | 12 | LK | Leeds Rhinos |
| Tony Smith | 4 | 3 | 0 | 12 | HB | Wigan Warriors |
| Stuart Spruce | 2 | 0 | 0 | 0 | FB | Bradford Bulls |
| Francis Stephenson | 2 | 1 | 0 | 4 | FR | Wakefield Trinity Wildcats |
| Chev Walker | 5 | 2 | 0 | 8 | SR | Leeds Rhinos |
| Paul Wellens | 5 | 2 | 0 | 8 | FB | St. Helens |

== Fiji ==
Head coach: (Australia) Don Furner

| Player | Games | Tries | Goals | Points | Position | Club |
|---|---|---|---|---|---|---|
| Lote Tuqiri (captain) | 3 | 4 | 5 | 26 | WG | Brisbane Broncos |
| Jimi Bolakoro | 1 | 0 | 0 | 0 | PR | Unattached |
| Tabua Cakacaka | 3 | 1 | 0 | 4 | PR | Canberra Raiders |
| Jone Kuraduadua | 2 | 1 | 0 | 4 | WG | Bellingen |
| Josefa Lasagavibau | 2 | 0 | 0 | 0 | SR | Nadera |
| Samuela Marayawa | 2 | 0 | 0 | 0 | SR | Unattached |
| Roger Matakamikamica | 1 | 0 | 0 | 0 | HK | Unattached |
| Kaleveti Naisoro | 1 | 0 | 0 | 0 | HB | Unattached |
| Eparama Navale | 3 | 1 | 0 | 4 | CE | Northern Eagles |
| Mesake Navugona | 1 | 0 | 0 | 0 | UB | Unattached |
| Setariki Rakabula | 1 | 0 | 0 | 0 | CE | Unattached |
| Freddie Robarts | 3 | 0 | 0 | 0 | LF | Te Atatu Roosters |
| Stephen Smith | 2 | 0 | 0 | 0 | HB | Te Atatu Roosters |
| Waisale Sovatabua | 3 | 1 | 0 | 4 | WG | Huddersfield Giants |
| Semi Tadulala | 2 | 0 | 0 | 0 | WG | Brisbane West |
| Amani Takayawa | 2 | 0 | 0 | 0 | FE | Unattached |
| Joe Tamani | 2 | 0 | 0 | 0 | SR | Cabramatta Two Blues |
| Farasiko Tokarei | 3 | 0 | 0 | 0 | WG | Tumbarumba |
| Kalaveti Tuiyabayaba | 2 | 0 | 0 | 0 | LF | Bounty |
| Niko Vakarawa | 1 | 0 | 0 | 0 | WG | Lismore |
| Etuate Vakatawa | 3 | 0 | 0 | 0 | SR | Tumbarumba |
| Samu Valelala | 1 | 0 | 0 | 0 | FR | Unattached |
| Atunasia Vunivalu | 3 | 3 | 1 | 14 | LF | Sarua |
| Peceli Vuniyayawa | 2 | 0 | 0 | 0 | LF | Queenbayen |
| Peceli Wawavanua | 2 | 0 | 0 | 0 | HK | Unattached |

== Russia ==
Head coach: (Russia) Evgeniy Klebanov

| Player | Games | Tries | Goals | Points | Position | Club |
|---|---|---|---|---|---|---|
| Ian Rubin (captain) | 3 | 0 | 0 | 0 | PR | Sydney Roosters |
| Viatcheslav Artashin | 1 | 0 | 0 | 0 | FE | Kazan Arrows |
| Robert Campbell | 3 | 0 | 0 | 0 | PR | Redcliffe Dolphins |
| Rinat Shamsutdinov | 1 | 0 | 0 | 0 | WG | Kazan Arrows |
| Craig Cygler | 2 | 0 | 0 | 0 | CE | Cairns Brothers |
| Matthew Donovan | 2 | 1 | 0 | 4 | CE | Western Tigers |
| Andrey Dumalkin | 2 | 0 | 0 | 0 | CE | RC Lokomotiv Moscow |
| Aaron Findlay | 2 | 0 | 0 | 0 | SR | Canterbury Bulldogs |
| Rustem Garifullin | 1 | 0 | 0 | 0 | SR | Kazan Arrows |
| Kirill Kulemin | 1 | 0 | 0 | 0 | SR | Moscow Magicians |
| Igor Gavrilin | 3 | 0 | 0 | 0 | HB | RC Lokomotiv Moscow |
| Michael Giorgas | 1 | 0 | 0 | 0 | SR | Logan City |
| Robert Ilyasov | 3 | 1 | 0 | 0 | FB | Kazan Arrows |
| Igor Zhiltsov | 2 | 0 | 1 | 2 | LK | RC Lokomotiv Moscow |
| Pavel Kalashkin | 3 | 0 | 0 | 0 | LF | Kazan Arrows |
| Andrei Kuchumov | 1 | 0 | 0 | 0 | HB | Moscow Magicians |
| Alexandr Lysenkov | 1 | 0 | 0 | 0 | HK | RC Lokomotiv Moscow |
| Mikhail Mitrofanov | 3 | 0 | 3 | 6 | WG | Kazan Arrows |
| Viktor Nechaev | 2 | 0 | 0 | 0 | FE | RC Lokomotiv Moscow |
| Andrei Olari | 3 | 0 | 0 | 0 | FE | Toulouse Spacers |
| Vadim Postnikov | 2 | 0 | 0 | 0 | PR | RC Lokomotiv Moscow |
| Maxim Romanov | 3 | 0 | 0 | 0 | WG | Kazan Arrows |
| Joel Rullis | 3 | 1 | 0 | 4 | LK | Western Tigers |
| Petr Sokolov | 3 | 0 | 0 | 0 | SR | RC Lokomotiv Moscow |

== New Zealand ==
New Zealand named a 23-man squad on 17 August.

Head coach: (New Zealand) Frank Endacott

| Player | Games | Tries | Goals | Points | Position | Club |
|---|---|---|---|---|---|---|
| Richie Barnett (captain) | 6 | 6 | 0 | 24 | FE | Sydney Roosters |
| Richie Blackmore | 2 | 1 | 0 | 4 | CE | Leeds Rhinos |
| Tonie Carroll | 5 | 4 | 0 | 16 | CE | Brisbane Broncos |
| Nathan Cayless | 6 | 1 | 0 | 4 | PR | Parramatta Eels |
| Brian Jellick | 2 | 2 | 0 | 8 | WG | North Queensland Cowboys |
| Stacey Jones | 5 | 2 | 6 | 20 | HB | Auckland Warriors |
| Stephen Kearney | 6 | 2 | 0 | 8 | SR | Melbourne Storm |
| Ali Lauitiiti | 2 | 2 | 0 | 8 | SR | Auckland Warriors |
| Tasesa Lavea | 2 | 2 | 14 | 36 | HB | Melbourne Storm |
| Henry Paul | 5 | 1 | 25* | 53 | HB | Bradford Bulls |
| Robbie Paul | 5 | 5 | 0 | 20 | HB | Bradford Bulls |
| Quentin Pongia | 5 | 2 | 0 | 8 | PR | Sydney Roosters |
| Tony Puletua | 2 | 1 | 0 | 4 | SR | Penrith Panthers |
| Matt Rua | 5 | 1 | 0 | 4 | SR | Melbourne Storm |
| Craig Smith | 6 | 1 | 0 | 4 | PR | St. George Illawarra Dragons |
| Richard Swain | 6 | 0 | 0 | 0 | HK | Melbourne Storm |
| Logan Swann | 4 | 2 | 0 | 8 | SR | Auckland Warriors |
| Willie Talau | 5 | 6 | 0 | 24 | CE | Canterbury Bulldogs |
| David Vaealiki | 1 | 2 | 0 | 8 | CE | Parramatta Eels |
| Joe Vagana | 6 | 0 | 0 | 0 | PR | Auckland Warriors |
| Nigel Vagana | 5 | 3 | 0 | 12 | CE | Auckland Warriors |
| Lesley Vainikolo | 5 | 9 | 0 | 36 | WG | Canberra Raiders |
| Ruben Wiki | 6 | 3 | 0 | 12 | PR | Canberra Raiders |

- Note*: one of the goals was a field goal.

== Wales ==
Head coach: (Wales) Clive Griffiths

| Player | Games | Tries | Goals | Points | Position | Club |
|---|---|---|---|---|---|---|
| Iestyn Harris (captain) | 5 | 2 | 21 | 50 | HB | Leeds Rhinos |
| Paul Atcheson | 5 | 1 | 0 | 4 | FB | St. Helens |
| Lee Briers | 5 | 4 | 2* | 18 | SO | Warrington Wolves |
| Dean Busby | 3 | 0 | 0 | 0 | LF | Warrington Wolves |
| Garreth Carvell | 2 | 0 | 0 | 0 | PR | Leeds Rhinos |
| Jason Critchley | 5 | 1 | 0 | 4 | CE | Wakefield Trinity Wildcats |
| Keiron Cunningham | 5 | 1 | 0 | 4 | HK | St. Helens |
| Wes Davies | 5 | 2 | 0 | 8 | FB | Wigan Warriors |
| John Devereux | 2 | 0 | 0 | 0 | CE | Bridgend |
| Barry Eaton | 1 | 0 | 0 | 0 | SH | Castleford Tigers |
| Anthony Farrell | 5 | 1 | 0 | 4 | FR | Leeds Rhinos |
| Paul Highton | 5 | 0 | 0 | 0 | PR | Salford City Reds |
| Mick Jenkins | 4 | 1 | 0 | 4 | BR | Hull FC |
| David Luckwell | 1 | 0 | 0 | 0 | UF | Hull Kingston Rovers |
| Paul Moriarty | 2 | 0 | 0 | 0 | PR | Swansea |
| Justin Morgan | 5 | 0 | 0 | 0 | SR | Canberra Raiders |
| Chris Morley | 4 | 0 | 0 | 0 | LK | Salford City Reds |
| Hefin O'Hare | 1 | 0 | 0 | 0 | CE | Huddersfield Giants |
| Chris Smith | 2 | 0 | 0 | 0 | WG | St. Helens |
| Paul Sterling | 4 | 1 | 0 | 4 | WG | Leeds Rhinos |
| Anthony Sullivan | 5 | 0 | 0 | 0 | WG | St. Helens |
| Kris Tassell | 4 | 4 | 0 | 16 | CE | Salford City Reds |
| Ian Watson | 3 | 1 | 0 | 4 | HK | Swinton Lions |
| Dave Whittle | 3 | 0 | 0 | 0 | FR | Warrington Wolves |

- Note*: Both goals were field goals.

== Lebanon ==
Head coach: (Lebanon) (Australia) John Elias

| Player | Games | Tries | Goals | Points | Position | Club |
|---|---|---|---|---|---|---|
| Darren Maroon (captain) | 3 | 0 | 0 | 0 | FR | Sydney Bulls |
| Mohammed Abbas | 2 | 0 | 0 | 0 | WG | Sydney Bulls |
| Mohamed Chahal | 1 | 0 | 0 | 0 | FB | Sydney Bulls |
| Sami Chamoun | 3 | 0 | 0 | 0 | FR | Sydney Bulls |
| Michael Coorey | 2 | 1 | 0 | 4 | UB | Balmain Tigers |
| Ray Daher | 2 | 0 | 0 | 0 | LK | Cabramatta |
| Hazem El Masri | 3 | 3 | 6 | 24 | FB | Canterbury Bulldogs |
| Samer El Masri | 3 | 0 | 0 | 0 | HB | Sydney Roosters |
| Monah Elahmad | 2 | 0 | 0 | 0 | FR | Cabramatta |
| Fady Elchad | 1 | 0 | 0 | 0 | FE | Sydney Bulls |
| Eben Goddard | 1 | 0 | 0 | 0 | BR | St. George-Illawarra Dragons |
| George Katrib | 2 | 0 | 0 | 0 | CE | Sydney Bulls |
| Paul Khoury | 3 | 0 | 0 | 0 | UT | Canterbury Bulldogs |
| Joe Lichaa | 0 | 0 | 0 | 0 | LK | Sydney Roosters |
| Bilal Najarrin | 1 | 0 | 0 | 0 | WG | St George-Illawarra Dragons |
| Charles Baynie | 0 | 0 | 0 | 0 | SR | Sydney Bulls |
| Hassan Saleh | 3 | 3 | 0 | 12 | CE | Canterbury Bulldogs |
| Nedol Saleh | 1 | 0 | 0 | 0 | HK | Western Suburbs Magpies |
| Chris Salem | 3 | 0 | 0 | 0 | SR | Sydney Bulls |
| Anthony Semrani | 2 | 0 | 0 | 0 | HK | Canterbury Bulldogs |
| Jason Stanton | 2 | 0 | 0 | 0 | FE | Sydney Bulls |
| Kandy Tamer | 3 | 0 | 0 | 0 | BR | Sydney Roosters |
| Travis Touma | 3 | 1 | 0 | 4 | WG | Sydney Bulls |

== Cook Islands ==
Head coach: (New Zealand) Stan Martin

| Player | Games | Tries | Goals | Points | Position | Club |
|---|---|---|---|---|---|---|
| Kevin Iro (captain) | 3 | 1 | 0 | 4 | CE | St. Helens |
| Michael Andersson | 3 | 0 | 0 | 0 | HB | Unattached |
| Steve Berryman | 2 | 2 | 2 | 12 | LK | Unattached |
| Craig Bowen | 3 | 0 | 0 | 0 | FE | Adelaide Rams |
| Zane Clark | 3 | 0 | 0 | 0 | HK | Unknown |
| Adam Cook | 2 | 0 | 0 | 0 | UT | Unattached |
| Tere Glassie | 2 | 0 | 0 | 0 | BR | South Sydney Rabbitohs |
| Leroy Joe | 3 | 1 | 0 | 4 | HB | Hull Kingston Rovers |
| Vaine Kino | 1 | 0 | 0 | 0 | SR | Unattached |
| Patrick Kuru | 2 | 0 | 0 | 0 | BR | Unattached |
| Peter Lewis | 3 | 0 | 0 | 0 | CE | Auckland Warriors |
| Meti Noovao | 1 | 1 | 0 | 4 | LK | Burleigh Bears |
| Tyrone Pau | 2 | 0 | 0 | 0 | BR | Unattached |
| Jason Pekepo | 0 | 0 | 0 | 0 | HK/PR | Lancashire Lynx |
| Richard Piakura | 3 | 0 | 3 | 6 | FB | Unattached |
| Raymond Ruaporo | 1 | 0 | 0 | 0 | SR | Unattached |
| Anthony Samuel | 3 | 0 | 0 | 0 | BR | Unattached |
| Sonny Shepherd | 2 | 0 | 0 | 0 | SR | Unattached |
| Karl Temata | 3 | 1 | 0 | 4 | WG | Hibiscus Coast Raiders |
| Jason Temu | 3 | 0 | 0 | 0 | FR | Newcastle Knights |
| Tiri Toa | 1 | 1 | 0 | 4 | WG | Unattached |
| Tangia Tongiia | 2 | 0 | 0 | 0 | WG | Unattached |
| George Tuakura | 3 | 0 | 0 | 0 | FR | Otahuhu Leopards |
| Tai Walter | 0 | 0 | 0 | 0 | | |

== Papua New Guinea ==
Head coach: (Australia) Bob Bennett

| Player | Games | Tries | Goals | Points | Position | Club |
|---|---|---|---|---|---|---|
| Adrian Lam (captain) | 4 | 1 | 1* | 5 | HB | Sydney Roosters |
| Eddie Aila | 4 | 1 | 0 | 4 | CE | Wynnum Manly Seagulls |
| Makali Aizue | 3 | 0 | 0 | 0 | PR | Lae Bombers |
| Marcus Bai | 4 | 1 | 0 | 4 | WG | Melbourne Storm |
| David Buko | 4 | 2 | 1 | 10 | FB | Western Suburbs Magpies |
| Stanley Gene | 4 | 2 | 0 | 8 | FE | Hull FC |
| Augustine Justine | 0 | 0 | 0 | 0 | BR | Lae Bombers |
| Raymond Kahl | 2 | 1 | 0 | 4 | FR | Enga Mioks |
| Alex Krewanty | 4 | 1 | 0 | 4 | BR | Port Moresby Vipers |
| Bruce Mamando | 4 | 0 | 0 | 0 | BR | North Queensland Cowboys |
| Michael Marum | 1 | 0 | 0 | 0 | HK | Rabaul Gurias |
| Mark Mom | 4 | 0 | 0 | 0 | HK | Unattached |
| Michael Mondo | 4 | 1 | 0 | 4 | FR | Yamco-Wamoon Hawks |
| Duncan Na'awi | 4 | 0 | 0 | 0 | FR | Redcliffe Dolphins |
| Andrew Norman | 4 | 0 | 0 | 0 | LF | Unattached |
| Tom O'Reilly | 4 | 0 | 0 | 0 | LK | Warrington Wolves |
| Elias Paiyo | 3 | 1 | 0 | 4 | HK | Adelaide Rams |
| Lucas Solbat | 3 | 1 | 0 | 4 | PR | Oldham |
| Alfred Songoro | 4 | 0 | 0 | 0 | CE | Wakefield Trinity Wildcats |
| John Wilshere | 4 | 2 | 11 | 30 | WG | Melbourne Storm |

* Field Goal

== France ==
Head coach: (France) Gilles Dumas

| Player | Games | Tries | Goals | Points | Position | Club |
|---|---|---|---|---|---|---|
| Fabien Devecchi (captain) | 4 | 0 | 0 | 0 | FE | Unattached |
| Fourcade Abasse | 0 | 0 | 0 | 0 | WG | Unattached |
| Frédéric Banquet | 3 | 2 | 16 | 40 | FB | Wakefield Trinity Wildcats |
| Patrice Benausse | 1 | 1 | 0 | 4 | WG | Unattached |
| Jean-Christophe Borlin | 0 | 0 | 0 | 0 | FR | Unattached |
| Laurent Carrasco | 0 | 0 | 0 | 0 | LK | Unattached |
| Jean-Emmanuel Cassin | 4 | 2 | 0 | 8 | CE | Toulouse Olympique |
| Aurélien Cologni | 0 | 0 | 0 | 0 | LK | Unattached |
| Yacine Dekkiche | 1 | 1 | 0 | 4 | WG | Huddersfield Giants |
| David Despin | 4 | 0 | 0 | 0 | CE | Unattached |
| Arnaud Dulac | 4 | 1 | 0 | 4 | CE | Unattached |
| Abderazak El Khalouki | 1 | 0 | 0 | 0 | BR | Unattached |
| Laurent Frayssinous | 1 | 0 | 0 | 0 | FE | Unattached |
| Jean-Marc Garcia | 3 | 1 | 0 | 4 | WG | Wakefield Trinity Wildcats |
| Jérôme Guisset | 4 | 1 | 0 | 4 | SR | Warrington Wolves |
| Rachid Hechiche | 4 | 2 | 0 | 8 | FR | Unattached |
| Pascal Jampy | 4 | 4 | 0 | 16 | LK | Unattached |
| Julien Rinaldi | 3 | 1 | 0 | 4 | HB | Wakefield Trinity Wildcats |
| Claude Sirvent | 3 | 3 | 0 | 12 | WG | Unattached |
| Romain Sort | 3 | 0 | 0 | 0 | UT | Unattached |
| Gael Tallec | 4 | 1 | 0 | 4 | SR | Halifax Blue Sox |
| Frédéric Teixido | 4 | 0 | 0 | 0 | FR | Sheffield Eagles |
| Vincent Wulf | 4 | 0 | 0 | 0 | HK | Unattached |

== Tonga ==
Head coach: (Australia) Murray Hurst

| Player | Games | Tries | Goals | Points | Position | Club |
|---|---|---|---|---|---|---|
| Martin Masella (captain) | 3 | 1 | 0 | 4 | FR | Wakefield Trinity Wildcats |
| Paul Fisiiahi | 1 | 1 | 0 | 4 | CE | Eastern Tornadoes |
| David Fisiiahi | 1 | 1 | 0 | 4 | CE | Eastern Tornadoes |
| Nuko Hifo | 1 | 0 | 0 | 0 | FB | Griffith University |
| Phil Howlett | 3 | 0 | 0 | 0 | FE | Bradford Bulls |
| Lipina Kaufusi | 3 | 1 | 0 | 4 | WG | Western Suburbs Magpies |
| Malupo Kaufusi | 1 | 0 | 0 | 0 | BR | Northern Eagles |
| Brent Kite | 2 | 0 | 0 | 0 | SR | Canberra Raiders |
| Paul Koloi | 3 | 0 | 0 | 0 | FB | Mackay Sea Eagles |
| Talite Liava'a | 2 | 1 | 0 | 4 | PR | Auckland Warriors |
| Nelson Lomi | 3 | 1 | 0 | 4 | FR | Sydney Roosters |
| Andrew Lomu | 2 | 0 | 0 | 0 | BR | Sydney Roosters |
| Duane Mann | 3 | 2 | 1 | 10 | LK | Unknown |
| Esau Mann | 3 | 1 | 0 | 4 | BR | Otahuhu Leopards |
| Willie Manu | 3 | 0 | 0 | 0 | LK | Wests Tigers |
| Willie Mason | 3 | 2 | 0 | 8 | SR | Canterbury Bulldogs |
| Alfons Masella | 2 | 0 | 0 | 0 | FR | St George Illawarra Dragons |
| Fifita Moala | 3 | 3 | 9 | 30 | WG | Melbourne Storm |
| Tevita Vaikona | 3 | 4 | 0 | 16 | CE | Bradford Bulls |
| Greg Wolfgramm | 2 | 0 | 0 | 0 | CE | Canberra Raiders |
| Willie Wolfgramm | 2 | 1 | 0 | 4 | HB | Queanbeyan Kangaroos |

== South Africa ==
Head coach: (New Zealand) Paul Matete

| Player | Games | Tries | Goals | Points | Position | Club |
|---|---|---|---|---|---|---|
| Jamie Bloem (captain) | 3 | 0 | 3 | 6 | HB | Halifax Blue Sox |
| Leon Barnard | 3 | 1 | 0 | 4 | CE | Unattached |
| Brian Best | 3 | 1 | 0 | 4 | FB | Unattached |
| Jaco Booysen | 3 | 0 | 0 | 0 | FR | Unattached |
| Coenraad Breytenbach | 1 | 1 | 0 | 4 | FE | Unattached |
| Francois Cloete | 2 | 0 | 0 | 0 | HK | Unattached |
| Archer Dames | 3 | 0 | 0 | 0 | WG | Unattached |
| Quinton De Villiers | 3 | 1 | 0 | 4 | BR | Unattached |
| Hercules Erasmus | 3 | 0 | 0 | 0 | LK | Unattached |
| Chris Hurter | 2 | 0 | 0 | 0 | HK | Unattached |
| Justin Jennings | 3 | 0 | 0 | 0 | HK | Unattached |
| Mark Johnson | 3 | 0 | 0 | 0 | CE | Salford City Reds |
| Richard Louw | 1 | 0 | 0 | 0 | LK | Unattached |
| Dikkie Mulder | 1 | 0 | 0 | 0 | LK | Unattached |
| Hendrik Mulder | 3 | 0 | 0 | 0 | FR | Unattached |
| Corne Nel | 3 | 0 | 0 | 0 | FR | Unattached |
| Ian Noble | 2 | 0 | 0 | 0 | WG | Unattached |
| Tim O'Shea | 1 | 0 | 1 | 2 | FB | Unattached |
| Eugene Powell | 3 | 0 | 0 | 0 | FR | Unattached |
| Sean Rutgerson | 3 | 0 | 0 | 0 | SR | Canberra Raiders |
| Sean Skelton | 3 | 0 | 0 | 0 | HK | St. George Illawarra Dragons |
| Pierre Van Wyke | 2 | 0 | 0 | 0 | FE | Unattached |
| Jaco Webb | 1 | 0 | 0 | 0 | SR | Unattached |

== Ireland ==
Head coach: (Ireland) Ralph Rimmer

| Player | Games | Tries | Goals | Points | Position | Club |
|---|---|---|---|---|---|---|
| Terry O'Connor (captain) | 4 | 0 | 0 | 0 | FR | Wigan Warriors |
| David Barnhill | 4 | 1 | 0 | 4 | SR | Leeds Rhinos |
| David Bradbury | 1 | 0 | 0 | 0 | PR | Huddersfield Giants |
| Liam Bretherton | 2 | 0 | 0 | 0 | SR | Wigan Warriors |
| Kevin Campion | 4 | 0 | 0 | 0 | BR | Brisbane Broncos |
| Brian Carney | 4 | 2 | 0 | 8 | WG | Hull |
| Martin Crompton | 1 | 1 | 0 | 4 | HB | Salford City Reds |
| Michael Eagar | 3 | 1 | 0 | 4 | CE | Castleford Tigers |
| Mark Forster | 3 | 1 | 0 | 4 | WG | Warrington Wolves |
| Ian Herron | 1 | 0 | 0 | 0 | WG | Hull |
| Chris Joynt | 4 | 1 | 0 | 4 | SR | St. Helens |
| Johnny Lawless | 3 | 0 | 0 | 0 | HK | Huddersfield Giants |
| Tommy Martyn | 3 | 1 | 0 | 4 | CE | St. Helens |
| Jamie Mathiou | 2 | 0 | 0 | 0 | FR | Leeds Rhinos |
| Barrie McDermott | 4 | 0 | 0 | 0 | FR | Leeds Rhinos |
| Steve Prescott | 4 | 1 | 17 | 38 | FB | Wakefield Trinity Wildcats |
| Luke Ricketson | 4 | 1 | 0 | 4 | LK | Sydney Roosters |
| Ryan Sheridan | 4 | 2 | 0 | 8 | HB | Leeds Rhinos |
| Paul Southern | 3 | 0 | 0 | 0 | FR | Salford City Reds |
| Liam Tallon | 1 | 0 | 0 | 0 | CE | Brisbane Norths |
| Danny Williams | 4 | 0 | 0 | 0 | HK | Melbourne Storm |
| Michael Withers | 4 | 3 | 0 | 12 | FE | Bradford Bulls |

- Gary Connolly and Anthony Stewart were originally named in the 24-man squad but withdrew due to injury. They were replaced by Liam Tallon and Martin Crompton.

== Samoa ==
Head coach: (New Zealand) Darrell Williams

| Player | Games | Tries | Goals | Points | Position | Club |
|---|---|---|---|---|---|---|
| Willie Poching (captain) | 4 | 0 | 2 | 4 | LK | Wakefield Trinity Wildcats |
| Monty Betham | 4 | 1 | 0 | 4 | HK | Auckland Warriors |
| Henry Fa'afili | 4 | 2 | 0 | 8 | FE | Auckland Warriors |
| Max Fala | 3 | 0 | 0 | 0 | LF | Unattached |
| Joe Galuvao | 2 | 0 | 0 | 0 | CE | Auckland Warriors |
| Simon Geros | 2 | 0 | 2 | 4 | FE | Burleigh Bears |
| Vae Kololo | 1 | 0 | 0 | 0 | LF | Auckland Warriors |
| Shane Laloata | 2 | 3 | 0 | 6 | CE | St. George Illawarra Dragons |
| Mark Leafa | 4 | 0 | 0 | 0 | BR | Sydney Roosters |
| Brian Leauma | 4 | 4 | 0 | 16 | WG | Penrith Panthers |
| Phillip Leuluai | 3 | 0 | 0 | 0 | PR | Otahuhu Leopards |
| Peter Lima | 2 | 0 | 0 | 0 | | |
| Jamahl Lolesi | 0 | 0 | 0 | 0 | WG | Canberra Raiders |
| Francis Meli | 3 | 0 | 0 | 0 | WG | Auckland Warriors |
| Laloa Milford | 4 | 3 | 0 | 12 | FB | Wests Tigers |
| Fred Petersen | 1 | 0 | 0 | 0 | BR | Penrith Panthers |
| Frank Puletua | 4 | 0 | 0 | 0 | FR | Penrith Panthers |
| Jerry Seuseu | 4 | 0 | 0 | 0 | FR | Auckland Warriors |
| David Solomona | 4 | 2 | 0 | 8 | SR | Sydney Roosters |
| Anthony Swann | 4 | 0 | 0 | 0 | CE | Canberra Raiders |
| Willie Swann | 4 | 1 | 1* | 5 | HB | Leigh Centurions |
| Albert Talipeau | 1 | 0 | 0 | 0 | HB | Sydney Roosters |
| Tony Tatupu | 4 | 0 | 0 | 0 | SR | Wakefield Trinity Wildcats |

- Note: field goal.

== Aotearoa Māori ==
Head coach: (New Zealand) Cameron Bell

| Player | Games | Tries | Goals | Points | Position | Club |
|---|---|---|---|---|---|---|
| Tawera Nikau (captain) | 3 | 0 | 0 | 0 | LK | Warrington Wolves |
| Jamie Cookthcote | 1 | 0 | 0 | 0 | HK | Unattached |
| Luke Goodwin | 1 | 0 | 2 | 4 | FE | London Harlequins |
| Terry Hermansson | 3 | 0 | 0 | 0 | FR | Auckland Warriors |
| Sean Hoppe | 2 | 0 | 0 | 0 | WG | St. Helens |
| David Kidwell | 3 | 1 | 0 | 4 | SR | Parramatta Eels |
| Toa Kohe-Love | 3 | 0 | 0 | 0 | CE | Warrington Wolves |
| Wairangi Koopu | 2 | 1 | 0 | 4 | SR | Auckland Warriors |
| Kylie Leuluai | 2 | 0 | 0 | 0 | SR | Wests Tigers |
| Odell Manuel | 2 | 0 | 0 | 0 | WG | Auckland Warriors |
| Martin Moana | 3 | 0 | 0 | 0 | LK | Halifax Blue Sox |
| Steve Matthews | 1 | 1 | 0 | 4 | WG | Glenora Bears |
| Jared Mills | 1 | 0 | 0 | 0 | WG | Newtown Jets |
| Chris Nahi | 2 | 0 | 0 | 0 | LF | Unattached |
| Boycie Nelson | 2 | 2 | 0 | 8 | CE | Auckland Warriors |
| Gene Ngamu | 2 | 0 | 4* | 7 | FE | Huddersfield Giants |
| Henry Perenara | 2 | 0 | 1 | 2 | HK | Auckland Warriors |
| Paul Rauhihi | 3 | 1 | 0 | 4 | PR | Newcastle Knights |
| Tahi Reihana | 3 | 0 | 0 | 0 | FR | Bradford Bulls |
| Jeremy Smith | 1 | 0 | 0 | 0 | HB | Altona Roosters |
| Tyran Smith | 3 | 0 | 0 | 0 | SR | Wests Tigers |
| Hare Te Rangi | 2 | 1 | 0 | 4 | FR | Otahuhu Leopards |
| Clinton Toopi | 3 | 2 | 0 | 8 | CE | Auckland Warriors |
| Paul Whatuira | 1 | 0 | 0 | 0 | CE | Auckland Warriors |

- Note * : One of the goals was a field goal.

== Scotland ==
Head coach: (Australia) Shaun McRae

| Player | Games | Tries | Goals | Points | Position | Club |
|---|---|---|---|---|---|---|
| Andrew Purcell (captain) | 2 | 0 | 0 | 0 | SO | Castleford Tigers |
| Danny Arnold | 2 | 1 | 0 | 4 | FB | Huddersfield Giants |
| Geoff Bell | 3 | 1 | 0 | 4 | CE | North Queensland Cowboys |
| Scott Cram | 3 | 0 | 0 | 0 | BR | London Broncos |
| Matt Crowther | 3 | 0 | 4 | 8 | WG | Huddersfield Giants |
| Matthew Daylight | 3 | 0 | 0 | 0 | WG | Hull FC |
| Lee Gilmour | 3 | 0 | 0 | 0 | CE | Wigan Warriors |
| Nathan Graham | 1 | 0 | 0 | 0 | UB | Bradford Bulls |
| Daniel Heckenberg | 3 | 0 | 0 | 0 | FR | St. George Illawarra Dragons |
| Richard Horne | 3 | 0 | 0 | 0 | HB | Hull FC |
| Dale Laughton | 3 | 0 | 0 | 0 | FR | Huddersfield Giants |
| Scott Logan | 3 | 0 | 0 | 0 | SR | Sydney Roosters |
| Graham Mackay | 1 | 0 | 1 | 2 | CE | Leeds Rhinos |
| David Maiden | 3 | 1 | 0 | 4 | LF | Hull FC |
| Wayne McDonald | 3 | 0 | 0 | 0 | FR | Hull FC |
| Lee Penny | 1 | 1 | 0 | 4 | HB | Warrington Wolves |
| Scott Rhodes | 2 | 1 | 0 | 4 | HB | Hull FC |
| Darren Shaw | 3 | 0 | 0 | 0 | LF | Castleford Tigers |
| Adrian Vowles | 3 | 1 | 0 | 4 | LK | Castleford Tigers |
| Mike Wainwright | 0 | 0 | 0 | 0 | LK | Salford City Reds |

== Notes and references ==
=== Positions ===
Northern hemisphere terms

- FB – Fullback
- WG – Wing
- CE – Centre
- SO – Stand-off
- SH – Scrum-half
- PR – Prop
- HK – Hooker
- SR – Second row
- LF – Loose-forward
- UB – Utility back
- N/A

Southern hemisphere terms

- FB – Fullback
- WG – Wing
- CE – Centre
- FE – Five-eighth
- HB – Halfback
- PR – Prop
- HK – Hooker
- SR – Second row
- LK – Lock
- UB – Utility back
- UH – Utility half
