= 2000 Rugby League World Cup Group A =

Group A of the 2000 Rugby League World Cup is one of the four groups in the 2000 Rugby League World Cup.

== Standings ==
Pos	Team	Pld	W	D	L	PF	PA	PD	Pts	Qualification
1	Australia	3	3	0	0	198	14	+184	6	Advance to knockout stage
2	England	3	2	0	1	144	36	+108	4	Advance to knockout stage
3	Fiji	3	1	0	2	56	144	−88	2	
4	Russia	3	0	0	3	20	224	−204	0	

Source: Rugby League Project

== Matches ==
=== England vs Australia ===
This was the first rugby league match to be played at Twickenham Stadium, London's home of rugby union.

28 October 2000
18:30 GMT (UTC±00:00)

England	2–22	Australia
Goals: Farrell (1/1)	Summary	Tries: Sailor (2), Gidley, MacDougall; Goals: Rogers (3/4)

Twickenham Stadium, London
Attendance: 33,758
Referee: David Pakieto (New Zealand)
Player of the Match: Brett Kimmorley (Australia)

=== Fiji vs Russia ===
29 October 2000

Fiji	38–12	Russia
Try: Vunivalu (3), Tuqiri (2), Kuraduadua, Sovatabua; Con: Tuqiri (5/7)	Summary	Try: Rullis, Ilyasov; Con: Zhiltsov (1/1); Mitrofanov (1/1)

Craven Park, Barrow-in-Furness
Attendance: 2,187
Referee: Russell Smith

Fiji:
1. Lote Tuqiri, 2. Jone Kuraduadua, 3. Waisale Sovatabua, 4. Eparama Navale, 5. Semi Tadulala, 6. Stephen Smith
7. Kalaveti Tuiabayaba, 8. Tabua Cakacaka, 9. Freddie Robarts, 10. Etuate Vakatawa, 11. Joe Tamani, 12. Samuela Marayawa, 13. Atunasia Vunivalu.
Substitutes: 14. Farasiko Tokarei, 15. Josefa Lasagavibau, 16. Amani Takayawa, 17. Peceli Vuniyayawa.

Russia:
1. Robert Ilyasov, 2. Mikhail Mitrofanov, 3. Matt Donovan, 4. Craig Cygler, 5. Maxim Romanov, 6. Andrei Olari, 7. Igor Gavrilin
8. Ian Rubin, 8. Alexandr Lysenkov, 10. Robert Campbell, 11. Petr Sokolov, 12. Aaron Findlay, 13. Joel Rullis.
Substitutes: Pavel Kalashkin, Viktor Nechaev, Igor Zhiltsov, Vadim Postnikov.

=== Australia vs Fiji ===
Australians Ben Kennedy, Trent Barrett and Nathan Hindmarsh were selected to make their Kangaroo debuts in this match.

1 November 2000

Australia	66–8	Fiji
Try: Rogers (4), Girdler (2), Kennedy (2), Hindmarsh, Barrett, MacDougall, Gidley; Con: Rogers (9/12)	Summary	Try: Cakacaka (m), Tuqiri (m); Con: ? (0/2)

Gateshead International Stadium, Gateshead
Attendance: 4,197
Referee: Robert Connolly

Australia:
1. Darren Lockyer, 2. Mat Rogers, 3. Ryan Girdler, 4. Matt Gidley, 5. Adam MacDougall, 6. Trent Barrett, 7. Andrew Johns, 8. Jason Stevens, 9. Craig Gower, 10. Michael Vella, 11. Ben Kennedy, 12. Nathan Hindmarsh, 13. Brad Fittler.
Substitutes: Scott Hill, Jason Croker, Robbie Kearns, Shane Webcke.
Coach: Chris Anderson

Tries: Rogers 4, Kennedy 2, Barrett, Hindmarsh, MacDougall, Girdler 2, Gidley.
Goals: Rogers 9.

Fiji:
1. Lote Tuqiri, 2. Jone Kuraduadua, 3. Waisale Sovatabua, 4. Eparama Navale, 5. Semi Tadulala, 6. Stephen Smith, 7. Kaleveti Naisoro, 8. Tabua Cakacaka, 9. Fred Robarts, 10. Etuate Vakatawa, 11. Joe Tamani, 12. Samuela Marayawa, 13. Atunasia Vunivialu.
Substitutes: Farasiko Tokarei, Mesake Navugona, Amani Takayawa, Peceli Wawavanua.

=== England vs Russia ===
1 November 2000

England	76–4	Russia
Try: Sinfield (3), Jamie Peacock (2), Long (2), Rowley (2), Walker, Stephenson, Hay, Deacon, Pryce; Con: Farrell (5), Long (5)	Summary	Pen: Mitrofanov (2)

Knowsley Road, St Helens
Attendance: 5,736
Referee: Bill Shrimpton

=== England vs Fiji ===
4 November 2000

England	66–10	Fiji
Try: Jamie Peacock (3), Wellens (2), Rogers (2), Naylor, Hay, Radlinski, Smith, Farrell; Con: Farrell (9/12)	Summary	Try: Tuqiri (m), Navale (c), Con: Vunivalu (1/2)

Headingley Rugby Stadium, Leeds
Attendance: 10,052
Referee: Thierry Alibert

=== Australia vs Russia ===
4 November 2000

Australia	110–4	Russia
Try: Sailor (4), Girdler (3), Croker (2), Hindmarsh (2), Barrett (2), Johns, Tallis, Fletcher, Webcke, MacDougall, Gidley; Con: Girdler (17/19)	Summary	Try: Matt Donovan; Con: Mikhail Mitrofanov (0/2)

The Boulevard, Hull
Attendance: 3,044
Referee: Stuart Cummings
