= 2000 Rugby League World Cup qualifying =

2000 Rugby League World Cup qualification
Tournament details
- Dates: 9 November 1999 – 21 November 1999
- Teams: 6 (from 2 confederations)

Tournament statistics
- Matches played: 7

2000 Rugby League World Cup qualifying was contested by the national rugby league football teams of Lebanon, the United States, Morocco, Canada, Italy and Japan for the 16th spot in the 2000 Rugby League World Cup tournament. Lebanon won the tournament and went on to the World Cup.

== Automatics ==
The following teams were invited to the 2000 Rugby League World Cup:

- Australia (automatic qualifier)
- New Zealand (automatic qualifier)
- Māori (automatic qualifier)
- Papua New Guinea (automatic qualifier)
- Tonga (automatic qualifier)
- Fiji (automatic qualifier)
- Samoa (automatic qualifier)
- Cook Islands (automatic qualifier)
- England (automatic qualifier and co-host)
- Wales (automatic qualifier and co-host)
- France (automatic qualifier and co-host)
- Ireland (automatic qualifier and co-host)
- Scotland (automatic qualifier and co-host)
- Russia (automatic qualifier)
- South Africa (automatic qualifier)
- Lebanon (winner of the qualifying group)

== Qualification tournament ==
The final spot was contested for by the following tournament:

=== Pool A ===
The first pool of World Cup qualifiers involved teams from the Mediterranean; Lebanon, Italy and Morocco. These matches were held in France.

Team	Pld	W	D	L	PF	PA	+/−	Pts
Lebanon	2	2	0	0	140	16	124	4
Italy	2	1	0	1	50	36	14	2
Morocco	2	0	0	2	0	138	-138	0

11 November 1999

Lebanon	36–16	Italy
	Summary

Stade Jean-Laffon, Perpignan

14 November 1999

Italy	34–0	Morocco
	Summary

Stade des Minimes, Toulouse

17 November 1999

Morocco	0–104	Lebanon
	Summary

Parc des Sports, Avignon

=== Pool B ===
The second pool of World Cup qualifiers involved teams from the Pacific Rim; United States, Japan and Canada. Pool B qualifiers were held in Orlando, Florida, United States.

Team	Pld	W	D	L	PF	PA	+/−	Pts
United States	2	2	0	0	122	0	122	4
Japan	2	1	0	1	14	54	-40	2
Canada	2	0	0	2	0	82	-82	0

9 November 1999

United States	54–0	Japan
	Summary

Disney's Wide World of Sports Complex, Kissimmee
Referee: Steve Ganson (England)

11 November 1999

Japan	14–0	Canada
	Summary

Disney's Wide World of Sports Complex, Kissimmee
Referee: Steve Ganson (England)

15 November 1999

United States	68–0	Canada
	Summary

Disney's Wide World of Sports Complex, Kissimmee

=== Final ===
21 November 1999

United States	8–62	Lebanon
Tries: Mains; Goals: Niu (2); Sin Bin: Matautia; Sent Off: Faimalo	Summary; Report	Tries: Coorey (3), Khoury (2), Chalal, Chehade, El Masri, Lambert, Salem, Touma; Goals: El Masri (9); Sin Bin: Chamoun, Maroon

Disney's Wide World of Sports Complex, Orlando
Referee: Stuart Cummings (England)

FB	1	Brian Warren
RW	2	Cory Sheridan
RC	3	Rob Balachandran
LC	4	Loren Broussard
LW	5	Tony Fabri
SO	6	Fred Backhaus
SH	7	David Niu
PR	8	Vila Matautia (yellow card)
HK	9	Daryl Howland
PR	10	Julian O'Neill
SR	11	Shayne Mains
SR	12	Joe Faimalo (red card)
LF	13	Jeff Preston
Substitutions:
IC	14	Ed Woodridge
IC	15	Mike Edwards
IC	16	David Bowe
IC	17	Bill Hansbury
Coach:
(Australia) Shane Millard

FB	1	Mohamed Chahal
RW	2	Rabie Chehade
RC	3	David Lambert
LC	4	Hazem El Masri
LW	5	Hassan Saleh
FE	6	Fady Elchad
HB	7	Paul Khoury
PR	8	Darren Maroon (yellow card)
HK	9	Nedol Saleh
PR	10	Sami Chamoun (yellow card)
SR	11	Chris Salem
SR	12	Charlie Nohra
LK	13	Michael Coorey
Substitutions:
IC	14	Ray Daher
IC	15	Anthony Mansour
IC	16	George Raad
IC	17	Travis Touma
Coach:
(Australia) Steve Ghosn
