= Rugby League World Cup qualification =

Process a national team goes through to qualify for the Rugby League World Cup Finals

- Upcoming tournament 2026 Men's Rugby League World Cup qualification
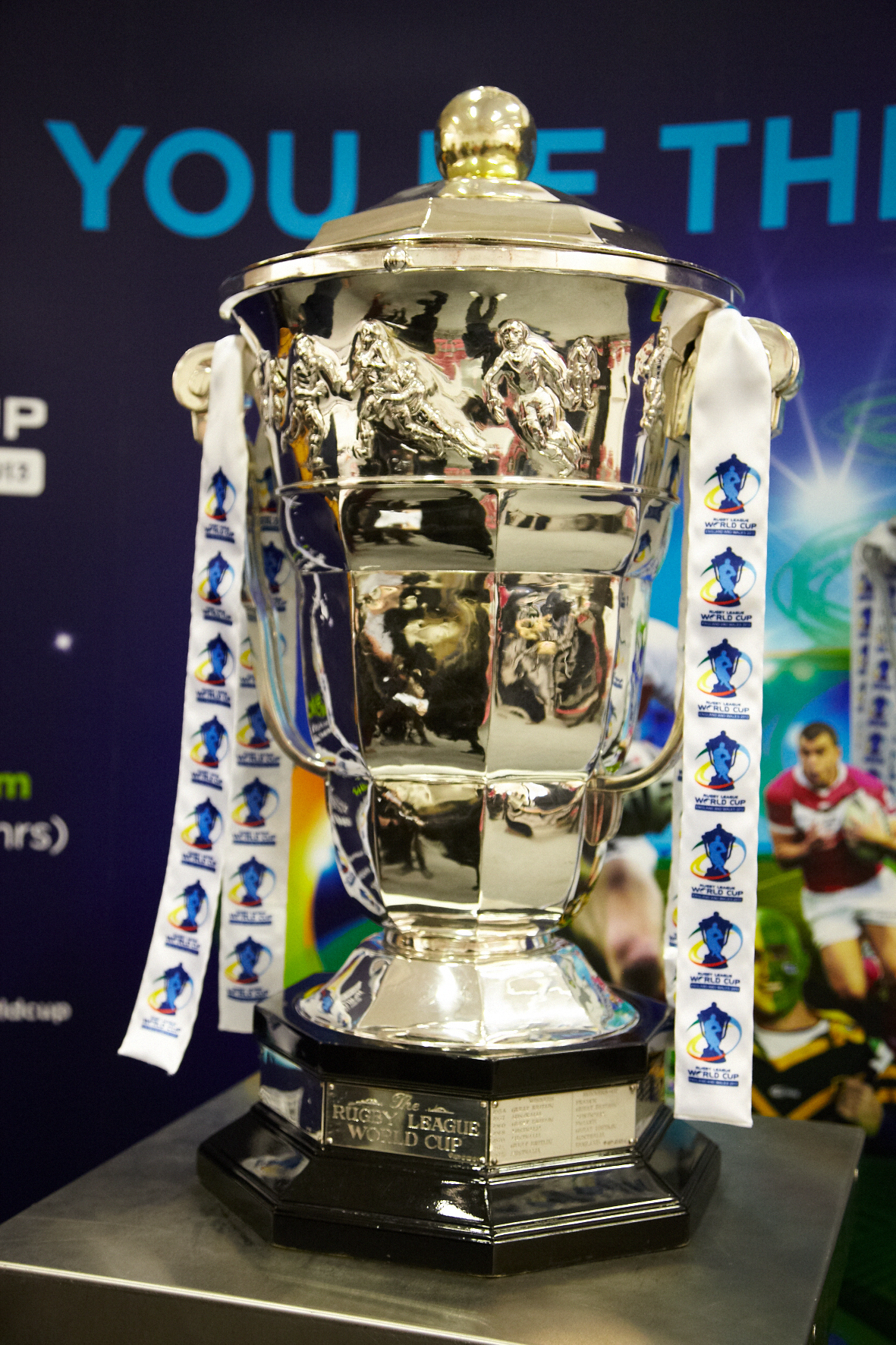
- Sport: Rugby league
- Instituted: 2000; 26 years ago
- Region: International (IRL)

The Rugby League World Cup qualification is the process a national team goes through to qualify for the Rugby League World Cup Finals.

Qualifying rounds were first introduced for the 2000 World Cup to reflect the recent expansion of the tournament.

From 2017 hosts and teams reaching the knockout rounds of the previous tournament automatically qualify for the next. The remaining spots are achieved through regional qualification tournaments, split between the four International Rugby League confederation Asia-Pacific, Americas, Europe, and Middle East-Africa.

Prior to this qualification tournament occurred in more random groups and major rugby league nations were still invited without need for qualification.

Because of a changing number of teams making the finals and entering the qualifiers, and the unpredictability of the geographic spread of teams automatically qualifying, the format of the qualification tournament has changed with each edition of the tournament.

== Pre-qualification era ==
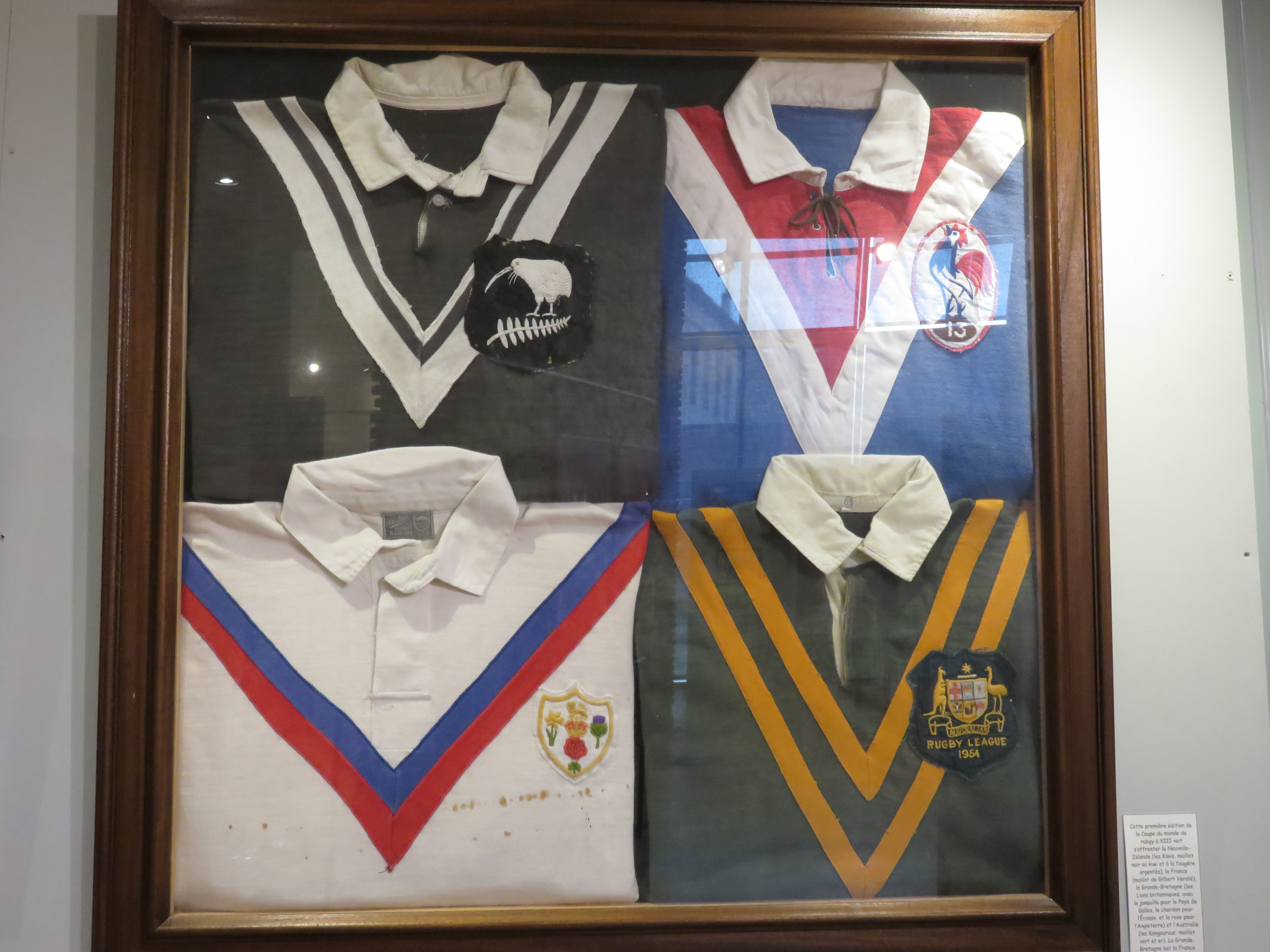
New Zealand (TL), France (TR), Great Britain (BL), and Australia (BR) shirts from the inaugural 1954 tournament. They were the four nations to compete in the competition until the 1980s.

=== 1954–1977 ===
In the first eight edition of the tournament only four teams were invited to participate. These were:

- Australia
- France
- Great Britain
- New Zealand

NB: In 1975 Great Britain split into England and Wales for a one-off tournament due to Wales wanting to showcase their influx of Welsh talent they had at the time. No Scottish or Irish player made the original Great Britain squad for that year.

=== 1985–1992 ===
For the next two editions of the tournament, a fifth nation was invited to participate:

- Papua New Guinea

=== 1995 ===
Following the expansion of the tournament to a group and knockout format, the number of participating teams increase as well. The initial tournament of the modern era would be the final invited only tournament with four new teams making debut:

- Fiji
- Samoa
- South Africa
- Tonga

In addition, the two established British home nation sides began their regular participation in the tournament as separate entities:

- England
- Wales

== 2000 ==
For 2000, the tournament was expanded to 16 teams. 15 gained automatic qualification or were invited:

- Australia
- Cook Islands
- England (hosts)
- Fiji
- France (hosts)
- Ireland (hosts)
- Māori
- New Zealand
- Papua New Guinea
- Russia
- Samoa
- Scotland (hosts)
- South Africa
- Tonga
- Wales (hosts)

The 16th place was fought for by six teams:

Team	Pld	W	D	L	PF	PA	+/−	Pts
Lebanon	2	2	0	0	140	16	124	4
Italy	2	1	0	1	50	36	14	2
Morocco	2	0	0	2	0	138	-138	0
Team	Pld	W	D	L	PF	PA	+/−	Pts
United States	2	2	0	0	122	0	122	4
Japan	2	1	0	1	14	54	-40	2
Canada	2	0	0	2	0	82	-82	0

21 November 1999

United States	8–62	Lebanon
Tries: Mains; Goals: Niu (2); Sin Bin: Matautia; Sent Off: Faimalo	Summary; Report	Tries: Coorey (3), Khoury (2), Chalal, Chehade, El Masri, Lambert, Salem, Touma; Goals: El Masri (9); Sin Bin: Chamoun, Maroon

Disney's Wide World of Sports Complex, Orlando
Referee: Stuart Cummings (England)

== 2008 ==
=== Hosts and Invitees ===
- Australia (hosts)
- England
- France
- New Zealand
- Papua New Guinea

=== Europe ===
Round 1

Team	Pld	W	D	L	PF	PA	+/−	Pts	Qualification
Russia	3	3	0	0	108	20	+88	6	Advance to Second Round
Georgia	3	2	0	1	102	50	+52	4	Ejected
Netherlands	3	1	0	2	68	123	–55	2	Failed to qualify
Serbia	3	0	0	3	42	127	–85	0	Failed to qualify

Round 2
Group A

Team	Pld	W	D	L	PF	PA	+/−	Pts	Qualification
Scotland	2	1	0	1	37	32	+5	2	Qualified for World Cup
Wales	2	1	0	1	32	37	–5	2	Advance to Intercontinental Playoff

Group B

Team	Pld	W	D	L	PF	PA	+/−	Pts	Qualification
Ireland	4	2	2	0	142	64	78	6	Qualified for World Cup
Lebanon	4	2	2	0	104	42	62	6	Advance to Interncontinental Playoff
Russia	4	0	0	4	38	178	−140	0	Failed to qualify

=== Pacific ===
Team	Pld	W	D	L	PF	PA	+/−	Pts	Qualification
Tonga	3	2	0	1	102	54	48	4	Qualified for World Cup
Fiji	3	2	0	1	98	62	36	4	Qualified for World Cup
Samoa	3	2	0	1	86	52	34	4	Advances to Intercontinental Playoffs
Cook Islands	3	0	0	3	24	142	−118	0	Failed to qualify for World Cup

=== Other ===
28 October 2006

United States	54–18	Japan

Aston Community Center Field, Aston
Attendance: 1,200

United States advance to Intercontinental playoffs

=== Intercontinental ===
Semi-finals

9 November 2007

Wales	26–50	Lebanon
Tries: Gibson (3); Blackwood; Bracek; Goals: Harris (2/4); Briers		Tries: Salem (3); El Zbaideh; Kourouche; Moujalli; Ndaira; Saab; Samia Goals: Nicolas (7/9)

Halton Stadium, Widnes
Attendance: 753

9 November 2007

United States	10–42	Samoa

Halton Stadium, Widnes
Attendance: 753

Final

14 November 2007

Lebanon	16–38	Samoa

Post Office Road, Featherstone
Attendance: 1,323

Samoa qualify for World Cup

== 2013 ==
=== Hosts and Invitees ===
- Australia
- Cook Islands
- England (hosts)
- Fiji
- France
- Ireland
- New Zealand
- Papua New Guinea
- Samoa
- Scotland
- Tonga
- Wales (hosts)

=== Atlantic ===
Team	Pld	W	D	L	TF	PF	PA	+/−	BP	Pts
United States	2	2	0	0	0	80	8	+72	0	4
Jamaica	2	1	0	1	0	24	46	−22	0	2
South Africa	2	0	0	2	0	10	60	−50	0	0

=== Europe ===
Team	Pld	W	D	L	PF	PA	+/−	Pts
Italy	3	2	1	0	163	31	+132	5
Lebanon	3	2	1	0	147	23	+124	5
Russia	3	1	0	2	42	152	−110	2
Serbia	3	0	0	3	38	184	−146	0

== 2017 ==
=== Automatic ===
- Australia (as well as hosts)
- England
- Fiji
- France
- New Zealand (as well as hosts)
- Papua New Guinea (as hosts)
- Samoa
- Scotland

=== Americas ===
Team	Pld	W	D	L	PF	PA	PD	Pts
United States	2	2	0	0	54	38	+16	4
Jamaica	2	0	1	1	32	38	−6	1
Canada	2	0	1	1	42	52	−10	1

=== Asia-Pacific ===
17 October 2015

Tonga	28 – 8	Cook Islands
Try: Tafua 13' c Fonua 34' c Kata (2) 63', 68' c Terepo 74' c Goal: Kata (4/5) 14', 35', 69', 75'	Report	Try: Nicoll-Klokstad 4'; Gelling 23' Goal: Rapana (0/2)

Campbelltown Stadium, Campbelltown
Attendance: 4,813
Referee: (Australia) Gerard Sutton
Player of the Match: Solomone Kata (Tonga)

=== Europe ===
Euro C

Team	Played	Won	Drawn	Lost	For	Against	Difference	Points
Spain	2	2	0	0	116	34	82	4
Malta	2	1	0	1	60	40	20	2
Greece	2	0	0	2	4	106	-102	0

Green: Advance to A

Euro B

Team	Pld	W	D	L	PF	PA	+/−	Pts
Serbia	6	5	0	1	196	73	+123	10
Russia	6	4	0	2	137	31	+106	8
Italy	6	3	0	3	142	54	+88	6
Ukraine	6	0	0	6	80	256	–176	0

Green: Advance to A

Euro A
Group A

Pos	Team	Pld	W	D	L	PF	PA	PD	Pts	Qualification
1	Wales	2	2	0	0	70	14	+56	4	Qualification for 2017 Rugby League World Cup
2	Italy	2	1	0	1	76	34	+42	2	Advance to fourth round
3	Serbia	2	0	0	2	14	112	−98	0	

Group B

Pos	Team	Pld	W	D	L	PF	PA	PD	Pts	Qualification
1	Ireland	2	2	0	0	116	22	+94	4	Qualification for 2017 Rugby League World Cup
2	Russia	2	1	0	1	56	76	−20	2	Advance to fourth round
3	Spain	2	0	0	2	12	86	−74	0	

Playoff

4 November 2016
20:00 GMT (UTC+0:00)

Italy	76–0	Russia
Tries: Castellaro (2), Cerruto (2), Lepori (2), Wilkie (2), Campese, Celerino, Centrone, Santi, Wakeman, Walker; Goals: Campese (10/14)	Report (RLIF)

Leigh Sports Village, Leigh
Attendance: 450
Referee: Chris Campbell (England)
Player of the Match: Terry Campese (Italy)

=== Middle East-Africa ===
25 October 2015	South Africa	12–40	Lebanon	Bosman Stadium, Brakpan
31 October 2015	South Africa	16–50	Lebanon	Bosman Stadium, Brakpan

== 2021 ==
=== Automatic ===
- Australia
- England (as well as hosts)
- Fiji
- Lebanon
- New Zealand
- Papua New Guinea
- Samoa
- Tonga

=== Americas ===
Semi-finals
Canada	8
Jamaica	38
United States	62
Chile	0

Final
United States	10
Jamaica	16

Jamaica qualify
United States advance to Intercontinental playoffs

=== Europe ===
Round 1

Pos	Team	Pld	W	D	L	PF	PA	PD	Pts	Qualification
1	France	3	3	0	0	106	38	+68	6	Qualification for 2021 Rugby League World Cup
2	Wales	3	2	0	1	108	74	+34	4	Qualification for 2021 Rugby League World Cup
3	Ireland	3	1	0	2	54	74	−20	2	Advance to Europe Repêchage for 2021 World Cup qualification
4	Scotland	3	0	0	3	32	114	−82	0	Advance to Europe Repêchage for 2021 World Cup qualification

Source: ERL

Playoffs
Group A

Pos	Team	Pld	W	D	L	PF	PA	PD	Pts	Qualification
1	Ireland	2	2	0	0	67	12	+55	4	Qualification for 2021 Rugby League World Cup
2	Italy	2	1	0	1	38	29	+9	2	Qualification for 2021 Rugby League World Cup
3	Spain	2	0	0	2	12	76	−64	0	

Source: ERL

Group B

Pos	Team	Pld	W	D	L	PF	PA	PD	Pts	Qualification
1	Scotland	2	2	0	0	128	24	+104	4	Qualification for 2021 Rugby League World Cup
2	Greece	2	1	0	1	106	48	+58	2	Qualification for 2021 Rugby League World Cup
3	Serbia	2	0	0	2	6	168	−162	0	

Source: ERL

=== Intercontinental ===
Play-off qualifier		Play-off
		United States	16
Cook Islands	66	Cook Islands	38
South Africa	6

Cook Islands qualify

== 2026 ==
=== Automatic ===
- Australia (as well as hosts)
- England
- Fiji
- Lebanon
- New Zealand
- Papua New Guinea (as well as hosts)
- Samoa
- Tonga

=== Europe ===
Semi-finals
France	74
Ukraine	8
Serbia	0
Wales	48

Final
France	48
Wales	6

France advance to Intercontinental playoffs

=== Intercontinental ===
- France 36–0 Jamaica
- Cook Islands 58–6 South Africa

France and Cook Islands qualify for the World Cup.

== Results ==
As of the 2021 tournament, 21 different teams have competed in at least one world cup either via invitation or qualification. Australia, France, and New Zealand, are the only teams to have completed in every tournament. England has also participate in every tournament but competed as Great Britain prior to 1995 with the exception of 1975.

Team	(France) 1954	(Australia) 1957	(United Kingdom) 1960	(Australia) (New Zealand) 1968	(United Kingdom) 1970	(France) 1972	(Australia) (France) (New Zealand) (United Kingdom) 1975	(Australia) (New Zealand) 1977	1985–1988	1989–1992	(England) 1995	(England) (Ireland) (France) (Scotland) (Wales) 2000	(Australia) 2008	(England) (Wales) 2013	(Australia) (New Zealand) (Papua New Guinea) 2017	(England) 2021	(Australia) (Papua New Guinea) 2026	Years
Australia	INV	INV	INV	INV	INV	INV	INV	INV	INV	INV	INV	INV	INV	INV	AQ	AQ	AQ	17
Cook Islands	-	-	-	-	-	-	-	-	-	-	-	INV	DNQ	INV	DNQ	Q	Q	4
England	-	-	-	-	-	-	INV	-	-	-	INV	INV	INV	INV	AQ	AQ	AQ	8^{a}
Fiji	-	-	-	-	-	-	-	-	-	-	INV	INV	INV	INV	AQ	AQ	AQ	7
France	INV	INV	INV	INV	INV	INV	INV	INV	INV	INV	INV	INV	INV	INV	AQ	Q	Q	17
Great Britain	INV	INV	INV	INV	INV	INV	-	INV	INV	INV	-	-	-	-	-	-	-	9^{a}
Greece	-	-	-	-	-	-	-	-	-	-	-	-	-	-	DNQ	Q	-	1
Ireland	-	-	-	-	-	-	-	-	-	-	-	INV	Q	INV	Q	Q	-	5^{a}
Italy	-	-	-	-	-	-	-	-	-	-	-	DNQ	-	Q	Q	Q	-	3
Jamaica	-	-	-	-	-	-	-	-	-	-	-	-	-	DNQ	DNQ	Q	DNQ	1
Lebanon	-	-	-	-	-	-	-	-	-	-	-	Q	DNQ	DNQ	Q	AQ	AQ	4
Māori	-	-	-	-	-	-	-	-	-	-	-	INV	-	-	-	-	-	1
New Zealand	INV	INV	INV	INV	INV	INV	INV	INV	INV	INV	INV	INV	INV	INV	AQ	AQ	AQ	17
Papua New Guinea	-	-	-	-	-	-	-	-	INV	INV	INV	INV	INV	INV	AQ	AQ	AQ	9
Russia	-	-	-	-	-	-	-	-	-	-	-	INV	DNQ	DNQ	DNQ	SUP	SUP	1^{b}
Samoa	-	-	-	-	-	-	-	-	-	-	INV	INV	Q	INV	AQ	AQ	AQ	7
Scotland	-	-	-	-	-	-	-	-	-	-	-	INV	Q	INV	AQ	Q	-	5^{a}
South Africa	-	-	-	-	-	-	-	-	-	-	INV	INV	DNQ	DNQ	DNQ	DNQ	DNQ	2
Tonga	-	-	-	-	-	-	-	-	-	-	INV	INV	Q	INV	Q	AQ	AQ	7
United States	-	-	-	-	-	-	-	-	-	-	-	DNQ	DNQ	Q	Q	DNQ	-	2^{c}
Wales	-	-	-	-	-	-	INV	-	-	-	INV	INV	DNQ	INV	Q	Q	DNQ	6^{a}
Total	4	4	4	4	4	4	5	4	5	5	10	16	10	14	14	16	10	

Legend

- = Hosts
- INV = Invited
- AQ = Automatically Qualified
- Q = Qualified
- DNQ = Did not qualify
- - = Did not participate or was not invited
- SUP = Suspended

^{a} Competed as Great Britain in nine previous tournaments. The squads largely consisted of English players, but also featured Welsh players in every tournament. Scotland (1954, 1968, 1977, 1989–92), and Ireland (1957) were represented by native-born players in some tournaments.
^{b} After the 2022 Russian invasion of Ukraine, Russia has been banned from all international tournaments.
^{c} The United States was invited to the 1954 World Cup, but later canceled their invitation.

== Participation ==
The following table shows the number of years each team has completed in both the qualifiers and final tournament. Bold inducates teams automatically qualified or were invited to participate.

Updated for 2026 World Cup

Team	Qualifiers	Finals
Australia	0	17 (1954, 1957, 1960, 1968, 1970, 1972, 1975, 1977, 1985–88, 1989–92, 1995, 2000, 2008, 2013, 2017, 2021, 2026)
Canada	3 (2000, 2017, 2021)	0
Chile	1 (2021)	0
Cook Islands	4 (2008, 2017, 2021, 2026)	6 (2000, 2008, 2013, 2017, 2021, 2026)
England	0	8 (1975, 1995, 2000, 2008, 2013, 2017, 2021, 2026)
Fiji	1 (2008)	7 (1995, 2000, 2008, 2013, 2017, 2021, 2026)
France	2 (2021, 2026)	17 (1954, 1957, 1960, 1968, 1970, 1972, 1975, 1977, 1985–88, 1989–92, 1995, 2000, 2008, 2013, 2017, 2021, 2026)
Georgia	1 (2008)	0
Great Britain	0	9 (1954, 1957, 1960, 1968, 1970, 1972, 1977, 1985–88, 1989–92, 1995)
Greece	2 (2017, 2021)	1 (2021)
Ireland	3 (2008, 2017, 2021)	5 (2000, 2008, 2013, 2017, 2021)
Italy	4 (2000, 2013, 2017, 2021)	3 (2013, 2017, 2021)
Jamaica	4 (2013, 2017, 2021, 2026)	1 (2021)
Japan	2 (2000, 2008)	0
Lebanon	4 (2000, 2008, 2013, 2017)	4 (2000, 2017, 2021, 2026)
Malta	3 (2017, 2021)	0
Morocco	1 (2000)	0
Netherlands	1 (2008)	0
New Zealand	0	17 (1954, 1957, 1960, 1968, 1970, 1972, 1975, 1977, 1985–88, 1989–92, 1995, 2000, 2008, 2013, 2017, 2021, 2026)
Russia	4 (2008, 2013, 2017, 2021)	1 (2000)
Samoa	1 (2008)	6 (2000, 2008, 2013, 2017, 2021, 2026)
Scotland	2 (2008, 2021)	5 (2000, 2008, 2013, 2017, 2021)
Serbia	5 (2008, 2013, 2017, 2021, 2026)	0
South Africa	4 (2013, 2017, 2021, 2026)	2 (1995, 2000)
Spain	2 (2017, 2021)	0
Tonga	2 (2008, 2017)	7 (1995, 2000, 2008, 2013, 2017, 2021, 2026)
Wales	4 (2008, 2017, 2021, 2026)	6 (1975, 1995, 2000, 2013, 2017, 2021)
United States	5 (2000, 2008, 2013, 2017, 2021)	2 (2013, 2017)
Ukraine	4 (2017, 2021, 2026)	0

== Debuts ==
The following table shows which years teams made their qualification tournament debut. It doesn't not include teams that have previously qualified automatically or invited to participate.

Year	Americas	Asia-Pacific	Europe	Middle East-Africa	Total
2000 (England) (France) (Ireland) (Scotland) (Wales)	United States; Canada	Japan	Italy	Lebanon; Morocco	6
2008 (Australia)		Cook Islands	Georgia; Netherlands; Serbia		4
2013 (England) (Wales)	Jamaica				1
2017 (Australia) (New Zealand) (Papua New Guinea)			Greece; Malta; Spain; Ukraine		5
2021 (England)	Chile				1
Total	4	2	7	2	15
