= Zhiltsov =

Zhiltsov feminine: Zhiltsova (Russian: Жильцов, from zhilets, a position and social category in Muscovy and Russian Tsardom, is a Russian patronymic surname. It may refer to

- Igor Zhiltsov (born 1966), Russian rugby league player
- Konstantin Zhiltsov (born 1983), Russian football player
- Lev Zhiltsov (1928–1996), Soviet admiral
- Svetlana Zhiltsova (1936–2026), Soviet TV presenter
