= Lysenkov =

Lysenkov, feminine: Lysenkova is a surname of Ukrainian origin, a patronymic derivation from the surname Lysenko. Notable people with the surname include:

- Alexandr Lysenkov (born 1973), Russian rugby league footballer
- Alexandr Lysenkov (born 1973), Russian rugby league footballer
