= Adam Donovan =

Adam Donovan may refer to:

- Adam Donovan (musician)
- Adam Donovan (rugby league) (born 1976), Australian rugby league footballer
- Adam Donovan (Hollyoaks), fictional character introduced in 2016
