= Igor Gavrilin =

Igor Gavrilin may refer to:

- Igor Gavrilin (rugby league) (born 1971), Russian rugby league footballer and rugby union coach
- Igor Gavrilin (footballer) (born 1972), Russian professional football coach and former player
