= Michael Anderson =

Michael Anderson may refer to:

== Sport ==
- Michael Anderson Pereira da Silva (born 1983), Brazilian footballer better known simply as Michael
- Michael Anderson (basketball) (born 1966), American basketball player
- Michael Anderson (cricketer, born 1960), cricketer for Northumberland
- Michael Anderson (cricketer, born 1916) (1916–1940), first-class cricketer
- Michael Anderson (swimmer) (born 1987), Australian Paralympian
- Mikey Anderson (born 1999), American ice hockey player

== Music ==
- Michael Anderson (Building 429 drummer), Christian rock band drummer
- Michael Anderson (Altered Images drummer), Scottish New Wave/post-punk band drummer

== Other ==
- Ghillar Michael Anderson (born 1951), Australian Aboriginal elder, namesake of asteroid 10040 Ghillar
- Michael Anderson Jr. (born 1943), British actor, son of Michael Anderson (director)
- Michael T. Anderson (born 1950), American mathematician
- Michael Anderson (director) (1920–2018), British film director
- Michael J. Anderson (born 1953), American actor, small person
- Michael John Anderson (born 1988), convicted of murder in 2009
- Michael P. Anderson (1959–2003), African-American astronaut killed in the Space Shuttle Columbia disaster in 2003
- Michael Anderson (historian) (born 1942), economic historian
- Michael L. Anderson, philosopher and cognitive scientist

== See also ==
- Michael Andersen (born 1974), Danish basketball player
- Michael Andersson (disambiguation)
- Mikael Andersson (disambiguation)
- Mike Anderson (disambiguation)
