= Michael Andersson =

Michael Andersson may refer to:

- Michael Andersson (cyclist) (born 1967), retired road bicycle racer from Sweden
- Michael Andersson (footballer) (born 1959), Swedish former football player and manager
- Michael Andersson (rugby league), Cook Islander rugby league footballer

== See also ==
- Michael Anderson (disambiguation)
- Mikael Andersson (disambiguation)
