= Vakatawa =

Vakatawa is a surname. Notable people with the surname include:

- Etuate Vakatawa, Fijian rugby league player
- Virimi Vakatawa (born 1992), Fijian-born French rugby union player
