= Vaine =

Vaine is a name. Notable people with this name include:

- Krissy Vaine, American model
- Vaine Kino, Cook Islands rugby player
- Vaine Mokoroa, Cook Islands politician
- Vaine Wichman, Cook Islands politician
- Vaine Rere, Cook Islands politician
- Vaine Wilton Ivie (1907–1969), American arachnologist
