= George Katrib =

Former Lebanon international rugby league footballer

Personal information
- Full name: George Katrib
- Born: Sydney, New South Wales, Australia

Playing information
- Position: Centre
Representative
Years	Team	Pld	T	G	FG	P
2000	Lebanon	2	0	0	0	0

George Katrib is an Australian former rugby league footballer who represented Lebanon at the 2000 Rugby League World Cup.

== Background ==
Katrib was born in Sydney, New South Wales, Australia.

== Playing career ==
From the Sydney Bulls, Katrib was selected for Lebanon's 2000 World Cup squad. He started the first match at centre and was one of three players requiring medical treatment for hypothermia after the match due to the poor weather in Gloucester. He missed the second match due to a knee injury, playing in the third match from the bench.
