= Arnold Krewanty =

PNG international rugby league footballer

Personal information
- Born: Port Moresby, Papua New Guinea

Playing information
- Position: Wing
Club
Years	Team	Pld	T	G	FG	P
1989	Newcastle Knights	2	0	0	0	0
Representative
Years	Team	Pld	T	G	FG	P
1987–91	Papua New Guinea	10	1	0	0	4
1988	Rest of the World	1	0	0	0	0
- Relatives: Alex Krewanty (brother)

Arnold Krewanty is a Papua New Guinean former professional rugby league footballer. He played for the Newcastle Knights in 1989. He played for Papua New Guinea from 1987 to 1988 and 1990 to 1991.

He moved to Wagga Wagga, in New South Wales, Australia to start a job at the RAAF base. Whilst based here he played for the Wagga Brothers club.

While playing for Port Moresby in 1988 he represented Papua New Guinea in a Test match against the touring Great Britain Lions.

Krewanty became the Chairman of Selectors of the PNG team, and is the team manager of the PNG Hunters in the Queensland Cup.

He is the brother of fellow International, Alex Krewanty.
