= Mike Anderson =

Mike Anderson may refer to:

- Mike Anderson (running back) (born 1973), American football player
- Mike Anderson (linebacker) (born 1949), former American football player
- Mike Anderson (offensive lineman) (born 1961), Canadian football
- Mike Anderson (basketball, born 1959), college basketball coach
- Mike Anderson (basketball, born 1986), basketball player
- Mike Anderson (outfielder) (born 1951), major league outfielder
- Mike Anderson (pitcher) (born 1966), major league pitcher
- Mike Anderson (baseball coach) (born 1965), college baseball coach
- Mike Anderson (curler) (born 1985), Canadian curler
- Mike B. Anderson (born 1973), American television and film director for The Simpsons
- Mikey Anderson (born 1999), American ice hockey player
- Cornealious Michael Anderson III (born 1977), reformed criminal
- Mike Anderson (runner) (born 1962), American middle-distance runner, 1983 800 m All-American for the Ohio State Buckeyes track and field team

== See also ==
- Mike Andersen (born 1977), Danish songwriter, singer and guitarist
- Michael Anderson (disambiguation)
