= Vyacheslav Artashin =

Russian rugby league player (1972–2014)

Personal information
- Full name: Vyacheslav Viktorovich Artashin
- Born: 17 March 1972 Kazan, Russia
- Died: 22 May 2014 (aged 42) Kazan, Russia

Playing information
- Position: Prop
Club
Years	Team	Pld	T	G	FG	P
	Strela Kazan
Representative
Years	Team	Pld	T	G	FG	P
2000	Russia	1	0	0	0	0

Vyacheslav Viktorovich Artashin (Вячеслав Викторович Арташин) (Kazan, 17 March 1972 - Kazan, 22 May 2014) was a Russian rugby league footballer and referee. His position of choice was usually in the forwards at prop.

He played for Strela Kazan in the Championship of Russia, having won several titles. Artashin represented the USSR youth rugby team and the Russian national side on several occasions most notably at the 2000 World Cup. At the end of his playing career, Artashin organised various kids', junior and senior rugby sevens, rugby league and beach rugby tournaments, which he also refereed. He was also a referee at the 2013 Summer Universiade rugby sevens matches. Artashin was named Master of Sports of Russia in 2003 and took part at several senior tournaments.

His ex-wife, Ellina Skvostsova and their daughter, Daria, died in a plane crash in Kazan on 17 November 2013, and on 22 May 2014, he died of a heart attack.

A trophy awarded to one of the junior rugby sevens teams in the Volga District was named after Vyacheslav Artashin: in 2015 it was presented to the winners by his brother Sergey.
