= Rinat Shamsutdinov =

Russian rugby league footballer

Personal information
- Full name: Rinat Akhmedovich Shamsutdinov
- Born: 23 January 1971 (age 55) Kazan, Russia

Playing information
- Position: Wing, Stand-off
Club
Years	Team	Pld	T	G	FG	P
	Strela Kazan
Representative
Years	Team	Pld	T	G	FG	P
2000–2005	Russia	4	0	0	0	0

Coaching information
Club
Years	Team	Gms	W	D	L	W%
	"Spektr" Sports School

Rinat Akhmedovich Shamsutdinov (Ринат Ахмедович Шамсутдинов) (born on 23 January 1971, in Kazan), is a Russian rugby league footballer, Master of Sports of Russia and rugby union coach. He was presented with Excellence in physical culture and sports of the Republic of Tatarstan.

== Playing career ==
During his career, he played for Strela Kazan, six-times Russian rugby league champion, winner of the 2002 Russian Cup. He played for the team in the 2005 Challenge Cup. As part of the Russian national team which ended runner-up at the 2001 and 2002 European Championship among students at the Central Stadium in Kazan. Chamsoutdinov also played three matches at the 2000 World Cup. He also represented Russia on a 2004 tour of New Zealand and at the 2005 European Nations Cup.

Currently he is a rugby union trainer, coaching the "Spektr" Sports School kids' team. In 2017 he was recognized as the best team sports coach in Kazan. He lives in the village of Salmachi and his son plays for the Kazan rugby union team.

In 2013, Shamsutdinov was beaten by bailiffs: they tried to forcefully evict him from the townhouse, which was allegedly built illegally and was subject to demolition.
