= Mikael Andersson =

Mikael Andersson may refer to:

- Mikael Andersson (footballer, born 1972), Swedish football player
- Mikael Andersson (footballer, born 1978), Swedish footballer, played for Sandjeford in the 2006 Norwegian Football Cup Final
- Mikael Andersson (ice hockey, born 1959), from Jukkasjärvi, Sweden, retired ice hockey player
- Mikael Andersson (ice hockey, born 1966), from Malmö, Sweden, is a retired ice hockey right winger

== See also ==
- Michael Andersson (disambiguation)
- Michael Anderson (disambiguation)
