= Mohammed Abbas (rugby league) =

Australian-Lebanese rugby league footballer

Personal information
- Born: Sydney, New South Wales, Australia

Playing information
- Position: Wing
Representative
Years	Team	Pld	T	G	FG	P
1999–00	Lebanon	3	0	0	0	0

Mohammed Abbas is a former Lebanon international rugby league footballer who represented Lebanon at the 2000 World Cup.

== Background ==
Abbas was born in Sydney, New South Wales, Australia.

== Playing career ==
Abbas played for the Canterbury-Bankstown Bulldogs, playing alongside the likes of Hazem El Masri and Brent Sherwin in their 1998 President's Cup side. He played for Lebanon in their 1999 World Cup qualification matches and was named in their 2000 World Cup squad.
