= Andrey Dumalkin =

Former Russia international rugby league footballer

Personal information
- Full name: Andrey Dumalkin
- Born: 3 November 1972 (age 53) Moscow, Russian SFSR, Soviet Union

Playing information
- Position: Second-row
Club
| Years | Team | Pld | T | G | FG | P |
|---|---|---|---|---|---|---|
| | RC Lokomotiv Moscow |
Representative
| Years | Team | Pld | T | G | FG | P |
| | Russia |

Coaching information
Club
| Years | Team | Gms | W | D | L | W% |
| | RC Zelenograd |
- As of 10 February 2021

Andrey Ivanovich Dumalkin (born 3 November 1972) is a Russian former rugby league footballer who played as a second-row for RC Lokomotiv Moscow in the Championship of Russia competition. He is the current coach of the Russia national beach rugby team and coach of SSHOR No. 111, He previously coached RC Zelenograd and is a Master of Sports of Russia.

== Career ==
Dumalkin played in the second row in rugby league. He has won the Championship of Russia and the Russian Cup for RC Lokomotiv Moscow many times. He took part in the 2000 Rugby League World Cup as part of the Russian national team . Of his first 15 rugby league seasons, he played 14 for Lokomotiv.

== Coaching career ==
As a coach, he is known for coaching RC Zelenograd in the Russian rugby championship, with which he won the Moscow championship in 2013. He is a Member of the Bureau of the Rugby Union of Russia.

== Background ==
Andrey Dumalkin was born in Moscow, USSR.
