= Rustem Garifullin =

Russian rugby league footballer (born 1967)

Personal information
- Full name: Rustem Mukhametovich Garifullin
- Born: 3 March 1967 (age 59) Russia

Playing information
- Position: Second-row
Club
| Years | Team | Pld | T | G | FG | P |
|---|---|---|---|---|---|---|
| | Starye Pertsy (Volga Region) |
Representative
| Years | Team | Pld | T | G | FG | P |
| 2000 | Russia | 1 | 0 | 0 | 0 | 0 |

Rustem Mukhametovich Garifullin (Рустем Мухаметович Гарифуллин) (born 3 March 1967 in Kazan) is a Russian rugby league footballer. He plays for a senior team called "Sedye Barsy", and is currently the acting vice-president of Energya, a rugby club from Kazan. He represented Russia in the 2000 World Cup.

== Playing career ==
Known for his performances for Strela Kazan, a many-times champion and winner of the Russian Cup [5]. Garifullin was selected for the Russian squad at the 2000 World Cup in the United Kingdom. He played in one match, starting at second row in Russia's 4–110 loss to Australia.

His son, Islam Garifullin, is a professional rugby player from the Energya team, previously he played for the KSPEU; Garifullin is also a licensed rugby referee.
