= Muhamed Chahal =

Lebanese rugby league footballer

Mohamed Chahal
Personal information
- Height: 190 cm (6 ft 3 in)
- Weight: 96 kg (212 lb; 15 st 2 lb)

Playing information
- Position: Fullback
Club
Years	Team	Pld	T	G	FG	P
1998–1999	Canterbury Bulldogs
Representative
Years	Team	Pld	T	G	FG	P
1998–2007	Lebanon	14	11	4		52

Mohamed Chahal is a Lebanese rugby league footballer who represented Lebanon national rugby league team in the 2000 World Cup.

== Playing career ==
Mohamed Chahal is an international Australian-born rugby league footballer who represented Lebanon as a fullback. Chahal's form challenged team mate and Canterbury superstar Hazem El Masri for the fullback spot in the 1999 World Cup qualifiers in France, the USA and the World Cup in England and Wales. Chahal played tests for Lebanon between 1998 and 2006 and the 2003-2004 Rugby League World Sevens tournaments in Sydney, Australia. Chahal returned from a stint in France to a short career at the Canterbury Bulldogs and their feeder Sydney Bulls club in the New South Wales Jim Beam Cup until 2007.
