= Jimi Bolakoro =

Fiji international rugby league footballer

Personal information
- Born: Fiji

Playing information

Rugby league
- Position: Centre
Representative
| Years | Team | Pld | T | G | FG | P |
|---|---|---|---|---|---|---|
| 2000 | Fiji | 1 | 0 | 0 | 0 | 0 |

Rugby union
- Position: Centre
Club
| Years | Team | Pld | T | G | FG | P |
|---|---|---|---|---|---|---|
| | Colombo H&FC |

Jimi Bolakoro is a Fijian rugby footballer who represented Fiji in rugby league at the 2000 World Cup.

== Playing career ==
Bolakoro represented Fiji at the 2000 Rugby League World Cup, playing one match at centre.

Bolakoro moved to Sri Lanka in 2003 and aimed to represent the country in rugby union. He joined the Colombo Hockey and Football Club and played in Sri Lanka's domestic competition.
