= Chris Hurter =

South African rugby league footballer

Personal information
- Born: South Africa

Playing information
- Position: Hooker
Representative
Years	Team	Pld	T	G	FG	P
2000	South Africa	2	0	0	0	0

Chris Hurter is a South African rugby league footballer who represented South Africa in the 2000 World Cup.
