= Joe Lichaa =

Australian rugby league footballer

Personal information
- Born: 23 May 1980 (age 46) Sydney, New South Wales, Australia

Playing information
- Position: Lock
Club
Years	Team	Pld	T	G	FG	P
2006	South Sydney	2	0	0	0	0
Representative
Years	Team	Pld	T	G	FG	P
2000–02	Lebanon	4	0	0	0	0

Joe Lichaa (Arabic: جو ليشا) is an Australian former rugby league footballer who represented Lebanon in the 2000 Rugby League World Cup.

In 2006 he played in two National Rugby League matches for the South Sydney Rabbitohs.
