= Roger Matakamikamica =

Fiji international rugby league & union footballer

Personal information
- Born: Fiji

Playing information

Rugby league
Representative
Years	Team	Pld	T	G	FG	P
2000	Fiji	1	0	0	0	0

Rugby union
Club
Years	Team	Pld	T	G	FG	P
	Fraser Coast Mariners

Roger Matakamikamica is a Fijian rugby league footballer who represented Fiji in the 2000 World Cup.

He later played rugby union for the Fraser Coast Mariners in the Sunshine Coast Rugby Union competition.
