= Michael Giorgas =

Greece & Russia international rugby league footballer

Personal information
- Born: Australia

Playing information
- Position: Prop, Second-row
Club
| Years | Team | Pld | T | G | FG | P |
|---|---|---|---|---|---|---|
| | Logan City |
Representative
| Years | Team | Pld | T | G | FG | P |
| 1998–2000 | Russia | 1 | 0 | 0 | 0 | 0 |
| 2003 | Greece | 1 | 0 | 0 | 0 | 0 |

Michael Giorgas is an Australian-born Russian rugby league footballer who represented Russia in the 2000 World Cup. He was named on the bench in Russia's 4-110 loss to Australia.

== Career ==
In the Australian championship, he is known for his performance for the Logan City club. He opted for representing Russia at international level due to his Russian heritage, and in total, seven Australian players were included in the Russia national team. He took part at the qualifiers for the 2000 World Cup and played only the match during the finals. He also represented Greece in 2003.
