= Vaine Kino =

Playing information
Representative
Years	Team	Pld	T	G	FG	P
2000	Cook Islands	1	0	0	0	0

Vaine Kino is a former professional rugby league and rugby union footballer who played in the 2000s and 2010s. He played representative level rugby league (RL) for Cook Islands, and at club level for the Sydney Bulls.

== Rugby league career ==
Kino won a cap for Cook Islands in the 2000 Rugby League World Cup.

Kino later played for the Sydney Bulls in the Metropolitan Cup, kicking a field goal to ensure the Bulls won their first ever title.

== Rugby union career ==
As of 2010, Kino played rugby union in New South Wales.
