= Monah Elahmad =

Lebanon international rugby league footballer

Personal information
- Born: 28 January 1977 (age 49) Sydney, New South Wales, Australia

Playing information
- Position: Prop
Club
Years	Team	Pld	T	G	FG	P
2001	Sydney Roosters	1	0	0	0	0
Representative
Years	Team	Pld	T	G	FG	P
2000–02	Lebanon	3	0	0	0	0

Monah Elahmad is an Australian former professional rugby league footballer who has once represented Lebanon at the 2000 Rugby League World Cup.

== Background ==
Elahmad was born in Sydney, New South Wales, Australia.

== Playing career ==
While playing for the Cabramatta Two Blues, Elahmad represented Lebanon at the 2000 World Cup, playing in two matches.

In 2001 he played his only National Rugby League match, playing for the Sydney Roosters.

In 2002 he moved clubs, joining the Parramatta Eels. At the end of the year he again represented Lebanon, playing in a match against France. He was released by Parramatta at the end of the season.

He played for Lebanon at the 2003 World Sevens and trialled for the South Sydney Rabbitohs. However he ended up spending the season with the Newtown Jets.

As of 2012 Elahmad played for the Auburn Warriors in the Bundaberg Red Cup.
