= Liam Tallon =

Ireland international rugby league player

Personal information
- Full name: Liam Tallon
- Born: 7 April 1976 (age 50) Australia

Playing information
- Position: Centre
Club
Years	Team	Pld	T	G	FG	P
199?–00	Norths Devils
2001	Dewsbury Rams	9	2	0	0	8
	Total	9	2	0	0	8
Representative
Years	Team	Pld	T	G	FG	P
2000	Ireland	1	0	0	0	0

Liam Tallon is a former rugby league centre. Tallon was an Ireland international and played at the 2000 Rugby League World Cup, replacing Gary Connolly who missed the call due to injury. Prior to being called up by Ireland, Tallon had been playing with the Brisbane Norths in Queensland.

== Background ==
Tallon was born in Australia.
