= Konstantin Zhiltsov =

Russian footballer

Personal information
- Full name: Konstantin Vladimirovich Zhiltsov
- Date of birth: 19 January 1983 (age 43)
- Place of birth: Gorky, Russian SFSR
- Height: 1.77 m (5 ft 9 1/2 in)
- Position: Defender

Senior career*
| Years | Team | Apps | (Gls) |
| 2001 | FC Lokomotiv Nizhny Novgorod | 6 | (0) |
| 2001–2003 | FC Torpedo Pavlovo | 65 | (1) |
| 2004 | FC Dynamo Bryansk | 1 | (0) |
| 2004 | FC Elektronika Nizhny Novgorod | 12 | (0) |
| 2005 | FC Lokomotiv-NN Nizhny Novgorod | 24 | (2) |
| 2006 | FC Lokomotiv Kaluga | 30 | (4) |
| 2007–2008 | FC Spartak Kostroma | 52 | (2) |
| 2009 | FC Nizhny Novgorod | 22 | (2) |
| 2010 | FC Sokol Saratov | 17 | (6) |
| 2011 | FC Gornyak Uchaly | 9 | (0) |
| 2011–2012 | FC Sokol Saratov | 20 | (1) |
| 2012–2013 | FC Khimik Dzerzhinsk | 20 | (1) |
| 2013–2015 | FC Spartak Kostroma | 54 | (3) |
| 2015–2017 | FC Olimpiyets Nizhny Novgorod | 22 | (0) |
- * Club domestic league appearances and goals

Konstantin Vladimirovich Zhiltsov (Russian: Константин Владимирович Жильцов; born 19 January 1983) is a former Russian professional football player.

== Club career ==
Zhiltsov played 3 seasons in the Russian Football National League with FC Lokomotiv Nizhny Novgorod, FC Dynamo Bryansk and FC Nizhny Novgorod.
