= Richard Louw =

South African rugby league footballer

Personal information
- Born: South Africa

Playing information
- Position: Prop
Representative
Years	Team	Pld	T	G	FG	P
2000	South Africa	1	0	0	0	0

Richard Louw is a South African rugby league footballer who represented his country in the 2000 World Cup.

Louw later played for the London Skolars in Championship 1 and the Challenge Cup in 2007 and 2008.
