= Max Fala =

Samoan rugby league footballer

Playing information
Representative
Years	Team	Pld	T	G	FG	P
2000	Samoa	3	0	0	0	0

Max Fala is a Samoan rugby league footballer who represented Saoma at the 2000 World Cup.

== Playing career ==
A Northcote Tigers player in the Auckland Rugby League competition, Fala was selected for the Samoa side in 2000 for the World Cup. He played in three matches for Samoa, coming off the bench.
