= Evgeny Klebanov =

Russian rugby union player & coach

Eugene Klebanov
- Born: Evgeny Isayevich Klebanov; 9 February 1954 (age 72)
- University: Moscow Regional State Institute of Physical Culture

Rugby union career
Senior career
Years	Team	Apps	(Points)
1975-76	Moscow		
1976-	Fili Moscow		
-1982	RC Lokomotiv Moscow		
Coaching career
- Years: Team
- 1983-1988: RC Lokomotiv Moscow
- 1984: Moscow
- 1988: USSR B
- 1990-1991: USSR
- Rugby league career

Coaching information
Representative
Years	Team	Gms	W	D	L	W%
1992–2012	Russia

Evgeny Isayevich Klebanov (Евге́ний Иса́евич Клеба́нов), known also as Eugene Klebanov (born in Moscow, on 9 February 1954), is a Russian former rugby union player, league coach, Master of Sports of the USSR, Merited Coach of Russia in rugby, five-times winner of the Moscow rugby championship and runner-up at the USSR rugby championship in 1990. He has coached for a long time Russia at the 2003, 2004 and 2005 European Nations Cups and other international tournaments. Klebanov also trained over 100 Masters of Sports of the USSR and Russia. Currently he is the head coach of the National Rosbol Federation of Russia and the Superball Academy.

== Biography ==
Born on 9 February 1954, He graduated from the Moscow Regional State Institute of Physical Culture with a degree in trainer-teacher (Department of Sports Games) in 1989.

== Career ==
Between 1975 and 1975, Klebanov played for the Moscow representative team, later, he played for between 1976 and 1982 for Fili and Lokomotiv.

== Coaching career ==
He began his coaching career in 1983, becoming a coach of the Moscow team of Masters and for Lokomotiv, leading the latter until 2012. Under his leadership, the club won the USSR Rugby Championship in 1983, and in 1991 entered the professional Rugby League Championship and won the title of Russian champions 12 times and the Russian Cup 8 times.

In 1984, Klebanov was appointed head coach of the Moscow rugby team. Later, in 1988, he became the coach of the USSR B national team. Since 1990, he was appointed coach of the USSR national team, between 1992 and 2012 he coached the Russia national rugby league team. The team played at the in 1995 Emerging Nations Tournament and 2000 Rugby League World Cup.

In 2006 he served as the team's Manager in the 2008 Rugby League World Cup qualifying matches.

In 2009 he was the CEO and Head Coach of RC Lokomotiv Moscow when the club decided to switch to rugby union.
