= Alfred Songoro =

PNG international rugby league footballer

Personal information
- Born: 10 January 1975 (age 50)

Playing information
- Position: Wing, Centre
Club
Years	Team	Pld	T	G	FG	P
1999	Wakefield Trinity Wildcats	13	4	0	0	12
≤2007–≥07	Union Treiziste Catalan
	Total	13	4	0	0	12
Representative
Years	Team	Pld	T	G	FG	P
<1999–2001	Papua New Guinea	6	0	0	0	0

Alfred Songoro (born 10 January 1975) is a former professional rugby league footballer who played in the 1990s and 2000s. He played at representative level for Papua New Guinea, and at club level for the Wakefield Trinity Wildcats and Union Treiziste Catalan, as a wing or centre. Songoro was a Brisbane Broncos junior, playing for their Colts side in 1993 and 1994. In 1994, he represented the Queensland Under 19 side.

== International honours ==
Alfred Songoro won caps for Papua New Guinea in 2000 against Australia, in the 2000 World Cup against France, South Africa, Tonga, and Wales, and in 2001 against Australia.
