= Hendrik Mulder =

South African rugby league footballer

Personal information
- Born: South Africa

Playing information
Representative
Years	Team	Pld	T	G	FG	P
2000	South Africa	3	0	0	0	0

Hendrik Mulder is a South African rugby league footballer who represented South Africa national rugby league team in the 2000 World Cup.
