= Fourcade Abasse =

France international rugby league footballer (b.1979)

Personal information
- Born: 21 November 1979 (age 46) France
- Height: 175 cm (5 ft 9 in)
- Weight: 81 kg (12 st 11 lb)

Playing information
- Position: Wing
Club
Years	Team	Pld	T	G	FG	P
2007–10	Saint-Gaudens Bears	74	17	0	0	68
Representative
Years	Team	Pld	T	G	FG	P
2000–04	France	6	2	0	0	8

Fourcade Abasse is a French rugby league footballer who represented France in the 2000 World Cup.

He played for the Saint-Gaudens Bears club.
