= Eben Goddard =

Australian rugby league footballer

Personal information
- Born: Australia

Playing information
- Position: Second-row
Representative
Years	Team	Pld	T	G	FG	P
2000	Lebanon	1	0	0	0	0

Eben Goddard is a former Lebanon international rugby league footballer who represented Lebanon at the 2000 World Cup.

== Background ==
Goddard was born in Sydney, Australia.

== Playing career ==
Goddard played in the lower grades for the St. George-Illawarra Dragons club. In 2000 he was selected to represent Lebanon in the World Cup through his ancestry. He played in one game at the tournament. In 2002 he moved to the Easts Tigers in the Queensland Cup before retiring.

== Later years ==
Goddard now works as a personal trainer in Brisbane, Queensland.
