= Viktor Nechaev =

Viktor Valeryevich Nechaev (Виктор Валерьевич Нечаев; born 22 September 1972 in Moscow, Soviet Union) is a Russian rugby league footballer and rugby union coach, who played for RC Lokomotiv Moscow in the Championship of Russia competition. He is the coach of the Olymp club and of the Youth Sports School of Lokomotiv.

He first played for Slava Moscow and won nine Russian rugby league titles as part of RC Lokomotiv Moscow. He is a Master of Sports of Russia and graduated from the State Central Institute of Physical Culture of the Order of Lenin. As part of the Russian national side, he participated in the 2000 World Cup.
