= Mikhail Mitrofanov =

Russian rugby league player (born 1977)

Personal information
- Full name: Mikhail Viktorovich Mitrofanov
- Born: circa 1977; Kazan, Russia
- Height: 186 cm (6 ft 1 in)
- Weight: 100 kg (220 lb; 15 st 10 lb)

Playing information
- Position: Fullback, Wing
Club
Years	Team	Pld	T	G	FG	P
	Sedye Barsi
Representative
Years	Team	Pld	T	G	FG	P
2000	Russia	3	0	3	0	6

Mikhail Viktorovich Mitrofanov (Михаил Викторович Митрофанов), (born in Kazan, circa 1977) is a Russian rugby league footballer, ice hockey player. He is a Master of Sports of Russia of international class in rugby.

== Career ==
As a child he played ice hockey, later switched to rugby union. Known for his performances for Strela Kazan [4]. Five-times champion of Russia, runner-up at the European Rugby League among students as part of the national team of Tatarstan (2001), three times participant in international tournaments within the Rugby League World Cup. In 2000 he played for the Russian national rugby league team at the World Cup in England, having played three matches. In the match against Fiji, he scored a try, and in the match against England he scored two penalties. In 2001, at the European Championship among students, he became the top scorer in the Tatarstan team, which lost to England 34-16 in the final, and in the final in the first half the team started a massive fight with the British. In 2011, he played for the Russian national beach rugby team. Currently, he plays for the senior rugby team "Sedye Barsy" and the ice hockey team Torpedo from Kazan in the Night Hockey League.
