= Alex Krewanty =

PNG international rugby league footballer

Personal information
- Born: 12 April 1975 (age 51) Port Moresby, Papua New Guinea
- Height: 185 cm (6 ft 1 in)
- Weight: 105 kg (16 st 7 lb)

Playing information

Rugby league
- Position: Fullback, Wing, Centre
Club
Years	Team	Pld	T	G	FG	P
1996–05	Port Moresby Vipers
Representative
Years	Team	Pld	T	G	FG	P
2000	Papua New Guinea	5	1	0	0	4

Rugby union
Representative
Years	Team	Pld	T	G	FG	P
2002	Papua New Guinea 7s
- Source: As of 25 November 2023
- Relatives: Arnold Krewanty (brother)

Alex Krewanty is a Papua New Guinean rugby league footballer who represented Papua New Guinea in the 2000 World Cup.

He is the younger brother of former International, Arnold Krewanty.

Apart from Rugby League, Krewanty also played in the Hong Kong Sevens for PNG Pukpuks in the 2002 Hong Kong Sevens.

== Playing career ==
Krewanty played five test matches for Papua New Guinea in 2000, including all four matches at the 2000 World Cup.

Krewanty played in the NSW Metropolitant Cup Competition and also had a stint with First Division Bankstown Canterbury Bulldogs

Krewanty also played in the Super League Nines in Fiji for the PNG Kumuls

Krewanty played for the Port Moresby Vipers in the SP Cup and also in the Queensland Bundy Cup Competition

Alex and his brother Julius also played for the South Tweed Koalas in the Gold Coast Group 18 Competition

.

Krewanty was juggling his Teaching and Rugby League Career all at once.
