= Bilal Najjarin (rugby league) =

Australian rugby league footballer

Personal information
- Born: Australia

Playing information
- Position: Wing
Representative
Years	Team	Pld	T	G	FG	P
2000–2002	Lebanon	2	0	0	0	0

Bilal Najjarin is an Australian former rugby league footballer who represented Lebanon at the 2000 Rugby League World Cup.

== Background ==
Najjarin was born in Australia.

== Playing career ==
He also played in a test match against France in 2002.
