= Andrew Norman (rugby league) =

PNG international rugby league footballer & coach

Personal information
- Born: 22 September 1972 (age 52); Papua New Guinea

Playing information
Representative
Years	Team	Pld	T	G	FG	P
2000	Papua New Guinea	5	0	0	0	0

Andrew Norman is a Papua New Guinean rugby league footballer and coach who represented Papua New Guinea in the 2000 World Cup.
