= Niko Vakararawa =

Fijian rugby league footballer

Personal information
- Born: Fiji

Playing information
- Position: Wing, Centre
Representative
Years	Team	Pld	T	G	FG	P
2000	Fiji	1	0	0	0	0

Niko Vakararawa is a Fijian rugby league footballer who represented Fiji in the 2000 World Cup.

== Playing career ==
Vakararawa played in the Group 1 Rugby League competition, with the Lismore Marist Brothers Rams. In 2005 the competition merged, becoming the Northern Rivers Regional Rugby League competition.

In 2012, after two years off, he returned to the sport, re-joining the Lismore Marist Brothers club. Later that year he was named in the Northern Rivers representative side.
