= Jaco Webb =

South African rugby footballer

Personal information
- Born: South Africa

Playing information

Rugby union
- Position: Number 8
Club
Years	Team	Pld	T	G	FG	P
1998	Pretoria
2001	Falcons
	Total	0	0	0	0	0

Rugby league
- Position: Second-row
Club
Years	Team	Pld	T	G	FG	P
1997–2000	Johannesburg Scorpions
Representative
Years	Team	Pld	T	G	FG	P
1995–2000	South Africa	3	0	0	0	0

Jaco Webb is a South African rugby footballer who represented his country in rugby league at the 2000 World Cup.

== Playing career ==
Webb played rugby league for the Johannesburg Scorpions and first represented South Africa in 1995 and again in 1997. He again played for the national side in 2000, coming off the bench for one game at the World Cup.

Webb also played rugby union, playing for Pretoria in 1998 and the Falcons in 2001.
