= Raymond Ruaporo =

Playing information

Rugby league
Representative
Years	Team	Pld	T	G	FG	P
2000	Cook Islands	1	0	0	0	0

Rugby union
Club
Years	Team	Pld	T	G	FG	P
2009	Tuggeranong Vikings

Raymond Ruaporo is a former professional rugby league and rugby union footballer who played in the 2000s, and 2010s. He played representative level rugby league (RL) for Cook Islands, and at club level for the Canberra Raiders, and club level rugby union (RU) for the Tuggeranong Vikings.

== Rugby league career ==
Ruaporo won a cap for Cook Islands (RL) in the 2000 Rugby League World Cup.

In 2001 he played for the Canberra Raiders Jersey Flegg side.

== Later years ==
As of 2009, Ruaporo plays rugby union in the New South Wales lower grades, spending 2009 with the Tuggeranong Vikings.
