= Kandy Tamer =

Australian rugby league footballer

Personal information
- Full name: Kandy Tamer
- Born: 1 January 1972 (age 54) Sydney, New South Wales, Australia

Playing information
- Position: Second-row
Club
| Years | Team | Pld | T | G | FG | P |
|---|---|---|---|---|---|---|
| 1994 | Eastern Suburbs | 1 | 0 | 0 | 0 | 0 |
Representative
| Years | Team | Pld | T | G | FG | P |
| 2000 | Lebanon | 3 | 0 | 0 | 0 | 0 |
- Source: As of 23 January 2019

Kandy Tamer is a former Lebanon international rugby league footballer who represented Lebanon at the 2000 World Cup, playing in three matches.

== Background ==
Tamer was born in Tripoli, Lebanon.

== Playing career ==
Tamer played one match for the Eastern Suburbs Roosters in the 1994 NSWRL Premiership.
