= David Luckwell =

Wales international rugby league footballer

Personal information
- Full name: David Luckwell
- Born: 15 January 1975 (age 50)

Playing information
- Position: Prop, Second-row
Club
Years	Team	Pld	T	G	FG	P
1999–02	Hull Kingston Rovers	45	2	0	0	8
2000	Batley Bulldogs	0	0	0	0	0
	Total	45	2	0	0	8
Representative
Years	Team	Pld	T	G	FG	P
1999–00	Wales	3	0	0	0	0
- As of 9 Jun 2021

David Luckwell (born 15 January 1975) is a former professional rugby league footballer who played in the 1990s and 2000s. He played at representative level for Wales, and at club level for Hull Kingston Rovers and Batley Bulldogs, as a prop or second-row.

== Playing career ==
David Luckwell played for Wales at the 2000 Rugby League World Cup.
