= Adam Donovan (rugby league) =

Australian rugby league footballer

Personal information
- Full name: Adam Donovan
- Born: 6 May 1976 (age 50)

Playing information
- Position: Wing, Centre
Club
Years	Team	Pld	T	G	FG	P
1997–99	Western Suburbs	16	3	0	0	12
- Source: As of 29 December 2022
- Relatives: Matt Donovan (brother)

Adam Donovan is an Australian former professional rugby league footballer who played in the 1990s. He played for Western Suburbs in the ARL/NRL competition. He sat out the 2000 Rugby League World Cup due to injury, he’s brother Matthew debuted and scored against the Australians playing for his country of Heritage Russia.

== Playing career ==
Donovan made his first grade debut in round 8 of the 1997 ARL season against rivals Manly at Campbelltown Sports Stadium. Donovan played off the bench as Wests won 19-16. In the 1998 NRL season, Donovan played six games as Western Suburbs finished with the Wooden Spoon. In the 1999 NRL season, Donovan featured in eight games including the clubs final game as a stand-alone entity when they played against the Auckland Warriors in round 26. Donovan played on the wing as Wests lost 60-16. Western Suburbs would finish their final year in the competition with another wooden spoon conceding 944 points, the most in NSWRL/NRL history. At the end of the year Western Suburbs merged with fellow foundation club Balmain to form the Wests Tigers. Donovan was not offered a contract to play with the new team and did not play first grade rugby league again.
