= Anthony Semrani =

Former Lebanon international rugby league footballer

Personal information
- Born: Australia

Playing information
- Position: Hooker
Representative
Years	Team	Pld	T	G	FG	P
2000–2003	Lebanon	6	3	0	0	12

Anthony Semrani is an Australian former rugby league footballer who represented Lebanon at the 2000 Rugby League World Cup.

== Background ==
Semrani was born in Australia.
