= Pavel Kalashkin =

Personal information
- Full name: Pavel Aleksandrovich Kalashkin
- Born: 29 September 1970 (age 55) Kazan, Russia

Playing information
Club
Years	Team	Pld	T	G	FG	P
	Strela Kazan
Representative
Years	Team	Pld	T	G	FG	P
2000	Russia	3	0	0	0	0

Coaching information
Club
Years	Team	Gms	W	D	L	W%
	Russia (beach rugby)

Pavel Aleksandrovich Kalashkin (Павел Александрович Калашкин; born 26 September 1970 in Kazan) is a Russian rugby league footballer and rugby coach, acting as head coach of the Russian national beach rugby team. He is a Master of Sports of Russia.

== Career ==
Known for his performances for Strela Kazan, a many-times champion and winner of the Russian Rugby League Cup. He also represented Russia in the 2000 World Cup. Kalashkin played in all three matches from the bench.

As a coach, he is known for coaching the Kazan rugby club Energya, whose presidency he also held (the club won the FRL-2014 with him), and Strela Kazan. He was also appointed executive director of the Rugby Federation of the Republic of Tatarstan, as well, as organizer of the rugby sevens competitions of the 2013 Summer Universiade.
