= Samu Valelala =

Fijian rugby league footballer

Personal information
- Full name: Samuela Valelala
- Born: Fiji

Playing information
- Position: Prop
Representative
Years	Team	Pld	T	G	FG	P
2000	Fiji	1	0	0	0	0

Samu Valelala is a Fijian rugby league footballer who represented Fiji in the 2000 World Cup.
