= Matt Donovan (Russian rugby league) =

Russian international rugby league footballer

Playing information
- Position: Wing, Centre
Representative
Years	Team	Pld	T	G	FG	P
2000	Russia	2	1	0	0	4
- Relatives: Adam Donovan (brother)

Matt Donovan is a Russian international rugby league footballer who represented Russia at the 2000 Rugby League World Cup. He is noted for scoring Russia's only try in their 110–4 loss to Australia.

== Career ==
Donovan, of Russian descent, represented Russia at the 2000 Rugby League World Cup.
