= Mike Edwards (rugby league) =

US & Wales international rugby league footballer

Personal information
- Full name: Michael Edwards
- Born: 14 April 1974 (age 51)

Playing information
- Position: Wing
Club
Years	Team	Pld	T	G	FG	P
1995	Oldham	2	0	0	0	0
1995–96	Swinton	5	1	0	0	4
	Total	7	1	0	0	4
Representative
Years	Team	Pld	T	G	FG	P
1995	Wales	2	0	0	0	0
1999–06	United States	2	0	0	0	0

Michael Edwards (born 14 April 1974) is a former professional rugby league footballer who played in the 1990s and 2000s. He played at representative level for Wales and United States, and at club level for Oldham and Swinton, as a wing.

== International honours ==
Edwards won two caps for Wales while at Oldham in 1995.
