= Duncan Na'awi =

PNG international rugby league footballer

Personal information
- Born: 23 March 1978 (age 48) Papua New Guinea

Playing information
- Position: Centre, Second-row, Lock
Representative
Years	Team	Pld	T	G	FG	P
2000–2001	Papua New Guinea	8	0	0	0	0

Duncan Na'awi is a Papua New Guinean rugby league footballer who represented Papua New Guinea in the 2000 World Cup.

== Playing career ==
Na'awi played in the Queensland Cup for the Redcliffe Dolphins in 2000 and the Wynnum Manly Seagulls in 2001.

He played eight test matches for Papua New Guinea in those two years, including four at the 2000 World Cup.

In 2009 he played for the Cairns Kangaroos in the Cairns District Rugby League.
