= Craig Cygler =

Russia international rugby league player

Personal information
- Born: Woree, Queensland, Australia

Playing information
- Position: Centre
Club
Years	Team	Pld	T	G	FG	P
1991–00	Cairns Brothers
1993–95	Cairns
1996	Cairns Cyclones
	Total	0	0	0	0	0
Representative
Years	Team	Pld	T	G	FG	P
2000	Russia	2	0	0	0	0

Craig Cygler, mistakenly named as Greg Figler in Russian-language sources (born circa 1973, in Woree) is an Australian-born Russian former rugby league footballer, and currently, an entrepreneur and director of the fuel and energy company NQpetro.

== Junior Playing career ==
Craig began his career at the Kangaroos club, for which he played in 1983–1986 at junior level.

== Senior Playing career ==
Cygler began his senior career playing for Cairns Brothers club in 1991 in the u18 division and made his A grade debut in 1992. He was part of the Cairns Brothers premiership winning side of 2000 in the Cairns District Rugby League competition. He played with Cairns Brothers from 1991 to 2000., beating Kangaroos and scoring a goal. From 1993 to 1995 he played for the Cairns Foley Shield team, and in 1996 made his debut for the Cairns Cyclones in the Queensland Cup.

== Representative Playing career ==
Cygler became one of seven Australian citizens who, thanks to his Russian heritage, received the right to play for the Russian national side at the 2000 Rugby League World Cup. For Russia, he played two matches in the tournament.

== After retirement ==
He is currently the director of the fuel and energy company NQpetro.

== Background ==
Cygler was born in Woree, Australia.
