= Stephen Smith (rugby league) =

Fijian rugby league footballer

Personal information
- Born: Fiji

Playing information
- Position: Five-eighth, Halfback
Representative
Years	Team	Pld	T	G	FG	P
2000	Fiji	2	0	0	0	0

Stephen Smith is a Fijian rugby league footballer who represented Fiji in the 2000 World Cup.

He played club football for the Te Atatu Roosters in the Auckland Rugby League competition.
