= Kalaveti Tuiyabayaba =

Fijian rugby league footballer

Personal information
- Born: Fiji

Playing information
- Position: Scrum-half
Representative
Years	Team	Pld	T	G	FG	P
2000	Fiji	2	0	0	0	0

Kalaveti Tuiyabayaba is a Fijian rugby league footballer who represented Fiji in the 2000 World Cup.
