= Igor Zhiltsov =

Russian rugby league player (born 1966)

Personal information
- Born: circa 1966 Russia

Playing information
Club
Years	Team	Pld	T	G	FG	P
	RC Lokomotiv Moscow
Representative
Years	Team	Pld	T	G	FG	P
2000	Russia	2	0	1	0	2

Igor Zhiltsov (Игорь Жильцов), (born circa 1966) is a Russian rugby league footballer who represented Russia in the 2000 World Cup.

== Career ==
Known for his performances for Lokomotiv, champion and winner of the Russian Cup. He played for the team since the days of the USSR. As a member of the Russia, he played at the 2000 World Cup, He played in two matches at the tournament, coming off the bench in both games. He also made a try against Fiji in the tournament.
