= Peceli Wawavanua =

Fiji international rugby league footballer

Personal information
- Born: Fiji

Playing information
- Position: Hooker
Representative
Years	Team	Pld	T	G	FG	P
2000	Fiji	2	0	0	0	0
- Source: RLP

Peceli Wawavanua (also spelt Wawavamia) is a Fijian former professional rugby league footballer who represented Fiji in the 2000 World Cup.

== Playing career ==
Wawavanua played for Fiji at the 2000 World Cup, making one appearance from the bench and starting the match against England at hooker.

In 2007 he was part of the "Australian Fijian" squad that won the St Mary's sevens tournament.
