= Petr Sokolov =

Russian rugby league footballer

Petr Sokolov (birth unknown) is a Russian rugby league footballer. He played the majority of his professional career for RC Lokomotiv Moscow in the Championship of Russia competition. His preferred position was in the forwards.

== Background ==
Petr Sokolov was born in Moscow, Russia. Outside rugby league, he worked as a second-hand car salesman.

== Playing career ==
Sokolov was selected in the Russian national side at the 2000 World Cup and played in all games for his nation during the competition. He also represented Russia at the 2003 European Nations Cup.
