= Nedol Saleh =

Australian rugby league footballer

Personal information
- Born: Australia

Playing information
- Position: Hooker
Representative
Years	Team	Pld	T	G	FG	P
2000	Lebanon	1	0	0	0	0

Nedol Saleh is a former Lebanon international rugby league footballer who represented Lebanon at the 2000 World Cup.

== Background ==
Saleh was born in Australia.

== Playing career ==
Since then Saleh has played for a variety of clubs in Australia, including the Appin Dogs in 2008 and the Campbelltown City Kangaroos in 2010 in the Group 6 Rugby League competition.
