= Chris Salem =

Former Lebanon international rugby league footballer

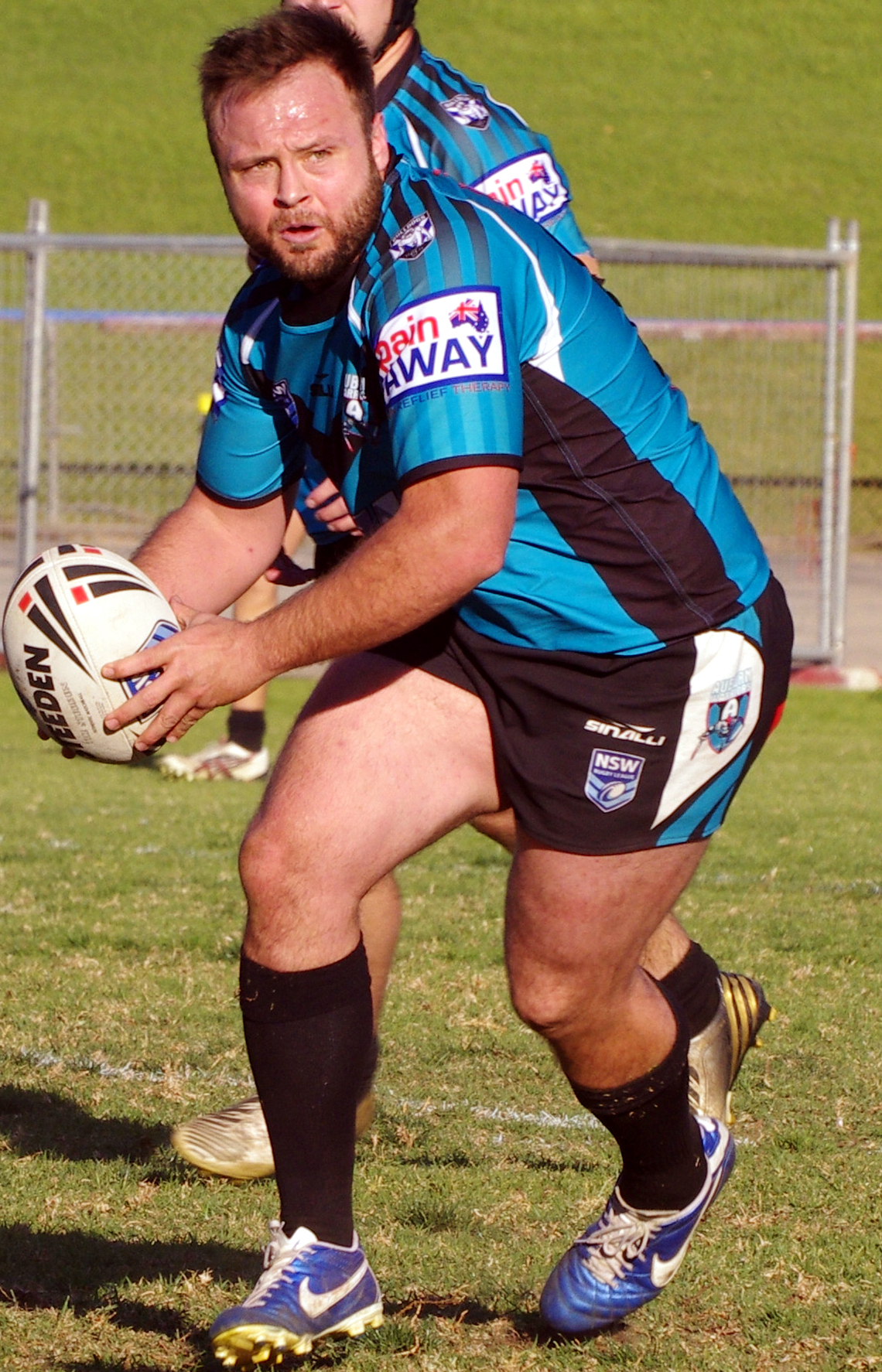

Personal information
- Born: Australia

Playing information
- Position: Lock
Representative
Years	Team	Pld	T	G	FG	P
2000–12	Lebanon	16	6	1	0	26
- Source: As of 27 December 2017

Chris Salem is a former Lebanon international rugby league footballer who represented Lebanon at the 2000 World Cup.

== Background ==
Salem was born in Australia.

== Playing career ==
Salem played 15 matches for Lebanon between 2000 and 2009, including at the 2000 World Cup and captaining the side at the 2009 European Cup.

In 2010, while playing for the Bankstown City Bulls in the Bundaberg Red Cup, Salem tested positive for methylhexaneamine and was immediately suspended. The NSWRL and Australian Sports Anti-Doping Authority later handed him a two-year suspension; he was suspended until 10 September 2012.
