= Atunaisa Vunivalu =

Fijian rugby league footballer

Personal information
- Born: Fiji

Playing information
- Position: Loose forward
Representative
Years	Team	Pld	T	G	FG	P
2000	Fiji	3	3	1	0	14

Atunaisa Vunivalu is a Fijian rugby league footballer who represented Fiji in the 2000 World Cup.

== Playing career ==
Vunivialu played in three matches for Fiji in the 2000 World Cup. He scored a hat-trick against Russia including a 90-metre try, then a record.

In 2008, while playing for the Mango Bay Cowboys in the Fiji National Rugby League Grand Final, Vunivialu punched referee Sale Tubuna. The match was abandoned and he was subsequently suspended for five years.
