= Tabua Cakacaka =

Former Fiji international rugby league footballer

Personal information
- Full name: Tabuanitoga Cakacaka
- Born: 8 March 1977 (age 48)
- Height: 190 cm (6 ft 3 in)
- Weight: 110 kg (17 st 5 lb)

Playing information
- Position: Prop, Hooker
Club
Years	Team	Pld	T	G	FG	P
2004–06	Baroudeurs de Pia XIII
2007–08	York City Knights	1	0	0	0	0
2009–12	Gateshead Thunder
	Total	1	0	0	0	0
Representative
Years	Team	Pld	T	G	FG	P
2000	Fiji	3	1	0	0	4
- As of 22 February 2021

Tabua Cakacaka (born 8 March 1977) is a Fijian former professional rugby league footballer. His position is prop/second row. He left Fiji at the age of 17 years when he was scouted by the South Sydney Rabbitohs. Since then he has held professional contracts in England, Australia and France.

Tabua was well known for scoring in the 2000 World Cup against Australia barnstorming over Steve Renouf.

Tabua finished his career with the Cootamundra Bulldogs.

== Playing career ==
In 2000 he played for Cootamundra in the Group 9 Rugby League competition.

Cakacaka played for the Gateshead Thunder in England, where he co-captained the team in 2008 to become Championship 1 winners. He was also prominent when the 2009 team set a record for reaching the quarter-finals in the Challenge Cup. Previous clubs are SM Pia XIII (Elite Championship, France), Newtown Jets (Australia), Canberra Raiders (NRL, Australia), Cootamunda (Australia), South Sydney Rabbitohs (Australia), and Young RL (Australia).

Hunslet Hawks (England), where he helped the team become the championship 1 winners in the 2010 season.

Playing for Cootamundra Bulldogs in the Group Nine 2013 competition in Australia.

== Representative career ==
He represented Fiji in the 2000 World Cup where he scored one of two tries against eventual winners Australia (Lote Tuqui scored the other). He also set the record as the first try scorer against an unbeaten Australia in 2000.

He represented Fiji in the World Sevens in Sydney in 2003 and captained the Fiji A side to a victory against Malta in 2004. He was also named captain in the Fiji training squad for the 2008 Rugby League World Cup but was not able play in the competition matches.
