= Farasiko Tokarei =

Fijian rugby league footballer

Personal information
- Born: Fiji

Playing information
- Position: Wing
Representative
Years	Team	Pld	T	G	FG	P
2000	Fiji	3	0	0	0	0

Farasiko Tokarei is a Fijian rugby league footballer who represented Fiji national rugby league team in the 2000 World Cup.

In 2000 he played club football for the Tumbarumba Greens in the Group 9 Rugby League competition. In 2003 Tokarei was the player-coach of the Nabua Broncos. After residing in Australia as a resident he won the 2019 Scott Hargreaves Murray Cup with Tumbarumba
