= Vadim Postnikov =

Russian rugby league footballer

Vadim Postnikov (birth unknown) is a Russian rugby league footballer who has played in the 2000s. He has played at representative level for Russia including at the 2000 Rugby League World Cup, and at club level in the Russian Championship for RC Lokomotiv Moscow, as a prop. Early in his career he competed for the Russia national rugby union team.

== Background ==
Vadim Postnikov was born in Moscow, Russia. Known for his performances for the RC Lokomotiv Moscow, a many-times champion of Russia. He was selected for Russia at the 2000 Rugby League World Cup for the 2000 World Cup in England.
