= Jone Kuraduadua =

Fiji international rugby league footballer

Personal information
- Born: Fiji

Playing information
- Position: Wing
Representative
Years	Team	Pld	T	G	FG	P
2000	Fiji	2	1	0	0	4

Jone Kuraduadua is a Fijian former professional rugby league footballer who represented Fiji in the 2000 World Cup.

== Playing career ==
Kuraduadua played club football in Bellingen, New South Wales in Australia, playing for the Bellingen Magpies in the Group 2 Rugby League competition.

Kuraduadua started two games on the wing for Fiji at the 2000 World Cup in Great Britain, Ireland and France. He scored a try in Fiji's 38–12 victory over Russia.
