= Ray Daher =

Australian rugby league footballer

Personal information
- Born: Australia
- Height: 187 cm (6 ft 2 in)
- Weight: 104 kg (229 lb; 16 st 5 lb)

Playing information
- Position: Five-eighth, Lock
Club
Years	Team	Pld	T	G	FG	P
1996–1998	Sydney City Roosters
2002–2002	Parramatta Eels
2003–2003	Lebanon Rugby World Sevens
	Total	0	0	0	0	0
Representative
Years	Team	Pld	T	G	FG	P
1999–2002	Lebanon	4	0	0	0	0

Ray Daher is a former Lebanon international rugby league footballer who represented Lebanon at the 2000 World Cup.

== Background ==
Daher was born in Australia.

== Playing career ==
Ray captained the Lebanese team in the 2003 Rugby league World sevens in Sydney Australia.
