= Peceli Vuniyayawa =

Fijian rugby league footballer

Personal information
- Born: Fiji

Playing information
Representative
Years	Team	Pld	T	G	FG	P
2000	Fiji	2	0	0	0	0

Peceli Vuniyayawa is a Fijian rugby league footballer who represented Fiji in the 2000 World Cup.

== Playing career ==
Vuniyayawa played in two matches for Fiji at the 2000 World Cup. He played club football for Queanbeyan in the Canberra Rugby League competition.
