= Fady Elchad =

Lebanese rugby leader

Fady Elchab
Playing information
- Position: Five-eighth
Representative
Years	Team	Pld	T	G	FG	P
2000	Lebanon	1	0	0	0	0

Fady Elchab is a former professional rugby league footballer who represented Lebanon in the 2000 World Cup.

== Playing career ==
Elchad played in a trial match for Lebanon on 26 August 2000, against the South Sydney Rabbitohs.

He played in one World Cup match, starting at five-eighth against Wales on 2 November 2000.
