= Michael Andersson (rugby league) =

Cook Islander rugby league footballer

Personal information
- Full name: Michael Andersson

Playing information
- Position: Scrum-half
Representative
Years	Team	Pld	T	G	FG	P
2000	Cook Islands	3	0	0	0	0

Michael Andersson is a Cook Islander former professional rugby league footballer who played in the 2000s. He played at representative level for Cook Islands, as a scrum-half.

== International honours ==
Michael Andersson won caps for Cook Islands in the 2000 Rugby League World Cup.
