= Igor Gavrilin (rugby league) =

Russia international rugby league player (born 1971)

Igor Anatolyevich Gavrilin
Personal information
- Born: 14 September 1971 (age 55) Russia

Playing information
- Position: Scrum-half
Club
Years	Team	Pld	T	G	FG	P
	RC Lokomotiv Moscow
Representative
Years	Team	Pld	T	G	FG	P
2000	Russia	2
- As of 26 October 2026

Igor Anatolyevich Gavrilin (born 14 September 1971 in Moscow, Russia) is a Russian rugby league footballer and rugby union coach who plays as centre. He is currently the acting coach of the Adrenalin rugby union club from Tyumen (sometimes acting as a playing coach) and head coach of the Tyumen region Rugby Union.

He is known for his performances for RC Lokomotiv Moscow in the Championship of Russia competition, five-times champion of Russia. Gavrilin has also represented the Russian national side on several occasions, most notably at the 2000 World Cup. After completing his playing career in the mid-2000s, he took up teaching and coaching. Works as a physical education teacher at school №34 and forms the rugby team "T-34" on the basis of the school. Since 2010 he has been coaching the Tyumen-based club Adrenalin. In 2013 he announced the holding of the first rugby tournament in Tyumen.
