= Mesake Navugona =

Fijian rugby footballer

Personal information
- Born: Fiji

Playing information
Representative
Years	Team	Pld	T	G	FG	P
2000	Fiji	1	0	0	0	0

Mesake Navugona is a Fijian rugby footballer who represented Fiji at rugby league in the 2000 World Cup.
