= Alexandr Lysenkov =

Russian rugby league footballer (born 1973)

Alexandr Lysenkov (Александр Лысенков ) (born in Moscow, circa 1973) is a Russian rugby league footballer who plays as a prop for RC Lokomotiv Moscow in the Championship of Russia competition.

== Career ==
As a child, he played football at the sports school of the Dynamo Moscow. He took up rugby under the guidance of Shamil Akbulatov. In his youth he was a bully, participated in numerous fights and sometimes stole cars, selling them. He made his debut in the first team of Lokomotiv in 1988 at the age of 15 as a rugby union player in a match against Aviator Kyiv, later took up rugby league. He was included in the Russian national side for the 2000 World Cup and has been a regular player in the national set up ever since. [3]. He spent one match in the tournament. Many times champion of Russia, he finished his career in 2009 after a series of injuries.

== Background ==
Alexandr Lysenkov was born in Moscow, Russia.
