= Etuate Vakatawa =

Fijian rugby league footballer

Personal information
- Born: Fiji

Playing information
- Position: Prop, Second-row
Representative
Years	Team	Pld	T	G	FG	P
2000	Fiji	3	0	0	0	0

Etuate Vakatawa is a Fijian rugby league footballer who represented Fiji in the 2000 Rugby League World Cup.

He played club football for the Tumbarumba Greens in the Group 9 Rugby League competition.
