= Sami Chamoun =

Australian rugby league footballer

Personal information
- Full name: Sami Chamoun
- Born: 29 April 1975 (age 50) Sydney, Australia

Playing information
- Position: Prop
Club
Years	Team	Pld	T	G	FG	P
1998	Illawarra Steelers	5	0	0	0	0
Representative
Years	Team	Pld	T	G	FG	P
1999–00	Lebanon	4	0	0	0	0

Sami Chamoun (born 29 April 1975) is an Australian former rugby league footballer who represented Lebanon at the 2000 Rugby League World Cup.

== Playing career ==
Chamoun played for the Illawarra Steelers in the inaugural 1998 season of the National Rugby League competition. He played in five matches, starting four at prop.

Chamoun played for Lebanon in 1999 and 2000, helping Lebanon to qualify for the World Cup in 1999 and playing at the tournament in 2000. Chamoun was injured in a World Cup match against the Cook Islands but refused to leave the field and helped his team to a 22-all draw.

Chamoun became the 211th and final recognised Illawarra Steeler making his debut in Round 17 of 1998 against the Warriors.

In 2002 Chamoun played in the NSWRL First Division for the Balmain Tigers.

== Post playing ==
Chamoun established E Group Security in late 2004. The business boasts more than 1000 staff and provides security and cleaning services to more than 200 clients, which include the NSW government and the City of Sydney. It also does work for a number of other NRL teams, including the Wests Tigers, Penrith Panthers, Sydney Roosters and Newcastle Knights. It also counts the NRL and Parramatta Stadium among its clients.
