= Paul Khoury (rugby league) =

Australian rugby league footballer

Personal information
- Born: 1 July 1977 (age 49) Sydney, New South Wales, Australia

Playing information
- Position: Halfback
Club
Years	Team	Pld	T	G	FG	P
1999	Sydney City	3	0	0	0	0
Representative
Years	Team	Pld	T	G	FG	P
1999–2008	Lebanon	5	0	0	0	0

Paul Khoury (Arabic: باول الخوري) is a former Lebanon international rugby league footballer who represented Lebanon at the 2000 World Cup.

== Background ==
Khoury was born in Sydney, New South Wales, Australia.

== Playing career ==
Khoury played for the Sydney City Roosters in the National Rugby League. In 1999 he represented Lebanon, being named man of the match when they defeated the United States to qualify for the 2000 World Cup. He went on to be named in Lebanon's World Cup squad and last played for Lebanon in 2008.
