= Sydney Bulls =

Defunct Australian semi-pro rugby league club, based in Sydney, NSW

Sydney Bulls RLFC
Club information
- Full name: Sydney Bulls Rugby League Football Club
- Colours: Black; Green; Red
- Founded: 1999; 27 years ago
- Exited: 2009; 17 years ago

Former details
- Ground: Bass Hill, New South Wales
- Competition: Jim Beam Cup, New South Wales Cup
- NSW Cup: 1 (2009)

The Sydney Bulls were a rugby league team based in the suburb of Bass Hill in south-western Sydney. Founded in 1999, the club was formed by Lebanese-Australian players and businessmen who were involved in the 1997 Lebanon Rugby League World Sevens side. Since 2000, the Bulls competed in the semi-professional Metropolitan Cup and, since its inception in 2003, the NSWRL Jim Beam Cup competition in NSW, Australia. Their colours are black, white green and red. They were included in the NSW Cup for 2008-2009 and acted as a feeder club for the Canterbury-Bankstown Bulldogs under the name of the Bankstown City Bulls. The Sydney Bulls folded at the end of the 2009 season.

== Metropolitan Cup/NSWRL Jim Beam Cup ==
Founded in 1999, the Sydney Bulls found success early in their history winning the last Metropolitan Cup in their third season, 2002.

Since the competition was reorganised into the NSWRL Jim Beam Cup in 2003 the Bulls have appeared in four of the five Grand Finals, winning in both 2004 (defeating defending premiers The Entrance Tigers) and 2006 (defeating Newtown Jets). In 2005 the Bulls were defeated by Windsor Wolves in the season decider, and in 2007 30–20 by The Entrance Tigers.

The club then formed a partnership with the Canterbury-Bankstown Bulldogs in 2008 to play as their reserve grade side in the state's premier open age competition, the NSW Cup. Renamed as the Bankstown City Bulls, the club won the 2009 NSW Cup title with a 32-0 shutout of the Balmain Tigers.

The Bulls folded at the end of the 2009 season, after the Canterbury-Bankstown club decided to enter a standalone reserves team in 2010. The Bulldogs won the next two NSW Cup titles, meaning that counting their premiership during the partnership with the Bulls, the team won a hat-trick of successive premierships.

== See also ==
- NSW Cup
- Jim Beam Cup
- Canterbury-Bankstown Bulldogs
