= Kazan Arrows =

Russian rugby (league & union) club, based in Kazan

Club information
- Full name: Strela Kazan Rugby Club
- Founded: 1989

Current details
- Competition: Russian Championship

Kazan Arrows, sometimes called Strela Kazan, are a rugby league and rugby union club from Kazan, Tatarstan in Russia. They were formed in 1989 and play in the Russian Championship, the top-tier of rugby league in Russia. Since late 2009 they have decided to run their senior team as a rugby union team

== Russian Championship ==
They won their first piece of silverware in 1993, and from 1995 through to 1999 became the best club in Russia having won the Russian Championship in each of those years. In 2000 they had a bad season but returned in 2001 to retrieve their trophy. But they then lost it again in 2002.

== Playing in England ==
Tour logo, 2002.

In 1998, they went on tour around Great Britain and were hosted by the London Skolars. During the tour, they also played the Rugby League Conference Runners Up Leicester Phoenix at Saffron Lane. They then hosted the Skolars in 1999.

In 2002, the club took part in 'The Damart Russian Tour', a tour of England with RC Lokomotiv Moscow. The team played the Bradford Bulls in front of 2,000 at Odsal, losing 86-14 and conceding 15 tries, followed by a visit to Craven Park to play Hull Kingston Rovers, losing 40-10 and having players sent off and sin binned after a fight broke out between the players of both teams in the second half.

Also in 2002, and in 2003 they competed in the York International 9s tournament. They were beaten by French team Lézignan Sangliers in 2002, having won their quarter-final match.

== Challenge Cup ==
Home shirt with traditional green and red colours.

The team frequently made an appearance in the Rugby League Challenge Cup and alongside fellow Russian club Locomotive Moscow, they became the first Russian clubs to take part in the competition in 2001. In 2005 they lost 62–14 against the Keighley Cougars in Round 3 of the competition. In 2007 they were beaten by Thornhill Trojans 38–20 in Round 2.

== Switch to rugby union ==
The advent of rugby sevens in the Olympics caused the Kazan Arrows to change their senior squad to play rugby union. For the time being they will still run a junior rugby league team.

A Russian Ministry of Sports order number 21 dated 20 January 2010 expelled the Rugby League from the State Register of Sports of Russia. In February a new president of the RRLF was elected, Alexander Eremin.

Eremin, the board members and employees of the RRLF investigated the potential for the continuation of Rugby League in Russia with various government, civic and sports organizations, in particular the ministry of Sports and Rugby Union of Russia

== See also ==
- Rugby league in Russia
