= RC Lokomotiv Moscow =

Russian rugby (league & union) club, based in Moscow

Club information
- Full name: Rugby Club Lokomotiv Moscow
- Nickname: Lokomotiv
- Founded: 1937

Current details
- Ground: Lokomotiv Stadium (30,000)
- CEO: (Russia) Yevgeny Klebanov
- Coach: (Russia) Igor Ovchinnikov
- Competition: Russian Championship
- 2006: 1st

RC Lokomotiv Moscow is a professional Russian rugby football club based in Moscow, which from 2010 will field teams in both rugby league and rugby union. The club is one of the oldest in Russia. Originally a club for those who worked on the railways, they participated in the first USSR rugby union championship in 1937. Lokomotiv were Soviet Championship winners in 1983. During the existence of the USSR, RC Lokomotiv Moscow club was a part of the Lokomotiv Voluntary Sports Society.

In 1991, following Ryedale-York and Fulham's tour to the country, the club switched from rugby union to rugby league, owing mostly to rugby union's amateur status at the time, and the desire by players to be paid. Lokomotiv have gone on to dominate Russian rugby league. They have won seven Championships, including league and cup doubles in 2002–2005. Twelve players from the club were in the Russian national team in 2005.

Lokomotiv had their best season ever in 2005, winning the league and cup double in Russia, winning 21 out of 22 matches and scoring 1,560 points in the process. However, they have not yet transferred this success over to the Rugby League Challenge Cup. In their three previous games in this competition, they have failed to register a win.

In 2009 the club announced its intention to play rugby union in addition to rugby league from the 2010 season onwards, fielding their junior side in rugby league still and thereby partially reversing the club's 1991 switch from rugby union to rugby league. The decision to return to rugby union was primarily due to the desire of the Lokomotiv club to compete in the Russian rugby union sevens championship following the IOC's October 2009 decision to readmit rugby union as an Olympic sport in its seven-a-side format and the unwillingness of the Rugby Union of Russia to admit the Lokomotiv club to play in its rugby union sevens competition without also committing to the full 15-a-side version of rugby union.

== Notable international players ==
- (Russia) Vadim Postnikov
- (Russia) Petr Sokolov

== Honours ==
- Russian Championship: 9
  - 1983^{†}, 1993, 2000, 2002, 2003, 2004, 2005, 2006, 2007
- Russian Cup: 12
  - 1978^{†}, 1986^{†}, 1995, 2000, 2002, 2003, 2004, 2005, 2006, 2007, 2008, 2009

^{†}Rugby union honours

== See also ==
- FC Lokomotiv Moscow
