= James Matthews =

James, Jim or Jimmmy Matthews may refer to:

== Politicians, judges, and civil servants ==
- James Matthews (architect) (1819–1898), architect and lord provost of Aberdeen
- James S. Matthews, Louisiana state legislator
- James Campbell Matthews (1844–1930), Albany, New York attorney and judge
- James Ewen Matthews (1869–1950), Canadian member of parliament for Brandon
- James Herbert Matthews (1883–1972), Co-operative Commonwealth Federation member of the Canadian House of Commons
- Jim Matthews (politician), American politician from Pennsylvania

== Sportspeople ==
- James Matthews (footballer) (1876–1963), Australian rules footballer who played for North Adelaide and cricket for South Australia
- Jim Matthews (footballer, born 1880) (James Patrick Slattery Matthews, 1880–1940), Australian rules footballer
- Jimmy Matthews (1884–1943), Australian cricketer and Australian rules footballer
- Jim Matthews (sportsman, born 1919) (James Aubrey Matthews, 1919–1999), Australian rules footballer and tennis player
- Jim Matthews (rugby league) (born 1938), Australian rugby league footballer
- Jim Matthews (racing driver), American driver in the 2007 and 2008 Rolex Sports Car Series season

== Other people ==
- James Tilly Matthews (1770–1815), London tea broker committed to Bethlem psychiatric hospital
- James Duncan Matthews (1850–1890), Scottish zoologist
- James Brander Matthews (1852–1929), American writer
- J. S. Matthews (1878–1970), Vancouver archivist and historian
- James Robert Matthews (1889–1978), Scottish botanist
- Jim Matthews (writer) (1895–1982), New Zealand newspaper editor, gardening writer and horticulturist
- Jim Matthews (trade unionist) (James Matthews, 1903 or 1904–1969), British trade union leader
- James Matthews (writer) (1929–2024), South African writer
- James Matthews (hedge fund manager) (born 1975), British hedge fund manager and racing driver
- J. Clive Matthews, British writer and blogger

== Other ==
- Dr. James O. Matthews Office, historic doctor's office in North Carolina
- Murder of Jim Matthews, 2022 murder of Detroit anchorman

== See also ==
- James Mathews (disambiguation)
