= Henry Matthews =

Henry Matthews may refer to:

- Henry Matthews, 1st Viscount Llandaff (1826–1913), British lawyer and Conservative politician
- Henry Matthews (judge) (1789–1828), judge in Ceylon
- Henry Matthews (American football) (born 1949), American football player
- Henry John Matthews (1859–1909), New Zealand nurseryman and forester
- Henry George Matthews of HG Matthews Brickworks

== See also ==
- Harry Matthews (disambiguation)
- Matthews (surname)
