= Mathew =

Masculine given name

Mathew is a masculine given name and a variant of Matthew. It is also used as a surname.

== As a given name ==
Mathew
- Gender: Male

Other names
- Alternative spelling: Matthew

Notable people with the given name include:

- Mathew Baynton (born 1980), English actor and comedian
- Mathew Brady (1822-1896), American photographer
- Mat Erpelding (born 1975), American politician
- Mathew Horne (born 1978), English actor and comedian
- Mat Kearney (born 1978), American singer-songwriter
- Mat Latos (born 1987), American Major League Baseball pitcher
- Mat Mendenhall (born 1957), American former National Football League player
- Mathew Knowles (born 1952), record executive, band manager and father of Beyoncé and Solange
- Mat Osman (born 1967), English musician, bassist of the rock band Suede
- Mathew Leckie (born 1991), Australian footballer
- Mathew Martoma (born 1974), American hedge fund portfolio manager, convicted of insider trading
- Mathew Pitsch (born c. 1963), American businessman and politician
- Mathew Ryan (born 1992), Australian footballer
- Mathew Thompson (born 1982), Australian sports commentator and television presenter
- Mathew Barzal (born 1997), Canadian professional ice hockey centre
- Matt Willis (born 1983), English musician

== As a surname ==
Mathew
Other names
- Variant forms: Mathews; Matthew; Matthews

Notable people with the surname include:

- Annamma Mathew (1922–2003), chief editor of largest selling women's magazine in India, wife of K.M. Mathew
- Arnold Mathew (1852–1919), first Old Catholic bishop in the United Kingdom
- Bibin Mathew (born 1987), Indian track and field sprinter
- Biju Mathew, Indian-American activist
- Brian Mathew (born 1936), British botanist
- C. N. Saliya Mathew, 2nd Governor of Sabaragamuwa Province, Sri Lanka
- C. V. Mathew, Indian bishop
- Cyril Mathew (c.1912–1989), Sri Lankan politician and writer
- David Mathew (disambiguation)
- Edley Winston Mathew (1907-1978), Sri Lankan politician, Member of Parliament for Balangoda Electoral District
- Edward Mathew (British general) (1729–1805), fought in the American Revolutionary War
- Francis James Mathew, 2nd Earl Landaff (1768–1833), Irish politician
- Gervase Frederick Mathew (1842–1928), English naval officer and entomologist
- Harriet Mathew, 18th century London socialite and patron of the arts
- Hywel ap Syr Mathew (died 1581), Welsh poet, genealogist and soldier
- John Mathew (1849–1929), Australian Presbyterian minister and anthropologist
- K. K. Mathew 1911–1992), Indian Supreme Court judge
- K. M. Mathew (1917–2010), chief editor of leading Malayalam newspaper in Kerala, India
- KM Mathew, pen-name Ekalavyan, (1934–2012), Indian writer
- Karthika Mathew, Indian actress
- Kuzhivelil Mathew (born 1931), Indian biblical scholar
- Lazar Mathew, Indian medical academic
- Montague James Mathew (1773–1819), Irish politician and British Army general
- Nikhil Mathew (born 1984), singer from Kerala, India
- Oommen Mathew (1939–2013), Indian politician
- Ray Mathew (1929–2002), Australian author
- Rebekka Mathew (born 1986), Danish pop singer
- Robert Mathew (1911–1966), British barrister and politician
- Sarah Mathew (c. 1805–1890), New Zealand diarist
- Simon Mathew (born 1984), Danish pop singer
- Suleka Mathew, Canadian actress
- Sushanth Mathew (born 1981), Indian football player
- Theobald Mathew (disambiguation)
- M. Thomas Mathew (born 1940), Indian literary critic
- Trevin Mathew (born 1978), Sri Lankan cricketer
