= Matthew =

Matthew may refer to:

- Matthew (given name)
- Matthew (surname)

== Christianity ==
- Matthew the Apostle, one of the apostles of Jesus
- Gospel of Matthew, a book of the Bible

== Ships ==
- Matthew (1497 ship), the ship sailed by John Cabot in 1497, with two 1990s replicas
- MV Matthew I, a suspected drug-runner scuttled in 2013
- Interdiction of MV Matthew, a 2023 operation of the Irish military against a 2001 Panamanian cargo ship

== Other uses ==
- Matthew (album), a 2000 album by rapper Kool Keith
- Matthew (elm cultivar), a cultivar of the Chinese Elm Ulmus parvifolia

== See also ==
- Matt (given name), the diminutive form of Matthew
- Mathew, alternative spelling of Matthew
- Matthews (disambiguation)
- Matthew effect
- Tropical Storm Matthew (disambiguation)
