= Mathews (given name) =

Mathews is a given name. It is a variant of Matthew and is prominently used among the Saint Thomas Christians in Kerala, one of the world’s oldest Christian tradition.

Notable people with the name Mathews include:

- Mathews I or Baselios Marthoma Mathews I (1907–1996), Supreme Primate of Malankara Church, also known as Indian Orthodox Church
- Mathews II or Baselios Marthoma Mathews II (1915–2006) was the Supreme Primate of the Malankara Church, also known as Indian Orthodox Church
- Mathews III or Baselios Marthoma Mathews IIl the current Supreme Primate of the Malankara Church, also known as Indian Orthodox Church

== See also ==
- Mathew
- Mathews (surname)
- Matthews (disambiguation)
