= Mathews =

Mathews may refer to:

== People ==
- Matthew the Apostle
- Mathews (given name)
- Mathews I or Baselios Marthoma Mathews I (1907–1996), former primate of Malankara Church, also known as Indian Orthodox Church
- Mathews II or Baselios Marthoma Mathews II (1915–2006), former primate of the Malankara Church, also known as Indian Orthodox Church
- Mathews III or Baselios Marthoma Mathews III, the current primate of the Malankara Church, also known as Indian Orthodox Church
- Mathews (surname)
  - Mathews family, a US political family

== Places in the United States ==
- Mathews, Alabama
- Mathews, Louisiana
- Mathews, Virginia
- Mathews County, Virginia
- Mathews Bridge over the St. Johns River, Jacksonville, Florida

== See also ==
- Mathew
- Matthews (disambiguation)
