= David Matthews =

Dave or David Matthews may refer to:

== Music ==
- Dave Matthews (born 1967), lead singer and guitarist of the rock group Dave Matthews Band
- Dave Matthews (saxophonist) (1911–1997), American jazz saxophonist
- David Matthews (keyboardist) (born 1942), U.S. jazz composer, arranger, and keyboardist
- David Matthews (composer) (born 1943), English composer

== Politics ==
- David Mathews (c. 1739–1800), mayor of New York City
- David Matthews (British politician) (1868–1960), MP for Swansea East
- F. David Mathews (born 1935), academic and politician

== Sports ==
- David Matthews (rugby union) (1937–2019), rugby union flanker
- David Matthews (runner) (born 1974), Irish athlete
- David Mathews (field hockey) (born 1977), English field hockey player
- David Matthews (footballer) (born 1965), English footballer

== Other ==
- David Matthews (author) (born 1967), American author
- David Matthews (blackjack player), American blackjack player and writer
- David Matthews (academic) (1932–2020), American and British scholar, author, and translator
- David A. Matthews (1847–1923), American soldier and Medal of Honor recipient
- Dave Matthews (Family Affairs), fictional character in the British TV soap opera Family Affairs

== See also ==
- David Mathew (disambiguation)
