= Steve Matthews =

Steve Matthews may refer to:

- Steve Matthews (American football) (born 1970), former American football quarterback
- Steve A. Matthews (born 1955), American lawyer
- Steve Matthews (born 1979), birth name of American singer and bassist Argyle Goolsby
- Steve Matthews (rugby league), New Zealand rugby league player

== See also ==
- Matthews (disambiguation)
