= Harold Matthews (disambiguation) =

Harold Matthews was an Australian rules footballer.

Harold Matthews may also refer to:

- Harold Matthews Cup
- Harold Matthews (rugby league) for Balmain Tigers

== See also ==
- Harold Mathews Brett
- Harry Matthews (disambiguation)
- Matthews (surname)
