= 1999 Rugby League Tri-Nations =

Tri-national rugby championship

1999 Tri-Nations
- Number of teams: 3
- Winner: Australia (1st title)
- Matches played: 4
- Attendance: 70,295 (17,574 per match)
- Tries scored: 26 (6.5 per match)
- Top scorer: (Australia) Mat Rogers (36)
- Top try scorer: (New Zealand) Nigel Vagana (4)

The 1999 Rugby League Tri-Nations series was contested by Australia, Great Britain and New Zealand in 1999. It was the first multi-national rugby league tournament to feature the sport's three world powers since the 1989–1992 Rugby League World Cup (the 1995 World Cup featured England and Wales separately). Co-hosts Australia and New Zealand played in the final, which was narrowly won by the Kangaroos. Great Britain didn't win a game of the tournament.

After the Lions narrowly defeated the Queensland Cup premiers, Burleigh Bears, a poor crowd attended their match against Australia at Suncorp Stadium. Fearing a similar attendance for the series final, the tournament organisers relocated the match to Ericsson Stadium.

With the Rugby League World Cup to be staged the following year, and tours of Great Britain by Australia in 2001 and 2003 and New Zealand in 2002, the Tri-nations was not held again until 2004.

== Venues ==
The games were played at the following venues in Australia and New Zealand. The tournament final was played in Auckland.

Auckland	Brisbane
Mount Smart Stadium	Suncorp Stadium
Capacity: 30,000	Capacity: 52,500

== Results ==
=== Tournament matches ===
15 October

New Zealand	24–22	Australia
Tries: Stephen Kearney; Jason Lowrie; Willie Talau; Nigel Vagana; Goals: Henry Paul (4/4)		Tries: Brad Fittler (2); Matt Gidley; Russell Richardson; Mat Rogers; Goals: Mat Rogers (3/4)

Ericsson Stadium, Auckland
Attendance: 22,540
Referee: Russel Smith (England)

New Zealand	Australia

FB	1	Richie Barnett (c)
RW	2	Nigel Vagana
RC	3	Ruben Wiki
LC	4	Willie Talau
LW	5	Lesley Vainikolo
FE	6	Robbie Paul
HB	7	Stacey Jones
PR	8	Craig Smith
HK	9	Henry Paul
PR	10	Joe Vagana
SR	11	Matt Rua
SR	12	Stephen Kearney
LK	13	Logan Swann
Substitutions:
IC	14	David Kidwell
IC	15	Jason Lowrie
IC	16	Nathan Cayless
IC	17	Richard Swain
Coach:
(New Zealand) Frank Endacott

FB	1	Robbie Ross
RW	2	Mat Rogers
RC	3	Matthew Gidley
LC	4	Russell Richardson
LW	5	Wendell Sailor
FE	6	Brad Fittler (c)
HB	7	Brett Kimmorley
PR	8	Darren Britt
HK	9	Craig Gower
PR	10	Rodney Howe
SR	11	Bryan Fletcher
SR	12	Nik Kosef
LK	13	Jason Smith
Substitutions:
IC	14	Darren Lockyer
IC	15	Darren Smith
IC	16	Jason Stevens
IC	17	Michael Vella
Coach:
(Australia) Chris Anderson

22 October

Australia	42–6	Great Britain
Tries: Darren Lockyer (2); Brad Fittler; Matt Gidley; Brett Kimmorley; Wendell Sailor; Jason Smith; Goals: Mat Rogers (6/6); Ryan Girdler (1/2)		Tries: Iestyn Harris Goals: Andy Farrell (1/1)

Suncorp Stadium, Brisbane
Attendance: 12,511
Referee: David Pakieto (New Zealand)

Australia	Great Britain

FB	1	Darren Lockyer
RW	2	Mat Rogers
RC	3	Shaun Timmins
LC	4	Matthew Gidley
LW	5	Wendell Sailor
FE	6	Matthew Johns
HB	7	Brett Kimmorley
PR	8	Darren Britt
HK	9	Craig Gower
PR	10	Rodney Howe
SR	11	Bryan Fletcher
SR	12	Nik Kosef
LK	13	Brad Fittler (c)
Substitutions:
IC	14	Ryan Girdler
IC	15	Darren Smith
IC	16	Jason Smith
IC	17	Michael Vella
Coach:
(Australia) Chris Anderson

FB	1	Kris Radlinski
RW	2	Jason Robinson
RC	3	Gary Connolly
LC	4	Keith Senior
LW	5	Anthony Sullivan
SO	6	Iestyn Harris
SH	7	Ryan Sheridan
PR	8	Dale Laughton
HK	9	Keiron Cunningham
PR	10	Barrie McDermott
SR	11	Denis Betts
SR	12	Adrian Morley
LF	13	Andy Farrell (c)
Substitutions:
IC	14	Sean Long
IC	15	Paul Anderson
IC	16	Paul Sculthorpe
IC	17	Andy Hay
Coach:
(England) Andy Goodway

29 October

New Zealand	26–4	Great Britain
Tries: Nigel Vagana (2); Matt Rua; Joe Vagana; Goals: Henry Paul (5/5)		Tries: Sean Long Goals: Andy Farrell (0/1)

Ericsson Stadium, Auckland
Attendance: 14,040
Referee: Tim Mander (Australia)

New Zealand	Great Britain

FB	1	Richie Barnett (c)
RW	2	Nigel Vagana
RC	3	Ruben Wiki
LC	4	Willie Talau
LW	5	Lesley Vainikolo
FE	6	Henry Paul
HB	7	Robbie Paul
PR	8	Joe Vagana
HK	9	Richard Swain
PR	10	Craig Smith
SR	11	Matt Rua
SR	12	Stephen Kearney
LK	13	Logan Swann
Substitutions:
IC	14	Gene Ngamu
IC	15	Jason Lowrie
IC	16	Nathan Cayless
IC	17	David Kidwell
Coach:
(New Zealand) Frank Endacott

FB	1	Kris Radlinski
RW	2	Jason Robinson
RC	3	Gary Connolly
LC	4	Keith Senior
LW	5	Francis Cummins
SO	6	Iestyn Harris
SH	7	Ryan Sheridan
PR	8	Dale Laughton
HK	9	Keiron Cunningham
PR	10	Barrie McDermott
SR	11	Adrian Morley
SR	12	Chris Joynt
LF	13	Andy Farrell (c)
Substitutions:
IC	14	Sean Long
IC	15	Denis Betts
IC	16	Mike Forshaw
IC	17	Andy Hay
Coach:
(England) Andy Goodway

=== Tournament standings ===
Team	Played	Won	Drew	Lost	For	Against	Difference	Points
New Zealand	2	2	0	0	50	26	+24	4
Australia	2	1	0	1	64	30	+34	2
Great Britain	2	0	0	2	10	68	−58	0

=== Final ===
5 November

New Zealand	20–22	Australia
Tries: Robbie Paul; Nigel Vagana Goals: Henry Paul (6/7)		Tries: Mat Rogers (2); Matthew Johns; Wendell Sailor; Goals: Mat Rogers (3/5)

Ericsson Stadium, Auckland
Attendance: 21,204
Referee: Russell Smith (England)

New Zealand	Australia

FB	1	Richie Barnett (c)
RW	2	Nigel Vagana
RC	3	Ruben Wiki
LC	4	Willie Talau
LW	5	Lesley Vainikolo
FE	6	Henry Paul
HB	7	Robbie Paul
PR	8	Joe Vagana
HK	9	Richard Swain
PR	10	Craig Smith
SR	11	Matt Rua
SR	12	Stephen Kearney
LK	13	Logan Swann
Substitutions:
IC	14	Gene Ngamu
IC	15	Jason Lowrie
IC	16	Nathan Cayless
IC	17	David Kidwell
Coach:
(New Zealand) Frank Endacott

FB	1	Darren Lockyer
RW	2	Mat Rogers
RC	3	Matthew Gidley
LC	4	Darren Smith
LW	5	Wendell Sailor
FE	6	Matthew Johns
HB	7	Brett Kimmorley
PR	18	Jason Stevens
HK	9	Craig Gower
PR	10	Darren Britt
SR	11	Bryan Fletcher
SR	12	Nik Kosef
LK	13	Brad Fittler (c)
Substitutions:
IC	14	Jason Smith
IC	15	Ryan Girdler
IC	16	Michael Vella
IC	17	Shaun Timmins
Coach:
(Australia) Chris Anderson

=== Non-series Test ===
During the series, New Zealand also played a Test against Tonga. This was the last test match to be held at Auckland's Carlaw Park.

27 October

New Zealand	74–0	Tonga
Tries: Brian Jellick (4); Nigel Vagana (3); David Kidwell; Jason Lowrie; Henry Paul; Tony Puletua; Richard Swain; Lesley Vainikolo; Goals: Henry Paul (11/13)		Tries: Goals:

Carlaw Park, Auckland
Attendance: 4,528
Referee: Andy Cook (New Zealand)

New Zealand	Tonga

FB	1	Richie Barnett (c)
LW	2	Brian Jellick
RC	3	David Kidwell
LC	4	Ruben Wiki
RW	5	Lesley Vainikolo
FE	6	Henry Paul
HB	7	Stacey Jones
PR	8	Joe Vagana
HK	9	Richard Swain
PR	10	Terry Hermansson
SR	11	Tony Puletua
SR	12	Stephen Kearney
LK	13	Logan Swann
Substitutions:
IC	14	Willie Talau
IC	15	Nathan Cayless
IC	16	Jason Lowrie
IC	17	Nigel Vagana
Coach:
(New Zealand) Frank Endacott

FB	1	Paul Koloi
LW	2	Tevita Ole'o
RC	3	Phil Howlett (c)
LC	4	Greg Wolfgramm
RW	5	Kotoni Seleti
FE	6	Tevita Vaikona
HB	7	Lani Filiai
PR	8	Nelson Lomi
HK	9	Esau Mann
PR	10	Liuaki Hansen
SR	11	Andrew Lomu
SR	12	Alfons Masella
LK	13	Sione Marima
Substitutions:
IC	14	Fili Lolohea
IC	15	Tu'ihaka Valu Afungia
IC	16	Chief Lee
IC	17	Viliami Soni
Coach:

=== Non-series Match ===
As a curtain raiser to the final, New Zealand Māori played Great Britain.

5 November

Māori	12–22	Great Britain
Tries: Alex Chan; Darren Rameka Goals: Luke Goodwin (1); Willie Rangi (1)		Tries: Sean Long (2); James Lowes; Anthony Sullivan; Goals: Andy Farrell (3)

Ericsson Stadium, Auckland
Attendance: 21,204
Referee: David Pakieto (New Zealand)

Māori	Great Britain

FB	1	Alex Chan
LW	2	Steve Matthews
RC	3	Peter Lewis
LC	4	Steve Berryman
RW	5	Jared Mills
FE	6	Luke Goodwin
HB	7	Willie Rangi
PR	8	Paul Rauhihi
HK	9	Tukere Barlow (c)
PR	10	John Edmonds
SR	11	Robert Henare
SR	12	Darren Rameka
LK	13	Andrew Wynyard
Substitutions:
IC	14	Gavin Bailey
IC	15	Martin Moana
IC	16	Frank Watene
IC	17	Wairangi Koopu
Coach:
(New Zealand) Cameron Bell

FB	1	Kris Radlinski
RW	2	Jason Robinson
RC	3	Keith Senior
LC	4	Anthony Sullivan
LW	5	Francis Cummins
SO	6	Andy Farrell (c)
SH	7	Sean Long
PR	8	Paul Anderson
HK	9	Keiron Cunningham
PR	10	Dale Laughton
SR	11	Adrian Morley
SR	12	Paul Sculthorpe
LF	13	Chris Joynt
Substitutions:
IC	14	Stuart Fielden
IC	15	Barrie McDermott
IC	16	Mike Forshaw
IC	17	Andy Hay
Coach:
(England) Andy Goodway
