= Harry Matthews =

Harry Matthews may refer to:

- Harry Grindell Matthews (1880–1941), English inventor
- Harry Matthews (boxer) (1922–2003), American boxer

== See also ==
- Harry Mathews (1930–2017), American author and poet
- Harry Mathews (baseball) (1876 – after 1929), baseball coach
- Harry Matthew (1870–1956), Scottish footballer
- Harold Matthews (disambiguation)
- Henry Matthews (disambiguation)
- Matthews (surname)
