= Matthews (surname) =

This page lists notable people with the surname (that is, family name) Matthews.

For a list of notable people with the surname Matthew (without -s), see Matthew (surname).

For a list of notable people with the surname Mathews (with only one "t"), see Mathews (surname).

For a list of notable people with the forename (that is, given name) Matthew, see Matthew (name).

For the etymology of the name Matthew and for cognates (related forenames and surnames), see Matthew (name).

Matthews is a surname derived from the forename Matthew.

== Geographical distribution ==
As of 2014, 53.6% of all known bearers of the surname Matthews were residents of the United States (frequency 1:2,136), 19.2% of England (1:917), 8.1% of Australia (1:932), 4.9% of South Africa (1:3,498), 4.8% of Canada (1:2,425), 2.0% of Wales (1:492), 1.1% of New Zealand (1:1,251), 1.0% of the Republic of Ireland (1:1,445) and 1.0% of Jamaica (1:908).

In Wales, the frequency of the surname was higher than average (1:492) in the following principal areas:

1. Caerphilly County Borough (1:229)
2. Torfaen (1:278)
3. Bridgend County Borough (1:306)
4. Swansea (1:384)
5. Wrexham County Borough (1:399)
6. Monmouthshire (1:400)
7. Neath Port Talbot (1:423)
8. Rhondda Cynon Taf (1:447)
9. Vale of Glamorgan (1:465)
10. Merthyr Tydfil County Borough (1:465)
11. Blaenau Gwent (1:488)

In England, the frequency of the surname was higher than average (1:917) in the following unitary authority districts:

1. Cornwall (1:376)
2. Herefordshire (1:385)
3. Staffordshire (1:557)
4. Wiltshire (1:561)
5. Isle of Wight (1:569)
6. Gloucestershire (1:599)
7. Dorset (1:615)
8. Shropshire (1:623)
9. Devon (1:626)
10. Hampshire (1:627)
11. West Sussex (1:642)
12. Rutland (1:654)
13. Oxfordshire (1:670)
14. Worcestershire (1:680)
15. Norfolk (1:713)
16. Bristol (1:715)
17. Surrey (1:737)
18. Somerset (1:760)
19. East Sussex (1:760)
20. Cambridgeshire (1:777)
21. Kent (1:801)
22. Warwickshire (1:820)
23. Essex (1:825)
24. Nottinghamshire (1:850)
25. West Midlands (1:859)
26. Suffolk (1:860)
27. Berkshire (1:867)
28. Bedfordshire (1:882)
29. Hertfordshire (1:890)
30. Buckinghamshire (1:896)

In the United States, the frequency of the surname was higher than average (1:2,136) in the following states:

1. North Carolina (1:907)
2. Maryland (1:971)
3. Louisiana (1:1,014)
4. South Carolina (1:1,090)
5. Delaware (1:1,168)
6. Mississippi (1:1,209)
7. Alabama (1:1,244)
8. Tennessee (1:1,336)
9. Arkansas (1:1,400)
10. Virginia (1:1,656)
11. Oklahoma (1:1,657)
12. Washington, D.C. (1:1,660)
13. Georgia (1:1,786)
14. Idaho (1:1,945)
15. Texas (1:1,989)
16. Michigan (1:2,094)

== Art, design, media, and literature ==
- A. E. Matthews, English actor
- Barbara Winifred Matthews (1917–1997), New Zealand gardening writer and horticulturist
- Brett Matthews, American writer of comics and TV shows
- Celeste Matthews, South African actress and playwright
- Chris Matthews, American television talk show host
- Dakin Matthews, American actor
- Francis Matthews (actor), English film, TV and stage actor
- Herbert Matthews, reporter for the New York Times
- Ingrid Ciprian-Matthews, American journalist and television producer
- James Brander Matthews (1852–1929), American writer and educator
- James William Matthews (1895–1982), New Zealand newspaper editor, gardening writer, and magazine founder
- Janet Matthews, Australian artist
- Jared Matthews American Ballet Theatre soloist
- Jeffery Matthews (1928–2023), British postage stamp designer
- Kathleen Matthews, anchor for ABC 7 News/ WJLA-TV in Washington, D.C.
- Kevin Matthews (radio personality), Midwest-based radio personality
- Lester Matthews, English actor
- Liesel Matthews, American heiress, socialite, and actress
- Mariana Matthews (born 1946), Chilean photographer
- Rodney Matthews, English fantasy artist and illustrator
- Sally Ann Matthews, English actress known for roles in British soap operas
- Sally Matthews (sculptor) (born 1964), English sculptor
- Tina Matthews (born 1961), New Zealand author, illustrator, and puppet maker
- William Matthews (poet), American poet and essayist

== Business and invention ==
- Bernard Matthews, founder of a food processing company
- Christopher Matthews (businessman), British businessman
- Gordon Matthews (inventor), American inventor and businessman
- Harry Grindell Matthews (1880–1941), English inventor
- Terry Matthews, Welsh/Canadian high tech entrepreneur
- Victor Matthews, Baron Matthews, British businessman

== Military ==
- Al Matthews (actor) (1942–2018), member of the U.S. Marine Corps and actor
- Bruce Matthews (Canadian Army officer), commander of the 2nd Canadian Infantry Division in World War II
- Francis P. Matthews (1887–1952), 49th U.S. Secretary of the Navy
- H. Spencer Matthews, (1921–2002), first U.S. naval pilot to be promoted to admiral
- Mark Matthews (1894–2005), former Buffalo Soldier in the U.S. Army
- Peter Matthews (rebel) (c.1790–1838), farmer and soldier who participated in the Upper Canada Rebellion of 1837
- Saul Matthews, African-American American Revolutionary War hero

== Music ==
- Andrew Matthews-Owen, Welsh pianist
- Artie Matthews (1888–1958), American ragtime composer
- Ben Matthews (musician), English guitarist and keyboard player with the band Thunder
- Ceri Rhys Matthews (born 1960) Welsh traditional musician
- Cerys Matthews (born 1969), Welsh singer
- Colin Matthews (born 1946), English composer
- Dave Matthews (born 1967), South African musician
- David Matthews (composer) (born 1943), English composer
- Denise Katrina Matthews, known as Vanity (1959–2016), Canadian singer, actress, and religious leader
- Edward Matthews (singer), pioneering African-American opera singer
- Emma Matthews (born 1970), Australian operatic soprano
- Iain Matthews, English musician and songwriter
- Jessie Matthews, popular English actress, dancer, and singer of the 1930s
- Julie Matthews (born 1963), English singer-songwriter
- Krissy Matthews (born 1992), British-Norwegian blues rock singer-songwriter and guitarist.
- Lee Matthews (singer) (born 1988), Irish singer songwriter, formerly Lee Mulhern
- Neal Matthews, Jr., American singer
- Patrick Matthews, former bassist of Australian band The Vines
- Ron Matthews (musician), original drummer for English band Iron Maiden
- Sally Matthews (born 1975), British operatic soprano
- Scott Matthews, English singer-songwriter from Wolverhampton
- Wendy Matthews, Canadian adult alternative pop singer

== Politics ==
- Albert Edward Matthews, Lieutenant Governor of Ontario
- Allen S. Matthews, American merchant and politician
- Asa C. Matthews, American politician
- Bill Matthews, Canadian politician
- Carolyn Matthews, American politician
- Claude Matthews, governor of the U.S. state of Indiana from 1893 to 1897
- Charles Matthews (Texas politician), former member of the Texas Railroad Commission
- Deb Matthews, politician in Ontario, Canada
- Francis P. Matthews (1887–1952), U.S. Secretary of the Navy
- Gabriel Baccus Matthews, Liberian politician
- Gary Matthews (politician), Speaker of the Montana House of Representatives
- Henry Matthews, 1st Viscount Llandaff, British Conservative politician and statesman
- Jim Matthews (politician), public official in Pennsylvania
- John H. Matthews, Canadian politician
- Joseph W. Matthews, Governor of Mississippi from 1848 to 1850
- Michael J. Matthews (1934–2014), American mayor
- Norman Derek Matthews, OBE (1922–1976), British colonial administrator and diplomat
- Philip Bushill-Matthews, British politician and Member of the European Parliament
- Print Matthews, Reconstruction-era social organizer murdered while voting
- Robert Charles Matthews, Canadian politician
- Stanley Matthews (judge), Republican politician and jurist from Ohio
- William Matthews (politician), American politician

== Sciences ==
- Andrew Matthews (entomologist) (1815–1897), British clergyman and entomologist
- Drummond Matthews (1931–1997), English marine geologist and geophysicist
- James Robert Matthews (1889–1978), Scottish botanist
- Jaymie Matthews (born 1958), Canadian astrophysicist
- John Matthews (1930–2025), British agricultural engineer
- Mabel Lucy Matthews (1879–1970), British electrical and production engineer
- Paul Taunton Matthews, (1919–1987) British theoretical physicist
- Tonya Matthews, American biomedical engineer
- William Matthews (engineer), British civil engineer
- Zachariah Keodirelang Matthews (1901–1968), Tswana South African anthropologist

== Sports ==
- A.J. Matthews (born 1988), American mixed martial artist
- Adam Matthews, Welsh footballer
- Al Matthews (American football) (1947–2025), professional football player
- Angelo Mathews (born 1987), Sri Lanka cricketer
- Austin Matthews, cricketer who played for Northamptonshire, Glamorgan and England
- Auston Matthews (born 1997), American ice hockey player for the Toronto Maple Leafs
- Beau Matthews, Australian para-swimmer
- Brenda Matthews, New Zealand sprinter
- Brice Matthews (born 2002), American baseball player
- Charles Matthews (basketball) (born 1996), American basketball player
- Christopher Matthews (cricketer), former Australian cricketer
- Craig Matthews, South African cricketer
- Darren Matthews (born 1968), English professional wrestler better known as William Regal
- Denny Matthews, American sportscaster
- Don Matthews, head coach in the Canadian Football League
- Gary Matthews, outfielder in Major League Baseball
- Gary Matthews, Jr., Major League Baseball player with the Los Angeles Angels of Anaheim
- Greg Matthews, New South Wales and Australian cricketer
- H. L. Matthews (1889–1975), American college sports coach and patriarch of the American football family listed below
- Hannah Matthews, Irish field hockey player. * Hayley Matthews (born, 1998) Barbados and West Indies cricket player
- Helen Matthews, Scottish footballer and suffragette.
- Jimmy Matthews, Australian Test cricketer
- Ken Matthews (1934–2019), English race walker
- Lee Matthews (footballer), English football (soccer) player
- Leigh Matthews, Australian Rules football player
- Michael Matthews (cyclist), Australian cyclist
- Mickey Matthews, head football coach at James Madison University
- Mike Matthews (born 1973), Major League Baseball pitcher
- Morgan Matthews (figure skater), American figure skater
- Rayner Matthews, American motocross racer
- Robert William Matthews, Welsh footballer
- Shane Matthews, quarterback in the National Football League
- Stanley Matthews (1915–2000), English footballer
- Todd Matthews-Jouda, hurdling athlete
- Vincent Matthews (athlete) (born 1947), American athlete
- Wayne Matthews (footballer) (born 1964), Welsh professional footballer
- Wayne Matthews (American football) (born 2002), American football player
- Will Matthews (rugby union), rugby union footballer
- William Clarence Matthews (1877–1928), baseball player and political activist.
- Zebby Matthews (born 2000), American baseball player
- A family of American football players descended from H. L. Matthews:
  - First generation:
    - Clay Matthews Sr. (1928–2017), offensive lineman (son of H. L.)
  - Second generation (both sons of Clay Sr.):
    - Clay Matthews Jr. (born 1956), linebacker
    - Bruce Matthews (born 1961), offensive lineman and coach
  - Third generation:
    - Clay Matthews III (born 1986), linebacker (son of Clay Jr.)
    - Kevin Matthews (American football) (born 1987), offensive lineman (son of Bruce)
    - Casey Matthews (born 1989), linebacker (son of Clay Jr.)
    - Jake Matthews (born 1992), offensive lineman (son of Bruce)

== Other ==
- Barry Matthews, chief executive of the New Zealand Department of Corrections
- Frank Matthews (born 1944), drug trafficker
- James M. Matthews, first chancellor of New York University
- James Tilly Matthews (1770–1815), London tea merchant and schizophrenia sufferer
- Ken Matthews (public servant), Australian public servant
- Leigh Matthews, South African university student who was kidnapped and murdered in 2004: see Murder of Leigh Matthews
- Lisa Matthews, 1991 playmate of the year
- Peter Matthews (linguist), British linguist
- Peter H. Matthews (1873–1916), operator of policy games in New York City
- Robert Matthews (religious figure) (1778–1841), American religious figure
- R. D. Matthews, Texan organized crime figure
- Thaddeus Matthews (1958–2025), American pastor and broadcaster
- Victoria Matthews, Canadian Anglican bishop
- Walter Matthews (priest) Dean of St Paul's Cathedral, London
- Warren W. Matthews Jr. (born 1939), American jurist
- William Matthews (priest) (1770–1854), American Catholic priest and president of Georgetown College
- Shannon Matthews, British child who disappeared in 2008: see Kidnapping of Shannon Matthews

== Fictional characters ==
- Aspen Matthews, main character of Fathom
- Bree Matthews, main character from the YA novel Legendborn
- Cathy Matthews, from the British soap opera Coronation Street
- Cory Matthews, main character on Boy Meets World
- Courtney Matthews, character on the ABC soap opera General Hospital
- Dave Matthews (Family Affairs), fictional character in U.K. soap opera Family Affairs
- Duncan Matthews, fictional character on the animated TV show X-Men: Evolution
- Eric Matthews (Saw), fictional character of film series Saw
- Grant Matthews, the main character in State of the Union
- Holden Matthews, the main character in the TV series Beyond
- Hosea Matthews, fictional character from the video game Red Dead Redemption 2
- Josh Matthews (Family Affairs), fictional character in U.K. soap opera Family Affairs
- Paige Matthews, fictional character
- Riley Matthews, the main character on Girl Meets World
- Sonali Matthews, American Girl character from the Chrissa books and movie

== See also ==
- Matthew (given name)
