= Alfred Buxton =

Alfred Buxton may refer to:

- Alfred Fowell Buxton (1854–1952), British banker and local politician
- Alfred William Buxton (1872–1950), New Zealand landscape gardener and nurseryman
