= Admiral Matthews =

Admiral Matthews or Mathews may refer to:

- Andrew Mathews (Royal Navy officer) (born 1958), British Royal Navy vice admiral
- H. Spencer Matthews (1921–2002), U.S. Navy rear admiral
- Thomas Mathews (1676–1751), British Royal Navy admiral
- Timothy S. Matthews (born 1958), U.S. Navy admiral
