= Barbara Winifred Matthews =

Journalist, writer, horticulturist

Barbara Winifred Matthews (née Silver; 9 July 1917 – 10 July 1997) was a New Zealand newspaper and magazine editor, gardening writer, and horticulturist.

== Biography ==
Born Barbara Winifred Silver in Lower Hutt, she was the daughter of Winifred Louisa (Brailsford) Silver and Lewis Mair Silver, an electrical engineer. She grew up in Seatoun and was educated at Wellington East Girls' College. On leaving school, she began to contribute regularly to Wellington's daily newspaper, The Dominion, going on to become the editor of the children's page and then editor of the women's section.

In 1938, she married James William "Jim" Matthews, the Dominion's news editor; they had two sons, Lewis and Julian, who both also became horticulturalists and writers. In 1941, they coauthored the very successful New Zealand Garden Dictionary, which went through multiple editions between 1941 and 1968.

Four years later, they left the newspaper to become freelance writers on gardening and horticultural subjects. In 1944, Jim founded a new monthly magazine, New Zealand Gardener, and for more than two decades Barbara wrote for it, worked as its assistant editor, and promoted it to horticultural groups around the country. An avid photographer, she also provided photographs of plants and landscapes to gardening magazines, horticultural books, and local newspapers. Starting in the late 1960s, when Jim's eyesight got bad, she wrote his popular newspaper column "Garden with Matthews" for him until 1987, though it continued to appear under his byline.

Matthews and her husband were interested in plant breeding and also ran a flower business that supplied Wellington flower shops with roses, proteas, and other blooms.

In 1964, she was made an associate of honour of the Royal New Zealand Institute of Horticulture.

In the 1950s, Barbara and her family lived in Waikanae on a property where the garden had been designed by the landscape architect Alfred William Buxton.

She died in Titahi Bay in 1997, surviving her husband by 15 years.

== Books ==
- The New Zealand Garden Dictionary (1941, with Jim Matthews)
- Gardens of New Zealand (1975, with Conon Fraser)
- Growing Native Plants (1979)
- An Illustrated Garden Dictionary (1979, with Lewis Matthews)
