= Bellingdon =

Village in Buckinghamshire, England

Coordinates: 51.734876°N 0.630916°W

- St John's Church, Bellingdon in 2026

- Location within Buckinghamshire
- OS grid reference: SP9404
- Civil parish: Chartridge
- Unitary authority: Buckinghamshire
- Ceremonial county: Buckinghamshire
- Region: South East
- Country: England
- Sovereign state: United Kingdom
- Post town: CHESHAM
- Postcode district: HP5
- Dialling code: 01494
- Police: Thames Valley
- Fire: Buckinghamshire
- Ambulance: South Central
- UK Parliament: Mid Buckinghamshire

Bellingdon is a village in the civil parish of Chartridge (where the 2011 Census was included), in Buckinghamshire, England. The name derives from the Anglo Saxon Bellingdenu or Bella's Valley, and is recorded as Belenden in the 15th century. It is arranged along a ridge, typical of the Chiltern Hills to the north of Chesham.

== Early settlement ==
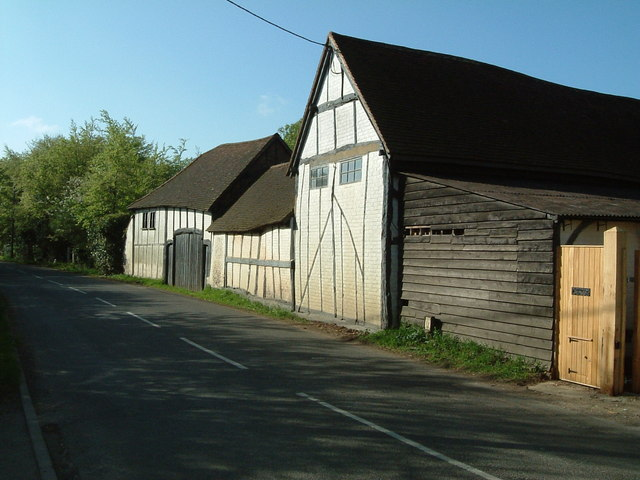
Huge Farm, Bellingdon

Until the end of the 19th century Bellingdon consisted of a number of scattered farms including Bank, Peppetts, Bellingdon End, Bloomfield, Huge, Hazeldean and Vale Farms which were built in the late 16th or early 17th-century. The abundance of clay deposits led to a number of brickworks being established in the 19th century, two of which were: Bellingdon brickworks (now HG Matthews) in 1891 and another at Bloomfield Farm in 1899, then in the 20th century on Gyles Road and Oak Lane. Bakers brickyard, known as Lower Kiln, was situated opposite Huge Farm and was owned by the Baker family for three generations since 1899 when Joseph Baker the youngest son of the brickmaking Bakers from nearby Wigginton bought the brickyard for £5 from a Mr Clarke. Joseph, followed by his son William and then William's sons made bricks here until they ran out of clay in 1964. They were well known in the area for the excellent quality of their bricks.

== Modern day settlement ==
H.G. Matthews brickworks, 2026

The village hall was built around 1948 using a 'standard hut' provided by the National Council for Social Service on land given by Miss Marian Thompson, the first W.I. President. Together with the adjoining playing fields, it is shared with the people of the nearby hamlet of Asheridge. In 2010 a grant was awarded to fund the construction of a playground next to the village hall. At the northern end of the village is the premises of The Bull public house which ceased to trade in the summer of 2009 and was boarded up, and beyond this the largest employer in the village, HG Matthews Brickworks which was acquired by the family in 1924. Also at this end of the village is the Bellingdon End Farm shop selling equestrian supplies, animal feed and clothing.

== Churches ==
In the nineteenth century there was a Baptist meeting in the village at Peppett's Green, which was run by the Congregational Church and the Lower Baptist Chapel (now Trinity Baptist) in Chesham. It is mentioned in the 1851 Ecclesiastical Census. Peppett's Farm was owned by the Lower Baptist Church but sold in the 1920s.

St John's Church, in the centre of the village, is part of the ecclesiastical parish of Great Chesham. The Anglican congregation started in the 1870s; in the 1880s it met in the Mission Room at Sun Cottage. The current tin tabernacle building was built in 1901. In 1958, the building was named "St John's", after St John the Evangelist.

== Education ==
There is no school in the village. Children under 11 attend Chartridge Combined School, Hawridge and Cholesbury Church of England School or Little Spring Primary School. The catchment area secondary schools are:- Chiltern Hills Academy and Chesham Grammar School in Chesham, Amersham School and Dr Challoner's Grammar School for boys in Amersham and Dr Challoner's High School for girls in Little Chalfont.

== Notable people ==
- D.H. Lawrence rented one of the three Bellingdon Farm cottages called 'The Triangle' in Hawridge Lane for a short period between August 1914 and January 1915 during which time he wrote The Rainbow.
