= Fiona Farrell =

New Zealand writer (born 1947)

Fiona Farrell ONZM
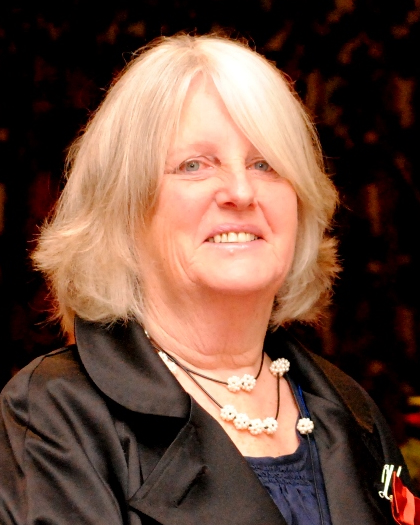
- Farrell in 2012
- Born: 1947 (age 78–79); Oamaru, New Zealand
- Education: University of Otago; University of Toronto
- Writing career
- Genres: Fiction; non-fiction; plays; poetry

Fiona Farrell ONZM (born 1947) is a New Zealand poet, fiction and non-fiction writer and playwright.

== Early years and education ==
Farrell was born and raised in Oamaru, in the South Island of New Zealand. She attended Waitaki Girls' High School, then graduated with a Bachelor of Arts degree from the University of Otago in 1968. Farrell moved to Oxford in the United Kingdom with her husband after graduating and was enrolled at the University of London in art history. She and her husband then moved to Canada where Farrell graduated Master of Arts (1973) and MPhil in drama (1976) at the University of Toronto. She worked as a drama lecturer at the Palmerston North Teachers' College and lived in Palmerston North from 1976 to 1991 where she began her writing career creating plays with New Zealand content for her students.

== Career ==
Farrell has held numerous residencies and been recognised for her writing in many ways, including at the New Zealand Book Awards where she has been a finalist in all three categories, for fiction, non-fiction and poetry. Her first novel, The Skinny Louie Book, won the fiction award in 1993, and three subsequent novels have been shortlisted for the award. Four have been nominated for the International Dublin IMPAC Award. Two works of non-fiction, The Broken Book (2011) and The Villa at the Edge of the Empire (2015), a study of the impact of the earthquakes of 2010-2011 on her then home town, Christchurch, were shortlisted for the non-fiction award. Her poetry collection, The Pop-Up Book of Invasions, written while she held a writing residency in Donoughmore, Ireland, was a finalist in the poetry section at the 2008 NZ Book Awards. She has been a frequent guest at festivals throughout New Zealand and abroad, including Adelaide, Vancouver, Salisbury UK and Edinburgh. Between 1992 and 2017, she lived with her husband, Doug Hood, at Otanerito, a remote bay on Banks Peninsula, where their home was one of the accommodation points on the Banks Peninsula Track. Farrell has two daughters. She is now based in Dunedin.

== Awards and honours ==
Farrell has won several awards for short fiction, including the Bank of New Zealand Katherine Mansfield Memorial Award and the American Express Award.

- 1983 inaugural Bruce Mason Playwriting Award
- 1990 The Perils of Pauline Smith' (1990) won the Mobil Award for Best Radio Drama
- 1991–1992 Canterbury University Writer in Residence
- 'Chook Chook' (1992) remains one of Playmarket's most frequently requested scripts
- 1993 The Skinny Louie Book (Penguin, 1992) won the 1993 New Zealand Book Award for Fiction
- 1995 recipient of the Meridian Energy Katherine Mansfield Memorial Fellowship
- 2003, 2005 The Hopeful Traveller (Random House, 2002) and Book Book (Random House, 2004) were runners-up at the Montana New Zealand Book Awards in 2003 and 2005 respectively, and were also nominated for International IMPAC Dublin Literary Awards 2003 and 2005.
- 2006 Rathcoola Residency in Donoughmore, Ireland
- 2007 Prime Minister's Awards for Literary Achievement worth $60,000.
- 2008 The Pop-Up Book of Invasions (Auckland University Press, 2007) was runner-up in the poetry category at the 2008 Montana New Zealand Book Awards.
- 2009 Mr Allbones' Ferrets (Random House, 2007) was nominated for the 2009 Dublin IMPAC Award
- 2010 Finalist in the 2010 New Zealand Book Awards in the Fiction category for her novel, Limestone (Random House, 2009)
- 2011 Robert Burns Fellow
- 2012 Appointed Officer of the New Zealand Order of Merit, for services to literature, in the 2012 Queen's Birthday and Diamond Jubilee Honours
- 2013 Awarded the $100,000 Creative New Zealand Michael King Writer's Fellowship to research and write twin books, one fiction and one non-fiction, inspired by her experiences of the Christchurch earthquakes
- 2016 The Villa at the Edge of the Empire: One Hundred Ways to Read a City was a finalist for the Non-Fiction section of the 2016 Ockham New Zealand Book Awards.
- 2022 Fellow of the Academy of New Zealand Literature

== Bibliography ==
Novels:

- The Skinny Louie Book (Penguin, 1992)
- Six Clever Girls Who Became Famous Women (Penguin, 1996)
- The Hopeful Traveller (Vintage, 2002)
- Book Book (Vintage, 2004)
- Mr Allbones' Ferrets (Vintage, 2007; Thomas Dunne Books, 2009)
- Limestone (Vintage, 2009)
- Decline and Fall on Savage Street (Penguin Random House, 2017)
- The Deck (Penguin Random House, 2023)

Poetry:

- Cutting Out (Auckland University Press, 1987)
- The Inhabited Initial (Auckland University Press, 1999)
- The Pop-Up Book of Invasions (Auckland University Press, 2007)
- Nouns, verbs, etc. (selected poems) (Otago University Press, 2020)

Short Stories:

- The Rock Garden (Auckland University Press, 1989)
- Light Readings (Vintage, 2001)

Non-fiction:

- The Quake Year (with photographer Juliet Nicholas; Canterbury University Press, 2012)
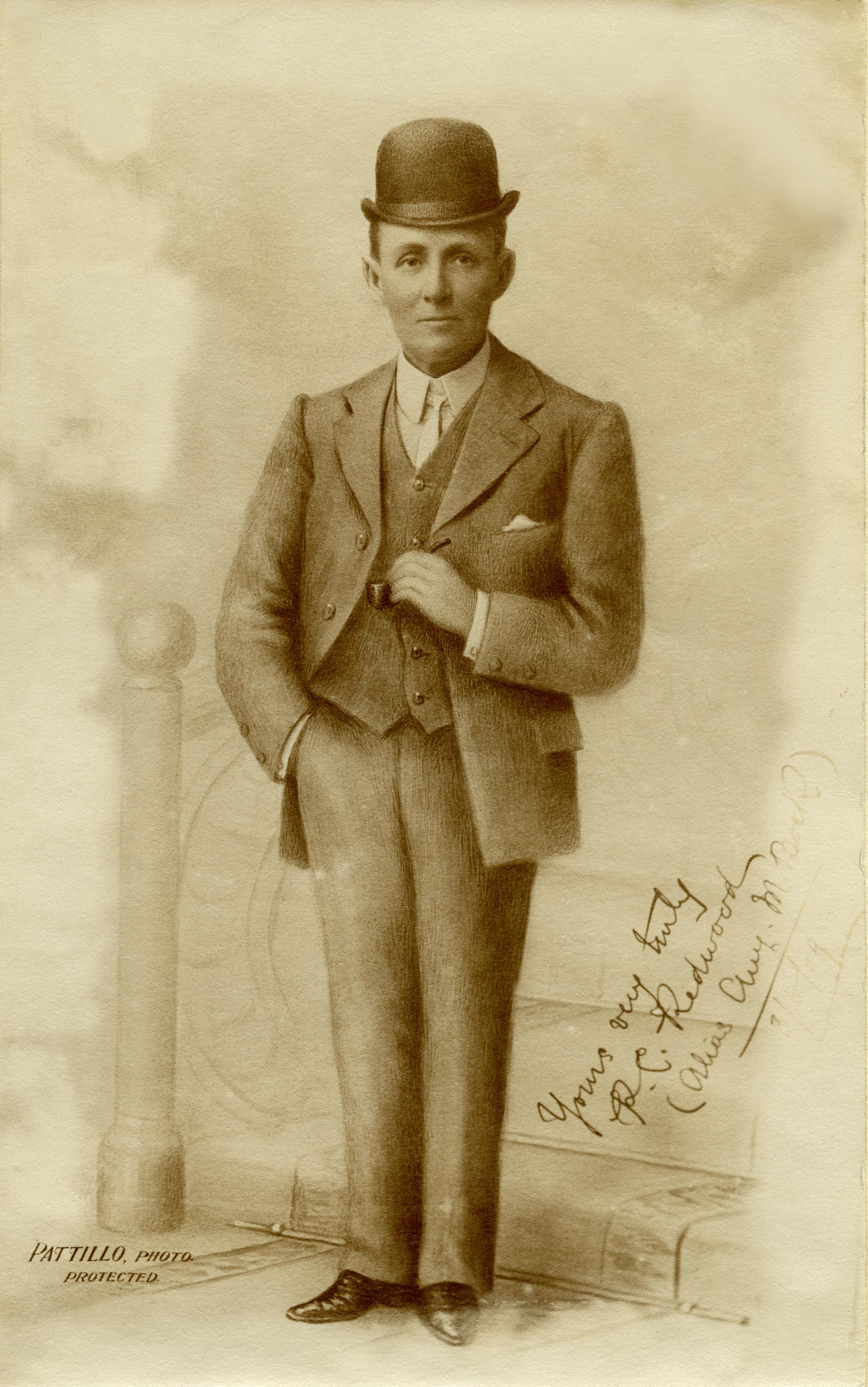
  Image of Amy Bock on whose life Farrell based a play
- The Villa at the Edge of the Empire (Vintage, 2015)

Essays and poetry:

- The Broken Book (Auckland University Press, 2011)

Plays include:

- Chook Chook (Playmarket)
- In Confidence: Dialogues with Amy Bock (Playmarket). Devised for the WSA Conference at Massey University, 1982. Premiered at BATS Theatre.
- Waihi, 1912 (Playmarket)
- Snap! Adapted from Dame Ngaio Marsh’s novel Photo Finish.
