= Judge Matthews =

Judge Matthews may refer to:

- Annabel Matthews (1883–1960), judge of the United States Board of Tax Appeals
- Burnita Shelton Matthews (1894–1988), judge of the United States District Court for the District of Columbia
- Clifton Mathews (1880–1962), judge of the United States Court of Appeals for the Ninth Circuit

== See also ==
- Justice Matthews (disambiguation)
