= Matthew (surname) =

Other names
- Variant forms: Mathew; Matthew; Matthews

Matthew and its variant Mathew occur (although less commonly than Matthews) as a surname, derived from the given name Matthew.

Notable people with the surname include:

- Abish Mathew (1987-Present), Indian talk show host.
- Alexander Small Matthew (1884–1969), Scottish-born insurance company manager and political figure in British Columbia
- Amenta Matthew (born 1952), Marshallese politician
- Andy Matthew (1932–1992), Scottish footballer
- Annu Palakunnathu Matthew (born 1964), professor of art (photography) in the University of Rhode Island
- Arthur Gordon Matthew CBE DSO (1898–1947), British Royal Artillery officer who served in both World Wars
- Babaoye Olaitan Matthew (born 1968), Nigerian Politician
- Brian Matthew (1928–2017), English broadcaster
- Catriona Matthew (born 1969), Scottish professional golfer
- Christian Matthew (born 1996), American football player
- Christopher Matthew (born 1939), British writer and broadcaster
- Colin Matthew (1941–1999), British historian and academic
- Damian Matthew (born 1970), English football manager and former player
- Dayna Bowen Matthew (fl. 1980s–2020s), American law school dean
- George Frederick Matthew (1837–1923), Canadian botanist and geologist
- Henry Matthew (1837–1898), British Anglican colonial bishop
- James Matthew, 19th century Scottish footballer
- Mervin Matthew (born 1985), member of the West Indies cricket team
- Nick Matthew OBE (born 1980), English professional squash player
- Patrick Matthew (1790–1874), Scottish grain merchant, fruit farmer, forester, and landowner
- Ray Mathew (1929–2002), Australian poet in America
- Sir Robert Matthew (1906–1975), Scottish architect
- Scott Matthew (fl. 1990s–2020s), singer-songwriter born in Queensland, Australia
- Thomas Matthew (fl. 1640s–1660s), English merchant and politician who sat in the House of Commons in 1640
- Tobias Matthew (1546–1628), archbishop of York, statesman and writer
- Sir Tobie Matthew (1577–1655), courtier, diplomat and writer
- Wayne Matthew (born 1958), former Australian politician
- Wentworth Arthur Matthew (1892–1973), a West Indian immigrant to New York City, founded a Black Hebrew congregation
- William Diller Matthew FRS (1871–1930), vertebrate paleontologist who worked primarily on mammal fossils

== See also ==
- Matthew (name)
