= James Mathews =

James Mathews may refer to:

- James Mathews (American politician) (1805–1887), member of the US House of Representatives from Ohio
- James Mathews (Australian politician) (1865–1934), Australian politician
- James Mathews (rugby league) (1968–1992), Australian rugby player
- James M. Mathews, Chancellor of New York University (NYU)
- James McFarlane Mathews (1785–1870), American clergyman in New York City

== See also ==
- James Mathew (born 1961), Indian politician
- James Matthews (disambiguation)
