= Matthews =

Matthews may refer to:

== People ==
- Matthews (surname)

== Places ==
- Matthews Island, Antarctica
- Matthews Range, Kenya
- Mount Matthews, New Zealand

=== United States ===
- Matthews, Georgia
- Matthews, Indiana
- Matthews, Maryland
- Matthews, Missouri
- Matthews, New Jersey
- Matthews, North Carolina
- Matthews, Texas
- St. Matthews, Kentucky
- Camp Calvin B. Matthews, former US Marine Corps rifle range

== Other uses ==
- Matthews (film), a 2017 documentary film about British footballer Sir Stanley Matthews

== See also ==
- Mathews (disambiguation)
- Matthew (disambiguation)
- Justice Matthews (disambiguation)
