= Jason Lowrie =

New Zealand rugby league footballer and coach

Personal information
- Full name: Jason Anthony Lowrie
- Born: 22 January 1970 (age 56) Auckland, New Zealand

Playing information
- Height: 184 cm (6 ft 0 in)
- Weight: 103 kg (16 st 3 lb)
- Position: Prop
Club
Years	Team	Pld	T	G	FG	P
1993–98	Sydney Roosters	105	0	0	0	0
1999	Balmain Tigers	24	0	0	0	0
2000–01	Wests Tigers	31	2	0	0	8
	Total	160	2	0	0	8
Representative
Years	Team	Pld	T	G	FG	P
1990–91	New Zealand Māori
1992–??	Auckland
1993–00	New Zealand	16	2	0	0	8
1997	Rest of the World	1	0	0	0	0

Jason Anthony Lowrie (born 22 January 1970) is a New Zealand rugby league coach and former player who represented New Zealand.

== Background ==
He is the grand-nephew of fellow international Sam Lowrie who was a hooker for Ponsonby in the 1910s and 20s, and played for Auckland and New Zealand.

== Playing career ==
A Northcote Tigers junior, Lowrie in 1990 he represented the New Zealand Māori against Great Britain. He then played club football in Australia for the Sydney Roosters, Balmain and the Wests Tigers. Lowrie was a New Zealand international between 1993 and 2000 and played for New Zealand at the 1995 Rugby League World Cup. He also competed for Rest of the World during the Super League war. Lowrie was selected for the New Zealand team to compete in the end of season 1999 Rugby League Tri-Nations tournament. In the final against Australia he played from the interchange bench in the Kiwis' 22-20 loss.

== Coaching career ==
Lowrie was co-coach of Harbour League in the Bartercard Cup alongside Ken McIntosh

In 2010 and 2011 Lowrie was the assistant coach for the Auckland Vulcans.
