= Dr. James O. Matthews Office =

- U.S. National Register of Historic Places
- Location within North Carolina Location within the United States
- Location: SR 1960 S of SR 1004, near Taylors Bridge, North Carolina
- Coordinates: 34°51′53″N 78°15′12″W
- Area: less than one acre
- Built: c. 1900
- MPS: Sampson County MRA
- NRHP reference No.: 86000568
- Added to NRHP: March 17, 1986

Dr. James O. Matthews Office was a historic doctor's office located near Taylors Bridge, Sampson County, North Carolina. It was built about 1900, and was a two-bay-by-two-bay, two-room frame office with a front gable roof. It featured a pedimented porch which is supported by two octagonal columns made from a solid log. It has been demolished.

It was added to the National Register of Historic Places in 1986.
