= Steve Matthews (rugby league) =

New Zealand rugby league footballer

Personal information
- Born: New Zealand

Playing information
- Position: Wing
Representative
Years	Team	Pld	T	G	FG	P
1998–05	New Zealand Māori	1	0	0	0	0

Steve Matthews is a New Zealand former rugby league footballer who represented Aotearoa Māori in the 2000 World Cup.

== Playing career ==
Matthews played for the Glenora Bears in the Auckland Rugby League competition and in 1998 he toured the Cook Islands and Papua New Guinea with the New Zealand Māori side. He was one of only five players that toured both countries.

In 1999 he again toured Papua New Guinea with the New Zealand Māori before being selected to play against the Great Britain Lions in a curtain raiser to the final of the Rugby League Tri-Nations.

He was selected in the Aotearoa Māori squad for the 2000 Rugby League World Cup and played in one match, against Samoa.

In 2001, he joined the Hibiscus Coast Raiders and played in the side that won the 2001 Bartercard Cup. He remained with the Raiders for the 2002 Bartercard Cup.

In 2005 he against played for New Zealand Māori, in a 26-all draw with the Cook Islands.
