= James McFarlane Mathews =

American clergyman

James McFarlane Mathews was an American clergyman prominent in New York City. Born in Salem, New York on 18 March 1785, he died in New York City on 28 January 1870. He was graduated from Union College in 1803, and at the theological seminary of the Associate Reformed Presbyterian Church in 1807, and was associate professor of biblical literature in John M. Mason's theological seminary in 1812. He founded the South Dutch Reformed church in Garden Street, in which charge he continued till 1840. In 1835 he built the Washington Square church, a branch of the South Dutch church.

Mathews grew up in the Associate Reformed Church, and in 1807 he was licensed and subsequently ordained by its New York Presbytery. Upon his accepting a call from the South Dutch church and his consequent departure from the Associate Reformed communion, a question arose in the latter church regarding Mathews' finances, as he had been largely supported by church funds while a seminarian. The question was referred to General Synod, which unanimously ruled that in future cases comparable to Mathews', no minister should be permitted to depart until he had arranged for the repayment of the assistance that he had received from the church.

From 1840 until his death, Mathews held no pastorate, but was active in ecclesiastical affairs, devoted much time to the cause of education, and delivered a series of lectures to students. He was a founder of the University of New York, and its first chancellor, holding office in 1831–1839. He organized and presided over the Christian union council, which met in New York in 1870, and his exertions in its behalf hastened his death. He was in official life for more than fifty years, and was a successful teacher and preacher. He received the degree of D.D. from Yale in 1823. Dr. Mathews was the author of What is Your Life? (New York, 1840); The Bible and Men of Learning (1855); The Bible and Civil Government (1858); and Fifty Years in New York (1858). His daughters, Joanna H. and Julia, also wrote Sunday-school and juvenile books.
