= David A. Matthews =

- Born: March 7, 1847; Boston, Massachusetts
- Died: September 12, 1923 (aged 76); Worcester, Massachusetts
- Military career
- Allegiance: (United States) United States; Union
- Branch: United States Army; Union Army
- Rank: Corporal
- Units: Company E, 8th U.S. Cavalry
- Conflicts: American Civil War; Indian Wars
- Awards: Medal of Honor

David A. Matthews was an American soldier who was awarded the Medal of Honor for his actions during the Indian Campaigns. Matthews was born March 7, 1847, in Boston, Massachusetts. He served in the United States Army as a corporal in Company E of the 8th U.S. Cavalry. Mathews died in Worcester, Massachusetts, on September 12, 1923.

== Medal of Honor Citation ==
Matthews' Medal of Honor citation reads as follows:

The President of the United States of America, in the name of Congress, takes pleasure in presenting the Medal of Honor to Corporal David A. Matthews, United States Army, for bravery in scouts and actions against Indians during 1868 and 1869, while serving with Company E, 8th U.S. Cavalry, in action at Arizona Territory.
