= David Matthews (footballer) =

English footballer (born 1965)

Personal information
- Full name: David Matthews
- Date of birth: 20 November 1965 (age 60)
- Place of birth: Hackney, England
- Position: Forward

Youth career
- West Ham United

Senior career*
Years	Team	Apps	(Gls)
1982–1985	West Ham United	0	(0)
1985–1987	Basildon United		
1987–1988	Walsall	0	(0)
1988–1989	Southend United	6	(0)
- Dagenham
- Purfleet
- Billericay Town
- East Thurrock United
- Heybridge Swifts
1996–1997	Chelmsford City	5	(0)
- * Club domestic league appearances and goals

David Matthews (born 20 November 1965) is an English former footballer who played as a forward.

== Career ==
Matthews began his career at West Ham United, signing his first professional deal with the club on 29 November 1982. Matthews failed to break into the first team at West Ham, making 56 appearances for the reserves, scoring eleven times, over the course of four seasons. Following his time at West Ham, Matthews dropped into non-League football, signing for Basildon United. In November 1987, Walsall signed Matthews. Failing to make an appearance for Walsall, Matthews returned down south, signing for Southend United in March 1988. At Southend, Matthews made six Football League appearances.

Following his time at Southend, Matthews returned to non-league, signing for Dagenham. Matthews later played for Purfleet, Billericay Town, East Thurrock United, Heybridge Swifts and Chelmsford City.
