= HG Matthews Brickworks =

British brick manufacturer

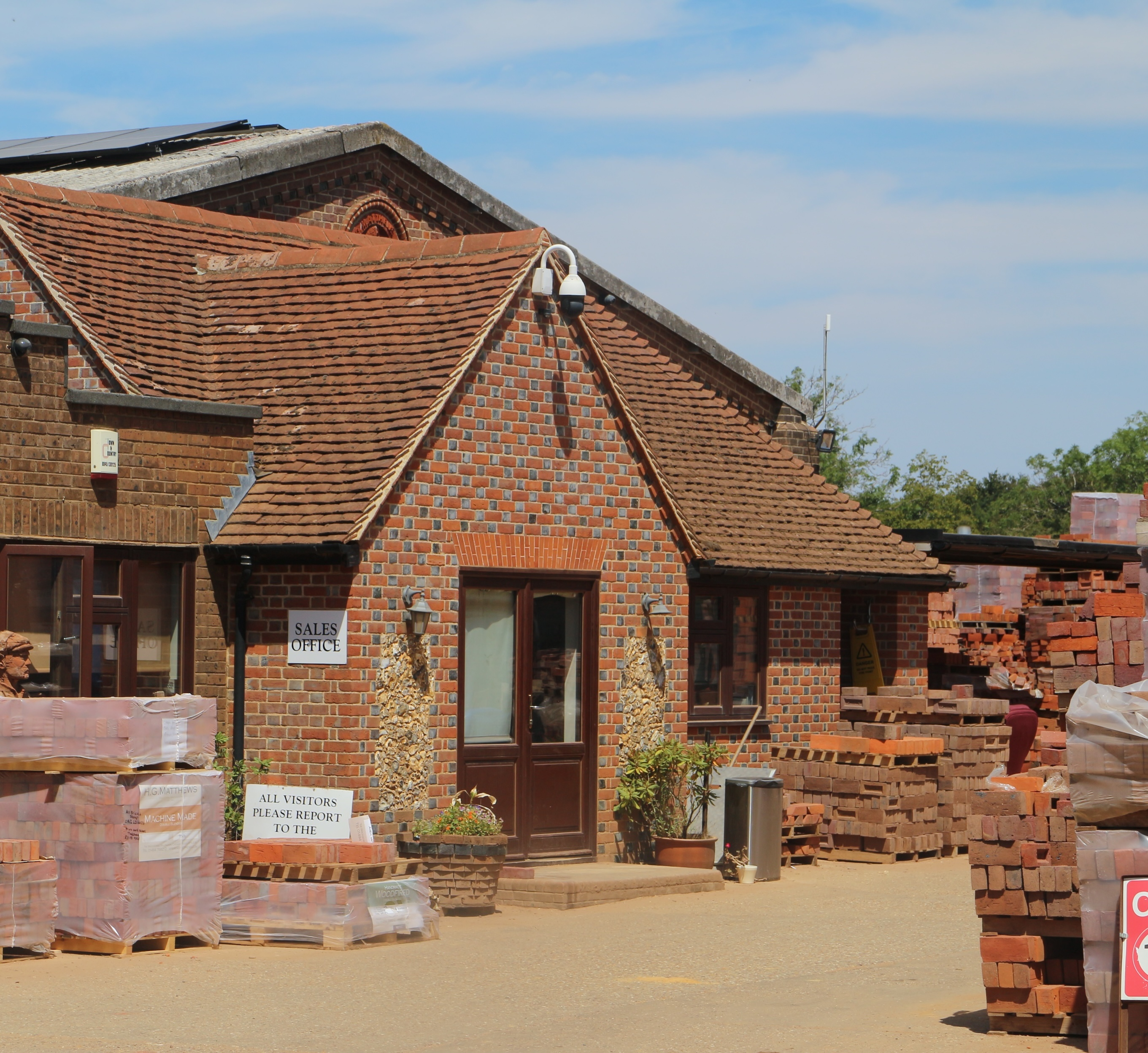
- Office in Bellingdon
- Industry: Building materials
- Founded: 1923
- Fate: Active
- Headquarters: Bellingdon, UK
- Website: hgmatthews.com

HG Matthews Brickworks is a traditional independent brick manufacturer based in Bellingdon, Buckinghamshire, UK. It specialises in traditional brickmaking.

The company was originally founded by Henry George Matthews in 1923 and has continued to be a family-run company into the 21st century. The last brickworks still active in Buckinghamshire, its management have recently emphasised the firm's traditional workmanship and ecological credentials. A large number of dwellings in South Buckinghamshire have been built using its bricks, including recently constructed homes. It has supplied custom-made bricks for historical buildings, including Hampton Court Palace and Chequers, and unfired earth bricks for reduced environmental impact. The brickworks is presently headed by Jim Matthews, the grandson of Henry George Matthews.

== History ==
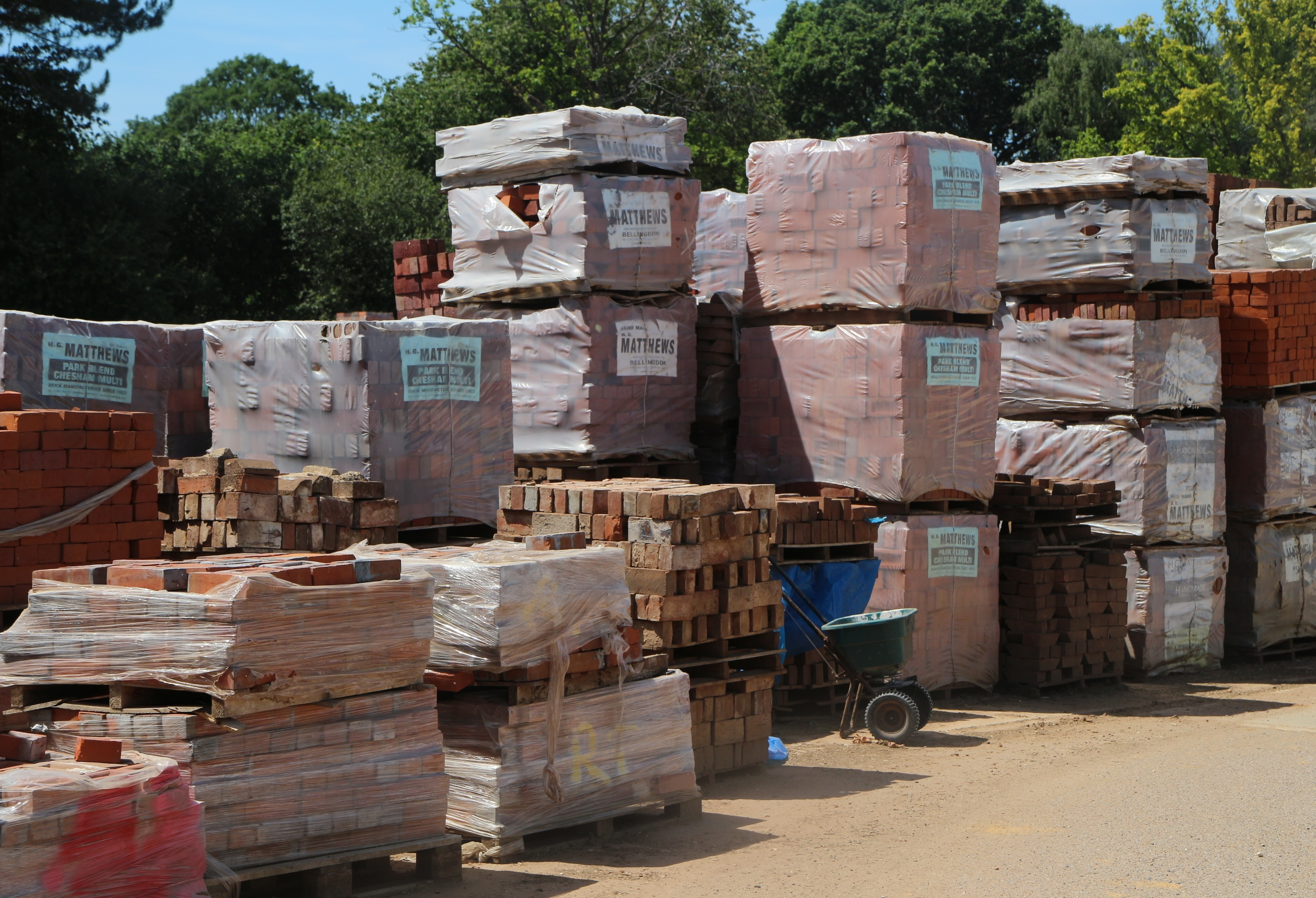
Brick pallets in Bellingdon, 2026

HD Matthews was originally established in 1923 by Henry George Matthews to produce bricks. From the onset of operations in the 1920s through to the 21st century, its brickworks has made use of the indigenous iron-rich clay of the Chiltern Hills, which is still being sourced from the same deposits around the village of Bellingdon. It was once one of 50 brickworks in Buckinghamshire; however, it was the only active one remaining in the county by 2026. Its existence stands in contrast to the majority of the UK's brick manufacturing sector, which underwent consolidation during the 1990s and 2000s.

HG Matthews has remained a relatively traditional smaller-scale family-run brickworks into the 21st century. By 2014, the company was being managed by Jim Matthews, the grandson of Henry George Matthews. HD Matthews was reportedly producing 12,000 machine-made bricks alongside 8,000 handmade bricks each day by 2018, the latter using methods that have changed little since the company's founding. It has routinely been contracted to produce custom-order bricks for various historic buildings. Accordingly, HD Matthews's bricks have been used in various high-profile buildings, including Hampton Court Palace and Chequers.

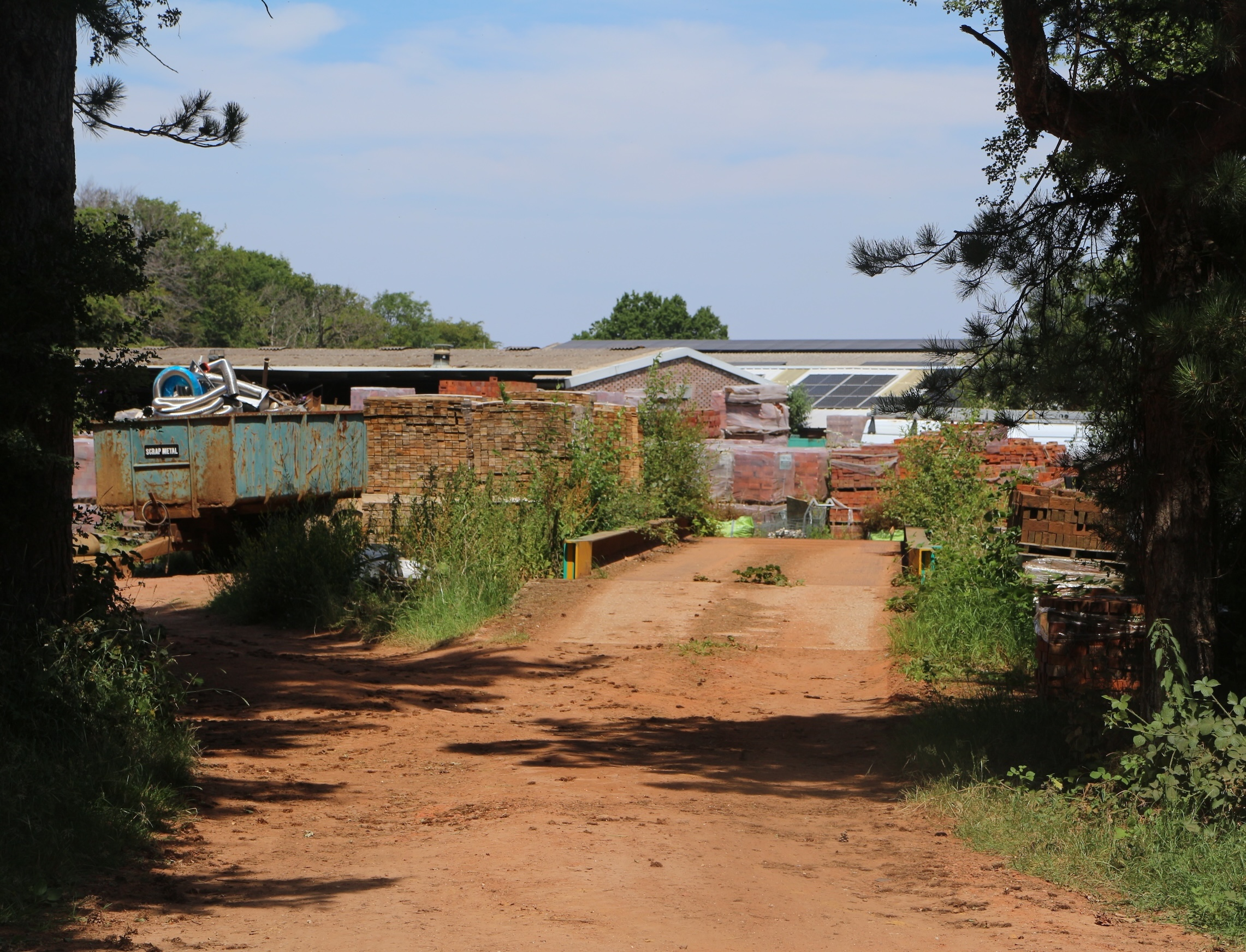
Brick works and solar panels

The company's bricks can be found across many of the houses in South Buckinghamshire. Almost all new build homes in the Chiltern area are built of bricks supplied by HG Matthews.

By 2006, in response to oil prices doubling within the space of two years, the company was reportedly planning to introduce biofuels as an alternate fuel for its kiln. Four years later, work was underway to construct a wood-burning kiln that would reduce the company's reliance on oil. In 2014, it was reported that HG Matthews had shipped its first wood-fired bricks to both the United States and Japan. A few years later, the company started producing unfired earth-based blocks for even greater sustainability. Other ecological activities include reforestation and landscape restoration.
