= Annie Elizabeth Gordon =

Salvation Army officer, rescue home matron, probation officer

Annie Elizabeth Gordon (20 July 1873–28 May 1951) was a New Zealand salvation army officer, rescue home matron and probation officer. She was born in Timaru, South Canterbury, New Zealand on 20 July 1873.
