= Justice Matthews (disambiguation) =

Justice Matthews refers to Stanley Matthews (judge) (1824–1889), associate justice of the United States Supreme Court. Justice Mathews or Matthews may also refer to:

- George Mathews (judge) (1774–1836), justice of the Superior Court of the Territory of Mississippi, justice of the Superior Court of the Territory of Orleans, and Presiding judge of the Louisiana Supreme Court
- Henry Matthews (judge) (1789–1828), puisne justice of the Supreme Court of Ceylon
- Hugh Matthews, Lord Matthews (born 1953), judge of Scotland's Supreme Courts
- John Mathews (judge) (1892–1955), associate justice of the Florida Supreme Court
- John A. Matthews (1876–1966), associate justice of the Montana Supreme Court
- Warren Matthews (born 1939), associate justice and chief justice of the Alaska Supreme Court

== See also ==
- Matthew Justice (born 1988), American professional wrestler
- Judge Matthews (disambiguation)
