= Alfons Masella =

Tongan rugby league footballer

Personal information
- Born: Tonga

Playing information
- Position: Prop, Second-row
Representative
Years	Team	Pld	T	G	FG	P
1999–2000	Tonga	3	0	0	0	0
- Source: RLP

Alfons Masella is a Tongan rugby league footballer who represented Tonga in the 2000 World Cup.

== Playing career ==
While playing lower grades for St George Illawarra, Masella was selected for Tonga in the 2000 World Cup. He also represented Tonga in 1999, in a Test match against the New Zealand national rugby league team.
