= Tonya Matthews =

American biomedical engineer

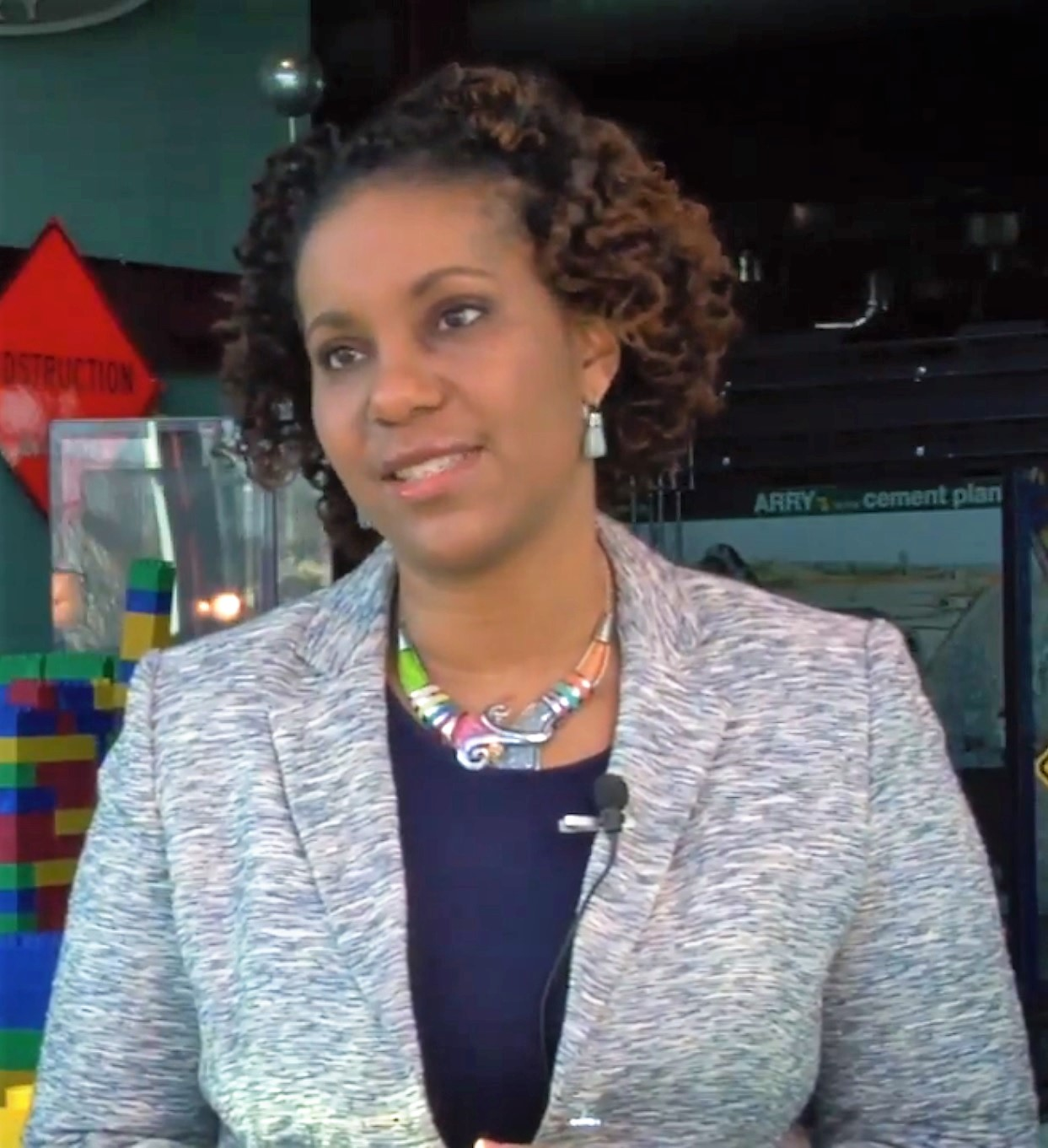
- Matthews speaks for the National Assessment Governing Board in 2017
- Education: Duke University; Johns Hopkins University
- Occupation: Associate Provost for Inclusive Workforce Development
- Employer: Wayne State University

Tonya Matthews is an American biomedical engineer and administrator who serves as the chief executive officer and President of the International African American Museum in Charleston, South Carolina.

She previously served as the CEO and President of Michigan Science Center, where in 2016, she helped launch the STEMinista Project to engage middle school girls about science. Matthews was also the Associate Provost for Inclusive Workforce Development at Wayne State University.

== Early life and education ==
Matthews enjoyed museums as a child. She studied biomedical engineering at Duke University, which she graduated in 1996. During her degree she completed a course in African American studies. She completed her graduate studies at Johns Hopkins University, earning a PhD in 2006. She worked on the DNA of inner ear hair cells. During her graduate studies she worked at the Maryland Science Center.

== Research and career ==
Matthews joined Maryland Science Center, where she created an urban lab in schools program. She worked at the Food and Drug Administration in the division of restorative and neurological devices. After the FDA, Matthews was appointed Vice President of Cincinnati Museum Center at Union Terminal, where she directed research and education. Here she launched the Girls in Real Life Sciences (GIRLS) program. In 2008 she was listed in the Business Courier as one of the top Forty Under 40.

She joined Michigan Science Center as president and CEO in 2013. Under her leadership, Michigan Science Center serves 300,000 children. They launched the STEMinista Project in 2016, which looks to excite middle school girls about science. The program has a database of local women working in STEM who act as mentors and role models to girls. She was awarded an honorary doctorate from Central Michigan University in 2016. She was also recognised as being one of the top 100 men and women in Michigan by the Michigan Chronicle.

In 2019, she joined Wayne State University as Associate Provost for Inclusive Workforce Development.

She was appointed by the United States Secretary of Education to serve on the Governing Board of the National Assessment of Educational Progress. She also serves on the Board of Science Education at the National Academies of Sciences, Engineering, and Medicine. She received the Whitaker Foundation Award for Engineering Excellence. She works closely with the Wayne County Community College District and University of Detroit Mercy. Matthews is also a spoken soul artist, having published and performed poetry notable for its social commentary. She delivered a TEDx talk in Cincinnati: Sound Ideas.
