= Lazar Mathew =

Indian physician

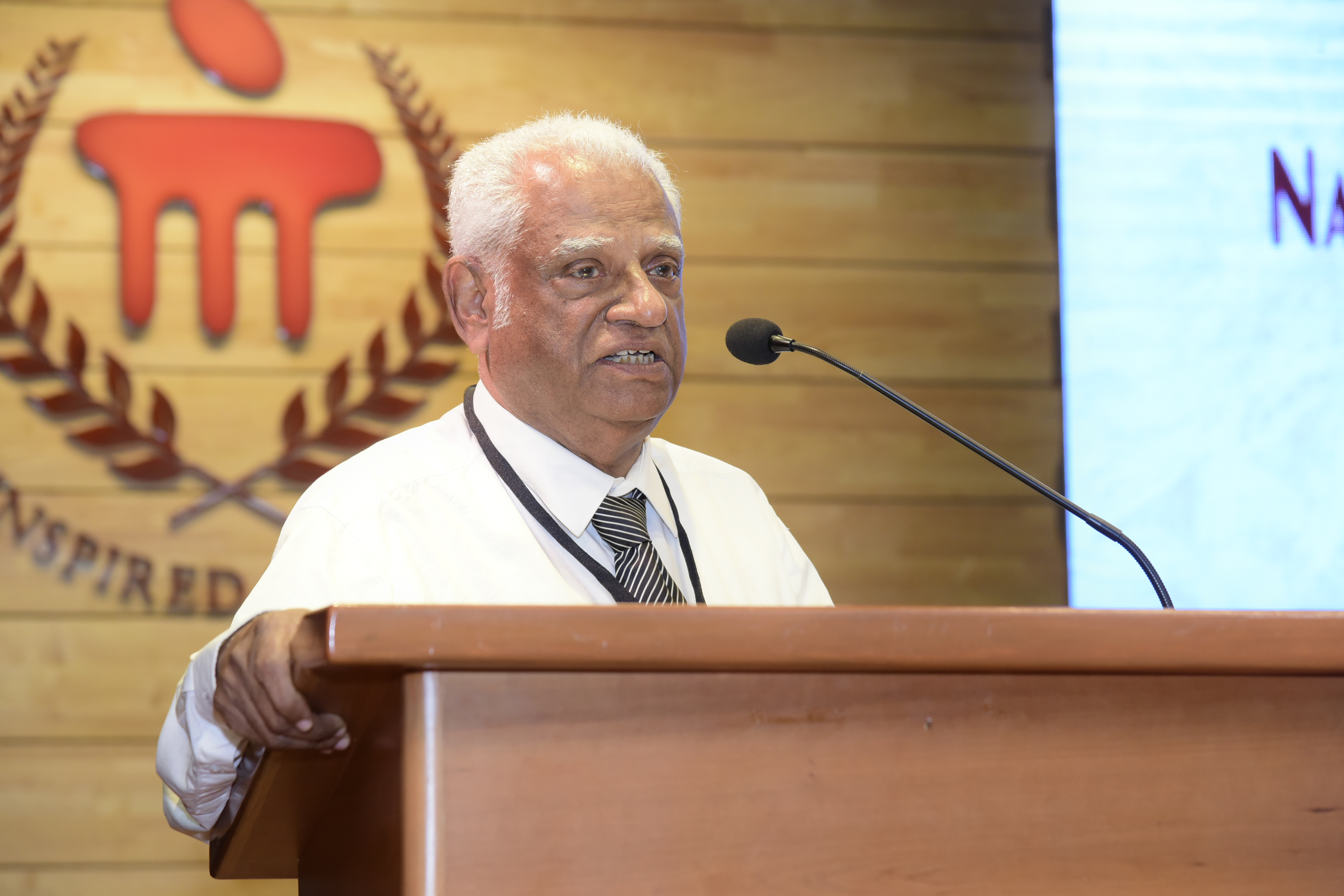
Photograph of Dr. T. Lazar Mathew during his visit to Manipal Academy of Higher Education, Manipal

Dr Lazar Mathew is an Indian scientist and former Director of Defence Research and Development Organisation and Institute of Nuclear Medicine & Allied Sciences. He has also been Director of Defence Bioengineering and Electromedical Laboratory.

Mathew is a fellow of the Indian Academy of Biomedical Sciences, International Medical Sciences Academy, and National Academy of Medical Sciences. In 1994, he was honoured with the DRDO Scientist of the Year Award.

Mathew is serving as an advisor of Medical Sciences and Engineering and Technology at PSG Institute of Medical Sciences & Research, Coimbatore. He has served as the Dean of the School of Biotechnology and Chemical and Biomedical Engineering at VIT University, Vellore.
