= Theobald Mathew =

Theobald Mathew may refer to:

- Theobald Mathew (temperance reformer) (1790–1856), Irish temperance reformer, also known as Father Mathew
- Theobald Mathew (legal humorist) (1866–1939), English barrister and legal humorist, great-nephew of the above
- Sir Theobald Mathew (barrister, born 1898) (1898–1964), English Director of Public Prosecutions, nephew of the above
- Theobald Mathew (officer of arms) (1942–1998), English officer of arms
