= Murder of Jim Matthews =

2022 murder in Michigan, United States

- Location: Chesterfield Township, Michigan
- Date: 23 September 2022; 4 years ago
- Attack type: Homicide
- Weapon: Hammer
- Victim: 1 dead, 3 injured

Jim Nicolai, who worked as a news-radio anchor under the name Jim Matthews, was killed at his home in Chesterfield Township, Michigan in September 2022.

== Victim ==
Jim Matthews was the overnight anchor at Metro Detroit's WWJ-AM known as "Newsradio 950". He had held that position for seven years. He was 57 years old at the time of his death. "Matthews" was the name he used professionally; his legal surname was "Nicolai". He was a graduate of Lutheran High School in Harper Woods, Michigan.

== Killing ==
On September 23, 2022, Matthews was reportedly bludgeoned with a hammer and slit across the throat to death at his home at the Hidden Harbor condominiums in Chesterfield Township. Three family members were also injured in the incident.

- Matthews' girlfriend, Nicole Guertin age 35, was reportedly gagged and slit across the throat, leaving her helpless in the attacks. Despite her injuries, Guertin was able to escape from the home, because of telling her daughter to grab scissors, and cut her free from the chair she was tied to. Carrying her five-year-old daughter.
- The couple's 10-year-old son was discovered by police in a closet at the home. He had sustained blunt force injury to his head and was hospitalized in critical condition.
- The couple's five-year-old daughter was also injured in the incident, sustaining rape injuries that yet the judge did not charge Williamson with.

A fifth individual, Arthur Williamson, was discovered in the basement, reportedly overdosing, foaming at the mouth and had a razor, credit card, a powdery substance on a plate, and straw nearby. He was revived with Narcan and transported for medical attention.

In October 2022, Guertin told the Detroit Free Press that Williamson was a friend who woke her up and seemed depressed. According to police reports obtained by the paper, Williamson called Guertin at approximately 3 a.m. and came to the home at approximately 4 a.m. When Guertin eventually asked Williamson to leave, Guertin stated that he "lost it", pulled a knife, cut her on the neck, and tied her hands and feet with zip ties. When Matthews arrived home from work in the morning, Williamson began stabbing him and hitting him in the head with a hammer. Williamson told police he and Guertin were not dating and were just friends who "do drugs together."

== Prosecution ==
=== Charges ===
Williamson was charged on September 26, 2022, with one count of homicide-murder in the first degree, one count of homicide-felony murder, two counts of assault with intent to murder, and three counts of unlawful imprisonment. He had previous convictions for various violent crimes as well as narcotics related convictions.

=== Preliminary examination ===
In February 2023, Williamson was bound over to stand trial for first-degree murder based on evidence presented at a preliminary examination in the Macomb County Circuit Court in New Baltimore, Michigan.

Nichole Guertin testified that she had an intimate relationship with Williamson, that they smoked crack cocaine before Matthews came home from work, and that the Accused told her "when Jim gets home, I'm gonna kill him." Forensic evidence was also presented showing that Matthews was struck in the head with a hammer more than 20 times and that his throat was also slit.

=== No contest plea and sentence ===
On April 20, 2023, Williamson pleaded no contest in the killing as well as the assaults and the unlawful imprisonments. On June 1, 2023, Williamson was sentenced to life in prison.
