= David Mathew =

David Mathew may refer to:

- Sir David Mathew (1400–1484), Welsh knight and English Standard Bearer
- David Mathew (bishop) (1902–1975), English bishop and historian
- David Mathew (Big Brother), joint winner of Big Brother Australia 2005

== See also ==
- David Matthews (disambiguation)
