= Jim Matthews (footballer, born 1880) =

Australian rules footballer

Personal information
- Full name: James Patrick Slattery Matthews
- Born: 4 June 1880; Fitzroy, Victoria
- Died: 19 May 1940 (aged 59); Prahran, Victoria
- Original team: Celtic

Playing career^{1}
Years	Club	Games (Goals)
1900	Carlton	3 (0)
- ^{1} Playing statistics correct to the end of 1900.

James Patrick Slattery Matthews (4 June 1880 – 19 May 1940) was an Australian rules footballer who played with Carlton in the Victorian Football League (VFL).
