= Jim Matthews (writer) =

New Zealand horticulturist (1895–1982)

James William Matthews (26 September 1895 – 26 March 1982), was a New Zealand newspaper editor, gardening writer, and horticulturist. In the 1940s, he founded the monthly magazine New Zealand Gardener.

== Biography ==
Matthews was born in Ahaura, the son of Elizabeth Agatha (Pothan) Matthews and James Lindsay Matthews, a butcher. He attended Wairoa School in Hawke’s Bay. Between 1915 and 1917, he served in the army, rising to sergeant major. In 1917, Matthews married Esme Elizabeth Hawke; they had a daughter and were divorced in the 1930s.

After World War I, Matthews joined Wellington's daily newspaper, The Dominion, as a junior reporter. Interested in horticulture, he wrote a weekly newspaper column under the pseudonym ‘The Hoe’. He also lectured on horticulture at Victoria University College, was a founding member of the Wellington Beautifying Society (which planted trees around the city), and gave frequent talks on gardening.

Matthews rose to become the paper's first news editor in 1934, remaining in that position for eight years. That same year, Barbara Winifred Silver joined the paper as a cadet reporter; they married in 1938 and had two sons, Lewis and Julian, who both also became horticulturalists and writers.

In 1941, the Matthews coauthored the very successful New Zealand Garden Dictionary, which went through multiple editions between 1941 and 1968. Four years later, they left the newspaper to become freelance writers on gardening and horticultural subjects. Jim started a new weekly column, "Garden with Matthews", that started out in the Dominion and later moved to the Evening Post. His eyesight failed in the late 1960s, at which point Barbara took over the column, writing it until 1987, though it continued to appear under his byline.

In 1944, Matthews founded a new monthly magazine, New Zealand Gardener. Because of wartime paper shortages, a special Act of Parliament was needed to authorize it, and this went through because it was thought that such a magazine would help with food shortages by spurring more people to grow their own vegetables. In addition to editing the magazine and writing for it, he authored several books on gardening subjects.

Matthews was interested in plant breeding and ran a flower business with Barbara that supplied Wellington flower shops with roses, proteas, and other blooms.

In 1964, Matthews was made an associate of honour of the Royal New Zealand Institute of Horticulture.

In the 1950s, Matthews and his family lived in Waikanae on a property where the garden had been designed by the landscape architect Alfred William Buxton.

Matthews died in Porirua in 1982.

== Books ==
- The New Zealand Garden Dictionary (1941, with Barbara Matthews)
- Soil Fertility (1943)
- Garden Treasures (1947)
- Matthews on Gardening (1960)
