= Henry John Matthews =

New Zealand nurseryman and forester (1859–1909)

Henry John Matthews (19 September 1859 – 1909) was a New Zealand nurseryman and forester . He was born in Dunedin, New Zealand on 19 September 1859. He married Grace Annie Gordon on 14 October 1896, in Dunedin.
