= Rayner Matthews =

American motocross racer

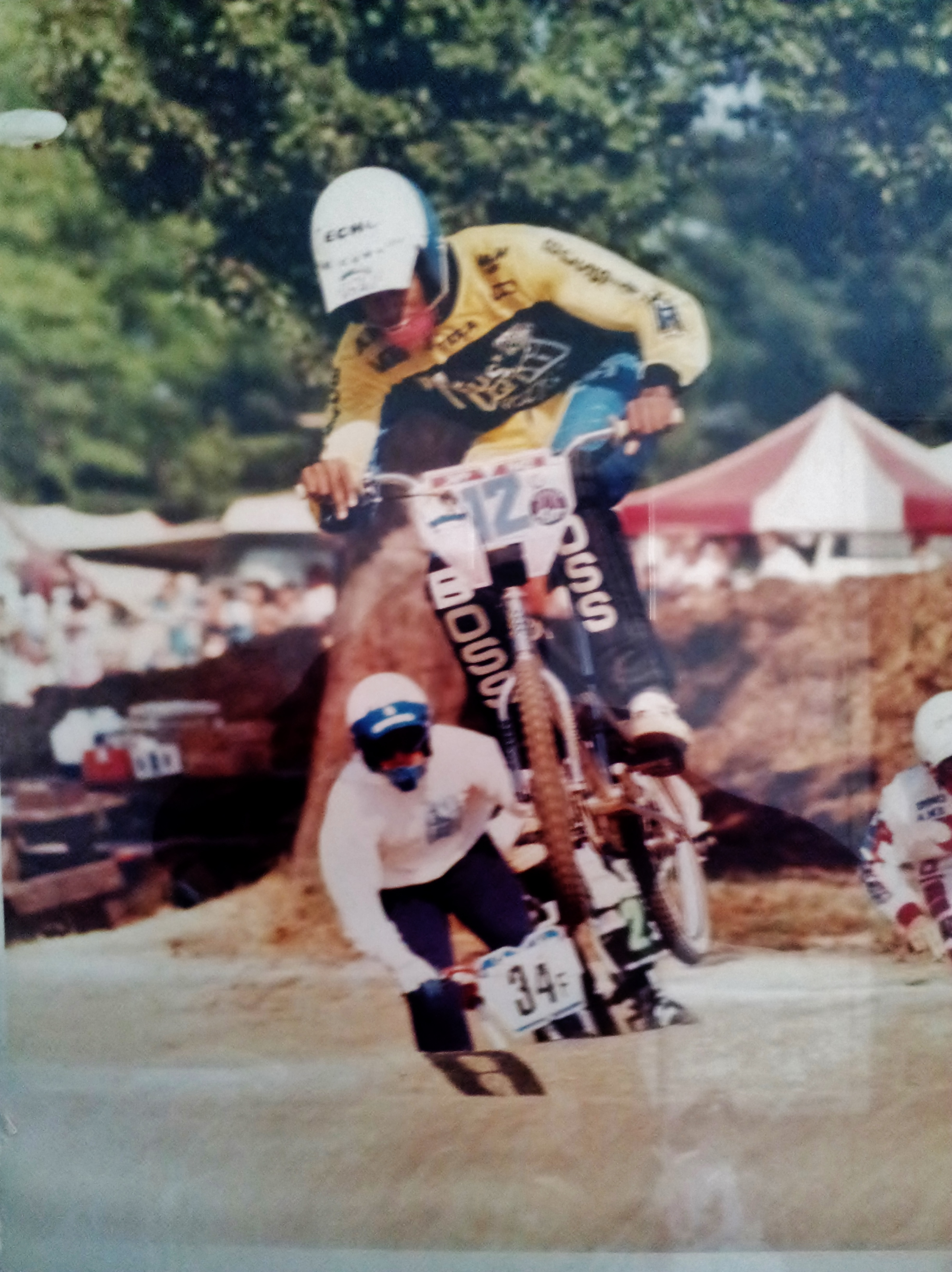
- South Park NBL National 1988

Personal information
- Full name: Rayner Matthews
- Nicknames: "Boss Man", "Racing Rayner"
- Height: 1.93 m (6 ft 4 in)
- Weight: 100 kg (220 lb)

Cycling career
- Sport: Cycling
- Current team: Retired
- Discipline: Bicycle Motocross (BMX)
- Role: Racer
- Rider type: Off Road

Amateur teams
- 1987: ELF Racing
- 1988: Boss Racing
- 1989: L & S Racing
- 1990: L & S Racing
- 1990: White Bear Racing

Professional teams
- 1991: Supercross Racing
- 1991: Goodtime Racing

Rayner Matthews is a former American "Old/Mid School" Bicycle Motocross (BMX) racer whose prime competitive years were from 1984 to 1991.

His nickname "Boss Man" was given to him while being a member of the Boss Racing team and the way he performed in his class (17 expert) during 1989. During 1990 he participated in eighteen National Bicycle League (NBL) Nationals as an 18 Expert while riding for L & S Racing Products and White Bear Racing, he won fifteen mains. Also, during 1990 Rayner rode for both L & S Racing (for ABA) and White Bear Racing (for NBL) at the same time. He was known for his power and great gate starts. He was considered to be a super fast 18 Expert by Supercross BMX Products.

== Racing career ==
Milestone	Event Details
Started racing:	At age 12 in early 1983 at the Howard County track in West Friendship, Maryland. He just enjoyed riding bicycles fast. His first bicycle was a Mongoose from a local department store. Before BMX he played football and basketball.
Sanctioning body:	
First race bike:	Mongoose
First race result:	
Home sanctioning body district(s):	American Bicycle Association (ABA) Maryland 1983-1990
First win (local):	
First sponsor:	Princeton Sports
First national race result:	Did not transfer (missed moto 2) at the 1985 National Bicycle League (NBL) in Brookville, Ohio
First national win:	Day 2 at the 1986 National Bicycle Leaque (NBL)in Dayton, Ohio
Turned Professional:	January 1990 at 19 years of age (NBL Super Class only)
First Professional race result:	
First Professional win:	
Height and weight at height of his career:	Ht:6'4" Wt:220 lbs.
Retired:	1990, just before the National Bicycle Leaque (NBL) Grands

=== Career factory and major bike shop sponsors ===
Note: This listing only denotes the racer's primary sponsors. At any given time a racer could have numerous ever changing co-sponsors. Primary sponsorships can be verified by BMX press coverage and sponsor's advertisements at the time in question. When possible, exact dates are given.

==== Amateur ====
- ELF Racing Products: 1987
- Boss Racing Products: 1988
- L & S Racing Products: 1989
- L & S Racing Products (ABA): 1990
- White Bear Products (NBL): 1990

==== Professional ====
- Supercross BMX Products: 1990
- Goodtime Racing: 1990

=== Career bicycle motocross titles ===
Note: Listed are District, State/Provincial/Department, Regional, National, and International titles in italics. "Defunct" refers to the fact of that sanctioning body in question no longer existing at the start of the racer's career or at that stage of his/her career. Depending on point totals of individual racers, winners of Grand Nationals do not necessarily win National titles. Series and one off Championships are also listed in block.

==== Amateur ====
National Bicycle Association (NBA)

- None

National Bicycle League (NBL)

- 1985 Delaware State Champion
- 1987 16 & Over Open Grandnational (first racer to win this race at the age of 16)
- 1988 17 Expert Grandnational Champion

American Bicycle Association (ABA)

- None

==== Professional ====
National Bicycle Association (NBA)

National Bicycle League (NBL)

American Bicycle Association (ABA)

United States Bicycle Motocross Association (USBA)

International Bicycle Motocross Federation (IBMXF)

Pro Series Championships

=== Notable accolades ===
- 1987, he became the first BMX racer to win the 16 & Over Open NBL Grandnational at the age of sixteen.
- 1889, he participated in eighteen National Bicycle League (NBL) Nationals as an 18 Expert and won fifteen.

== BMX press magazine interviews and articles ==
- "Ryner(Rayner) Matthews, Bios" BMX Action December 1990
