= Hywel ap Syr Mathew =

Welsh poet, genealogist and soldier (born before 1523–1581)

Hywel ap Syr Mathew (died 1581) was a Welsh poet, genealogist and soldier.

He originated from Radnorshire in the valley of the River Teme at Llanfair Waterdine.

== Poetry ==
Hywel ap Syr Mathew composed many cywyddau written to among others, Bishop Richard Davies, William Herbert, Earl of Pembroke, Mathew ap Moris of Ceri (Kerry, Powys), Siencyn ap Dafydd of Llanarthney and an awdl to Lewys Gwyn of Glyn Nedd, Glynneath near Neath.

His poems survive in several medieval Welsh manuscripts.

== Soldier ==
He was present at the Siege of Boulogne in 1544-1546

== Welsh genealogist ==
Hywel ap Syr Mathew also composed Welsh genealogical manuscripts and detailed pedigrees, some used later by other students such as Lewys Dwnn.
