= James S. Matthews =

Louisiana state representative

James S. Matthews (fl. 1870s) was a state legislator in the state of Louisiana. Matthews chaired the House Committee on Public Lands. He also chaired a committee investigating "revolutionary" activity in the House in January 1875 following the November 4, 1874 election.

Matthews also served as a justice of the peace and was involved in signing off on a parish ballot box.
