= H. Spencer Matthews =

United States admiral

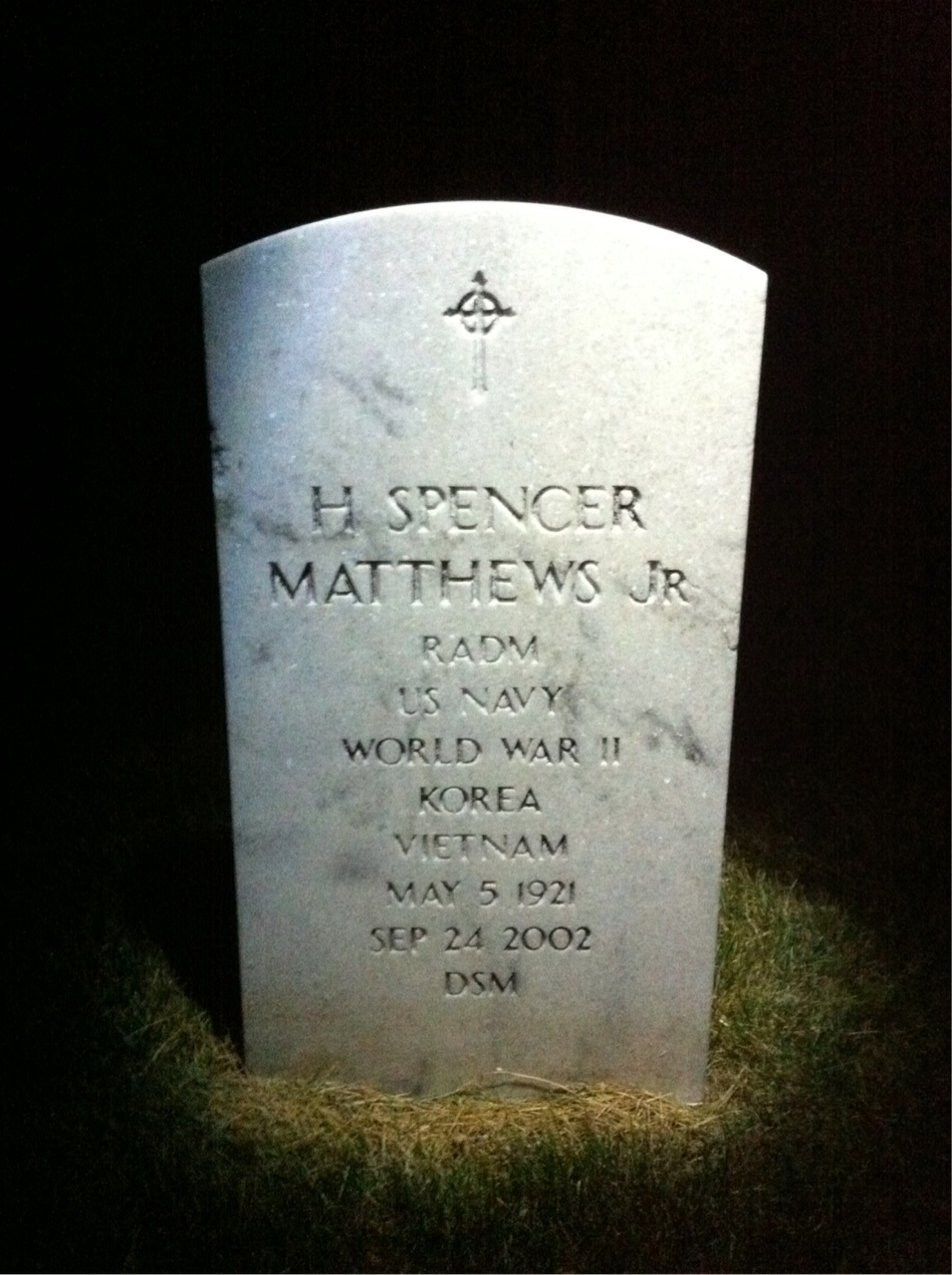
Grave at Arlington National Cemetery

Rear Admiral H. Spencer Matthews Jr. (May 5, 1921 – September 24, 2002) was the first Naval Aviation Pilot to be promoted to flag rank in the Navy. He graduated number one in his class of 500 aviation cadets. In operational training he received a commendation for being the first student to complete the celestial navigation course with a perfect grade. He served five combat tours in the Vietnam War including tours as the deputy commander of U.S. Navy Forces Vietnam and as the Vice Chief of the Vietnamese navy. He was the president of four small companies and served on the board of directors of two corporations.

== Military decorations ==
- Distinguished Service Medal (v)
- Legion of Merit
- Bronze Star Medal (v)
- Air Medals (12)
- Joint Service Commendation Medal and Navy Commendation Medal
- 12 Foreign Medals, including the highest awards given by South Vietnam and Cambodia.

== References and notes ==
- Arlington National Cemetery obituary
