= Mathews (surname) =

Mathews is a surname. Notable persons with that surname include:

- Alfred Augustus Mathews (1864–1946), vicar and Wales international rugby player, 1864-1946
- Angelo Mathews (born 1987), Sri Lankan Burgher cricketer
- Annie Mathews (1866–1959), American politician
- Arthur Mathews (writer) (born 1959), Irish comedy writer
- Arthur Frank Mathews (1860–1945), American painter
- Basil Joseph Mathews (1879–1951), English historian
- Bill Mathews (1919–2003), Canadian geologist
- Carl Mathews (1903–1959), American character actor and stuntman
- Carmen Mathews (1911–1995), American actress and environmentalist
- Carole Mathews (1920–2014), American actress
- Charles Mathews (1776–1835), English theatre manager and comic actor
- Cornelius Mathews (1817–1889), 19th-century American writer
- David Mathews (1739–1800), Loyalist mayor of New York, 1776-1783
- Delia Mathews (born 1990), New Zealand-born ballet dancer
- Eddie Mathews (1931–2001), Hall of Fame third baseman in Major League Baseball
- Elbert G. Mathews (1910–1977), American diplomat
- Francine Mathews (born 1963), American novelist
- Garrison Mathews (born 1996), American basketball player for the Atlanta Hawks
- George Mathews (disambiguation), several people
- Gregory Mathews (1876–1949), Australian amateur ornithologist
- Harry Mathews (1930–2017), American author
- Henry M. Mathews (1834–1884), governor of West Virginia, 1877-1881
- James Mathews (disambiguation), several people
- Jane Mathews (1940–2019), Australian judge
- Janet Mathews (1914–1992), Australian musician and linguist
- Jay Mathews (born 1945), author, education reporter and online columnist with the Washington Post
- Jermaine Mathews Jr. (born 2005), American football player
- Jessica Mathews (born 1946), president of the Carnegie Endowment for International Peace
- John David Mathews, American engineer
- Jon Mathews (1932–1979), academic
- Jonathan Mathews, baseball coach
- Kevin Mathews (born 1961), Singaporean musician and songwriter
- Larry Mathews, Irish musician
- Lloyd Mathews (1850–1901), British naval officer, politician and abolitionist
- Marlene Mathews (born 1934), Australian sprinter
- Max Mathews (1926–2011), computer music pioneer
- Nancy Mowll Mathews (born 1947), Czech-American art historian, curator, and author
- Oliver Mathews (c. 1520–c. 1618), Welsh apothecary and chronicler
- Race Mathews (1935–2025), Australian politician, academic, and author
- Robert Jay Mathews (1953–1984), American neo-Nazi
- Robert L. Mathews (1887–1947), American football player and coach
- Ross Mathews (born 1979), American television personality
- Sampson Mathews (c. 1737–1807), politician, Revolutionary War soldier
- Sherin Mathews (2014–2017), Indian American toddler who was found dead in a culvert
- Sylvia Mathews Burwell (born 1965), President of the Global Development Program of the Bill and Melinda Gates Foundation
- Thomas Mathews (1676–1751), Royal Navy admiral
- Vera Laughton Mathews (1888–1959), Director of the Women's Royal Naval Service from 1940 until 1946
- Walter J. Mathews (1850–1947), American architect
- William Mathews (disambiguation), several people

== See also ==
- Mathews I or Baselios Marthoma Mathews I (1907–1996), Supreme Primate of Malankara Church, also known as Indian Orthodox Church
- Mathews II or Baselios Marthoma Mathews II (1915–2006) was the Supreme Primate of the Malankara Church, also known as Indian Orthodox Church
- Mathews family, an American political family descended from John Mathews
- Mathews (disambiguation)
- Sir David ap Mathew
