= Alfred William Buxton =

Alfred William Buxton (17 September 1872–22 August 1950) was a New Zealand landscape gardener and nurseryman. He was born in Hanley, Staffordshire, England on 17 September 1872 and moved to New Zealand in about 1886 where he began his work as a nurseryman.
