= List of Adelaide Rams players =

This is a list of rugby league footballers who have played first grade for the Adelaide Rams. Players are listed in the order they made their debut.

These lists encompass player records from the:

- Super League competition, 1997.
- World Club Challenge competition, 1997.
- National Rugby League competition, 1998.

== List of players ==
No.	Name	Pos.	Debut	Seasons	Previous club	Next club	App	T	G	FG	Pts
1	Michael Maguire	FB/WG	1 March	1997	Canberra Raiders	Canberra Raiders	7	1	0	0	4
2	Wayne Simonds	WG	1 March	1997–98	South Queensland Crushers		25†	8	0	0	32
3	Solomon Kiri	CE	1 March	1997	Western Reds		13†	5	0	0	20
4	Elias Paiyo	CE	1 March	1997	Port Moresby Vipers		6	0	0	0	0
5	Joe Tamani	WG	1 March	1997–98	Bradford Bulls		22	6	0	0	24
6	Kurt Wrigley	FE/CE	1 March	1997	St. George Dragons		18†	6	36	1	97
7	Stuart Topper	HB	1 March	1997	Gold Coast Seagulls		6	1	0	0	4
8	Andrew Hick	PR	1 March	1997–98	Western Suburbs Magpies	Gateshead Thunder	38†	4	0	0	16
9	Kerrod Walters	HK	1 March	1997–98	Brisbane Broncos	Gateshead Thunder	43	5	0	0	20
10	Marty McKenzie	PR	1 March	1997–98	Parramatta Eels		19	2	0	0	8
11	Dave Boughton	SR	1 March	1997–98	Cronulla Sharks	Huddersfield Giants	19	1	0	0	4
12	Brett Galea	SR	1 March	1997–98	Brisbane Broncos		22†	4	0	0	16
13	Cameron Blair	LK	1 March	1997	Western Reds		18	4	0	0	16
14	Kevin Campion	PR/SR	1 March	1997	St. George Dragons	Brisbane Broncos	15	1	0	0	4
15	Chris Quinn	FB/CE/FE	1 March	1997–98	St. George Dragons	Parramatta Eels	36†	6	0	0	24
16	Steve Stone	HB	1 March	1997	Canberra Raiders		17†	8	0	0	32
17	Bruce Mamando	SR	1 March	1997–98	Canberra Raiders	North Queensland Cowboys	18	6	0	0	24
18	Rod Maybon	FB	9 March	1997–98	Parramatta Eels	Canberra Raiders	18†	10	0	0	40
19	Andrew Pierce	PR/SR	9 March	1997–98	Cronulla Sharks	Cronulla Sharks	34	1	0	1	5
20	Dean Schifilliti	FE/HB/LK	9 March	1997–98	North Queensland Cowboys	Parramatta Eels	38†	7	0	0	28
21	Mark Corvo	PR	14 March	1997–98	Canberra Raiders	Canberra Raiders	38	1	0	0	4
22	Luke Williamson	CE/FE	21 March	1997–98		Canberra Raiders	32†	8	65	0	162
23	Alan Cann	PR/SR	27 March	1997–98	Brisbane Broncos		34	1	0	0	4
24	Danny Grimley	CE	19 April	1997–98	Parramatta Eels		21†	6	0	0	24
25	Jason Donnelly	WG	27 April	1997	St George Dragons		7	0	0	0	0
26	David Kidwell	CE	17 August	1997–98		Parramatta Eels	16	2	0	0	8
27	Adam Peek	PR/LK	22 August	1997–98		Canterbury Bulldogs	13	1	0	0	4
28	Peter Clarke	CE	13 March	1998	Sydney City Roosters	South Sydney Rabbitohs	16	2	0	0	8
29	Noel Goldthorpe	HB	13 March	1998	Hunter Mariners	North Queensland Cowboys	22	1	1	0	6
30	Tony Iro	SR	13 March	1998	Hunter Mariners	South Sydney Rabbitohs	20	1	0	0	4
31	Darrien Doherty	PR/SR	13 March	1998	Hunter Mariners	North Queensland Cowboys	19	0	0	0	0
32	Matt Daylight	WG	22 March	1998	Western Reds	Gateshead Thunder	20	7	0	0	28
33	Craig Kimmorley	HB	27 March	1998	Hunter Mariners	Sydney City Roosters	3	0	3	0	6
34	Meti Noovao	FE	17 April	1998	Auckland Warriors		1	0	0	0	0
35	Rod Jensen	WG	25 April	1998		Canberra Raiders	17	8	0	0	32
36	Graham Appo	FB/CE	8 May	1998	Canberra Raiders	Sydney City Roosters	14	12	34	0	116
37	Craig Bowen	FE	8 May	1998	Gold Coast Chargers	Wests Panthers	4	1	0	0	4
38	Deon Bird	FB/FE	23 May	1998	Paris Saint-Germain	Gateshead Thunder	14	0	6	0	24
39	Sam Faalafi	PR	6 June	1998			1	0	0	0	0
40	Alan Wieland	SR	27 June	1998			7	1	0	0	4
41	Jamie McDonald	PR	1 August	1998		North Queensland Cowboys	2	0	0	0	0

†Full team list not available for WCC matches against Oldham on 20 June 1997 or 25 July 1997, or against Leeds on 18 July 1997 or Salford on 3 August 1997 but this player scored in one or more of these matches and so is awarded an appearance for that match.
