= 1998 Adelaide Rams season =

Team information
- Coach: Rod Reddy; Dean Lance
- Captain: Kerrod Walters
- Stadium: Adelaide Oval; Hindmarsh Stadium
← 1997

The 1998 Adelaide Rams season was the Adelaide Rams' second and final season as a rugby league club. They competed in the first season of the National Rugby League.

The club was again coached by Rod Reddy and captained by Kerrod Walters. However, after the Rams lost nine of their first ten games, coach Reddy and the entire coaching staff were sacked by the Rams' administration. Reddy was replaced by former Perth Reds coach Dean Lance.

== Results ==
In June after numerous financial disagreements with the South Australian Cricket Association (SACA) who at the time owned the Adelaide Oval, the club changed home grounds to the smaller, 16,000 capacity Hindmarsh Stadium, a soccer specific venue which was better suited to a rugby league field than the Adelaide Oval was. The Rams celebrated the move with a record 52–0 win over the Balmain Tigers.

The club went on to win six of their last fourteen games after the arrival of Dean Lance's, enough to avoid the wooden spoon awarded to the team finishing lowest on the competition ladder. Their overall results were comparable to those of their first season, coming fourth last in the 20–team competition. Appo broke several team records in his 14 games with the Rams.

The Adelaide Rams last home game in the penultimate round of the season saw a 36–0 thrashing at the hands of the finals bound North Sydney Bears in front of 7,035 fans on 15 August 1998.

Throughout the 1998 season, the Rams attempted to build a stronger supporter base in order to avoid removal from the competition in 1999 or 2000. However, with the team's lack of on-field success, plus the success of other Adelaide-based sports teams who won national championships in 1997 and/or 1998 including the Adelaide Crows (AFL), Adelaide 36ers (NBL) and Adelaide Thunderbirds (netball), saw average home attendances dropped by more than half (51.3%) from the previous years 15,330 to just 7,472 over the course of the season.

Adelaide Rams 1998 NRL season results
Round	Home	Scoreline	Away	Date	Venue	Crowd
1	Adelaide Rams	8 – 18	North Queensland Cowboys	13 March	Adelaide Oval	11,289
2	Manly-Warringah Sea Eagles	22 – 6	Adelaide Rams	22 March	Brookvale Oval	6,434
3	Adelaide Rams	22 – 20	Canterbury Bulldogs	27 March	Adelaide Oval	8,390
4	Penrith Panthers	54 – 12	Adelaide Rams	5 April	Penrith Football Stadium	6,637
5	Adelaide Rams	8 – 16	Gold Coast Chargers	9 April	Adelaide Oval	7,058
6	Sydney City Roosters	50 – 12	Adelaide Rams	17 April	Sydney Football Stadium	6,200
7	Adelaide Rams	12 – 22	Cronulla-Sutherland Sharks	25 April	Adelaide Oval	8,472
8	Canterbury Bulldogs	30 – 4	Adelaide Rams	3 May	Belmore Sports Ground	5,041
9	Adelaide Rams	18 – 24	Canberra Raiders	8 May	Adelaide Oval	6,500
10	Parramatta Eels	18 – 2	Adelaide Rams	16 May	Pioneer Oval	7,514
11	Adelaide Rams	35 – 18	Penrith Panthers	23 May	Adelaide Oval	5,000
12	Western Suburbs Magpies	36 – 24	Adelaide Rams	31 May	Campbelltown Stadium	6,392
13	Adelaide Rams	22 – 20	St George Dragons	6 June	Adelaide Oval	8,506
14	Melbourne Storm	24 – 4	Adelaide Rams	13 June	Olympic Park	8,293
15	Adelaide Rams	4 – 39	Illawarra Steelers	20 June	Bennett Oval	5,153
16	Gold Coast Chargers	12 – 40	Adelaide Rams	27 June	Carrara Stadium	3,897
17	Adelaide Rams	52 – 0	Balmain Tigers	3 July	Hindmarsh Stadium	7,351
18	South Sydney Rabbitohs	18 – 34	Adelaide Rams	12 July	Sydney Football Stadium	4,060
19	North Queensland Cowboys	14 – 10	Adelaide Rams	18 July	Dairy Farmers Stadium	11,340
20	Adelaide Rams	22 – 20	Auckland Warriors	26 July	Hindmarsh Stadium	7,445
21	Brisbane Broncos	46 – 12	Adelaide Rams	1 August	ANZ Stadium	13,858
22	Adelaide Rams	10 – 32	Manly-Warringah Sea Eagles	7 August	Hindmarsh Stadium	7,459
23	Adelaide Rams	0 – 36	North Sydney Bears	15 August	Hindmarsh Stadium	7,035
24	Newcastle Knights	34 – 20	Adelaide Rams	22 August	Marathon Stadium	17,281

=== Ladder ===
1998 NRL season
Pos	Team	Pld	W	D	L	PF	PA	PD	Pts
1	Brisbane Broncos (P)	24	18	1	5	688	310	+378	37
2	Newcastle Knights	24	18	1	5	562	381	+181	37
3	Melbourne Storm	24	17	1	6	546	372	+174	35
4	Parramatta Eels	24	17	1	6	468	349	+119	35
5	North Sydney Bears	24	17	0	7	663	367	+296	34
6	Sydney City Roosters	24	16	0	8	680	383	+297	32
7	Canberra Raiders	24	15	0	9	564	429	+135	30
8	St. George Dragons	24	13	1	10	486	490	−4	27
9	Canterbury-Bankstown Bulldogs	24	13	0	11	489	411	+78	26
10	Manly Warringah Sea Eagles	24	13	0	11	503	473	+30	26
11	Cronulla-Sutherland Sharks	24	12	1	11	438	387	+51	25
12	Illawarra Steelers	24	11	1	12	476	539	−63	23
13	Balmain Tigers	24	9	1	14	381	463	−82	19
14	Penrith Panthers	24	8	2	14	525	580	−55	18
15	Auckland Warriors	24	9	0	15	417	518	−101	18
16	North Queensland Cowboys	24	9	0	15	361	556	−195	18
17	Adelaide Rams	24	7	0	17	393	615	−222	14
18	South Sydney Rabbitohs	24	5	0	19	339	560	−221	10
19	Gold Coast Chargers	24	4	0	20	289	654	−365	8
20	Western Suburbs Magpies	24	4	0	20	371	802	−431	8

(P) Premiers

=== Ladder progression ===
- Numbers highlighted in green indicate that the team finished the round inside the top 10.
- Numbers highlighted in blue indicates the team finished first on the ladder in that round.
- Numbers highlighted in red indicates the team finished in last place on the ladder in that round

	Team	1	2	3	4	5	6	7	8	9	10	11	12	13	14	15	16	17	18	19	20	21	22	23	24
1	Brisbane Broncos	2	4	6	8	10	10	12	14	14	14	16	16	16	18	20	22	24	26	28	29	31	33	35	37
2	Newcastle Knights	2	4	6	8	10	10	12	12	14	16	18	20	22	24	24	26	27	29	31	31	31	33	35	37
3	Melbourne Storm	2	4	6	8	8	10	12	14	14	16	17	19	21	23	25	25	25	27	27	29	31	33	33	35
4	Parramatta Eels	2	4	4	6	8	8	8	10	12	14	16	18	20	22	24	24	24	26	28	28	30	32	34	35
5	North Sydney Bears	0	2	4	4	6	8	8	10	12	12	14	14	16	18	18	20	22	22	24	26	28	30	32	34
6	Sydney City Roosters	2	2	2	4	6	8	10	12	14	16	16	16	18	20	20	22	24	24	26	26	26	28	30	32
7	Canberra Raiders	0	0	2	2	4	4	6	8	10	12	12	14	16	16	18	18	20	20	22	24	26	28	30	30
8	St George Dragons	2	2	2	4	6	8	10	12	14	16	18	20	20	22	22	22	22	24	24	26	26	26	26	27
9	Canterbury Bulldogs	2	2	2	2	2	4	6	8	10	10	10	12	12	12	14	14	16	18	18	18	20	22	24	26
10	Manly Warringah Sea Eagles	0	2	2	2	2	4	6	6	6	6	8	8	8	8	10	12	14	14	16	18	20	22	24	26
11	Cronulla-Sutherland Sharks	0	2	2	2	4	4	6	8	10	10	12	14	14	14	16	18	18	18	19	21	23	23	23	25
12	Illawarra Steelers	0	2	2	2	2	4	6	6	8	8	9	11	13	13	15	17	19	19	19	19	21	21	23	23
13	Balmain Tigers	2	2	4	6	8	10	10	10	10	10	12	12	12	14	16	16	16	18	18	19	19	19	19	19
14	Penrith Panthers	0	2	2	4	4	4	4	6	6	8	8	8	8	8	8	8	9	11	12	14	14	14	16	18
15	Auckland Warriors	0	0	2	2	4	4	4	4	4	6	8	8	10	10	12	14	14	14	16	16	18	18	18	18
16	North Queensland Cowboys	2	4	6	8	8	10	10	10	10	10	10	12	14	14	14	14	16	16	18	18	18	18	18	18
17	Adelaide Rams	0	0	2	2	2	2	2	2	2	2	4	4	6	6	6	8	10	12	12	14	14	14	14	14
18	South Sydney Rabbitohs	2	2	2	2	2	4	4	4	4	4	4	4	4	4	4	6	6	6	6	8	8	10	10	10
19	Gold Coast Chargers	0	0	0	0	2	2	2	2	4	4	4	4	4	6	6	6	6	8	8	8	8	8	8	8
20	Western Suburbs Magpies	0	0	2	2	2	2	2	2	2	4	4	6	6	8	8	8	8	8	8	8	8	8	8	8

== Players ==
The demise of three clubs from the Super League and ARL (Western Reds and Hunter Mariners (SL), and South Queensland Crushers (ARL)) saw some player re-shuffling, and brought Noel Goldthorpe, Tony Iro and Matt Daylight to the Adelaide club.

No.	Name	Pos.	Debut	App	T	G	FG	Pts
2	Wayne Simonds	WG	1 March 1997	10	2	0	0	8
5	Joe Tamani	WG	1 March 1997	7	2	0	0	8
8	Andrew Hick	PR	1 March 1997	21	3	0	0	12
9	Kerrod Walters	HK	1 March 1997	24	1	0	0	4
10	Marty McKenzie	PR	1 March 1997	14	1	0	0	4
11	Dave Boughton	SR	1 March 1997	3	0	0	0	0
12	Brett Galea	SR	1 March 1997	8	1	0	0	4
15	Chris Quinn	FB/CE/FE	1 March 1997	17	2	0	0	8
17	Bruce Mamando	SR	1 March 1997	2	1	0	0	4
18	Rod Maybon	FB	9 March 1997	2	1	0	0	4
19	Andrew Pierce	PR/SR	9 March 1997	21	0	0	1	1
20	Dean Schifilliti	FE/HB/LK	9 March 1997	21	6	0	0	24
21	Mark Corvo	PR	14 March 1997	20	1	0	0	4
22	Luke Williamson	CE/FE	21 March 1997	17	3	16	0	44
23	Alan Cann	PR/SR	27 March 1997	21	1	0	0	4
24	Danny Grimley	CE	19 April 1997	13	4	0	0	16
26	David Kidwell	CE	17 August 1997	14	2	0	0	8
27	Adam Peek	PR/LK	22 August 1997	12	1	0	0	4
28	Peter Clarke	CE	13 March 1998	16	2	0	0	8
29	Noel Goldthorpe	HB	13 March 1998	22	1	1	0	6
30	Tony Iro	SR	13 March 1998	20	1	0	0	4
31	Darrien Doherty	PR/SR	13 March 1998	19	0	0	0	0
32	Matthew Daylight	WG	22 March 1998	20	7	0	0	28
33	Craig Kimmorley	HB	27 March 1998	3	0	3	0	6
34	Meti Noovao	FE	17 April 1998	1	0	0	0	0
35	Rod Jensen	WG	25 April 1998	17	8	0	0	32
36	Graham Appo	FB/CE	8 May 1998	14	12	34	0	116
37	Craig Bowen	FE	8 May 1998	4	1	0	0	4
38	Deon Bird	FB/FE	23 May 1998	14	0	6	0	24
39	Sam Faalafi	PR	6 June 1998	1	0	0	0	0
40	Alan Wieland	SR	27 June 1998	7	1	0	0	4
41	Jamie McDonald	PR	1 August 1998	2	0	0	0	0
