= 1997 Adelaide Rams season =

Team information
- Coach: Rod Reddy
- Captain: Kerrod Walters
- Stadium: Adelaide Oval
1998 →

The 1997 Adelaide Rams season was the Adelaide Rams' debut season as a rugby league club. They competed in the Super League's Telstra Cup and World Club Championship.

The club had appointed St. George Dragons international back rower Rod Reddy to be their inaugural coach, along with two-time NSWRL premiership-winning Hooker Kerrod Walters from the Brisbane Broncos to be the first captain of the team. Most of the junior players were drawn from the SARL's lower grade competitions in the region.

== First match ==
The club played its first premiership match against the North Queensland Cowboys on 1 March 1997 and, after leading 16–4 at half time, eventually lost 24–16.

This game was the first to be played of the new Super League competition.

Saturday, 1 March 1997

North Queensland Cowboys	24 – 16	Adelaide Rams
Tries: Steve Walters (2); Luke Phillips; Tyran Smith; Goals: Luke Phillips (4/5)		Tries: Brett Galea; Kerrod Walters Goals: Kurt Wrigley (4/4)

Stockland Stadium, Townsville
Attendance: 17,738
Referee: Brian Grant (Australia)

North Queensland	Adelaide Rams

FB	22	Scott Mahon
RW	28	Luke Phillips
RC	30	Ben Tabuai
LC	1	Kyle Warren
LW	34	Ray Mercy
FE	6	Andrew Dunemann
HB	7	Jason Ferris
PR	8	John Lomax
HK	49	Steve Walters
PR	10	Martin Locke
SR	11	Tyran Smith
SR	31	Ian Roberts (c)
LK	13	Owen Cunningham
Substitutions:
IC	9	Jason Death
IC	21	Peter Jones
IC	16	Ian Dunemann
IC	17	Dion Cope
Coach:
(Australia) Tim Sheens

FB	3	Michael Maguire
RW	22	Wayne Simonds
RC	25	Solomon Kiri
LC	–	Elias Paiyo
LW	44	Joe Tamani
FE	33	Kurt Wrigley
HB	7	Stuart Topper
PR	11	Andrew Hick
HK	27	Kerrod Walters (c)
PR	–	Marty McKenzie
SR	13	Dave Boughton
SR	12	Brett Galea
LF	10	Cameron Blair
Substitutions:
IC	36	Kevin Campion
IC	6	Chris Quinn
IC	9	Steve Stone
IC	–	Bruce Mamando
Coach:
(Australia) Rod Reddy

== Results ==
Their first home match, against the Hunter Mariners, was also the Rams' first win, and drew their record home attendance of 27,435 to the Adelaide Oval, one of only two home wins for the season. The Rams also won four away games with their first being in Round 4 against the Auckland Warriors at the Ericsson Stadium in Auckland, New Zealand, but their overall record of 6 wins, 11 losses and 1 draw placed them second last on the Super League premiership ladder, one win ahead of North Queensland.

The Rams first home game attendance of 27,435 was the 4th highest attendance of the entire 1997 season, behind only the Grand Final at the ANZ Stadium in Brisbane (58,912), the opening game of the season in Brisbane (42,361) and a Round 6 match at the Stockland Stadium in Townsville (30,122). The Rams average home attendance of 15,330 was also the 4th best in the league behind Brisbane (19,298), North Queensland (17,539) and Auckland (15,442).

Adelaide Rams 1997 Super League season results
Round	Home	Scoreline	Away	Date	Venue	Crowd
1	North Queensland Cowboys	24 - 16	Adelaide Rams	1 March	Dairy Farmers Stadium	17,738
2	Brisbane Broncos	28 - 12	Adelaide Rams	9 March	ANZ Stadium	16,279
3	Adelaide Rams	10 - 8	Hunter Mariners	14 March	Adelaide Oval	27,435
4	Auckland Warriors	12 - 16	Adelaide Rams	21 March	Ericsson Stadium	13,000
5	Adelaide Rams	16 - 18	Perth Reds	27 March	Adelaide Oval	16,294
6	Canterbury Bulldogs	34 - 22	Adelaide Rams	6 April	Belmore Sports Ground	7,234
7	Adelaide Rams	10 - 20	Brisbane Broncos	13 April	Adelaide Oval	17,633
8	Cronulla Sharks	18 - 29	Adelaide Rams	19 April	Shark Park	10,112
9	Penrith Panthers	16 - 22	Adelaide Rams	27 April	Penrith Football Stadium	5,815
10	Adelaide Rams	14 - 14	North Queensland Cowboys	2 May	Adelaide Oval	15,970
11	Adelaide Rams	22 - 42	Canterbury Bulldogs	23 May	Adelaide Oval	15,022
12	Adelaide Rams	18 - 34	Canberra Raiders	1 June	Adelaide Oval	13,894
13	Perth Reds	4 - 28	Adelaide Rams	29 June	W.A.C.A	7,204
14	Hunter Mariners	10 - 2	Adelaide Rams	5 July	Topper Stadium	2,345
15	Adelaide Rams	8 - 18	Auckland Warriors	11 July	Adelaide Oval	13,278
16	Adelaide Rams	6 - 28	Cronulla Sharks	8 August	Adelaide Oval	7,231
17	Canberra Raiders	58 - 16	Adelaide Rams	17 August	Canberra Stadium	7,960
18	Adelaide Rams	36 - 16	Penrith Panthers	22 August	Adelaide Oval	11,211

=== Telstra Cup ===
Pos	Team	Pld	W	D	L	PF	PA	PD	Pts
1	Brisbane Broncos (P)	18	14	1	3	481	283	+198	29
2	Cronulla Sharks	18	12	0	6	403	230	+173	24
3	Canberra Raiders	18	11	0	7	436	337	+99	22
4	Canterbury Bulldogs	18	10	0	8	453	447	+6	20
5	Penrith Panthers	18	9	0	9	431	462	-31	18
6	Hunter Mariners	18	7	0	11	350	363	-13	14
7	Auckland Warriors	18	7	0	11	332	406	-74	14
8	Perth Reds	18	7	0	11	321	456	-135	14
9	Adelaide Rams	18	6	1	11	303	402	-99	13
10	North Queensland Cowboys	18	5	2	11	328	452	-124	12

- (P) - Premiers

=== Ladder progression ===
- Numbers highlighted in green indicate that the team finished the round inside the top 5.
- Numbers highlighted in blue indicates the team finished first on the ladder in that round.
- Numbers highlighted in red indicates the team finished in last place on the ladder in that round

	Team	1	2	3	4	5	6	7	8	9	10	11	12	13	14	15	16	17	18
1	Brisbane	2	4	6	8	10	12	14	14	16	18	19	19	19	21	23	25	27	29
2	Cronulla	2	4	6	6	6	8	8	8	10	10	12	14	16	16	18	20	22	24
3	Canberra	0	0	0	0	2	2	4	6	8	10	12	14	14	16	16	18	20	22
4	Canterbury	2	2	4	4	4	6	8	10	10	12	14	14	16	16	18	20	20	20
5	Penrith	2	4	6	8	8	10	10	12	12	12	12	14	16	16	16	16	18	18
6	Hunter	0	0	0	2	2	2	4	6	6	6	8	10	12	14	14	14	14	14
7	Auckland	0	2	2	2	4	6	6	6	6	6	6	6	6	8	10	10	12	14
8	Perth	0	2	2	4	6	6	8	8	8	10	10	12	12	12	12	14	14	14
9	Adelaide	0	0	2	4	4	4	4	6	8	9	9	9	11	11	11	11	11	13
10	North Queensland	2	2	2	2	4	4	4	4	6	7	8	8	8	10	12	12	12	12

=== World Club Championship ===
The Rams were placed in Australasia Pool B along with the Hunter Mariners, North Queensland Cowboys and Perth Reds and would be matched up against teams from Europe Pool B including the Leeds Rhinos, Oldham Bears and Salford City Reds. The competition would see the Rams play three games at home and three in England.

The Rams won their three home games rather easily, but only managed to win one of their games in England leaving them in third place in their pool. As only one team from Australasia Pool B would go on to the Quarter finals, this meant that the Adelaide Rams did not advance past the group stage of the tournament.

Adelaide Rams 1997 World Club Championship results
Round	Home	Scoreline	Away	Date	Venue	Crowd
1	Adelaide Rams	50 - 16	Salford City Reds	8 June	Adelaide Oval	11,009
2	Adelaide Rams	34 - 8	Leeds Rhinos	13 June	Adelaide Oval	14,360
3	Adelaide Rams	42 - 14	Oldham Bears	20 June	Adelaide Oval	13,852
4	Leeds Rhinos	22 - 14	Adelaide Rams	18 July	Headingley	11,269
5	Oldham Bears	2 - 18	Adelaide Rams	25 July	Boundary Park	3,513
6	Salford City Reds	14 - 12	Adelaide Rams	6 April	The Willows	6,995

==== Pool B ====
Club	Played	Won	Lost	Drawn	For	Against	Diff.	Points
Hunter Mariners	6	6	0	0	226	50	176	12
North Queensland Cowboys	6	5	1	0	228	92	136	10
Adelaide Rams	6	4	2	0	170	68	102	8
Perth Reds	6	4	2	0	148	104	44	8

== Players ==
Excluding World Club Challenge matches, Goal kicking utility back Kurt Wrigley was the Rams top point scorer for the season with 81 points from 5 tries, 30 goals and 1 field goal. Wrigley and fullback Rod Maybon were the team's top try scorers with 5 each.

Under Super League's rules, players were free to choose their own numbers which they would use throughout the season rather than wearing the traditional 1 through 13.

Player No.	Name	Pos.	Debut	App	T	G	FG	Pts
3	Michael Maguire	Fullback, Wing	1 March 1997	7	1	0	0	4
22	Wayne Simonds	Wing	1 March 1997	15†	6	0	0	24
25	Solomon Kiri	Centre	1 March 1997	13†	5	0	0	20
–	Elias Paiyo	Centre	1 March 1997	6	0	0	0	0
44	Joe Tamani	Wing	1 March 1997	15	4	0	0	16
33	Kurt Wrigley	Five-eighth, Centre	1 March 1997	18†	6	36	1	97
–	Stuart Topper	Halfback	1 March 1997	6	1	0	0	4
11	Andrew Hick	Prop, Second-row	1 March 1997	17†	1	0	0	4
49	Kerrod Walters (c)	Hooker	1 March 1997	19	4	0	0	16
–	Marty McKenzie	Prop	1 March 1997	5	1	0	0	4
13	Dave Boughton	Second-row, Lock	1 March 1997	16	1	0	0	4
12	Brett Galea	Second-row	1 March 1997	14†	3	0	0	12
10	Cameron Blair	Second-row, Lock	1 March 1997	18	4	0	0	16
36	Kevin Campion	Prop, Second-row, Lock	1 March 1997	15	1	0	0	4
6	Chris Quinn	Centre, Fullback	1 March 1997	19†	4	0	0	16
9	Steve Stone	Halfback, Hooker	1 March 1997	17†	8	0	0	32
–	Bruce Mamando	Prop, Second-row	1 March 1997	16	5	0	0	20
1	Rod Maybon	Fullback	9 March 1997	16†	9	0	0	36
50	Andrew Pierce	Second-row, Lock	9 March 1997	13	1	0	0	4
21	Dean Schifilliti	Hooker, Five-eighth, Halfback	9 March 1997	17†	1	0	0	4
30	Mark Corvo	Prop	14 March 1997	18	0	0	0	0
51	Luke Williamson	Centre, Five-eighth	21 March 1997	15†	5	49	0	118
8	Alan Cann	Prop	27 March 1997	13	0	0	0	0
29	Danny Grimley	Centre	19 April 1997	8†	2	0	0	8
5	Jason Donnelly	Wing	27 April 1997	7	0	0	0	0
52	David Kidwell	Centre	17 August 1997	2	0	0	0	0
53	Adam Peek	Prop	22 August 1997	1	0	0	0	0

†Full team list not available for WCC matches against Oldham on 20 June 1997 or 25 July 1997, or against Leeds on 18 July 1997 or Salford on 3 August 1997 but this player scored in one or more of these matches and so is awarded an appearance for that match.
