= 1995 Rugby League World Cup Group B =

1995 Rugby League World Cup Group B was one of the three groups in the 1995 Rugby League World Cup. The group consisted of New Zealand, Papua New Guinea and Tonga.

== Ladder ==
Team	Pld	W	D	L	PF	PA	PD	Pts	Qualification
New Zealand	2	2	0	0	47	30	+17	4	Advanced to knockout stage
Tonga	2	0	1	1	52	53	−1	1	
Papua New Guinea	2	0	1	1	34	50	−16	1	

== New Zealand vs Tonga ==
Tonga looked to be pulling off the shock of the 1995 World Cup when they came from 12–6 down to lead New Zealand 24–12 with 20 minutes to go in the game at Wilderspool Stadium. However, late tries to Hitro Okesene and Richie Blackmore (his second), both converted by Matthew Ridge who also landed a field goal in the dying moments, saved the Kiwis from an embarrassing loss.

8 October 1995

New Zealand	25 – 24	Tonga
Tries: Richie Blackmore (2); Sean Hoppe; Tony Kemp; Hitro Okesene; Goals: Matthew Ridge (2/5); Field Goals: Matthew Ridge (1)		Tries: Willie Wolfgramm; Una Taufa; Jimmy Veikoso; Salesi Finau; Goals: Asa Amone (4/5)

Wilderspool Stadium, Warrington
Attendance: 8,083
Referee: David Campbell (England)

New Zealand	Tonga

FB	1	Matthew Ridge (c)
RW	2	Sean Hoppe
RC	3	Richie Blackmore
LC	4	Ruben Wiki
LW	5	Richie Barnett
FE	6	Gene Ngamu
HB	7	Stacey Jones
PR	8	Quentin Pongia
HK	9	Syd Eru
PR	10	Jason Lowrie
SR	11	Tony Iro
SR	12	Stephen Kearney
LF	13	Tony Kemp
Substitutions:
IC	14	Henry Paul
IC	15	Hitro Okesene
IC	16	Kevin Iro
IC	17	Mark Horo
Coach:
(New Zealand) Frank Endacott

FB	1	Asa Amone
RW	2	Una Taufa
RC	3	Tevita Vaikona
LC	4	Phil Howlett
LW	5	Jimmy Veikoso
FE	6	Angelo Dymock
HB	7	Willie Wolfgramm
PR	8	Martin Masella
HK	9	Duane Mann (c)
PR	10	Liuaki Hansen
SR	11	George Mann
SR	12	Solomon Haumono
LK	13	Awen Guttenbeil
Substitutions:
IC	14	Salesi Finau
IC	15	Talite Liava'a
IC	16	Luke Leilua
IC	17	Taukolo Tonga
Coach:
(New Zealand) Mike McClennan

== Papua New Guinea vs Tonga ==
Tonga continued their good form to lead Papua New Guinea 20–0 at half time. However, the Kumuls came alive in the second half to pull out a 28–all draw.

10 October 1995

Papua New Guinea	28 – 28	Tonga
Tries: Adrian Lam; Elias Paiyo; David Buko; Stanley Gene; Lucas Solbat; Goals: Elias Paiyo (4)		Tries: Awen Guttenbeil (2); Phil Howlett; Willie Wolfgramm; Tauʻalupe Liku; Una Taufa; Goals: Asa Amone (2)

The Boulevard, Kingston upon Hull
Attendance: 5,121
Referee: Claude Alba (France)

Papua New Guinea	Tonga

FB	1	David Buko
RW	2	James Kops
RC	3	David Gomia
LC	4	John Okul
LW	5	Joshua Kouoru
FE	6	Stanley Gene
HB	7	Adrian Lam (c)
PR	8	Tuiyo Evei
HK	9	Elias Paiyo
PR	10	David Westley
SR	11	Max Tiri
SR	12	Nande Yer
LK	13	Bruce Mamando
Substitutions:
IC	14	Robert Tela
IC	15	Lucas Solbat
IC	16	Marcus Bai
IC	17	David Reeka
Coach:
(Papua New Guinea) Joe Tokam

FB	1	Asa Amone
RW	2	Una Taufa
RC	3	Tevita Vaikona
LC	4	Talite Liava'a
LW	5	Jimmy Veikoso
FE	6	Phil Howlett
HB	7	Willie Wolfgramm
PR	8	Martin Masella
HK	9	Duane Mann (c)
PR	10	Liuaki Hansen
SR	11	George Mann
SR	12	Solomon Haumono
LK	13	Awen Guttenbeil
Substitutions:
IC	14	Salesi Finau
IC	15	Tauʻalupe Liku
IC	16	Taukolo Tonga
IC	17
Coach:
(New Zealand) Mike McClennan

== New Zealand vs Papua New Guinea ==
New Zealand finally showed some good form with a 22–6 win over a game Papua New Guinea at Knowsley Road. The Kiwis lost first choice hooker Syd Eru before the game after he failed a drug test. The New Zealand team doctor confirmed the banned substance was part of an over the counter cough medicine Eru had taken for a cold, but the ban stood and he was out for the rest of the tournament. He was replaced at hooker by Gary Freeman playing his 45th and last test for New Zealand.

13 October 1995

New Zealand	22 – 6	Papua New Guinea
Tries: Matthew Ridge; Richie Blackmore; Sean Hoppe; Goals: Matthew Ridge (4); Gene Ngamu (1)		Tries: Marcus Bai Goals: Elias Paiyo (1/2)

Knowsley Road, St Helens
Attendance: 8,679
Referee: Stuart Cummings (England)

New Zealand	Papua New Guinea

FB	1	Matthew Ridge (c)
RW	2	Sean Hoppe
RC	3	Richie Blackmore
LC	4	Ruben Wiki
LW	5	Jason Williams
FE	6	Henry Paul
HB	7	Stacey Jones
PR	8	Quentin Pongia
HK	9	Gary Freeman
PR	10	Jason Lowrie
SR	11	Stephen Kearney
SR	12	Mark Horo
LF	13	Tony Kemp
Substitutions:
IC	14	Gene Ngamu
IC	15	Hitro Okesene
IC	16	Kevin Iro
IC	17	Tony Iro
Coach:
(New Zealand) Frank Endacott

FB	1	David Buko
RW	2	James Kops
RC	3	David Gomia
LC	4	John Okul
LW	5	Joshua Kouoru
FE	6	Stanley Gene
HB	7	Adrian Lam (c)
PR	8	Nande Yer
HK	9	Elias Paiyo
PR	10	David Westley
SR	11	Max Tiri
SR	12	Michael Angara
LK	13	Bruce Mamando
Substitutions:
IC	14	Lucas Solbat
IC	15	Marcus Bai
IC	16	Ben Biri
IC	17
Coach:
(Papua New Guinea) Joe Tokam
