= Kimmorley =

Kimmorley is a surname. Notable people with the surname include:

- Brett Kimmorley (born 1976), Australian rugby league coach and former player
- Col Kimmorley (born 1956), former Australian rules footballer
- Craig Kimmorley (born 1974), Australian former rugby league footballer
