= List of Papua New Guinea national rugby league team coaches =

The following men have coached the Papua New Guinea national rugby league team in international test competition.

== List of coaches ==
Name	Debut	Final Match	Games	Won	Draws	Lost	Tours	World Cups
(Australia) Barry van Heekeren	1968	1973	3	0	0	3		
Val Murphy	1975	1975	1	0	0	1		
Duncan Yates	1977	1977	1	1	0	0		
(Papua New Guinea) Uve Sabumei	1979	1983	5	0	1	4		
(Papua New Guinea) Skerry Palanga	1982	1991	11	1	0	10		1985, 1989
(Australia) Barry Wilson	1986	1987	4	1	0	3		
(Papua New Guinea) John Wagambie	1992	1992	2	0	0	2		
(Papua New Guinea) Joe Tokam	1995	1995	2	0	1	1		1995
(Australia) Bob Bennett	2000	2005	3	1	0	2		2000
(Papua New Guinea) Adrian Lam	2006	2009	12	5	0	7		2008
(Papua New Guinea) Stanley Gene	2010	2010	5	0	0	5		
(Papua New Guinea) Adrian Lam	2011	2013	3	0	0	3		2013
(Australia) Mal Meninga	2014	2015	2	0	0	2		
(Papua New Guinea) Michael Marum	2016	2019	10	7	3	0		2017
(Papua New Guinea) Stanley Tepend	2022	2022	5	3	0	2		2021
(Australia) Justin Holbrook	2023	2023	3	2	0	1		
(Australia) Jason Demetriou	2024	present						

== See also ==
- List of current NRL coaches
- List of current NRL Women's coaches
