= 1997 Perth Reds season =

Team information
- Coach: Dean Lance
- Stadium: WACA Ground
← 1996

The Perth Reds 1997 season was the Perth Reds third and final first-grade season. The club competed in Australasia's Super League before being shut down at the end of the season.

== Ladder ==
	Team	Pld	W	D	L	PF	PA	PD	Pts
1	Brisbane	18	14	1	3	481	283	+198	29
2	Cronulla	18	12	0	6	403	230	+173	24
3	Canberra	18	11	0	7	436	337	+99	22
4	Canterbury	18	10	0	8	453	447	+6	20
5	Penrith	18	9	0	9	431	462	-31	18
6	Hunter	18	7	0	11	350	363	-13	14
7	Auckland	18	7	0	11	332	406	-74	14
8	Perth	18	7	0	11	321	456	-135	14
9	Adelaide	18	6	1	11	303	402	-99	13
10	North Queensland	18	5	2	11	328	452	-124	12

=== WCC Australasia Pool B ===
Club	Played	Won	Lost	Drawn	For	Against	Diff.	Points
Hunter Mariners	6	6	0	0	226	50	176	12
North Queensland Cowboys	6	5	1	0	228	92	136	10
Adelaide Rams	6	4	2	0	170	68	102	8
Perth Reds	6	4	2	0	148	104	44	8
