= Marty McKenzie =

Marty McKenzie may refer to:

- Marty McKenzie (rugby league), Australian rugby league player
- Marty McKenzie (rugby union), Rugby union footballer
