= Chris Blair =

Chris Blair may refer to:

- Chris Blair (badminton) (born 1978), New Zealand badminton player
- Chris Blair (sportscaster), American radio sportscaster
- Chris Blair (rugby league) (born 1964), Australian rugby league footballer
- Chris Blair (American football) (born 1997), wide receiver
