= Bianca Reddy =

Australian netball player

Personal information
- Born: 21 December 1982 (age 43) Sydney, New South Wales, Australia
- Height: 185 cm (6 ft 1 in)
- Relatives: Liam Reddy, Joel Reddy (brothers); Rod Reddy (father)

Netball career
- Playing positions: GK, GD, WD
Years	Club team	Apps
2010	West Coast Fever	
2001, 2005–2009	Adelaide Thunderbirds	
- Updated on 2009-03-28

Bianca Reddy (born 21 December 1982) is an Australian former netball player who played for the Adelaide Thunderbirds. In 2010, Reddy did not play in the ANZ Championship, but played for the West Coast Fever replacing the injured Josie Janz.

== Biography ==
Her brothers are Perth Glory goalkeeper Liam Reddy, former rugby league back Joel Reddy, as well as her younger brother Kurt. She is the daughter of Australian Rugby League international and St George Dragons forward Rod Reddy.

Reddy previously worked at Blackwood High School as a netball teacher for the special interest netball program. After this, she worked as a science teacher at Mitcham Girls High School. Currently, she teaches Physical Education at Woodville High School.
