= Elias Paiyo =

PNG international rugby league footballer

Personal information
- Full name: Elias Fordly Paiyo
- Born: 22 September 1972 (age 54) Mt Hagen, Papua New Guinea

Playing information
- Height: 161 cm (5 ft 3 in)
- Weight: 83 kg (183 lb; 13 st 1 lb)
- Position: Hooker, Halfback, Centre
Club
| Years | Team | Pld | T | G | FG | P |
|---|---|---|---|---|---|---|
| 1992–95 | Port Moresby Vipers |
| 1997 | Adelaide Rams | 6 | 0 | 0 | 0 | 0 |
| | Total | 6 | 0 | 0 | 0 | 0 |
Representative
| Years | Team | Pld | T | G | FG | P |
| 1995–00 | Papua New Guinea | 9 | 3 | 8 | 0 | 28 |
- Source: RLP

Elias Paiyo is a Papua New Guinean professional rugby league player who represented Papua New Guinea in the 1995 and 2000 Rugby League World Cups.

== Early life ==
Paiyo was born in Mt Hagen as the second youngest child and only son in a family of five sisters. The family moved from Mt Hagen to Wabag, where the family originated from and where Paiyo's football career began.

== Playing career ==
Paiyo began playing for local Wabag rugby league team, Tarakum, at the age of 14. He was quickly selected for the Enga Mioks representative team at the age of 15 after a single season of playing rugby league. He was chosen for the Highlands Zone that same year but was ruled out of representative selection for being too young. The Maganis in Port Moresby invited him to play for them. Paiyo went on to play for Tarangau as the five-eight from 1991 to 1995 while he was training to become a Prison Officer with PNG Correctional Services in Port Moresby.

During that period he became a regular starter in the Port Moresby Vipers as the half/hooker in the SP Intercity Cup competition. He featured in the Vipers 1992 Premiership win and in 1993 the team finished as Runners-Up. Paiyo completed the match after suffering severe concussion mid-way through the first half.

In 1993 he was selected to represent PNG in a game against the Fiji Batis in Port Moresby. Paiyo was the Vice-Captain. PNG won 35-24.

Paiyo was named in the two-match test series against New Zealand in 1994 but was unable to take part as he was on a six-month national emergency deployment with 15 of his fellow Correctional Services officers and other police and defence force personnel, due to the eruption of two volcanos on the island of Rabaul.

After completing his deployment, Paiyo returned to the Port Moresby Vipers. After another sensational season, Paiyo was named in the 1995 World Cup side and at a dinner for the World Cup squad, Paiyo was awarded the Sir James Jacob National Player of the Year medal.

Elias Paiyo's first Rugby League International Federation sanctioned PNG representative game was on 10 October 1995 against Tonga in Hull. The team included Bruce Mamando, David Westley, Marcus Bai, John Okul and Stanley Gene. Elias Paiyo (PNG Kumul Representative Player No.171) set a record number of points by a PNG player in World Cup match during that game. That record stood for 22 years until it was broken by Rhyse Martin in 2017 in a World Cup match against Wales played in Port Moresby.

After solid World Cup performances, Paiyo and fellow Kumul, Bruce Mamando was signed to the inaugural Adelaide Rams team, a new club in the Australian Super League competition. Due to legal action in the ARL/Super League war, Paiyo and Mamando were sent to Canberra Raiders.

In 1996, Elias Paiyo captained the PNG team in the Super League World Nines held at Suva in Fiji. PNG finished Runners-Up in a finals match that was 10 all at full-time. New Zealand winning the match in extra time with a 24-10 victory. The three professional players, Bruce Mamando, David Westley and Paiyo, excluded themselves from receiving any of the $15,000 in prize money, choosing to share it amongst the rest of the team.

When Paiyo finally fronted in 1997, after the Super League/ARL war, for the Adelaide Rams team he found that the Club had signed three experienced Hooker/Halves including Kerrod Walters, Steve Stone and Dean Schifilliti.

He was not selected for the Kumuls in 2001 due to a selection policy excluding players from the New South Wales competition. In 2003 and 2004 Paiyo played for the Sydney Bulls in the Jim Beam Cup.

He retired from playing competitive Rugby League in 2007 and now resides in the Gold Coast of Australia.

== Coaching career ==
Elias Paiyo has been the Head Coach and Committee Member, of QLD PNG Rugby League since 2013. He heads a coaching team consisting of five Senior Coaches, Team Managers and trainers. As a committee member, he plays a role in the hosting of the annual Kokomo Nines Rugby League carnival, which hosts PNG teams from NSW, WA, QLD and PNG.

== Personal life ==
Elias married his wife, Karen, on 1 November 1998 in Sydney, and had a traditional Papua New-Guinean wedding in his village on 9 January 2000. He has two sons, Joshua and Jordan. Both boys have represented PNG in rugby league matches against NSW Country in 2018 and Gold Coast Titans in 2019. Joshua was named U16s Best and Fairest in the Queensland Pacific Island Cultural Carnival (QPICC) Rugby League Carnival in Brisbane. He was part of the U16s Championship winning QLD PNG Kokomos side in 2017. Elias moved from Sydney in 2005 and now lives on the Gold Coast.
