= Alex Corvo =

Australian rugby league footballer

Personal information
- Full name: Alexander Corvo
- Born: Canberra, Australian Capital Territory, Australia

Playing information
- Position: Prop
Club
Years	Team	Pld	T	G	FG	P
1991	Canberra Raiders	5	0	0	0	0
- Source: As of 25 January 2019
- Relatives: Mark Corvo (brother)

Alex Corvo is an Australian rugby league trainer and former player who played in the 1990s. He played professionally for the Canberra Raiders before working as a trainer for the Melbourne Storm, Brisbane Broncos and New Zealand Warriors.

His brother, Mark Corvo, also played for the Canberra Raiders.

== Playing career ==
Corvo played five first grade games for the Canberra Raiders during the 1991 NSWRL season.

== Trainer career ==
Corvo worked as the Salford City Reds' fitness trainer in 2001.

Corvo was the Melbourne Storm's head of performance between 2002 until 2013. He worked with the Australia Kangaroos between 2009 and 2015.

Corvo joined the Brisbane Broncos in 2014 as their head of strength and conditioning. He joined the Queensland Maroons for the 2016 and 2017 State of Origin series'.

He joined the New Zealand Warriors as strength and conditioning coach for three years, beginning with the 2018 season.
