= Paul Clarke (rugby league) =

Australian rugby league footballer

Personal information
- Full name: Paul Clarke
- Born: 25 January 1964 (age 62) Sydney, New South Wales, Australia

Playing information
- Position: Prop
Club
Years	Team	Pld	T	G	FG	P
1984–89	Balmain Tigers	64	1	0	0	4
1990–93	Penrith Panthers	86	2	0	0	8
1994–95	Parramatta Eels	36	3	0	0	12
	Total	186	6	0	0	24
Representative
Years	Team	Pld	T	G	FG	P
1991–92	NSW City	2	0	0	0	0
- Source: As of 9 April 2019
- Relatives: Peter Clarke (brother)

Paul Clarke nicknamed "Nobby" is an Australian former professional rugby league footballer who played in the 1980s and 1990s. He played for the Penrith Panthers, Balmain and the Parramatta Eels in the New South Wales Rugby League (NSWRL) competition. Clarke is the brother of former rugby league players Peter Clarke and Craig Clarke.

== Playing career ==
Clarke made his first grade debut for Balmain in Round 16 1984 against Manly-Warringah at Brookvale Oval. In 1985, Balmain finished second on the table but were eliminated in consecutive weeks during the finals series. Clarke played a total of 24 games for Balmain in 1985.

Balmain would go on to be a constant feature in the finals series over the coming years. Clarke missed both the 1988 and 1989 grand final defeats through injury. In 1990, Clarke joined Penrith and was a member of their first ever grand final side. Penrith would lose to Canberra 18–14.

In 1991, Penrith would reach their second grand final in a rematch against Canberra. Clarke played at prop as Penrith came from behind to win their first premiership 19–12 at the Sydney Football Stadium. After winning the 1991 premiership, Penrith's fortunes declined and the club failed to reach the finals in the following seasons.

In 1994, Clarke signed with the Parramatta Eels. Clarke played two seasons for Parramatta as the club struggled towards the bottom of the ladder narrowly avoiding the wooden spoon in 1995. Clarke retired following the conclusion of the 1995 season.
