= Luke Williamson =

Australian rugby league footballer (born 1978)

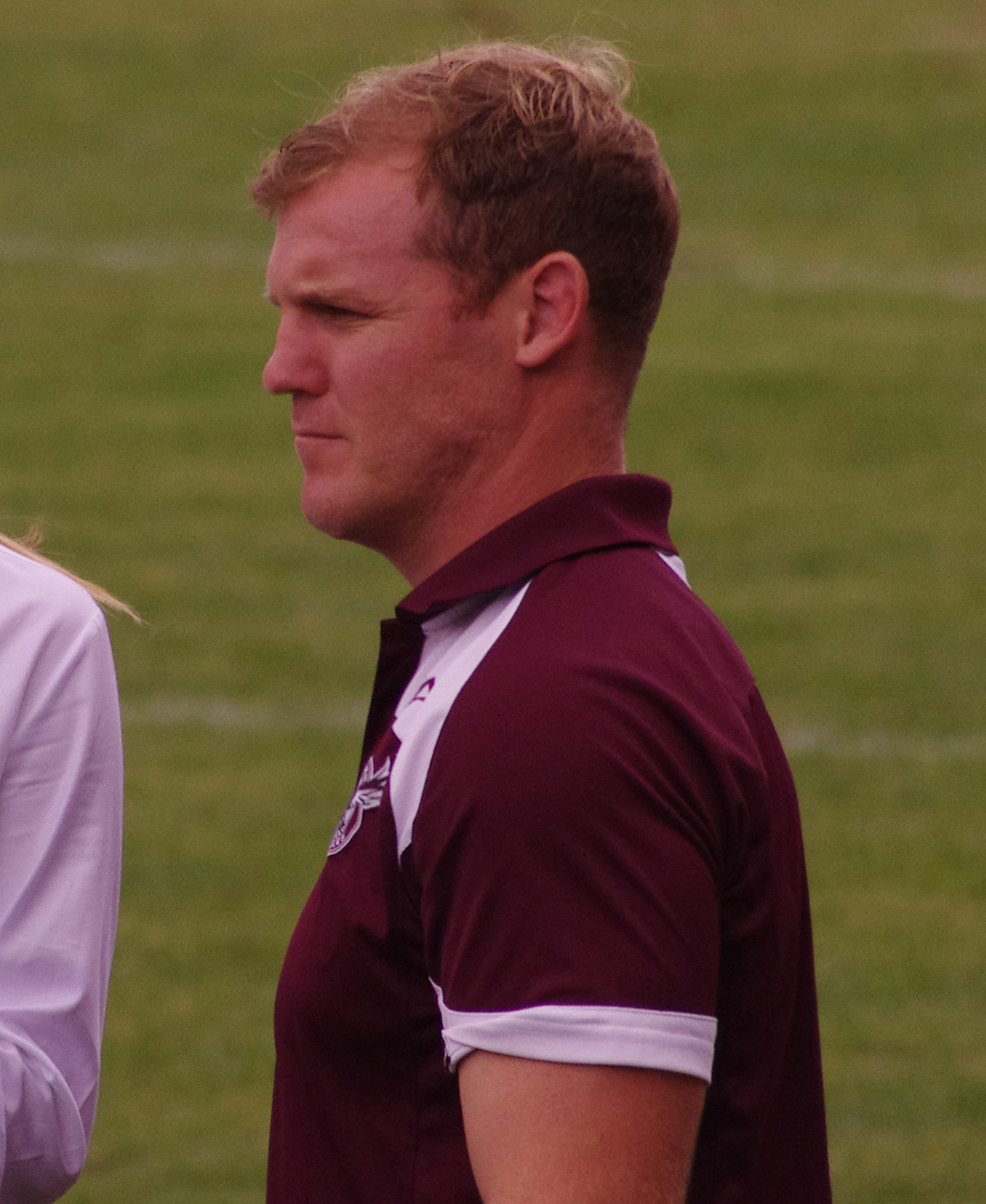

Personal information
- Born: 2 June 1978 (age 48) Strathpine, Queensland, Australia

Playing information
- Height: 184 cm (6 ft 0 in)
- Weight: 96 kg (15 st 2 lb)
- Position: Second-row, Lock, Centre, Five-eighth
Club
Years	Team	Pld	T	G	FG	P
1997–98	Adelaide Rams	29	6	45	0	114
1999–01	Canberra Raiders	41	8	113	3	261
2002	Northern Eagles	16	2	45	0	98
2003–08	Manly Sea Eagles	132	14	40	0	136
2009–10	Harlequins RL	42	6	0	0	24
	Total	260	36	243	3	633
- Relatives: Lionel Williamson (uncle)

Luke Williamson (born 2 June 1978) is an Australian former professional rugby league footballer who played in the 1990s and 2000s. He is now coach of the Manly Warringah Sea Eagles' NSW Cup team after previously coaching the team in 2011 and being the coach of Manly Warringah Sea Eagles Toyota Cup (Under-20s) team in the 2012 competition. His playing career was spent with the Adelaide Rams, the Canberra Raiders, the Northern Eagles and the Manly Warringah Sea Eagles in the National Rugby League and for the Harlequins RL in the Super League.

== Background ==
Williamson was born in Strathpine, Queensland, Australia. Williamson played for the South Queensland Crushers under 17's team through a scholarship program. Williamson then signed a contract with the Adelaide Rams after being offered the same money.

Williamson spoke with NRL.com in 2020 saying "I was on a scholarship with South Queensland and they offered me a contract right in the middle of Super League war. The Crushers offered me a contract worth exactly the same amount – $10,000 for the year – as Super League did when I was in South Queensland's under 17s.

"Dad just said, 'go to Adelaide', I left home as soon as I finished high school and a couple of months later I was down there by myself not knowing anyone. It was certainly a life lesson living off $300 a week in a city I'd never really even considered. I went down after school in late '95 and in '96 Super League was brushed in the courts. I came back to Brisbane and played there for six months, but I was still signed and went back down when it was back up and ready to go".

== Career ==
=== Adelaide Rams ===
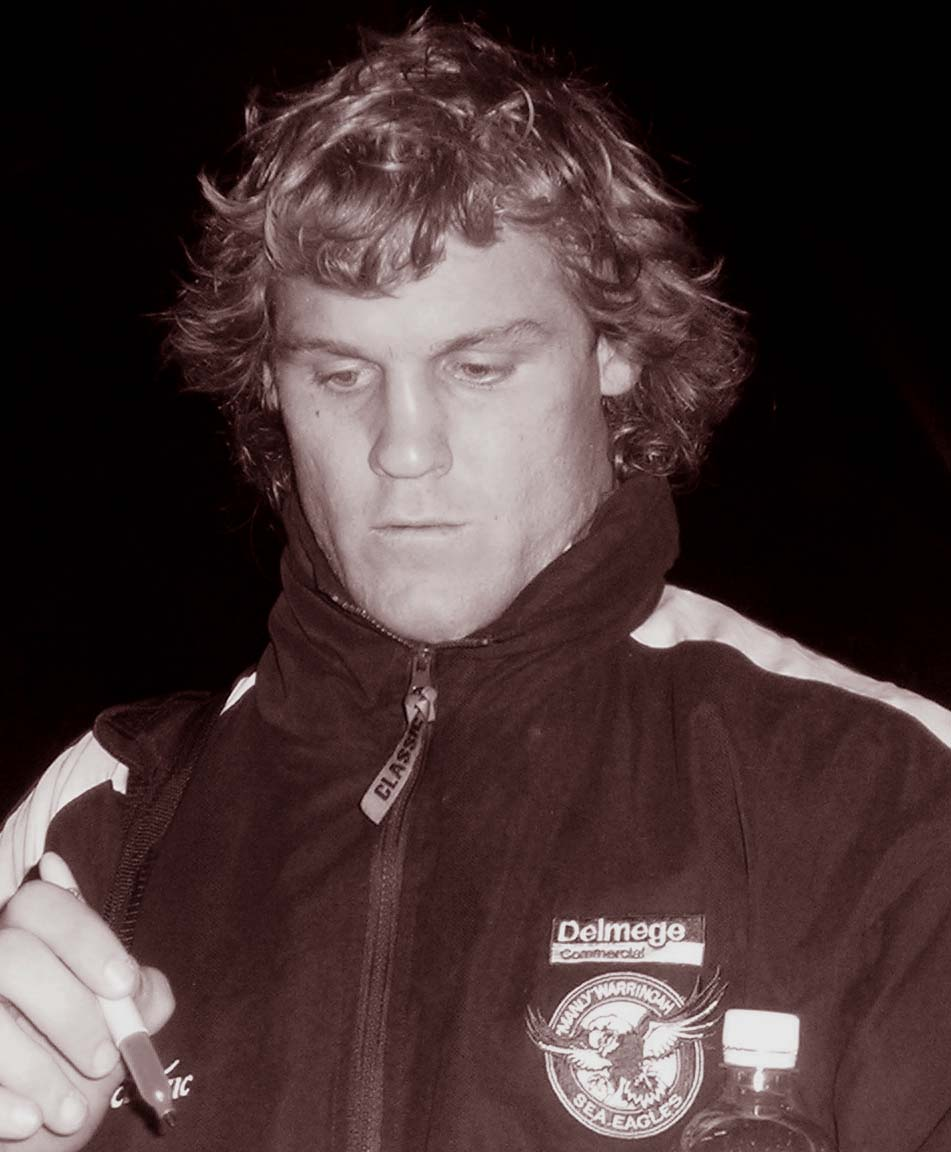
Williamson signing an autograph in 2005

After standout performances for the Adelaide Rams Under-19 team early in 1997, Rams first grade coach Rod Reddy selected Williamson to make his first grade début as an 18-year-old for the Rams in a surprise 16–12 win over the Auckland Warriors at the Ericsson Stadium in Auckland on 21 March 1997 during round 4 of the 1997 Super League season. Playing in the centres he kicked a late goal to help seal the Rams first ever away win. He would go on to be the Rams top point scorer in 1997 with 70 points from 12 games (3 tries, 29/37 goals). He backed that up with a further 17 games and 44 points in the 1998 NRL season. As the Rams folded after the 1998 season, Williamson remains the second highest point scorer for the club with 114 points, just two behind Graham Appo. His 45 goals is the record number kicked for the ill-fated club.

Despite being the Rams second highest point scorer, Williamson never led the team in points in either season, with Kurt Wrigley scoring 81 points in 1997 and Graham Appo scoring his 116 points in 1998.

=== Canberra Raiders ===
After the Rams folded before the start of the 1999 NRL season, Williamson signed with the Mal Meninga coached Canberra Raiders (the Rams actually had its season launch in early February, but owners News Limited pulled the plug on the club days later as part of the peace deal between Super League and the Australian Rugby League which resulted in the formation of the NRL). His first season with Canberra would be the most successful in his 14-year career. He played in 20 games, mostly on the Wing or at Centre and scored a career high 174 points from 6 tries and 74 goals after taking over the goal kicking duties from David Furner.

Williamson would play 41 games in three seasons with Canberra, scoring 8 tries and kicking 113 goals. An injury riddled final season at the club in 2001 saw him only play in 2 games, both from the bench. Following the season Williamson left Canberra and joined another new and short lived club, the Northern Eagles.

=== Northern Eagles ===
Luke Williamson played 16 games for the Northern Eagles in the 2002 NRL season. After playing his first three games from the bench, he would play the rest of the season at Five-eighth and again was the club's top scorer with 98 points from 3 tries and 45 goals.

=== Manly-Warringah Sea Eagles ===
The Northern Eagles, who had been formed as the result of an unhappy merger between long time rivals the Manly-Warringah Sea Eagles and the North Sydney Bears, folded after the 2002 season with the licence falling back to more financially stable Manly-Warringah. Williamson then signed with Manly where he would spend the rest of his playing career in Australia.

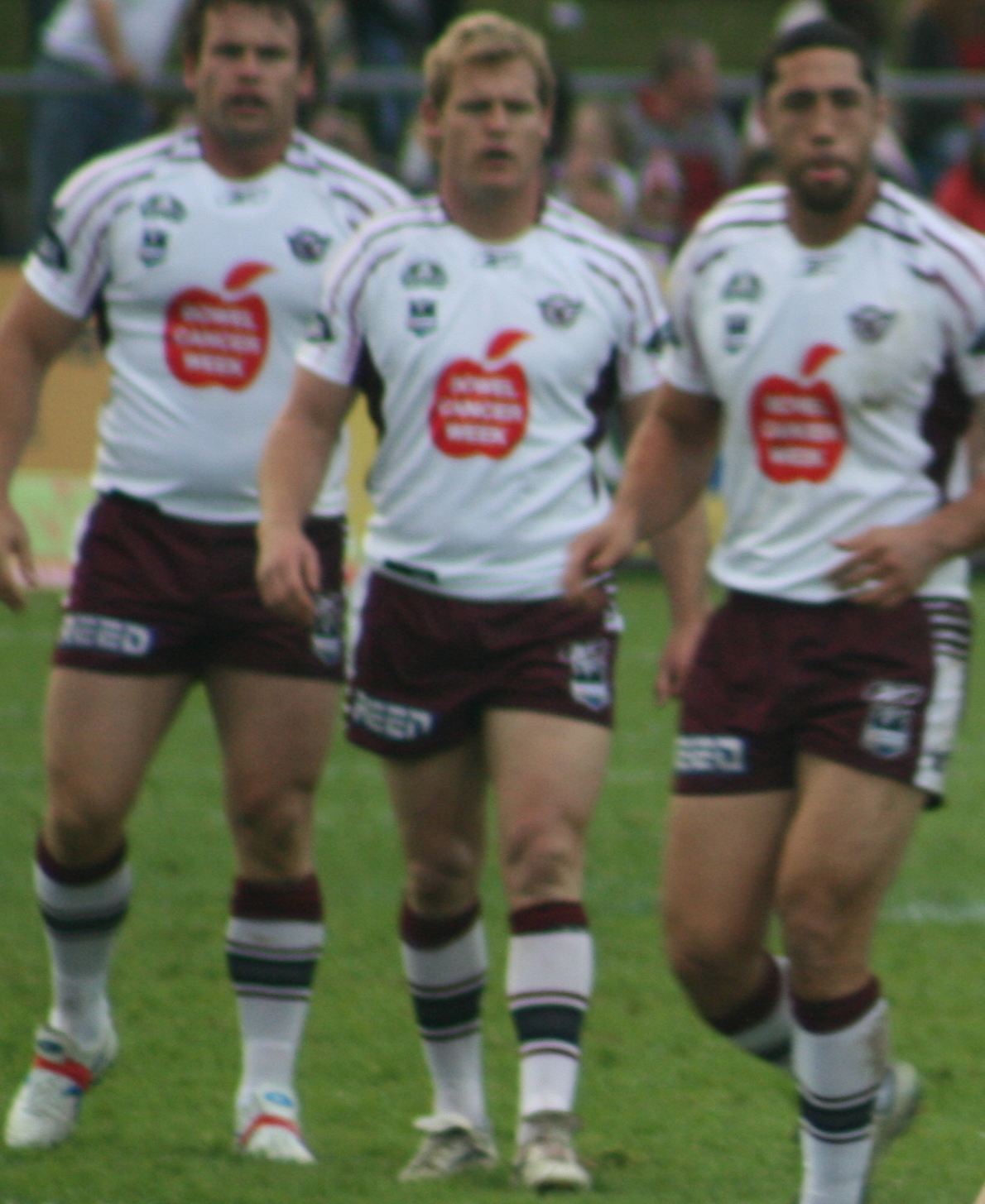
Williamson (centre) playing for Manly in 2008

After playing in the backs for most of his career, Williamson took on the role of Lock forward following the retirement of Ben Kennedy at the end of the 2006 season. He played in Manly's 2007 NRL Grand Final defeat by the Melbourne Storm, but missed out on the 2008 NRL Grand Final Centenary Grand Final against the Melbourne Storm due to injury. Manly defeated the Storm with the record Grand Final score of 40–0.

=== Harlequins ===
He joined London based Super League club Harlequins in 2009 and went on to play in 42 games with the club over two seasons before retiring from rugby league after the 2010 Super League season.

== Coaching ==
After retiring from rugby league in 2010, Williamson became a rugby league coach. He coached the Manly Sea Eagles NSW Cup team in 2011 before becoming the head coach of Manly's Toyota Cup team for 2012 with Manly club legend Cliff Lyons taking over as NSW Cup coach. Williamson is currently once again the coach of the Sea Eales NSW Cup team in 2013.

== Family ==
Luke Williamson is the son of Henry Williamson who represented Queensland in 1971 and later played with Newtown in 1973 and 1974. He is also the nephew of former Innisfail, Newtown, Qld, New South Wales and Australian and Halifax winger Lionel Williamson.
