= Peter Clarke (rugby league) =

Australian rugby league footballer

Personal information
- Full name: Peter Clarke
- Born: 2 May 1974 (age 52)

Playing information
- Position: Centre
Club
Years	Team	Pld	T	G	FG	P
1993	Manly-Warringah	1	0	0	0	0
1995–97	Eastern Suburbs	52	27	0	0	108
1998	Adelaide Rams	16	0	8	0	16
1999	South Sydney	1	0	0	0	0
	Total	70	27	8	0	124
- Relatives: Paul Clarke (brother)

Peter Clarke is an Australian former professional rugby league footballer who played in the 1990s. He played for Manly-Warringah, Eastern Suburbs, Adelaide Rams, and South Sydney as a centre.

== Playing career ==
Clarke made his first grade debut for Manly in Round 22 of the 1993 season against Western Suburbs. In 1995, Clarke joined Eastern Suburbs later renamed as the Sydney Roosters and enjoyed his best period in first grade. In 1996, Clarke played 24 games for the club as they reached the finals for the first time in a number of years. In 1998, Clarke joined the ill-fated Adelaide Rams and was a member of their last ever game a 34-20 loss against the Newcastle Knights. After the liquidation of Adelaide, Clarke joined South Sydney and ironically was involved in their final ever match as a first grade side which was a 34-16 loss to Parramatta. Souths were later readmitted to the competition in 2002 but this would prove to be Clarke's last ever game in first grade. Clarke played with Souths while they were excluded from the competition featuring in promotional games that were aimed at awareness and to gain support for a push to readmit Souths into the NRL.
