= Craig Bowen =

Former Cook Islands international rugby league footballer

Playing information
- Position: Five-eighth
Club
Years	Team	Pld	T	G	FG	P
1996	South Qld Crushers	4	0	0	0	0
1997	Gold Coast Chargers	1	1	0	0	4
1998	Adelaide Rams	4	1	0	0	4
	Total	9	2	0	0	8
Representative
Years	Team	Pld	T	G	FG	P
1995–00	Cook Islands	5	1	0	0	4

Craig Bowen is a former professional rugby league footballer who played as a five-eighth in the 1990s and 2000s. He played at representative level for the Cook Islands, and at club level for the Wests Panthers (two spells), the Illawarra Steelers (Reserve grade), South Queensland Crushers, Gold Coast Chargers and the Adelaide Rams.

== Playing career ==
Bowen began his career with the Wests Panthers in the Brisbane Rugby League competition, playing alongside Barry Berrigan.

Bowen signed with the Illawarra Steelers in 1995 but did not play a first grade match.

In 1996 he made his first grade debut in the Australian Rugby League competition, playing for the South Queensland Crushers. He spent 1997 with the Gold Coast Chargers before playing for the Adelaide Rams in 1997. Overall, he played in nine first grade matches, scoring two tries.

He then returned to the Wests Panthers, playing in the Queensland Cup.

== Representative career ==
Bowen first represented the Cook Islands in the 1995 Emerging Nations Tournament, which was won by the Cook Island team.

Bowen again represented the Cook Islands at the 2000 Rugby League World Cup, playing against Wales, New Zealand, and Lebanon.
