= Alan Wieland =

Australian professional rugby league player

Playing information
- Position: Second-row
Club
Years	Team	Pld	T	G	FG	P
1998	Adelaide Rams	7	1	0	0	4
- Source: As of 30 November 2024

Alan Wieland is an Australian former rugby league footballer who played for the Adelaide Rams in the National Rugby League (NRL).

Primarily a second-rower, he was twice named Player of the Year in the Queensland Cup while playing for the Wests Panthers.

== Background ==
Wieland was a ball boy for the Fortitude Valley Diehards in the 1970s while his father Vic played for the club. He was the ball boy for the 1979 Grand Final, which Valleys won 26–0 over Souths.

== Playing career ==
Wieland began his career with Valleys in the Brisbane Rugby League, playing Colts, reserve grade and first grade for the club. In 1987, he represented Queensland under-17 against New South Wales. In 1989, he was contracted to the Brisbane Broncos.

He later moved to the Wests Panthers, winning the final Queensland Rothmans Medal in 1996 and the first Queensland Cup Player of the Year award in 1997.

In 1998, Wieland joined the Adelaide Rams due to their partnership with Wests that season. In Round 16 of the 1998 NRL season, he made his NRL debut in a 40–12 win over the Gold Coast Chargers, starting at second-row and scoring a try. He played seven games for the Rams that season before returning to Wests, playing in their 1998 Grand Final loss to the Norths Devils.
