= Col Kimmorley =

Australian rules footballer

Personal information
- Full name: Colin Edgar Kimmorley
- Born: 24 August 1956 (age 70)
- Original team: Western Suburbs
- Height: 188 cm (6 ft 2 in)
- Weight: 85 kg (187 lb)

Playing career^{1}
Years	Club	Games (Goals)
1976	Collingwood	4 (1)
- ^{1} Playing statistics correct to the end of 1976.

Colin Edgar Kimmorley (born 24 August 1956) is a former Australian rules footballer who played with Collingwood in the Victorian Football League (VFL).
