= Kevin Campion (rugby league) =

Ireland international rugby league footballer

Personal information
- Born: 18 September 1971 (age 53); Sarina, Queensland, Australia

Playing information
- Position: Lock, Second-row
Club
Years	Team	Pld	T	G	FG	P
1993–95	Gold Coast Seagulls	44	3	6	0	24
1996	St. George Dragons	20	2	0	0	8
1997	Adelaide Rams	14	1	0	0	4
1998–00	Brisbane Broncos	80	9	0	0	36
2001–02	New Zealand Warriors	44	3	0	0	12
2003–04	North Qld Cowboys	39	2	0	0	8
	Total	241	20	6	0	92
Representative
Years	Team	Pld	T	G	FG	P
1997	Queensland (SL)	2	0	0	0	0
2000	Ireland	4	0	0	0	0
2001–02	Queensland	4	0	0	0	0

Kevin Campion (born 18 September 1971) is a former Ireland international rugby league footballer who played in the 1990s and 2000s. A Queensland State of Origin representative forward, he also played for Ireland in the 2000 Rugby League World Cup. Campion played his club football in Australia for Gold Coast Seagulls, St. George Dragons, Adelaide Rams, Brisbane Broncos, New Zealand Warriors and North Queensland Cowboys.

== Background ==
Campion was born in Sarina, Queensland, Australila.

Kevin is the younger brother of Australian radio personality Paul Campion. His younger brother Neil Campion was a coach at Aspley Junior Rugby League club.

== Career ==
Campion is one of three State of Origin representative products from Sarina State High School (along with Dale Shearer and Wendell Sailor), and one of four from the Sarina Crocodiles (along with Shearer, Sailor and Martin Bella).

Campion made his début for the Gold Coast Seagulls in 1993, and went on to play 44 games for the club before signing with St. George for the 1996 season. He played in the second-row in the Dragons' 8–20 loss to Manly in the Grand Final at the Sydney Football Stadium. It would be his last game for St. George as he had signed to play for the Adelaide Rams in the new Super League competition in 1997.

After joining the Rams, Campion was one of the team's stand-out players in the club's first season. He would make his representative début for Queensland during the 1997 Super League Tri-series that year but sensationally was told by Rams coach Rod Reddy that he was not part of his plans for the club in 1998.

After leaving Adelaide, Kevin Campion was snapped up by Brisbane Broncos coach Wayne Bennett, and went on to play 80 games for the club between 1998 and 2000, including the 1998 and 2000 NRL Grand Finals. He scored a try for Brisbane in their 38–12 win over the Canterbury-Bankstown Bulldogs in the 1998 decider.

Campion then signed with the New Zealand Warriors in 2001 and went on to play at lock forward in their 2002 NRL Grand Final loss to the Sydney Roosters. At half-time in that match, coach Daniel Anderson attempted to inspire the team by playing a mock commentary track of the Warriors scoring "the greatest try ever scored". Campion picked up the tape recorder, smashed it on the ground and gave the team an inspired speech instead.

This appearance made Campion one of only five players who have played in Grand Finals for three clubs during his career.

Campion also represented Queensland on six occasions: four times in the annual State of Origin series, and twice in the Super League Tri-series. He also helped Ireland to the quarter-finals in the 2000 World Cup. Whilst at the New Zealand Warriors, Campion was co-captain with New Zealand international halfback Stacey Jones.

== Retirement ==
Campion retired at the end of National Rugby League season 2004 with 241 first grade games. During the 2005 season he was involved in coaching with the New Zealand Warriors but has since returned to Gold Coast.
