= Dean Lance =

Australian rugby league coach and footballer

Personal information
- Full name: Dean Lawrence Lance
- Born: 4 April 1959 (age 67) Narrabri, New South Wales, Australia

Playing information
- Height: 178 cm (5 ft 10 in)
- Weight: 80 kg (12 st 8 lb)
- Position: Five-eighth, Centre, Lock
Club
| Years | Team | Pld | T | G | FG | P |
|---|---|---|---|---|---|---|
| 1982–83 | Newtown Jets | 40 | 6 | 0 | 0 | 24 |
| 1984–90 | Canberra Raiders | 160 | 2 | 0 | 0 | 8 |
| | Total | 200 | 8 | 0 | 0 | 32 |
Representative
| Years | Team | Pld | T | G | FG | P |
| 1977 | Newcastle |

Coaching information
Club
| Years | Team | Gms | W | D | L | W% |
| 1997 | Perth Reds | 18 | 7 | 0 | 11 | 39 |
| 1998 | Adelaide Rams | 14 | 6 | 0 | 8 | 43 |
| 1999–01 | Leeds Rhinos | 43 | 27 | 0 | 16 | 63 |
| | Total | 75 | 40 | 0 | 35 | 53 |

Dean Lance (born 4 April 1959) is an Australian former professional rugby league footballer and coach, and current football manager at the North Queensland Cowboys of the NRL. He played in the New South Wales Rugby Football League premiership in the 1980s for the Newtown and Canberra clubs, captaining the Raiders for almost 5 years and winning two premierships with them. After playing he coached Super League clubs in Australia (the Western Reds and the Adelaide Rams) and in England (the Leeds Rhinos).

== Playing career ==
A centre/five-eighth hailing from Narrabri, New South Wales, an eighteen-year-old Lance played representative rugby league for Newcastle in their comprehensive 29–0 victory over France in 1977 before playing in the NSWRFL. He started playing first grade in the Sydney premiership in 1982 for the Newtown Jets, but at the end of the following year the club exited the competition. Lance moved to the Canberra Raiders and after a few games in lime green was moved to the back row, where he established a reputation as one of the hardest workers in the NSWRL, despite conceding 10 kilograms (1 st 8 lb) in weight to most rivals. Lance was named captain of the Raiders in 1986 and played in his first Grand Final for Canberra in 1987. In 1989 the captaincy of the club was handed over to Mal Meninga, but Lance played in his second grand final, this time winning the premiership. In the post season he travelled with the Raiders to England for the 1989 World Club Challenge which was lost to Widnes. The following season was to be Lance's last as a player, but he went out on a high note, with a second consecutive premiership victory.

== Coaching career ==
Lance's coaching career began as reserve grade coach at Canberra in 1992, later being promoted to assistant coach. He took over from Peter Mulholland at the Perth Reds in the 1997 Super League season. The club was shut down at the end of that season so he signed as coach of the Adelaide Rams in the first year of the National Rugby League competition following Rod Reddy's dismissal. That was to be the final season for the Adelaide club as well, so again Lance was left without a team to coach. He moved to England and became coach of the Leeds Rhinos club in the Super League in November 1999, succeeding fellow Australian Graham Murray. He served there for three seasons, achieving mixed results and having a less than perfect relationship with the club. Just four matches into the 2001 season, Lance parted from the Leeds Rhinos "by mutual consent".

After returning to Australia, Lance took on a football manager's role at the Melbourne Storm club, working with coach and former Canberra teammate, Craig Bellamy. Following the Storm's premiership victory in 2007, Lance moved to the North Queensland Cowboys club, also as football manager.

Sporting positions
| Preceded by Ron Giteau; 1984–1985 | Captain; Canberra Raiders; 1985–1989 | Succeeded by Mal Meninga; 1989–1994 |
