= Val Murphy =

PNG international rugby league coach (born 1939)

Personal information
- Born: 1939 (age 85–86)

Coaching information
Representative
Years	Team	Gms	W	D	L	W%
1975	Papua New Guinea	1	0	0	1	0

Val Murphy (born 1939) coached the Papua New Guinea Kumuls in 1975.
