= Chris Blair (rugby league) =

Australian rugby league footballer

Personal information
- Full name: Christopher Blair
- Born: 26 February 1964 (age 62)

Playing information
- Position: Second-row
Club
Years	Team	Pld	T	G	FG	P
1985	Penrith Panthers	2	0	0	0	0
1988–89	Western Suburbs	17	1	0	0	4
	Total	19	1	0	0	4
- Source: As of 28 December 2022
- Relatives: Cameron Blair (brother)

Chris Blair is an Australian former professional rugby league footballer who played in the 1980s. He played for Western Suburbs and Penrith in the NSWRL competition.

== Background ==
Blair is the older brother of Cameron Blair who played 183 first grade games between 1986-1997.

== Playing career ==
Blair made his first grade debut for Penrith in round 11 of the 1985 NSWRL season against Western Suburbs at Penrith Stadium. Blair made one further appearance that year against Balmain. Later that year, Penrith would qualify for their first finals series since entering the competition in 1967.

In 1988, Blair joined Western Suburbs however the club would struggle on the field finishing with the wooden spoon. Blair spent one further year at Western Suburbs with his final appearance in the top grade coming against his former team Penrith where Wests lost 37-0.
