= Cameron Blair (rugby league) =

Australian rugby league footballer

Personal information
- Full name: Cameron John Blair
- Born: 6 July 1966 (age 60) Australia

Playing information
- Position: Second-row, Lock
Club
Years	Team	Pld	T	G	FG	P
1988–91	Western Suburbs	73	5	0	0	20
1992–95	Parramatta Eels	79	7	0	0	28
1996	Western Reds	14	0	0	0	0
1997	Adelaide Rams	16	3	0	0	12
	Total	182	15	0	0	60
- Source: stats.rleague.com As of 18 January 2019
- Relatives: Chris Blair (brother)

Cameron Blair (born 6 July 1966) is an Australian former professional rugby league footballer who played in the 1980s and 1990s for Western Suburbs, Parramatta, the Western Reds and Adelaide.

== Playing career ==
Blair made his debut for the Western Suburbs Magpies in 1988. He played in every game that season (and again in 1989) and was named the competition's Rookie of the Year.

Blair started as captain for the 1989 season, before handing over to Ellery Hanley mid-season. With his contract about to expire, Blair received offers from other clubs. He was offered a substantial contract to join Manly, but re-signed with Wests for a further 2 seasons.

In 1990, Blair was again a regular in first grade, but with the arrival of new coach Warren Ryan in 1991 Blair was often playing from the bench behind newly arrived players like Ron Gibbs, David Gillespie and Bob Lindner. He played in just 9 games in his last season before leaving the club. Blair totalled 73 games for the Magpies over four years.

Blair then spent four seasons with the Parramatta Eels before finishing his career with one year spells at two new franchises, the Western Reds and the Adelaide Rams. Blair once held the record for most first grade games played without featuring in a finals game in NSWRL/NRL history until it was later overtaken by Luke Brooks.
