= David Westley =

PNG international rugby league footballer

Personal information
- Born: 7 June 1974 (age 51) Panguna, Bougainville, Papua New Guinea

Playing information
- Height: 183 cm (6 ft 0 in)
- Weight: 109 kg (17 st 2 lb)
- Position: Prop
Club
Years	Team	Pld	T	G	FG	P
1993–99	Canberra Raiders	98	7	0	0	28
2000–01	Parramatta Eels	33	1	0	0	4
2002	Northern Eagles	12	0	0	0	0
	Total	143	8	0	0	32
Representative
Years	Team	Pld	T	G	FG	P
1995–01	Papua New Guinea	5	0	0	0	0

Coaching information
Representative
Years	Team	Gms	W	D	L	W%
2018	PNG Prime Minister's XIII Women	1	0	0	1	0

David Westley (born 7 June 1974) is a former professional rugby league footballer and assistant coach of the Papua New Guinea. A Papua New Guinea international front-rower, he played club football for the Canberra Raiders, with whom he won the 1994 Winfield Cup Premiership before spending time with the Parramatta Eels and the Northern Eagles.

== Playing career ==
Westley's junior club was the Cairns Kangaroos. He was Canberra's Rookie of the Year in 1993, and was a part of the Grand Final winning side in 1994 as they defeated Canterbury-Bankstown in the decider. As of the 2020 NRL season, this has been Canberra's last premiership victory.

The following year, Westley was selected to play for Papua New Guinea in the 1995 World Cup in England. Westley played for Canberra until the end of the 1999 NRL season before departing the club to sign with Parramatta. Westley played 25 games for Parramatta in his first season at the club as they reached the preliminary final against Brisbane which Parramatta lost 16–10 at Stadium Australia. He played eight games the following year at Parramatta finished as runaway Minor Premiers. He was selected to start in the Front row for Papua New Guinea in a test match against the defending world champions Australia coming up with a brilliant offload to put John Wilshire over the line. In 2002, he signed for the Northern Eagles playing twelve games. He then returned to Cairns to coach the senior side.
