= Matt Daylight =

Scotland international rugby league footballer

Personal information
- Full name: Matthew Daylight
- Born: 2 March 1974 (age 52) Australia

Playing information
- Position: Wing
Club
| Years | Team | Pld | T | G | FG | P |
|---|---|---|---|---|---|---|
| 1995 | Cronulla Sharks | 2 | 1 | 0 | 0 | 4 |
| 1997 | Perth Reds | 11 | 3 | 0 | 0 | 12 |
| 1998 | Adelaide Rams | 20 | 7 | 0 | 0 | 28 |
| 1999 | Gateshead Thunder | 30 | 25 | 0 | 0 | 100 |
| 2000 | Hull FC | 22 | 12 | 0 | 0 | 48 |
| 2001 | Cronulla Sharks | 3 | 1 | 0 | 0 | 4 |
| | Total | 88 | 49 | 0 | 0 | 196 |
Representative
| Years | Team | Pld | T | G | FG | P |
| 2000 | Scotland | 3 | 0 | 0 | 0 | 0 |

Matthew "Matt" Daylight (born 2 March 1974) is a former Scotland rugby league footballer who played on the wing. A speedy outside back, he played for five different clubs throughout his career in both Australia and England.

== Career ==
=== Australia ===
Daylight began his rugby league career with the Cronulla-Sutherland Sharks in 1995, playing two games for the club in his debut season. In 1997, Daylight made the move to the Western Reds, who were competing in the Australian Super League at the time. His most successful stint in Australia was in the inaugural season of the National Rugby League when he played for the Adelaide Rams. Daylight played 20 games for the Rams, scoring seven tries.

Daylight's last season was again with Cronulla in 2001, where he played just three games and scored one try.

=== England ===
After the Rams were dissolved prior to the 1999 NRL season, Daylight linked with the Gateshead Thunder in 1999, scoring 25 tries in 30 appearances for the club. He then left the Thunder to join Hull FC in 2000, scoring 12 tries in 22 games.

== Representative career ==
Daylight was also selected as a Scotland international and played at the 2000 Rugby League World Cup.
