= Stuart Topper =

Australian rugby league footballer

Personal information
- Born: 27 February 1971 (age 54) Australia

Playing information
- Position: Halfback
Club
Years	Team	Pld	T	G	FG	P
1987–94	Cronulla Sharks	126	34	0	0	136
1995	St. George Dragons	18	7	0	0	28
1996	Gold Coast Chargers	9	5	0	0	20
1997	Adelaide Rams	14	2	0	0	8
	Total	167	48	0	0	192

Stuart Topper is an Australian former professional rugby league footballer who played in Australia.

== Playing career ==
Topper played for the Miranda Magpies before signing with the Cronulla-Sutherland Sharks in 1988. He played in fourteen games in his debut season and scored two tries. Topper remained with the Sharks until 1994, when he joined the Gold Coast Seagulls.

Topper signed with the new Adelaide Rams franchise in 1997 and played in their inaugural match. He played in 14 games for the Rams that season. Topper travelled to the UK playing in Super Leagues world club challenge with the Rams. Topper retired at the end of 1997 season after ten years of professional football.
