= Andrew Pierce (rugby league) =

Australian rugby league footballer

Personal information
- Born: 14 January 1974 (age 52) Sydney, New South Wales, Australia

Playing information
- Position: Prop, Second-row, Lock
Club
Years	Team	Pld	T	G	FG	P
1993–96	Cronulla Sharks	55	2	0	0	8
1997–98	Adelaide Rams	34	1	0	1	5
1999–02	Cronulla Sharks	91	5	0	0	20
2002–04	Leigh Centurions
2005	Gateshead Thunder	14	2	0	0	8
	Total	194	10	0	1	41
- Source: As of 30 November 2024

Andrew Pierce (born 14 January 1974) is an Australian former professional rugby league footballer who played for the Cronulla-Sutherland Sharks and the Adelaide Rams.

== Biography ==
Pierce, a forward recruited locally from De La Salle College, Cronulla, made his first-grade debut for Cronulla in the 1993 NSWRL season.

After four seasons at Cronulla, he joined the inaugural Adelaide Rams squad, to compete in the 1997 Super League, remaining with the club when they switched to the National Rugby League the following year.

In 1999 returned to Cronulla after the Rams folded. Cronulla claimed the minor premiership that season and Pierce featured in all 26 games, including the preliminary final loss to St. George Illawarra.

Following the 2002 season, Pierce had left Cronulla to play for Leigh in England.

His father, Barry Pierce, was a long serving chairman of the Cronulla-Sutherland Sharks. He also has a brother Greg, not to be confused with the former player, who was the club's CEO from 2006 to 2007.
