= Rod Maybon =

Australian rugby league footballer

Personal information
- Born: 8 January 1970 (age 56) Leeton, New South Wales, Australia

Playing information
- Position: Fullback, Halfback
Club
Years	Team	Pld	T	G	FG	P
1988–93	South Sydney	78	10	33	1	107
1994–95	St. George Dragons	35	9	0	0	36
1996	Parramatta Eels	19	5	0	0	20
1997–98	Adelaide Rams	15	6	0	0	24
1999	Canberra Raiders	9	3	0	0	12
	Total	156	33	33	1	199

Rod Maybon (born 8 January 1970) is an Australian former professional rugby league footballer who played in the 1980s and 1990s. He played for the South Sydney Rabbitohs, St. George Dragons, Parramatta Eels, Adelaide Rams and Canberra Raiders. He primarily played at Fullback.

== Playing career ==
=== Souths ===
Maybon was graded to South Sydney as a 17-year-old in 1987, and made his first grade debut for the Rabbitohs in round 21 of the 1988 season, playing at halfback against the Gold Coast Giants at the Sydney Football Stadium. This was Maybon's only game of first grade in 1988 and he would only make two appearances for the Rabbitohs in their 1989 season in which they finished minor premiers after losing only three games in the regular season that year. Maybon played his first game at fullback against the Canberra Raiders at Bruce Stadium in round 7 of the Rabbitohs' ill-fated 1990 season in which they finished wooden spooners after winning only two games.

From 1990 until 1993, Maybon was more of a regular in the Rabbitohs' team. In his six-year stint with the Rabbitohs, Maybon played 78 games and scored 107 points. In 1994, after failing to secure an adequate contract with South Sydney (who were in financial trouble at the time and could only offer him a reduced salary), he moved to the St. George Dragons and played with them until the end of the 1995 season. His departure from the Rabbitohs caused significant controversy within the club with many ordinary members of the club extremely disappointed with the decision to release him.

=== St. George ===
Maybon joined St. George in the 1994 season and went on to play 35 games for the club. After two years with the Dragons, in which he scored 9 tries, Maybon decided to join the Parramatta Eels in 1996.

=== Parramatta ===
In 1996, Maybon played for the Parramatta Eels. Despite making 19 appearances for the Eels in the 1996 season and scoring 5 tries, the Eels had a lackluster season, finishing 13th after winning only 9 games that year. Maybon moved again at the end of the 1996 season. He opted to sign for newly formed Super League club the Adelaide Rams for the split 1997 season.

=== Adelaide ===
In 1997, Maybon moved to the newly formed entity the Adelaide Rams on a two-year deal. Maybon played a senior role at the club. Maybon played 13 games and scored 5 tries and finished the 1997 season as the team's equal top try scorer along with Kurt Wrigley. Despite these efforts, the Rams finished 9th in the 1997 Super League season and only finished one point ahead of wooden spooners, the North Queensland Cowboys. The Adelaide Rams remained in the new unified 1998 competition. Maybon also remained with the Rams in the 1998 season. Injuries limited Maybon's appearances to just two games in the 1998 season. With the dissolution of the Rams at season's end, Maybon was yet again on the move. He (along with several Rams teammates) moved to the Canberra Raiders for the 1999 NRL season.

=== Canberra ===
In 1999, Maybon played his final season of rugby league at the Canberra Raiders. He made 9 appearances for the Raiders, and despite most of these appearances being from the bench, he scored three tries.

=== Retirement ===
Maybon trained with the Canberra team at the start of the 2000 season before announcing his retirement. He finished his career having played 156 games, scoring 33 tries, as well as kicking 33 goals and 1 field goal.
