= Noel Goldthorpe =

Australian rugby league footballer

Personal information
- Born: 25 December 1969 (age 56) Botany, New South Wales, Australia

Playing information
- Height: 5 ft 5 in (166 cm)
- Position: Halfback
Club
Years	Team	Pld	T	G	FG	P
1990–91	Western Suburbs	5	0	0	0	0
1992–96	St. George Dragons	106	25	44	16	204
1997	Hunter Mariners	14	3	8	0	28
1998	Adelaide Rams	22	1	1	0	6
1999–00	North Qld Cowboys	35	1	28	0	60
	Total	182	30	81	16	298
Representative
Years	Team	Pld	T	G	FG	P
1997	New South Wales (SL)	3	0	0	1	1

Noel Goldthorpe (born 25 December 1969) is an Australian former professional rugby league footballer who played in the halves in the 1990s. He played most of his career for the St George Dragons. Goldthorpe also played for the Western Suburbs Magpies, Hunter Mariners, Adelaide Rams and the North Queensland Cowboys, whom he captained.

== Background ==
Goldthorpe was born in Botany, New South Wales, Australia.

== Career ==
Goldthorpe was originally a South Sydney junior from the Botany Rams club. Although he also played some junior rugby league in the St George district with the Kyeemagh club.

Goldthorpe made his first grade debut for Western Suburbs on 1 July 1990, coming off the bench in a loss to Cronulla. It was his only appearance for the season. He made 5 appearances for the Magpies in 1991, 4 off the bench. His sole starting game for the club was in round when regular halfback Jason Taylor was dropped to the bench by coach Warren Ryan after a poor game.

Having led the Magpies reserve grade team to the semi-finals, Goldthorpe was hoping to re-sign with the team for 1992. He said, "I was shattered They said I could stay if I wanted but there'd be no money. They really didn't want me. I was driving home from Western Suburbs thinking 'what am I going to do?'" He approached St. George coach Brian Smith, and signed a one-year contract. Goldthorpe then went on to play with St George for 5 seasons including 3 grand final losses in 1992, 1993 and 1996.

Goldthorpe is notable for breaking the deadlock with a field goal for New South Wales in what was the longest recorded game of rugby league: the final of the 1997 Super League Tri-series against Queensland. In an ironic twist, however, he lost his starting spot at his club due to the impressive debut of Brett Kimmorley who had played in his stead while he was on representative duty with New South Wales.

After leaving St George at the end of 1996, Goldthorpe joined the Hunter Mariners for their first and only season as a club. The team finished 6th in the Super League competition but were liquidated at the end of the year. Goldthorpe then joined the now defunct Adelaide Rams and played in their final ever match as a club, which was a 34–20 loss against Newcastle. In 1999, Goldthorpe joined North Queensland and played two seasons for the club. Goldthorpe later became captain of the team. His final year in first grade ended with a wooden spoon as North Queensland finished last on the table.

Goldthorpe was later the captain-coach of the Noosa Pirates in the Sunshine Coast Rugby League competition.

== Sources ==
- Dale Mitchell (2 April 2008). "Legend Q&A". Rugby League Week. pp. 30–31.
