= Joe Tokam =

Former PNG international rugby league coach

Personal information
- Full name: Joe Kuman Tokam
- Born: Papua New Guinea

Coaching information
Representative
Years	Team	Gms	W	D	L	W%
1993–95	Papua New Guinea	3	1	1	1	33
- Source: As of 4 February 2021

Joe Tokam is a Papua New Guinean rugby league coach and administrator who coached Papua New Guinea at the 1995 World Cup.

== Playing career ==
Tokam retired from playing in 1983.

== Coaching career ==
Tokam coached Papua New Guinea in the 1995 World Cup. The team drew with Tonga and then lost to New Zealand. His one win was v Fiji on 19 Jun 1993, beating them 35–24 in Port Moresby

== Administration career ==
In 2009 he worked as the operations manager for the bemobile Cup.

In 2011 Tokram worked as the PNGRFL Highlands regional development officer.

Tokram, along with Ivan Ravu, was appointed a caretaker manager of the Papua New Guinea Rugby League after the districts failed to meet the quorum to hold an AGM in early 2012.

In mid-2012 he was involved in legal action against the PNGRL. The court ruled the legal action invalid and ruled that he was no longer an employee of the PNGRL.
