= Danny Grimley =

Australian rugby league footballer

Personal information
- Born: 29 August 1972 (age 52)

Playing information
- Position: Centre
Club
Years	Team	Pld	T	G	FG	P
1995	Parramatta Eels	1	0	0	0	0
1996–97	Sheffield Eagles
1997–98	Adelaide Rams	19	4	0	0	16
	Total	20	4	0	0	16

Danny Grimley (born 29 August 1972) is an Australian former professional rugby league footballer who played for the Parramatta Eels and Adelaide Rams.

== Playing career ==
Grimley started his first-grade career at Parramatta, where he made one appearance in the 1995 ARL season.

In 1996, Grimley played in England's Super League for the Sheffield Eagles, before returning to Australia in 1997 and joining the new Adelaide Rams franchise.

Grimley was with Adelaide for both of their two seasons in the national competition, playing six first-grade games in 1997 and 13 in 1998, mostly as a centre. Grimley played in the club's last ever game as a first grade side which was a 34–20 loss against Newcastle.
