= Craig Kimmorley =

Australian rugby league footballer (born 1974)

Personal information
- Full name: Craig Kimmorley
- Born: 18 September 1974 (age 51) Belmont, New South Wales, Australia

Playing information
- Position: Five-eighth, Halfback
Club
Years	Team	Pld	T	G	FG	P
1995	Newcastle Knights	2	0	0	0	0
1998	Adelaide	3	0	3	0	6
1999	Eastern Suburbs	7	0	2	0	4
	Total	12	0	5	0	10
- Source: As of 23 January 2019
- Relatives: Brett Kimmorley (brother)

Craig Kimmorley (born 18 September 1974) is an Australian former professional rugby league footballer who played during the 1990s. He played for the Newcastle Knights in 1995, the Hunter Mariners 97, the Adelaide Rams in 1998 and finally the Sydney City Roosters in 1999. He is the older brother of former NSW and Australian halfback Brett Kimmorley.
