= Chris Quinn (rugby league) =

Australian rugby league footballer

Personal information
- Full name: Chris Quinn
- Born: 26 June 1968 (age 56); Cronulla, New South Wales, Australia

Playing information
- Height: 181 cm (5 ft 11 in)
- Weight: 82 kg (12 st 13 lb)
- Position: Fullback, Centre, Five-eighth
Club
Years	Team	Pld	T	G	FG	P
1989–94	Cronulla-Sutherland	72	10	0	0	40
1995–96	St. George Dragons	30	5	0	0	20
1997–98	Adelaide Rams	34	3	0	0	12
1999	Parramatta Eels	16	1	0	0	4
	Total	152	19	0	0	76
- Source: RLP

Chris Quinn is an Australian former rugby league footballer who played in the 1980s and 1990s for Cronulla-Sutherland, St George, Adelaide and Parramatta. Quinn was a utility back and played in Adelaide's inaugural match.

== Playing career ==
Quinn was a St Patricks junior in the Cronulla-Sutherland District Rugby Football League. Quinn went on to play for the Cronulla Sharks between 1989 and 1994.

Quinn then played for the St. George Dragons between 1995 and 1996. In 1996, Quinn played in 3 of the club's finals matches but missed out on in playing in the grand final against Manly.

Quinn then played in the Adelaide Rams inaugural side and finished his career with the Parramatta Eels in 1999.
