= Steve Stone (rugby league) =

Australian rugby league footballer

Personal information
- Born: 24 March 1969 (age 55); Australia

Playing information
- Position: Halfback, Second-row, Lock
Club
Years	Team	Pld	T	G	FG	P
1990–96	Canberra Raiders	65	7	0	0	28
1997	Adelaide Rams	14	3	0	0	12
	Total	79	10	0	0	40
- Source: RLP

Steve Stone is an Australian rugby league footballer who played professionally for the Canberra Raiders and the Adelaide Rams.

== Playing career ==
Stone made his first grade debut for the Canberra Raiders in 1990, replacing Mal Meninga as a substitute. He played for the Raiders for seven seasons, mainly as a halfback but also starting games in the Second Row and at Lock.

In 1997 Stone signed with the new Adelaide Rams franchise in the Super League.
