= Joe Tamani =

Fiji international rugby league footballer (born 1972)

Personal information
- Born: 12 May 1972 (age 53); Levuka, Fiji

Playing information
- Position: Wing, Centre, Second-row
Club
Years	Team	Pld	T	G	FG	P
1996	Bradford Bulls	19	4	0	0	16
1997–98	Adelaide Rams	21	6	0	0	24
	Total	40	10	0	0	40
Representative
Years	Team	Pld	T	G	FG	P
1996–00	Fiji	3	0	0	0	0

Joe Tamani is a Fijian rugby league footballer who represented Fiji in the 2000 World Cup.

== Playing career ==
Tamani played for the Bradford Bulls in 1996's Super League I, before signing for new Australasian Super League franchise the Adelaide Rams in 1997. He was part of their inaugural side on 1 March against the North Queensland Cowboys and remained with the squad during the 1998 season. Tamani became a favourite of the Adelaide crowd and scored six tries in his 21 games for the ill-fated club which was shut down only weeks before the 1999 NRL season.

Tamani first represented Fiji in 1996 and in 2000 Tamani was selected as part Fiji's World Cup squad.

In 2000, Tamani was playing for the Cabramatta Two Blues.
