= Andrew Hick =

Australian rugby league footballer

Personal information
- Full name: Andrew Hick
- Born: 11 February 1971 (age 55) Sydney, New South Wales, Australia
- Height: 192 cm (6 ft 4 in)
- Weight: 103 kg (16 st 3 lb)

Playing information
- Position: Prop, Second-row
Club
Years	Team	Pld	T	G	FG	P
1991–95	Cronulla-Sutherland	44	3	0	0	12
1996	Western Suburbs	10	1	0	0	4
1997–98	Adelaide Rams	35	3	0	0	12
1999	Gateshead Thunder	17	2	0	0	8
2000	Hull FC	13	1	0	0	4
	Total	119	10	0	0	40
- Source: As of 22 January 2019

Andrew Hick (born 11 February 1971) is an Australian former rugby league footballer who played professionally in England and Australia.

== Playing career ==
Hick played for the Engadine Dragons before making his début for the local Cronulla-Sutherland Sharks in the NSWRL Premiership in 1991. He played in 44 matches for the Sharks over the next five years before transferring to the Western Suburbs Magpies in 1996. In 1997 he switched to Super League, joining the new Adelaide Rams franchise.

In 1999 Hick moved to England, spending one season each with the new Gateshead Thunder club in 1999 and Hull FC in 2000. He was one of several former Sharks players who played for the Thunder. Hick retired at the end of the 2000 season.
