= Dave Boughton =

Australian rugby league footballer

Personal information
- Full name: David Boughton
- Born: 27 February 1970 (age 55); Australia

Playing information
- Position: Second-row, Lock
Club
Years	Team	Pld	T	G	FG	P
1991–96	Cronulla Sharks	82	10	0	0	40
1997–98	Adelaide Rams	17	1	0	0	4
1999	Huddersfield Giants	27	4	0	0	16
	Total	126	15	0	0	60
- Source: RLP

Dave Boughton is an Australian former professional rugby league footballer who played professionally in England and Australia.

== Playing career ==
Boughton was an Engadine Dragons junior in the Cronulla-Sutherland District Rugby Football League. In 1991 he made his first grade début for the Cronulla Sharks. He played 82 games for the club between 1991 and 1996 before signing for the new Adelaide Rams franchise in 1997. Boughton was part of the inaugural Rams side on 1 March 1997 and played in seventeen matches for the club over two seasons.

After being the subject of a bidding war between Newcastle and Huddersfield, Boughton signed for the Huddersfield Giants for the 1999 season. He played in twenty seven matches that year before retiring.
