= Mark Corvo =

Australian rugby league footballer

Personal information
- Full name: Mark Corvo
- Born: 17 June 1973 (age 52) Canberra, Australian Capital Territory, Australia

Playing information
- Height: 187 cm (6 ft 2 in)
- Weight: 110 kg (17 st 5 lb)
- Position: Prop
Club
Years	Team	Pld	T	G	FG	P
1993–96	Canberra Raiders	23	1	0	0	4
1997–98	Adelaide Rams	36	2	0	0	8
1999–00	Canberra Raiders	27	0	1	0	2
2001	Brisbane Broncos	8	0	0	0	0
2002	Salford City Reds	12	0	0	0	0
	Total	106	3	1	0	14
- Relatives: Alex Corvo (brother)

Mark Corvo (born 17 June 1973) is an Australian former professional rugby league footballer who played as a prop-forward for the Canberra Raiders, Adelaide Rams and the Brisbane Broncos in the NRL.

== Background ==
Corvo was born in Canberra, Australian Capital Territory.

His brother, Alex Corvo, also played for the Canberra Raiders.

== Playing career ==
Corvo made his first grade debut for Canberra against Penrith in Round 2 1993. In 1997, Corvo joined Adelaide at the height of the Super League war and played in the club's final ever game which was a 34–20 loss against Newcastle. In 1999, Corvo rejoined Canberra spending 2 seasons there before signing with defending premiers Brisbane in 2001 before retiring.

== Career playing statistics ==
=== Point scoring summary ===
Games	Tries	Goals	F/G	Points
95	3	1	-	14

=== Matches played ===
Team	Matches	Years
Canberra Raiders	50	1993, 1995–1996, 1999–2000
Adelaide Rams	36	1997–1998
Brisbane Broncos	8	2001
