= Wayne Simonds =

Australian rugby league footballer

Personal information
- Full name: Wayne Simonds
- Born: 16 August 1966 (age 58)

Playing information
- Position: Fullback, Wing
Club
Years	Team	Pld	T	G	FG	P
1988–93	Western Suburbs	82	21	0	0	84
1994	Parramatta Eels	6	1	0	0	4
1995	South Queensland	20	2	0	0	8
1997–98	Adelaide Rams	23	6	0	0	24
1999	Featherstone Rovers	27	19	0	0	76
	Total	158	49	0	0	196
- Source: RLP

Wayne Simonds is an Australian former professional rugby league footballer who played in the 1980s and 1990s, he played in the New South Wales Rugby League premiership, Australian Rugby League and Super League competitions.

== Playing career ==
Simonds began his career with the Western Suburbs Magpies in 1988. Simons played for the Magpies for six seasons and scored 21 tries in 82 games.

Nearing the end of his career, Simonds left the Magpies in 1994, joining the Parramatta Eels. Simonds spent only one year with the club before joining the South Queensland Crushers for their inaugural 1995 season. In 1997, Simonds joined the new Adelaide Rams franchise and was also in their inaugural side. While remaining with the Rams in 1998, Simonds also played for the Wests Panthers in the Queensland Cup.
