= Brett Galea =

Australian rugby league footballer

Personal information
- Born: 25 June 1972 (age 54) Brisbane, Queensland, Australia

Playing information
- Position: Second-row
Club
Years	Team	Pld	T	G	FG	P
1993–96	Brisbane Broncos	32	3	0	0	12
1997–98	Adelaide Rams	19	3	0	0	12
	Total	51	6	0	0	24
- Source: RLP
- Relatives: Paul Galea (brother)

Brett Galea (born 25 June 1972) is an Australian former professional rugby league footballer who played professionally for the Brisbane Broncos and Adelaide Rams.

His brother, Paul, also played professionally for Gold Coast and North Queensland Cowboys.

== Playing career ==
Galea was a Fortitude Valley Diehards junior before joining the Brisbane Broncos in the NSWRL Premiership in 1992. He won the clubs Rookie of the Year award that year and remained with the club until the end of the 1996 season.

In 1997 Galea joined the new Adelaide Rams franchise and played in their inaugural match. He remained with the Rams for two seasons.

In 1999 Galea played for the Magpies in the Mackay District Rugby League competition and won the Patton Medal.
