= Graham Appo =

Australian rugby league footballer

Personal information
- Born: 11 July 1974 (age 51); Southport, Australia

Playing information
- Height: 176 cm (5 ft 9 in)
- Weight: 85 kg (13 st 5 lb)
- Position: Wing, Fullback, Five-eighth, Centre
Club
Years	Team	Pld	T	G	FG	P
1994–98	Canberra Raiders	20	7	3	0	34
1998	Adelaide Rams	14	12	34	0	116
1999	Sydney City Roosters	3	0	5	0	10
2000	North Qld Cowboys	15	4	3	0	22
2001	Huddersfield Giants	7	4	0	0	16
2002–05	Warrington Wolves	73	35	80	0	300
	Total	132	62	125	0	498

Graham Appo (born 11 July 1974) is an Indigenous Australian former professional rugby league footballer of the 1990s and 2000s. He played throughout the back-line during his long career and was also a talented goal-kicker. Appo started playing first-grade club football in the New South Wales Rugby League premiership for the Canberra Raiders in 1994, winning the club's rookie of the year award. Early in the 1998 season, he joined the Adelaide Rams for their final season in the NRL, setting club records for most tries in a match (3), most tries in a season (12), most goals in a match (8), most points in a match (24) and most points for a season (116). He then moved to the Sydney City Roosters and later the North Queensland Cowboys for a season each.

Appo embarked on a career in the English Super League after the 2000 NRL season. In England, he played for the Huddersfield Giants and Warrington Wolves. Appo's best year came in 2003 when, covering at stand-off for the injured Lee Briers, he scored 23 tries for Warrington, in one game scoring a total of 34 points, which was the second-highest individual points haul for a player in Super League at the time. He was later named in that year's Super League Dream Team.
