= Tony Iro =

RL coach & former NZ international rugby league footballer

Personal information
- Full name: Tony Roy Iro
- Born: 30 May 1967 (age 59) Auckland, New Zealand
- Height: 192 cm (6 ft 4 in)
- Weight: 98 kg (15 st 6 lb)

Playing information
- Position: Second-row, Wing
Club
| Years | Team | Pld | T | G | FG | P |
|---|---|---|---|---|---|---|
| | Mt Albert |
| 1987–89 | Wigan | 50 | 23 | 0 | 0 | 92 |
| 1990–93 | Manly Sea Eagles | 72 | 13 | 0 | 0 | 52 |
| 1990–91 | Leigh | 11 | 4 | 0 | 0 | 16 |
| 1994–96 | Sydney City | 60 | 11 | 0 | 0 | 44 |
| 1997 | Hunter Mariners | 20 | 3 | 0 | 0 | 12 |
| 1998 | Adelaide Rams | 20 | 1 | 0 | 0 | 4 |
| 1999 | South Sydney | 22 | 1 | 0 | 0 | 4 |
| | Total | 255 | 56 | 0 | 0 | 224 |
Representative
| Years | Team | Pld | T | G | FG | P |
| | Auckland |
| 1988–98 | New Zealand | 25 | 4 | 0 | 0 | 16 |

Coaching information
Club
| Years | Team | Gms | W | D | L | W% |
| 2012 | New Zealand Warriors | 2 | 0 | 0 | 2 | 0 |
Representative
| Years | Team | Gms | W | D | L | W% |
| 2017–22 | Cook Islands | 5 | 3 | 0 | 2 | 60 |
- Source: As of 14 October 2022
- Relatives: Kevin Iro (brother); Kayal Iro (nephew)

Tony Roy Iro (born 30 May 1967) is a professional rugby league coach and former rugby league footballer who last coached the Cook Islands national rugby league team. He is a former New Zealand international representative, playing on the wing or in the second row in 25 Tests.

== Background ==
Tony Iro is also the older brother of former professional rugby league international footballer Kevin Iro. He is the uncle of Kayal Iro.

== Playing career ==
Iro first played as a professional in England played with the Wigan Warriors from 1987 to 1989. During the 1988–89 season Iro played on the wing in Wigan's 22–17 victory over Salford in the 1988 Lancashire Cup Final at Knowsley Road, St. Helens on Sunday 23 October 1988.

He made his début for the Kiwis in the 1988 World Cup final against Australia. Playing on the wing, he scored a try on debut, but the Kiwis were defeated 25–12 in front of 47,363 at Auckland's Eden Park.

During the 1988–89 season Iro played on the wing in the 12–6 victory over Widnes Vikings in the 1988–89 John Player Special Trophy Final at Burnden Park, Bolton on Saturday 7 January 1989.

Iro moved to Australia in 1990 and played for the Manly-Warringah Sea Eagles.

In 1990-91 he returned to England for a short stint with Leigh.

He played at the 1995 Rugby League World Cup for the Kiwis, helping them to the semi-finals where they again went down to Australia in extra time.

He signed with new Super League club Hunter Mariners and after a season with his brother Kevin, ventured to play for the Adelaide Rams after moving to the forwards. Iro, who at the time played for the short-lived Adelaide Rams (1997–98), earlier in 1998 became the only Rams player selected for international duty when he played in the ANZAC Test against Australia at the North Harbour Stadium in Auckland. Iro's last international series was against Great Britain in England in late 1998 where he played from the bench in the first two tests of the series, both won by NZ. Following the demise of the Rams, 1999 found Iro at the South Sydney Rabbitohs before his return to England.

== Coaching career ==
In 2005 Iro joined the New Zealand Warriors coaching staff and in 2008 was named in inaugural coach of the Toyota Cup (Under-20s) team. He was appointed to the New Zealand coaching staff in February 2009.

For the 2010 season, Iro was promoted to be the Warriors Assistant Coach. In 2010 Iro was appointed a New Zealand national rugby league team selector for two years.

Following Brian McClennan's sacking on 21 August 2012, Iro was appointed the caretaker coach of the Warriors for the last two matches of the season. At the end of 2012 Iro left the club but rejoined for the 2015 season.

Since 2017, he has been the head coach of the Cook Islands national rugby league team.

== Achievements ==
- Wigan: Challenge Cup, Lancashire Cup, Regal Trophy, Charity Shield
