= Marty McKenzie (rugby league) =

Australian rugby league footballer

Personal information
- Full name: Marty McKenzie
- Born: 2 January 1972 (age 53); Dayboro, Queensland
- Height: 181 cm (5 ft 11 in)
- Weight: 100 kg (220 lb; 15 st 10 lb)

Playing information
- Position: Prop, Second-row
Club
Years	Team	Pld	T	G	FG	P
1993–96	Parramatta Eels	46	4	0	0	0
1997–98	Adelaide Rams	19	2	0	0	8
	Total	65	6	0	0	8
- Source: RLP

Marty McKenzie is an Australian former rugby league footballer who played professionally for the Parramatta Eels and Adelaide Rams.

== Playing career ==
McKenzie made his debut for the Parramatta Eels in 1994 and he went on to play three seasons for the club. In 1997, McKenzie joined the new Adelaide Rams franchise and was part of their inaugural match.

In 1999 McKenzie signed with the London Broncos however he suffered a back injury that required surgery and was sent home without having played a match. McKenzie was replaced at the Broncos by Anthony Seibold.
