= Kurt Wrigley =

Australian rugby league footballer & coach

Personal information
- Born: 13 September 1969 (age 56) Toowoomba, Queensland, Australia

Playing information
- Position: Fullback, Five-eighth
Club
| Years | Team | Pld | T | G | FG | P |
|---|---|---|---|---|---|---|
| 1992–94 | Cronulla Sharks | 21 | 3 | 3 | 0 | 18 |
| 1995 | St. George Dragons | 5 | 0 | 3 | 0 | 6 |
| 1997 | Adelaide Rams | 15 | 5 | 30 | 1 | 81 |
| | Total | 41 | 8 | 36 | 1 | 105 |

Kurt Wrigley (born 13 September 1969) is an Australian rugby league coach and former player. He played for the Cronulla-Sutherland Sharks, St. George Dragons and the Adelaide Rams and has also been an assistant coach at the South Sydney Rabbitohs and Newcastle Knights.

== Playing career ==
Wrigley made his first grade debut for Cronulla in round 2 of the 1992 NSWRL season against Illawarra at WIN Stadium. Wrigley played a total of 21 first grade games for Cronulla before he signed a contract to join rivals St. George. Wrigley only made five appearances for St. George in the 1995 ARL season. In 1997, Wrigley joined the newly admitted Adelaide side and played in their first ever game in round 1 against North Queensland at Dairy Farmers Stadium.

== Retirement ==
After his retirement at the end of 1997, Wrigley went on to become a qualified coach, serving as an assistant coach for the Adelaide Rams. He then moved to the Cronulla-Sutherland Sharks and worked in coaching and development, coaching the Matthew's Cup side to a premiership in 2000. Following that, he took a role as NRL Assistant Coach with St. George Illawarra Dragons from 2004 to 2008. He then spent a year as Chief Executive of Oztag Australia.

He worked as an NRL assistant coach with South Sydney Rabbitohs between 2010 and 2016. In 2015, he was named as the Queensland under-20s State of Origin coach.

In 2017, Wrigley joined the Newcastle Knights as an assistant coach, before leaving for other opportunities outside of rugby league in 2018. Wrigley is now a facilitator at Leading Teams.

== Career playing statistics ==
=== Point scoring summary ===
| Games | Tries | Goals | F/G | Points |
|---|---|---|---|---|
| 41 | 8 | 36 | 1 | 105 |

=== Matches played ===
| Team | Matches | Years |
|---|---|---|
| Cronulla-Sutherland Sharks | 21 | 1992–1994 |
| St. George Dragons | 5 | 1995 |
| Adelaide Rams | 15 | 1997 |
