= Rod Reddy =

Australian RL coach and former Australia international rugby league footballer

Personal information
- Full name: Rodney William Reddy
- Born: 1 March 1954 (age 72) Rockhampton, Queensland, Australia

Playing information
- Height: 6 ft 1 in (185 cm)
- Weight: 14 st 5 lb (91 kg)
- Position: Second-row, Lock
Club
Years	Team	Pld	T	G	FG	P
1972–83	St George	204	65	1	0	198
1984–85	Illawarra Steelers	33	1	0	0	4
1987–89	Barrow
	Total	237	66	1	0	202
Representative
Years	Team	Pld	T	G	FG	P
1973–80	New South Wales	13	3	0	0	9
1980	Queensland	1	0	0	0	0
1977–82	Australia	17	7	0	0	21

Coaching information
Club
Years	Team	Gms	W	D	L	W%
1988–89	Barrow Raiders	0	0	0	0
1997–98	Adelaide Rams	26	7	1	18	27
	Total	26	7	1	18	27
- Relatives: Liam Reddy (son); Bianca Reddy (daughter); Joel Reddy (son)

Rod Reddy (born 1 March 1954) is an Australian former professional rugby league footballer and coach. With the nickname ‘’’Rocket’’’ he played in the NSWRL Premiership for the St. George Dragons between 1972 and 1983 and the Illawarra Steelers between 1984 and 1985. He also represented Queensland in the State of Origin and the Australia national rugby league team. He coached the Adelaide Rams for their only two seasons.

== Playing career ==
Born in Rockhampton, Queensland, Reddy joined Sydney's St. George Dragons club in 1972 and stayed for 12 seasons. He was a member of premiership winning teams in 1977 and 1979. Reddy made the first of 17 representative appearances for Australia in 1977, and is listed on the Australian Players Register as Kangaroo No. 497. He was selected to go on the 1978 Kangaroo tour of Great Britain and France and in the first Test was named man-of-the-match. Reddy was selected to play for Queensland in the first State of Origin match played on 8 July 1980. He was one Australia's "Invincibles" in the 1982 Kangaroo tour of Great Britain and France. Reddy moved to the Illawarra Steelers in 1984 and played for one last season in 1985 before retiring.

== Coaching career ==
Rod Reddy took on a player-coach role at Barrow in 1987. Barrow earned promotion to Division One but that campaign saw Barrow manage only one league win and suffer a club record 90-0 defeat at Leeds. Reddy was sacked and Denis Jackson took over as a caretaker coach for the rest of 1989/90

After a successful coaching stint with Cumbria, Reddy took on the reserve grade coaching duties position Brian Smith at St George. He was appointed Smith’s successor as coach in 1996 but embraced the Super League concept and walked out on his former club before a match was played. After sitting out the 1996 season along with fellow St. George Super League loyalist Gorden Tallis while Super League successfully lodged its appeal, Reddy was the inaugural coach of the Adelaide Rams in 1997’s Super League season.

After a poor start to the 1998 season, Reddy and his coaching staff were sacked by the Rams' administration, and the club folded at the end of the year.

Reddy was the assistant coach at the Wests Tigers under head coach Jason Taylor but departed the club in 2015 being sacked by Jason Taylor in a cleanout. On 25 July 2019, Reddy labelled Wests player Robbie Farah the "Most selfish player I have ever been involved with while either playing the game or coaching bar none". Reddy went on to say "Well we were right he went to Souths and played reserve grade and that Wests Tigers team at the moment is a reserve grade team with 4/5 NRL players in it and Farah is not 1 of them". The comments came in the wake of Farah speaking about Reddy and Taylor to the media days earlier when Farah said "At the time I was told by him and 'Rocket' Reddy, I’d finish my career in reserve grade. But I’m here now – 'JT' is coaching reserve grade".

== Family ==
He is the father of Perth Glory football goalkeeper Liam Reddy, Adelaide Thunderbirds netball goalkeeper Bianca Reddy and South Sydney Rabbitohs rugby league back Joel Reddy.Kurt Reddy is the youngest of his four children.

== Accolades ==
Reddy was awarded Life Membership of the St. George Dragons in 1981. On 20 July 2022, Reddy was named in the St. George Dragons District Rugby League Clubs team of the century.
