= Bruce Mamando =

PNG international rugby league footballer

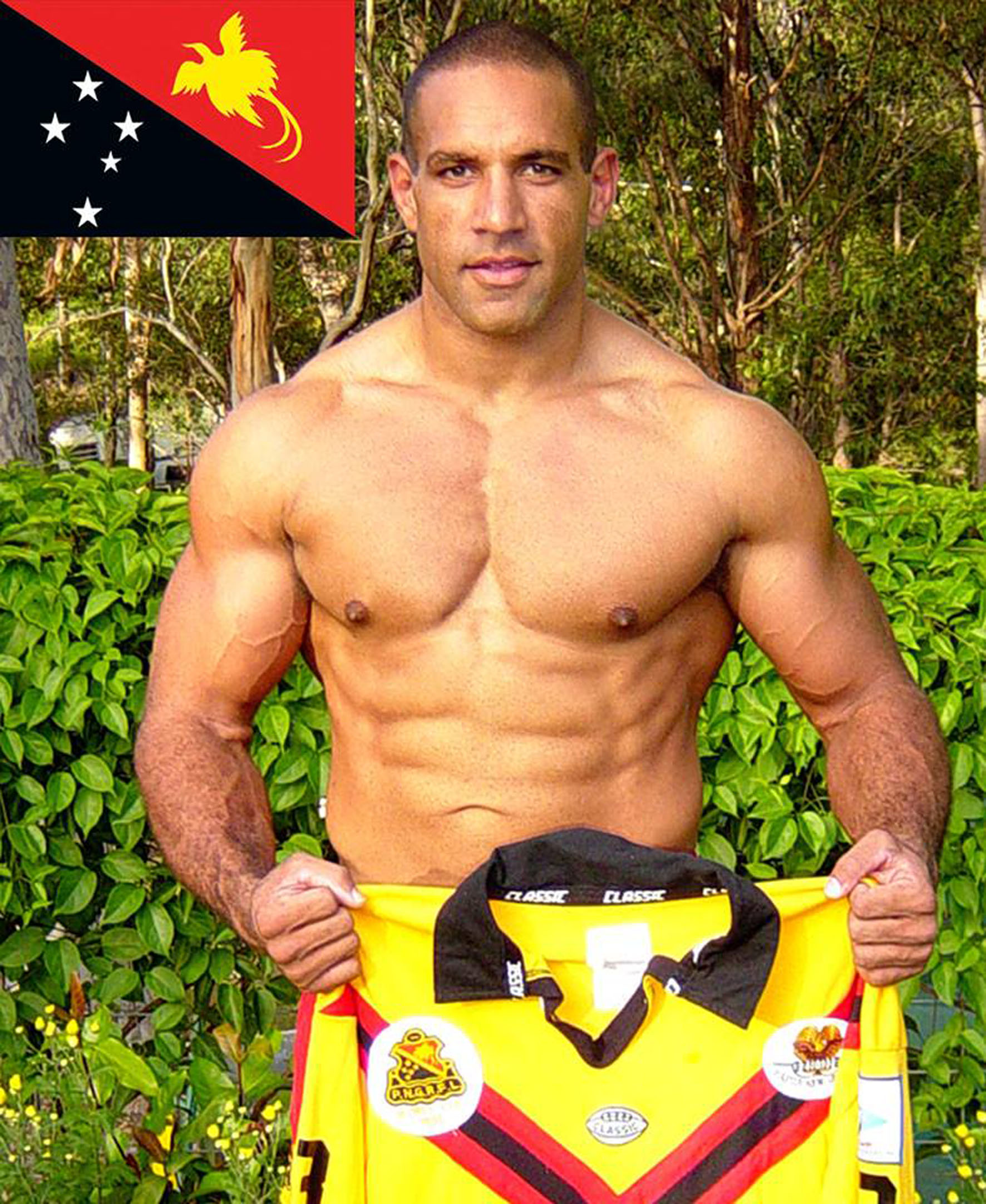

Personal information
- Born: 20 January 1974 (age 52) Mount Hagen, Papua New Guinea

Playing information
- Height: 189 cm (6 ft 2 in)
- Weight: 102 kg (16 st 1 lb)
- Position: Prop, Second-row, Lock
Club
Years	Team	Pld	T	G	FG	P
1994–96	Canberra Raiders	14	3	0	0	12
1997–98	Adelaide Rams	16	5	0	0	20
2000–01	North Qld Cowboys	2	0	0	0	0
	Total	32	8	0	0	32
Representative
Years	Team	Pld	T	G	FG	P
1995–00	Papua New Guinea	11	1	0	0	4

Bruce Mamando (born 20 January 1974) is a Papua New Guinean rugby league footballer who represented Papua New Guinea in the 1995 and 2000 World Cups.

== Background ==
Bruce Mamando was born in Mount Hagen, Papua New Guinea.

== Playing career ==
Mamando, who played at Prop and in the Second-row, made his debut for the Canberra Raiders from the bench during Round 2 of the 1994 NSWRL season, a 46-16 victory over the South Sydney Rabbitohs at Bruce Stadium in Canberra (his only first grade game of the season). He went on to play in fourteen matches for the Raiders over the next three seasons, scoring 3 tries, but struggled to cement a place in the Raiders forward pack which included Bradley Clyde, John Lomax, Quentin Pongia, Jason Croker and David Furner. In 1995 he was selected for the Papua New Guinea Kumuls squad for the 1995 Rugby League World Cup.

He then joined the new Adelaide Rams franchise in 1997 and was in their inaugural side for their match against the North Queensland Cowboys in Townsville on 1 March 1997 for the new Super League season. He spent two years at the ill-fated club, becoming a favorite with the Adelaide fans for his never say die attitude in a team mostly made up of some talented juniors and off-casts from other clubs. As a PNG test player, Mamando was one of the Rams few high-profile players, alongside team captain and former Australian test player and Brisbane Broncos premiership Hooker Kerrod Walters. He played 16 games for the Rams, scoring 5 tries.

In 1999, Mamando was a member of the Sydney Roosters squad for the 1999 season, but failed to make an appearance, due to niggling knee injuries.

In 2000 Mamando again represented Papua New Guinea at a World Cup. They went onto win there first 3 group stage matches against France, South Africa and Tonga before succumbing to Wales in the Quarterfinals, This was the first time in 20 years that the Kumuls had won 3 games in a row. Earlier that season he had joined North Queensland Cowboys. In 2001 he withdrew from the Papua New Guinea side, citing concerns over selection policies.
