= Adelaide Rams =

Defunct rugby league team in Adelaide, South Australia

Club information
- Full name: Adelaide Rugby League Football Club
- Nickname(s): Rams, Adelaide
- Colours: Primary: Blue; Red; Secondary: Yellow
- Founded: 13 December 1995; 30 years ago (first season: 1997)
- Exited: 1998; 28 years ago

Former details
- Ground: Adelaide Oval (1997–1998) Hindmarsh Stadium (1998) Ram Park, Oakden (training venue 1997–1998, now Adelaide City Park)
- CEO: Tim Pickup (1995–96); Liz Dawson (1996–98); Michael O'Connor (1999)
- Coach: Rod Reddy (1995–98); Dean Lance (1998)
- Captain: Kerrod Walters (1997–98)
- Competition: Super League and NRL
- 1997 1998: 9th of 10; 17th of 20

Uniforms
Home colours	Away colours

Records
- Most capped: 41 – Kerrod Walters
- Highest points scorer: 116 – Graham Appo

The Adelaide Rams were an Australian professional rugby league football club based in Adelaide, South Australia. The team was formed in 1995 for the planned rebel Super League competition. The Rams lasted two seasons, the first in the Super League competition in 1997 and the second in the first season of the National Rugby League (NRL) in 1998. The Rams were not a successful club, winning only 13 out of 42 games. However crowd numbers in the first season were the fifth highest of any first-grade club that year, but dwindled to sixteenth in the second season. The Adelaide club was shut down at the end of the 1998 season as a result of poor on-field performances, dwindling crowd numbers, financial losses and a reduction in the number of teams in the NRL. They remain the only team from the state of South Australia to have participated in top-level rugby league in Australia.

== History ==
=== Background ===
==== Australian rules football (later, Australian Football League [AFL]) ====
The Australian rules football code, with origins as far back as 1843, had long dominated sport in the state. South Australia had two teams competing in the national Australian rules competition, the Australian Football League (AFL): the Adelaide Crows and Port Adelaide, the latter starting in the AFL in the same year as the Rams first season in Super League. Port Adelaide's entry, propelled by a large local fan base in the South Australian National Football League (SANFL) competition, and the Crows successes in 1997–98 made it much harder for the Rams to compete for fan support. They were also competing against the popular Adelaide 36ers who played in the National Basketball League (NBL) which at the time ran a winter season. Adelaide, the capital of South Australia, was considered an Aussie rules stronghold, and in the SANFL had the oldest Aussie Rules Football league, and indeed the oldest league of any code, in Australia, as well as a viable Rugby Union competition which had been running since 1932. The South Australian Rugby League (SARL) also had a First Grade Premiership competition in place since 1976, while league been played competitively in Adelaide since the late 1940s.

==== NSWRL (later National Rugby League [NRL]) ====
The New South Wales Rugby League premiership (NSWRL) begun in 1908, as a rugby league competition mostly for clubs in the Sydney region of Australia (a team from Newcastle competed in 1908–09), a situation that lasted until 1982. The competition then expanded outside of NSW to Canberra, and to outside of Sydney with a team from Wollongong, and eventually in 1988 to Brisbane and the Gold Coast in Queensland, plus a new team from Newcastle. In 1992, the NSWRL decided to extend the competition further, by admitting four new teams for the 1995 competition, one from Western Australia, one from New Zealand and two from Queensland. The NSWRL also decided to test the viability of a rugby league team from the South Australian capital, and between 1991 and 1995 programmed five matches to be played in Adelaide at the famous Adelaide Oval. In 1991, the St. George Dragons (whose primary sponsor since the mid-late 1970s had been Adelaide-based winery Penfolds) and Balmain Tigers match attracted 28,884 people, at the time the largest attendance for any rugby league game in South Australia (since beaten when 48,613 attended Game 1 of the 2023 State of Origin series at the Adelaide Oval). The then record league crowd would prove to be the largest attendance of the entire minor round of the 1991 NSWRL season (it was in fact the 6th highest attendance for the entire season, beating the attendance of two of the seven Finals series games). Around 20,000 attended the two matches in 1992 and 1993, and around 10,000 in 1994 and 1995. Despite this evidence of popular appeal, the NSWRL, already in the process of setting up a 20-team competition, could not see their way to admitting a team from Adelaide and their preferred option outside of rugby league strongholds of NSW, Qld and New Zealand was to have a team from Melbourne and another in Perth (the Melbourne Storm would be formed in 1998). By the end of 1995, this was apparent as the ARL had already played two international Test matches involving the Australian Kangaroos in Melbourne, as well as three State of Origin games, with Game 2 of the 1994 State of Origin series attracting a then Australian record rugby league crowd of 87,161 to the Melbourne Cricket Ground.

=== Formation ===
In 1994, the media company News Limited began developing a rival competition to the long-established NSWRL premiership: the "Super League" premiership. In response to this move the Australian Rugby League (ARL), the governing body of rugby league in Australia, took over the NSWRL. After 8 of the 20 teams in the ARL competition signed with News Limited to play in the proposed Super League competition in 1996 the organization began looking for further teams to make the new competition viable. In June 1995 the South Australian Rugby League (SARL), which governs the game of rugby league in South Australia, officially signed with Super League, who subsequently gave it a licence to form a franchise which would allow the SARL to create a Super League team. Another leading factor in the SARL's decision to sign with SL was the promise of greater financial assistance than they were receiving from the ARL.

The team was owned and supported by News Limited. Former Australian representatives Tim Pickup and Rod Reddy were named inaugural CEO and head coach respectively.

On 13 December 1995, the SARL officially launched the 'Adelaide Rams', the tenth and final team to join the Super League competition (the 9th team was the Newcastle based Hunter Mariners). In early March 1996, the ARL were successful in gaining a federal court injunction, a legal ruling that prevented the Super League from beginning competition in 1996 and the Rams were put on hold causing Tim Pickup to stand down from his post in the ensuing months. In mid-1996, News Limited successfully appealed this ruling, which enabled the competition to proceed. Wallaby rugby union halfback George Gregan was approached to switch codes to be the starting halfback for the new team for "seriously more money than" he would earn playing rugby union, though he opted to remain in the 15-man code (Gregan would ultimately go on to win the 1999 Rugby World Cup with the Wallabies and would become Wallaby captain in 2001). The first, and only Super League season, was held in 1997, and the Rams team was part of it.

=== Inaugural season ===
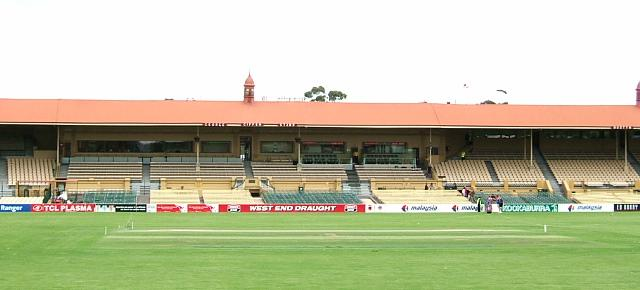
Adelaide Oval, original home ground of the Adelaide Rams

The SARL appointed the former Auckland Warriors marketing manager Liz Dawson as Pickup's replacement as the Rams' chief executive – the first female chief executive of any rugby league club in either the ARL or the Super League. The club had appointed St. George Dragons international back rower Rod Reddy to be their inaugural coach, along with two-time NSWRL premiership-winning and former Kangaroo tour Hooker Kerrod Walters from the Brisbane Broncos to be the first captain of the team. Most of the junior players were drawn from the SARL's lower grade competitions in Adelaide.

The club played its first premiership match on 1 March against the North Queensland Cowboys in Townsville and, after leading 16–4 at half time, eventually lost 24–16. This was also the first ever match of the Australian Super League's only season.

Their first home match, against fellow new team the Hunter Mariners in Round 3 on 14 March, was also the Rams' first win, and drew their record home attendance of 27,435 to the Adelaide Oval. This would actually turn out to be one of only two home wins for the season (not counting the 3 World Club Championship wins over visiting British teams Salford Red Devils, Leeds Rhinos and Oldham). The Rams also won four away games with their first being in Round 4 against the Auckland Warriors at the Ericsson Stadium in Auckland, New Zealand, but their overall record of 6 wins, 11 losses and 1 draw placed them second last on the Super League premiership ladder, one win ahead of North Queensland.

The Rams first home game attendance of 27,435 was the 4th highest attendance of the entire 1997 season, behind only the Grand Final at the ANZ Stadium in Brisbane (58,912), the opening game of the season in Brisbane (42,361) and a Round 6 match at the Dairy Farmers Stadium in Townsville (30,122).

Adelaide Rams 1997 Super League season results
Round	Home	Scoreline	Away	Date	Venue	Crowd
1	North Queensland Cowboys	24–16	Adelaide Rams	1 March	Dairy Farmers Stadium	17,738
2	Brisbane Broncos	28–12	Adelaide Rams	9 March	ANZ Stadium	16,279
3	Adelaide Rams	10–8	Hunter Mariners	14 March	Adelaide Oval	27,435
4	Auckland Warriors	12–16	Adelaide Rams	21 March	Ericsson Stadium	13,000
5	Adelaide Rams	16–18	Perth Reds	27 March	Adelaide Oval	16,294
6	Canterbury Bulldogs	34–22	Adelaide Rams	6 April	Belmore Sports Ground	7,234
7	Adelaide Rams	10–20	Brisbane Broncos	13 April	Adelaide Oval	17,633
8	Cronulla-Sutherland Sharks	18–29	Adelaide Rams	19 April	Shark Park	10,112
9	Penrith Panthers	16–22	Adelaide Rams	27 April	Penrith Football Stadium	5,815
10	Adelaide Rams	14–14	North Queensland Cowboys	2 May	Adelaide Oval	15,970
11	Adelaide Rams	22–42	Canterbury Bulldogs	23 May	Adelaide Oval	15,022
12	Adelaide Rams	18–34	Canberra Raiders	1 June	Adelaide Oval	13,894
13	Perth Reds	4–28	Adelaide Rams	29 June	W.A.C.A	7,204
14	Hunter Mariners	10–2	Adelaide Rams	5 July	Topper Stadium	2,345
15	Adelaide Rams	8–18	Auckland Warriors	11 July	Adelaide Oval	13,278
16	Adelaide Rams	6–28	Cronulla-Sutherland Sharks	8 August	Adelaide Oval	7,231
17	Canberra Raiders	58–16	Adelaide Rams	17 August	Canberra Stadium	7,960
18	Adelaide Rams	36–16	Penrith Panthers	22 August	Adelaide Oval	11,211

Former Cronulla Sharks goal kicking utility back Kurt Wrigley was the Rams top point scorer for the season with 81 points from 5 tries, 30 goals and 1 field goal. Wrigley, and former South Sydney Rabbitohs and St George Dragons fullback Rod Maybon, were the team's top try scorers with 5 each. Super League's top point scorer for the season was Penrith Panthers centre Ryan Girdler who scored 197 points from 11 tries, 76 goals and 1 field goal while the competition's top try scorer was Canterbury Bulldogs utility back Matthew Ryan who crossed for 17 tries.

Following the unification of the Super League and ARL competitions after the 1997 season, a new National Rugby League (NRL) competition was formed. This meant that three teams would be demised, as part of the rationalisation process aimed at reducing teams to an optimal number. With the introduction of the Melbourne Storm (who despite being owned by New Ltd. were not actually a Super League team despite popular belief), and an agreement between Super League and the ARL to have a competition limited to 14 teams by 2000, the future for the Rams looked bleak. However, the Rams' home ground support, which averaged 15,330 fans each week, the 4th highest out of 22 teams across both the SL and ARL competitions, ensured that they remained in the unified 1998 competition.

==== World Club Championship ====
In addition to the Telstra Cup, the Adelaide Rams also competed in Super League's 1997 World Club Championship competition. The Rams were placed in Australasia Pool B along with the Hunter Mariners, North Queensland Cowboys and Perth Reds and would be matched up against teams from Europe Pool B including the Leeds Rhinos, Oldham Bears and Salford City Reds. The competition would see the Rams play three games at home and three in England.

The Rams won their three home games rather easily including a surprise 34–8 win over glamour side Leeds, but only managed to win one of their games in England against Oldham leaving them in third place in their pool. As only one team from Australasia Pool B would go on to the Quarter finals, this meant that the Adelaide Rams did not advance past the group stage of the tournament.

Adelaide Rams 1997 World Club Championship results
Round	Home	Scoreline	Away	Date	Venue	Crowd
1	Adelaide Rams	50–16	Salford City Reds	8 June	Adelaide Oval	11,009
2	Adelaide Rams	34–8	Leeds Rhinos	13 June	Adelaide Oval	14,360
3	Adelaide Rams	42–14	Oldham Bears	20 June	Adelaide Oval	13,852
4	Leeds Rhinos	22–14	Adelaide Rams	18 July	Headingley	11,269
5	Oldham Bears	2–18	Adelaide Rams	25 July	Boundary Park	3,513
6	Salford City Reds	14–12	Adelaide Rams	3 August	The Willows	6,995

=== Final season ===
The demise of three clubs from the Super League and ARL (Western Reds and Hunter Mariners (SL), and South Queensland Crushers (ARL)) saw some player re-shuffling (which saw 1997 Queensland representative Kevin Campion sensationally cut from the club after being told he was not in Rod Reddy's plans for the team), and brought New South Wales halfback Noel Goldthorpe, speedy winger Matt Daylight, and New Zealand national rugby league team test veteran back rower Tony Iro to the Adelaide club. However, after the Rams lost nine of their first ten games, coach Reddy and the entire coaching staff were sacked by the Rams' administration. Reddy was replaced by former Perth Reds coach Dean Lance and mid-season saw the arrival of goal kicking Canberra Raiders utility back Graham Appo.

In June after numerous financial disagreements with the South Australian Cricket Association (SACA) who at the time owned the Adelaide Oval, the club changed home grounds to the smaller, 16,500 capacity Hindmarsh Stadium, a soccer specific venue which was better suited to a rugby league field than the Adelaide Oval was. The Rams celebrated the move with a record 52–0 win over the Balmain Tigers.

The club went on to win six of their last fourteen games after Lance's arrival, enough to avoid the wooden spoon awarded to the team finishing lowest on the competition ladder. Their overall results were comparable to those of their first season, coming fourth last in the 20–team competition. Appo broke several team records in his 14 games with the Rams.

The Adelaide Rams last home game in the penultimate round of the season saw a 36–0 thrashing at the hands of the finals bound North Sydney Bears in front of 7,035 fans on 15 August 1998.

Throughout the 1998 season, the Rams attempted to build a stronger supporter base in order to avoid removal from the competition in 1999 or 2000. However, with the team's lack of on-field success, plus the success of other Adelaide-based sports teams who won national premierships/championships in 1997 and/or 1998 including the Adelaide Crows (AFL), Adelaide 36ers (NBL), Adelaide Lightning (WNBL) and Adelaide Thunderbirds (netball), saw average home attendances dropped by more than half (51.3%) from the previous years 15,330 to just 7,472 over the course of the season.

Adelaide Rams 1998 NRL season results
Round	Home	Scoreline	Away	Date	Venue	Crowd
1	Adelaide Rams	8–18	North Queensland Cowboys	13 March	Adelaide Oval	11,289
2	Manly-Warringah Sea Eagles	22–6	Adelaide Rams	22 March	Brookvale Oval	6,434
3	Adelaide Rams	22–20	Canterbury Bulldogs	27 March	Adelaide Oval	8,390
4	Penrith Panthers	54–12	Adelaide Rams	5 April	Penrith Football Stadium	6,637
5	Adelaide Rams	8–16	Gold Coast Chargers	9 April	Adelaide Oval	7,058
6	Sydney City Roosters	50–12	Adelaide Rams	17 April	Sydney Football Stadium	6,200
7	Adelaide Rams	12–22	Cronulla-Sutherland Sharks	25 April	Adelaide Oval	8,472
8	Canterbury Bulldogs	30–4	Adelaide Rams	3 May	Belmore Sports Ground	5,041
9	Adelaide Rams	18–24	Canberra Raiders	8 May	Adelaide Oval	6,500
10	Parramatta Eels	18–2	Adelaide Rams	16 May	Pioneer Oval	7,514
11	Adelaide Rams	35–18	Penrith Panthers	23 May	Adelaide Oval	5,000
12	Western Suburbs Magpies	36–24	Adelaide Rams	31 May	Campbelltown Stadium	6,392
13	Adelaide Rams	22–20	St. George Dragons	6 June	Adelaide Oval	8,506
14	Melbourne Storm	24–4	Adelaide Rams	13 June	Olympic Park	8,293
15	Adelaide Rams	4–39	Illawarra Steelers	20 June	Bennett Oval	5,153
16	Gold Coast Chargers	12–40	Adelaide Rams	27 June	Carrara Stadium	3,897
17	Adelaide Rams	52–0	Balmain Tigers	3 July	Hindmarsh Stadium	7,351
18	South Sydney Rabbitohs	18–34	Adelaide Rams	12 July	Sydney Football Stadium	4,060
19	North Queensland Cowboys	14–10	Adelaide Rams	18 July	Dairy Farmers Stadium	11,340
20	Adelaide Rams	22–20	Auckland Warriors	26 July	Hindmarsh Stadium	7,445
21	Brisbane Broncos	46–12	Adelaide Rams	1 August	ANZ Stadium	13,858
22	Adelaide Rams	10–32	Manly-Warringah Sea Eagles	7 August	Hindmarsh Stadium	7,459
23	Adelaide Rams	0–36	North Sydney Bears	15 August	Hindmarsh Stadium	7,035
24	Newcastle Knights	34–20	Adelaide Rams	22 August	Marathon Stadium	17,281

The NRL had planned to continue a 20–team competition in 1999, with a reduction to 14 teams in 2000. The Rams' management, led by newly named CEO, former dual rugby international and Manly-Warringah 1987 premiership player Michael O'Connor, had their minds set on a place in the reduced competition, and went on a buying spree, obtaining rights for players that they hoped would be productive enough for the team to survive the cut in 2000. However, after the merger between rugby league clubs St. George Dragons and Illawarra Steelers which reduced the number of teams to 19, it was decided to avoid a bye that another team needed to be dropped from the competition. As the league's desire was to keep a team in Melbourne it was decided by the NRL to cut the Rams and owners News Limited then told the club they would no longer receive funding and the club was wound up just days after it had held its 1999 season launch. With little chance of securing a contract with another club just weeks before the start of the 1999 NRL season, the players were then placed in other News Ltd. owned or financed teams including Brisbane, Canberra and Melbourne.

The cost of building and sustaining an uncompetitive rugby league team in an area dominated by another football sport had resulted in News Limited incurring heavy financial losses with the Rams. Subsequent attempts to merge with a Sydney club (rumoured to be the ARL loyal South Sydney Rabbitohs) failed, however the Canberra Raiders offered to merge with the club and effectively took over the club on 1 December 1998.

You cannot expect the Rams to have won over South Australians after just two seasons in such an Aussie Rules stronghold, especially given the extraordinary nature of those seasons.

— South Australian Opposition Leader, Mike Rann, 1998

=== Future ===
While the Adelaide Rams no longer exist in their own right, numbers in junior rugby league in Adelaide have risen, and the SARL has begun again to promote the idea of a team based in Adelaide. Due to its efforts, NRL teams have been brought to the city to revive interest; in 2006, the Penrith Panthers scheduled a home game at Adelaide's Hindmarsh Stadium while their home ground was under renovation. The NRL helped with the promotion of the match, although the SARL were disappointed with the small crowd of 7,017. In 2008, Sydney based club the Cronulla Sharks announced they would play three matches over the next three years at Adelaide, with coach Ricky Stuart saying he wanted Adelaide to become the Sharks' second home. SARL general manager Bruce Walker has suggested that the NRL itself should take more responsibility for scheduling games in Adelaide. The 2009 match against North Queensland Cowboys attracted 8,547 people. However, at the end of the 2008 NRL season, the league's Centenary year, the Sharks decided to concentrate on their home fans and were allowed out of their contract to play in Adelaide after just one game.

In 2010, the Canterbury-Bankstown Bulldogs took their home match against the Melbourne Storm to Adelaide in which Canterbury-Bankstown Bulldogs defeating the Melbourne Storm 20–18 where the game attracted 10,350 people at Adelaide Oval.

In 2008, several NRL club bosses expressed the view that the NRL should be a "national" competition, since it now had teams from all around Australia rather than just on the eastern seaboard, arguing that such a move would increase the competition's revenue. Peter Parr, the CEO of the North Queensland Cowboys and former assistant coach for the Rams in 1998, said that if the NRL had stuck with the Adelaide Rams, then rugby league in Adelaide might have flourished, making comparisons with the Melbourne Storm, a team performing successfully on and off the field in the AFL's heartland.

Early in the 2013 NRL season, the NRL's official free-to-air broadcast partner the Nine Network, began to show their Friday night and Sunday afternoon games live around Australia, including Adelaide, on their digital channel GEM.

== Colours, emblem and stadium ==
The emblem of the team was a ram (a male sheep). The ram was chosen, according to Super League chief executive John Ribot, because it was "readily identifiable with strength and hardness". This name was considered a better alternative to the first choice, the Adelaide Aces (through a proposed sponsorship link with the Adelaide Casino), which Ribot believed was too soft a name and did not work well as a brand for a Super League team. The main colours of the Adelaide Rams were red and blue, although there was yellow in their emblem to reflect South Australia's traditional sporting colours. Their jerseys remained red and blue until the last game they played in 1998, when they used a mainly yellow jersey to avoid a colour clash with the similar jerseys of the Newcastle Knights (who were the home team).

The Rams' initial home ground was Adelaide Oval, a round park that had been used for cricket and Australian Rules Football for over a century. For their first season they had average home attendances of 15,330, the fourth highest of the Super League teams and fifth highest of all 22 teams in both competitions. In 1998, however, the Rams' home attendances diminished, dropping to an average of about 7,500, the fourth lowest of any team in the 20–team competition.

During 1998, the South Australian Cricket Association had ongoing problems with the SARL and the Rams' use of their stadium, Adelaide Oval. The Rams then moved to Hindmarsh Stadium, a rectangular stadium more suited to rugby league and owned by the South Australian Soccer Association. They celebrated with a 52–0 defeat over Balmain in their first match at the stadium. However, attendances did not improve after the move, falling below 7,500.

The Rams highest attendance at Adelaide Oval was 27,435 set in their inaugural home game against the Hunter Mariners. Their record attendance at Hindmarsh was 7,459 for their loss to 1997 ARL Grand Finalists, the Manly-Warringah Sea Eagles. In 1998, the Rams played their Round 15 home game against the Illawarra Steelers at the Bennett Oval in Whyalla, in part due to Whyalla's main employer being BHP who were also the Steelers major sponsor. The Steelers won the game 39–4 in front of 5,153 fans.

== Records and statistics ==
=== Most games for club ===
- 41, Kerrod Walters (1997–1998)
- 36, Mark Corvo (1997–1998)
- 35, Dean Schifilliti (1997–1998)

=== Most points for club ===
- 116, (12 tries, 34 goals), Graham Appo (1998)
- 114, (6 tries, 45 goals), Luke Williamson (1997–1998)
- 81, (5 tries, 30 goals), Kurt Wrigley (1997)

=== Most tries for club ===
- 12, Graham Appo (1998)
- 8, Rod Jensen (1998)
- 7, Matt Daylight (1998)

=== Most goals for club ===
- 45, (45/69–65.22%), Luke Williamson (1997–1998)
- 34, (34/52–65.38%), Graham Appo (1998)
- 30, (30/37–81.08%), Kurt Wrigley (1997)

=== Most points in a season ===
- 116, (12 tries, 34 goals), Graham Appo in 1998
- 81, (5 tries, 30 goals), Kurt Wrigley in 1997
- 70, (3 tries, 29 goals), Luke Williamson in 1997

=== Most tries in a season ===
- 12, Graham Appo in 1998
- 8, Rod Jensen in 1998
- 7, Matt Daylight in 1998

=== Most goals in a season ===
- 34 (34/52–65.38%), Graham Appo in 1998
- 30 (30/37–81.08%), Kurt Wrigley 1997
- 29 (29/37–78.38%), Luke Williamson in 1997

=== Most points in a match ===
- 24 (3 tries, 6 goals), Graham Appo vs Gold Coast Chargers on 27 June 1998 @ Carrara Stadium
- 24 (2 tries, 8 goals), Graham Appo vs Balmain Tigers on 3 July 1998 @ Hindmarsh Stadium
- 18 (2 tries, 5 goals), Graham Appo vs Penrith Panthers on 23 May 1998 @ Adelaide Oval

=== Most tries in a match ===
- 3, Graham Appo against Gold Coast Chargers on 27 June 1998
- 2, 17 players

=== Most goals in a match ===
- 8, (8/9–88.9%), Graham Appo vs Balmain Tigers on 3 July 1998 @ Hindmarsh Stadium
- 6, (6/6–100%), Luke Williamson vs Cronulla-Sutherland Sharks on 19 April 1997 Shark Park
- 6, (6/7–85.7%), Kurt Wrigley vs Penrith Panthers on 22 August 1997 @ Adelaide Oval
- 6, (6/7–85.7%), Graham Appo vs Gold Coast Chargers on 27 June 1998 @ Carrara Stadium

=== Highest attendance (home) ===
- Adelaide Oval: 27,435 vs Hunter Mariners on 14 March 1997
- Hindmarsh Stadium: 7,459 vs Manly-Warringah Sea Eagles on 7 August 1998

=== Highest attendance (away) ===
- Stockland Stadium (Townsville): 17,738 vs North Queensland Cowboys on 1 March 1997

=== Lowest attendance (home) ===
- Adelaide Oval: 6,500 vs Canberra Raiders on 8 May 1998
- Hindmarsh Stadium: 7,035 vs North Sydney Bears on 15 August 1998

=== Lowest attendance (away) ===
- Topper Stadium (Newcastle): 2,345 vs Hunter Mariners on 5 July 1997

== Club records ==
Adelaide Rams
Effective 3 April 2014
Biggest Win	52–0 vs Balmain Tigers (1998)
Biggest Loss	16–58 vs Canberra Raiders (1997)
	12–54 vs Penrith Panthers (1998)
Consecutive Wins	3 – (1998)
Consecutive Losses	7 – (1998)
Clubs (Most Wins Against)	Auckland Warriors – 3
Clubs (Most Losses To)	Cronulla Sharks – 3
Adelaide Oval Record	Played 16 – (W) 5 / (L) 10 / (D) 1
Hindmarsh Stadium Record	Played 4 – (W) 2 / (L) 2 / (D) 0
First Representative Player	Kevin Campion – Queensland, Super League Tri-series
First International Representative	Tony Iro – New Zealand vs Australia, 1998 Anzac Test

=== Biggest wins ===
Margin	Score	Opposition	Venue	Date
52	52–0	Balmain Tigers	Hindmarsh Stadium	3 July 1998
28	40–12	Gold Coast Chargers	Carrara Stadium	27 June 1998
24	28–4	Western Reds	WACA	29 June 1997

=== Biggest losses ===
Margin	Score	Opposition	Venue	Date
42	16–58	Canberra Raiders	Bruce Stadium	17 August 1997
42	12–54	Penrith Panthers	Penrith Football Stadium	5 April 1998
38	12–50	Sydney City Roosters	Sydney Football Stadium	17 April 1998

=== Team performance summary ===
The Rams did not win any premierships, minor premierships or wooden spoons in their two seasons. Their biggest win was 52–0 over the Balmain Tigers in 1998 and their biggest losing margin was 42 points, which occurred twice: against the Canberra Raiders in 1997 and the Penrith Panthers in 1998. The Rams had a 32.14% win percentage for all of their premiership games, which made them statistically the sixth worst team in first grade rugby league in Australia, out of 33 teams.

Of the Rams 13 wins, 7 of them were at home while 5 were away. The Rams final win came in Round 20 of the 1998 NRL season when they defeated the Auckland Warriors 22–20 at Hindmarsh Stadium in front of 7,445 fans. The club's final ever home game in Round 23 of 1998 saw them go down 36–0 to the North Sydney Bears in front of 7,035 fans, the lowest recorded attendance at Hindmarsh.

== Players ==
=== Inaugural team ===
North Queensland Cowboys 24 def. Adelaide Rams 16
Date: 1 March 1997
Venue: Stockland Stadium (Townsville)
Attendance: 17,738
Referee: Brian Grant

No.

Position
Player

3 Michael Maguire – FB 22 Wayne Simonds – WG 25 Solomon Kiri – CE 4 Elias Paiyo – CE 44 Joe Tamani – WG 33 Kurt Wrigley – FE 7 Stuart Topper – HB 11 Andrew Hick – PR 27 Kerrod Walters (c) – HK

No.

Position
Player

10 Marty McKenzie – PR 13 Dave Boughton – SR 12 Brett Galea – SR 8 Cameron Blair – LK 36 Kevin Campion – positions 6 Chris Quinn – positions 9 Steve Stone – positions 17 Bruce Mamando – positions CO Rod Reddy – positions
