= 1995 Rugby League World Cup squads =

The 1995 Rugby League World Cup squads were made up of players from the national rugby league football teams of ten countries: Australia, England, Fiji, France, New Zealand, Papua New Guinea, South Africa, Tonga, Wales and Western Samoa.

All teams were permitted to name a squad of up to 25 players, and were allowed to call-up replacements during the tournament in the event of illness or injury.

== Australia ==
Due to the Super League war, the Australian Rugby League did not select any player who had signed with Super League. As 100% of Australia's squad was sourced from Australian Rugby League-aligned players, several test players from the successful 1994 Kangaroo Tour were not selected for the World Cup, though a number of the team had played in the 3-0 Trans-Tasman Test series win over New Zealand earlier in the year.

Super League aligned Canberra Raiders players, including Laurie Daley, Ricky Stuart took the ARL to court during 1995 in a bid to be able to play in the World Cup. The court found in their favour and ordered the ARL to consider all players for selection regardless of who they were aligned to. However, as one unnamed ARL official was quoted as saying, the ARL were only forced to consider Super League players, not select them. Just how many, if any, Super League players were considered for selection remains unknown and speculation remains that behind closed doors no Super League player was considered.

- Coach: (Australia) Bob Fulton
- Manager: Geoff Carr

Player	Games	Tries	Goals	Field Goals	Points	Position	Club
Wayne Bartrim	2	-	-	-	-	HK / LK	(Australia) St. George Dragons
Tim Brasher	5	4	-	-	16	FB / CE	(Australia) Sydney Tigers
Mark Carroll	5	–	–	–	–	PR	(Australia) Manly Warringah Sea Eagles
Mark Coyne	4	2	–	–	8	CE	(Australia) St. George Dragons
Brett Dallas	4	3	–	–	12	WG	(Australia) Sydney Bulldogs
Jim Dymock	5	1	–	–	4	LK / FE	(Australia) Sydney Bulldogs
Brad Fittler (c)	4	1	–	–	4	FE / LK	(Australia) Penrith Panthers
David Gillespie	1	–	–	–	–	PR	(Australia) Manly Warringah Sea Eagles
Paul Harragon*	2	–	–	–	–	PR	(Australia) Newcastle Knights
Terry Hill	4	3	–	–	12	CE	(Australia) Manly Warringah Sea Eagles
John Hopoate	2	3	–	–	12	WG	(Australia) Manly Warringah Sea Eagles
Andrew Johns	4	2	27	–	62	HB / HK	(Australia) Newcastle Knights
Matthew Johns	4	–	–	–	–	FE	(Australia) Newcastle Knights
Nik Kosef	3	1	–	–	4	LK	(Australia) Manly Warringah Sea Eagles
Gary Larson*	3	1	–	–	4	SR / PR	(Australia) North Sydney Bears
Paul McGregor	2	2	–	–	8	CE	(Australia) Illawarra Steelers
Steve Menzies	4	6	–	–	24	SR	(Australia) Manly Warringah Sea Eagles
Billy Moore	1	–	–	–	–	LK / SR	(Australia) North Sydney Bears
Danny Moore	1	2	–	–	8	CE	(Australia) Manly Warringah Sea Eagles
Adam Muir	1	–	–	–	–	SR	(Australia) Newcastle Knights
Robbie O'Davis	3	5	–	–	20	FB / WG	(Australia) Newcastle Knights
Dean Pay	4	–	–	–	–	PR / SR	(Australia) Sydney Bulldogs
Aaron Raper	1	1	–	–	4	HK	(Australia) Cronulla-Sutherland Sharks
Jason Smith	5	1	–	–	4	LK / SR	(Australia) Sydney Bulldogs
Geoff Toovey	4	–	–	–	–	HB	(Australia) Manly Warringah Sea Eagles
Rod Wishart	3	1	2	–	8	WG	(Australia) Illawarra Steelers

*Gary Larson originally declined selection citing personal reasons. When Paul Harragon was injured he answered Bob Fulton's call to join the squad and ended up playing in the final at Wembley.

== England ==
Long time Wigan, Great Britain and England back rower Denis Betts, playing for the Auckland Warriors in the Australian Rugby League premiership, made history by becoming the first player selected to captain England while not playing for a British club.

- Coach: (England) Phil Larder
- Manager: Phil Lowe

Player	Games	Tries	Goals	Field Goals	Points	Position	Club
John Bentley	3	1	–	–	4	WG	(England) Halifax Blue Sox
Denis Betts (c)	4	1	–	–	4	SR	(New Zealand) Auckland Warriors
Paul Broadbent	2	2	–	–	8	PR	(England) Sheffield Eagles
Mick Cassidy	4	–	–	–	–	SR	(England) Wigan Warriors
Phil Clarke	4	–	–	–	–	LF / SR	(Australia) Sydney City Roosters
Gary Connolly	1	–	–	–	–	CE / FB	(England) Wigan Warriors
Paul Cook	2	–	–	–	–	FB / WG	(England) Leeds Rhinos
Shaun Edwards	1	–	–	–	–	SH	(England) Wigan Warriors
Andy Farrell	4	2	7	–	22	LF	(England) Wigan Warriors
Bobbie Goulding	4	1	13	1	31	SH	(England) St Helens
Karl Harrison	4	–	–	–	–	PR	(England) Halifax Blue Sox
Simon Haughton	4	2	–	–	8	SR	(England) Wigan Warriors
Lee Jackson	4	–	–	–	–	HK	(England) Sheffield Eagles
Chris Joynt	3	1	–	–	4	SR	(England) St Helens
Barrie-Jon Mather	2	–	–	–	–	CE	(England) Wigan Warriors
Steve McCurrie	1	–	–	–	–	LF / SR	(England) Widnes Vikings
Paul Newlove	4	4	–	–	16	CE	(England) Bradford Bulls
Martin Offiah	3	2	–	–	8	WG	(England) Wigan Warriors
Nick Pinkney	3	2	–	–	8	CE	(England) Keighley Cougars
Andy Platt	4	–	–	–	–	PR	(New Zealand) Auckland Warriors / (England) Widnes Vikings
Daryl Powell	2	–	–	–	–	SO	(England) Keighley Cougars
Kris Radlinski	5	2	–	–	8	FB	(England) Wigan Warriors
Jason Robinson	4	3	–	–	12	WG	(England) Wigan Warriors
Dean Sampson	3	1	–	–	4	PR	(England) Castleford Tigers
Tony Smith	4	2	–	–	8	SO	(England) Castleford Tigers

== Fiji ==
Incumbent captain James Pickering was unavailable, having suffered a broken leg earlier in the year.

- Coach: (Australia) Graham Murray
- Manager: Epell Lagiloaloa

Player	Games	Tries	Goals	Field Goals	Points	Position	Club
Orisi Cavuilati	1	–	–	–	–	WG	(Australia) Sydney Bulldogs
Josaia Dakuitoga	3	1	–	–	4	WG	(Australia) Penrith Panthers
Samuela Davetawalu	1	–	–	–	–	SR	(Fiji) Nadi Dragons
Apisalome Degei	2	–	–	–	–	SR	(Australia) Parramatta Eels
Malakai Kaunaivalu	3	–	–	–	–	PR	(Fiji) Lautoka
Kiniviliame Koroibuleka	1	–	–	–	–		(Fiji) Army Bears
Niumaia Korovata	2	–	–	–	–	LK	
Samuela Marayawa	2	1	–	–	4	LK	(Australia) Tumbarumba
Noa Nadruku	3	1	–	–	4	WG	(Australia) Canberra Raiders
Kaleveti Naisoro	3	1	–	–	4	WG / HB	(Australia) Parramatta Eels
Pio Nakubuwai	3	–	–	–	–	PR	(Australia) Yanco-Wamoon Hawks
Livai Nalagilagi (c)	3	–	–	–	–	CE	(Australia) Penrith Panthers
Noa Nayacakalou	3	–	3	–	6	FE	(Australia) Penrith Panthers
Inoke Ratudina	–	–	–	–	–	FE	(Fiji) Nadera Panthers
Freddie Robarts	–	–	–	–	–	HK	(New Zealand) Waitakere City Raiders
Ian Sagaitu	3	1	–	–	4	HK	
Kaiava Salusalu	1	–	–	–	–	PR	(Fiji) Lautoka
Fili Seru	3	2	–	–	8	WG / CE	(Australia) South Queensland Crushers
Waisale Sovatabua	3	2	–	–	8	FB	(Australia) Newcastle Knights
Savenaca Taga	3	1	3	–	10	HB	(Fiji) Nadi Dragons
Illiesa Toga	2	–	–	–	–	SR	
Ponipate Toga	–	–	–	–	–		(Fiji) Nadi Dragons
Jioji Vatubua	3	–	–	–	–	CE	(Fiji) Lautoka
Waisale Vatubua	1	–	–	–	–	WG	
Ulaiasi Wainidroa	2	–	–	–	–	SR	(Fiji) Nadi Dragons

== France ==
- Coach: (France) Ivan Grésèque
- Manager: Tas Baitieri

Player	Games	Tries	Goals	Field Goals	Points	Position	Club
Patrick Acroue	–	–	–	–	–	SR	(France) SO Avignon
Vincent Banet	1	–	–	–	–	SH	(France) Limoux Grizzlies
Frédéric Banquet	2	–	2	–	4	CE / WG	(England) Sheffield Eagles
Cyril Baudouin	1	–	–	–	–	SR	(France) Carpentras XIII
Hadji Boudebza	1	–	–	–	–	PR	(France) AS Saint Estève
Didier Cabestany	2	1	–	–	4	SR	(France) XIII Catalan
Pierre Chamorin	2	1	–	–	4	CE / SO	(France) AS Saint Estève
Brian Coles	2	–	–	–	–	WG	(France) XIII Catalan
David Despin	1	–	–	–	–	CE / SO	(France) Villeneuve XIII RLLG
Patrick Entat (c)	2	–	–	–	–	SH	(France) SO Avignon
Pascal Fages	2	–	–	–	–	CE / SO	(France) Pia Donkeys
David Fraisse	1	–	–	–	–	CE	(England) Workington Town
Jean-Marc Garcia	2	–	–	–	–	WG / CE	(France) AS Saint Estève
Lilian Hébert	1	–	–	–	–	PR	(France) Pia Donkeys
Karl Jaavuo	2	–	–	–	–	PR	(France) Pia Donkeys
Pascal Jampy	2	–	–	–	–	SR	(France) AS Saint Estève
Stéphane Millet (Note: Stéphane Millet (France), Pierre Grobbelaar (South Africa), and Syd Eru (New Zealand) were all suspended from the tournament after failing drug tests.)	–	–	–	–	–	FB	(France) Saint-Gaudens
Pascal Mons	1	–	–	–	–	WG / CE	(France) AS Carcassonne
Gael Tallec	1	–	–	–	–	SR	(England) Wigan Warriors
Frederic Teixido	2	–	–	–	–	PR	(France) Limoux Grizzlies
Marc Tisseyre	1	–	–	–	–	PR	(France) Limoux Grizzlies
Patrick Torreilles	2	1	–	–	4	HK	(France) Pia Donkeys
Thierry Valero	2	–	–	–	–	HK / LF	(France) Lézignan Sangliers

== New Zealand ==
- Coach: (New Zealand) Frank Endacott
- Manager: Bevn Olsen

Player	Games	Tries	Goals	Field Goals	Points	Position	Club
Richie Barnett	2	1	–	–	4	WG	(Australia) Cronulla-Sutherland Sharks
Richie Blackmore	3	3	–	–	12	CE	(New Zealand) Auckland Warriors
Syd Eru	1	–	–	–	–	HK	(New Zealand) Auckland Warriors
Gary Freeman	1	–	–	–	–	HB / HK	(Australia) Penrith Panthers
Daryl Halligan	–	–	–	–	–	WG	(Australia) Sydney Bulldogs
Sean Hoppe	3	2	–	–	8	WG	(New Zealand) Auckland Warriors
Mark Horo	3	–	–	–	–	SR	(Australia) Western Suburbs Magpies
Kevin Iro	3	1	–	–	4	CE	(England) Leeds Rhinos
Tony Iro	3	1	–	–	4	SR	(Australia) Sydney City Roosters
Stacey Jones	3	–	–	–	–	HB	(New Zealand) Auckland Warriors
Stephen Kearney	3	–	–	–	–	SR	(New Zealand) Auckland Warriors
Tony Kemp	3	1	–	–	4	FE / LK	(England) Leeds Rhinos
John Lomax	1	–	–	–	–	PR	(Australia) Canberra Raiders
Jason Lowrie	3	–	–	–	–	PR	(Australia) Sydney City Roosters
Gene Ngamu	3	–	1	–	2	FB / FE	(New Zealand) Auckland Warriors
Hitro Okesene	3	1	–	–	4	PR	(New Zealand) Auckland Warriors
Henry Paul	3	–	–	–	–	FE / FB	(England) Wigan Warriors
Quentin Pongia	3	–	–	–	–	PR / SR	(Australia) Canberra Raiders
Matthew Ridge (c)	3	1	10	1	25	FB	(Australia) Manly Warringah Sea Eagles
Brent Stuart	–	–	–	–	–	PR	(Australia) Western Suburbs Magpies
John Timu	–	–	–	–	–	CE	(Australia) Sydney Bulldogs
Brendon Tuuta	–	–	–	–	–	LK / SR	(England) Castleford Tigers
Ruben Wiki	3	–	–	–	–	CE	(Australia) Canberra Raiders
Jason Williams	1	–	–	–	–	WG	(Australia) Sydney Bulldogs

== Papua New Guinea ==
- Coach: (Papua New Guinea) Joe Tokam
- Manager: Bob Robertson, James Korarome

Player	Games	Tries	Goals	Field Goals	Points	Position	Club
Michael Angara	1	–	–	–	–	SR	(Papua New Guinea) Mt Hagen Eagles
Marcus Bai	2	1	–	–	4	WG	(Papua New Guinea) Port Moresby Vipers
Ben Biri	1	–	–	–	–	PR	(Papua New Guinea) Port Moresby Vipers
David Buko	2	1	–	–	4	FB	(Papua New Guinea) Goroka Lahanis
Tuiyo Evei	1	–	–	–	–	PR	(Papua New Guinea) Goroka Lahanis
Stanley Gene	2	1	–	–	4	FE / HB	(Papua New Guinea) Lae Bombers
David Gomia	2	–	–	–	–	CE	(Papua New Guinea) Goroka Lahanis
August Joseph	–	–	–	–	–	CE	(Papua New Guinea) Rabaul Gurias
James Kops	2	–	–	–	–	WG	(Papua New Guinea) Mt Hagen Eagles
Joshua Kouoru	2	–	–	–	–	WG	
Adrian Lam (c)	2	1	–	–	4	HB	(Australia) Sydney City Roosters
Bruce Mamando	2	–	–	–	–	LK	(Australia) Canberra Raiders
Billy Noi	–	–	–	–	–		(Papua New Guinea) Mt Hagen Eagles
John Okul	2	–	–	–	–	CE	(Australia) Moorebank Rams
Elias Paiyo	2	1	5	–	14	HK	(Papua New Guinea) Port Moresby Vipers
Samuel Pinpin	–	–	–	–	–		(Papua New Guinea) Mendi Muruks
David Reeka	1	–	–	–	–		(Papua New Guinea) Lae Bombers
Lucas Solbat	2	1	–	–	4	PR	(Papua New Guinea) Rabaul Gurias
Robert Tela	1	–	–	–	–	CE / FE	
Petrus Thomas	–	–	–	–	–	FB	(Papua New Guinea) Mendi Muruks
Max Tiri	2	–	–	–	–	SR	(Papua New Guinea) Mt. Hagen Eagles
David Westley	2	–	–	–	–	PR / SR	(Australia) Canberra Raiders
Nande Yer	2	–	–	–	–	SR	(Papua New Guinea) Mendi Muruks

== South Africa ==
- Coach: (Wales) Tony Fisher
- Manager: Ockie Oosthuizen

Player	Games	Tries	Goals	Field Goals	Points	Position	Club
Jaco Alberts	2	–	–	–	–	SR / LK	(South Africa) Pretoria
Barend Alkema	3	–	–	–	–	FE / HB	Barea
Andrew Ballot	3	–	–	–	–	CE	(New Zealand) Bay of Plenty
Jaco Booysen (c)	3	–	–	–	–	PR	(England) Dewsbury Rams
Willem Boshoff	3	–	–	–	–	CE	
Francois Cloete	3	–	–	–	–	FE / HK	Barea
Guy Coombe	3	–	–	–	–	WG	(South Africa) Durban
Tim Fourie	3	–	–	–	–	SR / LK	(England) Dewsbury Rams
Pierre Grobbelaar	0	–	–	–	–	CE	(England) Dewsbury Rams
Kost Human	2	–	–	–	–	SR	(Australia) South Queensland
Justin Jennings	1	–	–	–	–	HK	(Australia) South Queensland
Mark Johnson	3	–	–	–	–	WG	(England) Workington Town
Elmar Lubbe	1	–	–	–	–		
Edwin Ludic	1	–	–	–	–		
John Mudgeway	1	–	–	–	–	LK	(South Africa) Durban
Eugene Powell	1	–	–	–	–	PR	City Scorpions
Nico Serfontein	1	–	–	–	–		(England) Hemel Hempstead
Kobus Van Deventer	3	–	–	–	–	HB / HK	(England) Dewsbury Rams
Jaco Van Niekerk	2	–	–	–	–	PR	Eastern Reds
Pierre Van Wyke	3	–	4	–	8	FB	Eastern Reds
Jaco Visser	1	–	–	–	–		
Gideon Watts	3	1	–	–	4	PR	(England) Dewsbury Rams
Gerald Williams	3	–	–	–	–	SR	(South Africa) Durban

== Tonga ==
- Coach: (New Zealand) Mike McClennan
- Manager: Graham Mattson

Player	Games	Tries	Goals	Field Goals	Points	Position	Club
Peni Amato	–	–	–	–	–	HK	(Tonga) Mu'a Saints
Asa Amone	2	–	6	–	12	FB / CE	(England) Halifax
Angelo Dymock	2	–	–	–	–	FE	(Australia) Moore Park
Salesi Finau	2	1	–	–	4	WG	(Australia) Canberra Raiders
Awen Guttenbeil	2	2	–	–	8	LK	(Australia) Manly Warringah Sea Eagles
Lee Hansen	2	–	–	–	–	PR	(England) Widnes Vikings
Solomon Haumono	2	–	–	–	–	SR	(Australia) Manly Warringah Sea Eagles
Phil Howlett	2	1	–	–	4	CE / FB	(Australia) Parramatta Eels
Talite Liava'a	1	–	–	–	–	SR	(Australia) Litchfield Bears
Luke Leilua	1	–	–	–	–		(New Zealand) Otahuhu
Tauʻalupe Liku	1	1	–	–	4	PR	(England) Leigh Centurions
Mateaki Mafi	–	–	–	–	–	WG	(Tonga) Kolomua
Duane Mann (c)	2	–	–	–	–	HK	(New Zealand) Auckland Warriors
George Mann	2	–	–	–	–	SR	(England) Leeds Rhinos
Martin Masella	2	–	–	–	–	PR	(Australia) Illawarra Steelers
Andrew Tangata-Toa	–	–	–	–	–	SR	(Australia) Newcastle Knights
Una Taufa	2	2	–	–	–	WG	(Australia) Canberra Raiders
Taukolo Tonga	1	–	–	–	–	SR	(Tonga) Kolomua
Tevita Vaikona	2	–	–	–	–	CE / WG	(England) Hull Sharks
Jimmy Veikoso	2	1	–	–	4	WG / CE	(Australia) West Belconnen Warriors
Frank Watene	–	–	–	–	–	PR	(New Zealand) Auckland
Willie Wolfgramm	2	2	–	–	8	HB / FE	(Australia) Narrandera

- Tonga were hit with the withdrawals of Jim Dymock and John Hopoate, who were both included in the Australian squad, and Gorden Tallis and Albert Fulivai, who both withdrew due to injury.

== Wales ==
- Coach: (Wales) Clive Griffiths
- Manager: Mike Nicholas

Player	Games	Tries	Goals	Field Goals	Points	Position	Club
Paul Atcheson	1	–	–	–	–	FB	(England) Oldham
Allan Bateman	3	–	–	–	–	CE	(Australia) Cronulla-Sutherland Sharks
Dean Busby	–	–	–	–	–	LF	(England) St Helens
Neil Cowie	1	–	–	–	–	PR	(England) Wigan Warriors
Keiron Cunningham	3	–	–	–	–	HK	(England) St Helens
Jonathan Davies (c)	3	–	10	1	21	SO / CE	(England) Warrington Wolves
John Devereux	3	1	–	–	4	CE / WG	(England) Widnes Vikings
Kevin Ellis	3	1	–	–	4	SO / SH	(Australia) North Queensland Cowboys
Richard Eyres	3	–	–	–	–	LF / SR	(England) Leeds Rhinos
Phil Ford	–	–	–	–	–	WG	(England) Salford City Reds
Scott Gibbs	2	–	–	–	–	CE	(England) St Helens
Jonathan Griffiths	–	–	–	–	–	SH / SO	(England) St Helens
Adrian Hadley	2	–	–	–	4	WG	(England) Widnes Vikings
Martin Hall	3	–	–	–	–	HK	(England) Wigan Warriors
Iestyn Harris	3	2	1	1	11	SO / FB	(England) Warrington Wolves
Mark Jones	2	–	–	–	–	PR	(England) Warrington Wolves
Paul Moriarty	3	–	–	–	–	SR	(England) Halifax Blue Sox
Mark Perrett	1	–	–	–	–	SR	(England) Halifax Blue Sox
Rowland Phillips	3	1	–	–	4	PR	(England) Workington Town
Scott Quinnell	2	–	–	–	–	SR	(England) Wigan Warriors
Kelvin Skerrett	3	–	–	–	–	SR	(England) Wigan Warriors
Gareth Stephens	–	–	–	–	–	SH	(England) Castleford Tigers
Anthony Sullivan	3	4	–	–	16	WG	(England) St Helens
Richard Webster	–	–	–	–	–	SR	(England) Salford City Reds
Dai Young	3	–	–	–	–	PR	(England) Salford City Reds

== Western Samoa ==
- Coach: (New Zealand) Graham Lowe
- Manager: Fou Solomona

Player	Games	Tries	Goals	Field Goals	Points	Position	Club
Fa'ausu Afoa	2	–	–	–	–	PR	(Australia) Penrith Panthers
Mark Elia	2	–	–	–	–	CE / WG	(France) Racing Club Albi XIII
Lolani Koko	1	–	–	–	–	WG	(Australia) Sydney City Roosters
Brian Laumatia	2	1	–	–	4	WG	(Australia) Cronulla-Sutherland Sharks
Des Maea	1	–	–	–	–	SR	(New Zealand) Auckland Warriors
Gus Malietoa-Brown	–	–	–	–	–	CE	(New Zealand) Auckland Warriors
Vila Matautia	2	3	–	–	12	SR	(England) St Helens
Sam Panapa	2	–	–	–	–	LK / FE	(England) Salford City Reds
Apollo Perelini	2	1	–	–	4	PR	(England) St Helens
Robert Piva	–	–	–	–	–	PR / SR	(Australia) North Queensland Cowboys
Willie Poching	2	–	–	–	–	SR / HK	(New Zealand) Auckland Warriors
Tea Ropati	2	–	–	–	–	CE / FE	(New Zealand) Auckland Warriors
John Schuster (c)	2	–	11	–	22	CE	(England) Halifax Blue Sox
Mike Setefano	–	–	–	–	–	SR	(New Zealand) North Harbour Sea Eagles
Se'e Solomona	2	–	–	–	–	PR	(New Zealand) Auckland Warriors
Henry Suluvale	–	–	–	–	–	WG	(Australia) Sydney City Roosters
Willie Swann	2	1	–	–	4	HB	(New Zealand) Auckland Warriors
Tony Tatupu	2	2	–	–	8	SR	(New Zealand) Auckland Warriors
Setu Tuilaepa	–	–	–	–	–		(Australia) Narrandera Lizards
Va'aiga Tuigamala	2	2	–	–	8	CE	(England) Wigan Warriors
Paki Tuimavave	2	1	–	–	4	FB	(New Zealand) North Harbour Sea Eagles
Tony Tuimavave	2	–	–	–	–	SR / LK	(New Zealand) Auckland Warriors
Earl Va'a	–	–	–	–	–	FB / FE	(New Zealand) Wellington City Dukes
Joe Vagana	2	–	–	–	–	PR	(New Zealand) Auckland Warriors
Nigel Vagana	–	–	–	–	–	CE	(New Zealand) Auckland Warriors
