= 1995 Rugby League World Cup Group A =

1995 Rugby League World Cup Group A was one of the three groups in the 1995 Rugby League World Cup. The group consisted of three countries: Australia, England, Fiji and South Africa.

== Ladder ==
Team	Pld	W	D	L	PF	PA	PD	Pts	Qualification
England	3	3	0	0	112	16	+96	6	Advances to knockout stage
Australia	3	2	0	1	168	26	+142	4	Advances to knockout stage
Fiji	3	1	0	2	52	118	−66	2	
South Africa	3	0	0	3	12	184	−172	0	

== England vs Australia ==
7 October 1995

England	20 – 16	Australia
Tries: Andy Farrell; Chris Joynt; Jason Robinson; Paul Newlove; Goals: Andy Farrell (2/4)		Tries: Steve Menzies (2); Mark Coyne Goals: Rod Wishart (2/3)

Wembley Stadium, London
Attendance: 41,271
Referee: Stuart Cummings (England)

England	Australia

FB	1	Kris Radlinski
RW	2	Jason Robinson
RC	3	Barrie-Jon Mather
LC	4	Paul Newlove
LW	5	John Bentley
SO	6	Daryl Powell
SH	7	Shaun Edwards (c)
PR	8	Karl Harrison
HK	9	Lee Jackson
PR	10	Andy Platt
SR	11	Denis Betts
SR	12	Phil Clarke
LF	13	Andy Farrell
Substitutions:
IC	14	Bobbie Goulding
IC	15	Simon Haughton
IC	16	Chris Joynt
IC	17
Coach:
(England) Phil Larder

FB	1	Tim Brasher
RW	2	Rod Wishart
RC	3	Mark Coyne
LC	4	Terry Hill
LW	5	John Hopoate
FE	6	Brad Fittler (c)
HB	7	Geoff Toovey
PR	8	David Gillespie
HK	9	Wayne Bartrim
PR	10	Mark Carroll
SR	11	Steve Menzies
SR	12	Dean Pay
LK	13	Jim Dymock
Substitutions:
IC	14	Matthew Johns
IC	15	Robbie O'Davis
IC	16	Jason Smith
IC	17	Paul Harragon
Coach:
(Australia) Bob Fulton

== Fiji vs South Africa ==
8 October 1995

Fiji	52 – 6	South Africa
Tries: Fili Seru (2); Waisale Sovatabua (2); Josaia Dakuitoga; Samuela Marayawa; Noa Nadruku; Kaleveti Naisoro; Ian Saigatu; Saveneca Taga; Goals: Noa Nayacaklou (3); Saveneca Taga (3)		Tries: Goals: Pierre Van Wyke (3)

Cougar Park, Keighley
Attendance: 4,845
Referee: David Manson (Australia)

Fiji	South Africa

FB	1	Waisale Sovatabua
RW	2	Josaia Dakuitoga
RC	3	Livai Nalagilagi (c)
LC	4	Fili Seru
LW	5	Noa Nadruku
FE	6	Noa Nayacaklou
HB	7	Savenaca Taga
PR	8	Malaki Kaunivalu
HK	9	Ian Saigatu
PR	10	Pio Nakubuwai
SR	11	Apisalome Degei
SR	12	Illiesa Toga
LK	13	Samuela Marayawa
Substitutions:
IC	14	Kaiava Salusalu
IC	15	Jioji Vatubua
IC	16	Ulaiasi Wainidroa
IC	17	Kaleveti Naisoro
Coach:
(Australia) Graham Murray

FB	1	Pierre Van Wyke
RW	2	Guy Coombe
RC	3	Andrew Ballot
LC	4	Willem Boshoff
LW	5	Mark Johnson
FE	6	Francois Cloete
HB	7	Barend Alkema
PR	8	Gideon Watts
HK	9	Kobus Van Deventer
PR	10	Jaco Booysen (c)
SR	11	Gerald Williams
SR	12	Tim Fourie
LK	13	Jaco Alberts
Substitutions:
IC	14	Edwin Ludic
IC	15	Kost Human
IC	16	Jaco Van Niekerk
IC	17
Coach:
(Wales) Tony Fisher

== Australia vs South Africa ==
The Kangaroos scored a World Cup and international league record 16 tries against minnows South Africa. Australian halfback Andrew Johns kicked 11 goals (from 16 attempts) to break the record for most goals kicked in a rugby league test. Gideon Watts scored the Rhinos only try of the tournament. With the selection of Cronulla hooker Aaron Raper, he became Australia's first second generation World Cup player following the footsteps of his famous father Johnny Raper who captained Australia to World Cup success in 1968. Australian coach Bob Fulton had been a team mate of Raper's father in the 1968 Rugby League World Cup final win over France.

10 October 1995

Australia	86 – 6	South Africa
Tries: John Hopoate (3); Andrew Johns (2); Danny Moore (2); Paul McGregor (2); Robbie O'Davis (2); Tim Brasher; Jim Dymock; Nik Kosef; Aaron Raper; Jason Smith; Goals: Andrew Johns (11/16)		Tries: Gideon Watts Goals: Pierre Van Wyke (1/1)

Gateshead International Stadium, Gateshead
Attendance: 9,181
Referee: Russell Smith (England)
Player of the Match: Andrew Johns

Australia	South Africa

FB	1	Robbie O'Davis
RW	2	Brett Dallas
RC	3	Danny Moore
LC	4	Paul McGregor
LW	5	John Hopoate
FE	6	Matthew Johns
HB	7	Andrew Johns
PR	8	Adam Muir
HK	9	Aaron Raper
PR	10	Paul Harragon (c)
SR	11	Billy Moore
SR	12	Jason Smith
LK	13	Nik Kosef
Substitutions:
IC	14	Tim Brasher
IC	15	Jim Dymock
IC	16	Wayne Bartrim
IC	17	Mark Carroll
Coach:
(Australia) Bob Fulton

FB	1	Pierre Van Wyke
RW	2	Guy Coombe
RC	3	Andrew Ballot
LC	4	Willem Boshoff
LW	5	Mark Johnson
FE	6	Barend Alkema
HB	7	Kobus Van Deventer
PR	8	Gideon Watts
HK	9	Francois Cloete
PR	10	Jaco Booysen (c)
SR	11	Gerald Williams
SR	12	Kost Human
LK	13	Tim Fourie
Substitutions:
IC	14	Eugene Powell
IC	15	Nico Serfontein
IC	16	Jaco Van Niekerk
IC	17
Coach:
(Wales) Tony Fisher

== England vs Fiji ==
England captain Shaun Edwards was on the bench and remained there for the entire game amid rumours of a knee injury. The rumours turned out to be true and Edwards did not play again in the tournament. The captaincy was then handed to former Wigan team mate Denis Betts making history by becoming the first player chosen to captain England while not playing in the English premiership. Betts at the time was playing for the Auckland Warriors in the Australian Rugby League competition.

11 October 1995

England	46 – 0	Fiji
Tries: Jason Robinson (2); John Bentley; Simon Haughton; Tony Smith; Paul Newlove; Paul Broadbent; Kris Radlinski; Goals: Andy Farrell (4); Bobbie Goulding (2)		Tries: Goals:

Central Park, Wigan
Attendance: 26,263
Referee: Dennis Hale (New Zealand)

England	Fiji

FB	1	Kris Radlinski
RW	2	Jason Robinson
RC	3	Nick Pinkney
LC	4	Paul Newlove
LW	5	John Bentley
SO	6	Tony Smith
SH	7	Bobbie Goulding
PR	8	Paul Broadbent
HK	9	Lee Jackson
PR	10	Dean Sampson
SR	11	Denis Betts (c)
SR	12	Mick Cassidy
LF	13	Andy Farrell
Substitutions:
IC	14	Paul Cook
IC	15	Simon Haughton
IC	16	Shaun Edwards
IC	17	Steve McCurrie
Coach:
(England) Phil Larder

FB	1	Waisale Sovatabua
RW	2	Josaia Dakuitoga
RC	3	Livai Nalagilagi (c)
LC	4	Fili Seru
LW	5	Noa Nadruku
FE	6	Noa Nayacaklou
HB	7	Savenaca Taga
PR	8	Malaki Kaunivalu
HK	9	Ian Saigatu
PR	10	Pio Nakubuwai
SR	11	Apisalome Degei
SR	12	Illiesa Toga
LK	13	Samuela Marayawa
Substitutions:
IC	14	Niumaia Korovata
IC	15	Ulaiasi Wainidroa
IC	16	Jioji Vatubua
IC	17	Kaleveti Naisoro
Coach:
(Australia) Graham Murray

== Australia vs Fiji ==
14 October 1995

Australia	66 – 0	Fiji
Tries: Brett Dallas (3); Steve Menzies (2); Terry Hill (2); Robbie O'Davis (3); Gary Larson; Tim Brasher; Goals: Andrew Johns (9)		Tries: Goals:

Alfred McAlpine Stadium, Huddersfield
Attendance: 7,127
Referee: Eddie Ward (Australia)

Australia	Fiji

FB	1	Tim Brasher
RW	2	Brett Dallas
RC	3	Mark Coyne
LC	4	Terry Hill
LW	5	Robbie O'Davis
FE	6	Brad Fittler (c)
HB	7	Geoff Toovey
PR	8	Dean Pay
HK	9	Andrew Johns
PR	10	Mark Carroll
SR	11	Steve Menzies
SR	12	Gary Larson
LK	13	Jim Dymock
Substitutions:
IC	14	Paul McGregor
IC	15	Matthew Johns
IC	16	Jason Smith
IC	17	Nik Kosef
Coach:
(Australia) Bob Fulton

FB	1	Waisale Sovatabua
RW	2	Orisi Cavuilati
RC	3	Livai Nalagilagi (c)
LC	4	Fili Seru
LW	5	Noa Nadruku
FE	6	Noa Nayacaklou
HB	7	Savenaca Taga
PR	8	Malaki Kaunivalu
HK	9	Ian Saigatu
PR	10	Pio Nakubuwai
SR	11	Josaia Dakuitoga
SR	12	Samuela Davetawalu
LK	13	Niumaia Korovata
Substitutions:
IC	14	Kaleveti Naisoro
IC	15	Jioji Vatubua
IC	16	Waisale Vatubua
IC	17	Kiniviliame Koroibuleka
Coach:
(Australia) Graham Murray

== England vs South Africa ==
England went into the match already having booked a Semi-final berth. For South Africa, the Rhinos had pride on the line and the want to not have England put a big score on them. The Rhinos earned the respect of their opponents and the 14,041 crowd at Headingley with a willing display.

14 October 1995

England	46 – 0	South Africa
Tries: Nick Pinkney (2); Simon Haughton; Bobbie Goulding; Dean Sampson; Paul Broadbent; John Bentley; Kris Radlinski; Tony Smith; Goals: Bobbie Goulding (7)		Tries: Goals:

Headingley, Leeds
Attendance: 14,041
Referee: David Manson (Australia)

England	South Africa

FB	1	Paul Cook
RW	2	John Bentley
RC	3	Nick Pinkney
LC	4	Barrie-Jon Mather
LW	5	Martin Offiah
SO	6	Daryl Powell
SH	7	Bobbie Goulding
PR	8	Karl Harrison
HK	9	Mick Cassidy
PR	10	Andy Platt
SR	11	Simon Haughton
SR	12	Chris Joynt
LF	13	Phil Clarke (c)
Substitutions:
IC	14	Kris Radlinski
IC	15	Paul Broadbent
IC	16	Tony Smith
IC	17	Dean Sampson
Coach:
(England) Phil Larder

FB	1	Pierre Van Wyke
RW	2	Guy Coombe
RC	3	Tim Fourie
LC	4	Willem Boshoff
LW	5	Andrew Ballot
FE	6	Mark Johnson
HB	7	Barend Alkema
PR	8	Gideon Watts
HK	9	Kobus Van Deventer
PR	10	Jaco Booysen (c)
SR	11	Gerald Williams
SR	12	Jaco Alberts
LK	13	John Mudgeway
Substitutions:
IC	14	Justin Jennings
IC	15	Francois Cloete
IC	16	Elmar Lubbe
IC	17	Jaco Visser
Coach:
(Wales) Tony Fisher
