= Super League World Nines =

World Nines
- Sport: Rugby league
- Instituted: 1996
- Ceased: 1997
- Region: International (SLIB)
- Most titles: New Zealand (2 titles)

The Super League World Nines (known as the Gatorade Super League World Nines due to sponsorship), was a pre-season rugby league nines tournament between national sides. Set up in the midst of the Super League war and created in opposition to the Australian Rugby League's World Sevens tournament, the tournament was held twice before being abandoned when the two factions merged to form the National Rugby League.

== History ==
=== 1996 Super League World Nines Tournament ===
The 1996 World Nines were held at National Stadium in Suva, Fiji from 22 February to 24 February. The winner of this competition was New Zealand, who won their first world trophy in a rugby league competition. New Zealand were awarded A$30,000 for the win.

The 1996 World Nines marked the first time that a video referee was used for a game of Rugby League or Rugby Union . Due to a court ruling in the Federal Court of Australia, this was the only Super League competition held in 1996.

=== 1997 Tournament ===
The 1997 World Nines were held in Townsville, Queensland from 31 January to 2 February. New Zealand won this competition for the second year in a row.

== Squads ==
=== 1996 Tournament. ===
All teams were selected as professional playing squads.

Sixteen squads competed in Suva: - Ireland played in a warm up test V's Australia at the Fiji National Stadium in the week leading up to the World Nines. 14 February 1996. Australia winning 22:12.

John Kirwan (New Zealand) won a Rugby Union World Cup Winners Medal with the All Blacks in the 1st ever Rugby World Cup 1987. Kirwan would go on to Coach both Italy and Japan National Rugby Union Teams

Henry Paul (New Zealand) would represent ~ Bath, Gloucester and England in Rugby Union.

Gary Connolly, of England, and Martin Hall, the Welsh captain, were forced to withdraw from their respective squads after being threatened with legal action by the Australian Rugby League.

*Gary Connolly would go on to transfer to play for Munster Rugby Union 1998 - Ireland.

Scott Quinnell, Allan Bateman (Wales) would both return to Rugby Union and play for the British & Irish Lions in the winning series v's South Africa.

Iestyn Harris (Wales) would represent Wales in Rugby Union.

Andy Farrell (England) went on the represent England in Rugby Union, and to coach England and later Ireland in Rugby Union

Georgie Graham (Scotland) would represent Scotland in Rugby Union

NEW ZEALAND Coach - Graeme Norton: 1. Sean Hoppe (c) 2. John Kirwan 3. Stephen Kearney 4. Nigel Vagana 5. Gene Ngamu 6. Tony Tatupu 7. Gavin Hill 8. Mark Carter 9. Stacey Jones 10. Tony Iro 11. Richie Barnett 12. Henry Paul 13. Ruben Wiki 14. Latham Tawhai	PAPUA NEW GUINEA Coach -	AUSTRALIA Coach - Mal Meninga: 1. Robbie Beckett 2. Jason Croker 3. Laurie Daley (c) 4. Andrew Ettingshausen 5. David Furner 6. Simon Gillies 7. Paul Green 8. Michael Hancock 9. Jason Hetherington 10. Glenn Lazarus 11. Brett Mullins 12. Steve Renouf 13. Wendell Sailor 14. Ricky Stuart 15. Kevin Walters	ENGLAND Coach -: 1. Rob Smyth 2. Phil Cantillon
WALES Coach -Clive Griffiths: 1. Allan Bateman (Cronulla) 2. Iestyn Harris 3. Mark Jones (both Warrington) 4. Paul Atcheson 5. Neil Cowie 6. Scott Quinnell (all Wigan) 7. Jason Critchley 8. Gareth Cochrane (both Keighley) 9. Gareth Stephens (Castleford) 10. Gavin Price-Jones (Swinton) 11. Ian Watson (Salford) 12. Mark Perrett (Halifax) 13. Rowland Phillips (Workington) 14. John Donno (Widnes)	WESTERN SAMOA Coach - Max McCamish: 1. Tea Ropati (c) 2. Willie Poching 3. Mike Setefano 4. Robert Piva 5. Bryan Laumatia 6.Fetuao Peeleti 7. Faamati Laumanuvae 8. Tuti Godinet 9. Sinoti Fuanonofo 10. Okesene Moananu 11. Siu Amosa 12. Wayne Schuster	TONGA Coach -	IRELAND Coach - Niel Wood Physio - Seamus McCallion Manager - Ramsay Fawell: 1. James Lowes (Bradford Bulls) 2. Mick Finlay (Dublin Blues & Wanderers FC) 3. Leo Casey ( ) 4. Eugene McEntegart (Dublin Blues & London Irish) 5. Tom McCabe (Dublin Blues & Lansdowne FC) 6. Phelim Comerford (Dublin Blues & Lansdowne FC) 7. Eric Doyle (Dublin Blues & Monkstown FC. 8. Seamus McCallion (Halifax RLFC) 9. Paddy Owens ( ) 10. Conor O'Sullivan (Dublin Blues) 11. Ricky Smith (Bangor Vikings NI) Craig McElhatton (Bradford Bulls)
FIJI Coach -	FRANCE Coach -	ITALY Coach -	SCOTLAND Coach - George Fairbairn: 1. Chris Simmers 2. Alisdair Blee 3. Nick Mardon 4. Darrall Shelford 5. James Cowan 6. Graeme Thompson 7. Darren Shaw 8. Danny Russell 9. Bill McGinty 10. Gary Murdock 11. Steve Tait 12. George Graham 13. Sean Cusack 14. Billy Gamba 15. Scott Gilmour
COOK ISLANDS Coach -: 1. Meti Noovao	UNITED STATES Coach -: 1. David Di Sorbio 2. Kevin Gittings 3. Robert Balachandran 4. Terry Wallace 5. Prince Hill 6. Kevin Cassidy 7. Aaron Tucker 8. Mike Evergin 9. Fred Gruhler 10. David Bowe 11. Shelton Davis 12. Rob Anna 13. Greg Stelluti 14. Mike Loader 15. Britton Coffman 16. Chris Veally 17. Nick Bell	MOROCCO Coach -	JAPAN Coach -

=== 1997 Tournament ===
Twelve squads of fourteen players competed in Townsville:

GREAT BRITAIN Coach – Andy Gregory: 1. Andy Farrell (c) 2. Stuart Spruce 3. Scott Naylor 4. Martin Crompton 5. John Bentley 6. Chris Smith 7. Keith Senior 8. Barrie-Jon Mather 9. Denis Betts 10. Tommy Martyn 11. Iestyn Harris 12. Adrian Morley 13. Stephen Holgate 14. Tulsen Tollett	WESTERN SAMOA Coach – Mark Graham: 1. Apollo Perelini 2. Vila Matautia 3. John Schuster 4. Willie Swann 5. Bryan Laumatia 6. Iva Ropati 7. Logan Swann 8. Tea Ropati 9. Phillip Leuluai 10. Jerry Seuseu 11. Anthony Swann 12. Nigel Vagana 13. Fata Sini 14. Matt Sauvao	JAPAN Coach – Max Mannix: 1. Masami Fukada 2. Yoshihiro Noda 3. Jun Kanezawa 4. Kenichiro Yukamizu 5. Takeshi Muda 6. Kiyoto Kobayashi 7. Greg Mannix (c) 8. Toru Suzuki 9. Yuji Suzuki 10. Yoshikazu Kanemaru 11. Kazumi Iida 12. Natsutake Haga 13. Kenji Morita 14. Soji Mitobe	TONGA Coach – Duane Mann: 1. Franklin Fonua 2. Lesley Vainikolo 3. Paul Kulon 4. Cheaf Fakavamoenga 5. Peter Tanginoa 6. Koliniasi Filiai 7. Tevita Tuifua 8. Malupo Liutai 9. Esau Mann 10. Sune Atoa 11. Takai Taulanga 12. Pauliasi Masoe 13. Willie Wolfgramm 14. Atunaisa Fotu
SOUTH AFRICA Coach – Paul Matete: 1. Tiaan Strauss (c) 2. Andy Marinos 3. Kevin Schrader 4. Tim Fourie 5. Warren McCann 6. Andrew Ballot 7. Mark Johnson 8. Hannes Venter 9. Walter McGreachey 10. Michael Horak 11. Andre Erasmus 12. Justin Jennings 13. Cornelius Nel 14. Johnny Gernum	FRANCE Coach – Ivan Grésèque: 1. Frederic Banquet 2. Pascal Bomati 3. Jerôme Alonso 4. Hadji Boudebza 5. Ludovic Daure 6. Patrick Torreilles 7.David Despin 8. Arnaud Dulac 9. Bruno Vergis 10. Jerome Guisset 11. Pascal Jampy 12. Gaël Tallec 13. Frederic Teixido 14. Eric Vergniol	UNITED STATES Coach – Greg Gerard: 1. Terry Wallace 2. David Niu (c) 3. Ryan McCough 4. Loren Broussard 5. Jeff Preston 6. Prince Hill 7. David Bowe 8. Laau Affumango 9. Robert Balachandran 10. Greg Schor 11. Fred Gruhler 12. Brian Geraghty 13. Marcus Maffei 14. Doug Erickson	AUSTRALIA Coach – Tim Sheens: 1. Ryan Girdler 2. Andrew Ettingshausen 3. Allan Langer (c) 4. Wendell Sailor 5. Steve Renouf 6. Gorden Tallis 7. Jason Croker 8. Brett Hetherington 9. David Furner 10. Paul Green 11. Steve Walters 12. Michael Hancock 13. Glenn Lazarus 14. Kevin Walters
PAPUA NEW GUINEA Coach – Gabriel Kiluwa: 1. Ruben Ruing 2. Marcus Bai 3. John Okul 4. Robert Siu 5. Sam Wuvua 6. James Kops 7. Mark Mom 8. Robert Tela 9. Elias Paiyo 10. David Westley (c) 11. Raymond Karl 12. Bruce Mamando 13. Simon Kundi 14. Jackery Kipsi	NEW ZEALAND Coach – Graeme Norton: 1. Stacey Jones 2. Marc Ellis 3. Stephen Kearney (c) 4. Joe Vagana 5. Shane Endacott 6. Richie Barnett 7. Ruben Wiki 8. Quentin Pongia 9. Robbie Paul 10. Tony Tatupu 11. Tony Iro 12. Tyran Smith 13. John Timu 14. Jason Williams. Henry Paul, Matthew Ridge, Sean Hoppe, Grant Young and Gene Ngamu all withdrew due to injuries.	COOK ISLANDS Coach – Paul McGreal: 1. Patrick Kuru 2. Clive Arona 3. Zane Clark 4. Alex Kermonde 5. Bob Hunter 6. Meti Noovao 7. Tauel Shepherd 8. William Puaru 9. Kevin Iro 10. Craig Bowen 11. Ali Davys 12. Richard Piakura 13. Lloyd Matapo 14. Taimati Amosa	FIJI Coach – Etuwate Waqa: 1. Timogi Vatakuli 2. Matareti Mautau 3. Paula Baravilula 4. Inoke Ratudina 5. Joe Tamani 6. Kalaveti Naisoro 7. Ilatia Takaladau 8. Meli Kaidroka 9. Stan Tulevu 10. Samuela Marayawa 11. Luga Gonegali 12. Sakuisa Vulaono 13. Vula Dakuitoga 14. Saimoni Camaitoga

== Finals ==
Year	Winners	Score	Runner-up	Trophy	Plate	Bowl	Host	Source
1996	New Zealand	24-10	Papua New Guinea	Wales	Fiji	Cook Islands	Suva, Fiji	
1997	New Zealand	16-0	Western Samoa	Not awarded	Fiji	Tonga	Townsville, Australia	

== See also ==
NRL Auckland Nines
