= Kaiava Salusalu =

Former Fiji dual-code rugby international footballer

Personal information
- Born: 8 May 1957 (age 69) Yasawa, Ba, Fiji
- Height: 5 ft 7 in (1.70 m)
- Weight: 196 lb (14 st 0 lb; 89 kg)

Playing information

Rugby union
- Position: Centre
Club
Years	Team	Pld	T	G	FG	P
199?–??	Suva
Representative
Years	Team	Pld	T	G	FG	P
1982–90	Fiji	14	9			36

Rugby league
- Position: Prop
Representative
Years	Team	Pld	T	G	FG	P
1995	Fiji	1	0	0	0	0
1996	Fiji NRL	1	0	0	0	0
- Source: As of 12 February 2021
- Relatives: Semisi Tora (son)

Kaiava Salusalu, written also as Kaiyava Salusalu (born Ba, 8 May 1957) is a Fijian former rugby union and rugby league footballer who played as a centre.

He is father of Semisi Tora, who plays for Nyngan Tigers and Fiji Bati.

== Career ==
=== Rugby union career ===
His first international cap for Fiji was in the match against Tonga, at Suva, on 28 August 1982. He was also part of the 1987 Rugby World Cup, where he played two matches in the tournament. Salusalu also played for the South Pacific Barbarians, on a rebel tour in South Africa. His last international cap was during the match against Samoa, at Nausori, on 23 June 1990.

=== Rugby league career ===
Later, he played in 1992 the first match of the Fiji Bati and switched code to rugby league. Salusalu was part of the 1995 Rugby League World Cup Fiji squad. In 1996, Salusalu, who captained the Fiji Bati against Australia during the Super League war. as well in the matches where Fiji beat Tonga, Samoa and Papua New Guinea, where also played Kalaveti Naisoro, Mesake Navugona, Vula Dakuitoga, Jioji Vatubua, Nimilote Ratudina and Savenaca Taga. As of 2017, Salusalu coaches Yasawa, a rugby league team from his home village.
