= Vincent Banet =

Former France international rugby league footballer

Personal information
- Born: France

Playing information
- Position: Scrum-half
Club
| Years | Team | Pld | T | G | FG | P |
|---|---|---|---|---|---|---|
| | Catalan |
| 1994–95 | Workington Town |
| 1995–9? | Limoux |
| | Carcassonne |
| | Total | 0 | 0 | 0 | 0 | 0 |
Representative
| Years | Team | Pld | T | G | FG | P |
| 1995–98 | France | 3 | 0 | 0 | 0 | 0 |

Vincent Banet is a French rugby league footballer who represented France at the 1995 World Cup.

== Playing career ==
From the Catalan club, Banet played for the France under-18's in a 1993 match against their Great Britain counterparts.

He was later signed by Workington Town, and made his début in October 1994.

He returned to France after the season, joining the Limoux club. In 1995 he made his début for France, coming off the bench in one match at the 1995 World Cup.

He played in two more matches for France, against South Africa in 1997 and Scotland in 1998.

In 2002 he played for the Carcassonne Canaries.
