= Michael Horak =

South Africa international rugby league & England international rugby union player

- Born: Michael John Horak; 3 June 1977 (age 49) Johannesburg, South Africa
- Height: 6 ft 3 in (1.91 m)
- Weight: 92 kg (14 st 7 lb)
- School: Grey College

Rugby union career
- Position(s): Fullback, Wing
Senior career
Years	Team	Apps	(Points)
1997–1999	Leicester Tigers	25	(50)
1999	Bristol	3	(22)
1999–2007	London Irish	107	(110)
2007–2009	Treviso	19	(30)
2009–2010	Saracens	1	(0)
- Correct as of 8 November 2009
International career
Years	Team	Apps	(Points)
2002	England Saxons		
2002	England	1	(0)
- Correct as of 22 June 2002
Coaching career
- Years: Team
- 2010–2014: Free State Cheetahs (defensive coach)
- 2013–2014: UFS Shimlas
- 2014: Eastern Province Kings (defensive coach)
- 2015–present: Sharks (defensive coach)
- Correct as of 23 November 2014
- Rugby league career

Playing information
- Position: Fullback
Club
Years	Team	Pld	T	G	FG	P
1997	Perth Reds
Representative
Years	Team	Pld	T	G	FG	P
	South Africa

Michael John Horak (born 3 June 1977) is a South African former rugby union and rugby league footballer who played in the 1990s, 2000s and 2010s, and rugby union coach. He represented South Africa in rugby league, and played one game for England in rugby union. He last played at fullback or wing for Saracens.

== Background ==
Michael Horak was born in Johannesburg, South Africa.

== Career ==
=== Playing career ===
After playing for the Free State Schools Craven Week side in 1995 and the Free State U21s in 1996 he moved to Australia to play rugby league, and played for the Perth Reds. He has also played for South Africa, including at the 1997 Super League World Nines.

Horak was signed by Bob Dwyer for the Leicester Tigers in 1997 and became Leicester's first-choice full back, replacing the retiring John Liley and ahead of Fijian international Waisale Serevi. He also played for the England U21 side. However, he dropped to third choice after Tiger's signing of Tim Stimpson and Geordan Murphy.

Horak subsequently followed Dwyer to Bristol before signing for London Irish in 1999. He left Irish in 2000 but re-signed in 2001.

He started in the 2002 Powergen Cup Final at Twickenham, scoring a try as London Irish defeated the Northampton Saints.

His solitary England cap came during the tour of Argentina, on 22 June 2002 at the Estadio José Amalfitani. He qualifies for England via his English mother.

After spending two seasons with Benetton Treviso, Horak signed with Saracens for the 2009–10 season but announced his retirement with immediate effect in January 2010. He is a tall player with a big left boot.

=== Coaching career ===
In 2010, Free State Cheetahs head coach Naka Drotské appointed Horak as the defence coach and head of the Cheetahs academy prior to the 2010 Currie Cup Premier Division competition. He became the general manager of the team in 2011 and also helped out as defensive coach at the Griffons in 2011.

At the end of 2012, he relinquished his role as general manager at the Free State Cheetahs to take over as director of rugby as well as head coach at Varsity Cup side UFS Shimlas prior to the 2013 Varsity Cup competition, but still continued as Cheetahs defensive coach.

At the start of 2014, it was announced that he signed a five-year contract to join the Eastern Province Kings as defensive coach, following the completion of Shimlas' 2014 Varsity Cup campaign. However, he spent just one season in Port Elizabeth before joining the Sharks for the 2015 season.
