= Corne Nel =

South African rugby league footballer

Personal information
- Full name: Cornelius Nel
- Born: South Africa

Playing information
Representative
Years	Team	Pld	T	G	FG	P
1997–2000	South Africa	4	0	0	0	0

Corne Nel is a South African rugby league footballer who represented his country in the 2000 World Cup.

== Playing career ==
Nel first played for South Africa in a 1997 match against France. He also played in the 1997 Super League World Nines tournament.

In 2000 he played in another international for South Africa, against Wales, and was then named in the countries squad for the 2000 World Cup. He played in two matches at the tournament.
