= Serfontein =

Serfontein is a surname. Notable people with the surname include:

- Boela Serfontein (born 1988), South African rugby union player
- Divan Serfontein (born 1954), South African rugby union player
- Jan Serfontein (born 1993), South African rugby union rugby player
- Nico Serfontein (born 1968), South African rugby football coach and former player
