= Centenary World Cup (disambiguation) =

Centenary World Cup usually refers to the 2030 FIFA World Cup, an association football tournament predominantly hosted by Spain, Portugal and Morocco and celebrating the 100th birthday of the FIFA World Cup in 1930

It may also refer to:

- 1995 Rugby League World Cup, hosted by England and celebrating the 100th birthday of Rugby league
- 2008 Rugby League World Cup, hosted by Australia and celebrating the 100th birthday of Rugby league in Australia
