= Justin Jennings =

Justin Jennings may refer to:

- Justin Jennings (rugby league), South African rugby league player
- Justin Jennings (racing driver) (born 1992), American racing driver
