= Eugene Powell =

South African rugby league footballer

Personal information
- Born: South Africa

Playing information
- Position: Prop
Representative
| Years | Team | Pld | T | G | FG | P |
|---|---|---|---|---|---|---|
| 1995–2000 | South Africa | 5 | 0 | 0 | 0 | 0 |

Eugene Powell is a South African former rugby league footballer who represented South Africa in the 1995 and 2000 World Cups.
