= Taukolo Tonga =

Tongan rugby league footballer

Personal information
- Born: Tonga

Playing information
Representative
Years	Team	Pld	T	G	FG	P
1994–95	Tonga	2	0	0	0	0
- Source: RLP

Taukolo Tonga is a Tongan rugby league footballer who represented Tonga at the 1995 World Cup.
