= Kost Human =

South African rugby player

Personal information
- Born: South Africa

Playing information
- Position: Second-row
Representative
Years	Team	Pld	T	G	FG	P
1995	South Africa	2	0	0	0	0

Kost Human is a South African former rugby league footballer who represented South Africa at the 1995 World Cup, playing in two matches.
