= Guy Coombe =

South African rugby league footballer

Personal information
- Full name: Andrew Guy Coombe
- Born: South Africa

Playing information
- Position: Wing
Club
Years	Team	Pld	T	G	FG	P
1996	Dewsbury Rams
Representative
Years	Team	Pld	T	G	FG	P
1995	South Africa	3	0	0	0	0

Guy Coombe is a South African former rugby league footballer who represented South Africa at the 1995 World Cup, playing in all three matches in which they were involved.

In 1996 he spent the season at the Dewsbury Rams, along with several other South African World Cup players.

He has a wife, 2 sons and a daughter.
