= Niumaia Korovata =

Fiji dual-code rugby international player

Personal information
- Born: Fiji

Playing information

Rugby union
- Position: Wing
Representative
Years	Team	Pld	T	G	FG	P
1990–91	Fiji	3	4	0	0	16

Rugby league
- Position: Wing, Centre, Lock
Representative
Years	Team	Pld	T	G	FG	P
1994–95	Fiji	3	0	0	0	0

Niumaia Korovata, also known by the nickname of "Horse", is a Fijian former dual-code international rugby union and rugby league footballer who played in the 1990s and 2000s. He played representative rugby union (RU) for Fiji and representative rugby league (RL) for Fiji, as a wing, centre or lock, including at the 1995 Rugby League World Cup. Niumaia Korovata now is retired from playing and is living with his wife and 4 children. Anna, Ruth, Grace and only son Niumaia jnr.

== Playing career ==
Korovata is from Ra Province.

He originally played rugby union for the Police club, and played nine games, including three test matches, for Fiji in 1990 and 1991.

Korovata then switched codes to rugby league. He joined the Yanco Wamoon Hawks in the Group 20 Rugby League competition, winning premierships with the team in 1994, 1995 and 1996. In 1995 he also represented the NSW Country sevens side. He also won the club's Best and Fairest award in 1996. From Group 20 he was selected as part of the Fijian 1995 World Cup squad and played in two matches at the tournament.

In 2005 Korovata was part of the Yanco Wamoon reserve grade side that lost the Reserve grade grand final.
