= Francois Cloete =

South African rugby league footballer

Francois Cloete is a South African former professional rugby league footballer who represented the South Africa (Die renosters (The Rhinos)) at the 1995 and 2000 World Cups.

He played in five full internationals for the Rhinos, and also captained the Students team in 1996. In 2006 he led the South African side on a tour of Italy and was the side's vice captain in 2007. Cloete played for the Eastern Eagles RLC club in South Africa.
