= Kobus Van Deventer =

South African rugby league footballer

Personal information
- Born: South Africa

Playing information
- Position: Halfback, Hooker
Club
Years	Team	Pld	T	G	FG	P
1996	Dewsbury Rams
Representative
Years	Team	Pld	T	G	FG	P
1995–1997	South Africa	4	0	0	0	0

Kobus Van Deventer is a South African former rugby league footballer who represented South Africa at the 1995 World Cup.

== Playing career ==
Van Deventer started his rugby career whilst still in primary school, and played the Craven week. He also played Union Rugby in several local South African clubs including RAU, Simmer and Roodepoort and also played rugby union for the Provincial team of Transvaal from 1993 to 1995 as Scrumhalf.

Van Deventer played in three matches for the South African Rhinos in the 1995 World Cup, starting one at halfback and two at hooker.

In 1996 he spent the season at the Dewsbury Rams, along with several other South African World Cup players. Despite the hype surrounding their arrival, the imports failed to make a lasting impression at the club and returned home the following year.

In 1997 he started at halfback for South Africa in their 30-17 test loss to France.

In 1999 he played Union Rugby for 3 months in Kansas for the Jayhawks and then returned to South Africa.

Van Deventer received provincial colours for the Golden Oldies rugby team in 2008 and also played in the Business league.
