= Gerald Williams (rugby league) =

South Africa international rugby league footballer

Personal information
- Born: 4 December 1968 (age 56) Wales

Playing information
- Position: Second-row
Club
Years	Team	Pld	T	G	FG	P
1995–1996	Warrington	1	0	0	0	0
Representative
Years	Team	Pld	T	G	FG	P
1995	South Africa	3	0	0	0	0

Gerald Williams is a Welsh former professional rugby league footballer who represented South Africa at the 1995 World Cup.

== Playing career ==
Williams played for the South African Rhinos in the 1995 World Cup, starting all three matches as a second-row. He then played for the Warrington Wolves in the 1995-96 Rugby Football League.
