= Jaco Booysen =

Former South Africa international rugby league footballer

Personal information
- Born: 1966 or 1967 (age 57–58); South Africa

Playing information

Rugby union
- Position: Flanker
Club
| Years | Team | Pld | T | G | FG | P |
|---|---|---|---|---|---|---|
| 1987–2001 | Eastern Transvaal | 132 |
| | Northern Transvaal |
| | Total | 132 | 0 | 0 | 0 | 0 |

Rugby league
- Position: Prop
Club
| Years | Team | Pld | T | G | FG | P |
|---|---|---|---|---|---|---|
| 1996 | Dewsbury Rams |
Representative
| Years | Team | Pld | T | G | FG | P |
| 1995–2000 | South Africa | 25 | 0 | 0 | 0 | 0 |
- Source: RLP

Jaco Booysen is a South African former rugby union and rugby league footballer who played in the 1980s, 1990s and 2000s. He played representative rugby league (RL) for South Africa in rugby league at the 1995 Rugby League World Cup and 2000 Rugby League World Cup.

== Rugby union career ==
Booysen made his début for Eastern Transvaal in 1987. He had a brief stint with Northern Transvaal but returned to Eastern Transvaal and later captained the side. When Booysen retired in 2001 after a severe neck injury he had played 132 matches for the Falcons.

== Rugby league career ==
Booysen played for the South African Rhinos 25 times in rugby league. He captained the side at the 1995 World Cup and was also part of the squad at the 2000 World Cup.

In 1996 he spent the season at the Dewsbury Rams, along with several other South African World Cup players. Despite the hype surrounding their arrival, the imports failed to make a lasting impression at the club and returned home the following year.
