= Tim Fourie =

South Africa former rugby footballer

Personal information
- Full name: Timothy Wayne Fourie
- Born: 12 March 1968 (age 57); Port Elizabeth, South Africa
- Height: 1.96 m (6 ft 5 in)
- Weight: 107 kg (16 st 12 lb)

Playing information

Rugby league
- Position: Centre, Second-row
Club
Years	Team	Pld	T	G	FG	P
1996	Dewsbury Rams
Representative
Years	Team	Pld	T	G	FG	P
1995	South Africa	3	0	0	0	0

Rugby union
- Position: Lock / Back Row
Club
Years	Team	Pld	T	G	FG	P
1998–2000	Leeds Tykes	54	17	0	0	85

Tim Fourie is a South Africa former rugby footballer who represented South Africa in rugby league at the 1995 World Cup.

== Playing career ==
Fourie played for the South African Rhinos in the 1995 World Cup, playing in all three matches.

In 1996, he spent the season at the Dewsbury Rams, along with several other South African World Cup players. Despite the hype surrounding their arrival, the imports failed to make a lasting impression at the club.

He participated in the 1997 Super League World Nines for South Africa.

Between 1998 and 2000, he played rugby union for the Leeds Tykes.

He later captained Sedgley Park RUFC and then played for Rossendale RUFC.
