= Livai Nalagilagi =

Former Fiji international rugby league footballer

Personal information
- Born: Fiji

Playing information
- Position: Centre
Club
Years	Team	Pld	T	G	FG	P
1994	Penrith Panthers	11	2	0	0	8
Representative
Years	Team	Pld	T	G	FG	P
1993–96	Fiji	≥7	≥2	0	0	≥8

Livai "Lee" Nalagilagi is a Fijian former rugby league footballer who played as a centre for the Penrith Panthers and represented the Fijian national team, most notably as captain at the 1995 World Cup.

== Playing career ==
In 1990, Nalagilagi was playing for Ryde-Eastwood in the Metropolitan Cup. The following year, he played for Guildford in the same competition.

In February 1992, Nalagilagi was selected in Fiji's inaugural national team for the 1992 World Sevens. In August 1992, Nalagilagi represented Fiji at the Tertiary Student Rugby League World Cup. He left the tournament early to join Fiji's tour of Queensland, but was still named in the team of the tournament.

In July 1993, it was announced that Nalagilagi and his fellow Fijian Joe Dakuitoga would join the Penrith Panthers on two-year contracts. He played 11 first-grade games for Penrith during the 1994 season.

Nalagilagi captained Fiji at the 1995 Rugby League World Cup.
