= Malakai Kaunaivalu =

Fiji international rugby league footballer

Personal information
- Full name: Malakai Yasa Kaunaivalu
- Born: 31 May 1969 (age 57) Lautoka, Fiji

Playing information
- Position: Fullback
Club
Years	Team	Pld	T	G	FG	P
	Lautoka
1995–96	Sheffield Eagles
	Total	0	0	0	0	0
Representative
Years	Team	Pld	T	G	FG	P
1995–96	Fiji	5	1	0	0	4

Malakai Yasa Kaunaivalu is a Fijian former professional rugby league footballer who represented Fiji at the 1995 World Cup. He started in all three of Fiji's matches at the tournament.

Following this tournament he signed with the Sheffield Eagles along with teammates Waisale Sovatabua and Joe Dakuitoga. Kaunaivalu spent two seasons at the Eagles. He played for Fiji against Australia during the Super League war. He later played one more test match for Fiji, against Great Britain in 1996.
