= David Reeka =

PNG international rugby league footballer

Personal information
- Born: Papua New Guinea

Playing information
Club
Years	Team	Pld	T	G	FG	P
	Lae Bombers
Representative
Years	Team	Pld	T	G	FG	P
1995	Papua New Guinea	1	0	0	0	0

David Reeka is a Papua New Guinean rugby league footballer who represented Papua New Guinea at the 1995 World Cup. He played in one match at the tournament, coming off the bench against Tonga.

Reeka later coached Tarangau in the Lae rugby league competition.
