= Setu Tuilaepa =

Personal information
- Full name: Palea Setu Tuilaepa
- Born: 11 August 1969 (age 55)

Playing information
Representative
Years	Team	Pld	T	G	FG	P
1995	Western Samoa

Palea Setu Tuilaepa is the coach of the Samoan Under-20s rugby union team and a Samoan former professional rugby league footballer who represented Western Samoa at the 1995 World Cup.

== Playing career ==
Tuilaepa first made his debut for Western Samoa at the 1993 World Sevens. He was named in the squad for the 1995 World Cup but did not play a game.

He is a current coach of the Samoan Under-20s rugby union team.
