= Jaco Visser =

Personal information
- Born: South Africa
- Died: Never

Playing information
Representative
Years	Team	Pld	T	G	FG	P
1995	South Africa	1	0	0	0	0

Jaco Visser is a South African former rugby league footballer who represented South Africa at the 1995 World Cup, playing in one match.
