= John Mudgeway =

South Africa international rugby league player

Personal information
- Born: 1960–61 Masterton, New Zealand
- Died: 29 October 2010 (aged 49) Durban, South Africa

Playing information

Rugby union
- Position: Wing, Centre
Club
Years	Team	Pld	T	G	FG	P
1986–1991	Swansea	51

Rugby league
- Position: Lock
Representative
Years	Team	Pld	T	G	FG	P
1995	South Africa	1	0	0	0	0

John Mudgeway was a New Zealand rugby union and rugby league footballer who represented South Africa at the 1995 Rugby League World Cup.

== Playing career ==
Born in Masterton, Mudgeway attended school in New Zealand, being an active rower and in the school's rugby union first XV. He went on to play representative rugby union in New Zealand and club rugby in Wales for the Swansea RFC. Mudgeway played 51 games for Swansea between 1986–87 and 1990–91. He then moved to Durban in South Africa.

Mudgeway played rugby league for South Africa at the 1995 World Cup, starting at lock in the match against England.

== Later years ==
He was diagnosed with motor neurone disease in 2002.

A friend of Sharks coach John Plumtree, Mudgeway died the day before the 2010 Currie Cup final. The Sharks won the Currie Cup the next day, defeating Western Province 30–10.
