= Andrew Ballot =

South Africa international rugby league footballer

Personal information
- Born: 27 May 1971 (age 54) South Africa

Playing information
- Position: Wing, Centre, Second-row
Club
Years	Team	Pld	T	G	FG	P
1996	Doncaster Dragons	19	7	0	0	28
1997	Batley Bulldogs
	Hunslet Hawks
	Total	19	7	0	0	28
Representative
Years	Team	Pld	T	G	FG	P
1995–97	South Africa	4	0	0	0	0

Andrew Ballot (born 27 May 1971) is a South African former rugby league footballer who represented South Africa at the 1995 World Cup.

== Playing career ==
Ballot played club football for Doncaster Dragons, Batley Bulldogs and Hunslet Hawks.

He played in all three matches for South Africa at the 1995 World Cup. In 1997 he played in a test match against France, and in the Super League World Nines.
