= Barend Alkema =

South African rugby league footballer

Personal information
- Born: South Africa

Playing information
- Position: Five-eighth, Halfback
Representative
Years	Team	Pld	T	G	FG	P
1995	South Africa	3	0	0	0	0

Barend Alkema is a South African former rugby league footballer who represented South Africa at the 1995 World Cup. He played in all three games in which they were involved.
