= Pascal Mons =

France international rugby league player

Personal information
- Born: France

Playing information
- Position: Wing, Centre
Club
Years	Team	Pld	T	G	FG	P
	AS Carcassonne
Representative
Years	Team	Pld	T	G	FG	P
1993–95	France	2	0	0	0	0
- Source: RLP

Pascal Mons is a French former professional rugby league footballer who represented France at the 1995 World Cup.

== Playing career ==
Mons played for AS Carcassonne and represented France between 1993 and 1995, including at the 1995 World Cup.
