= Edwin Ludic =

South Africa international rugby league player

Edwin Ludick
Personal information
- Born: South Africa

Playing information
Representative
Years	Team	Pld	T	G	FG	P
1995	South Africa	2	0	0	0	0

Edwin Ludick is a South African former rugby league footballer who represented South Africa at the 1995 World Cup.
