= Willem Boshoff (rugby league) =

South African rugby league footballer

Personal information
- Born: South Africa

Playing information
- Position: Centre
Representative
Years	Team	Pld	T	G	FG	P
1995	South Africa	3	0	0	0	0

Willem Boshoff is a South African rugby league former rugby league footballer who represented South Africa at the 1995 World Cup, playing in all three matches in which they were involved.
