= 1963 South Africa rugby league tour of Australia and New Zealand =

The 1963 South Africa rugby league tour of Australia and New Zealand was the first major overseas tour by a South African national rugby league side (often referred to as the Rugby League Springboks).

== Background ==
A 24-man squad that included several former rugby union Springboks undertook a 13-match tour. The side won four matches and lost nine. It lost both Tests to Australia but recorded a narrow 4–3 victory over New Zealand in Auckland (not counted as an official Test match as the South African squad contained a number of Australians who replaced South African players injured earlier in the tour).The tour followed three matches against Great Britain in South Africa in 1962 and was intended to establish regular international competition. Results were mixed; the team performed competitively in some fixtures but struggled against stronger Australian representative and Test sides. Rugby league activity in South Africa then largely lapsed for decades.

The tour was controversial with South Africa's government under apartheid. It attracted anti-South Africa protestors and demonstrations. When the South African team arrived in New Zealand the Canterbury Association for Racial Equality organised a group of around 40 demonstrators carrying antiapartheid placards and banners. Police were present as there had been similar demonstrations in Australia prior.

== Matches ==
7 July 1963
2:45pm

| Northern Division | 10–20 | South Africa |
|---|---|---|
| | Report |

Tamworth Oval, Tamworth
Attendance: 5,750
Referee: Keith Lyons

10 July 1963

| Monaro | 2–41 | South Africa |
|---|---|---|
| | Report |

Manuka Oval, Canberra
Attendance: 3,500
Referee: Jim Arnold

13 July 1963
2:45pm

| Sydney | 49–5 | South Africa |
|---|---|---|
| | Report |

Sydney Cricket Ground, Sydney
Attendance: 18,219
Referee: Darcy Lawler

16 July 1963

| Queensland | 32–18 | South Africa |
|---|---|---|
| | Report |

Brisbane Exhibition Ground, Brisbane
Attendance: 6,752
Referee: Henry Albert

20 July 1963
3:00pm

| Australia | 34–6 | South Africa |
|---|---|---|
| | Report |

Lang Park, Brisbane
Attendance: 10,210
Referee: Jack Bradley

24 July 1963

| South Queensland | 30–21 | South Africa |
|---|---|---|
| | Report |

Brisbane Exhibition Ground, Brisbane
Attendance: 2,187

27 July 1963
3:15pm

| Australia | 54–21 | South Africa |
|---|---|---|
| | Report |

Sydney Cricket Ground, Sydney
Attendance: 16,995
Referee: Jack Bradley

28 July 1963
2:45pm

| Newcastle | 27–17 | South Africa |
|---|---|---|
| | Report |

Newcastle Sports Ground, Newcastle
Attendance: 7,634
Referee: Ron Curtin

30 July 1963
3:20pm

| Parramatta | 39–18 | South Africa |
|---|---|---|
| | Report |

Cumberland Oval, Parramatta
Attendance: 5,372
Referee: Jack Bradley

1 August 1963

| Wellington | 12–21 | South Africa |
|---|---|---|
| | Report |

Basin Reserve, Wellington
Attendance: 3,000
Referee: Peter Yaxley

3 August 1963
3:00pm

| South Island | 12–8 | South Africa |
|---|---|---|
| | Report |

Addington Showgrounds, Christchurch
Attendance: 2,500
Referee: Earle Pilcher

7 August 1963

| Auckland | 10–4 | South Africa |
|---|---|---|
| | Report |

Carlaw Park, Auckland
Attendance: 4,500

10 August 1963

| New Zealand | 3–4 | South Africa |
|---|---|---|
| | Report |

Carlaw Park, Auckland
Referee: A. Payne

== Aftermath ==
Following the tour, it was thought that South Africa might debut at the scheduled 1965 Rugby League World Cup, especially after their non-test defeat of New Zealand by one point. However, the New Zealand Rugby League council did not yet support a World Cup entry from South Africa thinking them not ready and unable to draw sufficient spectator numbers.
