= Jaco Van Niekerk =

South Africa international rugby league footballer

Personal information
- Born: South Africa

Playing information
- Position: Prop
Representative
Years	Team	Pld	T	G	FG	P
1995	South Africa	2	0	0	0	0

Jaco Van Niekerk is an ex-South African Rugby League footballer.

== Career ==
Niekerk represented South Africa at the 1995 World Cup and participated in two matches.
