= Nico Serfontein =

Personal information
- Full name: Nicolas Serfontein
- Born: 16 October 1968 (age 56); South Africa

Playing information
Representative
Years	Team	Pld	T	G	FG	P
1995	South Africa	1	0	0	0	0

Nico Serfontein is a South African rugby football coach and former rugby league footballer who represented South Africa at the 1995 Rugby League World Cup.

== Playing career ==
Serfontein played rugby union as a Blue Bulls junior. Nico's main claim to fame in rugby league was his stint in the early nineties at Hemel Hempstead, a Hertfordshire-based club in England. In 1995 he played rugby league for South Africa at the 1995 World Cup.

== Coaching career ==
Serfontein later became a successful rugby union coach, coaching the Blue Bulls' Vodacom Cup and junior sides. While at the Bulls he won two Vodacom Cups, three Under-21 titles finals and two Under-19 titles.

In 2011, he was signed by the Golden Lions to run their junior programmes.

He has been involved with the Baby Boks under former coach Eric Sauls and at the 2012 IRB Junior World Championship.
