= Gideon Watts =

South Africa international rugby league player

Personal information
- Born: South Africa

Playing information
- Position: Prop
Representative
Years	Team	Pld	T	G	FG	P
1995	South Africa	3	1	0	0	4

Gideon Watts is a South African former rugby league footballer who represented South Africa at the 1995 World Cup, playing in all three matches in which they were involved and scoring a try their match against Australia.
