= Lucas Solbat =

PNG international rugby league footballer

Personal information
- Born: 15 September 1971 (age 53); Papua New Guinea

Playing information
- Position: Prop
Club
Years	Team	Pld	T	G	FG	P
	Rabaul Gurias
Representative
Years	Team	Pld	T	G	FG	P
1995–2000	Papua New Guinea	3	1	0	0	4

Lucas Solbat is a Papua New Guinean former professional rugby league footballer who represented Papua New Guinea national rugby league team in the 1995 and 2000 World Cups.

== Playing career ==
Solbat played for the Papua New Guinea side in both the 1995 and 2000 World Cups, scoring a try in the 1995 tournament.

Domestically, Solbat played for the Rabaul Gurias in the Papua New Guinea National Rugby League competition.
