= Apisalome Degei =

Fiji international rugby league footballer

Personal information
- Born: Fiji

Playing information
- Position: Second-row
Representative
| Years | Team | Pld | T | G | FG | P |
|---|---|---|---|---|---|---|
| 1995 | Fiji | 2 | 0 | 0 | 0 | 0 |
| 1996 | Fiji NRL | 1 | 0 | 0 | 0 | 0 |

Apisalome Degei is a Fijian former professional rugby league footballer who represented Fiji in the 1995 World Cup.

== Playing career ==
Degei played two matches at the 1995 World Cup.

Degei played for the side that represented the Fiji National Rugby League Competition in a test match against Australia in 1996 as part of the Super League war.

In 2007 he played in a rugby union sevens tournament in Western Sydney.
