= Robert Tela =

PNG international rugby league footballer

Personal information
- Born: Papua New Guinea

Playing information
- Position: Centre, Five-eighth
Club
Years	Team	Pld	T	G	FG	P
	Enga Mioks
Representative
Years	Team	Pld	T	G	FG	P
1995–1996	Papua New Guinea	4	0	2	0	4

Robert Tela is a Papua New Guinean rugby league footballer who represented Papua New Guinea at the 1995 World Cup.

== Playing career ==
Tela played for the Enga Mioks and represented Papua New Guinea in four tests between 1995 and 1996.

In 2011 he coached the Enga Tambuaks in the Highlands Zone Rugby Football League challenge.
