= Patrick Torreilles =

France international rugby league & union footballer (born 1969)

Personal information
- Born: 26 September 1969 (age 55); France

Playing information

Rugby league
- Position: Hooker
Club
Years	Team	Pld	T	G	FG	P
199?–??	SM Pia XIII
1996	Paris SG		1	25	0	54
1997–00	AS Saint-Estève
2000–02	Union Treiziste Catalane
20??–??	Salses
	Total	0	1	25	0	54
Representative
Years	Team	Pld	T	G	FG	P
1991–97	France	19	1	12	0	28

Rugby union
Club
Years	Team	Pld	T	G	FG	P
19??–??	USA Perpignan

Patrick Torreilles is a French rugby league footballer who represented France at the 1995 World Cup.

== Playing career ==
Torreilles played 19 tests for France between 1991 and 1997, including at the 1995 World Cup and the 1996 European Championship.

In 1996, he played for Paris Saint-Germain in the Super League competition.

He also played for France at the 1997 Super League World Nines.
