= Pierre Van Wyke =

South African rugby league footballer

Personal information
- Born: South Africa

Playing information
- Position: Fullback, Five-eighth
Club
Years	Team	Pld	T	G	FG	P
1996–?	Dewsbury Rams
Representative
Years	Team	Pld	T	G	FG	P
1995–2000	South Africa	6	0	4	0	8
- Source: Rugby League Project As of 31 May 2013

Pierre Van Wyke is a South African former professional rugby league footballer who represented South Africa in the 1995 and 2000 World Cups.

== Playing career ==
Van Wyke was attached to the Western Reds in Australia, although he never played a first grade match for the club. In 1995 he played for the South African Rhinos when they hosted a touring BARLA side. He was subsequently named in the squad for that year's World Cup and played in all three matches, starting at fullback.

In 1996 he spent the season at the Dewsbury Rams, along with several other South African World Cup players. Despite the hype surrounding their arrival, the imports failed to make a lasting impression at the club and returned home the following year.

He again played for South Africa in the 2000 World Cup, starting two matches at five eighth.
