= Una Taufa =

Tonga international rugby league player

Playing information
- Position: Wing
Representative
Years	Team	Pld	T	G	FG	P
1992–95	Tonga	7	5	0	0	20

Una Taufa is a former professional rugby league footballer who played in the 1990s. Una Taufa was a Tonga international and played at the 1995 Rugby League World Cup. During this competition, he was a member of the Canberra Raiders side.

Taufa played rugby union as a flanker for Ponsonby RFC before switching to rugby league in 1991, joining Wainuiomata. He helped the team win the National Club Competition in 1992.

In 1994, he played for the Auckland City Vulcans in the Lion Red Cup competition.
