= Ulaiasi Wainidroa =

Fiji international rugby league footballer

Personal information
- Born: Fiji

Playing information
- Position: Second-row
Representative
Years	Team	Pld	T	G	FG	P
1995–96	Fiji	5	1	0	0	4

Ulaiasi Wainidroa was a Fijian rugby league footballer who represented Fiji at the 1995 World Cup.
