= Pio Nakubuwai =

Former Fiji international rugby league footballer

Pio Kubuwai
Personal information
- Full name: Pio Nakubuwai
- Born: Fiji

Playing information
- Position: Prop
Representative
Years	Team	Pld	T	G	FG	P
1994–95	Fiji	6	1	0	0	4
- Source: As of 15 February 2021
- Relatives: Ben Nakubuwai (son)

Pio Nakubuwai was a Fijian rugby league footballer who represented Fiji at the 1995 World Cup.

== Playing career ==
Nakubuwai played for Fiji at the 1992 World Sevens.

Nakubuwai made his test debut in 1994, playing against France. He then appeared for Fiji at the 1995 World Cup, playing in all three matches.

Nakubuwai played for the Yanco Wamoon Hawks in the Group 20 Rugby League competition and later switched to rugby union, playing for the Leeton Phantoms.

== Personal life ==
His son, Ben who played for Melbourne Storm in the Holden Cup Under 20's team, played for the Leeton Phantoms under-13's and also played for the Group 20 Rugby League under 15's.
