= Samuela Davetawalu =

Fijian rugby league footballer

Personal information
- Born: Fiji

Playing information
- Position: Second-row
Representative
Years	Team	Pld	T	G	FG	P
1995	Fiji	1	0	0	0	0

Samuela Davetawalu is a Fijian former professional rugby league footballer who represented Fiji at the 1995 World Cup.

== Playing career ==
Davetawalu was selected for the Fijian squad for the 1995 World Cup. He played in one match, starting in the second row, against Australia.
