= Kiniviliame Koroibuleka =

Fijian former rugby footballer (born 1963)

Personal information
- Born: 11 December 1963 (age 62) Nasinu, Fiji
- Height: 185 cm (6 ft 1 in)
- Weight: 95 kg (14 st 13 lb)

Playing information
- Position: Wing
Representative
| Years | Team | Pld | T | G | FG | P |
|---|---|---|---|---|---|---|
| 1995 | Fiji | 1 | 0 | 0 | 0 | 0 |

Kiniviliame Koroibuleka is a Fijian former rugby footballer who represented Fiji in rugby league at the 1995 World Cup.

== Playing career ==
From Kinoya, Nasinu, Koroibuleka originally played rugby union for the Army. He was selected to represent Fiji in 1992, playing one game against Auckland.

Koroibuleka later switched codes and in 1995 was selected as part of the Fijian squad for that year's Rugby League World Cup.
