= Illiesa Toga =

Fiji international rugby league footballer

Personal information
- Full name: Illiesa Toga
- Born: 29 November 1965 (age 59)

Playing information
- Position: Wing, Second-row
Club
Years	Team	Pld	T	G	FG	P
1994	Western Suburbs	1	0	0	0	0
Representative
Years	Team	Pld	T	G	FG	P
1994–1995	Fiji	3	1	0	0	4
- Source: As of 16 October 2019

Illiesa Toga is a Fijian former professional rugby league footballer who represented Fiji in the 1995 World Cup.

== Playing career ==
In 1994 Toga played one match for the Western Suburbs club in the NSWRL Premiership. At the end of the year he played for Fiji against France.

In 1995 he was selected by Fiji for the 1995 World Cup. He played in two matches at the tournament.
