= James Kops =

PNG international rugby league footballer

Personal information
- Born: Papua New Guinea

Playing information
- Position: Wing
Representative
Years	Team	Pld	T	G	FG	P
1995–2001	Papua New Guinea	6	0	0	0	0

James Kops is a Papua New Guinean rugby league footballer who represented Papua New Guinea at the 1995 World Cup.

== Playing career ==
From the Hagen Eagles club, Kops first played for Papua New Guinea in 1995 at the World Cup. He went on to play in six test matches, his last in 2001.

In 2001 he moved clubs, joining the Enga Mioks.
