= Tauʻalupe Liku =

Tonga international rugby league footballer

Personal information
- Full name: Tauʻalupe Oko Liku
- Born: 21 February 1971 (age 54); Tonga

Playing information
- Position: Prop, Second-row
Club
Years	Team	Pld	T	G	FG	P
1994–99	Leigh Centurions	121	27	0	0	108
1999–00	Workington Town
2001–04	Barrow Raiders
2005	Swinton Lions
	Total	121	27	0	0	108
Representative
Years	Team	Pld	T	G	FG	P
1995	Tonga	1	1	0	0	4

Tauʻalupe Oko Liku ("Tau") is a Tongan former professional rugby league footballer who represented Tonga at the 1995 World Cup.

Tau Liku came over to England in 1994 to play for Leigh Centurions and became one of three overseas players to make over 100 appearances for the Centurions. In 1995, Liku went on to represent Tonga in their very first Rugby League World Cup appearance and scored in that World Cup vs. Papua New Guinea. He enjoyed stints for Cumbrian sides Workington Town and Barrow Raiders before returning to play for Swinton Lions. In 2005, due to family reasons, Liku retired from rugby league. He resides still in Leigh with his wife and two children.
