= Mark Perrett =

Wales international rugby league footballer

Personal information
- Full name: Mark Perrett
- Born: 3 August 1973 (age 52) Halifax, England
- Height: 6 ft 3 in (1.91 m)
- Weight: 15 st 13 lb (101 kg)

Playing information
- Position: Second-row, Loose forward
Club
Years	Team	Pld	T	G	FG	P
1991–97	Halifax		15	0	0	60
1999	Oldham	15	1	0	0	4
	Total	15	16	0	0	64
Representative
Years	Team	Pld	T	G	FG	P
1994–96	Wales	7	0	0	0	0
- Source: As of 1 January 2017

Mark Perrett (born 18 July 1973) is a former Wales internaterional rugby league footballer who played in the 1990s. He played at representative level for Wales, and at club level for Halifax and Oldham, as a second-row, or loose forward.

== Background ==
Perrett was born in Halifax, West Riding of Yorkshire, England, he has Welsh ancestors, and eligible to play for Wales due to the grandparent rule.

== International career ==
Perrett played for Wales at the 1995 Rugby League World Cup.
