= Orisi Cavuilati =

Fiji international rugby league footballer

Personal information
- Full name: Ratu Orisi Cavuilati
- Born: 4 December 1962 (age 63) Nausori, Tailevu Province, Fiji

Playing information
- Position: Wing
Club
Years	Team	Pld	T	G	FG	P
1995	Sydney Bulldogs	1	0	0	0	0
Representative
Years	Team	Pld	T	G	FG	P
1994–1995	Fiji	2	0	0	0	0

Ratu Orisi Cavuilati is a Fijian former professional rugby league footballer who represented Fiji at the 1995 World Cup.

== Playing career ==
Cavuilati signed for the Sydney Bulldogs in 1995 from Fijian rugby union. He was a regular in the Bulldogs reserve grade and was selected for the Fijian national squad for the 1995 World Cup.

In 2003, Cavuilati received a bravery award for punching an armed bank robber to the ground.
