= Phil Howlett =

Tonga international rugby league footballer

Personal information
- Full name: Phillip Howlett
- Born: 16 January 1975 (age 51) Tonga

Playing information
- Position: Centre, Five-eighth
Club
Years	Team	Pld	T	G	FG	P
1993	Penrith Panthers	1	0	0	0	0
1994–95	Parramatta Eels	25	6	0	0	24
1996–98	South Sydney	45	12	0	0	48
1999	Bradford Bulls	6	2	0	0	8
	Total	77	20	0	0	80
Representative
Years	Team	Pld	T	G	FG	P
1995–00	Tonga	6	1	0	0	4
1997	Rest of the World	1	0	0	0	0

Phil Howlett (born 16 January 1975) is a Tonga-born Australia-raised former professional rugby league footballer who played in the 1990s and 2000s. He played at representative level Tonga, as a centre or five-eighth.

== Background ==
Howlett was born in Tonga.

While attending John Paul II College in 1993, Howlett played schoolboy representative rugby league for Australia.

He is the brother of All Black Doug Howlett.

== Playing career ==
Howlett played first grade premiership football for the Penrith Panthers, Parramatta Eels and South Sydney Rabbitohs in Australia before joining the Bradford Bulls in the Super League.

== Representative career ==
Howlett played for the Tonga national rugby league team at the 1995 and 2000 World Cups.

During the Super League war Howlett played for the Australian Rugby League's "Rest of the World" side.
