= Jioji Vatubua =

Fijian rugby footballer

Personal information
- Born: Fiji

Playing information

Rugby union
- Position: Centre
Representative
Years	Team	Pld	T	G	FG	P
1992	Fiji	1	0	0	0	0

Rugby league
Representative
Years	Team	Pld	T	G	FG	P
1995	Fiji	3	0	0	0	0

Jioji Vatubua is a Fijian rugby footballer who represented Fiji in rugby league at the 1995 World Cup.

Vatubua also played for Fiji in rugby union, playing in one test match in 1992.
