= Nick Pinkney =

England international rugby league footballer

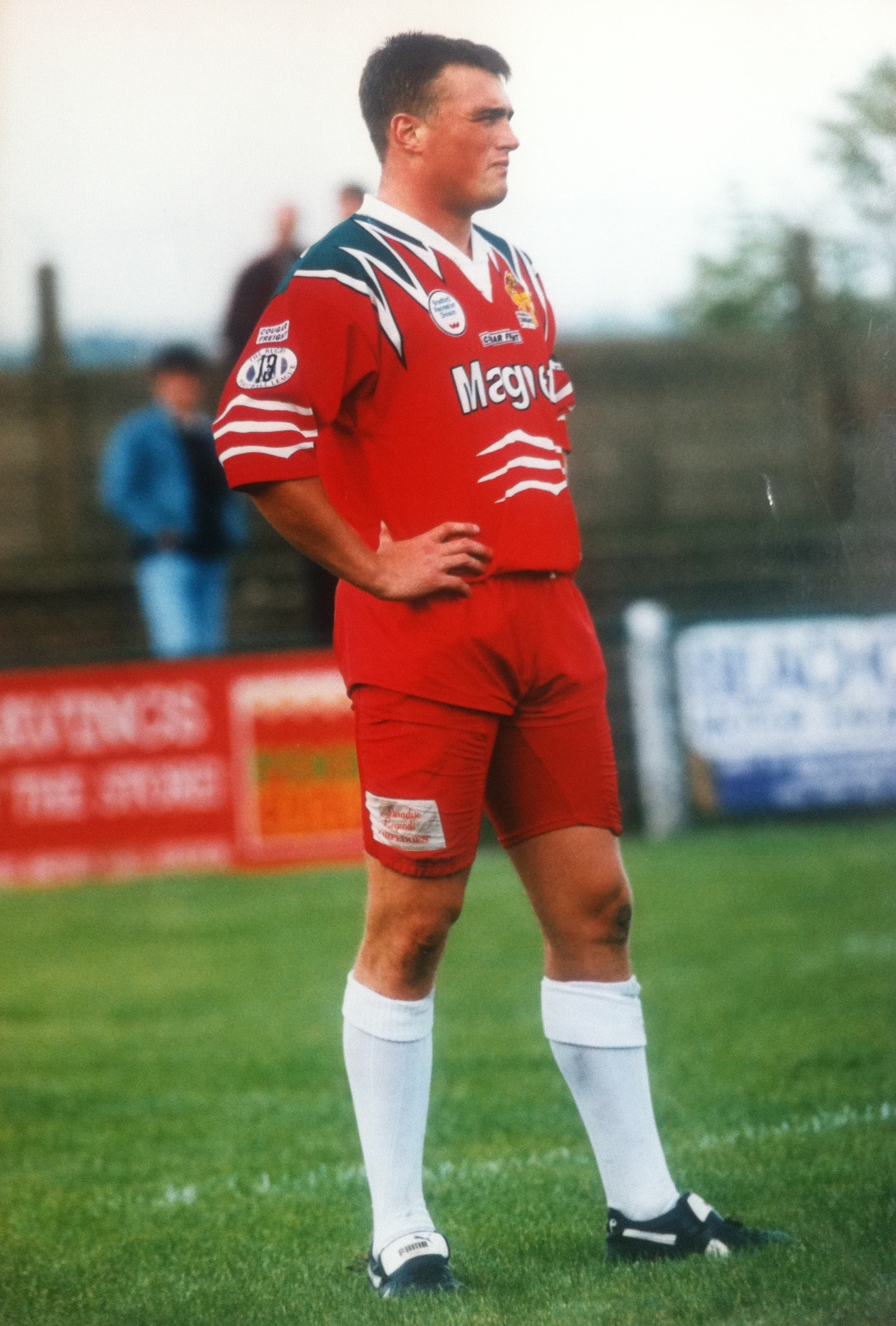

Personal information
- Born: 6 December 1970 (age 55)

Playing information
- Position: Wing
Club
Years	Team	Pld	T	G	FG	P
1989–93	Ryedale-York
1993–96	Keighley Cougars	103	101	0	0	404
1997–98	Sheffield Eagles	46	24	0	0	96
1999	Halifax	29	14	0	0	56
2000–02	Salford City Reds	69	32	0	0	128
2002–04	Hull Kingston Rovers	62	30	0	0	120
	Total	309	201	0	0	804
Representative
Years	Team	Pld	T	G	FG	P
1995	England	4	3	0	0	12

Nick Pinkney (born 6 December 1970) is an English former professional rugby league footballer who played as a winger and stand-off in the 1980s, 1990s and 2000s. He played at representative level for England, and at club level for Ryedale-York, the Keighley Cougars, the Sheffield Eagles, Halifax, the Salford City Reds and Hull Kingston Rovers.

== Career ==
=== Club career ===
Pinkney started his professional career at Ryedale-York, scoring a try on his debut against Chorley Borough in November 1989. He was signed by Keighley Cougars in 1993 for a fee of £40,000. While at the Keighley Cougars, Pinkney scored over 100 tries, and broke the club record for most tries in a season twice in consecutive seasons. In 1997, he joined Sheffield Eagles. Pinkney played and scored a try in Sheffield Eagles' 17–8 victory over Wigan in the 1998 Challenge Cup Final at Wembley Stadium, London on Saturday 2 May 1998.

In May 2000, Pinkney scored his 200th career try in a 20–38 defeat against Halifax.

=== Representative career ===
Pinkney was an England international and played at the 1995 Rugby League World Cup. He was selected for England in the 1995 World Cup Final on the reserve bench but did not play as Australia won the match and retained the Cup.
