= Simon Haughton =

Great Britain and England international rugby league footballer

Personal information
- Full name: Simon James Haughton
- Born: 10 November 1975 (age 50) Bingley, West Yorkshire, England

Playing information

Rugby league
- Position: Second-row
Club
Years	Team	Pld	T	G	FG	P
1993–02	Wigan Warriors	174	55	0	0	220
2005	Oldham	14	7	0	0	28
	Total	188	62	0	0	248
Representative
Years	Team	Pld	T	G	FG	P
1995–99	England	6	2	0	0	8
1997–98	Great Britain	5	2	0	0	8

Rugby union
Club
Years	Team	Pld	T	G	FG	P
2002–04	Orrell

Simon James Haughton (born 10 November 1975) is an English former professional rugby league and rugby union footballer who played as a second-row forward in the 1990s and 2000s. He played representative level rugby league for Great Britain and England, and at club level for the Wigan Warriors and Oldham RLFC, and club level rugby union for Orrell R.U.F.C..

== Early life ==
Haughton was born in Bingley, West Yorkshire, England, and attended Bingley Grammar School. He grew up playing rugby league for amateur club Dudley Hill, signing a professional contract with Wigan on his 17th birthday.

Haughton earned a mention in the 1992 Guinness Book of Records for scoring the most tries(132) in a single amateur Rugby League season, including 9 in one game with the Bingley Amateur Rugby League club in West Yorkshire, UK.

In 1999 the Yorkshireman’s significance and achievements in rugby league were recognised by publisher Debrett’s and he was included in the 1999 edition of their publication Debrett’s People of Today.

== Playing career ==
=== Club career ===
Haughton made his debut in November 1993 in the second round of the 1993–94 Regal Trophy, scoring a try in a 22–8 win against Whitehaven.

He appeared as a substitute in the 1995 Premiership final, scoring a try in the 69–12 win over Leeds.

Haughton played loose forward in Wigan's 25–16 victory over St Helens in the 1995–96 Regal Trophy Final at Alfred McAlpine Stadium, Huddersfield on Saturday 13 January 1996.

He played for Wigan Warriors from the interchange bench in their 1998 Super League Grand Final victory over Leeds Rhinos.

In July 2002, Haughton switched codes to sign for rugby union side Orrell. He returned to rugby league in December 2004, signing for Oldham.

=== International honours ===
Haughton was an England international and debuted for the team at the 1995 Rugby League World Cup, making four appearances during the tournament. He made two further appearances for England in 1999 against France. He was also selected for the 2000 World Cup, but withdrew from the squad.

In the 1997 post-season Haughton was selected to play for Great Britain in the Super League Test series against Australia, scoring two tries in the third and deciding match.

== Post-playing ==
After retiring from rugby, Haughton emigrated to Australia with his wife and two children.
