= Justin Jennings (rugby league) =

South African rugby league footballer

Personal information
- Born: South Africa

Playing information
- Position: Hooker
Representative
Years	Team	Pld	T	G	FG	P
1995–2000	South Africa	4	0	0	0	0

Justin Jennings is a South African former professional rugby league footballer who represented South Africa in the 1995 and 2000 World Cups.

== Playing career ==
A Hooker, Jennings was first selected to play for South Africa at the 1995 World Cup, where he made one appearance from the bench. In 1997 he played for the South African nines side at the World Nines tournament.

In 2000 he was again selected as part of South Africa's World Cup squad. He played in three matches, including starting a match against France.
