= Nik Kosef =

Australia international rugby league player

Personal information
- Born: 6 June 1974 (age 52) Cobar, New South Wales, Australia

Playing information
- Height: 188 cm (6 ft 2 in)
- Weight: 98 kg (15 st 6 lb)
- Position: Lock, Second-row, Five-eighth
Club
Years	Team	Pld	T	G	FG	P
1992–99	Manly Sea Eagles	130	14	0	0	56
2000–02	Northern Eagles	28	3	0	0	12
	Total	158	17	0	0	68
Representative
Years	Team	Pld	T	G	FG	P
1997–99	New South Wales	8	1	0	0	4
1995–99	Australia	10	1	0	0	4

Nik Kosef (born 6 June 1974) is an Australian former professional rugby league footballer who played as a lock, five-eighth and second-row forward in the 1990s and 2000s. He was a state and international representative whose club career was spent with the Manly-Warringah Sea Eagles and the Northern Eagles.

== Club career ==
Kosef made his first-grade debut for Manly in a round 18 match of 1992 against the Penrith Panthers. He played for the club and its related successor the Northern Eagles for eleven consecutive seasons although his last three years were interrupted by injury.

He was a member of Manly's premiership winning side of season 1996 as well as the teams which lost the Grand Finals in 1995 and 1997 to Canterbury and Newcastle respectively.

Four knee injuries limited his appearances at the Northern Eagles to just ten games during the 2000 and 2001 seasons. Kosef made his return to the team in 2002 after sorting out a contract dispute with the club. Kosef accepted a pay-out from Manly for the final year of his contract, and he retired at the end of 2002.

== Representative career ==
Kosef first represented for the New South Wales Blues at lock in game I of the 1997 State of Origin series at the time when the game was divided by the Super League war. He held his position in all three games that year. He played in two games in the 1998 series and was in the run-on side in all three games of 1999 at lock and second-row.

Kosef made his international representative debut for Australia in the 1995 World Cup in the group match against South Africa and played in three matches in that tournament. He played in the 1996 Test against Papua New Guinea. He represented in one Test against New Zealand in 1998, in the Anzac Test of 1999 and in all three matches played against New Zealand and Great Britain in the 1999 Tri-Nations series.

== Post playing ==
Since retiring from rugby league, Kosef is a publican in Queensland.
