= Fili Seru =

Fijian rugby footballer (1970–2026)

Personal information
- Born: 11 March 1970 Colony of Fiji
- Died: 6 May 2026 (aged 56)

Playing information
- Height: 178 cm (5 ft 10 in)
- Weight: 77 kg (12 st 2 lb)

Rugby union
- Position: Wing
Representative
Years	Team	Pld	T	G	FG	P
1990–93	Fiji	10	4	0	0	16

Rugby league
- Position: Wing
Club
Years	Team	Pld	T	G	FG	P
1995	South Queensland Crushers	10	2	0	0	8
1996–97	Illawarra Steelers	20	4	0	0	16
1998–99	Hull FC	42	15	0	0	60
	Total	72	21	0	0	84
Representative
Years	Team	Pld	T	G	FG	P
1995	Fiji	4	2	0	0	8

Fili Seru (11 March 1970 – 6 May 2026) was a Fijian rugby footballer who represented Fiji in the 1991 Rugby Union World Cup and the 1995 Rugby League World Cup.

== Rugby union career ==
Seru played rugby union and represented Fiji in ten tests between 1990 and 1993, including at the 1991 Rugby World Cup.

== Rugby league career ==
Seru then switched to rugby league and played for the South Queensland Crushers in 1995, as well as playing in four test matches for Fiji, including three at the 1995 Rugby League World Cup.

He then played for the Illawarra Steelers for two years before he moved to England and joined Hull FC.

== Death ==
Seru died from complications of motor neuron disease on 6 May 2026, at the age of 56.
