= Noa Nayacakalou =

Fijian rugby league footballer

Personal information
- Full name: Noa Nayacakalou
- Born: Fiji

Playing information
- Position: Five-eighth
Representative
Years	Team	Pld	T	G	FG	P
1993–95	Fiji	6	3	9	0	30

Noa Nayacakalou is a former Fijian rugby league footballer who represented Fiji at the 1995 World Cup.

He played four tests for Fiji between 1994 and 1995 while in the lower grades with the Penrith Panthers.
