= Ian Sagaitu =

Fiji international rugby league footballer

Personal information
- Born: 1972 (age 53–54) Fiji

Playing information
- Position: Hooker, Second-row
Representative
Years	Team	Pld	T	G	FG	P
1995–1996	Fiji	4	1	0	0	4

Ian Sagaitu is a Fijian former professional rugby league footballer who represented Fiji at the 1995 World Cup, playing in all three matches at the tournament.
