= Joe Dakuitoga =

Fiji international rugby league footballer & national coach

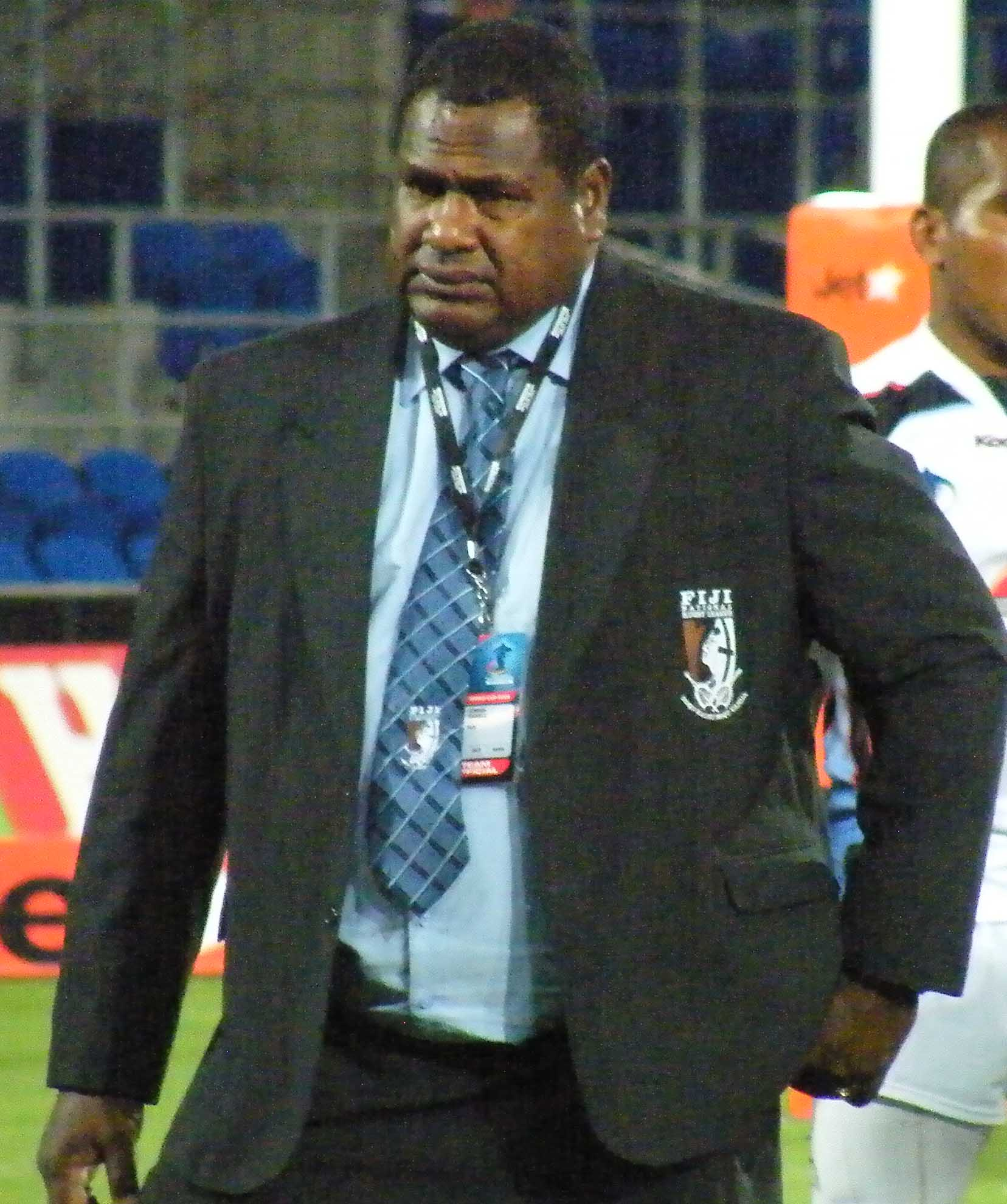
- Dakuitoga at the 2008 World Cup

Personal information
- Full name: Josaia Rabele Dakuitoga
- Born: 25 September 1965 (age 60) Suva, Fiji

Playing information
- Position: Wing, Second-row
Club
Years	Team	Pld	T	G	FG	P
1994–95	Penrith Panthers	7	1	0	0	4
1995–96	Sheffield Eagles	19	2	0	0	8
	Total	26	3	0	0	12
Representative
Years	Team	Pld	T	G	FG	P
1995–96	Fiji	4	1	0	0	4

Coaching information
Representative
Years	Team	Gms	W	D	L	W%
2007–08	Fiji	5	3	0	2	60
2011	Fiji	2	1	0	1	50
2022	Fiji	5	2	0	3	40
2023–25	Fiji women	5	3	0	2	60
- Source: As of 3 September 2026

Josaia "Joe" Rabele Dakuitoga (born 25 September 1965) is a Fijian professional rugby league coach and former player.

In his playing career, Dakuitoga was a founding member of the Fiji men's national team at the 1992 Rugby League World Sevens. He played for the Penrith Panthers and the Sheffield Eagles, and represented Fiji at the 1995 World Cup.

Dakuitoga was the head coach of the Fijian men's team at the 2008 and 2022 World Cups, and head coach of the Fijian women's team during their successful qualification tournament for the 2026 Women's Rugby League World Cup.

== Playing career ==
Dakuitoga played for the Penrith Panthers in the NSWRL Premiership, playing in seven matches between 1994 and 1995. He was selected for the Fijian squad in the 1995 World Cup. Following this tournament he signed with the Sheffield Eagles along with teammates Waisale Sovatabua and Malakai Yasa Kaunaivalu. Dakuitoga spent two seasons at the Eagles.

== Coaching career ==
While coaching the Nadera Panthers in the Fiji National Rugby League competition Dakuitoga was appointed the domestic national coach in 2007. In 2008 he took the Fijian squad to the 2008 World Cup as head coach.

In August 2020, Dakuitoga was appointed head coach of Fiji ahead of the 2021 World Cup.

Dakuitoga was appointed Director of Coaching at Griffith Waratahs in the Group 20 Rugby League competition in 2023.

In September 2023, Dakuitoga was appointed as head coach of the Fiji women's team. In October 2025, Dakuitoga coached the team to qualify for the 2026 Women's Rugby League World Cup.
