= Savenaca Taga =

Fiji international rugby league footballer

Personal information
- Born: Fiji

Playing information
- Position: Halfback
Representative
Years	Team	Pld	T	G	FG	P
1995–1996	Fiji	4	1	6	0	16

Savenaca Taga is a Fijian former professional rugby league footballer who represented Fiji at the 1995 World Cup.

== Playing career ==
Taga was selected for Fiji for the 1995 World Cup and played in all three matches. In 1996, he played for Fiji against Australia during the Super League war.
