= Kaleveti Naisoro =

Fiji dual-code international rugby footballer

Personal information
- Born: 14 February 1969 (age 57) Fiji

Playing information
- Height: 5 ft 6 in (168 cm)
- Weight: 176 lb (80 kg)

Rugby union
- Position: Centre
Representative
| Years | Team | Pld | T | G | FG | P |
|---|---|---|---|---|---|---|
| 1991 | Fiji | 5 | 2 | 0 | 0 | 8 |

Rugby league
- Position: Wing, Halfback
Club
| Years | Team | Pld | T | G | FG | P |
|---|---|---|---|---|---|---|
| 1995 | Parramatta Eels | 3 | 0 | 0 | 0 | 0 |
Representative
| Years | Team | Pld | T | G | FG | P |
| 1994–00 | Fiji | 6 | 1 | 0 | 0 | 4 |

Kaleveti Naisoro (or Kalaveti Naisoro) is a Fijian dual-code international rugby union and professional rugby league footballer who played in the 1990s and 2000s. He played representative rugby union (RU) for Fiji, including at the 1991 Rugby World Cup, and representative rugby league (RL) for Fiji, including at the 1995 Rugby League World Cup and 2000 Rugby League World Cup.

== Playing career ==
Naisoro originally played rugby union. In 1991 he played in six games for Fiji, including five test matches. He played in two matches at the 1991 Rugby World Cup.

Naisoro then switched to rugby league and played in six test matches for Fiji between 1994 and 2000. He was included in the Fijian squads for both the 1995 and 2000 World Cups.

In 1995 Naisoro spent the season with the Parramatta Eels and played in three first grade matches. By 2003 he had returned to Fiji, playing for the Lautoka club. He participated in the 1997 Super League World Nines.

In 2002 he played for a Fiji XIII against the touring England A side.
