= Samuela Marayawa =

Fiji international rugby league footballer

Personal information
- Born: Fiji

Playing information
- Position: Centre, Second-row
Representative
Years	Team	Pld	T	G	FG	P
1994–00	Fiji	6	2	0	0	8

Samuela Marayawa is a Fijian rugby league footballer who represented Fiji in the 1995 and 2000 World Cups.

== Playing career ==
Marayawa played in six matches for Fiji between 1994 and 2000, making his debut against France in Suva in 1994. He went on to be part of both the 1995 and 2000 World Cup squads. In 2001 he played in the Country Rugby League competition for Ourimbah.
