= Waisale Sovatabua =

Fiji international rugby league footballer

Personal information
- Born: 26 June 1973 (age 53) Fiji

Playing information
- Height: 168 cm (5 ft 6 in)
- Weight: 109 kg (17 st 2 lb)
- Position: Fullback, Wing, Centre
Club
Years	Team	Pld	T	G	FG	P
1995–99	Sheffield Eagles	89	24	0	1	97
2000	Huddersfield Giants	25	8	0	0	32
2001–03	Wakefield Trinity Wildcats	54	25	0	0	100
2005–06	Sheffield Eagles	24	11	0	0	44
	Total	192	68	0	1	273
Representative
Years	Team	Pld	T	G	FG	P
1995–00	Fiji	7	3	0	0	12

Waisale Sovatabua (born 26 June 1973) is a Fijian former professional rugby league footballer who played as a fullback, wing or centre in the 1990s and 2000s. He played at representative level for Fiji, and at club level for the Sheffield Eagles, Huddersfield Giants and the Wakefield Trinity Wildcats in the Super League. He hails from the highland province of Namosi [village of Navunikabi] on Viti Levu with maternal links to the village of Ketei, Totoya, Lau archipelago.

== Playing career ==
=== Club career ===
Waisale Sovatabua played fullback in Sheffield Eagles' 17–8 victory over Wigan in the 1998 Challenge Cup Final during Super League III at Wembley Stadium, London on Saturday 2 May 1998.

In 2003, he switched to rugby union, playing for Otley, before returning to rugby league and finishing career with a second spell at Sheffield Eagles.

=== International career ===
He was a Fijian international and played at the 1995 and 2000 Rugby League World Cups.
