= South Africa national rugby league team =

Rugby league football team that represents South Africa

South Africa

Team information
- Nickname: The Rhinos
- Governing body: South African Rugby League
- Region: Middle East-Africa
- Head coach: Darryl Fisher
- Captain: Kamren Cryer and Coby Thomas
- Home stadium: Brakpan Stadium
- IRL ranking: 29th

Uniforms
First colours

Team results
- First international
- Great Britain 49 – 30 South Africa (Durban, South Africa; 23 August 1962)
- Biggest win
- Brazil 0 – 82 South Africa (Noosa, Australia; 5 June 2022)
- Biggest defeat
- Australia 86 – 6 South Africa (Gateshead, England; 10 October 1995)
- World Cup
- Appearances: 2 (first time in 1995)
- Best result: Group stage, 1995, 2000

The South Africa national rugby league team to date have competed at two Rugby League World Cups in 1995 and 2000.

South Africa traditionally play in a predominately green uniform with black shorts, they have commonly been referred to as The Rhinos since the early 1990s. The South African emblem is a red and yellow King Protea plant which is the national flower of South Africa. South African internationals are played at a variety of venues throughout the country with no singular home ground being used.

== History ==
Rugby league first gained attention in South Africa when the English and French attempted expansion in the 1950s for the purpose of creating further international opposition. Three games were then played between the two nations on the continent but both sides viewed the matches as nothing more than friendly fixtures so never undertook the games in a serious manner and the public never subsequently took to the three exhibition games. Though rugby league was only seriously played in South Africa beginning in the 1950s, the sport was not unknown to South Africans prior to that decade; for example, a number of notable black and Coloured rugby union players, such as David Barends, Green Vigo, and Enslin Dlambulo, code-switched from union to league and moved overseas, in part because of the allure of professionalism, while also escaping the apartheid regime.

Over the next several years, rugby league lay dormant in South Africa and it was not until the 1960s when talks of creating a national side began. After much discussion within South Africa, it was eventually agreed for a national side to play a touring Great Britain and then undertake a tour of Australasia. The first South African national side played their first competitive fixture on 23 August 1962 and put on a good showing against the much stronger British but eventually lost by nineteen points 49–30. The following two fixtures turned out to be much the same with the South Africans being defeated on another two occasions but putting in good performances whilst never being comprehensively beaten. The South Africans embarked on their first tour eleven months later with a twenty-four-man squad that included several former Springboks. The tour started with several friendly fixtures against various minor representative sides where they gained two comfortable victories; the first international fixture of the tour took place in Brisbane against the world champion Australians and the South Africans performed with courage but eventually lost the match 34–6. The following test was played a week later in Sydney that again saw the team put in a tough effort but lost again 54–21. South Africa left Australia without an international win and be low on confidence heading to New Zealand to play a sole fixture against the New Zealand national side whom were expected to win comfortably. However, the match turned out to be a tough encounter and surprisingly saw the team gain its first international victory 4–3 The South Africans featured several Australian players bought in to cover injuries and improve the quality of the side and so the match against New Zealand is not counted as a test match.

After this first string of international fixtures the South Africans became disheartened after only winning four of the thirteen tour matches and rugby league again lay dormant for decades.

The Rugby League World Cup tournament had been scheduled to be held in Australia and New Zealand in 1965, this time with the inclusion of the South African team. However the tournament was abandoned.

The early 1990s saw new South African administrators begin to rebuild the international facet of South African rugby. During 1992, the South African national side again played for the first time in years against several combined African representative teams and the following years saw things look more promising for the Africans with their qualification into the 1995 World Cup and more regularity in international fixtures. Their first World Cup saw the South Africans seeded into the toughest group of the competition containing Australia, England and Fiji. The South Africans found their three group matches extremely difficult and failed to win a match during the tournament.

The following years saw the South Africans play on an inconsistent basis against several touring sides and qualify for their second consecutive World Cup in 2000. Leading into the tournament they were hopeful of gaining their first Cup win after being drawn into an easier yet still competitive group with France, Papua New Guinea and Tonga. After initial optimism leading into the competition the South Africans faced Tonga in their first world cup fixture and be comprehensively beaten 66–18. The following world cup matches added further disappointment and diminish all optimism the South Africans originally had with further heavy losses to both Papua New Guinea and the French.

After a second disappointing World Cup the side again began playing irregularly with one off fixtures over the next several years and it was not until 2006 when they again undertook another tour. A tour to Italy was undertaken in June 2006, which saw the South Africans play in two tests and a nines competition in Montelanico.

In 2008, the South Africa Rhinos were scheduled to participate in the 2008 Rugby League World Cup Qualifiers in the Atlantic pool also featuring the USA, Japan and the West Indies. The winner of the tournament entered into the repecharge round for the chance to qualify for the 2008 Rugby League World Cup. South Africa withdrew alongside the West Indies due to financial reasons, leaving the tournament as a one off fixture between the US and Japan. As a result of their withdrawal South Africa forfeited the opportunity to qualify for the World Cup.

In 2011 however, the South Africa national rugby league team participated in the Atlantic Qualification Tournament as part of the 2013 Rugby League World Cup Qualifiers. The winner of the tournament qualified for the 2013 Rugby League World Cup that is to be held in England and Wales. Despite beating Canada 36–22 in a warm-up match before the beginning of the tournament, South Africa nevertheless lost to USA 40–4 in the opening match of the tournament.

In 2015 South Africa were confirmed to take on Lebanon in a one-off 2017 Rugby League World Cup qualifier in Dubai, United Arab Emirates. However the match was shifted to a two match playoff in Pretoria, South Africa due to a controversial arrest of the leader of UAE rugby league who was in charge of organizing the initial match at the Dubai Sports City complex.

== Current squad ==
Squad announced for the 2026 World Cup qualification playoff against Cook Islands in November 2025.

Player	Club
Jason Smith	(Australia) Central Charlestown Butcher Boys
Karyn Cryer	(Australia) Corrimal Cougars
Keegan Turner	(Australia) Currumbin Eagles
Reilly Canning	(Australia) Eastwood
Bevan de Vries	(Australia) Forrestville Ferrets
Marcelle Corneelsen	(South Africa) Grizzles
Niel Beukes	(South Africa) Harlequins
Ethan Sweet	(Australia) Mackay Cutters
Brynn du Rand	(Australia) Mackay Magpies
Brady McMillan	(Australia) Moranbah Miners
Ashley Bull	(Australia) Normanby Hounds
Shane Mackenzie	(Australia) North Beach Sea Eagles
Kalum Gulliver-Brown	(Australia) North Beach Sea Eagles
Coby Thomas	(Australia) North Sydney Bears
Callum McMenemy	(Australia) Parramatta Eels
Luke de Vlieg	(Australia) Runaway Bay
Kobe Martin	(Australia) South Logan Magpies
Aden Perry	(Australia) St Mary’s Saints
Joshua Hill	(Australia) Fortitude Valley Diehards

== Competitive Record ==
- Below is a list of test matches played by the South Africa XIII up until 13 November 2023.

Country	Matches	Won	Drawn	Lost	Win%	For	Aga	Diff
Australia	3	0	0	3	0%	33	174	–141
Brazil	1	1	0	0	100%	82	0	+82
Canada	1	1	0	0	100%	36	22	+14
Cook Islands	1	0	0	1	0%	6	66	–60
England	1	0	0	1	0%	0	46	–46
Fiji	1	0	0	1	0%	6	52	–46
France	2	0	0	2	0%	23	86	–63
Great Britain	3	0	0	3	0%	86	133	–47
Italy	4	2	0	2	50%	164	94	+70
Jamaica	1	0	0	1	0%	6	20	–16
Kenya	2	2	0	0	100%	138	14	+124
Lebanon	2	0	0	2	0%	28	90	–62
Malta	1	1	0	0	100%	30	24	+6
New Zealand	1	1	0	0	100%	4	3	+1
Niue	3	0	0	3	0%	26	142	–116
Papua New Guinea	1	0	0	1	0%	0	16	–16
Philippines	2	2	0	0	100%	104	42	+62
Poland	1	1	0	0	100%	38	16	+22
Russia	2	0	0	2	0%	45	52	–7
Tonga	1	0	0	1	0%	18	66	–48
United States	1	0	0	1	0%	4	40	–36
Wales	1	0	0	1	0%	12	40	–28
West Indies	1	0	0	1	0%	22	50	–28
Total	37	11	0	26	29.73%	911	1288	–377

=== Results ===
Matches marked with a † are not full internationals test match and thus do not count towards international statistics and ranking points.
Common reasons for games not classifying as test matches are because the opponent is not a member of the IRL or is not the senior first team of a member nation, or the game was played with modified rules.

Date	Team 1	Score	Team 2	Competition	Venue	Attendance	Ref.
23 August 1962	South Africa	30–49	Great Britain	1962 Great Britain Lions tour	(South Africa) Pretoria	Unknown	
25 August 1962	South Africa	33–39	Great Britain	1962 Great Britain Lions tour	(South Africa) Durban	Unknown	
31 August 1962	South Africa	23–45	Great Britain	1962 Great Britain Lions tour	(South Africa) Johannesburg	Unknown	
7 July 1963	Northern Division	20–10 †	South Africa	1963 South Africa Rhinos tour	(Australia) Tamworth	Unknown	
10 July 1963	Monaro	2–41 †	South Africa	1963 South Africa Rhinos tour	(Australia) Canberra	Unknown	
13 July 1963	Sydney	49–5 †	South Africa	1963 South Africa Rhinos tour	(Australia) Sydney	Unknown	
16 July 1963	Queensland	32–18 †	South Africa	1963 South Africa Rhinos tour	(Australia) Brisbane	Unknown	
20 July 1963	Australia	34–6	South Africa	1963 South Africa Rhinos tour	(Australia) Lang Park, Brisbane	10,210	
24 July 1963	South Queensland	30–21 †	South Africa	1963 South Africa Rhinos tour	(Australia) Brisbane	Unknown	
27 July 1963	Australia	54–21	South Africa	1963 South Africa Rhinos tour	(Australia) Sydney Cricket Ground, Sydney	16,995	
28 July 1963	Newcastle	27–17 †	South Africa	1963 South Africa Rhinos tour	(Australia) Newcastle	Unknown	
30 July 1963	Parramatta Eels	39–18 †	South Africa	1963 South Africa Rhinos tour	(Australia) Sydney	Unknown	
1 August 1963	Wellington	12–21 †	South Africa	1963 South Africa Rhinos tour	(New Zealand) Wellington	Unknown	
3 August 1963	South Island	12–8 †	South Africa	1963 South Africa Rhinos tour	(New Zealand) Christchurch	+-2500	
7 August 1963	Auckland	10–4 †	South Africa	1963 South Africa Rhinos tour	(New Zealand) Auckland	Unknown	
10 August 1963	New Zealand	3–4 † (Note: This game was not given test status as the South Africa squad contained a number of Austrailans who replaced South African players injured earlier in the tour.)	South Africa	1963 South Africa Rhinos tour	(New Zealand) Carlaw Park, Auckland	Unknown	
Rugby league banned in South Africa
13 November 1992	South Africa	26–30	Commonwealth of Independent States	1992 CIS tour of South Africa	(South Africa) Johannesburg	Unknown	
20 November 1992	South Africa	19–22	Commonwealth of Independent States	1992 CIS tour of South Africa	(South Africa) Pretoria	Unknown	
8 October 1995	Fiji	52–6	South Africa	1995 World Cup	(England) Cougar Park, Keighley	4,845	
10 October 1995	Australia	86–6	South Africa	1995 World Cup	(England) Gateshead International Stadium, Gateshead	9,181	
14 October 1995	England	46–0	South Africa	1995 World Cup	(England) Headingley Rugby Stadium, Leeds	14,041	
6 December 1997	France	30–17	South Africa	Friendly	(France) Arles	Unknown	
19 October 2000	South Africa	12–40	Wales	Friendly	(South Africa) Pretoria	Unknown	
28 October 2000	Tonga	66–18	South Africa	2000 World Cup	(France) Stade Sébastien Charléty, Paris	7,498	
2 November 2000	Papua New Guinea	16–0	South Africa	2000 World Cup	(France) Stadium de Toulouse, Toulouse	4,313	
5 November 2000	France	56–6	South Africa	2000 World Cup	(France) Stadium Municipal d'Albi, Albi	7,969	
9 October 2004	South Africa	22–50	West Indies	Friendly	(England) London	Unknown	
8 June 2006	(United Kingdom) Great Britain Amateurs	34–14 †	South Africa	Friendly	(Italy) Stadio Simone Franchini, Monselice	Unknown	
12 June 2006	Italy	6–76	South Africa	Two-match series friendly	(Italy) Rome	Unknown	
13 June 2006	Italy	20–60	South Africa	Two-match series friendly	(Italy) Rome	Unknown	
9 June 2007	(United Kingdom) Great Britain Amateurs	30–12 †	South Africa	Two-match series friendly	Unknown	Unknown	
16 June 2007	(United Kingdom) Great Britain Amateurs	42–10 †	South Africa	Two-match series friendly	Unknown	Unknown	
17 October 2008	(United Kingdom) Great Britain Amateurs	42–4 †	South Africa	Friendly	Unknown	Unknown	
9 October 2011	Canada	36–22	South Africa	Friendly	(Canada) Fletcher's Field, Markham, Ontario	1,005	
15 October 2011	United States	40–4	South Africa	2013 World Cup: Atlantic Qualifiers	(United States) Philadelphia	~300	
19 October 2011	Jamaica	20–6	South Africa	2013 World Cup: Atlantic Qualifiers	(United States) Philadelphia	Unknown	
2 May 2015	Niue	48–4	South Africa	Friendly	(Australia) Leumeah	Unknown	
25 October 2015	South Africa	12–40	Lebanon	2017 World Cup: Middle East-Africa Qualifiers	(South Africa) Brakpan Stadium, Pretoria	Unknown	
31 October 2015	South Africa	16–50	Lebanon	2017 World Cup: Middle East-Africa Qualifiers	(South Africa) Brakpan Stadium, Pretoria	Unknown	
29 October 2016	South Africa	22–55	Niue	Two-match series friendly	(South Africa) Brakpan Stadium, Pretoria	Unknown	
11 November 2016	South Africa	0–44	Niue	Two-match series friendly	(South Africa) Brakpan Stadium, Pretoria	Unknown	
24 June 2018	South Africa	30–24	Malta	Friendly	(Australia) St Mary's Stadium, Sydney	Unknown	
12 October 2018	Italy	18–8	South Africa	Friendly	(Australia) Kellyville Ridge Stadium, Sydney	Unknown	
21 June 2019	Cook Islands	66–6	South Africa	2021 World Cup: Inter-regional Qualifiers	(Australia) Wentworthville Ringrose park, NSW	78	
5 June 2022	Brazil	0–82	South Africa	Friendly	(Australia) Sunshine Coast Stadium, Noosa	Unknown	
26 November 2022	Poland	16–38	South Africa	Friendly	(Australia) Southport Tigers, Queensland	Unknown	
22 July 2023	Philippines	14–72	South Africa	Friendly	(Australia) Skilled Park, Gold Coast, Queensland	Unknown	
28 October 2023	Italy	50–20	South Africa	Friendly	(Australia) Lidcombe Oval, Sydney	Unknown	
8 November 2023	South Africa	56–12	Kenya	Two-match series friendly	(South Africa) Grizzlies Stadium, Pretoria	Unknown	
11 November 2023	South Africa	82–2	Kenya	Two-match series friendly	(South Africa) Grizzlies Stadium, Pretoria	Unknown	
4 December 2024	South Africa	18–38	United States	Two-match series friendly	(South Africa) Quins-Bobbies Rugby Club, Pretoria		
7 December 2024	South Africa	32–44	United States	Two-match series friendly	(South Africa) Grizzlies Stadium, Pretoria		
4 November 2025	Niue	34–28†	South Africa	Friendly	(Australia) St Mary's Stadium, Sydney		
9 November 2025	Cook Islands	58–6	South Africa	2026 World Cup Qualification – Southern Hemisphere Playoff	(Australia) Western Sydney Stadium, Sydney	3,245	

== IRL Rankings ==
IRL Men's World Rankings
Official rankings as of August 2026
Rank	Change	Team	Pts %
1	Steady	Australia	100
2	Steady	New Zealand	82
3	Steady	England	70
4	Steady	Samoa	56
5	Steady	Tonga	54
6	Steady	Papua New Guinea	47
7	Steady	Fiji	34
8	▲1	Cook Islands	24
9	▲2	Netherlands	23
10	▲2	Ukraine	21
11	▼3	France	21
12	▼2	Serbia	20
13	Steady	Wales	18
14	Steady	Ireland	17
15	Steady	Greece	14
16	Steady	Malta	14
17	▲12	Canada	13
18	▼1	Italy	11
19	▼1	Jamaica	9
20	▲7	Scotland	8
21	▲1	United States	8
22	▼3	Poland	7
23	▼3	Lebanon	7
24	▼1	Germany	7
25	▼1	Czech Republic	6
26	▼5	Norway	6
27	▼2	Chile	5
28	▲2	Philippines	5
29	▼1	South Africa	4
30	Steady	Brazil	3
31	Steady	Morocco	3
32	▲1	Argentina	3
33	▲2	Ghana	2
34	▲2	Kenya	2
35	▼1	Montenegro	2
36	▲1	Nigeria	2
37	▼5	North Macedonia	1
38	Steady	Albania	1
39	Steady	Turkey	1
40	Steady	Bulgaria	1
41	Steady	Cameroon	0
42	Steady	Japan	0
43	Steady	Spain	0
44	Steady	Colombia	0
45	Steady	Russia	0
46	Steady	El Salvador	0
47	Steady	Bosnia and Herzegovina	0
48	Steady	Hong Kong	0
49	Steady	Solomon Islands	0
50	Steady	Vanuatu	0
51	Steady	Hungary	0
52	Steady	Latvia	0
53	Steady	Denmark	0
54	Steady	Belgium	0
55	Steady	Estonia	0
56	Steady	Sweden	0
57	Steady	Niue	0
Complete rankings at www.internationalrugbyleague.com

== See also ==
- Rugby league in South Africa
- South African Rugby League
- Rugby league in Africa
