= 1995 Rugby League World Cup =

- Number of teams: 10
- Host countries: England; Wales
- Winner: Australia (8th title)
- Matches played: 15
- Attendance: 265,609 (17,707 per match)
- Points scored: 718 (47.87 per match)
- Top scorer: (Australia) Andrew Johns (62)
- Top try scorer: (Australia) Steven Menzies (6)

The 1995 Rugby League World Cup (also known as Halifax Centenary World Cup for sponsorship reasons) was the eleventh World Cup for mens national rugby league teams. It was held between 7–28 October and hosted by England and Wales and was won by Australia who beat England at Wembley Stadium, their eighth World Cup win and fifth in succession.

Organised to celebrate the sport's centenary, ten nations were invited to participate. The tournament had been preceded by doubts and pessimism; many feared that it would produce one-sided-matches that would be unattractive to supporters. The forthcoming Super League war also hung over the tournament, with the Australian Rugby League refusing to select players who had signed for the rival competition. Those fears proved unfounded, and the tournament was acclaimed a great success.

Although some early matches did prove as one-sided as feared, fans still flocked to see newer rugby league nations such as Fiji, Tonga, Western Samoa and South Africa. Large home crowds for the group involving Wales proved particularly encouraging for the sport.

For the 1995 tournament, a £10,000 cup was made by Tiffany & Co. to celebrate the centenary of the game.

== Teams ==
Ten teams competed in the Centenary World Cup: Australia, England, Fiji, France, New Zealand, Papua New Guinea, South Africa, Tonga, Wales and Western Samoa. It was the first time since the 1975 World Series that England and Wales competed, rather than Great Britain. Fiji, South Africa, Tonga and Western Samoa all made their World Cup débuts. Scotland and Ireland took part in the Emerging Nations Tournament that was held alongside the World Cup.

Australia was missing some of their best players, a number of whom had been part of the 1994 Kangaroos squad, due to the Super League war and the ARL's refusal to select Super League-aligned players. Australia's win in the end, with what many considered to be a second-string side, was seen as a blow to the Super League organisation, with which every other nation was aligned.

Canberra Raiders players Laurie Daley, Ricky Stuart, Bradley Clyde, Steve Walters and Brett Mullins, won a court order against the ARL making Super League players eligible for representative games. Despite assurances from the ARL that all players were considered, only ARL loyal players were selected for the Kangaroos World Cup squad.

== Venues ==
The games were played at various venues in England and Wales.

Wembley Stadium in London was the host stadium for the opening ceremony and match featuring hosts England and defending champions Australia. Wembley, England's national stadium, would also host the Final of the tournament.

(England) London	(England) Trafford	(England) Wigan	(Wales) Cardiff
Wembley Stadium	Old Trafford	Central Park	Ninian Park
Capacity: 82,000	Capacity: 35,000	Capacity: 30,000	Capacity: 21,508
(England) Leeds	1995 Rugby League World Cup is located in England		(England) Huddersfield
Headingley	1995 Rugby League World Cup is located in England		Alfred McAlpine Stadium
Capacity: 21,000	1995 Rugby League World Cup is located in England		Capacity: 20,000
(England) St. Helens	1995 Rugby League World Cup is located in England		(England) Gateshead
Knowsley Road	1995 Rugby League World Cup is located in England		Gateshead International Stadium
Capacity: 17,500	1995 Rugby League World Cup is located in England		Capacity: 11,800
(Wales) Swansea	(England) Hull	(England) Warrington	(England) Keighley
Vetch Field	The Boulevard	Wilderspool Stadium	Cougar Park
Capacity: 11,500	Capacity: 10,500	Capacity: 9,200	Capacity: 7,800

== Group stage ==
=== Group A ===
Team	Pld	W	D	L	PF	PA	PD	Pts	Qualification
England	3	3	0	0	112	16	+96	6	Advances to knockout stage
Australia	3	2	0	1	168	26	+142	4	Advances to knockout stage
Fiji	3	1	0	2	52	118	−66	2	
South Africa	3	0	0	3	12	184	−172	0	

7 October

England	20–16	Australia
Tries: Farrell, Joynt, Robinson, Newlove; Goals: Farrell (2)		Tries: Menzies (2), Coyne; Goals: Wishart (2)

Wembley Stadium, London
Attendance: 41,271
Referee: Stuart Cummings (England)

8 October

Fiji	52–6	South Africa
Tries: Sovatabua (2), Seru (2), Nadruku, Taga, Sagaitu, Marayawa, Naisoro, Dakuitoga; Goals: Nayacakalou (3), Taga (3)		Goals: van Wyk (3)

Cougar Park, Keighley
Attendance: 4,845
Referee: David Manson (Australia)

10 October

Australia	86–6	South Africa
Tries: Hopoate (3), McGregor (2), A. Johns (2), D. Moore (2), O'Davis (2), Kosef, Raper, Dymock, Smith, Brasher; Goals: A. Johns (11)		Tries: Watts; Goals: van Wyk

Gateshead International Stadium, Gateshead
Attendance: 9,181
Referee: Russell Smith (England)

11 October

England	46–0	Fiji
Tries: Robinson (2), Radlinski, Bentley, Broadbent, Haughton, Smith, Newlove; Goals: Farrell (4), Goulding (3)

Central Park, Wigan
Attendance: 26,263
Referee: Dennis Hale (New Zealand)

14 October

Australia	66–0	Fiji
Tries: Dallas (3), O'Davis (3), Menzies (2), Hill (2), Brasher, Larson; Goals: A. Johns (9)

McAlpine Stadium, Huddersfield
Attendance: 7,127
Referee: Eddie Ward (Australia)

14 October

England	46–0	South Africa
Tries: Pinkney (2), Haughton, Goulding, Sampson, Broadbent, Radlinski, Smith; Goals: Goulding (7)

Headingley Rugby Stadium, Leeds
Attendance: 14,041
Referee: David Manson (Australia)

=== Group B ===
Team	Pld	W	D	L	PF	PA	PD	Pts	Qualification
New Zealand	2	2	0	0	47	30	+17	4	Advanced to knockout stage
Tonga	2	0	1	1	52	53	−1	1	
Papua New Guinea	2	0	1	1	34	50	−16	1	

8 October

New Zealand	25–24	Tonga
Tries: Blackmore (2), Hoppe, Kemp, Okesene; Goals: Ridge (2); Drop goals: Ridge		Tries: Wolfgramm, Taufa, Veikoso, Finau; Goals: Amone (4)

Wilderspool Stadium, Warrington
Attendance: 8,083
Referee: David Campbell (England)

10 October

Papua New Guinea	28–28	Tonga
Tries: Lam, Paiyo, Buko, Gene, Solbat; Goals: Paiyo (4)		Tries: Guttenbeil (2), Howlett, Wolfgramm, Liku, Taufa; Goals: Amone (2)

The Boulevard, Hull
Attendance: 5,121
Referee: Claude Alba (France)

13 October

New Zealand	22–6	Papua New Guinea
Tries: Ridge, Blackmore, Hoppe; Goals: Ridge (4), Ngamu		Tries: Bai; Goals: Paiyo

Knowsley Road, St Helens
Attendance: 8,679
Referee: Stuart Cummings (England)

=== Group C ===
Team	Pld	W	D	L	PF	PA	PD	Pts	Qualification
Wales	2	2	0	0	50	16	+34	4	Advanced to knockout stage
Western Samoa	2	1	0	1	66	32	+34	2	
France	2	0	0	2	16	84	−68	0	

9 October

Wales	28–6	France
Tries: Sullivan (3), Harris, Devereux; Goals: Davies (3), Harris		Tries: Torreilles; Goals: Banquet

Ninian Park, Cardiff
Attendance: 10,250
Referee: Eddie Ward (Australia)

12 October

Western Samoa	56–10	France
Tries: Tuigamala (2), Matautia (2), Tatupu (2), Swann, P. Tuimavave, Laumatia, Perelini; Goals: Schuster (8)		Tries: Chamorin, Cabestany; Goals: Banquet

Ninian Park, Cardiff
Attendance: 2,173
Referee: Kelvin Jeffs (Australia)

15 October

Wales	22–10	Western Samoa
Tries: Harris, Sullivan, Ellis; Goals: Davies (4); Drop goals: Davies, Harris		Tries: Matautia; Goals: Schuster (3)

Vetch Field, Swansea
Attendance: 15,385
Referee: Russell Smith (England)

== Knockout Stage ==
=== Semi-finals ===
England as expected defeated reigning European Champions Wales in their semi-final at Old Trafford. The other Semi at Huddersfield almost produced a boil over. After defeating New Zealand 3–0 in the Trans-Tasman Test series earlier in the year, and with the Kiwis lackluster form in their Group B games, Australia was expected to easily account for Frank Endacott's side, but the Kiwis found form and the game ended 20–all at the end of 80 minutes (following a missed sideline conversion attempt by the Kiwis Matthew Ridge and a missed left foot drop goal attempt by the same player - both in the last few minutes of regular time). However, 20 minutes of extra time saw Australia skip away to a 30–20 win to book their place in the Final at Wembley.

21 October 1995

England	25–10	Wales
Tries: Offiah (2), Newlove, Betts, Clarke; Goals: Farrell, Goulding; Drop goals: Goulding		Tries: Phillips; Goals: Davies (3)

Old Trafford, Manchester
Attendance: 30,042
Referee: Eddie Ward (Australia)
Player of the Match: Bobbie Goulding (England)

22 October 1995

Australia	30–20 (a.e.t.)	New Zealand
Tries: Menzies (2), Brasher, Coyne, Hill, Fittler; Goals: A. Johns (3)		Tries: Barnett, T. Iro, K. Iro; Goals: Ridge (4)

Alfred McAlpine Stadium, Huddersfield
Attendance: 16,608
Referee: Russell Smith (England)
Player of the Match: Brad Fittler (Australia)

=== Final ===
The Australians had reached the final after a hard-fought 30–20 Semi-final win over New Zealand at the McAlpine Stadium which had gone into extra time after the score was locked at 20-all after 80 minutes. Their opponents and tournament host England, had an easier time defeating Wales 25–10 in their semi at Old Trafford. Even though they were favoured to win, Australia went into the final having lost three of their past four games at Wembley (the only win being the World Cup final of 1992), and had already lost the opening match of the tournament there to the English. Also, due to the ARL's policy of not selecting Super League aligned players, the Kangaroos went into the game with 11 of their 17 players under the age of 24. Although considered mostly a 'second string' team without the likes of Laurie Daley, Ricky Stuart, Andrew Ettingshausen, Steve Renouf, Steve Walters and Glenn Lazarus, most of the Kangaroos had played in the 3–0 whitewash of New Zealand in the Trans-Tasman series earlier in the year. Kangaroos captain and five-eighth Brad Fittler and fullback Tim Brasher were the only members of Australia's 1992 World Cup final win over Great Britain at Wembley, with both players in the same positions as they had been three years previously.

England's captain Shaun Edwards ruled himself out of the final with an infected knee. Despite almost being ruled out of the tournament with pneumonia, St Helens centre Paul Newlove was selected by coach Phil Larder for starting line-up in the final. Larder also handed the captaincy to veteran test forward Denis Betts. With the former Wigan back rower now playing for the Auckland Warriors in the Australian premiership, his selection as captain created history as he became the first player to captain England while not currently playing in the British competition.

After winning in 1992, Australian coach Bob Fulton became just the second coach (after Harry Bath) to win two Rugby League World Cups. It was Fulton's 5th World Cup win after also winning in 1968, 1970 and 1975 as a player. Coincidentally, Fulton's coach in the 1968 and 1970 World Cup finals was Harry Bath.

Status Quo performed the pre-match entertainment, performing When You Walk in the Room and Rockin' All Over the World.

28 October 1995
14:30

England	8–16	Australia
Tries: Paul Newlove Goals: Bobby Goulding (2/3)		Tries: Rod Wishart; Tim Brasher; Goals: Andrew Johns (4/6)

Wembley Stadium, London
Attendance: 66,540
Referee: Stuart Cummings (England)
Player of the Match: Andrew Johns (Australia)

England	Australia

FB	1	Kris Radlinski
RW	2	Jason Robinson
RC	3	Gary Connolly
LC	4	Paul Newlove
LW	5	Martin Offiah
SO	6	Tony Smith
SH	7	Bobbie Goulding
PR	8	Karl Harrison
HK	9	Lee Jackson
PR	10	Andy Platt
SR	11	Denis Betts (c)
SR	12	Phil Clarke
LF	13	Andy Farrell
Substitutions:
IC	14	Barrie-Jon Mather
IC	15	Mick Cassidy
IC	16	Nick Pinkney
IC	17	Chris Joynt
Coach:
(England) Phil Larder

FB	1	Tim Brasher
LW	2	Rod Wishart
RC	3	Mark Coyne
LC	4	Terry Hill
RW	5	Brett Dallas
FE	6	Brad Fittler (c)
HB	7	Geoff Toovey
PR	8	Dean Pay
HK	9	Andrew Johns
PR	10	Mark Carroll
SR	11	Steve Menzies
SR	12	Gary Larson
LK	13	Jim Dymock
Substitutions:
IC	14	Robbie O'Davis
IC	15	Matthew Johns
IC	16	Jason Smith
IC	17	Nik Kosef
Coach:
(Australia) Bob Fulton

First half

England won the coin toss and Australia's Andrew Johns kicked off the match. In England's first set with the ball Australia were penalised for their skipper Brad Fittler's high tackle on Andrew Farrell. From the resulting good field position England were able to force a line drop-out and get another set of six in Australia's half of the field. At the end of the set, Radlinski put up a high kick, which Australia's fullback Tim Brasher failed to secure and Australia were penalised for regathering the ball when off-side. Bobbie Goulding kicked the penalty goal from fifteen metres out, giving his side a 2–0 lead. From Australia's resulting kick-off, the English players couldn't secure the ball and it was regathered by the Kangaroos deep in the opposition half. On the last tackle of the ensuing set, Johns at first receiver put a chip kick into the left-hand corner of England's in-goal area where winger Rod Wishart dived in and got a hand on it, giving Australia the first try of the match in the seventh minute. Johns then converted the try from the touch-line and the Kangaroos were leading 6–2. A few minutes later England were penalised around the centre of the field and Johns attempted the kick at goal but missed. With the game now swinging from end to end, Johns conceded a penalty close to the goal posts and Goulding's kick bounced off the uprights but went in, so England were trailing 6–4 by the eighteenth minute. A few minutes later England conceded a penalty in front of their goal posts and Johns kicked Australia to an 8–4 lead. Shortly after that England winger Martin Offiah made a break down along the left sideline and was contentiously ruled to have been taken over the sideline by a desperate Tim Brasher tackle as he threw the ball back into the field for Paul Newlove to toe ahead and dive on, though television replays suggested that Offiah had managed to release the ball before he went into touch. After a high shot from Andy Farrell on Mark Carroll, Johns kicked another penalty giving Australia a 10–4 lead at the 30-minute mark. Just before the half-time break England conceded another penalty in the ruck but Johns' kick missed so the score remained unchanged at the break.

Second half

After making their way into good attacking field position, England played the ball ten metres out from Australia's goal-line where centre Paul Newlove at dummy-half ran the ball at the defence forced his way through to score in the left corner. The sideline conversion attempt by Goulding missed so England trailed 10–8 after five minutes of the second half. Around the ten-minute mark the game was interrupted by a topless female streaker. The play continued swinging from one end of the field to the other, with neither team able to capitalise on their scoring opportunities for the next twenty minutes. Australian interchange player Jason Smith was blood binned and had to return to the bench. A few minutes later the Kangaroos had made their way deep into England's half when, on the last tackle, the ball was moved through the hands and eventually flicked passed back from Johns as he was being tackled to the feet of Brasher who kicked it ahead to the try-line. Both fullbacks then scrambled to get to the ball and the referee ruled that Brasher had grounded it, awarding Australia a try. Johns converted the try so Australia lead 16–8 with just over 10 minutes remaining. England forward Karl Harrison then had to come off the field with an injured arm. A few minutes from full-time Australian forward Mark Carroll was sent to the sin-bin for an infringement in the ruck. The remainder of the match extended into additional injury time but was played with no further points so Australia retained the World Cup with a 16–8 victory and their fifth consecutive world title.

21-year-old Andrew Johns was named man-of-the-match. Kangaroos coach Bob Fulton had named the young half as the team hooker, and he did indeed pack into the scrums. However Johns played at halfback in general play with Geoff Toovey having the dummy-half duties, necessary because Toovey had actually injured his neck during the tournament and simply could not pack into the front row in the scrums.

Following the match Prince Edward, Earl of Wessex presented Kangaroos captain Brad Fittler with the Cup and each of the players with medals. During the 1990 Kangaroo Tour, an 18-year-old Fittler had reportedly broken protocol when he had said "G'day dude" to Prince Edward's father, Prince Philip, Duke of Edinburgh when the team had met the Duke as part of the tour. History allegedly repeated itself as Fittler was heard to say "Thanks dude" to Prince Edward when receiving the World Cup on the Wembley balcony.

== Team of the tournament ==
The following players were selected as the 1995 World Cup "Team of the Tournament"

No.

Position
Player

1 Iestyn Harris – FB 2 Jason Robinson – WG 3 Paul Newlove – CE 4 Richard Blackmore – CE 5 Anthony Sullivan – WG 6 Brad Fittler – FE 7 Adrian Lam – HB

No.

Position
Player

8 Mark Carroll – PR 9 Lee Jackson – HK 10 David Westley – PR 11 Denis Betts – SR 12 Steve Menzies – SR 13 Andy Farrell – LK

== Try scorers ==
6 tries

- (Australia) Steve Menzies

5 tries

- (Australia) Robbie O'Davis

4 tries

- (Australia) Tim Brasher
- (England) Paul Newlove
- (Wales) Anthony Sullivan

3 tries

- (Australia) Brett Dallas
- (Australia) Terry Hill
- (Australia) John Hopoate
- (England) Jason Robinson
- (New Zealand) Richie Blackmore
- (Samoa) Vila Matautia

2 tries

- (Australia) Mark Coyne
- (Australia) Andrew Johns
- (Australia) Paul McGregor
- (Australia) Danny Moore
- (England) Paul Broadbent
- (England) Simon Haughton
- (England) Martin Offiah
- (England) Nick Pinkney
- (England) Kris Radlinski
- (England) Tony Smith
- (Fiji) Fili Seru
- (Fiji) Waisale Sovatabua
- (New Zealand) Sean Hoppe
- (Samoa) Tony Tatupu
- (Samoa) Va'aiga Tuigamala
- (Tonga) Awen Guttenbeil
- (Tonga) Una Taufa
- (Tonga) Willie Wolfgramm
- (Wales) Iestyn Harris

1 try

- (Australia) Jim Dymock
- (Australia) Brad Fittler
- (Australia) Nik Kosef
- (Australia) Gary Larson
- (Australia) Aaron Raper
- (Australia) Jason Smith
- (Australia) Rod Wishart
- (England) John Bentley
- (England) Denis Betts
- (England) Phil Clarke
- (England) Andrew Farrell
- (England) Bobbie Goulding
- (England) Chris Joynt
- (England) Dean Sampson
- (Fiji) Joe Dakuitoga
- (Fiji) Samuela Marayawa
- (Fiji) Noa Nadruku
- (Fiji) Kalaveti Naisoro
- (Fiji) Ian Sagaitu
- (Fiji) Savenaca Taga
- (France) Didier Cabestany
- (France) Pierre Chamorin
- (France) Patrick Torreilles
- (New Zealand) Richie Barnett
- (New Zealand) Kevin Iro
- (New Zealand) Tony Iro
- (New Zealand) Tony Kemp
- (New Zealand) Hitro Okesene
- (New Zealand) Matthew Ridge
- (Papua New Guinea) Marcus Bai
- (Papua New Guinea) David Buko
- (Papua New Guinea) Stanley Gene
- (Papua New Guinea) Adrian Lam
- (Papua New Guinea) Elias Paiyo
- (Papua New Guinea) Lucas Solbat
- (Samoa) Brian Laumatia
- (Samoa) Apollo Perelini
- (Samoa) Willie Swann
- (Samoa) Paki Tuimavave
- (South Africa) Gideon Watts
- (Tonga) Salesi Finau
- (Tonga) Phil Howlett
- (Tonga) Tau'alupe Liku
- (Tonga) Jimmy Veikoso
- (Wales) John Devereux
- (Wales) Kevin Ellis
- (Wales) Rowland Phillips
