= 1997 Sheffield Eagles season =

- Super League II Rank: 8th
- Challenge Cup: Fifth round
- 1997 record: Wins: 12; draws: 0; losses: 15
- Points scored: For: 589; against: 677

Team information
- Coach: John Kear
- Stadium: Don Valley Stadium
← 1996	List of seasons	1998 →

The 1997 Sheffield Eagles season was the 14th season in the club's rugby league history and the second season in the Super League. Coached by John Kear, the Eagles competed in Super League II and finished in 8th place. The club also reached the fifth round of the Challenge Cup.

== Table ==
Pos	Team	Pld	W	D	L	PF	PA	PD	Pts	Relegation
1	Bradford Bulls (C)	22	20	0	2	769	397	+372	40	
2	London Broncos	22	15	3	4	616	418	+198	33	
3	St Helens	22	14	1	7	592	506	+86	29	
4	Wigan	22	14	0	8	683	398	+285	28	
5	Leeds Rhinos	22	13	1	8	544	463	+81	27	
6	Salford Reds	22	11	0	11	428	495	−67	22	
7	Halifax Blue Sox	22	8	2	12	524	549	−25	18	
8	Sheffield Eagles	22	9	0	13	415	574	−159	18	
9	Warrington Wolves	22	8	0	14	437	647	−210	16	
10	Castleford Tigers	22	5	2	15	334	515	−181	12	
11	Paris Saint-Germain	22	6	0	16	362	572	−210	12	
12	Oldham Bears (R)	22	4	1	17	461	631	−170	9	Relegated to Division One

Source: Rugby League Project
Rules for classification: 1) Points; 2) Points difference; 3) Number of points scored;
(C) Champions; (R) Relegated

== Squad ==
No	Player
1	Waisale Sovatabua
2	Bright Sodje
3	Lynton Stott
4	Keith Senior
5	Jean-Marc Garcia
6	Matt Crowther
7	Mark Aston
8	Paul Broadbent
9	Johnny Lawless
10	Dale Laughton
11	Paul Carr
14	David Mycoe
15	Darren Turner
16	Danny McAllister
18	Wayne Flynn
19	Rod Doyle
20	Steve Edmed
21	Willie Morganson
22	Whetu Taewa
23	Nick Pinkney
24	Martin Wood
25	Alex Thompson
27	Jason Erba
31	Ricky Wright
32	Marcus Vassilakop
33	Anderson Okiwe
