= 1996 Sheffield Eagles season =

- Super League I Rank: 7th
- Challenge Cup: Fifth round
- 1996 record: Wins: 11; draws: 0; losses: 13
- Points scored: For: 654; against: 768

Team information
- Coach: Gary Hetherington (until October 1996); Phil Larder (from November 1996)
- Stadium: Don Valley Stadium
List of seasons	1997 →

The 1996 Sheffield Eagles season was the 13th season in the club's rugby league history and the first season in the Super League. Coached by Gary Hetherington, the Eagles competed in Super League I and finished in 7th place. The club also reached the fifth round of the Challenge Cup.

== Table ==
Super League I
Pos	Team	Pld	W	D	L	PF	PA	PD	Pts	Qualification or relegation
1	St Helens (C)	22	20	0	2	950	455	+495	40	Qualified for Premiership semi final
2	Wigan	22	19	1	2	902	326	+576	39	Qualified for Premiership semi final
3	Bradford Bulls	22	17	0	5	767	409	+358	34	Qualified for Premiership semi final
4	London Broncos	22	12	1	9	611	462	+149	25	Qualified for Premiership semi final
5	Warrington Wolves	22	12	0	10	569	565	+4	24	
6	Halifax Blue Sox	22	10	1	11	667	576	+91	21	
7	Sheffield Eagles	22	10	0	12	599	730	−131	20	
8	Oldham Bears	22	9	1	12	473	681	−208	19	
9	Castleford Tigers	22	9	0	13	548	599	−51	18	
10	Leeds	22	6	0	16	555	745	−190	12	
11	Paris Saint-Germain	22	3	1	18	398	795	−397	7	
12	Workington Town (R)	22	2	1	19	325	1021	−696	5	Relegated to Division One

Source: Rugby League Project
Rules for classification: 1) Points; 2) Points difference; 3) Number of points scored;
(C) Champions; (R) Relegated

== Squad ==
Statistics include appearances and points in the Super League and Challenge Cup.

Player	Apps	Tries	Goals	DGs	Points
Mark Aston	22	2	87	1	183
Paul Broadbent	24	3	0	0	12
Paul Carr	13	2	0	0	8
Richard Chapman	1	2	0	0	8
Michael Cook	21	2	0	0	8
Matt Crowther	15	7	8	0	44
Joe Dakuitoga	10	1	0	0	4
Paul Dixon	12	2	0	0	8
Anthony Farrell	20	5	0	0	20
Mark Gamson	5	0	0	0	0
Jean-Marc Garcia	23	13	0	0	52
Danny Grimley	5	1	0	0	4
Andy Hay	19	5	0	0	20
Ian Hughes	19	4	0	0	16
Dale Laughton	16	1	0	0	4
Dean Lawford	14	2	1	1	11
Johnny Lawless	21	9	0	0	36
Danny McAllister	22	4	0	0	16
David Mycoe	11	0	1	0	2
Richard Price	5	2	0	0	8
Keith Senior	22	17	0	0	68
Ryan Sheridan	14	6	0	1	25
Bright Sodje	13	7	0	0	28
Waisale Sovatabua	16	5	0	0	20
Lynton Stott	22	10	0	1	41
Lawrence Taylor	1	0	0	0	0
Darren Turner	14	2	0	0	8
Malakai Yasa	4	0	0	0	0
