= 1998 in rugby league =

1998 brought the start of the National Rugby League competition. Super League (Australia) ended its 1 year competition and the Australian Rugby League also ended theirs to merge as one. But for some clubs it came at a cost. For the Hunter Mariners and Perth Reds from Super League (Australia) and the South Queensland Crushers from the Australian Rugby League, these franchises ended. But a new franchise was created that was the first team in the state of Victoria: the Melbourne Storm.

- April 24, Auckland, New Zealand – ANZAC test match is won by New Zealand 22–16 against Australia at North Harbour Stadium before 24,640.
- May 2, Wembley Stadium – 1998 Challenge Cup tournament culminates in Sheffield Eagles' surprise 17–8 win in the final against Wigan Warriors.
- May 29 at Sydney, Australia – record for biggest comeback in Australian premiership history is broken by the North Queensland Cowboys who came from 26–0 down at halftime to win 36–28 against the Penrith Panthers at Penrith Stadium.
- June 19, Sydney Football Stadium – 1998 State of Origin is won by Queensland in the third and deciding game of the series against New South Wales.
- September 20, Australia – last match of the last round of the 1998 Telstra Premiership is played, including the final NRL appearances of the Gold Coast Chargers, Illawarra Steelers, St. George Dragons, Adelaide Rams and North Sydney Bears clubs.
- September 23, New South Wales, Australia – St. George Dragons and Illawarra Steelers ensured their survival by forming the NRL's first joint venture: the St. George Illawarra Dragons.
- September 27, Sydney Football Stadium – 1998 NRL season, the National Rugby League's first, culminates in the Brisbane Broncos' 38–12 win in the grand final against the Canterbury Bulldogs.
- October 24, Old Trafford – Super League III culminates in the Wigan Warriors' 10–4 win in the grand final against the Leeds Rhinos; this was the first time the British season's champions were determined by a final since 1973.
- November 7 - Bolton, England: New Zealand wrap up the 1998 Test series against Great Britain by winning the second test 36–26 at Reebok Stadium before a crowd of 27,486.
