= Patrick Walker =

Pat, Patric or Patrick Walker may refer to:

- Pat Walker (activist) (1939–1999), American activist, poet, and businesswoman
- Pat Walker (footballer) (born 1959), Irish footballer
- Pat Walker (rugby league) (born 1986), English rugby league footballer
- Pat Walker (philanthropist) (1919–2016), American philanthropist
- Patric Walker (1931–1995), American-born British astrologer
- Patrick Walker (executive), British media executive
- Patrick Walker (MI5 officer) (1932–2021), director general of MI5
- Patrick Gordon Walker (1907–1980), British politician
- Pat Walker (footballer) (born 1959), Irish football manager and former player
- Patrick Walker, British musician, Warning and 40 Watt Sun lead singer and guitarist
- Patrick Walker (born 1992), American actor, star of Doc
