= Darren Shaw =

Professional RL coach & former Scotland international rugby league footballer

Personal information
- Full name: Darren Shaw
- Born: 5 October 1971 (age 54) Australia

Playing information
- Position: Second-row
Club
Years	Team	Pld	T	G	FG	P
1995–96	London Broncos		4	0	0	16
1997	Canberra Raiders	1	0	0	0	0
1998–99	Sheffield Eagles	57	3	0	1	13
2000–01	Castleford Tigers	59	1	0	0	4
2002	London Broncos	9	0	0	0	0
2002	Salford Red Devils	15	1	0	0	4
2003	Oldham R.L.F.C.	1	0	0	0	0
2004	Rochdale Hornets	1	0	0	0	0
	Total	143	9	0	1	37
Representative
Years	Team	Pld	T	G	FG	P
1995–01	Scotland	12	1	0	0	4

Coaching information
Club
Years	Team	Gms	W	D	L	W%
2006–08	Leigh Centurions
2008	Rochdale Hornets
	Total	0	0	0	0
- As of 11 February 2021

Darren Shaw (born 5 October 1971) is a former Scotland international rugby league footballer, and coach. He has previously coached the Rochdale Hornets.

Before his coaching career, Shaw played for a number of clubs in England and Australia. Shaw played for Brisbane Broncos, London Broncos, Sheffield Eagles, Castleford Tigers, Salford City Reds, Oldham RLFC and Rochdale Hornets.

He played second-row in Sheffield Eagles' 17–8 victory over Wigan in the 1998 Challenge Cup Final during Super League III at Wembley Stadium, London on Saturday 2 May 1998.

Darren Shaw was assistant coach to Bobbie Goulding at Rochdale Hornets prior to taking charge at Leigh in 2006. Shaw replaced Tony Benson after Benson was relieved of his duties following a shock play-off defeat by Batley Bulldogs.

Shortly after Shaw's appointment it was found that he did not have the relevant coaching qualifications to take charge of a team at National Leagues level. To counter this, Shaw was made Football Manager, with Paul Rowley becoming First Team coach.

Darren Shaw's first full season in charge of Leigh Centurions ended with a 19–6 play off defeat away to Whitehaven. Leigh's 2007 season was one dogged by inconsistency. Convincing wins were often followed by heavy defeats as Shaw was forced to field a number of youngsters due to injury problems. The unsettled nature of the side in 2007 was reflected by the fact that Shaw gave débuts to over 20 players over the course of the season.

Despite the disappointing end to the 2007 season, Shaw was given a contract to coach Leigh for the 2008 season.

After a promising start to the 2008 season, Shaw tendered his resignation following defeats by Salford, Widnes and Featherstone Rovers.

He was appointed as head coach of Rochdale Hornets in May 2008.

== Challenge Cup Final appearances ==
Dale Laughton played at second-row in Sheffield Eagles' 17–8 victory over Wigan in the 1998 Challenge Cup Final during Super League III at Wembley Stadium, London on Saturday 2 May 1998.
