= Brambani =

Brambani is an Italian surname. Notable people with the surname include:

- Dominic Brambani (born 1985), Italian rugby league footballer
- Lisa Brambani (born 1967), English cyclist
