= 2010 Super League season results =

Rugby league competition results

This is a list of the 2010 Super League season results. Super League is the top-flight rugby league competition in the United Kingdom and France. The 2010 season started on 29 January, when Crusaders RL played their rearranged round 4 fixture against Leeds Rhinos, and will end on 2 October with the 2010 Super League Grand Final.

The 2010 Super League season consisted of two stages. The regular season was played over 27 round-robin fixtures, in which each of the fourteen teams involved in the competition played each other once at home and once away, as well as their Magic Weekend fixtures played over the May Day bank holiday. In Super League XV, a win was worth two points in the table, a draw worth one point apiece, and a loss yielded no points.

The league leaders at the end of the regular season received the League Leaders' Shield, but the Championship will be decided through the second stage of the season—the play-offs. The top eight teams in the table contested to play in the 2010 Super League Grand Final, the winners of which are crowned Super League XV Champions.

== Regular season ==
=== Round 1 ===
Home	Score	Away	Match Information
Home	Score	Away	Date and Time	Venue	Referee	Attendance
Huddersfield Giants	24–12	Bradford Bulls	5 February, 20:00 GMT	Galpharm Stadium	Steve Ganson	9,774
Wigan Warriors	38–6	Crusaders RL	5 February, 20:00 GMT	DW Stadium	Jamie Child	13,680
Leeds Rhinos	10–24	Castleford Tigers	5 February, 20:00 GMT	Headingley Stadium	Ian Smith	15,875
St Helens R.F.C.	12–32	Hull	6 February, 18:00 GMT	GPW Recruitment Stadium	Ben Thaler	12,142
Hull Kingston Rovers	30–12	Salford City Reds	7 February, 15:00 GMT	New Craven Park	Richard Silverwood	9,123
Warrington Wolves	58–0	Harlequins RL	7 February, 15:00 GMT	Halliwell Jones Stadium	Theirry Alibert	11,678
Wakefield Trinity Wildcats	28–20	Catalans Dragons	7 February, 15:30 GMT	Belle Vue	Phil Bentham	5,818

=== Round 2 ===
Home	Score	Away	Match Information
Home	Score	Away	Date and Time	Venue	Referee	Attendance
Hull	14–6	Huddersfield Giants	12 February, 20:00 GMT	KC Stadium	Thierry Albert	14,520
Salford City Reds	16–36	Crusaders RL	12 February, 20:00 GMT	The Willows	Steve Ganson	3,421
Wigan Warriors	32–6	Hull Kingston Rovers	12 February, 20:00 GMT	DW Stadium	Ian Smith	12,429
Castleford Tigers	16–28	Warrington Wolves	13 February, 17:45 GMT	The Jungle	Ben Thaler	7,569
Harlequins RL	16–4	Catalans Dragons	14 February, 14:00 GMT	Twickenham Stoop	Richard Silverwood	2,330
Bradford Bulls	6–38	St Helens RLFC	14 February, 15:00 GMT	Grattan Stadium	Phil Bentham	10,165
Wakefield Trinity Wildcats	28–18	Leeds Rhinos	14 February, 15:30 GMT	Belle Vue	Jamie Child	9,783

=== Round 3 ===
Home	Score	Away	Match Information
Home	Score	Away	Date and Time	Venue	Referee	Attendance
Harlequins RL	10–18	Wakefield Trinity Wildcats	30 January, 15:00 GMT^{A}	The Stoop	Ian Smith	3,688
Bradford Bulls	41–22	Castleford Tigers	19 February, 20:00 GMT	Grattan Stadium	Thierry Alibert	8,019
Leeds Rhinos	22–10	Salford City Reds	19 February, 20:00 GMT	Headingley Stadium	Phil Bentham	12,700
Catalans Dragons	12–42	St Helens RLFC	20 February, 16:30 GMT	Stade Gilbert Brutus	Steve Ganson	7,825
Warrington Wolves	20–22	Wigan Warriors	20 February, 17:30 GMT	Halliwell Jones Stadium	Richard Silverwood	13,024
Crusaders RL	18–16	Hull	21 February, 15:00 GMT	Racecourse Ground	Ian Smith	6,794
Hull Kingston Rovers	0–30	Huddersfield Giants	21 February, 15:00 GMT	New Craven Park	Ben Thaler	7,575

=== Round 4 ===
Home	Score	Away	Match Information
Home	Score	Away	Date and Time	Venue	Referee	Attendance
Crusaders RL	6–34	Leeds Rhinos	29 January, 20:00 GMT^{B}	Racecourse Ground	Ben Thaler	10,334
Wigan Warriors	58–0	Catalans Dragons	26 February, 20:00 GMT	DW Stadium	Ben Thaler	12,001
St Helens	22–16	Wakefield Trinity Wildcats	26 February, 20:00 GMT	GPW Recruitment Stadium	Thierry Alibert	10,717
Hull	28–4	Harlequins	26 February, 20:00 GMT	The KC Stadium	Steve Ganson	13,965
Salford City Reds	0–7	Bradford Bulls	26 February, 20:00 GMT	The Willows	James Child	3,806
Castleford Tigers	20–24	Hull KR	27 February, 18:15 GMT	The Jungle	Phil Bentham	6,855
Huddersfield Giants	10–14	Warrington Wolves	28 February, 15:00 GMT	Galpharm Stadium	Ian Smith	8,567

=== Round 5 ===
Home	Score	Away	Match Information
Home	Score	Away	Date and Time	Venue	Referee	Attendance
Bradford Bulls	22–20	Wigan Warriors	5 March, 20:00 GMT	Grattan Stadium	Phil Bentham	9,244
Hull	42–22	Castleford Tigers	5 March, 20:00 GMT	KC Stadium	Richard Silverwood	13,352
Leeds Rhinos	62–4	Harlequins RL	5 March, 20:00 GMT	Headingley Stadium	Thierry Alibert	12,684
Salford City Reds	12–24	Catalans Dragons	5 March, 20:00 GMT	The Willows	Steve Ganson	3,022
Wakefield Trinity Wildcats	0–52	Huddersfield Giants	6 March, 17:45 GMT	Belle Vue	Ben Thaler	5,237
Hull KR	28–24	St Helens	7 March, 15:00 GMT	New Craven Park	Ian Smith	8,202
Warrington Wolves	46–12	Crusaders RL	7 March, 15:00 GMT	Halliwell Jones Stadium	James Child	11,113

=== Round 6 ===
Home	Score	Away	Match Information
Home	Score	Away	Date and Time	Venue	Referee	Attendance
Hull KR	18–31	Wakefield Trinity Wildcats	12 March, 20:00 GMT	New Craven Park	James Child	8,004
St Helens	37–30	Crusaders RL	12 March, 20:00 GMT	GPW Recruitment Stadium	Phil Bentham	8,507
Wigan Warriors	48–24	Hull	12 March, 20:00 GMT	DW Stadium	Thierry Alibert	15,045
Catalans Dragons	12–24	Castleford Tigers	13 March, 17:30 GMT	Stade Gilbert Brutus	Ian Smith	6,810
Warrington Wolves	33–8	Bradford Bulls	13 March, 17:40 GMT	Halliwell Jones Stadium	Steve Ganson	10,434
Harlequins RL	22–26	Salford City Reds	14 March, 14:00 GMT	The Stoop	Ben Thaler	2,395
Huddersfield Giants	26–20	Leeds Rhinos	14 March, 15:00 GMT	Galpharm Stadium	Richard Silverwood	10,116

=== Round 7 ===
Home	Score	Away	Match Information
Home	Score	Away	Date and Time	Venue	Referee	Attendance
Crusaders RL	14–6	Catalans Dragons	19 March, 20:00 GMT	Racecourse Ground	Thierry Alibert	6,124
Hull	18–6	Bradford Bulls	19 March, 20:00 GMT	KC Stadium	Ben Thaler	14,446
Leeds Rhinos	10–17	Hull KR	19 March, 20:00 GMT	Headingley Stadium	Steve Ganson	15,201
St Helens	28–18	Warrington Wolves	19 March, 20:00 GMT	GPW Recruitment Stadium	Richard Silverwood	17,500
Harlequins RL	18–32	Huddersfield Giants	20 March, 17:45 GMT	Twickenham Stoop	Phil Bentham	2,624
Castleford Tigers	22–36	Wigan Warriors	21 March, 15:30 GMT	The Jungle	James Child	8,493
Wakefield Trinity Wildcats	36–6	Salford City Reds	21 March, 15:30 GMT	Belle Vue	Gareth Hewer	4,883

=== Round 8 ===
Home	Score	Away	Match Information
Home	Score	Away	Date and Time	Venue	Referee	Attendance
Bradford Bulls	19–12	Harlequins RL	26 March, 20:00 GMT	Gratten Stadium	Richard Silverwood	7,153
Castleford Tigers	22–16	Crusaders RL	26 March, 20:00 GMT	The Jungle	Ian Smith	5,299
Warrington Wolves	32–16	Wakefield Trinity Wildcats	26 March, 20:00 GMT	Halliwell Jones Stadium	Phil Bentham	10,723
Wigan Warriors	24–4	Leeds Rhinos	26 March, 20:00 GMT	DW Stadium	Steve Ganson	17,883
Catalans Dragons	16–10	Hull KR	27 March, 19:30 GMT	Stade Gilbert Brutus	Ben Thaler	6,513
Salford City Reds	27–20	Hull	27 March, 17:00 GMT	The Willows	James Child	3,535
Huddersfield Giants	6–24	St Helens	28 March, 15:00 GMT	Galpharm Stadium	Thierry Alibert	9,648

=== Round 9 ===
Home	Score	Away	Match Information
Home	Score	Away	Date and Time	Venue	Referee	Attendance
Leeds Rhinos	20–20	Bradford Bulls	1 April, 20:00 GMT	Headingley Stadium	Phil Bentham	17,244
Huddersfield Giants	48–6	Catalans Dragons	2 April, 19:00 GMT	Galpharm Stadium	Steve Ganson	5,299
Hull KR	14–18	Hull	2 April, 12:45 GMT	New Craven Park	Richard Silverwood	10,089
St Helens	10–18	Wigan Warriors	2 April, 15:00 GMT	GPW Recruitment Stadium	Ben Thaler	17,500
Wakefield Trinity Wildcats	19–6	Castleford Tigers	2 April, 19:30 GMT	Belle Vue	James Child	8,337
Warrington Wolves	32–2	Salford City Reds	2 April, 15:00 GMT	Halliwell Jones Stadium	Thierry Alibert	11,467
Crusaders RL	P–P	Harlequins RL	1 April, 20:00 GMT	Racecourse ground	-	-

=== Round 10 ===
Home	Score	Away	Match Information
Home	Score	Away	Date and Time	Venue	Referee	Attendance
Bradford Bulls	20–16	Crusaders RL	5 April, 15:00 GMT	Grattan Stadium	James Child	7,853
Castleford Tigers	18–52	St Helens	5 April, 15:30 GMT	The Jungle	Phil Bentham	6,879
Catalans Dragons	24–34	Leeds Rhinos	5 April, 17:30 GMT	Stade Aime Giral	Ben Thaler	8,230
Harlequins RL	12–52	Hull KR	5 April, 14:00 GMT	Twickenham Stoop	Thierry Alibert	2,819
Hull	10–29	Warrington Wolves	5 April, 15:15 GMT	KC Stadium	Steve Ganson	14,131
Salford City Reds	30–18	Huddersfield Giants	5 April, 15:00 GMT	The Willows	Ian Smith	4,041
Wigan Warriors	54–14	Wakefield Trinity Wildcats	5 April, 15:00 GMT	DW Stadium	Richard Silverwood	14,615

== Table ==
Pos	Team	Pld	W	D	L	PF	PA	PD	Pts	Qualification
1	Wigan Warriors (L, C)	27	22	0	5	922	411	+511	44	Play-offs
2	St Helens	27	20	0	7	946	547	+399	40	Play-offs
3	Warrington Wolves	27	20	0	7	885	488	+397	40	Play-offs
4	Leeds Rhinos	27	17	1	9	725	561	+164	35	Play-offs
5	Huddersfield Giants	27	16	1	10	758	439	+319	33	Play-offs
6	Hull F.C.	27	16	0	11	569	584	−15	32	Play-offs
7	Hull Kingston Rovers	27	14	1	12	653	632	+21	29	Play-offs
8	Celtic Crusaders	27	12	0	15	547	732	−185	24	Play-offs
9	Castleford Tigers	27	11	0	16	648	766	−118	22	
10	Bradford Bulls	27	9	1	17	528	728	−200	19	
11	Wakefield Trinity Wildcats	27	9	0	18	539	741	−202	18	
12	Salford City Reds	27	8	0	19	448	857	−409	16	
13	Harlequins	27	7	0	20	494	838	−344	14	
14	Catalans Dragons	27	6	0	21	409	747	−338	12	

Source: Rugby League Project
Rules for classification: 1) Points; 2) Points difference; 3) Number of points scored;
(C) Champions; (L) League Leaders' Shield Winners

== Progression table ==
- Numbers highlighted in green indicate that the team finished the round inside the top 8
- Numbers highlighted in blue indicates the team finished first on the ladder in that round
- Numbers highlighted in red indicates the team finished last place on the ladder in that round

	Team	1	2	3	4	5	6	7	8	9	10	11	12	13	14	15	16	17	18	19	20	21	22	23	24	25	26	27
1	Wigan Warriors	2	4	6	8	8	10	12	14	16	18	20	20	22	24	26	28	30	30	32	34	36	36	38	40	40	42	44
2	St Helens R.F.C.	0	2	4	6	6	8	10	12	12	14	16	18	20	20	22	22	24	26	28	28	28	30	32	34	36	38	40
3	Warrington Wolves	2	4	4	6	8	10	10	12	14	16	16	18	20	20	22	24	26	28	28	30	32	34	34	34	36	38	40
4	Leeds Rhinos	0	0	2	4	6	6	6	6	7	9	11	11	13	15	17	19	21	21	23	25	25	27	29	31	31	33	35
5	Huddersfield Giants	2	2	4	4	6	8	10	10	12	12	14	16	16	16	16	18	18	20	21	21	23	25	25	27	29	31	33
6	Hull	2	4	4	6	8	8	10	10	12	12	12	14	14	16	18	20	22	22	24	26	26	28	28	30	32	32	32
7	Hull Kingston Rovers	2	2	2	4	6	6	8	8	8	10	12	12	12	14	14	16	16	18	19	21	23	23	25	27	29	29	29
8	Crusaders RL	0	2	4	4	4	4	6	6	6	6	8	8	10	10	10	12	14	14	14	14	16	18	20	22	22	22	24
9	Castleford Tigers	2	2	2	2	2	4	4	6	6	6	6	8	10	10	10	10	12	14	16	18	18	20	20	20	20	22	22
10	Bradford Bulls	0	0	2	4	6	6	6	8	9	11	13	15	15	17	17	17	17	17	17	17	17	17	17	17	17	19	19
11	Wakefield Trinity Wildcats	2	4	6	6	6	8	10	10	12	12	12	12	12	12	14	14	14	14	16	16	18	18	18	18	18	18	18
12	Salford City Reds	0	0	0	0	0	2	2	4	4	6	6	6	6	8	10	10	10	10	12	12	14	14	14	14	14	14	16
13	Harlequins RL	0	2	2	2	2	2	2	2	2	2	2	4	6	8	8	10	10	10	10	10	12	12	12	12	14	14	14
14	Catalans Dragons	0	0	0	0	2	2	2	4	4	4	4	4	4	4	4	4	4	6	6	6	8	8	10	12	12	12	12

== Play-offs ==
The 2010 Super League play-offs take place in September and October 2010. They decided which two teams will play in the Grand Final.

=== Format ===
Super League has used a play-off system since Super League III in 1998. When introduced, 5 teams qualified for the play-offs, which was subsequently expanded to 6 teams in 2002. The 2010 season will follow the same format as the 2009 season.

Following the final round of matches, all eight play-off teams will be decided. The winning team from week one with the highest League placing will be allowed to select their opponents for week three. Except this choosing opportunity, the new format follows the play-off system of the Australian Football League.

Super League XV play-offs bracket

Qualifying/Elimination playoffs
2	St. Helens	28
3	Warrington Wolves	12
5	Huddersfield Giants	18
8	Crusaders	12
6	Hull	4
7	Hull KR	21
1	Wigan Warriors	26
4	Leeds Rhinos	27

Preliminary semifinals
Warrington Wolves	22
Huddersfield Giants	34
Hull KR	18
Wigan Warriors	42

Qualifying semifinals
St Helens selected Huddersfield
St Helens	42
Huddersfield Giants	22
Leeds Rhinos	6
Wigan Warriors	26

Grand Final
2 October, Old Trafford
St Helens	10
Wigan Warriors	22

Week 1. Qualifying/Elimination play-offs: Fixtures decided by regular reason finishing positions. Higher ranked teams play lower ranked teams. Higher ranked teams receive home ground advantage.
Week 2. Preliminary semi-finals: Fixtures decided by regular season finishing positions. Higher ranked teams play lower ranked teams. Higher ranked teams receive home ground advantage.
Week 3. Qualifying semi-finals: Winners of Qualifying play-offs play winners of Qualifying semi-finals. Fixtures decided by club call. Winners of Qualifying play-offs receive home ground advantage.

=== Qualifying and Elimination Finals ===
Home	Score	Away	Match Information
Home	Score	Away	Date and Time (Local)	Venue	Referee	Crowd
St. Helens	28 – 12	Warrington Wolves	10 September, 8:00pm	GPW Recruitment Stadium	R Silverwood	14,632
Huddersfield Giants	18 – 12	Crusaders RL	11 September, 3:45pm	Galpharm Stadium	B Thaler	5,869
Hull	4 – 21	Hull Kingston Rovers	11 September, 6:00pm	KC Stadium	P Bentham	17,699
Wigan Warriors	26 – 27	Leeds Rhinos	12 September, 6:45pm	DW Stadium	T Alibert	9,987
Eliminated: Crusaders RL, Hull

=== Preliminary Semi-Finals ===
Home	Score	Away	Match Information
Home	Score	Away	Date and Time	Venue	Referee	Crowd
Wigan Warriors	42 – 18	Hull Kingston Rovers	17 September, Time 8:00pm	DW Stadium	R Silverwood	11,133
Warrington Wolves	22 – 34	Huddersfield Giants	18 September, Time 6:15pm	Halliwell Jones Stadium	P Bentham	8,050
Eliminated: Hull KR, Warrington

=== Semi-finals ===
Home	Score	Away	Match Information
Home	Score	Away	Date and Time	Venue	Referee	Crowd
St Helens R.F.C.	42 – 22	Huddersfield Giants	24 September, 8:00pm	GPW Recruitment Stadium	P Bentham	13,510
Leeds Rhinos	6 – 26	Wigan Warriors	25 September, 5:15pm	Headingley Stadium	R Silverwood	13,693
Eliminated: Huddersfield, Leeds

- St Helens as highest ranked qualifying final winner chose their semi-final opponents from the winners of the Preliminary Semi-Finals, picking Huddersfield Giants. This was St Helens' final game at Knowsley Road before moving to Halton Stadium in 2011, and to New St Helens Stadium in 2012
- Leeds, the second highest ranked Qualifying Final winner, faced the other Preliminary Semi-Final winner, Wigan Warriors

=== Grand final ===
Home	Score	Away	Match Information
Home	Score	Away	Date and Time	Venue	Referee	Crowd
St Helens R.F.C.	10 – 22	Wigan Warriors	2 October, 6:00pm	Old Trafford, Manchester	R Silverwood	71,526

== See also ==
- Super League XV
- Super League play-offs

== Notes ==
A. Rearranged fixture to allow Harlequins RL to play their friendly fixture against Melbourne Storm, which coincided with round 3
B. Rearranged fixture to allow Leeds Rhinos to play their 2010 World Club Challenge fixture against Melbourne Storm, which coincided with round 4
