= Jeff Doyle =

Jeff Doyle may refer to:

- Jeff Doyle (baseball), former Major League Baseball second baseman
- Jeff Doyle (footballer), Australian association footballer (soccer) player
- Jeff Doyle (rugby league), Australian rugby league footballer
