= Michael Jackson (rugby league) =

English rugby league footballer (born 1969)

Personal information
- Born: 11 October 1969 (age 56)

Playing information
- Position: Second-row, Loose forward
Club
Years	Team	Pld	T	G	FG	P
1988–91	Hunslet	54	13	0	0	52
1991–93	Wakefield Trinity	15	4	0	0	16
1994–97	Halifax	99	21	0	0	84
1998–00	Sheffield Eagles	46	3	0	0	12
	Total	214	41	0	0	164
Representative
Years	Team	Pld	T	G	FG	P
1991–93	Great Britain	6	2	0	0	8

Michael Jackson (born 11 October 1969) is a former professional rugby league footballer who played in the 1980s and 1990s. He played at representative level for Great Britain, and at club level for Hunslet, Wakefield Trinity, Halifax and Sheffield Eagles, as a second-row or loose forward.

== Career ==
Jackson started his professional career with Hunslet before being signed by Wakefield Trinity in 1991 for a fee of £60,000. In July 1993, Jackson signed a two-year contract with Halifax.

Jackson was signed by Sheffield Eagles in January 1998 for a fee of £28,000. He appeared as a substitute in Sheffield Eagles' 17–8 victory over Wigan Warriors in the 1998 Challenge Cup Final during Super League III at Wembley Stadium, London on Saturday 2 May 1998. Following the club's merger with Huddersfield Giants in 1999, he joined the newly-formed Sheffield Eagles club ahead of the 2000 Northern Ford Premiership season.

=== International honours ===
Jackson won caps for Great Britain while at Wakefield Trinity in 1991 against Papua New Guinea, in 1992 against France, Australia (sub), and New Zealand (sub), and while at Halifax in 1993 against New Zealand (2 matches) (sub). He was selected to go on the 1992 Great Britain Lions tour of Australia and New Zealand.
