= 1998 Challenge Cup =

Rugby league competition

1998 Silk Cut Challenge Cup
- Duration: 8 Rounds
- Highest attendance: 60,669
- Broadcast partners: (United Kingdom) BBC Sport
- Winners: Sheffield Eagles
- Runners-up: Wigan Warriors
- Lance Todd Trophy: Mark Aston

The 1998 Challenge Cup, known as the Silk Cut Challenge Cup for sponsorship reasons, was the 97th staging of the Challenge Cup, a rugby league cup competition.

The competition ended with the final on 2 May 1998, which was played at Wembley Stadium.

The tournament was won by Sheffield Eagles, who beat Wigan Warriors 17–8 in the final, and is generally considered to be one of the biggest upsets in the history of the Challenge Cup final. The Lance Todd Trophy was won by Mark Aston.

== First round ==
The first round consisted of 60 teams, including clubs in National Conference Division 1 and Division 2, and other amateur clubs from around the country. Additionally, Dublin Blues became the first ever Irish team to take part in the cup. Matches were played on 5–6 December 1997, with the replay being played on 13 December 1997.

Tie no	Home team	Score	Away team
1	Worth Village	32–4	Fulham Travellers
2	Charleston	w/o	West London Colonials
Walkover for Charleston – West London Colonials withdrew
3	West Bowling	18–24	Thornhill
4	Redhill	36–12	Wigan St Judes
5	Oulton	36–16	Loughborough University
6	Wigan Rose Bridge	w/o	Kells
Walkover for Wigan Rose Bridge – Kells withdrew
7	Normanton	14–14	Folly Lane
Replay	Folly Lane	22–15	Normanton
8	Leigh East	18–4	East Hull
9	Skirlaugh	w/o	Blackpool Gladiators
Walkover for Skirlaugh – Blackpool Gladiators withdrew
10	Moldgreen	18–8	Barrow Island
11	Blackbrook	17–23	Haydock
12	Dewsbury Moor	32–7	Dublin Blues
13	Teesside Steelers	10–48	Leeds University
14	New Earswick All Blacks	6–34	BRK
15	Milford	6–16	Queens
16	London Skolars	10–12	Myton
17	Ideal ABI	5–30	Hunslet Warriors
18	Ellenborough	40–14	Crosfields
19	Siddal	40–6	Lindley Swifts
20	Eccles	12–26	Featherstone Lions
21	Broughton Red Rose	14–24	Hull Dockers
22	Millom	22–2	York Acorn
23	Ovenden	18–16	Dodworth
24	Waterhead	28–4	Westgate Redoubt
25	Stanningley	50–16	Nottingham Crusaders
26	Shaw Cross	0–20	Clayton
27	Farnworth	26–12	Lowca
28	Queensbury	24–16	East Leeds
29	John Moores Univ	16–40	Eastmoor
30	Norland	w/o	Westfield
Walkover for Norland – Westfield withdrew

== Second round ==
The 30 winners of the previous round were joined by an additional 14 clubs from the National Conference Premier Division. Matches were played on 20–21 December 1997, with the replay and postponed matches being played on 27–28 December 1997.

Tie no	Home team	Score	Away team
1	Charleston	8–34	Saddleworth Rangers
2	Eastmoor Dragons	40–8	Leeds University
3	Worth Village	4–52	Thornhill
4	Moldgreen	22–20	Siddal
5	Redhill	14–19	Castleford Lock Lane
6	Folly Lane	37–14	Askam
7	Hunslet Warriors	14–6	Millom
8	BRK	20–18	Leigh East
9	Walney Central	12–12	Leigh Miners Rangers
Replay	Leigh Miners Rangers	46–4	Walney Central
10	Woolston Rovers	22–0	Oldham St Annes
11	Haydock	11–0	Waterhead
12	Stanningley	10–37	Farnworth
13	Wigan Rose Bridge	8–37	West Hull
14	Myton Warriors	0–52	Norland
15	Ellenborough Rangers	28–22	Queensbury
16	Dudley Hill	14–42	Skirlaugh Bulls
17	Queens	42–18	Beverley
18	Heworth	12–4	Clayton
19	Ovenden	30–22	Wigan St Patricks
20	Dewsbury Moor	8–27	Oulton Raiders
21	Rochdale Mayfield	4–28	Featherstone Lions
22	Egremont Rangers	22–12	Hull Dockers

=== Play-off ===
An additional play-off match between Oldham R.L.F.C. and one of the winners of the second round took place before the next round. This was due to Oldham being originally excluded from the cup, as the original club had been liquidated at the end of the previous season, but the Rugby Football League (RFL) later allowed the club to enter the competition following an appeal, with several of the remaining amateur clubs in the competition offering to play Oldham for a place in the next round. The match took place on 18 January 1998.

Tie no	Home team	Score	Away team	Attendance
1	Oldham R.L.F.C.	36–14	Heworth	2,943

== Third round ==
The 22 winners of the previous round were joined by an additional 18 clubs from the First Division and Second Division. Matches were played on 31 January and 1 February 1998.

Tie no	Home team	Score	Away team	Attendance
1	Keighley Cougars	66–16	Saddleworth Rangers	3,116
2	York	37–5	Norland	965
3	Rochdale Hornets	44–4	Leigh Miners Rangers	737
4	Doncaster Dragons	18–23	Featherstone Lions	1,012
5	Wakefield Trinity	44–6	BRK	1,369
6	Swinton Lions	74–6	Folly Lane	2,425
7	Widnes Vikings	48–8	Oldham R.L.F.C.	4,500
8	Dewsbury Rams	40–2	Thornhill	2,355
9	Hull Kingston Rovers	34–16	Queens	1,584
10	Lancashire Lynx	46–0	West Hull	488
11	Workington Town	12–8	Haydock	1,139
12	Bramley	10–16	Ellenborough Rangers	500
13	Featherstone Rovers	56–0	Woolston Rovers	1,126
14	Batley Bulldogs	44–2	Oulton Raiders	849
15	Hunslet Hawks	44–12	Skirlaugh Bulls	830
16	Barrow	52–8	Farnworth	927
17	Leigh Centurions	44–4	Hunslet Warriors	1,259
18	Whitehaven Warriors	48–7	Castleford Lock Lane	830
19	Eastmoor Dragons	14–20	Egremont Rangers	600
20	Mold Green	10–20	Ovenden	900

== Fourth round ==
The 20 winners of the previous round were joined by an additional 12 clubs from the Super League. Matches were played on 14–15 February 1998, with the replay being played on 18 February 1998.

Tie no	Home team	Score	Away team	Attendance
1	Egremont Rangers	18–0	Workington Town	3,054
2	Barrow	22–36	Widnes Vikings	2,415
3	Lancashire Lynx	28–28	Dewsbury Rams	756
Replay	Dewsbury Rams	31–14	Lancashire Lynx	850
4	Halifax Blue Sox	28–8	Huddersfield Giants	5,862
5	Leeds Rhinos	12–15	Castleford Tigers	7,067
6	Batley Bulldogs	20–44	London Broncos	956
7	Leigh Centurions	11–66	Sheffield Eagles	1,391
8	Wakefield Trinity	6–42	Warrington Wolves	2,844
9	Featherstone Lions	20–56	Hull Kingston Rovers	1,913
10	Ellenborough Rangers	14–12	Hunslet Hawks	1,338
11	Rochdale Hornets	10–48	Bradford Bulls	5,466
12	Swinton Lions	39–21	York	780
13	Ovenden	0–74	Salford Reds	1,415
14	Whitehaven Warriors	12–26	Hull Sharks	2,030
15	Keighley Cougars	0–76	Wigan Warriors	4,700
16	Featherstone Rovers	24–56	St. Helens	2,759

== Fifth round ==
Matches were played on 28 February and 1 March 1998.

Tie no	Home team	Score	Away team	Attendance
1	Hull Sharks	78–0	Ellenborough Rangers	3,013
2	Dewsbury Rams	0–56	Wigan Warriors	3,350
3	Widnes Vikings	6–48	Salford Reds	5,000
4	St. Helens	35–22	Warrington Wolves	8,499
5	London Broncos	21–18	Halifax Blue Sox	3,092
6	Sheffield Eagles	84–6	Egremont Rangers	2,500
7	Hull Kingston Rovers	46–24	Swinton Lions	2,551
8	Castleford Tigers	26–21	Bradford Bulls	10,283

== Quarter finals ==
Matches were played on 14–15 March 1998.

Tie no	Home team	Score	Away team	Attendance
1	London Broncos	46–18	Hull Kingston Rovers	4,111
2	Salford Reds	41–10	Hull Sharks	6,210
3	Castleford Tigers	22–32	Sheffield Eagles	7,467
4	Wigan Warriors	22–10	St. Helens	17,179

== Semi finals ==
The semi finals were played at neutral venues on 28 and 29 March 1998. Sheffield Eagles won 22–18 against Salford Reds, reaching the Challenge Cup final for the first time in their history, but the match was overshadowed when a man invaded the pitch and attacked referee Stuart Cummings immediately after the end of the game. Wigan Warriors won 38–8 in a one-sided game against London Broncos.

28 March 1998

Sheffield Eagles	22 – 18	Salford Reds
Tries: Taewa, Jackson, Aston, Laughton; Goals: Aston (3)	Report	Tries: Rogers, White, Edwards; Goals: Blakeley (2); Drop goals: Crompton, Blakeley

Headingley, Leeds
Attendance: 6,961
Referee: Stuart Cummings

29 March 1998

London Broncos	8 – 38	Wigan Warriors
Tries: Fatnowna, Mardon	Report	Tries: Moore (2), Radlinski (2), Bell, Robinson; Goals: Farrell (7)

Alfred McAlpine Stadium, Huddersfield
Attendance: 11,058
Referee: Russell Smith

== Final ==
2 May 1998

Sheffield Eagles	17 – 8	Wigan Warriors
Tries: Pinkney, Crowther, Turner; Goals: Aston (2); Drop goals: Aston	Report	Tries: Bell; Goals: Farrell (2)

Wembley Stadium, London
Attendance: 60,669
Referee: Stuart Cummings

FB	1	Waisale Sovatabua
RW	2	Nick Pinkney
RC	3	Whetu Taewa
LC	4	Keith Senior
LW	6	Matt Crowther
SO	22	Dave Watson
SH	7	Mark Aston
PR	8	Paul Broadbent (c)
HK	9	Johnny Lawless
PR	10	Dale Laughton
SR	11	Paul Carr
SR	12	Darren Shaw
LF	19	Rod Doyle
Substitutions:
IC	24	Martin Wood
IC	25	Lynton Stott
IC	15	Darren Turner
IC	17	Michael Jackson
Coach:
John Kear

FB	1	Kris Radlinski
RW	5	Mark Bell
RC	4	Gary Connolly
LC	3	Danny Moore
LW	2	Jason Robinson
SO	6	Henry Paul
SH	7	Tony Smith
PR	10	Tony Mestrov
HK	9	Robbie McCormack
PR	17	Stephen Holgate
SR	11	Denis Betts
SR	12	Simon Haughton
LF	13	Andy Farrell (c)
Substitutions:
IC	8	Neil Cowie
IC	20	Lee Gilmour
IC	16	Terry O'Connor
IC	14	Mick Cassidy
Coach:
John Monie
