= Ricky Wright (rugby league) =

English rugby league footballer

Personal information
- Full name: Ricky Wright
- Born: 15 March 1978 (age 48) Workington, Cumbria, England
- Height: 187 cm (6 ft 2 in)

Playing information
- Position: forward Centre, Prop, Loose forward
Club
Years	Team	Pld	T	G	FG	P
1997–01	Sheffield Eagles	42	0	0	0	0
2002	Saint-Estève
2002–07	Workington Town	103	15	0	0	0
2007–08	Whitehaven RLFC	27	0	0	0	0
	Total	172	15	0	0	0
- As of 25 May 2021

Ricky Wright is a former professional rugby league footballer who played as a centre or in the second-row for Whitehaven in National League One and for the Sheffield Eagles in the Super League.

Ricky played in the Super League for three seasons with Leeds Rhinos and the Sheffield Eagles and also playing a season in France for French outfit St Esteve before they merged and were renamed the Catalans Dragons in 2006. Ricky moved back to his roots in West Cumbria in 2002 and went on to play semi-professional for Cumbrian clubs Workington Town and Whitehaven.

Ricky Wright retired from Rugby League in 2008 at the age of 30 due work commitments.

In 2009-2011 Ricky Wright took over the first team coaches position of his former Amateur team Seaton Rangers currently playing the rugby in the Cumberland league.Taking time out from the game Ricky returned to his local club again in 2021 to coach Seaton Rangers u11s
