= Mark Bell (rugby league) =

Australian rugby league footballer

Personal information
- Born: 19 March 1967 (age 59) Australian Capital Territory

Playing information
- Position: Fullback, Centre, Wing
Club
Years	Team	Pld	T	G	FG	P
1988–91	Canberra Raiders	50	15	3	0	66
1992–93	Western Suburbs	34	18	0	0	72
1994	Penrith Panthers	7	1	0	0	4
1995–97	St George Dragons	52	24	9	1	115
1998	Wigan Warriors	22	12	0	0	48
	Total	165	70	12	1	305

Mark Bell (born 19 March 1967) is an Australian former professional rugby league footballer who played in the 1980s and 1990s.

He played for Canberra, Western Suburbs, Penrith, and St. George in Australia, along with a spell with English club Wigan Warriors in the Super League as a wing or centre.

== Career ==
A Canberra junior with Yass and Belconnen United, Bell made his début for the Raiders from the bench in 1988, but it was to be his only appearance for the club that year. The following year, he played his first game in the starting line-up, scoring a try against Manly at Brookvale Oval.

Bell was named on the bench without playing in the match for both the 1989 and 1990 Grand Finals. However, he played centre in the 1991 Grand Final loss to Penrith.

Bell joined the Magpies in 1992 under coach Warren Ryan. He had an immediate impact, scoring tries in his first 4 matches. He scored 16 tries throughout the year to be the season's highest try-scorer (equal with Tim Brasher).

After an unsuccessful season with the Panthers in 1994, during which he played only 7 games, Bell joined the St George Dragons. He was with the club for 3 seasons, scoring 24 tries. He scored 4 tries in the 1996 semi-final series and played on the wing in the 1996 Grand Final loss to Manly.

Bell played a final season with Wigan in 1998's Super League III. Wigan lost only one match that year, and Bell played wing in the side, winning the 1998 Super League Grand Final, beating the Leeds Rhinos 10–4.

Bell still lives and works in the Canberra region. He has coached local teams Queanbeyan Kangaroos and the Yass Magpies.
