= Rod Doyle =

Australian rugby league footballer

Personal information
- Full name: Rod Doyle
- Born: 18 July 1969 (age 57)

Playing information
- Position: Five-eighth, Lock
Club
Years	Team	Pld	T	G	FG	P
1990	St. George	7	12	0	0	28
1992–93	Eastern Suburbs	10	0	1	0	2
1995–96	South Queensland	7	2	0	0	8
1997–99	Sheffield	68	12	0	0	48
	Total	92	26	1	0	86
- Source: As of 22 August 2026
- Relatives: Jeff Doyle (brother)

Rod Doyle is an Australian former professional rugby league footballer who played in the 1990s. He played for Eastern Suburbs, St. George and South Queensland in the NSWRL/ARL competitions and for Sheffield in the Super League

== Background ==
Doyle is the younger brother of former professional rugby league player Jeff Doyle.

== Playing career ==
Doyle made his first grade debut for St. George in round 11 of the 1990 NSWRL season against Western Suburbs. Doyle only played seven games for St. George before transferring to Eastern Suburbs. Doyle played a total of ten games with Easts before signing with the newly admitted South Queensland team for the 1995 ARL season. Doyle made his club debut for South Queensland in round 22 against defending premiers Canberra which ended in a 58-4 loss. The following year, Doyle played six games for the club as they finished with the Wooden Spoon. In 1997, he signed for English side Sheffield. Doyle played at lock for Sheffield in their 1998 Challenge Cup final victory over Wigan. It is considered one of the biggest upsets in the competitions history. Doyle played a total of 68 games for Sheffield and departed the club at the end of the 1999 season.
