= Keith Senior =

GB & England international rugby league footballer

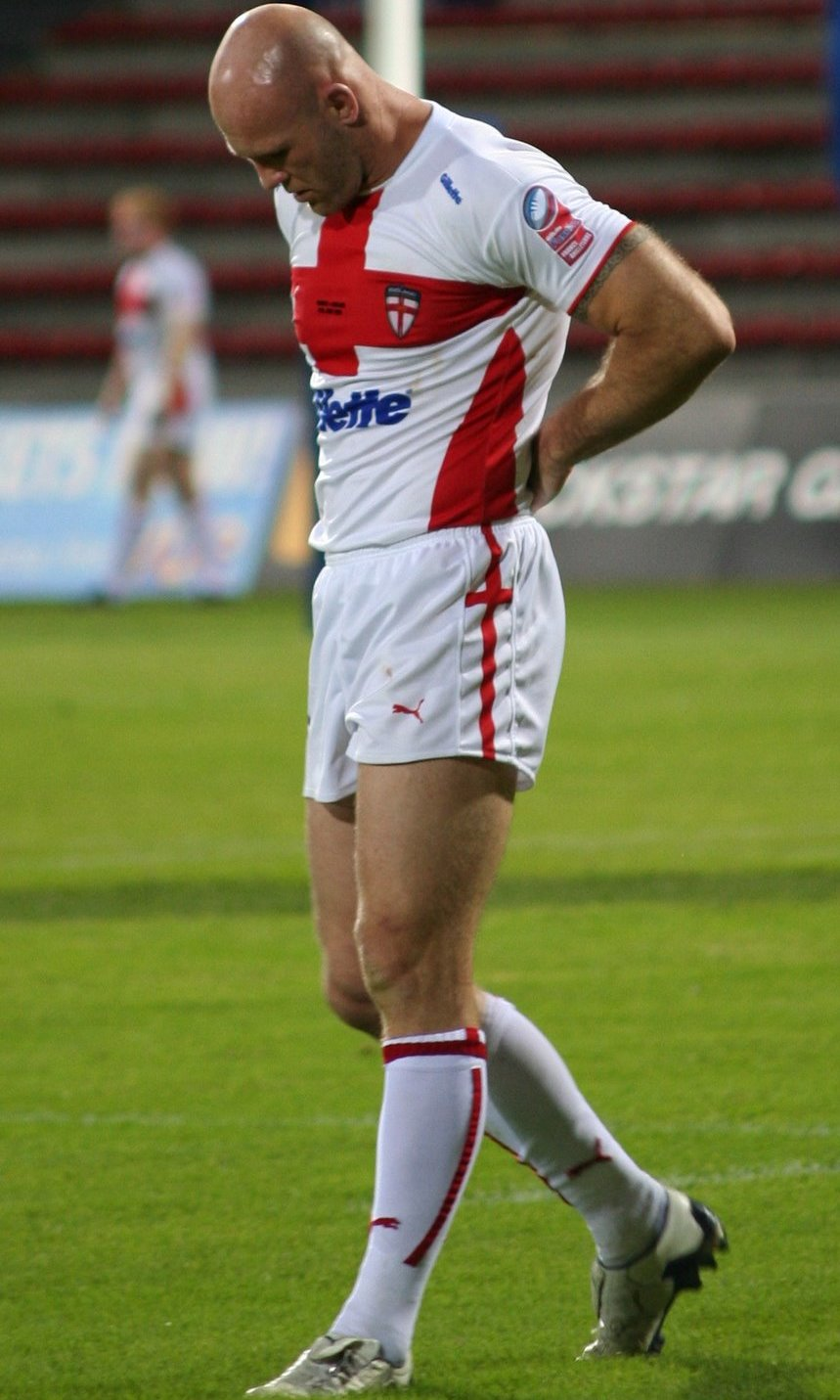

Personal information
- Full name: Keith Andrew Senior
- Born: 24 April 1976 (age 50) Huddersfield, West Yorkshire, England

Playing information
- Height: 6 ft 3 in (191 cm)
- Weight: 15 st 9 lb (99 kg)
- Position: Centre
Club
Years	Team	Pld	T	G	FG	P
1994–99	Sheffield Eagles	140	56	0	0	224
1999–11	Leeds Rhinos	365	171	0	0	684
	Total	505	227	0	0	908
Representative
Years	Team	Pld	T	G	FG	P
2001–03	Yorkshire	4	4	0	0	16
2000–08	England	10	2	0	0	8
1996–07	Great Britain	33	12	0	0	48

Keith Andrew Senior (born 24 April 1976) is an English former professional rugby league footballer who played for the Sheffield Eagles and the Leeds Rhinos in the Super League. A Great Britain and England international representative centre, he is considered one of the greatest players of the Super League era.

He won every major competition in the domestic game and held the records for the most Super League appearances (413) and tries (199), until 2012. He represented Great Britain and England at international level, and was named in the 'Rugby League World XIII' three times.

== Background ==
Senior was born in Huddersfield, West Yorkshire, England.

== Playing career ==
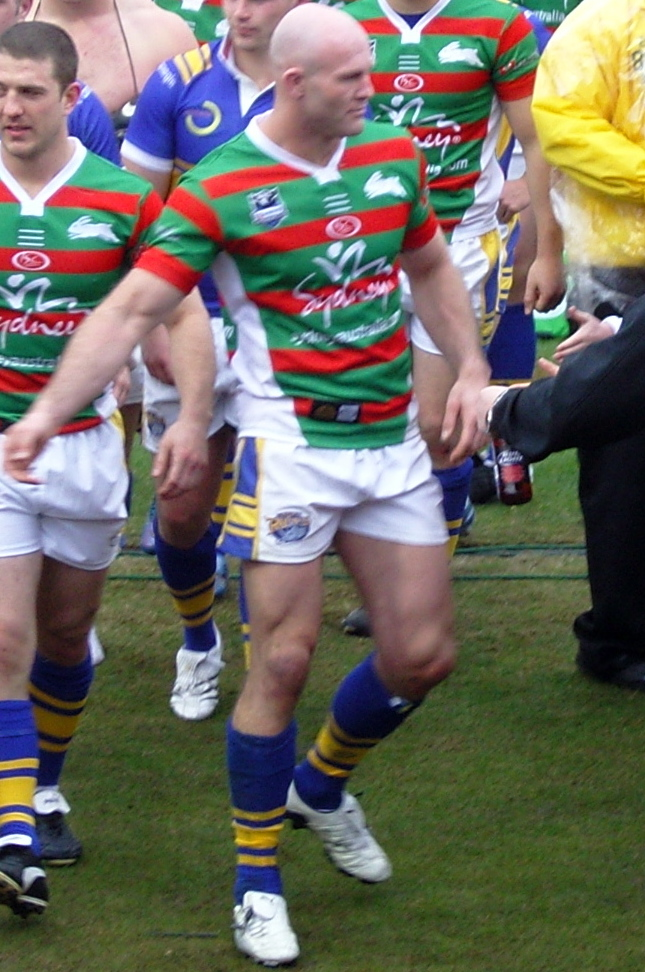
Senior post match against the South Sydney Rabbitohs

=== Sheffield Eagles ===
Senior began his career at the Sheffield Eagles. He was signed from Huddersfield YMCA Rugby Union team by Gary Hetherington in 1994. Senior played in the very first Super League match in 1996, a 30–24 defeat by Paris Saint-Germain. Senior played at centre in Sheffield Eagles' 17–8 victory over Wigan in the 1998 Challenge Cup Final during Super League III at Wembley Stadium, London on Saturday 2 May 1998. He was also his club's top try scorer with 17 tries that season. He bettered that tally in 1998, when he scored 19 tries as the Eagles shocked the Rugby league world, beating the Wigan Warriors 17–8 in the Challenge Cup Final at the old Wembley Stadium.

Senior made 140 appearances for the Eagles and scored 56 tries during his six seasons at the club. Notably, two of those tries came against his future employer, the Leeds Rhinos.

=== Leeds Rhinos ===
Senior signed for the Rhinos on the final day of the 1999 Super League regular season. He made his début for the club on the same day, against the London Broncos. After a quiet start to his Rhinos career, Senior burst into life in 2000 finishing the season as joint top try scorer with 18, including four in a single match against the then Halifax Blue Sox.

In 2003 Senior was named the Leeds Rhinos Players' Player of the Year.

In 2004 Senior made 30 appearances and scored 13 tries as the Rhinos ended their 32-year wait for the Championship, beating the Bradford Bulls 16–8 in the 2004 Super League Grand Final. By this time Senior held the record of playing the most Super League rounds of any player, with 223 out of a possible 237. On 23 December 2004 the Rugby Football League fined Senior along with Leeds' teammate Ryan Bailey £1,500 each after they tested positive to the banned stimulant ephedrine.

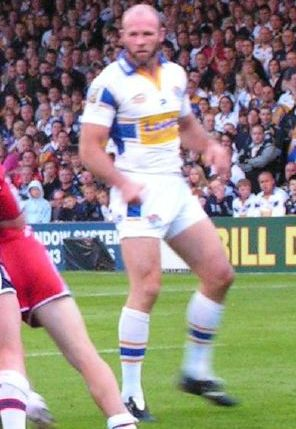
Senior playing for Leeds in 2007

As Super League IX champions, the Rhinos faced 2004 NRL season premiers, the Canterbury-Bankstown Bulldogs in the 2005 World Club Challenge. Senior played at centre in Leeds' 39–32 victory. In 2005 Senior became only the 20th player in the club's history to score 100 tries in his career. Senior played for the Rhinos in the 2005 Challenge Cup Final at centre in their loss against Hull FC.

In January 2007 Senior celebrated his Testimonial match for the Rhinos with a 50–0 thrashing of his home town club, the Huddersfield Giants. Senior scored a late try in the match.

Senior was an integral part of the Rhinos squad that won the Super League Grand Final for three consecutive seasons in 2007, 2008 and 2009, all against St. Helens. During the 2009 season, Senior became the first player to reach 500 Super League appearances.

In 2009 Arriva Yorkshire asked local members of the public to nominate the thirteen best ever Rugby League players to have played in West Yorkshire as the 'Arriva Yorkshire Rugby League Dream Team'.
Senior made the final thirteen, along with Rugby League greats Trevor Foster MBE, Neil Fox MBE, Albert Goldthorpe, Alan Hardisty, Lewis Jones, Stan Kielty, Roger Millward MBE, Malcolm Reilly, Garry Schofield, David Topliss, Dave Valentine and Adrian Vowles.
A ceremony was held in August 2009 at The Jungle, the home of the Castleford Tigers. A fleet of new buses were named after all the players.

He played in the 2009 Super League Grand Final victory over St. Helens at Old Trafford.

He played in the 2010 Challenge Cup Final defeat by the Warrington Wolves at Wembley Stadium.

At the end of the 2010 season Senior was named in the Super League Dream Team for the fifth time in his career.

=== Crusaders RL ===
On 7 July 2011 it was announced Senior was to join the Crusaders on a 2-year deal from 2012 making 2011's Super League XVI his last season for the Leeds Rhinos.

However, on 26 July 2011 the Crusaders withdrew from the Super League. Keith Senior retired as a professional rugby league footballer shortly afterwards.

=== Representative honours ===
Senior made his Great Britain début in 1996, scoring a try after coming off the bench in the 72–4 win over Fiji. He also made his first start for Great Britain in 1998, against New Zealand.

Senior represented England at the 2000 Rugby League World Cup.

Senior also represented Yorkshire in the now defunct 'War of the Roses' Origin Series, against cross-Pennine rivals Lancashire. Senior played in three consecutive defeats in 2001 and 2002, twice at Headingley, scoring two tries. In 2003 Yorkshire beat Lancashire. Senior scored two tries in the 56–6 victory at Odsal Stadium.

Senior was selected in the Great Britain team to compete in the end of season 2004 Rugby League Tri-Nations tournament. In the final against Australia he played at centre in the Lions' 44–4 loss.

In 2007, Senior played in all three Test matches during the 3–0 series whitewash over New Zealand.

Senior was selected for the England squad to compete in the 2008 Rugby League World Cup tournament in Australia. Group A's first match against Papua New Guinea he played at centre in England's victory. He announced his retirement from international rugby in February 2009.

== Coaching career ==
On 6 March 2015 it was announced Senior had signed a 3-year contract with Sheffield Eagles. The role will consist of First Team Coaching along with work with the community and aspects commercial side of the club.

On 18 November 2025 it was announced Senior had become Director of Rugby at Championship side Hunslet.

== Post-playing career ==
=== Leeds Rugby Foundation ===
When his contract with the Crusaders didn't work out, in May 2011, Senior started work with the Leeds Rugby Foundation. He was involved with charity work and helped the Leeds Rugby Community at a Grass Roots Level. He left to join Sheffield Eagles as a coach in 2015.

=== RugbyAM ===
In December 2013, Senior started Co Presenting RugbyAM, a television programme which was broadcast on Made in Leeds. He works on the programme with presenter Alex Simmons and fellow co-presenter Jamie Jones-Buchanan. The programme interviews Rugby League players (past & present) and reports of all aspects of the game of Rugby League.
