= Martin Wood (rugby league) =

English professional rugby league footballer

Personal information
- Full name: Martin Wood
- Born: 24 June 1970 (age 54)

Playing information
- Position: Stand-off, Loose forward
Club
Years	Team	Pld	T	G	FG	P
1988–91	Halifax
1991–92	Scarborough Pirates
1992–96	Keighley Cougars
1997–98	Sheffield Eagles	47	6	18	2	62
1999–01	Keighley Cougars	68	31	275	1	675
2002	Workington Town	25	8	1	0	34
2002	Hull Kingston Rovers	6	0	0	0	0
	Total	146	45	294	3	771

Coaching information
Club
Years	Team	Gms	W	D	L	W%
2002	Workington Town	0	0	0	0

Martin Wood (born 24 June 1970) is a former professional rugby league footballer who played in the 1980s, 1990s and 2000s who played as a stand-off or loose forward for Halifax, Scarborough Pirates, Keighley Cougars, Sheffield Eagles and Workington Town.

== Career ==
Wood started his career at Halifax, helping the club achieve promotion from the Second Division in 1990–91. He was deemed surplus to requirements during the following season, and was sold to Scarborough Pirates in October 1991. Wood then joined Keighley Cougars in 1992.

In January 1997, Wood and his team-mate Nick Pinkney were signed by Super League side Sheffield Eagles in exchange for £95,000 plus Mark Gamson. He spent two seasons at Sheffield. Wood appeared as a substitute in Sheffield Eagles' 17–8 victory over Wigan in the 1998 Challenge Cup Final at Wembley Stadium, London on Saturday 2 May 1998.

He returned to Keighley in 1999. During his second spell at the club, he was named the Northern Ford Premiership Player of the Year in 2000, and reached a career total of 1,000 points in January 2001. He finished his professional career with Workington Town in 2002. He continued playing and coaching rugby at amateur level, helping Sharlston Rovers achieve a shock win against Dewsbury Rams in the third round of the 2004 Challenge Cup.

In 2011, Wood was inducted into Keighley's Hall of Fame.
