= Dominic Brambani =

Italy international rugby league footballer

Dom Brambani
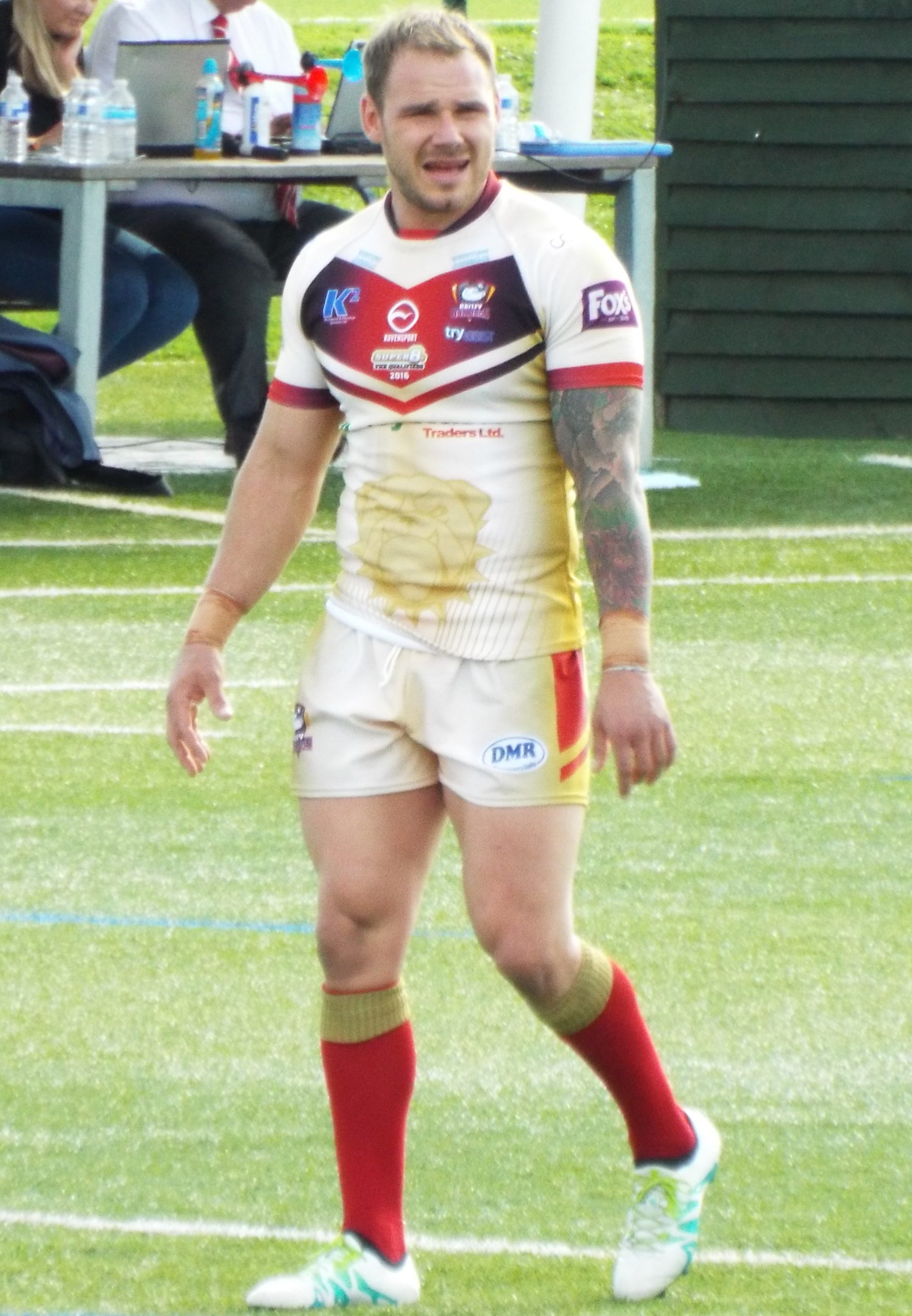

Personal information
- Full name: Dominic Brambani
- Born: 10 May 1985 (age 40) Bradford, West Yorkshire, England

Playing information
- Height: 5 ft 9 in (1.76 m)
- Weight: 13 st 5 lb (85 kg)
- Position: Scrum-half, Stand-off
Club
| Years | Team | Pld | T | G | FG | P |
|---|---|---|---|---|---|---|
| 2004–05 | Castleford Tigers | 8 | 0 | 0 | 0 | 0 |
| 2005 | Featherstone Rovers | 7 | 1 | 0 | 0 | 4 |
| 2006 | Halifax | 21 | 3 | 24 | 0 | 60 |
| 2007–08 | Sheffield Eagles | 51 | 4 | 32 | 3 | 83 |
| 2010–11 | Dewsbury Rams | 52 | 19 | 106 | 3 | 291 |
| 2012–15 | Sheffield Eagles | 125 | 26 | 336 | 4 | 780 |
| 2016–19 | Batley Bulldogs | 109 | 30 | 48 | 6 | 222 |
| 2020–21 | Hunslet | 17 | 4 | 64 | 1 | 145 |
| | Total | 390 | 87 | 610 | 17 | 1585 |
Representative
| Years | Team | Pld | T | G | FG | P |
| 2010 | Italy |

Dominic Brambani (born 10 May 1985) is a former Italian international rugby league footballer who played as a scrum-half or stand-off. He played for the Castleford Tigers in the Super League and 2005's National League One. Brambani also played for Halifax, Sheffield Eagles in two separate spells, Dewsbury Rams, Batley Bulldogs and Hunslet.Dominic is now playing at cleckheaton RUFC with his hero mickey Hayward

== Background ==
Brambani was born in Bradford, West Yorkshire, England.

== Playing career ==
Brambani was a Great Britain Student RLFC captain when the side toured Australia in 2003. After a successful season in the Gold Coast Bycroft Cup League, Brambani was voted the Gold Coast Player of the year and won the Best Back and Top Points Scorer at his club Hinterland Storm. He also gained two representative honours, playing for the Gold Coast Vikings, and the South East Queensland Kookaburras.

Brambani has previously played for the Castleford Tigers in the Super League and Halifax. He returned to England and signed for the 2010 season at the Dewsbury Rams in the Co-operative championship.

In a recent interview, Brambani stated that signing for the Batley Bulldogs was the best decision he ever made

In November 2019, it was announced that Brambani had signed for Hunslet RLFC.

He announced his retirement at the end of the 2021 season.
