= Johnny Lawless =

England & Ireland international rugby league footballer

Personal information
- Full name: John Lawless
- Born: 3 November 1974 (age 51)

Playing information
Club
Years	Team	Pld	T	G	FG	P
1992–95	Halifax
1995–99	Sheffield Eagles
2000	Huddersfield-Sheffield Giants	26	3	0	0	12
2001–03	Halifax	79	12	0	0	48
	Total	105	15	0	0	60
Representative
Years	Team	Pld	T	G	FG	P
1996	England	2	0	0	0	0
1998–01	Ireland	8	1	0	0	4

John "Johnny" Lawless (born 3 November 1974) is a rugby league footballer who played in the 1990s and 2000s. He played at representative level for England, and Ireland, and at club level for Halifax (two spells), Sheffield Eagles and Huddersfield-Sheffield Giants.

== Club career ==
Lawless started his career at Halifax, making his début in 1992. He joined Sheffield Eagles in 1995. Lawless played hooker in Sheffield Eagles' 17–8 victory over Wigan in the 1998 Challenge Cup Final during Super League III at Wembley Stadium, London on Saturday 2 May 1998.

After spending the season with Huddersfield following the club's merger with Sheffield, Lawless returned to Halifax in 2000. He retired in January 2004. Since retirement, Johnny has gone on to found, Minds Matter, a company who delivers Mental Health First Aid training, the company's main aims are to spread Mental Health Awareness and reduce Stigma. Along with his Colleague, Johnny has presented across Britain to both healthcare and non-healthcare establishments.

== Representative career ==
Lawless was an Ireland international and played at the 2000 Rugby League World Cup.
