= Pat Walker (rugby league) =

English Rugby league player

Pat "Patch" Walker
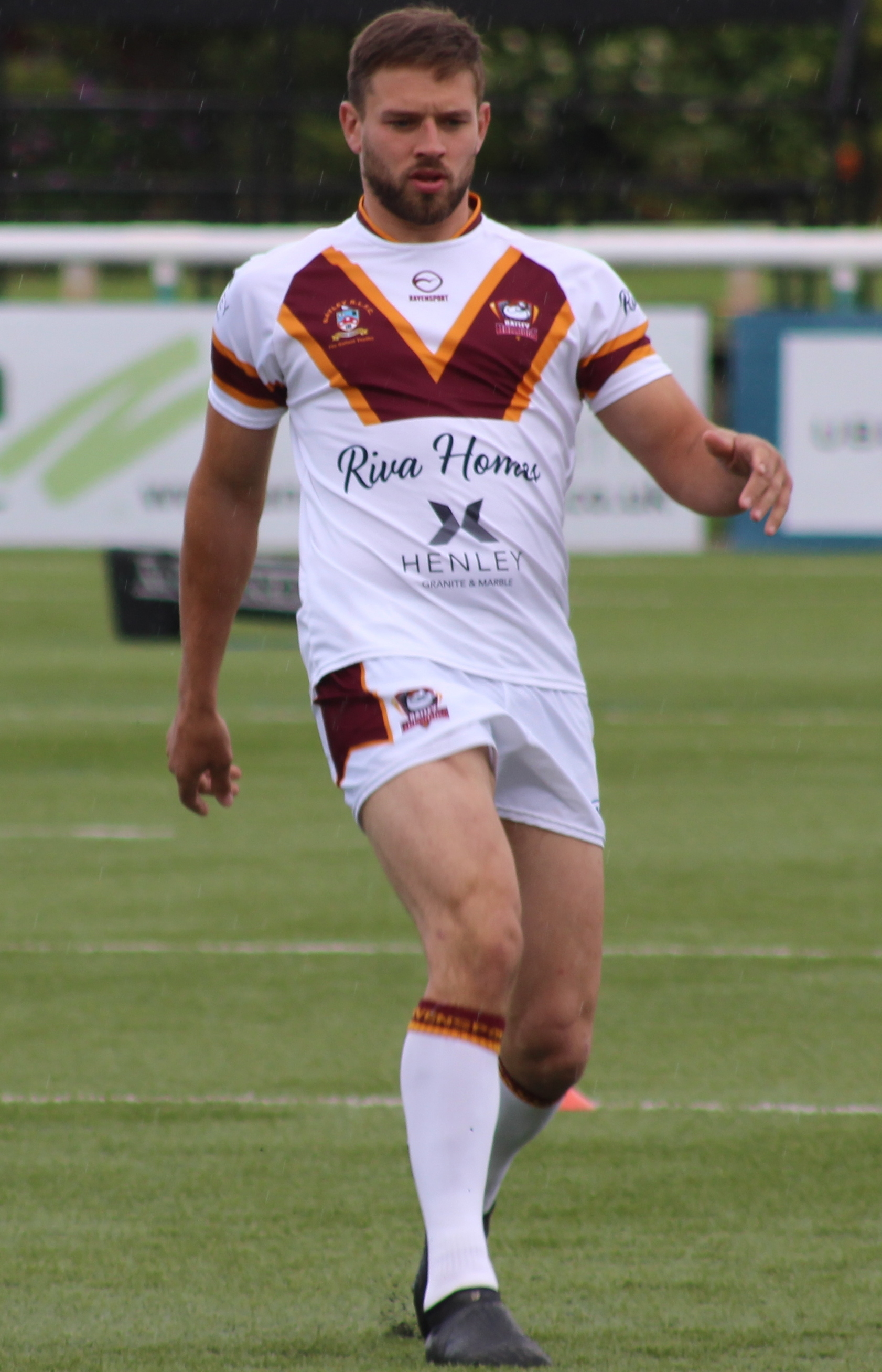

Personal information
- Full name: Patrick Walker
- Born: 24 March 1986 (age 39)
- Height: 6 ft 0 in (1.83 m)
- Weight: 15 st 1 lb (96 kg)

Playing information
- Position: Stand-off, Loose forward
Club
Years	Team	Pld	T	G	FG	P
2009–12	Dewsbury Rams	85	21	284	0	652
2013–15	Sheffield Eagles	85	20	70	3	223
2016–18	Batley Bulldogs	73	8	229	2	492
2019	Sheffield Eagles	33	2	125	0	258
2022	Hunslet R.L.F.C.	6	0	16	0	32
	Total	282	51	724	5	1657
- Source: As of 7 January 2023

Pat Walker (born 24 March 1986) is a former professional rugby league footballer who last played as a stand-off or loose forward for Hunslet RLFC in the RFL League 1.

He played for the Dewsbury Rams in Championship 1 and the Championship, and the Sheffield Eagles in two separate spells and the Batley Bulldogs in the Championship.
