= Dale Laughton =

GB & Scotland rugby league footballer

Personal information
- Born: 10 January 1970 (age 55); Barnsley, South Yorkshire, England

Playing information
- Height: 6 ft 2 in (1.87 m)
- Weight: 16 st 3 lb (103 kg)
- Position: Prop
Club
| Years | Team | Pld | T | G | FG | P |
|---|---|---|---|---|---|---|
| 1992–99 | Sheffield Eagles | 156 | 11 | 0 | 0 | 44 |
| 2000 | Huddersfield-Sheffield | 25 | 3 | 0 | 0 | 12 |
| 2001 | Huddersfield Giants | 17 | 1 | 0 | 0 | 4 |
| 2002 | Warrington Wolves | 18 | 0 | 0 | 0 | 0 |
| | Total | 216 | 15 | 0 | 0 | 60 |
Representative
| Years | Team | Pld | T | G | FG | P |
| 1997–00 | Scotland | 4 | 0 | 0 | 0 | 0 |
| 1998–99 | Great Britain | 5 | 0 | 0 | 0 | 0 |

Dale Laughton (born 10 October 1970) is a former professional rugby league footballer who played in the 1990s and 2000s. He played at representative level for Great Britain and Scotland, and at club level for Sheffield Eagles, Huddersfield Giants and the Warrington Wolves, as a prop.

== Playing career ==
Laughton played prop in Sheffield Eagles' 17–8 victory over Wigan in the 1998 Challenge Cup Final during Super League III at Wembley Stadium, London on Saturday 2 May 1998. That year he was named in the Super League Dream Team. Laughton was selected to travel with the Great Britain team down under for the 1999 Tri-Nations. He later played for the Scotland national team international and played at the 2000 World Cup.

Laughton retired from playing in January 2003, and re-joined Sheffield Eagles in a coaching role.
