= Matt Crowther =

Scotland international rugby league footballer

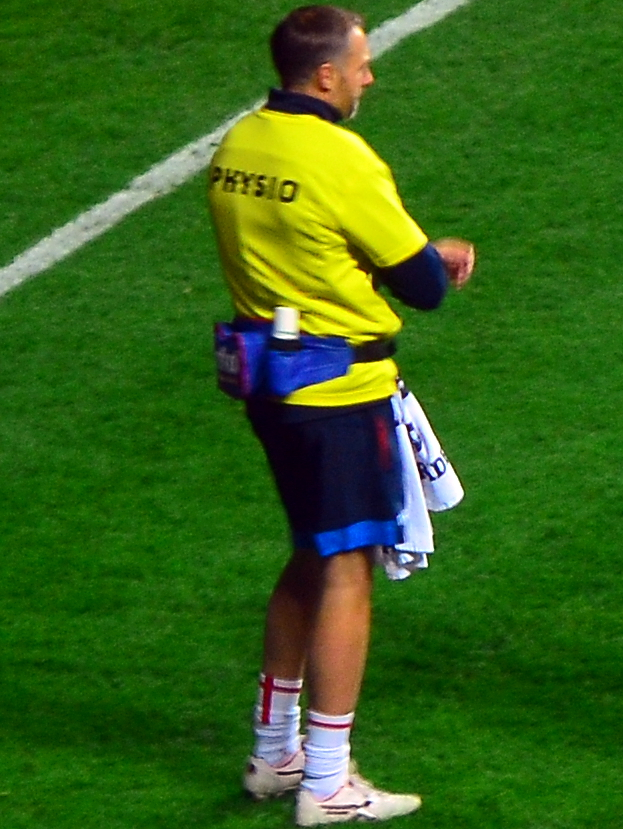

Personal information
- Full name: Matthew Lloyd Crowther
- Born: 6 May 1974 (age 51); Castleford, West Yorkshire, England

Playing information
- Position: Wing
Club
Years	Team	Pld	T	G	FG	P
1994–99	Sheffield Eagles	62	34	17	0	170
2000	Huddersfield-Sheffield Giants	15	5	24	0	68
2001–03	Hull FC	56	22	200	0	488
	Total	133	61	241	0	726
Representative
Years	Team	Pld	T	G	FG	P
1996–01	Scotland	8	3	19	0	50

Matt Crowther (born 6 May 1974) is a former professional rugby league footballer who played in the 1990s and 2000s for the Sheffield Eagles, Huddersfield-Sheffield Giants and Hull FC in the Super League. He is the Head Physio at Wakefield Trinity in the Super League.

== Playing career ==
=== Club career ===
Crowther started his professional career with the Sheffield Eagles. Matt Crowther played on the wing and scored a try in Sheffield Eagles' 17–8 victory over Wigan in the 1998 Challenge Cup Final during Super League III at Wembley Stadium, London on Saturday 2 May 1998. Following the club's merger with Huddersfield, he played for the Huddersfield-Sheffield Giants during Super League V before moving to Hull F.C. in September 2000. He remained at Hull until he was forced to retire in 2003 after breaking his leg in a match against the Castleford Tigers.

=== International career ===
Crowther was a Scotland international and played at the 2000 Rugby League World Cup.

== Post-playing career ==
After retiring as a player, Crowther became a physiotherapist. After working for the NHS for several years, he returned to rugby league as a physio for Featherstone Rovers. In 2014, he became a physio at Castleford Tigers.
