= Jeff Doyle (rugby league) =

Australian rugby league footballer

Personal information
- Born: 1 October 1967 (age 58)

Playing information
- Position: Centre
Club
Years	Team	Pld	T	G	FG	P
1988–91	Newcastle Knights	71	20	19	0	118
1992–93	North Sydney Bears	28	5	0	0	20
1993–94	Hull FC	30	9	0	0	36
1995–97	Western Reds	37	6	0	0	24
	Total	166	40	19	0	198
- Relatives: Rod Doyle (brother)

Jeff Doyle (born 1 October 1967) is a former professional rugby league footballer who played in the 1980s and 1990s. He played for the Newcastle Knights from 1988 to 1991, the North Sydney Bears from 1992 to 1993 and finally the Western Reds from 1995 to 1997.

Doyle spent a season in England playing for Hull.
