= Paul Broadbent =

English RL coach and former GB & England international rugby league footballer

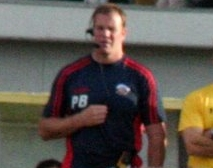

Personal information
- Full name: Paul Broadbent
- Born: 24 May 1968 (age 58) England

Playing information
- Position: Prop
Club
| Years | Team | Pld | T | G | FG | P |
|---|---|---|---|---|---|---|
| 1987–98 | Sheffield Eagles | 326 | 43 | 0 | 0 | 172 |
| 1999 | Halifax | 28 | 2 | 0 | 0 | 8 |
| 2000–01 | Hull FC | 56 | 3 | 0 | 0 | 12 |
| 2002 | Wakefield Trinity Wildcats | 24 | 0 | 0 | 0 | 0 |
| 2003 | York City Knights | 17 | 1 | 0 | 0 | 4 |
| | Total | 451 | 49 | 0 | 0 | 196 |
Representative
| Years | Team | Pld | T | G | FG | P |
| 1995–96 | England | 5 | 2 | 0 | 0 | 8 |
| 1996–97 | Great Britain | 8 | 0 | 0 | 0 | 0 |

Coaching information
Club
| Years | Team | Gms | W | D | L | W% |
| 2003 | York City Knights | 0 | 0 | 0 | 0 |
Representative
| Years | Team | Gms | W | D | L | W% |
| 2012–15 | Italy | 12 | 7 | 0 | 5 | 58 |
- Relatives: Blake Broadbent (son)

Paul Broadbent (born 24 May 1968), also known by the nickname "Beans", is an English former professional rugby league footballer who played in the 1990s and 2000s, and has coached in the 2000s, 2010s and 2020s. He played at representative level for Great Britain and England, and at club level for Sheffield Eagles, Halifax, Hull FC, Wakefield Trinity Wildcats (captain), and York City Knights, as a prop, and coached at club level for Wakefield Trinity Wildcats (First Team Coach).

== Biography ==
Broadbent's Testimonial match at Sheffield Eagles took place in 1997.

In the 1997 post season, Broadbent was selected to play for Great Britain at prop forward in all three matches of the Super League Test series against Australia.

Broadbent played at prop in Sheffield Eagles' 17-8 victory over Wigan Warriors in the 1998 Challenge Cup Final during Super League III at Wembley Stadium, London on Saturday 2 May 1998.

Broadbent won caps for England while at Sheffield Eagles in 1995 against France, in the 1995 Rugby League World Cup against Fiji, and South Africa (sub), in 1996 against France, and Wales. He also won caps for Great Britain while at Sheffield Eagles in 1996 against Papua New Guinea, Fiji, and New Zealand (3 matches).

He has previously coached Italy in their European Championship B matches 2012-15. Cameron Ciraldo will take over for the World Cup Qualifying matches.

Paul Broadbent is the father of the rugby league footballer for the Sheffield Eagles; Blake Broadbent.
