= Patrick Walker (executive) =

Patrick Walker is the CEO at Rightster, a London-based Multi Channel Network. Formally he worked at Base79 as Chief Content Officer after serving 8 years with Google and YouTube as the Senior Director of Content Partnerships, where he was responsible for launching and managing YouTube in Europe, the Middle East and Africa. Walker has also worked at RealNetworks, IMG, Intel, and the BBC as a foreign news journalist in Japan and Southeast Asia. He began his career in media and technology as a TV producer and director with NHK in Tokyo, Japan.
