= Ryan Sheridan (rugby league) =

Former GB & Ireland international rugby league footballer

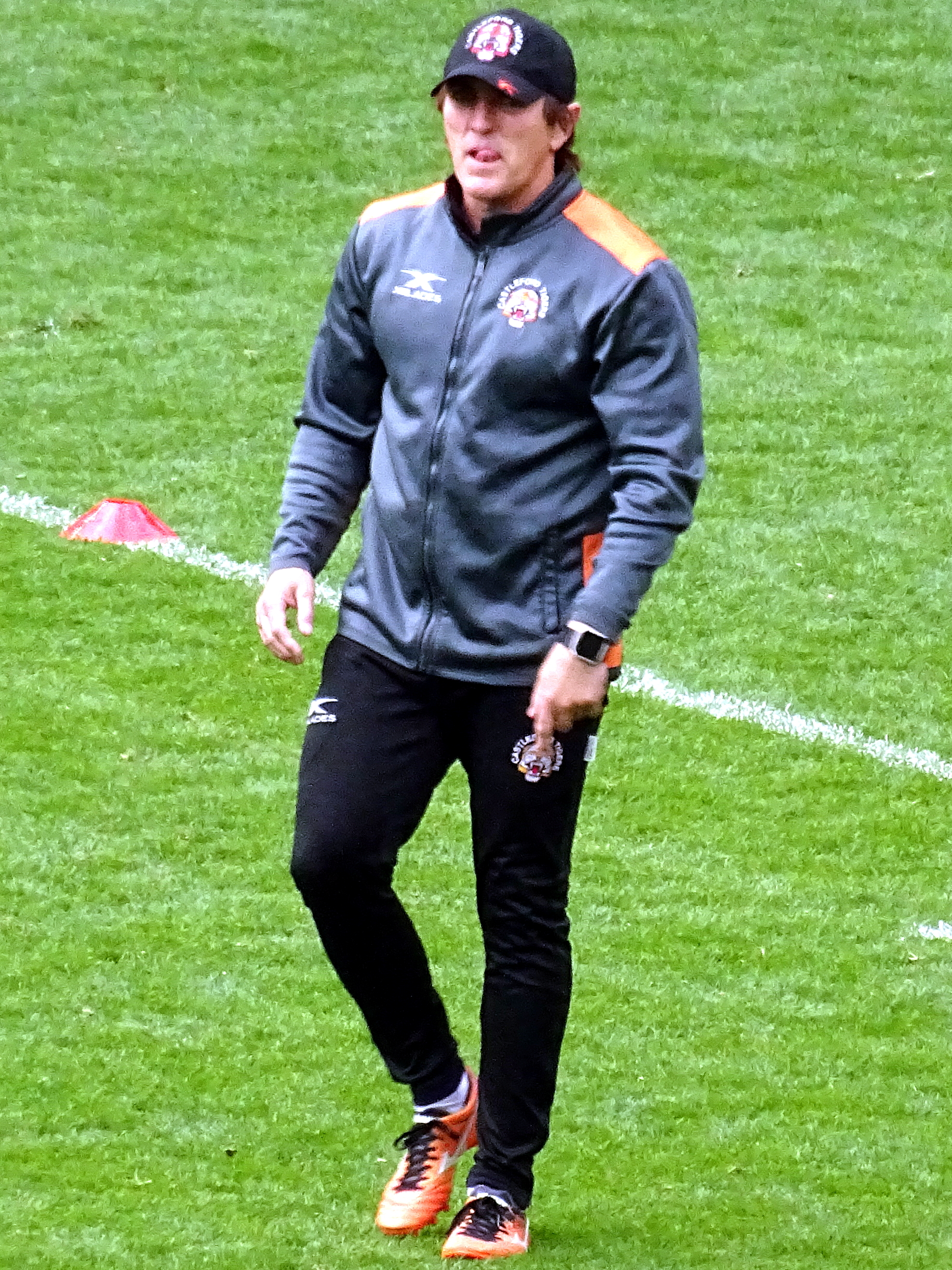

Personal information
- Full name: Ryan Patrick Sheridan
- Born: 24 May 1975 (age 51) Dewsbury, West Yorkshire, England

Playing information
- Position: Scrum-half
Club
Years	Team	Pld	T	G	FG	P
1992–96	Sheffield Eagles	97	40	0	1	141
1997–02	Leeds Rhinos	159	58	0	4	240
2003	Widnes Vikings	19	3	0	0	12
2004	Castleford Tigers	4	0	0	0	0
2005	Dewsbury Rams	27	7	0	0	28
	Total	306	108	0	5	421
Representative
Years	Team	Pld	T	G	FG	P
1999–02	Great Britain	3	0	0	0	0
2000	Ireland	4	2	0	0	8
2002	Yorkshire	2	0	0	0	0

Coaching information
Club
Years	Team	Gms	W	D	L	W%
2013	Featherstone Rovers	17	13	0	4	76
2026	Catalans Dragons	6	2	0	4	33
2027–	Sheffield Eagles	0	0	0	0
	Total	23	15	0	8	65
- Source: As of 3 November 2026

Ryan Patrick Sheridan (born 24 May 1975) is a professional rugby league coach who is the head coach of the Sheffield Eagles in the RFL Championship, and a former Ireland international rugby league footballer. Sheridan was an Ireland international and played at the 2000 Rugby League World Cup. Ryan Sheridan was one of the most influential players in the late 1990s for the Rhinos.

== Playing career ==
=== 1990s ===
Sheridan was born in Dewsbury, West Yorkshire, England, and he started his career with Dewsbury Moor ARLFC, and signed professionally with Sheffield Eagles in July 1991 making a total of 97 appearances, including 79 starts for the Sheffield Eagles in his six seasons at the club. He scored 40 tries and one drop goal.

Having joined the Leeds club in December 1996 from Sheffield Eagles, Sheridan was originally seen as a utility player and in his first season mixed between scrum half and hooker. However, with the arrival of Graham Murray in 1998, Sheridan came of age and was the perfect foil to the individual brilliance of Iestyn Harris with his organisational skills. He played for the Leeds Rhinos at scrum half in their 1998 Super League Grand Final defeat by the Wigan Warriors.

Sheridan saved his best performances for the Rhinos for the Challenge Cup, a competition he seemed to have a love affair with. In 1999 he was man of the match in all three crucial games on the way to the Final against Wigan, St Helens and then Bradford in the semi-final. His incredible pinching of the ball from Danny Peacock in the latter stages of the first half turned the game on its head and assured the Rhinos place at Wembley. Indeed, in the final but for Leroy Rivett's late burst of four tries, Sheridan would surely have won the Lance Todd Trophy. He was magnificent under the twin towers, twice denying London in the opening quarter as they threatened to cause a huge upset. His last-ditch tackle on Shaun Edwards, and then Karle Hammond steadied the ship before the second half onslaught began. Ryan rose to international status in 1999 when he earned a place in the Great Britain squad that played in the 1999 Tri-Nations series Down Under. He started the first game against Australia and was then on the bench against New Zealand.

=== 2000s ===
In the year 2000 Ryan teamed up with St Helens' Tommy Martyn for Ireland to form one of the most dangerous half back combinations in the 2000 Rugby League World Cup. Sheridan was outstanding for the Irish particularly in the crucial final group game against the New Zealand Māori rugby league team. Sheridan was also back to his best in the cup again claiming man of the match awards three more times, a run which continued right up until 2002 when he again scooped the award in the memorable win over Bradford Bulls at Valley Parade. Sheridan's time at Leeds was only interrupted by a serious muscle tear in 2001 which virtually ruled him out for the whole season. In total, Sheridan made 145 starts for Leeds plus 9 substitute appearances. He scored 59 tries and four drop goals to give him a total of 240 points in the Blue and Amber. He returned to representative rugby in 2002 when he captained Yorkshire in both Origin games and then represented Great Britain against Australia in Sydney in July of that year.

Ryan left the Rhinos in November 2002 and joined Super League rivals Widnes Vikings; the following year he joined Castleford Tigers.

== Coaching career ==
=== Featherstone Rovers ===
Ryan joined and coached alongside Daryl Powell at Featherstone Rovers. Sheridan followed Powell to Castleford in 2013, and again in 2022 when Powell became head coach at Warrington Wolves.

=== Catalans Dragons ===
On 29 March 2026 it was reported that he had taken the role of interim head-coach for Catalans Dragons in the Super League following the immediate and unexpected departure of Joel Tomkins

On 19 May 2026 he reverted back to the assistant coach role when John Cartwright was announced as the new head coach, albeit on a short-term deal for the remainder of the 2026 season.

=== Sheffield Eagles ===
On 18 October 2026 it was reported that he had taken on the role of head-coach of the Sheffield Eagles in the RFL Championship.
