= Paul Carr (rugby league) =

Scotland international rugby league footballer

Personal information
- Full name: Paul Carr
- Born: 13 May 1967 (age 58)

Playing information
- Position: Second-row, Lock
Club
Years	Team	Pld	T	G	FG	P
1991	South Sydney	1	0	0	0	0
1991–92	Hunslet	28	23	0	1	93
1992–98	Sheffield Eagles	170	75	0	0	300
	Total	199	98	0	1	393
Representative
Years	Team	Pld	T	G	FG	P
1997	Scotland	1	0	0	0	0

Paul Carr (born 13 May 1967) is a former professional rugby league footballer who played in the 1990s. He played at representative level for Scotland, and at club level for South Sydney Rabbitohs, Hunslet and Sheffield Eagles, as a second-row or lock forward.

== Playing career ==
=== Club career ===
Paul Carr played second-row in Sheffield Eagles' 17-8 victory over Wigan in the 1998 Challenge Cup Final during Super League III at Wembley Stadium, London on Saturday 2 May 1998.

Carr was inducted into Sheffield Eagles Hall of Fame in 2022.

=== International honours ===
Paul Carr won a cap for Scotland while at Sheffield Eagles in 1997 against France.
