= Lynton Stott =

English rugby league footballer

Personal information
- Full name: Lynton John Stott
- Born: 9 May 1971 (age 55) Newton-le-Willows, England

Playing information
- Position: Fullback, Wing, Centre
Club
Years	Team	Pld	T	G	FG	P
1993–98	Sheffield Eagles	103	40	11	1	183
1999	Wakefield Trinity Wildcats	23	5	6	1	33
2000–01	Doncaster	40	23	24	1	141
2001	Workington Town	17	7	0	2	30
2002–04	Hull Kingston Rovers	73	26	136	5	381
2005	Sheffield Eagles	14	0	1	0	2
	Total	270	101	178	10	770

Lynton John Stott (born 9 May 1971) is an English former professional rugby league footballer who played in the 1990s and 2000s. He played at club level for both the original, and the present incarnation of the Sheffield Eagles. He also played for the Wakefield Trinity Wildcats, Doncaster, Workington Town and Hull Kingston Rovers. He played as a fullback, Wing or centre.

== Background ==
Stott was born in Newton-le-Willows, St. Helens, Merseyside, England.

== Club career ==
Lynton Stott was an unused substitute in Sheffield Eagles' 17–8 victory over Wigan in the 1998 Challenge Cup Final at Wembley Stadium, London on Saturday 2 May 1998. He was released at the end of the season.

== Post-playing career ==
After retiring as a player, Stott worked for several years on the backroom staff at Bradford Bulls.
