= Mark Aston =

English RL coach & former GB international rugby league footballer

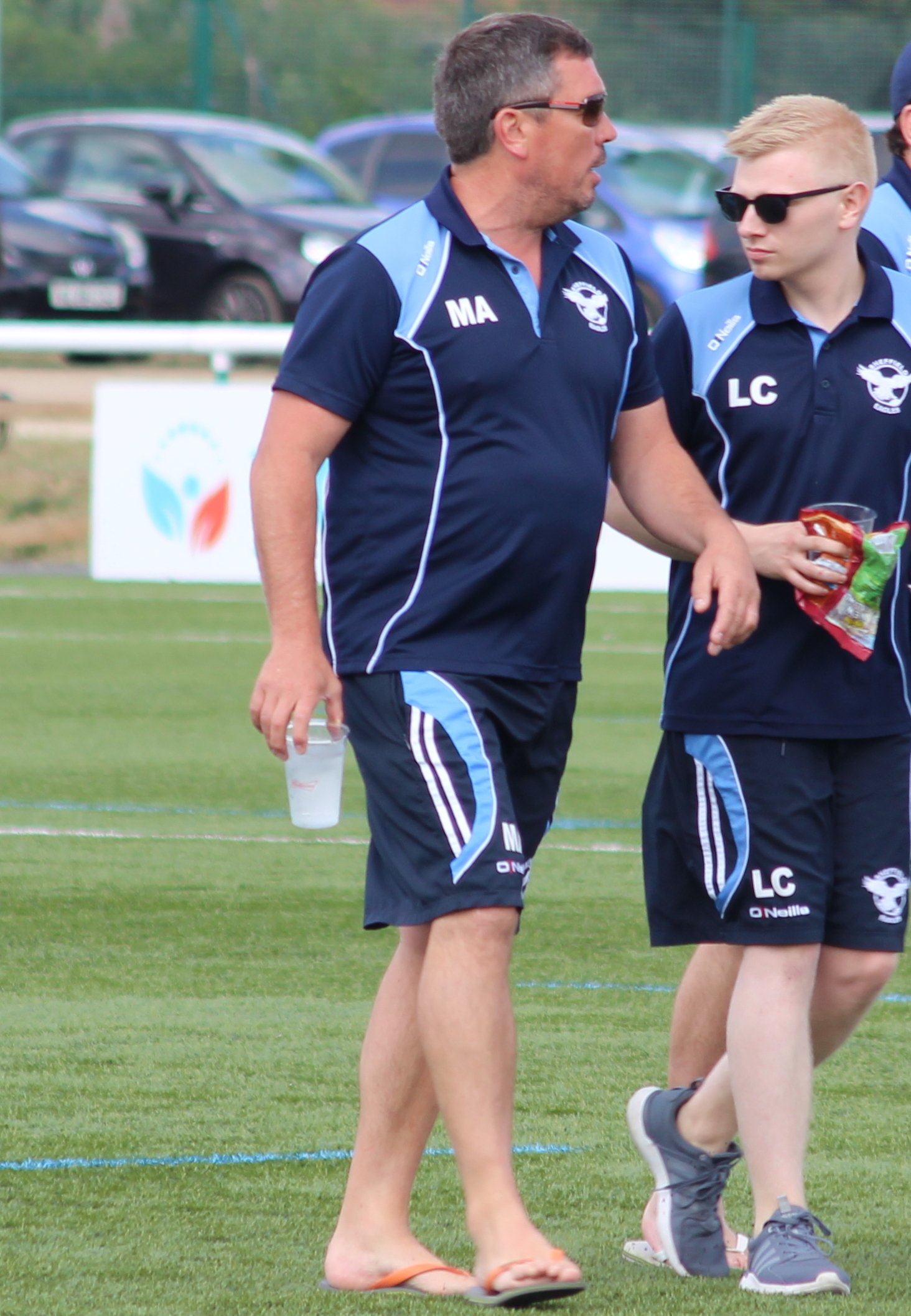

Personal information
- Full name: Mark Aston
- Born: 27 September 1967 (age 59) Castleford, West Riding of Yorkshire, England

Playing information
- Height: 5 ft 9 in (1.75 m)
- Position: Scrum-half
Club
Years	Team	Pld	T	G	FG	P
1986–94	Sheffield Eagles	232	40	588	34	1370
1987–88	→ Bramley (loan)	2	0	0	0	0
1994–95	Featherstone Rovers	35	6	85	2	196
1995–03	Sheffield Eagles	157	14	352	12	772
	Total	426	60	1025	48	2338
Representative
Years	Team	Pld	T	G	FG	P
1991	Great Britain	1	0	0	0	0
1992	GB tour games	4	0	0	0	0

Coaching information
Club
Years	Team	Gms	W	D	L	W%
1999–05	Sheffield Eagles
2007–24	Sheffield Eagles	430	231	9	190	54
	Total	430	231	9	190	54
Representative
Years	Team	Gms	W	D	L	W%
2011–17	Ireland	22	10	0	12	45
- Relatives: Cory Aston (son)

Mark Aston (born 27 September 1967) was the head coach of Sheffield Eagles in the Championship. He is an English rugby league coach, and former rugby league scrum-half who spent the majority of his playing career with Sheffield Eagles. He also had short spells with Featherstone Rovers and Bramley, and won one cap for Great Britain in 1991. In 1998, he was awarded the Lance Todd Trophy after helping Sheffield win the Challenge Cup final at Wembley Stadium with a 17–8 victory against Wigan Warriors.

Following the club's merger with Huddersfield Giants in 1999, he co-founded a new Sheffield Eagles club, and was named player-coach. He retired from playing in 2004, and briefly stepped down as head coach in 2005 before resuming coaching duties in 2007. In addition to coaching, he was held various positions in the Eagles boardroom, including CEO and Director of Rugby. From 2011 to 2017, he was also the head coach of the Ireland national team. In 2012, he was awarded an honorary doctorate by Sheffield Hallam University for his services to sport in Sheffield, and received the Rugby League Writers' Association Merit Award for services to rugby league.

He is the father of the rugby league stand-off or scrum-half; Cory Aston.

On 24 October 2024 Aston was suspended from all coaching activity until 30 April 2026 following an RFL Operational Rules Tribunal hearing. The tribunal ruled that Aston broke RFL rules by playing a player during a period when the player should have been rested for failing a head injury assessment. Sheffield Eagles had previously stood Aston down on a "no-fault" basis since the allegation arose in July 2024.

== Early years ==
Aston was born in Castleford, West Riding of Yorkshire, England.

He started playing rugby union at the age of eight in his home town of Castleford. He played one or two games but decided to switch to rugby league. He moved on to Stanley Rangers, in Wakefield, then after a couple of years until the age of fifteen at Oulton Raiders, where his father; Brian Aston had played as an amateur. He then moved to Lock Lane for one season, then started playing at Under-17 level for Castleford. Despite an offer of a professional contract with his home town club, he decided to accept an offer from Sheffield Eagles. At that point he had been playing open age rugby for Selby Gaffers, coached by his father Brian, and had made his first Eagles appearance as an unnamed trialist on Easter Day 1985.
