= Sheffield Eagles =

English professional rugby league club

Club information
- Full name: Sheffield Eagles Rugby League Football Club
- Nickname(s): The Eagles; The Red and Golds
- Colours: Red, white and gold
- Founded: 1984; 42 years ago
- Website: sheffieldeagles.com

Current details
- Ground: The MEPS International Home of Football Stadium, Dronfield, Derbyshire (2,089 (250 seats))
- Chairman: Chris Noble
- Coach: Ryan Sheridan
- Captain: Joel Farrell
- Competition: Championship
- 2026 season: 7th (Elimination Finals)
- Current season

Uniforms
Home colours	Away colours

Records
- Championship: 2 (2012, 2013)
- Challenge Cup: 1 (1998)
- 1895 Cup: 1 (2019)
- Most capped: 389 – Mark Aston
- Highest points scorer: 2142 – Mark Aston

The Sheffield Eagles are a professional rugby league club based in Dronfield, NE Derbyshire, England. They play home games at The MEPS International Home of Football Stadium in Dronfield, Derbyshire, and compete in the Championship, the second tier of British rugby league.

Sheffield's only major honour was winning the 1998 Challenge Cup, they have won the Second Division twice.

The clubs traditional home colours are red, white and gold and they share a rivalry with Doncaster.

== History ==
=== 1982–1984: Foundation of original Eagles ===
In 1982, Huddersfield captain and chairman of the Players' Union, Gary Hetherington, missed out on a coaching job at York F.C. He decided to form his own club in Sheffield. The original plan to enter the Second Division in 1983–84 fell apart when Sheffield United pulled back from their promise to let the new team play its home games at Bramall Lane.

The club eventually joined the Second Division in 1984, coached by Alan Rhodes, they played at the Owlerton Stadium. A competition was run in the Sheffield Star newspaper to find a name for the new club and "Sheffield Eagles" was the winner. The first Eagles league game was on 2 September 1984 when they beat Rochdale Hornets, 29–10. The match took place the day after the club's sponsor went bust. Hetherington was both manager and player in the first season, building the team using experienced players from traditional areas. He also began signing up promising young players, one of whom was Mark Aston, later to be a critical part of the Eagles' survival as a club and current head coach.

By November the club was close to folding because of financial problems. Sheffield beat Wakefield Trinity to set up a John Player Special Trophy first round tie against Leeds Rhinos. This lucrative game generated enough cash to see out the season.

=== 1985–1998: Progress and Challenge Cup win ===
On the field the club progressed steadily, improving their league position until in 1988/89 they finished third in the league table and made it to the Second Division Premiership final at Old Trafford. In the final they outplayed Swinton, beating them by 43–18 and gaining promotion to the top flight of rugby league. Sheffield's record attendance at Owlerton was set at 3,636 for a third-round Challenge Cup game against Oldham in 1989.

In the wake of the Hillsborough disaster, stadium safety became an issue in British sport and Owlerton was declared unfit to stage professional rugby league. Eagles were forced to play their home games at seven different venues including Hillsborough itself, Bramall Lane, Recreation Ground, Oakwell Stadium and Belle Vue. They survived one season in the top flight but were then relegated. This was a temporary decline as they immediately regained their place in the First Division, winning the Second Division title and Premiership. The Eagles slowly established themselves as a top flight club.

Don Valley Stadium became home for the club in September 1990, it had been built for the 1991 World Student Games held in Sheffield. In May 1991, Eagles signed their first local recruit, Jason Davidson. In 1992 they reached the Yorkshire Cup final, losing to Wakefield Trinity.

Bill Gardner became coach in July 1993 season replacing Gary Hetherington who stood down from his coaching role. In December following a run of five defeats, he was sacked and Hetherington took over as coach again.

Sheffield was included on the schedule for a game against the Kangaroos during their 1994 Kangaroo Tour and were defeated, 80–2, in the first game following the first test match at Wembley. This was the highest score by a Kangaroo touring team in England since they had defeated Bramley, 92–7, on the 1921–22 tour. The Kangaroos ran in 14 tries to nil at Don Valley Stadium. However, because of the tie the club benefited from a significant financial gain.

In March 1995, Sheffield pulled out of a proposed merger with Doncaster following a "breach of confidentiality"; Sheffield were then set to take-over 'The Dons' in a deal with administrators, which fell through after the RFL declared Doncaster players to be free agents.

When a Rupert Murdoch-funded Super League competition was first proposed, part of the deal was that some traditional clubs would merge. Sheffield were again down to merge with Doncaster to form a South Yorkshire club that would compete in Super League. This, along with other proposed mergers, were strongly opposed by supporters and never materialised. As Sheffield Eagles the club became a founder member of Super League in 1996 and took part in the first game of the Super League era against Paris Saint-Germain.

In November 1996, chief executive Gary Hetherington sold his controlling interest in Sheffield Eagles to take over Leeds. Phil Larder became head coach, Paul Thompson, Chairman of Sheffield-based Sanderson Group Plc, became the majority shareholder, and Eagles plc became the first rugby league club to be floated on the Stock Exchange.

John Kear took over the coaching reins at Sheffield Eagles in 1997, taking them to the Premiership Semi-final in that year. The club's record attendance was set in August 1997 when 10,603 spectators saw them play Bradford Bulls.

On 2 May 1998, having beaten Leigh Centurions, Egremont Rangers, Castleford Tigers and Salford Red Devils, the Eagles faced Wigan Warriors at Wembley Stadium in the final of the Rugby League Challenge Cup. Wigan were overwhelming favourites with a side containing some of the best players of the modern era, including Andy Farrell, Jason Robinson and Henry Paul. Sheffield coach John Kear devised a game plan that was executed perfectly by the team on the day. Star of the show was scrum half Mark Aston, who won the Lance Todd Trophy as man of the match. The Eagles led from start to finish, running out 17–8 winners in one of the biggest upsets in the history of the competition.

=== Huddersfield–Sheffield Giants ===
Just as the club seemed to be on the verge of its greatest period, following the win in the cup final, things began to go wrong. The expected increase in attendances did not happen and the team did not perform well, finishing close to the relegation zone only one year after the Wembley triumph. Finances plummeted and with little outside help it became apparent that the Eagles were not viable in their current state. Just a year after performing the greatest upset in Challenge Cup history, the Eagles announced that they were to fold at the end of the season should no investors come on board to save the club.

In late 1999 the Rugby Football League wanted to lower the number of clubs in Super League. One of the measures they put in place was the option for two clubs to merge for the sum of £1,000,000. Fearing this was the only way to keep rugby league alive in Sheffield, the club accepted an offer from the RFL to merge with another struggling team, the Huddersfield Giants, making a new team Huddersfield-Sheffield Giants, who were scheduled to play games in both Sheffield and Huddersfield in Super League V. The Huddersfield-Sheffield side's away strip was in the Sheffield Eagles colours. The merged Huddersfield-Sheffield team did not last the season before reverting to the Huddersfield name. An immediately resurrected Sheffield Eagles would continue in the lower leagues.

=== 2000–2005: 'New' Sheffield Eagles ===
The merger with Huddersfield was not accepted by Sheffield supporters, and so former player Mark Aston formed a new Eagles phoenix club, earning a place in the Northern Ford Premiership for the 2000 season, taking Bramley's vacated place.

From 1999 to the present the Eagles have played in the semi-professional leagues, first the Northern Ford Premiership and then the second division of the LHF Healthplan National League. Mark Aston assumed the role of player manager, continuing on the field until 2004, when he officially retired from playing. After the 2004 season Mark replaced his father Brian as chief executive, bringing in a new head coach in Gary Wilkinson at the end of the following year. As soon as the new club was reformed, it vowed to never overstretch its finances to achieve success. This made life difficult as the Eagles were denied the money received by other clubs in the NFP for TV rights as part of the deal that allowed them to re-enter the professional leagues.

2003 brought two club records; Sheffield suffered their record defeat on 2 February 2003 0–88 to Hull F.C. However, on 3 August 2003, London Skolars were the victims as Sheffield Eagles won 98–4, a record league victory to this day. In 2003 the team finished top of National League Two and reached the Grand Final, agonisingly losing 13–11 to the Keighley Cougars. Victory would have sent the Eagles into National League One, but this was not to be and a second play-off against the Batley Bulldogs ended in failure for the demoralised squad.

=== 2006–2008: Promotion ===
Until 2006 the team struggled to match this effort, with key players retiring or being signed by bigger clubs – young players Mitchell Stringer and Andy Raleigh went on to sign for Super League clubs. At the start of the 2006 season Gary Wilkinson was brought in as coach and the team finished in second place, qualifying for the play-offs for the right to join champions Dewsbury Rams in National League One. On 22 September 2006 they beat the Crusaders at the Don Valley Stadium to qualify for the Grand Final for a second time. In the Grand Final on 8 October they beat Swinton Lions 35–10 to be promoted to National League One. To the surprise of many Wilkinson resigned as head coach on 15 October 2006, citing personal reasons. National League One was seen as a springboard to a potential return to Super League, although this would be dependent on the RFL's continuation of the franchising or licensing system. As Sheffield Eagles' chairman Ian Swire, remarked, after the 2006 Grand Final victory, "We showed on Sunday that we can compete, and that in the near- to not-too-distant future we will get back into Super League".

Mark Aston returned as coach in 2007. The 2007 season started slowly for the promoted team but ended with the Eagles defying the bookmakers, who had them as favourites for relegation, by finishing 6th in the league table and qualifying for the play-offs, where they lost a close game to Halifax.

=== 2009–2012: Move to Bramall Lane ===
In 2009 National League 1 was renamed the Co-operative Championship. The 2009 season started unevenly with incoming International players delayed by visa problems. However, the Eagles rallied to progress to the 5th round of the Challenge Cup and produced consistent performances, gaining at least a losing bonus point from all their League games. Despite a number of long-term injuries, the team finished 3rd only narrowly missing out on 2nd place; their highest finish since the re-launch, and they again qualified for the play-offs. In the play-offs they were expected to easily beat Featherstone Rovers in the first match at Don Valley Stadium. However, Rovers surprised many by winning, ending Sheffield's season at the first play-off hurdle.

On 16 October 2009, the Eagles announced they would be moving their home games from the start of the 2010 season to Bramall Lane, home of Sheffield United in a bid to increase attendances and atmosphere at games which now take place on Sunday afternoons. The Eagles moved to Bramall Lane on 11 April 2010, losing by 40–16 to Featherstone Rovers. The attendance of 2,871 was 3 times the average the Eagles achieved at Don Valley Stadium and the club hope to push on from there to achieve a Super League licence. The 2010 season saw the club finish in 6th place, making the play-offs and surprising both Leigh Centurions and Barrow Raiders with away victories before falling to eventual champions Halifax.

The 2012 season was the Eagles most successful to date, reaching the semi-finals of the Northern Rail Cup for the first time and beating Featherstone Rovers 20–16 in the Grand Final to become Championship Champions. The final was a re-match of the 2011 fixture which was the Eagles 1st ever appearance at the final but were beaten soundly on that occasion 40–4. The Eagles defeated Batley, Halifax and Leigh to reach the Grand Final with Scott Turner, Misi Taulapapa, Quentin Laulu-Togagae and Dane McDonald all scoring for the Eagles to bring the trophy back to Sheffield.

The Eagles played 3 home games at Bramall Lane in 2012 with the rest taking place at Don Valley including a crowd on 1,895 watching the opening league game against Swinton Lions at Don Valley, the Eagles' highest crowd there since the Super League era.

=== 2013–2017: Post Don Valley ===
The 2013 season was equally if not more successful that the previous season, reaching the final of the Northern Rail Cup for the first time, losing to Leigh at the Shay, but more importantly becoming the first side to win back to back Championship Grand Finals by beating Batley 19–12 at Leigh Sports Village to retain the Championship title.

The Eagles moved back to Owlerton Stadium for the 2014 season as the Don Valley Stadium was scheduled for demolition. The Eagles planned to play at the new Sheffield Hallam University facility at Bawtry Road but unfortunately this was not possible and Owlerton Stadium stepped in at the last minute. Sheffield Eagles announced that they would leave Owlerton for the 2015 season due to new Rugby Football League ground regulations and played the season in nearby Doncaster at the Keepmoat Stadium, home of Doncaster.

In 2016 it was announced the Eagles would play at Sheffield Hallam University's Sports Park. The first league game played by the professional team there was against Halifax and they won 26–6.

In 2017, the club agreed a one-year ground share with Wakefield Trinity at Belle Vue. The club also returned to being a semi-professional outfit after an unsuccessful time as professional.

=== 2018–present: Permanent return to Sheffield ===
The Eagles made their long-awaited return to their home city at the Olympic Legacy Park in 2018. The new stadium has a 4G pitch and a capacity of 1,889, although this is expected to increase to meet Rugby Football League (RFL) regulations. The first home game back in Sheffield was against Toronto Wolfpack on 11 March, they lost 10–44. Ahead of this season players Greg Burns, Matt James and Ryan Millar agreed to sign on for a further two years. They struck a deal with Super League side St. Helens for players on Dual registration; this helped bolster the squad throughout the season and was considered to be a huge contribution to keeping them in the division. After a seven-game losing streak to open the season, the Eagles finally won, at home against Rochdale by 38 points to 20. The season, however, ended disappointingly as the Eagles finished eighth in the league with the greatest achievement being staying up.

In 2019, however, things were looking up for the side as they brought in 14 new signings, including ex-Eagles Jason Crookes, James Davey and Pat Walker, but lost key players in Joshua Toole (Forbes), Matty Fozard (London). They got off to a flying start as they overcame the challenges of Swinton, Barrow and Bradford in the first month of the new season. That year saw the Eagles return to Wembley for the first time in more than 2 decades to claim the inaugural 1895 Cup by defeating Widnes 38–16. However, their League season was less of a success as they finished in 7th place.

During the off-season, plans to build the Olympic Legacy Park were put into jeopardy as a court case to claim 100% ownership of Sheffield United F.C. found in favour of HRH Prince Abdullah bin Musa'ad bin Abdulaziz Al Saud over Kevin McCabe -one of the main investors to the OLP project for Sheffield. Because of this, there were fears that Mr McCabe would remove plans for his Scarborough Group LTD to head up construction of a new ground on the site at the OLP. However, these fears were quashed when it was revealed construction would go ahead as planned in early 2020.

Sheffield finished the 2021 Championship season in 12th place on the table. In the final game of the year, Sheffield were beaten 78–10 by Featherstone. The following season the club finished 7th on the table and missed out on the playoffs. In the 2023 RFL Championship, Sheffield finished fourth on the table and qualified for the finals, however they were eliminated in the first week of the finals by London losing 42–0. In 2024, Sheffield finished 7th on the table but missed out on the playoffs due to an inferior for and against.

== Stadiums ==
Sheffield originally played at Don Valley Stadium. In a bid to increase attendances, the Eagles left Don Valley in 2010 and moved to Bramall Lane where attendances rose to three times more than what they were at Don Valley. The Eagles returned to Don Valley midway through 2011 and stayed there until 2013. Don Valley was demolished in 2014.

After being left homeless the club moved to the city's greyhound track, Owlerton Stadium in Hillsborough where they had previously played games between 1984 and 1989. The club experienced a dip in form at Owlerton, with there being temporary changing rooms and poor facilities.

The club moved out of Sheffield for the first time in 2015 when they made the temporary switch to the Keepmoat Stadium, Doncaster. Here they ground shared with Doncaster Rovers and local rivals Doncaster, who were playing in the same division which meant the two clubs playing an extra home game when they faced each other. At the end of the season, during The Qualifiers, the Eagles' were allowed to return to Bramall Lane for games against Hull K.R. and Wakefield Trinity. They also hosted Hull F.C. at the Lane, in a Challenge Cup fifth round tie.

The Eagles moved to Sheffield Hallam University's Sports Park on Bawtry Road, Brinsworth, Rotherham in 2016, where the reserves played their home fixtures. Temporary seating was erected to bring the capacity to 3,000 to meet Rugby Football League (RFL) regulations.

After finding themselves homeless again with work on the Sheffield Olympic Legacy Stadium delayed and unable to find a home in Sheffield, the Eagles played their home matches at Belle Vue, the home of Wakefield Trinity, for the duration of the 2017 season.

The club finally permanently returned to Sheffield and the Olympic Legacy Park in 2018. Work started on the construction of a £5million stadium in the spring of 2019. In April 2026 the Eagles announced that they would move to the MEPS International Home of Football Stadium, to groundshare with Sheffield F.C..

- Don Valley Stadium (1999–2009)
- Bramall Lane (2010–2011)
- Don Valley Stadium (2011–2013)
- Owlerton Stadium (2014)
- Keepmoat Stadium (2015), (2021)
- Sheffield Hallam University Sports Park (2016)
- Belle Vue (2017)
- Sheffield Olympic Legacy Stadium (2018–2026)
- The MEPS International Home of Football Stadium (2026-present)

== Colours and badge ==
=== Colours ===
The club adopted the colours of the original Sheffield Eagles, playing in red, gold and white. The club's shirts have been predominantly red with either a gold or white V across the front. Away shirts vary in colour with some being black or white. The 2020 home shirt is predominantly red, white and gold. The 2020 away kit is a gold and black strip, black shorts and black socks.

=== Badge ===
The original club's badge was an Eagles head inside a crest with The Eagles across the top and Sheffield Eagles in italics across the bottom. The inside of the crest was yellow with a red border. The new club chose to use a different more updated crest to replace the old dated one. The new more modern crest features an eagle with Sheffield Eagles written below it.

== Kit sponsors and manufacturers ==
Year	Kit Manufacturer	Main Shirt Sponsor
1982–1985	O'Neills	Trophy
1993–1995	Matchmakers	Trophy
2007–2008	Kukri	Roof Shop
2009–2010	Kukri	Dave Lamb
2011–2014	Macron	GRI Group
2015	Macron	Black Eye Project
2016	BLK	DBL Logistics
2017	O'Neills	OSI Office & School Furniture
2018	O'Neills	SteelPhalt
2019	O'Neills	GRI Group
2020	Oxen	GRI Group
2021	Oxen	GRI Group
2022	Oxen	GRI Group
2023	O'Neills	Evogo
2024	O'Neills	Evogo
2025	Samurai	Evogo

== 2027 squad ==
Sheffield Eagles 2027 squad
First team squad			Coaching staff
(England) Jordan Abdull – SO, SH; (England) Harry Bowes – HK, LF; (England) Blake Broadbent – LF, PR; (England) Joe Brown – WG, FB; (England) Jamie Cooke – CE, SR; (England) Greg Eden – WG, FB; (Jamaica) Joel Farrell – SR	(England) Connor Fitzsimmons – LF, SR; (England) Alex Foster – SR, CE, LF; (England) Kieran Gill – CE, WG; (England) George Griffin – PR, SR; (England) Josh Hodson – CE, SR; (England) Corey Johnson – HK; (England) Jordan Lilley – SO, SH; (England) Matty Marsh – FB, SH, SO	(Zimbabwe) Masi Matongo – PR; (England) Adam Milner – HK, LF; (England) Kai Morgan – SH, HK, SO; (Scotland) Will Oakes – WG, CE; (England) Lewis Peachey – SR, PR, LF; (Ireland) Martyn Reilly – PR, LF; (Wales) Billy Walkley – WG, FB	Head coach: (Ireland) Ryan Sheridan; Assistant coaches: (England) Ian Hardman; (England) Adam Milner (Player-coach); Legend: (c) Captain(s); (vc) Vice-captain(s); Updated: Source(s): https://www.sheffieldeagles.com/teams/men/

== 2027 transfers ==
=== Gains ===
Player	From	Contract	Date
(England) Adam Milner	Oldham RLFC	1 year	6 November 2026

=== Losses ===
Player	To	Contract	Date
(England) Reiss Butterworth	Oldham RLFC	2 years	17 September 2026
(England) Marcus Green	Keighley Cougars	1 year	7 October 2026
(England) Jayden Billy	Keighley Cougars	1 year	9 October 2026
(England) Lennie Ellis			23 October 2026
(England) Jack Bussey			29 October 2026
(England) Ryan Millar	Rochdale Hornets	1 year	30 October 2026
(England) Connor Bower	Birmingham Hurricanes	2 years	3 November 2026

== Players ==
=== Players earning international caps while at Sheffield Eagles ===
- Mark Aston won caps for Great Britain while at Sheffield 1991 France
- Frédéric Banquet won caps for France while at Sheffield 1995 ?-caps
- Paul Broadbent won caps for England while at Sheffield 1995 France, Fiji, South Africa (sub), 1996 France, Wales, and won caps for Great Britain while at Sheffield 1996 Papua New Guinea, Fiji, New Zealand (3 matches), 1997 ASL (3 matches)
- Anthony Farrell won caps for England while at Sheffield 1995 Wales, while at Leeds 1999 France (2 matches)
- Matty Fozard won caps for Wales at 2017 World Cup Papua New Guinea (sub), Fiji (sub) and Ireland
- Andrew Henderson won caps for Scotland including 2 at 2013 World Cup New Zealand (sub) and USA
- Will Hope won caps for Ireland at 2017 World Cup Wales (2 tries)
- Lee Jackson won caps for England 1995 France, Australia (2 matches), Fiji, Wales, and won caps for Great Britain 1993 New Zealand (2 matches), 1994 France, Australia (3 matches)
- John "Johnny" Lawless won caps for England while at Sheffield 1996 France, Wales
- Garry Lo won caps for Papua New Guinea at 2017 World Cup Wales, Ireland (1 try), United States and England (1 try)
- Rémy Marginet won caps for France at 2017 World Cup Australia (1 goal), England (sub)
- Steve Molloy won caps for England while at Leeds 1992 Wales, while at Featherstone Rovers 1996 France (sub), Wales, while at Sheffield 1999 France (2 matches), and won caps for Great Britain while at Leeds 1993 France, while at Featherstone Rovers 1994 Fiji, 1996 Fiji (sub), New Zealand (sub)
- Daryl Powell won caps for England while at Sheffield 1992 Wales (sub), 1995 Wales, France, while at Keighley Australia, South Africa, 1996 Wales, and won caps for Great Britain while at Sheffield 1990 France (sub), Papua New Guinea (2 matches), New Zealand (sub), New Zealand (2 matches), Australia (3 matches), 1991 France (2 matches), Papua New Guinea, 1992 France (sub), France, Papua New Guinea, Australia (3 matches), New Zealand (2 matches), 1993 France (sub), New Zealand (sub) (3 matches), 1994 France (sub), Australia (2 matches), Australia (sub), while at Keighley 1996 Papua New Guinea (sub), Fiji, New Zealand (3 matches)
- Keith Senior won caps for England while at Leeds 2000 Australia, Russia, Ireland, New Zealand, 2001 Wales, and won caps for Great Britain while at Sheffield 1996 Fiji, New Zealand, 1998 New Zealand (3 matches), while at Leeds 1999 Australia, New Zealand, 2001 Australia (3 matches), 2002 Australia, New Zealand (3 matches), 2003 Australia (2 matches), 2004 Australia (3 matches), New Zealand (2 matches), 2005 Australia (2 matches), New Zealand (2 matches), 2006 New Zealand (3 matches), Australia (2 matches), 2007 New Zealand (3 matches)
- Menzie Yere won caps for Papua New Guinea while at Sheffield. 2009 Pacific Cup: Tonga (2 tries), Cook Islands (2 Tries). 2010 Four Nations: Australia, New Zealand (1 try), England (1 try).

=== Other notable players ===
These players are either "Hall of Fame" inductees, or were international representatives before, or after, their time at Sheffield Eagles.

- Gavin "Gav" Brown
- Paul Carr
- Mick Cook
- Ged Corcoran
- Matt Crowther
- Josaia Dakuitoga
- Carl De Chenu
- Paul Dixon
- Rod Doyle
- Richard Eyres
- Mark Gamson
- Jean-Marc Garcia
- Damian Gibson
- Aaron Groom
- Corey Hanson
- Jeff Hardy
- Andy Hay
- Gary Hetherington
- Jack Howieson
- Michael Jackson
- Aled James
- Jordan James
- Jamie Langley
- Dale Laughton
- Brendon Lindsay
- William "Willie" Morganson
- Chris Morley
- Martin Pearson
- Nick Pinkney
- Darren Shaw
- Ryan Sheridan
- Waisale Sovatabua
- Gareth Stephens
- Lynton Stott
- Whetu Taewa
- Frederic Teixido
- Chris Thorman
- Darren Turner
- Etu Uaisele
- Dave Watson
- Oliver Wilkes
- Martin Wood
- Malakai Yasa

=== Reserves ===
Sheffield Hallam Eagles were formed in 2013 to compete in the new Conference League South. They are a joint venture between the Eagles and Sheffield Hallam University to help young local rugby players progress and serve as a reserve team for the Eagles. They have played matches at the Don Valley Stadium before it was demolished, but their regular home is at Sheffield Hallam University Sports Park. In 2013 under coach Andrew Henderson they lifted the title, beating Nottingham Outlaws, having lost just once all season. In 2014 they also lost just one game, the Grand Final against Valley Cougars. Between these two defeats they registered 32 straight wins. In 2015, they finished 5th. The Hallam Eagles also finished 5th in 2016 with 17 points from 16 games.

== Staff ==
=== Sheffield Eagles Staff ===
Position	Staff
Head Coach	Ryan Sheridan
Assistant Coach	(England) Craig Huby
Assistant Coach	(England) Paul Broadbent
Assistant Coach	(England) Mick Piper
Strength & Conditioning Coach	(England) Jon Kelly
Therapist	(England) David Allpress
Therapist	(England) Sam Powell
Operations Director	(England) Mark Hannigan
Equipment & Apparel Manager	(England) Brian Moore

=== List of head coaches ===
Name	Years	Honours
Gary Hetherington	1984–1993	
Gary Hetherington	1993–1996	
Phil Larder	1997	
John Kear	1997–1999	Challenge Cup 1998
Mark Aston	1999–2005	
Gary Wilkinson	2006	National League 2 Playoffs 2006
Mark Aston	2007–2024	Championship 2012, 2013 | 1895 Cup 2019
Craig Lingard	2025– 2026	

== Seasons ==
=== League history ===
- 1984–1989: Division 2
- 1989–1996: Division 1
- 1996–1999: Super League
- 2000–2002: Championship
- 2003–2005: League 1
- 2006–Present: Championship

=== Super League era ===
Season	League									Play-offs	Challenge Cup	Other competitions		Name	Tries	Name	Points
Season	Division	P	W	D	L	F	A	Pts	Pos	Play-offs	Challenge Cup	Other competitions		Top try scorer		Top point scorer	
1996	Super League	22	10	0	12	599	730	20	7th		R5						
1997	Super League	22	9	0	13	415	574	18	8th		R5						
1998	Super League	23	8	2	13	495	541	18	8th		W						
1999	Super League	30	10	1	19	518	818	21	10th		R4						
2000	Northern Ford Premiership	28	9	1	18	479	585	19	14th		R3						
2001	Northern Ford Premiership	28	14	0	14	637	543	28	11th		R4						
2002	Northern Ford Premiership	27	13	0	14	597	648	26	12th		R4						
2003	National League Two	18	13	0	5	644	326	26	1st	Lost in final	R5						
2004	National League Two	18	12	0	6	569	340	24	3rd		R4						
2005	National League Two	18	8	0	10	414	529	16	7th		R4						
2006	National League Two	22	18	0	4	808	390	36	2nd	Won in final	R3						
2007	National League One	18	6	1	11	414	527	24	6th	Lost in elimination playoffs	R5						
2008	National League One	18	8	1	9	425	530	29	7th		R3						
2009	Championship	20	11	0	9	635	447	42	3rd	Lost in elimination playoffs	R5						
2010	Championship	20	10	1	9	503	555	35	6th	Lost in preliminary final	R4						
2011	Championship	20	12	0	8	577	488	39	4th	Lost in final	R4						
2012	Championship	18	12	1	5	565	437	41	4th	Won in final	R5						
2013	Championship	26	22	0	4	806	474	67	2nd	Won in final	QF	Championship Cup	RU				
2014	Championship	26	16	0	10	790	605	54	5th		R5						
2015	Championship	23	17	0	6	586	451	34	3rd		R5						
2015	The Qualifiers	7	2	0	5	152	267	4	7th		R5						
2016	Championship	23	8	0	15	583	617	16	7th	Lost in Shield Final	R5						
2016	Championship Shield	30	12	0	18	855	763	24	3rd	Lost in Shield Final	R5						
2017	Championship	23	10	0	13	568	785	20	7th	Lost in Shield Final	R4						
2017	Championship Shield	30	13	0	17	762	986	26	3rd	Lost in Shield Final	R4						
2018	Championship	23	7	0	16	437	843	14	8th		R4						
2018	Championship Shield	30	8	0	22	549	1091	16	6th		R4						
2019	Championship	27	15	0	12	748	694	30	7th		R4	1895 Cup	W				
2020 (Note: The 2020 Championship was abandoned due to the COVID-19 pandemic in the United Kingdom. Statistics shown are those at time of abandonment and are not official.)	Championship	5	1	0	4	60	148	2	11th		R6						
2021	Championship	20	5	3	12	420	665	13	12th		R3 (Note: Officially round 1 due to the competitions temporary restructure in 2021.)	1895 Cup	R1				
2022	Championship	27	12	0	15	701	660	24	7th		R6	1895 Cup	SF				
2023	Championship	27	16	0	11	780	560	32	4th	Lost in Elimination Playoffs	R4						
2024	Championship	27	16	0	11	780	560	32	7th		R6	1895 Cup	RU				
2025	Championship	24	6	0	18	381	689	12	11th		R3	1895 Cup	QF				
2026	Championship	24	16	0	8	637	545	32	7th		R3	1895 Cup	R1				

== Honours ==
=== League ===
- Second Division / Championship:

Winners (2): 2012, 2013
Runners up (1): 2011

- Third Division / League 1:

Playoff Final: 2006

=== Cup ===
- Challenge Cup:

Winners (1): 1998
Runners up (0):

- 1895 Cup:

Winners (1): 2019
Runners up (1): 2024

- Championship Cup:

Runners up (1): 2013

- Tolent Cup:

Winners (5): 2000, 2001, 2003, 2004, 2005
Runners up (0):

- South Yorkshire Cup:

Winners (8): 2001, 2002, 2007, 2008, 2010, 2012, 2013, 2014

== Records ==
=== Player records ===
- Most tries in a game: 5 by Menzie Yere vs Leigh East 7 April 2013, Quentin Laulu-Togaga'e vs Rochdale Hornets 7 September 2014 & Daryl Powell (vs Mansfield Marksman) 2 January 1989
- Most goals in a game: 14 by Dominic Brambani vs Leigh East 7 April 2013
- Most points in a game: 32 by Roy Rafferty (vs Fulham) 21 September 1986
- Most tries in a season: 46 by Menzie Yere, 2013
- Most goals in a season: 169 by Dominic Brambani, 2013
- Most points in a season: 361 by Dominic Brambani, 2013
- Most career tries: 195 by Menzie Yere, 2009–19

=== Team records ===
- Highest score for: 112–6 vs Leigh East 7 April 2013
- Highest score against: 0–88 vs Hull FC, 2 February 2003
- Highest attendance: 10,603 vs Bradford Bulls, 16 August 1997

== Women's team ==
In November 2021, Sheffield Eagles announced plans to establish a women's team in January 2022. The team competed in League 1 winning the Grand Final 26–6 over Illingworth and earning promotion to the Championship for 2023. In December 2023, it was revealed that Sheffield would make their Challenge Cup debut in 2024. In January 2024, following the restructuring of the women's league pyramid, it was announced that Sheffield would be in the 2024 Northern Women's Championship. They finished second in the league and lost to the league leaders, Leigh Leopards, in the Grand Final.

== See also ==
- Rugby Football League expansion
- Sheffield Eagles Wheelchair: wheelchair rugby league team
