= 1998 Super League season =

Season in rugby league

Super League III
- League: Super League
- Duration: 23 Rounds
- Teams: 12
- Highest attendance: 19,188; Bradford Bulls vs Leeds Rhinos (12 April)
- Lowest attendance: 2,014; London Broncos vs Huddersfield Giants (23 Aug)
- Broadcast partners: Sky Sports

1998 Season
- Champions: Wigan Warriors; 1st Super League title 18th British title
- League Leaders: Wigan Warriors
- Man of Steel: (Wales) Iestyn Harris
- Top point-scorer: (Wales) Iestyn Harris (255)
- Top try-scorer: (England) Anthony Sullivan (20)

New franchise
- Awarded to: Gateshead Thunder

Promotion and relegation
- Promoted from Division One: Hull Sharks; Huddersfield Giants

JJB Sports Super League III was the official name for the year 1998's Super League championship season, the 104th season of top-level professional rugby league football in Britain, and the third season played in summer.

The League format changed in 1998, with a playoff series being used to determine the Super League Champions for the first time since the 1972–73 season.

The team which finished on the top of the table were, from this season, awarded the League Leaders' Shield, with the inaugural honours going to Wigan. Huddersfield Giants, the league's bottom club was saved from relegation in 1998 due to the expansion of the league to fourteen teams in Super League IV. The season culminated in the grand final between Leeds Rhinos and Wigan Warriors, which Wigan won, claiming the 1998 Championship.

== Notable events ==
=== League affairs and broadcasting ===
The 1998 pre-season marked the departure of Rugby Football League chief executive Maurice Lindsay, who was asked to resign by RFL president Rodney Walker in early January. He was succeeded by his right-hand man, former deputy chief executive Neil Tunnicliffe. However, Lindsay immediately signed up for the position of managing director at Super League (Europe), the parent company of Super League. The deal brokered between the RFL and SLE for his transfer entailed the payment of Lindsay's salary by the RFL for two years, as well as the payment to SLE of about £500,000 previously earmarked for the defunct Paris Saint-Germain and Oldham clubs.

Lindsay's move which quickly followed by another row over which organization would represent Super League clubs in their negotiations with Sky for the sport's next television contract. The deal was eventually signed between Sky and Super League Europe, although it still required the approval of FASDA (the group representing the RFL's minor league clubs), who was offered the sum of £10.8 million by Sky in exchange for their approval. However, FASDA stalled deal in order to obtain assurances from SLE that the promotion system would be preserved, even as talks were underway with expansion teams in Gateshead and South Wales. Two weeks later, FASDA and SLE reached an agreement keeping promotion and relegation.

This paved the way for the signing of the new TV deal on 15 July. The total amount was £44 million over four years, plus a £1 million signing bonus for the Super League itself, and another £1 million to the RFL for the rights to select international matches not covered by main broadcasting contracts. With the new agreement secured, Rodney Walker, who had previously hinted at his resignation from the RFL due to recurring tensions within the organization and possible scheduling conflicts with his new job as chairman of the UK Sports Council, announced that he would likely reconsider, which he did. Meanwhile, towards the end of 1998, reports that Lindsay had started investing in betting booths at several racetracks all but confirmed the rumor that he was intent on leaving the sport of rugby league at the end of his two-year deal with SLE.

=== Other ===
Despite FASDA rejecting a proposal to officially recognize farm team agreements at the end of the previous season, player call-ups continued unabated amidst several Super League clubs' decision to shut down their reserve teams. As a result, FASDA demanded in January that the number of players concerned by such arrangements be capped to three. In July, a committee headed by technical director Joe Lydon proposed to abolish transfer fees for players above the age of twenty-four.

== Teams ==
Legend
| Reigning Champions |
| Challenge Cup Holders |
| Promoted |

| Team | Stadium | Capacity | City/Area |
|---|---|---|---|
| Bradford Bulls | Odsal | 27,000 | Bradford, West Yorkshire |
| Castleford Tigers | Wheldon Road | 11,750 | Castleford, West Yorkshire |
| Halifax Blue Sox | Thrum Hall | 9,832 | Halifax, West Yorkshire |
| Huddersfield Giants | Galpharm Stadium | 24,500 | Huddersfield, West Yorkshire |
| Hull Sharks | The Boulevard | 10,500 | Hull, East Riding of Yorkshire |
| Leeds Rhinos | Headingley | 21,500 | Leeds, West Yorkshire |
| London Broncos | The Valley | 27,000 | Charlton, Greater London |
| Salford Reds | The Willows | 11,363 | Salford, Greater Manchester |
| Sheffield Eagles | Don Valley Stadium | 25,000 | Sheffield, South Yorkshire |
| St Helens | Knowsley Road | 17,500 | St Helens, Mersyside |
| Warrington Wolves | Wilderspool | 9,200 | Warrington, Cheshire |
| Wigan Warriors | Central Park | 18,000 | Wigan, Greater Manchester |

== Table ==
| Pos | Team | Pld | W | D | L | PF | PA | PD | Pts | Qualification |
|---|---|---|---|---|---|---|---|---|---|---|
| 1 | Wigan Warriors (L, C) | 23 | 21 | 0 | 2 | 762 | 222 | +540 | 42 | Semi Final |
| 2 | Leeds Rhinos | 23 | 19 | 0 | 4 | 662 | 369 | +293 | 38 | Qualifying Semi Final |
| 3 | Halifax Blue Sox | 23 | 18 | 0 | 5 | 658 | 390 | +268 | 36 | Qualifying Semi Final |
| 4 | St Helens | 23 | 14 | 1 | 8 | 673 | 459 | +214 | 29 | Elimination Semi Final |
| 5 | Bradford Bulls | 23 | 12 | 0 | 11 | 498 | 450 | +48 | 24 | Elimination Semi Final |
| 6 | Castleford Tigers | 23 | 10 | 1 | 12 | 446 | 522 | −76 | 21 | |
| 7 | London Broncos | 23 | 10 | 0 | 13 | 415 | 476 | −61 | 20 | |
| 8 | Sheffield Eagles | 23 | 8 | 2 | 13 | 495 | 541 | −46 | 18 | |
| 9 | Hull Sharks | 23 | 8 | 0 | 15 | 431 | 574 | −143 | 16 | |
| 10 | Warrington Wolves | 23 | 7 | 1 | 15 | 411 | 645 | −234 | 15 | |
| 11 | Salford Reds | 23 | 6 | 1 | 16 | 319 | 575 | −256 | 13 | |
| 12 | Huddersfield Giants | 23 | 2 | 0 | 21 | 288 | 825 | −537 | 4 | |

Rules for classification: 1) Points; 2) Points difference; 3) Number of points scored;
(C) Champions; (L) League Leaders

== Play-offs ==
The top five clubs at the end of the 23-round regular season entered the play-offs to decide the championship.

The format was to have an elimination play off between the fourth and fifth teams (the fourth team gaining home advantage) and then have a qualifying play-off between the second and third placed teams (the second placed team gaining home advantage). The winner of the qualifier would play the team finishing first in the first semi final whilst the losing team got a second chance and played against the winner of the eliminating play off between fourth and fifth. The winner of the qualifying semi final would progress to the final of the Super League championship and the losing side would get another chance and play against the winning side of the elimination semi final.

Qualifying play-off 4 October 1998
2 | Leeds Rhinos | 13
3 | Halifax Blue Sox | 6
4 | St. Helens | 46
5 | Bradford Bulls | 24

Qualifying semi-final 11 October 1998
1 | Wigan Warriors | 17
Leeds Rhinos | 4
Elimination semi-final 9 October 1998
Halifax Blue Sox | 30
St. Helens | 37

Preliminary final
Leeds Rhinos | 44
St. Helens | 16

Grand Final; 24 October 1998
Wigan Warriors | 10
Leeds Rhinos | 4

=== Grand final ===
24 October 1998

| Wigan Warriors | 10–4 | Leeds Rhinos |
|---|---|---|
| Tries: Robinson; Goals: Farrell (3) | Report | Tries: Blackmore |

Old Trafford, Manchester
Attendance: 43,533
Referee: Russell Smith (Castleford)

== See also ==
- 1998 Super League Grand Final
