= 2004 Rugby League Tri-Nations =

2004 Tri-Nations
- Number of teams: 3
- Host country: United Kingdom
- Winner: Australia (2nd title)
- Matches played: 7
- Attendance: 182,288 (26,041 per match)
- Tries scored: 47 (6.71 per match)
- Top scorer: (Australia) Darren Lockyer (28)
- Top try scorer: (Australia) Luke Rooney (6)

The second Rugby League Tri-Nations tournament (known as the Gillette Tri-Nations for sponsorship reasons) was contested between 16 October and 27 November of 2004. The format of the competition differed from the previous event in that the teams played each other twice, rather than once, prior to the final.

The tournament final of the tournament was predicted by some to be a close affair, with the British team heralded as slight favourites after finishing at the top of the league table. Instead, it was a one-sided match as Australia produced their best performance of the tournament. The game was effectively over by half-time when Australia led by 38–0.

== Participating teams ==
Each team was to play the other three twice during the round robin tournament. The top two finishing teams would then contest the final.

Team	Nickname	Coach	Captain	RLIF Rank
Australia	The Kangaroos	Wayne Bennett	Darren Lockyer	1
New Zealand	The Kiwis	Daniel Anderson	Ruben Wiki	2
(United Kingdom) Great Britain	The Lions	Brian Noble	Andy Farrell	3

== Officials ==
One referee from each participating nation was appointed to control matches in the Tri-Nations:

- (Australia) Tim Mander (2 matches)
- (England) Russell Smith (3 matches)
- (New Zealand) Glen Black (2 matches)

== Venues ==
The games were played at the following venues in New Zealand and England.

Auckland	London	Manchester
North Harbour Stadium	Loftus Road	City of Manchester Stadium
Capacity: 25,000	Capacity: 18,439	Capacity: 47,726
Huddersfield	Wigan	Hull
Galpharm Stadium	JJB Stadium	KC Stadium
Capacity: 24,500	Capacity: 25,138	Capacity: 25,400

=== Final ===
The tournament final was played in Leeds.

Leeds
Elland Road
Capacity: 37,890
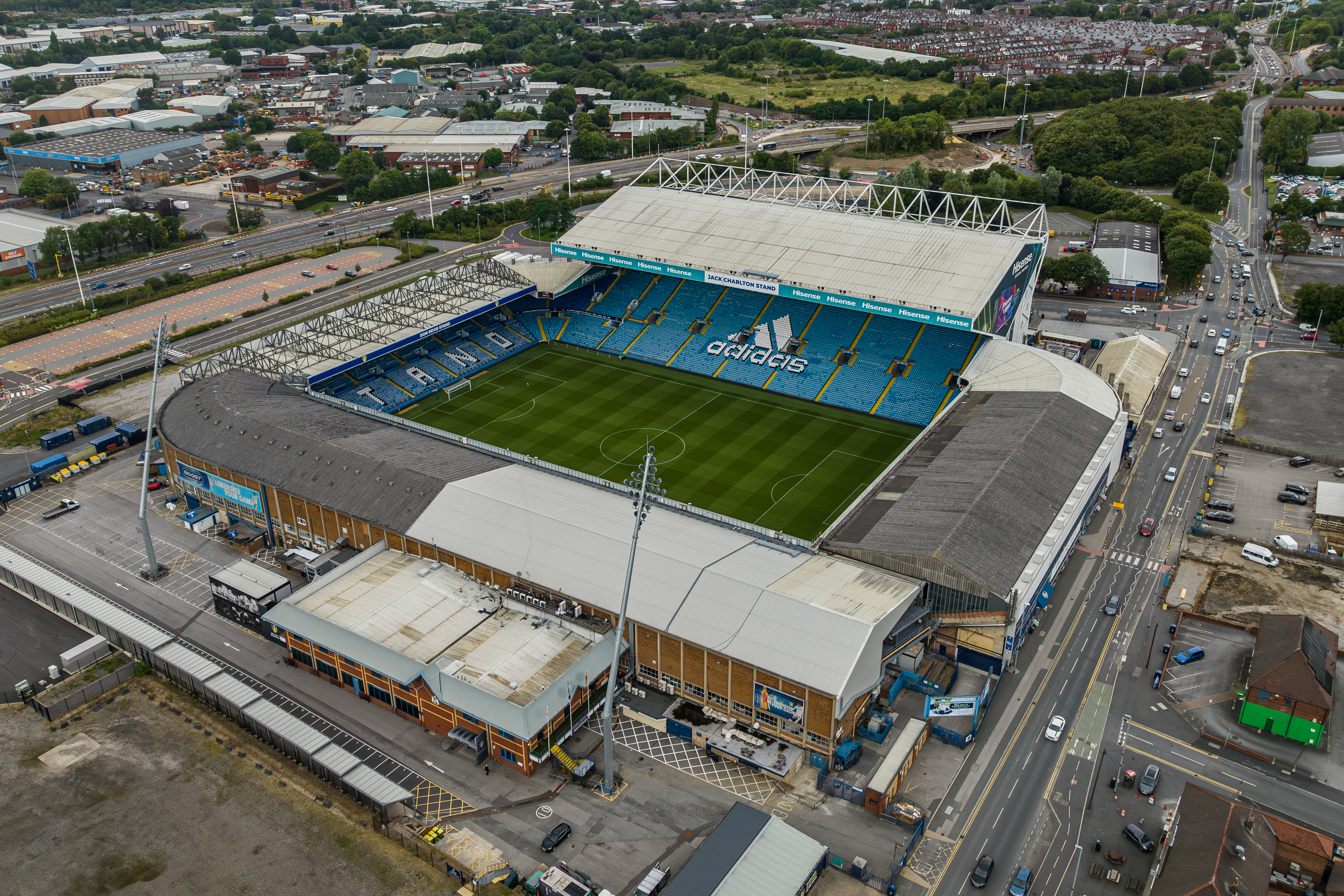

== Results ==
=== Tournament matches ===
16 October

New Zealand	16–16	Australia
Tries: Vinnie Anderson; Louis Anderson; Francis Meli; Goals: Brent Webb 2/3	Report	Tries: Luke Rooney (2); Anthony Minichiello; Goals: Darren Lockyer 2/3

North Harbour Stadium, Auckland
Attendance: 19,118
Referee: Russel Smith (England)

New Zealand	Position	Australia
Brent Webb	FB	Anthony Minichiello
Francis Meli	WG	Luke Rooney
Nigel Vagana	CE	Shaun Berrigan
Paul Whatuira	CE	Willie Tonga
Matt Utai	WG	Matt Sing
Vinnie Anderson	FE	Darren Lockyer (c)
Thomas Leuluai	HB	Craig Gower
Jason Cayless	PR	Shane Webcke
Louis Anderson	HK	Danny Buderus
Ruben Wiki (c)	PR	Jason Ryles
Tony Puletua	SR	Willie Mason
Joe Galuvao	SR	Nathan Hindmarsh
Sonny Bill Williams	LK	Tonie Carroll
Motu Tony	Int.	Craig Wing
Roy Asotasi	Int.	Petero Civoniceva
Nathan Cayless	Int.	Ben Kennedy
David Kidwell	Int.	Andrew Ryan
Daniel Anderson	Coach	Wayne Bennett

23 October

Australia	32–12	New Zealand
Tries: Luke Rooney; Darren Lockyer; Willie Tonga; Shaun Berrigan; Petero Civoniceva; Goals: Craig Fitzgibbon (3/4); Darren Lockyer (2/2); Shaun Berrigan (1/1)	Report	Tries: Brent Webb; Lesley Vainikolo; Vinnie Anderson; Goals: Brent Webb (0/3)

Loftus Road, London
Attendance: 16,725
Referee: Russel Smith (England)

Australia	Position	New Zealand
Anthony Minichiello	FB	Brent Webb
Luke Rooney	WG	Francis Meli
Shaun Berrigan	CE	Nigel Vagana
Willie Tonga	CE	Paul Whatuira
Matt Sing	WG	Lesley Vainikolo
Darren Lockyer (c)	FE	Vinnie Anderson
Craig Gower	HB	Thomas Leuluai
Shane Webcke	PR	Jason Cayless
Danny Buderus	HK	Louis Anderson
Jason Ryles	PR	Nathan Cayless
Craig Fitzgibbon	SR	Tony Puletua
Nathan Hindmarsh	SR	Ruben Wiki (c)
Tonie Carroll	LK	Sonny Bill Williams
Craig Wing	Int.	Robbie Paul
Petero Civoniceva	Int.	Roy Asotasi
Willie Mason	Int.	Paul Rauhihi
Shaun Timmins	Int.	David Kidwell
Wayne Bennett	Coach	Daniel Anderson

30 October

Great Britain	8–12	Australia
Tries: Martin Gleeson; Brian Carney; Goals: Andy Farrell (0/2)	Report	Tries: Willie Mason; Luke Rooney (2); Goals: Brett Kimmorley (0/3)

City of Manchester Stadium, Manchester
Attendance: 38,572
Referee: Glen Black (New Zealand)

Great Britain	Position	Australia
Paul Wellens	FB	Anthony Minichiello
Brian Carney	WG	Luke Rooney
Martin Gleeson	CE	Shaun Berrigan
Keith Senior	CE	Willie Tonga
Stuart Reardon	WG	Matt Sing
Paul Sculthorpe	SO/FE	Craig Gower
Sean Long	SH/HB	Brett Kimmorley
Stuart Fielden	PR	Shane Webcke
Terry Newton	HK	Danny Buderus (c)
Adrian Morley	PR	Jason Ryles
Jamie Peacock	SR	Andrew Ryan
Andy Farrell (c)	SR	Nathan Hindmarsh
Gareth Ellis	LK/LF	Tonie Carroll
Chev Walker	Int.	Craig Wing
Stephen Wild	Int.	Petero Civoniceva
Ryan Bailey	Int.	Willie Mason
Danny McGuire	Int.	Shaun Timmins
Brian Noble	Coach	Wayne Bennett

6 November

Great Britain	22–12	New Zealand
Tries: Terry Newton; Stuart Reardon (2); Goals: Andy Farrell (2/2); Iestyn Harris (2/2); Paul Sculthorpe (1/3)	Report	Tries: Ali Lauiti'iti; Sonny Bill Williams; Goals: Brent Webb (2/2)

Galpharm Stadium, Huddersfield
Attendance: 20,372
Referee: Tim Mander (Australia)

Great Britain	Position	New Zealand
Paul Wellens	FB	Brent Webb
Brian Carney	WG	Francis Meli
Martin Gleeson	CE	Nigel Vagana
Keith Senior	CE	Clinton Toopi
Stuart Reardon	WG	Shontayne Hape
Danny McGuire	SO/FE	Vinnie Anderson
Sean Long	SH/HB	Thomas Leuluai
Stuart Fielden	PR	Jason Cayless
Terry Newton	HK	Louis Anderson
Adrian Morley	PR	Ruben Wiki (c)
Jamie Peacock	SR	Logan Swann
Andy Farrell (c)	SR	David Kidwell
Paul Sculthorpe	LK/LF	Sonny Bill Williams
Gareth Ellis	Int.	Robbie Paul
Ryan Bailey	Int.	Nathan Cayless
Paul Johnson	Int.	Paul Rauhihi
Iestyn Harris	Int.	Ali Lauiti'iti
Brian Noble	Coach	Daniel Anderson

13 November

Great Britain	24–12	Australia
Tries: Terry Newton; Stuart Reardon; Stuart Fielden; Keith Senior; Goals: Andy Farrell (4/4)	Report	Tries: Luke Rooney; Mark O'Meley; Goals: Craig Fitzgibbon (1/1); Brett Kimmorley (1/1)

JJB Stadium, Wigan
Attendance: 25,004
Referee: Glen Black (New Zealand)

Great Britain	Position	Australia
Paul Wellens	FB	Anthony Minichiello
Brian Carney	WG	Matt Sing
Martin Gleeson	CE	Shaun Berrigan
Keith Senior	CE	Willie Tonga
Stuart Reardon	WG	Luke Rooney
Danny McGuire	SO/FE	Scott Hill
Sean Long	SH/HB	Brett Kimmorley
Stuart Fielden	PR	Shane Webcke
Terry Newton	HK	Danny Buderus (c)
Adrian Morley	PR	Petero Civoniceva
Jamie Peacock	SR	Craig Fitzgibbon
Andy Farrell (c)	SR	Nathan Hindmarsh
Paul Sculthorpe	LK/LF	Tonie Carroll
Gareth Ellis	Int.	Craig Wing
Ryan Bailey	Int.	Andrew Ryan
Paul Johnson	Int.	Willie Mason
Iestyn Harris	Int.	Mark O'Meley
Brian Noble	Coach	Wayne Bennett

20 November

Great Britain	26–24	New Zealand
Tries: Keith Senior; Brian Carney (2); Andy Farrell; Paul Johnson; Goals: Andy Farrell (3/5)	Report	Tries: Vinnie Anderson; Nigel Vagana; Alex Chan; Shontayne Hape; Goals: Brent Webb (4/5)

KC Stadium, Hull
Attendance: 23,377
Referee: Tim Mander (Australia)

Great Britain	Position	New Zealand
Paul Wellens	FB	Brent Webb
Brian Carney	WG	Francis Meli
Martin Gleeson	CE	Nigel Vagana
Keith Senior	CE	Clinton Toopi
Stuart Reardon	WG	Shontayne Hape
Iestyn Harris	SO/FE	Vinnie Anderson
Danny McGuire	SH/HB	Thomas Leuluai
Stuart Fielden	PR	Jason Cayless
Matt Diskin	HK	Louis Anderson
Adrian Morley	PR	Paul Rauhihi (c)
Gareth Ellis	SR	Logan Swann
Andy Farrell (c)	SR	Ali Lauiti'iti
Sean O'Loughlin	LK/LF	Wairangi Koopu
Mickey Higham	Int.	Dene Halatau
Chev Walker	Int.	Roy Asotasi
Paul Johnson	Int.	Nathan Cayless
Danny Ward	Int.	Alex Chan
Brian Noble	Coach	Daniel Anderson

=== Tournament standings ===
Team	Played	Won	Drew	Lost	For	Against	Difference	Points
Great Britain	4	3	0	1	80	60	+20	6
Australia	4	2	1	1	72	60	+12	5
New Zealand	4	0	1	3	64	95	−32	1

=== Final ===
27 November

Great Britain	4–44	Australia
Tries: Stuart Reardon Goals: Andy Farrell (0/1)	Report	Tries: Anthony Minichiello (2); Willie Tonga (2); Matt Sing; Darren Lockyer; Willie Mason; Goals: Darren Lockyer (6/6); Craig Fitzgibbon (2/2)

Elland Road, Leeds
Attendance: 39,120
Referee: Russell Smith (England)
Player of the Match: Darren Lockyer

Great Britain	Position	Australia
Paul Wellens	FB	Anthony Minichiello
Brian Carney	WG	Luke Rooney
Martin Gleeson	CE	Shaun Berrigan
Keith Senior	CE	Willie Tonga
Stuart Reardon	WG	Matt Sing
Iestyn Harris	SO/FE	Darren Lockyer (c)
Sean Long	SH/HB	Brett Kimmorley
Stuart Fielden	PR	Shane Webcke
Terry Newton	HK	Danny Buderus
Adrian Morley	PR	Petero Civoniceva
Jamie Peacock	SR	Andrew Ryan
Andy Farrell (c)	SR	Nathan Hindmarsh
Paul Sculthorpe	LF/LK	Tonie Carroll
Danny McGuire	Int.	Craig Wing
Paul Johnson	Int.	Mark O'Meley
Ryan Bailey	Int.	Craig Fitzgibbon
Sean O'Loughlin	Int.	Willie Mason
Brian Noble	Coach	Wayne Bennett

== Player statistics ==
Top point scorers
	Player	Team	T	G	FG	Pts
1	Darren Lockyer	Australia	2	10	0	28
2	Luke Rooney	Australia	6	0	0	24
3	Andy Farrell	Great Britain	1	9	0	22
4	Brent Webb	New Zealand	1	8	0	20
5	Stuart Reardon	Great Britain	4	0	0	16

Top try scorers
	Player	Team	T
1	Luke Rooney	Australia	6
2	Stuart Reardon	Great Britain	4
3	Anthony Minichiello	Australia	3
3	Willie Tonga	Australia	3
3	Brian Carney	Great Britain	3
3	Vinnie Anderson	New Zealand	3

=== Non-series Tests ===
During the series, Australia and New Zealand both played an additional test match against France.

2004-11-12

France	20–24	New Zealand

Stade d'Albert Domec, Carcassonne
Attendance: 8000

2004-11-21

France	30–52	Australia

Stade Ernest Wellon, Toulouse
Attendance: 10,000

=== Additional Matches ===
A one-off match was also played between an ANZAC side made up of touring Australian and New Zealand players and a Cumbria side.

2004-10-27

Cumbria	12–64	ANZAC Combination

Derwent Park, Workington
Attendance: 4,203

On their way back to Australia just four days after the Tri-Nations Final, the Kangaroos played a match, known as the Liberty Bell Cup against the USA at the Franklin Field in Philadelphia. Played in quarters instead of halves, and on a synthetic field that was the size of a Grid iron field, the American's shocked the Australians by racing to an 18–0 lead nearing half time and actually went into the long break with a 24–6 lead. They managed to keep their lead until late in the game when the fitness of the Australians, who had bombed numerous try scoring opportunities through the game, told and the Kangaroos overhauled the home team to win 36–24.

2004-12-1

United States	24–36	Australia

Franklin Field, Philadelphia
Attendance: 4,500
