= 1996 Great Britain Lions tour =

- Date: 25 September 1996 – 1 November 1996
- Manager: Phil Lowe
- Coach(es): Phil Larder
- Tour captain(s): Andy Farrell
- Top point scorer(s): Bobbie Goulding (63)
- Top try scorer(s): Karle Hammond (5)
Summary
P	W	D	L
Total
10	4	1	5
Test match
5	2	0	3
Opponent
P	W	D	L
Papua New Guinea
1	1	0	0
Fiji
1	1	0	0
New Zealand
3	0	0	3

Tour chronology
- Previous tour: 1992
- Next tour: 2019

The 1996 Great Britain Lions tour was a rugby league tour by the Great Britain team which took place from September to November 1996. The tour included games in Papua New Guinea, Fiji and New Zealand, however due to the ongoing Super League war and with the Australian team under the control of the Australian Rugby League, the team did not play any matches in Australia. The tour was generally considered as a disaster, with Great Britain failing to win any games in New Zealand, and several players being sent home early from the tour in order to cut costs.

== Touring squad ==
Great Britain coach Phil Larder selected a 32-man squad to take on the tour. A notable omission from the squad was Martin Offiah, who took part in the previous three Great Britain tours, but had told Larder he did not have the enthusiasm for another six-week tour. Several changes were made to the initial squad selected, as Gary Connolly, Lee Jackson and Jason Robinson were informed they would not be allowed to play due to their contracts with the ARL. There were also a number of other withdrawals, with John Bentley returning to rugby union, and Shaun Edwards, Paul Newlove and Steve McNamara all ruled out due to injury.

Former Wigan second row forward Denis Betts, who was playing with the New Zealand-based Auckland Warriors in the Australian Rugby League premiership, made history with his selection. The 25 test veteran became the first player selected to tour while playing in the Australian premiership and not in the English premiership.

Larder's assistant coaches on the tour were Clive Griffiths and Gary Hetherington and the tour manager was Phil Lowe. Andy Farrell was appointed as the tour captain, with Denis Betts named as vice-captain.

Prior to the Second Test against New Zealand, 11 players in the squad were sent home early from the tour as a cost-cutting measure. (Note: Keith Senior was initially one of 12 players to be sent home, but was later recalled to the squad.)

Name	Club	Position	Appearances	Tests	Tries	Goals	DGs	Points
Denis Betts (vc)	Auckland Warriors	Second-row	6	5	3	0	0	12
David Bradbury	Oldham	Second-row	4	0	2	0	0	8
Paul Broadbent	Sheffield Eagles	Prop	6	5	0	0	0	0
Mick Cassidy	Wigan Warriors	Second-row	5	1	2	0	0	8
Jason Critchley	Keighley Cougars	Wing	3	0	1	0	0	4
Keiron Cunningham	St Helens	Hooker	6	5	2	0	0	8
Bernard Dwyer	Bradford Bulls	Prop	4	1	1	0	0	4
Andy Farrell (c)	Wigan Warriors	Loose forward	6	5	1	0	0	4
Bobbie Goulding	St Helens	Scrum-half	6	5	4	23	1	63
Karle Hammond	St Helens	Stand-off	6	2	5	0	0	20
Neil Harmon	Leeds Rhinos	Prop	4	0	0	0	0	0
Iestyn Harris	Warrington Wolves	Stand-off	6	5	0	3	0	6
Joey Hayes	St Helens	Wing	3	1	2	0	0	8
Alan Hunte	St Helens	Wing	6	5	4	0	0	16
Chris Joynt	St Helens	Second-row	6	4	0	0	0	0
James Lowes	Bradford Bulls	Hooker	4	0	2	0	0	8
Barrie-Jon Mather	Western Reds	Centre	5	2	1	0	0	4
Nathan McAvoy	Salford Red Devils	Wing	1	0	0	0	0	0
Brian McDermott	Bradford Bulls	Prop	4	1	0	0	0	0
Steve Molloy	Featherstone Rovers	Prop	6	2	0	0	0	0
Adrian Morley	Leeds Rhinos	Second-row	6	2	1	0	0	4
Terry O'Connor	Wigan Warriors	Prop	6	4	0	0	0	0
Rowland Phillips	Workington Town	Loose forward	4	1	0	0	0	0
Daryl Powell	Keighley Cougars	Centre	7	5	3	0	0	12
Steve Prescott	St Helens	Fullback	4	0	1	17	0	38
Kris Radlinski	Wigan Warriors	Fullback	6	5	2	0	0	8
Jon Roper	Warrington Wolves	Wing	3	0	0	0	0	0
Paul Sculthorpe	Warrington Wolves	Loose forward	6	5	0	0	0	0
Keith Senior	Sheffield Eagles	Centre	6	2	3	0	0	12
Tony Smith	Castleford Tigers	Scrum-half	5	2	4	0	0	16
Stuart Spruce	Bradford Bulls	Fullback	6	5	3	0	0	12
Anthony Sullivan	St Helens	Wing	6	4	3	0	0	12
Tulsen Tollett	London Broncos	Stand-off	5	0	1	0	0	4

== Papua New Guinea ==
25 September 1996	PNG President's XIII	8 – 34	Great Britain	Rebiamul Oval, Mount Hagen
	Tries: Itam, Tiki; Goals:	[ Report]	Tries: Senior, Bradbury, Hammond, Lowes, Smith (2); Goals: Prescott (5)	Attendance: 2,059; Referee: Anthony Kuni (Port Moresby)

28 September 1996

Papua New Guinea	30 – 32	Great Britain
Tries: Ben Biri (2); Robert Sio; David Gomia; Stanley Gene; Adrian Lam; Goals: Elias Paiyo (3)		Tries: Kris Radlinski (2); Anthony Sullivan; Bobbie Goulding; Keiron Cunningham Goals: Bobbie Goulding (6)

Lae Oval, Lae
Attendance: 10,000
Referee: Steve Clark (Australia)

Papua New Guinea	Great Britain

FB	1	Robert Sio
RW	2	James Kops
RC	3	Marcus Bai
LC	4	Robert Tela
LW	5	David Gomia
FE	6	Stanley Gene
HB	7	Adrian Lam (c)
PR	8	Ben Biri
HK	9	Elias Paiyo
PR	10	Raymond Kahl
SR	11	Nande Yer
SR	12	David Westley
LF	13	Bruce Mamando
Substitutions:
IC	14	Simon Kundi
IC	15	Ruben Ruing
IC	16	Max Tiri
IC	17	Obert Batia
Coach:

FB	1	Stuart Spruce
RW	2	Joey Hayes
RC	3	Kris Radlinski
LC	4	Alan Hunte
LW	5	Anthony Sullivan
SO	6	Iestyn Harris
SH	7	Bobbie Goulding
PR	8	Paul Broadbent
HK	9	Keiron Cunningham
PR	10	Terry O'Connor
SR	11	Denis Betts
SR	12	Chris Joynt
LK	13	Andy Farrell (c)
Substitutions:
IC	14	Tony Smith
IC	15	Rowland Phillips
IC	16	Daryl Powell
IC	17	Paul Sculthorpe
Coach:Bob Bennett
(England) Phil Larder

== Fiji ==
2 October 1996	Fiji President's XIII	16 – 42	Great Britain	Churchill Park, Lautoka
	Tries: Navale, Baravilala, Koroi; Goals: Takaladau (2)	[ Report]	Tries: Hammond (3), Hayes, Senior, Critchley, Tollett, Cassidy; Goals: Prescott (5)	Attendance: 2,000; Referee: T Nunu (Fiji)

5 October 1996

Fiji	4 – 72	Great Britain
Tries: Samuela Marayawa Goals		Tries: Bobbie Goulding (3); Stuart Spruce (2); Alan Hunte (2); Daryl Powell (2); Anthony Sullivan; Andy Farrell; Keith Senior; Mick Cassidy; Goals: Bobbie Goulding (10)

Prince Charles Park, Nadi
Attendance: 5,000
Referee: Jim Stokes (New Zealand)

Fiji	Great Britain

FB	1	Waisale Sovatabua
RW	2	P. Baravilula
RC	3	Manoa Thompson
LC	4	Joe Tamani
LW	5	S. Tulevu
FE	6	I. Ratudina
HB	7	Kaleveti Naisoro
PR	8	Pio Nakubuwai (c)
HK	9	M. Kaidroki
PR	10	Malakai Kaunivalu
SR	11	Josaia Dakuitoga
SR	12	Ian Saigatu
LF	13	Livai Nalagilagi
Substitutions:
IC	14	Vula Dakuitoga
IC	15	Samuela Marayawa
IC	16	Waisale Vatubua
IC	17	Ulaiasi Wainidroa
Coach:

FB	1	Stuart Spruce
RW	2	Alan Hunte
RC	3	Kris Radlinski
LC	4	Daryl Powell
LW	5	Anthony Sullivan
SO	6	Iestyn Harris
SH	7	Bobbie Goulding
PR	8	Paul Broadbent
HK	9	Keiron Cunningham
PR	10	Brian McDermott
SR	11	Denis Betts
SR	12	Paul Sculthorpe
LK	13	Andy Farrell (c)
Substitutions:
IC	14	Tony Smith
IC	15	Keith Senior
IC	16	Steve Molloy
IC	17	Mick Cassidy
Coach:
(England) Phil Larder

== New Zealand ==
10 October 1996	Lion Red Cup XIII	22 – 22	Great Britain	Carlaw Park, Auckland
	Tries: Barlow, Hughes, Malietoa-Brown; Goals: Lythe (5)	[ Report]	Tries: Sullivan, Spruce, Cunningham, Powell, Goals: Harris (3)	Attendance: 3,000; Referee: G Wallace (Auckland)

15 October 1996	New Zealand XIII	30 – 22	Great Britain	Fraser Park, Wellington
	Tries: Endacott (2), Ropati, Okesene, Taewa, A. Swann; Goals: Murray (2) Whittaker	[ Report]	Tries: Hayes, Mather, Smith, Hammond; Goals: Prescott (3)	Attendance: 2,000; Referee: Denis Hale (Auckland)

=== First Test ===
18 October 1996

New Zealand	17 – 12	Great Britain
Tries: John Timu (2) Goals: Matthew Ridge (4); Field Goals: Matthew Ridge		Tries: Alan Hunte; Denis Betts; Goals: Bobbie Goulding (2)

Ericsson Stadium, Auckland
Attendance: 7,400
Referee: Bill Harrigan (Australia)

New Zealand	Great Britain

FB	1	Matthew Ridge (c)
RW	2	Sean Hoppe
RC	3	Richie Blackmore
LC	4	John Timu
LW	5	Richie Barnett
FE	6	Gene Ngamu
HB	7	Stacey Jones
PR	8	Grant Young
HK	9	Syd Eru
PR	10	Quentin Pongia
SR	11	Tony Iro
SR	12	Stephen Kearney
LF	13	Tyran Smith
Substitutions:
IC	14	Marc Ellis
IC	15	Joe Vagana
IC	16	Ruben Wiki
IC	17	Logan Swann
Coach:
(New Zealand) Frank Endacott

FB	1	Stuart Spruce
RW	2	Alan Hunte
RC	3	Kris Radlinski
LC	4	Daryl Powell
LW	5	Anthony Sullivan
SO	6	Iestyn Harris
SH	7	Bobbie Goulding
PR	8	Paul Broadbent
HK	9	Keiron Cunningham
PR	10	Terry O'Connor
SR	11	Denis Betts
SR	12	Paul Sculthorpe
LK	13	Andy Farrell (c)
Substitutions:
IC	14	Tony Smith
IC	15	Chris Joynt
IC	16	Keith Senior
IC	17	Adrian Morley
Coach:
(England) Phil Larder

22 October 1996	Māori	40 – 28	Great Britain	Lowe Walker Stadium, Whangārei
	Tries: Stevens, Nikau, Murray (2), Ramsey, Gardiner, Walker; Goals: Howell (6)	[ Report]	Tries: Dwyer, Smith, Bradbury, Prescott, Lowes; Goals: Prescott (4)	Attendance: 6,000; Referee: G Allcock (Auckland)

=== 2nd Test ===
25 October 1996

New Zealand	18 – 15	Great Britain
Tries: Ruben Wiki (2); Gene Ngamu; Goals: Matthew Ridge (3)		Tries: Alan Hunte; Denis Betts; Goals: Bobbie Goulding (3); Field Goal: Bobbie Goulding

Manawatu Showgrounds, Palmerston North
Attendance: 9,000
Referee: Graham Annesley (Australia)

New Zealand	Great Britain

FB	1	Matthew Ridge (c)
RW	2	Sean Hoppe
RC	3	Ruben Wiki
LC	4	John Timu
LW	5	Richie Barnett
FE	6	Gene Ngamu
HB	7	Stacey Jones
PR	8	Grant Young
HK	9	Syd Eru
PR	10	Quentin Pongia
SR	11	Tony Iro
SR	12	Stephen Kearney
LF	13	Tyran Smith
Substitutions:
IC	14	Marc Ellis
IC	15	Joe Vagana
IC	16	Richie Blackmore
IC	17	Logan Swann
Coach:
(New Zealand) Frank Endacott

FB	1	Stuart Spruce
RW	2	Alan Hunte
RC	3	Kris Radlinski
LC	4	Daryl Powell
LW	5	Anthony Sullivan
SO	6	Iestyn Harris
SH	7	Bobbie Goulding
PR	8	Paul Broadbent
HK	9	Keiron Cunningham
PR	10	Terry O'Connor
SR	11	Denis Betts
SR	12	Paul Sculthorpe
LK	13	Andy Farrell (c)
Substitutions:
IC	14	Barrie-Jon Mather
IC	15	Karle Hammond
IC	16	Steve Molloy
IC	17	Chris Joynt
Coach:
(England) Phil Larder

=== 3rd Test ===
1 November 1996

New Zealand	32 – 12	Great Britain
Tries: Sean Hoppe (2); Marc Ellis; Ruben Wiki; Gene Ngamu; Matthew Ridge; Goals: Matthew Ridge (4)		Tries: Denis Betts; Adrian Morley Goals: Bobbie Goulding (2)

Lancaster Park, Christchurch
Attendance: 9,000
Referee: Steve Clark (Australia)

New Zealand	Great Britain

FB	1	Matthew Ridge (c)
RW	2	Sean Hoppe
RC	3	Ruben Wiki
LC	4	John Timu
LW	5	Marc Ellis
FE	6	Gene Ngamu
HB	7	Stacey Jones
PR	8	Grant Young
HK	9	Syd Eru
PR	10	Quentin Pongia
SR	11	Tony Iro
SR	12	Stephen Kearney
LF	13	Tyran Smith
Substitutions:
IC	14	Anthony Swann
IC	15	Joe Vagana
IC	16	Richie Blackmore
IC	17	Logan Swann
Coach:
(New Zealand) Frank Endacott

FB	1	Stuart Spruce
RW	2	Alan Hunte
RC	3	Kris Radlinski
LC	4	Daryl Powell
LW	5	Barrie-Jon Mather
SO	6	Karle Hammond
SH	7	Bobbie Goulding
PR	8	Paul Broadbent
HK	9	Keiron Cunningham
PR	10	Terry O'Connor
SR	11	Denis Betts
SR	12	Paul Sculthorpe
LK	13	Andy Farrell (c)
Substitutions:
IC	14	Iestyn Harris
IC	15	Adrian Morley
IC	16	Chris Joynt
IC	17	Bernard Dwyer
Coach:
(England) Phil Larder

== Aftermath ==
The tour was considered a huge failure. It was only the second time in tour history that the Lions had suffered a 3–0 whitewash in a Test series against New Zealand (the other being in 1984), and the 12–32 loss in the Third Test was the widest margin of defeat suffered by Great Britain in a Test against New Zealand. Financially, the tour made a loss of £296,000.

The lack of success was attributed to the large number of key players who were unavailable for the tour, and the blow to morale caused by sending some of the squad home early. Fatigue was also an issue - due to the British rugby league season switching from winter to summer the previous year, some players had taken part in over 60 games within the space of 14 months. New Zealand Rugby League president Graham Carden was blamed for the tour's financial losses, having failed to adequately promote the Test series, resulting in poor attendances. He was eventually forced to stand down the following year.

Great Britain did not tour in the Southern Hemisphere again for over 20 years until 2019.
