= Vinnie Anderson =

New Zealand international rugby league footballer

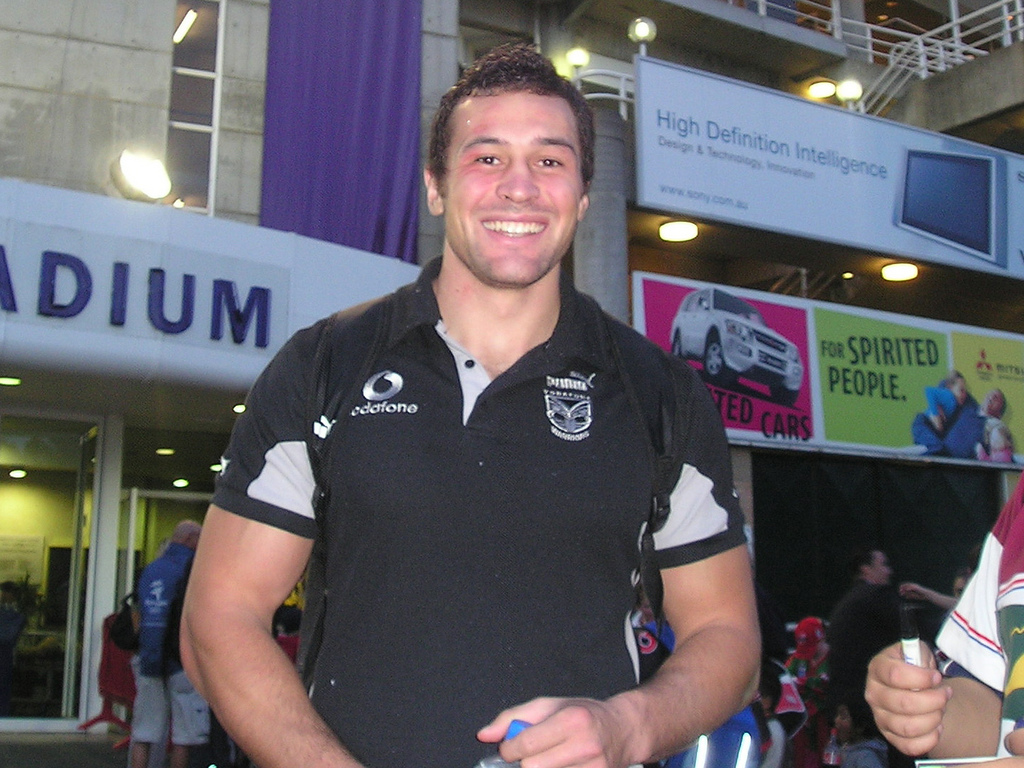

Personal information
- Full name: Vincent Manase Mohenoa Anderson
- Born: 2 February 1979 (age 46) Auckland, New Zealand
- Height: 188 cm (6 ft 2 in)
- Weight: 102 kg (16 st 1 lb)

Playing information
- Position: Centre, Five-eighth, Loose forward
Club
Years	Team	Pld	T	G	FG	P
2002–04	New Zealand Warriors	55	13	0	0	52
2005–06	St Helens	42	16	0	0	64
2007–10	Warrington Wolves	88	31	0	0	124
2011–12	Salford City Reds	37	14	0	0	56
2012–16	AS Carcassonne	38	21	0	0	84
2017–23	Villegailhenc-Aragon XIII
	Total	260	95	0	0	380
Representative
Years	Team	Pld	T	G	FG	P
2003–06	New Zealand	6	5	0	0	20

Coaching information
Club
Years	Team	Gms	W	D	L	W%
2017	Villegailhenc-Aragon XIII
- Source: As of 1 May 2023
- Relatives: Fraser Anderson (brother); Louis Anderson (brother)

Vincent Manase Mohenoa Anderson (born 2 February 1979) is a New Zealand professional rugby league footballer who is player/coach for Villegailhenc-Aragon XIII in the Elite Two Championship. A New Zealand international representative loose forward or stand-off, he previously played for St Helens, Warrington Wolves and the Salford City Reds in the Super League, the New Zealand Warriors in the NRL and Elite One Championship side AS Carcassonne.

== Background ==
He is the elder brother of Louis and Fraser Anderson, and is a member of the Church of Jesus Christ of Latter-day Saints.

== Early years ==
Anderson played for Northcote Tigers and Mount Albert Lions in the Auckland Rugby League competition before transferring to East Coast Bays Barracudas to play alongside his father Warrick. His father later coached the Barracudas to the 2003 Fox Memorial title.

== New Zealand Warriors ==
Anderson debuted for New Zealand Warriors in Round 17 of the 2002 National Rugby League, playing against Cronulla at Toyota Park on 7 July 2002. That year the New Zealand went on to the 2002 NRL Grand Final, which they lost 30–8 to the Sydney Roosters. In 2003 he played centre as New Zealand Warriors fell one victory short of a consecutive Grand Final appearance. At the end of 2003 Anderson made his International début for New Zealand national rugby league team in the 100th match between the New Zealand and the Australian team. His brother, Louis, also made his debut in the same match. Playing as a centre, Anderson scored two tries as the Kiwis won 30–16. Anderson also played stand-off for the 2004 New Zealand Tri-Nations side. The campaign was unsuccessful although he did manage to score tries in all but one of the 4 test matches against Australia and Great Britain. The tour also saw the start of brother Louis Anderson's Test career. Before departing at the start of the 2005 NRL season for the Super League, Anderson had carved a reputation for tough tackling and good ball skills.

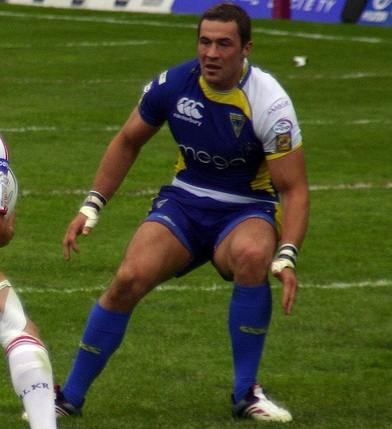
Anderson playing for Warrington

== St Helens ==
Anderson signed St. Helens in 2005 after the Rugby Football League refused to register him as a London Broncos player because of the London sides financial problems at the time. Anderson fit well into the St Helens flamboyant style of rugby league and formed a deadly right-hand side combination with Jamie Lyon and Darren Albert. In his two years at St. Helens they finished as League Leaders in 2005 and then won both the Challenge Cup and Super League in 2006.

== Warrington ==
Anderson joined Warrington in 2007 for £50,000. He was joined at Warrington in the 2008 season by brother Louis Anderson, who signed for the club from New Zealand Warriors. Anderson played stand-off for Warrington in the 2009 Challenge Cup Final, scoring a try in the process of defeating Huddersfield 25–16. He played in the 2010 Challenge Cup Final victory over Leeds at Wembley Stadium.

== Salford ==
Anderson joined Salford in 2011.

== France ==
Due to the uncertainty surrounding the financial situation of the Salford City Reds at the end of 2012, Anderson left to join AS Carcassonne in France. Anderson would play 4 seasons at Carcassonne before joining Villegailhenc-Aragon XIII as a player/coach from 2016 to 2023. In France, Anderson appeared in multiple finals and most notably won the Cup and League "double" in 2017 with Villegailhenc-Aragon.
