= Adrian Flynn =

English rugby league footballer

Personal information
- Full name: Adrian Flynn
- Born: 9 September 1974 (age 51)

Playing information
- Position: Wing
Club
| Years | Team | Pld | T | G | FG | P |
|---|---|---|---|---|---|---|
| 1992–95 | Wakefield Trinity | 59 | 13 | 0 | 0 | 52 |
| 1995–97 | Castleford Tigers | 41 | 21 | 0 | 0 | 84 |
| 1997 | Keighley Cougars | 11 | 3 | 0 | 0 | 12 |
| 1997–02 | Dewsbury Rams | 160 | 97 | 0 | 0 | 388 |
| 2003 | Featherstone Rovers | 32 | 15 | 0 | 0 | 60 |
| 2004–05 | Batley Bulldogs | 40 | 21 | 0 | 0 | 84 |
| | Total | 343 | 170 | 0 | 0 | 680 |
- Relatives: Wayne Flynn (brother)

Adrian Flynn (born 9 September 1974) is a former professional rugby league footballer who played in the 1990s and 2000s. He played as a wing at the club level for Wakefield Trinity, the Castleford Tigers, the Dewsbury Rams, Featherstone Rovers, and the Batley Bulldogs.

== Playing career ==
=== Club career ===
Adrian Flynn made his début for Wakefield Trinity in October 1992 and played his last match there during the 1994–95 season. He was transferred to the Castleford Tigers in July 1995. He moved from Castleford to the Keighley Cougars as part of an exchange deal for Jason Critchley. He then moved on to the Dewsbury Rams. He was transferred from Dewsbury to Featherstone Rovers, making his début there on Sunday 19 January 2003, and played his last match for them during the 2003 season.

== Genealogical information ==
Adrian Flynn is the older brother of the rugby league footballer, Wayne Flynn.
