= Saddleworth School =

Location
- Huddersfield Road, Diggle; Oldham, Greater Manchester, OL3 5NU; England; 53°33′40.2″N 1°59′57.79″W

Information
- Type: Community secondary school
- Motto: Aim High
- Established: c. 1911
- Local authority: Oldham Council
- Trust: Cranmer Education Trust
- Department for Education URN: 151361 Tables
- Ofsted: Reports
- Head teacher: Sheldon Logue
- Gender: Mixed
- Age range: 11–16
- Enrolment: 1,444 (2026-2027)
- Capacity: 1,406
- Campus size: 18 acres
- Campus type: Urban
- Website: www.saddleworth.oldham.sch.uk

Saddleworth School is a community secondary school in Diggle, England, for students in years 7–11.

== Saddleworth School ==
Saddleworth School is a secondary school in Saddleworth, Greater Manchester currently under the control of the Cranmer Educational Trust headed by Julie Hollis CEO.

== Leadership ==
Sheldon Logue serves as headteacher succeeding Jimmy Christian the interim headteacher. Sheldon's management style has proved controversial since starting his tenure at Saddleworth school with controversies over the updated uniform policy and tough approach towards SENCO support.

== Administration ==
In 2024 Saddleworth School was taken over by the Cranmer Educational Trust following a requires improvement OFSTED, the Cranmer Trust led large reforms within Saddleworth school getting rid of a large amount of staff and assistant headteachers alongside the headteacher Mike Anderson in the first 18 months of their tenure.

== Legacy ==
Mike Anderson the former headteacher 2019-2026 led large amounts of reform throughout the school bringing in a strong leadership team and large reforms to benefit the school. Mike Anderson resigned in on the 23rd February 2026 the reason for this is unknown and was a large shock to the school community as a whole.

Mike Anderson was known for his positive approach towards SENCO and delivering record results for the school which was why there was a large shock when he suddenly resigned following a meeting with the trust in January.

== History ==
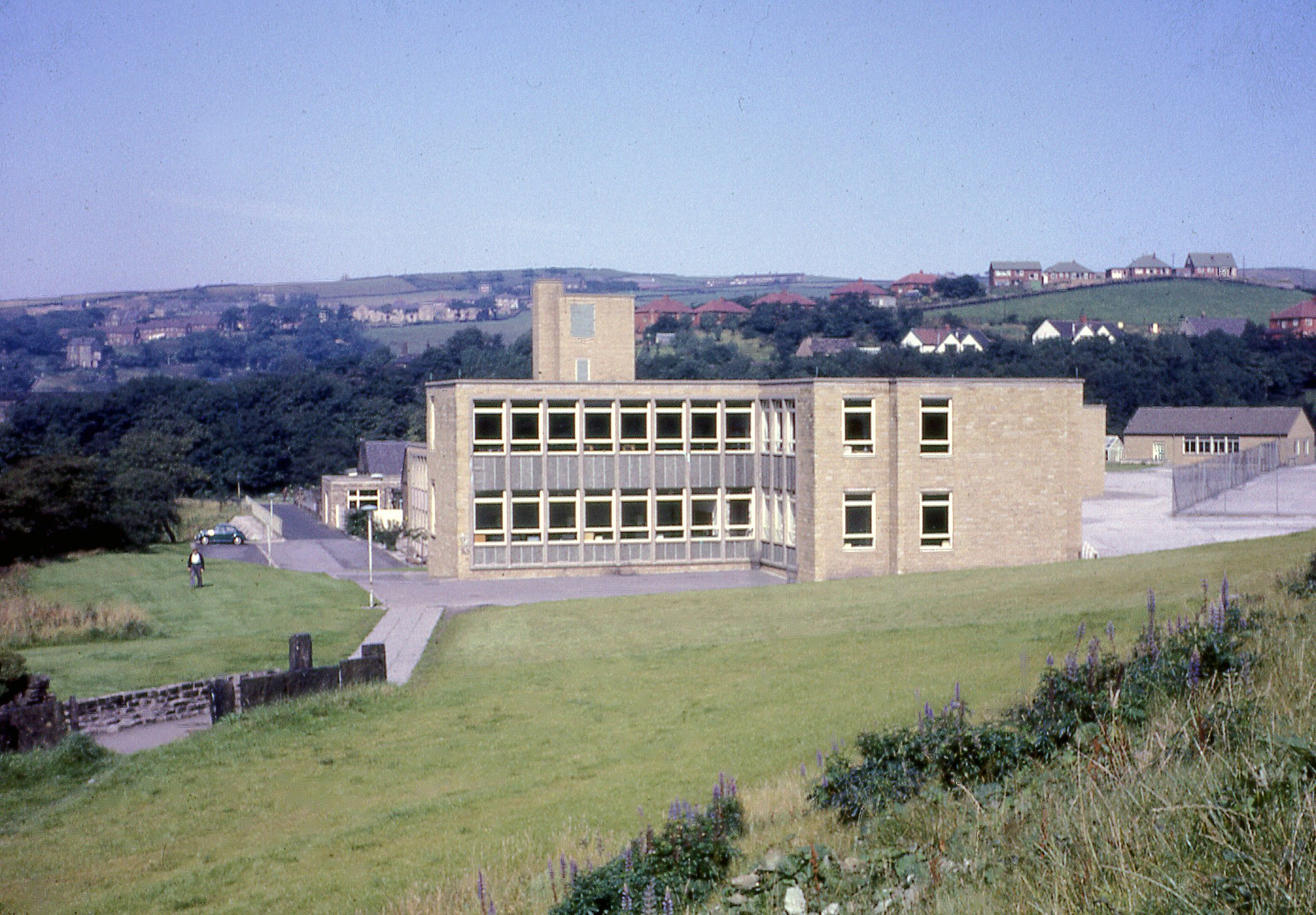
Saddleworth school in the Later 1960s

Saddleworth School's Front area underconstruction Somepoint in the early 1960s or late 1950s

First built in 1911 as a junior and infants school, Saddleworth School was expanded to a secondary school sometime between 1960 and 1970.

It also formally hosted a 6th form language course however this was ended sometime in the early 2000s

In July 2020, construction of a new campus began at the former site of W.H. Shaw Pallet Works in Diggle at a cost of £27 million. On the 12th of March 2022, the school was moved to the new site.

== Notable alumni ==
- Kevin Sinfield, rugby union coach, former professional rugby league footballer, and charity fundraiser
- Mike Ford, rugby union coach and former professional rugby league footballer
- Victoria Bateman (née Powell), feminist economist and academic
- Kyle Hogg, former Lancashire and England cricketer

== Notable staff ==
- Phil Larder, former Head of Physical Education
