= Karle Hammond =

GB & Wales international rugby league footballer

Personal information
- Full name: Karle Hammond
- Born: 25 April 1974 (age 51) Widnes, England

Playing information
- Position: Stand-off, Loose forward, Centre
Club
| Years | Team | Pld | T | G | FG | P |
|---|---|---|---|---|---|---|
| 1993–95 | Widnes | 70 | 29 | 15 | 2 | 148 |
| 1995–98 | St Helens | 111 | 50 | 0 | 5 | 205 |
| 1999–00 | London Broncos | 54 | 28 | 2 | 4 | 120 |
| 2001 | Widnes Vikings | 10 | 2 | 5 | 1 | 19 |
| 2001 | Salford City Reds | 5 | 1 | 0 | 0 | 4 |
| 2002 | Halifax Blue Sox | 14 | 3 | 21 | 0 | 54 |
| | Total | 264 | 113 | 43 | 12 | 550 |
Representative
| Years | Team | Pld | T | G | FG | P |
| 1996 | Great Britain | 2 | 0 | 0 | 0 | 0 |
| 1999 | Wales | 2 | 0 | 0 | 0 | 0 |

Karle Hammond (born 25 April 1974) is an English former professional rugby league footballer who played in the 1990s and 2000s. He played at representative level for Great Britain and Wales, and at club level for Widnes (two spells), and in the Super League for St. Helens, the London Broncos, the Salford City Reds, and the Halifax Blue Sox, as a stand-off, loose forward or centre.

== Background ==
Hammond was born in Widnes, Cheshire, England.

== Career ==
=== Club ===
Hammond started his career at Widnes before signing for St Helens in September 1995 for a fee of £85,000. He played stand-off in St Helens' 16–25 defeat by Wigan in the 1995–96 Regal Trophy Final during the 1995–96 at Alfred McAlpine Stadium, Huddersfield on Saturday 13 January 1996.

Hammond played as a stand-off in St Helens 40–32 victory over the Bradford Bulls in the 1996 Challenge Cup Final at Wembley Stadium, London on Saturday 27 April 1996 in front of a crowd of 78,550. He also played in the 1997 Challenge Cup final (also against Bradford Bulls) and scored a try in their 32–22 win.

Hammond left Saints when his contract expired at the end of the 1998 season, and signed a two-year deal with London Broncos. He played in the team's 1999 Challenge Cup final defeat against Leeds Rhinos.

He then briefly returned to Widnes before joining Salford City Reds in March 2001. He spent the following season with Halifax Blue Sox, but was released in August 2002.

=== International ===
He was the top try-scorer of the 1996 Great Britain Lions tour of Papua New Guinea, Fiji and New Zealand.

He was selected to play for Wales in the 2000 Rugby League World Cup, but was forced to withdraw from the squad due to injury.
