= Chris Morley =

Wales international rugby league footballer

Personal information
- Full name: Christopher Morley
- Born: 22 September 1973 (age 52) Salford, England

Playing information
- Position: Prop, Second-row, Loose forward
Club
Years	Team	Pld	T	G	FG	P
1994–97	St. Helens	78	8	0	0	32
1998	Warrington Wolves	12	0	0	0	0
1999	Salford City Reds	8	0	0	0	0
2000	Sheffield Eagles	21	4	0	0	16
2001–02	Leigh Centurions	51	14	0	0	56
2003	Oldham	27	4	0	0	16
2004–05	Halifax	29	3	0	0	12
2006–08	Swinton Lions	50	7	0	0	28
	Total	276	40	0	0	160
Representative
Years	Team	Pld	T	G	FG	P
1996–06	Wales	13	2	0	0	8
- Source: As of 12 February 2023
- Relatives: Adrian Morley (brother)

Christopher Morley (born 22 September 1973) is a former Wales international rugby league footballer who played in the 1990s and 2000s. He played as a prop, second-row or loose forward at club level for St Helens, Warrington, Salford, Sheffield Eagles, Leigh, Oldham, Halifax and Swinton.

== Background ==
Morley was born in Salford, Lancashire, England.

== Playing career ==
=== International honours ===
Chris Morley won caps for Wales while at St. Helens in 1996 against France (interchange/substitute), and England, while at Salford in 1999 against Ireland and Scotland, while at Sheffield Eagles in 2000 against South Africa (interchange/substitute), while at Leigh in the 2000 Rugby League World Cup against Lebanon (interchange/substitute), New Zealand, Papua New Guinea (interchange/substitute) and Australia, while at Oldham in 2001 against England, while at Halifax in 2003 against Russia, and Australia, while at Swinton in 2006 against Scotland, 1996...2006 13(14?)-caps + 4-caps (interchange/substitute) 1(2?)-try 4(8?)-points.

It was later revealed, in his brother, Adrian Morley's autobiography "Moz" that Chris Morley did not actually qualify to represent Wales, he had lied to the then Wales Assistant Coach; Mike Gregory, and that Morley's grandmother was born in a village just outside Swansea when in fact she was born in St. Helens, Lancashire, and therefore he had no Welsh qualification.

=== Challenge Cup Final appearances ===
Chris Morley was a substitute in St. Helens' 32–22 victory over Bradford Bulls in the 1997 Challenge Cup Final during Super League II at Wembley Stadium, London on Saturday 3 May 1997.

== Genealogical information ==
Chris Morley is the older brother of the rugby league footballer; Adrian Morley.
