= Wayne Flynn =

English rugby league footballer

Personal information
- Full name: Wayne Flynn
- Born: 19 November 1970 (age 54)

Playing information
- Position: Centre, Loose forward, Wing
Club
Years	Team	Pld	T	G	FG	P
1994–96	Wakefield Trinity	50	11	0	0	44
1997	Sheffield Eagles	9	0	0	0	0
1999–00	Batley Bulldogs	55	11	0	0	44
2001–04	Sheffield Eagles	77	20	0	0	90
	Total	191	42	0	0	178
- Relatives: Adrian Flynn (brother)

Wayne Flynn (born 19 November 1970) is a former professional rugby league footballer who played in the 1990s and 2000s. He played at club level for Wakefield Trinity, and the Sheffield Eagles.

== Genealogical Information ==
Wayne Flynn is the younger brother of the rugby league footballer; Adrian Flynn.
