= Fraser Anderson =

Tonga dual-code rugby international footballer (born 1984)

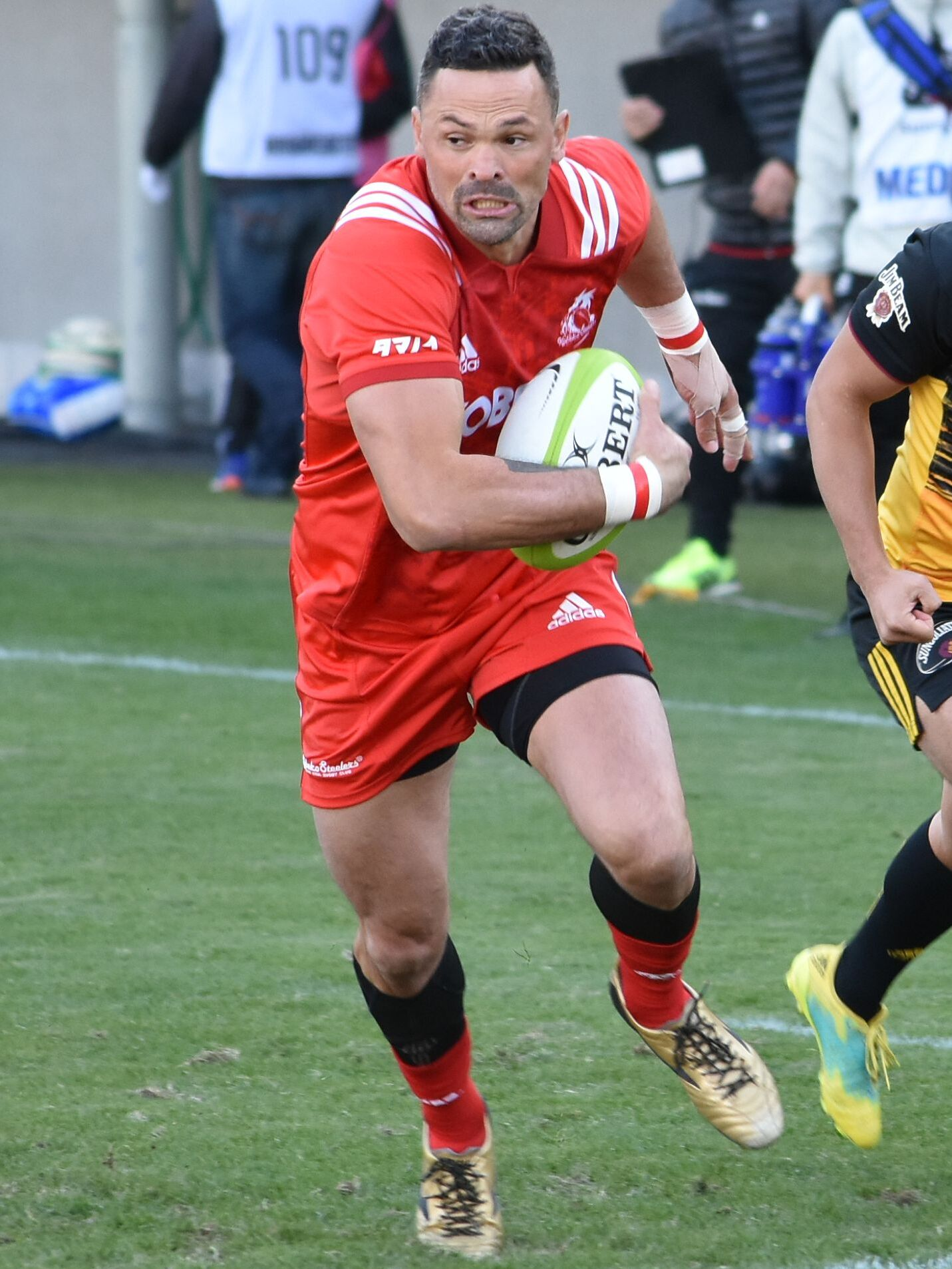

Personal information
- Full name: Fraser Anderson
- Born: 20 April 1984 (age 42) Auckland, New Zealand

Playing information
- Height: 190 cm (6 ft 3 in)
- Weight: 103 kg (16 st 3 lb)

Rugby league
- Position: Second-row, Centre, Wing
Club
Years	Team	Pld	T	G	FG	P
2006	Brisbane Broncos	2	1	0	0	4
2007–08	Cronulla Sharks	43	12	0	0	48
	Total	45	13	0	0	52

Rugby union
- Position: Wing, Centre
Club
Years	Team	Pld	T	G	FG	P
2010–2022	Kobelco Steelers	121	50	0	0	250
Representative
Years	Team	Pld	T	G	FG	P
2013–14	Tonga	4	1	0	0	5
- Relatives: Vinnie Anderson (brother); Louis Anderson (brother)

Fraser Anderson (born 20 April 1984) is a former professional rugby footballer who played rugby union for the Kobelco Steelers. Anderson previously played rugby league in the National Rugby League for Brisbane and Cronulla-Sutherland.

== Background ==
Anderson was born in Auckland, New Zealand. Anderson is of Tongan descent. He is the brother of Louis Anderson and Vinnie Anderson.

== Early years ==
Fraser Anderson attended The Church College of New Zealand. Anderson is a member of the Church of Jesus Christ of Latter-day Saints and served for two years as a missionary in Olongapo in the Philippines.

== Rugby league career ==
Anderson made his first grade rugby league debut for the Brisbane Broncos in round 14, 2006 against South Sydney Rabbitohs at Telstra Stadium.

Anderson then became a regular in the Cronulla-Sutherland Sharks line up during the 2007 and 2008 seasons, playing either in the centres or the second row. Anderson's final game in the NRL was the 2008 preliminary final match against Melbourne which Cronulla lost 28–0 at the Sydney Football Stadium.

== Representative career ==
Anderson was named in both the Tonga training squad and the New Zealand training squad for the 2008 World Cup. He did not make the New Zealand side, but was selected to play for Tonga in the World Cup.

== Rugby union career ==
On 24 February 2009 it was announced that Anderson had been granted an immediate release from his Sharks contract to take up a two-year contract with Top League Japanese rugby union club, Kobelco Steelers, worth A$400,000 per year.
