= Phil Larder =

English rugby coach (born 1945)

Personal information
- Full name: Philip John Larder
- Born: 20 March 1945 (age 81) Oldham, Lancashire, England

Playing information

Rugby union
- Position: Centre
Club
Years	Team	Pld	T	G	FG	P
	Broughton Park
	Manchester
	Sale
	Total	0	0	0	0	0

Rugby league
- Position: Centre, Wing
Club
Years	Team	Pld	T	G	FG	P
1967–80	Oldham	328	111	475	0	1283
1980–82	Whitehaven
	Total	328	111	475	0	1283

Coaching information

Rugby union
Club
Years	Team	Gms	W	D	L	W%
1998–02	Leicester Tigers
2006–08	Worcester Warriors
2011–13	Worcester Warriors
	Total	0	0	0	0
Representative
Years	Team	Gms	W	D	L	W%
1997–06	England
2001, 05	British & Irish Lions

Rugby league
Club
Years	Team	Gms	W	D	L	W%
1992–93	Widnes	33	20	1	12	61
1994–96	Keighley Cougars	9	6	0	3	67
1997	Sheffield Eagles	10	3	0	7	30
	Total	52	29	1	22	56
Representative
Years	Team	Gms	W	D	L	W%
1995–96	England	7	6	0	1	86
1996	Great Britain	5	2	0	3	40

Philip John Larder MBE (born 20 March 1945) is an English rugby league and rugby union coach, and former player in both codes.

He coached England and Great Britain national teams in rugby league, and in rugby union he was defence coach of England, and the British & Irish Lions. He coached World Cup finals with England against Australia in both codes – losing the 1995 rugby league final, before winning the 2003 final in rugby union.

Previously a physical education teacher and national coaching director of the Rugby Football League, Larder was one of the first defence coaches in professional rugby union, and is considered a pioneer in applying rugby league expertise to the defensive side of rugby union.

== Early life and playing career ==
Larder was born on 20 March 1945 in Oldham, Lancashire, and educated at Hulme Grammar School. After graduating with a degree in Physical Education and Sports Science from Loughborough University in 1965, he began work as a physical education teacher at Saddleworth School.

He played rugby union as a centre for Broughton Park, playing regularly in the first team by the age of 16. He later played for Manchester and Sale, and became known as a particularly good sevens player.

Larder found the travelling required to play rugby union incompatible with his work at Saddleworth, so moved to rugby league, where games were concentrated in the north of England. He was first approached by Leigh but opted to sign for Oldham. He played in Oldham's defeat by St. Helens in the 1968 Lancashire Cup final, and later moved to Whitehaven.

== Coaching career ==
=== Rugby league ===
Larder taught at Saddleworth School for 16 years, becoming Head of Physical Education before leaving in 1982.

In 1982, he was appointed Director of Coaching for the Rugby Football League. Following Australia's 40-4 win in the first Ashes series test over Great Britain as part of the 1982 Kangaroo tour, Larder realised that the Australians had left the British game behind and urgent change was needed. Larder spent a week with Kangaroos coach Frank Stanton before the second test in Wigan to observe the Kangaroos' coaching and training methods. Stanton first obtained approval of this from the Australian Rugby League who raised no objections. Although the Australian's had begun to dominate international rugby league since the mid-late 1970s, the ARL recognised that for the international game to grow, Britain needed to have a strong international presence.

Larder subsequently made further visits to Australia, and was influenced by coaches such as Arthur Beetson and "Supercoach" Jack Gibson, who himself had spent time in America during the 1970s studying coaching and training methods in the NFL, especially those used by successful Green Bay Packers coach Vince Lombardi. With what he had learned, Larder overhauled the coach education system in rugby league and his work saw the sport in Britain become more professional.

Larder later coached Widnes from 1992 to 1993, Keighley from 1994 to 1996 and Sheffield Eagles in 1997. He was assistant coach to Mal Reilly on the 1988 Great Britain Lions tour, when the Lions won the third test in Sydney, their first test win over Australia since the second test of the 1978 Kangaroo Tour, and remained Great Britain's assistant coach until the end of 1994.

He coached England at the 1995 World Cup, where they defeated Australia in the opening game at Wembley, but ultimately lost the World Cup final to the Kangaroos. Larder was coach of Great Britain on their disastrous 1996 tour of Fiji, Papua New Guinea and New Zealand. The Lions did not win a match in New Zealand, and several players had to return home early to save costs.

=== Rugby union ===
Larder then moved to rugby union, becoming England's defence coach under Clive Woodward in 1997, He also joined Leicester Tigers in 1998, and the team won four consecutive Premiership titles, as well as Heineken Cup victories in 2001 and 2002. With England he won the 2003 Grand Slam and 2003 World Cup. He was awarded an MBE in the 2004 New Year honours.

He then worked as defence coach on the 2001 and 2005 British & Irish Lions tours.

He remained part of the England coaching staff until April 2006, when he was sacked along with Joe Lydon and Dave Alred following the team's poor Six Nations performance. Larder later criticised coach Andy Robinson for letting player power run the team in his 25-month period in charge.

Larder worked with Worcester Warriors as a defensive coach on a part-time basis in 2006-2007 and returned to the club in 2011, before leaving in May 2013.

== Works ==
Larder has written two books on coaching rugby league – The Rugby League Skills Manual, published in 1983 and The Rugby League Coaching Manual, published in 1988.

In 2015, his biography The Iron Curtain: My Rugby Journey from League to Union, written with Nick Bishop, was published.

He has also produced two coaching DVDs – Knock Them Down and Iron Curtain Defence, both released in 2009.
