= Jason Critchley =

England & Wales international rugby league & union footballer

Personal information
- Full name: Jason Roy Critchley
- Born: 7 December 1970 (age 55) St Helens, England

Playing information
- Height: 6 ft 2 in (188 cm)

Rugby league
- Position: Wing, Centre
Club
Years	Team	Pld	T	G	FG	P
1989–92	Widnes	20	2	0	0	8
1992–95	Salford	95	51	0	0	200
1995–97	Keighley Cougars	49	39	0	0	156
1997–98	Castleford Tigers	39	15	0	0	60
1999	Widnes Vikings	11	3	0	0	12
2000	Wakefield Trinity Wildcats	8	4	0	0	16
2001	Whitehaven	6	0	0	0	0
	Total	228	114	0	0	452
Representative
Years	Team	Pld	T	G	FG	P
1992	England	1	0	0	0	0
1996–01	Wales	8	2	0	0	8

Rugby union
Club
Years	Team	Pld	T	G	FG	P
1998–99	Newport	8	3	0	0	15
1999–00	Leicester Tigers	2	0	0	0	0
1999–00 (loan)	→ Manchester	15	6	0	0	30
2000–01	US Dax	14	3	16	0	47
2002–03	De La Salle Palmerston	24	10			50
	Total	63	22	16	0	142

Jason Critchley (born 7 December 1970) is an English former professional rugby league and rugby union footballer who played the 1980s, 1990s and 2000s. At club level for the Castleford Tigers, Keighley Cougars, Salford City Reds, Wakefield Trinity Wildcats, Whitehaven and the Widnes Vikings as a wing or centre, and top level club level rugby union for Newport RFC, Leicester Tigers, Manchester (loan), US Dax and De La Salle Palmerston.

He played representative rugby league for Great Britain at every age level from under 16's, 19's and 21's. He was also selected for England, Wales and Great Britain on the tour to Papua New Guinea, Fiji and New Zealand in 1996.

== Personal Information ==
Critchley was born in St Helens, Lancashire, England.

== Playing career ==
=== Club career ===
Critchley signed for Widnes Vikings from junior club Blackbrook in August 1989. In 1992, he was sold to Salford as part of an exchange deal for Adrian Hadley. Critchley was Salford's top try scorer in the 1993–94 season with 25 tries.

Critchley joined Keighley Cougars in 1995. In August 1996, he scored six tries for Keighley Cougars in a match against Widnes Vikings, breaking a club record which had stood for 90 years for most tries in a single match.

In May 1997, Critchley was signed by Castleford Tigers in exchange for Adrian Flynn and an undisclosed transfer fee. Castleford were bottom of the Super League, and hadn't won a single game when Critchley first arrived at the club, but he helped the club improve results during the rest of the season, and finished as the club's top try scorer.

In 1998, Critchley switched codes and joined rugby union side Newport. He returned to league during the rugby union off-season to play for Wakefield Trinity in 2000.

=== International career ===
Critchley was selected for the 1996 Great Britain Lions tour, but did not play in any Test matches.

Following the relaxation of eligibility rules, Critchley qualified to play for Wales. He was selected in the 40-man training squad for the 1995 Rugby League World Cup, but did not make the final squad. He made his debut a year later, and went on to win eight caps for Wales between 1996 and 2001. He was selected by Wales for the 2000 Rugby League World Cup, making five appearances during the tournament, and scoring a try in Wales' 22–8 win in the quarter final against Papua New Guinea.
