= Ryan Bailey (rugby league) =

Former Great Britain and England international and rugby league footballer

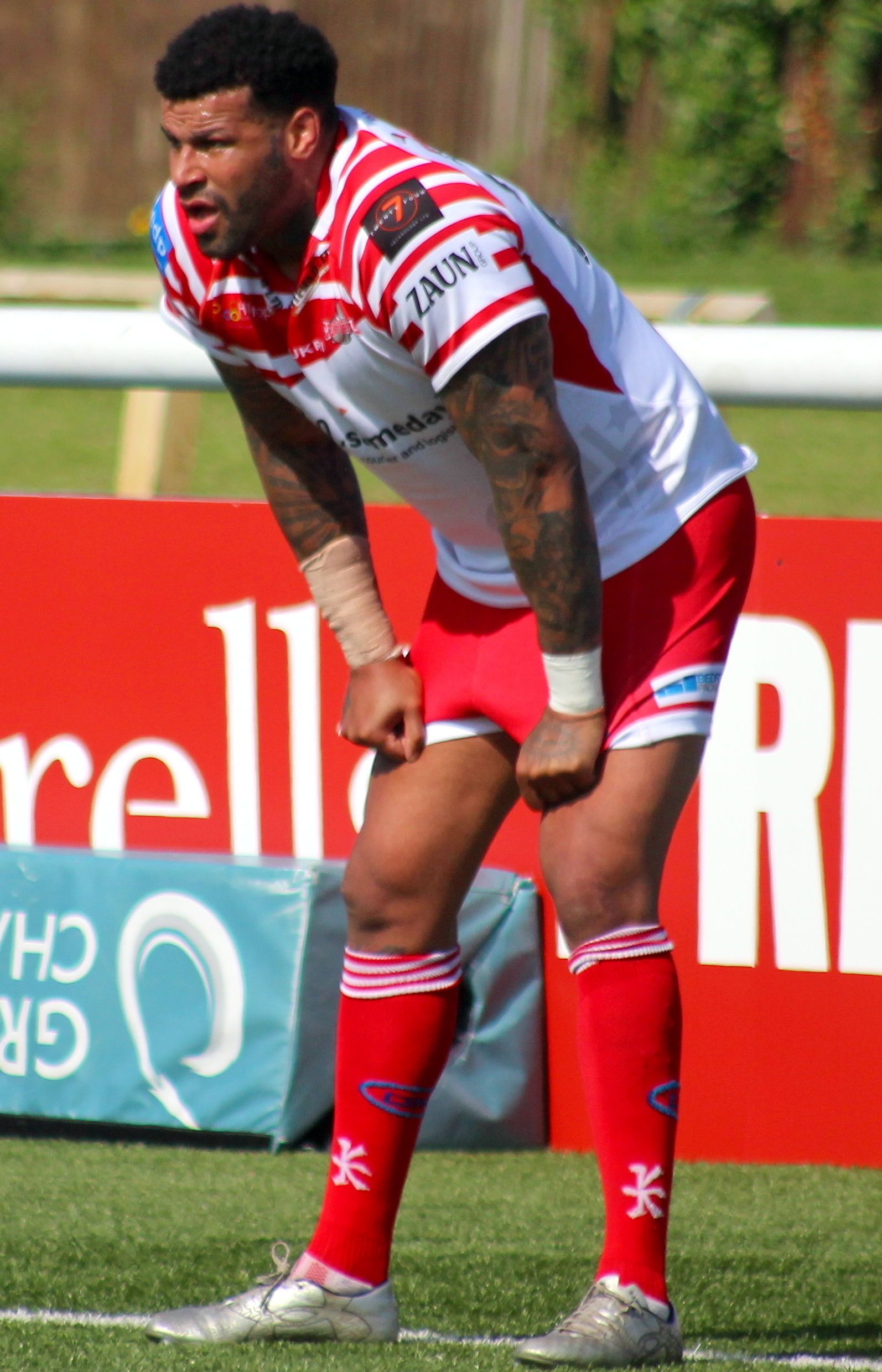

Personal information
- Born: 11 November 1983 (age 42) Leeds, West Yorkshire, England

Playing information
- Height: 6 ft 6 in (1.98 m)
- Weight: 17 st 2 lb (109 kg)
- Position: Prop
Club
Years	Team	Pld	T	G	FG	P
2002–14	Leeds Rhinos	313	20	0	0	80
2002(loan)	→Gateshead Thunder	2	0	0	0	0
2014(dr)	→Hunslet Hawks	1	0	0	0	0
2015	Hull Kingston Rovers	1	1	0	0	4
2015	Castleford Tigers	6	0	0	0	0
2016	Warrington Wolves	15	0	0	0	0
2017	Toronto Wolfpack	8	2	0	0	8
2018	Workington Town	6	1	0	0	4
2018	Leigh Centurions	11	1	0	0	4
	Total	363	25	0	0	100
Representative
Years	Team	Pld	T	G	FG	P
2003	Yorkshire	1	0	0	0	0
2004	Great Britain	4	0	0	0	0
2006	England	4	0	0	0	0

Ryan Bailey (born 11 November 1983) is an English former rugby league footballer who played as a prop. A Great Britain and England international and Yorkshire representative, he played the majority of his club career at the Leeds Rhinos, making over 300 appearances and winning six Super League championships and three World Club Challenges with the club. After leaving Leeds, Bailey played for Hull Kingston Rovers, Castleford Tigers and the Warrington Wolves. After Super League his playing career continued in League 1 with a Canadian club, Toronto Wolfpack, and then at Workington Town. He then went to Leigh Centurions in the Championship.

== Background ==
Bailey was born in Leeds, West Yorkshire, England. His father is of West Indian heritage.

== Playing career ==
=== Leeds Rhinos ===
Bailey made his Super League début for Leeds in 2002 at age 18.

Bailey played for the Leeds Rhinos as a prop in their 2004 Super League Grand Final victory against the Bradford Bulls. He was then selected in the Great Britain team to compete in the end of season 2004 Rugby League Tri-Nations tournament. In the final against Australia Bailey played from the interchange bench in the Lions' 44–4 loss.

As Super League IX champions, the Leeds club faced 2004 NRL season premiers, the Canterbury-Bankstown Bulldogs in the 2005 World Club Challenge. Bailey played as a prop in Leeds' 39–32 victory. He played for Leeds in the 2005 Challenge Cup Final as a prop in their loss against Hull FC. Bailey played for the Leeds club as a prop in their 2005 Super League Grand Final loss against Bradford. Bailey played in the 2008 Super League Grand Final victory over St Helens.

Bailey played in the 2009 Super League Grand Final victory over St. Helens at Old Trafford. Bailey played in the 2010 Challenge Cup Final defeat by Warrington at Wembley Stadium. Bailey played from the interchange bench for Leeds in the 2011 Challenge Cup Final defeat by the Wigan at Wembley Stadium.

Bailey played in the 2011 Super League Grand Final victory over St. Helens at Old Trafford.

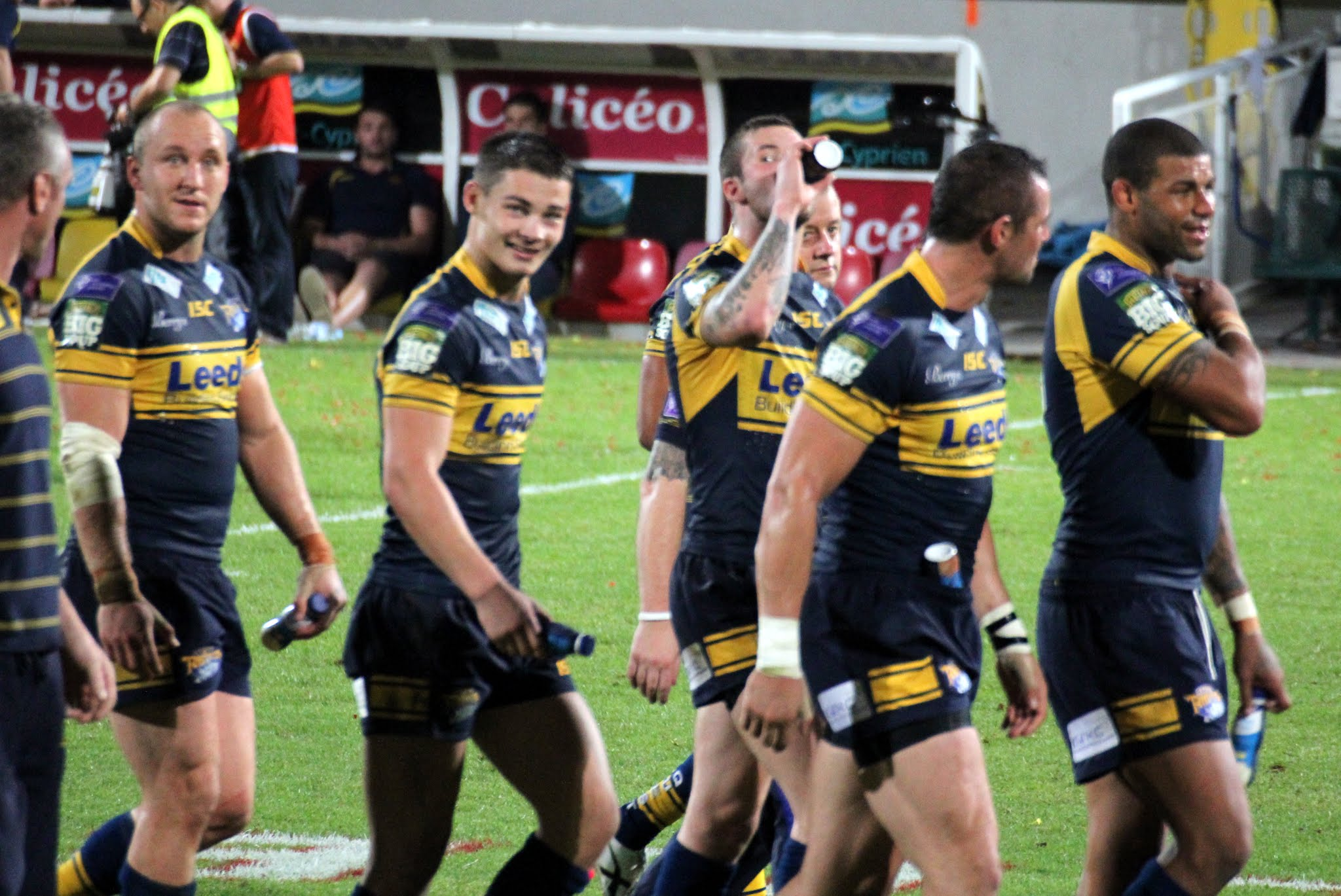
Bailey (pictured right) playing for the Leeds Rhinos in 2012.

Bailey played in the 2012 Challenge Cup Final defeat by Warrington at Wembley Stadium.

Bailey played in the 2012 Super League Grand Final victory over Warringtonat Old Trafford. In 2014, Leeds held a testimonial game for Bailey against London Broncos. On 8 May 2014, he made his 300th career appearance for the Leeds club. Bailey played in the 2014 Challenge Cup Final victory over the Castleford Tigers at Wembley Stadium.

=== Hull KR ===
In 2015 Bailey moved to Hull Kingston Rovers. He was not fit enough to play his former club Leeds in the opening game of the season but went on to score on his début the week after. In March it was announced Bailey had been released because of personal issues after only playing one game for the club.

=== Castleford Tigers ===
A month later he joined the Castleford Tigers for the remainder of the season where he rejoined former coach Daryl Powell. He played six games and scored one try before being released at the end of the season.

=== Warrington Wolves ===
In November 2015 Warrington announced the signing of Bailey on a one-year contract for the 2016 season. There, he would play under Tony Smith again with whom he won two Grand Finals with at Leeds. Bailey publicly opened up about his struggle with depression in 2016. He played in the 2016 Challenge Cup Final defeat by Hull F.C. at Wembley Stadium. He played in the 2016 Super League Grand Final defeat by Wigan at Old Trafford.

=== Toronto Wolfpack ===
Ahead of the 2017 season, Bailey signed for newcomers to Rugby League Toronto. He made his début for the new club in an 80-0 victory over North Wales Crusaders. He then went on to play in seven more games that year and helped in securing the Wolfpack's Kingston Press League 1 triumph and subsequent promotion to the Betfred Championship. On 18 January 2018, it was reported that Bailey, along with teammates Fuifui Moimoi and David Taylor, parted ways with the club by "mutual agreement" following a preseason training camp in Portugal. It was later reported that the players had twice missed curfew during the trip.

=== Workington Town ===
After his departure from Toronto, Bailey joined league 1 side Workington in January 2018. After playing just six games for the Cumbrian team, Bailey was offered a chance to move up to the Championship to play for Leigh and left Workington in April 2018.

=== Leigh Centurions and retirement ===
Bailey joined Leigh in April 2018 and made 11 appearances for the club in the 2018 season. In November 2018, Bailey joined Featherstone Rovers on a trial contract but decided to retire from the game in February 2019 aged 35.

== Controversies ==
In July 2003, he was found guilty of brawling in the street in Leeds, and was sent to a young offender institution for nine months.

Bailey played for the Leeds Rhinos as a prop in their 2004 Super League Grand Final victory against the Bradford Bulls. He was then selected in the Great Britain team to compete in the end of season 2004 Rugby League Tri-Nations tournament. In the final against Australia Bailey played from the interchange bench in the Lions' 44–4 loss. On 23 December 2004 the Rugby Football League fined Bailey along with Leeds' teammate Keith Senior £1,500 each after they tested positive to the banned stimulant ephedrine.

Bailey was charged with "evading, refusing or failing to submit to sample collection" during a routine drug testing session at Toronto's Lamport Stadium on 30 May 2017. An arbitration panel appointed by the UK National Anti-Doping Panel concluded that Bailey had committed an anti-doping rule violation, but that the exceptional circumstances of the case were such that there was no fault or negligence to be apportioned to Bailey and therefore no suspension under the anti-doping rules should be applied. The panel heard evidence, including psychiatric evidence, over three days and heard that Bailey had during the testing process, developed a genuine, if unjustified, belief that the water offered to him by the testing officials was contaminated in some way. The panel also noted that Bailey did take a drugs test three days after the original incident that was negative and stressed that they did not consider Bailey a cheat or someone trying to cover up drug taking. The case is believed to be the first case where a player who has refused to take a test has not been punished.

== Honours ==
Leeds Rhinos

- Super League:

Winner (6): 2004, 2007, 2008, 2009, 2011, 2012
Runner up (1): 2005

- Challenge Cup:

Winner (1): 2014
Runner up (1): 2005, 2010, 2011, 2012

Warrington Wolves

- Super League:

Runner up (1): 2016

- Challenge Cup:

Runner up (1): 2016

Toronto Wolfpack

- League 1:

Winner (1): 2017
