= Victoria Bateman =

British economist

- Born: Victoria Naomi Powell; 1979 (age 46–47); Tameside, England
- Occupations: Academic, economist
- Spouse: James Bateman

Academic background
- Education: Saddleworth School; Oldham Sixth Form College; University of Cambridge (B.A.); University of Oxford (M.Sc., D.Phil.)

Academic work
- Discipline: Economic history Feminist economics Gender inequality
- Institutions: Gonville and Caius College, Cambridge
- Main interests: British economic history, macroeconomics, feminism
- Website: www.vnbateman.com

Victoria Naomi Bateman (née Powell, born 1979) is a British feminist economist and academic, specialising in economic history. She is a fellow in economics at Gonville and Caius College, Cambridge. She is Director of Studies for the Economics Tripos at Gonville and Caius College.

Brought up in Lees, Greater Manchester, Bateman attended Saddleworth School, Uppermill. She then studied for A-levels at Oldham Sixth Form College where she was President of the Student Union. She read economics at Gonville and Caius College, Cambridge, and went on to receive master's and doctoral degrees from the University of Oxford.

Her research focuses on economic history, including the role of markets in economic development, and the role of women's rights and freedoms in stimulating economic growth.

She is well known for her public protests against Brexit and in favour of women's rights, occasionally appearing naked.

== Early life ==
Bateman grew up with two younger sisters in Lees, Greater Manchester. Her father worked in the sheet metal industry, installing ductwork; her mother worked for the same company in the payroll department. When both parents lost their jobs, her father started a new business of his own, which foundered when clients were unable to pay. Her mother worked several jobs, and the family struggled to pay its debts. Bateman's parents divorced when she was 14 years old, and their economic straits worsened. Her sisters dropped out of school, and one became pregnant as a teenager. Bateman attributes her interest in economics to witnessing first-hand the effects of the boom-bust cycle and economic disparity. With the encouragement of her father and a history teacher, she studied economics at Cambridge as an undergraduate, followed by master's degrees in economics and economic history and a doctoral degree in economics at Oxford.

== Research ==
Bateman's academic research focuses on economic history. Her 2019 book The Sex Factor: How Women Made the West Rich argues that women's rights and freedoms were a key factor enabling the industrial and economic development of the West, by boosting wages, skills, saving and entrepreneurial spirit, and helping to produce a democratic and capable state.

Her earlier work focused on the role of markets in economic development in Europe. Her paper The evolution of markets in early modern Europe, 1350–1800: a study of wheat prices uses data on European wheat prices to study trends in market development from the early medieval period to the industrial revolution, demonstrating that markets were as well-integrated across Europe in the early 16th century as they were in the late 19th century. Her book Markets and growth in early modern Europe builds on this research, examining several aspects of the relationship between market integration and economic development.

== Feminism and protest ==
Bateman identifies as a feminist, and writes: "I believe passionately in freedom for women, and whilst many battles have been won in the past century, there is still a long way for society to move until women enjoy the levels of freedom that they should be able to. I am not afraid to use my body as well as my brain to deliver important messages."

In 2014, Bateman commissioned and posed nude for a life-size portrait by Anthony Connolly, which subsequently appeared in the Mall Galleries. Bateman said that the purpose of the painting was to ask questions about the sexualisation of women in modern society. In June 2018, Bateman attended the Gonville and Caius College end of term supervisor dinner wearing a see through body suit, with the words "my body my choice" written on her body. Bateman is an advocate of the recognition by economists of the economic value of the sex trade and the right of women to earn their living by prostitution. In July 2018, Bateman posted a video on Twitter in which she appeared naked and discussed inequality in economics.

== Brexit and protest ==
Bateman is a frequent critic of Brexit, arguing that "Brexit leaves Britain naked", and that leaving the EU would hurt low-income families, damage British scientific research, would reduce trade and investment, and would place freedom for the nation state ahead of freedom for the individual.

Following the pro-Brexit referendum of 23 June 2016, Bateman attended a Cambridge University Faculty of Economics meeting naked, as a protest against Brexit. She had the words "Brexit leaves Britain naked" written across her torso. On 14 January 2019, Bateman delivered an hour-long lecture against Brexit at the Cambridge Junction while naked, then asked the audience to sign her body as a petition. She was subsequently invited to appear on the Today programme on BBC Radio 4, in which she also stripped naked. This led to a naked appearance on Good Morning Britain, although her body was pixelated before broadcast. She similarly appeared naked at the March 2018 meeting of the Royal Economic Society.

== Media ==
Bateman has written regular economics commentary for Unherd, Bloomberg View and CapX, has contributed articles to The Guardian, Times Higher Education, The Conversation and The Telegraph and has appeared on a number of BBC Radio 4 programmes.

== Personal life ==
Bateman is married to James Bateman, who works for an asset management company. They met at Cambridge University.

== Books ==
- Bateman, Victoria (2016). Markets and Growth in Early Modern Europe. Routledge
- Bateman, Victoria (2019). The Sex Factor: How Women Made the West Rich. Polity.
- Bateman, Victoria (2023) Naked Feminism: Breaking the Cult of Female Modesty, Wiley.
- Bateman, Victoria (2025) Economica: A Global History of Women, Wealth, and Power, ISBN 978-1541606067
