= Glen Black =

New Zealand rugby league referee

Refereeing information
Years	Competition	Apps
2004–2005	Super League	6
2004–2005	Tri Nations	3
2005	Other Internationals	1
- Source: RLP

Glen Black is a New Zealand former rugby league referee. An international referee, Black has also controlled Canterbury Rugby League, New Zealand Rugby League and Super League matches.

== International career ==
Black was the New Zealand Rugby League's nomination in both the 2004 and 2005 Tri-Nations. Before each of these tournaments Black controlled several matches in the Super League competition.

In 2004 his appointment to the Australia v Great Britain match was initially criticised by Australian coach Wayne Bennett, however after the match Bennett was happy with Blacks performance and said he would be happy to have him control them again.

He was named the New Zealand Rugby League's 2004 Referee of the year.
