= Nathan Cayless =

New Zealand international rugby league footballer and coach

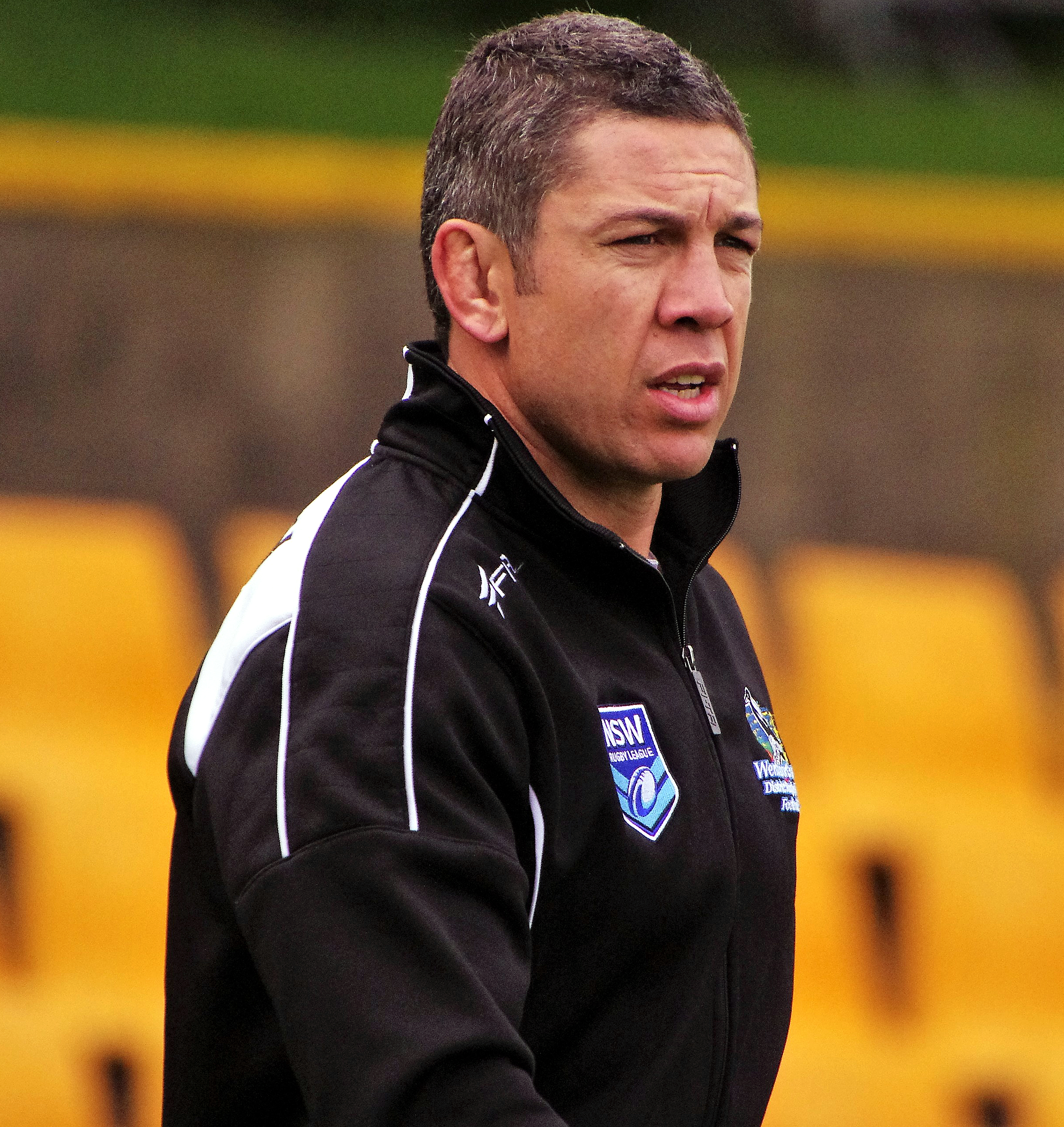

Personal information
- Full name: Nathan Frederick Cayless
- Born: 28 March 1978 (age 48) Sydney, New South Wales, Australia
- Height: 185 cm (6 ft 1 in)
- Weight: 106 kg (16 st 10 lb)

Playing information
- Position: Prop, Second-row
Club
Years	Team	Pld	T	G	FG	P
1997–10	Parramatta Eels	259	28	0	1	113
Representative
Years	Team	Pld	T	G	FG	P
1998–08	New Zealand	39	3	0	0	12

Coaching information
Club
Years	Team	Gms	W	D	L	W%
2017–18	Wentworthville Magpies NSW Cup	44	18	0	26	41
2023–26	Parramatta Eels NSW Cup	96	43	4	49	45
2027–	Hull Kingston Rovers	0	0	0	0
	Total	140	61	4	75	44
- Source: As of 22 November 2026
- Education: Parramatta Marist High School
- Relatives: Jason Cayless (brother)

Nathan Frederick Cayless (born 28 March 1978) is a professional rugby league coach who is the head coach of Hull Kingston Rovers in the Super League and a former professional rugby league footballer who played in the 1990s, 2000s and 2010s.

He played at international level for New Zealand (captain), and at club level in the National Rugby League (NRL) for the Parramatta Eels, for whom he was a long-time captain, as a prop. He captained the New Zealand national team to a Rugby League World Cup victory over Australia in the 2008 Rugby League World Cup, and coached at club level in the Intrust Super Premiership for the Wentworthville Magpies from 2016 to 2018.

== Background ==
Cayless was born in Sydney, New South Wales, Australia, he has Maori heritage, and eligible to play for New Zealand due to the grandparent rule, and he is the older brother of the former rugby league footballer, Jason Cayless.

While attending Parramatta Marist High School, Nathan played for the Australian Schoolboys team in 1995 and 1996. However, he later chose to represent New Zealand at senior level.

== Playing career ==
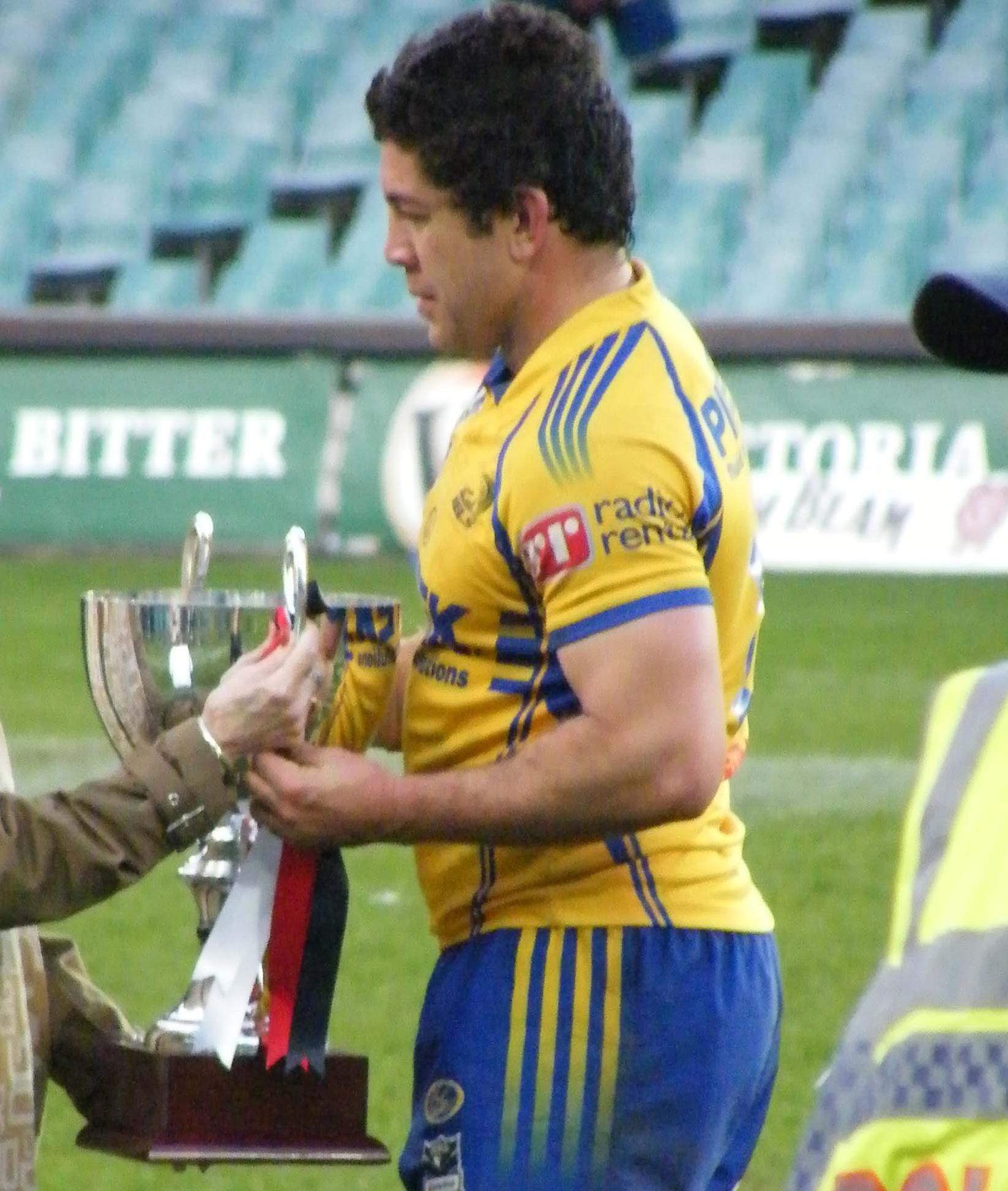
Cayless representing Parramatta

=== Parramatta Eels ===
Cayless made his first grade debut for Parramatta in round 13 of the 1997 ARL season against the South Queensland Crushers which ended in a 52–10 victory at Parramatta Stadium. In the 1998 NRL season, Cayless made 19 appearances as Parramatta reached the preliminary final but were defeated 32-20 by rivals Canterbury-Bankstown in extra-time after leading the game 18–2 with less than 10 minutes to play.

The following year, Cayless played in the club's 18–16 loss against eventual premiers Melbourne in the preliminary final after leading 16–0 at half time. In the 2000 NRL season, Parramatta again reached the preliminary final but were defeated by the Brisbane Broncos 16–10 at Stadium Australia.

In the 2001 NRL season, Cayless captained the Parramatta side to the Minor Premiership where they set numerous records throughout the year. Cayless captained Parramatta in the 2001 NRL Grand Final against Newcastle where the club were favorites to take out their first premiership since 1986 but suffered a 30–24 loss with Newcastle racing out to a 24–0 lead at half time.

In the 2005 NRL season, Cayless captained Parramatta to their second minor premiership in five years and were favorites along with St. George to take out the title but suffered a 29–0 loss to North Queensland in the preliminary final at Telstra Stadium.

In the 2009 NRL season, Cayless played nearly every game as Parramatta went on a remarkable run to reach the 2009 NRL Grand Final against Melbourne. Parramatta lost the final 23–16 at ANZ Stadium, but Melbourne's premiership win was stripped the following year due to multiple and deliberate breaches of the salary cap.

With Parramatta, he holds the record for the most games as captain of any team in the NRL. Cayless was never a prolific try-scorer; the most he ever scored in a season was 5. He also endured a scoring drought spanning over 80 games in his last several NRL seasons. In the final game of his career, Cayless finally brought the drought to an end, touching down in front of his home crowd. He also kicked a Field Goal in 2008 against the Newcastle Knights to send the match into extra time. Luke Burt then kicked the winning Field Goal. In 2014, Cayless was inducted into the Parramatta Eels hall of fame.

=== New Zealand ===
Cayless was selected for the New Zealand team to compete in the end of season 1999 Rugby League Tri-Nations tournament. In the final against Australia he played from the interchange bench in the Kiwis' 22–20 loss. Cayless was part of the Kiwis squad for the 2000 Rugby League World Cup, in which they reached the final.

Cayless was selected to play for the New Zealand national team as a prop forward in the 2007 ANZAC Test loss against Australia.

Cayless captained New Zealand to victory in the 2008 Rugby League World Cup. Cayless became one of the New Zealand national rugby league team' most-capped players, having appeared on 38 occasions by April 2009 when he retired from international rugby league, stating that he wanted to focus the rest of his football career on the Eels.

== Coaching career ==
In 2016, Cayless became the head coach of Intrust Super Premiership NSW side the Wentworthville Magpies. Cayless spent two years at the club but failed to make the finals on both occasions. On 1 October 2018, Cayless signed a two-year deal to become the new head coach of the New Zealand Warriors reserve grade side.

On 23 June 2026, it was announced that Cayliss had signed a three-year contract with Hull Kingston Rovers to succeed Willie Peters as head coach following the conclusion of the 2026 season.

=== Highlights ===
- Junior Club: Wentworthville Magpies
- Career Stats: 259 career games to date scoring 28 tries, 1 Field Goal
- National: 38 tests for New Zealand. World Cup winning captain 2008.
- Most capped Captain in the NRL: 217 Games captained.
- Minor Premiership winner with Parramatta in 2001 and 2005.
