= Ben Biri =

PNG international rugby league footballer

Personal information
- Born: Papua New Guinea
- Weight: 115 kg (18 st 2 lb)

Playing information
- Position: Prop
Representative
Years	Team	Pld	T	G	FG	P
1992–96	Papua New Guinea	10	2	0	0	8

Ben Biri is a Papua New Guinean former professional rugby league footballer who represented Papua New Guinea at the 1995 World Cup.

== Playing career ==
Biri played prop, weighing in at 18 stone. He first represented Papua New Guinea in 1992 before playing in the 1995 World Cup and again in 1996 against the touring Great Britain Lions.
