= Jason Cayless =

NZ international rugby league footballer

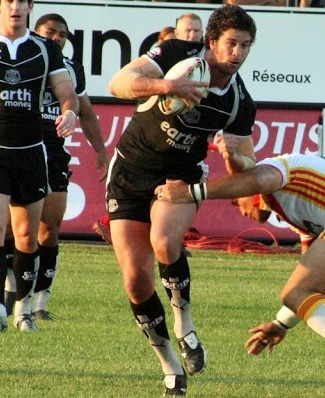

Personal information
- Full name: Jason Paul Cayless
- Born: 15 January 1980 (age 46) Sydney, New South Wales, Australia

Playing information
- Height: 194 cm (6 ft 4 in)
- Weight: 108 kg (17 st 0 lb)
- Position: Prop
Club
Years	Team	Pld	T	G	FG	P
2000–01	Parramatta Eels	24	0	0	0	0
2002–05	Sydney Roosters	83	4	0	0	16
2006–09	St Helens	71	7	0	0	28
2010	Wests Tigers	3	0	0	0	0
	Total	181	11	0	0	44
Representative
Years	Team	Pld	T	G	FG	P
2001	City Origin	1	0	0	0	0
2002–06	New Zealand	10	0	0	0	0
- Relatives: Nathan Cayless (brother)

Jason Paul Cayless (born 15 January 1980) is a former New Zealand international rugby league footballer who played as a prop in the 2000s and 2010s. He played for the Parramatta Eels, Sydney Roosters and the Wests Tigers in the NRL and St Helens in the Super League.

He won the 2002 Telstra Premiership and the 2003 World Club Challenge with the Roosters, and the 2006 Challenge Cup, 2006 Super League Grand Final, 2007 Challenge Cup and the 2007 World Club Challenge with the Saints.

== Background ==
Cayless was born in Sydney, New South Wales, Australia. He is of Maori descent. He is the younger brother of Nathan Cayless.

== Club career ==
=== Parramatta Eels ===
Cayless started his career in the National Rugby League with the Parramatta Eels alongside his older brother, Nathan Cayless, who had already been with the club for three years.

In 2001 he made his representative début for New South Wales Country Origin.

=== Sydney Roosters ===
The following year Cayless moved to the Sydney Roosters and played for them at prop forward in their 2002 NRL Grand Final win over the New Zealand Warriors.

Having won the 2002 NRL Premiership, the Roosters traveled to England to play the 2003 World Club Challenge against Super League champions, St Helens. Cayless played at prop forward in Sydney's victory.

He played at prop for the Sydney Roosters in the 2003 NRL grand final which was lost to the Penrith Panthers.

Cayless played for the Roosters at prop forward in their 2004 NRL grand final loss to cross-Sydney rivals, the Bulldogs.

=== St Helens ===
Cayless played for St Helens as a prop forward in their 2006 Challenge Cup Final victory against the Huddersfield Giants.

St Helens reached the 2006 Super League Grand final to be contested against Hull F.C. and Cayless played as a prop forward in Saints' 26–4 victory.

As 2006 Super League champions, St Helens faced 2006 NRL Premiers the Brisbane Broncos in the 2007 World Club Challenge. Cayless played at prop forward in the Saints' 18–14 victory.

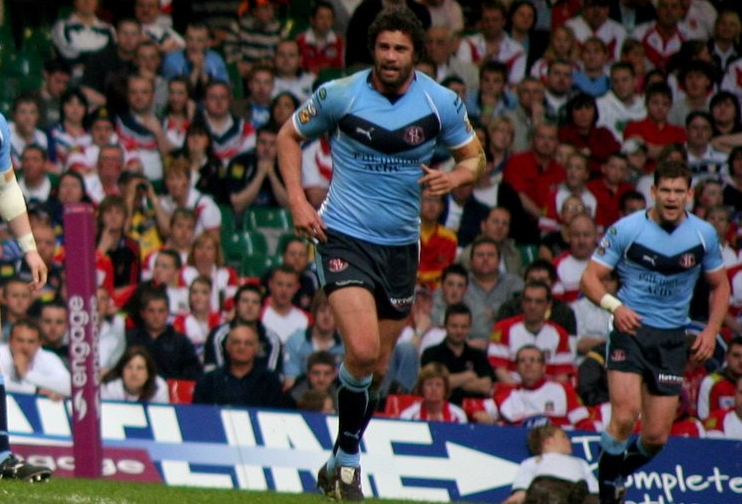
Cayless playing for St Helens in 2008

=== Wests Tigers ===
After spending four seasons in the Super League, in October 2009 Cayless signed with the Wests Tigers on a two-year contract starting in 2010. He started the first three games of the season from the bench, but injuries saw him make no further appearances for the Tigers in 2010. He announced his retirement before the start of the 2011 season.

== International career ==
He made his international début for New Zealand in 2002 and went on to play in ten Test matches for New Zealand.

== Highlights ==
- First Grade Debut: Round 21, Parramatta v Wests Tigers at Parramatta Stadium, 25 June 2000
- National Representation: 11 Tests for New Zealand
- NRL Premiership Winner: 2002 for Sydney Roosters
- Super League Championship Winner: 2006 for St Helens
- Carnegie Challenge Cup Winner: 2006 for St Helens
- World Club Challenge Winner: 2007 for St Helens
