= Louis Anderson =

New Zealand international rugby league footballer

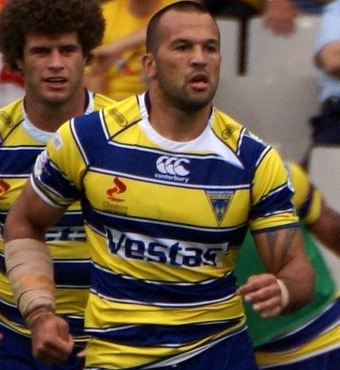

Personal information
- Full name: Louis Manu Anderson
- Born: 27 June 1985 (age 41) Dargaville, New Zealand

Playing information
- Height: 185 cm (6 ft 1 in)
- Weight: 101 kg (15 st 13 lb)
- Position: Second-row, Lock, Prop
Club
Years	Team	Pld	T	G	FG	P
2004–07	New Zealand Warriors	67	7	0	0	28
2008–11	Warrington Wolves	104	24	0	0	104
2012–18	Catalans Dragons	143	35	0	0	140
2019	Villegailhenc-Aragon XIII
	Total	314	66	0	0	272
Representative
Years	Team	Pld	T	G	FG	P
2004–07	New Zealand	18	3	0	0	12
2011	Exiles	1	0	0	0	0
- Relatives: Vinnie Anderson (brother); Fraser Anderson (brother)

Louis Manu "Lui" Anderson (born 27 June 1985) is a New Zealand rugby league footballer who plays for Villegailhenc-Aragon XIII in the Elite Two Championship. A New Zealand former international representative forward, he previously played for the New Zealand Warriors in the National Rugby League competition and for the Catalans Dragons and Warrington Wolves in the Super League.

He is the brother of Vinnie and Fraser Anderson, and is a member of the Church of Jesus Christ of Latter-day Saints.

Anderson played for Warrington in their 2010 Challenge Cup Final victory over the Leeds Rhinos. In 2011, he agreed a 3-year-deal with Catalans Dragons.

== Background ==
Anderson was born in Dargaville, New Zealand.

== Playing career ==
His junior clubs were the East Coast Bays Barracudas in Auckland and the Taniwharau Rugby League Club in Huntly.

He made his first grade début for the New Zealand Warriors against the Penrith Panthers at Ericsson Stadium on 28 March 2004.

Anderson represented the New Zealand national side and played for the Junior Kiwis in 2002 and Captained them in 2003. Anderson was named in the Tonga squad for the 2008 Rugby League World Cup but withdrew due to injury.

He played in the 2009 Challenge Cup Final victory over Huddersfield and went back to back in the 2010 Challenge Cup Final victory over the Leeds Rhinos at Wembley Stadium.

Anderson was selected for the Exiles squad for the International Origin match against England at Headingley on 10 June 2011.

== Legacy ==
In 2015, he was named in the second-row in Taniwharau's team of their first 70 years.

== Match Fit ==
Anderson made his debut for "Match Fit: Union vs. League" in 2024. He made his debut with Paul Whatuira and Carlos Spencer in Match Fit: Union vs. League. Despite having a lower metabolic age than his biological age, it was revealed that both he and Spencer have a family history of high blood cholesterol despite having lower metabolic age than biological age and are two of the fittest in the group. He also lacks the enzyme to effectively break down cholesterol. Anderson finished second on the initial bronco test at 5:39, two seconds behind Paul Whatuira. Despite being a good butterfly and freestyle swimmer, he suffered PTSD, panic attacks depression and suicidal thoughts after he and his two teenage nieces almost drowned in France after being caught in a rip. At the final weigh-in, while he didn't change in terms of weight, he gained 4kg of muscle while losing 4kg of fat, which meant his metabolic age became the youngest overall at 23, which is a perfect -15 off his biological age.

In the final match, both brothers scored a try. Louis scored the opening try under rugby league rules, while Vinnie scored under rugby union rules.
