= Steve Molloy =

Former GB & England international rugby league footballer

Personal information
- Full name: Stephen John Molloy
- Born: 11 March 1969 (age 56); Gorton, Manchester, England

Playing information
- Position: Prop
Club
Years	Team	Pld	T	G	FG	P
1988–90	Warrington	35+15	0	0	0	0
1990–93	Leeds	66+15	4	0	0	16
1993–97	Featherstone Rovers	128	23	0	0	92
1998–99	Sheffield Eagles	49	3	0	0	12
2000	Oldham	6	1	0	0	4
2000–01	Huddersfield Giants	50	4	0	0	16
2002	Batley Bulldogs	11	4	0	0	16
2002–04	Oldham	80	4	0	1	17
2005	Blackpool Panthers	5	0	0	0	0
	Total	460	43	0	1	173
Representative
Years	Team	Pld	T	G	FG	P
1992–99	England	5	0	0	0	0
1993–96	Great Britain	4	0	0	0	0

Coaching information
Club
Years	Team	Gms	W	D	L	W%
2002–04	Oldham

Stephen John Molloy (born 11 March 1969) is an English former professional rugby league footballer who played in the 1990s and 2000s, and coached in the 2000s. He played at representative level for Great Britain and England, and at club level for Warrington, Leeds, Featherstone Rovers (captain), Sheffield Eagles, Oldham (two spells), Huddersfield-Sheffield Giants, Huddersfield Giants and Batley Bulldogs, as a prop, and coached at club level for Oldham. Steve is the current Head Coach of the ambitious Manchester Rangers RLFC who are currently working on plans to enter the semi-professional & professional ranks in the near future.

== Background ==
Steve Molloy was born in Gorton, Manchester, Lancashire, England.

== Playing career ==
=== Club career ===
Molloy made his début for Warrington on Sunday 28 August 1988, and he played his last match for Warrington on Monday 16 April 1990. He played at prop in Warrington's 24–16 victory over Oldham in the 1989 Lancashire Cup Final during the 1989–90 season at Knowsley Road, St. Helens on Saturday 14 October 1989.

In 1993, Molloy transferred from Leeds to Featherstone Rovers. The transfer fee was decided by a tribunal, with Featherstone paying Leeds an initial fee of £95,000, and an additional £5,000 when he received another cap for Great Britain. He made his début for Featherstone Rovers on Sunday 29 August 1993, and he played his last match for the club in September 1997.

=== International honours ===
Steve Molloy won caps for England while at Leeds in 1992 against Wales, while at Featherstone Rovers in 1996 against France (interchange/substitute), and Wales, while at Sheffield Eagles in 1999 against France (2 matches), and won caps for Great Britain while at Leeds in 1993 against France, while at Featherstone Rovers in 1994 against Fiji, 1996 against Fiji (interchange/substitute), and New Zealand (interchange/substitute).

== Coaching career ==
In 2002, he became player-coach at Oldham. He left the club at the end of the 2004 season when his contract was not renewed.

He spent three seasons coaching Oldham's rugby union team before accepting a development role with the Rugby Football League in 2008.
