= David Bradbury (rugby league) =

Ireland international rugby league footballer

Dave Bradbury
Personal information
- Full name: David Bradbury
- Born: 16 March 1972 (age 53)

Playing information
- Position: Prop, Second-row, Loose forward
Club
Years	Team	Pld	T	G	FG	P
1991–97	Oldham	91	19	0	0	76
1997–99	Salford City Reds
2000	Huddersfield Giants	23	1	0	0	4
2001–04	Leigh Centurions	102	21	0	0	84
	Total	216	41	0	0	164
Representative
Years	Team	Pld	T	G	FG	P
1999–01	Ireland	3	1	0	0	4

David Bradbury (born 16 March 1972) is a rugby league footballer who played in the 1990s and 2000s. He played at representative level for Great Britain (non-Test matches) and Ireland, and at club level for Oldham, the Salford City Reds, the Huddersfield/Sheffield Giants and the Leigh Centurions, as a prop, second-row, or loose forward.

Bradbury made over 100 appearances for Leigh between 2001 and 2004.

Bradbury was a Great Britain tourist in 1996, and an Ireland international and played at the 2000 Rugby League World Cup.
