= Adrian Morley =

GB & England international rugby league footballer

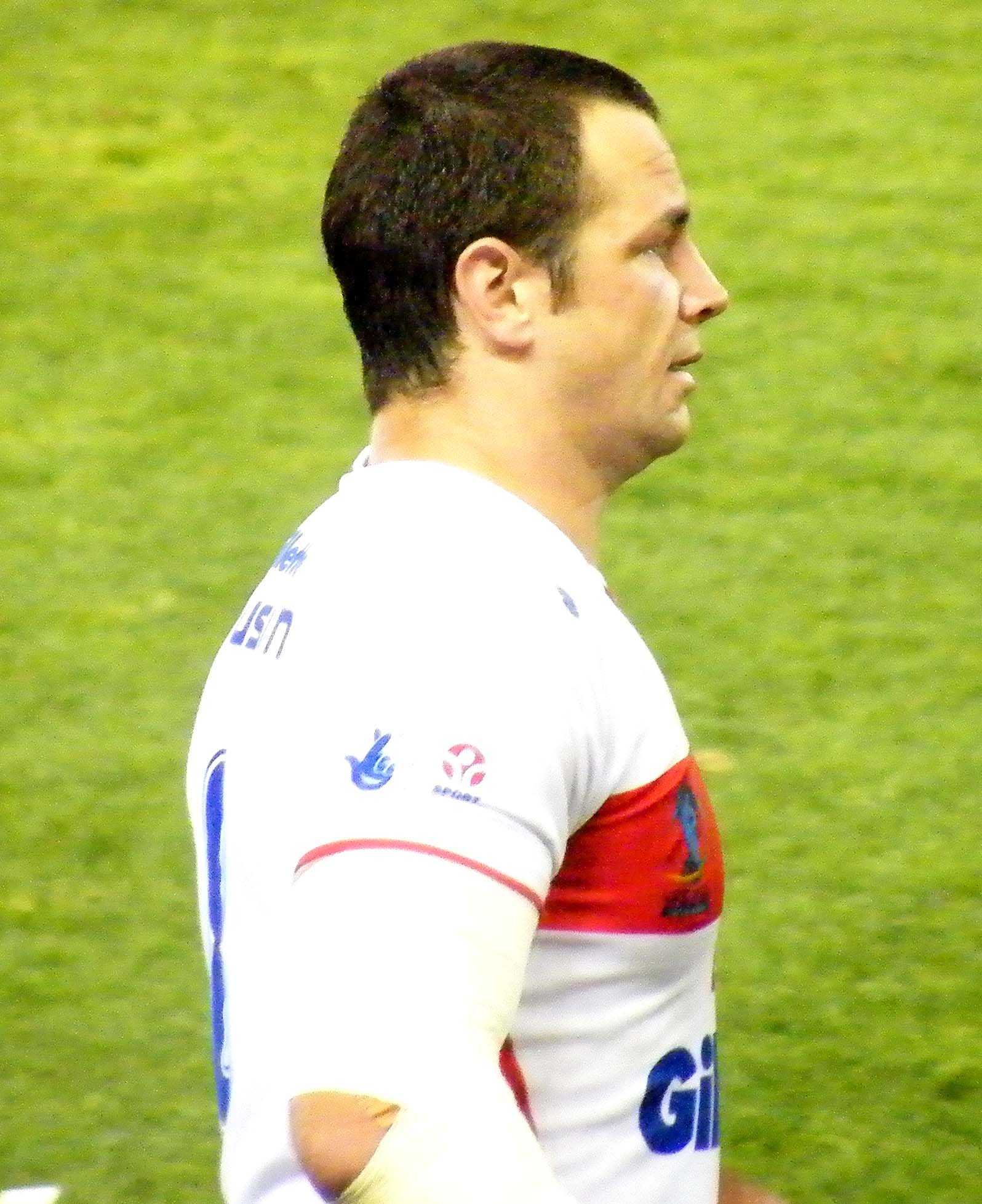

Personal information
- Full name: Adrian Paul Morley
- Born: 10 May 1977 (age 49) Salford, Greater Manchester, England

Playing information
- Height: 6 ft 2 in (1.89 m)
- Weight: 16 st 7 lb (105 kg)
- Position: Prop, Second-row
Club
| Years | Team | Pld | T | G | FG | P |
|---|---|---|---|---|---|---|
| 1995–00 | Leeds Rhinos | 149 | 35 | 0 | 0 | 140 |
| 2001–06 | Sydney Roosters | 114 | 8 | 0 | 0 | 32 |
| 2005(loan) | → Bradford Bulls | 6 | 0 | 0 | 0 | 0 |
| 2007–13 | Warrington Wolves | 173 | 9 | 0 | 0 | 36 |
| 2013(loan) | → Swinton Lions | 1 | 0 | 0 | 0 | 0 |
| 2014–15 | Salford Red Devils | 54 | 2 | 0 | 0 | 8 |
| | Total | 497 | 54 | 0 | 0 | 216 |
Representative
| Years | Team | Pld | T | G | FG | P |
| 1996–07 | Great Britain | 30 | 3 | 0 | 0 | 12 |
| 2000–12 | England | 23 | 1 | 0 | 0 | 4 |
- Relatives: Chris Morley (brother)

Adrian Paul Morley (born 10 May 1977) is an English former professional rugby league footballer who played as a prop or second-row forward. With a reputation as a tough, uncompromising competitor, Morley was the first British player to become a Grand Final winner in both the National Rugby League (NRL) and Super League.

Morley's professional career began with Leeds in 1995, with whom he won the Challenge Cup in 1999. He then played six seasons with Australian club Sydney Roosters, winning the 2002 NRL Premiership and 2003 World Club Challenge, returning to England for a brief spell with Bradford Bulls, with whom he won the Super League Grand Final in 2005. In 2007, he signed for Warrington Wolves, winning three more Challenge Cups, before finishing his career with his hometown club, the Salford Red Devils, where he retired in 2015.

At international level, Morley made his debut in 1996, and went on to represent Great Britain in the 1996 Lions tour, and England at the Rugby League World Cup in 2000 and 2008. He earned over 50 caps during his career (30 for Great Britain and 23 for England), and was awarded a golden cap in recognition of this feat. In 2022, he was inducted into the Rugby League Hall of Fame.

== Club career ==
=== Leeds ===
Born in Salford, Morley played junior rugby league for Eccles ARLFC before signing for Leeds. He made his first team debut for Leeds in April 1995 in a 44–19 win against Hull. Morley played for Leeds as a second-row in their 1998 Super League Grand Final loss to Wigan. He won the Challenge Cup with Leeds in 1999 when they defeated London Broncos 52–16 at Wembley.

=== Sydney ===
In July 2000, Morley agreed to join Australian side Sydney Roosters in the National Rugby League at the end of the season, who were being coached by former Leeds boss Graham Murray.

In 2002, he helped the Roosters win their first title for 27 years, playing in the 2002 NRL Grand Final victory against New Zealand Warriors.

In 2004, he became the first English player to appear in three Australian Grand Finals.

In 2005, he briefly returned to England, signing a short-term deal with Bradford Bulls, and helping them defeat his former club Leeds Rhinos in the 2005 Super League Grand Final.

In July 2006, he played his final game for the Roosters against Canterbury Bulldogs, receiving a seven-match ban for kneeing Corey Hughes, which meant he could not play for the club again for the rest of the season.

=== Warrington ===
In June 2006, Morley turned down a contract extension with the Roosters, and signed a four-year deal with Warrington Wolves, beginning at the start of the 2007 season. He was also appointed captain of Warrington. It was while playing for Warrington that he made his 400th competitive senior appearance.

Morley guided Warrington to Challenge Cup glory in 2009, beating Huddersfield in the final at Wembley.

Morley captained Warrington in the 2010 Challenge Cup Final victory over the Leeds Rhinos at Wembley Stadium.

In 2012, he played in the 2012 Challenge Cup Final victory over the Leeds Rhinos at Wembley Stadium, and the 2012 Super League Grand Final defeat by the Leeds Rhinos at Old Trafford.

At the start of the 2013 season, Morley suffered a torn bicep, which kept him out of action for about three months. While returning to fitness, he played one game for Swinton Lions on dual registration, helping them defeat North Wales Crusaders in the Northern Rail Cup. At the end of the season, he played his final game for Warrington in the 2013 Super League Grand Final defeat by the Wigan Warriors at Old Trafford.

=== Salford ===
Morley signed a one-year deal for his hometown club Salford for the 2014 season and was appointed the club's captain.

On 10 September 2015, Morley announced that he would retire from playing rugby league at the end of the 2015 season.

On 14 October 2015, it was announced that Morley would play one more rugby league match. In his last match, he represented his début club, Leeds, in a one-off exhibition game against New Zealand.

== International career ==
=== Great Britain ===
Morley made his début for Great Britain in 1996, during the ten-match autumn tour of Fiji, Papua New Guinea and New Zealand. He was an interchange substitute in a 34–8 victory over a Papua New Guinea President's XIII, and again a week later in a 42–16 win over a Fiji President's XIII. Morley started from the bench in the first and third tests of the winless test series against New Zealand, scoring a try in the final test, but got a first start for the Lions in a midweek loss to the New Zealand Maori.

In the 1997 post-season, Morley was selected to play for Great Britain in all three matches of the Super League Test series against Australia.

He was selected to play against Australia in the 2003 Ashes Series. In the first Test, he was sent off 12 seconds into the game after a high tackle on Robbie Kearns. He avoided a suspension and played in the remaining two Tests.

In 2007, he captained Great Britain for their mid-season test against France.

=== England ===
Morley made his senior representative debut for England in the summer of 1996 at the European Championship. He was an interchange substitute in the 73–6 win over France.

He was offered a chance to play alongside his brother Chris Morley, who played for Wales, but chose to commit to England in the 2000 World Cup.

Morley was named in the 24-man England squad for the 2008 Rugby League World Cup, and also played against Wales at the Keepmoat Stadium, Doncaster prior to England's departure. In Group A's first match against Papua New Guinea he played from the interchange bench in England's victory.

He was selected to play for England against France in the one-off test in 2010. Morley was to lead England in the 2010 Four Nations but was ruled out after injuring himself in a warm-up match against the New Zealand Māori rugby league team.

Morley played for England in the 2011 Four Nations. England made the tournament's final and in the final, Morley made his 50th international appearance.

Morley is one of a handful of players in the sport's history who have been capped over 50 times at international level, and was awarded a 'golden cap' in recognition of this achievement.

== Playing style ==
Morley played as either a prop or second-row forward, and was renowned for his hard-hitting style, establishing a reputation as an "enforcer". However, he was often criticised for his poor discipline, particularly during his time in the NRL with Sydney Roosters, where he was suspended six times within two years.

He is generally regarded as one of the best forwards of his generation, and was named in the Rugby League World XIII in 2003. In 2022, he was inducted into the Rugby League Hall of Fame.

== Post-playing career ==
After retiring as a player, he returned to Leeds Rhinos, where he coached the club's Academy team during the 2017 season. He left the club at the end of the season to pursue a career outside of rugby league.

In 2021, he became a trustee of the Salford Red Devils Foundation.

== Personal life ==
In 2004, Morley was convicted for drink-driving.

Morley's autobiography, "Moz", was released on 12 November 2012 and reprinted twice in the run up to Christmas 2012.

Morley's son, Leo, has played for the Salford Red Devils scholarship team.
