= 1997 Paris Saint-Germain season =

- Super League II Rank: 11th
- Play-off result: Premiership Trophy preliminary
- Challenge Cup: Fifth Round
- 1997 record: Wins: 6; draws: 0; losses: 16
- Points scored: For: 362; against: 572

Team information
- Coach: Peter Mulholland (until May); Andy Goodway (May – September)
- Captain: Pierre Chamorin
- Stadium: Stade Sébastien Charléty
- Avg. attendance: 5,510 (Super League)
- Agg. attendance: 60,608
- High attendance: 10,513
- Low attendance: 500

Top scorers
- Tries: Phil Bergman (14)
- Goals: Matt O'Connor (26)
- Points: Matt O'Connor (58)
← 1996

The 1997 Paris Saint-Germain rugby league season was the club's second and final season in the Super League. Although the overhauled squad produced a marginally improved record, the RFL remained dissatisfied with the organization's performance on and off the field, and opted to end its Paris presence at the end of the campaign.

== Off-season ==
For the 1997 season, the club had originally envisioned a 13 million francs budget, but fell short by some 5 million francs. In early January 1997, the team's chances of participating in the Challenge Cup and Super League were pegged by insiders at 5 and 50 percent, respectively, although the club maintained that it would be ready for both.

Super League backer News Ltd. increased its support, securing the team's participation and announcing that it would pay for the players to stay full time in Paris, which was not the case the previous season. However, they still roomed at a sports resort just west of Paris. While coach Mulholland praised the accommodations offered by the Forest Hill leisure group as first rate, many players still resented not being given a proper residence.

To assuage logistical challenges, two RFL executives were embedded at the club for a provisional period of three months. Rob Elstone returned from the previous year, and was joined by another envoy from the league's headquarters, Rebecca Cove. Two of the RFL's top administrators, Maurice Lindsay and Harry Jepson, joined PSG RL's six-man board of directors. In order to strengthen the struggling organization's finances, it was announced that two thirds of its shares would be put on sale, so that undisclosed foreign interests could take a participation. An overhaul of the team's business model was touted, with the need to increase sponsorships and a possible shift to a paid attendance model at the forefront of discussions. In the end, Lindsay claimed to have obtained a commitment from PSG to assist with the rugby league section's marketing and to better showcase it on sister TV channel Canal+. The free ticket policy was kept unchanged, which particularly enraged smaller clubs dependent on Murdoch's payments such as Widnes and Featherstone.

Keighley and Great Britain's Phil Larder had been named as an interested party in the coaching job at the end of the previous season, but the eventual choice was Peter Mulholland of Australia. News Ltd. allocated to the team a number of player contracts it had stockpiled during its war against the ARL. The result was an opening roster consisting of 22 foreign players (21 Australians, one New Zealander), only two of which were present the previous season: Deon Bird and Jason Sands. Several had a connection with Mulholland from his former club the Western Reds. The team had its main training camp in Australia and arrived in France at the end of January, slightly more than one week before its debut in the Challenge Cup.

The club had few French players, with the only nationals holding significant roles being captain Pierre Chamorin, Fabien Devecchi and Pascal Bomati. French international Daniel Divet blamed the club's safe recruiting, believing that it would both hurt homegrown players and alienate Paris' fledgling fan base. According to coaching consultant John Kear, Mulholland did favor Australian players from the onset, which turned off some interested French talents. However, it was also pointed that the French federation, in a stunning about face, had banned players under its jurisdiction from joining PSG until the end of the French club championship (whose winter season overlapped with the beginning of the Super League campaign), further complicating matters. Mulholland vowed to increase the number of nationals to eight after the end of the domestic competition. As a sign of goodwill, the Australasian imports were incited to learn French to better integrate, taking lessons twice a week.

== Super League ==
=== Season highlights ===
Like in the previous season, PSG RL started with a 18–4 win over Sheffield Eagles, this time on away soil. Again, the opening day triumph was short-lived and the team soon embarked on an eight-game losing streak.

French players (Pierre Chamorin and Fabien Devecchi) only made their first playing appearance in Round 5 against St Helens. Even after the end of the French championship, PSG struggled to sign more of them. The club even lost Pascal Bomati to rugby union's CA Brive, which Mulholland—joined by a growing number of pundits—again blamed on a lack of proactivity and support from the French game's establishment. To the frustration of the RFL, several French players also preferred to sign with other Super League clubs than PSG, as they were in a better financial situation. Lindsay encouraged English clubs to at least spare some French prospects, although Salford signee Gilles Gironella mentioned that he had chosen Salford because "Paris Saint-Germain only want[ed] experienced players". PSG did find itself in a dispute with Halifax over one of the Blue Sox' multiple French hopefuls, Jérôme Guisset, but he ended up playing for neither team that season.

Although the team was not helped by a rash of injuries, coach Mulholland was dismissed in early May. Fellow Australian John Monie was approached but proved less than enthusiastic about tackling Paris' challenge. The eventual replacement was Englishman Andy Goodway, who had been approached by the club prior to its inaugural campaign but had ultimately opted to remain at Oldham, from where he had just been let go. Goodway had a francophone wife, which may have helped his decision.

Rampant conflicts at the head of the club boiled over in July 1997, leading to a disruption in the distribution of tickets and causing attendance to fall to alarming levels for the home stand that followed. Embarrassed by off-the-field issues and dead last in the standings at that point, the team against all odds produced its best result yet, overcoming a 14 point deficit in the last thirteen minutes to cap a stunning 30–28 upset of powerhouse Wigan, its first Super League home win of the season.

On 9 and 16 August, the team played two home games in southern cities, one in Narbonne against Halifax, and another in Bayonne against Warrington, which coincided with the Fêtes de Bayonne, a popular tourist attraction. It had been decided in the off-season that the team would relocate two or three games to other markets, as August tends to be a slow business month in the French capital due to many residents spending their holidays in the provinces. Using the team as a touring attraction following the France Rugby League model was actually a goal of founder Jacques Fouroux from its inception.

PSG eventually managed to avoid relegation in its last home game of the season against Oldham, Goodway's former employer. With three wins in its final six games, the team belatedly grew into a respectable force, with the Hull Daily Mail calling it "not too bad given all the difficulties". Nonetheless, it once again finished 11th (out of 12) in the standings, with a weak record of 6 wins in 22 games.

=== Results ===
Date	Opponent	Venue	Score	Tries	Goals	Attendance
16 March 1997	Sheffield Eagles	Away	4–18	Bergman, Sing, Wall	Robinson (3)	4,213
21 March 1997	Leeds	Home	18–28	Keough, Olejnik, Sing	Robinson (3)	10,513
28 March 1997	London Broncos	Away	10–28	Hyde, Olejnik	Wall	5,293
31 March 1997	Salford	Away	26–28	Bergman (3), Bird (2)	Robinson (3)	3,195
5 April 1997	St. Helens	Home	6–44	Chamorin	Wall	8,542
13 April 1997	Oldham	Away	18–19	Lomax, Olejnik, Wall	Robinson (3)	3,396
18 April 1997	Bradford	Home	18–30	Olejnik (2), Robinson, Wall	Wall	9,745
27 April 1997	Warrington	Away	34–37	Martin (2), Olejnik (2), Chamorin,	Robinson (3)	4,576
5 May 1997	Leeds	Away	2–30	n/a	O'Connor	11,023
11 May 1997	Castleford	Away	11–8	Bergman, O'Donnell	Robinson (2), O'Connor	3,098
17 May 1997	Sheffield	Home	16–32	Garcia (2), Carr, McAllister, Pinkey	Aston (6)	6,788
26 May 1997	London Broncos	Home	16–20	Bergman (2), Olejnik	Bird (2)	4,934
30 May 1997	Wigan	Away	30–58	Bird, Eade, Martin	O'Connor (4)	7,541
29 June 1997	Halifax	Away	14–12	Evans, O'Connor	O'Connor (3)	3,903
2 July 1997	Salford	Home	16–24	Bird (2), Evans	O'Connor, Robinson	500
5 July 1997	Castleford	Home	8–20	Evans	O'Connor, Robinson	1,020
12 July 1997	Wigan	Home	30–28	Bergman (2), Eade, Evans, Taylor	O'Connor (3), Robinson (2)	2,560
9 August 1997	Halifax	Home	32–0	Bergman (3), Eade, Evans, Hancock	O'Connor (4)	7,743
16 August 1997	Warrington	Home	10–17	Bird	O'Connor (3)	1,549
22 August 1997	Bradford	Away	0–68	n/a	n/a	17,128
26 August 1997	Oldham	Home	23–12	Evans (2), Eade, O'Donnell	O'Connor (4)	6,714
31 August 1997	St. Helens	Away	14–26	Evans, Taylor	O'Connor (3)	5,652

The dates of the Salford home and away match were switched as Stade Charléty was unavailable on Eastern Monday.

=== Table ===
Pos	Team	Pld	W	D	L	PF	PA	PD	Pts	Relegation
1	Bradford Bulls (C)	22	20	0	2	769	397	+372	40	
2	London Broncos	22	15	3	4	616	418	+198	33	
3	St Helens	22	14	1	7	592	506	+86	29	
4	Wigan	22	14	0	8	683	398	+285	28	
5	Leeds Rhinos	22	13	1	8	544	463	+81	27	
6	Salford Reds	22	11	0	11	428	495	−67	22	
7	Halifax Blue Sox	22	8	2	12	524	549	−25	18	
8	Sheffield Eagles	22	9	0	13	415	574	−159	18	
9	Warrington Wolves	22	8	0	14	437	647	−210	16	
10	Castleford Tigers	22	5	2	15	334	515	−181	12	
11	Paris Saint-Germain	22	6	0	16	362	572	−210	12	
12	Oldham Bears (R)	22	4	1	17	461	631	−170	9	Relegated to Division One

Source: Rugby League Project
Rules for classification: 1) Points; 2) Points difference; 3) Number of points scored;
(C) Champions; (R) Relegated

== Challenge Cup ==
In February, the team made its debut in the Challenge Cup knockout competition (which it had bypassed the previous year), winning against second-tier Batley before bowing out to fellow SL members Salford in the next round. It played both cup games on U.K. ground as Stade Charléty was not yet available (a permanent move out of the venue was considered before it could be secured for the remainder of the season). In both Challenge Cup games, PSG did not field a single French player.

Date	Round	Opponent	Venue	Score	Tries	Goals	Attendance
9 February 1997	4th	Batley	Away	38–4	O'Donnell (2), Bird, Evans, Keough, Olejnik, Peters	Robinson (5)	1,252
23 February 1997	5th	Salford	Away	4–8	n/a	Robinson (2)	5,275

== World Club Championship ==
=== Round robin ===
PSG also took part in the 1997 World Club Championship. It started its campaign on a relative high, leading against Australian side Hunter Mariners before succumbing, then thrashing the team several Paris players used to represent, the Western Reds (24–0). The away part of the schedule proved less flattering, yet the team's lone win was enough to advance to the playoffs, amidst the European clubs' abysmal showing in the event.

Date	Opponent	Venue	Score	Tries	Goals	Attendance
8 June 1997	Hunter	Home	12–28	Bird, Devecchi	O'Connor (2)	3,500
21 June 1997	Western Reds	Home	24–0	Eade (2), Bergman, Bird, Lomax	O'Connor (2)	2,500
27 July 1997	Hunter	Away	0–32	n/a	n/a	2,110
1 August 1997	Western Reds	Away	12–30	Bergman, Martin	O'Connor (2)	5,690

=== Playoffs ===
For its WCC playoff appearance, coach Goodway opted to rest key players to focus on the primary objective of avoiding relegation in the Super League.

Date	Round	Opponent	Venue	Score	Tries	Goals	Attendance
13 August 1997	Prelim.	St. Helens	Away	4–44	Mahony	n/a	3,641

== Premiership Trophy ==
PSG's Premiership Trophy appearance on 7 September 1997 was the team's final fixture. The team's last ever try was scored by Frenchman Fabien Devecchi.

Date	Round	Opponent	Venue	Score	Tries	Goals	Attendance
7 September 1997	Prelim.	Salford	Away	6–48	Devecchi	Hyde	2,045

== Administrative controversy ==
The club's ill-conceived operational plan, which had already seen the hasty departure of founder Jacques Fouroux in season one, devolved into another leadership struggle around May 1997. Increasingly disenchanted with the French federation's perceived lack of commitment to the Super League project, the RFL opted to withdraw several staff members it had dispatched to Paris. Fearing the tarnishing of its brand, umbrella organization PSG Omnisports banned the team from using its name, forcing it to operate as just "Paris Rugby League". The ban was rescinded in late June.

In July, the press became aware of the conflict between PSG RL and brothers Laurent and Nicolas Dabe of promotional agency Évènemenent 1, who had been brought in by Fouroux in the early days of France Rugby League. Claiming unpaid monies and threatening a lawsuit if the team closed up shop, they leaked documents to the French authorities, which showed that a large contingent of its Oceanian players had been contracted in the U.K. to dodge French employer taxes, and stayed in Paris on tourist visas instead. The brothers also asserted that two thirds of PSG RL's shares were in fact owned by the RFL, potentially making it liable in the matter. The RFL strenuously denied that claim, arguing that its two executives sat on the club's board purely as goodwill advisors, and assured the press that it would work with the French federation to clarify any contractual issues. In all, the RFL had to cover £200,000 worth of PSG RL's expenses that season. Maurice Lindsay also accused the Dabes of having acted out of spite, due to mounting criticism of their work on behalf of the team.

== Disbanding ==
In early September 1997, coach Andy Goodway met with French federation officials to discuss a potential return to the team in 1998. His demands focused on better availability of French players and more games played in the rugby heartlands of the south. However, during the Super League's end-of-season meeting, spokesman Peter Rowe acknowledged that "the future of Paris is causing some concern". Maurice Lindsay said that a demotion to the second tier, which he felt would be more in line with the Paris market's short-term prospects, would be considered. A rumor had circulated during the season that the RFL, which had long desired a club in Newcastle, would solve both problems by moving PSG there in 1998. That did not prove to be the case and in early November 1997, it was announced that second tier runners-up Huddersfield had been promoted to Super League, while PSG would be disbanded due to the financial burden it represented for the British clubs and poor interactions with French rugby league authorities. At its worst, the club had been hemorrhaging £50,000 a week. According Lindsay, had it not been for the British clubs' decision, the French federation would have eagerly entered Paris for a third Super League campaign.

== Squad ==
Statistics include appearances and points in the Super League.

No	Player	Apps	Tries	Goals	DGs	Points
1	Dion Bird	21	6	2	0	28
2	Shaun Mahony	5	0	0	0	0
3	Jamie Olejnik	11	8	0	0	32
5	Fabien Devecchi	9	0	0	0	0
6	Jeremy Robinson	13	1	21	0	46
7	Jason Martin	17	3	0	0	12
8	Joe Taylor	14	2	0	0	8
9	David O'Donnell	21	3	0	0	12
10	Tony Priddle	18	3	0	0	12
11	Wayne Sing	19	2	0	0	8
12	Pierre Chamorin	15	2	0	0	8
13	David Lomax	21	1	0	0	4
14	Troy Bellamy	15	0	0	0	0
15	James Durkin	5	0	0	0	0
16	Craig Menkins	9	0	0	0	0
17	Michael Hogue	12	0	0	0	0
18	Anthony Hancock	14	1	0	0	4
19	Phillipe Ricard	1	0	0	0	0
20	Jason Eade	9	4	0	0	12
21	Jason Sands	11	0	0	0	0
22	Paul Evans	18	8	0	0	32
23	Phil Bergman	21	14	0	0	56
24	Alex Couttet	1	0	0	0	0
25	Matt O'Connor	15	1	26	2	58
26	Nicholas Hyde	10	1	0	0	4
27	Adam Peters	19	0	0	0	0
28	Anthony Wall	9	3	3	0	18
29	Didier Cabestany	6	0	0	0	0
30	Abderazak El Halouki	1	0	0	0	0
32	Romain Sort	1	0	0	0	0
33	Jerome Azema	1	0	0	0	0
34	Nicolas Couttet	1	0	0	0	0
	Pascal Jampy	1	0	0	0	0
	Jason Keough	2	1	0	0	4
	Frédéric Teixido	1	0	0	0	0
