= 1996 Paris Saint-Germain season =

- Super League I Rank: 11th
- 1996 record: Wins: 3; draws: 1; losses: 18
- Points scored: For: 398; against: 795

Team information
- CEO: Jacques Fouroux
- Coach: Michel Mazaré
- Captain: Pierre Chamorin
- Stadium: Stade Sébastien Charléty
- Avg. attendance: 8,010
- Agg. attendance: 88,109
- High attendance: 17,873
- Low attendance: 4,050

Top scorers
- Tries: Pascal Bomati (10)
- Goals: Patrick Torreilles (25)
- Points: Patrick Torreilles (54)
1997 →

The 1996 Paris Saint-Germain Rugby League season was the first season of Paris Saint-Germain's rugby league football department. Playing in a newly launched European circuit, the Super League, Paris finished the season in 11th place out of 12 teams, narrowly avoiding relegation.

== Pre-season ==
The Paris team was built on the same model as the regional teams of Fouroux's France Rugby League, albeit on a national scale, with Fouroux billing the capital team as representing the whole country. It was a selects team rather than a full-time operation, with players on loan from the various clubs of the regular French club championship. There was however a caveat. While France Rugby League was a short tour played across the months of August and September, causing no major disruption to the existing French championship, the Super League played a full season from March to September, which meant that the climax of the French championship overlapped with the first months of its schedule. The French clubs were not disposed to grant their players a complete release to PSG, so they had to perform double duty.

Due to the southern location of most teams in the French championship, PSG players trained at a Toulouse sports institute, and would be shuttled back and forth between Toulouse, their French championship club and wherever PSG was playing that week. Most of their time with PSG would actually be spent at a hotel as they had no permanent residence in the French capital. Some of the French championship's import players, while interested by the Super League exposure, were unimpressed by the makeshift nature of the team and the fact that it promised no full-time contracts, only showing up to avoid the four-game suspension that had been promised to them if they did not.

The team was built on short order. Veteran French head coach Michel Mazaré and his assistant Englishman David Ellis were both hired within two weeks of one another in December 1995. Mazaré formed a list of 65 players, including 23 imports, he was interested in. The team's first scouting camp took place on 11 January 1996, less than three months before opening night. The final number present at the camp was 71. Three try-out games were played. 40 players remained for the final of these on January 23, an intrasquad game between domestic players and imports that would decide the core group of 25 players.

During scrimmages, Australian manager Tas Baitieri and the rest of his staff quickly came to the realization that the team would need to be upgraded with external players, at least one or two for a start. However, due to the late preparation, solid league players were scarce and management had to turn to rugby union in the short term. Abdelatif Benazzi, who had played under Fouroux with Team France and the French Barbarians, was briefly mentioned, but was a long shot. The more pragmatic choice was New Zealand forward Darren Adams. Previously with Paris' historic union team, Racing Club de France, he was the only player from the opening night roster who was not drafted from a French league club, and the only true resident of the capital.

At the end of January, the team announced a first batch of 25 signings, consisting of 17 French players (including 12 internationals), plus 9 foreigners (6 Australians, a New Zealander, but also a Moldavian and a Pole). The list was not final, however, and there was a fluctuating contingent of about 10 players on standby outside of the core group. Former RFLer Daniel Divet of Limoux was included, but Baitieri soon clarified that the player was still on the fence about playing, and that the club was trying to convince him to sign at least for the first part of the season. In the end, Divet did not play for PSG. Baitieri also named dual-code player Bernard Lacombe, then with Villeneuve in the French RL Championship, as another likely recruit, but he never dressed for Paris either.

The RFL's Maurice Lindsay was bullish in his support of Paris, announcing that the RFL was ready to step in and allocate additional import players to the team if need be. In March, contacts were made with a pair of Tongans, nines international Kava Utoikamanu and union international Isi Tapueluelu. The hulking Utoikamanu, back in the game after two years in the U.S. to try a boxing career, ended up joining the team shortly after opening night. Players on loan from French league clubs were offered a stipend by the Parisian team for each selection: £600 for a win, and £300 for a loss. A few foreign players had the privilege of a salaried contract signed directly with PSG.

The squad was introduced to PSG fans during the return leg of the association football team's Cup Winners' Cup quarterfinal against Parma at Parc des Princes on 26 March 1996, where they entertained the crowd by performing some skills and kicking some balls into the stands. The team's admitted objective was to finish in 11th place, or just above the final spot synonymous with relegation.

== Season highlights ==
=== Team and Super League debut ===
On 29 March 1996, PSG Rugby League made its Super League debut with a 30–24 victory over Sheffield Eagles at the team's regular venue, Stade Sébastien Charléty. Former Eagle Frédéric Banquet scored the first try in both PSG and Super League history. Patrick Entat, who was widely envisioned as the team's captain, missed a large chunk of training camp, so the title was bestowed upon up-and-comer Pierre Chamorin for opening night. The game, which featured musical performances by rap duo Mellowman and afropop band Toure Kunda, drew 17,873 spectators. Fouroux basked in the early success of its casual fan-oriented approach, relaying the story of the Canal+ hotline being overloaded by thousands of channel subscribers calling in to snag the tickets offered to them for the game. About 3,000 fans traveled from the league hotbeds of southern France to witness the event. Uncharacteristically, some rugby union personalities expressed their support, such as Roger Blachon, chairman of Charléty's usual residents Paris UC, and France international Jean-Baptiste Lafond, who commented: "They dared to do what had to be done, what we should all do. They proved that their sport is a beautiful sport."

The Guardian called the game "an unforgettable victory", while The Daily Telegraph deemed it "a highly encouraging start" for the new loop, and "a victory which, on this evidence, will be the first of many" for PSG. French daily Libération, still circumspect a few days before, summed up: "With an almost full stadium, the Super League has won its first bet in France." RFL honcho Maurice Lindsay rejoiced, saying: "Some reporters came for a funeral and had to write about a party".

=== Season continued ===
However, the rest of the season would not be quite as successful. PSG RL was given a reality check by Wigan Warriors (8–76), the second in a series of 11 consecutive defeats. The club was not helped by scheduling conflicts with the French domestic competitions, which occasionally forced players to miss games outright. Attendance figures decreased as well, although not to the same extent as they would have in a traditional, box office-driven club. In May, the RFL assigned its academy coach John Kear to PSG as a special defense consultant for the rest of the season in hopes of shoring up the team's weaknesses. Kear himself considered that the end of the French league schedule, rather than his intervention, was the biggest contributing factor in the team managing to avoid relegation. As predicted in camp, fatigue had taken its toll on the squad, some of whom ended up playing in the neighborhood of 50 games over the season.

Despite the show of sportsmanship by select union representatives on the team's debut, PSG quickly saw some of its best players courted by the older code, which manager Baitieri decried as an attempt to thwart PSG's takeover of the capital market. Grzegorz "Gregory" Kacała, a Pole who played for Paris by way of Lyon Villeurbanne of the French championship, returned to rugby union in May, soon followed by fellow union renegade Darren Adams. Rising star Pierre Chamorin, a league lifer, also declined several offers to switch allegiance in order to stay with PSG. The club was not sparred by instability at the administrative level either. In May, it was announced that Baitieri was due to leave, having been called back to Australia to work for the ARL. Jacques Fouroux resigned from PSG RL's presidency on 8 June 1996, quickly rejoining his hometown union club Auch. He was succeeded by France Rugby League president Jacques Larrose. The team's instability and questionable business model spurred rumors that it would be relocated to Toulouse the following season.

In one of his last moves before his effective departure in late June, Baitieri obtained a package of five players under contract with Murdoch's Australasian Super League (which was then blocked from operating by a court order), including Ian Russell. July saw further bold moves, as PSG entered talks with two recent Leeds players, Neil Harmon and Phil Hassan, controversially contemplating to sign them without paying any transfer fee, based on an interpretation of the new Bosman ruling. Leeds threatened to sue, and neither suited up for Paris. Later that month, the team signed former London Bronco Justin Bryant and former under-21 union international Jonathan Griffiths, leaving his former club Wakefield blindsided by the news.

The changes produced an improvement in the results, with Wigan's Terry O'Connor calling Paris "a force to be reckoned with" after their narrow late season win on French soil. French rugby league historian Robert Fassolette, however, lamented the fact that it came at the expense of domestic player experience, which was one of the stated goals of the Parisian venture.

PSG finished its inaugural campaign in 11th place out of 12, barely escaping relegation with a meager record of 3 wins and a draw in 22 games. Kear was offered the full time coaching gig at the end of the season, but declined as he did not feel the organization's logistics lent themselves to performance. The club only finished the season thanks to additional contributions from Super League backer News Ltd., and the relationship with parent organization PSG was left strained. Additionally, the promised TV coverage had quickly disappeared from French broadcaster Canal+'s schedule. The team would nonetheless return for a second season, at the cost of a reorganization that saw it stray even further from its developmental goals.

=== Results ===
Win Draw Loss

Date	Opponent	Venue	Score	Tries	Goals	Attendance
29 March 1996	Sheffield Eagles	Home	30–24	Cervello (2), Adams, Chamorin, Piskunov	Torreilles (3)	17,873
4 April 1996	London Broncos	Away	22–38	Bomati, Cervello, Ramandou, Turner	Torreilles (3)	9,638
8 April 1996	Oldham	Home	24–24	Bomati, Cabestany, Entat, Lucchese	Torreilles (4)	6,327
13 April 1996	Workington Town	Home	34–12	Chamorin, Bomati, Kacala, Pastre-Courtine	Torreilles (5)	6,534
21 April 1996	Warrington	Away	24–48	Pastre-Courtine (3), Vergniol	Torreilles (3)	4,123
5 May 1996	Wigan	Away	8–76	Wulf	Torreilles, Yaha	10,675
10 May 1996	Leeds	Home	14–40	Banquet (2), Cabestany	Torreilles	15,107
19 May 1996	Bradford	Away	32–60	Bomati (2), Banquet, Teixedo, Vergniol, Yaha	Chamorin (2), Torreilles (2)	8,194
27 May 1996	Halifax	Home	10–38	Toreilles, Vergniol	Torreilles	5,832
2 June 1996	St. Helens	Away	10–52	Bomati, Cervello	Torreilles	8,548
7 June 1996	Castelford	Home	22–54	Banquet (2), Brown (2)	Yaha (3)	6,618
15 June 1996	Sheffield	Away	18–52	Entat, Wulf, Yaha	Smith (3)	5,350
22 June 1996	Warrington	Home	24–26	Banquet, Bloomfield, Bomati, Lucchese, Smith	Smith (2)	5,254
28 June 1996	Oldham	Away	6–24	Wulf	Banquet	2,548
7 July 1996	Workington Town	Away	10–14	Bird, Vergniol	Banquet	2,173
13 July 1996	London Broncos	Home	24–18	Wilson (2), Bloomfield, Devecchi, Wulf	Smith (2)	9,114
20 July 1996	Wigan	Home	20–24	Chamorin (2), Bird, Bomati	Bomati, Smith	5,428
28 July 1996	Leeds	Away	12–34	Bord, Bloomfield	Smith (2)	6,479
4 August 1996	Halifax	Away	10–56	Griffiths, Vergniol	Chamorin	4,819
10 August 1996	St. Helens	Home	12–32	Bird, Bomati	Smith (2)	4,050
17 August 1996	Castleford	Away	18–22	Bird, Bomati, Devecchi, Vergniol	Banquet	4,473
24 August 1996	Bradford	Home	14–27	Bird, Wilson	Smith (3)	6,152

Before the season, it was pondered to play the 20 July clash against Wigan in Toulouse to avoid a conflict with the arrival of the Tour de France. That did not happen.

=== Table ===
Super League I
Pos	Team	Pld	W	D	L	PF	PA	PD	Pts	Qualification or relegation
1	St Helens (C)	22	20	0	2	950	455	+495	40	Qualified for Premiership semi final
2	Wigan	22	19	1	2	902	326	+576	39	Qualified for Premiership semi final
3	Bradford Bulls	22	17	0	5	767	409	+358	34	Qualified for Premiership semi final
4	London Broncos	22	12	1	9	611	462	+149	25	Qualified for Premiership semi final
5	Warrington Wolves	22	12	0	10	569	565	+4	24	
6	Halifax Blue Sox	22	10	1	11	667	576	+91	21	
7	Sheffield Eagles	22	10	0	12	599	730	−131	20	
8	Oldham Bears	22	9	1	12	473	681	−208	19	
9	Castleford Tigers	22	9	0	13	548	599	−51	18	
10	Leeds	22	6	0	16	555	745	−190	12	
11	Paris Saint-Germain	22	3	1	18	398	795	−397	7	
12	Workington Town (R)	22	2	1	19	325	1021	−696	5	Relegated to Division One

Source: Rugby League Project
Rules for classification: 1) Points; 2) Points difference; 3) Number of points scored;
(C) Champions; (R) Relegated

== Squad ==
Statistics include appearances and points in the Super League.

Player	Apps	Tries	Goals	DGs	Points
Darren Adams	10	1	0	0	4
Frédéric Banquet	18	7	4	0	36
Deon Bird	9	6	0	0	24
Vea Bloomfield	18	3	0	0	12
Pascal Bomati	19	10	0	0	40
John Boslem	5	0	0	0	0
Hadj Boudebza	2	0	0	0	0
Todd Brown	9	2	0	0	8
Justin Bryant	5	0	0	0	0
Didier Cabestany	20	2	0	0	8
Arnaud Cervello	4	4	0	0	16
Laurent Cambres	1	0	0	0	0
Pierre Chamorin	15	6	3	0	30
David Despin	1	0	0	0	0
Fabien Devecchi	18	2	0	0	8
Patrick Entat	22	2	0	0	8
Jonathan Griffiths	4	1	0	0	4
Pascal Jampy	4	0	0	0	0
Gregory Kacala	7	1	0	0	4
Mark Lane	2	0	0	0	0
Laurent Lucchese	18	2	0	0	8
Wilfried Moulinec	1	0	0	0	0
Jules Parry	12	0	0	0	0
Regis Pastre-Courtine	7	4	0	0	16
Jacques Pech	16	0	0	0	0
Mikhail Piskunov	2	1	0	0	4
Jean-Luc Ramondou	2	1	0	0	4
Philippe Ricard	1	0	0	0	0
Ian Russell	3	0	0	0	0
Jason Sands	17	0	0	0	0
Phil Shead	5	0	0	0	0
Danny Smith	12	1	15	0	34
Frédéric Teixido	4	1	0	0	4
Patrick Torreilles	10	1	25	0	54
Ian Turner	2	1	0	0	4
Gregory Tutard	2	0	0	0	0
Kava Utoikamanu	9	0	0	0	0
Eric Van Brussell	2	0	0	0	0
Eric Vergniol	15	6	0	0	24
George Wilson	9	3	0	0	12
Vincent Wulf	18	4	0	0	16
Bagdad Yaha	8	2	4	0	16
Ronel Zinon	4	0	0	0	0
