= Mikhail Piskunov =

France & Russia international rugby league footballer

Personal information
- Born: 21 December 1967 Moldova
- Died: 10 September 2002 (aged 34) France

Playing information

Rugby league
- Position: Wing, Centre
Club
Years	Team	Pld	T	G	FG	P
198?–93	Tiraspol	32	19	0	0
1993–95	Villefranche XIII Aveyron
1996–1997	Paris Saint-Germain	3	1	0	0	4
1997–98	Villefranche XIII Aveyron
	Total	35	20	0	0	4
Representative
Years	Team	Pld	T	G	FG	P
1992	Russia	3	0	0	0	0
1997	France	1	0	0	0	0

Rugby union
Club
Years	Team	Pld	T	G	FG	P
1998–99	Aurillac
1999–00	Aveyron
2000–02	Decazeville
	Total	0	0	0	0	0
- As of 20 November 2023

Mikhail Piskunov (21 December 1967 – 10 September 2002) was a professional rugby league and rugby union footballer who played for Paris Saint-Germain of the European Super League. He also represented France and Russia at international level.

In 2002, Piskunov died in a car accident at the age of 34.

== Playing career ==
=== Paris Saint-Germain ===
In 1996, Piskunov made his professional debut for PSG in Round 1 against the Sheffield Eagles. This was PSG's inaugural game in club history, winning 30–24. Mikhail Piskunov scored once that game.

=== International ===
Despite starting his club career in 1996, Piskunov was a national representative for the Russian national team (then known as the Commonwealth of Independent States). He played 2 games for the team at the centre position in 1992, both against South Africa. Piskunov's team won 30-26 and 22–19.

He represented France in 1997 in a game against South Africa. Playing wing, his side won 30–17.
