= Eddy Pettybourne =

US & Samoa international rugby league footballer

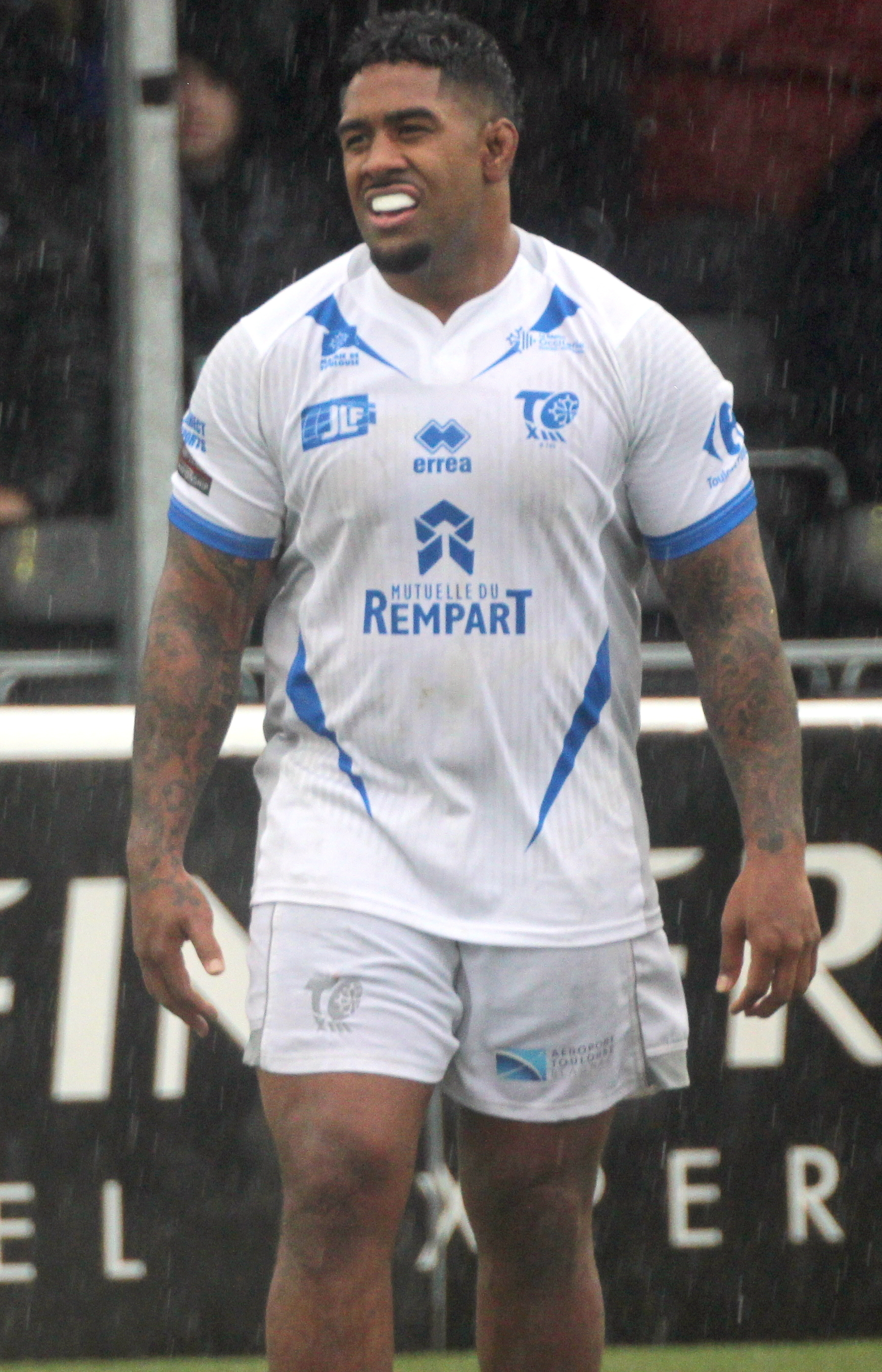

Personal information
- Full name: Edward Pettybourne
- Born: 13 February 1988 (age 38) Christchurch, New Zealand
- Height: 183 cm (6 ft 0 in)
- Weight: 108 kg (17 st 0 lb)

Playing information
- Position: Prop, Second-row, Lock
Club
Years	Team	Pld	T	G	FG	P
2007–12	South Sydney	91	13	0	0	52
2013	Wests Tigers	12	0	0	0	0
2014	Wigan Warriors	18	0	0	0	0
2015–17	Gold Coast Titans	34	0	0	0	0
2018–19	Toulouse Olympique	10	1	0	0	4
2019–21	Villeneuve Leopards	32	7	0	0	0
2021	Brooklyn Kings RLFC	2	0	0	0	0
2021–22	Red Star Belgrade	7	0	0	0	0
2021–22	Limoux Grizzlies	0	0	0	0	0
2022	Keighley Cougars	5	0	0	0	0
	Total	211	21	0	0	56
Representative
Years	Team	Pld	T	G	FG	P
2013	Samoa	1	0	0	0	0
2013–17	United States	34	0	0	0	0

Coaching information
Club
Years	Team	Gms	W	D	L	W%
2021	Villeneuve Leopards	0	0	0	0
- Source: As of 8 January 2023

Edward Pettybourne (born 13 February 1988) is a former professional rugby league footballer who last played as a prop for the Keighley Cougars. He played at international level for Samoa and the United States.

He previously played at club level in Australia in the NRL for the South Sydney Rabbitohs, Wests Tigers and the Gold Coast Titans, and in the Queensland Cup for the Tweed Heads Seagulls, and in Europe in the Super League for the Wigan Warriors, and in the Betfred Championship for Toulouse Olympique, as a prop, second-row or lock.

== Early years ==
Pettybourne was born in Christchurch, New Zealand.

A Mascot Jets junior, Pettybourne attended Marcellin College Randwick. He represented Australia at schoolboy level in 2005.

== Playing career ==
=== South Sydney Rabbitohs ===
Pettybourne made his NRL début against the North Queensland Cowboys in round 19 of 2007. He scored his first try in first grade in round 1 of 2009 when South Sydney defeated arch-rivals the Sydney Roosters 52-12. He played every game for South Sydney in 2009 and scored seven tries to be the club's fifth highest try scorer of the season. He made 526 tackles in 2009 which was the third highest in the club.

Pettybourne was a mainstay of South Sydney for the next three years, playing in over 20 games in both 2011 and 2012. He played in all 3 semi-finals in 2012, with the club finishing one game shy of the grand final.

=== Wests Tigers ===
With Souths unwilling to match the offer from Wests Tigers, Pettybourne joined his new club from 2013. Pettybourne said, "Madge, and the coaching staff said they wanted to keep me, but it was my choice. I just bought a house so I wanted to make sure I was comfortable paying it off, but it was more for my family."

Pettybourne stayed at the Wests Tigers for one season, playing in 12 games and failing to score any points.

=== Wigan Warriors ===
Pettybourne joined Super League club Wigan for the 2014 Super League season. He made his début in the opening game of the season against Huddersfield. On the 19 December 2014, Wigan announced that Pettybourne had been released from his contract for personal reasons. He left the Club half way through a two-year contract, after 18 games.

=== Gold Coast Titans ===
On 15 January 2015, Pettybourne signed a one-year contract with the Gold Coast starting effective immediately. On 10 July 2015, he re-signed with the Titans on a two-year contract.

=== Red Star Belgrade ===
On 5 June 2021, it was announced that Pettybourne had left Brooklyn Kings RLFC and signed for Red Star Belgrade following the postponement of the North American Rugby League 2021 season.

=== Limoux Grizzlies ===
On 6 July 2021, it was reported that he had signed for Limoux Grizzlies in the Elite One Championship On 6 November 2022, Pettybourne announced his retirement from rugby league.

== Representative career ==
=== New Zealand ===
In 2009, Pettybourne chose to represent New Zealand instead of playing for Australia. He was called up for the New Zealand squad at the 2009 Four Nations as a late replacement for the injured Ben Matulino and Bronson Harrison, but did not make any appearances for the team.

=== Samoa ===
In April 2013, Pettybourne played for Samoa in the Pacific Rugby League International against fierce pacific rivals Tonga.

=== United States ===
Later in the year, he was selected to play for the USA for the 2013 Rugby League World Cup. He played in all four of the US' world cup matches.

== Coaching career ==
On 9 March 2021, it was reported by Villeneuve Leopards that he would take over the role of interim head coach for their fixture with Limoux Grizzlies, until Olivier Janzac could take over on 15 March, following the dismissal of Fabien Devecchi.

Sporting positions
Preceded by Fabien Devecchi; 20??-2021	Coach (Interim) Villeneuve Leopards; 2021	Succeeded by Olivier Janzac; 2021-present
