= Olivier Janzac =

Former France international rugby league footballer

Personal information
- Full name: Olivier Janzac
- Born: 2 January 1980 (age 46) Toulouse, France

Playing information
- Position: Fullback, Wing, Five-eighth
Club
Years	Team	Pld	T	G	FG	P
2005	Toulouse Olympique
	New York Knights
	Lézignan Sangliers
	Total	0	0	0	0	0
Representative
Years	Team	Pld	T	G	FG	P
	France

Coaching information
Club
Years	Team	Gms	W	D	L	W%
2021–	Villeneuve Leopards	0	0	0	0
Representative
Years	Team	Gms	W	D	L	W%
2008–13	France	0	0	0	0
2025–	Morocco	0	0	0	0
- As of 24 January 2026

Olivier Janzac (born 2 January 1980), born in Toulouse, France, is a French rugby league head coach of Villeneuve Leopards in the French Elite One Championship rugby league competition. He previously played for New York Knights in the AMNRL. His position of choice is at Fullback, wing and five-eighth. He has also played for the France national rugby league team.

== Coaching career ==
Janzac coached the France women's national rugby league team at the 2008 and 2013 Women's Rugby League World Cups.

On 9 March 2021 it was reported that Olivier had been appointed as head coach of Villeneuve Leopards following the dismissal of Fabien Devecchi, who remains at the club albeit in a different role.

On 24 January 2025 it was reported that he had taken up the role of head-coach for Morocco

Sporting positions
Preceded by Eddy Pettybourne (Interim); 2021	Coach Villeneuve Leopards; 2021-present	Succeeded by Incumbent
