= Jason Keough =

Australian rugby league footballer

Personal information
- Full name: Jason Keough
- Born: 21 November 1972 (age 52)

Playing information
- Position: Centre, Wing
Club
Years	Team	Pld	T	G	FG	P
1993–94	Eastern Suburbs	23	2	0	0	8
1995	South Sydney	6	0	0	0	0
1997	Paris Saint-Germain	2	2	0	0	8
1998	Western Suburbs	5	0	0	0	0
	Total	36	4	0	0	16
- Source: As of 3 January 2023

Jason Keough (/kiːoʊ/) (born 21 November 1972) is an Australian former professional rugby league footballer who played in the 1990s. He played for Eastern Suburbs, South Sydney Rabbitohs, and Western Suburbs Magpies in the NSWRL/ARL/NRL competitions and for Paris Saint-Germain in the Super League.

== Playing career ==
Keough was signed by the Eastern Suburbs in 1992. He made his first grade debut for the club in his side's 18–7 loss to the Balmain Tigers at the Sydney Football Stadium in round 9 of the 1993 NSWRL season . Keough spent two years at Easts making 23 appearances before switching to arch-rivals South Sydney. Keough played a total of six games for Souths over two years. He was contracted with the side in 1996 but only played for the reserve grade team. In 1997, Keough played one season with the now defunct Paris Saint-Germain rugby league team before returning to Australia where he finished his career with Western Suburbs.
