= Ian Turner (rugby league) =

Australian rugby league footballer & businessman

Personal information
- Full name: Ian Robert Turner
- Born: 28 May 1970 (age 55) Warwick, Queensland, Australia

Playing information
- Height: 188 cm (6 ft 2 in)
- Weight: 97 kg (15 st 4 lb)
- Position: Centre, Second-row
Club
Years	Team	Pld	T	G	FG	P
1991–93	Past Brothers RLFC	59	31	8	0	140
1994–97	Souths RLFC	88	46	4	0	224
1995–96	Union Treiziste Catalane	21	12	12	0
1996	Paris Saint-Germain	6	1			4
1998–99	Wynnum Manly Seagulls	21	13	0	0	52
	Total	195	103	24	0	420

Ian Turner (born in Warwick, Queensland on 28 May 1970) is an Australian businessman and former rugby league footballer.

Turner was a Brisbane Broncos scholarship player in 1991, in conjunction with Brothers RLFC, coming from Runaway Bay RLFC after Colts Group 18 Grand Final Win. He was a member Souths RLFC for most of his career. He played in the centres and back row. Turner signed with the Super League for the 1995–96 season playing for French team Paris Saint-Germain in the first Super League match worldwide at Stade Sébastien Charléty in Paris against the Sheffield Eagles. He also played with Union Treiziste Catalane. A season-ending neck injury saw him return to Australia playing again for Souths RLFC taking the season's top try scorer award in 1997 and named in the team of the decade, before signing for Wynnum Manly Seagulls for seasons 1998 and 1999 in the Queensland Cup.

Turner also represented Queensland in OzTag playing in two State of Origin Series after retiring from rugby league.
