= Joe Taylor (rugby league, born 1975) =

Australian rugby league footballer

Personal information
- Full name: Joe Taylor
- Born: 8 November 1975 (age 49)

Playing information
- Position: Prop
Club
Years	Team	Pld	T	G	FG	P
1997	Paris Saint-Germain	20	2	0	0	8
1998	Manly Sea Eagles	17	0	0	0	0
	Total	37	2	0	0	8

Joe Taylor (born 8 November 1975) is an Australian former professional rugby league footballer who played as a prop in the 1990s.

He played at club level for Paris Saint-Germain Rugby League in the Super League and the Manly-Warringah Sea Eagles in the NRL.
