= Matt Seers =

Australian rugby league player

Personal information
- Full name: Matthew Seers
- Born: 28 June 1974 (age 52) Gosford, New South Wales, Australia
- Height: 175 cm (5 ft 9 in)

Playing information
- Position: Fullback, Centre, Five-eighth
Club
Years	Team	Pld	T	G	FG	P
1993–99	North Sydney Bears	133	45	0	0	180
2000–02	Wests Tigers	54	13	0	0	52
2003	Wakefield Trinity Wildcats	12	2	0	0	8
	Total	199	60	0	0	240
Representative
Years	Team	Pld	T	G	FG	P
1995–97	NSW Country	2	1	0	0	4
1995–97	New South Wales	4	0	0	0	0
- Relatives: Craig Field (cousin)

Matt Seers (born 28 June 1974) is an Australian former professional rugby league footballer who played in the 1990s and 2000s. He played for the North Sydney Bears, Wests Tigers and Wakefield Trinity Wildcats, as a fullback, centre or five-eighth.

== Club career ==
Seers played his junior football with Cudgen Hornets before becoming a student of St Gregory's College, Campbelltown for his senior years of high school. He was an Australian Secondary Schoolboys Representative in 1992.

On the 29 August 1993, Seers made his first grade début against South Sydney coming off the bench in a 36-16 victory at the Sydney Football Stadium.

In 1994, Seers' talent kept experienced fullback Greg Barwick in reserve grade and, in 1994, forced the club's star signing, Manly-Warringah fullback Ivan Cleary, into the centres. He was named Norwich "Rising Star of the Year" that season. In the 1994 preliminary final against Canberra, Seers managed to chase down Canberra Fullback Brett Mullins who had made a break down the centre of the field and had looked certain to score a try. Norths went on to lose the game 22-9.

In 1996, Seers played 18 games and scored 7 tries including a try in the 1996 preliminary final defeat against St. George.

In 1997, Seers played in 25 games as Norths made it to the preliminary final before losing to eventual premiers Newcastle. During the match with Newcastle leading 12-4, Seers made a break down the right hand touchline and looked certain to score a try when Darren Albert raced across the field and tackled Seers just short of the line.

Norths made the semis again in 1998, with Seers making a mid-season change to centre and Ben Ikin playing at fullback. He played in both finals matches which both ended in defeat against Parramatta and Canterbury-Bankstown.

Seers played 133 games for Norths including the club's final ever game in first grade which was a 28-18 victory over North Queensland in Townsville in which Seers was sin binned. After a troubled period in which he was admitted into rehab for a drug problem, Seers signed with the Tigers for 2000.

After initially being left out of the first Wests Tigers' teams, Seers had some success under coach Terry Lamb. Seers moved to the Super League club the Wakefield Trinity Wildcats for the 2003 season. He was released by the club in August the same year after breaking his hand a few months earlier.

Seers signed a one-year contract with the Cronulla-Sutherland Sharks for the 2004 season, but failed to play any first grade. In 2010, Seers joined Craig Field to play for the Cudgen Hornets in the Northern Rivers Regional Rugby League.

== Representative ==
In 1995, Seers made his début at fullback for Country Origin. Two years later he scored a try in the team's 17-4 victory over City.

Seers was selected for New South Wales in four State of Origin games. He was on the bench for the first and third games in 1995, and the second match of the 1997 series. Seers was given a start on the wing in the third 1997 Origin game.

== Personal life ==
Seers is the cousin of former Tiger team-mate Craig Field.

On 15 January 2015 Seers was arrested and charged with supplying and trafficking cocaine. In February 2018 Seers was sentenced to 4 years imprisonment (balance suspended after he served 12 months in jail) for his part in a syndicate that provided cocaine to footballers.

== Sources ==
- Alan Whiticker & Glen Hudson (2007). The Encyclopedia of Rugby League Players. Wetherill Park, New South Wales: Gary Allen Pty Ltd. ISBN 978-1-877082-93-1.
