= Greg Barwick =

Australian rugby league footballer

Personal information
- Full name: Greg Barwick
- Born: 5 June 1968 (age 58) Sydney, New South Wales, Australia

Playing information
- Position: Fullback, Centre, Wing
Club
Years	Team	Pld	T	G	FG	P
1988–89	Canterbury-Bankstown	6	0	10	0	20
1990–91	Penrith Panthers	24	10	22	0	84
1992–94	North Sydney	25	4	0	1	17
1995	Balmain	17	0	37	1	75
1996–97	London Broncos	50	22	123	2	336
	Total	122	36	192	4	532
- Source: As of 24 January 2019

Greg Barwick is an Australian former professional rugby league footballer who played in the 1980s and 1990s.

== Playing career ==
A noted fullback and kicker, Barwick played for the Canterbury-Bankstown Bulldogs between 1988 and 1989 but did not play in the premiership winning grand final side of 1988, Penrith Panthers between 1990 and 1991, North Sydney Bears between 1992 and 1993 & Balmain known as the "Sydney Tigers" at the time in 1995 in the NSWRL Winfield Cup and the London Broncos in the Super League.

A Milperra Colts junior, Barwick made his first grade debut for Canterbury-Bankstown in Round 11 1988 against Newcastle. Barwick played in the major semi final that year against Cronulla but was not selected to play in the 1988 grand final victory over Balmain.

Barwick was fullback for Penrith in their successful 1991 NSWRL premiership. Following the grand final victory he travelled with the Panthers to England for the 1991 World Club Challenge which was lost to Wigan.

In 1992, Barwick signed with North Sydney and was regular starter for the side in the 1992 and 1993 seasons but a series of injuries and the emergence of Matt Seers left Barwick on the outer at North Sydney and played the entire 1994 season in reserve grade. In 1995, Barwick joined Balmain who had renamed themselves the "Sydney Tigers" and moved their home games to Parramatta Stadium at the beginning of the Super League war.

Barwick spent the 1996 and 1997 seasons at the London Broncos in the Super League before retiring.
