= 1996 Super League season =

Rugby league competition

Super League I
- League: Super League
- Duration: 22 Rounds
- Teams: 12
- Highest attendance: 20,429; Wigan vs St Helens (21 June)
- Lowest attendance: 1,400; Workington Town vs London Broncos (23 June)
- Total attendance: 867,372 (average 6,571)
- Broadcast partners: Sky Sports

1996 Season
- Champions: St Helens; 1st Super League title 8th British title
- Runners-up: Wigan
- Premiership winners: Wigan
- Man of Steel: (England) Andy Farrell
- Top point-scorer: (England) Bobbie Goulding (257)
- Top try-scorer: (England) Paul Newlove (28)

Promotion and relegation
- Promoted from Division One: Salford Reds
- Relegated to Division One: Workington Town

The Stones Bitter Super League I was the official name for 1996's 102nd season of top-level rugby league football, and the first year of Europe's new championship: Super League. It is also the first season of rugby league to be played in summer. The competition featured all eleven teams from the 1995-96 RFL First Division plus one expansion club, Paris Saint-Germain.

== Teams ==
Twelve teams were selected to play in the inaugural Super League season.

Legend
Reigning Champions
Challenge Cup Holders
Promoted/ New franchise

	Team	1995-96 position	Stadium	Capacity	City/Area
	Bradford Bulls	7th	Odsal	27,000	Bradford, West Yorkshire
	Castleford Tigers	6th	Wheldon Road	11,750	Castleford, West Yorkshire
	Halifax Blue Sox	3rd	Thrum Hall	9,832	Halifax, West Yorkshire
	Leeds	2nd	Headingley	21,500	Leeds, West Yorkshire
	London Broncos	10th	The Valley	27,000	Charlton, Greater London
	Oldham Bears	8th	Watersheddings	9,000	Oldham, Greater Manchester
	Paris Saint-Germain	N/A	Sébastien Charléty Stadium	20,000	Paris, France
	Sheffield Eagles	5th	Don Valley Stadium	25,000	Sheffield, South Yorkshire
	St Helens	4th	Knowsley Road	17,500	St Helens, Mersyside
	Warrington Wolves	9th	Wilderspool	9,200	Warrington, Cheshire
D*	Wigan	1st	Central Park	18,000	Wigan, Greater Manchester
	Workington Town	11th	Derwent Park	10,000	Workington, Cumbria

- D*-League and Cup winners

== Formation ==
=== Original plan ===
Although RFL chairman Maurice Lindsay had pushed for a more modern top-flight setup for some time, his previous efforts had only resulted in a tepid reform during the 1994 offseason. The more radical Super League came together over just ninety-six hours in early April 1995, following overtures by emissaries of Australian media conglomerate News Ltd., who were looking for international partners to sway the battle for the control of Australian rugby league in their favour. The first rumours transpiring from the talks mentioned a 1997 start. News' plan entailed moving the RFL season to summer to align it with the southern hemisphere, to which St Helens and Leeds were said to be the most reticent. In particular, Leeds feared scheduling conflicts with the Yorkshire County Cricket Club, but they were quickly won over by the financial opportunities promised by the Murdoch deal.

The English game's new era officially began on 8 April 1995, when RFL clubs voted to approve the £77 million package negotiated with News to help the transition. The initial plan for the European Super League (so named because it was then supposed to share the Super League moniker with an Australasian equivalent) included fourteen teams. Several of the twelve projected English teams were composites of existing small-town clubs. The initial plan was for the amalgamated teams to rotate between several stadiums, which would be replaced by a single, state-of-the-art venue in the future. Clubs could turn down the merger and be assigned to the second tier instead. Two French teams were added to give the competition the requisite European stature. Their management was entrusted to veteran coach Jacques Fouroux, who had recently founded a summer competition of his own called France Rugby League. Promotion and relegation would be frozen for the first two seasons.

A Cardiff side was also slated to begin play in the second tier with an eye on promotion (a hastily thrown together Welsh club did take the field, but never reached those heights). An agent claimed that three Wales union stars, Mike Hall, Tony Clement and Robert Jones had inquired via a third party about the salaries on offer in the Super League, which Hall angrily denied, accusing the younger code of using his name for publicity. More speculative were plans for a team in Dublin, as was Jacques Fouroux's dream of teams in Barcelona (made up of players from French Catalonia) and Milan, which even the progressive Maurice Lindsay called unlikely.

Legacy markets	Consolidated markets		Expansion markets
Legacy markets	Existing teams	Merged as	Expansion markets
Bradford	Castleford, Wakefield, Featherstone	Calder	Paris
Halifax	Hull F.C., Hull Kingston Rovers	Humberside	Toulouse (Note: Contemporary press indicates that the Toulouse market would have been represented by a new team, rather than the historic Toulouse Olympique.)
Leeds	Oldham, Salford	Manchester	—N/a
London (Note: Guaranteed promotion from Second Division on economic grounds.)	Sheffield, Doncaster	South Yorkshire	—N/a
St Helens	Warrington, Widnes	Cheshire	—N/a
Wigan	Workington, Whitehaven, Barrow, Carlisle	Cumbria	—N/a

The reform immediately drew the opposition of the fanbases involved in the planned mergers, as well as a group of MPs and the Rugby League Professional Players' Association. Additionally, second-tier champions Keighley threatened to sue to get the promotion they had earned on the field prior to the reform. Maurice Lindsay suggested that they enter the Super League via a merger with Bradford, which the club strenuously refused. Halifax was also briefly in talks to merge with Bradford or Huddersfield due to their outdated stadium. Their board of director did vote to merge with the former, but met with strong hostility from the community and did not proceed. Wigan president Jack Robinson even threatened an unlikely merger with the sport's other powerhouse St Helens, although this was primarily a political powerplay to put pressure on the city as he was looking for subsidies to upgrade his club's ground. Widnes, for its part, refused to merge with Warrington and instead opted to take first place on the Super League waiting list, due to the likely cancellation of the second French team based in Toulouse, which was confirmed a few days later when Fouroux opted to focus his efforts on a single club.

=== Revised setup ===
However, following another meeting on May 1, 1995, Murdoch's financial contribution was increased to £87 million and a new format was agreed upon by a majority of clubs. The mergers were abandoned but, rather than enlarge the Superleague contingent as speculated, it was decided to trim it further to twelve teams: the capital cities of Paris and London, plus the top ten of the 1994–95 First Division campaign. This was supposed to amount to £1.1 million for each Super League club, although these projections were later lowered to £830,000 after the RFL took its share of it to finance central operating costs. Half of the Murdoch money was set aside for ground improvements.

Salford, who did not make the cut, put in a bid to convince the RFL to let them represent Manchester in place of higher ranked Oldham, but ultimately chose to accept the new plan for the good of the game. However, Widnes, which had just been reinstated thanks to Toulouse's withdrawal, found itself out of the league once more, on the basis of its uncharacteristically poor 1994–95 ranking. The club launched a lawsuit of its own against the RFL. It was summarily dismissed at the end of May, but Widnes and Keighley kept dragging their feet to sign the Super League agreement, demanding formal guarantees that a promotion and relegation system be preserved. In mid-July, the RFL voted in favour of a "one up, one down" scheme with immediate effect. Keighley dropped their lawsuit shortly after.

== Operational rules ==
Game presentation:

- The Rugby Football League Council approved a proposal by Super League chief executives to adopt squad numbering. Players would wear a number (1-25) on their shirts all season in addition to their names.
- A video screen was added at all fields to announce the in-goal referee or video referee's decision.

Rules to ensure the sustainability of Super League clubs were introduced:

- Clubs operated under a series of financial rules that specified spending levels in different areas of club operations, demanded that clubs' accounts be submitted monthly for monitoring.
- A salary cap restricted clubs from spending more than 40% of their income on players.

To protect global Super League interests:

- Due to the Super League war in Australia, a number of British players signed "loyalty" contracts which gave News Corporation a veto power over them in an attempt to prevent transfers to Australian Rugby League clubs. ARL boss Ken Arthurson had previously warned that his organisation was not bound to respect the RFL's player rights any more following its alignment with the Murdoch camp.
- As non-traditional markets, London and Paris were exempted from the league's six-import limit.

=== Rule changes ===
Four new rules were introduced for the inaugural Super League season:

- Scrums were now to be set 20 metres from the touch-line, with the aim of creating attacking opportunities.
- At the restart after a try has been scored and the conversion attempt has been taken, the side that scored will now kick off to the other team. This change aimed to make contests more even by almost guaranteeing possession for the side that had conceded points. Greg McCallum, the director of referees' coaching, also noted that this convention was "in line with most other sports" and "that is significant when we come to promoting the game in America and Asia".

In an attempt to "clean up" the ruck:

- At the play-the-ball, the side not in possession was barred from striking for the ball.
- Also at the play-the-ball, the tackled player was stopped from being able to tap the ball forwards to himself - even in the absence of markers.

== Media coverage ==
The beginning of the Super League era coincided with that of a new TV contract with Murdoch's Sky Sports, which was already the First Division's broadcaster, but now offered a more thorough schedule, featuring a Friday and a Saturday game on most weeks. Up to seventeen cameras, including seven replay angles, were used. Video judges now replaced in-goal judges during games broadcast on Sky.

== Season summary ==
On 29 March 1996, Super League kicked off in Paris before 17,873 people at the Charlety Stadium when new team Paris Saint Germain overcame Sheffield Eagles 30–24. Despite air traffic disruptions that forced members of the British press to seek alternate means of transport, the Super League received ample plaudits for its opener, with PSG president Jacques Fouroux declaring that night: "Ninety eight per cent of them [the crowd] were new to the game, but they understood it right away. They saw tries, lots of commitment and lots of movement. They saw beauty. They attended a great party."

Pundits announced that the season would be more competitive than seen in recent memory, and predicted that St Helens would mount a serious challenge for Wigan's title. The Saints fulfilled those promises, and were crowned inaugural Super League champions after a win over Warrington Wolves at Knowsley Road, finishing in first position on the league ladder. During the year a secondary title, known as the Premiership was also played, with the final being contested between Wigan and the championship winners St Helens with Wigan coming out victorious and Andy Farrell winning the Harry Sunderland Trophy.

While a French team was an unknown quantity at this level, Paris Saint-Germain was deemed capable of at least avoiding relegation. Workington Town were the overwhelming favourites for the wooden spoon, and failed to beat the odds, finishing at the bottom of the standings for the second successive season. To date this is their only Super League season and no other club from Cumbria has competed since, Salford Reds were promoted to take their place in Super League II.

== Table ==
Super League I
Pos	Team	Pld	W	D	L	PF	PA	PD	Pts	Qualification or relegation
1	St Helens (C)	22	20	0	2	950	455	+495	40	Qualified for Premiership semi final
2	Wigan	22	19	1	2	902	326	+576	39	Qualified for Premiership semi final
3	Bradford Bulls	22	17	0	5	767	409	+358	34	Qualified for Premiership semi final
4	London Broncos	22	12	1	9	611	462	+149	25	Qualified for Premiership semi final
5	Warrington Wolves	22	12	0	10	569	565	+4	24	
6	Halifax Blue Sox	22	10	1	11	667	576	+91	21	
7	Sheffield Eagles	22	10	0	12	599	730	−131	20	
8	Oldham Bears	22	9	1	12	473	681	−208	19	
9	Castleford Tigers	22	9	0	13	548	599	−51	18	
10	Leeds	22	6	0	16	555	745	−190	12	
11	Paris Saint-Germain	22	3	1	18	398	795	−397	7	
12	Workington Town (R)	22	2	1	19	325	1021	−696	5	Relegated to Division One

Source: Rugby League Project
Rules for classification: 1) Points; 2) Points difference; 3) Number of points scored;
(C) Champions; (R) Relegated

== Premiership ==
The top four finishing teams competed in a short play-off series for the Premiership Trophy. This competition was separate to the Super League Championship awarded to St Helens, and continued a long tradition in British rugby league of crowning a season champion and an end of season Premier. The final was played between the Wigan and St Helens on Sunday, 8 September at Old Trafford before a crowd of 35,013. Wigan won the match 44-14 and their loose forward Andy Farrell received the Harry Sunderland Trophy as man-of-the-match.

Semifinals
1	St Helens	25
4	London Broncos	14
2	Wigan	42
3	Bradford Bulls	36

Final
St Helens	14
Wigan	44

== Statistics ==
The following are the top points scorers in the Super League during the 1996 season. Statistics are for league matches only.

Most tries

Player	Team	Tries
Paul Newlove	St Helens	28
Jason Robinson	Wigan	24
John Bentley	Halifax Blue Sox	21
Henry Paul	Wigan	20
Danny Arnold	St Helens	19
Robbie Paul	Bradford Bulls	18
Richard Henare	Warrington	17
Keith Senior	Sheffield Eagles	17
Greg Barwick	London Broncos	16
Rob Smyth	Wigan	16
Anthony Sullivan	St Helens	16

Most goals

Player	Team	Goals
Bobbie Goulding	St Helens	117
Andy Farrell	Wigan	103
John Schuster	Halifax Blue Sox	101
Mark Aston	Sheffield Eagles	86
Frano Botica	Castleford Tigers	84
Steve McNamara	Bradford Bulls	78
Graham Holroyd	Leeds	76
Iestyn Harris	Warrington	63
Greg Barwick	London Broncos	50
Francis Maloney	Oldham Bears	45

Most points

Player	Team	Tries	Goals	DGs	Points
Bobbie Goulding	St Helens	5	117	3	257
John Schuster	Halifax Blue Sox	8	101	2	236
Andy Farrell	Wigan	5	103	0	226
Graham Holroyd	Leeds	11	76	2	198
Frano Botica	Castleford Tigers	5	84	2	190
Mark Aston	Sheffield Eagles	2	86	1	181
Greg Barwick	London Broncos	16	50	2	166
Steve McNamara	Bradford Bulls	1	78	2	162
Iestyn Harris	Warrington	4	63	2	144
Francis Maloney	Oldham Bears	6	45	0	114

== See also ==
- Super League war
- 1996 Challenge Cup
