= Craig Field =

Australian RL coach and former rugby league footballer

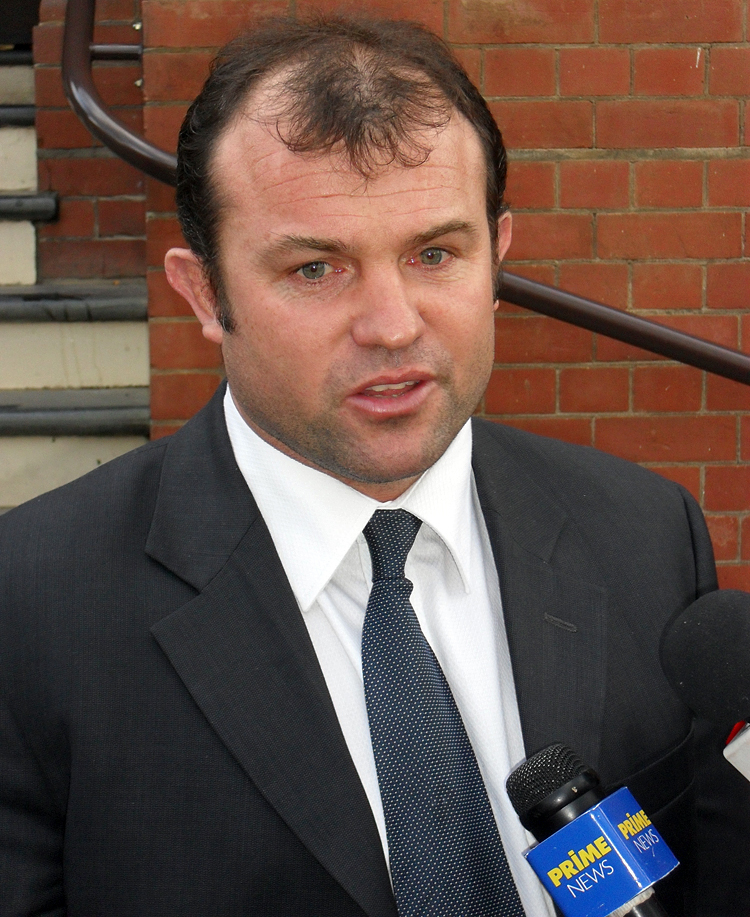

Personal information
- Full name: Craig Steven Field
- Born: 12 December 1972 (age 53) Paddington, New South Wales, Australia

Playing information
- Height: 169 cm (5 ft 7 in)
- Weight: 78 kg (12 st 4 lb)
- Position: Halfback
Club
Years	Team	Pld	T	G	FG	P
1990–96	South Sydney	84	22	83	0	254
1997–99	Manly Sea Eagles	54	7	44	3	119
1999	Balmain Tigers	17	2	1	2	12
2000–01	Wests Tigers	28	4	7	3	33
2002–03	Baroudeurs de Pia XIII	0	0	0	0	0
	Total	183	35	135	8	418

Coaching information
Club
Years	Team	Gms	W	D	L	W%
2003	Baroudeurs de Pia XIII	0	0	0	0
- Relatives: Matt Seers (cousin)

Craig Field (born 12 December 1972) is an Australian former professional rugby league footballer. Field played for South Sydney, Manly-Warringah Sea Eagles, Balmain Tigers and Wests Tigers. His primary position was at halfback. His talent and leadership on the field was hampered by off-field incidents throughout his career. He served a jail term for the manslaughter of a 50-year-old man in 2012.

Craig Field is the cousin of former Norths and Wests Tigers fullback and NSW Origin representative Matt Seers.

== Playing career ==
Field made his debut with South Sydney as a seventeen-year-old in 1990, playing one game from the bench. By 1993, with his flashes of brilliance on-field, he had earned himself a position in the first-grade team on a regular basis and in 1994 he was promoted to captain.

In 1995, Field was stripped of the captaincy and fined $10,000 for missing training and at the end of the 1996 season he left the Rabbitohs for Manly-Warringah. Both Cliff Lyons and Geoff Toovey were in the Manly team and Field had to compete against the two test halves for the halfback position. Field was a member of the 1997 Manly side which lost the Grand Final to the Newcastle Knights.

Early in 1999, Field requested a release from the Manly club and he played his last game with the team in round 5. In round 7, he steered his new club, Balmain, to a win over Manly.

Field became a Wests Tiger in 2000 when Balmain and Western Suburbs merged at the end of the 1999 season. After only four games of the 2001 season, Field and teammate, Kevin McGuinness, were suspended by the National Rugby League (NRL) for six months after testing positive for stimulants. Field did not participate in any other first-grade games in Australia.

In 2002, Field moved to the south-west of France to play for the Pia Donkeys in the French Rugby League Championship. Following the sacking of coach John Elias in February, 2003, Field took over coaching duties and led Pia in the club's 16–14 loss in the French Cup final. On his return to Australia in May, 2003, Field joined the Newtown Jets in the premier-league competition, captaining the side for the remainder of the season.

From 2005 till 2009, Field was captain-coach of Wagga Brothers in the Group 9 competition. In 2010, he joined the Cudgen Hornets in the Northern Rivers Regional Rugby League, along with his cousin Matt Seers. After two seasons with the Hornets, Field retired as a player but remained with the club as coach.

In 2013, at age 40, Field was playing A-grade park football for Moore Park club in the South Sydney junior league competition.

== Personal life ==
=== 2007 Armed Robbery ===
Craig Field discussing the case with the media

After claiming to be the victim of an armed robbery on the night of 18 February 2007 at a hotel in Wagga Wagga, of which he was manager at the time, it was alleged that the robbery had been staged and Field was subsequently charged with recruiting a child to participate in a criminal activity, making a false statement to police and three counts of stealing after a robbery. On 11 August 2009, after a four-day trial at Wagga Wagga Court House, Field was acquitted of all charges by a majority (11–1) jury verdict.

=== 2012 Kelvin Kane case ===
On 15 July 2012, Field was arrested and charged with assault occasioning grievous bodily harm after allegedly punching 50-year-old Kelvin Kane outside a hotel in Kingscliff, New South Wales. Kane was knocked unconscious and required cardiopulmonary resuscitation when paramedics arrived at the scene. He later died in hospital, prompting the charges against Field to be upgraded to murder. Field was released from prison on 18 December 2012 after a A$10,000 bail bond was posted, with strict reporting conditions. The murder trial, in which Field pleaded not guilty, began in November 2014. On 9 December 2014, Field was found not guilty of murder, but guilty of manslaughter over the death of Kane. He was sentenced to a maximum of 10 years and a minimum of 7½ years. Field was released from prison on 3 January 2022.

In 2023 it was reported Field was living on the Gold Coast working in construction. He was invited to speak with the Manly Sea Eagles about his experiences on and off the field.
