= Jamie Olejnik =

Australian rugby league footballer

Personal information
- Full name: Jamie Olejnik
- Born: 8 March 1973 (age 52); Sydney, New South Wales, Australia

Playing information
- Position: Centre
Club
Years	Team	Pld	T	G	FG	P
1992	Penrith Panthers	11	0	0	0	0
1993–94	Manly Sea Eagles	11	7	0	0	28
1995	Western Reds	7	1	0	0	4
1997	Paris Saint-Germain	11	9	0	0	36
1998	Manly Sea Eagles	11	1	0	0	4
	Total	51	18	0	0	72

Jamie Olejnik (/oʊldʒnɪk/) (born 8 March 1973) is a former professional rugby league footballer who played in the 1990s. His preferred position was centre.
