= Pierre Chamorin =

France international rugby league player

Personal information
- Born: 22 July 1970 (age 56) France

Playing information
- Position: Centre, Stand-off
Club
| Years | Team | Pld | T | G | FG | P |
|---|---|---|---|---|---|---|
| 19??–96 | AS Saint-Estève |
| 1996–97 | Paris Saint-Germain |
| ????–?? | Union Treiziste Catalane |
| | Total | 0 | 0 | 0 | 0 | 0 |
Representative
| Years | Team | Pld | T | G | FG | P |
| 1989–95 | France | 17 | 2 | 2 | 1 | 13 |

Pierre Chamorin is a French former professional rugby league footballer who represented France at the 1995 World Cup.

== Playing career ==
Chamorin started his career for AS Saint-Estève, with which he won several French Championship and Lord Derby Cup titles in the 1990s. He made his debut for France in 1989 against New Zealand. He went on to play in seventeen test matches for France, including against the 1994 Kangaroos. His last match was at the 1995 World Cup, against Western Samoa. Chamorin played in Super League I and Super League II for Paris Saint-Germain, captaining the side.

== Personal life ==
His father is Henri Chamorin, a former rugby league international who played as second row or as lock forward in the 1960s.

After his playing career, he "is in charge of the training of the juniors".

== Honours ==
- French Rugby League Championship:
  - Champion in 1989, 1990, 1993 and 1997 (Saint-Estève)
  - Runner-up in 1992, 1995 and 1996 (Saint-Estève)
- Lord Derby Cup
  - Champion in 1994, 1995, and 1998 (Saint-Estève)
  - Runner-up in 1990 (Saint-Estève)
