= Adam Peters (rugby league) =

Australian rugby league footballer (born 1974)

Personal information
- Full name: Adam Peters
- Born: 6 June 1974 (age 52)

Playing information
- Position: Second-row
Club
Years	Team	Pld	T	G	FG	P
1996	Canberra	1	0	0	0	0
1997	Paris Saint-Germain	19	1	0	0	4
1998–99	Manly-Warringah	29	3	0	0	12
2000–01	Canberra	16	1	0	0	4
	Total	65	5	0	0	20
- Source: As of 25 January 2023

Adam Peters (born 6 June 1974) is an Australian former professional rugby league footballer who played in the 1990s and 2000s. He played for Manly-Warringah and Canberra in the ARL/NRL competitions and for Paris Saint-Germain in the Super League.

== Playing career ==
Peters made his first grade debut for Canberra in round 3 of the 1996 ARL season against Parramatta at Bruce Stadium. Peters played off the bench in Canberra's 20-14 loss. In 1997, he joined Paris Saint-Germain in the Super League and played 19 games before the club folded. Peters then returned to Australia with Manly in the NRL competition. He would go on to be a regular with the team in the 1998 NRL season and played in the clubs elimination finals loss to his former team Canberra. Peters featured less for Manly in the 1999 season making only eight appearances before switching back to Canberra.

In his first season back at Canberra, he played in both of the clubs finals matches against Penrith and the Sydney Roosters. Peters final game in the top grade came in round 24 of the 2001 NRL season against the Northern Eagles.
