= Laurent Lucchese =

France international rugby league player

Personal information
- Born: 4 April 1973 (age 52) France

Playing information
- Position: Fullback
Club
Years	Team	Pld	T	G	FG	P
199?	Villeneuve
1998–01	Toulouse
1993–95	Huddersfield Giants	16	0	0	0	0
1994–95	Sheffield Eagles
1996	Paris Saint-Germain	18	2	0	0	8
199?	Villeneuve	18	2	0	0	8
19??	AS Carcassonne
	Total	52	4	0	0	16
Representative
Years	Team	Pld	T	G	FG	P
1995–97	France	5	0	0	0	0

Laurent Lucchese (born 4 April 1973) is a French former professional rugby league footballer who played as a fullback for Huddersfield, Sheffield Eagles and Paris Saint-Germain. He also represented France at international level.

Lucchese played in the first ever Super League game in 1996, starting at fullback for Paris Saint-Germain in the victory against Sheffield Eagles.

== Honours ==
- Team honours:
  - Champion of France : 1998 (Villeneuve-sur-Lot) et 2000 (Toulouse).
  - French Championship : Runner-up in 1997 (Villeneuve-sur-Lot).
  - Coupe de France : Runner-up in 2004 (Carcassonne).
