= Paris Saint-Germain Rugby League =

Rugby league team

Paris Saint-Germain

Club information
- Full name: Paris Saint-Germain Rugby League
- Short name: PSG Rugby League, PSG RL
- Colours: Red and Blue
- Founded: 23 December 1995; 30 years ago
- Exited: 3 November 1997; 28 years ago

Former details
- Ground: Stade Sébastien Charléty (20,000)
- Chairman: Jacques Larrose
- Manager: Andy Goodway
- Captain: David O'Donnell
- Competition: Super League

Paris Saint-Germain Rugby League, commonly referred to as PSG Rugby League or PSG RL, was a French professional rugby league club based in Paris, France. It operated as the rugby league department of Paris Saint-Germain FC. Founded in 1995, the club was established as part of an expansion project for the Super League, the top division of the British rugby league system, in which it competed from 1996 until its closure in 1997. Created under president Jacques Fouroux with the support of French media giants Canal+ and Australian media conglomerate News Corp Australia, PSG RL became the first French team to participate in the competition. The club played its home matches at the Stade Sébastien Charléty, with a capacity of 20,000 spectators.

In its inaugural 1996 season, PSG RL fielded a squad comprising both French and overseas players and contested the first match in Super League history, defeating the Sheffield Eagles 30–24 in front of nearly 18,000 spectators, the largest rugby league crowd in France in several decades. Despite a promising start, the club's form declined, and it finished 11th of 12 teams with three wins and one draw. The season was affected by administrative instability and logistical challenges, including disputes over the release of players loaned from French clubs.

For the 1997 season, financial backing from News Corp Australia secured the club's participation in the 1997 Super League and enabled players to be based full-time in Paris. The squad composition shifted toward overseas recruitment, significantly reducing French representation. PSG RL recorded several notable results, including a 30–28 home victory over Wigan Warriors, and competed in the 1997 Challenge Cup, the 1997 World Club Championship, and the 1997 Rugby League Premiership before again finishing 11th in the league standings.

The club ceased operations later in 1997 following financial difficulties, declining attendances, and administrative issues. A dispute concerning the employment status of foreign players further affected the club, and support from the Rugby Football League (RFL) was withdrawn. PSG RL was formally dissolved on 3 November 1997, bringing to a close a short-lived but ambitious attempt to establish a professional rugby league presence in the French capital.

== History ==
=== Creation and PSG partnership ===
In 1994, veteran rugby union executive Jacques Fouroux, having lost his political support within the French Rugby Federation (FRF), switched codes and announced the creation of France Rugby League (FRL). Conceived as a summer rugby league tour for regional teams, the competition was staged between seasons of the long-established French Rugby League Championship and aimed to expand the sport beyond its traditional heartlands. The initiative bore similarities—albeit on a more modest scale—to media mogul Rupert Murdoch's proposed Super League. Rugby Football League (RFL) chairman Maurice Lindsay publicly supported the project and, in February 1995, identified Fouroux as the ideal figure to lead the RFL's expansion into France.

Fouroux already had close ties with the French media company Canal+, the owners of Paris Saint-Germain FC. At the time, under the leadership of Charles Biétry, PSG was seeking to establish itself as a multisport club in the tradition of Stade Français or Racing Club de France, maintaining active sections in handball, judo, volleyball, boxing, and basketball. Leveraging its strong brand recognition and established connections within the broadcasting industry, Fouroux identified PSG as the ideal platform for his ambitions. A second team based in Toulouse was considered, but it was ultimately decided to focus the limited resources of French rugby on Paris. This decision generated discontent among several traditional clubs in southern France.

Led by Fouroux, Paris Saint-Germain Rugby League was officially announced as PSG's newest department on 23 December 1995. With the backing of Canal+, Lindsay, and Murdoch, the club joined the newly formed Super League—then composed exclusively of English teams—for its inaugural 1996 season. As a result, the FRL was repositioned as a developmental circuit for PSG Rugby League, with its Paris–Île-de-France team renamed PSG Espoirs. The alliance also produced a landmark three-year broadcasting agreement with Canal+.

The team, based at Stade Sébastien Charléty, was assembled rapidly. Veteran French manager Michel Mazaré and his assistant, Englishman David Ellis, were appointed within two weeks of one another in December 1995. Fouroux assumed the role of club president, while Tas Baitieri—a France-based Australian former player turned executive with extensive experience acting as an intermediary between his adopted country and English rugby league authorities—was named football manager. Baitieri was permitted to work for PSG while remaining employed by the Australian Rugby League Commission (ARL). The entire PSG Rugby League organization was established in just eight months, from conception to competitive debut—a pace Baitieri later compared unfavourably with the three years typically afforded to an ARL expansion franchise.

=== Inaugural season and Super League debut ===
PSG's squad for their 1996 Super League season consisted of seventeen French players and eleven foreign players: six Australians, one New Zealander, one Moldovan, Tongan Kava Utoikamanu, the first Polish player to compete in the Super League, Grzegorz Kacała, and Englishman Darren Adams. With the exception of Utoikamanu and Adams, all players were loaned from clubs competing in the French championship, which resulted in persistent scheduling conflicts. French clubs were often unwilling to grant PSG full release of their players, forcing them to either play for multiple teams in the same period or miss matches altogether. In addition, as most French championship clubs were based in southern France, PSG players trained in Toulouse and were frequently shuttled between the city, their parent clubs, and whichever venue PSG were playing at that week.

On 26 March 1996, the squad was presented to PSG supporters during the football team's UEFA Cup Winners' Cup quarter-final against Parma at the Parc des Princes. PSG Rugby League played their first official match on 29 March 1996 against the Sheffield Eagles at Stade Charléty. It was both the first match in Super League history and the first rugby league fixture held in Paris since 1972. Mazaré's team made an ideal start. With the score level at half-time, Paris took the lead after the break when Renaud Cervello intercepted a pass and ran 80 metres to score in the 65th minute. Cervello added a second try five minutes later to secure a 30–24 victory for the home side. Former Eagle Frédéric Banquet scored the first try in the history of both PSG and the Super League, while Pierre Chamorin served as team captain. The match attracted 17,873 spectators, the largest crowd for a rugby league match in France in 38 years.

Two wins and a draw from their opening five matches initially generated optimism, but a disastrous end to the season followed. PSG were brought back down to earth by a 76–8 thrashing away to the Wigan Warriors, which triggered an eleven-match losing streak. Mazaré was replaced by the rising English coach John Kear, under whom the club recorded its third and final win of the season against the London Broncos, before suffering a further six consecutive defeats. With only three wins and one draw from 22 matches, PSG narrowly avoided relegation, finishing 11th with seven points, ahead of bottom-placed Workington Town, who accrued five points. This outcome was, however, in line with management's pre-season projections.

PSG Rugby League were also affected by instability at the administrative level. Midway through the season, in June 1996, the club lost two of its founding figures, Fouroux and Baitieri, leaving various RFL and French Rugby League Federation executives to compete for control as the logistical and financial shortcomings of Fouroux's original plan became increasingly apparent. Baitieri was recalled to Australia to work for the ARL, while Fouroux resigned from the presidency and returned to rugby union, quickly rejoining his hometown club, Auch Gers. Fouroux was succeeded as president by FRL head Jacques Larrose. The club's instability and uncertain business model fueled speculation that it would be relocated to Toulouse for the following season. Attendance figures also declined, although not to the extent typically experienced by a traditional, gate-driven club.

Kear was offered the chance to remain as head coach but declined, citing concerns that the organization's logistical structure was not conducive to on-field performance. The club was only able to complete the season through additional financial support from Super League backer News Corp Australia, which left its relationship with parent organization PSG strained. In parallel, the promised television coverage quickly disappeared from Canal+'s schedule. Despite these difficulties, the team survived into the following season, albeit at the cost of a reorganization that moved it further away from its developmental objectives, as the club ceased to rely on French players and instead recruited Australians.

=== Second season and World Cup ===
Under the presidency of Larrose, the club faced a budget shortfall and came close to not taking part in the 1997 Super League (UK) season. News Corp Australia subsequently increased its financial support, securing the team's participation and announcing that it would cover the cost of players remaining in Paris on a full-time basis, unlike the previous season. According to Lindsay, PSG also committed to assisting with the marketing of its rugby league section and to providing greater exposure on Canal+.

The proportion of domestic players in the squad decreased sharply, due both to pressure from the RFL for improved results and to diminishing cooperation from established French clubs, which were increasingly reluctant to loan their players to a Paris-based side perceived as artificially supported. Combined with Australian head coach Peter Mulholland's preference for Australian players, this resulted in only three French players—Chamorin, Fabien Devecchi, and Pascal Bomati—being included in the PSG squad. Of the 22 foreign players recruited (21 Australians and one New Zealander), only two—Australians Deon Bird and Jason Sands—had been part of the team the previous season.

PSG Rugby League held its main training camp in Australia until the end of January 1997 before travelling to the United Kingdom to participate in the 1997 Challenge Cup in February. The team made its debut in the knockout competition with a victory over second-tier Batley Bulldogs, before being eliminated in the following round by fellow Super League side Salford Red Devils. In both matches, PSG did not field a single French player. As in the previous Super League season, PSG began their league campaign with an opening-day win, defeating the Eagles 18–4 away from home. However, the triumph proved short-lived, as the team immediately embarked on an eight-game losing streak, which led to the dismissal of Mulholland on 5 May 1997.

Australian David Miles, a former assistant to Mulholland, served as interim head coach, guiding PSG to a victory over bottom-placed Castleford Tigers to halt their losing streak before losing his second match against Sheffield. The team was then taken over by former Great Britain international Andy Goodway, who had recently been released as manager of relegation-threatened Oldham. Following Super League defeats to the Broncos and Wigan in late May, Goodway's squad participated in the 1997 World Club Championship in June, a competition envisioned by Murdoch that included all teams from the European Super League and the Australian Super League.

The Parisians began their World Championship campaign on a relatively positive note, taking an early lead against Australian side Hunter Mariners before ultimately losing, and then achieving a surprising 24–0 victory over the Australian Western Reds at Stade Charléty. In July, PSG travelled to Australia for the return leg of the tournament, where they suffered defeats in both matches. Despite these losses, the team's lone victory was sufficient to advance to the playoffs, where they were eliminated by St Helens. Goodway chose to rest key players during the tournament to prioritize avoiding relegation in the Super League.

In July 1997, with PSG languishing at the bottom of the Super League table and home attendances declining sharply, the team produced its most impressive results of the season, registering three wins in five matches. A victory away to the Halifax Panthers was followed by back-to-back home wins—against Wigan and Halifax—for the first time in the club's history. PSG staged a remarkable comeback against Wigan, overturning a 14-point deficit in the final thirteen minutes to secure a 30–28 upset, marking their first Super League home victory of the season. The club ultimately secured its Super League status in its final home match of the season, defeating relegation rivals Oldham at Stade Charléty to finish 11th once again. PSG's appearance in the 1997 Rugby League Premiership on 7 September 1997 was the team's final fixture. They were defeated 6–48 by Salford, with Devecchi scoring the team's last-ever try.

=== Scandal and dissolution ===
The end of the season was marked by a highly-publicized scandal. Following the club's shock victory over Wigan, two club officials, the Dabe brothers, in dispute with the Super League, reported that the majority of the players - mostly Australians - lacked proper employment contracts and were instead playing on tourist visas to avoid certain taxes in France. With profitability at an all-time low, attendances falling to between two and three thousand, and a controversy that damaged the reputation of the still-nascent Super League, the RFL was hesitant to continue supporting the Parisian project. Disengaged from the rugby league heartland in the south of the country, PSG RL was probably doomed from the start. In early September 1997, Goodway met with RFL officials to discuss a potential return to the team in 1998. His demands focused on better availability of French players and more games played in the south. However, during the Super League's end-of-season meeting, spokesman Peter Rowe acknowledged that "the future of Paris is causing some concern".

Maurice Lindsay said that a demotion to the second tier, which he felt would be more in line with the Paris market's short-term prospects, would be considered. A rumor had circulated during the season that the RFL, which had long desired a club in Newcastle, would solve both problems by moving PSG there in 1998. That did not prove to be the case and on 3 November 1997, it was announced that second tier runners-up Huddersfield Giants had been promoted to Super League, while PSG was disbanded due to the financial burden it represented for the British clubs and poor interactions with French rugby league authorities. At its worst, the club had been hemorrhaging £50,000 a week. During PSG's second season, the RFL and Lindsay, desperate for the experiment to succeed, sent his deputy, Robert Elstone and chief administrator, Harry Jepson, to Paris to try to save the club, and covered £200,000 worth of the team's expenses. According Lindsay, had it not been for the pressure of the British clubs, the RFL would have eagerly entered Paris for a third Super League campaign.

== Grounds ==
The team's regular home ground was Stade Sébastien Charléty in Paris, France, which has a capacity of 20,000 spectators. Paris Saint-Germain Rugby League played their first match at the venue on 29 March 1996 against the Sheffield Eagles, in front of a club-record crowd of 17,873. The stadium was shared with French rugby union club Paris UC.

During the 1996 season, with many players loaned from French championship clubs largely based in southern France, PSG RL trained at the CREPS de Toulouse, a sports institute in Toulouse. As the players had no permanent residence in Paris, they stayed in a hotel for home matches and were regularly shuttled to away fixtures. For the 1997 season, increased financial backing from Super League sponsor News Corp Australia enabled players to be based full time with PSG, training and living at a sports resort located just west of Paris.

Over their two seasons of existence, PSG played 24 home matches, recording seven wins, one draw, and sixteen losses. Of these fixtures, 22 were held at Stade Sébastien Charléty, where the club registered six wins, one draw, and fifteen defeats. The remaining two home matches were staged in southern France: one in Narbonne against the Halifax Panthers on 9 August 1997, and another in Bayonne against the Warrington Wolves on 16 August 1997, which coincided with the Fêtes de Bayonne, a major regional festival. PSG defeated Halifax but lost to Warrington.

The decision to relocate two or three fixtures had been taken during the off-season, as August was considered a commercially slow period in Paris due to many residents leaving the capital for summer holidays. Using the team as a touring attraction, following the model of France Rugby League (FRL), had been an objective of founder Jacques Fouroux since the club's inception. PSG were also required to stage their two 1997 Challenge Cup fixtures in the United Kingdom, as Stade Sébastien Charléty was unavailable at the time. Although a permanent move away from the venue was considered, Charléty was ultimately secured for the remainder of the season.

== Legacy ==
=== Effects on English clubs ===
Rugby Football League (RFL) chief executive Maurice Lindsay devised the Super League, a new competition intended to feature clubs from major cities across Europe, with financial backing of £87 million from media mogul Rupert Murdoch, who also envisioned the creation of a global rugby league championship under his broadcasting control. Paris Saint-Germain Rugby League were granted a place in the competition for the 1996 season in order to provide the British game's top tier with a French and wider European presence. However, their inclusion had significant consequences for the existing league structure and its member clubs.

The new 12-team Super League replaced the former 16-team First Division. PSG RL and the London Broncos, who had finished fourth in the Second Division, were admitted to the top flight, while clubs finishing below 10th place in the First Division—such as Featherstone Rovers, Wakefield Trinity, Hull F.C. and Widnes Vikings—were excluded. Keighley Cougars, who had won the Second Division and would otherwise have been promoted, were also denied entry. Featherstone did not return to the top flight, while Hull later experienced financial collapse and merged with Newcastle Thunder, an outcome that had long-term effects on rugby league in north-east England.

=== Dragons and Toulouse ===
PSG's victory over Sheffield in the inaugural Super League match was a notable moment for rugby league in France, demonstrating that a French team could compete in the top flight and attract significant support. The match also contributed to the Super League’s European image and is considered a factor in the eventual inclusion of French clubs Catalans Dragons and Toulouse Olympique in the competition.

Following the Paris experiment, French Rugby League Federation president Jean-Paul Ferré proposed the creation of a new team as part of a 1999 Super League expansion. Paris was briefly considered, but Toulouse emerged as the preferred location. Neither option materialized at the time, although the opportunity reopened in 2002 when French clubs were invited to apply for a Super League licence. Catalans Dragons, based in Perpignan, were selected and debuted in 2006, while Toulouse Olympique joined the league 20 years later, in 2026.

The experience gained by PSG players in the Super League was credited with helping their subsequent French clubs, including Catalans, adjust to top-flight competition. PSG's promotional approach under Jacques Fouroux was also seen as a precursor to the marketing strategies later employed by rugby union side Stade Français under Max Guazzini. Additionally, the club became the first in the RFL system to appoint a woman, Rebecca Cove, to a managerial role.

=== Business model ===
PSG Rugby League sought to expand rugby league beyond its traditional audience, targeting a more casual spectator base. The club emphasized the entertainment value of matchdays, featuring pre-match shows with pyrotechnics and musical performances. To maximize attendance, many tickets were distributed free of charge or offered as incentives to sponsors for customer promotions. The strategy relied on large crowds, amplified by expected television coverage from Canal+, the owner of parent club Paris Saint-Germain FC, to attract corporate sponsors and achieve financial viability.

Early attendance figures were promising, and the strategy received praise, with Bradford Bulls chairman Chris Caisley noting that PSG RL was the only club aside from his own to genuinely attempt to meet Super League aspirations. However, the club was launched without major corporate sponsorship, and the partnership with Paris Saint-Germain provided little financial security, as the team was not owned by the football club. Canal+'s involvement was limited, and promised television coverage rarely extended beyond highlights packages.

Ultimately, PSG RL failed to develop a sustainable network of corporate partners, with much of the ticket distribution handled through public institutions, and most financial losses were absorbed by Murdoch and the RFL. In October 1997, RFL chairman Rodney Walker stated that the league would no longer subsidize PSG, as the club had failed to generate sufficient income independently. While the team avoided relegation on the field, it lacked the financial foundation to continue and was dissolved in November 1997. Former PSG player Laurent Lucchese noted that, although the club helped promote rugby league and provided television exposure at Stade Sébastien Charléty, a team without roots and local support could not endure, suggesting a southern location might have offered greater sustainability.

== Statistics ==
=== Seasons ===
As of 1997 season.

Winners Runners-up Promoted Relegated

Season	League		CC	WCC	RLP	MP	W	D	L	PF	PA	PD	WP%	Attendance	Top point scorers														
Season	1996	SL	CC	WCC	RLP	MP	W	D	L	PF	PA	PD	WP%	Attendance	11th	—N/a	—N/a	—N/a	22	3	1	18	398	795	−397	13.64	8,026	(France) Patrick Torreilles	54
1997	SL	11th	Fifth round	Elimination qualifier	Preliminary round	30	8	0	22	462	766	−304	26.67	5,201	(Australia) Matt O'Connor	70													

=== Competitive record ===
As of 1997 season.

Competition	MP	W	D	L	PF	PA	PD	WP%
Super League	44	9	1	34	760	1,367	−607	20.45
Challenge Cup	2	1	0	1	42	12	+30	50.00
World Club Challenge	5	1	0	4	52	134	−82	20.00
Rugby League Premiership	1	0	0	1	6	48	−42	0.00
Total	52	11	1	40	860	1,561	−701	21.15

== Notable players ==
As of 1997 season.

=== Captains ===
No.	Player	Captaincy	Source
1	(France) Pierre Chamorin	1996	
2	(Australia) David O'Donnell	1997	

=== Most points ===
Rank	Player	Position	Paris Saint-Germain	Points
1	(Australia) Matt O'Connor	Five-eighth, Halfback	1997	70
2	(Australia) Deon Bird	Fullback, Centre, Loose forward, Wing	1996–1997	64
3	(New Zealand) Phil Bergman	Stand-off	1997	64
4	(Australia) Jeremy Robinson	Centre, Five-eighth	1997	60
5	(France) Patrick Torreilles	Centre, Stand-off	1996	54
6	(France) Pascal Bomati	Stand-off, Centre, Wing	1996	40
7	(France) Pierre Chamorin	Centre, Stand-off	1996–1997	38
8	(France) Frédéric Banquet	Fullback, Wing, Centre	1996	36
9	(Australia) Jamie Olejnik	Centre	1997	36
10	(England) Paul Evans	Wing, Centre, Halfback, Hooker	1997	36

=== Most appearances ===
Rank	Player	Position	Paris Saint-Germain	Appearances
1	(Australia) Deon Bird	Fullback, Centre, Loose forward, Wing	1996–1997	37
2	(France) Pierre Chamorin	Centre, Stand-off	1996–1997	34
3	(France) Fabien Devecchi	Scrum-half	1996–1997	31
4	(Australia) Jason Sands	Prop	1996–1997	31
5	(New Zealand) Phil Bergman	Stand-off	1997	29
6	(France) Didier Cabestany	Prop	1996–1997	29
7	(Australia) David O'Donnell	Hooker	1997	28
8	(New Zealand) David Lomax	Prop	1997	27
9	(Australia) Adam Peters	Second-row	1997	25
10	(England) Paul Evans	Wing, Centre, Halfback, Hooker	1997	25

== Personnel ==
=== Presidents ===
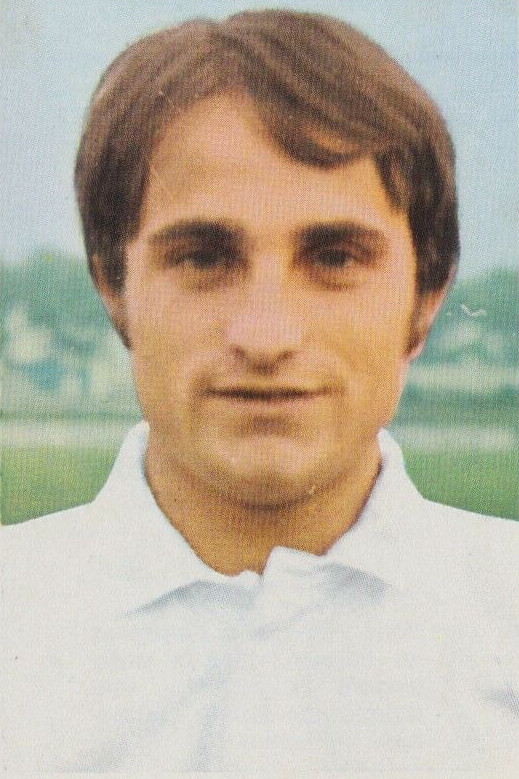
Jacques Fouroux

No.	President	Tenure	Source
1	(France) Jacques Fouroux	Dec. 1995 – Jun. 1996	
2	(France) Jacques Larrose	Jun. 1996 – Nov. 1997	

=== Managers ===
No.	Manager	Tenure	M	W	D	L	PF	PA	PD	Win %	Source
1	(France) Michel Mazaré	Dec. 1995 – Jul. 1996	15	2	1	12	288	582	−294	13.33	
2	(England) John Kear	Jul. 1996 – Aug. 1996	7	1	0	6	110	213	−103	14.29	
3	(Australia) Peter Mulholland	Aug. 1996 – May 1997	11	2	0	9	192	260	−68	18.18	
4	(Australia) David Miles	May 1997	2	1	0	1	27	40	−13	50.00	
5	(England) Andy Goodway	May 1997 – Nov. 1997	17	5	0	12	251	467	−216	29.41	
