= David O'Donnell (rugby league) =

Australian rugby league footballer

Personal information
- Full name: David O'Donnell
- Born: 6 April 1968 (age 56); Sydney, New South Wales, Australia

Playing information
- Position: Hooker
Club
Years	Team	Pld	T	G	FG	P
1989–94	Manly Sea Eagles	81	4	0	0	16
1995	Sydney City Roosters	7	0	0	0	0
1995–96	London Broncos	10	0	0	0	0
1997	Paris Saint-Germain	21	5	0	0	20
	Total	119	9	0	0	36
- Source: As of 23 January 2023

David O'Donnell (born 6 April 1968) is an Australian former professional rugby league footballer who played in the 1980s and 1990s. He played for the Manly Warringah Sea Eagles and Sydney City Roosters in the NSWRL/ARL competitions. He also played for Paris Saint-Germain and the London Broncos in the Super League.

== Playing career ==
O'Donnell was signed by Manly in 1989. He made his first grade debut for Manly in round 20 of the 1989 NSWRL season against the Penrith Panthers at Penrith Stadium. O'Donnell played over 80 matches for Manly including three of the clubs finals campaigns. He was released by Manly at the end of the 1994 season.

In 1995, O'Donnell joined the Sydney City Roosters but was limited to only seven games that season. O'Donnell later had stints with the London Broncos and Paris Saint-Germain in the Super League.
