= France Rugby League =

French rugby league competition

- Sport: Rugby league
- Founded: 1995; 31 years ago
- Founder: Jacques Fouroux
- Folded: 1996; 30 years ago
- President: Jacques Larrose
- No. of teams: 8 (inaugural season)
- Country: France
- Most titles: Toulouse–Midi-Pyrénées (2 titles)

France Rugby League (in French in the original) was a French rugby league competition which took place in 1995 and 1996. The brainchild of former rugby union star Jacques Fouroux, it was an attempt to market the younger code to a casual audience, as a summer tour contested by regional select teams between seasons of France's regular club championship. The first edition received some positive reviews, but the long term viability of its business model remained unclear, and it was quickly eclipsed by the expansion of Rupert Murdoch's Super League to the French market.

== Founding ==
France Rugby League was established by Jacques Fouroux, former captain and manager of the French national rugby union team, and former vice-president of the French Rugby (Union) Federation (FFR). According to Fouroux, the league's impetus was a conversation with former South African international Morné du Plessis ahead of the 1995 Rugby Union World Cup. Both expressed the desire for a new, more elitist club competition that would usher rugby into the professional era and pick the interest of the wider public beyond the temporary boost provided by that tournament. However, after prematurely siding with the wrong faction during the FFR's 1991 election campaign, Fouroux had lost much of his political clout within French rugby union, whose establishment remained ostensibly attached to amateurism. He thus decided to switch codes and move to rugby league, where he felt he could find more support for his vision.

Fouroux presented his new venture to the press in a press conference held in Paris on 7 November 1994. Also participating were Maurice Lindsay, CEO of the Rugby Football League and Australia's Ken Arthurson, chairman of the International Rugby League Board. While some chalked Fouroux's sudden conversion from union down to political ambition, his prestige and the sport's yearning for a national footprint easily trumped those concerns within the French rugby league community. Upon his re-election at the head of the French Rugby League Federation (FFRXIII) on 25 February 1995 in Carcassonne, president Jean-Paul Ferré announced the impending creation—then slated for 11 Match 1995—of the new administrative body required by Fouroux's circuit.

France Rugby League's statutes were eventually approved during a federal assembly held on 25 May 1995 in Villeneuve-sur-Lot. The vote was unanimous in favor of its creation. Fouroux was named as FRL's manager. Jacques Larrose, a veteran union executive with Stade Rochelais and former league player with Lavardac, was appointed president. Fouroux also trademarked the title Rugby League Magazine for a potential print publication, and even registered the brand "Rugby League Café" for a potential chain of sports bars. Trademarks for these and for the some ancillary rights to the France Rugby League property were owned by Fauroux' company, Auch-based JFX Événements.

=== Rugby union reaction ===
Due to FRL's lofty ambitions, there was some speculation as to whether some of the country's amateur rugby union stars would cross the line to play in it. In the run-up to its official announcement, Fouroux hinted that veterans Franck Mesnel and Laurent Rodriguez, both close friends of his, were interested parties. On 3 May 1995, the tour announced its first marquee hire, as France rugby union international fr:Thierry Devergie (FC Grenoble) signed for the team then identified as Lyon–Villeurbanne. FRL's proclamation of statutes was attended by several union names, including the aforementioned Rodriguez, Bernard Laporte and Bernard Lacombe (who would switch to league full time for several seasons).

The FFR (rugby union) was critical of the project, with its president Bernard Lapasset saying: "I want to be the president of a federation that caters to responsible men, who we prepare for and launch into professional life. Producing rugbymen who will be motivated by the commercial contracts they get from their club or federation, I don't think that is very healthy." RC Nîmes president Louis Gagnières reiterated that "there is only one rugby" and added: "Guys are attached to their club. They may go and make a few coins in league, of which they'll have to pay a lot in taxes, but I'm not sure they would be making the right choice." Ultimately, the number of union defectors remained modest.

According to contemporary press reports, some rugby union strongholds were pressured by the FFR into refusing to host FRL games. In particular, Béziers mayor Pierre Couderc denounced an agreement between his deputy mayor for sports and FRL to host the 1995 final at Stade de la Méditerranée, banning the tour from the venue. The game was moved to Carcassonne, already a tried-and-true league town.

== Format ==
=== Schedule ===
Fouroux' motto for his new league was "understandable by all, and spectacular all the time". Fouroux quickly decided on a tour operating in the summer, with teams mostly playing on neutral ground, which would allow to introduce the game to as many new markets as possible. Another bold move was to make admission free in an effort to reach broader demographics, which drew raised eyebrows from the press. Tickets were sold to public and private corporate partners, who would then distribute them to their own patrons.

The preliminary plan presented in November 1994 called for sixteen teams, each representing a region and bearing the name of a corporate sponsor in lieu of a nickname. However, prior to Rupert Murdoch's commitment, Fouroux remained FRL's only significant financier. He also expressed interest in a number of large or non-traditional rugby markets, which expanded up to northern cities like Strasbourg and Reims, due to the latter having recently lost its professional soccer team. By the time FRL was approved by the French federation in May 1995, the number of teams had been reduced to eight.

=== Game presentation ===
FRL's presentation was largely inspired by the Australian Rugby League, as evidenced by its jersey designs, which were patterned after those worn by ARL clubs. It aimed to sell the rugby action as part of a broader entertainment package, which included musical performances by artists well known to the general French public at the time, such as Rozlyne Clarke and Zouk Machine.

=== Rules ===
Fouroux also felt that the sport of rugby union itself was in need of a retooling, saying: "[In rugby union] we are dinosaurs. [...] A scrum moves an inch, and we find extraordinary, geedy pleasure in it. But who likes it, aside from us, coaches and players?" Although Fouroux always intended to place more emphasis on the running game, he originally envisioned a hybrid sport, which he called it "not quite rugby league". However, after being invited by FFRXIII president Jean-Pierre Ferré to attend a 13-man game at Wembley Stadium, he was so impressed with the game's speed that he opted to play rugby league outright, with only minor tweaks to that code's established ruleset.

Tweaks were chiefly made with the aim of making the sport television friendly. Some innovations were drawn from North American sports. Each team carried four alternate players, who could get in whenever they wanted in an effort to keep the action more intense, which was compared to ice hockey. Playing time was also divided in four quarters like in american football, which was acknowledged as a way to squeeze in more commercial time.

Game staff was also beefed up to increase the pace of play. In addition to the standard three officials, one was added behind each goal line to expedite the decision process and cut down on disputes with players. The number of ball boys positioned around the field was brought up to ten, in order to immediately provide players with a new ball after one went out of bounds.

=== Media ===
Youth-oriented national radio network Fun Radio signed on as the tour's media partner. Upstart over-the-air channel M6 was rumored to be in talks for the television rights at an early stage. Ultimately, the first edition's final was shown on premium channel Canal+, the broadcaster of Fouroux's exhibition rugby union team, the French Barbarians, and the parent company of Paris Saint-Germain FC.

== Seasons ==
=== 1995 ===
The eight inaugural teams, split across two pools, were: Avignon–Provence, Bordeaux–Aquitaine, Carcassonne–Aude–Languedoc, Lyon–Rhône-Alpes, Marseille–Méditerranée, Paris–Île-de-France, Perpignan–Roussillon–Catalogne and Toulouse–Midi-Pyrénées. While several teams carried the names of large cities Fouroux was interested in, most games were played in smaller towns, often rugby league strongholds. Only Villeurbanne near Lyon, which hosted half of the semifinal series, qualified as a bonafide major market. The first season, initially tabbed for July 1995, kicked off on 10 August 1995 in Perpignan and lasted seven weeks. The budget was capped at 300,000 francs per team for this trial run, with hopes of rising it to 1,000,000 francs if revenue projections aligned. The players were accepting of the strict cap as they were eager to help the tour reach a new audience.

==== Arrival of the Super League ====
Around 1994, Australian-American media mogul Rupert Murdoch became the principal backer of a projected Australasian rugby league circuit, the Super League, which aimed to supplant the longstanding Australian Rugby League (the two would ultimately merge as the National Rugby League). Additionally, Murdoch desired to have an equivalent competition in Europe, so that the top teams of both hemispheres could be matched in a world final. Thus a sister organization, Super League (Europe), was pitched to the game's European brass and quickly gained the support of England's Rugby Football League. As Fouroux's own loop was modeled after the Australasian club circuit, he was another logical partner for Murdoch's new European operation.

Before France Rugby League had even played its first game, it was already in negotiations with Murdoch and Paris Saint-Germain FC for the creation of a France-based Super League team. As FRL's frontman, Fouroux received the presidency of the new PSG Rugby League, and the organization appointed Michel Mazaré as the team's manager on 16 December 1995 during a federal assembly in Albi. In effect, the team would act as a nationwide select team, with France Rugby League's regional teams as a transitional step between it and the grassroot clubs. PSG RL was actually projected to become a touring team representing the whole of France in year two.

=== 1996 ===
The second season saw two of FRL's 1995 teams, Avignon–Provence and Lyon–Rhône-Alpes, omitted from the line-up. Early schedules listed a pair of new teams billed from Casablanca, Morocco and Barcelona, Spain, as part of the league, but there is no indication that they actually played. Paris was also slated to make its debut as a host location.

As both were summer leagues, the second season of France Rugby League coincided with the Super League's inaugural campaign, with Paris Saint-Germain's Super League squad taking precedence over selections for France Rugby League's regional teams. Meanwhile, the Paris–Île-de-France team playing in France Rugby League was renamed as PSG Espoirs Île-de-France ('PSG Île-de-France Prospects').

Ultimately, FRL's expected growth did not materialize in year two and the addition of the Superleague team did not nothing to help its profile. With his financial model under scrutiny, Fouroux resigned from his duties with both PSG and FRL on 1 September 1996, returning to rugby union soon after. FRL did not play another season, and its president Jacques Larrose succeeded Fouroux at the helm of PSG RL.

== Champions and runner-ups ==
Season	Champions	Score	Finalists	Venue	Attendance
1995	Toulouse–Midi-Pyrénées	16–14	Perpignan–Roussillon–Catalogne	Stade Albert-Domec, Carcassonne	9,000
1996	Toulouse–Midi-Pyrénées	?–?	Marseille–Méditerranée	?	?

== Revival attempts ==
The concept of a summer league made up of regional teams and geared towards the general public was considered for a reboot on two occasions. In 2012, veteran sports executive fr:Luc Dayan, who had worked with PSG during its rugby league experiment and kept an affinity for the game, was commissioned by then FFRXIII president Nicolas Larrat to revive it. However, a regime change at the federation saw his successor Carlos Zalduendo prioritize a return of his club Toulouse Olympique to the RFL system, and the project was put on hold.

In 2017, new federation president Marc Palanques brought Dayan back to produce an updated version of the project. Now tentatively named "Super XIII", it called for thirteen teams representing France's twelve mainland regions plus Corsica. The following monikers were proposed: Auvergne-Rhône-Alpes Montagnards ('Mountaineers'), Bourgogne-Franche-Comté Guerriers ('Warriors'), Brittany Menhirs, Centre-Val de Loire Ogres, Corsica Pirates, Grand-Est Sangliers ('Wildhogs'), Hauts-de-France Tisonniers ('Fire Irons'), Île-de-France Parigots (slang for 'Parisians'), Normandy Cavaliers, Nouvelle-Aquitaine Vignerons ('Winemakers'), Occitania Ours ('Bears'), Pays de la Loire Sentinelles ('Sentinels') and Provence-Alpes-Côte d'Azur Aigles ('Eagles').

The necessary budget to get the league going was estimated to €15 million. The FFRXIII entered talks with Provale, the French professional rugby union players' association, offering its less experienced membership to join the competition on a developmental basis during the union off-season, thus adding depth to its talent pool at a moderate cost. However, according to Luc Dayan, Ligue Nationale de Rugby president Paul Goze immediately vetoed the idea when approached, telling him: "Don't even try convincing me. As long as I live, this won't happen." The project has since gone under the radar again, although whether this was the primary reason for its failure is unclear.

== See also ==
- Rugby league in France
- French Rugby League Championship
- French rugby league system
