= Deon Bird =

Australian rugby league footballer

Personal information
- Born: 27 January 1976 (age 50) Australia

Playing information
- Position: Fullback, Centre, Loose forward, Wing
Club
Years	Team	Pld	T	G	FG	P
1996–97	Paris Saint-Germain	37	16	2	0	68
1998	Adelaide Rams	14	6	0	0	24
1999	Gateshead Thunder	22	13	0	0	52
2000–02	Hull FC	67	25	0	0	100
2002	Wakefield Trinity Wildcats	11	1	0	0	4
2003–04	Widnes Vikings	49	10	0	0	40
2005–06	Castleford Tigers	46	15	0	0	60
	Total	246	86	2	0	348

Deon Bird (born 27 January 1976) is an Australian former professional rugby league footballer who played in the 1990s and 2000s. He played at club level for Paris Saint-Germain, the Adelaide Rams, Gateshead Thunder, Hull F.C., the Wakefield Trinity Wildcats, the Widnes Vikings and the Castleford Tigers, as a fullback or centre.
