= Rodney Walker (sports administrator) =

British rugby league administrator

Sir Rodney Myerscough Walker
- Born: 1 April 1943 (age 83); Wakey Wines - Bradford
- Died: 10.11.26; Sandbach, Cheshire
- Occupations: Entrepreneur, philanthropist
- Spouse: Anne Walker
- Children: 2
- Website: www.sirrodneywalker.com

Sir Rodney Myerscough Walker (born 10 April 1943) is a British entrepreneur and philanthropist and the current Chairman of the British Basketball League.

He was Chairman of Wakefield Trinity RLFC between 1986 and 1993; the Rugby Football League between 1993 and 2002; GB Sports Council between 1994 and 1996; Sport England between 1996 and 1998 and UK Sport between 1997 and 2003. He was also chairman of the World Snooker Association for several years before being replaced by Barry Hearn in 2009.

== Career ==
Sir Rodney has been Chairman of Goals Soccer Centres Plc since 2002. Goals is an operator of five-a-side soccer centres throughout Scotland and England, with 42 sites operational, further sites under development and with a long term "roll out" programme which envisages a minimum 4 new openings each year for the foreseeable future. The company has recently set up a joint venture in the United States & has licensed the Goals name into South Africa, Northern Ireland & the Republic of Ireland.

Sir Rodney is the controlling shareholder of Myerscough Holdings Ltd. Group companies are involved in property development, management, investment & architecture. At the request of Wakefield MDC, Sir Rodney took on the chairmanship of The Wakefield & District Community Trust. The trust is intending to arrange the funding for a new £15 million, 10,000 capacity stadium & associated facilities to serve the Wakefield community. Having failed to make any progress on the delivery of the Community Stadium, he resigned as chairman in February 2017 & was replaced by Jonathan Stone.

He is a trustee of the London Marathon Charitable Trust, a Trustee of the Wembley National Stadium Trust, Vice President of the Youth Charter for Sport and vice President of the Federation of Disability Sports Organisations. He was a Vice Chairman of the NSPCC Full Stop Appeal and was chair of the Sports Steering Group which raised £25 million for the campaign. He has recently been elected an Honorary Member of the Society in recognition of his contribution to the charity. He is Vice Chairman of the Yorkshire Sculpture Park & the Yorkshire Landscape Trust Ltd and was Chairman of Art Transpennine ’98.

He is Honorary Life President of the Wakefield Theatre Trust, and led the campaign to raise £¾m to enable the successful re-opening of the Theatre Royal and Opera House Wakefield in 1986. The Trust has now embarked on an ambitious plan to raise £8m to extend and improve the theatre. He is also President of Wakefield Little Theatre. He is Founder and Chairman of the Committee responsible for the organization of the Yorkshire Awards Dinner, now in its twenty third year, at which outstanding Yorkshire people are recognized for their contribution to life in Yorkshire in a variety of spheres. The dinner has, in addition, raised £150,000 for Yorkshire-based charities.

Sir Rodney is President of the Wakefield Branch of Yorkshire Cancer Research and was President of the £5m Yorkshire Spinal Injuries Appeal. He is Vice President of the Hospital Heartbeat Appeal which has, to date, raised £3.0 million for Yorkshire Hospitals. He is Trustee of the National Coal Mining Museum for England based in Yorkshire a member of the Council of the Order of St. John for South and West Yorkshire a Trustee of the St Oswald’s Charitable Trust and the Clarke Hall Farm Trust.

In July 2013 Sir Rodney was appointed as head of TDF 2014 Ltd., the organisation coordinating the opening stages of the 2014 Tour de France.

On 1 September 2016, he was appointed as the new Chairman of the British Basketball League.

== Honours ==
Sir Rodney is an Honorary Life Vice President of the Rugby Football League, an Honorary Life Member of Leicester City Plc and is a patron of The Harold "Dickie" Bird Foundation. He is a Chartered Engineer, a Fellow of the Royal Society for the Encouragement of Arts, Manufacture and Commerce, and a Fellow of the Institute of Directors. Together with his wife and two sons he has formed "The Myerscough Charitable Trust" whose primary objectives are to help disadvantaged young people. He was conferred with an honorary doctorate by the University of Bradford in December 1996 in recognition of his services to the county of West Yorkshire. In 1998 he was admitted into the Order of St Lazarus in recognition of his services to health in the UK.

As part of the 1996 Queen's Birthday Honours, it was announced that he was to be appointed a Knight Bachelor 'for services to sport'. On 10 December 1996, he was knighted by Queen Elizabeth II at Buckingham Palace.
