= Didier Cabestany =

France rugby league & union footballer (1969–2020)

Personal information
- Full name: Didier Yves Marcel Cabestany
- Born: 13 May 1969; Perpignan, Pyrénées-Orientales, France
- Died: 16 February 2020 (aged 50); Claira, France

Playing information

Rugby union
Club
Years	Team	Pld	T	G	FG	P
1990–91	Section Paloise

Rugby league
- Position: Prop
Club
Years	Team	Pld	T	G	FG	P
1991–00	XIII Catalan
1996–97	Paris Saint-Germain	26	2	0	0	8
2000	UTC
	Entente AAP
	Le Barcarès
	Total	26	2	0	0	8
Representative
Years	Team	Pld	T	G	FG	P
1989–97	France	24	2	0	0	8

Didier Cabestany (13 May 1969 – 16 February 2020) was a French professional rugby league footballer who represented France at the 1995 World Cup.

Cabestany played for Paris Saint-Germain in the 1996 and 1997 Super League competitions and later played for UTC.
