= Pascal Bomati =

France international dual-code rugby player

Personal information
- Born: 13 October 1973 (age 53) Perpignan, Pyrénées-Orientales, Occitania, France
- Height: 1.71 m (5 ft 7 1/2 in)
- Weight: 80 kg (12 st 8 lb)

Playing information
- Position: Stand-off, Centre, Wing
Club
Years	Team	Pld	T	G	FG	P
	XIII Catalan
	Paris Saint-Germain
	Total	0	0	0	0	0
Representative
Years	Team	Pld	T	G	FG	P
1992–96	France	7

Rugby union career
- Position: Wing
Senior career
Years	Team	Apps	(Points)
1997–99	CA Brive		
1999–02	Section Paloise		
2002–07	USA Perpignan		
International career
Years	Team	Apps	(Points)
2005	France A	1	
National sevens team
Years	Team		Comps
- France

Pascal Bomati (born 13 October 1973 in Perpignan), is a French former professional rugby league and rugby union footballer. He has played rugby league for France.

Pascal Bomati began playing rugby league at with XIII Catalan, then with Paris Saint-Germain in the Super League. He switched code a first time, playing rugby union for CA Brive where he won the Heineken Cup, in 1997. In 2002 he joined USA Perpignan.

== Honours ==
- Heineken Cup 2003 with CA Brive
- European Challenge Cup 2000 with Section Paloise
- European Challenge Cup finalist 2003 with USA Perpignan
- French rugby champion finalist 2004 (player)
