= Super League war =

Dispute over control of top-flight rugby league in Australia and New Zealand

- Date: 1993-1997
- Location: Australia, New Zealand
- Caused by: Competition and rivalry between the two leagues
- Result: Formation of the National Rugby League (NRL)

Parties
Australian Rugby League (ARL); Supported by: Optus Vision	Super League; Supported by: News Corporation

Lead figures
(Australia) Kerry Packer	(Australia) Rupert Murdoch

The Super League war was a commercial competition between the Australian Rugby League (ARL) and the Australian Super League to establish pre-eminence in professional rugby league competition in Australia and New Zealand in the mid-1990s.

Super League, backed by Rupert Murdoch and News Corporation, competed with the ARL, supported by Kerry Packer and Optus Vision, in and out of court for broadcasting rights and supremacy in the sport. Super League had attracted several clubs disenchanted with the existing administration, and introduced two new clubs, as it attempted to establish itself as the dominant competition. After much legal action, when the ARL tried to block the new league, Super League ran one season parallel to the ARL's in 1997. At the conclusion of that season a peace deal was reached and the two leagues united to form the National Rugby League, which continues today.

== Background ==
=== Early rumblings of Super League and the Bradley Report ===
Titled "Super League a must " the October 4, 1984 edition of Rugby League Week featured an interview with then Queensland Rugby League chairman Ron McAuliffe. In the interview with Tony Durkin, Ron McAuliffe brought to light a proposal to expand the then NSWRL competition with several new teams. McAuliffe's plans were for what he described as a "Super League" with 12 clubs from across NSW and Queensland across two divisions, with a system of relegation and promotion.

"From my point of view, the thoughts are preliminary at this stage," he said."It has yet to be discussed with the NSW League and the ARL. But it will happen, I've no doubt about that." McAuliffe was also noncommittal about the number of teams which would take part in such a competition, but he thought 12 would be an ideal number. "But if there are 12, it won't necessarily mean eight from Sydney and four from Brisbane," he said."And it won't necessarily be one single club. The way I see it, there is going to be much ground sharing and club sharing in the future." He continued "In fact, I can foresee club amalgamations in both Brisbane and Sydney." On 9 April 1992, A blueprint for the expansion of Rugby League was tabled by the Premiership Policy Committee of the NSWRL, followed in August by an Organisation Review, by Dr G. Bradley, which was distributed to the premiership clubs. The Bradley Report, as it became known, was central to the ARL replacing the NSWRL as the governing body of the premiership. The report concluded that:

...to reduce the number of clubs in Sydney, will be very hard for the League to implement given the long playing traditions of some of those clubs. In the long term, however, it is likely that Sydney is not going to be able to support eleven clubs as it does at present. Therefore in the long term this is the only viable solution. Sydney based clubs are going to have to move to new areas, merge or be relegated from the League. This is going to be a painful process. In the long term I believe that the ARL should be looking to reduce the number of clubs in the National Competition to fourteen, thus allowing clubs to play two complete rounds. This will mean, assuming that only four new clubs are admitted from areas outside Sydney, that there will be only five clubs based in Sydney.

Each club received a letter of invitation for the 1995 season on 2 May 1994. Included were a number of admission criteria including the ability to "attract a minimum average home attendance of 10,000 people". Balmain, Easts, Gold Coast, Illawarra, Parramatta, Penrith, Souths, St George and Wests failed this criterion for 1995 . After the privately owned Brisbane Broncos transferred a 20% share of their company to Northern Rivers Ltd, the new shareholders received the following:

Under the terms of the League's Constitution, it is necessary that, without exception, all clubs which wish to participate in the League's Premiership competition, must apply each year for admission. No club has any automatic right to participate in any year's competition and the League has the unfettered right to reject any club's application for participation.

== The Super League war ==
=== Proposals for a breakaway competition ===
In 1993, after a dispute over sponsorship (the Queensland Rugby League was sponsored by Brisbane-based brewery Castlemaine Perkins (XXXX) while the Broncos were sponsored by rival brewery Powers), the Broncos had moved out of the 32,500 capacity Lang Park and into the almost 60,000 capacity ANZ Stadium (the main venue of the 1982 Commonwealth Games).

In May 1994, Broncos CEO John Ribot first discussed with some of the club's high-profile players the possibility of a hypothetical new competition with higher salaries.

One objective of the proposal was "to ensure that no other competition could exist in competition to Superleague". Accordingly, it was considered necessary to have at least four teams based in Sydney in order to maintain the game's largest base, and to ensure that all teams were privately owned. To ensure this outcome, the following steps were outlined:

1. Approach four "continuing teams" (Brisbane, Canberra, Newcastle and Auckland) to secure a 7-year commitment.
2. Meet with representatives of the ARL in a "casual pleasant atmosphere" and offer "concessions", such as allowing the ARL to conduct Tests and to retain the profits from those matches. The ARL was also to be given a grant to promote the game.
3. Meet at short notice with representatives of the 11 Sydney clubs and Illawarra, and offer a share in a team. Where there was more than one club in an area, each club was to be offered a percentage share.
4. Announce that Super League was happening and to explain its structure.
5. Deal with other clubs not included in the arrangements, such as the South Queensland Crushers.

The document noted that the co-operation of players and some clubs was essential for the new competition. It acknowledged that compensation might have to be offered to unwanted players and teams, and that it would be difficult to use current names and logos.

On 17 October, the board of the ARL resolved to hold a special board meeting to discuss several issues, including Super League and a "reduction in the number of Sydney teams". Three days later ARL chairman Ken Arthurson warned the Brisbane Broncos that they faced expulsion over their involvement with Super League. He told The Sydney Morning Herald that "the League has the right, as you well know, to deny admission to any team in the Winfield Cup". Nonetheless, reports of a proposed breakaway competition continued, and on 6 November Arthurson rang his colleague John Quayle from England and instructed him to inform the president of each club that he wished to discuss the signing of 3- to 5-year loyalty agreements in order to continue playing in the premiership.

News began developing the Super League proposal for presentation to the ARL and its clubs, the final draft of which was presented to News representatives on 13 December. It concluded that the economics of an Australian Super League were attractive compared to the existing competition. Three strategies where identified for its implementation:

1. The Establishment Approach in which a proposal would be presented to the ARL, followed by negotiations "to make Superleague happen". Risks identified with this approach included being "strung along" or "outbid" by Mr Packer and the possibility that the ARL would be unable to deliver.
2. The Early Defection Approach envisaged that exclusive and reciprocal obligations to News after a proposal had been made. Only if the ARL responded favourably to the proposal, News use the first strategy.
3. The Rebel Approach involved News manoeuvring with stakeholders to strengthen its position, signing up key clubs on confidentiality agreements and then securing the agreement of the ARL and unsigned clubs.

The proposed structure of the competition included:

- 12 fully professional teams
- Existing 20 clubs to remain, fielding teams in First Division competitions in NSW, QLD, ACT
- News being shareholders in the 12 Super League teams
- The ARL continuing as the governing body for rugby league, and retaining responsibility for Test matches
- News being responsible for promoting rugby league nationally and internationally, and providing finance.

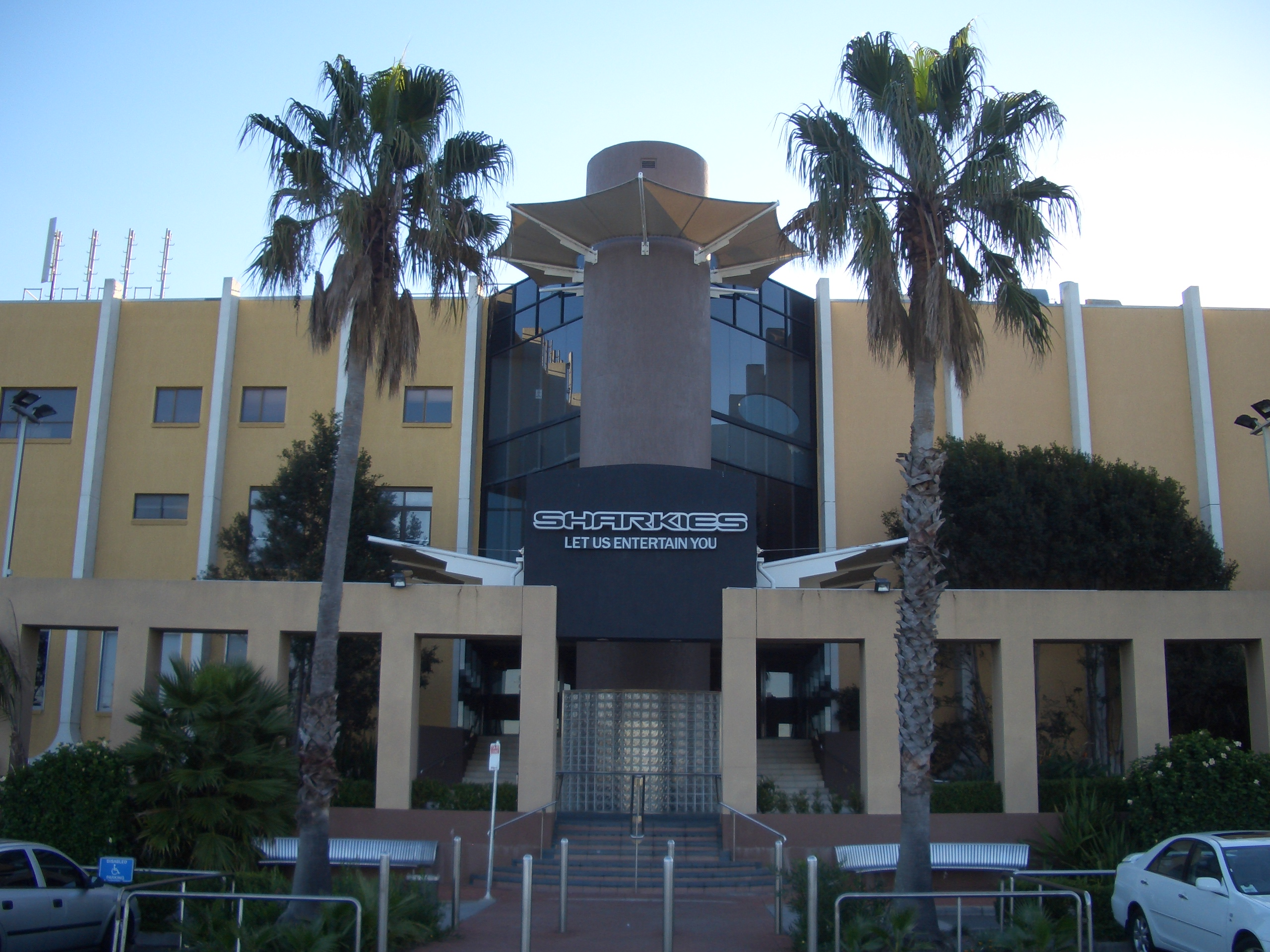
Cronulla's stadium, Endeavour Field

On 22 December, News sent five clubs - Brisbane, Canberra, Newcastle, Cronulla-Sutherland and the Western Reds - a document entitled Super League Confidentiality Deed. The purpose of this document was obtain feedback from these clubs with the view to making small adjustments prior a full presentation to the ARL in February. Throughout January 1995, News developed a presentation for the ARL and met with officials from the Auckland, Cronulla-Sutherland, Illawarra and St George clubs. On 25 January, ACP provided News with a report entitled Superleague Options that identified the "current proposal" as "News Super League via Clubs/ARL". It proposed that Super League would fund the ARL ($3,000,000 per annum), the clubs ($2,500,000 per annum) and Super League Europe. News was also to take a management fee and buy pay television rights for $4,000,000 per annum. News did not agree with these figures.

News presented its proposal to the ARL on 30 January. The key points were.

1. There would be a 12 team competition that would be an integral part of an international competition, with a worldwide audience of tens or even hundreds of millions.
2. The existing 20 team competition would continue, along with the ARL's "pivotal role" in administering the game. The ARL would run the State competition and Test matches, and be responsible for the judiciary, referees and junior development. The existing 20 clubs would be shareholders in the licensed, privately owned Super League teams, thus eliminating any breach of players' contracts. The 20-club competition would be the "breeding ground for the stars of the future".
3. The franchises would be based in Sydney (4), Queensland (2), Newcastle, Canberra, Melbourne, Adelaide, Perth and Auckland (1 each).
4. The current financial status of the game was a net loss. The Super League proposal would allow the clubs to benefit from News' global media network, and make it possible for $100m to be invested in rugby league.
5. There would be a "fully representative Board of Directors", with three franchise board members and the ARL represented. The chairman of the ARL would be the chairman of Super League.
6. Profit distribution between the ARL and News would be negotiable.

=== The war planning continues ===
In the weeks following the 6 February meeting with the ARL, Messers Cowley, Smith and Ribot offered players and clubs huge sums to bring them across to the new competition.

At least one loyal club took the view that Super League, perhaps in an altered version, was not out of the question. In a letter dated 16 February 1995, Mr Hudson, the chairman of the board of Manly-Warringah, wrote to Mr Quayle: "there are great advantages for News Limited in getting their current proposal, or some version of it, finally accepted. Hence, we feel that the proposition is not 'dead and buried' and that attempts to de-stabilise the competition will continue. There is a vulnerability in this which News Limited have identified. Their twelve (12) team competition has just four (4) teams in Sydney. They can see that a Sydney club can only survive with great difficulty financially and logistically, against the competition provided by one city clubs, and now (for Brisbane) a two (2) club city. If the situation of the eleven (11) teams in Sydney is not addressed in some way by the League, the threat of a take-over, or such like, will continue to loom large. We suggest that a plan to address the problems of the eleven (11) Sydney clubs vis-a-vis their colleagues in other cities and in other states is urgently needed." The letter went on to request that the question of the Sydney clubs be considered by the Premiership Policy Committee on an urgent basis.

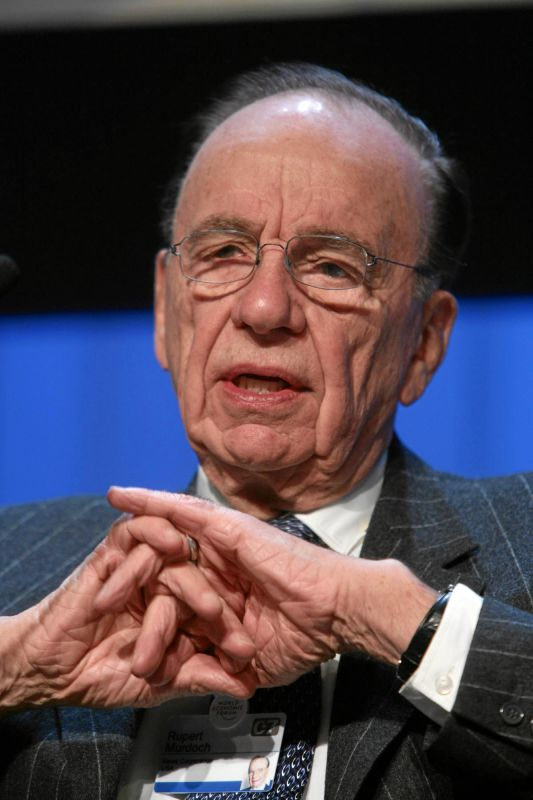
Rupert Murdoch

On 23 March 1995, a meeting took place within News. The participants included Messrs Cowley, Smith and Ribot, together with News Ltd. owner Rupert Murdoch. Notes from the meeting stated that the first attempt to build an Australian Super League had been unsuccessful, because News had made some wrong assumptions. In particular, it had been assumed that the threat of clubs defecting to an alternative competition would pressure the ARL to accept the concept and that the ARL had the ability to grant television rights to News. News' position had been weakened because the clubs did not think that News would follow through with a rival competition outside the ARL. Moreover, Kerry Packer had dominated events, in large measure because of his threat at the meeting of 6 February 1995 to sue clubs in the event of breach. This threat had "spooked" club officials. What was needed, according to the notes, in order to set up a competition in 1997 or, perhaps, 1996, was a second, more aggressive approach. Building an Australian Super League to capture television rights would cost $60 million over four years. Super League would be owned and operated by News.

The key elements of the more aggressive approach were to:

a) Sign up all the players required for a ten team Australian competition, at approximately twice their current earnings;
b) Mount a challenge to the "Five Year Agreement" binding the clubs;
c) Credibly mount a rival Super League without the "ARL Establishment", even though the "best" outcome was for the ARL to co-operate.

Clearly enough, Murdoch approved the option of the "rebel competition". Thereafter, detailed planning took place within the News organisation. The planning was recorded in a chart designated as the "war room" chart. The expression "war room" was apparently a reference to Mr Smith's office at News. The planning group prepared a schedule of about 200 target players, considered to be the ARL's "core playing strength" (a phrase used by Mr Raneberg, a consultant engaged by ACP). A "Presenter's Outline" was drafted, setting out, in effect, a sales pitch designed to persuade players contracted to ARL clubs to sign with Super League. Plans were formulated for approaches to be made to players and coaches in various parts of Australia and New Zealand. The plans included making travel arrangements under false names in order to preserve secrecy.

=== United Kingdom and New Zealand sign with Super League ===
To ensure that it could have control of representative fixtures, News signed the Rugby Football League and New Zealand Rugby League organisations up on 6 April 1995.

A further meeting of the Australian Rugby League board of the League took place on 7 April 1995. Among other things, the board discussed the actions of News in completing arrangements with the New Zealand Rugby League and the Rugby Football League. This was a matter of considerable significance to the League, since test matches between Australia, Great Britain and New Zealand had been conducted through the New Zealand and British Leagues.

=== Rugby league in court ===
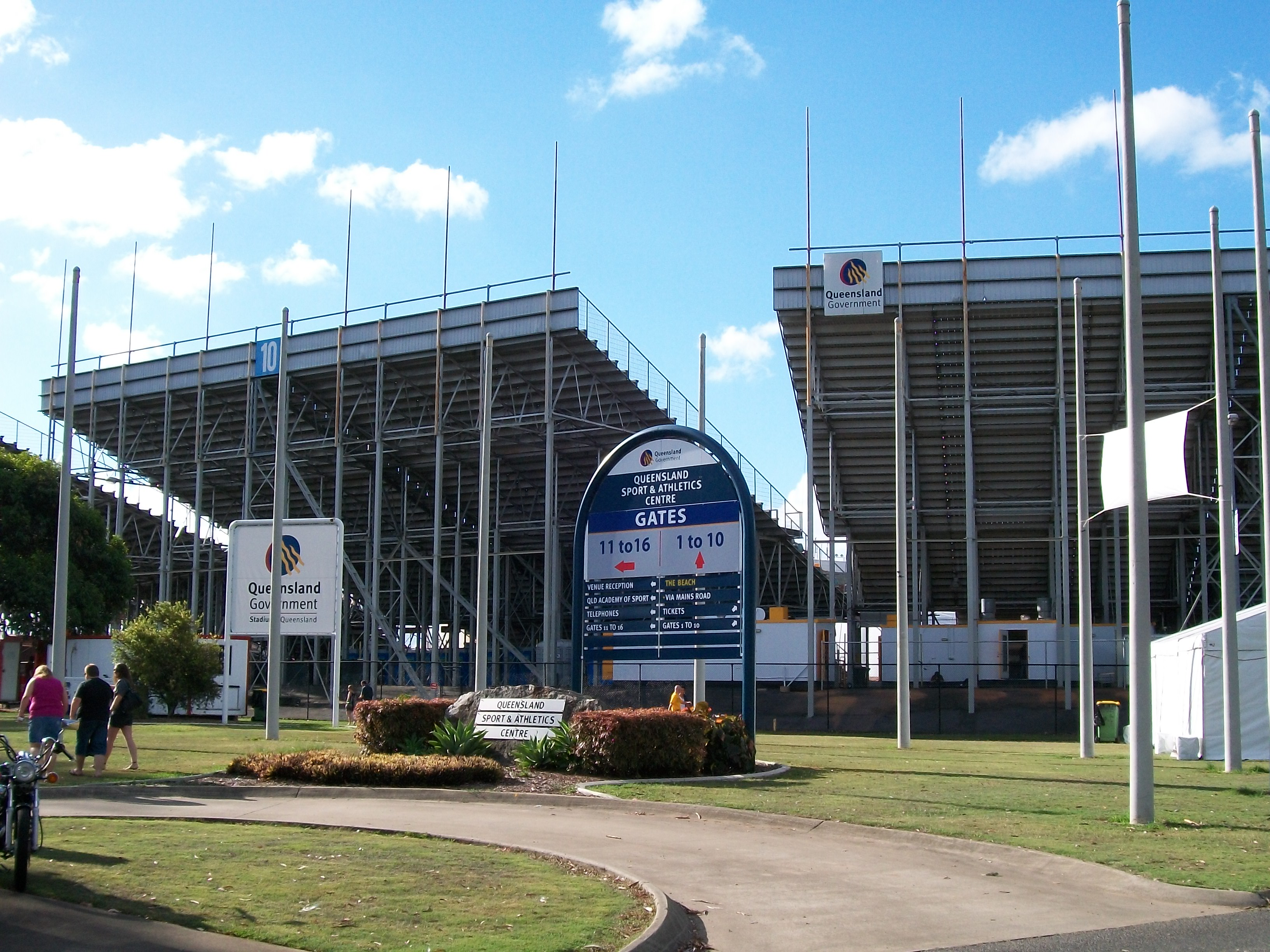
The Broncos' then home ground, ANZ Stadium

On 3 February 1995, Brisbane Broncos started Federal Court action against the NSWRL over salary cap rules. On 30 March 1995, News commenced legal action against the ARL, NSWRL and six clubs, alleging breaches of the Trade Practices Act.

On 25 September 1995, the ARL commenced legal action in the Federal Court of Australia to stop the new competition beginning in 1996. Justice James Burchett handed down his findings on 23 February 1996. He found that the ARL owned rights to all club colours, logos, names and jerseys. Justice Burchett also said that News Corp had acted with "dishonesty" and "duplicity".

Formal orders were given in the Federal Court on 11 March 1996 to prevent any alternative rugby league football competition being held until 2000. The scope of these orders was reduced on appeal to the Full Court on 13 March 1996, but still precluded the start of the Super League competition. Rupert Murdoch described the court decision as "1-nil at half-time".

All Super League teams forfeited the first round of the ARL competition, except for Auckland Warriors, who claimed two uncontested premiership points from their unplayed match against Brisbane Broncos. Most Super League players played in the ARL season of 1996, with the notable exception of St George's Gorden Tallis who sat the season out, and did not play again until he joined Brisbane Broncos in 1997.

British Rugby League boss Maurice Lindsay announced on 20 March 1996 that a new competition named Global League would be created, using the same players as the now-banned News competition, and featuring clubs such as Cronulla Dolphins (instead of Sharks), Canberra Vikings (instead of Raiders) and Penrith Pumas (instead of Panthers).

On 4 October 1996, Federal Court Justices John Lockhart, Ronald Sackville and John von Doussa set aside all of Justice Burchett's previous orders, clearing the way for the Super League Telstra Cup to commence in 1997. ARL Chairman Ken Arthurson wrote, "I was furious, hurt, bewildered... I felt as if had been run over by the Southern Aurora." Lindsay, who led the British game into Super League was ecstatic at the victory, comparing it to "winning a cup final".

The ARL appealed but their case was dismissed on 15 November 1996 in, according to Arthurson, "less time than it took to play a half of football." Following the court decision, Kerry Packer met with Rupert Murdoch to resolve their differences over rugby league, and on 17 January 1997, Packer's Nine Network announced that it had secured free-to-air broadcast rights for Super League. On 22 January 1997, Ken Arthurson announced his resignation from the ARL.

== Aftermath ==
=== Creation of the National Rugby League ===
With twenty-two teams playing in two competitions in 1997, crowd attendances and corporate sponsorships were spread very thinly, and many teams found themselves in financial difficulty. On 23 September 1997, the ARL announced that it was forming a new company to control the competition in 1998 and invited Super League clubs to participate. On 7 October, Rupert Murdoch announced that he was confident that there would be a single competition in 1998, and on 19 December 1997, representatives of clubs affiliated with the Australian Rugby League gathered at the Sydney Football Stadium to decide whether to accept News Limited's offer of a settlement - eventually voting in favour by 36 votes to 4. As a result, in the following months the National Rugby League (NRL), jointly owned by the ARL and News Limited was formed. The conditions of this merger controversially included an agreement to reduce the number of teams competing in the NRL to 14 by the year 2000.

=== Broadcasting rights ===
In 1998, Packer's Nine Network secured the free-to-air broadcasting rights for the NRL until 2007 for $13,000,000 a year, while Foxtel and Optus Vision were to be joint Pay TV broadcasters until 2000. In 2001, C7 Sport (the successor to Optus Vision's Sports Australia channels) unsuccessfully attempted to buy the pay television NRL rights until 2006 for $72,000,000 per annum. After Nine resigned these rights, and acquired the AFL broadcast rights, C7 was shut down in March 2002, leaving Fox Sports as the dominant Australian pay television sports network. As a result of the failure of C7, its owners commenced legal proceedings against parties, including Fox Sports, Foxtel and the NRL Partnership, for damages of $1 billion. In 2008 the case was dismissed.

The free to air rights were renewed in 2005 until 2012 for an amount of $40,000,000 a year.

Foxtel was originally half-owned by News Corporation and half-owned by Telstra. On 30 October 1998, PBL purchased a quarter share in Foxtel from News Corporation for $160,000,000.

=== Ribot's regret ===
Speaking in 2001, former Super League CEO John Ribot admitted he was not proud of helping start the conflict:

No, I'm not proud of it. I think there was a time that our game went through a real transition. Where we were heading probably wasn't the right way and we had a fight that probably could have been nicer behind closed doors. But it didn't happen that way and we've seen it now with our viewer patterns with free to air and pay TV that where we were heading was always going to end up in a bit of a fight. So I think the biggest thing... is that we learned from it and it wasn't a good time for us.

— John Ribot, Sportsworld, 25 March 2001

Ribot walked back some of those comments a few weeks later, telling The Daily Telegraph: "What I was asked was whether I regretted Super League. I said I regretted what happened to the game and that it would have been nice for it to have happened behind closed doors. I don't regret the issue of Super League, its concept or what it was all about."

== See also ==
- Anti-siphoning law
- Super League International Board
- World Series Cricket
