= Fabien Devecchi =

French rugby league footballer

Personal information
- Born: 9 March 1975 (age 51) Bias, Lot-et-Garonne, Aquitaine, France

Playing information
- Height: 173 cm (5 ft 8 in)
- Weight: 76 kg (12 st 0 lb)

Rugby league
- Position: Scrum-half
Club
Years	Team	Pld	T	G	FG	P
19??–??	Villeneuve-sur-Lot
1996–97	Paris Saint-Germain	27	3	11	1
1998–99	Widnes Vikings	19	9		2
2000–2001	Grand Avignon XIII	31	4	3	1
	Total	77	16	14	4	0
Representative
Years	Team	Pld	T	G	FG	P
1996–01	France	20	7	0	0

Rugby union
Club
Years	Team	Pld	T	G	FG	P
2002–05	Mont-de-Marsan

Coaching information
Club
Years	Team	Gms	W	D	L	W%
20??–21	Villeneuve Leopards

Fabien Devecchi is a French rugby league footballer who represented France national rugby league team in the 2000 World Cup. He remains in a role at Villeneuve Leopards, but no longer as head coach, having been replaced by Olivier Janzac in Mar 2021.

== Playing career ==
Devecchi played for Paris Saint-Germain, Widnes Vikings and Grand Avignon XIII.

He played in twenty test matches for France, including the 2000 World Cup and 2001 tour of New Zealand and Papua New Guinea.

== Coaching career ==
On 9 March 2021 Villeneuve reported that he dismissed as head coach and replaced by Olivier Janzac.
