= Maurice Lindsay (rugby league) =

British rugby league administrator (1941–2022)

- Born: Maurice Patrick Lindsay; 8 May 1941; Lancaster, Lancashire, England
- Died: 17 May 2022 (aged 81); Blackpool, England

Maurice Patrick Lindsay (8 May 1941 – 17 May 2022) was an English rugby league executive. He had two spells as chairman of Wigan (later Wigan Warriors), from 1979 to 1992 and 1999 to 2007, leading the club in a period when they became the dominant force in English rugby league. He was chief executive of the Rugby Football League, chief executive of Super League, and chairman of English football club Preston North End.

== Life and career ==
Lindsay was the owner of a contractors plant hire company as well as a bookmaker when he joined Wigan in 1979 with Jack Robinson, Tom Rathbone and Jack Hilton, known as the 'Gang of Four'. This led to an upsurge in the fortunes of the club. Wigan became one of the first teams to turn professional in the league and dominated the scene winning an eight League Championships, between 1987 and 1996, as well as nine Challenge Cup wins including a record eight consecutive wins between 1988 and 1995 as well as five Lancashire Cups and three World Club Championships.

He was directly responsible for some of the recruitment in that time frame, bringing players to the club who later went on to become legends such as Dean Bell, Andrew Farrell, Andy Goodway, Andy Platt, Brett Kenny, Denis Betts, Ellery Hanley, Frano Botica, Joe Lydon, Jason Robinson, Martin Offiah and Mick Cassidy.

During his time at the club, Lindsay became team manager of the Great Britain RL team. He was manager when the team toured New Zealand in 1990 and Australia in 1992. He was also elected as President of the Rugby Football League in 1992.

Lindsay left the club for a while and became the chief executive of the RFL in 1992, proposing the Super League which eventually replaced the First Division Championship as the sport's elite league competition in the UK from 1996 onwards. In 1996, he also became chairman of the Rugby League International Board which at the time, was at odds with the Australian Rugby League. Lindsay left the RFL to become the chief executive of the newly formed Super League (Europe) Ltd. in February 2008. This followed an acrimonious period and in-fighting within the league divisions including an attempt to unseat the chairman of the RFL, Sir Rodney Walker. Relations between Lindsay and Walker had deteriorated but the leading clubs wanted Lindsay to assume control of the newly formed Super League. Lindsay immediately secured a new lucrative TV contract exclusively for Super League. He remained at Super League until he retired at the end of 1999.

He re-joined Wigan when they moved from Central Park to the home of Wigan Athletic, the JJB Stadium, after Dave Whelan saved them from liquidation. The club's dominance had come under threat now that the league had gone fully professional and the introduction of the salary cap and 20/20 ruling (now 20/25) which meant the club at the time had only won two Super League titles since 1996.

With the return of Lindsay the club won one Challenge Cup, under the coaching of Stuart Raper in 2002, and reached the finals of the Super League in 2000, 2001 and 2003, losing all three. This was seen as unacceptable by the Wigan board, and Lindsay in particular. The club had seven coaches after Lnidsay's return, with Andy Goodway, Frank Endacott, Stuart Raper, Denis Betts & Ian Millward all losing their jobs due to poor performances. (Mike Gregory was given leave due to an illness from which he later died).

The club had a stark fall in its league position, with 2005 seeing the club fail to reach the top six for the first time in Super League and the 2006 season seeing the club rooted to the bottom of the league for most of the season before the sacking of Ian Millward and the acquisition of Brian Noble from Bradford Bulls.

Due to increasing pressure on Lindsay to step down, he resigned, releasing a statement on 30 July 2007 which cited a disappointment of missing out on reaching the new Wembley for the Challenge Cup and ill health as the reasons for stepping down. It was also said that Dave Whelan, the club's owner persuaded Lindsay to remain until the end of the season but may be looking to sell the club himself.

During the weekend of the 2007 Challenge Cup final, Lindsay was taken to hospital after the club's doctor told him he needed urgent medical attention due to a perforated gall bladder which needed operating on. Lindsay was ordered by his doctor not to attend his final ever match at the JJB Stadium as chairman of Wigan, a match which saw Wigan defeat their closest rivals St. Helens 20-12 to take the last available place in the 2007 play-offs. New owner & chairman Ian Lenagan took official control on 1 December 2007.

When Lindsay returned for his second stint at Wigan in 2000, he was subsequently put on to the Wigan Athletic F.C. board by Dave Whelan. Lindsay remained on the Wigan Athletic board and represented the shareholders committee of the FA Premier League. In 2008 the FA Premier League elected him onto the FA Council.

In February 2009, Lindsay became chairman of Racecourse Data Technologies Ltd (RDT), where he remained. RDT have contracts to supply and support computerised betting systems to every racecourse in the UK and Ireland. The company holds contracts with Satellite Information Services Ltd (SiS) and Turf TV to supply data. RDT have subsequently secured an important contract with the British Horseracing Authority to act as contractors in support of their race day computer operations.

It was announced on 21 June 2010 that Lindsay replaced Derek Shaw as chairman of Preston North End F.C. He resigned as chairman in December 2011 after battling septicaemia following knee surgery.

Lindsay died from a combination of heart problems and diabetic complications in Blackpool, on 17 May 2022, aged 81.
