= List of Western Reds players =

This is a list of rugby league footballers who have played first grade for the Western Reds. Players are listed in the order they made their debut.

== Players ==
No.	Name	Career	Appearances	Tries	Goals	Field goals	Points
1	David Boyd	1995−1996	35	1	0	0	4
2	Shaun Devine	1995−1997	24	4	8	0	32
3	Jeff Doyle	1995−1997	37	6	0	0	24
4	Greg Fleming	1995−1997	55	16	0	0	64
5	Dale Fritz	1995−1997	58	3	0	0	12
6	Matt Fuller	1995−1997	59	14	0	1	57
7	Mark Geyer	1995−1997	33	2	0	0	0
8	Brett Goldspink	1995−1996	26	2	0	0	8
9	James Grant	1995	9	0	0	0	0
10	Tim Horan	1995−1997	33	7	0	1	29
11	Rodney Howe	1995−1997	40	2	0	0	8
12	Brad Mackay	1995	21	4	0	0	16
13	Michael Potter	1995−1996	21	1	0	0	4
14	Matthew Rodwell	1995−1997	58	20	0	0	80
15	Chris Ryan	1995−1996	58	21	0	63	210
16	Peter Shiels	1995−1996	48	3	0	0	12
17	Jason Eade	1995−1996	24	3	0	0	12
18	Jamie Olejnik	1995	7	1	0	0	4
19	Chris Dever	1995−1997	24	1	0	0	4
20	Peter Trevitt	1995−1997	2	0	0	0	0
21	Scott Donnelly	1995	1	0	0	0	0
22	Wayne Evans	1995−1997	14	1	0	0	4
23	James Goulding	1995	1	0	0	0	0
24	Tahi Reihana	1995−1996	6	1	0	0	4
25	Brendon Tuuta	1995	9	0	0	0	0
26	Craig Innes	1995	10	4	0	0	16
27	Barrie-Jon Mather	1995−1997	24	5	0	0	20
28	Jon Grieve	1995−1997	30	4	0	0	16
29	Corin Ridding	1995, 1997	9	0	0	0	0
30	Daio Powell	1995	1	0	0	0	0
31	Damien Chapman	1996−1997	19	2	16	1	41
32	Darren Higgins	1996−1997	28	4	0	0	16
33	Robbie Kearns	1996−1997	37	4	0	0	16
34	Julian O'Neill	1996−1997	26	12	63	4	178
35	Shane Barrett	1996	3	1	0	0	4
36	Cameron Blair	1996	14	0	0	0	0
37	Solomon Kiri	1996	2	0	0	0	0
38	Andrew Neave	1996	2	1	0	0	4
39	David Lomax	1996	1	0	0	0	0
40	Paul Evans	1996	8	3	0	0	12
41	Luke Goodwin	1996	3	1	4	0	12
42	Robin Thorne	1996	1	0	0	0	0
43	Scott Wilson	1996−1997	23	7	0	0	28
44	Paul Bell	1997	14	4	0	0	16
45	Brett Green	1997	18	0	0	0	0
46	Matt Daylight	1997	11	3	0	0	12
47	Eamonn Edgar	1997	5	1	0	0	4
48	Cameron Lewis	1997	4	0	0	0	0
49	Tristan Brady-Smith	1997	7	2	0	0	8
50	Jarrad Millar	1997	17	3	0	0	12
51	Matt Geyer	1997	6	0	0	0	0
52	Fred Sapatu	1997	1	0	0	0	0
53	John Wilshere	1997	4	1	0	0	4
54	Ricky Taylor	1997	1	0	0	0	0
