= List of Hunter Mariners records =

This article shows the records set by the Hunter Mariners in their one and only season in the 1997 Super League competition.

== Game Records ==
=== Biggest Wins ===
Margin	Score	Opponent	Venue	Date
28	38-10	North Queensland Cowboys	Topper Stadium	22 March 1997 (Round 4)
24	30-6	Penrith Panthers	Topper Stadium	16 May 1997 (Round 11)
20	36-16	Perth Reds	Topper Stadium	18 April 1997 (Round 8)

=== Biggest Losses ===
Margin	Score	Opponent	Venue	Date
26	0-26	Cronulla Sharks	Shark Park	26 April 1997 (Round 9)
19	14-33	North Queensland Cowboys	Stockland Stadium	13 July 1997 (Round 15)
18	16-34	Brisbane Broncos	ANZ Stadium	18 August 1997 (Round 17)

=== Most Points in a Game (Win) ===
Points	Opponent	Score	Date	Venue
38	North Queensland	38-10	22 March 1997 (Round 4)	Topper Stadium
36	Perth Reds	36-16	18 April 1997 (Round 8)	Topper Stadium
30	Penrith Panthers	30-6	16 May 1997 (Round 11)	Topper Stadium

=== Most Points in a Game (Loss) ===
Points	Opponent	Score	Date	Venue
36	Canterbury	36-48	12 May 1997 (Round 10)	Belmore Sports Ground
24	Penrith Panthers	24-36	4 April 1997 (Round 6)	Penrith Football Stadium
22	Perth Reds	22-30	10 August 1997 (Round 16)	WACA

=== Most Points Conceded in a Game ===
Points	Opponent	Score	Date	Venue
48	Canterbury	36-48	12 May 1997 (Round 10)	Belmore Sports Ground
36	Penrith Panthers	24-36	4 April 1997 (Round 6)	Penrith Football Stadium
34	Brisbane Broncos	16-34	18 August 1997 (Round 17)	ANZ Stadium

=== Highest Scoring Games (Win and Loss) ===
Points	Opponent	Result	Score	Date	Venue
84	Canterbury	Loss	36-48	12 May 1997 (Round 10)	Belmore Sports Ground
60	Penrith Panthers	Loss	24-36	4 April 1997 (Round 6)	Penrith Football Stadium
52	Perth Reds	Win	36-16	18 April 1997 (Round 8)	Topper Stadium
52	Perth Reds	Loss	22-30	10 August 1997 (Round 16)	WACA

=== Lowest Scoring Games (Win and Loss) ===
Points	Opponent	Result	Score	Date	Venue
12	Adelaide Rams	Win	12-2	5 July 1997 (Round 14)	Topper Stadium
18	Adelaide Rams	Loss	8-10	14 March 1997 (Round 3)	Adelaide Oval

=== Best/Worst Start to a Season ===
The Hunter Mariners only played in one season. In this season, the team lost five of their first six games.

=== Top Home Attendances ===
Stadium	Crowd	Opponent	Date
Topper Stadium	7,719	Auckland Warriors	12 April 1997 (Round 7)
Topper Stadium	7,404	Canberra Raiders	27 June 1997 (Round 13)
Topper Stadium	7,124	Brisbane Broncos	30 May 1997 (Round 12)

=== Top Away Attendances ===
Stadium	Crowd	Opponent	Date
Adelaide Oval	27,435	Adelaide Rams	14 March 1997 (Round 3)
Ericsson Stadium	20,300	Auckland Warriors	8 March 1997 (Round 2)
Bruce Stadium	15,650	Canberra Raiders	30 March 1997 (Round 5)

== Individual Records ==
=== Most First Grade Games ===
Games	Player	Period
18	Scott Hill	1997
18	Troy Stone	1997

=== Most Points in a First Grade Career ===
Points	Player	Tries	Goals	Field Goals
76	Nick Zisti	9	20/33	0
32	John Carlaw	8	0	0
28	Keith Beauchamp	7	0	0
28	Noel Goldthorpe	3	8/14	0
28	Neil Piccinelli	6	2/7	0

=== Most Tries in a Match ===
Tries	Player	Match Details
3	Craig Wise	vs. Penrith Panthers, Topper Stadium, 16 May 1997 (Round 11) (Hunter won 30–6)

=== Most Goals in a Match ===
Goals	Kicker	Match Details
5	Nick Zisti	vs. North Queensland Cowboys, Topper Stadium, 22 March 1997 (Round 4) (Hunter won 38–10)

=== Most Points in a Match ===
Points	Scorer	Match Details
14 (1 try, 5 goals)	Nick Zisti	vs. North Queensland Cowboys, Topper Stadium, 22 March 1997 (Round 4) (Hunter won 38–10)

=== Most Tries in a Season ===
Tries	Scorer	Season Details
9	Nick Zisti	17 Games, 1997
8	John Carlaw	13 Games, 1997
7	Keith Beauchamp	17 Games, 1997

=== Most Points in a Season ===
Points	Scorer	Season Details
76 (9 tries, 20 goals)	Nick Zisti	17 Games, 1997
32 (8 tries)	John Carlaw	13 Games, 1997

== Streaks ==
=== Longest Winning Streaks ===
- 4 Matches (16 May 1997, Round 11 to 5 July 1997, Round 14)

=== Longest Losing Streaks ===
- 4 Matches (13 July 1997, Round 15 to 24 August 1997, Round 18)

== Biggest Wins and Losses (by Opponent) ==
Opponent	Win	Loss
Adelaide Rams	10-2 (5 July 1997, Round 14)	8-10 (14 March 1997, Round 3)
Auckland Warriors	18-10 (12 April 1997, Round 7)	14-18 (8 March 1997, Round 2)
Brisbane Broncos	24-6 (30 May 1997, Round 12)	16-34 (18 August 1997, Round 17)
Canberra Raiders	16-12 (27 June 1997, Round 13)	12-18 (30 March 1997, Round 5)
Canterbury Bulldogs	–	36-48 (12 May 1997, Round 10)
Cronulla Sharks	–	0-26 (26 April 1997, Round 9)
North Queensland Cowboys	38-10 (22 March 1997, Round 4)	14-33 (13 July 1997, Round 15)
Penrith Panthers	30-6 (16 May 1997, Round 11)	24-36 (4 April 1997, Round 6)
Perth Reds	36-16 (18 April 1997, Round 8)	22-30 (10 August 1997, Round 16)

=== Head To Head Records ===
Opponent	Played	Won	Drawn	Lost
Adelaide Rams	2	1	0	1
Auckland Warriors	2	1	0	1
Brisbane Broncos	2	1	0	1
Canberra Raiders	2	1	0	1
Canterbury Bulldogs	2	0	0	2
Cronulla Sharks	2	0	0	2
North Queensland Cowboys	2	1	0	1
Penrith Panthers	2	1	0	1
Perth Reds	2	1	0	1

== Finals Records ==
The Hunter Mariners finished sixth in the ten competition, just missing out on playing in the finals.
