= 1997 World Club Championship =

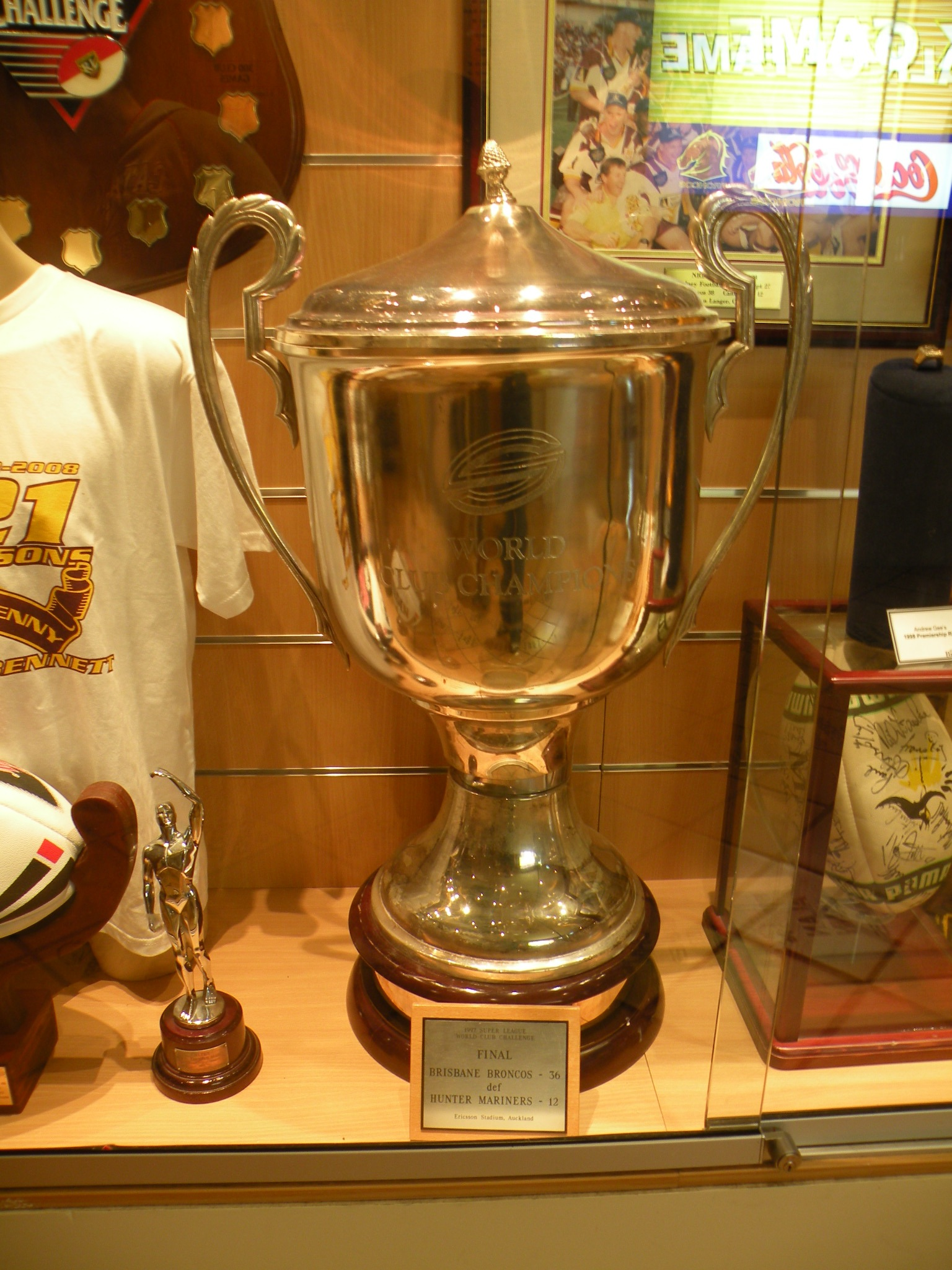
- Trophy won by Brisbane Broncos
- Duration: 6 June – 17 October 1997
- Teams: 22
- Matches played: 68
- Average attendance: 7,989
- Total attendance: 543,258
- Champions: Brisbane Broncos (2nd title)
- Runners-up: Hunter Mariners
- Top point-scorer: Ryan Girdler (118 points)
- Top try-scorer: Steve Renouf (13)

The 1997 World Club Championship was an expansion of the World Club Challenge concept by Super League. The rugby competition was restructured to include all 22 clubs from the Australasian Super League and the Super League championships and was known as the Visa World Club Championship due to sponsorship. As it was contested over six rounds in two hemispheres, with A$1 million prize money (GBP 640,000), the competition was prohibitively expensive to stage, with suggestions that it cost A$6 million. This coupled with the poor ratings and attendances that were achieved both in Australia and Europe reportedly resulted in a loss over A$5 million, and the World Club Challenge was not staged again for a number of years. No British teams progressed further than the quarter-finals, with two Australian teams reaching the final (played at the Ericsson Stadium in Auckland, New Zealand): the dominant Brisbane Broncos club and the ill-fated Hunter Mariners.

== Format ==
The competition was held during the second season of the European Super League competition and the inaugural season of the Australasian Super League season. Both competitions paused their competitions for the first three rounds in June, and again for the second round of matches in July-August.

Teams in each competition were seeded into two pools to ensure that the leading teams would play each other. The Australasian teams were split into a pool of six teams that contained the teams that had finished highly in the 1996 ARL season, and a pool of four teams that included the expansion Super League franchises Hunter Mariners and Adelaide Rams. The European Super League teams were split into two pools of six teams in order of the final positions of the clubs during the 1996 Super League season. Promoted club Salford Reds joined Pool B.

With only four teams in the Australasian Pool B, the six European teams had two bye weekends.

The competition saw five Australasian teams tour Europe for each set of three match weekends, with five European teams simultaneously touring Australasia.

Following the completion of the pool matches, the top three teams from both of the competitions Pool A progressed to the quarter finals, with the winner of the Australasian Pool B. The winner of the European Pool B faced the fourth-placed team from Pool A in an elimination qualifier for a place in the quarter finals. The playoffs took place after the completion of the respective Super League competitions.

Credit card company Visa was announced as the competition sponsor just before the European launch of the championship at Huddersfield. The sponsorship was described as a "substantial investment to help offset the estimated £2 million operational costs."

== Pool stage tables ==
The Australasian and European teams were each divided into two pools for the 1997 World Club Challenge. Each pool had six teams, with the exception of Australasia B, which had the two lowest placed Super League-aligned teams and the two newly formed teams: the Hunter Mariners and the Adelaide Rams. The finals series was contested between the top three teams in Australasia Pool A and Europe Pool A, and the top team from Australasia Pool B and Europe Pool B.

=== Super League (Australia and New Zealand) ===
Pool A

Pos	Team	Pld	W	D	L	PF	PA	PD	Pts	Qualification
1	Brisbane Broncos	6	6	0	0	270	52	+218	12	Advance to Quarter-finals
2	Auckland Warriors	6	6	0	0	268	82	+186	12	Advance to Quarter-finals
3	Cronulla Sharks	6	6	0	0	230	54	+176	12	Advance to Quarter-finals
4	Penrith Panthers	6	6	0	0	256	120	+136	12	
5	Canberra Raiders	6	5	0	1	302	108	+194	10	
6	Canterbury Bulldogs	6	4	0	2	218	121	+97	8	

Source: RLP
Rules for classification: 1) Points; 2) Point difference; 3) Points scored.

Pool B

Pos	Team	Pld	W	D	L	PF	PA	PD	Pts	Qualification
1	Hunter Mariners	6	6	0	0	226	50	+176	12	Advance to Quarter-finals
2	North Queensland Cowboys	6	5	0	1	228	92	+136	10	
3	Adelaide Rams	6	4	0	2	170	68	+102	8	
4	Perth Reds	6	4	0	2	148	104	+44	8	

Source: RLP
Rules for classification: 1) Points; 2) Point difference; 3) Points scored.

=== Super League (Great Britain and France) ===
Pool A

Pos	Team	Pld	W	D	L	PF	PA	PD	Pts	Qualification
1	Wigan Warriors	6	2	0	4	89	212	−123	4	Advance to Quarter-finals
2	London Broncos	6	1	0	5	136	238	−102	2	Advance to Quarter-finals
3	Bradford Bulls	6	0	0	6	82	228	−146	0	Advance to Quarter-finals
4	St Helens	6	0	0	6	96	270	−174	0	Advance to Elimination final
5	Warrington Wolves	6	0	0	6	78	256	−178	0	
6	Halifax Blue Sox	6	0	0	6	56	340	−284	0	

Source: RLP
Rules for classification: 1) Points; 2) Point difference; 3) Points scored.

Pool B

Pos	Team	Pld	W	D	L	PF	PA	PD	Pts	Qualification
1	Paris Saint-Germain	4	1	0	3	48	90	−42	2	Advance to Elimination final
2	Leeds Rhinos	4	1	0	3	94	138	−44	2	
3	Oldham Bears	4	1	0	3	52	130	−78	2	
4	Salford City Reds	4	1	0	3	44	130	−86	2	
5	Sheffield Eagles	4	1	0	3	54	168	−114	2	
6	Castleford Tigers	4	0	0	4	52	116	−64	0	

Source: RLP
Rules for classification: 1) Points; 2) Point difference; 3) Points scored.

== Results ==
=== Round 1 ===
June 6–9

Home	Score	Away	Match information			
Home	Score	Away	Day & Time (local)	Venue	Referee	Attendance
Brisbane Broncos	42 – 22	London Broncos	Friday 6 June, 7:30 pm	ANZ Stadium, Brisbane	Bill Harrigan	18,193
St. Helens	14 – 42	Auckland Warriors	Friday 6 June, 7:30 pm	Knowsley Road, St. Helens	Stuart Cummings	8,911
North Queensland Cowboys	42 – 20	Leeds Rhinos	Saturday 7 June, 7:30 pm	Stockland Stadium, Townsville	Steve Clark	14,561
Adelaide Rams	50 – 8	Salford Reds	Sunday 8 June, 2:00 pm	Adelaide Oval, Adelaide	Tim Mander	11,346
Canberra Raiders	70 – 6	Halifax Blue Sox	Sunday 8 June, 2:30 pm	Bruce Stadium, Canberra	Brian Grant	7,780
Paris St-Germain	12 – 28	Hunter Mariners	Sunday 8 June, 3:00 pm	Charlety Stadium, Paris	Steve Presley	3,500
Castleford Tigers	16 – 24	Perth Reds	Sunday 8 June, 3:30 pm	Wheldon Road, Castleford	Robert Connolly	3,590
Warrington Wolves	12 – 40	Cronulla Sharks	Sunday 8 June, 6:35 pm	Wilderspool Stadium, Warrington	Russell Smith	3,378
Canterbury Bulldogs	18 – 22	Wigan Warriors	Monday 9 June, 7:30 pm	Belmore Sports Ground, Sydney	Graham Annesley	10,680
Bradford Bulls	16 – 20	Penrith Panthers	Monday 9 June, 7:45 pm	Odsal Stadium, Bradford	David Campbell	14,378
Byes: Sheffield Eagles, Oldham Bears
References: RLP

=== Round 2 ===
June 13–16

Home	Score	Away	Match information			
Home	Score	Away	Day & Time (local)	Venue	Referee	Attendance
Adelaide Rams	34 – 8	Leeds Rhinos	Friday 13 June, 8:00 pm	Adelaide Oval, Adelaide	Steve Clarke	14,630
Castleford Tigers	12 – 42	Hunter Mariners	Friday 13 June, 7:30 pm	Wheldon Road, Castleford	Stuart Cummings	3,087
North Queensland Cowboys	54 – 16	Oldham Bears	Saturday 14 June, 7:30 pm	Stockland Stadium, Townsville	Graham Annesley	12,631
Bradford Bulls	16 – 20	Auckland Warriors	Saturday 14 June, 6:00 pm	Odsal Stadium, Bradford	Russell Smith	13,133
Canberra Raiders	66 – 20	London Broncos	Sunday 15 June, 2:30 pm	Bruce Stadium, Canberra	Tim Mander	6,471
Canterbury Bulldogs	58 – 6	Halifax Blue Sox	Sunday 15 June, 2:30 pm	Belmore Sports Ground, Sydney	Brian Grant	5,034
Warrington Wolves	22 – 52	Penrith Panthers	Sunday 15 June, 3:00 pm	Wilderspool Stadium, Warrington	Robert Connolly	3,850
Sheffield Eagles	26 – 22	Perth Reds	Sunday 15 June, 6:35 pm	Don Valley Stadium, Sheffield	John Connolly	2,065
Brisbane Broncos	34 – 0	Wigan Warriors	Monday 16 June, 7:30 pm	ANZ Stadium, Brisbane	Bill Harrigan	14,833
St Helens	8 – 48	Cronulla Sharks	Monday 16 June, 7:45 pm	Knowsley Road, St Helens	David Campbell	8,039
Byes: Paris St-Germain, Salford Reds
References: RLP

=== Round 3 ===
June 20–23

Home	Score	Away	Match information			
Home	Score	Away	Day & Time (local)	Venue	Referee	Attendance
Adelaide Rams	42 – 14	Oldham Bears	Friday 20 June, 8:00 pm	Adelaide Oval, Adelaide	Graham Annesley	13,852
Sheffield Eagles	4 – 40	Hunter Mariners	Friday 20 June, 7:30 pm	Don Valley Stadium, Sheffield	Russell Smith	2,350
Bradford Bulls	10 – 30	Cronulla Sharks	Friday 20 June, 7:30 pm	Odsal Stadium, Bradford	Stuart Cummings	10,756
North Queensland Cowboys	44 – 8	Salford Reds	Saturday 21 June, 7:30 pm	Stockland Stadium, Townsville	Brian Grant	15,508
Paris St-Germain	24 – 0	Perth Reds	Saturday 21 June, 7:00 pm	Charlety Stadium, Paris	David Campbell	3,500
Brisbane Broncos	76 – 0	Halifax Blue Sox	Sunday 22 June, 2:30 pm	ANZ Stadium, Brisbane	Tim Mander	11,358
Canberra Raiders	56 – 22	Wigan Warriors	Sunday 22 June, 2:30 pm	Bruce Stadium, Canberra	Steve Clark	9,098
St Helens	30 – 50	Penrith Panthers	Sunday 22 June, 6:35 pm	Knowsley Road, St Helens	John Connolly	6,671
Canterbury Bulldogs	34 – 18	London Broncos	Monday 23 June, 7:30 pm	Belmore Sports Ground, Sydney	Bill Harrigan	7,272
Warrington Wolves	28 – 56	Auckland Warriors	Monday 23 June, 7:45 pm	Wilderspool Stadium, Warrington	Steve Presley	4,428
Byes: Castleford Tigers, Leeds Rhinos
References: RLP

=== Round 4 ===
July 18–21

Home	Score	Away	Match information			
Home	Score	Away	Day & Time (local)	Venue	Referee	Attendance
Penrith Panthers	48 – 12	Warrington Wolves	Friday 18 July, 7:30 pm	Penrith Football Stadium, Penrith	Brian Grant	5,642
Oldham Bears	20 – 16	North Queensland Cowboys	Friday 18 July, 7:30 pm	Boundary Park, Oldham	Robert Connolly	2,961
Leeds Rhinos	22 – 14	Adelaide Rams	Friday 18 July, 7:30 pm	Headingley Rugby Stadium, Leeds	Russell Smith	11,269
Perth Reds	48 – 12	Sheffield Eagles	Saturday 19 July, 7:30 pm	WACA Ground, Perth	Steve Clark	7,429
Auckland Warriors	76 – 0	Bradford Bulls	Sunday 20 July, 2:30 pm	Ericsson Stadium, Auckland	Bill Harrigan	12,500
Hunter Mariners	26 – 8	Castleford Tigers	Sunday 20 July, 2:30 pm	Topper Stadium, Newcastle	Tim Mander	3,379
Halifax Blue Sox	22 – 40	Canterbury Bulldogs	Sunday 20 July, 3:00 pm	Thrum Hall, Halifax	Steve Presley	3,300
Wigan Warriors	4 – 30	Brisbane Broncos	Sunday 20 July, 6:35 pm	Central Park, Wigan	Stuart Cummings	13,476
Cronulla Sharks	28 – 12	St. Helens	Monday 21 July, 7:30 pm	Shark Park, Sydney	Graham Annesley	7,721
London Broncos	38 – 18	Canberra Raiders	Monday 21 July, 7:30 pm	The Stoop, London	John Connolly	7,819
Byes: Paris St-Germain, Salford Reds
References: RLP

=== Round 5 ===
July 25–28

Home	Score	Away	Match information			
Home	Score	Away	Day & Time (local)	Venue	Referee	Attendance
Auckland Warriors	70 – 6	St. Helens	Friday 25 July, 7:30 pm	Ericsson Stadium, Auckland	Steve Clark	18,354
Oldham Bears	2 – 18	Adelaide Rams	Friday 25 July, 7:30 pm	Boundary Park, Oldham	John Connolly	3,315
Cronulla Sharks	44 – 0	Warrington Wolves	Saturday 26 July, 7:30 pm	Shark Park, Sydney	Tim Mander	6,112
Hunter Mariners	32 – 0	Paris St-Germain	Sunday 27 July, 2:30 pm	Topper Stadium, Newcastle	Graham Annesley	2,210
Perth Reds	24 – 14	Castleford Tigers	Sunday 27 July, 2:30 pm	WACA Ground, Perth	Brian Grant	12,500
Halifax Blue Sox	12 – 42	Canberra Raiders	Sunday 27 July, 3:00 pm	Thrum Hall, Halifax	Robert Connolly	3,620
Salford City Reds	14 – 24	North Queensland Cowboys	Sunday 27 July, 3:00 pm	The Willows, Salford	Steve Presley	7,448
London Broncos	16 – 34	Brisbane Broncos	Sunday 27 July, 6:35 pm	The Stoop, London	Stuart Cummings	9,846
Penrith Panthers	54 – 14	Bradford Bulls	Monday 28 July, 7:30 pm	Penrith Football Stadium, Penrith	Bill Harrigan	5,336
Wigan Warriors	31 – 24	Canterbury Bulldogs	Monday 28 July, 7:45 pm	Central Park, Wigan	Russell Smith	10,280
Byes: Leeds Rhinos, Sheffield Eagles
References: RLP

=== Round 6 ===
August 1–4

Home	Score	Away	Match information			
Home	Score	Away	Day & Time (local)	Venue	Referee	Attendance
Perth Reds	18 – 8	Paris St-Germain	Friday 1 August, 6:30 pm	WACA Ground, Perth	Tim Mander	5,690
London Broncos	22 – 44	Canterbury Bulldogs	Friday 1 August, 7:30 pm	The Stoop, London	John Connolly	6,923
Cronulla Sharks	40 – 12	Bradford Bulls	Saturday 2 August, 7:30 pm	Shark Park, Sydney	Brian Grant	8,272
Auckland Warriors	16 – 4	Warrington Wolves	Sunday 3 August, 2:30 pm	Lancaster Park, Christchurch	Graham Annesley	5,500
Hunter Mariners	58 – 12	Castleford Tigers	Sunday 3 August, 2:30 pm	Topper Stadium, Newcastle	Steve Clark	1,965
Wigan Warriors	12 – 50	Canberra Raiders	Sunday 3 August, 3:00 pm	Central Park, Wigan	Steve Presley	12,504
Salford City Reds	14 – 12	Adelaide Rams	Sunday 3 August, 6:35 pm	The Willows, Salford	Stuart Cummings	6,995
Leeds Rhinos	14 – 48	North Queensland Cowboys	Sunday 3 August, 8:00 pm	Headingley Rugby Stadium, Leeds	Russell Smith	12,224
Penrith Panthers	32 – 26	St. Helens	Monday 4 August, 7:30 pm	Penrith Football Stadium, Penrith	Bill Harrigan	5,303
Halifax Blue Sox	10 – 54	Brisbane Broncos	Monday 4 August, 7:45 pm	Thrum Hall, Halifax	Robert Connolly	3,255
Byes: Castleford Tigers, Oldham Bears
References: RLP

== Playoffs ==
=== Bracket ===
Elimination qualifier
St. Helens	42
Paris St-Germain	4

Quarter-finals
Brisbane Broncos	66
St. Helens	12
Auckland Warriors	62
Bradford Bulls	14
Wigan Warriors	18
Hunter Mariners	22
London Broncos	16
Cronulla Sharks	40

Semi finals
Brisbane Broncos	22
Auckland Warriors	16
Cronulla Sharks	18
Hunter Mariners	22

Final
Brisbane Broncos	36
Hunter Mariners	12

=== Elimination qualifier ===
Wednesday, 13 August	St. Helens	42 – 4	Paris St-Germain	Knowsley Road, St. Helens
7:45 pm				Attendance: 3,641; Referee: Russell Smith

=== Quarter-finals ===
Friday, 3 October	Auckland Warriors	62 – 14	Bradford Bulls	Ericsson Stadium, Auckland
				Attendance: 12,063; Referee: Bill Harrigan

Friday, 3 October	Wigan Warriors	18 – 22	Hunter Mariners	Central Park, Wigan
				Attendance: 9,553; Referee: Russell Smith

Saturday, 4 October	Brisbane Broncos	66 – 12	St. Helens	ANZ Stadium, Brisbane
				Attendance: 6,438; Referee: Steve Clark

Saturday, 4 October	London Broncos	16 – 40	Cronulla Sharks	The Stoop, London
				Attendance: 6,239; Referee: Stuart Cummings

=== Semi-finals ===
Friday, 10 October	Brisbane Broncos	22 – 16	Auckland Warriors	ANZ Stadium, Brisbane
19:30 AEST (UTC+10)	Tries: Walker (2); Tallis; Walters; Goals: Walker (3)	1st: 10–10; 2nd: 12–6 [Report Report]	Tries: Oudenryn (2); Endacott; Goals: Ridge (2)	Attendance: 9,686; Referee: Graham Annesley

Saturday, 11 October	Cronulla Sharks	18 – 22	Hunter Mariners	Shark Park, Sydney
19:30 AEST (UTC+10)	Tries: Ettingshausen; Richardson; Rogers; Goals: Rogers (3)	1st: 12–12; 2nd: 6–10 [Report Report]	Tries: Kimmorley (2); Doherty; Zisti; Goals: K Iro (2); Swain (1)	Attendance: 5,214; Referee: Bill Harrigan

== Final ==
1997 World Club Championship final
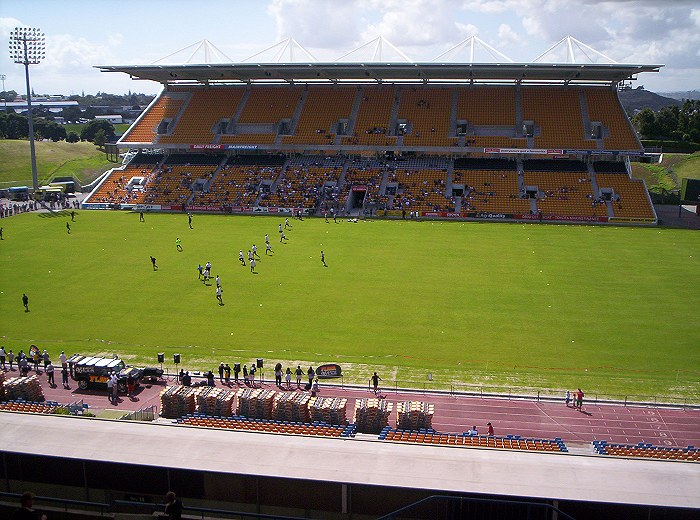
- Mount Smart Stadium hosted the match
Brisbane Broncos	Hunter Mariners
(SL (Australia) )	(SL (Australia) )
36	12
	1	2	Total
BRI	26	10	36
HUN	4	8	12
- Date: 18 October 1997
- Stadium: Mount Smart Stadium
- Location: Auckland, New Zealand
- Referee: Graham Annesley (Australia)
- Attendance: 10,300

Broadcast partners
- Broadcasters: (Australia) Fox Sports / Nine Network; (United Kingdom) Sky Sports
- Commentators: Warren Boland; Brent Todd; Peter Mulholland

In their only year of existence, this would be the only final that the Hunter Mariners would appear in.

Three tries in 12 minutes from Brisbane Broncos centre Darren Smith put the Broncos in a strong position in the first half to lead 26–0 inside 30 minutes, with the Hunter Mariners only score a try to Nick Zisti just before the break.

After the interval, the Mariners came close to scoring, but were denied twice by the video referee. John Carlaw and Zisti would score tries to reduce the margin to 14 points, but two late tries to the Broncos through Wendell Sailor and Steve Renouf gave the Brisbane side a dominant victory.

The Broncos collected A$1 million for winning the competition, with the Mariners collecting A$500,000 which the club split 50-50 with the players.

=== Teams ===
Brisbane Broncos	Hunter Mariners

FB	1	Darren Lockyer
RW	18	Michael De Vere
RC	13	Darren Smith
LC	4	Steve Renouf
LW	5	Wendell Sailor
FE	6	Kevin Walters
HB	7	Allan Langer (c)
PR	21	Shane Webcke
HK	9	John Plath
PR	23	Andrew Gee
SR	11	Gorden Tallis
SR	10	Brad Thorn
LK	12	Peter Ryan
Substitutions:
IC	14	Ben Walker
IC	2	Michael Hancock
IC	15	Tonie Carroll
IC	33	Phillip Lee
Coach:
(Australia) Wayne Bennett

FB	1	Robbie Ross
RW	3	Nick Zisti
LC	6	Brad Godden
RC	4	Kevin Iro
LW	5	John Carlaw
FE	21	Scott Hill
HB	20	Brett Kimmorley
PR	31	Anthony Brann
HK	9	Robbie McCormack (c)
PR	14	Troy Stone
SR	16	Darrien Doherty
SR	12	Paul Marquet
LK	55	Tyran Smith
Substitutions:
IC	2	Keith Beauchamp
IC	10	Tim Maddison
IC	11	Tony Iro
IC	18	Richard Swain
Coach:
(Australia) Graham Murray

=== Match details ===
1997 World Club Challenge Final

Friday, 17 October
19:30 NZST (UTC+12)

Brisbane Broncos	36 – 12	Hunter Mariners
Tries: 7 D Smith 18', 24', 28'; Walters 4'; Plath 12'; Sailor 74'; Renouf 79'; Goals: 4 De Vere 5', 13', 29' (3/5); Walker 75' (1/2)	1st: 26–4; 2nd: 10–8	Tries: 3 Zisti 35', 64'; Carlaw 53'; Goals: 0 K Iro (0/2); Swain (0/1)

Ericsson Stadium, Auckland
Attendance: 10,300
Referee: Graham Annesley (Australia)

== Aftermath ==
The dominance of the Australasian sides in the competition led to the Rugby Football League appointing Joe Lydon to head a commission to provide an explanation. The general conclusion was that the Australian sides were no more skillful than the European teams, the main difference as it had been in international football since the late 1970s, was fitness, something that they were working on by the time of the season ending Super League Test series between the Super League Australians and the Great Britain Lions in England in November.

== See also ==
- World Club Challenge
- Super League (Australia) season 1997
- Super League II
- Brisbane Broncos 1997
