= Peter Mulholland =

Australian rugby league footballer & coach (c.1953–2021)

Personal information
- Born: c. 1953 Camden, New South Wales, Australia
- Died: 16 December 2021 (aged 68)

Playing information
- Position: Hooker
Club
Years	Team	Pld	T	G	FG	P
1973	Canterbury-Bankstown

Coaching information
Club
Years	Team	Gms	W	D	L	W%
1995–96	Western Reds	43	17	1	25	40
1997	Paris Saint-Germain	11	2	0	9	18
	Total	54	19	1	34	35

Peter Mulholland (c. 1953 – 16 December 2021) was an Australian rugby league football coach. He coached ARL premiership expansion club Western Reds in their first two seasons before moving to France to take up the coaching position of Super League expansion team, Paris Saint-Germain. Before moving to the Bulldogs, Mulholland was Assistant Coach from 1999 to 2001 and Director of Recruitment (2002–2008) at the Penrith Panthers.

== Playing career ==
A clever hooker with an uncanny knack for winning scrum possession, Mulholland had a brief stint for the Canterbury-Bankstown club in 1973. Playing in the Group 6 Rugby League competition, Mulholland had stints at Camden Rams RLFC, Oakdale Workers RLFC, Campbelltown City Kangaroos RLFC and Narellan Jets RLFC. Mulholland was instrumental in the Camden Rams 1978 Group 6 premiership victory over the Campbelltown RSL Warriors.

== Schoolboy coaching career ==
While playing in Group 6, Mulholland cut his coaching teeth under the watchful eye of Brother Silverius at St Gregory's College, Campbelltown. Over a period of 14 years from 1979 to 1993, Mulholland would establish 'St Gregs' as Australia's pre-eminent Rugby League school. Indeed, St Gregory's Campbelltown still hold the record for national schoolboy rugby league championships with 9 title victories.

Peter Mulholland Schoolboy Rugby League Coaching Record

- 1979
- 1980
- 1981
- 1982
- 1983 Commonwealth Bank Cup Runners-up: Defeated by Patrician Brothers Fairfield 14–2
- 1984 Commonwealth Bank Cup Champions: St Gregory's defeated Christian Brothers Lewisham
- 1985
- 1986 Commonwealth Bank Cup Champions: St Gregory's defeated Christian Brothers Lewisham
- 1987
- 1988 Commonwealth Bank Cup Quarter Finalists (defeated by Parramatta Marist)
- 1989 Commonwealth Bank Cup Champions: St Gregory's d Holy Cross College, Ryde
- 1990 Commonwealth Bank Cup Champions: St Gregory's d St. John's College Woodlawn
- 1991 Commonwealth Bank Cup Champions: St Gregory's d Fairfield Pats
- 1992 Commonwealth Bank Cup Semi Finalists (defeated by Fairfield Pats)
- 1993 Commonwealth Bank Cup Champions: St Gregory's 27 d Wavell College (QLD) 6

Mulholland is still regarded as the doyen of schoolboy rugby league coaches. St Greg's has waned as a schoolboy rugby league power since 1993. So immediate was the effect of Mulholland's departure upon the school's fortunes, St Gregory's were defeated by local minnows Eaglevale High in the 1st round of the 1994 Commonwealth Bank Cup, despite boasting a team studded with future NRL players like Trent Barrett, Peter Cusack, Simon Bonetti, Trent Robinson and Russell Richardson.

== Schoolboy players coached ==
During his tenure as head coach of St Gregory's 1st XIII, Mulholland coached future NSWRL stars like Jason Taylor, Ivan Henjak and Michael Potter. Mulholland also oversaw the development of many future 1st Graders like Matt Fuller, Michael Francis, Wayne Evans, Tim Horan and Damien Chapman.

== Grade coaching career ==
Mulholland's unrivalled success as a schoolboy mentor soon brought him to the attention of Sydney clubs competing in the NSWRL. Having fielded offers from Canterbury and Parramatta, Mulholland decided to stay local and assume the reins of the Western Suburbs Magpies U-21 team for the 1988 season, under head coach Laurie Freier.

Mulholland would coach lower grades with the Magpies until the end of the 1992 season, achieving mixed success.

Mulholland was poached by the North Sydney Bears to coach that club's Reserve Grade team for the 1993 season. Mulholland would take the next step with this team, winning the 1993 NSWRL Reserve Grade premiership with a narrow 5–4 victory over an Andrew Johns-led Newcastle Knights team.

== The Western Reds ==
At the conclusion of the 1992 season, the NSWRL announced its intention to admit three new clubs to the 1st Grade competition for 1995- the Western Reds, South Queensland Crushers and North Queensland Cowboys.

Mulholland was soon head-hunted by Reds CEO Gordon Allen to be the Western Reds foundation coach. Agreeing to terms midway through the 1993 season, Mulholland launched an audacious recruitment drive, luring Australian Kangaroos Brad Mackay and Mark Geyer to the golden west. With All Black test centre Craig Innes, Norwich Rising Star Matthew Rodwell and emerging test prop Rodney Howe in the depth chart, the Reds set a strong base for their debut season.

The Western Reds would win their first ever ARL match with a 28–16 victory over the St George Dragons in front of a sellout crowd at the WACA Ground. Ironically, former St Gregs prodigy Matt Fuller would score the Reds first try. Mulholland would make the famous quote post match: "we had 18 months to prepare for this game. Now we only have 7 days to prepare for the next." The Skull's words would come back to haunt him in Newcastle a week later when David Waite's Knights buckled the Reds by 48–6, in a battle of the schoolboy master coaches.

== Recruitment manager ==
Mulholland worked for NRL team, the Penrith Panthers during the period when they won the 2003 NRL Premiership. He started working for the Bulldogs' coaching staff in 2008. In August 2010 it was reported that Mulholland would be leaving Canterbury-Bankstown to spend the 2011 NRL season working as Wayne Bennett's recruitment manager when he moved to Nathan Tinkler's newly acquired Newcastle Knights. He was recruitment manager at the St. George-Illawarra Dragons during 2014-2015 and joined the Canberra Raiders in that capacity for the 2016 NRL season.

== Illness and death ==
In January 2019, Mulholland was diagnosed with a type of cancer known as Angioimmunoblastic T-cell lymphoma. After undergoing therapy, he went into remission before his cancer came back as a rare type of Non-Hodgkin b-cell lymphoma in 2021. His death from the illness, aged 68, was announced on 16 December 2021.
