= List of West Coast Pirates representatives =

Including players from the West Coast Pirates & Perth Reds that have represented while at the club and the years they achieved their honours, if known.

== International ==
=== Australia ===
- (Australia) Rodney Howe (1997)
- (Australia) Julian O'Neill (1997)

=== England ===
- (England) Barrie-Jon Mather (1997)

=== Ireland ===
- (Republic of Ireland) Shayne McMenemy (2008)

=== South Africa ===
- (South Africa) Halvor Harris (2015)
- (South Africa) Bradley Williams (2015)

== State of Origin ==
=== New South Wales ===
- (New South Wales) Brad Mackay (1995)

=== Queensland ===
- (Queensland) Julian O'Neill (1996)
