= Keith Beauchamp =

Keith Beauchamp may refer to:

- Keith Beauchamp (filmmaker) (born 1972), filmmaker based in Brooklyn
- Keith Beauchamp (rugby league) (born 1967), Australian rugby league footballer of the 1990s
