= List of New Zealand Warriors honours =

This article lists the achievements of the New Zealand Warriors (formerly Auckland Warriors) in the competitions they have competed in since 1995.

These lists encompass records from the:

- Australian Rugby League competition, 1995–1996
- Super League competitions, 1997
- National Rugby League competition, 1998–present

== Premierships ==
- The Warriors have never won a grand final.

== Runners-up ==
Year	Opponent	Competition	Score
2002	Sydney Roosters	National Rugby League	8-30
2011	Manly Warringah Sea Eagles	National Rugby League	10-24

== Minor premierships ==
Year	Competition	Wins
2002	National Rugby League	17

== Finals appearances ==
- National Rugby League: 2001, 2002, 2003, 2007, 2008, 2010, 2011, 2018
- In addition, the Warriors made the semi-finals of the World Club Challenge in 1997.
