= MFHS =

MFHS may refer to:

- Macquarie Fields High School, Sydney, New South Wales, Australia
- Many Farms High School, Many Farms, Arizona, United States
- Marion-Franklin High School, Columbus, Ohio, United States
- Maroa-Forsyth High School, Maroa, Illinois, United States
- Menomonee Falls High School, Menomonee Falls, Wisconsin, United States
