= Brad Godden =

Australia international rugby league footballer

Personal information
- Full name: Bradley Godden
- Born: 13 July 1969 (age 57) Newcastle, New South Wales, Australia

Playing information
- Position: Fullback, Centre, Wing
Club
Years	Team	Pld	T	G	FG	P
1991–96	Newcastle Knights	89	17	0	0	68
1997	Hunter Mariners	11	2	0	0	4
1998–99	Leeds Rhinos	51	19	0	0	76
	Total	151	38	0	0	148
Representative
Years	Team	Pld	T	G	FG	P
1992	Australia

Bradley Godden (born 13 July 1969) is an Australian former professional rugby league footballer who played in the 1990s. He played for the Newcastle Knights, Hunter Mariners, and the Leeds Rhinos as a fullback, wing or centre.

== Playing career ==
=== Australia ===
Godden started his first grade career with the Newcastle Knights, playing from the bench in a 30–0 loss to the Parramatta Eels at Parramatta Stadium in round 14 of the 1991 NSWRL season. He played just four games for the Knights in 1991, scoring his first try from fullback in round 19 at Marathon Stadium in a 32–16 win over the South Sydney Rabbitohs.

Godden's form at fullback for the Knights was one of the reason's Newcastle qualified for their first finals series in 1992. Representative players Mark Sargent, Paul Harragon, Michael Hagan and Robbie McCormack led the Knights to a 4th-placed finish in the regular season. They then accounted for Western Suburbs 21–2 in the minor preliminary semi-final, with Godden scoring just his third try for the season, before going down to eventual grand finalist St. George 2–3 in a rare low scoring encounter in the minor semi-final.

After starring at fullback for the Knights in the 1992 finals series, Godden gained selection for Australia for the 1992 World Cup in England. He played in one of the three preliminary matches on the tour, but wasn't selected for the final at Wembley Stadium, coach Bob Fulton preferring Balmain youngster Tim Brasher instead.

Godden continued with the Knights until the end of the 1996 season. He was able to stay in Newcastle though as a member of the new Hunter Mariners team who played in the new Super League competition. However, the emergence of Robbie Ross saw Godden restricted to 11 games for the Mariners only season of existence. Godden also played for the Mariners in the 1997 World Club Championship Final against the Brisbane Broncos in Auckland. It was the Hunter Mariners final game as a club.

=== England ===
Godden then linked with the Leeds Rhinos in 1998, playing centre in their 1998 Super League Grand Final loss to Wigan Warriors. After playing at centre for Leeds throughout the 1999 season, where he scored seven tries in 24 games, Godden retired from playing at the age of 31. Godden's final game for Leeds was their 1999 Challenge Cup final victory over the London Broncos which Leeds won 52–16 with Godden scoring a try in the game.
