= Robin Thorne =

Australian rugby league footballer

Personal information
- Full name: Robin Thorne
- Born: 26 March 1966 (age 60) Roma, Queensland, Australia

Playing information
- Position: Wing
Club
Years	Team	Pld	T	G	FG	P
1988–89	Canterbury-Bankstown	38	8	0	0	32
1991–94	Gold Coast	44	7	0	0	28
1996	Western Reds	1	0	0	0	0
	Total	83	15	0	0	60
- Source: As of 1 February 2019

Robin "Robbie" Thorne (born 26 March 1966) is an Australian former professional rugby league footballer who played in the 1980s and 1990s. Thorne primarily played as a winger. The teams he played for at a club level were: the Canterbury-Bankstown Bulldogs (1988−89), the Gold Coast (1991−94), and the Western Reds (1996).

== Background ==
Thorne was born in Roma, Queensland.

== Playing career ==
Thorne made his first grade debut for Canterbury in Round 4 1988 against Canberra scoring a try in a 22–17 win. Thorne played on the wing for Canterbury in their 1988 NSWRL grand final victory over Balmain.

In 1991, Thorne joined the Gold Coast and played 4 years there with 3 of those seasons seeing the club finish last on the table claiming the wooden spoon in 1991, 1992 and 1993. In 1996, Thorne joined newly admitted side the Western Reds but only played 1 game for the club which was against Brisbane in Round 9 1996. This would prove to be Thorne's last game in first grade.
