= Reimis Smith =

New Zealand rugby league footballer

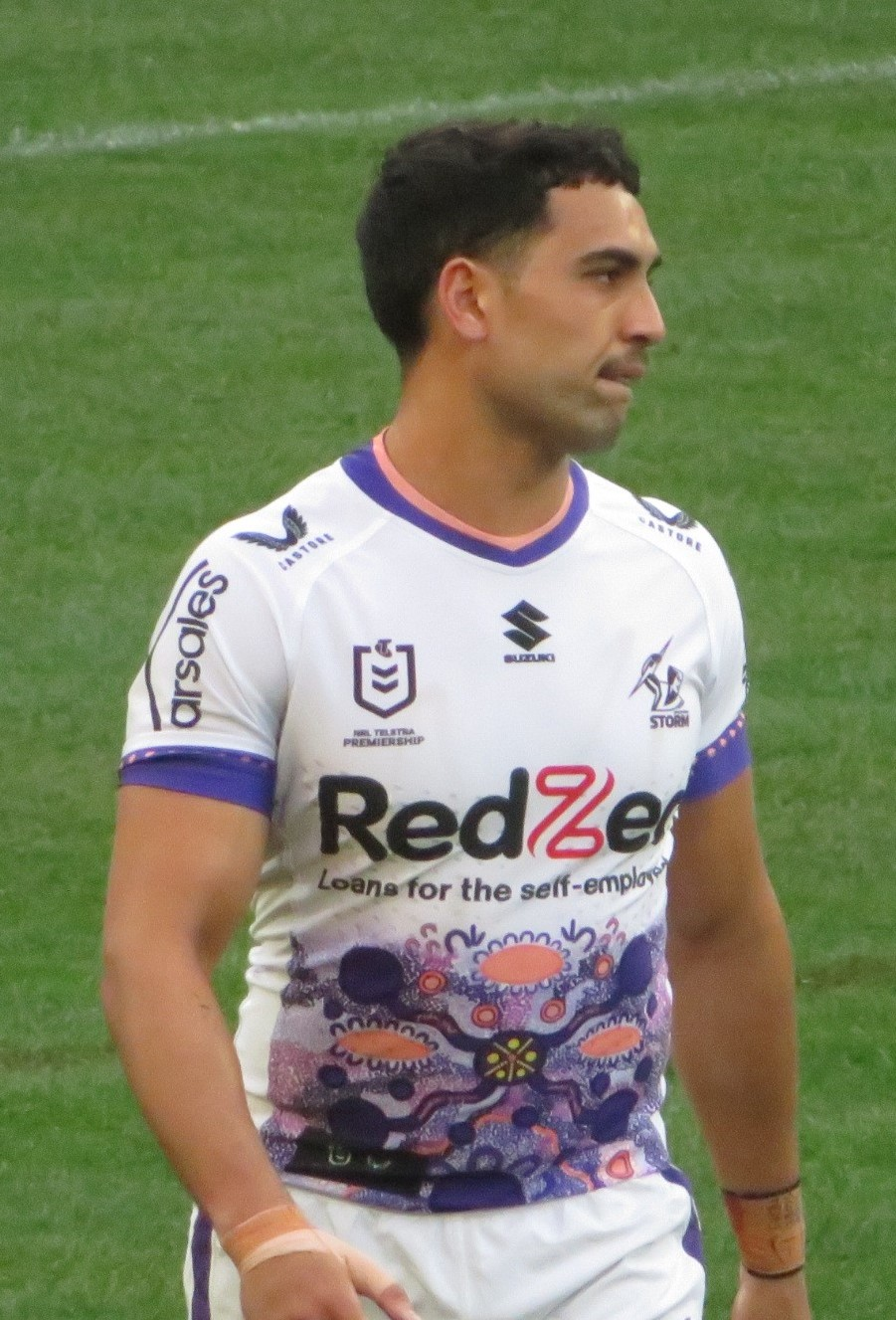

Personal information
- Born: 13 May 1997 (age 29) Sydney, New South Wales, Australia
- Height: 196 cm (6 ft 5 in)
- Weight: 97 kg (15 st 4 lb)

Playing information
- Position: Centre, Wing
Club
Years	Team	Pld	T	G	FG	P
2016–20	Canterbury Bulldogs	49	25	0	0	100
2021–24	Melbourne Storm	68	25	0	0	100
2024–25	Catalans Dragons	26	11	0	0	24
	Total	143	61	0	0	224
- Source: As of 31 October 2025
- Father: Tyran Smith
- Relatives: Anthony Mundine (uncle)

Reimis Smith (born 13 May 1997) is a New Zealand professional rugby league footballer who last played as a centre for the Catalans Dragons in the Super League.

He previously played for the Canterbury-Bankstown Bulldogs and Melbourne Storm as a winger in the NRL and has played for New Zealand 9s at international level.

== Background ==
Smith was born in Sydney, New South Wales, Australia, and is of Māori and Indigenous Australian descent. Smith is the son of former New Zealand international Tyran Smith, and the nephew of boxer and former professional rugby league footballer Anthony Mundine.

Smith played his junior rugby league for the Mascot Jets and for the South Sydney Harold Matthews team. He was educated at Matraville Sports High School and then being signed by the Parramatta Eels in 2013.

== Playing career ==
=== Early career ===
In 2015, Smith played for the Parramatta Eels' NYC team, before joining the Canterbury-Bankstown Bulldogs mid-season.

=== 2016 – 2020: Canterbury-Bankstown Bulldogs ===
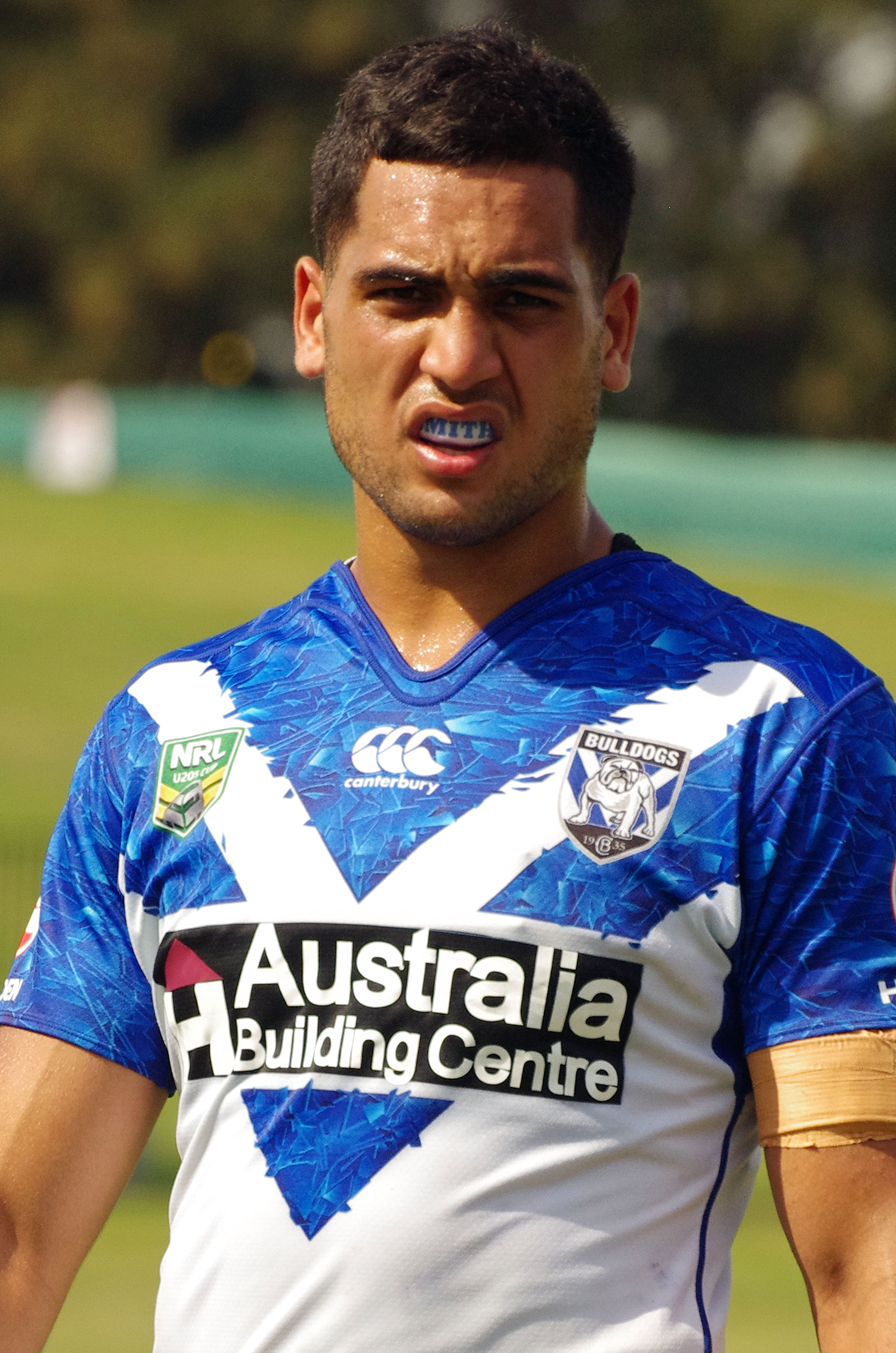
Smith playing for the Bulldogs in 2016

On 7 May, Smith played for the Junior Kiwis against the Junior Kangaroos. In Round 12 of the 2016 NRL season, he made his NRL debut for Canterbury against Canberra, scoring two tries. He had played for the clubs Intrust Super Premiership NSW side the day before, but due to regular Canterbury centre Josh Morris being called up to the New South Wales State of Origin side on the day of the NRL game, Smith was called up and had to drive from Sydney to Canberra to make the game.

Smith spent 2017 playing for Canterbury's NSW Cup team, making no appearances for the first-grade team. On 6 May, Smith again played at centre for the Junior Kiwis against Junior Kangaroos in the 46–22 loss at Canberra Stadium.

in 2018, following the mid-season departure of Moses Mbye to the Wests Tigers, Smith earned a recall into Canterbury's first-grade team on the wing as Will Hopoate shifted from centre to fullback to fill in the void. He made his first appearance of the season in Round 15 against the Gold Coast Titans, playing on the wing. In Round 24 against the St George Illawarra Dragons, Smith scored a hat-trick of tries in Canterbury's shock upset 38–0 win at Jubilee Oval. He finished the season with 11 matches and 7 tries. On 3 September, he was selected in the New Zealand Kiwis training squad but did not make the final 24-man squad. On 3 October, Smith extended his contract with Canterbury to the end of the 2020 NRL season.

In Round 8 of the 2019 NRL season against Manly-Warringah, Smith scored two tries in a 18–10 defeat at Brookvale Oval. In Round 19, Smith scored two tries in a 20–12 loss against the Sydney Roosters at ANZ Stadium.

In Round 23 against arch rivals Parramatta, Smith was placed on report and then sent to the sin bin in the second half of the match after headbutting Parramatta player Maika Sivo during Canterbury's upset 12–6 victory at the Western Sydney Stadium.

On 11 November, Smith signed a contract extension to stay at Canterbury until the end of the 2021 season.

Smith played 14 games for Canterbury in the 2020 NRL season scoring four tries. The club finished in 15th place on the table, only avoiding the Wooden Spoon by for and against over bottom side Brisbane. On 13 November, Smith was granted a release by Canterbury to join reigning premiers, Melbourne.

=== 2021 – 2024: Melbourne Storm ===
Smith played a total of 25 games for Melbourne in the 2021 NRL season as the club won 19 matches in a row and claimed the Minor Premiership. Smith played in two finals matches including the preliminary final where Melbourne suffered a shock 10–6 loss against eventual premiers Penrith.

In round 9 of the 2022 NRL season, Smith was taken from the field during Melbourne's victory over St. George Illawarra. It was later announced Smith would miss 10–12 weeks with a torn pectoral injury.

Smith made 22 appearances for Melbourne in the 2023 NRL season including the club's preliminary final loss against Penrith. He would score five tries for the season, forming a partnership on the right edge with rookie winger Will Warbrick. Smith also made three appearances for the Brisbane Tigers in the Queensland Cup during the 2023 season.

On 31 July 2024, it was announced that Smith had been granted an immediate release from his contract to take up an opportunity elsewhere.

=== 2024 – 2025: Catalans Dragons ===
On 1 August 2024, it was reported that he had joined Super League club Catalans Dragons for the remainder of the season. On 1 September 2025, Smith announced he would be retiring from the sport at the end of the season.

== Statistics ==
Year	Team	Games	Tries	Pts
2016	Canterbury-Bankstown Bulldogs	1	2	8
2018	Canterbury-Bankstown Bulldogs	11	7	28
2019	Canterbury-Bankstown Bulldogs	23	12	48
2020	Canterbury-Bankstown Bulldogs	14	4	16
2021	Melbourne Storm	25	14	56
2022	Melbourne Storm	9	1	4
2023	Melbourne Storm	22	5	20
2024	Melbourne Storm	12	5	20
2024	Catalans Dragons	5	0	0
2025	Catalans Dragons	17	9	36
	Totals	136	56	224
