= David Boyd (rugby league) =

Australian rugby league footballer

Personal information
- Full name: David Boyd
- Born: 13 May 1966 (age 59)

Playing information
- Position: Second-row, Prop
Club
| Years | Team | Pld | T | G | FG | P |
|---|---|---|---|---|---|---|
| 1986–87 | Canterbury Bulldogs | 8 | 0 | 0 | 0 | 0 |
| 1988–93 | Newcastle Knights | 114 | 8 | 1 | 0 | 34 |
| 1993–94 | Halifax Blue Sox | 30 | 1 | 0 | 0 | 4 |
| 1995–96 | Western Reds | 35 | 1 | 0 | 0 | 4 |
| 1997–98 | Hull FC | 32 | 3 | 0 | 0 | 12 |
| | Total | 219 | 13 | 1 | 0 | 54 |

David Boyd (born 13 May 1966) is a former professional rugby league footballer who played in the 1980s and 1990s. He played for the Canterbury-Bankstown Bulldogs from 1986 to 1987, he was part of the inaugural Newcastle Knights squad from 1988 to 1993 and then finished his career at the Western Reds from 1995 to 1996.

== Playing career ==
Boyd made his debut for Canterbury-Bankstown in Round 12, 1986. Boyd played in the club's 4-2 grand final loss against Parramatta, with his high tackle on Parramatta's Ray Price resulting in a penalty goal for the Eels that proved to be their winning points. In 1988, Boyd joined Newcastle and was a foundation player of the club. Boyd played in the club's first ever game which ended in a 28–4 loss to Parramatta.

In 1993, Boyd signed with English club Halifax Blue Sox and spent two seasons with them before returning to Australia in 1995 signing with newly admitted club the Western Reds.

Boyd played in the club's first-ever match, a 28–16 victory over St. George, scoring a try in the game. Boyd played with the club until the end of 1996. Between 1997 and 1998, Boyd played for Hull FC before retiring from the game.
