= Shaun Devine =

Australian rugby league footballer

Personal information
- Born: 4 April 1970 (age 55) Australia

Playing information
- Position: Fullback
Club
Years	Team	Pld	T	G	FG	P
1990–93	Western Suburbs	43	5	17	2	56
1995–97	Western Reds	23	4	8	0	32
	Total	66	9	25	2	88
- Source: RLP

Shaun Devine is an Australian former professional rugby league footballer who played professionally for the Western Suburbs Magpies and the Western Reds.

== Playing career ==
Devine played for the Western Suburbs Magpies between 1990 and 1993 in the NSWRL Premiership. In 1994 he played for the Rockingham Coastal Sharks in the Western Australia Rugby League competition. He then played for the new Western Reds franchise between 1995 and 1997.

In 2008, he was involved in the formation of the Hinterland Storm club in the Bycroft Cup on the Gold Coast.
