= John Chapman (rugby league) =

Australian rugby league footballer

Personal information
- Full name: John Chapman
- Born: 1954 (age 71–72) Blayney, New South Wales

Playing information
- Height: 5 ft 10 in (1.78 m)
- Weight: 13 st 0 lb (83 kg)
- Position: Wing
Club
Years	Team	Pld	T	G	FG	P
1973–78	St. George Dragons	126	39	14	0	145
1979–80	Parramatta Eels	19	4	0	0	12
	Total	145	43	14	0	157
Representative
Years	Team	Pld	T	G	FG	P
1972	New South Wales	3	2	0	0	6
1972	NSW Country	1	0	0	0	0
- Relatives: Damien Chapman (son)

John Chapman is an Australian former rugby League footballer who played in the 1970s and 1980s. He was a premiership winner in Sydney's 1977 NSWRFL season.

== Career ==
Originally from Blayney, New South Wales, Chapman represented N.S.W. Country as an 18-year-old in 1972 before moving to St. George in 1973. He played six seasons for St. George between 1973 and 1978 which included three grand final appearances. He played on the wing in the losing 1975 Grand Final team.

Chapman won a premiership with St. George in 1977. He played on the wing in the 1977 Grand Final Draw against Parramatta and missed a penalty kick for goal in the dying seconds of extra time, sending the drawn match to a replay. The following Wednesday in the 1977 Grand Final Replay the Dragons beat Parramatta 22-0 and Chapman became at premiership winner.

He left St. George and joined Parramatta for two seasons in 1979–1980, before finishing career at the Brisbane club, Redcliffe.
