= Andrew Neave =

Australian rugby league player

Personal information
- Full name: Andrew Neave
- Born: 2 June 1970 (age 54); Brisbane, Queensland, Australia
- Height: 176 cm (5 ft 9 in)
- Weight: 76 kg (12 st 0 lb)

Playing information
- Position: Hooker
Club
Years	Team	Pld	T	G	FG	P
1989–93	Easts Tigers
1994–95	Cronulla Sharks	32	8	0	0	32
1996	Western Reds	2	1	0	0	4
	Total	34	9	0	0	36

Andrew Neave (born 2 June 1970) is an Australian former professional rugby league player who played in the 1990s. He played for the Cronulla-Sutherland Sharks and the Western Reds. His position of choice was hooker.

== Playing career ==
A Brisbane junior, Neave started his rugby league career in 1989 playing for QRL side Easts Tigers in the Brisbane competition. In 1994, after five seasons with Easts, Neave along with Easts coach John Lang were signed by the Cronulla-Sutherland Sharks. He made his first grade debut in his side's 24−16 victory over the Canberra Raiders in round 1 of the 1994 season as a replacement for the injured Aaron Raper. Despite the Sharks narrowly missing out on finals qualification for the first time since 1989, finishing in 7th position, Neave had a brilliant rookie season, he played in all 22 of his side's games and scored 5 tries. Neave's stint with the Cronulla outfit ended at the conclusion of the 1995 season.

In 1996, Neave joined newly admitted side the Western Reds but only played two games for the club. The last of these games was in his side's 32−12 against the Canberra Raiders at the WACA Ground in round 9 1996. This would prove to be Neave's last game in first grade, as he was released by the Reds at the end of the 1996 season and never played first grade rugby league again. In total, Neave played 34 games and scored nine tries.
