= Hunter Mariners =

Defunct Australian rugby league club, based in Newcastle, NSW

Club information
- Full name: Hunter Mariners Rugby League Football Club
- Founded: 28 April 1995; 30 years ago
- Exited: 1997; 29 years ago

Former details
- Ground: Topper Stadium (11,000)
- Coach: Graham Murray
- Captain: Neil Piccinelli
- Competition: Super League
- 1997: 6th of 10

Records
- Premierships: 0
- Runners-up: 0
- Minor premierships: 0
- Wooden spoons: 0

The Hunter Mariners were an Australian professional rugby league club based in the Hunter Region's largest city, Newcastle. Hunter was formed in mid-1995 and was later disbanded at the end of 1997. The club was formed because of the Super League war, which was the rivalry between the traditional Australian Rugby League competition and the new media driven Super League competition. The team competed in the inaugural and only Super League season in 1997, as well as that year's World Club Challenge.

The Mariners faced much adversity in the Newcastle region because of the Australian Rugby League's Newcastle Knights team being already well established in the region. The club played its home games at Topper Stadium and missed out on the finals of the 1997 Super League season, but made the grand final of the World Club Challenge. The team was overshadowed by the Newcastle Knights who won the ARL competition and were admitted into the 1998 re-united competition.

The Mariners were disbanded after being left out of the new competition because they believed that the Hunter region could not support two entities. Six of the Mariners first grade squad would relocate to Super League's new frontier team to debut in the NRL, the Melbourne Storm.

== History ==
=== Formation ===
The New South Wales Rugby League competition (NSWRL) had been formed in 1908 as the first rugby league competition in Australia. There was a Newcastle based club in the first two seasons of the Sydney-based competition, but they eventually left to form their own Newcastle Rugby League competition. It was not until 1988 that another Newcastle based team was admitted into the NSWRL. In 1995, the Australian Rugby League (ARL) took control of the competition amid the beginning of the Super League war. It was then that News Limited began proposing and deliberating a rival rugby league competition and the twenty teams which competed in the 1995 ARL season were split between the Super League and ARL competitions.

The Newcastle Knights, the Newcastle-based team formed in 1988, aligned itself with the ARL and the new Super League competition was left without a Newcastle-based team. The Super League then established their own Newcastle-based team. The financially successful Newcastle Wests Leagues Club was given a licence to form a club for the 1996 inaugural Super League season.

In July 1995, it was officially announced that the Newcastle-based team would be called the "Hunter Mariners". However, in the middle of 1995, members of the Newcastle Wests Leagues Club did not want the club involved in the rebel competition, and the club held a meeting after 5,000 fans signed a petition objecting to the club's involvement. After this, and when local unions became involved in the protest, the Leagues Club abandoned the licence. The club then became owned and supported by News Limited.

In early 1996, the Hunter Mariners club was officially launched, without a home ground, but on that same day the Super League was banned from running its rebel competition. Originally the Mariners were allowed to use the Newcastle Knights home ground Marathon Stadium by the Showground Trust, but the Supreme Court found that they had no rights to play there. The club eventually played at Topper Stadium, sharing the ground with the National Soccer League's Newcastle Breakers, and used over $1 million to upgrade facilities at the stadium. After an appeal in mid-1996, the Super League was officially allowed to run the competition, which began in 1997.

=== 1997 Super League Telstra Cup ===
The Mariners lost their first three games of the premiership season, their first a narrow loss on their home ground. However, after the first loss at home, the Mariners were able to win seven consecutive matches at Topper Stadium. Despite this home ground record, Mariners were never able to win away from home. They lost all nine matches played away from their stadium, and subsequently missed out on the finals for the Super League season.

The Mariners were able to produce some representative players throughout their one season. Noel Goldthorpe and Robbie Ross were selected in the Super League Tri-series and Goldthorpe scored the winning points for New South Wales in the final of that series. Tyran Smith, Tony Iro and Kevin Iro were all selected for the New Zealand representative team. While mid-year find Brett Kimmorley was the club's sole selection for Australia in the Super League Test series against Great Britain.

Round	Home	Score	Away	Date	Venue	Crowd
1	Hunter Mariners	16–20	Canterbury Bulldogs	2 March 1997	Topper Stadium	6,579
2	Auckland Warriors	18–14	Hunter Mariners	8 March 1997	Mount Smart Stadium	20,300
3	Adelaide Rams	10–8	Hunter Mariners	14 March 1997	Adelaide Oval	27,435
4	Hunter Mariners	38–10	North Qld Cowboys	22 March 1997	Topper Stadium	6,090
5	Canberra Raiders	18–12	Hunter Mariners	30 March 1997	Bruce Stadium	15,650
6	Penrith Panthers	36–24	Hunter Mariners	4 April 1997	Penrith Stadium	8,926
7	Hunter Mariners	18–10	Auckland Warriors	12 April 1997	Topper Stadium	7,719
8	Hunter Mariners	36–16	Perth Reds	18 April 1997	Topper Stadium	4,139
9	Cronulla Sharks	26–0	Hunter Mariners	26 April 1997	Endeavour Stadium	12,284
10	Canterbury Bulldogs	48–36	Hunter Mariners	12 May 1997	Belmore Sports Ground	7,126
11	Hunter Mariners	30–6	Penrith Panthers	16 May 1997	Topper Stadium	2,198
12	Hunter Mariners	24–6	Brisbane Broncos	30 May 1997	Topper Stadium	7,124
13	Hunter Mariners	16–12	Canberra Raiders	27 June 1997	Topper Stadium	7,404
14	Hunter Mariners	10–2	Adelaide Rams	5 July 1997	Topper Stadium	2,345
15	North Qld Cowboys	33–14	Hunter Mariners	13 July 1997	Willows Stadium	11,480
16	Perth Reds	30–22	Hunter Mariners	10 August 1997	WACA Ground	5,083
17	Brisbane Broncos	34–16	Hunter Mariners	18 August 1997	QE II Stadium	13,830
18	Hunter Mariners	16–28	Cronulla Sharks	24 August 1997	Topper Stadium	5,122

=== 1997 World Club Championship ===
The Super League had also begun a rugby league competition in England, and they had created a mixed competition, encompassing Super League clubs from Australia, New Zealand, France and England, known as the World Club Challenge. The 1997 World Club Championship was held in order to crown "the best club in the world". The Mariners were a part of Australasia's group B and competed in England, before returning to complete the Australian part of the competition. The Mariners won all three games in England, over Paris Saint-Germain, Castleford and Sheffield. They returned home to again win the three games at Topper Stadium and therefore made the finals of the competition.

The finals system meant that they would have to play their finals match in England against English Super League club Wigan. The Mariners shocked the club and the world of rugby league by winning 22–18. That score line would again be repeated in the grand final qualifier against Australian club Cronulla, another match the Mariners were expected to lose. But the Mariners were able to defeat the Australian Super League runners-up to take themselves to the grand final of the competition. Against the winners of the Super League grand final, Brisbane, the Mariners were blown away by the competition favourites. In what would be their final rugby league match as a club, the Mariners were down at half-time 26–4 and the final scoreline of 36–12 prevented the Mariners taking out a A$1 million prize.

Round	Home	Score	Away	Date	Venue	Crowd
Group	Paris Saint-Germain	12–28	Hunter Mariners	8 June 1997	Stade Sébastien Charléty	3,500
Group	Castleford Tigers	12–42	Hunter Mariners	13 June 1997	Wheldon Road	3,087
Group	Sheffield Eagles	4–40	Hunter Mariners	20 June 1997	Don Valley Stadium	2,350
Group	Hunter Mariners	26–8	Castleford Tigers	20 July 1997	Topper Stadium	3,379
Group	Hunter Mariners	32–4	Paris Saint-Germain	27 July 1997	Topper Stadium	2,210
Group	Hunter Mariners	58–12	Sheffield Eagles	3 August 1997	Topper Stadium	1,965
QF	Wigan Warriors	18–22	Hunter Mariners	3 October 1997	Central Park	9,553
SF	Cronulla Sharks	18–22	Hunter Mariners	11 October 1997	Shark Park	5,214
F	Brisbane Broncos	36–12	Hunter Mariners	17 October 1997	Mount Smart Stadium	12,000

=== Demise ===
The agreement of the ARL and Super League was to unify and become one competition, to be known as the National Rugby League (NRL), was that only twenty teams would compete in the competition in 1998. This meant that three of the twenty-two teams from both competitions were to be omitted with the addition of a new team franchise based in Melbourne. With the other Newcastle-based team, the Newcastle Knights winning the 1997 premiership, they were admitted into the new competition, however the NRL saw that two Newcastle based teams would not be financially viable.

Late in 1997, the club was offered to merge with Gold Coast-based team the Gold Coast Chargers, which would be known as the Gold Coast Mariners and would be based in the Gold Coast. However the Gold Coast party withdrew late to go alone in the 1998 competition, and while the Mariners tried to do the same, they, along with South Queensland Crushers and Western Reds, were not admitted into the NRL competition, thus ending their tenure as a first-grade rugby league team.

== Representative players ==
Players from the Hunter Mariners that have represented other teams while at the club include Australian international Brett Kimmorley and New Zealand internationals Kevin Iro, Tony Iro and Tyran Smith. Robbie Ross and Noel Goldthorpe also played for New South Wales in the State of Origin.

== Players ==
In the Super League season, the Mariners used a total of twenty-nine players over the eighteen games.

Cap	Name	Nationality	Position	Career	Appearances	T	G	FG	P
1	Keith Beauchamp	(Australia)	Wing	1997	17	7	-	-	28
2	Justin Dooley	(Australia)	Prop	1997	4	-	-	-	-
3	Brad Godden	(Australia)	Centre	1997	11	2	-	-	8
4	Noel Goldthorpe	(Australia)	Halfback	1997	14	3	8	-	28
5	Scott Hill	(Australia)	Five-eighth	1997	18	2	-	-	8
6	Tony Iro	(New Zealand)	Second-row	1997	14	3	-	-	12
7	Tim Maddison	(Australia)	Prop	1997	16	1	-	-	4
8	Robbie McCormack	(Australia)	Hooker	1997	15	-	-	-	-
9	Paul Marquet	(Australia)	Second-row	1997	15	3	-	-	12
10	Neil Piccinelli	(Australia)	Lock, Second-row	1997	17	6	2	-	28
11	Willie Poching	(New Zealand)	Lock, Second-row	1997	13	3	1	-	14
12	Robbie Ross	(Australia)	Fullback	1997	16	5	-	-	20
13	Troy Stone	(Australia)	Prop	1997	18	1	-	-	4
14	Richard Swain	(New Zealand)	Hooker	1997	14	-	4	-	8
15	Gavin Thompson	(Australia)	Fullback, Wing	1997	12	3	-	-	12
16	Nick Zisti	(Australia)	Centre, Wing	1997	17	9	20	-	76
17	Anthony Brann	(Australia)	Prop	1997	16	-	-	-	-
18	John Carlaw	(Australia)	Centre, Wing	1997	8	-	-	-	-
19	Troy Miles	(Australia)		1997	3	1	-	-	4
20	Paul Sarpi	(Australia)		1997	1	-	-	-	-
21	Mike Dorreen	(New Zealand)	Centre	1997	3	1	-	-	4
22	Craig Kimmorley	(Australia)	Five-eighth	1997	1	-	-	-	-
23	Darrien Doherty	(Australia)	Second-row	1997	11	1	-	-	4
24	Robbie Bannister	(Australia)	Wing	1997	2	1	-	-	4
25	Brett Kimmorley	(Australia)	Halfback	1997	9	2	4	-	16
26	Steve Ebrill	(Australia)		1997	1	-	-	-	-
27	Craig Wise	(Australia)	Centre, Wing	1997	4	4	-	-	16
28	Kevin Iro	(New Zealand)	Centre	1997	4	1	2	-	8
29	Tyran Smith	(New Zealand)	Lock	1997	2	-	-	-	-

== Records and statistics ==
=== Individual records ===
Scott Hill, Peter Gregory, and Tony Stone share the record of playing all eighteen Super League games for the Mariners, being the players with the most first grade games. Nick Zisti, however is the Mariner's most prolific record holder, with the most first grade points for the team with 76 points. This encompasses the most tries for the team with nine as well as most goals with twenty. Zisti has the most tries and goals in a match with three and five scored respectively in a match. The Mariners have only had three representatives, Robbie Ross and Noel Goldthorpe represented New South Wales in the Super League Tri-series while Brett Kimmorley represented Australia in the Super League test matches.

=== Team honours ===
Their home ground success, winning seven from nine matches, was never able to attract decent figure crowds, their highest reaching 7,719. Compared with the Super League competition average of 12,347 and the nearby Newcastle Knights had an average of 14,257 home attendances. With crowds at these levels, the Mariners were unsuccessfully competing in the Newcastle area.

Season	Pld	W	D	L	PF	PA	PD	W%	Position
1997 Super League season	18	7	0	11	350	363	−13	38.89%	6/10
1997 World Club Championship	9	8	0	1	282	120	+162	88.89%	2/22
Total	27	15	0	12	632	483	+149	55.56%	
