= Gavin Thompson =

Australian rugby league footballer

Personal information
- Born: Australia

Playing information
- Position: Fullback, Wing
Club
Years	Team	Pld	T	G	FG	P
1997	Hunter Mariners	12	3	0	0	12
- Source: RLP

Gavin Thompson is an Australian former professional rugby league footballer who played professionally for the Hunter Mariners.

== Playing career ==
Thompson spent the 1997 season with the new Hunter Mariners franchise in the 1997 Telstra Premiership. He played in 12 first grade matches for the club, starting at both fullback and on the wing. During the season he scored three tries.

Thompson spent the 1998 and 1999 seasons with the Cronulla Sharks but did not play a first grade game.
