= Darren Higgins =

Australian rugby league footballer

Personal information
- Full name: Darren Higgins
- Born: 1 September 1965 (age 59); Australia

Playing information
- Position: Centre, Wing
Club
Years	Team	Pld	T	G	FG	P
1988–90	St. George Dragons	20	3	0	0	12
1991–95	Cronulla Sharks	44	10	0	0	40
1996–97	Western Reds	27	4	0	0	16
1998	London Broncos	14	2	0	0	8
	Total	105	19	0	0	76

Darren Higgins (born 1965) is an Australian former professional rugby league footballer who played in the 1980s and 1990s.

== Playing career ==
Higgins began his career at St. George Dragons, where he played three seasons between 1988 and 1990. He was a reserve for the Dragons in their 1988 Panasonic Cup victory.

Higgins then moved to the Cronulla-Sutherland Sharks, and played five seasons for them between 1991 and 1995. He ended his Australian career with the Western Reds between 1996 and 1997, and finished his career at the London Broncos in 1998.
