= Peter Trevitt =

Australian rugby league footballer

Personal information
- Full name: Peter Trevitt

Playing information
- Position: Second-row, Lock
Club
| Years | Team | Pld | T | G | FG | P |
|---|---|---|---|---|---|---|
| 1991 | Western Suburbs | 1 | 0 | 0 | 0 | 0 |
| 1992–93 | Penrith Panthers | 5 | 0 | 0 | 0 | 0 |
| 1995–97 | Western Reds | 2 | 0 | 0 | 0 | 0 |
| | Total | 8 | 0 | 0 | 0 | 0 |
- Source: As of 23 December 2022

Peter Trevitt is an Australian former professional rugby league footballer who played in the 1990s. He played for Western Suburbs, Penrith and the Western Reds in the NSWRL/ARL competition and also the Super League.

== Playing career ==
Trevitt made his first grade debut for Western Suburbs in round 6 of the 1991 NSWRL season against Parramatta. Trevitt played off the interchange bench during a 47-12 victory at Parramatta Stadium. In 1992, Trevitt joined defending premiers Penrith and played four matches throughout the year. In 1993, he made the solitary first grade appearance, whilst in 1994 he was part of the squad but was not selected for first grade. In 1995, Trevitt joined the newly admitted Western Reds side and played one game for the club in their inaugural season. Trevitt made no appearances for the Western Reds in 1996 but made a return to the team in 1997 when the club were renamed the Perth Reds and competed in the breakaway Super League competition. At the end of 1997, the club was liquidated and Trevitt never played first grade rugby league again.
