= Tahi Reihana =

New Zealand rugby league footballer

Personal information
- Born: 15 March 1970 (age 56)

Playing information
- Position: Prop, Second-row
Club
Years	Team	Pld	T	G	FG	P
1995–96	Western Reds	6	1	0	0	4
1997–98	Bradford Bulls	45	0	0	0	0
	Total	51	1	0	0	4
Representative
Years	Team	Pld	T	G	FG	P
2000	Aotearoa Māori	3	0	0	0	0

Tahi Reihana (born 15 March 1970) is a New Zealand former professional rugby league footballer who played in the 1990s and 2000s in the Australian Rugby League premiership and Super League competitions.

== Playing career ==
Beginning his First Grade career in Group 2 where he represented in 1993, playing for North Coast and winning Coffs Harbour First Grade Players Player and Player of the Year. In 1994 Reihana was judged to be the Most Outstanding Player at the South Perth Lions rugby league club in the Western Australia Rugby League competition. In 1995 he made his first grade debut, playing for the new Western Reds franchise winning the Reserve Grade Players Player in 1995 and 1996.

In 1997 he moved to England, signing with the Bradford Bulls. He was a regular starter in the record 20 consecutive Super League wins, the current world record for top-level competition. Bradford released Reihana at the end of the 1998 season to make room in the overseas quota.

In 2000 Reihana was playing for Brisbane Souths in the Queensland Cup. He won the Pat Phelan Memorial Trophy as the club's player of the year when he was selected for the Aotearoa Māori side to contest the 2000 Rugby League World Cup. While playing for Brisbane Souths, Reihana made the Queensland Residents side in 1999 and 2000. He moved to the Wynnum Manly Seagulls in 2002, and again made the Residents side.

== Representative career ==
Reihana represented Aotearoa Māori at the 2000 World Cup, playing in three matches.
