= Tim Horan (rugby league) =

Australian rugby league footballer

Personal information
- Born: 30 November 1973 (age 51); Australia

Playing information
- Position: Wing, Centre, Five-eighth, Halfback
Club
Years	Team	Pld	T	G	FG	P
1992–94	South Sydney	17	5	0	0	20
1995–97	Western Reds	29	7	0	1	29
1998	Illawarra Steelers	3	0	1	0	2
	Total	49	12	1	1	51

Tim Horan is an Australian former professional rugby league footballer who played in the 1990s. He played for South Sydney, the Western Reds and Illawarra. He shares the same name as famous Australian Rugby Union player Tim Horan.

== Playing career ==
A utility player, Horan began his career with the South Sydney Rabbitohs in 1992. In his first two seasons with the club he alternated between starting at five eighth and coming from the bench, he first played at centre in 1993. During the 1994 season he was only used by the Rabbitohs in two matches and this prompted him to look for a new club in 1995.

Horan joined the Western Reds for their debut season in 1995 and played in the club's inaugural match on 12 March that year. He started at wing, centre, five eighth and halfback during the year, playing in nineteen of the club's matches. During the 1996 season Horan was only able to play one match, starting at centre, although he played in nine matches in 1997. The club folded at the end of the year.

He joined the Illawarra Steelers in 1998 and played in three matches as a halfback. The club formed a joint-venture with the St. George Dragons at the end of the season to form the St. George Illawarra Dragons but Horan was not selected to be part of the combined squad in 1999.
