= Shayne McMenemy =

Ireland international rugby league footballer

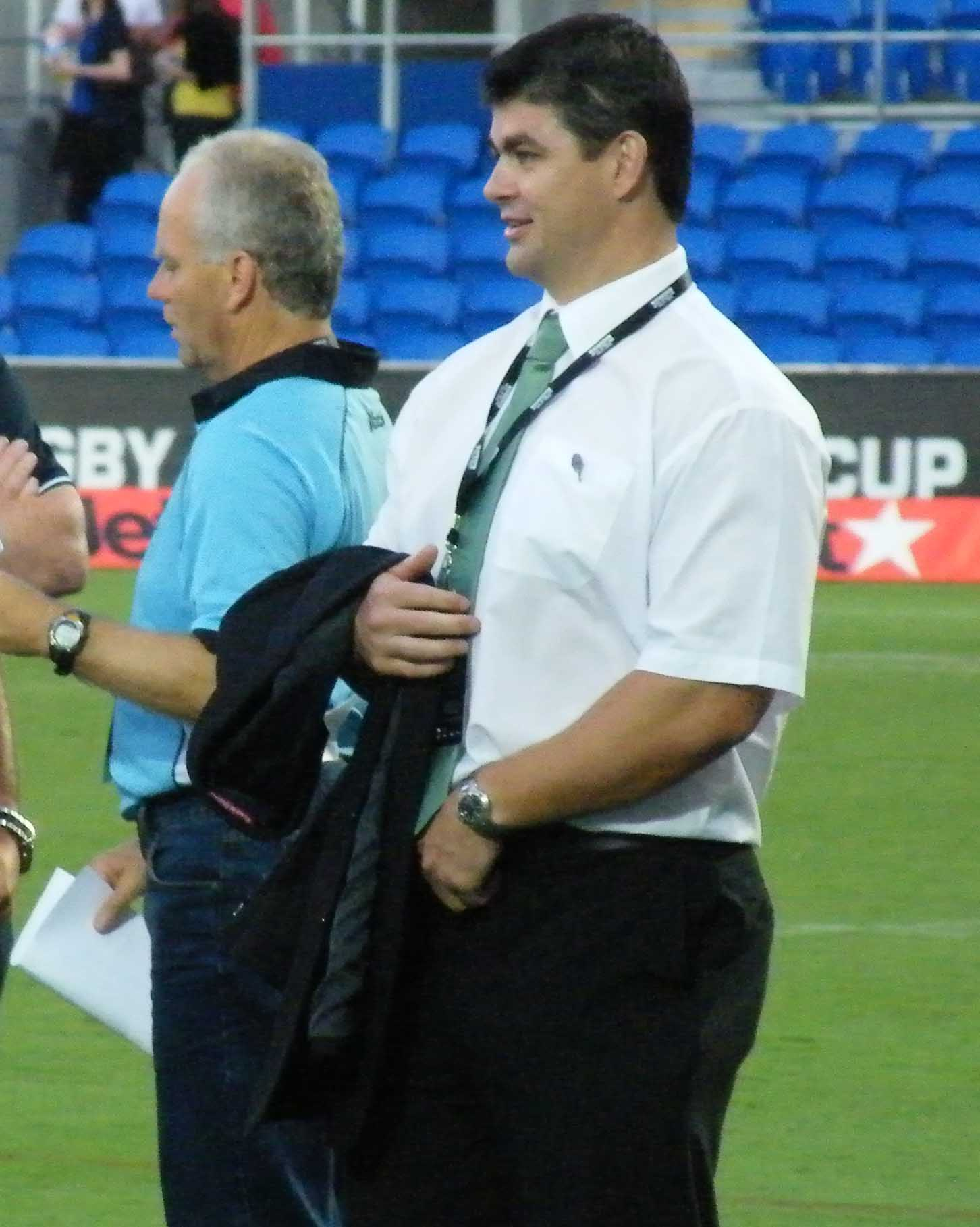
- McMenemy in 2008

Personal information
- Born: 19 July 1976 (age 49) Sydney, New South Wales, Australia

Playing information
- Height: 6 ft (1.83 m)
- Weight: 15 st 5 lb (98 kg)
- Position: Second-row
Club
Years	Team	Pld	T	G	FG	P
1997–99	Western Suburbs	31	1	1	0	6
2000	Oldham	26	8	5	1	43
2000–03	Halifax	80	13	10	0	72
2003–07	Hull FC	102	15	0	0	60
	Total	239	37	16	1	181
Representative
Years	Team	Pld	T	G	FG	P
2001–08	Ireland	10	1	0	0	4

Shayne McMenemy (born 19 July 1975) is a former Ireland international rugby league footballer who played as a back rower in the 1990s and 2000s. He played club football in Australia for the Western Suburbs Magpies and WA Reds, and in England for the Rochdale Hornets, Oldham, Halifax and Hull FC.

== Early years ==
McMenemy was born in Sydney, New South Wales, Australia. He attended Macquarie Fields High School in his early years, before attending St Gregory's College, Campbelltown.

== Playing career ==
=== Australia ===
A Macquarie Fields Hawks Junior, McMenemy made his first grade début in 1997 against the Balmain Tigers. The Magpies won the game against a Balmain Tigers team including Ellery Hanley and Paul Sironen.

McMenemy signed a scholarship at 14 and went on to play Harold Mathews, SG Ball, Jersey Flegg, Presidents Cup, Reserve Grade and first grade. McMenemy début in the Tommy Raudonikis era in the late 1990s. McMenemy mostly played second-row for the Magpies. A bad elbow injury finished off his career in 1999 and he joined the Super League.

=== England ===
McMenemy's English career started at Rochdale Hornets where he played a handful of games before moving onto Oldham. McMenemy was named Player of the Year and Clubman of the Year, and was selected in the Northern Ford Dream Team of the year. Oldham finished one game short of the grand final.

McMenemy signed on for Oldham for the 2001 season but only played one game before he transferred to Halifax. McMenemy was named player of the year in 2001 and Defensive player of the Year in 2002.

By mid-2003, Halifax were experiencing financial problems and McMenemy was signed by Hull FC midseason. Making his début against the Widnes Vikings, McMenemy dislocated his elbow and only appeared in a few games at the end of the season.

McMenemy played second-row for Hull FC, and was part of the winning 2005 Challenge Cup team at the Millennium Stadium, Cardiff against Leeds Rhinos, 25–24. McMenemy played a major role in the semi-final against St. Helens, scoring two tries in the 34–8.

Hull FC reached the 2006 Super League Grand final against St. Helens, and McMenemy played at second-row forward in his side's 4–26 loss at Old Trafford, Manchester.

McMenemy's career with Hull ended with a serious injury, when he dislocated his shoulder scoring against Wakefield Trinity Wildcats at Belle Vue, requiring season-ending surgery.

He was named in the Ireland training squad for the 2008 Rugby League World Cup. After not initially being selected for the final 24-man squad, he was called up as a replacement in the Ireland squad for the 2008 Rugby League World Cup.

In 2008 McMenemy returned to Australia to play in the Jim Beam Cup for WA Reds as captain-coach. He was included in the Jim Beam Cup NSW team in the Quad series.
