= Tyran Smith =

New Zealand international rugby league player

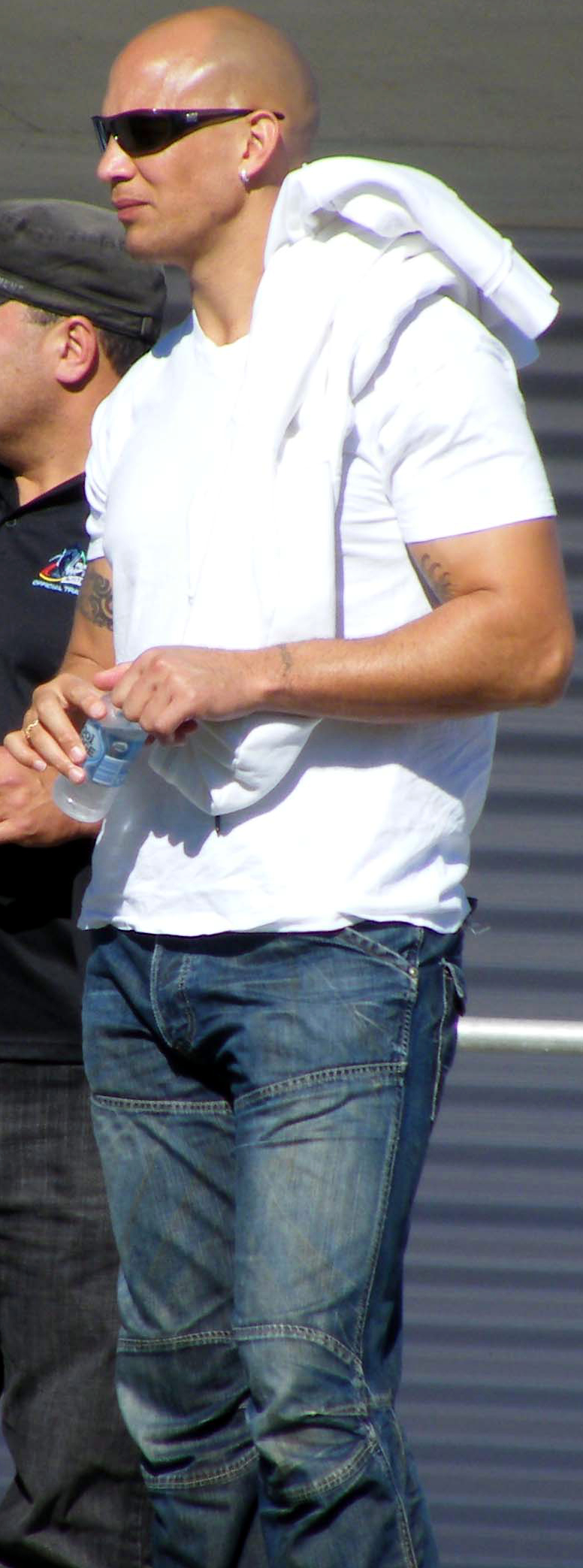

Personal information
- Full name: Tyran Carl Smith
- Born: 15 March 1974 (age 52) Auckland, New Zealand

Playing information
- Height: 197 cm (6 ft 6 in)
- Weight: 112 kg (17 st 9 lb)
- Position: Second-row, Lock
Club
| Years | Team | Pld | T | G | FG | P |
|---|---|---|---|---|---|---|
| 1993–96 | South Sydney | 52 | 8 | 0 | 0 | 32 |
| 1997 | North Qld Cowboys | 9 | 1 | 0 | 0 | 4 |
| 1997 | Hunter Mariners | 2 | 0 | 0 | 0 | 0 |
| 1998 | Auckland Warriors | 10 | 1 | 0 | 0 | 4 |
| 1999 | Balmain Tigers | 16 | 0 | 0 | 0 | 0 |
| 2000–01 | Wests Tigers | 42 | 6 | 0 | 0 | 24 |
| 2002–05 | Canberra Raiders | 57 | 5 | 0 | 0 | 20 |
| | Total | 188 | 21 | 0 | 0 | 84 |
Representative
| Years | Team | Pld | T | G | FG | P |
| 1996–00 | New Zealand | 10 | 1 | 0 | 0 | 4 |
| 2000 | Aotearoa Māori | 3 | 0 | 0 | 0 | 0 |
- Relatives: Reimis Smith (son); Anthony Mundine (brother-in-law)

Tyran Carl Smith (born 15 March 1974) is a New Zealand former rugby league footballer who played in the 1990s and 2000s.

He along with Darrien Doherty and Blake Green are the only three players in the game's history to date to have the distinction of playing first grade for seven different NRL clubs. He now works as a player agent.

== Playing career ==
Over a 13-season career, he played in the NSWRL Premiership, Australian Rugby League, Super League and finally the National Rugby League. During this time, he competed for a record seven clubs and represented both New Zealand and the Aotearoa Māori, competing for the later at the 2000 World Cup. He retired in 2005 with a long-term neck injury.

Smith made his first-grade debut for South Sydney in Round 17, 1993 against Manly-Warringah at the Sydney Football Stadium, with the match finishing in a 38-10 loss. Smith spent four years at Souths, although his time there was not very successful, with the club spending most of that period towards the bottom of the ladder.

Smith played for Souths in their upset 1994 Tooheys Challenge Cup final victory over Brisbane.

In 1997, Smith joined North Queensland who had joined the rival Super League competition during the Super League war. Smith then left North Queensland mid-season to join the Hunter Mariners. However, Smith only featured in two games for the club, including its final-ever game which was against the Cronulla-Sutherland Sharks in Round 18, 1997.

After the Hunter Mariners were liquidated, Smith joined the Auckland Warriors and featured in ten games for them before signing with the Balmain Tigers for the 1999 season, Balmain’s final year as a stand-alone entity before they merged with fellow foundation club Western Suburbs to form the Wests Tigers as part of the NRL's rationalisation strategy.

A member of the inaugural Wests Tigers side at the start of the 2000 season, Smith was named the club's player of the year.

In 2002, Smith joined the Canberra Raiders and spent four years at the club, including the Raiders’ 2003 and 2004 finals campaigns.

== Later years ==
Smith is the brother-in-law of fellow NRL footballer Anthony Mundine, having married his sister, Kellie.

He is now a Director of Sportsplayer Management alongside John Hopoate.

His son Reimis Smith is currently on the roster of the Catalan Dragons.
