= Neil Piccinelli =

Australian rugby league footballer

Personal information
- Born: 4 March 1967 (age 59) Sutherland, New South Wales, Australia

Playing information
- Position: Second-row, Lock
Club
Years	Team	Pld	T	G	FG	P
1989–96	Illawarra Steelers	145	28	21	0	154
1997	Hunter Mariners	17	6	2	0	28
1998	Newcastle Knights	26	6	0	0	24
	Total	188	40	23	0	206
- Source: As of 7 February 2019

Neil Piccinelli (/ˌpɪtʃɪˈnɛli/ PITCH-in-EL-ee; born 4 March 1967) is an Australian former professional rugby league footballer who played in the 1980s and 1990s.

He played with the Illawarra Steelers, Hunter Mariners and the Newcastle Knights. Most notable was his stint with the Steelers from 1989 to 1996. He was named in an Illawarra 25th anniversary "Team of Steel" at second row.

== Playing career ==
Piccinelli made his first grade debut for the Illawarra Steelers against the St. George Dragons in round 1 of the 1989 season. In 1992, Illawarra finished 3rd on the table and qualified for its first-ever finals campaign. Piccinelli played in all 3 finals games as Illawarra reached the preliminary final but fell short of a maiden grand final appearance, losing to St George 4–0.

Piccinelli played with Illawarra up until the end of 1996 and then joined the Hunter Mariners for the 1997 Super League season. Piccinelli played 17 games for the club in their only season before they were liquidated.

In 1998, Piccinelli joined defending premiers Newcastle in the reunified NRL competition. Piccinelli's final game in first grade was the elimination final loss against Canterbury during the 1998 finals series.
