= Craig Wise =

Australian rugby league footballer

Personal information
- Born: 15 September 1975 (age 49)

Playing information
- Position: Centre, Wing, Five-eighth, Lock
Club
Years	Team	Pld	T	G	FG	P
1997	Hunter Mariners	4	4	0	0	16
1998	Penrith Panthers	13	1	0	0	4
	Total	17	5	0	0	20

Craig Wise (born 15 September 1975) is an Australian former professional rugby league footballer who played for the Hunter Mariners and the Penrith Panthers.

Wise, who played in the lower grades for the Newcastle Knights, featured in the 1997 Super League season for the Hunter Mariners. He made four first-grade appearances for the Mariners, which included a club record-setting three tries in the round 11 win over the Penrith Panthers. In the 1998 NRL season, he switched to the Panthers, with the Mariners having been disbanded. In his only season at Penrith, he played in 13 premiership games.
