= Anthony Brann =

Australian rugby league player (born 1970)

Personal information
- Full name: Anthony Brann
- Born: 27 August 1970 (age 55) Sydney, New South Wales, Australia

Playing information
- Position: Prop
Club
| Years | Team | Pld | T | G | FG | P |
|---|---|---|---|---|---|---|
| 1996 | Balmain Tigers | 4 | 0 | 0 | 0 | 0 |
| 1997 | Hunter Mariners | 16 | 0 | 0 | 0 | 0 |
| 1998–00 | Canberra Raiders | 39 | 1 | 0 | 0 | 4 |
| | Total | 59 | 1 | 0 | 0 | 4 |
- Source: As of 25 January 2019

Anthony Brann (born 27 August 1970) is an Australian rugby league player who played in the 1990s and 2000s professionally for the Balmain Tigers, Hunter Mariners, and Canberra Raiders.

== Playing career ==
Brann made his first grade debut aged 26 for Balmain known then between 1995 and 1996 as the "Sydney Tigers" at the height of the Super League War against the Manly Warringah Sea Eagles in round 19 of the 1996 season.

In 1997, Brann joined the super league aligned Hunter Mariners and played in the club's first and only season. Brann also played in the club's final ever game, a 28–16 loss against the Cronulla Sharks.

In 1998, Brann joined Canberra playing 3 seasons with the club. It was at Canberra that Brann scored his only try in first grade which was against the Penrith Panthers. Brann retired from playing at the end of the 2000 season.
