= Tim Maddison =

Australian rugby league footballer

Personal information
- Full name: Tim Maddison
- Born: 26 July 1973 (age 52) Newcastle, New South Wales, Australia

Playing information
- Position: Second-row, Prop
Club
Years	Team	Pld	T	G	FG	P
1993–95	Newcastle Knights	12	0	0	0	0
1996	Eastern Suburbs	18	0	0	0	0
1997	Hunter Mariners	16	1	0	0	4
1998–00	Cronulla Sharks	40	2	0	0	8
2001–02	North Qld Cowboys	27	2	0	0	8
2003	Newcastle Knights	2	0	0	0	0
	Total	115	5	0	0	20
- Source: As of 15 January 2019

Tim Maddison (born 1973) is an Australian former professional rugby league footballer who played in the 1990s and 2000s. He played for the Newcastle Knights from 1993 to 1995 and 2003, then Eastern Suburbs in 1996, the Hunter Mariners in 1997, the Cronulla-Sutherland Sharks from 1998 to 2000 and finally the North Queensland Cowboys from 2001 to 2002, as a prop or second-row.

== Playing career ==
Maddison made his first grade debut for Newcastle in round 9 1993 against Cronulla. In 1996, Maddison joined Eastern Suburbs and made 18 appearances for the club, one of which was the qualifying final against Manly, this was the club's first finals appearance in a number of years.

In 1997, Maddison joined super league side the Hunter Mariners and played in the club's only season. After the liquidation of Hunter Mariners, Maddison joined Cronulla-Sutherland. In 1999, Maddison made 15 appearances for Cronulla as they won the minor premiership but the player did not feature in the club's unsuccessful finals campaign.

In 2001, Maddison joined North Queensland playing two seasons with the club before returning to Newcastle in 2003. During the 2002 NRL season, Maddison was suspended for ten matches after striking Sydney Roosters player Justin Holbrook. Maddison's final game in first grade was a 48–18 loss against Canterbury.

After leaving the Cowboys at the end of the 2002 season, he joined Pia Donkeys in France.
