= Nick Zisti =

Italy international rugby union & league footballer

Personal information
- Born: 2 August 1972 (age 54) Sydney, New South Wales, Australia

Playing information
- Height: 186 cm (6 ft 1 in)
- Weight: 101 kg (15 st 13 lb)
- Position: Wing, Centre
Club
Years	Team	Pld	T	G	FG	P
1991–93	South Sydney	12	0	0	0	0
1994–96	St. George Dragons	32	19	0	0	76
1997	Hunter Mariners	25	9	20	0	76
1998	Cronulla Sharks	11	4	0	0	16
1999	Bradford Bulls	12	2	0	0	8
	Total	92	34	20	0	176

Rugby union career
- Position(s): Wing, Centre
Senior career
Years	Team	Apps	(Points)
1999-01	Rugby Roma	28	(0)
International career
Years	Team	Apps	(Points)
1999-00	Italy	4	(0)

Nicolas Zisti (born 2 August 1972) is an Italian Australian former professional rugby league and rugby union footballer who played in the 1990s and 2000s. He played club level rugby league (RL) for the South Sydney Rabbitohs, the St. George Dragons, the Hunter Mariners, the Cronulla-Sutherland Sharks and the Bradford Bulls, usually as a wing, but also as a centre, and representative level rugby union (RU) for Italy, and at club level for Rugby Roma Olimpic, as a wing or centre.

== Background ==
Nicolas Zisti was born in Sydney, New South Wales, Australia.

== Playing career ==
=== Rugby League ===
Nick Zisti began his professional career playing for the South Sydney Rabbitohs where he made 6 appearances off the bench between 1991 and 1993, scoring no points.

From there he went on to play for the St. George Dragons where he scored 19 tries in 18 games for the Dragons between 1994 and 1996. He scored the Dragons only try in their 1996 20–8 Grand Final defeat by the Manly-Warringah Sea Eagles.

In 1997, he signed for the short-lived Hunter Mariners (with the club only lasting one season in the premiership). He played 16 games, scoring 9 tries and kicking 20 goals. He is the Mariners leading scorer in what was their only season. He set numerous records for the club including most tries, goals, points in a match and most points in a season. Zisti also played in the Hunter Mariners final game, a 36–12 loss against Brisbane in the 1997 World Club Challenge final.

Following the club's demise, he moved to the Cronulla-Sutherland Sharks where he played nine games scoring four tries in the season of 1998. After spending all of his career in Australia he decided to move to England to play in the Super League club the Bradford Bulls.

=== Rugby Union ===
In October 1999 he made his international début for the Italy national rugby union team in a World Cup match against England national rugby union team.

In 1999 he signed a 3-years agreement with Rugby Roma Olimpic, a rugby union team from Rome, Italy. He won the Italian championship in 2000. He won his last international cap for Italy during the 2000 Six Nations vs. France.

In December 2001, because of Rugby Roma's financial problems, he asked to be let free and flew back to Australia.
