= Jason Eade =

Australian rugby league footballer

Personal information
- Full name: Jason Eade
- Born: 15 December 1972 (age 52)

Playing information
- Position: Wing, Centre
Club
Years	Team	Pld	T	G	FG	P
1994	Western Suburbs	12	1	0	0	4
1995–96	Western Reds	24	3	0	0	12
1997	Paris Saint-Germain	9	4	0	0	16
	Total	45	8	0	0	32
- Source: As of 21 December 2022

Jason Eade is an Australian former professional rugby league footballer who played in the 1990s. He played for Western Suburbs and the Western Reds in the NSWRL/ARL competition and for Paris Saint-Germain in the Super League.

== Playing career ==
Eade made his first grade debut in round 3 of the 1994 NSWRL season against Manly-Warringah at Brookvale Oval. Eade played off the bench in a 66–8 loss. Eade joined the newly admitted Western Reds ahead of the 1995 ARL season and was an inaugural squad member at the club. After one further season with the Perth-based club, Eade joined Super League side Paris Saint-Germain. He played a total of nine games for the French club in the 1997 Super League season. After the completion of the season, Paris Saint-Germain were liquidated and Eade never played first grade rugby league again.
