= Macquarie Fields High School =

Location
- Harold Street, Macquarie Fields, South Western Sydney, New South Wales; Australia; 33°59′47″S 150°53′06″E

Information
- Type: Public co-educational comprehensive and selective secondary day school
- Motto: Loyalty, Sincerity, Generosity
- Established: 1981; 45 years ago
- Educational authority: New South Wales Department of Education
- Principal: Karyn O’Brien
- Years: 7–12
- Enrolment: 1,110 (2022)
- Campus type: Suburban
- Colours: Maroon, dark green, white
- Website: macfields-h.schools.nsw.gov.au

Macquarie Fields High School (abbreviated as MFHS) is a government-funded co-educational partially academically selective and comprehensive secondary day school, located in Macquarie Fields, a south-western suburb of Sydney, New South Wales, Australia.

Established in 1981, Macquarie Fields High School caters for approximately 1,000 students from Year 7 to Year 12. The school administered by NSW Education Department and caters for the local community as a comprehensive high school for Grade 7–12 with the first HSC being sat in 1986.

== History ==
The first Principal was Don Harwin and his Deputy was Mike Wilson. Harwin began in 1981 with approximately fourteen staff members and was appointed to Menai High School in 1988 with Mike Wilson as the Deputy Principal.

On 3 June 2026, around 9:30pm, vandals broke into the school, damaging windows, furniture and equipment, causing damage to 27 classrooms totaling $300,000 in damages. On 10 July 2026, a 14-year-old was charged with aggravated break and enter with intention, larceny, and shoplifting value less than or equal to $2000.

== Extracurricular activities ==
=== Future Teacher's Club ===
This initiative allows students to experience first-hand teaching. Students plan and teach lessons to younger grades during 'Teach Week'. Additionally club-members participate with annual visits to University of Sydney, allowing them to partake in insightful discussions and activities with current university students studying secondary education. As tradition, students also have annual excursions to Yanco Agricultural High School, a selective school in Leeton, in south-western New South Wales, giving students rural experiences of schooling. The initiative has been successful as Australia's first Future Teacher's Club; with over 315 club members as of March 2024.

== Campus ==
The hall was refurbished following an arson attack in 2009. In 2009, Macquarie Fields High School was selected as one of thirteen primary and secondary schools around the state to become Centres for Excellence. The school will receive special sponsorship and focus from The Street University, a prestigious university located near the CBD, students selected on the basis of academic excellence and school community involvement will receive a scholarship for their courses.

== Notable alumni ==
- Alyson Annan – Olympic hockey player
- Simon Dwyer – former professional rugby league football player
- Michael De Vere – former professional rugby league footballer
- Brett Emerton – international Australian soccer player
- Shayne McMenemy – former professional rugby league football player
- Prince Mak – former member of Korean idol group, JJCC
- L-FRESH the Lion – Australian hip hop artist

== See also ==
- List of government schools in New South Wales
