= Robbie McCormack =

Australian rugby league footballer

Personal information
- Full name: Robert McCormack
- Born: 14 October 1964 (age 61)

Playing information
- Height: 170 cm (5 ft 7 in)
- Weight: 84 kg (13 st 3 lb)
- Position: Centre, Five-eighth, Hooker
Club
Years	Team	Pld	T	G	FG	P
1988–96	Newcastle Knights	154	17	0	0	68
1997	Hunter Mariners	15	0	0	0	0
1998	Wigan Warriors	24	2	0	0	8
	Total	193	19	0	0	76
Representative
Years	Team	Pld	T	G	FG	P
1992–93	New South Wales	2	0	0	0	0
1992–94	Country NSW	3	0	0	0	0

Robbie McCormack (born 14 October 1964) is an Australian former professional rugby league footballer who played in the 1980s and 1990s. A New South Wales State of Origin representative hooker who started his career as a utility back, he played for Australian clubs the Newcastle Knights and Hunter Mariners, and for English club, Wigan Warriors (with whom he won 1998's Super League III).

== Playing career ==
McCormack began his career with the Newcastle Knights in that club's inaugural 1988 season, when he impressed the critics with his skill at five-eighth. However, in the following 1989 season, McCormack – switched briefly to lock forward – suffered a "sickening" double leg fracture in the sixth game and spent the remainder of the season on the sidelines. In the following two seasons McCormack, played mainly at centre, and, although doubts as to his physical fitness were removed during 1990, he lost form badly during the Knights' disappointing 1991 season and was out of first grade for nine weeks.

However, when tried at for the first time at hooker in 1992 against Manly at Carlaw Park, McCormack impressed immediately for his workrate and his ability to dart out of the dummy half position. McCormack was selected to represent New South Wales in game I of the 1992 State of Origin series and game II of the 1993 series when he replaced Benny Elias as hooker. Eventually becoming captain of the Knights, he was signed by Newcastle's new cross-town rivals the Hunter Mariners for the 1997 Super League (Australia) season. After that McCormack moved to the Super League to play for English club Wigan Warriors. He was named in 1998's Super League Dream Team. He also played at hooker for Wigan Warriors in their 1998 Super League Grand Final victory over Leeds Rhinos.
