= Troy Stone =

Australian rugby league footballer (born 1971)

Personal information
- Born: 13 December 1971 (age 54) Paddington, New South Wales, Australia
- Height: 190 cm (6 ft 3 in)
- Weight: 106 kg (16 st 10 lb)

Playing information
- Position: Prop
Club
Years	Team	Pld	T	G	FG	P
1993	Cronulla Sharks	5	0	0	0	0
1994–96	St. George Dragons	36	2	0	0	8
1997	Hunter Mariners	18	1	0	0	4
1998–01	Canterbury-Bankstown	58	2	0	0	8
2001	Huddersfield	13	1	0	0	4
2002	Widnes Vikings	26	1	0	0	4
	Total	156	7	0	0	28
Representative
Years	Team	Pld	T	G	FG	P
1996	NSW City	1	0	0	0	0
- Source: As of 16 January 2019

Troy Stone (born 13 December 1971) is an Australian rugby league footballer who played as a professional in England and Australia.

== Background ==
Stone was born in Paddington, New South Wales, Australia.

== Playing career ==
A junior from Goulbourn United, Stone debuted in 1993 for the Cronulla Sharks as a centre.

However, in 1994, when Stone moved to join the Dragons he moved into the front row. Stone played in the 1996 Grand Final for St George, which they lost to Manly. Also in 1996, Stone played in his only representative game, playing for NSW City in their annual clash with NSW Country.

Stone then played the 1997 Super League season with the new Hunter Mariners franchise before joining the Canterbury Bulldogs. Stone played from the interchange bench for the Canterbury Bulldogs in their loss at the 1998 NRL grand final to the Brisbane Broncos.

Halfway through the 2001 NRL season, Stone joined the Huddersfield Giants after receiving little game time at Canterbury.

Stone spent a season with the Widnes Vikings before retiring at the end of 2002.
