= Matt Fuller =

Australian rugby league footballer

Personal information
- Full name: Matthew James Fuller
- Born: 31 January 1970 (age 56) Fairfield, New South Wales

Playing information
- Height: 178 cm (5 ft 10 in)
- Weight: 88 kg (13 st 12 lb)
- Position: Hooker, Prop, Second-row, Lock
Club
Years	Team	Pld	T	G	FG	P
1989–91	Canterbury-Bankstown	6	0	0	0	0
1992	St George	3	0	0	0	0
1993	South Sydney	15	0	0	0	0
1993–94	Wakefield Trinity	26	3	0	0	12
1995–97	Western Reds	59	14	0	1	57
1997–98	Wakefield Trinity Wildcats	26	3	0	0	12
1999	Western Suburbs	21	1	0	0	4
	Total	156	21	0	1	85

Matthew "Matt" Fuller (born 31 January 1970) is a former professional rugby league footballer who played in the 1980s and 1990s.

== Playing career ==
Fuller played for the Canterbury-Bankstown Bulldogs, St. George Dragons, South Sydney Rabbitohs, Western Reds, Wakefield Trinity Wildcats (two spells) (captain during second spell), and the Western Suburbs Magpies - making appearances everywhere in the forward pack.

In 1995 he was part of the inaugural Western Reds squad and later served as the club's captain.

On 26 September 1998, Fuller played at lock in Wakefield Trinity’s 24-22 victory over Featherstone Rovers in the 1998 First Division Grand Final at McAlpine Stadium, Huddersfield.

In 1999, Fuller joined Western Suburbs and made 21 appearances for the club as they finished last on the table claiming the wooden spoon. Western Suburbs only managed to win 3 games all year in their final season as a first grade club. Fuller played in Wests final ever game against Auckland at Campbelltown Stadium which ended in a 60-16 defeat. The match would also prove to be Fuller's last game in first grade.

== Post Playing career ==
Following a stint where he captained Wakefield Trinity to a premiership in the United Kingdom, Fuller returned to Western Australia to position himself as one of Perth’s leading health and fitness experts.

Fuller currently owns and manages the Fuller Fitness Training Centre. Self-employed gym owner/operator since 2001, Matt has grown and developed a training facility, where he has mentored over 15,000 personal training sessions.

Fuller's views and opinions are frequently sought from the media in relation to all matters health and fitness. More recently, Fuller has become a permanent fixture on 720 ABC Radio Perth as an expert commentator when the rugby league comes to Perth and is a regular panelist on League Talk with 91.3 SportFM.
