= Damien Chapman =

Australian rugby league footballer

Personal information
- Born: 6 March 1974 (age 51)

Playing information
- Position: Centre, Scrum-half
Club
Years	Team	Pld	T	G	FG	P
1992–95	St. George Dragons	12	2	12	0	32
1996–97	Western Reds	19	2	16	0	40
1998	London Broncos	11	4	13	2	44
	Total	42	8	41	2	116
- Source: RL Project
- Father: John Chapman

Damien Chapman (born 6 March 1974) is an Australian former rugby league footballer who played in the 1990s.

Originally a schoolboy from St. Gregory's Campbelltown, Damien Chapman played for the St. George Dragons and the Western Reds in the ARL premiership and the London Broncos in the Super League. Damien Chapman is the son of former St. George Dragons first grade winger, John Chapman.
