= Matthew Rodwell =

Australian rugby league footballer

Personal information
- Born: 18 November 1971 (age 53); New South Wales, Australia

Playing information
- Height: 178 cm (5 ft 10 in)
- Weight: 82 kg (12 st 13 lb)
- Position: Halfback
Club
Years	Team	Pld	T	G	FG	P
1990–93	Newcastle Knights	44	7	0	2	30
1995–97	Western Reds	57	14	0	0	56
1998	St. George Dragons	25	6	0	0	24
1999	St. George Illawarra	8	0	0	0	0
2000–01	Penrith Panthers	44	9	0	2	38
2002	Warrington Wolves	10	3	0	0	12
	Total	188	39	0	4	160

Matthew Rodwell is a former professional rugby league footballer. He played for the Newcastle Knights, Western Reds, St. George Dragons, St. George Illawarra Dragons, Penrith Panthers and the Warrington Wolves as a halfback.

== Career ==
=== Australia ===
After making his first grade début from the bench for the Knights in 1990 in a 24–4 loss to Balmain at Leichhardt Oval, Rodwell spent almost all of that year and 1991 playing in reserve grade. In 1992, Knights coach David Waite moved Michael Hagan to Five-eighth and brought Rodwell into the first grade side as the halfback. Rodwell had a brilliant rookie season as the Knights reached the Semi-finals for the first time in their 5-year history. For his efforts, Rodwell won the Dally M Rookie of the Year in 1992 as well as the Norwich Rising Star award.

Despite playing 19 games in 1993 (and being featured in the NSWRL's television advertisement featuring Tina Turner and Jimmy Barnes singing Turner's hit song "Simply the Best" with the line "I think rugby league has changed enormously in the past few years"), both Rodwell and the Knights had disappointing seasons finishing in 9th place. Rodwell did not play first grade at all in 1994, and signed with new team, the Perth based Western Reds for 1995. Signing a contract (like most of his Reds teammates) with the rebel Super League in early 1995, Rodwell stayed with the team until the end of the 1997 Super League season.

With Super League and the Australian Rugby League (ARL) calling an end to the Super League war which had torn the game apart to form the National Rugby League (NRL) in 1998, and with the Reds left out of the new competition, Rodwell found himself back in Sydney at the famous St George club. The following year the Dragons merged with the Illawarra Steelers to become the St George Illawarra Dragons, and Rodwell found himself on the outer with team coach David Waite preferring young Steelers half Trent Barrett and he only appeared in 8 games in 1999, missing a place in the Dragons 1999 NRL Grand Final side where in front of a world record rugby league attendance of 107,999 the Dragons lost 20–18 to the Melbourne Storm.

Rodwell was on the move again in 2000, this time to the Penrith Panthers where he would play the final two years of his career in Australia.

=== England ===
Matthew Rodwell signed with the Super League club the Warrington Wolves for 2002's Super League VII, and he retired from playing at the end of 2002, with the Warrington Wolves finishing in 10th place with just 7 wins and 21 losses.

== Post-playing ==
Rodwell was the Chief Executive of the Rugby League Players Association until April 2009, when he left the role to take up an Executive Manager role with the insurance company, GIO. Rodwell is now a General Manager at claims management company EML.

Rodwell was named the Cleo Bachelor of the Year in 1993.
