= Keith Beauchamp (rugby league) =

Australian rugby league footballer

Personal information
- Full name: Keith Beauchamp
- Born: 20 December 1967 (age 58) Australia

Playing information
- Position: Wing
Club
| Years | Team | Pld | T | G | FG | P |
|---|---|---|---|---|---|---|
| 1990–95 | Illawarra | 32 | 7 | 0 | 0 | 28 |
| 1996 | Newcastle Knights | 18 | 9 | 0 | 0 | 36 |
| 1997 | Hunter Mariners | 17 | 7 | 0 | 0 | 28 |
| 1998 | Hull KR |
| | Total | 67 | 23 | 0 | 0 | 92 |
- Source: As of 28 May 2024

Keith Beauchamp (born 20 December 1967) is an Australian former professional rugby league footballer who played in the 1990s.

He played for the Illawarra Steelers from 1990 to 1991 and 1994 to 1995, then the Newcastle Knights in 1996 and finally the Hunter Mariners in 1997. Beauchamp played in the Hunter Mariners final ever game as a club, the 1997 World Club Championship final against Brisbane which they lost 36-12.
