= John Carlaw =

Australian rugby league footballer

Personal information
- Full name: John Carlaw
- Born: 6 February 1975 (age 51) Gosford, New South Wales, Australia

Playing information
- Height: 190 cm (6 ft 3 in)
- Weight: 98 kg (15 st 6 lb; 216 lb)
- Position: Centre, Wing
Club
Years	Team	Pld	T	G	FG	P
1997	Hunter Mariners	13	8	0	0	32
1998	Melbourne Storm	24	6	0	0	24
1999	Balmain Tigers	23	7	0	0	28
2000–01	Wests Tigers	41	14	0	0	56
2002–03	New Zealand Warriors	35	10	0	0	40
2004	St. George Illawarra	15	3	0	0	12
	Total	151	48	0	0	192

John Carlaw (born 6 February 1975) is an Australian former professional rugby league footballer who played in the 1990s and 2000s. A three-quarter back, he played for several Super League and National Rugby League clubs during his career.

== Background ==
Born in Gosford, New South Wales, John Carlaw was a Gosford Townies junior. He was selected to represent NSW Country under-19s in 1994. Signing with the Newcastle Knights, Carlaw was a member of the Knights reserve grade premiership winning team in 1995.

== Playing career ==
He would play for the Newcastle Knights in the 1996 Rugby League World Sevens tournament, but a knee injury suffered during the tournament would keep him out of the 1996 ARL season. Unsigned by the Knights during the Super League war frenzy in April 1995, he was signed by the Hunter Mariners club in the Australian Super League competition of 1997. Carlaw would score eight tries in 13 matches for the Mariners. Following the disbanding of that club upon the creation of the National Rugby League, he joined another new venture team, the Melbourne Storm for their first season.

In 1999, Carlaw moved to the Balmain Tigers for their final year before they merged with Western Suburbs Magpies to form the Wests Tigers club. Carlaw played in Balmain's final ever game as a stand-alone entity which was a 42–14 loss against Canberra.

In 2000, Carlaw played in the Wests Tigers first ever game which was a 24–24 draw against Brisbane.

In 2002, Carlaw moved to the New Zealand Warriors. He played at centre their 2002 NRL Grand Final loss to the Sydney Roosters at the end of the season. He played another season with New Zealand before moving to the St. George Illawarra Dragons for his final year in 2004. He played in his 150th first grade game for the Dragons against his old club, the Warriors, on 14 August 2004.
