= Barrie-Jon Mather =

GB & England dual-code rugby international footballer

Personal information
- Born: Barrie-Jon Mather; 15 January 1973 (age 53) Wigan, England
- Height: 201 cm (6 ft 7 in)
- Weight: 104 kg (16 st 5 lb)

Playing information
- Position: Wing, Centre, Second-row
Club
Years	Team	Pld	T	G	FG	P
1992–95	Wigan	67				105
1995–97	Western Reds	24	5	0	0	20
1998	Castleford Tigers	18	7	0	0	28
2000–02	Castleford Tigers	49	17	0	0	68
	Total	158	29	0	0	221
Representative
Years	Team	Pld	T	G	FG	P
1994–96	Great Britain	3	0	0	0	0
1995	England	3	0	0	0	0

Rugby union career
- Position(s): Outside centre, Winger
Senior career
Years	Team	Apps	(Points)
1998–00	Sale Sharks	35	(45)
2003	Kubota Spears		
- Correct as of 21 July 2008
International career
Years	Team	Apps	(Points)
1999	England	1	(0)
- Correct as of 13 February 2007

Barrie-Jon Mather (born 15 January 1973) is an English former rugby league and rugby union player. A dual-code international player, he was the first Great Britain rugby league player to be capped by England at rugby union.

He was the NSWRL's general manager of football until October 2020, when he was made redundant.

== Early years ==
Mather was born in Ince-in-Makerfield, a suburb of Wigan, Lancashire, on 15 January 1973. He moved to Blackpool at a young age when his father took up a teaching position in Lytham St Annes, and attended Arnold School, where he quickly developed as a rugby union player. In 1991 he was selected in the England Schools rugby union team which lost a Grand Slam against Wales. Other notable players in that side were future World Cup winners Matt Dawson and Richard Hill.

== Club rugby ==
=== Wigan ===
Despite his school boy success, Mather decided that his future lay in rugby league and eventually signed for the Wigan Warriors in 1992. He played at centre in the 2–33 defeat by Castleford in the 1993–94 Regal Trophy Final at Elland Road, Leeds on 22 January 1994. He saw domestic success with Wigan and was a member of the Challenge Cup-winning side of 1994 as well as a member of the side that defeated the Brisbane Broncos in the 1994 World Club Challenge at Brisbane's ANZ Stadium. Relations between the Mather and Wigan turned sour when Mather claimed his contract was null and void because of the circumstances in which it was signed. Mather eventually took Wigan to court when they refused to release his registration without a transfer fee following him signing a contract with Western Reds in Australia. He was unsuccessful in his challenge.

=== Western Reds ===
Mather played a summer stint for the Western Reds in 1995 while at Wigan and fell in love with the Australian way of life. He eventually signed a three-year deal with the club but was unable to complete the move as he claimed to be a free agent but Wigan retained his registration.

Mather was selected for England in the 1995 World Cup Final on the reserve bench but did not play as Australia won the match and retained the Cup.

After two mixed seasons in the ARL and Super League in which he scored 5 tries for the club, the Western Reds suffered financial difficulties and Mather was released.

Mather is the only player to win Great Britain caps whilst at the Western Reds.

=== Castleford Tigers ===
Mather signed for Castleford Tigers in October 1997 following the financial problems of the Western Reds. He stated that Stuart Raper had spoken to him whilst out in Perth for the World Club Challenge match and convinced him Castleford was the club for him. He played for Castleford for just one season before making a big money switch to rugby union.

=== Sale ===
Mather joined Sale Sharks in 1998 on a two-year deal mainly funded by the RFU. It was the beginning of a period of recruitment from rugby league in which the RFU sought to bring some of the best talents to play for England. Mather did not have the best of times with Sale and played for the club until his contract release in 2000. During that time Sale struggled to make an impact in the Premiership, and Mather never lived up to the hype that surrounded his transfer.

=== Back at Castleford ===
Mather returned to Castleford Tigers in 2000 and in his first season back in Super League he made 16 appearances, scoring 7 tries. An injury hit 2001 restricted him to just 8 appearances in which he scored 2 tries following a full shoulder reconstruction. In 2002 Mather made 21 appearances for the Tigers and scored 7 tries for them. However towards the end of the 2002's Super League VII, Mather announced that he would retire from rugby league at the end of the season.

=== Return to union ===
Following his retirement from rugby league, Mather returned to rugby union signing a one-year deal with Coventry in National One. However his season was cut short when he broke his wrist in a game against Orrell and he was released at the end of the year.

=== Japan ===
In 2003 it was announced Mather had signed a 12-month deal to play for Kubota in Japan. Following his time there Mather retired from professional rugby.

== International rugby ==
Mather represented Great Britain between 1994 and 1996 making 3 appearances. He was also selected for England for the 1995 World Cup where he made 3(2?) appearances including playing in the opening game against Australia.

Despite struggling for form with his club Sale, Mather was a surprise call into Clive Woodward's England team to face Wales in a Grand Slam decider on 11 April 1999 at Wembley Stadium. In doing so, he became the first player to represent England at rugby union after having also already played rugby league internationally. England looked to have the game and the Grand Slam won, but a sensational individual effort from Scott Gibbs sent England crashing to a 32–31 defeat and the Five Nations Championship went to Scotland. Mather did not play again for England.

== Coaching and management ==
Following his retirement after a 12 months spell in Japan, Mather was appointed coach of Blackpool RFC in the North Lancs One, following this he became Head Coach at Heaton Moor Rugby. In 2006 Mather was appointed Academy Coach at Guinness Premiership side London Irish.

On 11 June 2009 it was announced Mather would become the RFLs Head of Player Development on 1 July 2009. As part of his role he was also the England team manager. In January 2014 it was announced Mather would become the General Manager, Football of the NSWRL based in Australia, starting in February 2014. He was made redundant from the role in October 2020. On 17 December 2023 it was announced that he would take charge of Fiji following their successful run in the RWC 2023.

In August 2025 Mather was appointed Director of Performance of the New South Wales Waratahs in the Super Rugby, replacing Simon Raiwalui.
