= Rodney Howe =

Australia international rugby league footballer

Personal information
- Born: 31 January 1973 (age 53) Newcastle, New South Wales, Australia

Playing information
- Height: 186 cm (6 ft 1 in)
- Weight: 107 kg (16 st 12 lb)
- Position: Prop
Club
| Years | Team | Pld | T | G | FG | P |
|---|---|---|---|---|---|---|
| 1992–93 | Newcastle Knights | 10 | 1 | 0 | 0 | 4 |
| 1993–94 | Widnes Vikings | 9 | 1 | 0 | 0 | 4 |
| 1995–97 | Western Reds | 40 | 2 | 0 | 0 | 8 |
| 1998–04 | Melbourne Storm | 106 | 4 | 0 | 0 | 16 |
| | Total | 165 | 8 | 0 | 0 | 32 |
Representative
| Years | Team | Pld | T | G | FG | P |
| 1997 | New South Wales (SL) | 1 | 0 | 0 | 0 | 0 |
| 1997 | Australia (SL) | 1 | 0 | 0 | 0 | 0 |
| 1998–01 | New South Wales | 8 | 0 | 0 | 0 | 0 |
| 1998–00 | Australia | 4 | 0 | 0 | 0 | 0 |

Rodney Howe (born 31 January 1973) is an Australian former rugby league footballer who played in the 1990s and 2000s. He played in the forwards for the Newcastle Knights, Western Reds, Melbourne Storm, New South Wales and the Australian national side.

== Early life ==
Born in Newcastle, New South Wales. Howe was educated at St Francis Xavier's College, Hamilton, where he represented 1990 Australian Schoolboys.

== Career ==
In 1998 Howe was banned for 22 matches for using stanozolol.

Howe played at prop forward for Melbourne in their victory in the 1999 NRL Grand Final.

In 2000 Howe was named the Melbourne Storm's player of the year. In 2001, Howe won a special sports edition of the Australian game show The Weakest Link, defeating Kangaroos AFL player David King, winning $46,300 in total winnings and donating it towards the Cancer Council of Victoria. It was, at the time one of the highest ever scores achieved on the show.

Howe was again named the Storm's player of the year in 2002.
