= WA Reds =

Defunct Australian rugby league club, based in Perth, Australia

Western Reds

Club information
- Full name: Western Reds Rugby League Football Club
- Founded: 30 November 1992; 33 years ago
- Exited: 1997; 29 years ago

Former details
- Ground: WACA Ground (1995–1997) Perth Oval (2006–2011)
- Competition: Australian Rugby League (1995–1996); Super League (1997); S.G. Ball Cup (2006–2011); Bundaberg Rum Cup (2009)

The Western Reds were a rugby league football club based in Perth, Western Australia. Founded in 1992 as the Western Reds, they entered into the Australian Rugby League competition in 1995 before defecting to the rival Super League competition in 1997, where they rebranded themselves as the Perth Reds. However, by the end of the year the Reds had become a casualty of the Super League War peace deal and were shut down. The name Reds was named after the native Red Kangaroos. The Reds entered a state of limbo for the next decade but were revived as a lower-level club in 2006 by the WARL and ARL, under the name WA Reds.

Until the Perth Bears commences playing in the NRL in 2027, the Western Reds were the only team from Western Australia to have participated in top-flight rugby league in Australia. A bid to return the club to the NRL was launched in 2012 as the West Coast Pirates, with this bid being taken over by the Western Australian Government, and subsequently merged with the North Sydney Bears to form the Perth Bears.

== History ==
=== Western Reds (1992–1996) ===
The Reds had recruited well in 1993–94, and signed Peter Mulholland as their first coach. St George fullback Michael Potter (twice winner of the Dally M Award), 1992 Rookie of year and CLEO bachelor of the year Matthew Rodwell, and Australian and NSW rep player Brad Mackay were three of the major signings.

Their first game, played at the WACA, was watched by a record 24,392, with the Reds defeating St George 28–16. When News Limited began its "blitzkrieg" in April 1995, the Reds aligned themselves with Super League along with nine other Australian Rugby League clubs. That season the Reds were the best performing of the three expansion teams introduced, winning 11 of their 22 games, including 8 at home, which drew an average crowd of around 13,000, larger than that of many Sydney teams.

The Reds even recruited local identity and decorated WAFL and West Coast Eagles (AFL) player Adrian Barich. Barich, having grown up in Canberra reverted from Australian rules football to rugby league, finishing his career with seasons with the Reds, however he never played in first grade.

After declaring that the club may not have the financial resources to compete in the 1996 ARL Optus Cup, a major sponsorship with the Rupert Murdoch-owned Sunday Times gave the club some much needed money. By mid 1996 club support had dwindled to just over 6,000.

=== Perth Reds (1997) ===
In 1997, the Reds became one of eight ARL teams to join the rival Super League during the dispute known as the Super League war. They changed their name to the Perth Reds for the 1997 Super League season, and adopted a jersey of red, white and black. Although the club had made some promising signings, such as Rodney Howe and Robbie Kearns, the crushing $10 million debt that hung over the club (from having to pay the airfares for all visiting teams) at the end of the season led to Super League axing the Perth Reds on 1 October 1997.

=== Hiatus (1998–2005) ===
Rugby league has continued to be played in Western Australia since the Reds left the top-flight competition with the Swan Brewery Cup continuing and NRL matches being staged at various times since 1998. On 8 May 1999, Melbourne Storm played Western Suburbs Magpies at Lathlain Park in Perth, with Melbourne running out winners 62–6. In 2005, Cronulla took their home game against the New Zealand Warriors to Perth Oval, and played in front of around 13,000 spectators.

=== WA Reds (2006–2011) ===
The WARL resurrected the Reds in 2006 with the intent of joining the National Rugby League in the future. In 2008 the Reds joined the Jim Beam Cup and played out of Perth Oval.

In the 2009 Bundaberg Red Cup the Reds were winless until they won 3 of their 4 last games, giving them something to build on for the next season. Darwin Rugby League product Aaron Barnes was named the Reds' player of the year.
Unfortunately for financial reasons, the Reds senior team was withdrawn from the Bundy Cup for 2010.

In 2010, the WA Reds entered an Under 18's team in the S. G. Ball Cup competition. The first trial game on 30 January 2010 was against the runners-up of the Western Australia Rugby League competition the Central Bulldogs, which they won 38–20. The WARL set up two junior academies to help develop players for a return to the NRL with the SG Ball side providing a staging ground for player development. The WA Reds juniors won their first SG Ball game beating the Balmain Tigers at ME Stadium 28–8.

Whilst the team found it tough going against often bigger and more experienced sides, they did claim a couple of scalps, and at the end of the season Curtis Rona was signed by the Sydney Roosters, earning a call up to their under-20s side during 2010.

A new bid logo was launched in 2010 and membership for fans was made available. NRL CEO David Gallop recognised the WA Reds 2013 bid on a number of occasions, speaking positively about the potential for a Perth team in the NRL, but no Perth team eventuated until 2027.

== Players ==
1995 U/21 Reds
(New Zealand) Jade Koteka
(Australia) David Hignett
(Australia) Loa Tupou
(Australia) Paul Muller
(Australia) Darren Mullholland
(New Zealand) Duncan Arkley
(Australia) Will Bramwell
(Australia) Ward Denman
(Australia) Matt Geyer
(Australia) Andrew Lippiat
(Australia) Chris Scarisbrick
(New Zealand) Leon Ruri
(Australia) Aaron Ritchie
(New Zealand) Nick Twiddle
(Australia) David Huber
(Australia) Shaun Owen
(Australia) Brock McDonald
(Australia) Myles Ritchie
(Australia) Wayne Blazey
(Australia) Brett Hyland
(Australia) Brian McCarthey
(Australia) Graeme Shield
(Australia) Jarred Millar
(Australia) Chris Lott
(Australia) Jason Edmunds (Captain)
(New Zealand) Tony Hemana
(Australia) Byron Hutton
(Australia) Ryan Gundry
(Australia) Adam Beard
(Australia) Dwayne Evans
(Australia) Daniel Cross
(Australia) Michael Jackson
(Australia) Dane Dorahy
(Australia) Ryan Dissegna
(Australia) Sean Edmunds

1st Grade
(Australia) Mark Anderson
(Australia) Simon Kricheldorff
(Australia) Mark Geyer
(Australia) Matt Geyer
(Australia) Rodney Howe
(Australia) Robbie Kearns
(Australia) Brad Mackay
(England) Barrie-Jon Mather
(Australia) Jason Eade
(Australia) Simon Robbie
(Australia) Scott Wilson
(Australia) David Dowell
(Republic of Ireland) Shayne McMenemy
(Wales) Danny Davies

=== WA Reds (2006–2011) ===
(Australia) Liam Mulhall
(New Zealand) Savi Hafoka
(New Zealand) Pikari Te Wara
(Australia) Clae Morgan
(Australia) Heath Egglestone
(Australia) Ryan Dickson
(Australia) Matt Doeg
(New Zealand) James Blake
(New Zealand) Issac Thomas
(Australia) John Phipps
(Australia) James McGowan
(New Zealand) Delane Edwards
(New Zealand) Taurean Sheehan
(New Zealand) Joel Freeman
(Scotland) Gareth Morton
(Australia) Aaron Barnes
(Australia) Nathan Searle
(New Zealand) Carlin Miller
(Australia) Michael Elphick
(Australia) Ben McCrone
(Australia) Frank Matthewman
(Australia) George Ghazal

=== Internationals ===
(Australia) Rodney Howe (1997)
(Australia) Julian O'Neill (1997)
(England) Barrie-Jon Mather (1997)
(Republic of Ireland) Shayne McMenemy (2007)
(South Africa) Halvor Harris (2015)
(South Africa) Trent Swords (2015)
(South Africa) Bradley Williams (2015)

=== Coaches ===
- John Dorahy (U/21 1995)
- Peter Mulholland (1995–96)
- Dean Lance (1997)

== Club records ==
Biggest Win

- 28 points, 34–6 against Canterbury Bulldogs at Perth Oval on 23 March 1997.

Biggest Loss

- 42 points, 0–42 against Sydney Bulldogs at Parramatta Stadium on 9 April 1995.

Most Consecutive Wins

- 2 matches, 1–8 July 1995
- 2 matches, 21–28 July 1995
- 2 matches, 12–18 August 1995
- 2 matches, 14–20 July 1996
- 2 matches, 23–27 March 1997

Most Consecutive Loses

- 9 matches, 13 April – 23 June 1996

Most First Grade Matches

- 59 – Matthew "Matt" Fuller (1995–97)

Most First Grade Points

- 210 – Chris Ryan (21 tries, 63 goals)

Most First Grade Tries

- 21 – Chris Ryan

Most Points in a Season

- 136 – Chris Ryan (9 tries, 50 goals)

Most Tries in a Season

- 10 – Matthew "Matt" Fuller (1995)

Most Points in a Match

- 26 – Julian O'Neill (4 tries, 5 goals. v Canterbury, 1997)

Most Tries in a Match

- 4 – Julian O'Neill (v Canterbury, 1997)

Most Goals in a Match

- 6 – Julian O'Neill (v Auckland, 1996)
- 6 – Damien Chapman (v Penrith, 1997)

== See also ==
- West Coast Pirates
- National Rugby League
- Western Australia Rugby League
- Rugby league in Western Australia
