= Rugby league in Western Australia =

- Governing body: Western Australia Rugby League
- First played: 1948, Perth, Western Australia
- Registered players: 5,443; 30,000+ (including variants)
- Clubs: 31

Audience records
- Single match: 59,721 (2019 State of Origin series. Optus Stadium, Perth, Western Australia)

In Western Australia, rugby league is played at amateur level by 31 clubs across 5 regional leagues with a total of around 7,900 players. It attracts an audience mainly for the State of Origin series.

The state will have a professional club in a national competition from 2027 with the entry of the Perth Bears: Western Australia was previously represented by the Western Reds/Perth Reds in 1995–1997, but the Reds were shut down at the end of 1997 in the aftermath of the Super League war.

== History ==
The Western Australia Rugby League was formed in 1948 with Fremantle, Perth, South Perth and Cottesloe as the foundation clubs. In 1950 the Australian Rugby League Board of Control sent ex Kangaroos hooker Arthur Folwell to Western Australia to try to promote the game.

Although touring Great Britain and French rugby league teams had played tour matches in Perth, it was not until the late 1980s that the New South Wales Rugby League (NSWRL) played games there.

=== New South Wales Rugby League matches ===
In August 1989, the NSWRL played the first game outside New South Wales or Queensland, with a crowd of 21,992 watching Canberra play Canterbury at the WACA.

Subsequent fixtures between 1990 and 1993 were equally well supported, and the League realised that a Perth team could be successful. Perth's application for the Winfield Cup was accepted on 30 November 1992, along with the South Queensland Crushers, the North Queensland Cowboys and the Auckland Warriors. The early tip for the nickname of the Perth side was Pumas, but the red kangaroo, Western Australia's best-known native animal, was chosen and the team became known as the Western Reds, with the colours of Red, Black, Yellow and White.

=== Western Reds and Super League War ===
Western Australia's first rugby league team to play in a national competition were the Western Reds, who played in the 1995 and 1996 seasons of the Australian Rugby League. In 1997 they changed their name to the Perth Reds and joined the Super League as inaugural members.

Despite showing some promise (particularly in the underage competitions) the Reds were not invited to join the National Rugby League in 1998 as part of the agreement to end the Super League war.

In 2007 NRL WA re-formed the team as the WA Reds to compete in the Jim Beam Cup from 2008, with a view to entering the National Rugby League competition in 2012. Their home ground is Perth Oval.

=== NRL and State of Origin series in Perth ===
On 14 February 2009 Perth Oval played host to the first NRL pre-season match for the year between St George-Illawarra Dragons and Sydney Roosters. The match was a one sided affair but a great stepping stone for WA Rugby League with just under 10,000 supporters in attendance.

On Saturday 13 June 2009 at Members Equity Stadium in Perth, the South Sydney Rabbitohs and Melbourne Storm played in front of a crowd of 15,197. The Melbourne Storm won 28–22. The Rabbitohs again hosted one of their home games in Perth in 2010 against the Melbourne Storm. In 2011, the Rabbitohs played the Brisbane Broncos on a Friday night, a rarity in such a foreign territory for the NRL.

=== West Coast Pirates (2012–2020) ===
In 2012, the WARL launched the West Coast Pirates as the Perth bid team for an NRL licence. West Coast competed in the SG Ball Cup instead of the WA Reds. This bid collapsed due to COVID-19 pandemic and the emergence of a new bid from West Australian backed Cash Converters and the North Sydney Bears to form the Perth Bears.

The National Rugby League played a double-header at Perth Stadium in round 1 of the 2018 NRL season in front of 38,842 fans.

In recent years State of Origin series matches between Queensland and New South Wales have been showcased in Perth in an effort to grow the code's audience, attracting fans from across the country. The second match of the 2019 State of Origin series between New South Wales and Queensland was played at Perth Stadium on 23 June 2019 and marked the first Origin game to be played in Western Australia. New South Wales defeated Queensland 38–6 in front of a record crowd for the code in the state of 59,721 spectators. The second match of the 2022 State of Origin series was also played in Perth, attracting an attendance of 59,358.

=== Perth Bears NRL bid (2024) ===
In August 2024, the North Sydney Bears and a Western Australian consortium headed by Cash Converters founders the Cumins family, signed off on an agreement to lodge an application for the Perth Bears to enter a team in the 2027 NRL season. The logo will be red, white and black with yellow as a nod to the Western Reds.

On 9 October 2024, the bid was formally rejected by ARL Commission Chairman Peter V'landys, although there remained an option for a Western Australian-based team to enter the league, independent of the bid consortium.

On 24 April 2025, the NRL agreed to a $50 million deal with the Western Australian Government, thereby securing the return of the Bears to the competition after 28 years, along with the return of a Perth team to top-flight rugby league after 30 years.

The team was officially announced as the Perth Bears on 9 May 2025.

== Governing body ==
NRL Western Australia is responsible for administering the game of rugby league in Western Australia. Western Australia is an Affiliated State of the overall Australian governing body the Australian Rugby League.

== Participation ==
Category	2021/22	2023/24
Adult Male		4,441
Adult Female		1,002
Total	7,900	5,443

== WARL/NRLWA competitions ==
=== WARL/NRLWA Premiership ===
The NRLWA, sponsored as the Fuel to Go and Play Premiership, is the premier rugby league football competition in the state. The majority of the Eleven clubs originate in the Perth metro area and both Fremantle and South Perth are foundation WARL clubs. Junior grades run from under 6's up to under 16's and senior competition is divided into four divisions, Men's First Grade, Men's Reserve Grade (Val Murphy Trophy), Women's Tackle and Women's League Tag (Flag Belt).

Colours	Club	District	Ground	Founded	Junior Association
	Fremantle Roosters*	Fremantle	Treeby Sports Complex	1948	Southern Pride
	South Perth Lions*	South Perth	George Burnett Park	1948	Southern Pride
	Kalamunda Bulldogs	Belmont	Hartfield Park	1949	Northern Fusion
	North Beach Sea Eagles*	North Beach	Charles Riley Reserve	1951	Northern Fusion
	Willagee Bears	Willagee	Webber Reserve	1962	Southern Pride
	Rockingham Coastal Sharks*	Rockingham	Lark Hill Sports Complex	1988	South West Dolphins
	Joondalup Giants*	Joondalup	Admiral Reserve	1990	Northern Fusion
	Mandurah Storm	Mandurah	Ocean road reserve	2013	South West Dolphins
	Ellenbrook Rabbitohs*	Ellenbrook	Charlottes Vinyard Pavilion	2015	Northern Fusion
	Kwinana Titans	Kwinana	Thomas Oval	2022	South West Dolphins
	Alkimos Tigers	Eglinton	Amberton Playing Fields	2015	Northern Fusion
	Busselton Broncos	Busselton	Busselton Sportsmans Club	2017	South West Dolphins
	Bunbury Titans	Bunbury	Hay Park Sports Complex	2017	South West Dolphins
	Dalyellup Rhinos	Dalleyup	East Dalyellup Pavilion	2017	South West Dolphins
	Eaton Panthers	Eaton		2017	South West Dolphins
	Albany Sea Dragons	Albany		2019	South West Dolphins
	Serpentine-Jarrahdale Serpents	Serpentine		2023	South West Dolphins
	Australind Cowboys	Australind			

* Denotes currently fielding a First Grade Team in the Fuel to Go and Play Premiership

== Regional Competitions ==
=== East Pilbara Rugby League ===
- Newman Crushers RLC
- Paraburdoo Pirates Touch & Rugby League Football Club
- Pannawonica Panthers
- Tom Price Steelers Rugby League Club

=== Goldfields Rugby League ===
- Goldfields Titans (Kalgoorlie)

=== Kimberley Rugby League ===
- Kununurra Thunder
- Ord River Bulls

=== Pilbara Rugby League ===
The Pilbara Rugby League is a seven club competition in the north-west of Western Australia. The clubs are:

- Broome Jets
- Karratha Broncos
- Karratha Roosters
- Karratha Storm
- Port Hedland Hawks
- South Hedland Cougars

== State Representative Team ==
The WARL also forms a state team to compete in the Affiliated States Championship each year. Western Australia is considered to have the strongest state team of the three non-rugby league states in mainland Australia and have won most of the Affiliated States Championships.

== Players ==
- Adrian Barich (North Beach Sea Eagles)
- Waqa Blake (Joondalup Giants, Western Pirates)
- Kennedy Cherrington (Rockingham Sharks)
- Kurt De Luis (South Perth Lions)
- Bryson Goodwin (Canning Bulldogs, South Perth Lions)
- Jon Green (South Perth Lions)
- Daniel Holdsworth (North Beach Sea Eagles)
- Royce Hunt (Willagee Bears and Goldfields Titans)
- Shanice Parker (Willagee Bears)
- Cory Paterson (South Perth Lions)
- Chance Peni (Willagee Bears)
- Matthew Petersen (Belmont Steelers)
- Jordan Pereira (Willagee Bears)
- Curtis Rona (Joondalup Giants, Western Force Academy)
- Josh Rogers (North Beach Sea Eagles)
- Anneka Stephens (Joondalup Giants)
- Lee Te Maari (Joondalup Giants)

== See also ==
- Sport in Western Australia
- Rugby league in Australia
