= Aranmore Catholic College =

School in Western Australia

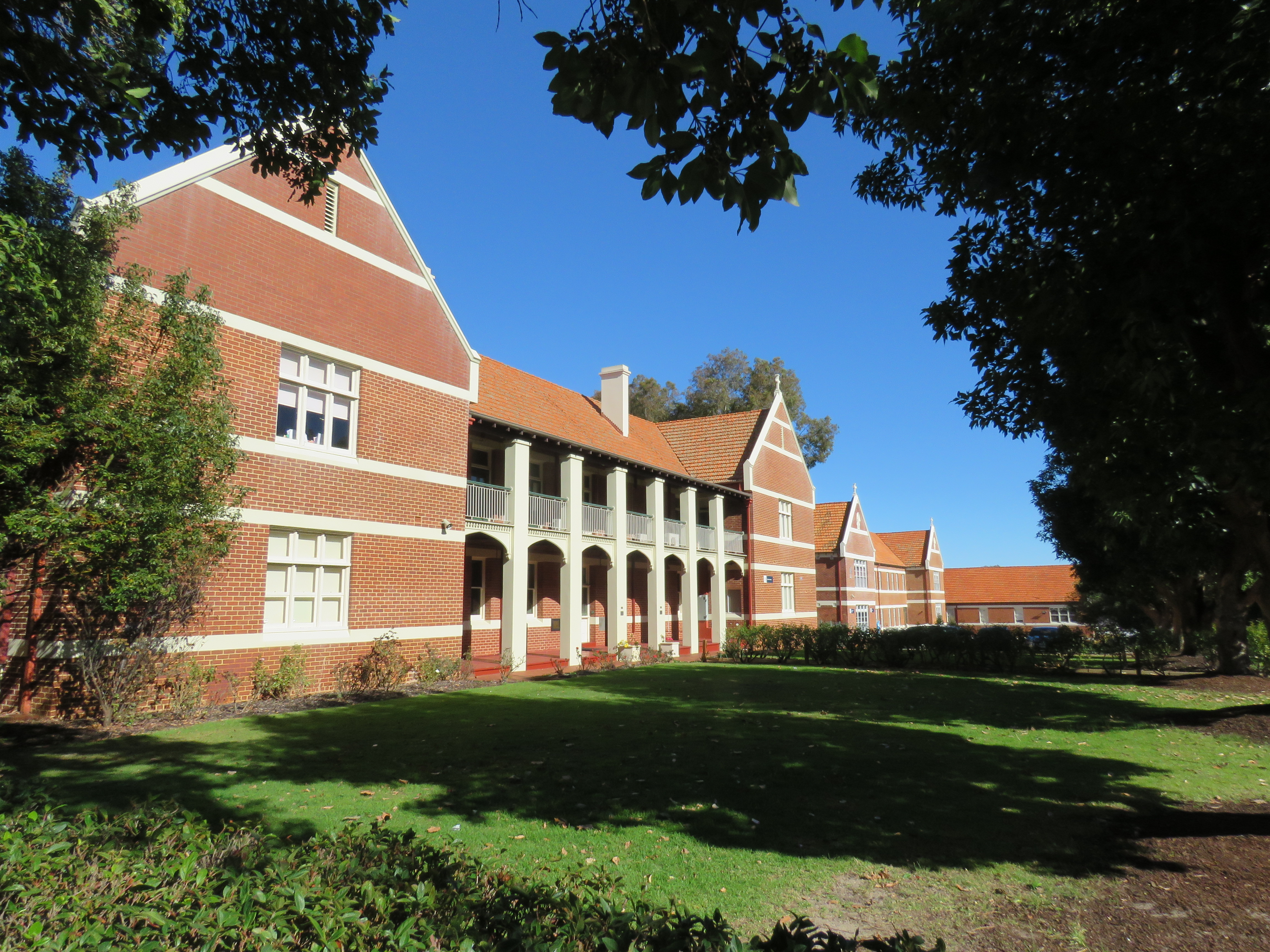
- Aranmore Catholic College in July 2023

Location
- Leederville, Western Australia; Australia; 31°55′40″S 115°50′35″E

Information
- Former name: St Mary’s Girls School; Christian Brothers' College Leederville
- Type: Independent co-educational secondary day school
- Motto: Trust
- Religious affiliation: Sisters of Mercy
- Denomination: Roman Catholicism
- Established: 1903; 123 years ago
- Principal: Lisa Fogliani
- Grades: Pre-K to Year 12
- Enrolment: c. 700 (2018)
- Colours: Red, blue and white
- Website: www.aranmore.wa.edu.au

Western Australia Heritage Register
- Designated: 3 June 2005
- Reference no.: 8709

Aranmore Catholic College is a co-educational school for pre-kindergarten to Year 12, located in Leederville in Perth, Western Australia.

== History ==
The school was established as Our Lady of Perpetual Succour School, Aranmore in 1903 by two Sisters of Mercy: Mother Berchmans and Mother Aquin. In the 1930s, the school was renamed St Mary's College.

In 1986, St Mary's and the adjacent Christian Brothers College amalgamated as Aranmore Catholic College. In 2026, Aranmore Catholic Primary School was amalgamated into the school.

== Demographics ==
Enrollments are sourced from the local metropolitan area, regional WA, and internationally.

== Notable alumni ==
- Michael Malone – iiNet founder and CEO
- Ryan Campbell – Western Warriors cricket player
- Ian Goodenough - Politician, Federal Member for Moore (2013–2025)
- Bryson Goodwin – NRL Bulldogs/Rabbitohs
- Bronx Goodwin – NRL Raiders/Sharks
- Tom Hogan – Test cricketer
- Daniel Holdsworth – NRL Dragons/Bulldogs
- Kane Koteka – Western Force rugby union player
- Thon Maker – Milwaukee Bucks NBA basketball player (2010)
- Tony Simpson – WA MLA
- Corey Paterson – NRL Knights/Tiger
- Chance Peni – Melbourne Rebels rugby union player
- Curtis Rona – Canterbury-Bankstown Bulldogs rugby league player, Western Force rugby player, Australian Wallaby test match rugby player
- Lee Te Maari – NRL Bulldogs
- Mike Veletta – Test cricketer
- Mike Willesee AO – Australian television presenter
- Mark Zanotti – Subiaco Lions, West Coast Eagles, Brisbane Bears and Fitzroy footballer
- Tamaiti Williams- New Zealand professional rugby player for the All Blacks.

== See also ==
- Catholic education in Australia
- Education in Western Australia
- List of schools in the Perth metropolitan area
