= NRL Western Australia =

Rugby league in the state of Western Australia

- Founded: 1948
- Formerly named: Western Australian Amateur Rugby League
- Responsibility: Western Australia
- Headquarters: Perth Rectangular Stadium
- Key people: André De Jager (Chair); John Sackson (Chief Executive)
- Website: nrlwa.com.au

(Western Australia)

NRL Western Australia (abbreviated as NRL WA, and formerly the Western Australian Rugby League) is responsible for administering the game of rugby league football in the state of Western Australia.

The NRLWA administers all forms of the game in Western Australia and runs the main Perth metropolitan competitions. This includes eleven clubs in the Perth metropolitan competition (seven fielding first grade), sponsored as the Fuel to Go and Play Premiership, as well as representative teams that compete in interstate competitions.
There are over 4,000 participants

== History ==
Formed in April 1948 as the Western Australian Amateur Rugby Football League, foundation clubs were Cottesloe, Fremantle, Perth and South Perth.

The first interstate match played by Western Australians was against the South Australia in 1948, with WA winning the series 2–0.

In 1969 Darwin City invited the WARL to Darwin to play a match in celebration of Darwin's 100th founding anniversary in which WA won 23–19. In 1976 WA was invited to participate in the nationwide Amco Cup, where they defeated the Northern Territory 23–18.

On 2 October 1982 to begin the 1982 Kangaroo tour of Great Britain and France, Western Australia played the Wally Lewis captained Australian Kangaroos in a match at the Cannington Raceway in Perth (on the same day the Australian test team played their first ever test match against Papua New Guinea in Port Moresby). Predictably the Kangaroos defeated WA 57–5, running in 13 tries to 1 with Parramatta Eels winger Eric Grothe, Sr. crossing for 4 tries. The Australian team that day included players who would go on to be mainstays in the Australian test team over the next 5–10 years including Lewis, Grothe, Gene Miles, Steve Mortimer, Greg Conescu and Wayne Pearce as well as test veterans Rod Morris and Les Boyd.

NT toured again in 1981, 1983 & 1985 and since 2001 Western Australia has competed annually in the Affiliated States Championship, winning the most titles of any state or territory.

=== International touring teams in WA ===
International football also has a history in WA, with Great Britain Lions touring Perth in 1950, 1957 1962 1975 England 1958, and France touring in 1951, 1955, 1964, 1990.

== Club football ==
Branding of the Western Australian Rugby League

Former logo

The first tour game by an interstate club was in 1949 when Balmain Tigers of the NSWRL traveled to Perth. The first tour match by a club affiliated with the Queensland Rugby League was in 1985 when the Qld Country side played a match against the WA State Team. Further interstate club matches occurred in (see list above)

Following the demise of the Western Reds in 1997, there was no professional rugby league team in Western Australia.

The first match in Perth after the Reds were shut down occurred in 1999 when the Western Suburbs Magpies hosted the Melbourne Storm in an NRL premiership match. Further premiership matches followed in 2005 when Cronulla Sharks hosted the New Zealand Warriors, and in July 2013 when the South Sydney Rabbitohs hosted the New Zealand Warriors at NIB Stadium.

Trial matches have also been played, with South Sydney Rabbitohs hosting Canterbury Bulldogs in the 2005 pre-season.

On 24 April 2025, the NRL agreed to a $50 million deal with the Western Australian Government, thereby securing the entry of the Perth Bears in 2027: with this, a Western Australian team will return to top-flight rugby league after 30 years.

== National competition ==
The staging of New South Wales Rugby League premiership matches in the late 1980s and early 1990s led to a push for a Perth-based entry into the Australian Rugby League competition. In 1992, the Western Reds club was accepted into the national competition and would play its first season in 1995; the Reds would play in 1996 and in the Australian Super League in 1997 under the Perth Reds moniker.

A total of $10m in debt, along with issues surrounding the Super League war and the formation of the National Rugby League, led to the Reds being shut down at the end of the 1997 season.

On 12 December 2006, the Australian Rugby League board accepted a proposal to establish a Western Australian Rugby League representative side to play in the NSWRL Jim Beam Cup for 2008 and 2009, known as the WA Reds, and playing home matches at Perth Oval.

In season 2010 the decision was made to enter the WA Reds team into the SG Ball Cup Under 18 competition. The season was a tough one, with the 'Reds' finishing second last, winning only their opening game of the season. The 2011 season saw the young Reds side improve their credentials finishing 13th with three wins from nine matches for the season.

On 27 June 2012, the Western Australian Rugby League announced a new identity for its NRL entry bid. The West Coast Pirates was released as the team name, with the logo a pirate skull over crossed cutlasses. The announcement of this new bid identity is viewed as a longer-term strategy for a Western Australian-based National Rugby League team, but the NRL officially stated that there would be no further expansion until 2017 to shore up its financially weak structure.

Multiple attempts to resurrect a Perth-based team stalled over the years, and an original bid was rejected by the NRL in October 2024. However, in April 2025, after initially putting negotiations on hold, the NRL entered negotiations with the Government of Western Australia, and on 24 April 2025, an agreement was reached to admit the Bears into the competition in 2027 as a Perth Bears expansion team, the first Perth-based top-flight rugby league team in 30 years.

== WARL competitions ==
=== First Grade clubs ===
Club Name	Club Nickname	Colours	City/Suburb	Home venue	Est.	FG Seasons	FG Premierships	
Club Name	Club Nickname	Colours	City/Suburb	Home venue	Est.	FG Seasons	Total	Recent
Ellenbrook	Rabbitohs		Perth (Ellenbrook)	Charlottes Vinyard Pavilion	2015	2019, 2026–present	0	—
Fremantle	Roosters		Perth (Fremantle)	Treeby Sports Complex	1948	1948–present	12	2022
Joondalup	Giants		Perth (Joondalup)	Admiral Reserve	1990	1990–present	2	2020
Kalamunda	Bulldogs		Perth (Forrestfield)	Hartfield Park		2026-present		
Kwinana	Titans		Perth (Kwinana)	Thomas Oval		2026-present	0	-
North Beach	Sea Eagles		Perth (North Beach)	Charles Riley Reserve	1951	1959-present	15	2024
Rockingham	Coastal Sharks		Perth (Rockingham)	Lark Hill Sports Complex				
South Perth	Lions		Perth (South Perth)	George Burnett Park	1948	1948–present	20	2014
Willagee	Bears		Perth (Willagee)	Webber Reserve			1	2025

=== WARL Premiership ===
The NRLWA, sponsored as the Fuel to Go and Play Premiership, is the premier rugby league football competition in the state. The majority of the Eleven clubs originate in the Perth metro area and both Fremantle and South Perth are foundation WARL clubs. Junior grades run from under 6's up to under 16's and senior competition is divided into four divisions, Men's First Grade, Men's Reserve Grade (Val Murphy Trophy), Women's Tackle and Women's League Tag (Flag Belt).

Colours	Club	Nickname	District	Ground	Founded	Junior Association
First Grade*
	Fremantle*	Roosters*	Fremantle	Treeby Sports Complex	1948	Southern Pride
	Joondalup*	Giants*	Joondalup	Admiral Reserve	1990	Northern Fusion
	North Beach*	Sea Eagles*	North Beach	Charles Riley Reserve	1951	Northern Fusion
	Rockingham*	Coastal Sharks*	Rockingham	Lark Hill Sports Complex	1988	South West Dolphins
	South Perth*	Lions*	South Perth	George Burnett Park	1948	Southern Pride
	Willagee	Bears	Willagee	Webber Reserve	1962	Southern Pride
Second Grade*
	Alkimos	Tigers	Eglinton	Amberton Playing Fields	2015	Northern Fusion
	Ellenbrook*	Rabbitohs*	Ellenbrook	Charlottes Vinyard Pavilion	2015	Northern Fusion
	Kalamunda	Bulldogs	Belmont	Hartfield Park	1949	Northern Fusion
Third Grade
	Kwinana	Titans	Kwinana	Thomas Oval	2022	South West Dolphins
	Mandurah	Storm	Mandurah	Ocean Road Reserve	2013	South West Dolphins
	Serpentine-Jarrahdale	Serpents	Serpentine	Lark Hill Sportsplex	2023	South West Dolphins
Junior Grade
	Busselton	Broncos	Busselton	Busselton Sportsmans Club	2017	South West Dolphins
	Bunbury	Titans	Bunbury	Hay Park Sports Complex	2017	South West Dolphins
	Dalyellup	Rhinos	Dalyellup	East Dalyellup Pavilion	2017	South West Dolphins
	Eaton	Panthers	Eaton	Eaton	2017	South West Dolphins
	Albany	Sea Dragons	Albany	Albany	2019	South West Dolphins

* Denotes currently fielding a First Grade Team in the Fuel to Go and Play Premiership * Denotes First Grade contests for the Fuel to Go and Play Premiership * Denotes Second Grade contests for the Val Murphy Trophy

=== First Grade premiers ===
Year	Club	Titles
1948	South Perth Lions	1
1949	Perth†	1
1950	Fremantle Roosters	1
1951	Perth†	2
1952	South Perth Lions	2
1953	South Perth Lions	3
1954	South Perth Lions	4
1955	Cottesloe Tigers†	1
1956	Victoria Park Butchers	1
1957	South Perth Lions	5
1958	South Perth Lions	6
1959	Victoria Park Butchers	2
1960	Victoria Park Butchers	3
1961	Fremantle Roosters	2
1962	Victoria Park Butchers	4
1963	Fremantle Roosters	3
1964	Applecross Jets†	1
1965	Applecross Jets†	2
1966	Applecross Jets†	3
1967	Applecross Jets†	4
1968	Victoria Park Butchers	5
1969	Applecross Jets†	5
1970	Applecross Jets†	6
1971	North Beach Sea Eagles	1
1972	Applecross Jets†	7
1973	South Perth Lions	7
1974	North Beach Sea Eagles	2
1975	South Perth Lions	8
1976	Fremantle Roosters	4
1977	Fremantle Roosters	5
1978	Canning Bulldogs	1
1979	Mosman-Cottesloe Tigers†	2
1980	North Beach Sea Eagles	3
1981	Fremantle/Mosman-Cottesloe†	6/3
1982	South Perth Lions	9
1983	South Perth Lions	10
1984	North Beach Sea Eagles	4
1985	South Perth Lions	11
1986	Applecross Jets†	8
1987	Belmont Steelers†	1
1988	Belmont Steelers†	2
1989	Belmont Steelers†	3
1990	Canning Bulldogs	2
1991	Canning Bulldogs	3
1992	Applecross Jets†	9
1993	Rockingham Raiders	1
1994	Canning Bulldogs	4
1995	Belmont Steelers†	4
1996	South Perth Lions	12
1997	Fremantle Roosters	7
1998	North Beach Sea Eagles	5
1999	Canning Bulldogs	5
2000	Joondalup Giants	1
2001	North Beach Sea Eagles	6
2002	South Perth Lions	13
2003	North Beach Sea Eagles	7
2004	South Perth Lions	14
2005	South Perth Lions	15
2006	North Beach Sea Eagles	8
2007	North Beach Sea Eagles	9
2008	South Perth Lions	16
2009	South Perth Lions	17
2010	South Perth Lions	18
2011	South Perth Lions	19
2012	North Beach Sea Eagles	10
2013	North Beach Sea Eagles	11
2014	South Perth Lions	20
2015	Fremantle Roosters	8
2016	North Beach Sea Eagles	12
2017	Fremantle Roosters	9
2018	Fremantle Roosters	10
2019	Fremantle Roosters	11
2020	Joondalup Giants	2
2021	North Beach Sea Eagles	13
2022	Fremantle Roosters	12
2023	North Beach Sea Eagles	14
2024	North Beach Sea Eagles	15
2025	Willagee Bears	1
2026	South Perth Lions	21

† Denotes club dissolved and no longer exists

== Regional competitions ==
=== East Pilbara rugby league ===
- Tom Price Steelers Rugby League Club
- Paraburdoo Pirates Touch & Rugby League Football Club
- Pannawonica Panthers

=== Goldfields rugby league ===
- Goldfields Titans (Kalgoorlie)

=== Kimberley rugby league ===
- Kununurra Thunder
- Ord River Bulls

=== Pilbara rugby league ===
The Pilbara Rugby League was a 6 team competition in the north-west of Western Australia. Wickham Wasps were back to back premiers in 2016/17 before the PRL folded. Some games are still completed to keep rugby league in the region alive. The clubs are:

- Wickham Wasps
- Karratha Broncos
- Karratha Roosters
- Karratha Storm
- Port Hedland Hawks
- South Hedland Cougars

== Notable WARL juniors ==
The following is a list of former WARL juniors who later competed in the NRL or NRLW:

Name	Junior team	NRL/NRLW team	Career	Ref
Russell Addison	Fremantle Roosters	South Sydney Rabbitohs	1960–1961	
Brian Wedgewood	Fremantle Roosters	Canterbury Bulldogs	1967–1970	
Jon Grieve	South Perth Lions	Manly Warringah Sea Eagles, Western Reds	1991–1997	
Jon Green	South Perth Lions	Canterbury Bulldogs, St. George Illawarra Dragons, Cronulla Sharks	2006–2013	
Bryson Goodwin	South Perth Lions	Cronulla Sharks, Canterbury Bulldogs, South Sydney Rabbitohs	2007–2020	
Bronx Goodwin	South Perth Lions	Canberra Raiders, Cronulla Sharks, St. George Illawarra Dragons	2007–2012	
Cory Paterson	South Perth Lions	Newcastle Knights, North Queensland Cowboys, Wests Tigers	2007–2014	
Rueben Cherrington	South Perth Lions, Rockingham Coastal Sharks	Parramatta Eels	2022–	
Kurt De Luis	South Perth Lions	Manly Sea Eagles	2021–2022	
Luke Goodwin	Canning Bulldogs	Canterbury Bulldogs, Penrith Panthers, Western Reds, Western Suburbs Magpies	1992–1999	
Jarrad Millar	North Beach Sea Eagles	Western Reds	1997	
Daniel Holdsworth	North Beach Sea Eagles	Cronulla Sharks, St. George Illawarra Dragons, Canterbury Bulldogs	2004–2014	
Josh Rogers	North Beach Sea Eagles	Brisbane Broncos	2023–	
Matt Petersen	Belmont Steelers	Parramatta Eels, North Queensland Cowboys, Gold Coast Titans	2002–2008	
Lee Te Maari	Joondalup Giants	St. George Illawarra Dragons, Canterbury Bulldogs, Parramatta Eels	2006–2010	
Curtis Rona	Joondalup Giants	North Queensland Cowboys, Canterbury Bulldogs	2014–2016	
Waqa Blake	Joondalup Giants	Penrith Panthers, Parramatta Eels	2015–	
Anneka Taia-Stephens	Joondalup Giants	St. George Illawarra Dragons	2018–	
Royce Hunt	Willagee Bears	Canberra Raiders, Cronulla, Wests Tigers	2016	
Jordan Pererira	Willagee Bears	St. George Illawarra Dragons, Brisbane Broncos	2018–	
Shanice Parker	Willagee Bears	Sydney Roosters, Newcastle Knights	2019–	
Jackson Topine	Ellenbrook Rabbitohs	Canterbury Bulldogs	2020–2023	
Kennedy Cherrington	Rockingham Coastal Sharks	Sydney Roosters, Parramatta Eels	2020–2024	

== See also ==
- Rugby league in Western Australia
