= South Perth Lions =

Rugby league team in Perth, Western Australia

South Perth Lions RLC
Club information
- Full name: South Perth Lions; Rugby League; Football Club
- Colours: Red; White
- Founded: 1948; 78 years ago

Current details
- Ground: George Burnett Park, South Perth
- Competition: Western Australian Rugby League

South Perth Lions Rugby League Club are an Australian rugby league football club based in South Perth, Western Australia formed in 1948. They conduct teams for both Juniors & Seniors. The club also participates in the WARL (Western Australian Rugby League).

== Notable Juniors ==
- Jon Grieve (1991-97 Manly Warringah Sea Eagles & Western Reds)
- Luke Goodwin (1992-99 Canterbury, Penrith, Perth Reds & Wests)
- Jon Green (2006-13 Cronulla Sharks, St George & Canterbury)
- Bryson Goodwin (2007-20 Cronulla Sharks, South Sydney & Canterbury)
- Bronx Goodwin (2007-12 Cronulla Sharks, St George & Canberra)
- Cory Paterson (2007-19 Newcastle, North Queensland, Wests Tigers & Toronto Wolfpack)
- Kurt De Luis (2021- Manly Sea Eagles)

== See also ==
- Rugby league in Western Australia
