= Rockingham Coastal Sharks =

Rugby league team in Perth, Western Australia

Rockingham Coastal Sharks RLSC
Club information
- Full name: Rockingham Coastal Sharks Rugby League Sporting Club
- Nickname(s): Sharks
- Short name: Rockie Sharks
- Colours: Sky Blue; Black; White
- Founded: 1987

Current details
- Ground(s): Lark Hill Sporting Complex, Rockingham
- CEO: Dale Christy
- Coach: Darren Shaw
- Manager: Harry Brankstone
- Competition: Western Australian Rugby League

Records
- Premierships: 1 (As Rockingham Raiders) (1993)

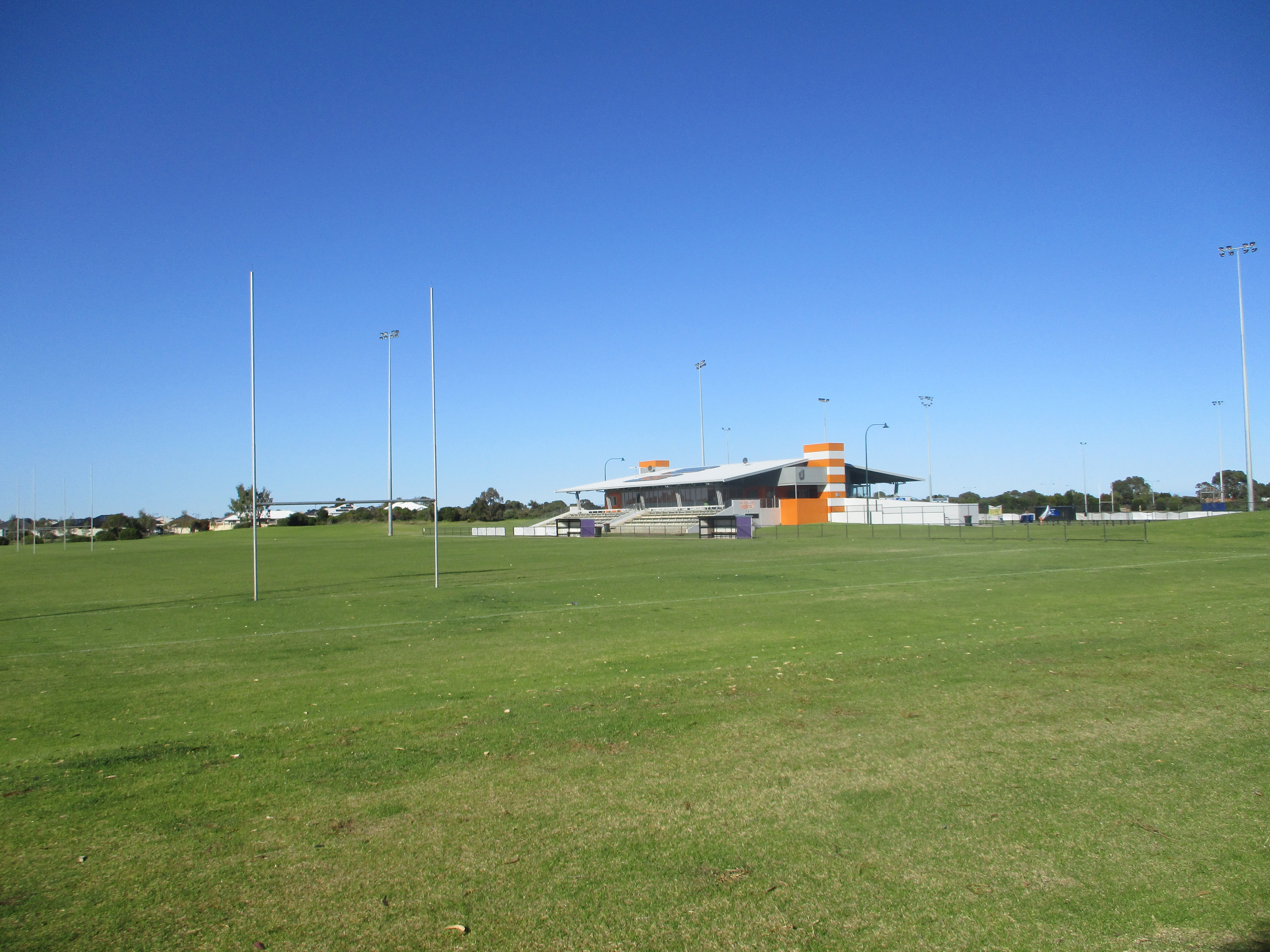
Rockingham Coastal Sharks home ground and club house at Lark Hill Sports Complex.

Rockingham Coastal Sharks Rugby League & Sporting Club is an Australian rugby league football club based at Rockingham, Western Australia formed in 1987 as the Rockingham Raiders. They played their first WARL game in 1988 and the colours were, Primary: Lime Green; Secondary: White; Blue; Yellow. In 2004 the club changed names and colours and became the Rockingham Coastal Sharks after absorbing a minor local team, Coastal Cowboys, into their system. They conduct teams for both junior and senior teams.

== See also ==
- Rugby league in Western Australia
