= West Coast Pirates =

Australian rugby league club, based in Perth, Western Australia

Club information
- Full name: West Coast Pirates; Rugby League Football Club
- Colours: Gold; Red; Black
- Founded: 2012; 14 years ago
- Exited: 2020; 6 years ago

Former details
- Ground: HBF Park (20,500)
- CEO: John Sackson
- Competition: S.G. Ball Cup

Records
- Premierships: 0
- Runners-up: 0
- Minor premierships: 0
- Wooden spoons: 6 (2013, 2014, 2016, 2017, 2018, 2019)

The West Coast Pirates Rugby League Football Club, officially referred to as The Cash Converters West Coast Pirates for sponsorship reasons, was a rugby league football club based in Perth, Western Australia. The club was founded by the Western Australian Rugby League as a bid for Perth to rejoin an expanded National Rugby League in 2026. If successful, the Pirates would have played out of HBF Park, with the support of the Western Australian Government through a $96 million upgrade to the venue. However, the Pirates went into recess in 2020 due to the COVID-19 pandemic.

A new Perth based team will be joining the National Rugby League in 2027, the Perth Bears.

== History ==
Perth had previously competed in the national competition as the Western Reds (from 1995 to 1996) and the Perth Reds (1997), and as the WA Reds in the S.G. Ball Cup from 2006 to 2011.

The Pirates went into recess in 2020 due to the impact of the COVID-19 pandemic, and the SG Ball Cup (the under-19s competition the Pirates competed in) was cancelled mid-season. Due to travel restrictions, financial pressures, and broader uncertainty, the Pirates and other non-NSW-based junior teams were not included in the 2021 SG Ball Cup.

This break affected their visibility and momentum as part of the push for an NRL franchise, but the Pirates development program continued at a local level. The Western Australian Rugby League (WARL) has indicated ongoing interest in NRL inclusion, and they have been involved in junior competitions and talent pathways.

With the introduction of the Perth Bears in 2027, the Bears will become the Western Australian NRL franchise, while the Pirates will cease to exist.

== Name and logo ==
The West Coast Pirates were launched in 2012 after WARL research found that just over 50% of the marketplace associated the Western Reds name with failure. Despite this the club will continue to use the same red, black and gold colours of the Western Reds.

== The Pirates Plan ==
The Pirate's Plan estimates that the club will need two years notice from the NRL to build a competitive squad and aims to be in the top five recognised sporting brands within Australia by 2022. It also identifies the problem WA talent needing to move across the country to play in the NRL and hopes that local players will be able to stay in Western Australia once the club is in the NRL. At the moment players who graduate from the Pirates SG Ball team to the NRL, like Curtis Rona, need to move interstate to continue their career. The Pirates also plan on developing an Intrust Super Premiership side.

== Fan support ==
The West Coast Pirates are widely supported for re-admission into the NRL by players and fans alike. Perth-born players in particular are supportive of Western Australia competing in the NRL once again.

== Players ==
As of 2014 there have been fifteen graduates from the West Coast Pirates that have gone on to earn contracts with NRL clubs, either with the NRL team or with the NRL Under 20's team, including:

- Adam Quinlan
- Curtis Rona
- Waqa Blake
- Jordan Pereira
- Jackson Topine

== Sponsors ==
The following sponsors for the West Coast Pirates include:

- Cash Converters
- McDonald's
- Player (Racing & Wagering WA)
- The Complete Group

== See also ==
- Western Reds
- Western Australia Rugby League
- Rugby league in Western Australia
