= North Beach Sea Eagles =

Rugby league football club in Perth, Western Australia

Club information
- Full name: North Beach Sea Eagles; Rugby League; Football Club
- Colours: Maroon; White
- Founded: 1951

Current details
- Ground: Charles Riley Reserve, North Beach
- Competition: Western Australian Rugby League

Records
- Premierships: 15 (1971, 1974, 1980, 1984, 1985, 1998, 2001, 2003, 2006, 2007, 2012, 2013, 2016, 2021, 2023, 2024)

North Beach Sea Eagles Rugby League Football Club is an Australian rugby league football club based in North Beach, Western Australia formed in the early 1950s.They conduct teams for Juniors, Seniors and also Women's League Tag. In 2016 local junior Roydon Gillett took part in reality TV show The NRL Rookie.

== Notable Juniors ==
Players that represented North Beach Sea Eagles that went on to professional first grade.

- Adrian Barich (1987-92 West Coast Eagles)
- Daniel Holdsworth (2004-14 Cronulla Sharks, St George & Canterbury)
- Josh Rogers (2023- Brisbane Broncos)

== See also ==
- Rugby league in Western Australia
