= Joondalup Giants =

Joondalup Giants RLC
Club information
- Full name: Joondalup & Districts Giants Rugby League Club
- Nickname(s): The Lup, The Giants
- Colours: Maroon; Gold
- Founded: 1990

Current details
- Ground: Admiral Reserve, Joondalup
- Competition: Western Australian Rugby League

Records
- Premierships: 2 (2000,2020)

The Joondalup Giants Rugby League Club is an Australian rugby league football club based in Joondalup, Western Australia that competes in the Western Australian Rugby League. Founded in 1990, the club fields junior teams from u6s through to u16s and senior teams, u18s, Women's league tag, women's tackle, Val Murphy Trophy, Reserve grade and Premiership grade.

The club moved to Arena Joondalup in 2008.

== Notable juniors ==
Notable professional first grade players that have played at Joondalup Giants include:

- Lee Te Maari (2006-10 St George, Canterbury & Parramatta)
- Curtis Rona (2014-16 North Queensland Cowboys & Canterbury-Bankstown Bulldogs)
- Waqa Blake (2015- Penrith Panthers & Parramatta Eels)

== See also ==
- Rugby league in Australia
- Rugby league in Western Australia
- Affiliated States Championship
