= Chance Peni =

New Zealand–born rugby union footballer

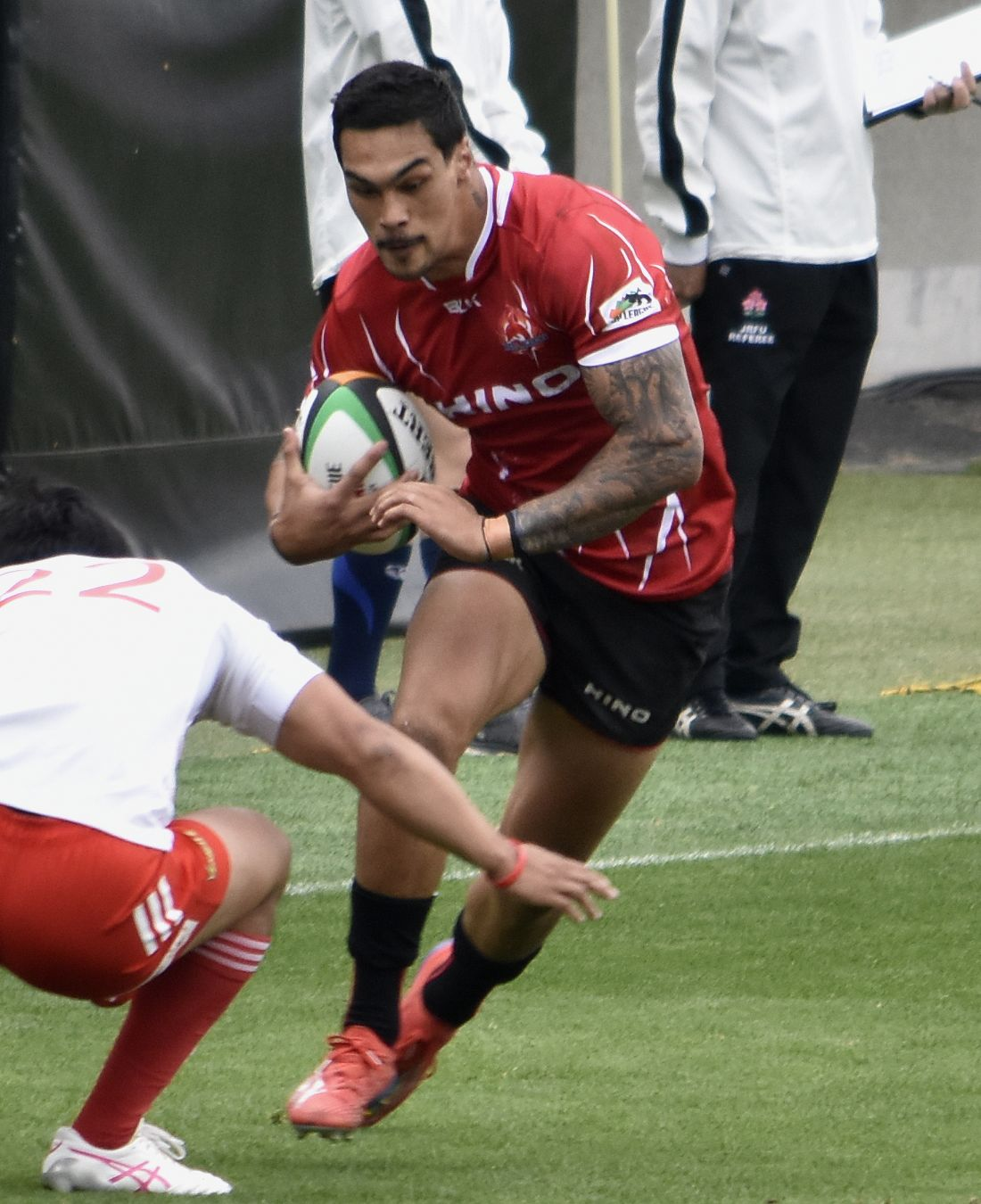
- Peni with the Toyota Industries Shuttles Aichi

Personal information
- Born: Chance Peni-Ataera; 17 January 1994 (age 32) Invercargill, New Zealand
- Height: 190 cm (6 ft 3 in)
- Weight: 97 kg (15 st 4 lb; 214 lb)

Playing information
- Position: Centre
Representative
Years	Team	Pld	T	G	FG	P
2014	New Zealand U20	1	1	0	0	4
2015–16	Cook Islands	2				0

Rugby union career
- Position: Wing / Centre
- Current team: Toyota Industries Shuttles Aichi
Senior career
Years	Team	Apps	(Points)
2017	Perth Spirit	5	(20)
2018	Canberra Vikings	3	(0)
2019–2023	Hino Red Dolphins	25	(90)
2023–	Toyota Industries Shuttles Aichi	34	(140)
Super Rugby
Years	Team	Apps	(Points)
2017	Force	7	(20)
2018–2019	Brumbies	10	(25)
- Correct as of 20 February 2021

Chance Peni-Ataera (born 17 January 1994) is a New Zealand-born rugby union footballer who plays for the Hino Red Dolphins in the Japan Rugby League One competition. He has previously played rugby league for the Cook Islands at international level.

== Background ==
Peni was born in Invercargill, New Zealand. He is of Cook Islands and Māori descent.

Although Peni was born in New Zealand, with a short period in the Chatham Islands, he moved to Perth, Western Australia, at a young age, playing rugby for Wests Subiaco and playing for Willagee Bears in the Western Australian Rugby League. He then moved to Newcastle, New South Wales, and playing for the Western Suburbs Rosellas before being signed by the Newcastle Knights. Peni was educated at Aranmore Catholic College in Perth.

== Rugby league ==
Peni played for the Newcastle Knights NYC team in 2013 and 2014. On 10 October 2014, Peni signed a two-year deal with the Wests Tigers, starting from 2015. On 18 October 2014, Peni represented the Junior Kiwis against the Junior Kangaroos, playing on the wing and scoring a try in the 15–14 win at Mt Smart Stadium.

Peni played for the Wests Tigers New South Wales Cup team for the whole 2015 season. On 17 October 2015, Peni represented the Cook Islands in their World Cup qualifier match against the Tonga, playing at centre in the 28–8 loss at Campbelltown Stadium.

== Rugby union ==
=== Force ===
In 2017, Peni returned home to Perth to play rugby, signing for the Western Force of the Super Rugby. In round two of the 2017 season Peni scored his first try for the team. A pass from Jono Lance after a line out, followed by an explosive run, which lead Peni to a quick try one minute into the game against the Reds. They finished 26–19 winners at nib Stadium, Perth. In June 2017, Peni re-signed for the Force for another two years, with the ARU vowing to honour player contracts despite the team being axed from the competition. Peni missed eight rounds of the 2017 season after rupturing his groin during a game against the Kings in round seven. Peni played seven games during the 2017 season scoring four tries.

=== Brumbies ===
In November 2017, after a breakout first Super Rugby season Peni left the now axed Super Rugby team the Western Force and signed a one-year deal for the Brumbies for the 2018 season, in hopes of playing future rugby for the Wallabies. Peni scored his first try for the Brumbies in round four of the 2018 season against the Rebels in a 33–10 defeat at AAMI Park, Melbourne.

== Super Rugby statistics ==
Season	Team	Games	Starts	Sub	Mins	Tries	Cons	Pens	Drops	Points	Yel	Red
2017	Force	7	7	0	477	4	0	0	0	20	1	0
2018	Brumbies	3	3	0	202	1	0	0	0	5	0	0
Total		10	10	0	679	5	0	0	0	25	1	0
