= Willagee Bears =

Rugby league team in Perth, Western Australia

Club information
- Full name: Willagee Bears Rugby League Football Club
- Short name: Bears
- Colours: Black; White; Red
- Founded: 1962

Current details
- Ground: Webber Reserve, Willagee
- Competition: Western Australian Rugby League

Willagee Bears Rugby League Club is an Australian rugby league football club based in Willagee, Western Australia formed in the early 1960s. They conduct teams for both junior and senior teams.

== Notable Juniors ==
- Shanice Parker (2015- Australian Jillaroos)
- Chance Peni (2013-14 Newcastle Knights U20)
- Royce Hunt (2017 Canberra Raiders & Cronulla-Sutherland Sharks)
- Jordan Pererira (2018- St George Illawarra Dragons)

== See also ==
- Rugby league in Western Australia
