= Goldfields Titans =

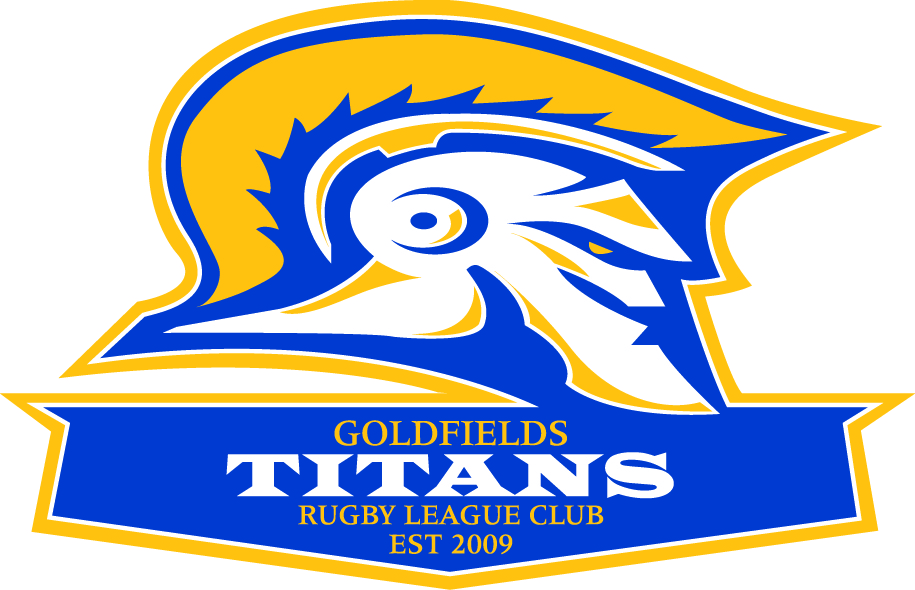

Club information
- Full name: Goldfields Titans Rugby League Club Inc.
- Nickname: Titans
- Founded: 2009

Current details
- Coach: Mark Tuulau
- Competition: Western Australian Rugby League

Records
- Premierships: 0

The Goldfields Titans was a semi professional rugby league club based in Kalgoorlie-Boulder, Western Australia, Australia. They competed in the Western Australia Rugby League's Harvey Norman Cup first grade competition and home games were played at the Goldfields Oasis Playing Fields.

Goldfields Titans had a major sponsorship deal with local mining company Paddington Gold Mine.

== History ==
Goldfields Titans Rugby League Football Club was part of the Western Australian Rugby League Tooheys Cup Competition.

The Goldfields Titans home ground was located at the Oasis Playing Fields next to the Goldfields Oasis Leisure Centre.

== Notable juniors ==
- Royce Hunt (2017- Canberra Raiders)

== Articles ==
- Thumbs up for Titans
- Gruelling Travel Schedule

== See also ==
- Western Australia Rugby League
- WA Reds

== Sources ==
- Kalgoorlie Miner
- Western Australian Rugby League
- The West Australian
