= Fremantle Roosters =

Sporting club in Fremantle, Western Australia

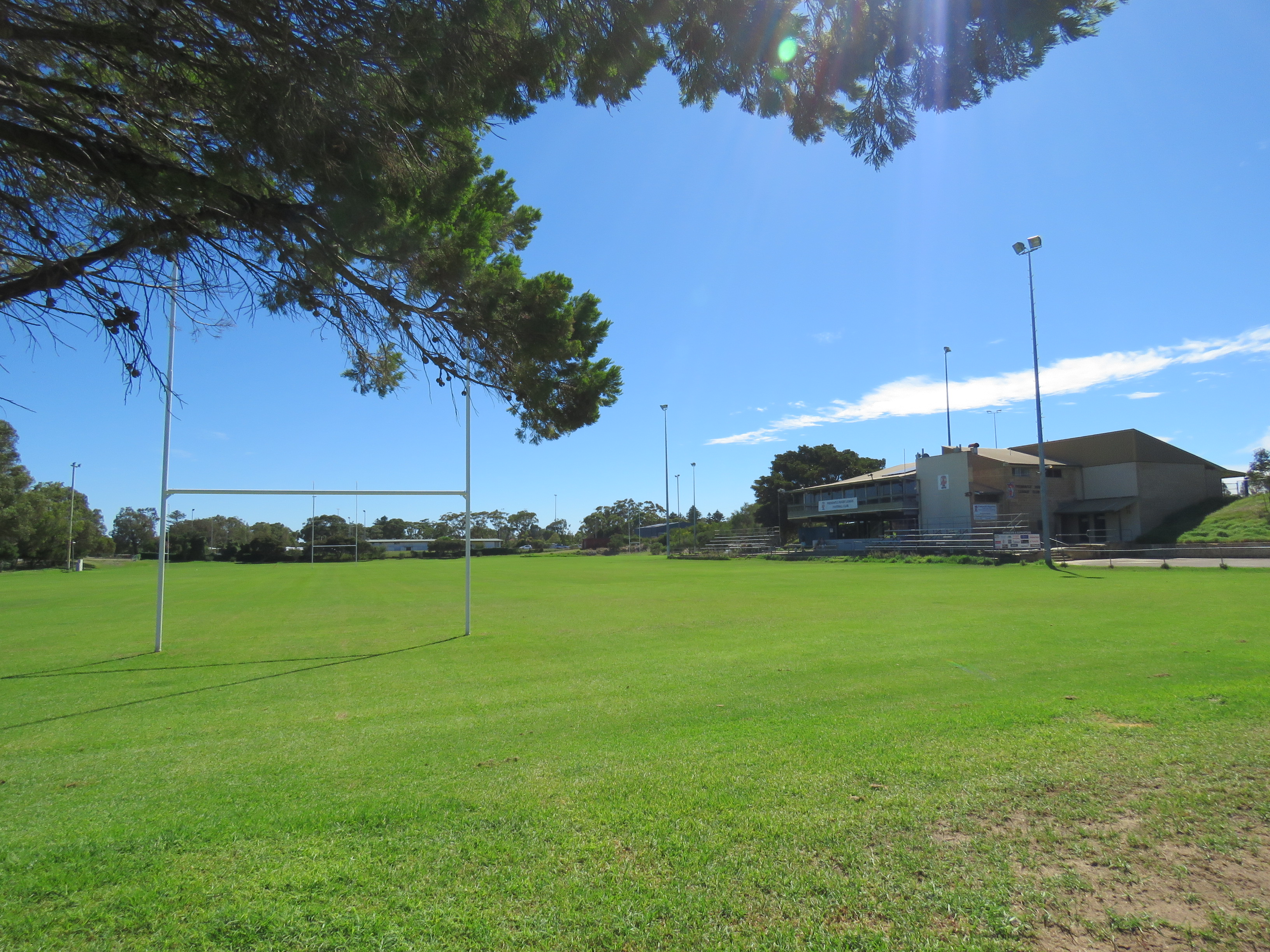

Club information
- Full name: Fremantle and Districts Rugby League Football Club Inc
- Nickname(s): Roosters
- Short name: Fremantle Cockburn RLFC
- Colours: Royal blue White; Red
- Founded: 1948; 77 years ago

Current details
- Ground(s): Treeby Reserve
- Competition: Western Australian Rugby League NRLWA

Records
- Premierships: 12 (1950, 1961, 1963, 1976, 1977, 1981, 1997, 2015, 2017, 2018, 2019, 2022)

Fremantle Roosters Rugby League Club is an Australian rugby league football club based in Western Australia formed in 1948 (from rugby union). They conduct teams for both junior and senior with Premiership grade, Reserve grade, Women's contact and Women's league tag, and girls and boys starting from 4 years old to 18 in juniors

== Bryce Trophy / Ken Allen Medal winners ==
=== Bryce Trophy ===
- 1954 Arthur Smith
- 1965 Ian White
- 1966 Peter McLarty
- 1969 Noel Williams
- 1973 Alec Lockley
- 1974 Gary Hookman
- 1975 Alec Lockley
- 1977 Alec Lockley
- 1982 Alec Lockley
- 1987 Russell May
- 1991 Duncan Whitchurch

=== Ken Allen Medal ===
- 1993 Gavin Jones
- 1997 Kere Perata
- 1999 Brad Baker
- 2012 Samson Graham
- 2018 Delane Edwards
- 2023 Duane Butler

== Notable Juniors ==
- Russell Addison (1960-61 South Sydney Rabbitohs)
- Brian Wedgewood (1967-70 Canterbury Bulldogs)

== See also ==
- Rugby league in Western Australia
