= Royce Hunt =

Samoa international rugby league footballer

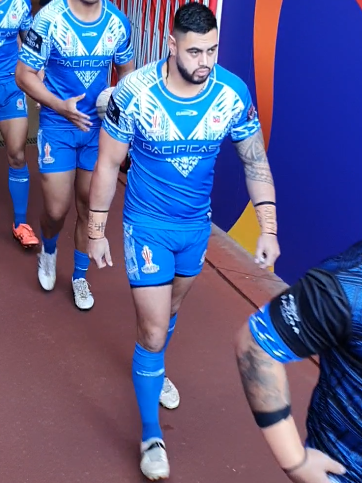

Personal information
- Born: 13 August 1995 (age 31) Liverpool, New South Wales, Australia
- Height: 183 cm (6 ft 0 in)
- Weight: 114 kg (17 st 13 lb)

Playing information
- Position: Prop
Club
Years	Team	Pld	T	G	FG	P
2017	Canberra Raiders	1	0	0	0	0
2020–24	Cronulla Sharks	75	8	0	0	32
2025–	Wests Tigers	28	4	0	0	16
	Total	104	12	0	0	48
Representative
Years	Team	Pld	T	G	FG	P
2022–25	Māori All Stars	4	0	0	0	0
2022–23	Samoa	6	1	0	0	4
- Source: As of 7 June 2026

Royce Hunt (born 13 August 1995) is a Samoa international rugby league footballer who plays as a prop for the Wests Tigers in the National Rugby League (NRL).

Hunt previously played for the Canberra Raiders and Cronulla Sharks in the NRL.

== Early life ==
Hunt was born in Liverpool, Sydney, and raised in Kalgoorlie. He is of Samoan, Hawaiian and Maori descent. He was educated at Kalgoorlie State High School.

Hunt played his junior rugby league for the Willagee Bears and Goldfields Titans in the Western Australia Rugby League, before being signed by the Canterbury-Bankstown Bulldogs.

Arriving at Canterbury-Bankstown Bulldogs, Hunt attended Bass High School and represented the 2013 Australian Schoolboys.

== Playing career ==
=== Early career ===
In 2014 and 2015, Hunt played for the Canterbury-Bankstown Bulldogs' NYC team. In 2016, he joined the Mount Pritchard Mounties in the Intrust Super Premiership NSW. After impressing for the Mounties, he gained a contract with the Canberra Raiders for 2017.

=== 2017 ===
In round 14 of the 2017 NRL season, Hunt made his NRL debut for Canberra against the Penrith Panthers.

=== 2018 ===
Hunt made no first grade appearances for Canberra in the 2018 NRL season instead playing for Mounties in the Canterbury Cup NSW competition.

=== 2019 ===
Hunt made no appearances for Canberra in the 2019 NRL season. Hunt instead played against for Mounties in the Canterbury Cup NSW competition as they qualified for the finals finishing in 6th place. Hunt played in Mounties elimination final loss against Newtown at Campbelltown Stadium.

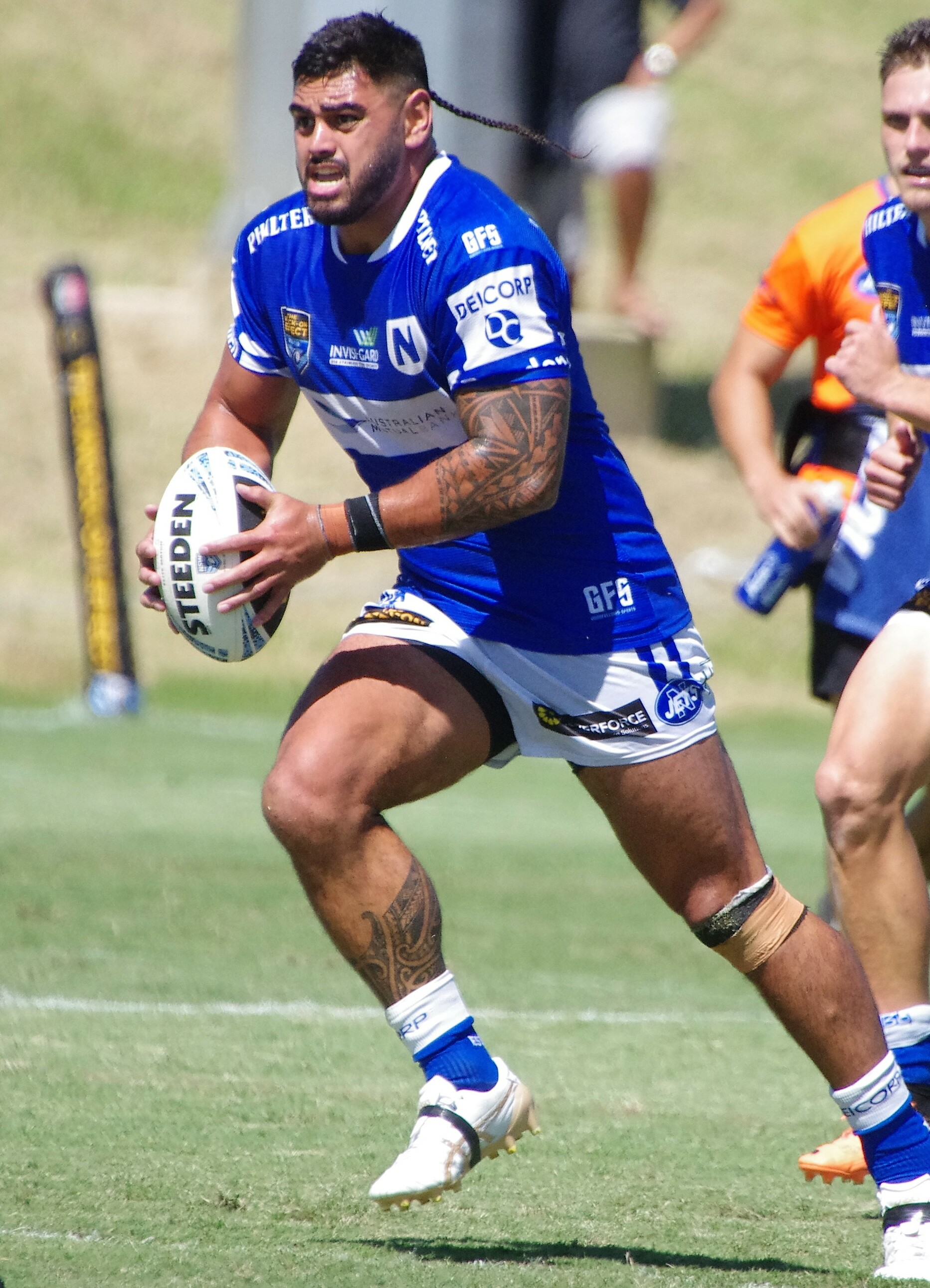
Hunt playing for the Newtown Jets in 2022

On 13 October, it was announced that Hunt had been released by Canberra.

=== 2020 ===
In early 2020, Hunt signed a contract to join Cronulla-Sutherland for the 2020 NRL season.

In round 8 of the 2020 NRL season, Hunt scored his first try for Cronulla-Sutherland and his first in the top grade as Cronulla defeated the Gold Coast 40–10 at Cbus Super Stadium.

In round 19 against the Sydney Roosters, Hunt was taken from the field during the second half of the game with a leg injury. It was later revealed Hunt had dislocated his right kneecap.

=== 2021 ===
Hunt played only two games for Cronulla in the 2021 NRL season which saw the club narrowly miss the finals by finishing 9th on the table.

=== 2022 ===
Hunt played a total of 19 games for Cronulla in the 2022 NRL season as the club finished second on the table. Hunt played in Cronulla's qualifying final loss to North Queensland but did not feature in Cronulla's elimination semi-final loss to South Sydney.

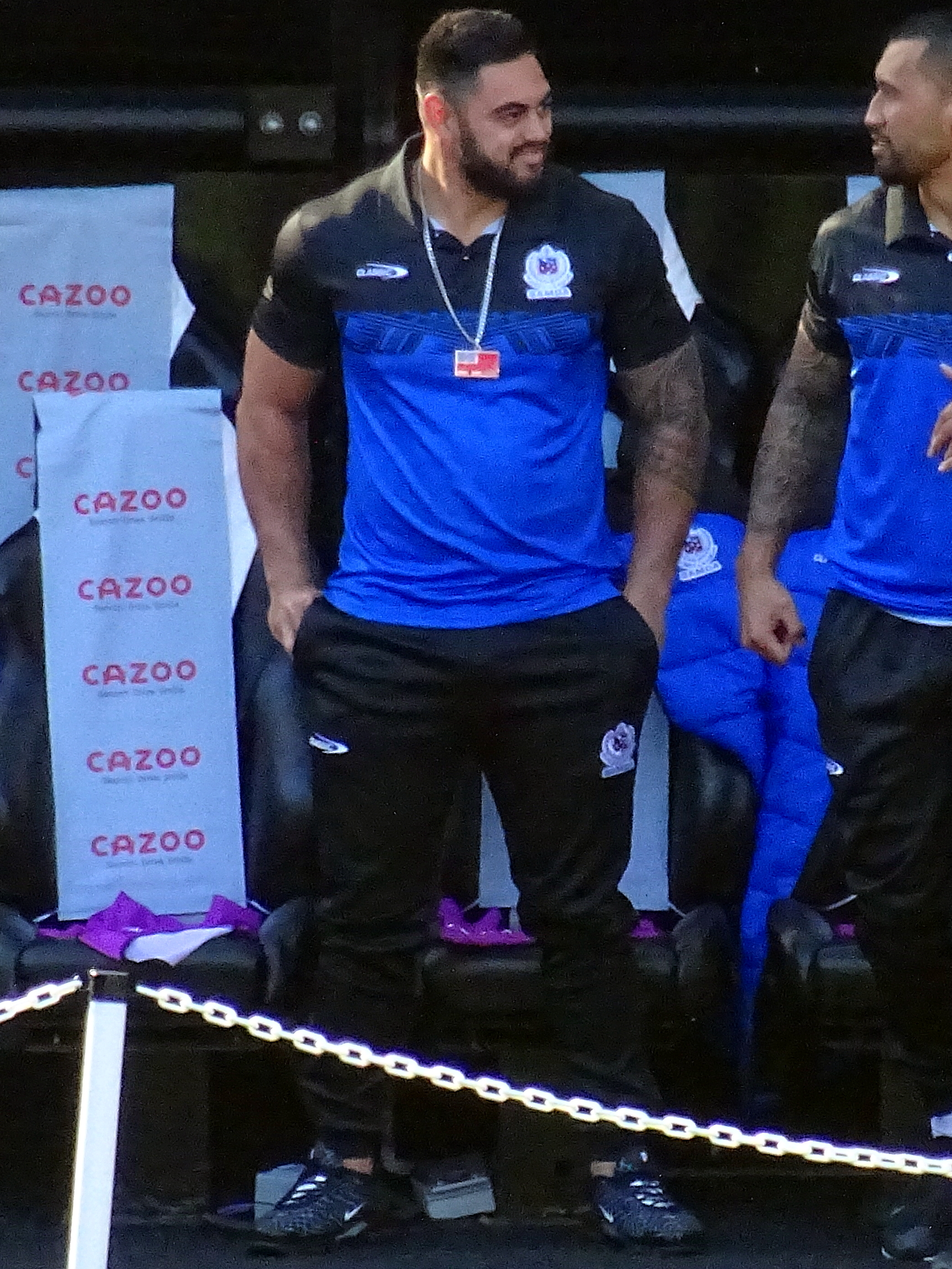
Hunt on international duty with Samoa in 2022

In October Hunt was named in the Samoa squad for the 2021 Rugby League World Cup. Hunt played for Samoa in their 2021 Rugby League World Cup final loss to Australia.

=== 2023 ===
Hunt represented New Zealand Māori all stars team as starting prop, losing against the Australian Indigenous team, 28–24.

In round 3 of the 2023 NRL season, Hunt was sent to the sin bin during Cronulla's 24–20 loss against Canberra for punching Corey Horsburgh. Following the match, Hunt spoke with the media and accused Horsburgh of hiding behind other players. Hunt went on to say “As Ricky Stuart would say, he's a weak-gutted dog, We'll get him next game, I have never seen a front-rower hide behind a halfback, You can't just hold me in and push me over and not expect anything. I was a bit upset about that". Hunt played a total of 20 games for Cronulla in the 2023 NRL season as Cronulla finished sixth on the table. Hunt played in the clubs 13–12 upset loss against the Sydney Roosters which ended their season.

=== 2024 ===
On 18 March, it was announced that Hunt would miss at least 2-4 weeks with a calf injury. On 3 September, Hunt was granted a release from his final year of his contract to join a three-year deal with the Wests Tigers for the 2025 season.

=== 2025 ===
In round 1 of the 2025 NRL season, Hunt made his club debut for the Wests Tigers against Newcastle. Hunt played 16 matches for the Wests Tigers in the 2025 NRL season as the club finished 13th on the table.

=== 2026 ===
Hunt was limited to just twelve matches for the Wests Tigers in the 2026 NRL season as the club finished 15th on the table.

== Statistics ==
=== NRL ===
*denotes season competing

Season	Team	Matches	T	G	GK %	F/G	Pts
2017	Canberra Raiders	1	0	0	—	0	0
2020	Cronulla-Sutherland	14	1	0	—	0	4
2021	Cronulla-Sutherland	2	0	0	—	0	0
2022	Cronulla-Sutherland	19	3	0	—	0	12
2023	Cronulla-Sutherland	20	3				8
2024	Cronulla-Sutherland	20	1				4
2025	Wests Tigers	16	2				8
2026	Wests Tigers	12	2				8
Career totals		103	12	0	—	0	48

=== All Star ===
Season	Team	Matches	T	G	GK %	F/G	Pts
2022	Māori All Stars	1	0	0	—	0	0
Career totals		1	0	0	—	0	0

=== International ===
Season	Team	Matches	T	G	GK %	F/G	Pts
2022	Samoa	5	1	0	—	0	4
Career totals		6	1	0	—	0	4
