= S. G. Ball Cup =

Australian junior rugby competition

- Sport: Rugby league
- Instituted: 1965
- Inaugural season: 1965
- Number of teams: 16
- Country: Australia
- Premiers: Sydney Roosters (6th title) (2026)
- Most titles: Parramatta (14 titles)
- Website: S. G. Ball Cup
- Related competition: Harold Matthews Cup; Laurie Daley Cup; Mal Meninga Cup

The S. G. Ball Cup is a junior rugby league football competition played predominantly in New South Wales, between teams made up of male players aged under 19. Teams from Canberra, Melbourne, and Auckland also participate. Prior to the COVID-19 pandemic in New South Wales a team from Perth (West Coast) also participated. The competition is administered by the New South Wales Rugby League, and includes both junior representative teams of NRL and NSWRL clubs that do not field a team in the NRL.

The S. G. Ball Cup is named after S. G. "George" Ball, one of the five people responsible for the formation of South Sydney, and who was club secretary for over fifty years.

== Clubs ==
In 2026, 17 clubs fielded teams in the NSWRL S G Ball Cup.

- Balmain
- Canberra
- Canterbury
- Central Coast
- Cronulla
- Illawarra
- Manly
- Melbourne
- Newcastle
- New Zealand (Auckland)
- North Sydney
- Parramatta
- Penrith
- Souths
- St George
- Sydney (Eastern Suburbs)
- Western Suburbs

In 2020, 18 clubs fielded teams in the NSWRL S G Ball Cup. After the sixth round on March 14 & 15, the 2020 competition was suspended and subsequently cancelled due to the COVID-19 pandemic in Australia. Three teams from 2020 that did not return in 2021 were Central Coast, New Zealand, and West Coast. New Zealand returned in 2023. Central Coast returned in 2026.

Previous teams that participated in the SG Ball Cup include: Gold Coast (2008–09), Newtown (1970s, early 1980s & 2009), and the Western Sydney Academy of Sport (2007–17).

Eastern Suburbs changed their name to Sydney City and then Sydney.

Central Coast and Sydney both compete as the Roosters. Typically, Sydney compete in navy blue jerseys with red and white chevrons, whilst the Central Coast compete in white jerseys with red and navy blue chevrons.

Melbourne Storm competed in the S.G. Ball Cup from 2009 to 2014, did not compete from 2015 to 2018, and competed as the Victoria Thunderbolts from 2020 to 2022. The club returned as the Melbourne Storm from the 2023 season.

== S. G. Ball Cup Premiers ==
=== 1965 to Current ===
Year	Premiers	Score	Runners up	Minor Premiers	Wooden Spoon	Notes
1965	Souths	5 – 4	Canterbury	Not applicable – Knock-Out Competition		
1966	Parramatta	12 – 0	Souths	Parramatta	Norths	
1967	Parramatta	7 – 2	Souths	Canterbury	Newtown	
1968	Parramatta	7 – 4	Souths	Parramatta	Norths	
1969	Souths	13 – 3	Penrith	Souths	Newtown	
1970	St George	12 – 10	Parramatta	Souths	Easts	
1971	Wests	7 – 3	Souths	Souths	Newtown	
1972	Canterbury	13 – 8	Parramatta	Parramatta	Norths	
1973	Parramatta	19 – 10	Penrith	Penrith	Norths	
1974	Souths	12 – 8	Balmain	Balmain	Norths	
1975	Souths	13 – 2	St George	Parramatta	Newtown	
1976	Souths	28 – 3	Wests	Souths	Norths	
1977	Penrith	5 – 2	Parramatta			
1978	Canterbury	14 – 0	Penrith	12 teams split into 2 zones of 6 teams. Semi-Finals were: Zone 1 1st-place vs Zone 2 2nd-place, Zone 2 1st-place vs Zone 1 2nd-place.		
1979	Souths	8 – 0	Balmain	12 teams split into 2 zones of 6 teams. Semi-Finals were: Zone 1 1st-place vs Zone 2 2nd-place, Zone 2 1st-place vs Zone 1 2nd-place.		
1980	Souths	23 – 10	Balmain	12 teams split into 2 zones of 6 teams. Semi-Finals were: Zone 1 1st-place vs Zone 2 2nd-place, Zone 2 1st-place vs Zone 1 2nd-place.		
1981	Penrith	18 – 9	Balmain	12 teams split into 2 zones of 6 teams. Semi-Finals were: Zone 1 1st-place vs Zone 2 2nd-place, Zone 2 1st-place vs Zone 1 2nd-place.		
1982	Balmain	25 – 16	Newtown	Cronulla	Easts	
1983	Parramatta	30 – 0	Wests	Wests	Newtown	
1984	St George	18 – 16	Parramatta	Parramatta	Wests	
1985	Parramatta	32 – 12	St George	Canterbury	Wests	
1986	Souths	16 – 8	Parramatta	Souths		
1987	Parramatta	32 – 10	Canberra	Parramatta	Easts	
1988	Parramatta	20 – 10	Penrith			
1989	Illawarra	32 – 22	Penrith	Illawarra	Easts	
1990	Newcastle	23 – 10	Manly	Newcastle	Easts	
1991	Parramatta	32 – 6	Manly	Manly	Easts	
1992	St George	20 – 0	Canterbury	St George	Easts	
1993	Parramatta	28 – 20	St George			
1994	Souths	22 – 20	Newcastle			
1995	Canberra	36 – 6	Penrith	Canberra		
1996	Illawarra	8 – 0	Parramatta	Illawarra	Canterbury	
1997	Sydney City (Easts)	11 – 10	Newcastle	Newcastle		
1998	Souths	20 – 16	Manly	Illawarra	Canterbury	
1999	Parramatta	38 – 6	Illawarra	Parramatta	St George	
2000	Penrith	28 – 24	Illawarra	Newcastle	Wests	
2001	Newcastle	34 – 26	Penrith	Parramatta	St George	
2002	Wests	18 – 16	Parramatta	Illawarra	Manly	
2003	Canberra	16 – 4	Parramatta	Parramatta	St George	
2004	Newcastle	42 – 16	Souths	Sydney (Easts)	Norths	
2005	Canberra	34 – 12	Illawarra	Parramatta	Norths	
2006	Penrith	18 – 16	Souths	Parramatta	Norths	
2007	Parramatta	22 – 12	Penrith	Penrith	Western Sydney (A)	
2008	Sydney (Easts)	38 – 20	Parramatta	Canterbury	Norths	
2009	Canterbury	42 – 16	Melbourne	St George	Wests	
2010	Sydney (Easts)	28 – 24	Parramatta	Cronulla	Central Coast	
2011	Newcastle	25 – 24	Canterbury	Wests	Western Sydney (A)	
2012	Balmain	42 – 20	Canberra	Balmain	Western Sydney (A)	
2013	Balmain	14 – 6	Penrith	Penrith	West Coast	
2014	Sydney (Easts)	34 – 30 (iet)	Penrith	Parramatta	West Coast	
2015	Cronulla	24 – 16	Souths	Canberra	Norths	
2016	Penrith	25 – 10	Illawarra	Newcastle	West Coast	
2017	Parramatta	30 – 22	Cronulla	Cronulla	West Coast	
2018	Penrith	25 – 14	Canterbury	Sydney (Easts)	West Coast	
2019	Illawarra	34 – 23	Manly	Manly	West Coast	
2020	Season was suspended due to the COVID-19 pandemic.					
2021	Canberra	18 – 14	Illawarra	Sydney (Easts)	Norths	
2022	Penrith	22 – 20	Sydney (Easts)	Sydney (Easts)	Victoria (Melbourne)	
2023	Parramatta	28 – 22	Newcastle	Canberra	Melbourne	
2024	St George	40 – 18	Canterbury	Sydney (Easts)	Balmain	
2025	Sydney (Easts)	33 – 26 (aet)	Parramatta	Parramatta	Norths	
2026	Sydney (Easts)	28 – 24	Newcastle	Souths	Central Coast	

Notes:

- U16/s from 1965 until 2005
- U18/s from 2006 until 2020
- U19/s from 2021 onwards

== Premiership Tally ==
No.	Club	Seasons
**1**	Parramatta	**14** (1966, 1967, 1968, 1973, 1983, 1985, 1987, 1988, 1991, 1993, 1999, 2007, 2017, 2023)
**2**	South Sydney	**10** (1965, 1969, 1974, 1975, 1976, 1979, 1980, 1986, 1994, 1998)
**3**	Penrith	**7** (1977, 1981, 2000, 2006, 2016, 2018, 2022)
**4**	Sydney (Eastern Suburbs)	**6** (1997, 2008, 2010, 2014, 2025, 2026)
**5**	Canberra	**4** (1995, 2003, 2005, 2021)
**5**	Newcastle	**4** (1990, 2001, 2004, 2011)
**5**	St George	**4** (1970, 1984, 1992, 2024)
**8**	Canterbury	**3** (1972, 1978, 2009)
**8**	Balmain	**3** (1982, 2012, 2013)
**8**	Illawarra	**3** (1989, 1996, 2019)
**11**	Western Suburbs	**2** (1971, 2002)
**12**	Cronulla	**1** (2015)
—	Manly	**0**
—	Norths	**0**

Bold means the team is currently taking part in the competition.

== See also ==
- Harold Matthews Cup
- Laurie Daley Cup
- Mal Meninga Cup
- Tarsha Gale Cup
- Rugby League Competitions in Australia
- Rugby League Competitions in New South Wales
- Rugby League Competitions in New Zealand
