= Jon Green =

Australian rugby league footballer

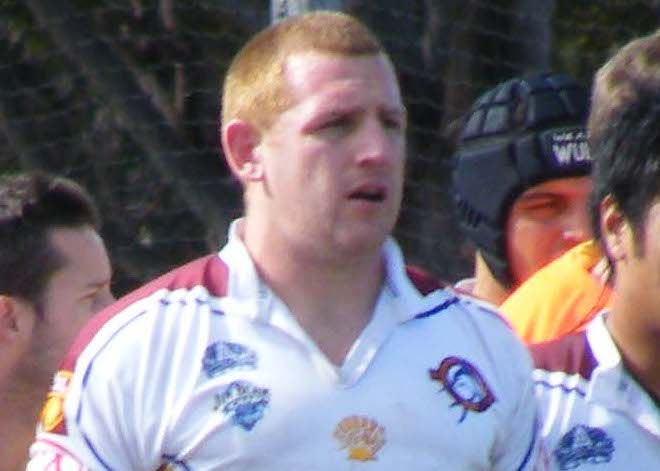

Personal information
- Full name: Jon Green
- Born: 16 July 1985 (age 41) Southport, Queensland, Australia

Playing information
- Height: 191 cm (6 ft 3 in)
- Weight: 106 kg (16 st 10 lb)
- Position: Prop
Club
| Years | Team | Pld | T | G | FG | P |
|---|---|---|---|---|---|---|
| 2006–07 | Canterbury Bulldogs | 6 | 0 | 0 | 0 | 0 |
| 2008–11 | St. George Illawarra | 52 | 2 | 0 | 0 | 8 |
| 2012–13 | Cronulla Sharks | 8 | 0 | 0 | 0 | 0 |
| | Total | 66 | 2 | 0 | 0 | 8 |

Jon Green (born 16 July 1985) is an Australian former professional rugby league footballer. He played for the Canterbury-Bankstown Bulldogs, St. George Illawarra Dragons and Cronulla-Sutherland Sharks.

== Early life ==
Green was born in Southport, Queensland, Australia.

Green lived in Perth and played junior footy for South Perth Lions in the Western Australia Rugby League competition.

== Career ==
Green began playing in the National Rugby League in 2006 for the Bulldogs club, playing six games for them over the next seasons.

Green joined the St. George Illawarra Dragons club in 2007, and was generally assigned to play for St. George Illawarra Dragons's feeder club (the Shellharbour Dragons) as a Prop. Green was afforded the opportunity to play for St. George Illawarra Dragons from time to time, mainly during the representative season. In August 2010, it was confirmed that Green had his contract extended for a further season to see him stay at St. George Illawarra Dragons until the end of the 2011 season. In February 2011, he contributed to the team's victory in the 2011 World Club Challenge against the Wigan Warriors.

Green has signed with the Cronulla-Sutherland Sharks for the 2012 NRL season. He was signed to help replace the loss of Luke Douglas and Kade Snowden. Green joined the Brisbane Broncos in 2014. In 2015, Green announced his retirement from league after playing for the Brisbane feeder club, Redcliffe Dolphins.
