= Josh Rogers (rugby league) =

Australian rugby league footballer (born 1996)

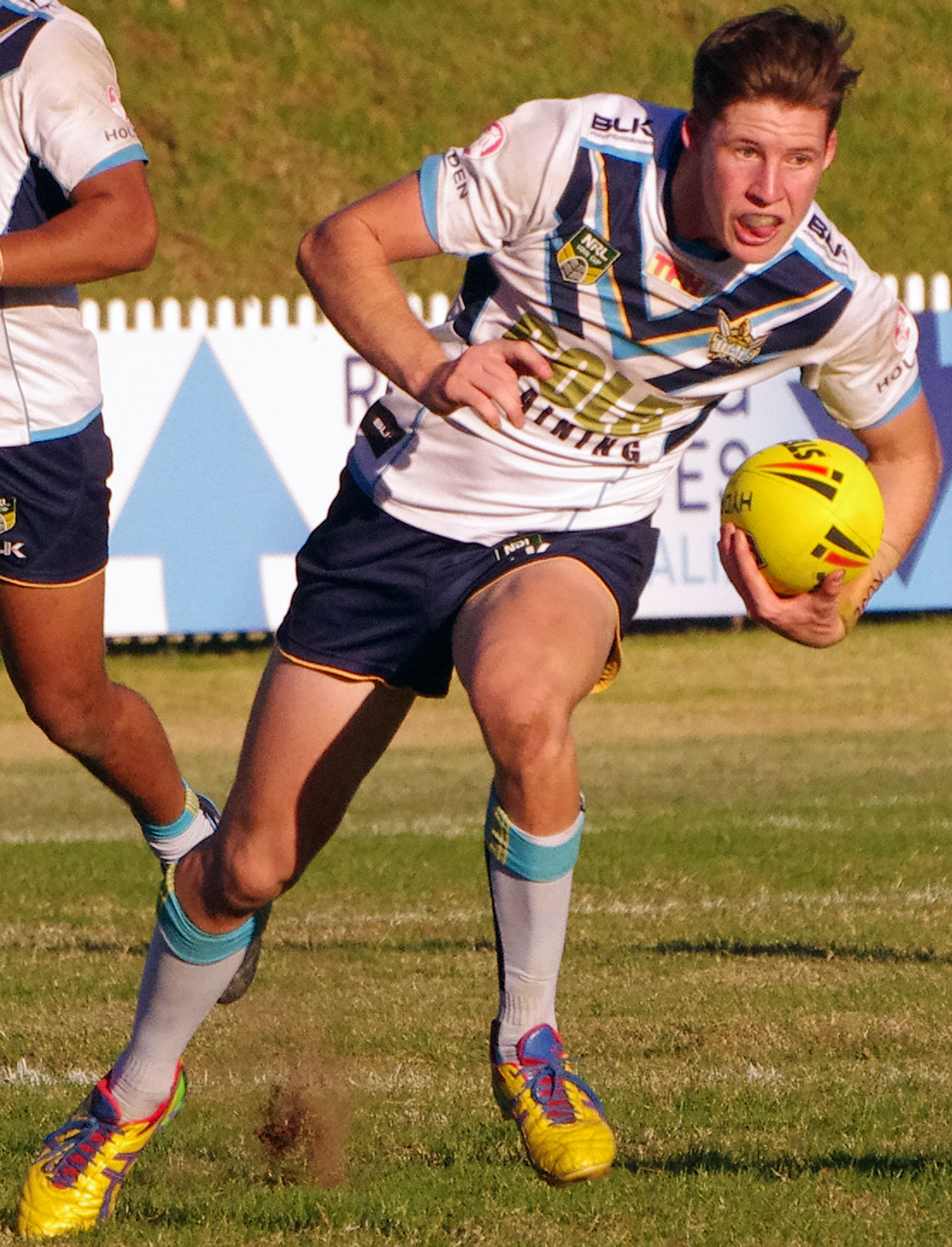

Personal information
- Full name: Josh Rogers
- Born: 11 June 1996 (age 30) Perth, Western Australia, Australia
- Height: 186 cm (6 ft 1 in)
- Weight: 91 kg (14 st 5 lb)

Playing information
- Position: Five-eighth, Halfback, Hooker
Club
Years	Team	Pld	T	G	FG	P
2023–	Brisbane Broncos	11	3	5	0	22
- Source: As of 11 June 2026

Josh Rogers (born 11 June 1996) is an Australian rugby league footballer who plays as a five-eighth and halfback for the Brisbane Broncos in the National Rugby League (NRL).

== Playing career ==
=== Early career ===
Rogers was born in Perth in 1996, playing junior rugby league for the North Beach Sea Eagles in the NRLWA competition.

After moving to Queensland from Western Australia, Rogers played for the Burleigh Bears in their 2015 Hastings Deering Colts Grand final against Wynnum Manly Seagulls which they won 26–12.

In 2016 Rogers Won the Gold Coast Titans NYC player of the year.

Rogers played under 20's for the Gold Coast Titans before moving up to the Burleigh Bears in 2018, playing in the Queensland Cup. He came off the bench in the 2019 grand final and State Championship. He played 66 games for the Bears between 2018 and 2022. After winning the Hostplus Cup five-eighth of the year and top point scorer awards in 2022, Rogers earned a development deal with the Brisbane Broncos.

Rogers spent most of the 2023 season playing for Wynnum Manly in the Hostplus Cup, setting a new club record for most points in a season (241).

=== First Grade Career ===
As a result of his strong Hostplus Cup performances, Rogers made his first grade debut in round 27 of the 2023 NRL season against the Melbourne Storm, kicking five goals. Rogers played six games for Brisbane in the 2024 NRL season which saw the club miss the finals finishing 12th on the table. Rogers made no appearances for Brisbane in the 2025 NRL season but did win a second Queensland Cup premiership playing for feeder club the Burleigh Bears, scoring a try in the grand final. Rogers featured in just four games with Brisbane in the 2026 NRL season as the club finished 14th on the table.
