= Kurt De Luis =

Australian rugby league footballer

Kurt de Luis
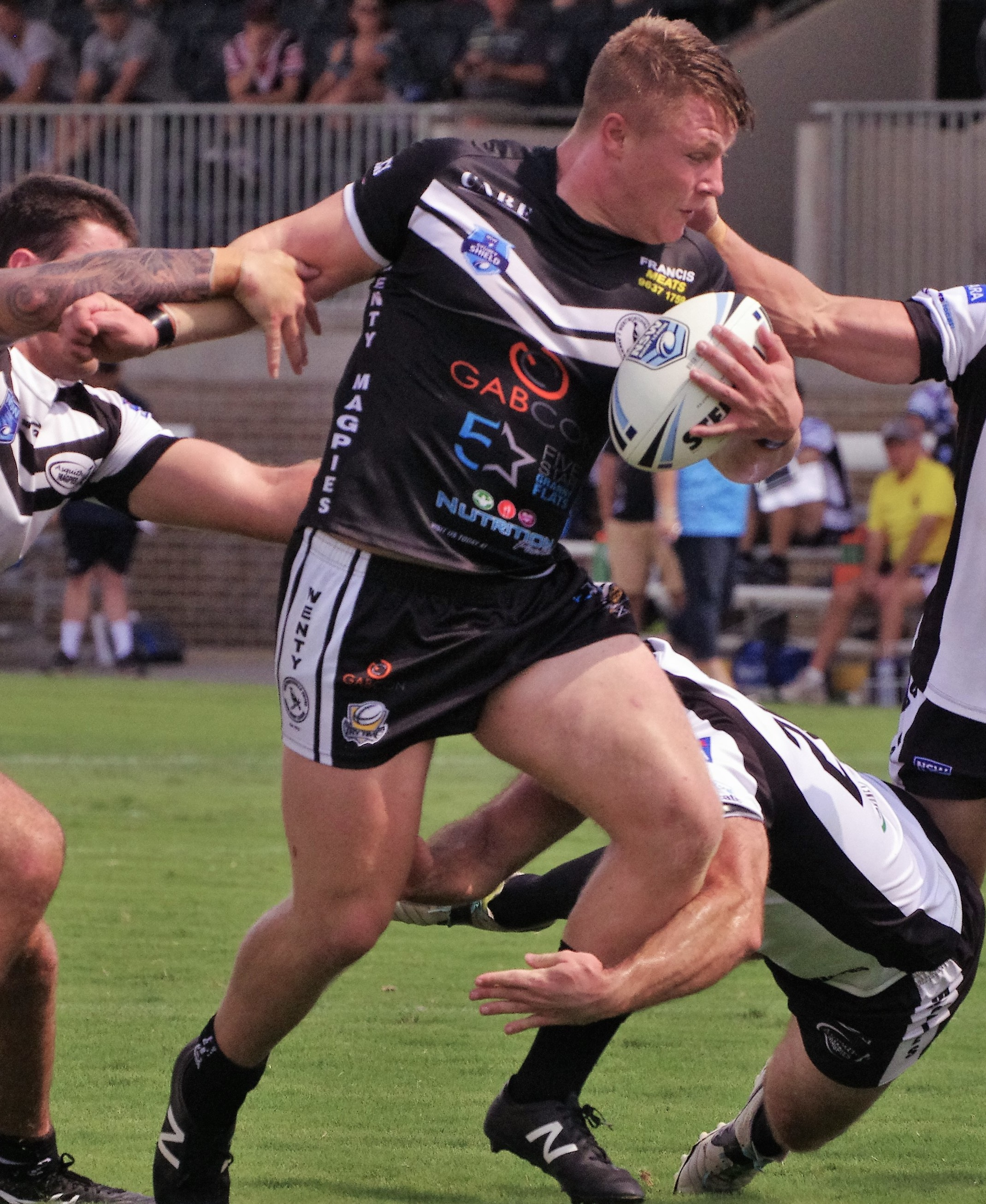

Personal information
- Full name: Kurt De Luis
- Born: 18 February 1996 (age 30) Perth, Western Australia, Australia
- Height: 185 cm (6 ft 1 in)
- Weight: 105 kg (16 st 7 lb)

Playing information
- Position: Prop
Club
Years	Team	Pld	T	G	FG	P
2021–22	Manly Sea Eagles	12	0	0	0	0
- Source: As of 10 June 2021

Kurt De Luis (born 18 February 1996) is a professional rugby league footballer who plays as a prop for the North Sydney Bears in the NSW Cup.

He previously played for the Manly Warringah Sea Eagles in the National Rugby League (NRL).

== Background ==
De Luis played his junior football for the South Perth Lions in the Perth Rugby League before signing with the Townsville Stingers under 18s side.

== Playing career ==
He then joined the Parramatta Eels under 20s and NSW Cup teams before linking up with the Blacktown Workers in 2019. In round 14 of the 2021 NRL season, De Luis made his first grade debut for Manly-Warringah against North Queensland. In November 2022, De Luis signed a contract to join Manly's arch-rivals North Sydney ahead of the 2023 season. On 24 September 2023, De Luis played for North Sydney in their 2023 NSW Cup grand final loss against South Sydney. On 29 September 2024, De Luis played for North Sydney in their NSW Cup Grand Final loss against Newtown.
