= Lee Te Maari =

New Zealand rugby league footballer

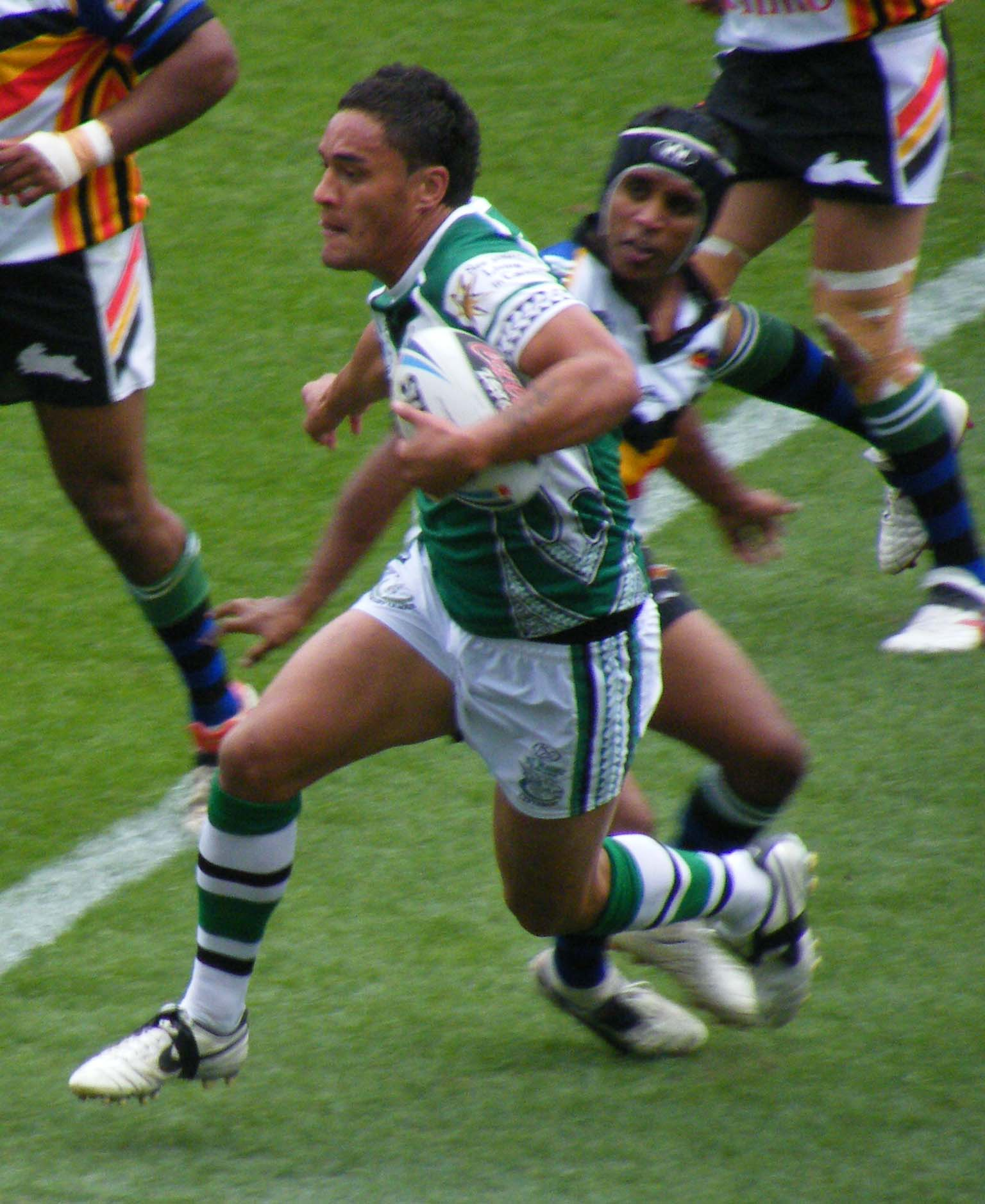

Personal information
- Full name: Lee Te Maari
- Born: 28 July 1985 (age 41) Tokoroa, New Zealand

Playing information
- Height: 1.88 m (6 ft 2 in)
- Weight: 100 kg (15 st 10 lb)
- Position: Second-row, Lock
Club
Years	Team	Pld	T	G	FG	P
2006	St. George Illawarra	2	0	0	0	0
2007–09	Canterbury Bulldogs	34	2	0	0	8
2010	Parramatta Eels	1	0	0	0	0
	Total	37	2	0	0	8
Representative
Years	Team	Pld	T	G	FG	P
2008	New Zealand Māori	1	0	0	0	0

Lee Te Maari (born 28 July 1985) is a former professional rugby league footballer who played in the 2000s and 2010s for the St. George Illawarra Dragons, Canterbury-Bankstown Bulldogs and Parramatta Eels. Te Maari primarily played in the second row.

== Early life ==
Te Maari played his junior rugby league for the Joondalup Giants in the Perth Rugby League.

== Playing career ==
Te Maari made his first grade debut for St. George in round 7 of the 2006 NRL season against the Sydney Roosters at the Sydney Football Stadium. In 2007, Te Maari joined Canterbury-Bankstown. He made eight appearances for Canterbury in the 2007 NRL season including the club's qualifying final loss against North Queensland.

In the 2008 NRL season, Te Maari made a career best 22 appearances as Canterbury finished bottom of the table and claimed the wooden spoon.

Te Maari was named in the New Zealand training squad for the 2008 Rugby League World Cup.

On 16 March 2010, Te Maari was dismissed by the Canterbury-Bankstown Bulldogs after repeated breaches of the Club’s Code of Conduct including numerous driving offences.

On 6 April 2010, Te Maari joined the Wentworthville Magpies and was selected to play in the Bundaberg Red Cup Team. Te Maari played one game for the Parramatta Eels in round 18 of the 2010 NRL season.
