= Daniel Holdsworth (rugby league) =

Australian rugby league footballer (born 1984)

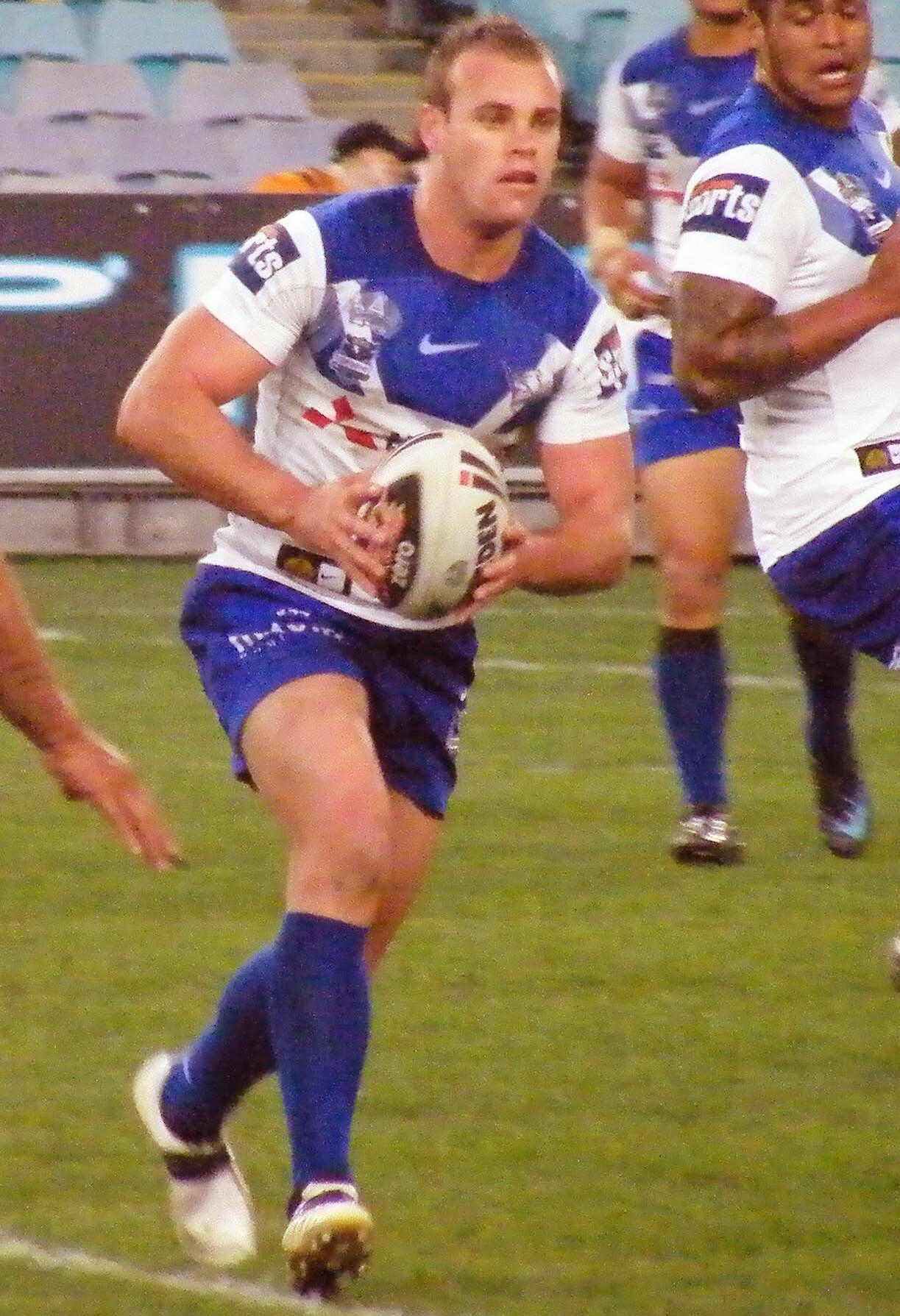

Personal information
- Full name: Daniel Holdsworth
- Born: 27 April 1984 (age 42) Tweed Heads, New South Wales, Australia

Playing information
- Height: 184 cm (6 ft 0 in)
- Weight: 96 kg (15 st 2 lb)
- Position: Five-eighth, Halfback
Club
Years	Team	Pld	T	G	FG	P
2004–05	St. George Illawarra	6	2	0	0	8
2006–09	Canterbury Bulldogs	70	13	5	2	64
2010–12	Salford City Reds	75	18	189	1	451
2013	Hull F.C.	22	2	30	2	70
2014	Cronulla Sharks	8	0	0	1	1
	Total	181	35	224	6	594
Representative
Years	Team	Pld	T	G	FG	P
2012	Exiles	1	0	0	0	0

Daniel Holdsworth (born 27 April 1984) is an Australian former professional rugby league five-eighth who played in the 2000s and 2010s.

== Background ==
Born in the northern New South Wales town, Tweed Heads, Holdsworth moved to Perth in Western Australia at an early age. In Perth, Holdsworth played all his junior rugby league for the North Beach Sea Eagles in the Perth Rugby League competition. Holdsworth represented Western Australia at the Under 15 and Under 18 age groups.

== Career ==
Holdsworth spent two years in the Penrith Panthers' lower grades, before signing with the St George Illawarra Dragons for the 2004 season. He made his NRL début while at the club and played 6 games in two seasons, before joining Canterbury, where he would play 70 games between 2006 and 2009.

Holdsworth then spent four seasons in the Super League, playing for the Salford City Reds and Hull FC. He represented the Exiles in 2012 and was described by English fullback Sam Tomkins as "very clever, powerful and an effective stand off".

In 2014, Holdsworth returned to the NRL, signing with the Cronulla-Sutherland Sharks. He played 8 games for Cronulla in his only season at the club as they finished last on the table and claimed the wooden spoon. This was mainly attributed to the club's high injury toll and the Cronulla-Sutherland Sharks supplements saga.

== Personal ==
In January 2014, Holdsworth's Caringbah home was robbed and memorabilia stolen, including signed jerseys from former teammates Sonny Bill Williams and Andrew Ryan.
