= Mandurah Storm =

Australian rugby league club

Mandurah Storm Rugby League Club is an Australian rugby league club based in the city of Mandurah, Western Australia. The club was founded in 2013. They currently compete in the NRLWA administered competition. They manage junior and senior teams.

== Emblem and Colours ==
The Mandurah Storm's primary colours are purple and yellow, but also a small portion of white is on their jersey. Their logo has been the same ever since being designed in 2013.
