= Jon Grieve =

Australian rugby league footballer

Personal information
- Full name: Jon Grieve
- Born: 29 September 1970 (age 54); Sydney, New South Wales, Australia

Playing information
- Position: Prop
Club
Years	Team	Pld	T	G	FG	P
1991–93	Manly Sea Eagles	19	0	0	0	0
1993–94	Widnes	6	0	0	0	0
1995–97	Western Reds	30	4	0	0	16
	Total	55	4	0	0	16
- Source: As of 23 January 2023

Jon Grieve is an Australian former professional rugby league footballer who played in the 1990s. He played for Manly-Warringah and the Western Reds in the NSWRL/ARL and Super League competitions. He also played for Widnes in England.

== Playing career ==
Grieve made his first grade debut for Manly in round 18 of the 1991 NSWRL season against Western Suburbs at Brookvale Oval. After having only played one match in the top grade, Grieve played in both finals games for Manly in the 1991 season against North Sydney and Canberra. Grieve played a further two years at Manly before signing with English side Widnes. In 1995, Grieve signed for the newly admitted Western Reds team where he played for three years including the 1997 Super League season when the club was renamed Perth Reds.
