= Curtis Rona =

Australia international dual code rugby footballer

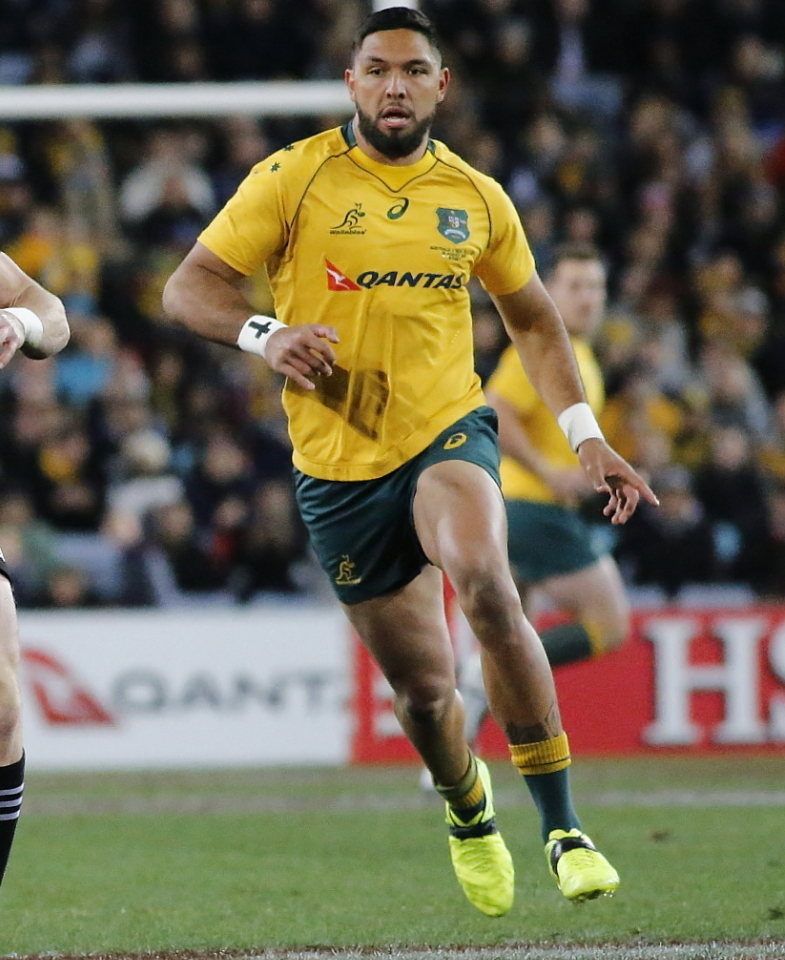

Personal information
- Full name: Curtis Renata Rona
- Born: 26 May 1992 (age 34) Waitara, New Zealand
- Height: 6 ft 4 in (1.94 m)
- Weight: 16 st 1 lb (102 kg)

Playing information

Rugby league
- Position: Wing, Centre
Club
| Years | Team | Pld | T | G | FG | P |
|---|---|---|---|---|---|---|
| 2014 | North Qld Cowboys | 7 | 6 | 0 | 0 | 24 |
| 2015–16 | Canterbury Bulldogs | 50 | 34 | 0 | 0 | 136 |
| | Total | 57 | 40 | 0 | 0 | 160 |
Representative
| Years | Team | Pld | T | G | FG | P |
| 2013 | Queensland Residents | 1 | 0 | 0 | 0 | 0 |

Rugby union
- Position: Wing, Centre
Club
| Years | Team | Pld | T | G | FG | P |
|---|---|---|---|---|---|---|
| 2017 | Western Force | 14 | 1 | 0 | 0 | 5 |
| 2018–2019 | NSW Waratahs | 31 | 13 | 0 | 0 | 65 |
| 2019–2022 | London Irish | 72 | 18 | 0 | 0 | 90 |
| 2022–2025 | Mitsubishi Dynaboars | 34 | 8 | 0 | 0 | 40 |
| | Total | 151 | 40 | 0 | 0 | 200 |
Representative
| Years | Team | Pld | T | G | FG | P |
| 2017 | Australia | 3 | 1 | 0 | 0 | 5 |
- Source: As of 6 January 2024

Curtis Rona (born 26 May 1992) is a former Australian international rugby union footballer who recently played for London Irish in the English Premiership. He now plays for Mitsubishi Heavy Industry Sagamihara Dynaboars.

He has previously played for the Western Force and NSW Waratahs in Super Rugby, as well as playing rugby league in the NRL for the North Queensland Cowboys and the Canterbury-Bankstown Bulldogs in the NRL.

== Background ==
Born in Waitara in the Taranaki Region of New Zealand, Rona is of Māori descent. Rona moved to Perth, Western Australia when he was eight. In Perth, Rona attended Aranmore Catholic College, where he played for their rugby union team and represented Western Australia at the Under 15, Under 16 and Schoolboy level. Rona played junior rugby league for the Joondalup Giants in the Perth Rugby League competition. He also played rugby union for the Wanneroo Districts juniors and was a member of the Western Force academy. In 2009, Rona made the full-time switch to rugby league and was a member of the Western Reds SG Ball team and represented the Western Australia Under-18s team. Later that year, Rona signed a three-year deal with the Sydney Roosters. From 2010 to 2012, Rona played for the Roosters Holden Cup (Under-20s) team playing 39 matches and scoring 23 tries. On 21 July 2012, Rona signed a two-year deal with the North Queensland Cowboys. Later that year, Rona represented the Junior Kiwis. In 2013, Rona joined the Cowboys first grade squad spending the 2013 season playing for the Cowboys feeder team, the Mackay Cutters, in the Queensland Cup. On 17 July 2013, Rona represented the Queensland Residents team.

== Playing career ==
=== 2014 ===
In 2014, Rona was a member of the Cowboys victorious Auckland Nines team, in which he scored two tries in the final against the Brisbane Broncos. In Round 7 of the 2014 NRL season Rona made his NRL debut against the Manly Sea Eagles on the wing, scoring a try in the Cowboys 26–21 loss at Central Coast Stadium. On 20 August 2014, Rona signed a 2-year contract with the Canterbury-Bankstown Bulldogs starting in 2015. Rona finished off his debut year in the NRL with him playing in 7 matches and scoring 6 tries for the North Queensland Cowboys in the 2014 NRL season.

=== 2015 ===
On 23 January 2015, Rona was named in the Bulldogs 2015 Auckland Nines squad. In Round 1 of the 2015 NRL season, Rona made his club debut for the Canterbury-Bankstown Bulldogs against the Penrith Panthers on the wing, scoring a try in the Bulldogs 24–18 loss at Penrith Stadium. He finished the 2015 season as the Bulldogs' highest try-scorer with 23 tries in 25 matches. On 24 September, Rona was selected in the New Zealand 24-man squad for the 2015 New Zealand rugby league tour of Great Britain. He was not selected for the first two matches against England, before returning home to see the birth of his daughter.

=== 2016 ===
On 12 August 2016, Curtis Rona agreed to a switch to Super Rugby to take up a two-year deal with the Western Force in Perth, as the Canterbury-Bankstown Bulldogs opted not to renew his contract. Rona finished his last season with the Bulldogs playing all 25 matches for the club, scoring 11 tries.

He was named in the New Zealand Māori squad for a match against the New Zealand Residents on 15 October 2016.

=== 2017 ===
In 2017 Rona played 14 matches for the Western Force, scoring 1 try. On 19 August, he made his international debut for Australia versus the All Blacks, starting on the wing and scoring a try in the 34–54 loss. He played two more matches for the Wallabies that year.

=== 2018 ===
Rona was signed by the New South Wales Waratahs in 2018 after the Western Force was removed from the Super Rugby competition.

=== 2019 ===
In 2019 Rona was the Waratahs' highest try scorer, scoring six tries. He signed a contract with the London Irish for the 2019-2020 Premiership Rugby season.

=== London Irish ===
Curtis joined Irish in 2019 and in 2020 scored the first try in the Brentford Community Stadium. He left the club with immediate effect in October 2022 to pursue an opportunity in Japan. It was confirmed that Rona has signed for Mitsubishi Dynaboars in the Japan Rugby League One competition ahead of the 2022–23 season.

== Personal life ==
Curtis married Jacinta in 2015. Curtis has a younger brother Daniel Rona that plays rugby for the Chiefs and Taranaki
