= Lark Hill Sports Complex =

Sports complex in Port Kennedy, Western Australia

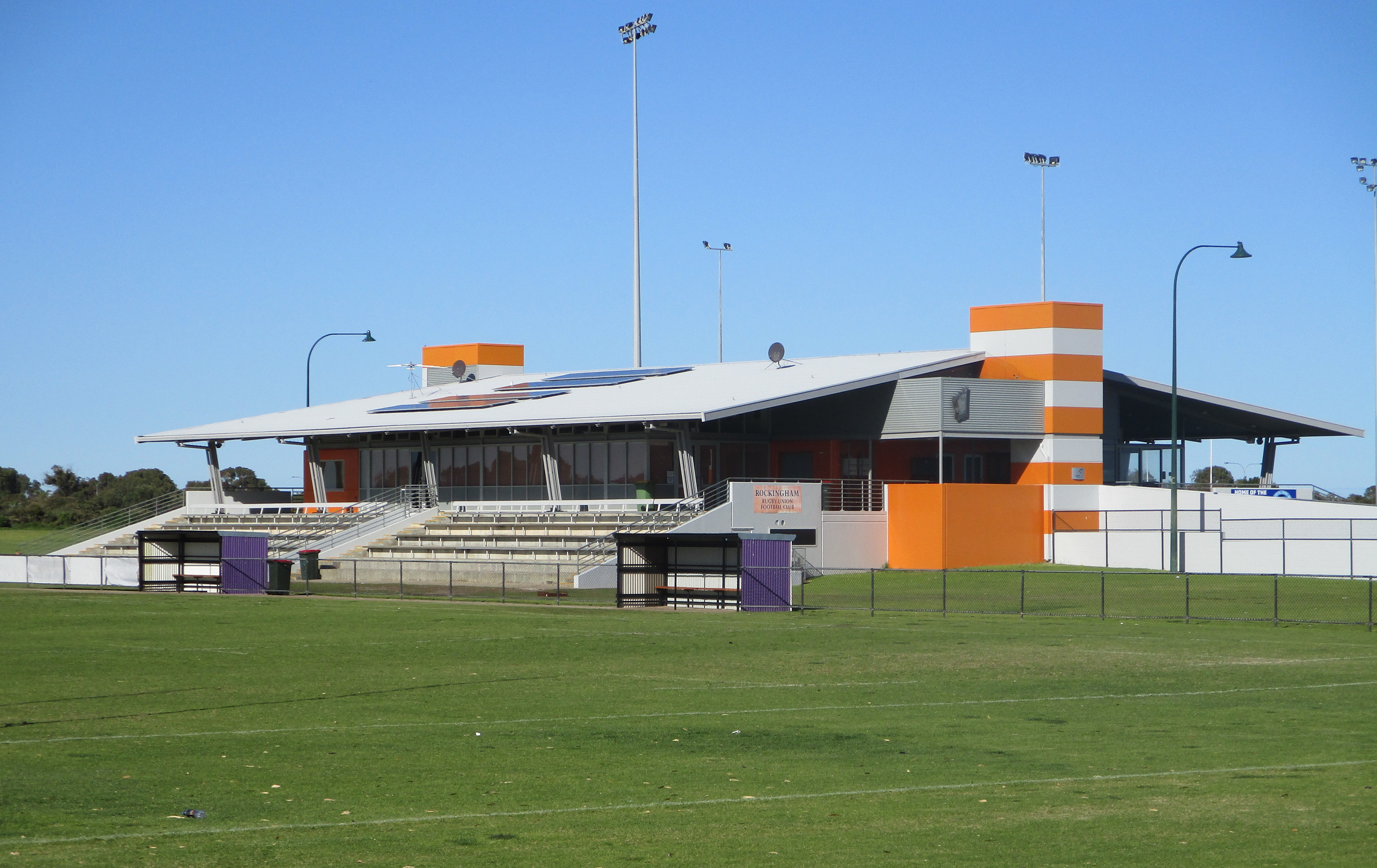
- Lark Hill grandstand and clubhouse
- Interactive map of Lark Hill Sports Complex
- Location: Warnbro Sound Avenue, Port Kennedy, Western Australia
- Coordinates: 32.39°S 115.76°E
- Owner: City of Rockingham
- Capacity: 3,000
- Surface: Grass

Construction
- Opened: 2008

Lark Hill Sports Complex is a multi-purpose sporting and recreation reserve at Lark Hill in Port Kennedy, Western Australia. It is located on 270 hectares of land approximately 60 km south of Perth, and is owned by the City of Rockingham. Stage one of the development costing $24 million was officially opened in 2008.

== Facilities ==
Lark Hill currently provides sporting facilities for rugby union, rugby league, touch football, soccer, softball and cricket. There is also a synthetic field hockey pitch. The complex has lighting suitable for hosting night time events on all sporting fields, multiple changing room facilities, and grandstands for spectator sports events.

It was one of the home grounds for the Perth Spirit team in the National Rugby Championship in 2014.

The second development stage of Lark Hill, to expand the Australian rules football facilities, was dropped from the Rockingham City 10-year business plan.

== Tenants ==
Sports groups with tenancies at the complex as of 2019 include:

- Cricket: Rockingham-Mandurah Mariners District Cricket Club
- Hockey: Rockingham Redbacks District Hockey Club
- Rugby league: Rockingham Coastal Sharks Rugby League Football Club
- Rugby union: Rockingham Rugby Union Football Club
- Soccer: Rockingham City Football Club
- Softball: Rockingham and Districts Softball Association

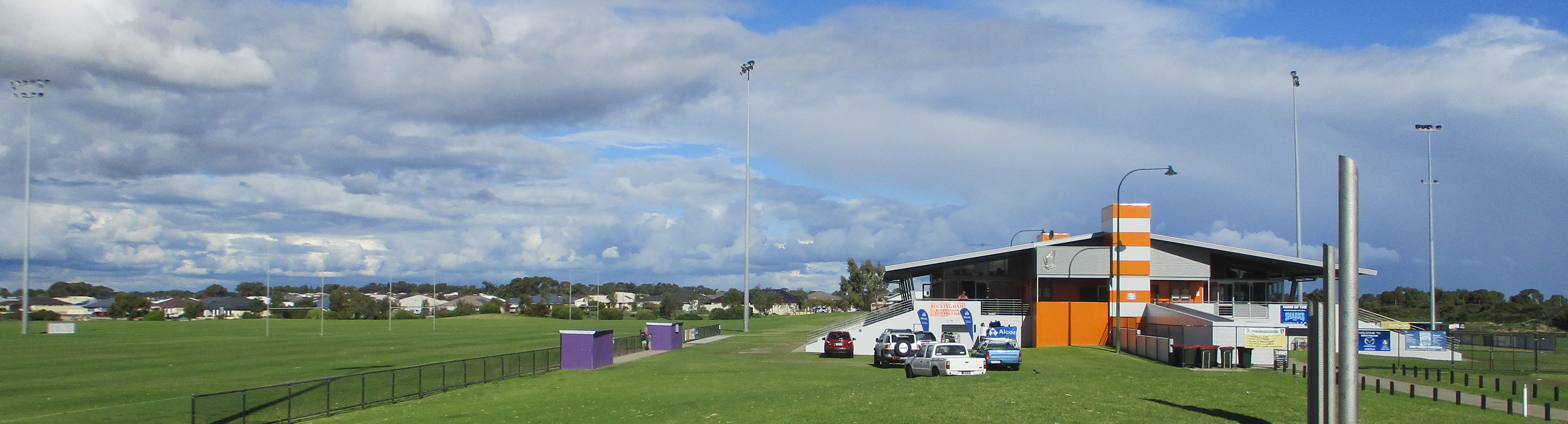
A view of the fields and clubhouse for rugby union and rugby league at Lark Hill Sports Complex.
