= Cory Paterson (rugby league) =

Australian rugby league footballer (born 1987)

Personal information
- Born: 14 July 1987 (age 39) Perth, Western Australia, Australia

Playing information
- Height: 195 cm (6 ft 5 in)
- Weight: 108 kg (17 st 0 lb)
- Position: Second-row
Club
Years	Team	Pld	T	G	FG	P
2007–11	Newcastle Knights	77	21	12	0	108
2011–12	North Qld Cowboys	10	4	0	0	16
2013	Hull Kingston Rovers	17	7	0	0	28
2014	Wests Tigers	9	1	2	0	8
2015	Salford Red Devils	21	10	9	0	58
2016–17	Leigh Centurions	41	22	0	0	88
2018	Toronto Wolfpack	18	11	0	0	44
2019	Leigh Centurions	10	4	1	0	18
	Total	203	80	24	0	368
Representative
Years	Team	Pld	T	G	FG	P
2010–12	Indigenous All Stars	3	0	0	0	0

Cory Paterson (born 14 July 1987) is an Australian former professional rugby league footballer who played as a second-row forward.

He previously played for the Newcastle Knights, North Queensland Cowboys and the Wests Tigers in the NRL and Hull Kingston Rovers, Leigh Centurions and the Salford Red Devils in the Super League. He played for the Toronto Wolfpack and Leigh in the Championship. He is also a professional boxer.

== Background ==
Paterson was born in Perth, Western Australia.

== Career ==
After playing junior rugby league in his home town of Perth, Western Australia, with South Perth Lions. Paterson then attended St Francis Xavier's College, Hamilton and in 2005 represented Australia at schoolboy level.

=== Newcastle ===
In 2007, Cory Paterson was promoted to train with the Newcastle Knights first team squad. He made his début in round 2 of that year in a win against the St. George Illawarra Dragons.

At the end of the 2008 season, Paterson was selected in the Prime Minister's XIII to play the Papua New Guinea national team in Port Moresby. He then toured the United States to visit a number of NFL clubs and trial for the Oakland Raiders as a punter. Paterson suffered depression during the 2009 season, causing him to miss some NRL matches, but returned to good form on the field in 2010 season, when he was selected for the Indigenous All Stars squad. In 2011, Paterson represented the Indigenous All Stars again, but midway through the season he was released from his contract by the Knights, a decision made by the club's incoming coach Wayne Bennett.

=== North Queensland ===
After being released by Newcastle, Paterson almost immediately signed for the North Queensland Cowboys, on a contract to play for the remainder of the 2011 NRL season and two additional seasons. Paterson was told by the Knights that he was not part of their long-term plans and was free to look elsewhere for 2011 and beyond. Paterson converted to Islam during the 2011 season, requiring him to fast during daylight hours in the month of August, co-inciding with the Cowboys run-in to the NRL finals series. Paterson is close to former professional rugby league players Anthony Mundine and Sonny Bill Williams, who both converted to Islam. He sought advice on fasting as a professional rugby league player from Hazem El-Masri, a devout Muslim who played over 300 first-grade matches for the Canterbury-Bankstown Bulldogs.

Paterson played 7 games for North Queensland in his first (half) season with the club, he was a member of their qualifying finals series team and scored 4 tries, including a double against the Wests Tigers.

Paterson started the 2012 season of playing representative football for the Indigenous All Stars against the NRL All Stars team, he then played in only 2 NRL matches for the North Queensland Cowboys after half the season had finished (starting in both, scoring one try) due to injuries and indifferent form.

=== Hull Kingston Rovers ===
On 27 June 2012, he signed a two-year deal with Super League side Hull Kingston Rovers.

Paterson coached the Hawaiian All-stars rugby league representative team in their match against Queensland Indigenous at Oahu, Hawaii on 27 October 2012. The match occurred during the 2012 Haida Gwaii earthquake, while tsunami alerts were issued for the islands.

While at Hull KR, Paterson formed a successful combination with Michael Dobson. However, it has been reported he has sought an early release from the club to be with his family in Australia.

=== West Tigers ===
It was announced in August 2013 that Paterson would join NRL club Wests Tigers on a one-year deal starting in 2014. At the end of the 2014 NRL season and after a total of 96 NRL appearances, Paterson announced his rugby league retirement to pursue his dream of a professional heavyweight boxing career.

=== Salford Red Devils ===
At the end of 2014, Paterson ended his brief rugby league retirement and agreed to a one-year deal to play for the Super League club Salford for the 2015 season. It saw him reunite with former teammate Michael Dobson. The deal includes the option of a second season at Salford.

=== Leigh Centurions ===
In September 2015, it was announced that Paterson would join Leigh Centurions for the 2016 RFL Championship. In January 2016, he was made one of two vice-captains for the Centurions.

=== Toronto Wolfpack ===
In December 2017 Paterson joined the Toronto Wolfpack on a two-year deal.

== Boxing ==
On 5 October 2012, Paterson made a successful boxing début against Anton Tuilotolava. On 12 November 2014, he won his second fight, on the undercard of the Mundine-Rabchenko fight, against Michael Lua Tama by 1st-round TKO. It was his first fight since retiring from rugby league to begin a career in boxing.

=== Record ===
2 wins (2 knockouts, 0 decision), 0 loss, 0 draws
Res.	Record	Opponent	Type	Round	Date	Location
Win	2–0	Michael Tamalemai	TKO	1 (4)	2014-11-12	Hisense Arena, Melbourne, Victoria, Australia
Win	1–0	Anton Tuilotolava	KO	2 (4)	2012-10-05	Newcastle Panthers Club, Newcastle, New South Wales, Australia
