= 1998 NRL season =

Rugby league competition

1998 National Rugby League
- Duration: March 13 – September 27, 1998
- Teams: 20
- Premiers: Brisbane (4th title)
- Minor premiers: Brisbane (3rd title)
- Matches played: 253
- Points scored: 10,131
- Average attendance: 11,612
- Total attendance: 2,937,741
- Top points scorer: Ivan Cleary (284)
- Wooden spoon: Western Suburbs Magpies (16th spoon)
- Dally M Medal: Andrew Johns
- Top try-scorer: Darren Smith (23)

The 1998 NRL season was the 91st season of professional rugby league football in Australia, and the inaugural season of the newly formed National Rugby League (NRL). After the 1997 season, in which the Australian Rugby League and Super League organisations ran separate competitions parallel to each other, they joined to create a reunited competition in the NRL. The first professional rugby league club to be based in Victoria, the Melbourne Storm was introduced into the League, and with the closure of the Hunter Mariners, Western Reds/Perth Reds and South Queensland Crushers, twenty teams competed for the premiership, which culminated in the 1998 NRL Grand Final between Brisbane and Canterbury-Bankstown. It was also the final season for the Illawarra Steelers and the St. George Dragons as their own clubs prior to their merger into the St. George-Illawarra Dragons for the 1999 NRL season

== Pre-season ==
The National Rugby League was formed after an agreement was reached between the two rivaling competitions from 1997, the Australian Rugby League and the Super League. In December 1997, the two parties formed a joint board to run the new Australian rugby league club competition. The vast majority of the 22 clubs that contested in 1997 across the split competitions also contested the first season of the National Rugby League, with the exception of the Hunter Mariners, the Western Reds and South Queensland.

The National Rugby League imposed a $3M salary cap on each of the clubs.

=== Advertising ===
Super League's ad agency VCD in Sydney successfully kept the account post-reunification. The 1998 ad featured the song "Tubthumping" by Chumbawamba with its theme of rising against adversity:

I get knocked down! But I get up again; you're never gonna keep me down.

There was no visual performance of the song in the ad which returned to the standard rugby league imagery of big hits and crunching tackles to accompany the track.

== Teams ==
The closure of the Hunter Mariners, Western/Perth Reds and South Queensland Crushers, and the introduction of the Melbourne Storm meant that a total of twenty clubs contested the 1998 Premiership. Eleven of these clubs were from Sydney, but an agreement between the Australian Rugby League and Super League meant that many of these clubs were in danger of being cut from the competition by the 2000 season when, it was decided, only 14 clubs would be invited to contest the premiership.

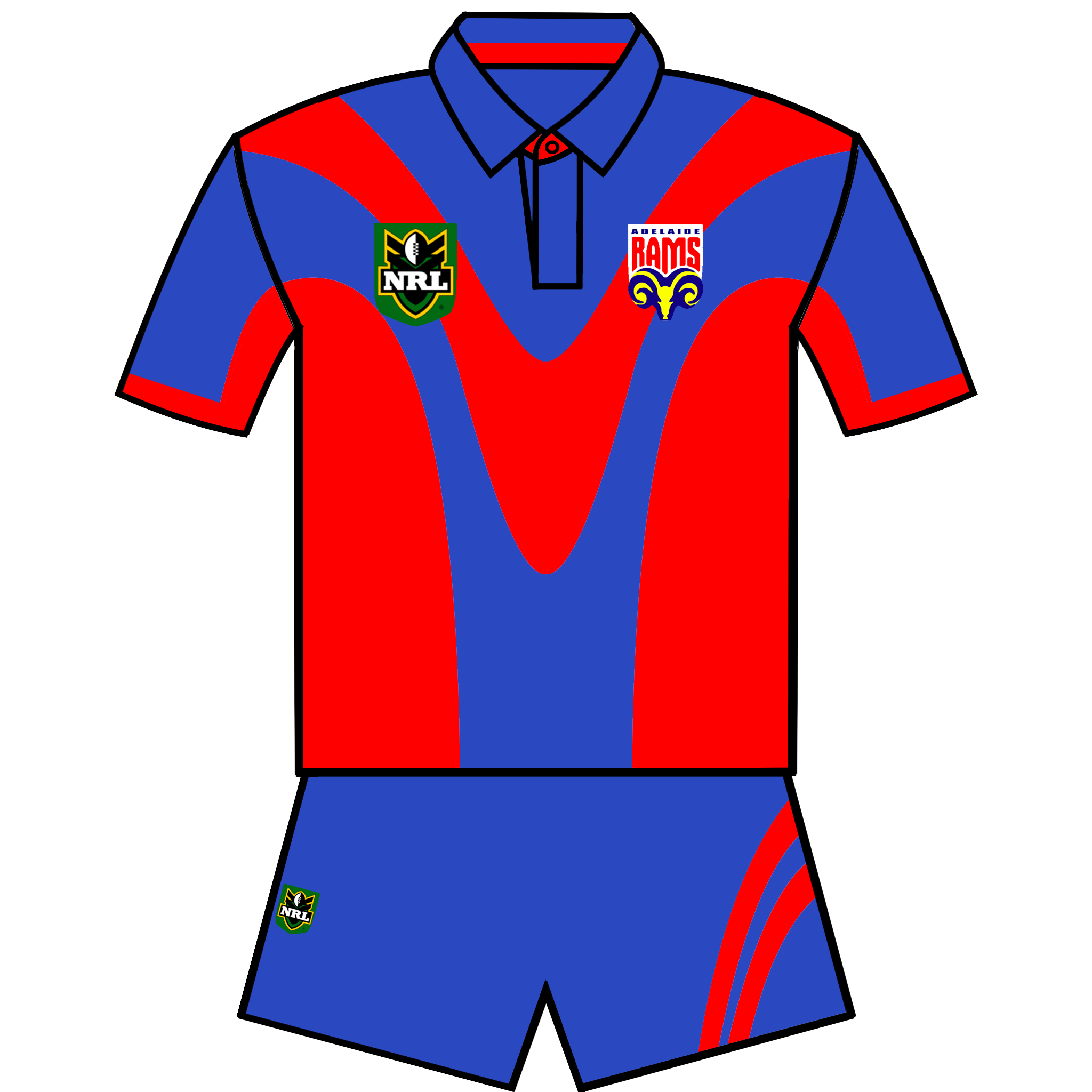
Adelaide Rams 2nd & final season Ground: Adelaide Oval → Hindmarsh Stadium; Coach: Rod Reddy → Dean Lance; Captain: Kerrod Walters

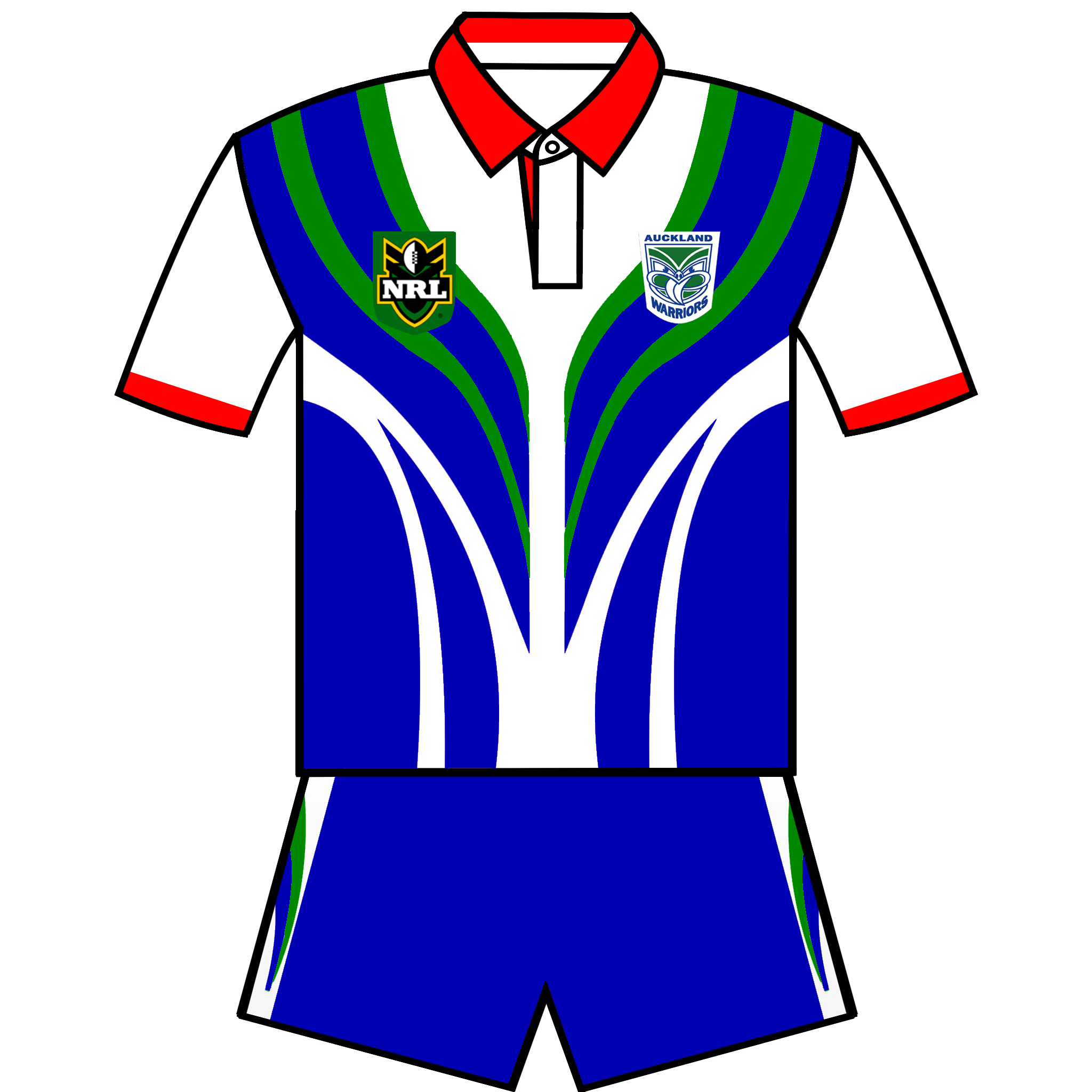
Auckland Warriors 4th season Ground: Ericsson Stadium; Coach: Frank Endacott; Captain: Matthew Ridge

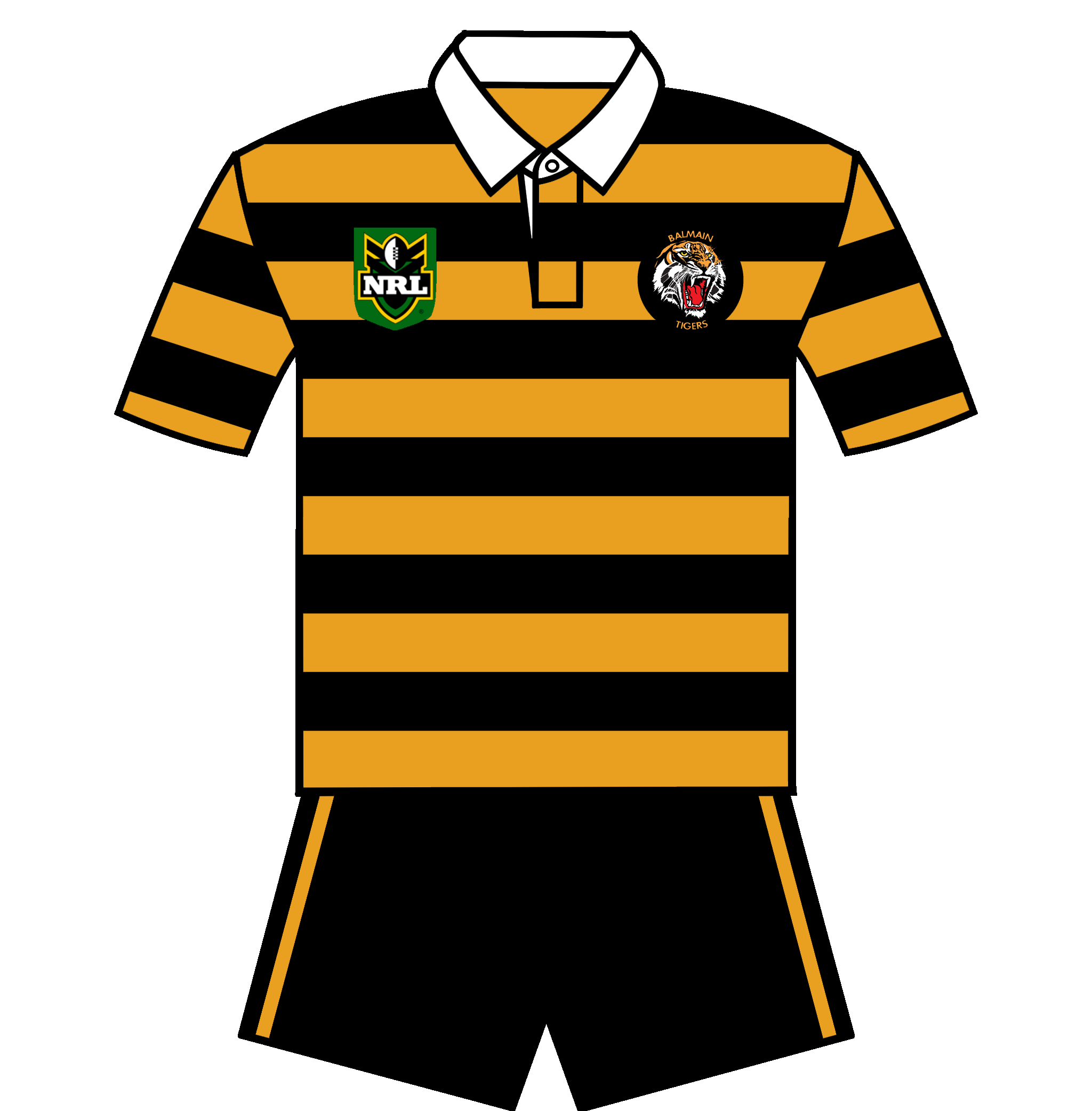
Balmain Tigers 91st season Ground: Leichhardt Oval; Coach: Wayne Pearce; Captain: Darren Senter

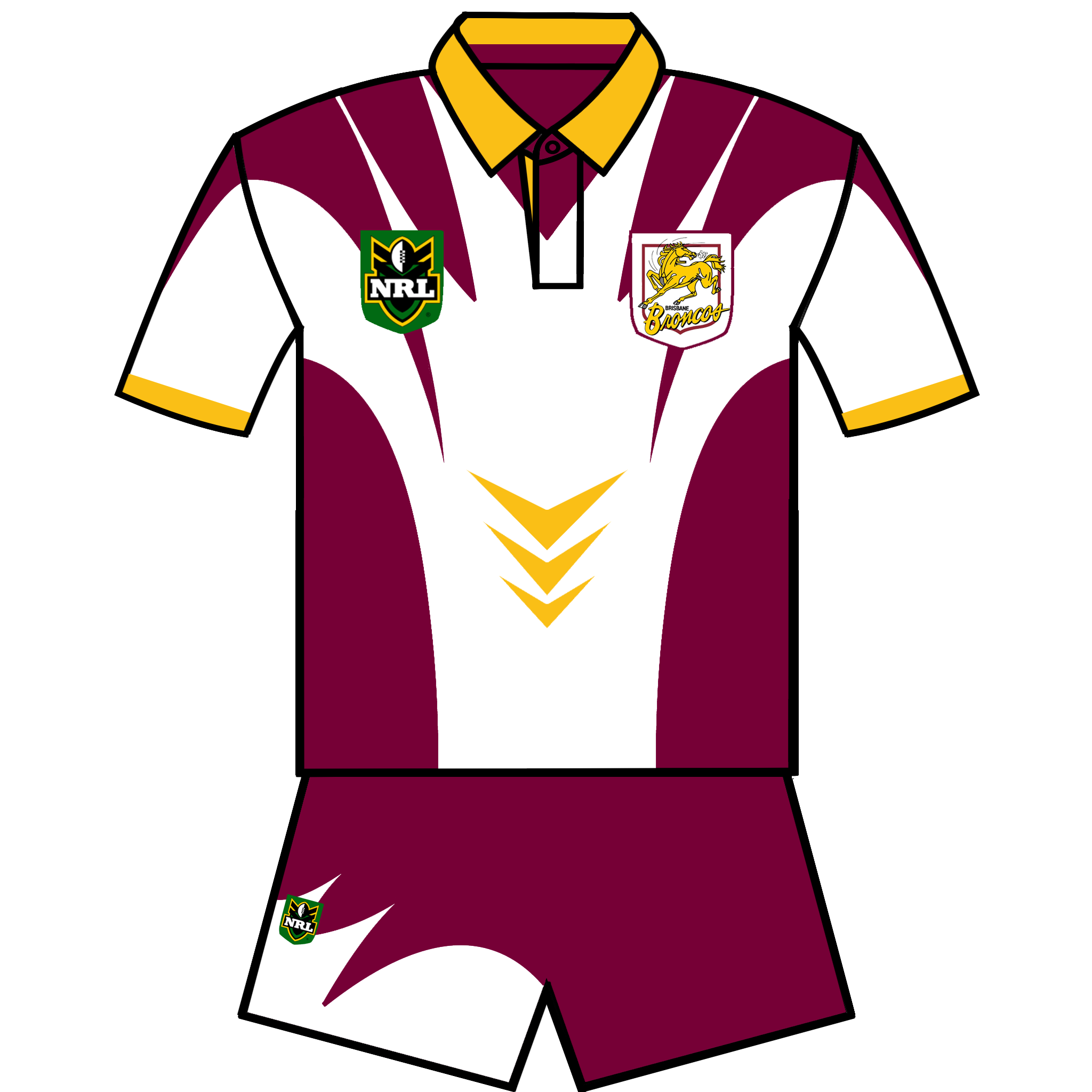
Brisbane Broncos 11th season Ground: ANZ Stadium; Coach: Wayne Bennett; Captain: Allan Langer

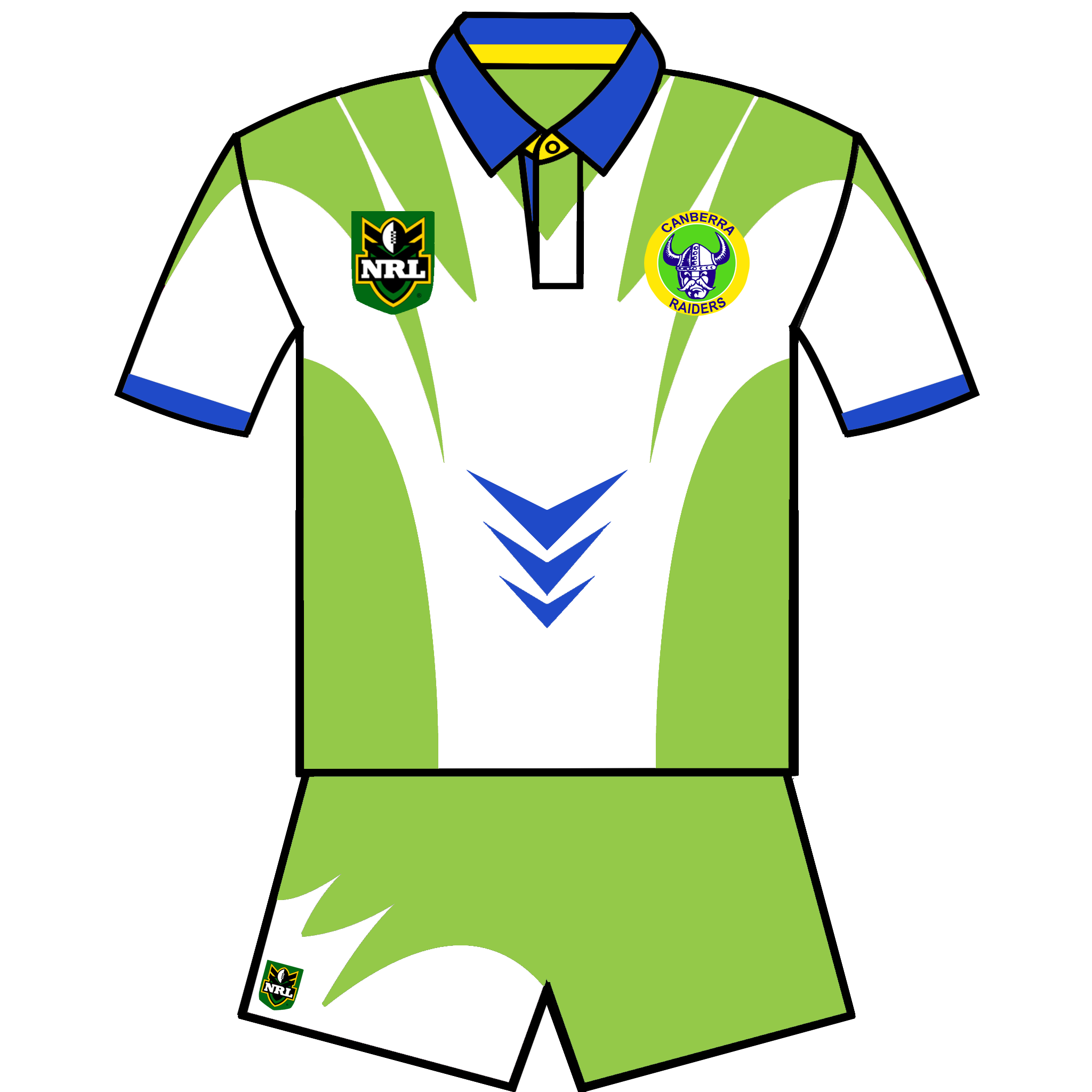
Canberra Raiders 17th season Ground: Bruce Stadium; Coach: Mal Meninga; Captain: Laurie Daley

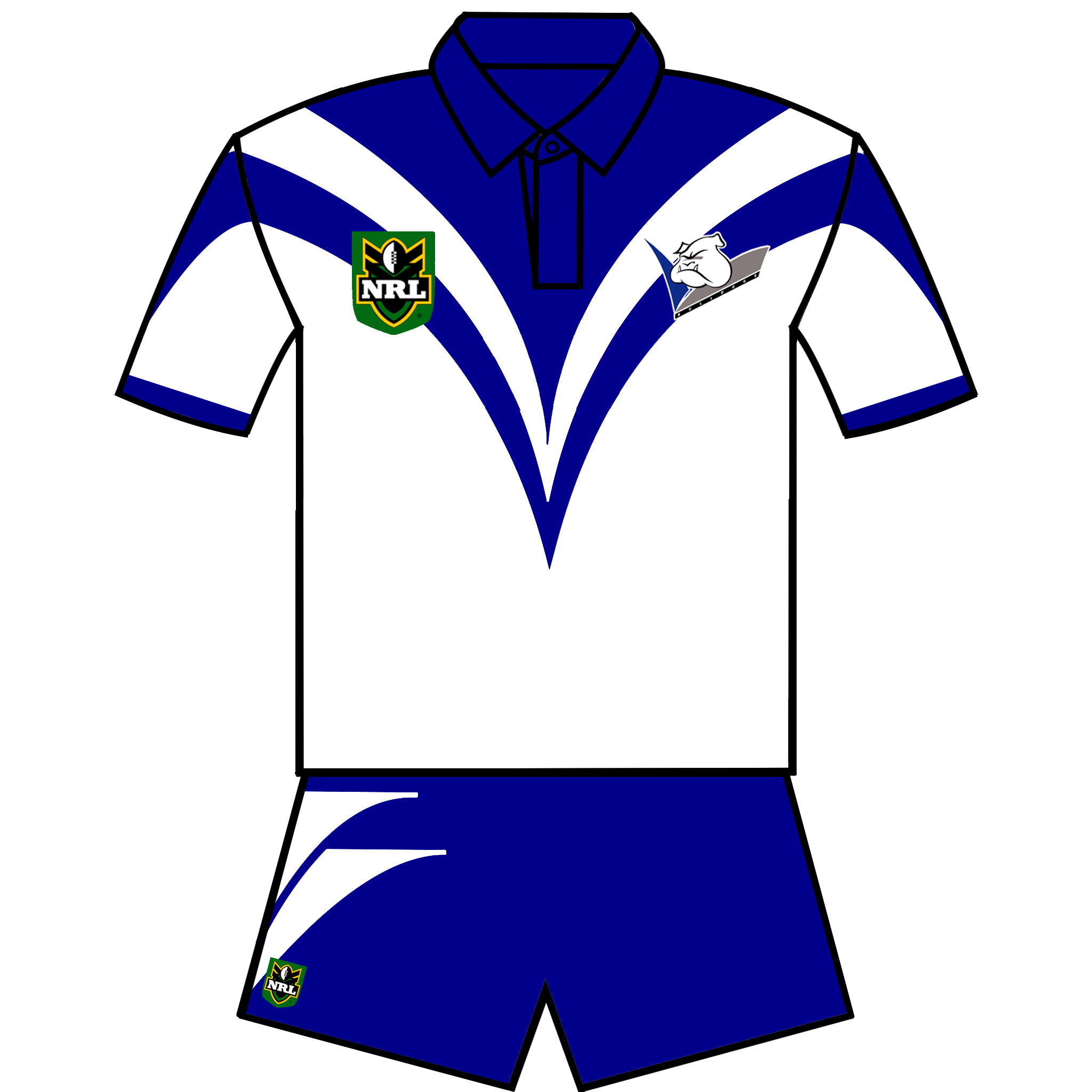
Canterbury Bulldogs 64th season Ground: Belmore Oval; Coach: Steve Folkes; Captain: Simon Gillies→Darren Britt

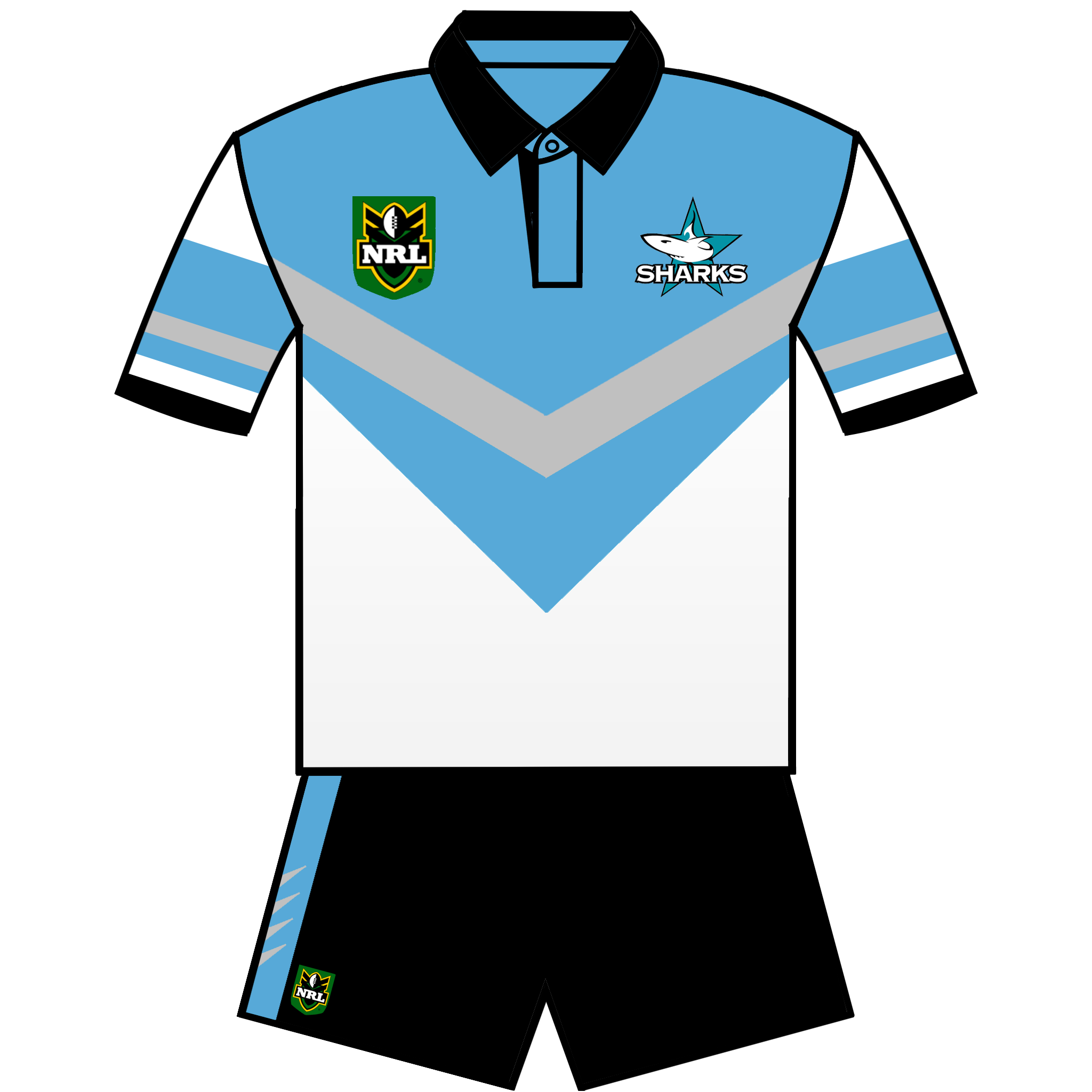
Cronulla Sharks 32nd season Ground: Shark Park; Coach: John Lang; Captain: Andrew Ettingshausen

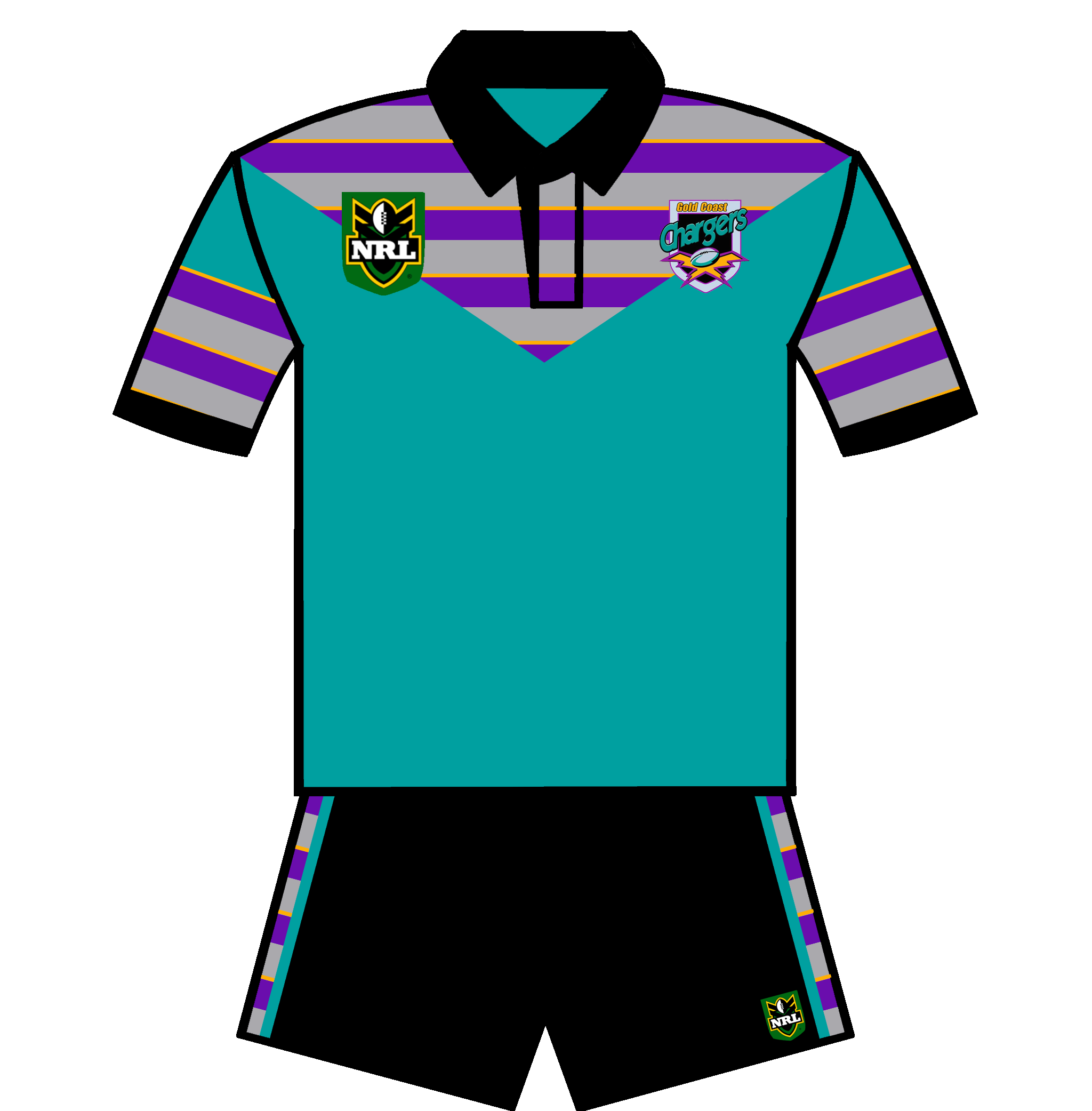
Gold Coast Chargers 11th & final season Ground: Carrara Stadium; Coach: Phil Economidis; Captain: Jamie Goddard

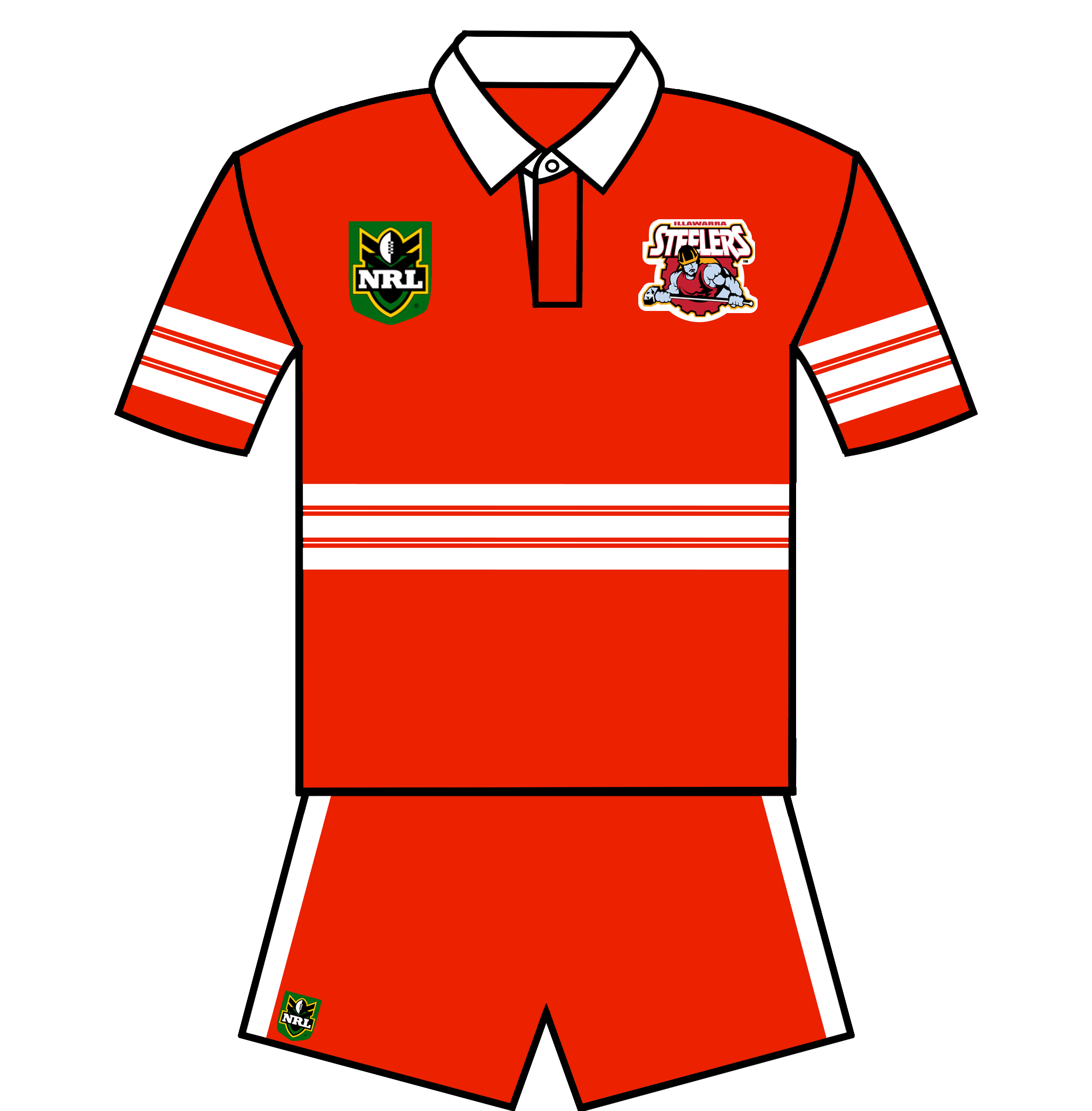
Illawarra Steelers 17th & final season Ground: WIN Stadium; Coach: Andrew Farrar; Captain: Paul McGregor

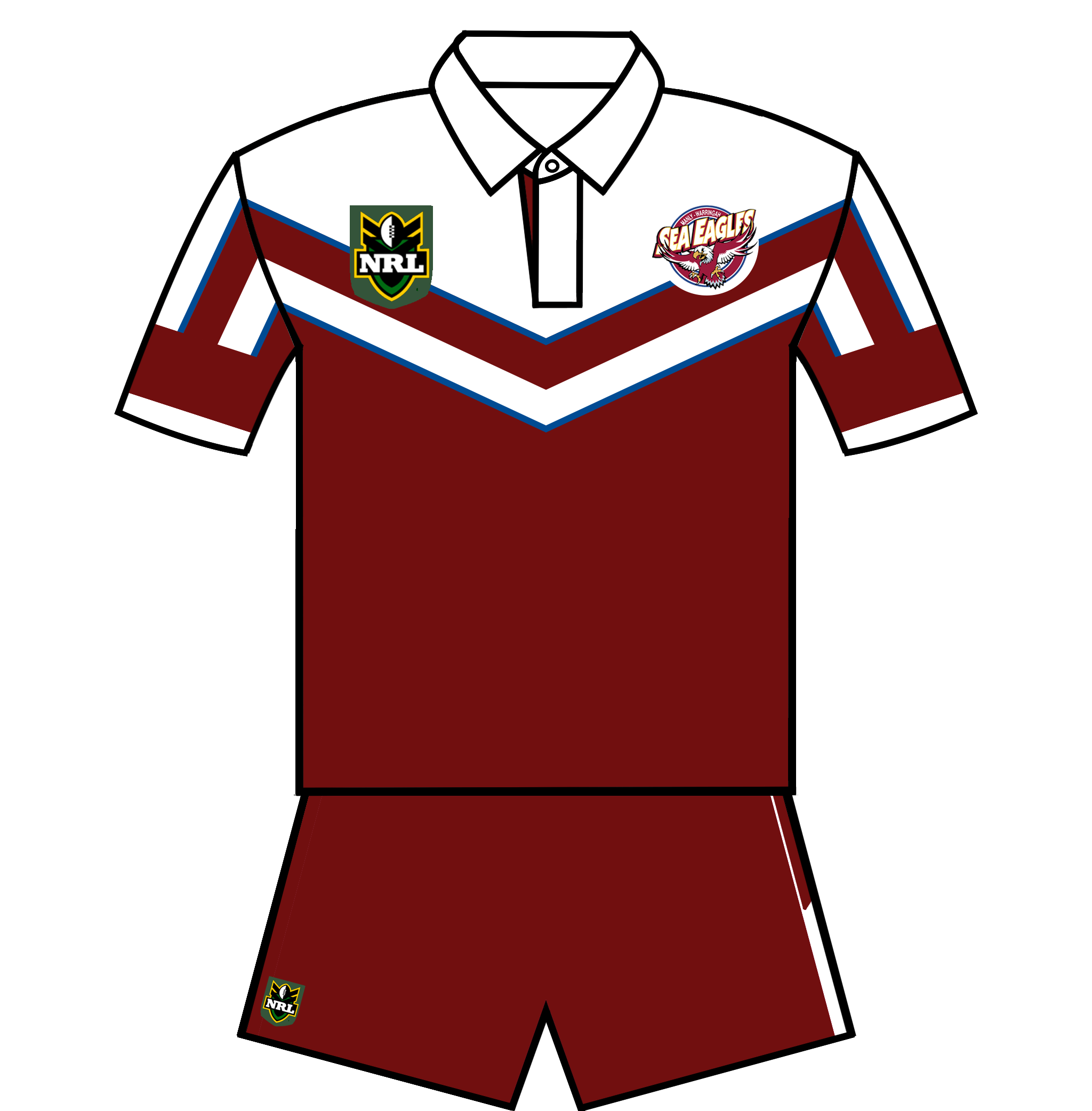
Manly Sea Eagles 52nd season Ground: Brookvale Oval; Coach: Bob Fulton; Captain: Geoff Toovey

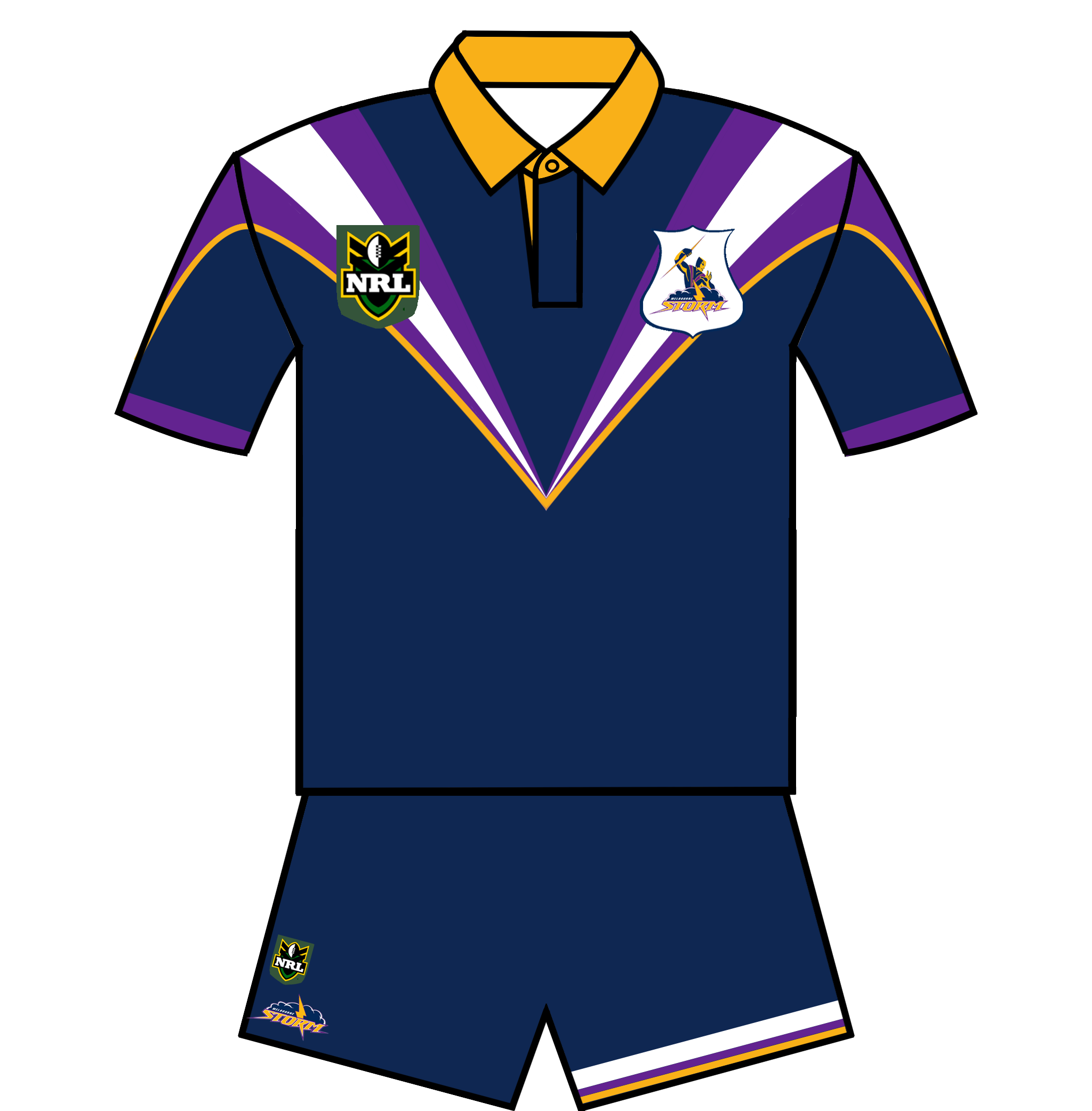
Melbourne Storm 1st season Ground: Olympic Park Stadium; Coach: Chris Anderson; Captain: Glenn Lazarus

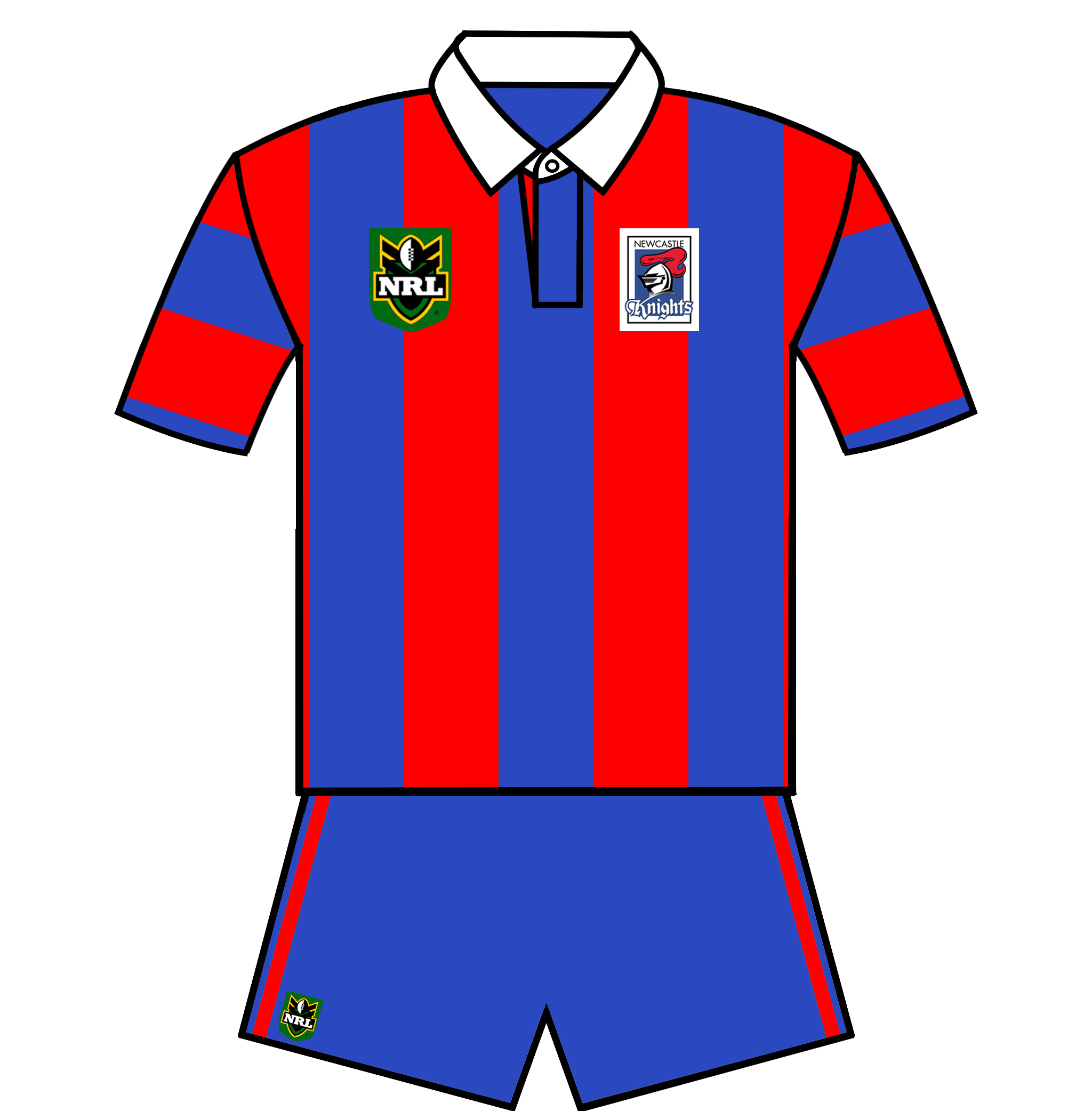
Newcastle Knights 11th season Ground: Marathon Stadium; Coach: Mal Reilly; Captain: Paul Harragon

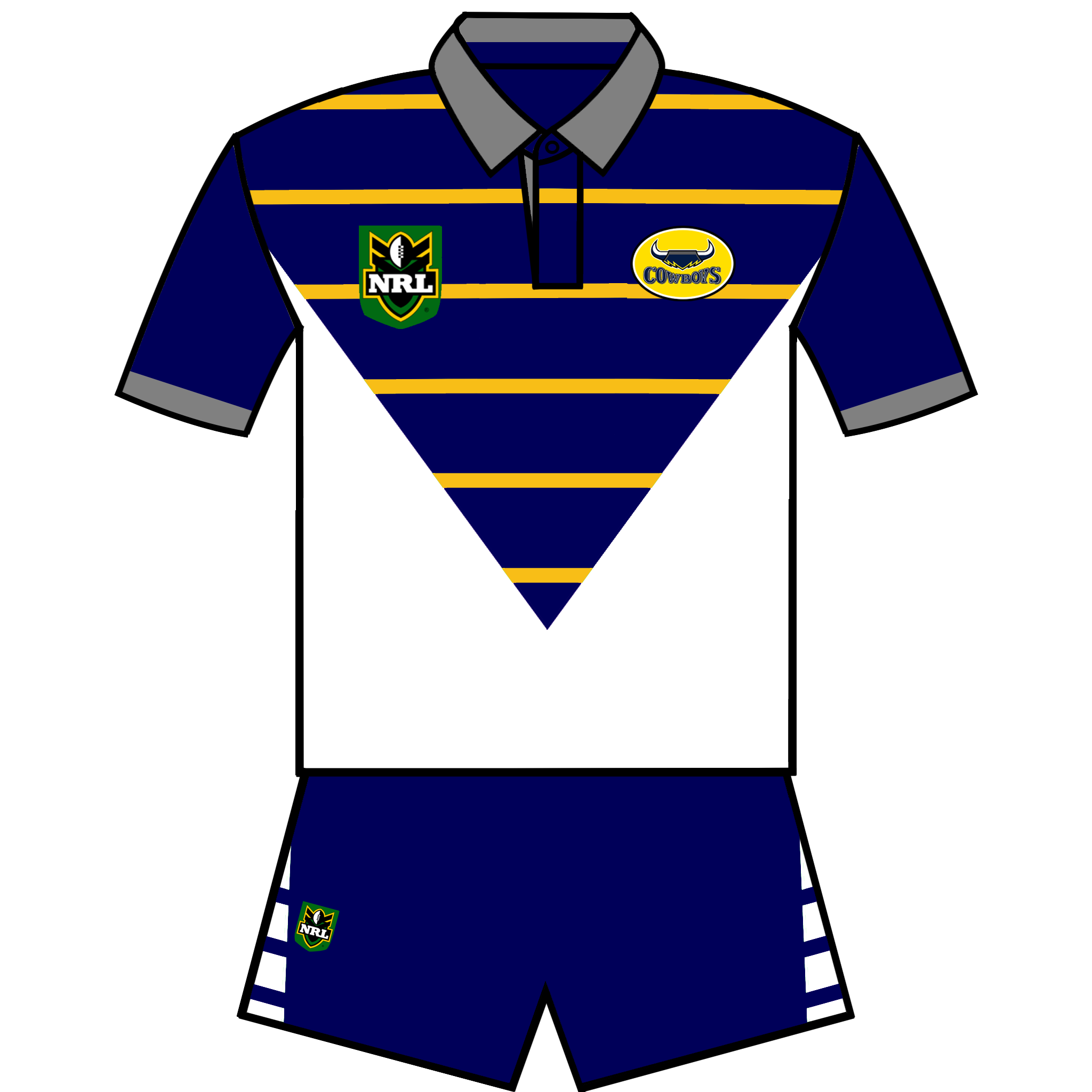
North Qld. Cowboys 4th season Ground: Stockland Stadium; Coach: Tim Sheens; Captain: Ian Roberts & John Lomax

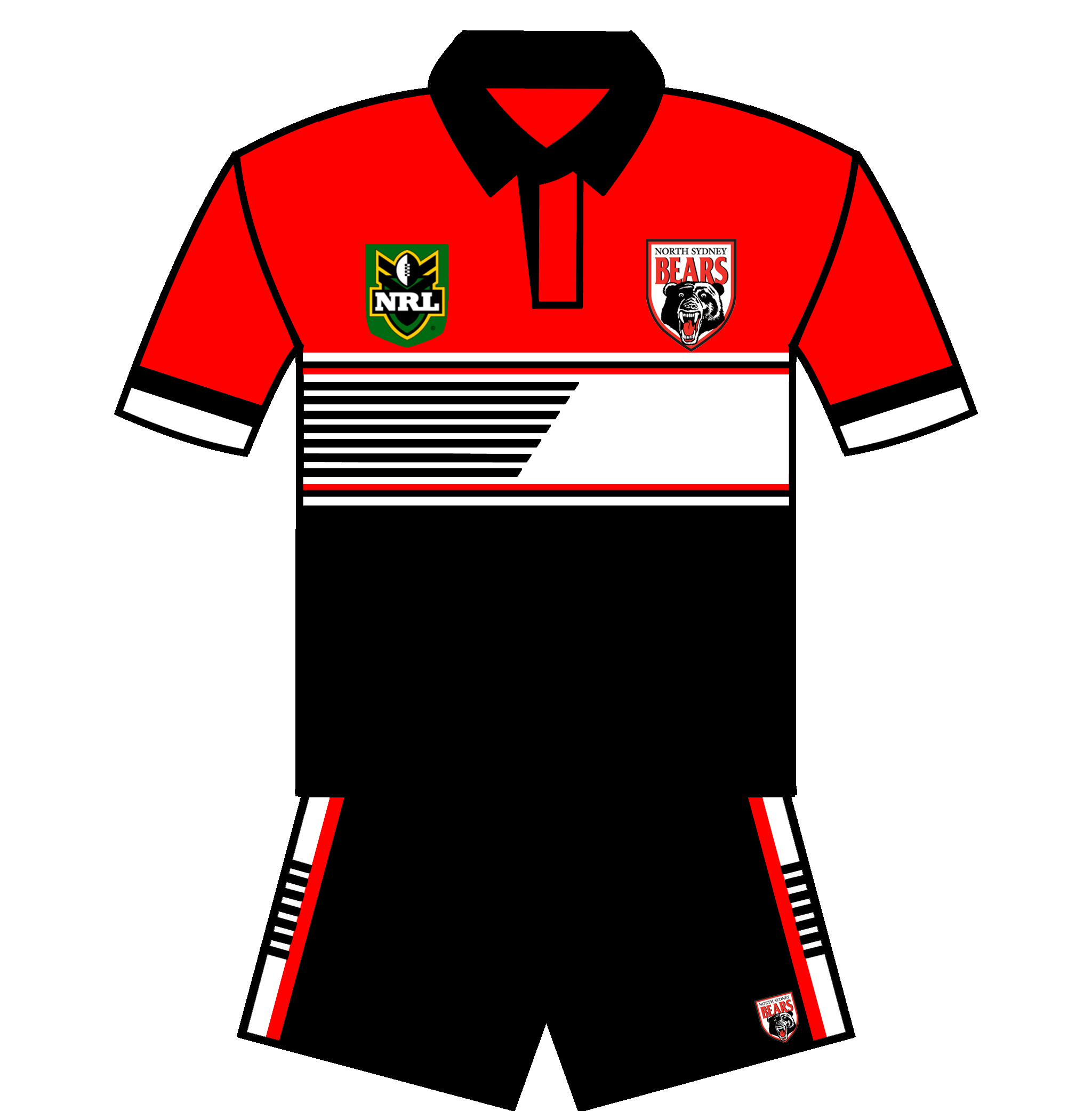
North Sydney Bears 91st season Ground: North Sydney Oval; Coach: Peter Louis; Captain: Jason Taylor

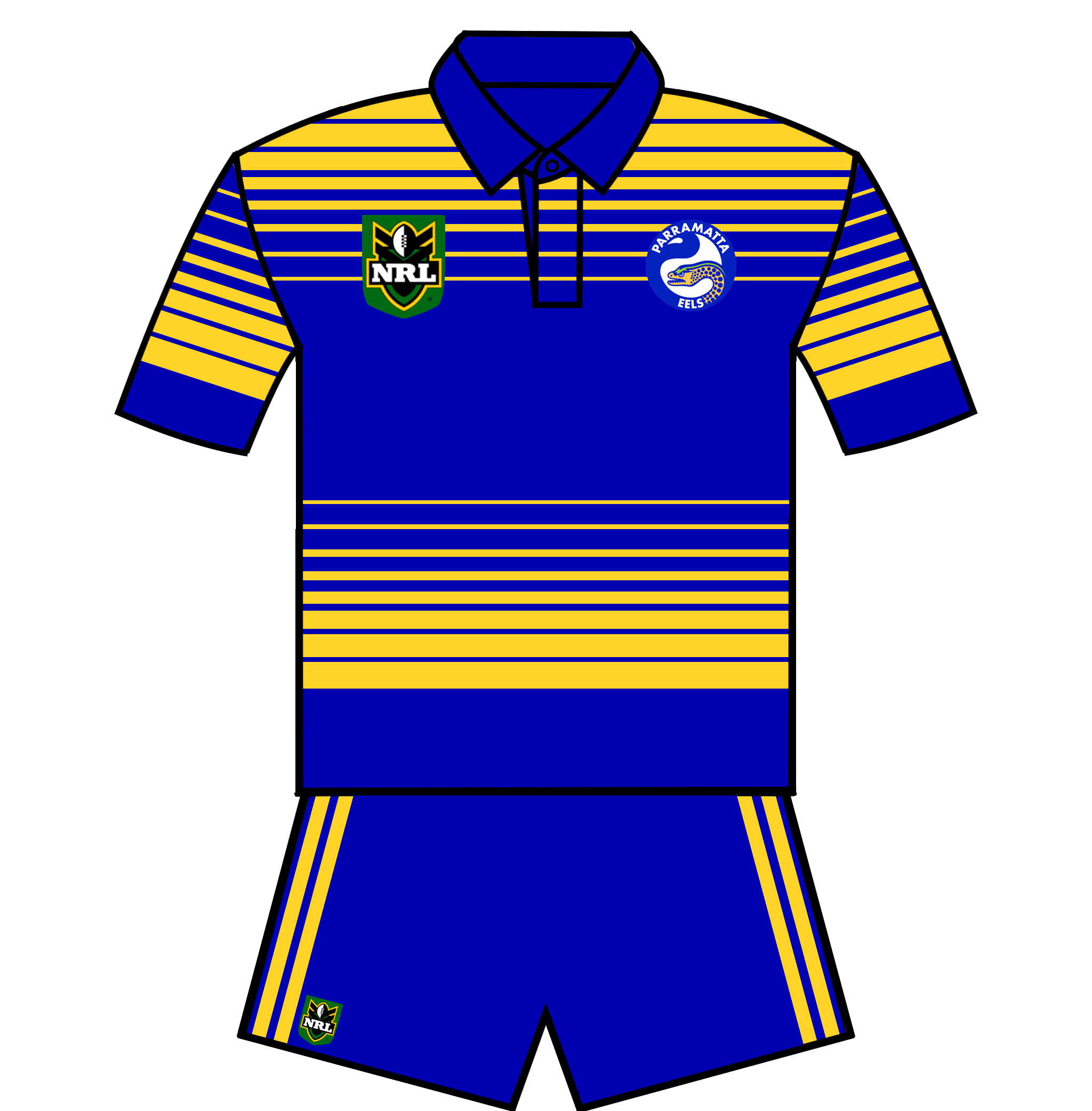
Parramatta Eels 52nd season Ground: Parramatta Stadium; Coach: Brian Smith; Captain: Dean Pay

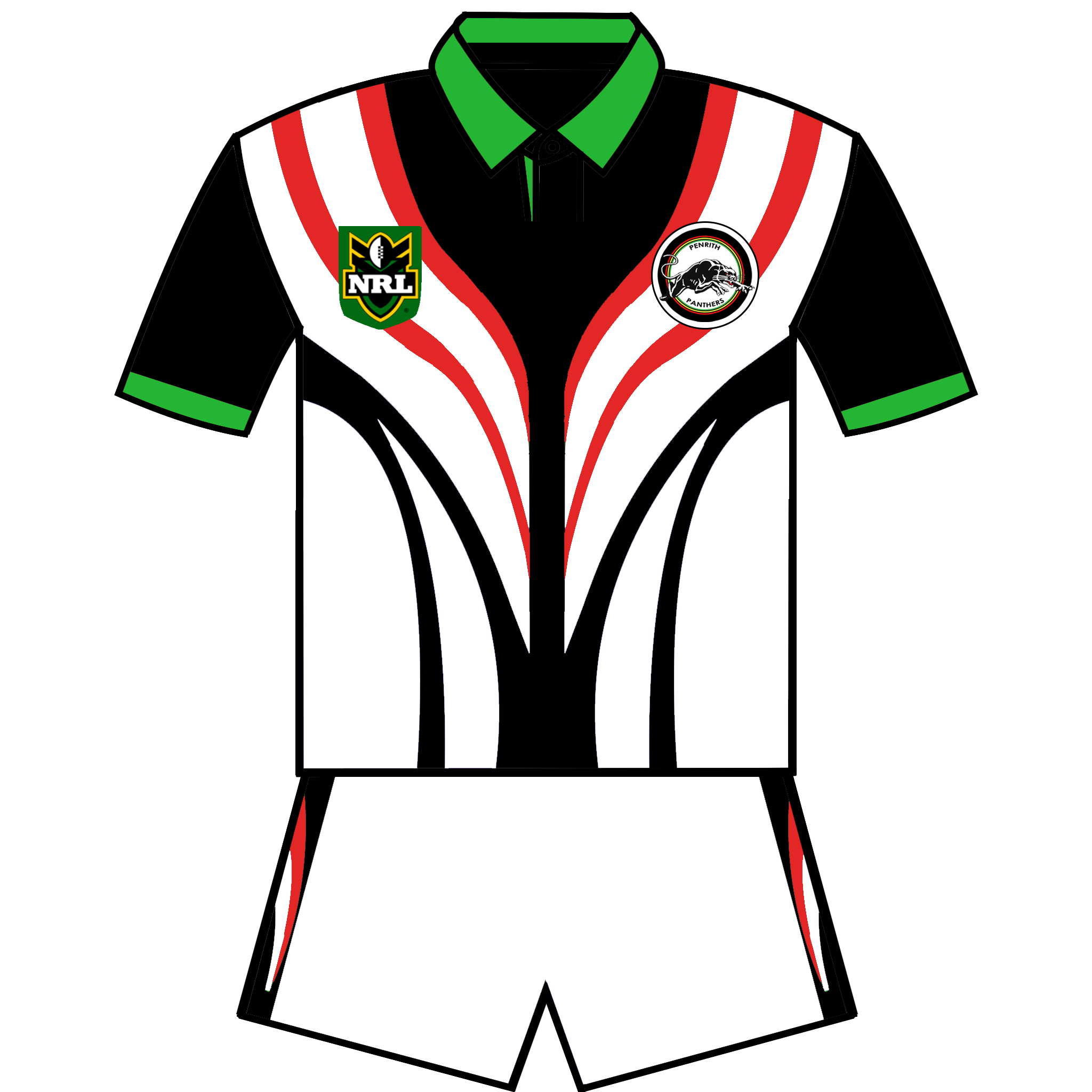
Penrith Panthers 32nd season Ground: Penrith Stadium; Coach: Royce Simmons; Captain: Steve Carter

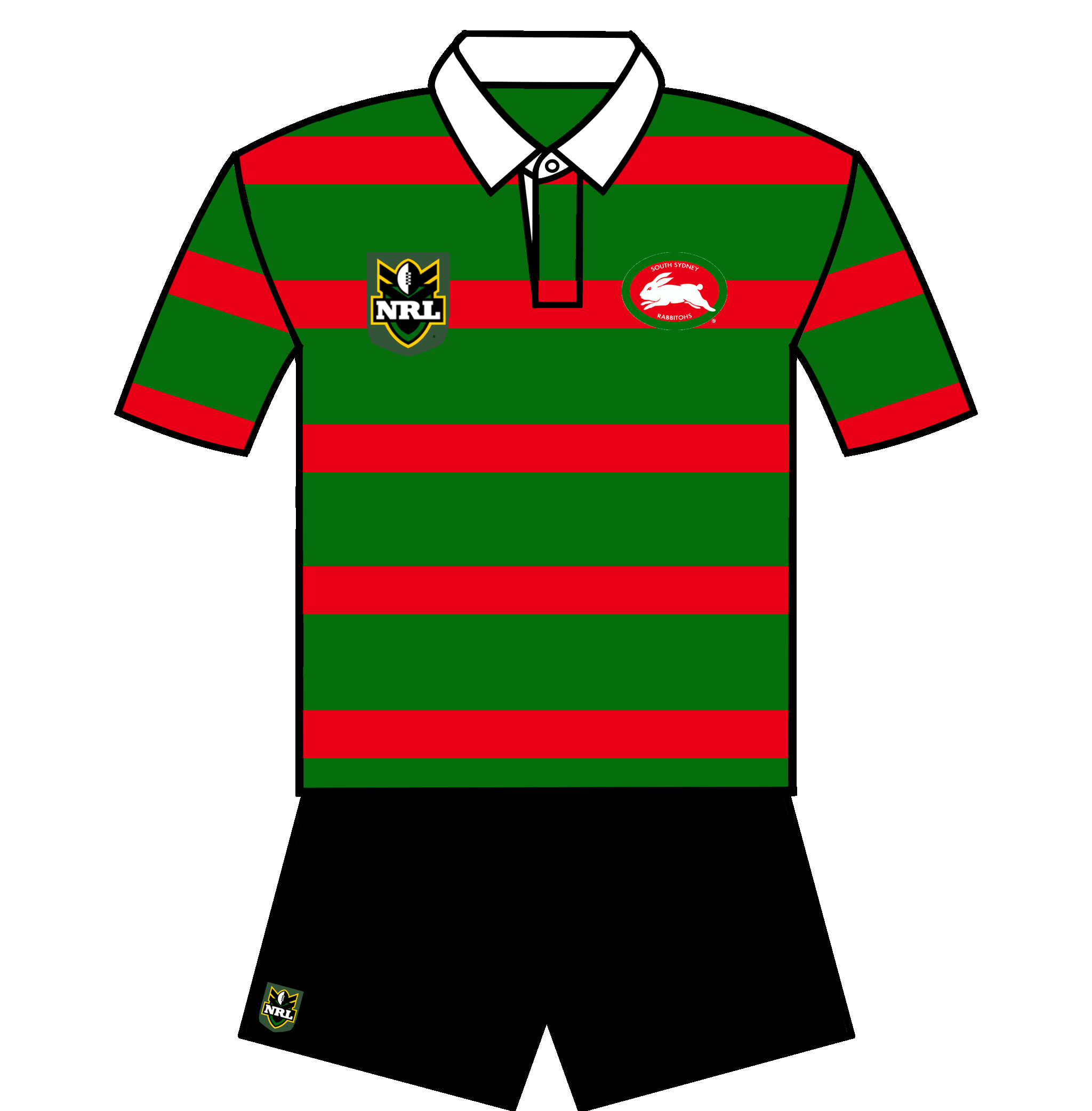
South Sydney Rabbitohs 91st season Ground: Sydney Football Stadium; Coach: Steve Martin → Craig Coleman; Captain: Sean Garlick

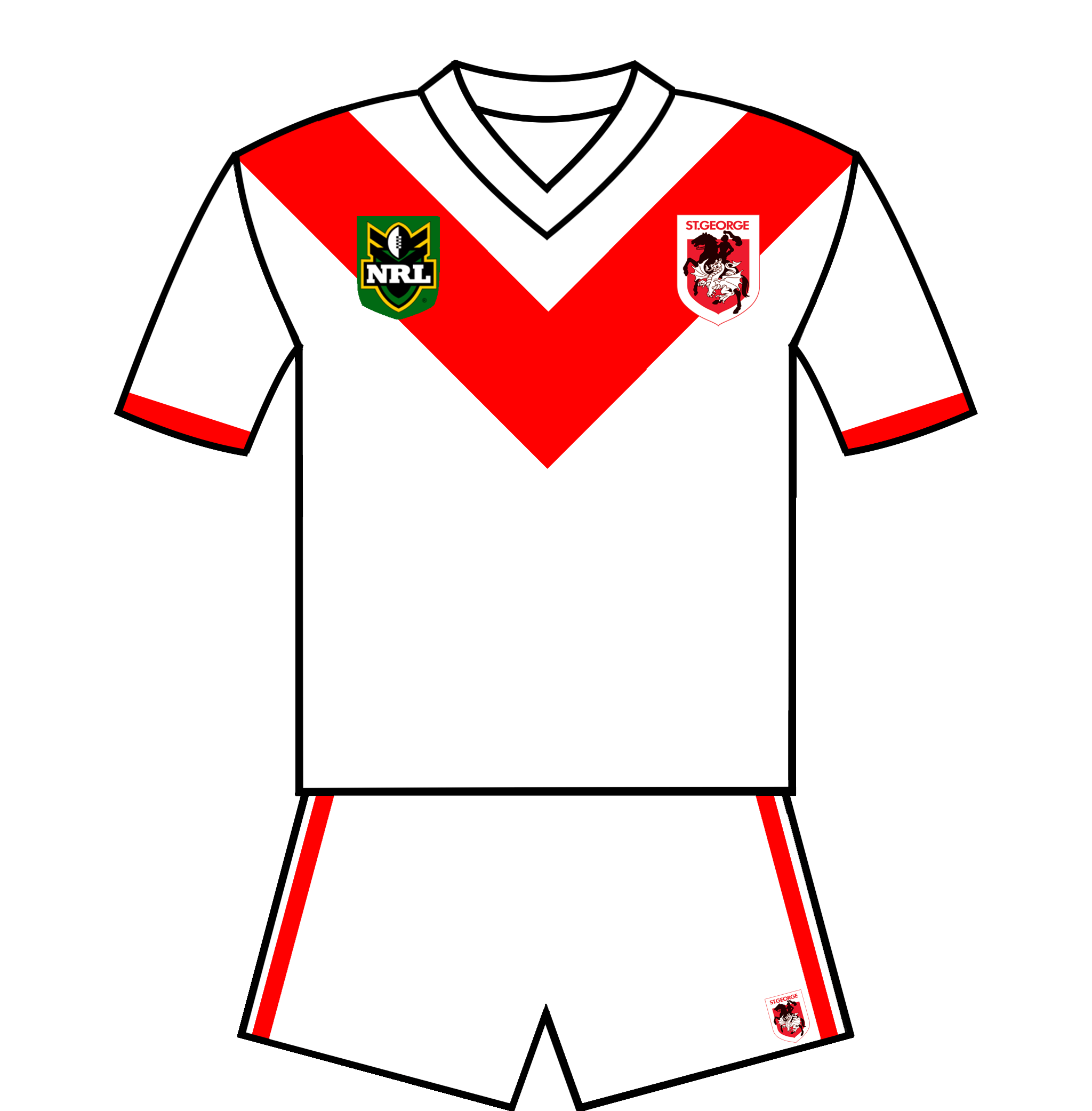
St. George Dragons 78th & final season Ground: Kogarah Oval; Coach: David Waite; Captain: Mark Coyne

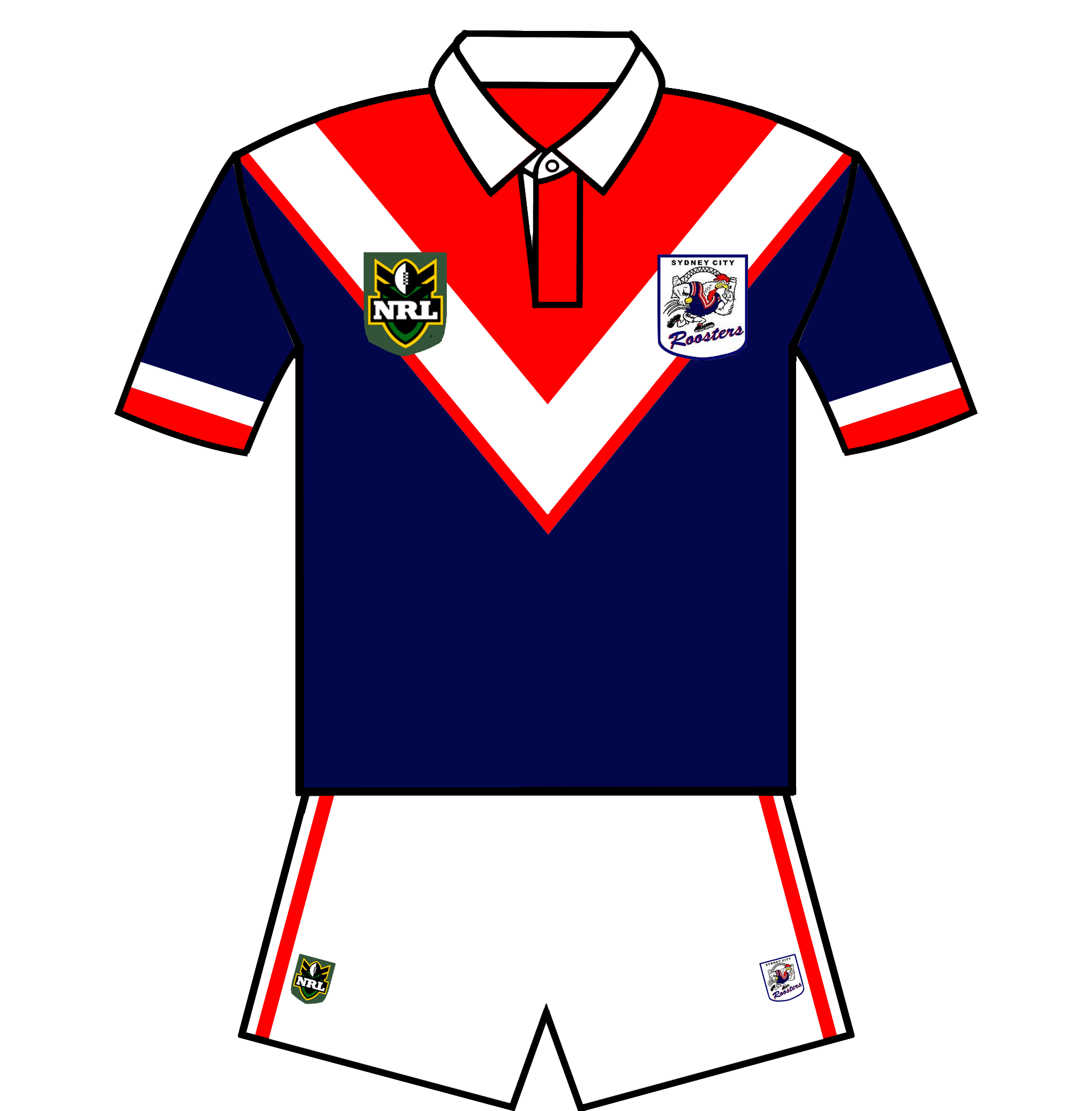
Sydney City Roosters (East. Suburbs Roostes) 91st season Ground: Sydney Football Stadium; Coach: Phil Gould; Captain: Brad Fittler

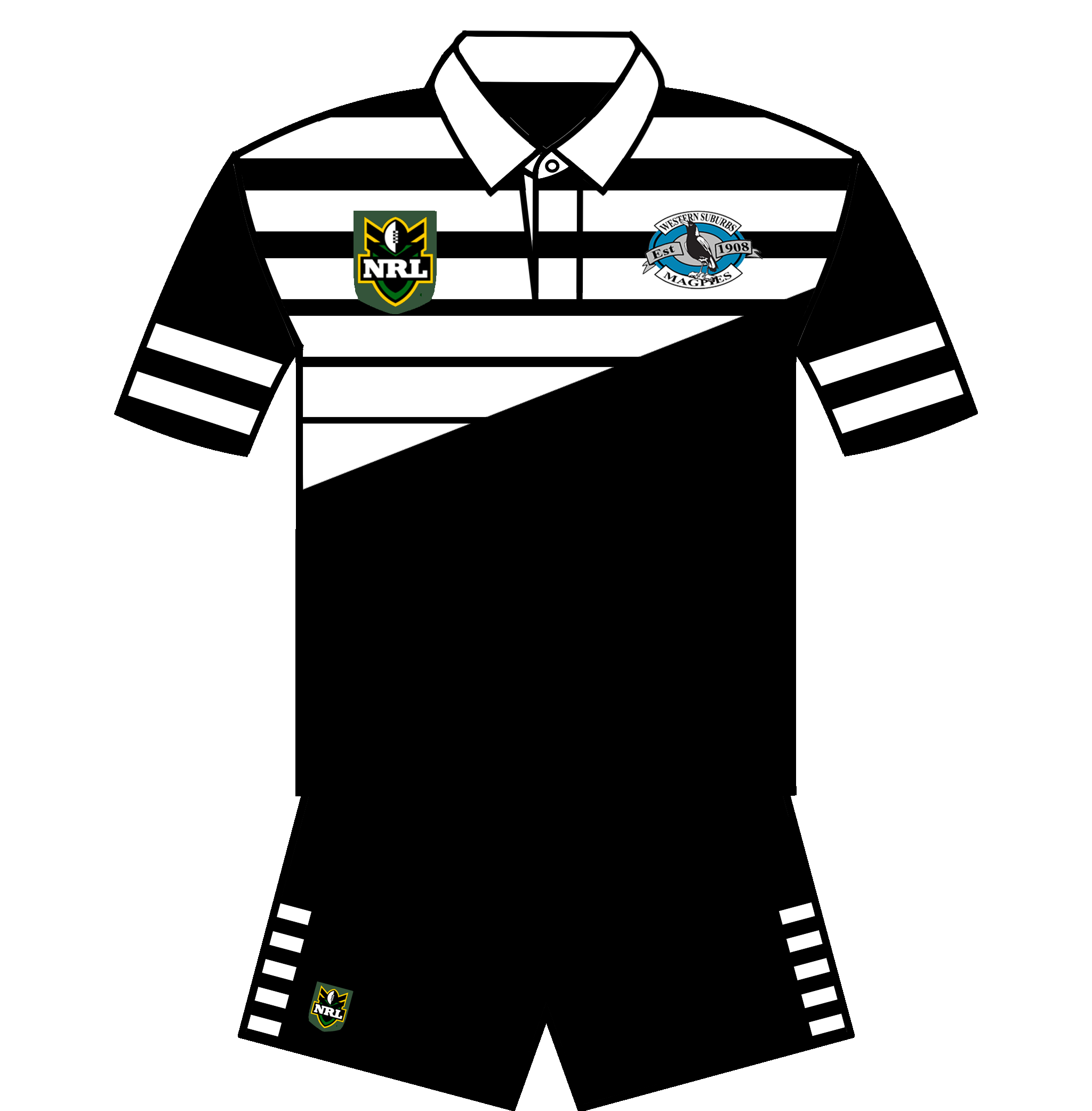
West. Suburbs Magpies 91st season Ground: Campbelltown Stadium; Coach: Tommy Raudonikis; Captain: Paul Langmack

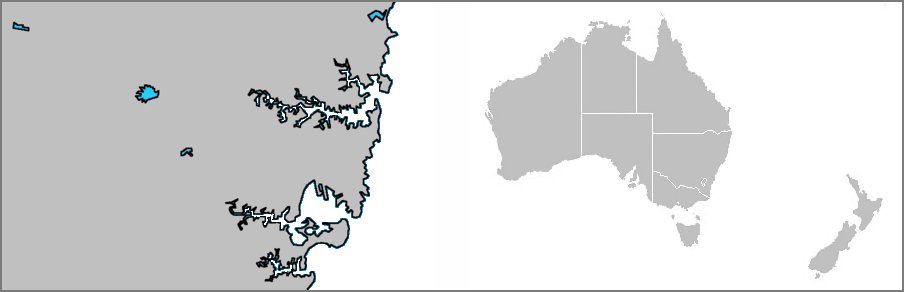
Locations of the participating clubs

== Regular season ==
Rounds 5 and 7: Brisbane Broncos set a new record for their biggest win, firstly 58–4 against North Queensland Cowboys, then 60–6 against North Sydney Bears, both games being played at Queensland Sport and Athletics Centre.
Round 8: 1997 ARL premiers, the Newcastle Knights played the 1997 Super League premiers, the Brisbane Broncos and Brisbane won 26–6 in Newcastle before a crowd of 27,119, cementing their position at the top of the ladder.
Round 12: The record for the biggest comeback in premiership history was re-set by the North Queensland Cowboys who trailed 26–0 at half-time and came back to beat the Penrith Panthers 36–28.
Round 24: Ivan Cleary's tally of 284 points set a new individual record for most points scored in a season in Australian club rugby league history; it has since been beaten.

=== Ladder ===
1998 NRL season
Pos	Team	Pld	W	D	L	PF	PA	PD	Pts
1	Brisbane Broncos (P)	24	18	1	5	688	310	+378	37
2	Newcastle Knights	24	18	1	5	562	381	+181	37
3	Melbourne Storm	24	17	1	6	546	372	+174	35
4	Parramatta Eels	24	17	1	6	468	349	+119	35
5	North Sydney Bears	24	17	0	7	663	367	+296	34
6	Sydney City Roosters	24	16	0	8	680	383	+297	32
7	Canberra Raiders	24	15	0	9	564	429	+135	30
8	St. George Dragons	24	13	1	10	486	490	−4	27
9	Canterbury-Bankstown Bulldogs	24	13	0	11	489	411	+78	26
10	Manly Warringah Sea Eagles	24	13	0	11	503	473	+30	26
11	Cronulla-Sutherland Sharks	24	12	1	11	438	387	+51	25
12	Illawarra Steelers	24	11	1	12	476	539	−63	23
13	Balmain Tigers	24	9	1	14	381	463	−82	19
14	Penrith Panthers	24	8	2	14	525	580	−55	18
15	Auckland Warriors	24	9	0	15	417	518	−101	18
16	North Queensland Cowboys	24	9	0	15	361	556	−195	18
17	Adelaide Rams	24	7	0	17	393	615	−222	14
18	South Sydney Rabbitohs	24	5	0	19	339	560	−221	10
19	Gold Coast Chargers	24	4	0	20	289	654	−365	8
20	Western Suburbs Magpies	24	4	0	20	371	802	−431	8

(P) Premiers

=== Ladder progression ===
- Numbers highlighted in green indicate that the team finished the round inside the top 10.
- Numbers highlighted in blue indicates the team finished first on the ladder in that round.
- Numbers highlighted in red indicates the team finished in last place on the ladder in that round

	Team	1	2	3	4	5	6	7	8	9	10	11	12	13	14	15	16	17	18	19	20	21	22	23	24
1	Brisbane Broncos	2	4	6	8	10	10	12	14	14	14	16	16	16	18	20	22	24	26	28	29	31	33	35	37
2	Newcastle Knights	2	4	6	8	10	10	12	12	14	16	18	20	22	24	24	26	27	29	31	31	31	33	35	37
3	Melbourne Storm	2	4	6	8	8	10	12	14	14	16	17	19	21	23	25	25	25	27	27	29	31	33	33	35
4	Parramatta Eels	2	4	4	6	8	8	8	10	12	14	16	18	20	22	24	24	24	26	28	28	30	32	34	35
5	North Sydney Bears	0	2	4	4	6	8	8	10	12	12	14	14	16	18	18	20	22	22	24	26	28	30	32	34
6	Sydney City Roosters	2	2	2	4	6	8	10	12	14	16	16	16	18	20	20	22	24	24	26	26	26	28	30	32
7	Canberra Raiders	0	0	2	2	4	4	6	8	10	12	12	14	16	16	18	18	20	20	22	24	26	28	30	30
8	St George Dragons	2	2	2	4	6	8	10	12	14	16	18	20	20	22	22	22	22	24	24	26	26	26	26	27
9	Canterbury Bulldogs	2	2	2	2	2	4	6	8	10	10	10	12	12	12	14	14	16	18	18	18	20	22	24	26
10	Manly Warringah Sea Eagles	0	2	2	2	2	4	6	6	6	6	8	8	8	8	10	12	14	14	16	18	20	22	24	26
11	Cronulla-Sutherland Sharks	0	2	2	2	4	4	6	8	10	10	12	14	14	14	16	18	18	18	19	21	23	23	23	25
12	Illawarra Steelers	0	2	2	2	2	4	6	6	8	8	9	11	13	13	15	17	19	19	19	19	21	21	23	23
13	Balmain Tigers	2	2	4	6	8	10	10	10	10	10	12	12	12	14	16	16	16	18	18	19	19	19	19	19
14	Penrith Panthers	0	2	2	4	4	4	4	6	6	8	8	8	8	8	8	8	9	11	12	14	14	14	16	18
15	Auckland Warriors	0	0	2	2	4	4	4	4	4	6	8	8	10	10	12	14	14	14	16	16	18	18	18	18
16	North Queensland Cowboys	2	4	6	8	8	10	10	10	10	10	10	12	14	14	14	14	16	16	18	18	18	18	18	18
17	Adelaide Rams	0	0	2	2	2	2	2	2	2	2	4	4	6	6	6	8	10	12	12	14	14	14	14	14
18	South Sydney Rabbitohs	2	2	2	2	2	4	4	4	4	4	4	4	4	4	4	6	6	6	6	8	8	10	10	10
19	Gold Coast Chargers	0	0	0	0	2	2	2	2	4	4	4	4	4	6	6	6	6	8	8	8	8	8	8	8
20	Western Suburbs Magpies	0	0	2	2	2	2	2	2	2	4	4	6	6	8	8	8	8	8	8	8	8	8	8	8

== Finals series ==
The biggest surprise of the season was when the Melbourne Storm finished 3rd after the regular season in their first ever year, only to be knocked out by the Brisbane Broncos in the Semi-final. The Canterbury-Bankstown Bulldogs became the lowest placed team ever to make the Grand Final, after finishing 9th after the regular season. Canterbury-Bankstown did it tough though, coming from 16 points down twice in as many weeks. They came from 16–0 down to win 28–16 against the Newcastle Knights in the Semi-final, then 18–2 down with 11 minutes to go to make it 18–18 after regulation time, then going on to win 32–20 in extra time against arch-rivals the Parramatta Eels in the preliminary final.

Home	Score	Away	Match Information
Home	Score	Away	Date and Time	Venue	Referee	Crowd
Elimination and Preliminary Qualifying Finals
Canberra Raiders	17–4	Manly-Warringah Sea Eagles	28 August 1998	Bruce Stadium	Bill Harrigan	15,953
St. George Dragons	12–20	Canterbury-Bankstown Bulldogs	29 August 1998	Jubilee Oval	Steve Clark	16,833
Parramatta Eels	25–12	North Sydney Bears	29 August 1998	Parramatta Stadium	Kelvin Jeffes	16,033
Melbourne Storm	12–26	Sydney City Roosters	30 August 1998	Olympic Park	Paul McBlane	18,247
Elimination and Qualifying Quarter-Finals
North Sydney Bears	2–23	Canterbury-Bankstown Bulldogs	4 September 1998	North Sydney Oval	Bill Harrigan	18,718
Melbourne Storm	24–10	Canberra Raiders	5 September 1998	Olympic Park	Steve Clark	12,592
Newcastle Knights	15–26	Sydney City Roosters	5 September 1998	Marathon Stadium	Kelvin Jeffes	26,482
Brisbane Broncos	10–15	Parramatta Eels	6 September 1998	ANZ Stadium	Paul McBlane	21,172
Semi-Finals
Newcastle Knights	16–28	Canterbury-Bankstown Bulldogs	12 September 1998	Sydney Football Stadium*	Steve Clark	24,449
Brisbane Broncos	30–6	Melbourne Storm	13 September 1998	Sydney Football Stadium*	Bill Harrigan	20,354
Grand Final Qualifiers
Sydney City Roosters	18–46	Brisbane Broncos	19 September 1998	ANZ Stadium	Steve Clark	28,374
Parramatta Eels	20–32	Canterbury-Bankstown Bulldogs	20 September 1998	Sydney Football Stadium	Bill Harrigan	36,841

- Note: Due to an agreement held between the NRL and SFS that required a set number of finals games to be held at the SFS, the semi-finals were both held at the SFS to meet the agreement despite neither "home" side being from Sydney.

=== Grand Final ===
The 1998 NRL Grand Final was the conclusive and premiership-deciding game of the 1998 NRL season. It was the first grand final of the re-unified National Rugby League and featured minor premiers and the previous year's Super League premiers, the Brisbane Broncos against the Canterbury-Bankstown Bulldogs, who had finished the regular season 9th (out of 20) to make a top-ten play-off grouping.

It was to be the first grand final under the National Rugby League partnership's administration and the last to be played at the Sydney Football Stadium. It was also the first time these two sides had met in a grand final. Brisbane scored first, but by half time trailed Canterbury 10–12. However, Brisbane scored 28 unanswered points in the second half, winning 12–38 and equaling the second highest score for a team in grand final history.

1998 NRL Grand Final

Sunday, 27 September
15:00 AEST (UTC+10)

Canterbury-Bankstown Bulldogs	12 – 38	Brisbane Broncos
Tries: 2 Grimaldi 21'; Talau 30'; Goals: 2 Halligan pen 11', 22' (2/3)	1st: 12–10; 2nd: 0–28; Report	Tries: 7 De Vere 2'; Campion 27'; Carroll 41'; Sailor 50'; Tallis 59'; Lee 68'; Smith 75'; Goals: 5 Lockyer 4', 43', 60', 69', 76' (5/7)

Sydney Football Stadium, Sydney
Attendance: 40,857
Referee: Bill Harrigan
Touch judges: Steve Betts, John McCormack
Clive Churchill Medal: Gorden Tallis (Brisbane)

=== Chart ===
Preliminary Semi Finals
30 Aug, Olympic Park
3	Melbourne	12
6	Sydney City	26
28 Aug, Bruce Stadium
7	Canberra	17
10	Manly-Warringah	4
29 Aug, Jubilee Oval
8	St. George	12
9	Canterbury	20
29 Aug, Parramatta Stadium
4	Parramatta	25
5	North Sydney	12

Qualifying and Elimination Finals
5 Sept, Marathon Stadium
2	Newcastle	15
Sydney City	26
5 Sept, Olympic Park
Melbourne	24
Canberra	10
4 Sept, North Sydney Oval
North Sydney	2
Canterbury	23
6 Sept, ANZ Stadium
1	Brisbane	10
Parramatta	15

Semi Finals
12 Sept, Sydney Football Stadium
Newcastle	16
Canterbury	28
13 Sept, Sydney Football Stadium
Brisbane	30
Melbourne	6

Preliminary Finals
19 Sept, ANZ Stadium
Sydney City	18
Brisbane	46
20 Sept, Sydney Football Stadium
Parramatta	20
Canterbury	32

Grand Final
27 Sept, Sydney Football Stadium
Brisbane	38
Canterbury	12

== Player statistics ==
The following statistics are as of the conclusion of Round 24.

Top 5 point scorers

Points	Player	Tries	Goals	Field Goals
268	Ivan Cleary	13	108	0
229	Jason Taylor	5	104	1
226	Darren Lockyer	14	85	0
208	Daryl Halligan	5	94	0
174	Andrew Johns	7	71	4

Top 5 try scorers

Tries	Player
20	Darren Smith
20	Michael Buettner
20	Steve Menzies
19	Nathan Blacklock
18	Trent Barrett

Top 5 goal scorers

Goals	Player
108	Ivan Cleary
104	Jason Taylor
94	Daryl Halligan
85	Darren Lockyer
72	Clinton Schifcofske

== Postseason ==
Brisbane's consistent dominance over other teams at this period of time contributed to the National Rugby League's plans to cut the number of teams down to 14 in order to ensure competitiveness and the long-term financial success of the game. Despite the rationalization of the league, the Broncos have continued to dominate in the modern era of the league, winning premierships in 2000, 2006 and 2025, as well as reaching another two Grand Finals in 2015 and 2023.

Despite the inclusion of "national" in the new competition's name, both the Gold Coast and Adelaide clubs folded at the end of the 1998 season. A new Gold Coast side re-entered the competition nine years later in 2007.

1998 was the last season for the seventy-eight-year-old St. George Dragons and seventeen-year-old Illawarra Steelers clubs, which merged to form the NRL's first joint-venture team at the conclusion of the season, the St. George Illawarra Dragons, for inclusion in the 1999 Premiership.

== 1998 Transfers ==
=== Players ===
Player	1997 Club	1998 Club
Tim Brasher	Balmain Tigers	South Sydney Rabbitohs
Ellery Hanley	Balmain Tigers	Retirement
Glenn Morrison	Balmain Tigers	North Sydney Bears
Marcus Bai	Gold Coast Chargers	Melbourne Storm
Martin Bella	Gold Coast Chargers	Retirement
Des Clark	Gold Coast Chargers	Super League: Halifax Blue Sox
Brendan Hurst	Gold Coast Chargers	Sydney City Roosters
Jeremy Schloss	Gold Coast Chargers	South Sydney Rabbitohs
John Cross	Illawarra Steelers	Penrith Panthers
Brett Rodwell	Illawarra Steelers	South Sydney Rabbitohs
Mark Carroll	Manly Warringah Sea Eagles	Super League: London Broncos
David Gillespie	Manly Warringah Sea Eagles	Retirement
Shannon Nevin	Manly Warringah Sea Eagles	Balmain Tigers
Scott Conley	Newcastle Knights	Gold Coast Chargers
Leo Dynevor	Newcastle Knights	Western Suburbs Magpies
Marc Glanville	Newcastle Knights	Super League: Leeds Rhinos
Adam Muir	Newcastle Knights	North Sydney Bears
Chris Caruana	North Sydney Bears	South Sydney Rabbitohs
Darren Fritz	North Sydney Bears	Western Suburbs Magpies
David Hall	North Sydney Bears	South Sydney Rabbitohs
Danny Williams	North Sydney Bears	Melbourne Storm
Troy Campbell	Parramatta Eels	Gold Coast Chargers
Chris Lawler	Parramatta Eels	Gold Coast Chargers
David Woods	Parramatta Eels	Penrith Panthers
Russell Wyer	Parramatta Eels	Retirement
Michael Eagar	South Queensland Crushers	Super League: Warrington Wolves
Jason Hudson	South Queensland Crushers	Gold Coast Chargers
John Jones	South Queensland Crushers	Retirement
Clinton O'Brien	South Queensland Crushers	Gold Coast Chargers
Mark Protheroe	South Queensland Crushers	Retirement
Steele Retchless	South Queensland Crushers	Super League: London Broncos
Clinton Schifcofske	South Queensland Crushers	Parramatta Eels
Craig Teevan	South Queensland Crushers	Gold Coast Chargers
Mat Toshack	South Queensland Crushers	Super League: London Broncos
Dave Watson	South Queensland Crushers	Super League: Sheffield Eagles
Craig Wilson	South Queensland Crushers	Illawarra Steelers
Jeff Orford	South Sydney Rabbitohs	Retirement
David Penna	South Sydney Rabbitohs	Parramatta Eels
Craig Simon	South Sydney Rabbitohs	Illawarra Steelers
Mark Bell	St. George Dragons	Super League: Wigan Warriors
Peter Clarke	Sydney City Roosters	Adelaide Rams
Ben Duckworth	Sydney City Roosters	Balmain Tigers
Sean Garlick	Sydney City Roosters	South Sydney Rabbitohs
Terry Hermansson	Sydney City Roosters	South Sydney Rabbitohs
Brandon Pearson	Sydney City Roosters	Canberra Raiders
Dale Shearer	Sydney City Roosters	North Queensland Cowboys
Jacin Sinclair	Sydney City Roosters	Balmain Tigers
Bill Dunn	Western Suburbs Magpies	Retirement
Des Hasler	Western Suburbs Magpies	Retirement
James Smith	Western Suburbs Magpies	South Sydney Rabbitohs
Cameron Blair	Adelaide Rams (Super League)	Retirement
Kevin Campion	Adelaide Rams (Super League)	Brisbane Broncos
Phil Blake	Auckland Warriors (Super League)	Retirement
Mark Horo	Auckland Warriors (Super League)	Retirement
Grant Young	Auckland Warriors (Super League)	Super League: London Broncos
Glenn Lazarus	Brisbane Broncos (Super League)	Melbourne Storm
Anthony Mundine	Brisbane Broncos (Super League)	St. George Dragons
Noa Nadruku	Canberra Raiders (Super League)	North Queensland Cowboys
Quentin Pongia	Canberra Raiders (Super League)	Auckland Warriors
Richie Barnett	Cronulla-Sutherland Sharks (Super League)	Sydney City Roosters
Tawera Nikau	Cronulla-Sutherland Sharks (Super League)	Melbourne Storm
Keith Beauchamp	Hunter Mariners (Super League)	Retirement
Anthony Brann	Hunter Mariners (Super League)	Canberra Raiders
John Carlaw	Hunter Mariners (Super League)	Melbourne Storm
Darrien Doherty	Hunter Mariners (Super League)	Adelaide Rams
Justin Dooley	Hunter Mariners (Super League)	Sydney City Roosters
Brad Godden	Hunter Mariners (Super League)	Super League: Leeds Rhinos
Noel Goldthorpe	Hunter Mariners (Super League)	Adelaide Rams
Scott Hill	Hunter Mariners (Super League)	Melbourne Storm
Kevin Iro	Hunter Mariners (Super League)	Auckland Warriors
Tony Iro	Hunter Mariners (Super League)	Adelaide Rams
Brett Kimmorley	Hunter Mariners (Super League)	Melbourne Storm
Tim Maddison	Hunter Mariners (Super League)	Cronulla-Sutherland Sharks
Paul Marquet	Hunter Mariners (Super League)	Melbourne Storm
Robbie McCormack	Hunter Mariners (Super League)	Super League: Wigan Warriors
Neil Piccinelli	Hunter Mariners (Super League)	Newcastle Knights
Willie Poching	Hunter Mariners (Super League)	St. George Dragons
Robbie Ross	Hunter Mariners (Super League)	Melbourne Storm
Troy Stone	Hunter Mariners (Super League)	Canterbury-Bankstown Bulldogs
Richard Swain	Hunter Mariners (Super League)	Melbourne Storm
Nick Zisti	Hunter Mariners (Super League)	Cronulla-Sutherland Sharks
Justin Loomans	North Queensland Cowboys (Super League)	South Sydney Rabbitohs
David Alexander	Penrith Panthers (Super League)	Retirement
Steve Waddell	Penrith Panthers (Super League)	Retirement
Paul Bell	Perth Reds (Super League)	Melbourne Storm
Damien Chapman	Perth Reds (Super League)	Super League: London Broncos
Shaun Devine	Perth Reds (Super League)	Retirement
Jeff Doyle	Perth Reds (Super League)	Retirement
Greg Fleming	Perth Reds (Super League)	Canterbury-Bankstown Bulldogs
Dale Fritz	Perth Reds (Super League)	North Queensland Cowboys
Matt Fuller	Perth Reds (Super League)	Wakefield Trinity
Mark Geyer	Perth Reds (Super League)	Penrith Panthers
Darren Higgins	Perth Reds (Super League)	Super League: London Broncos
Tim Horan	Perth Reds (Super League)	Illawarra Steelers
Rodney Howe	Perth Reds (Super League)	Melbourne Storm
Robbie Kearns	Perth Reds (Super League)	Melbourne Storm
Barrie-Jon Mather	Perth Reds (Super League)	Super League: Castleford Tigers
Matthew Rodwell	Perth Reds (Super League)	St. George Dragons
Chris Ryan	Perth Reds (Super League)	Super League: London Broncos
Peter Shiels	Perth Reds (Super League)	Newcastle Knights
Russell Bawden	Super League: London Broncos	Melbourne Storm
Tony Martin	Super League: London Broncos	Melbourne Storm
Matt Munro	Super League: Oldham Bears	South Sydney Rabbitohs
Danny McAllister	Super League: Sheffield Eagles	Gold Coast Chargers
Tony Tatupu	Super League: Warrington Wolves	Auckland Warriors

=== Coaches ===
Coach	1997 Club	1998 Club
Chris Anderson	Canterbury-Bankstown Bulldogs (Super League)	Melbourne Storm
Graham Murray	Hunter Mariners (Super League)	Super League: Leeds Rhinos
