= 1998 Parramatta Eels season =

- NRL Rank: 4th
- Play-off result: Preliminary Finalists (Lost 20–32 vs Canterbury-Bankstown Bulldogs, 2nd Preliminary Final)
- 1998 record: Wins: 17; draws: 1; losses: 6
- Points scored: For: 468; against: 349

Team information
- CEO: Denis Fitzgerald
- Coach: (Australia) Brian Smith
- Captain: (New Zealand) Jarrod McCracken (Australia) Dean Pay
- Stadium: Parramatta Stadium (Capacity: 20,741)

Top scorers
- Tries: (Australia) Stuart Kelly (15)
- Goals: (Australia) Clinton Schifcofske (78)
- Points: (Australia) Clinton Schifcofske (176)
← 1997	List of seasons	1999 →

The 1998 Parramatta Eels season was the 52nd in the club's history. Coached by Brian Smith and captained by Dean Pay they competed in the National Rugby League's 1998 Premiership season.

== Summary ==
Parramatta finished fourth in the newly created 20-team NRL. Parramatta had a highly successful finals series, beating the North Sydney Bears in a Qualifying Final and then backing up to defeat eventual premiers the Brisbane Broncos 15–10 at ANZ Stadium in Brisbane. Due to the win, Parramatta gained a week off before clashing with arch-rivals Canterbury in the Grand Final Qualifier.

The game was poised at 18–2 in favour of Parramatta with 11 minutes to go. However, Canterbury managed a late resurgence scoring three tries in eight minutes to tie the game up at 18–18 with Daryl Halligan kicking two side line conversions which took the game into extra-time. The extra-time period is remembered for the performance of Parramatta player Paul Carige who made three crucial errors. Parramatta would go on to lose 32-20 in extra-time.

== Standings ==
1998 NRL season
Pos	Team	Pld	W	D	L	PF	PA	PD	Pts
1	Brisbane Broncos (P)	24	18	1	5	688	310	+378	37
2	Newcastle Knights	24	18	1	5	562	381	+181	37
3	Melbourne Storm	24	17	1	6	546	372	+174	35
4	Parramatta Eels	24	17	1	6	468	349	+119	35
5	North Sydney Bears	24	17	0	7	663	367	+296	34
6	Sydney City Roosters	24	16	0	8	680	383	+297	32
7	Canberra Raiders	24	15	0	9	564	429	+135	30
8	St. George Dragons	24	13	1	10	486	490	−4	27
9	Canterbury-Bankstown Bulldogs	24	13	0	11	489	411	+78	26
10	Manly Warringah Sea Eagles	24	13	0	11	503	473	+30	26
11	Cronulla-Sutherland Sharks	24	12	1	11	438	387	+51	25
12	Illawarra Steelers	24	11	1	12	476	539	−63	23
13	Balmain Tigers	24	9	1	14	381	463	−82	19
14	Penrith Panthers	24	8	2	14	525	580	−55	18
15	Auckland Warriors	24	9	0	15	417	518	−101	18
16	North Queensland Cowboys	24	9	0	15	361	556	−195	18
17	Adelaide Rams	24	7	0	17	393	615	−222	14
18	South Sydney Rabbitohs	24	5	0	19	339	560	−221	10
19	Gold Coast Chargers	24	4	0	20	289	654	−365	8
20	Western Suburbs Magpies	24	4	0	20	371	802	−431	8

(P) Premiers

== Awards ==
- Club man of the year: Stuart Kelly
- Players' player: Jason Smith
- Coach's award: Nathan Cayless
- Rookie of the year: Nathan Hindmarsh
