= Corey Waddell =

Australian rugby league footballer (born 1996)

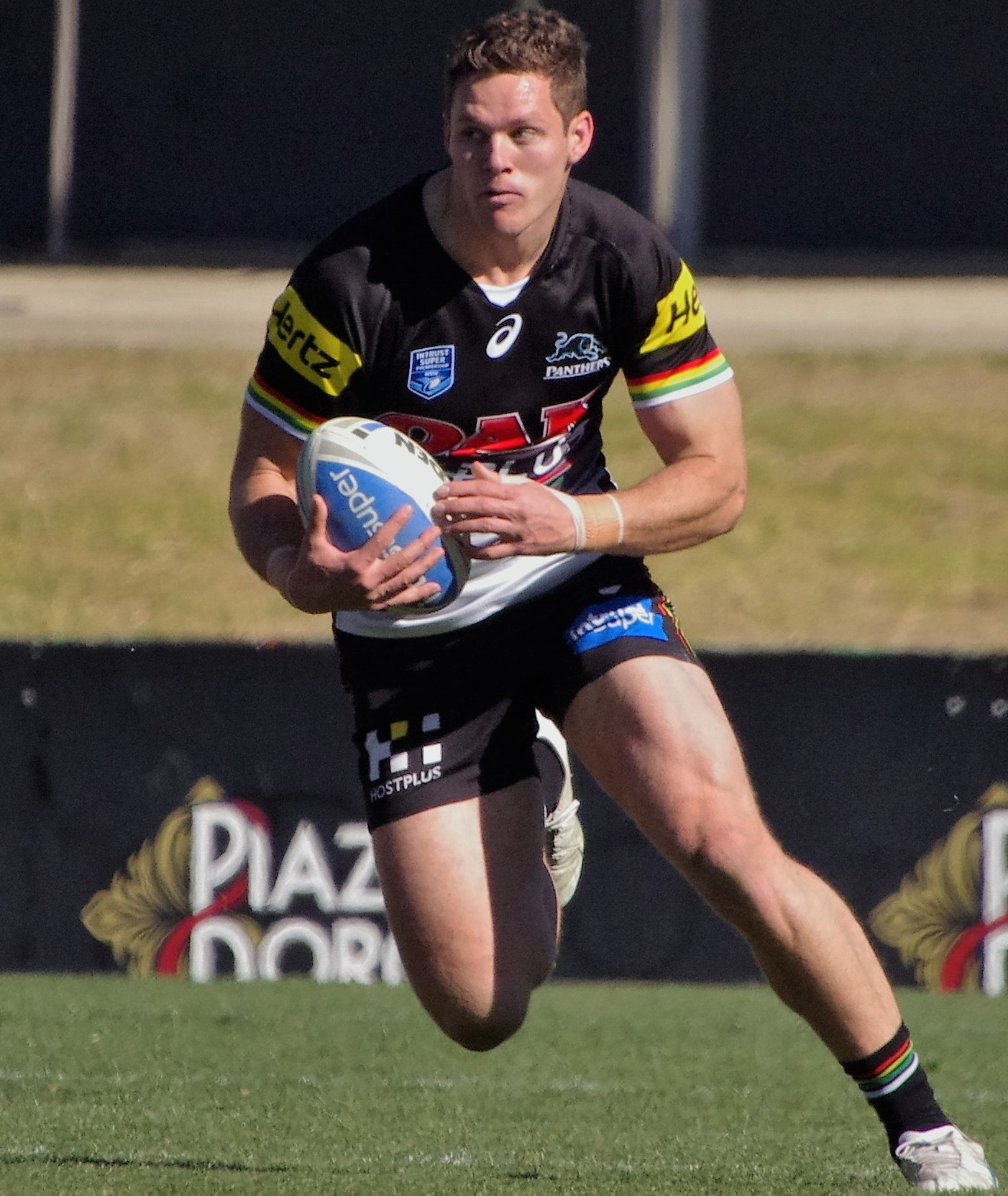

Personal information
- Born: 2 October 1996 (age 30) Sydney, New South Wales, Australia
- Height: 190 cm (6 ft 3 in)
- Weight: 102 kg (16 st 1 lb)

Playing information
- Position: Second-row, Lock
Club
Years	Team	Pld	T	G	FG	P
2019–20	Manly Sea Eagles	36	2	0	0	8
2021–23	Canterbury Bulldogs	59	5	0	0	20
2024–	Manly Sea Eagles	51	8	0	0	32
	Total	146	15	0	0	60
- Source: As of 5 September 2026
- Father: Steve Waddell

Corey Waddell (born 2 October 1996) is an Australian professional rugby league footballer who plays as a second-row forward for the Manly Warringah Sea Eagles in the National Rugby League.

He previously played for the Canterbury-Bankstown Bulldogs in the NRL. He also uses social media as a platform to show off his culinary skills and encourage fans to live a healthy life.

== Background ==
Waddell was born in Sydney, New South Wales, Australia. He is the son of former Penrith Panthers and Illawarra Steelers player Steve Waddell.

Waddell played his junior rugby league for Emu Plains JRLFC, before signing with Penrith Panthers.

== Playing career ==
=== 2019 ===
In round 2 of the 2019 NRL season, Waddell made his NRL debut for Manly-Warringah against the Sydney Roosters. In the 2019 Semi-Final against South Sydney, Waddell scored his first NRL try in a 34–26 loss at ANZ Stadium.

=== 2020 ===
Waddell played 13 games for Manly in the 2020 NRL season as the club missed the finals. He then signed a deal to join Canterbury-Bankstown for the 2021 season.

=== 2021 ===
Waddell made a total of 20 appearances for Canterbury in the 2021 NRL season as the club finished last and claimed the Wooden Spoon.

=== 2022 ===
On 26 July, Waddell was suspended for five games after being found guilty of eye gouging an opponent during Canterbury's round 19 victory over the Gold Coast. Waddell played a total of 17 matches for Canterbury in the 2022 NRL season as the club finished 12th on the table.

=== 2023 ===
Waddell played a total of 22 games for Canterbury in the 2023 NRL season as the club finished 15th on the table. On 24 October, Waddell signed a one-year deal with his former club Manly ahead of the 2024 season.

=== 2024 ===
He played 17 matches for Manly in the 2024 NRL season as they finished 7th on the table and qualified for the finals. Manly would be eliminated in the second week of the finals by the Sydney Roosters. On 14 December 2024, Waddell re-signed with the club until the end of 2027.

=== 2025 ===
Waddell played 22 matches for Manly in the 2025 NRL season as the club finished 10th on the table.

=== 2026 ===
Waddell played 12 matches for Manly in the 2026 NRL season as the club finished 9th on the table.

== Statistics ==
Year	Team	Games	Tries	Pts
2019	Manly Warringah Sea Eagles	23	1	4
2020	Manly Warringah Sea Eagles	13	1	4
2021	Canterbury-Bankstown Bulldogs	20	1	4
2022	Canterbury-Bankstown Bulldogs	17		
2023	Canterbury-Bankstown Bulldogs	22	4	16
2024	Manly Warringah Sea Eagles	17	3	12
2025	Manly Warringah Sea Eagles	22	4	16
2026	Manly Warringah Sea Eagles	12	1	4
	Totals	146	15	60
