= Steve Waddell =

Australian rugby league footballer

Personal information
- Full name: Steve Waddell
- Born: 5 October 1966 Lithgow, New South Wales, Australia
- Died: 9 April 2012 (aged 45) Sydney, New South Wales, Australia

Playing information
- Position: Prop
Club
Years	Team	Pld	T	G	FG	P
1988–91	Penrith Panthers	17	0	0	0	0
1992–94	Illawarra Steelers	40	0	0	0	0
1995–97	Penrith Panthers	32	0	0	0	0
	Total	89	0	0	0	0
- Source: As of 31 January 2023
- Relatives: Corey Waddell (son)

Steve Waddell (1966−2012) was an Australian professional rugby league footballer who played in the 1980s and 1990s. He played for the Penrith Panthers and Illawarra Steelers in the NSWRL/ARL/Super League (Australia) competitions.

== Background ==
Waddell is the father of current NRL player Corey Waddell.

== Playing career ==
Waddell was a Lithgow junior who was signed by Penrith in 1987. He made his first grade debut for the Penrith in round 14 of the 1988 NSWRL season, coming off the interchange bench against St. George at Belmore Sports Ground. He would make 17 appearances over the next four seasons before leaving Penrith at the end of 1991 and signing with the Illawarra Steelers.

In Waddell's first season at Illawarra, the club reached the finals for the first time in their history. Waddell played in all three matches including the preliminary final where they lost to St. George. For his efforts, Waddell was named Illawarra's player of the year. After a further two years at Illawarra, Waddell returned to Penrith.

He would be a more regular contributor to the Penrith forward pack in his second stint, making 16 appearances in 1995 and a further 13 in 1996, most of them in the front row. However, he would be restricted to just three appearances in 1997 and would leave the club at season’s end.
