= David Alexander (rugby league) =

Australian rugby league footballer

Dave Alexander
Personal information
- Full name: David Alexander
- Born: 10 January 1968 (age 57)

Playing information
- Position: Prop
Club
Years	Team	Pld	T	G	FG	P
1989–1992	North Sydney	48	2	0	0	8
1993–1994	Manly-Warringah	30	2	0	0	8
1995–1997	Penrith	34	1	0	0	4
	Total	112	5	0	0	20
- Source: As of 8 May 2020

David Alexander (born 10 January 1968) is a former professional rugby league player who played for the North Sydney Bears, the Manly-Warringah Sea Eagles, and the Penrith Panthers.

== Career ==
Alexander debuted for North Sydney during the 1989 season. He moved to Manly-Warringah in 1993 and again to Penrith in 1995. He was one of 5 Penrith players whom the ARL agreed to release from their contracts on 29 November 1996 so they could play in the Super League.
