= Russell Wyer =

Australian rugby league footballer

Personal information
- Born: 17 May 1972 (age 54) Sydney, New South Wales, Australia

Playing information
- Position: Centre, Fullback, Wing
Club
Years	Team	Pld	T	G	FG	P
1990–93	Western Suburbs	28	9	0	0	36
1994	Newcastle Knights	19	11	0	0	44
1995–97	Parramatta Eels	25	8	1	0	34
	Total	72	28	1	0	114
- Source: As of 18 January 2019

Russell Wyer (born 17 May 1972) is an Australian former professional rugby league footballer who played in the 1990s for the Western Suburbs Magpies, Newcastle Knights and the Parramatta Eels in the National Rugby League competition.

== Playing career ==
Wyer made his first grade debut for Western Suburbs in 1990 at the age of 18 scoring 2 tries in his first game against Penrith.

After 4 years at Wests, Wyer joined Newcastle in 1994 and finished top try scorer at the club. In 1995, Wyer joined Parramatta and in 1997 played in both finals matches for the club, this was the first time since 1986 that Parramatta had qualified for the finals.

Wyer's final match in first grade was the 1997 elimination final loss against North Sydney.

== Sources ==
- Whiticker, Alan & Hudson, Glen (2006) The Encyclopedia of Rugby League Players, Gavin Allen Publishing, Sydney
