= Michael Eagar =

Ireland international rugby league footballer

Personal information
- Full name: Michael Eagar
- Born: 15 August 1973 (age 51); Newcastle, New South Wales, Australia

Playing information
- Height: 185 cm (6 ft 1 in)
- Weight: 93 kg (14 st 9 lb)
- Position: Fullback, Centre, Five-eighth
Club
Years	Team	Pld	T	G	FG	P
1994–95	Newcastle Knights	11	2	0	0	8
1997	South Queensland Crushers	20	5	0	0	20
1998	Warrington Wolves	21	6	0	0	24
1999–03	Castleford Tigers	132	60	0	0	240
2004–05	Hull FC	12	4	0	0	16
	Total	196	77	0	0	308
Representative
Years	Team	Pld	T	G	FG	P
2000	Ireland	3	1	0	0	4

Michael Eagar (born 15 August 1973) is a former Ireland international rugby league footballer who played in the 1990s and 2000s.

== Background ==
Eagar was born in Newcastle, New South Wales, Australia.

== Career ==
He played for the Newcastle Knights and the South Queensland Crushers in Australia and the Warrington Wolves, the Castleford Tigers and Hull F.C. in the Super League. His position of choice was a centre and he also played as a fullback and as a stand-off. Eagar was a popular player whilst playing for Castleford Tigers.

Eagar was an Ireland international and played at the 2000 Rugby League World Cup.
