= 1998 Canterbury Bulldogs season =

← 1997	1999 →

The 1998 Canterbury Bulldogs season was the 64th in the club's history. Coached by Steve Folkes and captained by Simon Gillies then Darren Britt, they competed in the 1998 NRL season's, finishing the regular season 9th (out of 20) to make a top-ten play-off grouping before reaching the grand final which they lost to the Brisbane Broncos.

== Match results ==
1998 Season Results
Round	Opponent	Result	Bulldogs	Opposition	Date	Venue	Crowd
1	Canberra Raiders	Win	20	10	15 March	Belmore Sports Ground	8,453
2	Brisbane Broncos	Loss	12	20	22 March	Belmore Sports Ground	10,962
3	Adelaide Rams	Loss	20	22	27 March	Adelaide Oval	8,390
4	Balmain Tigers	Loss	10	24	5 April	Belmore Sports Ground	10,152
5	Parramatta Eels	Loss	14	22	11 April	Parramatta Stadium	14,012
6	Gold Coast Chargers	Win	56	10	19 April	Belmore Sports Ground	5,179
7	Balmain Tigers	Win	26	10	25 April	Leichhardt Oval	18,485
8	Adelaide Rams	Win	38	4	3 May	Belmore Sports Ground	5,041
9	North Queensland Cowboys	Win	24	18	9 May	Dairy Farmers Stadium	15,288
10	Auckland Warriors	Loss	6	20	16 May	Belmore Sports Ground	5,224
11	Brisbane Broncos	Loss	12	40	24 May	ANZ Stadium QLD	15,407
12	Manly-Warringah Sea Eagles	Win	28	2	31 May	Belmore Sports Ground	10,152
13	North Sydney Bears	Loss	4	38	7 June	Belmore Sports Ground	9,427
14	Newcastle Knights	Loss	4	12	14 March	EnergyAustralia Stadium	21,717
15	Sydney City Roosters	Win	22	10	21 June	Belmore Sports Ground	8,926
16	Cronulla-Sutherland Sharks	Loss	6	28	27 June	Toyota Park	10,243
17	South Sydney Rabbitohs	Won	30	8	4 July	Sydney Football Stadium	5,822
18	Canberra Raiders	Win	22	20	12 July	Canberra Stadium	9,610
19	Parramatta Eels	Loss	6	7	18 July	Belmore Sports Ground	9,541
20	Penrith Panthers	Loss	18	26	26 May	Penrith Stadium	6,404
21	Western Suburbs Magpies	Win	56	14	2 August	Belmore Sports Ground	6,125
22	St. George Dragons	Win	28	16	9 August	OKI Jubilee Stadium	10,739
23	Melbourne Storm	Win	8	4	15 August	Belmore Sports Ground	11,179
24	Illawarra Steelers	Win	25	24	23 August	WIN Stadium	13,106
Minor Semi Final	St. George Dragons	Win	20	12	29 August	OKI Jubilee Stadium	16,833
Semi Final	North Sydney Bears	Win	23	2	2 September	North Sydney Oval	18,718
1st Preliminary Final	Newcastle Knights	Win	28	16	12 September	Sydney Football Stadium	24,449
1st Grand Final Qualifier	Parramatta Eels	Win	32	20	20 September	Sydney Football Stadium	36,841
GRAND FINAL	Brisbane Broncos	Loss	12	38	27 September	Sydney Football Stadium	40,857

== Grand final ==
The 1998 NRL grand final was the conclusive and premiership-deciding game of the 1998 NRL season. It was the first grand final of the re-unified National Rugby League and featured minor premiers and the previous year's Super League premiers, the Brisbane Broncos against the Canterbury-Bankstown Bulldogs. It was to be the first grand final under the National Rugby League partnership's administration and the last to be played at the Sydney Football Stadium. It was also the first time these two sides had met in a grand final.

Brisbane scored first but by half time trailed the Canterbury side 10–12. However, the Brisbane club scored 28 unanswered points in the second half, winning 12–38 and equaling the second highest score for a team in grand final history.

1998 NRL Grand Final

Sunday, 27 September
15:00 AEST (UTC+10)

Brisbane Broncos	38 – 12	Canterbury-Bankstown Bulldogs
Tries: 7 De Vere 2'; Campion 27'; Carroll 41'; Sailor 50'; Tallis 59'; Lee 68'; Smith 75'; Goals: 5 Lockyer 4', 43', 60', 69', 76' (5/7)	1st: 10–12; 2nd: 28–0; Report	Tries: 2 Grimaldi 21'; Talau 30'; Goals: 2 Halligan pen 11', 22' (2/3)

Sydney Football Stadium, Sydney
Attendance: 40,857
Referee: Bill Harrigan
Touch judges: Steve Betts, John McCormack
Clive Churchill Medal: Gorden Tallis (Brisbane)

== See also ==
- List of Canterbury-Bankstown Bulldogs seasons
